= Nimrod Theatre Company =

Theatre company in Sydney, Australia (1970–1988)

- Formation: 1970
- Dissolved: 1988
- Type: Theatre group
- Location: Sydney, Australia

Nimrod Theatre Company is an Australian theatre company.

The Nimrod Theatre Company, commonly known as The Nimrod, was an Australian theatre company based in Sydney. It was founded in 1970 by Australian actors John Bell, Richard Wherrett and Ken Horler, and gained a reputation for producing more "good new Australian drama" from 1970 to 1985 than any other Australian theatre company.

The company's original theatre located in Nimrod Street, Kings Cross is now home to Griffin Theatre Company. The company moved in 1974 to Belvoir Street, Surry Hills, but retained its original name. From 1981 to 1988 it also played in the Seymour Centre theatres. The company ceased operations in 1988.

Subsequently, the Surry Hills venue became known as the Belvoir Street Theatre.

== Alumni ==
Notable Nimrod alumni include: Geoffrey Rush, Judy Davis, Colin Friels, Hugo Weaving, Barry Otto, Mel Gibson, Donal Gibson, Jacki Weaver, Baz Luhrman, Bill Hunter, Max Cullen, Angela Punch McGregor, Robert Coleby, Wendy Hughes, Robyn Nevin, Noni Hazelhurst, Jon Blake, Ruth Cracknell, Bob Maza, Michael Caton, Bruce Spence, Max Gillies, Warren Mitchell, Simon Burke, John Hargreaves, Ivar Kants, Gillian Jones, Kris McQuade, Ray Meagher, Chris Haywood, Mark Lee, Tina Bursill, Tony Llewellyn-Jones, Max Phipps, John Wood, John Clayton, Peter Sumner, Peter Whitford, Cornelia Frances, Jean Kittson, Lynette Curran, Paul Chubb, Kate Fitzpatrick, Drew Forsythe, Nick Enright, Helen Morse, Diane Craig, Robert Grubb, Peter Carroll, Carole Skinner, Catherine Wilkin, Peg Christensen, Gary Day, James Elliott, Henri Szeps, Kerry Walker, Anna Volska, Robert Menzies, Sally McKenzie, Julie McGregor, Judi Farr, Nancye Hayes, Margo Lee, Robin Ramsay, Melissa Jaffer, Reg Gorman, Jon Ewing, Heather Mitchell, Harold Hopkins, Cathy Downes, Michele Fawdon, Ron Haddrick, Deidre Rubenstein.

== Productions ==
=== 1970 ===
Year	Title	Cast & crew
1970	Biggles	Writers: Michael Boddy, Marcus Cooney, Ron Blair; Director: John Bell; Cast: John Hargreaves, Anna Volska, Michael Boddy, Drew Forsythe, Peter Rowley, Jane Harders, Ken Horler, Mervyn Drake, Robert Ellis

=== 1971 ===
Year	Title	Cast & crew
1971	Act Without Words	Writer: Samuel Beckett; Cast: Andrew McLennan, Michael Rolfe
1971	Endgame	Writer: Samuel Beckett; Director: Ken Horler; Cast: Stephen Costain, Jane Harders, Andrew McLennan, Michael Rolfe
1971	Macbeth	Writer: Shakespeare; Director: John Bell; Cast: Gillian Jones, Arthur Dignam, Nico Lathouris, Robyn Nevin, Terry O'Brien, John Paramor, Margaret Cameron
1971	The Roy Murphy Show (double bill with Customs and Excise)	Writer: Alex Buzo; Director: Richard Wherrett; Cast: John Clayton, Jacki Weaver, John Wood, Martin Harris, Andrew McLennan, Marcus Cooney
1971	Customs and Excise (double bill with The Roy Murphy Show)	Writer: Jack Hibberd; Director: Ken Horler; Cast: John Clayton, Lynette Curran, Jacki Weaver, John Wood, Martin Harris, Andrew McLennan, Jenne Welsh
1971	Duke of Edinburgh Assassinated or The Vindication of Henry Parkes	Writers: Bob Ellis & Dick Hall; Director: Aarne Neame; Cast: Bob Hornery, Max Phipps, Carole Skinner, John Wood, Victor Marsh, Alan Tobin
1971	Shadow Puppets	Director: Larry Eastwood; Cast/Puppeteer: Richard Bradshaw
1971	After Magritte	Writer: Tom Stoppard; Director: Larry Eastwood; Cast: Max Phipps, Carole Skinner, Jacki Weaver, Martin Harris
1971	The Removalists	Writer: David Williamson; Director: John Bell; Cast: Don Crosby, Chris Haywood, Max Phipps, Carole Skinner, Jacki Weaver, Martin Harris
1971	Hamlet on Ice	Writers: Michael Boddy, Ron Blair, Marcus Cooney; Director: Aarne Neeme; Cast: Rory O'Donoghue, Grahame Bond, John Derum, Kate Fitzpatrick, Bob Hornery, Lex Marinos, John Wood
1971-72	Flash Jim Vaux: A Ballad Opera	Writer: Ron Blair; Director: John Bell; Cast: John Gaden, Jonathan Hardy, Bob Hornery, Sheila Kennelly, John Wood, Terence Clarke, Jane Harders

=== 1972 ===
Year	Title	Cast & crew
1972	Alfred the Incredible Sheepboy	Writer: David Williamson
1972	Measure for Measure	Writer: Shakespeare; Director: John Bell; Cast: Garry McDonald, Anna Volska, John Wood, Jane Harders, Kevin Jackson, Michael Long, Brendon Lunney, Edward Ogden
1972	Shadows of Blood	Writer: Helmut Bakaitis; Director: Rex Cramphorn; Cast: Kate Fitzpatrick, Bob Hornery, John Wood, Martin Magee, Jane Harders, Peter Andrew
1972	Rooted	Writer: Alex Buzo; Director: Ken Horler; Cast: Kate Fitzpatrick, Gerard Maguire, Helen Morse, Max Phipps, Katy Wild, David Lawton
1972	On Yer Marx: Bigotry V.C. (double bill with Housey)	Writer: John Wood; Director: Aarne Neame; Cast: Diane Craig, Max Cullen, Nick Enright, John Wood, Chris Haywood, Denny Lawrence, Lex Marinos, Carole Skinner, Terry Bader, Barry Lovett
1972	On Yer Marx: Housey (double bill with Bigotry V.C.)	Writer: John Wood; Director: Aarne Neame; Cast: Diane Craig, Max Cullen, Nick Enright, John Wood, Chris Haywood, Denny Lawrence, Lex Marinos, Carole Skinner, Terry Bader, Barry Lovett
1972	Arthur	Writer: David Cregan
1972	Dazzle	Writer: Michael Cove
1972	The Sweatproof Boy	Writer: Alma De Groen; Director: Richard Wherrett; Cast: John Morris, Rilla Scott, Joseph Hasham
1972	Basically Black	Writers: Bob Maza, Gary Foley, Ron Blair, Jim Crawford, Ken Horler, John Huston, Bill Reed; Director: Ken Horler; Cast: Gary Foley, Bob Maza, Bindi Williams, Aileen Louisa Corpus III, Zac Martin
1972	The Last Supper Show	Writer: Michael Boddy; Director: Aarne Neeme; Cast: Max Cullen, John Derum, Jonathan Hardy, Carole Skinner, John Wood, Terence Clarke

=== 1973 ===
Year	Title	Cast & crew
1973	Kaspar	Writer: Peter Handke; Director: Richard Wherrett; Cast: Chris Haywood, Lex Marinos, Philip Sayer, Andrew Sharp, Berys Marsh
1973	The Tooth of Crime	Writer: Sam Shepard; Director: John Bell; Cast: Reg Livermore, Chris Haywood, Michael Caton, Tony Llewellyn-Jones, Anna Volska
1973	Prison 73: The Chocolate Frog (double bill with The Old Familiar Juice)	Writer: Jim McNeil; Director: Ken Horler; Cast: Max Cullen, Kevin Leslie, Roger Newcombe
1973	Prison 73: The Old Familiar Juice (double bill with The Chocolate Frog)	Writer: Jim McNeil; Director: Ken Horler; Cast: Don Crosby, Max Cullen, Roger Newcombe
1973	Summer of the Seventeenth Doll	Writer: Ray Lawler; Director: Richard Wherrett; Cast: Bill Hunter, Reg Gorman, Melissa Jaffer, Marion Johns, Maggie Blinco, Rosalie Fletcher, Dennis Grosvenor
1973	President Wilson in Paris	Writer: Ron Blair; Director: John Bell; Cast: Max Cullen, Anna Volska, John Krummel
1973	Hamlet	Writer: Shakespeare; Director: John Bell, Richard Wherrett; Cast: John Bell, Brian Blain, Max Cullen, Arthur Dignam, Margo Lee, Anna Volska, Roger Newcombe, Ken Lawrence, Terence Clarke
1973	Kookaburra	Writer: Michael Cove; Director: Simon Hopkinson; Cast: Peg Christensen, Lloyd Cunnington, Jenny Brown
1973	Tom	Writer: Alex Buzo; Director: Richard Wherrett; Cast: Serge Lazareff, Anna Volska, Jacki Weaver, Sandra McGregor, Roger Newcombe, Jeanie Cullen
1973	A Hard God	Writer: Peter Kenna; Director: John Bell; Cast: Gloria Dawn, Gerry Duggan, Tony Sheldon, Frank Gallacher, Graham Rouse, Andrew Sharp, Kay Eklund
1973-74	The Marsh King's Daughter	Writer: Hans Christian Andersen; Director: Rex Cramphorn; Cast: Gillian Jones, Hugh Keays-Byrne, Ralph Cotterill

=== 1974 ===
Year	Title	Cast & crew
1974	Kookaburra	Writer: Michael Cove; Director: Richard Wherrett; Cast: Chris Haywood, Robyn Nevin, Peter Carroll, Maggie Dence, Tony Llewellyn-Jones, Simon Burke, Martin Vaughan, Elizabeth Chance, Ron Hackett
1974	The Bacchoi	Writers: Bryan Nason, Ralph Tyrrell; Director: John Bell; Cast: Jon English, Jeannie Lewis, Peter Carroll, Drew Forsythe, Tony Llewellyn-Jones, Anna Volska, Peter Chambers, Roger Newcombe, Julia Lyndon, Sharon Murphy
1974	How Does Your Garden Grow?	Writer: Jim McNeil; Cast: Robyn Nevin
1974	The Seagull	Writer: Anton Chekhov; Director: Richard Wherrett; Cast: Peter Carroll, John Bell, Peter Collingwood, Ruth Cracknell, Drew Forsythe, Tony Llewellyn-Jones, Anna Volska, Jacki Weaver, Maggie Blinco, Lloyd Casey, Tom Farley
1974	Jesters	Writer: Michael Cove; Director: Richard Wherrett; Cast: Peter Carroll, Tony Llewellyn-Jones Anna Volska, Shirley-Anne Kear, Colin Taylor
1974	Coralie Lansdowne Says No	Writer: Alex Buzo; Director: Ken Horler; Cast: Jude Kuring, John Orcsik, Berys Marsh, Robert Newman, Donna Akerste, Lloyd Casey, Kevin Howard
1974	The Ride Across Lake Constance	Writer: Peter Handke; Director: Richard Wherrett; Cast: Peter Carroll, Christine Amor, Kate Fitzpatrick, John Hargreaves, Anna Volska, Elizabeth Chance, Maree D'Arcy, Larry Eastwood, Alexander Hay
1974	My Foot, My Tutor	Writer: Peter Handke; Director: Richard Wherrett; Cast: Chris Haywood, Peter Carroll
1974-75	Well Hung	Writer: Robert Lord; Director: Ken Horler; Cast: Peter Carroll, Chris Haywood, Tony Llewellyn-Jones, Bill Hunter, Mary Ann Severne, Peter Corbett, Maggie Blinco

=== 1975 ===
Year	Title	Cast & crew
1975	Jesters	Writer: Michael Cove; Director: Brent McGregor; Cast: Peter Carroll
1975	Much Ado About Nothing	Writer: Shakespeare; Director: John Bell; Cast: Ivar Kants, Peter Carroll, Drew Forsythe, Robert Alexander
1975	Richard III	Writer: Shakespeare; Director: Richard Wherrett; Cast: Ivar Kants, Peter Carroll, John Bell, Melissa Jaffer, Tony Llewellyn-Jones, Robert Alexander, Deborah Kennedy
1975	Ginge’s Last Stand	Director: Ken Horler; Cast: Peter Carroll, Chris Haywood, Robyn Nevin, Kate Fitzpatrick, Bill Charlton
1975	No Man’s Land (double bill with Crossfire)	Writer: Jennifer Compton; Director: Ken Horler; Cast: Cornelia Frances, Barry Hill, Helen Boggis, Stuart Campbell, Elizabeth Chance, Elisabeth Crosby
1975	Crossfire (double bill with No Man’s Land)	Writer: Jennifer Compton; Director: Ken Horler
1975	You Want it Don’t You Billy?	Writer: Bill Reed; Director: John Bell; Cast: John Gaden, Robyn Nevin, Christy Hak, Maurice Tarragano
1975	Perfectly All Right	Writer: Alma De Groen; Director: Richard Wherrett; Cast: Ben Gabriel, Melissa Jaffer, Serge Lazareff
1975	The Joss Adams Show	Writer: Alma De Groen; Director: David Allen; Cast: Andrea Barge, Keith Gallasch, John McFadyen, Mary-Jane Saunders
1975	They're Playing Our Song	Writer: Jennifer Compton; Director: Richard Wherrett
1975	The Floating World	Writers: John Romeril, Ken Horler; Cast: Michael Caton, Ray Meagher, Craig Collinge, Les Foxcroft, Laurence Hodge, Marion Johns, Francis Yin
1975	Who Do They Think They Are?	Cast: Paul Daneman
1975	The Austral Muse	Cast: Grahame Bond, Carmen Duncan, Lionel Long, Garry McDonald
1975	Singles	Writer: Bill Reed; Director: John Bell; Cast: John Gaden, Robyn Nevin
1975	Kennedy's Children	Writer: Robert Patrick
1975-76	Mates and Brothers: Mates (double bill with The Christian Brothers)	Writers: Ron Blair, Peter Kenna; Director: John Bell; Cast: Don Crosby, Jon Ewing, Peter Fisher, Maggie Blinco
1975-76	Mates and Brothers: The Christian Brothers (double bill with Mates)	Writer: Ron Blair; Director: John Bell; Cast: Peter Carroll

=== 1976 ===
Year	Title	Cast & crew
1976	Sextet	Writer: Jennifer Compton, Alma De Groen; Director: Richard Wherrett; Cast: Peter Carroll, Ben Gabriel, Melissa Jaffer, Serge Lazareff, Kerrie Adams
1976	The Dark and Endless Sky	Writer: Jennifer Compton; Director: Richard Wherrett; Cast: Serge Lazareff, Arthur Adamov
1976	One of Those Girls	Writer: Jennifer Compton; Director: Richard Wherrett; Cast: Peter Carroll, Melissa Jaffer
1976	Poor Jenny	Writer: Jennifer Compton; Director: Richard Wherrett; Cast: Serge Lazareff, Kerrie Adams
1976	It Takes a While to Know One	Writer: Jennifer Compton; Director: Richard Wherrett; Cast: Peter Carroll, Melissa Jaffer
1976	All Over	Writer: Edward Albee; Director: Aubrey Mellor; Cast: Ben Gabriel, Patricia Kennedy, Maggie Kirkpatrick, Margo Lee, Max Osbiston, Reginald Gillam, Dallas Lewis, Felicity Gordon, Bill Bentley
1976	Martello Towers	Writer: Alex Buzo; Director: Richard Wherrett; Cast: Lynette Curran, Belinda Giblin, Harold Hopkins, Robin Ramsay, Greg Saunders, Alex Ciobo, Jessica Noad, Jennifer Cluff
1976	Mad, Bad & Dangerous to Know	Writer: Ron Blair; Director: Richard Wherrett; Cast: John Bell
1976	The Recruiting Officer	Writer: George Farquhar; Director: Ken Horler; Cast: Carol Burns, Peter Carroll, Max Cullen, Lynette Curran, John Gaden, Ivar Kants, Barry Otto, Chris Haywood, Martin Phelan, Robert Davis, Ric Hutton, Sandra McGregor, Paul Bertram
1976	The Elocution of Benjamin Franklin	Writer: Steve J. Spears; Director: Richard Wherrett; Cast: Gordon Chater
1976	Are You Now, or Have You Ever Been?	Writer: Eric Bentley; Director: Ken Horler; Cast: Bob Maza, Pat Bishop, Drew Forsythe, Lex Marinos, Barry Otto, lan Becher, Martin Harris, Robert Davis
1976	The Speakers	Writer: Heathcote Williams, Max Stafford-Clark, William Gaskill; Director: John Bell; Cast: Ronald Falk, Drew Forsythe, Tony Llewellyn-Jones, Richard Moir, Steven Tandy, Jenny Austen, Martin Phelan, Tim Gooding
1976-77	A Handful of Friends	Writer: David Williamson; Director: John Bell; Cast: Peter Carroll, Peter Sumner, Anna Volska, Russell McAlister, Judith Fisher, Wendy McAlister, Berys Marsh, Jill McAlister, Mark Marshall, Sally Marshall
1976-77	The Duchess of Malfi	Writer: John Webster; Director: Rex Cramphorn; Cast: Barry Otto, Ivar Kants, Peter Carroll, John Gaden, Carol Burns, Kris McQuade, Stuart Campbell, Jennifer Claire, Bill Conn, John Krummel, Bjarne Ohlin
1976-77	Travesties	Writer: Tom Stoppard; Director: Ken Horler; Cast: Barry Otto, Lyndel Rowe, John Gaden, Ralph Cotterill, Maree D'Arcy, Robert Davis, Bernadette Hughson, Matthew O'Sullivan
1976-77	Dirty Linen	Writer: Tom Stoppard; Director: Ken Horler; Cast: John Gaden, William Nagle, Johanna Pigott, Alan Tobin, Ralph Cotterill, Robert Davis, Elizabeth Mortison

=== 1977 ===
Year	Title	Cast & crew
1977	A Tentshow Pagliacci	Writer: Tim Gooding; Director: Richard Murphet; Cast: Peter Fisher, Lynda Gibson, Johanna Pigott, John Stone, Don Chapman, Julie Cox, Robert Davis, Tim Gooding, Melanie Kavanagh, Bruce Keller, Elizabeth Mortison, David Price
1977	Young Mo (or The Resuscitation of the Little Prince Who Couldn’t Laugh as Performed by Young Mo at the Height of the Great Depression of 1929)	Writer: Steve J. Spears; Director: Richard Wherrett; Cast: Gary Cosham, Marlene Dale, Gloria Dawn, Willie Fennell, John Gaden, Garry McDonald, John McTernan, Roy Ritchie, Sue Walker
1977	Going Home	Writer: Alma De Groen; Director: Richard Wherrett; Cast: Nancye Hayes, Chris Haywood, Gary Day, James Elliott, Catherine Wilkin
1977	Jack	Writer: Jim McNeil; Director: Ken Horler; Cast: John Clayton, Barbara Dennis, Martin Harris, Malcolm Keith
1977	The Club	Writer: David Williamson; Director: John Bell; Cast: Ivar Kants, Ron Graham, Ron Haddrick, Barry Lovett, Jeff Ashby
1977	Inner Voices	Writer: Louis Nowra; Director: John Bell; Cast: Tony Sheldon, Greg Zuckerman, Robert Alexander, Bill Conn, Robert Faggetter, Jane Harders
1977	Going Bananas: Bananas (triple bill with The Coroner’s Report & The Flaw)	Writer: Richard Bradshaw; Director: Richard Wherrett; Cast: Judi Farr, Ralph Cotterill, Robert Davis, Stephen Thomas
1977	Going Bananas: The Coroner’s Report (triple bill with Bananas & The Flaw)	Writer: John Summons; Director: Richard Wherrett; Cast: Judi Farr, Ralph Cotterill, Robert Davis, Stephen Thomas
1977	Going Bananas: The Flaw (triple bill with Bananas & The Coroner’s Report)	Writer: Mel Perrin; Director: Richard Wherrett; Cast: Judi Farr, Ralph Cotterill, Robert Davis, Stephen Thomas
1977	I’ll Be In On That	Anne Harvey
1977	A Stretch of the Imagination	Writer: Jack Hibberd; Director: Paul Hampton; Cast: Max Gillies
1977	Alitji in Wonderland	Writer: Lewis Carroll; Cast/Puppeteer: Richard Bradshaw
1977	Treasure Island	Director: Ken Horler
1977	Twelfth Night	Writer: Shakespeare; Director: John Bell; Cast: Barry Otto, Peter Carroll, Anna Volska, Drew Forsythe, Russell Kiefel, Berys Marsh, Gordon McDougall, Dennis Scott, Tony Sheldon, Graham Thorburn, Robert Alexander, Neil Fitzpatrick
1977	Much Ado About Nothing	Writer: Shakespeare; Director: John Bell; Cast: Peter Carroll, Drew Forsythe, Ivar Kants, Deborah Kennedy, Tony Llewellyn-Jones, Anna Volska, Gordon McDougall, Dennis Scott, Tony Sheldon, Alan Tobin, Robert Alexander, Maggie Blinco
1977	Ashes	Writer: David Rudkin; Director: Ken Horler; Cast: John Gaden, Geraldine Turner, Alan Belcher, Suzanne Roylance
1977	Fanshen	Writers: David Hare, William Hinton; Director: Richard Wherrett; Cast: Nico Lathouris, John Ley, Suzanne Roylance, George Shevtsov, Bill Summers, Stephen Thomas, Alan Becher, Tim Burns, Margaret Cameron

=== 1978 ===
Year	Title	Cast & crew
1978	Curse of the Starving Class	Writer: Sam Shepard; Director: Ken Horler; Cast: Hugh Keays-Byrne, Carole Skinner, George Shevtsov, Ray Anderson, Robert Davis, Benjamin Franklin, Malcolm Keith, Suzanne Roylance
1978	An Evening with Adolf Hitler	Writers: Jennifer Compton, Matthew O'Sullivan; Director: Ken Horler
1978	Rock-Ola	Writer: Tim Gooding; Director: Richard Wherrett; Cast: Tony Llewellyn-Jones, Kris McQuade, Robin Ramsay, Jacki Weaver
1978	A Visit with the Family	Writer: Greg Bunbury; Director: Richard Wherrett; Cast: Robyn Nevin, Gillian Jones, Margo Lee, Helen Morse, Brian Young, Louis Brown, Brandon Burke, Tom Farley
1978	Marxisms (triple bill with Stubble & Everyman)	Writer: Moya Henderson; Director: John Bell; Cast: John McTernan, Pierre Emery
1978	Stubble (triple bill with Marxisms & Everyman)	Writer: Moya Henderson; Director: David Bell; Cast: John McTernan
1978	Everyman: a Sentence Situation (triple bill with Marxisms & Stubble)	Writer: Rudi Krausmann; Director: John Bell; Cast: Nick Enright, John McTernan, Anna Volska, Jennifer McGregor
1978	The Comedy of Errors	Writer: Shakespeare; Director: John Bell; Cast: Drew Forsythe, John McTernan, Henri Szeps, Anna Volska, Maggie Dence, Tony Sheldon, Robert Hewett, Malcolm Keith, Elizabeth Lancaster, Robert Levis, Maggie Blinco, Robert Davis
1978	Kold Komfort Kaffee	Writer: Robyn Archer; Director: Ken Horler; Cast: John Gaden, Robyn Archer
1978	Patrick’s Hat Trick	Writer: Ross Skiffington; Cast: Don Bridges, Ross Skiffington
1978	There Were Giants in Those Days	Writer: Steve J. Spears; Designer: Ken Horler; Cast: David Argue, John Clayton, Basia Bonkowski
1978	The Job	Writer: Lloyd Suttor; Director: Ken Horler; Cast: David Argue, John Clayton
1978	Gone with Hardy	Writer: David Allen; Director: Richard Wherrett; Cast: Drew Forsythe, Henri Szeps, Kerry Walker
1978	Perfect Strangers	Writer: Ron Blair
1978	Steve Hansen	Cast/Puppeteer: Steve Hansen
1978	Metamorphosis	Writer: Franz Kafka; Director: Steven Berkoff; Cast: George Shevtsov, Paul Bertram, Margaret Cameron, Richard Collins, Ralph Cotterill, Janice Finn
1978-79	Jumpers	Writer: Tom Stoppard; Director: Ken Horler; Cast: John Gaden, Allan Chapple, Lewis Fitz-Gerald, Mary Haire, Barry Lovett, Glenn Mason, Tom Nichols, Martin Phelan, Walter Pym, George Whaley, Shane Withington
1978	A Dollar for an Autograph	Writer: George Dreyfus
1978	Stubble	Writer: Moya Henderson; Director: David Bell; Cast: John McTernan, Jennifer McGregor

=== 1979 ===
Year	Title	Cast & crew
1979	Life of Galileo	Writer: Bertolt Brecht; Directors: Ken Horler, John Gaden; Cast: Gillian Jones, John Gaden, Arthur Dignam, Drew Forsythe, John Frawley, Julie Hamilton, John Stone, Martin Vaughan, Paul Wentford, Les Amussen, Alan Becher, Stuart Campbell, Ian Suddard, Nicholas Raschke, Chris Orchard, Sean Fonti
1979	The Christian Brothers	Writer: Ron Blair; Director: John Bell; Cast: Peter Carroll
1979	Romeo and Juliet	Writer: Shakespeare; Director: John Bell; Cast: Mel Gibson, Simon Burke, Angela Punch McGregor, Peter Collingwood, Gerry Duggan, Drew Forsythe, Peter Kowitz, John McTernan, Sonja Tallis, Anna Volska, Kerry Walker, Keith Lee, Matthew O'Sullivan, Michael Smith, Craig Ashley
1979	Makassar Reef	Writer: Alex Buzo; Director: Ken Horler; Cast: Jeanie Drynan, Bill Hunter, Sean Scully, George Shevtsov, Davy Frinces, Julie Hudspeth, Monroe Reimers
1979	Travelling North	Writer: David Williamson; Director: John Bell; Cast: Jennifer Hagan, Julie Hamilton, Deborah Kennedy, Carol Raye, Henri Szeps, Frank Wilson, Graham Rouse, Tony Insergent
1979	The Bastard from the Bush	Writers: Henry Lawson, Rodney Fisher, Robin Ramsay; Director: Rodney Fisher; Cast: Robin Ramsay
1979	Upside Down at the Bottom of the World	Writer: David Allen; Director: Neil Armfield; Cast: Barry Otto, Kerry Walker, Paul Bertram, Sally Cahill
1979	Potiphar’s Wife + 2: Potiphar’s Wife (triple bill with Vicki Madison Clocks Out & Not I)	Writer: FF Piano (pen name of Margot Hilton); Director: Ken Horler; Cast: Julie McGregor
1979	Potiphar’s Wife + 2: Vicki Madison Clocks Out (triple bill with Potiphar’s Wife & Not I)	Writer: Alex Buzo; Director: Ken Horler; Cast: Helen Morse
1979	Potiphar’s Wife + 2: Not I (triple bill with Potiphar’s Wife & Vicki Madison Clocks Out)	Writer: Samuel Beckett; Director: Ken Horler; Cast: Julie McGregor, Helen Morse
1979	Sideshow in Burlesco	Composer: Martin Raphael; Director: Michael Matou; Cast: Cigarette, Kevin English, Fifi L'Amour, Michael Matou, Martin Raphael, Simon Reptile
1979	On Our Selection	Writer: Steele Rudd; Director: George Whaley; Cast: Geoffrey Rush, Noni Hazelhurst, Barry Otto, John Clayton, Jon Blake, Don Crosby, Vivienne Garrett, Robert Menzies, Julieanne Newbould, Kerry Walker, John Smythe
1979	Henry IV, Part 1 & Henry IV, Part 2	Writer: Shakespeare; Director: Richard Wherrett; Cast: John Bell, Peter Carroll, Drew Forsythe, Norman Kaye, John McTernan, Tony Sheldon, George Shevtsov, Mary-Lou Stewart, Frank Wilson, Alexander Hay, Robert Hewett, Ron Hackett, Aileen Britton
1979	The Sea	Writer: Edward Bond; Director: Richard Wherrett; Cast: John Sheerin
1979	Hancock’s Last Half Hour	Writer: Heathcote Williams; Director: Graeme Blundell; Cast: Bruce Myles
1979	From Laughing about the World to Living with the World	Writer: Bertolt Brecht; Cast: Ekkehard Schall
1979	Betrayal	Writer: Harold Pinter; Director: John Sumner; Cast: Elizabeth Alexander, John Stanton, Neil Fitzpatrick, Edward Hepple
1979	The Venetian Twins	Writer: Carlo Goldoni; Director: John Bell; Cast: Annie Byron, Jon Ewing, Drew Forsythe, John McTernan, Tony Sheldon, John Frawley, Barry Lovett, Jennifer McGregor, Tony Taylor, Valerie Bader
1979	Moving Being	Cast: Elisabeth Burke, Pierre Thibaudeau
1979	American Buffalo	Writer: David Mamet; Director: Peter Barclay; Cast: Brandon Burke, Graham Rouse, Stanley Walsh
1979	Family Man	Writer: John Croyston; Director: Neil Armfield

=== 1980 ===
Year	Title	Cast & crew
1980	Bullie’s House	Writer: Thomas Keneally; Director: Ken Horler; Cast: Bob Maza, Athol Compton, Justine Saunders, Kevin Smith, Bill Conn, Martin Harris, Don Reid
1980	Pirates at the Barn	Writer: Eleanor Witcombe; Designer: Neil Armfield; Cast: Simon Burke, Maggie Kirkpatrick, Louise Le Nay, Peter Fisher, Brian Blain, Leo Bradney-George, Russell Newman, Tony Taylor, Paul Bertram, Stuart Campbell
1980	The House of the Deaf Man	Writer: John King; Director: John Bell; Cast: Joseph Furst, Vivienne Garrett, Deborah Kennedy, Kerry Walker, Paul Bertram, Brian Fitzsimmons, Brian McDemott
1980	Every Good Boy Deserves Favour	Writer: Tom Stoppard; Director: Ken Horler; Cast: Graeme Blundell, Ralph Cotterill
1980	Ubu (double bill with L’os)	Writer: Alfred Jarry; Director: Peter Brook; Cast: Andreas Katsulas, Urs Bihler, Malick Bowens, Miriam Goldschmidt, Mireille Maalouf, Alain Maratrat, Bruce Myers, Jean-Claude Perrin
1980	L’os (double bill with Ubu)	Writer: Birago Diop; Director: Peter Brook; Cast: Andreas Katsulas, Urs Bihler, Malick Bowens, Miriam Goldschmidt, Arnault Lecarpentier, Mireille Maalouf, Alain Maratrat, Bruce Myers, Yoshi Oida, Tapa Sudana
1980	The Ik	Writer: Colin Higgins, Denis Cannan, Colin Turnbull; Director: Peter Brook; Cast: Andreas Katsulas, Natasha Parry, Asmund Bakka, Malick Bowens, Miriam Goldschmidt, Noel Kelly, Dean Martin, Bruce Myers, Yoshi Oida, Adrian Stanley
1980	A Dybbuk for Two People	Cast: Miriam Goldschmidt, Bruce Myers
1989	The Conference of the Birds	Director: Peter Brook; Cast: Andreas Katsulas, Alain Maratrat, Natasha Parry, Urs Bihler, Malick Bowens, Miriam Goldschmidt, Arnault Lecarpentier, Bob Lloyd, Mireille Maalouf, Bruce Myers, Yoshi Oida, Jean-Claude Perrin, Tapa Sudana
1980	Geraldine Turner Sings	Musical Director: Max Lambert; Performer: Geraldine Turner
1980	Inside the Island	Writer: Louis Nowra; Director: Neil Armfield; Cast: Judy Davis, Colin Friels, Paul Chubb, Annie Byron, Tyler Coppin, John McTernan, Dinah Shearing, Martin Vaughan, Katrina Foster, Martin Harris, Warren Coleman, Bill Conn, Tony Blackett
1980	The Beard	Writer: Michael McClure; Director: Rrats Bander; Cast: Rrats Bander, Fifi L'Amour
1980	Celluloid Heroes	Writer: David Williamson; Director: John Bell; Cast: Kate Fitzpatrick, John Gregg, Robin Ramsay, Kevin Smith, Peter Sumner, Henri Szeps, Alan Wilson, Barbara Stephens
1980	Traitors	Writer: Stephen Sewell; Director: Neil Armfield; Cast: Colin Friels, Judi Farr
1980	Clowneroonies!	Director: Geoffrey Rush; Cast: Geoffrey Rush, Pat Thomson, Gillian Hyde, Russell Newman, Tony Taylor
1980	Backyard	Writer: Jānis Balodis; Director: Terence Clarke; Cast: Bryan Brown, Michele Fawdon, Julie McGregor, Joan Sydney, David Atkins, David Slingsby
1980	You and the Night and the House Wine	Writers/Directors/Cast: Deidre Rubenstein, Tony Sheldon, Tony Taylor, Robyn Moase
1980	Krazy for You: Jeannie Lewis in concert	Director: Ted Robinson; Performer: Jeannie Lewis
1980	Oresteia	Writer: Aeschylus; Director: John Bell; Cast: Colin Friels, Kris McQuade, Carol Burns, Arianthe Galani, John McTernan, Anna Volska, Bill Conn, Ralph Cotterill, Paul Bertram
1980	Clouds	Writer: Michael Frayn; Director: Neil Armfield; Cast: Bob Maza, Max Gillies, Jennifer Hagan, John McTernan, Paul Bertram
1980	The Year of the Migrant	
1980	A Little Brown Hairy Eye	Writers: Henri Szeps, Chris Greenwood; Director: Rodney Fisher; Cast: Henri Szeps
1980	Sexual Perversity in Chicago / Reunion (double bill)	Writer: David Mamet; Director: Ken Boucher; Cast: Michael Caton, Lynette Curran, Henri Szeps, Candy Raymond, Celia de Burgh
1980	Volpone	Writer: Ben Jonson; Director: Neil Armfield, John Bell; Cast: Barry Otto, Colin Friels, John McTernan, Paul Chubb, John Bell, Peter Collingwood, Tyler Coppin, Linda Cropper, Tim Eliott, Pat McDonald, Paul Bertram, Bill Conn
1980	Sleep Never Rusts	Cast: Lance Curtis, Geoff Kelso
1980	The Heartache and Sorrow Show	Creators: Cathy Downes, Jenny Ludlam; Cast: Cathy Downes, Jenny Ludlam
1980	A Whip Round for Percy Grainger	Writer: Thérèse Radic
1980	Dreamers of the Absolute	Writer: Phil Motherwell
1980	Narrow Feint	Writer: David Knight
1980	Snakes and Ladders	Writer: Mil Perrin
1980	The Secret Life of Mr Gibney	Writer: Kenneth G. Ross
1980	Wolf Disease	Writer: Tony Page

=== 1981 ===
Year	Title	Cast & crew
1981	Judgement	Writer: Barry Collins; Director: William Gluth; Cast: Malcolm Robertson
1981	Concerning Poor B.B.	Writer: Bertolt Brecht; Director: Michael Brindley; Cast: Beverley Blankenship
1981	The Choir	Writer: Errol Bray; Director: Neil Armfield; Cast: Simon Burke, Tyler Coppin, Jim Holt, Tony Sheldon, Peter Kowitz, David Atkins, David Slingsby
1981	Anorexia Sometimes	Writer: Gillian Jones; Director: Kerry Dwyer; Cast: Gillian Jones
1981	Brandy Mime and Soda	Writer: Jean-Paul Bell; Cast: John Bear, Dave Gray, Jean-Paul Bell
1981	Accidental Death of an Anarchist	Writer: Dario Fo; Director: Brent McGregor; Cast: George Whaley, Deborah Kennedy, Robert Giltinan, Martin Harris, Paul Mason, Tony Taylor
1981	Los Trios Ringbarkus	Cast: Neil Gladwin, Stephen Kearney
1981	Busking with Brel	Musical Director: Michael Tyack; Cast: Neil Melville, Robyn Arthur, Lance Strauss
1981	Ampira	
1981	Physical Strength	Creator: Faye Bendrups; Director: Garry Ginivan; Cast: Faye Bendrups
1981	Slice	Writer: Tony Strachan; Director: Kim Carpenter; Cast: Su Cruickshank, Alexander Hay, Christine Mahoney, George Shevtsov
1981	The Pale Sergeant	Creator: Alexander Hay; Cast: Alexander Hay
1981	Sitting on a Fortune	Writer: Hilary Beaton; Director: Christine Koltai; Cast: Jenny Ludlam, Robynne Bourne, Maree D’Arcy, Gillian Hyde
1981	Corpuscle Chaos	Creator: Aku Kadogo; Cast: Aku Kadogo, Caroline Thompson
1981	Worse than Perverse	Creators: Jan Cornall, Elizabeth Drake; Director: Jenny Kemp; Cast: Jan Cornall, Elizabeth Drake
1981	Last Day in Woolloomooloo	Writer: Ron Blair; Director: John Bell; Cast: Peter Collingwood, Leslie Dayman, Pat Evison, Ronald Falk, Stuart Campbell, Robert Alexander, Ralph Cotterill
1981	Roses in Due Season	Writer: Doreen Clarke; Director: Fay Mokotow; Cast: Heather Mitchell, Carole Skinner, Sally Cooper, Martin Harris
1981	Slice	Writer: Tony Strachan; Director: Kim Carpenter; Cast: Su Cruickshank, Alexander Hay, Christine Mahoney, George Shevtsov
1981	Pinball	Writer: Alison Lyssa; Director: Chris Johnson; Cast: Jenny Ludlam, Cecily Polson, Kerry Walker, Natalie Bate, Paul Bertram, Roger Leach
1981	Eyes of the Whites	Writer: Tony Strachan; Director: Neil Armfield; Cast: Kerry Walker, Peter Whitford, Ron Becks, Roslyn Bobom, Christine Mahoney, John Posikei Alex
1981	Desert Flambe	Director: Chrissie Koltai; Cast: Deborah Kennedy, Jenny Ludlam, Jenny Hope, Gillian Hyde, Beverley Blankenship, Suzanne Dudley, Valerie Bader
1981	Cain’s Hand	Allan Mackay & Helmut Bakaitis
1981	Teeth ‘n’ Smiles	Writer: David Hare; Director: Neil Armfield, Gale Edwards, Chris Johnson; Cast: Michele Fawdon, Gillian Jones, Robert Menzies, Geoffrey Rush, Gary Waddell, Jack Weiner, Warren Coleman, Steve Coupe, Tony Strachan, Robert Davis, Ian Bowie, Tim Robertson
1981	Three Sisters	Writer: Anton Chekhov; Director: Aubrey Mellor; Cast: Ivar Kants, Barry Otto, John Bell, Cathy Downes, Michele Fawdon, Drew Forsythe, Ron Haddrick, Deidre Rubenstein, Anna Volska, John Allen, James Belton, Basil Clarke, Tony Mack
1981	Tales from the Vienna Woods	Writer: Ödön von Horváth; Director: Aubrey Mellor; Cast: Ivar Kants, Barry Otto, Cathy Downes, Jon Ewing, Ronald Falk, Michele Fawdon, Geneviève Picot, Deidre Rubenstein, Anna Volska, Aubrey Mellor, Ruth Thompson, Jonathan Ciddor, Michael Carlos, Rob Baxter, Brandon Burke, Roma Conway, Robert Alexander, Keith Bain, Victoria Feitscher
1981	Cloud 9	Writer: Caryl Churchill; Director: Aubrey Mellor; Cast: Colin Friels, Barry Otto, Anna Volska, Cathy Downes, Michele Fawdon, Deidre Rubenstein, John Walton
1981	Protest: Audience (triple bill with Private View & Protest)	Writer: Václav Havel; Director: Aubrey Mellor; Cast: Barry Otto, John Walton
1981	Protest: Private View (triple bill with Audience & Protest)	Writer: Václav Havel; Director: Aubrey Mellor; Cast: Cathy Downes, Barry Otto, John Walton
1981	Protest: Protest (triple bill with Audience & Private View)	Writer: Václav Havel; Director: Aubrey Mellor; Cast: Barry Otto, John Walton
1981	I’ve Got a Name	Writer: John Lonie; Director: Richard Tulloch; Cast: Jean Kittson, Ian White, Christine James, David Kerslake
1981	Nothing Matters	Writer: Barbara Berlin; Director: Kate JasonSmith
1981	Passengers in Overcoats	Writer: Gillian Jones; Director: Kerry Dwyer
1981	The Promise	Writer: Gail Prince; Directors: Chris James, Jade Kuring
1981	The World and Some Peacocks	Writer: Berwyn Lewis; Director: Ros Harin

=== 1982 ===
Year	Title	Cast & crew
1982	Medea	Cast: Lynette Curran
1982	A Woman Alone	Cast: Lynette Curran
1982	Female Parts	Writer: Dario Fo; Director: Fay Mokotow; Cast: Lynette Curran, Jude Kuring
1982	The Struggle of the Naga Tribe	Writer: Willibrordus S. Rendra; Director: Chris Johnson; Cast: Annie Byron, Cathy Downes, Carole Skinner, Bob Hornery, Robert Alexander, Brandon Burke, Tom Considine, Suzanne Roylance
1982	New Sky	Creator: Judith Anderson; Cast: Judith Anderson
1982	Woman: Glimpses into Her Story	Cast: Robyn Alewood, Camilla Blunden
1982	Not Still Lives	Writer: Suzanne Spunner; Director: Barbara Ciszewska; Cast: Andrea Lemon, Meredith Rogers
1982	When the Bough Breaks	Creators: Elisabeth Burke, Pierre Thibaudeau; Cast: Elisabeth Burke, Pierre Thibaudeau, Mary Shanahan, Cristina Wells, Christopher Williams, Sharon Williams
1982	I Am Who You Infer	Creator: Barbara Ciszewska, Meredith Rogers; Director: Barbara Ciszewska; Cast: Meredith Rogers
1982	Fair and Tender Ladies	Writer: George Hutchinson; Director: Anne Harvey
1982	Welcome the Bright World	Writer: Stephen Sewell; Director: Neil Armfield; Cast: Barry Otto, Max Gillies, Cathy Downes, Michele Fawdon, Katrina Foster, Martin Harris, Russell Newman, Craig Ashley, Brandon Burke
1982	Death of a Salesman	Writer: Arthur Miller; Director: George Ogilvie; Cast: Mel Gibson, Warren Mitchell, Judi Farr, Leslie Dayman, Lewis Fitz-Gerald, Peter Gwynne, Wayne Jarratt, Cecily Polson, John Stone, Rainee Skinner, Katy Brinson, Tim McKenzie
1982	Candide	Writer: Francois Voltaire; Director: John Bell; Cast: Jon Ewing, Philip Quast, Deidre Rubenstein, Rick Burchall, Jacqui Hall, John Hannan, Barry Lovett, Christine Mahoney, Karyn O'Neill, Tony Sheldon, Michael Smith, Tony Taylor, Susan Van Cott
1982	Demolition Job	Writer: Gordon Graham; Director: Anna Volska; Cast: Harold Hopkins, John Stone, Rob Steele
1982	A Hard God	Writer: Peter Kenna; Director: Kevin Jackson; Cast: Mark Lee, Simon Burke, Ron Graham, Ron Hackett, Judith Fisher, Bevan Wilson, Fisne Chamberlain
1982	Double Take	
1982	Aroma Billings - Exotic Artiste Ordinaire	Creator: Jan Cornall; Cast: Jan Cornall
1982	The Balek Scales	Writer: Heinrich Böll; Directors: Janice Burgess, Noel Maloney, Sue Sullivan, Ruth Thompson; Cast: Janice Burgess, Julie Bosch, Lindy Ferguson, Sally Mendes, Andrea O'Shea, Jo White
1982	Wild Violets and Honesty	Writer: Frances Hodgkins; Director: Kate JasonSmith; Cast: Shaquelle Maybury
1982	Sweetcorn	Writers: Cathy Downes, Jane Waddell; Cast: Cathy Downes, Jenny Ludlam
1982	The Dresses	Creators: Margaret Fischer, Christine Shaw, Bronwyn Vaughn; Director: Claire Teisen; Cast: Margaret Fischer, Christine Shaw, Bronwyn Vaughn
1982	Annie's Coming Out	Writers: Rosemary Crossley, Anne McDonald; Director: Ros Horin; Cast: David Hall, Josephine Lee, Nici Wood
1982	Hostages	Creators: Faye Bendrups, Alison Richards; Cast: Faye Bendrups, Alison Richards
1982	The Two Oddments or The Long and Short Of It	Director: Margaret Davis; Cast: Glenda Linscott, Wendy Strehlow, Rosalind Woolf
1982	Don't Thank Me	Writer: Pam Nilan; Director: Kerry Dwyer, Pam Nilan; Cast: Stuart Matchett, Peta Rotler, Nicola Scott, Theresa Wilkinson
1982	Vaudevillains	
1982	The Suicide	Writer: Nikolai Erdman; Designer: Aubrey Mellor; Cast: Peter Carroll, Angela Punch-McGregor, Ron Haddrick, Heather Mitchell, Carole Skinner, Annie Byron, Gordon McDougall, Leigh Rice, James Belton, Brandon Burke, Robert Alexander
1982	All the Boys	Writer: Linda Atkins; Director: Noni Hazelhurst
1982	Angels Affect	Writer: Lisa Jones
1982	Challengers for Supremacy	Writer: Christine Hawke
1982	Stripped	Writer: Stephanie McCarthy; Director: Dara Gunzberg
1982	The Tenth Hour	Writers: Sue Banks, Julie Williams
1982	Black Chrysanthemums	Writer: Angela Fewster; Director: Chris Johnson
1982	Easements	Writer: Mil Perrin; Director: Mil Perrin
1982	He Loves Me, He Doesn’t	Writer: Julie Finch-Scally; Director: Mil Perrin
1982	Invitation to Eternity	Writer: Linda Aronson; Director: Linda Aronson
1982	Just Talk	Writer: Laurel McGowan; Director: Alison Summers
1982	Kitsch	Creators: Peter Flynn, Mike Mullins; Cast: Mike Mullins
1982	No Flies on Biggles	Creators: Russell Cheek, Iaon Gunn, Ted Keijser, Claire Teisen
1982	Nothing That’s Nothing	Director: Robin Board; Cast: Gwenda Helsham
1982	Quiet Beguile	Writer: Craig Cronin; Director: Alan Belcher
1982	Sleep Never Rusts Twice	Cast: Lance Curtis, Geoff Kelso

=== 1983 ===
Year	Title	Cast & crew
1983	Ron Raygun in the Antipodes (The Oscar-Missing President)	Writer: Peter Kemp; Director: Fay Mokotow; Cast: Michael Adam-Smith, Julie Bailue, Jon Concannon, Jenifa Dwyer, Elwyn Edwards, Colin France, Kim Knuckey, Andrew Lucre, Terry Meller, Paul Meverley, Susheela Millburn, Jan Oxenbould, Susan Rigg, Les Ross, Carmen Russo, Peter Talmacs
1983	Party Wall	Writer: Ken Horler; Director: George Whaley; Cast: Robert Grubb, Sandy Gore, Jim Holt, Julie McGregor, Ray Keogh, Bill McCluskey, Robin Bowering, Robert Davis, Terry Bader, Alan Becher
1983	Tristram Shandy	Writer: Laurence Sterne; Director: Simon Phillips; Cast: Linda Cropper, Nick Enright, Michele Fawdon, Tim Robertson, Anna Volska, Robert Alexander, Marilyn Allen, Terry Bader, Brandon Burke, Suzanne Roylance
1983	Flash Jim Vaux: A Ballad Opera	Writer: Ron Blair; Director: Anna Volska; Cast: Phillip Scott, Robert Alexander, Valerie Bader, Maggie Blinco, John Hannan, Russell Newman
1983	Variations: Chamber Music for Nine Players and Six Instruments	Writer: Nick Enright; Director: John Bell, Nick Enright, Terence Clarke; Cast: Nancye Hayes, Deidre Rubenstein, Vivienne Garrett, Brian James, Patricia Kennedy, Kim Krejus, George Spartels, Robert Alexander
1983	New Sky	Creator: Dame Judith Anderson; Cast: Dame Judith Anderson
1983	Buffaloes Can’t Fly	Writer: Simon Hopkinson; Director: Chris Johnson
1983	A Night with the Right	Writer: Max Gillies, John Clarke, Geoff Atherdon, Patrick Cook, Paul Hampton, Alan John, Barry Oakley, John Romeril, Phillip Scott, Stephen Sewell, Peter Smalley, John Timlin, Don Watson, Heathcote Williams; Director: Paul Hampton; Cast: Max Gillies, John Clark
1983	Year 9 are Animals	Writer: Richard Tulloch; Director: Nici Wood
1983	Cocky of Bungaree	Writer: Richard Tulloch; Director: Chris Johnson; Cast: Carole Skinner, Tony Taylor, Martin Vaughan, Paul Bertram, Warren Coleman, Greg Dimmock, Christine Mahoney, Tony Sheldon
1983	Are You Lonesome Tonight?	Writer: Pamela van Amstel; Director: Peter Kingston; Cast: Simon Burke, Julie Hamilton, Lorna Lesley, Baz Luhrmann, David Courcier
1983	There’s a Ghost on Clark Island	Writer: Tony Taylor; Director: Chris Johnson; Cast: Tim Eliott, Genevieve Mooy, Barbara Stephens, Stephen Thomas, Valerie Bader, Maggie Blinco, Warren Coleman
1983	Burn Victim	Writer: Stephen Sewell; Director: Aubrey Mellor; Cast: Michele Fawdon, Barry Otto, Deidre Rubenstein, Anna Volska
1983	Beyond Mozambique	Writer: George F. Walker; Director: Aubrey Mellor; Cast: Tina Bursill, Kate Fitzpatrick, Neil Fitzpatrick, John Hannan, Terry Bader, Brandon Burke
1983	Uncle Vanya	Writer: Anton Chekhov; Director: Aubrey Mellor; Cast: John Bell, Michele Fawdon, David Nettheim, Barry Otto, Anna Volska, Eve Wynne, Myra Noblett
1983	The Marginal Farm	Writer: Alex Buzo; Director: Aubrey Mellor
1983	Miss Julie (double bill with The Bear)	Writer: August Strindberg; Director: Aubrey Mellor; Cast: Colin Friels, Judy Davis, Annie Byron
1983	The Bear (double bill with Miss Julie)	Writer: Anton Chekhov; Director: Aubrey Mellor; Cast: Colin Friels, Judy Davis, Annie Byron
1983	The Kid	Writer: Michael Gow; Director: Aubrey Mellor; Cast: Don Crosby, Jo Kennedy, John Polson, Carole Skinner, Nique Needles, Michael Horrocks, Gabrielle Mason
1983	Buck Privates	
1983	The Harlequin Shuffle	Writer: Tony Strachan
1983	Top Girls	Writer: Caryl Churchill; Director: Chris Johnson; Cast: Carmen Duncan, Vivienne Garrett, Jennifer Hagan, Sally McKenzie, Deidre Rubenstein, Odile Le Clezio, Isabelle Anderson
1983	As You Like It	Writer: Shakespeare; Directors: John Bell, Anna Volska; Cast: Leslie Dayman, Julie McGregor, Deidre Rubenstein, Rob Steele, Anna Volska, John Walton, Tony Taylor, Philip Dodd, Michael Johnson, Robert Alexander, Paul Bertram, Peter Carmody
1983	The Case of Katherine Mansfield	Writer: Katherine Mansfield; Cast: Stuart Devenie, Cathy Downes
1983	The Pack of Women	Creator: Robyn Archer; Cast: Jane Clifton, Judi Connelli
1983	Beyond Mozambique	Writer: George F. Walker; Director: Aubrey Mellor; Cast: Tina Bursill, Kate Fitzpatrick, Neil Fitzpatrick, John Hannan, Terry Bader, Brandon Burke
1983	Animal Farm	Adaptor: Malcolm Keith; Directors: Mark Ferguson, Jane Westbrook
1983	Animal Act of the Year	Writer: Ben Zion Weis
1983	Australia-Go-Round	Writer: Sandy Braun; Director: Jane Westbrook
1983	Bid Me To Love	Writer: Katharine Susannah Prichard; Director: John Smythe
1983	Brumby Innes	Writer: Katharine Susannah Prichard; Director: John Smythe
1983	The Burglar	Writer: Katharine Susannah Prichard; Director: John Smythe
1983	Halloran’s Little Boat	Writer: Thomas Keneally
1983	Cross Sections	Writer: John Sandford; Director: Peter Kingston
1983	Firebird	Writer: Rob Hood
1983	G for Game (double bill with Scenario X)	
1983	Scenario X (double bill with G for Game)	
1983	Gladbags	Writer: Patricia Johnson; Director: Jon Ewing
1983	Hess	Writer: Michael Burrell; Director: Edgar Metcalfe, Leslie Wright
1983	Marmalade File	Writer: Margaret Hilton
1983	Open Spaces	Writer: Harry Tighe
1983	Sky Without Birds	Writer: Oriel Gray
1983	Squeaking Pips	Writer: Margaret Hilton
1983	The Chelsea Pad	Writer: Mona Brand
1983	The Parker Pen	Writer: Dorothy Parker
1983	Virtue	Writer: David Allen
1983	Wet Dream	Writer: David Foster; Director: Andrew MacLellan

=== 1984 ===
Year	Title	Cast & crew
1984	King Lear	Writer: Shakespeare; Director: Aubrey Mellor; Cast: Colin Friels, Judy Davis, Gillian Jones, Kris McQuade, John Bell, Michael Carman, Peter Dahlsen, Jon Ewing, Michael Gow, John Howard, Peter Kowitz, Robert Menzies, Mark Minchinton, Bevan Wilson
1984	A Toast to Melba	Writer: Jack Hibberd; Director: Phillip Scott; Cast: Sally McKenzie, Phillip Scott, Martin Sharman, Duncan Wass, Bevan Wilson, Gaye MacFarlane, Meg Chilcott, Barry Lovett
1984	The Women of March the First	Writer: Lissa Benyon; Director: Carol Woodrow; Cast: Anna Volska, Suzette Williams, Melita Jurisic
1984	The Christian Brothers	Writer: Ron Blair; Director: Kevin Jackson; Cast: Rhys McConnochie
1984	Graeme King Lear	Writer: Barry Dickins; Director: Wilfred Last; Cast: Ray Baldwin
1984	Il Magnifico	Writer: Robyn Archer; Director: Aubrey Mellor; Cast: Colin Friels, Bob Hornery, Arky Michael, Dina Panozzo, John Walton, Carmen Warrington, Lee James, Jacqueline Kott, Geoffrey Williams, Brandon Burke, John Hannan
1984	The Golden Oldies	Writer: Dorothy Hewett; Director: Peter Kingston; Cast: Carole Skinner, Helen McDonald
1984	Performing Seals	Writer: Barbara Pepworth; Director: Chris Johnson
1984	Mystery of Mulligan’s Gold	Writer: Richard Tulloch; Director: Chris Johnson; Cast: Ron Graham, Pat Thomson, Richard Tulloch, Valerie Bader, Philip Dodd, Christine Anketell, Michael Johnson, Stephen Thomas
1984	The Servant of Two Masters	Writer: Carlo Goldoni; Director: John Bell; Cast: Drew Forsythe, Vivienne Garrett, Bob Hornery, Rosey Jones, Genevieve Mooy, John Stone, Jean-Paul Bell, James Belton, Jennifer Hope, Barry Lovett
1984	Salonika	Writer: Louise Page; Director: Aubrey Mellor; Cast: Judi Farr, Simon Burke, Gordon Glenwright, Gwen Plumb, Jo Lawrence Woodward
1984	The Boiling Frog	Writer: Alison Lyssa; Director: John Bell; Cast: Peter Collingwood, Susannah Fowle, Madeleine Blackwell, Robert Morgan, Tom Considine

=== 1985 ===
Year	Title	Cast & crew
1985	Cheapside	Writer: David Allen; Director: John Bell; Cast: Vivienne Garrett, Jim Holt, Denis Moore, Brandon Burke
1985	The Resistible Rise of Arturo Ui	Writer: Bertolt Brecht; Director: Richard Wherrett; Cast: John Gaden, John Bell, Peter Collingwood, Lynette Curran, Maggie Dence, John Gaden, Donal Gibson, Graham Harvey, Wayne Pygram, Henri Szeps, Jack Webster, Robert Alexander, Terry Bader, Danny Caretti, Garry Scale, Michael Harrs, Neil Fitzpatrick, Marian Dworakowski, Stuart Campbell
1985	Max Gillies Summit	Writer: Max Gillies; Cast: Max Gillies
1985	A Stretch of the Imagination	Writer: Jack Hibberd; Director: Jack Hibberd; Cast: Bruce Spence
1985	Woza Albert!	Writers: Mbongeni Ngema, Percy Mtwa; Director: Barney Simon; Cast: Mbongeni Ngema, Percy Mtwa
1985	Zastrozzi	Writer: George F. Walker; Director: George F. Walker; Cast: Colin Friels, Tina Bursill, Brandon Burke, Neil Fitzpatrick, James Laurie, Anna Lee
1985	Arms and the Man	Writer: George Bernard Shaw; Director: Richard Cottrell; Cast: Robert Coleby, Zoe Bertram, Maggie Dence, Ron Graham, Jane Harders, Barry Lovett, Stuart McCreery, Keith Spurr

=== 1986 ===
Year	Title	Cast & crew
1986	She Stoops to Conquer	Writer: Oliver Goldsmith; Director: Michael Rodger; Cast: Ivar Kants, Simon Burke, Deidre Rubenstein, Ron Graham, Elizabeth Alexander, Walter Brown, Rupert Burns, Celia de Burgh, Diana Denley, Barry Lovett, Kerry McKay, John Turnbull
1986	Wild Honey	Writer: Anton Chekhov; Director: Richard Cottrell; Cast: Ivar Kants, Ron Graham, Deidre Rubenstein, John Bell, Elizabeth Alexander, Walter Brown, Celia de Burgh, Diana Denley, Barry Lovett, Kerry McKay, John Turnbull
1986	The Merchant of Venice	Writer: William Shakespeare; Director: Richard Cottrell; Cast: Ivar Kants, Simon Burke, Ron Graham, Deidre Rubenstein, Elizabeth Alexander, Barry Lovett, John Turnbull
1986	All's Well That Ends Well	Writer: William Shakespeare; Director: Richard Cottrell; Cast: Ruth Cracknell, Simon Burke, Ron Graham, Edwin Hodgeman, Deidre Rubenstein, Wayne Pygram, Walter Brown, Elizabeth Alexander, Rupert Burns, Celia de Burgh, Diana Denley, Barry Lovett, Kerry McKay, William Neskovski, John Turnbull

=== 1987 ===
Year	Title	Cast & crew
1987	As Is	Writer: William M. Hoffman; Director: John Tasker; Cast: Nick Enright, Kathleen Allen, Marilyn Allen, Gary Down, Joss McWilliam, Lloyd Morris, Tony Poli
1987	Tartuffe	Writer: Molière; Director: John Bell; Cast: Robert Coleby, Elizabeth Alexander, Nicholas Opolski, Edwin Hodgeman, David Nettheim, Fiona Press, Scott McGregor, Valerie Bader, Daphne Grey, Barry Lovett, Mark Pegler
1987	The Winter’s Tale	Writer: Shakespeare; Director: Richard Cottrell; Cast: Colin Friels, Sonia Todd, Robert Coleby, Ron Graham, Graham Harvey, Edwin Hodgeman, Scott McGregor, David Nettheim, Fiona Press, Nicholas Opolski, Elizabeth Alexander, Daphne Grey. Valerie Bader, Andrew Menezel, Barry Lovett, Benjamin Brennan, Mark Peglet
1987	The Golden Age	Writer: Louis Nowra; Director: Egil Kipste; Cast: Sonia Todd, Ron Graham, Nicholas Opolski, Edwin Hodgeman, Scott McGregor, Graham Harvey, Melita Jurisic, Mark Pegler, Valerie Bader, Daphne Grey
1987	Les Liaisons dangereuses	Writer: Christopher Hampton; Director: Richard Cottrell; Cast: Hugo Weaving, Sonia Todd, Angela Punch McGregor, Melissa Jaffer, Deidre Rubenstein, Graham Harvey, Betty Lucas, Scott McGregor, Glynn Nicholas, Melita Jurisic
1987	Kiss of the Spider Woman	Writer: Manuel Puig; Director: Egil Kipste; Cast: Barry Otto, Russell Kiefel
