= Stephen Sewell (writer) =

Australian playwright and screenwriter

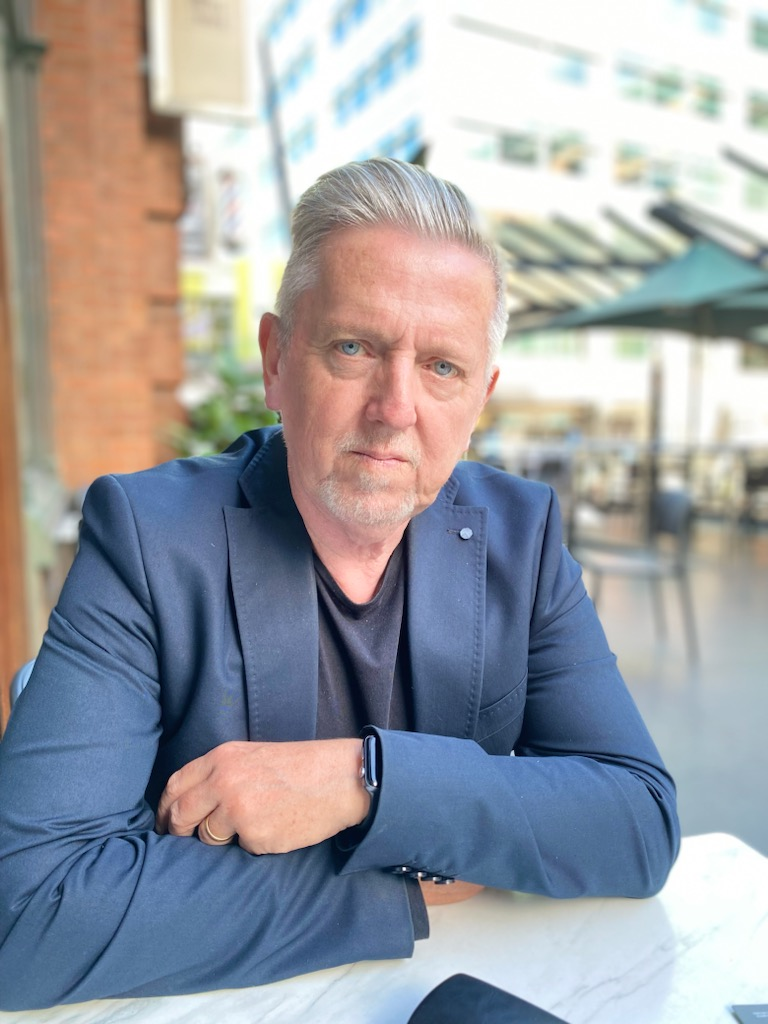
- Sewell in Sydney, 2023
- Born: 1953 (age 72–73)
- Occupation: Writer
- Agent(s): David Smith, Smith & MacDonald

Stephen John Sewell (born 1953) is an Australian playwright and screenwriter. He is best known for his play and later (1998) screenplay of The Boys.

== Early life and education ==
Stephen John Sewell was born in 1953 into a working class, Catholic family in Liverpool, New South Wales, Australia. He studied science at the University of Sydney, before deciding to become a playwright.

== Career ==
His short play Kangaroo was presented at a Sydney fringe theatre in 1975. His first full-length play, The Father We Loved on a Beach by the Sea was performed at La Boite Theatre in Brisbane under the artistic directorship of Rick Billinghurst in 1977.

His first major success was Traitors at the Australian Performing Group's Pram Factory in 1979, followed quickly by Welcome the Bright World, directed by Neil Armfield at the Nimrod Theatre in Sydney in 1981. In 1983 Armfield directed a production of The Blind Giant is Dancing by the State Theatre Company of South Australia. Also in 1983, BBC Radio produced a version of Traitors with David Nettheim.

Myth, Propaganda and Disaster in Nazi Germany and Contemporary America, A Play in 30 Scenes was directed by Aubrey Mellor at the Malthouse Theatre in 2003. Three Furies - Scenes from the Life of Francis Bacon was directed by Jim Sharman for the 2005 Sydney Festival.

In 1998 the film version of his play The Boys, directed by Rowan Woods, was released.

Sewell's work looks at the nature of power in society, and shows his commitment to radical social change, promoting egalitarianism and social justice. He has been influenced and inspired by many thinkers, including Democritus, Marx, Lacan, Hegel, and Zizek. His plays show passion, rage, and intellectual rigour, but also humour and hope. He has said of his work, "No artist, no creator, ever sets forth without hope, even if the thing they create appears to be carved out of pitch black despair".

Sewell was head of writing at the National Institute of Dramatic Art between 2012 and 2021.

He has won many awards, including winning of the New South Wales Premier’s Literary Award three times. In 2004 Sewell won the Louis Esson Prize for Drama at the Victorian Premier's Literary Awards for Myth, Propaganda and Disaster in Nazi Germany and Contemporary America: A Drama in 30 Scenes.

He is currently a researcher at the Australian National University.
