= Wedlocked =

Television series

Wedlocked is an Australian sitcom that ran for eleven episodes in 1994 on the Seven Network. It was created by Andrew Knight and Doug MacLeod.

== Premise ==
A single author of a marriage guidance book gets a "pretend" wife for appearances. The wife and her daughter move in with the author and his son.

== Production ==
Created by Andrew Knight and Doug MacLeod and co-written by Steve Vizard it was devised as a 13 part series.

== Cast ==
- Brandon Burke as Dr. Chris Gilchrist
- Dina Panozzo as Susie Abruzzo
- Richard Piper as Lex Dexter
- Kelly Sulikowski as Holly Abruzzo
- Paul Reardon as Ben Gilchrist
- Tony Barber as Tony Johnson
- Terry Gill as Ainslie Barton
- Robert Menzies as Carl
- Terrie Waddell as Julia
- Alan Hopgood as Father Damien
- Kym Gyngell as Harold
- Lynda Gibson as Deidre
- Bud Tingwell
- Kim Trengove as Beth

== Reception ==
Reviewing the early episodes The Age's Mark Lawrence says "the first two episodes just lacked that "spark", that something that turns a smile into a good loud laugh. But it made me happy enough to tune in again."

== See also ==
- List of Australian television series
