= Marcus Cooney =

Australian dramatist and theatre producer

Marcus Cooney (1937–1987) was an Australian dramatist and theatre producer.

== History ==
Cooney was born in Burnie, Tasmania and educated at St Virgil's College, Hobart, and at the University of Tasmania.

He joined the Tasmanian Education Department and spent some years as a science teacher on King Island. He was for a long time associated with the University of Tasmania's "Old Nick Company", acting in revues. It was there he met Michael Boddy; they began writing plays together, notably Cash (1972), about the bushranger Martin Cash. He collaborated with Ron Blair on Biggles (1970), which was produced by Sydney's Nimrod Theatre Company. Cooney, Blair and Boddy collaborated on the pantomime Hamlet on Ice, which included contributions from Grahame Bond and Rory O'Donoghue, of later Aunty Jack fame. He wrote and directed the play Between the Lines, with Alex Hay as Henry Lawson, at the 680 Playhouse (previously Independent Theatre, 269–271 Miller Street, North Sydney).

He wrote episodes for the TV series The Group for ATN7 (1971), A Nice Day at the Office (1972), Prisoner (1980) and A Country Practice (1982–1983).

He died at Binalong, New South Wales.
