= Jennifer Compton =

NZ/Australian poet and playwright

- Born: 1949 (age 76–77) Wellington, New Zealand
- Genre: drama poetry short stories
- Notable works: This City
- Notable awards: Kathleen Grattan Award

Jennifer Compton (born 1949) is a New Zealand-born Australian poet and playwright.

== Biography ==
She was born in Wellington, New Zealand, in 1949, and attended Wellington East Girls' College. In the 1970s, she emigrated to Sydney, Australia, with her husband Matthew O'Sullivan. They now live in Carrum in Melbourne.

After attending the NIDA Playwrights Studio, her play No Man's Land (later Crossfire) jointly won the Newcastle Playwriting Competition (with John Romeril's A Floating World) in 1974. It was premiered at the Nimrod Theatre in Sydney in 1975 and published by Currency Press in 1976. Compton returned from Australia to Wellington for several years at the end of 1975 and in August 1976 appeared in the play 'Fanshen' at Unity Theatre. In October 1976, Compton was awarded a $4000 bursary (for 1977) by the New Zealand Literary Fund. This bursary was awarded by the Literary Fund to enable writers to write full-time.

Her stage play The Big Picture was premiered at the Griffin Theatre in Sydney in 1997 and was published by Currency Press in 1999.

She has mostly written short fiction and poetry. A book of poems, Parker & Quink, was published by Ginninderra Press in 2004, and another, Barefoot, was published by Picaro Press in 2010. Barefoot was short listed for the John Bray Poetry Award at the Adelaide Festival in 2012.

Compton won the 2005 Peter Blazey Fellowship for "Who Doesn't Want Me to Dance".

This City was published by Otago University Press in July 2011 and won the Kathleen Grattan Award in New Zealand.

== Bibliography ==
=== Plays ===
- All Good Children Go to Heaven (1973)
- They're Playing Our Song (1975)
- All the Time in the World (1986)
- Julia's Song : A One Act Play (1991)
- The Big Picture (1999)

=== Poetry collections ===
- From the Other Woman (1993)
- Blue (2000)
- Brick: And Other Poems (2003)
- Parker & Quink (2004)
- Roma (2007)
- Barefoot (2010)
- This City (2011)
- Ungainly (2012)
- Now You Shall Know (2015)
- The Moment, Taken (2021)

==== Selected list of poems ====
Title	Year	First published	Reprinted/collected
Dead playwrights	1995	Compton, Jennifer (October 1995). "Dead playwrights". Quadrant. 39 (10): 31.	
Old friends	1995	Compton, Jennifer (October 1995). "Old friends". Quadrant. 39 (10): 32.	
