= Lynda Gibson =

Australian comedian and actress (1956–2004)

- Gibson as Matron Dorothy Conniving-Bitch in Let the Blood Run Free
- Born: Lynda Jane Wiseman Gibson; 21 March 1956
- Died: 2 January 2004 (aged 47)
- Other name: Gibbo
- Education: Nimrod Theatre Company
- Notable work: Let the Blood Run Free

Comedy career
- Years active: 1981–2004

Lynda Jane Wiseman "Gibbo" Gibson (21 March 1956 – 2 January 2004) was an Australian comedian and actress.

== Early life and education ==
Gibson was born on 21 March 1956.

After being trained at the Nimrod in Sydney, Gibson relocated to Albury–Wodonga to join the Murray River Performing Group in 1981. Gibson relocated to Melbourne four years later and became active in local theatre, stand-up comedy, and cabaret.

== Career ==
=== Live performance ===
In 1993, Gibson appeared alongside Sue Ingleton and Denise Scott in a stand-up comedy show called Women Stand Up!.

In 2001, Gibson appeared in a one-woman show at the Melbourne Fringe Festival called Lynda, It's Not Nasty, centred around her battle with ovarian cancer, and in 2003 appeared alongside Judith Lucy and Denise Scott at the Melbourne International Comedy Festival in Comedy Is Still Not Pretty.

She was known as "Gibbo".

=== Television ===
During the 1990s, Gibson appeared in a number of television programs. Most notably, she played Matron Conniving-Bitch in all 26 episodes of interactive spoof soap opera Let the Blood Run Free (1990–1994), which had been adapted from comedy collective The Blood Group's live stage version.

Other television shows Gibson appeared in include The Big Gig, Good News Week, Li'l Elvis and the Truckstoppers and Blue Heelers. Gibson also had a recurring role as Trish in the final series of Frontline. Gibson also appeared as Evonne—one of Darryl Kerrigan's neighbours in 1997 film The Castle.

== Death, posthumous recognition, and legacy ==
Gibson died at the age of 47 on 2 January 2004 following a four-year battle with ovarian cancer.

Following her death, the Melbourne International Comedy Festival introduced the Golden Gibbo Award in Gibson's honour.

In 2007, Gibson was posthumously added to the Victorian Honour Roll of Women.

== Filmography ==
=== Film ===
Year	Title	Role	Notes
1987	Bachelor Girl	Receptionist	TV movie
1988	Georgia	Policewoman 2	Feature film
1990	Jigsaw	Monique	Feature film
1994	Lucky Break	Library Clerk Carol	Feature film
1995	Gorgeous	Additional characters (voice)	Animated short film
1997	The Castle	Evonne	Feature film
1997	Skud	Renee	Short film
2000	Arctic Adventure	Kardia (voice)	Animated short film
2002	Guru Wayne	TV Audience Woman	Feature film

=== Television ===
Year	Title	Role	Notes
1986	Trapp, Winkle and Box	Rosie Winkle	TV series, 6 episodes
1986	The Fast Lane	Magda	TV series, 1 episode
1989	The Great TV Game Show	Impro Team	TV series, 16 episodes
1989–91	The Big Gig	Various roles	TV series
1989	Grim Pickings	Theresa Sullivan	Miniseries, 2 episodes
1990–1993	Let the Blood Run Free	Matron Conniving-Bitch	TV series, 26 episodes
1990; 1995	Neighbours	Marjory Beer / Dawn	TV series, 2 episodes
1994	Wedlocked	Deidre	TV series, 1 episode
1995; 1997	Frontline	Trish	TV series, 8 episodes
1996–98	Good News Week	Team Captain	TV series, 6 episodes
1997–98	Li'l Elvis and the Truckstoppers	Grace Jones (voice)	Animated TV series, 26 episodes
1998	House Gang	Julie	TV series, 5 episodes
1999	Pig's Breakfast	Di Bailey	TV series
2000	One Size Fits All	Self / various	TV series, 13 episodes
2002	The Secret Life of Us	Leonie	TV series, 1 episode
1994; 2001; 2003	Blue Heelers	Jan Parker / Peg Quinn / Kath Riordan	TV series, 4 episodes
2003	Kath and Kim	Health Spa Patient	TV series, 1 episode

=== Stage ===
Year	Title	Role	Venue
	The Natural Normans	Male sleazebag singer	Cabaret show at Edinburgh Festival
1981	Cocktail Clowns		Albury-Wodonga, South Albury with Murray River Performing Group
1981	School for Clowns	Pimple	Orange, Albury-Wodonga with Murray River Performing Group
1981	Crystal Dewdrops	Natasha P. Navoshka	Albury with Murray River Performing Group
1981	The Smith Family		Albury-Wodonga with Murray River Performing Group
1986	Cake - An Acland St Comedy		Theatre Works, Melbourne
1987	Royboys	Gail Noble / Policewoman 2	Studio Theatre, Melbourne with Playbox Theatre Company
1988	The Natural Normans		Anthill Theatre, Melbourne for Spoleto Fringe Festival (also writer)
1991; 1993	Let the Blood Run Free		Universal Theatre, Melbourne, Panorama Mezzanine, Melbourne
1991	Love Me Tender		La Mama, Melbourne
1992	Hymie / The Death of Minnie		Theatre Works, Melbourne
1993	A Night of Infectious Laughter	Comedian	Melbourne Athenaeum
1993	Women Stand Up!	Comedian	Players Comedy Club at Canberra Theatre Centre for The Comedy Summit
1993; 1994	Toothless Conniving Bitches	Comedian	Le Joke, Collingwood, Warehouse Theatre, Adelaide for Adelaide Fringe Festival
1994	Close Shave	Comedian	Comedy Cafe, Collingwood for Melbourne International Comedy Festival, Watershed Theatre, Auckland (also writer)
1994	Comedy Festival Charity Gala	Comedian	Melbourne Athenaeum
1996	From Dragges to Riches		Gerard Theatre for Adelaide Fringe Festival, Melbourne Town Hall for Melbourne International Comedy Festival
1996	Easy to Say	Liz	La Mama, Melbourne
1996	A Night of Infectious Laughter	Compere	Melbourne Athenaeum
1997	Away		Victorian regional tour with MTC
1997	Happy Birthday Jesus	Comedian	Trades Hall, Melbourne (also devisor)
1998	She'll Be Right	Comedian (one-woman show)	Melbourne Town Hall for Melbourne International Comedy Festival (also writer)
2000; 2003	Comedy is Not Pretty	Comedian	Synagogue Place for Adelaide Fringe Festival, Sydney Opera House with STC
2001	Lynda, It's Not Nasty	Comedian (one-woman show)	Arts House Meat Market for Melbourne Fringe Festival for Melbourne Fringe Festival (also playwright)
2001	This Way Up		Malthouse Theatre, Melbourne with Playbox Theatre Company
2003	Comedy is Still Not Pretty	Comedian	Melbourne Town Hall for Melbourne International Comedy Festival
