= Li'l Elvis and the Truckstoppers =

Australian animated musical children's TV series

- Genre: Musical; Animation
- Created by: Peter Viska; Esben Storm
- Written by: Ray Boseley; Robert Greenberg; John Armstrong; Kevin Nemeth; Pepe Trevor; Cameron Clarke
- Directed by: Peter Viska; Jan Van Rijsselberge; Robbert Smit
- Starring: Stig Wemyss; Kylie Belling; Marg Downey; Bill Ten Eyck; Michael Veitch; Lynda Gibson; David Cotter
- Countries of origin: Australia; France
- Original language: English
- No. of episodes: 26

Production
- Executive producers: Dr. Patricia Edgar; Christian Davin
- Producers: Susie Campbell; Patricia Edgar; Leslie Brown
- Editors: Ralph Strasser; Cliff Hayes; Damian Harland
- Running time: 24–26 minutes

Original release
- Network: ABC Television (Australia); France 2 (France)
- Release: 6 March 1997 – 14 April 1998

Li'l Elvis and the Truckstoppers is an animated musical children's television series and the Australian Children's Television Foundation's (ACTF's) first joint venture under the Distinctly Australian Program introduced by the Australian Prime Minister Paul Keating. The Director of the ACTF, Dr. Patricia Edgar, selected Peter Viska's character Li'l Elvis to design and co-produce the ACTF's first long-form 26-episode-series animation. As an original concept, not commissioned from overseas or based on an adaption of a classic story, production of the series on this scale was a massive undertaking for the Australian animation industry. With Li'l Elvis, an $11.5 million project, the ACTF opened up a new overseas market in partnership with France 2 and France Animation, a French production company, and Ravensburger, a German distributor, with the financial participation of Centre national de la cinématographie. A team of 90 animators and artists worked for 18 months including 39 trainees were employed on the production in support roles.

== Plot ==
The story follows a group of children and their adventures in outback Australia.

The title character of the show, Li'l Elvis, is a ten-year-old boy with the weight of the world on his shoulders. He has a gift for music, a talent for trouble, and a desire for only one thing: to find out who he really is and be a normal kid again. The opening sequence and music reveal that he was thrown out of a gold Cadillac in a guitar case, hinting that he is the illegitimate child of Elvis Presley (in real life, Presley only had one daughter named Lisa Marie). He is raised by foster parents, truck-stop proprietors Grace and Len, who are fervent fans of Presley. As Li'l Elvis is musically talented at both singing and playing the guitar, Grace is convinced he is Presley's son.

Li'l Elvis and his two friends, Lionel Dexter and Janet Rig, form the band "The Truckstoppers", and the show follows their adventures in the outback town of Li'l Memphis (formerly Wannapoo). Lionel is an Indigenous Australian boy who plays the didgeridoo and has a penchant for exclaiming "deadly", while Janet is a beret-wearing Asian Australian girl who plays the drums standing up, similar to The Velvet Underground's drummer Maureen Tucker.

The Truckstoppers' recurring enemy is the businessman W.C. Moore, who wants to become their manager to exploit them commercially, turning Little Memphis into a tourist attraction. He is also infatuated with finding deposits of the mysterious mineral Berkonium. He has a Berkonium marble, which he uses to beat children at the game of marbles, their major recreational activity. He also frequently electrically zaps his hapless limousine driver, Duncan.

== Characters ==
=== Main ===
- Li'l Elvis Jones – voiced by Stig Wemyss (Wendy Stapleton provides his singing voice)
- Lionel Dexter – voiced by Kylie Belling
  - Aboriginal actor and musician Tom E. Lewis provided Lionel's didgeridoo playing as well as the voice of Lionel's grandfather Dex, while Belling also provided the voice of Lionel's single mother Lillian, the schoolteacher for the children in Little Memphis.
- Janet Rig – voiced by Marg Downey
- W.C. Moore – voiced by Bill Ten Eyck
- Duncan – voiced by Michael Veitch
- Grace Jones – voiced by Lynda Gibson - the mum of the lead singer
- Len Jones – voiced by David Cotter - the dad of the lead singer

=== Minor ===
- Spike − Spike is a juvenile delinquent who picks on Li'l Elvis and mostly sides with Moore.
- Old Man Viska − Old Man Viska is an elderly European man who runs the local junkyard and is a retired firefighter and miner; he was present for the events that led to the legend of Old Man Izard.
- Old Man Izard − Old Man Izard is a European miner who was never found after a cave-in in the mines beneath the town; his ghost is said to haunt the now-closed mines.

== Episodes ==
=== Series 1 (1997) ===
No.	Title	Written by	Original release date
1	"Caught in a Trap"	Chris Anastassiades, Cameron Clarke and Esben Storm	1997
Tired of having to play the King's music every day at his adoptive parents' diner, The Roadhouse, Li'l Elvis wants to stop being the town of Wannapoo's main source of entertainment. When obnoxious Janet Rig moves into town and provides Li'l Elvis and his best friend Lionel with a drumbeat, they decide to form a band, known as The Truckstoppers, and the didgibilli sound is born. Meanwhile, legendary billionaire W.C. Moore moves into town to discover Berkonium all around Wannapoo and plans to collect the material in hopes of becoming even richer, while also coming up with big plans for the town.
2	"Boggled"	Chris Anastassiades and Wain Fimeri	1997
W.C. Moore reveals his plans to transform Wannapoo into a 1950's style theme park, based around the Truckstoppers, and rename the town Li'l Memphis. When he promises to bring Goondianna Smith, Li'l Elvis' hero, to the official renaming ceremony, everyone is overjoyed, except for Li'l Elvis, who promises to get rid of W.C's influence on the town. Meanwhile, the Truckstoppers hear a rumour about an old Bog-Man who lives below Li'l Memphis. Li'l Elvis and his friends go off to find the mysterious creature while trying to ignore W.C's plans.
3	"Li'l Memphis PTD"	Ray Boseley and Susan Macgillicuddy	1997
While working on projects at school for Parent Teacher Day, Janet pretends she doesn't care that her mother can't come as she's busy driving around Australia as a trucker. Janet makes up an excuse for her mother's absence and tells her classmates about the myth of the scary skull truck, a demonic trucker that her mother must fight against, protecting all of the Australian towns and cities.
4	"Wandering Star"	Susie Campbell and Cameron Clarke	1997
W.C. Moore plans on putting on a televised performance for the Truckstoppers so they can perform and be seen all around the world, showcasing their talent. When Lionel's grandfather, Dex, an ex-country singer, gives a pep-talk to the trio about the reality of performing, Li'l Elvis and the Truckstoppers run away into the desert, finding the whole idea too scary and subsequently getting stage fright. Though they might be lost, the Truckstoppers are doing a lot better than their rescuers who, led by W.C., are having a hard time battling the elements.
5	"I Hate My Own Birthday"	John Armstrong	1997
Since Li'l Elvis was found on the anniversary of the King's death, he must celebrate his day with Len and Grace's favourite celebrity and he hates it, never getting any attention. When the well-known hypnotist-interviewer, Dick Collingwood, comes to town to interview Li'l Elvis for his show "48 Minutes Plus Ads", he gets the idea to use Dick to find out the truth about how his parents found him and what happened on that night he was left at their doorstep. Meanwhile, Janet and Lionel want to make Li'l Elvis' birthday the best birthday ever by getting him whatever he wants but all Li'l Elvis wants is to go surfing, despite living in the middle of theAustralian outback.
6	"You Can't Buy The Playground"	Chris Anastassiades, Cameron Clarke and Mark Hopkins	1997
Li'l Elvis wants to join the school football team but he has a lot to learn. The amount of time practicing for the team affects his performing skills on stage and WC Moore has had enough. He builds a remote control football for Li'l Elvis and convinces the other players to stay out of his way during matches by bribing them with money, so he can be champion and become confident during football matches and performing with the Truckstoppers. Li'l Elvis learns the truth just as he's about to play the big match against the Noxious Weeds. Can he justify his place in the team?
7	"Goondianna Smith, the Wonder Years"	Chris Anastassiades	1997
Archaeological action adventure legends Goondianna Smith and Scotty, Li'l Elvis' favourite movie stars, are coming to Li'l Memphis to film "Goondianna Smith, the Wonder Years" and all of Li'l Memphis is buzzing with excitement. Li'l Elvis and Lionel land their dream roles as the two heroes. However, when Goondi explains he is more important than Scotty, who is just a sidekick, the whole town is divided. Film production ends up being a disaster and when both groups get themselves into deep trouble, the Truckstoppers must convince Goondi and Scotty to be friends again so filming can continue.
8	"Monkey Sea, Monkey Doo"	John Armstrong	1997
Li'l Elvis wants a pet but his mother thinks he's too irresponsible. Li'l Elvis discovers Sea Monkeys, the perfect low maintenance pet at a really cheap price. Meanwhile, the town gathers to watch Herb "Brittle Bones" Petrankovic's latest attempt at a new land speed record. When tragedy strikes, and Herb is blown sky high, Li'l Elvis is sent to buy a wreath and instead buys his Sea Monkeys. After abandoning them when he realises they are just wriggly bits of algae, he falls asleep, only to find himself somehow transported into the Sea Monkey world, where the Sea Monkeys are determined to make him pay for neglecting them.
9	"Bearing All"	Kevin Nemeth	1997
After looking for more merchandising opportunities, W.C. Moore learns about Li'l Elvis' favourite sporting hero, Roy Reno, and he decides to bring Roy to Li'l Memphis to meet his biggest fan. Li'l Elvis is excited to meet his favourite footballer and W.C. can't wait to get all the profits. However, the meeting between Li'l Elvis and Roy turns into a fiasco when he realises that Roy isn't really such a tough or strong guy after all after finding out one of his deep secrets. When Roy's caught in a trap of his own, Li'l Elvis has just the thing to get him out - a teddy bear.
10	"It's a Dog's Life"	John Armstrong, Pepe Trevor	1997
W.C. Moore plans on chaining up a local resident's dog, Anzac, because he's too violent and angry around visitors in town. The Truckstoppers secretly re-train the junkyard dog to be nice to tourists so he won't get chained up and they work day and night in hopes of getting Anzac to control himself around the town's visitors. The Truckstoppers are exhausted but are still determined to train Anzac into becoming a loving, sweet dog. Meanwhile, W.C. tells Grace the Truckstoppers should do more shows at the Roadhouse or else they'll end up becoming lazy, with bad demeanours and wasted lives.
11	"D.I.V.O.R.C.E"	Chris Anastassiades, Cameron Clarke and Vicki Madden	1997
After his many plans to take control over Li'l Elvis' career fail, W.C. finally comes up with his craziest scheme yet. He hires a reptilian lawyer, Rhonda Rorts, who convinces the kids of Li'l Memphis to divorce themselves from their own parents after telling the children they can do whatever they want, including no homework and junk food diets. Li'l Elvis soon realises that the plan was only made so WC can adopt him and take over his career, so when Rhonda traps him in a mine tunnel, he must try and get to the court-room trial on time to tell the kids about WC's true and evil plan.
12	"Duncan's Big Day Out"	John Armstrong and Kevin Nemeth	1997
En route to a concert, the Truckstoppers convince Duncan, W.C.'s loyal limousine driver, to visit his old town that he has fond memories of. As they arrive in Greensburg, the Truckstoppers and Duncan are shocked to find the citizens of the town turn on them on sight. The trio learns that the town was destroyed by W.C. Moore, in order to find the material Berkonium, and was sucked dry and left in a distasteful state, with Duncan regretfully helping W.C. along the way in order to achieve his goal.
13	"Fun in Apapulcolypse Now"	Chris Anastassiades and Gene Conkie	1997
Li'l Elvis discovers that famous Elvis Presley impersonator, Willard Kurtz, drove through the town of Li'l Memphis and performed a concert in town on the night he was left on Len and Grace's doorstep. Believing that Willard is his father and the key to his true identity, Li'l Elvis ignores his parents' arguments and travels through Li'l Memphis' mine tunnels with Janet and Lionel in search of Willard's last whereabouts: the Dark Heart Bar, so he can solve the mystery of his real father once and for all.

=== Series 2 (1998) ===
No.	Title	Written by	Original release date
1	"Kidnapped"	Chris Anastassiades	1998
W.C. Moore hires a pair of incompetent Slumbagen Marines to kidnap Li'l Elvis, so that W.C. can save him and become a hero in the boy's eyes. But while W.C. Moore is busy grandstanding for the media, his plans are quickly unravelling, as Lionel and Janet go looking for clues and Li'l Elvis proves himself more than a handful for his abductors.
2	"Good Boy, Cruel World"	Cameron Clarke, Gene Conkie and Robert Greenberg	1998
When W.C. Moore's newest employee, the gigantic Doris Glumhoffer, imposes a curfew, Li'l Elvis decides that maybe the town is better off without him. Li'l Elvis hits the road, only to find himself magically transported to Mooreville, a version of Li'l Memphis in which he never existed, where W.C. has complete control and is even planning to marry Grace! Li'l Elvis realises he is the only thing that stands between Li'l Memphis and toxic doom. Meanwhile, W.C. has made a discovery of his own - a stone chip from a statue is actually pure Berkonium.
3	"Space Junk"	Robert Greenberg	1998
In his constant quest to find Berkonium, the rarest mineral on Earth, W.C. plans to launch a rocket to sniff out Berkonium deposits from space. He convinces the townsfolk that the rocket is actually a satellite to transmit Li'l Elvis' music to the world. The kids overhear W.C.'s nefarious plan, but before they can do anything about it, they are accidentally blasted out into space.
4	"RoboPop"	TBD	1998
W.C. Moore enlists the help of mad scientist Dr. Rankenphile to build a worker drone robot capable of digging for Berkonium day and night. The robot doesn't dig very well, but it does a great imitation of Li'l Elvis. Suddenly, "Elbot" supersedes the Truckstoppers, giving W.C. an automated moneymaking machine. It sings, it dances, and best of all, it doesn't ask questions - or does it?
5	"Hopping Mad"	John Armstrong	1998
Lionel is a man with a mission - to beat the high score on the pinball machine set by Blind Magnus McApplecamp. Guided by Junior, his Seeing Eye frog, Magnus was an ace crop duster and pinball wiz. However, there are more than high scores at stake when Lionel discovers W.C. Moore intends to level One Tree Hill, Magnus' final resting place, and transform it into W.C.'s Wacky Watch and Wash World. Lionel realises the only way to save One Tree Hill is to break Magnus' record.
6	"Big Top Brouhaha – Haha"	TBD	1998
The Circus comes to town, but Li'l Elvis learns there's more to the Tingling Sisters' outfit than clowns, trapeze and cute expectorating llamas. For a start, all the performers are actually undercover agents trailing the notoriously pungent wildlife smugglers, the Zabaglione brothers. Unfortunately, no one will believe Li'l Elvis that the Zabaglione brothers plan to blow the circus to kingdom come at that night's performance..
7	"Billionairiosis"	TBD	1998
A huge flying dome lands on the outskirts of town. Hubert Howes, mysterious billionaire industrialist, has arrived. W.C. Moore is convinced that Howes has discovered his secret Berkonium mining activities and has come to cash in. While he and Duncan desperately try to infiltrate the sealed dome to confront Howes, Li'l Elvis manages to gain an audience with the world's most reclusive man and learns his secret - he's a ten year old boy who has no one to play with. In the process, Li'l Elvis confirms that W.C. is actually mining under Li'l Memphis, and must be stopped.
8	"Cardaholic"	TBD	1998
The Truckstoppers are booked to play at the opening of a new children's hospital in Li'l Memphis. The only trouble is, Li'l Elvis is nowhere to be found. He's busy trying to win a football card from Spike. It's the rarest footy card of all, the Roy Reno card that is rumoured to be cursed. Li'l Elvis will do anything for that card; play for it, pay for it, fight for it, and even make a deal with WC Moore.
9	"Know All"	Mandy Hampson and Christine Madafferi	1998
W.C. Moore hires 8-year-old psychic Dusty Hoffman, supposedly to predict upcoming fads in music and fashion for the Truckstoppers. The real reason for Dusty being in town is to help W.C. locate Berkonium. Dusty has her own plans however - she wants to be a Truckstopper. Li'l Elvis strikes a deal. Dusty can join the band if she helps them find out more about W.C.'s secret Berkonium mining. However, something strange happens to Dusty down in the mine when she comes face-to-face with the ghost of Old Man Izard.
10	"The Good, The Bad and the Hanky"	Mark Hopkins	1998
The sacred hanky of the King goes missing and all fingers are pointing at Li'l Elvis. In actuality, Willard Kurtz and his crew are impersonating the band; when they offer their services to relieve the kids, do they have something more nefarious in mind?
11	"Schmiko"	Robert Greenberg	1998
The people of Li'l Memphis are revolting and W.C. finds it disturbing. They accuse him of not being interested in the town any more, and everyone is suffering. In an effort to divert their attention from his secret mining activities, W.C. hires the world-renowned theatrical impresario, CamShaft, to stage a production of the 50's musical "Schmiko". It's full of hot rod cars, rock n' roll and hair grease, and Li'l Elvis is a natural choice for the lead. Unfortunately, it means he will have to kiss Janet, who plays Schmiko's girl, Gloria.
12	"Minors in the Mine"	Cameron Clarke	1998
Old Man Viska is not sleeping very well due to the constant sounds coming from the mineshafts beneath Li'l Memphis. Believing it to be the ghost of Old Man Izard, he decides to find out. It's the beginning of a journey that leads the Truckstoppers to W.C.'s Berkonium Super-Mine and an army of vicious robotic digging drones. The Truckstoppers barely escape, but when the half-crazed billionaire seals off the mine it seems certain that the Truckstoppers have played their final note.
13	"The Meanie From Down Under"	Ray Boseley	1998
Something strange is happening to Li'l Memphis. The buildings are starting to disappear, as if the ground is swallowing them up. Gradually, the whole town and all its occupants end up underground in the clutches of W.C. Moore. Faced with numerous failures and almost broke, W.C. has gone completely off the deep end and plans to keep them there forever, or until he finds Berkonium - whichever comes first. Only Li'l Elvis dares challenge the lunatic billionaire and they have their final showdown - a marble game for all the marbles and the future of the town.

== See also ==
- List of Australian television series
