= Richard Cottrell (theatre director) =

British theatre director (born 1936)

Richard Cottrell (born 15 August 1936) is an English theatre director. He has been the Director of the Cambridge Theatre Company and the Bristol Old Vic in England, and of the Nimrod Theatre in Sydney, Australia. He has also directed for the Royal Shakespeare Company, the Chichester Festival, the Stratford Shakespeare Festival in Stratford, Ontario, the National Theatre of Portugal, and other theatre companies around the world.

Cottrell is also a translator of plays, and an author of a book on art appreciation.

== Career ==
Cottrell was born 15 August 1936, in London. He attended Cambridge University, and trained as an actor in Paris.

=== Work in Britain ===
From 1964 to 1966 Cottrell was General Manager of the Hampstead Theatre Club. The first play he directed there was Georges Feydeau's The Birdwatcher, with Michael Bates and Prunella Scales.

From 1966 to 1969, Cottrell was co-founder and Associate Director of the Prospect Theatre Company in Oxford. His work for Prospect included works by Anouilh, Pinter, and Feydeau. His production of Farquhar's The Constant Couple, with Robert Hardy and Timothy West, transferred to the New Theatre in London. Cottrell's own translation of The Cherry Orchard, starring Lila Kedrova and Patrick Wymark, transferred to the Queen's Theatre in London in 1967. Cottrell was instrumental in the career of Ian McKellen, inviting him to star in, and directing him in, his acclaimed Richard II in 1969.

Cottrell translated Georges Feydeau for the Prospect Company, and, with Lance Sieveking, adapted E. M. Forster's Howards End and A Room with a View. With Edward Bond, Cottrell translated Three Sisters for the Royal Court Theatre.

From 1969 to 1975, Cottrell was Director of the newly formed Cambridge Theatre Company. There, in 1970 he directed his own translation of The Seagull, with Lila Kedrova as Madame Arkadina. In 1974 he directed the young Ian Charleson as Hamlet.

From 1975 to 1980, Cottrell was Director of the Bristol Old Vic Company, where his notable productions included The National Health, Hedda Gabler, As You Like It, A Doll's House, and A Midsummer Night's Dream.

=== Move to Australia ===
Cottrell became a resident of Australia in 1984. From 1985 to 1987, he was Director of the Nimrod Theatre Company in Sydney. He received a Sydney Critics Award for his first season, in which a permanent company of 16 actors played a season of classical plays in repertoire. His work at Nimrod included The Winter's Tale, Les Liaisons Dangereuses, All's Well That Ends Well, Wild Honey, The Merchant of Venice, and Arms and the Man.

For the Sydney Theatre Company, Cottrell has directed Lettice and Lovage and Vita and Virginia, both starring Ruth Cracknell. For the National Institute of Dramatic Art, he directed his own specially commissioned translation of Racine's Britannicus in 1992. For the Belvoir St Theatre in Sydney, he has directed When the Wind Blows; and for the Marian Street Theatre Company in Sydney he directed Benefactors, Prin, Henceforward..., Neville's Island, and Things We Do for Love.

Cottrell's work in Britain in the 1990s included The Rivals at the Chichester Festival and in the West End; The School for Scandal, Lady Windermere's Fan, also at Chichester; and Three Hours After Marriage for the Royal Shakespeare Company.

Cottrell's recent productions include Ying Tong, A Walk with the Goons, and Travesties for the Sydney Theatre Company. He has directed King Lear for the National Theatre of Portugal in Lisbon, The Uneasy Chair for Playwrights Horizons in New York, and Simone de Beauvoir's The Woman Destroyed at 59E59 in New York.

Cottrell has done opera directing as well. For the Victorian State Opera he directed Andrea Chénier, for which he won a Victorian Green Room Award for Best Opera Production of the Year, and Tannhäuser. For the Opera Theatre of St. Louis he has directed The Merry Widow.

=== Teaching ===
Cottrell has taught and directed at the Royal Academy of Dramatic Art in London, the Hong Kong College of the Performing Arts, Boston University, the University of California, the Juilliard School in New York, and all of Australia's leading theatre schools.

== Major directing credits ==
- The Birdwatcher, Hampstead Theatre Club, London, 1966
- Thieves' Carnival, Prospect Theatre Company, UK cities, 1966
- The Constant Couple, Prospect Theatre Company, UK cities, 1967
- The Cherry Orchard, Prospect Theatre Company, UK cities, 1967
- The Birthday Party, Prospect Theatre Company, UK cities, 1967
- Blithe Spirit, Prospect Theatre Company, Lincoln, UK, 1967
- The Promise, Prospect Theatre Company, Leicester, UK, 1968
- Richard II, Volkstheatre, Vienna, 1969
- Staircase, Prospect Theatre Company, UK cities, 1969
- Richard II, Prospect Theatre Company, UK cities, 1969
- The Alchemist, Cambridge Theatre Company, UK cities, 1970
- Semi-Detached, Cambridge Theatre Company, UK cities, 1970
- The Seagull, Cambridge Theatre Company, UK cities, 1970
- The Recruiting Officer, Cambridge Theatre Company, UK cities, 1970
- Chips with Everything, Cambridge Theatre Company, UK cities, 1970
- Hay Fever, Cambridge Theatre Company, UK cities, 1971
- Three Sisters, Cambridge Theatre Company, UK cities, 1971
- Trelawny of the 'Wells', Cambridge Theatre Company, UK cities, 1971
- You and Your Clouds, Cambridge Theatre Company, UK cities, 1972
- Popkiss, Cambridge Theatre Company, UK cities, 1972
- Ruling the Roost, Cambridge Theatre Company, UK cities, 1972
- Twelfth Night, Cambridge Theatre Company, UK cities, 1973
- Aunt Sally or the Triumph of Death, Cambridge Theatre Company, UK cities, 1973
- Jack and the Beanstalk, Cambridge Theatre Company, UK cities, 1973
- French Without Tears, Cambridge Theatre Company, UK cities, 1974
- Hamlet, Cambridge Theatre Company, UK cities, 1974
- Six Characters in Search of an Author, Cambridge Theatre Company, UK cities, 1974
- Bloomsbury, Cambridge Theatre, London, 1974
- Entertaining Mr Sloane, Cambridge Theatre Company, UK cities, 1975
- A Far Better Husband, UK cities, 1975
- The National Health, Bristol Old Vic Theatre, Bristol, U.K., 1975
- Hard Times, Bristol Old Vic Theatre, Bristol, U.K., 1975
- Macbeth, Bristol Old Vic Theatre, 1976
- Evening Light, Bristol Old Vic Theatre, 1976
- Le Weekend, Bristol Old Vic Theatre, 1976
- The Duchess of Malfi, Bristol Old Vic Theatre, 1976
- Aladdin, Bristol Old Vic Theatre, 1976
- Love's Labour's Lost, Bristol Old Vic Theatre, 1977
- Hamlet, Bristol Old Vic Theatre, 1977
- Hedda Gabler, Bristol Old Vic Theatre, 1977
- She Stoops to Conquer, Manitoba Theatre Centre, Winnipeg, MB, Canada, 1977.
- The Provok'd Wife, Bristol Old Vic Theatre, 1978
- The Seagull, Bristol Old Vic Theatre, 1978
- Cabaret, Bristol Old Vic Theatre, 1978
- As You Like It, Bristol Old Vic Theatre, 1978
- The Man Who Came to Dinner, Bristol Old Vic Theatre, 1978
- Destiny, Bristol Old Vic Theatre, 1979
- Troilus and Cressida, Bristol Old Vic Theatre, then Edinburgh Festival, both 1979
- A Bee in Her Bonnet, Manitoba Theatre Centre, 1979
- Waiting for the Parade, Lyric Hammersmith Theatre, London, 1979.
- A Midsummer Night's Dream Bristol Old Vic Theatre, London, 1980
- Edward II, Bristol Old Vic Theatre, 1980
- Illuminations, Lyric Hammersmith Theatre, 1980
- Cyrano de Bergerac, Milwaukee Repertory Theatre, Milwaukee, WI, 1980
- Betrayal, UK and European cities, 1981
- The Revenger's Tragedy, Adelaide, Australia, 1981
- Camino Real, Sydney, Australia, 1982
- The Taming of the Shrew, Mid-East cities, 1982
- The Taming of the Shrew, Hong Kong Arts Festival, Hong Kong, 1982
- All's Well That Ends Well, Stratford Shakespeare Festival, Stratford, ON, Canada, 1982.
- Uncle Vanya, Milwaukee Repertory Theatre, 1983
- Richard II, Stratford Shakespearean Festival, 1983
- The Country Wife, Stratford Shakespearean Festival, 1983
- A Doll's House, Bristol Old Vic Theatre, 1984
- Widowers' Houses, RADA, London, 1988
- Don's Party, Australia, 1984
- Pack of Lies, Brisbane, Australia, 1985
- When the Wind Blows, Sydney, 1985
- Arms and the Man, Nimrod Theatre Company, Sydney, 1985
- Benefactors, Nimrod Theatre Company, Sydney, 1986
- Wild Honey, Nimrod Theatre Company, Sydney, 1986
- The Merchant of Venice, Nimrod Theatre Company, Sydney, 1986
- All's Well That Ends Well, Nimrod Theatre Company, Sydney, 1986
- The Winter's Tale Nimrod Theatre Company, Sydney, 1987
- Les Liaisons dangereuses, Nimrod Theatre Company, Sydney, 1987
- Andrea Chénier, Victorian State Opera, Melbourne, Australia, 1988
- Strike Up the Banns, Theatre Clywdd, Wales, 1988
- The Rivals, Chichester Festival Theatre, 1994
- The School for Scandal, Chichester Festival Theatre, 1995; Theatre Royal, Bath, 1996
- Three Hours After Marriage, Royal Shakespeare Company, Swan Theatre, Stratford-upon-Avon, and Barbican Theatre Centre, London, 1996
- Lady Windermere's Fan, Chichester Festival Theatre, 1997
- Vita and Virginia, Sydney Theatre Company, 1997–1998
- King Lear, National Theatre of Portugal, Lisbon, 1997
- Bloody Funny, Lookout Theatre, Sydney, 1998
- The Uneasy Chair, Playwrights Horizons, New York, 1998
- Things We Do for Love, Marian Street Theatre, Sydney, 1999
- She Stoops to Conquer, Sydney Theatre Company, 2000
- Indian Ink, Canadian Stage Company, Toronto, 2002
- The Woman Destroyed, 59E59 Theater, New York, 2004
- Ying Tong, A Walk With the Goons, Sydney Theatre Company and Australian cities, 2007–2008
- Travesties, Sydney Theatre Company, 2009
- Loot, Sydney Theatre Company, 2011

== Bibliography ==
- Cottrell, Richard. Looking at Paintings: A Private View. Murdoch Books, 2009.
