= Death Defying Acts =

- Promotional movie poster
- Directed by: Gillian Armstrong
- Written by: Tony Grisoni; Brian Ward
- Produced by: Chris Curling; Marian Macgowan
- Starring: Guy Pearce; Catherine Zeta-Jones; Timothy Spall; Saoirse Ronan
- Narrated by: Saoirse Ronan
- Cinematography: Haris Zambarloukos
- Edited by: Nicholas Beauman
- Music by: Cezary Skubiszewski
- Production companies: FFC Australia; BBC Films; UK Film Council; Myriad Pictures; FTO
- Distributed by: Lionsgate (United Kingdom); Dendy Films (Australia)
- Release dates: 13 September 2007 (Toronto International Film Festival); 10 March 2008 (Australia); 8 August 2008 (United Kingdom)
- Running time: 97 minutes
- Countries: United Kingdom; Australia
- Language: English
- Box office: $8,380,329

Death Defying Acts is a 2007 supernatural romance film, directed by Gillian Armstrong, and starring Guy Pearce and Catherine Zeta-Jones. It concerns an episode in the life of Hungarian-American escapologist Harry Houdini at the height of his career in the 1920s. It was screened in a special presentation at the 2007 Toronto International Film Festival.

== Plot ==
In 1926, 13 years after his mother's death, illusionist and escapologist Harry Houdini has begun debunking mystics, psychics, and others who claim to have paranormal powers. He offers $10,000 to anyone who can quote his mother's dying words to him.

Impoverished and uneducated Scottish con artist Mary McGarvie and her daughter, Benji, set their sights on Houdini's reward when he visits Edinburgh on tour. Mary has a music hall psychic act that pulls in the public: Benji surreptitiously gathers information on the audience, which Mary uses to fake contact with their deceased loved ones.

Mary and Benji charm Houdini, spending time with him out of the public eye. However, Benji starts feeling isolated as her mother and the magician begin a relationship. She also has distressing dreams about being trapped in an underwater tank, and an angel-like figure with red hair. While initially suspicious and hostile, Houdini's protective manager, Mr. Sugarman, eventually tells Mary and Benji the truth: Houdini, busy doing a show, was unable to visit his mother on her deathbed, and is racked with guilt.

Mary, wearing Houdini's mother's wedding dress, performs the heavily publicized act surrounded by a crowd of reporters. When she has a crisis of conscience and attempts to leave, Benji begins seizing on the ground. She utters the words of the Kaddish, addresses Houdini as "Ehrich" (his real given name), and asks (in a mix of German and German-accented English) where he is. Houdini says, "I'm here, Mama," and begins crying next to Benji. (Whether her fit is genuine or staged is not specified.) When a note written to confirm the veracity of the experiment is shown to be blank, Houdini reveals to the press the "eternal shame" he feels because he wasn't able to reach his mother before she died. Thus, he was unable to comfort her in her moment of death and doesn't know her final words.

The McGarvies are awarded the $10,000. Mary becomes disgruntled, feeling Houdini does not love her as she believed. However, he visits the small cottage Mary and Benji share and confirms his feelings for her. They make love and spend the night together before Houdini leaves for a performance in Montreal.

Following Houdini's arrival in Canada, a "Red-Haired Prankster" abruptly punches him in the stomach, fatally rupturing his appendix. After calling for a doctor, Sugarman privately reveals that he told Mary and Benji the truth about Houdini's mother, hoping that the staged seance would provide him with closure; Houdini replies, "I know."

At a cinema in Scotland, Benji weeps while viewing newsreel footage about Houdini's death, in which he faces the camera and appears to bid goodbye. In a voiceover, Benji states "Houdini changed our lives. And for a wee short while, we taught him how to love".

== Cast ==
- Guy Pearce as Harry Houdini
- Catherine Zeta-Jones as Mary McGarvie
- Timothy Spall as Sugarman
- Saoirse Ronan as Benji McGarvie
- Malcolm Shields as Leith Romeo
- Leni Harper as Leith Romeo's wife
- Ralph Riach as Mr. Robertson

== Production ==
The film was shot on location in London and Edinburgh, and at Pinewood Studios, Buckinghamshire, produced by Myriad Pictures and was distributed by The Weinstein Company. Pearce spent six weeks learning Houdini's tricks from magician Ross Skiffington. Magic consultant for the film was English magician Scott Penrose.

== Box office ==
Death Defying Acts earned $2,839,345 at the Spanish box office, $800,505 in South Korea, $713,741 in Australia and $608,455 in Mexico. Globally, the film took $6,415,141. It was on a very limited release in larger markets, such as the United Kingdom, Canada, and the United States, resulting in low box-office takings.

== Critical reception ==
The film received mixed reviews, with a 42% rating on Rotten Tomatoes based on 38 reviews, with an average score of 4.98/10.

== Awards and nominations ==
- The APRA-AGSC Screen Music Awards of 2009 were issued on 2 November, by Australasian Performing Right Association (APRA) and Australian Guild of Screen Composers (AGSC) at the City Recital Hall, Sydney.
- 2009 APRA Best Soundtrack Album win for Death Defying Acts by Cezary Skubiszewski.
