= Every Good Boy Deserves Favour (play) =

1977 stage play by Tom Stoppard

Every Good Boy Deserves Favour is a stage play by Tom Stoppard with music by André Previn. It was first performed in 1977. The play criticises the Soviet practice of treating political dissidence as a form of mental illness. Its title derives from the popular mnemonic used by music students to remember the notes on the lines of the treble clef. The cast comprises six actors, but also a full orchestra, which not only provides music throughout the play but also forms an essential part of the action. A chamber-orchestra version also exists.

The play is dedicated to Viktor Fainberg and Vladimir Bukovsky, two Soviet dissidents expelled to the West.

== Plot ==
The play concerns a dissident, Alexander Ivanov, who is imprisoned in a Soviet mental hospital, from which he will not be released until he admits that his statements against the government were caused by a (non-existent) mental disorder.

In the hospital he shares a cell with a genuinely disturbed schizophrenic, also called Ivanov, who believes himself to have a symphony orchestra under his command. Alexander receives visits from the Doctor and from a Colonel in the KGB.

Meanwhile, his son, Sacha, is seen in a school classroom with a teacher who attempts to convince him of the genuineness of his father's illness.

== Production history ==
Because of the difficulties in staging a play that requires a full orchestra in addition to the cast of actors, the play is rarely performed.

Its 1977 premiere was staged at the Royal Festival Hall in London as part of Queen Elizabeth's Silver Jubilee and the John Player Centenary Festival, which marked 100 years of the tobacco manufacturer John Player & Sons. That performance featured Ian McKellen (Alexander), John Wood (Ivanov) and Patrick Stewart (Doctor), as well as the London Symphony Orchestra conducted by Previn. The play was then commercially recorded for RCA Red Seal (RCA ABL1-2855), with Previn conducting the London Symphony Orchestra, and McKellen, Stewart, Ian Richardson, Elizabeth Spriggs, Andrew Sheldon, and Philip Locke as the featured actors.

In 1978, the play was produced for television by the BBC. The producer was Mark Shivas and direction was shared by Trevor Nunn and Roger Bamford. The filming was undertaken at a live performance at Wembley Conference Centre in April 1978, conducted by Previn. The cast for this production was Ian McKellen (Alexander Ivanov), Ben Kingsley (Ivanov), Frank Windsor (Doctor), John Woodvine (Colonel), Barbara Leigh Hunt (Teacher), and James Harris (aka Jim Harris) and James Pickering as Sacha.

Following its BBC production, the play ran at the Mermaid Theatre in London during the summer and autumn of 1978. Cast changes included John Carlisle taking on the role of the Colonel from John Woodvine, who played Alexander Ivanov, Ian McDiarmid (Ivanov), Rowena Cooper (Teacher) and Rhys McConochie (Doctor). The role of Sacha was played by a number of young actors including Harris again, and Anthony Robb. Every Good Boy Deserves Favour was the last production at the old Mermaid before it was demolished and redeveloped.

In July and August 1979, the play was given a New York City run of eight performances at the Metropolitan Opera House, with a cast featuring René Auberjonois (Ivanov), Eli Wallach (Alexander), Carol Teitel (Teacher), Remak Ramsay (Doctor), Bobby Scott (Sacha), and Carl Low (Colonel Rozinsky).

In March 1980, E.G.B.D.F was performed with a full orchestra at Australia's Adelaide Festival, directed by the barrister and theatrical impresario Ken Horler, starring the film actor and writer Graeme Blundell (Ivanov), and the child actor and later writer and political activist Gordon Weiss.

Patrick Stewart directed and appeared in a 1992 production (produced by Charles Johanson for the Orange County Symphony) which toured to four US cities. The cast included his Star Trek: The Next Generation colleagues Gates McFadden, Jonathan Frakes, Brent Spiner and Colm Meaney.

The play was presented at Town Hall, Seattle and Kirkland Performing Arts Center, WA, in September 2000, by Boomer Classics and their director Shelley Henze Schermer. The production team included Arne Zaslove (stage director) and Adam Stern (conductor).

The play was performed in 2002 in Philadelphia as a collaboration between the Wilma Theater and the Philadelphia Orchestra, taking advantage of the fact that Previn had reorchestrated the score for chamber orchestra, making smaller productions possible.

In 2008, it was performed at The Town Hall in New York City by the Boston University College of Fine Arts, directed by Jim Petosa and conducted by Neal Hampton, as part of their Incite Festival. This production was revived (director, Jim Petosa, conducted by William Lumpkin) and played the Boston University Theatre in October 2009 and then again for two performances at Maryland's Olney Theatre Center in metropolitan Washington, D.C.

In July 2008, the Chautauqua Theater Company at the Chautauqua Institute, in western New York state, performed the play in conjunction with the Chautauqua Symphony Orchestra for the 25th Anniversary Gala of the theatre company. Ethan McSweeny was the director, with conductor Stefan Sanderling, Michael Emerson as Alexander and Brian Murray as Ivanov.

In January 2009, London's National Theatre mounted a fully staged theatrical revival on the National's largest stage, the Olivier Theatre, starring Toby Jones, Joseph Millson and Dan Stevens, with the Southbank Sinfonia as the featured orchestra, directed by Tom Morris and Felix Barrett. The production was critically acclaimed and was revived the following year for a second season.

Every Good Boy Deserves Favour received its first Carnegie Hall performance by the Toledo Symphony Orchestra on 7 May 2011 as part of the "Spring for Music" Festival. Cornel Gabara was stage-director for this performance, whose cast consisted of Pete Cross (Alexander), David DeChristopher (Ivanov), Yazan "Zack" Safadi (Sasha), Kevin Hayes (Colonel), Benjamin Pryor (Doctor), and Pamela Tomassetti (Teacher).

In April and May 2019, it was performed for 18 days in Tokyo and Osaka under the title of 良い子はみんなご褒美がもらえる.
