= Ken Horler =

Australian barrister and theatre promotor

Ken Horler AM (1938 – 16 September 2018) was an Australian barrister and theatre promoter. He studied law at the University of Sydney, and was appointed as a Queen's Counsel in 1986.

In his time as an undergraduate at the University of Sydney and in work as an articled clerk, he devoted some time in theatre work, which resulted in the 1970 establishment of the Nimrod Theatre Company with John Bell and Richard Wherrett. Horler was appointed a Member of the Order of Australia in the 1993 Queen's Birthday Honours for "service to the theatre, civil liberties and to the law".
