= Neil Fitzpatrick =

Australian actor

- Born: 1934; Williamstown, Victoria
- Died: 2005
- Occupation: Actor

Neil Fitzpatrick (1934–2005) was an Australian actor. For his performance in Pig in a Poke he won the 1978 Logie Award for Best Individual Performance by an Actor.

Born in Melbourne he first became a professional actor around 1957. He relocated to Great Britain where from 1964 to 1968 he worked with the National Theatre. Returning in Australia in 1969 and began working at the Old Tote Theatre.

He had a long stage career, with roles including Benefactors (1986), Canaries Sometimes Sing (1993) and Death Defying Acts (1997) at the Marian Street Theatre; The Christian Brothers (1992) at Kirribilli's Ensemble Theatre; Rookery Nook (1969–70) and Bent (1980) at the Russell Street Theatre in Melbourne.
