= Brandon Burke =

Australian actor

- Education: National Institute of Dramatic Art
- Occupation: Actor
- Years active: 1973–present
- Notable work: Glenview High; Wedlocked
- Awards: Logie Award

Brandon Burke is an Australian actor. For his performance in Glenview High he won the 1978 Logie Award for Best New Talent.

== Early life and education ==
Burke graduated from the National Institute of Dramatic Art in Sydney.

== Career ==
Burke has had a long theatre career.

Major screen roles he has played include rebellious student Tony Moore in the late 70s series Glenview High and the lead role of Dr. Chris Gilchrist in the 1994 TV series Wedlocked He appeared in television miniseries adaptations The Harp in the South and its sequel Poor Man's Orange.

== Filmography ==
=== Film ===
- 1979: The Odd Angry Shot – Isaacs
- 1995: Mushrooms – Lynch
- 2003: Liquid Bridge – Ramos
- 2019: Hearts and Bones – Doctor Matrozis

=== Television ===
Brandon Burke television credits
Year	Title	Role	Notes	Ref.
1977–1979	Glenview High	Tony Moore	Regular role	
1987	The Harp in the South	Tommy Mendel	TV miniseries	
1987	Poor Man's Orange	Tommy Mendel	TV miniseries	
1994	Wedlocked	Dr. Chris Gilchrist	11 episodes	
1999	Beastmaster	Castrone	Episode: "Amazons"	
2000	The Three Stooges	Harry Romm	TV movie	
