= Richard Wherrett =

Australian director (1940–2001)

Richard Bruce Wherrett
- Born: 10 December 1940; Australia
- Died: 7 December 2001 (aged 60)
- Occupation: Director
- Years active: 1970–2001

Richard Bruce Wherrett AM (10 December 1940 – 7 December 2001) was an Australian stage director, whose career spanned 40 years. He is known for being the founding director of the Sydney Theatre Company in 1979.

== Early life ==
Richard Wherrett was born on 10 December 1940, the younger brother of motoring journalist Peter Wherrett. Their father Eric was an abusive and violent alcoholic from whom the family would often escape to nearby cinema houses when he would fly into a rage. This, together with his mother Lyle McClintock's love of Jerry Lewis films played a big part in Wherrett developing an interest in show business and a talent for comic impersonations.

He was educated at Trinity Grammar School in Sydney, before attending the University of Sydney, where he graduated with a Bachelor of Arts in 1961. His contemporaries at the university included Clive James, Germaine Greer, Bruce Beresford, Mungo McCallum, Bob Ellis, John Bell, John Gaden, Laurie Oakes and Les Murray.

After falling off stage during a university performance of The Three Musketeers, Wherrrett abandoned the idea of acting, but discovered his love of directing while in London in the mid-1960s.

He taught English and Ancient History at Trinity Grammar for four years.

== Career ==
In 1965 Wherrett moved to London and worked with the East 15 Acting School in Loughton, Essex. He also directed at the London Academy of Music and Dramatic Art, the Lincoln Theatre Royal and Lancaster University.

=== Old Tote Theatre Company ===
He moved back in Australia in 1970, and worked for the ABC in South Australia, before becoming an assistant on King Oedipus and assistant director on Major Barbara, both for the Old Tote Theatre. Soon after, he was appointed associate director to Robin Lovejoy, as well as artistic director of the Australian Theatre for Young People. His tenure was short-lived, and he ultimately returned to London for a spell, teaching again at East 15.

=== Nimrod Theatre Company ===
In 1972 Wherrett moved back to Australia. He joined the Nimrod Theatre Company, and became co-artistic director in 1974, alongside John Bell, the year it relocated to its Belvoir Street premises. Most notably, Wherrett toured The Elocution of Benjamin Franklin, including seasons in London and New York, where it garnered Off-Broadway OBIE awards.

=== National Institute of Dramatic Art ===
Wherrett also directed at NIDA, including a 1976 production of Romeo and Juliet, starring Mel Gibson and Judy Davis.

=== Sydney Theatre Company ===
In 1979 Wherrett was appointed artistic director at the newly created Sydney Theatre Company (STC). He staged successful productions of The Sunny South, Chicago (which toured interstate and in Hong Kong), and an eight-and-a-half hour version of The Life and Adventures of Nicholas Nickleby (which also played interstate).

Wherrett procured Government funding for a new headquarters for STC and an extra performance space at what became Wharf Theatre, which opened in 1984. After eleven years, Wherrett resigned from the Sydney Theatre Company in 1990.

=== Other stage productions ===
Wherrett directed 127 professional theatre productions.

He directed the first performance of The Sweatproof Boy (1972), the first play written by Alma De Groen, of whom he directed most of her early works.

He also directed the Australian productions of Jesus Christ Superstar (1992), featuring John Farnham, Kate Ceberano, Jon Stevens, John Waters and Angry Anderson, and Disney's Beauty and the Beast (1995) starring Hugh Jackman, and Bert Newton. Other notable productions wereThe Stars Come Out (1996), a gala concert for the Sydney Gay and Lesbian Mardi Gras, Summer of the Seventeenth Doll (1996) for the Melbourne International Festival, the musical Cabaret (1997), Rhonda Burchmore's Red Hot and Rhonda (1997) and Bell Shakespeare's The Merchant of Venice (1998).

Wherrett also tackled opera, with Kurt Weill's Rise and Fall of the City of Mahagonny (1982) for Opera Australia, and Turandot (1987) for the Victoria State Opera. He also directed the world premiere of Summer of the Seventeenth Doll for the Victorian State Opera and Opera Australia.

His last major production was the Johnny O'Keefe musical Shout! The Legend of the Wild One, which toured interstate.

Wherett was the creative director for the lighting of the torch segment of the Opening Ceremony for the 2000 Olympic Games in Sydney.

From 1985 to 1988 Wherrett was a member of the Australia Council's Performing Arts Board.

In 1992 Wherrett became artistic director of the Melbourne International Arts Festival, but resigned after producing only two festivals.

=== Film ===
Wherrett's only feature film was musical comedy Billy's Holiday. He also directed two short films – The Girl Who Met Simone de Beauvoir in Paris and The Applicant (1981), and ABC TV play, The Girl from Moonooloo, with Jacki Weaver (1982).

=== Publications ===
In 1997 Wherrett and his brother Peter co-wrote the autobiographal memoir Desirelines: An Unusual Family Memoir. His own autobiography, The Floor of Heaven (2000) was dedicated to Jacki Weaver. He also wrote Mardi Gras! From Frock Up to Lock Up (1999).

== Directing ==
=== Stage ===
Year	Title	Role	Type
1970	King Oedipus	Assistant	Old Tote
1970	Major Barbara	Assistant Director	Tour with Old Tote
1971	The Man of Mode	Director	Old Tote
1971	The Roy Murphy Show	Director	Nimrod
1972	The Legend of King O'Malley	Director	Festival of Pacific Arts with Old Tote
1972	The Resistible Rise of Arturo Ui	Director	Old Tote (televised by the ABC)
1972	The Sweatproof Boy	Director	Nimrod
1973	Kaspar	Director	Nimrod
1973	Summer of the Seventeenth Doll	Director	Nimrod
1973	Hamlet	Director	Nimrod
1973	Tom	Director	Nimrod
1974	Kookaburra	Director	Nimrod
1974	The Seagull	Director	Nimrod
1974	The Jesters	Director	Nimrod
1974	The Ride Across Lake Constance	Director	Nimrod
1974	My Foot, My Tutor	Director	Nimrod
1975	Richard III	Director	Nimrod
1975	Perfectly All Right	Director	Nimrod
1975	They're Playing Our Song	Director	Nimrod
1976	Sextet	Director	Nimrod
1976	The Dark and Endless Sky	Director	Nimrod
1976	One of Those Girls	Director	Nimrod
1976	Poor Jenny	Director	Nimrod
1976	It Takes a While to Know One	Director	Nimrod
1976	Martello Towers	Director	Nimrod
1976	Mad, Bad and Dangerous to Know	Director	Nimrod
1976	Romeo and Juliet	Director	NIDA
1977	The Resistible Rise of Arturo Ui		Old Tote
1977	The Government Inspector		Old Tote
1977	Young Mo (or The Resuscitation of the Little Prince Who Couldn't Laugh as Performed by Young Mo at the Height of the Great Depression of 1929)	Director	Nimrod
1977	Going Home	Director	Nimrod
1977	Going Bananas (triple bill): Bananas, The Coroner's Report & The Flaw	Director	Nimrod
1977	Fanshen	Director	Nimrod
1977	The Elocution of Benjamin Franklin	Director	Malthouse Theatre with Nimrod
1978	Rock-Ola	Director	Nimrod
1978	A Visit with the Family	Director	Nimrod
1978	Gone with Hardy	Director	Nimrod
1979	Henry IV, Part 1 & Henry IV, Part 2	Director	Nimrod
1979	The Sea	Director	Nimrod
1979	The High and the Mitey	Consultant	Playbox Theatre with Malthouse Theatre
1979	The Elocution of Benjamin Franklin	Director	London & Theater 4, New York
1979-81	Cyrano De Bergerac	Director	STC
1980	The Sunny South	Co-director	STC
1980	Precious Woman	Director	STC
1981	Cat on a Hot Tin Roof	Director	STC
1981-82	Chicago	Director	Sydney Opera House, Theatre Royal, Comedy Theatre, Melbourne, Festival Theatre Adelaide with STC
1982	Amadeus	Director	Theatre Royal with STC
1982	Macbeth	Director	Sydney Opera House with STC
1982	Rise and Fall of the City of Mahagonny	Director	Australian Opera
1983	Present Laughter	Director	Theatre Royal, Sydney with STC
1983	Chicago	Director	Hong Kong Arts Festival with STC
1983	The Life and Adventures of Nicholas Nickleby	Co-director	Wharf Theatre with STC & Australian Opera; later played in Melbourne and Adelaide
1983	The Cobra	Director	Wharf Theatre & Melbourne Athenaeum with STC & MTC
1985	The Resistible Rise of Arturo Ui	Director	Nimrod
1985	Jonah Jones	Director	Wharf Theatre with STC
1986	Company	Director	Sydney Opera House with STC
1986	Hedda Gabler	Director	STC
1986	The Floating World	Co-director	STC
1987	Turandot	Director	State Theatre with Victoria State Opera
1987-88	Away	Director	STC & PepsiCo Summerfare Festival, New York
1987-88	Emerald City	Director	STC & in London
1988	Summer of the Seventeenth Doll	Director	Melbourne International Film Festival (televised by the ABC) & PepsiCo Summerfare Festival, New York
1988	Loot	Director	STC
1988	An Ideal Husband	Director	STC
1988	The Game of Love and Chance	Director	STC
1988	The Mortal Falcon	Director	STC
1989	Harold in Italy	Director	STC
1989	Romeo and Juliet	Director	STC
1989-90	A Midsummer Night's Dream	Director	Sydney Opera House with STC
1990	Once in a Lifetime	Director	STC
1992	Jesus Christ Superstar	Director	Harry M. Miller / IMG
1992	Einstein on the Beach	Director	Melbourne International Arts Festival
1993	Follies	Director	Melbourne International Arts Festival
1994	The Temple	Director	STC
1994	The Gift of the Gorgon	Director	QTC
1995	Beauty and the Beast	Director	
1996	The Stars Come Out	Director	State Theatre, Sydney for Sydney Gay and Lesbian Mardi Gras
1996	Melbourne's Regent Theatre reopening	Director	Regent Theatre, Melbourne
1996	Summer of the Seventeenth Doll	Director	Melbourne International Film Festival (televised by the ABC)
1997	Cabaret	Director	Footbridge Theatre, Sydney with Gordon Frost Productions
1997	Pageant	Director	Paddington Town Hall with Harry M. Miller
1997	Red Hot and Rhonda	Director	Crown Melbourne
1997	Navigating	Director	QTC & MTC
1998	Wunnerful Liberace	Director	STC
1998	The Merchant of Venice	Director	Bell Shakespeare
1999	Summer of the Seventeenth Doll	Director	Sydney Opera House
2000	Sydney Olympics Opening Ceremony - lighting of the torch segment	Creative Director	Sydney Olympic Stadium
2000–01	Shout! The Legend of the Wild One	Director	State Theatre, Sydney, Adelaide & Brisbane

=== Film ===
Year	Title	Role	Type
1981	The Girl Who Met Simone de Beauvoir in Paris	Director	Short film
1981	The Applicant	Director	Short film
1982	The Girl from Moonooloo	Director	ABC TV play
1995	Billy's Holiday	Director	Feature film

== Publications ==
Year	Title
1997	Desirelines: An Unusual Family Memoir
1999	Mardi Gras! From Frock Up to Lock Up
2000	The Floor of Heaven: My Life in Theatre

== Awards & honours ==
Year	Nominated work	Award	Result
1979	The Elocution of Benjamin Franklin	Obie Award Special Citation for direction	Won
1980	The Girl Who Met Simone de Beauvoir in Paris	Chicago International Film Festival Gold Hugo Award for Best Short Film	Nominated
1984	Services to the Theatre as a Producer & Director	Membership of the Order of Australia	Won
1990	Significant Contribution to Sydney Theatre	Sydney Theatre Critics' Circle Award	Won
2001	Shout! The Legend of the Wild One	Helpmann Award for Best Direction of a Musical	Nominated
2002	Richard Wherrett	Sydney Gay & Lesbian Mardi Gras Awards 2002 Hall of Fame Inductee (posthumous)	Won

== Personal life ==
Wherrett knew he was gay from the age of 17. Nevertheless, he had a well-publicised relationship with the actress Jacki Weaver from 1971 to 1974. Weaver claimed she always knew about Wherrett's sexual orientation, but nevertheless described him as the love of her life. She even moved back in with Wherrett to nurse him during his final days.

== Death and legacy ==
Wherrett died of liver failure on 7 December 2001, three days before his 61st birthday. It was also after warding off the effects of HIV for 15 years. His funeral service was held at St John's Anglican Church, Darlinghurst, with ushers provided by the Sydney Opera House. The General Manager of the Opera House, Michael Lynch, dimmed the lights on the Opera House sails in what Jacki Weaver called "a movingly fitting tribute".

=== Richard Wherrett Fellowship ===
The 'Richard Wherrett Fellowship' was created in his memory by the STC in his memory. Over the years it has been granted to the following recipients:

==== Recipients ====
Year	Recipient	Ref
2003	Joseph Couch	
2006	Wayne Blair	
2007	Lee Lewis	
2011	Sarah Giles	
2014	Imara Savage	
2015, 2016	Paige Rattray	
2017	Jessica Arthur	
2019, 2020	Shari Sebbens	
2021	Courtney Stewart	
2022	Ian Michael	
