= Vaněk plays =

Three plays by Václav Havel

The Vaněk plays are a set of plays in which the character Ferdinand Vaněk is central. Vaněk first appeared in the play Audience by Václav Havel. He subsequently appeared in three other plays by Havel (Protest, Unveiling, and Dozens of Cousins), as well as plays by his friends and colleagues, including Pavel Landovský and Tom Stoppard.

Today, the Vaněk plays are among Havel's best-known works. In English, they are principally known through the translations of Marketa Goetz-Stankiewicz.

== Origins ==
Ferdinand Vaněk first appeared in the play Audience in 1975 as a stand-in for Havel. Vaněk, like Havel, was a dissident playwright, forced to work in a brewery because his writing has been banned by the Czechoslovak Communist regime. In the course of the play, it becomes clear that the brewmaster has been asked to spy on him. A long, rambling, comic dialogue proceeds, in the course of which the brewmaster eventually becomes a sympathetic figure, rather than a villain.

Since Havel's work was banned, the play was not performed in any theater. Instead, it was performed in living rooms and distributed as samizdat. However, the work became quite well known in the Czech Republic, in part because of a widely circulated radio production of Audience.

Subsequent to 'Audience', Havel used Vaněk in the plays Unveiling, a comic one-act about a couple who desperately want Vaněk to absolve them for their collaborative relationship with the Communist regime, and Protest, in which Vaněk tries to convince an old colleague to sign a protest letter.

== Further Vaněk plays ==
Havel's Czech friends Pavel Landovský, Pavel Kohout, and Jiří Dienstbier all wrote subsequent plays starring Vaněk, and the character became a national symbol. Subsequent plays by other authors have also featured Vaněk, such as Tom Stoppard's play Rock 'n' Roll, which addressed the importance of music in Czechoslovakia, and Edward Einhorn's The Velvet Oratorio, which imagined Vaněk during the Velvet Revolution.

Havel himself wrote a short modern sequel to Unveiling entitled Dozens of Cousins in 2010.
