= Ron Graham (actor) =

British-Australian character actor (1926–2020)

- Born: Lionel Alfred Hosmer; 17 December 1926; Aldershot, Hampshire, England
- Died: 2 April 2020 (aged 93); Windsor, New South Wales, Australia
- Occupation: Character actor
- Years active: 1942-2003,
- Spouse: Aleda Klara Johnsen
- Children: Marcus Graham

Ronald Graham (born Lionel Alfred Hosmer, 17 December 1926 – 2 April 2020) was a British-Australian character actor who appeared in many theatre and television roles from 1950 until retiring in 2003.

Graham was born in Aldershot, Hampshire and started his career in 1942, when he joined the circus at 16, before his theatrical career in 1950.

He is best known for his roles in telemovies and guest roles in serials including many shows made by Crawford Productions and roles in popular serials Certain Women, A Country Practice and Home and Away. He was a regular in the short lived police-oriented soap opera Waterloo Station (1983) and featured in the film Gallipoli.

== Personal life ==
Ron Graham was born Lionel Alfred Hosmer, the second son of 3 boys to William Alfred Hosmer (1896–1953) and Doris Agatha (nee Green) (1897–1978) in Aldershot, UK. In 1928, the family moved to Vancouver, British Columbia, Canada. Lionel joined the British Army and in July 1948, his parents and two brothers emigrated to Australia from the United Kingdom. Lionel demobbed from the Army in 1949 and then migrated to Australia, settling in Perth. He changed his name by deed poll to Ron Graham.

He first married in the early 1960s to Judith Schonell, a dancer with the West Australian State Ballet. Their son Marcus Graham is a well-known Australian stage, television and film actor and director. Ron later partnered with Aleda Klara Johnsen.

He died in Windsor, New South Wales on 2 April 2020 at the age of 93.

== Filmography ==
=== Film ===
Year	Title	Role	Notes
1961	The Merchant of Venice	Basanio	TV movie
1969	The Intruders	Peter Yordan	Film
1970	The Curious Female	Doorman	
1981	Gallipoli	Wallace Hamilton	Feature film
1982	Fluteman	Frank Timms	Feature film
1984	Silver City	Director	Feature film
1986	Whose Baby	Jack Galbsally	TV movie
1996	Acri	Norris	
1998	13 Gantry Row	Loan's Manager	TV movie
1999	Time and Tide	Harry	TV movie
2000	Portrait of a Suspect	American Police Detective	TV movie
2003	BlackJack Murder Archive	Brian Kirsten	TV movie

=== Television ===
Year	Title	Role	Notes
1961	Whiplash	Alfred	TV series
1967	Contrabandits	Detective Sergeant Thomson	TV series
1967	Love and War		TV miniseries, episode: War 3: Sergeant Musgrave's Dance
1969	Riptide	Chris Bolan	TV series
1971	Mrs. Finnegan	Joe Fagan	TV series
1969–71	Dynasty	John Mason	TV series
1972	Boney	Mike Taylor	TV series
1972	The Spoiler	Dave Sharpe	TV series
1971–72	Spyforce	Ron (pilot) (uncredited)	TV series
1973	A Taste for Blue Ribbons		TV series
1973	Ryan	Sergeant Nelson	TV series
1971–73	Matlock Police	4 roles: -Brian Woods -Ron Grey -Sam Winter -Leo "Bullfrog" Bennett	TV series
1968–73	Homicide	5 roles: -Allan Farrow -Sgt. Ron Lane -Don Carlisle -David Warner -Bill Young	TV series
1969–74	Division 4	4 roles: -Chris Granger -Len Abbott -John Moore -Laurie Cornell	TV series
1973–76	Certain Women	Alan Stone	TV series
1978	Young Ramsay	Bruce Watt	TV series
1977–78	Glenview High	Frank Faulkner	TV series
1978	Cass		TV series
1978	Cop Shop	2 roles -Ralph Curran -Peter Curran	TV series
1979	Ride on Stranger	Darcey Jones	TV series
1981	Kingswood Country	Mr. GMH	TV series
1981	Bellamy	Trotter	TV series
1981	Sporting Chance		TV series
1982	1915	Army Sergeant	TV miniseries
1982	MPSIB	Max Birch	TV series
1983	Waterloo Station	DS Jack Edwards	TV series
1983	Silent Reach	Father Vakldera	TV miniseries
1985	Winners	Abattoir Manager	TV series
1986	Alice to Nowhere	Denzil Leary	TV miniseries
1988	Rafferty's Rules	Frank White	TV series
1989	Mission: Impossible	Challis	TV series
1981–92	A Country Practice	5 roles: -Andy McKay -Harry Martin -Bill Jones -Tom Spencer -Bill Morrison	TV series
1994	Time Trax	Casey	TV series
1994	Heartbreak High	Detective Monaghan	TV series
1995	Blue Murder	Senior Officer	TV miniseries
1991–96	G.P.	2 roles: -Angus Sutton (1991) -Jim Stewart (1996)	TV series
1997	Home and Away	Murray Watson	TV series
1997	Big Sky	Tom	TV series
2001	Outriders	Mr. Murray	TV series
2003	Snobs	Mr. Ford	TV series
