= Alain Maratrat =

French actor and director

Alain Maratrat (born 1950) is a French actor, theater and opera director known for his innovative interpretations and staging. He has shared his longtime exploration of the body as an instrument of theatrical expression through workshops and classes for actors, dancers, and singers, throughout the world. He was a winner of a Golden Mask award in 2006, as director of the opera Il Viaggio a Reims.

== Biography ==
=== Early life ===
Alain Maratrat was born in Paris into a family far from the world of art; his father was a train conductor and his mother had stopped working as a dressmaker to raise her children. He attended the Institute National des Arts du Spectacle in Brussels, Belgium from 1969 to 1973 and, thirty years later, joined 3 fellow students from the class of ‘73 to play their younger selves in Trente Ans a Peine, a play by Jean-Claude Carrière, which was based on their acting aspirations and experiences at INSAS.

== Career ==
In 1974 Maratrat was invited to join Peter Brook’ s company, the International Centre for Theatre Research, and he remained an active member of the company for nearly 20 years, participating in most of the company's successful productions. He acted, experimented and traveled the world with Brook's multi-cultural assembly of actors, dancers, musicians and other performers. They participated in theatrical encounters with audiences in native villages, asylums schools and a prison, as well as traditional theaters throughout the world. Working with Brook fed and developed Maratrat's interest in creating theater that would touch and enliven ordinary people, regardless of their culture. Since leaving Brook's company, Maratrat has managed active careers as an actor (film, theater and television), theater and opera director, and acting teacher.

He has performed in films by directors Claude Berri, Amos Gitai, Michel Deville and Alain Berberian and plays directed by Bruno Bayen, Philippe Mantha, Gabriel Garran, Peter Brook, Dominique Mühler, Bernard Sobel and Gaston Jung. Maratrat has directed theatrical productions of Ferenc Molnár's Liliom (1991), Dumas’ The Three Musketeers (1993) and Gaston Salvatore's Staline (1994). Braz's Rencontres (1995) was staged after a year-long collective workshop. He directed Goldoni's The Impresario from Smyrna and The Dance Lesson (1996). In 1998 he directed The Conference of Birds with the Teatro Kismet and a group of international actors in Bari, Italy, and in 1999 he traveled to South Africa to direct Romeo was a Shoeshiner with social centers in the townships of Pretoria. More recent productions include Shakespeare's A Midsummer Night ́s Dream (2003), Chekhov's The Three Sisters (2004), Ibsen's Peer Gynt (2004), Marivaux's The Dispute (2005), Shakespeare's The Twelfth Night (2006) and Schiller's Marie Stuart (2011).

He began his career as an opera director in 1981 with The Love of Three Oranges by Prokofiev. Since then, he has directed productions including: L ́Étoile by Chabrier (1982), Les Voyages de Monsieur Broucek by Leoš Janáček, conducted by Gilbert Amy (1982), Offenbach's Les Brigands, conducted by Sir John Eliot Gardiner (1987), and Martinu's Les Trois Souhaits, conducted by Kent Nagano (1990). He was both librettist and director of Passeport Musical Pour Paris with Mstislav Rostropovich (1991). In 1992 he created the original opera Zarzuela, Historia de un Patio, followed by Saleri's Falstaff, conducted by Jean-Claude Malgoire (1996), and Kodály's Harry Janos (1998), for which he also adapted the libretto.

In 2004, Maratrat was contacted by Jean-Pierre Brossmann, director of the Theatre du Chatelet, about directing Rosinni's Il Viaggio a Reims. The Chatelet was co-producing the opera with maestro Valery Gergiev and the Mariinsky Theater in Saint Petersburg. With Gergiev's blessing, Maratrat immediately began In depth work with the Mariinsky's Academy of Young Singers, who would be performing, and his creative team Pierre-Alain Bertola, (set design), Mireille Dessingy (costumes), and Pascal Mérat (lighting). The vibrant and innovative opera, which premiered at the Mariinsky in 2005, was awarded two Golden Masks (Russian theater's highest award) for best opera and best director, and a Golden Sofit (best opera in St Petersburg). Maratrat's relationship with the Mariinsky Theater continued with a new version of The Love for Three Oranges in 2007 and a 360 degree staging of Mozart’ s Magic Flute (2008), which has been performed more than 150 times at the world-famous opera house.

Throughout his life, Maratrat has explored the relationship between the body and acting. By developing a body that is sensitive, and free, he believes an actor can best transmit the subtlest interior stirrings. From an early age, he practiced gymnastics, judo and contemporary dance. In 1984 Brook sent him to India to study Kalarippayatt and Kathakali and to Taiwan and Hong Kong to learn Chinese martial arts and weaponry (trident, lances, swords, iron balls) in preparation for the company's epic production of the Mahabharata. Maratrat played the role of Vyassa in the French production and coached the other actors in martial arts techniques. To further his understanding, he studied tai chi (with both Lizelle Reymond and her teacher Di Tchao) and kung fu (with Dan Schwartz). He has Practiced Eutonie (with Gerda Alexander), Feldenkrais Method, and Alexander Technique. He has taken work workshops with the Peking Opera (acrobatics and fire juggling), as well as Sumatran dance, Balinese Mask, and Javanese puppet masters. And he has practiced singing with Older Dagar Brothers Aminuddin Daga (Calcutta), as well as musical interpretation with Celibidache and other notable musical conductors. Maratrat regularly shares the results his experience with acting students though master classes, workshops and acting classes, influencing a new generation of actors, singers and dancers around the world.

== Honors and awards ==
Golden Mask

- Best Opera 2006- Il Viaggio a Reims
- Best Opera Director 2006- Alain Maratrat for Il Viaggio a Reims

Golden Sofit

- Best Opera 2006- Il Viaggio a Reims

== Productions ==
Actor (Theater)

- Touchstone in As You Like It (Shakespeare) directed by Daniel Hurstel (2009)
- Trigorine in The Seagull (Chekhov) directed by Philippe Mantha (2004)
- Himself in Trente Ans à Peine (Jean-Claude Carrière) directed by Gabriel Garran (2003)
- Stefano in The Tempest (Shakespeare) directed by Peter Brook (1987)
- Tadada directed by Peter Brook (1986)
- Vyassa in The Mahabharata directed by Peter Brook (1984)
- Lilas Pastia in Carmen (Bizet) directed by Peter Brook (1980)
- Bernard and Lecume in Measure for Measure (Shakespeare) directed by Peter Brook (1979)
- Falcon in The Conference of the Birds directed by Peter Brook (1978)
- Rennee in Dimanche (Michel Deutsch) directed by Dominique Mühler (1975)
- Bougrelas in Ubu Roi (Jarry) directed by Peter Brook (1976)
- Aviator in The Good Soul of Szechuan (Brecht) directed by Alain Mergnat. (1975)
- Timon of Athens (Shakespeare) directed by Peter Brook. (1974)
- Pierrot in Don Juan (Molière) directed by Bernard Sobel. (1974)
- Musician and actor Autocritique (Peter Handke) directed by Gaston Jung (1973)

Actor (Film/Television)

- De Vlaminck in L'Enquête Corse directed by Alain Berberian. (2003)
- Lassagne in Lucie Aubrac directed by Claude Berry (1997)
- Le Deuxième Marin in The Golem directed by Amos Gitaï. (1992)
- Clown in La Petite Bande directed by Michel Deville (1983)
- Claude in De Bien Etranges Affaires (TV) Jean-Claude Lubtchansky 1982
- Bernard Janvier in Salut Champion (TV) Serge Freidman (1981)
- Zug in Guerre en Pays Neutres (TV) Philippe Lefebvre (1981)
- Bernard in Measure for Measure (TV) Peter Brook (1979)
- The Devil in l’Histoire du Soldat (TV) Paul Roland (1973)
- Victor in Victor Ou les Enfants au Pouvoir (TV) directed by Vitrac (1972)

Director (Theater)

- Marie-Stuart (Schiller) in Lyon (2011)
- The Twelfth Night (Shakespeare) in Berlin (2006)
- La Dispute (Marivaux) at the Théâtre Européen de Vidy in Lausanne, Switzerland (2005)
- Peer Gynt (Ibsen) in Geneva & Lausanne, Switzerland (2004)
- Romeo was a Shoe Shiner in the shanty towns of Pretoria, South Africa (1999)
- La Dame aux Camélias with École supérieure de danse de Cannes Rosella Hightower (1998)
- Creation of a new work with the Troup of Piotr Fomenko, Moscow (1996)
- Rencontres (Philippe Braz) Théâtre Jules Vernes (1995)
- Staline (Gaston Salvatore) at the Théâtre National de la Colline, Paris (1994)
- The Three Musketeers (Alexandre Dumas) at the Théâtre de la Main d’Or, Paris (1993)
- Liliom (Ferenc Molnár) Festival de Sant’ Arcangelo, Italy ( 1991- later performed in Bari and Zurich)

Director (Opera)

- The Barber of Seville (Rossini) Mariinsky Theater - St Petersburg, Russia. (2014)
- The Magic Flute (Mozart) Mariinsky Theater & White Nights of St Petersburg, Russia. (2008)
- The Love of Three Oranges (Prokofiev) new version for Mariinsky Theater -Saint Petersburg, Russia (2007) (Moscow, Washington, Tokyo)
- Il viaggio a Reims (Rossini) Mariinsky Theater - St Petersburg, Russia (2005), (Théâtre du Châtelet Paris, Kennedy Center -Washington D.C., Madrid, Tokyo, Baden-Baden., Moscow..) and recorded for TV/DVD
- Háry János (Kodály) at Strasbourg Opera (1998)
- Clear Sky Musique (Guy Reibel -based on Victor Hugo) at Metz Arsenal (1997-1998)
- Falstaff (Salieri) at Théâtre de Tourcoing, Rennes (1996) .(restaged in 2002 in Tourcoing, Rennes, Orleans, Clermont Ferrand...) and recorded for TV/DVD
- Zarzuela, Historia de un Patio at the Festival International (Vienna Austria), at the Festival d'Avignon, and Caen (1992-1993) (throughout the Ile de France 1994, Lille 1996). and recorded for TV/DVD
- Les Trois Souhaits (Martinu) l’Opéra de Lyon (1990)
- Passeport Musical Pour Paris with Mstislav Rostropovitch at Festival d’Evian (1990) (1991 in NY, 1993 Saint Petersburg)
- Les brigands (Jacques Offenbach) l’Opéra de Lyon (1987) and recorded for TV
- L ́étoile (Chabrier) l’Opéra de Lyon (1982) and recorded for TV/DVD
- The Love of Three Oranges (Prokofiev) l’Opéra de Lyon. (1981) (reprised in 1995 in Lyon and San Francisco, 1998 Ravenna Festival, Italy) and recorded for TV/DVD

Director (Variety)

- Régine - Theatre de Bouffes du Nord, Paris. (1994)
- Jacques Higelin - Rex Theater, Paris (1992)

Teaching

- Adjunct Professor Columbia University School of the Arts (2012)
- Workshops in US, Japan, Russia, Germany, France, Italy, Netherlands, Switzerland, Belgium (1975-2013)
- Master Class at University of Venice (IUAV) (2005)
- Taught acting at Paris Conservatory (1999-2000)
- Work with young rap and hip-hop artists from the Metz banlieue (1997-1998)
- Workshop with Rosella Hightower on dance and acting at the École supérieure de danse de Cannes Rosella Hightower with disadvantaged youth from Metz (1998)
- Spent 2 months in the Himalayas training professional and amateur Tibetan and Nepalese actors for their roles in Himalaya by filmmaker Eric Valli. (1997)
- Invited to speak at Festival International of São Paulo (Brazil) by Ruth Escobar, about work with P. Brook- Initiated a research group for 1 year (1996)
- Workshops in prisons, schools, homes for troubled children under the guidance of the Théâtre de Brétigny (Dominique Goudal) (1994-1995)
- Acanthes (Claude Samuel) selection of works of young contemporary composers and their performances in the team of the Festival d'Avignon. (1988)
- Master Class for singers with Jean-Claude Malgoire at the Festival d'Aix-en-Provence (1986)
