= Aubrey Mellor =

Australian theatre director, dramaturge, teacher

Aubrey Mellor OAM
- Education: National Institute of Dramatic Art
- Occupations: Theatre director; dramaturge; teacher
- Awards: Dorothy Crawford Award at the AWGIE Awards(2004); International Theatre Institute Uchimura Prize (2016)

Aubrey Mellor is an Australian theatre director, dramaturge and teacher.

Mellor has also worked as a writer, adapter, set designer, translator, producer, and stage manager.

== Early life and training ==
Brought up around variety and circus, Mellor trained in many fields as a young man. He graduated from a production course at the National Institute of Dramatic Art (NIDA) in Sydney in 1969.

In 1972 Mellor was awarded a Churchill Fellowship. This experience allowed Mellor to study the traditional theatre of the East with a view to incorporating principles observed in Japan where appropriate into the Australian theatre techniques.

== Career ==
Mellor was the Artistic Director of the Jane Street Theatre, which grew out of NIDA.

He was Co-Artistic Director of Nimrod Theatre Company in Sydney for a short time in the early 1980s. He was Artistic Director of the (Royal) Queensland Theatre Company from 1988 to 1993. He was also Artistic Director at Playbox (later renamed Malthouse Theatre) in Melbourne until 2004.

Mellor returned to NIDA as Director in 2005, succeeding John Clark after his nearly forty years in the role. Mellor stayed at NIDA until 2007. He was then Dean of the Performing Arts Schools at Lasalle in Singapore where he designed a new program bringing together the best European and Asian training. He was a Senior Fellow with Lasalle until 2017.

Mellor is a visiting professor to arts colleges in Mongolia, China, Japan, Vietnam, Indonesia and India.

== Awards and honours ==
In 2004 Mellor received an AWGIE (Australian Writers' Guild) special award known as the Dorothy Crawford Award. This prize is awarded for outstanding contribution to the writing profession and industry.

Mellor was the recipient of the International Theatre Institute's Uchimura Prize, for best production at the Tokyo International Festival.

Mellor is listed in the Matilda Awards Hall of Fame for his contribution to the theatre industry in Queensland.

Mellor was awarded an Order of Australia Medal in 1992 for his service to the arts.
