= Ross Skiffington =

Australian magician

- Born: New Zealand
- Education: Auckland University
- Occupations: Magician, actor, director

Ross Skiffington is a New Zealand-born Australian magician, actor, and theatre director, who has received two lifetime achievement awards for his contributions to magic.

== Biography ==
Skiffington trained as an actor, graduating with a Diploma in Fine Arts from Auckland University. He moved to Australia in 1975 and obtained Australian citizenship in 1984. He has performed as an actor on television programs including The Box, Cop Shop, Division 4, The Sullivans, Holiday Island, Carson's Law and Skyways. He has performed as an illusionist on television programs including The Mike Walsh Show, The Don Lane Show, The Ray Martin Show, Young Talent Time, and The Bert Newton Show.

Theatrical and magical shows which Skiffington has created and directed include: Tricks, Electricks, Patrick’s Hat Trick, The Fabulous Fontaines!, Chiller!, CHINOIS!, Silver’s Grand Magic Circus, and the Melbourne Festival of the Arts Opening Night Spectacular. He frequently works with a company of performers, dancers and choreographers whom he has gathered together. His illusions are devised and built by his illusion technician, engineer Gordon Arney.

In addition, Skiffington has worked extensively in theatrical productions, notably with the Bell Shakespeare Company, for which he has worked as both an actor and magician.

Skiffington has frequently worked as a consultant on magic for large-scale theatrical productions. In 2006 he spent six weeks teaching actor Guy Pearce how to perform the tricks of Harry Houdini for the film Death Defying Acts. He worked as a magic consultant for the 2008 production of The Magic Flute by Opera Queensland.

Most recently, Skiffington has been performing regularly at The Magic Mansion.

== Awards ==
Ross Skiffington has received two lifetime achievement awards:

- At the 27th Australian Society of Magicians Convention, for his "contribution to the art of magic" (2000).
- From Magic New Zealand, for "a lifetime dedicated to the magical arts" (2005).

He was also the winner of four awards at the 17th Australian Society of Magicians Convention. These were for 'favourite trick', 'stage', 'comedy' and 'cabaret'.
