= List of Australian films of 1973 =

== 1973 ==
Title	Director	Cast	Genre	Notes
Aches and Snakes	David Deneen	Larry D. Mann	Short / Animation	IMDb
Alvin Purple	Tim Burstall	Graeme Blundell, Abigail, Alan Finney, Penne Hackforth-Jones, George Whaley, Lynette Curran, Dennis Miller, Dina Mann, Jill Forster, Jacki Weaver, Elli Maclure	Comedy	IMDb
And Millions Will Die!	Leslie H. Martinson	Richard Basehart, Susan Strasberg, Leslie Nielsen, Joseph Fürst, Alwyn Kurts, Peter Sumner, Rowena Wallace, Carmen Duncan, Tony Wager, Les Foxcroft, Willie Fennell	Drama / Thriller TV film US Co-production.	
Avengers of the Reef	Chris McCullough	Simon Drake, Noel Ferrier, Garry McDonald, Judy Morris, Tim Elliot, Richard Lupino, Kate Fitzpatrick	Adventure	IMDb
Bulls				IMDb
Castor and Pollux				IMDb
Come Out Fighting	Nigel Buesst			IMDb
Cruisin'				IMDb
Crystal Voyager	Albert Falzon, George Greenough		feature film	
Dalmas	Bert Deling			
Don Quixote	Rudolf Nureyev, Robert Helpmann			IMDb
An Essay on Pornography	Christopher Cary			IMDb
Floating This Time				IMDb
Gretel				IMDb
Libido	David Baker, Tim Burstall, John B. Murray, Fred Schepisi	Judy Morris, Jack Thompson, Robyn Nevin, Jill Forster, Max Gillies, Elke Neidhardt, Bryon Williams, Arthur Dignam, Penne Hackforth-Jones	Drama Feature film	IMDb, AFI winner for Best Film (for the segment "The Child")
Lost in the Bush	Peter Dodds			IMDb
The Man Who Can't Stop				IMDb
Odyssey		Belinda Giblin	TV film / TV Pilot	
One Hundred a Day	Gillian Armstrong	Rosalie Fletcher	Short	IMDb, 8 min.
The Sabbat of the Black Cat	Ralph Marsden	Ralph Lawrence Marsden, David Bingham, Barbara Brighton, Jim Finch, Tracey Tombs	Fantasy / Thriller Feature film	IMDb
Satdee Night				IMDb
Solomon	Tom Jeffrey	Sean Scully, Debbie Baile, Graeme Bassett, Olivia Brown, Tina Bursill, John Ewart, David Gulpilil, Peter Gwynne, Martin Harris, Patricia Leehy	TV film	
Sunshine City	Albie Thoms			
That's Showbiz				IMDb
27A	Esben Storm	Robert McDarra, Bill Hunter, James Kemp, Brian Doyle, Graham Cory, Richard Moir, David Curtis, Bob Maza	Drama Feature film	
The Wicked City	Peter Yeldham	Robin Ramsay, Jill Forster, Abigail, Graham Rouse	TV film / TV Pilot	
Wheels on Fire	Gary Young		Documentary	IMDb

== See also ==
- 1973 in Australia
