= Alvin Purple =

1972 Australian film directed by Tim Burstall

- Theatrical film poster
- Directed by: Tim Burstall
- Written by: Alan Hopgood
- Produced by: Tim Burstall
- Starring: Graeme Blundell; George Whaley; Penne Hackforth-Jones; Abigail; Jacki Weaver
- Cinematography: Robin Copping
- Edited by: Edward McQueen-Mason
- Music by: Brian Cadd
- Production company: Hexagon Productions
- Distributed by: Roadshow Film Distributors
- Release date: 20 December 1973
- Running time: 97 minutes
- Country: Australia
- Language: English
- Budget: A$202,000
- Box office: A$4,720,000

Alvin Purple is a 1973 Australian sex comedy film starring Graeme Blundell in the title role; the screenplay was written by Alan Hopgood and directed by Tim Burstall, through his production company Hexagon Productions and Village Roadshow.

The film received largely negative reviews from local film critics. Despite this, it was a major hit with Australian audiences. Alvin Purple became the most commercially successful Australian film released to that time, breaking the box-office record previously set by Michael Powell's pioneering Anglo-Australian comedy feature They're a Weird Mob (1966), grossing $A4.7 million locally ($49 million in 2022).

== Premise ==
Alvin Purple is a sex-farce which follows the misadventures of a naïve young Melbourne man, Alvin Purple, whom women find irresistible. Working as a door-to-door waterbed salesman, Alvin (unsuccessfully) tries to resist legions of women who want him.

Alvin is so worn-out, he seeks medical help to solve his problems and consults Liz Sort, a female psychiatrist, who recommends him to Dr. McBurney. However, the doctor is a devious charlatan who turns out to be even more sex-obsessed than Alvin, and Alvin ends up in court accused of running a brothel for making blue movies. Alvin ultimately falls in love with Tina, the one girl who does not throw herself at him. She becomes a nun, and Alvin ends up a gardener in the convent's gardens.

== Cast ==
- Graeme Blundell as Alvin Purple
- George Whaley as Dr. McBurney
- Jacki Weaver as Second Sugar Girl
- Penne Hackforth-Jones as Dr. Liz Sort
- Abigail as Girl in See-Through
- Elli Maclure as Tina Donovan
- Noel Ferrier as the Judge
- Jill Forster as Mrs. Horwood
- Lynette Curran as First Sugar Girl
- Christine Amor as Peggy
- Dina Mann as Shirley
- Dennis Miller as Mr. Horwood
- Fred Parslow as Alvin's Father
- Valerie Blake as Alvin's Mother
- Alan Finney as Spike Dooley
- Elke Neidhardt as Woman in Blue Movie
- Gary Down as Roger Hattam
- Peter Aanensen as Ed Cameron
- Jenny Hagen as Agnes Jackson
- Kris McQuade as Samantha
- Shara Berriman as kinky lady
- Stan Monroe as Mrs Warren
- Eileen Chapman as patient
- Jan Friedl as Miss Guernsey
- Barbara Taylor as Mrs Phillips
- Anne Pendlebury as woman with pin
- Boguslawa Alicia Chojnowska
- Danny Webb as newsreader
- Jon Finlayson as Liz's lawyer
- John Smythe as Alvin's lawyer
- Brian Moll as clerk of the court
- Lynne Flanagan as foreman of jury
- Peter Cummins as cab driver
- Sally Conabere as second nun
- Carole Skinner as Mother Superior
- Mercia Deane-Johns as Daisy

== Background ==
Director Tim Burstall had worked extensively in film both locally and internationally in the 1960s, and in the late '60s he was closely involved in the foundation of the famous La Mama Theatre in Melbourne, established by his wife Betty Burstall.

La Mama Theatre was a major focus for the new wave of Australian drama that was emerging at that time, showcasing many new plays, performance pieces and films by people such as Jack Hibberd, Alex Buzo, David Williamson, Bert Deling and Burstall himself.

Burstall's first feature film, 2000 Weeks, was an ambitious contemporary drama about a writer, starring Mark McManus (of Taggart fame) and Jeanie Drynan, which was very notable at the time, being the first all-Australian feature film produced since Charles Chauvel's Jedda in 1954. Although it was reportedly well-received overseas, 2000 Weeks was panned by local critics and it failed disastrously at the box office.

The experience affected Burstall strongly and also influenced other directors and producers, including John B. Murray and Phillip Adams, who observed the hostile reaction to 2000 Weeks and who as a result took their film-making in a more populist direction, as Burstall soon did himself.

Burstall followed this film by a low-budget surfing feature Getting Back to Nothing (1970).

His next film, the contemporary comedy Stork (1971), was much more successful. As well as launching the cinema career of actor Bruce Spence, who played the title role, it was the first of many successful film adaptations of plays by renowned Australian dramatist David Williamson. Stork was adapted from Williamson's play The Coming of Stork, which had premiered at La Mama.

=== Development ===
In 1972, Burstall became a partner in a new film production company, Hexagon Productions. Their first project was meant to be Sittin, based on a script from David Williamson, but Williamson was still lecturing at the time as well as being inundated with other work and was not able to complete it in time; it eventually became Petersen (1974). Burstall then decided to make an Australian version of The Decameron, which was popular in cinemas at the time, and would enable Hexagon to take advantage of the new "R" certificate, which had been introduced to Australia in 1971. Another influence was Bedroom Mazurka.

Burstall considered 26 stories from writers such as Bob Ellis, Williamson, Barry Oakley and Frank Hardy before settling on Alvin Purple written by Alan Hopgood.

Hopgood had enjoyed considerable critical success in the early 1960s with his Aussie rules football satire And the Big Men Fly and he was well-known to TV audiences at the time for his long-running role as the town doctor in the ABC's Bellbird. He originally wrote Alvin Purple for the English company Tigon Films.

Hopgood's story was originally half comic, half serious, and Burstall originally envisioned it as a 20-minute section of a multi story picture. However he then decided to make the story strictly comic and expand it to feature length. Burstall says he rewrote much of Hopgood's script, adding many chases and the water bed sequence, and turning McBurney figure into a sex maniac. The original script played more emphasis on the relationship between Alvin and his virginal girlfriend but this was cut in the final film.

The budget was provided entirely by Hexagon—half from Roadshow, half from Burstall, Bilcock and Copping—apart from a short-term loan from the Australian Film Development Corporation, which was repaid before the film's release. Burstall cast Graeme Blundell in the lead:

I remember Bourkie [Roadshow executive Graham Burke] saying, 'You've got to cast somebody like Jack Thompson'. I said, 'Absolutely not. You've got to cast somebody who wouldn't, on the surface, seem a stud or even particularly attractive'. I actually thought that Alvin wasn't, that the comic element was connected with having a Woody Allen or a Dustin Hoffman figure who is not very obviously sexually attractive, and the girls rushing him. This becomes much funnier than if he was a stud figure.

Blundell was paid A$500 a week (~A$5,200 in 2022, adjusted for inflation) for the role.

=== Production ===
The film was shot over five and a half weeks in March and April 1973.

The score was composed by Brian Cadd who also wrote and performed the theme song.

Lead actor Graeme Bundell was 28 years old at the time of filming but plays a 16-years old schoolboy in some of the initial scenes.

== Reception ==
Alvin Purple was a massive success and took A$4,720,000 at the box office in Australia, which is equivalent to ~A$49 million in 2022 dollars. This was the 7th-highest-grossing Australian film of all time when adjusted for inflation.

Alvin Purple was released in the United States under the title The Sex Therapist.

In 1979, Burstall said the film had returned $2.4 million to the exhibitors, $1.6 million to the distributors, who took $500,000, leaving Hexagon with $1.1 million. It was then sold to television for $40,000 in 1977.

In 2008, Catharine Lumby wrote a book about the film, in the Australian Screen Classics series.

=== Inside Alvin Purple ===
Upon its release, Alvin Purple was accompanied by a 48-minute promotional documentary, Inside Alvin Purple, directed by Brian Trenchard-Smith. This film was pulled from screening, due to censorship concerns, but was accepted after some cuts had been made.

== Sequels and spin-offs ==
The film spawned a 1974 sequel, Alvin Rides Again, which toned down the sex scenes and nudity, and added more camp comedy, and a second follow-up, Melvin, Son of Alvin, in 1984.

There was also a situation comedy TV series of the same title produced by the ABC. It debuted on 19 August 1976.

== Home media ==
Alvin Purple was released on DVD by Umbrella Entertainment in April 2011. The DVD is compatible with region codes 2 and 4 and includes special features such as the theatrical trailer, a picture gallery, the Inside Alvin Purple documentary and interviews with cast, Tim Burstall, Alan Finney, Robin Copping, Graeme Blundell, and Elli Maclure.

Title	Format	Episodes	Discs/Tapes	Region 4 (Australia)	Special features	Distributors
Alvin Purple	DVD	Film	1	7 December 2016	"Inside Alvin Purple" featurette (48 mins) Theatrical trailer Interviews with the director and cast and crew: Tim Burstall, Alan Finney, Robin Copping, Graeme Blundell, Jacki Weaver, and Ellie MacLur (25 mins) Picture gallery	Umbrella Entertainment
