= The Naked Bunyip =

- Directed by: John B. Murray
- Written by: John B. Murray; Ray Taylor; Phillip Adams
- Produced by: John B. Murray; Phillip Adams
- Starring: Graeme Blundell
- Cinematography: Bruce McNaughton
- Edited by: Brian Kavanagh
- Production company: Southern Cross Films
- Distributed by: John B. Murray
- Release date: 12 November 1970
- Running time: 136 minutes
- Country: Australia
- Language: English
- Budget: $35,000

The Naked Bunyip is a 1970 Australian documentary film directed by John B. Murray. The film explores sex in Australia using a fictional framework.

== Synopsis ==
The Naked Bunyip is a sex documentary and a blend of fact and fiction; "[it] incorporates the fictionalizing of the 'real' that had been a feature of tendencies in French 'new wave' and the American avant-garde narrative cinema." Graeme Blundell plays a shy young man whom an ad agency hires to conduct a survey about sex in Australia. The film consists of "unrehearsed and unscripted" interviews as Blundell's character investigates a variety of sexual experiences, all except for the "normal" heterosexual experience.

Among the interviewed are Dame Edna Everage, Jacki Weaver, Aggy Read, Harry M. Miller, and Russell Morris.

== Production ==
Phillip Adams and John Murray decided to make the film after much study of the Australian film industry at the time. They noted the popularity of 16mm travel documentaries shown in public halls in the suburbs and the country. They decided to make a comic film about sex as the most commercial option. Finance was provided almost entirely by tyre dealer Bob Jane, and it was shot on 16mm.

== Release ==
Murray chose to exhibit The Naked Bunyip himself rather than use a distributor, often using his equipment, hiring theatres directly, and handling his publicity. This proved successful, and the movie ran for two years in cinemas.

It led to director Tim Burstall deciding to use a direct approach for his comedy film Stork in 1971. The Naked Bunyip was the stepping stone for Australian film distribution in the 1970s, leading to Australian films' presence at international festivals and the US release of Mad Max in 1979.

=== Censorship controversy ===
The Commonwealth censors insisted on removing five minutes of footage, but the producers refused, simply blacking out the offending images and bleeping the soundtrack. Murray inserted a picture of a bunyip performing a parody of the forbidden action on the black footage. Murray also previewed the film without cuts to censors, angering the censor. This led to a debate about censorship, which led to a reform of censorship standards.
