= 2000 Weeks =

- Directed by: Tim Burstall
- Written by: Tim Burstall; Patrick Ryan
- Produced by: David Bilcock Sr. Patrick Ryan
- Starring: Mark McManus; Jeanie Drynan; Eileen Chapman
- Cinematography: Robin Copping
- Edited by: David Bilcock
- Music by: Don Burrows
- Production companies: Eltham Film Productions; Senior Film Productions
- Distributed by: Columbia Pictures
- Release date: 27 March 1969
- Running time: 90 minutes
- Country: Australia
- Language: English
- Budget: $100,000

2000 Weeks (also known as Two Thousand Weeks) is a 1969 Australian drama film directed by Tim Burstall and starring Mark McManus, Jeanie Drynan, and Eileen Chapman.

== Premise ==
Will, a writer in his thirties, faces a crisis in his life when he has to choose between his wife and mistress. He is also on the fence about choices in his professional life, something that is accentuated when he meets a childhood friend who has become a successful TV producer in England. He calculates he has two thousand weeks left in his life to achieve success.

== Cast ==
- Mark McManus as Will Gardiner
- Jeanie Drynan as Jacky Lewis
- Eileen Chapman as Sarah Gardiner
- David Turnbull as Noel Oakshot
- Michael Duffield as Will's father
- Stephen Dattner as Sir George Turnbull
- Bruce Anderson as Rex Stapleton
- Graeme Blundell as Journalist (uncredited)

== Production ==
Eltham Films was a production company formed by Tim Burstall and Patrick Ryan which had made a number of short films and TV series. They made the film as a co-production with Senior Films, a large production house in Melbourne who specialised in making commercials. Burstall later said that 45% of the budget came from Eltham Films, 45% from Senior Films and 10% from Peter Lord at Victorian Film Laboratories. His idea was to make a film for the international art house market.

Filming started on 2 January 1968 and took eleven weeks with a crew of fourteen.

The film was autobiographical, with "two thousand weeks" being an expression Burstall used in the 1950s.

== Release ==
Burstall secured Columbia Pictures as a distributor and they agreed to split the $10,000 in marketing costs with Eltham Films, but it took them seven months to release it, but Burstall put this down to the reluctance of Australian exhibitors to show local films.

A Two Thousand Weeks ‘photo novel’, illustrated with stills by the film's director of photography, Robin Copping, and official stills photographer Mark Strizic who also designed the book, was published by Sun Books as a movie tie-in in late 1968, alongside a solo jazz album by Don Burrows, commissioned for the movie score. Both book and recording are now rare items.

== Reception ==
The film was poorly received by Australian critics, such as Colin Bennett of The Age, and at Australian film festivals. It received a better critical reception overseas. The experience encouraged Burstall to move in a more commercial direction for the rest of his career. However, he did explore many of the themes from 2000 Weeks again in Petersen (1974).

Burstall later said of the film:

I have a special place in my heart for it, because it was my first feature and in some ways autobiographical. But I wince when I see it, except for the few energy points which are mainly in the flashbacks. I think of the first ten years of my film work, up to and including 2000 Weeks as my apprenticeship... I don't believe the acting in 2000 Weeks is bad so much as a question of actors being asked to say unsayable things, and act unactable things. It was too deficient in energy and too much of it was in an intellectualised form, instead of action.

David Stratton wrote of it:

2,000 Weeks was an important film; important for what it had to say, important in the courage it took to make it in the first place. It deserved a fair go, and it didn't get it. Doubtless Colin Bennett would try to justify his attitude by saying that he judges every film by the same inviolable standard of excellence, and that in the light of this rigid philosophy, 2,000 Weeks was found wanting. Doubtless. But his attitude was unbearable righteous and helped create a climate in which good film could be destroyed. No wonder Burstall never forgave, or forgot. No wonder he never made the mistake of trying to produce a "serious" film again.

The film was also entered into the 6th Moscow International Film Festival.

Paul Byrnes from the NFSA comments: "2000 Weeks was one of the first features of the modern era in Australian cinema, after decades in which almost the only productions were British and American films in search of exotic locales. ... There was an intense desire amongst a few people to restart an Australian film industry, and Burstall was one of the leaders. Indeed, he made nationalist artistic longings the main theme of the film, although it didn't help the film's reception. It was booed when it screened at the 1970 Sydney Film Festival and damned by some influential critics. The box office was poor and Burstall became determined to make films for a wide commercial audience, rather than an art-house few. Many of these later films, starting with Stork (1971) and Alvin Purple (1973), were great popular successes."
