= Sculpture Australia '69 =

- Directed by: Tim Burstall
- Release date: 1969
- Country: Australia
- Language: English

Sculpture Australia '69 is a 1969 Australian TV documentary directed by Tim Burstall.
