= Alvin Purple (TV series) =

- Created by: Alan Hopgood
- Starring: Graeme Blundell; Chris Haywood
- Country of origin: Australia
- No. of episodes: 13

Production
- Running time: 30 min per episode

Original release
- Network: ABC
- Release: 13 August 1976 – 1976

Alvin Purple is an Australian television situation comedy series, made by the ABC in 1976. The series followed continued adventures of the title character, previously featured in the successful sex comedy feature film Alvin Purple (1973) and its sequel Alvin Purple Rides Again (1974). It debuted on 19 August 1976.

Graeme Blundell reprised the role of Alvin in the series. Alvin cohabitated with a new character, flatmate Spike (Chris Haywood). As in the films, various women inexplicably lust after Alvin. The women were played by a stream of recognisable Australian actresses in guest-starring roles including Tina Bursill, Jacki Weaver, Belinda Giblin, June Rich, Jane Harders, Pamela Gibbons, Kirrily Nolan, Peta Toppano, Judy Lynne, Suzanne Church, Carla Hoogeveen, Chantal Contouri, Anya Saleky. Dawn Lake and Leonard Teale also acted in the series.

== Cast ==
=== Main ===
- Graeme Blundell as Alvin
- Chris Haywood as Spike

=== Guests ===
- Angela Punch McGregor as Lucy (1 episode)
- Anya Saleky as Mandy (1 episode)
- Belinda Giblin as Monique (1 episode)
- Briony Behets as Pam (1 episode)
- Chantal Contouri as Christine (1 episode)
- Dawn Lake as Mum (4 episodes)
- Jacki Weaver as Emily
- Jane Harders
- Jeff Ashby as Dr Strange / Harry (2 episodes)
- John Ewart as Bus Driver / Mac / Murray / SOS Temple (4 episodes)
- Judi Farr as Slater (1 episode)
- Jude Kuring as Arlene (1 episode)
- Judy Lynne as Meryl Sugars (1 episode)
- Judy Morris as Sophie (1 episode)
- Kate Sheil as Sally (1 episode)
- Kirrily Nolan as Monica Strange (1 episode)
- Kris McQuade as Elsie (1 episode)
- Leigh Matthews as Max (1 episode)
- Leonard Teale
- Lesley Baker as Myrtle (1 episode)
- Lex Marinos as Bruno (1 episode)
- Lorna Lesley as Orchestra (1 episode)
- Lynette Curran as Fan (1 episode)
- Mercia Deane-Johns as Daisy (1 episode)
- Nigel Lovell as Dad (1 episode)
- Noeline Brown as Iris Temple (1 episode)
- Peta Toppano as Angelica (1 episode)
- Roger Ward as Chicka (1 episode)
- Tina Bursill as Bernice (1 episode)

== Production ==
In late 1974, Tim Burstall and Hexagon Productions discussed, with ABC, a possible television series based on Alvin Purple. Eventually, ABC made the series in arrangement with Alan Hopgood, who wrote the original screenplay.

During negotiations, apparently neither Burstall nor Alan Finney (of Hexagon) made any claim that they retained rights in Alvin. However, after the ABC had produced several episodes, Burstall and Hexagon became aware that property in the Alvin character belonged to them, and they sued the ABC for breach of copyright.

The ABC were going to commence broadcast on 21 July 1975 but agreed to wait until the matter had been resolved in court.

In the decision Hexagon Pty Ltd and Ors v The Australian Broadcasting Commission [1981] VR 224, the court held that copyright vested in Hexagon, but they were stopped from enforcing its rights by not seeking to do so, before the ABC commenced its production. It was held that the conduct of Hexagon had been such as to indicate to the ABC that they would not pursue any rights and prohibit the ABC from proceeding.
