= Duet for Four =

- Directed by: Tim Burstall
- Written by: David Williamson
- Produced by: Tom Burstall; Tim Burstall
- Starring: Mike Preston; Michael Pate; Wendy Hughes; Diane Cilento; Vanessa Leigh; Gary Day
- Cinematography: Dan Burstall
- Edited by: Edward McQueen-Mason
- Production company: Tim Burstall Nominees
- Distributed by: Greater Union
- Release date: 1982
- Running time: 97 minutes
- Country: Australia
- Language: English

Duet for Four is a 1982 film directed by Tim Burstall.

== Plot ==
A 48-year-old man, Ray Martin, faces a series of problems – his wife is dependent on him for money while she supports a younger lover, his mistress is dissatisfied and he is vying to secure a distribution deal with US interests to take his toy business to a new level.

== Cast ==
- Mike Preston as Ray Martin
- Wendy Hughes as Barbara Dunstan
- Michael Pate as Al Geisman
- Diane Cilento as Margot Martin
- Gary Day as Terry Byrne
- Vanessa Leigh as Dianne Sanders
- Warwick Comber as Cliff Ingersoll
- Sigrid Thornton as Carline Martin
- Rod Mullinar as Ken Overland
- Clare Binney as Jacki Nesbitt

== Production ==
The script by David Williamson was originally commissioned by Hexagon Productions in the wake of the success of Petersen. Tim Burstall asked Williamson to write a script on a mid-life crisis even though he was in his early thirties at the time. Williamson wrote the script in eight days under the title The Toy Man; Jack Thompson was originally considered for the main role, but Hexagon decided not to make it.

In the 1980s Williamson's reputation remained high and Burstall decided to proceed with the film. Burstall said:

I was going through a mid-life crisis of some sort and thought – 'What is the nature of work? Have I wasted my time? Am I doing the right thing?' That sort of thing. And toys was the industry we decided to use because it was being taken over by the Yanks. It was a sort of image of what was happening in film at the time. I don't think the picture works very well.

The title during shooting was Partners (the title of the finished film is perplexing as there are more than four prominent characters). The film was shot in Melbourne (Heide II, La Trobe University, Nicholson Street Carlton and Prince Henry's Hospital provide locations) and Queenscliff. According to David Stratton's The Avocado Plantation, the movie features some in-jokes about the Australian film industry of the early 1970s.

Finance was partly provided by the Australian Film Commission and Victorian Film Corporation.

Wendy Hughes later described making the film as "one of my most enjoyable experiences" but thought "the role I was playing... seemed more a part of the early 1970s, when in fact it was written".

Between the writing of the script and the film's production the television presenter Ray Martin became prominent as part of the Australian 60 Minutes. That the main character in Duet for Four has the same name as a well-known media figure is not acknowledged in the film.
