= Paul M. Layton =

Australian actor

Paul Michael Layton (born 8 November 1986) is an Australian actor, writer, producer and director. He is known for his lead role in seasons 3–8 of The Horizon, in which he played Jake.

== Background ==
Paul Michael Layton was born in Sydney, Australia, on 8 November 1986. He studied at The Australian Academy of Dramatic Arts.

== Career ==
Layton started out in theatre, with many of his performances being in roles at the Pilgrim Theatre in Sydney. He later moved into TV and film, with roles in short films, like My Thoughts Exactly, and various TV series. In 2013, he was cast in the lead role of popular web series, The Horizon, and performed alongside David Collins (Umbilical Brothers) in The Detectives of Noir Town.

In more recent years, Layton took on the role of writer and producer in 25 Frames and The Detectives of Noir Town, winning an award for The Detectives of Noir Town at the Connect Film Festival AUS in 2015. Layton began his directing career in 2018 with The Oxford Circus, which he also produced and starred in.

== Filmography ==
=== Actor ===
Year	Title	Role	Notes
2007	My Mediator	Peter	Short film
2009	Two of a Kind	Charlie	Video short
2010	The Gift of the Gun	Ben	Short film
2010	25 Frames		TV series
2011	Panic at Rock Island	Davern	TV movie
2011	Story Keeper	Davern	
2013	My Thoughts Exactly	Mark	Short film
2013–2016	The Horizon	Jake	Web series
2014	Two Brothers and a Girl	Ben Harris	
2014	The Detectives of Noir Town	Detective Hugh Mann	Short film
2015	Endless Highway	Ira	Short film
2016	Horizon	Jake	TV movie
2017	Dream Channel	Tan Man	TV series
2018	The Oxford Circus	Francois Dahlvinyer Von Vundakint	TV movie

=== Producer and Writer ===
Year	Title	Role	Notes
2010	25 Frames	Producer, writer	14 episodes
2014	The Detectives of Noir Town	Co-producer, co-writer	
2018	The Oxford Circus	Executive producer/producer, writer	

=== Director ===
Year	Title	Role	Notes
2018	The Oxford Circus	Director	

=== Awards and nominations ===
Year	Award	Category	Work	Result	Ref.
2015	Connect Film Festival, AUS	Straight to the Poolroom Award: Best Aussie Comedy	The Detectives of Noir Town	Won	
