= Mark McManus =

Scottish actor (1935–1994)

- Born: 21 February 1935; Hamilton, Lanarkshire, Scotland
- Died: 6 June 1994 (aged 59); Glasgow, Scotland
- Occupation: Actor
- Years active: 1967–1994

Mark McManus (21 February 1935 – 6 June 1994) was a Scottish actor known for his roles in the British television series Sam, Bulman, The Brothers, Strangers, and Dramarama, and the feature film 2000 Weeks. He was best known for playing the tough Glaswegian Detective Chief Inspector Jim Taggart in the long-running STV television series Taggart from 1983 until his death in 1994.

== Career ==
McManus was born in Hamilton, Scotland, and moved to Hillingdon in London, England when he was three years old, until he moved again at the age of 16 to Australia, where he performed in amateur theatre groups that led him to becoming a professional actor. He appeared in the children's TV series Skippy the Bush Kangaroo and had a guest appearance in the long-running Australian police drama Homicide. He also starred in Tim Burstall's feature film 2000 Weeks (1969), which was the first full-length Australian-produced feature made in Australia since Charles Chauvel's Jedda in 1954.

McManus also appeared in the American-produced historical drama Adam's Woman and co-starred with Mick Jagger in the Tony Richardson film version of the Ned Kelly story, Ned Kelly (both 1970).

McManus returned to the UK in 1971, and was known to a wider audience when he played roles such as Harry Carter in The Brothers and Sam Wilson, a coal miner in the 1973 TV series Sam. McManus appeared opposite Peter O'Toole in the 1976 TV movie Rogue Male, and starred as a dour Scots police officer, Jack Lambie, in Strangers, a role he reprised as a guest star in the spin-off, Bulman. McManus also had roles in productions at the National Theatre and the Royal Court Theatre.

In July 1986, McManus appeared in the BBC Scotland television play Four to One, written by Gawn Grainger, The play also featured Trevor Ray, Derek Newark and Derrick O'Connor, and was produced by Norman McCandlish.

McManus was also a boxer before he moved into acting. He is not to be confused with the boxer of the same name (born 1974) from Basildon in England.

=== Taggart ===
McManus began playing the title character in the crime drama Taggart in September 1983, alongside Neil Duncan, Tom Watson and Robert Robertson. The pilot attracted an estimated 7.6 million viewers. When Duncan left the show in 1987, James MacPherson joined as new character Michael Jardine, immediately promoted to replace Duncan's character as detective sergeant. This was preceded by the arrival of a new superintendent, Jack McVitie, in the 1985 episode "Murder in Season". A new female detective constable, Jackie Reid (portrayed by Blythe Duff), was introduced in 1990 and, in "Secrets" (1994), Taggart promoted her to detective sergeant.

== Death ==
McManus drank heavily and, after several years of declining health, died from an alcohol-related illness. He was hospitalised with severe jaundice in May 1994 and died in Glasgow of pneumonia brought on by liver failure on 6 June 1994, aged 59, eight months after the death of his second wife Marion. In the last two years of his life, McManus had also lost his mother, his brother and his two sisters. The actor was the first person to be posthumously awarded the Lord Provost of Glasgow's Award for Performing Arts.

McManus's final Taggart episode was "Hellfire" (series 11, episode 1). After his death, his character was given an on-air funeral in the final episode of the 11th series, "Black Orchid".

== Filmography ==
=== Film ===
Year	Title	Role
1969	2000 Weeks	Will Gardiner
1970	Adam's Woman	Nobby
1970	Ned Kelly	Joe Byrne

=== Television ===
Year	Title	Role	Notes
1963	Prelude to Harvest	Seaman	TV movie
1963	Ballad for One Gun	Dan Kelly	TV movie
1963	Concord of Sweet Sounds	Bill	TV movie
1964	The One That Got Away		TV movie
1966	Homicide	+++++++++++++++++++++++++++++++++++++++++++++++++++++++++++++	Episode: "Holiday Affair"
1966	Wednesday Theatre	+++++++++++++++++++++++++++++++++++++++++++++++++++++++++++++	Episode: Twelfth Night
1966	The Man Who Saw It	+++++++++++++++++++++++++++++++++++++++++++++++++++++++++++++	TV movie
1966–1967	Wandjina!	+++++++++++++++++++++++++++++++++++++++++++++++++++++++++++++	2 episodes
1967	Skippy the Bush Kangaroo	+++++++++++++++++++++++++++++++++++++++++++++++++++++++++++++	Episode: "The Rustlers"
1968	The Battlers	+++++++++++++++++++++++++++++++++++++++++++++++++++++++++++++	Season 1, 5 episodes
1969	Australian Plays	+++++++++++++++++++++++++++++++++++++++++++++++++++++++++++++	Episode: "Dynasty"
1969	The Rovers	Jack Webster	Episode: "U.F.O. Pacific"
1970	Shadows of Fear	Cox	Episode: "Did You Lock Up?"
1970	Dr. Finlay's Casebook	Eric Calder	Episode: "A Good Prospect"
1971	Man at the Top	Dennis Rosslea	Series 1, 2 episodes
1971	Thirty-Minute Theatre		Episode: "Combing Down His Yellow Hair"
1972	Stage 2		Episode: "Peer Gynt"
1972	Colditz	Lt Cameron	Episode: "The Undefeated"
1972	Pathfinders	Flight Sergeant Joe Carson	Episode: "Jonah Man"
1972	Crown Court	Harry Bryant	Serial: "R v Bryant"
1973	The Brothers	Harry Carter	Season 2
1974	The Stars Look Down		Miniseries
1975	2nd House	Actor in Knots	Episode: "Toback's Gambler"
1974–1975	Sam	Sam Wilson	Series 2-3
1976	Benny Lynch	Benny Lynch	TV movie
1976	Rogue Male	Vaner	TV movie
1976	Jackanory	Storyteller	Episode: "The Nargun and the Stars"
1978	The Foundation	Bill Wood	Series 2
1978	Target	Wilson	Episode: "The Macramé Man"
1979	Brecht and Co	Member of Brecht's company / Galy Gay / Wang	TV movie
1980	Bull Week	Johnny Kowal	Miniseries
1980–1982	Strangers	Detective Chief Superintendent Jack Lambie	Series 3-5
1981	The Long and the Short and the Tall	Sergeant Mitchem	TV movie
1982	Union Castle	Charles Winzer	Series 1, episode 3
1983	Gunfight at the Joe Kaye Corral	Archie	TV movie
1983	Killer	Detective Chief Inspector Jim Taggart	Miniseries
1983–1995	Taggart	Detective Chief Inspector Jim Taggart	Series 1-11, 28 episodes
1985	Bulman	Detective Chief Superintendent Jack Lambie	3 episodes
1986	Four to One	David	TV movie
1987	Scotch and Wry	Detective Chief Inspector Jim Taggart	Guest appearance
1988	Dramarama	Bobby Soutar	Episode: "The Macramé Man"
1988	Minder	Dixon	Episode: "An Officer and a Car Salesman"

== Sources ==
- No Matter What They Say - The Story of Sweet (HomeSweetHome Publishing, 2009).
