= Do I Have to Kill My Child? =

1976 television film directed by Donald Crombie

- Directed by: Donald Crombie
- Starring: Jacki Weaver
- Country of origin: Australia
- Original language: English

Production
- Producer: Anne Deveson
- Running time: 53 minutes

Original release
- Network: Nine Network
- Release: 1976

Do I Have to Kill My Child? is a 1976 Australian film

== Plot ==
A young mother, Diane, questions in hindsight her choice to have another child. Out of emotional distress and frustration she begins to physically abuse her baby.

== Cast ==
- Jacki Weaver as Dianne
- Brendon Lunney as Ross
- Betty Lucas as Florence
- Michelle Jarman as Tracey
- Jeremy Letts as Jamie
- Cecily Polson as Susan
- Ray Meagher as Des
- Willie Fennell as Rob
- Melissa Jaffer as Mrs Hammond
- John Orcsik as Fang
- Henri Szeps as Doctor
- Lorna Lesley as Tricia

== Production ==
Donald Crombie and Anne Deveson had worked together on Who Killed Jenny Langby?. Crombie says Deveson came up with the idea "because she had a personal interest in child abuse, baby-bashing we should call it, as opposed to sexual abuse... I think with her third child she had felt the impulse to injure the child. She was a young mother with three kids and it was all too much. So being Anne Deveson, she started to explore and discovered there was this hidden syndrome in society. The research that Anne did was quite extraordinary: women admitting that they would literally lock themselves in a room to stop them getting to the kid. Pretty horrific stuff."

Anne Deveson said, "As a child Dianne was emotionally damaged, constantly criticized and frustrated, made to feel inadequate and insecure. She longs for society's and her mother's approval, tries too hard to be perfect. She gets by pretty well until a combination of stresses makes her erupt into violence against her third child."

Finance was obtained from Film Australia and the Nine Network.

The Women's Film Fund invested $25,000. The program was sold for $37,000. (Another account says the film was sold for $48,000.)

== Reception ==
The film was a ratings success. Crombie said, "I think it rated 40 in Sydney and something similar in Melbourne. It did numbers you only get with Test Matches and one-off big sporting events today! Anne received hugee mail from that one film. She said the people rang in and wrote that they thought they were unique, that they were monsters, and then they realised. So that was an extraordinarily satisfying experience. It really worked."

== Awards ==
Jackie Weaver's performance earned her Best Actress at the Logies.
