= Crosstalk (film) =

- Film poster
- Directed by: Mark Egerton
- Written by: Mark Egerton; Linda Lane
- Produced by: Errol Sullivan
- Starring: Gary Day; Penny Downie; John Ewart
- Cinematography: Vincent Morton
- Edited by: Colin Waddy
- Music by: Chris Neal
- Production companies: Wall to Wall Ltd; NSW Film Corporation
- Release date: 1982
- Running time: 83 minutes
- Country: Australia
- Language: English
- Budget: A$1.2 million
- Box office: A$26,000 (Australia)

Crosstalk is a 1982 science fiction thriller film made in Australia and produced by the New South Wales Film Corporation. Directed by Mark Egerton and starring Gary Day, the film's story bears a resemblance to Rear Window.

== Plot ==
Ed Ballinger is an engineer who uses a wheelchair and is developing a computer system with artificial intelligence called the I-500. After moving into an apartment complex, Ed thinks he witnessed a murder in a neighbouring building.

== Cast ==
- Gary Day as Ballinger
- Penny Downie as Cindy
- John Ewart as David Stollier
- Kim Deacon as Jane
- Peter Collingwood as Hollister
- Brian McDermott as Whitehead
- Jill Forster as Mrs. Stollier
- Judith Woodroofe as Clair

== Reception ==
Filmink magazine said "It’s a film best remembered for the fact that the director was sacked during production."

The Bulletin said the parallels to Rear Window were "both brave and foolish which, for a while, shows signs of coming off. Vincent Monton’s glossy photography and the assurance with which director Mark Egerton frames each shot make Crosstalk a film of great visual flair. Its looks are consistently interesting; its story and performances, sadly, are not."

=== Box office ===
Crosstalk grossed $26,000 at the box office in Australia.

== Home media ==
Title	Format	Ep #	Discs	Release date	Special features	Distributors
Crosstalk	DVD	Film	01	8 July 2020	TBA	Umbrella Entertainment

== See also ==
- Cinema of Australia
