= Lorna Lesley =

Australian actress (born 1959)

Lorna Lesley (born 1956, in Kent) is an Australian actress, who has worked extensively in theatre, film and TV during the 1970s, 1980s and 1990s period.

In 2018 Lesley received a Gold Medal from the Media, Entertainment and Arts Alliance for "significant contribution to the union".

== Filmography ==
=== Film ===
| Year | Title | Role | Type |
|---|---|---|---|
| 1976 | Caddie | Maudie's Friend 1 (as Lorna Leslie) | Feature film |
| 1976 | Do I Have to Kill My Child? | Tricia | TV film |
| 1976 | Double Dealer | | TV film |
| 1978 | Newsfront | Ellie | Feature film |
| 1978 | Little Boy Lost | Dorrie Walls | Feature film |
| 1979 | Just Out of Reach | Cathy | Feature film |
| 1980 | The Chain Reaction | Gloria | Feature film |
| 1980 | ...Maybe This Time | Suzy Williams | Feature film |
| 1981 | The Survivor | Susan | Feature film |
| 1982 | The Little Feller | Wendy Blair | TV film |
| 1983 | Stanley | Sheryl Benton | Feature film |
| 1984 | The Settlement | Joycie | Feature film |
| 1986 | The Movers | Tara | TV film |
| 1988 | Touch the Sun: Princess Kate | Glenys Mathieson | TV film |
| 1992 | Resistance | Jean Skilling | Feature film |
| 1998 | Aftershocks | Lyn Brown | TV film |
| 2001 | The Diamond of Jeru | Jenny Vandover | TV film |
| 2002 | Rabbit-Proof Fence | Miss Thomas (as Lorna Leslie) | Feature film |
| 2008 | Infamous Victory: Ben Chifley's Battle for Coal | Phyllis Donnelly | TV film |
| 2012 | The Mind Job | Dr. Neasley | Film short |
| 2014 | Cavity | Elaine Jones | Film short |
| 2018 | Swan Song | Rose | Film short |

=== Television ===
| Year | Title | Role | Type |
|---|---|---|---|
| 1975 | Two-Way Mirror | Recurring role: Olivia | TV pilot |
| 1976 | Alvin Purple | Guest role: Orchestra (as Lorna Leslie) | TV series, 1 episode |
| 1976 | King’s Men | Guest role: The Stripper | TV series, 1 episode |
| 1976 | Number 96 | Recurring guest role: Emma Robinson | TV series, 2 episodes |
| 1977 | The Outsiders | Guest role: Candy | TV series, 1 episode |
| 1977 | Benny Hill Down Under | Lucy Jardine / Various Characters | TV special |
| 1977 | Glenview High | Guest role: Sally | TV series, 1 episode |
| 1978 | Chopper Squad | Guest role: Gail | TV series, 1 episode |
| 1978; 1981 | Cop Shop | Guest roles: Cynthia Rees / Julie Stephens | TV series, 4 episodes |
| 1978 | Case for the Defence | Guest role: The Receptionist | TV series, 1 episode |
| 1979 | Doctor Down Under | Guest role: Nurse Pettigrew | TV series, 1 episode |
| 1979 | Skyways | Recurring guest role: Pippa Shaw | TV series, 2 episodes |
| 1979 | Ride on Stranger | Recurring role: Olivia Asche | TV miniseries, 1 episode |
| 1980; 1981 | Kingswood Country | Guest roles: Maxine / Cheryl | TV series, 2 episodes |
| 1980 | Water Under the Bridge | Nurse | TV miniseries, 1 episode |
| 1981 | A Town Like Alice | Recurring role: Rose Sawyer | TV miniseries, 2 episodes |
| 1981 | Menotti | Guest role | TV series, 1 episode |
| 1981-85 | A Country Practice | Guest roles: Louise Blair / Janet Dawson / Ruth 'Willow' Carmody (as Lorna Leslie) | TV series, 6 episodes |
| 1984 | Special Squad | Guest role: Sharon | TV series, 1 episode |
| 1984 | Carson's Law | Guest role: Maureen | TV series, 2 episodes |
| 1985 | Colour in the Creek | Regular role: Ethel | TV miniseries, 8 episodes |
| 1986 | The Flying Doctors | Guest role: Janice Robinson | TV series, 1 episode |
| 1987 | The Shiralee | Support role: Marge | TV miniseries, 2 episodes |
| 1988 | Mike Willesee's Australians | Lead role: Mary MacKillop | TV film series, episode 4: "Mary MacKillop" |
| 1989 | The Heroes | Recurring role: Pat Carse | TV miniseries, 2 episodes |
| 1990 | Rafferty's Rules | Guest role: Connie Apps | TV series, 1 episode |
| 1993 | G.P. | Guest role: Anna Gordon | TV series, 1 episode |
| 1995 | At Home | Guest | TV series, 1 episode |
| 1998 | Children's Hospital | Guest role: Glenda Reynolds | TV series, 1 episode |
| 1998 | Water Rats | Guest role: Mrs. Gleeson | TV series, 1 episode |
| 2003 | White Collar Blue | Guest role: Dr. Rebecca Howell (as Lorna Leslie) | TV series, 1 episode |
| 2012 | A Moody Christmas | Guest role: Cora's Mum | TV miniseries, 1 episode |
| 2017 | House of Bond | Recurring role: Mrs. Hughes | TV miniseries, 2 episodes |
