= Francis Mossman =

New Zealand actor and model (1988–2021)

- Born: Francis Anthony Mossman; 14 April 1988; Auckland, New Zealand
- Died: 14 August 2021 (aged 33); Sydney, New South Wales, Australia
- Occupation: Actor
- Years active: 2007–2021
- Known for: Spartacus: Vengeance; The Horizon
- Height: 1.77 m (5 ft 10 in)

Francis Anthony Mossman (14 April 1988 – 14 August 2021) was a New Zealand actor based in Australia. He was best known for his portrayal of Stevie Hughes in The Horizon and Vitus in Spartacus: Vengeance.

== Biography ==
Francis Mossman was born on 14 April 1988, in Auckland, New Zealand, to Reginald Mossman and Maria Abad. He had two brothers. In 2012, Mossman migrated to Sydney, Australia.

Mossman died on 14 August 2021, at the age of 33.

== Career ==
Mossman appeared in the New Zealand kids' series Amazing Extraordinary Friends, and the New Zealand soap Shortland Street. He also appeared in three episodes of Starz series Spartacus: Vengeance.

Mossman starred as Stevie Hughes in The Horizon. He reprised his role as Stevie in the television movie The Horizon, directed by Stephan Elliott. Mossman also featured in the Australian feature film Ruben Guthrie.

== Personal life ==
Mossman was confirmed to be gay and had a partner named Lachlan before he died.

== Filmography ==
=== Television ===
- Shortland Street (2006) – Taylor
- Amazing Extraordinary Friends (2006) – Nigel
- Spartacus: Vengeance (2012) – Vitus
- The Horizon (2013 - 2017) – Stevie Hughes

=== Films ===
- Ruben Guthrie (2015) – Lorenzo Oil
- Pig Boy (2017) (short) – Dylan
- Dis-Connect (2020) (short) – Luke
