= The Horizon (web series) =

Australian web series with LGBT characters

- Created by: Adam Jones; Boaz Stark
- Directed by: Boaz Stark
- Starring: Francis Mossman; Jai Rodriguez; Belinda Giblin; Indigo Felton; Patrick James; Paul M Layton; Sarah Louella; Adam George; Matthew C Clarke
- Theme music composer: Guy Gross (since Season 2)
- Country of origin: Australia
- Original language: English
- No. of seasons: 8
- No. of episodes: 64

Production
- Executive producers: Tim Duggan (1st Season); Boaz Stark (Seasons 2, 3 & 4)
- Producers: Brian Cobb (Seasons 2, 3 & 4) Adam Jones (Digital Producer - 1st Season)
- Production locations: Sydney, Australia
- Editor: Kel Gronow
- Running time: 6–11 minutes

Original release
- Release: 8 November 2009 – November 9, 2017

The Horizon is a web series which premiered on YouTube. It was the most-watched online series made in Australia, and the most-watched LGBT web series in the world.

The Horizon was created by Adam Jones and Boaz Stark. Season 1 was written in 2009 by Stark (writer for Sons and Daughters, Neighbours, Always Greener and Packed to the Rafters). Season 1 was produced by Ure and Christian Taylor and directed by Stark and Ure. Seasons 2, 3 and 4 were written and directed by Stark and produced by Brian Cobb and his company Cobbstar Productions.

The Horizon is made in partnership with the Aids Council of New South Wales (ACON). The budget for the first series was A$3,000, but it went viral and later seasons had significantly higher production values. In March 2018 it stood at over 63,000,000 views, and was growing by 80,000 views. As of August 2021 it was the most successful online series made in Australia.

Season 1 starred Patrick James, Jay Duncan, Andrew Perry and Samuel Rodriguez. Season 2 starred Alistair Cooke, Patrick James, Indigo Felton, Sam David Harris, Adam George and Rebecca Sunshine. Seasons 3 and 4 starred Patrick James, Indigo Felton, Paul Layton, Adam George, Sarah Louella, Matthew C Clarke and Francis Mossman.

"Low budget productions can be a challenge – every penny counts when creating a production such as The Horizon. But it also has its advantages, such as becoming a family and having an amazing cast and crew that you learn to trust and work so well with", explained actor Alistair Cooke (who took over the role of Jake in Season 2).

The third series was promoted by DNA magazine. Sponsors included the Aids Council of NSW (ACON), Glyde Health, Ben Sherman, AussieBum, House of Priscilla, The Oxford Hotel, DNA magazine, General Pants Co and Marrickville Council.

Stephan Elliott, who directed Priscilla Queen of the Desert, mentored Stark in season three.

The Horizon won 4 awards at the L.A. Webfest 2014: Outstanding Series, Outstanding Writing, Outstanding Actor - Indigo Felton and Outstanding Actor - Alistair Cooke

== Production ==
The first series was filmed on location in Sydney at the Colombian Hotel, Syl's Bed and Breakfast and Kika Tapas Bar.

== Characters ==
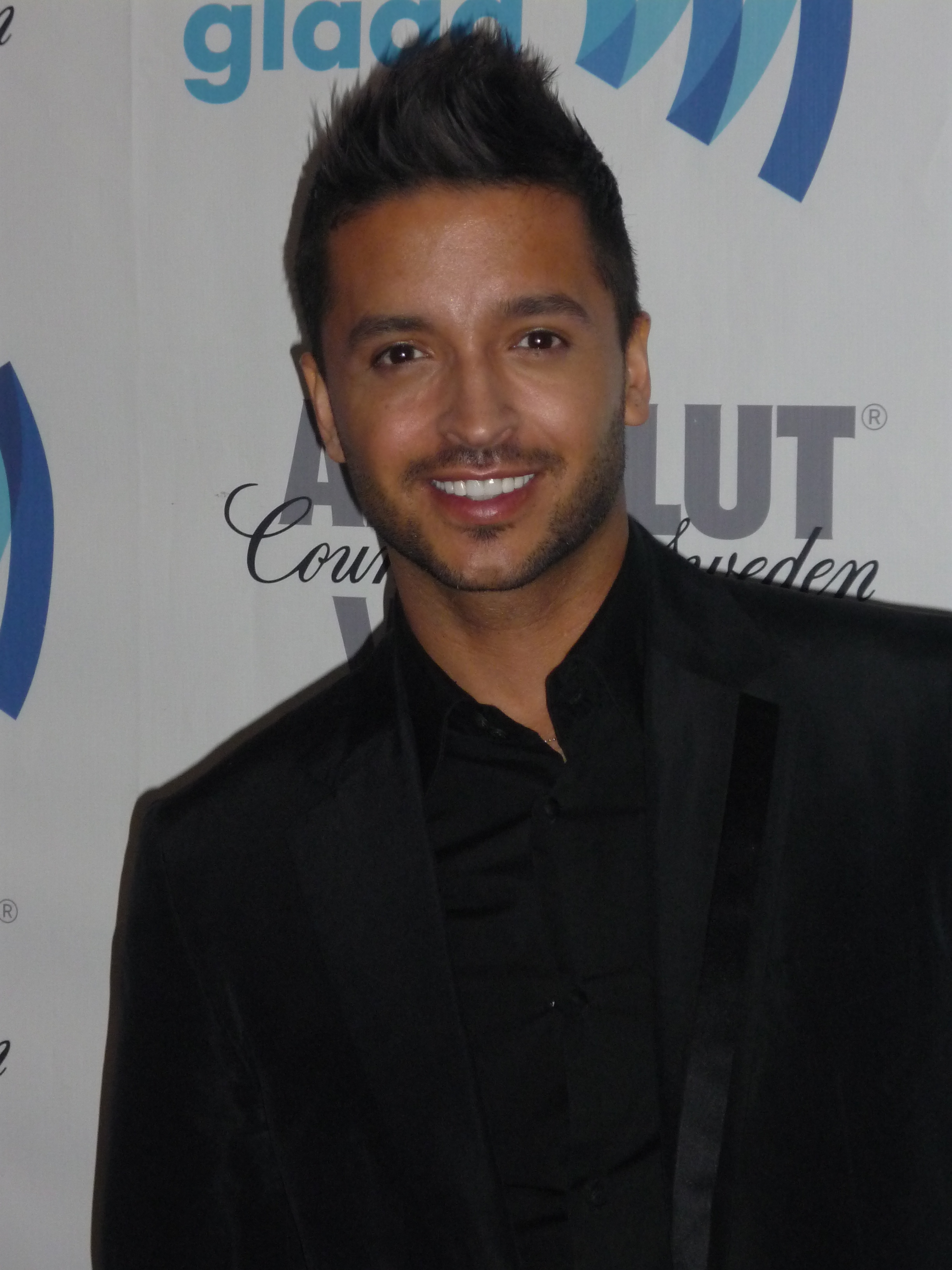
Jai Rodriguez portrays Ritchie.

- Jake (Paul Layton (Seasons 3 - 8); Alistair Cooke (Season 2); Andrew Perry (Season 1)) Nicknamed by Wilma 'Bega' (the town where he is originally from Bega, New South Wales)
- AJ (Indigo Felton (Seasons 2 - 8); Jay Duncan (Season 1))
- Wilma Bumhurt/Dennis (Patrick James (Seasons 1 - 8)) Favourite saying - "You wanna fuck me, don't you"
- Micky Rose (Matthew C Clarke (Seasons 3 - 8); Sam David Harris (Season 2))
- Millie (Sarah Louella (Seasons 3 - 7); Rebecca Sunshine (Season 2); Anna Bauert (special episode))
- Saxon (Adam George (Seasons 2 - 8))
- Stevie Hughes (Francis Mossman (guest in Seasons 3 - 4; main in Seasons 5 - 8))
- Ritchie Valentine (Jai Rodriguez (Seasons 5 - 6))
- Tyson Alexander (Daniel Needs) (guest in season 6; main in Season 8))
- Chris (Sammy Rodriguez (Season 1))

== Episodes ==
=== Season 1 ===
Jake, an 18-year-old innocent from Bega, comes to the city to meet 28-year-old AJ after months of chatting on a gay social networking website. Things turn pear-shaped when AJ is exposed as a love-rat and Jake sleeps with AJ's housemate and ex-lover Chris in ecstasy-fuelled retaliation. Despite the debacle, Jake decides to stay in the city with the support of caustic drag queen, new friend and flatmate, Wilma Bumhurt.

It was also supported by Manhunt and www.samesame.com.au
Episode 1 - 8 - Uploaded between 8 November 2009 - 28 Dec 2009
Guest Stars - Chris (Sammy Rodriguez)
Note; Boaz was in the background in the bar in the 1st episode.

=== Season 2 ===
Jake and AJ miss each other deeply, although Jake expresses it by being wary of getting involved with other guys while AJ sleeps with as many men as humanly possible. A chance meeting on the street has AJ admitting how much he misses Jake. Both are willing to put the past behind them and start again as friends. But when they do get together again in AJ's new apartment, within seconds they're kissing and end up sleeping together. After sex they decide to give the relationship another chance, after AJ swears he'll be faithful. It's smooth sailing until two of Jake's old school friends arrive from Bega, Micky and Millie. They're a couple, although fun-loving Millie has no idea Micky and Jake have "fooled around" back home. Privately, Micky is struggling with his sexuality and a chance encounter in a stairwell with a stranger (AJ) leads to sex. Although, mortified he's cheated on Jake, AJ and Micky get together again – only this time they're caught red-handed by Jake. Micky makes his escape, leaving a deeply sorry AJ to tearfully explain how he can separate his feelings of love for Jake from any little indiscretions. But Jake is crushed and breaks off their relationship again. Meanwhile, Micky steals money from Wilma and disappears, leaving Jake and Wilma to explain all to a shell-shocked Millie.

Meanwhile, Wilma is emotionally torn after getting a voicemail message from her father, having not spoken to either of her parents in over ten years. Ardent Christians, they rejected their son when Wilma (then Dennis) came out to them as gay. Wilma was hurt, having been close to her father as a child. She has fond memories of him teaching her "Ave Maria" to perform in the church choir, which she has on video. Her parents have no idea their son is now a drag queen. Wilma tries calling her father back and gets his voicemail. The next day she gets the news that her father has died and realises he may have been calling to make peace before he died. Wilma, out of drag, goes to see her grieving mother, only to be told not to attend the funeral. Deeply wounded, Wilma stays away - but later puts on a private show in full drag at the cemetery, performing a pumped up house version of "Ave Maria" at her father's grave with only Jake and Millie to witness it. The passionate performance goes a long way in helping them all feel better about life and love.

Co-sponsored by www.glydehealth.com (a sexual health company)
Episodes 9 - 16 - Uploaded between 19 December 2012 – 31 January 2013
Guest Stars

- Craig - Matt Hyde
- Wilma's Father - Nick Day
- Young Wilma - Vincent Day
- Wilma's Mum 'Yvonne'- Belinda Giblin

=== Season 3 ===
AJ embarks on an open relationship with Saxon, but both find the politics are far more complicated than they’d anticipated when Saxon chooses "trade" over AJ one night. Wounded, AJ pushes Saxon away and then refuses to accept his genuine apology. Saxon finally accuses AJ of sabotaging their relationship, as he does with everyone. Confronted by this truth, AJ forgives him and the two get back on good footing.

After being rejected by her mother for the second time, Wilma would happily never see her again - but when her drink gets spiked in a club, she passes out in an alley, hits her head and ends up in hospital. Yvonne comes to see her but has second thoughts and retreats. When Wilma has recovered, she goes (as Dennis) to see Yvonne and find out exactly what she wants. Yvonne breaks down; she isn't sure; she's just so lonely since her husband died. Dennis thaws in the face of Yvonne's distress and agrees to spend some time with her – only the next time they meet, Wilma makes a point of coming in drag. Yvonne baulks but Wilma insists she accepts her on her terms.

Jake, Millie and Wilma discover Micky is working as a gay rent boy to survive and bring him back into the fold. Before long, Jake and Micky are sleeping together and Micky admits he's always loved Jake but was too closeted to admit it. The two bond and Micky is soon lobbying to have unprotected sex. Jake suggests they both go for HIV tests first. Whilst Jake sits in the testing centre waiting area for his results, Micky is with a Peer Educator getting his HIV tests results – which have come back positive...

(Episodes 17 - 24) Uploaded between 7 November 2013 and this season each episode was sponsored by a different company. Belinda Giblin also reprises her role as Wilma's mother throughout the season.

- Episode 17 - sponsored by ACON, Boaz appears as one of the many bedmates of A.J.
- Episode 18 - sponsored by Glydeheath, Guest stars - Francis Mossman as Stevie, Johnnie Cass as Ben and Tim Roberts as 'Drag Hag'
- Episode 19 - sponsored by www.bensherman.com.au, Guest stars - Francis Mossman as Stevie, Johnnie Cass as Ben and Tim Roberts as 'Drag Hag'
- Episode 20 - sponsored by www.aussiebum.com, Guest Stars - Gretel Killeen as 'Nurse Angela Mercie', Barry Quin as 'Phil', David Wheeler as Norm.
- Episode 21 - sponsored by www.generalpants.com.au, Guest stars - Gretel Killeen as Angela Mercie, Barry Quin as Phil, David Wheeler as Norm, Celeste as 'Coco Verdose', Felicity Frockaccino as 'Betty Pukes' and Fevsi Musa as 'Nora Bigdick'. The last three are drag queen friends of Wilma.
- Episode 22 - sponsored by 'House of Priscilla', (exclusive outfitters to 'Wilma Bumhurt')
- Episode 23 - sponsored by Glydeheath
- Episode 24 - sponsored by ACON, Guest star Terry Walkinshaw as a Peer educator

=== Season 4 ===
After the devastating news that he is HIV poz, Micky wants time alone and Jake respects it. Micky ends up picking up a guy in a bar and they go to the toilets to fool around – but when the guy admits he's poz, Micky is confronted and can't go through with it – it's too close to home. Back at home, Micky withdraws from Jake sexually and Jake is privately relieved, fearing for his own safety and feeling guilty about it.

Micky and Jake start having counselling sessions at ACON in the hope that it will help Micky come to terms with his status, but Micky struggles with articulating how he's feeling. Desperate to feel "normal" he secretly meets a guy online for sex, hoping he can fuck someone he doesn't care about. Again, however, Micky finds he can't go through it. Jake is also struggling with his fear of Micky's HIV status and secretly has sex with Stevie. Micky finds out about it though and Jake is wracked with guilt. It's only when Micky and Jake both break down in counselling and talk about their fears that they start to heal. Millie helps Micky by volunteering to have a baby with him one day. Micky decides to go on anti-retrovirals and he and Jake have sex again, finally back on an even keel.

AJ and Saxon grow closer as AJ spoils Saxon on his birthday with a new watch. Saxon is rapt – but AJ picks up a guy who steals the watch from his bedside table and AJ is too embarrassed to tell Saxon about it. He finally has no choice though and Saxon is upset, mainly because AJ is lying to him. The two have a heart to heart about their expectations of their relationship and AJ promises to be honest from now on. Saxon agrees to give him one more chance.

Dennis makes an effort to fix his relationship with his mother Yvonne, organising another lunch with her, this time out of drag. Relations at lunch, however, break down when Yvonne talks about how she kicked him out of home for being gay, based on her Catholic faith. Yvonne admits she hoped Dennis would come back to her one-day and here he is. Hurt and offended, Dennis stomps out. Later, Dennis introduces Yvonne to his elderly gay friend, Phil, who, like Yvonne, is grieving the death of his partner after 37 years together. Phil asks Yvonne if God would value his love for Norm any less than her love for her recently deceased husband – and Yvonne has to admit God probably wouldn't. It's a breakthrough and Dennis is pleased. He ends up inviting Yvonne to a drag show in which Wilma is performing and even gets her up on stage as the audience applauds; their relationship finally on the up and up.

=== Season 5 ===
AJ is talked into having Crystal Meth by criminal lawyer and recreational user, Stevie. As a result, the two end up having unsafe sex. The next morning, a regretful AJ goes to his doctor to get a prescription for PEP, the "morning after" medication that protects against possible exposure to HIV. AJ then tentatively starts a relationship with visiting US singer Ritchie Valentine, but finds is hard to let his emotional defences down. Ritchie perseveres and the two grow closer. But is too-good-to-be-true Ritchie all that he seems?

Saxon starts seeing Stevie but is concerned to learn of his liking for Crystal Meth. Saxon reveals he too had problem with the drug and won't go near it now, or associate with anyone who does. Stevie assures him he can stop at any time, but it proves more difficult than he realised.

Micky comes home unexpectedly and catches Wilma having sex with her sugar daddy boyfriend, Dan - a closeted, successful businessman who's married with a grown up son. Later. Micky reveals he has also slept with Dan, when he was working as a prostitute to survive. Both Wilma and Jake are thrown to learn this, but are ultimately forgiving. Meanwhile, Micky is still looking for a job and Dan ends up offering him a position at his recruitment agency. At first Micky is resistant, but when Dan assures him it will be a purely platonic relationship, Micky accepts the offer.

At the recruitment agency, Micky meets Dan's handsome son, Bryce, and they become friends. Through Micky, Bryce meets Millie and the two are attracted to each other. Things fall apart, however, when Bryce pays Millie an unexpected visit at the apartment and ends up meeting Wilma in all her drugged-up glory after a big night on the town. Bryce freaks out over Wilma's uncontained behaviour and hightails it out of there. Meanwhile, Dan reneges on his promise to keep things platonic with Micky when he suggests they have sex again; he'll even pay for it like old times. Micky refuses and ends up admitting he's HIV poz. Shortly after Dan lets Micky go from his recruitment agency, stating he just lost a big client and can't afford to pay his wages anymore.

Dennis (a.k.a. Wilma out of drag), feeling guilty for accosting Bryce in her out-of-it state, goes to talk Dan about the incident - but finds Dan in no mood to have his decisions challenged. He ends up breaking up with Dennis/Wilma on the spot and threatening to call security if Dennis doesn't leave his office immediately. Hurt, Dennis returns home, learns Dan tried to crack on to Micky and decides to get revenge. Soon, Wilma arrives at Dan's home unannounced and gives his wife an envelope, then walks away. Dan's wife is shocked to open the envelope and find it contains pics of her husband and Wilma having sex.

=== Season 6 ===
AJ and Ritchie grow closer as AJ lets down his defences. But things turn sour when AJ catches Ritchie having sex with a guy in the Colombian Hotel toilets – and AJ is even more hurt when Ritchie doesn't contact him to explain. He goes on a bender and ends up back at the Colombian when Ritchie is performing. A drunken AJ starts hurling abuse at the singer, only to be thrown out by bar manager Matt.

Meanwhile, Saxon continues to see Stevie who stays off crystal for the sake of their relationship. But when Stevie sees Saxon and AJ kissing (Saxon's way of comforting AJ after being so hurt by Ritchie), Stevie deals with his pain by going on a crystal bender. Later, AJ heads home with Saxon to have sex only to find an out-of-it Stevie waiting at the door, wanting to have sex with both of them. Saxon sedates him and the following morning talks him into going home to Adelaide to dry out.

AJ is distressed to receive an sms from Ritchie simply saying "Sorry". Saxon arrives to inform him Stevie has gone back to Adelaide and he and AJ acknowledge it would have been a mistake to have sex again. They agree to be just friends.

Despite Millie's concerns, Dennis/Wilma feels it was the right thing to do dumping Dan in the shit with his wife. But then an agitated Bryce turns up at the penthouse, furious with Wilma for destroying his family. Wilma tries to calm him down but Bryce won't hear it and stomps out, a powder keg ready to blow.

After seeing all the problems Dan's closeted status has caused, Jake decides to come out to his family - but Micky freaks out, believing it's too close to home; that he'll end up being outed as well. Jake agrees to hold off coming out, much to Wilma's ire – Micky has no right to stop Jake from doing what he wants to do! But Jake plays it down; it's no big deal and Micky's feelings are more important to him.

Now that Dan isn't supporting him financially, Dennis is forced to get a job - which leads to a string of comical attempts that go nowhere. When all looks lost, Dennis's mother saves the day by informing him his father left him $50,000.

Micky feels privately guilty over talking Jake out of coming out to his family – but it all changes after Bryce and a thug cohort bash Wilma and Jake late one night when they're on their way home from the Colombian. Bryce tries to stay anonymous but Wilma recognises him and dobs him into the cops. Dan contacts her, wanting her to drop the charges and begging for another chance, finally free to be himself - but Wilma sticks to her decision. The bashing also makes Micky put things into perspective - he loves Jake and wants to do the right thing by him. He calls his family and says he and Jake are coming home to talk about something important. Jake realises Micky is also going to come out to his family as well and they seal the momentous decision with a kiss.

=== Season 7 ===
Still reeling from his heartbreak over Richie, AJ spirals and has more frequent one night stands. Jake, Micky & Millie return home to Bega six weeks after Micky's decision to come out to his family. Jake's family is shocked, but eventually comes to accept the news; however, Micky's family completely rejects him. Jake's sister, Randy, reveals she is a lesbian and has been in a relationship with a woman named Frankie.

=== Season 8 ===
Jake and Micky are asked by Jake's sister about donating sperm to her girlfriend so they may have a baby together, but the discussion is thrown off when they find out Jake is considering going on PrEP - because Micky is HIV Pos. Meanwhile, Saxon is torn between Matt and Stevie, who recently returned after abstaining from drugs. Wilma starts dating a man named Joe, but complications arise when he reveals he is only into Wilma, not his male persona.

=== Special Episode ===
Retelling of season 1 and 2, with most of the cast reprising their roles, except for Sarah Mouella who was replaced by Anna Bauert.
