= John B. Murray (filmmaker) =

Australian filmmaker and author (died 2020)

- Born: 1931/1932
- Died: 1 June (aged 88); Melbourne, Victoria, Australia
- Occupations: Writer; director; producer; distributor

John B. Murray (1931/1932 – 1 June 2020) was an Australian filmmaker and an author best known for The Naked Bunyip.

== Biography ==
His technique of distributing that film himself was very influential in the revival of the Australian film industry in the 1970s. He was the author of a detailed handbook for the Australian Film Commission entitled DELIVERY ITEMS: A Guide for Video and Film Producers and also the inaugural Executive Director of the Film, Radio & Television Board of the Australian Council for the Arts (now the Australia Council), during which time (in addition to funding the development of filmmakers and the art of film, television and radio generally) he established community access video centres throughout Australia. His experience in breaking the control of exhibition by the major distributors to gain outlets for The Naked Bunyip (1970) also led him, on behalf of the FR&TV Board, to create showcase cinemas for Australian films. These included The Longford (Melbourne) and The Chauvel (Sydney). The latter was incorporated in his concept that restructured the Paddington Town Hall to house a cinema, national video resource centre, video access centre and a radio station. It also included offices for the Australian Film Institute which administered the video centres and cinemas on behalf of the Film, Radio & Television Board.

Murray died on 1 June 2020 in Melbourne.

John D. Lamond called him "a pioneer, he dragged Australian audiences back into a theatre for the first time in years to look at an Australian film."

== Select credits ==
- The Naked Bunyip (1970) - writer, producer, director, distributor
- Libido (1973) - director
- Lonely Hearts (1982) - producer
- We of the Never Never (1982) - original producer
