= Belinda Giblin =

Australian actress

- Born: Sue Belinda Giblin; 2 March 1950 (age 76); Tamworth, New South Wales, Australia
- Education: University of Sydney, National Institute of Dramatic Art
- Occupation: Actress
- Years active: 1970–present
- Known for: The Box (TV series) as Kay Webster; The Sullivans (TV series) as Sister Sue Marriot; Sons and Daughters (TV series) as Alison Carr; Home and Away (TV series) as Martha Stewart
- Spouse: Axel Bartz
- Children: 2

Sue Belinda Giblin (born 2 March 1950) professionally billed as Belinda Giblin, is an Australian actress who has played prominent roles in theatre and television soap operas, and several feature films.

Giblin's television roles include Kay Webster in The Box (1974-1975); Sister Sue Marriott in The Sullivans (1977–1978); and Alison Carr in Sons and Daughters (1985-1987). She has also had two stints in Home and Away, first briefly as Cynthia Ross in 1991, then as a more long term role of Martha Stewart, the long-presumed-dead wife of Alf Stewart, a role she played on a recurring basis from 2018 to 2022.

== Early life ==
Giblin was born in Tamworth, New South Wales to Phyllis and Ted. She has two older brothers Ted Jnr. and Graham, and a younger sister Allison. Her father Ted was a doctor at the Tamworth Base Hospital. Her mother ran the dramatic society, and acted and directed in productions. She died of breast cancer when Belinda was 23; her father died when he was 83.

Giblin later recalled that her first stage role was playing Buttons in Cinderella, a school play. "It was the first in a string of boy roles I played throughout my childhood." She was offered a scholarship to the Australian Ballet School when she was 17, but chose to study arts at the University of Sydney. She then studied at the National Institute of Dramatic Art, before leaving after a year to practise her craft. In 2015 she told Cassie Tongue at AussieTheatre.Com that 'the first professional acting work I did was playing young boy roles for ABC radio.'

== Career ==
Giblin appeared in the risqué, satirical 1970s soap opera The Box as Kay Webster, a role she reprised in the film based on the series in which the character used her married name, Kay Webster-Brooks. She also starred in the 1980s melodrama Sons and Daughters as Alison Carr. The Alison Carr character was revealed to be the post-plastic surgery incarnation of the show's original and much vaunted villain, 'Pat the Rat' – Patricia Hamilton, originally played by Rowena Wallace. Giblin was cast in the role because of her resemblance to Wallace.

Giblin featured in numerous series made by Crawford Productions, over a 12-year period early in her career. These included Matlock Police, Division 4, Homicide, The Sullivans, Bluey (1976) and Skyways,. Aside from Crawford shows, she has been seen in Alvin Purple (1976), Heartbreak High, and Good Guys, Bad Guys, as well as Home and Away in which she played Cynthia Ross in 1991 and Martha Stewart, the first wife of regular Alf Stewart, from 2018.

Since 2013, she has also guest starred in The Horizon, a gay shortform web series on YouTube, as Wilma (the drag queen's) mother.

In 2015, Giblin received acclaim and a nomination for Best Actress at the Sydney Theatre Awards for her role as Stella Goldschlag in Blonde Poison in a range of performances across Australia. The Gail Lowe play is a one-woman show about a Jewish woman who became a Nazi collaborator during World War II.

In 2017, she appeared as Babs DeVure in Bent 101, an Australian short form comedy series that was on the Seven Network.

On 9 February 2026, Giblin was named in the cast for the Australian tour for Steel Magnolias.

Giblin also works as a corporate trainer.

== Personal life ==
Giblin has been married to Axel Bartz (a set designer) since around 1984. She was performing in a theatre production Bedroom Farce when it came to Adelaide and Bartz was the resident designer of the Adelaide Theatre Company. She has two children, Romy and Nicholas, and lives in Leichhardt. Her father-in-law was in the German music corps.

== Filmography ==
=== Film ===
Year	Title	Role	Type
1971	Sacrifice	Girl	Film short
1974	Petersen	Moira	Feature film
1975	The Box	Kay Webster-Brooks	Feature film
1975	End Play	Margaret Gifford	Feature film
1979	Alison's Birthday released 1981	Isobel Thorne	Feature film
1985	The Empty Beach	Marion Singer	Feature film
2002	Spur		Film short
2003	At The Edge of the Bed	The Wife	Film short
2008	Not Quite Hollywood: The Wild, Untold Story of Ozploitation!	Self	Feature film documentary
2018	Stille Nacht	Mother	Film short
2021	Venus & Adonis	Queen Elizabeth 1st	Feature film
2022	A Stitch in Time	Christine	Feature film

=== Television ===
Year	Title	Role	Type
1971	GTK	Self - Actress as Girl 'Sacrifice' film	TV series, 1 episode
1972	The Spoiler	Guest role	TV series, 1 episode
1973	Odyssey		TV pilot
1973; 1975	Matlock Police	Guest roles: Jessica Fielding / Tracey	TV series, 2 episodes
1973	Homicide	Guest role: Niki	TV series, episode 408: "As Simple As ABZ"
1973	The Box	Regular role: Kay Webster	TV pilot
1974-1975	The Box	Regular role: Kay Webster / Kay Webster-Brooks	TV series, 193 episodes
1975	Quality of Mercy	Guest role:	TV series, 1 episode: "Papa"
1975	Division 4	Guest role:	TV series, 1 episode
1975	Whose Nude... Who Cares?	Self - Actress in scene as Kay Webster from The Box	TV documentary
1976	Alvin Purple	Guest role: Monique	TV series, episode 11: "O Death, Where Is Thy Sting?"
1976	Who Do You Think You Are?	Guest role	TV series, 1 episode
1977	Bluey	Guest role: Sergeant Tracey Alexander	TV series, episode 25: "It's Worth the Risk"
1977-1978	The Sullivans	Recurring role: Sister Sue Marriott	TV series, 106 episodes
1977	Say You Want Me	Julie Crosby	TV movie
1978	Chopper Squad	Guest role: Gail	TV series, episode 12: "Dangerous Weapon"
1978	Case for the Defence	Guest role: Terri Simpson	TV series, episode 4: "The Man Who Died Twice"
1978	Ripkin		Teleplay (screened as Stuart Wagstaff’s World Playhouse series)
1978	Demolition	Faith Camden	TV movie
1979-1981	Cop Shop	Guest roles: Cheryl Haywood / Roxanne Patton / Fiona Bradley	TV series, 5 episodes
1979-1980	Skyways	Recurring role: Christine Burroughs	TV series, 12 episodes
1980	Bellamy	Guest role: Julie	TV series, episode 7: "Daring Young Man"
1981	A Sporting Chance	Guest role: Claire Bartlett	TV series, episode 6: "A Full House"
1983	A Country Practice	Guest role: Zoe Parker	TV series, episodes 37 & 38: "Still Life"
1984	Carson's Law	Guest role: Myra Atridge	TV series, episode 125: "An Anxious Advocate" & episode 126: "The Devil’s Work"
1984	Crime of the Decade	Jane Fletcher	TV movie
1984	Hospital		TV Pilot
1985	The Man in the Iron Mask	Self - Voice	Animated TV film
1985	Winners - On Loan	Marj	TV film
1985–1987	Sons and Daughters	Regular role: Alison Carr	TV series, seasons 4–6; 316 episodes
1991	Home and Away	Recurring role: Cynthia Ross	TV series, season 4, 11 episodes
1995–1996	Heartbreak High	Recurring role: Suzie Miller	TV series, Seasons 2 & 4, 4 episodes
1997	Good Guys, Bad Guys	Loretta Monk	TV series, pilot episode: "Only the Young Die Good"
1998	Home and Away	Guest role: Catherine Clements	TV series, season 11, 1 episode
2003	MDA	Guest role: Renee Salmon	TV series, season 2, episode 9: "Crossing the Line"
2004	Out There	Guest role: Aging Movie Queen	TV series, season 2, episode 3: "This Just In"
2013–2015	The Horizon	Recurring role: Yvonne Forbes	YouTube web series; season 2
2017	Bent 101	Babs De Vure	TV series
2018–2022	Home and Away	Recurring role: Martha Stewart	TV series, Seasons 31–35
2019	Home and Away: Christmas In Summer Bay	Self - Actress as Martha Stewart	TV miniseries, 2 episodes
2025	Optics	Regular role: Meredith Laughton	ABC TV series

== Theatre ==
Year	Title	Role	Type
1970	You Can't Take It With You	Alice Sycamore	UNSW Old Tote Theatre
1971	Miss Jairus		Jane Street Theatre with NIDA
1971	Girl in the Freudian Slip		
1972	The Removalists		
1972	The Anniversary		
1975	Bloody Harry		Independent Theatre
1976	Martello Towers	Jennifer Martello	Nimrod Upstairs
1979	Bedroom Farce	Jan	Her Majesty's Theatre & Adelaide
1980	Quadraphrenia	Marion / Jenny	Playbox Theatre, Melbourne
1979	Errol Flynn's Great Big Adventure Book For Boys		
1982	The Anniversary		Phillip Street Theatre
1984	The World is Made of Glass	Emma	St Martins Theatre Melbourne
1984	Taking Steps		Ensemble Theatre
1988	Move Over Mrs Markham		Glen Street Theatre
1989-1990	How the Other Half Loves		Glen Street Theatre, Laycock Street Theatre, University of Sydney, Footbridge Theatre
1990	Henceforward		Marian Street Theatre
1990	The Increased Difficulty of Concentration		
1992-1994	Steaming	Josie	Australian national tour with Garry Penny Productions
1993	Canaries Sometimes Sing		Marian Street Theatre
1993	Reflected Glory		Ensemble Theatre
1994-1995	The Wild Party		Lookout Theatre, Woollahra, Mietta's Melbourne
1995	How the Other Half Loves		Marian Street Theatre
1996	Blithe Spirit	Elvira	Suncorp Theatre, Brisbane with QTC
1997	Same Time Another Year	Doris	Nambour Civic Centre with Perth Theatre Company
1998	Social Climbers		
1998	Bell, Book and Candle		
1999	Things We Do For Love		Marian Street Theatre
2001	Noises Off	Belinda	Playhouse, Sydney Opera House with Ensemble Theatre
2002	Wicked Sisters	Lydia	Stables Theatre with Griffin Theatre Company
2002	The Vagina Monologues	The Actress	
2003	Love Child	Anna	Stables Theatre
2003	Scam	Sonia / Beth	Belvoir Theatre Company
2004	Away	Gwen	STC
2005-2007	The Shoe-Horn Sonata	Sheila	Australian national tour
2005	The Q Story		Q Theatre, Penrith
2007	Dinner	Paige	Stables Theatre with Griffin Theatre Company
2009	Absurd Person Singular	Marion	Ensemble Theatre
2014	Dark Voyager	Hedda Hopper	Ensemble Theatre
2014	Daylight Saving	Bunty	Darlinghurst Theatre Company
2015-2016	Blonde Poison	Sheila	Old Fitzroy Theatre, The Studio, Sydney Opera House, Southbank Theatre
2016	The Turquoise Elephant	Olympia	Stables Theatre with Griffin Theatre Company
2017	Doubt	Sister Aliysius	Old Fitzroy Theatre
2019	John	Mertis Katherine Graven	Seymour Centre
2018	Ear to the Edge of Time	Geraldine	Sport for Jove
2019	Happy Days	Winnie	Redline Theatre Co
2020	Family Values	Sue	Stables Theatre with Griffin Theatre Company
2022	Ghosting the Party	Grace	Stables Theatre
2022	Amadeus	Venticelli	Red Line Productions
2023	Suddenly Last Summer	Mrs Violet Venable	Ensemble Theatre
2023	The Weekend	Adele	Belvoir Theatre Company
2023	Venus and Adonis	Queen Elizabeth	Seymour Centre with Sports for Jove
2026	Steel Magnolias	Ouiser	Australian Tour
