= The Coming of Stork =

Play written by David Williamson

- Original language: English
- Written by: David Williamson
- Characters: 2W 5M
- Genre: comedy
- Setting: Melbourne, Australia

Premiere
- Date: 25 September 1970
- Place: La Mama, Melbourne

The Coming of Stork was the first play written by David Williamson.

The cast for the original production included Martin Phelan, Dennis Wilson, Alan Finney, Bruce Spence and Peter Cummins. It was directed by Finney and Phelan.

A revised version premiered on 3 January 1973 at the Australian Theatre, Sydney, designed by Lee Whitmore and directed by Aarne Neeme.

It was adapted into the feature film Stork in 1971, starring Bruce Spence.

== Plot ==
A socially awkward and loudly left wing student comes to share a flat with three of his University friends with disastrous results.

== Background ==
Williamson was asked to write a ten minute script for a Carlton theatre and ended up writing a full length play.

The play was autobiographical.

== Characters ==
On-Stage:

Anthony "Tony" Doyle, mid-20s, has had nine jobs since college graduation, reputation for having a big dick ... Martin Phelan, Ray Gurney
Ian West, mid-20s, trainee marketing executive, General Motors ... Dennis Wilson, Bruce Myles
Clyde Henry, mid-20s, accountant ... Alan Finney, Matthew O'Sullivan
Anna, 20, Clyde's girlfriend ...Shirley-Ann Kear, Zoe Lake
Graham "Stork" Wallace, mid-20s, former medical student and activist ... Bruce Spence, Rod Williams
Alan Bartlett, 46, Anna's other boyfriend, married with kids ... Peter Cummins, Mark Kelly
Helen, Rivka Hartman, (deleted in revised version)

Mentioned:

Joanna, daughter of a tinpot manufacturer, Tony's girlfriend
Big Ed, West's Yank boss
Maggie the Cat, gangbanger who stuffed a banana in Stork's pants rather than let him in
Bob Martin, school friend of Clyde's. They would bash cats' brains out on concrete.
Captain Richards, pilot
Robin, girl Tony tries to match with Stork, film lover; they have a failed discussion about Federico Fellini's 8½
Abigail-Marie, nurse Tony's new girlfriend, marries a stockbroker
Mick Masters, ex-boyfriend Abigail-Marie Johnny Taylor, goes out with another of Mick Masters's nurses that West wanted
Mrs. Bartlett
Their sons
Nerilie Bartlett, their daughteer
Antoinette, Tony's next girlfriend
Chrissy Armitages, friend of Anna who lives in Toorak
