= Jacki Weaver =

Australian actress (born 1947)

Jacki Weaver AO
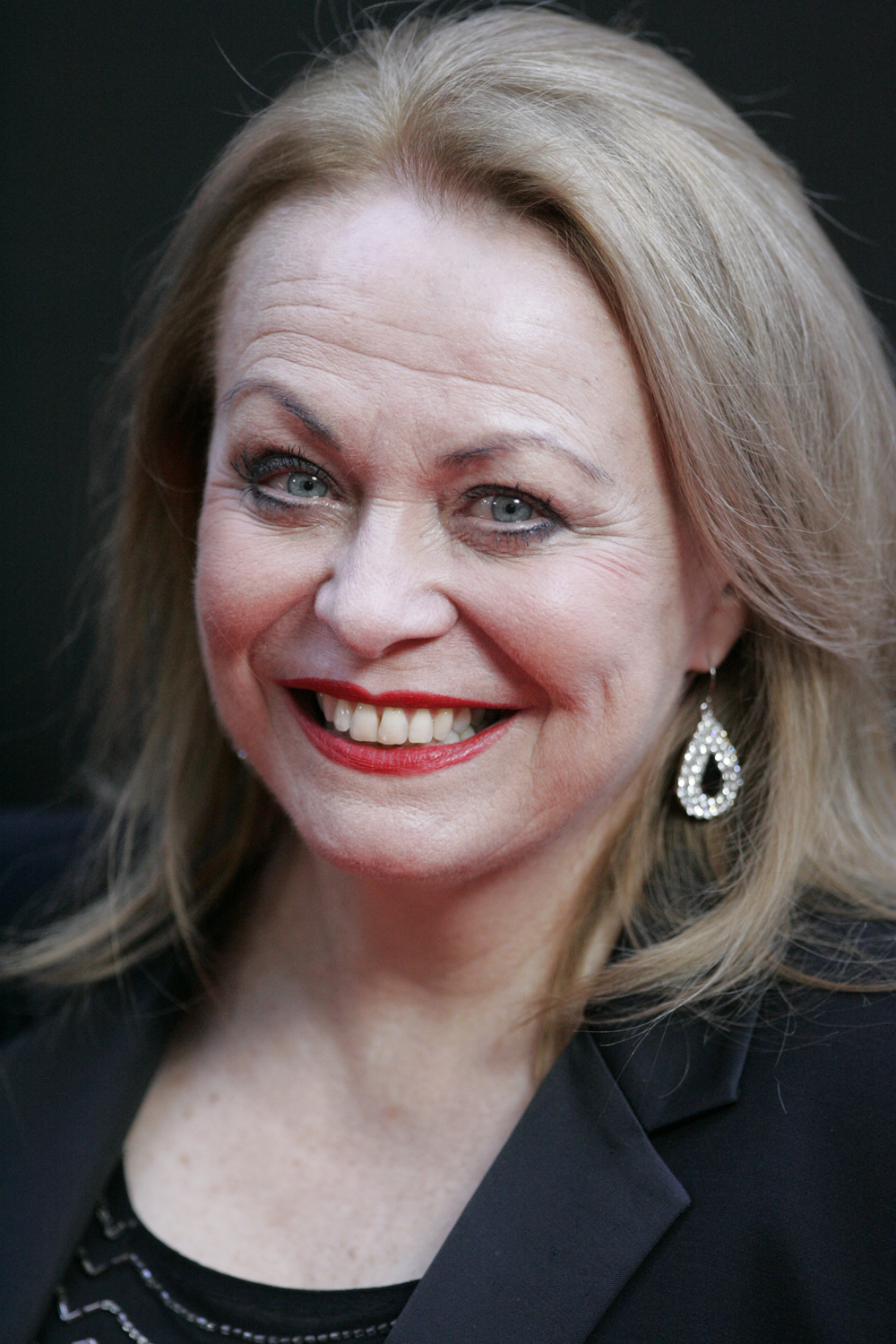
- Weaver in 2012
- Born: Jacqueline Ruth Weaver; 25 May 1947 (age 79); Hurstville, New South Wales, Australia
- Education: Hornsby Girls' High School
- Occupation: Actor
- Years active: 1962–present
- Spouses: David Price (m. 1966; div. 1970) Max Hensser (m. 1975; div. 1977) Derryn Hinch (m. 1983; div. 1998) Sean Taylor (m. 2003)
- Partner(s): John Walters (esp. 1969; sep. 1970); Richard Wherrett (esp. 1971; sep. 1974); Phil Davis (esp. 1977; sep. 1981)
- Children: 1

Jacqueline Ruth Weaver AO (born 25 May 1947) is an Australian theatre, film, and television actress. She emerged in the 1970s during the Australian New Wave through her work in Ozploitation films such as Stork (1971), Alvin Purple (1973), and Petersen (1974). She later starred in Picnic at Hanging Rock (1975), Caddie (1976), Squizzy Taylor (1982), and a number of television films and miniseries. She also starred in Australian productions of plays such as Death of a Salesman and A Streetcar Named Desire.

Weaver received international attention and nominations for the Academy Award for Best Supporting Actress for her performances in the crime film Animal Kingdom (2010) and the comedy drama film Silver Linings Playbook (2012), the former of which also earned her the National Board of Review Award. This attention led her to receive roles in further Hollywood projects, including the films The Five-Year Engagement (2012), Parkland (2013), Magic in the Moonlight (2014), The Disaster Artist (2017), Bird Box, Widows (both 2018), Poms (2019), Stage Mother (2020), and Father Stu (2022).

On television, Weaver starred in the Starz comedy series Blunt Talk (2015–2016), the Fox Showcase political thriller Secret City (2016–2019), the Epix thriller Perpetual Grace, LTD (2019), and the Stan science fiction series Bloom (2019–2020). Since 2021, she has played a recurring role as Caroline Warner in the Paramount Network neo-Western series Yellowstone.

== Early life ==
Jacqueline Ruth Weaver was born in Hurstville, a suburb of Sydney, New South Wales. Her mother, Edith (née Simpson), was a migrant from England, and her father, Arthur Weaver, was a Sydney solicitor. She attended Hornsby Girls' High School and was Dux of her school. She won a scholarship to study sociology at university, but instead embarked upon an acting career.

== Career ==
=== 1960s–2000s ===
Weaver has been working in Australian film, stage, and television since the 1960s. In 1963, at the age of 16, Weaver mimed the role of Gretel to the soprano Janet Rutledge in an ABC production of Engelbert Humperdinck's Hansel and Gretel, conducted by Sir Charles Mackerras. In 1964 at the Palace Theatre in Sydney, Weaver and a number of other Australian singers such as The Delltones and her then-boyfriend Bryan Davies performed a satire on the Gidget movies, in which Weaver performed as "Gadget". In the mid-1960s, she appeared on the Australian music show Bandstand. In one appearance, she sang a 1920s-style pastiche, the novelty song "I Love Onions". The turning point in her career came in 1965 just before she was about to go to university and was cast in the Australian TV series Wandjina!

In 1971, Weaver made her big screen debut playing the female leading role in the comedy film, Stork directed by Tim Burstall, for which she won her first Australian Film Institute Award. She later starred in the comedy films Alvin Purple (1973), and Petersen (1974). She played supporting role in Peter Weir's critically acclaimed mystery film version of Picnic at Hanging Rock (1975), and a more substantial appearance in Caddie (1976) for which she won her second Australian Film Institute Award. In the following years, Weaver appeared in TV series, miniseries, and made-for-television movies, playing leading and supporting roles. Her notable television movies including Polly Me Love (1976), and Do I Have to Kill My Child? (1976), for which she received Logie Award for Best Individual Performance By An Actress.

Weaver starred in the miniseries Water Under the Bridge (1980) and The Challenge (1986), and 1982 drama film Squizzy Taylor. Also in the 1980s she appeared alongside Sir Les Patterson and politician Barry Jones on Parkinson Contrary to popular belief, Weaver has never appeared in a soap opera. She starred in the 1988 ABC drama series, House Rules about a Melbourne house-wife who becomes a member of parliament. After years off-screen, Weaver returned to film starring in the comedy-drama Cosi.

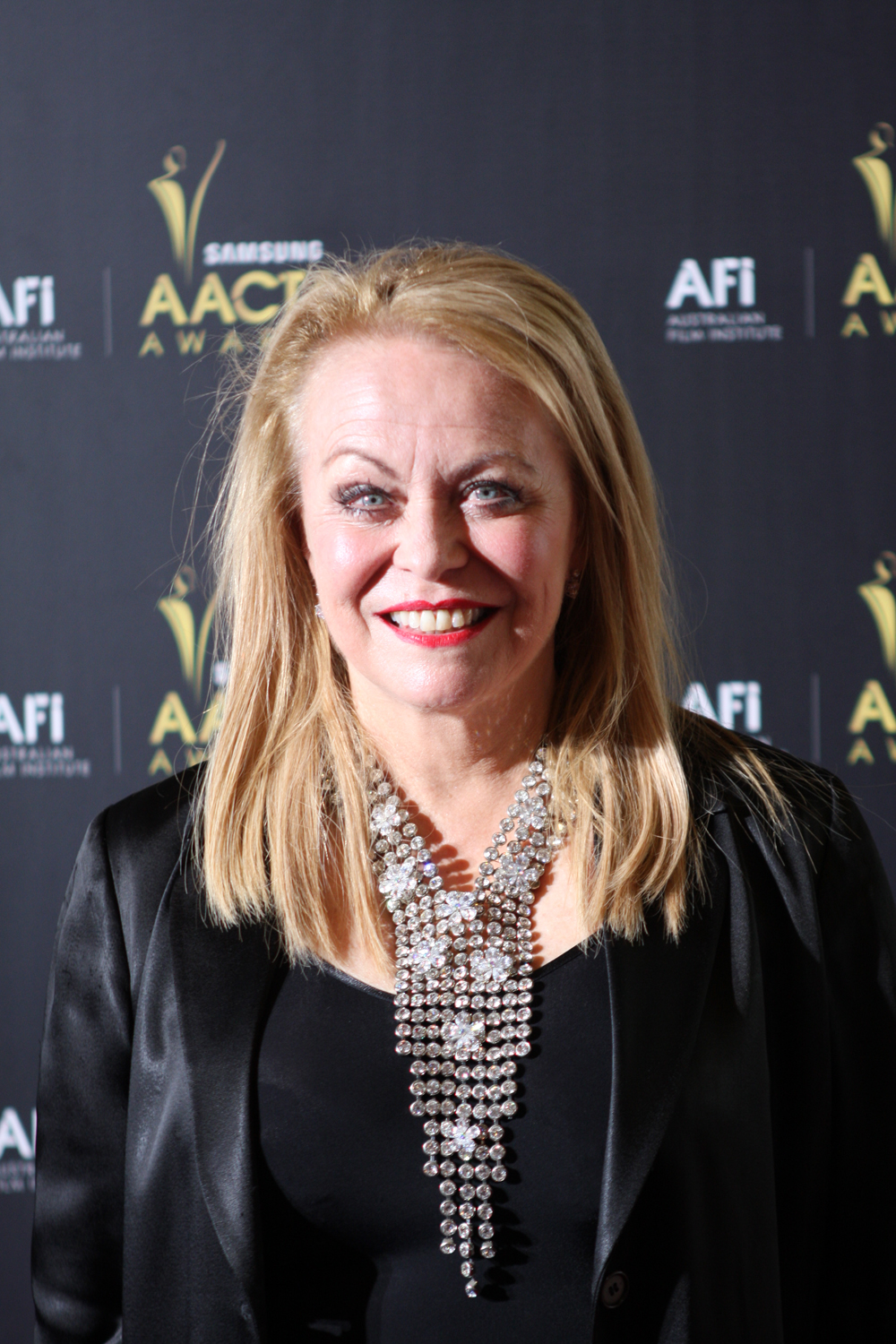
Weaver at the AACTA Awards in Sydney, 31 January 2012

In the 1990s and early 2000s, Weaver found it increasingly difficult to gain roles on screen or television and she devoted much of her energy to the Australian stage, starring in plays including A Streetcar Named Desire, Last of the Red Hot Lovers, Death of a Salesman, Reg Cribb's Last Cab to Darwin, and Chekhov's Uncle Vanya alongside Cate Blanchett and Richard Roxburgh in 2010–11. Weaver has performed in more than 80 plays. Her stage abilities were recognised with a "Mo" award. In 2005, she released her autobiography, Much Love, Jac.

=== 2010–present ===
In 2010, Weaver starred in the Melbourne-set crime thriller Animal Kingdom playing a gang family matriarch. Her performance received praise from film critics and earned her Critics' Choice, Golden Globe Award, and Academy Award nominations as well as winning the Australian Film Institute Award, the National Board of Review, the Los Angeles Film Critics Association Award, and a Satellite Award.

Weaver made her Hollywood debut with the 2012 comedy The Five-Year Engagement, alongside Emily Blunt and Jason Segel, and starred in Park Chan-Wook's English-language debut, Stoker, alongside fellow Australian actors Nicole Kidman and Mia Wasikowska, and British actor Matthew Goode. In 2012, Weaver received Actor Award, Critics' Choice, and Academy Award nominations for her role as a supportive mother in the comedy-drama film Silver Linings Playbook.

Weaver played Marguerite Oswald in the 2013 historical drama film Parkland and same year starred in the supernatural horror film Haunt. She made her American television debut guest-starring as a Rebel Wilson' character mother in her short-lived comedy series Super Fun Night. In 2014, she starred in the adaptation of Richard Alfieri's play Six Dance Lessons in Six Weeks opposite Gena Rowlands, Marjane Satrapi's comedy-horror The Voices, and the romantic comedy Magic in the Moonlight written and directed by Woody Allen. She returned to Australia appearing in Last Cab to Darwin (2015) and Goldstone (2016) receiving Australian Film Critics Association for Best Supporting Actress. Her other notable film credits including Equals (2015), The Polka King (2017), Life of the Party (2018), Bird Box (2018) and Widows (2018). She starred alongside Diane Keaton, Pam Grier and Rhea Perlman in the 2019 comedy film Poms (2019). The following year, she played the leading role in the comedy-drama film Stage Mother. Also that year, she starred in The Grudge, a remake of the 2004 supernatural horror film, and the Australian drama Penguin Bloom starring Naomi Watts. In 2022, she played Mark Wahlberg' mother in the biographical drama film Father Stu.

On American television, Weaver starred in the 2015 Fox limited series Gracepoint and the Starz comedy series, Blunt Talk (2015–16) opposite Patrick Stewart. She returned to Australia with starring role in the Fox Showcase political thriller Secret City (2016–19), and Stan science fiction series Bloom (2019–20). In 2019, she starred in the Epix thriller Perpetual Grace, LTD (2019) and in 2021 she began appearing in the recurring role as Caroline Warner in the Paramount Network neo-Western series, Yellowstone.

== Personal life ==
In September 1966 Weaver told TV Week that she would marry the pop singer Bryan Davies, adding that 'I'll probably get cold feet again like I've done before'. Shortly afterwards she married TV producer David Price, her director on the television series Be Our Guest, after an eight-week courtship. The marriage ended in 1970. She had a son that year with her partner at the time, John Walters. Weaver had a relationship of many years with Richard Wherrett, director of the Sydney Theatre Company.

She married Max Hensser in 1975. She lived with Phil Davis, a former Sydney crime reporter, Canberra Press Secretary, and executive producer for Mike Willesee, for five years until 1981. She married radio and television presenter Derryn Hinch in 1983. She and Hinch renewed their vows before divorcing in 1998.

She is currently married to actor Sean Taylor.

== Filmography ==
=== Films ===
Key
| † | Denotes films that have not yet been released |

| Year | Title | Role | Type |
|---|---|---|---|
| 1966 | They're a Weird Mob | Girl on beach | Feature film, Australia |
| 1970 | The Naked Bunyip | Herself | Feature film documentary, Australia |
| 1971 | Stork | Anna | Feature film, Australia |
| 1973 | Alvin Purple | Second Sugar Girl | Feature film, Australia |
| 1974 | Petersen | Susie Petersen | Feature film, Australia |
| 1975 | Picnic at Hanging Rock | Minnie | Feature film, Australia |
| 1975 | The Removalists | Marilyn Carter | Feature film, Australia |
| 1976 | Caddie | Josie | Feature film, Australia |
| 1982 | Squizzy Taylor | Dolly | Feature film, Australia |
| 1983 | Abra Cadabra | Primrose Buttercup (voice) | Animated feature film, Australia |
| 1996 | Cosi | Cherry | Feature film, Australia |
| 1997 | The Two-Wheeled Time Machine | Older Alice | Short film, Australia |
| 1999 | In the Red | Unknown | Feature film, Australia |
| 2008 | Three Blind Mice | Bernie Fisher | Feature film, Australia |
| 2009 | Early Checkout | Cleaner | Short film, Australia |
| 2010 | Animal Kingdom | Janine "Smurf" Cody | Feature film, Australia |
| 2010 | Summer Coda | Jen | Feature film, Australia |
| 2011 | Lois | Lois | Short film, Australia |
| 2012 | The Five-Year Engagement | Sylvia Dickerson-Barnes | Feature film, US |
| 2012 | Silver Linings Playbook | Dolores Solitano | Feature film, US |
| 2013 | Stoker | Aunt Gwendolyn "Gin" Stoker | Feature film, US |
| 2013 | Parkland | Marguerite Oswald | Feature film, US |
| 2013 | Haunt | Janet Morello | Feature film, US |
| 2014 | Six Dance Lessons in Six Weeks | Irene Mossbecker | Feature film, US/Hungary |
| 2014 | Reclaim | Reigert | Feature film, US |
| 2014 | The Voices | Dr. Warren | Feature film, US |
| 2014 | Maya the Bee | Buzzlina Von Beena (voice) | Animated feature film, Australia |
| 2014 | Magic in the Moonlight | Grace | Feature film, US |
| 2015 | Last Cab to Darwin | Dr. Farmer | Feature film, Australia |
| 2015 | Equals | Bess | Feature film, US |
| 2016 | Goldstone | The Mayor | Feature film, Australia |
| 2017 | The Polka King | Barb | Feature film, US |
| 2017 | Small Crimes | Irma Denton | Feature film, US |
| 2017 | The Disaster Artist | Carolyn Minnott | Feature film, US |
| 2018 | Irreplaceable You | Estelle | Feature film, US |
| 2018 | Life of the Party | Sandy Cook | Feature film, US |
| 2018 | Out of Blue | Miriam Rockwell | Feature film, US |
| 2018 | Widows | Agnieszka | Feature film, US |
| 2018 | Bird Box | Cheryl | Feature film, US |
| 2019 | Poms | Sheryl | Feature film, US |
| 2019 | Zeroville | Dotty | Feature film, US |
| 2019 | Elsewhere | Mom | Feature film, US |
| 2020 | The Grudge | Lorna Moody | Feature film, US |
| 2020 | Stage Mother | Maybelline Metcalf | Feature film, US |
| 2020 | Never Too Late | Norma McCarthy | Feature film, Australia |
| 2020 | Penguin Bloom | Jan | Feature film, Australia |
| 2021 | Back to the Outback | Jackie (voice) | Animated feature film, Australia |
| 2022 | Father Stu | Kathleen Long | Feature film, US |
| 2022 | American Murderer | Jeanne | Feature film, US |
| 2022 | Wildflower | Loretta | Feature film, US |
| 2024 | Memoir of a Snail | Pinky (voice) | Animated feature film, Australia |
| 2026 | Holy Days | Sister Mary Clare | Feature film, Canada/New Zealand |
| 2027 | Pendulum † | Ella Rose | Feature film, US |
| TBA | Trash Mountain † | TBA | Feature film, US |

=== Television ===
| Year | Title | Role | Notes |
|---|---|---|---|
| 1963 | Hansel and Gretel | Gretel | TV play |
| 1964 | Split Level | Dysfunctional child | |
| 1966 | Wandjina! | Ann MacPherson | |
| 1967 | The Schoolmistress | Dinah | TV play |
| 1967–1976 | Homicide | Guest roles: Hettie / Anne Johnson / Sue Ryan | 5 episodes |
| 1968 | The Unloved | Guest role | 1 episode |
| 1969 | Riptide | Liz | Episode: "Brethren Island" |
| 1969–1973 | Division 4 | Val Smith / Thea Kemp | 2 episodes |
| 1970 | Woobinda, Animal Doctor | | Episode: "Chocolate, Cherry or Pistachio" |
| 1971; 1973 | The Comedy Game | | 2 episodes |
| 1971 | The Godfathers | Matilda Mathews | Episode: "Waltzing Matilda" |
| 1971–1976 | Matlock Police | Kathy Marcus / Trudy Morton / Gail Hemming / Lindy Robinson | 4 episodes |
| 1971 | Spyforce | Guest role: Elaine Harrison | Episode: "The Volunteers: Part 1" |
| 1972 | Catwalk | Rock Wilson | Episode: "A Life in the Day Of" |
| 1972 | The Stirrers | | |
| 1973 | The Engagement | Ditzy virgin | TV play |
| 1974 | Silent Number | Anne | 1 episode |
| 1974 | This Love Affair | | Anthology series, 1 episode |
| 1974; 1975 | The Last of the Australians | Sandy / Gillie | 2 episodes |
| 1975 | The Seven Ages of Man | | 1 episode |
| 1975 | Polly Me Love | Polly | TV film |
| 1976 | Alvin Purple | Emily | 1 episode |
| 1976 | Up The Convicts | Regular role | |
| 1976 | Rush | Yvette Precot | Episode: "A Shilling a Day" |
| 1976 | Do I Have to Kill My Child? | Dianne | TV film |
| 1977 | Death Cell | Terrifying ghost | TV film |
| 1977 | The Faces of Dick Emery | Various characters | |
| 1979 | Cop Shop | Lynne Bennett | 1 episode |
| 1979; 1981 | Tickled Pink | | Episode: "Three Blind Mice" |
| 1979 | Patrol Boat | Journalist | 1 episode |
| 1980 | Water Under the Bridge | Maggie McGhee | Miniseries, 8 episodes |
| 1980–1981 | Trial By Marriage | Joan | |
| 1984 | Cut that Out | | TV special |
| 1984 | The Girl From Moonooloo | | TV film |
| 1985 | The Perfectionist | Barbara Gunn | |
| 1986 | The Challenge | Rasa Bertrand | Miniseries |
| 1987 | Dearest Enemy | | TV pilot |
| 1988 | House Rules | Julie Buckley | 24 episodes |
| 1990 | Rafferty's Rules | | 1 episode |
| 2007 | Hammer Bay | Aileen Blakely | TV film |
| 2009 | Satisfaction | Gillian | 2 episodes |
| 2013 | The McCarthys | Marjorie McCarthy | Unaired pilot |
| 2013 | Super Fun Night | Pamela Boubier | Episode: "Engagement Party" |
| 2014 | Gracepoint | Susan Wright | 10 episodes |
| 2015–2016 | Blunt Talk | Rosalie Winter | 20 episodes |
| 2016 | Sister Cities | Mary Baxter | TV film |
| 2016–2018 | Secret City | Senator Catriona Bailey | 9 episodes |
| 2018 | Mom Sandwich | | Video |
| 2019–2020 | Bloom | Gwendolyn 'Gwen' Reed | |
| 2019 | Perpetual Grace, LTD | Lillian | |
| 2021-2024 | Yellowstone | Caroline Warner | |
| 2023 | Hello Tomorrow! | Barbara Billings | |
| 2024 | Clipped | Shelly Sterling | Miniseries |

== Stage ==
| Year | Title | Role | Venue |
|---|---|---|---|
| 1962 | A Wish is a Dream | Cinderella | Phillip Street Theatre, Sydney |
| 1963 | Once Upon a Surfie | Gadget | Palace Theatre, Sydney |
| 1964 | Mother Goose and the Three Stooges | Jill | Palace Theatre, Sydney |
| 1965 | The Bandwagon | Aurora | Phillip Street Theatre, Sydney |
| 1965 | The Legend of King O'Malley | | New Zealand tour with Old Tote Theatre Company |
| 1966 | Ten Bob in Kitty | | Copenhagen Theatre Restaurant, Sydney |
| 1966 | Last Precious Stream | | Schools tour NSW |
| 1966 | Little Red Riding Hood | | Schools tour NSW |
| 1966 | The Schoolmistress | Dinah | Old Tote Theatre, Sydney |
| 1967 | Peter Pan | Peter Pan | Independent Theatre, Sydney |
| 1967 | The Imaginary Invalid | Louise | Old Tote Theatre, Sydney |
| 1967 | Hay Fever | Marian | Marian Street Theatre, Sydney |
| 1967 | The Runaway Steamboat | | Adelaide Festival |
| 1968 | You Never Can Tell | Dolly | Old Tote Theatre, Sydney |
| 1969 | Halfway Up the Tree | | |
| 1969 | Applicant | | Q Lunchtime Theatre, Sydney |
| 1969 | The Knack | Nancy | Theatre Royal, Hobart |
| 1969 | See the Pretty Lights | | Q Lunchtime Theatre, Sydney |
| 1971 | The Roy Murphy Show | Sharon the rugby league maid | Nimrod, Sydney |
| 1971 | After Magritte | 80yo tuba playing granny | Nimrod, Sydney |
| 1971 | Caste | Polly Eccles | Marian Street Theatre, Sydney |
| 1972 | The Removalists | Fiona | Nimrod, Sydney |
| 1972 | Forget-Me-Not Lane | Ursula | Old Tote Theatre, Sydney |
| 1974 | Love's Labour's Lost | Rosaline | Old Tote Theatre, Sydney |
| 1974–1975 | The Seagull | Masha | Nimrod, Sydney |
| 1975 | Tom | Susan | Nimrod, Sydney |
| 1975 | Customs and Excise | | Nimrod, Sydney |
| 1976 | A Streetcar Named Desire | Stella | Old Tote Theatre, Sydney |
| 1976 | Roberta | Roberta | |
| 1976–1978 | Bedroom Farce | Kate | Elizabethan Theatre Trust at Theatre Royal, Sydney |
| 1977 | Three Sisters | Natasha | Old Tote Theatre, Sydney |
| 1978 | Rockola | Blue Velvet | Nimrod, Sydney & Adelaide Festival |
| 1980–1981 | They're Playing Our Song | Sonia Walsk | Comedy Theatre, Melbourne |
| 1982 | Three Sisters | | |
| 1984 | Ben-Hur | | |
| 1985 | Born Yesterday | Billie Dawn | Sydney Opera House with STC |
| 1985 | The Real Thing | Annie | STC |
| 1986 | Having a Ball | Doreen | Elizabethan Theatre Trust |
| 1986 | Blithe Spirit | Elvira | MTC |
| 1987 | Emerald City | Kate | MTC |
| 1987 | A Day in the Death of Joe Egg | Sheila | MTC |
| 1990 | Daylight Saving | Felicity | Australian national tour with MTC |
| 1990 | Rumours | Chris | Gary Penney Productions |
| 1990–1992 | Love Letters | Melissa Gardner | Sydney Opera House with STC |
| 1991; 1993 | Shadowlands | Joy Gresham | Sydney Opera House with STC |
| 1992 | Six Degrees of Separation | Ouisa | STC |
| 1993 | Away | Coral | STC & Riverside Theatres Parramatta |
| 1994 | The Sisters Rosensweig | Dr. Gorgeous Teitelbaum | MTC |
| 1995 | Sydney Stories 2 | | |
| 1995 | Reunion | Ex-wife of rock star | Comedy Club, Melbourne & Australian national tour |
| 1997 | After the Ball | Judy | STC |
| 1997 | Navigating | Bea | QTC and MTC |
| 1999 | Fred | | STC |
| 1999 | Silhouette | Celia | Marian Street Theatre, Sydney |
| 1999 | Love Letters | Melissa Gardner | |
| 2000 | The Falls | Nellie | Stables Theatre, Sydney with Griffin Theatre Company |
| 2000 | Wharf Revue | | Wharf Theatre with STC |
| 2000 | Old Masters | Fleur | STC |
| 2000–2001 | Girl Talk | Julie | Australian national tour with Hit Productions |
| 2001 | Soulmates | Heather | STC, MTC & Newcastle Civic Theatre |
| 2001–2002 | Shadowlands | | STC |
| 2002 | Through the Wire | South African Jewish woman | Sydney Festival |
| 2002 | Three Sisters | | |
| 2003 | Last of the Red Hot Lovers | Elaine / Bobbie /Jeannette | Australian national tour with Hit Productions |
| 2003–2004 | Six Degrees of Separation | | |
| 2004 | Last Cab to Darwin | Dot, Mrs Gratton, Backpacker 2, Deirdre | Sydney Opera House, Octagon Theatre with Pork Chop Productions |
| 2004–2006, 2007 | The Blonde, the Brunette and the Vengeful Redhead | One woman show - 7 characters | Stables Theatre, Sydney |
| 2005 | Ruby's Last Dollar | Ruby | Pork Chop Productions |
| 2006 | A Hard God | Aggie | Wharf Theatre with STC |
| 2007 | Derrida in Love | Lina | Ensemble Theatre, Sydney |
| 2007 | Priscilla, Queen of the Desert | Shirley the bartender | Regent Theatre, Melbourne |
| 2008 | Death of a Salesman | Linda | Ensemble Theatre, Sydney |
| 2008 | The Prisoner of Second Avenue | Edna Edison | QTC |
| 2008 | The Pig Iron People | Rosie | STC |
| 2009 | Secret Bridesmaids' Business | Colleen Bacon | Arts Centre Melbourne with Kay & McLean Productions |
| 2010 | Entertaining Mr Sloane | Kath | STCSA |
| 2010 | Uncle Vanya | Nana | STC |
| 2010 | Let the Sunshine | Ros | QTC |
| 2013 | Solomon and Marion | Marion | Arts Centre, Melbourne |

== Awards and nominations ==
| Year | Nominated work | Award | Category | Result |
|---|---|---|---|---|
| 1971 | Stork | Australian Film Institute Awards | Best Actress in a Leading Role | Won |
| 1976 | Caddie | Australian Film Institute Awards | Best Actress in a Supporting Role | Won |
| 1978 | Do I Have to Kill My Child? | TV Week Logie Awards | Best Individual Performance by an Actress | Won |
| 1980 | They're Playing Our Song | Variety Club Awards | Variety Club Heart Award | Won |
| 1981 | Contribution to theatre | GLUG Awards | Contribution to Theatre Award | Won |
| 2001 | Old Masters | Mo Awards | Female Actor in a Play | Won |
| 2003 | Last of the Red Hot Lovers | GLUG Awards | Best Actress Award | Won |
| 2003 | Last Cab to Darwin | GLUG Awards | Best Actress Award | Won |
| 2010 | Animal Kingdom | Australian Film Institute Awards | Best Actress in a Leading Role | Won |
| 2010 | Animal Kingdom | National Board of Review Awards | Best Supporting Actress | Won |
| 2010 | Animal Kingdom | Satellite Awards | Best Supporting Actress – Motion Picture | Won |
| 2010 | Animal Kingdom | Village Voice Film Poll Awards | Best Supporting Actress | Won |
| 2010 | Animal Kingdom | Los Angeles Film Critics Association Awards | Best Supporting Actress | Won |
| 2010 | Animal Kingdom | San Francisco Film Critics Circle Awards | Best Supporting Actress | Won |
| 2010 | Animal Kingdom | Utah Film Critics Association Awards | Best Supporting Actress | Won |
| 2010 | Animal Kingdom | Dallas–Fort Worth Film Critics Association Awards | Best Supporting Actress | 2nd Place |
| 2010 | Animal Kingdom | National Society of Film Critics Awards | Best Supporting Actress | 3rd Place |
| 2010 | Animal Kingdom | IndieWire Critics Poll Awards | Best Supporting Performance | 4th Place |
| 2010 | Animal Kingdom | Academy Awards | Best Supporting Actress | Nominated |
| 2010 | Animal Kingdom | Golden Globe Awards | Best Supporting Actress in a Motion Picture | Nominated |
| 2010 | Animal Kingdom | Critics' Choice Movie Awards | Best Supporting Actress | Nominated |
| 2010 | Animal Kingdom | Saturn Awards | Saturn Award for Best Supporting Actress | Nominated |
| 2010 | Animal Kingdom | Awards Circuit Community Awards | Davis Award for Best Performance by an Actress in a Supporting Role | Nominated |
| 2010 | Animal Kingdom | Inside Film Awards | Best Actress | Nominated |
| 2010 | Animal Kingdom | Online Film Critics Society Awards | Best Supporting Actress | Nominated |
| 2010 | Animal Kingdom | Chicago Film Critics Association Awards | Best Supporting Actress | Nominated |
| 2010 | Animal Kingdom | Denver Film Critics Society Awards | Best Supporting Actress | Nominated |
| 2010 | Animal Kingdom | Washington D.C. Area Film Critics Association Awards | Best Supporting Actress | Nominated |
| 2010 | Animal Kingdom | Houston Film Critics Society Awards | Best Supporting Actress | Nominated |
| 2010 | Animal Kingdom | Detroit Film Critics Society Awards | Best Supporting Actress | Nominated |
| 2010 | Animal Kingdom | Central Ohio Film Critics Association Awards | Best Supporting Actress | Nominated |
| 2010 | Animal Kingdom | San Diego Film Critics Society Awards | Best Supporting Actress | Nominated |
| 2011 | Animal Kingdom | Film Critics Circle of Australia Awards | Best Supporting Actress | Won |
| 2011 | Animal Kingdom | Santa Barbara International Film Festival | Virtuoso Award | Won |
| 2011 | Animal Kingdom | Chlotrudis Awards | Best Supporting Actress | Won |
| 2011 | Animal Kingdom | National Society of Film Critics Awards | Best Supporting Actress | 3rd Place (tied) |
| 2011 | Animal Kingdom | Dublin Film Critics' Circle Awards | Best Actress | 9th Place (tied) |
| 2011 | Animal Kingdom | Critics' Choice Movie Awards | Best Supporting Actress | Nominated |
| 2011 | Animal Kingdom | Saturn Awards | Saturn Award for Best Supporting Actress | Nominated |
| 2011 | Animal Kingdom | Gold Derby Awards | Best Supporting Actress | Nominated |
| 2011 | Animal Kingdom | Alliance of Women Film Journalists Awards | EDA Award for Best Supporting Actress | Nominated |
| 2011 | Animal Kingdom | Online Film & Television Association Awards | Best Supporting Actress | Nominated |
| 2011 | Animal Kingdom | International Cinephile Society Awards | Best Supporting Actress | Nominated |
| 2012 | Animal Kingdom | London Film Critics' Circle | Supporting Actress of the Year | Nominated |
| 2012 | Silver Linings Playbook | AACTA Awards | Best International Supporting Actress | Won |
| 2012 | Silver Linings Playbook | Critics' Choice Movie Awards | Best Acting Ensemble | Won |
| 2012 | Silver Linings Playbook | Capri Hollywood International Film Festival | Best Ensemble Cast Award | Won |
| 2012 | Silver Linings Playbook | Academy Awards | Best Supporting Actress | Nominated |
| 2012 | Silver Linings Playbook | Screen Actors Guild Awards | Outstanding Performance by a Cast in a Motion Picture | Nominated |
| 2012 | Silver Linings Playbook | Gotham Awards | Best Ensemble Cast | Nominated |
| 2012 | Silver Linings Playbook | Awards Circuit Community Awards | Best Cast Ensemble | Nominated |
| 2012 | Silver Linings Playbook | Phoenix Film Critics Society Awards | Best Ensemble Acting | Nominated |
| 2013 | Silver Linings Playbook | Gold Derby Awards | Best Ensemble Cast | Won |
| 2013 | Silver Linings Playbook | AARP Movies for Grownups Awards | Best Supporting Actress | Won |
| 2013 | Silver Linings Playbook | Chlotrudis Awards | Best Supporting Actress | Nominated |
| 2013 | Silver Linings Playbook | Central Ohio Film Critics Association Awards | Best Ensemble | Nominated |
| 2013 | Silver Linings Playbook | Georgia Film Critics Association Awards | Best Supporting Actress | Nominated |
| 2013 | Hollywood breakthrough | Australians in Film Awards | Australians in Film Breakthrough Award | Won |
| 2014 | Lifetime achievement | AACTA Awards | Longford Lyell Award for lifetime achievement | Won |
| 2015 | Shadowlands | Variety Club Awards | Best Actress Award | Won |
| 2015 | The Sisters Rosensweig | | Best Actress Award | Won |
| 2016 | Lifetime achievement | GLUG Awards | Rodney Seaborn Memorial Award for Lifetime Achievement | Won |
| 2017 | Goldstone | Australian Film Critics Association Awards | Best Supporting Actress | Won |
| 2017 | Goldstone | Film Critics Circle of Australia Awards | Best Supporting Actress | Nominated |
| 2017 | The Disaster Artist | BAM Awards | Best Cast | Nominated |
| 2019 | Widows | Online Film & Television Association Awards | Best Ensemble Cast in a Film | Nominated |
| 2019 | Widows | Gold Derby Awards | Best Ensemble Cast in a Film | Nominated |
| 2019 | Bloom | TV Week Logie Awards | Silver Logie for Most Outstanding Supporting Actress | Won |
| 2019 | Bloom | AACTA Awards | Best Guest or Supporting Actress in a Television Drama | Nominated |
| 2020 | Bloom | AACTA Awards | Best Guest or Supporting Actress in a Television Drama | Nominated |
| 2020 | Poms | Alliance of Women Film Journalists Awards | EDA Special Mention Award for Actress Most in Need of a New Agent (Ensemble) | Nominated |
| 2021 | Penguin Bloom | AACTA Awards | Best Supporting Actress in a Film | Nominated |
| 2022 | Yellowstone | TV Week Logie Awards | Silver Logie for Most Popular Australian Actor or Actress in an International Program | Won |
| 2022 | Yellowstone | Gold Derby Awards | Best Guest Actress in a Television Drama | Nominated |
| 2022 | Yellowstone | Online Film & Television Association Awards | Best Guest Actress in a Drama Series | Nominated |
| 2025 | Memoir of a Snail | AACTA Awards | Best Supporting Actress in a Film | Won |
| 2025 | Memoir of a Snail | Alliance of Women Film Journalists Awards | Best Animated/Voiced Performance | Nominated |
