= Phillip Adams =

Phillip Adams, Philip Adams, or Phil Adams may refer to:

== Sports ==
- Phillip Adams (American football) (1988–2021), American football cornerback
- Phillip Adams (sport shooter) (born 1945), Australian pistol shooter
- Phil Adams (cricketer) (born 1991), Australian cricketer
- Philippe Adams (born 1969), Belgian racing driver

== Others ==
- Phillip Adams (writer) (born 1939), Australian media personality
- Sir Philip Adams (1915–2001), British diplomat
- Philip Francis Adams (1828–1901), Surveyor General of New South Wales, Australia
