= An Essay on Pornography =

- Directed by: Christopher Cary
- Produced by: James Steiner
- Starring: Helen Mason; Glen Johnston; Terry Blake; John Fewester; Paul van Sebring; Doctor Twinkle
- Distributed by: BEF
- Release date: 31 May 1973
- Country: Australia
- Language: English
- Budget: A$30,000

An Essay on Pornography is a 1973 Australian film.
