= Jill Forster =

Australian actress (born 1936)

- Born: Jill Forster; 30 November 1936 (age 89); Twickenham, Middlesex. England
- Occupations: Actress, model
- Years active: 1964–2015
- Known for: SeaChange (recurring) as Meredith Monahan; The Restless Years as Heather Russell; The Box as Enid and Emma Parker; Motel as Gaye Gillian; Number 96 as Helen Sheridan
- Spouse: John Stanton
- Family: Peter Stanton (uncle)

Jill Forster (born 30 November 1936), is an English-born Australian retired actress and former model.

She is a triple AFI Award winning actress, well known for her roles in TV soap operas's and series, and in films (both features and telfilms) telefilms.

She is perhaps best known for her recurring role in TV series SeaChange as Monica Monahan

== Early life ==
Forster was born in Twickenham, Middlesex (now London) in the UK, and established herself as a model in London, before relocating to Australia in 1964 with her first husband, a TV producer.

== Career ==
=== Television ===
Forster's first role after arriving in Australia was in the Crawford Productions espionage adventure series Hunter, filmed on location in Woomera, South Australia for six weeks. After the experience, she decided she wanted to act full time.

Forster has primarily appeared in small cameo roles, although she is well known for her roles in early series Motel and as the second actress to portray Helen Sellers, the wife of Tom Oliver Jack Sellers in soap opera Number 96, in 1973 to 1974, replacing original actress Carmen Duncan.

She also had prominent roles in several other soap operas including The Box as Enid and her sister Emma Parker.and The Restless Years from 1977 to 1979, as Heather Russell.

She also hosted the 1970 Freaky Black Friday Spook Special and ATN 7's 1972 series Creature Features as Vampira.

In 1984, Forster had a recurring role in cult prison drama Prisoner as Kerryn Davies. The same year, she also appeared in biographical cricket miniseries Bodyline, opposite Hugo Weaving and Gary Sweet.

Forster then played Mrs. Haversham in the 1987 period drama miniseries Great Expectations: The Untold Story, earning a nomination for an Australian Film Institute Award for Best Actress in a Leading Role.

She also had a five-year stint on Beauty and the Beast.

She later played the regular role of Meredith Monahan in television drama SeaChange from 1998 to 2000, winning the 1999 AFI Award for Best Actress in a Leading Role.

Forster has had guest roles in numerous other Australian television dramas, including Skippy the Bush Kangaroo, Division 4, Homicide, Spyforce, Catwalk, A Time for Love, Birds in the Bush, Boney, Matlock Police, Ryan, Silent Number, The Evil Touch, Bellamy, Cop Shop, Holiday Island, The Sullivans, Carson's Law, Starting Out, The Power, The Passion, Special Squad, A Country Practice, The Flying Doctors, and The Man from Snowy River.

She has appeared in hundreds of television advertisements, including perfume and rum commercials.

=== Film ===
Forster starred in the 1973 feature film Libido, as Rosaline, receiving an Australian Film Institute Award for Best Actress in a Supporting Role for the role. The same year, she appeared opposite Graeme Blundell in the hit sex-comedy film Alvin Purple, as Mrs. Horwood, wife of Alvin's teacher.

In 1982, Forster appeared in the science fiction thriller Crosstalk as Mrs. Stollier. She featured in Beyond Innocence in 1986. Then in 1989, she starred in Devil in the Flesh as Jill Hansen.

She starred in the 1993 children's film Say A Little Prayer, which earned her another nomination for the Australian Film Institute Award for Best Actress in a Supporting Role.

Later on, she starred in 2006 mystery drama thriller Irresistible, alongside Sam Neill, Susan Sarandon and Emily Blunt.

== Personal life ==
Forster married Australian actor and her frequent co-star John Stanton in 1974, though the two had lived together for some years prior to their marriage. Their relationship began while they were shooting an episode of ABC’s Love Story. They also acted together in the TV series Matlock Police, Homicide, The Box and Bellamy. She also directed her husband in a 2009 stage production of And When He Falls, at Fortyfivedownstairs in Melbourne.

== Awards ==
Year	Award	Category	Work	Result
1973	Australian Film Institute	Best Supporting Actress	Libido	Won
1987	Australian Film Institute	Best Actress	Great Expectations: The Untold Story	Won
1993	Australian Film Institute	Best Supporting Actress	Say a Little Prayer	Nominated
1999	Australian Film Institute	Best Actress in a Leading Role in a Television Drama	SeaChange (episode: "Manna from Heaven")	Won

== Filmography (selected) ==
=== Film ===
Year	Title	Role	Type
1973	Alvin Purple	Mrs. Horwood	Feature film
1973	Libido	Rosaline / Martin's mother (segment "The Child")	Feature film
1982	Crosstalk	Mrs. Stollier	Feature film
1986	Beyond Innocence		Feature film
1989	Devil In The Flesh	Jill Hansen	Feature film
1993	Say a Little Prayer	Mrs Easterbrook	Feature film
2003	Prisoner Queen - Mindless Music & Mirrorballs	Liza	Feature film
2006	Irresistible	Helen	Feature film
2011	Magic	Grandmother	Film short
2015	Ladies Without Lipstick	Joyce	Film short

=== Television ===
Year	Title	Role	Type
1967; 1968	Hunter	Chris Charter / Alison Bean	3 episodes
1968	Motel	Gaye Gillian	135 episodes
1969	Skippy the Bush Kangaroo	Mary Lansbury	1 episode
1970	Freaky Black Friday Spook Special	Vampira	TV film
1970–1973	Division 4	Denise Mitchell / Deidre Simpson / Mrs. Hudson / Laura Montgomery	4 episodes
1970–1974	Homicide	Ieva Zervos / Barbra Hillis / Judy Campbell / Barbra Lacey / Eve Harrison / Kim Ridley / Karen Healey	7 episodes
1971	Spyforce	Anna	1 episode
1972	Catwalk	Sandra Goodall	1 episode
1972	A Time for Love		1 episode
1972	Birds in the Bush (aka The Virgin Fellas)	The Secretary	
1972	Boney	Elaine Simpson	1 episode
1972	Creature Features	Host – Vampira	
1972	The Lady and the Law	Peta Mann	TV film
1973	Wicked City	Brothel Madam	TV film
1973	Matlock Police	Eve Taylor	1 episode
1973	Ryan	Nurse Porter / Sheila	2 episodes
1973	Inside Alvin Purple	Herself / Mrs. Horwood	TV special
1973–1974	Number 96	Helen Sheridan/Sellars	21 episodes
1974	Silent Number	Prostitute	1 episode
1974	The Evil Touch	Pamela Larsen	1 episode
1975	Two-Way Mirror	Susan Maxwell	TV pilot
1975–1977	The Box	Enid Parker	261 episodes
1977–1979	The Restless Years	Heather Russell	99 episodes
1981	Bellamy	Mrs. Baker	Episode 23: "Vigilante"
1981; 1982	Cop Shop		
1982	Holiday Island		2 episodes
1982	The Sullivans	Isabelle	1 episode
1983	Carson's Law	Amelia Redman	2 episodes
1983	Starting Out	Dr. Jill Holt	
1984	Prisoner	Kerryn Davies	10 episodes
1984	Special Squad	Mrs. Watson	1 episode
1984	Bodyline		Miniseries, 2 episodes
1984; 1987	A Country Practice	Liz Ferguson / Di Lyall	4 episodes
1987	Great Expectations: The Untold Story	Mrs. Havisham	TV film
1988	The Flying Doctors	Judith McLean	1 episode
1989	The Power, The Passion	Sarah McAllister	
1996	Banjo Patterson's The Man From Snowy River (aka Snowy River: The McGregor Saga)	Lady Clough	1 episode
1998–2000	SeaChange	Meredith Monahan	39 episodes

== Theatre ==
Year	Title	Role	Type
1989	The Seagull	Arkardina	Monash University with Playbox Theatre, Melbourne
1988	Les Liaisons Dangereuses	Madame De Volanges	Playhouse Theatre, Melbourne with MTC
2001	Life After George		Australian tour with MTC
2009	And When He Falls	Director	Fortyfivedownstairs, Melbourne
