= Libido (1973 film) =

1973 Australian drama film

- Directed by: John B. Murray ("The Husband"); Tim Burstall ("The Child"); Fred Schepisi ("The Priest"); David Baker ("The Family Man")
- Written by: Craig McGregor ("The Husband"); Hal Porter ("The Child"); Thomas Keneally ("The Priest"); David Williamson ("The Family Man")
- Produced by: Christopher Muir; John B. Murray
- Starring: Judy Morris; Jack Thompson; Max Gillies; Robyn Nevin; Jill Forster; Elke Neidhardt
- Cinematography: Eric Lomas ("The Husband"); Robin Copping ("The Child"); Ian Baker ("The Priest"); Bruce McNaughten ("The Family Man")
- Edited by: Tim Lewis ("The Husband"); David Bilcock Jnr ("The Child"); Brian Kavanagh ("The Priest"); Edward McQueen-Mason ("The Family Man")
- Music by: Tim Healey & Bill Green ("The Husband"); Peter Best ("The Child"); Bruce Smeaton ("The Priest" & "The Family Man")
- Production companies: Producers' & Directors' Guild of Australia
- Distributed by: British Empire Films (Aust); Anglo-EMI (UK)
- Release dates: 6 April 1973 (Australia); 1974 (UK)
- Running time: 118 mins
- Country: Australia
- Language: English
- Budget: A$120,000

Libido is a 1973 Australian drama film comprising 4 segments written and directed as independent stories, but screened together as one piece, exploring a common theme of instinctive desire and contemporary sexuality.

John B. Murray directed the segment called "The Husband", written by Craig McGregor, Tim Burstall directed "The Child", from a screenplay by Hal Porter, Fred Schepisi directed Thomas Keneally's "The Priest" and David Baker directed playwright David Williamson's screenplay for "The Family Man".

== Plot ==
The four segments of the film average about 30 minutes in length and are presented in the following order.

- Part 1: "The Husband" - Focuses on a suburban husband and wife, their relationship and their sexual fantasies.
- Part 2: "The Child" - A lonely boy seeks revenge on a man he finds engaging in intercourse with his beloved governess.
- Part 3: "The Priest" - A priest contemplates leaving the church as a result of his indefatigable attraction to a nun.
- Part 4: "The Family Man" - The husband of a woman in labor arranges with a friend to take two women to a secluded beach house.

== Cast ==
"The Husband"

- Elke Neidhardt as Penelope
- Bryon Williams as Jonathon
- Mark Albiston as Harold

"The Child"

- John Williams as Martin
- Jill Forster as Mother
- Judy Morris as Sybil
- Bruce Barry as David
- Louise Homfrey
- George Fairfax

"The Priest"

- Robyn Nevin as Sister Caroline
- Arthur Dignam as Father Burn
- Vivean Gray as Elderly Nun
- Penne Hackforth-Jones as Nun
- Vivean Frau
- Vicki Bray
- Valma Pratt

"The Family Man"

- Jack Thompson as Ken
- Max Gillies as Gerald
- Debbie Nankervis
- Suzanne Brady

== Production ==
The film arose from a series of workshops held in 1971 by the Victorian Branch of the Producers and Directors Guild to help writers work in narrative cinema. Professional writers were invited to prepare short stories on the theme of love which were adapted and produced by members of the Guild. Four of them were linked in the film.

Tim Burstall wanted to direct the David Williamson segment but because he had worked with Williamson before was given the Hal Porter one, originally called The Jetty. Burstall made some key changes to the story to make it more autobiographical and work better for film. It was shot at Werribee Park Estate in June 1972.

All the stories were shot and filmed in and around Melbourne on 16mm for a budget of $100,000, including $26,000 from the Australian Council for the Arts. According to Burstall, the episodes directed by Murray, Baker and Schepisi cost about $7,000 each and his cost $13,000 - although he says the true cost, accounting for deferrals, was closer to $23,000. He says the total cost of shooting the film was $75,000 being $120,000 after deferrals.

British Empire Films later added some funds to enable the film to be blown up to 35mm (some sources say $20,000 others $36,000).

== Release ==
The film was a popular success in Australia and screened overseas. Within two years of the film's release all deferred fees had been paid back. However, when the film screened in Spain, the segment "The Priest" had to be cut. The movie led to Williamson and Thompson later collaborating on Petersen.

By 1979 Burstall estimated the film had returned between $60,000 and $75,000 to the producers.

=== Awards ===
In 1973, the film won the Golden Reel Award for best fiction film from the Australian Film Institute for the segment The Child, and Judy Morris won the best actress award for her performance in the same segment.

=== Proposed sequel ===
Burstall said there was meant to be a follow-up film called The Bed, consisting of four stories revolving around the bed, written by Alan Marshall, Morris Lurie, John Powers and Max Richards, to be directed by Mal Bryning, Ross Dimsey, Simon Wincer and Rod Kinnear. However, they could not raise the money to make it.
