= Stork (film) =

- Directed by: Tim Burstall
- Written by: David Williamson
- Based on: The Coming of Stork by David Williamson
- Produced by: Tim Burstall
- Starring: Bruce Spence; Jacki Weaver; Graeme Blundell
- Cinematography: Robin Copping
- Edited by: Edward McQueen-Mason
- Music by: Hans Poulsen
- Production companies: Tim Burstall and Associates; Bilcock and Copping Film Productions
- Distributed by: Tim Burstall and Associates (initial release); Roadshow Films; Umbrella Entertainment
- Release date: 27 December 1971
- Running time: 85 minutes
- Country: Australia
- Language: English
- Budget: A$60,000 or $80,000"
- Box office: A$224,000 (Australia)

Stork is a 1971 Australian comedy film directed by Tim Burstall. Stork is based on the play The Coming of Stork by David Williamson. Bruce Spence and Jacki Weaver make their feature film debuts in Stork, being honoured at the 1972 Australian Film Institute Awards, where they shared the acting prize. Stork won the prize for best narrative feature and Tim Burstall won for best direction. Stork was one of the first ocker comedies. It was the first commercial success of the Australian cinema revival called the Australian New Wave.

== Plot ==
Stork is a 6-foot 7 hypochondriac who dreams of revolution and works at Holden's. He is sacked from his job after doing a strip tease at work and goes to live in a share house in Carlton with his friend Westy and two trendy young men, Tony and Clyde, who share the same girlfriend, Anna. Stork loses his virginity to Anna and falls in love with her.

Anna falls pregnant and Clyde decides to marry her. Stork interrupts the wedding.

== Cast ==
- Bruce Spence as Graham 'Stork' Wallace
- Jacki Weaver as Anna
- Graeme Blundell as Westy
- Sean McEuan as Tony
- Helmut Bakaitis as Clyde
- Madeleine Orr as Stork's mother
- Peter Green as clergyman
- Peter Cummins as sculptor
- Michael Duffield as judge
- Alan Finney as tailor
- Robin Copping as explorer
- David Bilock Jnr as explorer
- Larry Stevens as farmer
- Nanette Good as farmer's wife
- Kerry Dwyer as nun
- Brendan Cassidy as gallery manager
- Lynne Flanagan as matron
- George Whaley as businessman
- Jan Friedl as woman's libber
- Dennis Miller as uni lecturer
- Terry Norris as Anna's father
- Max Gillies as Uncle Jack
- The Captain Matchbox Whoopee Band
- Brian Moll as priest
- Jane Clifton as student (uncredited)

== Production ==
The play The Coming of Stork had premiered in 1970 at La Mama Theatre, run by Betty Burstall. Her husband Tim Burstall saw the play and hired Williamson to adapt it, commenting that:

It had a kind of gaiety and brio. It was good-natured and it celebrated our own lives in a very straightforward way. It wasn't the precious or arty. It was Australian comedy of a pretty straightforward sort, but also of a pretty well-observed and accurate sort.

Most of the budget was raised privately; Burstall had obtained $7,000 from the Experimental Film and Television Fund to make a film called Filth which project manager Fred Schepisi allowed him to transfer over to Stork; $5,000 came from Bilcock and Copping, a company of Burstall's, with $21,000 from the sale of Burstall's Arthur Boyd paintings. Everyone was paid $200 a week. The film was shot in Melbourne in March and April 1971 on 16mm stock and a crew of twelve.

== Release ==
Tim Burstall and his associates initially released the film themselves at St Kilda Palais, where it ran for a six-week season, earning $50,000 and returning $20,000 to the producers. They expanded the number of cinemas it played in, moving into Sydney. Hoyts and Greater Union refused to distribute but the film was picked up by Roadshow, who played it throughout Australia, using 35 mm prints blown up from the original. The film was popular at the box office, taking $224,000 in film hire and returning $150,000 to the producers. It proved that low-budget films could be made and released profitably in Australia. This success led to Burstall and Roadshow establishing the production company Hexagon Productions.

== Awards ==
The film won the following awards:

- 1972 Australian Film Institute Awards:
  - AFI Award for Best Direction (Tim Burstall)
  - Grand Prix Award to Tim Burstall
  - Hoyts Prize for Best Performance for Best Actor (Bruce Spence)
  - Hoyts Prize for Best Performance for Best Actress (Jacki Weaver)
- $5,000 prize from Australian Film Development Corporation for best narrative feature

== Home media ==
Stork was released on DVD by Umbrella Entertainment in September 2011. The DVD is compatible with region codes 2 and 4 and includes special features such as interviews with Tim Burstall, Alan Finney, Bruce Spence, David Williamson, Betty Burstall, Jacki Weaver and Rob Copping, a short film title Three Old Friends and the making of Three Old Friends.
