= Petersen (film) =

- Poster for US theatrical release
- Directed by: Tim Burstall
- Written by: David Williamson
- Produced by: Tim Burstall
- Starring: Jack Thompson; Jacki Weaver; Wendy Hughes
- Cinematography: Robin Copping
- Edited by: David Bilcock
- Music by: Peter Best
- Production company: Hexagon Productions
- Distributed by: Roadshow Film Distributors; Avco-Embassy (USA)
- Release date: 25 October 1974
- Running time: 107 minutes
- Country: Australia
- Language: English
- Budget: AU$226,000 or $240,000
- Box office: $1,363,000 (Aust)

Petersen is a 1974 Australian drama film directed by Tim Burstall.

Petersen was a box office success and received wide distribution in the UK and US under the title Jock Petersen. Petersen is first and foremost a sobering critique of Australian life in the early 1970s. Petersen is considered one of the better social dramas from the early years of the Australian film revival. Stanley Kubrick praised the film on its release, particularly Burstall's direction and Jack Thompson's lead performance. Jack Thompson won the Hoyts Prize for Best Performance at the 1975 AFI Awards for his performance in Petersen. The movie helped establish him as a local film star.

== Plot ==
Tony Petersen is an electrical tradesman and former football star who is studying arts at the University of Melbourne, majoring in English. Despite being married to adoring wife Susie, Petersen is having an affair with his married lecturer, Trish Kent, and has a fling with student Moira as part of a protest. Trish's husband, Professor Charles Kent, is also seeing one of his students after class. Petersen and Trish talk about having a baby. Charles fails Petersen in his exams and Trish leaves for Oxford. Petersen rapes Trish and returns to his old life.

== Cast ==
- Jack Thompson as Tony Petersen
- Jacki Weaver as Susie Petersen
- Wendy Hughes as Dr. Patricia 'Trish' Kent
- Belinda Giblin as Moira
- Arthur Dignam as Prof. Charles Kent
- Charles "Bud" Tingwell as Reverend Petersen
- Helen Morse as Jane
- John Ewart as Peter
- David Phillips as Heinz
- Christine Amor as Annie
- Sheila Florance as Tony's Mother
- Sandy Macgregor as Marg
- Joey Hohenfels as Debbie
- Amanda Hunt as Carol
- George Mallaby as executive
- Anne Scott-Pendlebury as Peggy
- Dina Mann as Robyin
- Sandy Gore as suburban housewife

== Production ==
Burstall wanted to make the story as the first film from Hexagon Productions and commissioned David Williamson to write a screenplay, the original title of which was Sittin' and Tony Petersen. However Williamson was working on many projects at the time so Hexagon made two Alvin Purple films instead.

Burstall claimed that Graham Burke of Hexagon did not want to make Petersen, so Burstall tried to get funding from the Australian Film Development Corporation, but when they rejected the film Hexagon came on board. The film also used the working title Campus.

Jack Thompson was paid $1,000 a week. It was Wendy Hughes' first film and she later said "I didn't know whether I was Arthur or Martha half the time".

== Reception ==
Critical reception to the film was harsh; however Petersen grossed $1,363,000 at the box office in Australia, which is equivalent to $9,200,250 in 2009 dollars. Burstall says it made a profit of $70,000 from its Australian release alone. The film was also released in the US and UK and made a star of Jack Thompson.

== Home media ==
Petersen was released for the first time on DVD by Umbrella Entertainment in October 2016.

| Title | Format | Episodes | Discs/Tapes | Region 4 (Australia) | Special features | Distributors |
|---|---|---|---|---|---|---|
| Petersen | DVD | Film | 1 | 5 October 2016 | Interviews with Alan Finney, David Williamson, Robin Copping, Wendy Hughes, Jack Thompson and Jacki Weaver Photo Gallery Theatrical Trailer | Umbrella Entertainment |

== See also ==
- Cinema of Australia
