= Betty Burstall =

Australian theatre director

Betty Burstall AM
- Born: Betty Margaret Rogers; 4 February 1926; Australia
- Died: 14 June 2013 (aged 87)
- Occupations: Theatre director, theatre founder
- Spouse: Tim Burstall
- Family: Sigrid Thornton (daughter in law)

Betty Margaret Burstall AM (born Betty Margaret Rogers 4 February 1926 – 14 June 2013) was an Australian theatre director who founded the La Mama Theatre in Melbourne in 1967. Burstall and her theatre are credited with leading the growth of contemporary theatre in Melbourne during the 1960s and 1970s.

== Biography ==
Burstall was inspired to establish the theatre after returning from New York City. She introduced off-Broadway contemporary theatre to Melbourne through La Mama. Numerous actors and writers have appeared and worked at La Mama, including Graeme Blundell, Kerry Dwyer, Jack Hibberd, and John Romeril, all of whom formed the Australian Performing Group.

In 1976, Burstall turned over the day-to-day operations of La Mama to Liz Jones, who remained the theatre's artistic director until 2023. Burstall continued as script adviser until 2004.

She served as one of the general members of the Australia Council from its inception in February 1973.

Burstall was appointed a Member of the Order of Australia in the 1993 Queen's Birthday Honours. She was inducted onto the Victorian Honour Roll of Women in 2001.

Betty Burstall was predeceased by husband, film director Tim Burstall, in 2004. She died on 14 June 2013, at the age of 87, survived by two sons and their wives, five grandchildren and five great-grandchildren. The actress Sigrid Thornton is her daughter-in-law.

A 1945 portrait of Burstall by Arthur Boyd is held by the National Portrait Gallery in Canberra, while Boyd's pencil drawing, "Betty Burstall with her son Dan" is held by the Art Gallery of South Australia.
