= Tim Burstall =

Australian film director (1927–2004)

- Born: 20 April 1927; Stockton-on-Tees, England
- Died: 19 April 2004 (aged 76); Melbourne, Australia
- Other name: Timothy Burstall
- Occupations: Film director, writer, producer
- Years active: 1960–1996
- Spouse: Betty Burstall

Timothy Burstall AM (20 April 1927 – 19 April 2004) was an English Australian film director, writer and producer, best known for hit Australian movie Alvin Purple (1973) and its sequel Alvin Rides Again (1974).

Burstall's films featured early appearances by many legendary Australian actors including Jack Thompson, Bruce Spence, Jacki Weaver, Alvin star Graeme Blundell, John Waters and Judy Davis.

Speaking just after Burstall's death, David Williamson said that Burstall "couldn't stomach" Australia's lack of a film industry. "He was determined to do something about it and he had the energy and spirit to do it. (He) was a very important cultural figure: highly intelligent, widely read, with a succinct and often highly controversial opinion on everything."

== Life ==
Burstall was born in Stockton-on-Tees, County Durham, England in April 1927. His family came to Australia in 1937 after his father took up a chair as professor of engineering at the University of Melbourne. Attending Geelong Grammar, Burstall was taught by historian Manning Clark. When his parents returned to England after World War II he remained in Australia. He graduated with a Bachelor of Arts degree with Honours in History from the University of Melbourne in 1946, where he resided at Queen's College. He met Betty, whom he married, at the university. They built a mud brick house at Eltham, Victoria. The family home from 1967-2013 was 148 Nicholson Street, Fitzroy (sold, 2013). He later attended the University of Sydney and the University of California, Los Angeles.

Burstall originally wanted to be a novelist and thought that if he worked in film it might be a way to move into writing. He went to work for the National Film Library with a view to getting a job at the Commonwealth Film Unit as a scriptwriter. He worked on a series of documentaries, editing and writing for the Antarctic Division. He became interested in film making after seeing 1953 French film White Mane at the Melbourne International Film Festival.

He and Patrick Ryan established Eltham Films in 1959.

In February 2012 sections of Burstall's personal journals from 1953–1955 were published by Melbourne University Press, under the title Memoirs of a Young Bastard.

== Early career ==
Burstall's first film was a black-and-white short, The Prize. With photography by Gérard Vandenberg, The Prize won a bronze at the 1960 Venice Film Festival. Burstall's two young sons had acting roles.

Working with David Bilcock, Dusan Marek, Giorgio Mangiamele, Gérard Vandenburg, Alan Harkness and composer George Dreyfus, Eltham Films made many short subjects, including acclaimed documentaries on Australian art, and early children's puppet series Sebastian the Fox. The latter first screened on the ABC in 1962-63, and Burstall later described the title character as "one of the first recessive Oz heroes".

From 1965 to 67 Burstall was in the United States on a Harkness Fellowship. He studied scriptwriting with Paddy Chayefsky, directing with Martin Ritt, and acting with Lee Strasberg and the Actors Studio in New York.

== La Mama Theatre ==
One of the results of the trip was the founding by Burstall's wife, Betty, of La Mama Theatre, in the Melbourne suburb of Carlton. La Mama opened on 30 July 1967, modelled on the "off-off-Broadway" theatre of the same name in New York City.

== After America ==
Burstall wrote and directed the 1969 feature 2000 Weeks. A commercial failure, savaged by the critics, the film's poor reception would lead Burstall to move to more populist works with his next films, Stork and sex comedy Alvin Purple. The film's failure also influenced Bruce Beresford and Phillip Adams to move in a more populist direction when they came to make early Australian hit The Adventures of Barry McKenzie in 1972.

Burstall then formed a new company with Pat Ryan, David Bilcock and Rob Copping, Bilock and Copping with the view to making commercials to fund features. He looked at making a film called Filth and had money to develop it, but decided to make Stork instead.

== Stork and David Williamson ==
Stork appeared in 1971, and proved a moderate commercial success. Stork won multiple Australian Film Institute awards, including best narrative feature, best director and best actor.

After the breakout success of Alvin Purple, Burstall would later return to work with Williamson on three further films: social drama Petersen (1974), which was seen in England and the United States (for which Stanley Kubrick praised Burstall for his direction and Jack Thompson for his acting), big-budget romp Eliza Fraser (1976) and Duet for Four (1982), the tale of a mid-life crisis. Burstall has argued that Eliza Fraser was made for an increased budget after Roadshow insisted on overseas stars; Susannah York played Eliza, and the cast also included Trevor Howard.

== Alvin Purple ==
After forming Hexagon Productions, Burstall directed, produced and co-wrote (with Alan Hopgood) his next feature, sex comedy Alvin Purple (1973). The film was released in some territories as The Sex Therapist. Burstall estimated that he made $120,000 from Alvin Purple. The film spawned a successful sequel which Burstall co-wrote. Later Hexagon films performed less well at the box office. In 1980 Burstall made a film for another company when he took over war movie Attack Force Z after Phillip Noyce had creative disagreements with the producers just before filming was due to begin.

== Television ==
Burstall directed episodes of series including Special Squad, Return to Eden II, The Man from Snowy River and Water Rats. His miniseries Great Expectations: The Untold Story was the first co-production between an independent filmmaker and ABC TV.

== Recognition and achievements ==
Burstall won a number of Australian Film Institute awards for his work, including best director for Stork (which also won the grand prize) and a best director nomination for his 1976 thriller End Play. His final theatrical feature was an adaptation of DH Lawrence novel Kangaroo in 1986. He was appointed a Member of the Order of Australia (AM) in the Australia Day Honours 1996. His wife Betty had been similarly honoured in 1993.

== Death ==
On the evening of 18 April 2004 Burstall suffered a stroke. He was 76. He was survived by his wife Betty (died 2013) and his sons Dan and Tom.

== Awards and nominations ==
- 1960?: Venice Film Festival. Award for The Prize
- 1969: 6th Moscow International Film Festival - Golden Prize for 2000 Weeks
- 1987: 15th Moscow International Film Festival - Golden Prize for Kangaroo
- 1996: Member of the Order of Australia

== Selected filmography ==
- Sebastian the Fox (1961, director, children's television series)
- Nullarbor Hideout (1964, director, children's feature)
- Hombre (1967, assistant, feature)
- 2000 Weeks (1969, director and scriptwriter, feature film)
- Getting Back to Nothing (1970, director, documentary)
- Stork (1971, director, feature film)
- Libido (1973, director, one part of the four part feature film - "The Child")
- Alvin Purple (1973, director, feature film)
- Petersen (1974, director, feature film)
- Alvin Rides Again (1974, producer and co-writer, feature film)
- End Play (1975, director, feature film)
- Eliza Fraser (1976, director, feature film)
- High Rolling (1977, producer, feature film)
- The Last of the Knucklemen (1979, director, feature film)
- Attack Force Z (1981, director, feature film)
- Duet for Four (1982, director, feature film)
- A Descant for Gossips (1983, director and co-scriptwriter, three-part miniseries)
- The Naked Country (1985, director)
- Kangaroo (1986, director, feature film)
- Great Expectations: The Untold Story (1987, director and scriptwriter, miniseries)
- Nightmare at Bittercreek (1988, director, feature film)
- Water Rats: Dead in the Water (1996, director, telemovie length first episode of Water Rats)

=== Shorts ===
- The Prize (1960)
- Nullarbor Hideout (1964)
- Kropp's Last Tape (1966)
- The Hot Centre of the World (1971)
- Three Old Friends (1974)
- Blues From the Jungle (1977)

=== Documentaries ===
- Australian Art (1960–63) - 13 x 10 minute films
- Painting People (1965)
- Sculpture - Australia (1969)
- Getting Back to Nothing (1970)

=== Unmade Films ===
- Man in Iron (1960) - Burstall's first screenplay, about Ned Kelly - he only managed to raise half the £50,000 budget required
- From the Other Island (early 1960s) - treatment about a juvenile delinquent who escapes from French Island prison
- Filth (1970) - based on an incident involving John Romeril's play Mr Big, The Big Fat Pig
- Pendegast (1974) - meant to follow Alvin Purple, but an Alvin sequel was made instead
