= Don Barker (actor) =

Australian actor

- Born: 1938/1939 (aged 86-88); Adelaide, South Australia, Australia
- Occupation: Actor
- Years active: 1960–2022
- Known for: Homicide; Prisoner
- Notable work: Rabbit-Proof Fence

Don Barker (born 1938/1939) is an Australian former actor and director, who has appeared in films, television, theatre and radio.

Barker is one of the early faces on Australian television known for his role in police procedural Homicide as Detective Sergeant Harry White, and briefly in early episodes of Prisoner (own internatiolly as Prisoner: Cell Block H") as psychologist Bill Jackson, the husband of Meg Jackson (Elspeth Ballantyne).

== Early life ==
Barker was born in Adelaide, South Australia and attended Brighton's Sacred Heart College. At the time, he had not yet developed an interest in acting.

== Career ==
=== Theatre ===
Barker began his career in 1960 in the theatre. His first professional acting role was in Patrick White's The Season at Sarsaparilla in 1963. From 1968 until 1973, he was a member of the former South Australian Theatre Company (now the State Theatre Company of South Australia) and appeared in their productions of The Heiress, The Alchemist, Born Yesterday and David Williamson's Jugglers Three.

In 1977, he founded The Stage Company, together with John Noble, among others. He performed in several of their productions, including Errol Flynn's Great Big Adventure Book for Boys, The Fall Guy, The Sound of Silence, The Death of George Reeves, Gone with Hardy, The Perfectionist, Travelling North, Gulls, The Harlequin Shuffle and Sons of Cain.

He has taken part in over 110 stage productions up until 2008, including as a director.

=== Television and film ===
Barker has also appeared in numerous television series from the late 1960s. He is best known for his role in the police procedural series Homicide as Detective Sergeant Harry White, which he reprised in an episode of Bluey. He replaced George Mallaby as part of the final detective line up. In 1981 he starred as Bill Williams in soap opera The Restless Years.

He had recurring roles in The Sullivans, All the Rivers Run and The New Adventures of Black Beauty, as well as several miniseries including Ben Hall, Against the Wind, The Last Outlaw, I Can Jump Puddles, The Far Country, The Mild Colonial Boy and Sun on the Stubble (aka The Valley Between). He had a recurring guest role in the prison drama Prisoner as psychologist Bill Jackson, reprising the role once more in the 1980 TV movie The Franky Doyle Story. The character was written out after being murdered during a prison riot.

His guest credits include Division 4, Matlock Police, Boney, Ryan, Certain Women, Cop Shop, The Box, Bellamy, Bluey, Chopper Squad, The Flying Doctors, Rafferty's Rules, Mother and Son, A Country Practice, Blue Heelers, McLeod's Daughters and City Homicide.

He has appeared in a number of feature films including murder mystery Weekend of Shadows (1978), sports biopic Dawn! (1979), war drama Gallipoli (1981), alongside Mel Gibson, fantasy drama Playing Beattie Bow (1986) and political satire A Sting in the Tale (1989). He had small parts in action thriller Heaven's Burning (1997), alongside Russell Crowe, horror film Cut (2000), with Molly Ringwald and political drama Black and White (2002) with Robert Carlyle, Colin Friels and Ben Mendelsohn. He also featured in the AFI Award-winning drama Rabbit-Proof Fence (2002), (based on the 1996 book Follow the Rabbit-Proof Fence by Doris Pilkington Garimara), opposite Kenneth Branagh.

Additionally, Barker is well known for his appearances in a number of television commercials, including the 1970s campaign for South Australian-based Coopers Brewery, promoting the stout and lemonade mix known as a portagaf.

== Personal life ==
Barker is an avid South Adelaide Football Club fan in the SANFL.

== Filmography ==
=== Film ===
| Title | Year | Role | Type |
|---|---|---|---|
| 1975 | Solo Flight | | Feature film |
| 1978 | Weekend of Shadows | O'Dowd | Feature film |
| 1979 | Dawn! | Doctor | Biopic |
| 1981 | Gallipoli | N.C.O at Ball | Feature film |
| 1981 | Revenge | | Short film |
| 1984 | Pete's Pigs: A Journey Through an Intensive Piggery | Presenter | Short film |
| 1986 | Fair Game | Frank | Feature film |
| 1986 | Playing Beatie Bow | Samuel Bow | Feature film |
| 1987 | The Time Guardian | Undertaker | Feature film |
| 1987 | From Bulldust to Bitumen | Narrator | Video short |
| 1989 | A Sting in the Tale | Prime Minister | Feature film |
| 1990 | Struck by Lightning | Mr. Jeffries | Feature film |
| 1991 | Sweet Talker | Sgt. Watts | Feature film |
| 1995 | The Life of Harry Dare | Sergeant | Feature film |
| 1997 | Heaven's Burning | Drinker | Feature film |
| 1999 | In a Savage Land | Barman | Feature film |
| 2000 | Cut | Original Producer | Feature film |
| 2002 | Rabbit-Proof Fence | Mr. Paul Evans | Feature film |
| 2002 | Black and White | Ceduna Magistrate | Feature film |
| 2006 | Modern Love | | Feature film |
| 2007 | Lucky Miles | Pub Regular #1 | Feature film |
| 2019 | The Battle for Mr. Jericho | Gerald | Feature film |

=== Television ===
| Title | Year | Role | Type |
|---|---|---|---|
| 1970–1971 | Division 4 | Bill Anderson / Hugo Smith / Stan Robbins | 3 episodes |
| 1971–1972 | Matlock Police | Jimmy Nolan / Maurie Hicks / Sam Gil | 3 episodes |
| 1972 | Boney | Alec Bryce | 1 episode |
| 1973 | Ryan | Steve Roberts | 1 episode |
| 1964–1975 | Certain Women | Norm Coburn | 3 episodes |
| 1967–1976 | Homicide | Det. Sgt. Harry White | 119 episodes |
| 1975 | Ben Hall | Terry Delaney | Miniseries, 2 episodes |
| 1976 | The Box | Johnny Masters | 1 episode |
| 1977 | Bluey | Det. Sgt. Harry White | 1 episode |
| 1977 | The Sullivans | Neville Godway | 8 episodes |
| 1977–1982 | The Restless Years | Bill Williams | 617 episodes |
| 1978 | Chopper Squad | Cliff Jackson | 1 episode |
| 1978 | Against the Wind | Captain Abbott | Miniseries, 4 episodes |
| 1978 | The Sound of Love | Harry Taylor | TV movie |
| 1978–1984 | Cop Shop | Warwick Morgan / Alan Brooks | 7 episodes |
| 1979 | Prisoner | Bill Jackson | 3 episodes |
| 1979 | Taxi | Greg Day | TV movie |
| 1980 | The Franky Doyle Story | Bill Jackson | TV movie |
| 1980 | The Last Outlaw | Publican | Miniseries, 4 episodes |
| 1981 | I Can Jump Puddles | Mr. Tucker | Miniseries, 2 episodes |
| 1981 | Bellamy | Baker | Miniseries, 1 episode |
| 1982 | Holiday Island | Rafferty | 1 episode |
| 1983 | All the Rivers Run | George Blakeny | 5 episodes |
| 1983 | The Fire in the Stone | Harry | TV movie |
| 1985 | Robbery Under Arms | Wilson | TV movie |
| 1986; 1990 | The Flying Doctors | Frank Kent / Rex Sewell | 2 episodes |
| 1987 | The Far Country | Tom Armitage | Miniseries, 2 episodes |
| 1989 | Rafferty's Rules | Frederich Guilda | 1 episode |
| 1990 | Shadows of the Heart | George Farrell | Miniseries, 2 episodes |
| 1990 | Howard, the Mild Colonial Boy | Kevin | Miniseries, 6 episodes |
| 1991 | Eggshells | Jerry Rose | |
| 1991 | The River Kings | Pastor Beckman | Miniseries, 1 episode |
| 1992 | Ultraman: Towards the Future | Johnson | Miniseries, 1 episode |
| 1992 | Mother and Son | Butcher | 1 episode |
| 1992–1993 | The New Adventures of Black Beauty | Dr. Arthur Osbourne | 5 episodes |
| 1993 | A Country Practice | Stan Laski | 2 episodes |
| 1994 | The Battlers | Publican | Miniseries |
| 1996 | Sun on the Stubble | Uncle Gus | Miniseries, 6 episodes |
| 1997; 2006 | Blue Heelers | Jack Buckley / Lorne Coleman | 2 episodes |
| 1999 | Chuck Finn | Mr. Smith | 1 episode |
| 2005 | McLeod's Daughters | Bob MacKenzie | 1 episode |
| 2008 | City Homicide | Christopher Spotswood | 1 episode |

== Theatre ==
=== As actor ===
| Year | Title | Role | Notes |
|---|---|---|---|
| 1960 | The Chiltern Hundreds | | Willard Hall, Adelaide with Therry Dramatic Society |
| 1960 | The Murder Scream / Fumed Oak / A Florentine Tragedy / The Dear Departed | | Willard Hall, Adelaide with Therry Dramatic Society |
| 1961 | The Importance of Being Earnest | | Willard Hall, Adelaide with Therry Dramatic Society |
| 1961 | Antigone | | Willard Hall, Adelaide with Therry Dramatic Society |
| 1961 | Journey's End | | Willard Hall, Adelaide with Therry Dramatic Society |
| 1961 | Hamlet | | Woodville High School, Adelaide with Shakespearean Drama Group |
| 1961 | Someone Waiting | | Willard Hall, Adelaide with Therry Dramatic Society |
| 1962 | The Lady's Not for Burning | | Willard Hall, Adelaide with Therry Dramatic Society |
| 1962 | The Potting Shed | | Willard Hall, Adelaide with Therry Dramatic Society |
| 1962 | You Can't Take It With You | | Willard Hall, Adelaide with Therry Dramatic Society |
| 1962 | Where the Cross is Made | Cross-roads | Willard Hall, Adelaide with Therry Dramatic Society |
| 1962 | The Season at Sarsaparilla | Ron Suddards | Union Hall, Adelaide, Theatre Royal Sydney |
| 1963 | The Playboy of the Western World | | Willard Hall, Adelaide |
| 1964 | The Prisoner | The Interrogator | Willard Hall, Adelaide |
| 1964 | Night on Bald Mountain | Second Hiker | Union Hall, Adelaide |
| 1964 | The Middle Watch | | Willard Hall, Adelaide |
| 1964–1965 | Annual Drama Festival and Production Tourney | The Bet, Novelist | Willard Hall, Adelaide |
| 1965 | Toda-San | | Union Hall, Adelaide |
| 1966 | Jemmy Green in Australia / Off to the Diggings | | Union Hall, Adelaide, Shedley Theatre, Adelaide |
| 1966 | The Affair | | Arts Theatre, Adelaide with Adelaide Repertory Theatre |
| 1967 | LUV | | Sheridan Theatre with Adelaide Theatre Group |
| 1967 | The Homecoming | Joey | Adelaide Teachers College with South Australian Theatre Company |
| 1968 | Burke's Company | | Adelaide Teachers College with South Australian Theatre Company |
| 1968 | The Heiress | Dr Austin Sloper | Adelaide Teachers College with South Australian Theatre Company |
| 1969 | The Audition / The Real Inspector Hound | | Scott Theatre, Adelaide with South Australian Theatre Company |
| 1969 | Pacific Rape | Captain Bligh | Sheridan Theatre with Adelaide Theatre Group |
| 1969 | The Caretaker | | Union Hall, Adelaide with South Australian Theatre Company |
| 1970 | Let's Get a Divorce | | Scott Theatre, Adelaide with South Australian Theatre Company |
| 1970 | Semi-Detached | | Scott Theatre, Adelaide with South Australian Theatre Company |
| 1970 | The Queen and the Rebels | | Scott Theatre, Adelaide & SA tour with South Australian Theatre Company |
| 1970 | And the Big Men Fly | | Scott Theatre, Adelaide with South Australian Theatre Company |
| 1971 | The Boors | Simon, a merchant | Scotch College, Adelaide, Playhouse, Canberra, ANZ Bank, Adelaide with South Australian Theatre Company |
| 1971 | Hadrian VII | | Scott College, Adelaide with South Australian Theatre Company |
| 1971 | Little Murders | | Scott College, Adelaide with South Australian Theatre Company |
| 1971 | The Imaginary Invalid | | Scott College, Adelaide with South Australian Theatre Company |
| 1971 | The Patrick Pearse Motel | | Scott College, Adelaide with South Australian Theatre Company |
| 1971 | Robin and Marion | The Horse/Wolf / A Musician | University of Adelaide |
| 1972 | A Midsummer Night's Dream | | Scotch College, Adelaide with South Australian Theatre Company |
| 1972 | The Playboy of the Western World | | Union Hall, Adelaide with South Australian Theatre Company |
| 1972 | Butley | | Union Hall, Adelaide with South Australian Theatre Company |
| 1972 | Jugglers Three | | Union Hall, Adelaide with South Australian Theatre Company |
| 1973 | A Certified Marriage | | Arts Theatre, Adelaide with South Australian Theatre Company |
| 1977 | Errol Flynn's Great Big Adventure Book for Boys | | Sheridan Theatre, Adelaide with The Stage Company |
| 1978 | Royal | | Royal Adelaide Showgrounds with South Australian Theatre Company |
| 1978 | Richard III | Lord Stanley | Melbourne Athenaeum with MTC |
| 1978 | The Beaux' Stratagem | Bonniface | Melbourne Athenaeum with MTC |
| 1978 | The Fall Guy | | Space Theatre, Adelaide with The Stage Company |
| 1979 | Summer of the Seventeenth Doll | Roo | SA tour with STCSA |
| 1979 | The Sound of Silence | Peter Cutler | Balcony Theatre, Adelaide with The Stage Company |
| 1979 | Baggy Green Skin | | Playhouse, Adelaide with STCSA |
| 1979 | The Death of George Reeves | Announcer / Hotel Manager / Moose Malloy / Big Arthur Harper / Judge Dalton / Robert Condon / William Bliss / Ambulance Person | Space Theatre, Adelaide with The Stage Company |
| 1980 | Errol Flynn's Great Big Adventure Book for Boys | | Space Theatre, Adelaide with The Stage Company |
| 1980 | Gypsy | Uncle Jocko / Herbie | SGIO Theatre, Brisbane with QTC |
| 1980 | Henry IV, Part 1 | Falstaff | University of Newcastle with Hunter Valley Theatre Co |
| 1982 | Brecht on Brecht | | Playhouse, Newcastle with Hunter Valley Theatre Co |
| 1982 | Gone with Hardy | | Playhouse, Adelaide with The Stage Company |
| 1983 | The Perfectionist | | Space Theatre, Adelaide with The Stage Company |
| 1983 | Travelling North | | Space Theatre, Adelaide with The Stage Company |
| 1983 | Gulls | | Space Theatre, Adelaide with The Stage Company |
| 1984 | The Removalists | | Adelaide tour |
| 1985 | The Harlequin Shuffle | | Space Theatre, Adelaide with The Stage Company |
| 1985 | Sons of Cain | | Space Theatre, Adelaide with The Stage Company |
| 1986 | Pravda | Harry Morrison / Mack Wellington / Leander Scroop / Ian Ape-Warden | Playhouse, Adelaide with STCSA |
| 1986 | Wild Honey | Porfiry Semyonovich Glagolyev | Playhouse, Adelaide with STCSA |
| 1987 | Shepherd on the Rocks | Tom Teasdale / Puss / Percy Grice | Playhouse, Adelaide with STCSA |
| 1987 | The Winter's Tale | Antigonus / Lord / Shepherd | Playhouse, Adelaide with STCSA |
| 1987 | Away | Roy / The MC | Playhouse, Adelaide with STCSA |
| 1988 | 1841 | | Playhouse, Adelaide, Sydney Opera House with STCSA |
| 1988 | King Lear | | Playhouse, Adelaide with STCSA |
| 1988 | The Seagull | Shamraev | Playhouse, Adelaide with STCSA |
| 1988 | A Dream Play | Blind Man / Gent / Dean of Law | Playhouse, Adelaide with STCSA |
| 1990 | The Comedy of Errors | | Playhouse, Adelaide with STCSA |
| 1990 | Restoration | Mr Hardache | Playhouse, Adelaide with STCSA |
| 1991 | Julius Caesar | Julius Caesar | Playhouse, Adelaide with STCSA |
| 1991 | Spring Awakening | Rev Baldbelly / Dr Procrustes | Playhouse, Adelaide with STCSA |
| 1991 | The Removalists | Sgt. Don Simmonds | Space Theatre, Adelaide, Wharf Theatre, Sydney with STCSA & STC |
| 1991 | King Golgrutha | Staunch Roman Guard / Sam Penderbroke / Quentin the Archbishop | Playhouse, Adelaide with STCSA |
| 1991–1992 | Money and Friends | Conrad | Australian tour with MTC, STC, QTC & STCSA |
| 1992 | Tears of Blood | | Theatre 62, Adelaide with Bearly Together |
| 1993 | The School for Scandal | Crabtree | Playhouse, Adelaide with STCSA |
| 1993 | Cosi | Henry | Space Theatre, Adelaide with Red Shed & STCSA |
| 1993 | Under Milk Wood | | Playhouse, Adelaide with STCSA |
| 1994 | And the Big Men Fly | J.J. Forbes | Theatre 62, Adelaide |
| 1995 | Haxby's Circus | | Playhouse, Adelaide with STCSA |
| 1996 | Solstice | | The Amphitheatre, Adelaide with Magpie Theatre Co & STCSA |
| 1996 | The Club | Jack Riley | Playhouse, Adelaide, National Theatre, Melbourne, Theatre Royal, Hobart, SA & VIC tour with STCSA |
| 1996 | The Torrents | John Manson | Playhouse, Adelaide with STCSA |
| 1998 | The Department | | Playhouse, Adelaide, Playhouse, Canberra with STCSA |
| 1999 | The Wild Duck | Haakon Werle | Playhouse, Adelaide with STCSA |
| 1999 | Twelfth Night | Sir Toby Belch | Playhouse, Adelaide with STCSA |
| 2000 | Sweet Road | Frankie | Malthouse Theatre, Melbourne, Space Theatre, Adelaide with Playbox Theatre Company & STCSA |
| 2001–2003 | Certified Male | Jarrad | Australian tour with Art Cackle + Hoot |
| 2002 | The Merchant of Venice | Antonio / Old Gobbo | Dunstan Playhouse, Adelaide with STCSA |
| 2004 | Death of a Salesman | Charley | Dunstan Playhouse, Adelaide with STCSA |
| 2005 | The Government Inspector | Mayor | Dunstan Playhouse, Adelaide with STCSA |
| 2006 | Uncle Vanya | Serebryakov | Dunstan Playhouse, Adelaide with STCSA |
| 2007 | The Homecoming | | Holden St Theatres, Adelaide |
| 2008 | The Cripple of Inishmaan | Doctor | Dunstan Playhouse, Adelaide with STCSA |

=== As director ===
| Year | Title | Role | Notes |
|---|---|---|---|
| 1962 | Peter Pan and the Carnival Apprentice | Director / Producer | Willard Hall, Adelaide with Therry Dramatic Society |
| 1963 | The House by the Lake | Director | Willard Hall, Adelaide with Therry Dramatic Society |
| 1966 | The Tower | Director | Willard Hall, Adelaide with Therry Dramatic Society |
| 1967 | The Milk Train Doesn't Stop Here Anymore | Director | Union Hall, Adelaide |
| 1970 | Frisch-Grass: Two Modern European Comedies | Director | Union Hall, Adelaide with South Australian Theatre Company |
| 1978 | Cheapside | Director | Adelaide tour with The Stage Company |
| 1984 | Translations | Director | Space Theatre, Adelaide |
| 1993 | The Heiress | Director | Royalty Theatre, Adelaide with Therry Dramatic Society |
| 1994 | Bondage | Director | Theatre 62, Adelaide |
| 1994 | We've Got a Tent | Director | University of Adelaide |
| 2005 | Bondage | Director | Holden St Theatres, Adelaide |

== Radio ==
| Year | Title | Role | Notes |
|---|---|---|---|
| 1979 | Britannicus | | ABC Radio Adelaide |
| 1979 | Pope Joan Lives | | ABC Radio Adelaide |
| 1979 | The Head Hunters | | ABC Radio Adelaide |

== Audiobook narration ==
| Year | Title | Role | Notes |
|---|---|---|---|
| 2013 | I Can Jump Puddles by Alan Marshall | Narrator | |
| 2013 | My Story by General Peter Cosgrove | Narrator | |
| 2013 | Henry Lawson by Henry Lawson | Narrator | |
| 2014 | Snugglepot and Cuddlepie by May Gibbs | Narrator | |
| 2022 | What I cook when nobody's watching by Poh Ling Yeow | Narrator | |

== Awards ==
| Year | Work | Award | Category | Result |
|---|---|---|---|---|
| 1980 | Henry IV, Part 1 | 2nd Conda Awards | Best Actor in a Leading Role | Won |
| 2008 | The Homecoming | Adelaide Theatre Guide Curtain Call Awards | Best Male Performance | Won |
| 2012 | Don Barker | Adelaide Critics Circle | Lifetime Achievement Award | Won |
