= Edwin Hodgeman =

Australian actor (born 1935)

- Born: 26 June 1935 (age 91); Adelaide, South Australia, Australia
- Occupation: Actor

Edwin Hodgeman (born 26 June 1935) is an Australian actor, known for playing Dr Dealgood in Mad Max Beyond Thunderdome in 1985.

== Early life ==
Edwin 'Teddy' Hodgeman was born in 1935 in Alberton, a suburb of Adelaide, South Australia. He studied at Sydney's National Institute of Dramatic Art (NIDA), graduating as one of the first intake of students in 1960.

== Career ==
Hodgeman began his career in the 1950s, being mentored by pioneer Adelaide theatre director Colin Ballantyne. He moved to Canada to work with Stratford Ontario Company, before returning to Adelaide in 1965 to perform as part of the fledgling South Australian Theatre Company.

Under George Ogilvie, the first artistic director of the company, Hodgeman became a leading stage actor from 1969, in everything from Shakespeare to musical theatre and cabaret. He starred alongside the likes of Don Barker, Dennis Olsen, Helmut Bakaitis, Vivienne Garrett, Paul Blackwell. Hodgeman also won acclaim for stage appearances interstate. He is well known for originating the role of Ahmed in Jim Sharman's Sydney production of Norm and Ahmed in 1968.

In 1985, Hodgeman landed the role of Dr Dealgood in post-apocalyptic action film Mad Max Beyond Thunderdome, the third installment of the Mad Max franchise, alongside Mel Gibson and Tina Turner.

Hodgeman's other film credits include The Fourth Wish (1976), Money Movers (1978), The Survivor (1981), Robbery Under Arms (1985), A Sting in the Tale (1989), Shine (1996), Human Touch (2004), Look Both Ways (2005) and Modern Love (2006). He appeared in several miniseries including Eureka Stockade (1984), Sun on the Stubble (1996) and Rain Shadow (2007).

Hodgeman was honoured with an Adelaide Critics Circle lifetime achievement award in 2006.

== Filmography ==
=== Film ===
Year	Title	Role	Notes	Ref.
1976	The Fourth Wish	Simms		
1976	Democracy		Short film	
1977	Novelty Man		Short film	
1978	Money Movers	Nacker		
1979	Labyrinth		Short film	
1981	The Survivor	Bain		
1985	Mad Max Beyond Thunderdome	Dr. Dealgood		
1986	Playing Beatie Bow	Sir		
1989	A Sting in the Tale	Roger Monroe		
1990	Call Me Mr. Brown	Bill Harding		
1994	Ebbtide	Doctor		
1996	Shine	Soviet Society Secretary		
1999	In a Savage Land	Publicist		
1999	The Book Keeper	The Book Keeper (voice)	Short film	
2000	Cut	Mr. Drivett		
2002	Black and White	Govt. Prosecutor		
2004	Human Touch	Mr. Thompson		
2005	Look Both Ways	Jim		
2006	Modern Love	Old Man in motel		
2007	Lucky Miles	Coote		
2007	Twin Rivers	Old William (voice)		
2008	Hey, Hey, It's Esther Blueburger	Rabbi		
2011	Codgers	Les Weston		
2013	Tracks	Mr. Ward		
2022	Finding Sergeant	Hank	Short film	

=== Television ===
Year	Title	Role	Notes	Ref.
1967	Love and War		Episode: O'Flaherty, VC	
1973	Matlock Police	Paddy Hayes / Mr Lane	2 episodes	
1973	Homicide	Tom Pike	1 episode	
1973–1975	Division 4	Doctor / Geoff Walsh / Jim Russell	3 episodes	
1978	Cop Shop	Ralph Chambers	3 episodes	
1982	Sara Dane	Governor King	Miniseries, 2 episodes	
1984	Eureka Stockade	Commissioner Rede	Miniseries, 2 episodes	
1985	Robbery Under Arms	Jack Benson	TV movie	
1988	The Clean Machine	Max Newell	TV movie	
1988	True Believers	Radio Actor	Miniseries, 2 episodes	
1989	Cassidy	Loomis	Miniseries, 2 episodes	
1989	A Country Practice	Francesco Giannini	2 episodes	
1990	Shadows of the Heart	Edward Bennett	2 episodes	
1991	Golden Fiddles	Abenisi	Miniseries, 2 episodes	
1990–1992	Ultraman: Towards the Future	Voice	Animated series, 3 episodes	
1992	Tracks of Glory	Journalist 1	Miniseries, 2 episodes	
1992–1993	The New Adventures of Black Beauty	Potch	20 episodes	
1996	Sun on the Stubble	Mr Taylor	Miniseries, 1 episode	
2007	Rain Shadow	Steve Willis	Miniseries, 6 episodes	
2015	Deadline Gallipoli	Stage Hand	Miniseries, 1 episode	
2016	The Kettering Incident	Billy 'Pop' Sullivan	5 episodes	

== Theatre ==
Year	Title	Role	Notes	Ref.
1951	As You Like It	Lord / Forrester	Tivoli Theatre, Adelaide	
1953	Colombe		Stow Hall, Adelaide with Adelaide Theatre Group	
1954	The Rivals		Stow Hall, Adelaide with Adelaide Theatre Group	
1954	Dark of the Moon	John	Stow Hall, Adelaide with Theatres Associated	
1954	The Insect Play		Studio Theatre, Adelaide	
1955	Governor Bligh: A Comedy of Morals		Studio Theatre, Adelaide with Company of Players	
1955	The Administrator		Studio Theatre, Adelaide with Company of Players	
1955	Papinian	The Emperor Caesar Marcus / Aurelius Antoninus / Augustus Pontifex Maximus	Studio Theatre, Adelaide with Company of Players	
1956	Faust		Studio Theatre, Adelaide with Adelaide Theatre Group	
1956	A Midsummer Night’s Dream		University of Adelaide	
1957	The Dragon and the Dove		University of Adelaide	
1957	An Italian Straw Hat		Willard Hall, Adelaide with Adelaide Theatre Group	
1958	The Sun in Servitude		Willard Hall, Adelaide with Adelaide Theatre Group	
1958	Waiting for Godot		Willard Hall, Adelaide with Adelaide Theatre Group	
1958	The Crucible	Assistant Stage Manager	Willard Hall, Adelaide with Adelaide Theatre Group	
1958	Twisted Faces		Willard Hall, Adelaide with Independent Repertory Incorporated	
1959	Our Town	Professor Willard	UNSW, Sydney with NIDA	
1959	The Caine Mutiny Court-Martial	Lieutenant Commissioner Philip Francis Queeg (First Cast)	UNSW, Sydney with NIDA	
1959	Julius Caesar	Citizens, soldiers, messengers, senators etc	Elizabethan Theatre, Sydney with NIDA	
1960	The Beautiful People	William Prim	UNSW, Sydney with NIDA	
1960	Shadow of Penelope	Telegram Boy	UNSW, Sydney with NIDA	
1960	Love's Labour's Lost	Lord Berowne	UNSW, Sydney with NIDA	
1960	Moon on a Rainbow Shawl		University of Adelaide	
1960	The Green Pastures	Mr. Deshee / Fourth Gambler / Isaac / High Priest	The New Auditorium at NIDA	
1962	Volpone, or The Fox	Mosca	Freemasons Hall, Adelaide for Adelaide Festival of the Arts	
1962	The Taming of the Shrew	Groom / Gregory / Ensemble	Festival Theatre, Stratford, Canada for Stratford Festival	
1962	The Tempest	Mariner / Lord / Monkey / Attendant	Festival Theatre, Stratford, Canada for Stratford Festival	
1962	Macbeth	Ensemble	Festival Theatre, Stratford, Canada for Stratford Festival	
1962–1963	Cyrano de Bergerac	Cadet	Festival Theatre, Stratford, Canada for Stratford Festival	
1963	Timon of Athens	Ventidius	Festival Theatre, Stratford, Canada for Stratford Festival	
1963	Troilus and Cressida	Servant to Paris	Festival Theatre, Stratford, Canada for Stratford Festival	
1963	The Comedy of Errors	Punchinello	Festival Theatre, Stratford, Canada for Stratford Festival	
1964	King Lear	Ensemble	Festival Theatre, Stratford, Canada for Stratford Festival	
1964	Richard II	Exton's Man	Festival Theatre, Stratford, Canada for Stratford Festival	
1964	Le Bourgeois gentilhomme	Dancer	Festival Theatre, Stratford, Canada for Stratford Festival	
1964	The Country Wife	A Servant	Festival Theatre, Stratford, Canada for Stratford Festival	
1965	The Representative		University of Adelaide, Shedley Theatre, Adelaide with SATC	
1966	Sound and Image 66	Narrator	Prince Alfred College, Adelaide	
1966	Romeo and Juliet	Tybalt	Marian St Theatre, Sydney	
1967	The Imaginary Invalid		UNSW Old Tote Theatre, Sydney	
1967	The School for Scandal		UNSW Old Tote Theatre, Sydney	
1967	Hedda Gabler		UNSW Old Tote Theatre, Sydney	
1967	The Royal Hunt of the Sun	Pedro de Candia	New Fortune Theatre, Perth with AETT	
1967–1968	The Beaux' Stratagem	Chaplain Foigard	UNSW Old Tote Theatre, Sydney with NIDA	
1968	The Dumb Waiter		AMP Theatrette, Sydney with Q Theatre	
1968	The Inspector General	Hlestakov	Prince Alfred College, Adelaide	
1968	Norm and Ahmed	Ahmed	UNSW Old Tote Theatre, Sydney	
1968	The Memorandum	Ferdinand Pillar	UNSW, Sydney with NIDA	
1968	The Old Bachelor		Marian St Theatre, Sydney	
1968	Cannonade of Bells		Marian St Theatre, Sydney	
1969	Loot		University of Adelaide with SATC	
1969	Exit the King		University of Adelaide with SATC	
1969	The Caretaker		University of Adelaide with SATC	
1969	The Audition / The Real Inspector Hound		University of Adelaide & SA tour with SATC	
1969	Pacific Rape	Guide One	Sheridan Theatre, Adelaide with Adelaide Theatre Group	
1970	Let's Get a Divorce		University of Adelaide with SATC	
1970	Semi-Detached		University of Adelaide with SATC	
1970	And the Big Men Fly		University of Adelaide with SATC	
1970	The Master Builder		University of Adelaide with SATC	
1970	The Queen and the Rebels		SA tour with SATC	
1971	The Boors	Lunardo – A merchant	SA / WA / ACT tour with SATC	
1971	Hadrian VII		University of Adelaide with SATC	
1971	Little Murders		University of Adelaide with SATC	
1971	Adelaide Happening		University of Adelaide with SATC	
1971	The Imaginary Invalid		University of Adelaide with SATC	
1971	The Philanthropist		Arts Theatre, Adelaide with SATC	
1971	Kean		Arts Theatre, Adelaide with SATC	
1971	Born Yesterday		Arts Theatre, Adelaide with SATC	
1971	The Great Bolyavski	The Voice of Maurice Schwarz	SA tour with SATC	
1972	A Midsummer Night’s Dream		Scotch College, Adelaide with SATC	
1972	The Alchemist		University of Adelaide with SATC	
1972	The Legend of King O'Malley	King O’Malley	Civic Theatre, Fiji, Mercury Theatre, Auckland, Star Boating Club, Wellington with UNSW Old Tote Theatre Company	
1972	The Old Familiar Juice		Russell St Theatre, Melbourne with MTC	
1972	Sticks and Bones		Russell St Theatre, Melbourne with MTC	
1972	A Touch of the Poet		Russell St Theatre, Melbourne with MTC	
1972	The Tavern		Russell St Theatre, Melbourne with MTC	
1972–1973	Jugglers Three		Russell St Theatre, Melbourne, Playbox Theatre, Melbourne with MTC	
1973	Batman's Beach-Head		Comedy Theatre, Melbourne with J. C. Williamson's & MTC	
1973–1974	The Play’s the Thing		St Martins Theatre, Melbourne, Playhouse, Canberra with MTC	
1974	Pericles, Prince of Tyre		Russell St Theatre, Melbourne with MTC	
1974	Coralie Lansdowne Says No		Russell St Theatre, Melbourne with MTC	
1974	The Doctor's Dilemma		St Martins Theatre, Melbourne with MTC	
1974–1975	Equus		Russell St Theatre, Melbourne, Playhouse, Adelaide with MTC	
1975	When Voyaging		Playhouse, Adelaide with SATC	
1976	Coriolanus		Playhouse, Adelaide with SATC	
1976	Major Barbara	Adolphus Cusins	Playhouse, Adelaide with SATC	
1976	Happy Landings		Playhouse, Adelaide with SATC	
1976	Otherwise Engaged	Simon Hench	Space Theatre, Adelaide with SATC	
1976	The Last of the Knucklemen	Methuselah	SA tour with SATC	
1977	The School for Scandal		Playhouse, Adelaide with SATC	
1977	The Cherry Orchard		Playhouse, Adelaide with SATC	
1977	All My Sons	Dr Jim Bayliss	Playhouse, Adelaide with SATC	
1977	Too Early To Say: A Place in the Present	Max Stanton	Playhouse, Adelaide with SATC	
1977	Annie Get Your Gun	Charlie Davenport	Playhouse, Adelaide with SATC	
1977	Macbeth	Macbeth	Playhouse, Adelaide with SATC	
1977	A Happy and Holy Occasion		Playhouse, Adelaide with SATC	
1977	The Right Man	Jim McNab	Theatre 62, Adelaide with SATC	
1978	Oedipus the King / Oedipus at Colonus		Playhouse, Adelaide with SATC	
1978	Echoes		SA tour with SATC	
1978	Cedoona		SA tour with SATC	
1978	The Beaux' Stratagem	Scrub	Melbourne Athenaeum with MTC	
1978	The Playboy of the Western World	Christopher Mahon	Melbourne Athenaeum with MTC	
1978	The Resistible Rise of Arturo Ui	Arturo Ui	Melbourne Athenaeum with MTC	
1979	Hamlet		Playhouse, Adelaide with STCSA	
1979	American Buffalo	Donny Dubrow	Playhouse, Adelaide with STCSA	
1979	The Shaughraun	Harvey Duff	Playhouse, Adelaide with STCSA	
1979	Oh What a Lovely War, Mate!		Playhouse, Adelaide with STCSA	
1979	The Matchmaker		Playhouse, Adelaide with STCSA	
1979	Last Day in Woolloomooloo	China O'Brien	Playhouse, Adelaide with STCSA	
1979–1980	Twelfth Night	Feste	Playhouse, Adelaide with STCSA	
1980	The Ships Whistle	Frank Norman Trelawny Nottage – Photographer	Playhouse, Adelaide with STCSA	
1980	King Stag		Playhouse, Adelaide with STCSA	
1980	The Three Sisters	Fyodor Kulygin	Playhouse, Adelaide with STCSA	
1980	The Float	Douggie Brand	Playhouse, Adelaide with STCSA	
1980	On the Wallaby	Des	Playhouse, Adelaide with STCSA	
1980	The Man from Mukinupin	Eek Perkins / Zeek Perkins	Playhouse, Adelaide with STCSA	
1981	A Hard God	Dan	Playhouse, Adelaide with STCSA	
1981	A Christmas Carol	Marley's Ghost	Opera Theatre, Adelaide	
1981	A Man for All Seasons	Thomas More	Melbourne Athenaeum with MTC	
1981	The London Cuckolds	Mr Ramble	Melbourne Athenaeum with MTC	
1982	Minna Von Barnhelm	Sergeant Paul Werner	Melbourne Athenaeum with MTC	
1982	As You Like It	Jacques	Melbourne Athenaeum with MTC	
1982	Godsend	Father Danny Quinn	Melbourne Athenaeum with MTC	
1982	The Changeling		Universal Theatre, Melbourne with MTC	
1982	Translations	Hugh	Russell St Theatre, Melbourne with MTC	
1983	84 Charing Cross Road		Russell St Theatre, Melbourne with MTC	
1983	The Mikado	Ko-Ko	Monash University, Melbourne, Orange Civic Theatre, Canberra Theatre with Melbourne Music Theatre	
1983	The Gondoliers	The Duke of Plaza-Toro	Monash University, Melbourne with Melbourne Music Theatre	
1983	Three Sisters	Baron Nikolay Lvovich Tuzenbach	Melbourne Athenaeum with MTC	
1983	The Winter's Tale		Melbourne Athenaeum with MTC	
1983	The Maid's Tragedy	Lysippus	Melbourne Athenaeum with MTC	
1984	Middle-Age Spread	Reg	Playhouse, Adelaide with The Stage Company	
1984	The Lady from the Sea	Ballested	Playhouse, Adelaide with STCSA	
1984	Romeo and Juliet		Playhouse, Adelaide with STCSA	
1984	The Time is Not Yet Ripe	John K. Hill	Playhouse, Adelaide with STCSA	
1985	Down an Alley Filled With Cats	Simon Mathews	Space Theatre, Adelaide with The Stage Company	
1985	Sons of Cain		Space Theatre, Adelaide with The Stage Company	
1986	She Stoops to Conquer	Dick Muggins/Diggory	York Theatre, Sydney with Nimrod	
1986	All's Well That Ends Well	Parolles	York Theatre, Sydney with Nimrod	
1987	Tartuffe		York Theatre, Sydney with Nimrod	
1987	The Winter's Tale		York Theatre, Sydney, Seymour Centre, Sydney with Nimrod	
1987	The Golden Age		Seymour Centre, Sydney with Nimrod	
1987	Away		Townsville Civic Hall with New Moon Theatre Company	
1988	A Dream Play	Glazier / Schoolteacher	Playhouse, Adelaide, Sydney Opera House with STCSA	
1988	Absurd Person Singular		Playhouse, Adelaide with STCSA	
1988	The Seagull	Sorin	Playhouse, Adelaide with STCSA	
1989	The Tempest		Playhouse, Adelaide with STCSA	
1989	Ring Round the Moon		Playhouse, Adelaide with STCSA	
1990	Big River: The Adventures of Huckleberry Finn		Festival Theatre, Adelaide with The Gordon Frost Organisation & Essington Entertainment	
1990	Amadeus	Antonio Salieri	Odeon Theatre, Adelaide	
1990	The Zoo Story	Director	Sheridan Theatre, Adelaide	
1990–1991	A Delicate Balance	Harry	Playhouse, Adelaide with STCSA	
1990–1992	Shadow and Splendour	Inspector Shimura	Suncorp Theatre, Brisbane with QTC, Playhouse, Adelaide with STCSA,	
1991	Julius Caesar	Caius Cassius	Playhouse, Adelaide with STCSA	
1991	Spring Awakening	Headmaster Sunstroke / Dr Lemonade	Playhouse, Adelaide with STCSA	
1991	King Golgrutha	Hunchback	Playhouse, Adelaide with STCSA	
1991	A Flea in Her Ear	Tournel	Playhouse, Adelaide with STCSA	
1991	Cabaret	Herr Schultz	Playhouse, Adelaide with STCSA	
1992	A Midsummer Night's Dream		Playhouse, Adelaide with STCSA	
1992	'Tis Pity She's a Whore		Playhouse, Adelaide with STCSA	
1993	The School for Scandal	Sir Oliver Surface	Playhouse, Adelaide with STCSA	
1993	Under Milk Wood		Playhouse, Adelaide with STCSA	
1993	Sex Diary of an Infidel		Lion Theatre, Adelaide with STCSA	
1993–1995	Me and My Girl	Herbert Patchester	Australia / NZ tour	
1994	Crow		Playhouse, Adelaide, Playhouse, Perth with STCSA	
1995	The Floating World		Subiaco Theatre, Perth with Black Swan State Theatre Company, Playhouse, Adelaide with STCSA	
1996–1997	The Tragedy of Julius Caesar	Caius Cassius	Playhouse, Melbourne with MTC, Suncorp Theatre, Brisbane with QTC	
1996–1997	The Torrents		Playhouse, Adelaide with STCSA	
1996–1997	The Fire on the Snow	Wilson	Playhouse, Adelaide with STCSA	
1996–1997	The Venetian Twins		Playhouse, Adelaide with STCSA	
1998	The Architect's Walk		Arts Theatre, Adelaide with Red Shed Company	
1998	Henry 4	Earl of Worcester / Justice Shallow / Traveller 1 / Drawer 1	Australian tour with Bell Shakespeare	
1999	The Wild Duck	Old Ekdal	Playhouse, Adelaide with STCSA, Glen St Theatre, Sydney with Pork Chop Productions	
2000; 2002	The Taming of the Shrew	A company of players / Baptista / Haberdasher / Vincentio / Gremio	Playhouse, Adelaide with STCSA, Albury Convention and Performing Arts Centre	
2000–2001	Much Ado About Nothing		Capital Theatre, Bendigo, IMB Theatre, Wollongong with Bell Shakespeare	
2001	Quartet		Marian St Theatre, Sydney	
2001	The Tempest	Gonzalo	Glen St Theatre, Sydney with Bell Shakespeare	
2003	The Crucible	Giles Corey	Dunstan Playhouse, Adelaide with STCSA	
2004	Death of a Salesman	Uncle Ben	Dunstan Playhouse, Adelaide with STCSA	
2005	Influence	Marko Blasko	Australian tour with STC, MTC & STCSA	
2008–2011	Codgers	Les Weston	Adelaide Festival Centre for Adelaide Festival	
2009	The Hypochondriac		Space Theatre, Adelaide	
2011	Three Sisters	Ferapont	Dunstan Playhouse, Adelaide with STCSA	
2012	I Am Not An Animal		Adelaide Zoo	
2015	Volpone (or The Fox	Corbaccio	Dunstan Playhouse, Adelaide with STCSA	
2020	Bill		Online (due to COVID-19)	
2020	Barry		Online (due to COVID-19)	

== Radio ==
Year	Title	Role	Notes	Ref.
1979	Saint's Day		ABC Radio Adelaide	
1979	The Unmannering		ABC Radio Adelaide	
