= List of Australian films of 1971 =

== 1971 ==
Title	Director	Cast	Genre	Notes
And the Word Was Made Flesh	Dusan Marek	Jan Cernohous, Jo Van Dalen, John Kirk, Christine Pearce, David Stocker		IMDb
Bello, onesto, emigrato Australia sposerebbe compaesana illibata Girl in Australia	Luigi Zampa	Alberto Sordi, Claudia Cardinale	Comedy	IMDb
Bonjour Balwyn	Nigel Buesst	John Duigan, Peter Cummins, John Romeril, Patricia Condon, Barbara Stephens, Reg Newson, Marcel Cugola, Jim Nicholas, Alan Finney	Comedy	IMDb
A City's Child	Brian Kavanagh	Monica Maughan, Sean Scully, Moira Carleton, Vivean Gray	Drama Feature film	
Country Town	Peter Maxwell	Terry McDermott, Gary Gray, Lynette Curran, Gerard Maguire, Mark Albiston, Carl Bleazby, Carmel Millhouse, Margaret Cruickshank, Dorothy Bradley, Gerda Nicolson, Maurie Fields, Rosie Sturgess, Moira Carleton, Sheila Florance, Stella Lamond, Gabrielle Hartley, Anne Charleston	Drama Feature film	IMDb Based on ABC TV series Bellbird
Demonstrator	Warwick Freeman	Joe James, Gerard Maguire, Irene Inescort, Kenneth Tsang, Wendy Lingham, Slim de Grey, Harold Hopkins, Elizabeth Hall, Stewart Ginn, Paul Karo, Michael Long, Noel Ferrier	Drama Feature film	IMDb
The Girl on the Roof				IMDb
Homesdale	Peter Weir	Geoff Malone, Grahame Bond, Kate Fitzpatrick	Comedy Feature Short film	AFI winner for Best Film. IMDb
The Jumping Jeweller of Lavender Bay				IMDb
Morning of the Earth	Albert Falzon	Stephen Cooney, Terry Fitzgerald, Barry Kanaiaupuni, Gerry Lopez, Michael Peterson, Nat Young		IMDb
Nickel Queen	John McCallum	Googie Withers, John Laws, Alfred Sandor, Ed Devereaux, Peter Gwynne, Tom Oliver, Joanna McCallum, Sir David Brand, Charles Court, Arthur Griffith	Comedy Feature film	IMDb
Out They Go				IMDb
The Passionate Industry				IMDb
Roof Needs Mowing				IMDb
Sacrifice	Keith Salvat	Belinda Giblin	Short film	
Stockade	Hans Pomeranz	Graham Corry, Michele Fawdon, Rod Mullinar, Sue Hollywood, Charles Thorne, Michael Caton, Max Cullen	Drama Feature film	
Stork	Tim Burstall	Bruce Spence, Graeme Blundell, Jacki Weaver, Sean McEuan, Jan Friedl, Helmut Bakaitis, Peter Cummins, Terry Norris, George Whaley, Max Phipps, Dennis Miller	Comedy Feature film	AFI winner for Best Film. IMDb
Sympathy in Summer	Antony I. Ginnane	Connie Simmons, Vincent Griffith, Tony Horler, Robin Wells, Pam McAlister	Feature Short film	
Violence in the Cinema, Part 1	George Miller	Arthur Dignam, Victoria Anoux, Mallory Pettit, Karl Avis, Stewart McQueen	Short	IMDb
Wake in Fright	Ted Kotcheff	Chips Rafferty, Donald Pleasence, Gary Bond, John Meillon, Sylvia Kay, Jack Thompson, Buster Fiddess, Slim de Grey, Norman Erskine, Dawn Lake, Maggie Dence, Peter Whittle	Drama / Thriller Feature film	Entered into the 1971 Cannes Film Festival. IMDb
Walkabout	Nicolas Roeg	Jenny Agutter, David Gulpilil, John Meillon, Lucien John, Peter Carver, Barry Donnelly, Carlo Manchini, Noeline Brown, John Illingsworth	Adventure Feature film	IMDb aka Outback
What For Marianne?		Kate Sheil, Betty Lucas, John Trenaman, Judy McBurney, Rowena Wallace	Drama TV film	

== See also ==
- 1971 in Australia
