= Diane Craig =

Irish actress (born 1949)

- Born: Diane Mary Craig; 1949 (age 76–77); County Down, Northern Ireland
- Other name: Di Craig
- Education: National Institute of Dramatic Art
- Occupation: Actor
- Years active: 1970–2013
- Known for: Ned Kelly (1970); The Restless Years (1978–1979); E Street (1991–1993); Out of the Blue (2008–2009)
- Spouse: Garry McDonald (m. 13 April 1971)
- Children: 2

Diane Mary Craig (born 1949), sometimes credited as Di Craig, is a Northern Irish-born Australian actress best known for her performances in film and television.

== Early life ==
Craig was born in County Down, Northern Ireland in 1949. Her family relocated to Australia in 1960. She attended the National Institute of Dramatic Arts (NIDA) in Sydney.

== Career ==
=== Film ===
Craig left NIDA after a year, making her debut in 1970 starring in the British Australian feature film Ned Kelly (1970), alongside Mick Jagger – replacing Marianne Faithfull in the role of Maggie Kelly.

Her subsequent film appearances included roles in drama feature The Mango Tree (1977), Double Deal (1981), war film The Highest Honor (1982) and Travelling North (1987) starring Leo McKern and based on the David Williamson play of the same name. She played the lead role of Diane Lane in the 1989 political satire A Sting in the Tale. Her most recent film was the 2009 drama In Her Skin, based on the true story of the murder of 15-year-old Rachel Barber, alongside Guy Pearce, Sam Neill and Miranda Otto.

Additionally, she has appeared in several television films, including drama Roses Bloom Twice (1977), The Newman Shame (1978) starring one-time James Bond, George Lazenby and After Marcuse (1988). She has also featured in American comedy film Traveling Man (1989) alongside John Lithgow, sport biopic Never Tell Me Never (1998) opposite Claudia Karvan and One of the Lucky Ones (2007).

=== Television ===
Craig has also appeared on the small screen in numerous serials, miniseries and telemovies. Early television appearances included recurring roles in Snake Gully with Dad and Dave as Mabel Smith (1972), police drama Division 4 as Jenny Franklin (1973–1975) and sport drama And The Big Men Fly as Lil (1974), based on the Alan Hopgood play of the same name. She played the regular role of Majorie Faber in soap opera Certain Women (from 1975 to 1976), Alison Finlay in police drama Cop Shop and Pamela Summers in period drama The Sullivans (both, from 1978 to 1979).

She is probably best known however, for her long-running roles in the soap operas The Restless Years as Gail Lawrence (from 1978 to 1979), and E Street, replacing actress Penny Cook as main character Dr. Elly Fielding (from 1991 to 1993).

Craig appeared several times in the cult television series Prisoner and played a recurring role in medical soap opera The Young Doctors as Diane Brooke (1980–1981). She had ongoing roles in Home and Away playing Theresa Lynch (1995) and Heartbreak High playing June Dyson (1995–1996). Craig's last long-running role was as Deborah McManus in the 2008 series Out of the Blue.

She has featured in several miniseries including political drama Dead Men Running (1971), crime drama Scales of Justice (1983), historical series All The Rivers Run (1983) alongside Sigrid Thornton and based on the book of the same name, True Believers (1988), underworld crime drama Underbelly: A Tale of Two Cities (2009) and media drama Howzat! Kerry Packer's War (2012).

Craig has also made guest appearances on numerous television series, including The Godfathers, Matlock Police, Homicide, Boney, Ryan, Young Ramsay, Bellamy, Holiday Island, A Country Practice, Chopper Squad, Skyways, Carson's Law, Special Squad, The Henderson Kids, Willing and Abel, Mother and Son (alongside husband Garry McDonald), Rafferty's Rules, the 1980s reboot of Mission: Impossible, Acropolis Now, The Flying Doctors, Law of the Land, Medivac, Murder Call, Wildside, All Saints, Packed to the Rafters and Crownies.

=== Theatre ===
Craig has acted on stage in theatre productions, beginning from her time studying at Sydney's NIDA. She has appeared for Nimrod Theatre Company, Griffin Theatre Company, Sydney Theatre Company, Melbourne Theatre Company, Belvoir Street Theatre and Old Tote Theatre Company.

She has featured alongside husband Garry McDonald in several plays, including Let's Get a Divorce (1970), Double Act (1995), Two Brothers (2005) and Don Parties On (2011), the sequel to David Williamson’s Don's Party.

Her most recent appearance was in the Williamson play Crunch Time in 2020.

== Personal life ==
Craig met Garry McDonald when they were cast as husband and wife in a 1970 production of Let’s Get a Divorce at Hobart’s Theatre Royal. They were married on 13 April 1971. They have two grown children, including actor daughter Kate, who played McDonald's character's daughter on Mother and Son. The couple live in Berry on the New South Wales south coast.

== Acting credits ==
=== Film ===
Year	Title	Role	Type
1970	Ned Kelly	Maggie Kelly	Feature film
1970	No Roses for Michael		Short film
1977	The Mango Tree	Miss Pringle	Feature film
1977	The Cowboy		Short film
1978	Road Toll		Short film
1980	And Sometimes I Feel Like I'm Only 18		Short film
1980	The Applicant	Herself (as Di Craig)	Short film
1980	The Tape Recorder		Short film
1981	Double Deal	Miss Stevens	Feature film
1982	The Highest Honor (aka Southern Cross)	Mrs. Page	Feature film
1984	Tell Us in Your Own Words		Short film
1987	Travelling North	Sophie	Feature film
1989	A Sting in the Tale	Diane Lane	Feature film
1998	The Cowboy		Short film
2005	Marti's Party	Trish	Short film
2007	One of the Lucky Ones	Neighbour	Short film
2009	Emergence	Margaret	Short film
2009	In Her Skin	Joy	Feature film
2013	101 Cupcakes	Matilda	Short film

=== Television ===
Year	Title	Role	Type
1971	Dead Men Running	Teresa Doherty	Miniseries, 6 episodes
1971	The Godfathers		1 episode
1971–1974	Matlock Police	Madeleine Reynolds / Christine Anderson / Kate Wilson/Val Hudson	4 episodes
1972	Crisis		TV pilot
1972	Homicide	Trish Langley	Season 9, episode 41: "Change of Heart"
1972	Snake Gully with Dad and Dave	Mabel Smith	8 episodes
1973–1975	Division 4	Jenny Franklin	5 episodes
1973	Boney	Marion	Season 2, episode 4: "Boney and the Powder Trail"
1973	Ryan	Lacey Glen	Episode 29: "A Little Something Special"
1974	And The Big Men Fly	Lil	Miniseries, 6 episodes
1974	This Love Affair		Episode 6: "Seven Tenths of a Second"
1975–1976	Certain Women	Majorie Faber	27 episodes
1977	Hotel Story		1 episode
1977	Roses Bloom Twice	Jenny	TV movie
1977; 1980	Young Ramsay	Tess Cameron / Sara	2 episodes
1978	Chopper Squad	Jenny	Season 2, episode 13: "The Big Trip"
1978	The Newman Shame	Ginger	TV movie
1978–1979	Cop Shop	Alison Finlay	27 episodes
1978–1979	The Restless Years	Gail Lawrence	43 episodes
1978; 1979	The Sullivans	Pamela Summers	28 episodes: #289-291 & #410-434
1979	Mr Squiggle and Friends	Guest Host	1 episode
1979	Skyways	Catherine Tissot	Season 1, episode 83: "Catnip"
1980	Cop Shop	Eve Kadar	2 episodes
1980	The Great Australian Comedy		TV pilot
1980–1981	The Young Doctors	Diane Brooke	7 episodes
1980–1985	Prisoner (aka Prisoner Cell Block H)	Jacki Nolan / Anita Selby / Sarah Forrest	22 episodes
1981	Holiday Island	Marie-Claude	Episode: "Treasure Shop"
1981	Bellamy	Connie	Season 1, episode 17: "A Minor Charge of Murder"
1982	Taurus Rising	Libby Hilton	
1982; 1983; 1987; 1991	A Country Practice	Diane Irving / Deborah Townsend / Carmel Hutchins / Judy Harper	10 episodes
1983	For Love or Money	Herself	Film documentary
1983	Scales of Justice	Meredith	Miniseries, episode 3: "The Numbers"
1983	All The Rivers Run	Dorothy Barrett	Miniseries, episode 1
1984	Carson's Law	Anne Preston	2 episodes
1984	Special Squad		1 episode
1985	The Henderson Kids	Alice Henderson	2 episodes
1987	Have a Go	Guest Judge	3 episodes
1987	Willing and Abel		1 episode
1988	Mother and Son	Delores	Season 4, episode 4: "The Surprise"
1988	True Believers	Elsie	Miniseries, 6 episodes
1988	After Marcuse	Liz	TV movie
1988	Rafferty's Rules		1 episode
1988	Stringer		1 episode
1989	Mission: Impossible	Lady Michelle Faulkner	1 episode: "The Lions"
1989	Travelling Man		TV movie
1989	Chances	Barbara Taylor	TV pilot (never screened on TV)
1989	Living with the Law		1 episode
1990	Family and Friends	Pamela Chandler	
1990	The Flying Doctors	Marion Burgess	Season 7, episode 10: "A Little Tenderness"
1991	Acropolis Now	Miss Joan Wilson	Season 3, episode 6: "The Kid"
1991–1993	E Street	Dr. Elly Fielding	153 episodes
1993	Law of the Land		Season 1, 2 episodes
1994	Love Rules	Host	
1995	This Is Your Life: Garry McDonald	Guest	1 episode
1995	Home and Away	Theresa Lynch	22 episodes
1996	Medivac	Mrs. Flynn	Season 3, episode 8: "Code Purple"
1996–1997	Heartbreak High	June Dyson	24 episodes
1997	Murder Call	Diane Cochrane	Season 1, episode 5: "Who Killed Cock Robin?"
1998	Never Tell Me Never	Shirley Shepherd	TV movie
1998	Wildside	Robyn Stark	2 episodes
1999; 2001	All Saints	Colleen Collins / Sophia Hanrahan	4 episodes
2002; 2015	Australian Story	Herself	2 episodes
2007	One of the Lucky Ones	Neighbour	TV movie
2008–2009	Out of the Blue	Deborah McManus	75 episodes
2009	Underbelly: A Tale of Two Cities	Barbara Mackay	3 episodes
2009	Packed to the Rafters	Marjory	Season 2, episode 5: "Brave New World"
2011	Crownies	Carolyn Fletcher	Season 1, episode 17
2012	Howzat! Kerry Packer's War	Well Dressed Woman at SCG	Miniseries, 1 episode

=== Theatre ===
Year	Title	Role	Type
1968	Our Town	Emily (Act I)	UNSW Old Tote Theatre, Sydney
1968	Hippolytus	Phaedra's attendant	Jane Street Theatre, Sydney with NIDA
1968	Dark of the Moon	Barbara Allen	Jane Street Theatre, Sydney with NIDA
1969	Lock Up Your Daughters	Hillaret (politic's daughter)	NIDA Theatre, Sydney
1969	You Can't Take It With You	Aline	NIDA Theatre, Sydney
1970	Let's Get a Divorce	Cyprienne	National Theatre, Launceston, Devonport Town Hall, Theatre Royal, Hobart with AETT
1970	Ned Kelly		Glenrowan and District Soldiers Memorial Hall, Glenrowan
1971	As You Like It		UNSW Old Tote Theatre, Sydney
1971	The Man of Mode		UNSW Old Tote Theatre, Sydney
1971	A Month in the Country	Celia	UNSW Old Tote Theatre, Sydney, Canberra Theatre with Tasmanian Theatre Company
1972	Bigotry V.C.		Nimrod St Theatre, Sydney (double bill with Housey under season title of On Yer Marx)
1972	Housey		Nimrod St Theatre, Sydney (double bill with Bigotry V.C. under season title of On Yer Marx)
1973	The Philanthropist		Theatre Royal, Hobart
1975	Hobson's Choice	Alice	UNSW Old Tote Theatre, Sydney
1983	The Marginal Farm	Toby	Russell Street Theatre, Melbourne with MTC
1987	Emerald City	Kate	Sydney Opera House with STC
1990	Love Letters	Melissa Gardner	Sydney Opera House
1994	Three Hotels		Ensemble Theatre, Sydney
1994	The Heidi Chronicles		Playhouse, Perth with Perth Theatre Company
1995; 1996	Double Act	Alexandra	Playhouse, Perth, Ford Theatre, Geelong with Perth Theatre Company
1996	Money and Friends		Ensemble Theatre, Sydney, University of Sydney
	Wallflowering		Railway Street Theatre, Penrith
1999	Arms and the Man		Railway Street Theatre, Penrith
1999–2000	Face to Face		Ensemble Theatre, Sydney, Riverside Theatres Parramatta, Playhouse, Canberra, Bruce Gordon Theatre, Wollongong
1999–2000	Scam		Belvoir St Theatre, Sydney & Regal Theatre, Perth with Christine Dunstan Productions
2001	The Women		Q Theatre, Penrith with Railway Street Theatre Company
2001	A Conversation	Barbara Milsom	Ensemble Theatre, Sydney
2002	After the Ball		Ensemble Theatre, Sydney, Theatre Royal Sydney
2003	Wicked Sisters		Monash University, Melbourne, Illawarra Performing Arts Centre with Griffin Theatre Company
2005	Two Brothers	Fiona Benedict	Playhouse, Melbourne, Sydney Opera House, Playhouse, Canberra, Newcastle Civic Theatre, Glen Street Theatre, Sydney, Illawarra Performing Arts Centre with STC & MTC
2011	Don Parties On	Helen	Playhouse, Melbourne, Sydney Theatre with MTC
2013	Rapture, Blister, Burn	Alice	Ensemble Theatre, Sydney
2020	Crunch Time	Helen	Ensemble Theatre, Sydney
