= Barbara Stephens (actress) =

Australian actress

- Occupation: Actress
- Years active: c.1960-2005
- Notable work: Home and Away

Barbara Stephens is an Australian former actress, appearing on film, TV and in the theatre.

== Career ==
Stephens played the lead roles in 1960 TV play The Torrents, 1976 ABC TV comedy series Who Do You Think You Are? (as Kelly) and 1985 film Warming Up (as Juliet). She appeared in the 1972 TV movie adaptation of Dust or Polish? (as Sadie) and the 1980 ABC TV movie adaptation of The Department.

She also played the recurring role of Barbara Stewart (Donald Fisher’s ex-wife and Alf Stewart’s sister) in Home and Away from 1988 to 1989. The character returned in 1996, but was portrayed by a different actress. Stephens reprised the role for a further episode in 2005, as a guest at Alf's 60th birthday party.

Stephens has had a broad theatre career working for many of Australia's major theatre companies including Melbourne Theatre Company, St Martin’s Theatre, Sydney Theatre Company, Theatre Royal Sydney, Jane Street and Nimrod. She also worked extensively in productions for State Theatre Company of South Australia. She appeared in The Real Thing at the Athenaeum Theatre in 1984 and toured with Money and Friends for the Royal Queensland Theatre Company from 1991 to 1992 and in 1993 for the Hunter Valley Theatre Company.

She was also known for playing an air hostess in advertisements for British Airways.

== Filmography ==
=== Film ===
Year	Title	Role	Notes
1971	Bonjour Balwyn	Christine	
1980	Touch and Go	Julie the Head Mistress	
1985	Warming Up	Juliet Cavanagh-Fforbes	
1986	Playing Beatie Bow	Justine Crown	
1994	The Roly Poly Man	Nun	

=== Television ===
Year	Title	Role	Notes
1960	The Torrents	Lead	TV play
1970	The Long Arm	Christine Martin / Miss Bream	2 episodes
1971	Matlock Police	Kathy Curtin / Sheila Robinson	2 episodes
1972	A Nice Day at the Office	Julie Minnott	1 episode
1970–1975	Division 4	Various roles	9 episodes
1972	Dust or Polish?	Sadie	TV movie
1976	Who Do You Think You Are?	Kelly	13 episodes
1978	Because He's My Friend	Meg	TV movie
1978	Run from the Morning	Hilary Pilowski	6 episodes
1978	Black Beauty	Voice	Animated TV movie
1978–1981	Cop Shop	Elspeth Newman / Anne Southby / Lisa Turner	5 episodes
1979	Chopper Squad	Paula	1 episode
1979	Money in the Bank	Maggie	TV movie
1980	The Department		TV movie
1986	Mother and Son	Susan Price	1 episode
1986	Hector's Bunyip	Irene Bailey	TV movie
1983–1993	A Country Practice	Various roles	5 episodes
1988–1989; 2005	Home and Away	Barbara Stewart	35 episodes
1993	G.P.	Wendy Morgan	1 episode
1996	Pacific Drive	Jill Marshall	
1998	Aftershocks	Elaine Gibson	TV movie
2003	White Collar Blue	Edith Franke	1 episode

== Theatre ==
Year	Title	Role	Notes
1968	A Midsummer Night’s Dream		Theatre 62, Adelaide
1968	The Pajama Game		Arts Theatre, Adelaide
1969	The Secretary Bird		Princess Theatre, Melbourne with Harry M. Miller & AET Trust
1969	Out of the Crocodile		St Martins Theatre, Melbourne
1969	The Torrents		ABC Television Studios, Sydney
1970	The Secretary Bird	Molly Forsythe	Canberra Theatre with Harry M. Miller & AET Trust
1971	The Happy Apple		St Martins Theatre, Melbourne
1972	Don’s Party		Jane Street Theatre, Sydney with NIDA & AET Trust
1972	Jugglers Three		Union Hall, Adelaide with STCSA & AET Trust
1973	Measure for Measure		Union Hall, Adelaide with MTC & STCSA
1973	A Certified Marriage		Arts Theatre, Adelaide with MTC & STCSA
1973	Occupations		Arts Theatre, Adelaide with STCSA
1973	Hans Kohlhaas		Union Hall, Adelaide with MTC & STCSA
1973; 1974	The Comedy of Errors		Union Hall, Adelaide, Arts Theatre, Adelaide with MTC & STCSA
1974	The Bride of Gospel Place		Arts Theatre, Adelaide with STCSA
1974	Lola Montez		Arts Theatre, Adelaide
1975	Blithe Spirit		Playhouse, Adelaide with STCSA
1977	Travesties	Cecily Carruthers	Nimrod Theatre, Sydney
1979	The Bed Before Yesterday	Ella	Theatre Royal Sydney
1980; 1981	Celluloid Heroes	Alison Mackay	Nimrod Theatre, Sydney, Theatre Royal Sydney
1981	Every Burglar Has a Silver Lining / La Veniexiana		Seymour Centre, Sydney
1982	The Provok’d Wife	Bellinda	NIDA Parade Theatre, Sydney
1983	There's a Ghost on Clark Island!		Clark Island, Sydney with Nimrod Theatre Company
1984	The Real Thing	Annie	Melbourne Athenaeum with MTC
1984	Candida	Candida	Russell Street Theatre with MTC
1985	Benefactors	Jane	Russell Street Theatre with MTC
1987	A Streetcar Named Desire	Stella Kowalski	Playhouse, Melbourne, Her Majesty's Theatre, Sydney with MTC
1987	Twelfth Night	Olivia	Playhouse, Melbourne with MTC
1987	A Chorus of Disapproval	Hannah Llewellyn	Playhouse, Melbourne, Canberra Theatre with MTC
1987	Wet and Dry	Pam	Russell Street, Melbourne with MTC
1988	A Small Family Business		Northside Theatre, Sydney
1988; 1989	A Month of Sundays	Julia	Marian Street Theatre, Sydney, Playhouse, Adelaide, Cremorne Theatre, Brisbane with Northside Theatre Company
1990	Rumors	Claire Ganz	Comedy Theatre, Melbourne with Gary Penny Productions
1990	Present Laughter	Liz Essendine	Playhouse, Melbourne with MTC
1991	Silence / A Slight Ache		Woollahra Hotel, Sydney with The Lookout Theatre Club
1991	The Hundred Year Ambush		Newtown Theatre, Sydney
1991	Conversation Peace		Wharf Theatre, Sydney with STRUT Theatre
1991–1992	Money and Friends	Margaret	Suncorp Theatre, Brisbane, Sydney Opera House, Playhouse, Melbourne, Playhouse, Adelaide, Canberra Theatre, Playhouse, Newcastle, University of Newcastle
1994	Choice		Newcastle Civic Theatre, Bridge Theatre, Sydney, Q Theatre, Penrith with Riverina Theatre Company, Hunter Valley Theatre Company & Theatre South
1994	Whispering Demons		Playhouse, Perth with Perth Theatre Company
1995	Dead White Males	Jessica Squires	Regional Australian tour, Sydney Opera House, Glen Street Theatre, Sydney, Playhouse, Melbourne, His Majesty's Theatre, Perth, Her Majesty's Theatre, Adelaide, Newcastle Civic Theatre with STC
1996	Livingstone		Marian Street Theatre, Sydney
1997	The Memory of Water		Marian Street Theatre, Sydney with Northside Theatre Company
1998	Complicity		Marian Street Theatre, Sydney
2000	Split Down the Middle	Jenny	Marian Street Theatre, Sydney
2001	God Only Knows		Marian Street Theatre, Sydney with Northside Theatre Company
2001	This Other Eden		Bridge Theatre, Sydney with Theatre South
2002	Hamlet	Gertrude	Bridge Theatre, Sydney, Milton Theatre, Seymour Centre, Sydney, Riverside Theatres Parramatta with Theatre South
2003	A Conversation		Playhouse, Canberra & regional NSW/VIC tour
2003	Wicked Sisters		Monash University, Melbourne, Illawarra Performing Arts Centre with Griffin Theatre Company & Riverina Theatre Company
