= Departmental =

- Australian Theatre Festival episode
- Directed by: Keith Wilkes
- Written by: Mervyn Rutherford
- Original air date: 1980
- Running time: 70 minutes

"Departmental" is a 1980 Australian TV movie based on a play by Mervyn Rutherford. It was part of the ABC's Australian Theatre Festival. Reviews were poor.

== Cast ==
- Ray Barrett
- Martin Vaughan
- Gary Day
- Roderick Williams

== Plot ==
The disappearance of money from a safe in a police station leads to an internal inquiry.
