= Going Home (play) =

Play by Alma De Groen (1976)

Going Home was the first full-length play written by Australian playwright Alma De Groen. A black comedy, it is one of her most well known works. The story concerns the relationship between an Australian artist and his wife, who live in Canada, frustrated with their lives.

It premiered in 1976 by the Melbourne Theatre Company. In 1980, Going Home was filmed by the ABC in a production by Alan Burke and directed by Michael Carson as part of the Australian Theatre Festival. Graeme Blundell and Gary Day starred.

== Productions ==
Going Home
- Based on: Play by Alma De Groen
- Written by: Alma De Groen
- Starring: Richard Meikle
- Country of origin: Australia
- Original language: English

Production
- Producer: Alan Burke

Original release
- Release: 1980

=== Cast of 1980 production ===
- Graeme Blundell as Jim
- Gary Day as Mike
- Tom Falk
- Jill Howard as Zoe
- Carole Skinner as Molly
