= Australian Theatre Festival =

- Country of origin: Australia
- No. of seasons: 2
- No. of episodes: 12

Original release
- Release: 20 July 1980 – 11 November 1981

The Australian Theatre Festival was a series of adaptations of Australian plays filmed by the ABC in 1979-80 and first aired August 1980. Six plays were filmed first the first season at an estimated budget of $5,000 an episode. They aired on Sunday night opposite movies on the commercial channels. Six additional plays were filmed for season two. They were partly inspired by a government ruling that the ABC could keep any money it made selling projects overseas.

The series was not a ratings success.

== Episodes ==
First Series:

1. "Carolie Lansdowne Says No" by Alex Buzo
2. "A Toast to Melba" by Jack Hibberd
3. "Big Toys" by Patrick White
4. "Departmental" by Mervyn Rutherford
5. "The Department" by David Williamson
6. "Bedfellows" by Barry Oakley

Second Series:

1. "Going Home" by Alma De Groen
2. "Rusty Bugles" by Sumner Locke Elliot
3. "A Hard God" by Peter Kenna
