= Dust or Polish? =

1950 book by Norman Lindsay and 1972 Australian film

- First edition
- Author: Norman Lindsay
- Language: English
- Genre: Fiction
- Publisher: Angus & Robertson, Sydney
- Publication date: 1950
- Publication place: Australia
- Media type: Print
- Pages: 205 pp
- Preceded by: Halfway to Anywhere
- Followed by: Rooms and Houses

Dust or Polish? (1950) is a novel by Australian writer and artist Norman Lindsay.

== Story outline ==
The novel tells the story of ex-chorus girl Rita Aanson who goes into the second-hand furniture trade in the Sydney suburb of Paddington.

== Critical reception ==
Reviewing the novel in The Argus Gladys Hain noted a technique of Lindsay's: "Although Norman Lindsay's Dust Or Polish is a quite well-knit story, it will hold the interest rather because of the author's little habit of putting his views on art – and artists – into the mouths of his characters, than because of any intrinsic merit as a literary effort."

In The Sydney Morning Herald, the reviewer was full of praise: "Norman Lindsay's latest novel (his tenth) is a lively, vigorous work sprinkled with the wisdom and keen observations of a mature thinker, and written with the technical skill of an artist. The characters are vitally projected, the narrative flows smoothly and the novel is full of shrewd and thoughtful comments on art, life, manners, morals and, of course, the second-hand and period furniture business that provides an interesting background."

== Television adaptation ==
Dust or Polish?
- Directed by: Julian Pringle
- Written by: Peter Kenna
- Based on: novel by Norman Lindsay
- Produced by: Alan Burke
- Distributed by: ABC
- Release date: October 1972
- Running time: 60 mins
- Country: Australia
- Language: English

The novel was adapted for television in 1972. The television movie was directed by Julian Pringle, from a script by Peter Kenna, and featured Arthur Dignam, Sandy Gore, and Barbara Stephens. The drama was broadcast on the Australian Broadcasting Corporation in October 1972. It was part of a series of adaptations of Norman Lindsay works.

=== Cast ===
- Arthur Dignam
- Sandy Gore as Rita
- Barbara Stephens as Sadie
- Marion Edward as Mrs Dibble
- Kevin Miles as Dr Grimsby

== See also ==
- 1950 in Australian literature
