= Robert Marchand (director) =

Robert Marchand is film director who has worked in England and Australia, notably on TV miniseries.

He also conducts workshops in character-based improvisation (CBI).

== Filmography ==
- Fields of Fire for Zenith Productions Palm Beach Productions and Nine Network 1987–1989
- Come In Spinner for ABC 1990
- Sun on the Stubble (1996 miniseries)
- Kangaroo Palace (1997)
- All Saints (TV series) (1998)
- The Boys from the Bush (co-director with Shirley Barrett) for BBC 2001, 2002
- The Potato Factory (miniseries) for ABC 2000

He was also involved in production of Heartbreak High, Chandler & Co and Singapore Sling.

== Recognition ==
Marchand won the

- AACTA Award for Best short film in 1985
- AFI award for Best screenplay in a short film (1985)
- AFI award for best direction in a non-feature film (1985)
- AACTA Award for Best Direction in Television (1990) for Come In Spinner
