= A Sting in the Tale =

A Sting in the Tail
- Directed by: Eugene Schlusser
- Written by: Patrick Edgeworth
- Based on: story by Rosa Colosimo; Patrick Edgworth; Reg McLdean; Eugene Schlusser
- Produced by: Rosa Colosimo; Reg McLean
- Starring: Diane Craig; Gary Day
- Cinematography: Nicholas Sherman
- Edited by: Zbygniew Friedrich
- Music by: Alan Zavod
- Production company: Rosa Colosimo Films
- Release date: November 1989
- Running time: 92 minutes
- Country: Australia
- Language: English

A Sting in the Tale is a 1989 Australian political satire film directed by Eugene Schlusser and starring Diane Craig and Gary Day.

== Plot ==
Diane Lane (Diane Craig) is elected to Canberra as an MP. Her married lover, Barry Robbins (Gary Day), is Minister for Health and her best friend is journalist Louise Parker (Lynne Williams).

Barry wants to depose the current prime minister and tries to enlist the support of media baron Roger Monroe (Edwin Hodgeman). However, Diane is angry at Monroe for suppressing news of negligence in a mining disaster which killed her father and twenty others.

Diane leaks a document to embarrass the government about its plans for media ownership. The prime minister appoints her as minister to the arts in order to control her.

Diane then discovers Monroe has planted someone in her office to watch her. She tries to bring down Monroe and become Australia's first female prime minister.

== Cast ==
- Diane Craig as Diane Lane
- Gary Day as Barry Robbins
- Lynne Williams as Louise Parker
- Edwin Hodgeman as Roger Monroe
- Don Barker as Prime Minister
- John Noble as Prime Minister's Minder
- Tony Mack as Michael Meadows
- Bob Newman as Permanent Secretary
- Gordon Goulding as Wilson Sinclair
- Patrick Edgeworth as Editor
- Gary Bishop as Leader of the Opposition
- Robert Leach as Speaker of the House

== Production ==
The film was shot in Adelaide.
