= Hunt Angels =

- Directed by: Alec Morgan
- Written by: Alec Morgan
- Produced by: Daryl Dellora; Sue Maslin; Antonio Zeccola
- Starring: Victoria Hill; Ben Mendelsohn
- Cinematography: Jackie Farkas
- Edited by: Tony Stevens
- Music by: Jen Anderson
- Distributed by: Palace Films
- Release date: 6 October 2006
- Running time: 85 minutes
- Country: Australia
- Language: English

Hunt Angels is a 2006 Australian docudrama, directed by Alec Morgan, starring Victoria Hill and Ben Mendelsohn. Hunt Angels was filmed in Sydney, Australia and opened in Australia on 30 November 2006 after premiering at the Melbourne International Film Festival in August.

== Plot ==
The film is based on the true story of Rupert Kathner and his professional and personal partner Alma Brooks, two "not very successful but very passionate filmmakers," who struggled to make feature films and newsreels in Australia, between the mid 1930s and early 1950s. The film uses dramatisations featuring Ben Mendelsohn as Kathner and Victoria Hill as Brooks, with some dialogue taken from Kathner's own book. The film is also illustrated with clips from some of their films and creative visual effects based on contemporary photos. The film also includes real interviews with people who knew Kathner and Brooks, including Bud Tingwell and Paul F. Kathner.

== Cast ==
- Ben Mendelsohn as Rupert Kathner
- Victoria Hill as Alma Brooks
- Robert Bruning as Stanley Mount
- Peter Gwynne as Rodney Shaw
- Jonathan Hardy as Magistrate
- Bud Tingwell as Self

== Box office ==
Hunt Angels grossed $40,883 at the box office in Australia.

== Awards ==
| Year | Award | Category | Result | Ref. |
|---|---|---|---|---|
| 2006 | 2006 Australian Film Institute Awards | Best Documentary – Sue Maslin | Won | |
| 2006 | 2006 Australian Film Institute Awards | Best Cinematography in a Non-Feature Film – Jackie Fargas | Won | |
| 2006 | 2006 Australian Film Institute Awards | Visual Effects Award – Rose Draper & Mike Seymour | Won | |
| 2006 | 2006 Australian Film Institute Awards | Best Direction in a Documentary – Alec Morgan | Nominated | |

== See also ==
- Cinema of Australia
