= Run From the Morning =

- Starring: Michael Aitkens; Carol Burns; Margo Lee; Ray Barrett; Rod Mullinar; Charles 'Bud' Tingwell; Barbara Stephens; Bill Kerr; Ray Meagher
- Country of origin: Australia
- Original language: English
- No. of episodes: 6

Original release
- Network: ABC
- Release: September 1978 – October 1978

Run From the Morning is an Australian thriller television series. Its six episodes were first broadcast on the ABC during September–October 1978.

== Cast ==
- Michael Aitkens as Harry Blake
- Carol Burns as Sylvia Blake
- Margo Lee as Mrs Hennessy
- Ray Barrett as Detective Sergeant Grogon
- Rod Mullinar as Spencer
- Charles 'Bud' Tingwell as Vic Hennessy
- Barbara Stephens as Hilary Pilowski
- Bill Kerr as Morrie Nelson
- Rod Mullinar as Spencer
- Vincent Gil as Stackwell
- Ray Meagher as Constable 1
- Julieanne Newbould
