= Don Parties On =

- Original language: English
- Written by: David Williamson

Premiere
- Date: 13 January 2011
- Place: Arts Centre Playhouse

Don Parties On is a 2011 play written by David Williamson. It was a sequel to Don's Party and opened the 2011 season of the Melbourne Theatre Company. Directed by Robyn Nevin, this sequel premiered on 13 January 2011 at the Arts Centre Melbourne Playhouse.

The same characters 40 years on plus a few new arrivals. Don is now a retired school teacher.

== Plot ==
Old friends gather for a federal election night hosted by the protagonist, Don. This year's party includes returning guests and new arrivals, such as spouses and children, all of whom have followed previous election results, incoming results, and each other's lives.

== Background ==
Williamson said he wrote the play for two reasons:

One was, what had happened to Don and his friends? The 20-somethings of Don’s Party were starting to ask themselves how their lives were going to pan out. Would their hopes and dreams be realised? Forty years later they know exactly how things have panned out – who has succeeded and who has failed and what criteria do you use to evaluate such questions in any case? Secondly, what has happened to Australia politically and socially in the intervening years? How has the landscape changed?

== Cast of Original Production ==
- Diane Craig - Helen
- Georgia Flood - Belle
- Darren Gilshenan - Richard
- Robert Grubb - Mal
- Frankie J. Holden - Cooley
- Sue Jones - Jenny
- Garry McDonald - Don Henderson
- Tracy Mann - Kath Henderson
- Nikki Shiels - Roberta

== Reception ==
The play received mixed reviews but proved popular.
