= Double Deal (1983 film) =

- Directed by: Brian Kavanagh
- Written by: Brian Kavanagh
- Produced by: Brian Kavanagh; Lyn Barker
- Starring: Louis Jourdan; Angela Punch McGregor; Warwick Comber; Diane Craig; Bruce Spence; Kerry Walker
- Music by: Bruce Smeaton
- Distributed by: Filmco
- Release dates: June 1982 (Sydney Film Festival); September 1983
- Running time: 86 mins
- Country: Australia
- Language: English
- Budget: AU$1 million
- Box office: AU$3,731 (Australia)

Double Deal is a 1983 Australian film about a bored wife of a rich man who has an affair and becomes a thief.

== Plot ==
Peter and Christine Sterling have an uneventful marriage. When a stranger comes into their lives, Christine is intrigued, and the two begin an affair. Things escalate and the two philanderers soon plot to rob Peter of a precious gemstone.

== Cast ==
- Angela Punch McGregor as Christine Sterling
- Louis Jourdan as Peter Sterling
- Diane Craig as Miss Stevens
- Bruce Spence as Doug Mitchell
- Kerry Walker as Sibyl Anderson
- Peter Cummins as Detective Mills

== Production ==
Brian Kavanagh originally wrote the script shortly after he made the film A City's Child in 1971. Its original title was Shazam and Kavanagh says the script was "originally planned as a companion piece" for A City's Child which dealt "with the restrictions placed on women at that time" while Shazam would "show problems facing contemporary women and how confronting social demands affected them. Later that took a more commercial structure although the elements remained the same."

In 1980 Kanavagh and producer Lynn Barker were in Cannes with a film Kavanagh produced, Maybe This Time, and they pitched a package of three films to FilmCo: Double Deal, an adaptation of Mystery of a Hansom Cab and a third script. FilmCo did not respond to the three films but liked Double Deal and arranged to raise finance.

Kavanagh said they wanted a "suave, world weary, sophisticate" to play the male lead. He was offered William Shatner before Kavanagh agreed to cast Louis Jourdan who the director said "perfectly fitted my concept of the character, and proved to be so. A real professional and a charming man." The star's fee was $60,000.

Angela Punch McGregor later said she was "amazed" to be offered the role of a model but accepted the part because she had not worked for a while.

I feared that if I didn't do it I would go down the plug hole. The role was a mistake; the film was a mistake. But I didn't know that at the time. Brian Kavanagh turned out to be one of the most sensitive directors to actors that I have ever come across, but I don't think he should write his own scripts.

Filming began early January 1981 in Melbourne and took place over six weeks, with studio work in Port Melbourne. Country locations at Diggers Rest and Clarkefield, while the mansion was located in Toorak and belonged to Lindsay Fox.

The film was made without direct government investment and Kavanagh said the majority of the budget came from Pact Productions and for distribution via FilmCo but that there were some funds raised by 10BA tax concessions.

Kavanagh said that in November 1980, shortly before filming was to begin, Actors Equity started objecting to Jourdan's casting, and the situation was only resolved at Christmas Eve due to the intervention of Bobby Limb, Chair of Equity, who Kavanagh said "saved the day, by ordering they could not stop an actor of Louis' calibre performing, and so the heat was off, but just in time." Equity insisted that Angela Punch McGregor have top billing for the Australian cinema release.

Jourdan had visited Australia the year before filming to tour in a play.

== Reception ==
Kavanagh said "Roadshow were the distributors but were never really behind the film, and it got the obligatory two weeks at the then Bryson Cinema. I know it had screenings in Europe and elsewhere, presumably via Goldwyn, also VHS and DVD releases."

In a 1988 review of Final Cut, Jim Schembri of The Age called Double Deal the worst Australian film ever made.
