= Jugglers Three =

Play written by David Williamson

Juggler's Three
- Written by: David Williamson
- Original language: English
- Subject: Vietnam War

Premiere
- Date premiered: 17 July 1972
- Place premiered: Russell St Theatre, Melbourne

Juggler's Three is an Australian play by David Williamson. It was based on the breakup of his first marriage, when he left his pregnant wife for a woman who left her husband.

== Background ==
The play was commissioned by John Sumner of the Melbourne Theatre Company in mid 1971. Williamson submitted a storyline called Return from Vietname about a conscript, Graham, who discovers his wife, Karen, has left him for an economist, Neville. The play was originally titled Third World Blues but the MTC requested this be changed to Juggler's Three. The play underwent many revisions, and at one stage included sequences set in Vietnam.

The original production by the Melbourne Theatre Company at the Russell Street Theatre opened 17 July 1972, designed by Kim Carpenter and directed by Malcolm Robertson.

The first production was very well reviewed and later transferred from Russell Street to Harry M. Miller's Melbourne Playbox Theatre, which was rare for Australian plays at the time

Williamson later called the play "a hysterical and unresearched piece of melodramatical nonsense."

== Characters ==
On-stage:

Graham, mid 20s, a poet, writer, and Vietnam veteran, wrote a paper railing against T.S. Eliot, Joseph Conrad, and D.H. Lawrence and a 17-poem cycle on cannibalism ... Sean Scully
Neville Anderson, mid-30s, an economist ... Edwin Hodgeman
Elizabeth Anderson, late 20s, Neville's pregnant wife ... Sandy Gore
Dennis, early 20s, another Vietnam veteran, covered in boils, friend of Graham, robbed a gas xstation ... Gary Day
Jamie Robertson, 30, a doctor ... Peter Adams
Keren, mid-20s, Graham's wife and Neville's lover ... Kirsty Child
Policeman, 40s, likes to make a Civil Liberties sandwich,"plac[ing] young pricks between two mattresses mattreses and beat[ing] the Christ outa them," ... Lloyd Cunnington

Mentioned:

English professor, contemptuous of Graham
Tke Colonel, an American that Graham claims that he shot
Joe the Mechanic, Neville thinks he's scamming Elizabeth
Damien Andersin, the Andersons' son, in kindergartenn, has a stomach wog
Brendan and Lauris, friends of Elizabeth that Neville doesn't like, calls them a prick and a bitch
Maureen, friend of Elizabeth, thought Neville went from sensitive to egocentric
Dennis's wife
Cheryl, Dennis's infant daughter
Gas station attendant, assaulted by Dennis
Mel, friend of Elizabeth, having an affair
Anne, Mels's wife, unaware of the affair
Kovacs, friends of Graham and Karen; Graham was upset about not being invited to their wedding then got embarrasssed when he finally was.

== Third World Blues ==
Williamson later reworked the play again in 1996 as Third World Blues. This was done at the behest of Wayne Harrison, the director, who was an admirer of the original play. There had been a well publicised conflict between Harrison and Williamson over the staging of Heretic but they reunited for this play.

Williamson rewrote the play after researching by talking to Vietnam veterans and counsellors saying "I slowly started to realise just how traumatic war and combat is for most participants." He also made key structural changes saying "the original was virtually in farce form - there was something like 39 entrances and exits. It's down to 19 now, which structurally makes it half as farcical as before."

== Notes ==
- Brian Kiernan, David Williamson: A Writer's Career, Currency Press, 1996
