= Alex Frayne =

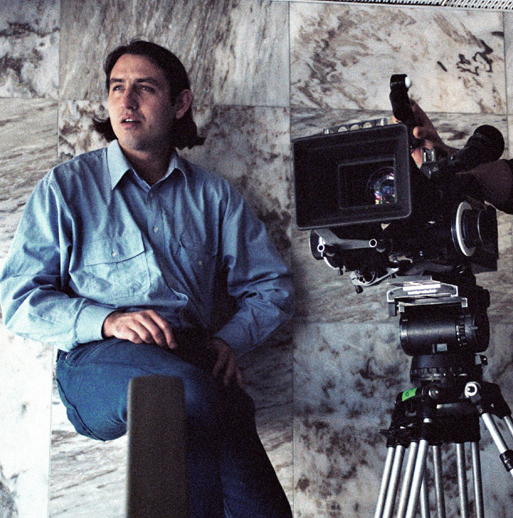
- Born: 3 August 1975 (age 51); London, England
- Occupation: Photographer
- Years active: 1993 – present

Alex Frayne is an Adelaide-based Australian photo artist whose images have received attention locally and abroad. He studied film at the Flinders University of South Australia, where he met long-time collaborator and cinematographer Nick Remy Matthews.

== Biography ==
Alex Frayne graduated from Flinders University with a Bachelor of Arts in 1996, moving straight into production with a series of short films from 1998 to 2004, before switching to photography as his primary artistic expression.

He directed, edited, and produced his debut feature film Modern Love in 2006.

Variety critic Richard Kuipers hailed the film:

"...unlike anything else in the Australian genre catalogue"

Between 2014 and 2020 he produced a series of photographic books for Wakefield Press (Australia).

Discussing the third of these books, (Landscapes of South Australia), Simon Caterson wrote in The Australian:

"...The book confirms that Frayne, who uses old cameras and expired film in his artistic practice, deserves to be thought of alongside Ansel Adams and the other great landscape photographers..."

== Books ==
- Adelaide Noir (2014)
- Theatre of Life(2017)
- Landscapes of South Australia (2020)
- Distance and Desire (2024)
