= After Marcuse =

1988 Australian television film

- Written by: Alma De Groen
- Directed by: Ted Robinson
- Starring: Diane Craig; Penne Hackforth-Jones; Grigor Taylor
- Country of origin: Australia
- Original language: English

Production
- Producer: Alan Burke
- Running time: 75 minutes

Original release
- Network: ABC
- Release: 1988

After Marcuse is an Australian television film. It stars Diane Craig, Penne Hackforth-Jones, and Grigor Taylor.

== Cast ==
- Diane Craig as Liz
- Penne Hackforth-Jones as Gillian
- Grigor Taylor as Warren
- David Whitney as Paul
- Paul Mason as Laurence
- Jim Kemp as Ron
- Muriel Hopkins as Helen
- Carmen Warrington as Kate
- Anna Phillips as Sally Tate
- Margaret Maddock as Elly
