= The Department (play) =

1974 Australian play by David Williamson

- Original language: English
- Written by: David Williamson
- Genre: Drama
- Setting: University

Premiere
- Date: 15 November 1974
- Place: The Playhouse, Adelaide, South Australia

The Department is a 1974 play by Australian playwright David Williamson. It was adapted for television in 1980.

== Synopsis ==
The plot revolves around political intrigue at a university department, which Williamson based on his experiences as a lecturer at Swinburne Tech.

== Background and production history ==
The Department was commissioned by the inaugural artistic director of the State Theatre Company of South Australia, George Ogilvie, and premiered in 1974 at the opening of The Playhouse at the newly-built Adelaide Festival Centre. It then transferred to Melbourne and Sydney, and enjoyed national success.

About the play, Williamson commented: "There are a lot of issues raised in the play but I offer no solution for them... I don't know what the solutions are".

== TV adaptation ==
"The Department (play)"
- Australian Theatre Festival episode
- Written by: David Williamson
- Based on: the play by David Williamson
- Original air date: 1980
- Running time: 65 minutes

The play was adapted into a television film in 1980 which was produced by Noel Ferrier as part of the Australian Theatre Festival, a series of adaptations of Australian plays filmed by ABC Television.

=== Cast ===
- Peter Sumner as Robby
- Richard Moir as Peter
- Grant Dodwell as John
- Barbara Stephens
- John Ewart
- Anne Tenney

=== Reception ===
The Canberra Times called it "a poorly constructed exercise".

One reviewer in The Age called it "a success... some remarkable goods". Another reviewer from that paper called it "an excellent production".

A critic from The Sydney Morning Herald wrote "it's a long time since I've seen a better sustained performance in a locally produced TV play".

Jack Hibberd, whose play A Toast to Melba was also filmed as part of the festival, called it "dreary, mundane. Awesomely so. I'm not impressed by that 'slice of life' realism style. It's just theatrical journalism".
