= Buckley's Chance =

2021 Australian film

- DVD cover
- Directed by: Tim Brown
- Written by: Tim Brown; Willem Wennekers
- Starring: Milan Burch; Bill Nighy; Victoria Hill; Martin Sacks
- Release date: 24 June 2021
- Running time: 95 minutes
- Countries: Australia; Canada
- Language: English

Buckley's Chance is a 2021 family adventure film directed by Tim Brown and starring Bill Nighy, Milan Burch and Victoria Hill. The plot concerns a 14-year-old boy relocating with his mother to his grandfather's farm in Western Australia following his father's death, and who goes missing as a result of foul play. It is an international co-production between Australia and Canada.

The film was released in 2021 to mixed reviews from the critics.

== Summary ==
Two New Yorkers, 14-year-old Ridley (Burch) and his mother Gloria (Hill) travel to Australia to spend time with Gloria's estranged father-in-law Spencer (Nighy) on his remote Western Australian cattle station "Buckley's Chance", following the death of Gloria's firefighter husband in the United States.

Conflict arises between Ridley and his grandfather during Spencer's attempts at connecting with his grandson who always carries a camcorder, a gift from his late father. During a camping trip, Ridley storms off and comes across a wild dingo trapped in barbed wire fencing which he rescues. Meanwhile, Spencer is being intimidated by three locals, Cooper, Mick and Oscar (Sacks, Wood and Gooley, respectively) in an attempt to get Spencer to sell the station. Ridley stumbles on Mick and Oscar attempting to set fire to Spencer's hay shed and attempts to document this with his camera. Desperate to hide, Ridley jumps under the cover at the back of their ute but can't escape in time and ends up being transported to a location unknown to him. While escaping from Mick and Oscar, Ridley gets lost but is reunited with the dingo he rescued, who he befriends as he attempts to find his way back to "Buckley's Chance" in the harsh conditions of the Australian outback.

Upon discovering Ridley missing, Spencer and his station manager Jules (Pell) coordinate a search with the local emergency services.

== Cast ==
- Milan Burch
- Bill Nighy
- Victoria Hill
- Ben Wood
- Kelton Pell
- Anthony Gooley
- Lillian Crombie as Aboriginal Wife

== Production ==
The film was directed by Tim Brown, who also co-wrote the script with Willem Wennekers.

Although the movie is set in Western Australia, it was actually filmed near Broken Hill, New South Wales in 2019.

Buckley's Chance was released to Australian cinemas on 24 June 2021, distributed by Transmission Films.

== Reception ==
Buckley's Chance received mixed reviews, as did Nighy's Australian accent, and the New York accents used by Hill and Burch.
