= Who Do You Think You Are? (1976 Australian TV series) =

- Genre: Comedy
- Created by: John O'Grady
- Written by: John O'Grady
- Starring: Barbara Stephens; Tony Llewellyn-Jones
- Country of origin: Australia
- No. of seasons: 1
- No. of episodes: 13

Production
- Producers: Bruce Best; Ted Robinson
- Running time: 30 minutes

Original release
- Network: ABC
- Release: 21 September – 14 December 1976

Who Do You Think You Are? is an Australian television sitcom which first screened on the ABC in 1976.

Who Do You Think You Are? follows the story of a young woman Kelly, who is recently separated from her husband Tony and is living with flatmate Tom.

== Cast ==
- Barbara Stephens as Kelly
- Tony Llewellyn-Jones as Tom
- Stephen O'Rourke as Tony
- John Ewart
- Susanne Haworth as Marcia
- Maggie Kirkpatrick

== See also ==
- List of Australian television series
