= Bonjour Balwyn =

- Directed by: Nigel Buesst
- Written by: Nigel Buesst; John Duigan; John Romeril
- Produced by: Nigel Buesst
- Starring: John Duigan; Peter Cummins; John Romeril
- Cinematography: Tom Cowan
- Edited by: Nigel Buesst; Peter Tammer
- Music by: Carrl Myriad; Janie Myriad
- Release date: October 1971
- Running time: 55 minutes
- Country: Australia
- Language: English

Bonjour Balwyn is a 1971 Australian independent film directed by Nigel Buesst and starring John Duigan, Peter Cummins, and John Romeril. It was one of the most notable films of the "Carlton Wave" of filmmaking.

== Premise ==
Kevin Agar is a Carlton-based owner of a fledgling magazine who struggles to make ends meet. As his financial situation turns desperate, he finds work assisting a television repair man with repossessions. Agar's parents live in the suburb of Balwyn.

== Cast ==
- John Duigan as Kevin Agar
- Peter Cummins as TV repairman
- John Romeril as Alan
- Patricia Condon as secretary
- Barbara Stephens as Christine
- Reg Newson as theatre producer
- Camilla Rountree as Rhonda
- Marcel Cugola
- Jim Nicholas
- Alan Finney
- Peter Carmody
- Geoff Gardener

== Production ==
Bonjour Balwyn was shot on 16mm with funds from the Experimental Film and Television Fund. The original running time was 70 minutes but it was cut down to under an hour to qualify for the short fiction competition at the Sydney Film Festival.

The film was not seen widely outside Melbourne.

== See also ==
- Cinema of Australia
- Australian films of 1971
