= Victoria Hill =

Australian actress, writer and producer (born 1971)

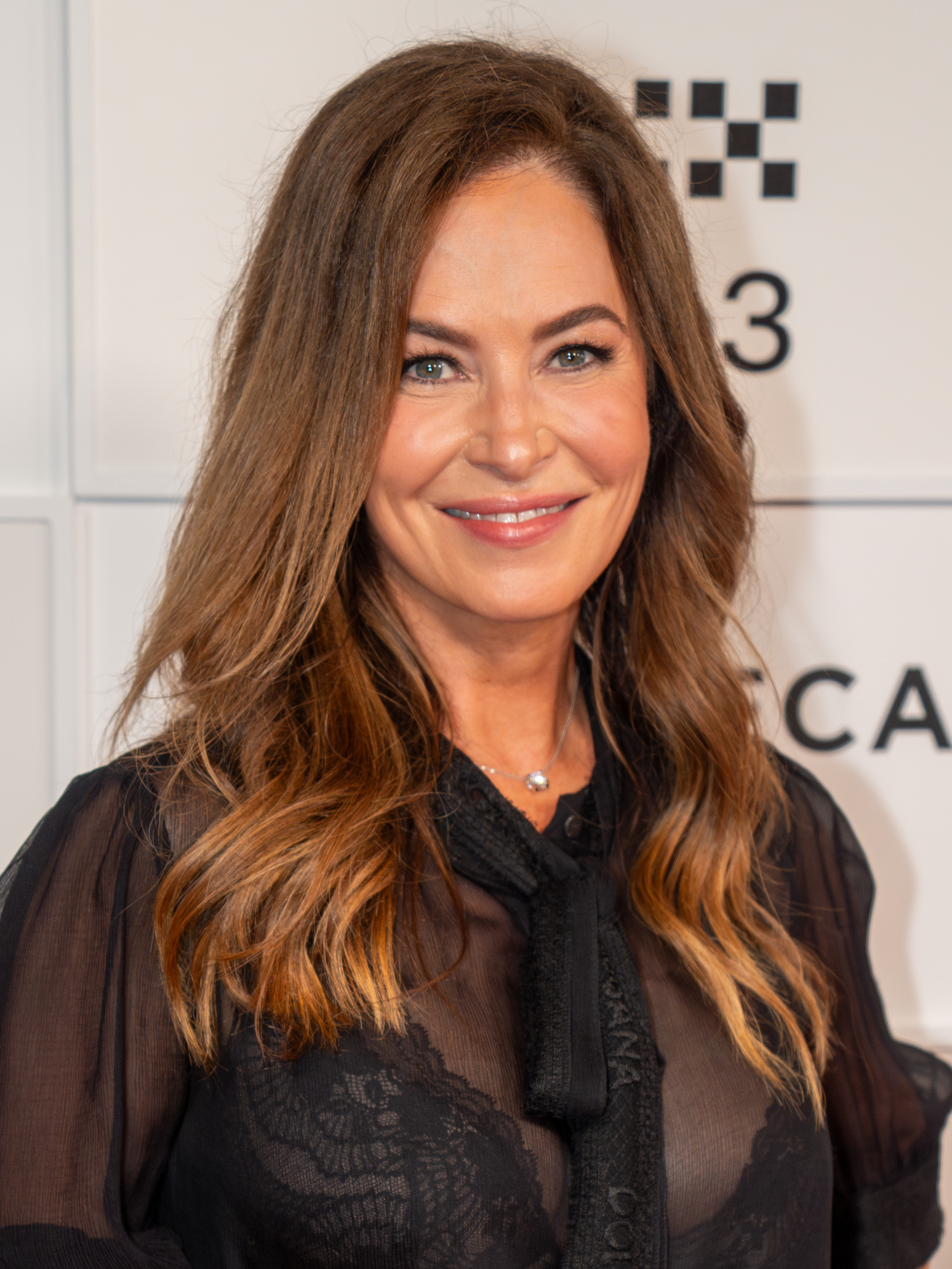
- Hill at the 2025 Tribeca Festival
- Born: 18 February 1971 (age 55); Adelaide, South Australia
- Occupations: Actress; writer; producer
- Years active: 1988-present
- Parent(s): Robert Hill, Diana Hill

Victoria Hill (born 18 February 1971) is an Australian actress, writer and producer.

== Early life and career ==
Victoria Hill is the daughter of Robert Hill, a former politician, diplomat and Chancellor of the University of Adelaide; and Diana Hill, the Australian president of UNICEF.

A graduate of Flinders University Drama Centre, she spent many years performing in theatre productions in Adelaide and interstate before winning her first part in a feature film, 1999's Dead End, soon followed by a role in Siam Sunset. Hill spent subsequent years performing on stage and in occasional television roles until her film career took off in 2006, with roles in Modern Love, Hunt Angels, BoyTown, December Boys and Macbeth, the Shakespeare adaptation which she also co-wrote and produced.

In 2018, she appeared in the Paul Schrader-directed film First Reformed, which she also co-produced.

== Selected filmography ==
=== Film ===
Year	Title	Role	Notes
1999	Siam Sunset	Maree	Feature film
1999	Dead End	Lori Peterson	
2006	December Boys	Teresa	Feature film
2006	BoyTown	Rosalita	Feature film
2006	Hunt Angels	Alma Brooks	Feature film
2006	Macbeth	Lady Macbeth	Feature film
2006	Modern Love	Emily	Feature film
2017	First Reformed	Esther	Feature film Also producer Nominated – Independent Spirit Award for Best Film
2018	The Chaperone	Myra Brooks	Feature film Also producer
2020	The Secrets We Keep	Claire	Feature film
2021	Buckley's Chance	Gloria	Feature film
2022	Master Gardener	Isobel Phelps	Feature film
2024	Oh, Canada	Diana	Feature film
2025	The Best You Can	TBA	Feature film Also producer
TBA	Geechee	TBA	Film (suspended)

=== Television ===
Year	Title	Role	Notes
2010	Dance Academy	Natasha	TV series, 4 episodes
