= Traveling Man (film) =

- Written by: David Taylor
- Directed by: Irvin Kershner
- Starring: John Lithgow; Jonathan Silverman; Margaret Colin; John Glover; John M. Jackson; Chynna Phillips
- Composer: Miles Goodman
- Country of origin: United States
- Original language: English

Production
- Producer: Thomas M. Hammel
- Cinematography: William Wages
- Editors: Sidney Katz; Virginia Katz
- Running time: 105 minutes
- Production company: HBO Pictures

Original release
- Network: HBO
- Release: June 25, 1989

Traveling Man is a 1989 American comedy film directed by Irvin Kershner and written by David Taylor. The film stars John Lithgow, Jonathan Silverman, Margaret Colin, John Glover, John M. Jackson and Chynna Phillips. The film premiered on HBO on June 25, 1989.

== Plot ==
A comedy about a middle-aged salesman trying to get his life and career back on track while being pushed and antagonized by an aggressive rookie he has been teamed up with.

Beset by business and marital problems, salesman Lithgow feels he's at the end of his rope. But it's at this point that he avoids the Willy Loman syndrome by realizing that there's more to life than a smile and a shoeshine.

== Cast ==
- John Lithgow as Ben Cluett
- Jonathan Silverman as Billy Fox
- Margaret Colin as Joanna Reath
- John Glover as Chick Beeler
- John M. Jackson as Joe Blagdon
- Chynna Phillips as Mona Voight
- Paul Armbruster as LeBeau
- Dawn Arnemann as Cora
- Jerry Campbell as Lydell
- Marc Clement as Harry Palatka
- Saundra Dunson-Franks as Molly
- David Dwyer as Hunt
- J. Don Ferguson as Riker
- Jennifer Hale as Joey
- Danny Nelson as Ackerman
- Bob Penny as John Parsons
- Johnny Popwell as Dick Duffy
- Alex Van as Buddy
- Tim Ware as Harve Stratton
- Diane Craig
