= Crunch Time (play) =

Australian play by David Williamson

- Written by: David Williamson
- Original language: English
- Genre: social comedy

Premiere
- Date premiered: February 2020
- Place premiered: Ensemble Theatre, Sydney

Crunch Time is an Australian play by David Williamson. It had its world premiere in 2020. Williamson says it is about a family at crisis point, "a story of sibling rivalry and a story about dying."

It will be Williamson's final play before he retires. "The 50 years really has marked the milestone for me," he said in 2020. "Audiences are still coming as strongly as ever. I want to get out. I don’t want to be wandering around at 98 wondering why the theatre’s only a third full.”

== Background ==
He says he was motivated to write it because of the failure of most Australian states to support voluntary euthanasia laws, saying "The NSW Liberal party seems to be still in thrall of the religious right, and it’s the lizard brain dictating the rational capacity of human beings; it’s some emotional fear that someone is going to turn the switch off on them, or God wants to prolong our pain as long as possible before we have a decent death.”.

Williamson added, “A friend of mine was generous enough to let me use his experience as the basis of the story: estranged from one of his sons and unable to see his grandchildren. I then invented him being given six months to live and his attempts to reconcile and bring the family together to help him die."

== Plot ==
Steve has recently retired and passed the family business over to his son Jimmy. Steve hasn't seen his eldest son Jimmy in eight years. When Steve suddenly falls ill, time is running out to repair their broken relationship.
