= And the Word Was Made Flesh =

- Directed by: Dusan Marek
- Written by: Dusan Marek
- Starring: Jan Cernohous; Jo Van Dalen
- Cinematography: Dusan Marek
- Music by: Robert Pendlebury
- Release date: 1971
- Running time: 65 minutes
- Country: Australia
- Language: English

And the Word Was Made Flesh is a 1971 Australian film directed and written by Dusan Marek and starring Jan Cernohous and Jo Van Dalen. The title of the film is a religious quote from John 1:14.

== Plot ==
A wandering scientist out collecting samples comes across a half naked woman being held captive. He rescues the woman but they are pursued by the captor and two strange alien creatures.

== Cast ==
- Jan Cernohous
- Jo Van Dalen
- John Kirk
- Christine Pearce
- David Stocker
