= A Toast to Melba =

Stage play and episode of Australian Theatre Festival

- Original language: English
- Written by: Jack Hibberd
- Characters: Dame Nellie Melba; Caruso; Treacle O'Kane; Madame Marchesi; Buffalo Bill; Lady de Grey; George Bernard Shaw; The Duke of Orleans; Sir Thomas Beecham; Neville Cardus; Oscar Wilde; Frank Wedekind; Mayor of Brisbane
- Genre: Drama

Premiere
- Date: 1976
- Place: Adelaide Festival

A Toast to Melba is a 1976 Australian play by Jack Hibberd.

A biography of Dame Nellie Melba, Hibberd described A Toast to Melba as:

Another 'Popular Play' like The Les Darcy Show. Using the Epic Theatre techniques of Bertolt Brecht (without politics), the play encompasses the life of diva Nellie Melba from childhood in Melbourne to her death in Egypt (alleged dying words: "I never did like Aida.")... The actress who plays Melba must be able to sing a few arias and parlour songs. There is a selection of recorded music that is essential to the work.

The play is one of Hibberd's personal favourites.

== 1980 TV adaptation ==
"A Toast to Melba"
- Australian Theatre Festival episode
- Written by: Jack Hibberd
- Based on: play by Jack Hibberd
- Original air date: 1980
- Running time: 85 mins

The play was adapted with Robyn Nevin in the title role by the ABC in 1980 as part of the Australian Theatre Festival.

Alan Burke's direction won him a Sammy Award. The production was much praised and was sold abroad.

=== Cast ===
- Robyn Nevin as Nellie Melba
- Michael Aitkens as Charles Armstrong
- Henri Szeps as Thomas Beecham / Buffalo Bill / Mayor of Brisbane
- Anna Volska
- Mervyn Drake
- Tim Elliott
- Jane Harders
- Donald MacDonald
