= A Hard God =

- Original language: English
- Written by: Peter Kenna
- Characters: Dan; Aggie; Joe; Jack; Monica
- Setting: Sydney 1946

Premiere
- Date: 17 August 1973
- Place: Nimrod Theatre, Sydney

A Hard God is a semi-autobiographical play by Peter Kenna.

The initial production starred Gloria Dawn, a vaudeville star who had been persuaded to appear in a "straight" role in Kenna's The Slaughter of St Teresa's Day.

The play was very popular and has come to be regarded as an Australian classic.

It was published by Currency Press in 1974.

== Select Key Productions ==
- May–June 1974 - Melbourne Theatre Company in association with Elizabethan Theatre Trust

== 1974 Film ==
A Hard God
- Written by: Peter Kenna
- Production company: Nimrod Theatre
- Distributed by: ABC
- Release dates: 26 October 1974 (Sydney); 2 November 1974
- Running time: 120 minutes
- Country: Australia
- Language: English

The Nimrod Theatre version of the play was directed by John Bell. This was filmed by the ABC in 1974. Carl Shutlz directed the production, which had been done on stage under the direction of John Bell.

It was one of a number of stage productions the ABC presented in the early 1970s along with Hamlet, The Misanthrope, and Spoiled.

=== Cast ===
- James Bowles as Paddy
- Gloria Dawn as Aggee
- Gerry Duggan as Martin
- Graham Rouse as Dan
- Kay Elkund
- Tony Sheldon as Joe
- Andrew Sharp

== 1981 TV adaptation ==
"A Hard God"
- Australian Theatre Festival episode
- Written by: Peter Kenna
- Original air date: 1981
- Running time: 80 minutes

The play was adapted for TV again by the ABC in 1981 for the Australian Theatre Festival.

=== Cast ===
- Patrick Phillips
- Betty Lucas
- Simon Burke
- Dawn Lake
- Martin Vaughan
- Graham Rouse
- Philippa Baker

== See also ==
- 1973 in Australian literature
