= Alma De Groen =

Australian feminist playwright

- Born: Alma Margaret Mathers; 5 September 1941 (age 84); Manawatū, New Zealand
- Occupation: Playwright
- Spouses: Geoffrey de Groen (m. 1965; div. 1976) Ian Mackenzie (m. 2021)
- Writing career
- Language: English
- Period: Contemporary
- Genres: Drama, historical drama, philosophical science-fiction
- Literary movement: Australian Second-wave feminism in drama (pioneer)

Alma De Groen is an Australian feminist playwright, born in New Zealand on 5 September 1941.

== Biography ==
Alma Margaret Mathers, born in Manawatū, grew up in Mangakino, a small township founded to serve a hydro-electric power station in the North Island of New Zealand. Her earliest experience of theatre was being taken, as a high school student, to a New Zealand Players production of Saint Joan, which starred Edith Campion, the mother of Jane Campion, as Saint Joan. This, along with a tiny local library which contained works by Shaw and Wilde, began her interest in theatre.

In 1964 she moved to Australia and through the artist Geoffrey De Groen, whom she married in 1965, Alma De Groen was introduced to the film maker Sandy Harbutt, who read her first play, The Sweatproof Boy. Harbutt persuaded theatre director Brian Syron to read it and a mentorship lasting many years began. Syron was the first Aboriginal Australian to study at RADA and at the legendary Stella Adler Studio in New York. His letters of advice and encouragement, and the opportunity to stay with him in New York, where he took her to see Off-Broadway theatre, were critical to her development as a playwright. (Elizabeth Perkins pg 5)

== Career ==
Her career began in earnest when she was living in Canada with husband Geoffrey, and daughter, Nadine. The Nimrod Theatre in Sydney performed The Sweatproof Boy in 1972, directed by Richard Wherrett, who directed most of her early work. The APG (Australian Performing Group) produced her second play, The Joss Adams Show at The Pram Factory in Melbourne, also in 1972. This play, along with the group-devised Women's Theatre Group's Betty Can Jump, was the first expression of Second Wave feminism in Melbourne theatre. (Denise Varney pg 25)

When she returned to Australia in 1973 she became involved with the Australian National Playwrights' Conference, first as a playwright, and later for many years serving as a dramaturg.

Her best-known work is The Rivers of China, featuring the short story writer Katherine Mansfield, which premiered at the Sydney Theatre Company in 1987. It won the Premier's Award in both NSW and Victoria, and is included by the Australian Society of Authors in its list of Australia's 200 best literary works.

In Belonging: Australian Playwrighting in the 20th Century, critic John McCallum describes The Woman in the Window, featuring the poet Anna Akhmatova, as her masterpiece. He calls it and The Rivers of China "the first great works of serious philosophical science fiction written for the theatre in Australia". The Woman in the Window is included, along with Summer of the Seventeenth Doll from Australia, in Lucy Kerbel's 100 Great Plays for Women.

She was the first playwright to receive the Patrick White Award in 1998.

Her papers are archived at The Australian Defence Force Academy.

== Works ==
=== Theatre ===
- The Sweatproof Boy
- The Joss Adams Show
- Perfectly All Right
- The After-Life of Arthur Cravan
- Chidley
- Going Home
- Vocations
- The Rivers of China
- The Girl Who Saw Everything
- Wildheart (co-writer and dramaturge with Legs on the Wall)
- The Woman in the Window
- Wicked Sisters

=== Television ===
- Going Home. Adaptation of stage play, 1980
- Rafferty's Rules. Series episode, "The Women", 1984
- Man of Letters. Adaptation of the novel by Glen Tomasetti, 1984
- Singles. Series episode, "Chris", 1988
- After Marcuse. Original teleplay, 1989

=== Radio ===
- Available Light, 1993
- Invisible Sun, 1994
- The Rivers of China (radio adaptation) 1989
- Stories in the Dark (with Ian Mackenzie) Australian Prix Italia entry, 1996

== Awards ==
- 1985 Television Adaptation AWGIE Award for Man of Letters
- 1988 NSW Premier's Literary Award for The Rivers of China
- 1988 Victorian Premier's Literary Award Louis Esson Prize for Drama for The Rivers of China
- 1993 Stage AWGIE Award for The Girl Who Saw Everything
- 1998 Patrick White Award
