= List of Homicide episodes =

Homicide is an Australian police procedural television series which aired from 1964 to 1977 on Seven Network.

== Series overview ==
Series	Episodes	Originally released	
Series	Episodes	First released	Last released
1	9	20 October 1964	15 December 1964
2	37	21 January 1965	3 December 1965
3	47	10 December 1965	20 December 1966
4	48	24 January 1967	19 December 1967
5	47	30 January 1968	17 December 1968
6	46	28 January 1969	2 December 1969
7	46	27 January 1970	1 December 1970
8	40	19 January 1971	16 November 1971
9	43	1 February 1972	7 November 1972
10	38	6 February 1973	6 November 1973
11	39	22 January 1974	29 October 1974
12	48	4 February 1975	30 December 1975
13	23	6 January 1976	31 May 1976

== Episodes ==
=== Season 1 (1964) ===
No. overall	Title	Directed by	Written by	Original release date
1	"The Stunt"	Bruce Ross-Smith & Ian Jones	Phil Freedman & Ian Jones	20 October 1964
2	"A Handful of Money"	Bruce Ross-Smith & Ian Jones	Sonia Borg	27 October 1964
3	"The Rosary"	Bruce Ross-Smith & Ian Jones	Sonia Borg	3 November 1964
4	"The Knot"	Bruce Ross-Smith & Ian Jones	Phil Freedman	10 November 1964
5	"The Man in the Suede Suit"	Bruce Ross-Smith & Ian Jones	Phil Freedman	17 November 1964
6	"Aunt Sally"	Alf Potter & Ian Jones	Enid Johns	24 November 1964
7	"Scent of Death"	Bruce Ross-Smith & Ian Jones	Della Foss-Paine	1 December 1964
8	"The Missing Letter"	Bruce Ross-Smith & Ian Jones	Sonia Borg	8 December 1964
9	"The Silent Witness"	Bruce Ross-Smith & Ian Jones	Enid Johns	15 December 1964

=== Season 2 (1965) ===
No. overall	No. in season	Title	Directed by	Written by	Original release date
10	1	"The Hook"	Bruce Ross-Smith & Ian Jones	Douglas Tainsh & Phil Freedman	21 January 1965
11	2	"Manhunt"	Bruce Ross-Smith & Ian Jones	Della Foss-Paine	2 February 1965
12	3	"The Decimal Point"	Bruce Ross-Smith & Ian Jones	David Baker & Sonia Borg	9 February 1965
13	4	"Aftermath"	Bruce Ross-Smith & Ian Jones	Phil Freedman	16 February 1965
14	5	"Business is Business"	Bruce Ross-Smith & Ian Jones	Christine Nicholson	23 February 1965
15	6	"The Skeleton"	Bruce Ross-Smith & Ian Jones	Della Foss-Paine	2 March 1965
16	7	"The Juveniles"	Bruce Ross-Smith & Ian Jones	Della Foss-Paine	27 April 1965
17	8	"Motive for Two"	Bruce Ross-Smith & Ian Jones	Christine Nicholson	11 May 1965
18	9	"Strange Cargo"	Bruce Ross-Smith & Ian Jones	Enid Johns	18 May 1965
19	10	"Dead on Two"	Bruce Ross-Smith & Ian Jones	Sonia Borg	25 May 1965
20	11	"The White Mistress"	Bruce Ross-Smith & Ian Jones	Della Foss-Paine	4 June 1965
21	12	"The Violators"	Bruce Ross-Smith & Ian Jones	Phil Freedman	15 June 1965
22	13	"The Partners"	Bruce Ross-Smith & Ian Jones	Christine Nicholson & Phil Freedman	18 June 1965
23	14	"The Brand"	Bruce Ross-Smith & Ian Jones	Enid Johns	25 June 1965
24	15	"Ladies' Man"	Bruce Ross-Smith & Ian Jones	Della Foss-Paine	13 July 1965
24A	16	"One Man Crime Wave"	Bruce Ross-Smith & Ian Jones	Enid Johns & Phil Freedman	20 July 1965
25	17	"Forgotten Murder"	Bruce Ross-Smith & Ian Jones	Sonia Borg	27 July 1965
26	18	"Second Time Around"	Bruce Ross-Smith & Ian Jones	Phil Freedman	3 August 1965
27	19	"Fifth Column"	Bruce Ross-Smith & Ian Jones	Enid Johns & Phil Freedman	30 July 1965
28	20	"Eye-Witness"	Bruce Ross-Smith & Ian Jones	???	17 August 1965
29	21	"Inside the City"	Bruce Ross-Smith & Ian Jones	Della Foss-Paine	13 August 1965
30	22	"Catapult"	Bruce Ross-Smith & Ian Jones	Richard Lane	31 August 1965
31	23	"An Act of Love"	Bruce Ross-Smith & Ian Jones	Jeff Underhill	7 September 1965
32	24	"Double Cross"	Bruce Ross-Smith & Ian Jones	Enid Johns	14 September 1965
33	25	"Sentence of Death"	Bruce Ross-Smith & Ian Jones	Sonia Borg	12 October 1965
34	26	"Witch Hunt"	Bruce Ross-Smith & Ian Jones	Sonia Borg	5 October 1965
35	27	"For Pity's Sake"	Bruce Ross-Smith & Ian Jones	Mary Underhill	21 September 1965
36	28	"Birds of a Feather"	Bruce Ross-Smith & Ian Jones	Enid Johns	28 September 1965
37	29	"Colour of Hate"	Bruce Ross-Smith & Ian Jones	Della Foss-Paine	26 October 1965
38	30	"Let's Have a Funeral"	Bruce Ross-Smith & Ian Jones	Phil Freedman	19 October 1965
39	31	"A Lonely Place"	Bruce Ross-Smith & Ian Jones	Richard Lane	2 November 1965
40	32	"The Outcast"	Bruce Ross-Smith & David Lee	Della Foss-Paine	9 November 1965
41	33	"Good and Sufficient Reason"	Bruce Ross-Smith & David Lee	Enid Johns	16 November 1965
42	34	"Speed the Dying"	Bruce Ross-Smith & David Lee	Della Foss-Paine	12 November 1965
43	35	"The Novice"	Bruce Ross-Smith & Ian Jones	Phil Freedman	30 November 1965
44	36	"Coincidence"	Bruce Ross-Smith & David Lee	Sonia Borg	7 December 1965
45	37	"Sunday Frolic"	Alf Potter & David Lee	Enid Johns	3 December 1965

=== Season 3 (1965–66) ===
No. overall	No. in season	Title	Directed by	Written by	Original release date
46	1	"The Gamblers"	Bruce Ross-Smith & David Lee	Della Foss-Paine	10 December 1965
47	2	"A Question Of Honour"	Bruce Ross-Smith & David Lee	Sonia Borg	1 February 1966
48	3	"Vicious Circle"	Bruce Ross-Smith & David Lee	Phil Freedman	8 February 1966
49	4	"Three-Headed Dog"	Bruce Ross-Smith & Ian Jones	Ian Jones	15 February 1966
50	5	"No Honour Among Thieves"	Bruce Ross-Smith & Ian Jones	Enid Johns	1 March 1966
51	6	"Detour"	Bruce Ross-Smith & David Lee	Phil Freedman	8 March 1966
52	7	"Chain Reaction"	Bruce Ross-Smith & Ian Jones	Mary Wilton	15 March 1966
53	8	"Holiday Affair"	Bruce Ross-Smith & Ian Jones	Louis Ben-Dixon & Phil Freedman	22 March 1966
54	9	"Wolf Pack"	Bruce Ross-Smith & Ian Jones	Della Foss-Paine	29 March 1966
55	10	"Country Boy"	Bruce Ross-Smith & David Lee	Della Foss-Paine	5 April 1966
56	11	"Flashpoint"	Ian Jones & David Lee	Ian Jones	19 April 1966
57	12	"The Old Game"	Bruce Ross-Smith & David Lee	Enid Johns	12 April 1966
58	13	"Vendetta"	Bruce Ross-Smith & Ian Jones	Ian Jones	26 April 1966
59	14	"The Last Enemy"	Bruce Ross-Smith & David Lee	Phil Freedman	3 May 1966
60	15	"Terror That Strikes"	Bruce Ross-Smith & David Lee	Della Foss-Paine	10 May 1966
62	16	"Let's Get Together"	Bruce Ross-Smith & David Lee	Della Foss-Paine	24 May 1966
63	17	"Wasp Nest"	Bruce Ross-Smith & David Lee	Sonia Borg	31 May 1966
64	18	"Knife & Beads"	Bruce Ross-Smith & David Lee	Ru Pullan	21 June 1966
65	19	"The Witness"	Bruce Ross-Smith & David Lee	Enid Johns	7 June 1966
66	20	"Flashback"	Bruce Ross-Smith & Ian Jones	Ian Jones	28 June 1966
67	21	"The Boy From Anywhere"	Bruce Ross-Smith & David Lee	Pat Kingsley	5 July 1966
68	22	"Nor All Thy Tears"	Bruce Ross-Smith & David Lee	Della Foss-Paine	14 June 1966
69	23	"Circumstantial Evidence"	Bruce Ross-Smith & David Lee	Enid Johns	12 July 1966
70	24	"Deadly Flagfall"	Bruce Ross-Smith & David Lee	Anthony Evans	19 July 1966
71	25	"Death Us Do Part"	Bruce Ross-Smith & David Lee	Phil Freedman	26 July 1966
72	26	"Tiger Hunt"	Bruce Ross-Smith & David Lee	Ian Jones	2 August 1966
73	27	"Where There's A Will"	Bruce Ross-Smith & David Lee	Terry Stapleton	9 August 1966
74	28	"End Of Class"	Bruce Ross-Smith & David Lee	Della Foss-Paine	16 August 1966
75	29	"The Black Book"	Bruce Ross-Smith & David Lee	Phil Freedman	23 August 1966
76	30	"The Snipers"	Bruce Ross-Smith & Ian Jones	Ian Jones	30 August 1966
77	31	"Merry Go Round"	Bruce Ross-Smith & David Lee	Brett Marshall	6 September 1966
78	32	"A One-Man Show"	Bruce Ross-Smith & David Lee	Terry Stapleton	13 September 1966
79	33	"Man At Bay"	Bruce Ross-Smith & David Lee	Della Foss-Paine	20 September 1966
80	34	"Pattern Of Guilt"	Bruce Ross-Smith & David Lee	Mary Wilton	27 September 1966
81	35	"Seven Winds"	Bruce Ross-Smith & David Lee	Sonia Borg	4 October 1966
82	36	"My Brother Must Rest"	Bruce Ross-Smith & David Lee	Brett Marshall	11 October 1966
83	37	"What Milk Train?"	Bruce Ross-Smith & Ian Jones	Terry Stapleton	18 October 1966
84	38	"A Girl Who Liked Beads"	Bruce Ross-Smith & David Lee	Della Foss-Paine	25 October 1966
85	39	"The Ex"	Bruce Ross-Smith & David Lee	Terry Stapleton	1 November 1966
86	40	"The Hostage"	Bruce Ross-Smith & Ian Jones	Ian Jones	1 November 1966
87	41	"Time To Pay"	Bruce Ross-Smith & David Lee	Terry Stapleton	15 November 1966
88	42	"No Room For The Innocent"	Bruce Ross-Smith & David Lee	Sonia Borg	22 November 1966
89	43	"Moment Of Truth"	Bruce Ross-Smith & David Lee	Brett Marshall	29 November 1966
90	44	"Man In The Park"	Bruce Ross-Smith & David Lee	Phil Freedman	6 December 1966
91	45	"Don't Sing To Uniforms"	Bruce Ross-Smith & David Lee	Terry Stapleton	6 December 1966
92	46	"Roughshod"	Bruce Ross-Smith & David Lee	Della Foss-Paine	20 December 1966

=== Season 4 (1967) ===
No. overall	No. in season	Title	Directed by	Written by	Original release date
93	1	"A Long Shadow"	Bruce Ross-Smith & David Lee	Terry Stapleton	24 January 1967
94	2	"Final Payment"	Bruce Ross-Smith & David Lee	Phil Freedman & Harold Lander	31 January 1967
95	3	"Keeper Of Lions"	Bruce Ross-Smith & David Lee	Della Foss-Paine	7 February 1967
