= Malcolm Robertson =

Malcolm Robertson may refer to

- Malcolm Robertson (diplomat) (1877–1951), British diplomat and politician
- Malcolm Robertson (footballer) (1951–2010), Scottish footballer
- Malcolm Robertson (rower), Australian rower
- Malcolm Robertson, Australian actor and theatre director, winner of the Kenneth Myer Medallion for the Performing Arts in 2000

== See also ==
- Robertson (surname)
