= Modern Love (2006 film) =

- Directed by: Alex Frayne
- Written by: Nick Remy Matthews (screenplay)
- Produced by: Alex Frayne, Maureen Ritchie, Catherine Powell
- Starring: Mark Constable; Victoria Hill
- Cinematography: Nick Remy Matthews
- Edited by: Alex Frayne
- Music by: Tom Heuzenroeder (original music)
- Distributed by: Accent Film [au], B-Rudfunk, Germany
- Release dates: 30 July 2006 (Moscow International Film Festival); 23 November 2007 (Australia)
- Running time: 95 minutes
- Country: Australia
- Language: English
- Budget: $150,000 (estimated)
- Box office: $549

Modern Love is the debut feature film of award-winning Australian director Alex Frayne. It was independently financed and filmed in South Australia, where the director lives and works. The team behind the film (Sputnik Films) includes award-winning cinematographer Nick Remy Matthews and Australian Film Institute winning sound designer Tom Heuzenroeder.

Modern Love premiered at the 28th Moscow International Film Festival and progressed to dozens of other film festivals, including the Locarno Film Festival, São Paulo International Film Festival, and the Fajr Film Festival in Iran. It made its Australian screen debut at the 2007 Adelaide Film Festival, where the film was reviewed by Variety's critic Richard Kuipers who called it:

"unlike anything else in the entire Australian genre catalogue."

The film earned theatrical runs in Australia (Nova Cinemas), and in New Zealand at the Paramount Cinema in Wellington. Dominion Post film reviewer Graeme Tuckett wrote that it was:

"the best thing playing in town. No contest."

== Synopsis ==
John, his wife Emily, and their small son Edward leave the city for what they believe will be a brief foray to the countryside to claim John's inheritance – a small shack. They find themselves in a strange back-woods rural setting...nothing is what it seems, and John's behaviour becomes increasingly bizarre as he crosses paths with the unusual inhabitants of the area, some of whom he knows from a distant past.

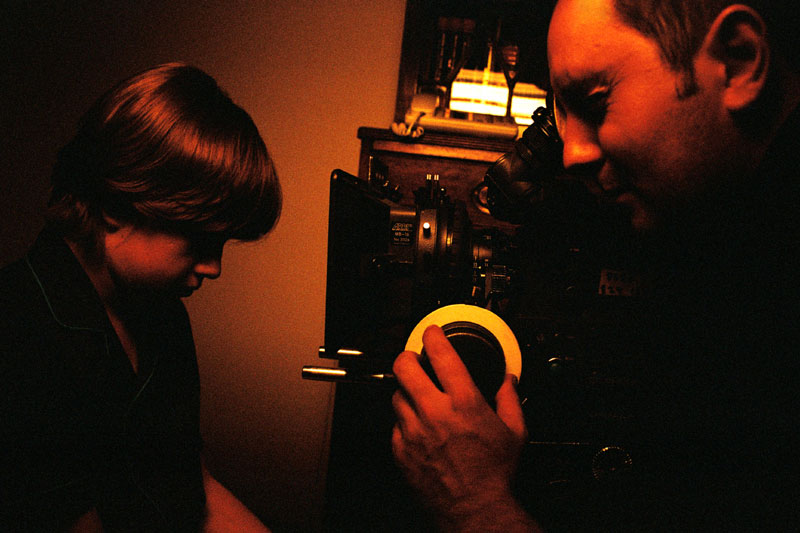
(Nick Remy Matthews ACS) and Ed (William Traeger)

As his connections to the area are gradually revealed, we are shown a puzzle and a tapestry of our hero and his life before he moved away. To his wife's horror we witness a man who belongs to a long lineage of disaster and mishap and rural weirdness. As the realisation sets in of what has happened, the spectre of the next-in-line, his son Edward, becomes spookily evident.

== Cast ==
- Mark Constable as John
- Victoria Hill as Emily
- William Traeger as Ed
- Craig Behenna as Daniel
- Don Barker as Old Tom
- Barbara West as Motel Lady
- Chrissie Page as Mother
- Michael Baldwin as Father
- Irene Tunis as Rosa
- Edwin Hodgeman as Old Man in Motel

== Criticisms ==
Modern Love received harsh reviews in Australia with some critics focusing on the ambiguity of the title as well as the disorientating plot structure the film offers. Both Alex Frayne and Nick Matthews maintain the title to be valid yet neither has fully explained its origins at any time throughout the film's exposure to audiences. Jake Wilson of The Age derided the film as being akin to an Australian "Tarkovsky" work, while dramaturg Phyllis-Jane Rose branded it the "darkest" film ever made. Frayne himself calls the film "Australian Gothic," and "like walking into a nightmare which you wish would last longer." These inclinations explain both the film's art-house success in Europe as well as its muted response in Australia. In France the film picked up the Best Foreign Film award at the ECU Festival in March 2007.

== DVD releases ==
In Australia the film was released by Accent Underground. In the United States the film was released by Seminal Films.

== Film Festivals ==
- 2006 Moscow International Film Festival
- 2006 Locarno Film Festival
- 2006 São Paulo International Film Festival
- 2006 Hof International Film Festival, Germany
- 2006 Split New Films, Croatia
- 2007 Fajr Film Festival, Iran
- 2007 Adelaide Film Festival
- 2007 Kuala Lumpur International Film Festival
- 2007 Bradford Fantasy Film Festival
- 2007 ECU Film Festival, France
- 2007 Salento International Film Festival, Italy

== Box office ==
Modern Love grossed $549.00 at the box office in Australia.

== See also ==
- Cinema of Australia
