= The Sun on the Stubble =

Children's novel by Australian author Colin Thiele

- First edition (publ. Rigby, Adelaide)
- Author: Colin Thiele
- Language: English
- Genre: Children's
- Set in: South Australia
- Publisher: Rigby Limited
- Publication date: 1961
- Publication place: Australia
- Pages: 171
- Dewey Decimal: A823.3

The Sun on the Stubble is a novel by Colin Thiele, published in 1961.

== Synopsis ==
It tells the story of a German immigrant family living in rural South Australia during the 1930s. Colin Thiele was a South Australian educator and school principal.

Set in the Depression-era, 12-year-old Bruno Gunther lives with his family on a farm near the fictional town of Nagapalee. The novel follows Bruno's adventures around town and with his family before he is sent away to school in Adelaide, South Australia.

== Dedication ==
- Dedication: To the boys who were boys with me.

== Awards ==
- Children's Book of the Year Award: Older Readers commended, 1962

== Television series ==
The Sun on the Stubble was adapted in 1996 as a TV miniseries entitled "Sun on the Stubble" in Australia, directed by Robert Marchand, and known as "The Valley Between" overseas.

=== Cast ===
- Christian Kohlund as Marcus Gunther
- Jamie Croft as Bruno Gunther
- Sophie Heathcote as Lottie Gunther
- Susan Lyons as Ellie Gunther
- Mignon Kent as Anna Gunther
- Caroline Winnall as Emma Gunther
- Ann Burbrook as Miss Knightley
- Wynn Roberts as Ebeneezer Blitz
- Edwin Hodgeman as Mr Taylor

== See also ==
- South Australian Film Corporation
