= Sons of Cain =

Play written by David Williamson

- Written by: David Williamson
- Original language: English
- Genre: satirical comedy

Premiere
- Date premiered: March 1985
- Place premiered: Playhouse, Melbourne

Sons of Cain is a 1985 play by David Williamson about three female investigative reporters.

It looks at the New South Wales Labor government of the 1980s.

== Production ==
Williamson directed the original production himself, the first time he had done this with one of his own plays. He says he did five full drafts of the play over a period of six months.

The original production starred Max Cullen and was critically acclaimed. It was presented in London in 1986 by the Australian Elizabethan Theatre Trust.
