= Union Hall (Adelaide) =

Former university building in Adelaide, Australia

Coordinates: 34°55′06″S 138°36′17″E

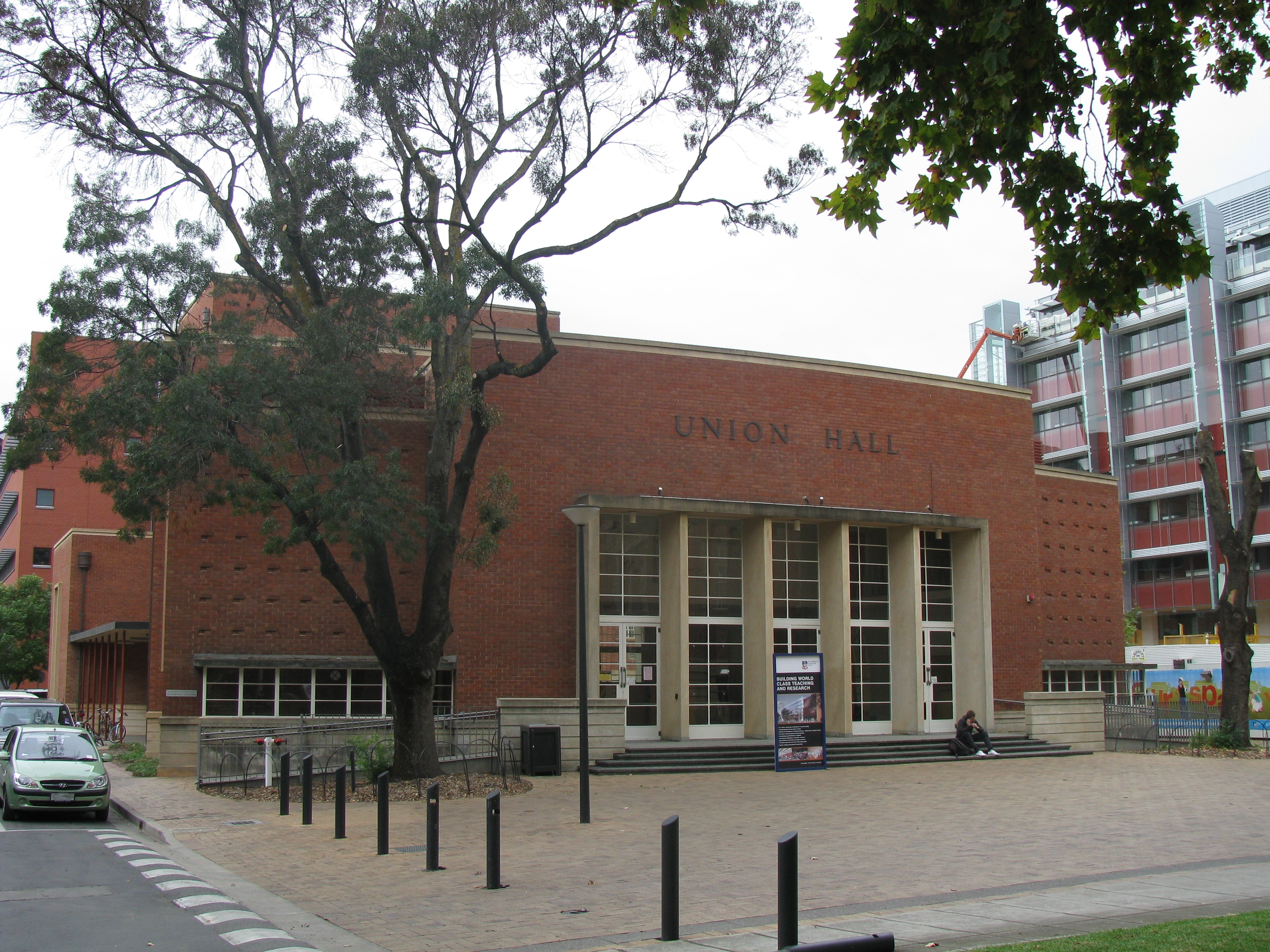
Union Hall in April 2010.

Union Hall was a theatre, hall and lecture theatre located on the North Terrace campus of the University of Adelaide, in South Australia. Constructed in 1958, Union Hall served as a performance venue for various festivals and productions until 2007. It was demolished in November 2010 to make way for a new science precinct.

== History ==
In 1955, in response to a shortage of student space on the North Terrace campus, the University of Adelaide began a public appeal for funds with which to renovate and expand the buildings of the Adelaide University Union (AUU). The appeal raised £103,761, with notable contributions including £6,000 from the AUU and £12,000 from Holden. The majority of these funds were set aside to erect a multi-purpose theatre for the Union's use. Designed by South Australian architect Louis Laybourne Smith, the building was named "Union Hall", and opened on 8 August 1958. The Hall was built with 499 seats, thereby avoiding an ordinance requiring a full-time fireman for buildings with seating capacity of 500 or more.

Union Hall was a venue for Adelaide's first Festival of the Arts in 1960 and the venue for the first 10 Adelaide Film Festivals, from 1959 to 1968.

There was a cafe/bar called "The Catacombs" operating in the basement of Union Hall in the 1970s and 1990s, which was popular with a more alternative crowd than the other bars in Union House. It never did particularly well, and closed a few times.

In 1999, control of Union Hall was handed from the AUU to the University, and the hall was renovated into a lecture theatre, in the process reducing its capacity to 415 seats. In 2007, the University ceased allowing the use of the hall for artistic and theatrical purposes, turning it into a full-time lecture theatre.

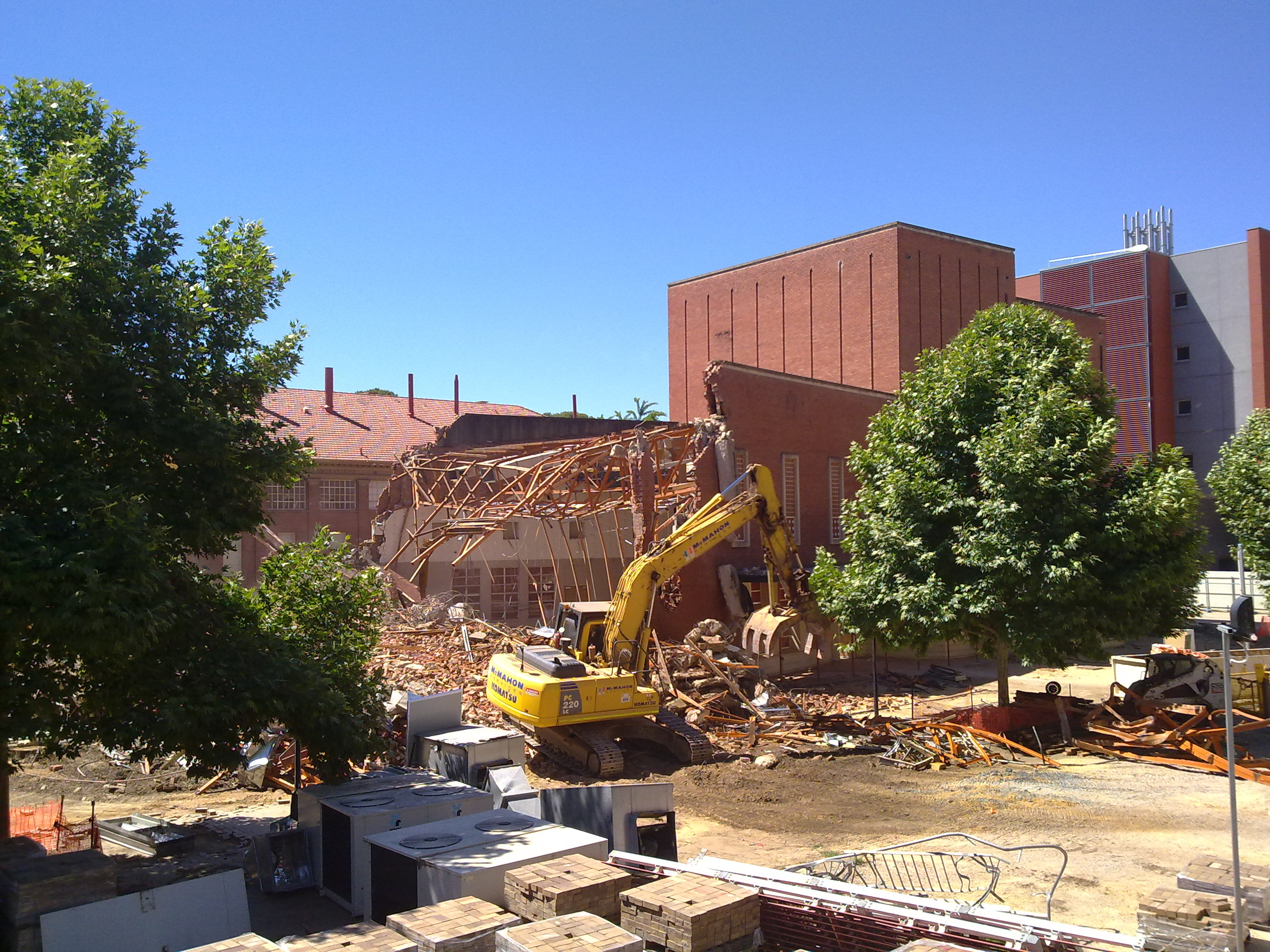
Union Hall being demolished in November 2010.

=== Demolition ===
In September 2009, the University of Adelaide announced that Union Hall would be demolished in order to construct a new science precinct centred on a proposed Institute for Photonics and Advanced Sensing. The announcement was met with opposition from the local arts community, the National Trust of South Australia, and the City of Adelaide. In February 2010, the hall was provisionally listed on the State Heritage Register, allowing for submissions from the public regarding the heritage status of the hall. However, in September, South Australian Minister for Environment and Conservation Paul Caica removed it from the register, and the hall was demolished between 17 and 26 November of the same year.

Construction started soon after, on the Bragg's building. It completed construction in 2013 and was inaugurated by the new Vice-Chancellor Warren Bebbington.

== The Hall ==
Union Hall was originally constructed to seat 499, with a stage 72 feet (22 m) from front to back and a proscenium arch of 38 feet (12 m). Under the stage was an extensive basement with dressing rooms, and electrical room and a workshop.
