= Gary Day (actor) =

New Zealand actor, playwright and lighting director

- Born: 10 November 1941 (age 85); Christchurch, New Zealand
- Occupations: Actor, writer
- Years active: 1960-2004 (as actor and playwright)
- Known for: Homicide, Murder Call
- Awards: Australia Film Institute Award

Gary Day (born 10 November 1941) is a New Zealand former actor, playwright and lighting director who has appeared in Australian television police drama series, including Homicide and Murder Call.

== Career ==
=== Television and theatre ===
Day worked as a male model and appeared in several television commercials. This led to guest roles in episodes of Skippy the Bush Kangaroo, police dramas The Link Men, The Long Arm, Homicide and Matlock Police produced by Crawford Productions. This culminated in the regular role of Senior Detective Phillip Redford in Crawford's series Homicide in 1973. Redford was a university graduate who had served as a bomb disposal expert in Vietnam, and was anti-violence as a result.

Day was the only cast member who appeared in all colour episodes of Homicide until it ceased production in 1975. Following this he appeared as a regular in Crawford's soap opera The Box as Marcus Boyd in 1977.

His other regular series role was as Detective Inspector Malcolm Thorne in Murder Call in 1997–98.

Guest roles include Cop Shop, Carson's Law, Blue Heelers, Halifax f.p., Dogs Head Bay.

He played the major supporting role of George Witton (to Terence Donovan's leading role of Harry 'Breaker' Morant) in the first public performance of Kenneth G. Ross's play Breaker Morant: A Play in Two Acts, presented by the Melbourne Theatre Company at the Athenaeum Theatre, in Melbourne, Victoria, Australia, on Thursday, 2 February 1978.

== Filmography ==
=== Television ===
Year	Title	Role	Notes	Availability
1960	The Adventures of the Terrible Ten	Guest role	TV series	
1969	Skippy	Mitch	TV seriEd, Season 2, episode 30: Plain Jane	Available on DVD
1970	The Link Men	Constable	TV series, Season 1, episode 10: Somebody's Kid is Missing	Available on DVD
1970	The Long Arm	Detective Emerson	TV series, Season 1, episode 1: The Lion Was the First to Know	Available on DVD
1972	Matlock Police	Norman Henderson	TV series, Season 2, episode 45: A Perfect Gentleman	Available on DVD
1972-77	Homicide	Senior Detective Phil Redford / Russell Thompson	TV series, 134 episodes	Available on DVD
1977	The Box	Marcus Lloyd	TV series, 1 episode	Available on DVD
1977-78	Cop Shop	Lyle Scott / Philip Stedman / Simon Hutton	TV series, 11 episodes	Available on DVD
1983	Carson's Law	Mr. Ward	TV series, episode: Happy Families	Available on DVD
1983	Home	Denny	TV series, Season 1, episode 21 & 22	
1984	Mortimer's Patch	John Marinovich	TV series, Season 3, episode 6: Nothing Changed	
1984	Inside Straight	Charles Morrison	TV series, Season 1, episode 2	
1986	The Great Bookie Robbery	Coilin Reynolds	TV miniseries	Available on DVD
1986	The Fast Lane	Keel	TV series, Season 2, episode 9	
1988	The Rainbow Warrior Conspiracy		TV miniseries	
1989	Mission: Impossible	Laroux	TV series, Season 1, episode 16	
1989	A Country Practice	Duncan Stevenson	TV series, Season 9, episodes 15 & 16	Available on DVD
1990	Come in Spinner	Nigel Carstairs	TV miniseries	Available on DVD
1990	Flair	Chuck	TV miniseries	Not Available
1990	The Great Air Race	Ray Parer	TV miniseries	
1991	Shark in the Park	Detective Sergeant Tyson	TV series, Season 3, episode 1	
1993	Snowy	Charlie Gillespie	TV series, episodes 6 & 11	Available on DVD
1994-2001	Blue Heelers	Commander Reginald Jones	TV series, Season 1, episode 8, & Season 8, episodes 27 & 28	Available on DVD
1995	Blue Murder	Bill Crofton	TV miniseries	Available on DVD
1996	Halifax f.p.	Sergeant Mick Snow	TV series, Season 1, Episode 7:Without Consent	Available on DVD
1996	The Bite	Coveney	TV miniseries	
1996	Twisted	Lowell	TV series, Season 1, Episode 11	
1997–2000	Murder Call	Detective Inspector Malcolm Thorne	TV series, 56 episodes	Available on DVD
1999	Dog's Head Bay	Stan Fairweather	TV series, Season 1, episode 11	
1999	Stingers	Edgar Voss	TV series, Season 2, episode 22	Available on DVD

=== Films ===
Year	Title	Role	Notes	Availability
1971	Three to Go	David (segment "Judy")	Short film	
1972	The Man Who Shot the Albatross		TV film	
1977	Raw Deal	Tyrone Leader	Feature film	
1977	The Mango Tree	Constable McHendry	Feature film	
1978	The Night Nurse	Rick	TV film	
1980	The Quick Brown Fox	Paul Sharmann		
1980	Departmental			
1980	Nightmares	Policeman #2	Feature film (aka Night Mares)	Available on DVD
1980	Going Home	Mike	Feature film	
1982	Duet for Four	Terry Byrne	Feature film	
1982	Crosstalk	Ed Ballinger	Feature film	Available on DVD
1983	Skin Deep	Ed Price	TV film	Available on DVD
1984	Death Warmed Up	Dr. Archer Howell	Feature film	Available on DVD
1985	Glass Babies	Brendan Keller	TV film	Available on DVD
1985	Natural Causes	Warren	TV film	
1985	Hanging Together	Craig	Feature film	
1986	Body Business	Nick Christopher	TV miniseries	
1987	The Surfer (aka Death Wave)	Sam Barlow	Feature film	
1987	Hard Knuckle	Topdog	TV film	
1989	A Sting in the Tale	Barry Robbins	Feature film	
1990	Harbour Beat	Gavin Walker	Miniseries	
1990	Jigsaw	Gordon Carroll	Feature film	
1991	The Girl from Mars	Virgil	Feature film	
1993	Corrupt Justice	Goodwin	Feature film	
1995	Tunnel Vision	Steve Docherty	Feature film	
1995	On the Dead Side		Feature film	
2002	Tempe Tip	Norman Crisp	Feature film	

== Awards ==
Year	Award	Category	TV show	Result
2001	Australian Film Institute Awards	Won Best Actor in a Guest Role in a TV Drama Series	Blue Heelers	Won
