= Andrew McFarlane (Australian actor) =

Australian actor

- Born: 1951 (age 74–75); Albany, Western Australia, Australia
- Occupations: Actor, television presenter
- Years active: 1971–present

Andrew McFarlane (born 1951) is an Australian actor with many stage, television, and film credits.

== Early life and education ==
McFarlane was born in Albany, Western Australia. The family moved to Brisbane in the 1960s, often taking long trips to Adelaide where his grandparents lived. His father was a cattle drover and McFarlane accompanied him to far west Queensland, droving, when he was eleven.

After the family relocated to Melbourne, McFarlane attended Camberwell Grammar School, where he was involved in school plays and school cadets.

McFarlane studied a Bachelor of Dramatic Art majoring in Acting, at Sydney's National Institute of Dramatic Art (NIDA), graduating in 1973, alongside actress Tina Bursill.

Crawfords police dramas Homicide and Matlock Police, McFarlane won a recurring role on Division 4, before joining World War II soap opera The Sullivans, as oldest son John Sullivan. He left the series after eighteen months and in the storyline John was reported missing in action – the writers left his final fate unresolved, in the hope McFarlane would return to the show. He returned to the role in the TV movie spinoff The John Sullivan Story. The role gained McFarlane a Sammy Award for Best Supporting Actor in a TV Series in 1977.

In 1977, McFarlane appeared in the Walt Disney family film Harness Fever, as Teddy's older brother Doone Boyd. It was released in UK cinemas in 1977 and again in mid 1978, under the name Born to Run. It wasn't released in Australia however, until 1979. The same year, it was split into two parts and shown on American television on NBC's The Wonderful World of Disney.

From 1979 to 1983, McFarlane had a lead role opposite Robert Coleby in action drama series Patrol Boat, as Lieutenant David Keating. During this time, he also appeared alongside an all-star cast in the 1982 World War I miniseries 1915, as Robert Gillen. A big budget production, the series was sold to over 40 countries, creating a demand for Australian programming in the US.

McFarlane took the lead role of Dr Tom Callaghan in the miniseries The Flying Doctors in 1985, reprising the role in the ongoing series that followed. He left the series after 16 episodes, at the height of its popularity in September 1986, but returned in the fifth season in August 1989 for a further 37 episodes, through to 1991. He also appeared in Rafferty's Rules as Police Prosecutor Gibson in 1988.

From 1995 to 1997, McFarlane had a regular role in children's fantasy adventure series Spellbinder, as Paul's widowed father and scientist, Dr Brian Reynolds. He also had a recurring role in New Zealand soap opera Shortland Street, as Bobby Wrightman jr in 1996, before playing Jeff Scheppers in teen series Heartbreak High the following year.

McFarlane began a long-running presenting role on children's series Play School in 2000, with a tenure of over 25 years to date. He then took on two soap opera characters, playing Ian Osbourne, the father of Tasha Andrews in Home and Away in 2004 and Izzy Hoyland's father, Bobby Hoyland in Neighbours in 2005. He also played Hugh Delaney in the drama series The Alice from 2005 to 2006.

In 2009, McFarlane portrayed prominent Australian anti-drugs campaigner and murder victim Donald Mackay in the second season of the Underbelly franchise, Underbelly: A Tale of Two Cities. He appeared in a musical for the first time in 2010, in Fame – The Musical at the Capitol Theatre, Sydney.

In 2014, McFarlane had a supporting role as Jim Miller in period drama series Love Child. He also had a recurring role, playing against type, as nefarious Dr Milson in post-war drama series A Place to Call Home. That same year, McFarlane played paedophile priest Father Marco Andrassi in the Foxtel miniseries Devil's Playground, alongside Toni Collette and Simon Burke. The series was devised as a sequel to the 1976 Fred Schepisi film of the same name, which also starred Burke. His portrayal earned him a win at the ASTRA Awards for Most Outstanding Performance in a TV Drama and an AACTA Award nomination for Best Guest or Supporting Actor in a Television Drama.

McFarlane next appeared as Dick Hibey in American political drama feature Truth, opposite Robert Redford and Cate Blanchett. The same year, he had a starring role in ABC's six-part supernatural drama series Glitch, portraying Vic Eastley. In 2016, he followed this with a main role as corrupt politician Geoff Matthews in Cleverman and regular parts in both The Code as Neil, and eight-part crime series Hyde & Seek as Stuart Flanagan. He then starred as Eric Whitley in Newton's Law in 2017.

In 2019, McFarlane appeared alongside Anna Torv, in series Secret City, as Air Chief Marshall Lockwood, a character involved in a political cover-up. 2023 saw McFarlane perform in a Sydney Theatre Company production of Hubris & Humiliation which earned him a win for Best Performance in a Supporting Role in a Mainstage Production at the Sydney Theatre Awards. In 2025, he reunited with Torv in drama series The Newsreader, playing the recurring role of media mogul Richard Bertrand.

Most recently, McFarlane has starred in 2025 American miniseries Spartacus: House of Ashur, portraying Gabinius, a corrupt Roman senator. He played Charles Mallory in David Williamson's The Social Ladder at Sydney’s Ensemble Theatre from January to March 2026.

== Personal life ==
McFarlane has long been open about his homosexuality.

== Awards ==
Year	Award	Category	Work	Result	Ref.
1977	Sammy Award	Best Supporting Actor in a TV series	The Sullivans	Won	
2014	ASTRA Award	Most Outstanding Performance in a TV Drama	Devil's Playground	Won	
2015	AACTA Award	Best Guest or Supporting Actor in a Television Drama	Devil's Playground	Nominated	
2023	Sydney Theatre Award	Best Performance in a Supporting Role in a Mainstage Production	Hubris & Humiliation	Won	

== Filmography ==
=== Film ===
Year	Title	Role	Notes	Ref.
1976	Break of Day	Tom Cooper	Feature film	
1981	Doctors & Nurses	Milligan	Feature film	
1985	I Can't Get Started	Freddy	Feature film	
1988	Boulevard of Broken Dreams	Jonathan Lovell	Feature film	
2007	Razzle Dazzle: A Journey into Dance	Trevor Morgan	Feature film	
2009	Bourke Boy	John	Short film	
2012	Shadow Valley	Pastor Todd	Short film	
2015	Truth	Dick Hibey	Feature film	
2015	Library of Love	The Duke	Short film	
2018	Joy Boy	Pastor Ted	Short film	

=== Television ===
Year	Title	Role	Notes	Ref.
1972	Homicide	Man	1 episode	
1974	Matlock Police	Ben Reid	Episode: "Poppy & the Closet Junkie"	
1974	Rush	Drake	Episode: "Lament the Days That Are Gone By"	
1974–1975	Division 4	Constable Roger Wilson	Recurring role	
1975	Certain Women	Leigh Sheldon	1 episode	
1975	Behind the Legend		1 episode	
1976–1982	The Sullivans	John Sullivan	Recurring role	
1977	Born to Run (aka Harness Fever)	Doone Boyd	TV film	
1978	Case for the Defence	Johnny	Episode: "Made for Each Other"	
1979	The John Sullivan Story	John Sullivan	TV film	
1979–1983	Patrol Boat	Lieutenant David Keating	Main role, 26 episodes	
1981	Cop Shop	Graham Carter / 'Fancy' Phil Burns	4 episodes	
1982	1915	Robert Gillen	Miniseries, 5 episodes	
1985	The Flying Doctors	Dr. Tom Callaghan	Miniseries, 3 episodes	
1986–1991	The Flying Doctors	Dr. Tom Callaghan	Main role, 71 episodes	
1988	Barracuda (aka The Rocks)	Det Sgt Mark Castelli	TV film	
1988	Rafferty's Rules	Gibson	10 episodes	
1993	Time Trax	George Whitman	Episode: "Fire & Ice"	
1993	Paradise Beach	Gordon		
1993	G.P.	Malcolm Henderson	Episode: "Living with the Past"	
1994	Halifax f.p.	Owen Toser	Episode: "Acts of Betrayal"	
1995–1996	Spellbinder	Dr Brian Reynolds	Main role, 26 episodes	
1996	Shortland Street	Bobby Wrightman jr	18 episodes	
1996	Little White Lies	Mark Lynch	TV film	
1997	Heartbreak High	Jeff Scheppers	Recurring role, 5 episodes	
1998	The Violent Earth	Tom Sutton	Miniseries, 2 episodes	
1998	The Day of the Roses	Public Servant	Miniseries, 2 episodes	
1999	All Saints	David Miller	Episodes: "Truth & Consequences: Part 1 & 2"	
1999	Murder Call	Adrian MacKerras	Episode: "Dead Offerings"	
1999	Blue Heelers	Mark Powers	Episode: "The Price of Silence"	
1999	Airtight	Conrad	TV film	
2000	Tales of the South Seas		Miniseries, 1 episode	
2000; 2001	Water Rats	Patrick Kernaghan / Doug McLaren	2 episodes	
2000–2025	Play School	Host		
2002	Heroes' Mountain	Mike Sodergren	TV film	
2002	Crash Palace	Prosecutor	1 episode	
2003	Tempted	Mike	TV film	
2004	The Alice	Hugh Delaney	TV film	
2004	Through My Eyes	John Phillips Q.C.	Miniseries, 2 episodes	
2004	Home and Away	Ian Osbourne	2 episodes	
2005	Neighbours	Bobby Hoyland	Recurring role, 20 episodes	
2005	Blue Water High	Warren	Episode: "Timing is Everything"	
2005–2006	The Alice	Hugh Delaney	Miniseries, main role, 22 episodes	
2008	Emerald Falls	Dr. Henry Forbes	TV film	
2008	Dream Life	Daniel	TV film	
2009	Underbelly: A Tale of Two Cities	Donald Mackay	1 episode	
2012	Singapore 1942 End of Empire	Lt. Colonel Ian Stewart	Documentary	
2012	Guess How Much I Love You	Big Nutbrown Hare / Otter (voice)	Animated series, episode: "Treasure Hunt"	
2014	Rake	Marriage Priest	1 episode	
2014	Love Child	Jim Millar	Season 1, 3 episodes	
2014	Janet King	Keith Nelson	3 episodes	
2014	A Place to Call Home	Dr. Milson	4 episodes	
2014	Devil's Playground	Father Marco Andrassi	Miniseries; ASTRA Award for Most Outstanding Performance by an Actor	
2015–2017	Glitch	Vic Eastley	8 episodes	
2016	Black Comedy	Guest	Episode 2.4	
2016	Cleverman	Geoff Matthews	Main role, 6 episodes	
2016	The Code	Neil	Regular role, 6 episodes	
2016	Hyde & Seek	Stuart Flanagan	Minister, 3 episodes	
2017	Newton's Law	Eric Whitley Q.C.	Miniseries, main role, 8 episodes	
2017	Seven Types of Ambiguity	Donald Sheere	Miniseries, 3 episodes	
2017	Pulse	Mack	2 episodes	
2018	Riot	Neville Wran	TV film	
2019	Secret City: Under the Eagle	Air Chief Marshal Wes Lockwood	6 episodes	
2020	Between Two Worlds	Gareth König	3 episodes	
2022	It's Fine I'm Fine	Henry	1 episode	
2023	The Lost Flowers of Alice Hart	Dr. Harris	Miniseries, 1 episode	
2023	Mother and Son	Principal Worstin	1 episode	
2025	The Newsreader	Richard Bertrand	5 episodes	
2025	My Life Is Murder	Graydon	2 episodes	
2025–2026	Spartacus: House of Ashur	Gabinius	10 episodes	

== Theatre ==
Year	Title	Role	Notes	Ref.
1971	The Trial of Lucullus	King	NIDA Theatre, Sydney	
1971	Keep Tightly Closed in a Cool Dry Place		Jane St Theatre, Sydney	
1971	Hippolytus		UNSW Old Tote Parade Theatre, Sydney with NIDA	
1972	A Country Girl		UNSW Old Tote Parade Theatre, Sydney with NIDA	
1972	Noah		NIDA Theatre, Sydney	
1972	The Serpent		Woollahra Arts Centre, Sydney with NIDA	
1973	The Clandestine Marriage	Thomas	NIDA Theatre, Sydney	
1973	The Devils	Father Rangier	NIDA Theatre, Sydney	
1973	An Eighteenth Century Soirée		UNSW Old Tote Parade Theatre, Sydney with NIDA	
1973	Cooper and Borges	Flook / Cenci	Jane St Theatre, Sydney with NIDA	
1973	Oh, What a Lovely War!		NIDA, Sydney	
1975	Chez Nous		Parade Theatre, Sydney with Old Tote Theatre Company	
1975	The Importance of Being Earnest		Sydney Opera House with Old Tote Theatre Company	
1975	Ivanov		Sydney Opera House with Old Tote Theatre Company	
1978	The Club	Geoff	Playhouse, Perth with Parachute Productions	
1979	The Day After the Fair	Charles Bradford	Comedy Theatre, Melbourne, Theatre Royal Sydney	
1980–1981	Cyrano De Bergerac	Christian	Sydney Opera House with STC	
1981	Cat on a Hot Tin Roof	Brick	SGIO Theatre, Brisbane with QTC	
1984	2001 – A Postcode		Kinselas, Sydney	
1985	The Glass Menagerie	Tom	Phillip St Theatre, Sydney	
1988	A Chorus of Disapproval	Guy Jones	Playhouse, Perth with Western Australian Theatre Company	
1988	Interplay '88		International Festival of Young Playwrights at Sydney Opera House	
1989	The Normal Heart	Bruce	Wharf Theatre, Sydney with STC	
1990; 1992	Love Letters	Andrew Makepeace Ladd III	Playhouse, Melbourne, Tasmania	
1990	A Month in the Country	Ratkin	Suncorp Theatre, Brisbane with QTC	
1990	A Christmas Carol		Marian St Theatre, Sydney	
1991	Henry IV, Part One	King Henry	Wharf Theatre, Sydney, Blackfriars Theatre, London with STC	
1991	King Lear	Edgar	Wharf Theatre, Sydney with STC	
1992	The Heidi Chronicles	Peter Patrone	Cremorne Theatre, Brisbane with QTC	
1992	Gulliver's Travels	Lemuel Gulliver	Playhouse, Melbourne, Ford Theatre, Geelong with MTC	
1993	Talley's Folly	Matt Friedman	Les Currie Entertainment	
1993	Taking Steps	Roland	Playhouse, Adelaide with STCSA	
1994	Two Weeks with the Queen	Dad / Uncle Bob / Griff / Doctor	Cremorne Theatre, Brisbane, Glen St Theatre, Sydney with STC	
1995	Emerald City	Colin	Ensemble Theatre, Sydney	
1995	Private Lives	Victor	Wellington Opera House with Gary Penny Productions	
1996	Wait Until Dark	Roat	Majestic Cinemas, Sydney	
1996	The Rover	Wilmore	Playhouse, Melbourne with MTC	
1996	Memorial to George Fairfax AM Hon LLD		St Paul's Cathedral, Melbourne	
1996	Tales of a Faerie Called Angel	Max	Wharf Theatre, Sydney with Latent Image Productions	
1998	Blinded by the Sun	Christopher	Sydney Opera House with Ensemble Theatre	
1999	Corporate Vibes	Michael	Sydney Opera House, Playhouse, Brisbane with QTC, Playhouse, Melbourne with MTC, Sydney Opera House with STC	
2000	Summer of the Seventeenth Doll	Roo	Albury Convention & Performing Arts Centre with Railway St Theatre Company	
2000	Mozart by Moonlight			
2001	Dinner with Friends	Gabe	Marian St Theatre, Sydney	
2001	The Graduate	Mr Braddock	Theatre Royal Sydney with The Really Useful Group	
2002	After the Ball	Stephen McCrae	Ensemble Theatre, Sydney	
2002	Talking Heads	Graham	Australian tour with Hit Productions	
2003	Myth, Propaganda and Disaster in Nazi Germany and Contemporary America	Jack	Griffin Theatre Company	
2005	Love Letters	Andrew Makepeace Ladd III	NIDA Parade Theatre, Sydney	
2006	Losing Louis	Reggie	Ensemble Theatre	
2006	Woman in Mind	Doctor Bill	Sydney Opera House with STC	
2006	Play School Live in Concert	Narrator	Kids Promotions	
2007	Who's Afraid of Virginia Woolf?	George	QPAC, Brisbane with QTC	
2008	Scarlett O'Hara at the Crimson Parrot	Steve	Playhouse, Melbourne with MTC	
2009	Let the Sunshine	Ron	Ensemble Theatre, Sydney & NSW/VIC/ACT tour	
2010	West Australian Symphony Orchestra	Presenter	Kings Park, Perth	
2010	Fame – The Musical	Mr Myers / Resident Director	Regent Theatre, Melbourne, Lyric Theatre, Brisbane, Capitol Theatre, Sydney with Gordon Frost Organisation	
2011	Nothing Personal	Kelvin	Ensemble Theatre, Sydney	
2011	Death and the Maiden		Independent Theatre, Sydney	
2012	Arcadia	Bernhard Nightingale	Heath Ledger Theatre, Perth with BSSTC, Perth	
2012	The Heretic	Professor Kevin Maloney	Southbank Theatre, Melbourne with MTC	
2012	I Want to Sleep with Tom Stoppard	Tom	Tamarama Rock Surfers, Sydney	
2013	Dreams in White	Michael Devine / Ray Wimple	Griffin Theatre Company, Sydney	
2014	The Seagull	Doctor Dorn	BSSTC, Perth	
2015	Deathtrap	Sidney Bruhl	Darlinghurst Theatre, Sydney	
2016	Quartet	Reginald Paget	Playhouse, Brisbane & regional QLD tour with QTC	
2016	The Hansard Monologues: Age of Entitlement		Glen St Theatre, Sydney, York Theatre, Sydney, Bruce Gordon Theatre, Wollongong, Old Parliament House, Canberra	
2019	Mary Stuart	Leicester	Roslyn Packer Theatre, Sydney with STC	
2020	Family Values	Roger	Stables Theatre, Sydney with Griffin Theatre Company	
2022	Grand Horizons	Understudy	Roslyn Packer Theatre, Sydney with STC	
2022	Love Letters	Andrew Makepeace Ladd III	Ensemble Theatre, Sydney	
2023	Hubris & Humiliation	Roland McNamara	Wharf Theatre, Sydney with STC	
2025	The Talented Mr Ripley	Mr Greenleaf	Roslyn Packer Theatre, Sydney, Playhouse, Melbourne with STC	
2026	The Social Ladder	Charles Mallory	Ensemble Theatre, Sydney	

== Radio ==
Year	Title	Role	Notes	Ref.
2009	Amadeus	Antonio Salieri	4MBSFM	
