= Kate Raison =

Australian actress (born 1962)

- Born: Katherine Raison; 2 February 1962 (age 64)
- Occupation: Television actor
- Years active: 1985–2014, 2019–
- Known for: A Country Practice (TV series) Cathy Hayden; E Street (TV series) as Sheriden Sturgess; Pacific Drive (TV series) as Georgina Ellis
- Notable work: Home and Away as various Neighbours as Claudia Watkins (recurring)

Katherine Raison (born 2 February 1962) is an Australian actress, best known for her roles on television and film, predominantly her numerous roles in soap operas.

== Career ==
Raison starred in A Country Practice from 1987 to 1990 as Cathy Hayden, E Street from 1991 to 1992 as Sheriden Sturgess, and Pacific Drive from 1995 to 1996 as Georgina Ellis

Raison has also appeared in Home and Away, Farscape and All Saints.

In early 2019, Raison began playing a recurring role in long-running series Neighbours. Her character, Claudia Watkins, the cold, estranged mother of established character Finn Kelly (Rob Mills), initially appeared in 6 episodes. She returned for another guest stint in December 2019 during which she causes problems for Elly Conway (Jodi Anasta), the mother of her baby granddaughter to her other son, the then missing and presumed deceased, Shaun Watkins (Brad Moller). Raison returned for a third stint in Neighbours in April 2020 following the death of Finn Kelly. During this stint, her character, goes for custody of her baby granddaughter, and discovers her youngest son, Shaun, is still alive.

== Filmography ==
=== Film ===
Year	Title	Role	Type
1986	For Love Alone	English Waitress	Feature film
1987	Going Sane	Nosh	Feature film
1993	Encounters (aka Voyage into Fear)	Madaline Carr	Feature film
1994	Ebbtide	Ann Blackmore	Feature film
2006	Checkpoint	Rebecca	Film Short
2011	Soulmate	Role unknown	Film Short
2018	Bring Me Back, Ma	Beth	Film Short
2019	Being Gavin	Elaine	Feature film

=== Television ===
Year	Title	Role	Type
1985	Sons and Daughters	Guest role: Nurse	TV series, 1 episode
1987	A Country Practice	Guest role: Darlene McCoy	TV series, 1 episode
1987–1990	A Country Practice	Regular role: Cathy Hayden	TV series, 236 episodes
1990	Home and Away	Recurring role: Jennifer Atkinson	TV series, 16 episodes
1990–1992	E Street	Regular role: Sheridan Sturgess	TV series, season 2-4, 124 episodes
1993	Butterfly Island	Guest role	TV series, 1 episode
1995	Over the Hill	Guest role	TV series, 1 episode
1995–1997	Pacific Drive	Regular role: Georgina Ellis	TV series
1996	Home and Away: The Official Summer Bay Special	Jennifer Atkinson (uncredited)	Video
1998, 2023	Home and Away	Guest role: Paula Rogers	TV series, 1 episode
1999	Farscape	Guest role: Pa'u Tahleen	TV series, 1 episode
2000; 2009	All Saints	Guest role: Julie Campbell	TV series, 1 episode
2000	Murder Call	Guest role: Abigail Easton	TV series, 1 episode
2001	Outriders	Regular role: Tori Konrad	TV series, 26 episodes
2001	Head Start	Guest role: Claudia	TV series (1 episode)
2002	Superfire	Beth Perkins	TV film, GERMANY / CANADA / NZ / US
2009	All Saints	Recurring Guest role: Kathy Whittaker	TV series, 1 episodes
2014-2015	Wonderland	Recurring guest role: Katherine Barnes	TV series, 3 episodes
2019–2020	Neighbours	Recurring role: Claudia Watkins	TV series, 16 episodes
2023	Home and Away	Nicola Carter	TV series, 2 episodes

=== Television appearances (as self) ===
Year	Title	Role	Type
1992; 1997; 2003	Good Morning Australia	Herself - Guest	TV series, 3 episodes
1992	In Sydney Today	Herself - Guest	TV series, 1 episode
1992; 2012	The Morning Show	Herself - Guest	TV series, 2 episodes
1992	The World Tonight	Herself	TV series, 1 episode ("Beauty and the Beast" segment
1992	Vidiot	Herself	TV series, 1 episode
1992	Tonight Live with Steve Vizard	Herself - Guest	TV series, 1 episode
1992	What's Cooking	Herself - Guest	TV series, 1 episode
1992	The Midday Show	Herself - Guest	TV series, 1 episode
1992	The Main Event	Herself	TV series, 1 episode
1992	Melbourne International Comedy Festival	Herself	TV special
2014	Studio 10	Herself - Guest	TV series, 1 episode
2015; 2018	The Daily Edition	Herself - Guest	TV series, 2 episodes

== Stage ==
Year	Title	Role	Notes
1985	The School for Scandal		
1986	The Marginal Farm		Ensemble Theatre
1986	Big River		Ensemble Studios Repertory Theatre
1986	Barefoot in the Park		Ensemble Theatre
1986	Never in my Lifetime		Ensemble Theatre
1989	A Night In Julia Creek		
1989	Road		
1990	Daylight Saving		Bridge Theatre, Coniston & Adelaide
1990	Illusions		Ensemble Theatre, Iron Cove Theatre, Sydney
1991	Love Letters	Melissa Gardner	
1991	A Shayna Maidel		Ensemble Theatre
1992	The Heidi Chronicles		Ensemble Theatre
1992	Man of the Moment		Seymour Centre
1993	The Adman		Ensemble Theatre
1994	The Girl's Gotta Eat		Subiaco Theatre Centre
1997	Wrong for Each Other	Norah	Ensemble Theatre
2000	Alarms and Excursions		Ensemble Theatre
2002	The Vagina Monologues		
2002	After the Ball		Ensemble Theatre
2003	Birthrights	Helen	Sydney Opera House, Riverside Theatres Parramatta
2005	Chapter Two	Faye	Ensemble Theatre, Parade Theatre
2006	Charitable Intent	Bryony	Ensemble Theatre
2007	Stella by Starlight	Geraldine	Ensemble Theatre
2008	Mary Stuart	Mary, Queen of Scots	Ensemble Theatre
2009	Let the Sunshine	Natasha	Ensemble Theatre, The Street Theatre, Acton, Q Theatre Penrith, Manning Entertainment Centre, Seymour Centre, Geelong Performing Arts Centre
2010	Ninety	Isabel	Ensemble Theatre
2011	At Any Cost?	Katie	The J Theatre, Noosa Heads, Ensemble Theatre
2012	The Gingerbread Lady	Eva Meara	Ensemble Theatre
2014	Dark Voyager	Joan Crawford	Ensemble Theatre
2015; 2016	The Good Doctor (A Defenceless Creature and Too Late for Happiness)	Mrs. Shtchukin /	Ensemble Theatre, Glen Street Theatre
2016	The Shadow Box	Beverley	Old Fitzroy Theatre
2017; 2019	Two	Landlady / Old Woman / Maudie / Mrs Iger / Lesley / Alice / Woman	Ensemble Theatre, QUT, Glen Street Theatre
2018	After the Ball		
2018	Torch Song Trilogy	Ma Beckoff	Darlinghurst Theatre
2018; 2022	Killing Katie: Confessions of a Book Club	Robyn	Ensemble Theatre
2022	Heroes of the Fourth Turning	Gina Presson	Seymour Centre
2024	The Great Divide	Penny Poulter	Ensemble Theatre, The Pavilion Performing Arts Centre

== Personal life ==
Raison is married to fellow Australian actor Brian Meegan, with whom she has starred with in several plays, and together they are patrons of the Ensemble Theatre in Sydney. They share a daughter, Hannah-Rae Meegan.
