= Peter Phelps =

Australian actor

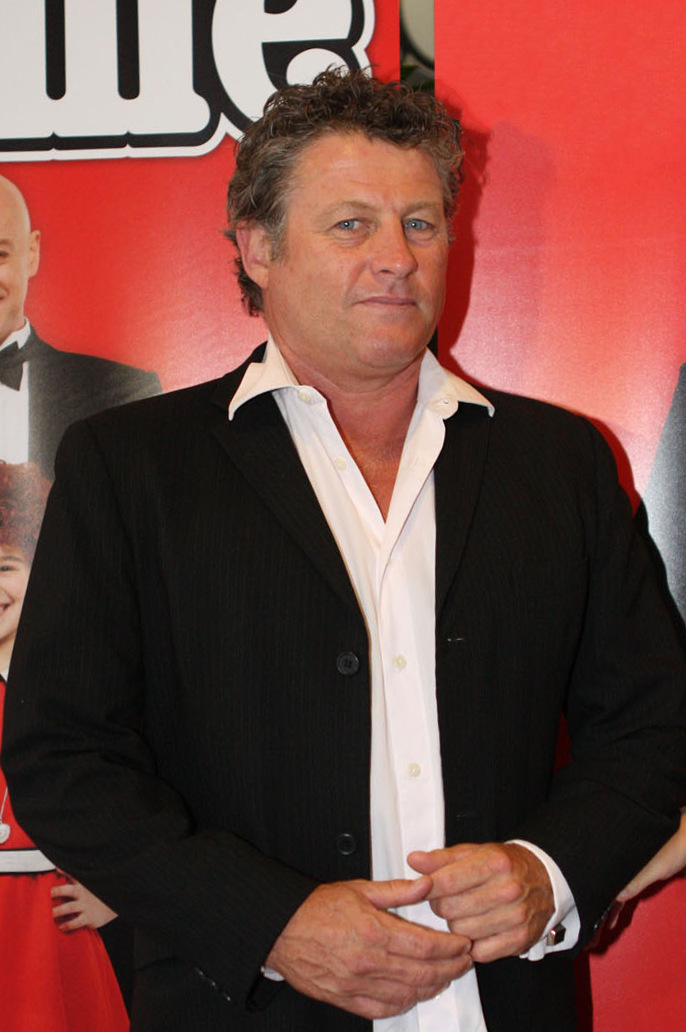
- Phelps in 2012
- Born: 20 September 1960 (age 66); Sydney, New South Wales, Australia
- Occupations: Actor, singer, writer
- Years active: 1977−present
- Known for: John Palmer in Sons and Daughters; Trevor Cole in Baywatch; Peter Church in Stingers
- Spouse: Donna Fowkes (2000–present)
- Children: Aja Blue Phelps (b. 2002); Polly Elsie Rose Phelps (b. 2005)
- Parent(s): George Thomas Phelps; Shirley Amy Gunston
- Relatives: Kerryn Phelps (sister); Bryan Robson (cousin)
- Awards: AFI: Best Actor in a Television Drama 1993; Logie: Most Popular Actor 2002.
- Website: peterphelps.com.au

Peter Phelps (born 20 September 1960 in Sydney) is an Australian actor, singer and writer. He is notable for his role as Trevor Cole in Baywatch. Phelps is also known for his roles in the internationally successful Australian series Sons and Daughters and Stingers and has appeared in feature films including Blackwater Trail with Judd Nelson. He is the brother of Professor Kerryn Phelps.

== Career ==
Phelps began his acting career in the early 1980s with an ongoing role in the Network Ten teen soap opera The Restless Years produced by the Reg Grundy Organisation. After the series ended he had a starring role in new Grundy soap opera Sons and Daughters. It was Phelps who came up with the 'Pat the Rat' moniker in the series.

In 1988, he had a brief role in the miniseries The Dirtwater Dynasty. Peter featured as David Eastwick, the first-born son of the main character Richard Eastwick, played by Hugo Weaving (who is fewer than six months older than Phelps).

From 1989 to 1990, Phelps played one of the lifeguards (Trevor Cole) in the first season of Baywatch, and had a minor role as a surfer in the film Point Break. He also had roles in A Country Practice and The Flying Doctors. In 1993, Phelps won an Australian Film Institute Best Actor Award for his role in the G.P. episode, "Exposed".

From 1998 until 2004, he starred in Stingers – a role that won him the 2002 Logie Award for Most Popular Actor.

Phelps also played a recurring role as doctor Doug 'Spence' Spencer on the medical drama All Saints, starting 4 October 2005.

In 2009, Phelps appeared in two television dramas – Underbelly: A Tale of Two Cities, playing Detective Inspector Joe Messina; and as Vince Marchello (Station Co-ordinator) in Rescue: Special Ops. The same year, he also had a role as a police officer in the film Stone Bros.

In 2009, he appeared in a new public awareness campaign by the NSW Rural Fire Service about the need to prepare for bushfires. The campaign included both television and radio advertisements and was subsequently adopted by the Tasmania Fire Service.

In 2021, Phelps appeared in Channel 7’s series Australia's Sexiest Tradie.

In 2023 Phelps appeared in Channel 7 soap Home and Away as Gary Morrow. Phelps also appeared in the theatre play La Cage aux Folles. Phelps in 2024 appeared in 7plus series Roast Night which was written by his co-star Rick Donald. Phelps was later announced to appear in ABC series Return to Paradise.

== Personal life ==
In 2015, Phelps was one of many victims who were scammed by financial advisor Brad Sherwin who stole more than $400,000 of Phelps' superannuation.

== Acting credits ==
=== Television ===
Year	Title	Role	Notes
1981–1982	The Restless Years	Kevin Ryan	6 episodes
1981–1993	A Country Practice	Chris / Hector / Jeff	10 episodes
1982–1984	Sons and Daughters	John Palmer	421 episodes
1984	The Cowra Breakout	Terry Moyes	Miniseries, 5 episodes
1986	Prime Time		TV series
1986–1987	The Challenge	Will Baillieu	Miniseries, 2 episodes
1988	Australians	Les Darcy	Anthology series, episode 1: "Les Darcy"
1988	The Dirtwater Dynasty	David Eastwick	Miniseries, 5 episodes
1988	Rock 'N' Roll Cowboys	Eddie	TV movie
1989	Baywatch: Panic at Malibu Pier	Trevor Cole	TV movie
1989–1990	Baywatch	Trevor Cole	21 episodes
1990	Rafferty's Rules	James Frederick	1 episode
1992	Chances	David Hensen	1 episode
1992	The Young Riders	Hack Wilkins	1 episode
1993	G.P.	Sam Hill	1 episode
1993–1994	R.F.D.S	Dennis Taylor	13 episodes
1994	Heartbreak High	Phil North	4 episodes
1995	Fire	Nick Connor	13 episodes
1995	Blue Murder	Graham 'Abo' Henry	Miniseries, 2 episodes
1996	Police Rescue	Alex Willis	3 episodes
1996	The Feds: Betrayal	Brian Petrie	TV movie
1997	One Way Ticket	Mick Webb	TV movie
1997	Reprisal	Borodin	TV movie
1998	Water Rats	Jimmy Formica	3 episodes
1998–2004	Stingers	Peter Church	192 episodes
2005–2007	All Saints	Doug Spencer	16 episodes
2006	Small Claims: The Reunion	Paul Lloyd	TV movie
2007	Chandon Pictures	Eddie Connolly	2 episodes
2009	Underbelly: A Tale of Two Cities	Detective Inspector Joe Messina	13 episodes
2009–2011	Rescue: Special Ops	Vince Marchello	48 episodes
2012, 2022–present	Home and Away	Alan Henderson / Gary Morrow	28 episodes
2013	Mr & Mrs Murder	Paul Craven	1 episode
2013–2015	Wonderland	Warwick Wilcox	23 episodes
2014	Modern Family	Wise Australian	1 episode
2014	Old School	Malcolm Dwyer	8 episodes
2017	Blue Murder: Killer Cop	Graham 'Abo' Henry	1 episode
2019	Blue Water Empire	Commanding Officer	TV series
2019	Les Norton	Mick Matthews	1 episode
2020	Drunk History Australia	Lee Robinson / Olympic Crowd	1 episode
2021	Australia's Sexiest Tradie	Boss Man Wayne	6 episodes
2024	Roast Night	Wayne Turner	6 episodes
2024	Return to Paradise	Vince	TV series, 1 episode
2024	Plum	Mo Hanlon	2 episodes
2025	Optics	Rob Ryan	TV series

=== Film ===
Year	Title	Role	Notes
1983	Undercover	Theo	
1986	Playing Beatie Bow	Judah Bow / Robert Bow	
1987	The Lighthorsemen	Dave Mitchell	
1987	Starlight Hotel	Patrick	
1988	Breaking Loose: Summer City II	Ross Cameron	
1989	Maya	Peter	
1991	Point Break	Aussie Surfer	
1993	Merlin	John Pope	
1995	Rough Diamonds	Dozer Brennan	
1995	Blackwater Trail	Frank	
1996	Zone 39	Leo Megaw	
2001	Lantana	Patrick Phelan	
2002	Teesh and Trude	Rod	
2003	Ned Kelly	Constable Lonigan	
2006	Footy Legends	Billy Major	
2007	Without Warrant	The Buyer	
2008	The Square	Jake	
2008	Forever Strong	Referee	
2009	Stone Bros.	The 'New Age' Copper	
2010	Caught Inside	Skipper Joe	
2016	Embedded	Cassidy	
2016	Drone	Blake	
2019	Locusts	Sgt Harvey	
2021	Beverley		Short film
2021	Him	Neil Espers	

=== Stage ===
Year	Title	Role	Notes
1983–1985	The Life and Adventures of Nicholas Nickleby	Master Percy Crummles / Alphonse / Westwood	Theatre Royal Sydney, State Theatre, Melbourne, Festival Theatre, Adelaide with The Australian Opera, STC, MTC & J. C. Williamson's
1985	The Club		Phillip Street Theatre, Sydney
1992	The Sum of Us	Jeff Mitchell	Wharf Theatre, Sydney with STC
1995	Miranda by Stephen Sewell	Frank	Wharf Theatre, Sydney with East Coast Theatre Company
2004	Twelve Angry Men	Juror 4	Playhouse, Brisbane, Sydney Theatre, Melbourne Athenaeum with Adrian Bohm Presents & Arts Projects Australia
2005	Love Letters	Andrew Makepeace III	NIDA Parade Theatre, Sydney
2011	Stainless Steel Rat	Film Producer	Seymour Centre, Sydney with Wayne Harrison's Cheep
2012	Let the Sunshine	Ron	NSW & SA regional tour with HIT Productions & Playing Australia
2014	Cruise Control	Darren Brodie	Ensemble Theatre, Sydney
2014	A Conversation	Uncle Bob	The Concourse, Sydney
2023	La Cage aux Folles	Edouard Dindon	Playhouse, Melbourne with David M. Hawkins & Arts Centre Melbourne

== Awards and nominations ==
Year	Category	Award	Series	Result
1993	AFI Award	Best Actor in a Leading Role in a TV Drama	G.P.	Won
2002	FCCA Award	Best Male Supporting Actor	Lantana	Nominated
2002	Logie Awards	Most Popular Actor	Stingers	Won
2014	Equity Ensemble Awards	Outstanding Performance by an Ensemble in a Drama Series	Wonderland	Nominated

== Writings ==
=== Books ===
- Sex without Madonna: The True Confessions of a Hired Gun in Tinseltown (autobiography), Pan Macmillan Publishers Australia, 1994
- The Bulldog Track: A grandson's story of an ordinary man's war and survival on the other Kokoda trail, Hachette Australia, 2018

=== Magazine contributor ===
- Harper's Bazaar
