= Face to Face (play) =

2000 play by Australian playwright David Williamson

- Written by: David Williamson
- Original language: English

Premiere
- Date premiered: 1999

Face to Face is a play by Australian playwright David Williamson that premiered in 1999. It is part of the Jack Manning Trilogy (Face to Face (1999), A Conversation (2001), Charitable Intent (2001) which take as their subject community conferencing, a new form of restorative justice in Australia, which Wiliamson became interested in the late 1990s and early 2000s. The story concerns Glen, a young construction worker, who rams into the back of his former boss's Mercedes in a fit of anger at being sacked; he is given the opportunity to discuss his actions in a community conference, rather than going straight to court.

The play was inspired by the Maoris’ use of a method of community justice in New Zealand, bringing together the victim and perpetrator for conferencing. The play sees a convener bring together a sacked employee, his boss, family, friends and fellow workers for a community conference. It was based in part on four real conferences.

The play favourably compares community conferencing to the Australian court system, which it portrays as rigid and unfair.

== Characters ==
Jack Manning, a community conference convener, has interviewed each of the characters before the play. He is intelligent, discerning, skilled and experienced. He acts as a commentator rather than facilitator, paraphrasing and making suggestions to participants. He is married and has four kids.

Glen Tragaskis is in his mid-twenties. It is implied that he is mentally handicapped in some way. In the conference it is mentioned that he constantly boasts about women to impress his friends. He explains that he was fired as a result of being pranked by friends and coworkers, who told him that his boss's assistant, Julie, and later Therese, was interested in him. After he realises he is being fooled, Glen seeks out the coworkers responsible. He assaults his foreman Richard even though Richard only knew of the pranks but was not responsible. Shortly after this, Glen's boss Greg fires him, and then Glen rams into the back of Greg's Mercedes in a fit of anger at being sacked. It is revealed that Glen was physically abused by his father, who eventually killed himself after a conversation. Glen is childish, gullible and dangerous when angry.

Maureen Tragaskis, Glen's mother, is in her early 40s. Nearly all of the characters appear to have some respect for her, and it is revealed that she has had an affair with Glen's boss Greg. She is critical of Glen's workmates.

Greg Baldoni, Glen's boss, is in his early 50s.

== Stagings ==
Face to Face first played at Ensemble Theatre in Sydney in March 1999. John McCallum of The Australian wrote "Face to Face is involving and funny in a seductively contrived way. You can laugh from a great height at its comicality or you can let yourself be drawn into its emotional narrative." Reviewing for The Sydney Morning Herald Bryce Hallett says "David Williamson's exploration of community conferencing, Face to Face, is a fascinating and, at times, engrossing work – a 90-minute documentary drama which puts store in a method of justice founded on conciliation, concern and emotional honesty", later saying "Although parts of Williamson's script is too didactic and contrived - it veers dangerously into soap opera when various sexual liaisons and deceits are unmasked, Face to Face is a raw, compassionate and timely play." The Daily Telegraph's Carrie Kablean finishes "Face to Face is powerful stuff, even though there's a whiff of fairytale ending." Andrew Stevenson, also of The Daily Telegraph, criticises the unrealistic nature of some parts of the play but also says "There's a wonderful unravelling story. We skate on the surface for quite some time before the cracks appear and we slowly enter the world beneath dreams and lies and posturing."

This was followed by a one off performance at a Sydney building site for construction workers in April before moving to the Footbridge Theatre.

In March 2000 Playbox Theatre Company staged it at the Malthouse in Melbourne and featured Guy Pearce in the role of the mediator. The Herald Sun’s Leonard Radic notes "The performances all carry the stamp of individuality. Guy Pearce neatly juggles the demands of moderator and occasional commentator, while Damien Richardson is impressive in his high-energy role as the touchy and temperamental employee given to sudden outbursts of workplace rage." Helen Thompson of The Age said "Face to Face reveals Williamson’s strengths as social observer and commentator. So close is this play to being a slice of life, that the writer's skill could be overlooked. In fact he has distilled a messier and lengthier real-life process into an hour-and-a-half, and meticulously plotted action, revelation and a series of emotional trajectories into a «satisfyingly well-made play." Steven Carroll in the Sunday Age gave it four stars saying "What follows is a rollercoaster ride through the amusement park of human frailty. And although it may seem mundane material, it is intrinsically dramatic and highly charged."

Also that month Sydney's Ensemble Theatre staged the play in Canberra and the Railway Street Theatre toured the play around New South Wales.

In 2001 the Perth Theatre Company put on the play at the Perth International Arts Festival and then toured it in regional Western Australia. The following year they presented the it at São Paulo's Cultura Inglesa Festival. Jan Hallam of the Sunday Times wrote of the Perth staging "Each player has a crucial role. From Bill McCluskey's bull-headed boss to Luke Hewitt's dimwitted and explosive Glen, and from Jenny Davis's long-suffering wife to Reg Cribb's no-bull construction worker, a complex picture of interlocking, interrelated issues is created."

== Film adaptation ==
The play was adapted into the film Face to Face (2011), directed by Michael Rymer.
