= Edmond Halley =

English astronomer, mathematician and physicist (1656–1742)

Edmond Halley FRS
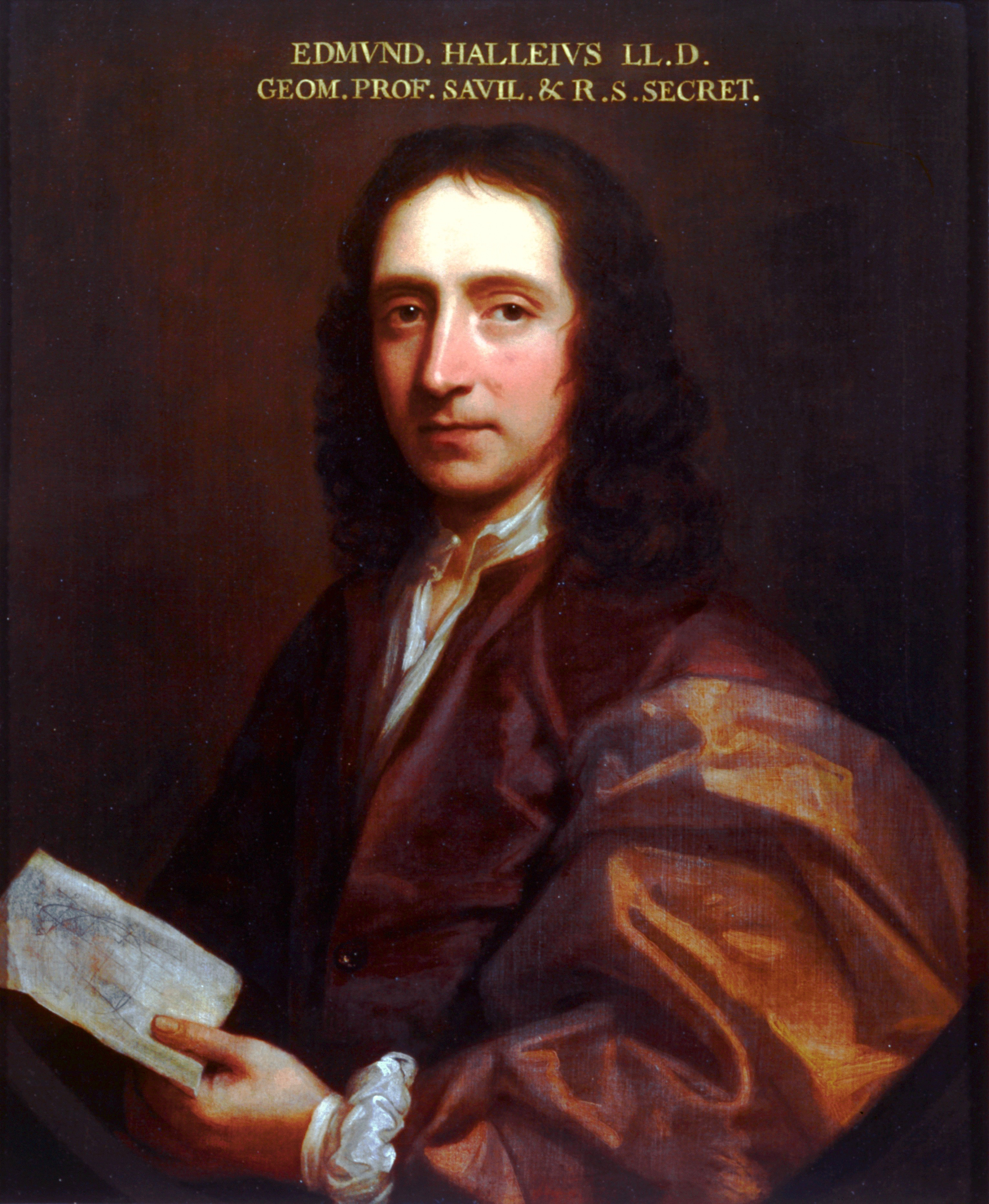
- Portrait by Thomas Murray, c. 1690
- Born: 8 November [O.S. 29 October] 1656; Haggerston, Middlesex, England
- Died: 25 January 1742 [O.S. 14 January 1741] (aged 85); Greenwich, Kent, Great Britain
- Resting place: St Margaret's, Lee
- Education: The Queen's College, Oxford
- Spouse: Mary Tooke (m. 1682)
- Children: 3
- Scientific career
- Fields: Astronomy, mathematics, physics, cartography
- Workplaces: University of Oxford; Royal Observatory, Greenwich

2nd Astronomer Royal
- In office 1720–1742
- Preceded by: John Flamsteed
- Succeeded by: James Bradley

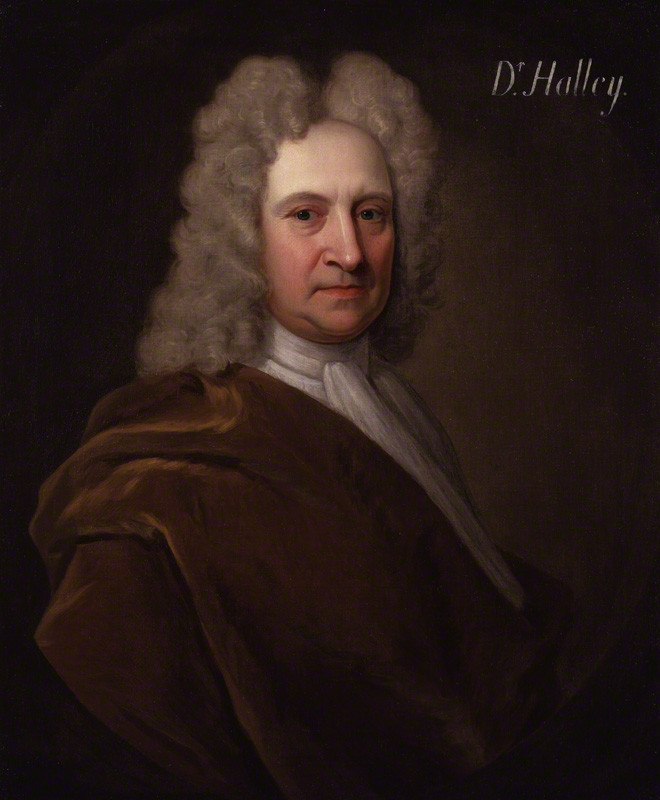
Portrait of Halley by Richard Phillips

Edmond (or Edmund) Halley FRS (/ˈhæli/; 8 November [O.S. 29 October] 1656 – 25 January 1742 [O.S. 14 January 1741]) was an English astronomer, mathematician and physicist. He was the second astronomer royal in Britain, succeeding John Flamsteed in 1720.

From an observatory he constructed on Saint Helena in 1676–77, Halley catalogued the southern celestial hemisphere and recorded a transit of Mercury across the Sun. He realised that a similar transit of Venus could be used to determine the distances between Earth, Venus, and the Sun. Upon his return to England, he was made a fellow of the Royal Society, and with the help of King Charles II, was granted a master's degree from Oxford.

Halley encouraged and helped fund the publication of Isaac Newton's influential Philosophiæ Naturalis Principia Mathematica (1687). From observations Halley made in September 1682, he used Newton's law of universal gravitation to compute the periodicity of Halley's Comet in his 1705 Synopsis of the Astronomy of Comets. (Note: This was perhaps the first astronomical mystery solved using Newton's laws by a scientist other than Newton.) It was named after him upon its predicted return in 1758, which he did not live to see.

Beginning in 1698, Halley made sailing expeditions and made observations on the conditions of terrestrial magnetism. In 1718, he discovered the proper motion of the "fixed stars".

== Early life ==
Halley was born in Haggerston in Middlesex. His father, Edmond Halley Sr., came from a Derbyshire family and was a wealthy soap-maker in London. Halley showed an early interest in mathematics. He studied at St Paul's School, where he developed an interest in astronomy and was elected captain of the school in 1671. The following year, his mother, Anne (probably née Robinson) died. In July 1673, Halley entered The Queen's College, Oxford. He took a twenty-four-foot (7.3 m) long telescope with him, apparently paid for by his father. While still an undergraduate, Halley published papers on the Solar System and sunspots. In March 1675, he wrote to John Flamsteed, the first Astronomer Royal, telling him that the leading published tables on the positions of Jupiter and Saturn were erroneous, as were some of Tycho Brahe's star positions. His association with Flamsteed soon led to Halley's first publication and to his expedition to Saint Helena.

== Career ==
=== Publications and inventions ===
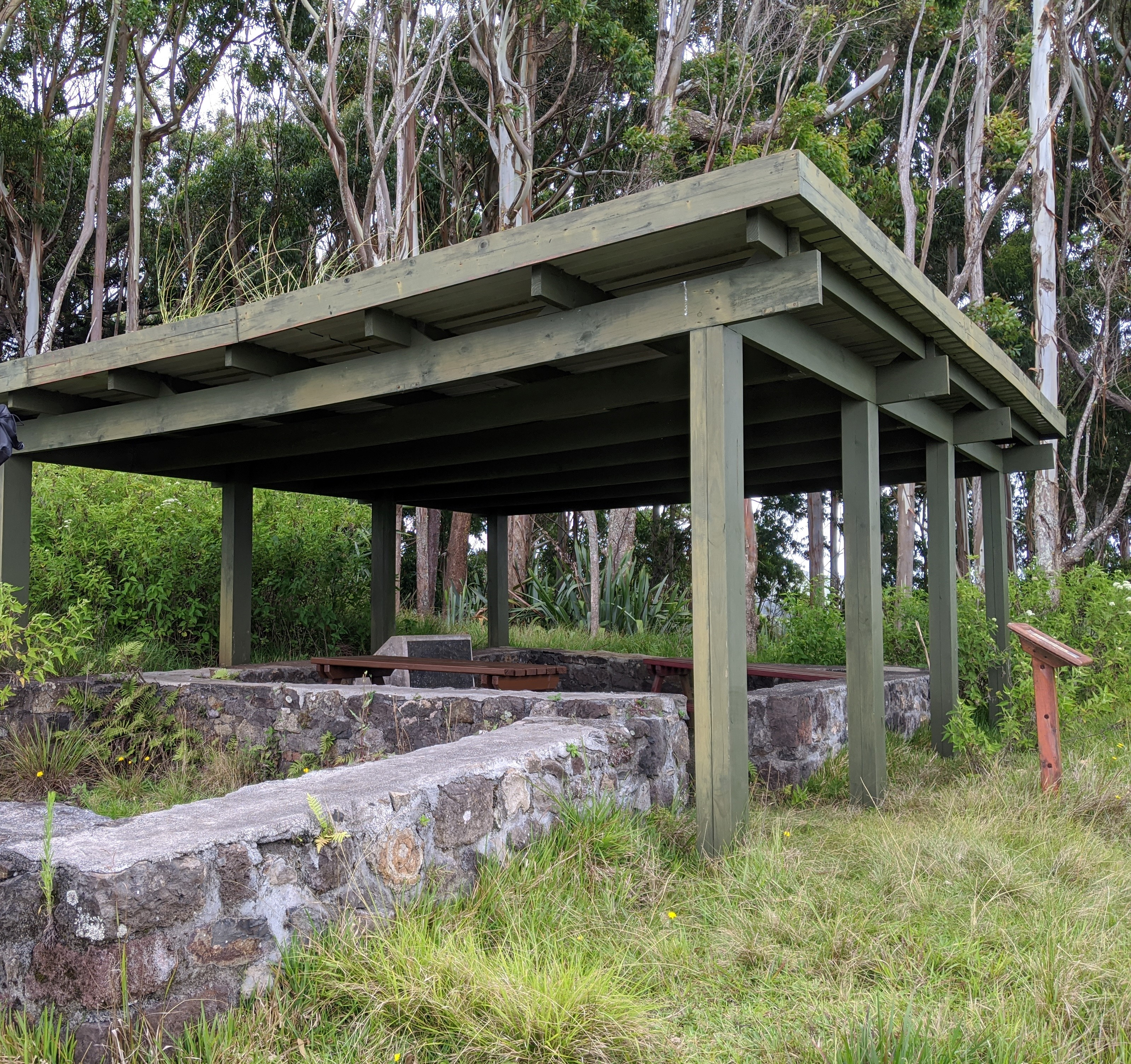
Site of Halley's Observatory on the island of Saint Helena in the South Atlantic Ocean

In 1676, Flamsteed helped Halley publish his first paper, titled "A Direct and Geometrical Method of Finding the Aphelia, Eccentricities, and Proportions of the Primary Planets, Without Supposing Equality in Angular Motion", on planetary orbits, in Philosophical Transactions of the Royal Society. Influenced by Flamsteed's project to compile a catalogue of stars of the northern celestial hemisphere, Halley proposed to do the same for the southern sky. He left Oxford to undertake the project, choosing the South Atlantic island of Saint Helena, from which he could observe southern stars as well as some northern stars for comparison. King Charles II supported the expedition.

Halley sailed to Saint Helena in late 1676 and established an observatory with a large sextant with telescopic sights. Over the following year, he made observations for what became the first telescopic catalogue of the southern sky, and observed a transit of Mercury across the Sun. Focusing the Mercury transit, Halley recognised that observations of planetary solar parallax, especially during a transit of Venus, could be used to determine trigonometrically the distances between Earth, Venus and the Sun. (Note: He wrote as late as 1716 in hopes of a future expedition to make these observations.)

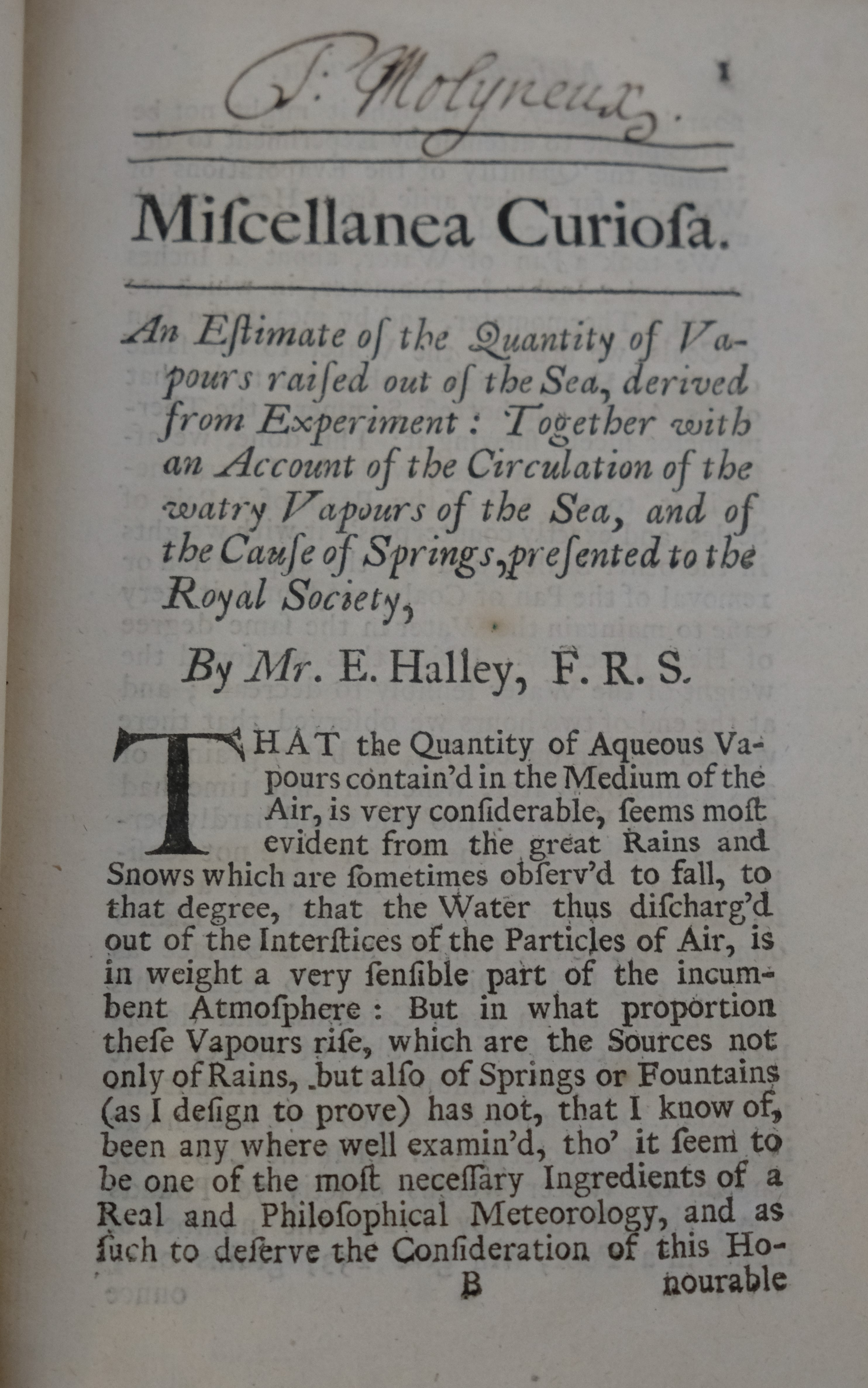
First page to volume I of Miscellanea curiosa published by the Royal Society (1705), in which Halley wrote "An estimate of the quantity of vapours raised out of the sea, derived from experiment"

Halley returned to England in May 1678, and used his data to produce a map of the southern stars. Oxford would not allow Halley to return because he had violated his residency requirements when he left for Saint Helena. He appealed to Charles II, who signed a letter requesting that Halley be unconditionally awarded his Master of Arts degree, which the college granted on 3 December 1678. Just a few days before, Halley had been elected as a fellow of the Royal Society, at the age of 22. In 1679, he published Catalogus Stellarum Australium ('A catalogue of the stars of the South'), which includes his map and descriptions of 341 stars. (Note: This contribution caused Flamsteed to nickname Halley "the southern Tycho". Tycho had catalogued the stars observed by Johannes Hevelius.) Robert Hooke presented the catalogue to the Royal Society. In mid-1679, Halley went to Danzig (Gdańsk) on behalf of the society to help resolve a dispute: because astronomer Johannes Hevelius' observing instruments were not equipped with telescopic sights, Flamsteed and Hooke had questioned the accuracy of his observations; Halley stayed with Hevelius and checked his observations, finding that they were quite precise.

By 1681, Giovanni Domenico Cassini had told Halley of his theory that comets were objects in orbit. In September 1682, Halley carried out a series of observations of what became known as Halley's Comet; his name became associated with it because of his work on its orbit and predicting its return in 1758 (which he did not live to see). In early 1686, Halley was elected to the Royal Society's new position of secretary, requiring him to give up his fellowship and manage correspondence and meetings, as well as edit the Philosophical Transactions. (Note: For his payment, he was given 75 unsold copies of the society's unsuccessful book The History of Fish, which it had depleted its funds on.) Also in 1686, Halley published the second part of the results from his Helenian expedition, being a paper and chart on trade winds and monsoons. The symbols he used to represent trailing winds still exist in most modern day weather chart representations. In this article he identified solar heating as the cause of atmospheric motions. He also established the relationship between barometric pressure and height above sea level. His charts were an important contribution to the emerging field of information visualisation.

Halley spent most of his time on lunar observations, but was also interested in the problems of gravity. One problem that attracted his attention was the proof of Kepler's laws of planetary motion. In August 1684, he went to Cambridge to discuss this with Isaac Newton, much as John Flamsteed had done four years earlier, only to find that Newton had solved the problem, at the instigation of Flamsteed with regard to the orbit of Kirch's Comet, without publishing the solution. Halley asked to see the calculations and was told by Newton that he could not find them, but promised to redo them and send them on later, which he eventually did, in a short treatise titled On the motion of bodies in an orbit. Halley recognised the importance of the work and returned to Cambridge to arrange its publication with Newton, who instead went on to expand it into his Philosophiæ Naturalis Principia Mathematica published at Halley's expense in 1687. Halley's first calculations with comets were thereby for the orbit of Kirch's Comet, based on Flamsteed's observations in 1680–1681. (Note: Halley asked Newton to obtain Flamsteed's observations for him, as his own relationship with the older astronomer had deteriorated.) Although he was to accurately calculate the orbit of the comet of 1682, he was inaccurate in his calculations of the orbit of Kirch's Comet. They indicated a periodicity of 575 years, thus appearing in the years 531 and 1106, and presumably heralding the death of Julius Caesar in a like fashion in 45 BC. It is now known to have an orbital period of circa 10,000 years.

In 1691, Halley built a diving bell, a device in which the atmosphere was replenished by way of weighted barrels of air sent down from the surface. In a demonstration, Halley and five companions dived to 60 feet (18 m) in the River Thames, and remained there for over an hour and a half. Halley's bell was of little use for practical salvage work, as it was very heavy, but he made improvements to it over time, later extending his underwater exposure time to over 4 hours. Halley suffered one of the earliest recorded cases of middle ear barotrauma. That same year, at a meeting of the Royal Society, Halley introduced a rudimentary working model of a magnetic compass using a liquid-filled housing to damp the swing and wobble of the magnetised needle.

In 1691, Halley sought the post of Savilian Professor of Astronomy at Oxford. While a candidate for the position, Halley faced the animosity of the Astronomer Royal, John Flamsteed, and the Anglican Church questioned his religious views, (Note: "To what extent Halley's failure was due the animosity of John Flamsteed or to his stout defence [sic] of his religious belief that not every iota of scripture was necessarily divinely inspired is still a matter of some argument. All Oxford appointees had to assent to the Articles of Religion and be approved by the Church of England. Halley's religious views could not have been too outlandish because the University was happy to grant him another chair 12 years later. ... Halley held liberal religious views and was very outspoken. He believed in having a reverent but questioning attitude towards the eternal problems and had little sympathy for those who unquestioningly accepted dogma. He was certainly not an atheist." Hughes 1985, pp. 198, 201.) largely on the grounds that he had doubted the Earth's age as given in the Bible. (Note: Halley had noticed that observable geological processes take much longer than implied by the Genesis flood narrative. In attempt to explain the biblical account, Halley had theorized that the gravity of a passing comet could have suddenly raised the oceans in a certain area. Following his failure to obtain the professorship, he investigated ocean salinity as an indicator of the Earth's age, since salt is carried to the ocean by rivers. He estimated the Earth to be over 100 million years old.) After Flamsteed wrote to Newton to rally support against Halley, Newton wrote back in hopes of reconciliation, but was unsuccessful. Halley's candidacy was opposed by both the archbishop of Canterbury, John Tillotson, and Bishop Stillingfleet, and the post went instead to David Gregory, who had Newton's support.

In 1692, Halley put forth the idea of a hollow Earth consisting of a shell about 500 miles (800 km) thick, two inner concentric shells and an innermost core. He suggested that atmospheres separated these shells, and that each shell had its own magnetic poles, with each sphere rotating at a different speed. Halley proposed this scheme to explain anomalous compass readings. He envisaged each inner region as having an atmosphere and being luminous (and possibly inhabited), and speculated that escaping gas caused the aurora borealis. He suggested, "Auroral rays are due to particles, which are affected by the magnetic field, the rays parallel to Earth's magnetic field."

In 1693 Halley published an article on life annuities, which featured an analysis of age-at-death on the basis of the Breslau statistics Caspar Neumann had been able to provide. This article allowed the British government to sell life annuities at an appropriate price based on the age of the purchaser. Halley's work strongly influenced the development of actuarial science. The construction of the life-table for Breslau, which followed more primitive work by John Graunt, is now seen as a major event in the history of demography.

In 1694, Halley presented a paper to the Royal Society on the cause of the biblical Flood, in which he suggested a physical explanation involving the close approach of a comet to the Earth. (Note: Halley argued that marine remains found far from and above the sea showed that such places had once been underwater or raised from the sea. He proposed that a cometary close approach or "choc" could alter the Earth's axis or rotation, agitate the oceans, displace the seabed, heap earth into mountains, and help explain remains of earlier animal life found in the Earth.) In a follow-up paper delivered on 19 December, he wrote that he had been advised to understand the hypothesis as applying to changes before the Creation rather than to the biblical Deluge. The papers were not published until 1724, with an accompanying note explaining that Halley had feared censure from the "Sacred Order". Although not now accepted, this was an early scientific explanation for a biblical event, and these views did not commend him to some powerful ecclesiastics of his day.

In 1696, Newton was appointed as warden of the Royal Mint and nominated Halley as deputy comptroller of the Chester mint. Halley spent two years supervising coin production. While there, he caught two clerks pilfering precious metals. He and the local warden spoke out about the scheme, unaware that the local master of the mint was profiting from it.

In 1698, the Czar of Russia (later known as Peter the Great) was on a visit to England, and hoped Newton would be available to entertain him. Newton sent Halley in his place. He and the Czar bonded over science and brandy. According to one disputed account, when both of them were drunk one night, Halley jovially pushed the Czar around Deptford in a wheelbarrow.

=== Exploration years ===
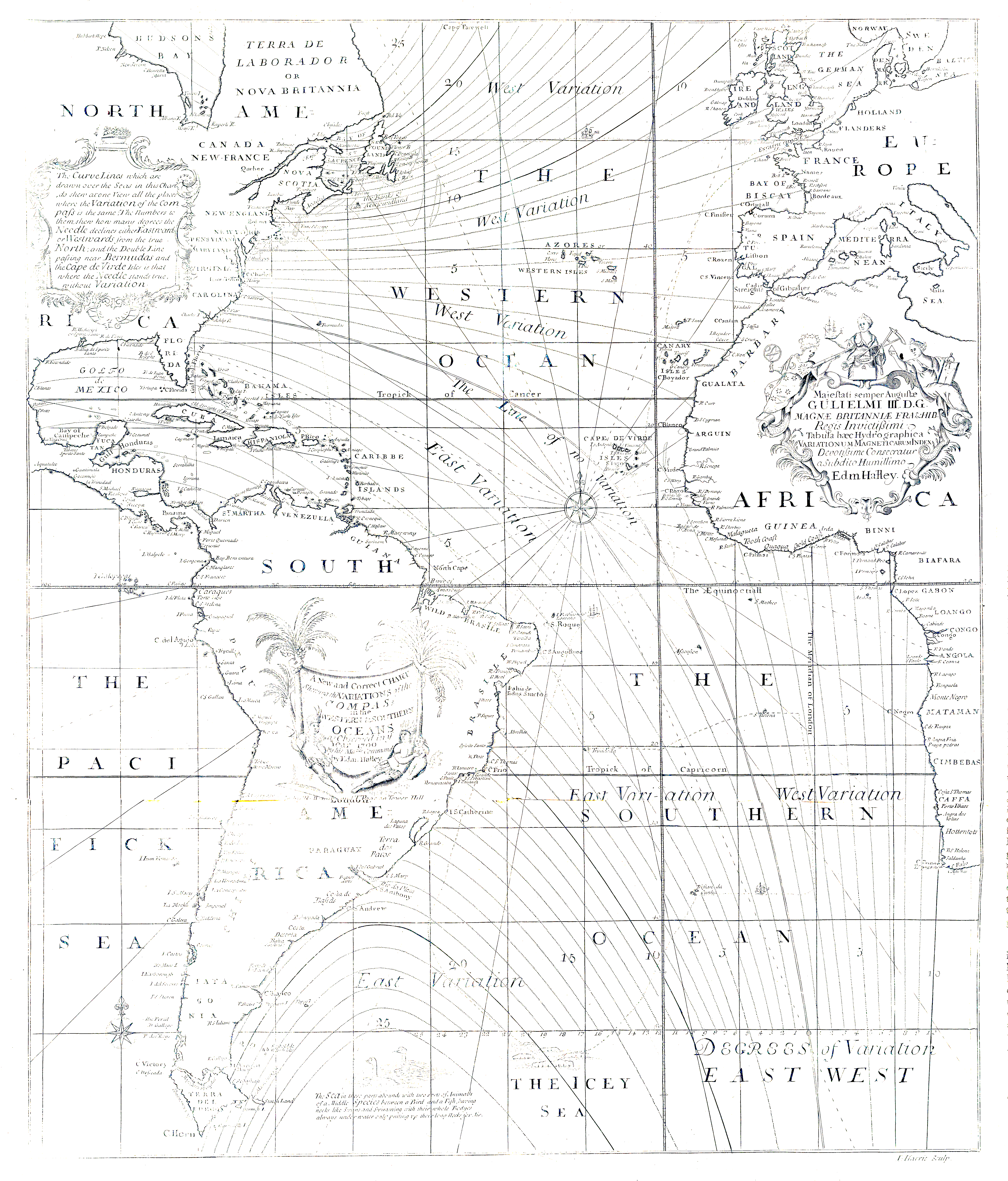
Halley's 1701 map showing isogonic lines of equal magnetic declination in the Atlantic Ocean.

In 1698, at the behest of King William III, Halley was given command of the Paramour, a 52 feet (16 m) pink, so that he could carry out investigations in the South Atlantic into the laws governing the variation of the compass, as well as to refine the coordinates of the English colonies in the Americas. On 19 August 1698, he took command of the ship and, in November 1698, sailed on what was the first purely scientific voyage by an English naval vessel. Unfortunately problems of insubordination arose over questions of Halley's competence to command a vessel. Halley returned the ship to England to proceed against officers in July 1699. The result was a mild rebuke for his men, and dissatisfaction for Halley, who felt the court had been too lenient. Halley thereafter received a temporary commission as a captain in the Royal Navy, recommissioned the Paramour on 24 August 1699 and sailed again in September 1699 to make extensive observations on the conditions of terrestrial magnetism. This task he accomplished in a second Atlantic voyage which lasted until 6 September 1700, and extended from 52 degrees north to 52 degrees south. The results were published in General Chart of the Variation of the Compass (1701). This was the first such chart to be published and the first on which isogonic, or Halleyan, lines appeared. The use of such lines inspired later ideas such as those of isotherms by Alexander von Humboldt in his maps. In 1701, Halley made a third and final voyage on the Paramour to study the tides of the English Channel. In 1702, he was dispatched by Queen Anne on diplomatic missions to other European leaders.

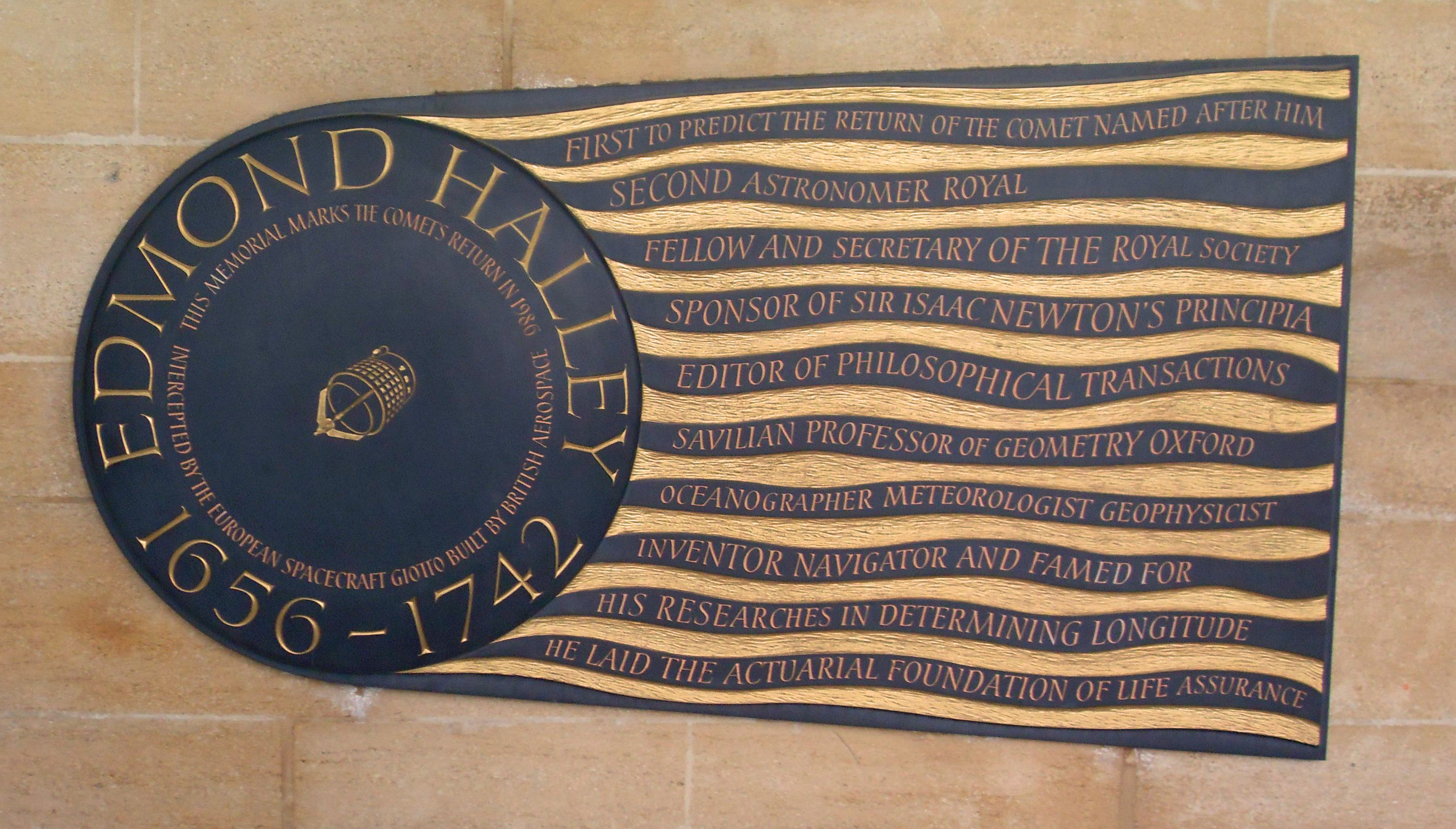
Comet-like plaque to Halley in the South Cloister of Westminster Abbey

The preface to Awnsham and John Churchill's collection of voyages and travels (1704), supposedly written by John Locke or by Halley, valourised expeditions such as these as part of a grand expansion of European knowledge of the world:

What was cosmography before these discoveries, but an imperfect fragment of a science, scarce deserving so good a name? When all the known world was only Europe, a small part of Africk, and the lesser portion of Asia; so that of this terraqueous globe not one sixth part had ever been seen or heard of. Nay so great was the ignorance of man in this particular, that learned persons made a doubt of its being round; others no less knowing imagin'd all they were not acquainted with, desart and uninhabitable. But now geography and hydrography have receiv'd some perfection by the pains of so many mariners and travelers, who to evince the rotundity of the earth and water, have sail'd and travell'd round it, as has been here made appear; to show there is no part uninhabitable, unless the frozen polar regions, have visited all other countries, tho never so remote, which they have found well peopl'd, and most of them rich and delightful…. Astronomy has receiv'd the addition of many constellations never seen before. Natural and moral history is embelish'd with the most beneficial increase of so many thousands of plants it had never before receiv'd, so many drugs and spices, such variety of beasts, birds and fishes, such rarities in minerals, mountains and waters, such unaccountable diversity of climates and men, and in them of complexions, tempers, habits, manners, politicks, and religions…. To conclude, the empire of Europe is now extended to the utmost bounds of the earth, where several of its nations have conquests and colonies. These and many more are the advantages drawn from the labours of those, who expose themselves to the dangers of the vast ocean, and of unknown nations; which those who sit still at home abundantly reap in every kind: and the relation of one traveler is an incentive to stir up another to imitate him, whilst the rest of mankind, in their accounts without stirring a foot, compass the earth and seas, visit all countries, and converse with all nations.

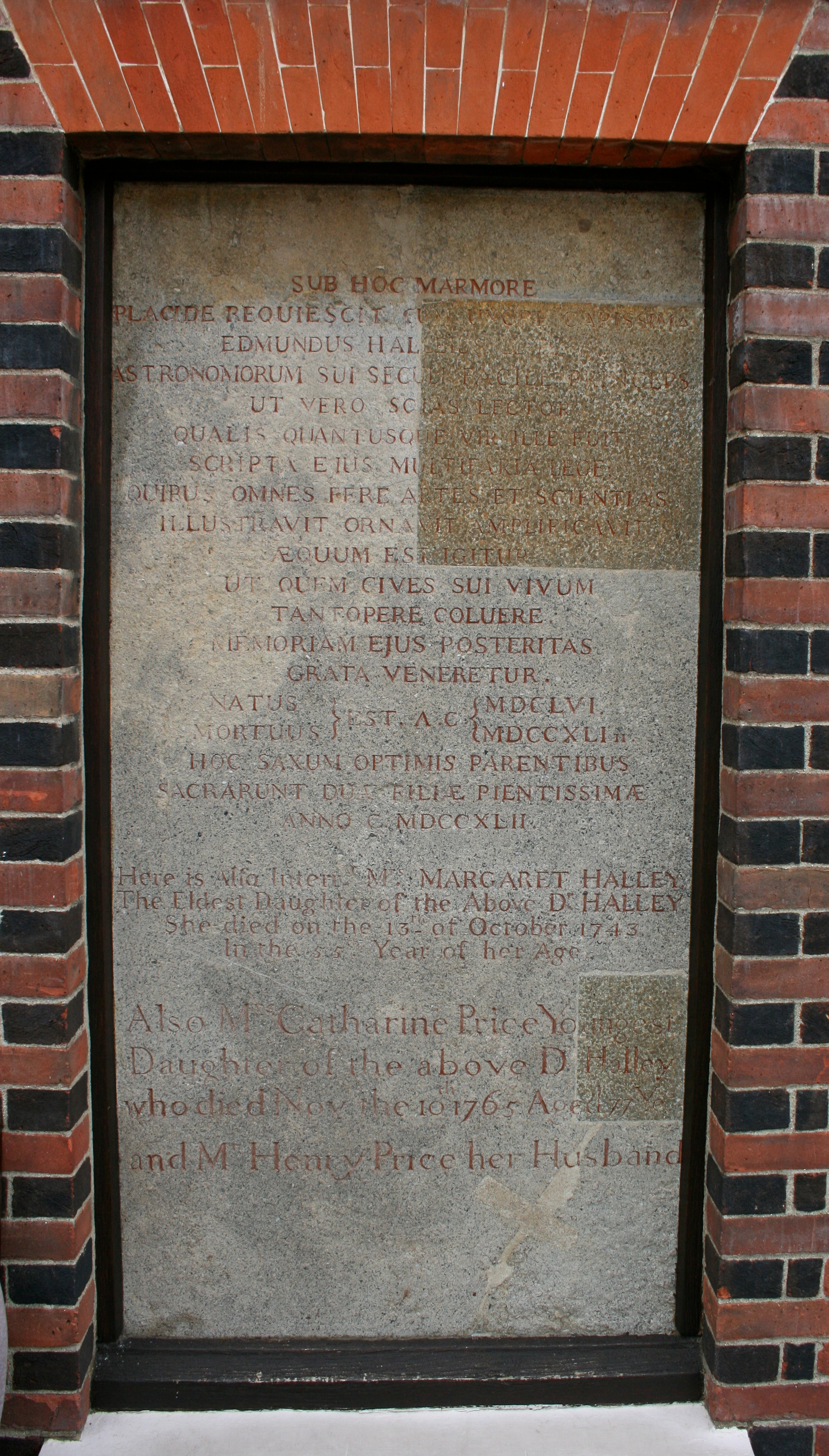
Edmond Halley's tombstone, re-positioned at the Royal Observatory, Greenwich; he is not buried there, but at St Margaret's, Lee, some 30 minutes' walk away to the south

=== Life as an academic ===
In November 1703, Halley was appointed Savilian Professor of Geometry at the University of Oxford, his theological enemies, John Tillotson and Bishop Stillingfleet having died. In 1705, applying historical astronomy methods, he published the paper Astronomiae cometicae synopsis (A Synopsis of the Astronomy of Comets); in this, he stated his belief that the comet sightings of 1456, 1531, 1607, and 1682 were of the same comet, and that it would return in 1758. Halley did not live to witness the comet's return, but when it did, the comet became generally known as Halley's Comet.

By 1706 Halley had learned Arabic and completed the translation started by Edward Bernard of Books V–VII of Apollonius's Conics from copies found at Leiden and the Bodleian Library at Oxford. He also completed a new translation of the first four books from the original Greek that had been started by the late David Gregory. He published these along with his own reconstruction of Book VIII in the first complete Latin edition in 1710. The same year, he received an honorary degree of doctor of laws from Oxford.

In 1716, Halley suggested a high-precision measurement of the distance between the Earth and the Sun by timing the transit of Venus. In doing so, he was following the method described by James Gregory in Optica Promota (in which the design of the Gregorian telescope is also described). It is reasonable to assume Halley possessed and had read this book given that the Gregorian design was the principal telescope design used in astronomy in Halley's day. It is not to Halley's credit that he failed to acknowledge Gregory's priority in this matter. In 1717–18 he discovered the proper motion of the "fixed" stars (publishing this in 1718) by comparing his astrometric measurements with those given in Ptolemy's Almagest. Arcturus and Sirius were two noted to have moved significantly, the latter having progressed 30 arc minutes (about the diameter of the moon) southwards in 1800 years.

In 1720, together with his friend the antiquarian William Stukeley, Halley participated in the first attempt to scientifically date Stonehenge. Assuming that the monument had been laid out using a magnetic compass, Stukeley and Halley attempted to calculate the perceived deviation introducing corrections from existing magnetic records, and suggested three dates (460 BC, AD 220 and AD 920), the earliest being the one accepted. These dates were wrong by thousands of years, but the idea that scientific methods could be used to date ancient monuments was revolutionary in its day.

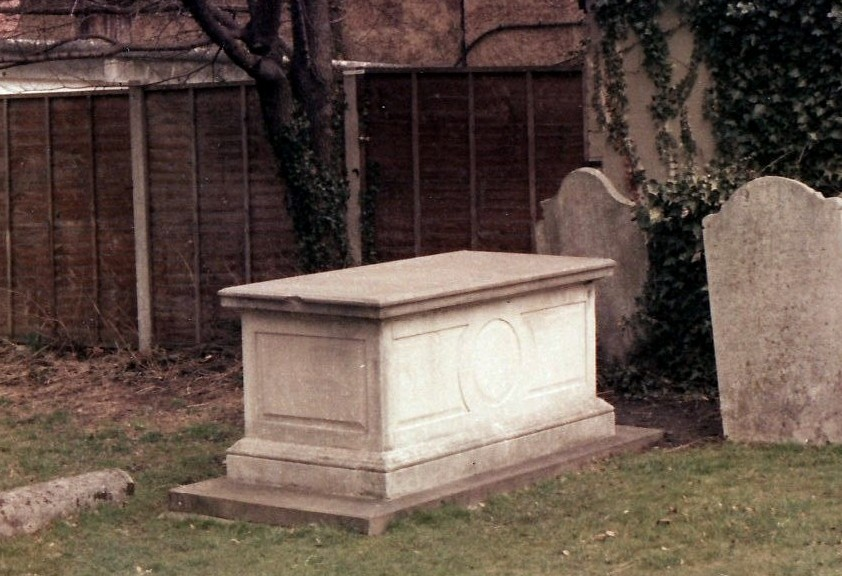
Halley's grave

Halley succeeded John Flamsteed in 1720 as Astronomer Royal, a position Halley held until his death in 1742 at the age of 85. He was buried in the graveyard of the old church of St Margaret's, Lee (since rebuilt), at Lee Terrace, Blackheath. He was interred in the same vault as the Astronomer Royal John Pond; the unmarked grave of the Astronomer Royal Nathaniel Bliss is nearby. His original tombstone was transferred by the Admiralty when the original Lee church was demolished and rebuilt – it can be seen today on the southern wall of the Camera Obscura at the Royal Observatory, Greenwich. His marked grave can be seen at St Margaret's Church, Lee Terrace.

Despite the persistent misconception that Halley received a knighthood, it is not the case. The idea can be tracked back to American astronomical texts such as William Augustus Norton's 1839 An Elementary Treatise on Astronomy, possibly due to Halley's royal occupations and connections to Sir Isaac Newton.

== Personal life ==
Halley married Mary Tooke in 1682 and settled in Islington. The couple had three children.

== Named after Edmond Halley ==
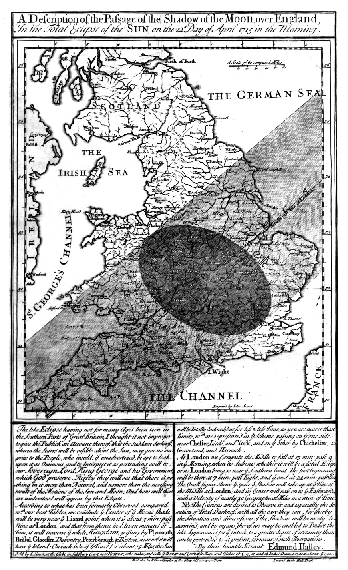
Halley's map of the path of the Solar eclipse of 3 May 1715 across England

- Halley's Comet (orbital period (approximately) 75 years)
- Halley (lunar crater)
- Halley (Martian crater)
- Halley Research Station, Antarctica
- Halley's method, for the numerical solution of equations
- Halley Street, in Blackburn, Victoria, Australia
- Edmund Halley Road, Oxford Science Park, Oxford, OX4 4DQ UK
- Edmund Halley Drive, Reston, Virginia, United States
- Edmund Halley Way, Greenwich Peninsula, London
- Halley's Mount, Saint Helena (680m high)
- Halley Drive, Hackensack, New Jersey, intersects with Comet Way on the campus of Hackensack High School, home of the Comets
- Rue Edmund Halley, Avignon, France
- The Halley Academy, a school in London, England
- Halley House School, Hackney London (2015)
- Halley Gardens, Blackheath, London.

== Pronunciation and spelling ==
There are three pronunciations of the surname Halley. These are /ˈhæli/, /ˈheɪli/, and /ˈhɔːli/. As a personal surname, the most common pronunciation in the 21st century, both in Great Britain and in the United States, is /ˈhæli/ (rhymes with "valley"). This is the personal pronunciation used by most Halleys living in London today. The alternative /ˈheɪli/ is much more common when referring to the comet than it is when used as a modern surname. Colin Ronan, one of Halley's biographers, preferred /ˈhɔːli/. Contemporary accounts spell his name Hailey, Hayley, Haley, Haly, Halley, Hawley and Hawly, and presumably pronunciations varied similarly.

As for his given name, although the spelling "Edmund" is quite common, "Edmond" is what Halley himself used, according to a 1902 article, though a 2007 International Comet Quarterly article disputes this, commenting that in his published works, he used "Edmund" 22 times and "Edmond" only 3 times, with several other variations used as well, such as the Latinised "Edmundus". Much of the debate stems from the fact that, in Halley's own time, English spelling conventions were not yet standardised, and so he himself used multiple spellings.

== In popular media ==
- Halley is voiced by Cary Elwes in the 2014 documentary series Cosmos: A Spacetime Odyssey.
- A fictional version of Halley appears in The Magnus Archives, a horror podcast, where he tried to extinguish the sun.
- Fritz Weaver portrayed a fictional version of Halley in Comet Watch, a second-season episode of the anthology series Tales from the Darkside.
- Actor John Wood was cast as Edmond Halley in the TV series, Longitude in 2000.
- Halley is a major figure in David Williamson's play Nearer the Gods, about Sir Isaac Newton
- The pronunciation /ˈheɪli/ was used by rock and roll singer Bill Haley, who called his backing band his "Comets" after the common pronunciation of Halley's Comet in the United States at the time.
- Halley is one of the side characters in novels Taivaanpallo (The Celestial Sphere, Otava 2018) and Merenpeitto (The Art of Living under Water, Otava 2019) by the Finnish writer Olli Jalonen.

== See also ==
- History of geomagnetism
