= Perth Theatre Company =

Former theatre company in Perth, Western Australia

Perth Theatre Company was a live theatre company in Perth, Western Australia.

== History ==
Perth Theatre Company was founded as SWY Theatre Company by graduates from the specialist Theatre Arts course at John Curtin Senior High School in 1983. Between 1983 and 1986, SWY operated out of a disused warehouse in Fremantle before moving to 65 Murray Street, Perth in 1987. In 1994 the Company adopted the name of Perth Theatre Company and found a new home at the Playhouse Theatre. In 1996, Perth Theatre Company became a company limited by guarantee.

In 2008, Perth Theatre Company's only Artistic Director, Alan Becher died and Melissa Cantwell was appointed the company's new Artistic Director.

In 2016 Perth Theatre Company ceased operations.

== Production history ==
As SWY Theatre Company

- 1983: Or Else, Locked In, Going Home, Self Service and Roll Call.
- 1984: Waterfront
- 1985: Children of War, Greek.
- 1986: Fast Forward, Stars, The Flash Stockman, Wham, Are You Lonesome Tonight?, Boomeroo! (Festival of Perth).
- 1987: Zen and Now, Cheapside, Such is Life (Festival of Perth), No Room for Dreamers.
- 1988: Europe, Mummy loves you Betty Ann Jewel, Zen and Now.
- 1989: Teechers, It's a Girl, Separation.
- 1990: Teechers, Under Milk Wood, Crystal Clear, Living in the 70s.
- 1991: Low, Beach Blanket Tempest, A Night in the Arms of Raeleen, Portrait of the Artist as a Young Man, Stories from Suburban Road.
- 1992: Wild Cat Falling, Stories from Suburban Road (remount for northwest WA regional tour).
- 1993: Five Fingers, Hedda Gabler, Cargo, The Newspaper of Claremont Street.

As Perth Theatre Company

- 1994: Oleanna, Whispering Demons, The Heidi Chronicles, Brilliant Lies.
- 1995: Dead Funny, Double Act, Lockie Leonard, Human Torpedo.
- 1996: Lockie Leonard Human Torpedo, Communicating Doors, Double Act, The Shoe-Horn Sonata.
- 1997: Siren, Same time another year, Dead Funny, A Passionate woman.
- 1998: Silly Cow, Milk and Honey, Sweet Phoebe, Decadence.
- 1999: Third World Blues, Weekend Breaks, Social Climbers, The Censor, Speaking in Tongues.
- 2000: The Exploding Breakfast, Gasping, Miss Julie, The Mule's Foal, Stories from Suburban Road.
- 2001: The Getaway Bus, Face to Face, Shopping and F***ing, Vagina Monologues.
- 2002: The Return, Stories from Suburban Road, Cox Four, Face to Face, The Vagina Monologues.
- 2003: The Corporal's Wife, Skin Tight, Shadow of the Eagles, Covert.
- 2004: Bench, Talk about passion, Face to Face, The Chatroom.
- 2005: Tango, Soulmates, Skin Tight, Welcome to Dullsville!.
- 2006: Charitable Intent, Amadeus, Marmalade and Egg, Soulmates (re-mount).
- 2007: Bombshells, The Goat or who is Sylvia?, St Nicholas, Baby Boomer Blues.
- 2008: The Turning, Glorious!, Baby Boomer Blues (tour), Speed-The-Plow, Taking Liberty, The Haunting of Daniel Gartrell.
- 2009: The Matchmaker, The Big Picture, Rose, The Seed, Equus, An Oak Tree.
- 2010: The Adventures of Alvin Sputnik: Deep Sea Explorer, The Removalists.
- 2011: The Ugly One, The Pride, Tender Napalm.
- 2012: It's Dark Outside, On The Misconceptions of Oedipus, Blackbird.
- 2013: Alienation, A Number.
- 2014: 6 Gigabytes of Hardcore Pornography, Wish, White Rabbit Red Rabbit.
- 2015: From the Rubble, The Song was Wrong.
