= King Lear (Williamson play) =

Play written by David Williamson

King Lear is a 1978 Australian play by David Williamson. It is an adaptation of King Lear by William Shakespeare.

The play is commonly regarded as among Williamson's less successful plays and is rarely revived.

== Background ==
The play came out of a discussion between David Williamson and director Peter Oyston in 1977 about how to make Shakespeare more accessible. Williamson agreed do an adaptation of King Lear. The object was to put the play into contemporary, accessible English without changing the structure or philosophy. It was to be performed for a nine-week season at the Alexander Theatre, Monash University. Oyston received a grant of $20,000 to help him with the production. Williamson completed his draft while lecturing in Denmark. The original cast had Reg Evans as Lear and Joe Bolza as the Fool.

== Reception ==
Len Radic of The Age said the production "must be given points for enterprise and daring" but said it and the adaptation were "dull".
