= At Any Cost =

At Any Cost may refer to:

- "At Any Cost", a 1996 single by the Swedish punk band Randy
- At Any Cost (film), a 2000 American drama film directed by Charles Winkler
  - At Any Cost - Music from the VH1 Original Movie, a soundtrack album co-produced by Andrew Rollins and Steve Plunkett
- At Any Cost?, a 2011 play by the Australian playwright David Williamson
- At Any Cost: Metz 1870, a 2018 board game published by GMT Games
- At Any Cost, a 2020 album by the American Christian reggae band Christafari
