= The Puzzle (play) =

2024 play by David Williamson

- Original language: English
- Written by: David Williamson
- Subject: polyamory
- Genre: comedy

Premiere
- Date: 20 September 2024
- Place: Dunstan Playhouse, Adelaide
- Directed by: Shannon Rush

The Puzzle is a 2024 Australian play by David Williamson. It will have its world premiere in Adelaide in 2024 with the State Theatre Company South Australia.

Williamson called it a comedy about how lives are continually disrupted, “and how infidelity and boredom can become the basis of human comedy and tragedy”.

"So many people screw their lives up in the most ludicrous way, and as a satirist I'm attracted to that," said Williamson. "People who have everything but convince themselves they need more."

== Premise ==
A father takes his daughter on a cruise that turns out to be for swingers.
