= Cruise Control =

Cruise control is a system that automatically controls the speed of a motor vehicle.

- Adaptive cruise control, a more advanced version, which automatically adjusts the vehicle speed to maintain a safe distance from vehicles ahead.

Cruise Control may also refer to:

== Songs ==
- "Cruise Control" (Headless Chickens song)
- "Cruise Control", a song by the Dixie Dregs from the 1977 album Free Fall
- "Cruise Control", a song by Joey Badass from the 2022 album 2000
- "Cruise Control", a song by Kylie Minogue from the 2003 album Body Language
- "Cruise Control", a song by Mariah Carey from the 2008 album E=MC²
- "Cruise Control", a song by Onefour
- "Cruise Control", a song by Tower of Power from the 1993 album T.O.P.
- Speed 2: Cruise Control, a 1997 film
  - Speed 2: Cruise Control (soundtrack)

== Other uses ==
- CruiseControl, software build framework
- Cruise Control (play), a 2014 play by David Williamson

== See also ==
- Autothrottle
