= The Big Time (play) =

2019 play by David Williamson

- Original language: English
- Written by: David Williamson
- Genre: comedy

Premiere
- Date: January 2019
- Place: Ensemble Theatre, Sydney

The Big Time is a 2019 Australian comedy play by David Williamson. It premiered at the Ensemble Theatre in Sydney from January to March 2019.

== Plot ==
Two female actors who attended drama school together at NIDA have different career paths. Celia is a high profile soap star earning large amounts of money and enjoying a celebrity lifestyle. Vicki is working in independent theatre. When Vicki proposes they collaborate on an ambitious new film project, it could be a big opportunity for both.

== Original cast ==
- Claudia Barrie
- Zoe Carides
- Aileen Huynh
- Matt Minto
- Jeremy Waters
- Ben Wood

== Production ==
Williamson was inspired to write the play by the lengths people go to succeed in show business. "It’s apparent the only place to be if you’re in this profession is the big time, at the top," he says. "Otherwise your life is miserable."

He was particularly inspired by the careers of his sons Felix and Rory, who were both actors but gave it up. "It’s the feeling of worthlessness, depression," he said. "When you’re judged all the time and found wanting, you have to feel like a lesser human being, you have to feel shrivelled inside.... Nothing in this play is something I haven’t seen happen before my eyes. You’re offered the big chance of a life time, but it involves betraying someone close to you. A lot of people will go that way."

Williamson said the issues were not limited to show business. "It’s a highly competitive arena that puts enormous psychological pressure on a lot of people," he admits, adding that "it’s a reflection on the way our general society is going, where nobody has real job security anymore... Since Thatcher and Reagan decided neoliberalism was the way to go, the world has become a nastier, more competitive, more ruthless place. There’s no perfect society, but I don't think it needs to be as brutal as it is now."
