= Nearer the Gods =

Play by David Williamson

- Original language: English
- Written by: David Williamson
- Genre: comedy

Premiere
- Date: October 2018
- Place: Brisbane, Australia

Nearer the Gods is a 2018 Australian comedy play by David Williamson about Isaac Newton.

In October 2018 the play opened the newly refurbished Bille Brown Theatre for the Queensland Theatre Company.

Williamson said he was inspired to write the play after reading about Newton's relationship with Edmund Halley, wife Mary and Robert Hooke. The playwright said the play "is about brilliance and bastardry. The toxic disconnect between our highest and basest potentials. The better angels of our nature always in danger of being ripped down by the crocodile lurking in our brainstem."

== Plot ==
Sir Isaac Newton battles with the Royal Society to prove his universal theory of gravity.
