= The Great Man (play) =

Play by David Williamson

- Original language: English
- Written by: David Williamson

Premiere
- Date: 2000

The Great Man is a 2000 Australian play by David Williamson about the death of a prominent Labor Party politician and its impact on people close to him.
