= Face to Face (2011 film) =

- Directed by: Michael Rymer
- Screenplay by: Michael Rymer
- Based on: Face to Face, a play by David Williamson
- Produced by: Leanne Hanley; Gabrielle Christopher; Michael Rymer; David Williamson
- Starring: Vince Colosimo; Sigrid Thornton; Luke Ford; Matthew Newton; Robert Rabiah
- Cinematography: Dennys Ilic
- Edited by: Sasha Dylan Bell
- Music by: Richard Gibbs
- Distributed by: Australian Film Syndicate; Umbrella Entertainment
- Release date: 8 September 2011
- Running time: 89 minutes
- Country: Australia
- Language: English

Face to Face (2011) is an independent Australian film directed by Michael Rymer, based on the play of the same name, written by Australian playwright David Williamson. The film stars Vince Colosimo, Sigrid Thornton, Luke Ford and Matthew Newton.

== Plot ==
A young construction worker rams into the back of his boss's Jaguar in a fit of anger at being sacked. Rather than fronting court, he is given the chance to explain his actions in a community conference. This face-to-face confrontation between the young man, his boss, his boss's wife, his co-workers, his best mate and his mother lifts the lid not only on his dysfunctional life but on their workplace dirty laundry, turning all of their lives upside down.

== Cast ==
- Vincent Colosimo as Greg Baldoni
- Luke Ford as Wayne Travers
- Matthew Newton as Jack Manning
- Sigrid Thornton as Claire Baldoni
- Lauren Clair as Maureen Travers
- Christopher Connelly as Richard Halligan
- Laura Gordon as Julie Rossiter
- Robert Rabiah as Hakim Slimon
- Ra Chapman as Theresa Martin
- Josh Saks as Barry McLean
- Dom Phelan as Mac
- Glenn Maynard as Nookie
- Calen Mackenzie as young Wayne
- Richard Sutherland as Stan Travers
- James Romeril as Adrian Baldoni
- Alicia Attwood as Pub Waitress

== Reception ==
Face to Face is the first commercially released feature film to be shot on Canon HDSLR digital still cameras by photographer/cinematographer Dennys Ilic. From February 2011 to September 2011 Face to Face has won 40 international Film festival awards including the Michael Moore Traverse City Film Festival.The movie also won the award of Best Dramatic feature at the 2012 Byron Bay International Film Festival.

Of Face to Face, filmmaker Michael Moore (Fahrenheit 9/11, Bowling for Columbine), said, "This is one of those rare films which grabs hold of you at the beginning and doesn't let go till the end. It is an amazing piece of cinema - riveting, thought-provoking, transformative. Only once or twice a year do I see such a film - and this year that film is Face to Face. Not only should every person in Michigan see this film - but every person in America should see this film."

== Accolades ==
Year	Award	Nomination	Nominee	Result
2011	AACTA Awards	Best Actor in a Supporting Role	Robert Rabiah	Nominated
2011	Inside Film Awards	Best Feature Film	Director: Michael Rymer. Producer: Gabrielle Christopher, Leanne Hanley, Michael Rymer & David Williamson	Nominated
2011	Inside Film Awards	Best Actor	Vince Colosimo, Luke Ford, Christopher Connelly, Matthew Newton, Robert Rabiah, Josh Saks	Nominated
2011	Inside Film Awards	Best Actress	Sigrid Thornton, Ra Chapman, Laura Gordon, Lauren Clair	Nominated
2011	Inside Film Awards	Best Direction	Michael Rymer	Nominated
2011	Inside Film Awards	Best Editing	Sasha Dylan Bell	Nominated
2011	Inside Film Awards	Best Script	Michael Rymer	Nominated

== Home media ==
Face to Face was released on DVD by Umbrella Entertainment in May 2012.
