= Dream Home (play) =

Australian comedic play

- Original language: English
- Written by: David Williamson

Premiere
- Date: 2015
- Place: Ensemble Theatre, Sydney

Dream Home is a comedy play by David Williamson. It had its world premiere in January 2015 at the Ensemble Theatre in a production directed by Williamson himself.

== Plot ==
Young couple Dana and Paul buy an apartment in Bondi but struggle with troublesome neighbours and their hefty mortgage.

== Background ==
Williamson says he was inspired to write the play watching his five children attempt to buy into the property market.

It's obvious that the ease with which my generation moved into houses has disappeared... This generation it is extremely hard for them to get into real estate. I've watched all my kids struggling and it's almost true that unless the baby boomer parents use some of their ill-gotten gains to help the next generation it's almost impossible to get into a house... Life seemed a breeze... [in his early adult years]... Cheap houses, plenty of jobs and now the cutthroat competition to get jobs, to get a house, it's a different ball game for my kids.
