= Jack of Hearts (play) =

Play by David Williamson

- Original language: English
- Written by: David Williamson
- Genre: comedy

Premiere
- Date: 2016
- Place: Ensemble Theatre, Sydney

Jack of Hearts is an Australian comedy play by David Williamson.

== Plot ==
Emma leaves her husband Jack, a lawyer, after he quits his stressful job to pursue creative ambitions. The marriage of their friends, Denys and Stu, is also ending, due to Stu's rampant infidelity. The tensions between the characters comes to a head when Emma and her new partner, current-affairs journalist Carl, Stu and his mistress Nikki, and Denys all arrive at the island resort where Jack now works as a bellhop.

== Production ==
The play premiered at the Ensemble Theatre in Sydney. It starred Chris Taylor and Craig Reucassel from The Chaser as Jack and Stu, respectively.
