= Siren (play) =

1990 play by David Williamson

- Original language: English
- Written by: David Williamson
- Characters: 5M, 2F
- Genre: social comedy

Premiere
- Date: 1990

Siren is a 1990 play by Australian playwright David Williamson.

== Plot ==
In a central Coast motel room, Liz has been hired to seduce Billy Nottle, a local councillor suspected of accepting bribes from developers.

== Productions ==
Williamson gave the world premiere rights to Melbourne, which upset the Sydney Theatre Company, who had put on Emerald City with great success. A compromise was reached where the play opened in Sydney and Melbourne simultaneously, but Melbourne began 15 minutes earlier. The Sydney production was directed by Richard Wherret, the Melbourne one by Graeme Blundell. The Sydney production starred Andrea Moor who had been in Emerald City.

== Reception ==
Reviewing the 1990 Sydney production the Sunday Herald said "it cannot be counted among his successes." Sydney Morning Herald said "it's the writing, line by line, that lacks finesse."

Reviewing the 1990 Melbourne production The Age called it "a dismal affair... cynical, regressive and uninvolving."
