= Happiness (play) =

Play by David Williamson

- Original language: English
- Written by: David Williamson
- Genre: comedy

Premiere
- Date: May 2013
- Place: Ensemble Theatre, Sydney

Happiness is a 2013 play by David Williamson.

== Plot ==
Roland, a psychology professor, is an expert in the pursuit of happiness but finds he has trouble in his own life.
