= Born to Run (1977 film) =

1977 Australian-American film

- Directed by: Don Chaffey
- Written by: Ed Jurist
- Based on: The Boyds of Black River by Walter D. Edmonds
- Produced by: Jerome Courtland
- Starring: Robert Bettles; Tom Farley
- Cinematography: Geoff Burton
- Edited by: Peter Boita
- Music by: Ron Goodwin
- Production company: Walt Disney Productions
- Release date: 1977
- Running time: 87 minutes
- Countries: United States; Australia
- Language: English

Born to Run is a 1977 American-Australian family adventure film produced by Walt Disney Productions, directed by Don Chaffey and based on Walter D. Edmonds 1953 novel The Boyds of Black River. It was Walt Disney's second Australian film after Ride a Wild Pony in 1975. Shooting took place in 1976 in the Upper Hunter Valley.

== Release and reception ==
It played in cinemas in England in 1977 alongside The Rescuers and again in mid 1978.

1979 saw it split into two parts and shown on television on NBC-TV's The Wonderful World of Disney beginning on 25 March.

The film was given an Australian cinema release opening Easter Saturday 1979. The Sydney Morning Herald's Romola Costantino gave the film two stars out of four and comparing it to Disney's first Australian film said "This time they have come up with one of their less spectacular country adventures. Its mild drama is unlikely to upset even the smallest viewers."

Derham Groves in his book Walt Disney’s Forgotten Australia said he thought "Born to Run contained too many familiar Disney clichés".

== Cast ==
- Tom Farley as Matthew Boyd
- Robert Bettles as Teddy Boyd
- Andrew McFarlane as Doone Boyd
- Mary Ward as Aunt Marian Castle
- Julieanne Newbould as Cathy Castle
- Alexander Archdale as Callant
- Wyn Roberts as McGinnis
- Kit Taylor as Paul Sanford
- Gordon McDougall as Horace Weaver
- Les Foxcroft as Loafer
- Cul Cullen as Hawkins
- John Meillon as Delaney

== See also ==
- List of American films of 1977
- List of films about horses
- Cinema of Australia
