= Operator (play) =

Play by David Williamson

- Original language: English
- Written by: David Williamson

Premiere
- Date: 2005
- Place: Ensemble Theatre

Operator is a play by David Williamson. Williamson's son Rory played the lead role during its original production.
