= Managing Carmen =

Play written by David Williamson

- Original language: English
- Written by: David Williamson

Premiere
- Date: October 2012
- Place: Brisbane

Managing Carmen is a 2012 play by David Williamson about a cross-dressing football player.

The play was inspired by Williamson's concern over the influence of managers in Australian Rules Football.
