= Robert Rabiah =

Australian film actor

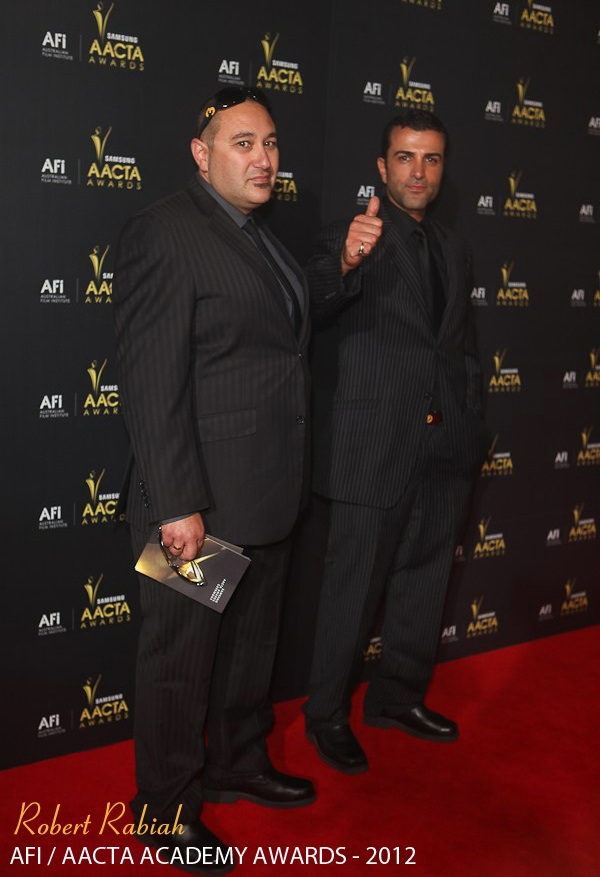
- Robert Rabiah at the 2012 AFI Awards
- Education: Beverly Hills Playhouse
- Occupations: Actor, writer, producer
- Years active: 1999 - present
- Awards: Australian Writers' Guild Award (Monte Miller Award for Unproduced Screenplay (with Evan Clarry)); Monaco Charity Film Festival Award (Best Actor)
- Website: robertrabiahofficial.com

Robert Rabiah is an Australian film actor, screen writer, and producer. He is best known for his roles as Hakim in Face to Face (2011), for which he was nominated for a AACTA Award for Best Supporting Actor in a Film and Best Actor at the Inside Film Awards, and as Bilal in Safe Harbour (2018) for which he was nominated at the Equity Ensemble Awards.

== Career ==
In 2000, Rabiah's first role was in the Australian film Chopper, alongside Eric Bana and Vince Colosimo. He got roles in television shows, including Blue Heelers, Stingers, Underbelly, Fat Tony & Co., and Neighbours. In 2004, he had a minor role in Evan Clarry's Under the Radar. In 2011, he was cast in Michael Rymer's Face To Face.

He later acted in the Australian romantic comedy film Ali's Wedding (2018), action film The Shinjuku Five, 2018 drama television series Safe Harbour, Deadline Gallipoli, Down Under, Secret City and Below.

Other roles include: Nick in Chopper, Dario Mancini in Fat Tony & Co., Spiro Politis on TV soap Neighbours, Mehmet in Deadline Gallipoli, Mohsen in Ali's Wedding, Paul `PK' Kallipolitis in Underbelly, and Sami Almasi in Secret City (TV series).

== Awards and nominations ==
Ceremony	Year	Award	Nominated work	Result	Ref.
AACTA Awards	2011	Best Supporting Actor	Face to Face	Nominated	
Inside Film Awards	2011	Best Actor	Face to Face	Nominated	
Monaco Charity Film Festival	2011	Best Actor in an ensemble cast	Face to Face	Won	
Australian Writers' Guild	2006	Monte Miller Award	Jericho	Won	

== Filmography ==
=== Film ===
Year	Title	Role	Notes
2024	Land of Bad	Saeed Hashimi	Feature film
2023	Tennessine	Nasser	Feature film
2022	Trail Blazers	Gabrielle	Feature film
2021	Double or Nothing	Eric	Feature film
2020	The Shinjuku Five	Victor	Feature film
2019	Below	King Ciggy	Feature film
2017	Romeo	Benvillo Montague	
2017	Fourth Wall	Joe	
2017	Antonio: Down Under		
2017	7 Storeys Down	Tommy	
2017	Ali's Wedding	Mohsen	Feature film
2016	The Perfect Nonsense	Dennis	
2016	Down Under	Amir	Feature film
2016	Bubblegum	Ali	
2015	Feel the Love	The Surgeon	
2015	Monkey Magic	Sandy	
2015	Blood Brothers	Jack Knox	
2015	Intikam	Murat	
2015	Nothing to Declare	Cantana	
2013	Farid in the West	Farid	Short film
2013	Monkey's in Heaven	Navin	Short film
2013	The Further I Run	Johnny	Short film
2011	Boston Tommy	Walter Wentworth	Short film
2011	Face to Face	Hakim	Feature film
2010	Shadows of the Night	New Nephew	Short film
2009	Out	Joel	Short film
2008	Four of a Kind	Paul	Feature film
2006	Glass	Hector	Short film
2005	Death Letter	Prison Guard 1	Short film
2005	Thin Walls	Steve	Short film
2005	The Speaking Role	Tom	Short film
2004	Under the Radar	Mario	Feature film
2003	Working Woman's Lie Detector	Gary	Short film
2002	Pros and Cons	Vernon	Short film
2001	Abschied in den Tod	Detective (uncredited)	
2000	Chopper	Nick	Feature film
2000	On the Beach	Cook Grantino	TV movie
2000	The Wog Boy	Pietro	Feature film

=== Television ===
Year	Title	Role	Notes
2023	Bay of Fires	Reg Brown	TV series
2023	Last King of the Cross	Jamour Ibrahim	TV miniseries, 4 episodes
2022	Irreverent	Farah	TV miniseries, 8 episodes
2021	Jack Irish	Mick Khoury	TV series, 1 episode
2020	AussieWood	Charlie Getz	TV series
2020	Informer 3838	Paul 'PK' Kallipolitis	TV miniseries, 1 episode
2019	The ShowBiz Podcast with Robert Rabiah and Joey Coley-Sowry	Self	Podcast Series
2019	Secret City	Sami Allmasi	TV series, 6 episodes
2018	Franco's World	Franco	5 episodes
2018	Safe Harbour	Bilal Al-Bayiati	TV miniseries, 4 episodes
2016	Tomorrow When the War Began	GDA	TV miniseries, 3 episodes
2015	Childhood's End	Saudi Businessman	TV series, 1 episode
2015	Deadline Gallipoli	Mehmet	TV miniseries, 2 episodes
2014	Cycles	Tom	TV series. 1 episode
2014	Fat Tony & Co.	Dario Mancini	TV miniseries, 5 episodes
2012	Der Staatsanwalt	Aussie Tourist	TV series, 1 episode
2011	Killing Time	Anthony Della Tranta	TV series, 2 episodes
2008	Underbelly	Paul 'PK' Kallipolitis	TV miniseries. 2 episodes
2006-07	Thank God You're Here	Guest Cast	TV series. 2 episodes
1998-04	Stingers	Various	TV series. 4 episodes
2004	Blue Heelers	Yusaf Zabir	TV series, 1 episode
1999	Tribe	Raoul	TV series, 4 episodes
1999	Journey to the Center of the Earth	Unsavory Man	TV miniseries
1999	Neighbours	Spirio	TV series, 10 episodes

=== Writer/Producer ===
Year	Title	Role	Notes
2023	This is Lebanon	Writer / Creator	Documentary
2020	AussieWood	Creator / Executive Producer	TV series
2019	The Showbiz Podcast	Creator / Producer	Podcast
2017	Antonio:Down Under	Writer	Pilot
2015	Blood Brothers	Writer	Film
2015	Breaking Down Nothing to Declare	Writer	
2015	Nothing to Declare	Writer	
2013	Monkey's in Heaven	Writer	Short film
2013	The Further I Run	Writer	Short film
2005	Death Letter	Writer	Short film
