= The Indecent Exposure of Anthony East =

Play written by David Williamson

- Original language: English
- Written by: David Williamson
- Characters: 2W 8M
- Setting: Anthony East's office in a large company

Premiere
- Date: 15 August 1968
- Place: University of Melbourne

The Indecent Exposure of Anthony East is a 1968 play by David Williamson.

It was Williamson's second completed play and his first play performed publicly. He wrote it in 1967 when working at Swinburne Tech.

It was produced by the Melbourne University student theatre group, Tin Alley Players. It was performed over three nights, and was directed by Christopher Bell with filmmaker Brian Davis playing the title role. It has never been revived.

William wrote a program note for the production:

There is a belief that an Australian writer is an inferior creature. This belief may not be shaken by tonight’s performance – but nevertheless I should like to thank the producer for helping to get this play into a shape which is at least workable, and for his courage in taking an ‘Australian’ production. We need an Australian Theatre because we are not Americans, Britons or Swedes, and, until local producers are prepared to do the hard work of finding potential playwrights, helping them to raise rough drafts and enabling them to learn from their own mistakes, we won’t get it.

In a 1995 interview Williamson called the play "shithouse. It had a stultifying effet on the individual audiences who tended to get, well, restless. That's the truth if it's no good. The setting is a huge industrial firm and a secret orchestra were wheeled in. It was about paranoia and trade unions. East hated all his fellow workers. Shithouse.""

== Premise ==
A corporate executive writes romantic fiction.

== Reception ==
According to a later report, the three performances cost $250 and grossed $175.
