= You've Got to Get on Jack =

Play by David Williamson

- Original language: English
- Written by: David Williamson
- Genre: comedy

Premiere
- Date: June 1970
- Place: La Mama, Melbourne

You've Got to Get On Jack is a 1970 one act play by David Williamson for the Australian Performing Group. The original cast included Alan Finney and Bruce Spence.

The play was presented with another one-act Williamson play, Sexual Follies.

The play was revived in 1971. This production received a good review by Katharine Brisbane in The Australian which Williamson remembers as the first positive encouragement he had received in print.
