= Money and Friends =

Play written by David Williamson

- Original language: English
- Written by: David Williamson
- Characters: 5 male, 4 female
- Subject: money friendship
- Genre: social comedy

Premiere
- Date: 28 November 1991
- Place: Suncorp Theatre, Brisbane

Money and Friends is a 1991 Australian play written by David Williamson. Its world premiere was at the Queensland Theatre Company directed by artistic director Aubrey Mellor.

== Plot ==
Mathematician Peter gets in financial trouble because of his brother's bankruptcy. His neighbour Margaret decides to seek help from his wealthy friends but they are reluctant to lend him money.

== Background ==
Williamson and his wife had a beach house north of Sydney (pearl beach). This community inspired him with the idea for the play:

This small beach community I've found over the years has tighter bondings than anything you find in the big city... I observed myself getting very affectionate to people and very attached to people that I normally wouldn't meet in the city... We were sitting on our deck one day", he continued, "and the talk was all of disaster, of friends, because this recession in Australia for the first time has hit the middle class, as well as the working class. There were a lot of professional people in Australia in 1990, when this play was set, suddenly finding themselves out of jobs. And I thought, 'What would happen to this little tribe if its most loved member suddenly had a personal financial disaster? Would anyone come to their aid?' And I started asking myself the question: 'If one of my friends suddenly was devastated through no fault of their own, would I write the check out?' And I wasn't sure I would.

== Production ==
Williamson has long felt that Australian theatre critics were hostile to his work. Prior to the opening of this play, he faxed five critics asking for a fair go. Williamson later says this was "ill-judged. To try to influence critics' opinion before the play is not something you should do and I wouldn't do it if I had my time over again".

== Reception ==
The play was enormously successful, touring Australia for a year. The play was also performed in the US directed by Michael Blakemore.

Fellow Australian playwright Louis Nowra said he never understood Williamson's popularity with audiences until he saw a production of Money and Friends.

I watched an audience laughing with recognition as the story unfolded and it occurred to me that Williamson was probably one of the few Australian playwrights who didn’t talk down to or at his audiences. He was one of them and he and the audience were engaged in a conversation as equals. His work was one gigantic affirmation of their lives and ideas. He didn’t undermine their beliefs, in fact, he corroborated them. One could say that, for his audiences, familiarity bred contentment.

No movie has been made of the play although Williamson thought it "would work well on film; I can say that because I’ve seen the Polish version, which they filmed very effectively as a television movie."
