= After the Ball (play) =

Play by David Williamson

- Author: David Williamson
- Cover artist: Cover photograph shows Penny Everingham as Kate (older) and Billie Brown as Stephen (older) in the 1997 Queensland Theatre Company production. Photo: Rob MacColl.
- Language: English
- Genre: Play
- Publisher: Currency Press
- Publication date: 1997
- Publication place: Australia
- Media type: Print (Paperback)
- ISBN: 978-0-86819-537-7

After the Ball is a play by Australian playwright David Williamson, published by Currency Press in 1997. Williamson wrote the play in response to his mother's death.

== Plot ==
The play is about Stephen, who has, with ill grace, returned home to his mother's deathbed. As he and his sister rake through the family photographs and childhood memories, they find conflicting versions of their parents’ unhappy marriage.

== Background ==
The play was partly inspired by the death of Williamson's mother in 1995.

== First Production ==
After the Ball was first produced by Queensland Theatre Company at the Suncorp Theatre, Brisbane, on 3 July 1997.

=== Cast ===
- Kate Macrae (older): Penny Everingham
- Judy Macrae (older): Jennifer Flowers
- Stephen Macrae (older): Bille Brown
- Ron Macrae: Max Gillies
- Kate Macrae (younger): Carol Burns
- Judy Macrae (younger) / nurse: Melissa McMahon
- Stephen Macrae (younger): Anthony Weigh
- Claire Cummins: Gael Ballantyne
- Maureen Donahue: Sally McKenzie

=== Crew ===
- Director: Robyn Nevin
- Designer: Bill Haycock
- Lighting Designer: David Walters
- Music: Max Lambert
