= Scarlett O'Hara at the Crimson Parrot =

Play written by David Williamson

- Original language: English
- Written by: David Williamson
- Subject: classic Hollywood, romance
- Genre: comedy fantasty

Premiere
- Date: 7 June 2008
- Place: Playhouse, Melbourne

Scarlett O'Hara at the Crimson Parrot is a play by David Williamson. It was written as a vehicle for Caroline O'Connor.

It was the Melbourne Theatre Company's second most popular play in 2008.

== Premise ==
Scarlett is a thirty-something waitress who lives with her mother and is obsessed with old movies. She has an active fantasy life and dreams of being with her boss, Steve, but is also pursued by the awkward Alan.
