= Corporate Vibes =

Play written by David Williamson

- Written by: David Williamson
- Original language: English
- Subject: satire

Premiere
- Date premiered: 1999
- Place premiered: Sydney

Corporate Vibes is an Australian play by David Williamson. It is a satire of the corporate world. The first production was directed by Robyn Nevin who said the play was about "growing up".

== Premise ==
A psychologist goes to work at a building company.

== Reception ==
The Sydney Morning Herald called the 1999 production "a slight and superficial play."
