= Nothing Personal (play) =

- Original language: English
- Written by: David Williamson

Premiere
- Date: 2011
- Place: Ensemble Theatre, Sydney

Nothing Personal is a 2011 play from David Williamson.

Williamson says he was prompted to write the play by Robyn Nevin of the Melbourne Theatre Company who asked him to do something "about people losing power and status as they get older". Williamson wrote Nothing Personal about a power struggle between two women in publishing, an older editor and her younger rival. But Nevin declined to produce it, feeling it was too close to Cate Blanchett replacing Nevin at the Sydney Theatre Company.

"She felt it was too close to her own situation," said Williamson. "Apparently Cate got annoyed at me, too. It never crossed my mind that the play could be seen to be about Robyn and Cate. Robyn had practically begged Cate to take over the STC. There was no back-stabbing, there was no knifing, whereas my play was all about machinations."

The STC and MTC declined to put on the play but they did hold a reading with Kate Fitzpatrick and Cate Blanchett. Williamson described the reading as "electric... Cate is a spellbinding actor. It would be my dearest dream to get her doing one of my parts. But at least I’ve heard her do one in a reading.”

Bob Ellis later accused David's wife of co-writing the play, an allegation Williamson passionately refuted.
