= Birthrights (play) =

Play by David Williamson

Birthrights / Soulmates
- Author: David Williamson
- Cover artist: Design: Kate Florance. Cover image shows: William Zappa as Danny and Jacki Weaver as Heather in the 2002 Sydney Theatre Company production of Soulmates. Photo: Tracey Schramm.
- Language: English
- Genre: Play
- Publisher: Currency Press
- Publication date: 2003
- Publication place: Australia
- Media type: Print (Paperback)
- ISBN: 978-0-86819-698-5

Birthrights is a 2003 play by David Williamson, published by Currency Press.

== Plot ==
At twenty-nine, Helen has a vital operation that stops her from having what she desperately wants: a child. Her younger sister Claudia gives her a wonderful gift when she agrees to be a surrogate mother. But what happens when, years later, Claudia discovers that she and her husband Martin cannot conceive and that Kelly, the child she gave to her sister, is the only baby she will ever bear?

== First production ==
Birthrights was first produced by Melbourne Theatre Company at the Playhouse, Victorian Arts Centre, on 16 April 2003, with the following cast:

HELEN DEAKIN: Doris Younane

CLAUDIA MCADAM: Maria Theodorakis

MARTIN: Peter Houghton

MARK: Kevin Harrington

MARGARET: MCADAM: Deidre Rubenstein

KELLY: Asher Keddie

Director, Tom Gutteridge

Designer, Louise McCarthy

Lighting Designer, David Walters

Sound Designer, David Franzke
