= Family Values (play) =

2020 play by David Williamson

- Written by: David Williamson
- Original language: English
- Genre: Social comedy

Premiere
- Date premiered: 2020
- Place premiered: Griffin Theatre, Sydney, Australia

Family Values is a 2020 play by David Williamson. It was inspired in part by Williamson's anger at Australia's treatment of refugees. As of 2020, it was his second last play.

== Plot ==
A judge is about to retire. On his 70th birthday, his eldest daughter attempts to shelter an asylum seeker, originally from Nauru, from the Australian Border Patrol, which causes familial strife.

== Background ==
Williamson said, “What kind of country have we become, to send people fleeing persecution to Nauru?” In particular he family of Tamil asylum seekers from Biloela. “My play is based on a lot of real events. I researched Nauru as fully as I could, I looked at the makeup of the people there and the women too, and it is an attempt to depict the situation truthfully.” He added, I also depict a family coming apart at the seams. There are lots of blackly funny moments based on the ideological positions of the children, which differ so widely.”

Williamson also wanted to explore the growth of religion in Australia.“ The influence of evangelism seems to be growing. When our current prime minister invites cameras into church to see him asking God for a favour ... it's troubling.”

“It’s a play in which people who shouldn’t be in the same room together have to be in the same room together because they’re related,” Williamson says. “So drama ensues – and comedy, too. Without that, the situation would be unbearable... It’s a big ask for any play, but I think it’s right on the fault lines of where we are now. Australia today is a deeply divided nation.”

The play had its world premiere at the Griffin. “I couldn’t be happier than having the circle close at Griffin,” he said. “John Bell’s production of The Removalists in 1972 was on that stage – back when it was called the Nimrod Theatre – and that established me as a writer more than anything else. My career as a playwright took off from there and it’s terrifically satisfying to come back to that wonderful. I’m back where I started, but I’m terribly happy to be there.”

== Critical reception ==
Ian Maxwell, writing for The Conversation about the 2020 Griffin Theatre Company production, called it an "uncomfortable, confronting play, rendered with care, intelligence and a carefully tempered earnest exuberance by an outstanding cast."

Writing for ArtsHub about the 2023 Queensland Theatre Company production, Lisette Drew noted that the play "is a thought-provoking play asking its audience to question their own family values and consider that perhaps changing the world begins at our own dinner table."
