= A Conversation =

Play written by David Williamson

- Written by: David Williamson
- Original language: English

Premiere
- Date premiered: 2001

A Conversation is a play by the Australian author David Williamson. It was the second in his "Jack Manning trilogy" of plays about conferencing.
