= At Any Cost? =

Play written by David Williamson

At Any Cost
- Original language: English
- Written by: David Williamson; Mohamed Khadra

Premiere
- Date: 2011

At Any Cost? is a play by Australian playwright David Williamson.

The play deals with the topic of euthanasia and struggle in deciding whether or not to end one's life.

It was inspired by Williamson's experiences with the health system stemming from his heart condition. Unlike most of Williamson's plays, it was written in collaboration, with a doctor.
