= Cruise Control (play) =

- Original language: English
- Written by: David Williamson
- Genre: comedy

Premiere
- Date: April 2014
- Place: Ensemble Theatre, Sydney

Cruise Control is a 2014 play by David Williamson.

== Plot ==
Three couples - one Australian, one English, one American - encounter each other on a cruise.

== Background ==
Williamson said he was inspired by a cruise he took with his wife Kristin. When they arrived on board, they discovered that the dining seat allocations were fixed for the cruise. “You either dine with those people for seven nights in a row or you starve,” Williamson says. “You’re thrust into a situation where you have to coexist with people you don’t know, and I thought it was a great dramatic situation, if people find out that they absolutely loathe each other and things go from bad to worse.”

In 2005 Williamson had written an article about a cruise trip he took which had attracted criticism.
