= Charitable Intent =

2001 play by David Williamson

- Original language: English
- Written by: David Williamson
- Characters: 2M 6F

Premiere
- Date: La Mama Theatre 2001

Charitable Intent is a play by David Williamson.

It was the third in his trilogy of plays about community conferencing, loosely known as "the Jack Manning trilogy" because all three plays feature the character Jack Manning.
