= Let the Sunshine =

Play by David Williamson

- Original language: English
- Written by: David Williamson
- Genre: satirical comedy
- Setting: Noosa, Queensland

Premiere
- Date: 2010
- Place: Ensemble Theatre, Sydney

Let the Sunshine is a 2010 play by David Williamson.

The play received its world premiere at the Ensemble Theatre in Sydney.

== Premise ==
The children of two clashing families fall in love.

== Background ==
The play's setting was based on Noosa, where Williamson moved in the late 1990s, declaring "If Emerald City had been about the transition from Melbourne to Sydney, Let The Sunshine was about the sort of things Kristin and I faced moving from Sydney to Noosa.”

Williamson later said, "I’d used the real-life backdrop of our son Felix falling in love with a very successful girl whose father was a successful businessman who lived in Noosa. That was the factual basis of it, but the fictional characters were certainly nothing like the real ones. Although my bullying billionaire character, Ron, may have had a bit of a few locals in him. [Laughs]"

== External reviews ==
- Review at Stage Whispers
- Woodhead, Cameron (August 2, 2010). "Let the Sunshine". The Age.
- Review of 2010 Melbourne production at Crikey
