= David Williamson =

Australian dramatist and playwright (born 1942)

David Williamson AO
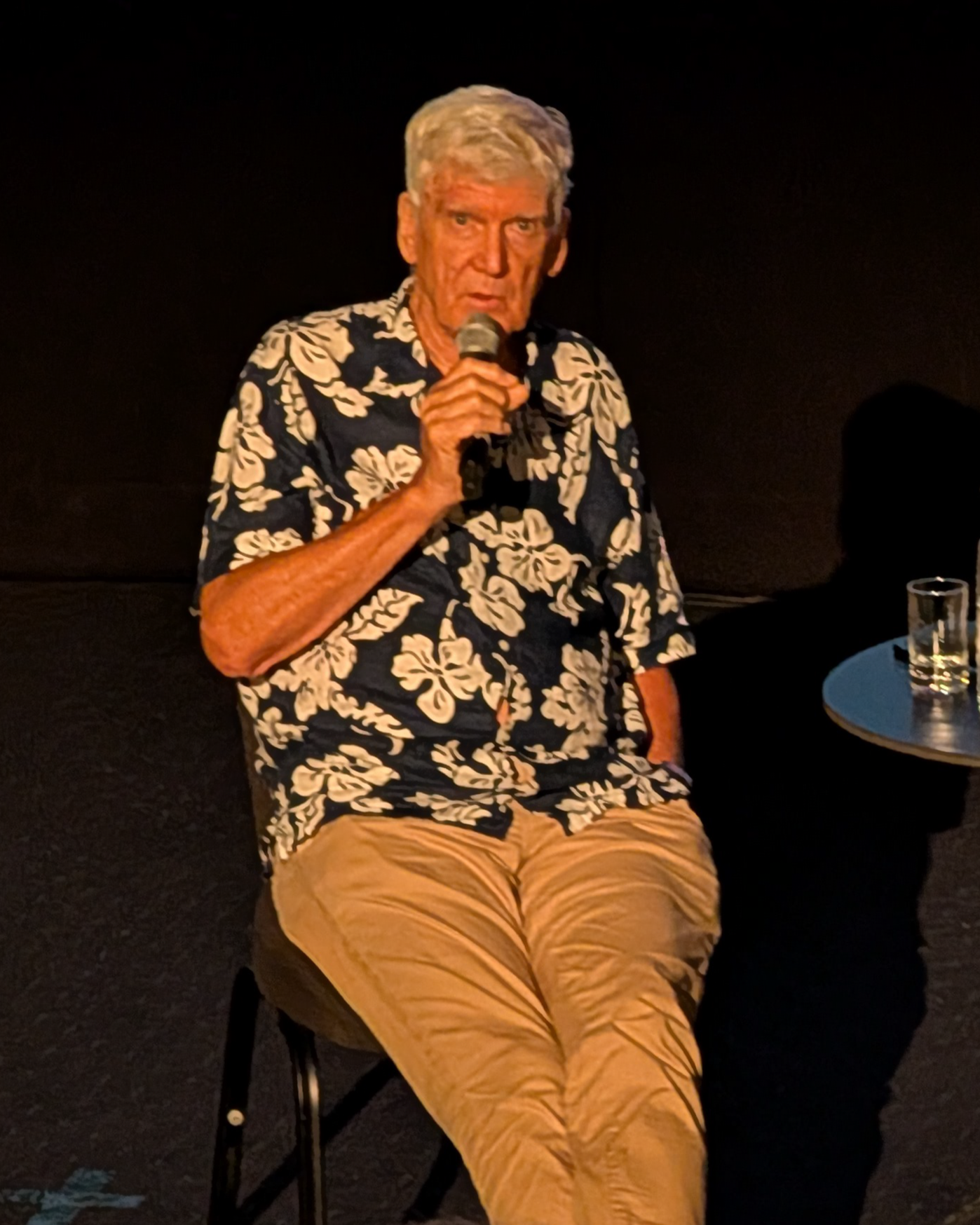
- Williamson speaking at the AACTA Festival in 2026
- Born: David Keith Williamson; February 24, 1942 (age 84); Melbourne, Victoria, Australia
- Occupations: Playwright, screenwriter
- Writing career
- Language: English
- Genres: Theatre, film, television
- Website: www.davidwilliamsonplaywright.com

David Keith Williamson (born 24 February 1942) is an Australian playwright, who has also worked in film and television. He became known in the early 1970s with his political comic drama Don's Party, and subsequently wrote the plays The Club, Travelling North, and Emerald City. He is also known for writing the 1981 war film Gallipolli.

== Early life and education ==
David Williamson was born in Melbourne, Victoria, on 24 February 1942, and was brought up in Bentleigh before his family moved to Bairnsdale in 1954. He initially studied mechanical engineering at the University of Melbourne from 1960, but left and graduated from Monash University with a Bachelor of Engineering degree in 1965. His early forays into the theatre were as an actor and writer of skits for the Engineers' Revue at Melbourne University's Union Theatre at lunchtime during the early 1960s, and as a satirical sketch writer for Monash University student reviews and the Emerald Hill Theatre Company.

After a brief stint as design engineer for GM Holden, Williamson became a lecturer in mechanical engineering and thermodynamics at Swinburne University of Technology (then Swinburne Technical College) in 1966 while studying social psychology as a postgraduate part-time at the University of Melbourne. He completed a Master of Arts in Psychology in 1970, and then completed further postgraduate research in social psychology. Williamson later lectured in social psychology at Swinburne, where he remained until 1972.

== Career ==
Williamson first turned to writing and performing in plays in 1967 with La Mama Theatre Company and the Pram Factory, and rose to prominence in the early 1970s, with works such as Don's Party (later turned into a 1976 film), a comic drama set during the 1969 federal election; and The Removalists (1971). He also collaborated on the screenplays for Gallipoli (1981) and The Year of Living Dangerously (1982). Williamson's work as a playwright focuses on themes of politics, loyalty and family in contemporary urban Australia, particularly in two of its major cities, Melbourne and Sydney.

Major stage works include The Club, The Department, Travelling North, The Perfectionist, Emerald City, Money and Friends and Brilliant Lies.

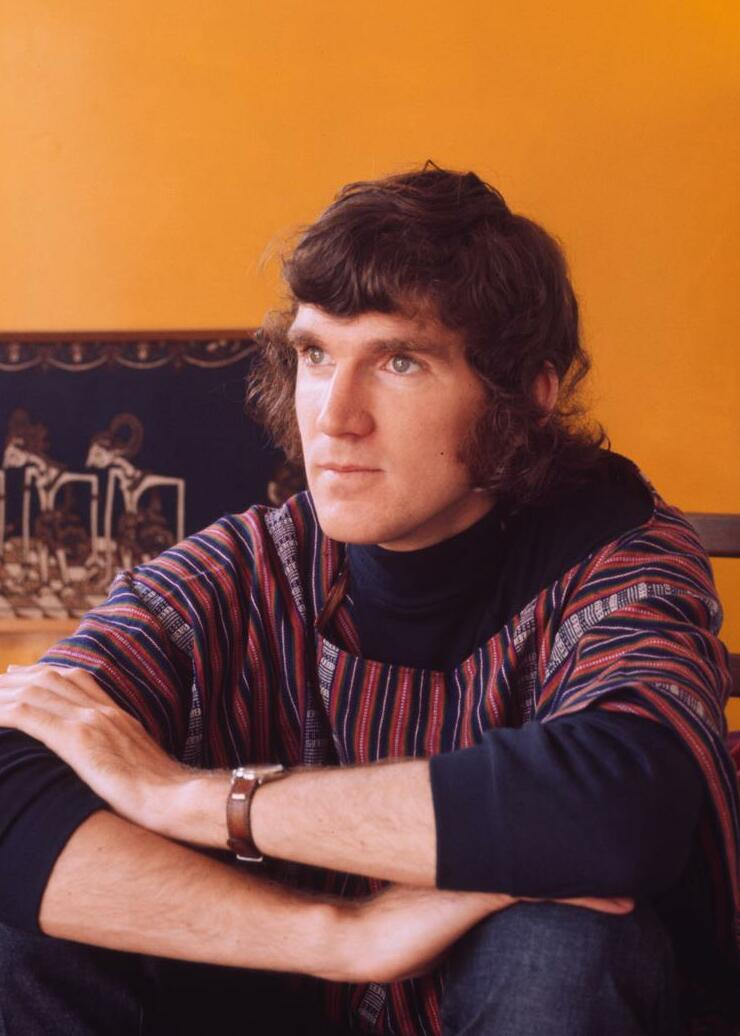
Williamson in 1972

Recent work has included Dead White Males, a satirical approach to postmodernism and university ethics; Up for Grabs, which starred Madonna in its London premiere; and the Jack Manning Trilogy (Face To Face, Conversation, Charitable Intent) which take as their format community conferencing, a new form of restorative justice, in which Williamson became interested in the late 1990s and early 2000s.

In recent years he has alternated work between larger stages (including Soul Mates, Amigos and Influence – all premiered with the Sydney Theatre Company) and smaller ones (including the Manning trilogy, Flatfoot and Operator, which premiered at the Ensemble Theatre).

In 2005, he announced his retirement from main-stage productions, although he has continued to write new plays for the mainstage, many produced with the Ensemble Theatre. He had a serious health problem, cardiac arrhythmia, which had required frequent hospitalisation. An operation resolved this issue, but then in 2009 he had a mild stroke, from which he recovered fully.

In 2007, Lotte's Gift, a one-woman show starring Karin Schaupp, which traced a journey through Schaupp's own life as well as those of her mother and grandmother (the Lotte of the title), was produced.

In 2021, his memoir, Home Truths, was published by HarperCollins. Reviewing the book for The Sydney Morning Herald, Peter Craven wrote "He comes across as a likeable, flawed fellow with no more blindness than people of lesser talent".

== Other activities ==
Williamson was instrumental in the founding of the Noosa Long Weekend Festival, a cultural festival in Noosa, Queensland, where he lives.

In August 2006 Cate Molloy, former Australian Labor Party member of the Queensland Parliament for Noosa, announced that Williamson would be her campaign manager as she sought to recontest her seat as an Independent.

== Personal life ==
Williamson is married to Kristin Williamson (sister of independent filmmaker Chris Löfvén) who have homes in Sydney and on Queensland's Sunshine Coast. They have five adult children.

His son, Rory Williamson, and his stepson, Felix Williamson, are both actors. Rory starred as Stork in the 2001 revival of The Coming of Stork at the Stables Theatre in Sydney, produced by Felix's company, the Bare Naked Theatre Company.

== Honours and awards ==
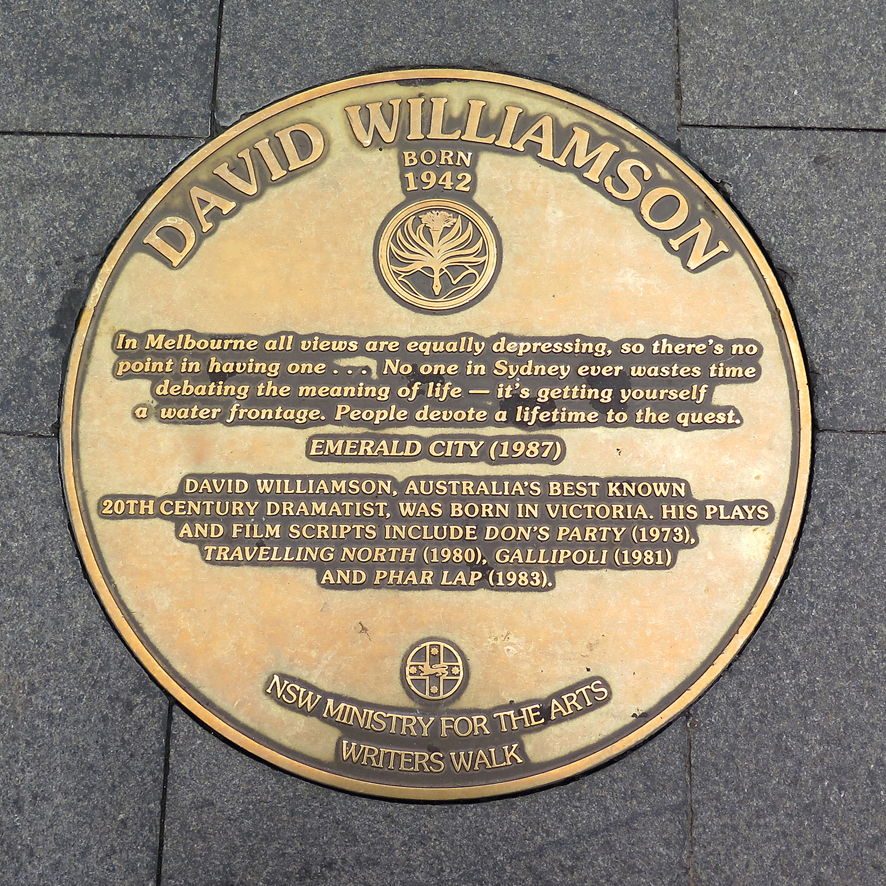
Plaque in the Sydney Writers Walk series at Circular Quay commemorating David Williamson, with a quote from Emerald City

- 1971 – British George Devine Award
- 1972 – Australian Writers Guild Awgie Award for best stage play and best script with The Removalists
- 1983 – appointed an Officer of the Order of Australia
- 1988 – Honorary Doctor of Letters, University of Sydney
- 1990 – Honorary Doctor of Letters, Monash University
- 1995 – Human Rights and Equal Opportunity Commission Drama Award for Sanctuary
- 1996 – chosen to deliver the inaugural Andrew Olle Media Lecture
- 1996 – Honorary Doctor of Letters, Swinburne University of Technology
- 2004 – Honorary Doctor of Letters, University of Queensland
- 2012 – Nominated Senior Australian of the Year

=== Australian Film Institute Awards ===
- 1977 – AFI Award, Best Screenplay, Original or Adapted, Don's Party
- 1981 – AFI Award, Best Screenplay, Original or Adapted, Gallipoli
- 1987 – AFI Award, Best Screenplay, Adapted, Travelling North
- 2009 – AFI Award, Best Screenplay, Adapted, Balibo (shared with director Robert Connolly)

=== Helpmann Awards ===
The Helpmann Awards is an awards show, celebrating live entertainment and performing arts in Australia, presented by industry group Live Performance Australia (LPA) since 2001. In 2005, Williamson received the JC Williamson Award, the LPA's highest honour, for their life's work in live performance.

Year	Nominee / work	Award	Result
2005	Himself	JC Williamson Award	awarded

== Writings ==
=== Plays ===
- The Indecent Exposure of Anthony East (1968)
- You've Got to Get on Jack (1970)
- The Coming of Stork (1970)
- The Removalists (1971)
- Don's Party (1971)
- Jugglers Three (1972)
- What If You Died Tomorrow? (1973)
- The Department (1975)
- A Handful of Friends (1976)
- The Club (1977)
- Travelling North (1979)
- Celluloid Heroes (1980)
- The Perfectionist (1982)
- Sons of Cain (1985)
- Emerald City (1987)
- Top Silk (1989)
- Siren (1990)
- Money and Friends (1991)
- Brilliant Lies (1993)
- Sanctuary (1994)
- Dead White Males (1995)
- Heretic (1996)
- Third World Blues (1997, adaptation of Jugglers Three)
- After The Ball (1997)
- Corporate Vibes (1999)
- Face to Face (2000)
- The Great Man (2000)
- Up for Grabs (2001)
- A Conversation (2001)
- Charitable Intent (2001)
- Soulmates (2002)
- Flatfoot (2003)
- Birthrights (2003)
- Amigos (2004)
- Operator (2005)
- Influence (2005)
- Lotte's Gift (2007) – also known as Strings Under My Fingers
- Scarlett O'Hara at the Crimson Parrot (2008)
- Let the Sunshine (2009)
- Rhinestone Rex and Miss Monica (2010)
- Don Parties On (2011)
- At Any Cost? (2011)
- Nothing Personal (2011)
- When Dad Married Fury (2011)
- Managing Carmen (2012)
- Happiness (2013)
- Rupert (2013)
- Cruise Control (2014)
- Dream Home (2015)
- Jack of Hearts (2016)
- Credentials (2017)
- Odd Man Out (2017)
- Sorting Out Rachel (2018)
- Nearer the Gods (2018)
- The Big Time (2019)
- Family Values (2020)
- Crunch Time (2020)
- The Great Divide (2024)
- Aria (2024)
- The Puzzle (2024)
- Sleeping Dogs (2025)
- The Social Ladder (2026)

=== Screenplays ===
- Stork (1971) – based on his play
- Libido (1972) – segment "The Family Man"
- Petersen (1974)
- The Removalists (1975) – based on his play
- Eliza Fraser (1975)
- Don's Party (1976) – based on his play
- The Department (1980) (TV movie) – based on his play
- The Club (1980) – based on his play
- Gallipoli (1981)
- Duet for Four (1982)
- The Year of Living Dangerously (1983)
- Phar Lap (1983)
- The Last Bastion (1984) (TV series) – also produced
- The Perfectionist (1987) (TV movie) – based on his play
- Travelling North (1987) - based on his play
- Emerald City (1987) – based on his play
- Touch the Sun: Princess Kate (1988) (TV)
- A Dangerous Life (1988) (TV mini-series)
- The Four Minute Mile (1988)
- Sanctuary (1995) – based on his play
- Brilliant Lies (1996) – based on his play
- Dog's Head Bay (1999) (TV series) – 13 episodes
- On the Beach (2000) (TV series)
- Balibo (2009)
- Face to Face (2011) – based on his play
