= Cliff Ellen =

Australian actor

- Born: 22 March 1936 (age 90); Melbourne, Victoria, Australia
- Occupation: Actor
- Years active: 1972–2018
- Family: Joff Ellen

Cliff Ellen (born 22 March 1936) is an Australian character actor who played a prominent guest role on the soap opera Neighbours as Charlie Cassidy.

His first role was in Homicide. His credits include Crackerjack, Garbo, and Phar Lap. A theatre actor of many years, Ellen played the role of Gaston in the Australian touring production of Steve Martin's Picasso at the Lapin Agile as well as Hannie Rayson's Inheritance. He also appeared in the 2006 Australian film BoyTown. Ellen writes a column for a local newspaper based on the Mornington Peninsula.

Cliff Ellen is the nephew of Joff Ellen, Australian television actor and comedian

== Filmography ==
=== Film ===
Title	Year	Role	Type
Petersen	1974	1st Bushman	Feature film
The Firm Man	1975	Carl	Feature film
The Great Macarthy	1975	Player	Feature film
Mad Dog Morgan	1976	Extra	Feature film
The Trespassers	1976	Barman	
Squizzy Taylor	1982	Paper Man	Feature film
Phar Lap	1983	Float Driver	Feature
Wrong World	1985	Old Man	Feature film
The Four Minute Mile	1988	Jim Johnson	TV movie
Proof	1991	Cemetery caretaker	Feature film
Garbo	1992	Desk Sergeant	Feature film
Paperback Romance	1994	Airline Porter	Feature film
Crackerjack	2002	Norm	Feature film
Roy Hollsdotter Live	2003	Gil	TV movie
BoyTown	2006	Bertie	Feature film
Noise	2007	Elderly Man	Feature film
Josh Jarman	2004	Theatre actor	Feature film
Tom White	2004	Tiger	Feature film
Red Hill	2010	Gleason	Feature film
I Love You Too	2010	Cliff	Feature film

=== Television ===
Title	Year	Role	Type
Matlock Police	1974	Storekeeper	TV series
Cash and Company	1975	Ridley	TV miniseries
Division 4	1974–1975	3 character roles	TV series
Bluey	1976–1977		TV series
Against the Wind	1978	Warder	TV miniseries
Skyways	1979	Charlie Higgins	TV series
Water Under the Bridge	1980	Kitchen Man	TV miniseries
I Can Jump Puddles	1981	Drunk	TV miniseries
Cop Shop	1978–1981	3 character roles	TV series
Come Midnight Monday	1982	Clifford	TV series
The Sullivans	1978–1982	3 character roles	TV series
Home	1983	Arnold	TV series
All the Rivers Run	1983	Elijah	TV miniseries
Special Squad	1984	Priester	TV series
Carson's Law	1983–1984	3 character roles	TV series
The Flying Doctors	1985	Charlie the postman	TV miniseries
The Fast Lane	'1985	Brooks	TV series
Prisoner	1983–1985	3 character roles	TV series
Sentiments	1988	Chicken Man	TV series
The Bartons	1988	Coach	TV series
Boys from the Bush	1991	Toddy	TV series
The Flying Doctors	1991	Bert	,TV series
Chances	1991	Celebrant	TV series
Phoenix	1993	Harry	TV series
Bingles	1992–1993	Ron	TV series
Snowy	1993	Cec Brookes	TV miniseries
A Country Practice	1994	Angus Coe	TV series
The Games	1998	Harry Gibbs	TV series
MDA	2002–2003	Judge Michaels	TV series
Stories from the Golf	2004	Ted	TV series
Blue Heelers	1994–2004	3 character roles	TV series
Neighbours	1996–2005	Angry Man / Charlie Cassidy	TV series
Let Losse Live	2005	Hospital Patient	TV series
East of Everything	2008	Dale's Dad (voice)	TV series
Rush	2008	Des	TV series
The Librarians	2010	Senior Citizen	TV series
Bed of Roses	2010–2011	Clem	TV series
Romper Stomper	2018	Martin Jordon	TV miniseries
