= Lesley Baker =

Australian film and television actress

- Born: 20 January 1944 (age 82); Melbourne, Victoria, Australia
- Occupations: Actress; singer; dancer; comedian
- Years active: Theatre 1963–1981; Screen 1969–present
- Known for: In Melbourne Tonight (TV series); Prisoner as Monica Ferguson / 'Tinker' Bell Peters; Neighbours (TV series) as Angie Rebecchi
- Children: 1

Lesley Baker (born 20 January 1944) is an Australian actress, singer, dancer and comedian. She is best known internationally for her small screen roles in cult series Prisoner and her recurring role in Neighbours.

== Career ==
Baker started her career, participating in a comedy revue in 1963, which in turn lead to a starring role in a production of the musical comedy How to Succeed in Business Without Really Trying when she was 19. She then appeared on Australian variety television show In Melbourne Tonight with Graham Kennedy, for a year, performing comedy sketches, hosting and singing.

She played several lead stage roles including Fanny Brice in a Sydney season of Funny Girl, and Madame Rose in the first ever Australian production of Gypsy. Further musical stage comedies, and television variety work followed.

In 1971 Baker secured her own television morning show, The Incredible Lesley Baker Show. However, this proved to be short-lived, as internal politics prevented the show from continuing, so she took a short hiatus from acting, to travel and work as a secretary in London. She returned to Australia in 1973 to resume her acting career.

Baker segued into drama roles, predominantly in Crawford Productions series. She is best known for her TV soap opera roles including that of hulking husband basher, Monica Ferguson, in early episodes of Prisoner in 1979. She left the show after eight months, to care for her young son, however, in 1982, she returned to the series, playing the character of 'Tinker' Bell Peters.

Baker began playing the itinerant role of Angie Rebecchi in Neighbours in January 1995. Baker received a call from casting director Jan Russ offering her the guest role of Angie for an initial three week period. Stonefish Rebecchi (Anthony Engelman) had been in the series since 1994 and they wanted to build a family unit around his character. The producers loved her appearance and she proved popular with viewers, so Angie was written back into Neighbours as a regular ongoing role, alongside her husband "Big Kev" (Don Bridges), eldest son Shane Rebecchi (Greg O'Mera), and youngest son Toadie Rebecchi (Ryan Moloney).

In 1996, Angie was written out of Neighbours, however, she has continued to appear on the series. Baker was one of over twenty actors who reprised their roles for the serial's then-final episode in 2022, and the first few episodes of the 2023 continuation with her return being a surprise for viewers.

Baker has guest-starred in numerous other Australian television dramas and television variety shows. Her feature film credits include Eliza Frazer (1976) and Spotswood (1991).

== Personal life ==
When Baker returned to Australia in 1973, she married teacher and part-time actor Graham Haines. She gave birth to their first child, a son, in 1977. Their son suffered brain damage at birth and was later diagnosed with psychomotor retardation. Baker and Haines separated and she had to put a stop to her acting career in order to care for her son. She later suffered an emotional breakdown. Baker revealed in a 2003 interview that she remains the sole-carer to her son, which means she cannot have a full-time job.

== Filmography ==
=== Television ===
Year	Title	Role	Notes
1970	The Long Arm	The Nurse; Const. Brenda Davis	2 episodes: "The Big Circle" (#1.8), "The Christmas Break"(#1.13)
1974	Rush		Episode: "They Faced all the Dangers, Those Bold Bushrangers" (#1.3)
1969–76	Homicide	Various	8 episodes
1970–75	Division 4	Various	8 episodes
1971–76	Matlock Police	Various	9 episodes
1973	The Paul Hogan Show	Guest	
1975	The Last of the Australians	Ms. Ferguson	Episode: "Ashes to Ashes" (#2.4)
1976	Solo One	Mrs. Pickett	Episode: "My Bonnie" (#1.7)
1976	Bellbird	Cheryl Turner #2	Episode: "Coming Home" (#1520)
1976	Alvin Purple	Myrtle	Episode: "Ciao Alvin" (#1.13)
1977	Bluey	Leslie Stewart	Episode: "Emma" (#1.15)
1978–81	Cop Shop	Various	5 episodes
1979	Skyways	Gladys Skinner (as Leslie Baker)	Episode: "Donny's Father" (#1.142)
1979	Prisoner	Monica Ferguson	36 episodes: 15–18, 29–60
1980	Water Under the Bridge	Nurse Vickers	Miniseries, 3 episodes
1981	I Can Jump Puddles	Matron	Miniseries, 2 episodes
1981	Holiday Island	Gladys	Episode: "Hang Glider - Part 2" (#1.44)
1983	Prisoner	Belle 'Tinker' Peters	3 episodes: 390–392
1984	Carson's Law	Nurse	Episode: "Fallen into Darkness"
1984	Special Squad	Chamber Maid	Episode: "Counterfeit Lady" (#1.5)
1986	Whose Baby?	Marge	Miniseries
1986, 1988–89	The Flying Doctors	Mrs. Jackson; Lucy Somers	5 episodes: "Sins of the Fathers" (#1.8), "Don't Tell Anyone" (#3.24), "Breaking the Drought (#4.8), "All You Need is Luck" (#4.11), "Rising Sundown (#5.6)
1988	The Bartons	Mrs. Davis	2 episodes: "Half Time" (#1.3), "The Great Billycart Aid Rave" (#1.6)
1990	Skirts	Doris	
1990	Col’n Carpenter	Irene	Episode: "Pop the Question" (#2.10)
1992	Bony	Boarding House Lady	Episode: "Looks Can Kill" (#1.2)
1993	Phoenix	Woman Farmer (as Leslie Baker)	Episode: "In on the Joke" (#2.8)
1994	Wedlocked		
1994, 1997, 2001, 2004	Blue Heelers	Various	5 episodes
1995–96; 2002–06, 2008, 2013, 2015; 2017–19, 2022–23	Neighbours	Angie Rebecchi	TV series, 176 episodes
1997, 1998	Good Guys, Bad Guys	Rose; Ms. Pinney	2 episodes: "Angel'’ (#1.11), "Naughty Bits (#2.5)
1999	Stingers	Maggie Robardi	Episode: "Just Acting" (#2.13)
2000	SeaChange	Mrs. Chatham	Episode: "Pipeline" (#3.5)
	Something in the Air	Female Caller	
2001	Shock Jock	Rita	3 episodes: "Exposure" (#1.3), "Mein Diary" (#1.5), "One for the Road" (#1.6)
2008–09	City Homicide	Miriam Toffler	2 episodes: "Taniwha" (#2.4), "In Wolf’s Clothing" (#3.17)
2009	The Librarians	Christine's Nan	Episode: "Romeos and Juliets" (#2.4)
2017	Neighbours: Summer Stories	Angie Rebecchi	TV series, 2 episodes

=== Film ===
Year	Title	Role	Notes
1976	Eliza Frazer		Feature film
1987	Slate, Wyn & Me	Molly	Feature film
1992	Spotswood (aka The Efficiency Expert)	Gwen	Feature film (as Leslie Baker)
1993	Body Melt	Mack	Feature film
1995	Angel Baby	Rose	Feature film
2008	Tea and Physics	Granny	Short film
2009	Inanimate Objects	Sam Graham	Film

=== Other appearances ===
Year	Title	Role	Notes
1965	Graham Kennedy's Channel 9 Show	Guest (singing with Graham Kennedy)	TV series, 1 episode
1969–70	In Melbourne Tonight	Comedian, co-host, singer	TV series
1971	The Incredible Lesley Baker Show	Host	TV series, 6 episodes

== Theatre ==
Year	Title	Role	Notes
1963	The Maids	Solange	University of Melbourne with The Marlowe Society
1963	Where Do We Go From Here?		St Martins Theatre, Melbourne
1963	How to Succeed in Business Without Really Trying	Smitty	Her Majesty's Theatre, Melbourne, His Majesty's Theatre, Perth, Her Majesty's Theatre, Adelaide with J. C. Williamson
1966	Funny Girl	Fanny Brice	Her Majesty's Theatre, Sydney, Theatre Royal Sydney, Her Majesty's Theatre, Melbourne, Her Majesty's Theatre, Adelaide
1967	Gypsy	Madame Rose	Menzies Theatre Restaurant, Sydney
1968	Oh, What a Lovely War!	The Pierrots	Comedy Theatre, Melbourne with J. C. Williamson & St Martins Youth Arts Centre
1969	Annie Get Your Gun	Dolly Tate (understudy)	Lido Theatre Restaurant, Melbourne
1969	Invitation to a March	Deedee Grogan	St Martins Theatre, Melbourne
1970	Promises, Promises	Sylvia Gilhooley	Theatre Royal Sydney with J. C. Williamson
1971	Caroline	Mrs Winthrop	St Martins Theatre, Melbourne, Playhouse, Canberra
1975	Gypsy	Madame Rose	Her Majesty's Theatre, Sydney with J. C. Williamson
1976	Halfway at Easter	Clare	Kew Community Theatre, Melbourne with Original Theatrical Enterprises
	Red, White n Boogie Theatre Restaurant		
1980	The Bull 'n' Bush Theatre Restaurant		The Gold Diggers Room, Warrandyte with Red Riding Hood Productions
1981	Bull 'n' Bush Burlesque		The Gold Diggers Room, Warrandyte with Terry Gill Productions
	The Naughty Nineties Theatre Restaurant		Terry Gill Productions
