= Lisa Aldenhoven =

Australian film and television actress

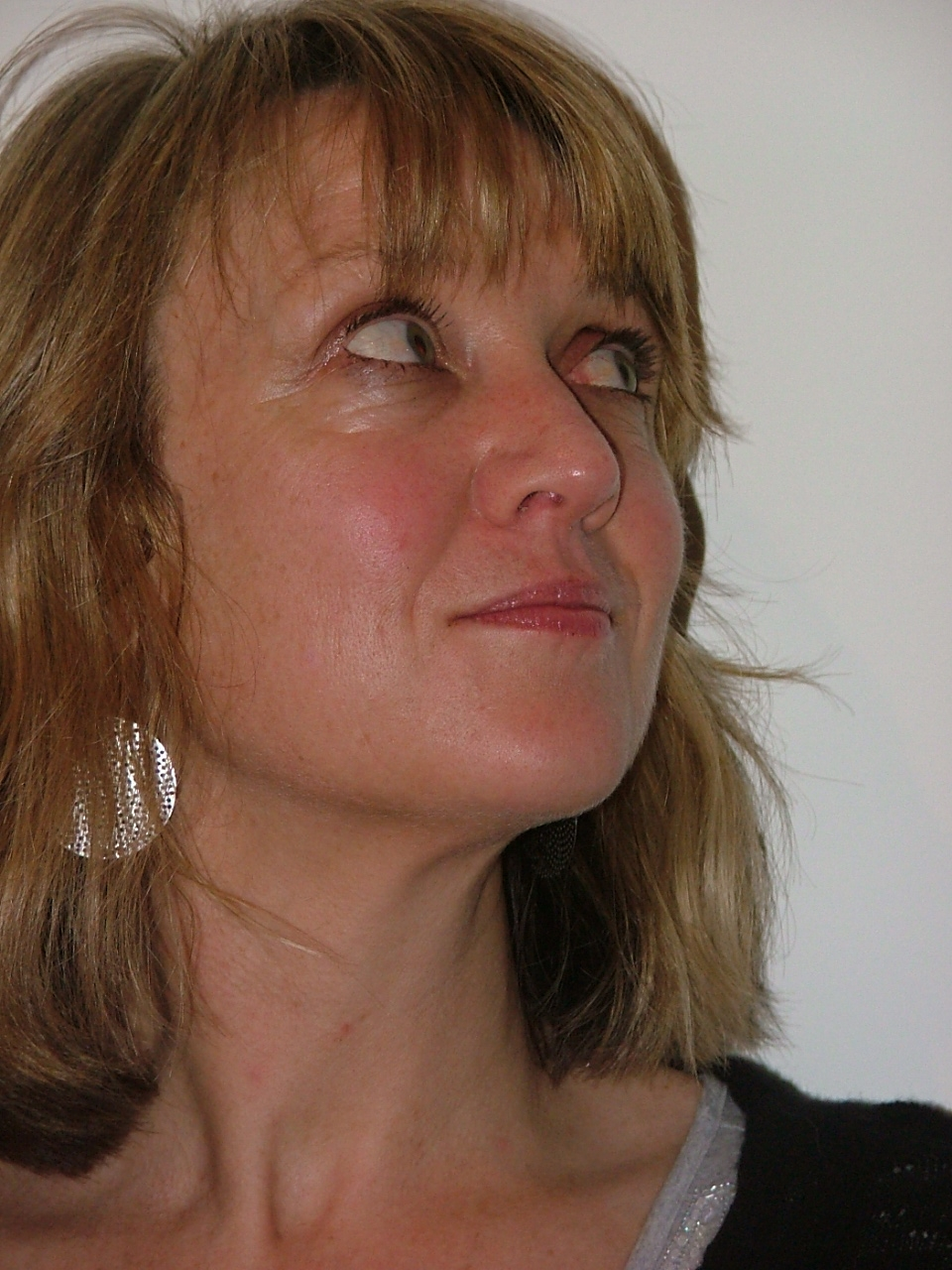
- Born: 1959 (age 66–67); Melbourne, Australia
- Occupation: Actress
- Years active: 1967–current
- Known for: The Young Doctors

Lisa Aldenhoven (born c.1959) is an Australian film and television actress.

== Career ==
Aldenhoven remains best known for her role in the television soap opera The Young Doctors as Nurse Julie Holland. She appeared in the series from 1978 to 1981.

Aldenhoven made a guest appearance in Prisoner, appearing in the first episode as ill-fated inmate Sally Lee. She was invited back several years later to play another guest role. She also had guest roles in the first two episodes of Cop Shop – as a child prostitute and in later episodes as a pregnant school girl. Other television credits include Carson's Law, Holiday Island, I Can Jump Puddles, The Truckies, Special Squad and the miniseries Whose Baby?.

She has also appeared in several movies, including Mad Max, The Getting of Wisdom, Blue Fire Lady, Death of a Soldier and Brilliant Lies.

Aldenhoven now works in PR and marketing.

== Filmography ==
=== Film ===
Year	Title	Role	Type
1977	Blue Fire Lady	Office Receptionist	Feature film
1977	The Getting of Wisdom		Feature film
1979	Mad Max	Nurse	Feature film
1986	Death of a Soldier	Girl #1 in Bar	Feature film
1996	Brilliant Lies	Stephanie Fitzgerald	Feature film

=== Television ===
Year	Title	Role	Type
1977; 1978	Cop Shop	Kathy Curtis / Bronwyn Paton	TV series, 4 episodes
1978	The Truckies		TV series
1979–1981	The Young Doctors	Nurse Julie Holland	TV series, 428 episodes
1979; 1983	Prisoner	Sally Lee / Cheryl Armstrong	TV series, 3 episodes
1981	I Can Jump Puddles	Mamie	Miniseries, episode 7: "Take It or Leave It"
1981	Holiday Island	Dee Dawson	TV series, episode 36: "The Castaway – Part 2"
1983	Home	Nurse	TV series, 2 episodes
1983; 1984	Carson's Law	Leila Booth / Nurse	TV series, 2 episodes
1984	Special Squad	Gina Grazini	TV series, episode 8: "The Würzburg Link"
1986	Whose Baby?	Colleen Morrison (adult)	Miniseries, episode 2
2002	Short Cuts	Mrs Frischmann	TV series, episode 21: "Party On, Rhys"
2009	Rush	Jennifer	TV series, season 2, episode 12
2012	Offspring	Cheryl Collee	TV series, season 3, episode 3: "Fertility Woes"
2018	Neighbours	Lesley Taylor	TV series, episode 7854
