= Vic Gordon =

Australian actor (1911–2003)

- Vic Gordon, appearing in TV series "Prisoner" as Dr.Bauscomb
- Born: Vincent Gordon; 4 March 1909; City ofLondon, Greater London, England, United Kingdom
- Died: 2 December 2003 (aged 94); Melbourne, Victoria, Australia
- Other name: Funnyface Gordon
- Occupations: Actor; vaudevillian; comedian; singer
- Known for: Matlock Police as Bert Kennedy; Young Ramsay as Jack Lambert; Roles in Homicide and Division 4 series; The Happy Show
- Children: 3
- Family: Jacqui Gordon (step-daughter), Tony Horswell (son)

Vincent Gordon (4 March 1909 – 2 December 2003) was a British Australian character actor of vaudeville, television and film, and comedian and singer, who best known for his achievements in the fields of drama, light entertainment, music and comedy.

Gordon started his career in his native United Kingdom, where he worked all major sectors including theatre, variety, pantomime, radio, and film.

After emigrating to Australia in 1959, aged 50,he continued his stage and screen career, primarily he was known for his local TV role's, especially Matlock Police and in his later years was a highly recognisable character actor on television, including playing 4 different roles on cult TV series Prisoner (known internationally as "Prisoner: Cell Block H") between 1980 and 1986 and guest roles on numerous TV soap's and serials.

== Biography ==
Vic Gordon was born in March 1909 in City of London, Greater London, England. He moved to Australia in 1959 where his early performances were in comedy and vaudeville alongside celebrities such as Maurie Fields, Val Jellay and Peter Colville. He was known as Vic "Funnyface" Gordon on the HSV-7 Melbourne and ATN-7 Sydney television afternoon children's programme: The Happy Show (1960–1965), with Harry "Happy" Hammond.

Gordon, like many early Australian TV actors, was a staple of the Crawford Productions serials . He appeared in 16 different roles in Homicide and 9 roles in Division 4,

In 1971 he took the regular role as the no-nonsense desk Sergeant Bert Kennedy, in the television production Matlock Police, staying in the serial for 5 years

He's later roles included Young Ramsay in a 12 month stint as Jack Lambert and included also smaller parts and recurring guest appearance's on series including Cop Shop, The Sullivans, The Flying Doctors, Blue Heelers and Neighbours.

== Personal life ==
Gordon was married to his first wife Josie, but three years after the death of his first wife Josie in 1971, he re-married to Jean Lochhead.

Gordon died in Melbourne, Victoria aged 94 on 2 December 2003.

== Filmography ==
=== Film ===
Year	Title	Role	Notes
1954	Panto Parade		TV movie
1956	Pantomime Tea Dance	Himself	TV movie
1982	Next of Kin	Montclare Resident	Feature film
1982	Lonely Hearts	Patricia's father	
1990	Quigley Down Under	Elderly Man	Feature film
1992	Garbo	Old Time Card Sharp	Feature film

=== TV series ===
Year	Title	Role	Notes
1960–1965	The Happy Show	Vic "Funnyface" Gordon	TV series
1966–1976	Homicide	George Roberts / Wally Blake / James Ellingham / Bob Morrison / Darkie Gates / Drunk / Ralph Anderson / Bill Flynn / Les Riley / Cemetery Gatekeeper / Luther Smith / Carpenter / Stan Ferris / Claude Finch / Tony Molloy / Nick Perry	TV series, 17 episodes
1967	Hunter	Wilson	TV series, Episode: "The Benedict File: Part 2"
1969–1970	Division 4	Pat Doolan / Roberts / Pete Rowe / Len Jones / Stan Foster / Friendly / Harry Lester / Eddie Copeland / George de C	TV series, 10 episodes
1971–1976	Matlock Police	Sgt. Bert Kennedy	TV series, 228 episodes
1976	Tandarra	Walter Drummund	TV series, Episode: "The Legacy of Walter Dummett"
1976	The Bluestone Boys	Governor Beams	TV series
1977	Bluey	Jake Hobbs	TV series, Episode: "A Touch of Stardust "
1977–1978	Young Ramsay	Jack Lambert	TV series, 12 episodes
1978–1979	Cop Shop	Mr. Bates / Cartwright / Albert Hartley / Godfrey	TV series, 6 episodes
1980-1981	The Sullivans	Mr Brookman / Henry Dumpleton	TV series, 3 episodes
1981	I Can Jump Puddles	Drunk	Miniseries, Episode: "Getting Your Breath"
1981	Holiday Island	Pat Donegan	TV series, Episode: "Rendezvous"
1983	All the Rivers Run	Examaning Skipper	TV series, 2 episodes
1984	Special Squad	Dr. John Perry	TV series, Episode: "Country Girl"
1980–1986	Prisoner	Judge Cawthorne / Doctor Kelley / Doctor Buscomb / Uncle Perc	TV series, 9 episodes
1989	Round the Twist	Old Man Chompers	TV series, Episode: "A Good Tip for Ghosts"
1989	Pugwall	Old Gus	3 episodes
1992	The Flying Doctors	Mr. Freeman	TV series, Episode: "The Accomplice"
1992	Good Vibrations	Old Joe	Miniseries
1995–2000	Blue Heelers	Mr Blyth / Harry Jinks / -Harry Quinn	TV series, 4 episodes
1999–2000	Neighbours	Funeral Celebrant / Jimmy LeVan	TV series, 2 episodes, (final appearance)
