= Billie Hammerberg =

Australian actress

- Born: Billie Lorraine Hammerberg; 24 March 1936
- Died: 8 February 1995 (aged 58); Melbourne, Victoria, Australia
- Occupation: Actress

Billie Lorraine Hammerberg (24 March 1936 – 8 February 1995) was an Australian actress, best known for roles on television and film.

== Biography ==
Hammerberg was an Australian actress best known for her role in the television series Prisoner in 1985 as May Collins. She had previously appeared in the series in a guest role in 1979, playing Valerie Richardson, a jewellery store owner, who is an ex-prisoner who shelters her escapee friend and former cellmate Bea Smith (played by Val Lehman) while she is on the run.

Other TV credits include: Homicide, Bluey, Cop Shop, Carson's Law, Special Squad and Round the Twist She also acted opposite Meryl Streep during a brief appearance in the film A Cry in the Dark.

Hammerberg died of unspecified cancer in Melbourne on 8 February 1995 at the age of 58. She was cremated at Springvale Botanical Cemetery on 13 February 1995.

== Filmography ==
=== Film ===
Year	Title	Role	Type
1977	Raw Deal	Madam	Feature film
1978	Noise Destroys		Short film
1988	A Cry in the Dark (aka Evil Angels)	Mrs Herron	Feature film

=== Television ===
Year	Title	Role	Type
1970	Callan	Replacement Secretary	TV series, 1 episode
1970	A Family at War	Frightened Woman	TV series, 1 episode
1975	Homicide	Babs / Margot Denning	TV series, 2 episodes
1976–77	Bluey	Stella Hedley / Alice Collins / Mrs Gruman	TV series, 3 episodes
1978–83	Cop Shop	Inspector Joy Stratton / Helen Jackson / Mrs Moore / Ethel Clarke / Mary Newburn / May Carter / Vera Williams / Iris Peterson	TV series, 57 episodes
1979, 1985	Prisoner	Valerie Richardson / May Collins	TV series, 57 episodes
1979–80	Skyways	Mama Fanelli / Mag Dyer / Audrey Ferguson	TV series, 4 episodes
1981	I Can Jump Puddles	Mrs Hale	TV miniseries, 1 episode
1992	Come Midnight Monday	Mrs Mary Hooliham	TV series, 6 episodes
1984	Carson's Law	Lydia O'Donnell	TV series, 1 episode
1984	Special Squad	Alice	TV series, 1 episode
1992	Round the Twist	Mrs Newman	TV series, 1 episode
