= Peter Curtin =

Australian actor (1944–2014)

- Born: Peter Julian Curtin; 31 January 1944
- Died: 19 May 2014 (aged 70)
- Occupation: Actor
- Years active: 1965–2014
- Spouse: Ailsa Piper (1987–18 May 2014; his death)

Peter Julian Curtin (31 January 1944 – 19 May 2014) was an Australian television and stage actor.

== Career ==
Curtin's career began when he joined the Melbourne Theatre Company, appearing in a 1973 production of The Plough and the Stars with Wendy Hughes.

Curtin appeared in a 1988 Melbourne Theatre Company production of A Streetcar Named Desire, playing the role of Mitch, alongside Helen Morse. He also performed in a 1990 Playbox Theatre production of Hotel Sorrento and a 1999 staging of The Sick Room. His final performance with Melbourne Theatre Company was a 2003 production of The Goat in which he reunited with Wendy Hughes.

Curtin's wife Ailsa Piper directed him in the play The Night Season for Red Stitch Actors Theatre in 2005.

Curtin's numerous television credits included MDA, White Collar Blue, All Saints, Blue Heelers, Something in the Air, The Games and SeaChange. Further television series he appeared in featured Ponderosa, BackBerner, Stingers, A Country Practice, Embassy, the television reboot of Mission: Impossible, The Bodysurfer, And Here Comes Bucknuckle, and Winner Takes All.

Curtin also appeared in several feature films including Blood Money (1980) and Till Human Voices Wake Us (2002).

== Personal life and death ==
Curtin met actress Ailsa Piper in 1986, and they were married a few months later, in 1987. In their wedding vows, they changed one vowel, promising to stay together “as long as we both shall love” (rather than 'live').

Curtin died, aged 70, on 19 May 2014.

== Filmography ==
=== Film ===
Year	Title	Role	Notes	Ref.
1980	Blood Money	Dan		
2002	Till Human Voices Wake Us	Dr Davis Franks		
2003	Darkness Falls	Dr. Travis		
2004	Tom White	Noel Cartwright		
2004	Anacondas: The Hunt for the Blood Orchid	Lawyer		

=== Television ===
Year	Title	Role	Notes	Ref.
1965	Homicide	Henry Cooper / Ray Gardiner	2 episodes	
1966	Antigone		TV play (episode of Wednesday Theatre)	
1976–1977	Bluey	Blair Thompson / Dave Brown	2 episodes	
1977–1981	The Sullivans	Warren Hunter / Detective	9 episodes	
1978–1983	Cop Shop	Chris Fuller / Sean Dorsey / Herbert Jolly / Neighbour	26 episodes	
1979	Ray Lawler Trilogy	Roo Webber	Miniseries, 3 episodes	
1979–1980	Skyways	David Kerridge / Roy Hamilton / Bob Marshall	3 episodes	
1980	The Last Outlaw	Constable Richards	Miniseries, 4 episodes	
1980–1986	Prisoner	Solicitor / Ian Mahoney / Detective Thorn	19 episodes	
1981	And Here Comes Bucknuckle	Achilles Jones	6 episodes	
1981	I Can Jump Puddles	Flogger	Miniseries, 1 episode	
1982	Winner Take All	Howard Nash	Miniseries, 10 episodes	
1983–1984	Carson's Law	Detective Sgt. Clem Harvey	8 episodes	
1984	Eureka Stockade	Attorney General	Miniseries, 1 episode	
1984	Special Squad	Thomas	1 episode	
1985	Zoo Family	Dr David 'Mitch' Mitchell	26 episodes	
1986	Handle with Care	Paul	TV movie	
1986	The Flying Doctors	Clive Hayes	1 episode	
1986	Whose Baby?	Noel Jenkins	Miniseries, 2 episodes	
1986	The Fast Lane	Lance	1 episode	
1988–1990	Mission: Impossible	Colonel Joseph Batz / Dr. Philip Westerly	2 episodes	
1989	Bodysurfer	Bernie	Miniseries, 2 episodes	
1989	Inside Running	Dermott O'Brien	19 episodes	
1990	Embassy	Green	1 episode	
1993	A Country Practice	Sandy Davis	2 episodes	
1993	Time Trax	Sheriff Dobbs	1 episode	
1993	Snowy	Older Michael	Miniseries, 13 episodes	
1994	Official Denial	Jonathon Applegate	TV movie	
1994–2004	Blue Heelers	Commander Reg Jones / Harrison Brealey / Warren Bradford / Inspector Len Murray / Dr Matthews	6 episodes	
1995	In Pursuit of Honor	Sgt. Ernest Gruber	TV movie	
1996	English: Have a Go	Professor Sayit	12 episodes	
1999; 2000	SeaChange	Port Deakin Mayor	2 episodes	
1999; 2003	Stingers	Doug Piper / Judge Frost	2 episodes	
2000	Virtual Nightmare	Andrew	TV movie	
2000	The Games	Mr. Cabsav ABC	1 episode	
2001	Something in the Air	Father Mitchell	2 episodes	
2002	Ponderosa		1 episode	
2002	All Saints	Karl Brown	1 episode	
2002	MDA	Bernard Bennett	1 episode	
2002	White Collar Blue	General Gerald Sinclair	1 episode	
2006	Nightmares & Dreamscapes: From the Stories of Stephen King	Mr Woolrich	1 episode	
2008	City Homicide	Leigh Carrington	1 episode	
2009–2010	Satisfaction	Dr. De Courcy	3 episodes	
2011	Judith Lucy's Spiritual Journey	Doctor (flashback)	1 episode	
2013	House Husbands	John	2 episodes	
2014	Party Tricks	Opposition Leader Neil Thorby	Miniseries, 1 episode	

== Theatre ==
Year	Title	Role	Notes	Ref.
1966	The Pageant of the Love Tree / The Happy Journey / The Farce of the Devil's Bridge / Elegant Edward		Russell St Theatre, Melbourne with UTRC	
1972	Flash Jim Vaux		Claremont Theatre Centre, Melbourne	
1973	Jumpers		Russell St Theatre, Melbourne with MTC	
1973	The Plough and the Stars	Jack Clitheroe	Russell St Theatre, Melbourne with MTC	
1973	Mother Courage		Princess Theatre, Melbourne with MTC	
1973	Batman's Beach-Head		Comedy Theatre, Melbourne with J. C. Williamson's & MTC	
1973	Design for Living		St Martins Theatre, Melbourne with MTC	
1973–1974	The Play's the Thing		St Martins Theatre, Melbourne, Russell St Theatre, Melbourne with MTC	
1973–1974	The Last of the Knucklemen		Russell St Theatre, Melbourne, Sydney Opera House, Playhouse, Canberra with MTC	
1974–1975	Equus		Russell St Theatre, Melbourne with MTC	
1974–1975	Coralie Lansdowne Says No		Russell St Theatre, Melbourne with MTC	
1975	The Double Dealer		Russell St Theatre, Melbourne with MTC	
1975	The Lady from the Sea		St Martins Theatre, Melbourne with MTC	
1975	The Revenger's Tragedy	Supervacuo	St Martins Theatre, Melbourne with MTC	
1975	Kennedy's Children		Playhouse, Adelaide, St Martins Theatre, Melbourne with MTC & SATC	
1975–1977	Kid Stakes	Roo Webber	Australian tour with MTC	
1976	Martello Towers		St Martins Theatre, Melbourne with MTC	
1976	Other Times	Roo Webber	Russell St Theatre, Melbourne with MTC	
1977	Summer of the Seventeenth Doll	Roo Webber	Russell St Theatre, Melbourne with MTC	
1977	The Doll Trilogy	Roo Webber	Russell St Theatre, Melbourne with MTC	
1977	Juno and the Paycock	Jerry Devine	Melbourne Athenaeum with MTC	
1977	The Wild Duck	First Guest	Melbourne Athenaeum with MTC	
1977	The Merchant of Venice	Bassanio	Melbourne Athenaeum with MTC	
1977	Pygmalion	Mrs Higgins' Butler	Melbourne Athenaeum with MTC	
1977	Desire Under the Elms	Simeon Cabot	Melbourne Athenaeum with MTC	
1978	Richard III	Chorus	Melbourne Athenaeum with MTC	
1978	The Beaux' Stratagem	Bagshot	Melbourne Athenaeum with MTC	
1978	Bodies	David	Russell St Theatre, Melbourne with MTC	
1980	Shakespeare the Sadist	Peter	Melbourne Athenaeum with MTC	
1980	Bremen Coffee	Miltenberger / Johann	Melbourne Athenaeum with MTC	
1980	A Doll's House	Nils Krogstad	Melbourne Athenaeum with MTC	
1980	The Matchmaker	Joe Scanlon / Rudolph	Melbourne Athenaeum with MTC	
1980	Privates on Parade	Sgt. Major Reg Drummond	Melbourne Athenaeum with MTC	
1981	Pete McGynty and the Dreamtime	Alec / Others	Melbourne Athenaeum with MTC	
1981	The Good Person of Setzuan	God	Melbourne Athenaeum with MTC	
1983	The Maid's Tragedy	The King	Melbourne Athenaeum with MTC	
1984	Candida		Russell St Theatre, Melbourne with MTC	
1984	Pack of Lies	Peter	Russell St Theatre, Melbourne with MTC	
1987	A Streetcar Named Desire	Mitch	Playhouse, Melbourne, Her Majesty's Theatre, Sydney with MTC	
1988	The Touch of Silk	Jim Davidson	Playhouse, Melbourne with MTC	
1989	Little Murders		Russell St Theatre, Melbourne with MTC	
1990–1991	Hotel Sorrento	Dick	Malthouse Theatre, Melbourne, Monash University, Melbourne, Wharf Theatre, Sydney with Playbox & STC	
1992	The Chronicle of Macbeth	Macbeth	Australia / Tokyo tour with Playbox	
1993	A Happy and Holy Occasion	Rev. Father Thurlogh O'Gorman	Malthouse Theatre, Melbourne, Theatre Royal, Hobart with Playbox	
1996	Summer of the Seventeenth Doll		Australian tour with MTC	
1997	For Better, for Worse		Chapel Off Chapel, Melbourne with Bay Street Productions	
1998	Sylvia		Australian tour with MTC	
1999	The Sick Room	Paul Alexander	Malthouse Theatre, Melbourne with Playbox	
2001	The Twilight Series	Ensemble	Collins St Baptist Church, Melbourne with Playbox	
2003	The Goat, or Who Is Sylvia?	Ross	Fairfax Studio, Melbourne with MTC	
2004	Julia 3	Leon	Malthouse Theatre, Melbourne with Playbox	
2005	The Night Season	Patrick Kennedy	Red Stitch Actors Theatre, Melbourne	
