= Alex Menglet =

Australian actor

- Born: Alexei Menglet; Moscow, USSR
- Education: Moscow State Institute of Drama (GETES)
- Occupation: Actor
- Notable work: Prisoner; Kick
- Children: 2

Alex Menglet, born Alexei Menglet in Moscow, USSR, is an actor who has found success working in Australia.

== Early life and family ==
Menglet was born in Moscow, USSR to famous parents Maya Menglet and Leonid Satanovskiy. He came from a theatrical family. His grandfather, Menglet Georgy, was a People's Artist of the USSR, his mother was a Honored Artist of the RSFSR and his father was an Honored Artist of the RSFSR and People's Artist of Russia. His maternal great grandmother, Bertha Ansovna Rusman (1889-1981) was a Latvian revolutionary, participated in the murder of a factory director in Riga in 1906 for handing over revolutionary workers to gendarmes. She was arrested and exiled to the Yenisey Governorate. A member of the CPSU with membership card #40.

As a child, he played the co-lead in television series The Old Fortress, feature film The Boys and Hurray for the Holidays. He then studied a four year course in acting and stage direction at Moscow State Institute of Drama (GETES), where he received his Diploma in 1977.

== Career ==
=== Film and television ===
Menglet is best known for his roles as chef Ray 'Gay Ray' Proctor in the 1984 season of Prisoner and as Zoran Baranoff in SBS series Kick in 2007.

Menglet's early television credits include several Crawford Productions series including Skyways, The Sullivans, Cop Shop and a six-week role in Carson's Law, playing the role of Lazlo Novack. In 1985, he appeared in miniseries Anzacs and The Dunera Boys. and played the lead role of Vladimir Petrov, a Soviet spy masquerading as a diplomat in Canberra in 1987 miniseries The Petrov Affair.

He went on to play the recurring role of Mr Hohenhaus in Halfway Across the Galaxy and Turn Left in 1994, and Mihaly Bassa in 1995 miniseries Bordertown the following year. He then appeared as Alexei in High Flyers in 1999 and Davorin in Eugénie Sandler P.I. in 2000.

He had numerous guest roles in Wilfred II, City Homicide, Kath & Kim, Shock Jock, Janus, Phoenix. SeaChange and appeared in 1995 series Bordertown.

Menglet appeared in 2009 UKTV miniseries False Witness and played Vlad in House Rules. From 2014 to 2015, he starred as Joan Ferguson's father and fencing instructor, Ivan Ferguson in prison drama Wentworth.

Menglet's early film credits include The Clinic (1982), Sky Pirates (1986), Holidays on the River Yarra, A Woman’s Tale (both 1991) and Garbo (1992). He also appeared in the feature films Children of the Revolution (1996), He Died with a Falafel in his Hand (2001), Josh Jarman (2004), The Book of Revelation (2006), Salvation (2008) and Any Questions for Ben? (2012). In 2021, Menglet played the role of Yaroslav in the film Ascendant.

=== Stage ===
Menglet has appeared in numerous theatre productions throughout his career. He was a member of the Anthill Theatre ensemble in Melbourne in the 1980s, alongside fellow Eastern European migrant, Jacek Koman. There, he performed in productions of The Cherry Orchard, Uncle Vanya, The Imaginary Invalid, Three Sisters, The Crimson Island, The School for Wives, Mother Courage and Her Children and The Immigrants.

He went on to perform in Melbourne Theatre Company productions such as The Visit alongside Zoe Caldwell and Cyrano de Bergerac opposite David Wenham. He reunited with Koman, starring together in a production of Waiting for Godot. Other MTC credits include Rock 'n' Roll, The Madwoman of Chaillot, Cyrano de Bergerac, Julius Caesar, The Woman in the Window, When She Danced, The Selection, The Marriage of Figaro and The Taming of the Shrew. He also translated Chekhov's The Seagull for MTC in 2001.

Additionally, Menglet has performed in Goodbye Vaudeville Charlie Mudd for Malthouse Theatre, Don Juan and Miss Julie for Sydney Theatre Company, The Seagull and Picasso at the Lapin Agile for Belvoir. Other theatre credits include The Forest for Queensland Theatre Company, The Abduction from the Seraglio for Victoria State Opera and If Winter Comes for Church Theatre. He also starred in a revival of Twelve Angry Men, winning a 2005 Green Room Award for his performance.

Menglet has also directed for the stage including productions of Crime and Punishment and The Red and The Black for the Stork Theatre, and Rites of Passage, Yellow Moon, Jack Goes Boating and a 2005 production of Playing the Victim for Red Stitch Actors Theatre, starring Jim Daly and Angus Sampson.

Menglet has also worked for ABC Radio drama and the Russian Language Program on SBS Radio, and as a director and translator.

== Personal life ==
At the age of 18, Menglet married his first wife, a school teacher. They separated ten months later, before getting divorced.

While studying drama in Moscow, met and then married Elsbeth, a West German exchange student, before moving to Germany in 1978, at the age of 22. A friend from Moscow had moved to Melbourne, where he was photographer on some Australian films, influencing Menglet (who wanted to move to an English-speaking country) to move there with his wife in 1981. Together, they had two daughters Renisia and Katerina.

Menglet also has a brother, Dmitri.

== Filmography ==
=== Film ===
Year	Title	Role	Notes	Ref
1972	Malchiki	Goshka Vyezemskiy	Feature film	
1972	Ura! U nas kanikuly!		Feature film	
1982	The Clinic		Feature film	
1984	Matthew and Son	Gebhard	TV film	
1985	Wills & Burke	William Brahe	Feature film	
1986	Man and Boy	Relievimg Manager	Short film	
1986	Sky Pirates	Sullivan	Feature film	
1986	The More Things Change...	Telecom Man	Feature film	
1986	The Still Point	Paul	Feature film	
1988	Georgia	Lazlo	Feature film	
1988	The Rainbow Warrior Conspiracy	Velche	TV film	
1989	Celia	Mr Goldman	Feature film	
1991	Against the Innocent	Karl Heinmann	Feature film	
1991	A Woman's Tale	Con 2	Feature film	
1991	Holidays on the River Yarra	Big Mac	Feature film	
1992	Garbo	Czech Agent	Feature film	
1993	The Feds	Dr Steven Jellicie	TV film	
1996	Zone 39	Tito	Feature film	
1996	Children of the Revolution	Yuri Nikoloyev	Feature film	
2001	He Died with a Felafel in His Hand	Taylor	Feature film	
2003	The Long Lunch	Issur Demsky	Feature film	
2004	One Perfect Day	Bernard May	Feature film	
2004	Josh Jarman	Sebastian	Feature film	
2008	Salvation	Anton	Feature film	
2010	The Wedding Party	Mikhail	Feature film	
2011	The Crimson Room		Short film	
2012	Any Questions for Ben?	Katerina‘s Dad	Feature film	
2014	The Mule	Victor	Feature film	
2014	Rabbit	Leonard	Short film	
2016	Milk of Kindness	Director Merrett	Short film	
2021	Ascendant	Yaroslav	Feature film	
2022	Petrol	Vladimir	Feature film	

=== Television ===
Year	Title	Role	Type
1972	Byloe i dumy	Nik	
1979	Skyways	Mikhail Gosenko	1 episode
1981	Holiday Island	Niko	2 episodes
1983	The Sullivans	Nikolai	2 episodes
1983	Carson's Law	Laszlo Novak	10 episodes
1984	Special Squad	Yuri	Episode 26: "Farewell to a Comrade"
1984–1985	Prisoner	Ray 'Gay Ray' Proctor	14 episodes
1985	The Fast Lane	Harwood	1 episode
1985	A Thousand Skies	Antony Fokker	Miniseries, 1 episode
1985	Anzacs	Hans	Miniseries, 1 episode
1985	The Dunera Boys	Roth	Miniseries, 2 episodes
1987	The Petrov Affair	Vladimir Petrov	Miniseries, 2 episodes
1988	Always Afternoon	Hans Weissmuller	Miniseries, 3 episodes
1989	Mission: Impossible	Lieutenant Udo	1 episode
1992	Phoenix	Ivan Kastelanic	1 episode
1994	Halfway Across the Galaxy and Turn Left	Mr Hohenhaus	8 episodes
1994	The Damnation of Harvey McHugh	Sasha	Miniseries, 1 episode
1995	Janus	Dr Rogers	1 episode
1995	Bordertown	Mihaly Bassa	Miniseries, 10 episodes
1997	State Coroner	Jim Vandenburg	1 episode
1998	The Genie from Down Under 2	Grigor	1 episode
1999	SeaChange	Krzysztof	1 episode
1999	High Flyers	Alexei	26 episodes
2000	Eugénie Sandler P.I.	Davorin	11 episodes
2001	Shock Jock	Dieter Kohl	1 episode
2003	Stingers	Ben Schulman	1 episode
2004	Kath and Kim	Photographer	1 episode
2007	Kick	Zoran Baranoff	13 episodes
2008	City Homicide	Walter Pankor	1 episode
2009	False Witness	Dimitri	Miniseries
2010	Wilfred	Orpheous	1 episode
2011	Killing Time	Uri	Miniseries, 2 episodes
2012	Rake	Gerard	1 episode
2014–2015	Wentworth	Ivan Ferguson / Fencing Master	
2016	Hunters	Havi	1 episode
2021	Wakefield	Petrov	Miniseries, 2 episodes
2021	Jack Irish	The Banker	2 episodes

== Theatre ==
=== As actor ===
Year	Title	Role	Notes	Ref.
1970s	Lady Macbeth of Mtsensk	Sergei	Majakowski Theatre Academy, Moscow	
1970s	Ivanov	Ivanov	Majakowski Theatre Academy, Moscow	
1970s	Half to the Moon		Majakowski Theatre Academy, Moscow	
1970s	Crime and Punishment		Moscow Theatre Academy of Mossoviet	
1970s	The Little Prince		Moscow Theatre Academy of Mossoviet	
1986	If Winter Comes	Ozwath	Church Theatre, Melbourne with Australian Contemporary Theatre Company	
1987	The Cherry Orchard	Pishik	Anthill Theatre, Melbourne	
1987	Uncle Vanya	Serebryakov	Anthill Theatre, Melbourne	
1987	The Three Sisters	Andrei		
1989	The Abduction from the Seraglio	Pasha Selim	State Theatre, Melbourne with Victoria State Opera	
1989–1990	The Imaginary Invalid	Argan	New Fortune Theatre, Perth, Anthill Theatre, Melbourne, Universal Theatre, Melbourne, Armoury Lawns, Adelaide	
1990	The Emigrants		Anthill Theatre, Melbourne	
1990	Waiting for Godot	Vladimir	Russell St Theatre, Melbourne, with MTC	
1991	The Taming of the Shrew	Grumio	Playhouse, Melbourne with MTC	
1991	The Marriage of Figaro	Count Almaviva	Playhouse, Melbourne with MTC	
1991	On Our Selection	Villam Brandt	Playhouse, Melbourne with MTC	
1992	The Crimson Island	Gennadi Panfilovich / Edward Glenarvan	Royalty Theatre, Adelaide Anthill Theatre, Melbourne	
1992	Miss Julie	Jean	Wharf Theatre with STC	
1992	When She Danced	Sergei Esenin	Russell St Theatre, Melbourne, with MTC	
1992	The School for Wives	Chrysalde	Gasworks Theatre, Melbourne with Anthill Theatre Company	
1993	Mother Courage and Her Children		Gasworks Theatre, Melbourne with Anthill Theatre Company	
1993	The Force of Habit		Gasworks Theatre, Melbourne with Anthill Theatre Company	
1994	The Gift of the Gorgon	Damsinski	Russell St Theatre, Melbourne, with MTC	
1994; 1997	Picasso at the Lapin Agile	Sagot	Malthouse Theatre, Melbourne, Belvoir Street Theatre, Sydney, Melbourne Athenaeum with Playbox Theatre Company	
1995	The Head of Mary	Dr Sakamoto / Man IV	Tokyo International Festival, Malthouse Theatre, Melbourne, with Playbox Theatre Company	
1996	The Tragedy of Julius Caesar		Playhouse, Melbourne with MTC	
1998	The Woman in the Window	Auditor / Korzh	Fairfax Studio, Melbourne with MTC	
1998	Tear from a Glass Eye	Mr Petra	Malthouse Theatre with Playbox Theatre Company	
1999	Waiting for Godot		MTC	
2001	The Forest	Ivan Petrovich Vosmibratov	Playhouse, Brisbane with QTC	
2001	The Seagull	Shamraev	Playhouse, Melbourne with MTC	
2001	Don Juan	Sganarelle	Sydney Opera House with STC	
2002	Laughter on the 23rd Floor	Val	Playhouse, Melbourne, with MTC	
2003	The Visit	Policeman	Playhouse, Melbourne, with MTC	
2004	Twelve Angry Men	Juror 11	Playhouse, Brisbane, Sydney Theatre, Melbourne Athenaeum with Arts Project Australia	
2005	Cyrano de Bergerac	Ragueneau	Playhouse, Melbourne, with MTC	
2005	Ivanov	Ivanov	Fortyfivedownstairs, Melbourne	
2006	Ray's Tempest	Boris	Fairfax Studio, Melbourne, with MTC	
2006	Festen	Helmut	Fairfax Studio, Melbourne, with MTC	
2007	The Madwoman of Chaillot	The Sergeant	Playhouse, Melbourne, with MTC	
2008	Rock ‘n’ Roll	Milan / Policeman 2	Playhouse, Melbourne, Sydney Theatre with MTC	
2008	The Lower Depths	Angel	Fortyfivedownstairs, Melbourne	
2009	Goodbye Vaudeville Charlie Mudd	Allarkini	Malthouse Theatre, Melbourne, with Playbox Theatre Company	
2010	Harbinger	John	Space Theatre, Adelaide with Brink Productions	
2011	Julius Caesar	Caesar	Australian national tour with STC	
2012	Yes, Prime Minister	The Kumranistan Ambassador	Comedy Theatre, Melbourne, Canberra Theatre, Sydney Theatre, Gold Coast Arts Centre, Her Majesty's Theatre, Adelaide, His Majesty's Theatre, Perth, Playhouse, Brisbane	
2012	The Curtain		Southbank Theatre, Melbourne, with MTC	
2013	True Minds	Gruff Grayson	Southbank Theatre, Melbourne, with MTC	
2014	Eurydice	Father	Red Stitch Actors Theatre	
2015	Mother Courage and Her Children	The General & others	Belvoir Street, Sydney	
2018	Bottomless	Alan, Boxey & Jimmy	Fortyfivedownstairs, Melbourne	

=== As director / translator ===
Year	Title	Role	Notes	Ref.
1970s	The Little Prince	Director	Moscow Theatre Academy of Mossoviet	
1999	The Little Cherry Orchard	Translator	Belvoir Street Theatre, Sydney	
2001	The Seagull	Translator	Playhouse, Melbourne with MTC	
2005	Playing the Victim	Director	Red Stitch Actors Theatre, Melbourne	
2007	Jack Goes Boating	Director	Red Stitch Actors Theatre, Melbourne	
2007	The Spook	Dialect consultant	Malthouse Theatre, Melbourne	
2009	The Rites of Evil	Director / Designer	Red Stitch Actors Theatre, Melbourne, with Melbourne Fringe Festival	
2009	Yellow Moon	Director	Red Stitch Actors Theatre, Melbourne	
2010	Uncle Vanya	Translator	Sydney Theatre with Bell Shakespeare	
2017; 2019	Tchekov at the House of Special Purpose	Director	La Mama Courthouse, Melbourne	
2021; 2022	Interculturality... Chekhov: Masha in Translation	Director	Monash University, Melbourne, Theatre Works, Melbourne	

== Awards and nominations ==
Year	Work	Award	Category	Result	Ref.
2005	Twelve Angry Men	Green Room Awards	Best Supporting Actor	Won	
2012	Julius Caesar	Helpmann Awards	Best Male Actor in a Supporting Role in a Play	Nominated	
