= Terry Gill =

Australian actor (1939–2015)

- Born: 25 October 1939; England
- Died: 25 February 2015 (aged 75); Richmond, Victoria, Australia
- Occupations: Actor; producer; director; writer; theatre owner
- Years active: 1967–2011
- Spouse: Carole Ann Gill (m. 1962; died 2015)
- Children: 2

Terry Gill (25 October 1939 – 25 February 2015) was an English Australian actor, theatre owner, producer, director and writer. A character actor, he carved a niche in Australian television playing police officers. He appeared in over 26 Australian television productions either as a regular or in guest roles. He was often associated with Crawford Productions and Reg Grundy Organisation.

== Early life ==
Gill was born on 25 October 1939 in England, Gill never knew his father. He immigrated to Australia with his actress wife Carole Ann Gill.

== Career ==
Gill was a recurring cast member in the women's prison drama Prisoner as Det. Insp. Jack Grace, a regular cast member as Sgt. Jack Carruthers in The Flying Doctors and played another recurring role in Blue Heelers as Superintendent Clive Adamson. He appeared in a guest role on Neighbours.

Gill appeared in Crocodile Dundee as the leader of a group of kangaroo shooters whom Dundee (Paul Hogan) fights in the Walkabout Creek Hotel bar, and later uses a dead kangaroo as a cover to shoot at the shooters and scare them. He portrayed Santa Claus on Australian TV's annual Carols by Candlelight for 27 years (in later years alongside well-known children's entertainers Hi-5 and Australian TV icon Humphrey B. Bear).

For many years, Gill and his wife Carol Ann ran The Tivoli theatre restaurant in Melbourne, producing pantomimes and theatre shows featuring many well-known Australian performers.

== Personal life ==
He suffered a mild stroke in late 2014. After suffering from lung cancer, he died in the inner Melbourne suburb of Richmond on 25 February 2015.

Gill was married to Carole Ann Gill (née Aylett) for 52 years until his death. They had two children.

== Filmography ==
=== Film ===
Year	Title	Role	Notes
1974	Alvin Rides Again	Male Barracker	Feature film
1976	End Play	Ticket Collector (uncredited)	Feature film
1976	Mad Dog Morgan		Feature film
1977	High Rolling	Nightclub Waiter	Feature film
1979	Gail	Dad	TV movie
1979	Taxi	Dawson	TV movie
1980	The Black Planet	Constable Lonigan (voice)	TV movie
1983	Phar Lap	Mechanic	Feature film
1984	The Phantom Treehouse	Voice	Animated TV movie
1986	Jenny Kissed Me	Des Ormonde	Feature film
1986	Crocodile Dundee	Duffy	Feature film
1986	Man and Boy	Peter	Short film
1987	With Love to the Person Next to Me	Punter in black / Security guard	Feature film
1988	The Wind in the Willows	Ratty (voice, uncredited)	TV movie
1990	Police Crop: The Winchester Conspiracy	Detective Sergeant Bill Cullen	TV movie
1990	Escape from Madness	Hank Stardust	Feature film
1997	One Way Ticket	Birdie	TV movie
1998	Crackers	Jack Hall	Feature film
1999	Harry's War	Publican	TV movie
2003	The Wannabes (aka Criminal Ways)	Barney the Bear	Feature film
2011	Frank & Jerry	Farmer	Feature film
2015	Charlie	Old Man	Short film

=== Television ===
Year	Title	Role	Notes
1966	Australian Playhouse		TV series, 1 episode
1966-75	Homicide	Various roles	TV series, 21 episodes
1967	Hunter	Dempster	TV series, 1 episode
1969-75	Division 4	Bennett / Dusty Edwards / Various	TV series, 16 episodes
1970	The Long Arm		TV series, 1 episode
1971-74	Matlock Police	Various roles	TV series, 7 episodes
1973	Ryan	Jim / Chester / Sam	TV series, 3 episodes
1974	Marion	Bert	Miniseries, 1 episode
1974	Alpha Scorpio	McIntyre	TV series, 5 episodes
1974	And the Big Men Fly	Peter Williams	TV series, 6 episodes
1975	Cash and Company	Higgins	TV miniseries, 1 episode
1976	Power Without Glory	Constable Grieve	TV miniseries, 2 episodes
1976	Solo One	Bill Duncan	TV series, 1 episode
1976-77	Bellbird	Reg	TV series, 5 episodes
1976-77	Bluey	Detective Sergeant Reg Truscott	TV series, 21 episodes
1977-81	Cop Shop	Various	TV series, 13 episodes
1978	Against the Wind	Redcoat Sergeant	TV miniseries, 4 episodes
1979	Skyways	Ed Sloane / Keith Shelton	TV series, 2 episodes
1979-86	Prisoner	Detective Inspector Jack Grace	TV series, 54 episodes
1980	Young Ramsay	Fred	TV series, 1 episode
1980	The Sullivans	Ted	TV series, 1 episode
1980	Water Under the Bridge	Rex	TV miniseries, 1 episode
1980	The Last Outlaw	Constable Lonigan	TV miniseries, 4 episodes
1981	I Can Jump Puddles	Arthur	TV miniseries, 3 episodes
1982	Come Midnight Monday	Don Arblaster	TV series, 6 episodes
1982	Sons and Daughters	Mr. Henderson	TV series, 1 episode
1984	Special Squad		TV series, 1 episode
1984	The Keepers		TV series, 2 episodes
1984	Carson's Law	Perry	TV series, 1 episode
1985	The Fast Lane	Mayor	TV series, 1 episode
1985	The Henderson Kids	Mr Clarke	TV series, 9 episodes
1985 / 1996	Neighbours	Mr McClean / Sergeant Herron	TV series, 4 episodes
1986	Whose Baby?	Alan	Miniseries, 1 episode
1986-1992	The Flying Doctors	Sergeant Jack Carruthers	TV series, 106 episodes
1989	Mission: Impossible	Patterson	TV series, 1 episode
1990	Col'n Carpenter	Graham	TV series, 1 episode
1991	Ratbag Hero	Skipper	TV miniseries
1991-92	Boys from the Bush	Jacko	TV series, 2 episodes
1992	Good Vibrations	Fred	TV miniseries, 2 episodes
1993	Minder	Collins	TV series, 1 episode
1993	The Late Show	Charlie the Wonder Dog	TV series, 1 episode
1993	G.P.	Frank Miller	TV series, 1 episode
1994	Time Trax	Detective Robertson	TV series, 1 episode
1994	A Country Practice	Lachie Morrison	TV series, 1 episode
1994	Snowy River: The McGregor Saga	Mayor	TV series, 2 episodes
1994	Wedlocked	Ainslie Barton	TV series, 4 episodes
1995-2001	Blue Heelers	Superintendent Clive Adamson	TV series, 5 episodes
1999 / 2003	Stingers	Barry Bender	TV series, 2 episodes
2000	Something in the Air	Jeff Cassidy	TV series, 8 episodes
2010	Bed of Roses	Owen Diston	TV series, 1 episode
2013	It's a Date	Stan	TV series, 1 episode
	Carols by Candlelight	Santa Claus	Annual TV special

=== Video games ===
Year	Title	Role	Notes
2002	Ty the Tasmanian Tiger	Maurie the Sulphur Crested Cockatoo	Video game
2004	Ty the Tasmanian Tiger 2: Bush Rescue	Maurie the Sulphur Crested Cockatoo	Video game
2005	Ty the Tasmanian Tiger 3: Night of the Quinkan	Maurie the Sulphur Crested Cockatoo	Video game
