= Maureen Edwards =

New Zealand actress (born 1944)

- Born: Maureen Elizabeth Edwards; 17 April 1944 (age 82); New Zealand
- Occupation: Actress
- Years active: c. 1960-2011, 2019
- Known for: A Country Practice (TV series) as Matron Rosemary Prior; Shortland Street (TV series) as Dr. Patricia Hewitt
- Notable work: Prisoner (TV series) various roles including Officer Sue Bailey; Neighbours (TV series) as Marcia Taylor/Ruby Dwyer/Hilda Jones/Jill Smith

Maureen Elizabeth Edwards (born 17 April 1944) is a New Zealand-born retired actress, notable for her small screen roles both in her home country and in Australia.

Aș a surporting player she first became best known internationally for playing four different recurring roles in cult series Prisoner (known also as Prisoner: Cell Block H)

She is best known, however, for her role in A Country Practice as hospital matron Rosemary Prior, whom married Dr. Terence Elliot in the final episode and also in the New Zealand serial Shortland Street as Dr. Hewitt.

She later appeared in several roles in Neighbours

== Early life and theatre ==
Born as Maureen Elizabeth Edwards, in New Zealand. She initially trained to become a teacher, before becoming interested in theatre.

Edwards was a featured actress at the Globe theatre in Dunedin, New Zealand, in the 1960s, and became an administrator for the Gateway Players Theatre Company.

== Television roles ==
Edwards emigrated to Australia with her husband Peter Tulloch in 1977 and as a character actress became best known locally and internationally for her roles in the cult drama television series Prisoner, having portrayed four different characters in the series in cameos, notably Officer Sue Bailey.

She remains best known however for her longer term roles in Australian television soap operas, particularly in the series A Country Practice as Matron Rosemary Prior from 1991 until 1993 (after two cameo roles in 1985 and 1990). She replaced hospital DN Ann Brennan (played by Mary Regan) and arrives from Africa to take over running the local hospital. In the series' final episode, Rosemary marries Dr. Terence Elliot (played by Shane Porteous).

In Neighbours, Edwards played Ruby Dwyer in 2002 and 2003. She had appeared previously in Neighbours as Marcia Taylor in 1985, and later had 2 more roles in the series as Hilda Jones and Jill Smith in 2008 and 2009 respectively.

She appeared in the New Zealand soap opera Shortland Street from 2001 to 2002 as CEO Dr. Patricia Hewitt.

Edwards has also featured in many Australia miniseries and telemovies such as All the Rivers Run and Evil Angels

Other television roles included the series Cop Shop, Skyways, I Can Jump Puddles, The Flying Doctors, G.P., Blue Heelers and The Secret Life of Us.

== Filmography ==
=== Film ===
Year	Production	Role	Type
1980	Stage Fright (aka Nightmares)	Mother	Feature film
1984	High Country		TV movie
1986	Jenny Kissed Me	Magistrate	Feature film
1986	The Anniversary	Cynthia Hamilton	TV movie
1987	To Market to Market	Valerie	Feature film
1988	Evil Angels (aka A Cry in the Dark)	Kate Woodman	Feature film
1988	The Bit Part	Bev Howard	Feature film
1998	Two Girls and a Baby	Liz's Mum	Short film
2001	The Bank	Supreme Court Judge	Feature film
2011	Shoelace	Older Mum	Short film

=== Television ===
Year	Production	Role	Type
1978	Cop Shop	Barbara Wallace	TV series
1979	Skyways	Imogan Swift	TV series
1980	Lawson's Mates		TV series
1981	I Can Jump Puddles	Mrs. Carmichael	TV miniseries
1983	All the Rivers Run	Aunt Agnes	TV miniseries
1984	Special Squad		TV series
1985	The Flying Doctors	Rosemary Daniels	TV series
1986	The Lancaster Miller Affair	Alice Burgess	TV miniseries
1979-86	Prisoner (aka Prisoner: Cell Block H)	Gracie / Hazel Crowe / Prison Officer Sue Bailey / Newscaster	TV series, 4 roles
1988	The Bartons	Miss India	TV series
1988	The Far Country	Mrs. Morton	TV miniseries
1988	Home and Away	Liz Collins	TV series
1989	Pugwall	Sister Griskett	TV series
1989	Bonza	Mother	
1990	The Flying Doctors	Pauline Grant	TV series
1992, 2001-02	Shortland Street	Dr. Patricia Hewitt	TV series
1983, 1990	A Country Practice	Yvonne McLean / Katherine Di Angelo	TV series, episode "Little Voices" parts 1 and 2, "Out of Africa" parts 1 and 2
1990-93	A Country Practice	Matron Rosemary Prior	TV series
	Blue Heelers		TV series
1994	G.P.	Annie Fisher	TV series
1997	The Ripper	Matron	
2003	The Secret Life of Us	Tribunal Woman	TV series
2009	Carla Cametti PD	Ruth Fenley	TV miniseries
1985, 2008, 2009	Neighbours	Marcia Taylor / Hilda Smith / Jill Jones	TV series
2002-03	Neighbours	Ruby Dwyer	TV series
2019	Five Bedrooms	Joyce	TV series
