= Lucky Grills =

Australian actor and comedian (1928–2007)

Lucky Grills OAM
- Born: Leo Dennis Grills; 26 May 1928; Moonah, Tasmania, Australia
- Died: 27 July 2007 (aged 79); Queensland, Australia
- Occupations: Actor, comedian
- Years active: 1954–2007
- Known for: Bluey (1976–1977) as Detective Sergeant ‘Bluey’ Grills

Leo Dennis Grills OAM (26 May 1928 – 27 July 2007), known professionally as Lucky Grills, was an Australian actor and comedian. His best known acting role was in the crime drama TV series Bluey playing the title role, and later parodied in Bargearse. Grills took his professionally working name after the Italian-American gangster Lucky Luciano.

Grills is credited for initiating the Mo Awards, an awards show that celebrate Australian Variety in 1975.

== Early life ==
Grills was born on Johnson Street in Moonah, a suburb of Hobart, Tasmania, on 26 May 1928, to Francis Leonard Grills and Hilda May (née Dennis). He was the youngest of five siblings, who were Thelda Jean, Raymond Ernest, Eunice and Faye Grills.

He was born into the depression, at a time when there was little work available and money was tight. He was raised on a farm until his family relocated to Melbourne, hoping for better prospects. Grills left school at 14 years and took a printing apprenticeship.

== Career ==
Grills first foray into of entertainment came as part of the musical comedy duo 'Tex and Lucky’, performing around Melbourne at parties, clubs and the Hawthorn Town Hall, before he successfully auditioned for the 1948 Revue with the Tivoli Theatre, Melbourne. He later moved with the show to the New Tivoli Theatre, Sydney. He also worked as a stand-up comic in the Sydney clubs, sometimes playing the trumpet and drums. He would change his material to suit his audience, stating: "Some people know me as the dirtiest comic in the business... but others know me as a man who never drops even a mild four-letter word."

In 1957, Grills, together with musician Geoff Mack started a variety show at the Hotel Coolangatta on the Gold Coast, eventually touring the show nationally, under the name ‘Carols Varieties’ for six years.

On one occasion in Adelaide, Grills had done a show and needed to get a taxi. He had put on a big houndstooth-checked sports jacket and was carrying a suitcase. The taxi driver looked at him and asked where he had been wrestling. Lucky had to set him straight and let him know he was not a wrestler but a comic. For the rest of the journey, Grills had to listen to the driver telling old jokes.

During both the Korean and Vietnam wars, Grills travelled over to entertain Australian troops stationed there. He also did three hundred weeks in a migrant education programme called You Say the Word, where he played the owner of a factory. "It was designed to show newcomers to Australia how things were done and to teach them English", he explained.

Prior to his role in Bluey, Grills played other parts in several Crawford series, but "oddly enough, despite my bulk and appearance, never once have I been asked to play a heavy". It was a guest role in Matlock Police that brought him to the attention of producers for the role his best known role of 'Bluey' Hills in the television series Bluey in 1976. He was sent a script page, read it and duly went to the audition. Within ten days he knew he had the part.

Grills' other notable credits include the biopic Caddie (1976) with Jack Thompson and Jacki Weaver, crime action drama film Money Movers (1978) and comedy drama musical Starstruck (1982). He also starred in children's film Molly (1983) alongside Claudia Karvan and long running TV soap opera Home and Away (1988). He played minor roles in A Country Practice, 1987 war miniseries Vietnam alongside Nicole Kidman and the film Fast Talking with Steve Bisley.

Grills was reintroduced to a younger generation in a recurring segment of the early 1990s comedy series The Late Show called Bargearse, a humorous re-dub of Bluey. He also made three in-person appearances on the show, including singing as a member of a Crosby, Stills, Nash & Young parody band and in character as Bluey protesting the last episode of Bargearse.

Following his film and television career, Grills toured with Stan Zemanek’s travelling cabaret show in the 1990s, often joined by singer and comedian Jan Adele. He is often credited as being the last touring vaudeville performer in Australia and frequently performed two shows a night, seven days a week throughout Australia and internationally.

Grills released his autobiography "Just Call Me Lucky" in 2003.

== Honours ==
Grills was awarded the Australian Centenary Medal in the 2000 Queen's New Year's Honours List for his services to the entertainment industry and the arts. He was also awarded the Medal of the Order of Australia (OAM) in the 2001 Queen's Birthday Honours List for his services to the entertainment industry through charitable organisations.

== Personal life ==
Grills was married three times. His first wife Beryl did not enjoy show business or travel, but they parted on amicable terms. His second marriage was to a dancer, Karen Sanders, with whom he performed in a duo as ‘Lucky and Sunny’ in Britain and South Africa for several years. They had 2 children Adam and Shanra. He was happily married to third wife Maria until his death.

Grills was a Freemason. He was initiated into the three degrees of Freemasonry on 22 April, 24 June and 26 August respectively, in Lodge Thespian No. 256 UGL of New South Wales and Australian Capital Territory.

== Death ==
On 28 July, 2007, at the age of 79, Grills died in his sleep at his home on the Gold Coast in Queensland. On the day prior to his death he was still working and had made two public appearances back to back. A celebration of his life was held at Mermaid Waters. His cremated remains were later interred with his parents at Cheltenham Memorial Cemetery in Melbourne on 19 December 2007. 'Make em Laugh’ is engraved on his memorial plaque.

== Filmography ==
=== Film ===
Year	Title	Role	Notes
1976	Caddie	Pawnbroker	
1978	Money Movers	Robert Conway	
1982	Starstruck	Brewery Truckdriver	
1983	Molly	Dogcatcher	
1984	Fast Talking	Detective Holloway	
2010	Unearthed	Station Master	

=== Television ===
Year	Title	Role	Notes
1968	The Battlers		
1971	The Incredible Christmas Day Theft		TV movie
1976	Matlock Police	Manny Martin	1 episode
1976–1977	Bluey	Detective Sergeant ‘Bluey’ Grills	39 episodes
1978	Glenview High	Bert	1 episode
1978	Chopper Squad	Sergeant Burrows	1 episode
1978	Bobby Dazzler	Himself	1 episode
1980	People Like Us	Bert Stanley	TV movie
1981	Holiday Island	Frederico	1 episode
1983	The Dismissal	George Harris, President of Carlton Football Club	Miniseries, 1 episode
1984	A Country Practice	Johnno	12 episodes
1984	Special Squad	Earwig	Episode 36: "Return of the Cat"
1987	Vietnam	Senator Shane Paltridge	Miniseries, 2 episodes
1987	Outback Vampires	Humphrey	TV movie
1990	Rafferty's Rules	Darryl Hayes	1 episode
1991	The Last Crop	Mr Phil Collins	TV movie
1991	Home and Away	Foreman	2 episodes
1993	The Late Show	Himself	Segment: Bargearse, 2 episodes
1995	Bordertown	Wishart	Miniseries, 1 episode
1996	Fire	Detective Sergeant Olsen	1 episode
2000	The Magicians	Fat Man	TV movie
2000	Flipper	Mayor Clinton Beames	1 episode
2006	Mortified	Cliff	1 episode

== Stage ==
Year	Title	Role	Notes
1954	Sorlie's Travelling Revue and Variety Company	Comedian	Near the Civic Centre, Canberra
1957	Jack and Jill		Princess Theatre, Melbourne
1957	Cinderella		Tivoli Theatre, Melbourne
1957–1962	Carols Varieties		Hotel Coolangatta & Australian national tour
1970	All-New, Non-Stop Minstrel Scandals		Empire Theatre with African Consolidated Theatres
1978	Cop This for a Laugh	Comedian	Keatons Restaurant and Theatre, Newcastle (also producer and writer)
1979; 1981	Fun Follies		Palais Royale, Newcastle, NSW tour
1980	Lucky Grills	Comedian	St George Leagues Club, Sydney
2003	All That Glitters	Comedian	Gold Coast Arts Centre
2003	Jokin' Your Jocks Off	Comedian	The Village Theatre, Sanctuary Cove
2005	Robin Hood and His Merry Men		Gold Coast Little Theatre with Top Hat Productions
