= Black Planet =

Black Planet may refer to:

- BlackPlanet, a social networking website geared towards African-Americans
- Black Planet, a song by The Sisters of Mercy
- a Carbon planet, a proposed planetary type that is actually black.
- A band that is mentioned in Hunter X Hunter.
- The Black Planet, science fiction film
