= Bartholomew John =

New Zealand actor

- Born: John Suckling; 24 August 1952 (age 74); Christchurch, New Zealand
- Notable work: Chris Piper in The Young Doctors; Captain Nick Granger in Skyways

Comedy career
- Years active: 1974–
- Medium: Actor, singer

Bartholomew John (born 24 August 1952 in Christchurch, New Zealand) is an actor best known for his roles on television in America and Australia. In 1974, his single "Someone" peaked at number 75 in Australia.

== Career ==
John has worked as a professional stage and screen actor, singer and presenter for over 40 years, nationally and internationally. He is a classically trained singer, who initially had a music career in New Zealand. He never considered himself an actor, but developed the acting bug through musical theatre.

In the 1970s, John played clown, Ronald McDonald on McDonald’s television advertisements in Australia.

He played Dr. Chris Piper in the Australian soap opera The Young Doctors from 1977 to 1979 followed by a lead role in Skyways from 1979 to 1981 as Captain Nick Granger, also appearing in Waterloo Station and Special Squad. His guest credits include: Murder Call, All Saints and Always Greener.

John attended The Actors Studio in New York in the 1980s, where he took some master classes.

In 2005, John portrayed John Forsythe in Dynasty: The Making of a Guilty Pleasure, a fictionalised television movie based on the creation and behind the scenes production of the 1980s prime time soap opera Dynasty.

His theatre appearances include South Pacific (as Captain George Brackett), The Sound of Music (playing Captain Von Trapp), Oliver! (as Fagan), the world premiere of An Officer and a Gentleman (playing Byron Mayo) and the world premiere of Dr Zhivago (as Victor Komarovsky).

== Filmography ==
=== Film ===
Year	Title	Role	Type
1983	Skin Deep	Ray Scott	TV movie
1988	Outback Bound	Newsreader	TV movie
1996	Acri	Wyler	Feature film
2003	Lucy	Hubbell Robinson	TV movie
2005	Dynasty: The Making of a Guilty Pleasure	John Forsythe	TV movie

=== Television ===
Year	Title	Role	Type
1975	Matlock Police	Oscar Zolinsky	TV series, season 5, episode 178: "The Overlanders"
1977–1979	The Young Doctors	Dr. Chris Piper	TV series, 398 episodes
1979–1980	Skyways	Captain Nick Granger	TV series, seasons 1–2, 87 episodes
1981	Cop Shop	Clive Groves	TV series, 2 episodes
1983–1984	Waterloo Station	Detective Tony Harris	TV series
1984	Special Squad	John Sutton	TV series, episode: "Slow Attack"
1986–1987	The Challenge	John Longley	Miniseries, 6 episodes
1988	Australians	Dick Meagher	Miniseries, episode "John Norton"
1993	Time Trax	Roger Stevens	TV series, season 1, episode 13: "Darien Comes Home"
1993	G.P.	Garth Storey	TV series, season 5, episode 25: "Family Life"
1995	Space: Above and Beyond	Richard West	TV series, pilot episode
1999	Heartbreak High	Mr Cross	TV series, season 7, episode 18
2000	Tales of the South Seas		Miniseries, episode 8: "The Rabblerouser"
2000	Murder Call	Sebastian Tombs	TV series, season 3, episode 12: "A Stab in the Dark"
2002–2003	All Saints	Lindsay Green	TV series, seasons 5–6, 3 episodes
2002–2003	Always Greener	Gregory Kind	TV series, season 2, 6 episodes

=== Theatre ===
Year	Title	Role	Type
1974	A Little Night Music	Frid the Butler	Her Majesty's Theatre, Adelaide, Her Majesty's Theatre, Melbourne with J. C. Williamson
1977; 1981	Side by Side by Sondheim		Canberra Theatre, Theatre Royal Sydney, Comedy Theatre, Melbourne, Court Theatre, Christchurch with Globe Theatre Productions
1981	Something's Queer at the Pier		Manly Music Hall, Sydney
1981	On Our Selection	Sandy Taylor	SGIO Theatre, Brisbane with Queensland Theatre
1983	The Sound of Music	Captain Von Trapp	Princess Theatre, Melbourne
1984	Oliver!	Bill Sikes	Festival Theatre, Adelaide at Adelaide Festival Centre
1987	The Essential Coward - Private Lives		Sydney Opera House
1987	Olympus on My Mind	Jupiter	University of Sydney with Gordon Frost Organisation
1988	Faces in the Street		Seymour Centre, Sydney for Sydney Festival
1988	Man of La Mancha	Knight	State Theatre, Melbourne
1991	Death Trap		University of Sydney
1991	Arsenic and Old Lace		Playhouse, Adelaide, Comedy Theatre, Melbourne, Laycock Street Theatre, Gosford, Canberra Theatre, Suncorp Theatre, Brisbane
1992	Mary Lives!	Various roles	Malthouse Theatre, Melbourne, Monash University, Geelong Arts Centre with Playbox Theatre Company
1995	I Hate Hamlet		Arts Theatre, Adelaide
2005–2006	Fiddler on the Roof	The Constable	Capitol Theatre, Sydney, Lyric Theatre, Brisbane, Her Majesty's Theatre, Melbourne with TML Enterprises
2006	Titanic: The Musical	John Jacob Astor	Theatre Royal Sydney with Seabiscuit Productions
2011	Doctor Zhivago	Viktor Komarovsky	Lyric Theatre, Sydney, Her Majesty's Theatre, Melbourne with Gordon Frost Organisation
2012	An Officer and a Gentleman	Byron Mayo / Mullins / Worley	Sydney Lyric Theatre with Gordon Frost Organisation
2013	South Pacific	Captain George Bracket	Sydney Opera House with Opera Australia & Lincoln Center Theatre
2013	Anything Goes	Elisha Whitney	Princess Theatre, Melbourne, Lyric Theatre, Brisbane, Sydney Opera House with Gordon Frost Organisation & Opera Australia
