= I Can Jump Puddles =

Australian television series

- Created by: Alan Marshall (novel); Cliff Green (writer); Roger Simpson (writer)
- Written by: Cliff Green; Roger Simpson; Sonia Borg
- Directed by: Kevin James Dobson; Douglas Sharp; Keith Wilkes
- Starring: Lewis Fitz-Gerald; Tony Barry; Julie Hamilton; Adam Garnett; Ann Henderson; Lesley Baker; Bruce Kerr; Brian Hannan; Olivia Brown; Clare Binney; Earl Francis; Debra Lawrance; Darren MacDonald
- Theme music composer: Kevin Hocking
- Country of origin: Australia
- Original language: English
- No. of episodes: 9

Production
- Producer: John Gauci
- Editor: Edward Richard Lowe
- Running time: 48 min.

Original release
- Network: Australian Broadcasting Corporation
- Release: 7 June – 2 August 1981

I Can Jump Puddles is a 1981 Australian television mini-series based on the 1955 autobiography of the same name by author Alan Marshall. Adapted for television by screenwriters Cliff Green and Roger Simpson, the series starred Lewis Fitz-Gerald, Adam Garnett, Tony Barry, Julie Hamilton, Ann Henderson, Lesley Baker, Olivia Brown, Debra Lawrance and Darren MacDonald.

Several prominent television actors also had supporting roles including Lisa Aldenhoven, Kaarin Fairfax, Maurie Fields, Terry Gill, Reg Gorman, Matthew King, Julie Nihill, Maureen Edwards, Dennis Miller, Jason Donovan and Cliff Ellen.

== Plot ==
Based on Alan Marshall's three-part autobiography I Can Jump Puddles (1955), This is the Grass (1962) and In Mine Own Heart (1963), the film tells of Marshall's childhood growing up in rural Victoria around the turn of the century. Contracting polio soon after attending school, the story retells the obstacles he faced as a child in trying to overcome his disability. Later as an adult, he encounters prejudice due to his debilitating disease while looking for work in Melbourne.

== Cast ==
=== Main ===
- Lewis Fitz-Gerald as Alan Marshall
- Tony Barry as Alan's Father
- Julie Hamilton as Alan's Mother
- Adam Garnett as Alan (aged 11)
- Ann Henderson as Mary
- Lesley Baker as Matron
- Bruce Kerr as Dr. Robertson
- Brian Hannan as Alec
- Olivia Brown as Prostitute Maisie
- Clare Binney as Prostitute Filsy
- Earl Francis as George
- Debra Lawrance as Nurse Conrad
- Darren MacDonald as Steve

=== Supporting characters ===
- Lisa Aldenhoven as Mamie
- Christine Amor as Rose
- Peter Curtin as Flagger
- Leslie Dayman as Ted Wilson
- Jason Donovan as Freddy
- Marion Edward as Mrs Bronson (1 episode)
- Maureen Edwards as Mrs. Carmichael
- Cliff Ellen as Drunk
- Kaarin Fairfax as Rene
- Maurie Fields as Spruiker
- Terry Gill as Arthur
- Sandy Gore as Miss. Claws (1 episode)
- Vic Gordon as Drunk (1 episode)
- Reg Gorman as Arthur (1 episode)
- Billie Hammerberg as Mrs. Hale
- Leila Hayes as Miss. Bryce
- Edward Hepple as Tom
- Peter Hosking as Blue
- Matthew King as Urger
- Esme Melville as Miss. Forbes
- Dennis Miller as Gunner
- Julie Nihill as Young woman
- Anne Phelan as Lay preacher
- Ian Smith as Mr. Slade
- Fiona Spence as Mrs. Wilson
- Elizabeth Stevenson as Night sister
- Peter Thompson as Businessman
- Sigrid Thornton as Mabel
- Pepe Trevor as Pretty girl
- Mary Ward as Mrs. Birdsworth
- Roger Ward as Peter McLeod
- Cliff Ellen as Drunk

== Reception ==
The series was first aired on 7 June 1981 and ran for nine episodes. It was shown again two years later before being released on DVD by Roadshow Home Entertainment in August 2005.

The series ran in the UK on BBC2 in 1983, and in the Soviet Union in the late 1980's.

=== Awards ===
Adam Garnett, who played the 11-year-old Alan Marshall, won a Logie Award for Best Performance by a Juvenile in 1981.
