= Special Squad (Australian TV series) =

- Genre: Crime drama
- Starring: Alan Cassell; Anthony Hawkins; John Diedrich
- Country of origin: Australia
- Original language: English
- No. of seasons: 1
- No. of episodes: 43

Production
- Executive producers: Hector Crawford; Ian Crawford; Terry Stapleton
- Producers: Raymond Menmuir; Ross Jennings
- Production company: Crawford Productions

Original release
- Network: Network Ten
- Release: 1984

Special Squad is an Australian television series made by Crawford Productions for Network Ten in 1984.

== Overview ==
The series focused on an elite division of the Victoria Police, which handled crimes either too sensitive or specialist for regular squads. The Special Squad was headed by Det. Insp. Don Anderson (Alan Cassell), with his main operatives being Det. Snr. Sgt. Greg Smith (Anthony Hawkins), and Det. Sgt. Joel Davis (John Diedrich).

Special Squad was seen by some as an Australian answer to the British series The Professionals both for its focus on action and violence, and the fact that both programs were produced by Raymond Menmuir; story consultant Gerry O'Hara also worked on both shows. It was suggested in the press that the show was the most expensive yet made for Australian television; John Diedrich told writer/actor Barry Dickins that the show cost A$5 million. The first series was sold to Paramount Pictures for international distribution.

Special Squad lasted 43 episodes in total. In 2023, Crawfords produced a box set of all episodes on DVD.

== Cast ==
=== Main ===
- Alan Cassell as Det. Insp. Don Anderson
- John Diedrich as Det. Sgt. Joel Davis
- Anthony Hawkins as Det. Snr. Sgt. Greg Smith

=== Recurring ===
- Paul Dawber as Special Operative Johnson

=== Guests ===
| Actor | Role | Episode |
|---|---|---|
| Abigail | Mrs Quinn | Episode 18: "The Chen Legacy" |
| Alan David Lee | Jimmy Steele | Episode 36: "Return of the Cat" |
| Alex Menglet | Yuri | Episode 26: "Farewell to a Comrade" |
| Alister Smart | Haskell | Episode 21: "A Wild Oat" |
| Alwyn Kurts | Teddy | Episode 42: "Life After Teddy" |
| Anna Maria Monticelli | Teresa Parrissa | Episode 3: "Code of Silence" |
| Anne Phelan | Ma Robinson | Episode 33: "Ghosts" |
| Antoinette Byron | Jasmine | Episode 12: "The Golden Run" |
| Arna-Maria Winchester | Cassie Summers | Episode 17: "Wild Man" |
| Arthur Dignam | Grayson | Episode 19: "Child of Fortune" |
| Bartholomew John | John Sutton | Episode 14: "Slow Attack" |
| Ben Mendelsohn | Spud | Episode 14: "Slow Attack" |
| Betty Bobbitt | Daisy | Episode 32: "Until Death" |
| Billie Hammerberg | Alice | Episode 19: "Child of Fortune" |
| Bob Baines | | Episode 4: "Easy Street" |
| Brenton Whittle | Jeff Finnegan | 1 episode |
| Brian James | Bert | Episode 22: "Mates" |
| Brian Moll | Charlie Everett | Episode 14: "Slow Attack" |
| Briony Behets | Rhonda Watson | Episode 7: "The Second Mr. Swift" |
| Bruce Barry | Sloan | Episode 6: "The Long Secret" |
| Bruce Spence | Professor | Episode 36: "Return of the Cat" |
| Bruno Lawrence | Arthur Poole | Episode 32: "Until Death" |
| Bryan Marshall | Calvin | Episode 18: "The Chen Legacy" |
| Carmen Duncan | Lorraine | Episode 9: "Same Time Friday" |
| Chris Haywood | Jeff Carter | Episode 6: "The Long Secret" |
| Christine Amor | Robyn Symons | Episode 34: "The Haley Inheritance" |
| Christopher Milne | Sanders | 1 episode |
| Cliff Ellen | Priester / Technician | 2 episodes |
| Daniel Abineri | Dillon | Episode 41: "Mad Mountain Mumma" |
| David Argue | Bazza | Episode 27: "In the Cause of Justice" |
| Deborra-Lee Furness | Liz Jenkins | Episode 6: "The Long Secret" |
| Dennis Miller | Finch | Episode 33: "Ghosts" |
| Dina Mann | Mandy | Episode 11: "The Set-Up" |
| Dina Panozzo | Maria | Episode 3: "Code of Silence" |
| Dinah Shearing | Minster | Episode 23: "Big Bad World" |
| Elizabeth Alexander | Edith | Episode 8: "The Wurzburg Link" |
| Esben Storm | Cox | Episode 31: "Brothers" |
| Francis Bell | Burnett | Episode 8: "The Wurzburg Link" |
| Frank Gallacher | Slater | Episode 24: "Earlybird" |
| Frank Wilson | Dorahee | Episode 27: "In the Cause of Justice" |
| Frankie J. Holden | Tony | 3 episodes |
| Genevieve Mooy | Melissa | Episode 42: "Life After Teddy" |
| Gennie Nevinson | Kate | Episode 32: "Until Death" |
| Geoff Cartwright | Dusan Narros | Episode 29: "Killer" |
| Gerard Kennedy | Harry Tait | Episode 1: "Trojan Horses" |
| Gerard Maguire | Hansen | Episode 8: "The Wurzburg Link" |
| Gil Tucker | Hammond | Episode 41: "Mad Mountain Mumma" |
| Glenn Robbins | | Episode 21: "A Wild Oat" |
| Grigor Taylor | Bob Daley | Episode 23: "Big Bad World" |
| Gus Mercurio | Haliwell | Episode 38: "Mombasa" |
| Ian McFadyen | Evans | Episode 5: "Counterfeit Lady" |
| Ilona Rodgers | Helen Anderson | Episode 32: "Until Death" |
| Ivar Kants | Scalese / Denning | 2 episodes |
| Jackie Woodburne | Sharon | Episode 22: "Mates" |
| James Smillie | Donaghue | Episode 9: "Same Time Friday" |
| Jane Clifton | Karen | Episode 31: "Brothers" |
| Jeff Truman | Bugs | Episode 24: "Earlybird" |
| Jennifer Hagan | Rachel | Episode 21: "A Wild Oat" |
| Jill Forster | Mrs. Watson | Episode 25: "The Bribe" |
| John Ewart | Mungo Lennox | Episode 38: "Mombassa" |
| John Frawley | Whiteman | Episode 34: "The Haley Inheritance" |
| John Gaden | Angel | Episode 25: "The Bribe" |
| John Gregg | Golodkin | Episode 26: "Farewell to a Comrade" |
| John Jarratt | Michael Cohen | Episode 39: "The Haunting" |
| John McTernan | Ted | Episode 22: "Mates" |
| John Orcsik | Ted Rafferty | Episode 15: "Country Girl" |
| John Wood | Barron / Cawley | 2 episodes |
| Jon Blake | Pig | Episode 13: "Jacko" |
| Jon Finlayson | Devonport | Episode 11: "The Set-Up" |
| Jonathan Sweet | Del | Episode 24: "Earlybird" |
| Judith McGrath | June Holgate | Episode 26: "Farewell to a Comrade" |
| Julia Blake | Mrs Stevens | Episode 15: "Country Girl" |
| Julianna Allan | | Episode 4: "Easy Street" |
| Julie Nihill | Tina | Episode 43: "Gone for the Doctor" |
| Kaarin Fairfax | Katie | Episode 17: "Wild Man" |
| Ken Wayne | Ted Baker | Episode 7: "The Second Mr. Swift" |
| Lesley Baker | Chambermaid | Episode 5: "Counterfeit Lady" |
| Leslie Dayman | Fitzgerald | Episode 28: "Hot Streets" |
| Liddy Holloway | Mrs. Tait | Episode 1: "Trojan Horses" |
| Lisa Aldenhoven | Gina Grazini | Episode 8: "The Wurzburg Link" |
| Lorna Lesley | Sharon | Episode 9: "Same Time Friday" |
| Louise Siversen | Laura | Episode 4: "Easy Street" |
| Lucky Grills | Earwig | Episode 36: "Return of the Cat" |
| Maggie Millar | Joyce | Episode 30: "The Patchwork" |
| Maria Mercedes | Maria Baxter | Episode 28: "Hot Streets" |
| Marina Finlay | Suzie | Episode 35: "Suzie's War" |
| Mark Mitchell | | 1 episode |
| Martin Vaughan | Ben Alexander | Episode 36: "Return of the Cat" |
| Maureen Edwards | Mrs Sharp | Episode 4: "Easy Street" |
| Max Phipps | Arthur Lambert | 2 episodes |
| Mercia Deane-Johns | Molly | Episode 35: "Suzie's War" |
| Michael Duffield | Fulcher | Episode 41: "Mad Mountain Momma" |
| Michael Long | Scarface | Episode 34: "Suzie's War" |
| Michele Fawdon | Maggie | Episode 36: "Return of the Cat" |
| Monica Maughan | Mrs Trane | Episode 8: "The Würzburg Link" |
| Myra De Groot | Grace Kiddell | Episode 7: "The Second Mr. Swift" |
| Nicholas Eadie | Driscoll | Episode 18: "The Chen Legacy" |
| Nick Carrafa | Camilleri | Episode 3: "Code of Silence" |
| Nick Tate | Len Harris | Episode 27: "In the Cause of Justice" |
| Nico Lathouris | Tommo | Episode 6: "The Long Secret" |
| Nigel Bradshaw | Gant | Episode 1: "Trojan Horses" |
| Nina Landis | Lisa | Episode 10: "Duel" |
| Norman Coburn | Griffin | Episode 5: "Counterfeit Lady" |
| Norman Kaye | Lenny / Skittles | 2 episodes |
| Pat Bishop | Barbara Prowse | Episode 16: "War" |
| Paul Karo | Shafer / Skinny | 2 episodes |
| Peter Cummins | Dixie Hanrahan | 1 episode |
| Peter Curtin | Thomas | Episode 13: "Jacko" |
| Peter Fisher | French | Episode 31: "Brothers" |
| Peter Moon | Eddie | Episode 11: "The Set-Up" |
| Peter O'Brien | Billy | Episode 16: "War" |
| Peter Sumner | Nick Hardy | Episode 1: "Trojan Horses" |
| Peter Whitford | Stan | Episode 28: "Hot Streets" |
| Philip Quast | Jaeger | Episode 8: "The Wurzburg Link" |
| Ralph Cotterill | Ambrose | Episode 20: "Business as Usual" |
| Rebecca Gilling | Helen | Episode 11: "The Set-Up" |
| Red Symons | Warton | Episode 9: "Same Time Friday" |
| Reg Gorman | Ryan | Episode 1: "Trojan Horses" |
| Rhys McConnochie | Mathieson | Episode 21: "A Wild Oat" |
| Richard Moir | Errol | Episode 43: "Gone for the Doctor" |
| Ricky May | Mandrake | Episode 27: "In the Cause of Justice" |
| Robert Coleby | Scott | Episode 22: "Mates" |
| Robert Grubb | Sims | Episode 19: "Child of Fortune" |
| Robin Ramsay | Massini | Episode 30: "The Patchwork" |
| Roger Oakley | Conlon | Episode 23: "Big Bad World" |
| Roger Ward | Bill Foster / Peaches | 2 episodes |
| Ronne Arnold | Kwan | Episode 23: "Big Bad World" |
| Roslyn Gentle | Judith Deans | Episode 14: Slow Attack" |
| Sally McKenzie | Hannah | Episode 26: "Farewell to a Comrade" |
| Scott Burgess | Michael | Episode 31: "Brothers" |
| Sean Scully | Leo Teller / Kevin O'Neill | 2 episodes |
| Serge Lazareff | Kellet | Episode 31: "Brothers" |
| Shane Briant | Ian Cummings | Episode 14: "Slow Attack" |
| Simon Chilvers | Maguire | Episode 12: "The Golden Run" |
| Steve Bastoni | Serge | Episode 17: "Wild Man" |
| Steve Bisley | T-Bar | Episode 24: "Earlybird" |
| Sue Jones | Nancy | 1 episode |
| Terry Gill | Lambert | Episode 25: "The Bribe" |
| Terry McDermott | Inspector | Episode 13: "Jacko" |
| Tim Robertson | Roberts | Episode 2: "The Expert" |
| Tina Bursill | Meredith | Episode 25: "The Bribe" |
| Tom Oliver | Tobin | Episode 3: "Code of Silence" |
| Tommy Dysart | Scottie / Bingo Caller | 2 episodes |
| Tony Bonner | Carver | Episode 35: "Suzie's War" |
| Tottie Goldsmith | Fiona | Episode 9: "Same Time Friday" |
| Trevor Kent | Doggy Barker | Episode 4: "Easy Street" |
| Vic Gordon | Dr. John Perry | Episode 15: "Country Girl" |
| Vince Martin | Kelly | Episode 40: "Rotten Apple" |
| Vincent Ball | Morgan / Senior Official | 2 episodes |
| Vincent Gil | The Blindman | Episode 16: "War" |
| Willie Fennell | Sol Greenberg | Episode 32: "Until Death" |
| Wyn Roberts | Superintendent Kerslake | 3 episodes |

== Episode list ==
| No. overall | No. in season | Title | Directed by | Written by | Original release date |
|---|---|---|---|---|---|
| 1 | 1 | "Trojan Horses" | Ross Jennings | Shane Brennan | TBA |
| 2 | 2 | "The Expert" | Arch Nicholson | John Upton | TBA |
| 3 | 3 | "Code of Silence" | Rod Hardy | Vince Moran | 1984 |
| 4 | 4 | "Easy Street" | TBA | TBA | TBA |
| 5 | 5 | "Counterfeit Lady" | Patrick Edgeworth | Arch Nicholson | TBA |
| 6 | 6 | "The Long Secret" | Tim Burstall | Shane Brennan | 22 July 1984 |
| 7 | 7 | "The Second Mr Swift" | TBA | TBA | TBA |
| 8 | 8 | "The Wurzburg Link" | TBA | TBA | TBA |
| 9 | 9 | "Same Time Friday" | Chris Langman | David Wilks and Gerry O'Hara | TBA |
| 10 | 10 | "Duel" | Arch Nicholson | Luis Bayonas | TBA |
| 11 | 11 | "The Set Up" | Paul Moloney | John Upton | TBA |
| 12 | 12 | "The Golden Run" | Ranald Graham | Catherine Millar | TBA |
| 13 | 13 | "Jacko" | Arch Nicholson | Luis Bayonas | TBA |
| 14 | 14 | "Slow Attack" | Paul Maloney | Philip Dalkin | TBA |
| 15 | 15 | "Country Girl" | Arch Nicholson | Cliff Green | TBA |
| 16 | 16 | "War" | Catherine Millar | Everett De Roche and Vince Moran | TBA |
| 17 | 17 | "Wild Man" | Paul Moloney | Ranald Graham | TBA |
| 18 | 18 | "The Chen Legacy" | Chris Langman | Shane Brennan | TBA |
| 19 | 19 | "Child Of Fortune" | Tim Burstall | Ranald Graham | TBA |
| 20 | 20 | "Business As Usual" | Mark Joffe | Shane Brennan and Kris Steele | TBA |
| 21 | 21 | "A Wild Oat" | Brian Trenchard-Smith | Leon Saunders | TBA |
| 22 | 22 | "Mates" | Rob Stewart | Luis Bayonas | TBA |
| 23 | 23 | "Big Bad World" | Howard Rubie | Cliff Green | TBA |
| 24 | 24 | "Early Birds" | Rob Stewart | Michael Harvey | TBA |
| 25 | 25 | "The Bribe" | TBA | TBA | TBA |
| 26 | 26 | "Farewell to a Comrade" | Michael Caulfield | Shane Brennan | TBA |
| 27 | 27 | "In The Cause Of Justice" | TBA | TBA | TBA |
| 28 | 28 | "Hot Streets" | TBA | Michael Aitkens | TBA |
| 29 | 29 | "Killer" | TBA | TBA | TBA |
| 30 | 30 | "The Patchwork" | TBA | David Phillips | TBA |
| 31 | 31 | "Brothers" | TBA | TBA | TBA |
| 32 | 32 | "Until Death" | Rod Hardy | Vince Moran | TBA |
| 33 | 33 | "Ghosts" | TBA | Vince Gil | TBA |
| 34 | 34 | "The Haley Inheritance" | Colin Budds | Shane Brennan | TBA |
| 35 | 35 | "Suzie's War" | Dan Burstall | Luis Bayonas | TBA |
| 36 | 36 | "Return Of The Cat" | John Power | John Upton | TBA |
| 37 | 37 | "Pigs" | Ken Cameron | Shane Brennan | TBA |
| 38 | 38 | "Mombasa" | TBA | TBA | TBA |
| 39 | 39 | "The Haunting" | Tim Burstall | Luis Bayonas | TBA |
| 40 | 40 | "Rotten Apple" | TBA | TBA | TBA |
| 41 | 41 | "Mad Mountain Mumma" | TBA | TBA | TBA |
| 42 | 42 | "Life After Teddy" | Colin Budds | Shane Brennan | TBA |
| 43 | 43 | "Gone for the Doctor" | TBA | TBA | TBA |

== Home media ==
In January 2023 Crawford Productions announced that the series would be released on DVD in March 2023.

On 31 May 2023 Crawford Productions released the complete series on DVD.

| Title | Format | Ep # | Discs | Region 4 (Australia) | Special features | Distributors |
|---|---|---|---|---|---|---|
| Special Squad (Complete Series) | DVD | 43 | 09 | 31 May 2023 | None | Crawford Productions |
