= John Diedrich =

Australian actor, director and producer

- Born: John Edwin Diedrich; 25 February 1953 (age 73); Melbourne, Victoria, Australia
- Occupations: Actor; director; producer; singer
- Years active: 1974-2010

John Edwin Diedrich (born 25 February 1953 in Melbourne, Victoria) is an Australian actor, director, producer and singer, known for stage and television roles in Australia and the UK.

Diedrich was a child actor, debuting as the Artful Dodger in a J. C. Williamson production of Oliver!. In 1972, he produced, directed and starred (as Groucho Marx) in a 1972 production of Minnie's Boys. He also appeared in Melbourne productions of Salad Days, Lloyd George Knew My Father, Grease and Two Gentlemen of Verona. He played the lead role of Curly in the 1980 West End revival of Oklahoma! (for which he was nominated for an Olivier Award for Best Actor in a Musical), and also in the 1982 Australian tour. He replaced Philip Quast as Javert in the original Australian production of Les Misérables.

He directed, produced and starred in the Australian production of the musical Nine in 1987. He directed and produced the Theatre Royal, Sydney season of the musical Titanic in 2006.

Notable television roles include appearances in Class of '75, Bluey, Special Squad and The Challenge in Australia, and The Gingerbread Girl in the UK.
