= C/o The Bartons =

- Also known as: Care of the Bartons; The Bartons
- Genre: Children's drama
- Created by: Jocelyn Moorhouse
- Based on: The Siege of the Bartons' Bathroom (1986 short film)
- Written by: Jocelyn Moorhouse; P. J. Hogan; Noel Robinson; Shane Brennan; Greg Millin
- Starring: Olivia Harkin; Matt Day; Frankie J. Holden
- Composers: Royce Craven; Bryan Patterson
- Country of origin: Australia
- No. of seasons: 1
- No. of episodes: 12

Production
- Executive producer: Noel Price
- Producer: Jenifer Hooks
- Running time: 12 x 25 minutes

Original release
- Network: ABC Television
- Release: 29 February – 17 March 1988

C/o The Bartons (also called Care of The Bartons, or The Bartons in the UK and The Netherlands) is an Australian television drama series aimed at older children and young teens, which first aired in Australia in 1988.

== History ==
The series was based on a 16-minute short film Jocelyn Moorhouse had made in 1986, after receiving a grant from the Australian Film Commission in 1985, called The Siege of Barton's Bathroom. She based the plot on something that happened to her in her youth, and named the Barton boys after her house mates she lived with at the time.

The ABC was looking for a new children's drama and Moorhouse decided to send in her short film. Revcom producer Jenifer Hooks saw it, and commissioned Moorhouse to create the series. The first episode of the series is basically a remake of the short film, but with the cast of the series.

== Description ==
The series affectionately portrayed a suburban Australian family through the eyes of eleven-year-old Elly Barton, the only girl in a family of four children. Elly struggles with the way her authoritarian parents and her brothers treat her and prefers to retreat to the calm and peace of the old tree in her backyard. Elly herself behaves bossy and sometimes down right mean towards other children in the neighbourhood, including her best friend Anita, which sometimes gets her in unpleasant situations. The lessons that Elly learns from this, and the way they change her behaviour towards others for the positive, are a recurring theme in the series. The series is less upfront with the message it is trying to convey, often leaving this to the imagination of the viewer.

Among the new characters in the series was Anita McPherson, who is based on Moorhouse' real life childhood best friend in both name and appearance.

== Cast ==
=== Main / regular ===
- Olivia Harkin as Elly Barton
- Michael O'Reilly as Anthony Barton
- Matt Day as Paul Barton
- Ben Toovey as Douglas Barton
- Frankie J. Holden as Robert Barton
- Jennifer Jarman-Walker as Clare Barton
- Rosemary Smith as Anita McPherson
- Robert Essex as Mr (Laurie) Jensen
- Maureen Edwards as Miss Julia 'India' Snoller
- Alan Lovett as Mister Snoller
- Frank Webb as 'Skinner' Davies
- Natasha Kenneally as Susan Davies
- Christian Pellone as Vince Capaletti

=== Guests ===
- Lesley Baker – Mrs Davis (2 episodes)
- Louise Siversen as Angela (1 episode)
- Rachel Friend as Miranda (1 episode)

== Production ==
- Filming took place between March and mid August 1987, slightly overrunning its intended wrap date in the beginning of August.
- Moorhouse wrote nearly half the scripts for the series, with the rest written by Noel Robinson, Shane Brennan, Greg Millin, and P. J. Hogan (Moorhouse's husband, who would later direct the acclaimed Australian film Muriel's Wedding).
- Banksiawood, as featured in the series, is a fictional suburb of an unnamed large Australian city. In reality, most of the episodes were recorded in and around Glen Waverley, Monash City, a large suburb east of Melbourne.
  - The city centre, library and the Monash City Council hall are clearly visible in the episode Mr. Snoller's Black Bag. One scene of that episode was recorded in the library.
  - The girls in the Banksiawood Girl Guides, as seen in the episode Beautiful Beetroot, were in reality members of the Glen Waverley Guide Troup.
  - The mall seen in the episode Suspected is the Century City Walk mall on Kingsway, and the cinema in that episode is the Village Cinema that's located inside that mall.

== Release ==
c/o The Bartons aired twelve episodes between 29 February and 17 March 1988 as part of The Afternoon Show. It only aired once in Australia, on the Australian Broadcasting Corporation's ABC Television, after which the series was sold to several European networks through Revcom Television.

== Episodes ==
Series 1 (1988)
Nr.	Title	Director	Written by
1	The Siege of the Bartons' Bathroom	Richard Sarell	Jocelyn Moorhouse
Mr. Jensen convinces Robert to cut down the tree in the Bartons' backyard. Elly will not have anything of it and locks herself in the family bathroom (and everyone else out). Nobody is touching her tree!
2	The Barton League of Bird Lovers	Peter R. Dodds	Jocelyn Moorhouse
Elly and Anita start a bird lovers club. Conflict arises and Anita leaves to start her own, rival club.
3	Half-time	Richard Sarell	Paul J. Hogan
After being on reserve for the entire season of his Australian Rules Football team, Paul is finally put on the field during the finals. He sneaks away when no one is looking, feeling that football is not for him. Anita discovers that team captain Vince Capaletti fancies Susan Davies instead of her.
4	Mr. Snoller's Black Bag	Mandy Smith	Noel Robinson
Elly has discovered a large conspiracy against Banksiawood and Mr. Snoller is her main suspect. What exactly is in his black bag, who is Miss India really and why does she keep calling "Shere Khan"?
5	Three Little Pigs	Richard Sarell	Greg Millin
Somebody painted the word "pig" on Mr. Jensen's garbage can. Seeing as it is in red paint, Miss India's favourite colour of paint, Mr. Jensen suspects her. But Elly knows Miss India did not do it.
6	The Great Billycart Aid Race	Richard Sarell	Shane Brennan
Elly hears Bob Geldof's call to action to end world hunger. She organises a billycart race to raise money and "Feed the World". The whole Barton family and then some join in on the race. Who will win?
7	Position Vacant	Mandy Smith	Noel Robinson
Elly decides that Miss India should get a job; this will make saving up for her trip to India go a lot quicker. There is a vacancy for an administrative clerk at the local fire station and Elly thinks it is well suited for Miss India. But unbeknownst to Elly, her own mother also applied for the job. Who will get it?
8	Musical Rooms	Mandy Smith	Greg Millin
When Paul and Anthony fight for the umpteenth time, Robert and Clare decide that Anthony should get his own room. This means that everybody needs to switch rooms. Elly finds out Paul smokes and worries about him. She takes away his cigarettes to force him to quit, but Paul retaliates by kidnapping her diary.
9	Beautiful Beetroot	Mandy Smith	Jocelyn Moorhouse
Anita finally gets Elly to join the Girl Guides by telling her how amazing camp is. But camp not only turns out to be quite different than Anita would have Elly believe, but also to be a living nightmare as group leader Vivienne has it in for Elly and Anita. To make matters even worse, everybody has to eat double servings of beetroot...
10	Bartons on the Beach	Peter R. Dodds	Jocelyn Moorhouse
Elly and Anita burn Anthony's Playboy magazine, disgusted by the depiction of women in it. Anthony thinks Paul's taken it and wants it back. A day at the beach gets out of hand when Clare wants the family to wear matching bathers, a boy fancies Elly, and Paul and Anita are lost in the dunes. Meanwhile, Anthony tries to impress a girl who claims to be a mermaid.
11	Suspected	Peter R. Dodds	Paul J. Hogan
Anthony reckons Paul is not manly enough. Anthony worries that having such a soft mannered brother will hurt his reputation. He makes Paul take a test of his masculinity, but Paul fails on all four points. Time to get Paul a girlfriend, so no one "suspects" him (of being gay) and save Anthony's reputation. Elly has a problem too: she passes all four points of the masculinity test. Thankfully, Anita has some ideas on how to make Elly more feminine.
12	Bye Bye Bartons	Richard Sarell	Jocelyn Moorhouse
Robert gets offered a better job, one that requires the family to move to Mirandavale, on the other side of the city. This means leaving the Bartons' beloved Banksiawood house. The children were not told about the move until the last moment and are strongly opposed to it, but Robert and Clare ignore their pleas. Elly is hit hard by the fact that she will never see Anita again and the inevitable loss of her beloved tree. To make matters worse, Mister Jensen announces to Elly that he will resume his fight to get her tree taken down after she has moved away. Anita finally confesses to Paul that she is in love with him, but it falls on deaf ears.

== Book ==
Moorhouse also wrote a children's book based on the series, also titled C/o The Bartons. The plot of the book is based on the screenplays of several episodes from the series, some merged into a single story line or more clearly connected to each other. For example, the story lines of Half-Time and Musical Rooms directly follow each other in the book (there are four episodes between them in the series) and are connected; making the fight between the boys about Paul's actions during the football match instead of annoyances during studying like in the episode.

The book explores the thoughts and motivations of the characters more deeply than the series could do, and also makes some scenes seen in the show more intense.

There are differences between the book and the series, mostly in details. Most notably, Elly is twelve years old in the book, while she's eleven in the series. Although still taking place in the fictional Banksiawood, in the book the suburb is confirmed to be part of the Melbourne metropolitan area, about a 90-minute drive from the coast. Mirandavale is situated adjacent of it, unlike in the series where it is a two-hour drive between the suburbs.

The front cover of the book features a photo of Matt Day and Olivia Harkin. The back cover features a group photo of the cast on billycarts, made during the shooting of The Great Billycart Aid Race.

In the acknowledgements Moorhouse thanks the actors that appeared in her short film and the authors of the episodes adapted for the book's plot.

The book was published by Puffin Books on 30 March 1989 under ISBN 9780140342574. A second book was optioned by the publisher, but was never released.

== Film ==
The short film that was the basis for the series and the book featured a mostly different cast from the series. Frankie J. Holden is the only actor who appears in both. Among the actors appearing in the film are Rebekah Elmaloglou as Elly, Brendan Cowell as Paul and Max Phipps as Mister Jensen.

The film has not seen a commercial release and is not available on home media.

== Olivia Harkin ==
Harkin was 11 years old when she was cast as Elly in 1987. A year before C/o The Bartons, she, and several other children from her school, was part of the cast of the Kaboodle episode Snow White and the Dreadful Dwarves. In 1992, she had a guest role on the Australian police drama television series Phoenix. She focussed on stage performance after that, but did appear in a small role in the 2005 independently produced Australian short Lucy's Heart.

Below is a list of roles Olivia Harkin has played in productions categorised as "Pro-Am" by AusStage. Roles in productions categorised as "Amateur" by AusStage are not listed here, but can be found in the AusStage database.

- Chicago (20 February 2003, Erindale Theatre, Wanniassa, ACT)
- Gross Indecency: The Three Trials of Oscar Wilde (2 May 2003, Theatre 3, Acton, ACT)
- Fiddler on the Roof (19 February 2004, Erindale Theatre, Wanniassa, ACT)
