= Whose Baby? (miniseries) =

- Genre: Miniseries
- Based on: Whose Baby? by Colin Duck; Martin Thomas
- Written by: Vincent Moran; Peter Schreck
- Directed by: Ian Barry
- Starring: Angela Punch McGregor; Drew Forsythe; Wyn Roberts
- Country of origin: Australia
- Original language: English
- No. of episodes: 2

Production
- Producer: Mark DeFriest
- Running time: 2 x 2 hours
- Production company: Crawford Productions
- Budget: $2.7 million

Original release
- Network: Seven Network
- Release: 28 September – 29 September 1986

Whose Baby? is a 1986 Australian miniseries about a baby swap in 1945. It was filmed in Melbourne and Kyneton and had a budget of $2.7 million.

== Synopsis ==
Based on a true story from 1945 in Kyneton, Victoria, two baby girls are born within seconds of each other at the same hospital. In the months following, claims are made that the babies were switched at birth. A high court battle for legal custody of one of the children ensues, escalating to the court of appeal in the British Commonwealth, the Privy Council in London. The controversial story makes international news headlines.

== Cast ==
- Alan Hopgood as Kyneton Doctor 2
- Angela Punch McGregor as Gwen Morrison
- Bettina Welch as Sheila Dykes
- Drew Forsythe as Bill Morrison
- Geoff Parry as Policeman
- John Frawley as Administrator
- Lesley Baker as Marge
- Lisa Aldenhoven as Colleen Morrison (adult)
- Lisa Crittenden as Nola Jenkins
- Moya O'Sullivan as Amelia Williams
- Neil Melville as Jim
- Peter Aanensen as Robert Monahan KC
- Peter Curtin as Noel Jenkins
- Rhys McConnochie as Justice Barry
- Robyn Gibbes as Lee Morrison
- Ron Graham as Jack Galbally
- Terry Gill as Alan
- Vicki Luke as Jess Jenkins
- Vincent Ball as Bernard Nolan
- Wyn Roberts as Edward Hudson KC
- Peter Carroll as Narrator
