= Holidays on the River Yarra =

1991 film

- Directed by: Leo Berkeley
- Written by: Leo Berkeley
- Produced by: Fiona Cochrane
- Starring: Craig Adams; Claudia Karvan; Alex Menglet
- Cinematography: Brendan Lavelle
- Edited by: Leo Berkeley
- Release date: 3 October 1991
- Running time: 88 minutes
- Country: Australia
- Language: English
- Budget: A$425,000 or $480,000
- Box office: A$24,600 (Australia)

Holidays on the River Yarra is a 1991 Australian drama film directed by Leo Berkeley. It was screened in the Un Certain Regard section at the 1991 Cannes Film Festival.

== Plot ==
Disillusioned Melbourne teenage boys Mick and Eddie are looking for adventure and a means of escape. They unwittingly get themselves involved in a criminal enterprise, and somehow must find enough money to sail to Africa.

== Cast ==
- Craig Adams - Eddie
- Luke Elliot - Mick
- Alex Menglet - Big Mac
- Tahir Cambis - Stewie
- Claudia Karvan - Elsa
- Ian Scott - Frank
- Sheryl Munks - Valerie
- Angela McKenna - Mother
- Chris Askey - Mercenary
- John Brumpton - Mercenary
- Jacek Koman - Mercenary
- Eric Mueck - Billy
- Justin Connor - Danny
- Leong Lim - Shopkeeper
- Robert Ratti - Nick
- Arpad Mihaly - Chef

== Box office ==
Holidays on the River Yarra grossed $24,600 at the box office in Australia.

== See also ==
- Cinema of Australia
