= The Black Planet =

- Directed by: Paul Williams
- Written by: Paul Williams
- Produced by: Paul Williams
- Starring: Ross Williams; Brian Hannan; Terry Gill
- Production company: Fable Film Productions
- Release date: 1982
- Running time: 78 mins
- Country: Australia
- Language: English
- Budget: A$127,000

The Black Planet is an Australian science fiction film directed by Paul Williams and starring Ross Williams, Brian Hannan, and Terry Gill.

The plot is about two islands on the Planet Terre Verte. The planet is running out of energy, but is involved in an arms race. Despite this, President Kennealy is determined to send a mission to the newly discovered Black Planet. Non-too-bright Secret Agent Freddy Fairweather and Women's Libber Marigold Muffett get involved in hair-raising adventures as the drama unfolds, and the planet heads for nuclear war.
