= Skyways (TV series) =

1979-1981 television series by Crawford Productions

- Tony Bonner as Paul MacFarlane and Bill Stalker as Peter Fanelli in Skyways
- Genre: Soap opera Drama
- Created by: Terry Stapleton; Jock Blair
- Country of origin: Australia
- Original language: English
- No. of seasons: 1
- No. of episodes: 188

Production
- Production company: Crawford Productions

Original release
- Network: Seven Network
- Release: 9 July 1979 – 27 July 1981

Skyways is an Australian television soap opera drama series made by Crawford Productions for the Seven Network.

== Production and casting ==
The series, which aired from 1979 to 1981, was set at the fictional Pacific International Airport and dealt with the lives of the pilots, airline staff and management team who worked there.

Skyways was mainly taped in a television studio where, in many interior-set scenes, Colour Separation Overlay created the illusion of a bustling airport with taxiing planes outside the window. Many of the exterior scenes were shot on location at Melbourne Airport.

The show's regular cast members included Tony Bonner as airport manager Paul MacFarlane, later replaced by Gary Doolan (Gerard Kennedy). Tina Bursill played glamorous and ruthless assistant manager Louise Carter. Bill Stalker, played head of airport security Peter Fanelli, an ex-detective. When Skyways ended Fanelli was moved to Crawford police procedural Cop Shop, while Brian James' character George Tippett was transplanted to Holiday Island.

== Storylines ==
An early storyline featured a lesbian flight attendant (Judy Morris) unsuccessfully attempting to seduce a colleague (Deborah Coulls) who revealed she was heterosexual. Morris' character was soon afterwards stabbed to death in the shower as part of a murder-mystery storyline.

== International broadcast ==
The series screened across Europe and the UK during 1984-1986 on Sky Channel which would later become Sky One. It also aired in the UK on Astra Satellite channel, Lifestyle during 1990 at 1.00 p.m Monday to Friday.

=== Syndication ===
During the first week of January 2006 the entire series was replayed Thursday early mornings, weekly at 2.00am, then at the later time-slot of 3.00am on WIN TV in Wollongong (South Coast NSW) as part of the early morning Crawfords Classics TV series.

== DVD release ==
On 4 November 2024 Crawfords announced the series will be released on DVD. The release consists of a seven volume set.

Title	Format	Episodes	Original Melbourne airdates	Discs	Region 4 (Australia)	Special Features	Distributors
Skyways (Volume 1)	DVD	Episodes A-28		8	12 December 2024	Episodes A&B released on separate solo disc on 27 February 2025	Crawford Productions
Skyways (Volume 2)	DVD	Episodes 29-57		7	27 February 2025	None	Crawford Productions
Skyways (Volume 3)	DVD	Episodes 58-85		7	14 April 2025	None	Crawford Productions
Skyways (Volume 4)	DVD	Episodes 86-113		7	6 June 2025	None	Crawford Productions
Skyways (Volume 5)	DVD	Episodes 114-141		7	6 August 2025	None	Crawford Productions
Skyways (Volume 6)	DVD	Episodes 142-169		7	5 September 2025	None	Crawford Productions
Skyways (Volume 7)	DVD	Episodes 170-187		5	28 October 2025	None	Crawford Productions

== Cast ==
=== Main / regular ===
- Tony Bonner as Paul MacFarlane
- Tina Bursill as Louise Carter
- Ken James as Simon Young
- Bruce Barry as Douglas Stewart
- Bill Stalker as Peter Fanelli
- Brian James as George Tippett
- Joanne Samuel as Kelly Morgan
- Deborah Coulls as Jacki Soong
- Kris McQuade as Faye Peterson
- Bartholomew John as Nick Grainger
- Andrew McKaige as Alan MacFarlane
- Gaynor Martin as Mandy MacFarlane
- Gerard Kennedy as Gary Doolan
- Kerry Armstrong as Angela Murray
- Maurie Fields as Chas Potter
- Kylie Foster as Belinda Phipps
- Carmen Duncan as Elaine MacFarlane
- Fred Parslow as David Rankin
- Kit Taylor as Tim Barclay / Peter O'Neill
- Susanna Lobez as Janet Patterson
- Jeff Kevin as Geoff Goodwin

=== Recurring / guests ===
Actor	Role	Eps.
Alan Hopgood	Edward Fielding	2
Alex Menglet	Mikhail Gosenko	1
Anna Hruby	Sharon Webster	1
Anne Charleston	Wendy Stewart	2
Anne Haddy		1
Anne Phelan	Joan Hailey	1
Anne Tenney	Eileen	1
Barry Creyton	John Hunter	13
Barry Quin	Jeremy Drake	1
Belinda Giblin	Christine Burroughs	12
Billie Hammerberg	Mamma Fanelli	2
Brian Wenzel	Frank Richmond	1
Briony Behets	Pam McKinnon	1
Bruce Spence	David Howard	1
Catherine Wilkin	Hanna Clayton	1
Cecily Polson	Jocelyn Powell	3
Chantal Comtouri	Lorraine Cruikshank	1
Charles Tingwell	Harold Forbes	4
Christopher Milne	Brent Clarke / Hank	2
Cornelia Frances	Susan Winters / Wendy Kirk	2
Dannii Minogue	Amy	
Danny Adcock	Nigel Poulter	1
David Gulpilil	Koiranha	1
Debra Lawrence	Sheila Turner	1
Di Smith	Meg Robinson	1
Diane Craig	Catherine Tissot	1
Dina Mann	Fiona Woods	6
Don Crosby	Vincenzo Fanelli	1
Frank Gallacher	Marcel Boussac / Alexandrow	6
George Mallaby	District Attorney	2
Gerda Nicholson	Joan Fitzgerald	1
Graham Harvey	Greg Freeman	1
Grant Dodwell	Clive Simpson	1
Gus Mercurio	Willard Fry	1
Ian Smith	Col. Garner	2
Irene Inescort	Mrs. Young	15
Jackie Woodburne	Marie Newman	1
Jane Clifton	Shelley	1
Jason Donovan	Adam / Trevor Kirk	2
Jodie Yemm	Debbie Kennedy	1
John Frawley	Judge Smith	2
John Hamblin	Bob Kennedy	1
John Walton	Bryan Johnson	3
Jon Finlayson	Bruno	1
Judith McGrath	Dr Mendelsohn / Mrs Mason / Zoe Lawrence	5
Judy Morris	Robyn Davies	12
Judy Nunn	Bessie Langhurst	2
Justine Saunders	Helen Smith	6
Kylie Minogue	Robin	1
Kerry McGuire	Ann Driscoll	1
Lesley Baker	Gladys Skinner	1
Lewis Fitz-Gerald	Leslie Foy	6
Lorna Lesley	Pippa Shaw	2
Mark Littie	Jimmy McDonald	3
Martin Vaughan	Charlie Dat	1
Marty Fields		
Mercia Deane-Johns	Susan Masters	1
Michael Aitkens	Frank Harper	2
Michael Duffield	Sir Joseph Miles / Sir Godfrey Fox	9
Miles Buchanan	Bert Simpson	1
Monica Maughan	Mrs Jones	1
Nadia Tass	Sarah McGregor	1
Penelope Stewart	Barbie Beach / Jenny McKay	3
Penne Hackforth-Jones	Lady Pamela Griff	1
Penny Cook	Joanne Whicker	1
Penny Ramsey	Judy Pinnington	1
Peta Toppano	Sister Theresa	1
Peter Cummins	Les Mitchell / Raymond Dixon	2
Peter Curtin	David Kerridge / Roy Hamilton / Bob Marshall	3
Peter Hosking	Grigori Xanthos	1
Peter Sumner	Bob Cusack	2
Peter Whitford	Nigel Forsythe	1
Queenie Ashton	Mrs Fow	1
Ray Meagher	Sgt Murphy	1
Reg Evans	Errol Foote	1
Rod Mullinar	Geoff Blake	3
Roger Oakley	Joe D'Angelo	2
Ronald Falk	Derek Powell	3
Rowena Wallace	Ann Wallace	1
Sandy Gore	Yvonne Deauville	1
Shane Porteous	John Dermarney	1
Sigrid Thornton	Olivia Baker	1
Stefan Dennis	Richard	1
Sue Jones	Sue Bennett / Sandy	8
Terry Gill	Ed Sloane / Keith Shelton	2
Terry McDermott	Fred Manning / Captain Gardner	3
Tim Robertson	Bert Dyer	1
Tom Burlinson	Jim Backwell	1
Tom Oliver	Scott Honeyman	1
Tommy Dysart	Paddy MacDonald	1
Tracy Mann	Mickey Devine	1
Veronica Lang	Sarah Blake	3
Vincent Ball	Capt Fitzgerald	1
Wyn Roberts	Barney Waters	2

== Trivia ==
=== Kylie Minogue and Jason Donovan roles ===
In 1980, years before Neighbours and international pop stardom, Kylie Minogue and Jason Donovan appeared together in one episode as siblings.
