= Bluey (1976 TV series) =

1976 crime drama television series

- DVD cover
- Genre: Crime drama
- Written by: Jock Blair; Ian Jones; Vincent Moran; James Wulf Simmonds; Everett De Roche; Gerald Murnane; Robert Caswell; John Drew; Tom Hegarty; Gregory Lindsay Scott; Gwenda Marsh; Colin Eggleston; David Stevens
- Directed by: Graeme Arthur; Gary Conway; George Miller; Kevin James Dobson; David Stevens
- Starring: Lucky Grills; Gerda Nicolson; John Diedrich; Ken Goodlet; Terry Gill
- Theme music composer: Brian Bennett
- Country of origin: Australia
- Original language: English
- No. of seasons: 1
- No. of episodes: 39

Production
- Production location: Melbourne, Victoria
- Editors: Adrian Carr; Philip Reid; Ken Sallows
- Running time: 60 minutes (90-minute pilot)

Original release
- Network: Seven Network
- Release: 21 July 1976 – 25 April 1977

Bluey is an Australian television series broadcast by Seven Network in 1976 and made by Crawford Productions. it was co-created and written by Ian Jones.

The series was a police drama from Crawford Productions, but was different from many of their previous series—Homicide, Division 4 and Matlock Police—in that it focused on a single detective rather than an ensemble, and that the characters were not stock standard archetypes usually seen in police dramas. Stand-up comedian and vaudevillian Lucky Grills was cast as the titular Detective Sergeant 'Bluey' Hills, described as a tough, gruff, pig-headed detective with a proverbial "heart of gold" who, in contrast to the relatively straight detectives seen in Crawford's previous shows, was obese, drank heavily (even on duty), smoked heavily, visited local prostitutes, and would often enact physical violence on criminals.

Bluey premiered on Wednesday 21 July 1976 on ATN-7 in Sydney, as a 90-minute pilot episode, with the first 60-minute episode premiering on the following day, Thursday 22 July 1976.

== Cast ==
=== Main ===
- Lucky Grills as Det. Sgt. ‘Bluey’ Hills
- Gerda Nicolson as Sgt. Monica Rourke
- John Diedrich as Det. Gary Dawson
- Ken Goodlet as Assistant Commissioner
- Terry Gill as Det. Sgt. Reg Truscott
- Victoria Quilter as Jo

== Overview ==
Bluey was set at Melbourne's Russell Street Police Headquarters, with 'Bluey' Hills heading his own squad ('Department B'), due to his inability to work within the existing police squads. Department B was given cases that the other departments could not readily solve by conventional means, with Hills applying his unconventional methods to bring about their resolution.

Bluey was supported in his investigations by newly assigned Det. Gary Dawson (John Diedrich) long-time cohort Sgt. Monica Rourke (Gerda Nicolson), and undercover officer Det. Sgt. Reg Truscott (Terry Gill), who spent his time ostensibly working as a small-time burglar, and supplying Bluey with information on the activities of local criminals. Victoria Quilter also featured in early episodes as Dawson's girlfriend Jo Goldman, later replaced by Mercia Deane-Johns as Debbie Morley. Whilst a constant thorn in the side of the Assistant Commissioner (Ken Goodlet) and Superintendent (Fred Parslow), Bluey's methods were highly effective—while other squads didn't want him as a part of their team, they still sought him out when they could not get the job done.

Unlike other Australian TV series, where it was common practice to shoot interior scenes on 2 inch quadruplex videotape and outdoor shots on film, the series was entirely shot on colour film. The final episode, "Son of Bluey", featured an appearance by actor Don Barker as Det. Sgt. Harry White—the same character he played in Homicide.

== Lucky Grills as Bluey ==
Lucky Grills told TV Week magazine that after playing a guest role in an episode of Matlock Police someone thought of him for the role of Bluey.

His agent sent him a page of script, which he read and then went to audition. After the audition, it took ten days for the call to come through telling him he had the part. "It was Hector Crawford himself calling to tell me I had the role."

== Legacy ==
Around the same time the series was airing, Grills featured as himself in an episode of Crawfords sitcom Bobby Dazzler as a telethon guest, where reference was made to his role in Bluey.

Since the original TV run Bluey was replayed a total of three times on Channel Seven, the first being in Sydney between 10 and 24 November 1978 at a 2pm weekday timeslot. In Melbourne, it was repeated at 3pm between 27 July and 14 September, 1979. During the late 1980s period, Seven replayed it at an early 4pm timeslot weekday mornings and the final screening was in 1994 usually at a late night time-slot around 11pm or 12am weekly on Wednesday night or Thursday morning. This was in response to the success of "Bargearse" (see below). The series has not been replayed on television since that period, however, it is available as a DVD set from Crawford Productions.

Although the show only lasted for one year, Bluey found a new audience almost two decades later when dubbed clips from the show formed the basis for the popular The Late Show comedy sketch 'Bargearse'. In addition to two other guest appearances as himself, Grills also reprised his role as Bluey on The Late Show in order to protest the airing of the last Bargearse sketch.

Another enduring element from the show, the theme music — a library music instrumental composed by Brian Bennett titled "New Horizons" — is now best associated with coverage of cricket from Nine Network's Wide World of Sports from 1977 until 2018.

Of the cast members, Gerda Nicolson died on 12 June 1992, and Lucky Grills died on 27 July 2007. As a result of commentary on the Bargearse DVD release, Victoria Quilter is listed on several Internet sites—including IMDb—as a "missing person". However, as of October 2010, she was alive and well and living in Sydney.
