= Holiday Island =

1980s Australian television series

- Genre: Drama
- Created by: Terry Stapleton
- Written by: Jeff Peck; Brian Wright; Terry Stapleton; Dave Worthington
- Directed by: Colin Budds; Brendan Maher; Mark Joffe; John Barningham; Bob Meillon; Charles 'Bud' Tingwell
- Starring: Nick Tate; Caz Lederman; Steven Grives
- Theme music composer: Mike Perjanik
- Country of origin: Australia
- Original language: English
- No. of seasons: 1
- No. of episodes: 64

Production
- Executive producer: Ian Crawford
- Producer: Gwenda Marsh
- Running time: 48 min.
- Production company: Crawford Productions

Original release
- Network: Network Ten
- Release: 17 June 1981 – 1982

Holiday Island is an Australian television series made by Crawford Productions for Network Ten. The show aired twice weekly for a single season from 1981 to 1982, the show was unsuccessful and axed within two months of broadcast.

== Series synopsis ==
Like preceding Crawford's series, the aborted Hotel Story, Holiday Island was a Love Boat-style drama series set in a luxury hotel. This time the location was a tropical resort island in Queensland. In each episode the regular characters - the various islanders and hotel workers - hosted a new batch of guest star hotel guests. Various plots and situations on the show included a fierce cyclone hitting the island, children being kidnapped, a siege where the hotel workers were held hostage by less than pleasant guests, drug trafficking, the resort being terrorised by a biker gang and a politician dying of a heart attack while staying at the island's resort.

The series became notorious amongst critics for its allegedly poor production values, and the wintry conditions under which the so-called tropical drama was shot became the focus of most jibes. Though set in a tropical hotel with palm trees, sunshine and beautiful beaches, for practical reasons all interiors scenes - and the bulk of exterior scenes - were shot at the Ten Network's studios in Nunawading, Melbourne. The exterior set made heavy use of awnings in an attempt to disguise Melbourne's propensity for overcast skies, but attempts to mask the icy breath of the bathing beauties was not always successful. Attempts to shoot location footage in Queensland were hampered by the fact that the local television crews assigned to the shoot had experience only in shooting news footage, and the fact that heavy rain fell for several days of a planned shoot. Ray Meagher, a guest star in the show's first episode, later jokingly referred to the show as Horror Day on Iceland.

Location footage in Queensland was taken at the Tangalooma Island Resort on Moreton Island, east of Brisbane, Queensland. The "Tangalooma Ship-Wrecks" were often seen chroma-keyed as a background to the studio sequences of 'Banjo's' beachside shack.

== Cast ==
=== Main / regular ===
- Nick Tate as Neil Scott
- Tom Oliver as Wally Simmons
- Peter Mochrie as Tony 'Zack' Zackarakis
- Alyson Best as Lisa Kendall
- Frank Wilson as Banjo Paterson
- Patricia Kennedy as Emily Muldoon
- Caz Lederman as Angela Scott
- Steven Grives as Jason Scott
- Gaynor Martin as Kylie McArthur
- Marilyn Mayo as Dusty Davis
- Brian James as George Tippett
- Olga Tamara as Victoria Buckland
- Ronne Arnold as Alex Utalo
- John Blackman as Russell Parker
- Tracy Mann as Wendy Robinson

== Cancellation ==
Holiday Island was cancelled after 64 episodes. The set was later revamped and turned into the Lassiter's Complex featured in the soap opera, Neighbours.

== Reruns ==
Network Ten which was the TV series original broadcast channel replayed the Holiday Island TV series during the earlier part of 1990 at the graveyard time-slot of 4.00am weekday mornings. It had not been replayed until WIN TV began to show the entire series during 2006 as part of its early morning Crawfords Australian Classic series.

From January 2006 to March 2007, the WIN Television network repeated Holiday Island on early Saturday mornings from 2.00am before changing to 3.00am during the later half of 2006 as part of its Crawford's Australian Classics series.

== Reception ==
Robert Fidgeon of the Herald Sun named Holiday Island as one of "Australia's All-time Top 50 TV Turkeys". He stated "Shocker Melbourne soap about the antics of guests and staff of a Queensland island resort, starred Nick Tate. Planned as 64, one-hour episodes, axed within two months."
