= Carson's Law =

1983–1984 Australian television series

- Genre: Legal drama, (historical piece)
- Created by: Terry Stapleton
- Starring: Lorraine Bayly; Kevin Miles
- Opening theme: Independence
- Country of origin: Australia
- Original language: English
- No. of seasons: 2
- No. of episodes: 184

Production
- Running time: 50 minutes
- Production company: Crawford Productions

Original release
- Network: Network Ten
- Release: 24 January 1983 – 29 November 1984

Carson's Law is an Australian television series made by Crawford Productions for the Ten Network between 1983 and 1984. The series was a period piece set in the 1920s and starred Lorraine Bayly as progressive solicitor Jennifer Carson. The episodes revolved around the cases taken on by Jennifer, and the various personal intrigues of her family.

== Brief Synopsis ==
The series' premiere was billed as a 90-minute "movie-length" episode on 24 January 1983, with another two-hour episode in the same timeslot the following night, before settling into its twice-weekly 60-minute format the following week. Carson's Law was noted for its quality scripts and period production values. Despite being popular in Melbourne, where the series was based and filmed, it did not succeed in Sydney. Attempts to revamp the series to make it appeal more to Sydney audiences eventually alienated the programme's core audience, and it was cancelled in 1984 after 184 episodes. The final episode aired on ATV-10 on 1 December 1984; after being shuffled around the TEN-10 schedule, then reduced to one episode per week, then pushed back from 8:30pm to 9:30pm and, finally, to the even later 10:40pm slot, the final episode eventually aired in Sydney on 18 April 1985, and then returns on 5 April 1987 from 8:00pm to 9:00pm and the final episode aired on 29 January 1990.

== International Broadcasts ==
Carson's Law was bought by several members of the UK ITV network. TVS aired edited half-hour episodes on Thursdays and Fridays at 3.30pm in 1987 and 1988. At the same time, Yorkshire Television showed a considerable number of episodes on Thursdays at 1.30pm between October 1984 and March 1988. Television South West screened a slightly lower number in their 6.35pm slot on Tuesdays during 1984. Ulster Television aired episodes on Monday nights at 11.10pm up until at least October 1992.

Carson's Law was also shown in Portuguese television on RTP1 in the 80s under the title O Império de Carson (lit. The Carson's Empire), and was re-played on RTP memoria (trans. "RTP Memory") in 2008.

Carson's Law was shown in Catalan television (TV3) as well. The Catalan name for the series is Carson i Carson advocats.

Carson's Law was also shown in the Netherlands for its entirety by the NCRV broadcasting company. The company adapted the title to simply 'The Carsons'. It ran in the afternoon, and was quite popular.

Carson's Law was also shown in Israeli television (Channel 2, experimental broadcasting). It was called The race to the top of Jennifer Carson ("Ha-Merotz La-Tzameret Shel Jennifer Carson"). It ran on a weekly basis for about two years.

Carson's Law was also shown in Germany in the early 90s. It ran daily in the afternoon and was called "Carson & Carson".

== DVD Releases ==
The first 13 episodes of the series was released onto Region 2 DVD in the Netherlands in September 2009. The disc set has removable Dutch subtitles with all audio in English. In Australia seven volumes covering the entire series of 184 episodes are available to purchase from the Crawford Australia website (Region 4). From November 2015 all seven volumes can be purchased in the rest of the world through Crawford's UK distributor, Eaton Films Ltd.

Title	Format	Ep #	Discs	Region 2 (Australia)	Region 4 (Australia)	DVD Special Features	DVD Distributors
Carson's Law (Volume 01)	DVD	26	07	September 2009	October 2012	None	Crawford Productions
Carson's Law (Volume 02)	DVD	26	07	N/K	May 2013	None	Crawford Productions
Carson's Law (Volume 03)	DVD	26	07	N/K	July 2013	None	Crawford Productions
Carson's Law (Volume 04)	DVD	26	07	N/K	December 2013	None	Crawford Productions
Carson's Law (Volume 05)	DVD	26	07	N/K	March 2014	None	Crawford Productions
Carson's Law (Volume 06)	DVD	26	07	N/K	May 2014	None	Crawford Productions
Carson's Law (Volume 07)	DVD	28	07	N/K	September 2014	None	Crawford Productions

== Filming ==
The series was filmed at the Global Television Studios in Nunawading, Melbourne in the set next to where Prisoner was filmed with only a partition separating the two programmes.

== Cast ==
=== Main ===
- Lorraine Bayly as Jennifer Carson
- Kevin Miles as Godfrey Carson
- Jon Sidney as William Carson
- Gregg Cave as Billy Carson
- Melanie Oppenheimer as Sarah Carson
- Edward Upjohn as Sam Carson
- Christine Amor as Felicity Carson
- Ross Thompson as Robert Carson
- Louise Pajo as Margery Carson
- Chris Orchard as Thomas Carson
- Christine Harris as Amy Carson (later Garrick)
- Anna Maria Monticelli as Eva Tarrant
- Irene Inescort as Eileen Brennan
- Gordon Glenwright as Sgt. Vic Brown
- Noel Trevarthen as Gerard Kent
- Christian Horsley as Carson's love

=== Recurring ===
- Alan David Lee as Martin Barnes (5 episodes)
- Alex Menglet as Laszlo Novak (10 episodes)
- Bud Tingwell as Judge Warren / Brigadier Rattigan (5 episodes)
- Gerard Kennedy as James Dolman (8 episodes)
- John O'May as John Kendall (14 episodes)
- Jonathan Sweet as Kenneth Oakley (5 episodes)
- Michael Duffield as Harry Armstrong / Judge / Doctor (3 episodes)
- Peter Curtin as Detective Sgt Clem Harvey (8 episodes)
- Peter Whitford as Don Randall / Inspector Hudson (10 episodes)
- Roger Ward as Algernon 'Slammer' McQuade (3 episodes)
- Shane Connor as Clerk / Joe / Gil Bishop / Albert Rudge (6 episodes)
- Tom E. Lewis as Johnny Bryant (3 episodes)
- Wynn Roberts as Andrew Riley KC / Andrews (4 episodes)

== Episode list ==
Note: the first episode "The Clan" has been designated as episodes 1&2, as per the numbering on the Crawford Productions DVD release.

Series	Episodes	Originally released	
Series	Episodes	First released	Last released
1	93	24 January 1983	13 December 1983
2	91	17 January 1984	29 November 1984

=== Season 1 (1983) ===
1. The Clan, Part 1

2. The Clan, Part 2

3. The Witness

4. Requiem

5. Case Deferred

6. The Royston Trial

7. An English Gentleman

8. Foxtrot

9. The Medicine Man

10. Which Doctor

11. Swan Song, Part 1

12. Swan Song, Part 2

13. Happy Families

14. To The Future

15. Lost Soul

16. Pre-Selection

17. On The Fence

18. A Family Concern

19. Mistress

20. Reputations

21. Cause

22. Trial And Error

23. Dead Men's Tales

24. Dead End

25. Candidate

26. Strange Bedfellows

27. Donnegan's Wake

28. Confession

29. Aftermath

30. Waywards From The Bush

31. All God's Children

32. Blessed Are They

33. A Useful Life

34. Greater Good

35. Chopsticks

36. In A Market Garden

37. The Prodigal

38. Razorman

39. Christmas Cheer

40. Wedding

41. Honeymoon

42. Private Life

43. Birthright

44. Heritage

45. Policeman's Lot

46. True Colours

47. Pound Of Flesh

48. In Service

49. Soiree

50. Best Laid Plans

51. The Sins Of The Sons

52. The Perfect Gentleman

53. Future Horizons

54. Happy Events

55. Scent Of Battle

56. The Fortune Teller

57. Fortune's Child

58. Fire And Misfire

59. St. Patrick's Day

60. The Masquerade

61. All That Glitters

62. Laugh, Clown, Laugh

63. Guardian Angels

64. Lost Opportunities

65. A Country Dance

66. Faith, Hope And Fencing Wire

67. A Matter Of Confidence

68. The Tender Trap

69. A Case For Compassion

70. From Small Acorns

71. Street Games, Night Moves

72. Deceptions

73. Orphans Of The Storm

74. Falling Star

75. Means To An End

76. Teapots And Tears

77. Seeing Stars

78. Mirrors And Dreams

79. The Americans Are Coming

80. Picking Up The Pieces

81. The Bolshevik

82. The Comeback

83. A Scent Of Lavender

84. Changes

85. Preferential Treatment

86. Growing Pains

87. A Weak Resolve

88. The Catch

89. Butcher's Picnic

90. Child Of The Storm

91. A Cat Among The Carsons

92. A Change Of Heart

93. Lunatic

=== Season 2 (1984) ===
94. The Sisters

95. A Chinese Puzzle

96. Humanitarian Grounds

97. A Case To Answer

98. Scarlet Fever

99. The Duel

100. Vale

101. Prelude

102. Power Games

103. Verdict: Not Innocent

104. The Portrait

105. A Small Misunderstanding

106. The Outsider

107. Lady Luck

108. Win Some, Lose Some

109. The Innocent

110. A Crime Of Passion

111. Virtue Undefiled

112. The Lost Weekend

113. The Tender Past

114. A Question Of Circumstance

115. White Knights

116. New Friends

117. Infatuation

118. Snakes In The Grass

119. A Man's Pride

120. Gentlemen's Agreement

121. Self Defence

122. Flash Point

123. Blood And Fire

124. Wedding Vows

125. An Anxious Advocate

126. The Devil's Work

127. The Last Goodbye

128. A Fond Concept

129. Luck Of The Draw

130. A Lucky Investment

131. Strike Me Lucky

132. The Performance

133. A Hold On Life

134. The Old People's Friend

135. The Last Enemy

136. A Small Favour

137. Throw A Seven, Part 1

138. Throw A Seven, Part 2

139. The Comeback

140. Wild Oats

141. Misalliance

142. The Arrangement

143. Hideous Night

144. Gambits

145. Smile For The Camera

146. Malpractice

147. Fear Is The Key

148. Fire And Ice

149. Fallen Into Darkness

150. Seeds Of Doubt

151. The Ivory Tower

152. To The Future

153. Heroic Deeds

154. Another Mrs. Carson

155. Desperate Measures

156. The Long Farewell

157. A Bob Each Way

158. The Lesson

159. One Step Ahead

160. The Wages Of Sin

161. The Mis-Shapen Effigy

162. Trial By Editorial

163. Ploys

164. Baying For Blood

165. The Dominant Gender

166. The Man's Rights

167. La Cenicienta

168. All Is Fair

169. Hell Hath No Fury

170. Beyond All Reason

171. The Break

172. End Of The Road

173. Wild Violets

174. Divide And Conquer

175. Blood On The Straw

176. Buying Time

177. A Question Of Liberty

178. The Scapegoat

179. Hide And Seek

180. My Father, My Son

181. Requiescat

182. The Heir Apparent

183. The Dark Tunnel

184. Daylight
