= Cop Shop =

1977–1984 Australian television series

- Created by: Terry Stapleton
- Starring: Peter Adams; Terry Norris; Paula Duncan; Lynda Stoner; John Orcsik; Gil Tucker; George Mallaby; Rowena Wallace; Joanna Lockwood
- Country of origin: Australia
- No. of seasons: 7
- No. of episodes: 582 (1 missing)

Production
- Running time: 55 minutes
- Production company: Crawford Productions

Original release
- Network: Seven Network
- Release: 28 November 1977 – 23 July 1984

Cop Shop is a long-running Australian police drama television series produced by Crawford Productions that ran for seven seasons between 28 November 1977 and 23 July 1984. It comprised 582 one-hour episodes.

== Synopsis ==
The show revolved around the everyday operations of both the uniformed police officers and the plainclothes detectives of the fictional Riverside Police Station. It also took a significant interest in the private lives of the characters.

While many Crawford Productions police dramas combined videotaped interiors with location footage shot on 16mm film, Cop Shop was shot entirely on video, including external scenes.

Two one-hour episodes were broadcast each week and featured a specific police investigation and a guest cast whose stories formed a self-contained narrative block. Alongside this the ongoing narratives of the regular characters continued in longer, more open-ended soap opera-style story threads. This same soap opera-drama series hybrid format was also used in the series Skyways, A Country Practice and Carson's Law.

Cop Shop celebrated its 500th episode on 18 July 1983 with a two-hour special.

After a run of six years, the show completed taping its last episode on 22 December 1983 and the final episodes were screened in the first half of 1984.

== Awards ==
Cop Shop won many awards, including Logie Awards for most popular series and most popular actors, with Peter Adams and Paula Duncan winning multiple times. The show also won a number of other industry awards.

== Cast ==
During its long run, many of Australia's new and established actors appeared in the show.

- Peter Adams as Det Jeffrey 'JJ' Johnson
- Tony Bonner as Det Snr Const Don McKenna
- Liz Burch as Liz Cameron
- Andrew Clarke as Max Saunders / Mervyn Young
- Terence Donovan as Det Sgt Vic Cameron
- Paula Duncan as Det Const Danni Francis
- Nicholas Eadie as Const Sam Phillips
- Alan Fletcher as Const Frank Rossi
- Billie Hammerberg as Insp Joyce Stratton
- Alwyn Kurts as Sgt Reg Wallis
- John Lee as Insp Ian Timms
- Joanna Lockwood as Valerie Johnson
- John McTernan as Sgt Tom Shannon
- George Mallaby as Det Snr Sgt Glen Taylor
- Terry Norris as Sgt Eric O'Reilly
- John Orcsik as Det Mike Georgiou
- Louise Philip as Claire O'Reilly
- Gregory Ross as Const Tony Benjamin
- Bill Stalker as Det Sgt Peter Fanelli (previously appeared as Fanelli in Skyways)
- Lynda Stoner as Const Amanda King
- Olga Tamara as Det Const Julie Mitchell
- Gil Tucker as Const Roy Baker
- Rowena Wallace as Pamela Taylor
- John Walton as Terry Linford Jones / Tom McNamara
- Patrick Ward as Const Peter Fleming
- Diane Craig as Alison Finlay / Eve Kadar (29 episodes)
- Lisa Armytage as Jennifer Grant (12 episodes)
- Anne Haddy as Louise Francis (8 episodes)
- Scott McGregor as Constable Stephen Waters (7 episodes)
- Peter Sumner as Detective Tom Foster (7 episodes)

== DVD releases ==
The series has been released exclusive to DVD in 22 Volumes

Title	Episodes	Discs	Region 4 (Australia)	Distributors
Cop Shop (Volume 1)	Episodes 1–26	7	28 April 2017	Crawford Productions
Cop Shop (Volume 2)	Episodes 27–52	7	1 August 2017	Crawford Productions
Cop Shop (Volume 3)	Episodes 53–78	7	27 November 2017	Crawford Productions
Cop Shop (Volume 4)	Episodes 79–104	7	29 January 2018	Crawford Productions
Cop Shop (Volume 5)	Episodes 105–130	7	13 April 2018	Crawford Productions
Cop Shop (Volume 6)	Episodes 131–156	7	16 July 2018	Crawford Productions
Cop Shop (Volume 7)	Episodes 157–182	7	28 September 2018	Crawford Productions
Cop Shop (Volume 8)	Episodes 183–208	7	14 December 2018	Crawford Productions
Cop Shop (Volume 9)	Episodes 209–234	7	15 February 2019	Crawford Productions
Cop Shop (Volume 10)	Episodes 235–260	7	15 April 2019	Crawford Productions
Cop Shop (Volume 11)	Episodes 261–286	7	28 June 2019	Crawford Productions
Cop Shop (Volume 12)	Episodes 287–312	7	4 October 2019	Crawford Productions
Cop Shop (Volume 13)	Episodes 313–338	7	25 February 2021	Crawford Productions
Cop Shop (Volume 14)	Episodes 339–364	7	23 June 2021	Crawford Productions
Cop Shop (Volume 15)	Episodes 365–390	7	2 November 2021	Crawford Productions
Cop Shop (Volume 16)	Episodes 391–416	7	9 December 2021	Crawford Productions
Cop Shop (Volume 17)	Episodes 417–442	7	3 February 2022	Crawford Productions
Cop Shop (Volume 18)	Episodes 443–470	7	1 March 2022	Crawford Productions
Cop Shop (Volume 19)	Episodes 471–498	7	6 April 2022	Crawford Productions
Cop Shop (Volume 20)	Episodes 499–526	7	3 May 2022	Crawford Productions
Cop Shop (Volume 21)	Episodes 527–529, 531–554	7	18 August 2022	Crawford Productions
Cop Shop (Volume 22)	Episodes 555–582	7	25 October 2022	Crawford Productions

== Broadcast ==
Cop Shop was originally screened in a twice weekly format on Monday and Thursdays at 20.30 in Sydney and Melbourne. At various stages of the series each city was either a week ahead or behind the other or at the same stage. Later the series changed nights in Sydney to Wednesdays and Thursdays and then Thursdays and Fridays. It was eventually screened as a two-hour weekly block in both cities on Mondays in Melbourne and Thursdays (later Saturdays) in Sydney. The final 36 episodes screened in a late night 23.30 slot in Sydney on weeknights from Monday 26 November 1984.

Cop Shop aired briefly during 1989 on the UK-based, pan-European satellite TV channel, Lifestyle. It aired during the afternoon along with another Crawfords Production, Skyways.

Season	Year	Episodes	Original Melbourne airdates	Original Sydney airdates
1	1977	Episodes 1–10	1977-11-28 – 1977-12-29	1977-11-28 – 1977-12-29
1	1978	Episodes 11–100 (Sydney 11–95)	1978-01-02 – 1978-12-18	1978-01-02 – 1978-12-28 (episode 95) / 1979-01-22 (episode 100)
2	1979	Episodes 101–189 (Sydney 96–189)	1979-01-01 – 1979-12-10	1979-01-04 (episode 96) / 1979-01-25 (episode 101) – 1979-12-17
3	1980	Episodes 190–279	1980-01-21 – 1980-12-08	1980-01-28 – 1980-12-11
4	1981	Episodes 280–365	1981-01-05 – 1981-11-12	1981-01-08 – 1981-11-12
5	1982	Episodes 366–451 (Sydney 366–448)	1982-01-25 – 1982-11-18	1982-02-04 – 1982-11-11 (episode 448) / 1983-01-27 (episode 451)
6	1983	Episodes 452–532 (Sydney 449–538)	1983-01-27 – 1983-11-14	1983-01-20 (episode 449) 1983-01-27 (episode 452) – 1983-12-10 (episode 532) 1983-12-31 (episode 538)
7	1984	Episodes 533–582 (Sydney 539–570)	1984-01-16 – 1984-07-23	1983-12-17 (episode 533) 1984-01-07 (episode 539) – 1984-12-28 (episode 570)
7	1985	Episodes 571–582 (Sydney only)	Completed in July 1984	1985-01-01 – 1985-01-16

== Producers and directors ==
- Hector Crawford – Executive Producer
- Ian Crawford – Executive Producer
- Ian Crawford – Producer
- Terry Stapleton – Producer
- Marie Trevor – Producer
- Philip East – Director
- Charles "Bud" Tingwell – Director
- Sean Nash – Director
