= Marty Fields =

Australian actor and comedian

- Born: 18 December 1961 (age 64); Australia
- Education: Melba Conservatorium
- Occupations: Comedian; host/mc; actor; writer; musician; singer; radio presenter
- Family: Maurie Fields (father), Val Jellay (mother)

Marty Fields (born 18 December 1961) is an Australian comedian, host/mc, actor, writer, musician, singer, and radio presenter from Melbourne.

== Early life ==
The son of Australian actors Maurie Fields and Val Jellay, Fields trained for fifteen years at the Melba Conservatorium in piano, voice and theory.

== Career ==
=== Screen ===
Fields began his acting career at the age of seven in the ABC television series Bellbird, which lead to further roles as a child actor, including in Homicide, Division 4, Matlock Police, The Sullivans and the 1973 miniseries A Taste for Blue Ribbons. He also had a lead role as Neil 'Stinker' Carter in drama series Marion in 1974.

He continued appearing in television series throughout his late teens and into adulthood including Skyways, Cop Shop, Carson's Law, The Flying Doctors, SeaChange and City Homicide. He made several appearances in Blue Heelers including a recurring role as Roy Holland.

His film credits include a small role in the 1988 film Evil Angels, alongside Meryl Streep and Sam Neill, based on the true story of the Azaria Chamberlain case. He later featured in 2006 arthouse film The Book of Revelation, 2007 superhero film Ghost Rider, alongside Nicolas Cage, 2011 Melbourne Cup biopic The Cup and 2018 comedy feature That's Not My Dog!.

Fields is particularly recognised from his comedic work on long-running variety show Hey Hey It's Saturday for four years, hosting the 'Great Aussie Joke' segment with his father, Maurie Fields. He continued his comic appearances on The Battle of the Sexes, Blankety Blanks and various other television shows.

Fields has also worked as a session vocalist for the ABC Network.

In 2005, he was inducted into the Australian Comedy Hall of Fame.

=== Stage ===
At the age of 19, Fields was Musical Director for a three-year touring production of Snow White and the Seven Dwarfs playing every major Australian country town. He has since starred in over a dozen musicals including High Society and Crazy for You, receiving a Green Room Award for Best Actor in a Musical in the latter. In 2000, he performed in the sell-out season of Guys and Dolls and in 2001, he starred in Anything Goes at the State Theatre, Melbourne. In 2005, he was cast at the last minute as Alfie Doolittle in My Fair Lady at Melbourne's Comedy Theatre, replacing Jon English, who had succumbed to injury.

Fields has played in several rock groups and cover bands including Coup De Ville, Vintage Red, Battle of the Piano Men and The Thin Twins. He was a founding member of The Australian Rat Pack with Bob Valentine and Lisa Edwards.

Marty began his stand-up career in 1987, playing the comedy circuit in the hotels and clubs of Australia. He has also played sell-out shows at the Melbourne International Comedy Festival.

He has also performed extensively around the world as a piano bar performer, including shows at The Riviera (Las Vegas), The New York Comedy Club (NYC), and Howl at the Moon (Chicago) and a three year residency at Melbourne’s Crown Casino. He has worked alongside performers including Marina Prior, Jimeoin, and John Farnham.

=== Writer ===
Fields has written two television comedy projects – The All Sports Show and Four Story Building, as well as short film screenplays. He is also the creator and composer of the Australian musical The Paradise.

As a composer, Fields has written radio jingles, musical scores for corporate events, and music and lyrics for the films Death of a Soldier (1986) and The Banjo Man. He has composed over three hundred songs, including "A Likeable Man" – a tribute to his father, Maurie Fields.

Fields has written many newspaper and magazine articles, including a column for the Herald Sun from 2011-2012 and a weekly comedy page in the Australasian Post magazine. He has written advertising copy for companies including Video City and Crown Casino.

He is also a best selling author of three comedy books, including "Dinkum Aussie Jokes", "Ripper Yarns" and "Takeaway Jokes", the latter being a collection of one-liners and short jokes, which went into two reprints and had international success.

=== Radio ===
Fields has a regular national comedy radio show, syndicated by 105 stations. He has also been a regular presenter on 3AW, appearing on shows such as Nightline, where he has filled in for Bruce Mansfield and Philip Brady.

== Personal life ==
Fields is based in Melbourne, where he lives with his wife and daughter. He is a patron of the Lost Dogs Home, and an ambassador of the Melbourne Storm.

== Awards and nominations ==
Year	Work	Award	Category	Result
	High Society	Green Room Awards	Best Actor in a Musical	Nominated
1992	Three Guys Naked from the Waist Down	Green Room Awards	Best Male Lead Actor in a Musical	Nominated
1997	Crazy for You	Green Room Awards	Best Male Featured Artist in a Musical	Won
1997	Marty Fields	Mo Awards	Best Stand Up Comedian	Nominated
2005	Marty Fields	Australian Comedy Hall of Fame	Inductee	Honoured

== Filmography ==
=== Film ===
==== As performer ====
Year	Title	Role	Type
1977	Break of Day	Bit part	Feature film
1988	Evil Angels	Commuter	Feature film
2002	Signs of Life		Feature film
2006	The Book of Revelation	Charging Officer	Feature film
2007	Ghost Rider	Surveillance Guard	Feature film
2011	The Cup	Shearer Bookie	Feature film
2018	That's Not My Dog!	Marty	Feature film
2018	Dying for a Laugh	Marty Moore	Short film

==== As writer ====
Year	Title	Role	Type
1986	Death of a Soldier	Music and lyrics	Feature film
	The Banjo Man	Music and lyrics	

=== Television ===
==== As performer ====
Year	Title	Role	Type
1969	Carols by Candelight	Santa Claus	TV special
1969, 1971	Bellbird	2 roles	
1970	Homicide		
1971	Division 4		
1973	A Taste for Blue Ribbons		Miniseries, 9 episodes
1974	Marion	Neil 'Stinker' Carter	4 episodes
1974	Matlock Police		
1977	The Sullivans		
1979	Skyways		
1979	Cop Shop		
1982	Getting in Gear		
1983	Carson's Law	Terry	1 episode
1986	The Great Bookie Robbery		Miniseries
1986–1991	The Flying Doctors	Musician / Burns / Organist / Piano Player	4 episodes
1993–1996	Hey Hey It's Saturday	Resident comic	
1994–2004	Blue Heelers	Sgt. Roy Holland / Des Blewitt / Steve Talmen / Geoff Wiley / Laurie Ratten	8 episodes
1995	Rainbow's End	Reg Parker	TV movie
1996	Blankety Blanks	Resident comic	
1998	Battle of the Sexes	Comedian	
2000	SeaChange	Mitchell Chatham	1 episode
2006	Stand Up Australia	Comedian	TV special
2008	The Singing Bee	Contestant	1 episode
2009	The Mutant Way	Guest comedy panellist	1 episode
2009	City Homicide	Zack Roberts	2 episodes
2011	Rush	Ned Meribel	1 episode
2012	Planet Unearth	Self	1 episode
2012	Woodley	Eric	2 episodes
2013	Cliffy	Ted	TV movie
2016–2018	Carols by Candelight		TV special
	The All Sports Show		
	Bid on TV	Host	

==== As writer ====
Year	Title	Role	Type
	The All Sports Show	Writer	
	Four Story Building	Writer	
2022	The Roast of Paul Hogan	Writer	TV special
2024	The Roast of John Cleese	Writer	TV special

== Radio ==
Year	Title	Role	Type
	Nightline with Bruce and Phil	Presenter	3AW radio show
	Afternoons with Denis Walter	Presenter	3AW radio show
	Sundays with Tom Elliot	Presenter	3AW radio show

== Stage ==
=== As performer ===
Year	Title	Role	Notes
1977–1983	Tikki & John's Theatre Restaurant		
1992	Three Guys Naked from the Waist Down		Universal Theatre Melbourne
1992–1993	High Society	Mike Connor	Playhouse Adelaide, Playhouse Melbourne, Suncorp Theatre, Brisbane, Canberra Theatre, His Majesty's Theatre, Perth, Her Majesty's Theatre, Adelaide, Comedy Theatre, Melbourne
1996–1997	Crazy for You	Lank Hawkins	Theatre Royal, Sydney, State Theatre, Melbourne – Won Green Room Award for Best Actor in a Musical
2000	Guys and Dolls	Nathan Detroit	State Theatre, Melbourne
2001	Anything Goes	Moonface Martin	State Theatre, Melbourne
2003	South Pacific	Luther Billis	State Theatre, Melbourne
2003	Hats Off!	Comedian	National Theatre, Melbourne
2004	High Society	Mike Connor	State Theatre, Melbourne
2005	Kiss Me, Kate	Gangster #1	State Theatre, Melbourne
2005	My Fair Lady	Alfie Doolittle	Comedy Theatre, Melbourne
2009–2010	Hats Off!	Comedian / Soloist	National Theatre, Melbourne

=== As writer / director ===
Year	Title	Role	Notes
1981	Snow White and the Seven Dwarfs	Musical Director	Theatre Royal, Hobart, Canberra Theatre
	The Paradise	Creator	Musical
