= Joan and Leslie (Australian TV series) =

Joan and Leslie is an Australian situation comedy series which screened on the Seven Network between 1969 and 1970. It was an adaption of the British television series of the same name, which was not screened in Australia.

== Cast ==
=== Main / regular ===
- Joan Reynolds as Joan Randall
- Leslie Randall as Leslie Randall
- Stan Penrose as Merv Kelly
- Leila Blake as Gina Cotter

=== Guests ===
- Maurie Fields as Policenan / Dr Smith (2 episodes)

== See also ==
- List of Australian television series
- Joan and Leslie
