= Mark Errin Rust =

Australian murderer

Mark Rust
- Born: Mark Errin Rust; 1965 (age 60–61); Adelaide, South Australia
- Other name: Mark Erin Rust
- Conviction: Murder x 2; Rape x 1; Assault x 1; Gross indecency x 1
- Penalty: Life imprisonment (murder); 12 years' imprisonment (assault, rape and gross indecency; concurrent); Indefinite detention order

Details
- Victims: 2
- Span of crimes: 1999–2001
- Country: Australia
- Date apprehended: October 2001

Mark Errin Rust (born 1965) is a convicted Australian serial sex murderer and rapist: he was convicted of two murders committed in 1999 and 2001 respectively. Rust is currently on an indefinite detention order.

He pleaded guilty in May 2003 to the 1999 murder of Maya Jakic and the 2001 murder of Japanese student Megumi Suzuki. At the same hearing, he also pleaded guilty to one count each of assault, gross indecency and rape, committed around the time of the murders. He was subsequently sentenced by the Supreme Court of South Australia to life without parole for the murders with a concurrent sentence of 12 years for the other offences.

Rust had a long history of sexual offending, beginning in his early teens. Parole Board chief Frances Nelson described Rust as a "classic example of escalating sexual offences" and called for treatment programs to be made available outside of prison to prevent similar cases.

== Early life ==
Rust was born in 1965 in Adelaide, South Australia. He began following women at the age of 13 and was first convicted of sexual offences in 1983. He would go on to be convicted of between 11 and 13 sexual offences between 1983 and 1999, including gross indecency, and an unknown number of other offences including arson and trespassing.

In 1992, at the age of 27, he was diagnosed with Klinefelter syndrome, a condition found in men which is caused by having two or more X chromosomes. Rust's physical symptoms included infertility, shrunken genitalia, and sexual difficulties. After his murder convictions, his diagnosis of Klinefelter's was linked to his sexual offending. During an episode of Inside the Mind of a Serial Killer, Dr Linda Papadopoulos stated that his sexual offending likely evolved out of the enjoyment he obtained from shocking others with his unusual physique, particularly his "shrivelled genitalia", and a 2004 psychiatric report stated that he found it "more thrilling to masturbate in front of a pretty woman, mainly due to the reaction it would provoke for his victim".

In June 1993, he was sent to prison for arson after he lit a fires in Kensington and Norwood which caused damage costing $642,000.

He married twice, but both marriages failed. His second marriage ended two months before he committed his first murder.

== Murders ==
On 12 April 1999, Rust saw Maya Jakic, aged 30, walking on the street and pulled over in his car to offer "a lift and some fun". She refused. He then got out of his car and exposed himself to her, at which point she laughed at him. He then attacked and killed her, dumping her body at the disused Payneham Police Station. Rust himself then contacted police to tell them about the body, but his first two attempts failed. In one of his failed attempts, he left a note on the windscreen of a police car parked at the Norwood Police Station, which was subsequently submitted as evidence against him.

Rust was not initially linked to the murder. He was sent to prison for an unrelated trespassing offence later in 1999, where he remained until 23 July 2001. Shortly after his release, he continued his sexual offending by accosting a woman who he then masturbated in front of in Cumberland Park. One day after this offence, on 3 August 2001, he stalked and murdered Megumi Suzuki, aged 18.

After Suzuki's murder he disposed of her body in a rubbish bin. He revealed this detail to police after his arrest, leading to a police search of more than 10,000 tonnes of rubbish before her body was discovered in December 2001, at a waste disposal facility in Wingfield, South Australia. Her body was later returned to Japan to be buried. The body of Maya Jakic was returned to Croatia, where she was buried near her mother's home.

Thirteen days after Rust murdered Suzuki, on 16 August 2001, he raped a woman at her workplace, but reportedly let her live because she pretended to enjoy his attack.

== Arrest and imprisonment ==
Rust was initially arrested for the rape on 16 August and placed on remand. While on remand, he boasted about the murders to other offenders, including that he had Megumi Suzuki's CD player in his cell. At the same time, Crime Stoppers played one of his phone calls to the authorities about Jakic's body in a request for information. An acquaintance of Rust's recognised his voice and named him as a suspect. His handwriting was later linked to the note left at Norwood Police Station.

Rust was charged with Jakic's and Suzuki's murders in October 2001. He showed little remorse for his crimes; when he was asked why he killed Suzuki during psychiatric assessment, he replied, "Because I did."

A suppression order preventing the media from naming the perpetrator of the murders was lifted in May 2003 after Rust pleaded guilty to two counts of murder and one count each of rape, assault and gross indecency. Justice Nyland subsequently sentenced him to life without parole for the murders and a concurrent sentence of 12 years for the other offences.

=== Application for non-parole period ===
On 22 September 2014, Rust applied to the court to have a non-parole period imposed on his sentence, which would allow him to apply for parole and potentially be released from prison once the non-parole period had expired. Prison authorities opposed the request, stating that he was "aggressive and abusive" towards prison guards, although Rust denied the allegations. Rust's counsel claimed that his whole life term made his imprisonment "particularly difficult" for his mental health. As of November 2017, the application is ongoing.

In addition to his custodial sentence, Rust is also subject to an indefinite detention order, imposed because he was declared "incapable of controlling his sexual urges". If he were to be made eligible for parole, the detention order would still prevent his release from prison.

== Media ==
Rust has been featured in episodes of the documentary series Inside the Mind of a Serial Killer (2015) and Forensic Investigators (2004).
