= Michele Anderson =

Michele Anderson may refer to:

- Michele Anderson (convicted murderer), convicted of killing several family members in 2007

== See also ==
- Michelle Anderson (born 1967), American lawyer and scholar
- Michelle Anderson (tennis) (born 1972), South African tennis player
