= Inside the Mind of a Serial Killer =

True crime television series

- Genre: True crime documentary
- No. of seasons: 2
- No. of episodes: 20

Production
- Running time: 45 mins (each episode)

Original release
- Network: UKTV
- Release: 2015 – 2016

Inside the Mind of a Serial Killer is a British true crime television series, made by FirstLookTV. It examines the crimes of various serial killers and speculates what may have made them kill. The show regularly features psychologists Linda Papadopoulos, Glenn Wilson, and journalist Paola Totaro.

== Episodes ==
=== Season 1 ===
- S01E01 Eddie Leonski
- S01E02 Angus Sinclair
- S01E03 Anders Behring Breivik
- S01E04 Surinder Koli
- S01E05 Mark Errin Rust
- S01E06 Stephen Griffiths
- S01E07 Joanna Dennehy
- S01E08 Israel Keyes
- S01E09 Anthony Sowell
- S01E10 Michel Fourniret and Monique Olivier

=== Season 2 ===
- S02E01 Anthony Shore
- S02E02 Kieran Kelly
- S02E03 Ian Brady and Myra Hindley
- S02E04 Sheila LaBarre
- S02E05 Douglas Perry
- S02E06 Todd Kohlhepp
- S02E07 William Inmon
- S02E08 Elizabeth Wettlaufer
- S02E09 Theodore Johnson
- S02E10 Richard Dorrough

== See also ==
- Born to Kill?
- Great Crimes and Trials
- Most Evil
