= Douglas Perry =

Douglas Perry may refer to:

- Donna Perry (serial killer) (born Douglas R. Perry), American serial killer
- Douglas G. Perry (born 1967), United States Navy vice admiral and submarine warfare officer
- Doug Perry, of American DJ and producer duo The Perry Twins (duo)
