= Donna Perry =

Donna Perry may refer to:

- Donna Perry (model) (born 1971), American model and actress
- Donna Perry (serial killer), American murderer
