= Forensic Investigators =

2004-06 Australian television series

- Genre: Factual/crime show
- Created by: Fiona Baker; Endemol Southern Star
- Starring: Lisa McCune
- Country of origin: Australia
- Original language: English
- No. of seasons: 3
- No. of episodes: 33

Production
- Running time: Approx. 60 minutes (including commercials)
- Production company: Southern Star Group

Original release
- Network: Seven Network
- Release: September 2004 – 25 October 2006

A Seven Network advertisement for the show

Forensic Investigators: Australia's True Crimes is an Australian television show hosted by Lisa McCune which aired on the Seven Network. It aired for three seasons from 2004 to 2006.

Focusing on actual Australian crimes, each episode unfolds the drama minute-by-minute showing viewers the tireless work of detectives, and the scientific procedures required to solve these mysteries.

The series includes exclusive footage that has never been seen outside the courtroom, including police videos, crime scene stills and ultra-realistic reenacted clips. The 1st and 2nd seasons have been released on DVD.

The third season featured a new time slot – Wednesday at 8:30 pm.

== Season 1 (2004) ==
- Episode 1
  Paul Denyer, 21, was responsible for the deaths of three young women (Elizabeth Stevens, 18, Debbie Fream, 22, and Natalie Russell, 17) in the suburb of Frankston, during 1993. The police had the odds stacked against them and would need to call on all their investigative and forensic skills to solve this crime.
- Episode 2
  A routine run on a quiet weekday morning leads to a gruesome discovery, throwing investigators into one of Australia's most bizarre murders.
- Episode 3
  Four bodies were found shot in a house in an outer suburb of Canberra. Inside the house was evidence that would not only lead investigators to the killer, but would uncover a secret buried for three years.
- Episode 4
  Neddy Smith had been given a life sentence when he confessed to the killing of Harvey Jones to his cell mate, giving a detailed account of how he killed him and where. In March 1995 a skull was found at Botany Beach.
- Episode 5
  A mother and her two children were found in their house brutally bashed to death. Was it a robbery gone wrong, or something far more sinister?
- Episode 6
  In April 1999, Maya Jakic's body was found covered under leaves and hidden in bushes out the front of an unused police patrol station in Adelaide, South Australia. Two years later, Japanese student Megumi Suzuki had gone missing and when police discovered her schoolbooks abandoned near a rail over-bridge they knew she had met with foul play.

== Season 2 (2005) ==
- Episode 1
  In December 1994, Andrew Astbury's body was found floating in Melbourne's Yarra River. He was a hard working, reliable 25-year-old man from a good family. So why was he murdered? Look at the brilliant detective and forensic science work that helped solve this chilling murder.
- Episode 2
  Queensland Cat Protection Society president Kathleen Marshall is found brutally stabbed to death. In a case involving rumours, cat-fights and fortune telling, the detectives rely on forensics and five tiny spots of blood to separate fact from fiction and point them towards the killer.
- Episode 3
  A young woman's body is found wrapped in plastic. Unidentified for several months, she became known as Jane Doe. Who was she and who wanted her dead?
- Episode 4
  The body of 22-year-old Tasmanian Amanda Carter was found alongside the Derwent River. It took 13 years and a revolution in forensic science to finally bring her killer to account.
- Episode 5
  This Granny Killer murdered six elderly women before his year-long reign of terror in Sydney's northern suburbs ended. How was the killer John Wayne Glover finally brought to justice?
- Episode 6
  Policewoman Angela Taylor was killed when a car exploded outside Melbourne's Russell Street police headquarters. What clues were found among the debris? Who was responsible?
- Episode 7
  When the battered body of Darryl Lewis is found dumped outside an ambulance station, police began an investigation that becomes one of the longest running in Queensland's history.
- Episode 8 (Part 1)
  In 1998, Wollongong was gripped by fear after the brutal deaths of shopkeeper David O'Hearn and Lord Mayor Frank Arkell.
- Episode 9 (Part 2)
  After committing two violent murders in Wollongong, Mark Valera became the youngest offender to receive a life sentence. While he's behind bars his father is brutally killed. But who committed that crime and what was the motive?
- Episode 10
  When 17-year-old US-born Gabriel Meyer first went missing in the Northern Queensland town of Innisfail, it was feared he'd been eaten by a crocodile, but the truth was far more sinister.
- Episode 11
  Samantha Bodsworth's body was found in a Noosa carpark one hour away from her hometown of Gympie. The killer thought he'd committed the perfect murder but a little-known area of forensic science would be his undoing.
- Episode 12
  Fifteen-year-old schoolgirl Janet Phillips went to a party in her home suburb of Wynnum on Brisbane's southside in July 1987 and never came back. Not long after she was reported missing her body was found a couple of kilometres away. Police had a strong suspect but they were unable to prove he'd killed the teenager. When DNA technology later became available they were astounded that their suspect was eliminated. Then, there was a further attack on a girl in Wynnum, with chilling similarities to the way police believed had been murdered 10 years before. Was it the same killer?
- Episode 13
  Danny John Wasley aged 30 years and Mark Andrew Banks aged 30 years disappear without a trace in Newcastle, during August 1999. In a case involving drug lords, revenge and cold blooded murder, police uncover a tangled web of lies which finds Kevin Paul Naismith born 15 August 1969 guilty of the two murders which took place at his home and burial of the two bodies in sand dunes at Stockton Bight sometimes known as Stockton Beach.
- Episode 14
  When Peter Astill went missing during August, 1998, it took three months before his decapitated body (missing his head and hands), and also wrapped in a blanket was found stuffed inside a wheelie bin floating in a river in Lower Colo. What could have been the perfect murder was proved wrong when the serial number of the wheelie bin fell into the bin after an attempt had been made to remove it. The bin had been silicon sealed and tightened with hex screws. Police crews tracked the bin back to belonging to his next-door neighbour Bruce Patterson who had killed Peter Astill on the outskirts of Sydney, and decapitated the body with an axe which belonged to the victim.
- Episode 15
  An Easter family holiday in 1998 ends in tragedy when a truck collides with a caravan on the Hume Freeway near Violet Town, killing a 12-year-old boy. The truck driver fails to stop. With no licence plate number and little to go on, finding the person responsible may take a miracle.
- Episode 16
  When caravan park manager named Angelo went missing from the small town of Millicent in South Australia, friends and family called everyone they knew to try to find him. Yet no one had seen or heard anything.

== Season 3 (2006) ==
- Episode 1 – The Valentine's Day Murders
  Date Aired: 9 August 2006
  Two women are found dead on Valentine's Day 1994 in a burning massage parlour in Sydney. The owner had been stabbed while her employee had been shot three times. It appeared that the manager was the target in the frenzied attack. Her husband told police she'd been receiving death threats prior to her death. But whether it was a disgruntled client or a rival business, he was unsure.
  As investigators delved into the manager's past and her final movements, all was not what it seemed. The attacker had started the fire to destroy any evidence but investigators were able to pick through the ashen remains and uncover the truth... a truth that would not only lead to her killer but to a murder spree spanning 10 years.
- Episode 2 – Till Death do us Part
  Date Aired: 16 August 2006
  In a small New South Wales country town, Ross Brown arrived home in June 2000 to find his wife Judith of 20 years, lying dead. After making the grisly discovery, he cradled her body and hysterically called for help.
  After hearing his cries, neighbours called police, who arrived to find the husband in an uncontrollable state of rage. Police at the scene noted his hostile behaviour as unusual. But did that make him the murderer or was he simply a husband grieving in anger for his slain wife?
  Detectives discovered the victim's watch had stopped at exactly 9.14 and 28 seconds. It was potentially the time that she'd been killed. Crime scene examiners also found the scattered remnants of two beer bottles, and a number of bloodied footprints and paw prints on the carpet through most of the house. In the main bedroom, drawers were open, clothes scattered, yet no valuables had been taken. The scene just didn't add up.
  Thanks to a forensic watchmaker's expertise and the purchase of a slab of beer to test some laws of physics, the true picture emerged and the motive for the woman's murder was discovered.
- Episode 3 – Flemington Armed Robbery
  Date Aired: 23 August 2006
  When armed robbers launched a surprise attack on security guards in the process of restocking two ATMs in January 2002, they did so in broad daylight along a busy shopping strip just minutes from the heart of Melbourne. So brazen was the assault, when police arrived moments later one witness told them he thought the balaclava-clad figures must have been making a movie.
  Examining the scene, it was immediately apparent the hold-up had been well-planned. Clearly the bandits were not amateurs. They had managed to escape with $150,000 but who were they?
  Thanks to the help of witnesses and some unusual forensic evidence, that included green floral contact paper and orange rope, detectives were eventually able to identify and capture the two masked men who'd committed this violent crime.
- Episode 4 – Turkish Consulate Bombing
  Date Aired: 30 August 2006
  The Melbourne suburb of South Yarra was rocked by a blast in the early hours of 23 November 1986. A car containing a bomb had exploded in the car park below the Turkish Consulate, wrecking the building and damaging shops in the area.
  An elite group of Victorian police were called together to find those responsible for the apparent act of terrorism. The discovery of human remains at the crime scene suggested the bomber had been killed in the explosion.
  While the bomber had been blasted beyond recognition, other vital clues had survived the explosion. Identifiable sections of the bomb car and a wallet containing vital links to those involved were recovered.
  Through careful examination of crime scene evidence, investigators were able to identify those responsible. The case was the first act of terrorism investigated and prosecuted in Victoria.
- Episode 5 – My Partner, My Killer
  Date Aired: 6 September 2006
  Patricia Byers and her partner of three years, John Asquith, were enjoying a romantic evening for two aboard the luxury cabin cruiser Misty Blue. Moored near Stradbroke Island, they enjoyed a meal together and had sex before retiring for the night in April 1993.
  Hours later, Asquith awoke covered in blood. He'd been shot in the head. When he found Byers lying on the deck, she claimed they'd been attacked by pirates. When police investigated the incident, they discovered Byers stood to gain almost $300,000 from Asquith's death through life insurance policies. Was she telling the truth about the pirate attack or had she pulled the trigger herself?
  As police delved further into Byers' history, they learned that her de facto husband Carl Gottgens had mysteriously disappeared in 1990. Was she the victim of a series of unfortunate coincidences? Or was she a black widow preying on men for money?
- Episode 6 – Who Killed Paul Snabel?
  Date Aired: 13 September 2006
  A man disappears without a trace. When parts of his beloved bike begin appearing in local tips and dams, suspicions of foul play prove correct.
  When Paul Snabel didn't return home for over a week in November 1989, his flatmate became concerned and reported him missing. Police were told he was last seen driving off into the distance on his motorbike, having consumed an entire bottle of whiskey before embarking on his journey home. Had Paul been involved in an accident and was he now lying injured in a ditch somewhere?
  But when the police began their search for the young man, parts of his motorbike began suspiciously appearing in rubbish tips and dams in the outer suburbs of Melbourne. The bike had been systematically dismantled... this had been no accident. Why would Paul destroy his beloved bike? Their hopes for his safe return were rapidly diminishing.
  As detectives delved further into Paul's last known movements, they uncovered a tangled web of lies and deceit. Slowly but surely detectives began to unravel the truth behind Paul's disappearance, relying on forensic evidence to link the offenders to this grisly crime.
- Episode 7 – Truong Kidnap and Murder
  Date Aired: 20 September 2006
  On 29 April 1996, Le Anh Tuan was kidnapped by three men from his Melbourne home. In broad daylight, neighbours watched as he was bundled into the boot of a car. His captors later demanded a $400,000 ransom for his safe return.
  In a series of phone calls, the kidnappers demanded payment and organised for the drop off to happen. But as the undercover operative drove Le's mother to hand over the money, things went horribly wrong.
  On 7 June school boys discovered Tuan's body in a Noble Park drain. He'd been shot in the head. While police targeted a Hong Kong-based drug trafficker as the mastermind behind the kidnap and killing, their job was to link him with his Australian-based operatives.
  What followed was one of the largest and most complex homicide investigations ever undertaken by Victorian Police. It crossed many continents, including the US, where a Marlboro baseball cap found at the kidnapping crime scene was identified as one of a limited number made as giveaways at duty-free outlets within the States. It provided investigators with the breakthrough they needed and led them to the people responsible.
- Episode 8 – Operation Sorbet
  Date Aired: 4 October 2006
  In April 2003, 125 kilograms of heroin with an estimated street value of $160 million landed off the coast of Victoria near the town of Lorne.
  Two men in a rubber dinghy had brought it over from an oceangoing vessel called the Pong Su. In the process of meeting their three-man shore party, the dinghy capsized and one of the men drowned.
  The Australian Federal Police had known about the drug running operation for some weeks and had undercover surveillance in place. But when the arrests occurred they could only find three persons of interest – one was still missing.
  As a special operations group dramatically boarded the fleeing ship, the Victoria Police found their missing man and because he held a GPS (Global Positioning System) in his pocket they were able to virtually retrace every step made by the smugglers.
  Like Hansel and Gretel, the forensic team came across breadcrumbs of evidence that would seal the four men's fate and put them behind bars for 16 years.
- Episode 9 – Catch Me If You Can
  Date Aired: 11 October 2006
  When a young police officer pulled over a car for a simple traffic infringement, he never imagined it would turn into a high speed chase. As they roared through the Sydney suburb of Chipping Norton, one of the passengers in the car leant out the window and began shooting at police. The offenders managed to escape the dramatic chase after crashing the stolen vehicle.
  Inside the car there were two items that didn't belong to the owner – cigarettes and a business card for a tattoo parlour. Police soon learnt that the car was linked to a robbery that had happened only minutes before. But this robbery would not be the last. Over a series of weeks a number of small businesses in the same area would be targeted and a woman would be shot in the process.
  The similarities of each robbery suggested that the same two men were involved and they were desperate but then a young girl appeared. Forensic evidence from all the crime scenes, stolen vehicles set alight, along with a geographical profile and an amazing car chase caught on police camera would lead investigators to the culprits
- Episode 10 – Park Family Murders
  Date Aired: 18 October 2006
  When a mother and her two small children disappeared in October 1996, their family and friends were baffled. Several theories began to emerge. There was a suggestion that they had been sold into the Asian sex trade; that she was in hiding or had committed suicide; or that they'd been tortured and killed as a warning to her gambling husband who wasn't paying his debts.
  He had disappeared too - but police knew he had flown back to his home country of China. Ten months later their bodies were found stuffed in suitcases and dumped in NSW bushland. Now forensic investigators could prove which theory was right.
- Episode 11 – The Sex Worker Murders
  Date Aired: 25 October 2006
  A semi-naked body of a woman was discovered in August 2002 beside a police station in the Brisbane suburb of Hendra. She'd suffered multiple stab wounds to much of her body. Within hours investigators knew the victim's identity. Her name was Jasmin Crathern, a local prostitute who'd spent many years working the streets of Brisbane's notorious red light district in Fortitude Valley.
  Although they knew the victim, discovering the identity of her killer would prove far more difficult. The only clues left at the scene were some dusty shoe and tyre prints, and initially investigators had no luck tracing this forensic evidence to a suspect.
  Then, a few months later, another prostitute from the Valley was found stabbed to death. But this time the victim, Julie McColl, had been tied up bondage-style. Was there a serial killer stalking Brisbane's street workers? Or were there two vicious murderers on the loose?
  Detectives would only uncover the truth after many months of painstaking investigation, during which they befriended Brisbane's street workers, met up with bondage devotees, and tracked down a unique Mitsubishi Ute that held many of the answers they'd been searching for.

== Infamous cases ==
Throughout all seasons of the show, Forensic Investigators has covered a few of Australia's most bizarre and gruesome crimes. The show has also covered some infamous serial killers and murderers, including:

- Paul Denyer: The "Frankston Serial Killer" murdered three women between June and August in 1993.
- Neddy Smith: Notorious Sydney gangster linked to several underworld murders during the 1980s. Smith was convicted of (and confessed to) two murders, that of Harvey Jones and the other of a tow truck driver.
- John Wayne Glover: The "Granny Killer" murdered six elderly women in broad daylight in Mosman between 1989 and 1990.
- Russell Street Bombing: A car bomb exploded outside the Russell Street Police Headquarters in Melbourne in 1986 killing policewoman Angela Taylor.
- Mark Valera: He murdered shopkeeper David O'Hearn and former Mayor Frank Arkell, and planned to murder his father. Later his father was murdered by his best friend on his sister's orders.
- Mark Errin Rust: Murdered Maya Javic in April 1999 near Adelaide and Japanese student Megumi Suzuki in 2001.
- Richard Leonard: In one of Australia's most bizarre murders, murdered Stephen Dempsey in 1994 and then he and his girlfriend murdered a taxi driver.
- Allen Thompson: Murdered The Milosevic Family (Radmila Milosevic, her de facto husband Tony and their two children) in the ACT in March 1984. Forensic evidence later connected him to the murder of Rad's two sisters who had died in a car crash in December 1981, where Thompson was the driver of the vehicle. He was one of Australia's worst killers at the time.
- Lloyd Clark Fletcher: Raped and attempted to murder a young girl in 1977, and later raped and murdered 15-year-old Janet Phillips in 1987. Between 1987 and 1997 he raped and attempted to abduct various other women in Victoria; other crimes were in Queensland.
- Pong Su Incident: A drug syndicate, importation of heroin into Australia.

== Home media ==
In early 2006, the 1st and 2nd seasons were released on DVD in Australia (region 4). Series 1 was also released in the US (region 1). South Africa was the only country to release the third and final series 3 on DVD in 2007.

Each episode on the DVDs has bonus features. The main feature is that each episode has a longer running time than when it was shown on TV. All the episodes have longer interviews with police, family or friends of the victim or victims, and even interviews with family or friends of the killer or killers. There are also more video clips and photos shown of the crime scene.

=== DVD releases ===
DVD title	Format	Ep #	Discs	Region 1 (USA)	Region 2 (UK)	Region 4 (Australia)	Special features	Distributors
Forensic Investigators Season 01	DVD	06	3	5 September 2006	N/A	8 May 2006	None	Destra Entertainment
Forensic Investigators Season 02	DVD	12	3	N/A	N/A	8 May 2006	None	Destra Entertainment
Forensic Investigators Season 03	DVD	11	4	N/A	South Africa (2007)	N/A	None	

=== Online streaming ===
All seasons of Forensic Investigators are currently streaming on Amazon Prime and 7plus.

Title	Format	Episodes #	Release date	Streaming Status	Streaming On
Forensic Investigators: Season 01	Streaming	Episodes 01–06	24 June 2019	Currently streaming	7plus, 10Play & Amazon Prime
Forensic Investigators: Season 02	Streaming	Episodes 01–16	29 July 2019	Currently streaming	7plus, 10Play & Amazon Prime
Forensic Investigators: Season 03	Streaming	Episodes 01–10	25 July 2019	Currently streaming	7plus, 10Play & Amazon Prime

== See also ==
- List of Seven Network programs
- List of Australian television series
