= The Steamboat Adventures of Riverboat Bill =

- Based on: The Incredible Steamboat Adventures of Riverboat Bill by Cliff Green
- Written by: Cliff Green
- Directed by: Paul Williams
- Starring: Frank Thring; Brian Hannan
- Country of origin: Australia
- Original language: English

Production
- Producer: Paul Williams
- Running time: 75 minutes

Original release
- Release: 1987

The Steamboat Adventures of Riverboat Bill is a 1987 animated Australian film set on the Murray River at the turn of the century. It was based on a popular children's novel by Cliff Green.
