= Killing of Mary Yoder =

2015 killing in the United States

Mary Louise Yoder (March 18, 1955 – July 22, 2015) was a chiropractor who died of poisoning, allegedly by the receptionist at her practice. The receptionist, Kaitlyn Conley, was convicted of manslaughter in 2018, after a first trial ended in a mistrial. The conviction was overturned on appeal in 2025.

== History ==
Yoder and her husband ran a small chiropractor's office together in Whitesboro, New York. She had been in good health, but her health declined precipitously in July 2015, ending in her death. Yoder's relatives believed the death was suspicious and contacted law enforcement. An autopsy determined that Yoder's death was caused by the anti-inflammatory drug colchicine, and ruled it a homicide. The Oneida County Sheriff's office received an anonymous letter in November that accused Yoder's son Adam of the killing. Adam's jeep was searched and a bottle of colchicine was found under a seat. However, he was out of town when the poisoning took place, and he said the bottle was planted.

The focus of the investigation centered on Kaitlyn Conley, who worked as a receptionist at the office, and had dated Adam Yoder. Conley was charged with second-degree murder in July 2016, accused of having poisoned Yoder at lunch during work. Conley acknowledged writing the letter and maintained that Adam was responsible for the poisoning. At trial, the defense pointed to Mary's husband Bill as the killer.

Conley's first trial, in May 2017, failed to produce a unanimous verdict and was declared a mistrial. In a second trial concluding January 2018, Conley was acquitted of second-degree murder but convicted of manslaughter and sentenced to 23 years in prison.

In 2019, the United States Supreme Court refused to hear an appeal by the Utica Observer-Dispatch regarding access to juror questionnaires in Conley's trial.

Conley's conviction was overturned in February 2025, when the New York Court of Appeals ruled that evidence from her cell phone was improperly obtained and should not have been allowed in court. The Oneida County district attorney moved to hold her pending a new indictment. After a county judge denied that motion, she was released from prison.

As of October 2025, the district attorney of Oneida County is pursuing a third trial against Conley. A date of April 2026 was set for arguments before an appeals judge in Rochester regarding sealed evidence.

== Media ==
The poisoning was presented on Forensic Files II, My Favorite Murder, and Crime Watch Daily, and twice on Dateline NBC. Conley was interviewed in the Hulu miniseries Little Miss Innocent.
