= Forensic Files II =

American true-crime documentary TV series

- Genre: Documentary; True crime
- Created by: Paul Dowling
- Starring: Various
- Narrated by: Bill Camp
- Country of origin: United States
- Original language: English
- No. of seasons: 4
- No. of episodes: 58

Production
- Executive producer: Nancy Duffy
- Running time: 22 minutes
- Production companies: HLN; Medstar Television

Original release
- Network: HLN (2020–2022); Investigation Discovery (2023)
- Release: February 23, 2020 – August 13, 2023

Related
- Forensic Files (1996–2011)

Forensic Files II is an American true crime documentary series as both a sequel and revival of Forensic Files. Broadcast by HLN for its first three seasons, its fourth season was broadcast by sister network Investigation Discovery. The series has been promoted as a separate continuation of the franchise to differentiate it from the original series, with Bill Camp succeeding Peter Thomas as narrator.

The series premiered on February 23, 2020, with a 16-episode first season. On May 12, 2020, the series was renewed for a second and third season. The second season premiered on July 11, 2021, followed by the third on February 27, 2022, and the fourth on July 9, 2023. Afterwards, the show was put on hiatus and has not returned with any new episodes as of 2026. It was announced in October 2026 that a 20 episode revival of the original Forensic Files format was to enter production with Radial Entertainment and Content Partners producing.

== Development ==
The last episode of the original Forensic Files series ("Expert Witness") originally aired on June 17, 2011. After the 2016 death of Forensic Files narrator Peter Thomas, the show's executive producer Paul Dowling ruled out the possibility of reviving the series, as he considered Thomas to be "irreplaceable". In October 2019, it was announced that the show would be revived with new episodes to air first-run on HLN in early 2020, with Bill Camp later announced as the new narrator.

== Production ==
The revival was clarified as being the first season of a new show, rather than the 15th season of Forensic Files, explained by series producer Nancy Duffy as having been done to "differentiate the new episodes from those that came before". Duffy explained: "When we talked about bringing back Forensic Files, a lot of people thought we just meant that we were gonna be [airing] old shows that we didn't previously air on HLN and there seemed to be a confusion about that, so [we changed the title so] there could be no confusion." Series creator Paul Dowling confirmed on Twitter that Forensic Files II was a new, separate show from the original Forensic Files.

== Ownership and distribution ==
In 2024, Content Partners LLC, a company focused on film and television intellectual property, acquired the catalog of the original series Forensic Files, including 400 episodes, as well as international distribution rights to Forensic Files II.

Following the acquisition, Content Partners announced several licensing and distribution initiatives related to the series. In 2025, the company announced a licensing agreement with NBCUniversal's Oxygen network to bring Forensic Files to the channel.

Content Partners also announced plans to adapt 15 episodes of Forensic Files into a vertical video format through GammaTime and partnered with FilmRise to update episodes of the original series in high definition using artificial intelligence technology.

=== Event reenactments ===
Unlike in the original Forensic Files program, actors were not hired to participate in reenactments of the cases dramatized in Forensic Files II. Instead, various employees of CNN and HLN were used to portray victims, suspects, and other individuals for dramatic recreations of real life events.

Series producer Nancy Duffy explained that the reenactments are filmed in a more "impressionistic" way than in the original series, so that the individuals used in the recreations "don't have to look identical" to the people they are portraying. As a result, faces are not shown in the recreations in the first season, only bodies from the neck down.

The second season occasionally shows faces similar to the people involved in the depicted events with the camera out of focus. Duffy elaborated that employees would approach her and ask to participate in the reenactments, saying that many were "excited" at the prospect of portraying individuals involved in killing, hiding, kidnapping, or the use of physical restraint.

== Episodes ==
=== Series overview ===
| Season | Episodes | Originally released | |
| Season | Episodes | First released | Last released |
|---|---|---|---|
| 1 | 16 | February 23, 2020 | April 12, 2020 |
| 2 | 14 | July 11, 2021 | August 22, 2021 |
| 3 | 16 | February 27, 2022 | August 21, 2022 |
| 4 | 12 | July 9, 2023 | August 13, 2023 |

=== Season 1 (2020) ===
The series premiere began with two back-to-back new episodes on February 23, 2020, beginning at 10:00 p.m. Eastern time. Two new episodes aired back-to-back each Sunday, with the final episode of the first season airing on April 12, Easter Sunday.

| No. overall | No. in season | Title | Original release date |
|---|---|---|---|
| 1 | 1 | "Buried Secrets" | February 23, 2020 |
In 2009, police officers and firefighters in Stow, Ohio, report to the scene of a suspicious house fire. All of the home's occupants escaped without harm, but resident Scott Purk alerted police suspicion by bringing up the death of his first wife Margaret, who supposedly committed suicide in 1985. After exhuming Margaret's body, the examination showed that she did not hang herself, but that she was strangled, leaving Scott Purk accused of arson, insurance fraud, and murder. Note: This episode was dedicated in memory of original Forensic Files narrator Peter Thomas, who died in 2016.
| 2 | 2 | "On the Rocks" | February 23, 2020 |
In December 1995, 17-year-old Krystal Beslanowitch leaves her motel room for a convenience store and doesn't return. That same day, her naked and bloody body is discovered near the Provo River with her head bashed in with nearby rocks. Blood evidence from the rocks would ultimately lead investigators to Krystal's killer, although it would take nearly 20 years and advances in DNA technologies to identify the murderer.
| 3 | 3 | "The Green Pen" | March 1, 2020 |
Just five days before a Yale University doctoral researcher was supposed to get married, she suddenly vanished. Video surveillance cameras show Annie Le entering her workplace on the day of her disappearance, but she never left. After her body is discovered in the laboratory basement, investigators find evidence above a ceiling tile, including the perpetrator's bloody clothes. Once suspects are ruled down, DNA evidence points to lab technician Raymond Clark as her killer.
| 4 | 4 | "Human Sawdust" | March 1, 2020 |
In 2005, suitcases containing human remains wash ashore near the Chesapeake Bay Bridge Tunnel in Virginia. Police release a composite sketch of the victim, who is later identified as Bill McGuire. Physical evidence from plastic garbage bags, couch fibers, and medical grade towels help to bring the victim's killer – his widow, Melanie McGuire – to justice.
| 5 | 5 | "A Killer Disguise" | March 8, 2020 |
In 2009, young mother Heather Strube is brazenly gunned down in a Target parking lot in Snellville, Georgia. The killer was wearing an obvious disguise, though it succeeded in hiding the killer's true identity. Witnesses say that the victim was confronted by a man before she was killed, but the discovery of forensic evidence and a powerful motive lead investigators to believe that Heather's killer was actually a woman – her ex-mother-in-law, Joanna Hayes.
| 6 | 6 | "The Barn" | March 8, 2020 |
In 2005, a popular handyman in Derry, New Hampshire is savagely beaten to death in a barn. Initially, authorities had no clue who could have wanted the victim dead, but several forensic clues found at the crime scene lead investigators to discover a complicated conspiracy with an unlikely mastermind and a motive almost too bizarre and too unbelievable to comprehend.
| 7 | 7 | "Portrait of a Serial Killer" | March 15, 2020 |
Daniel Lee Corwin, a Texas serial killer, was responsible for the kidnappings, rapes, and murders of several women in 1987. After abducting Wendy Gant, he stabs her several times and slits her throat, but inadvertently leaves her alive. After communicating in writing to a forensic artist, a composite sketch was developed and identified as Corwin. A fingerprint found in Gant's car helps send Corwin to death row, where he is executed in 1998.
| 8 | 8 | "The Ambush" | March 15, 2020 |
In 2008, Myrtle Beach, South Carolina resident Fred Engel disappears while checking his mail outside his upscale condominium. His body is found in nearby woods, and autopsy results reveal he was strangled to death. There are a few initial suspects in the investigation, but none of those leads pan out. However, when investigators turn to mobile device forensics, the evidence leads to Fred's wife Sherry and her secret lover as the prime suspects.
| 9 | 9 | "Family Tree" | March 22, 2020 |
In 1987, a young Canadian couple is brutally slain while on a road trip from British Columbia to Seattle, Washington. After their bodies are found, the victims’ families begin receiving disturbing letters. The case goes unsolved for more than 30 years, until forensic investigators use personal genomics to help solve the case, ultimately making forensic history.
| 10 | 10 | "The Letter" | March 22, 2020 |
In 2015, a health-conscious chiropractor from Whitesboro, New York, mysteriously dies. After Mary Yoder's autopsy shows the cause of death as colchicine poisoning, the investigation into her suspicious death becomes a homicide case. Digital forensics are used to tie Internet searches and an anonymous type-written letter to an unlikely suspect – her office administrator who was her son's ex-girlfriend.
| 11 | 11 | "Last Gasp" | March 29, 2020 |
In December 2011, mother of five Chanin Starbuck is brutally murdered in her Deer Park, Washington, home, and her body is found in a sexually suggestive position. Investigators believe Chanin's killer was someone she knew, and during their investigation, they find startling clues on her cell phone that help point to the murderer's identity.
| 12 | 12 | "A Killer Snapshot" | March 29, 2020 |
In November 2009, a young woman's body is found in Moss Bluff, Louisiana. Tattoos on the victim help to identify her as 19-year-old Sierra Bouzigard, and while the crime initially appears to be sexually motivated, no DNA is recovered from Sierra's rape kit. However, DNA under Sierra's fingernails matches DNA evidence found on a candy wrapper near the scene. After several years with no answers, Blake Russell is identified as a suspect using new DNA technology.
| 13 | 13 | "Church Lady" | April 5, 2020 |
In January 2008, 42-year-old Rhonda Smith was shot as she did temporary work in the office of the Trinity Evangelical Lutheran Church in Springfield Township, Pennsylvania. Another congregant of the church quickly becomes a suspect due to her bizarre behavior. The discovery of a .38 caliber revolver on the shore of nearby Lake Nockamixon helps to link Rhonda's killer to the gruesome crime.
| 14 | 14 | "Inside Pocket" | April 5, 2020 |
In June 2007, insurance agent Bob Eidman is shot execution-style in his St. Charles County, Missouri office. Despite the murder occurring in broad daylight, the killer escaped unseen, leaving no fingerprints behind. Years after the murder, touch DNA evidence found in the victim's back pocket is eventually able to lead investigators to a surprising suspect – one of Bill's insurance clients.
| 15 | 15 | "The Car Accident" | April 12, 2020 |
In March 2005, Rosemarie Essa was driving to a local movie theater when she collapsed behind the wheel of her car, bumped into another vehicle, and died. Suspicious investigators discover that her death was not what it appeared, and that she was actually the victim of cyanide poisoning, and the case leads to an international manhunt when a prime suspect flees to Lebanon.
| 16 | 16 | "The Black Hole" | April 12, 2020 |
In July 2000, the decomposing body of 22-year-old Misty Morse is found in the Indian River Lagoon. Her ex-boyfriend Brent Huck becomes an initial suspect, but there is little evidence at the scene. However, there are dog hairs found on duct tape on Misty's body, and testing mitochondrial DNA from Brent Huck's dogs' hairs helps to identify him as Misty's murderer.

=== Season 2 (2021) ===
Like the first season, this season began with two back-to-back new episodes on July 11, 2021, beginning at 10:00 p.m. Eastern time.

| No. overall | No. in season | Title | Original release date |
|---|---|---|---|
| 17 | 1 | "The Obsession" | July 11, 2021 |
The mysterious murder of young teacher's aide, Lisa Ziegert, leaves a hole in the heart of her small community in Agawam, Massachusetts. As the rumor-mill about suspects churned, the actual perp slipped further away. But generations of investigators and a scientific breakthrough leads to a shocking end to a tragic case.
| 18 | 2 | "The Ink Beads" | July 11, 2021 |
51-year-old father and teacher, Bill Sparkman is found hanging naked from a tree with the letters "FED" scrawled on his chest. With barely any evidence to work with, investigators turn to these letters for answers which leads to a surprising conclusion that no one saw coming.
| 19 | 3 | "The Rise" | July 18, 2021 |
A single mom looking for love, Lori Leonard, vanishes without a trace. Foul play is tragically confirmed when a large pickup truck toolbox opens to her body stuffed inside. Homicide detectives investigate men she matched on dating sites, another man she met at work, and finally, a lover with a secret and violent past. Can forensic evidence connect the dots and lead to justice under the law?
| 20 | 4 | "Ten of Hearts" | July 18, 2021 |
In 1972, a 20-year-old woman Jody Loomis sets out on her bike and never returns. Her body found just a few miles from her house in Edmonds, Washington, with a gunshot wound to the head. Who would do such a thing? Years go by without any hard evidence or leads, until a new generation of investigators and modern technology breaks the case and finally puts a face to the killer.
| 21 | 5 | "Heavy Metal" | July 25, 2021 |
In 1982, 37-year-old Navy lieutenant Lee Hartley is murdered while deployed out to sea. Cause of death? Arsenic poisoning. Investigators discover Lee had more than his fair share of enemies aboard the ship. But it takes years before investigators discover what really happened to Lee and who, ultimately, was behind this brutal murder.
| 22 | 6 | "Knots" | July 25, 2021 |
In 1977, a building manager finds the violated and lifeless body of a young woman, Lecia Schollmeyer, in the bathtub of her first apartment. When questioned, an ex-con living downstairs lies to police. But the lies alone do not prove murder and the case goes cold. Then a new forensic tool examines the old evidence. Will science point to a hidden suspect and crack the case?
| 23 | 7 | "The Orange Shorts" | August 1, 2021 |
A mortally wounded woman, Monica Schmeyer, crawls to call 911. Her husband who wants a divorce she will not give him, gets a hard look from police. But he says he has an airtight alibi for the exact time of the murder. The intricate forensic science of ballistics is brought to bear and draws a direct connection to an unexpected conclusion.
| 24 | 8 | "The Reunion" | August 1, 2021 |
Landy Martinez's final moments are caught on tape. The crime scene looks like a clear robbery-murder. Text evidence at first points to a jilted lover, but will his alibi check out? Now police identify a second suspect with a possible motive of deadly revenge. Forensic technology and DNA evidence combine in an attempt to make the case.
| 25 | 9 | "Personal Penmanship" | August 8, 2021 |
A deeply religious librarian, wife and mother named Gail Fulton, is shot execution style in Lake Orion, Michigan. Surveillance video reveals it was a trio of killers that took her down. Is there more to Fulton's background? Eventually, detectives get a break: a handwritten note. But will it provide enough clues to catch the mastermind behind this horrific killing?
| 26 | 10 | "Full Circle" | August 8, 2021 |
In 1990, three sex workers, Yolanda Sapp, Nickie Lowe, Kathy Brisbois, are brutally murdered and left along the banks of the Spokane River. A serial killer was on the loose—and detectives had few clues. Animal hairs, fibers and a fingerprint were found, but for years the perp was never identified. More than 20 years later there's a break in the case- and an arrest is finally made, but no one could have ever imagined who was behind this sinister crime.
| 27 | 11 | "Matching Palms" | August 15, 2021 |
On July 28, 1987, the body of Susan Woods is found by her father in her home in Stephenville, Texas. The killer manages to evade capture for almost two decades, but he leaves a critical piece of evidence behind his palm print. Detectives are determined to do whatever it takes to put a name and a face to the print.
| 28 | 12 | "Incendiary" | August 15, 2021 |
An early morning house fire kills Ebb "Doc" Whitley, the only doctor in the small town of Iaeger, West Virginia. An arson investigation quickly leads to the arrest of Jason Lively, the son of the doctor's long-time nurse. But when Jason's alleged accomplice walks free, the prosecutor is worried this might have been a miscarriage of justice.
| 29 | 13 | "Grave Justice" | August 22, 2021 |
On a brutally cold winter night in 1984, a young woman is found viciously murdered on the side of a rural Wisconsin driveway. The victim, Traci Hammerberg, had been out with friends for a night of drinking and partying. What happened? Detectives initially have plenty of suspects, but the investigation would remain unsolved. Until nearly three decades later, when forensics from an unrelated crime helps breaks the case.
| 30 | 14 | "Smoking Gun" | August 22, 2021 |
Charles Nieman, a hearing impaired 77-year-old, is attacked by a thief during a road trip and shot to death because the man cannot hear his assailant's demands. Random murders are among the hardest crimes to solve, but investigators are determined to bring his killer or killers to justice. Can advances in ballistics testing crack the case?

=== Season 3 (2022) ===
This season began with two back-to-back new episodes on February 27, 2022, beginning at 10:00 p.m. Eastern time. After a five-month hiatus, the season resumed with two back-to-back new episodes on July 31, 2022, beginning at 10:00 p.m. Eastern time.

| No. overall | No. in season | Title | Original release date |
|---|---|---|---|
| 31 | 1 | "Pulp Friction" | February 27, 2022 |
A massive explosion claims the life of Roberto Ayala. Authorities think it's an accidental death, but analysis of debris shows it's a bomb. Investigators have few suspects until they hear ominous rumors about a jealous rage.
| 32 | 2 | "Sole Mate" | February 27, 2022 |
When college student Johnia Berry is stabbed to death in her Knoxville, Tennessee apartment, suspicion immediately falls on her roommate. A bloody shoeprint left by the killer exposes a murderer with no history of violence and no reason to kill.
| 33 | 3 | "Marked for Murder" | March 6, 2022 |
Someone targets members of law enforcement in a peaceful Texas county. Numerous suspects emerge, and murders continue as detectives race against time. Finally, a single bullet casing uncovers the bizarre reason for which the killer wanted revenge.
| 34 | 4 | "Words Matter" | March 6, 2022 |
An Illinois mother and her two young children are brutally murdered in their beds. Lurid threats are spray-painted all over the walls of the crime scene. Detectives discover death threats sent to the family, exposing an unlikely killer.
| 35 | 5 | "Last Dance" | March 13, 2022 |
Carla Walker and her boyfriend are brutally attacked on Valentine's Day. She is found dead while her boyfriend escapes. The case goes cold for nearly 50 years before a new forensic test exposes a family man with a dark secret.
| 36 | 6 | "Dog Proof" | March 13, 2022 |
Three construction workers are found shot dead at a work site in South Bend, Indiana. Detectives find few suspects, but have one key clue: one of the killers stepped in dog feces during the murders. If detectives can find his shoes, they’ve got their man
| 37 | 7 | "Mix Matched" | March 20, 2022 |
Lydell Grant resolves to live a clean life after his release from prison. When he's later arrested and convicted for a bloody murder, he insists he's innocent. From behind bars, he's determined to use forensic science to prove his case. Note: This episode was given a "special presentation airing" prior to the official premiere of the season.
| 38 | 8 | "Matter of Time" | March 20, 2022 |
Linda Curry a successful San Clemente, California career woman keeps falling ill and doctors can't determine why. When she dies, they still have no explanation, until they find a key figure in her life who has been lying about his past.
| 39 | 9 | "Blanket Denial" | July 31, 2022 |
The body of criminology student Imette St. Guillen is found wrapped in a blanket alongside a desolate road in Brooklyn. Police discover that the bouncer at a bar is her killer.
| 40 | 10 | "Unraveled" | July 31, 2022 |
When 79-year-old Shirley Ramey is found shot to death in her home, investigators initially suspect her husband or a violent neighbor. Shell casings recovered at the scene and a high-tech database reveal an unlikely killer.
| 41 | 11 | "First Impressions" | August 7, 2022 |
Young single mother Elizabeth Garcia is abducted from a gas station and later found stabbed to death near an oil field. Detectives use shoe and tire impressions to weed out numerous suspects to find their killer.
| 42 | 12 | "Toxic Environment" | August 7, 2022 |
When a 23-year-old Marine collapses and dies, doctors initially believe a heart attack is to blame. But when arsenic is found in some of his organs, prosecutors charge his wife with murder. A quick-thinking attorney and toxicology testing uncover the truth and ensure that justice prevails.
| 43 | 13 | "Lost Connection" | August 14, 2022 |
When 18-year-old Tammy Bowers is abducted while talking on a pay phone, forensic evidence found on her clothing points police in the direction of a suspect who confesses that he didn't act alone.
| 44 | 14 | "In Deep" | August 14, 2022 |
A Los Angeles based kidnapping, ransom, and murder ring run by Jurijus Kadamovas and Iouri Mikhel is exposed when a pair of retired scientists use sonar equipment to locate its victims at the bottom of a reservoir.
| 45 | 15 | "The Telltale Marks" | August 21, 2022 |
Patients at the VA Hospital in Clarksburg, WV, keep dying after experiencing shockingly low blood sugar levels. An investigation into their deaths reveals that nurse Reta Mays is injecting patients with lethal doses of insulin.
| 46 | 16 | "Tell No Tales" | August 21, 2022 |
A 70-year-old, retired veteran Fernando Silva is found dead on his boat after a bad sea storm. Investigators from Warwick, Rhode Island later discover he was killed during an attempted robbery. Note: This episode was given a "special presentation airing" prior to the official premiere of the second half of the season.

=== Season 4 (2023) ===
This season began with a move to a new network Investigation Discovery

| No. overall | No. in season | Title | Original release date |
|---|---|---|---|
| 47 | 1 | "The Maidenwater Murder" | July 9, 2023 |
A true crime hobbyist connects a Utah Jane Doe to the missing persons case of Lina Reyes-Geddes from Youngstown, Ohio. Detectives suspects that the murder is connected to Scott Lee Kimball, but hard-pressed investigation points otherwise.
| 48 | 2 | "Men In Black" | July 9, 2023 |
An upscale apparel store in Bethesda, MD., is the site of a gruesome scene when an employee is killed and her co-worker is battered and tied up, but surveillance video and blood evidence shed further light on the crime.
| 49 | 3 | "Lil Miss murder" | July 16, 2023 |
Eight days after she had disappeared on her way to a family ski trip, an 18-year-old young woman's partially nude body is found floating in a river in Wyoming. Years later, DNA technology uncovers dark secrets that led to her demise.
| 50 | 4 | "Killer Alibi" | July 16, 2023 |
Monte Sereno, California law enforcement are stumped when an innocent man's DNA is found at the scene of a deadly home invasion of Ravi Kumra. Authorities team with the man's defense attorney to try to solve this complicated criminal investigation.
| 51 | 5 | "The Scent of Death" | July 23, 2023 |
Young mother Kelsey Berreth suddenly vanishes from Woodland Park, Colorado. When police trace her cell phone, it leads them to a surprising character with an even more surprising story.
| 52 | 6 | "Murder Mark" | July 23, 2023 |
Nikki Whitehead is found murdered in her home and there are two suspects with ample motive, but an unusual interview and security camera footage have investigators puzzled.
| 53 | 7 | "The Murder Irons" | July 30, 2023 |
After the discovery of the murder of 18-year-old Kalee Bruce in a Traverse City, Michigan beachfront condo, analysts use brand-new mitochondrial DNA technology to prove the killer's identity.
| 54 | 8 | "True Bugs" | July 30, 2023 |
July Fourth weekend leads to tragedy for a California family; to catch a killer, detectives use an unorthodox technique – analyzing bug fragments – to help put a murderer behind bars
| 55 | 9 | "Murder on Helium Road" | August 6, 2023 |
A Amarillo, Texas love triangle turns deadly for Robin Spielbauer. It appears to be an open-and-shut case until technology tells the tale.
| 56 | 10 | "The Burn Test" | August 6, 2023 |
A 33-year-old Morgantown, West Virginia husband and father Jimmy Michael seemingly dies in an accidental house fire. But a closer look at the scene reveals a more sinister case.
| 57 | 11 | "Broken Santa" | August 13, 2023 |
A family mourns the unexpected death of beloved grandmother Bernita Cunningham. While local police of Hubbardston, Michigan assure everyone that she was the victim of a tragic accident, some things about the scene don't add up.
| 58 | 12 | "Desperate Stakes" | August 13, 2023 |
When the 20-year-old shop clerk Enrique "E.J." Delos-Reyes is gunned down during a robbery, Atlanta investigators have only descriptions of the killers and the make of their getaway car. Investigators use a videotaped confession to smoke out the killers.
