= Cliff Green =

Australian writer (1934–2020)

Cliff Green OAM
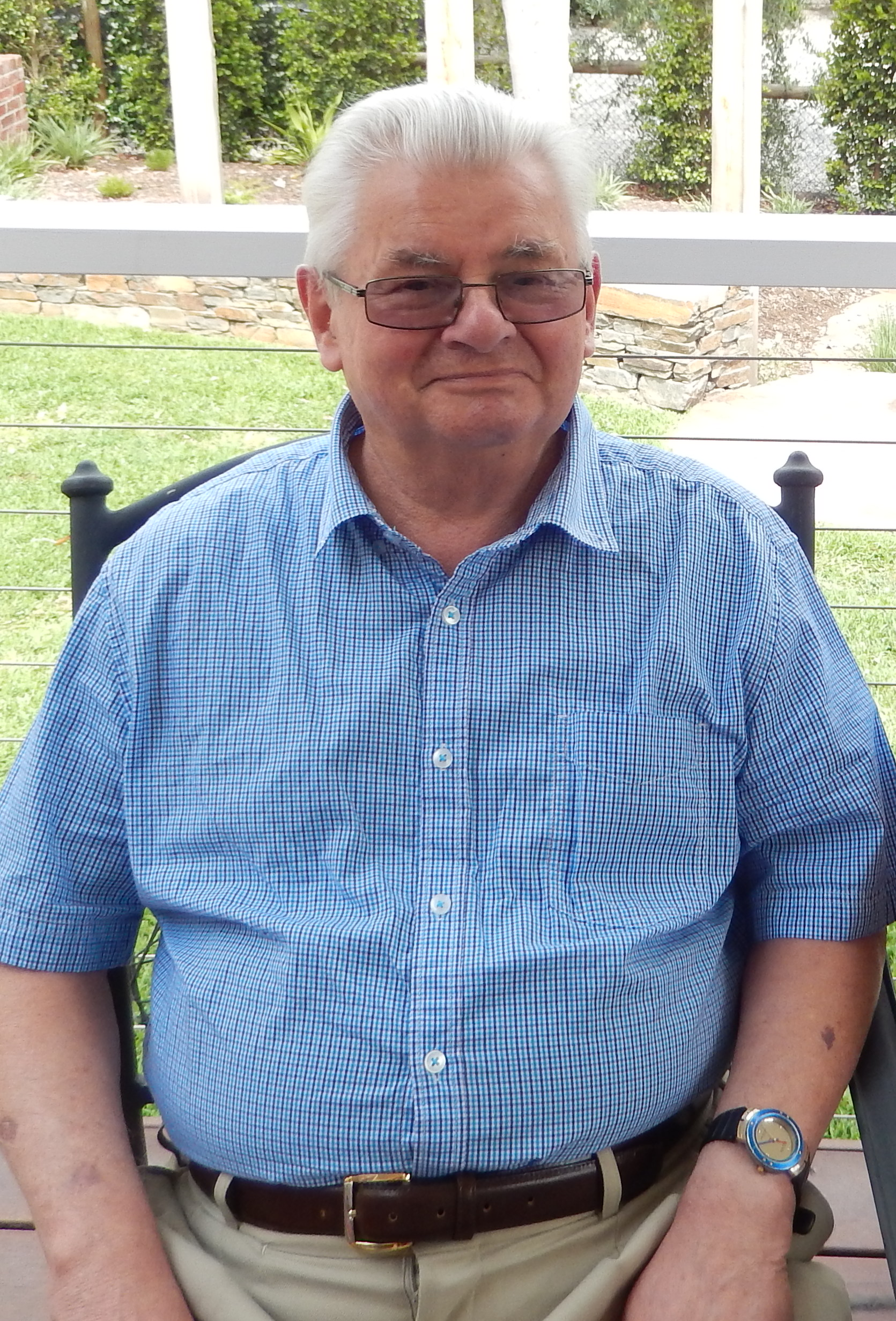
- Green in December 2013
- Born: Clifford Green; 6 December 1934; Melbourne, Victoria, Australia
- Died: 4 December 2020 (aged 85)
- Occupation: Screenwriter

Clifford Green OAM (6 December 1934 – 4 December 2020) was an Australian screenwriter, whose best known work is the script for the film Picnic at Hanging Rock (1975).

== Career ==
Green spent his early working life as a country school teacher, which was reflected in his script for the 1974 ABC TV series, Marion.

He was able to write in a wide variety of genres, and his screenplay for Peter Weir’s Picnic At Hanging Rock was a landmark in the renaissance of the Australian film industry in the 1970s. In 1981, the Australian Broadcasting Corporation produced I Can Jump Puddles, a mini-series written by Green, based on Alan Marshall's autobiographical stories. His screenplay for the 1990 TV movie, Boy Soldiers, was the first Australian drama to receive an Emmy nomination.

In the 2009 Queen's Birthday Honours List, he was awarded the Order of Australia Medal for services to the Australian film and television industry as a screenwriter and educator.

Green served on the board of the Victorian Film Corporation from 1977 to 1984.

In at least one screenwriting textbook, his writing for television is cited as an example of economy, wit and minimal formal camera directions.

Cliff Green died on 4 December 2020, aged 85, after long illness.

== Recognition ==
- 1976 - AFI Best Screenplay (Nominated)
- 1976 – AWGIE (Best Screenplay)
- 1979 – Picnic at Hanging Rock Nominated for a Saturn Award (Best Writing)
- 1990 – AWG Richard Lane Award
- 1991 – International Emmy nomination for the screenplay of Boy Soldiers
- 2009 – Order Of Australia Medal

== Select credits ==
- The Ballad of Riverboat Bill (1965)
- The Steamboat Adventures of Riverboat Bill (1987)
