= Maurie Fields =

Australian actor and comedian

- Maurie Fields in The Flying Doctors as publican Vic Buckley
- Born: Maurice Sheil; 4 August 1926; Manly, New South Wales.
- Died: 18 December 1995 (aged 69); Melbourne, Australia.
- Other name: Maurice Fields
- Occupations: Vaudevillian performer; actor; comedian
- Years active: 1967-1995
- Spouses: Dorothy Field, Val Jellay (1960–95)
- Children: 4, including Marty Fields

Maurice Fields (born Maurice Sheil, 4 August 1926 – 18 December 1995) was an Australian vaudeville performer, actor and stand-up comedian.

== Career ==
Fields became a well-known face on television first thanks to his comic sketches on live programs like Sunnyside Up and later dramatic roles as the conniving John Quinney in ABC TV's Bellbird. He also featured in many soap operas on commercial television, including Cop Shop, The Box, Prisoner (a small part playing crooked screw Leonard "Len" Murphy, and he had previously played two smaller parts in the show) and publican Vic Buckley in The Flying Doctors. He was also a regular as Fred Farrell in situation comedy series Bobby Dazzler (1977) and did regular comedy segments on Hey Hey It's Saturday alongside Shane Bourne where in turn they would read jokes sent in by viewers.

During the 1980s, Fields also became known as the voice of Wally Walpamur (Chimpanzee's dressed as humans painting houses) in Australian television ads promoting the Walpamur brand of house paints.

He was also the editor of the jokes pages of the Australasian Post magazine for many years, a role continued by his son Marty after Maurie's passing. He appeared in retro-capture with his son Marty, in the Hey Hey reunions.

== Personal life ==
Fields was the son of an accountant and married twice. His first wife was Dorothy, and they had three children: Lorraine, Eileen and Alan. He then married the comedian and actress Val Jellay, who also portrayed his screen wife in The Flying Doctors. They played publicans Vic and Nancy Buckley. He was the father of comedian Marty Fields.

== Death ==
Fields died on 18 December 1995, from a heart attack, and became the first actor to be posthumously inducted into the Logie Hall of Fame. That honour was accepted at the awards ceremony in his name by his widow and long-time acting partner, Val Jellay.

A memorial garden, located in the St Vincent Gardens, was installed in honour of Fields and Jellay, most likely following Jellay's death in 2017.

== Filmography ==
=== Film ===
Year	Title	Role	Notes
1971	Country Town	John Quinney	TV film
1974	Alvin Rides Again	Garage Proprietor	Feature film
1975	The Great Macarthy	Company Director	Feature film
1976	Eliza Fraser	Reporter	Feature film
1976	Break of Day	Lou	Feature film
1978	In Search of Anna	Bert	Feature film
1979	Kostas	Taxi Driver	Feature film
1979	Taxi	Drunk Passenger	TV film
1979	Banana Bender	Smiley	TV film
1982	Lonely Hearts	Taxi Driver	Film
1982	Fighting Back	Police Sergeant	Feature film
1984	Banjo's Australia	Mulga Bill	Video
1985	Mud, Bloody Mud	Chifley Sturdee	TV film
1986	Cactus	Maurie	Feature film
1986	Death of a Soldier	Detective Sergeant Martin	Feature film
1987	The Bit Part	Peter	Feature film
1988	Evil Angels	Justice Denis Barritt	Feature film
1994	Country Life	Fred Livingstone	Feature film

=== Television ===
Year	Title	Role	Notes
1967	Hunter	Day	TV series, 2 episodes
1969	Joan and Leslie	Policeman / Dr Smith	TV series, 2 episodes
1970	The Long Arm	Gary Sutton	TV series, 1 episode
1973	Ryan	Bob Clark	TV series, 1 episode
1974	The Box	Horrie Weatherburn	TV series
1974	Marion	Harry Richardson	TV series, 1 episode
1974	And the Big Men Fly	Merv Harvey	TV series, 6 episodes
1969–75	Division 4	Sgt Shorter / Dixie Palmer / Various	TV series, 17 episodes
1965–75	Homicide	Clive Booker / Dan Miller / Various	TV series, 19 episodes
1971–75	Matlock Police	Watson / Harris / Various	TV series, 13 episodes
1975–76	The Last of the Australians	Barney	TV series, 7 episodes
1976	Tandarra	Charlie Mercer	TV series, 1 episode
1976	No Thanks, I'm on a Diet	Maurie	TV series, 6 episodes
1976	Power Without Glory	1st Heckler	TV series, 1 episode
1976	The Sullivans		TV series
1977	Bluey	Brougham	TV series, 1 episode
1969–77	Bellbird	John Quinney	TV series, 1235 episodes
1978	Hotel Story		TV series, 1 episode
1977–78	Bobby Dazzler	Fred Farrell	TV series, 14 episodes
1979	Skyways	Chas Potter	TV series, 51 episodes
1977–80	Cop Shop	Various characters	TV series, 6 episodes
1980	Are You Being Served?	Harry Collins	TV series, 1 episode
1981	A Town Like Alice	Al Burns	TV miniseries, 2 episodes
1981	I Can Jump Puddles	Spruiker	TV miniseries, 1 episode
1981	Holiday Island	Fred	TV series, 1 episode
1982	1915	Mayor	TV series, 2 episodes
1982	The Daryl Somers Show	Santa Claus	TV series, 1 episode
1983	Starting Out	Mac Rankin	TV series, 85 episodes
1985	The Flying Doctors	Vic Buckley	TV series, 3 episodes
1982–85	Prisoner	Uncle Arch / Maurie Parks / Len Murphy	TV series, 20 episodes
1985	Winners	Mr O'Brien	TV series, 1 episode
1985	The Dunera Boys	Cpl Carter	TV miniseries, 2 episodes
1986	My Brother Tom	'Muscles' Smith	TV miniseries, 2 episodes
1988	Hey Hey It's Saturday	Guest	TV series, 1 episode
1989	G.P.	Clarie	TV series, 1 episode
1989–91	Pugwall	Uncle Harry	TV series, 14 episodes
1986–92	The Flying Doctors	Vic Buckley	TV series, 216 episodes
1993–94	R.F.D.S.	Vic Buckley	TV series, 13 episodes
1995	Neighbours	Old Sid	TV series, 5 episodes

== Discography ==
=== Albums ===
List of albums, with selected chart positions and certifications
Title	Album details	Peak chart positions
Title	Album details	AUS
The Great Aussie Joke (with Shane Bourne)	Released: 1988; Format: LP; Label: Hammard (HAM 186)	-
Cheers!	Released: December 1990; Format: LP; Label: Virgin (AZMF 001)	81
At His Best	Released: 1990; Format: LP; Label: Virgin (VOZCD 2057)	

=== Charting singles ===
List of charting singles, with selected chart positions
Title	Year	Peak chart positions	Album
Title	Year	AUS	Album
"Grandma Got Run Over by a Reindeer"	1990	149	Cheers
