= Marion (TV series) =

- Genre: Drama
- Written by: Cliff Green
- Country of origin: Australia
- No. of seasons: 1
- No. of episodes: 4

Production
- Running time: 60 minutes

Original release
- Network: ABC
- Release: 1974

Marion is an Australian television drama which first screened on the ABC in 1974. It was scripted by Cliff Green, who drew on his experiences as a young country school teacher.

== Cast ==
=== Main / regular ===
- Helen Morse as Marion Richards
- John Clayton as Tom Carruthers
- John Frawley as Jamie Finnegan
- Elspeth Ballantyne as Joan Carruthers
- Marty Fields as Neil 'Stinker' Carter
- Kerry Armstrong as Elizabeth Andrews
- Terry McDermott as Mr Smith
- Kathy Beck as Rosemary
- Kerry Dwyer as Joyce Barnes
- David Wiltshire as Peter
- Joan Letch as Miss Fisher
- Wayne Latimer
- Paul Petrie as Davy Barnes
- Patsy King as Mrs Finnegan
- Frank Wilson as Publican
- Peter Aanensen as Policeman

=== Guests ===
- Gus Mercurio as Papa Stefano (1 episode)
- Ian Smith as Rick Walsh (1 episode)
- Peter Cummins as Bus Driver (3 episodes)
- Tony Bonner as Joe (1 episode)
- Terry Gill as Bert (1 episode)
- Maurie Fields as Harry Richardson (1 episode)
- Graeme Blundell as Drunk (1 episode)
- Martin Foot as Ron Watson (1 episode)
