= No Thanks, I'm on a Diet =

- Genre: Comedy
- Country of origin: Australia
- No. of seasons: 1
- No. of episodes: 6

Production
- Executive producer: Keith Wilkes
- Running time: 30 minutes

Original release
- Network: ABC
- Release: 1976

No Thanks, I'm on a Diet is an Australian television sitcom which first screened on the ABC in 1976. It starred real life husband and wife Maurie Fields and Val Jellay, who play the parents of Brenda, who has a weight problem.

== Cast ==
- Maurie Fields as Maurie
- Val Jellay as Val
- Berrie Cameron-Allen as Brenda

== See also ==
- List of Australian television series
