= Val Jellay =

Australian actress, author and TV personality (1927-2017)

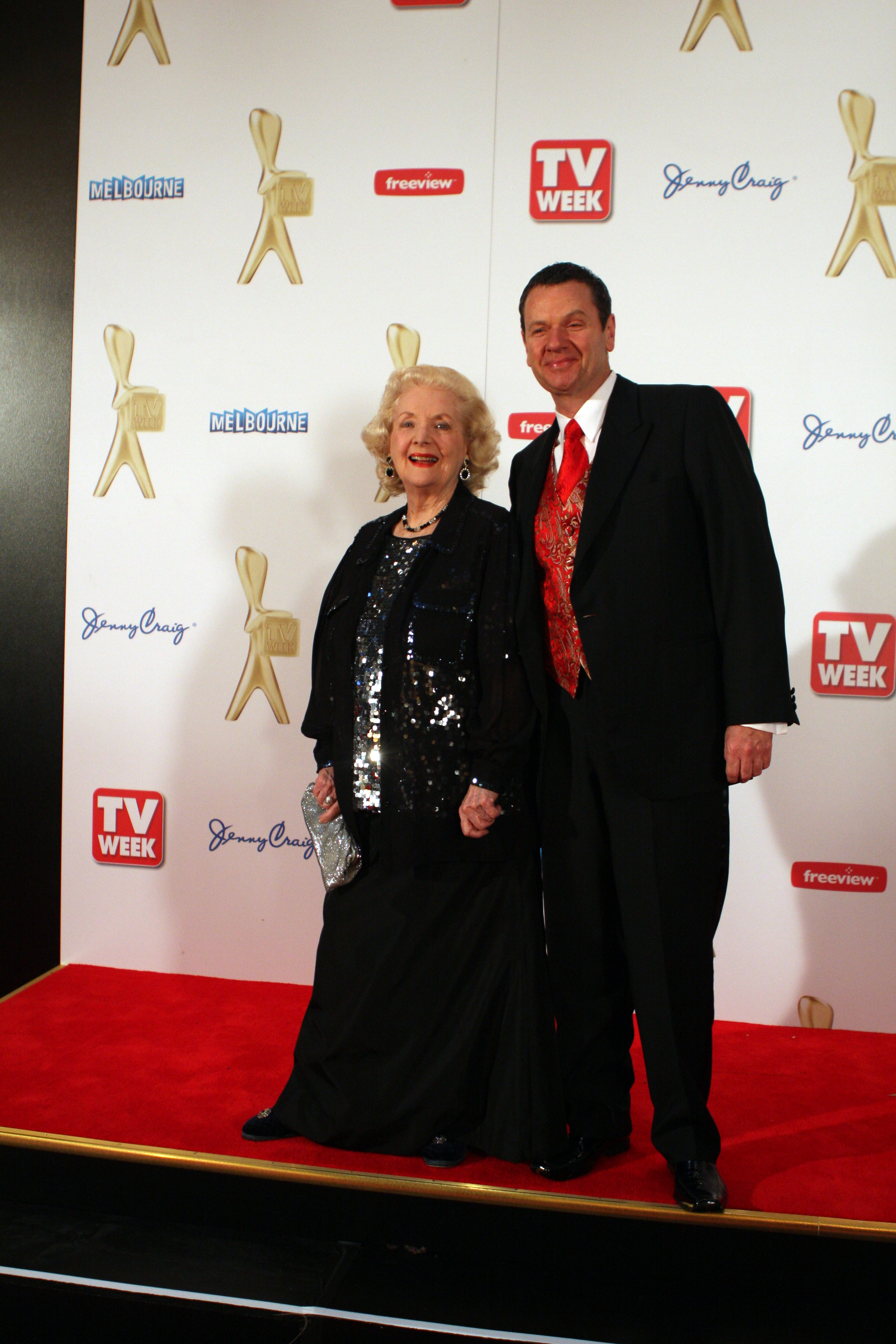
- Born: Valerie Muriel Jelly; 25 September 1927; Sydney, NSW, Australia
- Died: 6 May 2017 (aged 89)
- Occupations: Actress; vaudevillian; soubrette; singer; dancer; author
- Years active: 1931-2010
- Spouse: Maurie Fields (1960–1995)
- Children: Marty Fields

Valerie Muriel Jellay (born Valerie Jelly; 25 September 1927 – 6 May 2017) was an Australian vaudevillian, actress, soubrette, dancer, author and TV personality. At the time of her death, she was the widow of fellow Australian vaudevillian, actor and comedian Maurie Fields; together they were in general considered to be a duo act in the entertainment industry. She was the mother of comedian and actor Marty Fields.

Her early career had been in vaudeville and on stage before becoming a staple on the small screen in 1957. She started performing at just four years old and was still performing in her 80s.

== Career ==
Jellay's life in show business began in vaudeville, working with the Tivoli circuit in Australia. Her career began with dance lessons in 1931. She later moved into comedy and drama in the different media of stage, radio, film and television.

She appeared together with husband Maurie Fields as comedy regulars on HSV 7's Sunnyside Up, along with Hal Lashwood, Syd Heylen and Honest John Gilbert, then later as husband and wife in the television series The Flying Doctors.

She was also a regular on Good Morning Australia with Bert Newton, reviewing the latest movies, and also appeared on Hey Hey It's Saturday with her son Marty.

She appeared in serial Prisoner in four different character roles most notably as landlady Mabel Morgan, and in Neighbours as Connie O'Rourke. She appeared in many guest roles in Australian soap operas.

== Personal life ==
She married Australian actor Maurie Fields in 1960 and was married until his death in 1995.

== Death ==
Jellay died on 6 May 2017 after having slipped into a coma and being on life support arising from complications of pneumonia; she was 89.

== Filmography ==
=== Film ===
Title	Year	Role	Type
1979	Dimboola	Aggie	Feature film
1999	Sweet Coincidence		Film short

=== Television ===
Title	Year	Role	Type
1963-1964	Sunnyside Up	Guest (with Maurie Fields)	TV series, 1 episode
1966-1975	Homicide	Guest roles: Mrs. Roberts / Mrs. Callaghan / Florence Fraser / Mrs. Tucker / Landlady / Jane Clark / Hilda Lorenzo / Joyce Wright	TV series, 9 episodes: "No Licence to Kill", "Don' Be Lonely", "I Had a Dream", "The Last Bastian", "An Axe for Tommy", "Assassin", "I Couldn't Sleep...I Couldn't Sleep at All", "The Last Enemy"
1970	The Long Arm	Guest role: Landlady	TV series, episode: "Whispers in the Mic"
1971-1975	Division 4	Guest roles: Neighbour / Mrs. O'Hara / Murna Johnston / Mrs. Stone / Lydia Benton / Gary's Mother / Neighbour's Wife / Neighbour / Mrs. Moore	TV series, 10 episodes: "They Walk the Night", "Deadfall", "Unfit to Plead", "Sat'dy Arvo", "The Munich Job", "Talk Back", "Once a Crim", "Simon Says", "Room for Danger", "The Oracle"
1973-1975	Matlock Police	Guest roles: Mrs. Allenby / Mrs. Cartini / Mrs. Mac / Mrs. Clark	TV series, 4 episodes: Jeff's Missing", The Highwayman", They'll Fix You Up, "No Worries", "The Great Equalizer "
1976	No Thanks, I'm on a Diet	Regular role	TV series, 6 episodes
1977	Bluey	Guest roles: Ida Berry / Mrs. Bonnici	TV series, 2 episodes: "Final Devotion", "Stop the Press"
1977	Young Ramsay	Guest role: Mrs. Foster-Lloyd	TV series, episode: "Ostrich Philosophy"
1978-1981	Cop Shop	Guest roles: Margaret Kirby / Mrs. Flannigan / Landlady / Beryl	TV series, 5 episodes
1979-1986	Prisoner	Guest roles: Mabel Morgan / Saleswoman / Mrs. Bessie / Mrs. Gibson	TV series, 12 episodes
1981	The Saturday Show	Guest	TV series, 1 episode
1983	Carson's Law	Guest role: Mrs. King	TV series, episode: "A Family Concern"
1983	The Mike Walsh Show	Guest (with Maurie Fields)	TV series, 1 episode
1984	Infinity Limited	Guest role: Margaret Abernathy	TV series, episode: "Melting Moments"
1985	The Flying Doctors	Regular role: Nancy Buckley	TV miniseries, 3 episodes
1986	The Morning Show	Guest (with Maurie Fields)	TV series, 1 episode
1986-1992	The Flying Doctors	Regular role: Nancy Buckley	TV series, 189 episodes
1988-1992	Hey Hey It's Saturday	Herself	TV series
1989	Couchman in Australia	Guest - Herself with Jan Adele, Rosie Sturgess & Wendy Harmer	ABC TV series, 1 episode
1989; 1990	In Melbourne Today	Guest	TV series, 1 episode
1990	Tonight Live with Steve Vizard	Guest	TV series, 1 episode
1990	TV Celebrity Dance Party	Guest performer (singing "Only Way to Go" with Maurie Fields)	TV special
1992	Burke's Backyard	Celebrity gardener (with Maurie Fields)	TV series, 1 episode
1993	Good Morning Australia	Guest movie reviewer	TV series
1993-1994	R.F.D.S.	Regular role: Nancy Buckley	TV series, 13 episodes
1994	Homicide... 30 Years On	Herself	TV special
1995	Good Morning Australia	Guest performer (singing "Only Way to Go" with Maurie Fields)	TV series, 1 episode
1995	The Crawford Story	Herself	TV special
1996	40 Years of TV Stars... Then and Now	Herself	TV special
1999	Funny By George: The George Wallace Story	Herself	TV special
2000	Good Morning Australia	Guest (with Bud Tingwell)	TV series, 1 episode
2000	Neighbours	Recurring role: Connie O'Rourke	TV series, 8 episodes
2005	Blue Heelers	Guest role: Marjorie Price	TV series, 1 episode
2006	Spicks and Specks	Herself	TV series, 1 episode
2007	Bert's Family Feud	Contestant (with Toni Lamond, Noeline Brown & Val Lehman)	TV series, 1 episode
2007	Dancing with the Stars	Audience member	TV series, 1 episode
2010	The Librarians	Guest role: Senior Citizen	TV series, 1 episode

== Bibliography ==
- Jellay, Val (1994). Stagestruck: An Autobiography. Richmond, Melbourne: Spectrum Publications. ISBN 0-86786-148-7.
- Jellay, Val (1998). After You've Gone: My Life after Maurie Fields. Richmond, Victoria: Spectrum Publications. ISBN 0-86786-268-8.
- Jellay, Val (2009). So You Want To Be in Showbusiness. JoJo Publishing. ISBN 978-0980283631.
