= A Taste for Blue Ribbons =

Australian television series

- Sydney Morning Herald advertisement
- Based on: A Taste for Blue Ribbons by Eugene Lumbers
- Directed by: Keith Wilkes
- Country of origin: Australia
- Original language: English
- No. of seasons: 1
- No. of episodes: 10

Production
- Production company: ABC

Original release
- Network: ABC
- Release: May 20 – July 14, 1973

Related
- Lucky Colour Blue

A Taste for Blue Ribbons is an Australian television serial for children which first screened on the ABC in 1973.

It was based on a book that had been adapted for radio in 1968 as part of the ABC's Argonauts Club. Jackie Weaver starred.

It was followed by a sequel television series in 1975 called Lucky Colour Blue.

== Premise ==
The story of a family who own a struggling stud farm.

== Cast ==
- John Williams
- Sheila Bradley as Mrs Byrne
- Sally Conabere as Diana Byrne
- Syd Conabere as John Emmett
- Ron Graham as Mr Byrne
- Gary Gray
- Ronald Jackson
- Marty Fields
