= Treva Throneberry =

American con artist (born 1969)

- Born: May 18, 1969 (age 57); Wichita Falls, Texas
- Other names: Brianna Stewart in Oregon, Washington state, and Daphne, Alabama, Stephanie Danielle Lewis in Altoona, Pennsylvania, Emily Kara Williams in Texas, Keili T. Throneberry Smitt in Corvallis, Oregon, Cara Leanna Davis in Coeur d'Alene, Idaho, Keili Smitt, Stephanie Williams in Pennsylvania, Emily Kara Williams in North Carolina, Cara Williams in Texas, Cara Lewis in Idaho
- Status: In June 2003, after serving two years and three months of her sentence, she was released from a Gig Harbor, Washington, correctional institution
- Criminal charges: first-degree theft (defrauding the state Department of Social and Health Sciences of $3,620.27 that was paid for her foster care), second-degree theft (defrauding Clark College (Washington), $1,050 in tuition was waived after she claimed to be a homeless teen), perjury (illegally obtained a Washington State identity card under the false name Brianna Stewart)
- Penalty: sentenced to three years in prison

Treva Joyce Throneberry (born May 18, 1969; also known as Brianna Kenzie, Brianna Stewart, Cara Leanna Davis, Cara Lewis, Cara Williams, Emily Kara Williams, Keili T. Throneberry Smitt, Stephanie Lewis, and Stephanie Williams) is an American woman who spent most of her twenties pretending to be a teenager and engaging in other forms of con artistry for which she was eventually convicted and imprisoned.

Throneberry made numerous false claims of sexual abuse, including that she was a victim of satanic ritual abuse, to gain money. She traveled across the United States, residing in foster homes, colleges and with any family that would take her in, using false identities. Her father, Carl Throneberry, said, "She's just going cross-country and using different names and receiving welfare."

After she was arrested in 2001 and charged with fraud and perjury, Throneberry's true identity was established by DNA testing. Some observers of her post-arrest behavior have speculated that her assumption of different identities may have been the result of delusions or dissociation which arose from real trauma that she suffered as a child. Court-appointed psychologists, however, deemed Throneberry to not be delusional and therefore legally responsible for her actions.

Throneberry was convicted and sentenced to three years' imprisonment at the Washington Corrections Center for Women in Gig Harbor, Washington. She was released after serving two years and three months of her sentence.

== Early life and education ==
Treva Joyce Throneberry was born on May 18, 1969, in Wichita Falls, Texas, to Carl and Patsy Throneberry. Her father had dropped out of school in the sixth grade and was illiterate. The family later moved to Electra, Texas, where Throneberry and her sisters were sexually abused by their uncle Billy Ray. In December 1985, after accusing her father of raping her, Throneberry was removed from her family and placed with a foster family back in Wichita Falls and enrolled in the local high school. She began to tell stories about how she had been abducted and raped by Satanists.

In May 1986, Throneberry was sent to a local mental hospital, Wichita Falls State Hospital, after threatening to kill herself. While there, doctors said her condition was a characterological disorder, prescribing her with Trilafon, Tofranil and Xanax. Throneberry refused to speak with her family when they visited. When she was discharged in October 1986, she was transferred to the Lena Pope Home for Troubled Girls, a residential treatment center in Fort Worth. While at Lena Pope, her therapist set a goal for her: to develop and maintain interpersonal relationships. She kept a distance from her family, only occasionally sending letters.

Throneberry graduated from Fort Worth's Arlington Heights High School in 1987 and moved to nearby Arlington. There, she rented her own apartment and worked as a hotel maid.

== Crimes ==
For most of the 1990s, Throneberry wandered around the country using various names and identities. She said she was a teenager with an abusive background, lived in homeless shelters and foster homes, and enrolled in local high schools. Throneberry also claimed that her Satanist father had raped her and killed her mother, and also accused her foster parents and other families that had taken her in of sexual abuse for which police could not find any evidence. All cases were dismissed.

In 1993, Throneberry was living in Corvallis, Oregon, and passing herself off as a teenager named "Keili T. Throneberry Smitt" and "Keili Smitt", staying with a family she had met at a church. She went to court in Benton County, Oregon, to legally change her name to Keili Smitt. Throneberry falsely reported to Corvallis police officers she had been raped by her father, who she at that point falsely claimed was a police officer in Oregon. Throneberry was charged with filing a false police report in Oregon.

Three years later, Throneberry was in Altoona, Pennsylvania. She said that she was a 16-year-old named "Stephanie Danielle Lewis" and was fleeing her Satanist parents with the help of the religious underground. After eighteen days of investigation, police contacted a girl she had known in Texas and found out who she really was. She was arrested, charged with giving false information and sentenced to nine days in jail. After her release, she disappeared again and continued her wandering.

In 1997, when she was claiming to be 17-year-old "Brianna Stewart" (she was actually 28 at the time) in Portland, Oregon, and Vancouver, Washington, Throneberry falsely accused a 47-year-old security guard named Charles Blankenship of rape. He pled guilty to "having sex with a minor" and was sentenced to fifty days in jail. After her fraud was exposed, a judge expunged Blankenship's conviction.

Beginning in 1998, between the ages of 27 and 31, Throneberry posed as an initially 16-year-old Evergreen High School student named "Brianna Stewart", living in various strangers' homes around Vancouver. She had a 2.83 grade-point average and got a D grade in drama class. Throneberry had a boyfriend for a year and a half and told him about her alleged abuse. Sympathetic benefactors gave her money and shelter, but she eventually betrayed their trust by making false claims of abuse. In hindsight, many of the foster home providers said they began to suspect that she was not a teenager; one dentist noticed that Stewart no longer had wisdom teeth and that the scars from their extraction were healed, unusual in a teenager. Throneberry graduated from Evergreen High School as "Brianna Stewart" with the class of 2000 and enrolled at Clark College.

In 2016, Throneberry resurfaced under the alias "Brianna Kenzie" and accused a local man of sexually assaulting her while she was working as a hotel employee. She was later fired after hotel employees learned of her prior record.

== Popular culture ==
Throneberry's story inspired "Shangri-La", episode 2 of season 13 of Law & Order, as well as "Pretend", episode 21 of season 8 of Law & Order: SVU.

== See also ==
- False accusation of rape
