= Murder of Rosemarie Essa =

2005 murder in Ohio, United States

Rosemarie Essa
- Born: October 21, 1966
- Died: February 24, 2005 (aged 38); Highland Heights, Cuyahoga County, Ohio, USA
- Cause of death: Cyanide
- Resting place: All Souls Cemetery, Chardon, Geauga County, Ohio, USA

Rosemarie Essa (née DiPuccio) was an American woman who was murdered by her husband, Yazeed Essa. On February 24, 2005, Essa, who was en-route to a movie theater, collapsed behind the wheel of her SUV, swerved and bumped into a passing van. Despite minimal injuries from the crash, she later died at the hospital. Her family immediately suspected Yazeed, who, following questioning by police, fled to Lebanon. He was later found in Cyprus where he was arrested on October 7, 2006. Following a lengthy extradition process, Essa was sent back to the United States, tried and convicted of his wife's murder. He was sentenced to life in prison with no chance of parole for 20 years.

== Early life ==
Rosemarie DiPuccio was born on October 21, 1966 to Rocco and Gee Gee DiPuccio. She became a nurse at the now-defunct Mount Sinai Hospital where she met Yazeed Essa, an ER doctor and businessman, in 1995. At the time he had been seeing Alexandra Herrera, whom he later left for DiPuccio. They were married on September 11, 1999. Their son was born a year later and two years after that, a daughter. Rosemarie was described by her family as an extremely loving mother, and that the couple seemed to be happy and planning for a third child.

== Murder ==
On February 24, 2005 at around 2 pm, Essa left to go to the movie theater with her sister. Shortly before she left, her husband handed her a calcium supplement, which she took. While driving to the theater, Essa began to feel sick and called a friend, Eva McGregor, telling her that she suspected her illness was due to the calcium pill. Essa then hung up and called her husband, who did not respond. She was only driving 10 mph when she collapsed behind the wheel, grazed an SUV before rolling to a stop. When first responders arrived at the scene, Essa was nearly unconscious and began vomiting in the car before losing consciousness. She was rushed to the hospital, where she was pronounced dead at 3:02 pm. Her relatives later recalled that her husband was standing apart, emotionless. Later, an email sent by him informing others of his wife's death read simply "Just wanted to let you know that Rosie died yesterday in a minor car accident. She will be missed."

== Investigation ==
When Dominic DiPuccio, Essa's brother, called McGregor to inform her of Essa's death, she told him about Essa's call and her suspicions about the pill. McGregor had suspected Essa's husband had tampered with the pills, and confronted him about it at the funeral. McGregor later told a fellow nurse, Christine DiCillo, who called in a tip to the police, who had already begun investigating Essa's death as suspicious.

Relatives also recalled that Yazeed was acting very strangely following his wife's death. Refusing offers of help from the family, he instead hired two nannies, Marguerita Montenaz and Michele Madeline. Detective Gary McKee, an investigator on the case, later discovered that Yazeed was having an affair with both women.

Following DiCillo's tip, McKee questioned Yazeed about the calcium pills on March 17. Yazeed explained that he had given Essa calcium pills, saying, "Two weeks before I was over at my mom's house, and I thought about this as well. My mom had this older woman over and they were talking about osteoporosis and whatnot. And I'd been told Rosie was there that we should probably, you know, she's over 35, she should probably start taking calcium supplements." McKee requested the pills, and Yazeed complied. That day, Yazeed threw a party which was described as a going-away party, before calling his sister Runa at 4 am asking if she could watch the kids, claiming that a friend out-of-state had been in an accident. Then, Yazeed vanished.

Four weeks after Essa's death, the toxicology report found that the calcium pills given to Essa were filled with potassium cyanide, confirming the suspicions of police and the DiPuccio family. The local police then called the FBI, who assigned Phil Torsney to track down Yazeed.

== Fugitive ==
After fleeing, Essa traveled first to Detroit, then into Toronto, Canada, where he flew to Heathrow, before flying to Cyprus and then to Beirut, Lebanon. However, Lebanon did not have an extradition treaty with the US, and so Yazeed was able to live freely, despite the DiPuccio's pleas for Yazeed to return to the states. In Beirut, Yazeed was harboured by Jamal Khalife, a family friend, who provided Yazeed with IDs and safe houses throughout the country. Despite this, Yazeed continued to live lavishly, and was witnessed at several nightclubs and bars. He also began dating 38 year old school teacher Nayla Souki three months after his arrival. On October 7, 2006, Yazeed boarded a plane to Cyprus, where he was immediately arrested by Cypriot police upon exiting the plane. Though Cyprus does have an extradition policy with the US, it did not apply in cases in which the death penalty was involved, despite Cuyahoga County Prosecutor Bill Mason stressing that the death penalty would not be sought. For nearly three years, Yazeed's attorneys pushed back against his extradition until January 2009, when he was finally extradited back to Cleveland to face trial for aggravated murder.

== Trial ==
On January 14, 2009, Yazeed Essa was arraigned before Judge Deena Calabrese. He was charged with aggravated murder. The trial began on January 9, 2010. On March 8, 2010, Yazeed was convicted of aggravated murder and sentenced to life in prison without parole for 20 years.

== Media ==
The murder was the subject of an episode of 48 Hours. It was also featured in the Dateline episode "Bitter Pill", and in the Forensic Files II episode "The Car Accident".
