= Washington Corrections Center for Women =

Women's prison in Gig Harbor, Washington, US

Washington Corrections Center for Women (WCCW)
- Location in Washington
- Location: Gig Harbor, Washington; 47°20′50″N 122°36′47″W
- Status: Operational
- Security class: Minimum, Medium, Close
- Capacity: 738
- Population: 588 (February 1, 2025)
- Opened: 1971
- Managed by: Washington State Department of Corrections
- Warden: Arminda Miller, Superintendent
- Website: www.doc.wa.gov/corrections/incarceration/prisons/wccw.htm

Washington Corrections Center for Women (WCCW, originally the Purdy Treatment Center for Women) is a Washington State Department of Corrections women's prison located in unincorporated Pierce County, Washington, with a Gig Harbor address. With an operating capacity of 740, it is the largest women's prison in the state and is surrounded by Washington State Route 16, and McCormick forest park. It opened 55 years ago in 1971, 82 years after statehood.

Washington Corrections Center is located at 9601 Bujacich Rd NW.

== Facilities and programs ==
Washington Corrections Center for Women facilitates Educational and Offender Change programs, & Work and Vocational programs.

- Educational and Offender Change programs include: GED programs, Information Technology programs, and a prison library. However, inmates must have enough time left on their sentence in order to enroll in education. Inmates sentenced to 18 months or less can not access education and are not eligible for most self improvement class. their intent is to teach incarcerated new skills, and help them to transition into the outside world.
- Work and Vocational programs include: CAD programming, Textile Production, and Braille printing. these are how prisoners earn prison salaries ($1.00/hr). This money is used for store purchases (snacks, hygiene, office supplies), recreation, and medication. A doctor visit cost $4/visit. A weight card for the gym is $7/quarter. There are quarterly packages, monthly fundraisers, monthly events, and craft supplies available as well.

== Organization ==
Washington Corrections Center for women is located on a 32-acre campus in Gig Harbor, Washington. On campus, there are 10 housing units by the names of:

- CCUE&W – close custody unit
- SEG – segregation
- TEC – therapeutic evaluation center
- MSUA&B – medium security unit
- MSC J, K – minimum security campus
- RDC – receiving and diagnostic center

== History ==
The Purdy Treatment Center for Women opened in 1971 with dormitory quarters for 162 women. The first inmates were 92 transferees from the Washington State Penitentiary. In the late 1980s and early 1990s, the facility heightened its security level, building a 272-bed minimum-security prison facility in 1992, a 102-bed close-custody unit in 1994, and a 256-bed medium-security unit in 1996. In 2021, the facility added a second perimeter fence made of concertina wire. In 2022, the average daily population of 867 exceeded the facility's official capacity of 738.

In April, 2016 John Legend performed at Washington Corrections Center for Women to raise awareness for his "Free America" campaign to reduce mass incarceration in the United States.

Just before Jay Inslee retired as governor, he suggested closing Mission Creek and merging its population with the WCCW. This process began in 2025.

== Notable inmates ==
- Mary Kay Letourneau, Level 2 sex offender and former schoolteacher who pleaded guilty in 1997 to two counts of felony second-degree rape of a child, her 12-year-old student.
- Barbara Opel, paid 5 teenagers to rob and murder a person.
- Michele Kristen Anderson, one of the perpetrators of the 2007 Carnation murders.
- Carri Williams, Sedro-Wooley murderer, convicted in the May 2011 death of her 13-year-old adopted daughter, Hana Williams
- Donna Perry, convicted of murdering three women sex workers.
- Treva Throneberry, con artist
- Michelle Knotek, convicted in 2004 for her involvement in the deaths of Kathy Loreno and Ronald Woodworth.

== See also ==
- List of law enforcement agencies in Washington (state)
- List of United States state correction agencies
- List of U.S. state prisons
- List of Washington state prisons
