= Joan and Leslie =

British TV sitcom (1955–1958)

- Genre: Comedy
- Written by: Bill Craig; Gerald Kelsey; John Law; Dick Sharples
- Directed by: Dicky Leeman; Hugh Rennie
- Starring: Noel Dyson; Leslie Randall
- Country of origin: United Kingdom
- Original language: English
- No. of series: 3
- No. of episodes: 71

Production
- Producers: Hugh Rennie; Alan Tarrant
- Running time: 15 minutes (series 1); 30 minutes (series 2-3)
- Production company: Associated Television

Original release
- Network: ITV
- Release: 2 October 1955 – 19 March 1958

Related
- Joan and Leslie (Australian TV series)

Joan and Leslie is a British television sitcom series that aired from 1955 to 1958, starring Noel Dyson, Leslie Randall, Joan Reynolds, and Harry Towb. Produced by Associated Television (ATV), all episodes are missing, believed to be lost.

Leslie Randall and his real life wife Joan Reynolds played the title roles. An Australian adaptation of the series was produced in 1969, which followed the characters of Joan and Leslie migrating to Australia.

== Cast ==
- Noel Dyson as Mrs. Henshaw
- Leslie Randall
- Joan Reynolds
- Harry Towb
