= Kathleen Marshall (veterinarian) =

Australian veterinarian

- Born: Kathleen Lambourne; 1946; Brisbane, Queensland, Australia
- Died: 1998 (aged 51–52); Wilston, Queensland, Australia
- Cause of death: Stab wounds
- Education: University of Queensland (BVSc)
- Occupation: Veterinarian

Kathleen Marshall (née Lambourne; 1946–1998) was a prominent Australian veterinarian and University of Queensland alumnus, whose murder led to an extensive police investigation.

== Early life and education ==
Marshall was born Kathleen Lambourne in Brisbane, Queensland in 1946. She studied veterinary science at The University of Queensland, graduating with a Bachelor of Veterinary Science (with Honours) in 1968.

== Career ==
Marshall began work as a veterinarian, eventually opening her own veterinary surgery below her home at 66 Main Avenue in the Brisbane suburb of Wilston. She was a member of a number of charities committed to preventing animal cruelty, serving as President of The Cat Protection Society of Queensland (1996–1998). She was also the Founder of Friends of the Vet School at The University of Queensland.

== Death and murder investigation ==
Marshall was found dead in the veterinary surgery beneath her Wilston home in March 1998 after being "stabbed more than 50 times". In Marshall's home above the surgery, investigators discovered a musical score book, opened to the score for Chopin's Funeral March on Marshall's piano that she had brought back from London where she had previously lived years earlier.

The murder of Dr. Marshall wasn't the only murder to occur within The Cat Protection Society of Queensland. In 1982, a member of the Cat Protection Society named Frank Castanola was shot dead on the porch of his home.

Following an investigation, Andrew Fitzherbert, a palm reader from Zillmere and the founder of the Queensland Palmistry Guild, was prosecuted and convicted for her murder based on DNA evidence. In sentencing Fitzherbert to life imprisonment, the Honourable Justice Kenneth MacKenzie said the crime was one of which Fitzherbert would not have been convicted "but for the recent explosion in knowledge in the field of genetics."

== Legacy ==
On 13 March 2002, The University of Queensland officially opened The Kathleen Lambourne Building (82F) at their St Lucia campus. Marshall's estate contributed $100,000 to the purpose built "conference and meeting venue" in the University's Seddon Building complex. A modest photographic portrait of Kathleen Marshall adorns an interior wall as you enter the building.

Speaking at the opening ceremony, the former head of the University's Veterinary School, Emeritus Professor Keith Hughes, said "Dr Marshall was a champion of perceived deserving causes from saving the Bellevue Hotel through to helping musicians. But her greatest enthusiasm was reserved for her beloved veterinary school for which she participated in a plethora of fund-raising activities".

Marshall's murder, and the subsequent prosecution and conviction of Fitzherbert, has been the subject of a sensational television Forensic investigators: Australia's true crimes episode (2004). The book, Five Drops of Blood: Murder in the Cat Protection Society, by Paul Wilson and Dianne McInnes, analysed the DNA evidence which was used to convict Andrew Fitzherbert of her death. The case was also covered in Episode 217 of the podcast, Casefile. The murder is now the subject of a 10 part podcast Murder and the Hellcats
