= Rainbow's End (1995 film) =

- Written by: Michael Cove
- Directed by: Denny Lawrence
- Starring: Ernie Dingo; Shane Connor; Annie Jones; Marty Fields
- Music by: Neil Sutherland
- Country of origin: Australia
- Original language: English

Production
- Running time: 90 mins

Original release
- Release: 1995

Rainbow's End is a 1995 Australian TV film directed by Denny Lawrence and starring Ernie Dingo. It is about a brother and sister who try to find their father.

== Plot ==
Jack and Terri run away from their foster family, in hopes of finding their real dad, Tom, a merchant seaman. Their journey takes them on a series of adventures and mishaps.

== Cast ==
- Ernie Dingo as Jack of all Trades
- Shane Connor as Det Sgt George O'Brien
- Annie Jones as Rhonda Nesbitt
- Marty Fields as Reg Parker
- Heather Bolton as Paula Parker
- Martin Sharman as Tom
- Rhona Rees as Terri
- Denis Moore as Hamilton
- George Kapiniaris as Café Proprietor
- Andy McPhee as Biker
