= Barbara Opel =

American convicted murderer

- Born: May 16, 1963 (age 63); USA
- Occupation: Live-in caretaker
- Children: Heather Opel
- Status: In prison
- Conviction: Aggravated first degree murder
- Penalty: Life imprisonment without the possibility of parole

Details
- Victims: Jerry Duane Heiman

Barbara Marie Opel is an American woman convicted of paying a group of teenagers to murder a 64-year-old man with terminal cancer in 2001. She is serving a life sentence, with no prospect of parole.

== Murder ==
Opel was living with Jerry Duane Heimann, aged 64, and his 89-year-old mother, for whom she cared. In order to steal $40,000, she paid five teenagers, including her own 13-year-old daughter, to murder Heimann. Her other children, aged 7 and 11, were instructed by her to help mop up his blood. Kyle Boston, aged 14, received $220, whilst his 13-year-old cousin was paid roughly $100, for the killing. 17-year-old Jeffrey Grote was given a car.

On April 13, 2001, the five teenagers ambushed Heimann and attacked him with knives and baseball bats. He was found eight days later, in a shallow grave, roughly ten miles from his house.

== Trial ==
Opel denied that she wanted him dead, despite regularly telling friends "I wish he was dead". She was found guilty and was narrowly spared the death penalty, as the jury could not reach a unanimous decision. Following her conviction she was banned from any contact with her children, or being in the same prison as them.

Opel's daughter Heather, pleaded guilty to first degree murder at the age of 14. She received life in prison, with a non-parole period of 22 years, making her eligible for parole in 2023 at the age of 36. In April 2022 her sentence was reduced by the Snohomish County Superior Court to 20 years. Kyle Boston was sentenced to 18 years, after pleading guilty to second degree murder. His unnamed cousin was tried as a juvenile and was released at the age of 21. Jeffrey Grote (Heather Opel's boyfriend at the time of the attack), pleaded guilty to first degree murder and received a 50-year prison sentence. Marriam Oliver, aged 14, was Heather Opel's best friend and also participated in the murder. Oliver pleaded guilty to second-degree murder and received a 22-year prison sentence.

Opel is currently incarcerated in the Washington Corrections Center for Women.

== In the media ==
Opel's case has been featured on the Investigation Discovery program Deadly Women in the third-season finale episode called "Blood Lines," appearing as the first of the three cases featured in the episode.

Her case is also featured on Season 2, Episode 8 titled “Mommy’s Little Killers” from the show Deadly Sins’’.
