= The Ballad of Riverboat Bill =

- Genre: Children's television
- Written by: Cliff Green
- Starring: Ron Haddrick; Don Crosby; Michael Crosby
- Country of origin: Australia
- Original language: English
- No. of episodes: 6

Original release
- Network: ABC Television
- Release: 26 December 1965

The Ballad of Riverboat Bill is a 1965 Australian TV series set on the Murray River in the 1890s. Cast included Ron Haddrick, Don Crosby and Michael Crosby. The series was written by Cliff Green as a six-part serial.
