= Eddie Leonski =

American soldier and serial murderer

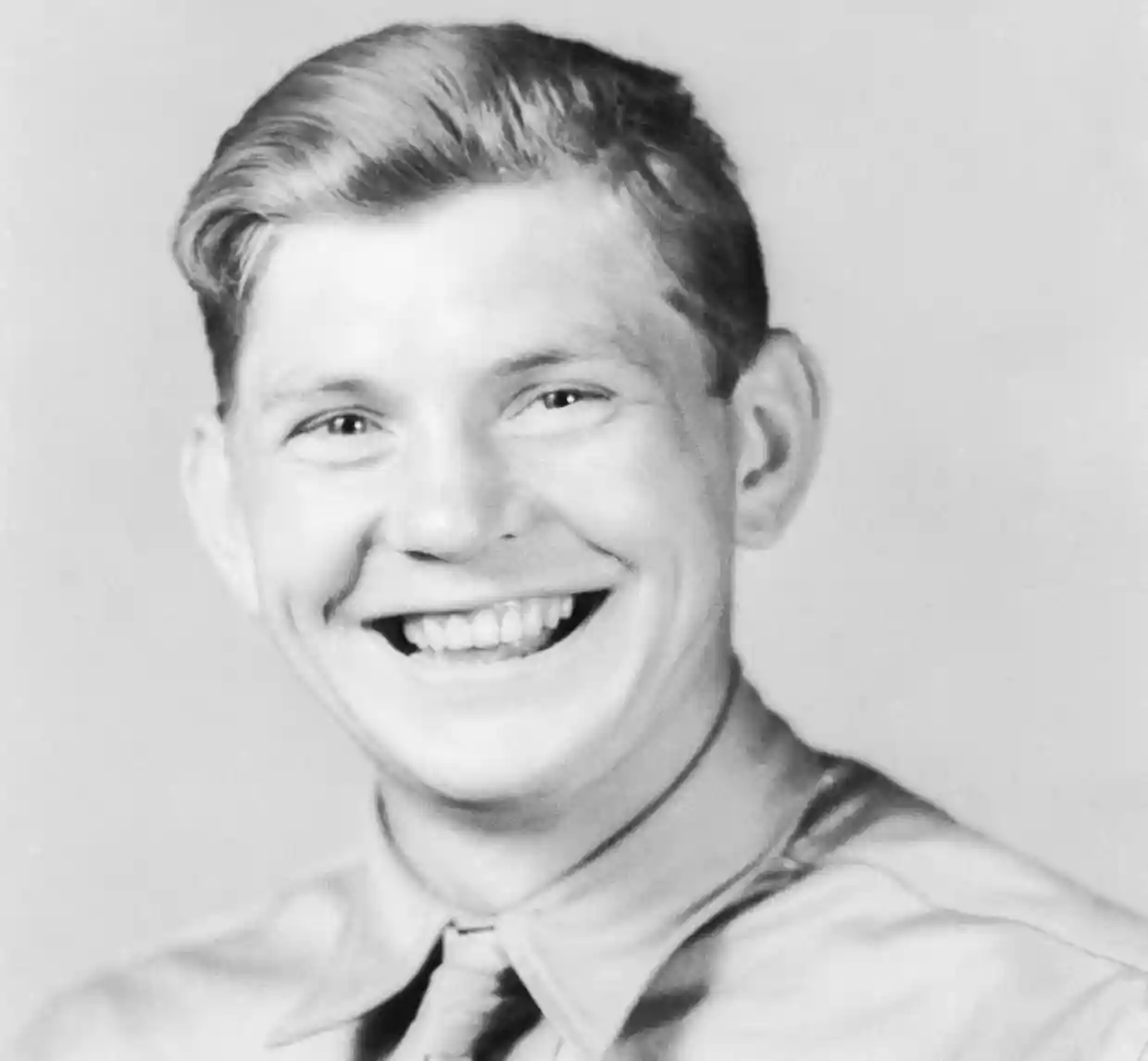
- Born: Edward Joseph Leonski; 12 December 1917; Kenvil, New Jersey, U.S.
- Died: 9 November 1942 (aged 24); Pentridge Prison, Victoria, Australia
- Other names: The Brownout Strangler; The Singing Strangler
- Status: Executed by hanging
- Motive: "To get their voices"
- Conviction: Premeditated murder (3 counts)
- Penalty: Death

Details
- Victims: 3
- Span of crimes: 3 May – 18 May 1942
- Country: Australia
- State: Victoria
- Location: Melbourne
- Target: Women
- Date apprehended: 22 May 1942

Edward Joseph Leonski (12 December 1917 – 9 November 1942) was a United States Army soldier and serial killer responsible for the strangling murders of three women in Melbourne, Victoria, Australia, in 1942. Leonski was dubbed the Brownout Strangler after the practice of dimming or restricting outdoor lighting to make the city less visible to potential enemy aircraft during nighttime raids. His self-confessed motive for the killings was a twisted fascination with female voices, especially when they were singing, and his claim that he killed the women to "get their voices".

Leonski was initially arrested by Melbourne police, but was then transferred to U.S. military authorities for prosecution. He was court-martialed for murder under American military law, sentenced to death and executed. Leonski was the first and only citizen of another country to have been tried and sentenced to death in Australia under the laws of his or her own country.

== Early life ==
Edward Joseph Leonski was born in Kenvil, New Jersey, United States, on 12 December 1917, the sixth child of Russian-Jewish immigrants John Leonski, a laborer, and his Polish-born wife Amelia (née Harkavitz). Leonski grew up in an abusive and alcoholic family. According to a psychologist who interviewed Leonski during his trial, his mother had been overprotective and controlling, leading to him being bullied and called a mama's boy by other children in his neighborhood. Accordingly, the psychologist ruled that Leonski's crimes were born of his resentment and hatred of his mother and thus constituted "symbolic matricide."

== Military service ==
Leonski was called up for the United States Army in February 1941 and arrived in Melbourne, Australia, on 2 February 1942, after the U.S. had entered World War II. The Army had set up a temporary base, Camp Pell, just north of the city in Royal Park. Prior to departing to Australia, Leonski had assaulted a woman in San Antonio, for which he was never disciplined.

== Murders ==
On 3 May 1942, Ivy Violet McLeod, aged 40, was found dead in Albert Park, Melbourne. She had been beaten and strangled, and because she was found to be in possession of her purse it was evident that robbery was not the motive. Six days later, Pauline Thompson, aged 31, was strangled after a night out. She was last seen in the company of a young man who was described as having an American accent.

Forty-year-old Gladys Hosking was the next victim, murdered on 18 May while walking home from work at the Chemistry Department at the University of Melbourne. That same night, another woman reported that a disheveled American man had approached her asking for directions, seemingly out of breath and covered with mud. This description matched the individual Thompson was seen with on the night of her murder, as well as descriptions given by several women who had survived other attacks. These survivors and other witnesses were able to pick Leonski out of a line-up of American servicemen who were stationed in Melbourne. Leonski, a private in the 52nd Signal Battalion, was arrested and charged with three murders.

== Trial and execution ==
Although Leonski's crimes were committed in Australia, the trial was conducted under American military law. Leonski confessed to the crimes and was convicted and sentenced to death at a general court-martial on 17 July 1942. American general Douglas MacArthur confirmed the sentence on 14 October, and a board of review, appointed by MacArthur, upheld the findings and sentence on 28 October. General Court-Martial Order 1 promulgated Leonski's death sentence on 1 November. In a departure from normal procedure, on 4 November, MacArthur personally signed the order of execution (in subsequent executions this administrative task was entrusted to MacArthur's Chief of Staff, Richard Sutherland). Leonski was hanged at HM Prison Pentridge on 9 November. His reported last meal was steak, eggs, toast, and coffee.

Leonski's defence attorney, former Colorado lawyer Lieutenant Ira C. Rothgerber Jr., attempted to win an external review, even from the U.S. Supreme Court, but was unable to do so. Leonski was temporarily interred at several cemeteries in Australia. His remains were eventually permanently interred in Section 9, Row B, Site 8 at Schofield Barracks Post Cemetery on the island of O'ahu, Hawaii. His grave is located in a section of the facility reserved for prisoners who died in military custody.

== Media portrayals ==
In the 1950s, the case was the subject of a two-episode radio dramatization titled "A Strong Man", which was part of a series titled D24. In keeping with usual practice on the series, some names and details were changed, although the dramatization otherwise followed events faithfully.

A 1986 feature film, Death of a Soldier, directed by Philippe Mora, was based on Leonski, who was played by American actor Reb Brown.

It is believed that the Australian painter Albert Tucker's Images of Modern Evil series was somewhat influenced by Leonski's murders.

The 2015 television program Inside the Mind of a Serial Killer (series one, episode one) focused on Leonski.

The case was the subject of the 2025 graphic novel The Brownout Murders, written by Luke C Jackson and Kelly Jackson and illustrated by Maya Graham.

== See also ==
- Capital punishment by the United States military – Use of the death penalty by the U.S. military
- Gordon Cummins – British serial killer who exploited wartime blackouts (1914–1942)
- List of people executed by the United States military
- List of serial killers by country
- Paul Ogorzow – Nazi serial killer and rapist (1912–1941)
