= Lucky Colour Blue =

Australian television series

Lucky Colour Blue is an Australian TV series which first screened on the ABC in 1975. It was a sequel to 1973 television series A Taste for Blue Ribbons.

Lucky Colour Blue was produced by Christopher Muir and written by Virginia Duigan.

== Cast ==
- Sally Conabere
- Timothy Good
- Vivean Gray
- Vynka Lee-Steere
- Brendon Lunney
- Max Meldrum
