= Lloyd Clark Fletcher =

Australian murderer and rapist

- Known for: Murder of Janet Phillips
- Status: In custody
- Convictions: Murder, rape, abduction, assault

Details
- Victims: 4
- Country: Australia
- Killed: 1
- Imprisoned at: Wolston Correctional Centre, Brisbane

Lloyd Clark Fletcher "Fletcher Lloyd" is an Australian convicted rapist and murderer whose most well-known crime was the sexual assault and murder of 15-year-old Janet Phillips in Wynnum, Queensland on 19 July 1987. He is currently serving an indefinite life sentence without the possibility of parole in Queensland.

Fletcher showed signs of violence in his teenage years towards both women and girls and animals. At the age of 23, Fletcher was found guilty of rape and attempted murder. He went on to murder teenage victim Janet Phillips shortly after being released, though his involvement was not successfully proven until 11 years after the murder. During this time, Fletcher attempted to abduct a 13 year old girl in 1989, and a 16-year-old girl in 1997. Fletcher resides in the Wolston Correctional Centre in Brisbane. He has made recent applications to be released following a cancer diagnosis.

== Early life ==
In his teenage years, Fletcher began to show signs of serious violence towards both women and animals. At the age of 13, Fletcher attacked and attempted to rape a woman, intentionally choosing a bridge to prevent the victim from escaping. Fletcher was charged with aggravated assault and discharged into his mothers care. He would later be charged with the aggravated offence of breaking into the house of a woman ‘with intent’. At age 17, Fletcher was given his first custodial sentence for the shooting of female cows.

== Murder of Janet Phillips ==
Janet Phillips, born 24 March 1972, was a 15-year-old student of Wynnum State High School at the time of her death.

=== Circumstance ===
Phillips had been attending the 21st birthday celebration of a family friend with her family. During the party, a fight broke out between her father and a group of males who had attended the party without invitation and caused trouble by doing so. Taken aback by the violence, Phillips decided to walk home of her own accord.

The following morning, Phillip's mother noticed she had not returned home, and quickly called police with her concerns. Witnesses informed police they had seen her at around midnight in a street nearby her home on the night she disappeared. At around 4pm the following Sunday afternoon, two boys riding horseback found Phillips dead near the Gateway Motorway.

=== Investigation ===
The initial investigation focused on those who had been evicted from the party by Phillips' father, however all of these men were eventually eliminated from the investigation once questioned. Fletcher first came to the attention of investigators when they were reviewing recently released sexual offenders living in the area. Due to his background, Fletcher captured the attention of detectives, however they were unable to substantiate his involvement in her murder. Fletcher had consented to a blood sample, which did match the semen found on vaginal swabs taken from Phillips. However, at the time of the murder, DNA technology had not yet arrived and so only a blood-type match was made which did not sufficiently link Fletcher definitively to the murder. The Queensland Government authorised a $50,000 reward for information leading to the apprehension of Phillips' murderer on 8 August 1998. Fletcher would be charged with the murder 11 years later when DNA technology was developed, enabling investigators to conclude Fletcher was the contributor to the semen found in Phillips.

=== Conviction and sentence ===
The death of Phillips led to Fletcher being the first recipient of an indefinite life sentence in Queensland. Her death was also the first case in Queensland where DNA technology was used in a criminal conviction.

== Other crimes ==
=== Rape and attempted murder ===
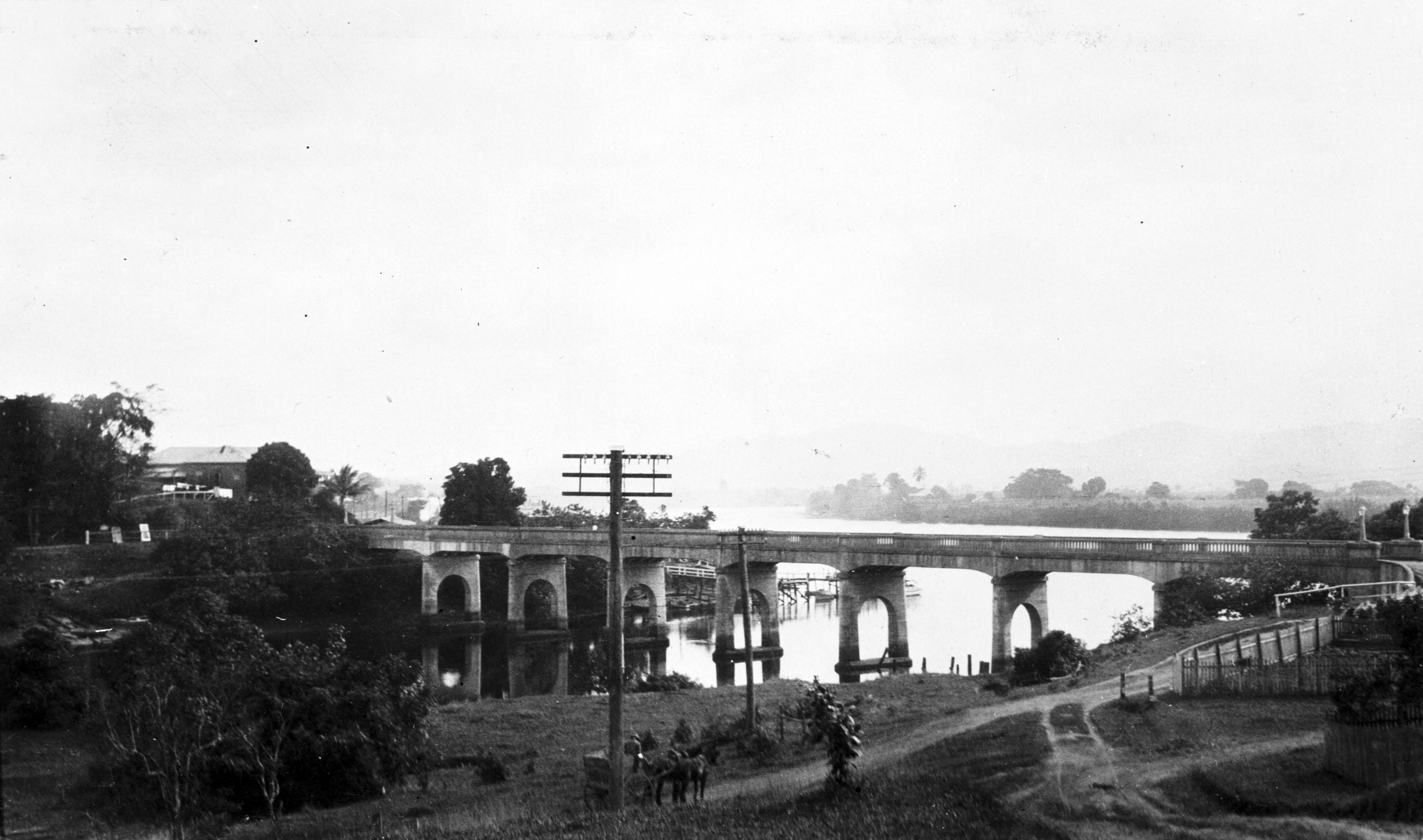
Jubilee Bridge, Innisfail

In 1977, Fletcher pleaded guilty to the rape and attempted murder of a young female in Innisfail as she walked across the Jubilee Bridge which crosses the crocodile-infested Johnstone River. Aged 23, Fletcher saw the woman walking home late at night, accosted her, forcibly raped her and punching her unconscious before trying her bra around the neck and dumping her in the Johnstone River. The woman regained consciousness in the water, and Fletcher was sentenced to eight years imprisonment for the rape and 15 for the attempted murder.

=== Kidnapping and reckless injury ===
In 1989, Fletcher kidnapped and caused serious injuries to a 13-year-old girl In Bright, Victoria. The victim, Donna Rupp was riding her pushbike home in the afternoon when Fletcher surprised Rupp by appearing as she crossed a bridge. Fletcher "yelled at [Rupp] to get off [her] bike and [she] tried to run in the other direction". Vehicles driving past Fletcher and Rupp noticed her injury, and stopped to assist. Rupp mouthed "help me", causing the drivers to assist Rupp and capture Fletcher at gunpoint and convey him to a police station. Following the attack, Fletcher was sentenced to five years' imprisonment of which he served three years.

=== Abduction and bodily harm ===
In 1997, Fletcher abducted a 16-year-old girl from a train station in Wynnum at knifepoint, punching her unconscious and strangling her. When the woman woke up inside Fletcher's car with her wrists now bound, she kicked his car door open and was saved by a group of teenagers passing by. As Fletcher took off from the scene in his vehicle, one of the teenagers threw a projectile at the vehicle, shattering the rear window.

Fletcher was convicted and sentenced to seven years' imprisonment.

== Review of indefinite sentence ==
In 2011, Fletcher was eligible for a review of his indefinite sentence. At the proceeding, Fletcher told Justice Anthe Philippides he would “rather the indefinite sentence stay as it is”.

== Bid for release ==
In 2022, Fletcher bid for release citing terminal illness. In response to Fletcher's bid for release, the police officer responsible for charging Fletcher stated Fletcher was "the most dangerous, perverted, sexual offender that [he had] ever come across" calling him "a brutal psychopath" and "wishing him well" but hoping Fletcher "dies in jail".
