= Leslie Randall (actor) =

English actor (1924–2020)

- Leslie Randall in Billy Liar 1963
- Born: Charles Leslie Randall; 19 October 1924
- Died: 25 April 2020 (aged 95)

Charles Leslie Randall (19 October 1924 – 25 April 2020) was an English film and television actor, from South Shields, County Durham, who worked in the United Kingdom, the United States and Australia.

== Life and career ==
Randall had a lengthy career, but possibly his most important role was with his wife in Joan and Leslie, ITV's first home-grown situation comedy. He also appeared in the 1963 film version of Billy Liar where he played Danny Boon, and as Reggie Wilkie in episodes of Emmerdale from 1999–2000, as well as episodes of The Monkees and I Dream of Jeannie.

During World War II, he served with the Royal Air Force as a pilot officer bomb aimer with 358 Squadron, in the Far East.

His wife was Joan Reynolds, whom he met when they were both in repertory theatre in Darlington from 1948 to 1951. They married 1951, and had two children, Susan and David. They divorced in 1978. She died in May 2011.

Randall died on 25 April 2020, aged 95.

== Television ==
Year	Title	Role	Notes
1967	The Monkees	Mayberry	S2:E12, "Hitting the High Seas"
