= Death of a Soldier =

1986 Australian film

- VHS cover
- Directed by: Philippe Mora
- Written by: William L. Nagle
- Produced by: David Hannay; William L. Nagle
- Starring: James Coburn; Bill Hunter; Reb Brown; Maurie Fields
- Cinematography: Louis Irving
- Edited by: John Scott
- Music by: Allan Zavod
- Production company: Suatu Film Management
- Distributed by: Open Eye
- Release date: 16 May 1986
- Running time: 93 minutes
- Country: Australia
- Language: English
- Budget: $4 million

Death of a Soldier is a 1986 Australian historical crime drama film directed by Philippe Mora and starring James Coburn, Bill Hunter and Reb Brown. It dramatizes of the case of Eddie Leonski (Brown), an American soldier stationed in Australia who committed three murders in May 1942. The crimes, and the trial which was conducted by U.S. military authorities rather than Australian civil ones, contributed to the development of the Uniform Code of Military Justice, but also affected Australian-American relations during the war.

The film was released in Australia on 16 May 1986, to generally positive reviews. It received two AFI Award nominations - Best Actor in a Leading Role (Brown) and Best Actor in a Supporting Role (Maurie Fields).

== Plot ==
In early 1942, U.S. Army Private Eddie Leonski is stationed at the American military transit camp, Camp Pell, in Royal Park, Melbourne. The presence of American troops in the city has caused tension with locals, particularly related to what is perceived as the rambunctious behaviour of off-duty US personnel. Leonski begins murdering women, compelled by a psychotic desire to “take their voices”. Because the murders occur during nightly brownouts, he becomes known as “The Brownout Killer”.

The killing of Australian civilians by an American serviceman further inflames tensions, even after Leonski is caught. His defense attorney, Major Patrick Dannenberg, attempts to argue an insanity defense, especially after learning that Leonski's psychosis was likely triggered by a neurological condition resulting from by years of childhood abuse, exacerbated by his alcohol consumption.

However, US High Command is insistent that Leonski face the death penalty, wanting to preserve already-fragile US-Australian relations. In the end, Leonski is hanged after the personal intervention of General Douglas MacArthur prevents any appeal.

== Cast ==
- James Coburn as Major Patrick Dannenberg (based on Ira C. Rothgerber)
- Bill Hunter as Detective Sergeant Adams
- Reb Brown as Private Edward J. Leonski
- Maurie Fields as Detective Sergeant Martin
- Max Fairchild as Major William Fricks
- Belinda Davey as Margot Saunders
- Randall Berger as Private Anthony Gallo
- Michael Pate as Major General Richard K. Sutherland
- Jon Sidney as General Douglas MacArthur
- Mary Charleston as Pauline Thompson, Second Victim
- Gennie Nevinson as Gladys Hosking, Third Victim
- Duke Bannister as Colonel Spencer F. Eddy
- Len Kaserman as Major General Robert L. Eichelberger
- John Cottone as Major General Richard Marshall
- Ken Wayne as Captain Burman
- Terence Donovan as Prime Minister John Curtin
- Peter Hosking as Billy
- Frank Thring as evangelist
- Antoinette Byron as postal clerk
- Nigel Bradshaw as Sergeant Rothberger
- Brian Woeller as US padre
- John McTernan as Colonel Williams
- Lisa Aldenhoven as Girl #1 In Bar

Chris Ludowyk's Syncopators appear in the film as a jazz dance band.

== Production ==
The idea of making the film came from William Nagle, who wrote a screenplay to produce himself, and David Hannay came on board as co-producer. American Dick Richards was originally meant to direct, but Philippe Mora then became involved. Mora and the producers wanted to import Americans to play three roles: Leonski, his best friend Gallo, and lawyer Danneberg; Actors Equity only agreed to two. At one stage, it was announced that the movie would be called Leonski and be shot in August 1981 with Don Lane as a US Army major.

James Coburn had previously turned down a role in Mora’s The Return of Captain Invincible, before he was cast as Major Dannenberg. His character is largely based on the real Leonski’s defense attorney, Ira C. Rothgerber, though Rothgerber was “a short 29-year-old second lieutenant in the Army” when the real trial took place. A character named "Sgt. Rothberger" was added to the film as a nod to him.

Under the working title War Story, filming took place on location in Melbourne and Geelong. The producers were able to film the trial and hanging scenes in the locations where they occurred. Ira Rothgerber served as a technical and historical consultant. At the time, the film generated some controversy over its claim that Douglas MacArthur had directly interceded to ensure Leonski’s hanging in order to protect the relationship between Australians and US servicemen. In an interview with the Los Angeles Times, Rothgerber said MacArthur could have stopped the hanging and didn’t, though he doubted that MacArthur played quite as active a role in the case as the movie depicts.

One of the most controversial scenes in the film depicts an battle involving rifle fire between the fighting men of the two nations, taking place on adjacent platforms at Flinders Street railway station, the main urban transport hub in Melbourne. Tensions Australia-wide were apparent at times, the most striking example being the Battle of Brisbane, a violent riot involving American servicemen and Australian servicemen and civilians, which resulted in one casualty and hundreds of injuries. News of thiat incident was quickly suppressed by authorities in both countries for fear of affecting morale. Violent fisticuffs in Melbourne streets occurred later, giving some credence to that part of the film's plot.

The budget was originally meant to be $3 million, but that became inadequate during shooting and additional funds had to be raised. To save money the shooting schedule was reduced and some of the crew complained to the Australian Theatrical and Amusement Employees' Association, which put a black ban on the film. Consequently, it was a year before the film was released in Australia.

== Reception ==
Kevin Thomas of The Los Angeles Times praised the film. He liked the acting and directing, noting that "it's a suspense story that culminates into a good courtroom drama, a wry commentary on chronic American arrogance and a large-scale, meticulously detailed period piece."

Richard Brier of The Guardian liked it and said "it's a tense and gripping drama that allows both Coburn and Brown to display their considerable acting talents in a well-made, literate and hard-hitting film."

William Wolf in his review published in The Reporter Dispatch gave it three out four stars. He felt the weak link was the script failing to explain the lawyers determination to protect an accused killer. He wrote that "director Philippe Mora provides a colorful, convincing atmosphere of Melbourne during the war. The film gains from committed acting, whether in the supporting roles or star performances."

Ed Blank of The Pittsburgh Press gave it three stars and a half out of five. He said "it's a fast sit, with an engrossing story a fascinating central character." He felt the script was its weakest aspect but praised the acting of its cast especially of its lead Reb Brown.

Marylynn Urrichio, in her Pittsburgh Post-Gazette review, felt the movie lacked of tension and while ambitious the screenplay didn't live up to its full potential. However, she said that the film is worth seeing for its acting, unusual story, photography and the issues being covered.

Steve Hopgood of North Dorset Western Gazette said also felt the script was predictable. He added that it started slowly but picked up the pace. He praised the direction, and the acting, especially of James Coburn.

Terry Lawson of Dayton Daily News said he felt, on the negative side, that the movie was too woeful, a bit inadequate in military justice, and ran out of steam toward the end. On the positive side, he praised the lead actors, the director's ability to capture the atmosphere of war, and his ability bring out the best out of his actors. His conclusion was that: "it is well-meaning and unexploitive portrait of an intriguing time."

=== Cast response ===
James Coburn later said: "It wasn't very good. There were a lot of problems with the picture. For one thing we had an auteur producer. He was also the screenwriter. He wrote it too much like a comic strip. We also had a lot of auteurs working on the fucking thing. The director didn't have enough time to prepare it. I was very disappointed by the way it turned out. It was a hellava good story. It's too bad."

=== Awards and nominations ===
- Nominated: Australian Film Institute Award for Best Actor in a Leading Role (Reb Brown)
- Nominated: Australian Film Institute Award for Best Actor in a Supporting Role (Maurie Fields)

== See also ==
- The Devil Strikes at Night - a 1957 West German film, also based on the case of a World War II serviceman accused of murder, who is convicted despite evidence of mental instability, due to the political circumstances.
- Cinema of Australia

== Source ==
- Matthews, Jack (15 October 1985). "When the whole truth is not enough". The Age. Melbourne, Vic.
