= 2007 Carnation murders =

Familicide of the Anderson family in 2007

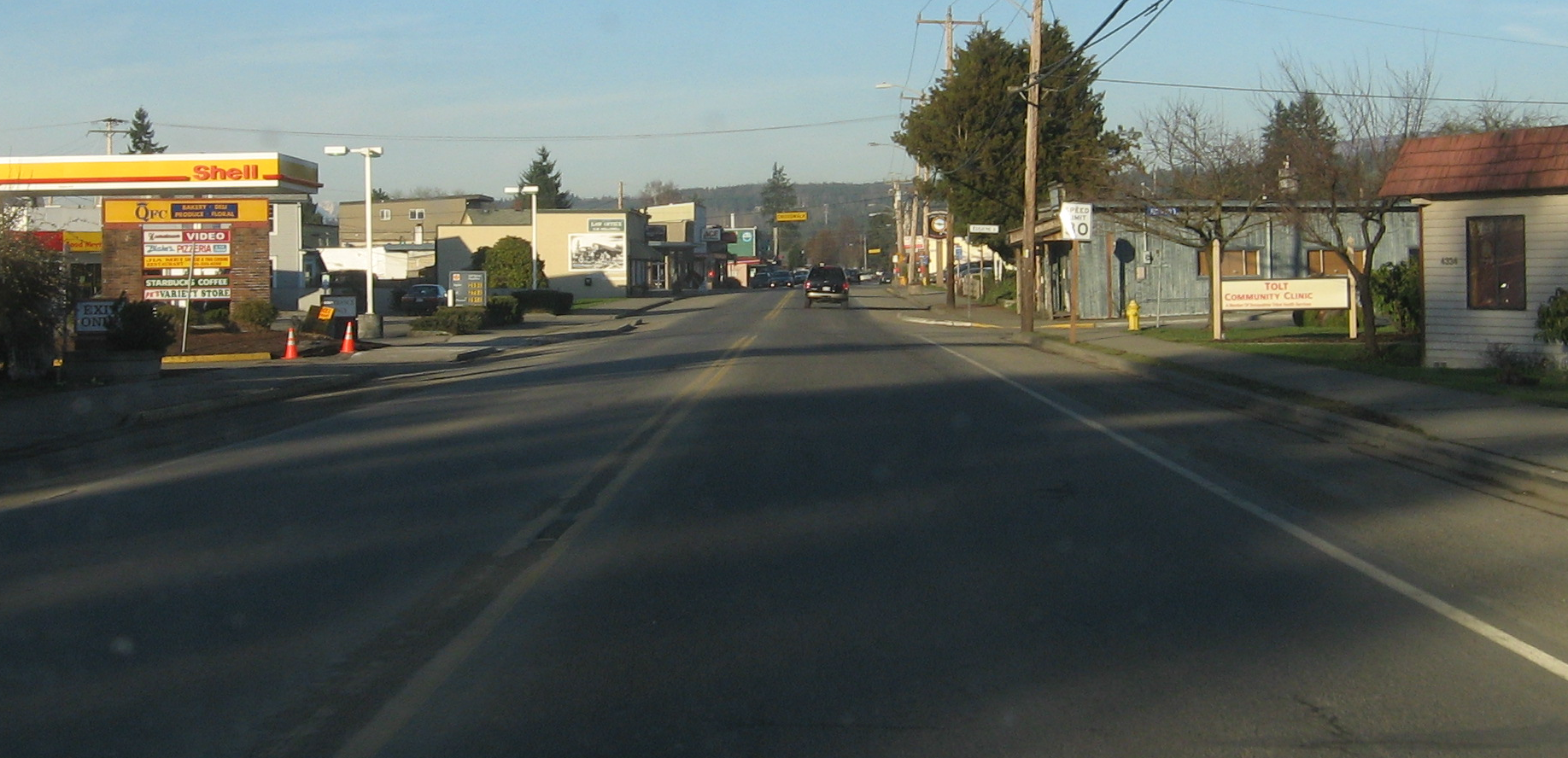
- Carnation, where the murders took place
- Location: Near Carnation, Washington, US
- Date: December 24, 2007
- Attack type: Massacre, mass shooting, Familicide
- Weapons: Smith & Wesson Model 19 .357 Magnum revolver; 9mm semi-automatic pistol
- Deaths: 6
- Injuries: 0
- Perpetrators: Michele Kristen Anderson; Joseph Thomas McEnroe
- Motive: Financial dispute

The Carnation murders were a mass murder that occurred on December 24, 2007, near Carnation, Washington, United States, a small rural town 25 miles (40 km) east of Seattle. The murders took place in the home of Wayne Scott Anderson and Judy Anderson. Six people, comprising three generations of the Anderson family, were killed.

== Victims ==
Six people were killed:

- Wayne Scott Anderson, 60, a Boeing Tool Engineering Manager and husband of Judy Anderson
- Judy Anderson, 61, a postal worker, and wife of Wayne Scott Anderson
- Scott Anderson, 32, son of Wayne and Judy
- Erica Mantle Anderson, 32, wife of Scott
- Olivia Anderson, 5, daughter of Scott and Erica
- Nathan Anderson, 3, son of Scott and Erica

== Crime ==
According to testimony, Joseph Thomas McEnroe and Michele Kristen Anderson armed themselves and drove their pickup to the home of her parents, Wayne and Judy Anderson, on the afternoon of December 24, 2007.

Once inside, McEnroe distracted Judy Anderson, who was wrapping Christmas gifts, while Michele attempted to shoot her father. Michele's gun jammed, so McEnroe killed Wayne and then Judy Anderson.

The two then dragged the bodies outside and carefully cleaned the home and waited for Michele Anderson's older brother, Scott, his wife, Erica, both 32, and their two young children to arrive.

Once the family arrived, Michele Anderson shot her brother several times, killing him. McEnroe and Anderson shot Erica Anderson. Wounded, she managed to get to the home's cordless phone and dialed 9-1-1. The connection only lasted a few seconds and dispatchers heard what sounded to them like people arguing at a party. McEnroe was able to grab the phone from her, tore the batteries out of the receiver, and smashed it on the floor. McEnroe delivered the fatal shot to Erica, and he then shot and killed the children, 5-year-old Olivia and 3-year-old Nathan, at the request of Anderson because they didn't want witnesses and said the children would be scarred for life having seen their parents killed. All 6 victims were shot in the head. The pair had fired a combined total of 16 shots. Police were dispatched to the scene in response to the 9-1-1 call, but the gate to the property was locked and the officers decided not to investigate further. The gate was only locked because Michele Anderson had run out to lock it after she realized Erica's 9-1-1 call went through.

The bodies were discovered two days later, on December 26, when Judy's best friend and co-worker Linda Thiele went to the home to see why she was absent from work. She looked in the window and saw bodies on the floor, so she called 9-1-1. She initially thought she was looking at the bodies of Wayne and Judy, but they turned out to be Scott's and Erica's bodies. While King County detectives were at the property in response to Thiele's 9-1-1 call, McEnroe and Michele Anderson drove up and were brought in for questioning. Eventually, both of them admitted to the murders and were arrested.

Prosecutors told jurors the motive for the killings was money. Anderson alleged her brother owed her money and she believed that she had been slighted and mistreated by her parents and brother.

== Arrests ==
Arrested and indicted as the perpetrators of the killings were Michele Kristen Anderson (who was unemployed) and her boyfriend, Joseph Thomas McEnroe (a Target employee), both aged 29. They were each charged with six counts of first-degree murder. Michele is the younger sister of Scott and the youngest child of Wayne and Judy.

The suspects waived their right to appear in court. Police say they confessed to the killings.

== Trial and sentencing ==
McEnroe confessed to the murders in January 2014 in an effort to avoid execution. On December 19, 2014, a 16-member jury was selected to hear the case against McEnroe. On March 25, 2015, the jury found Joseph McEnroe guilty of aggravated first-degree murder on all six counts. On May 13, 2015, Joseph McEnroe, who had several severe meltdowns during trial, was sentenced to life in prison, and avoided the death penalty, mainly due to a statewide moratorium on the death penalty by then-governor Jay Inslee. On March 4, 2016, Michele Anderson was found guilty of six counts of aggravated first-degree murder. She was sentenced to life imprisonment in April 2016. McEnroe is currently imprisoned in the Washington State Penitentiary and Anderson is currently imprisoned in the Washington Corrections Center for Women.
