= Linda Papadopoulos =

British-Canadian psychologist

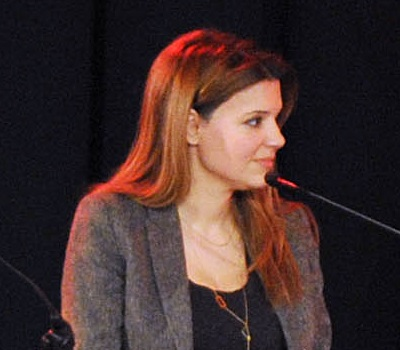
- Born: February 3, 1971 (age 55); Toronto, Ontario, Canada
- Education: York University; University of Surrey; City University
- Website: drlinda.co.uk

Linda Papadopoulos (born February 3, 1971) is a Canadian psychologist based in England.

== Education ==
Papadopoulos was born in Toronto, Ontario, Canada, on February 3, 1971. She earned a BA degree in psychology from York University in Toronto, Ontario, Canada, an MSc in health psychology from the University of Surrey in the United Kingdom and a PhD in psychology from City University in London.

== Career ==
In 2010, she was commissioned by the Home Office to write a review on the effects of sexualisation on young people.

Papadopoulos appeared as the resident psychotherapist for 3 seasons of VH1’s reality show Celebrity Fit Club. She also hosted the Discovery Fit & Health channel TV series My Naked Secret, which told the personal stories of people who are hiding physical abnormalities. She has been a regular commentator on many true life crime and history programs on UKTV channels.

Papadopoulos currently appears as a consulting psychologist for the Reelz documentary television series Autopsy: The Last Hours of…, which explores the life of celebrities and circumstances of their deaths.
