= Donna Perry (serial killer) =

American serial killer

- Born: Douglas R. Perry
- Conviction: Aggravated first degree murder (3 counts)
- Penalty: Life imprisonment

Details
- Victims: 3–9
- Date: February 22 – May 15, 1990
- Locations: Spokane County, Washington, US
- Date apprehended: March 2012
- Imprisoned at: Washington Corrections Center for Women

Donna R. Perry (born Douglas R. Perry) is an American serial killer. She was charged with three counts of first degree murder in 2014 for killing three women Spokane County, Washington in 1990. Perry underwent gender-affirming surgery in 2000; her gender identity formed a portion of the defense's argument.

== Early life ==
Perry alleges sexual abuse by her father from age four until her father's death three years later, according to her attorney.

== Crimes ==
Perry's criminal record lists various charges dating back to 1974. In 1987, Perry was charged with reckless endangerment. In 1988, Perry was arrested for possessing a pipe bomb and was subsequently found to have 49 guns and 20,000 rounds of ammunition. In 1989, Perry was arrested for soliciting a prostitute. In the late 1990s, Perry spent 18 months in jail after being pulled over in Oregon's red light district with a gun and knife. During this prison sentence, Perry allegedly confessed to her cellmate to killing nine prostitutes.

Perry shot and killed sex workers Yolanda A. Sapp (26), Nickie I. Lowe (34), and Kathleen A. Brisbois (38) during a four-month period in Spokane County, Washington in 1990. Sapp's body was discovered on February 22, Lowe's on March 25, and Brisbois' on May 15. The women were all found naked near the Spokane River, where they were dumped. Until 2012, they were believed to be additional victims of convicted serial killer, Robert Lee Yates.

== Trial and imprisonment ==
In March 2012, Perry was convicted for firearms possession. As part of the legal process, her DNA was submitted to a national database, which matched it to DNA relating to the 1990 murders. In a 2012 affidavit, Perry told police that she intentionally had gender-affirmation surgery, which she underwent in Thailand in 2000, "as a permanent way to control violence".

In 2014, Perry was charged with three counts of first-degree murder. Perry was originally to stand trial in 2016. However, due to an ethics breach in the Spokane County Public Defender's Office, attorneys Kyle Zeller, Nathan Poston and Brooke Hagara resigned in April of that year, forcing the trial to be postponed.

The trial began on June 9, 2017. The prosecution cited DNA and fingerprint evidence in connection to the three killings. A portion of Perry's defense relied on his claim that it was Douglas Perry, not Donna, who may have committed the murders. The prosecution argued, contrarily, that Perry underwent gender-affirmation surgery in order to avoid suspicion in the killings. Perry's defense attorney, Pat Donahue, argued the DNA evidence only proved that Perry was in the area where the crimes took place.

On July 24, 2017, Perry was sentenced to three life terms without parole for aggravated first degree murder. She is currently detained at the Washington Corrections Center for Women in Gig Harbor, Washington.

== In media ==
Television

- Inside the Mind of a Serial Killer - Season 2, Episode 5, “Douglas Perry” (2016)
- Scene of the Crime - Season 2, Episode 1, "Down by the River" (2018)
- 21st Century Serial Killer - Season 1, Episode 7, “Donna Perry” (2019)
- Making a Serial Killer - Season 1, Episode 4, “Donna Perry”, (2021)
- Forensic Files II - Season 2, Episode 11, "Full Circle” (2021)

== See also ==
- List of serial killers in the United States
