= Piano Concerto (Busoni) =

1904 composition by Ferruccio Busoni

- by Ferruccio Busoni
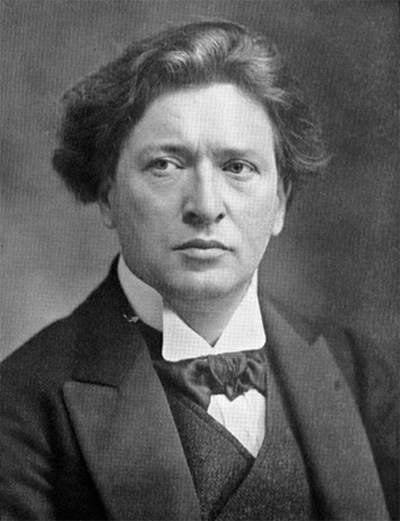
- The composer in 1905, soon after completing the concerto
- Key: C major
- Catalogue: BV 247
- Opus: 39
- Based on: Aladdin by Adam Oehlenschläger
- Composed: 1901–04
- Performed: November 10, 1904: Berlin
- Published: 1906 by Breitkopf & Härtel
- Duration: 70 min
- Movements: 5
- Scoring: piano; orchestra; men's chorus

The Piano Concerto in C major, Op. 39 (BV 247), by Ferruccio Busoni, is one of the largest works ever written in the genre. Completed and premiered in 1904, it is about 70 minutes long and laid out in five movements played without a break; in the final movement an invisible men's chorus sings words from the verse-drama Aladdin by Adam Oehlenschläger.

== Premiere and reception ==
Busoni intended to dedicate the concerto to his friend William Dayas, but he died in 1903. The first performance took place in the Beethoven-Saal, Berlin, Germany, on November 10, 1904, at one of Busoni's own concerts of modern music. Busoni was the soloist, with Karl Muck conducting the Berlin Philharmonic Orchestra and the choir of the Kaiser Wilhelm Memorial Church. The reviews were mixed, some expressing hostility or derision.

A year later, the work was played in Amsterdam by the Concertgebouw Orchestra, conducted by Busoni, with Egon Petri as soloist. Dayas's daughter Karin, a pianist, performed the American premiere in 1932. The century following has seen relatively few performances, owing to the large orchestration, complex texture, need for a male chorus, and the staggeringly demanding solo part.

== Structure ==
Although the five movements are laid out separately in the score, Busoni stated that the concerto should be played as a continuous whole without breaks.

1. Prologo e introito. Allegro dolce e solenne
2. Pezzo giocoso
3. Pezzo serioso:

Introductio. Andante sostenuto
Prima pars. Andante quasi adagio
Altera pars. Sommessamente
Ultima pars. A tempo

4. All' italiana. Tarantella vivace in un tempo
5. Cantico. Largamente (with chorus)

Prologo e introito

The opening movement is a little over fifteen minutes long and is a broad Allegro with a clangorous piano part.

Pezzo giocoso

This movement is a kind of Scherzo, mostly a light-fingered affair for the piano, using Italianate rhythms and melodic material, even if the melodies evoke Italian popular music more than they quote Italian folk music.

Pezzo serioso

The twenty-minute middle movement in D-flat major is the longest movement, consisting of four sections and their recapitulations.

All' italiana

This movement is perhaps the most variegated in its use of the orchestra, with a terrifically virtuosic piano part, arguably more difficult than anything that has come before it in the work. There are two cadenzas, one included in the printed score, the other an insert in the two-piano score that amplifies the one printed in the two-piano edition.

Cantico

The slow final movement with male chorus brings full circle themes heard earlier in the concerto. Its words sung by the men are from the final scene of Oehlenschläger's verse-drama Aladdin.

== Use of chorus ==
It seems to have been Beethoven who first included a chorus in a concerted work with piano and orchestra, in his Choral Fantasy, Op. 80, of 1808; (Note: Coincidentally, the same year in which Oehlenschläger published the German edition of Aladdin.) since then only a handful of works have been scored for similar forces, including Daniel Steibelt's Piano Concerto No. 8 (first performed March 16, 1820, in Saint Petersburg) and the Piano Concerto No. 6, Op. 192 (1858) by Henri Herz which also have a choral finale.

== Problems of performance ==
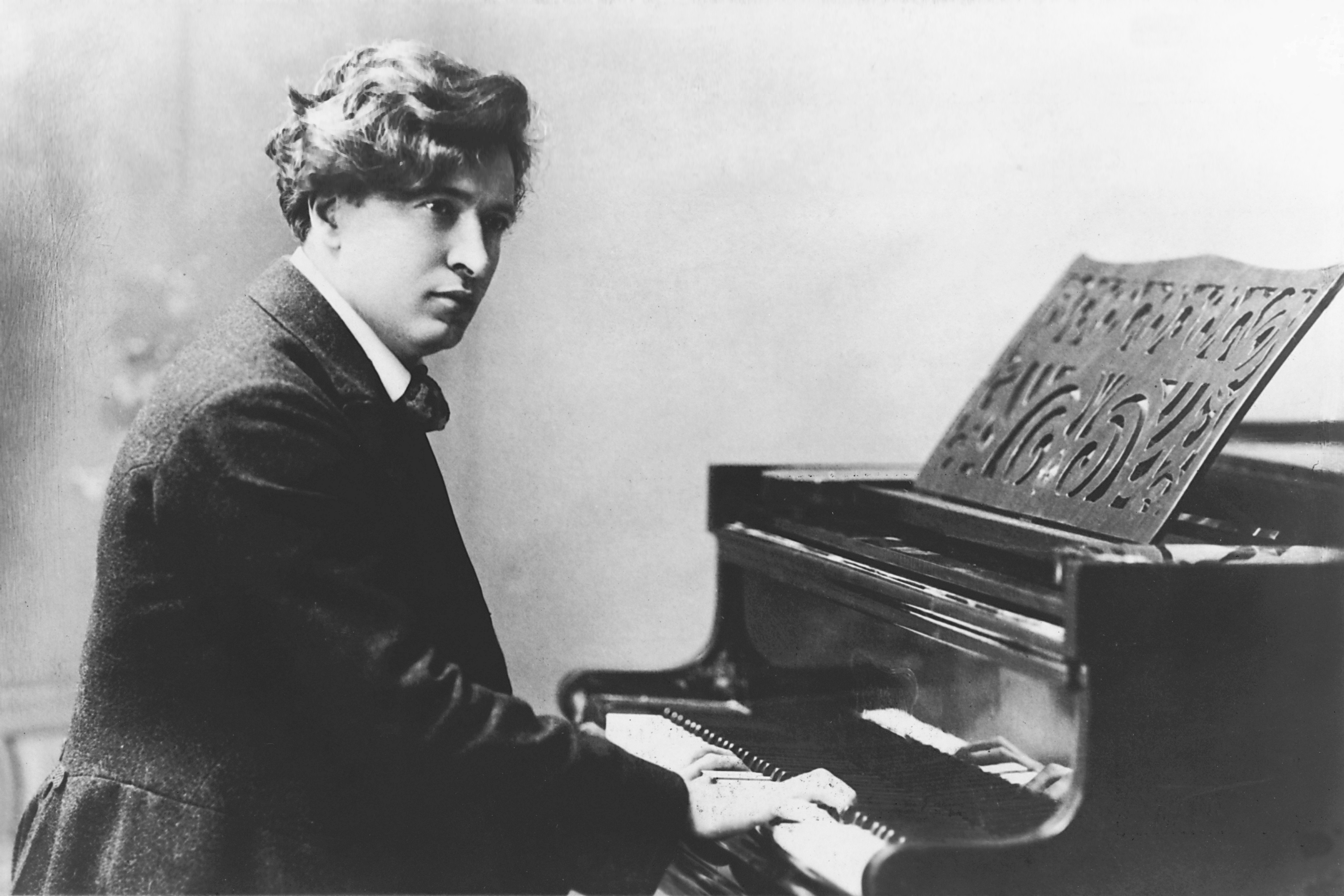
Ferruccio Busoni at the piano.

Apart from the immense demands required of the soloist and the large forces needed, there is a further difficulty that can affect performances of this work: the role of the soloist.

As Busoni himself wrote, piano concertos tended to be modelled after either Mozart or Beethoven. In Mozart's case, the concerto centers around the virtuoso composer-performer, who appears to spontaneously create the work before us, on-stage. The orchestra mostly provides a background accompaniment. But with Beethoven, the work is often conceived in symphonic terms; the piano takes the secondary role, reflecting on or responding to ideas that have already been introduced by the orchestra (excepting his fourth piano concerto).

Busoni combined both these precedents in the Piano Concerto, Op. 39, creating a huge work of symphonic proportions which was originally accused of having only a piano obbligato. The work presents exceptional challenges for the soloist, who is often nevertheless required to incorporate a glittering cascade of notes into the overall orchestral sound. This self-abasement of the familiar 19th-century heroic soloist's role thus requires careful consideration of balance in performance. But as Edward Dent comments:

Despite the incredible difficulty of the solo part, Busoni's concerto at no point offers a display of virtuosity. Even its cadenzas are subsidiary episodes. At the same time the pianoforte hardly ever presents a single theme in its most immediate and commanding shape. It is nearly always the orchestra which seems to be possessed of the composer's most prophetic inspiration. Busoni sits at the pianoforte, listens, comments, decorates, and dreams.

Marc-André Hamelin offered the following perspective on the work:

I find that a lot of people are sort of disoriented when they first hear it because they expect the traditional piano concerto, which it is not. [...] If you are expecting something much more symphonic, then you have a better chance of appreciating it for the first time.

== Busoni and Aladdin ==
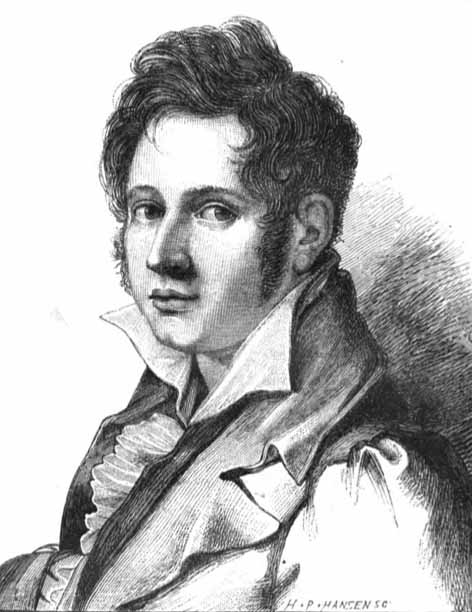
Adam Oehlenschläger as a young man

Adam Oehlenschläger's verse drama Aladdin, or the Magic Lamp was first published in Danish in 1805. The play has a number of parallels with the works and ideas of Goethe, such as the Faust-figure of the wicked magician Noureddin who takes advantage of Aladdin's youth and inexperience to get hold of the wonderful lamp; Goethe was also much preoccupied with Plato's philosophy, including his theory of Forms and the allegory of the Cave.

During his travels in Germany in 1805–6, Oehlenschläger spent several months in Weimar in the company of Goethe and his closest circle of friends. He used the opportunity of his daily visits to read out Aladdin to Goethe, freely translating from the Danish. At the time, Goethe was in the process of completing the final version of Faust, Part 1.

Subsequently, Oehlenschläger prepared a German edition of Aladdin, translating and revising the work himself and adding an explanatory introduction for his intended German readers. This edition was published in 1808 in Amsterdam. The new version included a special dedicatory poem To Goethe and was split into two parts, intended to be given on two successive evenings. More especially, this version had a new finale differing considerably from the original Danish edition by having various magical scenic transformations.

As Oehlenschläger stated in his introduction to the 1808 version of Aladdin, he was not a native speaker of German; he admitted to incorporating various Danish modes of expression (Danismen) into his translation. His "unidiomatic and erroneous" use of German had hindered the play's success. In preparing a later German edition (1820 at the latest), he made a large number of changes and minor improvements, also correcting his imperfect German: but he dropped the magical 1808 ending, reverting to the original Danish 1805 finale. The first complete English translation, by Theodore Martin, published in 1863, is also based on a later edition, thus the first editions in German are the only ones to incorporate the words which Busoni uses.

Busoni was quite taken with this early German version of Aladdin and planned to adapt it as a one-evening work. In a letter to his wife, dated London, February 10, 1902, Busoni wrote:

I have thought it out and decided not to use Oehlenschläger's Aladdin for an opera, but to write a composition in which drama music, dancing and magic are combined – cut down for one evening's performance if possible. It is my old idea of a play with music where it is necessary, without hampering the dialogue. As a spectacle and as a deep symbolic work it might be something similar to the Magic Flute; at the same time it would have a better meaning and an indestructible subject [mit besserem Sinn und einem nicht tot zu machenden Sujet]. Besides this, I have planned 6 works for the summer, the principal one being the pianoforte Concerto. How beautiful!

However, Busoni never completed his adaptation of Aladdin, although he did compose music for the final chorus in the magic cave; this soon made its way into the Piano Concerto. As Busoni's biographer Edward J. Dent remarks:

One may indeed wonder why an essentially Italian work should end with verses in praise of Allah. The plain fact was that Busoni at the moment happened to be interested in Aladdin and had set the final chorus to music. When he planned the Concerto he saw that this chorus, which has something of the mystical character of the concluding stanzas of Goethe's Faust, was exactly the music to give the general sense of serenity that he required for his own finale. It was from the original Aladdin chorus that he took the theme which occurs in the first movement; when he came to write out the last movement he felt that he missed the words, and therefore directed that a chorus of men's voices should sing them.

In the finale of the play, the grown-up Aladdin replaces the lamp with its genie (or spirit) back in the magic cave where he first found it. The somewhat obscure (if exalted) words that Busoni sets are voiced by the rock pillars themselves: Oehlenschläger's stage direction "Deep and quiet, the pillars of rock begin to sound:" is printed above the score where the chorus enters. Busoni follows the text exactly, only omitting a few verses which were not appropriate. According to Dent:

"The actual meaning of the words hardly matters. The chorus is directed to be invisible; it sings in plain chords, like a body of soft trombones added to the orchestra. The effect which Busoni desired was stated by him once in a letter to a friend who had mistakenly suggested to him that it might be better to re-write the chorus for mixed voices; he replied that he had no desire to convert his Concerto into an oratorio; he insisted that the chorus should be invisible, and said that its function was 'to add a new register to the sonorities which precede it'."

Goethe's Urphänomen

Nevertheless, in these mysterious lines added for the 1808 German edition of Aladdin after several months of daily contact with Goethe, Oehlenschläger seems to be drawing on Goethe's holistic, non-Newtonian concept of the Urphänomen (German: primordial phenomenon) which Goethe used in his scientific works, especially the Theory of Colours; at the same time, Hegel was also developing this idea in his own philosophy, involving the concept of the Gestalt (Ger: Form), sometimes translated as "formation" or "configuration of consciousness". (Note: The purpose of the Urphänomen is to provide an authentic conception of a whole complex process. (Blunden n.d.) According to Andy Blunden, this was fundamental to Goethe's scientific work. In his Italian Journey, Goethe described his studies of variations in plants, making botanical sketches of them and sensuously familiarising himself with all the variations of what he took to be the same basic archetype. All plants, he believed, were a realization according to conditions, of an underlying form which he called the Urpflanze or primordial plant. (Blunden n.d.))

In his study of Danish poets and their encounters with German artistic movements, Viktor Schmitz (Schmitz 1974) considers the Urphänomen – or genesis of the creative mindset – as expressed by Goethe, Oehlenschläger and Schiller, who had been close friends with Goethe for many years and died in May 1805. In a poem in which he pays homage to Goethe, Schiller praised happiness or luck (Glück) as a gift of the gods, a present without merit or benefit. This praise applied to what Schiller admired in Goethe, but did not possess himself. But for Oehlenschläger – since Aladdin – happiness remained a sign of election (ein Zeichen der Erwählung) and of itself, of 'having been chosen'; almost a primordial phenomenon (Urphänomen) of poetry, as the struggle (or war) was for Schiller, or the demonic for Goethe.

One alternative to this holistic approach was the dualism espoused by another Danish poet Jens Baggesen (a slightly older and overshadowed contemporary of Oehlenschläger), whose works were based on a consistently maintained pantheistic outlook, resulting in a strongly emphasized antithesis between the earthly and the heavenly. Baggesen, who wrote in accordance with a strictly defined poetics, deeply desired to overcome this tension; but since he realized that his own dualist climb toward lofty heights (a recurring motif) would scarcely be successful, he praised Oehlenschlager and Goethe, whose poetry seemed to promise a synthesis, a new world void of such restriction.

Hegel expressed the idea of the Urphänomen in a letter to Goethe in February 1821 as the concept of "a spiritual breath: ... To ferret out the Urphänomen, to free it from those further environs which are accidental to it, to apprehend as we say abstractly – I take this to be a matter of spiritual intelligence for nature". (Note: Goethe, in his wide-ranging essay "On Granite" of 1784, went to a hill composed of this stone and soliloquized as follows:(Steiner 1928, chapter 4) "Here you are resting on a substructure that extends to the very depths of the Earth; no newer stratum, no deposited, heaped-up fragments are laid between you and the firm foundation of the primordial world; you are not passing over a continuous grave as in yonder fruitful valleys; these peaks have brought forth no living thing, have devoured no living thing; they are antecedent to all life, they transcend all life ... Here on the most ancient, imperishable altar, built immediately above the depths of Creation, I bring a sacrifice to the Being of all Beings.")

== Text of final movement ==
Die Felsensäulen fangen an tief und leise zu ertönen:

Hebt zu der ewigen Kraft eure Herzen;
Fühlet euch Allah nah', schaut seine Tat!
Wechseln im Erdenlicht Freuden und Schmerzen;
Ruhig hier stehen die Pfeiler der Welt.
Tausend und Tausend und abermals tausende
Jahre so ruhig wie jetzt in der Kraft,
Blitzen gediegen mit Glanz und mit Festigkeit,
Die Unverwüstlichkeit stellen sie dar.

Herzen erglüheten, Herzen erkalteten,
Spielend umwechselten Leben und Tod.
Aber in ruhigen Harren sie dehnten sich
Herrlich, kräftiglich, früh so wie spät.
Hebt zu der ewigen Kraft eure Herzen
Fühlet euch Allah nah', schaut seine Tat!
Vollends belebet ist jetzo die tote Welt.
Preisend die Göttlichkeit, schweigt das Gedicht!

Deep and quiet, the pillars of rock begin to sound:

Lift up your hearts to the power eternal,
Feel Allah's presence, behold all his works!
Joy and pain interweave in the light of the world;
The world's [mighty] pillars stand peacefully here.
Thousands and thousands and once again thousands
Of years – serene in their power as now –
Flash by purely with glory and strength,
They display the indestructible.

Hearts glowed [so brightly], hearts became colder.
Playfully interchanged life and death.
But in a peaceful awaiting they stretch out,
Gorgeous, powerfully, early and late.
Lift up your hearts to the power eternal,
Feel Allah's presence, behold all his works!
Thus the dead world comes completely to life.
Praising divinity, the poem falls quiet!

Busoni did not set the subsequent closing speech of Oehlenschläger's fortunate hero as he looks around the magic cave for the last time: but Dent's assertion that "The actual meaning of the words hardly matters" can be balanced against Aladdin's final lines:

Hier ging ich als ein Knabe, da mir noch
Selbst von den Innern nur die Außenseite
Ins Auge fiel. Ein guter Geist beglückte
Mein Leben, schenkte mir ein starkes Mittel,
Um mich durch diese Endlichkeit zu kämpfen
Zum ew'gen Gipfel. Ha, da steh' ich nun!
Wohlan, so will ich auf die Ewigkeit
Auch ferner einzig und allein vertrauen.

I came here as a boy, when as yet
Only the exterior of my inward being
Caught my eye. A good spirit charmed
My life, bestowed upon me a powerful means
By which to struggle through this finitude
Towards the eternal peak. Ha, there I stand now!
Well then, in Eternity I will furthermore
Exclusively and solely place my trust.

== Other works with men's chorus ==
There are two works including a male chorus that are connected to Busoni's Piano Concerto: Aino by Robert Kajanus and Kullervo by Jean Sibelius, in which all three composers seem to evoke a similar, distinct and unusual sound-world at the first entry for the men's voices. Kajanus, the director of the Helsinki Conservatory and conductor of the fledgling Helsinki Philharmonic Orchestra, composed Aino, a symphonic poem for male chorus and orchestra in 1885. Kajanus also taught Jean Sibelius at the Conservatory, where Busoni, aged 22, was also on the teaching staff in 1888; during that year he wrote the Concert-Fantasie for piano and orchestra (BV230, Op. 29). According to Erik Tawaststjerna, "The time Sibelius spent with Busoni and the interchange of ideas contributed in no small measure to his development and in all probability to his artistic breakthrough in spring 1889.". Sibelius's Kullervo for orchestra, men's chorus, and baritone and mezzo-soprano soloists was first performed in Helsinki in 1892.

Henri Herz's Piano Concerto no. 6 in A major Op. 192 (1858) has a part-choral final movement ('Rondo oriental avec choeur') which features a hymn (in French) to 'the sons of the prophet' and 'O Mahomet divin': curiously, it ends with the words 'Gloire au prophète Allah', exactly the same sentiment expressed in the finale of the Busoni concerto.

== Instrumentation ==
The concerto is scored for a large orchestra. (For the instrumentation in Italian see below.)

Piano solo
Woodwind
1 piccolo I (2nd and 4th movements)
3 flutes (III doubling piccolo II in 4th movement)
3 oboes (III doubling cor anglais in 2nd, 3rd and 5th movements)
3 clarinets (III doubling bass clarinet in 2nd and 3rd movements)
3 bassoons
Brass
4 horns; 3 trumpets; 3 trombones; 1 tuba
Strings
12 violins I; 10 violins II; 8 violas; 8 violoncellos;
8 double basses (2 with five strings)

Percussion
3 timpani
3 additional percussion players:

bass drum (2nd, 3rd, 4th and 5th movements)
cymbals (2nd, 4th and 5th movements)
triangle (2nd, 4th and 5th movements)
tambourine (2nd and 4th movements)
tam-tam (3rd movement only)
snare drum (4th movement only)
glockenspiel (4th and 5th movements)

Male chorus (5th movement only; invisible)
48 (8 each) tenors I & II, baritones I & II, and basses I & II

== Manuscript and publication details ==
Manuscripts

- Busoni Archive No. 231 (sketch)

Title: Concerto per un Pianoforte ~~obligato~~ principale e diversi strumenti, ad arco a fiato ed a percussione; aggiuntovi un Coro finale per voci d'uomini a 4 parti. Le parole alemanne del poeta Oehlenschlaeger, danese. la Musica di Ferruccio Busoni, da Empoli.
[Concerto for ~~obbligato~~ principal piano and diverse bowed, wind, and percussion instruments; additional final chorus for men's voices in 4 parts. The German words by the poet Oehlenschläger, Dane. Music by Ferruccio Busoni, from Empoli.]
Description: 48 loose sheets, partly written on one side, and partly on two; partly folio, partly not.
Note: Also contains material relating to the ending without chorus (BV 247a).

- Busoni Archive No. 232 (sketch)

Title 1: Busoni Concerto
Title 2: Concerto per un Pianoforte principale e diversi Strumenti, ad arco, a fiato ed a percussione; aggiuntovi un Coro finale per voci d'uomini a quattro parti. Le parole alemanne del poeta Oehlenschlaeger, danese; la Musica di Ferruccio Busoni, da Empoli. (Secondo abbozzo, in esteso.)
[Concerto for principal piano and diverse bowed, wind, and percussion instruments; additional final Chorus for men's voices in four parts. The German words by the poet Oehlenschläger, Dane; Music by Ferruccio Busoni, from Empoli. (Second full sketch.)]
Date: 18. Agosto 1903. (at the end of the composition)
Description: 2 title sheets; 81 leaves, written on both sides, numbered by Busoni from 1 to 41, on every second leaf (recto), corresponding to the number of quires.
Note: The sketches comprise partly piano extracts, partly short score (particell).

- Busoni Archive No. 233 (score)

Title: Conzert für Klavier u. Orch. Op. 39
On the edge: Partyt. Ms. Autogr. Busoni-Nachlaß Nr 233
Note: Lost in 1945. Now at the Jagiellonian University in Cracow.

Publications

- Score (Partitur)

Title: Concerto per un Pianoforte principale e diversi strumenti ad arco a fiato ed a percussione. Aggiuntovi un Coro finale per voci d'uomini a sei parti. Le parole alemanne del poeta Oehlenschlaeger danese. La Musica di Ferruccio Busoni da Empoli Anno MCMIV. opera XXXIX
[Concerto for principal piano and diverse bowed, wind, and percussion instruments. Additional final Chorus for men's voices in six parts. The German words by the Danish poet Oehlenschläger. Music by Ferruccio Busoni from Empoli in the year 1904. opus XXXIX.]
Date: Finis. il 3.d'Agosto 1904. (at the end of the composition)
Instrumentation: Un pianoforte principale, 2 Flauti piccoli, 3 Flauti, 3 Oboi, 1 Corno inglese, 3 Clarinetti, 1 Clarinetto basso, 3 Fagotti, 4 Corni, 3 Trombe, 3 Tromboni, 1 Tuba, 3 Timpani, Tamburo militare, Gran Cassa, Tamburino, Triangolo, Piatti, un giuoco di Campanelli a tastiera (Glockenspiel), un Gong Chinese (Tamtam), 12 Violini primi, 10 Violini secondo, 8 Viole, 8 Violoncelli, 6 Contrabassi a 4 Corde, 2 Contrabassi che discendono al Do di 16 piedi, un Coro di voci d'uomini composto di 48 cantori.
Published: Breitkopf & Härtel, 1906, cat. no. Part B. 1949; (328 pages); cat. no. Ch. B. 1844; (men's chorus)

- Arrangement for 2 pianos; revised extended cadenza

Published: Breitkopf & Härtel, 1909. EB 2861, ed. Egon Petri; score (178 pages); extended cadenza rev. by Busoni, 1909 (5 pages).

== Performances ==
Recordings

Recording Date	Pianist	Conductor	Orchestra	Label & Cat. No.
June 22, 1932	Egon Petri	Hans Rosbaud	Frankfurt Radio Symphony Orchestra	Arbiter 134 (fourth movement only)
January 1948	Noel Mewton-Wood	Sir Thomas Beecham	BBC Symphony Orchestra	Somm-Beecham 15
January 15–16, 1956	Gunnar Johansen	Hans Schmidt-Isserstedt	NDR Symphony Orchestra	Music & Arts CD-1163
November 25, 1966	Pietro Scarpini (recorded live)	Rafael Kubelík	Bavarian Radio Symphony Orchestra	First Hand Records FHR64
June 1967	John Ogdon	Daniell Revenaugh	Royal Philharmonic Orchestra	EMI Classics 94637246726
February 28, 1985	Boris Bloch	Christoph Eschenbach	Zurich Tonhalle Orchestra	Aperto APO 86106
October 1986	Volker Banfield	Lutz Herbig	Bavarian Radio Symphony Orchestra	CPO 999 017-2
August 5, 1988	Peter Donohoe (recorded live)	Mark Elder	BBC Symphony Orchestra	EMI CDC 7 49996 2
February 1989	Viktoria Postnikova	Gennady Rozhdestvensky	Orchestre National de France	Apex 2564 64390-2
February 4, 1989	Garrick Ohlsson	Christoph von Dohnányi	Cleveland Orchestra	Telarc 80207
September 1989	Giovanni Battel	Silvano Frontalini	Warmia National Orchestra	Bongiovanni GB5509/10-2
February 8–13, 1990	David Lively	Michael Gielen	Southwest German Radio Symphony Orchestra	Koch International CD 311 160 H1
May 1990	François-Joël Thiollier	Michael Schønwandt	Nice Philharmonic Orchestra	Kontrapunkt 32057
June 20–21, 1999	Marc-André Hamelin	Mark Elder	City of Birmingham Symphony Orchestra	Hyperion CDA67143
February 19, 2008	Pietro Massa	Stefan Malzew	Neubrandenburg Philharmonic	GENUIN 88122
March 8–9, 2009	Roberto Cappello	Francesco La Vecchia	Orchestra Sinfonica di Roma	Naxos 8.572523
March 10, 2017	Kirill Gerstein	Sakari Oramo	Boston Symphony Orchestra	Myrios MYR024CD

Other concert performances

In addition to the above list of recordings, the concerto has also received concert performances in recent years by (among others, in alphabetical order): Giovanni Bellucci; Karin Dayas, Christopher Falzone; Carlo Grante; Benjamin Grosvenor; Marc-André Hamelin; Randall Hodgkinson; Martin Jones; Piers Lane; Igor Levit; Vincenzo Maltempo; Janos Solyom.

Videos YouTube links (in alphabetical order):

- Volker Banfield;
- Christopher Falzone (with OSO and transcription for solo piano_complete);
- Marc-André Hamelin; (originally telecast on March 31, 2001 on the Finnish commercial television station MTV3; 4th movement only appears on It's All About the Music Hyperion DVDA68000);
- Noel Mewton-Wood;
- John Ogdon;
- Garrick Ohlsson;
- Kun Woo Paik;
- Egon Petri (4th movement);
- Pietro Scarpini.

Noncommercial recordings A performance of the concerto by Pietro Scarpini with George Szell and the Cleveland Orchestra and Chorus was broadcast on New York's WQXR on July 10, 1966. They had previously performed the concerto in Carnegie Hall, New York, on February 7, 1966.

The amateur pianist, industrialist, and philanthropist Sir Ernest Hall (a contemporary of John Ogdon at the Royal Manchester College of Music) performed the concerto in 2000 with the Sheffield Symphony Orchestra and the Halifax Choral Society conducted by John Longstaff. A recording is available through the SSO website.
