= Blood Money (1980 film) =

- Directed by: Chris Fitchett
- Written by: Chris Fitchett; John Ruane; Ellery Ryan
- Starring: John Flaus; Bryan Brown
- Production company: GI Film Enterprises
- Distributed by: Greg Lynch Film Enterprises
- Release date: 23 October 1980
- Running time: 62 minutes
- Country: Australia
- Language: English

Blood Money is a 1980 Australian film directed by Chris Fitchett and starring John Flaus and Bryan Brown. The plot is about two criminal brothers.

The film was partially funded by the Creative Development Branch of the Australian Film Commission.

== Cast ==
- John Flaus as Pete Shields
- Bryan Brown as Brian Shields
- Chrissie James as Jeannie
- Peter Curtin as Dan
- Sue Jones as Doctor
- Michael Carman as Assistant Manager
