= Stefan Dennis =

Australian actor (born 1958)

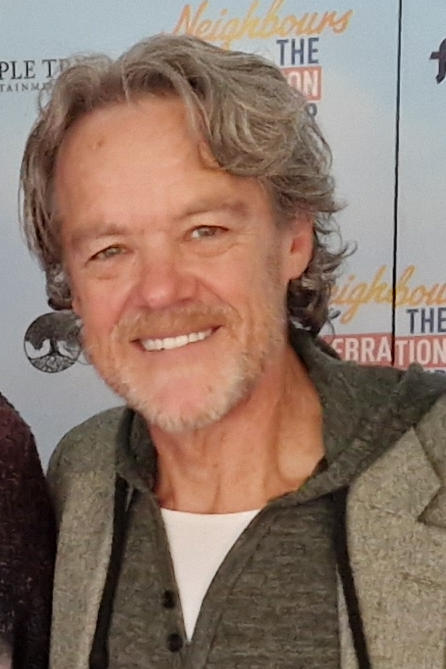
- Dennis at the Neighbours Celebration tour (2023)
- Born: 30 October 1958 (age 68); Tawonga, Victoria, Australia
- Occupations: Television actor, musician
- Years active: 1974–present
- Known for: Neighbours (TV serial) as Paul Robinson
- Spouse(s): Roz Roy (m. 1979; div. 1989) Gail Easdale (m. 2000)
- Children: 3
- Website: Official website

Stefan Dennis (born 30 October 1958) is an Australian actor and singer best known for playing the role of cold-hearted and ruthless businessman Paul Robinson in the soap opera Neighbours from its first episode on 18 March 1985. He departed Neighbours in 1992 before returning for a short stint in 1993. He then returned in late 2004 and played the character up until the show's ending in 2025. During his time away from Neighbours he was a cast member of British soap opera River City produced by BBC Scotland and set in Glasgow, Scotland playing Doctor Marcus McKenzie. He is also known for his 1989 single "Don't It Make You Feel Good", which reached Number 16 in the Irish and UK Singles Chart.

== Early life ==
Dennis was born in Tawonga, Victoria but moved with his family to the Gold Coast when he was an infant and grew up in the coastal city where he attended Southport State High School throughout his upbringing. While on the Gold Coast, he developed a passion for the performing arts and made his acting debut at 11 years old in a local amateur theatre production of Oliver!. He would also regularly perform in a vocal group with his brother at local weddings and charity events throughout the Gold Coast. At 16 years of age, Dennis left school and began a chef's apprenticeship that would last five years. Upon completion of his culinary training he moved from the Gold Coast to Melbourne in hopes of pursuing a career in the entertainment industry.

== Career ==
Dennis started out in guest roles on programmes such as Cop Shop, Skyways, Carson's Law, Young Ramsay, Prisoner, Home, The Henderson Kids, The Sullivans, The Young Doctors and Sons and Daughters and many others. He had a major role in The Henderson Kids, a co-lead in an ABC children's show called Infinity Limited, and he co-starred in The Flying Doctors mini-series as Young Doug. In 1984, he auditioned for the roles of Shane Ramsay and Des Clarke in a new soap opera, Neighbours where he was later cast as Paul Robinson instead.

After 12 years in the UK, Dennis was planning to return to Australia when he was offered the role of Dr Marcus McKenzie in Scottish soap opera River City. He accepted the six-month role, as he felt it was too good an opportunity to miss. He then worked on the Sky One sports drama Dream Team for a year, as well as The Bill, and Casualty. He also returned to Australia from time to time, where he made a number of guest appearances in shows such as Blue Heelers, Good Guys Bad Guys, and Stingers.

Dennis was part of the team that set a new world record in 1995 for 24-hour endurance outdoor karting. The team, which also included David Brabham, Russ Malkin, and Steve Malkin, set the record of 1,664.7 km (1,034.397 mi) on a 1.3 km (0.808 mi) track at Brooklands in Surrey on 24 and 25 February 1995 using a Playscape Pro Racing 160cc Zip kart. The record was authenticated by Autosport Magazine for Guinness World Records. While in the UK, Dennis became a partner in the production company Lex Film Entertainment,

After his River City character was killed-off, Dennis and his family returned to Australia. He re-joined the cast of Neighbours at the end of 2004, intending to only appear for two weeks, but stayed on as a series regular until the serial's cancellation. He is the only current cast member who appeared in the first episode, although not the longest serving due to his long break. Of his role in Neighbours, Dennis has said that people struggle to tell the difference between himself and the character and "shy away" from him because "they think I'm going to bark at them". He has conceded that it could be a testament to his acting and says "It's a real compliment though, as people know the character that well, they actually think I am like him in real life". Although his character has a prosthetic leg, Dennis does not, and he admitted that he looked forward to not having to walk with a limp once the show finished production.

In 2009, Dennis was stalked by two fans while presenting the Best Villain award at the British Soap Awards. He hosted a documentary special celebrating Neighbours' 30th anniversary titled Neighbours 30th: The Stars Reunite, which aired in Australia and the UK in March 2015. In 2018, Dennis appeared in the recurring role of Michael Armstrong QC in the sixth series of Wentworth. Dennis appears in the 2023 New Zealand thriller film Home Kills.

In August 2025, Dennis was announced as a contestant on the twenty-third series of Strictly Come Dancing. He was partnered with Dianne Buswell. Dennis was unable to perform during Movie Week on 11 October 2025 due to illness. Dennis withdrew from the show on 20 October after he tore his calf. He expressed his devastation about having to leave the competition prematurely, adding "I owe both the Strictly family and Dianne a massive debt of gratitude for giving me the opportunity to fulfil my dream of being able to dance with my wife. (When my leg is better). Fun fact for all the avid Neighbours fans... it's the same leg!"

== Music ==
In 1989, Dennis started a side-line music career, and released the single "Don't It Make You Feel Good", which reached No. 16 in the UK Singles Chart, in May of that year. He released a second single, "This Love Affair", which reached No. 67 in the UK in October 1989.

In 2013, Dennis sang and appeared as Santa Claus in the music video for his Neighbours co-star Alan Fletcher's song "If You Want a Happy Christmas".

== Personal life ==
Dennis' older brother, John, was killed by a drunk driver at the age of 12. Of the sentencing, Dennis has said: "That driver was fined just $50 for what he did. And that same weekend someone who killed a koala at Currumbin Wildlife Sanctuary got fined $200. So... well, that's hard".

Dennis was married to model and The Price Is Right hostess Roz Roy. They met when they were teenagers on the Gold Coast, where Dennis was undertaking an apprenticeship as a chef. After marrying, they moved to Melbourne so Dennis could pursue acting work. In 1989, after eleven years together, Dennis and Roy confirmed that they had separated. Dennis admitted that his heavy workload played a part in their separation.

Dennis previously dated Natalie Imbruglia and Gayle Blakeney in the 1990s while they were co-starring on Neighbours with him. He married Gail Easdale at Borthwick Castle in May 2000. They met while they were performing in a pantomime in London. They have three children. Easdale later appeared alongside Dennis in Neighbours as Julie Quill.

== Filmography ==
=== Television ===
Date	Title	Role	Notes
1978	Cop Shop	Giovanni Morelli	Episode 75
1979	Skyways	Richard	Episode: "Deborah Loves Jim"
1979–1980	Prisoner	Shayne Berkley / Spike	Guest roles
1979–1981	Cop Shop	Steve / Booking Clerk / Francis Allen Turner / Vincent Cahill	Guest roles
1980	Young Ramsay	Sid Atkinson	Episode: "Gift Horse"
1981	The Sullivans	Soldier	Guest role
1981	Prisoner	Peter Richards	Recurring role
1983	Home	Paul	Episodes 29 & 30
1983	Infinity Limited	Rick	Main cast
1985	Five Mile Creek	Boy No. 2	Episode: "The Best of Mates"
1985	The Flying Doctors	Doug Hennassy	Miniseries
1985	The Henderson Kids	Terry	Episodes: "Broken Lights and Broken Dreams: Part 1 and 2"
1985–1993, 2004–2025	Neighbours	Paul Robinson	Series regular
1996	The Office	Nigel	Television film
1997	World Fun	Stefan C Dyson	
1997	Blue Heelers	Colin Docker	Episode: "Poetic Justice"
1998	Good Guys, Bad Guys	Andy Caesar	Episode: "Don't Cry for Me Arch 'n' Tina"
1999	Stingers	Snr. Com. Karl Hiller	Episode: "Nothing Personal"
2001–2002	Dream Team	Samuel Irving	
2002–2003	River City	Dr. Marcus McKenzie	
2002	Casualty	Mark Christie	Episode: "Innocence"
2003	The Bill	Gene Bishop	Episode: "Laid to Rest"
2014	Neighbours vs Zombies	Paul Robinson	Webseries
2015	Neighbours 30th: The Stars Reunite	Himself	Documentary
2015	Shaun Micallef's Mad as Hell	Bob Hawke	Episode: #5.2
2015	Footballer Wants a Wife	The Voice	Miniseries
2016	Neighbours: Summer Stories	Paul Robinson	Webseries
2017	Neighbours vs Time Travel	Paul Robinson	Webseries
2017	Neighbours: Mrs Robinson	Paul Robinson	Webseries
2018	Wentworth	Michael Armstrong	Recurring role
2025	Strictly Come Dancing	Himself	Contestant; series 23

=== Films ===
Year	Title	Role	Notes
1984	Channel Chaos	Cameraman	Feature film
2004	The Truth About Love	Douglie	Feature film; also associate producer
2021	Apparitions	Tom	
2023	Home Kills	Woods	

== Theatre ==
Year	Title	Role	Location / Co.
1978	Yertabulti		Victorian regional tour with Arena Theatre Company
1990	Babes in the Wood		Liverpool Empire Theatre, UK with B.C.C. Productions
1990–91	Robin Hood	Lead	Liverpool Empire Theatre, UK with B.C.C. Productions
1991–92	Aladdin	Abanazar	Mayflower Theatre, Southampton, UK with E&B Productions
1992–93	Cinderella	Buttons	Bournemouth Pavilion, UK with E&B Productions
1993	Whose Life is It Anyway?	Lead	Theatre Royal, Bath & UK tour with E&B Productions
1993–94	Jack and the Beanstalk	Jack Trot	Wimbledon Theatre, UK with E&B Productions
1994	Blood Brothers	Mickey	Comedy Theatre, Melbourne, Her Majesty's Theatre, Sydney
1994	Blood Brothers	Mickey	New Zealand tour (also director)
1994–95	Peter Pan	Peter Pan	Grand Theatre, Blackpool, UK
1995	Blood Brothers	Mickey	West End & UK tour
1995	Point of Death	Simon Cable	UK tour with E&B Productions
1997	Murder by Misadventure	Paul Riggs	Connaught Theatre, Sussex, & UK tour
1998–99	Aladdin	Abanazar	The Playhouse, Weston-super-Mare, UK
2000	Fool for Love	Eddie	Dynamic Earth, Edinburgh, Scotland
2007	Aladdin	Abanazar	His Majesty's Theatre, Aberdeen, Scotland
2009–10	Cinderella	Dandini	Wolverhampton Grand Theatre, UK
2015	Frankie and Johnny in the Clair de Lune	Marlon (voiceover)	Fortyfivedownstairs, Melbourne
2022–23	La Cage Aux Folles	Edouard Dindon	The Concourse, Sydney
2023	Neighbours: The Celebration Tour		UK tour
2026	The King's Speech	Lionel Logue	Barn Theatre, Cirencester, and UK tour
