= Adam Elliot =

Australian stop-motion animation writer, director, and producer

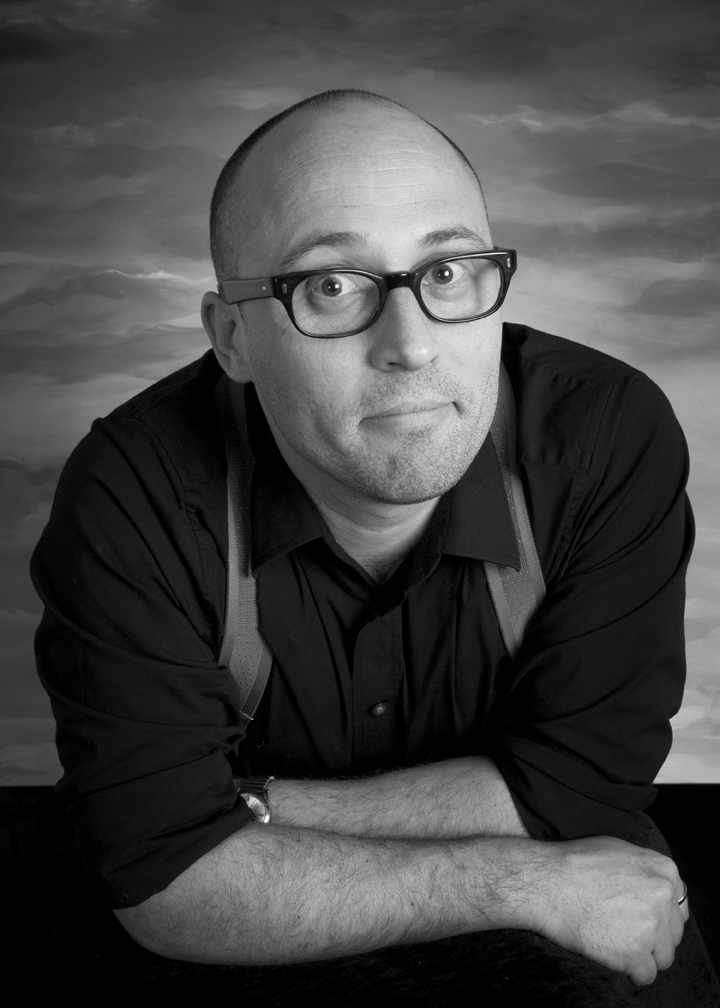
- Elliot in 2010
- Born: Berwick, Victoria, Australia
- Education: The Victorian College of the Arts.
- Known for: Clayographies – Clay Animated Biographies
- Notable work: Mary and Max, Harvie Krumpet, Memoir of a Snail, Ernie Biscuit, Uncle, Cousin, Brother
- Awards: Academy Award, Five Australian Film Institute Awards, Young Achiever of the Year for Victoria – 1999, Australian of the Year Award

Adam Benjamin Elliot is an Australian animator and filmmaker based in Melbourne. Established as an independent auteur of minimalistic animation, all of his films have generally made use of tragicomedy genre with themes of bittersweet nature and psychological development to the characters; based loosely on his family and friends, each of his films is considered a Clayography – a portmanteau genre of clay animation and biography, coined by himself.

== Early life and education ==
Adam Benjamin Elliot was born in Berwick, Victoria, and raised in the Australian outback on a prawn farm by his father, Noel, a retired acrobatic clown, and his mother Valerie, a hairdresser; he has three siblings, Samantha, Luke and Joshua. After the farm went bankrupt, Elliot's father moved the family to the city of Melbourne, where he bought a small hardware shop.

Elliot attended the Pinewood Primary State School in the suburb of Mount Waverley, and then Haileybury College, Keysborough.

Elliot had an early ambition to be a veterinarian but did not obtain the necessary grades to enter university. In extra-curricular activities Elliot was a member of the school's Highland Pipe Band. He also pursued acting and in his final year was awarded the school's highest honour, the A. G. Greenwood Trophy for an outstanding dramatic performance as Dr. Watson in the Sherlock Holmes play "The Incredible Murder of Cardinal Tosca".

Born with a hereditary physiological tremor, Elliot incorporated his disability into his visual aesthetic with his work displaying uneven lines and an organic feel. After completing his year twelve, he spent five years hand-painting T-shirts at the St Kilda, Victoria Esplanade Craft market.

In 1996 he completed a postgraduate diploma in film and television, specialising in animation, at the Victorian College of the Arts. There he made his first stopmotion film, Uncle, which won numerous film awards and participated in various international and local film festivals.

== Career ==
In collaboration with the Australian Film Commission, Screen Australia, Film Victoria (formerly Cinemedia), and the Special Broadcasting Service (SBS), Elliot made four more short films: Cousin, Brother, Harvie Krumpet, Ernie Biscuit, and two features, Mary and Max and Memoir of a Snail

== Personal life ==
Elliot is gay and thanked his boyfriend, who he was still involved with as of 2016, in his acceptance speech upon winning an Academy Award for Best Animated Short for Harvie Krumpet, becoming the first LGBT+ winner in that category.

Elliot owns two pet Pugs which serve as the inspiration for his book, The A - Z of Unfortunate Dogs.

Elliot has cited My Life as a Dog, The Elephant Man, Nuts in May, and Alice as his favourite films.

== Recognition and awards ==
Elliot is a voting member of the Academy of Motion Picture Arts and Sciences, and in 1999 was awarded The Young Achiever of the Year for Victoria.

He received an Academy Award nomination for Memoir Of A Snail and a win for Harvie Krumpet.

== Films ==
=== Uncle (1996) ===
Made in 1996, Elliot's first short film was created at the Victorian College of the Arts under the tutelage of Sarah Watt, Robert Stephenson and Ann Shenfield. With a running time of six minutes Uncle won numerous international awards including an Australian Film Institute Award for Best Australian Animated Short.

The film was shot with a 16mm Bolex camera using completely traditional stopmotion techniques, and edited on a Steenbeck, a now obsolete linear editing system. These traditional techniques taught Elliot a craft that would influence his later works and provide a strong respect for handcrafted films. To date he refuses to apply any digital effects to his films despite economic and aesthetic pressures. The budget for Uncle was approximately A$4000. Uncle is semi-biographical, about an anonymous uncle narrated by an anonymous nephew, voiced by William McInnes. Extremely static and minimalist, the story is driven by the narration and is a balance between comedy and tragedy, humour and pathos. Using strong archetypes, the story has a timeless and universal feel. To date, the film is still popular at Film Festivals (often as part of a retrospective on Elliot).

In interviews he has cited the popular adage, that "I never let the truth get in the way of a good story."

=== Cousin (1997) ===
Made in 1997, Cousin was Elliot's first professional film funded by the Australian Film Commission, SBS Independent and Film Victoria. As with Uncle, Elliot chose a minimalist approach and sparse narration to drive a very simple remembrance of a childhood relationship he had with his cousin (based on his real-life cousin), who has cerebral palsy.

Like Uncle, Cousin has a greyscale palette but was shot on colour stock. This film was shot in a small storage unit in the outer suburb of Moorabbin, in Melbourne, at a facility owned by his father. This time Elliot employed AVID digital equipment to edit the footage shot on 16mm film.

Cousin has been shown at many film festivals and won Elliot his second AFI Award for Best Australian animation. Narrated again by William McInnes, the budget for Cousin was $42,000 AUD.

=== Brother (1999) ===
Thanks to the success of his first two shorts, Brother became the natural conclusion to what is now referred to as a trilogy. Funded by the Australian Film Commission and SBS Independent, this short explores the childhood memories of Elliot's brother.

Brother marks the height of Elliot's minimalist approach and aesthetic. He made it in a friend's spare bedroom above falafel shop in the bohemian inner city suburb of Fitzroy, Melbourne. Elliot set strict rules for himself: the film should be made in a completely analog fashion using a limited amount of tools and equipment. In keeping with his purist ideals, he edited it on a Steenbeck.

Like the two previous chapters of the trilogy, Brother was narrated by William McInnes. It travelled to many international festivals, winning Elliot two AFI Awards: one for Best Australian Short Animation and one for best Australian Short Screenplay.

=== Harvie Krumpet (2003) ===
The budget to the film was AUD380,000; it was narrated by the Academy Award-winning actor Geoffrey Rush, with character voices by Kamahl, John Flaus and Julie Forsythe. In 2004 the film won an Academy Award for Best Short Animation.

=== Mary and Max (2009) ===
Elliot's first feature film had its world premiere at the Sundance Film Festival in January 2009 and was the first animated film and first Australian film in the festival's 25-year history to screen in the coveted opening night slot.

From 2 March to 6 June 2010, Mary and Max was showcased in a free exhibition at the Australian Centre for the Moving Image (ACMI). "Mary and Max: The Exhibition" provided a behind-the-scenes insight into the making of the film. Items on display included character models, costumes, storyboards, props (meticulously crafted miniature hand-blown wine glasses, a working typewriter, light bulbs) and footage of the animators at work.

=== Ernie Biscuit (2015) ===
Elliot's most current clayography short, Ernie Biscuit, is a 20-minute black-and-white short animated stop motion film exploring the life of a deaf Parisian taxidermist.

In a similar style to his Academy Award-winning Harvie Krumpet, this film is a bittersweet biography that has both comedic and tragic elements. For the first time, Elliot has explored stronger themes of love, and the overall style is quite dynamic and fast-paced. It is lighter in tone to his other shorts and is narrated by long-time collaborator John Flaus, who has voiced Elliot's previous films Harvie Krumpet, Mary and Max and Uncle.

The film was selected into official competition at the Annecy International Animation Festival and had its European premiere in June 2015. Ernie Biscuit won Best Short Animation at the 5th AACTA Awards.

=== Memoir of a Snail (2024) ===
Elliot's second feature film, Memoir of a Snail, released in June 2024. The film centres on Grace Pudel, a lonely hoarder of ornamental snails who lives in Canberra and is based on people in Elliot's life. The film stars Sarah Snook, Jacki Weaver and Kodi Smit-McPhee as the main characters, while Eric Bana reunites to work with Elliot after Mary and Max.

The film premiered at the Annecy International Animation Film Festival in June 2024 and was nominated for the Academy Award for Best Animated Feature.

== Filmography ==
Feature Films

- Mary and Max (2009)
- Memoir of a Snail (2024)

Short Films

- Human Behavioural Case Studies. Series One. (1996)
- Uncle (1996)
- Cousin (1997)
- Brother (1999)
- Harvie Krumpet (2003)
- Ernie Biscuit (2015)

== Style and themes ==
Elliot is noted for his use of traditional "in-camera" techniques, which means every prop set and character is a "real" miniature handcrafted object. He does not use digital additions or computer-generated imagery to enhance his visual aesthetic.

=== Clayography ===
The portmanteau term "clayography" was created by Elliot, who struggled with ways of describing his animation technique and so created this word to express his artistic style. A combination of the words clay and biography, the term is similar to another portmanteau term claymation, which is a registered trademark in the United States, registered by Will Vinton in 1978 to describe his clay-animated films. Clay is often used as a general term for plasticine in the stop motion animation community. As Elliot's films explore the details of real people's lives and are the basis of all his animated films, the words biography and biographical are suitable words to use in describing his work. Each of his films is a Clayography (singular) and as a body of work they are Clayographies (plural).
