= Queensland (film) =

- Directed by: John Ruane
- Written by: John Ruane; Ellery Ryan
- Produced by: Chris Fitchett
- Starring: John Flaus; Robert Karl
- Cinematography: Ellery Ryan
- Edited by: Mark Norfolk
- Production company: Film Noir Productions
- Distributed by: the Vincent Library
- Release date: 1976
- Running time: 52 mins
- Country: Australia
- Language: English
- Budget: A$12,000

Queensland is a 1976 film directed by John Ruane and starring John Flaus and Robert Karl.

== Plot ==
Doug is a factory worker living in Melbourne who dreams of moving from Melbourne to Queensland. He attempts to reconnect with an old flame, Marge, and move to Queensland together.

== Cast ==
- John Flaus as Doug
- Bob Karl as Aub
- Alison Bird as Marge
- Tom Broadbridge as Mick

== Production ==
John Ruane says he was inspired by a newspaper article about a slaughterman who killed his de facto wife and then got drunk for two days. He decided to remove the killing aspect, concentrate on the relationship. Ruane:

What we were trying to do then, strangely enough, was trying to imitate Summer of the Seventeenth Doll in reverse and to imitate Midnight Cowboy, a sort of Northcote version of Midnight Cowboy - not the story, but the fact that they were headed for a dream. Their dream was Miami. Our film was obviously about heading to Queensland... It's about a vanishing breed of Australians.

The film was made with money from the Experimental Film and Television Fund while John Ruane was a film student at the Swinburne College of Technology in Melbourne.

== Release ==
The movie was released through the co-operative movement.
