= Harvie Krumpet =

- Poster for Harvie Krumpet
- Directed by: Adam Elliot
- Written by: Adam Elliot
- Produced by: Melanie Coombs
- Starring: Kamahl; John Flaus; Julie Forsyth
- Narrated by: Geoffrey Rush
- Edited by: Bill Murphy
- Production companies: Melodrama Pictures; Australian Film Commission; SBS Independent; Film Victoria
- Distributed by: Melodrama Pictures
- Release date: June 2003 (Annecy Festival)
- Running time: 22 minutes
- Country: Australia
- Language: English
- Budget: A$377,000

Harvie Krumpet is a 2003 Australian animated tragicomedy short film written, directed and animated by Adam Elliot, and narrated by Geoffrey Rush. It tells the life story of Harvie Krumpet, a Polish-Australian man whose life is plagued by bad luck but who nevertheless remains optimistic.

The film was funded by SBS Independent, the Australian Film Commission and Film Victoria, and it was filmed and animated by Adam Elliot and two assistants over 15 months in 2001–2003, using models made of plasticine and other materials. The production was completed in May 2003.

Harvie Krumpet premiered a month later at the Annecy International Animated Film Festival, followed by over 100 subsequent film festival screenings. It won many accolades, including the Academy Award for Best Animated Short Film in 2004.

== Plot ==
Harvek Milos Krumpetzki is born in Poland in 1922. Harvie is teased at school and his mother pulls him out and helps him collect pieces of information called "fakts" that are written in a notebook hung around his neck, which are presented throughout the film. At the outbreak of World War II, his home is burned down and his parents freeze to death. Harvek migrates to Australia as a refugee, settles in Spotswood, Victoria, and changes his name to Harvie Krumpet.

Harvie's life is filled with bad luck. He is diagnosed with Tourette syndrome as a child; being punched in the skull and needing a steel plate installed while at the dump; becoming magnetised after being struck by lightning while collecting golf balls; and developing asthma due to heavy smoking. Harvie remains optimistic, living out his own eccentric way of life.

Harvie sits in the park next to a statue of Horace while he hears the instructional Carpe diem, which inspires him to make many changes in his life, such as joining a nudist group, following a vegetarian diet and embarking on daring rescue missions for animals. His testicle develops cancer. In hospital, Harvie meets nurse Val. They get married, and try to get pregnant but Harvie is sterile. Harvie and Val go to an adoption centre and find Ruby, a girl with deformed limbs due to thalidomide.

Ruby moves to the United States to pursue a career as a lawyer; Val dies of a stroke. Harvie develops Alzheimer's disease and is placed in a nursing home. He shares a room with 94 year old Hamish. Harvie and Hamish pretend to dislike each other. Harvie retrieves morphine from a medicine cabinet. Harvie realises he has more living to do, as a woman he met decided to commit suicide. Harvie takes off his clothes and sits at the bus stop. Harvie knows it will never come but he does not mind.

== Voice cast ==
- John Flaus as Harvie Krumpet
- Geoffrey Rush as the Narrator. The filmmakers approached Rush with copies of Elliot's three previous short films to ask him to be involved in Harvie Krumpet. Rush recorded the narration at the beginning of production on the film, so that his dialogue could be used to guide the animators in determining the length of each shot. When the animation was complete, however, Elliot found that "when we put his voice to the images, his voice came out a bit too cold", so Rush re-recorded his lines with a "more colourful, emotive performance".
- Julie Forsyth as Lilliana Krumpetzki and Baby Harvie. Forsyth, along with the Elwood Primary School choir, also provided vocals for the song "God Is Better than Football", composed by Keith Binns.
- Kamahl as the Statue of Horace

== Production ==
Adam Elliot conceived the idea behind Harvie Krumpet over a ten-year period, and wrote fourteen drafts of the script over three months. He created a 300-panel storyboard to visualise the film before the animation began. He described Harvie's character as "an amalgamation of many people I know", in addition to being partly autobiographical. Elliot's development of the plot began with small character details with which he could "work backwards and then find a rhythm to the piece". Harvie Krumpet marked the first time that Elliot worked with a producer, Melanie Coombs. Financing for the film's A$377,000 production budget was split between three production companies: SBS Independent, the Australian Film Commission and Film Victoria.

Harvie Krumpet was filmed in Melbourne over 15 months between October 2001 and January 2003. The film was shot in sequence in three-month blocks, interspersed with three-month blocks of building sets and models. Production began in Elliott's garage and subsequently took place in three separate studios, moving three times in order to accommodate the growing size of the sets. It was shot on Super 16 mm film using a Bolex camera. Each individual frame was animated, meaning that an average of 3–5 seconds' worth of film was produced in each full day of filming.

The film was produced by clay animation using character models each about the size of a wine bottle. The models were first constructed using plasticine before pouring Carbog, a solid material used by mechanics, into moulds to form the bodies. They were then painted to appear like plasticine, and real plasticine around wire was used for the arms. Elliot said he chose to use Carbog since models made from just plasticine would require more maintenance. Some characters had replaceable mouths made of hardened Sculpey clay that were attached magnetically to the faces to reflect different facial expressions; Harvie's model had more than 30 separate mouth shapes. The design of the models was influenced by Elliot's tremor, since he needed them to be relatively large and easy to manipulate. He made the models' eyes particularly large "to fully express the character's emotion". He intentionally left fingerprints in the plasticine when manipulating the models to remind the audience that "what they're seeing is tangible, tactile and it's not generated through a computer". He was assisted by Sophie Raymond and Michael Bazeley in constructing and modelling the characters. The sets were largely constructed from wood.

Harvie Krumpet was edited by Bill Murphy for eight days spread over several weeks. The original cut of 45–50 minutes of footage was reduced to a final cut of less than 23 minutes. Over 2000 sound clips were added during the sound design process and the film was converted to 35mm film in May 2003.

== Release and reception ==
Harvie Krumpet premiered at the Annecy International Animated Film Festival in June 2003, where it won three of the festival's four major prizes, the Prix FIPRESCI, Prix du public and Prix special du jury. Its Australian premiere was at the 2003 Melbourne International Film Festival, where it won the Best Australian Short Award. During 2003–2004, the film was screened at over 100 film festivals around the world, winning 40 awards. At the 76th Academy Awards, the film was awarded Best Animated Short Film, and in Australia it won the Best Short Animation prize at the 45th Australian Film Institute Awards and the Best Animation prize at the 2004 Inside Film Awards.

Rob Mackie awarded Harvie Krumpet 4 out of 5 stars in a review for The Guardian, describing it as "both fondly evocative and uproariously funny". The Sydney Morning Herald critic Sacha Molitorisz summarised the film as "hilarious, moving and wonderful", "a melancholy short that doesn't put a foot wrong". He praised Elliot's "meticulous attention to detail and love for his characters" as well as Rush's narration.

== See also ==
- Mary and Max and Memoir of a Snail, other claymation films directed by Adam Elliot
- List of Australian films
