= Yackety Yack =

- Directed by: Dave Jones
- Written by: Dave Jones
- Produced by: Dave Jones
- Starring: Dave Jones; John Flaus
- Cinematography: Gordon Glenn
- Edited by: Dave Jones
- Production company: Acme Films
- Distributed by: Vincent Library
- Release date: 1974
- Running time: 86 mins
- Country: Australia
- Language: English
- Budget: A$4,000

Yackety Yack is a 1974 Australian film about the making of a film directed by Dave Jones. It stars Jones and John Flaus. David Stratton called it "the Hellzapoppin' of poor cinema, a frequently hilarious spoof on the low budget film... a sheer delight."

== Plot ==
Maurice is an aspiring film director who talks about movie making with his friends, Steve, Zig and Caroline. He uses his power and edits out any statements that displease him. He asks opinion of a man on the street.

Maurice wants to commit suicide and analyses three famous suicides, Mishima, Socrates and Kirilov (a character in The Possessed). Maurice starts murdering the crew on his film before forcing Steve and Zig to assist his suicide.

== Cast ==
- Dave Jones as Maurice
- John Flaus as Steve/himself
- Peter Carmody as Zig
- Peggy Cole as Caroline
- John Cleary as building manager
- Jerzy Toeplitz as man in the street
- Doug White as Socrates
- Rod Nicholls as Kiriolov
- Andy Miller as Mishima

== Production ==
The film was heavily influenced by the work of Jean-Luc Godard. The script was originally written by Dave Jones in Montreal in 1970. Jones was an American who had worked in Hollywood before coming to teach at the Media Centre of La Trobe University in Australia in 1971.

The film was shot over five weeks in the evenings at the film studio at the university, using many staff and students of the film. It was finished at the end of 1972. Part of the budget came from the Experimental Film and Television Fund.

== Release ==
The film screened at the Melbourne Co-op Cinema in mid September 1974.
