= Infinity Limited =

Television series

Infinity Limited is an Australian science education television series produced by the ABC in Melbourne between 1982 and 1984. Despite the show's short run, it proved popular with primary school children around Australia. 37 episodes were made. Each episode was broadcast between 12 and 19 times from 1982 to 1991, with the exception of episode 83/9 "The Big Heater" which was only broadcast three times between 1982 and 1983.

The show initially starred Kim Trengove and Stefan Dennis as Kris (Kristal) and Rick who run a small business called Infinity Ltd. Dennis left the show after 20 episodes in late 1983 and was replaced by Mark Little as Rosco for the final 17 episodes. Infinity Ltd. were generally called upon to solve basic science-based problems for people. Their office was located above the basement/office of Vortex Ventures, a company who makes it their business to try and steal Infinity Ltd's customers, usually without success. Ross Williams starred as Valerian J. Vortex, the inept owner of Vortex Ventures, with Ian Scott as Arthur Plankton, his long suffering assistant who often showed signs that he was smarter than Vortex gave him credit for. Plankton is often made to perform tasks he is not happy with, such as climbing the air conditioning duct in order to eavesdrop on Infinity Ltd. Infinity Ltd. are aware of Vortex and Plankton and consider them a minor annoyance, rather than a serious threat to their business.

== Characters ==
=== Kris ===
Kristal (Kim Trengove), known as Kris to most people, is one half of Infinity Limited. Although it's a fairly even partnership, she seems to get the final say and leaves the more physical tasks to Rick. If she sees Rick on a break, she assumes he's been slacking off while she's been away. Despite this, Kris and Rick are good friends, maybe even lovers, but being a kids' show, this is not explicitly mentioned or shown. Kris appears to be in her early 20s.

=== Rick ===
Rick (Stefan Dennis) is slightly more sceptical of new ideas, taking some convincing from Kris before he's fully on board. Although he is a hard worker, he also likes his leisure time, which makes Kris sometimes think he doesn't pull his weight. He leaves for unexplained reasons and is replaced by Rosco. Rick appears to be in his early 20s.

=== Rosco ===
Practical-minded and handy at building things, Rosco (Mark Little) doesn't come up with any scientific ideas, leaving that up to Kris. He replaces Rick as the other half of Infinity Limited. Rosco appears to be in his early 20s.

=== Vortex ===
Valerian J. Vortex is the owner of Vortex Ventures, rival company to Infinity Limited. Vortex is greedy, lazy, ignorant, and unscrupulous, but not as stupid as he first appears. He can grasp scientific concepts but lacks the patience to understand a concept fully. He can also invent many different types of machine, most of which are at least partially successful before developing a fatal flaw. He is a self-described genius, and often ignores the advice from his assistant Plankton which is usually correct. Most episodes feature his latest poorly thought out but imaginative get rich quick scheme. He is almost always seen wearing a blue suit and tie. He has a moustache and a bald patch and his remaining hair is styled upwards, reminiscent of the horn-like hairdo of the Pointy-haired Boss from the comic strip Dilbert. Vortex appears to be in his early to late 30s.

=== Plankton ===
Arthur Plankton is the long suffering assistant of Vortex. He is rarely called by his first name which is only mentioned in a couple of episodes. Where Vortex is intellectually lazy, Plankton is physically lazy, although his reluctant participation in the experimental phase of Vortex's plans could explain that. Plankton lacks Vortex's guile and generally wants to do right by people but is lead astray by Vortex. He is slightly smarter than Vortex and usually notices the flaws in Vortex's plans but is ignored by Vortex. Plankton usually wears blue jeans, a thin grey V-neck school jumper with yellow, maroon, yellow stripes around the neck, and a thin grey knee-length jacket. Plankton appears to be in his late 20s to early 30s.

== Relationships ==
It is hinted that Kris and Rick might be romantically involved. Their office also appears to be a house and it's unknown where they live when they're not working. In "The Generation Gap", Kris's mum is supposed to be coming for dinner which suggests that the office is in their home. In "Melting Moments", Kris hugs Rick's arm when she introduces him to her old school friend Lucy which makes them look like a couple. Also in "Melting Moments", Miss Abernathy appears enamoured of Vortex, even calling him by his first name, at least until his latest invention fails to live up to his promises. In "The Generation Gap", Plankton notices the librarian and seems very interested in her but is interrupted by Vortex before he can chat her up.

== Episode Structure ==
Most episodes involve Infinity Limited being hired by a new client with a different problem. They will research several different methods and perform experiments to see which solutions work, and which solutions suit the client best. In about half of the episodes, Vortex will send Plankton to spy on Infinity Limited, usually by crawling up the air duct that connects their office in the basement with Infinity Limited's office upstairs. He will then try to sabotage Infinity Limited's plans while coming up with his own idea to present to the client. In the remainder of the episodes, Vortex will be doing something that just coincidentally is thematically related to the problem that Infinity Limited is solving. Vortex's plans inevitably fail in the end, and always by his own doing.

Vortex and Plankton's ignorance allows them to research the science behind the problem and explain it to each other, which is a device used to explain the scientific concept to the kids in the audience. This happens with Infinity Limited as well, with only one of the two characters understanding the concept and explaining it to the other, or alternatively, seeking expert advice where the expert explains it to both of them. Concepts are explained to other characters, not directly to the children in the audience, and later demonstrated on screen to make it engaging for the kids watching.

The series promotes critical thinking and demonstrates the difference between thorough investigation and leaping to conclusions. Many episodes discuss environmental issues as well as general scientific concepts.

== Episodes ==
Ep. no.	Title	Science concept	Running time	Production number	Writer	Additional cast	Plot outline	Runs	First year	Last year	Notes
83/1	The Earth Speaks	Fossils	19'36"	325324	Hardy Stow	Catherine Wilkin; Johnny Quinn; Mary Anne Gillis; Simon Rogers	A workman at an excavation site discovers a mysterious object in the ground which he takes to Infinity Limited for identification. Rick and Kris conclude that it is either bone or a fossil. A visit to the museum sees the find identified as a tooth by the curator of fossils. At the same time they see a variety of other fossils which illustrate characteristics of various animals. Indications that the tooth seems to be from a Diprotodon, a wombat-like animal living in Australia until 20,000 years ago, lead to the decision to investigate further with technical advice from the curator. Careful excavation, along with measurements and photographs, leads to the discovery of a jawbone and the indications of a valuable 'find'. Meanwhile Vortex Ventures follow Infinity Limited investigators to the museum, and jump to the conclusion that fossils have been stolen (empty cases in the display galleries). As usual with these two, a short attempt at investigation does not get them far. Vortex decides to 'fake' the fossils after a little research indicates what they looked like. Unfortunately for these two, a later visit to the museum shows them the truth about the empty cases.	16	1983	1991	
83/2	Thick as a Brick	Brickmaking	19'59"	325329	Hardy Stow	Alton Harvey; Marilyn O'Donnell	Infinity Limited investigates why the mudbricks a woman is making to build her house develop large cracks as they dry. Meanwhile, Vortex builds a mudbrick brickmaking machine powered by his assistant Plankton to sell bricks to the woman.	18	1983	1991	
83/3	To Bee or Not to Bee	Bees and pollination	19'26"	325330	Bronwen Nicholls	Ernie Bourne; Carol Yelland	Kris and Rick investigate why a beekeeper's bees have mostly died. Vortex's theory is that the music from a nearby music festival has chased them away and that the bees will return when the festival is over.	18	1983	1991	
83/4	Don't Count Your Chickens	Egg incubation	19'50"	325328	Bronwen Nicholls	Peter Green; Cindy Unkauf	Kris and Rick investigate why some chicken eggs have failed to hatch in an incubator at a children's home. After getting the idea from a magazine Plankton was reading, Vortex decides to raise ostriches to sell ostrich eggs.	18	1983	1991	Copyright 1982
83/5	Veg's Revenge	Nutrition	19'56"	325312	Jim Burnett	Alan Rowe; Andrew McKaige; Simon Rogers	Kris and Rick's friend Greg is working at a mine where all the miners are getting sick. Kris and Rick check out the food while Vortex is convinced it's an infectious disease.	16	1983	1991	Copyright 1982
83/6	The Case of the Terminated Trout	Water pollution	19'49"	325331	Ian McFadyen	John Larking; Roy Baldwin	A farmer comes to Kris and Rick to help prove that a tanker spill on a nearby highway was responsible for the dead fish in the stream on his property. Vortex blames the owner of a nearby factory, ignoring Plankton's attempts to stop him.	17	1983	1991	
83/7	Good Vibrations	Noise pollution	19'56"	325333	Ian McFadyen	Andrew McKaige; Roy Edmunds; Andrew Righetti; Jay Righetti; Glen Robinson; Jeff Sellenger	Kris's friend Greg's band, "World War III", is disturbing the sleep of a neighbour who works night shift. While Kris and Rick investigate sound proofing, Vortex demonstrates his latest invention to Plankton: the tin can telephone.	16	1983	1991	
83/8	These Fuelish Things	Alternative energy sources	18'48"	325334	Unknown	Terry McDermott	A farmer asks Infinity Limited to help him reduce his energy bill by converting cow pats into methane. Kris and Rick investigate more workable sources of alternative energy while Vortex and Plankton build a methane machine.	16	1983	1991	
83/9	The Big Heater		19'49"	325313	Ian McFadyen	Peter Harvey-Wright		3	1982	1983	This is the only episode not to be shown after 1983, being marked in TIS as "Removed" (to Melbourne) after its third run.
83/10	Thin Air	Wind energy/Wind resistance	19'41"	325314	Ian McFadyen	Vince D'Amico	A delivery driver comes to Infinity Limited to discover who is stealing petrol from his van. After Plankton is blown across the street while wearing an advertising sign, Vortex decides to build a wind powered car.	17	1982	1991	Copyright 1982
83/11	Waste High	Waste disposal	19'55"	325332	Unknown	John Bowman; Colwyn Roberts	During a garbage strike there are protests outside a factory. Kris and Rick think of ways to safely dispose of the factory's waste paint which is diluted in hazardous solvent. Vortex plans to sell the waste at a profit.	17	1982	1991	Copyright 1983
83/12	Vision from Above	Flight	19'55"	325335	Ian McFadyen	Keir Saltmarsh	A model plane enthusiast asks Infinity Limited why his plane crashed. Vortex decides to build a gigantic kite to take aerial photos with Plankton as the photographer.	18	1983	1991	The episode explains how an aeroplane flies using an incorrect explanation which is still commonly believed today.
83/13	An Air-Raising Experience	Balloons	19'52"	325323	Michael Harvey	John Murphy; Danny Nash	A retiring civil servant asks Infinity Limited for advice about entering a $10,000 balloon race. Vortex gets Plankton to pretend to be a schoolkid in order to get a huge number of helium balloons for the same race.	18	1983	1991	Copyright 1983
83/14	Things That Go Bump in the Night	The sky above	19'21"	325336	Unknown	Glennen Faye; Ted Hepple; Rosie Sturgess	A young UFOlogist asks Kris and Rick to prove that a strange light in the sky the night before is a UFO. Meanwhile, a prospector mistaking Vortex and Plankton for Infinity Ltd. asks them to investigate a loud bang and a hole on his land.	16	1983	1991	Copyright 1983
83/15	The Big Lift	Simple machines	19'55"	325337	Unknown	Tommy Dysart; David Gray	A strongman asks Infinity Limited to help him keep his job after he claims he can lift a baby elephant. Vortex and Plankton try to sell him a very long lever to do the job.	18	1983	1991	The strongman is played by Tommy Dysart, well known in Australia for his appearances in Yellow Pages ads where he's asking for parts for his Goggomobil.
83/16	The Generation Gap	Electricity generation	19'57"	325340	Unknown	George Manis; Reagan Shaw	When an earthquake in the Latrobe Valley knocks out all power to Melbourne, Vortex reluctantly turns to Infinity Limited to reassemble a generator that Plankton took apart in order to learn about electricity generation.	15	1983	1991	Earthquakes, especially ones large enough to cause damage, are rare in Victoria.
83/17	Melting Moments	Insulation	18'52"	325339	Unknown	Dina Mann; Val Jellay; Andrew Davidson; Katie Miller; Ashley Hempenstall	Kris and Rick are visiting Kris's friend Lucy at a fair. Lucy's ice sculpture is fast melting and it's up to Infinity Limited to save it. Vortex is trying to sell hot pies and cold ice cream out of the same container.	19	1983	1991	Copyright 1983
83/18	Gripping Yarns	Friction	19'42"	325338	Unknown	Unknown	Kris and Rick enter a competition for super fuel efficient vehicles. After discovering that golf buggy hire costs money and Plankton complains that the clubs are too heavy, Vortex designs his own buggy.	19	1983	1991	
83/19	Compute the Loops	Computers	19'58"	325341	Unknown	Irene Hewett; Doug Tremlett	When Kris and Rick go to the pet shop, they discover the owner in need of computer organisation. Vortex and Plankton enter a competition to guess how many Goopie Loops would fill the Melbourne Cricket Ground.	19	1983	1991	Copyright 1983. Since the ABC is a non-commercial station, they referenced the popular breakfast cereal Froot Loops by calling them Goopie Loops.
83/20	The Time Trap	Time	19'15"	325342	Unknown	Claire Dobbin; Rob Meldrum; Tony Hawkins	Kris and Rick assist the police when their friend is accused of robbing a clock shop at 6 o'clock precisely. Vortex tries to build a new type of accurate clock for a $10 million prize.	19	1983	1991	
83/21	Water, Water Everywhere	The properties of water	19'21"	325348	Unknown	Reg Gorman; Irene Hewitt	Rosco and Krystal become involved in a series of watery problems - they try to solve the problems of a flooded cellar by baling, pumping and siphoning. Their combined efforts keep the water in check until help arrives. Vortex and Plankton, the cause of the watery problems, get further into trouble. Along the way Vortex comes up with some wild ideas - melting icebergs and water divining are just two of them. His plans are supposed to solve a water shortage which in fact does not exist.	17	1984	1991	This episode was broadcast after episode 83/22 which introduces Rosco.
83/22	Getting It Together		19'55"	325351	Unknown	George Harlem	This program marks a major change in the main characters. Rick has left Infinity Ltd. to travel overseas and Kristal has decided to carry on the business alone. In this episode Kristal returns to headquarters to find a large box outside and uncompleted renovations inside. The builders will return ... A young man, arriving at the door is assumed to be from the builders and is set to work whilst Kris tackles the task at hand — to try to assemble the contents of the large box. When the young man, Rosco, gives assistance the mystery is gradually unravelled, through careful observation. An unusual type of bicycle is the end result. Kristal tests it out and then returns to discover Rosco had in fact come as a possible co-tenant and was not from the builders. Vortex Ventures have also been asked to attempt a solution to the problem. They proceed in their usual fashion - getting near to a solution but not quite using all pieces of equipment, nor using them as other might. When they overhear a comment from Infinity Ltd. via the air-conditioning duct, Vortex has a brainstorm and constructs what he is certain is the correct version. Plankton is chosen to test the contraption and the result is typically disastrous.	13	1984	1991	This episode introduces Rosco after it's explained that Rick (Stefan Dennis) went overseas.
83/23	The Light Fantastic	Photography	19'58"	325349	Unknown	Denzil Howson	An army intelligence agent asks Kris and Rosco for their assistance in cracking a code on three slides. Vortex and Plankton follow the agent and Rosco to a secret base and decide to build a camera to track who is going in and out.	13	1984	1991	
83/24	Moving Pictures		19'56"	325352	Unknown	Joan Letch; Evdokia Katahanas	Rosco discovers an old movie film inside a piano. He finds the film is wet and places it in the air-conditioning duct to dry (which of course means that Vortex manages to get hold of a piece of the film). Rosco then rescues an old movie projector from an 'op shop'. Several attempts to get it functioning properly are unsuccessful. Finally the problem is solved with a clue from the owner of the shop. He shows Kristal how old-style 'moving pictures' were made with a spinning disc or 'thaumatrope'. Vortex meanwhile has become convinced that 'his' piece of film contains a coded message. Stealing the remainder of the film, Vortex realises his mistake but gone on to make another one — that he is the first to discover film animation technique.	13	1984	1991	
83/25											No episode 83/25 was produced.
83/26	Fangs For The Memory	Snakes	19'56"	325353	Unknown	Pam Jones; John Cousins; Andrew Gilmour	Rosco and Krystal are given the task of finding a suitable live snake to be used in a theatrical presentation. In their investigations they learn a lot about snakes and their responses to changes in temperature. They are also forced to examine their attitudes towards snakes. Vortex and Plankton also become involved with snakes and they too learn a few new facts — before they cause chaos on the set of Cleopatra.	15	1984	1991	
83/27	Seeing Is Believing	The senses	19'56"	325350	Unknown	Gloria Ajenstat	Rosco and Krystal are off on a treasure hunt sparked off by the discovery of an old, but badly worn, coin on a local beach. Investigations are made at the local historical society. They also clean the coin in search of a date or other information. Vortex and Plankton think it might lead to buried treasure. Their reading introduces the possibility of a curse on the treasure. When the lights go out, windows break and the coin disappears during a storm they are convinced that 'one-armed Silus' is surely about. Krystal, a bit more logical about the situation, charts the possibilities. This involves a systematic examination of the information registered by each of the senses.	14	1984	1991	
83/28	Night Moves	Animal tracks and traces	19'32"	325357	Unknown	Denzil Howson	Something is killing 'chooks' on a small country farm. Foxes seem to be the logical choice. The culprits must be identified but the chook pen also needs to be improved. Rosco and Krystal set out to do both. They discover that the chooks are being attacked by an abandoned and hungry cat. Vortex and Plankton in their own fashion design an alarm that will drive away any intruders!	12	1984	1991	
83/29											No episode 83/29 was produced.
83/30											No episode 83/30 was produced.
83/31	Make Or Break	Electrical circuits	19'14"	325368	Unknown	John Frawley; Julia Blake	Lord Beavercroft is having troubles - someone is sabotaging his excellent electric railway system. Lord Beavercroft is of the opinion that someone has broken in to do this so Rosco and Krystal establish an alarm system to catch the culprit. Vortex and Plankton, on overhearing the talk about alarms set out to design their own. As usual it turns out to be ingenious but completely unworkable.	16	1984	1991	
83/32	Blazing Sandshoes	Fitness	19'49"	325356	Unknown	David Allshorn	Rosco and Krystal are involved in an exercise program, mainly because of Krystal's interest in fitness. This leads to Rosco and Vortex deciding to see who can perform better in a distance race. The program follows the two in their preparation for, and participation in, the race. Along the way various aspects of fitness and ways of measuring them are illustrated.	13	1984	1991	
83/33	The Missing Possums Bureau	Habitat	19'55"	325354	Unknown	Frank Wilson	A wealthy man asks Kris and Rosco to find out why there aren't any sugar gliders on his property anymore. Vortex decides to teach regular possums how to fly.	13	1984	1991	
84/1	The Guitar Case	Sound and musical instruments	19'56"	325355	Unknown	Bob Ruggiero; Ed Turley; Peter Moon; Rob McLennan	Rosco's Uncle Clem appears on a TV musical contest program but has trouble keeping his new guitar in tune. This problem leads to the appearance of two mystery men, smuggled diamonds and a detailed look at the various factors which could cause the pitch of the guitar to vary. Vortex and Plankton meanwhile explore the world of sound as they attempt to win a competition for the most unusual musical instrument. As might be expected Vortex has no real trouble in devising an unusual instrument but will it work?	16	1984	1991	This episode has the same episode number as the episode "That Which Never Rests".
84/1	That Which Never Rests	Perpetual motion	19'46"	325369	Unknown	Christina Anderson; Gloria Ajenstat; Les Carter; Peter Black	An old newspaper article leads Krystal into an investigation of a machine that supplies its own power to drive it. Krystal decides to make a model of the machine but has no luck in getting it to keep turning. Efforts to reduce friction and add lubrication generate no great advances. Krystal realises at last that it is scientifically impossible: no actual system with moving parts can be completely friction-free. Vortex decides that he has the answer to a perpetual motion machine and advertises a public demonstration. When problems arise Plankton, as usual, is in the trouble spot.	13	1984	1991	This episode has the same episode number as the episode "The Guitar Case" and the same production number as the episode "Great Balls Of Pumpkin".
84/2	Great Balls Of Pumpkin	Plant nutrition	19'55"	325369	Unknown	Val Lehman; Colin Vancao; Shane Bourne; Alan Knoepfler	Krystal is on her own in this episode. Reg Legume has won the world pumpkin growing competition. However, he doesn't know what caused the pumpkin to grow so well. He invites Infinity Ltd to find the factors causing such large growth, Vortex and Plankton become involved. Vortex decides, after a 'vision', to grow pumpkins by Hydroponics, i.e. without soil. When this doesn't work Vortex loses interest in plant nutrition and switches to deception.	13	1984	1991	This episode has the same production number as the episode "That Which Never Rests". Rosco does not appear in this episode.
84/3	The Invisible Force	Air pressure	19'47"	325371	Unknown	Marilyn O'Donnell; Jay McCormack; John Howard; Peter Black	Krystal's friend is to make a film that includes a scene in which aliens destroy oil storage tanks. The problem is lack of finance for spectacular special effects so Krystal is asked to help. Her answer is quite spectacular but simple - luckily she too knows about air pressure. Vortex and Plankton (and Vortex's nephew Algie) are also involved in trying to find a way to 'destroy' the storage tanks. In their investigations they explore a variety of effects that relate to air pressure. Some of these explorations get them into trouble, as may be expected.	12	1984	1991	
84/4	Wheels Within Wheels	Expansion of metals	18'46"	325372	Unknown	Unknown	The Vortex family is to have a wedding and efforts to open the safe containing the family ring lead to Vortex thinking about events from the past. It is surprising how the characters from the past resemble so strikingly those from Infinity Ltd. and Vortex Ventures. The flashback concerns a bride on the way to a wedding and the groom preparing for the wedding. The bride's carriage loses a steel tyre from the wooden wheel and the driver (looking very much like Rosco), with the help of the bride and a bit of heat from a fire, manages to fit a 'spare" metal tyre by heating it in a fire, fitting it onto the wheel and shrinking it tight with cold water. The groom has trouble with a lid that won't come off the metal container (supposedly holding the family ring). He solves the problem but the ring is missing — this seems as though it may have strong influences on the future...	12	1984	1991	An episode where the lead actors play different roles.
84/5	What's This Space	Measuring volume	20'00"	325373	Unknown	David Argue; Ernie Bourne; Roger Davy	The 'Pig Pen', a new disco, is almost ready for the big opening. Then the Council Inspector puts a damper on the plan. The large pig sculpture, the centre-piece of the display, may occupy too much space. Before he will give his permission for the opening the exact volume of the pig must be determined. Krystal, and Vortex and Plankton, set out to find a way to measure the volume - the inspector will not accept an estimate. Several methods are suggested before the answer is found in a swimming pool (by lowering the pig into it and measuring the amount of water displaced). The disco opens as planned and all enjoy the first night.	12	1984	1991	
84/6	Bubble, Bubble, Toil And Trouble	Fermentation	18'12"	325374	Unknown	Unknown	Christmas is near. Vortex is in trouble because relations are supposed to be coming, the fridge is broken and the food has gone off. Krystal, on the other hand, has gone to visit her friend Zac on his farm and will spend Christmas there. At the farm Zac is having trouble with home-made ginger beer. In trying to find the solution to the problem, Krystal has to learn a lot about yeast and fermentation. The answer is found but in the night a few problems arise. Meanwhile Vortex and Plankton are also trying to make ginger beer but Vortex has to help the situations by the production of a special bottling machine. The troubles on the farm are minor compared to those left in the basement when Vortex and Plankton set out to spend Christmas on the farm where they hope to get a good Christmas dinner.	12	1984	1991	
