= Hanging Together =

- Written by: Gordon Grahame
- Directed by: John Ruane
- Starring: Gary Day; Pat Evison
- Country of origin: Australia
- Original language: English

Production
- Producer: Hugh Rule
- Running time: 96 mins
- Production company: Australian Film Theatre

Original release
- Release: 1985

Hanging Together is a 1985 Australian film about the second-last man hanged in Australia and a television reporter who uses an impending marriage as a means to pursue his obsession. Gordon Grahame's script was based on his own play which had achieved success in Sydney in 1984.
