= Kim Trengove =

Australian actress

- Born: 1958 or 1959 (age 67–68); Australia
- Education: RMIT University (1980–1983); Victorian College of the Arts (1984–1986); Swinburne University of Technology (1992)
- Occupations: Actress, journalist
- Years active: 1978–2001

Kim Trengove (born 1958 or 1959) is an Australian actress and journalist.

== Early life and education ==
After beginning a cadetship in journalism in 1978, Trengove simultaneously studied a Diploma in Journalism at RMIT University from 1980 to 1983. She then studied a Bachelor of Performing Arts at the Victorian College of the Arts (VCA) from 1984, graduating in 1986.

== Career ==
=== Film, television and stage ===
Trengove's first role was in an episode of Cop Shop in 1979. She then appeared as Belle in the 1980 miniseries The Last Outlaw.

Trengove remains best known for her recurring role as Rachel Milsom in cult television drama series Prisoner for 21 episodes in 1984. That same year she starred as Kristal in two seasons of the short-lived ABC science education series Infinity Limited for 19 episodes. She later appeared in two recurring guest roles in long-running soap opera Neighbours in 1995 and 2000, respectively. She also wrote a 1996 episode of Neighbours.

Trengove's other television credits include The Sullivans, Sons and Daughters, Carson's Law, A Country Practice, The Flying Doctors, Col'n Carpenter, Janus, Wedlocked, Blue Heelers and Stingers.

She also appeared in the 1977 Bruce Beresford film The Getting of Wisdom based on the 1910 novel of the same name, 1982 thriller Desolation Angels and 1983 drover film Dusty.

Trengove appeared in numerous stage productions in Melbourne, with theatre companies including Melbourne Theatre Company, Theatre Works, and La Mama. She also toured with the cabaret act, The Globos, who supported Cliff Richard in his Gold Tour of Australia in the 1980s.

Furthering her skills in film, Trengove studied scriptwriting at Swinburne University of Technology in 1992. More recently, in 2019, Trengove was studying film-making, renewing her passion for the industry.

Trengove also wrote a book, "Out of Character: Conversations with Australian Actors", published by Penguin Books in 1990, based on interviews with prominent Australian actors about their life and work in the industry.

=== Journalism ===
A trained newspaper journalist, Trengove began working as a cadet journalist at Herald and Weekly Times (Melbourne Sun) in 1978. She remained there until 1983. From 1978 to 2000, she worked as a regular feature writer editor Fairfax Media, for publications including Australian Tennis Magazine and New Idea. She covered tennis for the Davis Cup and managed Pat Rafter's official website. Trengove worked for Tennis Australia for 17 years, including as Senior Manager of the Digital and Publishing for nearly nine years. In 2019, she started working as a social media content producer for the Laver Cup and a Digital Content Manager for Australian Men's Health Forum.

Trengove has also been a lecturer, teaching short courses in magazine and freelance journalism at RMIT University and Box Hill Institute, from 1996 to 2001.

== Filmography ==
=== Film ===
| Year | Title | Role | Notes |
|---|---|---|---|
| 1982 | Desolation Angels | Jilly | |
| 1983 | Dusty | Barmaid | |

=== Television ===
| Year | Title | Role | Notes |
|---|---|---|---|
| 1979 | Cop Shop | Debbie | 1 episode |
| 1980 | The Last Outlaw | Belle | Miniseries, 4 episodes |
| 1981 | The Sullivans | Judy | 1 episode |
| 1982 | Sons and Daughters | Receptionist | 1 episode |
| 1983 | Carson's Law | Mavis Phipps / Lily Patterson | 2 episodes |
| 1984 | Prisoner | Rachel Milsom | 21 episodes |
| 1984 | Infinity Limited | Kristal | 19 episodes |
| 1986 | A Country Practice | Rosanne Kay | 2 episodes |
| 1988 | The Flying Doctors | Gina Collins | 1 episode |
| 1990 | Col'n Carpenter | Antenatal Instructor | 1 episode |
| 1994 | Janus | Jules | 1 episode |
| 1994 | Wedlocked | Beth | 1 episode |
| 1995; 2000 | Neighbours | Sandy Morris / Rachel Jones | 7 episodes |
| 1998; 2000 | Blue Heelers | Irene Johnstone / Natalie Finch | 2 episodes |
| 2001 | Stingers | Margaret Whittle | 1 episode |

== Theatre ==
| Year | Title | Role | Notes |
|---|---|---|---|
| 1981 | When Lips Collide | Lucille Ball | Playbox Theatre, Melbourne |
| 1986 | Compulsive Viewing | Executive / Sandy / Dorianna Falacci / Joan Wentworth | Studio 1, Theatre Building, Melbourne with Victorian College of the Arts |
| 1987 | Shimada | Jan / Geisha | Russell Street Theatre, Melbourne with MTC |
| 1987 | A Chorus of Disapproval | Linda Washbrook | Playhouse, Melbourne, Canberra Theatre with MTC |
| 1988 | After Dinner | Dympie | La Mama, Melbourne, Theatre Works, Melbourne, Universal Theatre, Melbourne with Hocking & Woods |
| | Even Cows Get the Blues | | Murray River Performing Group |
| 1989 | The Recruiting Officer | Lucy | Playhouse, Melbourne with MTC |
| 1989; 1990 | Our Country's Good | Lt George Johnson / Dabby | Playhouse, Melbourne, Playhouse, Adelaide with MTC |
| 1990 | Nana | | Russell Street Theatre, Melbourne with MTC |
| 1992 | Fix it, Alice! | | St Martins Theatre, Melbourne, Victorian regional tour with Arena Theatre Company |
| 1992 | Fossils | | Arena Theatre, Melbourne |
| 1992 | Bring Down the House | Rita | Malthouse Theatre, Melbourne with Arena Theatre Company |
| 1993 | The Stiff | | La Mama, Melbourne |
