= Desolation Angels (1982 film) =

- Directed by: Chris Fitchett
- Written by: Chris Fitchett; Ellery Ryan
- Produced by: Chris Oliver
- Starring: Kim Trengove
- Cinematography: Ellery Ryan
- Production company: Winternight Productions
- Release date: 1982
- Running time: 95 minutes
- Country: Australia
- Language: English
- Budget: A$500,000

Desolation Angels is a 1982 Australian film about three high school students who borrow a weekender house in Portsea and are terrorised by some thugs.

It was shot in March and April 1982.

The title is a reference to a novel written by Beat Generation author Jack Kerouac.

In recent years the film has changed its title to 'Fair Game', not to be confused with the 1985 Australian feature film that features actress/singer Cassandra Delaney in the lead role.

== Cast ==
- Kim Trengove as Jilly
- Kerry Mack as Joanne
- Marie O'Loughlin as Liz
- Karen West as Pamela Wilkinson
- Jay Mannering as Vince
- Nield Schneider as Trevor
- Nico Lathouris as Nightman
- Nik Forster as Brian
- Louise Howitt as Susan
- Monica Maughan as Liz's Mother
- Robert Hewett as Motorcycle Cop
- Tony Mahood as Constable Bill
- Doug Bowles as 1st Apprentice
- David Reyne as 2nd Apprentice
- Robbie McGregor as Bank Manager
