= Memoir of a Snail =

2024 Australian animated film

- Theatrical release poster
- Directed by: Adam Elliot
- Written by: Adam Elliot
- Produced by: Liz Kearney; Adam Elliot
- Starring: Sarah Snook; Kodi Smit-McPhee; Eric Bana; Magda Szubanski; Dominique Pinon; Tony Armstrong; Paul Capsis; Bernie Clifford; Davey Thompson; Charlotte Belsey; Mason Litsos; Nick Cave; Jacki Weaver
- Cinematography: Gerald Thompson
- Edited by: Bill Murphy
- Music by: Elena Kats-Chernin
- Production companies: Screen Australia; VicScreen; Melbourne International Film Festival Premiere Fund; Arenamedia; Soundfirm; Anton; Charades; Snails Pace Films
- Distributed by: Madman Entertainment
- Release dates: 10 June 2024 (Annecy); 17 October 2024 (Australia)
- Running time: 95 minutes
- Country: Australia
- Language: English
- Budget: $4.5 million
- Box office: $7.6 million

Memoir of a Snail is a 2024 Australian adult stop-motion animated tragicomedy film written, produced and directed by Adam Elliot. It stars the voices of Sarah Snook, Kodi Smit-McPhee, Eric Bana, Magda Szubanski, Dominique Pinon, Tony Armstrong, Paul Capsis, Nick Cave, and Jacki Weaver. The film's plot, which is loosely inspired by Elliot's own life, follows the trials and tribulations in the life of lonely misfit Grace Pudel, from childhood to adulthood.

The film had its world premiere at the 2024 Annecy International Animation Film Festival on 10 June 2024, and was released in Australia by Madman Entertainment on 17 October 2024. The film received critical acclaim and was nominated for Best Animated Feature at the 97th Academy Awards, the second R-rated animated film to be nominated after Anomalisa (2015), another stop-motion film.

== Plot ==
Grace Pudel is a young girl in 1970s Melbourne, Australia, who lives with her twin brother Gilbert and their French father Percy, a former juggler who is now a paraplegic alcoholic. She develops a hobby of collecting snails, which she shares with her mother who died in childbirth. The twins have a close and supportive relationship, and Gilbert defends Grace from schoolmates who tease her for her cleft lip.

When Percy dies from sleep apnea, the twins are separated and sent to foster homes on different sides of the country. Grace is sent to Canberra where she is raised by Ian and Narelle, who are kind but are often absent due to being swingers. Gilbert is sent to a farming family of religious fundamentalists in Perth, who treat him with cruelty and abuse, particularly from the matriarch Ruth. Over the years, Gilbert writes letters to Grace, promising to find and reunite with her when he grows up. While this hope keeps her going, Grace is unable to form any connections and passions in her life in Canberra. This results in her obsessively purchasing and hoarding any snail-themed products and collectibles she finds.

As a teenager, Grace eventually befriends an eccentric but kind elderly woman named Pinky, who always finds silver linings in her life despite some misfortunes, such as losing two husbands, many jobs and even a pinky finger, hence her name. When Ian and Narelle retire to join a nudist group, Pinky becomes Grace's foster mother, continuing to support her through puberty despite her still feeling depressed and aimless. Meanwhile, Gilbert continues to suffer abuse from his foster family, with only the youngest son Ben treating him with fondness and admiration for his rebelliousness.

Upon becoming an adult, Grace falls in love with Ken, a new neighbour who is a microwave repairman. The two quickly start a loving relationship, eventually leading to him proposing to her. However, on the day of their wedding, Grace receives a letter from Ruth, reporting that Gilbert has died in a fire, which he started in a rage after a homophobic Ruth subjected him and Ben to electric shock treatment upon discovering the two boys kissing. Grace is distraught by his death, becoming more depressed as her hoarding and overeating increase, leading to her being caught stealing and having to appear in court. Grace is further shocked when she discovers Ken's scrapbook, revealing that he has a fetish for large women and that he has been overfeeding her on purpose. She breaks up with him, leaving only Pinky to care for her and help her lose weight. Grace also comes to regret using her money on snail paraphernalia rather than finding Gilbert when he was still alive.

Sometime later, Pinky is diagnosed with Alzheimer's disease, leading Grace to become the one taking care of her. Pinky eventually dies after a few months, her final words being "The potatoes!", to Grace's confusion. Grace brings her ashes to Pinky's vegetable garden and sets her jar of snails free. Now alone with nothing to live for, Grace decides to commit suicide by eating poison, but she spits it out at the last second upon realising that Pinky was taking about her potato patch. Grace finds a box buried, and within is a letter from Pinky, thanking Grace for their years together and encouraging her to live a new life unclouded by her past struggles and traumas, along with all of Pinky's life savings. Grace strives to follow her advice, beginning with disposing of and burning her snail-themed collection, keeping only the snail beanie made for her by Percy and her mother's snail figurines. During her trial, the judge lets her off without punishment, remembering that she had helped him years earlier when he was homeless.

A year later, Grace lives a stable life, pursuing her dream of being a stop-motion animator. At a screening of her short film, Gilbert reveals himself to her, having survived the fire and found his way to her. After their tearful reunion, the twins live happily together again and finally fulfil their late father's wish of having his ashes scattered while on a rollercoaster at Luna Park, the amusement park they went to as children.

== Voice cast ==
- Sarah Snook as Grace Pudel, a melancholic outcast who develops a hobby of snails
  - Charlotte Belsey as Young Grace
- Kodi Smit-McPhee as Gilbert Pudel, the twin brother of Grace
  - Mason Litsos as Young Gilbert
- Jacki Weaver as Pinky, a former table dancer who befriends Grace
- Eric Bana as James, a magistrate
- Magda Szubanski as Ruth Appleby, Gilbert's religious and abusive foster mother
- Dominique Pinon as Percy Pudel, the father of Grace and Gilbert
- Tony Armstrong as Ken, a repairman who Grace briefly marries
- Paul Capsis as Ian and Narelle, a swinger couple who become Grace's foster parents
- Bernie Clifford as Owen Appleby, Gilbert's religious foster father
- Davey Thompson as Ben Appleby, Gilbert's foster brother
- Nick Cave as Bill Clarke, Pinky's second husband

== Production ==
Memoir of a Snail was developed over an eight-year period. Filming occurred in Melbourne in May 2023. In February 2024, it was announced that Sarah Snook was cast as the lead.

== Release ==
Memoir of a Snail premiered on 10 June 2024 at the Annecy International Animation Film Festival, where it won the Cristal Award for a Feature Film. The film was released in Australia by Madman Entertainment on 17 October 2024, and was released in select theatres in the United States by IFC Films on 25 October, followed by a wider release in November.

== Reception ==
=== Critical response ===
On the review aggregator website Rotten Tomatoes, 95% of 146 critics' reviews are positive, with an average rating of 8.2/10. The website's consensus reads: "This stop motion odyssey of hope triumphing over life's despair with humanity to spare makes Memoir of a Snail a deft, heartfelt tale." Metacritic, which uses a weighted average, assigned the film a score of 81 out of 100, based on 25 critics, indicating "universal acclaim".

Peter Debruge of Variety commended director Adam Elliot's dedication to a "dark and surprisingly moving brand of storytelling" and praised the film's voice cast and score. In Deadline, Stephanie Bunbury noted repetitive elements of the plot and dialogue but argued that these flaws underscored the film's themes of human imperfection.

=== Accolades ===
Award	Ceremony date	Category	Recipient	Result	Ref.
Annecy International Animation Film Festival	15 June 2024	Cristal Award for a Feature Film	Memoir of a Snail	Won	
Ottawa International Animation Festival	28 September 2024	Grand Prize for Animated Feature	Memoir of a Snail	Nominated	
Ottawa International Animation Festival	28 September 2024	Grand Prize for Animated Feature – Special Mention	Memoir of a Snail	Won	
Sitges Film Festival	13 October 2024	Best Animated Feature Film	Memoir of a Snail	Won	
Mill Valley Film Festival	16 October 2024	MVFF Animation Award	Memoir of a Snail	Won	
BFI London Film Festival	20 October 2024	Best Film	Memoir of a Snail	Won	
Asia Pacific Screen Awards	30 November 2024	Best Animated Film	Adam Elliot, Liz Kearney	Nominated	
Astra Film Awards	8 December 2024	Best Animated Feature	Memoir of a Snail	Nominated	
Washington D.C. Area Film Critics Association	8 December 2024	Best Animated Feature	Memoir of a Snail	Nominated	
San Diego Film Critics Society	9 December 2024	Best Animated Film	Memoir of a Snail	Nominated	
Chicago Film Critics Association	12 December 2024	Best Animated Film	Memoir of a Snail	Nominated	
St. Louis Film Critics Association	15 December 2024	Best Animated Feature	Memoir of a Snail	Nominated	
San Francisco Bay Area Film Critics Circle	15 December 2024	Best Animated Feature	Memoir of a Snail	Nominated	
Toronto Film Critics Association	15 December 2024	Best Animated Film	Memoir of a Snail	Runner-up	
New York Film Critics Online	16 December 2024	Best Animation	Memoir of a Snail	Nominated	
Florida Film Critics Circle	20 December 2024	Best Animated Film	Memoir of a Snail	Nominated	
Austin Film Critics Association	6 January 2025	Best Animated Film	Memoir of a Snail	Nominated	
Austin Film Critics Association	6 January 2025	Best Voice Acting/Animated/Digital Performance	Sarah Snook	Nominated	
Golden Globe Awards	5 January 2025	Best Animated Feature Film	Memoir of a Snail	Nominated	
Satellite Awards	26 January 2025	Best Motion Picture – Animated or Mixed Media	Memoir of a Snail	Nominated	
Critics' Choice Movie Awards	7 February 2025	Best Animated Feature	Memoir of a Snail	Nominated	
AACTA Awards	7 February 2025	Best Film	Liz Kearney, Adam Elliot	Nominated	
AACTA Awards	7 February 2025	Best Direction	Adam Elliot	Nominated	
AACTA Awards	7 February 2025	Best Screenplay in Film	Adam Elliot	Nominated	
AACTA Awards	7 February 2025	Best Lead Actor	Kodi Smit-McPhee	Nominated	
AACTA Awards	7 February 2025	Best Lead Actress	Sarah Snook	Won	
AACTA Awards	7 February 2025	Best Supporting Actress	Jacki Weaver	Won	
AACTA Awards	7 February 2025	Best Cinematography	Gerald Thompson	Nominated	
AACTA Awards	7 February 2025	Best Editing	Bill Murphy	Nominated	
AACTA Awards	7 February 2025	Best Original Music Score	Elena Kats-Chernin	Nominated	
AACTA Awards	7 February 2025	Best Sound	David Williams, Andy Wright, Lee Yee, Dylan Burgess	Nominated	
AACTA Awards	7 February 2025	Best Production Design	Adam Elliot	Nominated	
Annie Awards	8 February 2025	Best Animated Feature — Independent	Memoir of a Snail	Nominated	
Annie Awards	8 February 2025	Outstanding Achievement for Writing in an Animated Feature Production	Adam Elliot	Nominated	
Alliance of Women Film Journalists	January 7, 2025	Best Animated Film	Memoir of a Snail	Nominated	
Alliance of Women Film Journalists	January 7, 2025	Best Animated/Voice Performance	Sarah Snook	Nominated	
Alliance of Women Film Journalists	January 7, 2025	Best Animated/Voice Performance	Jacki Weaver	Nominated	
Academy Awards	2 March 2025	Best Animated Feature	Adam Elliot and Liz Kearney	Nominated	
Golden Trailer Awards	29 May 2025	Best Foreign Animation/Family	Madman Films / Intermission Film (for "Official Trailer")	Nominated	
Golden Trailer Awards	29 May 2025	Best Animation TrailerByte for a Feature Film	IFC Films / Intermission Film (for "Meet Pinky")	Nominated	

== See also ==
- Harvie Krumpet and Mary and Max, other claymation films directed by Adam Elliot
- List of Australian films
