= Ken McKaige =

Australian rules footballer

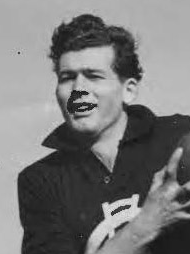

Personal information
- Full name: Ken McKaige
- Born: 17 August 1929
- Died: 26 September 2009 (aged 80)
- Original team: Old Melburnians
- Height: 187 cm (6 ft 2 in)
- Weight: 80.5 kg (177 lb)

Playing career^{1}
Years	Club	Games (Goals)
1951–52	Melbourne	9 (1)
1953–54	Carlton	10 (0)
Total		19 (1)
- ^{1} Playing statistics correct to the end of 1954.

Ken McKaige (17 August 1929 – 26 September 2009) was an Australian rules footballer who played with Melbourne and Carlton in the Victorian Football League (VFL).

He was delisted by the Blues and crossed to Camberwell in the VFA for the 1955 season, where he played only another handful of matches before hanging up his boots for good.

Two of McKaige's sons also played for Melbourne Football Club as juniors. His other sons were both signed to the club at young ages to ensure they were not residentially tied to another club. Cameron was only 5 years old at the time. Andrew McKaige went on to be an Australian television actor.
