= Coming of Age (1984 film) =

- Directed by: Brian Jones
- Written by: David King; Brian Jones
- Produced by: Brian Jones
- Starring: Angela Menzies-Wills
- Cinematography: John Ruane
- Production company: Brookvale Productions
- Release date: 1984
- Running time: 98 mins
- Country: Australia
- Language: English

Coming of Age is a 1984 Australian film. It is now known as a very hard to find film which is highly sought after by collectors and lovers of Australian films.

Seasoned Australian softcore porn actress Angela Menzies-Wills plays the lead role of Angel.

== Cast ==
- Angela Menzies-Wills as Angel
- David Argue as Stoned Cabbie / Street Monster
