= Feathers (1987 film) =

1987 film

- Directed by: John Ruane
- Written by: John Ruane; Raymond Carver
- Starring: James Laurie
- Cinematography: Ellery Ryan
- Edited by: Ken Sallows
- Release date: May 1987
- Running time: 60 minutes
- Country: Australia
- Language: English

Feathers is a 1987 Australian drama film directed by John Ruane. It was screened out of competition at the 1987 Cannes Film Festival. Ruane says his work on this film got him the job of directing Dead Letter Office.

== Cast ==
- James Laurie as James
- Neil Melville as Bert
- Rebecca Gilling as Fran
- Julie Forsyth as Olla
- John Flaus as Doug
- Simon Westaway as TV Race Car Announcer
