= Chris Fitchett =

Australian writer, producer and script editor

Chris Fitchett is an Australian writer, producer and script editor.

He has worked for many years a development and production executive for state and federal government film funding agencies including Project Manager/Deputy Director of Film Victoria, CEO of the Commercial Television Production Fund, and Chief Executive of the Australian Film Commission.

He teaches at Bond University.

== Select credits ==
- Melanie and Me (1975) - producer, director
- Queensland (1976) - producer
- Blood Money (1980) - director, writer
- Desolation Angels (1982) - director, writer
- Cassandra (1987) - writer
- The 13th Floor (1988) - script editor
- Quads (2001–02) (TV series) - script editor
- Blurred (2002) - producer
- Under the Radar (2003) - producer
- Stoned Bros (2009) - script editor
- A Heartbeat Away (2011) - producer
- The Fear of Darkness (2015) - writer, director, executive producer
