= Mary and Max =

2009 clay animation film directed by Adam Elliot

- Australian theatrical release poster
- Directed by: Adam Elliot
- Written by: Adam Elliot
- Produced by: Melanie Coombs
- Starring: Toni Collette; Philip Seymour Hoffman; Eric Bana
- Narrated by: Barry Humphries
- Cinematography: Gerald Thompson
- Edited by: Bill Murphy
- Music by: Dale Cornelius
- Production companies: Screen Australia; Melodrama Pictures; Film Victoria; SBS Television Australia; Adirondack Pictures
- Distributed by: Icon Entertainment International
- Release dates: 15 January 2009 (Sundance Film Festival); 9 April 2009 (Australia)
- Running time: 90 minutes
- Country: Australia
- Languages: English; Yiddish
- Budget: A$8.2 million
- Box office: US$1.7 million

Mary and Max is a 2009 Australian adult animated tragicomedy film written and directed by Adam Elliot. The film was produced by Melanie Coombs and Melodrama Pictures with music by Dale Cornelius. The voice cast includes Philip Seymour Hoffman, Toni Collette, Eric Bana and Bethany Whitmore, with narration provided by Barry Humphries.

The film follows the lives and friendship of two unlikely pen pals; Mary, a lonely Australian girl, and Max, a middle-aged American man with Asperger syndrome. The film is inspired by Elliot's relationship with his pen pal in New York whom he has been writing to for over twenty years.

The film premiered on the opening night of the 2009 Sundance Film Festival on 15 January 2009. The film won the Annecy Cristal in June 2009 from the Annecy International Animated Film Festival and Best Animated Feature Film at the Asia Pacific Screen Awards in November 2009. The film was also nominated for both the AACTA Award for Best Film and the AACTA Award for Best Original Screenplay in December 2009. The film was theatrically released on 9 April 2009, by Icon Entertainment International; it received acclaim from critics.

== Plot ==
In 1976, eight-year-old Mary Daisy Dinkle lives a lonely life in Mount Waverley, Victoria, Australia. Her classmates tease her because of the color of a birthmark on her forehead and her distant father, Noel, and alcoholic, kleptomaniac mother, Vera, provide little support. Her only comforts are her pet rooster, Ethel; her favourite food, sweetened condensed milk; and a Smurfs-like cartoon called The Noblets. While at the post office with her mother, Mary spots a New York City telephone book and, curious about Americans, decides to write to one. She randomly chooses Max Jerry Horowitz from the phone book and sends him a letter telling him about herself.

Max is an overweight 44-year-old Jewish atheist who has trouble forming relationships due to various mental problems and a lack of social skills. Mary's letter initially gives him an anxiety attack, but he writes back, and the two become friends (partly due to their shared love of chocolate and The Noblets). Vera disapproves of Max due to the contents of his letter to Mary, so Mary tells him to send his letters to her neighbour Len Hislop. Mary asks Max about love and sex after hearing of it from one of her school peers, and he suffers a severe anxiety attack, being institutionalised for eight months. Upon being discharged, he wins the lottery and uses the money to buy a lifetime supply of chocolate and a collection of Noblet figurines, fulfilling two of his lifetime goals. He gives the remainder to his elderly neighbour, Ivy, who pampers herself before dying in an accident. Mary becomes despondent, thinking Max has abandoned her.

Max writes back to Mary, explaining he has been diagnosed with Asperger syndrome and describing several aspects of it which effect his life. The two continue their correspondence for the next several years. When Noel retires, he takes up metal detecting and is swept away while on a beach. The now-adult Mary goes to the University of Melbourne. She has her birthmark removed and develops a crush on her neighbour Damien Popodopoulos. While grieving over her husband, Vera accidentally grabs and drinks a bottle of embalming fluid instead of her cooking sherry, dying as a result. Mary and Damien later marry, although Damien is shown to be uncomfortable being intimate with her.

Mary studies psychology and writes her doctoral dissertation on finding a cure for Asperger syndrome with Max as her case study, despite his previous statements about not needing or wanting to be cured. She sends Max a copy and he is left furious, believing she has taken advantage of him. He breaks off communication with Mary by removing the letter "M" from his typewriter and mailing it to her. In response, Mary has the entire run of her book shredded, ending her career as a writer. She becomes depressed and begins drinking, to the point of becoming just like her mother in the process. She finds a can of condensed milk and writes "I'm Sorry" on it, sending it to Max as an apology. Afterwards, she finds a letter from Damien informing her that he has left her for his own pen pal, New Zealand sheep farmer Desmond, as a result of her depression.

After strangling a homeless man in anger over him throwing a cigarettebutt on the ground, Max finds that everyone is imperfect, including himself. He sends Mary his Noblet figurine collection as a gesture of forgiveness. Mary fails to find the box on her doorstep for several days. Unaware she is pregnant with Damien's child, Mary tries to commit suicide. Having conquered his agoraphobia, Len interrupts her suicide and alerts her of Max's package, and Mary decides not to continue her attempt. A letter from Max tells her of his realisation that they are not perfect. He states how much their friendship means to him and hopes their paths will cross one day.

One year later, Mary travels to New York with her infant child to visit Max. However, upon entering his apartment, Mary discovers Max dead on his couch, gazing upward and smiling. Mary finds all the letters she sent Max over the years taped to the ceiling. Seeing how much Max valued their friendship, Mary cries tears of joy as she sits beside him on the couch.

== Cast ==
- Barry Humphries as the Narrator
- Toni Collette as Mary Daisy Dinkle
  - Bethany Whitmore as Young Mary.
- Philip Seymour Hoffman as Max Jerry Horowitz
- Eric Bana as Damien Popodopoulos
- Renée Geyer as Vera Lorraine Dinkle.
- Ian Meldrum as Homeless Man.
- Michael Ienna as Lincoln (uncredited).
- Julie Forsyth, John Flaus, Christopher Massey, Shaun Patten, Leanne Smith and Carolyn Shakespeare-Allen as additional voices.

== Production ==
=== Development ===
According to the opening credits, the film is based on a true story. In an interview, writer-director Elliot clarified that the character of Max was inspired by "a pen-friend in New York who I've been writing to for over twenty years." Principal photography lasted over 57 weeks, using 133 separate sets, 212 puppets, and 475 miniature props, "including a fully functioning Underwood typewriter which apparently took nine weeks to design and build."

=== Themes ===
The film deals with themes including child neglect, friendship, addiction, alcoholism, recovery, the obscurity of life, teasing, loneliness, mental illness, autism, obesity, suicide, depression, isolation, and anxiety.

== Music ==
The music features Simon Jeffes and the Penguin Cafe Orchestra's "Perpetuum Mobile" (the opening theme) and "Prelude and Yodel", as well as "Russian Rag" by Elena Kats-Chernin. The closing-credits music is "A Swingin' Safari" by Bert Kaempfert and his Orchestra. Other artists include Nana Mouskouri, Dale Cornelius, Leroy Anderson, Pink Martini, London Pops Orchestra, James Last and his Orchestra, The King's Consort and Choir, the Sydney Alpha Ensemble, and the ABC Radio Orchestra.

The film includes the Pink Martini version of Doris Day's song, "Que Sera Sera", which is played over Mary's attempted suicide scene.

The CD Mary and Max: Music from the Motion Picture was released 1 May 2009.

== Reception ==
=== Critical response ===
Mary and Max received acclaim from critics. Rotten Tomatoes gives the film an approval rating of 96% based on 67 reviews, with an average rating of 8.30/10. The consensus reads, "Mary and Max is a lovingly crafted, startlingly inventive piece of animation whose technical craft is equaled by its emotional resonance." Metacritic, which uses a weighted average, assigned the film a score of 72 out of 100, based on 7 critics, indicating "generally favorable" reviews.

Matt Ravier, writing for In Film Australia, said the "story is paper-thin and some stretches of it are simply too long, yet whenever the narrative thread threatens to tear, the sheer authenticity and bold honesty of the characters save the day". The Los Angeles Times called it a "remarkable and poignant" film depicting a "film noir world of blacks, whites and grays for Max and a sepia suburbia for Mary".

After the film was released on DVD in the United States, Slant said "Adam Elliot's dry wit is pervasive throughout Mary and Max and it's nice to see that this unique sense of humor extends to the extras. The writer-director gives a funny and informative audio commentary and a set of hilarious making-of episodes reflects the sardonic tone of the production. The big prize here, however, is the addition of Elliot's Oscar-winning short Harvie Krumpet. This Geoffrey Rush-narrated tale of the titular Tourette syndrome sufferer is a wonderful introduction both to Elliot's sensibilities and to Mary and Max's specific tone."

=== Box office ===
Mary and Max grossed $1,444,617 at the Australian box office. The film received no general theatrical release in the United States, though it was showcased at several American film festivals, and was briefly shown at one of the Laemmle Theatres in the Los Angeles area. The film's U.S. distributor (IFC Films) made the film available on DVD and through video on demand. The film was released in France by Gaumont and in Germany by MFA

=== Awards ===
| Award | Category | Recipient | Result |
|---|---|---|---|
| Asia Pacific Screen Award | Best Animated Feature Film | Melanie Coombs | Won |
| Australian Directors Guild | Best Direction in a Feature Film | Adam Elliot | Won |
| AACTA Awards (2009 AFI Awards) | AFI Members' Choice Award | Melanie Coombs | Nominated |
| AACTA Awards (2009 AFI Awards) | Best Film | Melanie Coombs | Nominated |
| AACTA Awards (2009 AFI Awards) | Best Original Screenplay | Adam Elliot | Nominated |
| AACTA Awards (2009 AFI Awards) | Best Production Design | Adam Elliot | Nominated |
| Berlin International Film Festival | Glass Bear | Adam Elliot | Honorable mention |
| BAFICI Award | Best Film | Adam Elliot | Nominated |
| FCCA Award | Best Director | Adam Elliot | Nominated |
| International Cinephile Society Award | Best Animated Film | | Nominated |
| Imagine Film Festival | Silver Scream Award | Adam Elliot | Won |
| Ottawa International Animation Festival | Grand Prize | Adam Elliot | Won |

== Home media ==
Mary and Max was released on DVD on 26 January 2010 by Icon Entertainment International.

Mary and Max was also released on Blu-ray as a part of the Adam Elliot Collection in 2025 by Madman Entertainment.

== Related exhibition ==
An exhibit of artifacts and clips from the film was presented in France and Australia. In France, the exhibition was hosted by Gaumont as part of the release. In Australia initially at the Australian Centre for the Moving Image for three months starting in March 2010 and then touring around Australia throughout 2010 and 2011.

== See also ==
- Harvie Krumpet and Memoir of a Snail, other claymation films directed by Adam Elliot
- List of Australian films
