= Karin Dayas =

American pianist and music educator

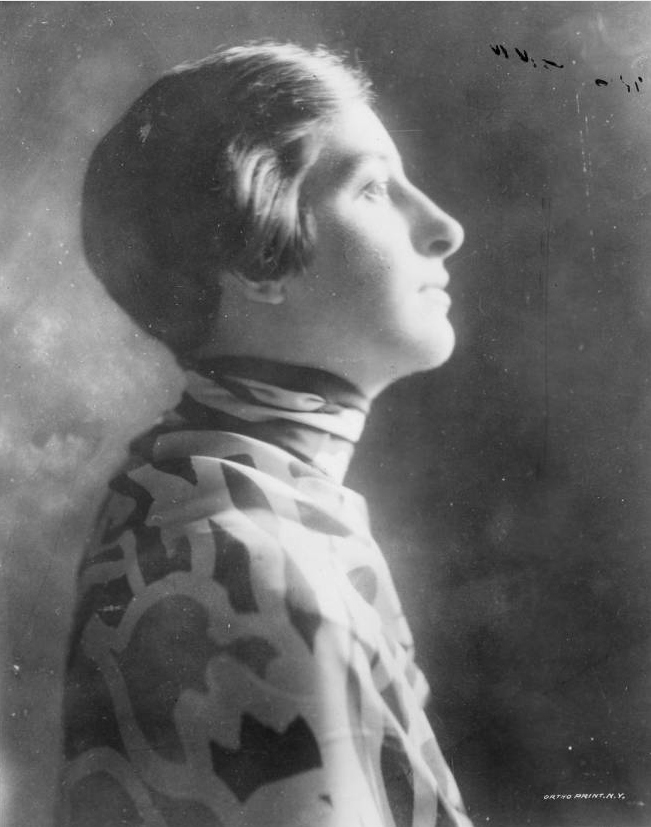
Karin Dayas in 1929.

Karin Elin Nadja Dayas (13 May 1892, Helsinki, Grand Duchy of Finland — 4 March 1971, Hamilton, Ohio) was an American pianist and music educator. She was a daughter of William Dayas and Margarethe Dayas, born Margaret Vocke, both pupils of Franz Liszt.

== Biography ==
Karin Dayas studied at the Grossherzogliche Musikschule in Weimar and was sponsored by the Grand Duke. She won the Liszt prize at the age of 14 and continued her studies at the Conservatory of Cologne. In 1932, she gave the American première of Ferruccio Busoni’s Piano Concerto with the Cincinnati Symphony Orchestra conducted by Fritz Reiner.

Dayas made a long career at the Cincinnati Conservatory of Music where she taught from 1926 for 45 years. Her pupils include Ward Swingle and Babette Effron.

Karin Dayas was married to the German-born violinist August Söndlin (1883–1966).

== Sources ==
- Biography of Karin Dayas.
