= Andrew McKaige =

Australian actor

- Born: 1959 (age 66–67); Melbourne, Australia
- Occupations: Actor, voice actor, singer-songwriter
- Spouse: Leslie McKaige (divorced)

Andrew McKaige (born 1959) is an Australian actor, most prominent in television soap opera. As well as acting, McKaige is also a voice-artist and singer-songwriter, having played with the country rock band, The Fine Line. In 1994, he won second place for Best Song in the Country Category of the Australian Songwriter's Association.

Divorced, McKaige met his ex-wife Leslie while living in Los Angeles. After seven years of marriage, the couple divorced when McKaige returned to Australia for a role in the Nine Network television soap series Paradise Beach.

== Early life ==
Coming from a family of avid Australian Rules Football fans, In his teens, McKaige, along with his brothers played for Melbourne Football Club, and was named Under 17's Best and Fairest in 1975. His father, Ken McKaige, played for a number of different clubs over his career. At the age of five years, his brother Cameron was the youngest person ever signed to a league club. This was to ensure that he was not later residentially tied to play for Richmond.

== Roles ==
While best known for his roles in Australian night-time soap operas, McKaige began his television career playing in comedy skits on the Paul Hogan Show. He then went on to play small roles on programs that included Cop Shop and The Sullivans. His big break came when he landed a recurring role in Skyways.

In addition to being an original cast member of the 1980s soap opera Sons and Daughters, he went on to be the second actor to play the role of Marty Jackson in Prisoner – succeeding Ronald Korosy and preceding Michael Winchester.

After residing in Los Angeles for a number of years, he returned to Australia and has since appeared in Paradise Beach, Blue Heelers, Neighbours, All Saints and The Secret Life of Us. He provides the voice of Pvt. Chips Dubbo in the Halo videogame series.

== Filmography ==
=== Film ===
Year	Title	Role	Notes
1984	Every Move She Makes	Solicitor	Television film
1987	The Facts of Life Down Under	Ren Calley	Television film
1996	Acri	Dr. Klaus	
1997	Heart of Fire	Grandy Robinson	Television film
2004	The Standard v.15	Coach	Short film
2013	Ties That Bind	Smith	Short film
2014	Before	Kevin Tasso	

=== Television ===
Year	Title	Role	Notes
1976	The Sullivans	Eddie Patterson (Kitty's love interest)	TV series
1977–78, 1982–84	Cop Shop	Gary Foster, Sean, Neil Peterson	TV series, 9 episodes
1979–80	Skyways	Alan McFarlane	TV series, 91 episodes
1982	Sons and Daughters	Bill Todd	TV series, 17 episodes
1983	Prisoner	Marty Jackson	TV series, 10 episodes
1984	Infinity Limited	Band 'In Disguise', Greg	TV series, 2 episodes
1991	Zorro	D'Artagnan	TV series, 2 episodes
1993-94	Paradise Beach	Nick Barsby	TV series
1995	Fire	Det. Henri Aldridge	TV series, 9 episodes
1996	Blue Heelers	Computer (voice), Gordy	TV series, 2 episodes
1996	The Man from Snowy River	Harry Finch	TV series, 2 episodes
1998	Neighbours	Geoff Burke	TV series, 19 episodes
1998–99	All Saints	Peter Morrison	TV series, 52 episodes
2000	Halifax f.p.	Tim McNamara	TV series, 1 episode
2001	The Secret Life of Us	Sean	TV series, 2 episodes

=== Video games ===
Year	Title	Role	Notes
2001	Halo: Combat Evolved	Private First Class Chips Dubbo	
2004	Halo 2	Private First Class Chips Dubbo	
2007	Halo 3	Private First Class Chips Dubbo	
2009	Halo 3: ODST	Private First Class Chips Dubbo	
