= John Flaus =

Australian actor

John Flaus is an Australian actor.

== Career ==
Flaus began acting in 1969 when he was on the set of the short film The American Poet's Visit, directed by Michael Thornhill. Flaus was there to observe the set, but Thornhill had told him to be on screen for a party scene.

== Filmography ==
- Rake (2014)
- Tracks (2013)
- Jack Irish (2012–2021) - 3 films and 15 episodes as Wilbur
- Metro Sexual (2019)
- Pinion (2010)
- I Love You Too (2010)
- Mary and Max (2009)
- Harvie Krumpet (2003)
- Crackerjack (2002)
- The Dish (2001)
- The Castle (1997)
- Lilian's Story (1996)
- The Nun and the Bandit (1992)
- Bloodlust (1992)
- See Jack Run (1992)
- Spotswood (1992)
- In Too Deep (1990)
- Jigsaw (1990)
- Nirvana Street Murder (1990)
- Warm Nights on a Slow Moving Train (1989)
- Grievous Bodily Harm (1988)
- Devil's Hill (telefilm) (1988)
- Ghosts of the Civil Dead (1988)
- Hungry Heart (1987)
- Feathers (1987)
- Traps (1986)
- My Country (1986)
- Bootleg (1985)
- Strikebound (1984)
- The Plains of Heaven (1982)
- Wronsky (1980)
- Blood Money (1980)
- Palm Beach (1979)
- Newsfront (1978)
- The Love Letters from Teralba Road (1977)
- Queensland (1976)
- Yackety Yack (1974)
- The American Poet's Visit (1969)

== See also ==
- Anarchism in Australia
- Sydney Push
