= William Dayas =

American composer

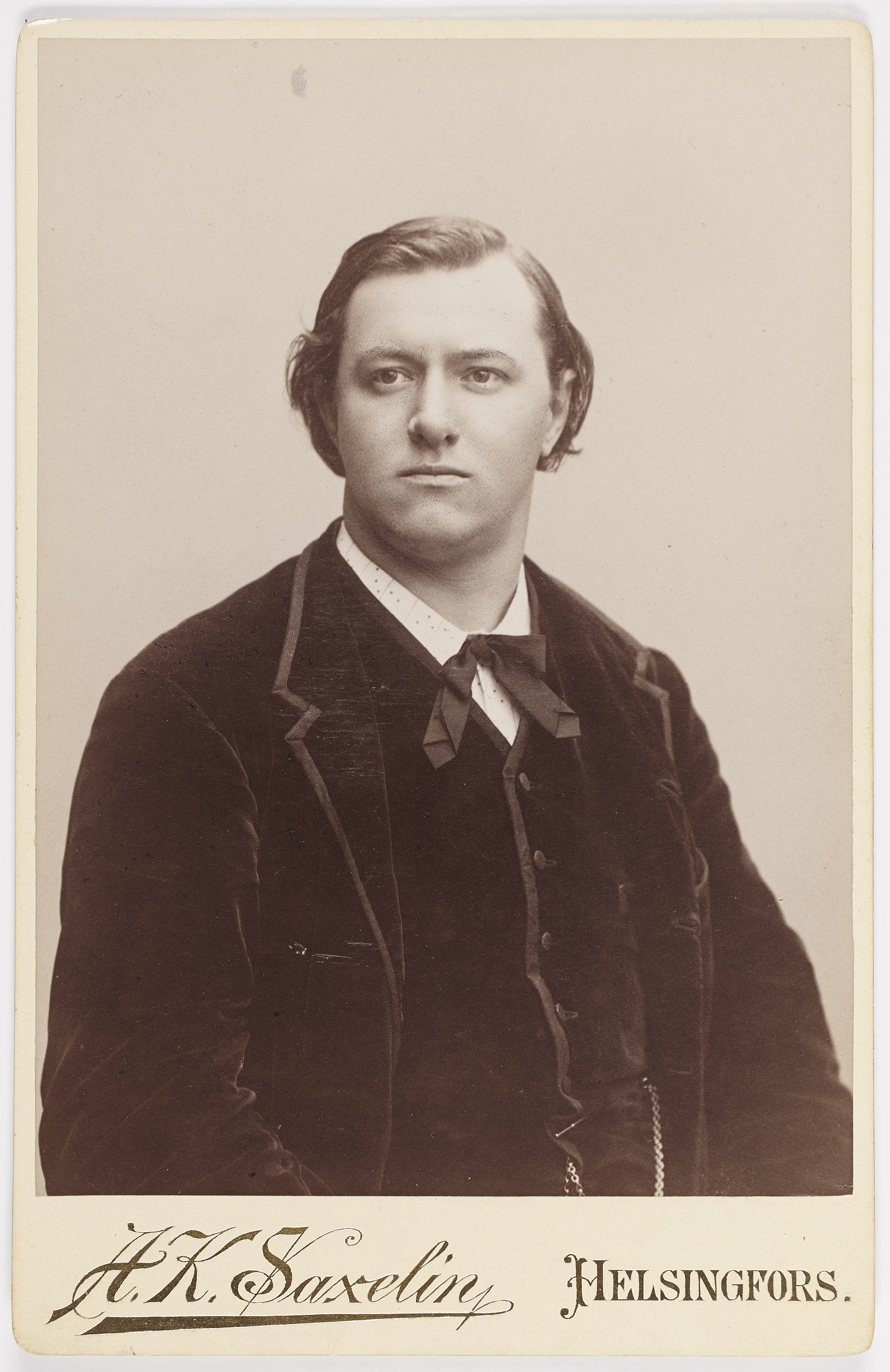
William Dayas during his phase in Helsinki, 1893.

William Humphreys Dayas (12 September 1863, New York – 3 May 1903, Manchester) was an American pianist, pedagogue and composer, one of the last pupils of Franz Liszt.

Dayas parents died when he was young. He took church organist appointments and piano pupils as a teen to earn a living, while also studying piano with S. B. Mills and Rafael Joseffy and organ with Samuel P. Warren. In 1881 he moved to Berlin to pursue musical education, studying with Franz Kullak, Ehrlich, and Haupt. He then travelled to Weimar, where he was among many in Liszt's circle in the 1880s.

From 1890 to 1893 he succeeded Busoni as professor of piano at the Helsinki conservatory. He subsequently taught in Wiesbaden and, at Franz Wüllner's invitation, to the Cologne Conservatorium (where he was succeeded by Rudolph Niemann). From 1896 until his death he taught at Royal Manchester College of Music, succeeding Charles Hallé, and succeeded by Arthur Friedheim.

Dayas concertized frequently, including with Adolph Brodsky, Wilma Neruda, and piano four-hands with Busoni. Upon his death, The Musical Times published remembrances by Busoni and Wilma Neruda, remarking on his fierce individuality and his pedagogical gifts. Busoni's arrangement of Bach's prelude and fugue for organ BWV 552 is dedicated to Dayas. The Royal Northern College of Music awards a Dayas Prize for Composition.

== Personal life ==
William Dayas was married to Margaret (Margarethe) Vocke, a fellow pupil of Liszt, in 1891. Their daughter Karin Dayas, a noted pianist and pedagogue, was born in Helsinki in 1892.

== Selected compositions ==
- two early organ sonatas, written in America
- a string quartet, premiered by the Halir Quartet in Wiesbaden
- sonata for violin and piano
- sonata for cello and piano, dedicated to Carl Fuchs
- waltzes for piano four-hands
- a suite for strings
- some songs
- miscellaneous other minor works for piano and organ

== Sources ==
- Johnstone, Arthur (1 August 1903). "The Late Mr. W. H. Dayas" (PDF). The Musical Times: 530–532.
- Otavan Iso Musiikkitietosanakirja (in Finnish). Vol. 2. Helsinki: Otava. 1977. p. 26. ISBN 951-1-04191-6.
