= John Ruane (director) =

Australian film director (born 1952)

John Ruane (born 1952) is an Australian film director best known for Death in Brunswick.

His first movie Queensland was made in 1975 when Ruane was a film school student. Ruane's next film was the telemovie Hanging Together followed by Feathers his second feature.

== Select Credits ==
- Queensland (1976) - writer director
- Blood Money (1980) - writer
- Coming of Age (1984) - cinematographer
- Hanging Together (1985) (TV movie)
- Feathers (1987) - writer, director
- Tender Hooks (1988) - script editor
- Death in Brunswick (1991) - writer, director
- Acropolis Now (1992) - writer
- Under the Skin (1994) - TV series - writer
- That Eye, the Sky (1994) - writer, director
- Dead Letter Office (1998) - director
- The Love of Lionel's Life (2000) (TV movie) - director
- Muggers (2000) - script editor
