= Aladdin (play) =

1805 play by Adam Oehlenschläger

Aladdin, or the Wonderful Lamp is a play by Adam Oehlenschläger. The play was published in Poetiske Skrifter, bind 2 from 1805.

The play is based upon the story of Aladdin in One Thousand and One Nights.

Aladdin, or the Wonderful Lamp is part of the Danish Culture Canon, maintained by the Danish Ministry of Culture.
