= Leila Hayes =

Australian actress (1940–2025)

- Born: Leila Marion Hayes; 12 January 1940; Dimboola, Victoria, Australia
- Died: 19 January 2025 (aged 85); Frenchs Forest, New South Wales, Australia
- Occupations: Actress; actors agent; radio presenter; singer; drama teacher; playwright; theatre producer; author
- Years active: 1971–1992, 2005 (as actress, post acting career became drama teacher and writer)
- Known for: Sons and Daughters (TV series) as Beryl Palmer
- Children: Melissa Hayes

Leila Marion Hayes (12 January 1940 – 19 January 2025) was an Australian actress and radio presenter, who later established a career as a drama teacher and talent agent, playwright, theatre producer and author.

Hayes early career prior to acting, was as a singer, in which she often appeared on television and variety shows.

She primarily in her early acting career featured in minor guest roles in television soap operas and miniseries, prior to her regular role in which she became internationally renowned in the 1980s soap opera Sons and Daughters as matriarch Beryl Palmer (later Hamilton) appearing throughout its entire run, in 950 episodes.

== Life and career ==
Hayes was born in Dimboola, Victoria, Australia on 12 January 1940.

She began her career as a singer in rural Victoria and often appeared on variety shows and national telethons

Her acting career started in the early 1970s where she became a staple in Crawford Productions drama series in guest roles including Homicide, Division 4, Matlock Police, Bluey, Cop Shop, and The Sullivans.

Hayes also acted in television miniseries, including Power Without Glory (1976), and some TV movies.

In 1981 she appeared in several episodes of cult series Prisoner as brothel madam Jeannie Baxter and was in an early episode of A Country Practice. The same episode coincidently starred Peter Phelps who played her stepson John in Sons and Daughters only a few months later.

The role in Sons and Daughters, made her internationally renowned, as the series was popular in several countries including the United Kingdom, and she toured Belgium with her daughter in 1988, she appeared in 950 episodes as Beryl Palmer, primarily alongside Tom Richards who played her husband David, Peter Phelps and Stephen Comey, who played her son Kevin, her character was noted for her numerous clashes with Rowena Wallace who played the iconic Patricia "Pat the Rat' Hamilton and in later episodes she marries Patricia's former husband Gordon Hamilton (Brian Blain).

Hayes also acted on stage, taking the leading role of April Delaney in comedy Dimboola and worked in talkback radio.

She retired from acting in 1992 (except for a short film in 2005) and lived a private life and rarely attended reunions or conventions. She ran her own actors school called Leila Hayes Drama Studio.

Although she left acting, she enjoyed life out of the limelight, but continued to write and published a children's book

Hayes died after a long period of ill health in Frenchs Forest, New South Wales, on 19 January 2025, aged 85.

== Filmography ==
=== Film ===
Year	Title	Role	Type
1977	Blue Fire Lady	Old Lady	Feature film
2005	Chasing Down the Dawn	Margot	Film short

=== Television ===
Year	Title	Role	Type
1971–76	Homicide	Mrs. Sullivan / Norma Franks / Policewoman Quinn / Joan Hansen / Gloria Mason / Libby Marshall	TV series, 6 episodes
1971–74	Division 4	Marge Reilly / Mrs. Darcy / Mrs. Arnot / Martha Moore / Pat Green / Dorrie / Mrs. Wright / Miss Hobbs / Smithy’s Mother / Jean / Alison Scott	TV series, 11 episodes
1971–74	Matlock Police	Natalie / Jean Stewart / Norma Richards	TV series, 3 episodes
1971–73	Penthouse Club	Herself - Singer	TV series, 3 episodes
1975	Cash and Company	Lola	TV series, Season 1, 1 episode
1976	The Professional Touch		Teleplay
1976	Bellbird		TV series, 1 episode
1976	Power Without Glory	Florrie Robinson	TV miniseries, Season 1, 6 episodes
1976; 1977	Bluey	Georgie	TV series, Season 1, 2 episodes
1978–79	Cop Shop	Mrs. Ward / Mrs. Selby / Marjorie Brown / Joan	TV series, 4 episodes
1978	The Truckies		TV series, Season 1, 1 episode
1978	The Sullivans	Anne Watson	TV series, 4 episodes
1979	Twenty Good Years	Joyce Fielding	TV series, Season 1, 1 episode
1981	Prisoner	Jeannie Baxter	TV series, Season 3, 4 episodes
1981	I Can Jump Puddles	Miss. Bryce	TV Miniseries; 1 episode
1981	A Country Practice	Sue Bushell	TV series, 2 episodes
1982–87	Sons and Daughters	Beryl Palmer / Beryl Hamilton / Ruby Hawkins	TV series, Seasons 1–6; 966 episodes
1982	MPSIB	Judith Levine	TV series, Season 1; 1 episode
1984	Miss N.S.W 1984	Guest - Herself	TV special
1986	Punchlines	Herself	TV special
1989	60 Minutes	Herself (with Abigail)	TV series, 1 episode
1990–1991	A Country Practice Mrs. Burns	TV series, Seasons 10–11; 3 episodes	
1992	Boys from the Bush	Daphne	TV series, Season 2, 1 episode
1994	Good Morning Australia	Guest	TV series, 1 episode
