= Richmond Hill (TV series) =

1988 Australian television soap opera

- Genre: Soap opera Drama
- Created by: Reg Watson
- Country of origin: Australia
- Original language: English
- No. of seasons: 1
- No. of episodes: 92

Production
- Production company: Reg Grundy Organisation

Original release
- Network: Network Ten
- Release: 27 January – 15 December 1988

Richmond Hill is an Australian prime time television soap opera broadcast by Network Ten made in 1988 by the Reg Grundy Organisation. It was devised by Reg Watson who also created Neighbours. It debuted on 27 January 1988 in a two-hour episode on Network 10 at 7.30pm. The series was only moderately successful and was cancelled on 22 June 1988. A total of 92 episodes were produced. As of March 2021, there has been no DVD Release of Richmond Hill.

== Synopsis ==
Whereas the TV soap Neighbours was set in suburban Melbourne, this series was set in a small fictional Australian country town near Sydney and most of the scenes revolved around the local police station, a real estate agency, and local pub. The serial therefore drew comparisons to the Seven Network series, A Country Practice and Cop Shop. The programme was produced in Sydney, some location shooting took place in Mona Vale, New South Wales. Connie Ryan's house in the series was in Berryman Street, North Ryde NSW.

The cast was made up of experienced TV soap actors in a bid to secure immediate success. Veteran actress Gwen Plumb. , famous for her long running role as gossip Ada Simmonds in The Young Doctors starred as Mum Foote.

Well-known names also included Paula Duncan, as well as Prisoner stars Maggie Kirkpatrick, Amanda Muggleton, and Tim Elston.

There were also several actors from the TV series Sons and Daughters, including Tom Richards, Rona Coleman, Angela Kennedy and Michael Long.

These actors where mixed as well with an assortment of young beginners, including Ashley Paske, Emily Symons (pre Home and Away), Marc Gray, and Melissa Tkautz, all made their TV debuts in the series. Whilst former comedy star Ross Higgins of Kingswood Country played the central role of the local police officer and family man Dan Costello.

== Production ==
In August 1987, David Brown of TV Week reported that the Grundy Organisation were producing new prime-time drama series Richmond Hill, which was commissioned by Network Ten. The series was scheduled to begin airing in early 1988 in a 7:30 pm timeslot, twice a week. A spokesperson for the network said Richmond Hill would centre on the residents of an outer-city area and their police station, however, it would not be a police drama. They stated "The stories that unfold will delve into the ives of the people of Richmond Hill. There are schoolteachers, market gardeners, the old and the young. There is a woman who has been 'mum' to wayward kids, a sexy young woman who is not wanted in the community and a police sergeant who has to deal with the lot of them." The series was produced by Phil East, who previously worked on Neighbours, and filming was due to start in October at Network Ten's Studio B in Sydney.

== Broadcast ==
Richmond Hill was broadcast on Network Ten in an evening timeslot 19:30–20:30 as two one-hour episodes each week on Wednesdays and Thursdays.

The series, although quite popular, was considered a lukewarm success in the Australian ratings, and was cancelled after six months in June 1988, and ended abruptly at episode 92 later that year. The decision came as a shock to producers, not least due to the fact that key actors contracts had just been extended for another year. As a result, the actors continued to be paid even though the series was no longer in production. There was not a definitive conclusion to the series because production was expected to continue. A final blow was the series had just been sold to the ITV network in the UK the very week it was axed in Australia, but ITV still aired all the episodes.

During early 1989, Channel Ten replayed Richmond Hill at 3.00pm weekday afternoons though after only 35 episodes that were replayed it was then abruptly removed from its programming schedule in replacement of US chat shows like The Phil Donahue Show and The Oprah Winfrey Show. The remaining episodes have still not been seen on Ten since their original 1988 broadcast.

Foxtel's UKTV Gold channel in Australia replayed the entire Richmond Hill series during the late 1990s between 1996 and 1997 during weekday mornings at 9.00am. The series has not been seen in the last 20 years on Australian TV and is waiting to be seen again whether it be released through DVD consumption or by a streaming channel.

=== International ===
The UK's ITV bought Richmond Hill in June 1988, and it was announced by the network in August that encouraged by the huge success of its sister-series Neighbours on the BBC, they had paid £600,000 for the rights to screen the series. Thames Television, the ITV region serving the London area, managed the series for the network, and regions opted in to a dedicated feed from Thames. ITV decided to show Richmond Hill as hour long episodes on Wednesday and Thursdays, directly opposite Neighbours as part of a revamp of the daytime schedule. It began airing on 5 October 1988. The intention was for all ITV regions to air the same episode, on the same day, at the same time, which would have been a first for an Australian soap opera on ITV, but had been tried once before with the American daytime soap opera Santa Barbara in 1987. Many of the ITV regions temporarily dropped another Australian series, A Country Practice, from their schedule to make way for the two weekly episodes of Richmond Hill and it isn't known whether it was ever intended to be a networked primetime series on ITV, although in April 1988, the ITV network cancelled Crossroads, leaving 3 half-hour evening slots. This would have meant the re-formatting of episodes, but Network Ten's cancellation of Richmond Hill seemingly resulted in ITV losing interest in the series completely, and its mid-afternoon timeslot meant that it didn't achieve anywhere near the audience figures that Neighbours, was achieving in its tea-time slot over on BBC One.

Due to local programming commitments, Granada Television started the series two weeks later than the rest of the ITV network, and started to screen the series weekly from 20 October 1988, and chose to screen A Country Practice in the Thursday slot instead. In 1990 the series was moved to a Sunday and didn't finish until spring 1991.

Central Television also broke away from the network screenings in 1989, eventually falling behind the rest of the network by dropping to one episode a week towards the end of its run (running Quincy in the Thursday slot instead). The majority of ITV regions resumed A Country Practice as its replacement, with regional UK viewers now considerably behind Australia and at varying parts of the storyline.

Richmond Hill was last screened in the UK in the mid-1990s on cable & satellite channel Wire TV (hosted by Femi Oke and co hosted Chris Stacey with guest presenters Darren Edwards, and Darren Gray), it was screened back to back with USA soap The Bold and the Beautiful, before Wire TV was finally axed in 1994.

In New Zealand, Richmond Hill was bought by TVNZ and premiered on Network Two at 8.20pm on Sunday 19 February 1989, after the series had been cancelled in Australia. Following the feature-length pilot, the series was aired as one episode a week (as opposed to two episodes a week in Australia) and shown Wednesday nights at 8.00pm (from 22 February) before moving to 7.30pm (from 5 April until 2 August) and then to Tuesday nights at 7.30pm (from 8 August until 24 October). After a short break, the series was moved to Friday nights at 7.30pm (from 8 December 1989 until 7 December 1990). All episodes were played.

Grundy also sold the soap to German television channel Pro 7, and Richmond Hill was dubbed into German. It was aired twice a week from 1991 to 1992.

== Major cast ==
- Warren Bryant – Tim Elston
- Janet Bryant – Paula Duncan
- Marty Bryant – Ashley Paske
- Dan Costello – Ross Higgins
- Anne Costello – Emily Symons
- Mum Foote – Gwen Plumb
- Ivy Hackett – Maggie Kirkpatrick
- Connie Ryan – Amanda Muggleton
- Andrew Ryan – Marc Gray
- Tim Shannon – Robert Sampson
- Susan Miller – Felicity Soper
- Jill Warner – Dina Panozzo
- Gary Turner – Dane Carson
- Mark Johnson – Warren Blondell
- Nikki Spencer – Danielle Carter
- Vince Comino – Manny Katts
- Mavis Roberts – Betty Lucas
- Frank Hackett – Robert Alexander
- Roger Lawson – Peter Kowitz
- Alice Costello – Rona Coleman
- Craig Connors – Michael Long
- Lawrie Benson – Tom Richards
- Evelyn Thomas – Janet Kingsbury
- Beatrice White – Moya O'Sullivan
- Mrs Jennings – Thelma Scott
- Jeff Wilson – Tim McCunn
- Fiona Matthews – Angela Kennedy
- Ben Brown – Dennis Grosvenor
