= Sally Boyden (singer) =

Australian actor and musician

- Born: Sally Ann Boyden; 21 May 1965 (age 61); Melbourne, Victoria, Australia
- Occupations: Singer; songwriter; children’s television writer; actress

Sally Ann Boyden (born 21 May 1965) is an Australian singer, songwriter, children’s television program writer and actress. Boyden commenced her performance career, at the age of seven, on TV series, Young Talent Time, in 1973. After leaving in 1976, she released her debut solo album, The Littlest Australian (early 1976), and appeared on United States TV's The Waltons (season 6, a 2 part episode: The Children's Carol, in 1977) to begin her international acting career.

== Biography ==
=== Early years to Young Talent Time ===
Sally Boyden was born on 21 May 1965 to Bradley, a car dealership owner, and Carmen Boyden. Boyden grew up in Essendon with three siblings. She attended Lowther Hall Anglican Grammar School for primary education, and Melbourne Girls Grammar for secondary education.

Boyden began her television career as a performer on Young Talent Time (YTT) in 1973, at the age of seven. In June 1976 Bradley described how "Television has never interfered with Sally's schooling and it never will. Even if she decides to make a career out of show business, we want her to have a full education."

While most YTT members waited until reaching age 16 to leave the show, Boyden left in 1976, aged ten, to concentrate on her solo career. While still a YTT member she had appeared on The Don Lane Show on rival TV network, Nine, after which fellow cast members made critical comments about that appearance. The Australian Women's Weekly's Wendy Cross described Boyden as "Performing both live and on television, she will broaden her horizons as Australia's youngest star. She is a 10-year-old prodigy; a whimsical mixture of seasoned sophisticate and freckle-faced kid-next-door."

=== The Littlest Australian to Dead Man's Float ===
After leaving YTT, Boyden issued her debut album, The Littlest Australian, early in 1976, on Hammard Records, which was certified as a gold record by mid-year. She was the youngest Australian ever to receive a gold record. Cross felt it "boasts tracks ranging from such rock 'n' roll favourites as 'Tan Shoes and Pink Shoelaces' to 'The Lord's Prayer'." In November of that year she commenced filming in the starring role of Linda in a TV film, Barnaby and Me (working title, Fuzzy, 1977), which was a co-production of the Australian Broadcasting Corporation (ABC-TV) and United States-based Transatlantic Enterprises. Bradley and Carmen had refused an offer for their daughter to tour with Liberace; Bradley explained "Faced with the choice of filming in Australia or going to the US. there was no question as to what we'd do. There are not many films made here with good parts for little girls, so it's a chance that doesn't come often."

The Boydens travelled to Los Angeles to promote Barnaby and Me in September 1977, where their daughter successfully auditioned for a guest role on The Waltons' double episode, "The Children's Carol", which was broadcast in December. She acted in other American-produced films and TV movies including Lassie: A New Beginning (September 1978) and The Little Dragons (filmed in 1978, broadcast in July 1980).

Boyden undertook her first theatre acting role as Wendy in a pantomime, Peter Pan, in January to February 1980 at the Comedy Theatre, Melbourne. She also starred in an Australian film, Dead Man's Float (1980) and TV series, The Sullivans (1981) and Come Midnight Monday (March 1982).

Hal Erickson of AllMovie described Dead Man's Float as a "very short and occasionally sweet juvenile melodrama. A cheeky bunch of children who think they're pretty smart are in for a rude awakening when they confront a gang of drug smugglers who play for keeps." During 1981 Boyden was associated with US actor, Christopher Atkins, which Ian Rolph of The Australian Women's Weekly described as "a warm friendship with that cool charmer from The Blue Lagoon, [Atkins], here to star in The Pirate Movie." In May 1983 she acted in an Australian stage version of Sound of Music at the Princess Theatre, Melbourne.

=== Later career ===
As an adult Sally Boyden relocated to London and worked as a songwriter for EMI, providing songs for Leo Sayer, David Cassidy and Shakin' Stevens.

She sang backing vocals for Duran Duran, featured with Major Matt Mason, and is part of a group, the Candy Bombers who performed at the Queens Jubilee in June 2002.

Back in Australia, Boyden toured the country with the Follow Your Dreams program as a motivational speaker talking to school children of her experiences in show business and life.

She returned to London where she held residencies at music venues: Twelve Bar Club, Ground Floor, Acoustic Café and South Bar, and performed in her band, The Candy Bombers.

Sally and the band have performed at the Edinburgh Festival, the Ibiza Millennium celebrations, and in Wales, New York and New Zealand.

Boyden headlined in Hyde Park as part of the Queen's Jubilee festivities.

She joined Duran Duran on stage at Wembley, Earls Court and in Boston and has recorded vocals for the group's albums: Pop Trash, Astronaut, Red Carpet Massacre, and All You Need Is Now. Her vocals can also be heard on The Dandy Warhols' album Welcome to the Monkey House, and the Stephen Duffy, Nick Rhodes project, The Devils. Sally moved to New York in early 2005 later on moving to Los Angeles.

Boyden created Punktuition, a children's entertainment, musical and educational based TV show, which was broadcast on PBS. Punktuition includes artwork by Dean Gorrisen, based in Australia, Chris Cerf in New York City, and graphics, writing and voices by Producer, George Cook in Hollywood.

Boyden has performed on the recent Young Talent Time reunion shows.

Along with producer, George Cook, she released two collections of her favourite self-penned tunes, Keepsake – Chapter 1 (2011) and Keepsake – Chapter 2 (2015) and is now signed to music publisher, Peer Music, in London. Punktuition is now in pre-production.

== Film ==
- The Homecoming: A Christmas Story (1971) (TV movie, US) Tess Wrayburn (uncredited)
- Magic Fibre (1975) (Film short) Student
- Barnaby and Me (1977) (ABC TV movie) Linda
- Lassie: The New Beginning (1978) (TV movie, US) Sam Stratton
- The Little Dragons (1979) (Feature film, US)
- Dead Man's Float a.k.a. 'Smuggler's Cove' (1980) (Feature film) Anne

== Television ==
- Young Talent Time (1973–1976) (TV series) Regular team member.
- Countdown (1975;1981) (ABC TV series) 1 episode. Sally sings "Shirley Got Married"
- The Don Lane Show (1975) (TV series) 1 episode. Herself as performer.
- "The Children's Carol" – The Waltons (December 1977) (TV series US) 2 episodes. Tess Wrayburn.
- The Mike Walsh Show (1978) (TV series). Interview and song performance from Sally herself.
- Young Talent Time 8th Birthday Special (1979) (TV special). Guest performer.
- Six Tonight (1979) (TV special). Guest as herself Sally.
- Restaurant (1979) (TV series) Regular role.
- Young Talent Time 10th Birthday Special (1981) (TV special) Sally sings "Blame It On The Boogie".
- The Sullivans (1981) (TV series) Guest role
- The Mike Walsh Show (1981) (TV series) Sally as Guest herself.
- Countdown (1981) (ABC TV series) 1 episode. Guest with Christopher Atkins ('The Pirate Movie')
- Come Midnight Monday (1982) (ABC TV series) 7 episodes. Regular role Beverley 'Biff' Hoolihan.
- Tonight Live With Steve Vizard (1992) (TV series) 1 episode. Herself as Guest.
- Young Talent Time Tells All (2001) (TV special) Herself as Performer.
- Young Talent Time: The Collection (2003) (DVD) Herself as Performer.
- A Current Affair (2011) (TV series - archive clips) 1 episode. Herself as performer.

== Discography ==
=== Studio albums ===
List of albums, with selected chart positions
Title	Album details	Peak chart positions	Certification
Title	Album details	AUS	Certification
The Littlest Australian	Released: June 1976; Format: LP, cassette; Label: Hammard (HAM 008)	25	AUS: Gold
A Day in a Life	Released: July 1977; Format: LP, cassette; Label: Hammard (HAM 018)	52	
Become	Released: 1998; Format: CD; Label: EMI	-	
Keepsake – Chapter 1	Released: 18 May 2011; Format: digital download; Label: Sally Boyden	-	
Keepsake – Chapter 2	Released: 17 August 2015; Format: digital download; Label: Sally Boyden	-	
