= Split (1989 film) =

Film by Chris Shaw

- Original VHS cover
- Directed by: Chris Shaw
- Written by: Chris Shaw
- Produced by: Barbara Horscraft
- Starring: Timothy Dwight; Joan Bechtel
- Cinematography: Chris Shaw
- Edited by: Chris Shaw
- Music by: Robert Galpren; Chris Shaw
- Release date: March 24, 1989
- Running time: 85 minutes
- Country: United States
- Language: English

Split is a 1989 film directed by Chris Shaw and starring Timothy Dwight and Joan Bechtel. The film was notable for its early use of CGI. It was the final film appearance of Gene Evans.

== Plot ==
A big brother-like leader from another dimension known as the Director controls our every move while letting us believe that we have free will. Starker is a homeless man for whom no records exist so he is able to elude the Director and his Agency. He attempts to counter the oppressive message and is forced to go into hiding with a round disc that he believes is the gateway to a greater humanity.

== Cast ==
- Timothy Dwight as Starker
- Joan Bechtel as The waitress
- John Flynn as The artist
- Chris Shaw as The Director

== Reception ==
Kevin Thomas of the Los Angeles Times called Split "a timeless political-religious parable".
