= Tom Richards (actor) =

Australian actor (born 1948)

- Born: Thomas Richards; 22 March 1948 (age 78); Brisbane, Queensland, Australia
- Other name: Thomas Richards
- Occupation: Actor
- Years active: 1971−1999, 2007-2016 (screen and stage)
- Known for: Sons and Daughters as David Palmer; Matlock Police as Steve York

Thomas Richards (born 22 March 1948) is an Australian former actor on television soap operas.

He is best known for roles including in Matlock Police as Steve York from 1973 and 1976 and in the 1980s soap opera Sons and Daughters as David Palmer from 1982 until 1987, opposite co-star Leila Hayes. He is an Australian former television actor best known for his roles in iconic Australian soap operas and dramas.

Throughout four decades as a performer Richards continued to become recognised through his portrayals of roles in police dramas, medical series and family soap operas. He started by making brief appearances in the Crawford TV Productions series Homicide and Division 4 and Ryan.

== Early life and education ==
Tom Richards was born on 22 March 1948, in Australia. His interest in performing arts emerged early but little information exists about his childhood which directed him toward a future in acting. Progress in Australian television during the time inspired Richards toward performing arts hence he decided to pursue acting professionally.

The Twelfth Night Theatre of Brisbane became his first dramatic education center following his highly regarded position as a venue for developing Australian actors (Twelfth Night Theatre, 2025). Under the guidance of the Twelfth Night theatre Richards learned basic acting skills through both observing staged plays and completing a classical theatre curriculum in 1971. He made his first performance a stage adaptation of The Rose and the Ring (1971) which proved instrumental in his skill development before his television debut (The Rose and the Ring, 2025).

His theater background during the early stage of his career developed fundamental artistic skills which enabled him to overcome television industry competition successfully. The well-regarded Twelfth Night Theatre became famous for developing performers and offered him essential training in developing stage presence, voice modulation skills and character development methods. The theatrical training he received at Twelfth Night Theatre enabled him to move smoothly from stage appearances toward meeting television requirements that needed precise performance with multiple takes and various roles.

The television industry in Melbourne flourished in the 1970s so Richards relocated there seeking career advancement. During the early years of his television career Richards appeared in crime series including Homicide, Division 4 and Ryan where he demonstrated his strength in powerful character portrayal. The theatrical experience from his past proved essential for Richards to get major television parts in police shows and soap operas. His strong acting foundation during the first half of his career created the basis for which he became renowned in Australian entertainment over more than four decades.

== Career ==
The Twelfth Night Theatre in Brisbane was Richards' initial training ground. He subsequently moved to Melbourne in the early 1970s, to further his career, securing supporting roles parts in three police procedural series across the 1970s, including Homicide, Division 4 and Ryan.

Recognition came in 1972 when he won the role of young, stubborn, slightly unorthodox Senior Detective Steve York in Australian police drama Matlock Police, The character was first introduced in episode 100, and he played him for four years. The role earned him further television roles in Cop Shop and The Box.

The television program Sons and Daughters granted Richards further success, in the main role of David Palmer in 1982. The career-defining role lasted for six seasons, through to 1987. The series became successful in Britain, expanding Richards' fame internationally.

After the series concluded, Richards appeared as regular character Lawrie Benson in short-lived soap opera Richmond Hill in 1988. The same year, he had a recurring role in long-running soap opera Home and Away, returning again in 1995, to portray a different character. He continued his television career with roles in The Young Doctors, A Country Practice, The Flying Doctors, Water Rats and All Saints.

Richards appeared in several features including American films Rapid Fire (1992) and Future War (1997).

In 2009, Richards played Harold 'Mitch' Mitchell in a Sydney Theatre Company stage production of A Streetcar Named Desire, alongside Cate Blanchett and Joel Edgerton. His performance was met with critical acclaim. The Sydney performance was followed by an international tour, including the Kennedy Center in Washington, D.C., and Brooklyn Academy of Music in New York City.

== Filmography ==
=== Film ===
Year	Title	Role/s	Notes
1977	Raw Deal	Desert Leader	
1979	Dawn!	Harry	Documentary biopic
1980	Mystery Island	John Campbell	
1981	Run, Rebecca, Run	Sargeant Jamieson	Film
1981	Breaking Loose: Summer City II	Rick	Film
1981	Spook	Jack Ferris	
1989	Rapid Fire	Agent #4	Film
1989	Afraid to Dance	Don Chapman	Direct-to-video film
1990	The Min-Min		
1990	Sher Mountain Killings Mystery	Alec Cordeux	
1996	Becoming Rebecca	Tony	
1997	Future War	Cameron	Direct-to-video film

=== Television ===
Year	Title	Role/s	Notes
1972–1973	Homicide	Constable Fraser / Constable Higgins	2 episodes
1972–1976	Matlock Police	Senior Detective Steve York / Constable / Snr Constable Terri Young / Constable Moore	133 episodes
1973	Division 4	Dave / Graeme Hudson	2 episodes
1973	Ryan	Steve / Hired Thug	2 episodes
1976–1977	Bluey	Porgy Beaumont / Kevin Reed	2 episodes
1977	The Sullivans	Lieutenant Braddock / Officer	8 episodes
1977	The Box	Greg Patterson	20 episodes
1977–1980	Cop Shop	Harry Lewis / Tom Perry / Derek Benson / Ted Fraser	7 episodes
1978	Case for the Defence	Ray	1 episode
1978	Cass		TV movie
1978	Plunge Into Darkness	Joe	TV movie
1978–1979	Chopper Squad	Derek Price	3 episodes
1979	Money in the Bank	Charlie	TV movie
1980	Spring & Fall	Detective	1 episode
1981	Menotti		2 episodes
1981	Holiday Island	Daven	3 episodes
1981	Bellamy	Burns	6 episodes
1981	Richmond Hill	Lawrie Benson	
1981–1992	A Country Practice	Hal Secombe / Ron Kelly / Brian Kelly	10 episodes
1982–1987	Sons and Daughters	David Palmer	Series regular, 855 episodes
1988–1995	Home and Away	Graham Lynch / Murdock 'Mud' Roberts	15 episodes
1990	Bony	Sargeant Frank Carter	TV movie
1990	The Flying Doctors	Colin Mooreland	1 episode
1992	The Adventures of Skippy	Mr Samson	1 episode
1993	Joh's Jury	Robert Butler	TV movie
1995	Police Rescue	Major Bellamy	1 episodes
1996	Pacific Drive	Erick Carlyle	
1996	Water Rats	Dan Manning	1 episode
1996	Those Who Hunt Elves	Soldier, Kolchat (voice)	Animated series
1999	Big Sky	Ted	1 episode
	Murder Call	Fred Greaves	1 episode
2007	All Saints	Dave Curtis	1 episode
2010	I Rock	The Wonton Boys	1 episode

== Personal life ==
Richards has kept much of his personal life private, preferring to let his professional achievements define his public image.
