= Michael Long (actor) =

Australian actor

- Born: Michael Merrick Long; 11 October 1947; Sydney
- Died: 17 April 1991 (aged 43); Sydney
- Occupation: Actor
- Spouse: Carolyn

Michael Merrick Long (11 October 1947 – 17 April 1991) was an Australian actor on stage, television and movies, as well as a voice artist.

== Career ==
Long appeared in early television roles in Matlock Police, Homicide, Division 4 and Bluey. Further television credits included Cop Shop, Prisoner (as Mick O'Brien), Taurus Rising (as Sam Farrer), Sons and Daughters (as Stephen Morrell) and Richmond Hill (as Craig Connors).

He appeared in several films including sci-fi thriller The Chain Reaction (1980), gangster drama Squizzy Taylor (1982), the multi-award winning Careful, He Might Hear You (1983) and thriller Dead Calm (1989), the latter alongside Nicole Kidman, Sam Neill and Billy Zane.

Long starred in numerous stage productions throughout his career, including King Lear (1967), A Midsummer Night’s Dream (1968), Measure for Measure (1972) and Hedda Gabler (1988), and the 1971 J. C. Williamson's / Harry M. Miller Australian stage production of Conduct Unbecoming playing Subaltern Millington. He also worked as a stage manager and lighting designer.

He voiced a character in 1973 animated TV movie The Gentlemen of Titipu. He also provided voiceover in television and radio commercials, documentaries and corporate videos, initially working for the ABC. This became his main work, continuing through his illness until a few weeks before his death.

== Death ==
Long died of lung cancer in 1991 at the age of 43.

== Filmography ==
=== Television ===
Title	Year	Role	Type
1968–1974	Homicide	Various characters	8 episodes
1970	The Long Arm	Nick	Episode 18: "Only a Wave Away"
1971–1973	Matlock Police	Various characters	4 episodes
1971–1973	Division 4	Various characters	4 episodes
1972	Boney	Martin Miller	Episode 2: "Boney and the White Savage"
1972; 1975	Behind the Legend	Heir	Anthology series, 2 episodes
1973	Ryan	Squib	Episode 5: "King's Bishop to Queen Three"
1973	The Gentlemen of Titipu	Voice	Animated TV film
1974	This Love Affair		Anthology series, Episode 6: "Seven-tenths of a Second"
1974	The Violins of Saint-Jacques	Sothsane	TV movie
1976	Bluey	Sam Carruthers	Episode 3: "Final Dividend"
1977	Ballantyne's Mission	Father Chris Ballantyne	TV movie
1977–1979	Cop Shop		4 episodes
1978	Because He's My Friend	Matt	TV movie
1979	The Young Doctors	John Bridges	4 episodes
1981	Prisoner	Mick O'Brien	Season 3, 8 episodes
1981	Bellamy	Carver	Miniseries, episode 2: "The Carver Gang"
1982	Taurus Rising	Sam Farrer	TV series
1982-85	Sons and Daughters	Stephen Morrell / Mr Bailey	TV series, 251 episodes
1984	Special Squad	Scarface	Episode 34: "Suzie's War"
1987–1990	Rafferty's Rules	Kilminster	3 episodes
1988	Richmond Hill	Craig Connors	2 episodes
1988	Emma: Queen of the South Seas	Captain Stephens	Miniseries, 2 episodes
1989; 1990	Mission: Impossible	Sanchez / Captain	Season 2, 2 episodes

=== Film ===
Title	Year	Role	Type
1971	Demonstrator	Hugh Prentiss	
1980	The Chain Reaction	Doctor	
1982	Squizzy Taylor	Detective Piggott	
1983	The Winds of Jarrah	Paul Marlow	
1983	Now and Forever	William Horton	
1983	Careful, He Might Hear You	Mr Hood	
1989	Dead Calm	Specialist Doctor	
1989	Liberty & Bash	Cop #2	

== Stage ==
=== As actor ===
Title	Year	Role	Type
1966	Two Programs of Short Plays: Endgame	Clov	Jane Street Theatre, Sydney
1966	Two Programs of Short Plays: The Ballad of the Sad Café	Narrator	Jane Street Theatre, Sydney
1967	King Lear		Theatre 62, Adelaide
1967	Cabbages at the Cross Roads		Theatre 62, Adelaide
1968	A Midsummer Night's Dream		Theatre 62, Adelaide
1968	The Anniversary / Poor Bitos		Theatre 62, Adelaide
1968	Burke's Company		Adelaide Teachers College with STCSA
1968	Wait Until Dark	Croker	St Martin’s Theatre Company Melbourne
1969	Invitation to a March	Schuyler Grogan	St Martin’s Theatre Company Melbourne
1969	Love for Love	Valentine	St Martin’s Theatre Company Melbourne
1971	Conduct Unbecoming	Subaltern Millington	Theatre Royal Sydney, Comedy Theatre, Melbourne with J. C. Williamson's & Harry M. Miller
1972	Measure for Measure		Nimrod Street Theatre, Sydney
1972	Birds on the Wing		Macleay Theatre, Sydney with Freeman Fishburn Productions
1980	Hal: Aspects of Henry IV Pt.1	Hal / Henry Percy / Owen Glendower	Phillip Street Theatre, Sydney with Vanwill Productions
1980	Children	Randy	Bondi Pavilion, Sydney with Player's Theatre Company
1988	Hedda Gabler		Princess Theatre, Brisbane with TN! Theatre Company

=== As crew ===
Title	Year	Role	Type
1968	Green Julia	Stage Manager	Theatre 62, Adelaide
1968	Generation	Set Designer	Theatre 62, Adelaide
1970	Frank Lazarus and Maggie Soboil	Stage Director	Theatre 62, Adelaide
1983	Dancescape: Pineapple Poll	Set and/or Property Maker	QUT with BCAE Dance
1984	Hamlet on Ice	Stage Manager	Brookes Street, Brisbane with TN! Theatre Company
1984	Ultra Chic Cabaret	Stage Manager	Brookes Street, Brisbane with TN! Theatre Company
1988	The Lady Aoi	Lighting Designer	Princess Theatre, Brisbane with TN! Theatre Company
1988	Beach Blanket Tempest	Lighting Designer	Princess Theatre, Brisbane with TN! Theatre Company
1989	The Popular Mechanicals	Lighting Designer	Princess Theatre, Brisbane with TN! Theatre Company
1990	Brief Lives	Lighting Designer	Princess Theatre, Brisbane, Gold Coast Arts Centre & Queensland regional tour with TN! Theatre Company
1991	Dance 91	Venue Supervisor	Rockhampton Performing Arts Centre, Mackay Entertainment Centre, Princess Theatre, Brisbane with QUT
