= The Professional Touch =

Film

The Professional Touch is a 1976 Australian TV movie directed by Oscar Whitbread starring Fred "Cul" Cullen.

== Cast ==
- Fred "Cul" Cullen as Harry Blakely
- Allen Bickford
- Gary Down
- Leila Hayes
- Norman Hodges
- Mary Marshall
- Michael Preston as Big Ernie
- Tim Robertson
- Ken Wayne
