= Barnaby and Me =

1978 Australian made-for-TV film

- Written by: James Henerson
- Directed by: Norman Panama
- Starring: Sid Caesar; Juliet Mills; Hugh Keays-Byrne; Sally Boyden
- Country of origin: Australia
- Original language: English

Production
- Producer: Matthew Herman
- Running time: 90 mins
- Production company: Trans-Atlantic Enterprises

Original release
- Network: Australian Broadcasting Corporation
- Release: 1978

Barnaby and Me is a 1978 Australian made-for-television film. It features a girl and her talking koala, Barnaby, who are pursued by criminals.

The film was one of six TV movies made in Australia by Transatlantic Enterprises along with the ABC. Barnaby and Me was made in association with Six Flags, presented as the theme park company's first foray into the movie business.

It was the final film directed by Norman Panama.

== Cast ==
- Sid Caesar as Leo Fisk
- Juliet Mills as Jennifer, young widow
- Sally Boyden as Linda
- Hugh Keays-Byrne as Huggins
- Rangi Nicols as Ko
- John Newcombe as himself
- Michael Beecher as French Reporter
- Bruce Spence as Tall Baddie
- Ivar Kants as Boris
- Daws Butler as Barnaby
- John McTernan as Secretary

== Production ==
It was the second film from Transatlantic Enterprises, following No Room to Run. The film was announced in November 1976 as Billy. Another working title was Fuzzy.

Australian singer Sally Boyden turned down the chance to tour with Liberace to make the movie. John Newcombe has a cameo where he plays a game of tennis against Caesar.

Filming took place from mid November 1976 to mid January 1977.

Caesar was addicted to alcohol and pills at the time and later wrote in his memoirs that on the flight out "I took my usual ration of booze and pills and passed out completely. When the plane landed in New Zealand Caesar could not be woken up so they took him to hospital. His wife Florence was flown to Auckland but by the time she arrived Caesar had gone to Sydney. Norman Panama requested Florence stay on the set to ensure Caesar completed the film. Caesar wrote "she did and she got me to work every day, in reasonably usable condition." However Caesar said he could not remember anything about making the movie or any of the time he spent in Australia.

== Notes ==
- Caesar, Sid; Davidson, Bill (1982). Where have I been? : an autobiography. Crown Publishers.
