= Rona Coleman =

Australian actress

- Born: c.1946/1947 (aged between 78-80)
- Occupation: Actress
- Years active: 1965-1999
- Known for: Sons and Daughters

Rona Coleman (born c.1946/1947) is a former actress, best known for appearing in soap opera Sons and Daughters for a 210-episode run from 1984 to 1985. As Heather O'Brien, she was the wife of Mike O'Brien, played by Ken James, and mother to two children, Katie and Jeff (played by Jane Seaborn and Craig Morrison). The family were eventually written-out of the series after a year, although Heather would return for a guest stint after the rest of the O'Brien's all departed.

Coleman has also appeared in Homicide, Matlock Police, Richmond Hill, E Street (as Veronica Bromley), A Country Practice, Water Rats, Home and Away and All Saints and the TV film Without Warning.

She has also featured in numerous theatre roles from 1965 until 1982, including Shakespeare roles like Hamlet and A Midsummer Night's Dream. In 1970, she performed as Eliza Doolittle in a national tour of My Fair Lady.

== Filmography (selected) ==
Title	Year	Role
Homicide	1968	Guest role Brenda Muir
Contrabandits (TV series)	1968	Denise Payne
Matlock Police (TV series)	1971	Gay Lincoln
The Mike Walsh Show (TV series)	1978	Guest - Herself
Starstruck	1982	Backup Singer 3
Sons and Daughters (TV series)	1984-1985	Heather O'Brien (210 episodes)
Richmond Hill (TV series)	1988	Alice Costello
A Country Practice (TV series)	1988	Anita Novak
Home and Away (TV series)	1992/1997	Carol Watson/Celebrant
All Saints (TV series)	1999	Cheryl Williams
Water Rats	1999	Mrs. Firth
Without Warning (TV movie)	1999	Stella
