= Puzzle (1978 film) =

- VHS cover art
- Written by: Herbert J Wright
- Directed by: Gordon Hessler
- Starring: James Franciscus; Wendy Hughes; Robert Helpmann; Peter Gwynne; Gerard Kennedy
- Country of origin: Australia
- Original language: English

Production
- Producer: Herbert J Wright
- Running time: 75 minutes
- Production company: Transatlantic Enterprises

Original release
- Release: December 1978

Puzzle is a 1978 Australian television film directed by Gordon Hessler.

It was one of six telemovies made in Australia by Transatlantic Enterprises.

== Premise ==
A woman steals gold from her second husband just before his death. She goes looking for it with her first husband, a tennis pro.

== Cast ==
- James Franciscus as Harry Scott
- Wendy Hughes as Claudine Cunningham
- Robert Helpmann as Shepherd
- Sheila Kennelly as Mrs Foster
- Kerry McGuire as Diana Carson

== Reception ==
The Sydney Morning Herald called it "a shambles, confused in concept and sloppy in script direction."
