= Mark Conroy =

Australian actor (born 1957)

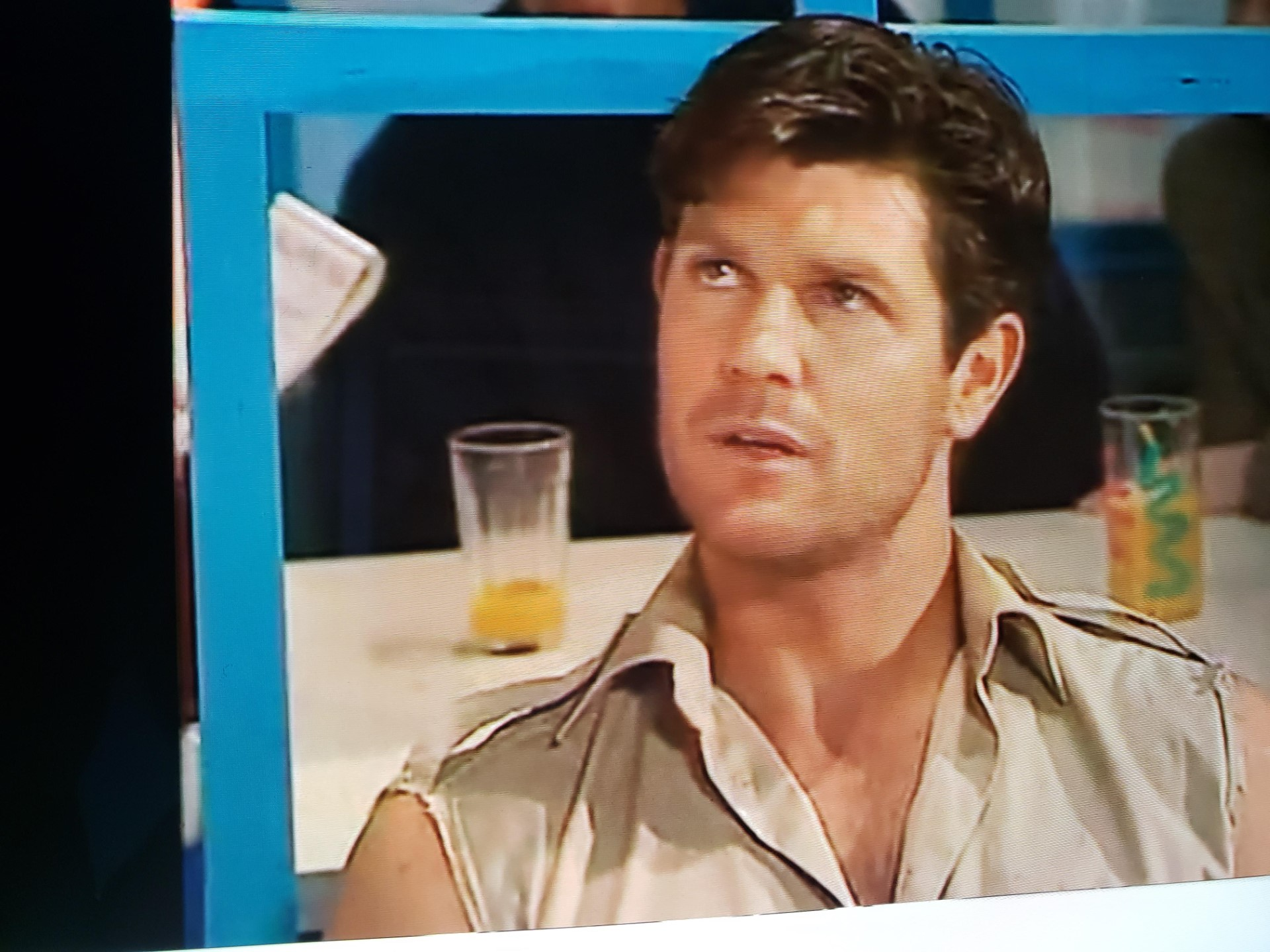
- Born: 1957 (age 67–68); Melbourne, Australia
- Occupation(s): Actor, science teacher
- Known for: Sons and Daughters, Home and Away

Mark Conroy (born 1957 in Melbourne) is an Australian actor. He is also known for his international modelling career.

He is perhaps best known for his role as Glen Young in the television soap opera Sons and Daughters in 1985–86. He then played crooked shark fisherman Zac Burgess in Home and Away.
