= Sons and Daughters (Australian TV series) =

Australian soap opera

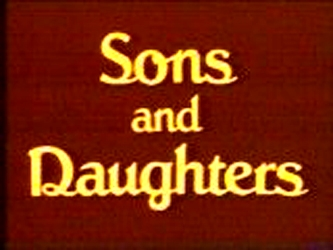
- Genre: Soap opera
- Created by: Reg Watson
- Written by: See links at end of article for comprehensive list
- Directed by: See links at end of article for comprehensive list
- Starring: (see main cast list and character family tree below)
- Country of origin: Australia
- Original language: English
- No. of seasons: 6
- No. of episodes: 972

Production
- Production locations: Sydney; Melbourne
- Running time: 25 minutes
- Production company: Reg Grundy Organisation

Original release
- Network: Seven Network
- Release: 18 January 1982 – 27 December 1987

Sons and Daughters is an Australian Logie Award-winning soap opera/drama serial, broadcast by the Seven Network between January 1982 and December 1987 and produced by the Reg Grundy Organisation. It was created by executive Reg Watson, and is distributed by Fremantle.

Sons and Daughters is remembered for its regular use of dramatic end-of-season cliffhangers and its most famous character; Patricia "Pat the Rat" Hamilton, initially played by Rowena Wallace, who became in 1983 the second soap opera actor, rather than personality, to win the Gold Logie award, the first being Pat McDonald in 1974, for her work on Number 96.

The story follows a Romeo and Juliet style romance of two twins separated at birth, who meet twenty years later who fall in love not realising they are siblings. The series was billed as an Australian version of Dallas and screened in seventy countries.

When Rowena Wallace decided to leave the series, in 1985 her popular character was recast, with Belinda Giblin taking over the role, in a story-arc which sees the character receiving extensive plastic surgery in Rio de Janeiro, and returning as the look-alike Alison Carr.

A notable cast member in the series later years was the Australian pop singer Normie Rowe. Rowe had previously appeared in musical theatre, but it was his first major TV drama role.

== Broadcast ==
The extended pilot episode premiered on Monday, 18 January 1982, during the Christmas/New Year non-ratings period in Sydney and Melbourne, and the following week in Brisbane and Adelaide. For the first two years in Sydney and Melbourne, it usually aired in four half-hour installments, Monday to Thursday, for approximately ten months of the year, although this differed in other markets. After 1984, it was mostly aired as two hour-long episodes. The series was cancelled in November 1986, and production ended in March 1987, with the final episode broadcast in Sydney on Sunday, 27 December 1987, and in Melbourne, on Sunday, 10 January 1988 (again in the non-ratings period). Adelaide station ADS7 was one of the first to complete the series, showing the final episodes in a two-hour special on Monday, 16 November 1987.

Sons and Daughters was successful internationally. From February 1983, British television broadcaster ITV began airing un-networked episodes of the series to audiences across the United Kingdom, meaning that some parts of the country were months or even years behind others in the storyline. During the late 1980s, the series aired throughout western Europe on various TV stations. The UK and most European and foreign territories broadcast the series in daytime, although it did air at 7 pm in the Netherlands and Belgium.

== History and synopsis ==
Sons and Daughters was broadcast nationally on the Seven Network and produced by the Reg Grundy Organisation. It was created in 1981 by television executive Reg Watson, well known for his work on British soap opera, Crossroads (1964), and for creating the popular Australian serials, The Young Doctors (1976), The Restless Years (1977), and Prisoner (1979).

Watson was inspired by the glossy US prime-time soap opera Dallas and its spin-off Knots Landing, which were averaging huge ratings in the US. Curious to see how an Australian soap opera, similar in style to those shows, would fare with early evening or prime-time audiences, he began coming up with new material for possible ongoing serials. Two of his ideas were commissioned for broadcast in 1982. Taurus Rising, which was bought by Nine Network, was a series about two wealthy families at war, the Drysdales and the Brents. The Seven Network green lit Sons and Daughters – also about two families: the wealthy Hamiltons, and working class Palmers – as their new soap, commissioning 174 episodes in the first year to air in half-hour installments. While Taurus Rising was not a success for Nine, Sons and Daughters was an instant hit on Seven and it quickly became the biggest and most watched series on Australian television. Its success can be somewhat attributed to the writers placing one or more families, and other peripheral characters, in either Sydney or Melbourne. They knew the show would appeal to viewers living in both those cities. Watson was keenly aware that Melbourne-based shows often did not rate well with Sydney viewers, and he set about using either Sydney or Melbourne as the birthplace for many of the show's cast of characters. Critics and press likened the serial as an Australian version of Latin American or South American telenovelas, which would often hit huge viewership figures in their home country.

Ratings for the serial were high for the first three years of production, but following the departure of the series' biggest star, Rowena Wallace in early 1985, to pursue other acting opportunities, ratings quickly began to decline. A series of replacement characters were brought in, most notably Abigail, as Caroline Morrell, and former 1960s pop idol Normie Rowe as her husband Doug. However, ratings were still not as strong as they had been in the early years, so producers decided to bring back Wallace's character, Patricia Hamilton – this time, portrayed by another actress. In mid-1985, Belinda Giblin arrived as 'Alison Carr', the new incarnation of Patricia. The storyline behind the character’s changed appearance was extensive plastic surgery undertaken in Rio de Janeiro, to escape from both the Australian police who had arrested her for the murder of Luke Carlyle, and Luke’s father Roger, a corrupt millionaire out to avenge his son’s death. Patricia used this new identity to regain entry into Australia to clear her name – but slowly, the other characters all began to realise that Alison was really Patricia in disguise.

With an instant boost to viewing figures, and Giblin's portrayal of Alison/Patricia a huge success, the serial was deemed to be saved from cancellation and continued through 1985 and into 1986, albeit on shaky ground. A drastic cast revamp followed in early 1986, with long-serving cast members removed in an attempt to appeal to younger viewers. More comedy was also added to scripts and storylines. Unfortunately, this did nothing to halt the falling ratings and so more desperate measures were applied to try and save the show. In late 1986, Rowena Wallace agreed to return to the series – this time as Patricia/Alison's long-lost twin sister, Pamela Hudson. Production ended in March 1987, with a one-hour episode aired weekly across Australia, until the end of the year.

Sons and Daughters is best remembered for its over-the-top storylines and dramatic cliffhangers, which became much more outrageous in the later seasons. One such 'cliffhanger episode', the finale for the 1986 season, Alison Carr (Belinda Giblin) is bitten by a venomous snake, which had been hidden in a wall safe that Alison broke into to steal documents belonging to long-running villain, Wayne Hamilton (Ian Rawlings). In the same episode, Wayne is pursued by a great white shark, and Andy Green (Danny Roberts) is kicked in the face by a rearing race horse. All these cliffhangers were used as a way to try and increase ratings, but ultimately, they had poor resolutions, which had further added to the demise of the serial. Sons and Daughters has gradually gained a cult following after several repeat runs locally and other international territories. Between 2020 and 2022, the entire series was released on DVD as season boxsets by ViaVision Entertainment.

== Theme tune ==
The theme tune was composed by partners Peter Pinne & Don Battye and performed by Mick Leyton and Kerrie Biddell. Two main versions of the theme were used in the closing credits, one in 3/4 time and one in 4/4 time: the first version was used as the main closing theme for most episodes shown in 1982 and 1983, with very occasional use of the second version, while the second version was then used permanently from 1984 to 1987. In addition. The full theme tune was released on a 7-inch single in the UK in 1984 and reached number 68 in the charts remaining for three weeks. It was released on the A1 record label with catalogue number 'A1 286'.

== Plot ==
=== Season 1 ===
The initial premise for the show was a Romeo and Juliet-style romance storyline that revolved around two families, the wealthy Hamilton family who lived in Sydney, and the Palmers, a working-class family from Melbourne. The characters of John Palmer (Peter Phelps) and spoilt rich girl Angela Hamilton (Ally Fowler) meet by chance whilst John is on the run from the police for a murder he did not commit. The two fall in love, not realising that they are actually twins, separated at birth 20 years earlier following an affair between their parents, David Palmer (Tom Richards) and Patricia (Rowena Wallace). Early episodes saw the pair discover the truth about their heritage and showed the problems and strains this put on their own relationship and those of their immediate families. While on the run John is protected in Sydney by Fiona Thompson (Pat McDonald), a former madame and prostitute and now boarding house owner who had raised John when he was a young boy. With a new identity and now going by the name of Scott Edwards, John attempts to build a new life, with the help of Fiona and her friend Jill Taylor (Kim Lewis), another former prostitute.

Following the shock revelation of John and Angela's true heritage and the subsequent reunion of the two families, a series of dramatic events unfolds, intertwining the lives of both the Palmers and the Hamiltons. The Palmers' newly-wed daughter Susan (Ann Henderson-Stiers) receives the shock revelation that her husband Bill Todd is responsible for the murder of which John was suspected, and Bill is subsequently convicted and jailed. The Palmers' youngest son Kevin (Stephen Comey) and his girlfriend Lynn Hardy (Antonia Murphy) find their lives turned upside down when she becomes pregnant, despite their families' best efforts to keep them apart. Father and son David and John Palmer's relationship continues to deteriorate, and when David and Patricia meet up again 20 years on from their initial affair, old passions resurface, culminating in the destruction of both their marriages—David's marriage to dedicated housewife Beryl (Leila Hayes) and Patricia's marriage to the wealthy and successful businessman Gordon (Brian Blain). Amidst a web of intrigue concerning the numerous instabilities within both families, and shady big-business deals concerning Gordon's company, his ownership of country estate Woombai, and the increasing involvement of his manipulative son Wayne (Ian Rawlings), the drama builds throughout the season.

The character of Patricia rapidly developed into the main focus of the show, with her neurotic bitchiness and scheming being the source of most of the drama and tension between the other characters. Patricia became a popular character among viewers and was dubbed 'Pat the Rat'. New characters introduced later in the season included Patricia's best friend, the dizzy socialite Charlie Bartlett (Sarah Kemp), Rob Keegan (Noel Hodda), the younger brother of Beryl Palmer who falls in love with and marries Angela, and Paul Sheppard (Mark Ferguson), the morally confused and neurotic grandson of Patricia's former lover James Sheppard, who left Patricia a substantial amount of his fortune following his death.

=== Season 2 ===
As season 2 kicks off, Patricia is sinking further into depression after she overdoses on sleeping pills and Susan steps in to help take care of her as a live-in nurse, while scheming Wayne tricks Patricia into signing her power of attorney over to him to give him power over his father, Gordon. Shortly after, Susan becomes the first of the main cast to depart the series as she leaves to be closer to her husband Bill's prison. John tracks down his real father Martin Healy (Paul Sonkkila)—a prominent officer in the Air Force—and also manages to find Patricia's estranged sister, Margaret Dunne (Ilona Rodgers). The reunion of Patricia with Martin and Margaret sparks off a series of dramatic storylines as old secrets are revealed and old tensions between Patricia and Margaret resurface. At the same time, we are introduced to Martin's children, John and Angela's half-brother Peter (Brett Climo), and adoptive half-sister, Jennifer (Jodie Yemm). A major turning point in the series comes with the eventual suicide of Martin, after his past crimes catch up with him. When Margaret removes his suicide note from beside the body, David comes under suspicion of Martin's murder.

Other plot developments included Jill's involvement with illegal Irish immigrant Brian O'Donnell (Lee James), whom she agrees to marry so he can obtain a visa to stay in the country. Fiona is shattered when her boarding house on Manly Terrace burns down, almost killing Jill in the inferno. A heated love triangle occurs between the characters of Angela, Rob Keegan (Noel Hodda), and Paul Sheppard, following which all three characters depart the show. Unlucky Jill is shockingly raped by drifter Terry Hansen (Andrew Clarke), who is revealed to be Fiona's long-lost son, whom she conceived with on-off past love, Scott Thompson (David Nettheim). In a highly controversial storyline, Terry was treated by the scriptwriters as a sympathetic character despite the rape and his subsequent spell in prison. Later in the season, Gordon marries neighbour, Barbara Armstrong (Cornelia Frances), and after they enter a business deal with Barbara's entrepreneur brother, Stephen Morrell (Michael Long), they are shocked when Stephen suddenly marries Patricia after a whirlwind romance. This leads to the introduction of a third family for the show—the wealthy and powerful Morrells, including Stephen's mother Dee (Mary Ward), a ruthless elderly businesswoman, and his daughter, scheming and beautiful, Amanda (Alyce Platt). Following Dee's death from a heart condition, major developments occur when the contents of her will are revealed, affecting the other characters' lives dramatically. Upon Dee's insistence that a male heir continue her business, Stephen tracks down the young man he believes to be his long-lost son, Andy Green (Danny Roberts).

=== Season 3 ===
When season 3 starts, Fiona is shocked by the return of Scott Thompson, whom Jill had contacted to pay for her abortion. Patricia's short marriage to Stephen unravels and she seeks comfort in the arms of psychiatrist, Matt Kennedy (Vince Martin), while continuing her bitter feud with sister Margaret, which climaxes in the siblings being trapped in a bush fire at Woombai, and finally making their peace when Margaret saves Patricia's life.

Major changes in the cast occur with the departure of original twin, John (Peter Phelps); a temporary departure for Stephen Morrell (Michael Long); whilst Doug (Syd Conabere) and Rosie Palmer (Anne Haddy) also left the regular cast. To replace the departed characters, there was the introduction of a fourth family in the form of the Melbourne-based, working-class, O'Brien family; Mike (Ken James) and Heather (Rona Coleman), and their teenage children, Katie (Jane Seaborn) and Jeff (Craig Morrison) - move in next door to the Palmers, and quickly become involved in the dramas of the other characters. Mike's brother, Jim (Sean Scully) arrived a few weeks later. The Palmers go on to experience further problems when David has an affair with Patricia's sister Margaret, which finally ends his marriage to Beryl. She soon starts dating Jim O'Brien, but David's happiness with Margaret is short-lived when she dies following injuries sustained in a plane crash. Beryl's happiness is also shattered when Jim dies following a bomb explosion on David's booby-trapped truck. Lynn (Antonia Murphy) becomes involved with Andy Green while Kevin is working overseas, and the two fall in love, leaving Lynn confused and contemplating suicide on the edge of a cliff. Lynn eventually chooses to stay with Kevin, and they both decide to move overseas with son Davey, and leave the series for good.

Patricia finds herself embroiled with shady businessman, Roger Carlyle (Leslie Dayman), and his son, Luke (Peter Cousens). Shortly after Luke embezzles Patricia's company, Luke is found by Beryl murdered, and Patricia becomes the prime suspect in the police's search to find his killer, leading to a series of attempts on her life, all orchestrated by Roger. Other new characters introduced during the season include Irene Fisher (Judy Nunn), a GP who opens a new boarding house with Fiona; Karen Fox (Lyndel Rowe), a deceitful businesswoman who wreaks havoc whilst having a romantic affair with Wayne; Ross Newman (Robin Stewart), a gambling-addicted surgeon, under the influence of Roger Carlyle; and Bob 'Mitch' Mitchell (Philip Quast), an ex-convict who becomes romantically involved with Amanda whilst coming to blows with Karen and Wayne.

=== Season 4 ===
Season 4 features a major turning point with the departure of its most popular character, Patricia Hamilton Morrell Palmer Dunne, only two weeks into the season. When Rowena Wallace chose to leave, the producers initially attempted to replace Patricia with several strong female antagonists in the form of Karen Fox (Lyndel Rowe), Leigh and Caroline Morrell but none of these proved as successful. This led to the producers deciding to bring back the character of Patricia back, now played by actress Belinda Giblin, having undergone a drastic facial reconstruction following plastic surgery in Rio de Janeiro, and now known as "Alison Carr". Further cast changes include the departure of the entire O'Brien family - not long after the tragic death of Jeff, in a house fire he caused whilst drunk on vodka - as well as an original character, Jill O'Donnell, who all left during the aftermath of Patricia's disappearance in episode 584. The season begins with Patricia finally marrying David, before fleeing to Rio to escape Roger Carlyle. Meanwhile, Wayne is tricked by Karen into marrying her, believing she has covered up the murder of Mitch for him, unaware Mitch is not dead at all and was paid by Karen to disappear. Shortly after the truth is revealed, Karen is found dead in the creek at Dural, having been pushed off a bridge following a confrontation with escort Liz Smith who is in love with Gordon. Beryl gives birth a baby son Robert, but he is abducted by Dr. Ross Newman, and a nurse, Gloria Dutton; then again later by Leigh. Fiona becomes involved in a bitter battle to have deceased fiancé Barney Adams' secret wartime diaries published, running into opposition from Colonel Bainbridge and his son Chris. The Colonel commits suicide and Chris sets out on a vendetta of revenge against Fiona. Karen Fox tricks Wayne into marriage after convincing him that he has killed Mitch. Wayne goes missing shortly after, worried that he will face jail for murder and whilst he is away a look-alike arrives and fools everyone into believing he is Wayne. Ian Rawlings plays dual roles as both Wayne Hamilton and Gary Evans. One of the bigger storylines for the season sees a planned redevelopment threaten to destroy Woombai under the direction of the scheming Bill Ashley (Peter Dahlsen) although the development is a scam. When Amanda Morrell overhears a conversation that could jeopardise the entire scheme, she mysteriously goes missing, leaving the Morrell family distraught and Caroline desperate to find her. Caroline begins to become closer to recently returned ex-husband Stephen, and she warns his new love interest Jenny Turner to stay away from him and the two become rivals. The father of Leigh Palmer's baby, Richard Crampton arrived, deciding he wants custody and he hires Neil Duffy (Geoffrey Rowe) to try to buy his son from Leigh. When this fails, Crampton starts terrorising her and hires a hitman, Nick Stafford to go after Leigh. Crampton ends up dying at Stafford's hands after David has already fired a shot at him. David and Fiona go to Rio in search of Patricia, David having received an amount of money that he believes must have come from her. Following plastic surgery to hide injuries sustained at the hands of a thug who beat her up in Rio de Janeiro, Patricia returns to Australia under a new identity; Alison Carr and she begins to start trying to clear "her friend's" Patricia's name for the murder of Luke Carlyle. Mary Reynolds turns up at Woombai, lost and confused and claiming that Patricia is her mother

=== Season 5 ===
This season sees a significant change of focus for the serial, with storylines shifting from the business intrigue and corporate scheming of the previous couple of years, to more down-to-earth storylines with humour and comedy being introduced, along with a lot of new younger characters.

A new production regime swept away popular regular characters, including the long-running Barbara Hamilton, and also Irene Fisher; both were hastily written out of the series in very quick succession. In Cornelia Frances's 2003 autobiography, she states that it was not her decision to leave the series, but that of a producer, Posie Jacobs, who suddenly axed hers, and Judy Nunn's character, due to there being an overabundance of "aunty" types in the cast.

Other characters that failed to make it to the end of the season included Leigh Palmer, killed-off very early in the season; Tim Palmer, Donna Palmer, Spider Webb (Willy Fennell), Brett Keegan, Adam Tate, Samantha Morrell and Mary Reynolds were also written out after relatively short stints in the series. Consequently, there was an influx of less well-received new characters including Fiona's niece, prim and proper Janice Reid ; a new tenant in Fiona's boarding house, May Walters a young runaway, Craig Maxwell, who mistook Beryl Palmer as his real mother; and Doug Fletcher came in as a new love interest for Caroline. There was also a trio of new, good-looking younger characters; Glenn Young (Mark Conroy), Debbie Halliday and Ginny Doyle and in a nod to the early years, the return of a re-cast Susan Todd Palmer, played now by Oriana Panozzo.

Storylines see Samantha Morrell shocked after running into Bill Ashley and discovering new information regarding her missing sister Amanda, but the search that follows ends with devastating news as they discover Amanda died a few months earlier having been forced into a life of drugs and prostitution. Leigh Palmer commits suicide early in the season, outside the court where she is facing sentencing for kidnapping baby Robert—bringing an end to one of the series longest-running storylines.

Fiona meets her bossy niece Janice for the first time, arriving just as Fiona is to undergo an operation to remove her kidney and together they launch a campaign to save an old mansion house that Fiona once lived in with old friend May Walters. When an angry Caroline starts arguing with Alison whilst she is driving, a serious car crash ensues, with Barbara and Gordon's lives left at risk and ultimately leaving Barbara with serious facial scars and Gordon with amnesia believing he is still married to Patricia. Alison uses the situation to her advantage to permanently remove Barbara from Gordon's life and Caroline finds herself serving time in prison.

Craig Maxwell turns up in Sydney, looking for his mother, Ruby Hawkins, who gave him up when he was a baby, and who happens to be the exact double of Beryl Palmer. Initial misunderstandings are resolved and Craig accepts that Beryl isn't Ruby. Beryl subsequently helps Craig track Ruby down. At this point Leila Hayes plays both the roles of Beryl and Ruby.

Ned Parker and Micky Pratt hold Janice, May, Gordon and Neville hostage at the mansion, following Ned's escape from jail. Micky is killed when she walks out into the road without seeing a car heading towards her. As the siege comes to an end, Patricia's fingerprints are discovered on a gun that was used and Alison's real identity is finally revealed.

=== Season 6 ===
Departing characters included another original character, David Palmer (Tom Richards), May Walters and Owen Brooke—all left at the end of season 5—and relatively recent additions, Ginny Doyle and Glen Young, were both killed off in a car accident involving Wayne. Debbie Halliday also left during the season but returned for the final episode. New additions include feuding brothers, Nick (John Hannon) and Michael Benson (Phillip Spencer-Harris); a new set of twins, Greg (Tom Jennings) and Sarah Hudson (Melissa Docker); and, in an attempt to boost flagging ratings, producers finally lured back Rowena Wallace, who'd originally played Patricia, to play her own twin sister Pamela Hudson — a storyline which ultimately failed to save the series. Caroline discovers that Susan is alive and well despite being presumed dead and she is in hiding from Wayne. When an upset Wayne gets drunk and drives off, Glen and Ginny go after him and a high-speed chase follows which leads to Glen's and Ginny's deaths. Wayne turns everyone against him and when he is shot there are no shortage of suspects. Beryl finds herself behind bars for the shooting, having realised Susan was guilty and so she lied to protect her daughter. While in prison Beryl meets Pamela Hudson, who is the spitting image of Patricia. It is soon discovered that Pamela and Patricia are twins, separated at birth. While Patricia lived the good life, Pamela had a much tougher upbringing. Andy learns that he has a baby daughter, Madonna, who is the result of a fling with Jodie Frazer. When Jodie decides that she can't cope with bringing up a baby on her own and dumps Madonna on Janice, Andy steps in and decides to be a proper father to the girl. Gordon goes into business with Bill Sanders, Doug and Alison at Sanders' Air Charter. Just as everything seems to be going well, a plane is sabotaged. The company appears to be falling apart until a mystery company puts up money to keep it going. Gordon discovers to his surprise that it was Wayne who was behind the rescue. Although father and son have been on opposing sides for some time, Gordon remarks that it appears that Wayne might have changed for the better. As he settles with new wife Beryl and her son, Robert in Melbourne, Gordon finds himself content. Benson is a psychiatrist brought in to help Wayne remember who shot him. Nick has a fraught relationship with his brother, Michael. Very much a ladies' man, Nick is attracted to Alison but he also finds himself attracted to sister, Pamela. There ensues a furious struggle between Alison and Pamela, using powerful mind games to try to destroy each other. Nick eventually chooses Pamela over Alison and drives off with her to begin a new life. Doug and Caroline marry, and Caroline is revealed as the author of a book entitled My Sister My Love, based on the lives of the Hamiltons and the Palmers, despite the changes of character names. Doug tries to stop Caroline promoting the book, warning her that they're going to lose all their friends, but Caroline ignores him. She even writes a sequel. Caroline discovers that she's pregnant, but also learns that the baby could be born with Down's Syndrome and she opts to have an abortion, later deciding that she can't go through with it. She doesn't tell Doug that she's pregnant, but instead decides to leave him and start life afresh elsewhere. Doug learns about the pregnancy, though, and he chases after Caroline and tells her that he loves her, and that he wants her to have the baby and that he doesn't care if its handicapped, wanting them all to be together as a family. Caroline agrees and Doug buys a fish shop in Melbourne! Charlie meets Todd Buckley (Paul Dawber), a fitness instructor who works at her gym, and there is an instant attraction. The couple quickly announce their engagement, despite attempts by Alison to break them up. Charlie becomes so appalled at Alison's behaviour and schemes that she throws her out, leaving Alison staying in a cheap, run-down motel. Charlie enjoys a fairytale wedding to Todd and prepares to live happily ever after. Sarah Hudson arouses Wayne's interest, and they begin to spend time together. Sarah tries to throw herself at Wayne, but he's wary after all his bad experiences with women. Meanwhile, he puts his plan into action to take everything and everyone away from Alison. With Wayne believing his wife Susan is dead, Alison decides to use Susan to get at Wayne but the plan backfires when Susan is left dead on the lounge floor at Dural, having apparently been strangled by Wayne. Realising that he has finally gone too far, he turns to the telephone and makes a call. He asks for the police. Alison faces bankruptcy but is reunited with David. The show ends in a similar vein to how it began. At Fiona's mansion boarding house, a young couple arrive and ask for a room. The young woman is heavily pregnant. Fiona takes them in, just as she had with David and Patricia all those years ago. The woman gives birth to twins, a boy and a girl and the story seems to have finally come full circle. The final episode ends with a montage of many cast members, both past and present.

== Cast ==
The main cast of Sons and Daughters are initially listed in the closing credits under their respective families (The Hamilton family, the Palmer family, the Morell family, the O'Brien family), interspersed with separate slides for characters (such as Fiona Thompson and Jill Taylor) who don't easily fit into a category. This was followed by the guest actors of each episode (referred to as "guest artists").

From episode 737, the credits were changed to list the main cast in alphabetical order.

There were occasional errors during the series run, such as cast members credited in episodes long after they departed or characters listed under their wrong married name.

Actor	Character	Appears in
The Hamilton family
Rowena Wallace	Patricia "Pat the Rat" Hamilton Morrell Palmer; Pamela Hudson	series 1–4, episodes 2–536 series 6, episodes 905–944
Brian Blain	Gordon Hamilton	series 1–6, episodes 2–972
Ally Fowler	Angela Hamilton Palmer Keegan	series 1–3, episodes 2–424
Ian Rawlings	Wayne Hamilton Morrell	series 1–6, episodes 2–972
Cornelia Frances	Barbara Armstrong Hamilton	series 1–5, episodes 13–736
...
Pat McDonald	Fiona Thompson	series 1–6, episodes 1–972
Kim Lewis	Jill Taylor O'Donnell	series 1–4, episodes 1–584
Noel Hodda	Rob Keegan	series 1–6, episodes 74–896
Mark Ferguson	Paul Sheppard	series 1–3, episodes 112–443
Paul Sonkkila	Martin Healy	series 2, episodes 186–252
Grant Piro	Tony Parker	series 2–3, episodes 255–462
Danny Roberts	Andrew Green	series 2–6, episodes 342–982
Sarah Kemp	Charlie Bartlett	series 1–6, episodes 43–972
The Palmer family
Leila Hayes	Beryl Palmer Hamilton	series 1–6, episodes 1–972
Tom Richards	David Palmer	series 1–6, episodes 1–972
Peter Phelps	John Palmer	series 1–3, episodes 1–424
Ann Henderson-Stires; Oriana Panozzo	Susan Palmer Todd Hamilton	series 1–2, episodes 1–212 series 5–6, episodes 731–972
Stephen Comey	Kevin Palmer	series 1–3, episodes 1–466
Antonia Murphy	Lynn Hardy Palmer	series 1–3, episodes 5–466
Syd Conabere	Doug Palmer	series 1–3, episodes 10–398
Anne Haddy	Rosie Andrews Palmer	series 1–4, episodes 30–534
Lisa Crittenden	Leigh Palmer	series 4–5, episodes 534–699
The Morrell family
Michael Long	Stephen Morrell	series 2–4, episodes 267–651
Alyce Platt	Amanda Morrell	series 2–4, episodes 286–594
Abigail	Caroline Morrell Fletcher	series 4–6, episodes 554–971
Sally Tayler	Samantha Morrell	series 4–5, episodes 587–740
The O'Brien family
Ken James	Mike O'Brien	series 3–4, episodes 387–584
Rona Coleman	Heather O'Brien	series 3–4, episodes 387–692
Jane Seaborn	Katie O'Brien	series 3–4, episodes 387–584
Craig Morrison	Jeff O'Brien	series 3, episodes 387–507
...
Belinda Giblin	Allison Carr	series 4–6, episodes 630–972
Jared Robinson	Craig Maxwell	series 5–6, episodes 731–971
Mark Conroy	Glen Young	series 5–6, episodes 735–887
Angela Kennedy	Ginny Doyle	series 5–6, episodes 789–887
Rima Te Wiata	Janice Reid	series 5–6, episodes 714–972
Shannon Kenny	Debby Halliday	series 5–6, episodes 750–971
Normie Rowe	Doug Fletcher	series 5–6, episodes 734–971
Phillip Spencer-Harris	Michael Benson	series 5–6, episodes 858–970
Haydon Samuels	Tick McCarthy	series 5–6, episodes 863–952
John Hannon	Nick Benson	series 6, episodes 903–944
Paul Dawber	Todd Buckley	series 6, episodes 945–972
Melissa Docker	Sarah Hudson	series 6, episodes 945–972
Tom Jennings	Greg Hudson	series 6, episodes 942–972

=== Opening titles sequence ===
Each episode opens with sepia-toned portraits of the main cast members, which change from year to year. There are some anomalies, such as Judy Nunn (who is credited as "guest artist" for her entire two-year run) being included over cast members who never appear in the opening. They include (in chronological order):

- Peter Phelps as John Palmer (series 1–3, episodes 1–434)
- Ally Fowler as Angela Hamilton Keegan (series 1–2, episodes 1–292)
- Rowena Wallace as Patricia Hamilton Morrell (series 1–4, episodes 1–545)
- Tom Richards as David Palmer (series 1–5, episodes 1–860)
- Pat McDonald as Fiona Thompson (all episodes)
- Brian Blain as Gordon Hamilton (all episodes)
- Leila Hayes as Beryl Palmer Hamilton (all episodes)
- Kim Lewis as Jill Taylor O’Donnell (series 1–4, episodes 1–584)
- Ian Rawlings as Wayne Hamilton Morrell (all episodes)
- Ann Henderson-Stires as Susan Todd (series 1, episodes 1–174)
- Stephen Comey as Kevin Palmer (series 1–2, episodes 1–352)
- Noel Hodda as Rob Keegan (series 2, episodes 277–292)
- Cornelia Frances as Barbara Hamilton (series 2–5, episodes 293–736)
- Antonia Murphy as Lynn Palmer (series 2–4, episodes 293–500)
- Danny Roberts as Andy Green (series 3–6, episodes 353–972)
- Alyce Platt as Amanda Morrell (series 3–4, episodes 425–596)
- Jane Seaborn as Katie O’Brien (series 3–4, episodes 493–596)
- Sarah Kemp as Charlie Bartlett Buckley (series 4–6, episodes 546–972)
- Abigail as Caroline Morrell Fletcher (series 4–6, episodes 585–972)
- Lisa Crittenden as Leigh Palmer (series 4, episodes 597–696)
- Michael Long as Stephen Morrell (series 4, episodes 601–652)
- Judy Nunn as Irene Fisher (series 4–5, episodes 653–736)
- Belinda Giblin as Alison Carr (series 5–6, episodes 697–972)
- Mark Conroy as Glen Young (series 5–6, episodes 737–868)
- Jared Robinson as Craig Maxwell (series 5–6, episodes 737–972)
- Normie Rowe as Doug Fletcher (series 5–6, episodes 861–972)
- Oriana Panozzo as Susan Hamilton (series 6, episodes 893–972)

=== Notable guest artists ===
Actor	Character	Appears in
Gaynor Martin	Prue Armstrong	series 1, episodes 62–103
Ilona Rodgers	Margaret Dunne	series 2–3, episodes 181–422
Katie Brinson	Wendy Armstrong	series 2, episodes 183–216
Brett Climo	Peter Healy	series 2, episodes 201–276
Jodie Yemm	Jennifer Healy	series 2, episodes 219–257
Mary Ward	Dee Morrell	series 2, episodes 305–337
Sean Scully	Jim O'Brien	series 3–4, episodes 401–609
Judy Nunn	Irene Fisher	series 3–5, episodes 422–738
Lyndel Rowe	Karen Fox Hamilton	series 3–4, episodes 461–562
Robert Mammone	Tim Palmer	series 4–5, episodes 552–746
Joanna Lockwood	Jenny Turner Morrell	series 4, episodes 572–651
Tony Ward	Roland Armstrong	series 4, episodes 588–639
Brett Partridge	Brett Keegan	series 4, episodes 619–671
Simone Buchanan	Donna Jackson Palmer	series 4–5, episodes 646–728
Nick Tate	James Hamilton	series 4–5, episodes 671–708

== Family trees ==
=== Palmers ===
Doug Palmer	Rosie Palmer
Martin Healy	Patricia Hamilton	David Palmer	Beryl Palmer	Frannie Henderson	Ray Palmer
John Palmer	Rob Keegan	Angela Hamilton	Tim Palmer
Bill Todd	Susan Palmer	Wayne Hamilton	Leigh Palmer	Richard Crampton
Lynn Hardy	Kevin Palmer	Shane Palmer
Davey Palmer

=== Hamiltons ===
Beryl Palmer
Barbara Armstrong
Nancy Andrews	Gordon Hamilton	Patricia Dunne	Martin Healy	James Hamilton
Amanda Morrell	Wayne Hamilton	Mary Reynolds
Karen Fox	Susan Palmer	John Palmer	Angela Hamilton	Rob Keegan

=== Keegans ===
Bob Keegan	Aileen Keegan
?	?	Rob Keegan	Angela Hamilton	Gordon Hamilton	Beryl Keegan	David Palmer
Brett Keegan
Bill Todd	Susan Palmer	Wayne Hamilton	Kevin Palmer	Lynn Hardy	Robert Palmer
David Palmer

== Broadcast schedule ==
Seven Network aired the first episode as a 90-minute special on 18 January 1982 in Sydney and Melbourne, during the Christmas/New Year non-ratings period. There are 972 half-hour episodes, although during the series' original run, later episodes were shown in an hour-long format, although the date of transition to hour-long episodes varied across Australia. The series was broadcast on the Seven Network, initially (in Sydney and Melbourne) four days a week for half an hour at 19:00-19:30. In 1984, Sydney broadcasts changed to one-hour episodes on Sunday and Monday at 19:30-20:30, and in later years, most Australian stations aired Sons and Daughters as two one-hour shows per week, and finally in one hour-long show per week. It became the highest-rated programme in its slot, and was the most watched Australian soap of the 1980s. The series eventually began to suffer from declining ratings, and was ultimately cancelled in early 1987 though the final episodes did not screen until after Christmas on 27 December 1987 at 6.30pm Sunday night on Channel Seven Sydney, and two weeks later in Melbourne.

During the 1990s the TV series was repeated throughout Australia, usually in early-morning and daytime slots first at 9.30am weekday mornings then at the later time of 5.30am early mornings.

The series has been repeated 4 times in Australia, firstly on Foxtel between from 1997, with the final episode airing in mid-2000. Seven Network began another re-run in October 2006, airing weekdays at 10:00. This was discontinued in early 2007, then resumed in July 2008, airing on Wednesday nights, usually around midnight. In October 2013, episodes were airing Tuesday and Thursday mornings at 3:30 am. Episode 461 aired on 8 October 2013. Series was again replayed on its original broadcast TV channel Seven during 2014-2018 on Sunday mornings first as a half hour at 5.00am and then later in double episodes 5.00-6.00am before final episode (972) aired, in HD, on 11 August 2019 on Sunday morning 5am.

7TWO has repeated the series twice, in full. First from 2 November 2009 until 9 October 2013. To mark the 40th anniversary, a second run began Monday, 3 January 2022. Four episodes aired back to back each weekday at 2.30pm, later moving to 1.00pm in October 2022 for the final season. The final episode aired at 2.30pm on Friday, 16 December 2022.

=== Episodes ===
Although Sons and Daughters was screened by all stations of the Seven Network and many regional stations, each one scheduled the series independently and at their own pace, in a combination of 30-minute and 60-minute episodes. The table below refers only to the original broadcast dates by ATN7, the Sydney station of the Seven Network, and HSV7, its counterpart in Melbourne. For the first two seasons, both stations transmitted the serial at the same time and pace, except for a brief period in early 1983 when the Sydney station was an episode or two behind Melbourne. In subsequent seasons they scheduled the show independently of each other, partly because Sydney moved to screening it in an hour-long format a year earlier than Melbourne. Melbourne broadcasts were ahead of Sydney for two seasons, after which Sydney took the lead and completed the series two weeks earlier than Melbourne.

Season	Original broadcast (ATN7 and HSV7 Australia)		No. of episodes	
Season	Season premiere	Season finale	No. of episodes	
1	18 January 1982 (SYD/MEL)	11 November 1982 (SYD/MEL)	174	1–174
2	31 January 1983 (SYD/MEL)	11 November 1983 (SYD/MEL)	178	175–352
3	6 February 1984 (MEL) 26 February 1984 (SYD)	9 November 1984 (MEL) 14 January 1985 (SYD)	176	353–528
4	13 January 1985 (MEL) 20 January 1985 (SYD)	4 November 1985 (MEL) 8 November 1985 (SYD)	168	529–696
5	13 January 1986 (SYD) 20 January 1986 (MEL)	6 November 1986 (SYD) 10 November 1986 (MEL)	172	697–868
6	4 January 1987 (SYD) 18 January 1987 (MEL)	27 December 1987 (SYD) 10 January 1988 (MEL)	104	869–972

== International Broadcasting ==
=== Ireland ===
Debuted on the RTÉ One network in October 1984 airing on Fridays at 2pm. The series has been repeated multiple times on RTE throughout the 80s and 90s during their afternoon schedule.

=== New Zealand ===
Sons and Daughters debuted on TV2 as a feature-length telemovie (the first three episodes) on Sunday 9 February 1986 at 7.25pm.

The series was then shown on TV2 as five half-hour episodes every week at 6.00pm, Monday to Friday, all year round (as opposed to four half-hour, or, two one-hour weekly episodes, for approximately ten months, as broadcast in Australia) from Monday 10 February 1986 until Friday 22 July 1988. Kim Lewis, Antonia Murphy and Ian Rawlings appeared as overseas guests on Telethon in June 1988, after the series had been cancelled in Australia.

On Monday 25 July 1988, the series was moved to TV One and aired at 5.25pm as a lead-in to the Network News at Six. The final episode of Sons and Daughters was broadcast on Wednesday 13 December 1989 at 5.25pm.

=== United Kingdom ===
Sons and Daughters has been broadcast on four British TV channels: The first airing was on the ITV network from 6 February 1983 when Central Independent Television started the serial. Five months later in July, Yorkshire Television began, and over the following two years, all mainland ITV regions across the UK picked up the series and were free to show it as and when they wished; it was therefore seen as regional daytime filler and, despite strong ratings for daytime, there were rarely, if ever, articles about it in the British media, or any interviews with its stars (except for one notable feature on TV-am when Anne Diamond interviewed Ian Rawlings, Pat McDonald and Brian Blain in January 1988, after the series had been cancelled in Australia).

The series was initially shown in most ITV areas three episodes every week at 15:30-16:00, Wednesday to Friday, all year round (as opposed to four half-hour, or, two one-hour weekly episodes, for approximately ten months, as broadcast in Australia). However, TVS aired the series 17:15-17:45 between 1984 and 1987, whilst Granada, originally chose 18:00-18:30, before they too moved the series to daytime. Towards the end of their respective runs, some ITV regions increased episodes to four or five every week (Central, Ulster, TSW and Yorkshire), whilst others (Thames, Anglia, TVS) reduced their output to two, or just one per week, demonstrating the wide range of viewing patterns across the UK. The Ulster region (UTV) broadcast the final episode at 1.45pm on Wednesday, 14 October 1992, with ‘A Country Practice’ awarded the timeslot the following day. The last ITV region to air the final episode was STV, broadcast on 27 July 1995. During the 1980s, Sons and Daughters achieved consolidated viewing figures of 6 million across the ITV network.

The series was also given further broadcasts by Super Channel between January 1987 and January 1989. In November 1992, the entire series was aired on the newly launched UK Gold. Finally, following its launch in March 1997, Channel 5 began broadcasting Sons and Daughters for a nationwide re-run where it ran 13:30-14:00, Monday to Friday, from March 1998 until the end of the year. This ended part-way through the second season at episode 212, but in January 2002, the programme was reinstated to the schedules in an early-hours-of-the-morning Saturday and Sunday slot, continuing from episode 213, until the last episode was broadcast in November 2005.

== Home media ==
In July 2021, all episodes were made available to stream free on 7plus.

From November 2020 to December 2022, ‘Via Vision Entertainment’ released all six seasons to DVD.

=== Compilation DVD ===
Title	Format	Episodes #	Discs	Region 4 (Australia)	Special features	Distributors
Sons and Daughters – The Best of Pat The Rat	DVD	12 Selected Episodes	02	9 October 2006	Audio commentary on Episode 693 by Tom Richards (David Palmer) and Belinda Giblin (Alison Carr) Stills gallery Both full-length versions of the Sons and Daughters theme	Umbrella Entertainment
The Sons and Daughters Interviews	DVD	Feature Documentary	01	August 2007	N/A	Video Solutions
Sons and Daughters – The Classic Cliffhangers Collection	DVD	12 Selected Episodes	02	4 February 2008	Audio commentary on Episode 868 by Ian Rawlings (Wayne Hamilton); Audio commentary on Episode 972 by Normie Rowe (Doug Fletcher); Promotion for Tom Richards' Sons and Daughters Interviews DVD	Umbrella Entertainment

=== Via Vision Entertainment (Season Sets) ===
Season	DVD title	Format	Episodes	Discs	Region 4 (Australia)	Special features	More
1	Sons and Daughters – Collection One	DVD	174 (Ep# 001-174)	25	18 November 2020	Both full-length versions of the Sons and Daughters theme	Via Vision Entertainment; 4350 minutes; 1.33:1 (4:3) aspect ratio; Dolby Digital 2.0 Mono; ACB rating: PG
2	Sons and Daughters – Collection Two	DVD	178 (Ep# 175-352)	26	3 March 2021	None	Via Vision Entertainment; 4100 minutes; 1.33:1 (4:3) aspect ratio; Dolby Digital 2.0 Mono; ACB rating: PG
3	Sons and Daughters – Collection Three	DVD	176 (Ep# 353-528)	25	20 October 2021	None	Via Vision Entertainment; 4224 minutes; 1.33:1 (4:3) aspect ratio; Dolby Digital 2.0 Mono; ACB rating: PG
4	Sons and Daughters – Collection Four	DVD	168 (Ep# 529-696)	24	23 March 2022	Audio commentary on Episode 693 by Tom Richards and Belinda Giblin	ACB rating: PG
5	Sons and Daughters – Collection Five	DVD	172 (Ep# 697-868)	25	26 October 2022	None	ACB rating: PG
6	Sons and Daughters – Collection Six	DVD	104 (Ep# 869-972)	15	7 December 2022	Audio commentary on Episode 868 by Ian Rawlings Audio commentary on Episode 972 by Normie Rowe Stills Gallery	ACB rating: PG
1–2	Sons and Daughters: Years One & Two	DVD	(Ep# 001-352)	51	5 April 2023	Both full-length versions of the Sons and Daughters theme	ACB rating: PG
3–4	Sons and Daughters: Years Three & Four	DVD	(Ep# 353-696)	49	7 June 2023	Audio commentary on Episode 693 by Tom Richards and Belinda Giblin	ACB rating: PG

=== Streaming Services ===
Title	Format	Episodes	Release date	Distributors
Sons and Daughters (Season 01)	Streaming	Episodes 01-174	17 February 2021	7plus
Sons and Daughters (Season 02)	Streaming	Episodes 175-352	12 April 2021	7plus
Sons and Daughters (Season 03)	Streaming	Episodes 353–528	5 May 2021	7plus
Sons and Daughters (Season 04)	Streaming	Episodes 529-696	26 May 2021	7plus
Sons and Daughters (Season 05)	Streaming	Episodes 697–868	9 June 2021	7plus
Sons and Daughters (Season 06)	Streaming	Episodes 869–972	12 July 2021	7plus

=== Sons and Daughters: Cast album ===
In the early 1980s when Australia's Seven Network was broadcasting both Sons and Daughters and A Country Practice, it decided to cash in on the shows' success, and provide the shows with some publicity, by producing and releasing a cast album. The album was called All My Friends, and featured the cast of Sons and Daughters on the A-side and the cast of A Country Practice on the B-side.

A-side:

1. "Sons and Daughters Theme"
2. "Some Kind of Friend" (Ian Rawlings)
3. "Bosom Buddies" (Pat McDonald and Rowena Wallace)
4. "The More I See You" (Peter Phelps and Kim Lewis)
5. "Behind Closed Doors" (Tom Richards and Leila Hayes)
6. "Sometimes When We Touch" (Stephen Comey)
7. "Help Me Make It Through the Night" (Leila Hayes)
8. "Friends" (Rowena Wallace)

== Remakes ==
The series has inspired seven remakes produced under license from the original producers and based, initially, on the original story and character outlines. These are Verbotene Liebe (Germany, 1995–2015); Skilda världar (Sweden, 1996–2002); Apagorevmeni agapi (Greece, 1998); Cuori Rubati (Italy, 2002–2003) Zabranjena ljubav (Croatia, 2004–2008), Zabranena lubov (Bulgaria, 2008–2011) and Belahan Hati (Indonesia, 2001–2002).

== Awards and nominations ==
Year	Awards	Category	Nominee	Result
1983	Logie Awards	Most Popular Drama Series	Sons and Daughters	Won
1983	Logie Awards	Most Popular Lead Actress in a Series	Rowena Wallace	Won
1983	Logie Awards	Most Popular New Talent	Stephen Comey	Won
1984	Logie Awards	Most Popular Lead Actress in a Series	Rowena Wallace	Won
1984	Logie Awards	Best Lead Actress in a Series	Rowena Wallace	Won
1985	Logie Awards	Most Popular Personality on Australian Television	Rowena Wallace	Won
1985	Logie Awards	Best Lead Actress in a Series	Rowena Wallace	Won
1985	Logie Awards	Best Supporting Actor in a Series	Ian Rawlings	Won
