= Gene Evans =

American actor (1922–1998)

- Evans in 1976
- Born: Eugene Barton Evans; July 11, 1922; Holbrook, Arizona, U.S.
- Died: April 1, 1998 (aged 75); Jackson, Tennessee, U.S.
- Occupation: Actor
- Years active: 1947–1989
- Spouse(s): Mary Elaine Hert (m. 1968; died 1971) Patricia Ann Willis (14 January 1956 - ?) (divorced)

Eugene Barton Evans (July 11, 1922 – April 1, 1998) was an American actor who appeared in numerous television series, television films, and feature films between 1947 and 1989.

== Early life ==
Evans was born in Holbrook, Arizona and raised in Colton, California. Right after finishing high school, he began performing in summer stock at the Penthouse Theatre in Altadena, California. Evans served in the United States Army during World War II and achieved the rank of sergeant. He performed with a theatrical troupe of GIs in Europe.

== Career ==
Evans made his film debut in the 1947 film Under Colorado Skies as Henchman Red, and appeared in dozens of films and television programs. He specialized in playing tough guys, such as soldiers and lawmen.

Evans appeared in numerous films produced, directed, and written by Samuel Fuller. In his memoir, A Third Face, Fuller described meeting Evans when casting his Korean War film The Steel Helmet (1950). Fuller threw an M1 Garand rifle at Evans, who caught it and inspected it as a soldier would have done. Evans had been a United States Army engineer in World War II. Fuller kept Evans and refused John Wayne for the role and fought to keep Evans despite Robert L. Lippert and his partner wanting Larry Parks for the role. Fuller walked off the film and would not return until Evans was reinstated. Evans also appeared in Fuller's Fixed Bayonets!, Hell and High Water, Shock Corridor and lost 30 pounds to play the lead in Park Row.

Evans portrayed the authoritarian but wise father Rob McLaughlin on the 1956-1957 television series My Friend Flicka. He next co-starred in 1958 as Major Al Arthur in Damn Citizen, a film based on the life of crusading State Police superintendent Francis Grevemberg of Louisiana. In 1960, Evans was cast as Otis Stockert in "The Frontiersman" on the Western series Wichita Town. The same year, he was cast as Boone Hackett in the episode "Die Twice" of the Western series Johnny Ringo. He was cast in 1960 as army sergeant Dan Phillips in the episode "The Quota" of Riverboat. In the story, Phillips shanghais Grey Holden (Darren McGavin) and a crew member of the river vessel Enterprise to meet the army's "quota" for new recruits.

In 1961, Evans guest-starred as Sheriff Tom Wilson in "Incident on the Road Back" in Rawhide. He then was cast as Walter Kopek, an undercover agent of the United States Treasury Department in the 1963 episode "The Moonshiners" of GE True, hosted by Jack Webb. In this episode's plot, Kopek moves against a bootlegging operation in Florida run by the mobster Bill Munger (Robert Emhardt).

Evans was cast as the historical Winfield Scott Stratton, a miner in Colorado, in the 1964 episode "Sixty-Seven Miles of Gold" on Death Valley Days, hosted by Stanley Andrews.

In 1966, Evans appeared on the drama series Perry Mason as Sheriff "Moose" Dalton in "The Case of the Scarlet Scandal". He starred as well in Peopletoys in 1974 with Leif Garrett, and in the fall of 1976, Evans starred on the adventure series Spencer's Pilots.

In January 1979, Evans appeared as Garrison Southworth in one episode of Dallas. He guest-starred in 10 episodes of Gunsmoke. In 1965, Evans guest-starred as Jake Burnett in the episode "Vendetta" of The Legend of Jesse James. Two years later, he appeared as Deedricks in the episode "Breakout" of Custer.

In January 1982, Evans performed in the role of war reporter Clayton Kibbee in an episode of CBS's M*A*S*H titled "Blood and Guts". He also appeared on stage in the late 1980s as the gruesome Papa in the stage production Papa Is All, directed by playwright Tommy F. Scott in Jackson, Tennessee. Evans retired to a farm in Tennessee following his role in the original film version of Walking Tall.

He was active in the local theater in Jackson, Tennessee, with "On Borrowed Time" and "Love Letters" as well as "Papa is All".

== Death ==
Evans died at age 75 of heart failure at Jackson-Madison County General Hospital in Jackson, Tennessee, on April 1, 1998.

== Partial filmography ==
- Under Colorado Skies (1947) - Henchman Red
- Berlin Express (1948) - Train Sergeant (uncredited)
- Assigned to Danger (1948) - Joey
- Larceny (1948) - Horace (uncredited)
- Criss Cross (1949) - Donlan (uncredited)
- Mother Is a Freshman (1949) - Bit Part (uncredited)
- It Happens Every Spring (1949) - Batter Mueller (uncredited)
- The Asphalt Jungle (1950) - Policeman at Ciavelli's Apartment (uncredited)
- Armored Car Robbery (1950) - William 'Ace' Foster
- Never a Dull Moment (1950) - Hunter (uncredited)
- Wyoming Mail (1950) - Shep
- Dallas (1950) - Drunk in Saloon (uncredited)
- The Steel Helmet (1951) - Sergeant Zack
- Storm Warning (1951) - Ku Klux Klansman (uncredited)
- Sugarfoot (1951) - Billings
- I Was an American Spy (1951) - Corporal John Boone
- Ace in the Hole (1951) - Deputy Sheriff
- Force of Arms (1951) - Sergeant Smiley 'Mac' McFee
- Fixed Bayonets! (1951) - Sergeant Rock
- Mutiny (1952) - Hook
- Park Row (1952) - Phineas Mitchell
- Thunderbirds (1952) - Sergeant Mike Braggart
- The Golden Blade (1953) - Hadi
- Donovan's Brain (1953) - Dr. Frank Schratt
- Hell and High Water (1954) - Chief Holter
- The Long Wait (1954) - Servo
- Cattle Queen of Montana (1954) - Tom McCord
- Crashout (1955) - Maynard 'Monk' Collins
- Wyoming Renegades (1955) - Butch Cassidy / George Leroy Parker
- Jet Pilot (1957) - Airfield Sergeant (uncredited)
- The Helen Morgan Story (1957) - Whitey Krause
- The Sad Sack (1957) - Sergeant Major Elmer Pulley
- Damn Citizen (1958) - Major Al Arthur
- Young and Wild (1958) - Detective Sergeant Fred Janusz
- The Bravados (1958) - John Butler
- Money, Women and Guns (1958) - Sheriff Abner Crowley
- Revolt in the Big House (1958) - Lou Gannon
- The Giant Behemoth (1959) - Steve Karnes
- The Hangman (1959) - Big Murph Murphy
- Operation Petticoat (1959) - Chief Molumphry
- Gold of the Seven Saints (1961) - McCracken
- Shock Corridor (1963) - Boden
- Apache Uprising (1965) - Jess Cooney
- Nevada Smith (1966) – Sam Sand
- Waco (1966) - Deputy Sheriff Jim O'Neill
- The War Wagon (1967) - Deputy Hoag
- Support Your Local Sheriff! (1969) - Tom Danby
- The Ballad of Cable Hogue (1970) - Clete
- There Was a Crooked Man... (1970) - Colonel Wolff
- The Intruders (Shot in 1967, released in 1970) - Cole Younger
- Support Your Local Gunfighter (1971) - Butcher
- Walking Tall (1973) - Sheriff Al Thurman
- Gentle Savage (1973) - Sheriff McVaney
- Pat Garrett and Billy the Kid (1973) - Mr. Horrell
- Sidekicks (1974, TV movie) - Sam
- Knife for the Ladies (1974) - Hooker
- Peopletoys (1974) - Papa Doc
- The Macahans (1976) - Dutton
- Fire! (1977, TV movie) - Dan Harter
- The Magic of Lassie (1978) - Sheriff Andrews
- The Sacketts (1979, TV movie) - Benson Bigelow
- Sourdough (1981) - Narrator
- The Shadow Riders (1982, TV Movie) - Colonel Holiday Hammond (Gunrunner)
- Travis McGee (1983, TV movie) - Meyer
- Blame It on the Night (1984) - Extra (uncredited)
- The Alamo: 13 Days to Glory (1987, TV movie) - McGregor
- Once Upon a Texas Train (1988, TV movie) - Fargo Parker
- Split (1989) - Evangelist

== Television ==
- The Lone Ranger (1950–1951) (3 episodes)
  - (Season 1 Episode 37: "Devil's Pass") (1950) - Beef Corson
  - (Season 1 Episode 49: "The Star Witness") (1950) - Henchman Nat
  - (Season 2 Episode 21: "Behind the Law") (1951) - Henchman Link
- My Friend Flicka series (1955–1956) (39 episodes)
- The Restless Gun (1958) (Season 1 Episode 16: "The Coward") - Will Fetter
- Wagon Train (1958–1964) (2 episodes)
  - (Season 1 Episode 27: "The Sarah Drummond Story") (1958) - Jeb Drummond
  - (Season 7 Episode 25: "The Duncan McIvor Story") (1964) - Sergeant Jake Orly
- Death Valley Days (1960–1964) (2 episodes)
  - (Season 8 Episode 32: "Cap'n Pegleg") (1960) - Rufus Logan (uncredited)
  - (Season 12 Episode 14: "Sixty-Seven Miles of Gold") (1964) - Winfield Stratton
- Rawhide (1959–1965) (6 episodes)
  - (Season 2 Episode 7: "Incident at the Buffalo Smokehouse") (1959) - Wes Thomas
  - (Season 3 Episode 16: "Incident on the Road Back") (1961) – Tom Wilson
  - (Season 5 Episode 5: "Incident of the Prodigal Son") (1962) - Sam Hargis
  - (Season 6 Episode 3: "Incident at El Crucero") (1963) - Gus Cornelius
  - (Season 6 Episode 18: "Incident at Gila Flats") (1964) - Sergeant Pike
  - (Season 7 Episode 17: "Moment in the Sun") (1965) - Royal K. Shaw
- Bonanza (1960–1970) (3 episodes)
  - (Season 1 Episode 20: "The Fear Merchants") (1960) - Andy Fulmer
  - (Season 5 Episode 8: "Journey Remembered") (1963) - Lucas Rockwell
  - (Season 12 Episode 7: "The Trouble with Trouble") (1970) - Montana Perkins
- Alfred Hitchcock Presents (1962) (Season 7 Episode 28: "The Kerry Blue") - Ned O'Malley
- The Alfred Hitchcock Hour (1962) (Season 1 Episode 1: "A Piece of the Action") - Ed Krutcher
- The Virginian (1962–1970) (3 episodes)
  - (Season 1 Episode 13: "The Accomplice") (1962) - Sheriff Luke Donaldson
  - (Season 5 Episode 8: "Trail to Ashley Mountain") (1966) - Blanchard
  - (Season 9 Episode 4: "Love, Bullets and Valentines") (1970) - Harv Plimpton (The Men From Shiloh, the rebranded name of The Virginian)
- Gunsmoke (1963–1974) (10 episodes)
  - (Season 9 Episode 10: "Extradition: Part 1") (1963) - Charlie Hacker
  - (Season 9 Episode 11: "Extradition: Part 2") (1963) - Charlie Hacker
  - (Season 13 Episode 6: "A Hat") (1967) - Clint Sorils
  - (Season 13 Episode 23: "The First People") (1968) - Thomas Evans
  - (Season 16 Episode 6: "Snow Train: Part 1") (1970) - Billy
  - (Season 16 Episode 7: "Snow Train: Part 2") (1970) - Billy
  - (Season 17 Episode 2: "Phoenix") (1971) - Jess Hume
  - (Season 18 Episode 10: "Tatum") (1972) - Bodie Tatum
  - (Season 19 Episode 19: "The Iron Blood of Courage") (1974) - Shaw Anderson
  - (Season 20 Episode 5: "Thirty a Month and Found") (1974) - Will Parmalee
- Daniel Boone (1965–1969) (2 episodes)
  - (Season 1 Episode 16: "The First Stone") (1965) - Joshua Craig
  - (Season 6 Episode 4: "The Man") (1969) - Stark
- Branded (1965) (Season 1 Episode 5: "The Bounty") - Matthew Paxton
- The Legend of Jesse James (1965) (Season 1 Episode 6: "Vendetta") - Jake Burnett
- The Iron Horse (1966) (Season 1 Episode 5: "The Pride of the Bottom of the Barrel") - Sergeant Stoddard
- Ironside (1967–1973) (2 episodes)
  - (Season 1 Episode 1: "Message from Beyond") (1967) - Al Hayes
  - (Season 7 Episode 8: "Downhill All the Way Parker") (1973) - Parker
- Dragnet 1966 (1969) (TV movie) - Captain Hugh Brown
- Here Come the Brides (1970) (Season 2 Episode 20: "Two Worlds") - Jacob Marsh
- Mannix (1971) (Season 5 Episode 12: "Murder Times Three") - Dan Brockway
- Longstreet (1971) (Season 1 Episode 9: "Wednesday's Child") - Fred Decker
- Nichols (1971) (Season 1 Episode 6: "Deer Crossing") - Durand
- Alias Smith and Jones (1972) (Season 2 Episode 18: "The Men That Corrupted Hadleyburg") - Phillips
- Spencer's Pilots (1976) (11 episodes) - Spencer Parish
- The Rhinemann Exchange (1977) (TV miniseries) (Season 1 Episode 1) - Colonel Barton
- The Incredible Hulk (1978) (Season 2 Episode 4: "Rainbow's End") - Jimmy Kelly
- Lassie: The New Beginning (1978) (TV movie) - Sheriff Marsh
- The Hardy Boys/Nancy Drew Mysteries (1978) (Season 2 Episode 14: "Oh Say Can You Sing") - Sergeant Feinauer
- The Eddie Capra Mysteries (1978) (Season 1 Episode 6: "How Do I Kill Thee?") - Drew Collins
- Dallas (1979) Season 2 Episode 14: "Home Again" - Garrison Ewing
- Charlie's Angels (1979) (Season 4 Episode 12: "Cruising Angels") - James Webner
- Fantasy Island (1979) (Season 3 Episode 3: "Tattoo: the Love God/Magnolia Blossoms") - Confederate asking for money
- Casino (TV movie) (1980) - Captain K.L. Fitzgerald
- Vega$ (1981) (Season 3 Episode 11: "Murder by Mirrors") - Marcus Hinton
- Hart to Hart (1981) (Season 2 Episode 12: "Murder in the Saddle") - Ray Dudley
- M*A*S*H (1982) (Season 10 Episode 12: "Blood and Guts") - Clayton Kibbee
- Simon & Simon (1983–1987) (3 episodes)
  - (Season 3 Episode 10: "Betty Grable Flies Again") (1983) - Arch McBride
  - (Season 5 Episode 23: "The Last Harangue") (1986) - Freight Yard Supervisor
  - (Season 6 Episode 13: "Deep Water Death") (1987) - Captain Kyle Bates
- Murder, She Wrote (1984–1986) (2 episodes)
  - (Season 1 Episode 7: "We're Off to Kill the Wizard") (1984) - Nils Highlander
  - (Season 2 Episode 13: "Trial by Error") (1986) - Otto Fry
- The A-Team (1985) (Season 3 Episode 22: "Bounty") - Darrow
- Scarecrow and Mrs. King (1987) (Season 4 Episode 17: "Mission of Gold") - Gus Weinstein
