= Come Midnight Monday =

- Based on: Come Midnight Monday by David Burke
- Written by: Roger Dann
- Directed by: Mark Callan
- Starring: Stephen Comey; Tim Blake; Sally Boyden; Jacqui Gordon; Tommy Dysart
- Composer: Kevin Hocking
- Country of origin: Australia
- Original language: English
- No. of episodes: 7

Production
- Producer: David Zweck
- Running time: 30 mins

Original release
- Network: ABC
- Release: 4 March – 15 April 1982

Come Midnight Monday is a 1982 Australian children's TV series. It consisted of seven 30 minute episodes first broadcast in 1982.

== Plot summary ==
Four teenagers fight plans to close the Winnawadgery railway, scrap its veteran steam engine Wombat and build a highway in its place. Their campaign runs into opposition from a prominent local businessman. They enlist the help of retired engine driver Angus McPhee.

== Production ==
The script was written by regular Bellbird writer Roger Dann, adapted from the children's novel by David Burke OAM. It was filmed mainly on location at Cockatoo in Victoria. The train sequences were filmed on the Puffing Billy Railway with NA class locomotive 12A portraying the Wombat.

== Cast ==
- Stephen Comey as Tim Forsyth
- Tim Blake as Squeak Hoolihan
- Sally Boyden as Beverley 'Biff' Hoolihan
- Jacqui Gordon as Jenny 'Bugsy' Hoolihan
- Tommy Dysart as Angus McPhee
- Peter Cummins as Albert Spack
- Cliff Ellen as Clifford
- Peter Hosking as Frank Harrison

== Crew ==
- Producer: David Zweck
- Director: Mark Callan
- Scriptwriter: Roger Dunn
- Sound recordist: John Beanland
- Production Designer: Paul Cleveland, Alwyn Harbott
- Music: Kevin Hocking
