= Lassie: The New Beginning =

- Genre: Drama
- Created by: Eric Knight
- Based on: Lassie Come-Home
- Screenplay by: Jack Miller
- Story by: Jack Miller; Earl Hamner Jr.
- Directed by: Don Chaffey
- Starring: John Reilly
- Theme music composer: Jerrold Immel
- Country of origin: United States
- Original language: English
- No. of episodes: 1

Production
- Executive producer: Tom McDermott
- Producers: Jack Miller; William Beaudine
- Production location: Sonoma County, California
- Cinematography: Charles F. Wheeler
- Editor: Samuel E. Beetley
- Running time: 87 minutes
- Production company: Wrather Productions

Original release
- Network: ABC
- Release: September 17, 1978

Lassie: The New Beginning was a 1978 television film featuring the famous dog Lassie.

== Plot ==
The Stratton family, grandmother Ada, her teenage granddaughter Sam and younger grandson Chip, travel from Aztec, Arizona to live with their Uncle Stuart in Lake Pines, California. However, once there Ada dies in a sudden heart attack. Unable to contact Uncle Stuart, who is fishing in the mountains, the children are sent to a foster family, the Waldups, and their dog, Lassie is sent to the pound. However, Lassie manages to escape from the pound and find her way to her owners who runaway attempting to find Stuart themselves. After many adventures in the California wilderness the family is reunited and Stuart agrees to keep both Lassie and the kids.

== Cast ==
- John Reilly - Stuart Stratton
- Jeanette Nolan - Ada Stratton
- Sally Boyden - Sam Stratton
- Shane Sinutko - Chip Stratton
- David Wayne - Amos Rheams
- Gene Evans - Sheriff Marsh
- Lee Bryant - Kathy McKendrick
- Jeff Harlan - Buzz McKendrick
- John McIntire - Dr. Spreckles
- Jim Antonio - Mr. Waldrup
- Gwen Van Dam - Mrs. Waldrup
- Charles Tyner - Asa Bluel
- Lucille Benson - Juno
- Logan Ramsey - Flannagan
