= Because He's My Friend =

- VHS case
- Written by: Peter Schreck
- Story by: Pamela Stone
- Directed by: Ralph Nelson
- Starring: Keir Dullea; Karen Black; Jack Thompson; Tom Oliver; Ray Meagher; Warwick Poulsen
- Music by: Peter Jones
- Country of origin: Australia
- Original language: English

Production
- Producer: Geoffrey Daniels
- Cinematography: Peter Hendry
- Editor: Richard Francis-Bruce
- Running time: 90 minutes
- Production company: Transatlantic Enterprises

Original release
- Release: 1978

Because He's My Friend, also known as Love Under Pressure, is a 1978 Australian TV movie about a married couple and their mentally disabled son. It was one of six telemovies made in Australia as co-productions between ABC and Transatlantic Enterprises.

== Plot ==
Eric, a Canadian naval officer serving with the Royal Navy is transferred to Australia for a submarine training exercise. He moves to Sydney with his wife Anne and their 12-year-old mentally disabled son Petey.

Anne takes her son to a special school, who encourage her to take a firmer line with her son. This results in a clash with Eric.

== Cast ==
- Karen Black as Anne
- Keir Dullea as Eric
- Jack Thompson as Geoff
- Tom Oliver as Ian
- Barbara Stephens as Meg
- June Salter as Val
- Warwick Poulsen as Petey
- Michael Long as Matt

== Production ==
Ralph Nelson signed to direct in July.

Shooting took place in Sydney starting August 15 through to October 1977 over six weeks. Scenes were shot at Karonga House Special School in Epping in August. Permission had been obtained from the Subnormal Children's Welfare Association. The association was happy to co-operate because the activity of the film unit would be good therapy for children.

Jack Thompson filmed his scenes while on a break shooting his role in The Chant of Jimmie Blacksmith. It was one of many films he made around this time where he supported American stars.

== Reception ==
The critic from the Sydney Morning Herald said the character of the son was "winning and repulsive at the same time."

Another reviewer for the same paper called it " warm, touching and utterly honest... a darned good movie, and its climax will not disappoint you."

Warwick Poulsen's performance earned him a Logie for Best Performance by a Juvenile.
