= Stephen Comey =

Australian actor (born 1963)

- Born: 1963 (age 62–63); London, England, United Kingdom
- Citizenship: Australia
- Occupation: Actor
- Known for: Sons and Daughters as Kevin Palmer
- Awards: Logie Award for Most Popular New Talent (1983)

Stephen Comey (born 1963) is an English-born Australian actor, known for his role as Kevin Palmer in the television soap opera Sons and Daughters. Comey also played the leading role of Tim Forsyth in the children's TV series Come Midnight Monday, and had guest roles in Cop Shop, The Flying Doctors and Home and Away.

== Biography ==
Comey was born in London, England to an Australian mother and Irish father. He is the middle child of five. The family moved to Australia in 1969 when Comey was five years old. Comey attended Heatherhill Secondary College in Melbourne.

Comey began acting after appearing in the play Montague, The Mouse That Sailed With Caption Cook aged seven. He took drama classes at school and attended lesson at the National Theatre, Melbourne. He was soon cast in the leading role of Tim Forsyth in the children's TV series Come Midnight Monday. This was followed by a guest appearance as a juvenile drug addict in the Crawford Productions drama Cop Shop both of which went to air in 1982. After missing fifteen weeks of school, Comey decided to leave in October 1981 shortly before his HSC exam to pursue his acting career.

He is perhaps best known for playing teenager Kevin Palmer in the television soap opera Sons and Daughters from its debut in 1981 until 1984. Comey enjoyed the role, saying "He's changing all the time and I've been able to do some things I've never done before—like playing the drums." He described his character as naïve and good at almost every sport, but he cannot communicate well with his father. Kevin marries his childhood sweetheart Lynn (Antonia Murphy) after she becomes pregnant, in a storyline that Comey felt reflected society at the time. For his portrayal of Kevin, Comey won the 1983 Logie Award for Most Popular New Talent. During his time in Sons and Daughters, Comey shared a house in the North Shore with co-star Ian Rawlings (Wayne Hamilton).

In July 1983, a reporter for TV Week confirmed that Comey would be leaving Sons and Daughters after a mutual decision between himself and the producers. Comey asked for more action for his character, as he felt Kevin was becoming stale, but the producers wanted to stick to their original plans for him. Comey filmed his final scenes in November and they aired the following year in April. After Sons and Daughters, Comey appeared in a 1987 episode of The Flying Doctors, followed by Kennedy Miller's Vietnam, Seven's Hey Dad, and soap opera Home and Away.

In 1989, Comey was cast in Harry Michaels's television soap opera Somerset Street as a university student. The first episode of the serial was filmed in Balmain and funded by Michaels.

His stage credits include the Sydney Theatre Company's Six Characters in Search of an Author, Crossroads Theatre's Authority, and the Pavilion Theatre's The Lion in Winter for the Castle Hill Players.

Comey quit acting and became an event manager. He was the senior exhibition manager for the Australian Water Association (AWA). He is also a founding member of Radio Active Live, a bespoke theatre company who perform radio plays on stage in Sydney's Hills District.
