= Brian Blain =

Australian actor (1936–1994)

- Born: Brian Donald Blain; 13 September 1936; Windsor, Queensland, Australia
- Died: 2 July 1994 (aged 57); Leichhardt, New South Wales, Australia
- Occupation: Actor
- Years active: 1957−1992

Brian Donald Blain (13 September 1936 – 2 July 1994) was an Australian actor, best known for his roles in numerous TV series and films starting from the early 1970s.

== Career ==
Blain is best remembered for his role in the Seven Network soap opera Sons and Daughters from 1982 to 1987 as Gordon Hamilton and his role as Captain Jacob Hilliard in the film sequel Return to the Blue Lagoon (1991). In that same year, he also starred opposite Anne Haddy playing Michael Daniels, a love interest of her character Helen Daniels in the Network Ten soap opera Neighbours. Only a few years previously Haddy had played his housekeeper Rosie in Sons and Daughters.

Blain, apart from television and film roles, also worked in theatre, notably The National Theatre in Perth, Western Australia and the Queensland Theatre Company

Blain was injured in a motorcycle accident in 1990. He died from a heart attack in July 1994, at the age of 57.

== Filmography ==
=== Film ===
Title	Year	Role	Type
1972	Private Collection	Joseph Tibbsworth	Feature film
1976	Arena		TV movie
1978	The Tichborne Affair	Hopkins	TV movie
1978	Newsfront	Fred	Feature film
1980	Touch and Go		Feature film
1980	Coralie Landsdowne Says No	Peter	TV movie
1981	Alison's Birthday	Uncle Patrick	Feature film
1982	Starstruck	Brewery Executive	TV movie
1982	Deadline	Dr. Durant	TV movie
1991	Return to the Blue Lagoon	Captain Jacob Hilliard	Feature film
1992	The Girl Who Came Late (aka Daydream Believer)	Headmaster	Feature film
1992	The Time Game	Mr. Crocker	TV movie

=== Television ===
Title	Year	Role	Type
1972	Division 4	Mario Russo	TV series
1974	Silent Number	Allan	TV series
1975	Ben Hall	Sir Frederick Pottinger	TV miniseries
1976	King's Men		TV series
1976	The Bluestone Boys	Claude	TV series
1976	Power Without Glory	Peter Wells	TV miniseries
1977	Bluey	Spencer	TV series
1977	Young Ramsay	Dunn	TV series
1978	Chopper Squad	1st Criminal	TV series
1981	Holiday Island	Jack Fitzsimmons	TV series
1981	Cop Shop	Bob Giddons / Fred Branford	TV series
1981	Sporting Chance	Walker	TV series
1982-87	Sons and Daughters	Gordon Hamilton	TV series
1989	E Street	Dr. Pearce	TV series
1990	A Country Practice	Cec Kennedy	TV series
1990-91	Rafferty's Rules	Bob Doherty	TV series
1991	Neighbours	Michael Daniels	TV series
1992	G.P.	Alan Day	TV series
