= Taurus Rising =

Television series

- Genre: Soap opera Drama
- Created by: Reg Watson
- Country of origin: Australia
- Original language: English
- No. of seasons: 1
- No. of episodes: 21

Production
- Producer: Philip East
- Production company: Reg Grundy Organisation

Original release
- Network: Nine Network
- Release: 27 July – 17 December 1982

Taurus Rising is an Australian soap opera produced by the Reg Grundy Organisation for the Nine Network in 1982. Originally intended by the network to be a replacement for The Sullivans, the series was one of a number of attempts to provide an Australian alternative to the glossy American supersoaps Dallas and Dynasty and featured two wealthy Sydney-based feuding families, the Brents and the Drysdales. To this end, it represented something of a stylistic departure for Grundy's. Unlike most other Australian soap operas which were recorded on videotape, Taurus Rising was shot entirely on film. The series began at 8.30pm time-slot in a two hour movie pilot and continued for a couple of weeks on Tuesday nights. Due to a decline in ratings it was delegated to Friday nights at 10pm by the time of the finale during 1982. Taurus Rising has never screened on Nine Network since the original screening.

Taurus Rising proved to be an expensive failure after it failed to win an audience and was cancelled after 21 episodes. The series did later prove popular in international markets and was subsequently sold to American cable television, marketed as a 21-part "miniseries".

== Production ==
The project originated in 1979 at Channel Nine by Michael Pate and Tony Morphett. It was originally envisioned as a short quality series about two rival family business dynasties. Morphett wrote the early drafts. Over 18 months of development the series evolved and was outsourced to Grundy Productions. Grundys made a pilot which was viewed by Channel 9 in January 1982.

It cost $2 million to make.

== Cast ==
Taurus Rising focuses on the rival Brent and Drysdale families.

The Brents

- Annette Andre as Jennifer Brent: Long-lost daughter of Harry, mother of Mike.
- Andrew Clarke as Mike Brent: Son of Jennifer and Ben.
- Gordon Glenwright as Harry Brent: Patriarch of the Brent family.

The Drysdales

- Georgie Sterling as Isabella Drysdale: Matriarch of the Drysdale family, who was once engaged to Harry Brent.
- Alan Cassell as Ben Drysdale: Son of Isabella, married to Faith, head of the Drysdale construction business.
- Betty Lucas as Faith Drysdale: Wife of Ben.
- Andrew Sharp as Keith Drysdale
- Damon Herriman as Phil Drysdale: Son of Ben and Faith.
- Marina Finlay as Elizabeth Drysdale

Others

- Linda Newton as Alice Blake: Daughter of Bert, teacher and nanny to Phil.
- Maurie Fields as Bert: Father of Alice, Drysdale construction foreman
- Michael Long as Sam Farrer: Son of Marie, works for Ben.
- Diane Craig as Libby Hilton: Journalist at the Sydney Observer, having an affair with Ben.
- Vic Hawkins as Malcolm Adams
- Jessica Noad as Marie: Mother of Sam, housekeeper for the Drysdale family.

== Reception ==
Richard Coleman of The Sydney Morning Herald placed Taurus Rising at the top of his worst of 1982 list, along with the similar Winner Take All miniseries on ABC. Coleman quipped that "its untimely downfall a few weeks later was mourned only by a few accountants in Willoughby." He thought the "gloomy times, or the all too familiar feel of the stories" contributed to both shows' poor ratings and demise.

Robert Fidgeon of the Herald Sun named Taurus Rising as one of "Australia's All-time Top 50 TV Turkeys" in 2002. He stated "Super-expensive Dallas-type drama series about the rivalry between two building-industry families. Diane Craig, Alan Cassell (SeaChange) and Maurie Fields headed a good cast." He also likened it to American soap Dynasty and said it was "boasting more Mercs, BMWs, Rollers and corporate Lear jets than you could poke a stick at".

In 2020, Fidgeon's colleague Fiona Byrne included Taurus Rising in her feature about "long forgotten Australian TV dramas that made viewers switch off." She described the show as "an ambitious, expensive but unsuccessful attempt by Channel 9 to create a super soap for Australia like the American hit Dynasty." Byrne went onto write "The name of the show, which caused no end of confusion with many viewers thinking it was a series with zodiac links, referred to the Taurus building that the families were trying to build. The show launched to lower than expected ratings in July 1982 and it was all downhill from there. Its name and ratings made references such as 'Taurus flopping' irresistible."
