= No Room to Run =

- Directed by: Robert Michael Lewis
- Written by: George Kirgo
- Produced by: Charles Russell
- Starring: Richard Benjamin; Paula Prentiss; Roger Ward; Noel Ferrier; Ray Barrett
- Production company: ABC-Transatlantic Enterprises
- Distributed by: ABC
- Release date: 18 May 1977 (Australia)
- Running time: 100 mins
- Countries: Australia; US
- Language: English

No Room to Run is a 1977 Australian television film about an American businessman who kills a man in Sydney. The lead actors, writer, producer and director were all American. It stars real-life husband and wife Richard Benjamin and Paula Prentiss.

It was the first in a series of six TV movies made as co productions between the ABC and Los Angeles–based Transatlantic Enterprises.

== Plot ==
Nick Loomis is vice-president in charge of public relations with an international corporation. He travels to Australia to promote the American Youth Orchestra who are performing at the Sydney Opera House. His boss, Garth Kingswood plans to follow within a few days.

Loomis is met at the airport by his company's Sydney representative, Ralph Fleming. Fleming tells him about the mysterious death of employee Jack Deakin.

Loomis finds himself on the run for murder.

== Cast ==
- Richard Benjamin as Nick Loomis
- Paula Prentiss as Terry McKenna
- Barry Sullivan as Garth Kingwood
- Ray Barrett as Jack Deakin
- Anne Haddy as Julie Deakin

== Transatlantic Enterprises ==
The ABC's Controller of Television, John Cameron, was interested in getting the ABC involved in international co-productions, to maximise the ABC's drama budget and to increase the chance of overseas sales. Through Global Television, the ABC's distribution in London, they got in contact with 20th Century Fox who agreed to handle US sales for the ABC-BBC show Ben Hall. Fox's representative, Robert Kline, suggested remaking Adventures in Paradise on location and in colour but Cameron felt the islands were too far from Australia. Cameron suggested a series set in the Gulf of Carpentaria and Klein agreed.

Klein ended up going into business on his own as Transatlantic Enterprises, and it was that company that went into partnership with the ABC. They were going to do a feature-length pilot, then according to Cameron "it seemed that it was going to be easier to get money for a larger package than for one or two singles."

They decided to make a series of TV movies instead. Originally it was six, which then grew to 18 over three years. The films were to have budgets of $1.5 to 2 million and would be screened on ABC television with the option of a theatrical release elsewhere.

Robert Kline, head of Trans Atlantic, said "basically we'll be dealing with creative dimensions that justify American leads being in Australia... Sydney is comparable to Southern California. In those cases where we don't develop a story from scratch, we're finding that scripts calling from California settings can be adapted to Australia.

John Cameron said "Nobody ought to believe that this is going to result in the finest flower of television drama. It will be high action, adventure-orientated, the sort of material that is staple diet for prime-time viewing all over the world. Not too banal or stupid, but nonetheless lightweight for relaxed viewing.”

The Australian Writers Guild was placated with the assurance that half the scripts would be written by Australians at the same rate as American writers. The Producers and Directors Guild were assured that Australians would be hired to assist and observe American directors on the initial productions and then be used to direct later ones. Actors Equity allowed two imported actors per film. The scripts were supervised by James Davern, the ABC's head of drama, and Gene Levitt, an American writer-producer-director.

== Production ==
=== Development ===
The first of the movies was No Room to Run which was originally called Hunted.

The head of TransAtlantic wanted Rita Lakin to write a pilot called The Last Bride of Salem. She agreed provided he give her husband, Robert Michael Lewis, the job of directing one of the Australian films.

The stars were Richard Benjamin and Paula Prentiss, who were married in real life. They accepted the parts because it gave them a chance to visit Sydney, and because the film was a thriller, and both were better known for comedy . "I haven't played a serious role like this before, I'm always comedy oriented," said Prentiss.

They had acted together in the TV show He and She and on stage in The Norman Conquests, but had never previously appeared in a film together where they shared screen time (they were both in Catch 22 but did not appear in the same scenes).

Benjamin and Prentiss arrived in Sydney on September 8 and filming started September 14.

=== Filming ===
Lewis says Lakin came to Australia to work on the script with George Kirgo and Joe Gantman "but we never fundamentally solved the problems. I mean, it was okay but it wasn't breathtaking."

Filming took place in and around Sydney Harbour and the Rocks. Prentiss and Benjamin enjoyed the shoot in part because they so rarely acted together on film.

Lewis says "the film industry was very primitive" in Australia - he was happy with the cinematographer and camera operator but felt the grips, gaffers and electricians were too inexperienced and the stuntmen were "too careless" and almost caused someone to be injured. "The whole set up was poor," says Lewis.

During filming Lewis fell in love with the woman who was Paula Prentiss' stand in and married her.

Noel Ferrier said "my own estimation of my performance was dreadful... in fairness, it has to be said the whole film was on a par with my contribution in it." He says Prentiss and Benjamin were "charming" but "were both taking fluid pills to preserve their match like slenderness and consequently were forever rushing to the lavatory."

== Reception ==
The Sydney Morning Herald TV critic wrote that the film had a "confused plot, badly written script, some appalling miscasting—they all help to dispel the current feeling that maybe, at last Australian films and television have come of age. No Room To Run could have been thrown together 20 years ago, that's how amateurish it is."

The Australian Woman's Weekly wrote "the script... is below average and the production... worse."

Filmink called it a "thriller that seems uncertain of its tone – the bones are light hearted Hitchcock, but it seems infused with ‘70s seriousness."

Lewis said "the Australian reviews were awful. We re-adjusted Sydney in terms of where things were and literal Australian reviewers couldn't stand that."

== Awards ==
Brian May won a Penguin Award for Best Original Music for the film.

== Other Transatlantic films ==
Transatlantic wound up making six telemovies in Australia, not 18 as originally announced. The other ones produced were:

- Barnaby and Me
- Because He's My Friend
- Puzzle
- She'll Be Sweet
- Shimmering Light
