= List of Australian films of 1974 =

== 1974 ==
Title	Director	Cast	Genre	Notes
27A				IMDb, AFI winner for Best Film
Alvin Purple Rides Again	David Bilcock, Robin Copping	Graeme Blundell, Alan Finney, Gus Mercurio, Noel Ferrier, Chantal Contouri, Frank Thring, Abigail, Penne Hackforth-Jones, Jon Finlayson, Candy Raymond, Briony Behets, Arna-Maria Winchester, Kris McQuade	Comedy	IMDb
Australia After Dark	John D. Lamond		Documentary	IMDb
Barry McKenzie Holds His Own	Bruce Beresford	Barry Crocker, Barry Humphries, Donald Pleasence, Dick Bentley, Chantal Contouri, Ed Devereaux, Tommy Trinder, Roy Kinnear, Clive James	Comedy	IMDb
Between Wars	Michael Thornhill	Corin Redgrave, Judy Morris, Peter Cummins, Gunter Meisner, Arthur Dignam, Patricia Leehy, Melissa Jaffer, Martin Vaughan	Drama / History / War	IMDb
By Hook Or By Crook	Diana Nettlefold	Stuart Nettlefold, Sam Nettlefold, Edith Tinning, Ethel Trethewey, Hugh Nolan, Joan von Bibra	Short film	
The Cars That Ate Paris	Peter Weir	John Meillon, Terry Camilleri, Kevin Miles, Max Gillies, Max Phipps, Bruce Spence, Melissa Jaffer, Peter Armstrong, Chris Haywood	Comedy / Horror Feature film	IMDb
Children of the Moon	Bob Weis		feature film	
Essington	Julian Pringle	Michael Craig, John Hargreaves, Wendy Hughes, Cornelia Frances, Hugh Keays-Byrne, Sandra McGregor, Chris Haywood, Melissa Jaffer, Justine Saunders, Ralph Cotterill, Drew Forsythe, Jacqueline Kott, Wynn Roberts	Drama TV film	
Film for Discussion	Martha Ansara, Sydney Women's Film Group	Jeni Thornley	Documentary / Drama	IMDb
A Handful of Dust				IMDb
The Hotline		Fred "Cul" Cullen, Max Cullen, John Ewart, Muriel Hopkins, Tony Jowett, Lynda Keane, Vince Martin, Anna Volska	Drama TV film	
India Our Asian Neighbours				IMDb
Lockhart Festival				IMDb
Matchless				IMDb
Moving On				IMDb
Mr Symbol Man				IMDb
Number 96	Peter Bernardos	Johnny Lockwood, Phillipa Baker, Tom Oliver, Lynn Rainbow, Alister Smart, Rebecca Gilling, Gordon McDougall, Sheila Kennelly, Elaine Lee, Joe Hasham, John Orcsik, Pat McDonald, Ron Shand, Bunney Brooke	Comedy Feature film	IMDb
Petersen	Tim Burstall	Jack Thompson, Jacki Weaver, Wendy Hughes, Arthur Dignam, Helen Morse, Charles Tingwell, Belinda Giblin, David Phillips, George Mallaby, John Ewart, Tim Robertson, John Orcsik	Drama Feature film	IMDb
Rolling Home	Paul Witzig		feature film	
A Steam Train Passes	David Haythornwaite	Chris O'Sullivan, Harold Fowler	Short documentary	IMDb
Stone	Sandy Harbutt	Ken Shorter, Sandy Harbutt, Hugh Keays-Byrne, Bill Hunter, Helen Morse, Rebecca Gilling, Bill Hunter, Roger Ward, Bindi Williams, Lex Mitchell, Garry McDonald, Ros Speirs, Vincent Gil, Slim de Grey, Drew Forsythe	Crime / Action Feature film	IMDb
Stopover		Charles Tingwell, Tony Bonner, Jon English, Kate Sheil, Carla Hoogeveen, Cheryl Rixon	Drama / Thriller TV film	Based on Homicide TV series (1964–1977)
Sweet Feed				IMDb
The Players				IMDb
The Spiral Bureau		Peter Sumner, Wendy Hughes, John Derum, John Ewart, Vincent Ball, Kevin Miles, Jack Fegan	TV film	IMDb aka Eye of the Spiral
Three Old Friends	Tim Burstall	Graeme Blundell, Bruce Spence, Alan Finney	Short film	IMDb, Available DVD "Stork"
Tidikawa and Friends	Jef Doring, Su Doring		Documentary	IMDb
Tully	James Gatward	Anthony Valentine, Kevin Miles, Henri Szeps, John Stanton, Jack Thompson, Noeline Brown, Barbara Nielsen, Tony Barry, Les Foxcroft, Bruno Lawrence	ABC TV film / TV Pilot British-Australian co-production originally aired as Armchair Cinema series presentation in November 1975.	
The Twelve Gifts		Alistair Duncan, Barbara Frawley, Ron Haddrick, Brenda Senders		IMDB
The Shrine of Ultimate Bliss		Angela Mao, George Lazenby, Betty Ting, Hwang In-shik, Joji Takagi, Sammo Hung		IMDb
Wokabout Bilong Tonten	Oliver Howes		feature film	
Yackety Yack or Yaketty Yak (TFYB)	Dave Jones	Dave Jones, John Flaus, Peter Carmody, Peggy Cole, John Cleary, Jerzy Toeplitz, Doug White, Rod Nicholls, Andy Miller	Comedy	IMDb

== See also ==
- 1974 in Australia
- 1974 in Australian television
