= George Mallaby (actor) =

British-Australian actor and scriptwriter

- Born: George Frederick Mallaby; 4 November 1939; Hartlepool, England
- Died: 12 July 2004 (aged 64)
- Occupations: Actor; scriptwriter; signwriter
- Spouse(s): Ruth Bass (1968–1975, divorced); Lenice Mallaby (1975–2004, his death)
- Children: 3
- Awards: Logie Award for Best Actor

George Frederick Mallaby (4 November 1939 – 12 July 2004) was an English-born actor and screenwriter, best known for his roles in television in Australia, primarily in series playing tough cops including roles in Homicide, The Box and Cop Shop and in his latter career in his native England.

== Personal life ==
Mallaby was born in Hartlepool, United Kingdom, and moved to Australia with his parents when he was 16. His father was a policeman. Mallaby's first jobs were signwriting and crayfishing.

He was married to Ruth Bass in 1968 and they divorced in 1975.

Mallaby started one of Australia's first hazelnut farms, something he saw as "his basic protection against the insecurity of show business"

He suffered a stroke in 1994, and subsequently used a wheelchair. He died of congestive heart failure in 2004. He was survived by his widow Lenice, sons Guy and Luke, and daughter Kirsti from his first marriage.

== Career ==
Mallaby made his acting debut at the Adelaide Festival of Arts, but soon obtained TV roles in Melbourne.

He played Detective Peter Barnes in the crime series Homicide in episodes 131 to 395 from 1967 to 1973, representing more than half the series run. Along with Alwyn Kurts, Leonard Teale and Norman Yemm, Mallaby was part of what is often considered "the consummate Homicide cast". He also wrote scripts for the series, some under his first wife's name.

After Homicide he was an original cast member of The Box in the lead role of television executive Paul Donovan, staying in the role from 1974 until 1975. He was later an original cast member of Cop Shop as head of a suburban police station's Criminal Investigation Branch, Detective Senior Sergeant Glenn Taylor. He continued in that role from the program's debut in November 1977 until 1979. In 1980 he appeared in Prisoner for several months as social worker Paul Reid. He also wrote scripts for Prisoner and Matlock Police. He said of scriptwriting that "writing requires a mood. It might be called a creative mood, I suppose. Unfortunately for those close to me, the mood often seems to come around 4 am. I get a spasm of creativity and just have to jump out of bed and start writing".

Mallaby also acted in mini-series including Power Without Glory, Sword of Honour and All the Way. He acted in feature films such as Tim Burstall's Eliza Fraser (1976), Petersen, and End Play.

During the late 1970s he returned to Britain. There he made appearances in various television series including Secret Army, Survivors and The Professionals, and appeared as a submarine crew member in the James Bond film The Spy Who Loved Me (1977).

His last regular role was as Colonel Mustard in Cluedo, the game show-comedy-mystery series.

== Awards ==
- Won the Best Actor Logie award for role in The Box in 1975

== Filmography ==
=== Film ===
Year	Title	Role	Notes
1974	Petersen	Executive	
1975	The Box	Paul Donovan	Based on the TV series of the same name
1976	End Play	Robert Gifford	
1976	Eliza Fraser	Lt. Otter	
1977	The Spy Who Loved Me	U.S.S. Wayne Crewman	
1985	Best Enemies	Mike O'Brien	

=== Television ===
Year	Title	Role	Notes
1965–1967	Wednesday Theatre	Vic	Season 1, episode 38 – "Dark Corridor"
1965–1967	Wednesday Theatre	(unknown role)	Season 3, episode 14 – "Course for Collision"
1966–1967	Australian Playhouse	(unknown role)	Season 1, episode 23
1966–1967	Australian Playhouse	(unknown role)	Season 1, episode 30
1966–1967	Australian Playhouse	Lt. Marshall	Season 2, episode 5
1966–1973	Homicide	Alan	Season 3, episode 41
1966–1973	Homicide	Dick Abbott	Season 3, episode 44
1966–1973	Homicide	Don Brady	Season 4, episode 30
1966–1973	Homicide	Sen. Det. Peter Barnes	Seasons 4–10 (main role, 265 episodes)
1967	Bellbird	Jerry Cochran	Unknown episode(s)
1967	Hunter	Police Constable	Season 1, episode 1
1967	Hunter	Kelly	Season 1, episodes 8 & 9
1974–1975	The Box	Paul Donovan	Seasons 1–2 (main role, 194 episodes)
1974	And the Big Men Fly	Jack Drew	Season 1 (main role, 6 episodes)
1976	Tandarra	Jacob McGowan	Season 1, episode 1
1976	Power Without Glory	Barney Robinson	Miniseries (12 episodes)
1977	Survivors	Mason	Season 3, episode 10
1977	Secret Army	Guard	Season 1, episode 2
1977	1990	Carr	Season 1, episode 4
1977–1979, 1981	Cop Shop	Det. Sgt. Glen Taylor	Seasons 1–2, 4 (main role, 159 episodes)
1978	The Professionals	Driver	Season 1, episode 11
1978	Skyways	District Attorney	2 episodes (unknown season)
1979	Burn the Butterflies	(unknown role)	TV movie
1979	Lawson's Mates	Narrator/Jack Henright	Season 1, episodes 1 & 5
1980	Prisoner	Paul Reid	Season 2 (main role, 43 episodes)
1981	Holiday Island	McLeod	Season 1, episodes 28 & 41
1981	Cornflakes for Tea	Magistrate	Season 1 (6 episodes)
1982	The Highest Honor	Lt. Cmdr. Don Davidson	TV movie
1983	Outbreak of Hostilities	Vince Benton	TV movie
1983, 1990	A Country Practice	Perry Nolan	Season 3, episodes 29, 30, 31 & 32
1983, 1990	A Country Practice	Gilbert Tyler	Season 10, episodes 67 & 68
1986	Sword of Honour	Colonel Curtis	Miniseries (2 episodes)
1988	All the Way	George Cutler	Season 1 (3 episodes)
1989	The Power, The Passion	Justin Wright	Unknown episode(s)
1991	Ratbag Hero	Benson	Miniseries
1991	The Flying Doctor	Malcolm Harrison	Season 9, episode 17
1991	Chances	Richard Parsons	Season 1, episodes 8 & 9
1991	Kelly	Insp. Webber	Season 1 (recurring, 5 episodes)
1992	Cluedo	Colonel Mustard	Seasons 1–2 (main role, 21 episodes)
1994	Time Trax	Ralph	Season 2, episode 4
1994	Neighbours	Tom Weaver	Season 10 (recurring, 8 episodes)

=== Writing credits ===
Year	Title	Notes
1968, 1971, 1974	Homicide	Seasons 5, 8 & 11 (5 episodes)
1971–73	Matlock Police	Season 1–3 (3 episodes)
1972	Division 4	Season 4 (1 episode)
1977, 1979, 1981	Cop Shop	Seasons 1, 2 & 4 (4 episodes)
1980–81	Prisoner	Seasons 2–3 (12 episodes)
