= Anne Scott-Pendlebury =

Australian actress

- Born: 21 August 1946 (age 80); Australia
- Education: Strathcona Girls Grammar (1964)
- Occupation: Actress
- Known for: Neighbours as Hilary Robinson
- Parent(s): L. Scott Pendlebury, Nornie Gude
- Family: Andrew Pendlebury (brother)

Anne Scott-Pendlebury (born 21 August 1946), also known as Anne Pendlebury, is an Australian television, film and theatre actress. She played the role of Hilary Robinson in the soap opera Neighbours.

== Early life ==
Scott-Pendlebury was born to artists L. Scott Pendlebury and Eleanor "Nornie" Gude.

She attended Strathcona Girls Grammar in Melbourne, where she studied English, Art, Greek History and Music and she appeared in the annual school play. She graduated in 1964.

She began in professional theatre at the age of 19, with Melbourne Theatre Company, undertaking her formal training with them. She also studied piano, singing, dance and speech with private tutors.

== Career ==
=== Television ===
Scott-Pendlebury appeared in many Melbourne television productions throughout the 1970s and 1980s. She began working with Crawford Productions whilst still at Art School in 1967, beginning with the first of many guest appearances in Homicide, which she continued through to 1975.

From 1970, she played the regular role of Cathy on the drama series Bellbird, for 143 episodes. In 1975, she appeared as Annie in the bushranger miniseries Cash and Company, earning her a nomination for Best Supporting Actress at the 1976 Sammy Awards. She reprised the role again for an episode of the miniseries Tandarra in 1976. That same year, she had a recurring role as a maid in the miniseries Power Without Glory.

In 1979, she starred alongside Harold Hopkins in the ABC-TV drama series, Twenty Good Years as one of the two main characters, Anne Fielding.

Scott-Pendlebury joined the Neighbours cast as Hilary Robinson in 1987. Her agent sent her for the initial small role of Hilary (for which she did not have to audition), who was written in as the cousin of Jim Robinson (played by Alan Dale), during the episode of his sons marriage to Charlene (Kylie Minogue). The producers later brought Hilary on board as a permanent character. She has reprised the role on and off until the show was cancelled in 2025.

=== Theatre ===
Scott-Pendlebury has performed extensively for the stage, including numerous productions with MTC and STCSA.

In 1970, she took the role of Ariel in the Victorian Shakespeare Company production of The Tempest. In 1983, Scott-Pendlebury played Hermione in The Winter's Tale and Natasha in The Three Sisters. The same year, she was part of a select group chosen to take part in a specialised voice workshop on Shakespearean technique and text with Cicely Berry, the vocal coach for the Royal Shakespeare Company in Great Britain.

In 1984, Scott-Pendlebury continued her work with the Melbourne Theatre Company, playing a secretary role in the play Candida, which saw her nominated for a Best Supporting Actress award at the 1985 Green Room Awards. Her role in a production of Blithe Spirit also earned her a Best Supporting Actress award nomination at the 1987 Green Room Awards

She eventually moved into directing for the stage, including a production of The Doctor.

She spent a year writing a stage adaptation of the Ethel Turner book "Seven Little Australians", which met the approval of the Turner Estate.

== Personal life ==
Scott-Pendlebury is the sister of Andrew Pendlebury, a musician. L. Scott Pendlebury's portrait of his two children, "Anne and Drew Pendlebury (actress and musician respectively)", was a finalist for the 1979 Archibald Prize.

Later in her career, Scott-Pendlebury studied a Diploma in Theology from the University of Melbourne. She currently works part time in a gallery and volunteers her services with two organisations in their Archives Departments. She is also a qualified civil celebrant.

== Filmography ==
=== Film ===
Year	Title	Role	Notes
1973	Alvin Purple	Woman with Pin	Feature film
1974	Petersen	Peggy	Feature film
1977	Raw Deal	Dick's girl	Feature film
1987	The Lighthorsemen	Sister	Feature film
2009	The Loved Ones	Bright Eyes	Feature film
2010	The Pines	Little Red	Short film
2011	Frank & Jerry	Pam (executive)	Film
2013	The Journey	Mother	Short film
2013	Courage	Mavis	Short film

=== Television ===
Year	Title	Role	Notes
1967–1975	Homicide	Christy Baker / Pina Bianchi / Gail Hayes / Penny McCowan / Susie Jacobs / Lisa Duncan / Liz Fenner / Sally Foster / Jean Page	9 episodes
1970	Bellbird	Cathy	143 episodes
1972	I'm Damned if I Know		TV movie
1972	A Time for Love	Claire	1 episode
1972; 1973	Matlock Police	Carmel / Kathy Bennett	2 episodes
1973	Ryan	Katrina Skovros	1 episode
1973	Frank and Francesca		Miniseries
1974	Marion	Faye Davidson	Miniseries, 1 episode
1974; 1975	Division 4	Lena Jackson / Jo Peterson	2 episodes
1975	Cash and Company	Annie	Miniseries, 3 episodes
1976	Tandarra	Annie	Miniseries, 1 episode
1976	Power Without Glory	Maid	Miniseries, 6 episodes
1979	Twenty Good Years	Anne Fielding / Anne Goldman	20 episodes
c.1979–1980	Skyways		
1980	Prisoner	Pauline Curtis	2 episodes
1980	Water Under the Bridge	Mona	Miniseries, 4 episodes
1980	The Last Outlaw	Mrs. Devine	Miniseries, 4 episodes
1985	Five Mile Creek	Mrs. Clinton	1 episode
1986	Prime Time		
1986; 1990	The Flying Doctors	Peg Dawson / Shirley Mooreland	2 episodes
1987–1990;2005, 2015–2018; 2023–2025	Neighbours	Hilary Robinson	147 episodes
c.1991–1993	English at Work	Carmen	
1992	Songs of Praise	Presenter	
1993	Stark	Miranda, Sly's secretary	Miniseries, 1 episode
1996	Neighbours	Leslie Cornwall	1 episode
2003	The Saddle Club	Sarah	1 episode
2008	City Homicide	Paula Campani	1 episode

=== As crew ===
Year	Title	Role	Notes
2003	The Saddle Club	Dialogue coach	24 episodes

== Theatre ==
=== As actor ===
Year	Title	Role	Notes
1966	The Caucasian Chalk Circle	Grusha	Monash Teachers' College with Melbourne Youth Theatre
1966	The Pageant of the Love Tree / The Happy Journey / The Farce of the Devil's Bridge / Elegant Edward		Russell St Theatre, Melbourne with Union Theatre Rep Co
1968	The Crucible	Betty Paris	Russell St Theatre, Melbourne, Canberra Theatre, TAS tour with MTC
1968	The Magistrate	Beattie	Russell St Theatre, Melbourne, Canberra Theatre, SA tour with MTC
1968	The Prime of Miss Jean Brodie	Monica	Russell St Theatre, Melbourne with MTC
1968	Three Sisters	Irena	Russell St Theatre, Melbourne with MTC
1968	Major Barbara	Jenny Hill	Russell St Theatre, Melbourne with MTC
1969	Henry IV, Part 1	Lady Mortimer	Octagon Theatre, Perth, Keith Murdoch Court, Melbourne with MTC
1969	The Country Wife	Mrs. Squeamish	Russell St Theatre, Melbourne, Canberra Theatre with MTC
1969	A Long View		Russell St Theatre, Melbourne with MTC
1970	The Tempest	Ariel	Victorian Shakespeare Company
1970	Odyssey of a Bald Man		La Mama, Melbourne with MTC
1971	The Boors	Lucietta	Playhouse, Canberra, SA tour with STCSA
1971	The Master Builder	Child	Playhouse, Canberra with STCSA
1971	Adelaide Happening		Scott Theatre, Adelaide with STCSA
1971	The Chalk Garden	Laurel	St Martins Theatre, Melbourne with STCSA
1972	Manka and the King / The Tale of the Ox		Claremont Theatre Centre, Melbourne
1972	Fando and Liz	Liz	Claremont Theatre Centre, Melbourne
1972	Forget-Me-Not-Lane	Young Ursula	Union Hall, Adelaide, Canberra Theatre, Playhouse, Canberra with STCSA
1972	The Playboy of the Western World	Pegeen	Union Hall, Adelaide with STCSA
1974	The Removalists	Fiona	Russell St Theatre, Melbourne with MTC
1974	The Sea	Rachael	Russell St Theatre, Melbourne with MTC
1974	Pericles, Prince of Tyre	Diana	Russell St Theatre, Melbourne with MTC
1974	London Assurance	Pert	St Martins Theatre, Melbourne with MTC
1974; 1975	Equus	Jill	Russell St Theatre, Melbourne with MTC
1975	Absurd Person Singular	Jane	St Martins Theatre, Melbourne with MTC
1976	Halfway at Easter	Julie	Kew Community Theatre
1976	Arden!	Susan	Russell St Theatre, Melbourne with MTC
1977	The School for Scandal	Maria	Playhouse, Adelaide with STCSA
1977	The Cherry Orchard	Anya	Playhouse, Adelaide with STCSA
1978	The Boy Who Dared to Dream		Northland Theatrette, Melbourne
1980	The Maids	Solange	Melbourne Athenaeum with MTC
1980	Just One Last Dance	Player in TV film	Russell St Theatre, Melbourne with MTC
1981	Pete McGynty and the Dreamtime	Carrie / 1st Girl / Others	Melbourne Athenaeum with MTC
1981	The Good Person of Setzuan	Sister-in-law / Young Prostitute	Melbourne Athenaeum with MTC
1981	The London Cuckolds	Jane	Melbourne Athenaeum with MTC
1981	A Cuckoo in the Nest	Barbara Wykeham	Melbourne Athenaeum with MTC
1982	As You Like It	Celia	Melbourne Athenaeum with MTC
1982	The Changeling	Isabella	Universal Theatre, Melbourne with MTC
1983	Man and Superman	Violet Robinson	Melbourne Athenaeum with MTC
1983	The Three Sisters	Natasha	Melbourne Athenaeum with MTC
1983	The Winter's Tale	Hermione	Melbourne Athenaeum with MTC
1984	Filumena	Diana	Melbourne Athenaeum with MTC
1984	A Fortunate Life	Myra / Scott's Lady / Martha / May / Beryl / Olive	Playhouse, Melbourne with MTC
1984	Candida	Prossie	Russell St Theatre, Melbourne with MTC
1984	Pack of Lies	Thelma	Russell St Theatre, Melbourne with MTC
1985	Visions	Corina	Russell St Theatre, Melbourne with MTC
1985	Victoria Bitter	Fanny-Rose MacDonald	Playhouse, Melbourne with MTC
1986	Blithe Spirit	Edith	Playhouse, Melbourne with MTC
	Rosencrantz & Guilderstern	Ophelia	MTC
	The Typists	Silvia	STCSA
	Little Murders	Wedding Guest	STCSA
	The Glass Menagerie	Laura	
	Rashomon	Wife	
	The Heiress	Catherine	
	Abelard and Heloise: The Letters	Heloise	
	Love Letters	Melissa Gardner	
	In the Beginning was the Land		
	Gastronomica	Georgina McCrae	
	A Country Like This	One woman show	

=== As director / writer ===
Year	Title	Role	Notes
1984	The Doctor	Director	Melbourne Athenaeum with MTC
2011; 2016	Seven Little Australians	Adaptor	Jetty Memorial Theatre, Coffs Harbour, Yeronga State High School with Villanova Players Incorporated
	A Country Like This	Devisor	

== Awards ==
Year	Work	Award	Category	Result
1976	Cash and Company	Sammy Awards	Best Supporting Actress	Nominated
1985	Candida	Green Room Awards	Best Supporting Actress	Nominated
1987	Blithe Spirit	Green Room Awards	Best Supporting Actress	Nominated
