= Simon Wincer =

Australian film and television director (born 1943)

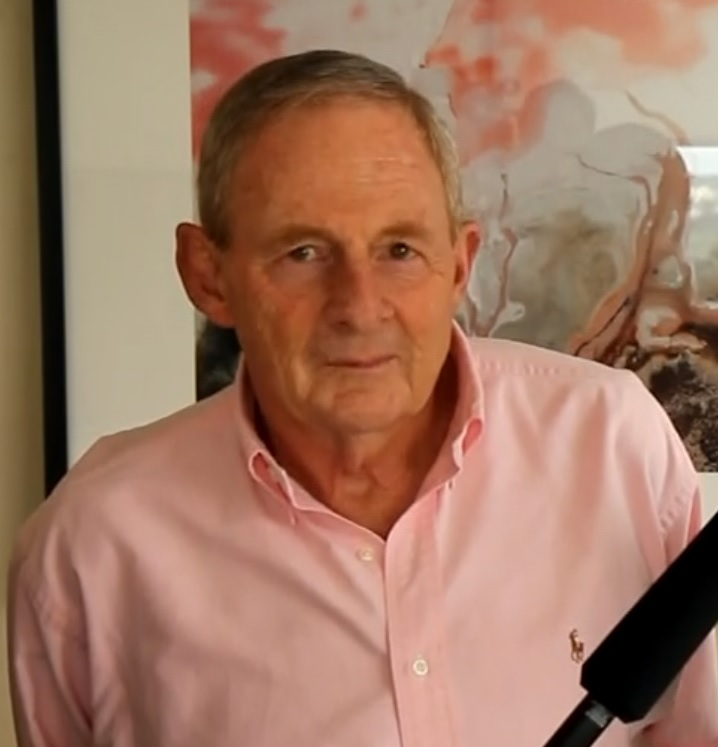
- Wincer interviewed on AccessReel.com in 2011
- Born: 1943 (age 82–83); Sydney, New South Wales, Australia
- Education: Cranbrook School, Sydney
- Occupations: Film director, television director
- Years active: 1965–2011
- Awards: See below

Simon Wincer (born 1943) is an Australian film and television director, who has worked extensively in both Australia and the United States since the early 1970s. He is a two-time AACTA/AFI Award nominee for best direction for the films Harlequin (1980) and Phar Lap (1983). He won a Primetime Emmy Award for directing the miniseries Lonesome Dove (1989).

== Early life ==
Wincer was born in Sydney in 1943. He attended Cranbrook School from 1950 to 1961. On leaving school he worked as a stagehand at HSV Channel 7, which his cousin Eric Pearce was a presenter. He gradually worked his way up to floor manager, then fill-in director. He also spent several years in London, England, where he studied drama and directed theatre.

== Career ==
Wincer began his television directing career on dramas like Matlock Police, Ryan, and Homicide. By the 1980s he had directed over 200 hours of television.

He made his feature directorial debut with 1979's thriller Snapshot. He followed this with 1980's Harlequin, a modern-day retelling of the Rasputin story set in the world of Washington D.C. politics. The film earned him his first AACTA/AFI Award nomination for Best Direction, and he was nominated again for his next film, Phar Lap.

Wincer subsequently directed the American sci-fi film D.A.R.Y.L. (1985) and the Australian World War I drama The Lighthorsemen (1987). His work on the latter helped him secure the job directing Lonesome Dove, an 4-part-miniseries for CBS, based on the novel of the same name by Larry McMurtry. The series was a considerable commercial and critical success, and Wincer won a Primetime Emmy Award for Outstanding Directing for a Limited Series. In 2008, he directed the prequel miniseries Comanche Moon.

His subsequent film directing credits have included the Tom Selleck-starring Western Quigley Down Under (1990), the buddy action-comedy Harley Davidson and the Marlboro Man (1991), the family film Free Willy (1993), the superhero film The Phantom (1996), the IMAX film The Young Black Stallion (2003), and the Damien Oliver biopic The Cup (2011).

== Personal life ==
Wincer is a supporter of the KIDS Foundation of Australia.

== Filmography ==
=== Film ===
Year	Title	Notes
1979	Snapshot	
1980	Harlequin	
1983	Phar Lap	
1985	D.A.R.Y.L.	
1987	The Lighthorsemen	Also producer
1990	Quigley Down Under	
1991	Harley Davidson and the Marlboro Man	
1993	Free Willy	
1994	Lightning Jack	Also producer
1995	Operation Dumbo Drop	
1996	The Phantom	
2001	Crocodile Dundee in Los Angeles	
2003	The Young Black Stallion	
2011	The Cup	Also writer and producer

=== Television ===
Year	Title	Notes
1971–1975	Matlock Police	17 episodes; Also writer and assistant director
1972	Division 4	15 episodes
1973	Ryan	4 episodes
1974–1976	Homicide	5 episodes; Also assistant director
1975	Cash and Company	4 episodes
1976	The Sullivans	4 episodes
1976	The Lost Islands	1 episode
1976	Tandarra	7 episodes
1976	The Box	1 episode
1977–1978	Chopper Squad	5 episodes; Also writer
1977–1980	Young Ramsay	5 episodes
1979	Skyways	2 episodes
1979	Bailey's Bird	
1979–1980	Prisoner: Cell Block H	4 episodes
1986	Walt Disney's Wonderful World of Color	1 episode
1992–1993	The Young Indiana Jones Chronicles	6 episodes
2001	Ponderosa	1 episode

==== TV films, miniseries, and specials ====
Year	Title
1976	The Haunting of Hewie Dowker
1978	Against the Wind
1986	The Last Frontier
1988	Bluegrass
1989	Lonesome Dove
1997	Flash
1998	Escape: Human Cargo
1998	The Echo of Thunder
1998	Murder She Purred: A Mrs. Murphy Mystery
1999	P.T. Barnum
2001	Crossfire Trail
2003	Monte Walsh
2005	Into the West
2008	Comanche Moon

== Awards and nominations ==
Award	Year	Category	Work	Result
Australian Film Institute Award	1980	Best Direction	Harlequin	Nominated
Australian Film Institute Award	1983	Best Direction	Phar Lap	Nominated
Directors Guild of America Award	1990	Outstanding Directorial Achievement in Movies for Television and Limited Series	Lonesome Dove	Nominated
Online Film & Television Association Award	2005	Best Direction of a Motion Picture or Miniseries	Into the West	Won
Primetime Emmy Award	1989	Outstanding Directing in a Miniseries or a Special	Lonesome Dove	Won
Sitges Award	1980	Prize of the International Critics' Jury	Harlequin	Won
Western Heritage Award	2002	Best Television Feature Film	Crossfire Trail	Won
