= End Play =

- Cover of DVD reissue
- Directed by: Tim Burstall
- Written by: Tim Burstall
- Based on: End Play by Russell Braddon
- Produced by: Tim Burstall; Alan Finney (associate)
- Starring: George Mallaby; John Waters; Ken Goodlet; Delvene Delaney
- Cinematography: Robin Copping
- Edited by: David Bilcock
- Music by: Peter Best
- Production company: Hexagon Productions
- Distributed by: Roadshow
- Release date: 1 January 1976
- Running time: 114 mins
- Country: Australia
- Language: English
- Budget: A$294,000
- Box office: A$800,000 (Australia)

End Play is a 1975 Australian thriller film directed by Tim Burstall and starring George Mallaby, John Waters and Ken Goodlet. It was an adaptation of the 1972 novel End Play by Russell Braddon. It was made by Hexagon Productions.

== Plot ==
Hitchhiker Janine Talbot is picked up and murdered by an unseen assailant. Mark Gifford, a merchant sailor on leave, then disposes of the body, attracting the suspicion of his wheelchair-using brother Robert. The police become suspicious of both brothers, who are rivals over their half-cousin, Margaret.

== Cast ==
- George Mallaby - Robert Gifford
- John Waters - Mark Gifford
- Ken Goodlet - Superintendent Cheadle
- Delvene Delaney - Janine Talbot
- Charles Tingwell - Doctor Fairburn
- Belinda Giblin - Margaret Gifford
- Robert Hewett - Sergeant Robinson
- Kevin Miles - Charlie Bricknall
- Walter Pym - Stanley Lipton
- Sheila Florance - Mavis Lipton
- Reg Gorman - TV Reporter
- Adrian Wright - Andrew Gifford
- Jan Friedl - Policewoman
- Vicki Raymond - Robbie's Mother
- Elspeth Ballantyne - Welfare Officer
- Terry Gill - Ticket Collector

== Production ==
Russell Braddon's novel was originally set in England but was relocated to Australia. Burstall made the film as part of a deliberate effort to move away from "ocker material". He was attracted to Braddon's novel because it would be simple to film as it was basically a two hander, while also preparing Eliza Fraser (1976). The movie was budgeted at $244,000 but eventually cost $294,000. Shooting commenced in January 1975.

The two leads, George Mallaby and John Waters, were familiar faces on Australian television at the time.

== Reception ==
The film performed reasonably at the box-office, and in 1979 reported that it had just broken even. It also rated highly on television, the rights for which earned Hexagon $70,000. Burstall admitted the film might have been more effective as a TV movie, but says it would have been harder to make a profit that way.

The film is rated M in New Zealand for violence and cruelty.

== Bibliography ==
- Moran, Albert & Viethm, Errol. Historical Dictionary of Australian and New Zealand Cinema. Scarecrow Press, 2005.
