= Raw Deal (1977 film) =

1977 film

- Theatrical film poster
- Directed by: Russell Hagg
- Written by: Patrick Edgeworth
- Produced by: Patrick Edgeworth; Russell Hagg
- Starring: Gerard Kennedy; Gus Mercurio
- Cinematography: Vince Monton
- Edited by: Tony Paterson
- Music by: Ronald Edgeworth
- Production company: Homestead Films
- Distributed by: Greater Union
- Release date: 4 February 1977
- Running time: 94 minutes
- Country: Australia
- Language: English
- Budget: AU$449,581

Raw Deal is a 1977 Australian western film directed by Russell Hagg made by the company responsible for the TV series Cash and Company and Tandarra.

== Plot ==
In the 1870s, the colonial administrator hires bounty hunter Palmer and gun salesman Ben to wipe out an army of Irish Catholic revolutionaries in their stronghold. Palmer and Ben recruit three gun men to help them and their mission is successful but when they go to get their payment they are trapped by treacherous officials. Ben and Palmer must fight their way to safety.

== Cast ==
- Gerard Kennedy as Palmer
- Gus Mercurio as Ben
- Rod Mullinar as Alex
- Christopher Pate as Dick
- Hu Pryce as Ned
- John Cousins as Sir Charles
- Michael Carman as Sir Frederick
- Norman Yemm as O'Neil
- Gary Day as Tyrone Leader
- Briony Behets as Alex's Lady
- Anne Scott-Pendlebury as Dick's Girl

== Production ==
In April 1976 it was announced the film would be called Both Ends Against the Middle and MIke Preston would play a role, off the back of his guest appearance in Tandarra. Preston called the film "an Australian combination of The Magnificent Seven and The Dirty Dozen."

The movie was shot in Sunbury, Victoria and Mungo, New South Wales. Finance came from the Australian Film Commission, the Victorian government, the Seven network, GUO distributors and private investors.

According to Filmink "The film uses Western tropes, but it makes some attempt to adapt to Australia – the plot revolves around the sectarianism of the time, which was a much bigger issue here than in the USA. There's references to Guy Fawkes, and cricket."

== Reception ==
The film was a commercial disappointment and failed to recover its costs.

Patrick Edgeworth later said he felt a key problem with the film was the lack of a strong female role.

=== Critical ===
Colin Bennett of The Age said "almost everything about the" film "is second hand American - even the title... We are up to better things now and should dispense with the stupid Raw Deals."

The Sun Herald felt "it makes good news of a well chosen male cast" and "the plot is packed with lively and sometimes crude action."

David Stratton called it "a rather enjoyable romp set in the country’s colonial past... it is handsomely mounted... the action scenes are effectively staged and the actors... are relaxed and professional. The film never sets its sights too high (it’s about on the level of an average spaghetti western), but it is certainly entertaining."

=== Accolades ===
Award	Category	Subject	Result
AACTA Awards (1977 AFI Awards)	Best Supporting Actor	Christopher Pate	Nominated
AACTA Awards (1977 AFI Awards)	Best Sound	Bruce Lamshed	Nominated
