= Gus Mercurio =

American-Australian actor and boxer

- Born: Augustino Eugenio Mercurio; 10 August 1928; West Bend, Wisconsin, U.S.
- Died: 7 December 2010 (aged 82); Melbourne, Victoria, Australia
- Citizenship: United States; Australia
- Occupation: Actor
- Years active: 1970–2008
- Children: 7 (including Paul Mercurio)

Augustino Eugenio "Gus" Mercurio OAM (10 August 1928 – 7 December 2010) was an American-Australian chiropractor, actor, boxing referee, boxing judge, and sports commentator. He was equally prominent as a character actor on film and television, and as a personality in the sports world. He was a long-time commentator on the Seven Network's World of Sport from 1976 to 1987. The Sydney Morning Herald described him as "one of the most recognised and loved faces in Australian television," while boxing writer Paul Upham called him "one of the great characters of Australian boxing."

== Early life ==
Of Sicilian descent, Mercurio was born in West Bend, Wisconsin, near Milwaukee, in 1928. He was the eldest child of Vincent A. Mercurio and Cecilia W. 'Mickey' Miller. He had two sisters, Gerie and Connie, and a brother, Tony. The elder Mercurio was a member of the Milwaukee mob, and according to his son, was verbally and emotionally abusive. His parents were divorced when he was seven.

Mercurio served in the United States Maritime Service, then the United States Marine Corps, and was also a chiropractor. He first visited Australia during the 1956 Melbourne Olympics and decided to stay. He worked as a chiropractor in regional Victoria for over a decade before he became prominent in the media.

He was later naturalised as an Australian citizen.

== Sports career ==
Mercurio's family had close ties to boxing. His father had boxed professionally under the ring name of Vince McGurk, and one of his uncles had boxed professionally under the name of Ray Miller. Mercurio began boxing while in the Marine Corps and turned professional after leaving the service. He participated in two professional boxing fights in 1950, losing both.

He first came to Australia as a 32-year old during the 1956 Summer Olympics, accompanying the US boxing team as a chiropractor. He decided to stay, moving to Melbourne and working as a boxing coach.

Mercurio was also an international boxing judge (refereeing a world title fight) and was also a well-known boxing promoter. Staying close to boxing, he judged 149 professional bouts and, starting in 1970 and until 1986, refereed 89 fights, including some world championship contests, such as the 1985 one between Barry Michael and Lester Ellis, which was a major sporting event in Australia. Mercurio was also a judge for several world title bouts including Roy Jones versus Clinton Woods, Pernell Whitaker versus Gary Jacobs, Azumah Nelson versus Juan LaPorte and Rocky Mattioli versus Elisha Obed.

Mercurio was a regular commentator on Channel 7's World of Sport, from 1976 until the programme's end in 1987. His appearance on the programme led him to be what The Sydney Morning Herald described as "one of the most recognised and loved faces in Australian television." He was also the movie host for Channel 10's Saturday Night with Gus Mercurio.

He later became the president of the Australian National Boxing Hall of Fame – into which he was inducted in 2008.

== Acting career ==
In 1967, Mercurio began his television career as a referee of amateur boxing matches on Channel Nine's Golden Gloves, before becoming a commentator. After attracting the attention of producer Hector Crawford, he auditioned for Crawford Productions in 1969, scoring a role in an episode of Homicide. In preparation for television acting, he gained experience in an amateur theatre production of Arthur Miller's After the Fall.

Mercurio's rugged appearance saw him play numerous 'tough' characters. His extroverted personality landed him lead roles in Cash and Company (1975), its follow-up Tandarra (1976). and the miniseries Power Without Glory (1976). He also had a regular roles in Disney series Five Mile Creek, miniseries All the Rivers Run (alongside Sigrid Thornton) and The New Adventures of Flipper.

He had a minor role in an episode of American series McCloud opposite Dennis Weaver. He played guest roles in several TV police series, including Division 4, Matlock Police and later, Blue Heelers. Other guest credits included Mission Impossible and All Together Now.

Mercurio's film appearances include The Blue Lagoon (1980), Ozploitation action film Turkey Shoot (1982) and Australian classic The Man from Snowy River (1982), once again with Sigrid Thornton. Further film credits included the internationally successful Crocodile Dundee II (1988), opposite Paul Hogan, Return to the Blue Lagoon (1991), Lightning Jack (also with Hogan) and Doing Time for Patsy Cline (1997).

Additionally, Mercurio appeared in television commercials, including one for a roofing company, playing a character called the 'Roof Fairy', in which he wore a pink tutu and a blond curly wig. He was a guest commentator on an Australian broadcast of the Super Bowl one year. He also wrote scripts for Division 4.

== Personal life ==
Mercurio was married twice and fathered seven children. He had his first three children, Jo, Vincent and Tony, with his first wife, Shirley. Two of the children were born in the US, and after the family moved to Australia, their third child was born in Ballarat, Victoria. After his first marriage failed, Shirley returned to the US with the children.

Mercurio married his second wife, Jean McKibbin, after 1959, in Swan Hill. The couple had four children – Joseph, Michael, Connie and dancer/actor Paul Mercurio. They split in 1969, when Paul was five. Michael took his life in 2000.

Mercurio remained friends with both his ex-wives. His long-term partner was Rita Ball.

In 1989, Mercurio was heading for the Argyle diamond mines in Western Australia to film an episode for his series Gus Mercurio's Australia when he had a serious car accident. This resulted in three operations on his back and one on his foot. In 1995, the Supreme Court of Western Australia awarded him $502,500, after the insurance company had originally only offered him $25,000.

== Death and legacy ==
He died on 7 December 2010, at the age of 82, in Melbourne's Epworth Hospital, from complications during surgery for a chest aneurysm. He was survived by his long-term partner Rita, six of his seven children, including Paul, and his sister Gerie in New York.

Mercurio was awarded the Medal of the Order of Australia in the 2012 Australia Day Honours for 'service to boxing as an administrator and sports commentator, as a film, television and stage actor, and to the community', the announcement being made posthumously.

== Filmography ==
=== Film ===
Year	Title	Role	Type
1974	Alvin Rides Again	Jake	Feature film
1976	Eliza Fraser	Darge	Feature film
1976	The Dreamers		Feature film
1977	Raw Deal	Ben	Feature film
1977	High Rolling	Ernie, Nightclub Bouncer	Feature film
1980	Harlequin	Mr. Bergier	Feature film
1980	The Blue Lagoon	Officer	Feature film
1980	Dead Man's Float	Mr. Dobraski	Feature film
1982	Turkey Shoot	Red	Feature film
1982	The Man from Snowy River	Frew	Feature film
1983	The Return of Captain Invincible	Noisy Garbageman	Feature film
1987	Running from the Guns	Chazza	Feature film
1988	Crocodile Dundee II	Frank	Feature film
1990	Ultraman: Towards the Future	Narrator	Feature film
1991	Return to the Blue Lagoon	First Mate	Feature film
1994	Lightning Jack	Tough Guy	Feature film
1994	Midday Crisis		Short film
1997	Doing Time for Patsy Cline	Tyrone	Feature film
2002	Dalkeith	Enzo Petroni	Feature film
2008	Not Quite Hollywood: The Wild, Untold Story of Ozploitation!	Self	Documentary film
2010	The Otherside	Carmello	Short film
2012	The Spirit of Boxing	Voice	Short film

=== Television ===
Year	Title	Role	Type
1970	The Long Arm	Bud Weiser / Syd	2 episodes
1970–1975	Homicide	12 guest roles	12 episodes
1971–1973	Matlock Police	8 guest roles	8 episodes
1971–1974	Division 4	12 guest roles	12 episodes
1973	Boney	Frail	1 episode
1973	Frank and Francesca		6 episodes
1973	Ryan	James Logan	1 episode
1974	Marion	Papa Stefano	Miniseries, 1 episode
1975	Cash and Company	Joe Brady	Miniseries, 13 episodes
1976	McCloud	Alex Demery	1 episode
1976	Solo One	Pickett	1 episode
1976	Power Without Glory	Sparring Partner / Bill Tinns	Miniseries, 3 episodes
1976	Tandarra	Joe Brady	Miniseries, 13 episodes
1976–1987	World of Sport	Commentator	
1978	The Lion's Share	Hennesy	TV movie
1978	Catspaw	The Colonel	3 episodes
1978	The Sullivans	George	9 episodes
1979	Skyways	Willard Fry	1 episode
1979	TV Follies	Maxy Missouri	1 episode
1981	Holiday Island	Bob	3 episodes
1983	All the Rivers Run	Tom Critchley	Miniseries, 4 episodes
1983–1985	Five Mile Creek	Ben Jones	37 episodes
1984	Special Squad	Haliwell	1 episode
1985	I Live with Me Dad	Waldo Skrimm	TV movie
1986	The Lancaster Miller Affair	Harry Middleton	Miniseries, 3 episodes
1986	Sword of Honour	Onassis	Miniseries, 1 episode
1986	The Challenge	Vic Romagna	Miniseries, 2 episodes
1986–1987	Gone Fishing	Presenter	
1988	Australians	Tex Rickard	Miniseries, episode: "Les Darcy"
1988	Badlands 2005	Stubbs	TV movie
1988	Mission: Impossible	Bob Connors	1 episode
1989	The Heroes	Captain Hawes	Miniseries
1991	Ratbag Hero	Referee	Miniseries
1991	The Great Air Race	'Granny' Granville	Miniseries, 1 episode
1992	Survive the Savage Sea	Mr Haines	TV movie
1992	The Flying Doctors	Happy	1 episode
1993	Time Trax	Announcer	1 episode
1993	All Together Now	Freddy Vale	1 episode
1993	Official Denial	Joe Dan	TV movie
1993	Stark	Larry	Miniseries, 2 episodes
1996–2000	Flipper	Edward 'Cap' Daulton	66 episodes
1997	Neighbours	Trainer	1 episode
2000	Tales of the South Seas		Miniseries, 1 episode
2001	Curse of the Talisman	Junkyard Owner	TV movie
2001; 2004	Blue Heelers	Harry Spencer / Jimmy Steedman	2 episodes
2003; 2008	The Saddle Club	Bluey / Mick	2 episodes
	Saturday Night with Gus Mercurio	Movie host	

== Theatre ==
Year	Title	Role	Type	Ref.
1979	Two for the Seesaw	Jerry Ryan	NSW & VIC tour, Playhouse, Canberra with Gus Mercurio Productions	
1981	True West	Saul	Playbox Theatre, Melbourne	
1985	Insignificance	The Senator	SGIO Theatre, Brisbane with QTC & Playbox Theatre, Melbourne	
1994	The Grapes of Wrath	Pa Joad	Playhouse, Melbourne with MTC	

== Works ==
- Mercurio, G., Boxin' : all you wanted to know but didn't want to fight to ask, Regus, (Kew), 1998. ISBN 0-646-35241-5
- Mercurio, G., Hang in There: Inspirational Gems to Empower You!, Wilkinson Books, (Melbourne), 1994. ISBN 1-86350-168-1
