= Arna-Maria Winchester =

Australian actress

- Born: 30 November 1949; Sydney, New South Wales Australia
- Died: 7 December 2008 (aged 59); Byron Bay, New South Wales, Australia
- Occupation: Actress
- Children: Putu Winchester
- Family: Joan Winchester

Arna-Maria Winchester was an Australian actress, appearing on film, TV and in the theatre.

== Career ==
Winchester played the lead role of Carmel Stilson in the 1980 science fiction thriller film The Chain Reaction, alongside Steve Bisley. She also played Doona Douglas in the 1984 TV film Man of Letters, opposite Warren Mitchell.

Her other film credits included sex-comedy sequel Alvin Rides Again (1974), Sidecar Racers (1975), adventure film Eliza Fraser (1976), TV movie Cass (1978), fantasy comedy horror Pandemonium (1987) and thriller Initiation (1987). She also appeared as herself in the documentary film, Not Quite Hollywood: The Wild, Untold Story of Ozploitation! about Australian New Wave cinema of the 1970s and 1980s.

Winchester also appeared in numerous television series. From 1983 to 1984, she played one of the lead roles as daughter Christine King in the 1983 TV series Kings. She also appeared in 1982 World War I drama miniseries 1915 as Brigid Scott.

Winchester had guest roles, in several Crawford Productions series including Ryan, Homicide Division 4 and Matlock Police. Further guest credits included Spyforce, Boney, Certain Women, Silent Number, Shannon's Mob, The Box, Cop Shop, Bellamy, A Country Practice, Special Squad, miniseries The Dirtwater Dynasty and Rafferty's Rules. She made later guest appearances in E Street, Heartbreak High, The Lost World, All Saints and H2O: Just Add Water.

Winchester's stage appearances included Come Live With Me at Sydney's Phillip Theatre in 1971, The Hell Of It and Baby Baby at Sydney's Stables Theatre in 1982 and La Musica at Lookout Theatre in 1996.

== Personal life ==
Winchester was married to Terry Stanton and lived with him in Bali, where she opened a clothing boutique, while Stanton worked as a hotel manager.

She gave birth to son, Putu (meaning 'first born') Sugiarta Winchester-Stanton in Denpasar on New Year's Eve. Putu is also an actor, best known for playing Dennis Klinsmann in Heartbreak High from 1997 to 1999, from the age of 18. While pregnant with Putu, Winchester was bitten by a wild dog and underwent injections which compromised her health for the rest of her life.

Stanton became violent after a motorcycle accident in Bali, which led to Winchester moving back to Australia with her son, and her marriage ending.

Winchester left behind a grandson, Ryder.

== Death ==
Winchester died from a brain tumour in Byron Bay in 2008. At her wake, her son Putu and ex-husband Stanton got into a physical fight, resulting in Stanton being placed in a coma and eventually dying. Putu was cleared of any wrongdoing in his father's death.

== Filmography ==
=== Film ===
Year	Title	Role	Type
1974	Alvin Rides Again	Nancy	Feature film
1975	Sidecar Racers	Marlene	Feature film
1976	Eliza Fraser	Mrs Cameron	Feature film
1976	McManus MPB	Policewoman Farrow	TV movie
1977	Out of It	Hitch-Hiker	Film
1978	Cass		TV movie
1980	The Chain Reaction	Carmel Stilson	Feature film
1984	Man of Letters	Doona Douglas	TV movie
1985	Taking a Look	Woman	Short film
1987	Coda	Dr Steiner	TV movie
1987	Pandemonium	B. De Woolf / Wife	Feature film
1987	Initiation	Sal	Feature film
1997	Dust Off the Wings	Guest	Film
1992	September	Her	Short film
2008	Mixed Bag	Brigid	Short film
2008	Not Quite Hollywood: The Wild, Untold Story of Ozploitation!	Herself	Documentary film

=== Television ===
Year	Title	Role	Type
1969–1975	Homicide	Mary Callaghan / Pam Condon / Shirley White / Valerie Kersten / Margaret Jackson	5 episodes
1970	Phoenix Five	Leonian	S1E3: "To End Is to Begin"
1971	The Comedy Game		S1E4: "Gaudeamus Igitur"
1971–1972	Spyforce	Jill Stewart	3 episodes
1972	Boney	Robin Pointer	S1E9: "Boney and the Black Virgin"
1972–1974	Matlock Police	Poppy Reid / Julie Turner / Judy Winter	3 episodes
1973	Certain Women		
1973	The Evil Touch	Jeanette / Evie	2 episodes
1973; 1974	Ryan	Misty / Terri Davis	2 episodes
1973; 1975	Division 4	Janie / Melanie	2 episodes
1974	This Love Affair	Diane	S1E3: "Good Time Charley – The Chequer Cab Kid"
1975	Silent Number	Leah	S1E31: "The Outlook for Monday"
1975	Shannon's Mob	Ingrid	S1E10: "The Playpen"
1976	The Box	Ann Chambers	2 episodes
1976	Up The Convicts		
1980–1982	Cop Shop	Ruth Hill / Nancy O'Neil	4 episodes
1981	Bellamy	Gwen	S1E1: "The Massage Girl Murders"
1981	Sporting Chance		S1E5: "99th in the World"
1982	1915	Brigid Scott	Miniseries, 3 episodes
1983	The Dismissal		Miniseries, episode 2
1983	A Country Practice	Frances McNichol	2 episodes
1983–1984	Kings	Christine King	13 episodes
1984	Special Squad	Cassie Summers	Episode 17: "Wild Man"
1985–1987	The Fast Lane		S1E7: "The Sound of One Hand Counting"
1988	The Dirtwater Dynasty	Mrs Tarbox	Miniseries, episode 1
1989	Rafferty's Rules	Rose Willis	S5E5: "Out of Line"
1991	Boys from the Bush	Gloria Goodson	Episode 2: "Poetic Galah"
1993	E Street	Helen Newman	Episode 396
1997	Heartbreak High	Michelle Williams	S5E34
2000; 2001	The Lost World	Hagen Queen / Lor	2 episodes
2002	All Saints	Susanne Zinenko	S5E31: "Where the Heart Is"
2006	H2O: Just Add Water	Aunt Thea	S1E7: "Moon Spell"

== Theatre ==
Year	Title	Role	Type
1969	The Imaginary Invalid	Louise	Theatre Royal, Hobart
1969	Mrs Porter and the Angel	Tatty Hollow	PACT Youth Theatre, Sydney
1971	Come Live With Me		Phillip St Theatre, Sydney
1973	Jugglers Three	Keren	Playbox Theatre, Melbourne with MTC
1974	The Chapel Perilous	Sally Banner	Sydney Opera House with Old Tote Theatre Company
1975	Ivanov		Sydney Opera House
1975	A Programme on Farce		UNSW Old Tote Theatre, Sydney
1976	Look Back In Anger		Monash University with The Alexander Theatre Company
1981	Outside Edge	Ginnie	Marian St Theatre, Sydney
1982	The Hell Of It		Stables Theatre, Sydney with Griffin Theatre Company
1982	Baby Baby	Myra	Stables Theatre, Sydney with Griffin Theatre Company
1985	Steaming		Seymour Centre, Sydney, Canberra Theatre
1996	La Musica		Lookout Theatre
2004	Howard the Arselicker		Seymour Centre, Sydney with 24HRRR
