= Alvin Rides Again =

1974 film by Robin Copping, David Bilcock

- Directed by: David Bilcock; Robin Copping
- Written by: Alan Hopgood; Tim Burstall; Alan Finney
- Produced by: Tim Burstall
- Starring: Graeme Blundell; Alan Finney
- Cinematography: Robin Copping
- Edited by: Edward McQueen-Mason
- Music by: Brian Cadd
- Production company: Hexagon Productions
- Distributed by: Roadshow; Umbrella Entertainment
- Release date: December 1974
- Running time: 89 mins
- Country: Australia
- Language: English
- Budget: A$300,000
- Box office: $1,880,000 (Australia)

Alvin Rides Again is a 1974 Australian sex-comedy film sequel to Alvin Purple. It was directed by David Bilcock and Robin Copping, who were regular collaborators with Tim Burstall. It was rated M unlike its predecessor which was rated R. Alvin Rides Again still features a lot of full frontal nudity.

== Premise ==
Alvin Purple is unable to hold down a job because of his appeal to women. He and his friend Spike help a team of women cricketers win a match by playing in drag, and decide to spend their share of the prize money in a casino. Alvin discovers he is identical in appearance to gangster Balls McGee. When Balls is killed, Alvin is forced to take his place.

== Cast ==
- Graeme Blundell as Alvin Purple / Balls McGee
- Alan Finney as Spike Dooley
- Gus Mercurio as Jake
- Noel Ferrier as The Hatchet
- Abigail as Mae
- Jon Finlayson as The Magician
- Kris McQuade as Mandy
- Chantal Contouri as Boobs la Touche
- Jeff Ashby as Loopy Snieder
- Frank Wilson as House Detective
- Ross Bova as The Dwarf
- Briony Behets as Girl in Taxi
- Arna-Maria Winchester as Nancy
- Frank Thring as Fingers
- Clare Balmford as Employment Clerk
- Dina Mann as Woman Cricketer +cat
- Candy Raymond as Girl in Office
- Esme Melville as Cleaning Lady
- Reg Gorman as Bookmaker
- Terry Gill as Male Barracker
- John Michael Howson as Bell Boy
- Maurie Fields as Garage Proprietor
- Penne Hackforth-Jones as Woman Cricketer

== Production ==
Tim Burstall said neither he, Alan Hopgood nor Graeme Blundell was particularly interested in making a sequel to Alvin Purple but the film was so successful, Hexagon Productions wanted a follow-up. Blundell wanted to avoid being typecast so a story was created which gave him a chance to play a double role. Burstall, who claims he wrote most of the script with Al Finney, says that:

When it came to the crunch, Blundell failed to differentiate between paying Balls and playing Alvin pretending to be Balls. In my view, the film fails for precisely that reason, i.e. Alvin is lost.

== Release ==
Alvin Rides Again was the recipient of some more controversy when it was released, but was only rated M. It did not perform as well as its predecessor, but still grossed $600,000 by the end of 1977 and ended up taking $1,880,000 at the box office in Australia, which is equivalent to $12,690,000 in 2009 dollars.

John D. Lamond, who worked on the film's release, thought the filmmakers made a mistake making it "less sexy, because they didn’t want to lose any potential audience...so the second one wasn’t rated R and it flopped, fell on its arse after the first month".

== Home media ==
Alvin Rides Again was released on DVD by Umbrella Entertainment in April 2011. The DVD is compatible with region codes 2 and 4 and includes special features such as the theatrical trailer, picture gallery and interviews with Tim Burstall, Alan Hopgood and Robin Copping.
