= Russell Hagg =

Australian designer and director (born 1938)

- Born: 1938; Melbourne, Victoria, Australia
- Died: 10 February 2022 (aged 83–84); Melbourne, Victoria, Australia
- Education: University of Melbourne
- Occupations: Designer, director, script writer, film maker
- Children: Georgina Haig (daughter) Julian Haig (son)

Russell Hagg (1938 – 10 February 2022) was an Australian designer, director, script writer and film maker.

== Early life ==
Hagg grew up in Ivanhoe, a suburb of Melbourne, Victoria and studied an architecture degree at the University of Melbourne in the early 1960s. After graduating, he drove a Kombi with friends from Singapore to England, through Afghanistan. When he got to England, he worked as an architect but aspired to work in film.

== Career ==
Before becoming a designer in British films, Hagg worked for Crawford Productions as a writer and director.

Hagg was the art director on 1971 cult Stanley Kubrick film A Clockwork Orange while working in London. He returned to Australia in the 1970s, working for Crawford Productions, starting his own company and undertaking scriptwriting. He went on to write Brian Trenchard-Smith's 1983 children's adventure film BMX Bandits, starring Nicole Kidman in her first big screen film role.

Hagg was the original director for 1986 Australian adventure film Frog Dreaming (aka The Quest) starring Henry Thomas of E.T. fame, before Trenchard-Smith took over direction, two weeks in.

Hagg also worked in television including Australian series Chances, Water Rats and Blue Heelers.

== Personal life ==
At the age of 47, Hagg had a daughter, actress Georgina Haig, together with artist, Gillian Haig, before welcoming son Julian three years later. They raised their kids in Red Hill, on the Mornington Peninsula in Victoria. The couple separated and subsequently divorced, when Georgina was a teenager. Hagg then moved to McCrae, a suburb of Melbourne. He became a grandfather through Georgina.

After Hagg died in 2022, his daughter wrote, directed and starred in short film Ashes, inspired by her relationship with him.

== Filmography ==
=== Film ===
Year	Title	Role	Notes
1971	A Clockwork Orange	Art director	
1977	Raw Deal	Director / producer	
1979	Taxi	Director	
1980	Harlequin	Script editor	
1981	The Survivor	Script editor	
1983	BMX Bandits	Writer	
1986	Frog Dreaming	Original director	
1999	The Cup		

=== Television ===
Year	Title	Role	Notes
1975	Cash and Company	Director	5 episodes
1976	Cash and Company	Producer	13 episodes
1976	Tandarra	Director	6 episodes
1976	Tandarra	Producer	13 episodes
1983–1984	Matlock Police	Script editor	30 episodes
1992	Chances	Script editor	12 episodes
1994–1995	Blue Heelers	Script editor	8 episodes
