= Norman Yemm =

Australian rules footballer, born 1933

- Born: 23 March 1933; Elsternwick, Victoria, Australia
- Died: 3 February 2015 (aged 81); Rosebud, Victoria, Australia
- Other name: Norm Yemm
- Occupations: Actor (television and film; opera bariton; musical theatre performer; sportsman
- Years active: 1958–2010 (actor)
- Known for: Homicide; The Sullivans
- Spouse: Amanda Yemm
- Partner: Emmy Hardy
- Children: Bryden Yemm; Jodie Yemm; Samantha Yemm

Norman Yemm (23 March 1933 – 3 February 2015) was an Australian actor, opera singer and sportsman. In his drama career he primarily appeared in characters roles in TV and film, and featured in musical theatre. As an athlete he was a track and field competitor and professional footballer, who briefly played in the VFL for Essendon and Port Melbourne Football clubs.

== Career ==
=== Film and TV ===
Yemm's film roles included Night of Fear and The Fourth Wish. On the small screen, he was perhaps best remembered for his long-running role in the television drama The Sullivans as Norm Baker. He had previously played regular roles in Homicide as Detective Jim Patterson and Number 96 as Harry Collins.

Further TV credits included Prisoner as police officer Eddie Stevens, Division 4, Matlock Police, Riptide, Tandarra, A Country Practice, Possession, Neighbours, The Henderson Kids, Blue Heelers and Something in the Air.

=== Theatre ===
Yemm appeared in such roles as Don Pasquale, and was a frequent performer in musical theatre including roles in Oklahoma and The Pirates of Penzance, South Pacific and The Sound of Music. As a vocalist, he spent years as chief baritone with Opera Australia.

== Sporting achievements ==
Yemm was a professional track athlete for most of his adult life, winning 96 finals, including three races at the Stawell Gift. Yemm was also an Australian rules footballer, having played for Victorian Football Association (VFA) club Port Melbourne. Transferring from Essendon to Port Melbourne in June 1956, he debuted at centre half-back in the Round 14 match against Oakleigh and reprised that role against Prahran the following week. Dropped for the Round 16 match against Coburg, Yemm would fail to regain his place for the rest of the season, but remained selected as an emergency during the 1956 finals series. This included Port's losing grand final match against Williamstown.

== Personal life ==
Norman Yemm was born in 1933 in Elsternwick, Victoria. He has an identical twin brother, Gordon, who is a professional musician and shares Norman's success on the track and as a performer.

"An actor's greatest attribute is to have a good memory, but I've always had a bad one." That didn't stop him from working that much harder to remember his lines on stage and screen, and it was some old-fashioned blood, sweat and tears that brought the brothers their success. He has three children; his daughter Jodie Yemm is an actress.

== Death ==
Yemm died on 3 February 2015, aged 81, and his death was announced two days later.

== Discography ==
=== Singles ===
Year	Title	Peak chart positions
Year	Title	AUS
1973	"Darlin' Vera" / "Jean"	95

== Filmography ==
=== Film ===
Year	Title	Role	Notes
1959	On the Beach	Submarine Crewman (uncredited)	Feature film
1973	Night of Fear	The Hermit	Feature film
1975	Plugg	Inspector Closer	Feature film
1976	The Fourth Wish	Specialist	Feature film
1977	Raw Deal	O'Neil	Feature film
1993	Joh's Jury	Kevin	TV movie
1994	Lex and Rory	Drunk	Feature film
2003	The Way Back	Norm	Feature film
2008	Lover's Walk		Short film
2010	The Beautiful and Damned		Feature film
2010	El Monstro Del Mar!	Joseph	Feature film (final film role)

=== Television ===
Year	Title	Role	Notes
1965–1972	Homicide	Detective Jim Patterson / Malcolm Timms / Frank Bates / Errol Stewart / Blue Carmody / Geoff Archer / Bob Hills / Ivan Hondross	130 episodes
1968–1969	Riptide	Const. Bob Rix / Andy Mercer	2 episodes
1969–1973	Division 4	Jack Miller / Stan Murray / Ernie	3 episodes
1972	Redheap		TV series
1972–1974	Number 96	Harry Collins	35 episodes
1974–1975	Matlock Police	Reg Walker / Max Cooper	2 episodes
1976	Tandarra	Taggart	Episode: "Shadow of the Past"
1976–1977	The Sullivans	Norm Baker	12 episodes
1982	A Country Practice	Stewart Lawson	2 episodes
1983–1984	Prisoner	Eddie Stevens	12 episodes
1985	Possession	John Andrews	
1986–1998	Neighbours	Ray Murphy / Jack O'Connor	18 episodes
1987–1988	The Henderson Kids	Mr Summers	6 episodes
1996–2001	Blue Heelers	Roy Fletcher / Dan Ballard / Nigel Carmody	3 episodes
1998	Moby Dick	Carpenter	2 episodes
2001	Something In The Air	Old Mac	Episode: "Reading the Signs"

== Theatre ==
Year	Title	Role	Notes
1958	Bells Are Ringing		Princess Theatre, Melbourne
1958	Femmes and Furs		Tivoli Theatre, Melbourne, Tivoli Theatre, Sydney
1959	Oklahoma	Curly	Theatre Royal, Hobart, Theatre Royal, Melbourne, National Theatre, Launceston
1959	Aladdin in the Wonderful Lamp		Theatre Royal, Adelaide
1960–61	South Pacific	Lt. Joe Cable	Theatre Royal, Hobart, National Theatre, Launceston
1961	The Most Happy Fella	Pasquale	Princess Theatre, Melbourne
1962	The Sound of Music	Admiral Von Schreiber	Princess Theatre, Melbourne, Tivoli Theatre, Sydney, Her Majesty's Theatre, Brisbane, Perth, Victoria Theatre, Newcastle, Her Majesty's Theatre, Adelaide
1963	La Boheme	Alcindoro	Her Majesty's Theatre, Adelaide
1963	Faust	Wagner	Her Majesty's Theatre, Adelaide
1963	Fledermaus!	Prince Orlofsky	Princess Theatre, Melbourne
1964	The Soldier’s Tale		Elizabethan Theatre, Sydney
1964	Finian’s Rainbow		Princess Theatre, Melbourne
1965	The Gondoliers	Giuseppe	Theatre Royal, Hobart, National Theatre, Launceston
1965	Oedipus Rex	Chorus Leader	Emerald Hill Theatre, Melbourne
1966	The Barber of Seville	Dr. Bartolo	Queensland, Majestic Cinemas, Sydney, Canberra Theatre
1967	Oklahoma!	Curley	Theatre Royal, Hobart
1967	Don Pasquale	Singer	Canberra Theatre
1967	The Flying Dutchman	Singer, Baritone	Her Majesty's Theatre, Adelaide
1967, 1968, 1976	Man of La Mancha	Dr. Carrasco	Comedy Theatre, Melbourne, Her Majesty's Theatre, Adelaide, Her Majesty's Theatre, Brisbane
1971	The Melbourne Opera Season 1971	Actpr / Singer	Princess Theatre, Melbourne
1971	Help, Help the Globollinks!	Actor / Singer	Princess Theatre, Melbourne
1975	The Threepenny Opera	Colonel Brown	Playhouse, Adelaide with New Opera South Australia
1982	Pirates of Penzance	The Pirate King	National Theatre, Melbourne, Theatre Royal, Hobart with Tasmanian Chamber Orchestra
1983	The Gondoliers	Don Alhambra Del Bolero	Monash University, Festival Theatre, Adelaide
1984, 1985	H.M.S. Pinafore	Sir Joseph Porter	Monash University, Polly Woodside, Melbourne with Column Theatre Company
1986	Kismet	Hajj	Canberra Theatre with Canberra Philharmonic Society
1988	The Mikado		His Majesty's Theatre, Perth with West Australian Opera
1990	Down an Alley Filled With Cats		Coober Pedy with Harvest Theatre Company
1995	The Best of Gilbert and Sullivan	Singer	Mietta's, Melbourne
1995	H.M.S. Pinafore	Artistic Director	Polly Woodside, Melbourne with Column Theatre Company
2003–04	South Pacific	Captain George Brackett	State Theatre, Melbourne, Theatre Royal, Sydney with The Production Company
2004	The Mikado		Darebin Arts and Entertainment Centre, Melbourne, Darwin Entertainment Centre

== Sources ==
- Atkinson, G. (1982) Everything you ever wanted to know about Australian rules football but couldn't be bothered asking, The Five Mile Press: Melbourne; ISBN 0 86788 009 0.
