= Noel Ferrier =

Australian television personality and comedian

- Born: 20 December 1930; Melbourne, Victoria, Australia
- Died: 16 October 1997 (aged 66); Sydney, New South Wales, Australia
- Occupations: Television personality; comedian; stage and film actor; raconteur and theatrical producer
- Awards: Logie for Most Popular Program in Victoria (1964); Logie for Best Australian Comedy (1971)
- Honours: Member of the Order of Australia (1989)

Noel Ferrier AM (20 December 1930 – 16 October 1997) was an Australian television personality, comedian, stage and film actor, raconteur, and theatrical producer. He had an extensive theatre career which spanned over fifty years.

== Biography ==
Noel Ferrier was born in Melbourne in 1930. He is remembered for his trademark glasses and ever present Cuban cigar. A member of the first Australian professional repertory company, the Union Theatre Repertory Company (now the Melbourne Theatre Company), he created the role of 'Roo' in the original production of Summer of the Seventeenth Doll at the Union Theatre of the University of Melbourne.

He appeared in numerous films and television productions. A contemporary of Barry Humphries, in 1956 he was the "interviewer" of the first onstage appearance of a certain Mrs. Norm Everage, later known universally as Dame Edna Everage.

He was the original host of the late-1950s Seven Network (HSV-7) series The Late Show. To ease the workload on Graham Kennedy, he was invited by the Nine Network (GTV9) to host a Friday night version of In Melbourne Tonight from 1963 to 1965. This was stylistically different from that of Kennedy's IMT – "dyed-in-the-wool IMT viewers switched off in their droves" – Noel Ferrier's In Melbourne Tonight (as it was known) attracted a separate and loyal audience, resulting in a Logie for Most Popular Program in Victoria in 1964. Following this success, the network decided to relay the show in Sydney on TCN9, but in the early hours of the following morning after live telecasts of World Championship Wrestling.

He produced Alice in Wonderland for JC Williamson at the Comedy Theatre in December 1961 - February 1962 and starred as both Humpty Dumpty and the Queen of Hearts.

After his period on IMT finished in 1965, he started a morning radio show in Melbourne on 3UZ with Mary Hardy called "The Noel and Mary Show", which contained a riotously funny serial known as "The House on the Hill" featuring Sir & Lady Ernest Snatchbull, "set in a mythical Government House and loosely based on the vice-regal column in The Age... the real Governor of Victoria of the time was a (reputedly) devoted fan... whereas his wife was said to have abhorred it."

He appeared in such television series as Riptide (1969), Skippy (1970), as well as a numerous characters in the Crawfords' stable of productions, including Homicide (1969), Division 4 (1970, 1971 and 1975), and Matlock Police (1973, 1974 and 1975). He starred in a pilot for a TV series The Undertakers that aired in 1971 but was not picked up. He was the host of the 1978 panel game show Micro Macro on the ABC.

During the 1980s, he focused on his first love, the stage. In 1982, he set up the musical theatre arm of the Elizabethan Theatre trust and produced a revival of Sound of Music, starring Julie Anthony and a very successful restaging of Pirates of Penzance featuring Jon English.

Ferrier played both Colonel Pickering and Alfred P. Doolittle (after Warren Mitchell relinquished the role) in a production by the Victoria State Opera of My Fair Lady. His turn as Doolittle requiring a recasting of the chorus to ensure there were strong enough members to carry him off stage for the end of "Get me to the church on time".

For the STC he appeared in the original productions of David Williamson's Son's of Cain and The Perfectionist alongside Robyn Nevin and Hugo Weaving which toured to the Spoleto festival in 1985.'

In 1988, he became artistic director of the Marian Street Theatre.

Ferrier played Herod in Harry M. Miller's September 1994 - February 1995 touring revival of Jesus Christ Superstar. Worried that he might fall down the huge staircase set and crush Jesus (thus changing the traditional story) he had to have two chorus girls guide him down whilst "singing" the King Herod Song; bringing the house down with his somewhat questionable cry of "Jeeeeeeeezuz!" at the top of the stairs.

The following year he joined Tom Burlinson in How To Succeed In Business Without Really Trying in 1992 where he proceeded to steal the show with his performance as J.B Biggley.

In 1971, he won the award for Best Australian Comedy with Noel Ferrier's Australia A-Z. He was a regular panelist in Graham Kennedy's popular game show Blankety Blanks. His movie credits include Avengers of the Reef (1973), Alvin Purple (1973), Alvin Rides Again (1974), Scobie Malone (1975), Deathcheaters (1976), Eliza Fraser (1976), Turkey Shoot (1982), The Year of Living Dangerously (1982), and Backstage (1988). He received an AFI nomination for Best Actor for his role in Eliza Fraser. His final movie role was in Paradise Road (1997).

== Death ==
Noel Ferrier died 15 October 1997 in Sydney, aged 66, reportedly from a heart attack.

== Honours ==
In 1989 he was appointed a Member of the Order of Australia.

== Personal life ==
In 1960 he married Susanne de Berenger, a noted artist and multiple Archibald Prize finalist, a decision he frequently claimed "proved to be... a lifesaver". Their son Tim (born 1962), is a successful production designer. Ferrier's autobiography, published in 1985, is called There goes Whatsisname, in which he discusses his battles with alcoholism, as well as his numerous career triumphs and failures.
