= Gerard Kennedy (actor) =

Australian actor (1932–2025)

- Born: 8 March 1932; Perth, Western Australia, Australia
- Died: 21 April 2025 (aged 93); Gosford, New South Wales, Australia
- Occupation: Actor
- Years active: 1965–2015
- Known for: Hunter, Division 4
- Notable work: Homicide; Prisoner; Against the Wind; The Flying Doctors
- Awards: Gold Logies × 2; Silver Logies × 3; Penguin Awards × 3; Australian Television and Film Award

Gerard Kennedy (8 March 1932 – 21 April 2025) was an Australian double Gold Logie award-winning actor.

Kennedy started his career in theatre, before going on to appear in early television series, primarily with Crawford Productions, with several supporting roles in the police series Homicide and costarring in the espionage series Hunter as the breakout fan favorite baddie, Kragg.

He shot to national fame, however, starring with Ted Hamilton and Terence Donovan in the police procedural Division 4 as Detective Frank Banner, which won him back-to-back Gold Logies. Kennedy also appeared in the cult series Prisoner, The Flying Doctors and in crime series Underbelly and had numerous feature film roles during a career that spanned 50 years in the industry.

== Early life ==
Kennedy was born in Perth, Western Australia, on 8 March 1932, the son of local actress and writer Phyllis Ophel.

== Career ==
Kennedy played six different characters in guest appearances in Crawford Productions television series Homicide and in 1967 he shot to fame as the antagonist in the Australian television spy drama Hunter, becoming so popular that his character changed sides, eventually becoming the main character after lead actor Tony Ward left the series. Kennedy won a TV Week Logie Award for "Best New Talent" for his portrayal of the character.

Kennedy followed this with a starring role in the police procedural television series, Division 4, winning multiple Logie Awards—including two Gold Logies as most popular personality on Australian TV—for his work in the series. He consistently acted in Australian television and film productions since that time.

Later regular television series roles included Tandarra in 1976, Bellbird in 1977, the miniseries Against the Wind in 1978, Skyways from 1979–1981, Golden Pennies in 1985, and The Flying Doctors between 1986 and 1989 (non-consecutive episodes).

Guest television roles included appearances in Carson's Law, Prisoner, A Country Practice, Blue Heelers, City Homicide, The Saddle Club, and Neighbours. In 2008, he played Graham "The Munster" Kinniburgh in Underbelly and in Fat Tony & Co..

Kennedy's final credit was in the television series Glitch in 2015.

== Later life and death ==
Kennedy resided at a nursing care facility on the New South Wales, Central Coast, where he died on 21 April 2025, at the age of 93.

== Filmography ==
=== Film ===
Year	Title	Role	Notes
1976	Eliza Fraser	Martin Cameron	Feature film
1977	Raw Deal	Palmer	Feature film
1977	The Mango Tree	Preacher Jones	Feature film
1978	Newsfront	Frank Maguire	Feature film
1978	The Irishman	Chad Ingram	Feature film
1979	The Last of the Knucklemen	Tarzan	Feature film
1980	Fatty Finn	Tiger Murphy	Feature film
1982	The Plains of Heaven	Lenko	Feature film
1987	The Lighthorsemen	Ismet Bey	Feature film
1987	Running from the Guns	Big Jim	Feature film
1992	Garbo	Trevor	Feature film
1993	Body Melt	Detective Sam Phillips	Feature film
1994	Ebbtide	Fredericks	Direct-to-video film
1996	Inner Sanctuary	Father Kelly	
2002	Blood Crime	Kaiwanasha	TV film
2005	Plains Empty	Old Fella	Short film
2007	Lucky Miles	Kangaroo Shooter	Feature film
2013	Wolf Creek 2	Jack	Feature film

=== Television ===
Year	Title	Role	Notes
1966	Homicide	6 guest characters	6 episodes
1967	Hunter	Kragg	65 episodes
1974	Rush	Jim Dawson	1 episode
1969–1975	Division 4	Senior Detective / Detective Sgt. Frank Banner	301 episodes
1976	Cash and Company	Ryler	1 episode
1976	King's Men		1 episode
1976	Tandarra	Ryler	13 episodes
1976	Power Without Glory	Dick Bradley	4 episodes
1977	Bellbird	Edward Grey	3 episodes
1977	Bluey	Doug Stewart	1 episode
1978	Case for the Defence	Jack	1 episode
1978	Against the Wind	Dinny O’Byrne	7 episodes
1979–1982	Skyways	Gary Doolan	TV series
1980	The Sullivans	Sergeant Nelson	2 episodes
1980	The Last Outlaw	Harry Power	4 episodes
1981	Bellamy	Blake	Episode: "The Bank You Can Trust"
1982	1915	Dent	Miniseries, 1 episode
1983	The Coral Island	Bloody Bill	4 episodes
1983	Carson's Law	James Dolman	8 episodes
1979–1983	Cop Shop	Franky Brady	3 episodes
1984	Five Mile Creek	Mr O'Bannion	1 episode
1984	Special Squad	Harry Tait	1 episode
1984	A Country Practice	Bruce Walters	Episodes: "Elementary Miss Watson: Parts 1 & 2"
1985	Prisoner	Al	4 episodes
1985	Golden Pennies	Uriah Lovejoy	8 episodes
1986	The Flying Doctors	Les Foster	Episode: "Return of the Hero"
1986	Studio 86	Minas	1 episode
1988	Emma: Queen of the South Seas	Captain Rabardy	2 episodes
1988–1990	Mission: Impossible	Karmak / Greg Usher	2 episodes
1989–1990	The Flying Doctors	Luke Mitchell	Recurring role
1990	A Country Practice	Theo Kourous	Episodes: "The Trouble with Theo: Parts 1 & 2"
1990	Col'n Carpenter	Dwayne	1 episode
1991	Acropolis Now	Savas	1 episode
1992	Boys from the Bush	Jokey Jones	1 episode
1992	Bligh	Father O'Brien	1 episode
1994	Frontline	Ian Farmer, Station Manager	5 episodes
1999	Thunderstone	Dr. Pretorius	26 episodes
2000	The Lost World	Old Sigurd	1 episode
1994–2001	Blue Heelers	Various	5 episodes
2001	Pizza	Agent Dave	1 episode
2002	Stingers	Franco Corelli	1 episode
2002	Beastmaster	Nessis	1 episode
2002	Neighbours	Pat Scully	Recurring
2004	All Saints	Neville West	1 episode
2005	Scooter: Secret Agent	Baxter	1 episode
2005	Dramatically Black	Old Fella	1 episode
2008	Underbelly	Graham "The Munster" Kinniburgh	7 episodes
2010	City Homicide	Ralph Druitt	Episode: "Protection"
2012	Conspiracy 365	Bart Ormond	2 episodes
2014	Fat Tony & Co.	Graham "The Munster" Kinniburgh	3 episodes
2015	Glitch	Leon Massola	2 episodes

== Awards ==
Year	Association	Category	Work	Result
1969	Logie Awards	George Wallace Memorial Logie for Best New Talent	Hunter	Won
1969	Penguin Award	Best Actor	Division 4	Won
1970	Penguin Awards	Leading Talent in a Drama Series	Division 4	Won
1971	Logie Awards	Gold Logie	Division 4	Won
1971	Logie Awards	Best Actor	Division 4	Won
1972	Logie Awards	Gold Logie	Division 4	Won
1972	Logie Awards	Best Actor	Division 4	Won
1973	Logie Awards	Best Actor	Division 4	Won
1979	Australian TV and Film Award	Best Actor in a TV series	Against the Wind	Won
1987	Penguin Award	Best Performance by an Actor in a Series/Serial	The Flying Doctors	Won
