= The Last of the Knucklemen =

- DVD cover
- Written by: Tim Burstall
- Based on: The Last of the Knucklemen by John Power
- Produced by: Tim Burstall; Byron Kennedy
- Starring: Gerard Kennedy; Michael Preston; Peter Hehir
- Cinematography: Dan Burstall
- Edited by: Edward McQueen-Mason
- Music by: Bruce Smeaton
- Production company: Hexagon Productions
- Distributed by: Umbrella Entertainment
- Release dates: May 1979 (Cannes film festival); 11 July 1979 (Australia)
- Running time: 93 minutes
- Country: Australia
- Language: English
- Budget: A$460,000
- Box office: A$180,000 (Australia)

The Last of the Knucklemen is a 1979 Australian film directed by Tim Burstall.

== Plot ==
The story involves a gang of rough miners. Tom (Peter Hehir) turns up at the mine looking for a place to hide. He allies himself with the mining foreman Tarzan (Gerard Kennedy) before the big fight.

== Cast ==
- Gerard Kennedy as Tarzan
- Michael Preston as Pansy
- Peter Hehir as Tom
- Dennis Miller as Horse
- Michael Caton as Monk
- Steve Rackman as Carl
- Michael Duffield as Methuselah
- Steve Bisley as Mad Dog
- Stewart Faichney as Tassie
- Gerry Duggan as Old Arthur
- Denise Drysdale as Whore

== Production ==
Before Tim Burstall started on Eliza Fraser he thought Hexagon Productions should make a male bonding film, and considered Rusty Bugles, The Odd Angry Shot and Last of the Knucklemen. He eventually decided on the latter. He had to wait to get the rights because the Melbourne Theatre Company were negotiating to sell the rights to the US but this fell through.

Burstall did the adaptation himself, which was largely faithful to the play. He felt that the film was weak in the first half setting up characters. Burstall:

I was trying to take the ocker stuff and cross it, as I think John Powers' play was, with anthropology. Before I rehearsed the cast, I got them to read 'The Territorial Imparity of the Native Aid'. I wanted it to be seen not just as ockerism but as anthropology. But the only people who got that were the French. It was bought in France and it's done terribly well there – much better than it ever did in Australia.

The movie was shot over six weeks in September and October 1978 mostly on sets at Melbourne's Cambridge Studios. Exterior scenes were shot in the South Australian outback town of Andamooka.

== Reception ==
The Last of the Knucklemen grossed $180,000 at the box office in Australia, which is equivalent to $703,800 in 2009 dollars. Reviews however were strong. Burstall:

I don't think they knew how to market it. A lot of women said to me, 'I'd never go to a picture that had the title The Last of the Knucklemen'. But nobody ever looked at it as an analysis of the way men work. It's a right-wing view of unionism.

John Lapsley of the Sun-Herald gave the film 4 stars concludes "It is a very strong script nicely adapted by Burstall. The situations and relationships are subtly developed - yet all through there is a vigorous, rough overlay which makes it seem anything but delicate. Apart from being a very good movie, it is also a very funny one, with a wide enough four-letter vocabulary to make the odd backward schoolgirl blush." Martha DuBose wrote in the Sydney Morning Herald "In spite of the cleverly crafted rough-edged look of the film and its peppery language, The Last of the Knucklemen is a wistful little romance on a dying breed of men." The Adelaide Advertiser's Terry Jennings commented on the films poor distribution and said of the film "Burstall has taken a modest subject and made a modest success - a well-crafted, well-acted, always entertaining adaptation of John Powers's boisterous if simple and machismo stage play." Colin Bennett in The Age says "Bruce Smeaton's music seems to be summing up 'The Last of the Knucklemen'. He uses a rousing frontier banjo ... and a set of caterwauling gibberish-lyrics." Writing in Cinema Papers Keith Connolly concludes "In sum, Knucklemen is disappointing, not for any marked defect of rendition, but rather because Burstall (who, of course, knows precisely what he is doing) keeps his sights so low." The Bulletin's Sandra Hall states "It is precisely this evenness that makes it such a frustrating film to write about. There is professionalism but no passion or originality."

== AFI Awards, 1979 ==
- Best Actor - Mike Preston - Nominated
- Supporting Actor - Michael Duffield - Nominated
- Adapted Screenplay - Tim Burstall - Nominated
- Original Music - Bruce Smeaton - Nominated
- Sound - John Phillips, Edward McQueen-Mason and Peter Fenton - Nominated
- Art Direction - Leslie Binns - Nominated
- Costume Design - Kevin Regan - Nominated

== Home media ==
The Last of the Knucklemen was released on DVD by Umbrella Entertainment in January 2012. The DVD is compatible with region codes 2 and 4 and includes special features such as the trailer, photo gallery and interviews with John Powers, Gerard Kennedy, Dan Burstall, Steve Bisley and Michael Caton.

== Original play ==
The Last of the Knucklemen
- Original language: English
- Written by: John Powers
- Setting: A mining camp, north-west Australia

Premiere
- Date: 19 November 1973
- Place: Russell St Theatre, Melbourne

John Power's play had been produced in 1973.

Leslie Rees described it as "a sequence of sketches using the same basic characters but without much development or thematic resolution".

It was performed Off-Broadway in 1983 at the American Theater of Actors, featuring Kevin O'Connor and Dennis Quaid.

== See also ==
- Cinema of Australia
