= Micro Macro =

Australian game show

- Directed by: Jacqui Culliton
- Presented by: Noel Ferrier
- Country of origin: Australia
- Original language: English
- No. of series: 1
- No. of episodes: 13

Production
- Executive producers: Lloyd Capps; Jacqui Culliton
- Running time: 30 minutes

Original release
- Network: ABC TV
- Release: 5 October – 18 December 1978

Micro Macro is a 1978 Australian television panel game show broadcast on the Australian Broadcasting Corporation. It was based on the European show of the same name. Hosted by Noel Ferrier it featured two teams of two competing to identify images flashed on a screen. Teams were led by Carol Raye and Jimmy Hannan and featured celebrity guests. First shown on Thursdays at 8pm it shifted to Mondays at 6pm due to poor ratings.

In the Age John Teerds said of the first episode "Although Ferrier claims to be "the worst compere in Australia", it is expected his control of the show will improve with practice. There are some faults which could be overcome with practice and with tighter direction." The Sun-Herald's Dale Plummer said "If you have a spare half-hour for a spot of minor brain exercise, Micro Macro could be fun, but the game is slow and the scoring obscure."

The Age's Dennis Pryor noted "The admirable Noel Ferrier rightly treats the whole thing as an absurd joke. giving his imitation of a rogue elephant waving his trunk at the sheer idiocy of the whole thing." He says that three weeks in "The regular panellists are beginning to settle down and give the show some shape."
