= Edward Ambrose Dyson =

Edward Ambrose Dyson (15 December 1908 – 26 November 1952), often known as "Amby" or "Amb Dyson" was an Australian illustrator, comics artist and political cartoonist.

== Biography ==
He was born in Melbourne on 15 December 1908, the son of Ambrose Dyson (1876–1913) and Mabel Fraser.

Dyson was a student at Yarra Park State School until 1922, when he started working as a labourer, which lasted 14 years, when he took some lessons and embarked on a full-time artistic career.

In 1944 he was working as a cartoonist for the army newspaper SALT (for Sea, Air, Land Transport). It was there he became a friend and associate of Frank Hardy, sharing Hardy's left-wing views and joining the Communist Party of Australia. He contributed drawings to Hardy's masterpiece Power Without Glory.

Dyson died on 26 November 1952.

== Bibliography ==
- Hardy, Frank (as "Ross Franklyn") Power without Glory (14 drawings by Ambrose Dyson) 1950
- Lambert, Eric Gold (13 drawings by Ambrose Dyson) Melbourne 1951
- Hardy, Frank J. The Man from Clinkapella with a foreword by Alan Marshall, ill. Ambrose Dyson 1952
- Ambrose Dyson with foreword by Frank Hardy and a memorial poem by David Martin. Ambrose Dyson Memorial Committee, 1953

== Sources ==
- McCullough, Alan Encyclopedia of Australian Art Hutchinson of London 1968
- A Dyson Bibliography
- Lambiek Comiclopedia article.
