= Cash and Company =

Australian television series

- Starring: Serge Lazareff; Gus Mercurio; Penne Hackforth-Jones; Bruce Kerr; Anne Scott-Pendlebury; John Frawley; Gerard Kennedy
- Country of origin: Australia
- Original language: English
- No. of episodes: 13

Production
- Running time: 50 minutes

Original release
- Network: Seven Network
- Release: 1975

Related
- Tandarra

Cash and Company is an Australian television period adventure series, set during the Victorian gold rush of the 1850s. It screened on the Seven Network in Australia in 1976 and on ITV (including the London Weekend Television and Anglia regions) in the UK.

== Background ==
The original series consisted of 13 one-hour episodes, and was created by Russell Hagg and Patrick Edgeworth who met working at Crawford Productions. They said they were $5,000 short when making the show - the balance was provided by Ron Casey.

Production began in July 1974 and the series premiered on the Seven Network in Brisbane on 17 April 1975, Sydney on 26 May and Melbourne on 29 May. The series was also shown at Sunday lunchtime in the United Kingdom by the London Weekend Television (LWT) Network, in advance of its airing in Australia. It was also screened at the Cannes Film Festival and sold to Sweden, the Netherlands, Yugoslavia, Ireland, Norway, Rhodesia and Nigeria. It was produced by Homestead Films, a TV production company set up by Patrick Edgeworth and Russell Hagg, who had worked together at Crawford Productions on Matlock Police. Edgeworth's brother is the musician Ron Edgeworth, who was married to Judith Durham of The Seekers.

The episodes dealt with the adventures of bushrangers Sam Cash (Serge Lazareff) and his partner Joe Brady (Gus Mercurio) and a helpful widow, Jessica Johnson (Penne Hackforth-Jones). Cash and Brady were fugitives, constantly absconding from the authorities, led by the corrupt police trooper Lieutenant Keogh (Bruce Kerr).

Lazareff decided to leave at the end of the first series, when a second series was still in the planning stages. His character was replaced by Ryler, a former bounty hunter, played by Gerard Kennedy, a former cast member of Division 4. After Kennedy's character of Ryler had appeared in one episode, he was recruited to replace Lazareff after Seven told the Homestead Films that they would not buy a second series unless the popular Logie-winning actor was cast in the new series. Patrick Edgeworth and Russell Hagg however, dispute this account. Rather, being so impressed with Gerard Kennedy's work on the last episode of Cash, they claim they told the Seven Network he was their choice to replace Lazareff, upon which Seven agreed.

The series was renamed Tandarra as the character of Sam Cash was no longer featured, and the fugitives from justice story line was removed. The character of Keogh was also dropped, and the character of Annie (Jessica's maid, played by Anne Scott-Pendlebury) only appeared in one episode. The character of Sam Cash was not mentioned at all in Tandarra, and all flashback sequences from the first series removed any reference to him.

Although the series title is taken from history, the story, events and timeline are of no relation to real life Australian bushranger, Martin Cash, whose gang went by the name of Cash and Co.

== Cast ==
=== Main ===
- Serge Lazareff as Sam Cash
- Gus Mercurio as Joe Brady
- Penne Hackforth-Jones as Jessica Johnson
- Bruce Kerr as Lieutenant Keogh

=== Guests ===
- Gerard Kennedy as Ryler
- John Frawley as Jessica's father in law
- Anne Scott-Pendlebury as Annie
- Sandy Gore as Madam
- Jerry Thomas as Harry Horlock
- Roz De Winter as Betty Horlock
- Judith Durham as Sarah Simmonds
- Jon Finlayson as Travers Lewis
- Michael Duffield as PJ Clarke
- Judy Morris as Mary Fincham
- Tony Bonner as Titus Ruffler

== Filming locations ==
The series was shot almost entirely on location in Emu Bottom Plains, Victoria. This was located near the crew lodgings location at Emu Bottom Station on the outskirts of Sunbury, Victoria, Victoria, the same area where Mad Max (1979) was filmed.
