= High Rolling =

- Promotional poster
- Directed by: Igor Auzins
- Screenplay by: Forrest Redlich
- Produced by: Tim Burstall; Alan Finney
- Starring: Joseph Bottoms; Grigor Taylor; Wendy Hughes; John Clayton; Judy Davis
- Cinematography: Dan Burstall
- Edited by: Edward McQueen-Mason
- Music by: Sherbet
- Production company: Hexagon Productions
- Distributed by: Roadshow; Umbrella Entertainment
- Release date: 4 August 1977 (Australia)
- Running time: 89 min
- Country: Australia
- Language: English
- Budget: A$400,000 or $350,000
- Box office: A$841,000 (Australia)

High Rolling (also called High Rolling in a Hot Corvette) is an Australian buddy comedy directed by Igor Auzins and written by Forest Redlich. Golden Globe Award winners Joseph Bottoms and Judy Davis are among the cast. The soundtrack for the film was provided by the Australian band, Sherbet. The film was released in Australia on 4 August 1977.

== Plot ==
Tex (Bottoms) is an American working at a carnival in Queensland. At the carnival he befriends a boxer, Alby (Taylor) and they decide to travel together to Surfers Paradise on the Gold Coast. They hitch a ride with Arnold (Clayton) but problems arise when Arnold makes unwanted advances towards Alby. Alby beats up Arnold and he and Tex flee with Arnold's suitcase and car. However, the case is full of cash and the car is stocked with marijuana. So it comes as no surprise that Arnold and his friends want them back.

Tex and Alby later give a lift to a sixteen-year-old hitch-hiker, Lynn and try to pick up two women, Barbie and Susie. Tex gets thrown out of a night club and beaten up by a bouncer so Alby takes both girls to bed.

Arnold sends thugs to get them so they end up hijacking a tourist bus. They escape and go off into the sunset with Lyn.

== Cast ==
- Joseph Bottoms as Texas
- Grigor Taylor as Alby
- Wendy Hughes as Barbie
- John Clayton as Arnold
- Judy Davis as Lynn
- Susie Macgregor as Susie
- Simon Chilvers as sideshow boss
- Gus Mercurio as Ernie, nightclub bouncer
- Robert Hewitt as Frank
- Roger Ward as Lol
- Peter Cummins as bus driver
- Gil Tucker as shooter
- Christine Amor as teenage girl
- Chantal Contouri as bus hostess
- Sean Scully as policeman
- Marilyn Vernon as teenage girl
- Terry Norris as farmer

== Production ==
This was Judy Davis' feature film debut. The film was written by Forrest Redlich and described as an Australian Butch Cassidy and the Sundance Kid. Redlich had two other scripts for Hexagon, Body Count and Dede and the Gunman.

== Reception ==
Tim Burstall later said of the film in 1979:

One couldn't describe High Rolling as a success, though it will finish breaking even four or five years after its release. I am very fond of High Rolling although in some ways it doesn't come off. There is a slight problem in Jo Bottoms' performance, which goes over a bit, and the bonding aspect works only fitfully. Still, I think Igor Auzins is a fine director and the film only narrowly misses capturing the spirit of a good AIP film. Mad Max is certainly handled better, but one can easily see the progression from Stone to High Rolling to Mad Max.

David Stratton wrote that "the film is strangely unsatisfactory, even on the most basic entertainment level; it was one of the weakest non-endings imaginable."

== Home media ==
High Rolling was released on DVD by Umbrella Entertainment in January 2013. The DVD is compatible with region codes 2 and 4 and includes special features such as the theatrical trailer, interviews with Igor Auzins and Robin Copping, and a bonus feature-length film titled The Love Epidemic.
