= Harlequin (film) =

1980 Australian film by Simon Wincer

- Theatrical film poster under alternate title
- Directed by: Simon Wincer
- Screenplay by: Everett De Roche
- Additional dialogue by: Jon George; Neill D. Hicks
- Produced by: Antony I. Ginnane
- Starring: Robert Powell; David Hemmings; Carmen Duncan; Broderick Crawford
- Cinematography: Gary Hansen
- Edited by: Adrian Carr
- Music by: Brian May
- Production companies: F.G. Film Productions; Farflight Investments; Australian Film Commission; Western Australian Film Council; ACE Theatres; Greater Union Organization
- Distributed by: GUO Film Distributors
- Release date: 20 March 1980
- Running time: 95 minutes
- Country: Australia
- Language: English
- Budget: A$800,000
- Box office: A$364,000 (Australia); A$1.2 million (international)

Harlequin (known as Dark Forces in the United States) is a 1980 Australian fantasy thriller film directed by Simon Wincer and starring Robert Powell, Carmen Duncan, David Hemmings and Broderick Crawford. The film is a modern-day retelling of the historical figure Rasputin.

== Plot ==
Deputy Governor Eli Steele goes swimming in the ocean, and in an incident mirroring the real life disappearance of Harold Holt, vanishes. There is a media frenzy surrounding the appointment of a successor to the post because sitting Governor Connors has been ill in the hospital for some time. Senator Nick Rast learns that he will be tapped to step into the role from shady political boss Doc Wheelan.

Rast's son Alex, who has been undergoing debilitating treatment for leukemia for years, celebrates his 9th birthday. He is entertained by an odd clown that seems to summon a peal of thunder on command. That evening Alex becomes bedridden after suffering a bleeding spell while brushing his teeth. The boy's doctor arrives and informs Nick and his wife Sandy that Alex's treatment is doing more harm than good. He decides to end the treatment over Sandy's strenuous objections. Suddenly, a mysterious man appears in the child’s bedroom. He announces himself as Gregory Wolfe and claims to be able to heal Alex. Sandy desperately allows him to try. Wolfe pulls Alex out of bed and his strength seems to return.

Alex's condition improves over the next several weeks, though his doctor insists this is only temporary. Wolfe is a frequent visitor to the house during Alex's convalescence, and we see him and the boy engaged in unexplainable phenomena, including telekinesis. Sandy becomes infatuated with Wolfe.

Wolfe's growing influence with the family concerns Wheelan, who believes Wolfe will threaten Nick's future political career. Wheelan directs Nick to break things off with Zoe, his longtime mistress. Things come to a head at a benefit gala hosted by the Rast family. Several guests arrive curious to see Wolfe's supposed powers in action. He dazzles and frightens the crowd with magic tricks and healing displays. He is arrested after hypnotizing and raping the Rast family's live in maid.

Wheelan and his men reveal to Nick that Wolfe is a foreign agent and charlatan. They say Alex's improvement is due to Wolfe drugging the boy with steroids and show Nick photos of Wolfe and Zoe having an affair. Sandy and Alex protest Wolfe's imprisonment and depart from the family house.

Wolfe breaks out of jail. He corners Nick alone in his house and tells him that he has been sent to warn Nick of a plot - Steele was assassinated and Governor Connors is being poisoned by Wheelan. He begs Nick to reject Wheelan and the corruption he represents. Nick chooses Wheelan and Wolfe accepts his fate. When Zoe reveals to Nick via telephone she has never met Wolfe, Nick realizes he has been deceived and rushes to save Wolfe. He is too late, and Wheelan's men shoot Wolfe several times and dispose of the body in a pond.

Wolfe's body is soon discovered, leading to a national political scandal. Nick resigns from the senate and works with authorities and the press to end Wheelan's influence. Meanwhile Alex is still healthy and is continuing to take after Wolfe.

== Cast ==
- Robert Powell as Gregory Wolfe
- David Hemmings as Nick Rast
- Broderick Crawford as Doc Wheelan
- Carmen Duncan as Sandy Rast
- Alyson Best as Alice
- Alan Cassell as Porter
- Mark Spain as Alex Rast
- John Frawley as Dr. Lovelock
- Gus Mercurio as Mr Bergier

== Production ==
=== Development ===
Simon Wincer and Everett De Roche had previously collaborated on Snapshot but were not happy with the film since it was made so hurriedly. They decided to make another film, came up with six ideas and eventually chose The Minister's Musician, a modern-day version of the Rasputin story. They did a treatment and Antony I. Ginnane became involved as producer.

Everett de Roche originally did a 400-page first draft in which the central character, Gregory Wolfe, was a priest. When the producers sent the script to the US, they were worried that this would make the film hard to market in Catholic countries so it was changed. The script was given to some American writers to work on but Wincer was not happy with the changes. As de Roche was not available, Wincer went over the script with Russell Hagg although he later said he would have preferred it if de Roche had done the job.

=== Casting ===
The script was written with David Bowie in mind for the lead role and conversations were had with Bowie but the filmmakers got "cold feet" at the last minute and cast Robert Powell. The original choice for the role of the senator was Orson Welles but he wanted $80,000 a week for two weeks so Broderick Crawford was cast instead.

=== Shooting ===
It was the first film funded by the newly formed West Australian Film Council. Funding also came from the Australian Film Commission, Greater Union, Ace Theatres of Western Australia and Pact Productions, with the final $50,000 coming from Hemdale. It was the first of several films Ginnane would make with Hemdale.

The movie was shot in late 1979 over six weeks, using Panavision. It was filmed in Western Australia because of the involvement of the West Australian Film Council, which was estimated to save the production $100,000.

The film makes a great effort to disguise the fact it is set in Australia, including dubbing Alan Cassel's voice into an American accent and referring to the American political system. This was controversial at the time because it was made with money from Australian taxpayers.

== Reception ==
The film performed poorly at the Australian box office but was very successful overseas. According to Simon Wincer it was particularly successful in South America, due in part to Robert Powell's popularity there.

== Accolades ==
Award	Category	Subject	Result
AACTA Awards (1980 AFI Awards)	Best Direction	Simon Wincer	Nominated
AACTA Awards (1980 AFI Awards)	Best Actress	Carmen Duncan	Nominated
AACTA Awards (1980 AFI Awards)	Best Editing	Adrian Carr	Nominated
AACTA Awards (1980 AFI Awards)	Best Production Design	Bernard Hides	Nominated
AACTA Awards (1980 AFI Awards)	Best Costume Design	Terry Ryan	Nominated
Saturn Award	Best International Film		Nominated
Sitges Film Festival	Medalla Sitges for Best Screenplay	Everett De Roche	Won
Sitges Film Festival	Medalla Sitges for Best Cinematography	Gary Hansen	Won
Sitges Film Festival	Prize of the International Critics' Jury	Simon Wincer	Won

== DVD releases ==
In Australia, Harlequin was released on an All Region DVD by Umbrella Entertainment on Wednesday, 27 October 2004. It was presented in a remastered 2.35:1 Anamorphic Widescreen, and Special Features were an Audio Commentary by director Simon Wincer and producer Antony I. Ginnane, a theatrical trailer and a photo gallery.

In the US, Harlequin was released as Dark Forces by Image Ent. on 8 June 2004. It was presented in 2.35:1 Widescreen, with Behind The Scenes Photo Gallery, Filmographies, Isolated Music Score and an Audio Commentary by director Simon Wincer and producer Antony I. Ginnane. It was released on Blu-ray in the US by Scorpion Releasing on 29 October 2013 under its original title.

== Bibliography ==
- Peter Beilby & Scott Murray, 'Simon Wincer', Cinema Papers Dec-Jan 1979-80
