= Eliza Fraser (film) =

- Directed by: Tim Burstall
- Written by: David Williamson
- Produced by: Tim Burstall
- Starring: Susannah York; John Waters; John Castle
- Cinematography: Robin Copping
- Edited by: Edward McQueen-Mason
- Music by: Bruce Smeaton
- Production company: Hexagon Productions Pty, Ltd.
- Distributed by: Roadshow; Umbrella Entertainment
- Release date: 16 December 1976
- Running time: 130 minutes
- Country: Australia
- Language: English
- Budget: A$1,200,000 or $1.4 million
- Box office: A$2,200,000 (Australia); A$200,000 (overseas sales)

Eliza Fraser is a 1976 Australian bawdy adventure drama film, directed by Tim Burstall and starring Susannah York, Trevor Howard, Noel Ferrier and John Castle. The screenplay was written by David Williamson.

The film was the first Australian film with a big-budget, costing A$1.2m to make. English actors Susannah York and Trevor Howard were brought from the United Kingdom to headline this Australian picture, which was filmed in Victoria, New South Wales and Queensland. The film has been described as a classic Aussie tale of colonial hardship and bawdy beginnings, and has been described as a sex romp.

== Cast ==
- Susannah York as Eliza Fraser
- John Waters as David Bracefell
- John Castle as Captain Rory McBride
- Noel Ferrier as Captain James Fraser
- Martin Harris as John Graham
- Trevor Howard as Captain Foster Fynans
- Gus Mercurio as Darge
- Charles 'Bud' Tingwell as Duncan Fraser
- Bruce Spence as Bruce McIvor
- George Mallaby as Lt Otter
- Bill Hunter as Youlden
- Gerard Kennedy as Martin Cameron
- Fabian Muir as Johnny
- Vicki Bray as Mrs Annie Fraser
- Serge Lazareff as Doyle
- Dennis Miller as Frans Cook

== Synopsis ==
Captain James Fraser, and his young wife, Eliza Fraser, sail from Sydney on the Stirling Castle. Captain Rory McBryde, the most notorious rake in New South Wales, manages to get on board and tries to seduce Eliza. Captain Fraser stops off at the penal colony of Moreton Bay which is run by Captain Fyans, who tries to seduce convict Bracefell. Bracefell escapes and hides in Eliza's room; Eliza sleeps with him, thinking he is McBryde, but is not unhappy when she sees who it is. She helps Bracefell escape.

The Frasers resume their trip on the Stirling Castle when they and the ship's crew are shipwrecked on an island near Australia on 21 May 1836. They live with the indigenous Aboriginal people, but Captain Fraser is later killed by convicts from Moreton Bay. Eliza meets Bracefell, who is now living with aborigines, and he helps rescue her.

Once rescued, Eliza earns her keep at county fairs by regaling audiences with her own tales of her adventures.

== Cast ==
Actor	Role
Susannah York	Eliza Fraser
John Waters	David Bracefell
John Castle	Captain Rory McBryde
Noel Ferrier	Captain Fraser
Martin Harris	John Graham
Trevor Howard	Captain Foster Fyans
Gus Mercurio	Lindsay Roughsey / Darge
Charles Tingwell	Duncan Fraser
John Frawley	Brown
Bruce Spence	Bruce McIver
George Mallaby	Lieutenant Otter
Bill Hunter	Youlden
Leon Lissek	Sergeant
Sean Scully	Elliott
Dennis Miller	Fyan's Cook
Gerard Kennedy	Martin Cameron
Arna-Maria Winchester	Mrs. Cameron
Carole Skinner	Mrs. Shortland
Abigail	Buxom Girl
Serge Lazareff	Doyle
Maurie Fields	John Smythe / Reporter
Vicki Bray	Mrs. Annie Fraser
John Cobley	Hodge
Martin Phelan	Stone
Fabian Muir	Eliza's Son John
Lindsay Roughse	Euenmundi
Ingrid Mason	Mrs. Otter
Peter Hammill	Copy Boy
Peter Aanensen	Restaurateur
Sandy Gore	Lady
Alan Finney	Sideshow Spruiker
Graham Matherick	Flogger / Stuntman
David Phillips	First Mate

== Production ==
Tim Burstall had been interested in telling the story of Eliza Fraser for a long time, writing a script back in 1969.

He envisioned the film as a picturesque piece in the vein of an 18th-century novel like Humphry Clinker or Tom Jones, as he felt this was closer to the Australian ocker sense of humour. Originally the movie was to have a Rashomon type structure with Eliza's story told three times from three different points of view. But eventually it was decided to turn Eliza into a comic figure. "She was essentially a con woman, and I thought the possibilities for satire were great", said Burstall.

The script was written by David Williamson. Williamson says his second draft was historically accurate "and it turned out a history of the Aborigines in North Queensland in 1836, and Hexagon didn't want to film it." So it became a comedy. Williamson said "It was fun to write because I could write gross stereotypes, villains and good guys and use classic plot devices like the reunion of lovers, which I could never do in a play."

The budget was originally $750,000. The Australian Film Commission loaned Hexagon $187,000, invested another $187,000 and Hexagon would put in the rest. Burstall had originally intended to use Wendy Hughes in the lead role, supported by Frank Thring, but Roadshow felt the movie needed an international film star. "They had what we call in the business 'a touch of the Hollywoods'", said Burstall.

Burstall met with Charlotte Rampling but did not feel she was a comedy actress. The film was meant to start on 2 January 1975 but Burstall was unable to find a lead until 11 February – this delay cost the film $50,000. The international actors cost an extra $200,000 – $125,000 for Susannah York, $48,000 for Trevor Howard and $32,000 for John Castle. This meant the budget increased to $1 million and ultimately blew out to $1.2 million. John Waters was paid $2,000 a week.

=== Filming ===
Shooting started in March 1976, taking place at Sovereign Hill, the old penal settlement of Trial Bay, and Fraser Island. About 120 aborigines were flown to Fraser Island from Mornington Island. The scale of the film meant it was much publicised and eagerly awaited.

Noel Ferrier wrote in his memoirs that he enjoyed making the film but thought it would have been better if less like Tom Jones.

For a time it seemed Hollywood might come up with a rival movie on the same topic. Shipwrecked, a $3.5 million film produced by Sandy Howard from a script by Bill Norton Snr and Michael Luke, was announced for filming on 16 June 1976. However this did not eventuate.

== Release ==
Graham Burke of Village Roadshow told John Mostyn of Hoyts he had seen an assembly cut "and it is bloody fabulous. The Williamson script sparkes in what is a breathtakingly original film that has action, story line, heart, scenic values, great performances and above all is good fun. There can be no doubt that not only will it be the biggest grossing Australian film ever it may be one of the biggest grosses world wide next year."

The film had its first public screening in Maryborough, Queensland (the largest town within 50 km of Fraser Island). In the same week, a ticket-only dinner-dance was managed by the local council in the town hall. Susannah York was in attendance, as was Tim Burstall

Burstall later claimed the film's price tag caused the press to misrepresent the movie as a serious epic when it was always intended to be a comedy, leading to poor reviews on the whole. The public liked it and the film was very successful, but struggled to recoup its large cost. It returned $600,000 to the producers, representing only half the budget. Burstall felt he made a mistake in not having an overseas partner helping him produce the film.

By July 1977 the film has grossed $1.8 million. However in July 1978 Hexagon still had $250,000 in commitments to pay for the film, which had by then been in release for 18 months.

== Home media ==
Eliza Fraser was released on DVD in June 2011. The DVD is compatible with region codes 2 and 4 and includes features such as the theatrical trailer, a photo gallery, and an interview with David Williamson, John Waters, Robin Copping and Alan Finney.
