= Penne Hackforth-Jones =

Australian actress (1949–2013)

- Born: Penelope Beatrix Hackforth-Jones; 5 August 1949; Greenwich, Connecticut, U.S.
- Died: 17 May 2013 (aged 63); Melbourne, Victoria, Australia
- Occupations: Actress, biographer
- Years active: 1967–2013

Penne Hackforth-Jones (5 August 1949 – 17 May 2013) was an American-born Australian actress and biographer.

== Early life ==
Penelope Beatrix Hackforth-Jones was born in August 1949 in Greenwich, Connecticut, to Paul and Susan Felicity (née Gullett) Hackforth-Jones and was a granddaughter of Sir Henry Gullett and niece of Jo Gullett, both Australian politicians. Her great-grandmother, Barbara Baynton, was an Australian author from the Bush Realism school of the 1890s, the same era as Henry Lawson.

She lived with her family in England before relocating to Australia in 1964. After completing her secondary education at St Catherine's School, Toorak in 1966 she attended the National Institute of Dramatic Art in Sydney until graduating in 1968.

== Career ==
In 1969, Hackforth-Jones made her first credited on-screen appearance in the Australian television series Riptide. Other early television appearances included Bellbird, Number 96, Division 4, Matlock Police, Homicide, Ryan, Young Ramsay and Skyways. She played the lead female role of Jessica Johnson in 1975 period adventure series Cash and Company and its 1976 spin-off, Tandarra.

She also appeared in such Australian television series as Butterfly Island, Cop Shop, Punishment, Bellamy, A Country Practice, Mother and Son, the miniseries Tanamera – Lion of Singapore and G.P.. She also appeared in an episode of Australian sitcom Hey Dad..! She later appeared in Murder Call, All Saints, Chandon Pictures, :30 Seconds and The Doctor Blake Mysteries. She also appeared in the 2002 TV film Heroes' Mountain, opposite Craig McLachlan, detailing the true story of ski instructor Stuart Diver and the 1997 Thredbo landslide. Her feature film roles included Dr. Sort in Alvin Purple (1973), the bridal shop manager in Muriel's Wedding (1994), Mrs. Pike in Paradise Road (1997), Cynthia Dodds in Mao's Last Dancer (2009), and Mrs. Johnson in The Tree (2010).

Hackforth-Jones was featured in a long-running television advertisement series for Kellogg's Sultana Bran in the 1980s/1990s.

Hackforth-Jones was the author of a biography of her great-grandmother, novelist Barbara Baynton, titled Barbara Baynton – Between Two Worlds.

== Death ==
Penne Hackforth-Jones was diagnosed with lung cancer in 2012, and died on 17 May 2013, aged 63, in Melbourne. She relocated to Melbourne in 2011 to care for her elderly parents, but kept her diagnosis private while her father was still alive.

She never married, and was survived by her three sisters. The Daily Telegraph featured an article on Hackforth-Jones in its history section on 21 May.

== Filmography ==
=== Film ===
Year	Title	Role	Notes
1973	Libido	Nun (segment "The Priest")	Feature film
1973	Alvin Purple	Liz Sort	Feature film
1974	Alvin Rides Again	Woman Cricketer	Feature film
1974	The Wanderer		Short film
1975	Down the Wind	Sara	Feature film
1979	The Journalist	Gillie Griffiths	Feature film
1982	Running On Empty	Dave	Feature film
1982	Last Breakfast in Paradise (aka Happy Endings)	Angela Jones	Short film
1983	Hardy Wilson – A Living Memory	Narrator	Film documentary
1985	Don't Call Me Girlie	Narrator	Film documentary
1986	That's Democracy	Narrator	Film documentary
1989	Kokoda Crescent	Carol	Feature film
1991	People First		Film documentary
1993	For Whose Sake?		Short film
1993	The Door	Mother	Short film
1994	Muriel's Wedding	Bridal Manageress #2	Feature film
1997	Diana & Me	Pollock	Feature film
1997	Paradise Road	Mrs. Pike	Feature film
1998	Kissing Katie Sandstrom		Short film
2000	Black and White	Mrs. Aston	Feature film
2003	Why We Ponder	Mother	Short film
2005	Barely Visible		Short film
2006	Reasons Beyond Me	Jone	Short film
2008	Bitter & Twisted	Jackie Samvini	Feature film
2009	Mao's Last Dancer	Cynthia Dodds	Feature film
2010	The Tree	Mrs Johnson	Feature film
2010	Purple Flowers	Grandmother	Short film
2013	We've All Been There	Joan	Short film

=== Television ===
Title	Year	Role	Type
1968	Contrabandits		1 episode
1969	Riptide	Sally Tennant / Dancer	2 episodes
1971	Man from Property		TV pilot
1971–1974	Division 4	Jo / Gwen / Sue Weston	3 episodes
1971–1974	Matlock Police	Kath Murphy / Amy Fielding / Holly Evans / Anne / Sue Mathews / Christine Miller	6 episodes
1972	The Cousin from Fiji		TV movie
1972	Number 96	Noelene Sutcliffe	3 episodes
1972	A Time for Love		Episode: "Next Time Will Be Better"
1972–1974	Homicide	Senior Constable Jill Cregan / Sharon Smith / Anne Kelly / Vicky Hill	4 episodes
1972–1974	Bellbird	Ginny Campbell	349 episodes
1973	The Wicked City		TV movie
1973	Behind the Legend	Helena Rubinstein	1 episode
1973	Ryan	Jana / Helen	2 episodes
1974	Three Men of the City	Jeannie Martin	Miniseries, 1 episode
1975	Cash and Company	Jessica Johnson	13 episodes
1976	The Emigrants	June Parker	4 episodes
1976	Tandarra	Jessica Johnson	13 episodes
1977	Young Ramsay	Emma Carroll	1 episode
1977	A Woman in the House		TV movie
1977	Image of Death	Maureen	TV movie
1977	End of Summer		Teleplay
1978	Tickled Pink	Marilyn Miller	Episode: "One Day Miller"
1978–1981	Cop Shop	Sgt. Joan Dawson / Ann Connors / Jackie Warren / Jennifer Treloar	7 episodes
1979	One Day Miller	Marilyn Miller	7 episodes
1979	Skyways	Lady Pamela Griff	1 episode
1979	The Young Doctors	Lois Norton	
1979	Patrol Boat		1 episode
1981	Bellamy	Inez	Episode: "The Fizz"
1981	Holiday Island	Dellie Kramer	2 episodes
1981	Punishment	Heather Rogers	1 episode
1981	The Sullivans		
1983; 1993	A Country Practice	Pam Foley / Martha Lynch / Cassandra James	19 episodes
1984	The Old Curiosity Shop	Voice	Animated TV movie
1985	Time's Raging	Jane	TV movie
1985–1987	Butterfly Island	Mary Travers / Mary	30 episodes
1986	Mother and Son	Community Medical Officer Joan	1 episode
1987; 1989	Rafferty's Rules	Sinclair / Danielle	2 episodes
1988	After Marcuse	Gillian	TV movie
1989	Bodysurfer	Angela Lang	Miniseries, 2 episodes
1989	Tanamera - Lion of Singapore	Mama Jack	Miniseries, 7 episodes
1989	Dolphin Cove		1 episode
1989; 1994	G.P.	Adele de Beer / Mrs. Barton	2 episodes
1990	More Winners: Boy Soldiers	Elizabeth Barnes	TV movie
1990	Embassy		1 episode
1991	Hey Dad..!	Kate Eastwood	1 episode
1991	Hampton Court	Mrs. Barrett	1 episode
1991	Golden Fiddles	Mrs. Craig	Miniseries, 2 episodes
1992	Boney	Eve	1 episode
1993	Irresistible Force	Lieutenant Governor	TV movie (US)
1993	Butterfly Island	Mary Travers	TV movie
1997	Murder Call	Ena Booth	Episode: "Ashes to Ashes"
1997	The Adventures of Sam	The Dragon Empress (voice)	Animated series, 1 episode
1999–2003	All Saints	Dr. Nicola Hartley / Elise Fletcher	11 episodes
2002	Heroes' Mountain	Annette Diver	TV movie
2003	Grass Roots	Lani Leonard	1 episode
2006	Headland	Judge Hildegarde Rosedale	2 episodes
2007	Chandon Pictures	Helen	3 episodes
2009	:30 Seconds	Pat Evans	1 episode
2012	Miss Fisher's Murder Mysteries	Reverend Mother	1 episode
2012	Conspiracy 365	Sister Jerome	1 episode
2013	The Doctor Blake Mysteries	Nell Clasby	2 episodes
2013	Paper Giants: Magazine Wars	Camilla Parker-Bowles (voice recording)	Miniseries, 1 episode

=== Television (as self) ===
Title	Year	Role	Type
1973	Inside Alvin Purple	Herself	TV special
1984	Earthwatch	Herself	Episode: "Natives on Trial"
1992	English at Work	Herself	

== Theatre ==
Title	Year	Role	Type
1967	The Beaux' Stratagem		UNSW, Sydney
1967	Camino Real	Lady Mulligan	UNSW, Sydney
1967	The Insect Play	Philanthropis	UNSW, Sydney
1967	The Fire on the Snow	Washerwoman	UNSW, Sydney
1967	Alfie	Gilda	Jane St Theatre, Sydney
1967	Play	Woman Two	Jane St Theatre, Sydney
1968	A Midsummer Night's Dream	Queen Hippolyta / Queen Titania	Old Tote Theatre, Sydney
1968	The Matchmaker	Miss Flora Van Huyse	Old Tote Theatre, Sydney
1968	The Beaux' Stratagem	Dorinda	Old Tote Theatre, Sydney
	Tom Jones	Sophy	Playhouse, Perth
1969	A Streetcar Named Desire	Negro Woman	Playhouse, Perth
1969	The Importance of Being Earnest	Cecily Cardew	Playhouse, Perth
1969	Vanity Fair	Amelia Sedley	Playhouse, Perth
1969	The House on the Cliff		Playhouse, Perth
1969	The Audition	Miss Roberts	Playhouse, Perth
1969	The Man Most Likely To	Shirley Hughes	Playhouse, Perth
1969	Lord Arthur Savile’s Crime		Playhouse, Perth
1969	Out of the Crocodile		Playhouse, Perth
1969	Love Locked Out		Playhouse, Perth
1970	The Guardsman		Playhouse, Perth, Old Tote Theatre, Sydney
1971	The Real Inspector Hound		Theatre Royal, Hobart
1971	The Audition		Theatre Royal, Hobart
1971	The Bandwagon	Lorraine Roach	Theatre Royal, Hobart, Princess Theatre, Launceston
1971	The Legend of King O'Malley	Assistant Stage Manager	Phillip Theatre, Sydney
1976	Martello Towers		St Martins Theatre, Melbourne

== Radio ==
Title	Year	Role	Type
1979	Kookaburra	Kath Palmer	ABC Radio

== Awards and nominations ==
Year	Nominated work	Award	Category	Result	Ref
1976	Tandarra	Penguin Awards	Best Actress in a Television Series	Won	
1976	Tandarra	Sammy Awards	Best Actress in a Television Series	Won	
1990	Kokoda Crescent	Australian Film Institute Awards	Best Actress in a Supporting Role	Nominated	
