= David Bilcock =

David Bilcock (6 December 1937 – 4 July 2009) was an Australian producer and editor who was an important player in the re-emergence of the Australian film industry in the late 1960s and early 1970s. He was a close collaborator with Robin Copping and Tim Burstall and helped set up Hexagon Productions.
