= Hexagon Productions =

Australian film production company

Hexagon Productions was an Australian film production company established in 1972 by Roadshow Distributors with Tim Burstall and Associates and the company Bilcock and Copping. All parties had successfully collaborated on Stork (1971) and wanted to engage in further production. The company was owned along the following lines:

- Burstall - 25%
- Bilcock and Copping - 25%
- Village Roadshow - 50%

The production side would have veto on production decisions, the distribution side would have a veto on distribution decisions, and all would have a say in what projects they would do. Initially Alan Finney represented Roadshow on the Hexagon board.

In the 1970s Hexagon were the most successful filmmaking company in Australia. They made a profit of $940,000 from Alvin Purple. Bilcock and Copping left Hexagon prior to making Eliza Fraser.

In July 1978 the company reported a loss of almost $300,000 down from a loss of $580 the year before.

== Select Credits ==
- Alvin Purple (1973)
- Inside Alvin Purple (1973) (TV)
- Alvin Rides Again (1974)
- Petersen (1974)
- Australia After Dark (1975)
- The Love Epidemic (1975)
- End Play (1975)
- Eliza Fraser (1975)
- High Rolling (1977)
- The Last of the Knucklemen (1979)

== See also ==
- List of film production companies
- List of television production companies
