= Power Without Glory =

1950 novel by Frank Hardy

- First edition
- Author: Frank J. Hardy
- Language: English
- Genre: Thriller, novel
- Publisher: Realist Printing & Publishing Co
- Publication date: 1950
- Publication place: Australia
- Media type: Print (Hardback & Paperback)
- Pages: 669 pp
- ISBN: 0-09-184206-9
- OCLC: 47707257

Power Without Glory is a 1950 historical novel written by Australian author Frank Hardy, following the life and ambitions of John West, a politician born into a working-class family, who rises to prominence in Australian federal politics.

Following the novel's publication, Ellen Wren, the wife of bookmaker and businessman John Wren, sued Hardy for criminal libel, claiming that the characters of John West and his wife Nellie were modelled on the Wrens, and that Nellie's affair in the novel was libellous to Ellen Wren. Ultimately, Hardy was cleared and publication allowed.

== Publication ==
The work was originally self-published, with illustrations by "Amb" Dyson, a friend of Hardy, with the subtitle "a novel in three parts by Frank J. Hardy, Ross Franklyn". "Ross Franklyn" was the pseudonym Hardy had always used prior to Power Without Glory. This combination of real name and pen name was also used in Hardy's 1961 book The Hard Way, which described the difficulties "Ross Franklyn" had in having the book published, and the problems Hardy faced in answering the criminal libel charge against him arising from the publication.

Hardy was a member of the Communist Party of Australia, which featured in the novel as the enemy of the protagonist; and the work was completed whilst at Camp Eureka in 1949. After the novel's publication, Hardy unsuccessfully ran for office as a member of the Communist Party.

Hardy wrote in his later work, The Hard Way, that he felt dissatisfied with the final chapters of the novel. In his desire to complete the long work at a manageable length for publication, and with the threats regarding the novel's publication, Hardy felt the final chapters were hurried.

The publication of Power Without Glory and its success was credited as being linked to the creation of the Australasian Book Society, which Hardy was key to founding.

== Plot ==
Power Without Glory follows the life of John West, who is born into an impoverished family in the fictitious Melbourne suburb of Carringbush, which is based on the suburbs of Abbotsford and Collingwood. When the novel opens, in 1893, West is twenty-four years old and already involved in criminal activities including gambling and bookmaking. The novel follows West's life as he rises to be a highly ambitious businessman and corrupt politician, as a powerbroker for the Australian Labor Party.

The novel is partly set during World War I, and the debate about conscription is a major issue in the novel. West is a fierce patriot who supports conscription, and his sometimes fiery arguments with the Irish-Catholic Archbishop of Melbourne, who opposes conscription on the grounds that to send men to aid England was contrary to his, and Ireland's, historical enmity with that country.

West's family dramas are many: his brother Arthur spends time in jail for aiding and abetting a crime of rape, West's wife Nellie has an affair with a tradesman and falls pregnant with his child, and his daughter becomes a member of the Communist Party of Australia in the years after the War.

West's relationship with Communism is a hateful one, and he heavily finances the efforts of the (real life) anti-communist, Roman Catholic B. A. Santamaria. This crusade damages both his family fortunes and his marriage, and continues until West's death as an old man in 1950.

== Characters ==
The novel can be considered a Roman à clef, or a novel in which many of the characters correlate with real-life figures of the time, including Victorian Premier Sir Thomas Bent and Prime Minister James Scullin.

The following list attempts to align Power Without Glory characters with real historical persons who may have been inspirational to the author. Recognisable features do not necessarily imply any attempt at an exact correlation. Hardy himself conceded or even affirmed some such correlations, but stated in The Hard Way that many such lists were being created and passed around by parties without his involvement, perhaps even without his knowledge.

Novel character		Real-life person		Notes
Family name	First name	Possible correlation	Occupation	Notes
Ashton	Frank	Frank Anstey	Labor politician and social propagandist	
Bacon	Snowy	Reginald Leslie (Snowy) Baker	fight promoter, sportsman, actor, soldier, and journalist ('versatile')	
Bennett	The Gentleman Thief	Hon. W.J. Beckett	MLC for Melbourne North, Melbourne East & Melbourne	
Blackwell	Maurice	Maurice Blackburn	State Labor MP for Essendon, Fitzroy & Clifton Hill; Federal Labor MP for Bourke	
Blaire		Sir Thomas Blamey	Army general and Victorian Police Commissioner, 1925–1936	
Bond	Thomas	Sir Thomas Bent	32nd Premier of Victoria, 1904–1909	
Bradley	Richard	Richard Buckley	A notorious gunman and murderer	
Brady	William	Bill Barry	State Labor MP for Carlton; minister in various Cain Governments	
Callinan	Police Commissioner	Thomas O'Callaghan	Victorian Police Commissioner, 1902–1913	
Cameron		Campbell	Cycling promoter exhibition	
Carr	John	John Cain	Leader of Victorian Labor Party; Premier on three occasions	
Conn	Archbishop	Thomas Carr	Catholic Archbishop of Melbourne, 1886–1917	
Cregan	J.	Jack Cremean	Federal Labor MP for Hoddle	
Cutting	Slasher	John "Snowy" Cutmore	Gunman and thief	
Darby	Lou	Les Darcy	Boxer	
Davison	Alfie	Sir Albert Dunstan	Conservative Victorian Premier, 1935–1943	
Devlin	Dr	Sir Hugh Devine		
Dwyer	Godfrey	Sir Gilbert Dyett	Long-serving President of the Returned and Services League of Australia	
Gardside	David	David Gaunson	Prominent criminal barrister	
Gibbon	Sir S.	Sir Samuel Gillott	, Chief Secretary in the Bent Cabinet	
Horan	Ned	Ned Hogan	Labor Premier of Victoria on two occasions	
Joggins	Rev.	Reverend G. Judkins	A prominent anti-vice crusader; preacher	
Jolly	Bob	Bob Solly	State Labor MP for Carlton	
Kelleher	Paddy	Pat Kennelly	MLC for Melbourne West; Federal Labor Secretary	
Kiely	Michael	Standish Michael Keon	State MP for Richmond; later Federal MP for Yarra	
Lamb	Richard	Dick Lean	Manager of Melbourne Stadium	
Lambert	Percy	Percy Laidler	Theatrical supplier of 201 Bourke St; prominent socialist	
Lammence	Frank	Frank Laurence		
Lane		Jack Lang	NSW Labor leader; Premier of New South Wales	
Lassiter	family	Loughnan family		
Levy	Ben	Ben Nathan	Founder of Maples Store	
McCorkell		William McCormack	Labor Premier of Queensland	
Malone	Daniel	Dr. Daniel Mannix	Catholic Archbishop of Melbourne, 1917–1963	
Manson	"Plugger" Pete	"Plugger" Bill Martin	Cyclist	
Morton	Fim	Jim Morley	Communist organiser; journalist with the Morning Post	
Murkett	Kenneth	Sir Keith Murdoch	Journalist and newspaper proprietor	
O'Flaherty	Dave	Detective O'Donnell	Chief of Gaming Squad, Victoria Police	
Parelli		Pellegrini		
Parker	Clive	Clyde Palmer	Journalist with The Truth newspaper	
Piggy		Piggy Ryan, alias Williamson	A gunman and standover man	
Real	T. J.	T. J. Ryan	Premier of Queensland	
Redmond	Ron	Ron Richards	Aboriginal boxer	
Renfrey	Sugar	Robert "Sugar" Roberts	Mayor of Collingwood	
Robinson	Barney	Barney Reynolds		
Sandow		Ad Santel	A champion wrestler	
Scatt	Bob	Bob Solly		
Solomon	Sol	Sol. Green	A big bookmaker	
Squeers	Bill	Bill Squires	A boxer	
Summer	James	James Scullin	Labor MP; Prime Minister, 1929–1932	
Swinton		Sir George Swinburne	An engineer, politician and philanthropist	
Tanner	Snoopy	Squizzy Taylor	A gunman and thief	
Thurgood		"Red Ted" Theodore	Labor Premier of Queensland; 1919–1925, Federal Treasurer; mining and business magnate	
Tinn	Ted	Ted Thye	Bogus champion wrestler	
Trumblewood	Thomas	Tom Tunnecliffe	Labor MP for Collingwood; Speaker, 1937–1940	
Watty	Jim	Jack Welsh	Secretary, Milk Distribution Association	
West	family	Wren family		
Williams	Detective	Harry Herbert Wilson	A detective with Victoria Police	
Wodman	Paddy	Paddy Boardman		

=== Locations ===
Novel location	Real-life location	Notes
Apsom	Epsom Racecourse, Mordialloc	
Bagville Street	Sackville Street, Collingwood	
Carringbush	Collingwood	
Chirraboo	Chillagoe, Queensland	
Jackson Street	Johnston Street, Fitzroy and Collingwood	
Ralstone	Richmond	(Note: There has been a Ralston St in South Yarra, across the river from Richmond, since 1857.)
Richton	Richmond Racecourse	
Royal Oak Hotel	Royal Mail Hotel	
Silver Street	Gold Street, Collingwood	

== Court case ==
Hardy was tried for criminal libel in 1951 on the basis of the depiction in the novel of West's wife having an affair but he was acquitted by jury, after putting a number of arguments and cross-examining witnesses. It was the last prosecution for criminal (as opposed to civil) libel in Victoria.

The case attracted enormous publicity, coinciding as it did with the anti-Communist referendum and served mainly to give the novel and any negative portrayal of Wren greater prominence. Hardy readily conceded that he had published the work, and so the defense was built on the remaining two points, of whether the informant Ellen Wren was in fact identical with the character Nellie West, and if so, whether in fact the publication was defamatory.

Witnesses had testified that they recognized Ellen in the character of Nellie, and that she had been defamed. Hardy's successful defense, as described in The Hard Way, argued that while the character of John West had character traits of John Wren, he was also an amalgam of ideas, with many events in the story not correlating to Wren's life. Hardy argued that if John Wren was not solely based on John West, then the character's wife could not solely be based on Ellen Wren. Hardy was acquitted of all charges, and the novel was published to a wider audience than its initial publication.

Historians have debated whether Ellen Wren did actually have an affair and conceive an illegitimate son, as in the novel. In The Hard Way, Hardy denied ever having spoken to any member of the Wren family during his extensive research for the book, claiming the affair was entirely fictional. However, in 2005, Monash University academic Jenny Hocking claimed to have discovered archival material supporting the argument that Ellen Wren did indeed have an affair with a tradesperson, and that Hardy may have had knowledge of the affair.

== TV series adaptation ==
In 1976, the novel was made into a 26-episode ABC-TV series starring Martin Vaughan as West. While Nellie's affair with the brickie is depicted, the affair does not produce a child. The series won numerous Logie, Penguin and Sammy Awards.

=== Cast ===
- Martin Vaughan as John West
- Wendy Hughes as Mary West
- Terence Donovan as Frank Lammence
- Rosalind Speirs as Nellie Moran / Nellie West
- George Mallaby as Barney Robinson
- Rowena Wallace as Harriet Marshall
- Patsy King as Vera Maguire
- Leila Hayes as Florrie Robinson
- Gus Mercurio as Sparring Partner / Bill Timms
- Graham Kennedy as Clive Parker
- Frank Wilson as Tom Trumbleward
- Tony Bonner as Brendan West
- Vivean Gray as Jane
- Brian Blain as Peter Wells
- Ken Wayne as Ted Thurgood
- Reg Gorman as Priest
- Norman Kaye as Ned Horan / Prosecuting Sergeant
- Sean Scully as Eddie Corrigan
- Jonathan Hardy as Paddy Kelleher / Rev. Joggins
- Peter Cummins as Detective Sergeant O'Flaherty
- Graeme Blundell as Snoopy Tanner
- Terry Norris as Ron Lassiter
- Elspeth Ballantyne as Dorothy Wells
- Sue Jones as Bridget
- Tristan Rogers
- Fay Kelton

== Other books ==
Hardy wrote several books examining his experiences arising from writing Power Without Glory, including The Hard Way: The Story Behind Power without Glory (1961), Who Shot George Kirkland?: A Novel About the Nature of Truth (1981), and But the Dead are Many: A Novel in Fugue Form (1975). In these a central theme is the ambiguity between truth and fiction.

== See also ==
- Australian literature
