= Tandarra =

- Directed by: Russell Hagg; Simon Wincer
- Starring: Gerard Kennedy; Gus Mercurio; Penne Hackforth-Jones
- Country of origin: Australia
- Original language: English
- No. of episodes: 13

Production
- Producers: Russell Hagg; Patrick Edgeworth
- Running time: 50 minutes

Original release
- Network: Seven Network
- Release: 1976

Related
- Cash and Company

Tandarra is an Australian television series which screened on the Seven Network in Australia in 1976 and on ITV (including the London Weekend Television and Anglia regions) in the UK. It was a follow-up series to Cash and Company which screened in 1975, and it consisted of 13 one-hour episodes. Tandarra and Cash and Company were set during the Victorian gold rush period of the 1850s.

The change in format and title was necessitated by the departure of Serge Lazareff who played the title character Sam Cash in the original series Cash and Company. Two of the original characters continued in Tandarra: Joe Brady (Gus Mercurio) and Jessica Johnson (Penne Hackforth-Jones). The other main character was Ryler (Gerard Kennedy), who had been introduced in the final episode of Cash and Company. He had been a bounty hunter who was later convinced of Joe's innocence and decided to join him.

The title was taken from the name of the homestead owned by Jessica, and the series primarily dealt with the adventures of running the large farming property. The premise of the first series, namely that Joe and Sam were fugitives from the law and were being assisted by Jessica, was totally removed. No reference to the Sam Cash character was ever made in this series. The previous antagonist, the corrupt police trooper, Lieutenant Keogh (Bruce Kerr) only appeared in the first episode of Tandarra, and the character of Jessica's servant, Annie (Anne Scott-Pendlebury) only appeared in the second.

Patrick Edgeworth later said that the series was hurt by the fact the leads were no longer fugitives from the law, which reduced the tension. The series was released in Australia on DVD in May 2015 by Umbrella Entertainment.

July 20, 2025 saw the return of the Tandarra TV series to Television on Aussie Classics channel through Binge and Foxtel 7pm on Sunday nights. It had not been seen on Australian TV since its last replay on its original Channel Seven in the early 1990s.

== Cast ==
=== Main / regular ===
- Gus Mercurio as Joe Brady
- Penne Hackforth-Jones as Jessica Johnson
- Gerard Kennedy as Ryler
- Bruce Kerr as Lieutenant Keogh
- Anne Scott-Pendlebury as Annie
- Maurie Fields as Charlie Mercer
- John Orcsik as Pat Daly
- Terence Donovan as Sean Daly
- Bethany Lee

=== Guests ===
- Briony Behets as Esther Grafton (1 episode)
- Elspeth Ballantyne as Molly Martin (1 episode)
- Lyndel Rowe as Lizzy (1 episode)
- Max Gillies as Dr Roland Clancey (1 episode)
- Michael Carman as Adam Nash (1 episode)
- Norman Yemm as Taggart (1 episode)
- Peter Cummins as Elliot Bjornstrom (1 episode)
- Reg Evans as Tommy Evans (1 episode)
- Robin Ramsay as Dexter (1 episode)
- Sean Scully as Smolly (1 episode)
- Sheila Florance as Cuddy (1 episode)
- Tim Robertson as Storekeeper (1 episode)
- Val Lehman as Dinner Guest (1 episode)
- Vic Gordon as Walter Drummund (1 episode)
