= Robin Copping =

Australian cinematographer and producer (1934–2022)

- Born: 1934; Australia
- Died: August 2022 (aged 87–88)
- Occupations: Cinematographer, film producer
- Children: Martin Copping

Robin Copping (1934 – August 2022) was an Australian cinematographer and producer. He was part of the Australian New Wave, a revival of the Australian film industry in the 1960s and '70, forming notable partnerships with David Bilcock and Tim Burstall and helping form Hexagon Productions. Copping died in August 2022.
