= Matlock Police =

Australian television series

- Starring: Michael Pate; Grigor Taylor; Vic Gordon; Paul Cronin; Tom Richards; Peter Gwynne
- Country of origin: Australia
- No. of seasons: 6
- No. of episodes: 229

Production
- Running time: 60 minutes

Original release
- Network: The 0-10 Network
- Release: 1971 – 1976

Matlock Police is an Australian television police drama series made by Crawford Productions for The 0-10 Network (now known as Network 10) between 1971 and 1976. The series focused on the police station and crime in the Victorian town of Matlock and the surrounding district, and the backgrounds and personal lives of the main policemen.

== Background ==
The series was the 0-10 Network's attempt to come up with a police show to rival Homicide (shown by the 7 Network) and Division 4 (on the 9 Network). Matlock Police was different from its Melbourne-based predecessors by being set in a small country town, the fictional Matlock, Victoria (a real Matlock exists in Victoria but is much smaller than the town depicted by this series, which is loosely based on Shepparton). These programmes' introduction featured an overhead shot of a town with a divided road, thought to be of Bairnsdale in Victoria. Series writers had a reference manual giving full details of the town’s geography, amenities, social structure, etc., as well as that of the surrounding area - neighbouring towns included Wilga, Chinaman's Creek, Possum's Creek and Burrabri, and there was an offshoot of the Great Dividing Range called the Candowies. The town's colourful history included the local Aboriginal tribe (the ‘Bangerang’), the town founder (George Matlock), a gold rush, a bushranger (‘Holy’ Joe Cooper - so-called both for his theft of a shipment of holey dollars and because he was a preacher) and a town patriarchy (the Falconers). About the only landmark the Matlock district lacked for dramatic purposes was a beach.

== Broadcast history ==
The first episode was broadcast in Melbourne on 22 February 1971. Initially filmed in black and white, the series switched to colour in episode 162, "Loggerheads". Matlock Police was canceled in 1975 after 229 episodes had been produced (while the final episode is numbered 228, an earlier episode had an A suffix, making a total of 229).

== Cast ==
=== Main ===
Actor	Character	Notes
Michael Pate	Detective Sergeant (later Detective Senior Sergeant Vic Maddern)	Head of Matlock's C.I. (Criminal Investigation) Branch, who grew up in the Matlock district and is an accomplished bushman and career cop (apart from a spell in the army where he fought in Korea). Aged in his forties, Maddern is divorced and has two children (his wife Kay is moving out in the first episodes). Dedicated, with an authoritative personality and a direct approach to his work, Maddern is well respected in the town. Maddern is eventually shot and severely wounded in mountainous bushland while pursuing small-time cattle-duffers and is evacuated to Melbourne for treatment (episode 192, "Have A Good Weekend"). Dialogue in later episodes indicates that he is recovering from his wounds, but will probably be transferred to a Melbourne squad once out of hospital.
Grigor Taylor	Senior Detective Alan Curtis	Aged in his mid-20s, who has just arrived in Matlock from Melbourne and is essentially a city boy, sent to his first country posting against his will. Curtis eventually adapts to country life, and his character and abilities develop as he becomes more experienced in his new situation. He is eventually promoted to Detective Sergeant and transferred back to Melbourne (episode 99, "Dingo Hunter").
Vic Gordon	Sergeant (later Senior Sergeant) Bert Kennedy	Head of the Uniform Branch, an Englishman who migrated to Australia in 1950. Kennedy is thorough but also easy-going with a good sense of humour. Married to Nell (Natalie Raine), who is a very good cook, Kennedy enjoys the country life in Matlock so much that he has knocked back promotion to avoid moving to Melbourne.
Paul Cronin	Senior Constable Gary Hogan	Aged about 30, a friendly, easy-going person who grew up in the country, and is always willing to help in whatever work is going, who performs a wide variety of duties but usually works as a highway patrolman. His motorcycle is equipped with a radio (callsign 'Solo One') - a rare case of dramatic licence by Crawfords (normally very faithful to police procedure), as police motorbikes at the time were not equipped with radios. The character also made an impact in another way, making motorcycle cops far more acceptable to the Australian public, which had previously seen them as "heavies and storm-trooper types". According to series producer Ian Jones, as a result men were applying to join the police so they could be a motorcycle cop like Gary Hogan. In the final episode, "The Curse of the Bangarang Prince", Hogan is notified of a posting to the town of Emerald - the setting for his spinoff series Solo One.
Tom Richards	Senior Detective Steve York	A young detective transferred to Matlock to replace Curtis (episode 100, "Bedlam"), who is a bit unorthodox, a bit headstrong, and a bit of a rebel and ladies' man.
Peter Gwynne	Detective Sergeant Jack Maloney	Transferred to Matlock from another country town to replace Maddern as head of the C.I. Branch (episode 196, "Welcome To Matlock"). In his mid-forties, married to a much younger wife and with two young children, Maloney is a friendly person with a warm personality, a dry sense of humour, a pilot's license and a sympathetic streak who comes down hard on criminals when necessary.

=== Guests ===
A notable guest star was George Lazenby who appeared in a 1974 episode "In the Name of the Queen" (inspired by the case of Ronnie Biggs and the Great Train Robbery). Other noted Australian actors who made early appearances on the series include Andrew McFarlane, Bruce Spence, Jack Thompson, Robert McDarra, Judy Morris, Diane Craig, Briony Behets, Penne Hackforth-Jones, Wendy Hughes, Sigrid Thornton, Syd Heylen, Shane Porteous, John Waters, John Wood, Ian Smith, Anne Haddy, Tom Oliver, Ken James, Tony Bonner, Maurie Fields, Lucky Grills, Moya O'Sullivan, Val Jellay, Patsy King, Max Cullen, John Jarratt, Noni Hazlehurst, Elspeth Ballantyne, Anne Charleston, Frank Wilson, Tina Bursill, Ray Meagher and Brian Wenzel. Don Barker, Gary Day, Dennis Grosvenor and John Stanton all appeared before they were cast as main characters on Homicide. After the sudden death of character actor Stewart Ginn in September 1971, Hector Crawford praised his performance in the episode titled "The Word is Progress" as one of the finest dramatic performances to come out of the Crawfords company.

== Featured vehicles ==
Vehicles featured through the series included the HG Holden Monaro (base model), which featured until Crawford's contract with Chrysler Australia commenced, with a Holden Kingswood wagon also being featured as the station's general purpose vehicle. The Monaro and Kingswood were followed by VH and VJ Valiant Ranger models. A short wheelbase FJ40 Toyota Land-cruiser also featured. Gary Hogan rode a HONDA CB750 motorcycle for most of the series, which replaced a BMW R75 used in earlier episodes.

During the filming of a pursuit-sequence for episode 36 ("End Of The Road") in August 1971, a police vehicle driven by a principal actor struck and instantly killed a 21 year-old member of the camera crew, Colin Enor (or Ennor/Ennoh) after losing control while negotiating a gravel bend. The other crew managed to get out of the way.

== DVD release ==
Crawford has released Matlock Police in 26-episode, 7-disc box sets; this resulted in a 9-volume collection for the full series.

== See also ==
- Solo One: After Matlock Police ended, the character of Gary Hogan (Paul Cronin) was spun off into a new series about a motorcycle policeman in a small country town. Crawfords have also released the series on DVD.
