= Division 4 =

Television series

- Genre: police drama
- Based on: Similar to Homicide
- Starring: Gerard Kennedy; Ted Hamilton; Terence Donovan; John Stanton; Andrew McFarlane; Frank Taylor; Chuck Faulkner; Patricia Smith
- Country of origin: Australia
- Original language: English
- No. of seasons: 7
- No. of episodes: 301

Production
- Production locations: Melbourne, Victoria
- Running time: 60 minutes
- Production company: Crawford Productions

Original release
- Network: Nine Network
- Release: 11 March 1969 – 25 November 1975

Division 4 is an Australian television police drama series broadcast by the Nine Network and created by Crawford Productions airing between 1969 and 1975 for 301 episodes.

== Synopsis ==
Division 4 was one of the first successful Australian-made television dramas, along with Homicide, also from Crawford Productions. It dealt with the wide variety of cases investigated by police in the fictional Melbourne suburb of Yarra Central (modelled on St Kilda but with many features in common with Port Melbourne and South Melbourne). Initial publicity suggested that the 'emphasis throughout is on realism'.

Division 4 was more concerned with character motivation than Homicide. The first episode included a human interest story for Frank Banner, played by Gerard Kennedy, whose pregnant wife Joy (played by Kate McKittrick) dies in part due to harassment from criminals pursuing a vendetta against him. This situation was recalled in Episode 20, 'The Threat', and in other early episodes in which Banner is seen to be haunted and troubled. In episode 29, 'The Price', an old flame of Banner's, June Anderson (Margaret Dunbar) attempts to rekindle the relationship they had before he met and married Joy, with no success: his job is too demanding.

== Awards ==
The series won 10 Logie Awards, including two Gold Logies (for Australia's most popular entertainer) for Gerard Kennedy, who played Frank Banner.

It was also critically acclaimed, winning a number of AWGIE Awards and Penguin Awards for its scripts and actors. In 1972 Frank Taylor received the Penguin Award for the Best Supporting Actor in a Television Series.

After Kennedy decided to leave Division 4, the Nine Network summarily cancelled the series; only one episode was made with his replacement John Stanton.

== Theme music ==
The opening library music theme Power Drive was composed by Johnny Pearson in 1967. Different versions of the same music were used across the series.

The theme was sampled by TISM in their 1998 single Thunderbirds Are Coming Out.

== Cast ==
=== Regular cast ===
- Gerard Kennedy as Sen. Det./Det. Sgt. Frank Banner – In accordance with real-life changes to the Victoria Police, Banner was promoted to Detective Sergeant and Vickers to Detective Senior Sergeant as these changes occurred. A hard, tough man who has become a loner after his pregnant wife, Joy, died during premature child-birth brought on after being terrorised by a criminal (in the first episode, "The Soldiers"); as a result, he tends to bury himself in his work. He respects but sometimes disagrees with his superior, Sergeant Vickers, and although sometimes using roughhouse methods of handling criminals is both a fair man and a conscientious cop. Banner eventually falls in love with and marries an old friend, Jenny Franklin, and in the second-last episode resigns from the Victoria Police for an extended honeymoon and to find a 'safer' occupation.
- Chuck Faulkner as Det. Sgt./Det. Snr. Sgt. Keith Vickers – Head of the Yarra Central CIB, married with two sons. He often clashes with his younger son Jamie, a university student, over anti-Vietnam demonstrations. His bark is usually worse than his bite, and although he comes across as a very serious person most of the time, he has a dry sense of humour which lends itself to some nice comedy touches.
- Terence Donovan as Sen. Det. Mick Peters – The station's third plain-clothes man. Peters has a happy-go-lucky nature and an eye for the ladies. He has a good record with the Victoria Police, although Vickers sometimes has to pull him into line for being too much of a comedian.
- Frank Taylor as Sgt. Andrew "Scotty" MacLeod – Head of Yarra Central's Uniform Branch. A meticulous man originally from Scotland (hence his nickname "Scotty"), he is married with four daughters (one of whom is kidnapped by a former adversary in episode 214, "Backlash"). Scotty's role is mainly confined to the station charge counter, and he therefore rarely appears in exterior scenes (allowing actor Frank Taylor to live in Sydney and commute to Melbourne for three days of filming a week).
- Ted Hamilton as Const. Kevin Dwyer – An ambitious and dedicated cop who is always eager to work with the CIB. Hamilton was sacked from the series for breach of contract (he had filmed a commercial without permission from Crawfords) in September 1973, during the filming of an episode. Frantic script rewrites solved the problem of Dwyer's sudden disappearance by explaining that the character had been accepted for a position in the CIB and transferred out of Yarra Central to commence his detective training (noted in episode 225, "All For One"). Because of Hamilton's abrupt departure from the series (and the resulting production disruptions), Dwyer makes several other onscreen appearances until episode 231, but his final full appearance is in episode 229, "Mad About The Boy".
- Patricia Smith as WPC Margaret Stewart – Stewart lives with her mother, is a fairly conservative person, but is keenly interested in the reform of criminals, and is friendly with and has great respect for Banner. Like Scotty MacLeod, the role of Stewart was usually a static one, allowing Patricia Smith to commute from Adelaide to Melbourne for filming. Stewart resigns from the force to get married in episode 238, "None So Blind".
- Andrew McFarlane as Constable Roger Wilson – Becomes a recurring character from episode 235, "Maria". A new recruit to the police force (and a bit of a bungler at first), Yarra Central is Wilson's first posting, and he develops from a green newcomer to a competent constable who soon settles down. This was McFarlane's breakout role, which later led to his being cast in The Sullivans as series heartthrob John Sullivan. In episode 289, "Tell Me Your Troubles My Friend", Wilson receives a transfer to a country posting at Mansfield.
- Clive Davies as Constable Bob Parry – Davies had appeared in one episode early in 1974. Parry became a recurring character from episode 237, "Goodbye Charlie", screened 20 May 1974. Parry featured in 48 episodes between 1974 and 1975.
- John Hannan as Constable Paul Gray – Becomes a recurring character from episode 274, "A Sense of Duty (Part 1)". Gray was an important element in many episodes in 1975 but first had a major storyline in the episode 'Just for Kicks' when the brother of his girlfriend, Jan (Noni Hazlehurst), was involved in the theft of a car and a rifle. Gray featured in 36 episodes in the final year of the program.
- Rowena Wallace as WPC Jane Bell – A rising star in the force, Jane Bell appears in ten episodes beginning with 'Hello Stranger' on the 5 August 1974. The character is given little background; she is a newcomer to police work and occasionally overly idealistic. As a WPC she, like Margaret Stewart before her, is tasked with interviewing and counselling female suspects. Wallace had appeared in five different roles in Division 4 before taking the role of Jane Bell in the show's final months.
- John Stanton as Det. Tom Morgan – Frank Banner's replacement, a country cop transferred from Bairnsdale to Yarra Central. Morgan appears only in the final episode of Division 4, the Nine Network having cancelled the series after Kennedy left the show.

=== Other notable cast members ===
Filmmaker Nadia Tass had her first acting role, aged 14, in Division 4.

== Home media ==
As of February 2017, twelve volumes of this series have been released on DVD through Crawfords/WinTV, representing the entire series run (with the exception of episode 102A "Conspiracy", which exists as a partial episode only and was not included).

Title	Episodes #	Discs	Region 4 (Australia)	Special features	Distributors
Division 4 (Volume 1)	Series 1, Episodes 1-26	7		TBA	Crawford Productions
Division 4 (Volume 2)	Series 1, Episodes 27–37 Series 2, Episodes 1–16	7		TBA	Crawford Productions
Division 4 (Volume 3)	Series 2, Episodes 17–43	7		TBA	Crawford Productions
Division 4 (Volume 4)	Series 2, Episodes 44–50 Series 3, Episodes 1–19	7		TBA	Crawford Productions
Division 4 (Volume 5)	Series 3, Episodes 20–36 Series 4, Episodes 1–9	7		TBA	Crawford Productions
Division 4 (Volume 6)	Series 4, Episodes 10–36	7		TBA	Crawford Productions
Division 4 (Volume 7)	Series 4, Episodes 37–38 Series 5, Episodes 1-24	7		TBA	Crawford Productions
Division 4 (Volume 8)	Series 5, Episodes 25–51	7		TBA	Crawford Productions
Division 4 (Volume 9)	Series 6, Episodes 1-26	7		TBA	Crawford Productions
Division 4 (Volume 10)	Series 6, Episodes 27–48	7		TBA	Crawford Productions
Division 4 (Volume 11)	Series 7, Episodes 1-26	7		TBA	Crawford Productions
Division 4 (Volume 12 - Final Volume)	Series 7, Episodes 27–41	7		Trailers	Crawford Productions
