= John Stanton (actor) =

Australian actor

- Born: 28 October 1944 (age 82); Brisbane, Queensland, Australia
- Occupation: Actor
- Years active: 1966–present
- Spouse: Jill Forster
- Children: 1
- Relatives: Peter Stanton (brother)

John Stanton (born 28 October 1944) is an Australian actor, who has appeared in many stage, television and film productions throughout his extensive sixty-year career.

== Early life ==
Stanton was born in Brisbane, Queensland. He attended Banyo State High School for his secondary education where he was a runner and swimmer. He is the brother of ecologist Peter Stanton. Despite his obvious sporting talents, Stanton was more interested in pursuing acting as a career although he also had a desire to become a veterinarian.

Stanton worked various jobs including as a school teacher and as a prawner on Moreton Bay. At the age of 24, he unsuccessfully auditioned for the National Institute of Dramatic Art.

== Stage ==
Stanton moved to Melbourne to further his career.

He played the major supporting role of Peter Handcock (to Terence Donovan's leading role of Breaker Morant) in the first public performance of Kenneth G. Ross's play Breaker Morant: A Play in Two Acts, presented by the Melbourne Theatre Company at the Athenaeum Theatre, in Melbourne on 2 February 1978. He also played many other roles on stage including the lead in Shakespeare's Macbeth.

In 1979, Stanton appeared in the Melbourne Theatre Company production of the Harold Pinter play Betrayal which was the first time the production had been staged outside the United Kingdom.

In 2013, Stanton appeared as Willy Loman in the Black Swan Theatre Company production of Death of a Salesman.

== Television ==
Stanton's early television work included a stint in the soap opera Bellbird in 1972, and various guest-starring roles in the Crawford Productions police dramas Homicide, Division 4, Matlock Police. He also acted in the miniseries Against the Wind.

Despite having made six earlier appearances as different characters in Homicide, Stanton was cast as a regular character, lead detective Pat Kelly, in 1973–1974. In his final episode, Pat Kelly engaged in a romance with a woman played by his real-life wife Jill Forster, with whom he previously appeared in an episode of Matlock Police.

After leaving Homicide, Stanton continued to make guest appearances in TV dramas, and was later signed to replace the departing Gerard Kennedy in Division 4 – however, the series was summarily cancelled upon Kennedy's leaving, and Stanton's character of Sen. Det. Tom Morgan appeared in the final episode only.

He then played the regular lead role of Nick Manning in the later years of soap opera The Box. Jill Forster at that time also played the regular role of prim secretary Enid Parker in The Box, and in the storyline Enid eventually had a one-night stand with Stanton's character. When Stanton and Forster became expectant parents in real life and Forster left The Box to have the baby, likewise Enid fell pregnant and left to have the baby, and in the story Nick was the father. When Forster returned for the show's final episode in 1977 Enid's baby was played by Stanton and Forster's real-life child.

In 1981 he played the title character of Detective Sergeant Steve Bellamy in the police series Bellamy.

He was acclaimed in his role as Malcolm Fraser in television mini-series The Dismissal, for which he was awarded a Logie Award for Best Actor in a single drama or mini-series. When Stanton was cast in The Dismissal, the producers wanted him to wear a wig and prosthetics which Stanton refused. In a 2013 interview, Stanton said: "I said 'there's no way I'm going to do that. Either I will create my own reality or I'm not going to be there at all' so I was one of the few that went without make-up." During the interview, Stanton also revealed what Fraser had said about the mini-series, recalling that he had said: "Well they got someone decent to play me - they should have got someone decent to play Whitlam", referring to the performance of Max Phipps.

During the early 1990s Stanton portrayed the character of Oliver Blackwood in the TV series The Man from Snowy River, and appeared in a recurring role as Bryce Redstaff in McLeod's Daughters from 2003 to 2007.

Stanton appeared in eight episodes of The Doctor Blake Mysteries as retired, then acting, Superintendent Douglas Ashby, from Season 1 to Season 3.

In 1997, he appeared in an episode of Blue Heelers playing the character of Dougall Frazer.

Stanton was an announcer for Australia Day Live Concert in Sydney from 2018 to 2022.

== Films ==
In addition to his stage and television work, Stanton has appeared in numerous movies with numerous film credits to his name.

In 1981, he appeared with Henri Szeps and Simone Buchanan in Run, Rebecca, Run. He starred as the bagman in the 1982 comedy film Kitty and the Bagman.

In 1983, Stanton appeared in the movie Dusty with Bill Kerr. Stanton starred in the Daryl Duke-directed 1986 adventure drama film Tai-Pan and in the 1987 Australian film Great Expectations: The Untold Story.

Stanton also appeared in Rent-a-Cop, which starred Burt Reynolds and Liza Minnelli; the film received mostly negative reviews.

== Voiceover roles ==
Stanton is known for his distinctive deep and rich voice, which has led to voiceover work.

This included being the English language announcer for the Sydney 2000 Olympic Opening Ceremony. He was also the voice on one or more television ads for the Opening Ceremony Official Album. He has also been the voice-over announcer for numerous television and radio ads, including Forty Winks bedding. He is also doing voice overs for Designer Direct. He voiced of The Brolga in the animated TV series The Silver Brumby.

He is the narrator for the 8-part TV series Australians at War, which commenced Anzac Day, 25 April 2001. He was also the narrator of the Australian commercial Grim Reaper. He has also narrated Hitler: The Final Chapter released in 1992 by Cyril Jones & Associates and released in the U.S. in 1995. He currently is an announcer for Seven News since 2020.

== Filmography ==
=== Film ===
Year	Title	Role	Type
1966	The Sensualist		Feature film
1970	3 to Go: Toula	Man in Milkbar (uncredited)	Short film
1972	I'm Damned if I Know		TV movie
1975	The Great Macarthy	Player	Feature film
1978	The Geeks	Vinnie	TV movie
1981	Run, Rebecca, Run	Bob Porter	Feature film
1982	Kitty and the Bagman	The Bagman	Feature film
1983	Dusty	Railey Jordan	Feature film
1983	Phar Lap	Eric Connolly	Feature film
1985	The Naked Country	Lance Dillon	Feature film
1986	Malcolm	Armed Guard (uncredited)	Feature film
1986	Tai-Pan	Tyler Brock	Feature film
1986	Darwin 1942: Australia's Greatest Shame	Narrator	TV movie
1987	Great Expectations: The Untold Story	Abel Magwitch	Feature film
1987	Rent-a-Cop	Alexander / Mr Big	Feature film
1988	Day of the Panther	William Anderson	Feature film
1988	Strike of the Panther	William Anderson	Feature film
1995	Vacant Possession	Frank	Feature film
1997	Reprisal	McTaggart	TV movie
1995	The Feds: Vengeance	John Dyer	TV movie
2001	Nn-1	Thug 1	TV movie
2003	Darkness Falls	Captain Henry	Feature film
2003	Virus	Dr Norton Abraxas	Short film
2010	Beneath Hill 60	General Lambert	Feature film
2010	The Julian Paradox	Julius Caesar	Film
2018	The BBQ	Herbert	Feature film
2020	Miss Fisher and the Crypt of Tears	Crippins	TV movie

=== Television ===
Year	Title	Role	Type
1971-74	Homicide	Senior Detective Pat Kelly / Jimmy Taylor / Ken Anderson / Jack Robertson / Kev Lister / Al Simmonds / NSW Constable	TV series, 55 episodes
1971-75	Division 4	Senior Detective Tom Morgan / Ray Connell / Bert Hall / Hank Van Gielens / Alex Jones / Kevin 'Knuckles' O'Brien / White / Ben	TV series, 8 episodes
1971-75	Matlock Police	Billy Delaney / Ben Cooper / Carl Reid / Jack O'Brien / Ernie Pratt / Lennie Daley / Chris Goddard / Dave Bayliss / Jimmy Smith	TV series, 9 episodes
1972	Bellbird	Leo Hill	TV series, 174 episodes
1973	Ryan	Johnson	TV series, 1 episode
1974	Certain Women	Father Michael	TV series, 3 episodes
1974	Rush	Jack Benson	TV series, 1 episode
1974-76	Silent Number	Singer / Mason	TV series, 2 episodes
1975	Armchair Cinema	Helier	TV series, 1 episode
1975-77	The Box	Nick Manning	TV series, 282 episodes
1978	Catspaw	Corrigan	TV series, 2 episodes
1978	Against the Wind	Surgeon	TV miniseries, 1 episode
1980	Celebrity Tattle Tales	Self	TV series, 1 episode
1980-81	Cop Shop	John Lewis / Les Dorsey	TV series, 3 episodes
1981	Bellamy	Detective Sergeant Steve Bellamy	TV series, 26 episodes
1983	The Dismissal	Malcolm Fraser	TV miniseries, 3 episodes
1988	Dusty		TV series, 1 episode
1989	Mission Impossible	Lord Holman	TV series, season 1, 1 episode
1989	Naked Under Capricorn	Edrington	TV miniseries, 2 episodes
1992	Hitler: The Final Chapter	Narrator	TV series
1994	Time Trax	Dr Julius Rathenberg	TV series, 1 episode
1995	Halifax f.p.	Malcolm Priest	TV series, 1 episode
1994-95	The Man from Snowy River	Oliver Blackwood	TV series, 16 episodes
1996-98	The Silver Brumby	Brolga (voice)	Animated TV series, 39 episodes
1997	Good Guys, Bad Guys	Rowntree	TV series, 1 episode
1998	Blue Heelers	Dougal Frazer	TV series, 2 episodes
2000	Sydney 2000 Olympics Opening Ceremony	Announcer	TV special
2001	Australians at War	Narrator	TV miniseries, 8 episodes
2002	MDA	Dr Jock McGeoghan	TV series, 1 episode
2003	Welcher & Welcher	Colonel	TV miniseries, 1 episode
2003	Pirate Islands	The Ghost of Captain Quade	TV series, 26 episodes
2003-07	McLeod's Daughters	Bryce Redstaff	TV series, 8 episodes
2004	Stingers	Ethan Stein	TV series, 2 episodes
2004	Through My Eyes	Roff	TV miniseries, 2 episodes
2007	Dogstar	Singo	TV series, 1 episode
2013-15	The Doctor Blake Mysteries	Superintendent Douglas Ashby	TV series, seasons 1-3, 8 episodes
2015	Childhood's End	WainrIght Senior	TV miniseries, 1 episode
2018-22	Australia Day Live Concert in Sydney	Announcer	TV specials
2019	The Commons	Arnold	TV miniseries, 1 episode
2019-20	Bloom	Max McKinnon	TV series, 6 episodes
2020	Seven News	Announcer	TV news program
2021	Jack Irish	Bill the Boatman	TV series, 1 episode
2023	The Clearing	Chancellor Hearn	TV miniseries, 1 episode
2023	Bay of Fires	Douglas	TV series, 2 episodes

== TVC ==
Year	Title	Role
	Forty Winks	Voiceover
	Designer Direct	Voiceover
1987	Grim Reaper AIDS Education campaign by the National Advisory Committee on AIDS (NACAIDS)	Narrator

== Stage ==
Year	Title	Role	Company/Location
1978	Breaker Morant: A Play in Two Acts	Breaker Morant	Melbourne Theatre Company at Athenaeum Theatre
	Macbeth	Macbeth	
1979	Betrayal		Melbourne Theatre Company
2013	Death of a Salesman	Willy Loman	Black Swan Theatre Company
