= Brooke Anderson (actress) =

Australian actor

Brooke "Mikey" Anderson
- Born: Brooke Paige Anderson; 15 August 1981 (age 44); Sydney, New South Wales, Australia
- Occupations: Actress; writer; film director; film producer; singer
- Years active: 1987–present
- Parent(s): Greg Anderson (father); Lynda Keane (mother)
- Website: http://www.brookeanderson.com

Brooke Paige "Mikey" Anderson (born 15 August 1981) is an Australian actress, who started her career as a child actress when she played the character Claire Fielding on the Australian series E Street, and has appeared in the American series Lost.

== Life and career ==
Anderson is the daughter of musician Greg Anderson and actress Lynda Keane.

Anderson was one of E Street's original cast members when the show began in 1989. She played Claire Fielding, daughter of Elly (Penny Cook; Diane Craig) and David Fielding (Noel Hodda). In 1992, when Anderson was 10 years old, producer Andrew Saw informed her mother that she was being released from her contract eight weeks early and would be written out of E Street. Saw admitted that the writers were struggling to come up with storylines for Claire and decided to rest the character. Anderson filmed her final scenes in May 1992.

After E Street, Anderson filmed a guest role in A Country Practice, and a lead role in an episode of G.P.. In 1994, Anderson released her first music record called "Step Back (Peace Not War)". The following year, she starred in the children's series Glad Rags as Lizzie Forbes. She went on to appear in Search for Treasure Island and Ocean Girl.

== Filmography ==
=== Film ===
Year	Title	Role	Notes
1989	The Punisher	Annie Castle	
1993	You and Me and Uncle Bob	Charlie	
2005	Self-Inflicted	Amy	
2005	Short Side of Nothing	Talia Baca	Video
2005	Sum of Existence	Liz Murphy	
2008	Good Chemistry	Laurie	
2009	Off the Ledge	Kat	
2010	The Perfect Host	Thief	

=== Television ===
Year	Title	Role	Notes
1987	A Country Practice	Phoebe Spencer	Episodes: "Licensed to Kill: Parts 1 & 2"
1989–1992	E Street	Clare Fielding	Main cast
1992	A Country Practice	Dee Dee Mann	Episodes: "Me and My Girl: Parts 1 & 2"
1993	G.P.	Sasha	Episode: "Pioneers"
1995	Glad Rags	Lizzie Forbes (regular role)	TV series, 13 episodes
1996	Home and Away	Hannah Williams	Recurring
1996–1997	Ocean Girl	Cassandra "Cass" Clayborn	Main cast
1998	Water Rats	Finn	Episode: "Run for the Money"
1998–2000	Search for Treasure Island	Jacqui Raymond	Main cast
2006	Happy Hour	Cute Girl	Episode: "Boo! This Party Sucks"
2006	Lost	Charlotte Malkin	Episode: "?"
2007	Where Are They Now?	Herself/guest	
2007–2008	Animalia	Alex (voice)	Main cast
