= No Roses For Michael =

No Roses for Michael
- Directed by: Chris McGill
- Written by: John Baxter
- Produced by: John Dwyer
- Starring: Brendon Lunney
- Cinematography: Donald McAlpine
- Edited by: Ian Walker
- Music by: Greg Anderson
- Release date: 1970
- Running time: 32 minutes
- Country: Australia
- Language: English

No Roses for Michael is a 1970 Australian television film. Sponsored by the National Drug Education Project, it portrays an 18-year-old boy's descent into drug addiction. Starring Brendon Lunney, it was directed by Chris McGill and written by John Baxter who researched real cases from the Langdon Clinic and the Police Drug Squad.

== Cast ==
- Brendon Lunney as Michael

== Reception ==
The Age Teletopics column said although a "little pretentious" it was "an honest and, for the most part, realistic presentation of cause and effect in drug addiction." The Sydney Morning Herald's Valda Marshall wrote that ""No Roses for Michael" is not only a remarkable film, it is a milestone in television history." The Canberra Times's Frances Kelly said it was not to be missed but noted "the film, except for the withdrawal scene, was not as hard-hitting as it could have been."

John Pinkney in the Age called it anti-drug propaganda saying it "was a lurid appeal to emotionalism whose loaded arguments would be rejected any intelligent 10-year-old." In an Australian Medical Journal article Dr. Allen A. Bartholomew also called it propaganda saying that some of his patients had started taking drugs after watching the film.

== Music ==
The theme song "No Roses for Michael", written and performed by Greg Anderson, charted in October 1970.
