= Search for Treasure Island =

Australian television series

- Written by: Jenny Sharp; Robert Loader; Hugh Stuckey; Judith Colquhoun; Jo Horsburgh; David Phillips; Karen Petersen
- Directed by: Howard Rubie; Russel Bacon; Chris Martin-Jones; Robert Klenner
- Starring: Daniel Kellie; Brittany Byrnes; Brooke "Mikey" Anderson; Jan Wachtel; Scot Swalwell; Christie Hayes
- Music by: Peter Dasent
- Country of origin: Australia
- Original language: English

Production
- Producers: Roger Mirams; Andrew Brooke

Original release
- Release: 17 August 1998 – 4 May 2000

Search for Treasure Island is an Australian TV series that aired in 1998 and 2000. It revolves around a group of people finding the mysterious Treasure Island. The protagonists encounter many cultures, factions and obstacles on the island as they try to find their parents and escape the ominous Maelstrom.

The production was handled by Grundy Television Pty Ltd, with direction by Howard Rubie and others.

== Synopsis ==
Expert yachtsman Paul Raymond disappears while searching for the legendary Treasure Island after his yacht is lost in the Maelstrom, a mysterious storm surrounding the island. A year later, his wife Sally, stepson Mark and daughter Jacqui set out to find him. After rescuing a stranded girl named Thea, their yacht is also caught in the Maelstrom, leaving the group stranded on Treasure Island, where they encounter isolated communities descended from people who became trapped on the island across different periods of history.

In the first season, the group becomes separated as they search for Paul and the legendary treasure. They encounter communities including the Merchants, the Horse Lords and the Samurai while repeatedly clashing with the enigmatic Dante in their efforts to reunite and escape the island. After reuniting, the survivors escape aboard a Royal Navy submarine and attempt to navigate through the Maelstrom.

In the second season, the submarine is wrecked in the Maelstrom, stranding the survivors on the opposite side of the island. Reunited with old allies and confronted by the Stormers, the Brotherhood and Long John Silver's pirate crew, they continue their search for the treasure while again opposing Dante. Recovering the treasure and freeing their captured companions, the group ultimately escapes Treasure Island by navigating safely through the Maelstrom.

== Cast ==
- Daniel Kellie as Mark Raymond
- Brittany Byrnes as Thea Hawkins
- Shane Briant as Dante/Tempus
- Jan Wachtel as Karl Baumann
- Scot Swalwell as Hans-Peter
- Christie Hayes as Maria
- Brooke "Mikey" Anderson as Jacqui Raymond
- Martin Vaughan as Jones
- Anna Volska as Frau Keller
- Scott McGregor as Paul Raymond
- June Salter as Mrs Silver
- Tiriel Mora as Captain Escovar
- Jacek Koman as Don Grego

== Episodes ==
=== Series overview ===
Season	Episodes	Originally released	
Season	Episodes	First released	Last released
1	12	August 17, 1998	September 3, 1998
2	14	April 11, 2000	May 4, 2000

=== Season 1 (1998) ===
No. overall	No. in season	Title	Directed by	Written by	Original release date
1	1	"The Empty Ocean"	Howard Rubie, Robert Klenner	David Phillips, Robert Loader, Karen Petersen	17 August 1998
2	2	"Shipwrecked"	Howard Rubie	David Phillips	18 August 1998
3	3	"Lost in Time"	Howard Rubie	Robert Loader	19 August 1998
4	4	"No Escape"	Robert Klenner	Karen Petersen	20 August 1998
5	5	"Bride of the Horselord"	Robert Klenner	Judith Colquhoun	24 August 1998
6	6	"The Old Ones"	Howard Rubie	Hugh Stuckey	25 August 1998
7	7	"Spyglass Hill"	Howard Rubie	Jenny Sharp	26 August 1998
8	8	"Pirate Gold"	Howard Rubie	Jo Horsburgh	27 August 1998
9	9	"Fortress of the Damned"	Howard Rubie	Chris Roache	31 August 1998
10	10	"The Mountains of Fire"	Howard Rubie	Hugh Stuckey	1 September 1998
11	11	"Dante's Lair"	Robert Klenner	David Phillips	2 September 1998
12	12	"Secret of the Stone Circle"	Robert Klenner	Robert Loader	3 September 1998

=== Season 2 (2000) ===
No. overall	No. in season	Title	Directed by	Written by	Original release date
13	1	"Ghosts and Demons"	Howard Rubie	Robert Loader	11 April 2000
14	2	"A Thief in the Night"	Howard Rubie	Karen Petersen	12 April 2000
15	3	"Stormers"	Howard Rubie	David Phillips	13 April 2000
16	4	"Thorn Birds"	Howard Rubie	Jenny Sharp	17 April 2000
17	5	"A Snake in the Grass"	Chris Martin-Jones	Robert Loader	18 April 2000
18	6	"Curse of Thunder Cove"	Chris Martin-Jones	Karen Petersen	19 April 2000
19	7	"The Brotherhood"	Howard Rubie	David Phillips	20 April 2000
20	8	"Dead Man's Chest"	Howard Rubie	Robert Loader	25 April 2000
21	9	"Pirate Treachery"	Chris Martin-Jones	Karen Petersen	26 April 2000
22	10	"Computer Games"	Chris Martin-Jones	David Phillips	27 April 2000
23	11	"Damsel in Distress"	Howard Rubie	Robert Loader	1 May 2000
24	12	"Dante in Darkness"	Howard Rubie	Karen Petersen	2 May 2000
25	13	"Flint's Curse"	Chris Martin-Jones	Karen Petersen, David Phillips	3 May 2000
26	14	"Eye of the Storm"	Chris Martin-Jones	Robert Loader	4 May 2000
