= Target (Australian TV series) =

Australian magazine style television show (1974-76)

Target is an Australian magazine style television show broadcast by the ABC. It was aimed at a youth audience and aired in an early evening time slot. It was compered at different times by David Champtaloup, Anne Stone, Bob Watson, Cathy Scott, Brendon Lunney, Kerry Cook, Jane Fennell, Julian Rocket and Mark Holden. It ran from 1 July 1974 to May 20, 1976.

== See also ==
- List of Australian music television shows
- List of Australian television series
