= List of The Doctor Blake Mysteries episodes =

The following is a list of episodes for the Australian television drama mystery programme, The Doctor Blake Mysteries. As of 5 November 2017, 44 episodes of The Doctor Blake Mysteries have aired.

== Series overview ==
Series	Episodes	Originally released		
Series	Episodes	First released	Last released	Network
1	10	1 February 2013	5 April 2013	ABC
2	10	7 February 2014	11 April 2014	ABC
3	8	13 February 2015	3 April 2015	ABC
4	8	5 February 2016	25 March 2016	ABC
5	8	17 September 2017	5 November 2017	ABC
Telemovie		12 November 2017		ABC

== Episodes ==
=== Series 1 (2013) ===
No. overall	No. in series	Title	Directed by	Written by	Original release date	AUS viewers (million)
1	1	"Still Waters"	Andrew Prowse	Stuart Page	1 February 2013	1.176 (Overnight)
2	2	"The Greater Good"	Declan Eames	Stuart Page	8 February 2013	0.935 (Overnight)
A member of hospital staff, Bert Prentice, is murdered in the morgue. Blake suspects the former morgue attendant Ron Jackson, who has vanished after he was sacked by Prentice. Jackson is a boxer, and Prentice was killed by a blow to the throat by someone's left hand. Preparations for marking Anzac Day bring Major Alderton and Sergeant Hannam into Ballarat. Lawson promises to help Alderton find a deserter, and Blake recognizes Alderton as an old acquaintance from the army. At the club, Alderton tries to persuade Blake to rejoin the intelligence service. Blake mentions that his daughter would be 23 now, and he is still seeking her and her mother. Sergeant Hobart and Danny Parks take Ron Jackson in. Mattie is not pleased to hear Jackson was beaten by the police, as she knows him and is sure he did not do the murder. Checking the morgue again, Blake and Danny find evidence of another body brought into the morgue before Prentice's death, which is now gone. Blake finds a boot print near the refrigerator in the morgue. He visits his patient Sally Clements, who had previously described symptoms that were not hers -- symptoms of radiation sickness. Blake agrees to treat her friend Jimmy and not reveal his presence to the military. Blake tells Jean that, while he may not need a housekeeper, he does need help and admits how different he is from his late father. Blake drinks with Alderton and Hannam at their hotel, while Jean searches their rooms. Back home, Blake tells Hannam, who is left-handed, how he killed Prentice while stealing the body of a man who died from radiation poisoning due to atomic tests. Jean stops Hannam from killing Blake, holding her late husband's pistol. Lawson questions Hannam about the murder, but Hannam replies only with his name, rank and serial number. Alderton appears at the police station, stating the case is now a military matter and leaving with Hannam. Blake mentions that he and Alderton were 3.5 years in the same POW camp after the fall of Singapore in the war. Parks apologises to Jackson. Jean and Lucien go out for the ANZAC Day events, with Jean wearing her husband's medals. Guest cast: Neil Pigot, Ben Anderson and Chloé Boreham; First appearance of police Sergeant Hobart, Army Major Alderton and Sergeant Hannam.
3	3	"Death of a Travelling Salesman"	Ian Barry	Stuart Page & Chelsea Cassio	15 February 2013	1.131
A car careens down the road where repairs narrow it and Constable Danny Parks is directing traffic. The car crashes and the driver is found dead. Autopsy shows that he was killed by poison. Parks returns to the car to collect the victim's possessions; among the vacuum hoses in the backseat, Parks finds a snake and is bitten by it. Doctor Blake decides that the dead man was bitten by a snake, and realizes the danger to Parks. Blake gets him to the hospital and determines it was an Asian pit viper. Antivenom is given to Parks, who recovers in hospital. The dead man, Ray, was a travelling salesman staying at a local boarding house full of salesmen. Blake finds that the owner keeps snakes in the basement, which is against the law, and his Asian pit viper tank is empty. The owner is arrested for keeping the snakes and for murder. He pines away in jail, giving Blake a clue. Jean, Mattie, Blake and Danny return to the boarding house to purchase two appliances. Two salesmen compete for their business and Blake challenges one with his actions in killing Ray. Both men, and Frank, the owner of the boardinghouse, are homosexuals. Frank fell in love with Ray when he arrived, leaving the other man behind. So he put the snake in Ray's car, and confesses to Lawson and Blake, including the challenge of living as a homosexual when it is considered unlawful. Blake does not want Lawson to charge him with more than murder, knowing there is no choice about sexuality.
4	4	"Brotherly Love"	Andrew Prowse	Stuart Page	22 February 2013	1.095
Danny and another officer arrive at Sean McBride's house, and Sergeant Bill Hobart is taking cover outdoors as Sean is screaming and waving a loaded gun; Danny wounds him in the shoulder. Inside they find a fourth police officer dead on the floor. Thirteen months later, Sean is in prison, about to be hanged for killing officer Clive Cooper. Doctor Blake is called to the prison to treat Sean for a high fever. In his fevered state, Sean says he did not kill Clive. Doctor Blake says that is the truth, not what he confessed in court. There is public protest against the hanging, and conflict between Danny and Mattie over capital punishment. Journalist Joy McDonald tries to get quotes from Blake about the situation. Sean has two brothers, a priest, Xavier, and Peter, married and a father of three children. Blake finds that Clive's wife had an affair with Sean, who is the father of her son. Blake brings Mrs Cooper and the baby to see Sean right before he is to hang and points out to Xavier that Sean is about to commit suicide -- a mortal sin. It turns out that on the day of his death, Clive learned of the affair and headed for Sean's, bringing his gun. Mrs Cooper called Hobart for aid, knowing he was nearby; but he arrived after the shooting. Peter had been playing cards with Sean and intervened when he was attacked by Clive. He hit Clive on the back of the head with a chair, but that did not slow him down. In the scuffle with Peter, Clive's gun went off, wounding him fatally. Xavier decided Sean should plead guily to the results of the fight, and no one should mention that three people were in that room. Something Blake had deduced from the presence of two types of cigarette butts. Guest cast: Daniel Daperis and Sara Gleeson; First appearance of Joy McDonald Dedication: This episode was dedicated in memory of special effects artist, Aaron Beaucaire.
5	5	"Hearts and Flowers"	Ian Barry	Stuart Page	1 March 2013	1.088
Blake is a judge for the Begonia festival in Ballarat. The other judges are Professor Ormond, Charles Griffith and Angela Waterston. That night, Ormond is murdered in his greenhouse, which was set afire. Newspaper publisher Patrick Tyneman argues with Blake's finding that Ormond was murdered, as it is bad local publicity. Blake demonstrates how Ormond's hyoid bone was broken, indicating strangulation. Nick Manos never wins the begonia contest, and there has been a feud between the Griffith and Manos families since the prior century. Manos's daughter Maria and Griffith's son Oliver have a relationship, but Maria uses Danny as cover to keep their romance a secret. Griffith has been buying land in nearby Bendigo, giving him a motive to move the festival there. Angela Waterston, who has the fatal disease aplastic anemia, plans to marry and asks Blake to stand in place of her father at her wedding. Blake gets a call saying his wife and daughter, lost to him during the war, were seen alive; then a letter comes from Malaya. Evidence is found showing that Griffith had been paying Ormond to agree to move the Festival to Bendigo. Entrants in the begonia contest had tried to bribe Ormond, including Jean with a cake, which he told her he cannot eat. But someone had eaten a slice of the cake left at Ormond's home. At the Miss Begonia contest, Maria announces that she and Oliver are engaged. Blake is concerned that Angela is deteriorating too rapidly. He realizes someone has tampered with her tonic, adding arsenic with sugar to cover the taste of the poison. Her fiancé, Anthony Farmer turns out to be a conman with a record of killing his wealthy young brides. Ormond recognized him at the opening day and was killed by Farmer, who was speeding the death of Angela. Farmer's presence at Ormond's home was given away by the missing slice of cake. He is charged with murder and attempted murder. Guest cast: John Wood, David Whiteley, Tony Nikolakopoulos, Alinta Chidzey, and Michael Bishop
6	6	"If the Shoe Fits"	Andrew Prowse	Stuart Page	8 March 2013	1.021
At the shoe factory owned by Patrick Tyneman, the plant manager Egan and the foreman argue. Mosca, the foreman, is found dead a few hours later. His hand was cut off by one of the machines, which had no safety switch. Blake has been pushing Tyneman to upgrade the equipment and calls reporter Joy McDonald before the autopsy is complete. Gus, the other police doctor, sees the wound to Mosca's head, showing he was pushed into the machine and thus murdered. Jean auditions for the local production of The Importance of Being Earnest, where she gets a minor role. The larger role she auditioned for goes to Tyneman's wife. Play director Robert is interested in Jean and proposes to her, but she turns him down. A factory employee, Gorski, tells Blake that Mosca had been taking a percent of the wages of all the workers. Mattie sees Romana Novak, who works at the plant, and has signs of syphilis, including a rash. Factory worker Mrs Krol tells Blake that many women in the factory have that rash. Blake does a second test on Mosca's blood, which shows evidence of tertiary stage syphilis and suggests he was forcing himself on the women in the factory. Egan knew that employee wages were skimmed, and he benefited from that scheme. Lawson questions Egan and then Romana as possible suspects. Mattie brings a penicillin injection to treat the jailed Romana's syphilis. Blake comes to the factory in response to a call from Gorski and finds that he has killed Egan, which he freely admits. A shoe last that could be the murder weapon in the Mosca killing is found in Egan's desk with Mosca's blood. Blake suggests to Gorski that Romana accidentally killed Mosca trying to fight him off. Without Egan's evidence that Romana was in the factory after clocking out, there is not enough evidence against her, so Lawson releases her. Guest cast: John Wood, Sara Gleeson and Jacek Koman
7	7	"Bedlam"	Declan Eames	Chris Corbett	15 March 2013	0.836 (Overnight)
Nurse Violet Ashby is murdered in the Blackhill psychiatric hospital. Patient David Hoyle is found cowering in the corner holding the knife that killed her. Danny and Mattie tell Violet's father, Doug Ashby, of her death. Ashby was Superintendent Lawson's commanding officer for 10 years. Blake is not confident that the patient killed her. After visiting David, Blake talks with another patient, Oriel Vogel, who shows him two paintings she did before and after the murder. She paints the light as it is, and the room is often darkened when the ECT is on. Mattie learns that Violet was reprimanded a year earlier because a patient died, perhaps due to an error in medications. Oriel visits Blake at his office, bringing two paintings of him at the hospital and telling him about David's personality. Dr Winters at the hospital tells Lawson and Blake that he loved Violet. Given a clue by Oriel's paintings, Blake examines the ECT log, finding that David was given sessions by Dr Laine before and after Violet was killed. Ashby comes to the hospital and grabs Laine, whose name appeared too often in his daughter's notes, which carefully recorded all treatments given to patients. Lawson tells Ashby to put his gun down. Laine considered his research on ECT was more important than the hospital's patients. He was responsible for the death of the patient, who he says no one would miss. Lawson arrests Dr Laine for the murder of Violet Ashby. Guest cast: John Stanton, Matthew Dyktynski and Lara Jean Marshall; First appearance of Chief Supt. Douglas Ashby
8	8	"Game of Champions"	Ian Barry	Stuart Page	22 March 2013	0.948
The winning contestant, James Holbrook, on a television quiz show, the Game of Champions, is killed just after the show ends. Contestant Simon Lo, the former champion with a long run of right answers, is upset that he lost, but all attention turns to the murdered man. Patrick Tyneman, whose store Tyneman Electrics sponsors the show is very upset that Lo will be returning to the show, as viewers have complained about a Chinese man's winning. Blake discovers that James died by electrocution, not a heart attack as originally believed. Back at the station they find that the new television that was part of the prize package had been tampered with and electrocuted James when he touched the antenna. James, Simon, Dawn Prentice, who works at the station, and Roger Lambert, the station technician who also works at from Tyneman's store, were in the same class at school Professor Waterman, who ran the advanced program including the four, considers Simon very bright but a trouble maker. James and Roger had beaten Simon, but Roger was kicked out of school because James said he alone was responsible. Waterman had contributed the quiz show question that unsettled Simon, leading him to lose to James. The next program has Simon versus Waterman, student versus master. After Simon does a perfect round, the dial is turned to turn off his microphone, but instead he is electrocuted on live television. Blake and his household puzzle over who has murdered the two men, then realize that the murderer originally wanted to kill Simon and was unaware that the announcer Alan Coleman and Waterman had devised a scheme to end Simon's winning streak. Dawn and James were engaged, and the prize money was going to start them off in life. Dawn killed her own fiancé by accident. Blake confronts her in the darkened television station, with a series of questions to be answered true or false. She admits to her failed scheme, while Lawson and Danny listen in the wings. Lawson arrests her for two murders. Guest cast: John Wood and Nicholas Bell
9	9	"All That Glitters"	Andrew Prowse	Tim Pye	29 March 2013	0.969
A man named Arthur comes to the pub where Doctor Blake and Danny Parks are playing darts, showing off a gold nugget he says came from his own mine. The next morning, police arrive at the mine site, where Arthur lies dead, murdered, at the bottom. Blake notes that his appearance has changed; he is wearing different clothes and shaved off his beard. Police learn he was Arthur Pike, renting a small place on the property of Margaret and Eric Reid. Gus and Blake perform the autopsy; finding blows to the head, burns on his forearms and some atrophy and a surgical scar on his left leg, probably to treat polio. He also has soft hands, unexpected in a gold miner. Joe Springer, a gold dealer, says the sample Arthur had left at the bar is good. Mattie's friend Eadie's fiancé Russ comes in for treatment of a large splinter that appears to come from the ladder to Arthur's mine. Blake calls the police about Russ and later attends the reception for the new British Consul General, an event he'd tried to avoid. After drinking too much, he speaks up about British behaviour to Australia during WWII. Lawson tries to intervene and is punched by Blake, who was trying to strike the Consul. At the jail where Russ and Blake are held, Blake asks Russ to keep talking to distract him, because he suffers from claustrophobia after being confined while a POW. Russ says he went to the mine site in hopes of finding gold to pay for a honeymoon, but the ladder rungs broke under him. He did not see Arthur or his car. Blake advises Lawson to speak with Eric Reid, rather than Russ, since Reid was not where he claimed to be on the evening Arthur was killed. Two arrogant detectives arrive from Melbourne. Lawson says Arthur's driver's license was forged, so police do not know his real name. Margaret returns to Blake, saying she believes she is pregnant, not by her husband but by Arthur, whose name was John Strickland. She wants to leave her bully of a husband. Eric claims he was with another woman the night of the murder. Jan Vennick, the man who owned the land before Strickland says there was never gold in that mine. Several years earlier, Strickland was interviewed about a gold theft from a Melbourne dealer, Joe Springer's father. The stolen gold is found by police in Strickland's car, which was packed to leave town with Margaret. Blake finds Joe in the mine, where a wall had caved in on him. Joe admits killing Strickland, who used the claim site to explain the stolen gold. Joe's father died soon after the theft, so he and his mother moved to Ballarat. Lawson is pleased that his team outdid the Melbourne detectives. Blake calls Margaret and Eric in, saying a mix-up in the lab shows results of her previous tests were incorrect and there's no reason she can't become pregnant by Eric. He advises Eric to take special care of Margaret. Then Blake apologizes to Jean for the words he spoke at the reception, hurtful to all who lost someone in the war.
10	10	"Someone's Son, Someone's Daughter"	Ian Barry	Jane Allen	5 April 2013	1.045
After a party at the hospital, Mattie overhears an argument between surgeon Hazel Mahoney and nurse Carol Stanning. Later that evening, Mattie finds Hazel, Ballarat Hospital's first female surgeon, hanging in an apparent suicide. Mattie tries resuscitation, but Hazel is dead. Surgeon Geoffrey Nicholson, an officious man on the hospital board made Hazel's life a misery, as she discussed in her last conversation with Mattie. The autopsy shows she was dead before being hanged, and Mattie realizes that the knot in the noose would not have been tied by a surgeon. A search of Carol's room turns up Hazel's record book. Nurse Nancy Carmody tells the police she was worried about her grades from Hazel, so Carol had taken Hazel's record book to help her. Joy McDonald appears in town to do a story about Blake at the request of Patrick Tyneman, who is on the hospital board, but he talks her into digging into Nicholson, who had benefited under the estate of a patient who died soon after changing her will. Lawson asks Blake to examine the burn marks on Nancy's hand and wrist, which she admits are from the radiator in her room. He realizes she has been harming herself and offers to find someone to help her. Gus presents a toxicology report finding that Hazel had morphine in her system when she died, At the board meeting, Blake accuses Nicholson of being involved in Hazel's death, but is embarrassed when Nicholson explains that the patient who left him her estate was his birth mother. Blake resigns from the hospital board. Joy offers to help find Blake's long-missing wife and child. He opens a letter from Singapore that he'd been hesitating to read, which tells him that his wife has died. Blake becomes suspicious of the autopsy blood tests and reviews the hospital pharmacist's prescription records. He draws another sample from Hazel's body and compares Gus's handwriting on the autopsy report with a suspicious morphine prescription. The room is suddenly darkened by Gus, and Blake tells him he realizes that Hazel discovered the phony prescriptions Gus had written, revealing his addiction. Gus threatens Blake with a syringe of potassium chloride, the poison he used to kill Hazel. Lawson and Danny arrive in the nick of time to stop Gus and take him away. Blake gets a telegram saying his daughter is alive, so he heads for Shanghai to meet her. He leaves a new placard in his own name for his medical office, to replace his father's name plate, as Ballarat now feels like home. Guest cast: John Wood and Sara Gleeson; Last regular appearance of Constable Daniel Parks and Assistant Gus Hawting

=== Series 2 (2014) ===
No. overall	No. in series	Title	Directed by	Written by	Original release date	AUS viewers (million)
11	1	"The Heart of the Matter"	Declan Eames	Stuart Page	7 February 2014	1.117
Blake returns from Shanghai just as Ballarat's re-elected mayor Graham Trevorrow is murdered. New senior constable Charlie Davis has taken Danny Parks's place on the force; he interviews councillor Adeline Campbell, who was first to see the mayor's body on the town hall stairs and, the next morning interviews the contentious Bruce Beattie, who failed to win the position of mayor. Lawson thinks that Davis may have been sent by Melbourne to watch over the Ballarat police force. Patrick Tyneman invited reporter Joy McDonald to Ballarat to cover the expected political change. Blake finds evidence that Trevorrow had a tryst with a lover in the town hall storage room, including a lipstick-stained handkerchief among his effects. Councillor Campbell wears the lipstick color found on Trevorrow's handkerchief. She is an independent councillor persuaded to vote for Trevorrow by his ally Doug Calahan. Blake meets Joy for a drink and recommends she speak with Carl Laidley the town hall cleaner. Later that evening Lawson picks Blake up at home and takes him to town hall, where Joy lies dead near the stairs where Trevorrow was found. The sight removes the happy smile Blake has had since his return. Blake speaks with Laidley at the jail cell, but neither he nor Lawson believe Laidley did it. Blake visits town hall and sees blood up on a ceiling light fixture and a cricket bat in Doug Calahan's office. Calahan enters the room, turns and runs from Blake, falling over the stair railing. Blake and Laidley save him from the fall that Blake realises killed Joy. Calahan killed the mayor after he bragged about being with Mrs Campbell, the self-centered politician took one thing too many. Joy's death was an accident; Calahan had struggled with her and tried to pull her back up over the railing, but she could not hold on. He is charged with murder and manslaughter. Once it is over, Jean asks about Blake's daughter, Li. He shows a photo of her and mentions that he was told that his wife did not survive. Li was settled with the family that took her in years ago and not happy to see him, though he was pleased to see her thriving. Guest cast: John Wood and Sara Gleeson; First regular appearance of Constable Charlie Davis and last appearance of Joy McDonald
12	2	"The Food of Love"	Declan Eames	Pete McTighe	14 February 2014	1.011
Bobby Lee, lead singer of a popular rock and roll group, dies in an alley outside Ballarat's concert hall surrounded by his fans. Mattie was there to look after one of the young fans. The body is moved to a nearby pub owned by Gerry Bowen because the morgue is full and the hospital cannot accept the body. Blake does the autopsy with the aid of senior constable Charlie Davis and finds Lee died after being stabbed. Mattie is brought to the police station after accidentally assaulting Davis while trying to assist 16-year-old Shirley Freedman, who is distraught over Lee's death. Lawson questions band member Tony Capuano, who was heard to argue with Lee after the performance and had followed him into the alleyway. He mentions that he and Lee started the band together, but now it was "all about him." He mentions that Lee's real name was Gunther Hansen. Blake encounters the photographer who was on hand when Lee collapsed and pays him for copies of his photos of the event. The police investigate Lee's fans, other band members and preacher Howard McArthur, who was outside the venue preaching against the devil's music and was right next to Lee when he collapsed. Constable Ned Simmons finds that McArthur has prior arrests, one involving use of a knife. Blake and Jean attend McArthur's revival meeting, where he rails that "death will come to the agents of the devil." A knife that could be the murder weapon is found in the alleyway, despite the fact that constable David searched it twice and is certain that it wasn't there. The photos that Blake acquired reveal that Lee was stabbed before coming out into the alleyway. Shirley's father comes to Blake's home looking for her; she is at the police station being questioned. She had found Lee-related items outside the venue and had pulled a ring off his finger when he fell down dead. Blake realizes the items Shirley found belonged to Bowen's 16-year-old daughter Peggy and takes them to her in the pub basement where the body is still located. When Bowen comes downstairs, he admits stabbing Lee when he brought the complimentary beer to the band. Peggy had told him she'd become pregnant by Lee and then lost the baby, though Mattie learns that she recently asked her own doctor for basic information about how women get pregnant. She actually had never met Lee. Her father admits dropping the knife in the alleyway and is arrested. Blake comes home to find Jean listening to some of that rock and roll music. Guest cast: Cameron Daddo
13	3	"A Foreign Field"	Lee Rogers	Marcia Gardner	21 February 2014	0.914 (Overnight)
Two women from the local library and historical society find the body of a man by a tree in the botanical garden The body was there overnight, and the autopsy reveals he died by cyanide, which Blake identifies by its odor. The clothes on the body have no labels. A key in his pocket for a locker at the train station contains a suitcase with clothing, a flier for a local rooming house and a page from a book of poetry. The landlady says he stayed there two nights under the name John Smith and had a fight with another resident over a book of poetry. Lola Lundqvist from Castlemaine, appears at the station claiming the dead man was her husband, Sven Lundqvist, born in Sweden, who disappeared a year ago. People who were at the botanical garden the day before the body was found saw the man kissing a blonde woman under the tree, but they didn't see her face so cannot identify Mrs Lundqvist. Charlie Davis captures Aaron, a mentally impaired and mute man who had been hiding in the bushes, and he indicates that Mrs Lundqvist was not the woman with the victim. Blake goes to the library to enquire about the poem found in the dead man's suitcase, which was by A D Hope. The librarian tells him he'd discussed Hope with "a Dutch fellow," and they find the book of Hope's poetry is gone. Blake visits the rooming house and finds that the man gave the book, which is contains a page of coded writing, to the landlady. Meanwhile, Lawson has taken calls from several women giving a name for the dead man, who was their lover or husband. The names all belonged to infants or boys who died long before. Lawson also has been getting calls from the Federal Police about Blake's recent trip to China. Blake tries to decode the message in the book. He admits to Jean that he spent time after the war working as a government agent. The next morning, Jean notes that a group of numbers he has written on a blackboard resembles a Ballarat phone number. She calls it and finds that it is the Ballarat Historical Society. Mattie and Blake find Aaron again in the garden, wearing the coat from the dead man.There is a blonde hair on the coat (which turns out to be from a wig). Mattie and Aaron accompany Blake to the library, where Aaron identifies Martha Harris (one of the two women who found the body) as the woman he saw with the victim, even though she is brunette. She is a member of the Australian Communist Party and had lost a government job because of a relationship with a Soviet attache. When Blake stops her from taking a cyanide pill she confesses. She had provided her lover with papers for the false identities he used as he moved around Australia. She left the message in the book arranging a meeting where she killed him -- wearing her sick aunt's blond wig -- because he was unfaithful to her. Alice Harvey, a new pathologist joins the Ballarat medical team. Guest cast: Edwina Wren, Sibylla Budd and Mark Casamento; First regular appearance of Dr. Alice Harvey
14	4	"Smoke and Mirrors"	Lee Rogers	Chelsea Cassio	28 February 2014	1.111
Cec Drury of the Colonists Club is standing outside the club about 9:30 pm when a man falls onto the roof of a car and dies. Noel Ashford was the president of the local flying club. Blake is called away from the autopsy to assess the injuries to police constable Martin by a hit-and-run driver the same night. Superintendent Lawson and Charlie Davis find the vehicle, a delivery truck apparently owned by Leon Woods, owner of Ballarat Apple Farm. When Blake and Alice Harvey resume the autopsy the next morning, they find that Ashford's internal organs are out of place, just like those of a parachutist whose chute did not open. There also is evidence of frostbite on his face, leading Blake to think Ashford fell from a plane, not the roof of the club. When Ashford's wife picks up his personal effects, she says that the packet of loose tobacco in his pocket must have belonged to one of the flying club pilots, as Ashford did not smoke. The truck that struck Martin is not one of the two trucks owned by Woods, as Blake notes an error on the truck's sign that would not have been made by an apple expert. At the flying club, Blake and Davis examine the log book, which is written in pencil, and speak with Hugh Dankworth and his co-pilot Lyle Townsend. Blake finds that Cec has a packet of the same type of tobacco found on Ashford, which was purchased on the black market. Barber Willard Baxter sells the same loose tobacco and says he can get more in 5 hours, which is the flying time to the nearest tobacco farm. The phony Apple Farm truck has evidence it was transporting tobacco. Blake speaks again with the two pilots and sees that their plane has fresh mud on the tires while it hasn't rained locally for weeks. The two admit to flying after dark, but say they were back at the airfield by 7:30 pm and Ashford was not with them. Blake observes that Dankworth is red-green colour blind, which makes it difficult to read the plane's controls. He also finds a difference between the time on the plane's tachometer, which indicates total flying hours, and what was entered in the logbook, indicating an additional four hours flown. Dankworth is arrested but denies that Ashford knew about his color blindness. A local farmer complains about a plane flying low over his farm at both 6 pm and 9:30 pm, and Blake realizes there are two different planes. Charlie has a date with Beatrice the flying club secretary, and Blake interrupts their date out at the airfield. They find another plane in a hangar with fresh mud on the tires, but Beatrice claims it hasn't been flown for months. There is an odor of tobacco in the plane, along with a thread from Ashford's jacket. Townsend was discharged from the air force for flying contraband, so Lawson calls in Willard Baxter to close this connection and arrests him. At the same time, Blake is at the airfield inspecting the plane. He hides in back when Beatrice enters the co-pilot seat and then Sarah Alexander, Ashford's stepdaughter, gets in the pilot seat. Sarah starts the plane, intending to fly with Blake, but a police vehicle drives on the airstrip until she stops the engines. The two women piloted the tobacco flights. Sarah Alexander's father taught her how to fly and started the illegal tobacco flights. He was killed in an accident that Noel Ashford survived. She blames Ashford for the accident and became particularly bitter when he married her mother a few months later. Ashford had stowed away on the plane, suspecting illegal use of it, when Sarah and Beatrice entered and took off, unaware of his presence. Sarah tells Lawson that Ashford's fall from the plane was an accident, but Lawson says it is murder because she failed to help him back into the plane the plane's door popped open as the plane banked in turbulent weather. Lawson calls out Charlie Davis for taking Beatrice on a date when she was a suspect. Guest cast: Freya Stafford
15	5	"Crossing The Line"	Pino Amenta	Chelsea Cassio	7 March 2014	1.020
Jean goes to the cinema to see Vertigo. Midway through the film, smoke starts billowing from the projection room. Richard Taylor, a firefighter from Adelaide visiting Ballarat, races to the projection room, kicks the door in and drags Adam Summers from the room; but Adam is dead. In the autopsy, Blake and Harvey find evidence of pressure applied to Adam's neck and realize that he did not run out of the projection room because he was unconscious; it was a murder. Interviews with cinema staff and patrons reveal a discrepancy between their reports that the theatre was full and manager Miles McLaren's claim that only a few people were there. Charlie learns that McLaren undercounts his sales to cheat the film distributor. Miles apparently hated Adam and had recently had a sealed door installed on the projection room. Adam held private showings in the cinema for his friends. In Adam's wallet is a bill for a four-poster bed delivered to a derelict mansion owned by Patrick Tyneman's son, Edward. Blake finds the bed in the only clean, decorated room in the building. Mattie attends a hen party for Amelia Yorke, fiancée of Vincent Foster, while Edward Tyneman and other friends host Vincent at the buck (stag) party in the next room. Charlie goes to the stag party, using Adam's invitation, and finds a 16 mm projector in a side room with no film. Richard, the firefighter who broke down the projection room door, calls Jean, and she invites him for dinner. Blake comes home early and asks Richard how long oxygen would last in a fire in that projection room. He answers just a few minutes. The next day Edward Tyneman is uncooperative when Lawson questions him about what happens at his property. Charlie and Blake return to the projection room and find some partially damaged 16 mm film, not the 35 mm standard used for commercial film presentations. They take some of the 16 mm film, clean and repair it, and show it at Blake's house. It is pornographic, and Mattie recognizes a woman in the film, her friend Amelia. Amelia's brother Paddy borrowed money from Edward Tyneman, and when he could not pay it back, Edward said Amelia could pay it back by posing for his pornography. She tells Blake there were other girls filmed as well. Richard and Jean come home when the film is running, which shocks Richard. Then Blake finds Richard at Edward's property, about to set fire to it. His niece Rebecca was one of the other girls in Edward's pornographic films and is now under psychiatric care. The supposedly private film was shown all around the country, and her father, Richard's late brother, saw it shown in his local pub. Richard admits to murdering Adam and starting the fire in the projection booth. Blake takes Richard downtown. In Edward's next visit with Lawson, he is shown his own image caught in the mirror on the salvaged film, proving his involvement. Patrick shows up and tells Edward he cannot use the family lawyer; his behaviour is disgusting and illegal. Back at home Jean remarks that Richard was a good man but he had something sad about him. He did set a fire to burn the films, and it killed a man. Guest cast John Wood; First appearance of Edward Tyneman
16	6	"Mortal Coil"	Pino Amenta	Stuart Page	14 March 2014	1.002
At the funeral for Edith Woodley, a friend of Jean's, the pallbearers drop the coffin, and it bursts open to reveal two bodies. The second body is Sid Bartel, age 70, an itinerant scrap metal dealer who has been shot in the back of the head. The autopsy reveals Bartel was also beaten when alive. The driver for the funeral home admits hitting Bartel's cart with their car and beating Bartel up. Using Bartel's horse and cart, Blake retraces his route to an abandoned shed and discovers evidence of another murder, bloodstains and a bullet of the same caliber as the one that killed Bartel. Blake and Lawson examine the evidence of two murders at the shed -- Bartel, who was shot outside the shed and dragged off -- and an unknown. Jean tells Blake that her doctor is concerned about blood test results indicating reduced liver function, but she had no blood tests. Blake sent his own blood under her name for testing and is concerned for his own health. Lawson, Davis and Jean are all concerned by Blake's erratic behaviour, and Jean comments to Mattie that he hasn't been drinking at all for several weeks. Blake and Lawson dig up the coffin from the last burial before Bartel was found. Again they find two bodies in the coffin, again from the Callow funeral home. The other body is Andrew Morgan; the autopsy reveals he was shot in the head, likely in an execution. Both Andrew Morgan and his brother Victor have not been seen for four days. Davis admits to Lawson that he was sent from Melbourne to check up on Ballarat because they think Blake is a liability. Lawson says Blake simply needs managing. At the funeral home, which Lawson just closed, Blake sees Miss Callow kissing Steven Morris, the son of his friend Harold, a known bootlegger. He confronts Steven, who pushes Blake down and drives away. Blake returns to the shed and finds Victor Morgan alive in the cellar along with Harold Morris's homemade whiskey. Harold arrives with his service pistol and threatens Blake. After a scuffle, Blake takes Harold's pistol and shoots him in the leg. Years earlier Harold had broken the legs of Andrew and Victor's father in a union dispute, so the brothers came after him. Steven tells the police how his father killed Andy Morgan and then Sid Bartel, who interrupted him shooting both brothers. At the hospital, Harold says he learned to be easy with violence from the war. Blake tells Harold that Sid Bartel survived Fromelles, the worst WWI battle that Australians had seen, but didn't go bad. Harold, a veteran of WWII, shot Sid in the back, a disgraceful action. Having asked Alice Harvey to run tests on his blood, Blake finds he has hepatitis, not cirrhosis, which he had feared. She figures that his hand tremors and irritability arose from him stopping drinking, after misdiagnosing himself.
17	7	"The Silence"	Declan Eames	Pete McTighe	21 March 2014	1.101
Joseph Lennox, the headmaster of the local elementary school is found dead in his office from a blow to the head, probably from a school trophy, and a ruptured spleen; the excessive bleeding is at first a mystery to Blake and Alice Harvey. Lennox has warfarin in his blood at high dose. Lawson suspects the deputy headmaster Donald McAvoy, who had bullied him at the same school which McAvoy, Lawson and Blake attended as youngsters. Charlie Davis and Blake search the Lennox house, finding one woman's earring and his medications, one containing warfarin. Blake visits the tuck shop (eatery) run by Mrs Wooton, where he finds a package of the rat poison containing warfarin; it is not allowed in a food preparation location. Lennox got lunch and dinner from the tuck shop daily. Police investigate how the poison was administered and the women involved with the headmaster, including Caroline Palmer, a teacher fired six weeks earlier who had helped at the tuck shop but not since she was fired from the school. Miss Blackwell, secretary at the school, reported that Lennox ate his breakfast at home. A more sinister story emerges from two siblings at the school, Paul and Lisa Wooton. Paul tells Charlie Davies that he heard Lennox and Blackwell shouting at the school that day, when he went back to pick up his school trophy. Blake considers Lennox's diet, and figures he liked tea and cake, not yet analyzed. He takes sweets for tea from the tuck shop and shares them with Jean, Mattie, and Superintendent Lawson. Then he wants to do a blood test on them to test for warfarin; they refuse. Blake ate the coconut cake, a lamington, having found shreds of coconut under Lennox's desk The lamington was the source of the warfarin to Lennox. Blackwell admits to the police the loud argument with Lennox shortly before his death, when Lennox called her a pathetic woman. The tuck shop baked lamington cakes regularly for Lennox; specifically, her son Paul baked them. The earring found belonged to Lisa. Mrs Wooton's husband left her. Caroline Palmer told Mrs Wooton of seeing Lennox abusing Lisa, but Mrs Wooton did not believe her. Miss Palmer tells her own story to Lawson of abuse by her uncle during childhood, when her father did not believe her, after Lawson pulled the trophy used to hit Lennox from her garden waste. Lawson believes her, tells her that Paul had been putting warfarin in the cakes, and then arrests her for the assault. Davis and Blake find Paul and Lisa on the road, where Lisa threatens to jump from the bridge. Blake talks her out of jumping and off the bridge wall. Paul was poisoning the headmaster because of what he did to his sister and will face juvenile justice. Mattie wonders if she should have picked up on the girl's situation. Lawson returns the shoes to McAvoy on his day off, facing him down as he bullies a student.
18	8	"The Ties of the Past"	Declan Eames	Marcia Gardner	28 March 2014	1.069
As an art class begins, the instructor Geoffrey Ledwith pulls away the screen to reveal a bloody, dead woman, Virginia Mackay, the life model and his girlfriend. Gallery director Barry Johnstone seeks the gallery keys given to Miss Mackay, which were not among her possessions. The gallery reminds Blake of his late mother, who was a painter. Charlie Davis and Blake find broken pottery at Mackay's place. They pursue Ledwith at his pottery studio and ask him about a loud argument Mackay's neighbors overheard the night before her death, which included the sound of smashing pottery. When Ledwith attacks Blake, Davis takes him into the station. In response to Lawson's questions, Ledwith says he killed Mackay. Blake thinks the murder weapon might have been a potter's wire, but can find no blood on the one Ledwith was using. A painting is stolen from the art gallery. The next day gallery guard, Ted Baldwin, is found hit by a car - in a coma but alive - with the stolen painting nearby. Blake believes Baldwin gave the stolen painting to a partner in crime. Ledwith retracts his confession, and in response to being asked whether he'd hit Mackay says that while he was doing great work, she wasn't a real artist. Blake tells him he is a spoiled brat with very little imagination. The painting stolen from the gallery was hung to replace one by local artist Genevieve Ettienne, which both Johnstone and Brendan Ross, visiting from the Melbourne National Gallery, say is of little worth. They are both embarrassed to learn that she was Blake's mother. Reviewing Mackay's books about famous Australian Painter David Davies, Blake finds a print of his mother's portrait of her friend Agnes Clasby, who is still his patient. That was the painting stolen from the gallery. Blake "borrows" the painting from the gallery and has it x-rayed, revealing a painting by Davies underneath. Agnes tells Blake that Davies regarded Genevieve as his muse, which made Blake's father very jealous. When Davies gave her the painting, her husband demanded they cut contact and sold it to Patrick Tyneman's father, Michael. But Genevieve "lost" the Davies painting by painting Agnes's portrait over it. Blake thinks that Mackay accidentally damaged the painting while moving it, and when she went to repair the damage, recognized the extremely valuable Davies painting underneath. Mackay's flatmate Elaine Greenslade tells Blake and Lawson that when Mackay returned from studying at the National Gallery in Melbourne, she was very depressed, having again been regarded as just a pretty face. Her professor in Melbourne was Ross. After Genevieve's painting is returned to the gallery, the police easily catch Ross trying to steal it. Blood is found on Ross's car, along with a pottery wire cutter, implying that he killed Mackay. He also has the missing gallery keys that she borrowed and is the driver who ran over Baldwin. Blake and Tyneman discuss the ownership of the painting by Blake's mother, with the Davies painting underneath. Although his father never returned the purchase price to Michael Tyneman, Blake comes home with the picture and hangs it in his mother's studio, which he recently opened for the first time since his father locked it after her death. Guest cast: John Wood, Helen Morse
19	9	"The Sky Is Empty"	Ian Barry	Chelsea Cassio	4 April 2014	1.083
Father Cyril Morton giving a wandering Sunday sermon against adultery. Late that night he takes a phone call from someone asking to meet him for confession. The next morning Jean comes to church and finds Father Morton dead in the confessional. He died the night before from anaphylactic shock. Evelyn Toohey, his housekeeper, thinks she killed him by giving him a new fruit to eat, a kiwi from New Zealand. At the autopsy they learn from surgeon David Michaels that Father Morton had a brain tumor. They also see that he was stung many times by bees, to which he was allergic. Superintendent Lawson seems jumpy and tells Charlie Davis to take charge of the case. At the church, Davis and Blake find broken glass, dead bees and a bible with candle wax on one page. Their theory is that someone knew of the priest's allergy, tossed a jar of bees into the confessional and blocked the priest's door. Younger priest Father Emery keeps bees but insists that Father Morse did not object. Evelyn Toohey tells Blake that Father Emery had wanted Father Morton to retire and that Ben and Celia Lloyd had walked out of his last sermon. She saw Ben Lloyd arguing with Father Morton after Mass. The church sewing circle, including Jean, Celia Lloyd and Dorothy Turner, meet at Blake's home to prepare the linens for the funeral. Celia announces that she is pregnant but has not told her husband yet. Jean reveals to Blake and Lawson that Celia is angry with Father Morton, as his sermons lately seemed to match her confessions, which should be private. Morton's brain tumor had reached into the frontal lobe and may have been affecting his judgment. Police are called to the Lloyd house to restrain Ben, who injured his wife in the abdomen. At the hospital, she and her baby are found to be in good condition. Ben knew about Morton's bee allergy and is looking like a suspect for killing the priest. Evelyn gives Jean letters written by Father Emery, which she didn't mail because they were complaints to the archdiocese about Father Morton. Lawson will not let his officers open sealed mail without a warrant. Father Morton's recent sermons were about the commandments and appear to be tied to parishioners' secrets. The topic of the next sermon, written not yet given, is the sanctity of life or "thou shalt not kill," which was posted on the church bulletin board. The bees in the confessional were Cyprian bees. The police find a keeper of Cyprian bees outside town who is away from home. Blake and Davis visit that scene with Father Emery, who keeps Ligurian bees. They find one hive tampered with and see ash from a cigar, which an amateur might use to produce smoke to calm the bees. Remembering where he saw an ashtray for cigars, Blake says they have found the killer. He and Charlie visit surgeon David Michaels, who had treated Dorothy Turner after she was severely beaten by her husband and received disabling injuries. He also operated on Dorothy's husband after a car crash and let the husband die. Michaels had confessed that sin to Father Morton, and when he realized that the brain tumor was causing him to break the seal of the confessional, he decided to speed the process leading to Morton's death. He is arrested and charged with Morton's murder. Superintendent Lawson tells Davis and Blake he has been called to Melbourne to face a disciplinary board, leaving Davis temporarily in charge. Blake takes an early morning walk to the church and wonders aloud whether Father Morton knew he was losing his mind. So many people beg God for help, and Blake asks "what father ignores his children?" Turning away from the altar, Blakes ends by saying, "I can't". First appearance of Father Emery
20	10	"An Invincible Summer"	Ian Barry	Stuart Page	11 April 2014	1.060
Jack Beazley, Jean's 24 year-old son, wins a running race that Charlie Davis is also running. That morning, a window washer sees three dead people at the Dennison home. The police find the Dennison parents Cameron and Lorna and one son Samuel shot dead. Another son ran in the race, and the daughter's whereabouts are not known. Acting Superintendent Doug Ashby is at the scene when Blake arrives. Blake finds the terrified daughter, Aileen, in a cupboard with her dog. She is blind and tells Blake and Ashby that she heard three shots, but the police know five shots were fired. Her brother Owen comes to see his sister in the hospital. Cameron Dennison's brother Clyde identifies the deceased family members at the morgue and tells the police of a third son Albert, a disgrace to the family who now goes by Corrigan. The Dennison family are wealthy and generous; they sponsored the race that day. Patrick Tyneman asks Ashby whether anyone has been arrested, as angry people are calling his newspaper. Charlie brings Albert to the police station, where he becomes upset and violent when told his mother is dead. Ashby subdues him, and Blake sedates him. Charlie reveals his bruised ribs to Blake, explaining that Jack hit him during the race when it seemed Charlie would win. He also saw Jack in the bar of the hotel where Albert was staying, At home, Jean explains that Albert was a sweet boy who was cut off because he wanted to marry a Catholic girl. Jack is now staying at the Blake home and makes an unsuccessful pass at Mattie. The next day Albert tells police he last saw his father a week earlier, when it was made official that he was cut out of his father's will. Ashby tells Clyde Dennison he knows Clyde unsuccessfully tried to take control of the family's many assets. Police are called to intercept a vehicle approaching Ballarat after an armed robbery in a nearby town, a vehicle that had been seen near the Dennison home. In the shootout at the police roadblock, Ashby kills Ray Banford, who was about to shoot Charlie. Ivy Douglas survives the shootout and is taken to the hospital. Ashby brings Jack, whose fingerprints are on the suspect vehicle, in for questioning. Ten years earlier, 14-year-old Jack was arrested by Ashby and sent to a reformatory, where he was in a dormitory with Ray Banford. In response to Jack's question, Charlie tells him that Ivy is recovering from surgery and is pregnant. Jack may be the father. Since Jack is a suspect, Ashby orders Blake off the case. Blake worries about the appearance of the Dennison corpses when found. Studying the photos of the scene, Charlie notes that the dog bowl's was still full of dinner scraps. The pattern of blood on the morning newspaper in front of the victims indicates that it was placed on the table after the shootings. Blake deduces that the murders could have happened up to 12 hours before they were discovered and the scene staged to suggest the shooting occurred in the morning. Tyneman's paper publishes that Jack is a suspect and is staying at Blake's house. A crowd of men appears there and attacks Jean. Mattie, Charlie and Blake intervene. When Owen Dennison is questioned about what he did the night before the race, he says he slept at home and said goodbye to his parents the next morning, a time when they were already dead. Charlie restrains Owen while Blake goes to confront Aileen, who faces him with a gun. She agreed with her uncle Clyde that her father was giving away the family wealth and directed Owen to do the shooting. Blake gets the gun out of her hand, and she too is arrested. Blake tells Jack how his mother stood up to the crowd of men for him. Jack accuses him of doing nothing about the gossip regarding his relationship with Jean, then goes home, packs his bags and leaves. Blake makes it clear to Jean that she lives there and her son will be welcome in the future; "they'll always be our children." Guest cast: John Wood, John Stanton; First regular appearance of Acting Superintendent Douglas Ashby

=== Series 3 (2015) ===
No. overall	No. in series	Title	Directed by	Written by	Original release date	AUS viewers (million)
21	1	"King of the Lake"	Pino Amenta	Michael Harvey	13 February 2015	1.174
Two boats are fiercely competing in a rowing competition, with a crowd cheering them on, including Patrick Tyneman. While the crowd cheers the winning pair from Ballarat College, one of the losers from the high school team accuses college rower Dennis Goodman of cheating. Dennis and Arnie Ross are tossed into the water as part of the celebration, but only Arnie comes up. The autopsy reveals that Dennis died with an unusual amount of water in his lungs, indicating his larynx never closed and that this was not a normal drowning. Dennis's father Herbert, his coach and a former Olympian, is furious that Blake will not release his son's body because he has not been able to determine cause of death. Charlie Davis, now acting sergeant, has moved into Blake's house. Blake tells Jean that Dennis's mother Monica was the first woman he ever courted. The Goodman's second son, Lucas, is more an academic than an athlete. Alcohol is found in Dennis's stomach contents, but his father insists he didn't drink. Ashby gives Blake 24 hours to determine whether Dennis's death was murder, not an accident. Arnie admits accidentally kicking Dennis when they were underwater. He says he was glad he was on the team with Dennis but obviously resented that Dennis got all the attention. He says that Dennis took away his girlfriend, Rachel and was cheating on her. A bottle of vodka is found in the locker of Les Bates, one of the losing rowers. Les reveals that Herbert Goodman roughed up his son before each race, to get him angry. Tyneman switches his sponsorship from Dennis Goodman to Tim Webb, a member of the high school team who is regarded as a potential Olympian. Ashby tells Blake that, depending on the lab results, if he does not release Dennis's body, he will have to review his position as police surgeon. But lab tests show that Dennis was injecting himself with testosterone, a performance enhancer. His father prevents the family doctor from releasing Dennis's medical records. Dennis's girlfriend Rachel had previously said that Dennis would not taste his lemonade after the race because it was not yellow enough. In an interview with Charlie, Rachel admits she was angry with Dennis because he was seeing someone else and putting the vodka in his drink after the race to get him into trouble. Arnie admits helping Rachel spike Dennis's drink and putting the bottle in Les Bates's locker. When Blake asks if Dennis had ever said things looked strange, Arnie says for the past few weeks he had seemed to be obsessed with whether things were yellow. Rachel's mother admits to Blake that Dennis spent the night with her when Rachel was away and threatened to tell Rachel if she wouldn't continue the relationship. She also reports that Dennis was dizzy once but took something from his sports bag and felt better. Charlie finds Dennis's sports bag hidden on the roof of the boathouse. As Blake suspected, the bag contains a syringe, testosterone and Digoxin, a medicine derived from the foxglove plant. It is used to treat several conditions, including an irregular heartbeat, and makes things appear yellow. Blake was reminded of Digoxin when he saw 'extract of foxglove' in his mother's medical records. Dennis's father refuses to answer Blake's question about his own heart health, but his brother Lucas confirms that his brother was taking something, which he also told rival team member Tim Webb. Tim found the medications in Dennis's bag and, realizing he'd been cheated, switched the digoxin for diet pills. In researching the pills, he found that without digoxin, Dennis's heart would stop when he was thrown into cold water. Tim actually let Dennis's team win to ensure the success of his plan. He will be charged for murder as a youth. Without digoxin, things that looked yellow to Dennis were the wrong color. Dennis's father feels his son's death is his fault because of the inherited heart condition, but Ashby says there are other reasons for his responsibility. When Blake remarks to Dennis's mother Monica how her son left a trail of damage behind him, she hopes that they hang Tim, who couldn't cope with the fact that Dennis was a better rower. Ashby tells Blake he has many enemies, and Ashby is not one of them. He indirectly asks Blake to keep investigating future cases. From the medical file that was recently found, Blake learns his mother had a miscarriage when he was two years old, and she had been diabetic. Guest cast: John Wood
22	2	"My Brother's Keeper"	Pino Amenta	Pino Amenta	20 February 2015	1.063
A fight breaks out among men who are gambling in a game of two-up. One man walks away and sits on the fence of a cattle pen at a local farm. Later he is discovered dead, trampled by cattle. Based on his distinctive watch, the body is identified as farmer Mark Dempster. An unusual shoe imprint is found near the body. Mrs Barbara Dempster says the dead man is not her husband Mark but his brother Ben. Superintendent Ashby is replaced by Supt. William Munro, who is brusque and pushy and wants to limit Blake's role in solving crimes. Nathan Eaton, one of the fighting gamblers, says the two Dempster brothers left the fight at the same time, but not together. Blake and Charlie Davis interview Ben's wife Ruth, who describes their money problems. Mark Dempster shows up at his farm and says he slept in the barn so his wife did not know where he was overnight. He lost his watch to his brother gambling and wears unusual custom-made shoes, but we cannot explain how the print appeared by brother's body. Blake discovers that Mark Dempster's farm once belonged to Jean and her late husband Christopher. Real estate agent Nathan Eaton, who had been trying to talk them into selling the farm tells police another realtor arranged the sale. Ruth did not know about the sale, and while the money cleared their mortgage debt, there is nothing left for Ruth to inherit. Blake meets farmhand Helen and her daughter Janet at Mark Dempster's farm. Barbara cannot find her husband's work boots, suggesting someone else was wearing them. Blake remarks to Jean that Janet looks like Mark Dempster. Davis gets confirmation from Mark that he is Janet's father. Blake finds the cash from the sale of Ben's farm, which Mark claims was given to Mark to invest. Blake notices that Janet has brown eyes, but both Helen and Mark have blue eyes, indicating that someone else was the child's father. Helen admits that Ben was the father. Blake realizes Ruth's possible role in the murder at the same time as Ruth is telling Jean that she knew of her husband's affair up with Helen and learned the week before he was giving her money. Blake arrives just in time to stop Ruth from a second murder, and she tells the police how she killed her husband and admits making the footprints with Mark's boots. Despite Blake's solving this murder, Munro lectures him and says Blake is either with him or against him. Guest cast: Jane Allsop; First regular appearance of Chief Superintendent Munro
23	3	"This Time and This Place"	Fiona Banks	Michael Miller	27 February 2015	1.156
Emma Keneally is shot dead at a Bonfire Night celebration. She was there with Mattie and some children from the local orphanage. Sergeant Bill Hobart arrests Winston Cummings, an Aboriginal boy from the orphanage, seen holding a gun in his hand. Charlie Davis finds the gun, a Luger from the war, and Blake observes from evidence at the scene that the shooter was left-handed. A local boy, Tommy Van Der Hayden, claims that he saw Winston shoot, but Charlie points out that he could not have seen Winston from where he was sitting in his car. Blake visits the orphanage with Mattie to do health checks on the children. Mattie finds Mary Jackson in tears at Winston's bed, holding his book by Martin Luther King, Jr., that has a love letter in it. Mrs Olivia Goldsmith comes to see Blake with an injury from Bonfire Night. He drives her home and talks with Mr Ian Goldsmith, who has been advocating for aboriginal children to be enrolled in the public schools. There had been an explosion in the bonfire, and Blake realizes that the blue flame seen in the explosion indicates fireworks chemicals combined with gunpowder. Winston admits tossing a can with fireworks into the bonfire, which is why he smelled of gunpowder. Blake then demonstrates that Winston is too shortsighted to have made the accurate shots that killed Emma, so he is released. Blake and Mattie visit the sweet shop run by Tommy and his dad Kevin, who complains about the aboriginal children in the school and suggests that Emma had been too close to Ian Goldsmith. Superintendent Munro takes Charlie to dinner, trying to break Charlie's trust of Blake. Mrs Goldsmith was taping the sounds at Bonfire Night and claims the tape was ruined by the explosion, but Blake finds it in her trash bin. The tape reveals that the gunshots happened before the explosion in the bonfire, knocking down a theory that it was meant to cover the noise of the shots. Blake and Mattie seek Mary, who has run away from the orphanage. They find her sleeping outdoors with no coat, which reminds Mattie that Mary gave her coat to Emma on Bonfire Night. A threatening note found with Mary indicates she was the intended target, not Emma. At the Van Der Hayden's shop, Tommy admits he is in love with Mary, but she loves Winston. He wrote the love letter to her, brought his grandfather's Luger pistol to Bonfire Night, but shot the wrong young woman. At home, Blake reflects to Jean on his own daughter's difficult life in orphanages in China, a girl half-white and half-Chinese, mother dead and father gone.
24	4	"By the Southern Cross"	Fiona Banks	Roger Monk	6 March 2015	1.103
Young people from the university in Melbourne stage a protest at the memorial for the Eureka Rebellion. Mattie is present when the police break up the gathering and her photo is taken. Arguments continue at a bar, a fight breaks out and the bar closes. Next morning, Wendy Smith sees protester Des Somerville lying dead on the steps of the memorial. Mattie's father Martin, the minister for industry and commerce, is at breakfast at Blake's home when Blake is called to the memorial. The autopsy reveals a large injury at the back of the head, which should have produced substantial blood loss, but none was present at the scene. A second injury to the head took place after death, showing that the body was moved, and there is a bite mark on his arm. The students are members of the CPA, staying at the house of Colin Doyle. Martin O'Brien begins speaking on a local development plan, after being introduced by business owner Ken Farmer. He is interrupted by Doyle, who is captured by Blake and Munro, while another youth tosses red paint on O'Brien. Blake meets Davis at Doyle's home, where they find wheel tracks leading to the memorial, and question Ken Farmer's nephew Georgie Bromley. Back at the station Doyle admits alerting police to the protest and giving photographs to the local newspaper. He says that Des had a more extreme idea for Martin O'Brien's speech - mixing acid into the paint that would be thrown. Later that night, Blake tells Mattie that Doyle used her to get to her father and used Georgie to get to his uncle. At the political dinner at the club, Munro makes a point of mentioning that Blake has visited his daughter in Communist China. In return, Blake asks about Munro's war service; Munro was unable to enlist because of an injury. With aid from Mattie and Cec at the club, Blake collects saliva samples from suspects. Munro detains medical student Joseph Beville on the basis of his father's long ago support of Mussolini. He is freed once Mattie comes forward and states they were together until 4 am at Doyle's house, while Des was murdered before midnight. Blake finds that Des was killed behind Doyle's home, and realizes it was Georgie who killed Des and wheeled his body to the memorial. His saliva was in the bite on Des, leaving traces of his asthma medication behind. Blake describes the scene, when Des puts a wrestling hold on Georgie, Georgie bit him to break it and then punches Des, who falls on a brick, receiving the fatal wound. Georgie confesses, admitting that Des had been using him for the money he constributed to the cause. Munro commends Davis for his work and suggests he go for detective training. Mattie and her father make peace. Agnes Clasby, a friend of Blake's mother and now patient of his, tells him his mother died of diabetic coma after a party where she had too much to drink, not appendicitis as he had been told. Guest cast: John Wood, Martin Sacks and Helen Morse
25	5	"A Night to Remember"	Karl Zwicky	Jeff Truman	13 March 2015	1.117
Jean's son Christopher, in the Army, comes to Ballarat for the first time in eight years to see his mother in a performance of Electra at the Colonist's Club. At the curtain call after the performance, famous actress Jacqueline Maddern falls dead on the stage. Blake notices red marks on her skin and suspects poison. Superintendent Munro closes the club so that all present can be interviewed. Munro will not allow the actress's body moved to the morgue, so Mattie O'Brien carries samples to Dr Alice Harvey for testing. Miss Maddern was about to leave Australia for an American film, based on a book by Australian writer Nevil Shute. Her assistant Pamela Gilchrist aids in the search of Miss Maddern's possessions in her dressing room, which had been broken into. Patrick argues with Justin Reynolds, a reporter from Melbourne, who had tried to escape before being questioned but was stopped by Sergeants Hobart and Davis. Patrick admits to Munro that he had a brief affair with the actress a few years earlier when he invested in one of her shows. Patrick's wife Susan had just learned about the affair from Reynolds. Observing a rose petal in the dressing room and some small puncture marks on Miss Maddern's chest, Blake believes the poison was on the roses she held at curtain call. Cec Drury had told Stuart, his nephew and server for the event, to toss the roses. Munro suspects the fact that Stu is wearing gloves while putting the roses in the bin, but Stu wears them to hide psoriasis. Theatre director Warwick Simpson, once Miss Maddern's lover, tells Munro she had insisted on being paid for the charity performance. Dr. Harvey comes to the club, saying she needs to see the body to identify the poison. To get a report on the military record of one of the guests, Munro calls Army Major Alderton, who says the man is damaged and dangerous. Munro arrests Sargeant Murray Nelson, who punches him and then grabs and chokes Dr Harvey. Dr Harvey faints, then four men grab Nelson. Personal items from Miss Maddern's dressing room are found in Nelson's pockets, along with a vial of poison. Nelson applied the poison to the roses after they were delivered to the club. Blake finds a photo in Nelson's wallet, showing Nelson with both Miss Maddern and Pamela Gilchrist. Blake describes Pamela's actions to her and Munro. After Nelson was rejected by Miss Maddern, he connected with Pamela. She killed Maddern by pushing the roses up to her in a hug, holding an old stage program from A Night to Remember so the roses would not poison her. Her plan was to go to Hollywood alone and start anew. Instead, she is arrested. Before they leave, Susan tells Reynolds her husband will give him a job, but if he insists on publishing the story about her husband's affair, she'll have him charged with blackmail. Back at home, Mattie brings out the cake she made to mark Jean's birthday. Christopher, Mattie and Blake sing in her honor. Guest cast: John Wood, Tottie Goldsmith
26	6	"Women and Children"	Karl Zwicky	Stuart Page	20 March 2015	1.012
An ambulance crew rushes a woman in pain to the hospital, but when they wheel her into the operating room, they stop short. A dead man is lying on the operating table; he is Gareth Orton, a surgeon at the hospital. Dr Blake arrives home from clearing off and placing flowers on his mother's grave, and Jean tells him he is needed at the hospital. Also, her granddaughter Amelia Jean has been born. Examining the body with Dr Alice Harvey, Blake notes that an outdated fixed-blade scalpel was used to cut the man's throat and that Orton had sexual relations shortly before his death. Hospital administrator Malcolm Beaufort tells Blake that Orton was having a relationship with Glenda Lambert, the nurse who found the body when she went to prepare the operating room. Blake and Harvey are present when Mrs Orton comes to identify her husband's body. Harvey is unusually brusque with her. Outside the morgue, Mrs. Orton tells Blake that Harvey was one of her husband's "sluts." Doug Ashby, who is visiting a friend at the hospital, tells Blake to talk with veterinarian Ron Caxton, who had refused to let Orton operate on him. Caxton tells Blake that Orton "butchered" his wife in surgery. Blake receives a letter from his daughter in China, who asks why he has not answered her letters. Blake had written to her, sent her money, and is furious that she received none of it. He confronts Charlie Davis, who tells him that Munro had said Blake was on a watch list based on his travel to China. Caxton appears at Blake's office in extreme pain with an intestinal blockage. There are no surgeons at the hospital, so Caxton insists that Blake do the surgery. Glenda Lambert assists with the operation and afterwards admits to Blake that she was in love with Orton. Munro asks Blake to accompany him to an interview, which turns out to be with Alice Harvey. The evening after the autopsy, Mrs Orton had contacted Harvey, who told her of her husband's affair with Lambert and of advances he'd made towards several women, including her. Harvey's official complaint about Orton's behavior led to disciplinary action against her, not Orton. Munro says she could be prosecuted for revealing details of an investigation to a member of the public and is a credible suspect with means and motive. With the assistance of Jean and Mattie, Blake recreates the murder scene in his kitchen and realizes that the killer must have been used to moving bodies and was very organized, along with being familiar with surgical procedures. Back at the hospital, Beaufort mentions to Blake the ambulance crew that had brought the patient into the murder scene. Mattie is cornered in the operating room by one of the ambulance crew, Lachlan Kennedy. His partner Rowley Grant steps in to stop him and begins violently beating Kennedy. Blake and Davis rush into the room, and Davis arrests Grant for Orton's murder. He had been one of the few people at the hospital who continued talking with Harvey after she had been disciplined, and the fixed-blade scalpel used to murder Orton was found in Grant's ambulance kit. Grant explains to Harvey that his father had been cruel to his mother and he wouldn't let anyone treat a woman that way. She tells him that his bad childhood cannot excuse murder. Blake offers Munro his resignation in exchange for dropping the charges against Harvey, promising a written resignation in the morning. Blake and Harvey meet at the cemetery and discuss his suspicions about the cause of his mother's death and the denial of his exhumation request. Harvey contemplates ways to investigate without exhumation and thanks Blake for the hospital's re-examination of her complaint. Back at home, Jean tells Blake of her son Christopher's request that she come help them with the baby. He co-signs her application for a loan to cover traveling expenses. Blake answers the door to see former Superintendent Matthew Lawson (Now Chief Inspector) in full uniform, who says, "I hear you resigned, is it in writing yet?" Lawson is pleased that it is not, as he will need Blake.
27	7	"Room without a View"	Declan Eames	Chelsea Cassio	27 March 2015	1.077
After talking business with Len Webster at the hotel, Henry King staggers up to his hotel room. The next morning, hotel owner Catherine Lewis tries to wake him up. His door is jammed with a chair; Len pushes to open the door. Henry appears dead. Blake joins Chief Inspector Lawson at the scene. Henry is still just alive, but he dies before Blake can administer adrenaline. Norman Baker appears, he is business partner with Len. Henry had been at an AA meeting at a church before meeting with Len; Blake goes the meeting, where Miss Lewis usually attended as did gun shop owner Errol Stott. Doug Ashby is at the hotel, looking out for his friend's daughter, Miss Lewis. He shares his observations of the hotel with Blake. Further examination of the hotel room reveals a bullet hole through the wall and a painting, and it came from the room next door, where Len spent the night. The casing is found on the floor, but there is no bullet in Henry's body. Stott provides a list of people who bought the gun matching that bullet, including Len Webster. Len says the gun went off accidentally, and he was relieved to hear that Henry died of asphyxiation, not the bullet. Mattie finds a young woman wandering on the street, and takes her to the hospital. Her injuries are tended but her short term memory is gone. Henry took to drinking heavily ten years earlier, when he was a builder and someone was killed on the job. He changed to running a hardware store. Norman Baker mentions that his younger daughter died ten years earlier, and he had a memorial for her that day. Charlie Davis and Blake ask Norman when his daughter Jessie died; she was 8 years old when the roof was being repaired by Henry. Henry took a lunch break without securing the tiles, which fell and killed the girl. Norman blames Henry for the loss of his daughter. Norman's family split apart, as his elder daughter moved away and his wife left him. Blake considers that Mattie's patient may be that elder daughter, as she came from Bendigo for the memorial of her sister's death. She clicks when they ask her if she recalls the name Norman Baker. Her name is Anna, though her father took to calling her Jessie. He comes to fetch her. Charlie finds her car, and a cushion from the hotel at that scene. Blake suggests to Anna, with her father present, that she killed Henry by staying in Henry's room after they had lunch in the hotel and suffocating him. She admits to it all, and adds details. She hid under the bed all night, slipping out when the door was open in the morning. She is arrested. Her father says he was happy to let Henry drink himself to death with the money he would get from the sale of his store, as vengeance. Superintendent Munro is angry that Blake did not submit his written resignation. Lawson shows Munro a photo of Munro and another high-ranking police officer with a well-known and wanted criminal, which puts pressure on Munro. Charlie found the photo in Munro's desk earlier and sent it to Lawson. At home, Jean tells Blake she has decided to go help her son and his wife. Guest cast: Gary Sweet
28	8	"Darkness Visible"	Declan Eames	Stuart Page	3 April 2015	1.205
Neville Franklin, the magistrate who put Tyneman's son in jail, is found murdered at his own home, with Patrick Tyneman and his son Edward in the house. After Blake says, from visual inspection of the body, that Franklin died of poison, Munro arrests Edward. In the autopsy, Alice Harvey and Blake notice the man had been held down during death, it was a painful death with limbs flailing, and they find half of a Masonic coin inside him. The poison was strychnine. Franklin was a Mason. Sergeant Davis arrives at the scene with Munro, and is sure that Munro changed something after he pushed Davis out of the room where the body was found. Jean has brought in a new receptionist and housekeeper, Evelyn Toohey, for Blake while she is away in Adelaide with her son and his wife. Patrick is concerned about his son, and asks Blake to check him out medically. Edward, still on parole, has been expelled from the Masons, by Franklin's instigation. That makes Edward angry, saying he wants to kill people. Edward's hands are shaking and he will not allow "skin on skin" contact, as Blake calls it; some effect of being in jail. As the killer did touch Franklin's skin, Blake does not believe Edward could be the killer. Dr Harvey tells Blake of the result of tests of the soil above his mother's grave, revealing the presence of strychnine, which killed Franklin, and Blake is upset that his mother died that way. Blake shows the half-coin to a Mason, Jock Clement, who says it was stolen from the lodge cabinet, and the theft had been reported to Munro. Clare Llewellyn is doing the dishes at the Masonic lodge, to help her husband, but she says she seems not to please Masons. Doug Ashby is a Mason, too, arriving for the vote of the new Worshipful Master, to replace Franklin. Mrs Toohey mistakenly cleans up Blake's office, losing his important papers. Jean is at the local hotel until the bus comes; Mattie meets her there and learns that Blake was just 10 years old when his mother died. Blake meets with Clare Llewellyn, who had been a patient of his father for her mood swings. Her husband is now Deputy Warden in the Masonic lodge. Clare did not steal the coin, and does not know who did. At the Masonic lodge, Blake looks at some of the records; then Jock Clement shows to Blake the other half of the coin that Franklin was forced to swallow. It was the coin he received at his initiation; he got the other half in the mail from a person unknown and it scares him. Jock signed a false death certificate for Blake's mother; he says she took her own life and he tells the story in detail, naming Doug Ashby as being present, among others. Clare enters the room, going after Jock with a knife, but Blake stops her. Munro arrests her, despite Blake telling him that she is not stable for interrogation; she confesses to many things that she did not do. After telling Lawson he is "surplus to requirements", Munro once again tells Blake to get out, he is fired. Blake bakes scones with Mrs Toohey's help, and brings them to Jean. He needs to talk to someone who can clear his thinking. Next morning, Blake asks Cec which man pursued his mother 40 years ago; it was Jock Clement, and Doug Ashby protected Blake's mother. Ashby puts new flowers at the grave of Blake's mother, where Blake meets him. Ashby admits to killing Franklin in revenge for Mrs Blake's murder. Clement with Franklin's aid poisoned Blake's mother 40 years ago. Munro took a diary from Franklin's room at his death, as Franklin had started writing down past stories after he fell out with Clement. Blake confronts Jock Clement with killing his mother; Clement points a gun at him. Lawson and Ashby enter the room; Ashby and Clement struggle over the gun and Ashby is shot, dying in Blake's arms. Lawson takes Clement away. At the police station, Lawson and Davis arrest Munro for tampering with evidence and other charges on the advice of the Melbourne office. Blake describes his world view, with hope in people, in sharp contrast to that of Munro, who sees guilt and deceit all around him. He and Jean have each reached a new stage in their lives. Jean boards the bus to Adelaide; Blake stops it to say a proper good-bye to her, holding her hand. Guest cast: John Wood, Rod Mullinar, John Stanton Last appearance of Douglas Ashby

=== Series 4 (2016) ===
No. overall	No. in series	Title	Directed by	Written by	Original release date	AUS viewers (million)
29	1	"The Open Road"	Declan Eames	Stuart Page	5 February 2016	1.142
Dr Lucien Blake returns home after a week away to find Ballarat hosting a very public stopover in the 1960 cross-country, endurance motor race. A young mechanic, Errol Moore, is found dead under the car of Trevor McKenzie, apparently murder. The new reporter taking photos for The Courier is Lawson's niece Rose Anderson. Back at the scene of the death, Chief Superintendent Lawson (who has recently been restored to his previous rank) pushes Charlie Davis out of the way as a car comes speeding from the garage, hitting him, bouncing him in the air and driving away. Davis does first aid to Lawson saving him from bleeding out through his severely injured leg. A debate between Blake and the hospital surgeon occurs over whether to amputate Lawson's leg. Blake tells the surgeon in the hospital that the leg can be saved, and Blake begins the procedure to save it with Mattie as the nurse. The suspects for the murder are part of the amateur car racing world, which is slowly changing to professional. Jones drove the car that hit Lawson and broke three of Davis's ribs. Herbert Jones works for the auto manufacturers to make their models drive better, or disadvantages cars from those not paying him. Bomber Denman works with Jones; Blake uses fierce methods to get Bomber, mechanic for to Trevor, to admit his use of dynamite against competitors, and to stop it. Miss Beryl Routledge, the one woman in the race and winner of the stage, has ambitions to win it, and make money in racing; she approached young Errol to join her team, as he was the best mechanic. Errol turned her down as he wanted to drive in the next year's race. Jean returns from Adelaide to see Lawson. The famed Clive Hildebrand, the second place driver of the stage who wants to stay amateur, mistakenly thought that his mechanic Errol betrayed him, so he killed him brutally. He then tries to kill Blake as Blake investigates beneath Hildebrand's car. Jean saves Blake by hitting Hildebrand with a wrench as he lowers his car onto Blake. Bill Hobart comes to arrest Hildebrand. Lawson realises that when he can walk, it will be with a stick, and he expects that means he will not pass the medical exam and says good-bye to his staff. Blake trades in the car inherited from his father, a 1930s Standard, for a new model. Jean and Blake come to terms in Adelaide but do not tell anyone else. Guest cast: John Wood; Last regular appearance of Chief Superintendent Lawson and first appearance of Rose Anderson
30	2	"Golden Years"	Declan Eames	Pete McTighe	12 February 2016	1.091
Two businessmen/brothers announce plans for a theme park to glorify Ballarat's goldrush past, with assistance from their sister. The following morning one brother is found dead in the local baths. She wanted a park like Disneyland, while one brother wanted the area preserved, like it was in his boyhood. He killed his own brother in the stream, and moved his body to the swimming pool, proved by matching the water in the lungs to the water in the stream. Chief Superintendent Frank Carlyle replaces Lawson. Mattie O'Brien leaves Ballarat for a new post at St Bartholomew's hospital, London. Blake borrows Jean's engagement ring from her first marriage to have his mother's engagement ring resized. First appearance of Chief Superintendent Carlyle and last regular appearance of Mattie O'Brien
31	3	"Lucky Numbers"	Fiona Banks	Paul Oliver	19 February 2016	1.098
Judith Chapman, the woman who won the state lottery, but did not yet get her winnings, is kidnapped. Charlie Davis takes the phone call from the kidnapper at her home, after the neighbor called the police. Her husband Laurie is the first suspect; a woman in his company tried to start an affair with him, giving the motive. She lies to everyone about her liaison, which never happened. Another employee at the company had been friends with the husband since high school. Blake finds the woman after figuring out the particular phrasing of the kidnapper to mean they were near railroad tracks. But Blake is hit on the head before he can give her the medicine she needs, or untie her. The young daughter Elizabeth of the couple goes from the care of the neighbor to her maternal grandmother Irene to Rose, who finds her at home alone, to the police, and then to Jean. When Blake is found, there is a dead hobo called Bluey next to him, killed by the kidnapper. Blake then realises that the Chapman family's business success and the lottery winnings move them to another social class and leave old friends behind; he confronts the employee who was a high school friend, who finally admits what he has done. He thinks Judith is dead, but Blake thinks she had a crisis from her lifelong disease. She is found and recovers in the hospital, surrounded by her daughter, her husband and her mother. Patrick Tyneman has given his son Edward the position of editor of The Courier; Edward seeks articles that sell more papers and had printed the address of the lottery winner. That proved unimportant in the crime. Solving the case provides Blake with the opportunity to propose to Jean just as Mei Lin, Blake's wife long reported dead (last episode of Series 1, first episode of Series 2), arrives at the front door. Guest cast: John Wood
32	4	"Against the Odds"	Fiona Banks	Stuart Page	26 February 2016	1.125
Alex Martin, a jockey dies the morning after a big win, riding around the track on a practice run. The winning horse is put down by the owner of the track, Ada McCrae. Alex was nephew to Agnes Clasby, friend to the Blake family; Alex's effects go to her. Carlyle is in debt to a bookmaker who is one of the suspects, which he states openly. He involves Blake with more interviews on this account. The second place winner runs when the police try to question him, running onto the track, run over by two other racers on the track; he dies of his wounds. Among Alex's effects is a note indicating he was asked to throw the race, and let the second place winner come in first. Many bets were placed by people in the stable assuming that would happen. A young woman at the track who favors the horses over people, starts shooting randomly; her actions bring about the denouement at the track. Alex had serious injuries from an earlier fall, and was advised not to race any more. He still wanted to win, and did win, so all those bets were lost. This was the motive for killing him, with a cable stretched across the race track at rider height. When he fell off the horse, the horse fell too, not part of the plan. Ada McCrae had that cable stretched and then removed before the police arrived. She is arrested, as Blake says, your tears were not for Alex, but for the horse. Rose is present trying to get a good story on the front page, to advance in her career at The Courier. Blake's household is strained with Jean and Mei Lin under the same roof. Mei Lin leaves to stay in a hotel and Blake puts the engagement ring away. Guest cast: Helen Morse
33	5	"The Price of Love"	John Hartley	Chelsea Cassio	4 March 2016	1.088
Merv Rogers is killed during a routine midnight training exercise; he was not part of the drill. Major Derek Alderton is in charge of the base, not a person Blake likes though he had known him since the Second World War. Leaving the base with Davis in a police car, they pursue a speeder. A young man has the car, without license plates on it; the car holds a bloody rug and a bayonet. The young man took the car as he found it with the keys in it, untended. Tracing back where the car was stolen, a partially buried body of a woman is found. That woman had been living on the base until she separated from her husband. She has penicillin in her system, which medical records show was to treat a sexually transmitted disease. The circle of friends is described by Keith Ellis, owner of the car, as sharing everything, which includes spouses, as they watch the couples at the gathering in honor of Merv. Blake then confirms this more directly in conversation with the wives, who all need to treat their disease. Rose says that a woman called her with a tip, leaving only a phone number some weeks earlier; she is the murdered woman. The woman are not pleased with this arrangement, feeling relatively powerless. They invent people to add to the military payroll and collect the money. Blake and Rose discover a break in the fence around the base, where Merv was running home, not running because he could not sleep. Blake realizes that Merv did not murder the woman, but aided in moving her body in the Ellis automobile. Daisy Rogers, his mother, killed her, and then her son and a husband buried her. When Merv knew the car was stolen, he ran back to the base, as he was due back by midnight, and got caught in the live fire exercise. Throughout this case, Blake is talking with Jean as he has become accustomed, and also meeting his wife for breakfast at the hotel, and talking with her. The newspaper covers this case at the base and writes about Mei Lin, as well as including more articles on China. Jean tells Blake not to show her affection; it is painful for her and for Mei Lin. The perfect gentleman, he says, yes, of course, as they all cope with the wife alive, back after 17 years, longer than they were together. Guest cast: John Wood
34	6	"A Difficult Lie"	John Hartley	Paul Jenner	11 March 2016	1.081
The body of sports reporter Terry Reynolds is discovered on the 18th hole at the local golf course by Superintendent Carlyle and Patrick Tyneman, as they finish a morning round of golf. Reynolds has enemies at the golf course because of his articles in The Courier. Reynolds was hired by Edward Tyneman to push out Harvey Treloar, a sportswriter hired by his grandfather. Edward instead gives him a job with the presses themselves. He was, however, thought by many to be the superior journalist. Clayton Richardson is questioned as his alibi does not hold up and he is often drunk. Jean reveals that Clayton lost his wife a year earlier. His wife hand handled the financial side of the couple's successful company, easy to tell as Clayton's mathematical inability is obvious from his difficulties on the golf course. Blake confronts Alec Richardson, son of Clayton and a lawyer. Alec hit Reynolds with a ball from the pool table, then finished killing Reynolds when he collapsed in the sand trap. He is arrested. Rose helps to uncover the secrets Reynolds had amassed by transcribing notes in shorthand for the police. Reynolds blackmailed people by agreeing to not print embarrassing stories for a payoff. Then Rose is called by a Melbourne paper, curious about how Edward is running his newspaper, including asking why he hired Reynolds and whether Edward was part of what Reynolds was doing. She makes a deal not to answer those questions and Edward Tyneman agrees to re-hire Treloar and let Rose cover more than routine topics. Articles in The Courier about Mei Lin's return strain Blake and Jean's relationship. In the last scene, Major Alderton shows up uninvited at Mei Lin's hotel room.
35	7	"For Whom the Bell Tolls"	Ian Barry	Sarah Lambert	18 March 2016	1.018
Rod Drury, a fireman, Cec Drury's brother, falls from the Ballarat Fire Station bell tower in front of Mei Lin, while the other fireman are at a nearby house fire. Mei Lin checks to learn the man is dead, when a star of David falls into her hand. She runs off when a car's headlights blind her. What first appears to be suicide turns into a murder investigation with partial fingerprints from the killer. A black substance on Rod's hands is challenging to identify. Mr Kirby is one suspect, for the boot black he puts on his hair and a fight at a military club some months earlier, broken up by Major Alderton. Rod was injured in an earlier fire and is still not fully healed, so he did not answer the house fire call, but he did pursue the second tolling of the bell, which led to his murder. When Cec tells Blake that he saw Mrs Blake near the Club, Blake asks her what she saw, and she explains what she saw and how she took the star of David unawares when she fled the scene. Mr Theodore Rowe, one of the firemen, lost his warehouse in an earlier fire; the house fire was at the home of his cousin. Mick Lancaster, captain of the fireman, gives no fingerprints because his fingers are burned. In the earlier fire, Rod saw a man in the warehouse before he himself was hit by a falling beam. Since that warehouse fire, Rod pieced together, and so does Blake, that Eli Rosen, a Russian-Jewish immigrant was sleeping rough in the warehouse and died in the fire, unreported. The star belonged to him. The black substance proves to be naphthalene dust, and there are smoke balls to make smoke at the house fire; it was a set-up scene, all the smoke. Blake calls the firemen to the station to explain Rowe's arson fire for insurance and killing Rod for figuring it out. It was Lancaster who returned to the station and tolled the bell, killed Rod, and returned to the house fire. Later he burned his hands to avoid giving fingerprints. Bill Hogan, also a volunteer fireman, arrests Mick Lancaster. Rose brings pictures to Jean of Mei Lin arguing with Major Alderton and Jean overhears him threatening her. Mei Lin confesses to Blake what happened to her in a camp in Hong Kong, horrid scars, and that Alderton found her in the camp a year earlier; he brought her to Australia. He threatens her and their daughter so that Alderton can reach Blake. Derek Alderton has Sergeant Hannam with him all the time. Blake confesses his true feelings to Jean, and promises to set things straight.
36	8	"The Visible World"	Ian Barry	Stuart Page	25 March 2016	1.059
Blake takes a pistol to the Ballarat observatory on the day of an eclipse to meet Major Alderton. The Major is using Mei Lin to force Blake to return to the army for service in the growing Indo-China war and Blake will not be forced. As the sky darkens during the eclipse Alderton is stabbed in front of Blake, but the murderer is not known. The operator of the Observatory is suspected, as is Blake. Sullivan from the Special Branch of the military arrives to supervise the investigation by the police into Alderton's murder. He is a cocky man, with an almost lunatic grin. Sergeant Robert Hannam was seen entering the observatory and seen leaving it in a green Studebaker by Rose. He is a dangerous hit man for the military, who says he was present in case anything went awry between Alderton and Blake. A sharp instrument is found in Mei Lin's room at the hotel, and Blake is arrested on the evidence of that being the murder weapon. Jean and Mei Lin are visited by Hannam, so they stay at a local hotel for safety. Dr Harvey tells the police that the murder weapon is a finely measured bit of equipment from a complex machine. Blake realises that is the large telescope, which Charlie confirms when he visits Dr Joanna Bainbridge at the observatory. She is rattled as Hannam had been to visit her not long before Charlie arrives. From his cell in Ballarat, Blake works on solving the murder, based on the simple geometry of the event. Sullivan shows Blake the file former Superintendent Munro kept on him, and then asks Blake how many he killed in his time in Special Branch and how he can stand to be away from that life? Blake names the two men he killed and assures Sullivan that he is happy as a country doctor. Superintendent Carlyle and Sullivan say the next step for Blake is going to the Melbourne office of Special Branch. This is a ploy by Blake and Carlyle to flush out the murderer, but only they know this. Mei Lin confesses to get Blake released, with true details about how Alderton pursued and threatened her to get to Blake, as well how she committed the murder. She is put in the cell and Blake is released. While Hannam visits Blake and Jean at their house, and explains Alderton's mistakes and unreliability, Carlyle shows up at the house. Hannam slips away, and Blake becomes aware that Mei Lin was flushed out with her false confession. They race to the cell, saving her from Sullivan, the murderer of Alderton, who is trying to hang her. Sullivan is arrested. Mei Lin asks Blake how he and Alderton stopped being good friends. The two were in a brutal camp and it broke Alderton's will to live, but Blake kept him alive, and Blake thinks Alderton never forgave him for that. The military police arrive to escort Sullivan away. He, in turn, is murdered by Hannam. Carlyle pushes Hannam down to stop him from shooting and he is arrested. Carlyle arranges for Mei Lin to meet her family safely in Hong Kong, which she accepts, as it is time to start a new life. When Blake and Jean are finally alone, they kiss.

=== Series 5 (2017) ===
No. overall	No. in series	Title	Directed by	Written by	Original release date	AUS viewers (million)
37	1	"A Lethal Combination"	Ian Barry	Paul Oliver	17 September 2017	0.929
An exhibition boxing match in Ballarat turns sour when boxer Mickey Ellis dies in front of hundreds of witnesses. Superintendent Frank Carlyle is away in Melbourne due to his gambling debts. Lawson appears and takes his place after the investigation has begun. The cause of death is difficult to determine, but it is soon clear that it was not a punch from his opponent, Ray Davis, younger brother of Charlie. Charlie has been working to support his mother and brother, and his brother is not getting on with him. His mother is dating Bernie Thompson, the man who manages Ray. Charlie's late father, a policeman, had arrested Bernie years earlier for fraud, so Charlie is not quick to believe Bernie has his family's best interests at heart. The police find Flanagan's van. Two points of interest: Mickey was a wild man and a trail of gypsum leads to the body of Sean Flanagan, the cornerman for Ray, killed by Mickey. Gus Jansons, the manager of the arena and coach for Mickey, assisted in the burial at a closed agricultural store yard. Mickey died of poison in his petroleum jelly applied before the fight by Gus, entering his bloodstream when an old wound opens during the fight. The aconite poison was extracted from flowers in the garden of Mickey's fiancée Tracey Corelli. Gus is charged, Ray is cleared, and he and his brother are on better terms. Charlie and Rose have an argument over the story she wrote about Mickey's death. Last regular appearance of Chief Superintendent Carlyle and reintroduction of Chief Superintendent Lawson
38	2	"Sorrow Songs"	Ian Barry	David Hannam	24 September 2017	0.903
The murder of a beautiful woman takes Blake inside the intriguing and exotic world of Romani travellers passing through Ballarat. Rose is photographing the wedding of Afina at the camp, part of her story about the Romani. As the leaves, she stops at the group of caravans, finding a door open and the body of Nadya Draghici, sister of the bride, inside. Tamas and Nadya planned to run away the night of the wedding and settle in Sydney, as her father does not approve of him. There is a struggle in the camp the next day as Afina is burning Nadya's suitcase, but the police, including Ned Simmons and Charlie, consider she is destroying evidence, and take the suitcase. It shows her intention to be with Tamas. Edward Tyneman is one suspect and Tamas is another. The autopsy results and a toy dropped at the camp lead to a sometime employer of Tamas, Dean Charles. His wife Libby murdered Nadya, jealous that her husband visited her, sure he was having an affair. Libby failed to learn that her husband was buying pine bark solution, a remedy to aid in their wish to have a second child. Libby is arrested. Rose and Charlie make up.
39	3	"The Call of the Void"	Alister Grierson	Victoria Madden	1 October 2017	0.884
A French chef Philippe is found murdered in the freezer of his restaurant, when Jean and Doctor Blake are hoping to have dinner there. The evening before, officers Bill Hobart and Ned Simmons had raided his home, based on a tip of possible homosexual activity from the local butcher, Mr Robinson. They find him alone and the raid becomes violent, with Hobart hitting Philippe hard. The autopsy slowly reveals three sets of injuries to the chef, and the fatal one was a blow to the head. A button from a police uniform was collected in the freezer with the dead body. Robinson's daughter Tilly takes cod liver oil from Jean's kitchen, which Blake realizes will not help her but hurt her. They find her collapsed and send her to the hospital. She reveals her relationship with Philippe, who is not homosexual, and that she was at the restaurant the evening Philippe was killed, seeing a light there. She didn't see anyone as her father had already left after punching Philippe. Superintendent Lawson is angry with Hobart, as it is his uniform button found in the freezer. Henry Dent owns the restaurant and shared his lodgings with Philippe. He tells of the argument they had after the police raid and Philippe's absences from home with Tilly. He shares that Philippe carried the police officer's uniform button with him, meaning to complain to the police about the raid, which removes Hobart from suspicion of murder. Philippe had hepatitis, which closes the restaurant for a few days to test the patrons for the disease. Blake realizes what the piece of shell is, and confronts the sous-chef Mrs Cornish at the closed restaurant, finding her stealing liquor. She was found in the same activity by Philippe the night he was killed. Philippe was at the restaurant to meet a delivery. Mrs Cornish became angry and struck him with a frozen leg of lamb, the third and fatal blow. Hobart and Charlie have bad feelings between them. Jean invites Lawson to stay with them, which he accepts.
40	4	"All She Leaves Behind"	Alister Grierson	Stuart Page	8 October 2017	0.961
Controversial writer Patricia Neville has returned to her old hometown, writing a new novel that bases its characters on the local people of Ballarat. The book reading at the local library quickly descends into screaming and chaos. She is found dead the next morning with her sister Eve unconscious beside her, seeming to be a murder-suicide that was not completed. Blake searches out truths about the sisters, finding Patricia had been cursed with fatal breast cancer. Patricia was poisoned and did not die of the cancer or the treatment for it. Charlie's careful search of evidence at the scene finds a chip of nail polish matching the angry librarian, who had wanted approval from Patricia for her own writing. She had shared short stories with her but never received any approval. The poison ruined Patricia's behaviour with others before killing her. The male neighbour who loved Eve brought over gin laced with thallium, thinking that Eve never drank alcohol, and that Patricia was a horrible annoyance. Yet Eve did drink when no one was around, and so did Patricia's agent. Doctor Blake tells both of them of the antidote. Jean speaks with Father Emery, who is firm on canon law and remarriage after divorce. Blake learns that his wife is unwilling to sue for divorce as the current law requires her to name an adulterer, which Mei Lin will not do. Blake has more options, but he and Jean like none of them. Constable Ned Simmons learns to be helpful to the detectives.
41	5	"Measure Twice"	Daina Reid	Paul Jenner	15 October 2017	1.024
When Blake is called to investigate the murder of a retired carpenter Vernon Armstrong, his first suspect is Ethan Young, a young Jehovah's Witness, who was discovered praying over the body and covered in blood by Vern's niece Florence and her husband Trent Bowman. The police interview Ethan and, despite his pleas of innocence, there is some secret he will not reveal. They learn that Vern has won a lot of cash at cards in an illegal gambling game at a local bakery and cafe, generating enemies. Florence works at the bakery as she and Trent are too often short of money. Trent is in debt to Vern and under suspicion. Charlie and Blake find Ethan attacked at his work site, with the weapon still in his chest, and he is saved by surgery. Superintendent Lawson shuts down the gambling. Ethan's mother reveals that her son helped Vern with paperwork, as Vern could not read or write. Blake searches Vern's workshop, realizing the man's excellent memory (probably how he won the card games), and finds plans for a portable electric drill, which Percy Walker, a plumber and Vern's former partner, is also seeking. It will be a valuable patented device. Vern had parted ways from Percy and was using Ethan to fill out the patent forms. Percy attacks Blake, penetrating his chest with a chisel and nearly killing him. Blake drains his own lung before he passes out, seeing a man in the shadows. Blake wakes up in the hospital with Jean at his bedside. Percy is charged with Vern's murder and two attempted murders.
42	6	"First Dance"	Daina Reid	Eloise Healey	22 October 2017	1.086
When teenager Charlotte dies in the dressing room of the debutante ball, Blake does his best to investigate though he is still recovering from being stabbed weeks before. Her story is revealed by the autopsy. She is badly treated by two girls, Sally Murphy and her friend Christine, who had assaulted her with foods forced down her throat while she was bound to a chair, as well as other schemes that left their marks. They had a plan for her on the stage before the dance started, but she was killed before the hairy spiders were released. Charlotte's father is principal of her school. Rose Anderson is good friends with one teacher at the school, who was aware of the bullying but did not intervene, just as Charlotte's father failed to protect his daughter. Jean notices the scent of a particular perfume on Charlotte's ball dress. Charlotte did not wear perfume, but her teacher, Kim Fox, did. The teacher was having an affair with the boy who was Charlotte's escort to the ball, and she is arrested for that. Charlie arrests the girls who assaulted Charlotte. Blake then visits the flower shop of Helen Murphy, the mother of Sally. He realizes she had grown up at the hospital but had no chance for medical school. Instead, she was the local backroom abortionist, and Charlotte planned to announce that at the ball in revenge. Helen designed a flower headband for Charlotte and used a piece of wire on it as her murder weapon, and she is charged with the murder. In flashback images, we see Blake putting an envelope in the post box, which he recalls as he and Jean talk about their future, and making decisions together. It seems the doctor decided to file the divorce papers and has not told Jean yet.
43	7	"A Good Drop"	Fiona Banks	Paul Jenner	29 October 2017	1.060
Edward Tyneman comes on to Rose, bringing a picnic to show her farmland he is buying. It is the week before Christmas, and Blake investigates the murder of Daryl Fitzpatrick, a local farmer shot to death at point blank range. Angelo Colonna and Norman Baker are business partners wanting to start a winery with a new purchase of land. They were turned down as buyers by the owner, Daryl, in favor of buyer Edward Tyneman. Daryl was found dead after the fire on the land was put out. Colonna and Baker started the fire, which also ruined the topsoil. Baker is angry at Blake, blaming him for the death of his younger daughter Anna, who killed herself in prison while she was being held for a murder she committed (Series 3, Episode 7). Baker has closed his gun store and is planning to leave town. Edward Tyneman makes a scandal of Blake's request for divorce, on the basis of his drinking, in the evening newspaper. Rose rejects Edward's advances firmly but politely. He puts Rose's byline on the offensive article and then fires her. Blake punches Edward for writing about his family. Jean learns that the divorce was filed via the newspaper. Jean speaks again with Father Emery, as she assesses what she leaves behind if she goes ahead with the marriage. He stands firm and rigid on the canon law of the Catholic Church. Lionel Taylor is a neighbour to the Fitzpatricks, and Blake suspects that the Fitzpatrick son, Kevin, may well be Lionel's son. Lionel confesses to having been intimate with Eileen Fitzpatrick years earlier. The autopsy moves slowly, first confused by a sample of dog's blood, resolved when Officer Ned Simmons brings the wounded dog in. The autopsy reveals that Daryl was not killed by a shotgun alone. Blake realizes that Kevin shot Daryl with a 0.22 caliber rifle, and Lionel added a shot from his shotgun so Kevin would not go to jail. Both men are arrested. Mei Lin writes to say she agrees to a quiet divorce. In the closing scene, Cec serves a drink to William Munro, back in town. Guest cast: Gary Sweet, Craig Hall
44	8	"Hear the Angels Sing"	Fiona Banks	Stuart Page	5 November 2017	1.028
Ballarat police are shocked when young policeman Ned Simmons is found brutally murdered at night in the station, his neck broken, files and paperwork strewn all over the office, a police gun stolen. Blake finds an engagement ring near Ned's desk, which Blake shows to Ned's girlfriend, Amy Kingham. She is being stalked by violent prior boyfriend Walter Gregan and has been afraid to speak. Superintendent Lawson tells Blake he is discharged from the police for past misbehavior and current bad press on Ballarat police. Simmons was to testify in a few days with evidence against Gregan, who bribed police at another station, so he is the first suspect in this murder. An attempt is made to kill Doctor Blake, but suspended superintendent William Munro takes the fatal bullet instead. Jean tells Father Emery that she is leaving the church because it will not allow her to marry again. She goes to the cemetery where her first husband is buried to think over her decisions, where she is confronted by Norman Baker, using that police gun, a man who blames Blake for the suicide death of his daughter in prison (she murdered the man who the family blamed for her younger sister's death, in Series 3, Episode 7). Blake finds them in the cemetery and tries to protect Jean. Lawson arrives to resolve the situation as Blake makes a full apology for his own mistakes. Baker is arrested as he killed both Simmons and Munro and attacked Charlie at the morgue, all in his furious pursuit of Blake. At the police station, Edward Tyneman insists he wants justice for Blake punching him. Patrick Tyneman follows his son into the station and fires him as editor of the local newspaper for all the trouble he is making. Patrick then says to let Miss Anderson know she can have her job back. The episode closes with a Christmas meal at the Blake home, toasting those who are no longer with them. Jean and Lucien set a date for their wedding. Guest cast: John Wood, Craig Hall, Annie Jones and Gary Sweet

=== Telemovie (2017) ===
No. overall	No. in series	Title	Directed by	Written by	Original release date	AUS viewers (million)
45	1	"Family Portrait"	Ian Barry	Paul Jenner	12 November 2017	1.070
Edward Tyneman's wedding night ends in his murder. Blake's aunt Dorothy, estranged from the Blakes since his father married, asks him to track down her granddaughter, Catherine Lucas. Jean's nephew Danny Parks, police officer in Melbourne, helps in Ballarat to solve the murder. In Melbourne, Blake goes to Catherine's address and discovers a dead woman in the cellar. The Melbourne police determine her cause of death and her true identity. Edward's father Patrick cannot bear the loss of his son and pulls strings to get Blake re-instated with the police, believing he will find the murderer of his son. Tyneman has high blood pressure. Milton Dunne, father of Harriet, Edward's new bride, is found murdered by a blow to the head. Investigations in Melbourne reveal that Milton was not Harriet's father; they were partners in scams of older people living in nursing homes. In the course of that, they met Catherine, who was quite ill. Milton killed Harriet's sister Evie, leaving her to die in Catherine's cellar. Harriet reveals that she is pregnant with Edward's child, which brings her closer to her mother-in-law Susan. Patrick Tyneman is found dead in a car, in the water. The autopsy reveals he died naturally and then lost control of the vehicle. A new young waitress, Roslyn, at the club catches Blake's eye, as she shows signs of the same heart disease that runs in the Tyneman family and wears a bracelet with sapphires. Blake had found a sapphire stone in the fountain where Edward died. With Lawson present, Blake confronts Roslyn who admits her father is Patrick Tyneman, and that her anger was directed at Edward. Thus she murdered her half-brother and then Milton, because he was blackmailing her. Blake and Jean hunt for Catherine in care homes until they can bring her to Ballarat, near her grandmother. Blake learns that his father was the barrier to family reconciliation after his mother died, and is easier with his aunt Dorothy. Lucien and Jean have a happy wedding, with Lawson and his niece Rose (Anna McGahan) standing up for them. Returning from their four month honeymoon, they set their bags down in the house, and Lawson is there, calling Blake back to work.
46	2	"Ghost Stories"	Ian Barry	Paul Jenner	30 November 2018	N/A
Newspaper editor Martin Carver (Tom Wren) publishes the first two articles in a series on Ballarat's most famous unsolved crimes. A group of Boy Scouts then discovers two bizarre murders mimicking the crimes. Chief Superintendent Lawson, Sgt. Bill Hobart, Constable Peter Crowe, and new police surgeon Dr. Alice Harvey investigate. With Dr. Lucien Blake missing and presumed dead, Jean Blake nevertheless finds herself involved after both deceased are linked to her. Lawson tries to keep Jean out of it, but then the third article in the newspaper series is published and a third victim dies. Carver pledges to publish a fourth article, and Jean and Lawson's team race to prevent another death.

In the UK, the first telemovie (episode number 45) was broadcast in two parts as episodes 9 and 10 of series 5 on 24 and 25 May 2018.

== Ratings ==
The Doctor Blake Mysteries : AUS viewers per episode (thousands)

Season	Episode number									
Season	1	2	3	4	5	6	7	8	9	10
1	1176	935	1131	1095	1088	1021	836	948	969	1045
2	1117	1011	914	1111	1020	1002	1101	1069	1083	1060
3	1174	1063	1156	1103	1117	1012	1077	1205	–	
4	1142	1091	1098	1125	1088	1081	1018	1059	–	
5	929	903	884	961	1024	1086	1060	1028	–	

Source: Audience measurement performed by OzTam
