= The Doctor Blake Mysteries =

Australian television crime drama series

- Also known as: The Blake Mysteries
- Genre: Mystery; Crime; Period drama
- Created by: George Adams; Tony Wright
- Starring: Craig McLachlan; Nadine Garner; Rick Donald; Cate Wolfe; Joel Tobeck; Charlie Cousins
- Composer: Dale Cornelius
- Country of origin: Australia
- Original language: English
- No. of series: 5
- No. of episodes: 45 (list of episodes)

Production
- Executive producers: Tony Wright; Carole Sklan; Christopher Gist
- Producer: George Adams
- Production location: Australia
- Running time: 1 hour (56–59 mins) + telemovie
- Production company: December Media

Original release
- Network: ABC (2013–2017); Seven Network (2018)
- Release: 1 February 2013 – 12 November 2017

The Doctor Blake Mysteries (also The Blake Mysteries) is an Australian television series that premiered on ABC TV on 1 February 2013 at 8:30 pm. The series stars Craig McLachlan in the lead role of Dr. Lucien Blake, who returns home to Ballarat, 120 km west of Melbourne, in the late 1950s to take over his late father's general medical practice and role as police surgeon after an absence of 30 years. Five series aired as of 2017, with a telemovie to close the program at the completion of the fifth season.

In October 2017, the Seven Network announced they acquired production rights for 2018. Producers later announced production would be suspended pending outcome of the police investigation of the sexual assault allegations directed at McLachlan.

In April 2018, Seven Network announced a series of sequel telemovies including much of the Blake series cast except McLachlan. The sequel series was still to be called The Blake Mysteries despite the absence of the title character, who in the series chronology was said to be missing and presumed dead.

After a single telemovie, titled The Blake Mysteries: A New Beginning and aired on 30 November 2018, producers ruled out making any further telemovies in 2019.

== Original broadcasts ==
The series is produced by Tony Wright and George Adams. A fifth series was commissioned as the final season of the programme, followed by a telemovie to end the series in 2017. It was anticipated that the fifth series would air from April 2017, but instead commenced in September, so that the movie-length finale could be shown at the close of the series with no gap.

== Synopsis ==
Dr. Lucien Blake left Australia in his 20s to study medicine in Scotland. Following a posting at a London hospital, he joined the British Army as a medical officer. During World War II, Blake's service included the Far East, where he fell in love with and married a Chinese woman, and had a child. However, at the fall of Singapore, he lost sight of both of them. He searched for them all the time he was away, and continues the search after he arrives in Ballarat. Blake also spent time in Thailand's Ban Pong POW camp. After a 33-year absence, Blake returned home in 1959 to take over his late father's practice as a medical general practitioner and also becomes the Ballarat area police surgeon.

Jean Beazley is Blake's receptionist and housekeeper. Having previously served in the same capacity for his father, Beazley has difficulty adjusting to Blake's eccentric and sometimes oblivious behaviour; although considered old-fashioned in her ideas about womanhood, she occasionally challenges Blake's expectation that she wait on him hand and foot. Her husband died in the war and she is aware that her living with the unattached Blake is a source of gossip. Shrewd and observant, her maternal tendencies are often a source of annoyance to her nephew, Constable Danny Parks, whom she treats like a son, and lodger Mattie O'Brien, whose outgoing attitude she does not understand at all. When Parks moves out, police sergeant Charlie Davis becomes a lodger in the house.

== Cast ==
=== Main / recurring ===
- Craig McLachlan as Dr. Lucien Blake
- Nadine Garner as Jean Beazley
- Cate Wolfe as Matilda "Mattie" O'Brien (Series 1–4.2)
- Joel Tobeck as Chief Superintendent (later Chief Inspector) Matthew Lawson (Series 1–4.1, 5)
- Rick Donald as Constable (later Sergeant) Daniel Parks (Series 1, 5)
- Sara Gleeson as Joy McDonald (Series 1–2.1)
- Charlie Cousins as Constable (later Sergeant) Charlie Davis (Series 2–5)
- Belinda McClory as Alice Harvey (Series 2–5)
- John Wood as Patrick Tyneman (Series 1–5)
- Craig Hall as Chief Supt William Munro (Series 3, 5)
- John Stanton as Douglas Ashby (Series 1–3)
- Neil Pigot as Major Derek Alderton (Series 1, 4)
- David Whiteley as Sergeant Bill Hobart
- Ian Rooney as Cec Drury
- Lee Beckhurst as Edward Tyneman (Series 1–5)
- Rodger Corser as Chief Supt Frank Carlyle (Series 4)
- Anna McGahan as Rose Anderson (Series 4–5)
- Ling-Hsueh Tang as Mei Lin Blake (Series 4)
- Mark Mitchell as Harvey Treloar
- Tom Wren as Martin Carver ("Ghost Stories" Telemovie)

=== Guests ===
- Alison Whyte as Monika Goodman (1 episode)
- Andrew Blackman as Miles McLaren (1 episode)
- Andrew S. Gilbert as Martin Callow (1 episode)
- Angourie Rice as Lisa Wooton (1 episode)
- Anita Hegh as Susan Wooten (1 episode)
- Annie Jones as Billie Bentley (1 episode)
- Axle Whitehead as Len Webster (1 episode)
- Cameron Daddo as Howard McArthur (1 episode)
- Debra Lawrance as Marjorie Gilmore (1 episode)
- Diana Glenn as Valerie Foster (1 episode)
- Ditch Davey as Llewellyn Sullivan (1 episode)
- Emily Taheny as Audrey Young (1 episode)
- Freya Stafford as Sarah Alexander (1 episode)
- Gary Sweet as Norman Baker (3 episodes)
- Geoff Paine as Noel Foster (1 episode)
- Greg Stone as Professor Worthington
- Gyton Grantley as Don Roper (1 episode)
- Helen Morse as Agnes Clasby (3 episodes)
- Ian Bliss as Keith Morrissey (1 episode)
- Jacek Koman as Miroslav Gorski (1 episodes)
- Jack Finsterer as Lyle Townsend (1 episode)
- Jane Allsop as Ruth Dempster (1 episode)
- Jane Clifton as Sister Josephine (1 episode)
- Jeremy Stanford as Herbert Goodman (1 episode)
- Axle Whitehead as Alexandru Draghici (1 episode)
- John Waters as Bernie Thompson (1 episode)
- Julie Nihill as Maggie Butson (1 episode)
- Kaiya Jones as Robyn Dawson (1 episode)
- Kestie Morassi as Elaine Greenslade (1 episode)
- Kevin Harrington as Donald McAvoy (1 episode)
- Laurence Breuls as Terry Reynolds (2 episodes)
- Louise Siversen as Rosemary Morrissey (1 episode)
- Mark Mitchell as Harvey Treloar (1 episode)
- Marta Kaczmarek as Klara Krol (1 episode)
- Martin Sacks as Martin O'Brien (1 episode)
- Matt Hetherington as Alan Coleman (1 episode)
- Matthew Dyktynski as Dr Kenneth Laine (1 episode)
- Michala Banas as Joyce Ellis (1 episode)
- Nell Feeney as Pamela Gilchrist (1 episode)
- Nicholas Bell as Professor Robert Waterman (1 episode)
- Paul Denny as Mick Lancaster (1 episode)
- Penne Hackforth-Jones as Nell Clasby (2 episodes)
- Petra Yared as Beryl Routledge (1 episode)
- Robert Menzies as Mr Michaels (1 episode)
- Rod Mullinar as Jock Clement (1 episode)
- Sean Scully as Lloyd Wellman (1 episode)
- Socratis Otto as Clive Churchill (1 episode)
- Sibylla Budd as Martha Harris (1 episode)
- Tom Budge as Walter Gregan (1 episode)
- Tom Burlinson as Richard Taylor (1 episode)
- Tony Nikolakopoulos as Nick Manos (1 episode)
- Tottie Goldsmith as Jacqueline Maddern (1 episode)
- Victoria Thaine as Dawn Prentice (1 episode)
- Vincent Gil as Clarence 'Clarrie' Porter (1 episode)

== Production ==
The Doctor Blake Mysteries is produced by Melbourne-based December Media in association with Film Victoria and ABC Television, which also broadcasts it in Australia on ABC. The international sales are handled by British ITV Studios Global Entertainment.

The series is set and mostly filmed in the gold rush city of Ballarat, in Victoria. It features Lydiard Street and many of the heritage buildings, including the Colonists Club, of which Blake is a member. External shots of the house and studio formerly owned by the muralist Napier Waller, in Melbourne, are used as a backdrop to represent Blake's house.

The fourth series began airing on 5 February 2016. In March 2017, it was announced that the programme would be ending, with a television-movie airing after season five. Filming of the fifth season began in August 2016, then recommenced in August 2017 for filming of the movie-length finale. The fifth series began airing on 17 September 2017.

== Broadcast ==
It premiered in the United Kingdom on 25 November 2013 on BBC One. It is also shown by a number of other European TV channels and in New Zealand. The series airs on selected Public Broadcasting Service (PBS) stations in the United States. For streaming video, Series 1-5 are all on BritBox in the US as of 2020. It was added to the schedule of the American network Ovation in the middle of 2022. The series is also available to watch on Amazon Prime Video.

== Episodes ==
Series	Episodes	Originally released		
Series	Episodes	First released	Last released	Network
1	10	1 February 2013	5 April 2013	ABC
2	10	7 February 2014	11 April 2014	ABC
3	8	13 February 2015	3 April 2015	ABC
4	8	5 February 2016	25 March 2016	ABC
5	8	17 September 2017	5 November 2017	ABC
Telemovie		12 November 2017		ABC

== Sequel ==
In October 2017, the Seven Network announced that they had acquired production rights for 2018. However, after the allegations against McLachlan, a sequel series, later titled The Blake Mysteries, was proposed by the Seven Network and supported by Screen Australia. The series would open with a telemovie, similar in length to the finale that closed the five seasons of The Doctor Blake Mysteries. With McLachlan defending sexual harassment charges during 2019, he and his character would be written out of the sequel, which (in the internal chronology of the series) would begin three years after the end of the previous series finale. Most of the rest of the cast would return for the new series, with Blake disappearing in mysterious circumstances, and his new bride Beazley to take on a more central role.

The series of four telemovies was subsequently reduced to a single telemovie, titled The Blake Mysteries: A New Beginning, which aired on 30 November 2018. It featured Garner, Tobeck, McClory, Whiteley and Rooney returning to their roles alongside new cast Tom Wren as Martin Carver, Emma Annand as Amy Parks and Joshua Orpin as Constable Peter Crowe. Seven ruled out further telemovies in 2019.

== Awards and nominations ==
Year	Award	Category	Nominee	Result
2014	Logie Awards	Most Outstanding Actor	Craig McLachlan	Nominated
2015	Logie Awards	Most Popular Actor	Craig McLachlan	Nominated
2016	Logie Awards	Best Actor	Craig McLachlan	Nominated

== Home media ==
DVD title	Episodes	Aspect ratio	Running time	Region 1	Region 2	Region 4
Series One	10	16:9	570 minutes	26 April 2016	9 December 2013	24 April 2013
Series Two	10	16:9	570 minutes	30 September 2016	30 March 2015	9 June 2014
Series Three	8	16:9	570 minutes	3 January 2017	8 January 2016	30 April 2015
Series Four	8	16:9	450 minutes	16 January 2018	30 January 2017	5 May 2016
Series Five	8	16:9	450 minutes	15 January 2019	January 2018	June 2017
