= Switched On Set =

Australian magazine style television show (1972–73)

Switched On Set is a ABC magazine style television program for 9 to 14 year-olds in Australia. Beginning in 1972 its initial presenters were Ken James, Lex Marinos and Ann Stone. Later presenters included Brendon Lunney and Marty Rhone.
