= Lynda Keane =

Australian actress (born 1950)

- Born: c. 1950; England
- Other name: Linda Keane
- Occupations: Producer; film and television actress; acting coach; talent school founder
- Years active: 1960–1979; 1997–2010
- Spouse: Greg Anderson (m. 1970)
- Children: Brooke
- Website: www.keanekids.com

Lynda Keane (born 1950), is an English-born Australian producer, film and television actress and acting coach.

Keane guest starred on numerous television series during the 1960s and 70s, most notably Bellbird, Homicide, Number 96, The Box, and Prisoner.

She is an acting tutor, who founded her own talent school, called the Lynda Keane Talent School with her husband Greg Anderson as well as the affiliated Keane Kids Management, Keane Kids Studio and Lynda Keane Studios. Among its students have included Brooke Mikey Anderson, Brett Blewitt, Brett Climo, Alyssa Jane Cook, Jamie Croft, Bree Desborough, Gavin Harrison, Matthew Krok, Toni Pearen, Paul Begaud, Charli Robinson, Ben Unwin, Kym Valentine, Nikki Webster, Kristy Wright, Dominic, Sebastian and Rebekah Elmaloglou.

== Early acting career ==
Keane began her career as a child actor in London, performing professionally since she was 15 months old, before her family emigrated to Australia when she was ten. Her parents, at that time, owned and operated one of London's leading talent schools.

She continued her career there starring in the 1960 children's series The Adventures of the Terrible Ten and its sequel The Ten Again in 1963. She also guest starred on Bellbird, Hey You and Homicide between 1967 and 1969, appearing on the latter series several times.

In 1970, she married her childhood sweetheart musician Greg Anderson. Keane also began to have a more active career during the 1970s with roles on The Rovers (1970), Number 96 (1972) and several appearances on Division 4 and Matlock Police.

She played a regular role in serial The Box as Barbie Gray (later Barbie Cook) from February 1974 until early 1975. She had a minor role in the television movie The Hotline (1974) as well as one-time appearances on King's Men (1976) and The Outsiders (1976).

== Talent school ==
She began to cut back on acting to concentrate on her career as a producer and acting teacher. In 1975, with her husband Greg Anderson, she opened "Gala Productions" and the "Lynda Keane Talent School" a year later. Her success with the school would also lead to the Keane Kids Management, the Keane Kids Studio and the Lynda Keane Studios. In November 1979, she traveled to New York with a group of her students, whose ages ranged between 8 and 16 years old, where they performed songs, dancing and acting performances to raise money for refugees. Keane, according to the Sydney Morning Herald, hoped to raise as much as $50,000.

== Acting roles ==
Keane was cast in Prisoner as Denise "Blossom" Crabtree in 1979. Her character was introduced as the mistress of Fred Ferguson, estranged husband of prison inmate Monica Ferguson. This was followed by a guest role in Neighbours in 1998.

Keane did not make an acting appearance for 15 years. During this time she and her partner Anderson helped train many child actors of the 1980s and 90s through their talent school. In 1997, she returned to acting with minor roles in the drama film The Castle and the police drama Blue Heelers. From 2000 to 2005, she also made television guest appearances on Stingers, The Secret Life of Us, Short Cuts and MDA.

== Filmography ==
=== Film ===
Year	Title	Role	Type
1977	The F.J. Holden	Raelene	Feature film
1997	The Castle	Federal Court lawyer	Feature film

=== Television ===
Year	Title	Role	Type
1960	The Adventures of the Terrible Ten aka The Terrific Adventures Of The Terrible Ten	Regular role	TV series, 51 episodes
1963	The Ten Again	Regular role	TV series
1966-1974	Homicide	Guest roles: Helen Dunn / Barbara Riley / Maureen Walker / Swimming Student / Pamela / Julie White / Fiona Norton	TV series, 7 episodes
1967	Hey You!	Guest role	TV series, 1 episode "The Visit"
1967-1971	Bellbird	Regular role: Ruth Grossark	ABC TV series, 466 episodes
1970	The Rovers	Guest role: Susie	TV series, 1 episode
1972-1975	Matlock Police	Guest roles: Nancy Randall / Cathy Gallagher / Anne Brandon / Bernice Green	TV series, 4 episodes
1972	Number 96	Recurring Guest role: Anne Spencer	TV series
1973	Division 4	Guest roles: Debbie Regan / Dulcie Jackson / Rosalie Ward	TV series, 3 episodes
1974	The Hotline	Lead role (as Linda Keane)	TV film
1974	The Box	Regular role: Barbie Gray / Barbie Cook (as Linda Keane)	TV series, 102 episodes
1975	Until Tomorrow	Recurring role	TV series
1976	King's Men	Guest role	TV series, 1 episode "Suffer Little Children"
1976	The Outsiders	Guest role: Nurse	ABC TV series AUSTRALIA/GERMANY, 1 episode
1977	The Young Doctors	Recurring role: Bubbles Gerrard	TV series, 5 episodes
1977	Cop Shop	Guest role: Brenda	TV series, 1 episode
1979	Prisoner	Denise Crabtree / Blossom Crabtree	TV series, 5 episodes
1997	Blue Heelers	Guest role: Citizen 1	TV series, 1 episode
1998	Neighbours	Guest role: Meryl Tanner	TV series, 1 episode
2000	Stingers	Guest role: Shopper	TV series, 1 episode
2001	The Secret Life Of Us	Guest role: Mrs. Lizens (as Linda Keane)	TV series, 1 episode
2002	Short Cuts	Guest role: Amy Sedaris	TV series, 1 episode
2005	MDA	Guest role: Plaintiff	ABC TV series, 1 episode
2010	Tangle	Guest role: Xavier	TV series, 1 episode
2010	Offspring	Guest role: Trish	TV series, 1 episode

=== Other appearances ===
Year	Title	Roles	Notes
1994	At Home	Herself - Guest	TV series, 1 episode
1993	A Current Affair	Herself	TV series, 1 episode
1992	In Sydney Today	Herself - Guest	TV series, 1 episode
1991	The World Tonight	Herself - "Beauty And The Beast" segment	TV series, 1 episode
1987	Have A Go	Herself - Guest Judge	TV series, 2 episodes
1978; 1980	The Mike Walsh Show	Guest - Herself	TV series, 1 episode
1980	The Mike Walsh Show	Guest - Herself	TV series, 1 episode
1974	The Ernie Sigley Show	Herself - Guest	TV series, 1 episode
