= Brendon Lunney =

Australian actor

Brendon Edward Lunney
- Born: 3 February 1949 (age 77); Eastwood, New South Wales, Australia
- Occupation: Actor

Brendon Lunney is an Australian actor and producer.

Lunney's featured screen roles include Michael in No Roses for Michael in 1970, Commissioner Edmund Fitzalan in Rush in 1974, Joey Emmett in Dead Men Running in 1971, Harry Byrne in Lucky Colour Blue in 1975. Ross in Do I Have to Kill My Child? in 1976 and Mark Adams in Carrots in 1979

Lunney was a regular presenter on Target and Switched On Set.

Lunney was a member of the Old Tote Theatre Company, appearing for them in As You Like It (1971), The Man of Mode(1971) and A Month in the Country (Parade Theatre, 1971).
