= The Box (Australian TV series) =

1975 Australian television serial

- Genre: Soap opera
- Created by: Ian Jones - Tom Hegarty
- Written by: Tom Hegarty; Don Battye; Jock Blair; Jonathan Dawson
- Country of origin: Australia
- Original language: English
- No. of series: 4
- No. of episodes: 603

Production
- Running time: 90 minute premiere, 474 x 30 minutes - 128 60 minutes
- Production company: Crawford Productions

Original release
- Network: ATV
- Release: 11 February 1974 – 11 October 1977

The Box is an Australian soap opera that ran on ATV-0 from 11 February 1974 until 11 October 1977 and on 0–10 Network affiliates around Australia.

The Box was produced by Crawford Productions which at the time was having great success producing police procedurals series in Australia; accordingly, The Box titles parodied police drama, featuring Ken James as Tony Wild leaping from his car and firing a gun. The Box was Crawfords' first soap opera, and was launched to complement the enormous success of another adult soap opera Number 96.

== Foundation ==
It originated as The Dream Makers, conceived by Ian Jones as a Crawford Productions series prior to the launch of Number 96. After Number 96 became a hit, The Dream Makers was revived as The Box to fill out an hour's time slot.

== Synopsis ==
The Box was a drama set in a fictional Melbourne television station, called UCV Channel 12, and explored the workings of the company and the professional and personal lives of its staff. It featured elements that satirised the Australian television industry.

Characters in the series were said to be modelled on Australian television figures of the day. Sir Henry Usher was based on media moguls Frank Packer and Reg Ansett, owner of Ansett Airlines and the 0/10 network. The tea lady Mrs Hopkins (Lois Ramsay) was based on Crawford Productions' own tea lady, Elizabeth Carter.

The Box featured many self-referential elements. Like Number 96 it was famous for its adult storylines, nude glimpses, and sexual content. Also like Number 96 it was spun off into a feature film adaptation, The Box.

== Storylines ==
The Box presented various fictional programs produced by UCV-12 that mirrored real-life Australian programs. Police procedural Manhunt, which was lumbered with dim, self-obsessed and accident-prone (but popular) lead actor Tony Wild (Ken James), parodied the police series produced by Crawfords at that time. Variety program Big Night Out was an In Melbourne Tonight style production. Medical drama Mercy Flight, discontinued following critics' condemnation, seemed connected to early British series The Flying Doctor (1959). Other programs produced by the station included children's show Holliday Farm and later, period drama Gully Rider. A flyer in the first production office for the channel, often seen in 1974-75, advertised an otherwise undiscussed program, Slattery's People.

The initial episodes of The Box emphasised sex, scandal, the political machinations of station personnel, and featured several nude scenes. The first episode showed a sexy young woman named Felicity (played by 20-year-old Helen Hemingway) seducing Big Night Out host Gary Burke (Peter Regan). Felicity then announced she was a 15-year-old schoolgirl, causing the station to try to avoid the scandal. Scheming bisexual television magazine journalist Vicki Stafford (Judy Nunn) exploited the situation and had Felicity pose for a nude centrefold with Tony Wild. Vicki also kissed Felicity, in Australian TV's first ever lesbian kiss. Felicity was soon revealed to be over 18, and schemed her way into the station to appear on Big Night Out before leaving for an international career as a porn star. She returned the following year to attempt to buy the channel: she had become a major shareholder and almost squeezed Sir Henry out of his position as chairman. Vicki soon switched to working for the station, producing and presenting daytime chat show Girl Talk, briefly hosting Big Night Out, working in publicity while appearing as the 'Wicked Witch' in the children's show Kiddie's Corner before hitting the big time with evening current affairs series Newsmakers.

The Box featured an openly gay television producer (and sometime children's television performer), the flamboyant Lee Whiteman (Paul Karo) who had an uneven relationship with garrulous tea lady Mrs. Hopkins (Lois Ramsey). Mrs. Hopkins' son Wayne (Bruce Kilpatrick) was released from prison - he had been falsely convicted - during the show's first year. When he fell in love with Lee, Mrs. Hopkins was forced to accept that her son was a homosexual. Dismissed from the channel, Wayne left Melbourne for Port Campbell where he was thought to have committed suicide; it was later revealed he had died saving another man from drowning. Mrs. Hopkins initially blamed Lee for her son's death but later came to accept they both loved Wayne.

Graeme Blundell was a prominent cast member in two tranches in 1974 and 1975 as floor manager, later director, Don Cook. Blundell was simultaneously unexpectedly famous as the star of Alvin Purple, advertised by March 1974 as the 'biggest grossing film in the history of the Australian film industry'. In his 2008 autobiography Blundell claims that Cook was 'steamily bedding as many of the amply endowed starlets as the Crawfords casting people could unwrap.' however Cook is only shown in two relationships in The Box, both of them very involved. A long storyline concerned Cook reluctantly engaged to Cathy Holliday (Kay McFeeter) while secretly living with Barbie Gray (Lynda Keane). Don was very different to Alvin: he was indecisive and cowardly, but also hot-headed. In episode 225 Don, Barbie - who he married - and their son 'Little Tony' moved to Jeparit when he found work as a variety show director on the (mythical) Channel 11.

Belinda Giblin and Monica Maughan played secretaries Kay and Jean who shared a flat. Kay had affairs with both station manager Max Knight (Barrie Barkla) and program director Paul Donovan (George Mallaby). Paul Donovan's wife Judy (Briony Behets) was also in an extramarital relationship with Allan Richards (Mark Albiston). Frustrated by Paul's lack of attention, Judy would later turn to shoplifting and also enter into an affair with used car salesman and gangster Johnny Marcelli (George Vidalis). She would later die in an explosion caused by Wayne Hopkins' former lover, Frank Roberts (John Krummel).

A feature film adaptation of The Box made at the end of the first year of production featured many of the regular series characters but had a stand-alone story. Belinda Giblin and George Mallaby, who had left the show, returned to play Kay Webster and Paul Donovan respectively (and for those characters to resume their sexual relationship) but Peter Regan, still a part of the series, opted out of the film to be replaced by Graham Kennedy, playing himself. The film emphasised comedy to a greater degree than the series version at that time.

The program's second year (1975) also increasingly emphasised comedy, much of it focused on Tony Wild. Enid Parker (Jill Forster) was chosen by Max Knight's wife Marian to replace Kay as his secretary. Enid was an adherent to health food and was opposed strenuously to alcohol and other unhealthy pursuits, but she was not a prude, and had a particularly lascivious attitude to Tony. Enid was perturbed when her glamorous sister, the scheming Emma (also played by Forster), showed up and impersonated her. Lee had a brief relationship with closeted newsreader John Barnett (Donald McDonald). Cheryl Rixon appeared on a recurring basis in 1975–1976 as television starlet Angela O'Malley, and appeared nude in the series several times.

For the 1976 season, Jock Blair returned as the program's producer and announced his plans to refocus the series to emphasise adult drama as it had done in its first year.

== Production ==
The Crawford Productions series was created and written by Ian Jones and Tom Hegarty and commenced at the studios of Melbourne's ATV-0 in October 1973. The premiere 90-minute episode screened on ATV-0 on 11 February 1974 at 9.00pm.

The program was initially shot in black and white, before switching to colour production from episode 221, which aired in late 1974.

The Box was proposed with the title The Dream Makers. Crawfords' head executive Hector Crawford believed network owner Reg Ansett would reject the series due to its adult themes and risqué content. The series was therefore offered to the Seven Network which turned it down. The series was put on hold then re-pitched to the 0-10 Network under new title The Box, and purchased in a deal by Ansett on 14 July 1973.

The Box proved to be a huge hit, ranking as Australia's second most popular show in 1974. (Number 96 was Australia's highest rating television production that year.)

A feature film adaptation of the series was produced in January 1975 and released later that year. It placed a greater emphasis on comedy than the series at that time, and featured several scenes featuring full frontal nudity. The film's sets were later moved to the television studios to be used in the series. In the show's storyline an office fire in October 1975 explained the change in appearance.

Production of the series was in half-hour episodes for the first two years. In some regions two episodes were aired consecutively in one-hour blocks. Other regions broadcast the serial as five half-hour instalments each week, stripped across each weekday evening. Starting with the 1976 season episodes were compiled in one-hour instalments.

In Melbourne episodes screened as two, one-hour episodes each week throughout 1976.

Production on the series ended 1 April 1977 due to declining ratings. The closing episodes screened through 1977 in a late-night timeslot. The final episode, 603, was broadcast in Melbourne on 11 October 1977.

== Regular cast 1974-1975 ==
Actor	Role
George Mallaby	Paul Donovan
Barrie Barkla	Max Knight
Ken James	Tony Wild
Fred Betts	Sir Henry Usher
Peter Regan	Gary Burke
Belinda Giblin	Kay Webster/Kay Webster-Brookes
Paul Karo	Lee Whiteman
Judy Nunn	Vicki Stafford
Briony Behets	Judy Donovan
Fred 'Cul' Cullen	Eddie Holliday
Helen Hemingway	Felicity Baker
Kay McFeeter	Cathy Holliday
Graeme Blundell	Don Cook
Monica Maughan	Jean Ford
Lois Ramsay	Mrs. Hopkins
Ken Snodgrass	Jack O'Brien
Luigi Villani	Mick Maloney
Lynda Keane	Barbie Gray/Barbie Cook
Vanessa Leigh	Fanny Adams
Carol Passmore	Chris Burke
Margaret Cruickshank	Marion Knight
Shane Porteous	David Warner
Syd Heylen	Vern Walters
Owen Weingott	Phillip Bailey-Smith
Bruce Kilpatrick	Wayne Hopkins
Patricia Stephenson	Susie King
Delvene Delaney	Penny O'Brien
David Downer	Brad Miller
John Krummel	Frank Roberts
John Waters	Michael Brookes

=== Guest cast ===
Colleen Hewett appeared as herself resident singer on 'Big Night Out' singing Roberta Flack song "The First Time Ever I Saw Your Face" in the TV pilot movie episode. Hewett was also featured in episode 351 in 1975, again as herself singing on Big Night Out.

Deborra-Lee Furness appeared as a recurring one-line extra ('Debbie') in episodes produced in late 1974 and can be seen in the background of many scenes at this time.

=== Cast notes ===
Judy Nunn, Barrie Barkla, Ken James, Ken Snodgrass and Lois Ramsay appeared throughout the series' entire run. Barrie Barkla worked at a TV station (CTC-7 in Canberra) before moving to Melbourne to play his role as the station manager in The Box. After The Box finished Barkla moved to Perth where he worked as a presenter for the Nine Network station STW-9.

Peter Regan, who played the part of TV host Gary Burke, went on to become host of ABC's Quest variety series in 1976–78.

== Scriptwriters ==
Key writers for the early episodes included Tom Hegarty (born c. 1934-1935 - 22 September 2023), Don Battye and Jonathan Dawson.

== Awards ==
George Mallaby won the Best Australian Actor-National Logie Award in 1975 for his portrayal of television executive Paul Donovan in The Box.

Paul Karo won the Best Australian Actor-National Logie Award in 1976 for his portrayal of gay producer Lee Whiteman.

== Feature film ==
A 1975 feature film, The Box, was produced based on the series, and featuring much of the same cast. The film also features Graham Kennedy playing himself, and Cornelia Frances in the key role of Dr. S. M. Winter, an efficiency expert brought in to improve operations at UCV-12.

A DVD release of the feature film was announced in 2023 and was made available on 1 February 2024.

== DVD releases ==
In late 2014 Volume 1 of The Box, featuring a selection of episodes from the first year, was released by Crawford Productions. In 2015 Volume 2, which features another selection of episodes from the first year of the series, was released. The releases are described as containing a "selection" of episodes due to a small number of episodes that are excluded as the original tapes were missing or damaged. Each release contains the equivalent of 50 thirty-minute episodes (the first episode is feature length). From the first DVD of 50 episodes, six are excluded as they were missing or damaged. One episode is missed in volumes 2's run of 50 episodes.

The run of episodes continues in Volume 3 which was released in September 2015. Volume 3 contains 50 episodes and there are no missing episodes in this run. Volume 4 was released in January 2017, also with no missing episodes.

After more than a six year hiatus, Crawfords released Volume 5 at the end of September 2023. Volume 6 of the series was released through Crawfords in October 2023 and Volume 7 was released in December 2023. October 11, 2024 sees the final Volume 14 of The Box TV series released.

The Box movie was released in February 2024.

Title	Format	Ep #	Discs	Region 4 (Australia)	Special features	Distributors	Notes
The Box (Volume 01)	DVD	44	07	2014	None	Crawford Productions	Six Episodes are Missing.
The Box (Volume 02)	DVD	55-105	07	2015	None	Crawford Productions	Episode 57 (Missing) original tape damaged.
The Box (Volume 03)	DVD	106-155	07	September 2015	None	Crawford Productions	None
The Box (Volume 04)	DVD	156-205	07	16 January 2017	None	Crawford Productions	None
The Box (Volume 05)	DVD	206-255	07	29 September 2023	None	Crawford Productions	None
The Box (Volume 06)	DVD	256-305	07	31 October 2023	None	Crawford Productions	None
The Box (Volume 07)	DVD	306-355	07	29 November 2023	None	Crawford Productions	None
The Box (Volume 08)	DVD	356-405	07	1 March 2024	None	Crawford Productions	None
The Box (Volume 09)	DVD	406-455	07	3 April 2024	None	Crawford Productions	None
The Box (Volume 10)	DVD	456-491	07	30 May 2024	None	Crawford Productions	None
The Box (Volume 11)	DVD	492-519	07	24 June 2024	None	Crawford Productions	None
The Box (Volume 12)	DVD	520-547	07	29 July 2024	None	Crawford Productions	None
The Box (Volume 13)	DVD	548-575	07	26 August 2024	None	Crawford Productions	None
The Box (Volume 14)	DVD	576-603	07	11 October 2024	Last episode has audio commentary from TV historian Andrew Mercado. Plus an all new exclusive 48 minute retrospective documentary on The Box.	Crawford Productions	None

== See also ==
- List of Australian television series
- Chances (TV series)
