= Greg Anderson (Australian musician) =

Australian musician

Greg Anderson is an Australian musician and horserider. His single "No Roses For Michael" from the TV film of the same name reached #21 on the Australian charts in 1970.

Anderson's career began in the sixties and he released two early singles through Kommotion. In 1970 he recorded the theme song for a TV movie titled No Roses For Michael and it was released as a single by Festival and charted in October 1970. Through Festival he went on to release an album and four more singles. Anderson started performing a long running show as the Electric Horseman (the name was taken from the Robert Redford film) with his horse Butch Cassidy.

Anderson married actress Lynda Keane from Bellbird and joined the cast of that show for a period of six weeks. They had three children together.

== Discography ==
=== Albums ===
- Greg Anderson (Festival, 1970)

=== Singles ===
- "I Feel Good" / "When It's All Over" (Kommotion, 1966)
- "I've Been Unfaithful" / "Mickey's Monkey" (Kommotion, 1966)
- "No Roses For Michael" / "Ned Kelly" (Festival, 1970) Aus #21
- "Just Come Running To Me" / "Live For Life" (Festival, 1971)
- "Shame" / "It's Wrong" (Festival, 1971)
- "Someone Somewhere" / "It's Over" (Festival, 1972)
- "Thank Your Lucky Star" / "It's Over" (Festival, 1972)
