= 1974–75 Australian Film Institute Awards =

Australian film awards ceremony in 1975

1974−75 Australian Film Awards
- Date: 23 March 1975
- Site: Sydney Opera House; Sydney, New South Wales
- Hosted by: Glenda Jackson

Highlights
- Best Film: Sunday Too Far Away
- Most awards: Billy and Percy and Sunday Too Far Away (3)

The 17th Australian Film Awards ceremony, presented by the Australian Film Institute (AFI) honoured the best Australian films of 1974 and 1975 and took place on 23 March 1975, at the Sydney Opera House, in Sydney, New South Wales. Actress Glenda Jackson hosted the ceremony.

== Winners ==
In the competition the Australian Film Institute (AFI) presented awards across nine categories. The winners of the Golden Reel prize included feature film Sunday Too Far Away (which is considered the winner of the Best Film category), tele-movie Billy and Percy, and documentary Mr. Symbol Man; feature films Petersen and The True Story of Eskimo Nell and documentaries A Steam Train Passes and Stirring won the Silver prize; and the film Between Wars won the Bronze prize. Awards were also handed out in feature film categories for Best Actor, which went to Jack Thompson for Sunday Too Far Away and Petersen and Martin Vaughan for Billy and Percy; Julie Dawson for Best Actress, for Who Killed Jenny Langby?; Barry Humphries and Reg Lye for Best Supporting Actor, for The Great Macarthy and Sunday Too Far Away respectively; and John Power for Best Direction, for Billy and Percy.
Winners of the gold prize.
Winners of the silver prize.
Winners of the bronze prize.

Category	Winners
Golden Reel Prize for Best Film	* Sunday Too Far Away
Golden Reel Prize for Best Documentary	* Mr. Symbol Man
Golden Reel Prize	* Billy and Percy
Silver Prize for Best Film	* Petersen
Silver Prize for Best Documentary	* A Steam Train Passes
Silver Prize for Best Documentary	* Stirring
Silver Medallion for Photography	* Vincent Monton – The True Story of Eskimo Nell
Bronze Prize for Best Film	* Between Wars
Best Direction	* John Power – Billy and Percy
Best Actor	* Jack Thompson – Sunday Too Far Away and Petersen
Best Actor	* Martin Vaughan – Billy and Percy
Best Actress	* Sunday Too Far Away
Best Supporting Actor (Honourable mentions)	* Barry Humphries – The Great McCarthy
Best Supporting Actor (Honourable mentions)	* Reg Lye – Sunday Too Far Away
Best Screenplay	* David Williamson – Petersen
Best Original Music Score	* Bruce Smeaton – The Cars That Ate Paris and The Great McCarthy
Alan Stout Award for Best Short Film	* John Papadopoulos – Matchless
Alan Stout Award for Best Short Film	* Ian Macrae – Love is Hate
Alan Stout Award for Best Short Film	* Chris Noonan – Bulls
Media Department Award for a film depicting an aspect of Australian life and endeavor	* Sunday Too Far Away
