= Terence Donovan (actor) =

Australian actor (1935–2026)

- Donovan in the TV series Cop Shop
- Born: Terence Patrick Donovan; 28 October 1935; London, England
- Died: 18 July 2026 (aged 90); Melbourne, Victoria, Australia
- Other names: Terence J. Donovan; Terry Donovan
- Occupation: Actor
- Years active: 1960–2022
- Known for: Breaker Morant: The Man from Snowy River; Division 4; Cop Shop; Neighbours; Home and Away
- Spouses: Sue McIntosh (m. 1965; div. 1972); Marlene Saunders (m. 1981)
- Children: 2, including Jason Donovan
- Relatives: Jemma Donovan (granddaughter)

Terence Patrick Donovan (28 October 1935 – 18 July 2026) was an Australian actor of stage, television and film. Donovan is perhaps known to audiences for his roles in the Australian police dramas Division 4 and Cop Shop, as well as his roles in the soap operas Home and Away as Al Simpson and Neighbours as patriarch Doug Willis. His film roles include Money Movers, Breaker Morant and The Man from Snowy River. He had guest roles in numerous serials including Prisoner, Sons and Daughters, A Country Practice and E Street. He was the father of actor and singer Jason Donovan.

== Early life ==
Terence Patrick Donovan was born in London, England, on 28 October 1935. He moved to Australia with his parents when he was 14, joining his older brother George. Before his acting career took off, Donovan worked as a truck driver and a house painter.

== Career ==
Donovan started his career in theatre with his first professional acting job in the 1960 Garnet H. Carroll production of West Side Story. After the production closed, Donovan stayed on with the Carroll organisation and appeared in the musicals The Most Happy Fella and The Sound of Music. He later joined the Emerald Hill Theatre Company after meeting its founder, Wal Cherry.

Donovan had minor roles in episodes of the courtroom drama series Consider Your Verdict, several ABC drama plays and the children's series The Magic Boomerang.

After becoming frustrated by the lack of acting opportunities in Australia, Donovan returned to London in 1963 where he secured work with Rediffusion and Granada. He appeared in such shows as The Champions, Man in a Suitcase, Danger Man, The Hidden Truth and The Prisoner. He had a season with the Oxford Playhouse and went on to appear in No Hiding Place and the feature films Oliver! and The Strange Affair. When his wife became pregnant, she returned to Melbourne as she wanted their child to be born there. Donovan took a job as an entertainment officer on a ship in order to join her. After returning to Australia, Donovan appeared in a production of Oh, What a Lovely War! before he was offered a role in Thomas Keneally's play Halloran's Little Boat at the St Martin's Theatre. He also starred in Period of Adjustment at the same theatre.

He went on to guest in Crawford Productions shows Homicide and Hunter in 1968, before he was cast in the role of Detective Mick Peters in Division 4. He starred in Division 4 from 1969 to 1975. In 1976, he appeared in the miniseries adaptation of the novel Power Without Glory by Frank Hardy. He played the title role of Harry "Breaker" Morant in the first public performance of Kenneth G. Ross's Australian play Breaker Morant: A Play in Two Acts, presented by the Melbourne Theatre Company at the Athenaeum Theatre on 2 February 1978. Donovan also appeared in the 1980 film Breaker Morant, but in the role of Captain Hunt, rather than as the title character.

Donovan played the lead in the 1978 crime drama film Money Movers, which received critical acclaim, but was a failure at the box office. From 1979 to 1981, he starred as Detective Senior Sergeant Vic Cameron in Cop Shop. Donovan chose to leave the role before his contract expired and without any work lined up. However, he was offered a role in the film The Man from Snowy River as Henry Craig shortly after. He also starred as lawyer Billy Flynn in the Sydney Theatre Company's production of Chicago.

After his 11 month run concluded, Donovan took some time out to rest, but filled in for Jimmy Hannan, who had broken his foot, on an episode of The Saturday Show. Donovan had to learn four songs from the musical The Music Man in 24 hours ahead of his appearance.

Donovan the lead role of Lt. Al Wheeler in the stage musical The Stripper written by Richard Hartley and Richard O'Brien. The musical was staged in conjunction with the Sydney Theatre Company in August 1982. Between 1981 and 1984, he had minor roles in Australian television programs. In 1985, he had roles in Prisoner and Sons and Daughters. From 1986 to 1990, he had more minor television roles including the 1989 pilot episode of E Street as Ken Swanson, which was followed by guest roles in A Country Practice, The Flying Doctors and G. P.

In 1990, he had a six-week guest role in Home and Away as the second actor, after George Leppard, to play Al Simpson, the father of original character Bobby Simpson. He then starred in a production of Barnum in Perth, for which he learned how to juggle, before playing The King of Troy in rock musical Paris. He joined the main cast of Neighbours as Doug Willis in 1990. He and his on-screen family were written out of Neighbours in 1994. The following year, Donovan played Captain Hook in a UK touring production of Peter Pan, alongside Nicola Stapleton and Laurence Mark Wythe. Donovan reprised his role as Doug for Neighbours' 20th-anniversary special in July 2005.

In 2003, he appeared in the drama series MDA in the role of Eric Savage, father of Richard Savage (played by his son Jason Donovan). In 2007, Donovan performed in the Magnormos production of Mary Bryant as Boswell. Donovan reprised his Neighbours role in 2014.

He also appeared in the Neighbours 30th: The Stars Reunite documentary to celebrate the show's 30th anniversary, which aired in March 2015. He reprised the role of Doug Willis in episodes of the serial in 2016, culminating in the character's death. Donovan later expressed his unhappiness with Doug's exit, saying that it was not the way he wanted to leave. He made a cameo appearance in the show's then-finale episode in July 2022, alongside his son Jason Donovan.

== Personal life and death ==
Donovan was married to the actress and television presenter Sue McIntosh In Ashford Kent from 1965 until 1972. They had a son, the actor and musician Jason Donovan, who Donovan raised as a single parent until he married his second wife, Marlene Saunders, in November 1981. Donovan and Saunders subsequently had a son born in October 1982. Donovan encouraged Jason to reject the role of Scott Robinson in Neighbours in order to finish his final year of school and get his HSC. The role was initially taken by Darius Perkins but Jason joined the serial in 1986.

Donovan died in Melbourne on 18 July 2026 at the age of 90.

== Filmography ==
=== Film ===
Year	Title	Role	Notes
1968	Oliver!	Policeman (Consider Yourself)	
1977	The Getting of Wisdom	Tom McNamara	
1978	Money Movers	Eric Jackson	
1980	Breaker Morant	Captain Simon Hunt	
1981	Smash Palace	Traffic Officer	
1981	Strange Behavior	Mr. Brown	
1982	Night of Shadows	Harry Vinson / Blackie Webb	Short film
1982	The Man from Snowy River	Henry Craig	
1983	The Winds of Jarrah	Timber Marlow	
1985	Fortress	Detective Sgt Mitchell	
1986	Death of a Soldier	John Curtin	
1987	Running from the Guns	Bangles	
1990	Jigsaw	Jack McCluskey	
2003	Horseplay	Mr. Perlman	
2005	Puppy	Dr. Holden	
TBA	We All Have Our Demons	Abbie's Dad	Short film

=== Television ===
Year	Title	Role	Notes
1961–1963	Consider Your Verdict	Keith Upton	Recurring
1964	Nude with Violin	Clinton Preminger	TV film
1964	The Hidden Truth	TV reporter	Episode: "One for the Road"
1964	It's a Woman's World	Jim	Episode: "Julie"
1964	The Indian Tales of Rudyard Kipling	Private Jenkins	Episode: "His Private Honour"
1965	Thursday Theatre	1st newspaper boy	Episode: "Johnson over Jordan"
1965	Songs of the American Civil War		TV film
1965	Songs of the Wild West		TV film
1965	Chicago in the Roaring 20s		TV film
1965	Object Z	Captain Wade	Recurring
1965	Armchair Theatre	Carrier	Episode: "The Titled Screen"
1965–1966	The Magic Boomerang		
1966	Bat Out of Hell	Sloane	Miniseries
1967	Man in a Suitcase	Brent	Episode: "Sweet Sue"
1967	The Prisoner	Sailor	Episode: "Checkmate"
1968	The Champions	Radio Operator	Episode: "Twelve Hours"
1968–1969	Hunter	Wade / Biggs / Peter Grant	
1968–1977	Homicide	Gerald Stone / Greg Adams / Peter Mahoney	
1969–1975	Division 4	Senior Detective Mick Peters	Main cast
1974	This Love Affair	Charlie	Anthology series
1974	Rush	Doctor Kirby	
1975	The Last of the Australians	Mr. Walker	
1976	Tandarra	Sean Daly	
1976	Solo One	Bill Morgan	
1976	Power Without Glory	Frank Lammence	Miniseries
1977	The Outsiders	Stan Fraser	
1977	Bellbird	Neil Farrer	
1977	Going Home	Miles Newton	TV film
1977	Hotel Story	Hotel manager	Main cast
1979–1981	Cop Shop	Detective Sgt. Vic Cameron	Main cast
1983	A Country Practice	Harry Taylor	Episodes: "Truth and Consequences Parts 1 & 2"
1985	A Country Practice	T. J. Riley	Episodes: "Seasons Come and Seasons Go Parts 1 & 2"
1985	Winners	Trigg	Anthology series
1985	Prisoner	Bob Taylor	Recurring role
1985–1986	Sons and Daughters	Tom Chaplin	
1986	A Single Life	Chris	TV film
1987	Emma's War	Father Grange	TV film
1987	Room to Move	Peter Trigg	TV film
1988	Australians		Episode: "Errol Flynn"
1988	Joe Wilson	Walis	Miniseries
1989	E Street	Ken Swanson	Episode: "Tuesday"
1989	Mission Impossible	Senator Tom Oxenford	Episode: "The Fixer"
1989	G.P.	Darcy Watts	Episode: "Second Chance"
1989	The Flying Doctors	Jim Cardaci	Episode: "The Chips Are Down"
1989	A Country Practice	Joe Baxter	Episodes: "Fly Away Home Parts 1 & 2"
1990	Home and Away	Al Simpson	Guest
1990	Flair	Sergeant Doogan	Miniseries
1990–1994; 2005; 2014–2016; 2022	Neighbours	Doug Willis	Main cast
1999	Heartbreak High	Warwick	Guest
1999	Blue Heelers	Ian Waldron	Guest
2002–2003	Signs of Life	Travis	
2003	MDA	Eric Savage	Episodes: "A Closer Walk", "A Reasonable Passion"
2013	House Husbands	Doug	Guest
2015	Neighbours 30th: The Stars Reunite	Himself	TV special
2015	Neighbours: Hey Piper	Doug Willis	Web series

== Theatre ==
Year	Title	Role	Theatre/company	Ref.
1960	West Side Story		Princess Theatre, Melbourne with Garnet H. Carroll	
1963	The Bishop's Candlestick / The Bones of My Toe / The Oak Settle		Russell Street Theatre with Union Theatre Repertory Company (UTRC)	
1963	The Last of the Rainbow		Emerald Hill Theatre with Australian Elizabethan Theatre Trust (AETT)	
1964	Hamlet	Gravedigger	University of Melbourne, Russell Street Theatre with UTRC	
	The Most Happy Fella			
	The Sound of Music			
1968	Halloran's Little Boat	Terry Byrne	Playhouse, Perth, St Martin's Theatre, Melbourne	
1968	Period of Adjustment		St Martins Theatre, Melbourne	
1968	Oh, What a Lovely War!		St Martins Theatre, Melbourne	
1977	The Fall Guy	Gordon	Russell Street Theatre with Melbourne Theatre Company (MTC)	
1977; 1979	The Club	Laurie	Russell Street Theatre with MTC & Newcastle Civic Theatre with Hunter Valley Theatre Company	
1978	Breaker Morant: A Play in Two Acts	Harry "Breaker" Morant	Melbourne Athenaeum with MTC	
1978	The Next Greatest Pleasure	Dostoevsky / Mick O'Brien	Playbox Theatre, Melbourne with Hoopla Theatre Foundation	
1979	Miss Julie	Jean	Playbox Theatre, Melbourne with Hoopla Theatre Foundation	
1981	Chicago	Billy Flynn	Australian tour with Sydney Theatre Company (STC)	
1982	The Stripper	Lt. Al Wheeler	Kinselas, Sydney with STC	
1983	The Portage to San Cristobal of A.H.	Gideon Benasseral	Sydney Opera House with STC	
1983	The Marginal Farm	Marshal	Russell St Theatre, Melbourne with MTC	
1984	Middle-Age Spread	Colin	Playhouse, Adelaide with The Stage Company	
1986	Company	Larry	Sydney Opera House with STC	
1986	Hurlyburly	Phil	Russell Street Theatre with MTC	
1986	King of Country		Wharf Theatre, Sydney with STC	
1988	Faces in the Street		Everest Theatre, Sydney	
1988	Educating Rita	Dr. Frank Bryant	Phillip St Theatre, Sydney	
1989	Coralie Lansdowne Says No	Peter York	Studio Theatre, Melbourne, Monash University, Melbourne, West Gippsland Arts Centre with Playbox Theatre Company	
1990	Barnum	P. T. Barnum	His Majesty's Theatre, Perth with Western Australian Theatre Company	
1990	Paris: A Love Story	Priam, the King of Troy		
1995	Peter Pan	Captain Hook	UK tour	
1998	Follies	Benjamin Stone	Sydney Opera House	
1999	Born Yesterday	Senator Norval Hodges	Playhouse, Melbourne with MTC	
1999	Certified Male		Melbourne Athenaeum	
2002	Footloose	Principal Clark	Capitol Theatre, Sydney with The Gordon Frost Organisation	
2004	Carousel	Narrator	State Theatre, Melbourne with Victorian Arts Centre	
2004	Annie Get Your Gun	Buffalo Bill	State Theatre, Melbourne with The Production Company	
2005	Sunset Boulevard	Cecil B. DeMille	State Theatre, Melbourne with The Production Company	
2007	Mary Bryant	Boswell	Theatre Works, Melbourne with Magnormos	
2008–2009	Travelling North	Frank	Australian tour with HIT Productions	
