= Jane Oehr =

Jane Oehr is an Australian film and television director and writer. She won the Silver Prize for Best Documentary Award at the 17th Australian Film Awards Australian Film Institute Awards with Stirring and was nominated for the 1984 Australian Film Institute Awards for Best Screenplay in a Non-Feature Film.

As a university student Oehr started acting, starring in ABC TV's Call Me a Liar in 1961, appearing in White Carnation in 1963 and performing in Guarding the Change on West End in 1965.

While in London working in theatre and BBC television she married Ian Stocks. Together they made a documentary film (working title The Only Place on Earth) in Bali on Australian artist Donald Friend. The both produced, Oehr directed and Stocks operated the camera. It was released, titled Tamu (subtitled The Guest), in 1972. The followed it up with Niugini - Culture Shock which debuted at the Opera House in 1974. Reluctant Flame, a companion piece, was created at the same time.

Stirring, a documentary looking at corporal punishment, and Seeing Red and Feeling Blue about menstruation followed.

1980 saw the release of a short drama film Roma based on a play of the same name.

Working with Health Media Productions Oehr directed Go Health. Moving into fiction they created Heads 'N Tails which then led to On the Loose which she directed and co wrote.

== Filmography ==
- Black Man in the Cinema (1968)
- Four Women Filmmakers (1969)
- Play School (1970) - writer, director, multiple episodes
- Moonrock (1970)
- Film Night (1971) - director, multiple episodes
- Tamu (1972) - director, producer
- Niugini - Culture Shock (1974) - director, producer
- Reluctant Flame (1974) - director
- Stirring (1975) - writer, director
- Seeing Red and Feeling Blue (1976) - writer, director
- Roma (1980) - writer, director
- Mirror, Mirror (1981)
- Go Health (1981) - director
- Heads 'N Tails (1983) - writer, director
- On the Loose (1984) - writer, director
- Relative Merits (1987) - writer
- More Winners (1990) - writer, director, one episode
- Mum at 88 (2002) - writer, director
- Tea With Madame Clos (2010) - writer, director
