= The Haunted School (TV series) =

Australian television series

- Created by: Carol Drinkwater
- Based on: The Haunted School
- Screenplay by: Helen Creswell
- Directed by: Frank Arnold
- Starring: Carol Drinkwater; James Laurie; Lynne Porteous; Emil Minty; Beth Buchanan
- Country of origin: Australia
- Original language: English
- No. of seasons: 1
- No. of episodes: 8

Production
- Producer: Ray Alchin
- Cinematography: Peter Hendry; Roger Lanser
- Editor: Lynn Solly
- Running time: 30 minutes

Original release
- Network: ABC
- Release: October 2, 1986

The Haunted School is an Australian television series that aired on ABC in 1986.

== Synopsis ==
A young English teacher opens a school in a haunted hotel.

== Cast ==
- Carol Drinkwater as Fanny Crowe
- James Laurie as Joseph McCormack
- Michael Beecher as Henry Blackburn
- Vic Hawkins as Henry Blackburn (replaced Beecher after an on-set injury)
- Emil Minty as Patrick McCormick
- Grant Navin as Richard Blackburn
- Beth Buchanan as Vanessa
- Leigh Nicholls as Clarissa
- Mouche Phillips as Magpie
- Lynne Porteous as Lil Boyd
- Mervyn Drake as Charlie Boyd
- Harry Lawrence as Jermiah
- Duncan Wass as Reverend Dalton
- Jennifer West as Mrs. Tippery

== Production ==
Created by and starring Carol Drinkwater the series was based on her novel by the same name. Over objections from the Australian Writers' Guild the producers used an English writer, Helen Cresswell, for the script. It was shot in near Belrose in a gold-mining village created for the production. Actor Michael Beecher was injured during the second week of production and was replaced by Vic Hawkins who five weeks later was also injured and was replaced by the returning Beecher.
