= Harold Hopkins (actor) =

Australian actor (1944–2011)

- Born: Harold Douglas Hopkins; 6 March 1944; Toowoomba, Queensland, Australia
- Died: 11 December 2011 (aged 67); Wahroonga, New South Wales, Australia
- Occupation: Actor
- Years active: 1967–2010

Harold Douglas Hopkins (6 March 1944 – 11 December 2011) was an Australian film and television actor.

== Early life ==
Hopkins was born on 6 March 1944, in Toowoomba, Queensland. He was one of seven children (including Naomi, Michael, Gregory, Margaret, Suzanne and twin brother John) born to Francis Hopkins and Olive (nee Ascroft).

He attended The Southport School and Toowoomba Grammar School as a day boy in 1958 and 1959. During the 1960s, he worked as an apprentice carpenter, and was exposed to asbestos fibres without protective masks or clothing.

After his apprenticeship, Hopkins and his twin brother John enrolled at the National Institute of Dramatic Art (NIDA) in Sydney, with Harold graduating in 1967.

== Career ==
=== Theatre ===
After numerous theatre performances with NIDA in the late 1960s, Hopkins originated the role of Danny Rowe, captain of the Collingwood Football Club in a 1977 stage production of David Williamson's satirical play The Club.

Hopkins' appeared on stage with the Sydney Theatre Company and Melbourne Theatre Company playing Barney in Ray Lawler's The Doll Trilogy at the Sydney Opera House, Melbourne Athenaeum and again three years later in New York.

=== Television ===
Hopkins' on-screen career began in the late 1960s with a recurring guest role on the short-lived daytime soap opera Motel, alongside Jack Thompson. He also had a major co-starring role opposite Jeanie Drynan in the 1969 ABC drama miniseries Pastures of the Blue Crane, an adaptation of the 1965 children's novel by Hesba Brinsmead.

Other early television credits included Skippy the Bush Kangaroo, Riptide, Delta and Barrier Reef. He also had a recurring role in the 1971 comedy drama series The Godfathers and its spin-off The People Next Door. Hopkins won a Penguin Award in 1974 for his portrayal of private secretary Percy Deane in John Power's docudrama Billy and Percy.

Hopkins went on to appear in numerous other series including Certain Women, Silent Number, Matlock Police, Homicide, Division 4, Rush and The Lost Islands. He then landed a lead role in the 1979 series Twenty Good Years.

Hopkins also appeared in several miniseries including Sara Dane (1982), The Last Bastion (1984), The Dirtwater Dynasty (1988), True Believers (1988), Winners, Shadows of the Heart (1990) and Brides of Christ (1991).

Later television series in which Hopkins had roles, included State Coroner, Blue Heelers, White Collar Blue, Wildside, All Saints, The Secret Life of Us, Grass Roots and The Strip. He also played Melbourne arms dealer George Joseph in Underbelly: A Tale of Two Cities, the second season of underworld series Underbelly.

=== Film ===
Hopkins first foray into film began with a supporting role in Age of Consent (1969), with James Mason and Helen Mirren. He appeared in 16 films over the course of his career, including classic Australian films Don's Party (1976) in which he played the role of Cooley, and The Picture Show Man (1977).

Hopkins reprised his role as Danny in The Club (from his 1977 stage performance) once more in Bruce Beresford's 1980 film adaptation. His performance saw him nominated for a 1981 Australian Film Institute Award for Best Supporting Actor. He lost out to Bill Hunter for Peter Weir's war drama Gallipoli, in which Hopkins also starred as obnoxious farmhand Les McCann, opposite Mel Gibson and Mark Lee.

Further film credits included Monkey Grip (1982), Fantasy Man (1984), Children of the Revolution (1996) and 1987 coming of age drama The Year My Voice Broke, with Noah Taylor and Ben Mendelsohn. Several TV films followed, including Big Ideas (1993) and Never Tell Me Never (1998). In 2001, he starred as a dying man in AFI-nominated, TV short Saturn’s Return, opposite Joel Edgerton, who played his son.

Hopkins' final film was 2010 horror thriller The Clinic. His last audition was for the role of Jay Gatbsy’s father, Henry C. Gatz in Baz Luhrmann's The Great Gatsby, although he knew he would not live to play the role, as he had been diagnosed with cancer mere days earlier.

== Awards ==
| Year | Work | Award | Category | Result | Ref. |
|---|---|---|---|---|---|
| 1974 | Billy and Percy | Penguin Award | | Won | |
| 1981 | The Club | Australian Film Institute Awards | Best Supporting Actor | Nominated | |

== Personal life ==
Harold Hopkins married twice. His second marriage was to Sue Collie, an actress he met in Melbourne in 1977, while starring in the original stage production of David Williamson's The Club with Melbourne Theatre Company.

In the 1970s, Hopkins bought land at Webbs Creek, on the Hawkesbury River. Between stage and film roles, Hopkins worked as a Hawkesbury River ferryman.

== Death ==
In 2011, Hopkins was diagnosed with mesothelioma, believed to be due to his asbestos exposure in the 1960s. He died in Neringah Private Hospital, a Sydney hospice in Wahroonga on 11 December 2011, at the age of 67. He was survived by his six siblings, including twin brother John.

== Filmography ==
=== Film ===
| Year | Title | Role | Notes | Ref. |
|---|---|---|---|---|
| 1969 | You Can't See 'round Corners | Soldier at dance (uncredited) | | |
| 1969 | Age of Consent | Ted Farrell | | |
| 1970 | Adam's Woman | Cosh | | |
| 1971 | Demonstrator | Malcolm | | |
| 1976 | Don’s Party | Grainger Cooley (Susan's boyfriend) | | |
| 1977 | The Picture Show Man | Larry Pym | | |
| 1980 | The Club | Danny Rowe | | |
| 1981 | Gallipoli | Les McCann | | |
| 1982 | Monkey Grip | Willie | | |
| 1982 | Ginger Meggs | Mr. Fox | | |
| 1983 | Buddies | Johnny | | |
| 1983 | The Winds of Jarrah | Jack Farrell | | |
| 1984 | Stanley: Every Home Should Have One | Harry | | |
| 1984 | Fantasy Man | Nick Bailey | | |
| 1987 | The Year My Voice Broke | Tom Alcock | | |
| 1992 | Resistance | Peach | | |
| 1993 | No Worries | John Burke | | |
| 1993 | Kin chan no Cinema Jack | | | |
| 1996 | Children of the Revolution | Police Commissioner | | |
| 1997 | Blackrock | Principal | | |
| 1997 | Joey | Kanga Catcher | | |
| 1998 | Bloodlock | Peter | Short film | |
| 2000 | Our Lips Are Sealed | Shelby Shaw | | |
| 2005 | The Assistant | Enzo | Short film | |
| 2010 | The Clinic | Grave Digger | Final film role | |

=== Television ===
| Year | Title | Role | Notes | Ref. |
|---|---|---|---|---|
| 1968 | Motel | Bruce Jackson | 2 episodes | |
| 1969 | Skippy the Bush Kangaroo | Tim Grant | 2 episodes | |
| 1969 | Riptide | Harry | 1 episode | |
| 1969 | Pastures of the Blue Crane | Perry, the taxi driver | Miniseries, 5 episodes | |
| 1969 | Delta | Alan Tibbett | 1 episode | |
| 1969 | Australian Plays | Ben Torrents | Episode: "The Torrents" | |
| 1969–1973 | Division 4 | Eric Smith / Max Williams / Dave Clarke / Ted Kavanagh | 4 episodes | |
| 1970–1971 | Barrier Reef | Steve Gabo | 39 episodes | |
| 1971–1972 | The Godfathers | David Milson | 46 episodes | |
| 1971–1974 | Matlock Police | Doug Campbell / George Kelly / Luke Reid / Rocky / Tony Grey / Chip Richardson | 6 episodes | |
| 1973 | Boney | Jack Wilton | 1 episode | |
| 1973 | The People Next Door | Dave Milson | 20 episodes | |
| 1974 | Silent Number | Brendon | 1 episode | |
| 1974 | Billy and Percy | Percy Deane | TV movie | |
| 1974–1975 | Certain Women | | 9 episodes | |
| 1967–1975 | Homicide | Geoff Brady / Constable Alec Henderson / Gary Thompson | 3 episodes | |
| 1975 | Ben Hall | Johnny Vane | Miniseries, 4 episodes | |
| 1976 | The Lost Islands | Thomas Quick | 1 episode | |
| 1976 | Rush | Hardy Evans | 1 episode | |
| 1978 | The Young Doctors | Orderly Terry Cooper | 3 episodes | |
| 1978 | Case for the Defence | Theo Lambrakis | 1 episode | |
| 1978–1982 | Cop Shop | Noel Lawson / Paul McKinnon / Bob Little / Paul Moorhead | 7 episodes | |
| 1979 | Twenty Good Years | Ron Fielding | 20 episodes | |
| 1980 | Young Ramsay | Ken Murray | 1 episode | |
| 1980 | Rusty Bugles | Vic Richards | TV movie | |
| 1981 | Bellamy | O'Grady | 1 episode | |
| 1982 | The Highest Honor | Cpl. C.M. Stewart | TV movie | |
| 1982 | Sara Dane | Andrew McLeay | Miniseries, 8 episodes | |
| 1984 | The Last Bastion | Harold Holt | Miniseries, 3 episodes | |
| 1985 | A Country Practice | Dave Burchfield | Season 5, 2 episodes | |
| 1985 | Winners | Jack Doyle | 1 episode | |
| 1987 | Fields of Fire | Whacker | Miniseries, 2 episodes | |
| 1988 | The Dirtwater Dynasty | Reverend Mc Bride | Miniseries, 5 episodes | |
| 1988 | Fields of Fire II | Whacker | Miniseries, 2 episodes | |
| 1988 | The True Believers | Edgar Ross | Miniseries, 8 episodes | |
| 1989 | Fields of Fire III | Whacker | Miniseries, 2 episodes | |
| 1990 | G.P. | Malcolm Bishop | 1 episode | |
| 1990 | E.A.R.T.H. Force | Holland | 1 episode | |
| 1990 | Shadows of the Heart | Willy Carter | Miniseries, 2 episodes | |
| 1991 | Brides of Christ | Ken Maloney | Miniseries, 3 episodes | |
| 1991–1995 | Police Rescue | Colley / Tony Fuller (NARC detective) | 3 episodes | |
| 1992 | Big Ideas | Sam Stevens | TV movie | |
| 1993 | Joh's Jury | Geoffrey Woodward | TV movie | |
| 1994 | Time Trax | Ed Lowry | 1 episode | |
| 1994 | Heartland | Jim | 3 episodes | |
| 1994 | Blue Heelers | Geoff Lovett | Season 1, episode 36: "Adverse Possession" | |
| 1996 | Water Rats | Union Representative | Season 1, 1 episode | |
| 1998 | Moby Dick | Captain Peleg | Miniseries | |
| 1998 | Never Tell Me Never | Neville | TV movie | |
| 1998 | State Coroner | Max Capilano | Season 2, 1 episode | |
| 1999 | Big Sky | Minister | 1 episode | |
| 1999 | Wildside | Lionel | Season 2, 1 episode | |
| 1999 | Murder Call | Brian Capper | Season 3, 1 episode | |
| 1999 | Heartbreak High | Owen Croft | Season 7, 2 episodes | |
| 2000 | Grass Roots | Surf Club Manager | Season 1, 1 episode | |
| 2001 | Courts mais GAY: Tome 5 | Dan | TV movie, segment: "Saturn's Return" | |
| 2001 | Outriders | Hayden Simpson | 4 episodes | |
| 2001 | Beastmaster | Kumon | 1 episode | |
| 2001; 2008 | All Saints | Abe / Frank Miller | 2 episodes | |
| 2002 | The Road from Coorain | Rob McLennan | TV movie | |
| 2003 | White Collar Blue | Bruce | Season 4, 1 episode | |
| 2004 | McLeod's Daughters | Ken Logan | Season 4, 1 episode | |
| 2005 | The Secret Life of Us | Bill Davidson | Season 4, 1 episode | |
| 2005 | Home and Away | Jim Wallace | 1 episode | |
| 2006 | Nightmares & Dreamscapes: From the Stories of Stephen King | Vernon Klein | 1 episode | |
| 2008 | The Strip | Bomber Davis | Season 1, 1 episode | |
| 2009 | Underbelly: A Tale of Two Cities | George Joseph | 3 episodes | |

== Theatre ==
| Year | Title | Role | Notes | Ref. |
|---|---|---|---|---|
| 1966 | Two Programs of Short Plays: Men Without Shadows / Le Malentendu | Militiaman / Jan | Jane St Theatre, Sydney with NIDA | |
| 1967 | Camille and Perdican | Father Blazius | UNSW Old Tote Theatre, Sydney with NIDA | |
| 1967 | Point of Departure | Orpheus | UNSW Old Tote Theatre, Sydney with NIDA | |
| 1967 | Three Men on a Horse | Moses | UNSW Old Tote Theatre, Sydney with NIDA | |
| 1967 | The Winter’s Tale | King Leontes | UNSW Old Tote Theatre, Sydney with NIDA | |
| 1968 | Childermas | | UNSW Old Tote Theatre, Sydney | |
| 1968 | A Refined Look at Existence | Donny (Dionysius) | UNSW Old Tote Theatre, Sydney | |
| 1969 | The Knack | Colin | Theatre Royal Sydney | |
| 1974 | The Bride of Gospel Place | | Arts Theatre, Adelaide with South Australian Theatre Company | |
| 1976 | Martello Towers | Lonnie Randall | Nimrod Theatre, Sydney | |
| 1977 | The Club | Danny Rowe | Russell St Theatre, Melbourne with MTC | |
| 1982 | Demolition Job | Quentin | Nimrod Theatre, Sydney | |
| 1985 | The Real Thing | | Sydney Opera House with STC | |
| 1985; 1988 | The Doll Trilogy: Kid Stakes / Other Times / Summer of the Seventeenth Doll | Barney | Sydney Opera House, Melbourne Athenaeum, Pepsico Summerfare, New York with MTC / STC | |
| 2002 | Earl | | Stables Theatre, Sydney | |
