= The Hotline (film) =

- Based on: A Piece of Paper by Dick Wordley
- Written by: Cul Cullen; Dick Wordley
- Starring: Cul Cullen; Max Cullen; John Ewart
- Country of origin: Australia
- Original language: English

Production
- Producer: Dick Wordley
- Running time: 90 minute
- Production company: Harbortop Productions

Original release
- Network: Seven Network
- Release: 1974

The Hotline is a 1974 Australian TV film about a newspaperman who starts writing an advice column.

== Cast ==
- Fred 'Cul' Cullen
- Max Cullen
- John Ewart
- Anna Volska
- Vince Martin
