= Peter Gwynne =

New Zealand-born Australian actor

- Born: 22 September 1929; Auckland, New Zealand
- Died: 17 November 2011 (aged 82); Lane Cove, New South Wales, Australia
- Occupation: Actor
- Spouse: Cecily Polson
- Children: Amanda Gwynne

Peter Gwynne (22 September 1929 – 17 November 2011) was a New Zealand-born Australian television actor who was also known for voice-over work.

== Career ==
Born in New Zealand, Gwynne was a well-recognised character actor, appearing in many of the significant television productions of the 1970s onwards, including Cop Shop, Boney, Division 4, Homicide, Matlock Police, The Flying Doctors, Return to Eden, A Country Practice and many more.

He is best remembered internationally as Bill McMaster, Stephanie Harper's General Manager at Harper Mining in both the 1983 mini-series and the 1986 series of Return to Eden.

== Personal life ==
Gwynne was married to actress Cecily Polson. Peter's mother (Dorothy Wall) was born in Springwood, New South Wales and moved to New Zealand after she married Frank Gwynne from Christchurch. Gwynne last resided at Lane Cove in Sydney, New South Wales. He died on 17 November 2011, aged 82.

== Filmography ==
=== Films ===
Year	Film	Role	Type
1971	Nickel Queen	Andy Kyle	Feature film
1971	Petunia	Narrator/voice	Short film
1972	Like a Summer Storm		TV movie
1973	Chaser		TV movie
1973	Solomon	Bill	TV movie
1973	Linehaul		TV movie
1973	One Good Reason	Colonel Yorke	Short film
1974	Odyssey: A Journey	Narrator/voice	TV movie
1974	The Dove	Fred C. Pearson	
1974	Aboriginal Legends	Narrator/voice	Short films x3
1974	Escape from Singapore		TV movie
1975	Sidecar Racers	Rick Horton	Feature film
1975	Ride a Wild Pony	Sergeant Collins	Disney film
1975	They Don't Clap Losers	Welfare Officer	TV movie
1976	McManus MPB	Sergeant Salisbury	TV movie
1976	Going Home		TV movie
1977	Dot and the Kangaroo	Voice	Animated film
1977	The Tichborne Affair	Bowker	TV film
1979	Tim	Tom Ainsley	Feature film
1983	Peach’s Gold – Land of Gold		
1984	Grave of the President	Narrator	TV movie
1991	Old Scores	Winston Macatamney	TV movie
1993	The Nostradamus Kid	The Shepherd’s Rod	Feature film
2000	The Magic Pudding	Benjamin Brandysnap (voice)	Animated film
2006	Hunt Angels	Rodney Shaw	Docudrama
2008	Australia	Lady Sarah’s Butler	Feature film

=== Television ===
Year	Film	Role	Type
1970	Delta	Len Reeves	TV series, 2 episodes
1970-71	Dynasty	Frank Benson	TV series, 2 episodes
1970-73	Division 4	Mal White / Doug Cooper / Detective Sergeant ‘Frenchy’ Renaud / Hayden Beck	TV series, 4 episodes
1970-74	Homicide	Geoff Adams / Detective Sergeant Ken Davidson / Detective Sergeant Norm Turner / Roger Hamilton / Peter Walters / Joe	TV series, 8 episodes
1971	Dead Men Running		Miniseries, 2 episodes
1971	The Thursday Creek Mob		TV series, 3 episodes
1971	Not Only But Also: Peter Cook & Dudley Moore in Australia	Various characters	Miniseries, 2 episodes
1972	The Far Country	Jack Dorman	TV series, 6 episodes
1972	Boney	Tim Thursley	TV series, 1 episode
1972	Behind the Legend		TV series
1973	Ryan	Raymond Fitch	TV series, 1 episode
1973	Tournai Elephant Boy	Rick Madison	TV series, 1 episode
1973	The Evil Touch	John Quentin / Roger Carlye	TV series, 2 episodes
1973	Seven Little Australians	Mr Hassal	TV series, 4 episodes
1974	This Love Affair	Ian Roarke	TV series
1974	Castaway	Sergeant Holt	TV series, 13 episodes
1974	Behind the Legend		TV series, 1 episode
1974	Out of Love		Miniseries, 1 episode
1975-76	Matlock Police	Detective Sergeant Jack Maloney	TV series
1976	The Emigrants	Les Nicholls	TV series, 1 episode
1976-77	Moynihan	Minister	TV series, 11 episodes
1978	Against the Wind	Francis Mulvane	Miniseries
1982	The Sullivans	Ed Mclaren	TV Series 4 Episodes
1983	Return to Eden	Bill McMaster	Miniseries
1984	Mother and Son	Uncle Tom	TV series Episode: The Funeral
1984	Bodyline	Oxlade	Miniseries, 2 episodes
1986	Return to Eden	Bill McMaster	TV series
1991	Track Record: The Story of Australia’s Railways		
1992	G.P.	Sid Graham	TV series Episode: A Very Suburban Coup
1994-95	Over the Hill	Pat the Poet	TV series
1997	Big Sky	Clem	TV series Episode Coming to Terms
1998	All Saints	Russell Geddes	TV series 2 Episodes Heart to Heart Family Feud
2000	Blue Heelers	Ken Barton	TV Series; 1 episode welcome back
2000	Home and Away	Mr Geraldton	TV series 1 Episode episode 2857
