= They Don't Clap Losers =

- Written by: John Power
- Directed by: John Power
- Starring: Martin Vaughan; Pat Evison; Michele Fawdon
- Country of origin: Australia
- Original language: English

Production
- Producer: John Power
- Running time: 85 mins
- Budget: $1.5 million

Original release
- Network: ABC
- Release: 1 March 1975

They Don't Clap Losers is a 1975 Australian television documentary-drama film directed by John Power. It aired on 1 March 1975, the first night Australian television turned to colour. Power had made a number of drama documentaries for the ABC, including Billy and Percy, Like a Summer Storm and Escape from Singapore.

It later aired in 1977 as an episode of Stuart Wagstaff's World Playhouse.

== Premise ==
Two single parents, Martin and Kay, meet through Children's Court, when their sons are called in on vandalism charges.

== Cast ==
- Martin Vaughan as Martin O'Brien
- Pat Evison
- Michele Fawdon as Kay Lodge
- Jack Charles
- Don Crosby as Magistrate
- Jude Kuring
- Sean Scully
- Drew Forsythe as Priest

== Reception ==
Powers' script won an AWGIE Award.
