= John Derum =

Australian actor (born 1946)

John Derum AM
- Born: John Bernard Derum; 9 January 1946 (age 80); East Melbourne, Victoria, Australia
- Occupations: Actor; theatre producer and director; artistic administrator; local politician

Blue Mountains City Council
- In office 1995–1999

John Bernard Derum AM (born 9 January 1946) is an Australian stage, film and television actor. He is also an artistic administrator and directed and produced for theatre companies throughout Australia and for television. Derum has also been a politician for local council.

== Early life ==
John Bernard Derum was born in St Vincent's Maternity Hospital in East Melbourne (now demolished) on 9 January 1946. He is the son of Scottish immigrants.

From the age of 10, Derum studied and performed in choral music and musical theatre, with the Australian Boys Choir. He also performed and competed in Irish and folk dancing.

== Career ==
=== Screen ===
Derum first appeared on Australian television in the first episode of Homicide in 1964 – a serious role as the delinquent son of a bank security guard. Later, he appeared in another Australian police drama Division 4 (1970–1972). He became well known for his role as Narrator Neville in the first season of the ABC's irreverent satire/comedy The Aunty Jack Show (1972). Derum appeared in a number of comedy and revue series including The Thursday Creek Mob (1971), The True Blue Show (1975), Doctor Down Under (1979) as Doctor Maurice Griffin, and Ratbags (1981). He appeared in the final edition of The Mavis Bramston Show in 1975.

He played B. A. Santamaria in the ABC miniseries True Believers (1988) and Francis James in The Gadfly (1994) and appeared in G.P. and Mother and Son.

For ABC Television, he hosted more than 200 editions of the national quiz The Oz Game and more than 50 episodes of the Australian music and folklore program That's Australia.

Derum lent his voice to the ABC children's animated television series The Adventures of Sam, the animated film Dot and the Kangaroo (1977) and a tv movie version of Wind in the Willows (1988). He also narrated the audio book Sanctuary by Judy Nunn.

His film appearances include Mad Dog Morgan, The Trespassers (1976; as Richard), Kazzam International, and The Night the Prowler (1978; as John).

John Derum has become widely identified with his interpretation of the work of Australian writers, particularly C. J. Dennis. He performed More than a Sentimental Bloke, his tribute to Dennis, more than 500 times around Australia between 1979 and 1994. He has also recorded and performed The Songs of a Sentimental Bloke and the Dennis masterpiece The Glugs of Gosh.

He was twice held offices for Actors Equity and founded an actors support group called "Actor's Forum".

=== Theatre and radio ===
Derum first appeared in theatre the same year he made his TV debut in 1963, after being cast in a production of the George Whaley play Billy Liar at Wal Cherry's Emerald Hill Theatre. Within six months, he was working alongside Googie Withers and Keith Mitchell in a nationwide Shakespeare tour called The First Four Hundred Years. The young actor continued to work and mature and play roles in such productions as The Seagull (Adelaide Festival, 1970), Peer Gynt (Sydney Opera House) and several roles in The Adventures of Nicholas Nickleby (Sydney Theatre Company, 1983–1985), and The Crucible (Sydney Theatre Company) and numerous other revues, musicals and variety performance.

Derum was artistic director of the Canberra Theatre Company in 1985 and 1986.

He was awarded a Literary Fellowship by the Australian Defence Force Academy, which enabled an expanded script of More than a Sentimental Bloke.

Derum served as Manager of the Independent Theatre, from 1996 and 1999, overseeing the restoration and re-opening of the historical theatre.

After his return from the Blue Mountains to Sydney in 2007, he resumed his career as an actor and director. He has directed many rehearsed readings of new scripts, including Waiting for Goterson by Sam Atwell. He played Oscar Wilde in Lady Windermere's Fan and Aiden Turner and David Marsh in David Hare's The Power of Yes in 2010.

== Politics ==
Derum was elected to Blue Mountains City Council from 1995 to 1999 and worked as a political adviser between 2001 and 2007. He was appointed to the Theatre Committee of the NSW Government Arts Advisory Board, and worked on the staff of the NSW Minister for the Environment and Attorney-General and as electorate advisor for three members of parliament.

== Honours and awards ==
Derum was made a Member of the Order of Australia (AM) on 26 January 2019, "for significant service to the performing arts as an actor, director and administrator, and to the community".

== Personal life ==
Derum is married to Jane Gilling and together they have two children, Clancy and Oliver.

== Filmography ==
=== Film ===
Year	Title	Role	Notes
1975	Sidecar Racers	Pete McAllister	
1975	The Great Macarthy	Flatulent Man	
1976	Mad Dog Morgan	Evans	
1976	The Trespassers	Richard	
1976	Kazzam International		
1977	Listen to the Lion		Short film
1977	Dot and the Kangaroo	Voice	Animated film
1978	The Night the Prowler	John Galbraith	
1999	Powderburn	Jess Snr	
2009	Mack and the Boys	Doc	Short film
2009	The Fire	Marcus Brown	Short film
2010	Perspective	Art Teacher	Short film

=== Television ===
Year	Title	Role	Notes
1964	The First 400 Years		Miniseries
1964–1972	Homicide	Ken Webster / Jason Todd / Hooligan / Ray Healy	4 episodes
1965	The Magic Boomerang	The Stand-In	1 episode
1966	Antigone	Haemon	TV play
1966	Australian Playhouse	Son	Episode: "Objector"
1968	Hunter	Chris Frazer	1 episode
1969	The Greater Illustrated History of the Glorious Antipodes Show		
1970	Delta	Staines	1 episode
1970	Mrs. Finnegan	Sanderson	1 episode
1970; 1972	Division 4	Eddy Marshall / Malcolm Tanner	2 episodes
1971	The Thursday Creek Mob	Corporal Ginger Wiseman	
1971	The Comedy Game	Narrator Neville	1 episode
1972	The Aunty Jack Show	Narrator Neville / Various	Season 1, 8 episodes
1973	Our Man in the Company	Peter Goonasekeria	1 episode
1973	The Evil Touch	Charlie	1 episode
1973	The True Blue Show	Host	
1974	The Spiral Bureau (aka Eye of the Spiral)		TV movie
1975	Last Rites		TV movie
1975	Matlock Police	Malcom Newson	1 episode
1975	King's Men	Wills	1 episode
	The Mavis Bramston Show		
1977	The Off Show	Various characters	
1977	Young Ramsay	Robert Sutherland	1 episode
1978	Father, Dear Father in Australia	Andrew Stone	1 episode
1979	Doctor Down Under	Dr. Maurice Griffin	3 episodes
1981	Sporting Chance		1 episode
1981	Ratbags	Various characters	13 episodes
1988	Australians	Len Mauger	Miniseries, 1 episode
1988	Mother and Son	Estate Agent	1 episode
1988	True Believers	B. A. Santamaria	Miniseries, 8 episodes
1988	Wind in the Willows	Toad / Judge / Rabbit	Animated TV movie
1988–1989	The Oz Game	Host	200+ episodes
1990	Winners	Mrs Finkel's Niece's Husband	1 episode
1990	The Gadfly	Francis James	
	That's Australia	Host	50+ episodes
1991	The Last Crop	Carter	TV movie
1991	G.P.	Sam Howard	1 episode
1991	The Last Crop	Carter	TV movie
1992	The Time Game	Wylie	TV movie
1997	The Adventures of Sam	Moon Daughter (voice)	Animated series, 1 episode
1998	Water Rats	Tony Thomas	1 episode
2002	All Saints	John Wheeler	2 episodes
2002	Young Lions	Magistrate	1 episode
2003	Snobs	Mr Alexander	11 episodes
2011	Underbelly	Clarry McMahon	1 episode
2021	Total Control	Father Harry	1 episode

== Theatre ==
=== As actor ===
Year	Title	Role	Notes
1963	Billy Liar		Emerald Hill Theatre, Melbourne
1964	Antigone		Emerald Hill Theatre, Melbourne
1964	The First Four Hundred Years		Australian tour with J. C. Williamson's
1964	Death of a Salesman	Biff	Emerald Hill Theatre, Melbourne
1964	A Slice of Birthday Cake		Russell St Theatre, Melbourne with Union Theatre Repertory Company
1964	Serjeant Musgrave's Dance		Emerald Hill Theatre, Melbourne
1965	Macbeth	Malcolm	Emerald Hill Theatre, Melbourne
1965	You'll Come to Love Your Sperm Test		Australian tour
1965	Oedipus Rex		Emerald Hill Theatre, Melbourne
1965	The Bedsitting Room		Emerald Hill Theatre, Melbourne, Playhouse, Canberra
1966	A Bunch of Ratbags		Emerald Hill Theatre, Melbourne
1966	Private Yuk Objects		Russell St Theatre, Melbourne, Phillip Theatre, Sydney with Union Theatre Repertory Company
1969	This Old Man Comes Rolling Home	Landy	UNSW Old Tote Theatre, Sydney
1969	Present Laughter		Hunter Theatre, Newcastle, Palace Theatre, Sydney with Harry M. Miller
1969	See the Pretty Lights		AMP Theatrette, Sydney with Q Theatre Company
1969	Applicant		AMP Theatrette, Sydney
1969	Hadrian VII		Her Majesty's Theatre, Melbourne with J. C. Williamson's
1970	A Flea in Her Ear		Independent Theatre, Sydney
1970	The Seagull	Kostya	Scott Theatre, Adelaide with STCSA for Adelaide Festival
1970	Cat Among the Pigeons		UNSW Old Tote Theatre, Sydney
1970	Friends		Independent Theatre, Sydney
1970	Enemies		Independent Theatre, Sydney
1971	Filth		Richbrooke Theatre, Sydney
1971	Hamlet on Ice		Nimrod St Theatre, Sydney
1972	Tonight at 8.30: Shadow Play / Red Peppers / Family Album		Russell St Theatre, Melbourne with MTC
1972	Forget-Me-Not Lane	Frank	Russell St Theatre, Melbourne with MTC
1972	Danton's Death		Russell St Theatre, Melbourne with MTC
1972	The Last Supper Show		Nimrod St Theatre, Sydney
1972–1973	The Cherry Orchard		Elizabethan Theatre, Sydney, Comedy Theatre, Melbourne, Playhouse, Perth, Canberra Theatre with MTC
1973	Some of My Best Friends Aren't		Macleay Theatre, Sydney
1975	Ginge's Last Stand		Nimrod St Theatre, Sydney
1975	Peer Gynt		Sydney Opera House with Old Tote Theatre Company
1977	Some Other Town	Frank	Bondi Pavilion, Sydney
1977	The Political Bordello; or, How Waiters Got the Vote	Mr.	Bondi Pavilion, Sydney
1977	The Visit	Mike	Bondi Pavilion, Sydney
1979	Bedroom Farce	Trevor	Australian tour
1980–1981	The Magic Pudding	Voice Over Artist	Australian tour
1980–1985	Piaf: The Songs and the Story		Regent Theatre, Sydney, Seymour Centre, Sydney, Princess Theatre, Melbourne, Universal Theatre, Melbourne
1982	On Our Selection		Playhouse, Canberra
1982	Four Lady Bowlers in a Golden Holden		Canberra Theatre, Kinselas, Sydney with STC
1983–1985	The Adventures of Nicholas Nickleby	William / Mr Mantalini / Mr Snevellicci	Theatre Royal Sydney, State Theatre, Melbourne, Festival Theatre, Adelaide with STC
1984	The Broken Years	Reciter	Australian War Memorial, Canberra
1986	The Nerd	Axel	Australian tour
1986–1987	Are You Lonesome Tonight?	Englishman	Her Majesty's Theatre, Sydney, Festival Theatre, Adelaide
1990	Man, Beast and Virtue		Newtown Theatre, Sydney
1991	Henry IV, Part 1		Sydney Olympic Park, Blackfriars Theatre, Sydney with STC
1991–1993	The Crucible	Reverend Parris	Sydney Opera House, Riverside Theatres Parramatta, Canberra Theatre with STC
1991; 1994	More than a Sentimental Bloke	C. J. Dennis	Marian St Theatre, Sydney, Bridge Theatre, Sydney, University of Sydney, Fairfax Studio, Melbourne, Flinders University, Adelaide
1992	Silent Partner		Stables Theatre, Sydney with Griffin Theatre Company
1992	The Porch / The Great Hunger		Crossroads Theatre, Sydney
1993	The Glugs of Gosh		Bridge Theatre, Sydney with Theatre South
1994	Flesh and Blood		National Maritime Museum, Sydney
1995	Chair in a Landscape		Q Theatre, Penrith
1995; 1998	Sanctuary		Bridge Theatre, Sydney, Lakeview Street Theatre, Newcastle with Theatre South
2000	Split Down the Middle	Stephen	Marian St Theatre, Sydney
2006	Attack of the Granny Boomers		NIDA Parade Theatre, Sydney
2007	ALP Arts Election Launch		Riverside Theatres Parramatta
2009	Lady Windermere's Fan	Lord Augustus Lorton	Darlinghurst Theatre, Sydney
2009	A Safe Pair of Hands		
2010	The Power of Yes	Aiden Turner / David Marsh	Belvoir St Theatre, Sydney
2014	Legend! Slips Cordon – A Safe Pair of Hands	'Slips' Cordon	Old Fitzroy Theatre, Sydney
2016	Senior Moments		Glen St Theatre, Sydney
2018	The Lost Tangerine Jacket	Souvenir Shop Proprietor / John Glebe / Eddie Trigg / 2nd Paddy / Ives, / RAC Member 1 / Hatchet Man 2	Riverside Theatres Parramatta

=== As crew ===
Year	Title	Role	Notes
1964	The Dumb Waiter	Stage Manager	Curzon Cinema, Melbourne
1972	Father Dear, Come Over Here	Director	Russell St Theatre, Melbourne with MTC
1976	Same Difference	Director	Bondi Pavilion, Sydney
1979–1983	More than a Sentimental Bloke	Adaptor	Australian tour
1980–1995	Piaf: The Songs and the Story	Devisor	Regent Theatre, Sydney, Seymour Centre, Sydney, Princess Theatre, Melbourne, Universal Theatre, Melbourne
1983	The Zoo Story	Director	Rehearsal Room, Canberra
1985	Us or Them	Director	Playhouse, Canberra
1985	Don't Pay! Don't Pay!	Director	Playhouse, Canberra
1985	Benefactors	Director	Playhouse, Canberra
1987	Farcearting Around: The Purging / Anatol / The Tenor	Director	Flinders University, Adelaide
1988–1989	Piaf	Devisor	Universal Theatre, Melbourne, Sydney Opera House, Canberra Theatre
1993	The Glugs of Gosh	Director	Bridge Theatre, Sydney with Theatre South
2008	Waiting for Gotterson / Nothing Like Old Times	Director	Newtown Theatre, Sydney with Ferknerkle Productions
2008	The Waxeuse	Director	
2009	Housebound	Director	

== Radio ==
Year	Title	Role	Notes
1979	King Richard	Tony Bailletti	ABC Radio Sydney
1979	Little Lunches	Malcolm	ABC Radio Sydney

== Audio book narration ==
Year	Title	Author
2014	Shearers' Motel	Roger McDonald
2014	Great Australian Drinking Stories	Jim Haynes
	Sanctuary	Judy Nunn
2017	The Desert Column	Ion Idriess
2018	High Voltage	Jeff Apter
2018	Down Under	Trevor Conomy
2019	Moody's Tale: The Story of Corporal Horrie	James Bell Moodie
2019	Heritage	Judy Nunn
2019	Khaki Town	Judy Nunn
2019	Gripped by Drought	Arthur W. Upfield
2019	Killer Instinct: Having a Mind for Murder	Donald Grant
2019	The House of Cain	Arthur W. Upfield
2019	The Great World	David Malouf
2019	Pills, Powder, and Smoke	Antony Loewenstein
2019	A Royal Abduction	Arthur W. Upfield
2020	The Ghost and the Bounty Hunter	Adam Courtenay
2021	Showtime!	Judy Nunn
2021	Araluen	Judy Nunn
2022	The Sentimental Bloke	C. J. Dennis
2022	The Glugs of Gosh	C. J. Dennis
2024	Stories from the Otto Bin Empire	Judy Nunn
