= Logie Awards of 1974 =

16th Logie Awards
- Date: 8 March 1974
- Site: Southern Cross Hotel, Melbourne, Victoria
- Hosted by: Bert Newton
- Gold Logie: Pat McDonald

Television coverage
- Network: Nine Network

The 16th Annual TV Week Logie Awards were presented on Friday, 8 March 1974 at Southern Cross Hotel in Melbourne and broadcast on the Nine Network. Bert Newton was the Master of Ceremonies. Italian film star Gina Lollobrigida and American television actors Tige Andrews, David Cassidy and Macdonald Carey appeared as guests.

== Awards ==
Winners of Logie Awards (Australian television) for 1974:

=== Gold Logie ===
Awards presented by Gina Lollobrigida

Most Popular Male Personality on Australian Television
Winner: Graham Kennedy, The Graham Kennedy Show, Nine Network

Most Popular Female Personality on Australian Television
Winner: Pat McDonald, Number 96, 0-10 Network

=== Logie ===
==== National ====
Best Australian Actor
Winner: Leonard Teale, Homicide, Seven Network

Best Australian Actress
Winner: Pat McDonald, Number 96, 0-10 Network

Best Australian Drama
Winner: Number 96, 0-10 Network

Best Teenage Personality
Winner: Debbie Byrne, Young Talent Time, 0-10 Network

Best Australian Comedy
Winner: The Aunty Jack Show, ABC

Best Australian Music/Variety Show
Winner: Young Talent Time, 0-10 Network

Best Australian Compere
Winner: Bert Newton, The Graham Kennedy Show, Nine Network

Best American Show
Winner: The Mod Squad

Best British Show
Winner: The Benny Hill Show

Best Australian Commercial
Winner: Kingford Cigarettes

Best New Drama
Winner: Seven Little Australians, ABC

Best Script
Winner: Fred Cullen, Homicide, Seven Network

Best News Coverage
Winner: Balsa rafts Chile/Australia trip (Ian Leslie, 0-10 Network)

Best Public Affairs Program
Winner: A Current Affair, Nine Network

Outstanding Contribution To TV Journalism

Winner: Steve Raymond, A Current Affair, Nine Network

Outstanding Single Acting Performance

Winner: Fred Cullen, Homicide, Seven Network

Outstanding Contribution To TV Comedy Writing

Winner: Fred Parsons

Best Single Documentary
Winner: Escape From Singapore, John Power, ABC

Best Documentary Series
Winner: Wild Australia, ABC

Outstanding Creative Effort
Winner: Gordon French, Tommy, Seven Network

Outstanding Contribution To Daytime TV
Winner: Mike Walsh, The Mike Walsh Show, 0-10 Network

==== Victoria ====
Most Popular Male
Winner: Graham Kennedy

Most Popular Female
Winner: Mary Hardy

Most Popular Show
Winner: The Graham Kennedy Show, Nine Network

==== New South Wales ====
Most Popular Male
Winner: Don Lane

Most Popular Female
Winner: Marilyn Mayo

Most Popular Show
Winner: The Don Lane Show, Nine Network

==== South Australia ====
Most Popular Male
Winner: Ernie Sigley

Most Popular Female
Winner: Anne Wills

Most Popular Show
Winner: Adelaide Tonight, Nine Network

==== Queensland ====
Most Popular Male
Winner: Ron Cadee

Most Popular Female
Winner: Dina Heslop

Most Popular Show
Winner: Studio 9, Nine Network

==== Tasmania ====
Most Popular Male
Winner: Trevor Sutton

Most Popular Female
Winner: Jill Morrell

Most Popular Show
Winner: This Week

==== Western Australia ====
Most Popular Male
Winner: Jeff Newman

Most Popular Female
Winner: Sandy Palmer

Most Popular Show
Winner: Stars Of The Future, Seven Network

=== Special Achievement Award ===
George Wallace Memorial Logie For Best New Talent
Winner: Elizabeth Alexander, Seven Little Australians, ABC
