= John Ewart =

Australian actor (1928–1994)

- Born: John Reford Ewart; 26 February 1928; Melbourne, Victoria, Australia
- Died: 8 March 1994 (aged 66); Greenwich, New South Wales Australia
- Education: Scotch College, Hawthorn
- Occupations: Actor, entertainer
- Years active: 1932–1994
- Spouse: Jane Fennell
- Children: 4

John Reford Ewart (26 February 1928 – 8 March 1994) was an Australian actor of radio, stage, television and film. Ewart was a double nominee (and one/time winner) of the AACTA Award for Best Actor in a Supporting Role

== Early life ==
Ewart was born in Melbourne, Victoria to Alfred Adam Ewart, an insurance agent and his wife Jennie Grace Madge Lois (nee Macauley). He was educated at Scotch College, Hawthorn.

== Career ==
Ewart's mother was, he claimed, 'a frustrated actress if I ever saw one' and pushed him 'unwilling' into acting (his father had hoped he would become a dentist). He was cast as Dopey at the age four in a 3XY radio production of Snow White. He was first seen on stage, still a child, in Chekhov's The Proposal. At the age of 18, he made his film debut in the lead role of Mickey O'Riordan in Charles Chauvel's production of Sons of Matthew.

Ewart appeared in hundreds of Australian radio, theatre, film and television productions. To many thousands of Australians who grew up in the 1950s and '60s, he will be remembered as 'Jimmy', the boyishly cheeky co-presenter of the ABC Radio Children's Session, and in the title role of its long-running serial The Muddle-Headed Wombat.

In the 1960s he was involved with the Phillip Street Theatre, notably the 1965-66 production A Cup of Tea, a Bex and a Good Lie Down. In the 1970s he was frequently seen in sitcoms: he told TV Week in 1976 that 'Whenever they want a short, fat, funny looking bloke they call Ewart.'

He was well known for his role in the film Sunday Too Far Away, his ongoing role in the Australian TV series The Restless Years in 1980–81, and his lead role opposite Nicole Kidman in Bush Christmas. He was proudest of his starring role in the 1977 film The Picture Show Man.

== Personal life ==
Ewart married four times, firstly to Lorraine Marie Croke, a Sydney beauty consultant, in May 1951. The couple had twins, a son and a daughter, but divorced a few years later. Ewart then married Susan Mary Newton, a classical singer and actress on radio, stage and TV on 17 April 1966, with whom he had two daughters. They divorced in 1978. On 24 December, he married public relations consultant Patricia De Heer.

In 1992 he became engaged to TV presenter Jane Fennell, but they postponed the wedding after the death of her father, Ewart's long time friend Willie Fennell. They were married on 8 March 1994 in a bedside ceremony as Ewart was dying of throat cancer. He died five days after the wedding.

== Awards and nominations ==
Year	Nominated work	Award	Category	Result
1976	Let the Balloon Go	AACTA Awards	Best Actor in a Supporting Role	Nominated
1977	The Picture Show Man	AACTA Awards	Best Actor in a Supporting Role	Won

== Filmography ==
=== Film ===
- Sons of Matthew (1949) as Mickey O'Riordan
- Bodgie (1959, TV movie) as Kenney
- A Night Out (1961, TV movie) as Albert
- The Man Who Shot the Albatross (1971)
- Solomon (1973, TV movie)
- The Hotline (1974, TV movie)
- Petersen (1974) as Peter
- Sunday Too Far Away (1975) as Ugly
- The Love Epidemic (1975, documentary film)
- Arena (1976, TV movie)
- Master of the World (1976, TV movie) as Voice
- Caddie (1976) as Paddy Reilly
- Let the Balloon Go (1976) as PC Baird
- The Picture Show Man (1977) as Freddie
- Blue Fire Lady (1977) as Mr. Peters
- Newsfront (1978) as Charlie
- Cass (1978, TV movie)
- Plunge Into Darkness (1980, TV movie)
- The Department (1980, TV movie)
- Run, Rebecca, Run (1981) as Minister for Immigration
- Save the Lady (1982) as Uncle Harry
- Deadline (1982, TV movie) as Sam O'Bannon
- Crosstalk (1982) as Stollier
- Fluteman (1982) as Clarence Quint
- Island Trader (1982, TV movie)
- Kitty and the Bagman (1983) as Train Driver
- Bush Christmas (1983) as Bill
- A Slice of Life (1983) as Hughes
- Kindred Spirits (1984, TV movie) as Tommy
- Super Sleuth (1984, TV movie)
- Razorback (1984) as Turner
- Frog Dreaming (1986) as Ricketts
- Dr. Jekyll and Mr. Hyde (1986, TV movie) as Gabriel John Utterson
- The Big Hurt (1986) as Harry Gregory
- John Norton: A Willesee Documentary (1987, TV movie) as John Norton
- Dear Cardholder (1987) as Hart
- The Returning (1990) as Steadman Senior
- Hurricane Smith (1992) as David Griffiths
- Tracks of Glory (1994) as Syd Melville (final appearance)

=== Television ===
- The Hungry Ones (1963)
- Arthur! and the Square Knights of the Round Table (1966) as Voice
- Nice 'n Juicy (1966-67) as Mort Hamlin
- The Barry Crocker Show (1966) as Himself
- Bellbird (1967)
- Contrabandits (1967) as Murdoch
- The Long Arm (1970) as Lenny
- Division 4 (1970-75) as James Barrett / Logan / Paddy Ryan / Alby / Bernie Lewis / Ted Watts / Bob Shaw
- Homicide (1971-74) as Richardson / Derek Thomas / Bert Doyle / Buster White / Andy Simpson / Ron Fisher / Ray
- Matlock Police (1971-75) as Billy Ross / Rob Lucas / Arthur Wilson / Harry Green / Geoff Mitchell / Bob Jones / 'Buttercup' Sands
- Catwalk (1972) as Torchy Byrne
- Behind the Legend as Francis Greenway
- Ryan (1974) as Charlie Bell / Jones
- Ben Hall (1975)
- The Last of the Australians (1975)
- Alvin Purple (1976) as Sos Temple / Bus Driver / Mack / Murray
- Silent Number (1976) as Burton
- King's Men (1976)
- Who Do You Think You Are? (1976)
- Number 96 (1976) as Oswald P. Piper
- The Outsiders (1977) as Frank Kennedy
- The Restless Years (1977) as Chris Hunter
- Cop Shop (1978) as Ted Campbell
- Chopper Squad (1978) as The Bushwalker
- The Truckies (1978) as Spanner
- The Young Doctors (1980) as Horrie Jamison
- Bellamy (1981) as Sid Coleman
- A Country Practice (1981-90) as Lachlan Morrison / Harry Jolly / Clarrie King / Maurie Wilson / Howard Welbourne
- The Girl From Moonooloo (1984) as Derelict
- Special Squad (1984) as Mungo Lennox
- A Fortunate Life (1986, TV miniseries) as Bentley
- The Last Frontier (1986, TV miniseries) as Henry Dingwell
- Mother and Son (1986) as Hospital Worker
- True Believers (1988, TV miniseries) as Fred Daley
- Australians (1988, episode: "John Norton") as John Norton
- The Heroes (1988, TV miniseries) as Bill Reynolds
- Which Way Home (1991, TV miniseries) as Ferguson
- Boys from the Bush (1991)

=== Radio ===
- Son of Inspector Champion
