= China Screen =

Documentary film festival held in Europe

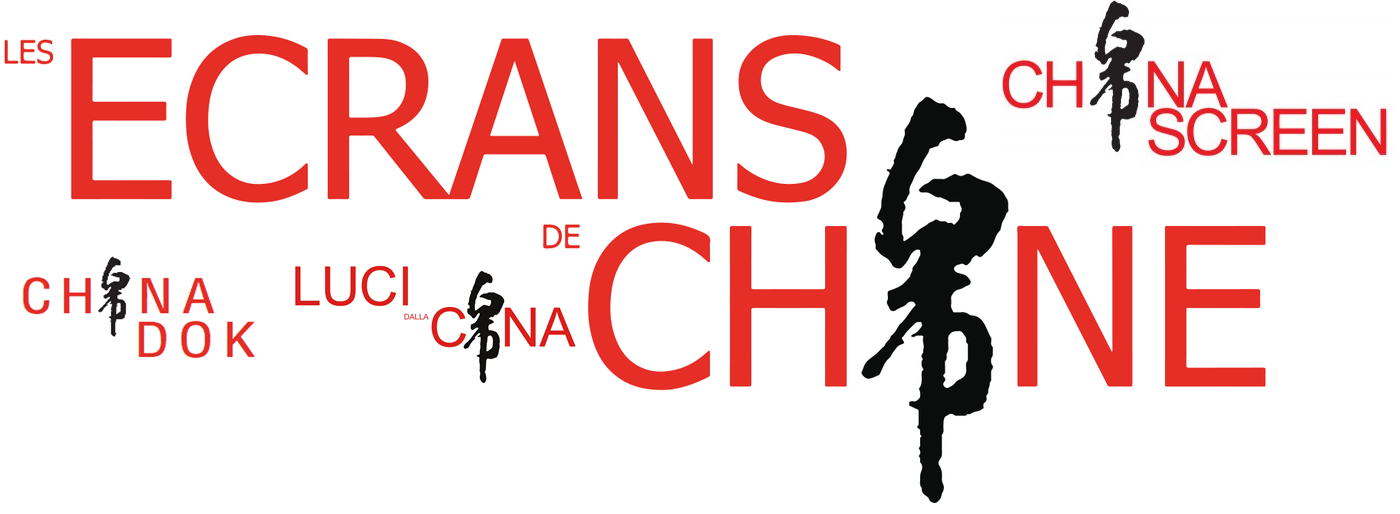
- Opening film: The Two Lives of Li Ermao
- Closing film: Our Time Machine
- Location: Paris
- Founded: 2007
- Awards: Grand Prix: China Screen d'Or, China Screen Prix d'Argent, China Screen Prix spécial du Jury, Prix de la Fondation Ségalen
- Producers: Michel Noll
- Hosted by: Ecrans des Mondes
- Festival date: 02 to 04 October 2020
- Language: French

China Screen is an annual independent Chinese documentary film festival organized by "Les Écrans des Mondes," a non-profit organization founded in 2007 in Paris. Known in France as "Les Écrans de Chine," the festival was set up to promote dialogue about and understanding of modern-day China. Festival president Michel Noll, a documentary producer and director himself, is also the founder of ICTV, the Paris-based documentary production and distribution company, as well as Quartier Latin Media, a small, independent Studio based in London.

The festival has become a Europe-wide event, with several screenings taking place in Italy, Germany, Greece and Finland during the week of the festival.

== Films features in 2022 ==
- American Factory, de Steven Bognar et Julia Reichert, 110 min
- Vivre le tout pour le tout, de Zhou Hao, 96 min
- Pollution à la ville, de Hang Meng, 89 min
- I'm so sorry, de Zhao Liang, 96 min
- La fin des nomades, de Wei Shengze, 75 min
- Masque, de Shen Lianlian, 67 min
- Monsieur Tang, de Su Xia et Su Hongyu, 111 min

== Films features in 2021 ==
- Forêt écarlate, de Jin Huaqing, 83 min
- Un mariage Kazakh en Chine, de Huang Yuqing, 57 min
- Une année, de Zhou Hao, 92 min
- Un village en voie de disparition, de Liu Feifang, 172 min
- Taïwan, une démocratie à l'ombre de la Chine, de Alain Lewkowicz, 52 min
- Le vent du Sud, de Zhang Zhiqiang, 65 min
- Heidi en Chine, de François Yang, 82 min

== Films features in 2020 ==
- Le chirurgien magique, de HAN Jingyuan, 86 min
- Une décision, de Maso Chen, 71 min
- Viens me voir dans mes rêves, de LI Li, 96 min
- De père en fils au pays Hakka, de HUANG Weishan, 73 min
- Notre machine à explorer le temps, de Yang Sun & Leo Chiang, 81 min
- Les deux vies de Li Ermao, de JIA Yuchuan, 89 min
- Les immortels du village, YU Giangyi, 111 min
- Une route pour Xiao Jiang, de Jean-Michel Corillion, 52 min

== Films featured in 2019 ==
- Marceline. Une femme. Un siècle, de Cordelia Dvoràk, 76 min
- Une nouvelle ère, de Boris Svartzman, 71 min
- Rêve chinois, de Léna Karbe & Tristan Coloma, 39 min
- Rêve de Confucius, de Mijie Li, 86 min
- Shangri-la, de Zhou Weiping, 57 min
- Lettre de Mansanja, de LEE Leon, 76 min
- Bonjour Pekin, de Jianying WAN, 85 min
- Soeur ainée, de ZHENG Long, 94 min
- Sulu, de Leiyu QIN, 47 min
- Une rude transition, de Juan LI, 85 min

== Films featured in 2018 ==
- Still Tomorrow, 88 min ·
- A Chinese Sketch Book, 65 min
- I've got the Blues, 90 min
- The Observer, 79 min
- Turtle Rock, 101 min
- Family in the Sinkhole, 71 min
- Song from Maidichong, 81 min
- Lady of the Harbour, 87 min
- Times in a Town, 45 min

== Films featured in 2017 ==
- Lune de fer de Xiaoyu Qin et Feiyue Wu, 84 min
- Les oubliés de la nuit de Jordan Paterson, 95 min
- L'autre moitié du ciel de Patrick Soergel, 80 min
- Mon père et ma mère de Jiao Bo, 88 min
- Les Van Goghs chinois de Yu Haibo et Yu Tianqi Kiki, 80 min
- Les évadés du temples de Patrick Carr, 88 min
- Terres brulées de An Jiaxing, 75 min

Jury : Deanna Gao, Hans Van Duysen, Xiayong Lei, Johannes-Oliver Hamm, Lena Karbe

== Films featured in 2016 ==
- Montagnes de poussière de Zhu Yu, 86 min
- En quête d'amour de Yun Ye, 145 min
- Un jeune patriote de Du Haibin, 105 min
- Sur la piste de Yu Bin de Jean-Christophe Yu, 105 min
- Une porte de secours de Zheng Cherelle, 94 min
- Héros ou Rebelle ? de Larry Chan, 87 min
- Génération 90 de He Wenzhong, 85 min

== Films featured in 2015 ==
- Rendre la lumière de Carol Liu, 52 min
- Prouesses au prix fort de Jin Huaqing, 38 min
- Passion magnolia de Ma Zhidan, 52 min
- Territoires inconnus du collectif Blanck Lands, 85 min
- Le Maire chinois de Zhou Hao, 86 min
- Fleuve de beaux-arts de Shih Charlene, 52 min
- Une ville minée de Jin Huaqing, 27 min
- Recherche âme sœur, désespérément de Chou Tung-yen, 55 min
- La Dernière Danse du dragon de Ma Zhidan et Lu Yang, 52 min
- Madame Duan de Zhang Weixiong, Xiao Cong, Liu Zaili & Deng Jiangao, 52 min
- La Révolte des tournesols (collectif), 120 min
- Les Trois Rêves chinois de Nick Torrens, 85 min
- Fleurs de Taipei de Hsieh Chin-lin, 109 min
- Rendre la lumière de Carol Liu, 55 min
- Rêves de piano de Han Junqian, 54 min
- Pelerinage depuis la Chine de Cammile F.Faylona, 45 min

== Films featured in 2014 ==
4th edition of the festival

- Coton de Zhou Hao, 52 min
- Taishan notre patrie de Xu Hualin, 45 min
- Les Neuf Vies de monsieur Lee de Lei Giazhen et Liang Bahoua, 53 min
- Toujours courir de Jang Dajung, 70 min
- Rêves et réalités, des vies en devenir de Wong Siu Pong, 60 Min
- Les Passe-murailles de Hao Zhiniang, 60 Min
- L'Enfant et la Centrale de Wu Jie, 61 min
- Un père chinois de Ma Zhidan, 45 min
- Un rendez-vous sous les étoiles de Ma Zhidan, 50 min
- Mon chez moi de Cui Yi, 86 min
- Chroniques d'un village ordinaire de Jiao Bo, 97 min
- Le Dernier Petit Train de Chine de Wang Tongxuan, 50 min
- La Vie en roue libre de Shen Ko-Shang, 54 min
- Les jardins secrets de l'empereur de Zhou Bing et Mandy Chang, 56 min
- Pavillon rouge de Lu Jing et Wang Chi, 52 min

== Films featured in 2013 ==
- L'Ancienne Beijing de Stuart Rose, 60 min
- Conçu en Chine de Rob Slater, 60 min
- Pèlerinage depuis la Chine de Camille Faylona, 45 min
- Eaux troubles de Fei Youming et Liu Shuo, 52 min
- Une double peine de Tang Jiongming, 52 min
- Décor de rêves de Zhong Yan, 52 min
- Mes beaux talons de Ho Chao-Ti, 55 min
- E cha de Rong Xie, 90 min
- Rêves de Jin Huaqing, 38 min
- La Fille électro de Zhang Yixin et Lin Jiayi, 21 min
- Les Jardins secrets de l'empereur de Zhou Bing et Mandy Chang, 56 min
- Champs de riz en terrasse de Zhou Weiping, 52 min
- Miroir du vide de Ma Li, 120 min
- Épreuves chinoises de Yang Wang, 73 min
- Un ciel dégagé de Harhuu, 72 min
- Une rencontre de Feng Lei, 85 min
- L'École des champions de Chang Yung, 93 min
- Point d'enquête de Fu Yong, 90 min
- De la Chine vers l'Afrique de Gao Song, 52 min
- Bûcheron de Tu Guangyi, 100 min

== Films featured in 2012 ==
2nd edition of the festival

- La Route du thé de Zhou Weiping et Michel Noll, 100 min
- Le Palais d' été de Zhou Weiping et Michel Noll, 100 min
- Saveurs et Servitudes de Wang Feng, 52 min
- Umbrella de Du Habin, 92 min
- The Bund de Zhou Bing, 105 min
- Solide comme un roc de Shan Zuolong, 52 min
- Mon dernier secret de Li Xiaofeng et Kai Jii, 52 min
- Les Marins verts du Yangtsé de Chen Fu, 52 min
- Disorder de Huang Weikai, 59 min
- Nu Shu, secrets de femmes de Yang Yue-Qing, 54 min
- Du bio, envers et contre tous de Wei Shi, 52 min
- Une vie au village de Zhou Hao et Tan Jiaying, 52 min
- Les Secrets du pigeon laqué de Zheng Xiaolei, 50 min
- La Maison de monsieur Jiang de Gan Choao et Liang Zi, 52 min
- Trois cordes pour deux conteurs de Zhang Wenqing, 52 min
- L'Enfant de personne de Gan Chao, 52 min
- D'un patient à l'autre de Zhang Wenqing, 52 min
- Une saison comme une autre de Zhang Wenqing, 52 min
- Une vie meilleure de Zhao Hao, 52 min
- Mères et Filles de Zheng Xiaolei et Danielle Elissef, 52 min
- 1428 de Du Haibin, 116 min
- Les marins verts du Yangtsé de Chen Fu et Cheng Shiping, 52 min

== Films featured in 2009 ==
- La Maison de monsieur Jiang de Gan Chao et Liang Zi, 52 min
- La Grande Famille de Huang Lingping, 52 min
- Le nouvel abri de Zheng Xiaolei et LI Lin, 52 min
- Nu Shu de Yang Yue-Qing, 52 min
- Rêves de piano de Han Junqian, 52 min
- Les Diplômés de Gao song, 52 min
- L'Enfant de personne de Gan Chao, 52 min
- La Dernière Migration de Huang Lingping et Zhong Yan, 52 min
- Le tribunal itinérant de Zhan Wenqing, 54 min
- Trois cordes pour deux conteurs de Zhang Wenqing, 54 min
- Une saison comme une autre de Zhang Wenqing, 54 min
- D'un patient à l'autre de Zhang Wenqing, 54 min
