= The Thursday Creek Mob =

- Genre: Comedy
- Created by: Colin Free
- Directed by: Eric Tayler
- Starring: Serge Lazareff; John Derum; Joe Hasham; Max Phipps; Peter Gwynne
- Country of origin: Australia
- No. of seasons: 1
- No. of episodes: 15

Production
- Executive producer: Eric Tayler
- Running time: 30 minutes

Original release
- Network: ABC
- Release: 1971 – 1971

The Thursday Creek Mob is an Australian television sitcom which first screened on the ABC in 1971.

== Cast ==
- Serge Lazareff as Pvt Shorty MacGoohan
- John Derum as Corporal Ginger Wiseman
- Joe Hasham as Pvt Squizzy Taylor
- Max Phipps as Lt Wigg
- Red Moore as Major Colin Buckmaster
- Mark Hashfield as Sgt Major Thomas Proudfoot
- James Bowles as Pvt Dim Sims
- Peter Gwynne
- Tim Elliott
- Maggie Kirkpatrick

== See also ==
- List of Australian television series
