= Michel Noll =

French television director and producer (born 1949)

- Born: 10 May 1949 (age 76); Cologne, Germany
- Education: University of Cologne (1973–1979)
- Occupation: Documentary filmmaker
- Spouse: Carol Drinkwater (m. 1988)
- Website: ictv.fr

Michel Noll (born 10 May 1949) is a French television director and producer.

Born in Cologne in Germany, Noll has lived in France for more than 40 years. After studying Economics and Sociology at the University of Cologne in Germany, he became a producer/director of television programmes when, in 1977, he joined TELECIP in Paris, then the leading French independent production company.

In 1982, he was asked to launch Revcom Television as the independent television arm of French publishing group 'Éditions Mondiales', which he quickly turned into one of the most successful and international of French production companies, with subsidiaries in Germany, the United Kingdom and Australia.

In 1987, he launched his own production house Quartier Latin, specialising in children's programs and documentaries. In 1995, he acquired the well-established distribution company ICTV, which specialised in documentary films covering current affairs and social issues.

Since the year 2000, he started to move away from television into the movie industry, producing and/or directing several feature documentaries.

He is the curator of four documentary film festivals and their associated cinema clubs: Les Ecrans de Chine (China Screen), Focus Corée (Focus on Korea), Docs d'Afrique (African Documentaries) and GrecDoc (Greek Documentaries). With his not-for-profit association Ecrans des Mondes, he also co-organizes the documentary festival Beyond Borders in Kastellorizo.

He is married to Anglo-Irish author and actress Carol Drinkwater.
