= Australians (TV series) =

1988 Australian television series

Australians (also known as Michael Willesee's Australians) is a thirteen part anthology documentary drama series which screened on the Seven Network in 1988.

A lavishly illustrated spin-off coffee table book was released the same year. It was written by Roger McDonald and published Bantam Books.

The series was not the idea of Willesee's, but his company, Transmedia was involved.

== Episodes ==
The episodes focused on famous individuals (with one exception covering soldier settlers):

- Les Darcy⁣ – starring Peter Phelps
- Private John Simpson⁣ – starring Robert Willox
- Vivian Bullwinkel⁣ – starring Rachel Ward
- Mary Mackillop⁣ – starring Lorna Lesley
- Lottie Lyell⁣ – starring Odile Le Clezio
- Lola Montez – starring Linda Cropper
- Clyde Fenton – starring Scott Burgess
- Jack Davey⁣ – starring Rhys McConnochie
- Betty Cuthbert – starring Helen Mutkins
- Gordon Bennett – starring Bill Kerr
- Errol Flynn – starring Christopher Stollery
- John Norton – starring John Ewart

== Episode 1: Les Darcy ==
March 1, 1988. Written by John Upton, directed by Kevin Dobson.

=== Cast ===
- Peter Phelps as Les Darcy
- Gia Carides as Winnie O'Sullivan
- Gus Mercurio as Tex Rickard
- Annie Byron as Mrs O'Sullivan
- Robin Howering as William Hughes
- Nikki Coghill as Lilly Molloy
- Michael Caton as Mr Darcy
- Kerry Walker as Mrs Darcy
- Greg Stone as Mick King
- Ned Manning as Mick Hawkins

=== Synopsis ===
Les Darcy was a champion Australian boxer, whose promising future was cut short when his mother prevented him from joining the Australian troops in World War I (leading to accusations of cowardice), and when he met an untimely death at age 21 due to septicaemia.

== Episode 2: Private John Simpson ==
March 8, 1988. Written by Roger McDonald. Directed by Henri Safran.

=== Cast ===
- Robert Willox as John Simpson
- Peter Fisher as Private Grimshaw
- Lyndon Harris as Captain Fry
- Kevin Healy as Col. Ryan
- Mark McAskill as Private Pratley
- Vic Rooney as Lr. Col. Sutton
- Peter Turnbull as Private Gillies
- David Wenham as Wounded Soldier (uncredited)

=== Synopsis ===
Private John (Jack) Simpson was a stretcher bearer during World War I, who went into the line of fire in Gallipoli, rescuing wounded soldiers. In the absence of stretchers, Simpson borrowed a donkey to carry the wounded back to base camp. His deeds of bravery, made him a war hero and an Australian icon.

== Episode 3: Vivian Bullwinkel ==
March 15, 1988. Written by Anne Brooksbank. Directed by Rod Hardy.

=== Cast ===
- Rachel Ward as Vivian Bullwinkel
- Barry Quinn as Private Kinsley
- Julie Hamilton
- Jo Kennedy

=== Synopsis ===
Vivian Bullwinkel was a volunteer nurse during World War 2. While being evacuated from Singapore, her ship sank – upon which she was captured and shot by the Japanese occupying Banka Island.

== Episode 4: Mary MacKillop ==
March 22, 1988. Written by John Misto. Directed by Mark Callan.

=== Cast ===
- Lorna Lesley as Mary MacKillop
- Kerry Armstrong as Matron
- Annie Byron
- Nicholas Eadie
- George Whaley

=== Synopsis ===
Sister Mary MacKillop founded the Sisters of St Joseph of the Sacred Heart, a congregation of nuns who established schools and welfare institutions throughout Australasia, with an emphasis on education for the poor. The order put itself outside the control of the local bishop, breeding resentment within areas of the Catholic church.

== Episode 5: Lottie Lyell ==
March 29, 1988. Written by Anne Brooksbank. Directed by Ben Lewin

=== Cast ===
- Odile Le Clezio as Lottie Lyell
- Robert Coleby as Raymond Longford
- Michele Fawdon as Melena Longford
- Judi Farr as Ma (Mrs Lyell)
- Joy Hruby as Mrs Whittle
- Jeff Truman as Arthur Tauchert
- Danny Adcock as Arthur Higgins
- Peter Adams as Mr Dutton

=== Synopsis ===
Lottie Lyell, widely regarded as Australia's first film star, also worked behind the cameras as a screenwriter, filmmaker, art director, costume designer, editor, and business manager. She significantly contributed to the Australian film industry during the silent era.

== Episode 6: Lola Montez ==
April 5, 1988. Written by Tony Morphett. Directed by Ian Gilmour.

=== Cast ===
- Linda Cropper as Lola Montez
- Nicholas Eadie as Folland
- Peter Whitford as Mr Crosby
- Pat Thomson as Mrs Crosby
- Bruce Barry as Wellesley
- Danny Adcock as Harry Seekamp
- Warwick Moss as Captain
- Ben Gabriel as San Francisco doctor
- Robyn Forsythe as Auditionee #1

=== Synopsis ===
Lola Montez was an internationally renowned singer and dancer, whose world tour included an Australian leg, entertaining miners during the gold rush of the 1850s.

== Episode 7: Clyde Fenton ==
April 12, 1988. Directed by John Power.

=== Cast ===
- Scott Burgess as Clyde Fenton
- Kerry Armstrong as Martin
- Bruce Spence as Dr Cecil Cook
- Martin Vaughan as Mr Jackson

=== Synopsis ===
Clyde Fenton was a pilot and surgeon who played a pioneering role in the development of the successful Flying Doctor Service. His work in providing medical assistance to remote communities earned him widespread recognition in the Northern Territory.

== Episode 8: Jack Davey ==
April 19, 1987. Written by Geoffrey Atherden. Directed by George Whaley.

=== Cast ===
- Rhys McConnochie as Jack Davey
- Shane Briant as Tony Ferguson
- Loene Carmen as Betty Fitzgerald
- Syd Conabere as Angus Moore
- John Derum as Len Mauger
- Les Foxcroft as The Doctor
- Ron Haddrick as Tom Stone
- Julie Hamilton as Gwennie Moore
- Alan David Lee as Arthur Cushing
- Martin Vaughan as Ced Fitzgerald

=== Synopsis ===
Australian singer and radio personality Jack Davey was one of the first to enter the first around-Australia car rally, the Redex Trial, amid a battle with his health.

== Episode 9: Betty Cuthbert ==
April 26, 1988. Written by Denise Morgan. Directed by Kathy Mueller.

=== Cast ===
- Helen Mutkins as Betty Cuthbert
- Deborah Kennedy as June Ferguson
- Lynette Curran as Mrs Cuthbert
- Neil Fitzpatrick as Speaker

=== Synopsis ===
Betty Cuthbert was an Australian athlete and a four-time Olympic champion, dubbed Australia's 'Golden Girl'. During her career, she set multiple world records and endeared herself to the sporting world through her talent, courage and positive attitude.

== Episode 10: General Gordon Bennett ==
May 3, 1988. Written by John Misto.

=== Cast ===
- Bill Kerr as Gordon Bennett
- Andrew Lloyde
- Edmund Pegge as General Percival

=== Synopsis ===
General Gordon Bennett was a highly decorated Australian army general who served in both World War I and World War II. After Singapore fell to the Japanese in 1942, he fled back to Australia, while his men became prisoners of the Imperial Japanese Army. After the war, his escape spurned a Royal Commission and military enquiry.

== Episode 11: Soldier Settlers ==
May 10, 1988. Directed by George Ogilvie.

=== Synopsis ===
Following World Wars I and II, Australian farming estates were divided up into small farms and given to war veterans by the Federal Government, in an effort to populate the Australian inland, including the Durkin Family.

== Episode 12: Errol Flynn ==
May 24, 1988. Written by John Lonie. Directed by Michael Carson.

=== Cast ===
- Christopher Stollery as Errol Flynn
- Nell Schofield as Scotty
- Timothy Conigrave as Cooper-Smith
- Terence Donovan as Old Errol
- Rhys McConnochie as Scott Dumaresq
- Jeanette Cronin as Irene
- Paul Sonkkila as Bill Stubbs
- Deidre Rubenstein as Nance

=== Synopsis ===
Errol Flynn was an Australian actor who achieved international fame during Hollywood's Golden Age, and was particularly known for his romantic swashbuckler roles.

== Episode 13: John Norton ==
May 17, 1988.

=== Cast ===
- John Ewart as John Norton
- Bartholomew John as Dick Meagher
- James Lovell as Ezra Norton

=== Synopsis ===
John Norton was a journalist, editor and one of Australia's earliest and most successful newspaper barons. His ambitious nature saw him elected to the New South Wales Parliament three times, and he was considered one of Australia's most controversial public figures.

== See also ==
- List of Australian television series
