= Heads 'N Tails =

Australian children's television show (1983)

- Written by: Janis Balodis; Pamela Van Amstel; Ken Cameron; Jane Oehr
- Directed by: Jane Oehr
- Starring: Steve Bergan; Jim Filipovski; John Ekman; Bernadette Hughson; Jane Stevens; Maria de Costa
- Theme music composer: Marc Hunter
- Country of origin: Australia
- Original language: English
- No. of seasons: 1
- No. of episodes: 6

Production
- Producer: Kay Francis
- Editor: Henry Dangar
- Running time: 8 minutes

Original release
- Network: ABC
- Release: 1983 – 1983

Heads 'N Tails is an Australian television series broadcast on the ABC in 1983. It was a series of eight six-minute episodes. It was later combined and screened as a film. The series was produced by Health Media Productions who wanted to make a drama kids could relate to. Each episode was left hanging with a "What should I do?" scenario.

Deirdre MacPherson of The Sydney Morning Herald called it a "startlingly good series for young people". The Age's Buff's choice writer said of the film that it "is cleverly plotted, but there a patronising whiff about it."

== Awards ==
- 1984 Penguin Award
  - Special Penguin Award for Children's Drama - won
- 1984 Australian Film Institute Awards
  - Best Achievement in Editing in a Non Feature Film - Henry Dangar - nominated
  - Best Screenplay in a Non-Feature Film - Janis Balodis, Ken Cameron, Jane Oehr, Pamela Van Amstel - nominated
  - Best Achievement in Sound in a Non-Feature Film - John Franks, Ken Hammond, Alasdair Macfarlane - nominated
