= Go Health =

Australian health television show (~1980s)

- Developed by: Jane Oehr
- Directed by: Jane Oehr
- Starring: Tom McPartland
- Country of origin: Australia
- Original language: English

Production
- Producers: Lyn Norfor; Kay Bellve
- Running time: 5 minutes

Original release
- Network: TCN9

Go Health is an Australian health educational television program aimed at 4-14 year olds. It screened on channel 9 and some regional stations before also being screened by the ABC. The series was produced by Health Media Productions and funded by the Department of Health. As at June 1983, nearly 400 episodes had been created.
