= Stirring (film) =

1975 short film

- Directed by: Jane Oehr
- Written by: Jane Oehr
- Produced by: Timothy Read
- Edited by: Warwick Hercus
- Production company: Film Australia
- Release date: 1975
- Running time: 60 minutes
- Country: Australia
- Language: English
- Budget: $20,000

Stirring is a 1975 Australian documentary directed by Jane Oehr. It follows a high school class as they examine corporal punishment in schools. It was given a suppression order by the Education Department.

In The Sydney Morning Herald Martha DuBose noted "The film works well as a teacher's aid, showing clearly how effective this novel and persistent approach can be. But it is also very good cinema for a non-specialist audience. Everyone can relate to the student' feeling of impotence in confrontation with an institutionalised procedure, and many can find hope in the boys' burgeoning awareness of the complexities of an issue and the acquired sense of group power." A review in the journal Education said it "effectively lays bare some of the iniquities of our creaking education system. But in providing an audience with a first-hand glimpse of the powerful consequences of a minor experiment, it is a sometimes exhilirating (sic) experience."

Stirring won the Silver Prize for Best Documentary Award at the 17th Australian Film Awards Australian Film Institute Awards after the preselectors reported "a new measure of assurance in works dealing with current, and often contentious, social issues. It seems that Australian documentary film makers can now be relied on to pursue a commitment without lapsing into stridency and heavyhandedness".
