= The Picture Show Man =

- Directed by: John Power
- Written by: Joan Long
- Based on: memoirs of Lyle Penn
- Produced by: Joan Long
- Starring: John Meillon; John Ewart; Rod Taylor; Garry McDonald
- Cinematography: Geoff Burton
- Music by: Peter Best
- Production company: Limelight Productions
- Distributed by: Roadshow; Umbrella Entertainment
- Release date: 5 May 1977
- Running time: 98 minutes
- Country: Australia
- Language: English
- Budget: AU$600,000 or $619,340
- Box office: AU$566,014 (Australia)

The Picture Show Man is a 1977 Australian film directed by John Power, about a travelling film exhibitor (John Meillon) in the 1920s. He has to deal with the rebelliousness of his son (Harold Hopkins) and a rival American exhibitor (Rod Taylor).

The film was Rod Taylor's first role in an Australian film for over twenty years. He was cast as an American because the producer was concerned about his ability to perform in an Australian accent.

== Premise ==
Maurice Pym is a travelling cinema operator in the 1920s who tours country New South Wales with his son Larry and pianist Freddie.

== Cast ==
- Rod Taylor as Palmer
- John Meillon as Mr Pym
- John Ewart as Freddie
- Harold Hopkins as Larry Pym
- Patrick Cargill as Fitzwilliam
- Yelena Zigon as Madame Cavalli
- Garry McDonald as Lou
- Sally Conabere as Lucy
- Judy Morris as Miss Lockhart
- Gerry Duggan as Hall Secretary
- Jeanie Drynan as Mrs Duncan
- Don Crosby as Major Lockhart

== Production ==
The film was based on the memoirs of Lyle Penn, whose father was a travelling film exhibitor. He saw Joan Long being interviewed on television about her documentary on early Australian cinema, The Pictures That Moved and sent his memoirs to her. She optioned them and adapted it into a screenplay. Long was reluctant to direct the movie, and she hired John Power.

The film was funded by the Australian Film Commission ($250,000), the New South Wales government ($120,000), the Women's Film Fund, private investors and with support from then-Premier of New South Wales Neville Wran.

Shooting began on 17 October 1976 and went until 4 December, a total of seven weeks. It took place in and around Tamworth. Relations between Joan Long and John Power were not always smooth, and the two occasionally clashed over interpretation.

== Release ==
=== Box office ===
The film was a medium success at the box office. It won Australian Film Awards for Best Art Direction, Costume Design and Supporting Actor (Rod Taylor).

=== Home media ===
The Picture Show Man was released on DVD with a new print by Umbrella Entertainment in July 2005. The DVD is compatible with all region codes and includes special features such as the original theatrical trailer, an interview with Rod Taylor, and audio commentary with Harold Hopkins, Sally Conabere, Judy Morris and Sue Milliken.
