= On the Loose (1984 film) =

- Directed by: Jane Oehr
- Written by: Part 1: Ken Cameron; Part 2: Jane Oehr; Mark Stiles; Part 3: Tim Gooding; Tom McPartland
- Produced by: Lyn Norfor
- Cinematography: Tom Cowan
- Edited by: Greg Bell, Ted Otton
- Music by: Todd Hunter
- Release date: 1984
- Running time: 83 mins
- Country: Australia
- Language: English

On the Loose is a 1984 Australian film consisting of a trilogy of stories about teenagers in modern society.

== Plot ==
Set in and around the inner-Sydney suburb of Glebe, the film focuses on the challenges and uncertainty of three teenage school leavers as they finish high school and are faced with navigating the outside world in the mid-1980s, including sexual harassment in the workplace and unemployment. The anthology film consisted of three parts: “Exit Eddie Leech”, “Ring of Confidence” and “Beginner’s Luck”.

== Cast ==
- Steve Bergan as Eddie Leech
- Tamsin Hardman as Nicole Jones
- Jim Filipovski as Nick Malinowski
- Carole Skinner as Mrs Jones
- Maria DaCosta as Stella
- John Hamblin as Noel Poulson
- Ray Meagher as Russell Leech
- Garry Who as Cane Toad
- Patrick Phillips as Barry Glover
- John Smythe as Mr. Stenning
- Ron Hackett as Mr. Cutler

== Release ==
The film screened at the 1985 Sydney Film Festival and the 1986 Sundance Film Festival.

== See also ==
- Cinema of Australia
