= The True Blue Show =

Australian sketch comedy television series

The True Blue Show is an Australian sketch comedy television series which screened on the Seven Network from 1973 to 1974. The show debuted in July 1973 as a comedy special, with a regular series airing later in the year. The one-hour program was produced at Sydney's ATN7 and featured Gerry Gallagher, Sue Walker, John Derum and Emma Gray.
