= Carol Drinkwater =

British actress, writer and filmmaker (born 1948)

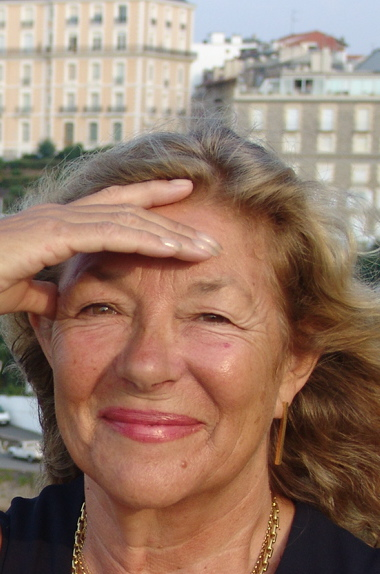
- Drinkwater in 2012
- Born: 22 April 1948 (age 78); London
- Occupations: Actress; author; filmmaker
- Spouse: Michel Noll (m. 1988)
- Relatives: Linda Regan (sister)
- Website: caroldrinkwater.com

Carol Drinkwater (born 22 April 1948) is a British actress, writer and filmmaker residing in France. She portrayed Helen Herriot (née Alderson) in the television adaptation of the James Herriot books All Creatures Great and Small, which led to her receiving the Variety Club Television Personality of the Year award in 1985.

== Career ==
Drinkwater was a member of the National Theatre Company under the leadership of Laurence Olivier and has acted in numerous television series and films including Chocky, Bouquet of Barbed Wire, Another Bouquet, Golden Pennies and as Roz, an acquaintance of Det. Insp. Jack Regan in The Sweeney.

Drinkwater won a Critics' Circle Best Screen Actress award for her role, Anne, in the feature film Father (1990) in which she appeared opposite Max von Sydow. Amongst many other film and television series, she has appeared in Stanley Kubrick's A Clockwork Orange (1971), Queen Kong (1976), The Shout (1978), Father (1990), and the film adaptation of Beryl Bainbridge's novel An Awfully Big Adventure (1995), directed by Mike Newell and starring Hugh Grant and Alan Rickman.

=== All Creatures Great and Small ===
Drinkwater portrayed Helen Herriot (née Alderson), the wife of James Herriot, for the first three series of the original BBC television series All Creatures Great and Small. She left the role in 1985 after appearing in 39 episodes. She later said:

I'd given everything I could and I couldn't think where else I could take the role, because there was no more material. I wasn't leaving in any kind of spiteful thing. The BBC was so angry with me, they put a ban on using me. So they re-cast and another actress got the role. I was terribly upset because it was a wonderful role and would have been very good for me. I must say now, looking back on my career, it's one of the few things in my life I would do differently, and I wouldn't have left.

"Carol will always remain my favourite actress," All Creatures make-up artist Maggie Thomas recalled;

She was a breath of fresh air; never moody or difficult, a warm, merry and very natural girl. I can remember our first day on location. We were only working with Chris and a cow, which had fallen and become stuck in a small burn, so Carol had decided to come out to watch and meet everyone. She hadn't got any scenes that first day, so she was dressed for the summer in her own clothes. The shorts she wore were kind of Boy Scout-cum-M*A*S*H ex-army drill, but on her figure they looked anything but. There was always an impishness about her and an air of complete unawareness of her own effect on men. The male members of the crew went into meltdown. She was oblivious, smiling and chatting to everyone, just enjoying the beautiful weather and getting to know who was who on the crew. They all remained in love with her for as long as she was the leading lady.

=== Later career ===
In the 1981 episode of the Granada Television series Lady Killers she played Margaret Seddon, wife of the Edwardian poisoner Frederick Seddon, in an episode entitled "Root of All Evil."

While working in Australia, Drinkwater wrote her first successful children's book, The Haunted School. She has since written further children's books. The Haunted School was produced as a television mini-series and film. Bought by Disney, it won the Chicago International Film Festival Gold Award for Children's Films. It was through this that she met her husband, Michel Noll, and relocated to Provence.

Her books for adults include commercial fiction and a series of best-selling memoirs about her experiences on her olive farm in Provence. In 2013, Drinkwater worked on a series of five documentary films inspired by her two Mediterranean travel books, The Olive Route and The Olive Tree. The Olive Route films were completed in February 2013 and have since been broadcast on international networks worldwide.

In 2015, Penguin Books UK announced a deal signed with Drinkwater to write two epic novels. The first, The Forgotten Summer, was published in March 2016. The second, The Lost Girl, was published in June 2017. Drinkwater alleged to The Guardian, in October 2017, that the experience of the starlet Marguerite in The Lost Girl was based on her own experience of being sexually assaulted by Elia Kazan while auditioning for the leading film role in his film The Last Tycoon (1976).

In 2018, Penguin signed a second deal with Drinkwater for two further novels. The first, published in May 2019, was The House on The Edge of The Cliff. The second, An Act of Love, was published on 29 April 2021.

During the summer of 2021, Drinkwater spent four months filming a six-part documentary film series for UK's Channel 5 called Carol Drinkwater’s Secret Provence. The filming took place across Provence from the Italian border to the Camargue in the west of southern France.

== Personal life ==
Drinkwater is the daughter of the bandleader and agent Peter Regan (born Peter Albert Drinkwater) and Irish nurse Phyllis McCormack; her sister is actress and author Linda Regan. She was unrelated to the late actress Ros Drinkwater, although the contrary has sometimes been suggested to be the case.

Drinkwater was born in London, and acquired her Irish passport (later in life) because she felt vulnerable when travelling on a British passport in certain countries, including those in North Africa.

During the 1978–1980 first run of All Creatures Great and Small, she had an affair with her on-screen husband, Christopher Timothy, which Drinkwater claims resulted in negative behaviour towards her by members of the general public.

She is married to French television producer Michel Noll, and has two stepdaughters from Noll's first marriage.

In 2017, Drinkwater accused the late American film director Elia Kazan of sexual harassment and attempted rape in 1975 when she was under consideration for a part in Kazan's film The Last Tycoon.

== Filmography ==
=== Film ===
Year	Title	Role	Notes
1971	A Clockwork Orange	Nurse Feeley	
1976	Queen Kong	Ima Goodbody	
1978	The Shout	Cobbler’s Wife	
1990	Father	Anne Winton	
1995	An Awfully Big Adventure	Dawn Allenby	

=== Selected television ===
- Sam (1975) as Liz Chadwick
- Bouquet of Barbed Wire (1976) as Barbara
- Bill Brand (1976) as Pat
- Softly, Softly: Task Force (1976) as Bonnie Danley
- Another Bouquet (1977) as Barbara
- The Sweeney (1978) as Roz
- All Creatures Great and Small (1978-1985) as Helen Herriot
- Lady Killers (1981) as Margaret Seddon
- Tales of the Unexpected (1982) as Linda Larch
- The Agatha Christie Hour (1982) as Violet Eversleigh
- Chocky (1984) as Mary Gore
- Golden Pennies (1985) as Rebecca Greenwood
- The Haunted School (1987) as Fanny Crowe
- Captain James Cook (1987-1988) as Elizabeth
- A Mind to Kill (1997) as Melanie Caulfield
- Coming Home (1998) as Aunt Biddy
- Peak Practice (2000) as Helen Barton
- Casualty (2000) as Frances Lawson

== Bibliography ==
=== The Olive Series ===
- The Olive Farm: A Memoir of Life, Love and Olive Oil in the South of France (Little, Brown and Company, 2001) ISBN 0142001309
- The Olive Season: Amour, a New Life and Olives Too (Little, Brown & Company, 2003) ISBN 978-0316861168
- The Olive Harvest: A Memoir of Love, Life and Olives in the South of France (Weidenfeld & Nicolson, 2004) ISBN 978-0297847809
- A Celebration of Olives (Little, Brown and Company, 2004) 978-0316728034
  - a compilation of The Olive Farm and The Olive Season
- The Illustrated Olive Farm (Weidenfeld & Nicolson, 2005) ISBN 978-0297844044
- The Olive Route: A Personal Journey to the Heart of the Mediterranean (Weidenfeld & Nicolson, 2006) ISBN 978-0297847892
- The Olive Tree: A Personal Journey Through Mediterranean Olive Groves (Weidenfeld & Nicolson, 2008) ISBN 978-0297847748
  - shortlisted for Travel Book of the Year, Travel Press Awards 2009
- Return To the Olive Farm (Weidenfeld & Nicolson, 2010) ISBN 978-0297856948

=== My Story Series ===
- The Hunger: The Diary of Phyllis McCormack, Ireland, 1845–1847
- Suffragette: The Diary of Dollie Baxter, London 1909–1913
- Twentieth Century Girl: Diary of Flora Bonnington London 1899–1900
- Nowhere to Run (the story of a World War II Jewish refugee), published 2 August 2012
- Cadogan Square – a compilation of Suffragette and Twentieth-Century Girl August 2012

=== Other works ===
- One Summer in Provence (July 2025)
- An Act of Love (April 2021)
- The House on the Edge of the Cliff (May 2019)
- The Love of a Stranger (Kindle Single, September 2017)
- The Lost Girl (2017)
- The Forgotten Summer (2016)
- A Simple Act of Kindness (Kindle Single, September 2015)
- The Only Girl in the World (Young Adult novel, 2014 ISBN 978-1407138954)
- Hotel Paradise (Kindle Single, March 2014)
- The Girl in Room Fourteen (Kindle Single 2013)
- Because You're Mine (2001)
- Crossing the Line: Young Women Talk About Being in Trouble with the Law (2000)
- Molly on the Run (1996)
- Molly (1996)
- Mapping the Heart (1993)
- Akin to Love (1992)
- An Abundance of Rain (1989)
