= The Spiral Bureau =

- Directed by: Ian Coughlan
- Starring: Peter Sumner; Wendy Hughes; John Derum
- Country of origin: Australia
- Original language: English

Production
- Producer: Roger Mirams
- Running time: 90 minutes
- Production company: South Pacific

Original release
- Network: Nine Network
- Release: 1976

The Spiral Bureau is a 1974 Australian television film directed by Ian Coughlan and starring Peter Sumner, Wendy Hughes, and John Derum. The screenplay concerns three psychic researchers.
