= Father (1990 film) =

- Directed by: John Power
- Starring: Max von Sydow; Julia Blake; Carol Drinkwater; Steve Jacobs
- Distributed by: Fox Lorber Home Video
- Release date: 1990
- Running time: 100 minutes
- Country: Australia
- Language: English

Father is a 1990 film about a retired German immigrant living in Australia, Joe Muller (Max von Sydow), who is accused by a strange woman named Iya Zetnick (Julia Blake) of being a former Nazi who committed war crimes during the Second World War. His daughter, Anne Winton (Carol Drinkwater), is not certain whom to believe.

The film was directed by John Power, written by Tony Cavanaugh and Graham Hartley and produced by Barron Entertainment and Film Victoria. At the 1990 AFI awards, Max von Sydow won the 'Best Actor in a Lead Role' category, and Julia Blake won the 'Best Actress in a Supporting Role'. The film was also entered into the 17th Moscow International Film Festival.

== Cast ==
- Max von Sydow as Joe Muller
- Julia Blake as Iya Zetnick
- Carol Drinkwater as Anne Winton
- Steve Jacobs as Bob Winton
- Simone Robertson as Rebecca Winton
- Kahli Sneddon as Amy Winton
- Reg Evans as Old Charlie
- Nico Lathouris as Amos
- Nicholas Bell as Paul Jamieson
- Tim Robertson as George Coleman
- Jon Concannon as Ron
- Bianca Briam as Iya Zetnick (age 12)
- Eve von Bibra as Roxy
- Brenda Addie
- Colin Vancao
- Nancy Black
- Ben Mitchell as Police officer
- Kate Langbroek as TV reporter
- Richard Carter
- Robert Morgan as Pub brawler
- Tiber Gyapjas

== Plot ==
The film begins with a scene of an open pit full of shot naked bodies somewhere in Lithuania during the Second World War. A young Iya Zetnick crawls out of the bodies in tears, apparently having survived a massacre.

Decades later in modern-day Melbourne Joe Muller and his affable family are introduced. His adult daughter Anne lives with him, and one day she receives a phone call from Iya Zetnick, asking her to ensure she watches a television current affairs show coming up. Joe thinks it concerns a trivial matter about his business, but he and his family are shocked when the show instead links him to the massacre of Iya's family in Lithuania.

Joe suddenly becomes the centre of attention. His family sticks by him, but some seeds of doubt are sown. Eventually he is arrested and sent to trial, but is found not guilty on account of insufficient evidence. Still, Anne is now increasingly concerned about her father's past, and confronts him.

Iya breaks into their house, armed with a pistol. She confronts Anne and her father, and when she is capable of shooting Joe, she shoots herself instead. Anne is left in no doubt about her father's crimes, and Joe is left estranged from his family.

== See also ==
- Cinema of Australia
