= A Single Life (1985 film) =

- Directed by: John Power
- Written by: Mark Poole, John Power
- Produced by: Hugh Rule
- Starring: Tina Bursill; Steve Jacobs; Pamela Rabe; Terence Donovan; Terry McDermott
- Cinematography: Vladimir Osherov
- Edited by: Ian Lang
- Production company: Australian Film Theatre
- Release date: 1985
- Country: Australia
- Language: English

A Single Life is a 1985 Australian film directed by John Power and starring Tina Bursill and Steve Jacobs.

== Plot ==
Single 35-year-old woman, Billie, decides to have a baby, but does not want to be involved with the father of the child.

== Cast ==
- Steve Jacobs as Richard Bennett
- Tina Bursill as Billie Russell
- Jane Clifton as Lee
- Pamela Rabe as Margaret Bennett
- Tony Rickards as Sandy
- Esben Storm as Paul
- Terence Donovan as Chris
- Terry McDermott as Judge
- Sue Jones as Gynaecologist

== Production ==
A Single Life was Melbourne-based writer and director Mark Poole's first feature screenplay. The film was produced by Australian Film Theatre for the BBC and was released in more than 50 territories around the world.

== Accolades ==
The film won an Australian Film Institute Award and earned a Monte Miller Award nomination at the Australian Writers’ Guild Awards (AWGIES). Steve Jacobs also won an award for Best Performance by an Actor in a Leading Role at the 1987 Australian Film Institute Awards.
