= Tea With Madame Clos =

2010 documentary film

Tea with Madame Clos
- Directed by: Jane Oehr
- Written by: Jane Oehr
- Produced by: Jane Oehr
- Starring: Madame Clos
- Cinematography: Jane Oehr
- Edited by: Stewart Young
- Music by: Marcello Maio and Cathy Le Mee
- Release date: 2010
- Running time: 90 minutes
- Country: Australia
- Language: English

Tea with Madame Clos is a 2010 Australian documentary film created by Jane Oehr. It is an observational film looking at the elderly Madame Clos who lives in Lauzerte in France. The film took four years to produce.

George Palathingal of the Sydney Morning Herald gave it 2 stars and says "It is a well edited and handsome film about a lovely, quirky old woman from an old-fashioned French village, but it seems an indulgence." Manly Daily's Rod Bennett calls it a "film with a disjointed narrative that crawls along at a snail's pace." He says "It might be a social/historial experiment, there are subtitles but I loved it and dug myself right in." Writing in the Sun Herald Louise Keller gave it 6/10. She says "Spending time with Madame Clos is an inspiring and charming interlude and one I would have enjoyed more had I not been distracted by the filmmaker's vocal presence."" In the Canberra Times Simon Weaving noted "Oehr herself has admitted to being inspired by Jean-Luc Godard's approach of working instinctively and of letting the story tell itself. Yet with its opening narration, overlaid accordion soundtrack and closing tropes of nostalgia, Oehr reveals a lack of confidence in the pure observational form."

On Radio National's Movietime Julie Rigg says "It's about very ordinary things really: an old woman who has found the way to be happy. I loved it. As I relaxed into it, a frantic, multi-tasking week faded away. It was as refreshing as a weekend in the country." Peter Galvin, reviewing for SBS, says "This is a moving film simply because Oehr was clearly changed by her encounter with Madame Clos, in the same way that a chance meeting or a close encounter with a stranger can lead us to a moment of emotional and spiritual clarity."
