= Big Ideas (film) =

- DVD cover
- Written by: Peter Neale
- Directed by: Mike Smith
- Starring: Justin Rosniak; Gosia Dobrowolska; Harold Hopkins
- Countries of origin: Australia; United Kingdom
- Original language: English

Production
- Producers: Robert Bruning; Adrienne Read
- Running time: 90 mins
- Production company: London Films

Original release
- Release: 1993

Big Ideas is a 1993 TV movie, touted as "From the Producers of Blue Heelers".

== Plot ==
Jimmy Kovak attends a Sydney public (State) school, and is falling behind in his studies, partly because of his love of soccer, and his part-time work producing compost from garbage he collects, and which he sells at a local hardware store.

His next door neighbor has an antipathy to the Kovaks, at least partly because of their nationality, and runs a spiteful campaign against the boy, resulting in confiscation of his compost bins, and other harassment.

His widowed mother is handicapped by her inability to recognize the Latin alphabet (presumably she can read Cyrillic perfectly), and is too embarrassed to seek help, so is forced to accept piece-work, sewing at slave wages. Financial relief comes in the form of Sam Stevens, who recognizes the boy's ingenuity and offers him a contract to invent a chicken feeder. Sam gives Jimmy some valuable lessons in planning and time management.

Jimmy is made aware of oil pollution from a nearby outfall, and with a team of fellow students investigates its source and photographs the culprit in the act. His teacher, Mr. Searle, accepts the report as their Social Studies homework.

His mother grows closer to Sam Stevens, and enrolls in an English reading course.

== Cast ==
- Peter Kowitz as Mr Searle
- Justin Rosniak as Jimmy Kovak
- Troy O'Hearn as Ronnie Dixon
- Salvatore Coco as Ernesto
- Adam Lloyd as Harry
- Mario Gamma as Ben
- Peter Lu as Van
- Paul Chubb as Noel Draper
- Gosia Dobrowolska as Anna Kovak
- Genevieve Lemon as Beth Draper
- Silvio Ofria as Mr. Galea
- Glenda Linscott as Liz Dixon
- Demetra Polycarpou as Maria
- Nicola Lester as Susie Peters
- Bruce Venables as Mr. Hartley
- Harold Hopkins as Sam Stevens
- Xuan Mai as Mr. Tranh
- Anna Hruby as FACS Woman
- William Usic as FACS Man

== DVD ==
Flashback Entertainment has had copies for sale, rated PG (Adult Themes), despite the absence of sex, nudity, violence, gore, profanity, alcohol, drugs, smoking, frightening or intense scenes. The "Adult Themes" are loyalty, the futility of retribution, cooperation, politeness, planning ...
