= Linehaul =

- Written by: Tony Morphett
- Directed by: Frank Arnold
- Starring: Jack Thompson; Peter Gwynne; Keith Lee
- Country of origin: Australia
- Original language: English

Production
- Running time: 100 minutes
- Production company: ABC

Original release
- Network: ABC
- Release: May 1973

Linehaul is a 1973 Australian television film about truckie Dave Morgan. It was a pilot for a series that was never made and an early vehicle for Jack Thompson.

== Cast ==
- Jack Thompson (actor) as Dave Morgan
- Peter Gwynne
- Keith Lee as John Macleod
- Alfred Sandor as Philip Mather
- Bunny Gibson

== Reception ==
The Sydney Morning Herald wrote that "it's probably one of the best written, acted and directed pieces of TV drama to hit the screen this year. The dialogue was taut and economical. The acting, particularly that of Jack Thompson... was first class."
