= Michael Beecher (actor) =

Australian actor

- Michael Beecher as Dr. Brian Denham in TV series The Young Doctors
- Born: Michael Becher; 20 November 1939; Australia
- Died: 4 March 1993 (aged 53); Sydney, New South Wales, Australia
- Occupations: Actor, model

Michael Beecher (20 November 1939 – 4 March 1993) was an Australian-based model and actor. He was the son of Rear Admiral Otto Humphrey Becher and Valerie Chisholme Baird.

Beecher had originally wanted to train and work as a diplomat.

His highest-profile role was as debonair hospital superintendent Dr. Brian Denham in Australian soap opera The Young Doctors, a role he played from the programme's inception in 1976 until leaving the series (shortly before its demise) in 1982. Prior to The Young Doctors he had worked as a photographic model.

== Filmography ==
=== Film ===
Year	Title	Role	Type
1975	Paradise	Faulkner	TV movie
1978	Barnaby and Me	French Reporter	TV movie
1982	Runaway Island		TV movie

=== Television ===
Year	Title	Role	Type
1976	Silent Number		TV series
1976-82	The Young Doctors	Dr. Brian Denham	TV series
1977	The Outsiders		TV series
1977	Bluey	Courier	TV series, 1 episode
1986	The Haunted School	Henry Blackburn	TV miniseries
1987	The Flying Doctors		TV series
