= Golden Pennies =

Australian-British television series

- Written by: Graeme Farmer
- Directed by: Oscar Whitbread
- Starring: Carol Drinkwater; Bryan Marshall
- Countries of origin: Australia; United Kingdom
- Original language: English
- No. of episodes: 10

Original release
- Network: ABC (Australia); ITV (United Kingdom)

Golden Pennies is an Australian-British television series which screened in 1985 on ABC and ITV. The series starred Carol Drinkwater and Bryan Marshall. The ten-part series centres on the Greenwood family as they seek to make their fortune in the Victorian goldfield town of Jericho in the 1850s.

It was executively produced by Christopher Muir, written by Graeme Farmer and directed by Oscar Whitbread.

== Cast ==
- Carol Drinkwater as Rebecca Greenwood
- Bryan Marshall as Luke Greenwood
- Gerard Kennedy as Uriah Lovejoy
- Jason Donovan as Sean
- Frank Wilson as Doc Slope
