= The Dirtwater Dynasty =

1988 miniseries

- Written by: Tony Morphett; Michael Jenkins; John Power; Terry Hayes; John Duigan; Alan Seymour; John Misto
- Directed by: Michael Jenkins; John Power
- Starring: Hugo Weaving; Victoria Longley; Steve Jacobs
- Country of origin: Australia
- Original language: English
- No. of episodes: 5

Production
- Production company: Kennedy Miller

Original release
- Network: Network Ten
- Release: 10 April – 14 April 1988

The Dirtwater Dynasty is a five-part Australian drama miniseries, first screened on Network Ten in 1988. It was directed by Michael Jenkins and John Power.

== Cast ==
=== Starring ===
- Hugo Weaving as Richard Eastwick
- Victoria Longley as Kate Eastwick (née McBride), Nancy Westaway (née Eastwick), Sarah Westaway
- Steve Jacobs as Josh McCall
- Bruce Spence as Lonely Logan
- Dennis Miller as Hasky Tarbox
- Harold Hopkins as Rev. McBride

with

- Jenny Lee as Mrs. McBride
- Kristina Nehm as Esmerelda
- Judy Morris as Frances Eastwick
- Anne-Louise Lambert as Emma Tarbox
- Peter Phelps as David Eastwick
- Scott Burgess as Guy Westaway
- Robert Menzies as Richie Eastwick

=== Co-starring ===
- Ned Manning as David Eastwick II
- Arna-Maria Winchester as Mrs. Tarbox
- Leverne McDonnell as Christine Eastwick
- Ernie Dingo as Billy (Senior)
- Vincent Ball as Eastwick Banker
- Bryan Marshall as Colonel
- Damien Connor as Stockman
- Daryl Dicks as Hughie, Stockman
- John Livingstone as Stockman
- Kristen Mann as Stockman
- Gary Sargeant as Juggler
- Hayden Topperwien as Young Richard Eastwick
- Iain Williams as Stockman #2
- Mouche Phillips as Mary Eastwick
- Betty Lucas as Land Lady
- Tom Oliver as Our Dad
- Bob Baines as Navy Official
- Wendy Strehlow as St. Luke's sister
- Sean Scully as Depression Doctor
- Serge Lazareff as Harvey Purcell
- Richard Meikle as Mr J. James
- Alastair Duncan as Doctor
- Peter Fisher as Nevertire Lands Officer

== Reception ==
The miniseries rated well earning 33 points.

== See also ==
- List of Australian television series
