= Dina Browne =

Australian television personality

Dina Browne (born Dina Heslop) is an Australian television personality, well known as the host of the BTQ7's children's program Dina And Percy.

Browne was raised in South Africa and Swaziland, and attended the University of Natal. She taught in Africa before moving to Australia.

== Theatre and television career ==
She was a founding member of the Australian Community Theatre, which toured South East Queensland in the early 70s. Browne worked as a reporter and "weather girl" for BTQ7.

She was also a contributor to the national This Week Has Seven Days before becoming a producer for later shows like the Logie Award-winning Wombat.

Browne won a Logie Award for Most Popular Female (Queensland) three times – in 1972, 1973, and 1974.

== Later work ==
She was Commissioner on the Queensland Criminal Justice Commission for six years and later a Commissioner for Police Service Reviews. Browne has served on a number of boards and advisory panels including the Board of the Australian Children's Television Foundation as the Queensland Government representative, Queensland Museum Board of Trustees, and was National chairman and a director of The Order of Australia Association. Since 2012, she has worked as a marriage celebrant.

== Awards ==
Browne won a United Nations Media Peace Award in 1989. She was made an Officer in the Order of Australia in 1993 for her services to children's television.
