= Emil Minty =

Australian child actor and jeweller

- Born: 1972 (age 53–54); Sydney, Australia
- Occupations: Actor, Jeweller
- Years active: 1981–1992

Emil Minty (born 1972) is an Australian jeweller and former child actor.

== Career ==
Minty played The Feral Kid, a feral child in the 1981 film Mad Max 2. As an actor, he had no lines in the film. After Mad Max 2, he had minor parts in Fluteman (1982) and in The Winds of Jarrah (1983). In 1990 he appeared in a few episodes of A Country Practice.

== Personal life ==
Minty withdrew from acting when he finished school. He became a jeweller, and has worked at Chris Lewis Jewellers in Sydney's Gladesville since the early 1990s. He is a father of two.

== Filmography ==
- Mad Max 2 (1981) - The Feral Kid
- Fluteman (1982) - Toby
- The Winds of Jarrah (1983) - Andy Marlow
- Captain James Cook (1986) - Young Nick
- The Flying Doctors (1990) - Mat Coulson

== Bibliography ==
- Holmstrom, John. The Moving Picture Boy: An International Encyclopaedia from 1895 to 1995. Norwich, Michael Russell, 1996, p. 394.
