= Fluteman =

The Fluteman
- Directed by: Peter Maxwell
- Written by: Charles Stamp
- Based on: poem The Pied Piper of Hamelin by Robert Browning
- Produced by: Brendon Lunney
- Starring: John Jarratt; John Ewart; Emil Minty; Aileen Britton; Michael Caton
- Cinematography: Phil Pike
- Edited by: Tim Wellburn
- Music by: John Sangster
- Production company: Independent Productions
- Distributed by: CIC-Taft (video)
- Release date: 1982
- Running time: 84 minutes
- Country: Australia
- Language: English

The Fluteman is a 1982 Australian film which retells the Pied Piper of Hamelin.

== Plot ==
The small town of Minyaka (aboriginal word for 'tomorrow') is run by greedy councillors who ignore the needs of the children; having promised them a swimming pool, children’s library and playground but for months the town has been suffering from a great drought. The heat and dust become almost unbearable until one day, during a council meeting, a mysterious and gentle stranger, known only as Fluteman (John Jarratt), offers to make it rain by playing his flute; though under the condition that he be paid $1,000. The councillors mock him and say that they will pay him $5,000 if he can make it rain by sundown of the following day.

All the children believe in him, and for the next day Fluteman plays his flute in different parts of the town; hope is almost lost, until, to the towns surprise and relief, it begins to rain – only it continues to rain nonstop for four more days - then the councillors refuse to pay him until he can make it stop; and so he does. But despite the children’s protest, the councillors still refuse to pay him, spreading doubt into the townsfolk by calling Fluteman a fraud; and that it was merely a coincidence that he happened to play his flute at the right time or maybe that he knew the rain was coming all along.

At that moment, Fluteman stands before the people and tells them that he will put a curse upon the town, a curse that the people would never forget for as long as they live; and as the sun sets Fluteman plays an eerie melody upon a hilltop, and the next morning towns people wake up to find that all the children are missing... except one. A deaf boy called Toby (Emil Minty). But in spite of his affliction Toby tells his school teacher, Sally Cooper (Debra Lawrence), through sign language, that he heard Fluteman and the children; and followed the sound to the hills where he saw coloured lights in a cave. Though many men go in search of the cave but no lights or children could be seen.

Until one night Toby and Sally see lights in Fluteman’s house and so they go see who it is; and it is Fluteman himself, finding that his home and belongings have been wrecked and trashed. Sally begs him to give the children back, but Fluteman tells her it is too late - the town had their chance to do the right thing, but it is only now that the children are gone that their parents miss them - he then asks Toby if he would like to join Fluteman and the other children. Toby knows he would be happy with the children but he also knows it would devastate his mother if she lost him. Sally tries to reason with Fluteman; saying that people make mistakes and the townspeople have learned their lesson. Fluteman agrees to free the children, so long as he gets the $5,000 he was promised.

The councillors calculate that they don’t have an awful lot in the town’s funds but just enough to pay Fluteman, but the money is missing and it turns out the town’s treasurer, Clarence Quint (John Ewart), had stolen the money, in hopes of paying for a long desired holiday in Singapore, and had given it to his stuttering partner, Oswald Snaith (Michael Caton), to keep hidden. The town chases after Snaith in his car, Fluteman and the children arrive just in time to stop him from leaving town; but Snaith swerves around them, as they chase after him, Fluteman plays his flute which causes the car to overheat and break down – causing Snaith to drive into the river.

The councillors get the money back, and as the adults and the children celebrate together, Fluteman is nowhere to be seen; Toby’s mother is talking to Sally saying that Fluteman had given her the $5,000, in hopes that Toby will get the best possible treatment for his hearing.

Sally drives down the road and finds Fluteman; she tries to convince him to stay, and help celebrate in all the happiness he has given to that town but Fluteman declines her invitation. And tells her that he must go wherever he is needed; where ever children need him most.

== Cast ==
- John Jarratt as Fluteman
- John Ewart as Clarence Quint
- Emil Minty as Toby
- Debra Lawrence as Sally Cooper
- Aileen Britton as Beatrice Peachley
- Michael Caton as Oswald Snaith
- Ron Graham as Frank Timms
- Sheila Kennelly as Myra Hansen
- Martin Vaughan as Mr Shaw
- Sarah Lambert as Jane
- Beth Buchanan as Wendy
- Ron Shand as Dicker
- Rosco - Emil's dog companion
