= Billy and Percy =

- Based on: journals of Percy Deane
- Written by: John Power
- Directed by: John Power
- Starring: Martin Vaughan; Harold Hopkins
- Country of origin: Australia
- Original language: English

Production
- Producer: John Power
- Editor: Stewart Young
- Running time: 70 mins
- Production company: Australian Broadcasting Corporation

Original release
- Network: ABC-TV
- Release: 08:50, 6 March 1974 (+11)

Billy and Percy is a 1974 Australian docudrama directed, written and produced by John Power. Created for the Australian Broadcasting Corporation, it is based on the relationship between Prime Minister Billy Hughes and his private secretary Percy Deane during World War I. It was based primarily on Deane's diaries.

== Cast ==
- Martin Vaughan as Billy Hughes
- Harold Hopkins as Percy Deane
- Rosalie Fletcher
- Don Crosby
- Don Reid
- Coralie Neville
- Don Pascoe

== Production ==
Billy and Percy was filmed in parliament buildings in Melbourne, and other locations around Sydney including government offices and outdoor locations.

== Release ==
The film aired on ABC-TV at 08:50 on the 6th of March 1974. It would later be shown at the 1975 Sydney Film Festival and Melbourne International Film Festival.

== Awards ==
- 1974–75 AFI Awards:
  - Best Actor in a Leading Role: Won (Martin Vaughan)
  - Best Direction: Won (John Power)
- 1975 Logie Awards:
  - Best Dramatised Documentary Series: Won
