= Escape from Singapore =

- Written by: John Power
- Directed by: John Power
- Starring: Don Crosby; John Meillon; Martin Vaughan; Peter Gwynne
- Music by: Richard Connolly
- Country of origin: Australia
- Original language: English

Production
- Producer: John Power
- Cinematography: Geoff Burrowes
- Editor: Stewart Young
- Running time: 90 mins
- Production company: ABC

Original release
- Network: ABC
- Release: 26 September 1973 (Sydney)
- Release: 18 October 1973 (Melbourne)

Escape from Singapore is a 1973 Australian TV dramatised documentary about General Gordon Bennett and his escape from Singapore in World War II.

It was a number of dramatised documentaries Power made for Australian TV. He spent ten months researching it, accessing papers provided by Bennett's widow. Power said "I was interested in the dilemma of a man, an undoubtedly a brave man, facing a great personal crisis... should he or should he not leave his troops?.. It goes down as one of the great crises in Australian history."

The film won Best Documentary at the 1974 TV Week Logie Awards.

The show was repeated in 1975.

== Cast ==
- Don Crosby as General Gordon Bennett
- John Meillon as narrator
- Don Philps as Mr Dovey QC
- Martin Vaughan as Boots Callaghan
- Peter Gwynne
- Gordon Glenwright
- Max Osbiston

== Reception ==
The Sun Herald praised it saying "a medal for this one."

The Bulletin said "It deserves a massive audience... smooth, compelling and totally involving. "
