= Cul Cullen =

Australian actor and playwright

- Born: Frederick Charles Cullen c.1934
- Died: December 7, 1982
- Occupations: Actor, writer, cartoonist
- Family: Max Cullen (brother); Adam Cullen (cousin)

Fred Cullen (~1934 – 7 December 1982), credited as Cul Cullen and Fred 'Cul' Cullen, was an Australian writer, actor and cartoonist.

== Career ==
Cullen began his career working as a press artist for Australian Consolidated Press (ACP), at The Telegraph for two years. He also later worked as a press artist on The Sydney Morning Herald.

In the early 1950s, Cullen began illustrating cartoons for The Bulletin, before going on to write and draw 'Oscar Comic' ("The World's Funniest Detective") for Young's Merchandising. During the 1960s, he drew comics for the Kings Cross Whisper and the following decade, created 'Fred the Fisherman' for Fishing News. In 1974, he devised The Adventures of the Jolly Swagman, which was distributed via Ampol service stations.

Cullen's television career began with a two year stint as an art director at ATN, before working for Crawford Productions as a set designer for three years. He then began writing and directing documentaries, before undertaking screenwriting roles for 1976 miniseries Australians at War, series The Outsiders (1976) and classic Australian film The Man from Snowy River (1982). He was also a writer for police procedural series Homicide, including the 1973 episode "The Friendly Fellow", in which he also starred. He won two Logie Awards, for acting and writing, for this episode. He also won several other Logies and a Penguin Award.

Cullen's other acting credits included Over There, The Comedy Game, Snake Gully with Dad and Dave, The Spoiler, Matlock Police, Division 4, Holiday and The Box.

In the mid-1970s, Cullen released an album titled Sometimes through Earth featuring songs and monologues. In the late 1970s, he also made commercials, for brands including Polytex Polyfilla and Berger Paints.

== Personal life ==
Cullen's nickname 'Cul' came from newspaper cartoons he wrote – the smaller ones were signed 'Cul' and the larger ones 'Cullen'.

Cullen had two children – a son and a daughter. His third wife was Jenny Irvine, a journalist. His younger brother Max Cullen (born 1940), is a retired actor. He was also a cousin of Archibald Prize-winning artist Adam Cullen.

== Death ==
Cullen died age 48, on 7 December 1982, at his home in the Colo Valley, north-west of Sydney. His cause of death was a heart attack. He was survived by his wife Jenny and his two children.

== Awards ==
| Year | Title | Award | Category | Result | Ref |
|---|---|---|---|---|---|
| 1974 | Homicide (episode: "The Friendly Fellow") | Logie Awards | Best Script | Won | |
| 1974 | Homicide (episode: "The Friendly Fellow") | Logie Awards | Outstanding Single Acting Performance | Won | |
| 1975 | Homicide (episode: "The Fireworks Man") | Logie Awards | Best Script | Won | |
| 1977 | Australians at War | Logie Awards | Best Documentary Script | Won | |
| 1977 | Australians at War | Penguin Awards | Best Documentary Script | Won | |
