= Martin Vaughan =

Australian actor, musician (1931–2022)

- Vaughan in the miniseries Power Without Glory
- Born: Martin Kevin Vaughan; 5 June 1931; Brisbane, Queensland, Australia
- Died: October 2022 (aged 91)
- Education: University of New South Wales
- Occupations: Actor; musician
- Years active: 1963–2016
- Awards: AACTA Awards Hoyts Prize for Best Performance by an Actor (1975); Logie Award for Most Popular Actor (1977)

Martin Kevin Vaughan (5 June 1931 – October 2022) was an Australian stage, television and film actor and musician. He is best known for appearing in the film Phar Lap as trainer Harry Telford and the lead role in the award-winning 26-part 1976 television miniseries Power Without Glory.

== Biography ==
=== Early life ===
Vaughan was born in Brisbane, Queensland, to a vaudeville comedian father in 1931. Moving to Sydney, New South Wales. at age 17, he was employed in a number of occupations including steam presser, tram conductor, postman, customs clerk and bassoon player. After this he decided to become an actor, and took theatre production and drama classes.

=== Career ===
Vaughan landed his first stage role in 1963 when he was 32.

He moved into television in 1967 and in 1975 won the Hoyts Prize for Best Performance by an Actor at the AFI Awards, for his role of Australian prime minister Billy Hughes in Billy and Percy. This was a tied result with Jack Thompson's role in Sunday Too Far Away. His continuing interest in Billy Hughes led some years later to the revelation that Hughes's daughter Helen had died in childbirth in London; in 2004 he presented an ABC program on the story.

Vaughan's big break came in 1976, when he was chosen to play the lead role of John West in the ABC's 26-part television adaptation of Frank Hardy's novel Power Without Glory. In 1977 he won the Logie Award for Most Popular Actor for this role. He has since appeared in such television programs as The Dismissal (1983 miniseries; as Senator Albert Field), Come In Spinner (1989–90 miniseries), Water Rats, Blue Heelers, All Saints, The Flying Doctors, Heartbreak High, Salem's Lot (2004 miniseries) and headLand. His feature films include Picnic at Hanging Rock (1975), Letters from Poland (1978), We of the Never Never (1982), Phar Lap (1983), The Man Who Sued God (2001) and Australian Rules. He has also appeared in over 60 stage plays.

== Later years ==
Vaughan completed a Bachelor of Arts in Theatre and Film at the age of 63 at the University of New South Wales. He was mainly retired, but occasionally agreed to take part in theatre roles that interested him, such as "Brian" in The Seed.

Vaughan died in October 2022, aged 91.

== Award and nominations ==
Institution	Award	Year	Work/s	Results
AACTA Awards	Hoyts Prize for Performance by an Actor	1975	Billy and Percy as Prime Minister of Australia Billy Hughes	Won
Logie Awards	Silver Logie Award for Most Popular Actor	1977	Power Without Glory	Won
AACTA Awards	Best Actor in a Leading Role	1983	Phar Lap	Nominated
AACTA Awards	Best Actor in a Supporting Role	1983	The Winds of Jarrah	Nominated
Sydney Theatre Awards	Best Supporting Actor	2007	The Seed	Nominated

== Filmography ==
=== Film ===
Title	Year	Role	Type
1973	The Taming of the Shrew	Christopher Sly	TV movie
1974	Between Wars	Dick Turner	Feature film
1974	Escape from Singapore		TV documentary movie
1974	Billy and Percy	Prime Minister of Australia Billy Hughes	TV movie
1975	Picnic at Hanging Rock	Ben Hussey	Feature film
1975	Ride a Wild Pony		Feature film
1975	They Don't Clap Losers	Martin	TV movie
1979	Just Out of Reach	Father	Feature film
1981	Hoodwink	Solicitor	Feature film
1981	A Hard God	Paddy Cassidy	TV movie
1981	Run, Rebecca, Run	Cranky Member	Feature film
1980	Departmental		TV movie
1981	Alison's Birthday	Mr. Martin	Feature film
1982	We of the Never Never	Dan	Feature film
1982	Wilde's Domain	Tom Moore	TV movie
1982	A Shifting Dreaming	A.H. O'Kelly	TV movie documentary
1982	Fluteman	Mr. Shaw	Feature film
1983	The Winds of Jarrah	Ben	Feature film
1983	Phar Lap	Harry Telford	Feature film
1983	The Cattle King		TV movie
1984	Constance	Alexander Eslworth	Feature film
1984	The Schippan Mystery	Detective Edward Priest	TV movie
1987	Great Expectations: The Untold Story	Daniel	Feature film
1988	Danger Down Under	Ginger McDowell	Feature film
1988	Sisterly Love	Bob	TV movie
1989	Kokoda Crescent	Eric	Feature film
1992	The Phantom Horseman		Feature film
1993	You and Me and Uncle Bob	Uncle Bob	Feature film
1993	Encounters	Harris	
1994	Cops and Robbers		Feature film
2000	The Magic Pudding	Parrot (voice)	Animated feature film
2001	The Man Who Sued God	Co-plaintiff	Feature film
2002	Australian Rules	Darcy	Feature film

=== Television ===
Title	Year	Role	Type
1967	Hunter	Agent #4	TV series
1971	Spyforce	Sergeant Wills	TV series
1971	The Comedy Game		TV series
1973	Boney	Paroo Bikeman	TV series
1973	Seven Little Australians	Pat	TV miniseiries
1974	Silent Number	Winslow	TV series
1974	Division 4	Charlie Hill	TV series
1975	Processed Process		
1965-76	Homicide	Archie Prouse / George Armstrong / Snatcher Bennett / Paul Matthews	TV series
1974-76	Matlock Police	Various roles	TV series
1976	Luke's Kingdom	Connelly	TV miniseries
1976	Power Without Glory	John West	TV miniseries
1978	Glenview High		TV series
1978	Chopper Squad	Ferry Captain	TV series
1979	Skyways	Charlie Day	TV series
1979	Doctor Down Under	Wardsman	TV series
1980	Cop Shop	Albie Reid	TV series
1981	Bellamy	Hill	TV miniseries
1982	1915	Hugh McKenzie	TV miniseries
1983	The Dismissal	Albert Field	TV miniseries
1984	Sweet and Sour	Shrug Yates	TV series
1984	Special Squad	Ben Alexander	TV series
1982-85	A Country Practice	Various roles	TV series
1986	A Fortunate Life	Frank Phillips	TV miniseries
1986	Return to Eden	Dr. Bennett	TV series
1986	Alice to Nowhere	Jack "The Dogger" Harris	TV miniseries
1987-88	Willing and Abel	"Just One" Moore	TV series
1984-88	Mother and Son	Dr. Holloway	TV series
1988	Australians	Ced Fitzgerald / Mr. Jackson	TV miniseries
1987-88	Rafferty's Rules	2 roles	TV series
1989	In Sickness and Health	The Priest	TV series
1990	Come in Spinner	Blue	TV miniseries
1986-90	The Flying Doctors	3 roles	TV series
1990	Howard the Mild Colonial Boy	Constable Cliche	TV series
1991	Deadly	Doctor Ward	
1995	G.P.	Charles Restegina	TV series
1995	On the Dead Side		
1997	Water Rats	Vic Roland	TV series
1997	Heartbreak High	Harold	TV series
1997	Emmerdale: The Dingles Down Under	Crocodile Dingle	
1998-00	Search for Treasure Island	Jones	TV series
1999	Murder Call	Walter Hart	TV series
1999	The Missing	Father John	
2000	Bondi Banquet	Hal Trembath	TV series
2000	Tales of the South Seas		TV miniseries
2001	Head Start	Cullen Ashton	TV series
2002	Blue Heelers	Roy Haiseman	TV series
2003	Grass Roots	Lex Fisher	TV series
2004	Salem's Lot	Ed "Weasel" Craig	TV miniseries
2005-06	headLand	Curly	TV series
2006	Nightmares and Dreamscapes	Dr. Kazallan	TV anthology series
1998-06	All Saints		TV series
2008	H2O: Just Add Water	Max Hamilton	TV series
2010	Cops L.A.C.	Tim	TV series
2013	Crownies	Alfred McMahon	TV series
2010-14	Rake	2 roles	TV series
