= The Winds of Jarrah =

- Directed by: Mark Egerton
- Written by: Mark Egerton; Bob Ellis; Anne Brooksbank
- Based on: novel The House in the Timberwoods (1959) by Joyce Dingwell
- Starring: Susan Lyons; Terence Donovan
- Release date: 1983
- Country: Australia
- Language: English
- Budget: A$2.5 million

The Winds of Jarrah is a 1983 Australian film adapted from a Mills & Boon novel. It was never released to cinemas.

== Cast ==
- Susan Lyons as Diana Venness
- Terence Donovan as Timber Marlow
- Harold Hopkins as Jack Farrell
- Steve Bisley as Clem Mathieson
- Martin Vaughan as Ben
- Les Foxcroft as Woody Gunner
- Michael Long as Paul Marlow
- Steve Bisley as Clem Mathieson

== Production ==
The film was financed in part by the Australian Film Commission and the Film Corporation of Western Australia.

Screenwriter Bob Ellis later called it a "shocking film.. which, would you believe, started out as a very good script and only about one sentence of it survived."
