= Son of Inspector Champion =

1940 Australian radio serial

Son of Inspector Champion is a 1940 Australian radio serial by Claire Meillon set in bushranging days.

The serial started August 1940 and ran for three episodes a week. It was based on a 1938 serial by Meillion.

Meillon wrote a large number of adventure serials for the ABC.

The serial was popular and was recorded again in 1944.
