= Emerald Hill Theatre =

Defunct Australian theatre

The Emerald Hill Theatre was a theatre company and venue in Melbourne, Australia, which operated from 1962 to 1966. The 140-seat Emerald Hill Theatre was at 250 Dorcas St, South Melbourne, in a former church converted by architect Robin Boyd.

It was established by director Wal Cherry and actor, writer/director George Whaley. Cherry described it being inspired by three characteristics appearing in Australian arts at the time: "dissatisfaction with the pose of the Artist as Garret Dweller, impractical and effete; a desire to break through the elite circle which surrounds the arts into a more popular culture; [and] a definite need to bring the arts closer together in order to put pressure on the community".
