= John Power (director) =

- Born: John Beresford Power; 20 November 1930; Maitlan, New South Wales, Australia
- Died: February 2016 (aged 85)
- Occupations: Film director; journalist; television director
- Family: Dave Power (brother)

John Beresford Power (20 November 1930 – February 2016) was an Australian film and television director, who began his career as a journalist.

== Early life and journalism career ==
Power was born in Maitland, New South Wales. His older brother was Dave Power, a long-distance runner who won medals at the Olympics and Commonwealth Games. After leaving school, he joined the Maitland Mercury as a cadet journalist, later moving to Sydney to work for The Daily Telegraph and The Daily Mirror. He was a political journalist in Canberra at the time of the Australian Labor Party split of 1955, events which he would later cover in the documentary film Like a Summer Storm.

== Awards ==
Power won the AFI Award for Best Direction for the 1974 TV docudrama Billy and Percy.

== Select filmography ==
- The Other Side of Innocence (1972) (documentary) - director
- Like a Summer Storm (1972) (TV movie) - director, writer, producer
- What did you do at school today? (1974) (documentary short) - director
- Escape from Singapore (1974) (TV movie) - director, writer, producer
- Billy and Percy (1974) (TV movie) - director, writer, producer
- They Don't Clap Losers (1975) (TV movie) - director, writer, producer
- The Picture Show Man (1977) - director
- The Sound of Love (1978) (TV movie) - director, writer
- A Single Life (1986) (TV movie)
- The Dismissal (1983) (TV miniseries) - director
- The Great Gold Swindle (1984) - director
- Special Squad (1984) (TV Series) - director
- Return to Eden (1986) (TV series) - director
- A Single Life (1986) - director, writer
- Alice to Nowhere (1986) (TV miniseries) - director
- Willing and Abel (1987) (TV series) - director
- Mike Willesee's Australians (1988) (TV series) - director episode "Clyde Fenton"
- The Dirtwater Dynasty (1988) (TV miniseries) - director
- Tanamera - Lion of Singapore (1989) (TV miniseries) - director
- Father (1990) - director
- Sky Trackers (1990) (TV movie) - director
- All the Rivers Run 2 (1990) (TV miniseries) - director
- Charles and Diana: Unhappily Ever After (1992) (TV movie) - director
- The Tommyknockers (1993) (TV miniseries) - director
- Someone Else's Child (1994) (TV movie) - director
- Betrayed by Love (1994) (TV movie) - director
- Fatal Vows: The Alexandra O'Hara Story (1994) (TV movie) - director
- A Child is Missing (1995) (TV movie) - director
- Heart of Fire (1997) (TV movie) - director
- Goldrush: A Real Life Alaskan Adventure (1998) (TV movie) - director
