= A Phoenix Too Frequent =

1946 stage play by Christopher Fry

Cover design by Ronald Searle for 1959 edition of the published play

A Phoenix Too Frequent is a one-act stage comedy in blank verse by Christopher Fry, originally produced at the Mercury Theatre, London in 1946. It has been adapted for television numerous times, in Britain and other countries, but has been less frequently revived in the theatre.

The play depicts a grieving widow in Ancient Greece gradually finding the attractions of a young soldier outweighing her determination to join her husband in the underworld.

== Background and first production ==
The Mercury Theatre, in Notting Hill Gate, London, was opened by Ashley Dukes in 1933. Part of its brief was to present new, experimental drama, and before the Second World War plays by T. S. Eliot, W. H. Auden, Christopher Isherwood and others were presented there. After the war the Mercury continued to present new plays. In April 1946 the theatre staged a double bill, comprising the first British performance of The Resurrection by W. B. Yeats and the world premiere of Fry's A Phoenix Too Frequent. Both works have small casts: four performers in the first and three in the second.

Fry took as his inspiration Jeremy Taylor's retelling of a tale from Petronius. He took the title from Robert Burton's translation of lines from an epigram of Martial, lamenting his lost love, in comparison with whom "a peacock's undecent, a squirrel's harsh, a phoenix too frequent". (Note: Cui comparatus indecens erit pavo/Inamabilis sciurus, et frequens Phoenix: referring to the poet's lost love, compared to whom, in a more modern English version than Burton's, "the peacock was ugly, the squirrel unattractive, the phoenix a common object".)

=== Original cast ===
- Dynamene – Hermione Hannen
- Doto – Eleanor Summerfield
- Tegeus – Alan Wheatley

The play was directed by E. Martin Browne.

== Plot ==
The scene is the tomb of the recently dead Virilius, near Ephesus. Dynamene, the grieving widow, has determined to remain in the tomb until she can join Virilius in the underworld. The play opens with the first night of gloomy fast and broken sleep, disturbed at 2 a.m. by Tegeus, a soldier. He has been put on guard over the bodies of six criminals hanged nearby. He is drawn by the light in the tomb and enters. Dynamene, encouraged by her maidservant Doto, gradually finds Tegeus so attractive that she opts for life with him rather than death with Virilius.

They discover that in Tegeus's absence from his post one of the dead bodies has been cut down; this neglect of his duties renders Tegeus liable to court martial. He decides to kill himself rather than face the disgrace. Dynamene suggests that they substitute the body of Virilius. Tegeus is appalled, but she persuades him:

How little you can understand! I loved
His life not his death. And now we can give his death
The power of life. Not horrible: wonderful!

Dynamene, Tegeus and Doto drink a toast to the memory of Virilius as the play ends.

== Revivals and adaptations ==
=== Revivals ===
A Phoenix Too Frequent was revived at the Arts Theatre, London on 20 November 1946. Hannen again played Dynamene, Joan White played Doto and Paul Scofield played Tegeus. The director was Noel Willman. The production ran for 64 performances. A production directed by John Crockett toured Britain in 1950 and 1951, presenting the play in a double bill with Chekhov's farce The Proposal.

The play was staged at the Fulton Theatre, Broadway on 26 April 1950, and closed after five performances. Nina Foch played Dynamene, Richard Derr Tegeus and Vicki Cummings Doto. According to Emil Roy in a 1968 study of Fry, the early withdrawal of the piece was "largely because of faulty acting" and being coupled in a double bill with an unsuitable companion piece. A later American production was staged by Writers Theatre in 2001, directed by Michael W. Halberstam with Karen Janes Woditsch as Dynamene, Sean Fortunato as Tegeus and Maggie Carney as Doto. A planned 2020 production by American Players Theatre was postponed because of the COVID-19 pandemic.

=== Television adaptations ===
The first television broadcast was in June 1946 on BBC Television, based on the original Mercury stage production, featuring Hannen, Summerfield and Wheatley. There were further BBC television versions in 1951, featuring Jessie Evans, Diana Graves and John Justin, 1955, featuring George Cole, Jessie Evans and Noelle Middleton, and 1972, featuring Lynn Farleigh as Dynamene, William Gaunt as Tegeus and Julia Sutton as Doto.

In 1955 a version was broadcast on West German television. The cast consisted of Sigrid Marquardt, Käte Jaenicke and Günther König. The following year, a production was broadcast on Danish television.

A version aired in 1957 on Australian television, on the ABC at a time when Australian drama production was rare. Produced by Paul O'Loughlin, it aired live in Sydney on 24 July 1957, and a recording was later broadcast in Melbourne. The cast consisted of Dinah Shearing as Dynamene, James Condon as Tegeus and Audrey Teesdale as Doto.

Between 1959 and 1966, adaptations were transmitted by television stations in Switzerland (1959, featuring Ingeborg Luescher, Beatrice Schweizer and Wolfgang Schwarz), Finland (1960), West Germany (1963, featuring Dinah Hinz, Charles Brauer and Angelika Hurwicz), Austria (1966, with Christiane Hörbiger, Carla Hagen and Walter Reyer), and Australia (1966, featuring Lynette Curran as Dynamene, Sean Scully as Tegeus and Fay Kelton as Doto, directed by Oscar Whitbread).

=== Radio adaptations ===
The BBC broadcast adaptations in 1947, featuring the original Mercury cast, and in 1976, featuring Sarah Badel, Gawn Grainger and Patsy Rowlands.

== Notes, references and sources ==
=== Sources ===
- Bohn, Henry George (1879). The Epigrams of Martial. London: George Bell. OCLC 1066784490.
- Burton, Robert (1896). The Anatomy of Melancholy. London: George Bell. OCLC 1045358133.
- Fry, Christopher (1951). A Phoenix Too Frequent. London and New York: Oxford University Press. OCLC 1036767916.
- Roy, Emile (1968). Christopher Fry. Carbondale: Southern Illinois University Press. OCLC 1029262310.
