= Sean Scully (actor) =

Australian actor (born 1947)

- Born: 28 September 1947 (age 79); Sydney, New South Wales, Australia
- Education: Arts Educational School
- Occupation: Actor
- Years active: 1958–2018
- Spouse: Wendy Hughes (m. 1971; div. 1973)
- Mother: Margaret Christensen

Sean Scully (born 28 September 1947) is an Australian actor and singer, active in film, television and theatre, who has also worked abroad in the United Kingdom and the United States.

== Early life ==
Scully was born in Sydney, New South Wales, the son of actress and radio host Margaret Christensen and Vern Scully, a violinist with the Sydney Symphony Orchestra.

== Career ==
Scully began his acting career in the Cinerama South Seas Adventure, after which he relocated from Australia to London in 1959, at age 11, with his mother.

Once in the UK, he initially attended Claremont Fan Court School, a Christian Scientist school in Surrey, followed by a school in Buckingham Gate. He then moved on to attend Arts Educational Schools, in London. Scully was signed to an agent and within the month he landed the lead role in children's series Mill of Secrets in 1960.

He starred in 1960 Children's Film Foundation film Hunted in Holland, which won the Diploma of Honour at the Cannes Film Festival. A TV play called The Boy with the Telephone (1960) was written specially for him. Following that, he was signed by Walt Disney Management and starred in a number of Technicolor family feature films for the studio, including The Prince and the Pauper (1962), in which he played both title characters, alongside Guy Williams, as Miles Hendon. Scully starred as Peter in the 1962 Disney movie Almost Angels, (retitled Born to Sing in the UK), and appeared as young John Banks, opposite Patrick McGoohan in Dr. Syn, Alias the Scarecrow (1963).

Scully was cast opposite Spike Milligan and John Woodvine as Jim Hawkins in a production of Treasure Island at the Mermaid Theatre in London.

On Broadway, he starred as King Nicholas III in The Girl Who Came to Supper, Noël Coward's musical version of Terence Rattigan's 1953 play, The Sleeping Prince from 1963 to 1964. winning him a Charlotte Cushman Award.

On his return to the UK in 1964, Scully found it increasingly difficult to land acting work, so he worked in a timber yard, before returning to Australia in 1965, at the age of 18. He appeared in television plays including A Phoenix Too Frequent (1966), Serjeant Musgrave's Dance (1967) and as Romeo in Romeo and Juliet (1967), all while playing Ron Wilson in TV soap opera Bellbird for two years. His character was temporarily written out due to his stage commitments, including a production of Forty Carats, in which he played the juvenile lead. He appeared in numerous plays throughout his career, including many for the Melbourne Theatre Company. He toured nationally in Butterflies are Free in 1971, together with Wendy Hughes.

Scully's more substantial television roles include starring as Eddie Corrigan in the 1976 miniseries Power Without Glory, based on the historical novel by Frank Hardy. In 1978, he played the recurring role of Sam Kendall in wartime drama The Sullivans. In 1982, he appeared as wealthy French aristocrat Louis de Bourget in the romantic period drama miniseries Sara Dane. From 1984 to 1985, he played Jim O'Brien in the soap opera Sons and Daughters. and the following year he played Dan Moulton in Prisoner. He starred as Ian Cochrane in crime drama series Phoenix from 1992 to 1993. Throughout 1995, he played the regular role of Neville Loman in short-lived soap opera Echo Point, alongside Rose Byrne and Martin Henderson.

He has had recurring guest roles in Matlock Police, Division 4, E Street, Medivac, Neighbours, Blue Heelers and Stingers. Other television credits include Homicide, Cop Shop, The Restless Years, The Flying Doctors, A Country Practice, Police Rescue, G.P., State Coroner and The Doctor Blake Mysteries.

Scully's film credits include A City's Child (1971), Australian New Wave film Sunday Too Far Away (1975) with Jack Thompson, Eliza Fraser (1976), Heaven Tonight (1989) alongside Guy Pearce, Turtle Beach (1992) opposite Greta Scacchi and Shotgun Wedding (1993) with Aden Young. In 1988, he starred in the cult film Phobia, earning him an Australian Film Institute Awards nomination for Best Actor that year.

Scully has also featured in radio, playing Steven Rossiter in long running radio show Blue Hills from 1974.

== Personal life ==
Scully met actress Wendy Hughes when they were touring the stage show Butterflies are Free around Australia. They lived together for two years before getting married in 1971, but were divorced by 1973. Scully cited their young age as the reason. After their divorce, the pair remained friends until Hughes' death from cancer in 2014.

Scully also dated English actress Jane Asher, after having previously appeared with her in a production of The Prince and the Pauper.

Scully was best man at Be Our Guest co-star Jacki Weaver's wedding to series director David Price in Sydney in 1966.

== Filmography ==
=== Film ===
Year	Title	Role	Notes
1958	South Seas Adventure		Documentary film series
1960	Hunted in Holland	Tim	TV play
1962	The Prince and the Pauper	Prince Edward / Tom Canty	Feature film
1962	Almost Angels (aka Born to Sing)	Peter Schaefer	Feature film
1963	The Scarecrow of Romney Marsh	John Banks / Curlew	Feature film
1972	A City's Child	The Man	Feature film
1975	Sunday Too Far Away	Beresford	Feature film
1976	Eliza Fraser	Elliott	Feature film
1976	High Rolling	Policeman	Feature film
1986	Cactus	Doctor	Feature film
1986	Departure	Bowen	Feature film
1988	Phobia	David Simmonds	Feature film
1988	Kadaicha (aka Stones of Death)	Mr Fitzgerald	Feature film
1989	Daisy and Simon (aka Where the Outback Ends)	Simon	Feature film
1990	Heaven Tonight	Tim Robbins	Feature film
1992	Turtle Beach (aka The Killing Beach)	Businessman #1	Feature film
1993	Shotgun Wedding	Detective Craig Haker	Feature film
1995	Frailejón	Father's voice	Short film
2007	Missive	Walter Boyle	Short film
2007	Two Door Mansion	Robert Brouwer	Feature film

=== Television ===
Year	Title	Role	Notes
1960	Mill of Secrets	Claude 'Snow' Nolan	6 episodes
1960	Theatre 70	Peter Jerrard	Episode: "Boy on the Telephone"
1964	The Sullavan Brothers	Alan Brown	1 episode
1965	ITV Play of the Week	Barnes	Episode: "Goodbye Johnny"
1966	A Phoenix Too Frequent	Tegeus	TV movie (as part of Wednesday Theatre)
1966	Be Our Guest	Cousin Sean	
1967	Love and War	Romeo	2 episodes: "Serjeant Musgrave's Dance", "Romeo and Juliet"
1967–1976	Homicide	James Reynolds / Graham Turner / Rod Pearson / Gordon Harvey / John Barrett	5 episodes
1968–1971	Bellbird	Ron Wilson	353 episodes
1969	Riptide	Chuck	1 episode
1970–1975	Division 4	Charles Simpson / Patrick 'Snatch' O'Donnell / Michael Cowan	3 episodes
1972–1975	Matlock Police	Richard Creely / Eddie Harris / Barry Reid	3 episodes
1973	Solomon	Rev. Mark Solomon	TV movie
1974	Three Men of the City	Keith Langdon	Miniseries, 2 episodes
1974	Silent Number	Paul	1 episode
1975	They Don't Clap Losers	Sandy	TV movie
1976	Tandarra	Smolly	Miniseries, 1 episode
1976	Power Without Glory	Eddie Corrigan	Miniseries, 10 episodes
1977	Trial of Ned Kelly		TV movie
1978	Against the Wind	John Macarthur	Miniseries, 1 episode
1978	The Sullivans	Sam Kendall	20 episodes
1978–1983	Cop Shop	Steve Mercer / Alan Wilson / Wayne Preston / Rip Valenti	7 episodes
1979	Chopper Squad	Ed	1 episode
1980	Water Under the Bridge	Pete Atkins	Miniseries, 1 episode
1981	Bellamy	Derelict	Miniseries, 1 episode
1982	Deadline	Army Officer	TV movie
1982	Sara Dane	Louis de Bourget	Miniseries, 8 episodes
1982; 1987	A Country Practice	Cliff Hayden / Ken Harper	4 episodes
1983	The Dismissal	Doug Anthony	Miniseries, 3 episodes
1984	Special Squad	Leo Teller / Kevin O'Neil	2 episodes
1984–1985	Sons and Daughters	Jim O'Brien	60 episodes
1986	Prisoner	Dan Moulton	27 episodes
1986	The Flying Doctors	Barry Irving	1 episode
1986	Shark's Paradise	Detective Charlie Kelly	TV movie
1987	Black Beauty		Animated TV movie
1988	The Dirtwater Dynasty	Depression Doctor	Miniseries, 1 episode
1988	Joe Wilson	Henry Lawson	Miniseries, 1 episode
1988	Takeover	Enzo	TV movie
1989	E Street	Mike Kominski	8 episodes
1991	Police Rescue	Michael	1 episode
1992	G.P.	Dr. A	1 episode
1992–1993	Phoenix	Ian 'Goose' Cochrane	26 episodes
1994	Time Trax	Albert Logan	1 episode
1994	A Country Practice	Keith Jacobs	1 episode
1995	Fire	Dr. David Crown	2 episodes
1995	Kansas	Alan Radford	TV movie
1995	Echo Point	Neville Loman	130 episodes
1996	Pacific Drive	Vince Marshall	
1997–1998	Medivac	Monsignor Jack Duval	3 episodes
1998	State Coroner	Father Frank Driscoll	1 episode
1998–2000	Blue Heelers	Doug Healy	4 episodes
2000	Neighbours	Bernie Samuels	6 episodes
2001	Horace and Tina	Mr Reid	2 episodes
2001	Something in the Air	Paddy	2 episodes
2001	Stingers	Assistant Commissioner Jim Courtney	3 episodes
2003	Evil Never Dies	Suit #2	TV movie
2010	C.A.	Maffieux #3	2 episodes
2017	The Doctor Blake Mysteries	Lloyd Wellman	1 episode

== Theatre ==
Year	Title	Role	Notes
1961	Treasure Island	Jim Hawkins	Mermaid Theatre, London
1963–1964	The Girl Who Came to Supper	King Nicholas III	Broadway, New York
1965	Candida	Eugene Marchbanks	Birmingham Repertory Theatre & Europe tour
1966	Chips with Everything		Independent Theatre, Sydney
1967	The Lion in Winter	John	Independent Theatre, Sydney
1968	The Absence of a Cello	Perry Littlewood	St Martins Theatre, Melbourne
1968	Twelfth Night		University of Melbourne with MTC
1968	Burke's Company	King	Russell St Theatre, Melbourne, with MTC
1969	Henry IV, Part 1	Prince John of Lancaster	Octagon Theatre, Perth, Keith Murdoch Court, Melbourne with MTC
1969	The Country Wife	Mr. Dorilant	Russell St Theatre, Melbourne, Canberra Theatre with MTC
1969	A Long View		Russell St Theatre, Melbourne with MTC
1969	Six Characters in Search of an Author		Russell St Theatre, Melbourne with MTC
1969	The Unknown Soldier and His Wife		Russell St Theatre, Melbourne with MTC
1970	Forty Carats	Peter Latham	Melbourne Athenaeum
1970	The Prince and the Firebird	Prince Ivan	UNSW Old Tote Theatre, Sydney
1971	Butterflies are Free	Don Baker	Australian tour with J. C. Williamson's & Harry M. Miller
1972	The Old Familiar Juice		Russell St Theatre, Melbourne, with MTC
1972	Sticks and Bones	David	Russell St Theatre, Melbourne, with MTC
1972	The Tavern		Russell St Theatre, Melbourne, with MTC
1972–1973	Jugglers Three	Graham	Russell St Theatre, Melbourne, Playbox Theatre, Melbourne with MTC
1972–1973	Tom		Russell St Theatre, Melbourne, with MTC
1973	Mother Courage	Soldier	Princess Theatre, Melbourne with MTC
1973	Batman's Beach-Head		Comedy Theatre, Melbourne with MTC & J. C. Williamson's
1975	Scapino		Comedy Theatre, Melbourne, Elizabethan Theatre, Sydney with J. C. Williamson's
1975	The Touch of Silk		Independent Theatre, Sydney
1977	The Mind with the Dirty Man	Clayton Stone	Metro Theatre, Sydney with CKC Theatres
1979	Smiles and Piles	Actor / singer	Kirribilli Pub Theatre, Sydney
1979	Makassar Reef	Weeks Brown	Nimrod St Theatre, Sydney
1979	Marsupials	Tom	Russell St Theatre, Melbourne, with MTC
1980	Errol Flynn's Great Big Adventure Book for Boys	Errol Flynn	Nimrod St Theatre, Sydney, with King O'Malley Theatre Company
1984	The Mating Game		Bankstown Town Hall, Sydney
1984	The Odd Couple	Speed	Her Majesty's Theatre, Melbourne
1987	Down an Alley Filled with Cats		Q Theatre, Penrith
1989	Passion Play	James	Sydney Opera House with Gary Penny Productions
1989	Karamazov		Crossroads Theatre, Sydney with Thalia Theatre Company
1990	Observe the Sons of Ulster Marching Towards the Somme	Kenneth Pyper (young)	Crossroads Theatre, Sydney with O'Punksky's
1991	The Norman Conquests	Norman	Ensemble Theatre, Sydney
1992	A Stretch of the Imagination	Monk O'Neill	Playhouse, Newcastle with Hunter Valley Theatre Company
1994	The Fire Raisers		Crossroads Theatre, Sydney
1994	Falling from Grace	Dr Hugh Storey	Australian tour with STC, Playbox Theatre Company & QTC
1996	Coralie Lansdowne Says No	Peter	Stables Theatre, Sydney with Griffin Theatre Company
2015	The Process	Gottlieb Shortstraw / Sly Moribund	La Mama, Melbourne, Acton St Theatre, Canberra
2018	The Odyssey: Part Four – The Homecoming	Reading	MPavilion, Melbourne

== Awards ==
Year	Work	Award	Category	Result
	The Girl Who Came to Supper	Charlotte Cushman Award		Won
1988	Phobia	Australian Film Institute Award	Best Actor	Nominated
