= Formula for Danger =

1960 British children's television serial

- Written by: Vivian Milroy
- Directed by: Cecil Petty
- Starring: Joseph Cuby; David Langford; Janet Bradbury
- Country of origin: United Kingdom
- Original language: English
- No. of series: 1
- No. of episodes: 7

Production
- Producer: Cecil Petty
- Running time: 25 minutes
- Production company: ATV

Original release
- Network: ITV
- Release: 6 March – 17 April 1960

Formula for Danger is a 1960 British children's television serial created by ATV for ITV

== Plot ==
Erik Stahl, the son of a scientist has escaped the European country of Ostonia with a secret formula created by his father, Formula 987. After arriving in England and with foreign agents after him, Erik takes refuge at a London secondary modern school where he makes friends with students, Roger and Pat. In the school lab, the kids try out the formula to the amazement of their science teacher, Mr Winston. The experiment gains the attention of Mr Peterson, a ruthless businessman and soon the press hears of the formula as well. Now Erik faces a moral dilemma, his father had told him that if the discovery was likely to be used for evil then he must destroy it.

== Cast ==
- Joseph Cuby as Erik Stahl
- David Langford as Roger Gale
- Janet Bradbury as Pat
- Gene Anderson as Nina Sjapary
- Kenneth Watson as Mr Winston
- John Abineri as Malovicz
- John Adan as Jonah
- Malcolm Ranson as Titch
- Irene Sutcliffe as Mary Stahl
- John Carson as Landauer

David Langford, Janet Bradbury, Gene Anderson and Kenneth Watson received so much fan mail that ATV brought them back for another children's serial, Mill of Secrets.

== Production ==
Programme consultant, Mary Field reportedly said in the TVTimes.

Of course we must have a good story, but that is no reason why we can't also put over a message. In this case it's a simple argument that science must be above politics and personal gain. The inventor has a right to stand up against politicians and big business.

Producer and director Cecil Petty hired technical experts from the Regetn Street Polytechnic in London for setting up test tubes, pipes and retorts for the experiment scene. Script writer Vivian Milroy created the language of Ostonia, Ostonian using a mixture of German, Russian and Norwegian and even went so far as to produce a glossary of basic Ostonian terms.

== Episodes ==
| Episode No. | Episode Title | Original Broadcast Date |
|---|---|---|
| 1 | "A Red Dawn Tomorrow" | 6 March 1960 |
| 2 | "The Ostonian Lecture" | 13 March 1960 |
| 3 | "An Interview with the Press" | 20 March 1960 |
| 4 | "Big Business and Shady Business" | 27 March 1960 |
| 5 | "A Face at the Window" | 3 April 1960 |
| 6 | "Pat the Accuser" | 10 April 1960 |
| 7 | "An Experiment with Danger | 17 April 1960 |

== Availability ==
The serial exists in its entirety but has never been released on home media.
