= The Girl Who Came to Supper =

1963 musical

- Original Cast Recording
- Music: Noël Coward
- Lyrics: Noël Coward
- Book: Harry Kurnitz
- Basis: Terence Rattigan's play The Sleeping Prince
- Productions: 1963 Broadway

The Girl Who Came to Supper is a musical with a book by Harry Kurnitz and music and lyrics by Noël Coward, based on Terence Rattigan's 1953 play The Sleeping Prince. The musical premiered on Broadway in 1963.

== Plot ==
The story is set in 1911 London at the time of George V's coronation. American-born chorus girl Mary Morgan becomes involved with Balkan archduke Charles, the widowed prince regent of Carpathia, after he sees a performance of her West End musical The Coconut Girl. She soon becomes involved with the actions of his teenaged son, King Nicholas, as well as the Queen Mother.

== Production ==
Rattigan's play had been staged in London with Laurence Olivier and Vivien Leigh, on Broadway with Michael Redgrave and Barbara Bel Geddes, and filmed as The Prince and the Showgirl with Olivier and Marilyn Monroe, so its story was a fairly familiar one. The musical opened to rave reviews in Boston but was received less favorably by the critics in Toronto. During its Philadelphia run, President Kennedy was assassinated, necessitating the replacement of the opening number, "Long Live the King (If He Can)".

The musical opened on Broadway, directed and choreographed by Joe Layton, on December 8, 1963 at The Broadway Theatre, where it ran for 112 performances and four previews. The cast featured Florence Henderson as Mary, José Ferrer as Charles, Irene Browne as the Queen Mother, Sean Scully as Nicholas, British music hall star Tessie O'Shea as Ada Cockle, and Roderick Cook as Peter Northbrook.

Henderson and O'Shea were singled out for praise by the critics — Henderson for her one-woman delivery of an abridged version of The Coconut Girl, and O'Shea for her extended song-and-dance routine of Cockney tunes. Otherwise, the review by the influential critic Walter Kerr in the Herald Tribune was mostly negative. He and others felt the show was an unsuccessful attempt to duplicate the success of the earlier My Fair Lady.

O'Shea won the Tony Award for Best Featured Actress in a Musical. Nominations also went to Coward and Kurnitz for Best Author of a Musical and Irene Sharaff for Best Costume Design.

The show proved to be the last with a Coward score and the only one of his musicals never produced in London.

An original cast recording was released on the Columbia Records label. (Reissue: Sony Broadway SK 48210).

== Song list ==
Act I

- Swing Song
- Yasni Kozkolai (Carpathian National Anthem)
- My Family Tree
- I've Been Invited to a Party
- Waltz
- I've Been Invited to a Party (Reprise)
- When Foreign Princes Come to Visit Us
- Sir or Ma'am
- Soliloquies
- Lonely
- London is a Little Bit of All Right
- What Ho, Mrs. Brisket
- Don't Take Our Charlie for the Army
- Saturday Night at the Rose and Crown
- London Is a Little Bit of All Right (Reprise)
- Here and Now
- I've Been Invited to a Party (Reprise)
- Soliloquies (Reprise)

Act II

- Coronation Chorale
- How Do You Do, Middle Age?
- Here and Now (Reprise)
- The Stingaree
- Curt, Clear and Concise
- Tango
- Welcome to Pootzie Van Doyle
- The Coconut Girl
- Paddy MacNeill and His Automobile
- Swing Song (Reprise)
- Six Lillies of the Valley
- The Walla Walla Boola
- This Time It's True Love
- I'll Remember Her

== Awards and nominations ==
=== Original Broadway production ===
Year	Award	Category	Nominee	Result
1964	Tony Award	Best Author	Noël Coward and Harry Kurnitz	Nominated
1964	Tony Award	Best Performance by a Featured Actress in a Musical	Tessie O'Shea	Won
1964	Tony Award	Best Costume Design	Irene Sharaff	Nominated
