= The Inside Man (1969 TV series) =

1969 British television series

The Inside Man is a British television series that was shown in twelve one-hour episodes in 1969. The mystery drama series, produced by London Weekend Television starred Frederick Jaeger as criminologist Dr. James Austen.
