= Pretenders (TV series) =

- Starring: Frederick Jaeger
- Country of origin: United Kingdom
- Original languages: English, German, Welsh
- No. of series: 1
- No. of episodes: 13

Production
- Producers: Patrick Dromgoole; Leonard White
- Production company: HTV

Original release
- Network: ITV
- Release: 27 February – 21 May 1972

Pretenders is a thirteen-episode British historical adventure television series produced by Harlech Television (HTV) and broadcast from 27 February to 21 May 1972 on ITV. It was filmed in Somerset, England and Wales.

The series takes place in 1685 and is set against the backdrop of the Monmouth Rebellion against the Catholic King James II of England. It starred Frederick Jaeger as Joachim, a German mercenary who assists Elam (Curtis Arden), a 13-year-old boy who believes that he is the illegitimate son of the Duke of Monmouth, who in turn is the illegitimate son of James II's Protestant elder brother Charles II of England and therefore claims to be the rightful heir to the throne. The series followed their various adventures, leading up to the climactic Battle of Sedgemoor, the last pitched battle on English soil.

== Cast ==
- Frederick Jaeger as Joachim
- Elizabeth Robillard as Perfect
- Curtis Arden as Elam
