= The Sleeping Prince (play) =

1953 play

First edition (publ. Hamish Hamilton 1954)

The Sleeping Prince: An Occasional Fairy Tale is a 1953 play by Terence Rattigan, conceived to coincide with the coronation of Elizabeth II in the same year. Set in London in 1911, it tells the story of Mary Morgan, a young actress, who meets and ultimately captivates Prince Charles of Carpathia, considered to be inspired by Carol II of Romania.

== Plot ==
In 1911, England, George V will be crowned king in a few days. In the meanwhile, many important guests and dignitaries arrive in Buckingham Palace for the coronation. Among them are: King Nicholas VIII of Balkan country of Carpathia, his father the Prince Regent, Charles, and his grandmother, the widowed Queen Dowager (the royals have probably been inspired by King Michael I of Romania, Carol II of Romania and Queen Marie of Romania.) The British government pamper the Royals during their stay in order to maintain Carpathia in the Triple Entente as the tensions between ruling families all over Europe is rising. So, they take Prince Regent Charles to watch a performance, starring Mary Morgan. When Charles is taken to meet the cast, he properly meets Mary Morgan, who he is interested in and invites Mary for dinner at the palace.

When Mary arrives, she feels disappointed when she finds out that Prince Charles is too stiff and pompous for her taste. Charles also fails to impress her with the large party Mary expected. The civil servant, Northbrook, asks Mary to leave early, but she doesn't. Charles ignores Mary for much of the supper because of phone calls and "matters of state." He tries making passes at Mary, but is rejected. She then explains her disappointment to the Prince, and how she expected "swaying romance", passion and gypsy violins, but instead got ignored by the prince in a stiff supper. The prince then changes his manners and tactics, complete with a violinist, leading the two to kiss. Mary admits she might be falling in love with Charles. Mary faints due to all the activity and drinks, so the prince places her in a bedroom inside the palace.

The next day, when Mary wakes up, she overhears a conversation with Nicholas and the German embassy, planning to overthrow the Prince Regent. Mary meets with the Queen Dowager, who invites her to attend the coronation in place of her sick lady-in-waiting. After the ceremony, Mary refuses to inform Charles about the plans to overthrow him. Nicholas invites Mary to the ceremonial ball, where she persuades to draw up a contract, where he reveals the Germans plans, but only if the Prince Regent agrees to a general election. The impressed Prince Charles finds out he's fallen in love with Mary and wants to stay with her. The day after the coronation ball, Mary's sincerity has inspired Charles to finally show love to his son.

The following morning, the Carpathians must leave England. Charles had planned for Mary to go back to Carpathia with them. In 18 months, the prince will no longer be a royal, but a normal, free citizen. Also in 18 months, Mary's performing contract will be over. as they say goodbye, the two realize how much can happen in 18 months.

== Original production ==
Following a week-long tryout at Manchester Opera House, Laurence Olivier directed the original production at the Phoenix Theatre in London's West End on 5 November 1953, with the following cast:

- Mary - Vivien Leigh
- The Regent - Laurence Olivier
- The Grand Duchess - Martita Hunt
- The Butler - Peter Barkworth
- The Major-Domo - Paul Hardwick
- The Archduchess - Elaine Inescourt
- The First Footman - Angus Mackay
- Northbrook - Richard Wattis
- The Baroness - Daphne Newton
- The King - Jeremy Spenser
- The Princess - Nicola Delman
- The Second Footman - Terence Owen
- The Countess - Rosamund Greenwood

The production ran for 274 performances.

== Critical reception ==
Kenneth Tynan wrote in the Daily Sketch:

"Once upon a time there was an actor called gruff Laurence Olivier, whose wife was an actress called pert Vivien Leigh, and a playwright called clever Terence Rattigan wrote a play for them, called The Sleeping Prince, with a gruff part for him and a pert part for her, and to nobody's surprise it ran happily ever after, with twice-weekly matinées."

The Spectator however, called it "the very best of its kind";

== Original Broadway production ==
Michael Redgrave directed the play on Broadway at the Coronet Theatre in November and December 1956, with the following cast:

- Mary - Barbara Bel Geddes
- The Regent - Michael Redgrave
- The Grand Duchess - Cathleen Nesbitt
- The Butler - Sorrell Booke
- The Major Domo - Ronald Dawson
- The Archduchess - Margaret Neff Jerome
- The First Footman - William Major
- Northbrook - Rex O'Malley
- The Baroness - Betty Sinclair
- The King - Johnny Stewart
- The Princess - Elwin Stock
- The Second Footman - Martin Waldron
- The Countess - Nydia Westman

The production ran for 60 performances.

== Adaptations ==
Film

Marilyn Monroe bought the rights to the play and subsequently produced The Prince and the Showgirl (1957), with Rattigan also writing the screen adaptation. The film was directed by and costarred Olivier, who reprised his role as Prince Charles. Although a box office disaster in its day, the New York Times credits Olivier with extracting a "delightful, comic performance" from Monroe.

Stage

In 1963 the play was also adapted into a musical as The Girl Who Came to Supper, with music and lyrics by Noël Coward.

== Awards and honors ==
=== Original Broadway production ===
Year	Award ceremony	Category	Nominee	Result
1957	Tony Award	Best Costume Design	Alvin Colt	Nominated
