= Crow Hollow =

1952 British film by Michael McCarthy

- Directed by: Michael McCarthy
- Written by: Vivian Milroy
- Based on: Crow Hollow by Dorothy Eden
- Produced by: William H. Williams executive Nat Cohen; Stuart Levy
- Starring: Donald Houston; Natasha Parry; Patricia Owens
- Cinematography: Robert LaPresle
- Edited by: Eric Hodges
- Production company: Bruton Film Productions
- Distributed by: Eros Films (UK)
- Release date: August 1952
- Running time: 70 minutes
- Country: United Kingdom
- Language: English

Crow Hollow is a 1952 British second feature ('B') mystery film directed by Michael McCarthy and starring Donald Houston, Natasha Parry and Patricia Owens. It was written by Vivian Milroy based on the 1950 novel Crow Hollow by Dorothy Eden. Newlywed Ann Amour survives a number of murder attempts, while her maid is found stabbed to death by unknown assailants.

The film was part financed by Nat Cohen.

== Plot ==
A young woman, Ann, falls in love with and marries Doctor Robert "Bob" Amour. She goes to live with him on his family estate, Crow Hollow, with his three eccentric aunts – for whom he is obliged to provide a home, as a condition of ownership of the estate.

Ann becomes increasingly concerned about incidents and about the behaviour of the three aunts and also an attractive young maid called Willow. On one occasion a large venomous spider jumps on her from a box of delivered flowers while her hair is being styled by Willow, on another she becomes suddenly and seriously ill immediately after eating some bitter tasting soup served her by Hester, one of the aunts. She becomes convinced that somebody is trying to kill her, and as her husband refuses to live anywhere else, she bribes the maid with a gift of clothes and slips out of the house with a suitcase, intending to leave by train. She is met before boarding the train by her friend Diana, who persuades her to return home; entering her own bedroom, she finds the maid dead – stabbed in the back whilst sitting at the dressing table wearing the dress Ann had just given her.

Police come to the house and quiz Ann. They doubt her belief that she was the intended victim because, despite the dress, she and the maid had different hair colours. An old rumour is mentioned that the maid, who had been adopted locally, was the child of a gardener at Crow Hollow. The police prohibit anybody – save Robert on professional calls – from leaving Crow Hollow while the murder is investigated.

Ann and Robert form a theory that Willow had been wearing a hat at the dressing table, concealing the colour of her hair, confirming in their minds that Ann had been the intended victim. To reassure Ann, her friend Diana comes to stay in the house.

Opal tells Robert that there is a phone call calling him out to a medical case. Ann realizes that the phone had not rung and stops him from leaving. Aunt Opal tries to serve her coffee while they discuss Ann's suspicions. Ann refuses to drink it, believing it to be poisoned. Robert is about to drink it, but changes his mind. In the subsequent argument, Opal admits that she had inadvertently killed Willow – her illegitimate daughter – meaning to kill Ann. Her plan had been that Robert would marry Willow, keeping Crow Hollow fully in the family. Robert takes Ann from the room saying that they are going to call the police. Opal picks up the cup of poisoned coffee and drinks it. Robert says to his wife outside the door "it's better this way".

When things have settled down, Robert is about to apply for a post as a hospital doctor, somewhat distant from Crow Hollow, when Ann tears up the application, saying she is now happy at Crow Hollow and wishes to stay.

== Cast ==
- Donald Houston as Doctor Robert Amour
- Natasha Parry as Ann Amour
- Patricia Owens as Willow
- Melissa Stribling as Diana Wilson
- Esma Cannon as Aunt Judith
- Nora Nicholson as Aunt Opal
- Susan Richmond as Aunt Hester
- Meadows White as Dexter
- Penelope Munday as Cass
- Denis Webb as Detective Inspector York
- Ewen Solon as Sergeant Jenkins
- Georgie Henschel as Nurse Baxter
- Gordon Bell as Alec
- Janet Barrow as Mrs Wilson
- Norman Claridge as hospital doctor
- Doris Yorke as hospital nurse

== Production ==
The film was shot at Merton Park Studios. There was also a scene shot at Gomshall and Shere railway station.

== Reception ==
The Monthly Film Bulletin wrote: "The story is treated more as if it were a stage play than a film. There is too little movement and the eeriness is overdone."

Picturegoer wrote: "This effort suffers from all the faults usually associated with British modest-budget, double-bill stuff – loose writing, direction without grip, poor lighting and amateurish appearance. Its chief interest lies in Natasha Parry's competent performance as the frightened wife. Donald Houston is colourless as her doctor husband, and the three supposedly forbidding aunts are put over only half-heartedly."

Picture Show wrote: "Well-directed and acted murder drama ... Natasha Parry gives a good performance."

In British Sound Films: The Studio Years 1928–1959 David Quinlan rated the film as "poor", writing: "Gloomy yarn, poorly made, performed without conviction. Best thing's the title."
