= Riek Schagen =

Dutch actress (1913–2008)

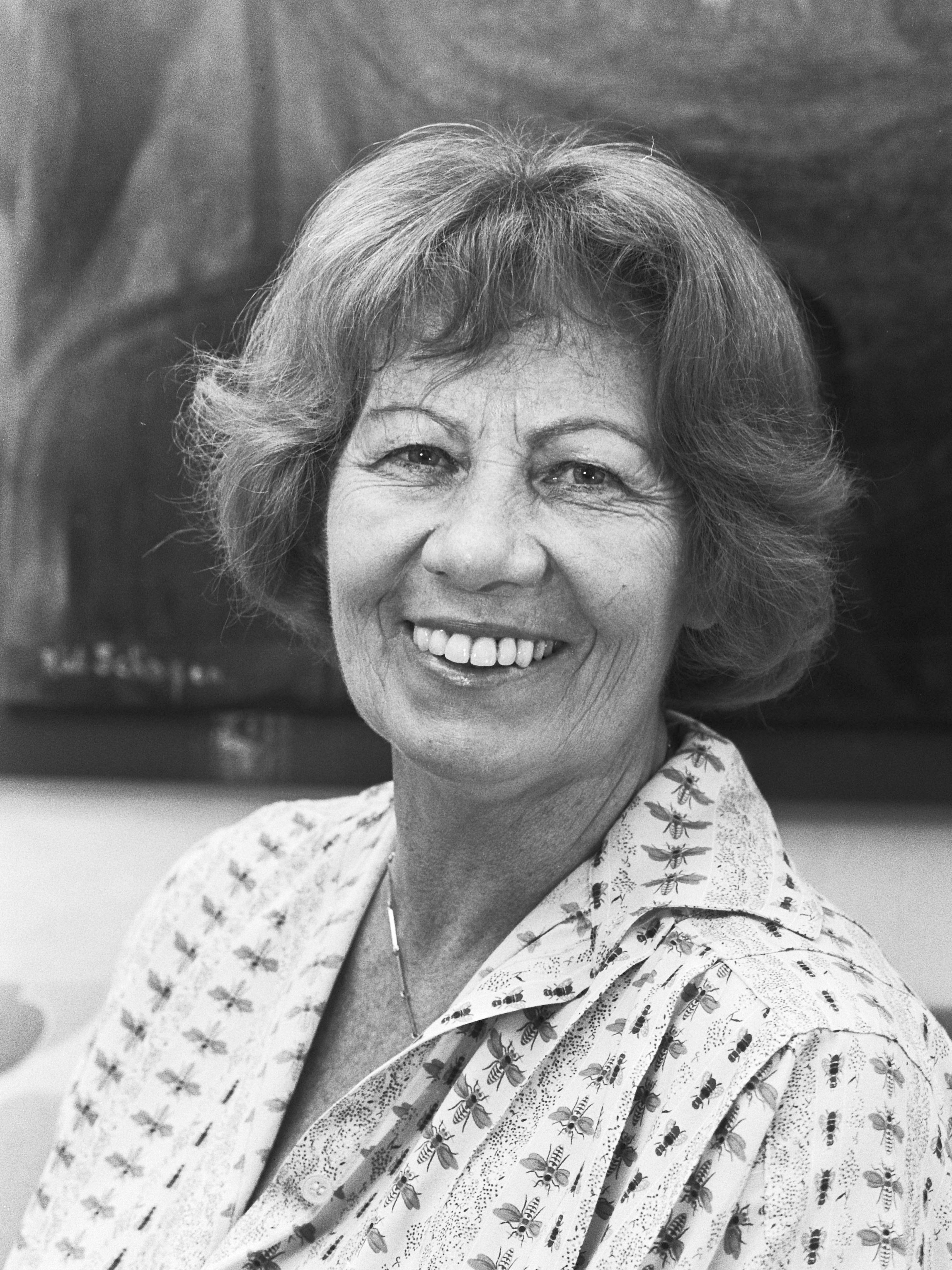
- Riek Schagen (1978)
- Born: Geertruida Hendrika Schagen; 15 November 1913; Amersfoort, Netherlands
- Died: 14 July 2008 (aged 94); Vorden, Netherlands
- Occupation(s): Actress, painter

Geertruida Hendrika (Riek) Schagen (15 November 1913 – 14 July 2008) was a Dutch stage, television and film actress well known for her role as housekeeper Saartje in the children's television series Swiebertje. Schagen was also an artist, who specialized in painting and had her own gallery, named GaleRiek. She appeared in the 1958 film Fanfare.

Schagen died in Vorden, Gelderland, the Netherlands, on 14 July 2008 at the age of 94.

== Filmography ==
Year	Title	Role	Notes
1947	Doortje Verkerk	Trui	
1955	Ciske the Rat	Tante Jans	
1959	Fanfare	Aaltje	
1961	Hunted in Holland	Mrs. Van Helder	
1962	The Silent Raid	Wim's Mother	
1972	The Little Ark	Vrouu Brodfelder	
1975	Keetje Tippel	Geest	
1978	Meneer Klomp	Koosje Klomp	
