= Sacco van der Made =

Dutch actor (1918–1997)

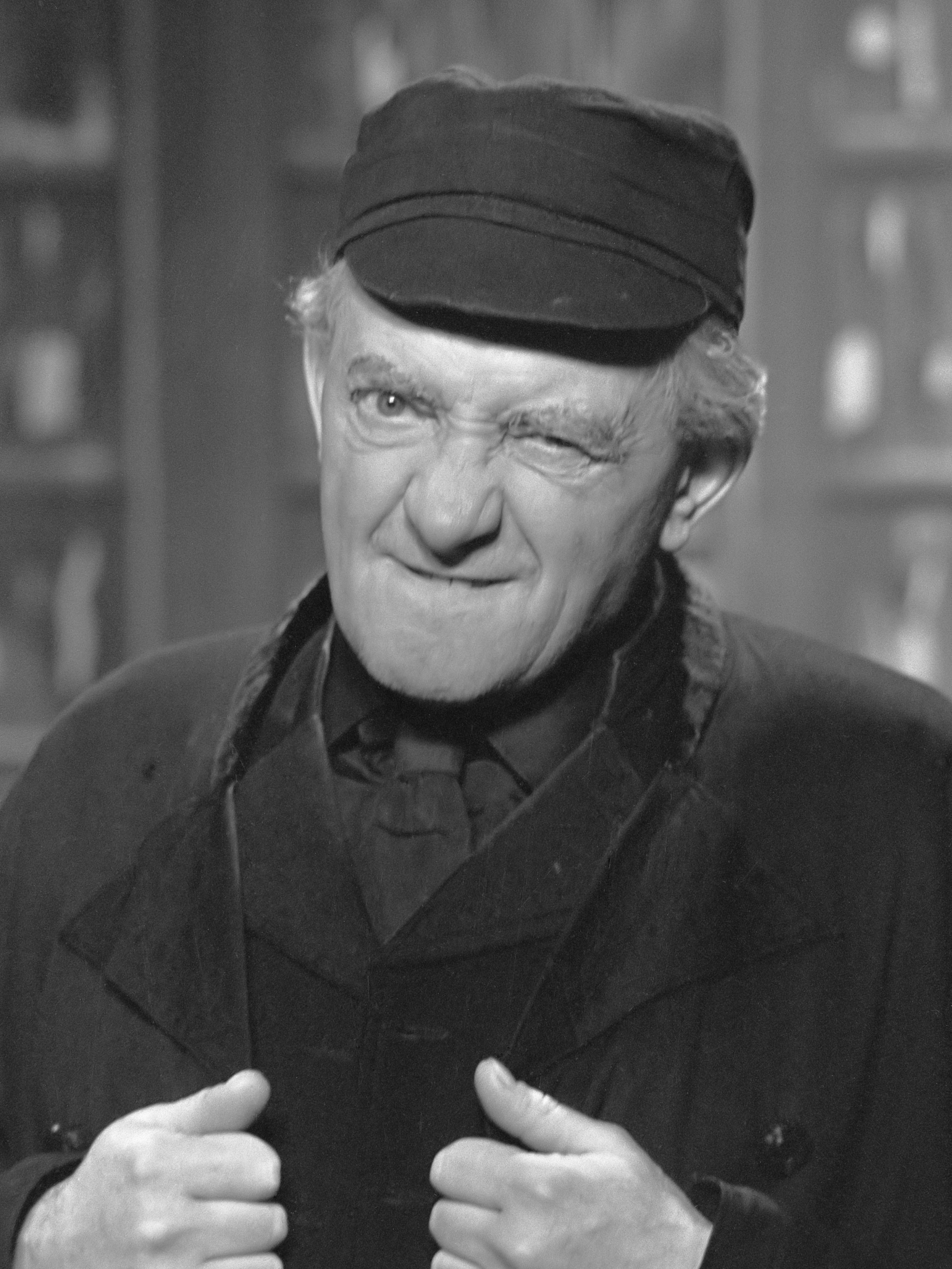
Sacco van der Made in 1974

Gerard Johannes "Sacco" van der Made (4 April 1918, Rotterdam – 21 December 1997, Rotterdam) was a Dutch actor. He provided the voice of Scrooge McDuck in the Dutch version in the television show DuckTales. His last big TV role was that of Bert Jansen in the comedy show Het zonnetje in huis, the Dutch version of Tom, Dick and Harriet. His last role was that of Gerard Krol in the crime series Baantjer. He died at the age of 79 and is buried at a general burial site in Nisse.

== Family ==
His son, Guus van der Made, is a TV producer who has worked on Het zonnetje in huis.

His brother, Jan van der Made, was a writer and a member of the NSB. He died in 1981.

== Filmography ==
Year	Title	Role	Notes
1961	Hunted in Holland	Police Superintendent	
1962	Kermis in de regen	Chauffeur	
1962	The Silent Raid	Merchant	
1963	Like Two Drops of Water	German Officer	Uncredited
1963	De vergeten medeminnaar	Peters	
1971	Business Is Business	Eigenaar Fopwinkel	
1975	Kind van de zon	Farmer	
1975	Zwaarmoedige verhalen voor bij de centrale verwarming	Vader	(segment "Mijnheer Frits")
1975	Rooie Sien	Pa van Buren	
1975	De laatste trein	Supervisor	
1975	Lifespan	Animal feeder	
1975	Dokter Pulder zaait papavers	poelier Pronk	
1975	Heb medelij, Jet!	Winkelier	
1977	Dokter Vlimmen	Oude boer	
1978	Pastorale 1943	Ballegooyen	
1978	Pinkeltje	Assistant Troelstra	
1979	Grijpstra & De Gier	Meneer Verboom	
1979	Een pak slaag	Hendrik J. Jonkind	
1981	Come-Back	Politieagent	
1983	Vroeger kon je lachen	Crematie bezoeker	
1987	De ratelrat	Cafébaas Troelstra	
1988	Honneponnetje	Tuinman	
1992	Boven de bergen	Veerman	
1996	De nieuwe moeder	Schreeuwende zwerver	
