= Mathspy =

- Mathspy logo
- Genre: Educational
- Created by: John Tully
- Written by: John Tully
- Directed by: David Roseveare
- Starring: Frederick Jaeger, Gavin Kitchen, Seeta Indrani
- Narrated by: Kenneth Watson
- Country of origin: United Kingdom
- No. of series: 1
- No. of episodes: 10

Production
- Running time: 10 minutes

Original release
- Release: 1988

Mathspy is a 1988 BBC Maths Educational programme.

== Episodes ==
1. Needle and Thread.
2. More Waste, Less Speed.
3. Play Your Cards.
4. Solid Clues.
5. To Make the Pattern Fit.
6. 1 Across, 1 Down.
7. F2 to B4.
8. Locks and Box.
9. Seven Times Able.
10. The Fourth Term.
11. Final challenge.

== Cast ==
Actor	Character
Frederick Jaeger	Hurst
Gavin Kitchen	Rick
Seeta Indrani	Sam
Kenneth Watson	Maths Voice
