= A Phoenix Too Frequent (film) =

1957 Australian TV play

- Based on: A Phoenix Too Frequent by Christopher Fry
- Directed by: Paul O'Loughlin
- Country of origin: Australia
- Original language: English

Production
- Running time: 60 mins
- Production company: ABC

Original release
- Network: ABC
- Release: 24 July 1957 (Sydney, live)
- Release: 11 September 1957 (Melbourne)

A Phoenix Too Frequent is a 1957 Australian TV play. It was made by the ABC at a time when Australian drama production was rare. Christopher Fry's play only featured a cast of three so was considered ideal for television production; the ABC filmed it again in 1966.

== Premise ==
A grieving widow in Ancient Greece gradually finds the attractions of a young soldier outweighs her determination to join her husband in the underworld.

== Cast ==
- Dinah Shearing as Dynamene
- James Condon as Tegeus
- Audrey Teesdale as Doto

== Production ==
Thelma Afford did the costumes.

Rehearsal took place at a studio in Darlinghurst. It was the fourth TV production from Paul O'Louglin who used techniques taught him by Rudi Bretz when Bretz visited Australia the previous year.

O'Loughlin said "TV has a lot of problems that don't exist either on the stage or in radio. You have to make every point valid in front of the camera and remember that it goes right into the homes of the audience. There’s none of the large illusion of the theatre. And you have to remember all the time that you’re working on a very small stage. You can’t go in for many long shots of crowd scenes, for instance, because the figures look too small to come to life. But you can create wonderfully intimate effects with close-ups in a way that is never possible on the stage. As in radio, you speak right into the ear of the audience; the whole thing is personal and intimate. That distinguishes it from the cinema."

Audrey Teesdale and Dinah Shearing had acted in a production of the play on stage several years previously at the Mercury Theatre. It was Teesdale's fourth television play.

The production took six weeks to plan and prepare. There was more than 40 hours of rehearsal, 30 hours in a workshop in Darlinghurst, two hours of dress and make up rehearsal at Gore Hill and seven and a half hoses of camera rehearsal. There was also a performance check lasting an hour before the telecast. During that time Desmonde Dowling designed scenery which was built in the workshop and costumes were designed.

== 1966 version ==
A Phoenix Too Frequent
- Based on: A Phoenix Too Frequent by Christopher Fry
- Directed by: Oscar Whitbread
- Country of origin: Australia
- Original language: English

Production
- Running time: 50 mins
- Production company: ABC

Original release
- Network: ABC
- Release: 6 July 1966 (Melbourne)
- Release: 13 July 1966 (Sydney)

There was another Australian version done in Melbourne in 1966, directed by Oscar Whitbread). It aired as part of Wednesday Theatre.

=== Cast ===
- Lynette Curran as Dynamene
- Sean Scully as Tegeus
- Fay Kelton as Doto
