= Hunted in Holland =

1961 British film by Derek Williams

- Opening titles
- Directed by: Derek Williams
- Screenplay by: Ian Dalrymple; Derek Williams
- Produced by: Ian Dalrymple
- Starring: Sean Scully; Jacques Verbrugge; Sandra Spurr
- Cinematography: Geoffrey Gurrin
- Edited by: Ernest Hosler
- Music by: Muir Mathieson
- Production company: Children's Film Foundation
- Distributed by: Wessex Film Productions Ltd.
- Release date: 1961 (Great Britain)
- Running time: 60 min.
- Country: Great Britain
- Languages: English; Dutch

Hunted in Holland is a 1961 British children's film/crime film directed by Derek Williams and starring Sean Scully, Jacques Verbrugge and Sandra Spurr. The script was written by Ian Dalrymple and Williams. It was produced by the Children's Film Foundation and shot in Eastmancolor.

== Plot ==
Tim visits his penfriend Piet van Helder in Holland. Piet has a kid sister named Aanike. Tim throws away a raw herring, which lands in the megaphone of a man guiding British tourists in a channel boat. Confused, he drops his walking stick into the water. When the children later fish it up, they discover a valuable diamond bracelet hidden inside. The guide actually belongs to a gang of diamond thieves. Tim conceals the bracelet inside a hollow cheese.

== Cast ==
- Sean Scully as Tim
- Walter Randall as the guide
- Thom Kelling as van Helder
- Jacques Verbrugge as Piet van Helder
- Sandra Spurr as Aanike van Helder
- Riek Schagen as Mrs. van Helder
- Jean Lemaire as Grandpa
- John Soer as man in blue
- Paul Ostra as diamond cutter
- Sacco van der Made as police superintendent
- Gerard Doting as Dutch thug
- Frans Kokshoorn as Dutch thug
- K. Brouwer as Dutch thug
- John Rowden as London crook

== Reception ==
The Monthly Film Bulletin wrote: "This fast-moving detective adventure should delight children up to the age at which backgrounds crammed with Dutchmen gaping at the camera crew becomes an illusion-shattering distraction. The barge's entry into Rotterdam is excitingly shot and edited, yet not much sophistication will be needed to pick holes in the story elsewhere – e.g., would a barrage of tomatoes defeat a gang who, a scene later, are shown to carry a gun? The boys have nicely contrasted characters, but the adults are grotesques overacted for laughs. The Dutch settings photograph prettily; however in this as in many other respects the film compares unfavourably with the polish of a recent American work for children with Low Countries locations, A Dog of Flanders."

== Homage ==
Hunted in Holland pays homage to Louis Lumière's 1895 silent film L'Arroseur Arrosé, in which a boy steps on the hose that a gardener is using to water his plants, cutting off the water flow. When the gardener tilts the nozzle up to inspect it, the boy releases the hose, causing the water to spray him. In this film Aanike van Helder is the scallywag.
