= Frederick Jaeger =

British actor (1928–2004)

- Born: Manfred Frederick Jaeger; 29 May 1928; Berlin, Germany
- Died: 18 June 2004 (aged 76); Mallorca, Spain
- Education: Guildhall School of Music and Drama
- Occupation: Actor
- Years active: 1949–1996
- Spouse(s): Hazel Penwarden (m. 1958; div. 1972) Elizabeth Griffiths (m. 1973)

Manfred Frederick Jaeger (29 May 1928 – 18 June 2004) was a German-born British film, television, theatre and radio character actor.

== Biography ==
Jaeger was born in Berlin, Germany; his family moved to England following Adolf Hitler's rise to power. He was educated at Lord Weymouth's Grammar School, Warminster, and the Guildhall School of Music and Drama, from which he graduated in 1948, becoming a British subject two years later. He made his first theatre appearance in 1949, and his film debut, The Black Tent, in 1956. He went on to make further film, television and radio appearances until retiring in 1996. He died in June 2004 aged 76.

He is well remembered by fans of the science fiction series Doctor Who for his roles in three serials. He appeared as Jano in The Savages in 1966, and as Sorenson in Planet of Evil in 1975. In 1977's The Invisible Enemy, he appeared as Professor Marius, creator of the robot dog K-9; his performance was described by reviewer John Peel as "superb".

== Filmography ==
=== Film ===
- The Iron Petticoat (1956) as Officers' Club Bartender (uncredited)
- Private's Progress (1956) as German Sentry (uncredited)
- The Black Tent (1956) as Koch – Junior Nazi Officer
- The Battle of the River Plate (1956) as Crewman on Graf Spee (uncredited)
- The One That Got Away (1957) as German Prisoner
- Ice Cold in Alex (1958) as 2nd German Officer
- I Was Monty's Double (1958) as Junior German Officer
- Play It Cool (1962) as Male Receptionist (uncredited)
- The War Lover (1962) as Air Crewman (uncredited)
- Mystery Submarine (1963) as Lt. Hence
- Farewell Performance (1963) as Paul Warner
- The Limbo Line (1968) as Alex
- The Looking Glass War (1970) as The Pilot
- Song of Norway (1970) as Henrik Ibsen
- One of Those Things (1971) as Melchoir
- Scorpio (1973) as Novins
- Situation (1974) as Klaus
- One of Our Dinosaurs Is Missing (1975) as German Radio Newscaster (uncredited)
- The Seven-Per-Cent Solution (1976) as Marker
- Voyage of the Damned (1976) as Werner Mannheim
- The Passage (1979) as German Major (uncredited)
- Winterspelt (1979) as Major Robert Wheeler
- Nijinsky (1980) as Gabriel Astruc
- At the Fountainhead (1980) as Kurt Langsdorf
- Indiana Jones and the Last Crusade (1989) as World War I Ace

=== Television ===
- Big Guns (1958) as Ni Ni Blascoe
- Deadline Midnight (1961) as Martin Maxwell
- The Avengers (1962–1967) as Benson / Getz
- Z-Cars (1965–1974) as George Eames / Sid Phipps / Eric Beazley
- Doctor Who: The Savages (1966) as Jano
- The Inside Man (1969) as Dr James Austen
- Callan (1969) as Colonel Max Belukov
- Department S (1970) as Major Harwood
- Special Branch (1970–74) as Commander Fletcher / Otto Pohl
- Dixon of Dock Green (1971) as John Charles Walton
- Jason King (1971) as Dacre
- The Persuaders! (1971) as Luther
- Pretenders (1972) as Joachim
- Doomwatch (1972) as Richard Massingham
- Warship (1973) as the foreign agent (in Season 1 Episode 4, 'Funny, They All Say That')
- Fall of Eagles (1974) as Holstein
- The Sweeney (1975) as Goldman
- Doctor Who: Planet of Evil (1975) as Sorenson
- The New Avengers (1976) as Jones
- One-Upmanship (1976–1978) as Cogg-Willoughby
- Doctor Who: The Invisible Enemy (1977) as Professor Marius
- The Standard (1978) as Adams
- Return of the Saint (1978) as Inspector Grant
- The Professionals (1978) as Schuman
- Some Mothers Do 'Ave 'Em (1978) as Mr. Barker
- The Omega Factor (1979) as Raglan
- Yes Minister (1980) as Godfrey Finch
- Take the High Road (1980) as Max Langemann
- Shoestring (1980) as Doctor Neil Stirling
- The Onedin Line (1980) as Max Van Der Rheede
- Minder (1982) as Inspector Klingmann
- The Gentle Touch (1982) as Herr Inspektor Ritter in episode "Dany" (season 4)
- Miss Marple (1984) as Chief Constable Colonel Melchett
- I Woke Up One Morning (1986) as Derek
- Mathspy (1988) as Hurst
- Keeping Up Appearances (1993) as Millburn
