= Kenneth Watson (actor) =

English Actor (1931–1998)

Kenneth Murray Watson
- Watson in Daleks' Invasion Earth 2150 A.D. (1966)
- Born: 16 November 1931; London, England
- Died: 21 July 1998 (aged 66)
- Occupation: Actor
- Children: 2

Kenneth Murray Watson (16 November 1931 – 21 July 1998) was a British television actor.

== Early life ==
Watson was born in London, England on 16 November 1931.

== Career ==
Watson is best known for playing Brian Blair in soap opera Take the High Road from 1980 to 1990, Ralph Lancaster in Coronation Street from 1975 to 1980 and Detective Inspector Scott in Dixon of Dock Green from 1972 to 1973.

Watson appeared in the Doctor Who serial The Wheel in Space as Bill Duggan, and was also booked to play a farmer in a later serial The Time Monster but was replaced by George Lee. In film, possibly his most memorable role was also Doctor Who related, with a supporting role in the Peter Cushing vehicle Daleks' Invasion Earth 2150 A.D..

He also appeared in a recurring roles as Tom Brierley in Mill of Secrets and as Detective Inspector Ian McGovern in Crown Court. He also played numerous minor roles in various sitcoms.

Later in his career, Watson was involved in writing and script editing, with credits including From Inner Space, The Westerners, Fancy That and The Bill.

== Personal life ==
Watson had a wife, Joan; and two children, Kate and Jamie. He died from pancreatic cancer on 21 July 1998, at the age of 66.

== Filmography ==
=== Film ===
Year	Title	Role	Notes
1964	First Men in the Moon	Second Reporter (uncredited)	
1966	Daleks' Invasion Earth 2150 A.D.	Craddock	
1973	Nothing But the Night	Jamie	
1977	Blind Man's Bluff	Mr. Hunter	

=== Television ===
Year	Title	Role	Notes
1956	Kidnapped	Mr Riach	2 episodes
1957	Adventure at Cow Crossing	Currington	TV movie
1957	The Runaway King	Villeneuve	TV movie
1957	Escape	Boggle Allen	1 episode
1958	Macbeth	Ross	2 episodes
1958	The Diary of Samuel Pepys	John Jackson	Miniseries, 1 episode
1958; 1967	Emergency Ward 10	Senior House Officer Graham / Bill Barron / Sgt Scott	21 episodes
1959	The Gentle Flame		TV movie
1960	Formula for Danger	Mr Winston	7 episodes
1960	Scotland Yard	Jack Gordon	1 episode
1960	Mill of Secrets	Tom Brierley	6 episodes
1961	After the Crash	Truman	TV movie
1961	Drama 61-67	Tom Hudson	1 episode
1961	Our Mister Ambler		1 episode
1961	Philoctetes	Sailor	Miniseries. 2 episodes
1961	Doctor Faustus	Scholar / Friar	1 episode
1961	Galileo	Cardinal Bellamine	TV movie
1961	BBC Sunday-Night Play	Henry Bevan	Episode: "The Barretts of Wimpole Street"
1962	Out of This World	Bud	1 episode
1962	Man of the World	Willie	1 episode
1962	The Sword in the Web	Lannes	1 episode
1963	Taxi!	Harry Snow	1 episode
1963; 1964	ITV Play of the Week	Sgt Slade / 2nd Lieutenant Smith	2 episodes
1963–1973	Dixon of Dock Green	Detective Inspector Scott	19 episodes
1964	Ghost Squad	Sandy	1 episode
1964	Compact	Car Salesman	1 episode
1965	R3	Harry	1 episode
1966	The Liars	Dr Jennings	1 episode
1966	Orlando	McIver	1 episode
1966	The Heart of Midlothian	Nisbet	TV movie
1966	King of the River	Plater	1 episode
1966	United!	Mr Stevenson	1 episode
1967	Dr. Finlay's Casebook	Pete McInnes	1 episode
1967	Armchair Theatre	Perkins / Dr Stephenson	2 episodes
1967–1971	Merry-Go-Round	Sigfrid / Mr Thurgar	5 episodes
1968	The Troubleshooters	Macfarlane	1 episode
1968	The Revenue Men	Smiler	1 episode
1968	Doctor Who	Bill Duggan	Serial: "The Wheel in Space", 3 episodes
1968; 1971	Take Three Girls	TV Interviewer / Clergyman	2 episodes
1968–1978	Z-Cars	Mr. Sowerby / Detective Inspector Morris / Ackroyd / Air Traffic Control Officer / Douglas	5 episodes
1968–1980	Coronation Street	Ralph Lancaster / Detective-Constable Parry	19 episodes
1969	The Gold Robbers	Dr Lucas	Miniseries, 1 episode
1969	Public Eye	Detective Inspector Risman	1 episode
1969	Randall and Hopkirk (Deceased)	Police Sergeant	1 episode
1969	Dad’s Army	The R.A.F. Officer	1 episode
1969	Castle Haven	Chivers	1 episode
1969; 1970	The Flaxton Boys	Physician / Cordell	2 episodes
1969; 1970	ITV Saturday Night Theatre	Philip Staines / Pat	2 episodes
1969; 1971	Hadleigh	Bamber / Bromley	2 episodes
1970	A Stranger on the Hills	John Stern	2 episodes
1970	Manhunt	Jacques Maillot	1 episode
1970	Ace of Wands	Dr Calder	1 episode
1970	No – That's Me Over Here!	1st Man	2 episodes
1970	Timeslip	Dr Fordyce	2 episodes
1970; 1974	Special Branch	Detective Inspector/ Falk	2 episodes
1971	Nearest and Dearest	First Policeman	1 episode
1971	The More We Are Together	Wally Dunk	1 episode
1971	Out of the Unknown	Hine	1 episode
1971	Justice	Detective Inspector Charlton	1 episode
1971	Softly Softly: Task Force	George Spender / Mr Gower	2 episodes
1972	The Shadow of the Tower	James Taite	1 episode
1972	Time of Your Life	The Policeman	1 episode
1972	Clochemerle	Sergeant	2 episodes
1972	Budgie	Prisoner Governor	1 episode
1972	New Scotland Yard	Prison Officer Giles	1 episode
1972	Follyfoot	Charlie	1 episode
1972	Holly	Plain Clothes Officer	3 episodes
1972	The Protectors	Inspector Jack Newman	1 episode
1972	Pathfinders	Squadron Leader Stevens	1 episode
1973	Nothing but the Night	Jamie	TV movie
1973	Pardon My Genie	Percy Cobbledick	3 episodes
1973	Whodunnit?	James Charron	3 episodes
1973	Spy Trap	Danvers	1 episode
1973	The Onedin Line	Norris	1 episode
1973	Some Mothers Do 'Ave 'Em	Orderley	1 episode
1973	Upstairs, Downstairs	Arthur Naws	1 episode
1973	The Adventures of Black Beauty	Mr Jones	2 episodes
1973–1975	The Brothers	Reg Turner	6 episodes
1973–1975	Man About the House	Police Sergeant / Policeman / Bank Manager	3 episodes
1974	Funny Ha-Ha	Mr Bonnie	1 episode
1974	...And Mother Makes Five	Dr Frazer	1 episode
1974	Churchill's People	John MacPherson	1 episode
1974–1977	Look and Read	Jack Dunbar / Mr Barber	20 episodes
1974–1977	Crown Court	Det. Inspector Ian McGovern	10 episodes
1974–1980	Out of the Past		6 episodes
1975	Village Hall	David Paterson	1 episode
1975	Centre Play	Sgt Johnston / Prestwick	2 episodes
1975	Jackanory Playhouse	King Uther	1 episode
1975; 1979	Emmerdale Farm	Phil Fletcher / Grant Brantford	7 episodes
1976	George and Mildred	Mr Jolly	1 episode
1977	The Phoenix and the Carpet	Policeman	1 episode
1977	Headmaster	Mr Linwood	1 episode
1977	Three Piece Suite	Cast Member	1 episode
1977	Horse in the House	PC Davies	3 episodes
1977	Rough Justice	Jim Woodley	4 episodes
1977	The Paper Lads	Marlow	1 episode
1977	The New Avengers	Salvation Army Major	2 episodes
1978	Within These Walls	Dr Farrer	1 episode
1978	The Les Dawson Show	Various characters	1 episode
1978	The Sweeney	Horrocks	1 episode
1978	The Morecambe & Wise Show		1 episode
1978	The Sandbaggers	Hugh Douglas	1 episode
1978	The Voyage of Charles Darwin	Thumper	1 episode
1978	General Hospital		1 episode
1978	Bernie		1 episode
1978; 1980	The Professionals	Boss / Detective Supt. Tulson	2 episodes
1978–1981	ITV Playhouse	The Radio Doctor / Roger Haydon / Emmajs / Bill	4 episodes
1979	The Fall and Rise of Reginald Perrin	Superintendent	1 episode
1979	Hazell	Bert	1 episode
1979	Murder at the Wedding	Inspector Peach	Miniseries, 1 episode
1979	Bloomers	Traffic Warren	1 episode
1980	Very Like a Whale		TV movie
1980	Jukes of Piccadilly	Police Inspector	1 episode
1980	A Question of Guilt	Clerk	2 episodes
1980	The Enigma Files	Inspector Tolly	1 episode
1980	Buccaneer	Flight Engineer	1 episode
1980	Grandad	Scrap Dealer	1 episode
1980	Sky Pirates	Police Sergeant	TV movie
1980–1990	Take the High Road	Brian Blair	397 episodes
1981	Singles	Radio Doctor	TV movie
1982	Airline	Air Commodore Rupert	1 episode
1988	Mathspy	Narrator	
1994	Wycliffe	Carter	1 episode
1996	The Bill	Broadbent	1 episode

=== Writing ===
Year	Title	Role	Notes
	Inner Space		
	The Westerners		
	Fancy That		
	The Bill		
