= Vivian Milroy =

English director and producer (1917–2009)

- Born: 3 June 1917; London, England
- Died: 2 September 2009 (aged 92)
- Occupation: Film director; Television director Film producer Screenwriter

Vivian Milroy (1917–2009) was an English director and producer working in both film and television, and was also a screenwriter in both mediums. He first trained as an actor at RADA, graduating in 1939, and for a short time at the very start of his career, he performed as an actor in television films. He is best known for the films Don't Say Die (1950), which he both directed and wrote, and Crow Hollow (1952); and also for directing Armchair Theatre and Coronation Street.

== Filmography ==
=== Television (Director) ===
- Torchy the Battery Boy (Series Two, 1959-60)
- Coronation Street (1961-63)
- ITV Play of the Week (1961)
- Armchair Theatre (1957)
- Hour of Mystery (1957)
- Those Kids (1956)

=== Television (Producer) ===
- Jack and the Beanstalk (Short) (1956)
- The Star of Bethlehem (TV Short) (1956)
- Wednesday Theatre (TV Series) (1953)
- The Practical Jokers (1953)
- Huckleberry Finn (TV Series) (1952)
- Back to the River (1952)
- The Auction (1952)
- The Wilks' Fortune (1952)
- The Rightful King of France? (1952)
- Life on the Mississippi (1952)
- The Man in Armour (1952)
- All's Well (1952)
- Lost Property (1952)
- Fancy Dress (1952)
- Teaching Teacher (1952)
- Back in Armour (1952)
- 1952 Persephone (1952)

=== Film (Director) ===
- Don't Say Die (1950)

=== Film (Producer) ===
- The Fish and the Angel (TV Movie) (1953)
- Skippy Smith Goes to the Circus (TV Movie) (1953)
- Tom's Goblin (TV Movie) (1953)
- An American Gentleman (TV Movie) (1953)
- The Princess and the Pea (TV Movie) (1952)
- The Princess and the Woodcutter (TV Movie) (1952)
- The Locked Room (TV Movie) (1952)
- The Princess and the Swineherd (TV Movie) (1951)
- Rumpelstiltskin (TV Movie) (1951)
- John of the Fair (TV Movie) (1951)
- Don't Say Die (1950)
- The Song in the Forest (TV Movie) (1950)
- Cupid and the Commander (TV Movie) (1949)
- The Bishop's Candlesticks (TV Short) (1949)
- The Ghost of Monsieur Tronjolly (TV Movie) (1949)

=== Screenwriter and writer ===
- Formula for Danger (1960)
- Crow Hollow (1952)
- The Sunday Break (1958)
- 1954 Earthquake in Macedonia (1954)
- 1953 The Fish and the Angel (1953)
- Don't Say Die (1950)
- The Song in the Forest (TV Movie) (1950)
- The Innocent Crocodile (TV Movie) (1948)

=== Actor ===
- Big Ben (TV Movie) (1949)
- 1948 The Rivals (TV Movie) (1948)
- 1948 Take Back Your Freedom (TV Movie) (1948)
