= Mill of Secrets =

1960 British TV children's adventure series

Mill of Secrets is a 1960 British television series. Produced by Associated Television and aired on ITV, it was a six-part children's adventure serial. According to IMDb, cast included Gene Anderson, Glyn Houston, Kenneth Watson, David Langford, Janet Bradbury and Sean Scully. The series exists in its entirety but has yet to appear on home video.

== Cast ==
- Gene Anderson as Joanna Clarke
- Glyn Houston as Douglas Wallace
- Kenneth Watson as Tom Brierley
- David Langford as Simon Bancroft
- Janet Bradbury as Amanda Bancroft
- Sean Scully as Claude 'Snow' Nolan
- John Ringham as Auctioneer
- Rex Graham as Percy Clements
- Nicholas Grimshaw as Farmer

== See also ==
- The Voodoo Factor
