= The Resurrection (play) =

The Resurrection is a short prose play by William Butler Yeats depicting a discussion among three men ("The Greek" or "The Egyptian," "The Hebrew," and "The Syrian") who are among the first to meet the resurrected Christ. Offstage, a rampaging mob of followers of Dionysus enact their bloody and crazed rituals, all the while threatening to burst into the house in which the protagonists are debating.

Yeats' principal theme is the collapse of the classical worldview and the impending collapse of the Christian. The Greek and Hebrew are left intellectually and emotionally crippled at the end of the play, whilst the Syrian, a believer in the power of the irrational, is the only character who can truly understand and embrace the consequences of the resurrection.

Yeats began writing the play in 1925 or 1926, and it was first published in The Adelphi in 1927. It was first performed in the summer of 1934 at the smaller peacock theatre within the Abbey Theatre in Dublin.
