= Paul Hardwick =

English actor (1918–1983)

Paul Hardwick photographed by Angus McBean, 1958

Paul Hardwick (15 November 1918 in Bridlington, East Riding of Yorkshire – 22 October 1983, London) was an English actor.

== Career ==
=== Theatre ===
- The Wars of the Roses (1965) – Gloucester
- Richard II (1970) – John of Gaunt

=== Filmography ===
Year	Title	Role	Notes
1957	The Prince and the Showgirl	Major Domo	
1958	A Night to Remember	Guggenheim's Valet	Uncredited
1966	A Man for All Seasons	Courtier	
1967	The Long Duel	Jamadar	
1968	Romeo and Juliet	Lord Capulet	
1970	Julius Caesar	Messala	
1983	Octopussy	Soviet Chairman (implied to be Leonid Brezhnev)	Final film role

=== Television ===
Year	Title	Role	Notes
1972	Man at the Top	Abe Brown	7 episodes
1977–1978	1990	Faceless	11 episodes
1978	The Professionals	Chief Constable Green	ITV, 1 episode
