= The Prince and the Showgirl =

1957 film by Laurence Olivier

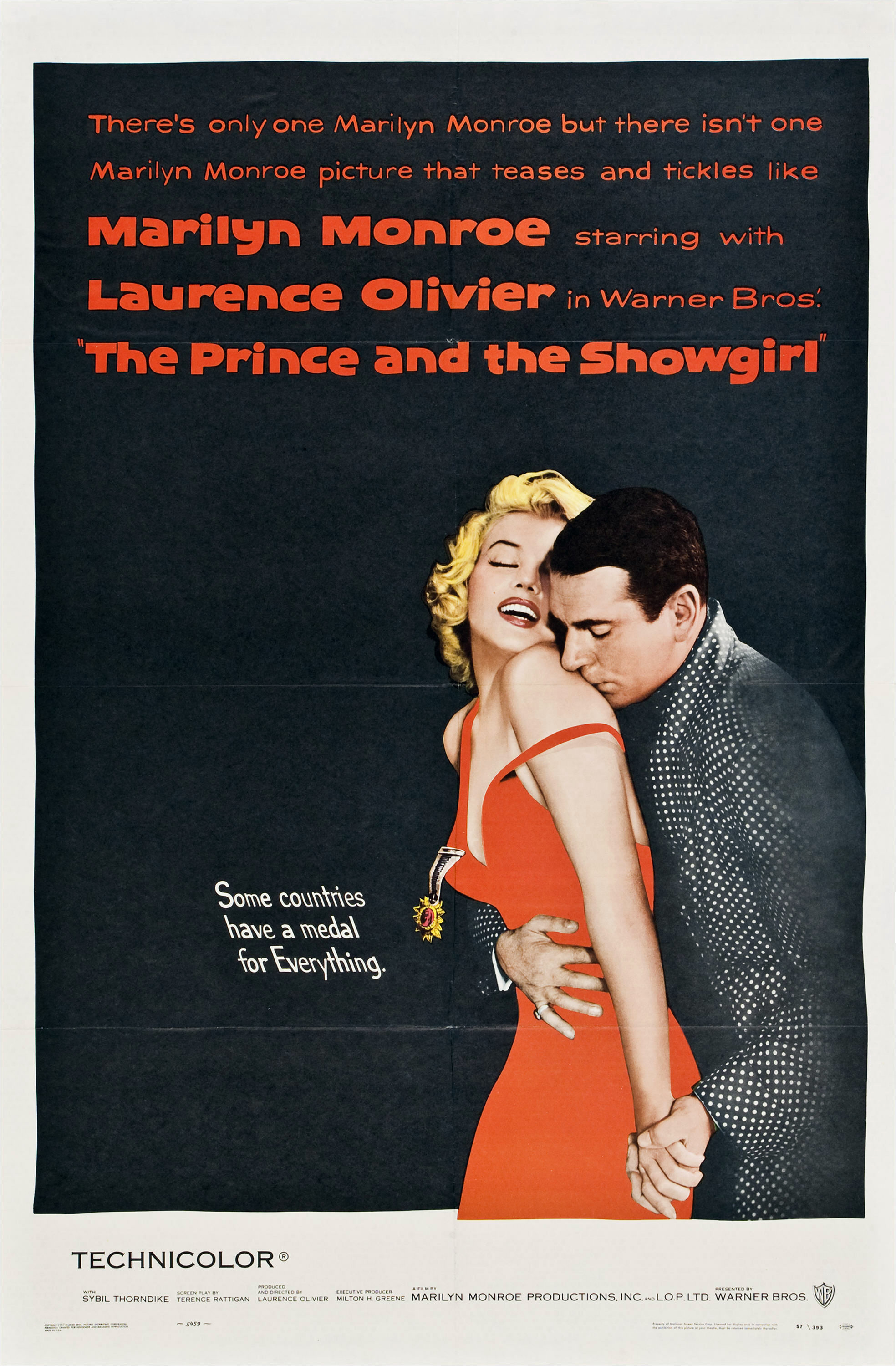
- Theatrical release poster by Bill Gold
- Directed by: Laurence Olivier
- Screenplay by: Terence Rattigan
- Based on: The Sleeping Prince; 1953 play by Terence Rattigan
- Produced by: Laurence Olivier
- Starring: Marilyn Monroe; Laurence Olivier
- Cinematography: Jack Cardiff
- Edited by: Jack Harris
- Music by: Richard Addinsell
- Production company: Marilyn Monroe Productions
- Distributed by: Warner Bros. Pictures
- Release dates: 13 June 1957 (United States); 3 July 1957 (United Kingdom)
- Running time: 115 minutes
- Country: United Kingdom
- Language: English
- Box office: $4.3 million

The Prince and the Showgirl (originally titled The Sleeping Prince) is a 1957 British romantic comedy film starring Marilyn Monroe and Laurence Olivier, who also served as director and producer. The screenplay written by Terence Rattigan was based on his 1953 stage play The Sleeping Prince. The Prince and the Showgirl was filmed at Pinewood Studios in Buckinghamshire.

== Plot ==
In London in 1911, George V will be crowned king on 22 June and in the preceding days, many important dignitaries arrive, including the 16-year-old King Nicholas VIII of the (fictional) Balkan country of Carpathia, with his father the stiff and pompous widower Prince Regent Charles, and his maternal grandmother the widowed Queen Dowager of Carpathia (inspired by King Michael I of Romania, King Carol II of Romania and Queen Marie of Romania respectively).

The British Government had decided that keeping Carpathia in the Triple Entente is critical amid the rising tensions in Europe. They wish to pamper the royals during their stay in London and assign civil servant Northbrook for the task. Northbrook takes Charles to the musical performance The Coconut Girl. During the intermission, Charles meets the cast backstage and is smitten with performer Elsie Marina, to whom he sends a formal invitation for midnight dinner at the Carpathian Embassy.

Elsie meets Northbrook at the Embassy before Charles arrives and expects a large party, but soon she realises that Charles' true intentions are to seduce her over a private supper, something a girl with her abundant feminine charms has been through too many times to fall for, and she attempts to leave. Northbrook persuades her to remain, promising to provide an excuse for her to escape after supper. When Charles makes a clumsy pass at her, she immediately rebuffs him and explains that she had hoped that he would sway her with romance, passion, and "gypsy violins." In response, Charles changes his style and tactics, complete with a violinist. The two eventually kiss and Elsie admits that she may be falling in love, turning aside Northbrook's pre-agreed attempt to help her leave the Embassy. When Elsie passes out due to being encouraged to drink too much vodka, Charles has four servants carry her on their shoulders like a log into an adjoining bedroom, where she spends the night.

The following day, Elsie overhears that Nicholas is plotting with the German Embassy to overthrow his father. Promising not to tell, Elsie then meets the Dowager Queen, Charles' mother-in-law, who invites Elsie to join them for the coronation in place of her sick lady-in-waiting. The ceremony passes and Elsie refuses to tell Charles of the treasonous plot. Nicholas invites Elsie to the coronation ball, where she persuades him to agree to a contract in which he will confess his and the Germans' intent, but only if Charles agrees to a general election. Charles is impressed and realises that he has fallen in love with Elsie. The morning after the ball, Elsie helps reunite Charles and Nicholas. Her honesty and sincerity have inspired Charles to finally show sincere love to his son.

The next day, the Carpathians must return home. Charles had planned to have Elsie join them, but his Regency will end in 18 months and he will then be a free citizen. Elsie reminds him that her music-hall contract will expire at the same time. They both realise that much can happen in 18 months and they say goodbye to each other.

== Cast ==
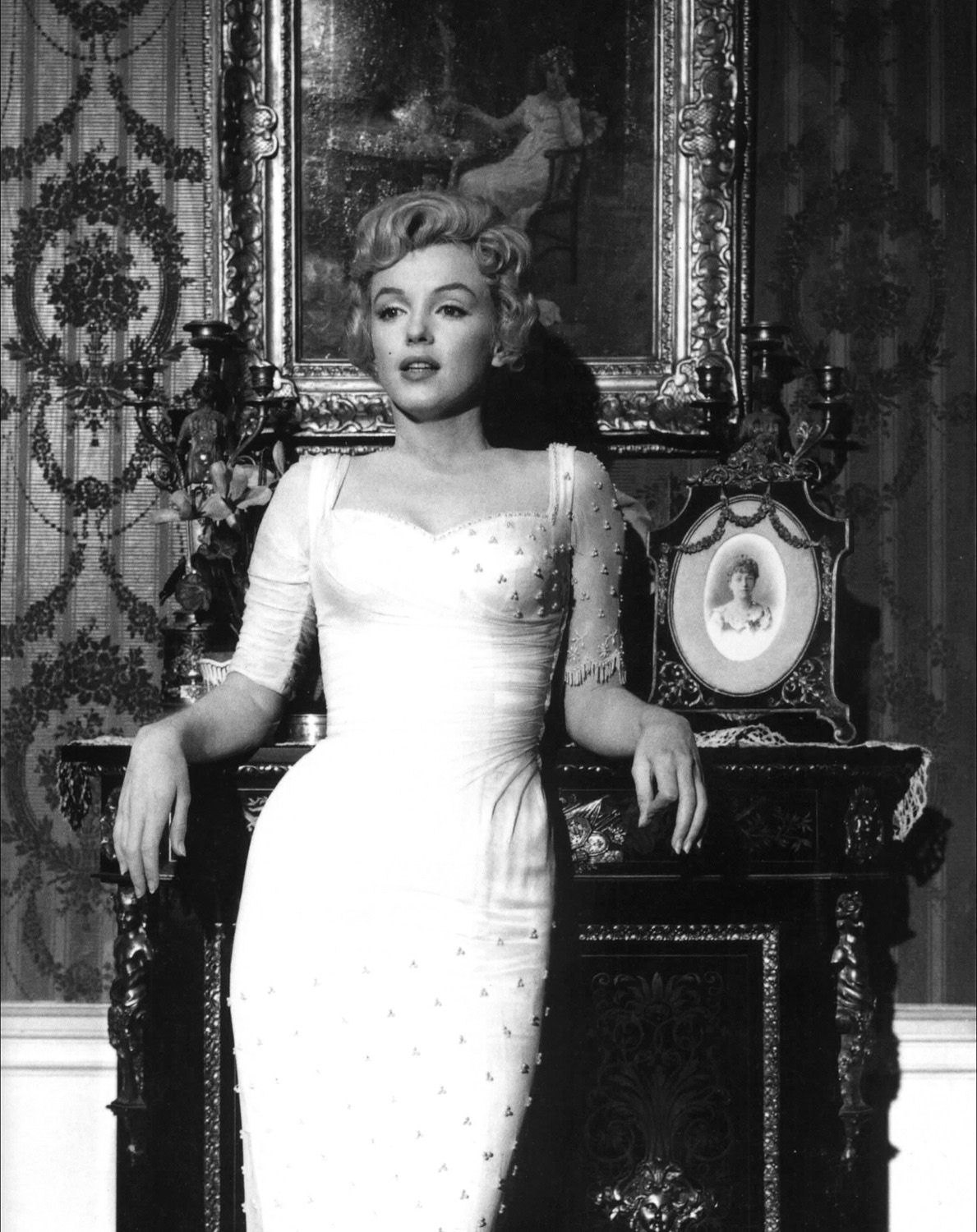
Promotional photograph of Monroe by Milton H. Greene

- Marilyn Monroe as Elsie Marina
- Laurence Olivier as Charles, the Prince Regent of Carpathia
- Sybil Thorndike as the Dowager Queen
- Richard Wattis as Northbrook
- Jeremy Spenser as King Nicolas
- Paul Hardwick as Major Domo
- Esmond Knight as Colonel Hoffman
- Rosamund Greenwood as Maud
- Aubrey Dexter as The Ambassador
- Maxine Audley as Lady Sunningdale
- Harold Goodwin as Call Boy
- Jean Kent as Maisie Springfield
- Daphne Anderson as Fanny
- Gillian Owen as Maggie
- Vera Day as Betty
- Margot Lister as Lottie
- Charles Victor as Theatre Manager
- David Horne as The Foreign Office
- Gladys Henson as Dresser

== Production ==
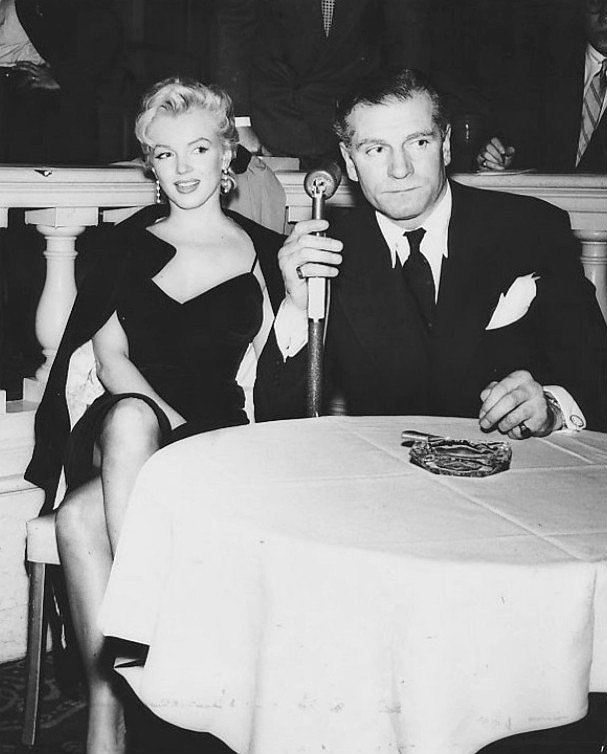
Marilyn Monroe and Laurence Olivier at a press conference announcing their partnership

The film was produced and directed by Laurence Olivier. It was shot in Technicolor at Pinewood Studios. Marilyn Monroe had formed her own company, Marilyn Monroe Productions, through which she purchased the rights to Terence Rattigan's The Sleeping Prince. Olivier and Vivien Leigh had played the lead roles in the original London production of the play.

Production was marred with difficulties between Monroe and her costars and the production team. According to Jean Kent, Monroe "appeared dirty and dishevelled" and "never arrived on time, never said a line the same way twice, seemed completely unable to hit her marks on the set and couldn’t and wouldn’t do anything at all without consulting her acting coach, Paula Strasberg." Kent claimed that she witnessed her costar Richard Wattis, who appeared in many scenes with Monroe, "take to drink because takes had to be done so many times" and that Monroe had an uneasy relationship with the normally quiet and placid cinematographer Jack Cardiff, who said that Olivier referred to her as a "bitch." Olivier also reportedly showed a strong dislike of Monroe and Strasberg, whom he evicted from the set at one point, causing Monroe to refuse to continue shooting until Strasberg returned. The relationship between Olivier and Monroe worsened when Olivier told her to "try and be sexy." According to Kent, Olivier's difficulties with Monroe caused him "to age 15 years."

Donald Sinden, a contract star for the Rank Organisation at Pinewood Studios, had a permanent dressing room four doors from Monroe's during filming, although he was working on a different film. Sinden said:

She was still suffering from the effects of the Method school of acting, so one day I had the props department make up a notice that I fixed to my door saying:

Office of the Nazak [Kazan, backwards] Academy. You too can be inaudible. New egos superimposed. Motivations immobilised. Imaginary stone-kicking eradicated. Um's & Er's rendered obsolete. Motto: 'Though 'Tis Method Yet There's Madness In It'.

I waited inside and presently heard the usual footsteps of her and her entourage. They paused outside and from the entire group I only heard one laugh—that of Monroe. The door burst open and in she came, slamming the door in the faces of her livid retainers. From that moment on, whenever the poor girl could not face the problems of her hybrid existence—which was frequently—she popped in for a natter and a giggle. Of course as a sex symbol she was stunning, but sadly, she must be one of the silliest women I have ever met.

Monroe had an uncredited English body double for the movie, a young model whose stage name was Una Pearl. It was announced in Picturegoer magazine 18 August 1956.

== Release ==
The film opened on 13 June 1957 at the Radio City Music Hall in New York and in Los Angeles and London on 3 July 1957.

== Reception ==
=== Box office ===
The Prince and the Showgirl was not a major box-office success, faring poorly in comparison to Monroe's earlier releases, such as The Seven Year Itch and Bus Stop. Particularly popular in the United Kingdom, it failed to find the same success in the U.S. but managed to earn a substantial profit.

=== Critical response ===
Variety wrote in its original review: "This first indie production of Marilyn Monroe's company is a generally pleasant comedy, but the pace is leisurely. Filmed in London with a predominantly British cast, the film is not a cliche Cinderella story as its title might indicate." The New York Times stated that the film lacked originality and that Rattigan's characterizations were "too limiting" and "dull" to allow Monroe and Olivier to be showcased to their fullest potential. On the Rotten Tomatoes website, the film has an approval rating of 56% based on nine critics' reviews, with an average score of 5.7/10.

Monroe and Olivier received particular praise for their performances especially Monroe who did her performance so well many British studios wanted to work with her on future movies. Thorndike's performance was also described as "excellent" by Variety.

=== Awards and nominations ===
Date of ceremony	Award	Category	Recipients and nominees	Result
December 1957	National Board of Review Awards	Best Supporting Actress	Sybil Thorndike	Won
1958	British Academy Film Awards	Best British Actor	Laurence Olivier	Nominated
1958	British Academy Film Awards	Best British Screenplay	Terence Rattigan	Nominated
1958	British Academy Film Awards	Best British Film	The Prince and the Showgirl	Nominated
1958	British Academy Film Awards	Best Film from any Source	The Prince and the Showgirl	Nominated
1958	British Academy Film Awards	Best Foreign Actress	Marilyn Monroe	Nominated
29 July 1958	David di Donatello Awards	Best Foreign Actress	Marilyn Monroe	Won
10 September 1958	Laurel Awards	Top Female Comedy Performance	Marilyn Monroe	4th place
26 February 1959	Crystal Star Awards	Best Foreign Actress	Marilyn Monroe	Won

== Associated works ==
The 2011 film My Week with Marilyn depicts the week in which Monroe was escorted around London by personal assistant Colin Clark during the production of The Prince and the Showgirl. My Week with Marilyn is largely based upon two books written by Clark recounting his experiences during the production: My Week with Marilyn (2000) and The Prince, the Showgirl, and Me: Six Months on the Set With Marilyn and Olivier (1996). Both books and the film depict Monroe beginning a friendship and semi-romantic relationship with Clark for a brief time during production.

== See also ==
- List of British films of 1957
