= Charlotte Cushman Foundation =

American philanthropic organization

- Predecessor: Charlotte Cushman Club Library and Museum (1907-1999)
- Formation: 2000; 26 years ago
- Founder: Lydia Ellicott Morris (1907)
- Purpose: To promote theater arts in the Philadelphia area with grants to performers in productions by non-profit theaters.
- Headquarters: 320 South Broad Street, Room 120, Philadelphia, Pa, 19102
- Location: Philadelphia, Pennsylvania, U.S.
- Revenue: $36,937 (2017)
- Expenses: $81,510 (2017)
- Website: The Charlotte Cushman Foundation

The Charlotte Cushman Foundation (CCF) is a philanthropic organization in Philadelphia, Pennsylvania, incorporated in the Commonwealth of Pennsylvania. It is named after actress Charlotte Cushman (1817–1876). The Charlotte Cushman Foundation funds Philadelphia, regional non-profit theatres with grants for performers. The purpose of the Foundation is to promote the theatre arts and the public appreciation thereof.

The Cushman Foundation was founded by the officers of the Charlotte Cushman Club and Library. Originally established in 1907, and closed in 1999, the Charlotte Cushman Club was a boarding house for touring actresses who needed safe, respectable, inexpensive lodgings.

Beginning in 1957, in honor of the club's 50th anniversary, the Cushman Club has given the Cushman Award for Lifetime Achievement in the Theatre to a distinguished contributor to the vitality of the theatre. Beginning in 1995, the Charlotte Cushman Award for Outstanding Leading Actress in a Play continues to be awarded as part of Philadelphia's Barrymore Awards for Excellence in Theater.

== History ==
=== The Charlotte Cushman Club ===
The Charlotte Cushman Club was established as a boarding house for touring actresses needing respectable, inexpensive, safe lodgings. Women performers were unwelcome in many hotels; and they were frequently the recipients of bold advances from drummers (traveling salesmen) and other uncouth types. The Cushman Club was hailed in 1923 as "the leading organization of its kind in the country." Cushman Clubs were established in Chicago and Boston as well as Philadelphia.

The club was founded by Quaker Lydia Ellicott Morris in 1907. It was named in honor of Charlotte Cushman (1816–1876), America's first internationally renowned actress and a favorite dining companion of Abraham Lincoln. It had been Cushman's lifelong dream to establish hostelries where women of the stage could escape "the brothel-like atmosphere of cheap hotels and rude stares" of corset drummers – and worse. Cushman herself died years previous to the founding of the club, and did not found nor fund either the club or the Foundation.

An early supporter, Mr. Peterson, donated $50,000. Annual teas were another source of funds. Strong support came from the Theatrical Managers Association and from various women's clubs. Elaborate fundraisers involved both stage and society supporters, to raise money for the club. The Cushman Club became successful as a ladies theatre club, hospitality center and clubhouse for both men and women.

Over the years, the club had several locations. Early on, lodgings were located 10th and Pine, and then at the southwest corner of 12th and Locust Streets. As of 1920, it moved to 1010 Spruce Street. Rooms there were named in honor of actresses who donated furnishings, including Julia Marlowe, Lillian Russell and Adele Ritchie. In 1929, 1010 Spruce Street provided lodging for 50 actresses, and had a waiting list of 100. The Spruce Street location was bought by Miss Olive Pardee in 1931 and given to the Jefferson Medical College Hospital, to become a home for nurses. Rooms were also provided at The Bellevue-Stratford Hotel. In 1963 the Club moved to 239 S. Camac Street, former home of the Poor Richard Club.

=== Cushman Awards ===
The Cushman Award for Lifetime Achievement in the Theatre was inaugurated in 1957 as a tribute to a distinguished contributor to the vitality of the theatre. Shirley Booth was the first recipient, followed by stage luminaries: Richard Burton, Zoe Caldwell, Carol Channing, Jose Ferrer, Henry Fonda, Julie Harris, Helen Hayes, Katharine Hepburn, Mary Martin, Robert Morse, Ginger Rogers, and others, all of whom visited the club for post-curtain parties.

From 1995 on, the Charlotte Cushman Award for Outstanding Leading Actress in a Play was presented at the Philadelphia Theatre Alliance Barrymore Awards ceremony, a tradition continued by the Foundation. Zoe Caldwell was the first recipient for her starring role in Terrence McNally’s Master Class, which premiered at the Philadelphia Theatre Company at the Plays and Players Theatre, before going on to New York.

=== Closing of the Cushman Club ===
On June 3, 1999, the Cushman Club's fifteen member board, headed by president Annette Linck, voted to close the Charlotte Cushman Club. The club had "outlived its original residential and educational purposes". The board chose to redefine its mission so as to "enhance and better support a variety of theatre programs".

The club building on Camac Street was sold as of 2001. Since restored, the Cushman Building has been granted a preservation easement by the Preservation Alliance of Philadelphia, to protect the exterior and parts of the interior. The Eleanor Wescott Library of rare theatre memorabilia and books had been housed in the club. Artwork in the collection included framed Hogarth prints; a portrait and a marble bust of Charlotte Cushman; and portraits of Fanny Brice, Edwin Forrest and Ellen Terry. Two toy theaters were also included, one by Charles Boucher of the Academy of Music, who incorporated recognizable details of the academy into the model. Much of the Wescott collection was dispersed to appropriate institutions, including the University of Pennsylvania, the Free Library and the archives of the Academy of Music. Other items including Fanny Brice's grand piano were sold at auction. In addition, the Cushman Club Conference Room was established in the University of the Arts Tara Building, for the Dean of the Theatre Department. Cushman Club memorabilia is exhibited in the Cushman Conference Room; and in the department's lobby gallery. The Club archives are housed in the University Of Pennsylvania Van Pelt Library.

== Charlotte Cushman Foundation ==
The Charlotte Cushman Foundation was founded in the year 2000 by the officers of the Charlotte Cushman Club and Library. Funds from the sale of the Cushman building and its contents were added to the existing endowment from the Charlotte Cushman Club, forming a basis for making grants. As of 2014, Cushman has made grants totaling almost $600,000.

All CCF Trustees are women, as were the officers of the Cushman Club before them. Two of the Cushman Club officers, Cirel Magen and Audrey Walters, remain active as CCF Trustees. The first president of the Foundation was Donna Thomas;^{[22]} the second was Jeanne Wrobleski;^{[23]} the third was Cirel Magen; followed by Geraldine Duclow, Kathleen Stephenson and Therese Willis. Mailing address of foundation is 320 South Broad Street, Room 120, Philadelphia, Pa, 19102.

== Assets ==
As of 2017 the Charlotte Cushman Foundation had assets of $567,031

=== Funding details ===
Funding details as of 2017:
Revenue and support as of 2017: $36,937
1. Dividends, interest from securities (53.1%)
2. Other income (46.9%)
3. temporary cash investments (0.04%)
Expenses as of 2017: $81,510
1. Contributions, gifts, grants (80.5%)
2. Other expenses (17.2%)
3. Accounting fees (2.30%)
