= Michael Duffield =

English-born actor who worked in Australia (1915–1986)

- Born: 20 January 1915; Reading, Berkshire, England
- Died: 16 June 1986 (aged 71); Toorak, Victoria, Australia
- Occupation: Actor
- Years active: 1939–1986

Michael Duffield (20 January 1915 – 16 June 1986) was an English-born character actor who worked in Australia for many decades.

== Career ==
Duffield's first acting role was in the 1939 television play French Without Tears, playing the part of Lieutenant Commander Rogers. He appeared in over 50 onscreen roles, including further televised live plays.

He was also a prominent theatre actor, his stage career beginning in 1950, in numerous productions with the Melbourne Theatre Company. He won awards in 1962 for his performance on stage in The Caretaker and also was notable for playing Winston Churchill in the production The Soldiers.

He was nominated for the 1979 AACTA Award for Best Actor in a Supporting Role for his role as Methuselah in The Last of the Knucklemen, a role he reprised from the original stage production.

== Death ==
Duffield died in June 1986, aged 71 and was survived by a wife and three children.

== Filmography ==
=== Film ===
Year	Title	Role	Notes
1955	Dial 999	Fingerprint Man (uncredited)	
1957	Bullet from the Past	Fingerprint Expert	Short film
1957	Rock You Sinners	Paul Selway	
1969	Two Thousand Weeks	Will's father	
1971	Stork	Judge	
1977	The Last Wave	Andrew Potter	
1979	The Last of the Knucklemen	Methuselah	
1986	Departure	Presley Swift	

=== Television ===
Year	Title	Role	Notes
1939	French Without Tears	Lieutenant Commander Rogers	TV play
1956	The Gordon Honour	Guide	Season 2, episode 1: "The Prisoner's Candlestick"
1957	Bonehead	George	Pilot episode
1958	Emergency Ward 10	George Henderson	Season 1, episode 46
1956–1958	ITV Television Playhouse	Phillip Cook / Cody / Chief Petty Officer Thompson	3 episodes
1959	Probation Officer	Maxwell	Season 1, episode 4
1961	Night of the Ding-Dong	Colonel Beauchamp	TV play
1961	Quiet Night	Doctor Clayton	TV play
1961	Two-Headed Eagle	Felix Von Willenstein	TV play
1962	Fury in Petticoats	Reverend William Dill	TV play
1962	Suspect	Dr Rendle	TV play
1962	Fly by Night	Mr Dexter	TV play
1962	The Music Upstairs		TV play
1963	The White Carnation	John Greenwood the ghost	TV play
1963	Barnstable	Reverend Wandsworth Tester	TV play
1963	The Prisoner	The Prisoner	TV play
1964	On Approval	Richard	TV play
1964	Barley Charlie	Inspector	Season 1, episode 4: "The Inspector Calls"
1964	Corruption in the Palace of Justice	Chief Judge Cross	TV play
1964	Luther	Staupitz	TV play
1964	A Provincial Lady	Alexi Stupendev	TV play
1964	Otherwise Engaged	Henry Williamson	TV play
1965	Macbeth	Seyton	TV play
1965	Photo Finish	The Father	TV play
1965	Campaign for One		TV play
1968	Shadow on the Wall	Sam Ho	TV play
1968	Salome	Capradocian	TV play
1968	Cobwebs in Concrete	Sir Miles Parker	TV play
1969	The Cheerful Cuckold	Professor Garraway	TV play (episode of Australian Plays)
1972	I’m Damned if I Know		TV play
1974	This Love Affair	Birdey Wilson	Anthology series
1974	Out of Love		Anthology miniseries
1971–1975	Matlock Police	6 roles	6 episodes
1975	Cash and Company	PJ Clarke	Miniseries, episode 8: "A P.J. Clarke Original"
1971–1975	Division 4	9 roles	9 episodes
1969 –1976	Homicide	12 roles	12 episodes
1976	Power Without Glory	Jock McNeil / Magistrate	2 episodes
1977	Bluey	Harry Silverman	Episode 28: "The Hydra"
1978	Chopper Squad	Captain	Season 1, episode 10: "J Is for Julie"
1978	Catspaw	Barton	
1979	Skyways	Sir Joseph Miles / Sir Godfrey Fox	Season 1, 9 episodes
1980	Lucinda Brayford	Arthur Brayford	Miniseries, episode 1: "The shoulder-knots of livery"
1979–1980	Prisoner	Charles Baldwin	Seasons 1–2, 7 episodes
1981	And Here Comes Bucknuckle	Colonel Aubrey Mannix	Miniseries, 6 episodes
1978–1981	Cop Shop	Albie Hinch / Digby / Dr. Penhurst	4 episodes
1978–1981	The Sullivans	Arthur Johnson / Judge	9 episodes
1982	Deadline	Air Vice Marshall	TV movie
1982	Sara Dane	Governor Bligh	Miniseries, episode 7
1982	Women of the Sun	Muller	Miniseries, episode 2: "Maydina, the Shadow"
1984	Special Squad	Fulcher	Episode 41: "Mad Mountain Momma"
1983–1984	Carson's Law	Harry Armstrong / Judge / Doctor	6 episodes
1985	Robbery Under Arms	Mr Falkland	TV movie
1986	The Anniversary	Wilbur	TV movie

== Theatre ==
Year	Title	Role	Notes
1940	The Distaff Side	Toby Chegwidden	Garrick Playhouse, Altrincham
1940	The Ship	George Norwood	Garrick Playhouse, Altrincham
1941	The Ringer	John Lenley	Garrick Playhouse, Altrincham
1941	Eight Bells	Collister (2nd Mate)	Garrick Playhouse, Altrincham
1941	The Brontes of Haworth Parsonage	Branwell Bronte	Garrick Playhouse, Altrincham
1944	Happy Few		Grand Theatre & Opera House, Leeds, Cambridge Theatre, London
1944	This Was a Woman	Terry	Theatre Royal, Bath, Coliseum Theatre, Harrow, Theatre Royal, Brighton, Prince's Theatre, Bradford, Hull New Theatre, Hippodrome Theatre, Preston, Pavilion Theatre, Torquay, Morecambe Winter Gardens, Prince of Wales Theatre, Cardiff
1944	See How They Run	The Intruder	Comedy Theatre, London, Q Theatre, London
1950	The Girl Who Couldn't Quite		Palace Theatre, Sydney
1950	Is Your Honeymoon Really Necessary?		Princess Theatre, Melbourne
1950	The Light of Heart		National Theatre, Melbourne
1951	National Theatre Festival of the Arts 1951: Season Five		Princess Theatre, Melbourne
1951	Deadlock	Dr Henderson	Princess Theatre, Melbourne, Theatre Royal, Hobart
1951	Worm's Eye View		Crystal Theatre, Broken Hill with Ronald Fortt Productions
1953	For Better for Worse		Theatre Royal Sydney with J. C. Williamson's
1954	Angelina Pantaloon	Walter Grundy Slazzard	Q Theatre, London
1954	Time on Their Hands	Bill Jones	Q Theatre, London
1954	The Green Bay Tree		Q Theatre, London
1955	The Thursday Habit	Dr Lang	Q Theatre, London
1956	The End Begins	Sergeant Marks	Q Theatre, London
1957	It's the Geography That Counts	Parker	Royal Court Theatre, Liverpool, Lyceum Theatre, Edinburgh, King's Theatre, Glasgow, Grand Theatre, Blackpool, St James's Theatre, London
1960	Visit to a Small Planet	Kreton	University of Melbourne with AET Trust
1961	The Dumb Waiter / The Room		Russell Street Theatre, Melbourne
1961	The Importance of Being Earnest	John Worthing	University of Melbourne with AET Trust
1961	The Caretaker		Russell Street Theatre, Melbourne
1962	The Shifting Heart	Poppa Bianchi	Russell Street Theatre, Melbourne with AET Trust
1962	You Never Can Tell	The Waiter	University of Melbourne with AET Trust
1962	The Season at Sarsaparilla	Clive Pogson	University of Melbourne with AET Trust
1963	Richard II		University of Melbourne with AET Trust
1963	The Man Who Came to Dinner	Mr Stanley	Russell Street Theatre, Melbourne with AET Trust
1963	Goodnight Mrs. Puffin	Henry Fordyee	Comedy Theatre, Melbourne with J. C. Williamson's
1963	The Brides of March	Ken Scudamore	St Martins Theatre, Melbourne
1964	Hamlet	Fransisco, Player, Fortinbras	University of Melbourne, Russell Street Theatre, Melbourne with AET Trust
1964	Photo Finish	Sam at Sixty	University of Melbourne
1965	Poor Bitos	Bitos / Robespierre	St Martins Theatre, Melbourne
1965	Entertaining Mr Sloane		Russell Street Theatre, Melbourne with AET Trust
1965	But for Whom Charlie		St Martins Theatre, Melbourne
1965	Simple Spymen	Percy Pringle	St Martins Theatre, Melbourne
1966	The Representative		Russell Street Theatre, Melbourne with AET Trust
1966	War and Peace	Napoleon	Russell Street Theatre, Melbourne with AET Trust
1966	The Young Wife	Papadopilos	Russell Street Theatre, Melbourne with J. C. Williamson's
1966	The Royal Hunt of the Sun		Russell Street Theatre, Melbourne with AET Trust
1966	Private Yuk Objects		Russell Street Theatre, Melbourne, Phillip Street Theatre, Sydney with AET Trust
1967	The Devil’s Advocate	Monsignor Blaise Meredith	St Martins Theatre, Melbourne
1967	A Flea in Her Ear	Dr Finache	Russell Street Theatre, Melbourne, Canberra Theatre with AET Trust
1967	The Servant of Two Masters	Doctor Lombardi	Russell Street Theatre, Melbourne with AET Trust
1967	Incident at Vichy		Russell Street Theatre, Melbourne with AET Trust
1967	Moby Dick - Rehearsed	Old Pro / Pegleg / Carpenter	Russell Street Theatre, Melbourne with AET Trust
1967	The Heiress	Dr Austin Sloper	Russell Street Theatre, Melbourne with AET Trust
1967	Rhinoceros	The Logician	Russell Street Theatre, Melbourne with AET Trust
1967	Death of a Salesman	Charley	Russell Street Theatre, Melbourne with AET Trust
1968	The Magistrate		Russell Street Theatre, Melbourne, Canberra Theatre, Mildura Arts Centre, Broken Hill, King's Theatre, Mount Gambier, Adelaide Teachers College Theatre with MTC & AET Trust
1968	The Man in the Glass Booth		Russell Street Theatre, Melbourne with MTC & AET Trust
1968	The Crucible		Russell Street Theatre, Melbourne, Canberra Theatre, Tasmania with MTC & AET Trust
1968	Three Sisters	Chebutykin	Russell Street Theatre, Melbourne with MTC & AET Trust
1969	The Country Wife		Russell Street Theatre, Melbourne, Canberra Theatre with MTC & AET Trust
1969	The Soldiers	Winston Churchill	Russell Street Theatre, Melbourne, Canberra Theatre with MTC & AET Trust
1969	Six Characters in Search of an Author		Russell Street Theatre, Melbourne with MTC & AET Trust
1969	The Unknown Soldier and His Wife		Russell Street Theatre, Melbourne with MTC & AET Trust
1970	The Caucasian Chalk Circle	Georgi Abashvili	Russell Street Theatre, Melbourne with MTC & AET Trust
1970	Day of Glory		Russell Street Theatre, Melbourne with MTC & AET Trust
1970; 1971	All's Well That Ends Well	Duke of Florence	Princess Theatre, Melbourne, Canberra Theatre, Octagon Theatre, Perth with MTC & AET Trust
1970	Son of Man		Russell Street Theatre, Melbourne with MTC & AET Trust
1971	The Recruiting Officer		Russell Street Theatre, Melbourne with MTC & AET Trust
1971	The Trial of the Catonsville Nine		Russell Street Theatre, Melbourne with MTC & AET Trust
1972; 1973	The Cherry Orchard		Elizabethan Theatre, Sydney, Comedy Theatre, Melbourne, Playhouse, Perth, Canberra Theatre with MTC & AET Trust
1972	Tonight At 8.30: Shadow Play / Red Peppers / Family Album		Russell Street Theatre, Melbourne with MTC & AET Trust
1972	Danton’s Death		Russell Street Theatre, Melbourne with MTC & AET Trust
1972	Macquarie		Russell Street Theatre, Melbourne with MTC & AET Trust
1972	The Tavern		Russell Street Theatre, Melbourne with MTC & AET Trust
1973	An Ideal Husband	Vicomte de Nanjac	Playhouse, Perth with MTC
1973	Mother Courage		Princess Theatre, Melbourne with MTC & AET Trust
1973	Paying the Piper		Comedy Theatre, Melbourne with MTC & AET Trust
1973	Design for Living		St Martins Theatre, Melbourne with MTC & AET Trust
1973; 1974	The Last of the Knucklemen	Methuselah	Russell Street Theatre, Melbourne, Sydney Opera House, Playhouse, Canberra with MTC & AET Trust
1974	Ice Age		Prince Alfred College Hall, Adelaide with Theatre 62
1975	The Double Dealer		Russell Street Theatre, Melbourne with MTC
1975	The Lady from the Sea		St Martins Theatre, Melbourne with MTC
1975	The Freeway		Russell Street Theatre, Melbourne with MTC
1975	Thark		St Martins Theatre, Melbourne with MTC
1976	What the Butler Saw	Dr Rance	Monash University, Melbourne with The Alexander Theatre Company
1978	Oh / Let Me In	Surgeon / Fred	Playbox Theatre, Melbourne with Hoopla Theatre Foundation
1979	The Virgin: Miracles for Christmas		Playbox Theatre, Melbourne with Hoopla Theatre Foundation
1982	Sea Drift	Jason Richards	Playbox Theatre, Melbourne
1983	A Pair of Claws	Presley Swift	Melbourne Athenaeum with MTC

== Radio ==
Year	Title	Role	Notes
1953	His Excellency		2BL-NC-CN & 4QR-1 radio play
1962	The General Motors Hour	Dr Rendle	Episode: "Suspect"
1978	Kind Hearts and Coronets	Rev Lord Henry	ABC Radio Melbourne
1979	Lord Arthur Savile’s Crime	Dean of Chichester	ABC Radio Melbourne
1979	Cymbeline	Philario	ABC Radio Melbourne
