= Peter Collingwood =

Australian/British television actor (1920–2016)

- Born: Peter Trevor Collingwood; 6 May 1920; Kent, England
- Died: 23 September 2016 (aged 96)
- Education: Embassy Theatre, London
- Occupations: Actor, playwright
- Years active: 1938–2003
- Spouse: Margery Shaw (m. 1950)

Peter Trevor Collingwood (6 May 1920 – 23 September 2016) was an English-born actor who appeared in theatre roles, films, miniseries and serials from 1938 to 2003 in his native England and Australia. Collingwood was known for his portrayal of judges, military men and upper-crust befuddled types. He was also a playwright.

== Early life ==
Collingwood was born in Kent(some sources give, Farnham, Surrey), England on 6 May 1920. He initially studied at the Royal Naval College, Dartmouth. During the Second World War, he also served in the British Navy including on the Greek submarine Matrozos as liaison officer, but was discharged due to eyesight problems.

He enrolled in the Embassy School of Acting at the Embassy Theatre, London, in 1937. His first professional acting job was in Wang Shifu's Chinese play The Western Chamber at London's Torch Theatre in 1938.

== Career ==
=== Theatre ===
After the war, Collingwood joined Amersham Repertory Theatre, followed by the Young Vic Company, and a number of other companies. After marrying his wife, they moved to Perth, Scotland where he worked for the Perth Repertory Company. During this time, he wrote the farce Gathering Nuts, which was performed by the company, as well as by a number of other repertory companies.

In 1953, Collingwood returned to London with his family, where he worked regularly on stage (as well as in film and television).

In 1961, with his wife and step-son Michael, Collingwood travelled overland to Sri Lanka, then by ship to Perth, Australia. From late 1961 to 1963, he worked at the Perth Playhouse.

The family returned to England for two years, during which he appeared in a number of successful West End shows, including Inadmissible Evidence, Meals on Wheels, and I Love you Mrs Patterson.

In 1967, Collingwood emigrated to Australia, first living in Perth before settling near Sydney in Balmain, New South Wales. He worked for many Sydney theatre companies including the Old Tote, Nimrod Theatre, Belvoir Theatre Company, the Independent Theatre and Sydney Theatre Company. Between 1970 and 1972 he was Artistic Director of the Marian Street Theatre.

=== Television and film ===
Collingwood appeared in numerous serial roles, both dramatic and comedic, in the UK and Australia.

He played Lord John Russell in 1975 drama series Edward the Seventh.

His Australian roles included playing Mr. Dunkley in Are You Being Served? Governor Phillip in The Timeless Land, and a recurring guest role on Home and Away as Bert King, father to main character Pippa Ross, from 1995 to 1997.

He also made appearances in Phoenix Five, The Coral Island Homicide, Division 4, Mother and Son, A Country Practice, Police Rescue, All Saints and Always Greener.

Notable Australian film appearances include classic film Picnic at Hanging Rock (1975), Mad Dog Morgan (1976), Minnamurra (1989) and a minor part in Baz Luhrmann’s hit musical film Moulin Rouge! (2001).

== Personal life ==
In 1950 Collingwood married Margery Shaw, with whom he had daughter Julia. His stepsons were Christopher and Michael.

== Death ==
Collingwood retired in 2003 and died 23 September 2016 at the age of 96.

== Filmography ==
=== Film ===
Year	Title	Role	Type
1950	Spring-Heeled Jack	Denis Stocks	TV movie
1954	River Beat	Coroner	Feature film
1956	Sailor Beware!	Verger (uncredited)	Feature film
1958	Up the Creek	Chippy	Feature film
1958	Further Up the Creek	Chippy	Feature film
1959	Body Found	Collins	TV movie
1959	The Missing Mercury	Mr Jones	TV movie
1960	Follow That Horse!	Uncredited	Feature film
1960	Who Pays the Piper?		TV movie
1960	The Balloon and the Baron	Francis Giles	TV movie
1961	The Green Helmet	Charlie	Feature film
1961	Wings of Death	Harris	Short film
1961	The Train Set	Customer	TV movie
1963	The Rose and Crown	Edward Stone	TV movie
1966	Morgan – A Suitable Case for Treatment	Geoffrey	Feature film
1968	Volpone	Corvino	TV movie
1970	Adam's Woman	Chaplain	Feature film
1974	Between Wars	Judge	Feature film
1975	Picnic at Hanging Rock	Colonel Fitzhubert	Feature film
1975	Two Way Mirror	Sam Bellamy	TV movie
1976	Mad Dog Morgan	Judge Barry	Feature film
1976	Deathcheaters	Langham	Feature film
1978	The Night the Prowler	Dr Herborn	Feature film
1978	Magee and the Lady	Deveaux	TV movie
1981	The Killing of Angel Street	Government Minister	Feature film
1982	Crosstalk	Hollister	Feature film
1984	Fast Talking	School Principal	Feature film
1985	The Empty Beach	Fred Ward	Feature film
1985	Wills & Burke	Sir William Stawell	Feature film
1985	Burke & Wills	Doctor William Wills	Feature film
1987	Les Patterson Saves the World	Jeremy Williams	Feature film
1989	Minnamurra (aka Wrangler)	Banker	Feature film
1994	Cody: Bad Love	CJ Unwin	TV movie
1995	Billy's Holiday	Anna's Gentleman	Feature film
1997	The Ripper	Chalmers	TV movie
2001	Moulin Rouge!	Audience Member (uncredited)	Feature film

=== Television ===
Year	Title	Role	Type
1956	The Grove Family	1st Reporter	TV series, season 2, episode 22: "The Champion"
1956	My Husband and I	Jennings	TV series
1957	Little Lord Fauntleroy	Mr Wilkins, a groom	Miniseries, 2 episodes
1958	BBC Sunday Night Theatre	Hughie Gibson	TV series, season 9, episode 32: "The Shadow of Doubt"
1958	The Sky Larks	Harold Jones	TV series, episode 11: "Down in the Drink"
1958–1960	ITV Television Playhouse	George Poddy / Tom Cardwick / Addison / Steen	TV series, 4 episodes
1959	World Theatre	Magistrate's Clerk	Miniseries, episode 9: "The Silver Box"
1959	Dial 999	Janitor	TV series, season 1, episode 38: "Robbery with Violence"
1959	The Vise	Fenn	TV series, season 7, episode 5: "Murder with Make-Up"
1959	Glencannon	Sparks	TV series, 9 episodes
1960	The Little Ship	Dr Pietro	TV series, 6 episodes
1960	Inside Story	Mr Davies	TV series, episode 7: "Return to Base"
1960	Interpol Calling	Travel Agent	TV series, episode 34: "Eight Days Inclusive"
1960	Knight Errant Limited	Andy Forsyth / John Higgins	TV series, 2 episodes
1960	Boyd Q.C.	Mr Moate	TV series, season 4, episode 2: "Hell Hath No Fury"
1960	Bootsie and Snudge		TV series, season 1, episode 1: "Civvy Street"
1960	The Haunted House	Simo	Miniseries, episode 2: "Part 2"
1960	Fact and Fiction	Teacher	TV series, episode 2
1960	Theatre 70	Honore Malfont	TV series, episode 14: "To Death with Love"
1960–1961	No Hiding Place	Specialist / Mr Peebles	TV series, 2 episodes
1961	The Men from Room 13	Johnson	TV series, 2 episodes
1961	Rendezvous	Peter	TV series, episode 19: "The Road Between"
1961	Deadline Midnight	Barney Tutley	TV series, season 2, episode 9: "Doggo"
1957–1961	ITV Play of the Week	Tom Whittle / Mr Carewe	TV series, 2 episodes
1961	Drama 61-67	Jeweller	TV series, season 1, episode 14: "Drama '61: The Glove"
1961	The Pursuers	Carpenter / Joey Conrad	TV series, 2 episodes
1964	The Hidden Truth	Mr Frisby	TV series, episode 3: "Cross Examination"
1964	Emergency Ward 10	Mr Barker	TV series, 2 episodes
1964	Swizzlewick	Dr McCrag	TV series, 1 episode 10: "In for a Penny"
1964	The Count of Monte Cristo	Baron Dandré	TV series, episode 3: "The Abbé Faria"
1964	Thursday Theatre	William Gregson / Stanley Griffiths	TV series, 2 episodes
1965	Z Cars	Chipperfield	TV series, season 4, episode 26: "A Shame to Take the Money"
1965	The Sullavan Brothers	Jack Gibbon	TV series, season 2, episode 1: "The Corrupters"
1965	Volpone	Magistrate	TV series, episode 3
1966	Sergeant Cork	Belling	TV series, season 6, episode 15: "The Case of the Unpopular Judge"
1967	Love and War	Emperor	Miniseries, episode 4: "The Brass Butterfly"
1968	Contrabandits	Tom Keating	TV series, season 2, episode 15: "Double Entry"
1969	I've Married a Bachelor	Captain Makepeace	TV series, season 2, episode 4: "The Army Will Make a Man of You, Mrs. Malloy"
1969	The Rovers	Professor John Neary	TV series, episode 3: "The Long Cry of the Bunyip"
1969	Delta	Carpenter	TV series, episode 7: "There's a Lot of It About"
1970	Phoenix Five	Earth Space Controller	TV series, 26 episodes
1970	Division 4	District Inspector / Magistrate	TV series, 2 episodes
1969–1971	Homicide	Dr Finch / Rev Galbraith / Major Dymond	TV series, 3 episodes
1971	Mrs. Finnegan		TV series, episode 13: "Something Old, Something New"
1974	Three Men of the City	Charles Freeth	Miniseries, episode 3: "A Kind of Revenge"
1974	Out of Love		Miniseries, episode 1: "I Don't Want To Know"
1974	A Touch of Reverence		Miniseries
1974	Certain Women		TV series, 1 episode
1975	Scattergood: Friend of All		TV series, episode 3: "The Great Egg Cosy Disaster"
1975	Edward the Seventh	Lord John Russell	Miniseries, 2 episodes
1975	Ben Hall		Miniseries, 2 episodes
1975	The Company Men	Charles Freeth	Miniseries, 5 episodes
1976	Rush	Major Chivers	TV series, season 2, episode 2: "The Great Eastern Bubble"
1976	Luke's Kingdom	Governor	Miniseries, 2 episodes
1980	Are You Being Served?	Mr Dunkley	TV series, 7 episodes
1980	The Timeless Land	Governor Phillip	Miniseries, 2 episodes
1981	A Town Like Alice	Dr Kennedy	Miniseries, episode 3
1980–1982	Cop Shop	Bert Jenkins / Wilfred Perry	TV series, 2 episodes
1983	Coral Island	Reverend McNab	Miniseries, 3 episodes
1983	The Dismissal	Tun Abdul Razak	Miniseries, episode 3
1983	Carson's Law	Martin Brewster	TV series, 2 episodes
1983	Under Capricorn	Governor	Miniseries, 2 episodes
1984	Eureka Stockade	General Nickle	Miniseries, episode 2
1984	The Last Bastion	General Haining	Miniseries, 3 episodes
1985	Mother and Son	Bank Manager Shirley	TV series, season 2, episode 1: "The Money"
1983; 1992	A Country Practice	Gerald Wilkes / Teddy Turner	TV series, 3 episodes
1993	E Street	Bishop Harcourt	TV series, episode 382
1995	Police Rescue	Douglas	TV series, season 4, episode 5: "Guardian Angel"
1995	Echo Point	Mr Greenway	TV series, season 1, episode 68
1995–1997	Home and Away	Bert King	TV series, 35 episodes
1998	A Difficult Woman	Chris Fitzgerald	Miniseries, 3 episodes
2001	Escape of the Artful Dodger	Judge	TV series, episode 1: "Jack in the Box"
1998; 1999; 2002	All Saints	Lionel Macken / Harry Fellowes	TV series, 5 episodes
2002–2003	Always Greener	Dr Dalrymple	TV series, 6 episodes

== Theatre ==
=== As actor ===
Year	Title	Role	Type
1938	The Western Chamber		Torch Theatre, London
1947	The King Stag	Cigolotti / Peasant	Lyric Theatre (Hammersmith), London, Prince of Wales Theatre, Cardiff & other locations with Old Vic Trust & Young Vic Company
1947	The Winslow Boy	Desmond Curry	Cambridge Arts Theatre
1949	A Wind on the Heath		Bedford Theatre, Camden Town, London
1949	The Crooked Billet		Bedford Theatre, Camden Town, London
1954–1955	Peter Pan		Bristol Hippodrome
1955	The Shadow of Doubt		Saville Theatre, London
1955–1956	The Devil's Disciple		Bristol Hippodrome
1957	Olive Ogilvie	Herman	Lyceum Theatre, Edinburgh & Aldwych Theatre, London
1961	Serjeant Musgrave's Dance: an Un-historical Parable		University of Sydney
1962	The Caretaker		Playhouse, Perth with National Theatre Inc.
1962	Plaintiff in a Pretty Hat		Playhouse, Perth with National Theatre Inc.
1962	Gathering Nuts		Playhouse, Perth with National Theatre Inc.
1962	The Gazebo		Playhouse, Perth with National Theatre Inc.
1963	The Member of the Wedding	Royal Addams	Playhouse, Perth with National Theatre Inc.
1963	The Irregular Verb to Love	Felix Rankin	Playhouse, Perth with National Theatre Inc.
1963	The Amorous Prawn		Playhouse, Perth with National Theatre Inc.
1964	I Love You, Mrs. Patterson	Mr Baxter	St Martin's Theatre, London
1965	Inadmissible Evidence	Hudson (replacement)	Wyndham's Theatre, London with English Stage Company
1965	Meals on Wheels	Father	Royal Court Theatre, London with English Stage Company
1964	The Cat and the Canary	Roger Crosby	Playhouse, Perth with National Theatre Inc.
1966	Romeo and Juliet	Friar Laurence	New Fortune Theatre, Perth with Australian Elizabethan Theatre Trust for Festival of Perth
1966	Any Wednesday		Playhouse, Perth with National Theatre Inc.
1966	A Severed Head		Playhouse, Perth with National Theatre Inc.
1966	Altona	The Father	Playhouse, Canberra, UNSW Old Tote Theatre, Sydney, Russell Street Theatre, Melbourne, Playhouse, Perth with National Theatre Inc.
1966; 1973	Festival of Four Plays		South Australia
1967	The School for Scandal		UNSW Old Tote Theatre, Sydney
1967	The Devil's Advocate	Aurello, Bishop of Valenta	Playhouse, Perth with National Theatre Inc.
1968	King Lear / Childermas	Earl of Gloucester	UNSW Old Tote Theatre Company, Her Majesty's Theatre, Brisbane
1968	A Refined Look at Existence		UNSW with Old Tote Theatre Company
1968	This Old Man Comes Rolling Home		UNSW with Old Tote Theatre Company
1968	The Fire on the Snow	Wilson	UNSW with Old Tote Theatre Company
1968	At Least You Get Something Out of That	Captain Ah Rees	UNSW with Old Tote Theatre Company
1969	Six Characters in Search of an Author		Russell Street Theatre with MTC
1969	The Unknown Soldier and His Wife		Russell Street Theatre with MTC
1970	What the Butler Saw		Russell Street Theatre, Melbourne
1974	The Seagull		Nimrod Theatre, Sydney
1976	Coriolanus		Playhouse, Adelaide with South Australian Theatre Company for Adelaide Festival
1976	A Doll’s House	Dr Rank	Sydney Opera House with Old Tote Theatre Company
1977	The Alchemist	Lovewit	UNSW with Old Tote Theatre Company
1977	The Time Is Not Yet Ripe	Sir Henry Pillsbury	Sydney Opera House with Old Tote Theatre Company
1978	Widowers' Houses	Mr Sartorius	UNSW Old Tote Theatre, Sydney
1979	Romeo and Juliet	Capulet	Octagon Theatre, Perth, Nimrod Theatre, Sydney
1980	My Fair Lady	Col. Pickering	St George Leagues Club, Sydney, Twin Towns Services Club, Gold Coast, Port Macquarie RSL, Canberra Theatre with L.W. Productions
1980	Volpone	Sir Politic Wouldbe	Nimrod Theatre, Sydney
1981	Last Day in Woolloomooloo	Ted	Nimrod Theatre, Sydney
1982	The Importance of Being Earnest		Marian Street Theatre, Sydney, Newcastle Civic Theatre
1983	The Portage to San Cristobal of A.H.	Sir Evelyn / Nikolai / Dr Rothling / Avery	Sydney Opera House with STC
1984	The Boiling Frog		Nimrod Theatre, Sydney
1985	The Resistible Rise of Arturo Ui		Seymour Centre, Sydney with Nimrod Theatre Company
1985	Pride and Prejudice		Queensland Theatre
1986; 1987	Aren't We All?	Vicar	His Majesty's Theatre, Perth, Comedy Theatre, Melbourne, Her Majesty's Theatre, Sydney
1986	The Madras House		Sydney Opera House with STC
1986	The Seagull		Sydney Opera House with STC
1987	The Winslow Boy		Northside Theatre, Sydney
1988	Breaking the Code		Northside Theatre, Sydney
1989	Bedroom Farce		Glen Street Theatre, Sydney, Illawarra Performing Arts Centre, Riverside Theatres Parramatta, Laycock Street Theatre, Gosford
1989	The Marriage of Figaro	Donguzman Brid'oison	Wharf Theatre, Sydney with STC
1989	Lettice and Lovage	Mr Bardolph	Sydney Opera House, Playhouse, Melbourne, Playhouse, Adelaide, Princess Theatre, Launceston with STC & MTC
1990	No Sugar		Playhouse, Perth, Tandanya Theatre, Adelaide
1991	Rookery Nook		Marian Street Theatre, Sydney
1991	Mortlock		Peacock Theatre, Hobart with Zootango Theatre Company
1992	The Homecoming		Wharf Theatre, Sydney with STC
1992	Macbeth		Ensemble Theatre, Sydney
1993	Out of Order	The Waiter	Comedy Theatre, Melbourne, Regal Theatre, Perth, Her Majesty's Theatre, Adelaide
1993	The Visit		Sydney Opera House with STC
1994; 1995	Arcadia		Sydney Opera House, Playhouse, Adelaide, Theatre Royal, Hobart, His Majesty's Theatre, Perth with STC
2000	Fame - The Musical	Mr Sheinkopf	Star City, Sydney, Canberra Theatre, Lyric Theatre, Brisbane with Jacobsen Entertainment Group

=== As writer / director / producer ===
Year	Title	Role	Type
1962	The Heiress	Production Manager	Playhouse, Perth with National Theatre Inc.
1962	Waiting in the Wings	Director / Production Manager	Playhouse, Perth with National Theatre Inc.
1962	Plaintiff in a Pretty Hat	Director	Playhouse, Perth with National Theatre Inc.
1962	Gathering Nuts	Playwright / Producer	Playhouse, Perth with National Theatre Inc.
1963	The Member of the Wedding	Production Manager	Playhouse, Perth with National Theatre Inc.
1963	The Unexpected Guest	Director	Playhouse, Perth with National Theatre Inc.
1963	Edward, My Son	Director	Playhouse, Perth with National Theatre Inc.
1963	The Dumb Waiter	Director	Playhouse, Perth with National Theatre Inc.
1963	The Room	Director	Playhouse, Perth with National Theatre Inc.
1963	The Member of the Wedding	Production Manager	Playhouse, Perth with National Theatre Inc.
1968	In Confidence	Producer	AMP Theatrette, Sydney with Q Theatre Company
1968	The Dumb Waiter	Producer	AMP Theatrette, Sydney with Q Theatre Company
1968	Circus Adventure	Director	AMP Theatrette, Sydney with Q Theatre Company
1969	Surgery	Director	AMP Theatrette, Sydney with Q Theatre Company
1969	See the Pretty Lights	Director	AMP Theatrette, Sydney with Q Theatre Company
1969	Applicant	Director	AMP Theatrette, Sydney with Q Theatre Company
1969	The Conversion of the Anglo-Saxons	Director	AMP Theatrette, Sydney with Q Theatre Company
1969	Trouble in the Works	Director	AMP Theatrette, Sydney with Q Theatre Company
1969	Tell Tale	Director	AMP Theatrette, Sydney with Q Theatre Company
1970	The Contract Burial	Director	AMP Theatrette, Sydney with Q Theatre Company
1970	The Seagull	Director	Scott Theatre, Adelaide with South Australian Theatre Company for Adelaide Festival
1972	The Ghost Train	Director	Killara Community Theatre, Sydney
1976	The Shoemaker's Holiday	Director	Sydney Opera House
1977	The Magistrate	Director	Sydney Opera House with Old Tote Theatre Company for Sydney Festival
1977	Dr. Brain's Body	Director	UNSW Old Tote Theatre, Sydney
1977	The Ultimate Obscenity	Director	UNSW Old Tote Theatre, Sydney
1977	The Time Is Not Yet Ripe	Director	Sydney Opera House with Old Tote Theatre Company
1978	The Cat and the Canary	Director	UNSW with Old Tote Theatre Company, Sydney
1978	Just Between Ourselves	Director	UNSW with Old Tote Theatre Company, Sydney
1978	Da	Director	UNSW with Old Tote Theatre Company
1978	The Knack	Director	UNSW Old Tote Theatre, Sydney
1982	The Importance of Being Earnest	Director	Marian Street Theatre, Sydney, Newcastle Civic Theatre
1983	The First Night of Pygmalion	Director	Phillip Street Theatre, Sydney, Townsville Civic Centre, Pilbeam Theatre, Rockhampton, Canberra Theatre, Queensland
1988	A Singular Voyage	Director / Adaptor	Wharf Theatre, Sydney for Sydney Festival
1991	Rookery Nook	Director	Marian Street Theatre, Sydney
1991	Mortlock	Playwright	Peacock Theatre, Hobart with Zootango Theatre Company
