= Face of a Man =

- Australian Plays episode
- Episode no.: Season 2 Episode 2
- Directed by: Eric Tayler
- Teleplay by: Richard Beynon
- Original air date: 28 June 1970
- Running time: 60 mins

Guest appearance
- John Meillon

Episode chronology
← Previous "Eden House"	Next → "Catalyst"

"Face of a Man" is an Australian TV play by Richard Benyon, best known for writing The Shifting Heart, who was living in England working as story editor on Z-Cars.

== Premise ==
A no-hoper steals a religious statue.

== Cast ==
- John Meillon as Wally Sillerish
- Lyndel Rowe as Ellen Sillerish

== Reception ==
The Canberra Times called it "extremely disappointing."
