= Shadow on the Wall =

Shadow(s) on the Wall may refer to:

== Film and television ==
- The Shadow on the Wall (1925 film), an American silent mystery film
- Shadow on the Wall (1950 film), an American psychological thriller film
- "Shadow on the Wall" (Wednesday Theatre), a 1968 Australian television play by Ru Pullan

== Music ==
- Shadows on the Wall, a 2002 album by Gordon Haskell
- Shadow on the Wall (song), a 1983 song by Mike Oldfield

== See also ==
- Allegory of the cave, a philosophical analogy originated by Plato
