= Richard Beynon =

Richard Beynon may refer to:

- Bynon, British-Canadian music producer and DJ
- Richard Beynon (writer) (1925–1999), Australian-born playwright, actor and television producer
