= Pat Bishop =

Australian actress (1946–2000)

- Born: Patricia Mary Bishop; 13 June 1946; Belfast, Northern Ireland
- Died: 28 March 2000 (aged 53); Melbourne, Victoria, Australia
- Occupation: Actress
- Spouse: Bill Hunter (m. 1976, divorced)
- Children: 1

Patricia Mary Bishop (13 June 1946 – 28 March 2000) was a northern Irish-born Australian actress, noted for her performances in theatre, film and television series.

== Early life ==
Bishop was born on 13 June 1946 in Belfast, Northern Ireland, to parents Lloyd and Dorothy and had two brothers, Ross and Howard.

== Career ==
Bishop appeared frequently on television, but is probably best known for her role in Prisoner as gangster's wife Antonia McNally, in 1979. She appeared in Dynasty in the regular role of Patricia Mason from 1970 to 1971. Other recurring roles included that of Melissa Hobson in Number 96 in 1976 and Maggie Gould in Cop Shop in 1980.

She appeared in the miniseries A Fortunate Life (1986), Edens Lost, Cassidy (both 1989), Come in Spinner, The Paper Man, Ring of Scorpio (all 1990), Brides of Christ (1991) and Bordertown (1995).

She also had guest roles in numerous television series including Contrabandits, Homicide, Delta, The Link Men, Division 4, Matlock Police, Catwalk, Spyforce, Ryan, Certain Women, Shannon's Mob, Spring & Fall, Menotti, Five Mile Creek, A Country Practice, Special Squad, Rafferty's Rules, The Flying Doctors, Boys from the Bush, Police Rescue, Law of the Land, Correlli, Water Rats, The Genie from Down Under, Bullpitt!, Blue Heelers and All Saints.

Bishop received an AACTA Award for Best Actress in a Leading Role for her representation of Jenny in the 1976 film Don's Party, based on the David Williamson play of the same name. She played the role of Maude White in the 1995 film Dad and Dave: On Our Selection, opposite Leo McKern, Geoffrey Rush and Noah Taylor, and was a nursing sister in the 1999 film Soft Fruit.

She also appeared in numerous TV plays and TV movies including Volpone (1968), The Voyage Out (1969), Tilley Landed On Our Shores (1969), Eden House (1970), Chimes at Midnight, Human Target (1974), A Step in the Right Direction (1981), Man of Letters (1984), Barracuda (1988), The Time Game (1992), Reprisal (1997) and Without Warning (1999).

Bishop acted extensively for the stage, including productions for NIDA, Old Tote Theatre Company, Ensemble Theatre, STC, MTC, QTC, Phillip Street Theatre, Belvoir and Hunter Valley Theatre Company.

== Personal life and death ==
Bishop was married to renowned Australian actor Bill Hunter in 1976, however, according to writer Bob Ellis, the marriage was short-lived after Hunter ran off with their wedding celebrant.

She had a daughter, Onagh.

Bishop died on 28 March 2000, aged 53, after a battle with cancer.

After Bishop's death, Onagh moved in with actress Fiona Spence and writer Denise Morgan in Sydney, who saw her through her HSC.

== Filmography ==
=== Film ===
Year	Title	Role	Notes
1976	Don's Party	Jenny	
1978	Cries from a Cold Aquarium	(undisclosed role)	Short
1980	The Quick Brown Fox	Miss Trent	Short
1986	Scorpion	Spain: Cab Driver	
1987	The Right Hand Man	(undisclosed role)	
1995	Dad and Dave: On Our Selection	Maude White	
1999	Soft Fruit	Nursing Sister	

=== Television ===
Year	Title	Role	Notes
1968	Volpone	Celia	TV movie
1968	Contrabandits	Hazel Reeves	Season 2, episode 15
1969–1972	Homicide	Rhonda	Season 6, episode 1
1969–1972	Homicide	Clair Neil	Season 9, episode 15
1969–1972	Homicide	Beverly Smith	Season 9, episode 31
1969	The Voyage Out	Kathy Harper	TV movie
1969	Tilley Landed On Our Shores	Miss... Er...	TV movie
1969	Delta	Mother	Season 1, episode 11
1970	The Link Men	(undisclosed role)	Season 1, episode 3
1970	Eden House	Portia	TV movie
1970	Chimes at Midnight	(undisclosed role)	TV movie
1970	Division 4	Lenise Bingham	Season 2, episode 7
1970	Division 4	Paula	Season 2, episode 29
1970–1971	Dynasty	Patricia Mason	Seasons 1–2, 22 episodes
1971	Matlock Police	Jocelyn	Season 1, episode 41
1972	Catwalk	Peggy Ellis	Season 1, episodes 8 & 12
1973	Spyforce	Island Woman	Season 1, episode 39
1973	Ryan	Elaine Duncan	Season 1, episode 20
1974	Human Target	(undisclosed role)	TV movie
1975	Certain Women	(undisclosed role)	TV series, 1 episode
1976	Shannon's Mob	Miss Warwick	Season 1, episode 13
1976	Number 96	Melissa Hobson	Season 5, 4 episodes
1979	Prisoner	Antonia 'Toni' McNally	Season 1, 8 episodes
1980	Cop Shop	Maggie Gould	4 episodes
1980	Spring & Fall	Psychologist	Season 1, episode 2
1981	Menotti	(undisclosed role)	Season 1, episodes 4 & 5
1981	A Step in the Right Direction	(undisclosed role)	TV movie
1982–1993	A Country Practice	Helen McNeil	Season 2, episodes 7 & 8
1982–1993	A Country Practice	Margot Reynolds	Season 4, episodes 39 & 40
1982–1993	A Country Practice	Pauline Kitchener	Season 5, episodes 51 & 52
1982–1993	A Country Practice	Janet Strauss	Season 13, episodes 21 & 22
1984	Five Mile Creek	Muriel Bostock	Season 1, episode 11
1984	Man of Letters	Ann Turtle	TV movie
1984	Special Squad	Barbara Prowse	Season 1, episode 16
1986	A Fortunate Life	Alice McCall	Miniseries, 2 episodes
1988	Barracuda	Sgt. Whitten	TV movie
1988	Rafferty's Rules	Mrs. Annie Hartnoll	Season 4, episode 13
1989	Edens Lost	Muffet	Miniseries
1989	Cassidy	Clare Cassidy	Miniseries
1990	Come in Spinner	Mrs. D'Arcy-Twining	Miniseries, 4 episodes
1990	The Paper Man	Marjorie Stack	Miniseries, 4 episodes
1990	The Flying Doctors	Evelyn Murray	Season 7, episode 20
1991	Boys from the Bush	Grace	Season 1, episode 9
1991	Police Rescue	Cath Adams	Season 1, episodes 6 & 10
1991	Ring of Scorpio	Beth Rogers	Miniseries, 4 episodes
1991	Brides of Christ	Mary Maloney	Miniseries, 2 episodes
1992	The Time Game	Gran Johnson	TV movie
1994	Law of the Land	Sharon Jobling	1 episode
1995	Correlli	Sister Margaret	Season 1, episode 9
1995	Bordertown	Cora	Miniseries, 2 episodes
1996	Water Rats	Miranda Lathem	Season 1, episode 15
1996	The Genie from Down Under	Madge	Season 1, episode 5
1997	Bullpitt!	(undisclosed role)	Season 2, episode 11
1997	Reprisal	Edith	TV movie
1998	Blue Heelers	Andrea Dean	Season 5, episode 37
1999	All Saints	Hazel Masterton	Season 2, episode 19
1999	Without Warning	Cecile Bannerman	TV movie

== Theatre ==
Year	Title	Role	Notes
1965	The Glass Menagerie	Amanda Wingfield	UNSW, Old Tote Parade Theatre with NIDA
1966	The Schoolmistress	Jane Chipman / Mrs. Rankling	UNSW, Old Tote Parade Theatre
1966	No, No, Nanette	Chorister	Arts Theatre, Adelaide
1966	An Inevitable Happening	Madame	Wayside Theatre, Sydney with The Group Theatre
1966	The Maids	Madame	Wayside Theatre, Sydney with The Group Theatre
1967	Hedda Gabler		UNSW, Old Tote Theatre, Sydney
1968	This Old Man Comes Rolling Home	Julie Dockerty	UNSW, Old Tote Theatre, Sydney
1969	The Rise and Fall of Boronia Avenue		Jane St Theatre, Sydney
1969	Rooted	Sandy	Jane St Theatre, Sydney with NIDA
1971	Hoddel's Remarkable Handcart		UNSW, Old Tote Theatre, Sydney
1972	The Beaux’ Stratagem		Theatre 62, Adelaide
1972	An Awful Rose		Jane St Theatre, Sydney with NIDA
1972	Don's Party		Jane St Theatre, Sydney, UNSW, Old Tote Theatre, Sydney, Playhouse, Canberra
1973	The Bear		AMP Theatrette, Sydney with Q Theatre Company
1973	Ritual for Dolls		AMP Theatrette, Sydney with Q Theatre Company
1974	One Season's King		AMP Theatrette, Sydney with Q Theatre Company
1975	Down Under		Stables Theatre, Sydney with King O'Malley Theatre Company
1976	The Tatty Hollow Story	Jo	Stables Theatre, Sydney
1976	Are You Now Or Have You Ever Been?	Cheerleader / Lillian Hellman	Nimrod Theatre Company, Sydney
1976–1977	Otherwise Engaged	Davina Saunders	UNSW, Old Tote Parade Theatre, Sydney, SGIO Theatre, Brisbane
1977	What the Butler Saw	Mrs Prentice	Hunter Valley Theatre Company, Sydney
1977	Sporting Double – The Les Darcy Show / The Roy Murphy Show	Margaret Darcy / Sharon	Hunter Valley Theatre Company, Sydney
1977	Hamlet	Gertrude	Hunter Valley Theatre Company, Sydney
1977	Confusions		SGIO Theatre, Brisbane, with QTC
1978	Dusa, Fish, Stas and Vi	Stas	Russell St Theatre, Melbourne, Playhouse, Perth, Union Hall, Adelaide, Theatre Royal Sydney with MTC
1978	The Homecoming	Ruth	Townsville Civic Theatre, Cairns Civic Theatre
1978	The Cherry Orchard	Charlotta Ivanovna	SGIO Theatre, Brisbane, with QTC
1979	A Cheery Soul	Mrs Custance / Miss Ferry / Little Girl	Sydney Opera House with The Paris Company & STC
1979	Hedda Gabler	Hedda Tesman	SGIO Theatre, Brisbane, with QTC
1980	Quadraphenia	Mary	Malthouse Theatre, Melbourne with Playbox Theatre
1980	Born in the Gardens	Queenie	Theatre Royal Sydney with MLC Theatre Royal Company & Knightsbridge Theatrical Productions
1981	Mourning Becomes Electra	Christine Mannon	Melbourne Athenaeum with MTC
1981	Sold in Marriage	Lady Henrietta Barrington	Sydney Theatre Music Hall Theatre Restaurant
1982	Conundra		Phillip St Theatre, Sydney, with Ensemble Theatre
1982	Macbeth		Sydney Opera House with STC
1987	Shadowland		Bay St Theatre, Sydney
1988	Hate	Eloise	Belvoir St Theatre, Sydney, Malthouse Theatre, Melbourne with Company B & Playbox Theatre
1990	Faith Healer		Crossroads Theatre, Sydney
1991	The Revenger's Tragedy		Sydney Opera House with STC
1991	Diving for Pearls		Belvoir St Theatre, Sydney, with Company B
1991	The Girl Who Saw Everything	Liz Ransome	Russell St Theatre, Melbourne, with MTC
1992	Mary Lives	Various roles	Malthouse Theatre, Melbourne with Playbox Theatre Company, Monash University, Geelong Arts Centre
1993	Angels in America Part 1: Millennium Approaches	Hannah Porter Pitt / Ethel Rosenberg	Russell St Theatre, Melbourne, with MTC
1997	Dimetos		Stables Theatre, Sydney with Productions en Attendant
1997	The Memory of Water		Marian St Theatre, Sydney, with Northside Theatre Company

== Radio ==
Year	Title	Role	Notes
1979	Mrs. Warren's Profession	Mrs Warren	ABC Radio Brisbane
1979	Thérèse Raquin	Thérèse	ABC Radio Melbourne

== Awards ==
Year	Title	Award	Category	Result
1977	Don's Party	Australian Film Institute Awards	Best Actress in a Leading Role	Won
1991	The Paper Man	Australian Film Institute Awards	Best Lead Actress in a Television Drama	Nominated
