= Ritual (Australian Plays) =

- Australian Plays episode
- Episode no.: Season 2 Episode 4
- Teleplay by: Alan Hopgood
- Original air date: 12 July 1970
- Running time: 60 mins

Episode chronology
| ← Previous "Catalyst" | Next → "The Juggler" |

"Ritual" is a 1970 Australian television plays. It was called "a tale of terror for two characters".

== Cast ==
- John Norman
- Lyndel Rowe

== Reception ==
The Canberra Times called it "disappointing".
