= Hot Ice =

Hot ice may refer to:

- Hot Ice (1952 film), a British comedy crime film directed by Kenneth Hume
- Hot Ice (1955 film), a 1955 comedy film featuring The Three Stooges
- Hot Ice (1987 film), a 1987 Australian film about a private detective
- Hot Ice Show, a long-running ice show located in England
- "Hot Ice" Hilda, a character in the anime/manga series, Outlaw Star
- Sodium acetate, a salt commonly used in a supersaturated solution with water to produce heat and salt crystals, which resemble ice

== See also ==
- Phases of ice
- Mpemba effect, an assertion that hotter water freezes faster
