= John Croyston =

Australian writer, radio producer and director (1933–2007)

- Born: 7 March 1933; Enfield, New South Wales, Australia
- Died: 23 May 2007 (aged 74); Greenwich, New South Wales, Australia
- Education: University of Sydney
- Occupations: Writer, producer, director

John Croyston (7 March 1933 – 23 May 2007) was an Australian writer, radio producer and director.

Born in the Sydney suburb of Enfield on 7 March 1933, Croyston moved with his family to the Georges River following the outbreak of WWII. He completed his secondary education at Hurlstone Agricultural High School, then studied at the University of Sydney. He worked as a teacher before going on to work at the ABC. He was a radio producer at the ABC from 1958 to 1964. He then moved into television.

Croyston died in Greenwich, New South Wales on 23 May 2007.

== Select credits ==
- The Quiet Season (1965) - producer
- The Runaway (1966) - writer
- The Man Who Saw It (1966)
- The Schoolmistress (1967) - writer
- A Touch of Gold (1967) - writer
- Love and War (1967) - producer - also wrote the play "Construction"
- The Cell (1968)
- Volpone (1968) - director
- The Queen's Bishop (1968) - director
- Contrabandits (1968) - director
- Australian Plays (1969) - producer, also wrote the episode "A Voyage Out"
- A Voyage Out (1969) - writer
- Tilley Landed on Our Shores (1969) - director
- Chimes at Midnight (1970) - writer
- Lane End (1972) -director
- Over There (1972) - director
- Certain Women (1973) - director
- Spoiled (1974) - director
- I'm Here, Darlings! (1975) - writer
- Behind the Legend (1975) - director
- The Seven Ages of Man (1975) - director
- Moynihan (1976) - producer
- Ride on Stranger (1979) - script editor
- Menotti (1980–81) - producer
- A Step in the Right Direction (1981) - producer
- Studio 86 (1986) - producer
