= Voyage Out =

- Australian Plays episode
- Episode no.: Season 1 Episode 2
- Directed by: John Croyston
- Teleplay by: John Croyston
- Original air date: 5 November 1969
- Running time: 70 mins

Episode chronology
← Previous "Dynasty"	Next → "The Cheerful Cuckold"

"Voyage Out" is a 1969 Australian TV play. It aired as part of the Australian Plays anthology series on the ABC.

Australian TV drama was relatively rare at the time.

== Premise ==
A woman, Kathy, decides to reject a series of fleeting physical encounters and believes she has found her ideal mate in Robert, a poet. Robert cannot believe he has the power to hold her and they both strive to convince themselves and everyone else that they are happy.

She discovers her husband Robert is dead.

== Cast ==
- Pat Bishop as Kathy Harper
- Ray Hartley as Robert Harper
- Alistair Duncan as Eddy
- Margo Lee as Tessa
- Jeff Kevin as Peter
- Don Crosby as Jack

== Reception ==
The Canberra Times thought Croyston's "sympathetic direction saved the play and gave it something it otherwise lacked. On the other hand perhaps a director without the bond of authorship could have been more ruthless and speeded it up. The story was unsubtle, rather melodramatic. It did have some surprisingly perceptive and original moments, however, such as when Kathy discovers Robert with his head in the gas oven and in her shock begins to beat his dead body calling him a "revolting little man". Food for thought: had she always hated him? The most important thing is that the plays are being televised. If they are not BBC standard at least they are getting an airing."

Reviewing the year in Australian TV, The Age said the six plays of Australian Plays were "more dull than bad with the exception of "A Voyage Out" notable for the TV debut of the diminutive Ray Hartley who played child parts in radio series."
