= Spring-heeled Jack (disambiguation) =

Spring-heeled Jack (also Springheel Jack, Spring-heel'd Jack, etc.) is a Victorian character, notorious for his frightening leaps.

Spring-heeled Jack may also refer to:

== Fictional entities ==
- Springheel Jack, a minor villain in the WB animated series Jackie Chan Adventures
- Springheel Jack, a serial killer central to the plot of the Stephen King short story "Strawberry Spring"

== Literature and comics ==
- Spring-Heeled Jack (play), a 1950 British play by Geoffrey Carlile
- Springheeled Jack (comics), a comic based on the figure from folklore
- Spring-Heeled Jack (1989), a children's novel by Philip Pullman

== Music ==
- Spring Heel Jack, an English electronic music group
- Spring Heeled Jack (band), a third-wave American ska band
- "Spring Heeled Jack", a track from the Lemon Demon album View-Monster

== See also ==
- The Curse of the Wraydons (1946), a 1946 British film featuring Spring-Heeled Jack
