= Seek and Destroy (TV series) =

Seek and Destroy is a short lived portmanteau series which aired on the ABC in 1968. It consisted of four BBC plays and one Australian play.

== Episodes ==
- "The Death of Socrates" - starring Leo McKern
- "The Quarry: Portrait of a Man as a Paralysed Artist"
- "The Arrangement" - opera based on Les Liaisons Dangereuses
- "The Cell" - the Australian play
- "After Many a Summer"
