= A Provincial Lady (film) =

- Based on: play by Ivan Turgenev
- Written by: Miles Malleson
- Directed by: Patrick Barton
- Country of origin: Australia
- Original language: English

Production
- Running time: 60 mins
- Production company: ABC

Original release
- Release: 2 September 1964 (Melbourne)

A Provincial Lady is a 1964 Australian television play.

== Plot ==
Daria, seeking to advance the career of husband Alexi, invites his employer to dinner. The Count is a childhood friend who was devoted to Daria.

== Cast ==
- Michael Duffield as Alexi Stupendev
- Beverley Dunn as Daria Stupendev
- Allan Bickford as Misha
- Keith Lee as Count Lubin
- Martin Magee as Apollo
- Louise Homfrey as Vasilvena
- William Lloyd as the secretary

== Reception ==
The TV critic for the Sydney Morning Herald thought "the air of leisurely introspection and nostalgia which can confidently be expected in any nineteenth-century Russian play... was only intermittently captured" in the production due in part to the acting and "the obviously contrived and stagey set" but "a certain charm kept coming out like the sun from behind clouds."
