= A Handful of Friends =

- Written by: David Williamson
- Original language: English

Premiere
- Date premiered: 20 May 1976
- Place premiered: The Playhouse, Adelaide with South Australian Theatre Company

A Handful of Friends is a 1976 play by Australian playwright, David Williamson.

== Background ==
The play was written for the South Australian Theatre Company and directed by associate director Rodney Fisher. It was Williamson's third play presented by the company and the second written especially for them.

== Synopsis ==
Set in Australia, Russell and his wife Wendy have recently returned from the US, to find that their director friend Mark has released a film in which his wife, Sally, plays a role. Mutual friends suspect that the film's characters are based on Russell (who is an alcoholic) and Wendy, and that they have been cruelly satirised. This ultimately triggers long-standing tensions and resentments, briefly culminating in violence, before reconciliation and the wisdom of hindsight occurs.

The play examines and exposes how easily an individual can take advantage of opportunism, in order to gain a sense of fulfilment through the character assassination of another.

== Characters ==
- Russell McAlister, a director who is an alcoholic
- Wendy McAlister, Russell's wife
- Jill McAlister, Russell's sister
- Mark Marshall, a filmmaker / director
- Sally Marshall, an actor / journalist and Mark's wife

== Productions ==
=== World premiere ===
The play had its world premiere at The Playhouse in Adelaide on 20 May 1976 and ran until 12 June 1976. It starred Neil Fitzpatrick, John Gaden, Julie Hamilton, Sandra MacGregor and Lyndel Rowe and was directed by Rodney Fisher. The costume designer was Anna French and the set was designed by Shaun Gurton. The production was funded via a grant from Australia Council for the Arts.

=== 1976–1977 productions ===
The production was staged immediately afterwards on 17 June 1976 at The Playhouse Theatre, in Perth with National Theatre Inc, starring Merrin Canning as Sally, Robert Faggetter as Russell, Mary Haire as Jill, Dennis Miller as Mark and Pippa Williamson as Wendy. From 31 August August to 30 October, the play was staged with the Melbourne Theatre Company at Russell Street Theatre. Julie Hamilton and Lyndel Rowe reprised their roles and were joined by Gerard Maguire, Tom Oliver and Kate Sheil. It then moved to Nimrod Theatre, in Sydney for Festival of Sydney 1977, from 12 November 1976 to 8 January 1977 and starred Peter Carroll as Russell McAlister, Judith Fisher as Wendy, Berys Marsh as Jill, Peter Sumner as Mark and Anna Volska as Sally. The play returned to The Playhouse, Perth in September 1977.

=== Later productions ===
It was staged three years later in Canberra and Adelaide, and then at La Boite Theatre, Brisbane in 1980. An overseas production was staged in China in 1983. It returned to Canberra in 1985. It later played at La Mama Theatre in Adelaide in 1992, followed by a production by National Institute of Dramatic Art (NIDA) in Sydney in 1993.

== Controversy ==
In a case of life imitating art, Williamson said in an interview with Quadrant magazine that he had based one of the characters on his wife, Kristin, and another on his then-friend Bob Ellis. Ellis complained about this in print, leading to a public argument between himself and Williamson, which became notorious.
