= Chimes at Midnight (Australian Plays) =

- Australian Plays episode
- Episode no.: Season 2 Episode 6
- Directed by: Eric Tayler
- Teleplay by: John Croyston
- Original air date: 26 July 1970

Episode chronology
← Previous "The Juggler"	Next → —

"Chimes at Midnight" is a 1970 Australian TV play by John Croyston which aired on the ABC. It was directed by Eric Tayler. It was the last in a series of TV plays on the ABC called Australian Plays and aired 26 July 1970.

== Plot ==
During World War Two, Chester, an American soldier on leave in Australia meets an Australian girl.

== Cast ==
- Robert Dunlap as Chester
- Pat Bishop
- Don Crosby
- Lynn Murphy
- Lyn Lee
- Judy McBurney

== Reception ==
The Canberra Times said it "was not a bad play, but it could be analysed out of existence. It did have some excellent moments, however."
