= The Prisoner (1963 film) =

- At from The Age 14 Nov 1962
- Written by: William Sterling
- Directed by: William Sterling
- Starring: Campbell Copelin
- Country of origin: Australia
- Original language: English

Production
- Production company: ABC

Original release
- Network: ABC
- Release: 14 November 1962 (Melbourne)
- Release: 1 May 1963

The Prisoner is a 1962 Australian television play based on a play which had been filmed with Alec Guinness. Many Australian TV dramas at the time were based on overseas stories.

== Cast ==
- Christopher Hill as the Interrogator
- Michael Duffield as the Prisoner
- John Gray as the Cell Warden

== Production ==
Sterling aimed to recreate prison through the mind of a prisoner.

== Reception ==
The critic from the Sydney Morning Herald wrote that, "no thumb-screw or rack could have seemed more incredible than did the weapons in the verbal armoury of the interrogator, played so as to be fairly obviously diabolical by Christopher Hill... The camera circled and shifted as ominously as the dialogue; the shadows and lights of William Sterling's production accentuated the probing nightmare; but in the end one was not quite sure how it all had happened."

The Bulletin thought it was "stronger than the motion picture in many ways."
