= Eden House (Australian Plays) =

- Australian Plays episode
- Episode no.: Season 2 Episode 1
- Directed by: Eric Tayler
- Teleplay by: Eric Tayler; Harold Landers
- Based on: Eden House by Hal Porter
- Original air date: 21 June 1970
- Running time: 70 mins

Episode chronology
← Previous "Fiends of the Family"	Next → "Face of a Man"

"Eden House" is a 1970 television play from the Australian television series Australian Plays, based on the 1969 play of the same name by Australian author Hal Porter. The play toured the UK in the 1970s with Jean Kent, and Dermot Walsh in leading roles. It was retitled 'Home on the Pigs back.'

== Plot ==
An aging actress, a widow called Maxine, is haunted by the memory of a son who drowned. Her stepson wants her property. She has a younger lover, Mark.

== Cast ==
- Margo Lee as Maxine
- John Bonney as Mark
- Pat Bishop as Portia
- Diana Davidson as Kate
- Lyn James as Honor
- Don Pascoe as Victor
- Philippa Baker as Helen
- Jeff Kevin as Bernie
- Judy McBurney

== Production ==
It was taped at the ABC Studios in Gore Hill Sydney on March 16 to March 19, 1970. Carl Schultz was one of the cameramen.
