= The Surfer (1986 film) =

- Directed by: Frank Shields
- Written by: David Marsh
- Based on: story by Frank Shields
- Starring: Gary Day; Gosia Dobrowolska
- Release date: 1986
- Running time: 90 minutes
- Country: Australia
- Language: English
- Budget: $1 million

The Surfer (also known as Death Wave) is a 1986 Australian film directed by Frank Shields and starring Gary Day and Gosia Dobrowolska. It was filmed in South-East Queensland.

== Plot ==
The screenplay concerns a beach bum whose best friend is murdered and who becomes involved in a cross country chase.

== Cast ==
- Gary Day as Sam Barlow
- Gosia Dobrowolska as Gina
- Rod Mullinar as Hagan
- Tony Barry as Calhoun
- Kris McQuade as Trish
- Gerard Maguire as Jack
- Stephen Leeder as Slaney

== Reception ==
The film was invited to screen at the Directors Fortnight segment of the 1987 Cannes Film Festival.

Reviewing for the Sydney Morning Herald David Stratton called it "a good, old-fashioned chase thriller", giving it a positive review but noting "the pacing isn't maintained throughout, and the music is sometimes inaptly used. But it is a rollicking good adventure yarn, made by a film-maker who knows just what he's doing." Rob Lowing of the Sun-Herald gave it 2 1/2 stars and writes "The Surfer is a rough diamond of a film which still needs a little polishing here and there." The Canberra Times' Dougal Macdonald criticised the films "trite" dialogue, the "dumb" characters and the "absurd" plot and says "The Surfer is one to avoid unless you are a masochist who finds satisfaction in irrational cliches that are so over-the-top they end up being unintentionally funny."
