= Fiends of the Family =

- Australian Plays episode
- Episode no.: Season 1 Episode 6
- Directed by: Oscar Whitbread
- Teleplay by: Pat Flower
- Based on: novel by Pat Flower
- Original air date: 26 November 1969
- Running time: 70 mins.

Episode chronology
← Previous "The Torrents"	Next → "Eden House"

"Fiends of the Family" is a 1969 Australian television play. It was part of the Australian Plays series. Written by Pat Flower based on her 1966 novel, directed by Oscar Whitbread.

== Plot ==
In a lonely house in the suburbs, three middle-aged sisters are repressed by their mother.

== Cast ==
- Ruth Cracknell as Maggie
- Betty Lucas
- Judith Fisher
- Moray Powell

== Production ==
The ABC bought the rights to the novel in November 1967.

== Reception ==
It won the 1970 Awgie for best script.
