= The Proposal and the Bear =

- Wednesday Theatre episode
- Episode no.: Season 4 Episode 17
- Directed by: James Davern
- Based on: The Marriage Proposal by Anton Chekhov; The Bear by Anton Chekhov
- Original air date: 24 April 1968
- Running time: 70 mins

Episode chronology
← Previous "Volpone"	Next → "Salome"

"The Proposal and the Bear" is a 1968 Australian television play, based on two stories by Anton Chekhov, The Marriage Proposal and The Bear. They were filmed in the ABC's Melbourne studios using the same cast for two plays.

== Plot ==
"The Bear" – a woman, although desperate for a husband, fights with her only suitor.
"The Proposal" – a widow is challenged to a duel by a rough farmer

== Cast ==
- Gerda Nicolson
- Terry Norris as Chubukov / Smirnov
- Dennis Olsen

== Reception ==
The newspaper, the Sydney Morning Herald said the show "required goodwill in the viewer to force the fun. It's not what-you do but the "verve with, which you do it — at least, in farce."
