= Tilley Landed On Our Shore =

- Australian Plays episode
- Episode no.: Season 1 Episode 4
- Directed by: John Croyston
- Teleplay by: Pat Flower
- Original air date: 12 November 1969
- Running time: 55 mins

Episode chronology
← Previous "The Cheerful Cuckold"	Next → "The Torrents"

"Tilley Landed On Our Shore" is a 1969 Australian television play. It was part of the Australian Plays series.

== Plot ==
A comic account of Governor Phillip's 1788 landing in Australia. It is set in modern day, on the mythical island of Extrania, where Lieutenant Tilley has been sent to establish a penal colony.

== Cast ==
- Donald MacDonald as Lieutenant Tilley
- Michael Boddy as Kosslin
- Frank Lloyd as Convict
- Tom Farley as PM
- David Cameron as Hippy
- Ric Hutton as Godwin
- Noel Ferrier as Stuckey
- Ruth Cracknell as Mrs Makespeace
- Don Crosby
- Barry Lovett as Grunch
- Lou Vernon
- Edward Howell as Cabinet Member
- Marion Johns as Lady
- Pat Bishop as Miss... Er...
- Jack Allan as Mr Makespeace
- Tony Bazell as Cabinet Member
- Reg Collins as Governor
- John Gray as Convict
- Sheila Kennelly as Convict
- Colonel Crint and His Regiment of Foot and Mouth Deserters

== Production ==
Before the production aired, the script won the 1967 Dame Mary Gilmore Medal, awarded in March 1968. Judges called it "a superbly funny comment with a strong Australian history allegory on present attitudes to domestic and foreign affairs. A rare dramatic event – a satirical script. It has style in the best sense of the word. It hides unexpected social comment beneath well-constructed fun. The humour is visual as well as verbal, the TV medium is an integral part of its being."

It was the first self contained drama by the ABC to be shot entirely on film with no videotaped segments. More than thirty people were in the cast and above-the-line costs were estimated to be somewhere between $15,000 and $20,000.

== Reception ==
The Sydney Morning Herald said "never have so many done so much for so little. It was a laboured hour of TV. There is only one word for it. Ouch." The same paper later called the production one of the worst shows of 1969.

The play has been re-appraised in later years. Academic Susan Lever wrote:

On my first viewing I was appalled by the slow pace and sheer crudity of this television offering. Its low budget is evident in every aspect, and every actor (with the exception of Ruth Cracknell and possibly Donald McDonald) milk every line for any possibility of humour. With further viewings, though, I find it clever and experimental—at least, it’s evidence that there was more than ‘naturalism’ on television in the early decades. At the same time, there’s not a trace of that ‘it could be you’ identification with the audience; nor any claims for documentary accuracy whatever... It’s clearly based in the tradition of satirical revue, but it is more sustained and serious than the sketch comedies that now constitute television’s version of that tradition.
