= Bullseye (1987 film) =

- Directed by: Carl Schultz
- Written by: Robert Wales; Bob Ellis (additional dialogue)
- Produced by: Brian Rosen
- Starring: Peter Murray
- Cinematography: Dean Semler
- Music by: Chris Neal
- Production company: PBL Productions
- Distributed by: Dumbarton Films; Umbrella Entertainment
- Release date: 8 May 1987 (US)
- Running time: 93 minutes
- Country: Australia
- Language: English
- Budget: A$4.5 million
- Box office: A$2,847 (Australia)

Bullseye is an Australian comedy adventure film directed by Carl Schultz.

The movie is also known as The Trailblazer, Trailblazer, Outback and Birdsville.

David Stratton called the film "visually handsome, beautifully directed and for the most part thoroughly entertaining... On any number of levels, including the charming lead performances, it's a thoroughly winning experience."

== Plot ==
The film is set in the 1860s and starts at a property at Emu Plains, near Roma, Queensland run by Don McKenzie and worked on by Harry Walford. Harry is in love with Lily Boyd, the McKenzie's maid.

Lily receives notice of an inheritance in Adelaide, and leaves. Harry decides to rustle some cattle with his friend Bluey McGurk; these include an expensive breeding bull.

Harry and Bluey drove the cattle through to Adelaide. They discover Lily has only inherited a small amount of money and is working in a brothel run by Mrs Gootch.

Harry is arrested and brought to trial. The alcoholic Samuel Merrit is hired as his defence counsel.

== Cast ==
- Paul Goddard as Harry Walford
- Kathryn Walker as Lily Boyd
- John Wood as Bluey McGurk
- Paul Chubb as Don Mckenzie
- Lynette Curran as Dora Mckenzie
- Bruce Spence as Purdy
- David Slingsby as Spence
- John Meillon as Merritt
- Kerry Walker as Mrs Gootch
- Rhys McConnochie as Judge
- Phillip Scott as Piano Player

== Production ==
Robert Wales' script was originally called Trailblazer. It was based on the cattle drive of Harry Readford, which inspired the novel Robbery Under Arms. PBL Productions, then an offshoot of the Nine Network, bought the script and at one stage Joan Long was going to produce with Peter Yeldham working on the script. Then Carl Schultz was hired as director and he wanted to turn it into a comedy, so Yeldham left the project. PBL formed a partnership with Dumbarton Films who had worldwide marketing rights to the film. Dumbarton was a subsidiary of Video Arts, a company owned by John Cleese.

Carl Schultz told an American journalist "it's the equivalent of your American western but with no blood. It's lots of fun." Schultz said an Australian jury found Harry Readford not guilty because "Australian's like the underdog." He added, "I'm taking a chance with this."

The two leads were inexperienced: Kathryn Walker was an architecture student doing some modelling who had only done school plays; Paul Goddard had only been in one small role. Schultz wanted these characters to play the action seriously while everyone else was larger than life.

Filming took place under the title Birdsville. The movie was shot on location in the Australian outback, with the town of Bourke, New South Wales standing in for Roma, and studio scenes shot at Mort Bay studios in Balmain, Sydney. Colonial era Adelaide was recreated in the Rocks, Sydney. Shooting finished on 14 November 1985.

== Release ==
Hoyts wanted to release the film but Dumbarton held up the release hoping for a major Hollywood distributor to handle the film in the same way as Crocodile Dundee. This did not occur - every major turned town the film and eventually Dumbarton ceased training. The film was not released until two years after it was made. It was not a financial success.

One critic wrote that "the film is entertaining in its contrived absurdity but lacks any substance behind the comic set ups." However David Stratton called the film "hugely entertaining".

The film was given a limited release in the U.S. on 8 May 1987. The Wichita Eagle called it "a charming, romantic, bawdy treat that romps along with earnest high spirits. The Los Angeles Times called it "a warmhearted adventure."

== Home media ==
Bullseye was released on DVD by Umbrella Entertainment in January 2011. The DVD is compatible with all region codes.
