= Robert Wales =

Scottish writer

Robert Wales (1924-1994) was a Scottish writer who worked for a number of years in Australia.

He born and educated in Scotland. Wales emigrated to Australia in 1947 and met his wife. He worked in various jobs such as manufacturing textiles. cattle-grazier and gold prospector. Wales worked for nine years as grazier near Walcha.

While on the land, Wales began writing. His stage plays include The Grotto, The Hobby Horse, and The Cell. He moved to Sydney in 1962.

Wales moved to London with his second wife in 1969. While there he wrote plays, television scripts and novels. He died of lung cancer in 1994.

== Select credits ==
- The Searchers (1961) - short story, read on radio in 1970
- Wings on the Morning (1962) - stage play - adapted for radio in 1962
- The Grotto (1962) – stage play and adapted for radio in 1963
- White Bird Passage (1962) - radio play
- The Cell (1966) – stage play – adapted for TV by the ABC in 1968
- Harry (1985) – novel - adapted into film Bullseye (1987)
