= Salome (Wednesday Theatre) =

- Wednesday Theatre episode
- Episode no.: Season 4 Episode 18
- Directed by: Oscar Whitbread
- Based on: Salome by Oscar Wilde
- Original air date: 1 May 1968
- Running time: 60 mins

Episode chronology
← Previous "The Proposal and the Bear"	Next → "Time Out of Mind"

"Salome" is a 1968 Australian TV play starring Frank Thring. It was based on the 1891 play of the same name by Oscar Wilde and was reportedly the first time that play had been adapted for television.

== Cast ==
- Frank Thring as Herod Antipas
- Buster Skeggs as Salome
- Fred Parslow as Jokanaan
- Monica Maughan as Herodias
- Michael Duffield as Capradocian
- David Foster as a young Syrian

== Production ==
Thring had performed in productions of the play on stage numerous times - indeed it was a performance of Salome in England in 1954 that established his reputation over there. Trevor Ling designed the production from drawings done by Aubrey Beardsley.

The production was announced in July 1967 and taped in December of that year.

== Reception ==
The Sydney Morning Herald said the production "did not make sense" in part because "of sexual passion and conflict there was no trace" saying Thring "was the only player to move and speak with conviction and control."

The Age said "it was more music hall than melodrama" with "Miss Skeggs was splendid" and "Thring's Herod had everything to recommend it."
