= The Juggler (Australian Plays) =

- Australian Plays episode
- Episode no.: Season 2 Episode 5
- Teleplay by: Peter Yeldham
- Original air date: 19 July 1970
- Running time: 70 mins

Episode chronology
← Previous "Ritual"	Next → "Chimes at Midnight"

"The Juggler" is a 1970 Australian television play about a movie producer. The ABC commissioned it from Yeldham, who was an Australian writer based in London at the time.

== Cast ==
- Terence Cooper
- John Meillon as a movie producer
- Sandy Gore
- Lyndel Rowe
