= Peter Sumner =

Australian actor (1942–2016)

- Sumner in Star Wars
- Born: Peter Malcolm Sumner-Potts; 29 January 1942; Waverley, New South Wales, Australia
- Died: 22 November 2016 (aged 74); Sydney, New South Wales, Australia
- Occupations: Actor; director; writer
- Years active: 1965–2015
- Spouse(s): Christina (divorced) Lynda Stoner (m. 1982)
- Children: 3

Peter Malcolm Sumner-Potts (29 January 1942 – 22 November 2016), professionally known as Peter Sumner, was an Australian actor, director, and writer. He had a long career in theatre, television, and film.

== Career ==
=== Acting ===
Initially a high-school teacher, Sumner made his professional acting debut in the 1965 television adaption of the novel My Brother Jack, followed by his film debut in 1966's They're a Weird Mob and his professional theatre debut in a 1967 production of Arthur Miller's Incident at Vichy.

Sumner was a presenter on the ABC youth show On the Inside from 1967 to 1968 while continuing to act, including starring in the Ensemble Theatre's 1968 production of Daphne in Cottage D. He then appeared in supporting roles in the films Color Me Dead (1969) and Ned Kelly (1970) before being cast as one of the leads of the successful television series Spyforce, which ran for 41 episodes from 1971 to 1973 and was shown around the world, including in Yugoslavia.

Sumner served as a presenter on Play School in 1974 while also starring in the miniseries A Touch of Reverence and appearing in guest roles in series including Homicide, Division 4, Matlock Police, Boney and The Sullivans.

In 1976 Sumner was on a European holiday when he arrived in London broke. His agent organised two days work on an American science fiction movie named Star Wars, filmed in Elstree Studios. Playing Death Star Officer Lieutenant Pol Treidum, Sumner had two lines, as well as controlling the Dianoga (garbage compactor monster) puppet.

Later film appearances included The Chant of Jimmie Blacksmith (1978), The Survivor (1981) and Bush Christmas (1983). On television he starred in Tickled Pink (1978–81) and, opposite Jacki Weaver, in the sitcom Trial By Marriage, portrayed Bill Hayden in The Dismissal and appeared in many Australian soap operas, including Cop Shop, Neighbours, E Street, The Flying Doctors, Home and Away, All the Way, Cluedo, Heartbreak High and Jeopardy.

=== Directing ===
Sumner was a follower of Meher Baba and directed a TV documentary, Baba's Birthday, shot in India, produced by Sensory Image, with music by Pete Townshend. The documentary follows Sumner's son, Luke Sumner, as he journeys to India in search of spiritual meaning.

Additionally, Sumner directed theatrical performances, including a season of Extremities for The Edge Theatre, Sydney, and wrote and directed the documentary Cradle of mankind.

In 1988 Sumner produced Australian theatrical posters 1825-1914, which accompanied an exhibition held at the Performing Arts Museum and the rights for his script Spiderdance, based on the life of Lola Montez, were secured by Indianic Pictures in 2021.

== Personal ==
The great grand-nephew of John Bird Sumner, Archbishop of Canterbury, Sumner was married twice. The first was to Christina, with whom he had two daughters; Kate and Joanna. Sumner married actor and activist Lynda Stoner on 30 December 1982 and their son Luke was born in 1984. Sumner and Stoner remained married until his death, aged 74, after a long illness.

== Film ==
=== As actor ===
| Year | Film | Role | Type |
|---|---|---|---|
| 1966 | They're a Weird Mob | Bit Part (uncredited) | Feature film |
| 1969 | Color Me Dead | Stanley Phillips | Feature film |
| 1970 | Ned Kelly | Tom Lloyd | Feature film |
| 1972 | The Lady and the Law | | TV movie |
| 1973 | And Millions Will Die | Dixie Hart | TV movie |
| 1974 | The Spiral Bureau | | TV movie |
| 1974 | Human Target | | TV movie |
| 1976 | McManus MPB | Sergeant McManus | TV movie |
| 1977 | Star Wars | Lieutenant Pol Treidum (uncredited) | Feature film |
| 1977 | Kiss and the Ride Ferry | | TV movie |
| 1978 | The Chant of Jimmie Blacksmith | Dowie Steed | Feature film |
| 1978 | The King of the Two Day Wonder | Jim Delaney | Feature film |
| 1979 | Middle Age Spread | Reg | Feature film |
| 1980 | Players in the Gallery | Simon Harris | TV movie |
| 1980 | The Department | Robby | TV movie |
| 1981 | Run, Rebecca, Run | Mr. Dimitros | Feature film |
| 1981 | The Survivor | Tewson | Feature film |
| 1983 | Bush Christmas | Ben Thompson | Feature film |
| 1984 | The Secret Discovery of Australia | George Collingridge | TV movie |
| 1986 | Shark's Paradise | Cooper | TV movie |
| 1986 | Army Wives | Grant's Father | Feature film |
| 1987 | Hot Ice | Joe Carpenter | TV movie |
| 1992 | Survive the Savage Sea | Buzz | TV movie |
| 1992 | Seeing Red | Gorman | Feature film |
| 1995 | The Eyes of Bangladesh | Narrator | Documentary |
| 1999 | The Dark Redemption | Lieutenant Pol Treidum | Short film - Star Wars fan film |
| 2001 | Mr Strehlow's Films | Narrator | Documentary |
| 2006 | Who Killed Dr Bogle and Mrs Chandler? | Legal Representative 2 | TV movie |
| 2011 | Ektopos | Zebediah | |
| 2012 | Ryder Country | Professor Ed Woodman | |
| 2015 | The Quarantine Hauntings | Dr. Henry Dickenson | Final film role |

=== As director and/or writer ===
| Year | Film | Role | Type |
|---|---|---|---|
| 1985 | Cradle of mankind | Writer and director | Documentary |

== Television ==
| Year | Film | Role | Type |
|---|---|---|---|
| 1965 | My Brother Jack | | Miniseries, 1 episode |
| 1967-68 | On the Inside | Presenter | |
| 1969, 1970 | Delta | Bill Keegan / Dr Brian Doyle | TV series, 2 episodes |
| 1970 | The Link Men | | TV series, season 2, episode 13: A Dress to Die For |
| 1970 | Dynasty | Jim Westlake | TV series, 1 episode |
| 1971-73 | Spyforce | Gunthar Haber | TV series, 41 episodes |
| 1972-73 | Over There | Lieutenant Allison | TV series, 4 episodes |
| 1973 | Boney | Sergeant Peter Fuller | TV series, 1 episode |
| 1973 | The Comedy Game | | TV series, 1 episode |
| 1973, 1974 | The Evil Touch | Richard | TV series, 2 episodes |
| 1973-74 | Certain Women | Carl Faber | TV series, 15 episodes |
| 1974 | Matlock Police | Dennis Reid | TV series, 1 episode |
| 1974 | Homicide | Kenny Sutton | TV series, 1 episode |
| 1974 | A Touch of Reverence | Rev. Alex Bartlett | Miniseries |
| 1974 | Silent Number | Ted Grant / Clifton | TV series, 2 episodes |
| 1974 | Play School | Presenter | TV series |
| 1975 | Division 4 | Ron Slater | TV series, 1 episode |
| 1975 | The Sullivans | | |
| 1976 | Luke's Kingdom | Karl Walthausen | Miniseries, 1 episode |
| 1976 | The Lost Islands | Christian Dobler | TV series, 2 episodes |
| 1977 | Bluey | Ronald Hamlin | TV series, 1 episode |
| 1977-83 | Cop Shop | Detective Tom Foster | TV series, 7 episodes |
| 1978 | Glenview High | Scott Brady | TV series, 2 episodes |
| 1978 | Catspaw | Flight Lieutenan Harry Sewell | TV series, 7 episodes |
| 1978, 1979 | Tickled Pink | Jason Jones / Bruce Jefferson | TV series, 2 episodes |
| 1979 | Skyways | Bob Cusack | TV series, 2 episodes |
| 1980 | Young Ramsay | Bob Marshall | TV series, 1 episode |
| 1980-82 | Trial by Marriage | Bruce Jefferson | TV series, 13 episodes |
| 1983 | The Dismissal | Treasurer Bill Hayden | Miniseries, 2 episodes |
| 1984 | Five Mile Creek | Lucas Morgan | 1 episode |
| 1984 | Special Squad | Nick Hardy | TV series, 1 episode |
| 1984 | Carson's Law | John Meadows | TV series, 2 episodes |
| 1984, 1992 | A Country Practice | Ray Lennox / Max Wellings / Dr Kenrich | TV series, 6 episodes |
| 1986, 1992 | The Flying Doctors | Harry Grant / Phil Buchanan | TV series, 2 episodes |
| 1988 | All the Way | Phillip Seymour | Miniseries, 3 episodes |
| 1989 | E Street | Jonathan Bromley | TV series, 10 episodes |
| 1989, 1995 | G.P. | Dr Vince Fisher / Rod | TV series, 4 episodes |
| 1990 | Neighbours | Ewan O'Brien | TV series, 6 episodes |
| 1991 | Hampton Court | Max | 1 episode |
| 1991 | Sex | Commercial voice | TV special |
| 1992 | Cluedo | Reverend Green | TV series, 21 episodes |
| 1995 | Spellbinder | Mr Kennett | TV series, 5 episodes |
| 1997-99 | Heartbreak High | Les Bailey | TV series, 36 episodes |
| 1998 | Moby Dick | Captain Gardiner | Miniseries, 1 episode |
| 1998 | Murder Call | Bette Fidler / Vic Bamford | TV series, season 2, episode 13: “A Dress to Die For” |
| 1998, 2001 | Water Rats | Carl Sexton / John Barnes | TV series, 2 episodes |
| 1999, 2008 | All Saints | Tom Grieve / Miles Bannock / Errol Baumann | TV series, 3 episodes |
| 2000 | Home and Away | Edward Dunglass Snr | TV series, 1 episode |
| 2001 | Outriders | Bud Sattler | 4 episodes |
| 2002 | Jeopardy | Arnie | TV series, episodes |
| 2002 | Blue Heelers | Joshua Grieves | TV series, 1 episode |
| 2002 | BackBerner | Professor Norman Twigg | TV series - 1 episode |
| 2003 | Snobs | Doctor | Miniseries, 1 episode |
| 2004 | Jessica | Rennie | Miniseries (2 part) |
| 2006 | Blue Water High | Teacher | TV series, 1 episode |
| 2007 | Baba's Birthday | Director | Documentary |
| 2014 | Rake | Archbishop Thomas | TV series, 1 episode |

== Stage ==
=== As actor ===
| Year | Title | Role | Venue |
|---|---|---|---|
| 1967 | Incident at Vichy | Monceau | Ensemble Theatre, Sydney |
| 1968 | Daphne in Cottage D | Joseph | Ensemble Theatre, Sydney |
| 1969 | The Real Inspector Hound | Birdboot | Ensemble Theatre, Sydney |
| 1969 | Postscript to a Promise | | Ensemble Theatre, Sydney |
| 1970 | Two for the Seesaw | Jerry Ryan | Killara Community Theatre Company, Sydney |
| 1972-73 | The Trial of Brer Rabbit | Brer Bear | Richbrooke Theatre, Sydney |
| 1975 | Chez Nous | | Old Tote Theatre Company, Parade Theatre |
| 1975 | The Importance of Being Earnest | | Old Tote Theatre Company, Sydney Opera House, Sydney |
| 1975 | Abelard and Heloise | Abelard | Old Tote Theatre Company, Sydney |
| 1976 | A Doll's House | Torvald Helmer | Old Tote Theatre Company, Sydney Opera House, Sydney |
| 1976 | A Handful of Friends | Mark Marshall | Nimrod Theatre Company, Sydney |
| 1980 | Celluloid Heroes | | Nimrod Theatre Company, Sydney |
| 1981 | Celluloid Heroes | | Theatre Royal, Sydney |
| 1984 | Taking Steps | | Ensemble Theatre, Sydney |
| 1990 | Rumors | | Comedy Theatre, Melbourne |
| 1993 | Hot Taps | | Riverside Theatres, Sydney |
| 2000 | Troilus and Cressida | Aeneas | Bell Shakespeare Company, Athenaeum Theatre, Melbourne, Sydney Opera House, Sydney and The Playhouse, Canberra |
| 2001 | The Tempest | Prospero | Bell Shakespeare Company |

=== As director ===
| Year | Title | Role | Type |
|---|---|---|---|
| 2002 | Good Sometime | Director | Newtown Theatre, Sydney |
| 2002 | The Truck | Director | Newtown Theatre, Sydney |
| 2003 | The Waiting Room | Director | Newtown Theatre, Sydney |
| 2003 | Extremities | Director | The Edge Theatre, Sydney |
