= The Torrents (Australian Plays) =

- Australian Plays episode
- Episode no.: Season 1 Episode 5
- Directed by: Oscar Whitbread
- Teleplay by: Oriel Gray
- Based on: The Torrents by Oriel Gray
- Original air date: 10 December 1969
- Running time: 70 mins

Episode chronology
← Previous "Tilley Landed On Our Shore"	Next → "Fiends of the Family"

"The Torrents" is a 1969 Australian TV play based on the stage play by Oriel Gray. It was filmed as part of the ABC anthology drama series Australian Plays. It was the second Gray play adapted by the ABC, after Burst of Summer. It aired on 10 December 1969 in Sydney and Melbourne.

Australian TV drama was relatively rare at the time.

== Cast ==
- Barbara Stephens as J.G. Milford
- Ken Shorter as Kingsley Myers
- Alan Hopgood
- Mark Albiston as Munro
- Harold Hopkins as Ben Torrents
- Lyndel Rowe as J.G. Milford
- Keith Lee as Rufus Torrents

== Production ==
It was shot in Melbourne and at Maldon, a small town outside Bendigo. It was designed by Alan Clarke. Railway carriages were hired from the Society of Railway Enthusiasts. The budget could not cover the hiring of an old locomotive so a modern one was used, but this was obscured by a fog machine.

== Reception ==
One critic called it "a beauty".
