= Barnstable (film) =

- The Age 7 August 1963
- Written by: James Saunders
- Directed by: William Sterling
- Country of origin: Australia
- Original language: English

Production
- Running time: 60 minutes
- Production company: ABC

Original release
- Release: 7 August 1963 (Melbourne)
- Release: 4 September 1963 (Sydney)

Barnstable is a 1963 Australian television play which had been performed on British TV. It was filmed in Melbourne. Sandra Power was the barrell girl from In Melbourne Tonight making her acting debut.

== Cast ==
- John Morgan as Charles Carboy
- Elizabeth Wing as Daphne, his wife
- Felicity Young as Helen Carboy
- Michael Duffield as Rev. Wandsworth Tester
- Sandra Power as Sandra, a maid

== Production ==
The play had been performed on British radio in 1959 and British television in 1962. William Sterling called it "a comic modern parable of serious intention. In content, it reflects the thinking of many intellectual writers in Europe."

== Reception ==
The TV critic for the Sydney Morning Herald wrote that "Blessed simplicity is the virtue of a parable, but in this production, strongly reminiscent in style of the first episode of a very dull science fiction serial, it was never clear whether the author... wanted an undercurrent of humour to his horror or an undercurrent of horror to his humour."

The Age wrote "it was difficult to known how to take the play."
