= Gerard Maguire =

Australian actor, producer and screenwriter

- Born: 25 September 1945 (age 81); Australia
- Occupations: Actor; producer; screenwriter; voice artist
- Spouse: Jane Alsobrook (1980–2021; her death)

Gerard Maguire (born 25 September 1945) also credited as Gerard McGuire, is an Australian actor, producer and screenwriter best known for his role in Prisoner as Deputy Governor, Jim Fletcher. Often appearing on Australian television police dramas and soap operas throughout the 1970s and 80s, he is also one of Australia's top voice actors, voicing numerous commercials and narrations during the 1990s and early 2000s.

== Early life ==
Maguire was born in September 1945 and began acting during the late 1960s, shortly after graduating from the National Institute of Dramatic Art with a Diploma of Dramatic Art in 1967. Out of 3,000 applicants, he was one of 15 students to complete the program.

== Career ==
=== Early career ===
After minor one-time roles on the television series Riptide and The Link Men, Maguire made his feature film debut in The Demonstrator with Joe James and Irene Inescort. In the film, he portrayed university student Steve Slater whose political differences with his father Joe Slater, a Federal cabinet minister, result in his leading a series of protests disrupting his father's activities in organising an international conference. The film was considered a commercial failure. Following this he starred in the film Country Town (1971) Country Town was a feature film spin-off from Australian Broadcasting Corporation soap opera Bellbird.

In the late 1960s and the 1970s, he was a guest actor on drama series Dynasty, Ryan, and on police procedural series Matlock Police, Homicide, Division 4 and Cop Shop. Joining the Melbourne Theatre Company, he also performed in Going Home at St. Martin's Theatre on 11 March 1976. That same year, he starred with Tom Oliver and Kate Sheil in David Williamson's A Handful of Friends at the Russell Street Theatre in Melbourne. Maguire went on to supporting roles in the television miniseries Luke's Kingdom and the film Mad Dog Morgan. In 1978 he was part of the cast in the first public performance of Kenneth G. Ross's important Australian play Breaker Morant: A Play in Two Acts, presented by the Melbourne Theatre Company at the Athenaeum Theatre, in Melbourne, Victoria, Australia, on 2 February 1978.

A late arrival during the first season of Prisoner, Maguire joined the cast in mid 1979 as Deputy Governor Jim Fletcher and eventually became the only main male character during his three years on the series. Maguire eventually left during the show's fourth season in early 1982. During his last year with the series, he appeared with Prisoner co-stars Colette Mann and Val Lehman in Kitty and the Bagman (1982).

During 1983, Maguire starred as Dr. John Rivers in the short lived television series Starting Out. As one of the school's tutors and the father of the disfigured Michelle (Rowena Mohr), his time on the series dealt with Rivers' guilt over his daughter's accident while dealing with his unhappily married wife Yvonne (Suzy Gashler).

After the series' cancellation, Maguire made a guest appearance on Special Squad and had supporting roles in The Surfer and Alice to Nowhere before returning to the stage in 1986 to perform in David Williamson's Sons of Cain which ran for five-months in London's West End. In 1987, was a television presenter for Ground Zero and appeared in one episode of The Flying Doctors during the next two years. Maguire also appeared during the final season of the soap opera The Power, The Passion as a police investigator and ex-boyfriend of one of the central characters, Ellen Byrne Edmonds (Olivia Hamnett).

=== Producing and writing ===
While producing a film adaptation of a novel during the mid-1980s, he replaced the screenwriter originally working on the screenplay. Contacted by Columbia Pictures, he flew to California to discuss the project, he met producer and then Senior Vice-president Jane Alsobrook. He soon began a romantic relationship and Maguire ended up staying in Los Angeles for the next several years. In 1993, he and Lance Peters co-wrote Gross Misconduct, later directed by George T. Miller and, the following year, wrote Seduce Me: Pamela Principle 2 and was the script supervisor for Tunnel Vision. He was also involved in acting workshops with actors such as Jon Voight among others.

=== Return to Australia ===
In 1995, he moved back to Australia with Alsobrook when she accepted a position as president of Australia's largest independent film production and distribution company, REP. During the mid-to-late 1990s, Maguire appeared in the television movies Heart of Fire, The Fury Within and The Finder as well as the guest appearances on the television series Water Rats, Murder Call and All Saints. He became a voice actor, eventually narrating hundreds of commercials and, in 1995, was the voice of Titanium Man in the series Iron Man. During the 2000 Summer Olympics in Sydney, he was the announcer during the diving events.

=== Return to USA ===
Following the September 11 attacks, Maguire moved to the United States allowing his wife to be closer to her family in Sedona, Arizona. Although continuing to be involved in a number of film projects with his wife, he also became involved in local theatre agreeing to appear in theatrical performances with the Canyon Moon Theatre Company and, in April 2002, appeared as the narrator in Side By Side By Sondheim at the Old Marketplace in West Sedona.

Maguire continued working as a voice actor during the next several years via the internet. After a five-year absence, Maguire made an appearance in the 2007 independent film Brothel.

As of 2013, Maguire lives in Arizona.

== Filmography ==
=== Film ===
| Year | Title | Role | Type |
|---|---|---|---|
| 1969 | You Can't See 'Round Corners | Terry (uncredited) | Feature film |
| 1971 | Demonstrator | Steven Slater | Feature film |
| 1971 | Country Town | Phillip Henderson | Feature film |
| 1972 | Crisis | | TV film |
| 1976 | Secret Doors | | TV film |
| 1976 | Mad Dog Morgan | Rutherford | Feature film |
| 1979 | Burn the Butterflies | | TV film |
| 1981 | Prisoner in Concert | Jim Fletcher | TV film |
| 1982 | Kitty and the Bagman | Cyril | Film |
| 1984 | The Bodyguard | Lawyer | Short film |
| 1986 | The Surfer | | |
| 1987 | Death Ware | Jack | |
| 1987 | Ground Zero | TV presenter | Feature film |
| 1988 | Vicious! (aka To Make a Killing) | Brian Kennedy | Feature film |
| 1989 | Mull | Dr. Graham | |
| 1993 | Gross Misconduct | Vice Chancellor | Feature film |
| 1997 | Heart of Fire | Scott Dodd | TV film |
| | The Fury Within | Dr. Daryl Levine | TV film |
| 2001 | The Finder | Sgt. Jack Matthews | TV film |
| 2002 | Bloodsports | Barry Kelly | TV film |
| 2003 | Code 11-14 | Captain Copeland | TV film |
| 2008 | Brothel | Curtis | Feature film |

=== Television ===
| Year | Title | Role | Type |
|---|---|---|---|
| 1969 | Riptide | Tractor Driver | Episode: "North of the Headland" |
| 1970 | The Link Men | Terry | Episode: "Somebody's Kid is Missing" |
| 1970-71 | Dynasty | Jamie Brooks | 2 episodes |
| 1973 | Ryan | Jack Baker | 2 episodes |
| 1971-74 | Matlock Police | Ted Brewer, Keith Evans, Mick Johnson, Terry Harris, Nick Rogers, Walt Rogers | 6 episodes |
| 1969-73 | Homicide | Wilson, Bruce Foster, Lyell Revel, Gecko, Riley | 4 episodes |
| 1969-75 | Division 4 | Vince Jordon, George Flack, Jerry Thompson, Martin Roche, Mike Turner, Donald West, Phillip Reid, Brent Campbell, Cookson | 9 episodes |
| 1975 | Shannon's Mob | Fraser | Episode: "When Collier Came" |
| 1976 | Luke's Kingdom | | 13 episodes |
| 1976 | Power Without Glory | Colin Lassiter | TV miniseries, 2 episodes |
| 1977 | Bluey | Larry Davis | Episode: "The Pick Up" |
| 1978-79 | Cop Shop | Peter Galbraith, Phillip Kline, Frank Garde, Eddy Marshall | 7 episodes |
| 1980 | Lawson's Mates | Jock | Episode: "Joe Wilson" |
| | The Daryl Somers Show | Man with parked car (uncredited) | |
| | Prisoner: Cell Block H | Jim Fletcher | 209 episodes |
| 1983 | Starting Out | Dr. John Rivers | |
| 1984 | Special Squad | Hansen | Episode: "The Wurzburg Link" |
| 1985 | The Fast Lane | Bill Martin | Episode: "Irreconcilable Differences" |
| 1986 | The Lancaster Miller Affair | Frank Upton | Miniseries |
| 1986 | Alice to Nowhere | Tim Sanderson | Miniseries |
| 1987 | Neighbours | Parnell | |
| 1988 | The Flying Doctors | Harry McDonald | Episode: "Johnnie Come Home" |
| 1989 | The Power, The Passion | David | |
| 1989 | Bodysurfer | Gordon | Miniseries |
| 1990 | The Bradys | Australian Envoy | Episode: "The Party Girls" |
| 1990 | Embassy | Freddie | 3 episodes |
| 1995 | Iron Man | Titanium Man (voice) | Episode: "Distant Boundaries" |
| 1997 | Heartbreak High | Tom Harding | |
| 1998 | Water Rats | Lloyd Venables | Episode: "Old Bones" |
| 1999 | Murder Call | Donald Cook | |
| | All Saints | Peter Maloney | 2 episodes |

== Theatre ==
| Year | Title | Role | Venue / Co. |
|---|---|---|---|
| 1966 | Two Programs of Short Plays: The Pier / The Caretaker | Sam / Mick | Jane Street Theatre, Sydney |
| 1967 | Camille and Perdican | Perdican | UNSW Old Tote Theatre with NIDA |
| 1967 | Point of Departure | Monsieur Henri | UNSW Old Tote Theatre with NIDA |
| 1967 | Three Men on a Horse | Charlie | UNSW, Sydney with NIDA |
| 1967 | The Winter’s Tale | Shepherd | UNSW, Sydney with NIDA |
| | The Lion in Winter | | |
| | Bye Bye Birdie | | Menzies Hotel, Sydney |
| | Henry V | | Queensland tour with Youth Elizabethans |
| | Macbeth | | Queensland tour with Youth Elizabethans |
| 1968; 1969; 1970 | The Boys in the Band | Larry | Phillip Street Theatre, Sydney, Playhouse, Canberra, Playbox Theatre, Melbourne, His Majesty's Theatre, Perth, Hobart with Harry M. Miller |
| 1970 | The Trial of the Catonsville Nine | | Pitt Street Congregational Church, Sydney |
| 1972 | Rooted | | Nimrod Street Theatre, Sydney |
| 1972 | Don's Party | | UNSW Old Tote Theatre, Playhouse, Canberra with NIDA |
| 1973 | Jugglers Three | | Playhouse, Canberra, Wagga Wagga Civic Theatre, Hunter Theatre, Sydney, Her Majesty's Theatre, Brisbane, UNSW Old Tote Theatre with MTC |
| 1975 | Doreen | | AMP Theatrette, Sydney with Q Theatre Company |
| 1975 | The Seahorse | | UNSW with Old Tote Theatre Company |
| 1975 | Down Under | | Stables Theatre, Sydney with King O'Malley Theatre Company |
| 1976 | Going Home | | St Martins Theatre, Melbourne with MTC |
| 1976 | A Handful of Friends | | Russell Street Theatre, Melbourne with MTC |
| 1977 | The School for Scandal | Joseph Surface | Melbourne Athenaeum with MTC |
| 1977 | The Club | Gerry | Russell Street Theatre, Melbourne with MTC |
| 1977 | Cop Out | Randolph Dyson | Russell Street Theatre, Melbourne with MTC |
| 1978 | Breaker Morant | Major Bolton | Melbourne Athenaeum with MTC |
| 1978 | Makassar Reef | Weeks Brown | Russell Street Theatre, Melbourne with MTC |
| 1978 | The Resistible Rise of Arturo Ui | Ragg | Melbourne Athenaeum with MTC (also played trumpet & trombone) |
| 1978 | Arsenic and Old Lace | Officer O'Hara | Melbourne Athenaeum with MTC |
| 1984 | The Threepenny Opera | Jake | Playhouse, Melbourne with MTC |
| 1984 | Pax Americana | The President's Brother | Playhouse, Melbourne with MTC |
| 1985 | Other Places: One for the Road / Victoria Station / A Kind of Alaska | | Melbourne Athenaeum with MTC |
| 1985 | Glengarry Glen Ross | Williamson | Russell Street Theatre, Melbourne with MTC |
| 1986 | Sons of Cain | Laurie Byrne | Suncorp Theatre, Brisbane, Wyndham’s Theatre, London with Queensland Theatre, Australian Elizabethan Theatre Trust & Theatre of Comedy |
| 1987 | Emerald City | Malcolm | Playhouse, Melbourne with MTC |
| 2002 | Side by Side by Sondheim | Narrator | Old Marketplace, Sedona, Arizona |
| 2024 | Blithe Spirit | Dr. Bradman | Apotheca, Arizona with Red Earth Theatre |

=== As director ===
| Year | Title | Role | Venue / Co. |
|---|---|---|---|
| 2001 | The Dreamer Examines His Pillow | Director | Bondi Pavilion, Sydney |
