= Catspaw (TV series) =

- Written by: Ted Roberts
- Directed by: David Zweck; John Gauci; Michael Ludbrook
- Starring: Michael Duffield; Tim Robertson; Rowena Wallace
- Composer: Brian May
- Country of origin: Australia
- Original language: English
- No. of episodes: 7

Production
- Producer: Oscar Whitbread
- Running time: 30 minutes

Original release
- Network: ABC
- Release: 8 June – 20 July 1978

Catspaw is an Australian serial drama-action TV series about an airforce officer who becomes involved with mercenaries.

It aired on the ABC on 8 June 1978 and ended on 20 July of the same year running for only one season and a total of seven episodes. The story line was told in serialised form.

== Cast ==
- Peter Sumner as Harry Sawtell
- Gus Mercurio as The Colonel
- Rowena Wallace as Kate Keppel
- Michael Duffield as Barton
- Tim Robertson as Instructor
- Ken James as Nuggett
- John Stanton
- Peter Aanensen
- Warwick Sims as Tim Keppel

== Production ==
It was filmed on location around Melbourne and in the ABC Ripponlea Studios.

== Reception ==
The Age criticised it for "comic strip depth". The Sun Herald called it "no more than routine."

== Episodes ==
1. (2 June 1978 - Melbourne) Sawtell investigates the disappearance of a hospital gunship piloted by his best friend, Keppel.
2. (9 June 1978) Sawtell discovers Keppel owed a lot of money. Corrigan keeps watch on Kate's flat.
3. (16 June 1978) Sawtell discovers Kate and Corrigan are missing.
4. (23 June 1978)
5. (30 June 1978) Sawtell, Kate and Keppel try to escape but Kate is recaptured. Sawtell and Keppel find an injured Corrigan.
6. (7 July 1978) The Colonel orders the evacuation of the camp. Sawtell and Keppel begin an attack
7. (14 July 1978) Sawtell is wounded. He leaves Kate to get help for Keppel. He wakes up in a strange hospital room.
