= Death of a Salesman (Play of the Month) =

- Play of the Month episode
- Directed by: Alan Cooke
- Based on: Death of a Salesman; 1949 play by Arthur Miller
- Original air date: 24 May 1966
- Running time: 100 min

"Death of a Salesman" is a television play episode of the BBC One anthology television series Play of the Month, based on the 1949 play of the same name by Arthur Miller. It was directed by Alan Cooke, starred Rod Steiger as Willy Loman. and originally aired on 24 May 1966

The production gained two BAFTA nominations. Despite this, a recording does not seem to have survived.

== Cast ==
- Rod Steiger as Willy Loman
- Betsy Blair as Linda
- Joss Ackland as Charley
- Tony Bill as Biff
- Kenneth J. Warren as Uncle Ben
- Brian Davies as Happy
- Clive Endersby as Bernard
- David Healy as Edward Wagner
- Marc Farren as Stanley
- Diana Ashley as Miss Forsythe
- Lyndel Rowe as Letta
- Marcella Markham as Woman
