= Contrabandits =

Australian television series

- Genre: Drama
- Directed by: John Croyston
- Starring: Denis Quilley; John Bonney; Ben Gabriel; John Gregg
- Country of origin: Australia
- Original language: English
- No. of episodes: 30

Production
- Executive producer: Eric Tayler
- Running time: 60 minutes

Original release
- Network: ABC
- Release: 22 September 1967 – 5 December 1968

Contrabandits is a 1967 Australian television series about the work of the customs department.

== Cast ==
=== Main / regular ===
- John Bonney as Bob Piper
- Denis Quilley as Chief Inspector Ted Hallam
- Janet Kingsbury as Mardi Shiel
- Ben Gabriel as Jim Shirley
- Bob Haddow as Ross
- John Gregg as Charles Keally

=== Guests ===
- Alastair Duncan as Blind Cyril / Darnell / Hauschild (3 episodes)
- Anne Charleston as Judy (1 episode)
- Barbara Frawley as Cisca (1 episode)
- Benita Collings as Air hostess (1 episode)
- Dennis Miller as Steve Chambers (1 episode)
- Don Crosby as Eddie Miller / Glover (2 episodes)
- Edward Hepple as Erley (2 episodes)
- Edward Howell as Quillen (1 episode)
- Gillian Jones as Marcia Haslek (1 episode)
- Helen Morse as Angela Carrol (1 episode)
- James Condon as Austin (1 episode)
- John Ewart as Murdoch (1 episode)
- John Gaden as Crowe (1 episode)
- John Paisley as Mate
- Kevin Miles as John Courbert / Hoffman / Kraft (3 episodes)
- Les Foxcroft as Sect Member / Foreman (2 episodes)
- Linal Haft as Adams (1 episode)
- Mary Ann Severne
- Max Cullen as Allen (1 episode)
- Pat Bishop as Hazel Reeves (1 episode)
- Penne Hackforth-Jones (1 episode)
- Peter Collingwood as Tom Keating (1 episode)
- Peter Whitford as Doorman / Waiter / Bingo (2 episodes)
- Redmond Phillips as Neirmacher (1 episode)
- Reg Gorman as Pogo / Fred (2 episodes)
- Richard Meikle as Sam Kodiak (1 episode)
- Robert Helpmann as Donald Steele (1 episode)
- Rod Mullinar (1 episode)
- Ron Graham as Det. Sgt Thomson (1 episode)
- Ron Haddrick as Dallas / George Payne (2 episodes)
- Rowena Wallace as Carole (1 episode)
- Shane Porteous as Jock (1 episode)
- Slim de Grey as Wilson (1 episode)
- Tom Oliver as Nicholls (3 episodes)
- Wynn Roberts as Joshua Stoney / Arnell (2 episodes)

== Episodes ==
Series	Episodes	Originally released	
Series	Episodes	First released	Last released
1	13	22 September 1967	15 December 1967
2	17	15 August 1968	5 December 1968

=== Series 1 ===
No. overall	No. in series	Title	Directed by	Written by	Original release date
1	1	"Cage A Tame Tiger"	Eric Tayler	Colin Free	22 September 1967
2	2	"Bait And Little Fishes"	Unknown	Martyn Sanderson and Nigel Roberts	29 September 1967
3	3	"Horse On The Wing"	Unknown	Unknown	6 October 1967
4	4	"Corner Of The Market"	Unknown	Unknown	13 October 1967
5	5	"Sweet And Sour"	Unknown	Allan Trevor	20 October 1967
6	6	"A Drop In The Ocean"	Unknown	Allan Trevor	27 October 1967
7	7	"Madame Ukelele"	Unknown	Unknown	3 November 1967
8	8	"Target, Smokehouse"	Wilf Buckner	James Workman	10 November 1967
9	9	"Films Are Just For Kicks"	Unknown	Unknown	17 November 1967
10	10	"Deadly Harvest"	Unknown	Unknown	24 November 1967
11	11	"A Case Of Kinetics"	Unknown	Unknown	1 December 1967
12	12	"Man On The Hook"	Albie Thoms	Unknown	8 December 1967
13	13	"Time Out"	Eric Tayler	Colin Free	15 December 1967

=== Series 2 ===
No. overall	No. in series	Title	Directed by	Written by	Original release date
14	1	"Closed Circuit"	Unknown	Unknown	15 August 1968
15	2	"Samson Out Of Joint"	Unknown	Unknown	22 August 1968
16	3	"Money For Jam"	Unknown	Unknown	29 August 1968
17	4	"In For A Penny"	Brian Faull	John Martin	5 September 1968
Guest starring Robert Helpmann. This episode was shot entirely on film.
18	5	"The Professionals"	Unknown	Unknown	12 September 1968
19	6	"Double Exposure"	John Croyston	Robert Peach	19 September 1968
20	7	"Game For Two Players"	Unknown	Martyn Sanderson	26 September 1968
21	8	"Tiger By The Tail"	Eric Tayler	Colin Free	3 October 1968
22	9	"According To Arcadius"	Brian Faull	Colin Free	10 October 1968
23	10	"Write-Off"	Ken Hannam	Brian Wright	17 October 1968
24	11	"A Mention In Despatches"	Unknown	Unknown	24 October 1968
25	12	"Fool's Gold"	Ken Hannam	John Martin	31 October 1968
26	13	"Collectors Piece"	Unknown	Unknown	7 November 1968
27	14	"File It Under Personal"	Unknown	Unknown	14 November 1968
28	15	"Double Entry"	John Croyston	Ron Harrison	21 November 1968
29	16	"Blind Man's Bluff"	Brian Bell	Martyn Sanderson	28 November 1968
30	17	"A Good Way To Go or What a Way to Go"	Unknown	Unknown	5 December 1968
