= Edmund Pegge =

Australian actor (born 1939)

- Born: Edmund Cyril Colbeck Pegge; 1 April 1939 (age 87); Windsor, Berkshire, England
- Occupation: Actor

Edmund Pegge (born 1 April 1939) is an Australian actor who has worked in both Australia and the United Kingdom.

== Early life ==
Arriving in Adelaide as a teenager, Pegge completed his education at St Peter's College before graduating from the National Institute of Dramatic Art. Joining the exodus of Australian actors to London in the mid-sixties, he has since divided his time between the two countries, to work and visit family.

== Career ==
His television credits include: Division 4, Matlock Police, Moonbase 3, Doctor Who (in the serial The Invisible Enemy), Secret Army, Return of the Saint, Codename Icarus, Bird of Prey, Tenko, It Ain't Half Hot Mum, The Day of the Triffids, One by One, The Winds of War, Anzacs, Howards' Way, Doctors, Rosemary & Thyme and Home Sweet Home. Pegge appears in the first two volumes of The Phoenix Files audio dramas as Robert Montag.

Forever Horatio: An Actor's Life, an autobiography written by the actor and featuring a foreword by Judi Dench, was published in 2017 by Wakefield Press.

== Filmography ==
=== Film ===
Year	Film	Role	Type
1962	My Three Angels	Paul	TV movie
1963	The Tempest	Ferdinand	TV movie
1967	Death Happens to Other People	Lieutenant Miller	TV movie
1967	Carry On Follow That Camel	Bowler (uncredited)	Feature film
1973	Scream...and Die!	Kent	Feature film. Also known as The House That Vanished and Please! Don’t Go into the Bedroom
1974	Human Target		TV movie
1977	The Savage Case of the End of Civilization As We Know It	Second Australian	Feature film
1980	Nightmares	Bruce	Feature film
1982	A Good Night’s Sleep: Risk Management		Short film
1985	Robbery Under Arms	Peter Dawson	TV movie
1986	The Fools on the Hill	George More O’Ferrall	TV movie
1987	Cause Célèbre	Constable Bagwell	TV movie
1991	Sweet Talker	Businessman	Feature film
1997	Heaven's Burning	Hotel Manager	Feature film
1997	Maslin Beach	Michael	Feature film
2000	Selkie	Gordon	Feature film
2002	Black and White	Dawson	Feature film
2011	Swerve	Buyer	Feature film
2018	A.R.S.E.	Jerry	Short film
2020	Never Too Late	Howard	Feature film

=== Television ===
Year	Film	Role	Type
1964	The Stranger		Miniseries, 1 episode
1964	Crossroads	Mr Jessel	TV series
1965	Londoners	John	TV series, 1 episode
1965	Love Story	Wilson	TV series, 1 episode
1970	Take Three Girls	Steve	TV series, 1 episode
1970	The Troubleshooters	Roberts	TV series, 1 episode
1970	A Family at War	Aussie	TV series, 1 episode
1971	Francis Durbridge’s Paul Temple	Albert	TV series, 1 episode
1972	Escape Into Night	Dr Burton	Miniseries, 6 episodes
1973	BBC Play of the Month		1 episode
1973	Moonbase 3	Macadam	Miniseries, 1 episode
1974	Matlock Police	Peter Edwards	TV series, 1 episode
1974	Silent Number	Richard	TV series, 1 episode
1974	Out of Love		Miniseries, 2 episodes
1974-75	Division 4	Barry Morgan / Bill Reed	TV series, 2 episodes
1975	Homicide	Josh Hartley / David Chambers	TV series, 2 episodes
1976	Luke's Kingdom	Lieutenant Roberts	Miniseries, 13 episodes
1976	Orde Wingate	Chindit	Miniseries, 1 episode
1976	The Expert	Police Inspector	TV series, 1 episode
1976	The Emigrants	Australian	Miniseries, 1 episode
1976	When the Boat Comes In	Buell	TV series, 1 episode
1977	Miss Jones and Son	Brian	TV series, 1 episode
1977	Rough Justice	Barry Tomlin	TV series, 1 episode
1977	Follow Me…	Forman	Miniseries, 4 episodes
1977	Doctor Who	Meeker	TV series, 1 episode
1977	It Ain't Half Hot Mum	Australian Colonel	TV series, 1 episode
1977	Secret Army	Teddy Marsh	TV series, 1 episode
1978	Life at Stake	Newsreader	TV series, 1 episode
1978	Get Some In!	Pilot	TV series, 1 episode
1978	Return of the Saint	Police Officer	TV series, 1 episode
1979	Skyways	Snr Detective Meggs	TV series, 2 episodes
1979-80	Cop Shop	Lex Connors / Howard Ellis	TV series, 3 episodes
1980	Spring & Fall	Charles	TV series, 1 episode
1980	Juliet Bravo	Barman	TV series, 1 episode
1980-82	Home Sweet Home	Father Murphy	TV series, 26 episodes
1981	A Sharp Intake of Breath	P.C. Wilkins	TV series, 1 episode
1981	The Day of the Triffids	Walter	Miniseries, 1 episode
1981	Angels	Malcolm Royston	TV series, 1 episode
1981	Codename Icarus	Naval Officer	Miniseries, 2 episodes
1981-82	Tenko	Bernard Webster	TV series, 3 episodes
1982	Bird of Prey	Lanchbury	TV series, 1 episode
1982	Sorry!	Mr Thropley / 1st Lieutenant	TV series, 1 episode
1983	The Winds of War	Air Commodore Byrne-Wilke	Miniseries, 2 episodes
1985	One by One	Co-pilot	TV series
1985	Gems	Terence Moran	TV series, 3 episodes
1985	Howards' Way	Basil	TV series, 1 episode
1985	Anzacs	Captain Young	Miniseries, 2 episodes
1985	Big Deal	Jonathan Turnbull	TV series, 3 episodes
1986	Chance in a Million	Gerry	TV series, 1 episode
1987	The Mistress	Man next door	TV series, 1 episode
1987	Truckers	Denzil Sweetman	TV series, 1 episode
1988	Australians	General Percival	TV series, 1 episode
1989	Boon	Mr Allsop	TV series, 1 episode
1989	Gentlemen and Players	Metcalfe	TV series, 1 episode
1991	Golden Fiddles	Mr Craig	TV series, 2 episodes
1991	The River Kings	Fred Thompson	TV series, 4 episodes
1991	Heroes II: The Return	Major Chapman	Miniseries, 2 episodes
1992	The Bill	Chief Inspector Hutchinson	TV series, 1 episode
1997	Heartbreak High	George Freedom	TV series, 1 episode
1998	Murder Call	James Hartman	TV series, 1 episode
2000	The Potato Factory	Bank Executive	Miniseries, 4 episodes
2003	Doctors	Graham Huntley	TV series, 1 episode
2004	Jessica	Sneddon	Miniseries
2006	Rosemary & Thyme	Charlie Gudgeon	TV series, 1 episode
2016	Wolf Creek	Travelling Salesman	TV series, 1 episode
