= A Touch of Reverence =

- Genre: mini-series
- Written by: Charles Stamp
- Directed by: Carl Schultz
- Starring: Peter Sumner; Peter Collingwood; Graham Rouse; Ben Gabriel; Helen Morse; Wendy Hughes
- Country of origin: Australia
- Original language: English
- No. of episodes: 3

Production
- Running time: 3 x 1 hour

Original release
- Network: ABC
- Release: 21 November – 5 December 1974

A Touch of Reverence is a 1974 Australian mini-series about an Anglican minister whose success as a rainmaker lands him in court.

== Plot ==
The Rev. Alex Bartlett is a progressive Anglican parson in suburban Sydney who builds a mini-golf course in the churchyard, angering the congregation and the Bishop. The Bishop sends Bartlett to the small town of Bulawot in central New South Wales, which is experiencing a severe drought. Locals are depressed due to the drought and not attending church but Bartlett suggests they all pray for rain, with stunning results.

== Cast ==
- Peter Sumner as Rev Alex Bartlett
- Peter Collingwood as the Bishop
- Wendy Hughes as Beverley Bartlett
- Graham Rouse
- Ben Gabriel
- Helen Morse
- Tina Bursill

== Production ==
The series was filmed on location in Stuart Town in central Western New South Wales, and Sydney. Heavy rain and snow in Stuart Town caused delays in filming.
