= Human Target (film) =

- Directed by: Howard Rubie
- Written by: Ron McLean
- Produced by: Roger Mirams; Ron McLean
- Starring: Jack Thompson; Pat Bishop; Enid Lorimer; Edmund Pegge; Peter Sumner
- Distributed by: Network Nine
- Release date: 1974
- Running time: 90 mins
- Country: Australia
- Language: English

Human Target is a 1974 Australian film about a special agent investigating the opium trade. The same team had just made Spyforce which also featured Jack Thompson.

It was one of three TV movies that Channel Nine made, with a budget of a million dollars all up. The others were The Spiral Bureau and Paradise.

== Cast ==
- Alfred Bell
- Pat Bishop
- Liz Crossan
- Enid Lorimer
- Edmund Pegge
- Peter Sumner
- Jack Thompson as Anderson
