= Catalyst (Australian Plays) =

- Australian Plays episode
- Episode no.: Season 2 Episode 3
- Teleplay by: C.F. Barnes
- Original air date: 5 July 1970
- Running time: 55 mins

Episode chronology
← Previous "Face of a Man"	Next → "Ritual"

"Catalyst" is a 1970 Australian TV play. It was a business drama with "CF Barnes" a nom de plume for an Australian novelist.

== Premise ==
When minority shareholder Arthur Lambert moves out of the boardroom and becomes involved in the day-to-day running of the firm of Conquest Engineering, managing director Keyes and marketing manager Parrish start to wonder about the security of their jobs.

== Cast ==
- Tony Ward
- Richard Parry
- Peter Reynolds
- John Warwick
- Don Barkham
- Brian Anderson
- Kirsty Child
