= Volpone (Wednesday Theatre) =

- Wednesday Theatre episode
- Episode no.: Season 4 Episode 16
- Directed by: John Croyston
- Based on: Volpone by Ben Jonson
- Original air date: 17 April 1968
- Running time: 100 mins

Episode chronology
← Previous "Shadow on the Wall"	Next → "The Proposal and the Bear"

"Volpone" is a 1968 Australian TV play based on the comedy play Volpone by the English playwright Ben Jonson. It aired as part of Wednesday Theatre on ABC on 17 April 1968 in Melbourne, and on 18 April 1967 in Sydney. "Volpone" was directed by John Croyston.

== Cast ==
- Peter O'Shaughnessy as Volpone
- Max Meldrum as Mosca
- Edward Ogden as Voltore
- Peter Collingwood as Corvino
- Tom Farley as Corbaccio
- Pat Bishop as Celia
- Frank Lloyd
- Peter McPhie as Bonario

== Production ==
It was filmed in Sydney.
