= Shadow on the Wall (Wednesday Theatre) =

- Wednesday Theatre episode
- Episode no.: Season 2 Episode 15
- Directed by: Christopher Muir
- Teleplay by: Ru Pullan
- Original air date: 10 April 1968
- Running time: 30 mins

Episode chronology
← Previous "The Paraffin Season"	Next → "Volpone"

"Shadow on the Wall" is the 15th television play episode of the second season of the Australian anthology television series Wednesday Theatre. It was recorded in 1967 as part of Australian Playhouse but was not aired until 10 April 1968 in Melbourne and Sydney as part of Wednesday Theatre. It was a rare contemporary Australian TV drama to address the Vietnam War.

It ran for 30 minutes.

== Premise ==
In a North Vietnamese village, there is conflict between a local priest and the local political commissar.

== Cast ==
- Allan Tobin as Captain Yun
- Keith Lee as the bishop
- Mark Albiston as Comissar Kin
- Lyndel Rowe as Lin Tan
- Michael Duffield as Sam Ho
- Farida Jauhari
- Richard Lee
- Suzette Jauhari

== Production ==
It was filmed at ABC's studios in Ripponlea in April 1967 for Australian Playhouse but was not screened until the following year, when it aired as an episode of Wednesday Theatre.

== Reception ==
The Age said it "might've been a good idea but it didn't come off" arguing the play was more suited to radio and that the actors and sets were not convincing and adding it "lacked conviction - and the climax was missed photographically."
