= Australian Plays =

Australian anthology TV series

- Genre: anthology
- Country of origin: Australia
- Original language: English
- No. of episodes: 12

Production
- Producer: Eric Taylor
- Running time: 70 minutes

Original release
- Network: ABC
- Release: 1969 – 1970

Australian Plays is a 1969-1970 Australian anthology TV drama series that aired on the ABC. It consisted of six original Australian dramas.

It was the first Australian drama play since Lucullus in Sydney and Cobwebs in Concrete in Melbourne.

It was the first Australian anthology series since Australian Playhouse and was described by the ABC as "representative of contemporary Australian writers and the development of Australian television drama today." It was produced by Eric Taylor. It was meant to be followed by a series Company of Eight which will have a regular repertory company of eight actors. Australian TV drama was relatively rare at the time.

== Episodes ==
=== Season 1 (1969) ===
- Ep. 1 - "Dynasty"
- Ep. 2 - "Voyage Out"
- Ep. 3 - "The Cheerful Cuckold"
- Ep. 4 - "Tilley Landed On Our Shore"
- Ep. 5 - "The Torrents"
- Ep. 6 - "Fiends of the Family"

=== Season 2 (1970) ===
- Ep. 1 - "Eden House"
- Ep. 2 - "The Juggler"
- Ep. 3 - "Catalyst"
- Ep. 4 - "Ritual"
- Ep. 5 - "Farce of a Man"
- Ep. 6 - "Chimes at Midnight"
