= The Cheerful Cuckold =

- Australian Plays episode
- Episode no.: Season 1 Episode 3
- Directed by: Oscar Whitbread
- Teleplay by: Alan Hopgood
- Original air date: 3 December 1969
- Running time: 55 mins

Episode chronology
← Previous "Voyage Out"	Next → "Tilley Landed On Our Shore"

"The Cheerful Cuckold" is a 1969 Australian TV play. It was written by and stars Alan Hopgood.

== Plot ==
It was about a young university lecturer (Hopgood) who is cuckolded by his wife Sybil (Sue Donovan). He devises a method to deal with it.

== Cast ==
- Alan Hopgood as Gareth
- Sue Donovan as Sybil
- Joseph James as Max
- Robin Ramsay as Tony Champion
- Lyndel Rowe as Shirley
- Michael Duffield as Professor Garraway
- Tony Bonner

== Production ==
The show was recorded in late 1968. The Age previewed it, calling it "a delight" in an article dated 27 December 1968.

Hopgood's script was awarded an Awgie in March 1969. The show was not broadcast until December 1969.

== Reception ==
One critic called it "the most painful Australian production I have seen since television started."

The script won the Awgie Award.
