= Afterplay =

2002 one-act play by Brian Friel

Afterplay is a 2002 one-act play by Brian Friel. It centres on two characters from Chekhov (Sonya from Uncle Vanya and Andrey from Three Sisters) meeting in Moscow in the 1920s.

It premiered at the Gate Theatre in Dublin in 2002. It has been revived at the Gielgud Theatre in 2002, directed by Robin Lefevre and starring John Hurt (Andrey) and Penelope Wilton (Sonja) the King's Theatre, Edinburgh and in 2009, starring Frances Barber and Niall Buggy. The reviewer of the 2009 production wrote: "...in Friel's vision, in which Andrey and Sonya meet by chance, the emotional trauma of distant events weighs heavily." The Studio space at the Crucible Theatre production in 2014 starred Niamh Cusack (Sonja) and Sean Gallagher (Andrey).

The play premiered in New York at the Off Broadway Irish Repertory Theatre on 2 October 2016 in a limited engagement to 6 November 2016. Directed by Joe Dowling, the play stars Dermot Crowley and Dearbhla Molloy. The New York Times reviewer wrote: "Their dialogue sounds extemporaneous, their monologues genuine and heartfelt. Each listens to the other with visible compassion."
