= Menotti (TV series) =

Menotti is an Australian television series which screened in 1980–1981 on the ABC. It was created by Michael Craig and produced by John Croyston. It was written by Michael Jenkins, Peter Schreck, Robert Caswell, Michael Craig and Ted Roberts. It was directed by Julian Pringle, Frank Arnold, Russell Webb and Di Drew.

== Cast ==
- Ivar Kants as Father Menotti
- Peter Gwynne as Father Donnelly
- Geoffrey Rush as Father Peter Fuller
- Craig Pearce (1 episode)
- John Clayton as Tate (1 episode)
- Lorna Lesley (1 episode)
- Mary Ann Severne (1 episode)
- Lulu Pinkus (1 episode)

== See also ==
- List of Australian television series
