= Luke's Kingdom =

1976 Australian TV series

- Starring: Oliver Tobias; Helen Morse; Gerard Maguire
- Country of origin: Australia / United Kingdom
- No. of seasons: 1
- No. of episodes: 13

Production
- Running time: 60 minutes

Original release
- Network: Nine Network / ITV
- Release: 1976 (31 March – 23 June in the UK)

Luke's Kingdom is a 1976 Australian TV series set in colonial Australia. Directors included Peter Weir and writers included Elisabeth Kata and Tony Morphett. It was co-produced with Trident Television, the then owners of Yorkshire and Tyne Tees Television, and aired in 1976 on Nine Network in Australia and ITV in the United Kingdom.

In 1975, Trident Television acquired the series co-producer, Australia Pty Ltd. Filming completed in 1974.

The series starred Oliver Tobias as an Englishman who, in 1829, emigrates to Australia with his father and siblings to settle on a land grant in New South Wales. It was based on the novel Pages From A Squatter's Diary, by E. V. Timms.

== Cast ==
- Oliver Tobias as Luke Firbeck
- James Condon as Jason Firbeck
- Gerard Maguire as Samuel Firbeck
- Elisabeth Crosby as Jassy Firbeck
- Helen Morse as Kate
- Les Foxcroft as Morgan
- Willie Fennell as Shepherd
- Shirley Cameron as Innkeeper
- Joseph Fürst as Storekeeper
- Bettina Kenter as Anna-Louise
- Edmund Pegge as Lieutenant Robarts
- David Gulpilil as Aboriginal Boy
- Victoria Anoux as Rosie
- Frank Lloyd as Broker
- Enid Lorimer as Nanny
- Brian Moll as Settler
- Michael Aitkens as Brash
- Kevin Miles as Wilmot
- Judy Morris as Ellen
- John Fegan as The Priest
- Peter Sumner as Karl Walthausen
- John Meillon as Corporal Morris
- Don Crosby as Dr Harty
- Kate Fitzpatrick as Emily
- Robert McDarra as Bando
