= Altrincham Garrick =

English theatre company

The Altrincham Garrick Society was established in 1914 and presents theatrical entertainment of all kinds (including Drama, Comedy, Musicals and Pantomime) in its own theatre building (the Altrincham Garrick Playhouse) in Altrincham, Greater Manchester, England. The main auditorium seats 401 and is in use normally from the end of August to the following July. The society typically produces 12 or 13 mainstage productions per year, as well as 4 or 5 studio productions - these are all amateur productions run to professional standards.

The theatre also hosts productions from local visiting societies and schools, as well as 30 or more one-night shows per year from individual professionals and other production companies.

== The Playhouse ==
Built in 1931, and most recently refurbished in 1999, the playhouse consists of two performance spaces.

- The Main Auditorium, seating 401, is the main theatre auditorium. The society's core week-long performances are staged here, as well as the annual pantomime, plus a very wide range of outside productions (such as live music, comedy, dance and more). The Garrick's in-house school for art, known as the Garrick Academy of Performing Arts (GAPA), also stages productions here. This auditorium is well equipped with state-of-the-art lighting and sound equipment.
- The Lauriston Studio, seating 49, is an intimate and stimulating theatre space that complements the main auditorium. It is a fully integral part of the Altrincham Garrick Playhouse, staging typically up to 5 performances a year, plus other theatrical offerings from outside the Garrick.

The building has a 100-space free car park, a spacious lobby and a well-stocked theatre bar.

The building is staffed in the main by volunteers, and run by the artistic director and the operations director. There are also a small number of employees in specific areas which need to be staffed during the day – such as the box office, cleaning and workshop.
