= Lucullus (TV play) =

Lucullus is a 1969 Australian television play. It aired 5 April 1969 in Melbourne and 7 April in Sydney and was produced in Sydney for Easter. It went for 70 minutes and was produced by Robert Allnut from a script by Denys Burrows.

== Plot ==
Mercellus, the son of Marcus Lucullus, a Roman merchant, has disappeared. Lucullus, fearing a scandal, sends his most trusted man to make a discrete inquiry. It turns out Mercellus has become a Christian. Marcus and his slave Galdo travel through Palestine. They meet Leah, the daughter of a Jewish scholar, who has also embraced the new religion. The son and Leah make Marcus understand the new faith that is changing the world.

== Cast ==
- Ron Graham as Marcus Lucullus
- Kirrily Nolan as Leah
- Barry Donnelly
- Ron Reid
- Muriel Hopkins
- Martin Harris
- Moshe Kedem

== Production ==
The production was entirely shot on location - it was believed this was the longest TV play to be done in this manner in Australia. Arnold Butcher did the music. The Sydney suburb of Brookvale was used to create Palestine.

The play was written especially for the ABC by Denys Burrows, for Easter.
