= Richard Beynon (writer) =

Australian-born playwright, actor and television producer

Richard Beynon (28 March 1925 — 1 March 1999) was an Australian-born playwright, actor and television producer.

== Biography ==
Beynon was born in the inner Melbourne suburb of Carlton in 1925. He was educated at University High School and studied phonetics at the Albert St Conservatorium. He went to England in 1947 and joined a repertory company on the Isle of Wight. He later performed in West End plays.

His best known work as a playwright is The Shifting Heart which premiered in Australia in 1957 and the United Kingdom in 1959.

He later worked as a BBC television producer on shows such as Z-Cars and The Duchess of Duke Street.

== Works ==
- Simpson J. 202
- Summer Shadows
- The Shifting Heart
- Face of a Man
