= Lyndel Rowe =

Australian actress

- Occupation: Actress
- Known for: Sons and Daughters & theatre roles

Lyndel Rowe is an Australian actress of stage, television and film, who is best known for her work with the Melbourne Theatre Company, the Sydney Theatre Company and the State Theatre Company of South Australia, and for her role as Karen Fox/Hamilton in the television soap opera Sons and Daughters.

== Career ==
=== Theatre ===
Rowe joined the Union Repertory Company (now the Melbourne Theatre Company), in productions including Patrick White's The Season at Sarsaparilla, Waltz of the Toreadors, Arms and the Man, Ghost Train and toured Australia with J.C. Williamson's production of Goodnight Mrs. Puffin (by Arthur Lovegrove), alongside Irene Handl.

Travelling to England, she studied at the Royal Court Theatre, with George Devine and Keith Johnstone. She performed in a production of Painting on Wood with the International Theatre Company of The Seventh Seal. From there she moved into repertory and into the company of a West End lunch-time theatre, TheatreScope, doing weekly seasons of one act works by playwrights such as Tennessee Williams, Ionesco and Anouilh.

She later returned to the UK to perform in several productions with the Liverpool Playhouse in 1979 – as Anna in Old Times, Dianne in Absent Friends and Raymonde in A Flea in Her Ear.

Invited back to the Melbourne Theatre Company at Russell Street Theatre, Rowe's roles included Nancy in The Knack, Raymonde in A Flea in her Ear, Irina in Three Sisters, Mary Warren in The Crucible, Margery Pinchwife in The Country Wife, Sheila in A Day in the Death of Joe Egg, Sandy in The Prime of Miss Jean Brodie, Clarice in The Servant of Two Masters, Marina in Pericles, Pip in Moby Dick, Grace in London Assurance, Charlotte in The Magistrate, Celemene in The Misanthrope and Gwendolyn in The Importance of Being Earnest.

Her credits with the Sydney Theatre Company included the roles of Kate in The Taming of the Shrew, Rose Trelawny in Trelawny of the "Wells", Sonya in Uncle Vanya, Marianne in Tartuffe and Charlotte in The Real Thing.

With the South Australian Theatre Company she played Phoebe in As You Like It, Daphne in Old King Cole, Jill in David Williamson’s A Handful of Friends. At the Playbox, Sydney, she played Lucy in the musical You're a Good Man, Charlie Brown. With Nimrod Street Theatre (now Belvoir), she played Gwendolen Carr in Tom Stoppard’s Travesties, and also performed in an Australian tour of Doctor in Love.

In 2004, Rowe appeared with Lewis Fiander in Afterplay under the direction of Malcolm Robertson, a UTRC veteran, at Fortyfivedownstairs, in Flinders Lane Melbourne.

=== Television ===
In Australia, Rowe's earliest appearance was in a television play Quiet Night (1961). Other TV plays included Light Me a Lucifer (1962), Shadow on the Wall (1968), The Cheerful Cuckold (1969) and The Torrents (1969), The Juggler (1970) and Banana Bender (1979). She also featured in the TV movies Moving On (1974) and later, I Can’t Get Started (1985).

She made numerous guest appearances in Australian television series throughout the 1960s and 1970s, including Consider Your Verdict, Homicide, Division 4, Delta, Matlock Police, Silent Number, The Last of the Australians, Solo One and Cop Shop.

In 1976, Rowe starred in the miniseries Tandarra for which she won a Logie Award for her role as Lizzy. Her best-known television role however, was that of Karen Fox (later Hamilton) in the Grundy’s soap opera Sons and Daughters for 73 episodes, from 1984 to 1985. In 1985, she also starred in the feature film Short Changed and the following year, appeared in children's film Playing Beattie Bow based on the novel by Ruth Park.

Rowe played French opera singer Blanche Marchesi in the 1988 biographical miniseries Melba about famed opera soprano Dame Nellie Melba, and Anne McClelland in the 1988 children's TV movie Touch the Sun: Princess Kate, alongside Justine Clarke and Claudia Karvan. She also had a later guest role in long-running police drama series Blue Heelers in 1994.

In the UK, Rowe's earliest role was playing Fenichka in the BBC miniseries of Turgenev's Fathers and Sons (1961). She featured in BBC Play of the Month Death of a Salesman (1966) with Rod Steiger. She also made guest appearances in television soap Compact (1965), as well as episodes of police procedural series Z-Cars (1971) and The Gentle Touch (1981).

=== Writing ===
Rowe has also written novels, short stories and a screenplay. She has had essays published in Australian literally journal "Meanjin", and has been twice chosen for publication in "The Best Australian Essays".

== Awards ==
Year	Work	Award	Category	Result
1976	Tandarra	Logie Award	Best Individual Performance by an Actress	Won
		Television Society Award		Won

== Filmography ==
=== Film ===
Year	Title	Role	Type
1985	Short Changed	Councillor	Feature film
1986	Playing Beattie Bow	Kathy Kirk	Feature film

=== Television ===
Year	Title	Role	Type
1961	Quiet Night		TV movie
1962	Light Me a Lucifer	Barbara Harmon	Teleplay
1964	Consider Your Verdict	Helen Humphries	TV series, 1 episode
1965	Compact	Margaret	TV series UK, 1 episode
1966	BBC Play of the Month	Jessie / Letta	TV series UK, 2 episodes
1967	Australian Playhouse		TV series, 1 episode
1967	Hey You!	Sharlene	TV series, 1 episode
1968–1976	Homicide	Patty Bourke / Doreen / Carol Gould / Vicki Kramer (as Lyndall Rowe)	TV series, 4 episodes
1968	Shadow on the Wall	Lin Tan	Teleplay
1969	The Cheerful Cuckold	Shirley	Teleplay
1969	The Torrents	J.G. Milford	Teleplay
1969–1973	Division 4	Jenny Armstrong / June / Norma Miles / Lorraine Hudson	TV series, 4 episodes
1970	The Juggler		Teleplay
1970	Delta	Jenny	TV series, 1 episode
1971; 1976	Matlock Police	Judy Morrow / Carol Price	TV series, 2 episodes
1971	Z-Cars	Jenny Swainson	TV series UK, 2 episodes
1971	Kate	Joyce Moore	TV series UK, 1 episode
1971	Father and Sons	Fenichka	TV miniseries UK, 4 episodes
1974	Moving On	Anne	TV movie
1974	Silent Number	Sharon	TV series, 1 episode
1975	The Last of the Australians	Maria Agostini	TV series, season 2, episode 12: "The Stone Final Utter Bloody End"
1976	Tandarra	Lizzy	TV series, 1 episode
1976	Solo One	Louise Duncan (as Lyn Rowe)	TV series, episode 12: "The Bike"
1978	Cop Shop	Jessie Turner	TV series, 2 episodes
1979	Banana Bender	Maureen	TV movie
1981	The Gentle Touch	Staff Nurse	TV series UK, 1 episode
1984–1985	Sons and Daughters	Karen Fox/Hamilton	TV series, 73 episodes
1985	I Can't Get Started	Valerie	TV movie
1987	Melba	Blanche Marchesi	TV miniseries, 6 episodes
1988	Touch the Sun: Princess Kate	Anne McLelland	TV movie
2003	Blue Heelers	Miss Stamford (as Lyndal Rowe)	TV series, 1 episode

== Theatre ==
Year	Title	Role	Notes
1958	The Crucible		Melbourne Little Theatre
1959	Moby Dick—Rehearsed	Assistant Stage Manager	Elizabethan Theatre, Sydney, University of Melbourne with Union Theatre Repertory Company
1959	The Waltz of the Toreadors	Pamela	University of Melbourne with Union Theatre Repertory Company (also Assistant Stage Manager)
1959	Arms and the Man	Louka	University of Melbourne with Union Theatre Repertory Company (also Assistant Stage Manager)
1959	The Party	Assistant Stage Manager	University of Melbourne with Union Theatre Repertory Company
1959	Venus Observed	Assistant Stage Manager	University of Melbourne with Union Theatre Repertory Company
1959	The Rape of the Belt	Diasta	University of Melbourne with Union Theatre Repertory Company (also Assistant Stage Manager)
1959	The Ghost Train	Peggy Murdock	University of Melbourne with Union Theatre Repertory Company (also Assistant Stage Manager)
1959–1960	Sweeney Todd	The lady in tights	University of Melbourne with Union Theatre Repertory Company (also Assistant Stage Manager)
1960	Prisoners' Country	Aboriginal woman	University of Melbourne with Union Theatre Repertory Company (also Assistant Stage Manager)
1960	The Entertainer	Assistant Stage Manager	University of Melbourne with Union Theatre Repertory Company
1960	Look Who's Here!	Assistant Stage Manager	Russell Street Theatre, Melbourne with Union Theatre Repertory Company
1962	The Season at Sarsaparilla	Judy Pogson	University of Melbourne with Union Theatre Repertory Company
1963	The No Hopers		Australian regional tour with Union Theatre Repertory Company
1963	Goodnight Mrs. Puffin	Jacqueline Fordyce	Comedy Theatre, Melbourne with J. C. Williamson's
	Painting on Wood		International Theatre Company of The Seventh Seal
1966	The Rehearsal	Lucile	Little Theatre Club, London with Theatrescope
1966	Little Brother, Little Sister	Madam	Little Theatre Club, London with Theatrescope
1966	A Pretty Row of Pretty Ribbons	The Young Girl	Little Theatre Club, London with Theatrescope
1966	The Knack	Nancy	Russell Street Theatre, Melbourne with Union Theatre Repertory Company
1967	A Flea in Her Ear	Raymonde	Russell Street Theatre, Melbourne, Canberra Theatre with Melbourne Theatre Company
1967	The Servant of Two Masters	Clarice	Russell Street Theatre, Melbourne with Union Theatre Repertory Company
1967	Moby Dick—Rehearsed	Pip	Russell Street Theatre, Melbourne with Union Theatre Repertory Company
1967	O		La Mama, Melbourne
1967	The Heiress	Marian Almond	Russell Street Theatre, Melbourne with Union Theatre Repertory Company
1967	Just Before the Honeymoon		La Mama, Melbourne
1967	Rhinoceros		Russell Street Theatre, Melbourne with Union Theatre Repertory Company
1967	Death of a Salesman		Russell Street Theatre, Melbourne with Union Theatre Repertory Company
1968	The Crucible	Mary Warren	Russell Street Theatre, Melbourne, Canberra Theatre, Tasmania with MTC
1968	The Magistrate	Charlotte	Russell Street Theatre, Melbourne, Canberra Theatre, Mildura Arts Centre, Broken Hill, The King's Theatre, Mt Gambier, Adelaide Teachers College Theatre with MTC
1968	The Prime of Miss Jean Brodie	Sandy	Russell Street Theatre, Melbourne with MTC
1968	Three Sisters	Irina	Russell Street Theatre, Melbourne with MTC
1968	A Day in the Death of Joe Egg	Sheila	Theatre Royal, Hobart, The Little Theatre, Launceston, Russell Street Theatre, Melbourne with MTC
1969	The Country Wife	Margery Pinchwife	Russell Street Theatre, Melbourne, Canberra Theatre with MTC
1970	You're a Good Man, Charlie Brown	Lucy	Playbox Theatre, Sydney with Harry M. Miller
1970	Face of a Man		Majestic Cinemas, Sydney
1972	The Taming of the Shrew	Katherina	Parade Theatre, Sydney with Old Tote Theatre Company
1974	The Importance of Being Earnest	Gwendolyn	St Martins Theatre, Melbourne with MTC
1974	The Sea		Russell Street Theatre, Melbourne with MTC
1974	Pericles, Prince of Tyre	Marina	Russell Street Theatre, Melbourne with MTC
1974	The Misanthrope	Celemene	St Martins Theatre, Melbourne with MTC
1974	London Assurance	Grace	St Martins Theatre, Melbourne with MTC
1975	Trelawney of the Wells	Rose Trelawney	Sydney Theatre Company
1976	Travesties	Gwendolen Carr	Nimrod Theatre, Sydney
1976	A Handful of Friends	Jill	Playhouse, Adelaide, Russell Street Theatre, Melbourne with South Australian Theatre Company
1976	Old King Cole	Princess Daphne	Playhouse, Adelaide with South Australian Theatre Company
	As You Like It	Phoebe	South Australian Theatre Company
1977	Doctor in Love	Nikki	Her Majesty's Theatre, Brisbane, Theatre Royal, Sydney, Canberra Theatre, Theatre Royal, Hobart with J. C. Williamson's
1979	Old Times	Anna	Liverpool Playhouse
1979	Absent Friends	Diane	Liverpool Playhouse
1979	A Flea in Her Ear	Raymonde	Liverpool Playhouse
	Uncle Vanya	Sonya	Sydney Theatre Company
	Tartuffe	Marianne	Sydney Theatre Company
1985	The Real Thing	Charlotte	Sydney Opera House with STC
2004	Afterplay	Sonya	Fortyfivedownstairs, Melbourne with Stable Productions
