= The Cell (play) =

Play by Robert Wales

- Original language: English
- Written by: Robert Wales

Premiere
- Date: 28 April 1966
- Place: Independent Theatre, Sydney

The Cell is an Australian play by Robert Wales. The setting is in a school for delinquent girls.

== Background ==
The play debuted in 1966.

The play was published in 1971.

== 1968 Australian TV version ==
It was adapted for television by the ABC in 1968, directed by John Croyston, and broadcast as part of the Seek and Destroy series. That was a short lived anthology series which consisted of four BBC plays and one Australian play - The Cell was the Australian play.

Australian TV drama was relatively rare at the time. The Cell was made when Australian TV stations were investing less in TV plays and more in serials.

=== Plot ===
Sister Catherine is in charge of a school for delinquent girls. She resents being passed over as Mother Superior of the Convent. When the new Mother Superior, Mother Denis, arrives, there is a clash of personalities between the two. This is heightened when Sister Catherine sides with a young nun, Sister Lenora, who has broken the discipline of the convent. When the Mother Superior dies, Sister Catherine, who was in charge of the convent infirmary and drugs, comes under suspicion.

=== Cast ===
- Ruth Cracknell as Sister Catherine
- June Winchester as Mother Denis
- Betty Lucas as Sister Lenora
- Don Crosby

=== Production ===
Croyston decided to film the action all in one take "to enable the cast to hold the edge of emotional distraction".

=== Reception ===
The Sydney Morning Herald called the production "a victory for the local industry".

The same reviewer later called it one of the best TV plays of the year saying "for writing and execution this play had class, high class."

== 1968 British version ==
It was also adapted for television by the BBC in England as A Swallow's Nest in 1968.
