= Hot Ice (1987 film) =

- Written by: Tony Wager
- Directed by: Brian Phillips
- Starring: Vincent Ball; Peter Sumner
- Country of origin: Australia
- Original language: English

Production
- Producer: Pamela Borain
- Running time: 100 mins
- Production company: Falcon Films

Original release
- Release: 1987

Hot Ice is a 1987 Australian film about a private detective written by Tony Warner.
