= Spring-Heeled Jack (play) =

British play by Geoffrey Carlile and Tod Slaughter

Spring-Heeled Jack or The Terror of Epping Forest is a 1950 British play by the writer Geoffrey Carlile and the actor-manager Tod Slaughter who was known for his villainous roles in melodramatic productions.

It is based on the Victorian legend of Spring-Heeled Jack, and is set during the Napoleonic Wars on the edge of Epping Forest. The play was inspired by Slaughter's role in the film The Curse of the Wraydons (1946), featuring Spring-Heeled Jack which had been based on an earlier stage play.

== Bibliography ==
- Bell, Karl. The Legend of Spring-heeled Jack: Victorian Urban Folklore and Popular Cultures. Boydell Press, 2012.
