= The Shifting Heart =

1957 play by Richard Beynon and 1962 Australian film

- Original language: English
- Written by: Richard Beynon
- Setting: Christmas Eve 1956, Collingwood, Melbourne

Premiere
- Date: October 1957
- Place: Elizabethan Theatre, Sydney

The Shifting Heart is a play written in 1957 in Australia by Richard Beynon, it is an insight to the psychology of racism and its victims. In the background of 1950s Collingwood, Melbourne.

It has been called "the second most famous Australian play of the 1950s."

== Characters ==
- Momma Bianchi
- Poppa Bianchi
- Gino Bianchi
- Maria Bianchi (Fowler)
- Clarry Fowler
- Leila Pratt
- Donny Pratt
- Detective-Sergeant Lukie

== Setting ==
The Shifting Heart is set in 1956, Collingwood, Melbourne on Christmas Eve. At the time, Collingwood was a poor suburb populated by lower class Australian families and Italian immigrants.

The play published in 1960 by Angus & Robertson begins with two pages of stage direction. It describes the home of Italians Mr. & Mrs. Vicenzo Bianchi, the stage is their backyard. On stage left there is a large garbage can that is overfilled, the overflow is in a small household bucket. On each side of the stage is the wall of the neighbours.

On stage left is the wall between the Pratt family, Leila and Donny. The wall is a fence that relaxes in the wind and shows an air of dilapidation. The boards are able to be pushed apart enough to let the Pratts enter the Bianchis' backyard.

On stage right there is a wall described as a formidable barrier, complete with a length of barbed wire across the top. It is low enough for the woman living there to toss garbage over. In the first pages of dialog and notes in the stage direction, it is clear that there is a "war" going on between the family living stage right against the Bianchis because they are Italian. The Pratt family is on the side of the Bianchi family.

== Productions ==
The play came third in a play writing competition held by London's Observer newspaper.

The Shifting Heart premiered at the Elizabethan Theatre in Sydney in October 1957, presented by the Australian Elizabethan Theatre Trust. It toured nationally for a year, including seasons at the Comedy Theatre in Melbourne and Her Majesty’s Theatre in Brisbane.

The play debuted in England in 1959 where it played a West End season at the Duke of York's Theatre.

The ABC made a radio version of the play in 1962. It was adapted for Australian television on the ABC in 1968.

Notable revivals include those of Melbourne's Union Theatre Repertory Company in 1962, Sydney's Marian Street Theatre in 1981, Sydney's Phillip Street Theatre in 1984, and the State Theatre Company of South Australia in 1996.

== 1962 TV adaptation ==
The play was filmed by British TV in 1962.

It screened for the General Motors Hour in Australia on 1 September 1962.

=== Cast ===
- June Brunell as Maria
- Lewis Flander as Gino Bianchi
- John Lee as Det.-Sgt Lukie
- Reg Lye as Donny Pratt
- Keith Michell as Clarry
- Victor Platt as Poppa Bianchi
- Madge Ryan as Leila Pratt
- Gillian Webb as Momma Bianchi

== 1968 TV adaptation ==
The play was filmed for TV in 1968 and aired on 21 August 1968 (Melbourne) as part of Wednesday Theatre. It starred Anne Charleston and Tom Oliver, who later worked together on the TV series Neighbours.

Madge Ryan appeared in the premiere season of the play as Leila.

=== Cast ===
- Madge Ryan as Momma
- Alan Bickford as Gino
- Tom Oliver as Clarrie
- Anne Charleston as Maria
- Syd Conabere as Poppa
- Penny Shelton as Leila
- Terry Norris as Donny
- Blair Edgar as Lukie
- Berys Marsh

=== Reception ===
The Age said "the entirety works despite some stray accents."

Filmink argued "the play is ideal for television because it mostly takes place in a cramped, working class house. It’s a faithful adaptation, and is mostly shot like a stage play, with a few location scenes thrown in" adding "The big stumbling block of the TV version... was the fact that all the Italian roles are played by non-Italian actors who use broad accents for their parts."
