= Done Away with It =

- Australian Playhouse episode
- Episode no.: Season 1 Episode 16
- Directed by: Henri Safran
- Teleplay by: Pat Flower
- Original air date: 1 August 1966
- Running time: 30 mins

Episode chronology
← Previous "The Final Factor"	Next → "Blind Balance"

"Done Away With It" is the 16th television play episode of the first season of the Australian anthology television series Australian Playhouse. "Done Away With It" was written by Pat Flower and directed by Henri Safran and originally aired on ABC on 1 August 1966.

Flower wrote the episode in a weekend.

== Plot ==
A man (Alexander Hay) plans to murder his rich wife Rosa (Irene Sims). He winds up killing three others instead before his wife turns the tables.

== Cast ==
- Alexander Hay as Harvey Monroe
- Irene Sims as Rosa Monroe
- Willie Fennell as Rosa's father
- Reg Cannon as Joe, the gardener
- Janie Stewart as Lucy, the maid
- Tom Oliver as Mr Carruthers
- Rob Inglis as Mr Henderson
- John Gregg as Fallon

== Production ==
Pat Flower wrote Easy Terms and The Lace Counter for theatre. They were recommended to the ABC's Australian Playhouse. Flower wrote them this play in a weekend.

It was shot on location in Sydney and at the ABC Gore Hill Studios. During filming armed guards were needed to watch a scene involving $70,000 worth of jewels.

== Reception ==
The Sydney Morning Herald said there was "originality in the presentation of the play... and for that reason it can be counted among the more interesting" of the series, saying "the conception of combining a technique reminiscent of the old silent films with that of contemporary television production was cleverly contrived.... This story, banal and completely improbable in itself, was acceptable owing to the slick production in the hands of Henri Safran. some effective photography and not least Miss Flower's constructive ability."

Another critic from the same paper praised Flower for "her clever bit of something-out-of-nothing" but most of all Safran "for easily the year's most inventive production work. With a tongue-in-cheek combination of stills and action, he made this lightweight piece into a halfhour comedy gem."

The Canberra Times praised the "taut writing... and fast and furious directing... Using The Avengers technique of whirling cameras, flash backs, stills and exotic means of destruction such as perfume containers loaded with a poison dart and exploding chrysanthemums, the play certainly made the grade in technique. The ABC obviously let its head go with this one 011 sets, scenery and props."

Another critic called it "a shocker".

The Age said "the theme is amusingly clever" and praised the direction.

The same paper at the end of the year called it "a witty bit of nonsense" adding it was one of the best TV plays of the year.
