= Should the Woman Pay =

- Australian Playhouse episode
- Episode no.: Season 1 Episode 13
- Directed by: Patrick Barton
- Teleplay by: Monte Miller
- Original air date: 11 July 1966
- Running time: 30 mins

Episode chronology
← Previous "Anonymous"	Next → "Marleen"

"Should the Woman Pay" is the 13th television play episode of the first season of the anthology television series Australian Playhouse. "Should the Woman Pay" was written by Monte Miller and directed by Patrick Barton. and originally aired on ABC on 11 July 1966.

== Plot ==
A husband returns home to find his wife Marcia living with another man. He uses the law to maintain himself.

== Cast ==
- Marcella Burgoyne as Marcia Henderson
- Wynn Roberts as the husband Gerald Henderson
- Brian Burton as Steven Bentley
- John Paton as Markham
- Ray Angel as taxi driver

== Production ==
It was written by Monte Miller, the Police Prosecutor from Bathurst. He wrote it as an exercise for a course in TV writing held at Orange by the University of Sydney Adult Education Department. (The same course also produced No Dogs on Diamond Street).

== Reception ==
The Canberra Times called it :a clever idea, and I liked particularly the bright opening with music, and the polished performance by Marcella Burgoyne.

The Sydney Morning Herald wrote that "although the play's triviality was not enhanced by any notable show of wit the author has capably dressed up the little plot, with dialogue which consistently keeps the note of casual comedy. Most of the entertainment came from the delightfully relaxed acting of Wynn Roberts as the artist husband who quietly and amiably traps his rival in his wife's flat."
