= Should the Woman Pay? =

- Australian Playhouse episode
- Episode no.: Season 1 Episode 13
- Directed by: Patrick Barton
- Teleplay by: Monte Miller
- Original air date: 11 July 1966
- Running time: 30 mins

Episode chronology
| ← Previous "The Parking Ticket" | Next → "Marleen" |

"Should the Woman Pay?" is the 13th television play episode of the first season of the Australian anthology television series Australian Playhouse. Originally aired on ABC on 11 July 1966

== Premise ==
A husband returns home after a long absence to find a lover living with his wife. He decides to stay and insist his wife support him.

== Cast ==
- Wynn Roberts as the husband
- Marcella Burgoyne as the wife
- Brian Burton as the lover
- Ray Angel
- John Paton

== Reception ==
The TV critic for The Sydney Morning Herald thought the central situation "was as light and idle as its background of discreet dinner dance music... Although the play's triviality was not enhanced by any notable show of wit the author has capably dressed up the little plot, with dialogue which consistently keeps the note of casual comedy. Most of the entertainment came from the delightfully relaxed acting of Wynn Roberts."

The Age said the story "was thin, and at times rather obscure" but praised Roberts' performance.
