= Ring Out Wild Bells (Wednesday Theatre) =

- Wednesday Theatre episode
- Episode no.: Season 1 Episode 6
- Directed by: Robert Cubbage; Wilf Buckner
- Based on: Ring Out Wild Bells by George Landen Dann
- Original air date: 11 November 1964
- Running time: 50 mins

Episode chronology
| ← Previous "Othello" | Next → "Stalingrad" |

"Ring Out Wild Bells" is a 1965 Australian television play which aired as part of Wednesday Theatre. It was based on a play by George Landen Dann and the third Brisbane produced ABC drama from ABQ after Vacancy in Vaughan Street and Dark Brown. "Ring Out Wild Bells" aired on 11 November 1964 in Brisbane, 10 February 1965 in Sydney and Canberra, and on July 1, 1965 in Melbourne.

== Plot ==
Conflict emerges between a minister, Reverend Stephen Millcote, and race promoter Peter Lambert. Millcote is trying to conduct marriage services on Saturday afternoons while Lambert is running race meetings, complete with loudspeaker commentaries, from close by. Matters are complicated by the fact that Millcote's daughter is in love with Lambert's son.

== Cast ==
- Edward Howell as Reverend Stephen Millcote
- Betty Ross as Pamela Millcote, Millcote's sister and horse racing fan
- James Stevens as Peter Lambert
- Alistair Smart as John Lambert
- Monica Smith as Judy Millcote
- Gwen Wheeler as Alice Lambert
- Beverly Bates as Beverly
- Larry Pratt as announcer

== Production ==
It was based on the 1958 play by George Landen Dann. It was Dann's first TV play produced although he had written a number of radio and stage plays. It aired in Melbourne the same week as another Brisbane shot play, The Quiet Season.

It was filmed at the ABC's Brisbane studios in Toowong and broadcast in Brisbane. All the cast were local Brisbane actors except for Edward Howell; this was his 45th TV play. Betty Ross was experienced in Brisbane theatre. Larry Pratt the ABC radio announcer provided his voice for the role of the race caller.

== Reception ==
The Sydney Morning Herald said "its dialogue consisted of a great deal of characterless and self consciously conventional prattle which reduced the play to the level of a soap opera domestic upheaval and gave the Brisbane cast of actors no chance of proving themselves. The standards were close to church hall dramatics and only in Edward Howell was it possible to recognise an authoritative actor who had succeeded in kindling the beginnings of a live part out of the cardboard figure of the vicar."

== See also ==
- Vacancy in Vaughan Street (1963)
- Dark Brown (1963)
- The Quiet Season (1965)
- The Absence of Mr Sugden (1965)
- Arabesque for Atoms (1965)
- A Sleep of Prisoners (1961)
- The Monkey Cage (1966)
