= The Empty Day =

- Australian Playhouse episode
- Episode no.: Season 1 Episode 22
- Teleplay by: Pat Flower
- Original air date: 12 September 1966
- Running time: 30 mins

Episode chronology
← Previous "The Voice"	Next → "The Decision"

"The Empty Day" is the 22nd television play episode of the first season of the Australian anthology television series Australian Playhouse. "The Empty Day" was written by Pat Flower and produced by John Croyston and originally aired on ABC on 12 September 1966 in Sydney and Melbourne, and on 17 October 1966 in Brisbane.

== Plot ==
Sixteen year old Jennifer, alone in her aunt's apartment, invites a strange man inside, believing him to be a friend of the family. They have too much to drink, the man attempts to seduce her, but recovers his manners.

== Cast ==
- Liza Goddard as Jennifer
- Stanley Walsh as the stranger

== Reception ==
The Sydney Morning Herald said Goddard's performance had "intensity, freshness and vigour" and said she was "ably partnered" by Stanley Walsh but thought the script did not make it "clear whether he was an alcoholic, a sex maniac or merely a stupid twerp."

The Sunday The Sydney Morning Herald said "it was not Miss Flower's best effort by a long shot. In fact, its plot had enough holes to sink a battleship. The fact it didn't sink and sustained suspense was partly due to some crafty writing but mostly due to the performances in the cast."

The Canberra Times said the play was "another triumph for" Goddard which "emphasised the fact that producers have to cast her in plays of high enough standard to do her justice. In the classics Point of Departure and Antigone, this young actress was challenged by the quality of the plays. The challenge in The Empty Day was to lift a tautly-written but improbable play... into tense reality."
