= John Gregg (actor) =

Australian actor (1939–2021)

- Born: John David Gregg; January 12, 1939; Campbell Town, Tasmania Australia
- Died: 29 May 2021 (aged 82); Sydney, New South Wales, Australia
- Education: National Institute of Dramatic Art
- Occupations: Actor, voiceover artist
- Years active: 1959–2022
- Known for: Contrabandits; Delta; Doctor Who

John Gregg (12 January 1939 – 29 May 2021) was an Australian actor, whose credits span six decades.

== Early life ==
Gregg was born on a dairy farm in Campbell Town, a remote rural district in southern Tasmania. In his early years he milked cows and ploughed fields for neighbouring farms, and was interested in Aussie Rules football, cricket and rowing.

When Gregg began taking public speaking lessons, his teacher, a graduate of Royal Academy of Dramatic Art, suggested he could find success as an actor. He subsequently auditioned for Sydney's newly formed National Institute of Dramatic Art (NIDA) at the age of 18, performing a monologue from Richard III at the school's Hobart auditions. He was accepted – knowing nothing about theatre and never having even seen a play. He began studying with the school's first intake of students in 1959, alongside Robyn Nevin, Elspeth Ballantyne, Elaine Cusack, Teddy Hodgeman and Peter Couchman.

== Career ==
After graduating from NIDA, Gregg was chosen, alongside fellow classmate Robyn Nevin, to work with the Elizabethan Theatre Trust. He appeared in The Merchant of Venice with the John Alden Shakespeare Company in 1961, and then performed with Melbourne Theatre Company for a season, before making his television debut in a 1964 episode of Consider Your Verdict. That same year, he starred in an ABC TV play of Othello. In 1965, he played Gavin Turley in the miniseries My Brother Jack.

From the 1960s, Gregg also worked with the newly formed ABC drama department, with an ongoing role as Charles Keally in drama series Contrabandits from 1967 to 1968. and the lead role of Jeff Mallow in Delta in 1969, while continuing to work in theatre. Other television credits around that time included Australian Playhouse, Wandjina!, Adventures of the Seaspray, Hunter, Riptide and Dynasty.

In the early 1970s, Gregg headed to London to further his acting career, appearing in a 1972 stage of Jumpers at London's Royal Court Theatre opposite Diana Rigg. He spent two years with London's Royal National Theatre, where he took over the role of Edmund from Ronald Pickup in a 1971 production of Long Day's Journey into Night, appearing alongside Laurence Olivier. He also landed television work, including playing Lycett in a 1975 story arc of long-running sci-fi series Doctor Who featuring alongside Nigel Havers in Frederic Raphael's 1976 semi-autobiographical miniseries The Glittering Prizes for the BBC, and appearing in 1978 political drama miniseries Disraeli: Portrait of a Romantic.

On his return to Australia towards the end of the decade, Gregg had a guest role in Chopper Squad, before landing the main role of talkback radio host Steve Black in The Oracle in 1979. He then continued to alternate between the UK and Australia.

Gregg appeared as Philip Lawson in 1982 film Heatwave, with Judy Davis and Bill Hunter. In 1984, he landed the role of cricket legend and journalist Percy Fender in 1984 miniseries Bodyline and appeared in TV movie Crime of the Decade. That same year, he played Jason in a stage production of Medea, at the Melbourne Arts Centre. The following year he had a role in 1985 TV movie Bootleg, before going on to portray botanist Joseph Banks in miniseries Captain James Cook, and featuring in Travelling North, both in 1987. He then performed in Victoria State Opera's production of My Fair Lady in 1988.

Gregg continued to appear in Australian television series throughout the 1980s and 1990s, including A Country Practice, Rafferty's Rules, Cluedo, G.P., Heartbreak High, Grass Roots and Home and Away. He appeared in 1994 thriller Ebbtide with Harry Hamlin and 1997 TV movie The Ripper with Patrick Bergin and Gabrielle Anwar. The following year he had a recurring role as Dr Peter Michaels in medical series Medivac. He followed this with a regular role as Alan Carson in teen drama series Heartbreak High in 1999.

In 2001, Gregg appeared opposite Kiefer Sutherland and Robert Carlyle in the WWII drama film To End All Wars. The following year, he had a role alongside Craig McLachlan in TV movie Heroes' Mountain, the true story of the 1997 Thredbo landslide and the rescue of Stuart Diver. He also reunited with Robert Carlyle in political drama film Black and White, which also starred Charles Dance and Ben Mendelsohn.

Gregg's later television credits included Rake, Crownies, Old School and Operation Buffalo. He made appearances in miniseries Power Games: The Packer–Murdoch War and House of Bond. He was also a voiceover artist for advertisements and recorded five novels for ABC Radio.

Gregg was Chair of the Actors Benevolent Fund (ABF) for six years from 2013, having joined the Committee in 2008, succeeding actress Noeline Brown. He passed the position on to actor Bruce Spence in 2019, upon his retirement.

== Personal life ==
Gregg met his future wife Jane Seldon on the set of David Hare's 1991 production of Racing Demon at Sydney Theatre Company, where Seldon was working as Wardrobe Mistress. The couple had four children – Sophie Gregg (who is also an actor), Alice, Ben and Sam, and eight grandchildren, as well as two stepsons and step-grandchildren.

Gregg was a long-time ambassador of the Sydney Swans AFL football club.

== Death ==
Gregg died on 29 May 2021, aged 82.

== Filmography ==
=== Film ===
Year	Title	Role	Notes	Ref
1964	From the Tropics to the Snow		Short film	
1982	Heatwave	Philip Lawson	Feature film	
1985	Burke & Wills	Alfred Erwin	Feature film	
1985	Bootleg	T.C. Brown	Feature film	
1987	Travelling North	Jim	Feature film	
1988	Two Brothers Running	Nelson	Feature film	
1991	Deadly	Minister	Feature film	
1994	Ebbtide	Chalmers	Feature film	
1996	Turning April	Attorney-General	Feature film	
2001	To End All Wars	Camp Doctor Coates	Feature film	
2002	Black and White	Rohan Rivett	Feature film	
2008	The View from Greenhaven	Tobe	Feature film	
2018	Wednesday	Farmer	Short film	
2022	A Stitch in Time		Feature film	

=== Television ===
Year	Title	Role	Notes	Ref
1962	The Case of Private Hamp	A Buff's Major	TV movie	
1963	Jonah		1 episode	
1964	Consider Your Verdict	Frisby	1 episode	
1964	Othello	Cassio	TV play	
1965	My Brother Jack	Gavin Turley	Miniseries, 5 episodes	
1965	Tartuffe	Cléante	TV play	
1966	Done Away with It	Fallon	TV play	
1966	The Pigeon	Fallon	TV play	
1966	Twelfth Night	Sir Toby Belch	TV play	
1967	Wandjina!	'Digger' Hilton	1 episode	
1967	Adventures of the Seaspray	Flying Officer Max Barker	1 episode	
1967	Love and War	Curtis	1 episode	
1967–1968	Contrabandits	Charles Keally	22 episodes	
1968	Hunter	Proctor	1 episode	
1969	Riptide	Johnny DeBray	1 episode	
1969–1970	Delta	Jeff Mallow	23 episodes	
1970	Dynasty	Creighton Ransome	1 episode	
1971	Paul Temple	Andy King	1 episode	
1971	Suspicion	Roland	1 episode	
1972	Doomwatch	Roger Halls	1 episode	
1972	Elephant Boy	Burke	1 episode	
1972	Harriet's Back in Town	Charlie	2 episodes	
1972	Dead of Night	Partner	Anthology series, 1 episode	
1973	Special Branch	Sergeant Ramsay	1 episode	
1974	Within These Walls	Tom Phipps	1 episode	
1975	Public Eye	Kane	1 episode	
1975	Doctor Who	Lycett	TV series, Story arc: The Ark in Space, 1 episode	
1976	The Glittering Prizes	Alan Parks	Miniseries, 3 episodes	
1976	Well Anyway	Lawrence	1 episode	
1977	Leap in the Dark	Philip Muirhead	1 episode	
1977	Rooms	Mr Sheppick	6 episodes	
1976–1978	Crown Court	Geoffrey Parnell / Patrick Livingston	8 episodes	
1978	Armchair Thriller	Everly	3 episodes	
1978	Disraeli: Portrait of a Romantic	Lord Robert Cecil / Lord Salisbury	Miniseries, 2 episodes	
1979	Chopper Squad	Jack	1 episode	
1979	The Oracle	Steve Black	Miniseries, 1 episode	
1979	A Place in the World	Peter Paget	Miniseries, 2 episodes	
1979	Shoestring	Jimmy Colefax	1 episode	
1979	Charlie Muffin (aka A Deadly Game)	Australian salesman	TV movie	
1980	A Question of Guilt	Bathurst	2 episodes	
1980	The Gentle Touch	Simon Fox	1 episode	
1980	Jackanory	Storyteller	5 episodes	
1981	The Hitch Hiker's Guide to the Galaxy	Pilot (uncredited)	1 episode	
1981	ITV Playhouse	John	Episode: "Out of Sight, Out of Mind"	
1981	Homicide Squad (aka The Squad)	Det Sgt Don Kinnane	TV movie	
1984	A Country Practice	Harry Gray	2 episodes	
1984	Bodyline	Percy Fender	Miniseries, 7 episodes	
1984	Who Killed Hannah Jane?	William Coyle	TV movie	
1984	Special Squad	Golodkin	1 episode	
1984	Crime of the Decade	Laurie Fletcher	TV movie	
1985	The Fast Lane	Adrian	1 episode	
1986	Tusitala	Cusack-Smith	Miniseries, 3 episodes	
1987–1988	Captain James Cook	Joseph Banks	Miniseries, 4 episodes	
1987–1989	Rafferty's Rules	Baraclough	6 episodes	
1988	Circus	2nd Unicyclist	TV movie	
1989	Trouble in Paradise	Seth	TV movie	
1989	This Man... This Woman	Joe Laurence	Miniseries, 2 episodes	
1989; 2004; 2006	Home and Away	Rev John Newton / Robert Armstrong / Surgeon	7 episodes	
1990	The Flying Doctors	Harry Langford	1 episode	
1991	Boys from the Bush	Melvyn	1 episode	
1991	Chances	Jock	1 episode	
1992	The Last Man Hanged	Journalist	TV movie	
1992	Cluedo	Sebastian Smith	1 episode	
1994	Halifax f.p.	Connolly O'Gorman	1 episode	
1992; 1996	G.P.	Barry Parker	2 episodes	
1997	Roar	Councillor #1	1 episode	
1997	Murder Call	Major Alan Richter	1 episode	
1997	Mirror, Mirror	Reverend Josiah Pinbody	1 episode	
1997	The Ripper	Dr William Gull	TV movie	
1997	The Hostages	Masters	TV movie	
1998	Bullpitt!		1 episode	
1998	Medivac (aka Adrenalin Junkies)	Dr Peter Michaels	8 episodes	
1999	Heartbreak High	Alan Carson	24 episodes	
2000–2003	Grass Roots	Morgan Bartok	7 episodes	
2001	My Husband, My Killer	Allan Saunders	TV movie	
2001	All Saints	Matthew Callan	1 episode	
2001	Farscape	Talyn Lyczac	1 episode	
2001	Changi	Colonel Carter	Miniseries, 1 episode	
2002	Heroes' Mountain	Andrew Donald	TV movie	
2002	Blue Heelers	David Larson	1 episode	
2002	BackBerner	Sir Andrew Waterman	1 episode	
2002	Young Lions	George Quinlan QC / Magistrate	4 episodes	
2004	Jessica	Justice Wall	Miniseries	
2005	Dynasty: The Making of a Guilty Pleasure	Lloyd Bochner	TV movie	
2005	Blue Water High	Dr Jones	1 episode	
2009	Rogue Nation	Sir Joseph Banks	1 episode	
2009	Darwin's Brave New World	Professor Adam Sedgwick	Miniseries, 3 episodes	
2010	Spirited	Priest	1 episode	
2010	Rake	Judge Cummings	3 episodes	
2011	Crownies	Professor McLeod	1 episode	
2012	Underbelly: Badness	Justice Price	1 episode	
2013	Power Games: The Packer–Murdoch War	Calvin Tompkins	Miniseries, 1 episode	
2014	Old School	Felix	2 episodes	
2017	House of Bond	Roger Climpson	Miniseries, 2 episodes	
2018	Fighting Season	Governor	Miniseries, 1 episode	
2020	Operation Buffalo	Prime Minister Anthony Eden	1 episode	

== Theatre ==
Year	Title	Role	Notes	Ref
1959	Our Town		UNSW, Sydney	
1959	Julius Caesar	Citizens, soldiers, messengers, senators etc	Elizabethan Theatre, Sydney	
1959	The Caine Mutiny Court-Martial	Orderly / Lieutenant Stephen Maryk (second cast)	UNSW, Sydney	
1960	The Beautiful People	Owen Webster	UNSW, Sydney	
1960	The Green Pastures	Adam / Third Gambler / Head Magician / Hezdrel	The New Auditorium, Sydney	
1960	Love's Labour's Lost	Lord Dumaine	UNSW, Sydney	
1961	Othello		Sydney Conservatorium of Music, Elizabethan Theatre, Sydney, Cremorne Orpheum, Sydney	
1961	The Merchant of Venice	Shylock	Palace Theatre, Sydney, Sydney Conservatorium of Music, Elizabethan Theatre, Sydney, Cremorne Orpheum, Sydney with John Alden Shakespeare Co	
1961	Macbeth		Sydney Conservatorium of Music, Elizabethan Theatre, Sydney, Cremorne Orpheum, Sydney	
1963	Hamlet		UNSW, Sydney Old Tote Theatre, Sydney	
1963	Camelot	Sir Sagramore	Her Majesty's Theatre, Adelaide	
1965	Pinocchio	Fox	Comedy Theatre, Melbourne	
1966	Chips with Everything		Independent Theatre, Sydney	
1966	The Knack		Russell Street Theatre, Melbourne	
1967	The Servant of Two Masters		Russell Street Theatre, Melbourne	
1967	Incident at Vichy		Russell Street Theatre, Melbourne	
1967	The Right Honourable Gentleman		Russell Street Theatre, Canberra Theatre	
1967	A Flea in Her Ear	Camille Chandebise	Canberra Theatre, Russell Street Theatre, Melbourne, University of Melbourne	
1968	The Crucible		Russell Street Theatre, Canberra Theatre, Tasmania	
1968	The Magistrate		Russell Street Theatre, Melbourne, Canberra Theatre, Mildura Arts Centre, Broken Hill, King's Theatre Mt Gambier, Adelaide Teachers College	
1969	Hamlet	Hamlet	University of Sydney	
1970	The Prince and the Firebird		UNSW Parade Theatre, Sydney	
1970	What the Butler Saw		Russell Street Theatre, Melbourne	
1971	So What About Love?	Dicky	Playhouse Theatre, Perth	
1971	Long Day's Journey into Night	Edmund	Royal National Theatre, London	
1972	Jumpers	Jumper	The Old Vic, London, National Theatre, Lyttelton, Royal Court Theatre, London	
1972	The Great Exhibition	Jerry	Hampstead Theatre, London	
1972–1973	Macbeth	Caithness	Royal National Theatre, London, The Old Vic, London	
1973	The Cherry Orchard	Extra	Royal National Theatre, London, The Old Vic, London	
1973	The Bacchae	Extra	Royal National Theatre, London, The Old Vic, London	
1973	Measure for Measure	Escalus	Harlow Playhouse, The Old Vic, London, Royal National Theatre, London	
1974	Next of Kin	Timothy Hayes	The Alexandra, Birmingham, The Old Vic, London with Royal National Theatre	
1974	The Marriage of Figaro	Double-Main	The Old Vic, London	
1975	Don's Party		Royal Court Theatre, London	
1976	While the Sun Shines	Earl of Harpenden	Theatre Royal, Windsor with Windsor Theatre Co	
1980	Much Ado About Nothing	Don Pedro	Regent's Park Open Air Theatre with New Shakespeare Co	
1980	A Midsummer Night's Dream	Theseus, Duke of Athens	Regent's Park Open Air Theatre, The Tilt Yard, Arundel with New Shakespeare Co	
	The Threepenny Opera		STCSA, Adelaide	
1980–1981	Celluloid Heroes	Mike Fontaine	Nimrod Theatre, Sydney, Theatre Royal, Sydney for Festival of Sydney	
1982	Piaf: The Songs and the Story		Princess Theatre, Melbourne	
1982	The Importance of Being Earnest	John Worthing JP	Marian St Theatre, Sydney, Newcastle Civic Theatre	
1983	The Perfectionist		SGIO Theatre, Brisbane	
1984	Medea	Jason	Melbourne Arts Centre	
1985	Sons of Cain	Rex Harding	Theatre Royal, Sydney, Playhouse, Melbourne with MTC	
1986	Pygmalion		Phillip St Theatre, Sydney	
1988	My Fair Lady	Colonel Pickering	Her Majesty's Theatre, Sydney with Victoria State Opera	
1989	Passion Play		Sydney Opera House	
1990	Henceforward...		Marian St Theatre, Sydney	
1991	Racing Demon		Wharf Theatre, Sydney with STC	
1993	How to Succeed in Business Without Really Trying	Mr Gatch / TV Compere	University of Sydney, Lyric Theatre Sydney, His Majesty's Theatre, Perth	
1994	Underwear, Perfume and Crash Helmet	Lionel	Malthouse Theatre, Melbourne	
1995	Honour	George	Malthouse Theatre, Melbourne	
1996	Coriolanus	Cominius	Melbourne Athenaeum, Sydney Opera House, Canberra Theatre	
2003	These People		Wharf Theatre, Sydney	
2004–2005	Flatfoot	Crassus Dives	Australian national tour	
2008	Renaissance	Leonardo Da Vinci	Old Fitz Theatre, Sydney	
2008	The Happy Prince	The Statue	Newcastle Civic Theatre, Seymour Centre, Sydney	
