= Across the Bridge (Australian Playhouse) =

- Australian Playhouse episode
- Episode no.: Season 1 Episode 27
- Directed by: Pat Alexander
- Teleplay by: Liane Keen
- Original air date: 17 October 1966
- Running time: 30 mins

Episode chronology
← Previous "V.I.P.P."	Next → "Easy Terms"

"Across the Bridge" is the 27th television play episode of the first season of the Australian anthology television series Australian Playhouse. "Across the Bridge" was written by Liane Keen and directed by Pat Alexander and originally aired on ABC on 17 October 1966.

== Plot ==
A man and a divorced woman who live alone in a houseover looking Sydney Harbour meet through the arrangement of mutual friends – and their few hours together open doorways to an understanding both deep and tenuous.

== Cast ==
- Carol Raye as the Woman
- Allan Trevor as the Man
- Tony Ingersent
- Susan Vaughan
- Paula Peters

== Production ==
The episode was shot in Sydney.

== Reception ==
The Age said it "had a pretty thin and somewhat hackneyed theme, but two experienced and talented actors to interpret it." Another reviewer from the same paper said the script "had a strong ring of truth."

Filmink wrote "At times I could not help wondering if the actors were sending up the material... but this was a then-rare depiction of a divorced Australian mother in 1966, looking for love, slobbered over by predators, unsure of her place in the world. For that reason alone, Across the Bridge was worth making and broadcasting."
