= The Heat's On (Australian Playhouse) =

- Australian Playhouse episode
- Episode no.: Season 2 Episode 9
- Teleplay by: Pat Flower
- Original air date: 2 May 1967
- Running time: 30 mins

Episode chronology
← Previous "The Brass Guitar"	Next → "On the Hop"

"The Heat's On" is the ninth television play episode of the second season of the Australian anthology television series Australian Playhouse. "The Heat's On" was written by Pat Flower and originally aired on ABC on 2 May 1967 and on 18 September 1967 in Sydney.

== Plot ==
The jet-set niece of the quixotic Mr Paisley involves him in a tilt with vice at a notorious keep-fit club.

== Cast ==
- Frank Thring
- Susanne Haworth
- Jon Finlayson
- George Whaley
