= Vacancy in Vaughan Street =

1963 Australian television short

- Genre: drama
- Written by: John Crane
- Directed by: Wilf Buckler; Bob Cubbage
- Country of origin: Australia
- Original language: English

Production
- Producers: Bob Cubbage; Fred Haynes
- Running time: 30 mins
- Production company: ABC

Original release
- Network: ABC
- Release: 25 June 1963 (Brisbane)
- Release: 31 July 1963 (Sydney)
- Release: 14 August 1963 (Melbourne)

Vacancy in Vaughn Street is a 1963 Australian television short. It was the first television play produced in Brisbane. and aired on Australian Broadcasting Commission. The same team then made Dark Brown (1963).

== Plot ==
Ernie Pettifer, a carpenter, arrives at a boarding house run by Mrs Jessup and her husband Arthur. He falls in love with straightlaced teacher Florence Medway. Another boarder, Violet, is interested in Ernie.

== Cast ==
- Donald McTaggart as Ernie Pettifer
- Gwen Wheeler as Mrs Jessup
- Toby Harris as Arthur Jessup.
- Judith Stephenson as Florence Medway, a boarder
- Betty Ross as Violent Anderson, another boarder

== Production ==
The production was shot at the studios of the ABQ in Toowong Brisbane. Designer Bernard Hides and his assistant Bill Collyer designed the set, which took three weeks to construct. This meant that for two nights the ABC news in Brisbane was read from the boarding house dining room that featured in the play.

It was produced by Bob Cubbage who said "we chose a simple play to use as an exercise. We wanted to learn as much as we could from it."

Bob Cubbage, ABC Supervisor of Drama and Features in Queensland, said they selected the play because it "has a simple plot and was chosen as a TV exercise for local actors and producers... We hope that this will be the first of a series of local TV productions in Brisbane." It was written by Sydney author John Crane.

Cubbage produced the play to rehearsal stage then director Wilf Buckler took over.

Don McTaggart was a Brisbane actor who mostly worked in radio. He had appeared in A Sleep of Prisoners. Judith Stephenson and Betty Ross were experienced Brisbane stage actors.

== Reception ==
The Sydney Morning Herald called it "pleasantly amusing at best but also containing inconsistencies and some feeble touches."

TV Week called it "a worthy effort and a triumph for all concerned" saying McTaggart "walked off with the acting honors but his supporting cast was a fine one... It makes you wonder why we have had to wait almost four years for this type of programme to emanate from our local studio. This Queensland production is to be seen interstate and our local team need hold no fears for its success."

Other shows shot in Brisbane would include Dark Brown, The Monkey Cage, The Quiet Season and Ring Out Wild Bells. There was also The Absence of Mr Sugden in 1965 starring Edward Howell, Stanley Smith, John Nash, Reg Cameron, Vic Hughes and Don McTaggert, and Arabesque for Atoms (1965) which starred Phillip Colledge, Margret Milne and Alistair Smart. In addition was the 1961 broadcast of A Sleep of Prisoners.

== See also ==
- Roundabout – First television drama short produced in Melbourne
- The Twelve Pound Look – First television drama short produced in Sydney
- The Rose and Crown - first television drama short produced in Perth
