= Dark Brown (1963 film) =

1963 Australian TV film

- Genre: thriller
- Based on: play by Philip Johnson
- Directed by: Bob Cubbage; Wilf Buckler
- Country of origin: Australia
- Original language: English

Production
- Running time: 30 mins
- Production company: ABC

Original release
- Network: ABC
- Release: 4 December 1963 (Brisbane)

Dark Brown is a 1963 Australian TV play. It was based on a British play that had been filmed by the ABC in 1957.

It was the second live drama recorded at the ABC in Brisbane, after Vacancy in Vaughan Street. It was shot at the ABC's studios in Toowong. Australian drama was very rare at the time, and mostly made in Sydney and Melbourne.

== Plot ==
In 1880, Jenny Brown worries about the trips her tobacconist husband Arthur is making to Eastborne to visit his ailing aunt. There are also a series of unsolved murders. The aunt, Mrs Persephelous, visits Jenny.

== Cast ==
- Barbara Wheelton as Jenny Brown
- Ray Dunlop as Arthur Brown
- Babette Stephens as Mrs Persephelous
- Betty Ross as shop clerk Miss Tasker
- Gwen Wheeler as Mrs Collins, Jenny's mother
- Beverly Bates as cousin Bella
- Glen Stirratt as Bella's finance Fred

== Production ==
The sets were designed by Bernard Hides and Bill Collyer. They had to recreate the parlour at the back of Arthur's shop and decided to add the shop as well to give the set better dimensions and to open out the play from its stage origins. The tobacco used was made of peat moss.

The production was taped at the ABC studios in Toowong and that recording was broadcast. During the broadcast and cast re-enacted the play in the studio; they did this without the costumes or sets used during the taping, but just to improve. "We are still inexperienced and we have to make every effort to improve," said Cubbage. Ray Menmuir, ABC director, was in Brisbane on 3 and 4 December to watch the taping and offer suggestions.

== See also ==
- Vacancy in Vaughan Street (1963)
- Crisis (1963)
- The Monkey Cage (1965)
- The Quiet Season (1965)
- Ring Out Wild Bells (1964)
- The Absence of Mr Sugden (1965)
- Arabesque for Atoms (1965)
- A Sleep of Prisoners (1961)
