= The Quiet Season =

- Written by: John Cameron
- Directed by: John Croyston
- Country of origin: Australia
- Original language: English

Production
- Cinematography: Peter White
- Running time: 30 mins
- Production company: ABC

Original release
- Network: ABC
- Release: 2 June 1965 (Brisbane)
- Release: 29 June 1965 (Melbourne)
- Release: 29 June 1965 (Sydney)

The Quiet Season is a 1965 Australian half-hour television play. It aired on the Australian Broadcasting Commission stations Australia-wide and was produced in the Toowong studios of the Brisbane, Queensland, station (ABQ).

This John Croyston production was the fourth play out of ABC Brisbane, following Vacancy in Vaughan Street, Dark Brown and Ring Out Wild Bells.

== Plot ==
Set during the off-season in an Australian fishing town, Shell Bay, "somewhere near Melbourne". A guest house has only one boarder, Harry Nichols. He meets a spinster, Madge, likes her, but flees marriage, returns the next year more determined and finds her unhappily married to someone else, Bill Martin. The guest house is run by Mrs Gray, who is married to Bert and has a daughter Sue.

== Cast ==
- Nonie Stewart as the local shopkeeper Madge
- John Nash as school teacher Harry Nichols
- Reg Cameron as Bill Martin
- Betty Ross as Mrs Gray
- Elaine Cusick (1934-2024) as Sue Gray
- Donald McTaggart as Madge's brother Don
- Vic Hughes as Mrs Gray's husband Bert

== Production ==
It was produced by John Croyston and written by Melbourne writer John Cameron. The outdoor scenes were filmed at Woody Point. Croyston did a location scout of Brisbane's northern suburbs before selecting Woody Point. Beach scenes were shot near Margate.

It was Nonie Stewart's first part since returning from overseas in July 1964. She had left Brisbane for Canada in 1957 and performed in more than fifty shows in Vancouver. The only non local member of the cast was Vic Hughes who was a presenter of Partyland. Filming took place in April 1965.

Elaine Cusick was a Brisbane actress who had worked extensively in radio and theatre and was about to move on to Melbourne when the offer to appear in The Quiet Season was made. Ultimately in Melbourne her appearances in TV productions included The Mystery of the Hansom Cab, The One Day of the Year and The Last Outlaw. It was the first TV role for Reg Cameron and John Nash.

== Reception ==
Air dates varied including 28 June in Canberra and 29 June in Melbourne. Another Brisbane shot play was shown the same week, Ring Out Wild Bells.

The Sydney Morning Herald noted it was the fourth television play to be produced by ABC's Brisbane station, and called it "a horror", comparing it highly unfavourably with the "slick, high professional and sometimes world-class productions" being produced in Sydney at the time.

The Age thought Nash and Stewart "played their parts competently" but felt "it was distracting how abruptly one scene changed into the next. This faulty technique gave a measure of jerkiness to an otherwise smooth performance."

The Bulletin said "Intelligently produced by John Croyston, it [the show] had everything but a good time-slot. It was buried after the late news. The duty announcer urged viewers to stay up for it, and I hope some did. They would have found that “The Quiet Season” was one of those small plays requiring sensitive management, and this Croyston achieved in a masterly way. He also used outside film of trees, rocks and waves to suggest the locale, passages of time, even action which had occurred. The story... is not wildly dramatic material, nor a new plot, but it has poignant, bitter sweet possibilities, and, for once, these were fully realised by the camera and the actors. Often, darting close-ups were used to catch a fleeting expression, a small, quick gesture. Croyston, better known for his radio productions, will be worth watching as a television man."

== Status ==
The National Archives of Australia hold a film copy of this TV short under the title Quiet Season (without the "the"), with 7 May 1965 given as the date, and a running time of 28:46, and notes it has been digitised.

== See also ==
- Vacancy in Vaughn Street
- Dark Brown (1963)
- The Monkey Cage (1965)
- Ring Out Wild Bells (1964)
- The Absence of Mr Sugden (1965)
- Arabesque for Atoms (1965)
- A Sleep of Prisoners (1961)
- Crisis (1963)
