= Watch It (Australian Playhouse) =

- Australian Playhouse episode
- Episode no.: Season 1 Episode 19
- Directed by: Storry Walton
- Teleplay by: Richard Barry
- Original air date: 22 August 1966
- Running time: 30 mins

Episode chronology
← Previous "Haywire"	Next → "Ticket to Nowhere"

"Watch It" is the 19th television play episode of the first season of the Australian anthology television series Australian Playhouse. "Watch It" was written by Richard Barry and directed by Storry Walton and originally aired on ABC on 22 August 1966.

== Plot ==
When watchmaker Ronnie meets a man with a very special wristwatch that "does everything" - it sets his partner Bill on the road to a spell in the cells.

== Cast ==
- John Armstrong as Robbie
- Ed Devereaux as Bill
- Don Crosby
- Edward Hepple
- Beverly Kirk
- Roger Ward

== Production ==
Designer Douglas Smith hired $3,500 worth of watches and clocks. It was reportedly Ed Devereaux's first comedy.

== Reception ==
The Age TV critic said the plot "was rather thin... yet the story had its moments and a dialogue that sparked and entertained. It was even good fun. I should rate it as one of the best in the series."

Filmink said "There are fun moments, superb production design with all those watches."
