= Arabesque for Atoms =

- Genre: drama
- Written by: John Warwick
- Directed by: John Croyston
- Country of origin: Australia
- Original language: English

Production
- Production company: ABC

Original release
- Network: ABC
- Release: 15 September 1965 (Brisbane)

Arabesque for Atoms is a 1965 Australian television play shot in Brisbane.

== Plot ==
An English atomic scientist (Alister Smart) on his way to a Pacific testing site takes refuge in a lonely house in Brisbane. He is visited by a seductress called Stella (Margery Milne).

== Cast ==
- Alister Smart
- Margery Milne
- Phillip College
- Linda Chan

== Production ==
Alister Smart and Margery Milne were married in real life. It was shot at ABC's studios in Toowong with externals filmed in city streets and at Eagle Farm Airport.

The script was also performed on radio.

== See also ==
- Vacancy in Vaughan Street (1963)
- Dark Brown (1963)
- The Quiet Season (1965)
- Ring Out Wild Bells (1964)
- The Absence of Mr Sugden (1965)
- A Sleep of Prisoners (1961)
- The Monkey Cage (1966)
