= John Forrester Awaits the Light =

- Australian Playhouse episode
- Episode no.: Season 2 Episode 8
- Directed by: Eric Taylor
- Teleplay by: Michael Boddy
- Original air date: 11 September 1967
- Running time: 30 mins

Episode chronology
← Previous "The Brass Guitar"	Next → "The Heat's On"

"John Forrester Awaits the Light" is the eighth television play episode of the second season of the Australian anthology television series Australian Playhouse. "John Forrester Awaits the Light" originally aired on ABC on 11 September 1967 in Sydney.

== Plot ==
An ambitious young businessman (Peter Whitford) believes he should test his potential with women but Vera doesn't react to his overtures.

== Cast ==
- Peter Whitford
- June Thody as Vera
- Hugh Scott

== Production ==
It was the first of three plays by Michael Boddy done by Australian Playhouse. It was filmed in Sydney.

== Reception ==
The Sydney Morning Herald said it "falls short on audience involvement."
