= The Absence of Mr Sugden =

- Genre: comedy
- Written by: Ron Harrison
- Directed by: Bob Cubbage
- Country of origin: Australia
- Original language: English

Production
- Running time: 30 mins
- Production company: ABC

Original release
- Network: ABC
- Release: 1965

The Absence of Mr Sugden (also known as In the Absence of Mr. Sugden) is a 1965 Australian TV play. It was the fifth drama to be made at the ABC's Toowong studios, Brisbane, and the second one in 1965. It was shot on 9 December 1965 using an all-male cast of six.

A copy of the production is at the National Archives of Australia.

== Premise ==
Three burglars plan a robbery.

== Cast ==
- Edward Howell
- Stanley Smith
- John Nash
- Don McTaggart
- Reg Cameron
- Vic Hughes

== Production ==
It was written by Sydney writer Ron Harrison and was directed by Bob Cubbage, the ABC's supervisor of drama and features in Queensland. Sydney actor Edward Howell had been in another Brisbane shot play Ring Out Wild Bells.

== See also ==
- Vacancy in Vaughan Street (1963)
- Dark Brown (1963)
- The Quiet Season (1965)
- Ring Out Wild Bells (1965)
- Arabesque for Atoms (1965)
- A Sleep of Prisoners (1961)
- The Monkey Cage (1966)
