= V.I.P.P. =

- Australian Playhouse episode
- Episode no.: Season 1 Episode 26
- Directed by: Brian Faull
- Teleplay by: Pat Flower
- Original air date: 10 October 1966
- Running time: 30 mins

Episode chronology
← Previous "Objector"	Next → "Across the Bridge"

"V.I.P.P." is the 26th television play episode of the first season of the Australian anthology television series Australian Playhouse. "V.I.P.P." was written by Pat Flower and directed by Brian Faull and originally aired on ABC on 10 October 1966.

Flower was one of the leading writers in Australian television at the time.

== Plot ==
A Very Important Political Personage faces a crisis of state. His secretary is Miss Greensleeves. Lady Montpelier runs off with the chauffeur. His wife Effie offers an ultimatum.

== Cast ==
- Raymond Westwell
- Barbara Joss
- Sheila Florance
- Campbell Copelin
- Kurt Ludescher
- Dennis Clinton

== Reception ==
The Age felt the script was full of cliches and wasted the actors "and all those elaborate sets. The ABC should have another look at productions of such little value as this one."

== See also ==
- List of live television plays broadcast on ABC (1956–1969)
