= Blind Balance =

- Australian Playhouse episode
- Episode no.: Season 1 Episode 17
- Teleplay by: Monte Miller
- Original air date: 8 August 1966
- Running time: 30 mins

Episode chronology
← Previous "Done Away with It"	Next → "Haywire"

"Blind Balance" is the 17th television play episode of the first season of the Australian anthology television series Australian Playhouse. "Blind Balance" was written by Monte Miller and originally aired on ABC on 8 August 1966.

== Plot ==
The Blind Balance of Justice weighs out the lives and destinies of two young people, Shirleen and James, whose meeting has brought about personal tragedy.

== Cast ==
- Julie Costello
- Allen Bickford
- Brian James
- Margaret Cruikshank
- Lloyd Cunnington

== Reception ==
The Sydney Morning Herald said it was "enjoyable... in a bitter kind of way."
