= The Parking Ticket =

- Australian Playhouse episode
- Episode no.: Season 1 Episode 12
- Directed by: Eric Tayler
- Teleplay by: Max Colwell; Michael Wright
- Original air date: 4 July 1966
- Running time: 30 mins

Episode chronology
← Previous "Anonymous"	Next → "Should the Woman Pay?"

"The Parking Ticket" is the 12th television play episode of the first season of the Australian anthology television series Australian Playhouse, which consists of 13 half-hour plays, written by Australian authors and created at the ABC-TV's studios. "The Parking Ticket" was written by Max Colwell and Michael Wright and directed by Henri Safran and originally aired on ABC on 4 July 1966. It was one of the first credits for Michael Wright who would die in a car crash in 1969.

== Plot ==
Bob Rankin receives a parking ticket and discovers he lives in a world of aggressive inspectors. The father of a man who has seduced a young woman is given a ticket by the father of the girl.

== Cast ==
- Stewart Ginn as the boy's father
- Lynne Murphy as Muriel
- Shirley MacDonald as Vi
- Charles Little as the boy Denis
- Carmen Duncan
- Willie Fennell as Steve

== Reception ==
The Sydney Morning Herald said it provides "both humour and drama."

The Age called it "a gem".
