= Othello (Wednesday Theatre) =

- Wednesday Theatre episode
- Episode no.: Season 1 Episode 5
- Directed by: Patrick Barton
- Teleplay by: Raymond Westwell; David Bradley
- Based on: Othello by William Shakespeare
- Original air date: 18 November 1964
- Running time: 130 mins

Episode chronology
← Previous "The Bomb"	Next → "Ring Out Wild Bells"

"Othello" is a 1964 Australian television play based on the play by William Shakespeare. It was broadcast on the ABC as part of Wednesday Theatre and filmed in ABC's Melbourne studios. It aired on 18 November 1964 in Melbourne, on 3 February 1965 in Sydney, and on 7 July 1965 in Brisbane.

It was one of the most ambitious projects made in Melbourne, going for over two hours without a break.

== Cast ==
- Raymond Westwell as Othello
- Keith Lee as Iago
- Frances McDonald as Desdemona
- Joan MacArthur as Emilia
- Judith Arthy as Bianca
- John Gregg as Cassio
- Terry Norris as Rodrigo
- Don Crosby as Duke of Vince

== Production ==
Raymond Westwell had played generals on Australian TV in The Angry General and Romanoff and Juliet as well as on stage in Ross. "But Othello the Moor is perhaps the stage's greatest general and a part I have been conceited enough to want to have a go at for years", said Westwell.

The actor had appeared in various productions of the play overseas but this was the first time he had played the title character. He had seen Laurence Olivier, Anthony Quayle and Paul Robeson play the part. "There are a thousand ways of doing this play and many arguments for and against Othello being portrayed either as a Negro or an Arab," said Westwell. "Sir Laurence Olivier played him as a negro and won tremendous acclaim last year. However Patrick Barton and I feel that Shakespeare intended him to be an Arab."

Frances McDonald made her TV debut.

== Reception ==
The Sydney Morning Herald said "the emotional trivialities of the minor characters were excellently handled" but felt Othello was "rather too much an English country gentleman" and Keith Lee played his part "as a man believing in nothing apart from himself."
