= Breakdown (Australian Playhouse) =

- Australian Playhouse episode
- Episode no.: Season 2 Episode 12
- Teleplay by: Michael Boddy
- Original air date: 9 October 1967
- Running time: 30 mins

Episode chronology
← Previous "All Fall Down"	Next → "The Five Sided Triangle"

"Breakdown" is the 12th television play episode of the second season of the Australian anthology television series Australian Playhouse. "Breakdown" was written by Michael Boddy and originally aired on ABC on 9 October 1967.

== Plot ==
The social machine breaks down — first in a late-night suburban train and second in an ancient lift. In both cases the man is faced with impenetrable and frightening problems.

== Cast ==
- Max Meldrum
- George Whaley
