= What About Next Year =

- Australian Playhouse episode
- Episode no.: Season 1 Episode 8
- Directed by: Patrick Barton
- Teleplay by: Richard Lane
- Original air date: 6 June 1966
- Running time: 30 mins

Episode chronology
| ← Previous "Getting Along with the Government" | Next → "Antarctic Four" |

"What About Next Year" is the eighth television play episode of the first season of the Australian anthology television series Australian Playhouse. "What About Next Year" was written by Richard Lane and directed by Patrick Barton and originally aired on ABC on 6 June 1966 in Melbourne and Sydney

== Plot ==
A man, Fred Taylor, investigates the disappearance of a friend, Pete Hayes. He talks to the missing man's wife and daughter, unaware the daughter is insane.

== Cast ==
- Dennis Miller as Fred Taylor
- Terry Aldred as Laura Ogilvie
- Victoria Grace as the daughter
- Edward Howell

== Reception ==
The Sydney Morning Herald called it "an effective suspense play."

The Age felt that, like many Australian Playhouse scripts there was "insufficient time to develop the theme adequately" but thought "the acting was of the same high quality that characterised all the plays in the series."

The Canberra Times said the production "was marred by weak sound, especially in voice production, and there was a singular lack of emotion and reaction from Mrs Laura Ogilvie (Terry Aldred), the mother of the piece" adding "although this play was no masterpiece, it does show that plays can be written for the ABC if they are professionally enough done on those once-taboo subjects, insanity and sex, and "gotten away with" even if they have to be judiciously censored for family viewing."

The Bulletin said the play "creaked in almost every joint. It is bad when the viewer knows that a character moving toward a door is going to pause on the threshold and utter a Significant Statement before he or she exits. As for the significant shotgun blast off set, followed by a re-entry, and the question, “Is he dead?” what could be more pitiful? One can only remark that ABC Television producers are the world's most stubborn in refusing to learn anything from other producers and directors in their own medium. With such direction as one sees in much of “Playhouse,” even a good script would look bad."

== See also ==
- List of television plays broadcast on Australian Broadcasting Corporation (1960s)
