= Ross Thompson (actor) =

Australian actor

- Born: ~1947; Melbourne, Australia
- Occupation: Actor

Ross Thompson is an Australian actor.

Major screen roles he has played include Bellbird as Terry Hill, The Chain Reaction as Heinrich Schmidt, Punishment as prison warder Mike Rogers Carson's Law as Robert Carson, In 1966 he starred in two Australian plays on television, The Pigeon which was filmed for ABC TV's Australian Playhouse and Point of Departure from Wednesday Theatre.

Thompson has a long theatre career working on the likes of The Promise (1968, Independent Theatre) The Steal Away Home (1988, Studio Theatre), The Freedom of the City (1992, National (St Kilda)), Remember Ronald Ryan (1994, Merlyn Theatre) and Abide With Me (1999, La Mama)
