= Objector (Australian Playhouse) =

- Australian Playhouse episode
- Episode no.: Season 1 Episode 25
- Teleplay by: Tony Morphett
- Original air date: 3 October 1966
- Running time: 30 mins

Episode chronology
← Previous "The Lace Counter"	Next → "V.I.P.P."

"Objector" is the 25th television play episode of the first season of the Australian anthology television series Australian Playhouse. "Objector" was written by Tony Morphett and produced by Brian Faull and originally aired on ABC on 3 October 1966.

Morphett went on to become one of the leading writers in Australian television.

== Plot ==
A man is conscripted to fight in Vietnam. He wants to go to court to argue against his conscription and his father, a war veteran, calls him a coward.

== Cast ==
- John Derum as the son
- Syd Conabere as the father
- Julie Costello as the girlfriend

== Production ==
Morphett originally wrote the story as a short story for the Adelaide Festival Literary Contest. It was written soon after the Federal Government introduced conscription for Vietnam, but Morphett says it is not "a propagandist play."

It was filmed in Sydney.

== Reception ==
The Bulletin TV critic said the "play kept wandering from prose poetry to plain Australian and back again, like a novice punter trying to pick a two-horse race without a form guide."

The Age said it was "a drama so true to life it hurt." A different critic from the same paper said it "wasn't really a play. It was merely sort of a visual illustration of a voice told by a narrative in the background. The viewer was supposed to exercise his imagination... An actor is supposed to play a part."

The same paper later called it "a noteworthy example how a dramatist can contribute to a worthy understanding."

Filmink said " As would be expected from a script by Morphett, it’s well constructed, strong drama – one of the best scripts in the whole Australian Playhouse series."

== See also ==
- List of television plays broadcast on Australian Broadcasting Corporation (1960s)
