= The Attack (Australian Playhouse) =

- Australian Playhouse episode
- Episode no.: Season 2 Episode 5
- Directed by: James Davern
- Teleplay by: Kenneth Hayles
- Original air date: 17 July 1967
- Running time: 30 mins

Episode chronology
← Previous "Keep It Clean"	Next → "Enough to Make a Pair of Sailor's Trousers"

"The Attack" is the fifth television play episode of the second season of the Australian anthology television series Australian Playhouse. "The Attack" originally aired on ABC on 17 July 1967 in Melbourne, on 24 July 1967 in Brisbane, and on 21 August 1967 in Sydney.

== Plot ==
In a civil war the loyalties of Yvette are put to the test - and she is forced to decide between the man she loves and her country.

== Cast ==
- Anne Charleston as Yvette
- Brian James
- Jeffrey Hodgson as Joe Lawson
- Tellford Jackson as Sam Parker
- George Mallaby
