= Ticket to Nowhere =

- Australian Playhouse episode
- Episode no.: Season 1 Episode 20
- Directed by: Fred Maxian
- Teleplay by: John Bragg
- Original air date: 29 August 1966
- Running time: 30 mins

Episode chronology
← Previous "Watch It"	Next → "The Voice"

"Ticket to Nowhere" is the 20th television play episode of the first season of the Australian anthology television series Australian Playhouse. "Ticket to Nowhere" was written by John Bragg and directed by Fred Maxian and originally aired on ABC on 29 August 1966.

== Plot ==
A man finds himself with an unusual fellow passenger on a long train journey. He thinks the man is trying to steal his identity.

== Cast ==
- Terry Norris as Fuller
- Wynn Roberts
- Lynne Flanagan as woman who tries to enter the compartment
- Terry McDermott
- Alan Rowe as the ticket collector

== Production ==
Director Fred Maxian normally did variety shows.

== Reception ==
The Age called it "good stage craft. It fitted well into the half hour."

== See also ==
- List of live television plays broadcast on the Australian Broadcasting Corporation (1956–1969)
