= A Touch of Gold =

- Australian Playhouse episode
- Episode no.: Season 2 Episode 1
- Directed by: John Croyston
- Teleplay by: Gwenda Painter
- Original air date: 12 June 1967
- Running time: 30 mins

Episode chronology
← Previous "The Paradise Shanty"	Next → "Slow Poison"

"A Touch of Gold" is the first television play episode of the second season of the Australian anthology television series Australian Playhouse. "A Touch of Gold" was directed by John Croyston and originally aired on ABC on 12 June 1967 in Melbourne and on 24 July 1967 in Sydney.

== Premise ==
In the 1890s a young woman, Edith, struggles to overcome obstacles.

== Cast ==
- Judith Fisher
- Neva Carr Glynn
- Alexander Archdale
- Elizabeth Pusey

== Reception ==
The Sunday The Sydney Morning Herald said it was "beautifully mounted, superbly cast and was a production that could hold its own anywhere."

The Sydney Morning Herald called it "a stock tale but a competent one."

The Age gave it a mediocre review saying "it didn't have the touches to persuade a viewer this series was going to be madly exciting.

== See also ==
- List of live television plays broadcast on ABC (1950–1969)
