= Point of Departure (Wednesday Theatre) =

- Wednesday Theatre episode
- Episode no.: Season 2 Episode 25
- Directed by: Henri Safran
- Teleplay by: play by Jean Anouilh
- Original air date: 22 June 1966
- Running time: 75 mins

Episode chronology
← Previous "Vicky and the Sultan"	Next → "Captain Carvallo"

"Point of Departure" is a 1966 Australian television film. It screened as part of Wednesday Theatre. Australian TV drama was relatively rare at the time. "Point of Departure" aired on 22 June 1966 in Sydney, on 29 June 1966 in Melbourne, and on 27 July 1966 in Brisbane.

It was one of three plays put on by the ABC to commemorate 2,500 years of Greek theatre.

== Plot ==
A boy and a girl meet in a small provincial town at the beginning of German occupation in World War II.

== Cast ==
- Ross Thompson as Orpheus
- Liza Goddard as Eurydice
- Tom Oliver
- Patricia Hill
- Raymond Westwell
- Diana Davidson
- James Condon

== Production ==
Ross Thompson had previously been in The Pigeon for Australian Playhouse. He and Goddard had acted in a scene together in They're a Weird Mob. Point of Departure had a cast of fifteen.

== Reception ==
The Sydney Morning Herald write that Ross Thompson's "sensitive and convincing acting made the best of the obvious weaknesses in the plot itself."

Filmink thought " maybe this is the sort of play that works best on stage, with its slightly fantastical nature and hopping around in time and place."
