= Getting Along with the Government =

- Australian Playhouse episode
- Episode no.: Season 1 Episode 7
- Directed by: John Croyston
- Teleplay by: Colin Free
- Original air date: 30 May 1966
- Running time: 40 mins

Episode chronology
← Previous "Wall to Wall"	Next → "What About Next Year"

"Getting Along with the Government" is the seventh television play episode of the first season of the Australian anthology television series Australian Playhouse. "Getting Along with the Government" was written by Colin Free and directed by John Croyston and originally aired on ABC on 30 May 1966

== Plot ==
A pleasant inefficient "boss", Mr Bigelow (Don Crosby), works at the Government Department for Marketing. He has a devoted secretary (Joan Lord) and an ambitious rival (Allan Trevor). He discovers that he is being visited by an inspector, but the inspector turns out to be an old schoolmate of the boss.

== Cast ==
- Don Crosby as Mr Bigelow
- Allan Trevor
- Joan Lord
- Max Osbiston
- Liza Goddard

== Reception ==
The Sydney Morning Herald called it a "rather banal sketch" which was "well put together and the dialogue often amusing" with "smooth performances".

The Age said it "emphasised the fact that it is not enough for a writer to have an idea. He must know and be able to employ necessary techniques that will be able him to carry it out. This was indeed a theme that required sparkling dialogue and an effective, if light, satiric touch. It missed out because these were just the things it lacked."
