= Romanoff and Juliet =

Romanoff and Juliet may refer to:

- Romanoff and Juliet (play), a 1956 play by Peter Ustinov
- Romanoff and Juliet (1961 film), a film by Peter Ustinov based on his play
- Romanoff and Juliet (Wednesday Theatre), a 1964 Australian television adaptation
