= Wall to Wall (Australian Playhouse) =

- Australian Playhouse episode
- Episode no.: Season 1 Episode 6
- Directed by: Eric Tayler
- Teleplay by: Ann Kinloch
- Original air date: 23 May 1966
- Running time: 30 mins

Guest appearances
- Heather Christie; Gwen Plumb; David Yorston; Don Crosby; Lyndall Barbour

Episode chronology
← Previous "No Dogs on Diamond Street"	Next → "Getting Along with the Government"

"Wall to Wall" is the sixth television play episode of the first season of the Australian anthology television series Australian Playhouse. "Wall to Wall" was written by Ann Kinloch and directed by Eric Tayler and originally aired on ABC on 23 May 1966 It starred Gwen Plumb and was shot in Sydney.

== Plot ==
Elizabeth Fletcher reflects on her lonely life on her birthday. She remembers her one chance at romance, several years previously. She goes to a dance where a man pities her and takes her home, where he is "trapped" by her father.

== Cast ==
- Heather Christie as Elizabeth Fletcher
- Don Crosby as Mr Fletcher
- David Yorston as the Young Man
- Lyndall Barbour as Mrs Fletcher
- Gwen Plumb as the next door neighbour Mrs Cooper

== Background ==
The play had originally been written by Adelaide writer Ann Kinloch for a 1962 competition for Channel Nine drama. However it was not used, the studio making The Valley of Water instead.

== Reception ==
The Sydney Morning Herald thought "the dialogue is so soften stilted and at times too obvious and the author's intentions towards characters or actions are frequently obscure so that after a while one waits for the end in the hope - this time unavailing - that something can be made out of it all."

The Age called it "a bad play... embarrassing as it bellowed and whimpered through a predictable pattern of trite tragedies." Another reviewer in the same paper called it "one of the poorest of the series. The script might have been written by a schoolboy."

The Sunday The Sydney Morning Herald said Gwen Plumg "gets out nod for the week's finest performance" for her work in the show.

The Bulletin called the play "the silliest of all" the episodes of the series.

== See also ==
- List of television plays broadcast on Australian Broadcasting Corporation (1960s)
