= Casualty (Australian Playhouse) =

- Australian Playhouse episode
- Episode no.: Season 2 Episode 3
- Directed by: Storry Walton
- Teleplay by: John Croyston
- Original air date: 3 July 1967
- Running time: 30 mins

Episode chronology
← Previous "Slow Poison"	Next → "Keep It Clean"

"Casualty" is the third television play episode of the second season of the Australian anthology television series Australian Playhouse. "Casualty" was written by John Croyston and originally aired on ABC on 3 July 1967 in Melbourne and on 7 August 1967 in Sydney.

== Premise ==
A story centered around a hospital waiting room.

== Cast ==
- Ben Gabriel
- Shirley Cameron
- Martin Harris
- Bowen Llewellyn
- Ed Nelson

== Reception ==
A reviewer in The Age called it "a waste of viewing time".

Another writer in that paper called it "stylised".

The Sydney Morning Herald complained about Croyston's "airy fairy artsy farsty script".
