= On the Hop =

- Australian Playhouse episode
- Episode no.: Season 2 Episode 10
- Directed by: Pat Alexander
- Teleplay by: Michael Laurence
- Original air date: 17 August 1967
- Running time: 30 mins

Episode chronology
| ← Previous "The Heat's On" | Next → "All Fall Down" |

"On the Hop" is the tenth television play episode of the second season of the Australian anthology television series Australian Playhouse. "On the Hop" originally aired on ABC on 17 August 1967
25 September 1967 (Sydney) and was the first play from actor Michael Laurence.

== Plot ==
Red Ruby, Queen of Wooloomooloo, retired after 15 years in the 'business' when she receives an unusual inheritance – but inheritances are not always what they seem.

== Cast ==
- Shirley Cameron
- Carmen Duncan
- Kevin Manser
- Wendy Blacklock
- Lyn Lae
- Tom Farley
- Elizabeth Kirby

== See also ==
- List of television plays broadcast on Australian Broadcasting Corporation (1960s)
