= The Final Factor =

- Australian Playhouse episode
- Episode no.: Season 1 Episode 15
- Directed by: Ken Hannam
- Teleplay by: John Warwick
- Original air date: 25 July 1966
- Running time: 30 mins

Episode chronology
← Previous "Marleen"	Next → "Done Away with It"

"The Final Factor" is the 15th television play episode of the first season of the Australian anthology television series Australian Playhouse. "The Final Factor" was written by John Warwick and directed by Ken Hannam and originally aired on ABC on 25 July 1966.

== Plot ==
Many lives are at stake while giants of the engineering world struggle for supremacy.

== Cast ==
- Peter O'Shaughnessy as Kruger
- Richard Meikle
- Noel Brophy

== Reception ==
The Sydney Morning Herald wrote "If Australian Playhouse is to be worthy of its name, it needs to find more interesting one-act plays than "The Final Factor,"... Perhaps there was a beginning, a middle and an end but the sequence was unbalanced. The end did not justify the means. Action lacking Lacking any dramatic action visible on the screen —unless one counts telephone conversations—the whole piece consisted of a jumble of dialogue embracing engineering, big business and possible human disaster, and centring around the possible collapse of a bridge in the final stage of its construction. The deciding factor was apparently not so much human agency as the arrival of "cool southern change" some minutes before it was due. It was owing only to the acting of Peter O'Shaughnessy and, to a lesser degree, that of Richard Meikle, that a feeling of tension was built-up—to reach a complete anticlimax which no actor's skill could mitigate."

The Age said "there was plenty of suspense... the dialogue was good and the clash of characters was well drawn."
