= The Decision (Australian Playhouse) =

- Australian Playhouse episode
- Episode no.: Season 1 Episode 23
- Directed by: Oscar Whitbread
- Teleplay by: John Warwick
- Original air date: 19 September 1966
- Running time: 30 mins

Episode chronology
← Previous "The Empty Day"	Next → "The Lace Counter"

"The Decision" is the 23rd television play episode of the first season of the Australian anthology television series Australian Playhouse. "The Decision" was written by John Warwick and directed by Oscar Whitbread and originally aired on ABC on 19 September 1966.

== Plot ==
When public opinion collides with private beliefs in a small town, the result is a tragedy of in tolerance that destroys. A woman is seriously injured in a car accident and requires a blood transfusion, but she refuses on religious grounds. She passes out and the doctor pleads with her husband to give permission. He refuses and the woman dies. The husband is blamed for the wife's death and is shunned by the neighbours.

== Cast ==
- Terry McDermott as the husband Ben Peters
- Patsy King as the wife Sally Peters
- Jon Ewing as Dr Dawkins
- George Mallaby
- Rosalind Seagrave as Nurse Andrews
- Roly Baree as a shopkeeper friend Perry
- Moira Carleton as the disapproving neighbour Mrs Jennings

== Reception ==
The Age called it "an excellent illustration of careful and sustained characterisation... a rare combination of good acting, good writing and good direction."

== See also ==
- List of television plays broadcast on Australian Broadcasting Corporation (1960s)
