= Haywire (Australian Playhouse) =

- Australian Playhouse episode
- Episode no.: Season 1 Episode 18
- Directed by: Pat Alexander
- Teleplay by: Creswick Jenkinson
- Original air date: 15 August 1966
- Running time: 30 mins

Episode chronology
← Previous "Blind Balance"	Next → "Watch It"

"Haywire" is the 18th television play episode of the first season of the Australian anthology television series Australian Playhouse. "Haywire" was written by Creswick Jenkinson and directed by Pat Alexander and originally aired on ABC on 15 August 1966.

== Plot ==
A young art student is followed home by Roscoe, a male model. She is scolded by her sister Joya who believes she can deal with Roscoe but gets trapped by him. She accidentally calls two uni students who are unsure if they are hearing a real call or a radio drama. They eventually decide to find the girl but have trouble locating her.

== Cast ==
- Kit Taylor as uni student
- John Krummel as uni student
- Carolyn Keely as Joya, her elder sister
- Lucia Duchenski as the art student
- David Yorston as Roscoe

== Production ==
It was filmed in Sydney, New South Wales

== Reception ==
The Age called it "ranting melodrama, over obvious and with incident reduced to a minimum."

== See also ==
- List of television plays broadcast on Australian Broadcasting Corporation (1960s)
