= The Tape Recorder =

- Australian Playhouse episode
- Episode no.: Season 1 Episode 2
- Directed by: Henri Safran
- Teleplay by: Pat Flower
- Original air date: 25 April 1966
- Running time: 30 mins

Guest appearance
- Jennifer Wright

Episode chronology
← Previous "The Pigeon"	Next → "The Air-Conditioned Author"

"The Tape Recorder" is the second television play episode of the first season of the Australian anthology television series Australian Playhouse. "The Tape Recorder" was written by Pat Flower and directed by Henri Safran and originally aired on ABC on 25 April 1966.

It was one of the most acclaimed Australian television plays.

== Plot ==
Miss Collins arrives at a flat to start typing a story for a novelist. The flat is empty but the writer has dictated his murder story on to a tape recorder. As she types Miss Collins realises she resembles the central character in the story.

== Cast ==
- Jennifer Wright as Miss Collins
- Wynn Roberts as the voice of the novelist

== Production ==
It was filmed before Christmas in Melbourne in 1965. Jennifer Wright was an English actor living in Melbourne.

Pat Flower wrote it deliberately to keep costs down. It was originally written as a two hander but director Henri Safran persuaded Flower to cut it down to a one-person piece.

David Goddard, who produced the series, said the idea came from a lunch he had with Flower. She accused the ABC of wanting plays with one set, one actor and no dialogue because it could not afford anything else. Goddard said he bet she could not write one like that, so Flower did as a challenge. "It's a beauty," said Goddard. "Mind you, she cheated a little by inserting the tape recorder, if you want to get really academic about this. But the leading character never utters a word. And it holds you. The suspense is so great it makes you want to scream at times. It's a superb piece of drama, set in one room, one person and a tape recorder. And it's a beautiful piece of writing."

== Reception ==
The Sydney Morning Herald critic wrote that "the traditional formula of the short thriller was cleverly used, with never a letup in insidious suspense, and a sharply effective final twist to the story" based on "the alliance between the author's compact, ingenious plot and Henri' Safran's subtle production, which built up a taut, oppressive atmosphere within a single room."

The Age said it "turned into a feat of endurance." Another reviewer from the same paper said "the language was all very much old time melodrama" but thought "the acting was excellent and the settings were perfect."

The Australian Women's Weekly said "it kept me right on the edge of my chair." The Bulletin said it "had its faults" but was "a sight better than many of the mediocre importer series shown during 7pm to 9 pm hours."

The Sunday The Sydney Morning Herald said that with the show "Australian Playhouse proved conclusively and triumphantly that it is a winner. The only question now is . . . where have all these writers been skulking? Have they been hiding under stones? Working on novels? Doing bits for Mavis? Or chewing their nails until a series like this came along? I may be a bit premature in Jumping for joy, but in scoring two hits in a row Australian Playhouse looks as though it might be more than a grab bag."

== Later versions ==
It was also produced by the BBC in 1967 with Guy Doleman and Suzanne Neve. It was the first BBC production to be broadcast in colour. Drew Goddard, producer of Australian Playhouse, called this "a feather in our cap."

It was later produced for television in Canada, Belgium, the United States and Italy. It was also adapted for the stage and is arguably Flower's best known work.

== See also ==
- List of television plays broadcast on Australian Broadcasting Corporation (1960s)
