= The Paradise Shanty =

- Australian Playhouse episode
- Episode no.: Season 1 Episode 30
- Directed by: Patrick Barton
- Teleplay by: Kevin McGrath
- Original air date: 7 November 1966
- Running time: 30 mins

Episode chronology
← Previous "A Small Wonder"	Next → "A Touch of Gold"

"The Paradise Shanty" is the 30th and the finale television play episode of the first season of the Australian anthology television series Australian Playhouse. "The Paradise Shanty" was written by Kevin McGrath and directed by Patrick Barton and originally aired on ABC on 7 November 1966.

== Plot ==
A lone horseman called the Boundary Rider arrives in town. He has a drink and gets sick.

== Cast ==
- Dennis Miller as the Boundary Rider
- Syd Conabere as Riley
- Frank Rich as publican
- Dennis Turnull
- Doug Owen
- Evan Dunstan as customer

== Production ==
It was based on McGrath's play Little Topar which had won first prize at the 1966 Cairns Drama Festival. Frank Rich was a dancer and singer regularly seen on In Melbourne Tonight. It was the last Australian Playhouse for 1966.

== Reception ==
The critic from The Sydney Morning Herald called it "one of the best of the year's output, being a sceptical look at the old mateship tradition and contrasting pathos with crudity and crassness. The story of a lonely ill fated lad was played out among a crude little plot of unfeeling men. A moving show."

The critic added that Australian Playhouse "has disappointed everyone who hoped for a long line of quality TV plays. It has rudely shown us that we can supply studios, crews and players, but we have a depressing shortage of writers. Also, the Playhouse badly needs a more skilled and creative editor-in-chief for 1967. All that said, Playhouse consistently drew audiences by the tens of thousands which means it had more impact on potential drama lovers than any stage theatre in the land."

== See also ==
- List of television plays broadcast on Australian Broadcasting Corporation (1960s)
