= Enough to Make a Pair of Sailor's Trousers =

- Australian Playhouse episode
- Episode no.: Season 2 Episode 6
- Teleplay by: Barbara Vernon
- Original air date: 24 July 1967
- Running time: 30 mins

Episode chronology
| ← Previous "The Attack" | Next → "The Brass Guitar" |

"Enough to Make a Pair of Sailor's Trousers" is the sixth television play episode of the second season of the Australian anthology television series Australian Playhouse. "Enough to Make a Pair of Sailor's Trousers" originally aired on ABC on 24 July 1967 in Melbourne and on 28 August 1967

== Plot ==
Beatrice, a shy and lonely country girl moves to the city. She falls for Henry, a sailor who shows her "a patch of blue".

== Cast ==
- Helen Morse as Beatrice
- Allen Bickford as Henry the sailor
- Heather Christie as Beatrice's sister Irene
- June Prichard
- Gray Shearston
- Mary Mackay
- Judy Banks
- Dalvern Thorn

== Production ==
The title came from the old country saying that when there is enough blue sky to cut out bell bottomed breeches the worst of the storm is over.

It is believed to be the first drama production shot at Garden Island where H.M.A.S. Vendetta, a destroyer, is moored, and also at the Sydney Opera House.

== Reception ==
The Age called it "enjoyable". Filmink called it "charming".
