= The Prowler (Australian Playhouse) =

- Australian Playhouse episode
- Episode no.: Season 1 Episode 4
- Directed by: Alan Burke
- Teleplay by: Pat Flower
- Original air date: 9 May 1966
- Running time: 30 mins

Guest appearances
- Gwen Plumb; Stewart Ginn; Judith Champ; Roger Box; Anthony Thurbon

Episode chronology
← Previous "The Air-Conditioned Author"	Next → "No Dogs on Diamond Street"

"The Prowler" is the fourth television play episode of the first season of the Australian anthology television series Australian Playhouse. "The Prowler" was written by Pat Flower and directed by Alan Burke and originally aired on ABC on 9 May 1966.

== Plot ==
A man, tired of hearing about his wife's dead first husband, decides to resurrect the man when rumours about a prowler begin to circulate.

== Cast ==
- Gwen Plumb as Elsie Hopewell
- Stewart Ginn as her husband Fred
- Judith Champ as Jean Thurston
- Roger Box as Morgan Thurston
- Anthony Thurbon as detective

== Reception ==
The Sydney Morning Herald critic called it "negligible and easily puffed up to pass half an hour at a fairly slow pace; but it was quite entertainingly watchable thanks to Miss Flower's clever way with turns of phrase true to suburban bickering" and some "beautifully relaxed and subtle comedy-acting of Stewart Ginn and Gwen Plumb."

The Sunday The Sydney Morning Herald critic, who thought Flower's "The Tape Recorder" was "brilliant" called "The Prowler" "a miss".

The Age said "the play was well acted and well produced; but it did not add up to anything. It felt as though I had been reading a novel and skipping page after page just to get to the story only to find that it had not been worth the trouble."

== See also ==
- List of television plays broadcast on Australian Broadcasting Corporation (1960s)
