= A Small Wonder =

- Australian Playhouse episode
- Episode no.: Season 1 Episode 29
- Directed by: James Davern
- Teleplay by: Jeff Underhill
- Original air date: 31 October 1966
- Running time: 30 mins

Episode chronology
← Previous "Easy Terms"	Next → "The Paradise Shanty"

"A Small Wonder" is the 29th television play episode of the first season of the Australian anthology television series Australian Playhouse. "A Small Wonder" was written by Jeff Underhill and directed by James Davern and originally aired on ABC on 31 October 1966 in Sydney and Melbourne. and 7 November 1966 in Brisbane.

== Plot ==
George is spending his wedding night with Evelyn. Marriage has come late in life to him, and not under the happiest circumstances, as the woman is pregnant. He has gone to a great deal of trouble to create the right atmosphere, but his bride remains silent. He talks for over 20 minutes. Evelyn says she loves him.

== Cast ==
- Noel Ferrier as George Fisher
- Fay Kelton as Evelyn Fisher
- Joe James

== Production ==
The production marked Noel Ferrier's return to television after an absence, and was his first performance for ABC-TV. It was shot in Melbourne.

== Reception ==
The Sydney Morning Herald said "the script was only a placegetter, but" Noel Ferrier's performance was a "winner."

The Age thought the reveal of the girl's pregnancy should happen earlier.

The Bulletin wrote that "Noel Ferrier, as an uneasy husband who has done the right thing by a girl he imagines must think he is a bad bargain, acts out his psycho-drama while the girl sits and says nothing. After 27 minutes of this she tells him she loves him madly, he says it’s a small wonder. Slow fade. The real wonder was that anyone, probably only me, was still there for the dramatic climax."
