= The Five Sided Triangle =

- Australian Playhouse episode
- Episode no.: Season 2 Episode 13
- Directed by: Brian Faull
- Teleplay by: Brian Faull
- Original air date: 16 October 1967
- Running time: 30 mins

Episode chronology
← Previous "Breakdown"	Next → —

"The Five Sided Triangle" is the 13th and finale television play episode of the second season of the Australian anthology television series Australian Playhouse. "The Five Sided Triangle" was written by Brian Faull. and originally aired on ABC on 16 October 1967 in Sydney

== Plot ==
Mr Caradoc finds that the eternal triangle contains problems of unexpected dimensions. He is a business executive who divides his time between his wife and three mistresses.

== Cast ==
- Raymond Westwell as Mr. Caradoc

== Reception ==
The Age said "it had a confidence, a sureness missing in the other productions of this lamentable series."

Actor Gordon Chater wrote a letter of complaint to the Australian Broadcasting Control Board about the show calling it a "parade of pornography".

== See also ==
- List of live television plays broadcast on ABC (1950–1969)
