= The Air-Conditioned Author =

- Australian Playhouse episode
- Episode no.: Season 1 Episode 3
- Directed by: Henri Safran
- Teleplay by: Colin Free
- Original air date: 2 May 1966
- Running time: 30 mins

Guest appearances
- Richard Meikle; Eric Reiman; Moya O'Sullivan

Episode chronology
| ← Previous "The Tape Recorder" | Next → "The Prowler" |

"The Air-Conditioned Author" is the third television play episode of the first season of the Australian anthology television series Australian Playhouse. "The Air Conditioned Author" was written by Colin Free and directed by Henri Safran and originally aired on ABC on 2 May 1966.

== Plot ==
A novelist, Nicholas Lovatt, becomes disillusioned when his publisher urges him to turn out stereotyped novels.

== Cast ==
- Richard Meikle as Nicholas Lovatt
- Eric Reiman
- Willie Fennell
- Tony Ingersent
- Sue Walker

== Reception ==
The Sydney Morning Herald called it "a comedy that missed because it lacked deft shaping".

The Age called it "shapeless, disconnected and bumpy".

== See also ==
- List of television plays broadcast on Australian Broadcasting Corporation (1960s)
