= Keep It Clean (Australian Playhouse) =

- Australian Playhouse episode
- Episode no.: Season 2 Episode 4
- Teleplay by: E.R. Thomas
- Original air date: 10 July 1967
- Running time: 30 mins

Episode chronology
← Previous "Casualty"	Next → "The Attack"

"Keep It Clean" is the fourth television play episode of the second season of the Australian anthology television series Australian Playhouse. "Keep It Clean" was written by E.R. Thomas and originally aired on ABC on 10 July 1967 in Melbourne and on 14 August 1967 in Sydney

== Plot ==
Two men unknown to each other try to crack a safe in an office building.

== Cast ==
- Barry Creyton as a crooked bank manager
- Edward Howell
- Des Rolfe as janitor

== Production ==
Barry Creyto later recalled "I enjoyed that. I got to play a scheming bank executive intent on robbing the bank vault and inadvertently being locked in it at the end. That was fun to do. By that time, we had tape. We still had to do it in one fell swoop, though."

== Reception ==
The Canberra Times wrote the episode "had situation possibilities, but the plot itself...seemed contrived and rather maiden-auntish." The Age called it "too heavy for even Barry Creyton to lift."
