= All Fall Down (Australian Playhouse) =

- Australian Playhouse episode
- Episode no.: Season 2 Episode 11
- Teleplay by: Michael Boddy
- Original air date: 2 October 1967
- Running time: 30 mins

Episode chronology
← Previous "On the Hop"	Next → "Breakdown"

"All Fall Down" is the 11th television play episode of the second season of the Australian anthology television series Australian Playhouse. It was a comedy and starred the Kessey twins, Katherine and Karen, in roles specifically written for them.

== Synopsis ==
The egotistical Larry co-hosts a TV variety show together with Amanda. Wanting to boost the show's ratings, Larry organises a competition gimmick, the price of which is for someone to appear on the show for a month. Sarah wins, and ends up impressing the sponsor so much that she ends up being hired permanently – resulting in Larry quitting.

== Cast ==
- Barry Creyton as Larry
- Robert McDarra as Ray
- Peter Rowley
- Katherine Kessey as Sarah
- Karen Kessey as Amanda
- Anthony Bazell as Sponsor

== Production ==
Star Barry Creyton later recalled he "didn’t enjoy that... due to ego more than the script, though (laughs). My co-stars where these singing twins, two girls who were popular at the time (Katherine and Karen Kessey). At that time in the ‘60s, I was well enough known to have top billing and they didn’t give it to me, they gave it to the twins, and I was pretty pissed."

== Broadcast ==
"All Fall Down" originally aired on ABC on 2 October 1967.

== Reception ==
The Sydney Morning Herald said it was "a disaster."

Stephen Vagg from FilmInk wrote: "The considerable talents of Barry Creyton, a big star at the time due to his work on The Mavis Bramston Show, is curiously wasted in his stock villain part. Robert McDarra, an excellent actor best remembered for his role in the feature film 27A (1974), and famed for the real-life alcoholism that led to his early death, seems miscast as Ray, the producer with a crush on Amanda." He went on to say: "Still, All Fall Down gets points for novelty."

== See also ==
- List of television plays broadcast on Australian Broadcasting Corporation (1960s)
