= Slow Poison (Australian Playhouse) =

- Australian Playhouse episode
- Episode no.: Season 2 Episode 2
- Directed by: Oscar Whitbread
- Teleplay by: Allan Trevor
- Original air date: 22 April 1967
- Running time: 30 mins

Episode chronology
← Previous "A Touch of Gold"	Next → "Casualty"

"Slow Poison" is the second television play episode of the second season of the Australian anthology television series Australian Playhouse. "Slow Poison" was produced in Melbourne by Oscar Whitbread, written by Allan Trevor. and originally aired on ABC on 22 April 1967, 19 June 1967 in Melbourne and 31 July 1967 in Canberra>.

== Plot ==
A columnist Tim Douglas loses his job and friends.

== Cast ==
- Ray Taylor as Tim Douglas
- Brian James
- Dennis Clinton
- Clive Winmill
- Keith Eden
- Kurt Bleiman

== Reception ==
The Age said it had "a well developed central character" where "Allan Trevor produced a workmanlike script and Oscar Whitbread treated it well with some light touches."

Another viewer from the same paper said it "went septic in the production department and fell on its face elsewhere. Ray Taylor was less than impressive... We know we have good actors and producers... but where are the dramatists?"

== See also ==
- List of television plays broadcast on Australian Broadcasting Corporation (1960s)
