= Antarctic Four =

- Australian Playhouse episode
- The Age ad 13 June 1966
- Episode no.: Season 1 Episode 9
- Directed by: James Davern
- Teleplay by: Oriel Gray
- Original air date: 13 June 1966
- Running time: 30 mins

Episode chronology
← Previous "What About Next Year"	Next → "The Monkey Cage"

"Antarctic Four" is the ninth television play episode of the first season of the Australian anthology television series Australian Playhouse.

"Antarctic Four" was written by Oriel Gray and directed by James Davern and originally aired on ABC on 13 June 1966.

Australian TV drama was relatively rare at the time but there were several productions set in Antarctica in the 1960s, the others including Manhaul and She. "Antarctic Four" was also performed as a stage play.

== Plot ==
A group of six men from the Australian National Antarctic Research Expedition are stranded in an Antarctic outpost. Temporarily out of communication with their base, the men get into a nightmare situation brought on by a mysterious disease.

== Cast ==
- Gordon Boyd
- Kurt Ludescher
- Clive Winmill
- George Whaley
- Terry McDermott
- Terry Gill

== Production ==
Gordon Boyd was best known as a singer.

== Reception ==
The critic from The Australian Women's Weekly said the production "was not flawless, but it sustained suspense to the end. It was better entertainment in every way than there has been from "Australian Playhouse" for weeks. I would like to see this series succeed, but recently I have been wondering whether it would. "Antarctic Four" revived my hopes.

The critic from The Sydney Morning Herald said that "If this fantasy fails to grip or impress, it is not the fault of the production or the players...the most outstanding performance came from George Whaley who had the schizophrenic role of a sane madman."

The Age called it "one of the best of the Playhouse series".
