= The Break (play) =

1962 Australian play by Philip Albright

- Original language: English
- Written by: Philip Albright
- Subject: homosexuality, alcoholism
- Genre: drama
- Setting: flat in Potts Point

Premiere
- Date: February 27, 1962
- Place: Union Theatre, Sydney
- Directed by: John Tasker

The Break is a 1962 Australian play by Philip Albright. Albright was an American writer and actor who had moved to Australia. He died in 1959 and the play debuted after his death. It was an early Australian play to depict homosexuality.

== Plot ==
Laura Masters is preparing her flat for the arrival of Raoul, her ex-husband and father of their 17 year old son, Terry. Her marriage with Raoul broke up because of Laura's drinking. Laura's friend Tom, a doctor, wants to marry her. Her neighbour Sybil goes to AA meetings with Laura, and has a son, Peter, who is friends with Terry.

Raoul wants to take Terry away on a trip. Raoul asks Tom if Peter is "queer" and worries about Terry being raised by Laura. Peter has arranged a date with a girl, Gloria, and wants Terry to date Gloria's friend, Bet. Gloria is attracted to Peter but when she asks him why he doesn't get around with girls much he becomes defensive.

Laura refuses to let Raoul take Terry away, suggesting Raoul move to Australia instead. Raoul turns nasty, lying that Tom is going to marry another girl, and that Tom suggested Terry and Peter are having an affair due to a lack of masculine involvement in Terry's life. Laura is tempted to have a drink and recites the AA prayer then calls Sybil for help. Raoul says he saw Peter with Terry and Laura starts drinking.

Terry and Peter come back having had sex with Gloria and Bet to find Laura drunk. Terry thinks it's because his mother knows that he was with a girl, unaware it's because she thinks he's gay. Raoul suggests Terry go overseas with him and Peter supports this idea. Tom arrives. Eventually Raoul's lies are exposed and Tom punches him. Terry tells his father to leave. Tom and Laura are united.

== Background ==
SMH 27 February 1962

A manuscript dated from 1950 shows that Albright was working on the play well before it debuted.

During rehearsals, direction John Trasker attended an Alcoholics Anonymous meeting for research. He was accompanied by Patrick White, a friend of Trasker's; the experience prompted White to give up drinking for a time.

== Production history ==
The play debuted at the Union Theatre in Sydney in 1962 as part of a series of three new Australian plays under the auspices of the Elizabethan Theatre Trust. The others were Naked Island and Shipwreck.

The season of three Australian plays lost the Trust £9,709.

== Reception ==
Critical reception was poor. The Sydney Morning Herald called it "a worthless piece of sensation-mongering... a play about alcoholism which is also an ill-bred thriller."

In October 1959, the play won equal second prize in Little Theatre Guild competition under the title The Bust. (The winner was Burst of Summer.)

The Bulletin called it "An appalling event. An earnest stupid play which piled incredible situations on to even more unbelievable people, a setting which suggests a flat laid out on nightmarish lines, trite production filled with appropriate cliches of movement and gesture...to provide one of the worst nights in recent theatre."

Leslie Rees felt the play was "written inadequately".

== Cast ==
- Terri Aldred as Laura Masters
- Grant Taylor as Tom
- Allan Trevor as Raoul
- Dennis Carroll as Terry
- Bruce Myles as Peter
- Judith Arthy
- Reyna Caron
