= Wall to Wall =

Wall to Wall may refer to:

- Wall to Wall (production company), an independent television production company
- Wall to Wall (album), a 1981 album by René & Angela
- Wall to Wall (song), a 2007 song by Chris Brown
- Wall to Wall (film), a 2025 Netflix South Korean film
- "Wall to Wall" (Australian Playhouse), a 1962 episode of the Australian anthology drama series Australian Playhouse
- wall-to-wall, a term for fitted carpeting

== See also ==
- Wall (disambiguation)
