= Joan MacArthur =

British actress (1916–1975)

- Born: 30 April 1916; Lanarkshire, Scotland
- Died: 16 May 1975 (aged 59); Cambridgeshire, England
- Spouse: Raymond Westwell

Joan MacArthur (30 April 1916 – 16 May 1975) was a British actress who worked for many years in Australia. Known on stage as a Shakespearian actress, she also appeared in many television plays.

MacArthur toured New Zealand and Australia in 1953 with the Shakespeare Memorial Theatre Company.

She returned to Australia in the 1960s and appeared on stage and in television plays alongside her husband, Raymond Westwell.

MacArthur died in Cambridgeshire, England in 1975.

== Filmography ==
- The Angry General (1964)
- The First 400 Years (1964)
- Othello (1964)
- Romanoff and Juliet (1965)
- A Time to Speak (1965)
- Goodbye, Gloria, Hello! (1967)
