= The Man Who Saw It =

- Wednesday Theatre episode
- Episode no.: Season 2 Episode 44
- Directed by: John Croyston
- Teleplay by: Allan Trevor
- Original air date: 2 November 1966
- Running time: 60 mins

Episode chronology
← Previous "The House"	Next → "The Good Shoemaker and the Poor Fish Peddler"

"The Man Who Saw It" is a 1966 Australian TV play written by Allan Trevor and directed by John Croyston. It was an original for Australian television and aired as part of Wednesday Theatre on ABC on 2 November 1966 in Sydney.

== Plot ==
The new candidate for a political party sees a UFO. He is compelled to discuss it, even though this may see him lose his party's nomination.

== Cast ==
- Ron Haddrick
- Ben Gabriel as Whit Morgan
- Mark McManus as Larry Mitchell
- Don Crosby as Smithy
- John Gray

== Production ==
The play had been performed on radio in 1965.

== Reception ==
The Sydney Morning Herald TV critic said "An Australian play which reaches a competent level of writing, production and acting, is enough of a rarity to encourage a lenient salute to The Man Who Saw It," adding, "there were many well made small points in this well-filled hour about a fledgling political candidate who refuses to be putty in the hands of party schemers."
