= Continuity Man =

- Written by: Peter Nichols
- Directed by: Storry Walton
- Country of origin: Australia
- Original language: English

Production
- Production company: ABC

Original release
- Network: ABC
- Release: 4 March 1964 (Melbourne)

Continuity Man is a 1964 Australian TV play. It was based on a script by Peter Nichols about a continuity man. It was directed by Storry Walton.

It had been filmed for British TV in 1963 starring Roger Livesey.

== Plot ==
Don is the continuity man on a British TV show. His wife Roz is a dress designer.

== Cast ==
- John Gray as Walter, the father
- Judith Arthy as Roz Wheatley
- Alan Lander as Don Wheatley
- Joanne Duff as Manning Bennett

== Reception ==
The Sydney Morning Herald wrote the topic of the play "demands a quicker reconciliation than is entirely credible within the time span of a short television play" and felt that why John Gray "was as exasperatingly chirpy as the part demanded, and perhaps more so" the producer Storry Walton "did not succeed in drawing performances of matching conviction and assurance from his other players".

Val Marshall who wrote for the Sunday edition of the same paper called it "another piece of first class guff... a well-mounted well-dressed hour of rubbish" in which "none of the four person cast... seemed comfortable" but which still featured "one of the handsomest sets yet seen in a locally produced modern drama, a contemporary apartment authentic in detail right down to the Japanese wallpaper and the potted rubber tree."

The Age called it "one of the most viewable comedies to come our way from Sydney."
