= Stanley Walsh =

British-Australian producer, writer and actor

- Born: 1937; Halifax, Yorkshire, England
- Died: 17 September 2008 (aged 70–71); Sydney, New South Wales, Australia

Stanley Walsh (1937 – 17 September 2008) was a British-Australian producer, writer and actor best known for his work as producer on television. He started his career in the UK as an actor. He moved to Australia in 1964.

For a number of years he was an executive producer on Neighbours.

== Credits ==
- The Empty Day (1966) - actor
- Kings (1983) - producer
- Skin Deep (1984) - producer
- Butterfly Island (1985) - producer
- Body Business (1986) - producer
- The Golden Fiddles (1991) - producer
- The Other Side of Paradise (1992) -producer
- Neighbours (1994–2003) - executive producer
- Little Oberon (2005) - executive producer
