= The Pigeon (Australian Playhouse) =

- Australian Playhouse episode
- Episode no.: Season 1 Episode 1
- Directed by: Eric Taylor
- Teleplay by: Peter Finnane
- Original air date: 18 April 1966
- Running time: 30 mins

Episode chronology
← Previous —	Next → "The Tape Recorder"

"The Pigeon" is the first television play episode of the first season of the Australian anthology television series Australian Playhouse. "The Pigeon" was written by Peter Finnane and directed by Eric Taylor and originally aired on ABC on 18 April 1966.

David Goddard, who produced the series, called it "a very sensitive, very moving lovely piece."

Finnane reportedly wrote another play for the series, "The Widow Thrum", but it does not appear to have been filmed.

== Plot ==
Billy Sloane's school principal describes him as sloppy, shoddy, unpunctual, and uncooperative, but also infuriatingly truthful. Things aren't going too well for Billy, though. It's exam time at school and his mother is dying in hospital. His father has taken in a lady 'friend' to look after him and the police are looking for his brother Jack in connection with a string of armed robberies.

The only bright light in Billy's life is a sick pigeon he has found and is caring for. It's something he can write passionately about in his English exam. But then he's pulled out of class to be grilled about his brother by a detective. Billy's honesty is about to be put to the test.

== Cast ==
- Ross Thompson as Billy
- Moya O'Sullivan as Doris
- Don Philips as Barney Sloane
- Vaughan Tracey as the headmaster
- John Gregg as Fallon
- Kenneth Haigh as the police sergeant
- Lynne Murphy as Billy's mother

== Production ==
Peter Finnane was an English master at a Sydney High School.

== Reception ==
The Sydney Morning Herald encouraged audiences to take a hard line when watching Australian Playhouse and said "The Pigeon" "was certainly worth 30 minutes of your time."

The Canberra Times called it "excellent". Another critic called it "a tight half hour".

The Age said Finnane "might have made it something other than a shameless weepie if he had been more sparing with its ingredients." A later review in the same paper praised Thompson's acting but felt "some dialogue didn't ring true." Another writer in the same paper called it "promising".

The Bulletin said it had "a mixture of new talent, experienced players, and several very shaky ones."

The Sydney Morning Herald said "although it tried to pack a bit overmuch into 30 minutes it was a sensitively written study."
