= The First 400 Years =

- Ad in The Age 3 Oct 1964
- Written by: William Sterling
- Directed by: William Sterling
- Starring: Keith Michell; Googie Withers
- Country of origin: Australia
- Original language: English

Production
- Running time: Part 1 - 35 mins Part 2 - 35 mins
- Production company: ABC

Original release
- Release: 8 July 1964 (Part 1 - Melbourne)
- Release: 7 July 1964 (Part 2 - Sydney),
- Release: 7 October 1964 (Part 2 - Melbourne)

The First 400 Years is a 1964 Australian television play. It was filmed in Adelaide. The stars were performing in the play around Australia for J. C. Williamson's.

It screened in two parts.

== Premise ==
A collection of scenes from the plays of William Shakespeare.

Part One was more comic consisting of:

- the wooing scene from Taming of the Shrew
- Katherin's plea to the Royal Court in Henry VIII
- the scene with Lance and his dog from Two Gentlemen of Verona
- the church scene between Beatrice and Benedict in Much Ado About Nothing.

Part two was more serious consisting of:

- two scenes from The Merchant of Venice
- the balcony scene from Romeo and Juliet
- the closing scene from Hamlet.

== Cast ==
- Googie Withers
- Keith Michell
- Jeannette Serke
- Joan MacArthur
- Raymond Westwell
- Bruce Barry
- Alston Harvey
- Malcolm Phillips
- John Derum

== Original play ==
The show was based on a play directed by Raymond Westwell for J.C. Williamsons. It premiered in Melbourne on 23 April 1964, the 400th anniversal of Shakespeare's birth.

"What a profligate waste of costumes," wrote Column 8 in Sydney Morning Herald.

== Production ==
It was rehearsed and filmed in one day and the ABC's studios in Adelaide. Sterling said "Fortunately the stage production was almost ideal for TV. I tried to place the cameras in such a way that there was very little adjustment of movement and although the studio was smaller than the stage acting area, the production transposed well."

== Reception ==
The Sunday Sydney Morning Herald reviewer said it "lit up the screen... these couple of superb artists in action. My only complaint is that 30 minutes was not long enough."

One viewer called it "dull, flat and unprofitable."
