= Easy Terms =

- Australian Playhouse episode
- Episode no.: Season 1 Episode 28
- Teleplay by: Pat Flower
- Original air date: 24 October 1966
- Running time: 30 mins

Episode chronology
| ← Previous "Across the Bridge" | Next → "A Small Wonder" |

"Easy Terms" is the 28th television play episode of the first season of the Australian anthology television series Australian Playhouse. "Easy Terms" was written by Pat Flower and originally aired on ABC on 24 October 1966.

== Plot ==
For the smallest weekly payment, Miranda Vane can buy peace, truth and status, only to discover the hard sell stems from husband and salesman alike.

== Cast ==
- Gerda Nicholson as Miranda Vane
- Edward Hepple as the salesman
- Fred Parslow as Miranda's businessman husband

== Production ==
Flower originally wrote this and "The Lace Counter" for Robin Lovejoy's lunchtime theatre program. This program folded before Lovejoy even read them but once he did he recommended them to the ABC and Crowley became the main contributing writer to season one of Australian Playhouse. The play was shot in Melbourne with sets designed by Trevor Ling.

== Reception ==
The Sydney Morning Herald critic accused it and Marleen of having "hollow nothingness."

The Sydney Morning Herald said "This was Miss Flower's sixth or seventh in the series — even the faithful have lost count — and it only increased the wonder at how her scripts are accepted so frequently. Set in an "op" art flat crammed with sterile bad taste, the characters were creatures who could not exist. They endlessly gave smart chatter such as: "Kiddies are only an afterthought" . . "My husband may pop off with a popsie" . . . "We can make our own earth here in Heaven." A sermon on the folly of selling one's soul for trashy possessions may have lurked there — may have, but who wants a sermon in a playhouse?"

The Canberra Times said "there cannot be very many viewers left these days for the Australian Playhouse series on ABC, which has rapidly become The Pat Flower Show... "Easy Terms" makes a grand total for the authoress of nine out of twenty-eight, which is over thirty-two per cent. No one, I am sure, would be even inclined to comment and everyone would wish her luck if they were becoming more and more entertaining, but a play like "Easy Terms", a creaking study of possession-culture "fantasised", was surely more suitable fora select audience in experimental Jane St. Theatre, Kensington, than for general entertainment."

The Age called it a "plotless, formless hunk of tripe" in which "the actors went on just mouthing words."

== See also ==
- List of television plays broadcast on Australian Broadcasting Corporation (1960s)
