= Allan Trevor =

Australian actor, writer and producer

Allan Trevor (1923 - 1969) was an Australian actor, writer and producer.

== Early life ==
He worked on the land for nearly six years but changed careers when he realised he would not earn enough money to buy his own farm. He undertook various other jobs, including police cadet, shop assistant and salesman, before he began to study acting in Perth in 1941.

== Career ==
Trevor moved to Sydney in 1947 and became one of the leading radio actors in the city, appearing in more than 500 radio plays and serials. He won the Macquarie Acting Award for Best Actor.

He finally concentrated on writing for television and became the line producer for the majority of Crawford's popular 1967 spy series Hunter, in which he also appeared occasionally as an actor.

He also launched the long-running police series Division 4.

== Death ==
Trevor died suddenly in Melbourne at the end of 1969, after the launch of Division 4. At the time of his death, he was married to the award-winning television producer, Marie Trevor (born Brisbane, Queensland, 1922 - 7 June 2000), who stepped into his producing duties on Division 4 at the encouragement of Hector Crawford.

== Acting credits ==
=== Television ===
- The Adventures of Long John Silver (1955)
- Armchair Theatre (1960)
- The Patriots (1962) as Governor Ralph Darling
- Tribunal (1963)
- Australian Playhouse - "Across the Bridge"
- Homicide (1966–67)
- Hunter (1967–69)
- Division 4 (1969–70)

=== Film ===
- Getting Along with the Government (1966, TV film)
- Three in One (1957, anthology film) as Preacher
- Topaze (1966, TV film) as Castel-Benac

=== Stage ===
- The Break (1962) at Union Theatre, Sydney with Australian Elizabethan Theatre Trust

=== Radio Plays ===
- The Explorers (1952) - Wills
- Black Lightning (1952) - Max Leader

== Writer / Producer credits ==
- The Angry General (1965) - writer
- The Man Who Saw It (1966) - writer
- Slow Poison (1967) - writer
- Contrabandits (1967) - writer
- Hunter (1967–69) - producer
- Division 4 (1969–70) -producer
