= The Brass Guitar =

- Australian Playhouse episode
- Episode no.: Season 2 Episode 7
- Teleplay by: Oriel Gray
- Original air date: 31 July 1967
- Running time: 30 mins

Episode chronology
← Previous "Enough to Make a Pair of Sailor's Trousers"	Next → "John Forrester Awaits the Light"

"The Brass Guitar" is the seventh television play episode of the second season of the Australian anthology television series Australian Playhouse. "The Brass Guitar" was written by Oriel Gray and originally aired on ABC on 31 July 1967 in Melbourne and on 4 September 1967 in Sydney,

== Plot ==
Toby Campbell, a pop idol, loves both wife and brass guitar, but the idol of success demands that one be sacrificed.

== Cast ==
- Martin McGee
- Terry McDermott
- Lyndell Rowe

== Reception ==
The Bulletin called it "a fussy, fancy, rather desperate essay into quirky humor which failed mainly because it needed sharp dialogue but had nothing more original than, "This boy has nightmares that could win Melbourne Cups." In its favor: Alan Clarke's op art set, and Terry McDermott's appearance as a raincoated, very Orstralian detective."

== See also ==
- List of television plays broadcast on Australian Broadcasting Corporation (1960s)
