= Anonymous (Australian Playhouse) =

- Australian Playhouse episode
- Episode no.: Season 1 Episode 11
- Teleplay by: Pat Flower
- Original air date: 27 June 1966
- Running time: 30 mins

Episode chronology
← Previous "The Monkey Cage"	Next → "The Parking Ticket"

"Anonymous" is the 11th television play episode of the first season of the Australian anthology television series Australian Playhouse. "Anonymous" was written by Pat Flower and originally aired on ABC on 27 June 1966.

== Plot ==
In a moment of tragic irony, a harassed and henpecked businessman, Walter, faces death alone when he has a heart attack.

== Cast ==
- Peter O'Shaughnessy as Walter
- Shirley O'Shaughnessy
- Elspeth Ballantyne
- Gerard Kennedy
- Helen Harper

== Reception ==
The Sydney Morning Herald critic said that "Despite the occasional relevance of Miss Flower's observations, ironic or start... my natural inclination would have been to switch off as soon as I discovered that the play was in fact saying nothing remarkable, while seemingly seeking by every means to produce alarming discomfort for its own sake. Echo chambers, stills, superimposed wavering images, muffled heart throbs, crooked angled shots, the satanic voice of the narrator, were all piled on thickly enough to produce a severe malaise in the viewer, heavily underlining Peter O'Shaugnessy's virtuoso job with protracted death agonies. Again like so many of the snippets of Playhouse, a worthwhile subject for sensitive treatment went astray with verbose dialogue and over stated production."

The Age critic said "it was probably the worst play I have ever seen. It is thin, wretched and witless. Artistically, dramatically and aesthetically it had nothing to commend it. More than all else, it was just unspeakably revolting."

The Sunday The Sydney Morning Herald called it "chilling" where "Flower consolidated her position as the TV playwright of the year... [a] winner... O'Shaugnessy pulls out all stops."

== See also ==
- List of television plays broadcast on Australian Broadcasting Corporation (1960s)
