= Marleen (Australian Playhouse) =

- Australian Playhouse episode
- Episode no.: Season 1 Episode 14
- Directed by: David Goddard
- Teleplay by: Pat Flower
- Original air date: July 18, 1966
- Running time: 30 mins

Episode chronology
← Previous "Should the Woman Pay"	Next → "The Final Factor"

"Marleen" is the 14th television play episode of the first season of the Australian anthology television series Australian Playhouse. "Marleen" was written by Pat Flower and originally aired on ABC on July 18, 1966.

== Plot ==
Three marching girls are waiting for the results of a competition to elect the World Miss Marching Girl. One of them has a more sinister goal. Her parents end up shooting a girl.

== Cast ==
- Joy Mitchell
- Fay Kelton
- Sydney Conabere
- Liz Harris
- Dorothy Bradley

== Reception ==
The play was poorly reviewed.

One critic argued "it is time... Australian Playhouse had an independent audit. The works we are seeing ore not worth more than two cents of the licence fee. Pat Flower's "Marleen"... was a macabre grin at nothing. Those who saw it must have wondered if they themselves were short on brains, so short was it on plausible entertainment. Those who didn't see it need not die worrying. But Miss Flower cannot be blamed for the series. Efforts which should never have gone to air have included a puerile analogy between a parking ticket and an early baby ... a prissy story about a dotty couple tricking each other over a dead man . . . not to mention the short, short bit of witlessness in which a husband and a lover were ever so conveniently trapped in a lift. The series has had few moments one cares to remember. It would be unfair to blame David Goddard, the overall director, or any of his studio teams. They are involved in production and cannot be expected to stand off with objective judgments. What is required is an independent judge to evaluate scripts, check again at rehearsals and stop dead every play that doesn't look like rising above workshop level. Otherwise, Australian Playhouse will do more harm than good to the cause of home-grown TV."

The Age said "the ABC had never presented anything sillier."

The Bulletin said Pat Flower "is beginning to get the half hour length. The use of film behind, and the senseless, but eerie, marching of the girls up and down the Marching- Girls’ hall, were an advance in more ways than one. But I do wish that someone would write a simple comedy or two for the series."

== See also ==
- List of television plays broadcast on Australian Broadcasting Corporation (1960s)
