= The Angry General =

- Written by: Allan Trevor
- Directed by: Patrick Barton
- Country of origin: Australia
- Original language: English

Production
- Running time: 60 mins
- Production company: ABC

Original release
- Network: ABC
- Release: 11 March 1964 (Melbourne)
- Release: 15 April 1964 (Sydney)
- Release: 15 July 1964 (Brisbane)

The Angry General is a 1964 Australian television play written by Australian author Allan Trevor.

== Premise ==
The play is set in London in the present day. Former wartime minister, Lord Athol Medway, publishes his memoirs attacking the leadership of Major-General Forbes Barrington-Hunt in the war during a disastrous commando raid. Barrington-Hunt sets out to clear his name.

== Cast ==
- Raymond Westwell as Major-General Forbes Barrington-Hunt
- Edward Howell as Lord Athol Medway
- Williams Lloyd as Sir Geoffrey Bryson
- Norman Kaye as Major Derek Barrington-Hunt
- Joan Letch as Jane Barrington-Hunt
- Dorothy Bradley as Elizabeth Barrington-Hunt
- Joan MacArthur as Miriam Barrington-Hunt
- Campbell Copelin as Gen George Chaesling
- Douglas Kelly as Dobson
- Kenrick Hudson as Dickie
- Raymond O'Reilly as Hodge
- Neville Thurgood as Benbow
- Christine Calcutt as sister

== Production ==
It was one of 20 TV plays produced by the ABC in 1964 (and one of only three Australian scripts). It was the first one that year to originate in Melbourne.

It was a play by Australian actor and author Allan Trevor and was produced in Melbourne. Trevor called the play "a study in motives — the motives that make people accept what is not right to achieve their own ends." He said the plot was "based very loosely on the case history of one of the numerous generals 'bowlerhatted' for no apparent reason during World War II." Trevor added that "It has as a leading character a 62 year old man still vital enough to dominate a television play. Dramatic events do not all happen to the young, clean cut chaps with wavy hair who turn up so often."

It was the Australian TV debut of Raymond Westwell. He had only acted once before in Australia, in a stage production of Ross, but worked as a director of theatre, notably Camelot. He said he accepted the role "because he was getting a bit rusty as far as acting was concerned. This will help keep me fresh and flexible." His wife Joan MacArthur had a role playing the wife of Westwell's character.

== Reception ==
The TV critic for The Sydney Morning Herald thought that despite "a liberal sprinkling of cliches and a pattern of stilted patches in its dialogue" the play "maintained a high degree of tension... Two major merits distinguished it. One was the originality of its theme, and the other a consistently capable standard of acting."
