= The Valley of Water =

- Written by: Jean Allen
- Directed by: Rex Heading
- Starring: Jack Taggart
- Country of origin: Australia
- Original language: English

Production
- Producer: Rex Heading
- Running time: 60 mins
- Production company: NWS-9

Original release
- Release: 25 March 1962 (Adelaide)
- Release: 2 November 1962 (Sydney)

The Valley of Water is a 1962 Australian television drama that was made by Nine Network in Adelaide. It was the first one-hour television drama to be shot in South Australia.

The ABC later made Weather at Pinetop (1964) in Adelaide.

== Plot ==
A family live on a farm which is threatened by flood from a new dam.

== Cast ==
- Hedley Cullen
- Barrie McEwin
- Myra Noblet
- Jack Taggart
- Patrick Taggart

== Production ==
It was based on an original play by Jean Allen, a housewife who lived in the town of Wolseley. At the Adelaide Festival of the Arts in March 1962, the play came second in a Television Play Competition sponsored by Channel Nine. There had been 45 entries and they judges included Harry Death, executive producer of the TV series Jonah; local author Max Harris; Rex Heading, who would produce and direct the winner for Channel Nine; and Nine's general manager, Bill Davies. First prize went to Wall to Wall by Anne Kinloch, which was never produced; Heading later wrote that Wall to Wall "was a very different type of play which would have tested the technical facilities and ingenuity of the station." So Nine decided to produce Valley of Water.

The production was filmed at NWS 9, Tynte Street, North Adelaide. Rehearsals began on 12 February. The production was recorded in a full day session on 10 March 1962. The cast consisted of local actors including father and son team Jack and Patrick Taggart. Dean Semler was the floor manager.

== Reception ==
The production was broadcast in Sydney on 2 November 1962 at 10.30 p.m. The Sydney Morning Herald TV critic wrote "the most striking thing about its writing and production was how little they seemed to belong to visual medium" pointing out the production "missed the chance of letting viewers see and appreciate the open-air attractions of the" farm for themselves. The critic felt the script was obviously written for the stage "to judge from the abnormally high number of obvious curtain lines retained in the dialogue. For three parts of its length the play seemed a composite of the Blue Hills type of radio serial and a "human" documentary, with that accomplished actor Hedley Cullen having to submit twice to the indignity of having his most anguished silences interrupted by the recorded mooing of a cow. The play might easily have ended at the close of "Act Three" (so labelled), but the playwright decided at that point to focus her attention on Patrick Taggart's obstinate grandfather and encourage the play to become a study in obsession. The effect was melodramatic, but also a refreshing indication that the author had grown tired of the tidy banality of her semi-documentary beginning. It seemed to promise that she might be on the way to turning herself into a dramatist."

== See also ==
- Joanna Of Arc (1961)
- Trial Or Trust (1963)
- Born On This Tide (1963)
- The Weather At Pine Top (1964)
- The First 400 Years (1964)
- Dark Corridor (1965)
- King Lear (1967)
