= Weather at Pinetop =

1964 television film

Weather at Pinetop is a 1964 Australian television short which aired on ABC. Produced in Adelaide it aired in Melbourne on 20 May 1964. It was written by Colin Free and was a half-hour drama, directed by Anthony Roberts. Two sets were used: a café interior and a cottage verandah.

Channel Nine had made The Valley of Water in Adelaide.

== Plot ==
Birdie, the wife of a country roadside café owner, wants to leave the cafe and start a new life with Cal.

== Cast ==
- Carmel Millhouse (Birdie)
- Les Dayman (Cal)
- Rod Douglas (Ollie)
- Myra Noblett (Gran)
- Pamela Western (Noelle)
