= The Other Side of Paradise (TV series) =

- Based on: The Other Side of Paradise by Noel Barber
- Screenplay by: Denise Morgan
- Directed by: Renny Rye
- Starring: Jason Connery; Josephine Byrnes; Richard Wilson; Vivien Tan
- Composer: Martin Armiger
- Countries of origin: United Kingdom; Australia; New Zealand
- Original language: English
- No. of episodes: 4

Production
- Executive producers: Ian Bradley; Ted Childs; Don Reynolds
- Producer: Stanley Walsh
- Production locations: Rarotonga, Cook Islands
- Cinematography: Ellery Ryan
- Editor: Tim Wellburn
- Running time: 60 minutes
- Production companies: Central Independent Television; Grundy Television; South Pacific Pictures

Original release
- Network: ITV; Network Ten
- Release: 22 February – 14 March 1992

The Other Side of Paradise is a 1992 miniseries based on the book by British novelist and journalist Noel Barber, about a doctor who goes to the Cook Islands.

When pioneering doctor Kit Masters is forced to flee England, he makes a new start on the South Sea island of Koraloona. Enchanted by the island and its people, Kit falls in love with the daughter of the island princess, and dreams of building a hospital. But all is under threat as war approaches.

== Production companies ==
- Central Television
- Grundy Television
- Grundy Film Financing

== Crew ==
- Executive producers:
  - Ian Bradley
  - Ted Childs
  - Don Reynolds
- Producer: Stanley Walsh
- Director: Renny Rye
- Series writing credits:
  - Noel Barber (novel)
  - Denise Morgan (writer)

== Cast ==
- Jason Connery as Chris Masters
- Josephine Byrnes as Paula Reid
- Richard Wilson as Doc Reid
- Vivien Tan as Aleena
- Hywel Bennett as Purvis
- Jay Laga'aia as Mana
- Terence Bayler as Colonel Fawcett
- Judy Morris as Miss Sowerby
- Garry McDonald as Johnson

== Music ==
- Martin Armiger (composer)
- Derek Williams (composer: additional music / conductor / orchestrator)
- Edward Primrose (composer: additional music / conductor / orchestrator)
