= The Lace Counter =

- Australian Playhouse episode
- Episode no.: Season 1 Episode 24
- Teleplay by: Pat Flower
- Original air date: 26 September 1966
- Running time: 30 mins

Episode chronology
← Previous "The Decision"	Next → "Objector"

"The Lace Counter" is the 24th television play episode of the first season of the Australian anthology television series Australian Playhouse. "The Lace Counter" was written by Pat Flower and originally aired on ABC on 26 September 1966.

== Plot ==
Miss Peach and Mrs Plum, meet across the Lace counter in a department store and discover that both sides of the counter yield elusive truths.

== Cast ==
- Ruth Cracknell as Miss Peach
- Aileen Britton as Mrs Plum
- Noel Brophy as Mr Prune

== Production ==
Flower originally wrote this and Easy Terms for Robin Lovejoy's lunchtime theatre program. This program folded before Lovejoy even read them but once he did he recommended them to the ABC and Crowley became the main contributing writer to season one of Australian Playhouse. It was shot in Sydney.

== Reception ==
The Age gave it a poor review.
