= No Dogs on Diamond Street =

- Australian Playhouse episode
- Episode no.: Season 1 Episode 5
- Directed by: Storry Walton
- Teleplay by: Marion Ord
- Original air date: 16 May 1966
- Running time: 30 mins

Guest appearance
- Ed Devereaux

Episode chronology
← Previous "The Prowler"	Next → "Wall to Wall"

"No Dogs on Diamond Street" is the fifth television play episode of the first season of the Australian anthology television series Australian Playhouse. "No Dogs on Diamond Street" was written by Marion Ord and directed by Storry Walton and originally aired on ABC on 16 May 1966

== Plot ==
A watchman is murdered at Norm Hutton's place of work. He relies on his daughter Patti to provide an alibi.

== Cast ==
- Ed Devereaux as Norm Hutton
- Helen Morse as Patty Hutton
- Margaret Christensen
- Beverley Kirk
- Don Reid

== Production ==
It was written by Marion Ord, who lived in a property near Parkes. In 1965 she attended at TV school at Orange held by the University of Sydney Adult Education Department, and started writing Do Dogs as an exercise for the course.

It was made by the same team who had produced a TV version of My Brother Jack including star Ed Devereaux, designer Jack Montgomery and producer Storry Walton.

== Reception ==
The Sunday The Sydney Morning Herald called it "flimsy and amateurishly constructed at times but balanced by exceptionally fine acting performances from Ed (My Brother Jack) Devereux, Margaret Christensen and Helen Morse. "

The Sydney Morning Herald praised Helen Morse and said "the other actors were all full capable of making the characters live, but the ragged effect of both dialogue and events in the story were against them."

The Age said it "showed a more than expert craftsmaship than was to be found in the last two episodes of the series. The acting was good and the setting was adequate."

The Canberra Times said "why is it that Australian playwrights seem to connect drama with crime, and that plays about suburbia are made to work with a stiff lacing of larceny, murder or prowlers? Now that these themes have been more than sufficiently covered in four of the five Monday night plays, we must keep our fingers crossed that a reasonable part of the remainder; will deal with problems and complications that the rest of the population are facing from day to day... The play... will do nothing for the reputations of Ed Devereaux or the others in the cast."

== See also ==
- List of television plays broadcast on Australian Broadcasting Corporation (1960s)
