= Romanoff and Juliet (Wednesday Theatre) =

- Wednesday Theatre episode
- Episode no.: Season 1 Episode 3
- Directed by: Patrick Barton
- Teleplay by: Noel Robinson
- Based on: Romanoff and Juliet by Peter Ustinov
- Original air date: 20 January 1965
- Running time: 90 mins

Episode chronology
← Previous "Peter Grimes"	Next → "The Bomb"

"Romanoff and Juliet" is a 1964 Australian television play based on the play by Peter Ustinov. It aired on 20 January 1965 in Sydney, and on 27 January 1965 in Melbourne.

It was part of Wednesday Theatre.

== Plot ==
In a small European country, Judith, the daughter of the American ambassador, falls for the Igor, son of the Russia ambassador.

== Cast ==
- Raymond Westwell as the general
- Judith Arthy as Juliet
- Laurence Beck as Igor
- Eric Reiman as Moulsworth
- Wynn Roberts as Vadim Romanoff
- Joan MacArthur as Beulah
- Marion Edward as Evdokia
- Terry Norris as the spy Mauve Monk
- Fay Kelton as Martha
- Bruce Barry as American boy
- Dennis Miller as Soldier
- Clive Winmill as Soldier
- Sheila Florence as Archbishop

== Production ==
It was filmed in Melbourne.

== Reception ==
The TV critic for the Sydney Morning Herald thought the production was similar to "a children's pantomime... however, a lot of it is lively and amusing enough to raise a smile."
