= From the Tropics to the Snow =

- Directed by: Jack Lee; Richard Mason
- Written by: John Morris; Cedric Flower; Pat Flower
- Produced by: Jack S. Allan executive producer: Stanley Hawes
- Edited by: Christopher Cordeaux; Don Saunders
- Production company: Commonwealth Film Unit
- Release date: 1964
- Running time: 28 minutes
- Country: Australia
- Language: English

From the Tropics to the Snow is a 1964 Australian short documentary film. It was one of the best known Australian films of the 1960s. It was produced under the auspices of the Commonwealth Film Unit (CFU), later reincorporated as Film Australia. It was co-directed by Jack Lee and Richard (Dick) Mason, and featured Reg Livermore (in his first film role) as one of the 'narrators'.

One of the regular duties of the CFU at this time was the production of short films that were purpose-made for overseas distribution and were intended to promote Australia as an attractive destination for migrants and tourists. From the Tropics to the Snow marked a significant break with the traditional style of such features, and is noted for its subversive and satirical approach to its subject.

Rather than using the stilted, authoritative single-voice narration that was typical of such 'promotion documentaries' at the time, Mason and Lee opted for a strikingly reflexive approach, using a lively (and frequently tongue-in-cheek) multi-voice narration, which is introduced through the dramatic device of a production planning meeting between the film's Producer-in-Chief (Alexander Archdale), the director (Alastair Smart) and the screenwriter (Livermore). This allowed the film to become an ironic critique of itself, humorously examining the mechanics of "documentary" film construction, and the competing pressures and choices that faced filmmakers when creating such films. It also gently parodied Lee and Mason's own situation as "young turks" charged with turning out what were in essence "production-line" propaganda films for a hidebound government department.

The film won one of the two Gold Medals given out at the 1965 Australian Film Institute Awards while winning the Travel Award. It also won the Australian National Travel Association's Award for Travel Films Jedda Award, the Kodak Award for Best Colour Photography medallion and the Australian Cinematographers' Society Awards plaque at the ceremony.

Colin Bennett from The Age wrote "After years and years of making cliche-ridden P.R. films about Australia, the Commonwealth Film Unit and the National Film Board have finally plucked up courage to "take the mickey" out of cliche-ridden P.R. films about Australia." He goes on to say "This short film, then, is not only enjoyable. It is a courageous effort to come from an official unit in the sphere of hidebound Australian film production." The Sydney Morning Herald says "it is a crisp departure from the norm, and a clever way of overcoming the diffulculty of fitting "everything about Australia" (we-ell, nearly everything!) into its brief compass of 28 minutes." When it aired on SBS in 1999, Robin Oliver in The Sydney Morning Herald wrote "The set-up is diabolically corny, a jokey film about a film being made about Australia, a point laboured in the opening credits."
