= Storry Walton =

Storry Walton AM is an Australian academic, writer, producer and director. He produced and directed many television plays and serials, including My Brother Jack. He has directed ABC documentaries on art and on rural matters. While based in London, made programs for the BBC-TV social documentary series, Man Alive.

He was an early director of the Australian Film and Television School and had a long relationship with the National Institute of Dramatic Art.

In 1984 Walton was made a Member of the Order of Australia for "service to the Australian film industry, particularly as director of the Australian Film and Television School".

== Select credits ==
- The Life and Death of King Richard II (1960) (TV movie) – associate producer
- Continuity Man (1964) (TV series) – producer
- The Stranger (1965) (TV series) – producer
- My Brother Jack (1965) (TV series) – producer
- The Monkey Cage (1966) (TV play)
- No Dogs on Diamond Street (1966)
- The Runaway (1966)
- Love and War – episode "Construction" (1967) – producer
- Casualty (1967) – producer
- One Hundred a Day (1973) (short) – producer
- The First Fagin (2012) (documentary) – associate producer
