= Alistair Smart =

British art historian

Peter Alistair Marshall Smart (30 April 1922–21 December 1992) was a 20th-century British historian and expert on Allan Ramsay.

== Life ==
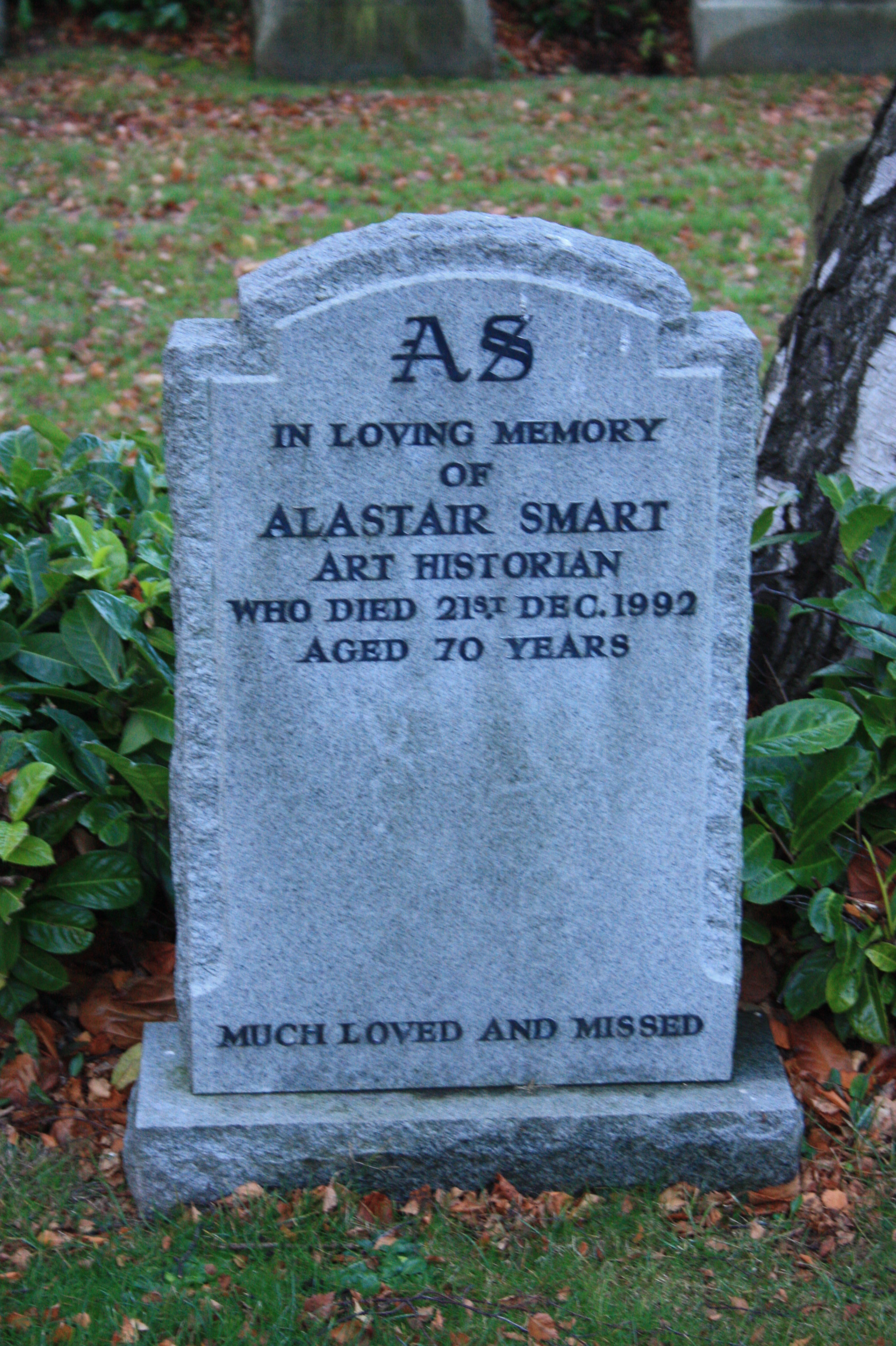
The grave of Alistair Smart, Dean Cemetery, Edinburgh

He was born in Cambridge on 30 April 1922 the son of Prof John Couch Adams, grandson of his namesake astronomer grandfather, John Couch Adams.

His university career was long and varied. He first studied English at Glasgow University. His studies were interrupted by the Second World War during which he was wounded, and after the war he "found religion" and studied to be a minister at New College, Edinburgh. He then changed direction again and spent three years at Edinburgh College of Art under Sir William George Gillies. He then undertook postgraduate studies at the University of British Columbia and the Institute of Fine Arts in New York. His first post was as a lecturer in Art History at University College, Hull.

He was Head of the Fine Art Department at the University of Nottingham from 1956 to 1982, being granted his professorship in 1963.

He died in Edinburgh on 21 December 1992. He is buried in the 20th century extension to Dean Cemetery in the west of the city.

== Family ==
He was married to Marita Lawlor-Johnson. They had one son and one daughter.

== Publications ==
- The Life and Art of Allan Ramsay (1952)
- Paintings and Drawings by Allan Ramsay (1964)
- The Assisi Problem and the Art of Giotto (1971) reprinted 1983
- The Renaissance and Mannerism in Northern Europe and Spain (1972)
- Constable and his Country (1976) co-written with Col Attfield Brooks
- The Dawn of Italian Painting (1978)
