= Pat Flower =

Australian writer

- Born: Patricia Mary Byson Flower; 23 February 1914; Ramsgate, Kent, England, United Kingdom
- Died: 2 September 1977 (aged 63); New South Wales, Australia
- Occupations: Playwright, screenwriter, novelist
- Spouse: Cedric Arthur Flower

Patricia Mary Byson Flower (23 February 1914 – 2 September 1977) was an English Australian writer of plays, television plays and novels.

== Biography ==
She was born in Ramsgate, Kent, England and moved to Australia with her family in 1928. She originally worked as a secretary, writing radio plays and sketches in her spare time. She eventually moved on to writing crime novels and TV scripts.

She wrote so many episodes of the ABC TV series Australian Playhouse one critic called it "The Pat Flower Show". Her scripts were typically either thrillers or comedies.

She was married to Cedric Flower (1920-2000), an actor, costume designer, designer, playwright, director, playwright, producer and set designer.

She had one son with Bruce Jiffkins in 1939.

Flower committed suicide in New South Wales, Australia in September 1977.

== Select writings ==
- Port of Message (1949) – revue at New Theatre – contributing writer
- Love Returns to Umbrizi (1958) – radio play – writer
- From the Tropics to the Snow (1961) – film script
- The Prowler (1966) – television play
- You've Never Had It So Good (1965–66) – revue at New Theatre – contributing writer
- Fiends of the Family (1966) – novel – adapted for TV in 1968
- The Tape Recorder (1966) – television play
- Marleen (1966) – television play
- Done Away with It (1966) – television play
- Anonymous (1966) – television play
- The Lace Counter (1966) – television play
- The V.I.P.P. (1966) – television play
- Easy Terms (1966) – television play
- The Empty Day (1966) – television play
- The Heat's On (1967) – television play
- Tilley Landed On Our Shores (1967) – television play – won Dame Mary Gilmore Award
- Exposure 70 (1970) – revue at New Theatre – contributing writer
- Dynasty (1971) – episodes of series inc "Who Wants A Bridge"
- Catwalk (1972) – episodes of series
- The Tape Recorder (1972) – play adaptation of television play
- Number 96 (1972) – episode of series
- What's New (1973) – revue at New Theatre – contributing writer
- The Alchemist (1982) – adaptation of Ben Johnson play – performed at New Theatre

=== Inspector Swinton series of crime novels ===
- Wax Flowers for Gloria (1958)
- Goodbye Sweet William (1959)
- A Wreath of Water-Lilies (1960)
- One Rose Less (1961)
- Hell for Heather (1962)
- Term of Terror (1963)
- Fiends of the Family (1966)
- Hunt the Body (1968)
- Cobweb (1972)
- Cat's Cradle (1973)
- Odd Job (1974)
- Slyboots (1974)
- Vanishing Point (1975)
- Crisscross (1976)
- Shadow Show (1976)
