= Judith Arthy =

Australian actress (born 1940)

Judith Anne Arthy (born c. 1943) is an Australian former actress and writer. She featured in theatre TV and film roles and also worked in England, where her novels were dramatised by the BBC.

== Career ==
Judith Arthy began her theatrical career in a production of Arthur Miller's The Crucible with the Brisbane Repertory Theatre in July 1957. From 1961 appearances in Sydney - initially in Alan Seymour's The One Day of the Year - and later in Melbourne, a successful run of The Fantasticks an appeared in The Merchant of Venice.

Arthy made her cinematic debut in 1966 in They're a Weird Mob began an extended stay in the UK in 1966, inaugurating a series of British television credits with a guest spot on The Baron. Subsequent credits included Randall and Hopkirk (Deceased); episode 1 of the Lord Peter Wimsey, (Clouds of Witness); Masterpiece Theatre; and Z-Cars.

Arthy made her London West End stage debut in 1969 with William Douglas Home's The Secretary Bird playing opposite Kenneth More at the Savoy Theatre, and later a further West End appearance with Eartha Kitt in Norman Krasna's Broadway comedy Bunny at the Criterion Theatre. Meanwhile, Arthy had participated in the 1970 season at the Chichester Festival Theatre appearing in Arms and the Man and Peer Gynt. Also for her were featuring roles in the films The Shuttered Room (1967) and Arthur? Arthur! (1969).

In 1975 Arthy resumed her stage and television career in Australia: her final apparent screen credit was the Australian television series Case For the Defence which ran in May and June 1978. Arthy subsequently taught secondary-school English and drama in Brisbane.

Her two novels are Goodbye Goldilocks (1984) and - for younger readers - The Children of Mirrabooka (1997).

Brisbane audiences saw her return to the stage in 2002 to La Boite Theatre in Peta Murray's

== Personal life ==
Arthy was born in c.1943 in Brisbane, Queensland, Australia. She married the Australian croquet champion and film-maker Aggy Read and was with him at the time of his death on 22 August 1998.

Arthy gave birth to one son, Luke Arthy-Beardon. He is the father of Alexander Luke Arthy-Beardon. Luke is an independent musician who plays multiple instruments.
