= Australian Playhouse =

- Genre: Anthology
- Created by: David Goddard
- Country of origin: Australia
- Original language: English
- No. of seasons: 2
- No. of episodes: 40

Production
- Producer: David Goddard
- Running time: 30 mins

Original release
- Network: ABC
- Release: April 1966 – 1967

Australian Playhouse was an Australian anthology TV series featuring the work of Australian writers.

It ran for two series consisting of 40 episodes. Among the featured productions were works by Pat Flower who was the main writer having written 10 episodes,

other writers on the series included Michael Boddy, James Davern, Richard Lane, Tony Morphett, John Warwick, Barbara Vernon and David Sale

== Background ==
=== Development ===
In August 1965 Talbot Duckmanton of the ABC announced that the ABC would increase its production of local drama, including a show called Australian Playhouse. This would not necessary consist of Australian plays and be "of an experimental nature".

The series was the idea of producer David Goddard, father of actress Liza. Goddard worked on the show for nine months before it aired. He says he knew of a TV station which claimed it was going to so a TV series and asked for scripts, then claimed the scripts were not of standard; Goddard says the station never put on staff, and actually had no intention of making the show. "It was making a political gesture by saying it was trying to do something. It is absolutely scandalous that this sort of thing should have been going on here. And this is where the idea has been built up that there are no writers in Australia. As we shall prove, this is absolute rubbish."

Goddard said "There's a wealth of untouched and untapped gold in the Australian short story writer. The Australian is gifted with the ability to tell a story."

He said the show "will all be written by Australians and produced in Australia. And because they are written by Australians and aimed at television audiences primarily in Australia, they will reflect, comment on, or observe in a fictional way life in this country, as those writers see fit, know it, or have experienced it. In a word, it will be Australian drama."

=== Season One ===
In January 1966 Goddard announced that the ABC would make 39 episodes of 30 minutes each called Australian Playhouse. They would do 14 weeks "in all moods", then 12 "equally Australian dramas on a central theme", then 13 more. This would be in addition to the ABC's monthly dramas, and a comedy series. (The comedy series would be Nice and Jucy and Marcellus Jones.

Series one ran from April 1966 to early November 1966.

In April 1966, Neil Hutchinson said, "Most of us have heard or read claims that Australia lacks good writers but I think you will agree this series disproves the claims."

According to Frank Roberts of The Bulletin, writing in May, the series "has to be viewed as a promising nursery".

It is estimated eight to nine productions were written and filmed but not broadcast due to concerns about quality.

In June 1966 The Sydney Morning Herald wrote the series demonstrated that there was a lack of creative talent in the country, particularly of writing.

At the end of 1966 the Age TV critic felt the majority of plays did not deserve to appear on air. Val Marshall of The Sydney Morning Herald, reviewing the season for the year, said "what came up didn't always justify the timeslot. Roughly 10 percent were excellent (with the biggest score of winners going to Pat Flower). Another 40 percent was fair average quality. The other half can be written off as good tries. Was the Playhouse series justified? In my view yes."

It won a 1967 Logie Award for Contribution to the Industry.

Goddard said, "We have plenty of scripts and the future of Playhouse appears good. If there were to be any changes for next year it would only be a change in the time spot - perhaps later in the evening. We have some brilliant plays but they are only suitable for adult viewing."

In December 1966 the ABC reported it spent a million dollars on Australian drama since 1956. It said it produced 358 plays, 187 of which were written by Australians. Australian Playhouse cost a reported $55,000 for 37 plays.

The season was later described as 50% drama, 25% comedy, 25% fantasy.

=== Season 2 ===
The budget tripled for the second series. However it ran for a shorter time.

The series started on 12 June 1967 in Melbourne and then broadcast in Queensland, South Australia, Tasmania, Western Australia and then New South Wales on 24 July. By June all the episodes had been filmed and work had started on the 1968 season. Pat Alexander, executive producer, said over 1,000 scripts had been submitted. "The result has been much better material," said Alexander.

Only two scripts were by writers from the previous season. Fifty percent of the plays were comedies, forty percent drama, and ten percent fantasy of experimental. (Another breakdown had it as 40% drama, 33% comedy, 27% comedy fantasy.)

The Sydney Morning Herald called it "an inconsistent thing but our own".

A Sunday issue of the same paper called the second series "the biggest flop" of the year.

== Episodes ==
=== Season 1 ===
| No. overall | No. in season | Title | Directed by | Written by | Original release date |
|---|---|---|---|---|---|
| 1 | 1 | "The Pigeon" | Eric Taylor | Peter Finnane | 18 April 1966 |
| 2 | 2 | "The Tape Recorder" | Henri Safran | Pat Flower | 25 April 1966 |
| 3 | 3 | "The Air-Conditioned Author" | Henri Safran | Colin Free | 2 May 1966 |
| 4 | 4 | "The Prowler" | Alan Burke | Pat Flower | 9 May 1966 |
| 5 | 5 | "No Dogs on Diamond Street" | Storry Walton | Marion Ord | 16 May 1966 |
| 6 | 6 | "Wall to Wall" | Eric Taylor | Anne Kinloch | 23 May 1966 |
| 7 | 7 | "Getting Along with the Government" | John Croyston | Colin Free | 30 May 1966 |
| 8 | 8 | "What About Next Year" | Patrick Barton | Richard Lane | 6 June 1966 |
| 9 | 9 | "Antarctic Four" | Alan Burke | Oriel Gray | 13 June 1966 |
| 10 | 10 | "The Monkey Cage" | Wilf Buckler | Ruth Fenner | 20 June 1966 |
| 11 | 11 | "Anonymous" | Unknown | Pat Flower | 27 June 1966 |
| 12 | 12 | "The Parking Ticket" | Eric Taylor | Max Colwell and Michael Wright | 4 July 1966 |
| 13 | 13 | "Should the Woman Pay" | Patrick Barton | Monte Miller | 11 July 1966 |
| 14 | 14 | "Marleen" | Unknown | Pat Flower | 18 July 1966 |
| 15 | 15 | "The Final Factor" | Ken Hannam | John Warwick | 25 July 1966 |
| 16 | 16 | "Done Away with It" | Henri Safran | Pat Flower | 1 August 1966 |
| 17 | 17 | "Blind Balance" | Unknown | Monte Miller | 8 August 1966 |
| 18 | 18 | "Haywire" | Pat Alexander | Creswick Jenkinson | 15 August 1966 |
| 19 | 19 | "Watch It" | Storry Walton | Richard Barry | 22 August 1966 |
| 20 | 20 | "Ticket to Nowhere" | Fred Maxian | John Bragg | 29 August 1966 |
| 21 | 21 | "The Voice" | Unknown | Kenneth Hayles | 5 September 1966 |
| 22 | 22 | "The Empty Day" | John Croyston | Pat Flower | 12 September 1966 |
| 23 | 23 | "The Decision" | Oscar Whitbread | John Warwick | 19 September 1966 |
| 24 | 24 | "The Lace Counter" | Unknown | Pat Flower | 26 September 1966 |
| 25 | 25 | "Objector" | Unknown | Tony Morphett | 3 October 1966 |
| 26 | 26 | "V.I.P.P." | Brian Faull | Pat Flower | 10 October 1966 |
| 27 | 27 | "Across the Bridge" | Pat Alexander | Liane Keen | 17 October 1966 |
| 28 | 28 | "Easy Terms" | Unknown | Pat Flower | 24 October 1966 |
| 29 | 29 | "A Small Wonder" | James Davern | Jeff Underhill | 31 October 1966 |
| 30 | 30 | "The Paradise Shanty" | Patrick Barton | Kevin McGrath | 7 November 1966 |

=== Season 2 ===
| No. overall | No. in season | Title | Directed by | Written by | Original release date |
|---|---|---|---|---|---|
| 31 | 1 | "A Touch of Gold" | John Croyston | Gwenda Painter | 22 July 1967 |
| 32 | 2 | "Slow Poison" | Oscar Whitbread | Allan Trevor | TBA |
| 33 | 3 | "Casualty" | Storry Walton | John Croyston | TBA |
| 34 | 4 | "Keep It Clean" | TBA | E.R. Thomas | TBA |
| 35 | 5 | "The Attack" | James Davern | Kenneth Hayles | TBA |
| 36 | 6 | "Enough to Make a Pair of Sailor's Trousers" | TBA | Barbara Vernon | TBA |
| 37 | 7 | "The Brass Guitar" | TBA | Oriel Gray | TBA |
| 38 | 8 | "John Forrester Awaits the Light" | Eric Taylor | Michael Boddy | TBA |
| 39 | 9 | "The Heat's On" | TBA | Pat Flower | TBA |
| 40 | 10 | "On the Hop" | Pat Alexander | Michael Laurence | TBA |
| 41 | 11 | "All Fall Down" | TBA | Michael Boddy | TBA |
| 42 | 12 | "Breakdown" | TBA | Michael Boddy | TBA |
| 43 | 13 | "The Five Sided Triangle" | Brian Faull | Brian Faull | TBA |

- The End Product written by Colin Free was intended for this series but not filmed until 1974 as a stand-alone play.

== Episodes made but not broadcast ==
- Shameless Hussies by Peter Kenna - about two teenage heiresses have problems with pink hairdos and blind dates - announced April 1966 as part of the first series but not broadcast
- The Widow Thrum by Peter Finnane who also wrote The Pigeon - announced in April 1966
- Shadow on the Wall - directed by Chris Muir - filmed in April 1967 not aired until 10 April 1968
- The Stay at Home starred Sydney Conabere, Frank Rich, Gerda Nicholson
- Caught Napping with Peter Collingwood, Ethel Lang, Nancye Stewart
- The Black Infuriator by Alexander MacDonald with Terry McDermott, Elaine Plumb, John Godfrey
- The House by David Sale starring Tom Farley, Nancye Stewart, Juliana Allan, Alistair Smart
- Boy with Banner - announced in 1966 but seemingly not broadcast - it was directed by Christopher Muir and starred Patricia Kennedy, Norman Kaye and Julie Day
- The Captain and the Cox'n by Kenneth Hailes
