= A Sleep of Prisoners =

Play by Christopher Fry

A Sleep of Prisoners is a 1951 verse play by Christopher Fry. It concerns four English prisoners of war locked up in a church overnight, and the Old Testament style dreams they have springing from an argument between them.

== Plot ==
Four English soldiers are trapped in a bombed out Cathedral. Private King attempts to strangle Private Able. Separated by Corporal Adams and Private Meadows they bed down for the night. The remainder of the play reveals the dreams of each soldier and their attitude to life and death.

== Background ==
Commissioned as part of the Festival of Britain, the anti-war drama, directed by Michael Macowan, opened at St. Thomas' church in Regent Street, London, in May 1951. It then toured churches around Britain with its cast of Stanley Baker, Denholm Elliott, Hugh Pryse and Leonard White. It was also performed in churches in America later the same year.

== Critical reception ==
T.C. Worsley wrote "Each of the dreams is dramatically conceived and touched off with that sharp sense of the comic incongruity of things which is Mr Fry's personal approach to life and words."

== 1951 TV adaptation ==
The play was broadcast live by the BBC in December, 1951. Wolf Rilla produced.

=== Cast ===
- John Slater as Pvt. David King
- Andrew Leigh as Pvt. Tim Meadows
- Robin Lloyd as Pvt. Peter Able
- Peter Williams/Joe Dorsey as Cpl. Joe Adams

== 1961 Perth TV Adaptation ==
A Sleep of Prisoners
- Directed by: Raymond Menmuir
- Country of origin: Australia
- Original language: English

Production
- Production company: ABC

Original release
- Network: ABC
- Release: February 1961

The play was broadcast live by the ABC from Perth in February 1961. Raymond Menmuir directed.

=== Cast ===
- Ron Haddrick as Private David King
- Philip Clarke as Private Peter Able
- Paul Nayton as Corporal Joe Adams
- James Bailey as Tim Meadows

=== Production ===
It was shot in St George's Cathedral with Michael Altria the lighting director.

=== Reception ===
The Bulletin TV critic called it "a triumph... must rank with the best in live television."

Some viewers felt the "rough talk" of soldiers in a cathedral was blasphemous. "I feel this is a very wrong interpretation," said Menmuir. "Actually, in the play the author, Christopher Fry, emphasises the part religion plays in the life of ordinary human beings."

== 1961 Brisbane TV Adaptation ==
A Sleep of Prisoners
- Based on: play by Christopher Fry
- Directed by: Raymond Menmuir
- Country of origin: Australia
- Original language: English

Production
- Producer: Fred Haynes
- Running time: 75 min
- Production company: ABC

Original release
- Network: ABC
- Release: 2 March 1961 (Brisbane)

The play was also filmed for Brisbane television in March 1961 with Ron Haddrick yet again. It was shot at St John's Cathedral in the first week of March.

=== Cast ===
- Ron Haddrick as Private David King
- Don McTaggart as Corporal Joe Adams
- Kerry Francis as Private Peter Able
- Frank Evans as Private Tim Meadows

=== Production ===
The cast consisted of four - imported Ron Haddrick, ad exec Don McTaggart and two professional actors. Menmuir said "this production will be different from anything yet attempted in Sydney or Melbourne. Having lived in Brisbane I knew the possibilities of the cathedral as the setting of Sleep of Prisoners. Already we have carried out detailed surveys with lighting men and engineers. They have proved completely satisfactory."

Haddrick arrived in Brisbane in early February for rehearsals, which mostly took place at a hall in West End.

Dean Baddley of St Johns said he knew Christopher Fry personally and felt he was a great Christian. "I am hoping we will equal if not better the Perth production," said Menmuir.

The ABC broadcast an 8 minute preview the night before the broadcast.
