= The Monkey Cage =

Australian Playhouse play (1966)

- Australian Playhouse episode
- Episode no.: Season 1 Episode 10
- Directed by: Wilf Buckler
- Teleplay by: Ruth Funner
- Original air date: 20 June 1966
- Running time: 30 mins

Episode chronology
← Previous "Antarctic Four"	Next → "Anonymous"

"The Monkey Cage" is the 10th television play episode of the first season of the Australian anthology television series Australian Playhouse. "The Monkey Cage" was written by Ruth Funner and directed by Wilf Buckler and originally aired on ABC on 20 June 1966. The episode was shot in Brisbane.

The National Archives of Australia have a version of the episode.

== Plot ==
Joe is a city building caretaker with an all-too-attractive wife. In the course of trying to throw out one of her admirers (David Yorston) the two get trapped in the lift. When fire breaks out they sink their personal difference in frantic attempts to call for help. Eventually, the firemen (Stanley Smith) turns up, averts danger, but makes little effort to free the prisoners when he finds the wife alone in the apartment.

== Cast ==
- John Gray as Joe
- Stanley Smith
- David Yorston
- Peter Hitcner

== Reception ==
The Sydney Morning Herald called it "a slight but entertaining piece admirably suited to its medium... The situation is treated with humour, the dialogue contains some good lines and the players and producer... all combine to give a lighthearted half-hour's amusement."

The Age said "it had one attractive feature, the acting of John Gray, who deserved a better vehicle."
