= Television play =

Television program genre

A television play is a television programming genre which is a drama performance broadcast from a multi-camera television studio, usually live in the early days of television but later recorded to tape. This is in contrast to a television movie, which employs the single-camera setup of film production.

== United Kingdom ==
From the 1950s until the early 1980s, the television play was a television programming genre in the United Kingdom. The genre was often associated with the social realist-influenced British drama style known as "kitchen sink realism", which depicted the social issues facing working-class families. Armchair Theatre (ABC, later Thames, 1956–1974), The Wednesday Play (BBC, 1964–1970) and Play for Today (BBC, 1970–1984) received praise from critics for their quality.

=== Armchair Theatre: 1956–1974 ===
Armchair Theatre was a British television drama anthology series, which ran on the ITV network from 1956 until 1968 in its original form, and was intermittently resurrected in the following few years until 1973. The Canadian producer Sydney Newman, who was ABC's Head of Drama from 1958 to 1962, turned Armchair Theatre into a vehicle for the generation of 'Angry Young Men' who tackled many difficult and controversial subjects in the realistic 'kitchen sink' style.

The programme was networked nationally on ITV on Sunday evenings, and often drew large audiences. Over 450 plays were made and broadcast under the Armchair... banner from 1956 to 1980. Among the best-known plays were No Trams to Lime Street (1959) by Alun Owen, and A Night Out (1960) by Harold Pinter.

Armchair Theatre was an important influence over later similar programmes such as the BBC's The Wednesday Play (1964–1970). This latter programme was initiated by Sydney Newman as a deliberate attempt to echo the success of Armchair Theatre after he had moved to the BBC in 1963.

=== The Wednesday Play: 1964–1970 ===
The Wednesday Play ran on BBC1 from 1964 to 1970 originated by Sydney Newman, by now the head of BBC Drama, with the policy of commissioned plays being "relevant to the lives of a mainstream popular audience." The goal was to find or commission work that "would be fast...telling an exciting narrative sparely" using material "that would more accurately reflect the experience of the audience." The series' producers, including James MacTaggart, hired "fresh new writers", whose new ideas led to the series gaining "the reputation for 'controversy' and 'outrage'." He also wanted to get away from the BBC's reputation of producing very 'safe' and unchallenging drama programmes, to produce something with more bite and vigour.

The series gained a reputation for presenting original contemporary social dramas, although adaptations from other sources also featured, and brought political issues to the attention of a mass audience. Director Ken Loach made two highly regarded plays for the series: an adaptation of Nell Dunn's Up the Junction (1965) and Cathy Come Home (1966), the documentary-style drama of a homeless young couple's attempt to keep their children. The Wednesday Play came to an end in 1970 when the transmission day changed, and the series morphed into Play for Today.

=== Play for Today: 1970–1984 ===
Play for Today was a British television anthology drama series, produced by the BBC and transmitted on BBC1 from 1970 to 1984. Over 300 original plays, most between an hour and ninety minutes in length, were transmitted during the fourteen-year period the series aired. Play for Today featured gritty contemporary social realist dramas, historical pieces, fantasies, biopics and science-fiction. Most pieces were written directly for television, but there were also occasional adaptations of novels and stage plays.

Some well remembered plays from the series included Mike Leigh's Nuts in May (1976) and Abigail's Party (1977), which examined the dysfunctional interactions between neighbours and married couples. Some plays, such as Rumpole of the Bailey, were later made into series.

=== Decline of genre: mid-1980s ===
Television plays became less common from the 1980s, because of a trend in 1980s television drama towards the television film which might receive limited cinema screenings before being shown on Channel 4. Another factor was a greater reliance on continuing series of the police or medical genres in a growing multi-channel environment. Nonetheless, television plays were regarded as a benchmark of high-quality British television drama.

== United States ==
In the United States, television plays were seen mainly from 1948 to 1961, the period of live TV dramas which framed the Golden Age of Television.

== Soviet Union ==
In the Soviet Union the broadcast-only TV plays were produced since 1938 until early 1950s, later they started being recorded via kinescope.

The genre was abandoned in mid-1980s.

== Russia ==
An attempt to revive the genre was made by the Russia-Culture TV channel in early 2000s by producing several small TV plays and one full-time play, Leonid Zorin's "Copper Grandma" ("Медная бабушка"). Similar efforts within the same time frame were made by a local state TV company of Nizhny Novgorod.

== Poland ==
Teatr Telewizji (The Television Theatre) is the organisation responsible for television plays for Telewizja Polska, the Polish public broadcaster. The first play aired on November 8, 1953.

== See also ==
- Radio drama
