= Luther (1964 film) =

- Genre: history
- Based on: play Luther by John Osborne
- Written by: Phillip Grenville Mann
- Directed by: Christopher Muir
- Starring: Terry Norris
- Country of origin: Australia
- Original language: English

Production
- Running time: 90 mins
- Production company: Australian Broadcasting Commission

Original release
- Release: 15 July 1964 (Melbourne); 22 July 1964 (Sydney); 29 July 1964 (Brisbane)

Luther is a 1964 TV play broadcast by the Australian Broadcasting Corporation. It was adapted by Phillip Grenville Mann from the 1961 play by John Osborne. It was directed in Melbourne by Christopher Muir and starred Terry Norris in the title role.

== Premise ==
It is a biographical play about the life of Luther during the years of 1506–1530. The play shows his marriage and the interactions he had with the people in his life.

== Cast ==
- Terry Norris as Martin Luther
- Syd Conabere as Knight
- Douglas Kelly as Johann Tetzel
- Michael Duffield as Staupitz
- Brian James as Cajetan
- William Lloyd as Prior
- James Lynch as Hans
- Peter Aanensen as Lucas
- George Whaley as Brother Weinand
- Beverley Dunn as Katherine
- Glen Farmer as Militz
- Michael Cole as Pope Leo X
- Keith Lee as Eck
- John Royle as Emperor
- Ian Neill as Ulrich
- Ray Angel as archbishop
- Colin McEwan as one of the monks

== Production ==
Osborne's play was first performed in 1961. The play had a cast of 34 and was headlined by Norris, who that year had already been seen in Nude with Violin, The Sponge Room and The Physicists. Colin McEwan, who played a monk, was a radio personality, moving into acting. It was designed by Paul Cleveland. It was the TV dramatic acting debut of singer Michael Cole.

== Reception ==
The Age said it was "baffling". This review prompted a letter of response from Chris Muir.

The Sydney Morning Herald called it "quite painfully cramped and distorted... Norris made Luther hardly credible... the play seemed to take place in the vacuum"

The Canberra Times said "Christopher Muir's production, the best so far this year, was among the most successful of all local productions, at least since Ray Mcnnuir's departure. The first moments of the play, in particular, made spectacular television."
