= A Man for All Seasons =

A Man for All Seasons may refer to:

== Theater and film ==
- A Man for All Seasons (play), 1960 by Robert Bolt
- A Man for All Seasons (1964 film), an Australian TV adaptation of Bolt's play
- A Man for All Seasons (1966 film), a British adaptation of the play
- A Man for All Seasons (1988 film), an American television adaptation of the play

== Literature ==
- A quotation from Vulgaria (1520) by Robert Whittington
- A Man for All Seasons, a 2010 novel by Heather MacAllister

== Music ==
- "A Man for All Seasons", a song by Al Stewart from Time Passages
- "A Man for All Seasons", a song by Concord Dawn from Chaos by Design
- "A Man for All Seasons", a song by Robbie Williams from the 2003 film Johnny English
- "A Man for All Seasons", a song by Stephen Ashbrook
