= Travelling North =

1979 play by David Williamson

- Poster for original production (Nimrod Theatre, Sydney, 1979)
- Original language: English
- Written by: David Williamson

Premiere
- Date: 1979

Travelling North is a play by Australian playwright David Williamson premiered in 1979, and published as a text in 1980, telling the story of a late-life romance and relocation to a warmer climate (the "north" of the title) of Frank, a newly retired engineer, and Frances, his somewhat younger chosen companion/girlfriend. It was first performed at the Nimrod Theatre, Sydney, and was subsequently the basis for a 1987 film of the same name starring Leo McKern and Julia Blake. The play—in essence a serious drama with some comedic touches—has been called "a deeply moving comedy with insightful ruminations on youth, vigour, aging and death" and is considered one of Williamson's best loved works, that is still performed on occasion 30–40(+) years after it was first written.

== Overview ==
Based initially on a real life situation in the family of Williamson's second wife, the play deals with issues of politics (working for a brighter future for the world by different means), family dynamics (in particular the main protagonists' relationships with their adult daughters plus an unseen son), finding love later in life (plus the implications of the latter), and aspects of personal growth: Frances, who has become something of a slave to her adult children, must learn to take charge of her own life, while Frank, who has got through life being something of a bully, must learn to become a better person to those around him, and be willing to accept assistance from others as needed. Frank in particular needs to reappraise and re-order his own priorities in the light of his own approaching death, which happens at the end of the play. It has been called "a deeply moving comedy with insightful ruminations on youth, vigour, aging and death." The action takes place between 1969, when we first meet Frank and Frances, through 1970, when the couple first move to their new cottage in the North and make the acquaintance of selected locals, through to "election day" in December 1972, the day of Frank's demise.

The concept of "travelling north" pertains to the Southern Hemisphere (the play is set in Australia), where some persons, particularly those entering retirement, are attracted to travel or relocate from the colder southern regions of the country—Melbourne in this instance—to the warmer, sub-tropical or tropical regions of northern New South Wales and/or Queensland for a more relaxed and predominantly open air lifestyle, with fewer concessions required for cold-weather living.

The play was first performed at the Nimrod Theatre, Sydney, on 22 August 1979, with Frank Wilson as Frank, Carol Raye as Frances, Graham Rouse as Freddy, and Henri Szeps as the local doctor, Saul; Frances and Frank's adult children were played by Julie Hamilton, Jennifer Hagan and Deborah Kennedy as Sophie, Helen and Joan, respectively. Subsequently, the play was adapted by Williamson himself, with some changes to the original plot locations, into a 1987 Ben Gannon-produced film of the same name, which starred Leo McKern as Frank, Julia Blake as Frances and Graham Kennedy as Freddy (his final film role), with Henri Szeps reprising his original stage role as Saul. In the printed edition, the play is dedicated to Hope Wilkinson (for further information, refer "Background and origins" section).

== Plot ==
The play begins in a seaside campsite, somewhere beyond Noosa on the Sunshine Coast in Queensland, in autumn 1969. Frank, described as "over seventy", and his companion Frances, aged "about fifty-five", have known each other for about a year. They are discussing the pleasures of their holiday/road trip to date from cold, rainy Melbourne in the south, and Frank expresses his desire to retire in the tropics north of Townsville, to which Frances is agreeable. The next five scenes are set back in Melbourne, where the couple's plans are being digested by Frances' two grown-up daughters who do not approve. The following five scenes are set in Tweed Heads (Note: Tweed Heads is now a busy—and expensive—sub-tropical town in northern New South Wales with shopping malls, a population of over 9,000 as at 2021, and a motorway running through it. In the early 1970s when the play is set, it would have been much quieter; it is described as a "township" (in common Australian usage, a small town) with a small number of facilities in the play's dialogue, and in any case the cottage appears to be somewhere on its outskirts, off the bitumen road system and not connected to town water or sewerage.) in the subtropical north of New South Wales, where Frank and Frances occupy a previously neglected cottage, and include the couple's interactions with Freddy, an initially annoying but kindly neighbour, and Saul, the local doctor, who advises Frank to "take things easy" on account of bouts of angina and some lung trouble. Subsequently Frank and Frances return to Melbourne for a visit where they are struck by the cold weather. Various home truths emerge regarding Frances' and Frank's past family relationships; Frank has a major heart attack and ends up in hospital. By act two, scene eleven the couple are back in the cottage at Tweed Heads and Frank's health is deteriorating further. Frances buys Frank a special reclining chair for his seventy-seventh birthday which the cantankerous Frank initially disparages but later accepts. Meanwhile Frances is becoming increasing irritated by Frank's boorishness and says she is going back to Melbourne, "possibly for good". She does travel back to Melbourne to join her daughters but eventually they reconcile over the telephone, with Frank apologising for his poor behaviour. She returns to Frank at the cottage and accepts Frank's proposal of marriage, which he insists should take place in Sydney, much against Saul's medical advice. They travel to Sydney for their wedding (and also to attend an art exhibition) and then return to the cottage where Frank's health rapidly gives out; he passes away listening to his favourite classical music in the chair that Frances gave him. A note to be opened after his death is read in which he advises Frances to travel back south to her family and avoid getting "caught up in the misfortunes of any other old crocks around the district", a not-so-subtle reference to Freddy and Saul, who have both already made overtures to Frances that they would "look after" her in the event that anything happens to Frank. However, when Saul asks Frances what her plans are now, she says that she thinks she will continue to "go travelling further north".

== Characters ==
There are nine characters in the play, although two (the wedding celebrant and a gallery attendant) are only incidental in nature, appearing in just one scene each. They are discussed below in the order in which they are presented in the "characters list" at the start of the published text of the play.

=== Frances ===
Frances, around fifty-five at the opening of the play, is a somewhat demure and reticent character who has spent her recent years making herself available for the needs of her adult daughters in Melbourne rather than thinking of herself; catching the eye of Frank, at least fifteen years her senior and on the cusp of retirement, she allows him to open the possible door to her own fulfilment through travel and relocation to the tropics, although she does not want to completely sever her ties with the cultural life of the city/s. From information imparted during the play, we learn that she was married but divorced her husband after six years because she had "no respect for his intelligence or integrity", bringing up their two children alone by running a boarding house, although when money was tight she sent the younger daughter, Helen to live with her (Frances') brother for four years between the ages of 8 and 12, a fact that Helen finds hard to forgive. There was also not enough money to send the older daughter, Sophie, to University after finishing school, a fact that Sophie rectified from her own resources at a later age.

=== Frank ===
Frank, a widower, is a newly retired ex- civil engineer in his seventies (he has his seventy-seventh birthday in 1972 according to the play, so when we first meet him, in 1969, he will be around 74), who has spent much of his life fighting for worker rights under the guise of the Australian Communist Party; we learn that he stood, unsuccessfully, as a Communist Party candidate for the wealthy Melbourne suburb of Toorak in the 1930s, and remained a committed communist until the Hungarian Uprising in 1956, and that the construction firm for which he was working sacked him when he was 59, depriving him of some of his superannuation entitlements. Subsequently, however, he worked again successfully and ended up running a firm that employed 700 people. He exudes an air of energy and vitality which belies the fact that his health will shortly fail and he will soon need all of the support he can get. He has got through life thus far by being rational, normally getting his own way, and avoiding emotional involvement even with his own, now grown up children. Although he initially professes that Frances will be his companion, not his slave, he is not very true to his word until late in the play when he finds that his boorish and apparently uncaring behavior has driven Frances away, at which point he realises that his behaviour has to change if he has any chance of winning her back.

When Frank first visits Saul's surgery (and again at the wedding in Sydney), we learn that his surname is Brown.

=== Sophie ===
Sophie is Frances' elder daughter, "about thirty" when introduced in Act one, scene 2; she is most like her mother, non-judgmental but a little reticent. She tends to take her mother's side in discussions between herself and her younger sister. With the family unable to afford to support her at University, she became a teacher but has since graduated and is writing a thesis. Her husband, Jim is a professor; they have several children, and live in Melbourne.

=== Helen ===
Helen is Frances' younger daughter, in her late twenties when introduced. She is described as "the more direct and incisive of the two", is somewhat resentful of the world in general, and in particular of her mother's relationship with Frank. She is married to Martin, a salesman who tends to treat her with indifference most of the time; they have three children, and live in Melbourne. At one point we learn that she has been helping her mother out financially, "sending her money for years", much to Frank's consternation when he finds this out.

=== Joan ===
Joan is Frank's adult daughter (he also has a son, Eric, who we do not meet). Joan, whom we meet only in one Melbourne scene, appears to be well adjusted to her father's idiosyncrasies but, when put on the spot, tells him a few home truths about how badly he treated Eve, Frank's deceased wife and the children's mother, and also that Eric is not interested in meeting up with him because once again, he feels that Frank did not treat him well. Joan is a feminist, telling her father that she is "a little bit hesitant to become a wife and mother right at the moment."

=== Freddy Wicks ===
Freddy is Frank and Frances' immediate neighbour to the cottage at Tweed Heads; he lives alone (being a widower) in the "big house on the hill" and is introduced as someone keen to make their acquaintance (to Frank's annoyance) and is characterised by kind gestures in their direction. He is described as "a jovial man in his sixties" who fought in World War 2, supports Australia's current involvement in the Vietnam War and is proud of his military service, which is at odds with Frank's world view. Nevertheless Frank begrudgingly accepts Freddy's friendship and assistance by the end, when he needs it most, saying in his posthumous note that he hopes both Freddy and Saul will help Frances with the necessary arrangements.

=== Saul Morgenstein ===
Saul is the local doctor (General Practitioner or "G.P.") whom Frank visits for his range of health checks, and who attempts to advise Frank on his necessary medications and lifestyle modifications as the latter's health deteriorates. Franks regularly spars with him regarding his own views on the treatments required, leaving Saul somewhat exasperated, but the two do eventually become friends. Saul (who has his own prognosis of gradual illness and death) enters a bet that whomever of them dies first has to pay the other ten dollars, a bet that Frank loses in the end. Both Saul and Freddy recognise Frances' predicament in having to deal with the cantankerous Frank, and offer to "look after" her in the event of Franks's eventual demise, a situation that it seems Frances will not ultimately take up.

=== Wedding Celebrant ===
The Celebrant appears only briefly, in the scene of Frank and Frances' wedding in Sydney. He is somewhat condescending to the participants, professing to find it "a wonderful thing when people in the autumn of their lives find love". To which Frank retorts, "Then let's get started, shall we, before autumn turn into winter."

=== Gallery Attendant ===
The gallery attendant, a female, appears only in a scene where Frank and Frances gatecrash a preview of a supposed Sydney art exhibition by noted Australian artist Brett Whiteley. They gain entry after lying to the attendant that they are in fact Whiteley's parents.

== Issues ==
=== Political ===
The unnamed commentator on the back cover of the 1980 edition of the play text says: "Travelling North is David Williamson's tribute to the generation that fought for change in Australia from the 30's to the 70's; and reaches the rueful conclusion that the legacy of such self-determination is narrow-mindedness and the need for love". Elsewhere, Philip Parsons writes: "The end of the play, when Frank returns with Frances from voting for Whitlam, (Note: The successful election of the Labor (centre left) Whitlam government that day, following 23 years of continuous Coalition (right wing) government in Australia, would have come as something of a vindication of Frank's left wing views, that government in its first term achieving a number of "progressive" goals including the termination of military conscription and the end of Australian involvement in the Vietnam War.) announcing 'the tide that is going to sweep in a new era', may at first seem a bitter irony in the light of the subsequent events. Yet not so. This moment has been carefully anticipated by Frank's wistful memory of his Communist hopes betrayed by Stalin: 'There was a wonderful period after the War when Fascism had been defeated and we thought a new order of justice and fraternity was going to sweep the world. It didn't turn out that simple.' ... The point is that we must leave disillusion and defeat behind us and travel on." Parsons continues: "The political judgment is validated by the personal. Politics, no more than personal life, can be approached as social engineering. It is not enough to love mankind in general. One must love the Freddies and the Sauls – human beings in particular. Only when doctrinaire, rational passion is infused with a passion for ordinary people will Socialism wear a human face."

=== Societal ===
Williamson's plays have been described as "holding a mirror up to contemporary Australian life" and Travelling North is no exception in this respect, portraying several societal issues of the day via the mouths of various of the characters. These include whether or not Australia's willing participation in the Vietnam War should be lauded or disparaged, whether or not society should frown upon a couple living together (back in the late 1960s) without being married (atheist Frank has no problems with this, Catholic Frances has reservations), whether substantial age mis-matches within couples is a good or a bad idea, and expectations for the continuing role of parents (and grandparents) in their offspring's lives once the latter have become adults. It might also be remarked that the couple's planned, as well as actual relocation anticipates the type of "sea change" or "tree change" exit from city life for more rural surroundings that has become more commonplace—and promoted via popular "lifestyle" TV programmes—in recent decades, but was no doubt less common in the period during which the play is set.

They play can also be read in terms of Williamson's interest in the Australian political landscape of the day: whereas Don's Party, written in 1971 around the unsuccessful 1969 bid by the Australian Labor Party to topple the incumbent Conservative order of the day, has a tone of associated despondency, Travelling North, written 8 years later, presages the successful return of Labor (plus its associated values) to Australian government following its 1972 election campaign, and retains a tone of optimism despite the fact that Frank will not be there to witness it.

=== Personal ===
Although there are some asides regarding the personal circumstances of both Frances' and Frank's adult children, and the introduction of the characters Freddy and Saul provide foils for Frank and also some comic relief, the main drama concerns the personal and life journeys of the two main characters, Frank and Frances. In the introduction to the published play, Philip Parsons writes: "Travelling north, Frances needs to escape from her own sense of guilt. Frank, untroubled by guilt, feels he needs to get away from the pressure of people to examine his life for its meaning. They both have a lot to do."

Frank is nearing the end of his life (although he does not know it), imagines a retirement of fishing and generally lazing about in the sun, reading books and listening to music, accompanied by the "companionship" of Frances, however he has not fully appreciated her needs and treats her, as well as his new friends, quite badly. Frank's journey is to realise his own character flaws and to learn to treat those he loves, and the people who become his friends, with more kindness and empathy, although he retains enough of the old argumentative Frank to provide some comic relief, especially in relation to his verbal sparring with his doctor Saul.

Frances, on the other hand, appears to be somewhat submissive, both in respect to the demands of her adult children and to Frank's plans for his/their future, until at last she can stand it no more and tells Frank at one point that he is a bully and a despot and she is leaving him to go back to Melbourne. It is at this point that Frances rediscovers her inner strength (she has already called upon it earlier in her life when she left her original husband and worked to bring up the children on her own) and by almost ending it with Frank as well, brings him to a better understanding of his own actions. By the end of the story, Frances is strong enough to be her own person and decide for herself what she wants to do with the next stage of her life, without feeling guilt towards the children she is leaving or the necessity to lean for support on either Freddy or Saul.

== Background and origins ==
Williamson says the inspiration for the play came soon after he met his second wife Kristin and she took him up to the Central Coast of New South Wales to visit her mother Hope. Hope had recently remarried an older man called Wilkie. Williamson:

There was more than a little hint of disapproval from her two daughters about the new liaison, which I used in the play, but I found them an inspiring couple. Wilkie was a ferociously intelligent man, a former electrical engineer and ex-communist with pronounced opinions on just about everything. Hope was gentler but with a wonderful quality of perception and understanding. They both impressed me and, some years later, the image of them both living in a verdant, sunlit subtropical paradise re-entered my mind and became Travelling North. In fact, by the time I wrote it, Wilkie had died. I asked Hope whether I could write the play and she trusted me and was most cooperative. She told me anecdotes about a busybody neighbour who had annoyed the hell out of Wilkie and a long-suffering doctor who had to answer Wilkie's probing questions about the quality of treatment he was delivering. These characters found their way into the story. I think Hope genuinely liked the play, but my wife Kristin and her sister were a little less enthusiastic, particularly when Frank, in the play, refers to them as "Goneril and Regan".

"This play was not to do with me, and there was no 'me' character in it," he later said. "It was a dispassionate – hopefully – observation of a journey we all must make. I tried to make it as truthful, emotionally, as I could."

== Critical reception ==
In his 1980 introduction to the published version of the play, academic Philip Parsons writes that "Scenes are to be compared, connected, slotted together in a growing structure that will be complete only with the last scene of all. No form could more perfectly express the search for meaning in a life shortly to end, which is the theme of Travelling North."

According to the Sydney Theatre Company, the Australian The Daily Telegraph called the play "one of Williamson's finest works from his golden period" and the Sydney Theatre Company, in notes accompanying its own production, called it "Williamson's autumn sonata", describing it as "Williamson's affectionate, insightful play, with its nosy neighbours, sexagenarian raunch and family wrangles", also stating that "it swiftly became an important play in the Australian canon".

Writing for Australian Book Review on the play's first release, Mary Lord wrote: "David Williamson's newest play wittily affirms that love, adventure, and increasing self-knowledge are not the exclusive preserves of the young. ... Travelling North is not concerned with offering glib panaceas to hopeful geriatrics or illusory prospects of perennial Indian summers for the elderly. It is a very original play, not merely in its plotting but with the revelation of its principal characters and with its overriding interest in the changing relationship between them. ... The play is built up of twenty scenes (Note: In actuality the number is 33; the author of this review has mistakenly counted only those in Act Two.) balancing and interacting with each other to reveal the complex relationships between the characters. The writing is extraordinarily economical, always advancing the forward movement of the play and at the same time inviting the range of emotional responses from sorrow to laughter that we encounter in the real world which this play so convincingly reflects."

== Contemporary relevance ==
After an interval of 30–40(+) years since the play's original release, some critics have found the film dated to their own tastes, for example reviewing a 2008 production, Nigel Munro-Wallis wrote: "The big questions on everyone's lips in the foyer before the opening of this touring production centred on whether or not the play itself has enough in terms of universal themes (love in one's older years, sea change and so on) to speak to a 21st century audience or whether or not the cultural and political references would simply date the play and thus make it, while perhaps somewhat quaint, irrelevant. ... We no longer find the notion of moving away from one's family and friends so unusual – families find themselves scattered all over the world as a matter of routine these days. We no longer find the idea of two people in their older years living together so shocking. People of both genders and all ages live together without being married as a matter of course these days and hence the rather quaint moralistic tone of the play only serves to sound rather self-righteous and old fashioned."

By contrast, Suzanne Rath reviewing the Sydney Theatre Company's 2014 revival of the play wrote: "Given that Australians have recently witnessed another political change which has forced examination of the national identity, this revival of David Williamson’s classic work, Travelling North, is a timely one. ... Set in the years from 1969–1972 and ultimately leading up to the election of Gough Whitlam, Travelling North captures the themes of change and unrest through the story of Frank (Bryan Brown) and Frances (Alison Whyte) ... Travelling North is an excellent character study which exposes many of the beliefs still held about our society; from the good neighbour, Freddy (Andrew Tighe), to the small town doctor, Saul (Russell Kiefel), many stereotypes and behaviours are recognisable." Also in 2014, reviewing the same production, Irina Dunn wrote: "David Williamson's Travelling North still has the emotional power to move audiences 35 years after it was first staged and remains one of the playwright's best plays. ... Williamson’s witty one-liners are liberally sprinkled through the script to leaven the increasing sense of doom that overtakes the couple as they realise the seriousness of Frank's illness. ... the play raises serious questions about family, loyalty, tolerance, compassion, the intersection of the personal with the political, and in the end produces a resolution that affirms the human spirit and capacity to love, despite the obstacles."

== Film ==
The play was adapted by its author into a 1987 Australian film of the same name directed by Carl Schultz and starring Leo McKern as Frank, Julia Blake as Frances, Graham Kennedy as Freddy, and Henri Szeps as Saul. In the film, the main "northern" location is changed to be Port Douglas in far north Queensland, where Freddy and Saul reside, and at the end of the film it is implied that Frances chooses to remain there.
