= Misanthrope (disambiguation) =

Misanthrope may refer to:

- Misanthropy, a generalized contempt or hatred of humanity

== Theatre ==
- The Misanthrope, a 1666 play by Molière
- Dyskolos, sometimes translated The Misanthrope, an Ancient Greek comedy by Menander

== Music ==
- The Misanthrope (EP), a 1996 EP by the melodic death metal band Darkest Hour
- Misanthrope (band), French metal band
- Mis-An-Thrope, the debut studio album by Ded
- "Misanthrope", a song by Death from 1995 album Symbolic

== Art ==
- The Misanthrope (Bruegel), painting by Pieter Bruegel the Elder from 1568

== Film ==
- The Misanthrope (1923 film), a 1923 German silent film directed by Rudolf Walther-Fein
- The Misanthrope (1974 film), a 1974 Australian film adaptation of the play by Molière

== See also ==
- Misanthrope Immortel, sixth studio album by French metal band Misanthrope
- Symphony for a Misanthrope, fifth studio album by progressive metal /rock band Magellan
- Misanthropic (album), a 1997 EP by Dismember
- Misanthropy Records, a British record label
- Philanthropy, the love of humanity
- Misandry, the hatred of, contempt for, or prejudice against men or boys
- Misogyny, the hatred of, contempt for, or prejudice against women or girls
