= Julia Blake =

Australian actress (born 1937)

- Born: 1937 (age 88–89); Bristol, England
- Other name: Julie Blake
- Education: Bristol University; Bristol Old Vic
- Occupation: Actress
- Years active: 1956–present
- Spouse: Terry Norris (m. 1962; died 2023)
- Children: 3
- Family: Robert Connolly (son-in-law)

Julia Blake (born 1937) is a British-Australian actress, notable for numerous film and TV roles, particularly in Australia. She also acted in the theatre.

== Early life and education ==
Julia Blake was born in Bristol, England, in 1937. Her father Fred Blake, a commercial artist, was married to wife Edna, a homemaker. Her parents were conservative Primitive Congregationalist parishioners who attended church three times on Sundays. As a child, Blake trained in ballet and elocution.

Blake initially also had ambitions to be an artist and attended Bristol University, receiving an honours degree in drama and French. She played the role of Sally Bowles in a production of I Am a Camera in her last year of university. Peter O'Toole attended the show, bringing her flowers and encouraging her to attend drama school. She subsequently undertook her training in theatre at the Bristol Old Vic, after winning a scholarship. She lived with her parents until the age of 22.

== Career ==
=== Theatre ===
Blake has had an extensive stage career, beginning in repertory theatre in the UK, where she worked with her husband-to-be Terry Norris in productions of Angels in Love and Two Faces of Murder.

She continued her work in theatre in Australia from 1963 through to 2017, performing frequently with Norris. She appeared in a 1966 production of Private Yuk Objects at Melbourne's Russell Street Theatre. In 1970, she appeared in The Rope Dancers, winning an Erik Award for her performance. In 1977, she was in both The Cherry Orchard and The Crucible and in 1979 she featured in a production of Uncle Vanya.

Blake toured for four months with a 1988 production of The Browning Version. In 1990, she appeared in Noël Coward’s Present Laughter, while rehearsing for her role as Belle in the play Another Time, which she performed in the following year.

In 2004, Blake toured nationally in a HIT Productions staging of The Gin Game. In 2006, she appeared alongside Jason Donovan as Else Klingenfeldt in Festen, for Melbourne Theatre Company.

Blake later performed in a 2013 stage production of 4,000 Miles at Melbourne's Red Stitch Actors Theatre. The same year, she performed once again in The Crucible for Melbourne Theatre Company.

Her most recent stage role was playing Genevieve Marduk in a 2017 MTC production of John.

=== Television ===
After an early role as Eurasian prostitute Hong Kong Anna in teleplay The Hot Potato Boys in 1963, Blake played guest roles in legal drama Consider Your Verdict. Further TV plays followed, before she eventually landed the role of Elaine Thomas in local TV drama Bellbird in 1972, remaining with the series for four years. During her time on Bellbird, Blake had roles in several Crawford Productions police procedural series, including Division 4 (1969–1975), Matlock Police (1973–1975) and Homicide (1975).

In 1978, Blake appeared as Cook in the miniseries Against the Wind, before playing the part of Jewish mother Eva Goldman in the series Twenty Good Years, the next year. A supporting role in the Ned Kelly miniseries The Last Outlaw followed in 1980, where she appeared alongside John Jarratt and Steve Bisley.

Blake made several appearances in cult television series Prisoner (known internationally as Prisoner Cell Block H). She initially had a regular role as Evelyn Randall in season 3 (1981) and a guest role as Alice Dodds in season 5 (1983). She rejoined the series in 1986, during its eighth and final season, playing her best known role of Nancy McCormack, a Wentworth Detention Centre inmate, who took the blame for a crime her son committed.

In 1985, Blake starred in miniseries The Dunera Boys, which won her a Best Supporting Actress award at the Penguin Awards the following year. Another award-winning turn came in 1989, with her performance in miniseries Edens Lost, earning her a Best Actress accolade at both the Australian Film Institute Awards and the Sammy Awards.

She had roles in several other miniseries throughout her career including Women of the Sun (1982), Under Capricorn, and Sword of Honour (1986) and A Difficult Woman (1998). American miniseries included Salem's Lot (2004), playing Eva Prunier opposite Rob Lowe and Donald Sutherland and The Starter Wife (2007) with American actress Debra Messing, in which Blake played supporting character, Mrs. Caldecott.

Blake later had a supporting role as Louisa's feisty, activist mother, Minna Franklin in Bed of Roses from 2008 to 2011. During this period she also played Ellie, the mother of former prime minister Bob Hawke (played by Richard Roxburgh) in 2010 biographical TV movie Hawke, with her husband Norris playing his father Clem.

Blake's numerous guest roles have included Moynihan (1978), Cop Shop (1978–1981), Holiday Island (1981), Carson's Law (1983), Zoo Family (1985), and Winners (1985). Later guest credits include SeaChange (1999), Blue Heelers (2001), All Saints (2004), City Homicide (2007), Winners & Losers (2011) and Miss Fisher's Murder Mysteries (2013). She also appeared in a season 4 episode of House Husbands (2015), reuniting her with her former Last Dance co-star, Firass Dirani.

=== Film ===
On the big screen, Blake has also appeared in numerous films, including 1977 Australian classic The Getting of Wisdom and 1979 award-winning drama My Brilliant Career – the latter starring Judy Davis, Sam Neill and Wendy Hughes. Other early roles included Ozploitation horror film Patrick (1978) in which she played Matron Cassidy and thriller Snapshot (1979) opposite Sigrid Thornton.

She was a favourite of director Paul Cox, featuring in several of his films, including Lonely Hearts (1982), Man of Flowers (1983) My First Wife (1984) and Cactus (1986).

Blake starred opposite Leo McKern and Graham Kennedy as Frances, in 1987 film Travelling North, based on the play of the same name by David Williamson. The role saw her nominated for Best Actress at the Australian Film Institute Awards that year. In 1989, she had a part in television film The Magistrate, followed by a lead role in 1990 thriller Father, playing Lithuanian refugee, Iva Zetnick. Her role in the latter earned her a Best Supporting Actress accolade at the 1990 Australian Film Institute Awards.

In 2000, Blake played the lead role of Claire in another of Paul Cox's films, the romantic drama Innocence, alongside Bud Tingwell and her husband Terry Norris. Her portrayal saw her nominated for a Best Actress award at the Australian Film Institute Awards. A further Cox film followed, with 2004 drama Human Touch, opposite Jacqueline McKenzie.

In 2009, Blake starred as Heather Hudson in American superhero blockbuster X-Men Origins: Wolverine, alongside fellow Australian actor Hugh Jackman. Shot at Sydney's Fox Studios, the film utilised several other Australian actors, including Peter O’Brien and Max Cullen. The following year, Blake appeared in The Boys are Back, which saw her nominated for another Australian Film Institute Award.

Blake next had a starring role opposite Firass Dirani in 2012 psychological thriller Last Dance as lead character, Holocaust survivor Ulah Lippmann. American actress Gena Rowlands was originally cast in the role, but had to drop out two weeks before filming, as her work visa was cancelled.

In 2015, Blake appeared in Looking for Grace, alongside Richard Roxburgh and Radha Mitchell, and The Dressmaker opposite Kate Winslet, Judy Davis and Liam Hemsworth. In 2016, she had a lead role alongside Anthony LaPaglia in A Month of Sundays, at the age of 79. The following year, she had a role in teen drama film Dance Academy: The Movie. Her most recent film role was 2020 mystery thriller The Dry starring Eric Bana.

Her other film credits of note include An Indecent Obsession (1985), Georgia (1988), Hotel de Love (1996), Matching Jack (2010) and Don't Be Afraid of the Dark (2010).

=== Other ===
As a long-standing advocate for Australian content on screen, Blake served on the board of Film Victoria in the 1990s.

In 2018, together with actor husband Terry Norris, Blake was the recipient of the Equity Lifetime Achievement Award at the Equity Ensemble Awards.

== Personal life ==
While working in repertory theatre in Yorkshire, England, Blake met Australian-born actor Terry Norris. The couple married on 24 March 1962, between a matinee and evening performance, before spending their honeymoon in Scarborough, North Yorkshire, learning lines for their next play together.

Blake moved to Australia together with Norris in 1963. She lost their first child, a daughter to cot death, but the couple went on to have three other children – Dominic, Jane and Sarah. She took a hiatus from acting in the 1970s to raise their children, and another extended break in the early 1990s, when an ongoing back-to-back run of television and stage productions lead to exhaustion and stress.

Blake and Norris's daughters followed them into the acting profession. Their son-in-law Robert Connolly is a director, having worked on miniseries The Slap and Barracuda, and 2009 film Balibo. By 2018, Blake and Norris also had four grandchildren.

== Awards and honours ==
Year	Work	Award	Category	Result	Ref.
1970	The Rope Dancers	Erik Awards		Won	
1986	The Dunera Boys	Penguin Awards	Best Performance by a Supporting Actress in a One-off Drama	Won	
1987	Travelling North	Australian Film Institute Awards	Best Actress in a Leading Role	Nominated	
1989	Edens Lost	Australian Film Institute Awards	Best Lead Actress in a Television Drama or Miniseries	Won	
1989	Edens Lost	Sammy Awards	Best Actress in a Television Drama	Won	
1990	Father	Australian Film Institute Awards	Best Actress in a Supporting Role	Won	
2000	Innocence	Australian Film Institute Awards	Best Actress in a Leading Role	Nominated	
2010	The Boys Are Back	Australian Film Institute Awards	Best Actress in a Supporting Role	Nominated	
2018	Julia Blake & Terry Norris	Equity Ensemble Awards	Equity Lifetime Achievement Award	Honoured	

== Filmography ==
=== Film ===
Year	Title	Role	Type
1973	Salome		Short film
1977	The Getting of Wisdom	Isabella Shepherd	Feature film
1978	Patrick	Matron Cassidy	Feature film
1978	The Forbidden		Short film
1979	My Brilliant Career	Mum	Feature film
1979	Snapshot (aka One More Minute)	Mrs. Bailey	Feature film
1982	Lonely Hearts	Pamela	Feature film
1983	Man of Flowers	Art Teacher	Feature film
1984	My First Wife	Kirstin	Feature film
1985	An Indecent Obsession	Matron	Feature film
1986	Cactus	Club Speaker	Feature film
1987	Travelling North	Frances	Feature film
1988	Georgia	Elizabeth	Feature film
1990	Father	Iya Zetnick	Feature film
1995	Mushrooms	Flo	Feature film
1996	Hotel de Love	Edith Dunne	Feature film
1999	Passion	Queen Alexandra	Feature film
2000	Innocence	Claire	Feature film
2003	The Forest	Margot	Short film
2004	Human Touch	Anna's Mother	Feature film
2005	Three Dollars	Tanya's Mother	Feature film
2006	Aquamarine	Grandma Maggie Brown	Feature film
2006	The Barrows	Bonnie	Short film
2009	X-Men Origins: Wolverine	Heather Hudson	Feature film
2009	The Boys Are Back	Barbara	Feature film
2010	Matching Jack	Cleo	Feature film
2010	Don't Be Afraid of the Dark	Mrs. Underhill	Feature film
2012	Last Dance	Ulah Lippmann	Feature film
2015	Is This the Real World	Gamma	Feature film
2015	Looking for Grace	Nell Norris	Feature film
2015	A Month of Sundays	Sarah	Feature film
2015	The Dressmaker	Irma Almanac	Feature film
2017	Dance Academy: The Movie	Juliet Jones	Feature film
2020	The Dry	Barb Hadler	Feature film

=== Television ===
Year	Title	Role	Type	
1963	The Hot Potato Boys	Hong Kong Anna	TV play	
1963; 1964	Consider Your Verdict	Guest roles	2 episodes	
1964	Nude With Violin	Pamela	TV play	
1964	The Sponge Room	Hilary	TV play	
1965	The Face at the Clubhouse Door		TV play	
1969–1975	Division 4	Stella Palmer	Episode: "Farewell Little Chicago"	
1969–1975	Division 4	Mother	Episode: "The Grasshoppers"	
1969–1975	Division 4	Kerri	Episode: "Rules of the Game"	
1969–1975	Division 4	Det. Sgt. Joan Palmer	2 episodes: "Cleanliness is Next to Godliness", "The Vickers Way"	
1969–1975	Division 4	Beverly Lang	Episode: "Unfit to Plead"	
1972–1975	Bellbird	Elaine Thomas	677 episodes	
1973–1975	Matlock Police	Jean Williams	Episode: "Help"	
1973–1975	Matlock Police	April Simpson	Episode: "Forget Me Not"	
1975	Homicide	Juliet	Episode: "Speaking Ill of the Dead"	
1977	Moynihan	Tanya Shaw	2 episodes	
1978	Against the Wind	Cook	Miniseries, 5 episodes	
1978–1981	Cop Shop	Catherine Maynard / Elaine Davis / Jessie Benson / Laura Hewitt / Mrs. Parker	8 episodes	
1979	Twenty Good Years	Eva Goldman	20 episodes	
1980	The Last Outlaw	Mrs. Scott	Miniseries, 4 episodes	
1980	Locusts and Wild Honey	Dr. Fletcher	3 episodes	
1981	Holiday Island	Mrs. Simpson	Episode: "Zack"	
1981–1986	Prisoner	Evelyn Randall	Season 3, 70 episodes (guest, 5 episodes)	
1981–1986	Prisoner	Alice Dodds	Season 5, 4 episodes	
1981–1986	Prisoner	Nancy McCormack	Season 8, 61 episodes	
1982	Women of the Sun	Mrs. McPhee	Miniseries, episode 2: "Maydina, the Shadow"	
1983	Under Capricorn	Milly	Miniseries, 2 episodes	
1983	Carson's Law	Miss Beasley / Miss Hilda Deniston	4 episodes	
1985	The Dunera Boys	Mum	Miniseries, 2 episodes: "1.1", "1.2"	
1985	Zoo Family	Mrs. Watson	1 episode	
1985	Winners: The Paper Boy	Reformed Sinner	TV film series, 1 episode	
1986	Sword of Honour	Jean Rogers	Miniseries, 4 episodes	
1989	The Magistrate (aka Il Magistrato)	Jean Shaw	Miniseries, 6 episodes	
1989	Edens Lost	Eve	Miniseries, 4 episodes	
1996	The Thorn Birds: The Missing Years	Fee Cleary	TV film	
1998	A Difficult Woman	Mrs. McKenzie	Miniseries, 4 episodes	
1998	Driven Crazy	Miss Baker	Episode: "Barely There"	
1998	1999	SeaChange	Tenzin Jetsunma	Episode: "Manna from Heaven"
2001	Blue Heelers	Dorothy Roberts	Episode: "Strays"	
2004	All Saints	Evelyn Ulrich	Episode: "A Place in the Heart"	
2004	Salem's Lot	Eva Prunier	Miniseries, 2 episodes: "1.1", "1.2"	
2006	The Society Murders	Margaret Wales-King	TV film	
2007	The Starter Wife	Mrs. Caldecott	Miniseries, 3 episodes	
2007	City Homicide	Hilda Conway	Episode: "The Return"	
2008–2011	Bed of Roses	Minna Franklin	26 episodes	
2010	Hawke	Ellie Hawke	TV film	
2011	Winners & Losers	Gwen Armstrong	Episode: "Happiness is a Delusion"	
2012	Conspiracy 365	Melba Snipe	Episode: "April"	
2013	Mr & Mrs Murder	Allegra Scaletta	Episode: "The Next Best Man"	
2013	Miss Fisher's Murder Mysteries	Hilly McNaster	Episode: "Dead Man's Chest"	
2015	House Husbands	Edith Benson	Episode: "4.8"	

== Theatre ==
Year	Title	Role	Notes	Ref.
1956–1957	Dead and Alive		University of Bristol	
c.1958–1960	Jacques, or, Obedience	Roberta I / Roberta II	Bristol Old Vic Theatre School	
c.1958–1960	My Own	Mrs Kepes	Bristol Old Vic Theatre School	
c.1958–1960	The Women	Second Hairdresser	Bristol Old Vic Theatre School	
1959–1960	Point in the Square	Nurse	University of Bristol	
	I Am a Camera	Sally Bowles	University of Bristol	
1960	The Bald Prima Donna	Mrs Smith	Bristol Old Vic Theatre School	
1960	The Sport of My Mad Mother	Fatty	Royal Court Theatre, London, Hampstead Theatre, London, Bristol Old Vic Theatre School	
1961	A Likely Tale	Ursula Budgeon	Queen’s Theatre, Hornchurch with Hornchurch Repertory Company	
1961	Angels in Love			
1961	Two Faces of Murder	Detective		
1961	The Hostage	Miss Gilchrist	Theatre Royal, York with York Citizens Theatre Trust	
1963	Silent Night, Lonely Night		St Martins Theatre, Melbourne	
1963	A Touch of the Poet		St Martins Theatre, Melbourne	
1963; 1965	Breakfast with Julia		St Martins Theatre, Melbourne, Arts Theatre, Adelaide	
1965	Semi-Detached		St Martins Theatre, Melbourne	
1966	The Typists and the Tiger		Emerald Hill Theatre, Melbourne	
1966	Antigone		Emerald Hill Theatre, Melbourne	
1966	Private Yuk Objects		Russell St Theatre, Melbourne with Union Theatre Repertory Company & AETT	
1967	The Platinum Cat		St Martins Theatre, Melbourne	
1969	The Rope Dancers	Margaret Hyland	St Martins Theatre, Melbourne	
1974	Under Milk Wood		Monash University, Melbourne	
1977	The Cherry Orchard	Ranyevskaia	Monash University, Melbourne with Hoopla Theatre Foundation	
1977	The Crucible	Elizabeth Proctor	Monash University, Melbourne with Hoopla Theatre Foundation	
1979	Uncle Vanya	Marina	Melbourne Athenaeum with MTC	
1980	Outside Edge	Maggie	Playbox Theatre, Melbourne	
1980	The Matchmaker	Irene Molloy	Melbourne Athenaeum with MTC	
1982	A Perfect Retreat			
1986	Dead to the World		Russell St Theatre, Melbourne with MTC	
1987	Rough Crossing	Natasha	Russell St Theatre, Melbourne with MTC	
1987	A Chorus of Disapproval	Rebecca Huntley-Pike	Playhouse, Melbourne, Canberra Theatre with MTC	
1988	Ghosts	Mrs Alving	Belvoir St Theatre, Sydney	
1988	The Doll’s House		Belvoir St Theatre, Sydney	
1988	The Browning Version / Harlequinade	Edna Selby / Millie Crocker-Harris	Australian tour	
1990	Love Letters	Melissa Gardener	Playhouse, Melbourne	
1990	Hotel Sorrento	Marge	Malthouse Theatre, Melbourne, Monash University with Playbox Theatre, Melbourne	
1990	Present Laughter	Monica Reed	Playhouse, Melbourne with MTC	
1991	Another Time	Belle Lands	Russell St Theatre, Melbourne, Marian St Theatre, Sydney with MTC	
1995	It's My Party (and I'll Die If I Want To)		Glen St Theatre, Sydney	
1995; 1997	Honour	Honour	Malthouse Theatre, Melbourne with Playbox Theatre, Wharf Theatre, Sydney	
1996	Memorial to George Fairfax		St Paul's Cathedral, Melbourne	
1997; 1999	Bauernhof		La Mama, Melbourne	
1998	The Woman in the Window	Anna Akhmatova	Fairfax Studio, Melbourne with MTC	
1998	The Piccadilly Bushman	Elaine Leggat	Malthouse Theatre, Melbourne with Playbox Theatre	
2000	Life After George	Beatrix George	Fairfax Studio, Melbourne, QPAC, Brisbane	
2000	The White Devil		Theatre Royal Sydney with STC	
2001	Salt	Laural	Malthouse Theatre, Melbourne with Playbox Theatre	
2001–2002	The Aunt’s Story		Playhouse, Melbourne, Belvoir St Theatre, Sydney, QPAC, Brisbane with MTC	
2002	The Road to Mecca		Cremorne Theatre, Brisbane with QTC	
2002	True West	Mom	Fairfax Studio, Melbourne with MTC	
2003	Humble Boy	Flora Humble	Playhouse, Melbourne	
2004	The Gin Game		Australian tour with HIT Productions	
2006	Weather		Q Theatre, Penrith	
2006	The Clean House	Ana / A Woman	Fairfax Studio, Melbourne with MTC	
2006	Festen	Else Klingenfeldt	Fairfax Studio, Melbourne with MTC	
2012	National Interest		Fairfax Studio, Melbourne with Black Swan State Theatre Company with MTC	
2013	The Crucible		Southbank Theatre, Melbourne with MTC	
2013	4,000 Miles	Vera	Red Stitch Actors Theatre	
2017	John	Genevieve Marduk	Fairfax Studio, Melbourne with MTC	

== Radio ==
Year	Title	Role	Notes	Ref.
1979	Cymbeline	Queen	ABC Radio Melbourne	
1979	Connie and Constance	Mother	ABC Radio Melbourne	
