= Travelling North (film) =

- Directed by: Carl Schultz
- Written by: David Williamson
- Produced by: Ben Gannon
- Starring: Leo McKern; Julia Blake; Graham Kennedy; Henri Szeps
- Cinematography: Julian Penney
- Edited by: Henry Dangar
- Music by: Alan John
- Distributed by: CEL Film Distribution
- Release dates: 19 June 1987 (U.S.); 23 July 1987 (Australia)
- Running time: 96 minutes
- Country: Australia
- Language: English
- Budget: AU$2.5 million
- Box office: AU$1,464,000 (Australia)

Travelling North is a 1987 Australian film directed by Carl Schultz and starring Leo McKern, Julia Blake, Graham Kennedy (in his last film role) and Henri Szeps. Based on an original 1979 play of the same name by David Williamson, it is one of Williamson's favourite movies based on his works. The act of "travelling north" as used in the title, in the context of the southern hemisphere in which the film and its original play are set, denotes transitioning from the colder, business-dominated southern regions of the Australian continent to the notionally more relaxed and warmer subtropical or tropical northern regions such as northern New South Wales (in the play) and ultimately, far north Queensland.

== Plot ==
Frank, a newly retired, sometimes bad-tempered civil engineer and his partner Frances, a good-natured divorcee some 15 years his junior, decide to live together for the first time and relocate upon his retirement from cold, busy Melbourne (home of Frances' two married daughters) to a modest but apparently paradise-like beachside home in a small town in the tropics of far north Queensland. The film follows their journey through Frank's declining health, his immoderate outbursts tempered with occasional acts of kindness and self-realization, his initial neglect of Frances' own needs, the contrast between their past big city and new small town surroundings, and their sometimes fraught, sometimes comic interactions with Freddy, their ex-serviceman neighbour and Saul, the long suffering local doctor, who eventually become their friends and providers of emotional support, to its foreshadowed, moderately peaceful, ending for Frank and cusp of another new beginning in beautiful surroundings for Frances.

== Cast ==
- Leo McKern as Frank
- Julia Blake as Frances
- Graham Kennedy as Freddy
- Henri Szeps as Saul
- Diane Craig as Sophie
- Drew Forsythe as Martin
- Roger Oakley as Stan
- Michele Fawdon as Helen

== Origin of the story ==
The David Williamson play Travelling North premiered in 1979, the year that Williamson moved from Melbourne to Sydney. Williamson says the inspiration for the play came soon after he met his second wife Kristin and she took him up to the Central Coast of New South Wales to visit her mother Hope. Hope had recently remarried an older man called Wilkie. Williamson:

There was more than a little hint of disapproval from her two daughters about the new liaison, which I used in the play, but I found them an inspiring couple. Wilkie was a ferociously intelligent man, a former electrical engineer and ex-communist with pronounced opinions on just about everything. Hope was gentler but with a wonderful quality of perception and understanding. They both impressed me and, some years later, the image of them both living in a verdant, sunlit subtropical paradise re-entered my mind and became Travelling North. In fact, by the time I wrote it, Wilkie had died. I asked Hope whether I could write the play and she trusted me and was most cooperative. She told me anecdotes about a busybody neighbour who had annoyed the hell out of Wilkie and a long-suffering doctor who had to answer Wilkie's probing questions about the quality of treatment he was delivering. These characters found their way into the story. I think Hope genuinely liked the play, but my wife Kristin and her sister were a little less enthusiastic, particularly when Frank, in the play, refers to them as "Goneril and Regan".

"This play was not to do with me, and there was no 'me' character in it," he later said. "It was a dispassionate – hopefully – observation of a journey we all must make. I tried to make it as truthful, emotionally, as I could."

In his 1980 introduction to the published version of the play, academic Philip Parsons writes that "Scenes are to be compared, connected, slotted together in a growing structure that will be complete only with the last scene of all. No form could more perfectly express the search for meaning in a life shortly to end, which is the theme of Travelling North." Elsewhere in the same introduction, Parsons writes: "Travelling north, Frances needs to escape from her own sense of guilt. Frank, untroubled by guilt, feels he needs to get away from the pressure of people to examine his life for its meaning. They both have a lot to do."

The film was not made until eight years later, with Williamson adapting his own play into a script.

== Production ==
Ben Gannon optioned film rights to the play and hired Leo McKern to play the lead. It was intended that Michael Blakemore direct but after casting was completed he dropped out and was replaced by Carl Schultz. Warren Mitchell was originally cast as the local doctor but was replaced by Henri Szeps, who transitioned his part from playing the same role in the original Sydney production of the stage play.

The film was shot in Port Douglas, Queensland, in July and August 1986. Much of the superb atmosphere of the film was created by the choice of music - the heart-rending slow movement from Wolfgang Amadeus Mozart's String Quintet No. 4 - which was used repeatedly throughout.

The northern location, and the tone of the ending for Frances were changed in the eight years between the release of the play and the film. In the play, the couple set up home not in tropical Queensland but in the sub-tropics at Tweed Heads in northern New South Wales, local characters such as Freddy and Saul also reside there, and it is made clear that upon Frank's death, Frances intends to continue her journey of self-realization by "travelling north" further. In the film, Frank and Frances "travel north" together all the way to tropical Queensland's Port Douglas at the outset (virtually as far as the road goes in that direction, and some 1,600 kilometers/1,000 miles further north than Tweed Heads in reality) and the northern-located action is all set there. In both cases, Frank in his posthumously-opened letter suggests that Frances would be better off returning to her family in Melbourne than staying around and getting entangled with further old persons ("old crocks", a veiled reference to Freddy and/or Saul) locally. In the film, the last that the viewer sees of Frances is in the garden of the far north Queensland home that she and Frank have created together, smiling, as if to convey the impression that she may already have found her desired destination.

== Critical reception ==
Critical reviews of the movie were largely positive, with one or two notable exceptions. On www.rogerebert.com, Roger Ebert gave the movie 3.5 stars, stating:

Nothing much really happens in "Traveling North," in the sense of large events to move the plot ahead... [But] This is a film of everyday life, and all the more moving because of that. It’s not a film of sentiment, but a film of love: It loves old Frank just as he is, but without forgiving him a single wart. And it loves Frances, too, for her loyalty but also because she sees the situation clearly and does not deceive herself.

On the other hand, Hal Hinson, in The Washington Post, wrote:

What remains of the film is taken up with a catalogue of Frank's heart problems, his arguments with his doctor (Henri Szeps), and his self-centered despotism toward Frances, who suffers through all with her mouth puckered up like a disapproving schoolmarm. ... How much you like "Travelling North" may depend on how you respond to crusty old codgers who waddle around in their shorts with their ample guts hanging over their waistbands, bellowing out their general disdain for life and the living to all within earshot. Me? I'd rather eat dirt.

Robert Horton, on "What a Feeling", wrote:

Now the exemplary British character actor, Leo McKern, has found a crowning role in a new Australian film. Travelling North. ... Playwright David Williamson has not created a great deal in the way of dramatic action (and the woman remains too much of an enigma), but he has created a golden opportunity for a skillful actor. Under the direction of Carl Schultz (Careful, He Might Hear You), McKern blusters and soars in the meaty role, which allows him to spew a string of well-chosen words of venom in one scene and delicately wave his conducting baton to a radio broadcast of Mozart in another. McKern uses every ounce of his considerable flesh and every roll of his masterful voice to carry off the part. The best thing about McKern's performance is that he genuinely communicates the seasoning of years of experience. You can't deny the sense of years lived when, anticipating his death, he insists that his companion break out a bottle of champagne upon his passing: "For all my faults, I’m damn well worth a magnum!"

On the Urban CineFile, reviewer Andrew L. Urban wrote:

David Williamson's effortlessly crafted screenplay in the hands of astute director Carl Schultz and a terrific cast makes Travelling North a timeless pleasure. Leo McKern is a likeably irritating bully whose redemption is his insight into his bad behaviour for so many years to so many who loved him. Julia Blake glows as his younger lady friend, and she too has family baggage. The symbolism of escaping one's past is subtly engaging, while the surrounding characters are used to reveal secrets and truths. ... They all come to life in this genuine labour of love. It's not a film with plot points and storylines; it's about the wounds and regrets of lives whose outer surfaces are nothing like their inner depths. That's why it stands the test of time: it's the truth.

On the Internet Movie Database (IMDb), the film is given an overall rating of 6.9/10 based on 297 user ratings (as at July 2020).

== Awards ==
At the AFI Awards the film won the categories Best Actor in a Lead Role (Leo McKern) and Best Adapted Screenplay (David Williamson). Julia Blake was nominated. Montréal World Film Festival awarded the Best Actor award to Leo McKern.

== Box office ==
Travelling North grossed $1,464,000 at the box office in Australia, which is equivalent to $2,942,640 in 2009 dollars.

== See also ==
- Cinema of Australia
