= Terry Norris (actor) =

Australian actor and politician (1930–2023)

- Norris in Cop Shop

Member of the Victorian Legislative Assembly for Dandenong
- In office 2 March 1985 – 2 October 1992
- Preceded by: Rob Jolly
- Succeeded by: John Pandazopoulos

Member of the Victorian Legislative Assembly for Noble Park
- In office 3 April 1982 – 1 March 1985
- Preceded by: Peter Collins
- Succeeded by: District abolished

Personal details
- Born: Terence Richard Norris; 9 June 1930 Richmond, Victoria, Australia
- Died: 20 March 2023 (aged 92) Geelong, Victoria, Australia
- Party: Labor Party
- Spouse: Julia Blake (m. 1962)
- Children: 3
- Occupation: Actor; politician

Terence Richard Norris (9 June 1930 – 20 March 2023) was an Australian stage, radio, television and film actor, and politician.

As an actor, he starred in television shows such as Bellbird and Cop Shop, and in films such as Romulus, My Father, The Chronicles of Narnia: The Voyage of the Dawn Treader and Paper Planes.

Norris interrupted his show business career for ten years, serving in state politics as a Labor Party MP in the Victorian Legislative Assembly.

== Early life ==
Norris was born in Richmond, a suburb of Melbourne. His father was a boilermaker and he intended on following in his footsteps, before he became interested in acting.

After Norris left school at 15, he saw a stage production of the musical Rose-Marie at His Majesty's Theatre in Melbourne, inspiring him to contact a number of Melbourne theatre managers, requesting work. This resulted in a job at the Tivoli Theatre, as a wardrobe boy. After 12 months, he was promoted to stage assistant and eventually landed walk-on roles.

== Acting career ==
=== Theatre ===
At the age of 21, Norris left for the UK, where he joined a repertory company in York in the late 1950s, performing leading roles, in everything from Shakespeare to farce. He also appeared in repertory theatre in Bradford and Huddersfield, among other places. In 1961, he met wife-to-be Julia Blake, a member of the company’s sister troupe, and they worked together in productions of Angels in Love and Two Faces of Murder.

Norris returned to Australia in 1963, performing in numerous theatre roles and as a playwright. While filming television series Bellbird, he also performed in evening stage shows at Tikki & John’s Theatre Restaurant, Brian Hannan’s Squizzy’s and the Grotto Gaslight Music Hall. He also appeared in a host of plays at Melbourne’s St Martins Theatre.

Norris toured Australia in It's My Party (and I’ll Die if I Want To) and The Gin Game, together with Blake. They also co-starred in Love Letters and The Piccadilly Bushman. His later stage credits (when he was in his 70s), included Melbourne Theatre Company productions of Death of a Salesman, Humble Boy, Boy Gets Girl and Cat on a Hot Tin Roof.

Norris also wrote the play Allison's Rub, which was performed at the Courthouse Theatre for the 1997 Melbourne Comedy Festival.

=== Television ===
In the late 1950s and early 1960s, Norris had minor roles on television in the UK, including the musical-comedy series Sunshine Street and BBC One sitcom The Eggheads.

Back in Australia, Norris had early roles in The Shifting Heart, Nude with Violin and A Man for All Seasons and played the lead role in Luther to critical acclaim. He played the crown prosecutor in courtroom drama Consider Your Verdict, appeared in early episodes of Homicide and had a guest role in the sitcom Barley Charlie. He was in a television play version of Othello and took on further roles in television plays in Australian Playhouse. He also had early roles in Hunter and Dynasty.

Norris also appeared as a variety show guest performer on Time for Terry and Saturday Night Live, was a guest host on In Melbourne Tonight, and made appearances on quiz shows, talk shows and in television commercials.

Norris became best known for his two long-running television soap opera roles. The first of these was Bellbird, in which he played local town motor mechanic Joe Turner, from 1969 until 1977. Norris lead a campaign to save the series from a timeslot and format change, a move which lead to his contract not being renewed and the retirement of his character from the show.

While working on Bellbird, Norris undertook guest roles in Bobby Dazzler, The Last of the Australians, Division 4 and Power Without Glory (based on the novel of the same name). He also appeared in the television series Matlock Police, Homicide, Division 4, Ryan and Consider Your Verdict.

Norris's other best-known role was as Senior Sergeant Eric O'Reilly in police series Cop Shop, which he began in December 1977, for five years. His portrayal won him a Silver Logie for Best Supporting Actor at the Logie Awards in 1980. Norris left Cop Shop in 1982, to pursue a career in state politics. His character was replaced by Senior Sergeant Reg Wallis, played by Alwyn Kurts. Despite this, the show was axed the following year.

Following his retirement from politics in 1992, Norris returned to acting in the mid-1990s, appearing in long-running police procedural series Blue Heelers, miniseries Changi, Stingers, Something in the Air, City Homicide, Killing Time, Miss Fisher’s Murder Mysteries, The Damnation of Harvey McHugh. Marshall Law and Bloom. He also had a role in children's series Horace and Tina.

Norris also had roles in 2006 true crime television film The Society Murders and 2010 biographical television film Hawke. The latter, chronicled the life of former Australian Prime Minister Bob Hawke, Norris portraying Hawke’s father, Clem. He had a recurring role in the Jack Irish television movies and series alongside Guy Pearce, playing one of the barflies at the Prince of Prussia pub, his final episode being in 2021. Norris made a guest appearance in the 2018 television sequel to 1992 Russell Crowe film Romper Stomper. From 2019 to 2020, he featured in two seasons of Bloom, playing the regular character of Herb Webb.

=== Film ===
Early film roles for Norris included 1971 comedy Stork, (based on the David Williamson play of the same name) opposite Bruce Spence and Jacki Weaver and 1975 comedy The Great MacArthy with John Jarratt.

After his return to acting, Norris appeared in 1994 romantic comedy Lucky Break (aka Paperbook Romance) with Anthony LaPaglia, and played local fire chief, Ted in 1997 comedy drama Road to Nhill. He then starred alongside his wife Julia Blake, as John in 2000 film Innocence. The latter role saw him win a Film Critics Circle award and receive an AFI nomination for Best Supporting Actor.

Further roles included 2005 film Three Dollars with David Wenham and Frances O'Connor, 2006 thriller Irresistible with Susan Sarandon, 2007 period drama Romulus, My Father alongside Eric Bana and 2010 children's fantasy film The Chronicles of Narnia: The Voyage of the Dawn Treader.

Norris's son-in-law Robert Connolly, directed him in 2015 children's film Paper Planes opposite Sam Worthington. The same year, he was in Looking for Grace with Richard Roxburgh and Radha Mitchell, The Dressmaker alongside Kate Winslet and Liam Hemsworth, and Force of Destiny, once more with Wenham.

In 2018, he appeared in Peter Jackson’s post-apocalyptic steampunk film Mortal Engines, filmed in New Zealand. The following year, he had a role in Judy and Punch, alongside Mia Wasikowska and Damon Herriman, in which he played the part of Scaramouche. He continued acting into his early 90s, his final screen role being 2022 action-adventure fantasy film The King's Daughter (aka The Sun and the Moon) with William Hurt, Pierce Brosnan and Rachel Griffiths.

=== Radio ===
Norris also worked in radio, including regular schools broadcasts and two years with ABC’s The Village Glee Club.

In 2007, he played Farley Hamilton in an ABC radio adaptation of the Australian classic, Inheritance.

=== Other ===
In 2018, together with actress wife Julia Blake, Norris was the recipient of the Equity Lifetime Achievement Award at the Equity Ensemble Awards.

== Political career ==
=== Entry to politics ===
Norris appeared in the successful 1972 Gough Whitlam / ALP It's Time TV commercial campaign, singing the campaign jingle of the same name alongside Jack Thompson, Jacki Weaver, Barry Crocker and Bert Newton, Tony Barber and Graham Kennedy, among other celebrities.

In 1982, Norris left Cop Shop, to pursue a career in state politics. Having been a member of the Australian Labor Party for the preceding 16 years, Norris sought and gained preselection to contest the seat of Noble Park as an ALP candidate at the 1982 Victorian state election. Only needing a swing of just over 1% to gain the seat from sitting member Peter Collins, Norris was elected to the Victorian Legislative Assembly with a swing of over 4%.

He held the seat until the electorate was abolished in 1985 in a redistribution. He then successfully stood for election in the seat of Dandenong at the 1985 election, succeeding his colleague Rob Jolly who was elected to the newly created seat of Doveton.

=== Views ===
Speaking during a grievance debate in 1984, Norris suggested there should be private screenings of pornographic films for Victorian members of parliament to assist them in debates about censorship laws and the classification of movies with objectionable content, similar to what had been arranged for their New South Wales counterparts.

Following the release of a ministerial committee report on the subject of underage drinking in 1986, Norris proposed the legal drinking age in Australia be increased to the age of 20, citing the positive effects of similar laws in the United States and Sweden. He also said the issue of underage drinking was being exacerbated by the growing trend of alcohol advertising deliberately being targeted to a young demographic.

Throughout his parliamentary career, Norris' television experience was advantageous when speaking out on a number of issues relating to the media. In 1985, he accused a Network 10 reporter of having a conflict of interest, claiming he had been working as a media advisor for the Mountain Cattlemen's Association while he was also working as a Ten News reporter during the 1985 Nunawading Province state by-election. Norris questioned the reporter's ethical standards while alleging he had links to the Liberal Party which needed to be investigated. The reporter denied working as a media advisor for the association.

In 1987, Norris was part of a delegation which also included Sheila Florence, Gil Tucker, Terry Donovan and Maggie Kirkpatrick who met with premier John Cain after a mass sacking of 78 employees from HSV-7. The delegation told Cain that the end of television production in Melbourne would mean that there would no longer be training opportunities for actors, technicians, and production staff.

Norris spearheaded the "Make It Australian" campaign in 1988, lobbying against de-regulation of the television industry and campaigning for the local drama quota for the networks to be increased from 104 to 365 hours per year as well as more regional production, children's drama and a guaranteed independence of the Australian Broadcasting Tribunal. He gained the support of Hector Crawford, Rupert Hamer and David Williamson.

=== Overseas trip controversy ===
Arguably Norris' most controversial political endeavour came in July 1992, just before his retirement. When Norris, Legislative Assembly speaker Ken Coghill, and Legislative Council president, Alan Hunt, went on a lengthy overseas bicameral and bipartisan goodwill visit to Asia with their wives, debate ensued. Jeff Kennett and Graeme Weideman were among the critics of the 18-day trip. It was questioned why Norris and Hunt were selected to go on such a journey just before their respective retirements, as was the use of public funds for the trip. Confusion arose about who authorised the expenditure when it was discovered additional money had been allocated for the trip under a parliamentary budget. To clarify what had happened, premier Joan Kirner called a special media conference where she blamed a senior bureaucrat for mistakenly authorising extra public funds for the trip. In an editorial, The Age newspaper also questioned whether such a trip could be justified given the state was in recession and the Victorian Government in deficit. The newspaper endorsed Kennett's views that the trip was inappropriate. Norris denied the trip had been a "junket" and condemned the criticism of the trip, becoming concerned about the potential damage to Asia-Pacific relations, stating: "If anything that's happened as a result of the speculation made about our trip, (should) damage that relationship, be it on the heads of the mental midgets who have done the bad-mouthing."

=== Retirement from politics ===
After ten years in the Victorian Legislative Assembly, during which time he rose to become Deputy Speaker, Norris retired from politics in 1992 and was succeeded as the Member of Dandenong by John Pandazopoulos.

== Personal life ==
Norris married English-born Australian actress Julia Blake in 1962. They met in Yorkshire, appearing together in repertory theatre. The couple married between a matinee and evening performance, before spending their honeymoon in Scarborough, North Yorkshire, learning lines for their next play together.

Norris and Blake had three children – Dominic, Jane and Sarah. Their daughters followed them into acting, and their son-in-law Robert Connolly is a director, having worked on miniseries The Slap and Barracuda, and 2009 film Balibo. By 2018, Norris also had four grandchildren.

== Death ==
Norris died on 20 March 2023 after a short illness, at the age of 92.

== Awards and nominations ==
| Year | Work | Award | Honour | Result | Ref. |
|---|---|---|---|---|---|
| 1980 | Cop Shop | Logie Awards | Best Supporting Actor in a Series | Won | |
| 2001 | Innocence | Film Critics Circle of Australia | Best Supporting Actor Male | Won | |
| 2001 | Innocence | Australian Film Institute Awards | Best Actor in a Supporting Role | Nominated | |
| 2018 | Terry Norris (with Julia Blake) | Equity Ensemble Awards | Lifetime Achievement Award | Honoured | |

== Filmography ==
=== Film ===
| Year | Title | Role | Type |
|---|---|---|---|
| 1968 | Birth of a Monster | Narrator | Documentary short |
| 1971 | Stork | Anna's Father | Feature film |
| 1973 | The Spiders | Old Man | Short film |
| 1975 | The Great Macarthy | Vera's Dad | Feature film |
| 1975 | On the Track of Unknown Animals | Narrator | Documentary short |
| 1977 | High Rolling in a Hot Corvette | Farmer | Feature film |
| 1994 | Paperbook Romance (aka Lucky Break) | Judge | Feature film |
| 1997 | Road to Nhill | Ted | Feature film |
| 1998 | Deathbed of an Undertaker | Bert | Short film |
| 1998 | Mrs Craddock's Complaint | Mr Craddock | Short film |
| 2000 | Innocence | John | Feature film |
| 2001 | Hostage to Fate | Mr Boyle | |
| 2001 | Bowl Me Over | Bob | Short film |
| 2004 | Human Touch | Ouspensky | Feature film |
| 2005 | Three Dollars | Alfred Price | Feature film |
| 2006 | Irresistible | Magistrate | Feature film |
| 2006 | The Barrows | Mr. Barrow | Short film |
| 2007 | Romulus, My Father | Tom Lillie | Feature film |
| 2008 | Salvation | Gallery Guide | Feature film |
| 2008 | Zyco Rock | Granpa | |
| 2010 | The Chronicles of Narnia: The Voyage of the Dawn Treader | Lord Bern | Feature film |
| 2011 | On Borrowed Time | Self | Documentary film |
| 2014 | Paper Planes | George 'Grandpa' Webber | Feature film |
| 2015 | Force of Destiny | Derek | Feature film |
| 2015 | Looking for Grace | Tom Norris | Feature film |
| 2015 | The Dressmaker | Septimus Crescent | Feature film |
| 2018 | Dying for a Laugh | Ken | Short film |
| 2018 | Mortal Engines | Professor Arkengarth | Feature film |
| 2019 | Judy and Punch | Scaramouche | Feature film |
| 2022 | The King's Daughter | Great Chamberlain | Feature film |

=== Television ===
| Year | Title | Role | Type |
|---|---|---|---|
| 1961 | The Eggheads | | 7 episodes |
| 1963 | A Man for All Seasons | King Henry VIII | TV play |
| 1963–1964 | Consider Your Verdict | Crown Prosecutor | 8 episodes |
| 1964 | Nude with Violin | Sebastien Lacreole | TV play |
| 1964 | The Sponge Room | Colin | TV play |
| 1964 | Barley Charlie | Herb | 1 episode |
| 1964 | Corruption in the Palace of Justice | Judge Cust | TV play |
| 1964 | Othello | Rodrigo | TV play |
| 1964 | The Physicists | Beutler | TV play |
| 1964 | Six Characters in Search of an Author | Letho, the producer | TV play |
| 1964 | Luther | Martin Luther | TV play |
| 1964–1972 | Homicide | Terence Garrick / Chris Lodge / Sean Rogan / Frank Lord / Vance Pritchard / Vince / Dr. Pringle / Des Bishop / John Jackson / Noel Franklin, Herb Thomas / Lennie Walker | 27 episodes |
| 1965 | Romanoff and Juliet | Mauve Monk, the spy | TV play |
| 1965 | The Winds of Green Monday | Mate Roberts | TV play |
| 1966 | Topaze | Tamise | TV play |
| 1966 | Australian Playhouse | Fuller | TV play: "Ticket to Nowhere" |
| 1967–1977 | Bellbird | Joe Turner | Regular role |
| 1968 | The Proposal and the Bear | Chubukov / Smirnov | TV play |
| 1968 | The Shifting Heart | Donny | TV play |
| 1968 | A Guy Called Athol | | Variety series |
| 1968–1969 | Hunter | Delaney / Grant / Peter Kramer | 3 episodes |
| 1969 | Dynasty | Jim Richards | TV play |
| 1969–1975 | Division 4 | Des Phillips / Joe Swithen / Les Jackson / Fred | 4 episodes |
| 1972 | I'm Damned if I Know | | TV play |
| 1972–1975 | Matlock Police | Herbie Marsh / Bill Thomas / Clive Atkinson / Sam Rigby / Frank Simpson | 5 episodes |
| 1973 | Ryan | Fruit picker | 1 episode |
| 1975–1976 | The Last of the Australians | Blue Dawson | 9 episodes |
| 1976 | Solo One | Burgess | 1 episode |
| 1976 | Power Without Glory | Ron Lassiter | 2 episodes |
| 1977 | Young Ramsay | 'Old Wombat' Thompson | 1 episode |
| 1977–1978 | Bobby Dazzler | Uncle Oz | 8 episodes |
| 1977–1984 | Cop Shop | Senior Sgt. Eric O'Reilly | Regular role |
| 1994 | The Damnation of Harvey McHugh | Judge Brown | 1 episode |
| 1996; 1999 | Blue Heelers | Max Arnold | 2 episodes |
| 1998 | Driven Crazy | Gentleman Bowler #1 | 1 episode |
| 1999 | Noah's Ark | High Priest | Miniseries, 2 episodes |
| 1999 | Pig's Breakfast | | |
| 2000 | Waiting at the Royal | Diana's Father | TV movie |
| 2001 | Something in the Air | Fred | 5 episodes |
| 2001 | Horace and Tina | Ern Watson | 6 episodes |
| 2001 | Changi | Older Bill Dwyer | Miniseries, 2 episodes |
| 2002 | Marshall Law | Mr. Grand | 1 episode |
| 2002 | Stingers | Arthur Gascon | 1 episode |
| 2003 | CrashBurn | Charlie | 1 episode |
| 2006 | The Society Murders | Paul King | TV movie |
| 2008 | Valentine's Day | Stump Woods | TV movie |
| 2010 | Hawke | Clem Hawke | TV movie |
| 2010 | City Homicide | Bill Lalor | 1 episode |
| 2011 | Killing Time | Rod Fraser | 6 episodes |
| 2012 | Miss Fisher's Murder Mysteries | Franklin D. Weston | 1 episode |
| 2012 | Jack Irish: Black Tide | Eric Tanner | TV movie |
| 2012 | Jack Irish: Bad Debts | Eric Tanner | TV movie |
| 2014 | Jack Irish: Dead Point | Eric Tanner | TV movie |
| 2016–2021 | Jack Irish | Eric Tanner | 15 episodes |
| 2018 | Romper Stomper | Arty | 1 episode |
| 2019–2020 | Bloom | Herb Webb | 10 episodes |

== Theatre ==
| Year | Title | Role | Type |
|---|---|---|---|
| 1961 | Angels in Love | | |
| 1961 | Two Faces of Murder | Detective | |
| 1961 | The Hostage | Pat | Theatre Royal, York with York Citizens Theatre Trust |
| 1963 | A Touch of the Poet | | St Martins Theatre, Melbourne |
| 1963; 1965 | Breakfast with Julia | | St Martins Theatre, Melbourne, Arts Theatre, Adelaide |
| 1964 | Rashomon | | St Martins Theatre, Melbourne |
| 1964 | Antigone | Creon | Emerald Hill Theatre, Melbourne |
| 1964 | All in Good Time | Ezra | St Martins Theatre, Melbourne |
| 1964 | Angels in Love or The Perils of Purity | | St Martins Theatre, Melbourne |
| 1965 | Semi-Detached | | St Martins Theatre, Melbourne |
| 1966 | Lady Audley's Secret | | St Martins Theatre, Melbourne |
| 1966 | The Thin Line | | Emerald Hill Theatre, Melbourne with Union Theatre Repertory Company |
| 1974 | Housey | | Pram Factory, Melbourne with APG |
| 1974 | Bigotry V.C. | | Pram Factory, Melbourne with APG |
| 1974 | Puckoon | | Monash University, Melbourne with Players' Caravan |
| 1990 | Love Letters | Andrew Makepeace III | Playhouse, Melbourne with Victorian Arts Centre |
| 1995 | It's My Party (and I'll Die If I Want To) | | Glen St Theatre, Sydney |
| 1997 | Alison's Rub | Playwright | Carlton Courthouse, Melbourne with La Mama |
| 1998 | The Piccadilly Bushman | Lee Leggat | Merlyn Theatre, Melbourne with Playbox Theatre |
| 1999 | The Resistible Rise of Arturo Ui | Dogsborough / various | Playhouse, Melbourne with MTC |
| 2000 | Death of a Salesman | Uncle Ben | Fairfax Studio, Melbourne with MTC |
| 2001 | The Duchess of Malfi | Castruccio | Fairfax Studio, Melbourne with MTC |
| 2003 | Humble Boy | Jim the Gardener | Playhouse, Melbourne with MTC |
| 2004 | The Gin Game | Weller | Australian tour with HIT Productions |
| 2005 | Boy Gets Girl | Les Kennkat | Fairfax Studio, Melbourne with MTC |
| 2006 | Weather | | Q Theatre, Penrith |
| 2008 | Cat on a Hot Tin Roof | Dr Baugh | Playhouse, Melbourne with MTC |
| 2008 | Gala | | Southbank Theatre, Melbourne with MTC |
| 2010 | Do Not Go Gentle | Evans | Fortyfivedownstairs, Melbourne |

== Radio ==
| Year | Title | Role | Ref. |
|---|---|---|---|
| | The Village Glee Club | | |
| 1960s | Forests of the Night | Maung Zan | |
| | The Cruise of the Three Brothers | Peter Bowring | |
| 2002 | Scenes from Sheep Country | | |
| 2007 | Inheritance | Farley Hamilton | |
| 2008 | The Elephant's Ark | | |

Parliament of Victoria
| Preceded by Peter Collins | Member for Noble Park; 1982–1985 | District abolished |
| Preceded by Rob Jolly | Member for Dandenong; 1985–1992 | Succeeded by John Pandazopoulos |
