= Innocence (2000 film) =

- DVD cover
- Directed by: Paul Cox
- Written by: Paul Cox
- Produced by: Paul Cox; Mark Patterson
- Starring: Charles Tingwell; Julia Blake
- Edited by: Simon Whtington
- Music by: Paul Grabowsky
- Production companies: Cinemavault Releasing; Fireworks Entertainment; Showtime Movie Channels; Strand/New Oz Productions; Planeta 2010
- Distributed by: Metro-Goldwyn-Mayer (USA theatrical); Columbia TriStar Home Entertainment (USA home media); Planeta 2010 (through Paramount Pictures) (Spain)
- Release date: 2000
- Running time: 96 minutes
- Country: Australia
- Language: English
- Box office: A$1.1 million

Innocence is a 2000 Australian film directed by Paul Cox. The film deals with the story of two separated lovers who meet again accidentally after decades and fall in love again.

== Cast ==
- Julia Blake as Claire
- Bud Tingwell as Andreas Borg
- Kristine Van Pellicom as Young Claire
- Kenny Aernouts as Young Andreas
- Terry Norris as John
- Marta Dusseldorp as Monique
- Robert Menzies as David
- Chris Haywood as Minister
- Norman Kaye as Gerald
- Joey Kennedy as Sally
- Liz Windsor as Maudie

== Reception ==
The film was lauded by critics and was one of Cox's most successful films commercially.

== Accolades ==
In 2000 it won the Jury Grand Prix, Best feature film, at the Rencontres internationales du cinéma des Antipodes (Antipodean Film Festival).

It also won the Grand Prix des Amériques.

== See also ==
- Cinema of Australia
