= The Seventh Sign =

1988 film by Carl Schultz

- Theatrical release poster
- Directed by: Carl Schultz
- Written by: Clifford Green; Ellen Green
- Produced by: Ted Field; Robert W. Cort
- Starring: Demi Moore; Michael Biehn; Peter Friedman; Jürgen Prochnow
- Cinematography: Juan Ruiz Anchía
- Edited by: Caroline Biggerstaff
- Music by: Jack Nitzsche
- Production companies: Interscope Communications; ML Delphi Premier Productions
- Distributed by: Tri-Star Pictures
- Release date: April 1, 1988
- Running time: 97 minutes
- Country: United States
- Language: English
- Box office: $18.8 million (United States)

The Seventh Sign is a 1988 American apocalyptic drama horror film written by Clifford and Ellen Green and directed by Carl Schultz. The film stars Demi Moore, Michael Biehn, Jürgen Prochnow and Peter Friedman. The title and plot reference the seven seals described in the Book of Revelation, the final book of the New Testament of the Bible. The film was released on April 1, 1988, by Columbia Pictures Entertainment under the Tri-Star Pictures label, received mixed reviews and grossed $18.8 million at the box office domestically.

== Plot ==
Around the world, unusual phenomena are occurring that bear resemblance to signs of the Biblical apocalypse; these include a mass death of sea life in Haiti and a devastating freeze in the Middle East, and at each of these locations, a mysterious traveler opens a sealed envelope just prior to the event taking place. The Vatican tasks Father Lucci with investigating these events, though Lucci advises that they are all either hoaxes or have scientific explanations.

Concurrently, Abby Quinn, a pregnant woman living in California, prepares for the birth of her child. Her husband, Russell, is a defense lawyer representing Jimmy Szaragosa, a man with Down syndrome who is on trial for murdering his incestuous parents and claiming he did so by order of God. Jimmy is convicted of the crime and sentenced to death.

For additional income, Abby and Russell rent a room to the mysterious traveler, who identifies himself as David Bannon. He first charms them with stories of the Hebrew myth of the Guf (or Guph), from whence all souls come to earth, and how, when a sparrow sings its song, it is the only living animal that can see the soul coming from the Guf. Soon after, Abby begins to have terrible nightmares of a man closely resembling David being struck down by a Roman soldier, who then asks, "will you die for him?" of her. In addition, Abby physically reacts inexplicably.

Abby also learns of the apocalyptic signs that have occurred, and combined with her nightmares and David's suspicious behavior, she begins to worry that something terrible is taking place. She snoops through David's papers and discovers an ancient note that leads her to believe that he intends to harm her child. When Abby confronts David about this, he tells her that God's grace is empty and that soon, no souls will remain to be given to newborn babies. Abby panics and stabs David, only for him to shrug off the injury and claim that he "cannot die again." To add to Abby's shock and horror, the stab wound David sustains bursts with light rather than blood.

It becomes apparent that David is actually the Second Coming of Jesus Christ. Abby's nightmares are visions of his original crucifixion, and she is the reincarnation of Seraphia, the woman who offered Jesus water only to be turned away by Cartaphilus, Pilate's porter who struck Jesus.

The signs of the apocalypse continue to unfold, eventually culminating in a giant storm. Abby connects with Avi, a rabbinical student who helps her understand the events. Father Lucci, who has come to California as part of his investigation, finds her and hears her concerns. However, while meeting with Lucci, Abby spots a ring on his finger identical to the one Cartaphilus wore and learns that Lucci is Cartaphilus himself, cursed to wander the Earth until Christ's return to judge humanity. He intends to allow the apocalypse to take place so that his curse will finally be broken.

Abby flees from Lucci with Avi's help, and together they find a Bible to learn what will happen next. They discover that the sixth sign will be a solar eclipse that will take place the next day, meaning that the fifth sign — the tortured death of a martyr for God's cause — must take place very soon. Abby realizes that clemency has been denied to Jimmy and his execution will be the fifth sign. In a panic, she drives to the prison to stop the execution; however, Lucci has already infiltrated the prison. As Abby approaches, Lucci kills Jimmy and wounds Abby, and is taken away by the guards.

The eclipse begins along with a catastrophic earthquake. Despondent over her failure to save Jimmy and the rest of humanity, Abby goes into labor and is rushed through the disaster to a nearby hospital. Despite the best efforts of Russell and the doctors to help her, the child's heart stops beating as Abby gives birth, thus fulfilling the seventh and final sign, the birth of the soulless child. However, Abby has another vision of her past as Seraphia and remembers Cartaphilus' question. Finally finding true hope, Abby answers the question in the affirmative—"I will die for him"—and reaches out to her child, who revives and holds her finger. Her soul is thus transferred to the child, saving him at the cost of her own life. This act of faith ends the apocalypse; Jesus appears in the hospital and tells Russell that Abby's sacrifice has refilled the Hall of Souls, ensuring humanity's continued survival. He also tells Avi to record this for future generations.

== Cast ==
- Demi Moore as Abby Quinn
- Michael Biehn as Russell Quinn
- Jürgen Prochnow as The Boarder / David Bannon
- Peter Friedman as Father Lucci / Cartaphilus
- Manny Jacobs as Avi
- John Taylor as Jimmy Szaragosa
- Akosua Busia as Penny Washburn
- Lee Garlington as Dr. Margaret Inness
- John Heard as Reverend
- Richard Devon as Second Cardinal
- Ian Buchanan as Mr. Huberty
- Hugo Stanger as Old Priest

== Production ==
Director Carl Schultz said what appealed to him about working on the film was the prospect of working with an international cast such as Demi Moore in her first adult role. Schultz said he based his approach to the film off of Val Lewton's films where he kept the usage of optical effects to a minimum as he felt a more minimalist method that favored suggestion would play better to the audience.

=== Effects ===
Dream Quest Images provided the visual effects which were designed by Eric Brevig with Michael L. Fink serving as visual effects supervisor. An effects sequence cut from the final film involved a bridge of light between Abby's house and David's garage apartment being summoned by David as a test of Abby's faith with Abby's foot falling through the bridge while her dog, Ace, would run across it without incident. The sequence was cut as it was felt it undercut the drama when Abby stabs David and test audiences started giggling when the dog ran across the bridge.

== Release and reception ==
The film was released theatrically in the United States by TriStar Pictures on April 1, 1988. It grossed $18,875,011 at the US box office. It received mixed reviews from critics, and holds a 15% rating on Rotten Tomatoes based on 20 reviews. In his two-star review, Roger Ebert stated: "After the sheer anarchy unleashed upon Hollywood by the slice-and-dice movies, it’s actually comforting to know that these characters play by the rules. They believe in good and evil, and they act as if individual human beings can have an influence on the outcome of events." Michael Wilmington in a review for the Los Angeles Times praised the visuals used in the film, calling them "extraordinary"; however, he felt that the material was lacking and categorized the story as a "New Age variation on Rosemary's Baby".

== Home media ==
The film was released on DVD in the United States by Sony Pictures Home Entertainment in 1998. Scream Factory released the film on Blu-ray on September 11, 2018, featuring new interviews with actors Michael Biehn, Peter Friedman and John Taylor, screenwriters Clifford and Ellen Green and director Carl Schultz, as well as two television spots.

== See also ==
- Plagues of Egypt
- The Abominable Dr. Phibes
- The Reaping
- List of films featuring eclipses
