= Guf =

Hebrew word meaning "body"; in Jewish mysticism, the Treasury of Souls

Guf (Hebrew: גּוּף, also transliterated Guph or Gup) is a Hebrew word, meaning "body". In Jewish mysticism the Chamber of Guf, also called the Otzar (הָאוֹצָר, "treasury"), is the Treasury of Souls, located in the Seventh Heaven.

== Tree of Souls ==
According to Jewish mythology, in the Garden of Eden there is a Tree of life, or the "Tree of Souls", that blossoms and produces new souls, which fall into the Guf, the "Treasury of Souls". Gabriel reaches into the treasury and takes out the first soul that comes into his hand. Then Lailah, the Angel of Conception, watches over the embryo until it is born.

According to Rabbi Isaac Luria, the trees are resting places for souls; sparrows can see the soul's descent, explaining their joyous chirping. The Tree of Souls produces all the souls that have ever existed, or will ever exist. When the last soul descends, the world will come to an end. According to the Talmud, Yevamot 62a, the Messiah will not come until the Guf is emptied of all its souls. In keeping with other Jewish legends that envision souls as bird-like, the Guf is sometimes described as a columbarium, or birdhouse. The mystic significance of the Guf is that each person is important and has a unique role that only they, with their unique soul, can fulfill. Even a newborn baby brings the Messiah closer simply by being born.

The peculiar idiom of describing the treasury of souls as a "body" may be connected to the mythic tradition of Adam Kadmon, the primordial man. Adam Kadmon, God's "original intention" for humanity, was a supernal being, androgynous and macro-cosmic (co-equal in size with the universe). When this Adam sinned, humanity was demoted to the flesh and blood, bifurcated and mortal creatures we are now. According to Kabbalah, every human soul is just a fragment (or fragments) cycling out of the great "world-soul" of Adam Kadmon. Hence, every human soul comes from the guf [of Adam Kadmon].

== See also ==
- Pre-existence
- Traducianism
- The Seventh Sign: The plot of the 1988 film was based on the Guf mythology. The protagonist's baby is due on February 29, the date when the last soul will leave the Guf.
- Well of Souls

== Bibliography ==
- Dennis, Geoffrey, The Encyclopedia of Jewish Myth, Magic, and Mysticism, Llewellyn Worldwide
