= The Hot Potato Boys =

- Written by: Alun Richards
- Directed by: Patrick Barton
- Country of origin: Australia
- Original language: English

Production
- Running time: 60 mins
- Production company: ABC

Original release
- Release: 21 August 1963 (Melbourne)
- Release: 11 September 1963 (Sydney)

The Hot Potato Boys is a 1963 Australian television play.

== Plot ==
The snobbish daughter of a naval captain becomes engaged to the son of a Commodore.

== Cast ==
- Kenric Hudson as Commodore Maybe
- Kurt Ludescher
- John Morgan
- Noel Tovey as Sub Lt Godfrey Maybe
- Mary Ward as Milicent Mayne
- Julia Blake as Hong Kong Anna
- Syd Conabere
- Peter Aanensen as Captain Culver
- Roma Johnston as Sadie Culver
- Deirdre O'Day as Joan Culver

== Production ==
It was the ABC debut of Julia Blake who had recently moved from England to Australia.
