= Last Dance (2012 film) =

- Blu-Ray Disc cover
- Directed by: David Pulbrook
- Screenplay by: Terence Hammond; David Pulbrook
- Produced by: Antony I. Ginnane
- Starring: Julia Blake; Firass Dirani
- Cinematography: Lee Pulbrook
- Edited by: Phil Reid
- Music by: Michael Allen
- Production companies: Screen Australia; Ulah; Film Victoria; Melbourne International Film Festival Premiere Fund
- Distributed by: Becker Film Group
- Release date: 30 June 2012 (Australia)
- Running time: 90 minutes
- Country: Australia
- Language: English
- Budget: <A$2 million

Last Dance is a 2012 Australian thriller film directed by David Pulbrook and starring Firass Dirani, Julia Blake, Alan Hopgood.

== Plot ==
A Muslim man (Firass Dirani) kidnaps an elderly Melbourne Jewish woman (Julia Blake) and holds her hostage.

== Cast ==
- Firass Dirani as Sadiq Mohammad
- Julia Blake as Ulah Lippmann
- Alan Hopgood as Mr Nathan
- Marta Kaczmarek as Mrs Ruben
- Danielle Carter as Sophie

== Production ==
The female lead was meant to be Gena Rowlands but her casting was opposed by the MEAA.

== Release ==
The film had its international premiere at the 2012 Melbourne International Film Festival.
