= The Misanthrope (1974 film) =

- Directed by: Carl Schultz
- Based on: play by Moliere
- Produced by: Carl Schultz
- Starring: John Krummel; Fay Kelton; Neil Fitzpatrick
- Production companies: ABC; NSW Greenroom Society
- Distributed by: ABC
- Release dates: 12 October 1974 (Sydney); 17 October 1974 (Melbourne)
- Running time: 75 mins
- Country: Australia
- Language: English

The Misanthrope is a 1974 Australian film adaptation of the play The Misanthrope by Moliere. It was one of a series of four play adaptations the ABC made around this time, others including Hamlet, A Hard God and Spoiled.

John Tasker produced the original stage production for the Greenroom Society at the University of New South Wales. Robyn Graham did the stage design. The production was so well received it was filmed by the ABC.

== Premise ==
Alceste is determined to tell the truth in life. He falls in love with Celimene.

== Cast ==
- John Krummel as Alceste
- Fay Kelton as Celimene
- Neil Fitzpatrick as Oronte
- June Collins as Arsinoe
- Paul Roebuck as Philinte
- Rosalind Hinde as Eliante
- Graham Byrne as Clitandra
- Denis Scott as Dubois
- Pierre Romano as Basque
