= Carl Schultz =

Hungarian-Australian film director (born 1939)

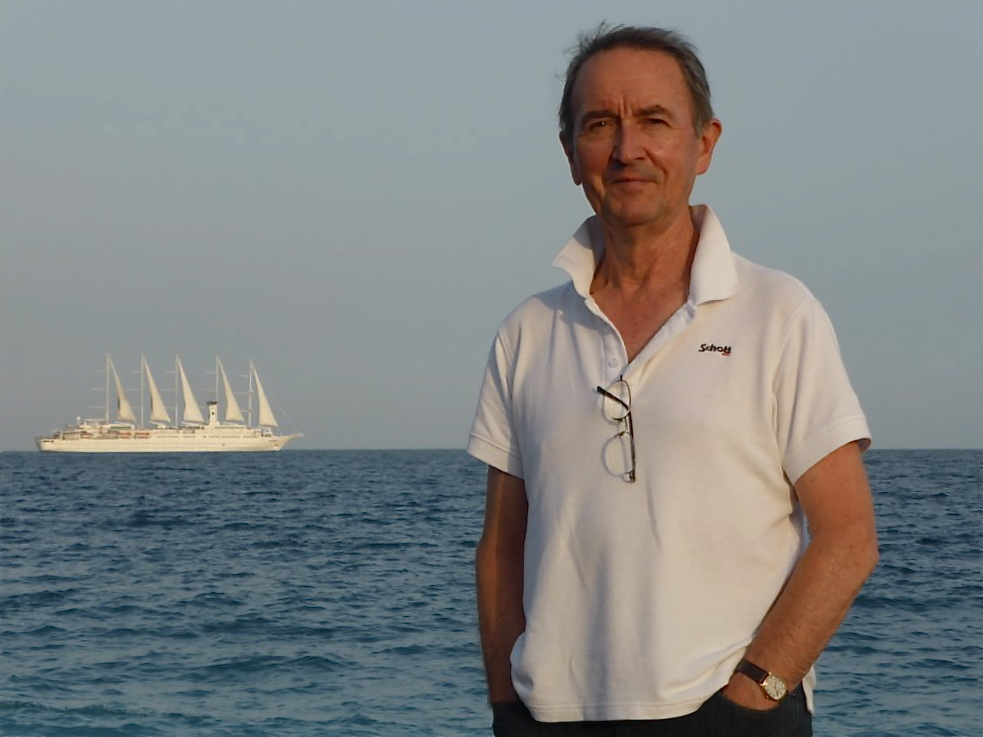
- Born: 19 September 1939 (age 87); Budapest, Hungary
- Occupation: Film director

Carl Schultz (born 19 September 1939) is a Hungarian-Australian film director.

== Early life and works ==
He left his native Budapest during the uprising of 1956 with his brother Otto Schultz. They fled to England, and after arriving in London they moved to Manchester. In 1958, Schultz emigrated to Australia by himself, where he worked for Australian TV, first as a cameraman, and then as a director.

== Professional career ==
In 1978, he directed his first feature film, Blue Fin, starring Hardy Kruger. His more notable film credits include Careful, He Might Hear You, winner of eight Australian Film Institute Awards, including Best Director and Best Film; Travelling North, with Leo McKern; and The Seventh Sign, starring Demi Moore and Jürgen Prochnow.

== Awards ==
- 1982 — Nominated AFI Award Best Direction for: Goodbye Paradise (1983)
- 1983 — Won AFI Award Best Director for: Careful, He Might Hear You (1983)
- 1990 — Nominated for International Fantasy Film Award Best Film for: The Seventh Sign (1988)
- 1997 — Nominated AFI Award Best Screenplay Adapted from Another Sourcefor: Love in Ambush (1997) (TV)

== Filmography ==
Television

- The Misanthrope (1974)
- A Touch of Reverence (1974)
- Ride on Stranger (1979)
- A Place in the World (1979)
- Levkas Man (1981)
- Young Indiana Jones (1992-1993)

Film

- Blue Fin (1978)
- Goodbye Paradise (1983)
- Careful, He Might Hear You (1983)
- Bullseye (1987)
- Travelling North (1987)
- The Seventh Sign (1988)
- Love in Ambush (1997)
- To Walk with Lions (1999)
