= The Sponge Room =

- Directed by: Patrick Barton
- Country of origin: Australia
- Original language: English

Production
- Running time: 50 mins
- Production company: ABC

Original release
- Release: 22 April 1964 (Melbourne)
- Release: 9 September 1964 (Sydney)

The Sponge Room is an Australian television film which aired in 1964 on ABC. Produced in Melbourne, it aired in a 50-minute time-slot and was an adaptation of an overseas stage play, written by Willis Hall and Keith Waterhouse.

It is not known if a copy of the television film still exists, given the wiping of the era.

== Premise ==
A married man secretly meets with a woman each week at the natural history museum in London.

== Cast ==
- Julia Blake as Hilary
- Terry Norris as Colin
- Neil Curnow as the attendant

== Production ==
The play had been produced on stage in Sydney that year under the direction of Ken Hannam. It had also been performed on ABC radio that year.

It was one of 20 TV plays produced by the ABC in 1964.

== Reception ==
The Sydney Morning Herald praised Barton using "the extremely effective device" of a background of "complete silence from start to finish".
