= Firass Dirani =

Australian actor (born 1984)

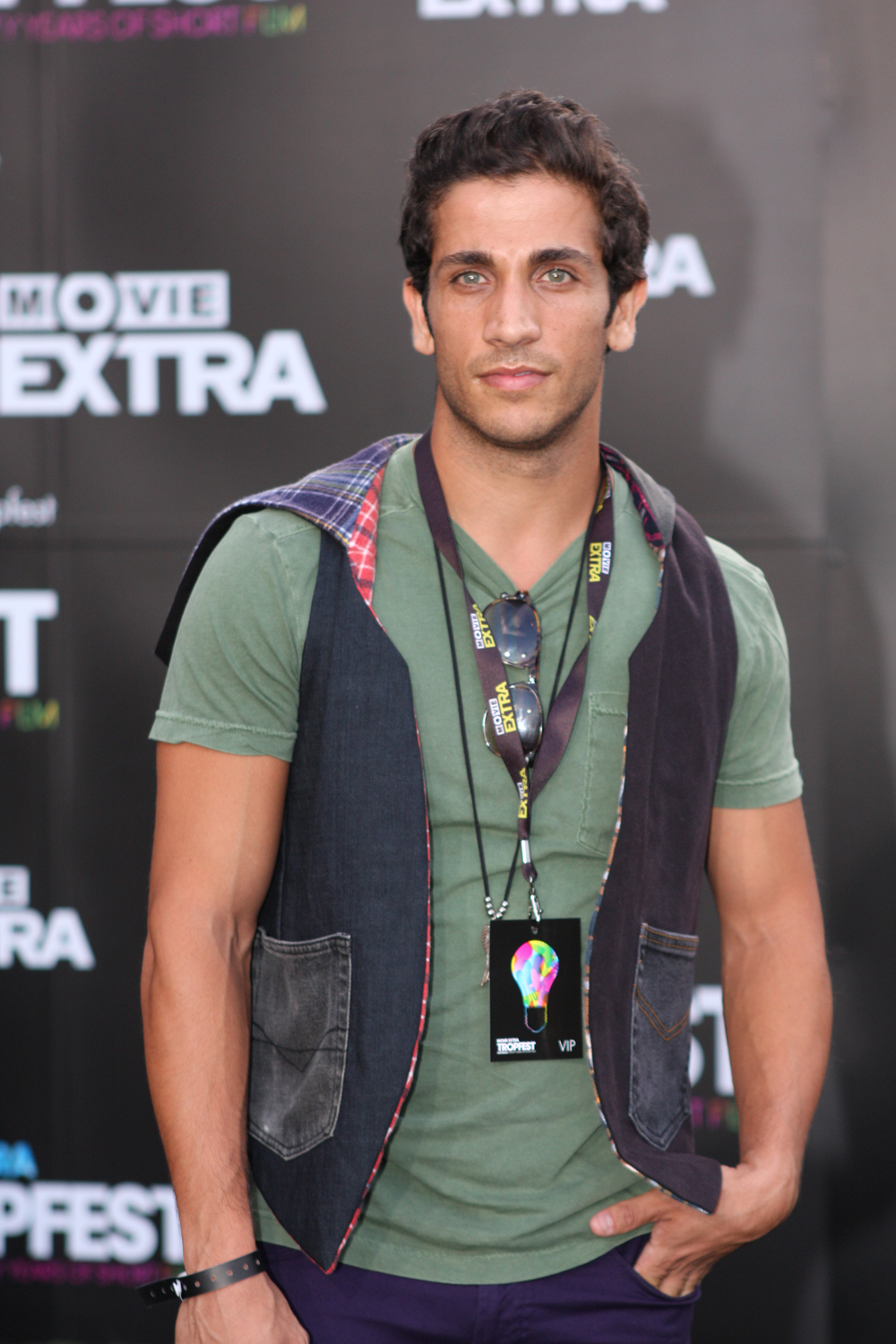
- Dirani in 2012
- Born: 1984 or 1985 (age 41–42); Sydney, New South Wales, Australia
- Education: St Paul's Grammar School (2002); Actors College of Theatre and Television (ACTT) (2004); Atlantic Theater Company (2014)
- Occupation: Actor
- Years active: 1998–present
- Known for: Power Rangers Mystic Force (2006); Underbelly: The Golden Mile (2010); House Husbands (2012)

Firass Dirani (born 1984 or 1985) is an Australian film and television actor best known for his roles in Power Rangers Mystic Force, Underbelly: The Golden Mile, and House Husbands.

== Early life and education ==
Firass Dirani was born in Blacktown in western Sydney in 1984 and grew up in the suburb of Werrington. He is of Lebanese descent. He worked in his family's shop for ten years. He attended St Paul's Grammar School and graduated in 2001.

He went on to study acting at the Actors College of Theatre and Television (ACTT) in Sydney, graduating from the Professional Actor Program in 2004.

== Career ==
Dirani played the main role of Nick Russell, the Red Mystic Ranger in Power Rangers Mystic Force in 2006. He then played the recurring role of Amen Salim in 2007 series Kick. He pursued his acting career in Hollywood before receiving a call to play the main role of John Ibrahim in Underbelly: The Golden Mile in 2010, the role which made him a household name in Australia.

In 2010, he was nominated for the Inside Film Awards 'Out of the Box' award and also won the GQ Australia Men of the Year ‘Best Television Actor’ award in the same year. In April 2010, Dirani was named Cleo Bachelor of the Year. In 2011, he won two Logie Awards – for Best New Talent and the Graham Kennedy Logie for Best Actor.

In 2012, Dirani went on to play Gary Montebello in drama series The Straits, before securing the ongoing main role of Justin in Logie-winning comedy drama House Husbands from 2012 to 2017.

In 2014 he briefly relocated to New York City where he undertook an intensive six week course of study at the Atlantic Theater Company.

In 2020, Dirani participated in Seven Network's reality program SAS Australia. He was given the 'villain edit', after repeatedly talking back and disrespecting the elite staff, prompting backlash from viewers on social media.

Dirani was selected to be a part of the Socceroos’ FIFA World Cup Qatar 2022 squad announcement, where he narrated the football journey of the Socceroos over 100 years.

In 2023, Dirani was cast in the Australian version of British series The Office, but did not make it to the production stage.

Dirani's film credits include the award-winning drama The Black Balloon (2008), The Combination (2009) and 2012 thriller Last Dance. He has also starred in Hollywood fare such as sci-fi film Pitch Black (2000) opposite Vin Diesel, action film Killer Elite (2011) alongside an all-star cast including Robert De Niro, Jason Statham, and Clive Owen and Mel Gibson's Oscar-winning biographical war epic Hacksaw Ridge (2015).

== Personal life ==
Dirani formerly dated fellow actor Melanie Vallejo whom he met when they worked together on Power Rangers Mystic Force.

Dirani was the subject of a finalist portrait in the Archibald Prize in 2021, painted by artist, Jeremy Eden.

In 2017, Dirani embarked on a trip to Nairobi, Kenya for two months to run a sports program, which saw him organise some football goalposts to be built while visiting a local charity, so that the kids could play with more suitable equipment.

== Filmography ==
=== Film ===
Year	Title	Role	Notes
2000	Pitch Black	Ali	Feature film
2000	Lost	John Savvides	Short film
2001	My Husband, My Killer	Butch	TV movie
2002	Change	Joe Change	Short film
2005	Small Claims: White Wedding	Pizza Delivery Boy	TV movie
2006	The Silence	Anthony Vassalio	TV movie
2006	The Marine	Al Qaeda Leader	Feature film
2008	The Black Balloon	Russell	Feature film
2008	Crooked Business	Stevie	Feature film
2009	The Combination	Charlie	Feature film
2011	Killer Elite	Bakhait	Feature film
2012	Last Dance	Sadiq Mohammad	Feature film
2012	In the Clear	Brooklyn Thompson	Short film
2013	Taser	Eddie	Short film
2016	Hacksaw Ridge	Vito Rinnelli	Feature film
2016	The Osiris Child: Science Fiction Volume One	Clarence Carmel	Feature film
2017	Bang! Bang!	Felix Husk	Short film
2019	Escape and Evasion	Welshy	Feature film

=== Television ===
Year	Title	Role	Notes
1998	Children's Hospital	Marc	1 episode
2000	The Potato Factory	David Soloman	4 episodes
2002	White Collar Blue	Nick Zenopoulous	1 episode
2003	All Saints	Joe Malouf	1 episode
2006	Power Rangers Mystic Force	Nick Russell (Red Mystic Ranger)	32 episodes (Main role)
2007	Kick	Amen Salim	13 episodes
2007	East West 101	Talai	1 episode
2010	Underbelly	John Ibrahim	13 episodes
2012	The Straits	Gary Montebello	10 episodes
2012–17	House Husbands	Justin	58 episodes
2018	Sando	Kevin Kenan	4 episodes
2018	Mr Inbetween	Davros	2 episodes
2018	Orange Is the New Brown	Zain	4 episodes
2019	The Real Dirty Dancing	Self	TV series
2020	SAS Australia: Who Dares Wins	Self	10 episodes

== Theatre ==
Year	Title	Role	Notes
2003	Sydney Dream Ball	Aerial Acrobat	
2003	Stories		
2003	A Midsummer Night's Dream	Puck	
2003	Kid Stakes / Other Times		
2004	The Tempest	Caliban	University of Sydney, Theatre 3, Acton, Canberra, Lennox Theatre, Parramatta, Laycock Street Theatre, Gosford with Actors College of Theatre and Television
2018	The Effect	Tristan	Old Fitzroy Theatre, Sydney with Redline Productions

== Awards ==
Date	Work	Award	Category	Result
2010	Underbelly: The Golden Mile	Inside Film Awards	Media Super 'Out of the Box' IF Award	Nominated
2010	Firass Dirani	GQ Men of the Year Awards	Best Television Actor	Won
2010	Firass Dirani	Cleo Bachelor of the Year		Won
2011	Underbelly: The Golden Mile	Logie Awards	Most Popular New Male Talent	Won
2011	Underbelly: The Golden Mile	Logie Awards	Graham Kennedy Award for Most Outstanding New Talent	Won
2011	Underbelly: The Golden Mile	Equity Ensemble Awards	Outstanding Performance by an Ensemble in a Drama Series	Nominated
	Firass Dirani	FHM Heroes Award	Best Television Actor	Won
2013	The Straits	Logie Awards	Silver Logie for Most Popular Actor	Nominated
2013	House Husbands	Logie Awards	Silver Logie for Most Popular Actor	Nominated
2014	House Husbands	Equity Ensemble Awards	Outstanding Performance by an Ensemble in a Drama Series	Nominated
2016	House Husbands	Logie Awards	Silver Logie for Best Actor	Nominated
