= A Man for All Seasons (1964 film) =

- Ad in The Age 16 Oct 1963
- Based on: A Man for All Seasons; 1960 play by Robert Bolt
- Written by: Noel Robinson
- Directed by: William Sterling
- Starring: John Gray; Wyn Roberts; Neil Curnow
- Music by: Robert Hughes
- Country of origin: Australia
- Original language: English

Production
- Producer: William Sterling
- Running time: 90 mins
- Production company: ABC

Original release
- Network: ABC
- Release: 16 October 1963 (Melbourne, live)
- Release: 15 January 1964 (Sydney, taping)

A Man for All Seasons is a 1964 Australian television play. It is an adaptation of the play by Robert Bolt.

It was directed by William Sterling who thought the play was "the finest in construction and conception on the large heroic scale to come out of England since the War. Bolt has captured the seething historical background of the period as well as conceiving magnificent character studies of famous people of the time."

== Cast ==
- Wynn Roberts as Sir Thomas More
- John Gray as The Common Man
- Kevin McBeath as Thomas Cromwell
- Neil Curnow as Robert Rich
- Hugh Stewart as the Duke of Norfolk
- Terri Aldred as Alice More
- Fay Kelton as Margaret More
- Douglas Kelly as Cardinal Wolsey
- Terry Norris as King Henry VIII
- Bruce Morton as William Roper
- John Morgan as Chapuys
- Campbell Copelin as Cramner
- Barbara Brandon as a woman
- Laurence Beck as Chapuys' attendant

== Production ==
The play debuted on stage in Australia in 1962 for the Elizabethan Theatre Trust with Robert Speaght as Sir Thomas More.

The show was shot in Melbourne. Sterling elected not to use "fades" in his production.

== Reception ==
The Age said it "translated convincingly on the TV screen", calling it a "production which, though not perfect gave glamor to honesty."

The TV critic from the Sydney Morning Herald thought that "the stage devices" of the original play "were all too evident for the good of its TV adaptation", notably the reliance of one set for all the action, and the use of the device of the Common Man, adding "the black and white directness of television demands less pageant-like solemnity. But it was able to assist valuably when the dialogue came alive with character and force."

The Bulletin said William Sterling is perhaps the most distinctive and stylistic producer in Australian television. In each of his shows he rarely misses an opportunity for adventurous experiment with lighting or camera-angles." He called the production of A Man for All Seasons "superb" adding that it "succeeded where some of his [Sterling's] previous productions have failed, because all his gimmicks worked, and worked magnificently, so that the effect was exciting where it may have been (and has been) merely tricksy and pretentious."
