= Stephen Ashbrook =

American singer-songwriter

- Genres: Alternative rock, acoustic rock
- Occupations: Musician, songwriter
- Instruments: Vocals, guitar
- Years active: 1993–present
- Website: www.stephenashbrook.com

Stephen Ashbrook (born January 10, 1971, in Newport Beach, California) is a Phoenix, Arizona-based singer songwriter. Ashbrook rose to fame in the mid-1990s in his home state of Arizona, riding the wave of the Tempe music scene while performing with his band Satellite. Many bands, including the Gin Blossoms, The Refreshments and Dead Hot Workshop, found success with this guitar-driven rock music. Ashbrook has toured with Roger Clyne and the Peacemakers, among others, and has performed for President Bill Clinton.

== Discography ==
Year	Title	Details
1993	About Last Night	About Last Night (1993) is the first album by Stephen Ashbrook. Originally released as a cassette EP in 1993, it was later re-released on CD. Track listing: 1. "About Last Night" – 4:37; 2. "Again" - 4:04; 3. "Affection" - 3:51; 4. "Perry Avenue" - 3:18; 5. "10,000 Henchmen" - 4:15; 6. "I'm On Fire" - 5:02; 7. "All I Ever Wanted" - 4:40
1995	Satellite	Satellite is the first full-length and second studio album by Stephen Ashbrook. The album was recorded with his band Satellite. Track listing: 1. "I Don't Mind" - 3:13; 2. "About Last Night" - 4:27; 3. "Sometimes Just One Time" - 3:31; 4. "Watch You Through Your Window" - 4:57; 5. "10,000 Henchmen" - 5:03; 6. "Right On Time" - 3:48; 7. "E" - 4:58; 8. "I Know I'm Right" - 5:39; 9. "Lullaby" - 3:30
1998	Navigator	Navigator is the first solo album and third studio album by Stephen Ashbrook. The critically acclaimed album is recorded strictly with acoustic guitar, harmonica, and vocals, and includes the singer's favorite song Summer of '76. Track listing: 1. "Summer of '76" - 4:36; 2. "I'd Sure Like That A Lot" - 2:46; 3. "I Swear" - 4:53; 4. "All Time Low" - 3:45; 5. "One Good Man" - 3:28; 6. "Mama Rings The Bell" - 3:14; 7. "15 Dollars" - 1:39; 8. "Page" - 3:03; 9. "Kansas City" - 3:31; 10. "Clove Cigarette" - 3:46; 11. "Venus" - 4:06; 12. "So The King Might Ride Again" - 4:15
2001	Drive	Drive is the fourth studio album by Stephen Ashbrook. Track listing: 1. "Drive" - 5:25; 2. "Na Na Na" - 2:22; 3. "High" - 3:30; 4. "All Time Low" - 4:24; 5. "Some of the Things" - 5:31; 6. "Venus" - 5:02; 7. "Just Slow Down" - 2:43; 8. "Another Boring Day" - 4:31; 9. "A Man For All Seasons" - 3:08; 10. "Fastest Car" - 5:57
2002	American B-Sides	American B-Sides is the fifth studio album by Stephen Ashbrook. Track listing: 1. "Rock-n-Roll" - 4:36; 2. "Scotch And A Handgun" - 3:27; 3. "The Hard Part" - 4:05; 4. "I Feel Good" - 3:53; 5. "Good Friend" - 2:32; 6. "Carolina" - 4:26; 7. "A La De Da" - 2:59; 8. "Fancy That" - 2:42; 9. "Better Than Anything" - 3:49; 10. "Houston" - 5:11; 11. "Railroaded" - 3:08
2004	Double Live @ Long Wong's	Double Live @ Long Wong's is the first live album by Stephen Ashbrook. Track listing Disc 1: 1. "Intro by James Swafford"; 2. "Scotch And A Handgun"; 3. "The Hard Part"; 4. "Better Than Anything"; 5. "Some Of The Things"; 6. "Kansas City"; 7. "All Time Low"; 8. "Clove Cigarette"; 9. "Good Friend"; 10. "Always Coming Down To This"; 11. "I'd Sure Like That A Lot"; 12. "Page"; 13. "Sweet Alibi"; 14. "Beauty of Our Bodies"; 15. "Carolina"; 16. "E"; 17. "So The King Might Ride Again"; Disc 2: 1. "Watch You Through Your Window"; 2. "A La De Da"; 3. "White Flag"; 4. "I Feel Good"; 5. "Lullaby"; 6. "Houston"; 7. "Rock-n-Roll"; 8. "Fastest Car"; 9. "You Were Wrong"; 10. "I Don't Mind"; 11. "About Last Night"; 12. "Summer of '76"
2008	White Balloons	White Balloons is Stephen Ashbrook's sixth studio album, and first since 2002's American B-Sides. Track listing: 1. "Carelessly" - 4:01; 2. "Geronimo" - 3:45; 3. "BarStar" - 3:40; 4. "White Balloons" - 4:20; 5. "Good Life" - 3:36; 6. "You Are Here" - 3:55; 7. "Shame" - 3:49; 8. "Try (Try To Fall In Love)" - 3:18; 9. "21 Young" - 3:35; 10. "First Time" - 3:05; 11. "Mile Marker 45" - 3:33
