= The Physicists =

1961 tragic comedy by Friedrich Dürrenmatt

The Physicists (German: Die Physiker) is a German satirical drama/tragic comedy written in 1961 by Swiss writer Friedrich Dürrenmatt. The play was mainly written as a result of the Second World War and many advances in science and nuclear technology. The play deals with questions of scientific ethics and humanity's general ability to manage its intellectual responsibility. It is often recognized as his most impressive yet most easily understood work.

The play was first performed in Zürich in 1962 and published the same year by the publisher Die Arche. It was translated into English by James Kirkup, and first published in the US in 1964 by Grove Press, under its Evergreen imprint.

== Synopsis ==
The story is set in the drawing room of the German sanatorium Les Cerisiers, which is a noble psychiatric home for the mentally ill, run by a doctor and psychologist, Fräulein Doktor Mathilde von Zahnd. The main room, where the play is set, is connected to three other rooms, each of which is inhabited by a patient. These three men, who are all physicists by trade, are permitted use of the drawing room, where they are monitored and checked on by the female nurses. Herbert Georg Beutler is the first patient, and he is convinced that he is Sir Isaac Newton. The second patient is Ernst Heinrich Ernesti, who believes himself to be Albert Einstein. The third patient is Johann Wilhelm Möbius, and he believes that he is regularly visited by the biblical King Solomon.

Once the play begins, it is revealed to the audience that "Einstein" has just killed one of his nurses, and the police are examining the scene. The inspector Richard Voß continuously questions the doctor and indirectly insults the "mentally ill" patients. It is revealed through their discussion that this is the second murder of a nurse by one of the three patients in just three months, the first having been committed by "Newton".

The motives behind the three murders become clearer as the play advances into the second act, where it is revealed with startling abruptness that not even one of the three patients is actually mad; they are all only faking insanity for various reasons.

On orders of the state attorney, the inspector convinces the doctor to exchange the remaining female nurses with male caretakers. After the inspector leaves, Möbius is visited by his former wife Lina and his three sons, and Lina's new husband, the missionary Oskar Rose. Missionary Rose got a position at the Mariana Islands and Lina and the boys are visiting Möbius to say their final goodbye. Möbius tries to persuade his youngest son to not too become a physicist and seemingly falls into a maniacal trance-like monologue and chases them off.

After the visitors leave, the nurse Monika Stettler talks with Möbius. During their conversation she tells him that she loves him and that she believes in his conversations with Solomon, or at least his scientific theories and manuscripts, and tries to convince him to leave the institution with her and become a scientist again. Möbius subsequently strangles her to death.

At the beginning of the play's second act the police take the body, and the seemingly distressed doctor von Zahnd introduces the new intimidating male caretakers and has bars installed on all the rooms’ windows. Afterwards the three patients are finally left alone for the night.

In the play's following climactic scene, the three men all finally reveal their secrets.

Möbius published many studies as a solution to the problem of gravitation, a "Unitary Theory of Elementary Particles", and the "Principle of Universal Discovery". Fearing what humanity could do with these powerful discoveries, he feigned madness, in hopes that he might be put in a home for the mentally ill and thus be protected along with his knowledge.

However, he failed to avoid the attention which he so dearly feared. "Einstein" and "Newton" are both spies, representatives of two different countries of the Cold War, and they have infiltrated the Les Cerisiers in order to secure Möbius' documents and, if possible, the man himself. Each spy had to murder a nurse who each were in love with them, to protect their secrets and to strengthen their simulation of madness, as well as to further conceal their identities.

The two spies first threaten each other and then, each of the two attempts to convince Möbius to come with them. Möbius, however, persuades them that the secrets he has discovered are too terrible for man to know and assures them that their efforts are in vain because he recently burned all the manuscripts that he developed during his time in the sanatorium. After much debate, the three men finally agree that they are content to protect humanity by living out the rest of their lives in captivity, while furthering and serving physics.

These noble plans are quickly changed by the play's final plot twist; Fräulein Doktor Mathilde von Zahnd enters the room and reveals to the three men that she has eavesdropped on their entire conversation. Furthermore, she admits to knowing about Möbius for years and has been secretly copying his documents. She reveals that she has been using his scientific discoveries to construct an international empire which she would later rule. She believes that King Solomon is speaking to her, and that, with Solomon‘s guidance and Möbius' discoveries, she can become the most powerful woman on earth.

The story ends with a sense of impending doom. Möbius, "Newton", and "Einstein" have been tricked and trapped. The play ends with each of the men speaking to the audience, emphasizing their plight and the plight of all humanity. In their eyes, humanity was lost and could not be helped.

== Adaptations ==
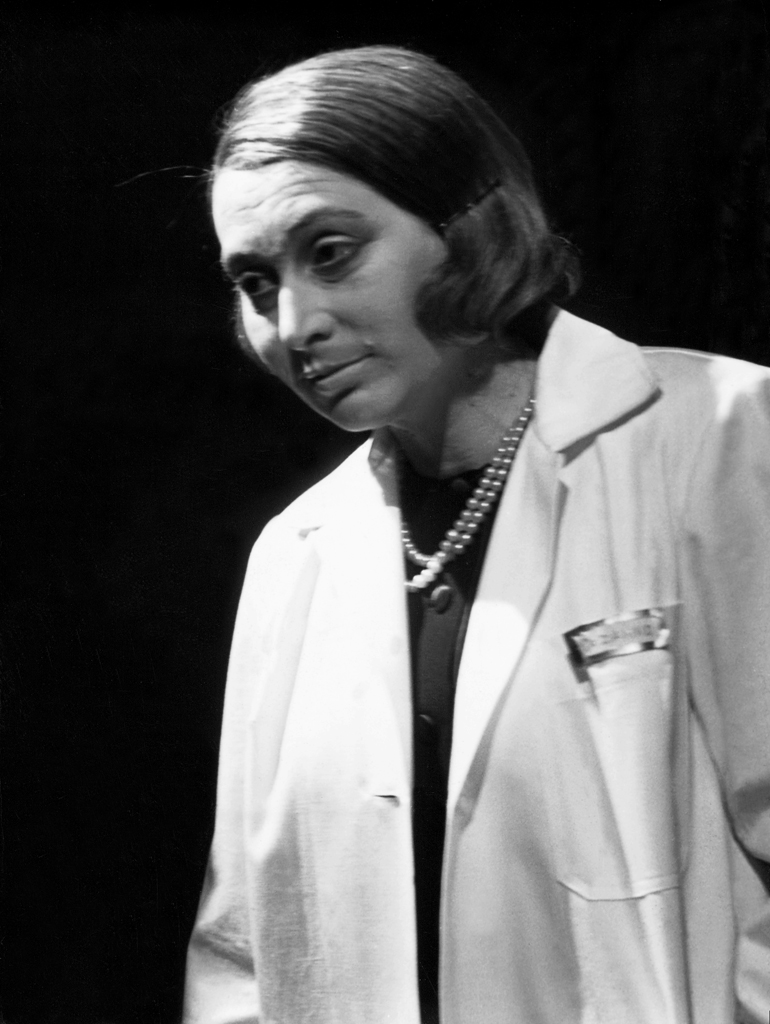
Štefka Drolc as Mathilde von Zahnd in a 1963 play by Ljubljana Slovene National Theatre Drama

A 1963 radio play adaptation by Schweizer Radio DRS.

It was adapted for Australian TV.

A 1964 television adaptation was produced by Süddeutscher Rundfunk and directed by Fritz Umgelter.

In 1988, a TV movie The Physicists (Russian: Физики, romanized: Phisiki) was produced by the Lentelefilm studio in the USSR. This adaptation ends with the inspector Richard Voß busting Mathilde's plans by hiding in her office and observing her reveal via security camera to which she reacts with a scream of horror.

BBC radio version 17/10/1963 (repeated 8/11/1963 & 5/3/1972) produced by William Glen-Doepel; and BBC World Service radio versions from c1981 & 7/7/1991.

In January 2013, BBC Radio 3 broadcast an adaptation by Matt Thompson with Samantha Bond as Doctor von Zahnd, Geoffrey Whitehead as the inspector, John Hodgkinson as Möbius, Thom Tuck as Newton, John Bett as Einstein, and Madeleine Worrall as both Nurse Monika and Mrs Rose.

== 1964 Australian TV version ==
The play was adapted for Australian TV in 1964 by the Australian Broadcasting Commission in Melbourne. Australian drama was relatively rare at the time and it was common for local versions of overseas plays to be produced.

=== Premise ===
At a mental asylum in Europe, police investigate the murder of two nurses who were assigned to three inmates, all physicists: Mobius, Beutler, and Ernesti. Mobius imagines himself as in contact with King Solomon. Beutel and Ernesti maintain they are Newton and Einstein.

=== Cast ===
- Terry Norris as Beutler
- Wynn Roberts as Mobius
- Robert Peach as Ernesti
- Syd Conabere
- Brian James
- Patricia Kennedy as psychiatrist
- Gerda Nicolson
- Elizabeth Wing

=== Production ===
The play had been first produced in London in January 1963 and made its Australian stage premiere in St Martins Theatre Sydney, October 1963.

It was one of 20 TV plays produced by the ABC in 1964. Chris Muir described the play as "full of the unexpected and rich in dramatic climaxes. It is also a play of black humour. Dürrenmatt, while making us laugh at ourselves, makes us feel uncomfortable in the process by showing us our failings often through grotesque imagery."

=== Reception ===
The critic for the Sydney Morning Herald wrote that the production:

Shifted the convincing effects in the play from the chaff of its thriller-comedy element. The light relief dialogue is there for the purpose of keeping a puzzled live audience amused, and on television this doubtful sprinkling of humour did not come through; similarly the two murders and police investigations range false in such unrealistic treatment. Christopher Muir... followed Duerrenmatt's directions closely, imposing on television the geometrical pattern of the asylum common room with its three cell doors and the curiously clockwork behaviour of the characters. As though seen under a magnifying glass, the gripping features of the play showed clear and sharp; the only real and understandable figure, fortunately one central to the play, was given a worthy portrayal by Wynn Roberts (although one of his big scenes was cut). This was Mobius, the genius impelled by both fear and courage. Tension is well supplied to the second half of the play by, the unexpected twists of the plot, and the cold, lucid arguments of the three physicists were excellently focused in this production.
