= Nude with Violin (film) =

- Poster in the Age 8 Apr 1964
- Based on: play Nude with Violin by Noël Coward
- Written by: Laurence Collinson
- Directed by: Christopher Muir
- Country of origin: Australia
- Original language: English

Production
- Producer: Christopher Muir
- Running time: 75 mins
- Production company: Australian Broadcasting Commission

Original release
- Network: ABC
- Release: 8 April 1964 (Melbourne)
- Release: 15 July 1964 (Sydney)

Nude with Violin is a 1964 television play broadcast by the Australian Broadcasting Corporation based on the play Nude with Violin by Noël Coward. It was directed by Christopher Muir.

== Plot ==
In Paris in 1856, a famous artist, Paul Sorodin, has died. His estranged wife and children arrive from London for his funeral. Accompanied by Sordin's manager, they arrive to discover the apartment is occupied by Sordin's valet. Questions arise as to the authenticity of Sorodin's pictures.

== Cast ==
- Terry Norris as Sebastien Lacreole
- Gerda Nicolson as Jane Sorodin
- Julia Blake as Pamela
- Alex Varadi as Jacob Friedland
- Roma Johnstone as Anya Pavalikov
- Barbara Brandon as Isobel Sorodin
- Brian Hansford as Obadiah Lelwellyn
- Terence Donovan as Clinton Preminger
- Follie Settees as Cherry May
- Karl Lukk as Fabrice
- Nick Sofokles as Lauderdale

== Production ==
It was one of 20 TV plays produced by the ABC in 1964. Terry Norris played the role performed on stage in England by John Gielgud and Robert Helpmann in Australia.

It was designed by Alan Clarke.

== Reception ==
The Sydney Morning Heraldsaid the production "could do no more than echo the play's half-hearted efforts... the cast that took part looked uconvinced [sic?] with the desperately contrived situations."
