= Robin Ramsay (actor) =

Australian actor

- Born: Melbourne, Victoria, Australia
- Education: Royal Academy of Dramatic Art
- Occupation: Actor
- Years active: 1957-2015
- Family: William Ramsay (grandfather); Tamasin Ramsay (daughter)

Robin Ramsay is an Australian former television, film and stage actor. He appeared in the rural series Bellbird as Charlie Cousins, in which he was best known for the scene in which he falls to his death from a wheat silo.

== Early life and education ==
Ramsay studied at London's Royal Academy of Dramatic Art, graduating in 1957. He worked in England briefly before returning to Australia in 1958.

== Personal life ==
Ramsay is father of Robina Ramsay, an internationally ranked dressage rider, and actress Tamasin Ramsay.

== Career ==
=== Theatre ===
After returning to Australia, Ramsay joined the fledgling Union Theatre Company in Melbourne. He starred in Moon on a Rainbow Shawl, produced for the first Adelaide Festival in 1960.

He has played roles in theatre locally starting from 1957 and then went to the United States in 1961 and joined the Theatre Company of Boston. He then toured the country in The National Repertory Theatre, with Eva Le Gallienne and Faye Emerson.

In 1964, he took over the role of Fagin in the hit musical Oliver! on Broadway, a role he played for a further two years in New York, followed by a record-breaking national tour. He shared the bill with The Beatles, singing a song from the musical in a subsequently memorable edition of The Ed Sullivan Show. In 1966, Ramsay recreated his role of Fagin for a West End revival of Oliver!.

=== Television ===
Returning to Australia, Ramsay's role as Charlie Cousens in Bellbird, Australia's first successful television soap opera, garnered him considerable public notice. A regular character on the show from August 1967, Ramsay left in May 1968 to take the role of Fagin in a New York stage production of Oliver!.

Ramsay suggested that his character be killed-off, and the show's producers agreed and had Charlie fall off a wheat silo to his death. The scene has been described as "one of the most-watched and best-remembered moments in Australian TV history", and fans wrote letters protesting about his death and even sent flowers to his funeral.

He appeared in the TV movie Wicked City.

=== Return to stage ===
Ramsay returned to the theatre playing the controversial priest Daniel Berrigan in the Trial of the Catonsville Nine in Sydney. He went on to play Pontius Pilate in Jim Sharman's original production of Jesus Christ Superstar. He was in the first production at the opening of the Sydney Opera House in 1972: playing MacHeath in The Threepenny Opera. Ramsay spent the next few years as a leading actor with the Sydney Theatre Company, the Melbourne Theatre Company, and working in film and television. He has twice won the Melbourne Critics Circle Award for Best Actor. He was in Medea, the opening production of the Melbourne Arts Centre, playing opposite Zoe Caldwell.

In 1976, he starred as George Szabo in the Old Tote Theatre Company production of The Wolf by Ferene Molnar. In 1977, with Rodney Fisher, he developed his first solo show, drawn from the writings of Henry Lawson, The Bastard From The Bush. This refocusing on Lawson as a sophisticated short-story writer and diarist, rather than as a 'bush poet', radically altered Australia's view of their favourite icon. The play toured to Riverside Studios in London, and played extended seasons at Sydney's Belvoir Street Theatre and the Victorian Arts Centre. The production won the Australian Arts Award

In the early 1980s Ramsay was commissioned to create a new solo show celebrating the life and times of Rabindranath Tagore, India's Nobel Prize-winning poet: titled Borderland. The invitation came from the Indian High Commission in Canberra. The play was performed in Australia, then toured to more than 60 countries, in tandem with The Bastard from the Bush.

Ramsay then formed his own chamber theatre company, "Open Secret", and continued touring internationally, developing new productions, notably Vikram Seth's Beastly Tales from Here and There and incorporating local musicians into the company's presentations. His new solo play The Accidental Mystic, high times on the Indian ashram trail, written by his wife Barbara Bossert, opened at Melbourne's Malthouse Theatre in 1995, after seasons in Sydney and the Edinburgh Festival. The play toured to London and throughout India. Ramsay was nominated for a Melbourne Critics Circle Best Actor Award for his performance.

In 1994 he toured the Tokyo International Theatre Festival with the Playbox Theatre.

=== Producing and directing ===
In 2008, he produced and directed the feature film Tao of the Traveller, a spiritual adventure film which won a Best Film Award at the South African International Film Festival in 2008, and was selected for screening at several festivals in 2009, including the British Film Festival in Los Angeles, Egypt International Film Festival, Thailand International Film Festival, and Swansea Bay International Film Festival. In 2008 the film was also invited to the Fallbrook Film Festival in California, and won awards in the Research and Experimental categories at the Accolade Film Festival.

== Filmography ==
=== Film ===
| Year | Title | Role | Notes |
|---|---|---|---|
| 1975 | The Box | Bruce Madigan | |
| 1976 | Mad Dog Morgan | Roget | |
| 1976 | Oz | Glynn the Good Fairy | Feature film |
| 1980 | Bedfellows | | |
| 1982 | Running on Empty | Dad | |
| 1982 | Oliver Twist | Voice | Animated film |
| 1985 | A Street to Die | Tom | |
| 1987 | Dear Cardholder | Hec Harris | |
| 1991 | Requiem | | Short film |
| 1996 | Cosi | Minister for Health | |
| 2015 | Force of Destiny | Surgeon | |

=== Television ===
| Year | Title | Role | Notes |
|---|---|---|---|
| 1959 | Till Death Do Us Part | | TV movie |
| 1960 | No Picnic Tomorrow | Tony | TV movie |
| 1967 | Love and War | Mercutio | Miniseries, 1 episode |
| 1967–1968 | Bellbird | Charlie Cousens | Main cast |
| 1969 | The Cheerful Cuckold | Tony Champion | TV movie |
| 1970 | Music on 2 | Percy Grainger | 1 episode |
| 1972 | Jesus Christ Superstar | Pontius Pilate | TV movie |
| 1972 | How Could You Believe Me When I Said I'd Be Your Valet When You Know I've Been a Liar All My Life? | Truffalino | TV movie |
| 1973 | Ryan | Mario | 1 episode |
| 1974 | This Love Affair | | 1 episode |
| 1975 | Behind the Legend | Marcus Clarke | 1 episode |
| 1975 | Shannon's Mob | Andrew Blake | |
| 1976 | Tandarra | Dexter | Miniseries, 1 episode |
| 1978 | Tickled Pink | Richard | 1 episode |
| 1978 | Chopper Squad | Murray | 1 episode |
| 1981 | The Willow Bend Mystery | Adrian | 5 episodes |
| 1981 | The Mesmerist | | TV movie |
| 1983 | Silent Reach | Father Bridges | Miniseries, 2 episodes |
| 1984 | Carson's Law | Jeremy Forbes | 2 episodes |
| 1984 | Special Squad | Massini | 1 episode |
| 1984 | Conferenceville | | TV movie |
| 1986 | Return to Eden | Sheik Amahl | TV series |
| 1988 | The Flying Doctors | Lloyd Greenway | 1 episode |
| 1988 | Dadah Is Death | Wilf Barlow | Miniseries |
| 1990 | Embassy | Alex | 1 episode |
| 1994 | The Damnation of Harvey McHugh | Father Nillson | |
| 1995 | Mercury | Simon Hayes | Miniseries, 1 episode |

== Theatre ==
| Year | Title | Role | Company/Venue |
|---|---|---|---|
| 1957 | The Matchmaker | | Union Theatre |
| 1957 | Tonight in Samarkand | | Union Theatre |
| 1957 | Ring Round the Moon | | Union Theatre |
| 1957 | Cat on a Hot Tin Roof | | Union Theatre |
| 1957 | Arsenic and Old Lace | | Union Theatre |
| 1957 | A View from the Bridge | | Union Theatre |
| 1957 | Speak of the Devil | | Union Theatre |
| 1957 | Beauty and the Beast | | Union Theatre |
| 1957 | A Hatful of Rain | | Union Theatre |
| 1958 | Lola Montez | | Union Theatre |
| 1958 | A Streetcar Named Desire | | Union Theatre |
| 1958 | Hotel Paradiso | | Union Theatre |
| 1958 | The Knight of the Burning Pestle | | Union Theatre |
| 1958 | Blood Wedding | | Union Theatre |
| 1958 | The Threepenny Opera | | Union Theatre |
| 1958 | Lysistrata | | Union Theatre |
| 1959 | Moby Dick | | Union Theatre and Elizabethan Theatre |
| 1960 | Moon on a Rainbow Shawl | | MTC at Union Hall for Adelaide Festival |
| 1964–1966 | Oliver! | Fagin | Broadway and West End |
| 1966 | The Knack | | Russell Street Theatre |
| 1967 | A Flea in Her Ear | | Russell Street Theatre and Canberra Theatre |
| 1967 | The Servant of Two Masters | | Russell Street Theatre |
| 1967 | Incident at Vichy | | Russell Street Theatre |
| 1968 | Everything in the Garden | | Russell Street Theatre |
| 1968 | A Day in the Death of Joe Egg | | Russell Street Theatre, Theatre Royal, Hobart and The Little Theatre Launceston |
| 1969 | Henry IV, Part 1 | | Octagon Theatre and Keith Murdoch Court, Melbourne |
| 1969 | The Country Wife | | Russell Street Theatre and Canberra Theatre |
| 1969 | Loot | | Russell Street Theatre |
| 1969 | The Soldiers | | Russell Street Theatre and Canberra Theatre |
| 1969 | A Long View | | Russell Street Theatre |
| 1970 | Trial of the Catonsville Nine | | Pitt Street Congregational Church |
| 1970 | Day of Glory | | Russell Street Theatre |
| 1970 | The Devils | | Russell Street Theatre |
| 1970 | Son of Man' | | Russell Street Theatre |
| 1970–1971 | All's Well That Ends Well | | Princess Theatre, Canberra Theatre and Octagon Theatre |
| 1971 | The Government Inspector | | Russell Street Theatre |
| 1972 | How Could You Believe Me When I Said I'd Be Your Valet When You Know I've Been a Liar All My Life? | | Canberra Theatre |
| 1972–1973 | The Threepenny Opera | MacHeath | Sydney Opera House |
| 1972–1973 | Jesus Christ Superstar | Pontius Pilate | Jim Sharman production at Festival Hall, Kings Park Perth, Princess Theatre, Hobart City Hall, Palais Theatre, Capitol Theatre |
| 1974 | Pericles, Prince of Tyre | | Russell Street Theatre |
| 1975 | The Taming of the Shrew | | SGIO Theatre |
| 1975 | Absurd Person Singular | | St Martins Theatre, Melbourne |
| 1975 | When Voyaging | | Playhouse Adelaide |
| 1976 | The Wolf | | Parade Theatre, University of NSW |
| 1976 | Martello Towers | | Nimrod |
| 1977 | Yamashita | | Playhouse Canberra |
| 1977 | The Merchant of Venice | | Athenaeum Theatre |
| 1977 | The Bastard from the Bush | Rodney Fisher | Belvoir Street Theatre, Russell Street Theatre, Victorian Arts Centre, Riverside Studios London and Nimrod |
| 1978 | Rock-Ola | | Nimrod and Scott Theatre, Adelaide |
| 1979 | P.S. Your Cat Is Dead | | The Space Adelaide and Comedy Theatre, Melbourne |
| 1980 | The Sunny South | Eli Grupp | Sydney Opera House |
| 1980 | Cyrano de Bergerac | | Sydney Opera House |
| 1980 | The Merry Wives of Windsor | | Sydney Opera House |
| 1980–1981 | The Magic Pudding | | Sydney Opera House, Victorian country tour, Western Australian tour, The Playhouse Adelaide |
| 1982 | Macbeth | | Sydney Opera House |
| 1982 | The Butterflies of Kalimantan | | Stables Theatre |
| 1982–1983 | Trafford Tanzi | | Seymour Centre, Comedy Theatre, Melbourne |
| 1983 | On Our Selection | | Athenaeum Theatre |
| 1983–1984 | The Bastard from the Bush (double bill with Borderland) | | Arts Centre ANU, Seymour Centre, Playhouse Newcastle and International tour |
| 1984 | Medea | | Arts Centre Melbourne, Playhouse Melbourne |
| 1985 | The Dance of Death | | Wharf Theatre |
| 1986 | Hamlet & The Marriage | | Sydney Opera House |
| 1987 | A Chorus of Disapproval | | Playhouse Melbourne, Canberra Theatre |
| 1988 | Faces in the Street | | Seymour Centre |
| 1991 | Racing Demon | | Wharf Theatre |
| 1991 | Hay Fever | | Playhouse Melbourne |
| 1991 | Beastly Tales from Here and There | | Open Secret (Ramsay’s chamber theatre company) |
| 1994 | The Bastard from the Bush | | Fairfax Studio Melbourne, Seymour Centre |
| 1995 | The Accidental Mystic | Solo play | Open Secret at Ensemble Theatre, Theatre 3 Acton, Malthouse Theatre, Lion Theatre Adelaide, Seymour Centre, Edinburgh Festival, Malthouse Theatre, London and India |
| 1995 | The Head of Mary | | The Small Theatre – Tokyo International Arts Space and Malthouse Theatre |
| 1996 | Heretic | Derek Freeman | Sydney Opera House, Subiaco Theatre Centre, Canberra Theatre, Bunbury Regional Entertainment Centre, Goldfields Arts Centre Kalgoorlie and Playhouse Melbourne |
| 2003–2006 | Borderland | | Open Secret at Lord Mayor of London's India Now celebrations, London |
