= Melba (miniseries) =

- Written by: Roger McDonald
- Directed by: Rodney Fisher
- Starring: Linda Cropper; Hugo Weaving; Googie Withers
- Country of origin: Australia
- Original language: English
- No. of episodes: 4 x 2 hours

Production
- Producers: Errol Sullivan; Pom Oliver
- Running time: 248 mins
- Budget: $8 million

Original release
- Network: Seven Network
- Release: 22 March 1988

Melba is a 1988 Australian miniseries about opera soprano Nellie Melba.

== Cast ==
- Linda Cropper as Nellie Melba
- Hugo Weaving as Charles Armstrong
- Peter Carroll as David Mitchell
- Googie Withers as Lady Armstrong
- Joan Greenwood as Madame Marchesi
- Jean-Pierre Aumont as Comte de Paris
- Maria Aitken as Gladys de Grey
- Tom Burlinson as Sid Meredith
- Noel Ferrier as J. C. Williamson
- Nell Schofield as Belle Patterson
- Simon Burke as John McCormack
- Dorothy Alison as Elizabeth Mitchell
- Judi Farr as Amy Davidson
- Helmut Bakaitis as John Lemmone
- Christopher Benjamin as Colonel Otway
- Mel Martin as Mrs. Otway
- Lyndel Rowe as Blanche Marchesi
- Tamsin Carroll as Dora Mitchell
- Vanessa Downing as Evie Doyle
- Arianthe Galani as Melika
- Philippe Caroit as the Duc d'Orleans
