= The Mystery at Castle House =

Mystery at Castle House
- Directed by: Peter Maxwell
- Starring: Aileen Britton; Henri Szeps; Simone Buchanan; Ray Meagher
- Release date: 1982
- Country: Australia
- Language: English

Mystery at Castle House is a 1982 Australian film for children. The film was broadcast in the United Kingdom on the ITV network in 1986.

== Plot ==
With their father tied up with a long-term business contract, siblings Kate and Ben move in with their aunt. As they explore their new surroundings, they meet and befriend a local boy named Spider. They also encounter Rocco and Ah Leong, who are stealing produce from the shops and households.

Kate, Ben and Spider eventually decide to explore Castle House, a mysterious huge manor that has been abandoned for 15 years. However, they soon discover that the house has inhabitants: An old lady named Miss Markham, to whose family the house belongs; her new ground caretaker Mr. Wilberforce; and his two dimwitted aides Morris and Stakovich. While Miss Markham proves very friendly, Wilberforce and his men strive to keep the children away from the grounds. After the children's visit, Miss Markham discovers that Wilberforce and his men are keeping her own cellar locked up; and when she decides to investigate, the men overpower her and tie her up.

On their way back to the house's jetty, Ben, Kate and Spider discover a secret tunnel to the house, and in it they run into Rocco and Ah Leong. As the two boys disclose, Ah Leong's father was kidnapped by Wilberforce and his goons to help them in a break-in, since he is supposed to disable the security system, and is kept captive in Castle House's cellar. The children try to free Mr. Leong, but only succeed in alerting Wilberforce about their knowledge of his scheme, and with the robbery about to take place this very day, the gangsters decide to speed up their plans. The children do what they can to slow down Wilberforce's plans, and manage to free Miss Markham. Using a rented high-power speedboat, the children and Miss Markham catch up with the gangsters, overpower them and free Mr. Leong.

== Cast ==
- Simone Buchanan as Kate
- Jeremy Shadlow as Spider
- Scott Nicholas as Ben
- Aileen Britton as Miss Markham
- Henri Szeps as Mr. Wilberforce
- John Cobley as Morris
- Ray Meagher as Stakovich
- Robert Geammel as Rocco
- Tony Lee as Ah Leong
- Ron Mee Lee as (Ah Leong's) Father
- Robin Bowering as Mr. Gaspari, Rocco's father
- Carole Skinner as Aunt Josephine

== Production ==
It was one of a series of children's dramas produced by Independent Productions.

== Release ==
Mystery at Castle House, like others produced by Independent Productions sold overseas and had been available on video for over two years before making it to television in December 1984. Earlier that year it had a special holiday season run in Melbourne cinemas in May.

== Reception ==
Jill Morris of The Age said "In short, as school-holiday-Sunday-night, viewing entertainment, Mystery At Castle House is not to be missed." The Sydney Morning Herald's David Frith notes that it, along with Run, Rebecca, Run, are "rattling good adventure yarns, well scripted, acted and photographed against an Australian setting." Mike Jackson in The Canberra Times says "It's a great combination, plenty of fun and action - Great holiday viewing in fact."
