= The Odyssey (1987 film) =

- Film poster
- Directed by: Warwick Gilbert; Geoff Collins
- Written by: Homer (original work); Paul Leadon (screenplay); Alex Nicholas (adaptation)
- Based on: Odyssey by Homer
- Produced by: Roz Phillips
- Starring: Tim Elliott; John Ewart; Ron Haddrick; Paul Johnstone; Juliet Jordan; Barry Langrishe; Jennifer Mellet
- Edited by: Peter Jennings; Gary O'Grady
- Music by: Simon Walker
- Production company: Burbank Films Australia
- Release date: 19 November 1987
- Running time: 55 minutes
- Country: Australia
- Language: English

The Odyssey is a 1987 Australian animated adventure film directed by Warwick Gilbert and Geoff Collins and produced by Burbank Films Australia. Based on Homer's epic poem, Odyssey, the film follows the Greek hero Odysseus as he attempts to return home to Ithaca after the Trojan War, encountering numerous mythical creatures and divine obstacles along the way. A sword-and-sandal fantasy, the straight to video film was produced by Roz Phillips and released on 19 November 1987.

== Plot ==
Following the end of the Trojan War, Odysseus embarks on his long voyage home to Ithaca. Along the way he confronts the Cyclops, the enchantress Circe, the Sirens, Scylla and Charybdis, and other perils while the god Poseidon seeks to prevent his return. The film's ending differs significantly from Homer's Odyssey. The film reimagines the relationship of Odysseus and Penelope by having the couple first meet each other after the former washes ashore in the third act, echoing his encounter with Nausicaä in the Odyssey. Its climax instead draws on the myth of Perseus and Andromeda: rather than returning to Ithaca to find Penelope besieged by the suitors competing for her hand in marriage, Odysseus rescues her from becoming a sacrifice to Poseidon at the seashore, after which the pair marry offscreen before returning to Ithaca.

== Voice cast ==
- Tim Eliott
- John Ewart
- Ron Haddrick
- Paul Johnstone
- Juliet Jordan
- Barry Langrishe
- Jennifer Mellet

== Production ==
The film was produced by Burbank Films Australia, with Roz Phillips serving as producer. It was adapted from Homer's Odyssey by Alex Nicholas, with a screenplay by Paul Leadon. The music was composed by Simon Walker. The film features an all-Australian voice cast, whose performances employ British accents to reflect the story's ancient Greek setting.

== Release ==
The Odyssey premiered in Australia on 19 November 1987 as part of Burbank Films Australia's series of animated adaptations of classic literature. It has a runtime of approximately 55 minutes and was later released on home video. A digitally restored and remastered high-definition version of the film was released in 2022 and has since been made available through digital platforms such as Apple TV and Amazon Prime Video.

== See also ==
- Odyssey
- Burbank Films Australia
