= Burbank Animation Studios =

Australian film animation production company

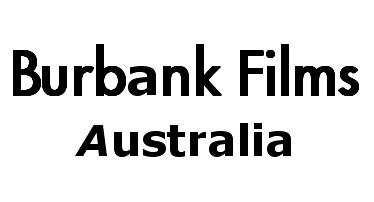
- Formerly: Burbank Films Australia (1982-1989)
- Industry: Film animation studios
- Founded: 1982; 44 years ago
- Defunct: 2008; 18 years ago
- Headquarters: Sydney, New South Wales, Australia
- Website: burbankanimation.com

Burbank Animation Studios was an Australian film animation production company, formerly named Burbank Films Australia.

== History ==
The company's first animated productions in 1982 were a series of adaptations of books from Charles Dickens; these first few films characterized themselves by their grim appeal. The sketch-styled backgrounds and the simplicity of the original score, such as in Oliver Twist (1982), added to the dramatic tone of those first stories. The eight total Dickens adaptations were produced during two years.

At the same time in 1983, the company produced a short series of adaptations of Sherlock Holmes stories, adapted from the works of Sir Arthur Conan Doyle. In the years that followed, until 1988, Burbank adapted the works of many other well-known authors and legends, including Kenneth Grahame's The Wind in the Willows, Miguel de Cervantes' Don Quixote, J. M. Barrie's Peter Pan, Lewis Carroll's Alice's Adventures in Wonderland and Alexandre Dumas' The Three Musketeers among many others.

By 1987, the animation was entirely made in Philippines (Burbank Animation Incorporated based in Manila).

In 1991, the company was resurrected under the name of Burbank Animation Studios. The new studio continued the production of "animated classics" in association with Anchor Bay Entertainment and Bridgestar Entertainment. David Field as managing director and executive producer and Roz Phillips as producer.

From 1991 to 1994, Burbank Animation Studios utilized the newly formed Sydney studio's Unlimited Energee as its production facility. The shows were traditionally drawn but then digitally inked, painted, and composited to first Betamax and then Ampex cartridge recording systems, which allowed for some unusually detailed backgrounds, various digital FX, and infrequent 3D (sparingly used due to low budgets). In 1994, Burbank Animation Studios chose to switch production facilities to Colorland Studios of China.

== Filmography ==
=== Burbank Films Australia ===
- Oliver Twist (15 December 1982)
- A Christmas Carol (22 December 1982)
- Sherlock Holmes and the Sign of Four (13 January 1983)
- Sherlock Holmes and the Valley of Fear (14 January 1983)
- Sherlock Holmes and a Study in Scarlet (15 January 1983)
- Sherlock Holmes and the Baskerville Curse (16 January 1983)
- Great Expectations (31 March 1983)
- David Copperfield (20 July 1983)
- The Old Curiosity Shop (17 February 1984)
- A Tale of Two Cities (8 June 1984)
- Nicholas Nickleby (16 March 1985)
- The Pickwick Papers (26 March 1985)
- The Adventures of Robin Hood (13 July 1985)
- The Man in the Iron Mask (26 July 1985)
- 20,000 Leagues Under the Sea (17 December 1985)
- King Solomon's Mines (1986)
- The Adventures of Tom Sawyer (1986)
- Kidnapped (21 June 1986)
- Dr. Jekyll and Mr. Hyde (10 July 1986)
- Ivanhoe (14 September 1986)
- The Three Musketeers (4 October 1986)
- The Hunchback of Notre Dame (21 December 1986)
- Don Quixote of La Mancha (1 January 1987)
- Rob Roy (1987)
- Alice Through the Looking Glass (15 May 1987)
- Black Beauty (19 June 1987)
- The Last of the Mohicans (31 July 1987)
- The Odyssey (19 November 1987)
- Treasure Island (25 December 1987)
- Black Tulip (10 February 1988)
- Westward Ho! (1 May 1988)
- Prisoner of Zenda (9 May 1988)
- Hiawatha (15 June 1988)
- Peter Pan (23 June 1988)
- Alice in Wonderland (10 July 1988)
- The Black Arrow (18 October 1988)
- Around the World in 80 Days (25 November 1988)
- Wind in the Willows (13 December 1988)
- The Corsican Brothers (7 July 1989)

=== Burbank Animation Studios ===
- White Fang (1991)
- The Emperor's New Clothes (1991)
- The Count of Monte-Cristo (1991)
- Hans and the Silver Skates (1991)
- Goldilocks and the Three Bears (1991)
- Frank Enstein (1991)
- Ali Baba (1991)
- The New Adventures of Robin Hood (1992)
- The Pied Piper of Hamlin (1992)
- The New Adventures of William Tell (1992)
- Thumbelina (1993)
- The Fantastic Voyages of Sinbad (1993)
- Puss in Boots (1993)
- Pocahontas (1995)
- Cinderella (1996)
- Beauty and the Beast (1996)
- The Hunchback of Notre Dame (1996)
- Hansel and Gretel (1997)
- Hercules (1997)
- Anastasia (1997)
- The Little Mermaid (1998)
- Camelot (1998)
- Mulan (1998)
- Prince of the Nile: The Story of Moses (1998)
- The Three Little Pigs (1999)
- D4: The Trojan Dog (1999)
- Easter in Bunnyland (1999)
- Anna and the King (1999)
- Silent Night: The Story of the First Christmas (2000)
- The Canterville Ghost (2001)
- Joseph and the Coat of Many Colours (2001)
- The Little Drummer Boy (2001)
- Jungle Girl and the Lost Island of the Dinosaurs (2002)

== TV series ==
- The Wizard's Tales (1991-2001)

== Copyright status ==
There has been much confusion as to whether ownership of these films has fallen into the public domain. Despite the number of releases of these films, every Burbank film has a valid United States copyright and cannot be considered an orphaned work or public domain. Burbank's catalogue is an example of the type of budget copyright content regularly parallel licensed to multiple home video distributors.

When Burbank's parent company Film Funding & Management went into liquidation, the distribution rights to the "Animated Classics" were transferred to ABR Entertainment and the copyright was later fully assigned to Omnivision. These are now owned by Pulse Distribution and Entertainment and administered by digital rights management firm NuTech Digital. These titles are currently available in the US on NuTech's Digital Versatile Disc (DVD), Ltd. label. They have also been licensed to Genius Entertainment.

Budget-priced releases from Digiview Entertainment have also been sighted, but their legality is unknown.

The distribution rights to "The Dickens Collection" (A Christmas Carol, Oliver Twist, David Copperfield, Great Expectations, A Tale of Two Cities, The Old Curiosity Shop, Nicholas Nickleby and The Pickwick Papers), "The Sherlock Holmes Collection" (A Study in Scarlet, The Baskerville Curse, The Sign of Four and The Valley of Fear), Black Tulip and The Corsican Brothers were transferred to Rikini, which later became International Family Classics (IFC), who onsold the films to H.S. Holding Corporation who currently own the titles. Alice Through the Looking Glass is now also owned by H.S. who purchased the rights from INI Entertainment Group, the distributor of Burbank Animation Studios' post-1991 films. These titles are currently distributed by Liberty International Publishing in the US, through Liberation Entertainment and Genius Entertainment.

As with the "Animated Classics", budget-priced releases from Digiview have been sighted, but again, their legality is unknown.

Payless Entertainment, an Australian distributor, began reissuing the Burbank catalogue in 2008.

Production credits for the Burbank Animation Studios shows vary. Some distributors, including INI, retain the original complete credits (blue pages at end of story describing entire production crew). Other distributors have trimmed production credits so that for the producing studio, only the animation director, primary producer and administration staff remain.

== See also ==
- List of animation companies
