= Henri Szeps =

Australian actor and comedian (1943–2025)

Henri Szeps OAM
- Born: 2 October 1943; Lausanne, Switzerland
- Died: 23 July 2025 (aged 81)
- Education: University of Sydney
- Occupations: Actor; composer; playwright; performer; advisor; translator
- Years active: 1962–2025
- Organisation: Ensemble Theatre
- Known for: Mother and Son, Palace of Dreams, I'm Not a Dentist
- Spouse: Mary Ann Severne (m. 1969)
- Children: 2, including Josh Szeps
- Awards: Helpmann Award; Norman Kessell Award for Outstanding Performance; Penguin Award for Best Actor in a mini-series; GLUGS Lifetime Achievement Award

Henri Szeps OAM (/hɛnri zɛps/) (2 October 1943 – 23 July 2025), also spelt Henry Szeps, was an Australian character actor of theatre and television. He also featured in films and worked in voice roles, and worked in productions in the United Kingdom. He was best known for his role as "Robert the Dentist" in the original version of ABC sitcom Mother and Son, and in theatre for his performances in many plays by David Williamson. In 2003 he won a Helpmann Award for Best Male Actor in a Supporting Role in a Musical, for his performance in Cabaret, and earned other awards and honours for his acting.

== Early life and education ==
Henri Szeps was born on 2 October 1943 in a refugee camp in Lausanne, Switzerland, to Polish parents who were Holocaust survivors. Prior to the German invasion of Poland during World War II, his parents fled to France in 1938. His father left the family to join the French Resistance. In 1943, his mother Rose and three-year-old sister Maria made their way to a refugee camp in Lausanne, where Henri was born. In September 1944, having watched babies in the camp become ill, Henri's mother had him fostered out to a German-speaking Swiss couple in Blumenstein at 1 1/2 months old. In 1946, his mother who had relocated to Paris, reclaimed him when he was three years old, but he returned to the Swiss couple in 1948 when he was 4 1/2, as he could not speak Polish or French and found it hard to communicate with his mother. He was reclaimed by his mother again in 1949, but due to her illness, at the age of six was placed at the Rothschild Orphanage, St Denis, outside Paris.

Szeps came to Sydney, Australia, at the age of eight in 1951 or 1952 with his mother and sister. From 1952, his stepfather Maurice joined then from Paris. His mother worked as a tailor and his stepfather as a presser. They later bought a grocery shop in Surry Hills.

Szeps started attending Greenwich Primary School, where he appeared in numerous school plays. Starting in 1956, he attended North Sydney Technical High School for 9 months, followed by Randwick Boys High School. From 1959 to 1960 he performed in school productions of The Teahouse of the August Moon. He later said that although some of the children laughed at his "foreign ways", he received recognition from his performances, which made him realise that he wanted to act.

In 1962 Szeps studied acting at the Ensemble Theatre during weekends, while gaining science and electrical engineering degrees at Sydney University. His training at Ensemble included training in the Stanislavski technique ("the Method") – under founding artistic director Hayes Gordon. He began working as a research assistant after graduating, and was offered a postgraduate scholarship at the age of 23 to continue his studies, but he declined it in favour of continuing his acting career.

== Career ==
In 1963, while still undergoing his studies, Szeps appeared every night at the Ensemble Theatre, in a play called The Physicists, which ran for six months. He also performed in George Bernard Shaw's The Apple Cart, and Woody Allen's Don't Drink The Water.

His early screen credits include police procedural drama series Homicide, children's series Skippy the Bush Kangaroo and adventure series Riptide as well as the film You Can't See 'Round Corners. In 1968, he starred in a successful stage production of Mart Crowley's The Boys in the Band, where, during the Sydney season, he met his wife-to-be, NIDA graduate and actress Mary Ann Severne, who had come to watch fellow NIDA friends performing in the play.

Disillusioned by the Australian acting scene, Szeps relocated to England in 1971 together with Severne, to hone his acting skills. He initially performed in a production of Shakespeare's Measure for Measure by director Peter Cheeseman, before starring in I, Claudius opposite David Warner, one of the most influential actors at the time. He then toured the UK, the Middle East and the Mediterranean in a Prospect Theatre Company tour of several plays, alongside Derek Jacobi. He also had guest roles in several British television series, including The Rivals of Sherlock Holmes, Spyder's Web, Spy Trap, The Strauss Family, Colditz, Crown Court, and Dixon of Dock Green.

Szeps returned to Australia in 1974. He played the recurring role of Phillip Chambers in Number 96 in 1976. He then appeared in the TV movies Say You Want Me (1977), Ride on Stranger (1979), The Plumber (1979), A Toast to Melba (1980) and A Step in the Right Direction (1981). Guest roles followed in series such as Chopper Squad, Cop Shop, Kingswood Country, and A Country Practice, City West and Carson's Law. He also performed voiceover work in a number of animated children's classics, including Sherlock Holmes and the Valley of Fear, Sherlock Holmes and a Study in Scarlet, and A Tale of Two Cities.

From 1984 to 1994, Szeps played his best known role of selfish dentist Robert Beare, the older son, in the classic Australian television comedy series Mother and Son, with Garry McDonald, Ruth Cracknell, and Judy Morris. Another prominent role was in ABC Television's 10-part series Palace of Dreams in 1985. He then played ill-fated prime minister Harold Holt in the 1987 miniseries Vietnam, alongside Nicole Kidman. He was also selected by Barry Humphries' to play down-on-his-luck scientist, Charles Herpes, in Humphries' 1987 film Les Patterson Saves the World.

He had a guest role in the 1988 American series Mission: Impossible, and further guest roles in the drama series Rafferty's Rules, medical series G.P., All Saints, period adventure drama Snowy River: The McGregor Saga, and police procedural series Stingers.

Szeps also continued to work extensively in theatre, and collaborated for years with playwright David Williamson. He had roles in many of Williamson's plays, including Celluloid Heroes, Dead White Males and Heretic. He played the doctor in the world première of Williamson's Travelling North, and was asked to reprise the role in the 1987 film version with Leo McKern and Graham Kennedy.

He performed in five one-man shows, produced by the Ensemble Theatre: two written for him by John Misto (The Double Bass (1990) and Sky (1992)), and three that he wrote himself: I'm Not a Dentist (1997), Why Kids (2003), and Wish I'd Said That (2010).

In 2002 he played Herr Schultz in a production of Cabaret, which earned him a Helpmann Award.

His final acting role was in the 2015 biographical television miniseries Peter Allen: Not the Boy Next Door, playing Dee Anthony.

== Book ==
Szeps also wrote a book on acting, All in Good Timing: A Personal Account of What an Actor Does (1996), which is used as a reference by drama schools.

== Personal life and death ==
Szeps met fellow actress Mary Ann Severne while touring in the Sydney run of the play The Boys in the Band. They married on 28 June 1969, and had two sons together, Amos Szeps and podcaster Josh Szeps.

Szeps spoke three languages fluently.

In 2021, he openly discussed his struggles with early onset dementia on the ABC TV series Just Between Us, alongside son Josh. He moved into a care facility in 2023.

Szeps died from complications of Alzheimer's disease on 23 July 2025, at the age of 81.

== Honours and awards ==
Szeps was awarded a Medal of the Order of Australia (OAM) in the 2001 Australia Day Honours, "For service to the arts, and to the community through the Australia Day Council and the National Centre for Childhood Grief"

Acting awards and honours include:

| Year | Association | Award | Work | Results |
|---|---|---|---|---|
| 1985 | Penguin Award | Best Actor in a mini-series | Palace of Dreams | Won |
| 1997 | Norman Kessell Award | Outstanding Performance | I'm Not a Dentist | Won |
| 2003 | Helpmann Award | Best Male Actor in a Supporting Role in a Musical | Cabaret | Won |
| 2014 | Ensemble Theatre | The Henri Szeps Green Room | | Honoured |
| 2015 | Glugs Awards | Lifetime Achievement Award | | Honoured |

== Filmography ==
=== Film ===
| Year | Title | Role | Type |
|---|---|---|---|
| 1969 | You Can't See 'round Corners | Peter | Feature film |
| 1976 | God Knows Why, But It Works | Dr. Archie Kalokerinos | Film |
| 1980 | Fatty Finn | Mr. Zilch | Feature film |
| 1981 | Run, Rebecca, Run | Manuel Cortes | Feature film |
| 1982 | The Best of Friends | Lilo | Feature film |
| 1982 | The Mystery at Castle House | Mr. Wilberforce | Feature film |
| 1983 | The Return of Captain Invincible | Chief Security Officer | Feature film |
| 1983 | Now and Forever | Barry York | Feature film |
| 1983 | Platypus Cove | Winston Bell | Feature film |
| 1985 | Warming Up | Sergeant Peter Sullivan | Feature film |
| 1987 | Les Patterson Saves the World | Dr. Charles Herpes / Desiree Herpes | Feature film |
| 1987 | Travelling North | Saul | Feature film |
| 1987 | The Edge of Power | Steve Traynor | Feature film |
| 1992 | Seeing Red | Louie Leeds | Feature film |
| 2001 | Elixir | Bob Sommerville | Feature film |
| 2009 | No Junk Mail | | Short film |
| 2010 | The Bris | Dobinski | Short film |
| 2012 | Bathing Franky | Rodney | Feature film |
| 2013 | McLean's Money | Edward McLean | Film |

=== Television ===
| Year | Title | Role | Type |
|---|---|---|---|
| 1967; 1969 | Homicide | Peter Scott / Alan Shaw / David Yates | 3 episodes |
| 1969 | Skippy the Bush Kangaroo | Bob | 1 episode |
| 1969 | Riptide | Des Dawkins | 1 episode |
| 1969–1975 | Division 4 | Jeff Taylor / Brian Martin / Jimmy Dunn | 3 episodes |
| 1971 | Misleading Cases | Pierre | 1 episode |
| 1971 | Spyforce | Dingo | 1 episode |
| 1971 | The Rivals of Sherlock Holmes | Laval | 1 episode |
| 1972 | Spyder's Web | Policeman | 1 episode |
| 1972 | Spy Trap | The Frenchman | 1 episode |
| 1972 | The Strauss Family | Edi's Dresser | Miniseries, 1 episode |
| 1973; 1974 | Colditz | De Crossait / Captain Henry LeVevre | 2 episodes |
| 1974 | Barlow | Corsican | 1 episode |
| 1974 | Crown Court | Dr. Herman Abel | 2 episodes |
| 1974 | Armchair Cinema | | Episode 6: "Tully" |
| 1975 | Dixon of Dock Green | Onion Man | 1 episode |
| 1976 | Number 96 | Phillip Chambers | 21 episodes |
| 1976 | Do I Have to Kill My Child? | Doctor | TV movie |
| 1977 | The Dick Emery Show in Australia | Various characters | |
| 1977 | Say You Want Me | Jim Morton | TV movie |
| 1978 | Chopper Squad | Falconio | 1 episode |
| 1978–1981 | Cop Shop | Steven Halliday / Vincent Morelli | 5 episodes |
| 1979 | The Plumber | David Medavoy | TV movie |
| 1979 | Ride on Stranger | Vincent Sladder | 4 episodes |
| 1980 | A Toast to Melba | Thomas Beecham / Buffalo Bill / Mayor of Brisbane | TV movie |
| 1980; 1984 | Kingswood Country | Mr O'Grady / Eric the Postman | 2 episodes |
| 1981 | A Step in the Right Direction | | TV movie |
| 1981 | Daily at Dawn | Joe Parker | TV series |
| 1982 | Wilde's Domain | Shenko | TV movie |
| 1982 | Home Sweet Home | Franco | 1 episode |
| 1982 | MPSIB | Tran Van | |
| 1982–1983 | A Country Practice | Perc Hobbs / Ralph Bianchi | 6 episodes |
| 1983 | Sherlock Holmes and the Valley of Fear | Voice | Animated TV movie |
| 1983 | Sherlock Holmes and a Study in Scarlet | Voice | Animated TV movie |
| 1984 | The Girl From Moonooloo | Bert | TV movie |
| 1984 | A Tale of Two Cities | Voice | Animated TV movie |
| 1984 | City West | Dr. Mikus Kuskis | 7 episodes |
| 1984 | Carson's Law | Wally Martin | 2 episodes |
| 1984–1994 | Mother and Son | Robert Beare | 38 episodes |
| 1985 | Pickwick Papers | Voice | Animated TV movie |
| 1985 | Palace of Dreams | Mick Mendel | Miniseries, 10 episodes |
| 1987 | Vietnam | Harold Holt | Miniseries, 3 episodes |
| 1988 | Rafferty's Rules | Uncle Aniello | 2 episodes |
| 1989 | Hannay | Police Inspector | 1 episode |
| 1990 | Mission: Impossible | Esteban Magdalena | 1 episode |
| 1991 | Hampton Court | Mr. Verstak | 1 episode |
| 1991; 1995 | G.P. | Charlie Cassidy / Ibram Hanaf | 2 episodes |
| 1992 | The Adventures of Skippy | Frank | 1 episode |
| 1996 | Snowy River: The McGregor Saga | Jacob Verkovic | 1 episode |
| 1999; 2009 | All Saints | George Bresnic / Victor McGregor | 3 episodes |
| 2000 | Stingers | Norman Sagar | 1 episode |
| 2001 | Flat Chat | Cardinal Del Gardia | 1 episode |
| 2001 | South Pacific | Benoit | TV movie |
| 2001 | Escape of the Artful Dodger | Dr. Hartman | 3 episodes |
| 2015 | Peter Allen: Not the Boy Next Door | Dee Anthony | Miniseries, 2 episodes |

== Stage ==
Szeps' numerous appearances on stage and behind the scenes include:

=== As actor ===
| Year | Title | Role | Type |
|---|---|---|---|
| 1962 | Cecile and the Bespoke Overcoat | Cecile | University of Sydney |
| 1963 | The Physicists | | Ensemble Theatre, Sydney |
| | Paint Your Wagon | | Arts council tour |
| 1964 | An Entertainment: The Canterville Ghost / A Programme of Folk Song | | Ensemble Theatre, Sydney |
| 1966 | The Death of Bessie Smith | | Ensemble Theatre, Sydney |
| 1966 | The Apple Cart | | Ensemble Theatre, Sydney |
| 1968 | Don't Drink the Water | Axel Magee | Independent Theatre, Sydney |
| 1968–1970 | The Boys in the Band | Harold | Australian tour with Harry M. Miller |
| 1970 | When We Are Married | | Phillip St Theatre, Sydney |
| 1970 | Alice in Wonderland | | Phillip St Theatre, Sydney |
| 1971 | Measure for Measure | | Stoke-on-Trent |
| 1972 | I, Claudius | | Queens Theatre, London |
| 1972–1973 | The Royal Hunt of the Sun | | The Old Vic UK tour |
| 1972–1973 | Twelfth Night | | The Old Vic UK tour |
| 1972–1973 | Mother Goose | Demon Discontent | Theatre Royal, Windsor with Windsor Theatre Company |
| 1963–1974 | Pericles | Fisherman 1 | Nottingham Playhouse, Theatre Royal, Bury St Edmunds, Lyceum Theatre, Edinburgh, Middle East & Mediterranean tour, Oxford Playhouse, Her Majesty's Theatre, London with Prospect Theatre Company |
| 1974–1975 | Savages | | Ensemble Theatre, Sydney, Theatre Royal, Hobart |
| 1975 | The Good Doctor | | Ensemble Theatre, Sydney, Playhouse, Canberra, Monash University, Melbourne |
| 1976 | The Beast of Belgrave Square | Gilbert Mortlock | Neutral Bay Music Hall, Sydney |
| 1977 | Funny Peculiar | Desmond Ainsley | Theatre Royal Sydney, Comedy Theatre, Melbourne with J. C. Williamson's |
| 1977 | The Prisoner of Second Avenue | Harry Edison | Ensemble Theatre, Sydney |
| 1978 | The Comedy of Errors | Egeon / Balthasar | Nimrod, Sydney |
| 1978 | Gone with Hardy | Jock McTavish | Nimrod, Sydney |
| 1979 | Tribute | Lou Daniels | Theatre Royal Sydney, Newcastle Civic Theatre |
| 1979 | Travelling North | Saul | Nimrod, Sydney, Melbourne Athenaeum |
| 1980 | The Death of Bessie Smith | | Ensemble Theatre, Sydney |
| 1980 | Sexual Perversity in Chicago / Reunion | Bernie | Nimrod, Sydney |
| 1980 | Reunion | Bernie | Nimrod, Sydney |
| 1980 | A Little Brown Hairy Eye | One-man show | Nimrod, Sydney, Ensemble Theatre, Sydney |
| 1980–1981 | Celluloid Heroes | Gary Brady | Nimrod, Sydney, Theatre Royal Sydney |
| 1982 | Oklahoma! | Ali Hakim | Festival Theatre, Adelaide, Theatre Royal, Sydney, Her Majesty's Theatre, Melbourne |
| 1984 | Stage Struck | | Marian St Theatre, Sydney |
| 1984 | Two | | Marian St Theatre, Sydney |
| 1984 | The Prisoner of Second Avenue | | Ensemble Theatre, Sydney |
| 1985 | The Resistible Rise of Arturo Ui | | Seymour Centre, Sydney |
| 1986 | Glengarry Glen Ross | | Sydney Opera House, London |
| 1987 | Hamlet / Henry IV, Part 1 | | Sydney Theatre Company |
| 1987 | Shepherd on the Rocks | Dean Bartholomew Shute / Ern / Nat Wormald | Playhouse, Adelaide with STCSA |
| 1988 | Rough Crossing | Alex Gal | Playhouse, Adelaide, Sydney Opera House, Playhouse, Canberra with STCSA & Gary Penny Productions |
| 1989 | Speed-the-Plow | | Space Theatre, Adelaide with STCSA |
| 1989 | The Price | | Ensemble Theatre, Sydney |
| 1989 | Just Between Ourselves | | Ensemble Theatre, Sydney |
| 1990–1991; 1993 | The Double Bass | One-man show | Ensemble Theatre, Sydney, Playhouse, Perth, Fairfax Studio, Melbourne, Glen St Theatre, Sydney |
| 1992 | Same Time, Next Year | | Glen St Theatre, Sydney, Playhouse, Perth |
| 1992 | Sky | Rococo Betoni (One-man show) | Ensemble Theatre, Sydney, Universal Theatre, Melbourne, Playhouse, Perth, Glen St Theatre, Sydney, Q Theatre, Penrith |
| 1994 | Three Hotels | | Ensemble Theatre, Sydney |
| 1995 | Dead White Males | Martin Judd | Sydney Opera House, Glen St Theatre, Sydney, Playhouse, Melbourne, His Majesty's Theatre, Perth with STC & MTC |
| 1995–1998 | I'm Not a Dentist | One-man show | Australian tour |
| 1996 | Heretic | Rick Cooper | Australian tour with STC & MTC |
| 1997 | After-Play | | Marian St Theatre, Sydney with Northside Theatre Company |
| 1998 | The Sunshine Boys | | Ensemble Theatre, Sydney |
| 1999–2000 | The Hobbit | Gandalf | Australian tour with Anketell Theatre Productions |
| 2001 | The Price | | Ensemble Theatre, Sydney |
| 2002 | After the Ball | | Ensemble Theatre, Sydney, Theatre Royal Sydney |
| 2002–2003 | Cabaret | Herr Schultz | Australian tour with IMG Productions |
| 2003; 2006 | Why Kids | One-man show | Australian tour |
| 2004 | Twelve Angry Men | Juror 9 | Playhouse, Brisbane, Sydney Theatre, Melbourne Athenaeum with Adrian Bohm Presents |
| 2005 | Operator | Douglas | Ensemble Theatre, Sydney |
| 2005 | President Wilson in Paris | President Wilson | Australian tour with HIT Productions |
| 2005 | Love Letters | Andrew Makepeace III | NIDA Parade Theatre, Sydney |
| 2006 | Charitable Intent | Brian | Ensemble Theatre, Sydney |
| 2007; 2010 | Halpern & Johnson | Halpern | Ensemble Theatre, Sydney, Casula Powerhouse |
| 2008 | QED | Feynman | Ensemble Theatre, Sydney |
| 2008 | Codgers | | Glen Street Theatre, Sydney & Australian regional tour |
| 2010–2011 | Wish I'd Said That | Joe Bleakley (one-man show) | Ensemble Theatre, Sydney, The Street Theatre, Canberra |
| 2011 | Four Flat Whites in Italy | Harry | Ensemble Theatre, Sydney, The Street Theatre, Canberra |
| 2013 | It's My Party (and I'll Die if I Want To) | Ron Patterson | Lennox Theatre, Parramatta with HIT Productions |
| 2013 | Freud's Last Session | Freud | Theatre Royal Sydney |
| 2014 | Cruise Control | Sol Wasserman | Ensemble Theatre, Sydney |

=== As playwright / director / crew ===
| Year | Title | Role | Type |
|---|---|---|---|
| 1975 | The Good Doctor | Composer | Ensemble Theatre, Sydney, Playhouse, Canberra, Monash University, Melbourne |
| 1980 | A Little Brown Hairy Eye | Playwright | Nimrod, Sydney, Ensemble Theatre, Sydney |
| 1990–1991; 1993 | The Double Bass | Translator | Ensemble Theatre, Sydney, Playhouse, Perth, Fairfax Studio, Melbourne, Glen St Theatre, Sydney |
| 1995–1998 | I'm Not a Dentist | Playwright / Director | Hakoah Club, Bondi, Effie Crump Theatre, Perth, Ensemble Theatre, Sydney, Monash University, Melbourne |
| 2003; 2006 | Why Kids | Playwright / Devisor | Australian tour |
| 2010 | Wish I'd Said That | Playwright | Ensemble Theatre, Sydney |
