= Linda Cropper =

Australian actress

- Occupation: Actress
- Known for: Offspring

Linda Cropper is an Australian actress. She played Dame Nellie Melba in the 1987 television series Melba, becoming more widely known for her role as Geraldine Proudman in the TV series Offspring (2010-2017). She has featured in many other TV series and also has several film credits. She played a lead role in the 2025 dark comedy satire film Birthright.

== Career ==
=== Television ===
Cropper played Nellie Melba in the 1987 television series Melba.

Other television credits include roles in ABC miniseries Palace of Dreams, Edens Lost, Ring of Scorpio, Bordertown, Wildside, Water Rats, All Saints, White Collar Blue, and The Pacific. She had a recurring role as Xhalax Sun during the third season of the Australian-American science fiction series Farscape.

In 2024 she played Rose de Vigny over eight episodes in the mystery drama series High Country.

=== Film ===
Cropper's film credits include Teesh and Trude (2002), Little Fish (2005) and Fool's Gold (2008).

She played a lead role as Lyn (the mother) in Australian filmmaker Zoe Pepper's feature film directorial debut Birthright, a dark comedy satire reflecting the contemporary Australian housing crisis and its generational inequity. The film premiered at the Tribeca Film Festival in New York City in June 2025.

=== Theatre ===
Cropper's many theatre credits include Simon Phillip's co-production of Poor Boy for the Melbourne Theatre Company and Sydney Theatre Company, and the role of Lady Macbeth in Bell Shakespeare's Macbeth. Other credits with Bell Shakespeare include Romeo and Juliet, Twelfth Night, As You Like It and Hamlet. Sydney Theatre Company credits include Arcadia, A Month in the Country, Top Girls, and Great Expectations. She played the solo role Melbourne Theatre Company's production of The Architect by Aidan Fennessy in 2018.

== Accolades ==
In 1989 Cropper was nominated for an AFI Award for Best Performance by an Actress in a Mini Series, for Edens Lost.

In 2010, she was nominated for an AFI Award for Best Guest or Supporting Actress in a Television Drama for her performance in Satisfaction.

She won the Green Room Award (Performer, Theatre Companies) in 2019 for her 2018 performance in The Architect.

== Filmography ==
=== Television ===
Year	Title	Role	Type	Ref
1980	Spring & Fall	C.E.S. Officer	Episode 1: 'Close Comfort'	
1984	Five Mile Creek	Tillie	1 episode	
1984	A Country Practice	Joy Walker	2 episodes	
1985	Palace of Dreams	Miriam Mendel	Miniseries, 10 episodes	
1986	Cyclone Tracy	Joycie	Miniseries, 3 episodes	
1987	Melba	Nellie Melba / Nellie Mitchell Armstrong 'Melba'	Miniseries, 8 episodes	
1988	Rafferty's Rules		1 episode	
1988	Mike Willesee's Australians	Lola Montez	Anthology series, episode 6: 'Lola Montez'	
1988	Spit MacPhee	Betty Arbuckle	Miniseries, 4 episodes	
1988	Edens Lost	Stevie	Miniseries, 4 episodes	
1989	Bodysurfer	Anthea	Miniseries, 2 episodes	
1990	Ring Of Scorpio	Marlene Walker	Miniseries, 3 episodes	
1990	The Private War of Lucinda Smith	Lucinda Smith	Miniseries, 2 episodes	
1992	Children of the Dragon	Monica	Miniseries, 2 episodes	
1992	Cluedo	Matilda Mayberry	1 episode	
1993	Review	Guest Presenter	1 episode	
1993	G.P.	Shelley	1 episode	
1995	Bordertown	Bev Stafford	Mniseries, 10 episodes	
1997	Return To Jupiter	Computer	13 episodes	
1998	Wildside	Carol Wilson	1 episode	
1999–2000	Water Rats	Charlie Driscoll	7 episodes	
2000–2001	Farscape	Xhalas Sun / Fento	5 episodes	
2002	All Saints	Anita Murphy	1 episode	
2002–2003	White Collar Blue	Fran Hoffman	TV pilot & 7 other episodes	
2004	Frank Hurley: The Man who Made History	Narrator (voice)	TV documentary	
2006	McLeod's Daughters	Trudi Webb	2 episodes	
2008	Connected: The Power of Six Degrees	Narrator (voice)	Film documentary	
2009	Fairweather Men	Narrator (voice)	TV documentary	
2010	The Pharaoh Who Conquered the Sea	Narrator (voice)	TV documentary	
2010	Satisfaction	Loretta Hawkes	1 episode	
2010	The Pacific	Mary Frank Sledge	Miniseries, 4 episodes	
2010–2017	Offspring	Geraldine Proudman	86 episodes	
2011	The Secret History of Eurovision	Narrator (voice)	TV special	
2011	Seduction in the City	Narrator	1 episode	
2012	Miss Fisher's Murder Mysteries	Veronique Sarcelle	1 episode	
2013	Redfern Now	Coroner	1 episode	
2014	Old School	Barb	1 episode	
2016	Howard on Menzies: Building Modern Australia	Narrator (voice)	Documentary series, 2 episodes	
2016	Rake	Ms Crown	2 episodes	
2017	The Leftovers	The Nun	2 episodes	
2018	Pine Gap	Dani Griffin	Miniseries, 2 episodes	
2020	How to Stay Married	Claire	1 episode	
2024	High Country	Rose de Vigny	8 episodes	
2025	All Her Fault	Esther	Miniseries, 8 episodes	
2026	Dear Life	Janet Dost	TV series	

=== Film ===
Year	Title	Role	Type
1986	Going Sane	Irene Carter	Feature film
1994	The Seventh Floor	Vivian	Feature film
1996	Little White Lies	Tessler	Feature film
1997	The Hostages	Wendy	TV film
1997	Sidewinder – Titanic Days	Dianne	Film short
1997	Blackrock	Diane	Feature film
1998	With or Without You	Audrey	Feature film
1999	Passion	Mrs. Lowery	Feature film
1999	Envy	Kate	Feature film
2001	My Husband, My Killer	Megan Kalajzich	TV film
2002	Teesh and Trude	Trudy (Trude)	Feature film
2002	The Nugget	Roadhouse Waitress	Feature film
2005	Little Fish	Denise	Feature film
2006	Answered By Fire	Liz Savage	TV film
2007	The Tank		Film short
2008	Dream Life	Dawn	TV film
2008	Fool's Gold	Tess's Attorney	Feature film
2010	Suburbia	Mary	Film short
2013	Welcome to Iron Knob	Auntie Marg	Film short
2018	Upgrade	Pamela	Feature film
2019	Koko: A Red Dog Story	Loop-Group ADR	Feature film
2025	Birthright	Lyn	Feature film

== Theatre ==
Cropper's stage roles include:

Year	Title	Role	Company
1978	The Threepenny Opera		NIDA Theatre, Sydney
1979	Lost to the Devil	Maggie	Neutral Bay Music Hall
1979	Cabaret	Sally	Civic Playhouse, Newcastle with Hunter Valley Theatre Company
1979	Under Milk Wood		Civic Playhouse, Newcastle with Hunter Valley Theatre Company
1979	The Miracle Worker	Aunt Ev	Civic Playhouse, Newcastle with Hunter Valley Theatre Company
1980	Cyrano de Bergerac	Refreshment Girl / Lise / Sister Marthe	Sydney Opera House with STC
1980	Volpone	Celia	Nimrod Theatre, Sydney
1981	Celluloid Heroes	Alison Mackay	Opera Theatre, Adelaide, His Majesty's Theatre, Perth
1981	The Dresser	Irene	Theatre Royal, Sydney, Comedy Theatre, Melbourne, Townsville Civic Theatre, Pilbeam Theatre, Her Majesty's Theatre, Brisbane, His Majesty's Theatre, Perth
1981	Chinchilla	Romola de Pulszky	Sydney Opera House with STC
1982	Amadeus	Constanze Weber	Theatre Royal, Sydney with STC
1982	Tristram Shandy		Nimrod Theatre, Sydney
1984	A Midsummer Night's Dream		Melbourne Athenaeum with MYC
1986	The Madras House		Sydney Opera House with STC
1988	The Mortal Falcon		Sydney Opera House with STC
1988	An Ideal Husband		Wharf Theatre, Sydney with STC
1988	Loot		Wharf Theatre, Sydney with STC
1990	The Secret Rapture	Katherine Glass	Sydney Opera House with STC
1990	Three Sisters	Masha	Sydney Opera House with STC
1991	Three Stories High - Julia's Song / Painted Woman / Koori Love		Belvoir St Theatre, Sydney
1992	The Marriage of Figaro	The Countess	Suncorp Theatre, Brisbane
1992	Vassa		NIDA Studio, Sydney
1993	Top Girls		Wharf Theatre, Sydney with STC
1993	The Idiot		Crossroads Theatre, Sydney with Fisher Stein Productions
1994	King Lear		Sydney Opera House with STC
2000	A Month in the Country		Sydney Opera House with STC
2002	Hippolytus		Government House, Sydney with Bell Shakespeare
2003	Hamlet	Gertrude	Sydney Opera House, Orange Civic Theatre, Playhouse Canberra, Ford Theatre, Geelong, Playhouse, Melbourne, Theatre Royal, Hobart with Bell Shakespeare
2003	As You Like It		Playhouse, Melbourne with Bell Shakespeare
2004	Twelfth Night	Maria	Sydney Opera House, Playhouse, Melbourne, Playhouse Canberra, Illawarra Performing Arts Centre, Orange Civic Theatre with Bell Shakespeare
2005	Death Variations		Seymour Centre with East Coast Theatre Company
2006	Romeo and Juliet	Lady Capulet	Playhouse, Canberra, Playhouse, Melbourne, Sydney Opera House with Bell Shakespeare
2007	Macbeth	Lady Macbeth	Australian national tour with Bell Shakespeare
2009	Poor Boy	Viv	Southbank Theatre, Sydney Theatre with MTC / STC
2011	And No More Shall We Part	Pam	Stables Theatre, Sydney with Griffin Theatre Company
2012	The Mousetrap	Mrs Boyle	Sydney Theatre, Playhouse Canberra, His Majesty's Theatre, Perth, Comedy Theatre, Melbourne, Dunstan Playhouse, St. James Theatre, Wellington, QPAC
2014	Nora	Helen	Belvoir Theatre, Sydney
2014	Ghosts	Helene Alving	MTC
2015	Elektra / Orestes	Clytemnestra	Belvoir Theatre, Sydney
2018	The Architect	Helen Pyefinch	Southbank Theatre, Melbourne with MTC
2019	Australian Realness	Mother	Malthouse Theatre, Melbourne
2021–2022	Grand Horizons	Nancy	Roslyn Packer Theatre, Sydney
	Arcadia		STC
	Great Expectations		STC
