= Mary Ann Severne =

Australian actress

- Born: Auckland, New Zealand
- Occupation: Actress
- Spouse: Henri Szeps

Mary Ann Severne (b. Auckland, New Zealand) is a New Zealand-born Australian actress active in Australian made films and television programs from the 1970s.

== Career ==
Severne began her acting career in various theatre productions including playing Paola in a production of There's a Girl in My Soup, and was part of a company at the Wayside Chapel, Sydney.

Late 1960s Australian television appearances included The Mavis Bramston Show, and Contrabandits. Throughout the 1970s Severne made many television appearances, appearing several times in guest roles in the Crawford Productions police dramas Homicide, Division 4 and Matlock Police.

Severne also worked in the UK, starring in film comedy The Adventures of Barry McKenzie (1972), and making appearances in the TV anthology series Thriller and Moonbase 3 in 1973, and Father Brown in 1974.

Returning to Australia, Severne played a leading regular role in soap opera Number 96 from 1975 until 1977, and played a guest role in sitcom Doctor Down Under in 1979. Roles in the 1980s included an appearance in feature film Run, Rebecca, Run! (1981), four episodes of A Country Practice (1982 and 1984), and a role in TV movie Barracuda (1988).

== Personal life ==
Severne was married to actor Henri Szeps from 1969 until his death in 2025; they met on the set of a play. Together they have two sons, Amos and Josh.

== Filmography ==
=== Film ===
Title	Year	Role	Type
1971	3 to Go: Judy	Margaret	Short film
1972	The Adventures of Barry McKenzie	Lesley	Feature film
1981	Run, Rebecca, Run	Jean Porter	Film
1988	Barracuda (aka The Rocks)	Mother on ferry	TV movie

=== Television ===
Title	Year	Role	Type
Late 1960s	The Mavis Bramston Show		TV series
Late 1960s	Contrabandits		TV series
1969–75	Homicide	Various roles	TV series, 6 episodes
1969–75	Division 4	Various roles	TV series, 10 episodes
1971	Owen, M.D.	Sister	TV series, 2 episodes
1971	Mogul	Fran Davies	TV series, 1 episode
1972	Love Story	Alice	TV series, 1 episode
1972	Crime of Passion	Denise Simon	TV series, 1 episode
1972	ITV Saturday Night Theatre	Nurse White	TV series, 1 episode: "Just in Time for Christmas"
1973	Thriller	Young Woman	TV series, 1 episode
1973	Moonbase 3	Sandy	TV series, 2 episodes
1973	Romany Jones	Wendy	TV series, 1 episode
1974	Father Brown	Beatrice	TV series, 1 episode
1974–75	Play School	Self	TV series
1975	Matlock Police	Monica Pearson	TV series, 1 episode
1975–77	Number 96	Laura Trent Whittaker	TV series, 73 episodes
1978	Father Dear Father in Australia	Lesley Radford	TV series, 1 episode
1978, 1979	Cop Shop	Margot Palmer / Senator Susan Pearce	TV series, 3 episodes
1979	Patrol Boat	Mrs. Lewis	TV series, 1 episode
1979	Doctor Down Under	Sister Potts	TV series, 1 episode
1981	Menotti		TV series, 1 episode
1982–87	A Country Practice	Cynthia Wallace / Colleen Whitton / Ros Peterson	TV series, 6 episodes

== Theatre ==
Title	Year	Role	Type
1967	There’s a Girl in My Soup	Poala	Comedy Theatre, Melbourne, Her Majesty's Theatre, Adelaide, Canberra Theatre
1968	Mame	Actor / Singer	Her Majesty's Theatre, Melbourne, Her Majesty's Theatre, Adelaide
1974	Well Hung	Mrs Donnelly	Nimrod Street Theatre, Sydney
