= Never Never Newsreel =

Australian radio program

- Genre: Radio comedy
- Country of origin: Australia
- Language: English
- Home station: Radio 2UE
- Created by: Josh Zepps
- Original release: June 2008

The Never Never Newsreel was a weekly syndicated satirical radio sketch created by Australian satirist Josh Zepps that ran until June 2008. It was aired on Radio 2UE in Sydney and on syndicated stations across Australia.

The Newsreel was the successor to Mike Carlton's long-running weekly comedy sketch Friday News Review, which Zepps also performed in. Zepps' other weekly political sketch, Kevin Rudd's Diary, is the successor to John Howard's Diary and Kim Beazley's Diary.
