= Adam Garnett =

Australian actor

- Occupation: Actor
- Years active: 1977–1987

Adam Garnett is an Australian actor. He won the 1982 Logie Award for Performance by a juvenile for his performance in I Can Jump Puddles.

Garnett appeared in an Aerogard commercial with Max Walker in 1977 where he was known for the line "Avagoodweekend Mr Walker". Alan Marshall personally chose Garnett to play him in I Can Jump Puddles in part because of that ad. He played Marshall as a child in the series with Lewis Fitz-Gerald later playing him as an adult.

Other screen roles include sharing the role of Johnny in The Timeless Land, playing Rod, Rebecca's friend, in Run, Rebecca, Run, Ginger in Bellamy, and Ian in The Willow Bend Mystery.
