= Prisoner of Zenda (1988 film) =

- Directed by: Warwick Gilbert
- Screenplay by: Leonard Lee; Anthony Hope
- Based on: The Prisoner of Zenda 1894 novel by Edward E. Rice Anthony Hope; The Prisoner of Zenda 1896 play by Edward E. Rose
- Produced by: Roz Phillips
- Starring: Christine Amor; Robert Coleby; Claire Crowther
- Edited by: Peter Jennings; Caroline Neave
- Music by: John Stuart
- Distributed by: NuTech Digital; Waterfall Home Entertainment
- Release date: 1988
- Running time: 49 minutes
- Country: Australia
- Language: English

Prisoner of Zenda is a 1988 Australian animated adventure film from Burbank Films Australia. It was originally released in 1988. The film is based on Anthony Hope's classic 1894 English novel, The Prisoner of Zenda, and was adapted by Leonard Lee. It was produced by Roz Phillips and featured original music by John Stuart. The copyright in this film is now owned by Pulse Distribution and Entertainment and administered by digital rights management firm NuTech Digital. In the UK, the distributor was Waterfall Home Entertainment.

== Plot ==
On his deathbed, the King of Ruritania announces to his twin sons, Prince Rudolph and Prince Michael, that he must choose one of them to be the future king of Ruritania following his death. The king believes that the younger twin, Rudolph, is more fit to be king, and so chooses him for the throne. Prince Rudolph is shocked with his father's decision and Prince Michael is outraged and angry. Following his father's death, "Black Michael", as he is known to some of the villagers, gathers his minions and expresses his anger at his father's decision, which he believes to be foolish. He recalls that his father had mentioned that he, Michael, should be king, if and when his brother died; thus, he begins to devise a plan to cause Rudolph's death. Michael's wife, Princess Antoinette, is shocked after hearing her beloved husband speak ill of his dead father, and even more after hearing of his plot to murder Rudolph. When she confronts him, Michael sends Antoinette away and tells her that if he can't count on her loyalty, she is no longer his wife.

Antoinette runs to Rudolph and informs him of Michael's plots; thought at first Rudolph refuses to believe her, Antoinette insists. Following one of Rudolph's plans to ensure his own safety, Princess Antoinette travels to London, where she meets another young man, by the name of Rudolph, who looks remarkably and exactly like the king-to-be of Ruritania.

Princess Antoinette brings the new Rudolph to Ruritania, hoping that he may help her and Rudolph to be safe from Michael. Rudolph, who still trusts his brother, accepts an invitation from Michael, who offers him a drink. Pretending that his intentions were to congratulate Rudolph stepping up to the throne, Michael drugs his brother causing him to enter a deep coma, only a few days prior to his coronation. The new Rudolph proposes to accept the crown himself, so that Prince Rudolph will step up to the throne as soon as he comes out from his state of unconsciousness. When Michael learns of this, he kidnaps the prince and takes him away to the Castle Zenda, where he intends to murder him. Antoinette and Rudolph come up with a plan to surprise Michael and his minions at Zenda and thus rescue the prince. When they defeat Michael, the young prince Rudolph becomes the king of Ruritania and takes his father's place at last.

== See also ==
- Burbank Films Australia
- List of films in the public domain in the United States
