= Simon Walker (composer) =

Australian film & television composer

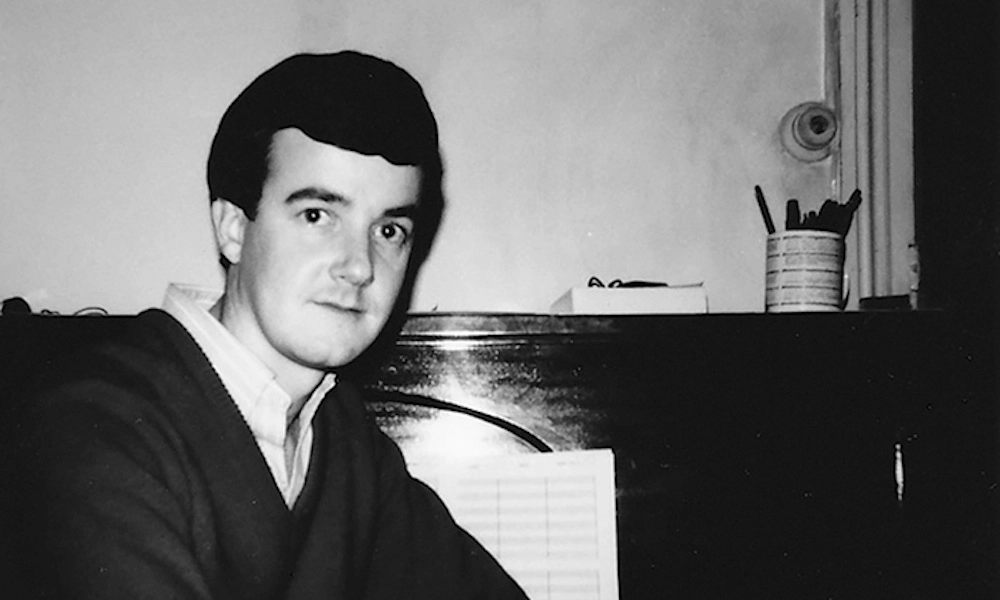
- Simon Walker (Photo by Philip Powers)

Background information
- Born: 1961; Sydney, Australia
- Died: 2010 (aged 48–49)
- Genre: Film score
- Occupation: Composer

Simon Walker (born in Sydney 1961; died June 2010) was an Australian composer of many notable film and television scores such as For the Term of His Natural Life, The Wild Duck, The Odyssey, Annie's Coming Out, It Is of Eden I Was Dreaming, Around the World in 80 Days, The Pickwick Papers, Run, Rebecca, Run, and the theme as well as incidental music for the long-running ABC TV drama series G.P.. Annie's Coming Out won multiple awards including Best Film at the 1984 Australian Film Institute (AFI) Awards (now known as AACTA Awards), and G.P. won the 1992 Logie Award for Most Outstanding Series

Several of Walker's screen scores and one classical composition have been released on music albums, mostly being various titles on the Australian 1M1 Records soundtrack label.

== Awards and nominations ==
=== AFI Awards ===
The Australian Film Institute (AFI) Awards (now known as AACTA Awards) are presented annually by the Australian Academy of Cinema and Television Arts.

Year	Film	Category	Result	Ref.
1984	Annie's Coming Out	Best Original Music Score	Nominated	

== Discography ==
Title	Details
For The Term Of His Natural Life (Original Television Soundtrack)	Released: 1988; Format: CD; Label: 1M1 Records (1M1CD1001)
Simon Walker/ Brian May – Volume One - Original Motion Picture Scores From Australia: The Wild Duck / Frog Dreaming	Released: 1988; Format: CD; Label: Southern Cross Records (SCCD 1019)
Simon Walker, Mark Isaacs, Philip Powers, Guy Gross, Chris Neal – Music For Pianos, Percussion and Synthesizers	Released: 1989; Format: CD; Label: 1M1 Records (1M1CD1004)
The Pickwick Papers (Original Soundtrack Recording)	Released: 2002; Format: CD; Label: 1M1 Records (1M1CD1021)
The Last Of The Mohicans & Tom Sawyer	Released: 2003; Format: CD; Label: 1M1 Records (1M1CD1027)
Annie's Coming Out	Released: 2009; Format: CD; Label: 1M1 Records (1M1CD1026)
For The Term Of His Natural Life / The Wild Duck	Released: 2019; Format: CD/Digital; Label: Dragon's Domain Records (DDR661)
