= Ring of Scorpio =

1990 Australian TV miniseries

- Written by: Suzanne Hawley
- Directed by: Ian Barry
- Starring: Caroline Goodall; Linda Cropper; Catherine Oxenberg; Jack Scalia; Peter Kowitz
- Theme music composer: Martin Armiger
- Country of origin: Australia
- Original language: English
- No. of episodes: 2

Production
- Producer: Errol Sullivan
- Cinematography: Jamie Doolan
- Running time: 3h 9m
- Production company: Southern Star Sullivan Productions

Original release
- Network: Nine Network (Australia); BBC Television (United Kingdom)
- Release: 28 October 1990 – 1990

Ring of Scorpio is a 1990 Australian TV miniseries by Alan Bateman, Errol Sullivan and Kim Williams. It was made with assistance from the Film Finance Corporation Australia, BBC Television and the Nine Network. It was shot in Morocco, Spain, Sydney and Broken Hill.

The casting of Americans Jack Scalia (who had recently completed a season-long role in Dallas) and Catherine Oxenberg (then best known for her role as Amanda on Dynasty), and Briton Caroline Goodall was indicative of a trend in Australian miniseries from the early 1990s to cast well-known foreign actors in leading roles to increase the potential appeal to international audiences.

== Plot ==
Three women (Catherine Oxenberg, Caroline Goodall, Linda Cropper) plot revenge against a drug dealer (Jack Scalia) who seduced them before scamming them to participate in his operations, ultimately causing them to spend time in Moroccan prisons, ruining their lives.

== Synopsis ==
A gripping story of secrets within secrets, of disloyalty and deception, of passion, murder and revenge. Helen Simmons cannot believe her eyes. There, on the floor of the Sydney Stock Exchange, is a man she thought was dead. Richard Deveraux, the man who once told her he loved her, the man who betrayed her, the man who nearly destroyed her and her friends. Now, it seems Richard is not only alive and well, he is even more dangerous than ever. When Helen discovers he is planning a multi-million dollar stockmarket scam, she decides it's time to act. With her two former friends, she sets out to avenge all the wrongs and the hurt of the past. But, like the scorpion on the ring that he once gave each girl as a symbol of his love, Richard Deveraux is a venomous and deadly enemy. — Banijay Rights

== Production ==
- Ian Barry (Director)
- Suzanne Hawley (Writer)
- Errol Sullivan (Producer)

== Cast ==
- Catherine Oxenberg as Fiona Matthews McDonald
- Caroline Goodall as Helen Simmons
- Linda Cropper as Marlene Walker
- Jack Scalia as Richard Devereaux
- Peter Kowitz as Gary Withers
- Caz Lederman as Pauline
- Victoria Longley
- Bruno Lucia as Bruno
- Rebecca Gibney as Judith
- Richard Moir as Sergeant Hayes
- Pat Bishop as Beth Rogers
- Lillian Crombie as Aboriginal Woman
- Alastair Duncan as Mr Watts

== Music ==
- Martin Armiger: composer
- Derek Williams: orchestrator, conductor, composer additional music

== Reception ==
Ring of Scorpio was nominated for an AFI Award for 'Best Television Mini Series or Telefeature' in 1991. It rated well in a small number of IMDb user reviews, garnering an average of 7.1/10
