= Around the World in 80 Days (1988 film) =

- Directed by: Geoff Collins
- Written by: Leonard Lee
- Based on: Around the World in Eighty Days by Jules Verne
- Produced by: Roz Phillips
- Starring: Keith Scott; Wallas Eaton; Ross Higgins
- Edited by: Peter Jennings; Caroline Neave
- Music by: Simon Walker
- Distributed by: NuTech Digital
- Release date: 1988 (Australia)
- Running time: 49 minutes
- Country: Australia
- Language: English

Around the World in 80 Days is a 1988 Australian 49-minute direct-to-video animated film from Burbank Films Australia. The film is based on Jules Verne's classic French novel, Around the World in 80 Days, first published in 1872, and was adapted by Leonard Lee.

== Plot summary ==
The young French Passepartout arrives in London in 1872 to become Mr. Phileas Fogg's valet on the very same day his master makes a bet that changes both of their lives. Mr. Fogg assures the members at his club that it is now possible to travel the world in 80 days or less; they disagree and so he challenges himself to set off and prove them wrong. He bets a total of £200,000 that he will sail away, tour the world, and return to that very spot in eighty days or less. After accepting his wager, the club members bid him farewell and wish him luck on his long voyage across the world. Passepartout takes an immediate liking for his new determined master, but even so, the young valet is not too enthusiastic about sailing away from London aboard a hot air balloon. One day before their departure, the Bank of England had been assaulted and robbed by a man whose physical appearance resembled that of Mr. Phileas Fogg. A detective named Fix investigates the crime and declares Phileas Fogg guilty of bank robbery, hiding behind the identity of a noble gentleman. Mr. Fogg and Passepartout fly on the balloon over France, Italy and the Swiss Alps. Sure that he will win his bet, Mr. Fogg has no second thoughts about spending whatever money he needs in order for his voyage to continue uninterrupted, even if it means the purchase of elephants. During a ride aboard an elephant from Bombay to Calcutta, Mr. Fogg and Passepartout come across a suttee procession, in which a young woman is to be sacrificed by worshippers of Thuggee. They rescue the young girl and take her to the Indian Consulate.

More adventures and misadventures follow the two companions as they cross the Pacific Ocean and the United States, closely watched and followed by Fix. Upon returning to London on the 79th day of travel, Phileas Fogg is arrested by the detective and accused of robbery, then he is placed inside a cell. Fogg is stuck in the cell until it appears to be too late for him to present himself at the club in time to win the wager. Mr. Fix then appears at the cell where Fogg is being kept and tells him that he has made a terrible mistake, and that the man truly responsible for the robbery had just been captured. Mr. Fogg punches Mr. Fix on the nose and the detective falls to the ground unconscious. Fogg returns to his residence with Passepartout, resigned to the fact that he has lost his fortune. When they believe all is lost, a local newspaper informs them that they were mistaken about the date, and it is, in fact, one day earlier than they had thought because they crossed the International Date Line while circumnavigating the globe in an eastward direction. Fogg and Passepartout rush to the club where they present themselves just in time to win the wager. The club members cheer for Fogg's success and all admit that he had been right and had proven so. Mr. Fogg then assures his friends that a trip around the world can really be made in no more than sixty-six days, to the dismay of Passepartout who fears another adventurous trip around the world.

== Production ==
The film was produced by Roz Phillips and featured original music by Simon Walker. The film imitated BRB Internacional's Spanish 1981 series, La vuelta al mundo de Willy Fog, in its use of anthropomorphic animals in the human roles. Once released on DVD by Digiview as a budget release, it is now owned by 1091 Pictures.

== See also ==
- Around the World in 80 Days – the 1989 mini-series starring Eric Idle of Monty Python fame
