= The Pickwick Papers (1985 film) =

Australian animated television film

- Directed by: Warwick Gilbert
- Written by: Steven Fosberry
- Based on: The Pickwick Papers by Charles Dickens
- Produced by: Tim Brooke-Hunt
- Starring: Colin Borgonon; Margaret Christensen; Wallas Eaton; Brian Harrison; Phillip Hinton; Richard Meikle; Judy Nunn; Henri Szeps
- Edited by: Peter Jennings; Caroline Neave
- Music by: Simon Walker
- Production company: Burbank Films Australia
- Release date: 26 March 1985
- Running time: 72 minutes
- Country: Australia
- Language: English

The Pickwick Papers is a 1985 animated Australian TV film based on the 1837 novel of the same name by Charles Dickens.

== Cast ==
- Colin Borgonon
- Margaret Christensen
- Wallas Eaton
- Brian Harrison
- Phillip Hinton
- Richard Meikle
- Judy Nunn
- Henri Szeps

== Release ==
INI Entertainment Group Inc. licensed the film, alongside others in the International Family Classics library, to 20th Century Fox. To date, it's the only one known to have its rights utilized by the latter company, as it aired on HBO on June 14, 1989. It was released by GoodTimes Home Video on DVD, under license by INI's successor, Liberty International Entertainment.

== Soundtrack album ==
The music score for this film by Simon Walker was released as a soundtrack album in 2002 on 1M1 Records (1M1CD1021).
