= Palace of Dreams =

1985 Australian TV series

- Based on: idea by Sandra Levy
- Written by: Denny Lawrence; John Misto; John Upton; Ian David; Deb Oswald; Marc Rosenberg
- Directed by: Denny Lawrence; Geoffrey Nottage; Graham Thorburn; David Goldie; Riccardo Pellizzeri
- Starring: Henri Szeps; Linda Cropper
- Theme music composer: Chris Neal
- Country of origin: Australia
- Original language: English
- No. of episodes: 10 x 1 hour

Production
- Producer: Sandra Levy

Original release
- Network: ABC
- Release: 6 June – 8 August 1985

Palace of Dreams is a 1985 Australian fictional mini series about a Jewish family running a hotel in working class inner city of Sydney in the 1930s. Sandra Levy conceived and produced the series, based on her experience of living in a similar hotel run by her Russian Jewish mother during the Great Depression. The main set of the series is Dundee Palace (formerly the Olympic Hotel), on the corner of Regent Street and Moore Park Road, Paddington). It was advertised in newspapers of the time as 'A story of belonging'. It included historical events such as the popularity of Donald Bradman and aviation achievements of Bert Hinkler and Charles Kingsford Smith. It also showed archival footage of the opening of the Sydney Harbour Bridge.

The Fryer Library at the University of Queensland holds the show's manuscripts in the Hanger Collection of Australian Playscripts.

== Premise ==
The series is based on a hotel owned by the Russian Jewish emigrant family, the Mendels. Parents Chana and Mick Mendel live at the hotel with grandfather, and children Joseph, Ruth and Miriam. Writer Tom Raynor (Michael O'Neill) moves from the family farm and grows close to the Mendel family.

== Cast and crew ==
Actor	Character
Henri Szeps	Mick Mendel
Michael O'Neill	Tom Raynor
Deidre Rubenstein	Chana Mendel
Linda Cropper	Miriam Mendel
Susie Lindeman	Ruth Mendel
Durand Sinclair	Joseph Mendel
John Walton	Charlie

=== Episode writers ===
#	Time period	Writers
1	February - March 1931	Ian David and Denny Lawrence
2	April - May 1931	John Upton
3	May - June 1931	John Misto
4	July - August 1931	Ian David
5	September - October 1931	John Upton
6	November 1931	Debra Oswald
7	December 1931	Debra Oswald
8	December 1931 - January 1932	Marc Rosenberg
9	February - March 1932	Marc Rosenberg
10	March - May 1932	John Misto

== Awards and nominations ==
In 1985, the show was a winner in the annual Television Society of Australia Penguin awards. In 1986, Deirdre Rubenstein won best actress for her role in the show.
