= The Willow Bend Mystery =

- Written by: John Honey
- Directed by: Marcus Cole
- Starring: Robin Ramsay; Rowena Wallace; Michelle Jarman
- Country of origin: Australia
- Original language: English
- No. of seasons: 1
- No. of episodes: 5

Production
- Executive producer: John Honey
- Producer: Don Anderson
- Cinematography: Gert Kirchner
- Editor: Kerry Regan
- Running time: 25 minutes

Original release
- Network: ABC
- Release: 12 September – 16 September 1983

The Willow Bend Mystery is an Australian television series that aired on ABC in 1983. It was originally broadcast as a five part series and later combined into a film titled The Mesmerist. It was produced by the Tasmanian Film Corporation.

== Synopsis ==
Kay suspects her mother's new boyfriend has hypnotic powers.

== Cast ==
- Robin Ramsay as Adrian
- Rowena Wallace as Linda
- Michelle Jarman as Kay
- Lindsay Arnold as Bernard
- Adam Garnett as Ian
- Ursula Granville as Aunt Emma
- Hazel Alger as Aunt Evelyn

== Reception ==
Jason Dasey of the Sydney Morning Herald was very critical of the show, finishing his review "The only aspect about this series that is at all tolerable is the Tasmanian scenery, which is only half-spoilt by the poor video tape."
