= Geoff Collins =

Geoff Collins may refer to:

- Geoff Collins (American football), American college football coach
- Geoff Collins (Australian rules footballer), Australian rules football player
