= Sherlock Holmes and the Valley of Fear =

1983 Australian TV film

Sherlock Holmes and the Valley of Fear is a 1983 Australian animated television film produced by Tom Stacey and George Stephenson for Burbank Films. It is an adaptation of Sir Arthur Conan Doyle's novel The Valley of Fear (1915), the fourth and final Sherlock Holmes novel featuring Sherlock Holmes and Dr. John Watson.

== Voice cast ==
- Peter O'Toole as Sherlock Holmes
- Earle Cross as Dr. Watson
- Additional voices are provided by Brian Adams, Colin Borgonon, Judy Nunn and Henri Szeps.
