= Run, Rebecca, Run =

- Directed by: Peter Maxwell
- Written by: Charles Stamp
- Based on: idea by Gary Deacon
- Produced by: Brendon Lunney
- Starring: Simone Buchanan; Henri Szeps; Adam Garnett
- Cinematography: Phil Pike
- Edited by: Bob Cogger
- Music by: Simon Walker
- Release date: 1982
- Running time: 80 min
- Country: Australia
- Language: English

Run, Rebecca, Run is a 1982 Australian film directed by Peter Maxwell and starring Simone Buchanan, Henri Szeps, and Adam Garnett.

== Premise ==
A young girl is captured by an illegal alien on an Australian island. She grows to understand his situation and assists him in his attempts to be granted refugee status.

== Cast ==
- Simone Buchanan as Rebecca
- Henri Szeps as Manuel Cortez
- Adam Garnett as Rod
- John Ewart as Minister for Immigration
- Ron Haddrick as Speaker of Parliament
- John Stanton as Bob Porter
- Mary Ann Severne as Jean Porter
- Peter Sumner as Mr Dimitros

== Production ==
It was shot in Sydney. It was one of a series of children's dramas produced by Independent Productions.

== Release ==
Run, Rebecca, Run, like others produced by Independent Productions, sold better overseas than in Australia and had been available on video for over two years before making it to television in December 1984. Earlier that year it had a special holiday season run in Melbourne cinemas in May.

== Reception ==
Jill Morris of The Age said "'Run Rebecca Run' is an outstandingly honest film, built around the inadvertent kidnapping of a young girl who is held hostage on an island while her paperboy pal competes with official rescuers in a determined search." When it showed on TV she wrote "The feast of fine children's drama which begins on ABC TV on Sunday night with Run Rebecca Run includes some quality dramas which have been a long time coming. The show (7.30 pm Sunday on Channel 2) has been given top billing with good reason." The Sun-Herald's Jacqueline Lee Lewes notes "Right up to the last scene the makers of Run Rebecca Run play it straight, keeping the story as an easy-to-watch adventure dram which avoids stereo-types and cliches. There's a message there about justice, tolerance and understanding but it is subtly conveyed." The Canberra Times says "It's stirring stuff set against the delightful backdrop of Pittwater, just north of Sydney. There are lots of shots of police helicopters and seaplanes for the technically minded and of course, in true Enid Blyton tradition, it's the kids that solve the mystery and save the day. I'd recommend the film for children aged five to 13." Martin & Porter awarded the "action filled adventure" four stars, of a possible five.

Run Rebecca, Run won the Ruby Slipper Award for the Best Feature Length Film at the 12th International Children's Film Festival."
