= Athenaeum Theatre, Sydney =

The Athenaeum Theatre was an entertainment venue at 610 George Street on Brickfield Hill, Sydney, between Liverpool and Bathurst streets. For most of existence it was a venue for screening films and live acts, including lectures, but not live theatre, concerts or musicals.

== History ==
Around 1890, 610 George Street was the Shamrock Club, owned by John Lawler, who had a six-storey warehouse next door at no. 608 and a three-storey bedding and furniture warehouse at no. 612, which in 1894 were destroyed by fire, severely damaging other buildings nearby, many owned by the Edward Hordern company of Melbourne.

The rebuilt building became Maple & Co.'s furniture shop, then a shop for Edward Hordern until the end of April 1906. It was then opened as the Atheneum Hall by Yankee stump orator or preacher "Wilson Wilson" on Sunday 29 April 1906 to deliver a concert and lecture. He would return every Sunday for the next three months.

He was followed on 5 May 1906 with "Morton's Living Pictures", (a film show), and "The Uranians" (a group of musicians). Initially supported by live acts (from 2 June 1906 the featured artist was Professor Godfrey and his troupe of Acrobatic Baboons). Around this time the spelling in advertisements had changed to Athenaeum Theatre.

From 22 September to 27 October the Italian press advertised a variety programme at the Athenaeum.

"Morton's Living Pictures" returned and was still running on 28 January 1907, but spelling of the venue had reverted to "Atheneum".

In February 1907 with a change of management its name was changed to Oxford Theatre. That name persisted until November 1908, after which it became the Oxford Hall with a change of owner. It became the Colonial Theatre, dedicated to moving pictures, in January 1910 and reopened on 2 May, screening continuously from 11 am to 11 pm. It closed April 1916.
