= Josh Szeps =

Australian media personality

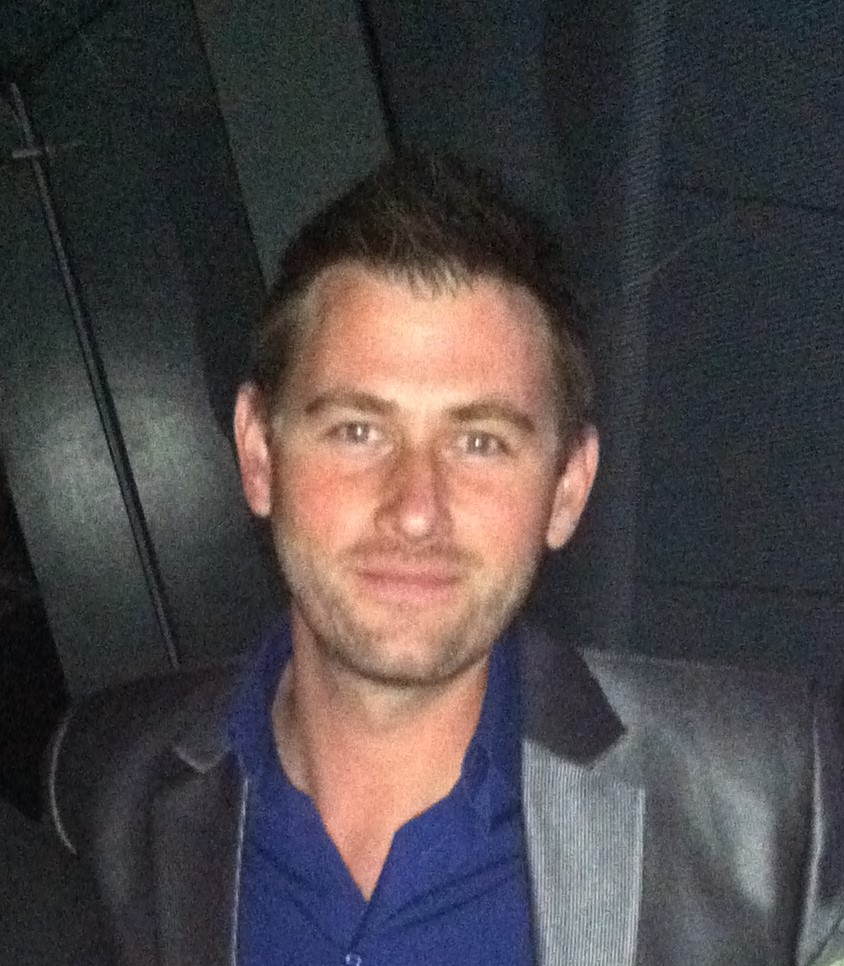
- Born: 22 November 1977; Sydney, Australia
- Occupations: Actor; media personality; political satirist; TV show host; radio presenter
- Parent: Henri Szeps

Josh Szeps, previously known as Josh Zepps, is an Australian media personality, political satirist, and television presenter.

Szeps has previously hosted Weekend Breakfast on ABC News. He was a founding host for HuffPost Live and his work has included satirical writing and presenting for Australian radio, as well as the hosting of Brink, an American TV series. He also hosted the podcast Point of Inquiry for the Center for Inquiry. He currently hosts the podcast, Uncomfortable Conversations.

== Early life and education ==
Szeps is the son of actor Henri Szeps. His paternal family were Holocaust survivors.

Szeps attended Fort Street High School and the University of Technology, Sydney.

He spells his name "Zepps" in the United States to avoid pronunciation confusion, but has not officially changed his name.

== Television ==
Beginning in 2008, Szeps was the host and creative producer of the Science Channel's Brink, a news-style TV series which examined breakthroughs in technology and discovery. The series ended the following year. Later, he was anchor and correspondent on CBS News Productions' Peabody-winning Channel One News.

In 2012, Szeps was a founding host for HuffPost Live.

He has also appeared on the panel and co-hosted The Project on Network Ten in Australia and the ABC News program Weekend Breakfast.

In January 2019, ABC announced that Szeps would replace Andrew Geoghegan as host of Weekend Breakfast.

== Radio ==
Over the Summer 2016/2017 period Szeps hosted the National Evenings Show on ABC Local Radio across Australia.

Szeps hosts a podcast tackling societal issues, Uncomfortable Conversations with Josh Szeps.

At the end of 2021, Szeps became the presenter of ABC Radio Sydney's three-hour-long Afternoons Program. In 2023, he announced that he would be leaving the ABC to work on his podcast and start a YouTube channel. Szeps made his resignation announcement live on air, saying about his work with the ABC that "The penalties for speaking bluntly...are very high." He said that he was a misfit there, that "I'm a child of refugees, but I'm a white Australian. I'm a gay guy, but I hate Mardi Gras. ...I'm an ABC presenter but I don't like kale."

== Voice career ==
Szeps was cast as the voice of "Olly the Kookaburra", one of three mascots in the Sydney Summer Olympics. After leaving university in 2000, Szeps was hired as a script assistant on comedy television series BackBerner. He also worked in the production of 2SM and 2GB, two Australian radio stations. In 2003, Szeps was hired by Mike Carlton of 2UE, a commercial radio station in Sydney. Szeps developed a radio soliloquy for 2UE called "John Howard's Diary", in which he made a weekly impersonation of the Australian Prime Minister's thoughts on the past week's events. Szeps said to The Sydney Morning Herald in 2003 that "if John Howard wasn't in power, it's entirely possible my life would be going in a completely different direction". After John Howard was defeated in the 2007 Australian federal election, Szeps' radio spoof became "Kevin Rudd's Diary", a satire of the new prime minister in the same format. Szeps was the creator of Never Never Newsreel, a weekly syndicated satirical radio sketch that ran until June 2008.

== Podcasting ==
Szeps currently hosts the Substack and podcast Uncomfortable Conversations. As of 20 May 2024, the podcast had over 19,000 subscribers. He has also co-hosted episodes of Sam Harris's Making Sense podcast and appeared on Chris Williamson's podcast, Modern Wisdom, among others.

In 2022, Szeps made headlines after appearing on The Joe Rogan Experience. Szeps challenged Joe Rogan's claims about the effects of the coronavirus vaccine on young people. Rogan later admitted he was made to 'look dumb' during the exchange.

== Personal life ==
Szeps was married in 2014, in New Hampshire, to American social media marketing specialist Sean Joseph Gallerani, now known as Sean Szeps. The couple live in Sydney, Australia with their twins, Stella and Cooper, who were born of a relative of Sean via a commercial surrogacy arrangement in Minneapolis, Josh being the father.
