= Mike Carlton =

Australian media commentator and author

Mike Carlton AM
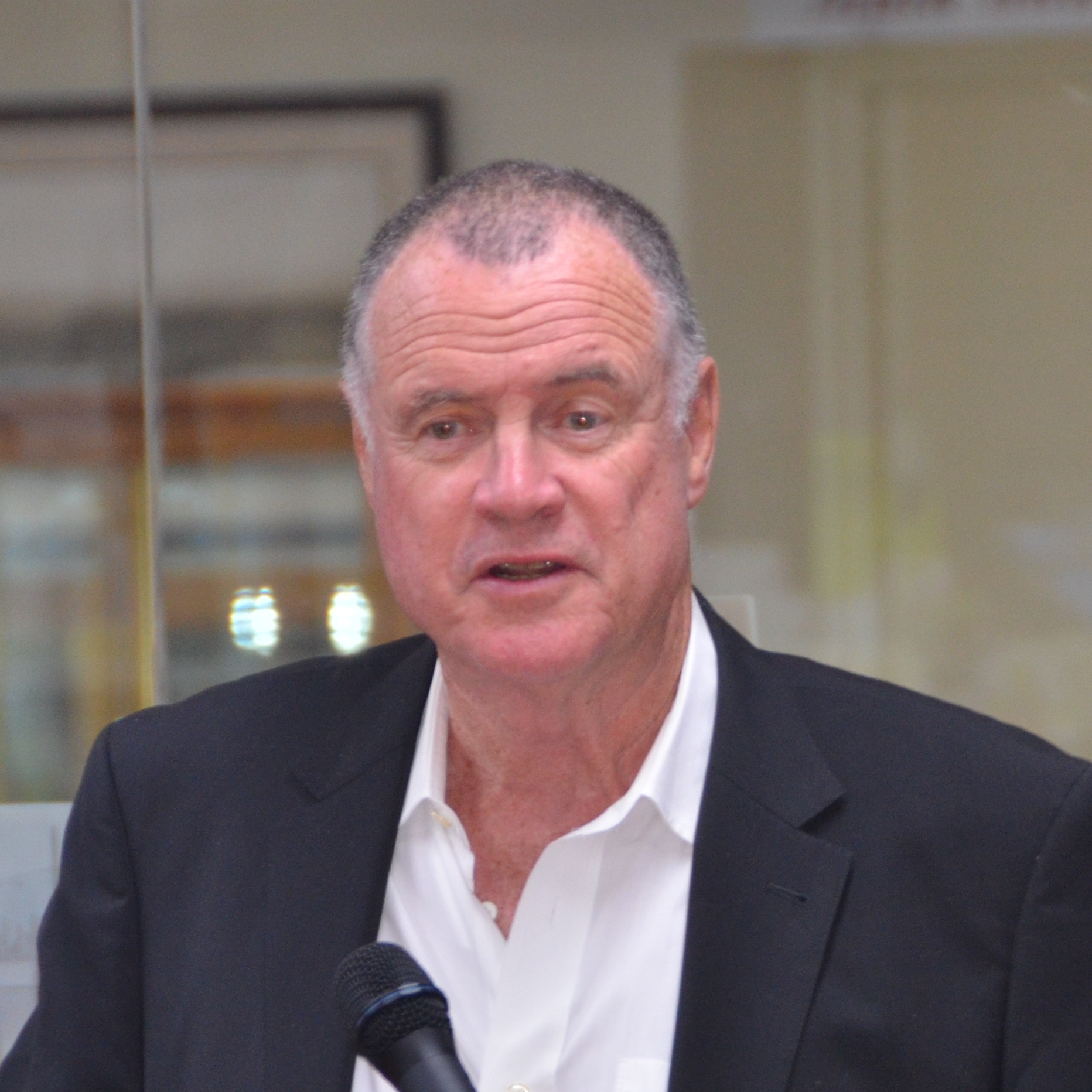
- Mike Carlton at a book signing in 2013
- Born: Michael James Carlton; 31 January 1946 (age 80); Sydney, New South Wales, Australia
- Education: Barker College
- Years active: 1963–2009
- Known for: Former host with radio network's 2GB and 2UE
- Spouses: Kerri; Morag Ramsay
- Children: 3

Michael James Carlton, AM (born 31 January 1946) is an Australian former media commentator, radio host, television journalist, author and newspaper columnist. He formerly co-hosted the daily breakfast program on Sydney radio station 2UE with Peter FitzSimons and later Sandy Aloisi.

Carlton was known for his criticism of conservative public figures such as former prime minister John Howard, former Liberal leader Alexander Downer, and conservative governments, including the United States' Reagan and Bush administrations. Carlton is also known for his feud with conservative radio host Ray Hadley.

== Family ==
Carlton's father, James Carlton, was an athlete who competed in sprinting at the 1928 Summer Olympics in Amsterdam and in 1930, set an Australian national record for the 100 yards, which was not broken until 1953. He would have been selected for the 1932 Olympics but left sport to become a Catholic priest. During World War II he was assigned to teach the Catholic faith to a non-Catholic woman who was engaged to a Catholic man. He fell in love with the woman and left the priesthood. They had two sons, Mike and Peter. Jim Carlton died in 1951 when Mike was five.

Mike Carlton has been married twice. He has two children with his first wife, Kerri. He met his second wife, Morag, when he was 52 and she was 23, working as his producer at ABC radio. They have one child together.

== Early career ==
Carlton began his career with the Australian Broadcasting Commission (ABC) as a cadet journalist in 1963, aged 17. His file reports as an ABC war correspondent in Vietnam earned him great admiration within the industry and a promotion to chief of the ABC's news bureau in Jakarta, Indonesia.

Garnering further accolades on his return with the pioneering 1970s ABC-TV current affairs program This Day Tonight.

He moved to his first radio program as host at Sydney commercial station 2GB in the early 1980s, this is where "Friday News Review" was born. Carlton dominated morning radio for 2GB for a number of years until Alan Jones was moved into the breakfast slot at 2UE in March 1988, and Carlton's ratings started to falter. In the early 1990s he was a presenter for London's LBC Newstalk 97.3FM, then under Australian ownership. At first he presented the drivetime programme, but it was as presenter of The Morning Report breakfast programme that he came to prominence, winning a prestigious Sony Radio Academy Award. This programme helped to change the station's financial fortunes. He later wrote a novel set at a London talk radio station called Off the Air, which became a best-seller in Australia in the late 1990s.

== Talk show host ==
In 1994, Carlton returned to Sydney to host a morning program on music station Mix 106.5. He then moved to the drive slot at 702 ABC Sydney. Building a reasonable following and establishing a format that he has largely retained in the years since, he was then poached by commercial broadcaster 2UE. Carlton hosted 2UE's drivetime (3pm – 6pm) program for a number of years, before moving to the breakfast timeslot (5:30 am – 9 am). In a move to improve ratings, 2UE management teamed Carlton with media personality, fellow Sydney Morning Herald columnist and longtime friend of Carlton's, Peter FitzSimons, on the breakfast show in 2006. Although the ratings for the show gradually improved, they remained well behind the top two AM talk stations for the breakfast period.

Peter FitzSimons left the show at the end of 2007, and was replaced by Sandy Aloisi from 2008. Carlton's former workmate, now rival, Alan Jones continued to dominate Sydney radio talkback.

A long-running feud with fellow 2UE broadcaster Stan Zemanek, noted for his conservative views, had become a feature of Carlton's recent career prior to Zemanek's death in mid-2007. On 17 July 2007, Carlton made comments regarding his late rival. Responding to a listener's question as to why he wouldn't attend Zemanek's funeral, Carlton replied that it would be "an act of sheer hypocrisy ... I loathed him." He continued: "I'd only go to check that he was actually dead." Carlton later apologised for the remarks, which had been the subject of criticism from fellow radio presenters and 2UE staff.

A highly popular feature of Carlton's long-running radio program (and indeed his previous radio career before he joined 2UE), was the weekly political satire segment, Friday News Review. The segment was well known for its fast-paced sketches, topical skewering of high-profile politicians, celebrities and sportspeople across the nation and around the world, and its extremely accurate voice-impersonations of the leading characters. Most of the characters in the segment not portrayed by Carlton were portrayed by Australian actor and television personality Josh Zepps. Friday News Review was one of the last political satire programs on mainstream commercial media in Australia.

On 18 September 2009, Carlton retired from his long-running 2UE Breakfast show after over 26 years on Australian morning radio citing an unwillingness to continue with early morning hours and a desire to spend more time with his family and newborn son.

== Newspaper columnist ==
Carlton was a columnist for The Sydney Morning Herald, initially being sacked from the position on 29 August 2008, for refusing to write his column during a strike by journalists at Fairfax Media. After a lengthy campaign by Herald readers and the appointment of a new editor he was invited to rejoin the newspaper in 2009. The Sydney Morning Herald published an article by Carlton entitled "Israel’s rank and rotten fruit is being called fascism" in July 2014. The article was critical of Israel's actions during its 2014 Gaza offensive. Carlton responded to criticism of the article by penning abusive and anti-Semitic tweets and emails attacking those who disagreed, an action Carlton later termed "probably foolish". He resigned from the paper when he was told he would be suspended from the paper for four to six weeks while further action was being considered. Carlton said he believed the paper "buckled" to pressure from pro-Israel campaigners and from News Corporation newspapers, which, he said hated him "for all the usual reasons".

== Author ==
Carlton has published five books on Australian naval history:

- Cruiser: The Life And Loss Of HMAS Perth And Her Crew (William Heinemann Australia, 2011) ISBN 9781864711332
- First Victory (William Heinemann Australia, 2013) ISBN 9781742757636
- Flagship: The Cruiser HMAS Australia II and the Pacific War on Japan (William Heinemann Australia, 2016) ISBN 9780857987778
- The Scrap Iron Flotilla: Five Valiant Destroyers and the Australian War in the Mediterranean (William Heinemann Australia, 2022) ISBN 9781761042003
- Dive!: Australian Submariners at War (Penguin, 2024) ISBN 9781761342882

Memoir:

- On Air, William Heinemann Book published by Penguin Random House Australia, 2018, ISBN 978-0-85798-780-8

Co-authored:

- The Great Australian Writer's Collection 2013 (RHA eBooks Adult, 2013) ISBN 9780857983619

== Awards ==
In the 2020 Queen's Birthday Honours, Carlton was appointed a Member of the Order of Australia (AM) for "significant service to the print and broadcast media, and to naval history".
