= Celluloid Heroes (play) =

1980 play by David Williamson

- Sydney Morning Herald 1 November 1980
- Original language: English
- Written by: David Williamson
- Subject: Australian film indstruy
- Genre: comedy
- Setting: An island off the coast of Queensland

Premiere
- Date: 3 December 1980
- Place: Nimrod Theatre, Sydney, Australia

The Age 25 November 1980

Sydney Morning Herald 13 December 1980

Celluloid Heroes is a play by David Williamson about the Australian film industry. It was written to celebrate the tenth anniversary of the Nimrod Theatre Company and is not one of his highly regarded plays.

== Plot ==
Al, an accountant turned film producer, wants to make a tax loss film, a thriller about the revenge of a ghostly tribe of Aboriginies on two white women castaways and a macho sea captain. Filming takes place on an island off the coast of Queensland. Mike, the director, rewrites the script to insert social significance. The original screenwriter, Nestor, is a former poet. Gary, the leading man, wants to amek a statement about gay rights. Dick, a local Aboriginal Man, also becomes involved.

== Original 1980 cast ==
- Peter Sumner as Al
- John Gregg as Mike
- Alan Wilson as Brett
- Henry Szeps as Gary
- Kate Fitzpatrick as Maggie
- Barbara Stephens as Allison
- Robin Ramsay as Nestor
- Kevin Smith as Dick

== Reception ==
H.G. Kippax of the Sydney Morning Herald called the play "good enough long enough to make one feel guilty about being critical" as "the first half is Williamson fooling at the top of his bent" but disliked the second half, arguing "farce and Aboriginal rights simply won't go together."

Harry Robinson of the Sun Herald called it "a brittle, thin vehicle for good gags" and "I doubt anyone will stage it three or five years from now."

Mike Gibson of the same newspaper called it "a mediocre play."

Leonard Radic of The Age argued "the first half of the satire works beautifully... but after the interval something runs awry."

=== Rewrite ===
Williamson rewrote the final scenes before the play moved to the Theatre Royal in January. "I feel I have made the Aboriginies have an excessively easy victory over the whites - exactly the sort of victory they never have in real life," he said. "What I have tried to do in the new ending is take away the fairytale ending, still have the Aboriginal character retaining his integrity and have a more likely ending which is much funnier.

Kippax reviewed the new production and declared the play "remains the funniest in Sydney... the new ending produces no miracle - the actual ending is rather tame - but he [Williamson] certainly gets the romp going again."

However subsequent tours of the play for Adelaide and Perth were unsuccessful financially, causing losses of $150,000, and the Elizabethean Theatre Trust cancelled a proposed Melbourne season. "It gave me a bit of a jolt at first," said Williamson. "But it really wasn't my first work... I tried to combine a punchy social issue (Aboriginal land rights) with a comedy of manners and it just didn't come off."

Williamson later said "I didn't get the kicking" over the play "that I might have got. I guess I was forgiven one bungle on my track record. It was really a coterie play not a GP play."

The play was rejected for publication by Currency Press, although Williamson plays typically sold very well.

== Legacy ==
Williamson later called it:

A bad play which didn't create characters that were complex enough to last the distance after interval. Part of the problem was that I felt I was writing to order... and I was supposed to be writing something light and bright and happy, but my feelings about the film industry were anything but light and bright. I think I let my personal bile about the indignities writers suffer in the film industry, and how basically shoddy it all is, spill over into the play. I wasn't sufficiently objective and I made the characters overly evil or two-dimensional... [it] was simply social satire dipped into crude farce. Not one of my best efforts... It's the only time I've worked to a commission and it's the only time I've been ashamed of the final product.

He later wrote about the Australian film industry with more acclaim in Emerald City.
