= Rodney Fisher =

Australian director

Rodney Macpherson Fisher is an Australian director and writer whose work spans theatre, opera, dance, film, and television. He has worked in most major theatres across Australia and with all Australian State Theatre Companies, as well as with Opera Australia, the Victorian State Opera (Melbourne), Bavarian State Opera (Munich), The Royal Ballet (London), and the physical theatre company Legs On The Wall.

Fisher has directed productions in England, Germany, Hungary, Hong Kong, and at the Spoleto Festival in Charleston, South Carolina. His extensive body of work includes numerous original theatre pieces and screenplays. Important works include the one-man show The Bastard from the Bush (Robin Ramsay), A Star is Torn (co-written with Robyn Archer), Master Class, Steaming (Australian tour), and My Fair Lady starring Anthony Warlow and Suzanne Johnston. His work with the Sydney Theatre Company includes productions of The Lady in the Van, Pentecost, The Rain Dancers, The Secret Rapture, A Violent Act, and The Doll Trilogy.

Fisher was Artistic Director of the State Theatre Company of South Australia from 1997 to 2000, where he directed The Department, Macbeth, The Idiot, Kafka Dances, The Rose Tattoo, Courtyard of Miracles, and Twelfth Night.

In musical performances, his directing credits include The Merry Widow (Ess Gee Productions); Maria Stuarda and My Fair Lady (Victorian State Opera); Hello Dolly (The Production Company);Shock of the New and La Traviata (Melbourne Chamber Opera); Don John (Sydney Symphony Orchestra). He adapted, designed and directed Purcell's King Arthur for the 2016 Brisbane Baroque Festival. In 2016, he also directed the Australian Chamber Orchestra's production of Barry Humphries' Weimar Cabaret, also starring Meow Meow, which toured Australia, London, and North America.

On screen, Fisher directed episodes of Great Performances (PBS; 1971), the telemovie I Can't Get Started (ABC, 1985), and the feature film Six Pack (Roadshow Films, 1992).

Fisher has received numerous accolades, including an award for "significant contribution to the theatre" from the Sydney Theatre Critics Circle. In 1988, he was appointed a Member of the Order of Australia (AM) for his services to directing and writing.
