= Irene Mitchell =

Australian actress and theatre director

Irene Gladys Mitchell MBE (24 November 1905 – 1995) was an Australian actress and theatre director, prominent in the little theatre movement in Melbourne.

== Career ==
Mitchell was the eldest daughter of (James) Herbert Mitchell (1886–1971) and Annie Maud May Mitchell, née Hallihan (c. 1888 – 23 May 1914), who had a home, "Aurilla", Princes St, Prahran, Victoria, later of Burnley, Victoria.

As a child, Mitchell studied elocution with Miss Louie Dunn, (Note: Louie Dunn (c. 1890–1950) was a successful contestant at South Street eisteddfods in her youth, and later coached many winners. She won several prizes for her 1948 production of Mona Brand's play Here Under Heaven. She died in St Kilda after a motor vehicle collision.) who encouraged her to enter the South Street and other contests in the early 1920s. By 1928 she was a member of the Theatre Association, appearing in Godfrey Cass's production of Ma Pettengill, an Australian premiere. In 1929 she won the Governor's gold medal first prize at the South Street Society's recitation competitions. By 1930 she was a committee member of the Proscenium Club, whose rooms were in Nicholas Building, Swanston Street.

In 1931 she was in the cast of Ashfield Players' The Best People by David Gray and Avery Hopwood, and Bulldog Drummond for the Old Wesley Collegians' Dramatic Society and in 1932 had the name part in the Proscenium players' The Last of Mrs. Cheyney. In 1933 she was in Gregan McMahon's production of Shaw's The Apple Cart. Other plays with the Proscenium Club were Cecil Finn Tucker's The Optimist (Note: Other plays by Melbourne socialite Dr Tucker (1876–1945) were Pleston's Experiment (1929), Butterflies and Bees (1932), Thunder and Death (1936), also several short stories and a book of golfing fiction.) in June 1934, Noël Coward's Hay Fever at the Central Hall, Little Collins Street in September. In June 1935 she was a "dashing Romeo" in a pioneering all-female professional production of Romeo and Juliet under Miss Dunn at the Garrick Theatre. They staged The Merchant of Venice a year later, and Othello (as Iago) in August 1939. She was a member of a five-woman cast playing Ernest Vajda's Fata Morgana at the Carrick in October 1936. In November she appeared in Maxim Gorki's Lower Depths for Dolia Ribush, fresh from the Moscow Arts Theatre, at the Garrick. In January 1937 she played The Children's Hour, and in February The Vinegar Tree; in June she was acclaimed as Rosalind in As You Like It with Gertrude Johnson's newly formed National Theatre Movement (NTM), all at the Princess. In February 1940 she was in the cast of Giving the Bride Away at the Princess, starring Charles Norman, written by Gerald Kirby and "Margot Neville", an Australasian premiere. This show's season was extended due to popular demand, and Just Married, for which Mitchell had also been engaged, had to be postponed. Stepping Out (Note: Original title The Mummy and the Mumps: A farce in three acts (1925) by Larry E. Johnson (born 1874), author of The Absent-minded Bridegroom and other farces) followed, then the company toured the other capital cities with Giving the Bride Away, Just Married, Charley's Aunt and Stepping Out. In April 1942 she again played Rosalind in the NTM production of As You Like It.

=== Little Theatre ===
Alongside her other commitments, in 1934 Mitchell joined the Melbourne Little Theatre, founded by Brett Randall and Hal Percy in 1931, which had just moved into the old St Chad's church in Martin Street, South Yarra. Her first part was the "Italian Lady" in From Morn to Midnight, an adaptation of Georg Kaiser's Von morgens bis mitternachts. Inquest followed, then in June she conducted a reading of The First Mrs Fraser, arguably a first step towards her ultimate role as director. She played Beverley Nichols' Avalanche in November and John Hastings Turner's The Spot on the Sun (Ada Reeve's farewell production) in March 1935 with Dot Rankin, who was to accompany Reeve to London, By November 1935 she was president of the Little Theatre social committee.

Valentine Katayev's Squaring the Circle was performed at the Garrick rather than the club's theatre, as was Ernest Vadja's Fata Morgana, but a report of their playing Lillian Hellman's The Children's Hour may have been mistaken. She played the Honorable Reader in S. I. Hsiung's Lady Precious Stream at the Garrick in July 1936. On Caulfield Cup night 1938 the company staged James Bridie's comedy Storm in a Teacup as a testimonial benefit for their director Brett Randall. A season of five plays by five producers was staged in November 1938 as "A Play Bill". Mitchell's contribution was The Last Mrs Fraser, by Virginia Saffold Booth. (Note: Virginia White Saffold Booth (30 November 1911 – 5 January 2005) was an American dramatist, born in Savannah, Georgia, and married to physicist Eugene T. Booth)

The understudy had to take her part in Lavender Ladies in April 1939, but she was back on stage in Passers By that December. On 3 August 1940 director Randall revived an earlier hit, The Rescue Party, by Phyllis Morris. A season of five short plays began on 14 December 1940: Lithuania by Rupert Brooke, F. Keith Manzie's For the Honor of Larratania, Edith Susan Boyd's Three Roses, followed by 'Op o' Me Thumb by Frederick Fenn and Richard Pryce and The Man in the Bowler Hat by A. A. Milne. In April 1941 they played another John Hastings Turner's comedy The Scarlet Lady, while Mitchell produced Sidney Rusk's one-act two-hander Fog as a companion-piece.

In August 1941 she married John Henderson, an RAAF pilot from New Zealand. He was posted missing, presumed killed, in April 1943 while on RAF operations in the Middle East.

In February 1943 she played in Robert Morley's comedy Short Story, produced by Randall at the Little Theatre, then served as his stage manager for Rodney Ackland's Dance With No Music, Henry Allan having been posted overseas with the RAAF. She produced the Little Theatre's first Christmas comedy, Frank Harvey's Saloon Bar, Randall playing a key character, but was back in the director's chair for Lionel Hall's She Passed Through Lorraine in March 1943. In April she had the chief part in Samson Raphaelson's comedy, Skylark In June she produced Marguerite Steen's French for Love, starring Eva Schwarcz, later involved in a very public custody case. In December she produced Reginald Berkeley's comedy The World's End, set in a Dartmoor hotel. In April 1944 she returned to acting, in a highly praised The Day Is Gone by W. Chetham-Strode, then produced Drawing Room by Thomas Browne. In June 1944 Randall and Mitchell were among those non-professional actors castigated by Actors' Equity in continuing to work while their strike was on. In July she played in Randall's production of Lillian Hellman's The Little Foxes, which ran for three weeks; players included Sydney Conabere. Then in August they presented a second play by Australian Alan Burke, Woman Bites Dog, again produced by Randall with stage direction by Mitchell. She produced J. B. Priestley's Eden End in October, and "Gregory Parable", critic for The Advocate, was not surprised at a workmanlike presentation nor for John Van Druten's Old Acquaintance, produced by Randall and directed by Mitchell in December. In February she produced A. J. Cronin's three-act Jupiter Laughs, starring Wilma Harrison, a professional actor looking gain experience. Her next production was Clare Boothe's The Women, a play with twelve scenes and cast of thirty-nine women — again, "Parable" notes, without blemish. For the Christmas season she starred in, and co-produced with Randall, Emlyn Williams' The Wind of Heaven. Her next production, in June 1945, was George Bernard Shaw's The Simpleton of the Unexpected Isles, an "intellectual fantasy", again totally successful. An Australian play with a Chinese theme, Enduring as the Camphor Tree by Russell John Oakes followed in October, hailed by "Parable" as "Australia's first great play". So popular was the production that the usual three-week season was extended by two weeks, and a charity performance for the Brotherhood of St Laurence. Sumner Locke Elliott's The Invisible Circus followed on Boxing Day, 26 December 1946. Jan de Hartog's Skipper Next to God, with an all-male cast, followed in April, then on 28 June the Little Theatre's 120th production, Karel Čapek's The Macropulos Secret opened. Exercise Bowler, written by an anonymous cooperative "T. Atkinson", and depicting two groups fighting over production of a play, followed on 6 September. John Patrick's The Willow and I ran from Boxing Day 1947 and in May 1948 Constance Cox's Vanity Fair, an adaptation of Thackeray's novel, which failed to please one critic. Another Australian premiere was her production of Arthur Miller's All My Sons in August. Noël Coward's Hay Fever followed in October, and was well received. June Brunel (Mrs Helmut Newton) and Diana Bell were especially praised.

In 1948 Melbourne Little Theatre, under director Brett Randall, jointly with the College of Adult Education (CAE) founded Everyman Theatres Pty Ltd, a professional company to bring theatre to Victorian country centres. Their first production was Benn Levy's Springtime for Henry. Mitchell appears not to have any substantial involvement with this company. She did however, in May 1951, direct their production of Miles Malleson's version of Molière's comedy, The Miser its first Australian production.

In July 1949 Mitchell produced the verse play Happy as Larry by Donagh MacDonagh, followed in October by William Douglas Home's Now Barabbas, another Australian premiere. Her New Year's production for 1950 was a "hiss the villain" melodrama — Henning Nelms's Only an Orphan Girl, after which she left for London on a working holiday aboard the Ranchi. She had been sponsored by the British Council to attend an actors' and producers' course, "London and Stratford-on-Avon". On her return in December 1950 she produced Douglas Stewart's Shipwreck, a play which revived Sir Dallas Brooks' interest in little theatre In April 1951 she directed Peter Ustinov's Blow Your Own Trumpet In May she directed R. F. Delderfield's comedy All Over the Town, and in August Guy Bolton's Larger Than Life, based on Somerset Maugham's novel, Theatre.

=== Other activities ===
In 1946 Mitchell produced Richard of Bordeaux for the girls of Toorak College, Frankston.

In 1947 she produced Dorothy L. Sayers' passion play The Just Vengeance at the Melbourne Town Hall for the Methodist Young People's Department in conjunction with the denomination's annual conference. The cast of 40 was bolstered by several professionals, who played anonymously. She produced, for the same organisation, Laurence Housman's, Francis of Assisi (with Brian James in the name part, and music composed by Dorian Le Gallienne) on 1–2 March 1948. She produced Leonid Andreyev's He Who Gets Slapped for the Melbourne University Dramatic Club's 1948 Commencement Play at the Union Theatre,

In March 1949 she was guest adjudicator for the Tasmanian Drama Festival, where nine groups, from across the state, competed for the Catherine Duncan Cup. She was on the examinations board of the Melbourne University Rehabilitation drama course and a member of the Australian Dramatic Art and Education Guild council.

In April 1951 she was appointed State adjudicator at the Commonwealth Jubilee Drama Competition, a festival organised at the instigation of Sydney's British Drama League. The contest took her to Yallourn, Sale, and eight other Victorian country groups and ten from Melbourne, in order to select two semi-finalists. Meanwhile, she also adjudicated at a drama contest staged by the Country Women's Association.

In 1951 she directed the stage show An Aboriginal Moomba: Out of the Dark with an all-Aboriginal cast. also touring regional cities. She has been credited with giving the name to the annual Melbourne festival. She was declared "Queen of Moomba" by Jacob Chirnside, an elder of the Elondalli nation from Queensland, and with Harold Blair, one of the stars of the show.

In November 1951 she produced Christopher Fry's A Phoenix Too Frequent and Oscar Wilde's Salome, with June Brunel and Frank Thring as Herod at Thring's Arrow Theatre (previously Melbourne Repertory Theatre).

=== Children's theatre ===
In 1939 she established a Children's Theatre in association with the Little Theatre.

=== Radio drama ===
Mitchell appeared in many radio plays —

- Vicki Baum's Grand Hotel for 3UZ in 1938
- Priestley's Laburnum Grove, Ian Hay's Housemaster and Pinero's Magistrate and others produced by Edgley and Dawe for 3DB in 1946–1947.

== Other interests ==
She was a keen golfer, loved walking with her dog "Robert the Bruce", attended ballet, and had a large library.

She was a close associate of Betty Pounder.

== Recognition ==
- Mitchell was a recipient of the Lifetime Achievement Award by the Green Room Awards Association.
- The Irene Mitchell Studio, one of two performance spaces at St Martins Youth Arts Centre (built on the site where St Chad's once stood) was named for her. A plaque under the old pepper tree, where she was wont to take a breather, commemorates her involvement.

== Personal ==
On 24 November 1926 Mitchell announced her engagement to Laurie Abrahams of "Newington," Burke Rd, East Malvern. No record of a subsequent marriage has been found. On 22 August 1941 she married Pilot-Officer John Robert Dunlop Henderson (8 October 1915 – 11 April 1943). He was with No. 73 Squadron RAF, lost presumed killed when his Hawker Hurricane aircraft crashed into the sea off Sfax, Tunisia, on 11 April 1943. Her address at the time was 8 St George Rd, Malvern, Victoria, known to her friends as the "slanty shanty".

She had a sister, Vera Pearl Mitchell (born 1907) who married Thomas Hugh O'Halloran in 1931.

== See also ==
Notable women theatre directors and entrepreneurs include:

Australia

- Doris Fitton of the Independent Theatre, Sydney
- Gertrude Johnson of National Theatre Movement
- Kathleen Robinson of Minerva Theatre, Sydney

England

- Lilian Baylis of the Old Vic and Sadler's Wells
- Elsie Bayer of Shakespeare Memorial Theatre at Stratford-on-Avon
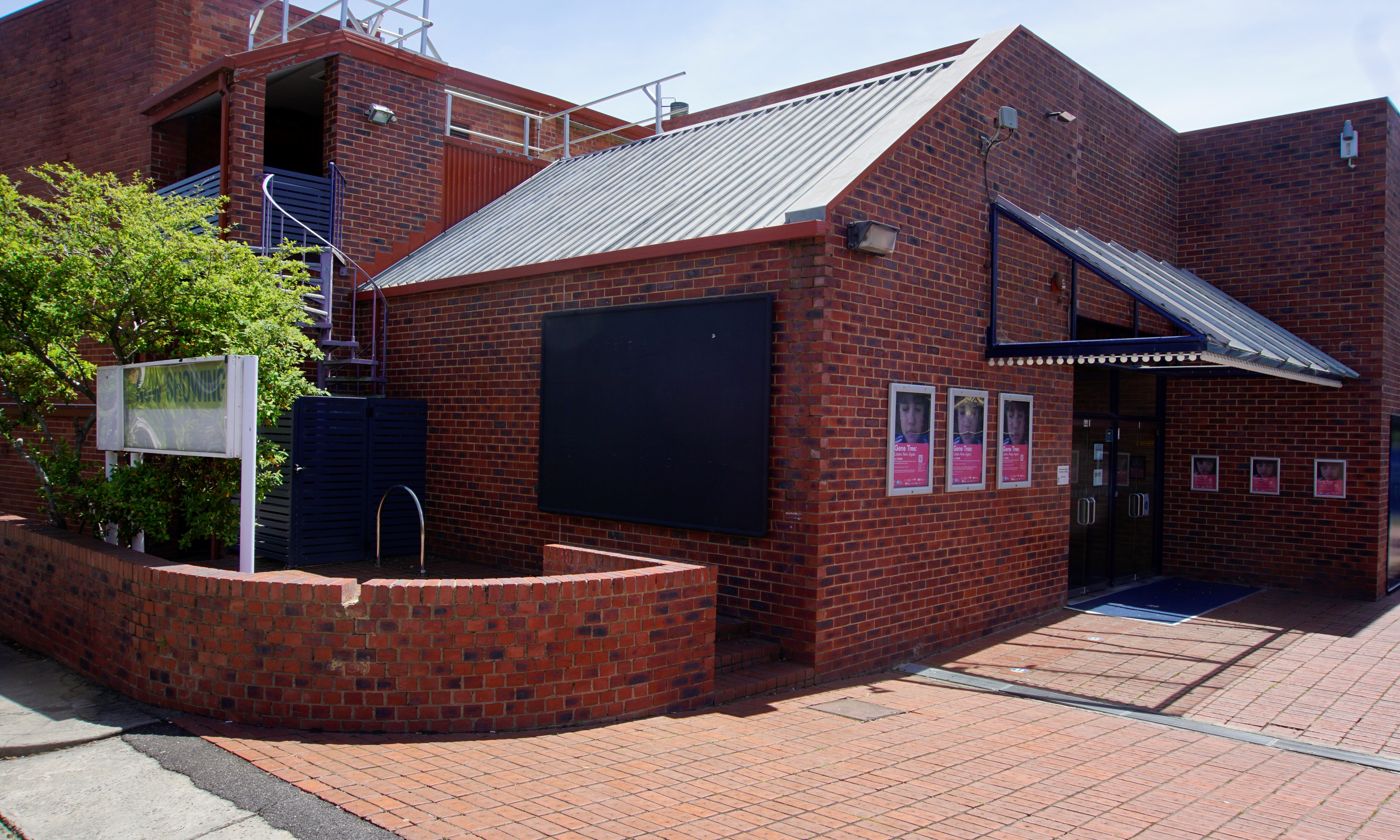
St Martins Youth Arts Centre, South Yarra

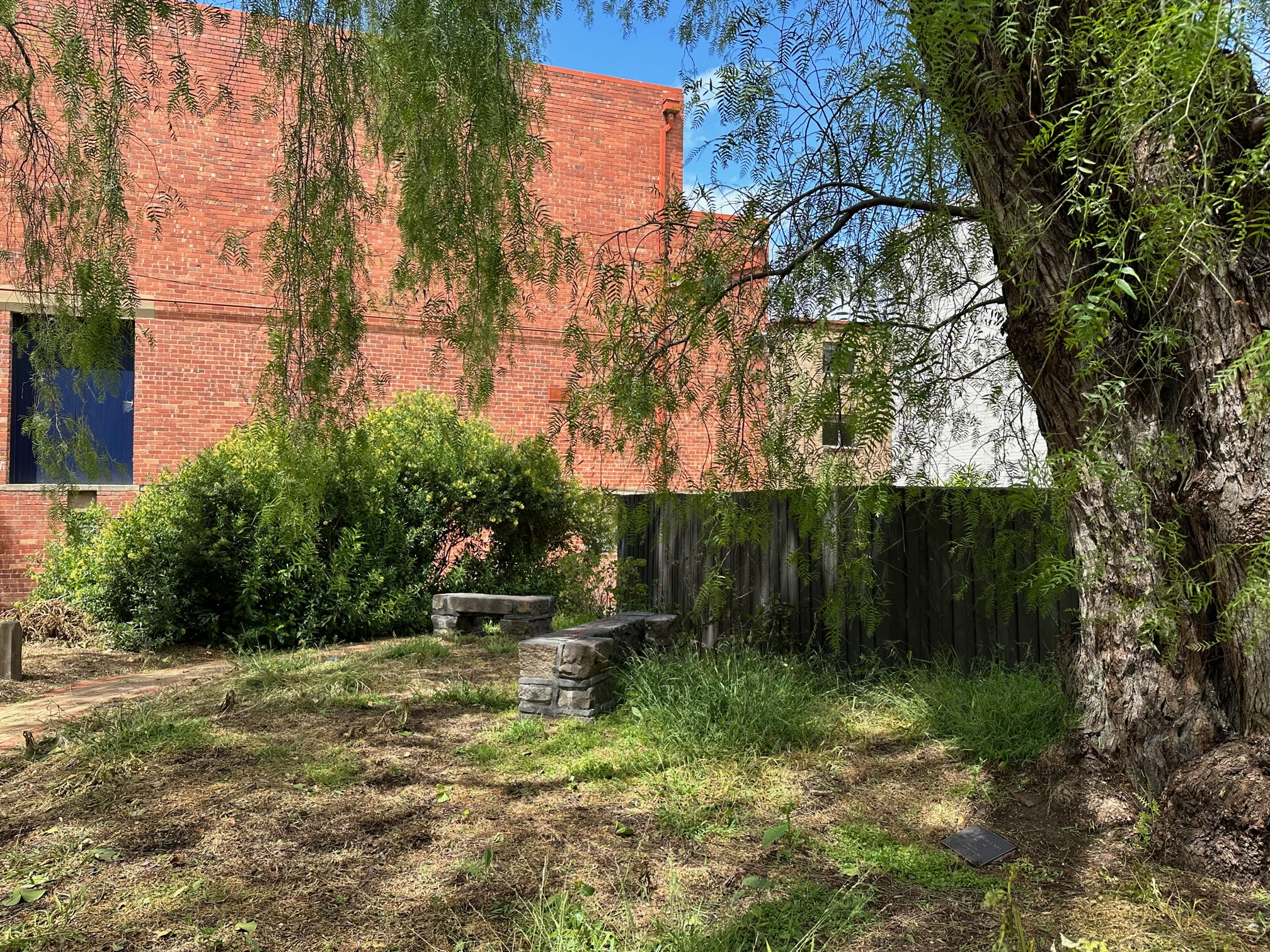
The pepper tree behind St Martins Theatre

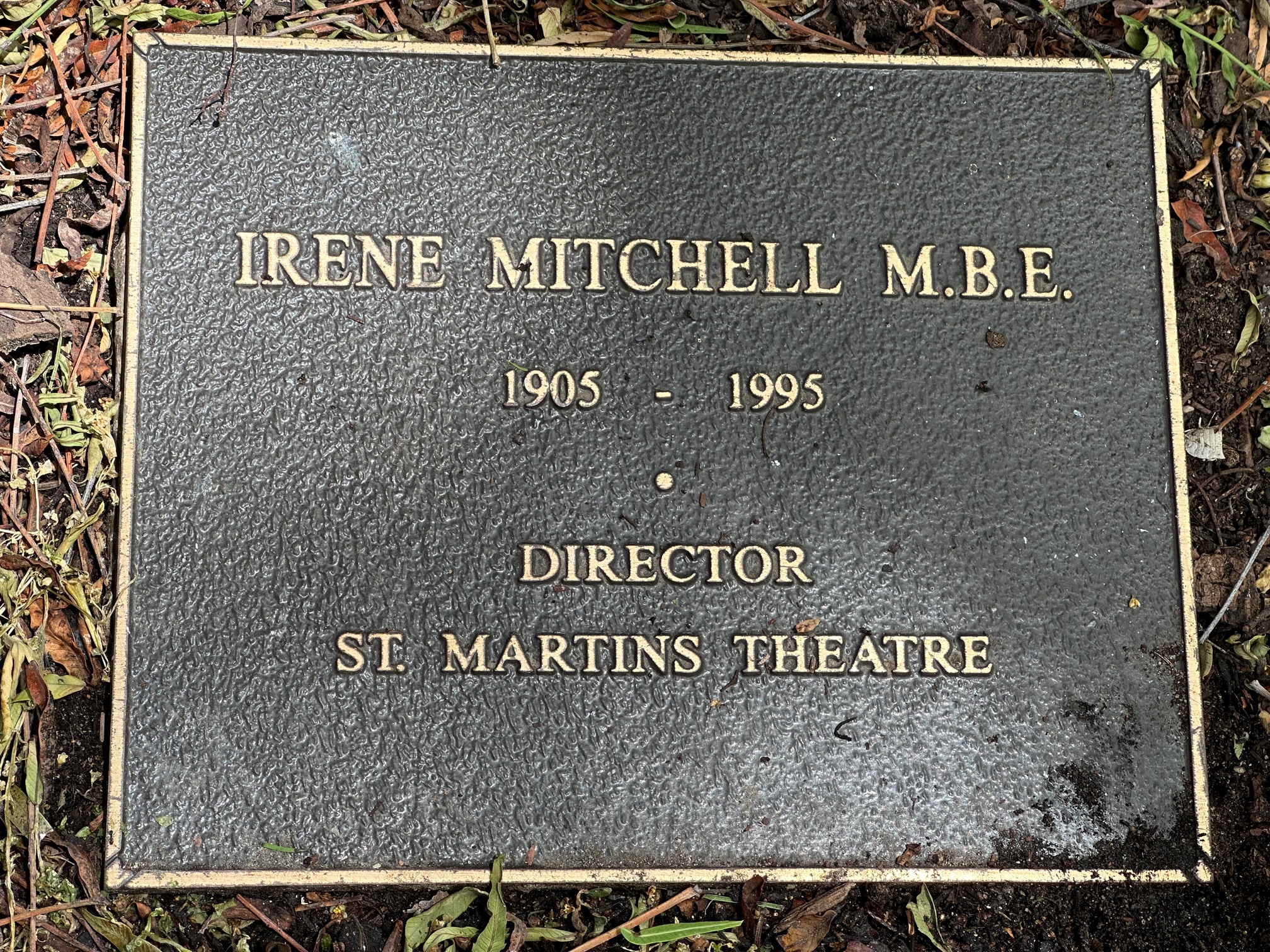
Memorial to Irene Mitchell

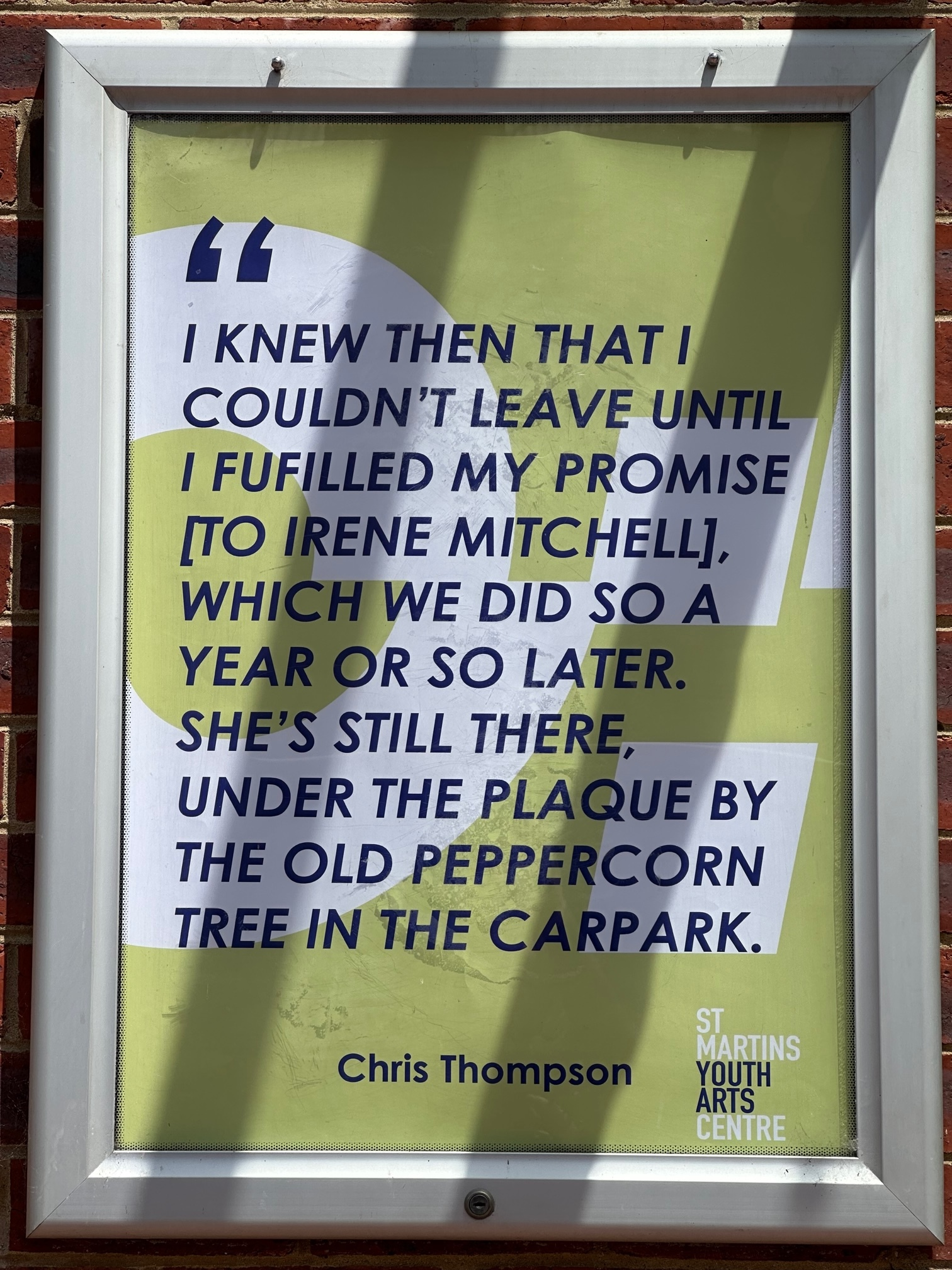
Chris Thompson's memorial to Mitchell
