= Jon Finlayson =

Australian actor (1938–2012)

- Born: Jon Douglas Finlayson; 23 March 1938; Coburg, Victoria, Australia
- Died: 12 September 2012 (aged 74); Fitzroy, Victoria, Australia
- Education: Camberwell High School
- Occupations: Actor; screenwriter; producer; director; singer
- Years active: 1946–2012
- Family: Clorine Finlayson (mother); Ron Finlayson (father); Rhonda Finlayson (sister); Bruce Finlayson (brother); Alexandra Schepisi (niece); Zoe Schepisi (niece)

Jon Douglas Finlayson (23 March 1938–12 September 2012) was an Australian stage and screen character actor, radio performer, writer, director, producer and singer

== Early life ==
Jon Finlayson was born in Coburg, Victoria to Clorine and Ron Finlayson. When he was about age 8 the family moved to Burwood where he attended Hartwell Primary School and Camberwell High School. His performing career began at about the same time when he toured Australia with the Australian Boys' Choir as a soprano.

== Career ==
Finlayson was known for his roles in the films Lonely Hearts (1982) and The Magic Show (1983).

He was also well-known from his numerous television roles, such as Colonel Archibald Spencer in Zoo Family (1985) and as James Gleeson in Snowy River: The McGregor Saga (1995–1996). He wrote sketches for The Mavis Bramston Show. He was noted for his hospitality as well as his 'Sunday Soirees' in the Melbourne show business community.

Finlayson directed, produced, and co-wrote (with Gary Down) The Glitter Sisters.

== Death ==
Finlayson died of prostate cancer aged 74, on 12 September 2012 at St Vincent's Hospital, Melbourne

== Filmography ==
=== Film ===
| Year | Title | Role | Notes |
|---|---|---|---|
| 1973 | Alvin Purple | Liz's Lawyer | Feature film |
| 1974 | Alvin Rides Again | The Magician | Feature film |
| 1975 | The Great Macarthy | Vincent | Feature film |
| 1975 | The Devil in Evening Dress | Federici | Feature film |
| 1976 | Mad Dog Morgan | Extra | Feature film |
| 1976 | The Sentimental Bloke | Mr Smithers | Feature film |
| 1982 | Lonely Hearts | George | Feature film |
| 1983 | The Magic Show | Van Zyskin | Feature film |
| 1984 | Skin Deep | Simpson Byrne | TV movie |
| 1984 | My First Wife | Bernard | Feature film |
| 1984 | Melvin, Son of Alvin | Burnbaum | Feature film |
| 1988 | Evil Angels | Professor Boettcher | Feature film |
| 1989 | Darlings of the Gods | Tyrone Guthrie | TV movie |
| 1990 | A Kink in the Picasso | Lionel | Feature film |
| 1996 | The Inner Sanctuary | Archbishop Clarke | (final film role) |

=== Television ===
| Year | Title | Role | Notes |
|---|---|---|---|
| 1962 | Personally Yours | Himself | TV series |
| 1967 | Hey You! | Basil | TV series, episode 6: "The Party" |
| 1967 | Australian Playhouse | | TV play, season 2, episode 9: The Heat's On |
| 1970 | The Long Arm | | TV series, episode 6: "The Flight of the Chicken" |
| 1970–1975 | Homicide | Karl Arnsen / Bill Sellars / Rupert Morgan / Tibby Hayes | TV series, 4 episodes |
| 1971–1974 | Division 4 | Jonathan Gramophone / Wayne Fraser / Denver Philips / Richard Barry / Mr Hall | TV series, 5 episodes |
| 1972 | Matlock Police | Alex Bell / Brendan | TV series, season 2, 2 episodes |
| 1973 | Ryan | Smith | TV series, episode 16: "Nobody's Perfect" |
| 1975 | Cash and Company | Travers Lewis | Miniseries, episode 4: "Golden Girl" |
| 1975 | The Last of the Australians | Mr Flannagan | TV series, season 2, episode 2: "The Compleat Works" |
| 1979 | Skyways | Bruno | TV series, season 1, episode 43: "Flight 89" |
| 1979–1980 | Cop Shop | Maurice Pearson / Leslie Sampson | TV series, 3 episodes |
| 1984 | Special Squad | Devonport | TV series, episode 11: "The Set-Up" |
| 1984 | Carson's Law | David Spencer | TV series, 6 episodes |
| 1985 | Zoo Family | Colonel Archibald Spencer | TV series, 26 episodes |
| 1985–1986 | Neighbours | Brian Hanson / Audition Director | TV series, 3 episodes |
| 1989 | Space Knights | Sir Ralph Retro | Puppetry TV series |
| 1989 | The Power, The Passion | William Somerset | TV series |
| 1991 | The Flying Doctors | Specialist | TV series, season 8, episode 9: "Swinging on the Rope" |
| 1991 | Boys from the Bush | Travel Agent | TV series, 2 episodes |
| 1993 | Newlyweds | Photographer | TV series, season 1, episode 2: "The Wedding Machine" |
| 1995–1996 | Snowy River: The McGregor Saga | James Gleeson | TV series, 28 episodes |

== Theatre ==
=== As actor ===
| Year | Title | Role | Venue / Co. |
|---|---|---|---|
| 1956 | Up and Atom | | University of Melbourne |
| 1957 | Camino Real | Jacques Casanova | University of Melbourne |
| 1957 | The Matchmaker | Rudolph | University of Melbourne |
| 1957 | Speak of the Devil | | University of Melbourne |
| 1958 | Lola Montez | Mac | University of Melbourne |
| 1958 | Bells are Ringing | | Princess Theatre, Melbourne |
| 1959 | Auntie Mame | | Theatre Royal, Adelaide, Theatre Royal Sydney with J. C. Williamson |
| 1960 | Frenzy | | National Theatre, East Melbourne |
| 1960 | Festival Faces Intimate Revue | | Willard Hall, Adelaide with Independent Repertory Incorporated |
| 1961 | Lock Up Your Daughters | | Princess Theatre, Melbourne, Palace Theatre, Sydney, Theatre Royal, Adelaide, Capitol Theatre, Perth |
| 1962 | Outrageous Fortune | Presenter / Performer | Arrow Theatre, Melbourne |
| 1962 | The Fantasticks | The Old Actor | Russell Street Theatre, Melbourne |
| 1963 | The Man Who Came to Dinner | | Russell Street Theatre, Melbourne |
| 1964 | Who's for Culture | | National Theatrette, Melbourne |
| 1966 | Robert and Elizabeth | A Pickpocket | Princess Theatre, Melbourne, Tivoli Theatre, Sydney |
| 1968 | Razza-Ma-Tazz (and All That Jazz) | The Ponce | Southland Auditorium, Melbourne with Southland Theatre Company |
| 1970 | Enter a Free Man | | St Martins Theatre, Melbourne |
| 1971 | The School for Scandal | | Theatre Royal, Hobart |
| 1972 | The Wakefield Plays | | Hobart City Hall |
| 1972 | Don't Walk Around Stark Naked | Ventroux | St Martins Theatre, Melbourne |
| 1972 | Patrick Pearse Motel | | St Martins Theatre, Melbourne |
| 1972 | Fortune and Men's Eyes | Queenie | St Martins Theatre, Melbourne |
| 1973 | Cowardy Custard | | St Martins Theatre, Melbourne |
| 1973 | Jesus Christ Superstar | King Herod | Sydney |
| 1975 | The Magic Show | Feldman | Princess Theatre, Melbourne |
| 1976 | Crossing Niagara | | Victorian College of Arts, Melbourne with MTC |
| 1976 | Arden | | Russell Street Theatre with MTC |
| 1977 | Ashes | Doctor / Seminologist ('Guru') / Gynaecological Surgeon / Ambulance Driver / Area Adoptions Officer | Russell Street Theatre, Melbourne with MTC |
| 1977 | The Rocky Horror Show | Frank-N-Furter | Warner Theatre, Adelaide with Harry M. Miller |
| 1979 | No Room for Sentiment | | ABC Radio Hobart |
| 1979 | Knock, Knock | | ABC Radio Hobart |
| 1985 | Trumpets and Raspberries | Inspector | Playhouse, Melbourne with MTC |
| 1989 | Better Known as Bee | | Comedy Theatre, Melbourne with Global Consolidated |
| 1993 | A Matinee Season with Noel Coward without Noel Coward | | Playhouse, Melbourne, Australian tour, Melbourne Zoo |
| 1997 | Underneath the Arches | | Victorian regional tour |
| 1997 | Mad Dogs and Finlayson | | Capers Cabaret, Melbourne |
| 1997 | Aladdin | | Capers Cabaret, Melbourne |
| 1998 | The Piccadilly Bushman | Vincent Franklin | Malthouse Theatre, Melbourne with Playbox Theatre Company |

=== As director / producer ===
| Year | Title | Role | Venue / Co. |
|---|---|---|---|
| 1960 | Paton's Place | Director | Melbourne |
| 1962 | East Lynne | Director | Old Dolphin Theatre, Perth |
| 1962 | Outrageous Fortune | Co-writer / Producer | Arrow Theatre, Melbourne |
| | Slings & Arrows | Co-writer | Arrow Theatre, Melbourne |
| 1962 | Don't Make Waves | Writer / Wardrobe Designer / Producer | Arrow Theatre, Melbourne |
| 1963 | Where Do We Go From Here? | Creator | St Martins Theatre, Melbourne |
| 1963 | To Hell With Culture | Playwright | National Theatrette, Melbourne |
| 1967 | Nothing To Do With It | Director | 27A Theatre, Melbourne |
| 1971 | Orpheus in the Underworld | Director | Theatre Royal, Hobart, Princess Theatre, Launceston with The Theatre Royal Light Opera Company |
| 1972 | The Computer / Love Travelling Salesman | Director | AMP Theatre, Adelaide |
| 1972 | The Beggar’s Opera | Director | Theatre Royal, Hobart with The Theatre Royal Light Opera Company |
| 1973; 1974 | Red, White and Boogie | Director | Le Chat Noir Theatre Restaurant, Melbourne, Twelfth Night Theatre, Brisbane |
| 1974 | Sweet Fanny Adams | Designer / Director | Le Chat Noir Theatre Restaurant, Melbourne with Jon Finlayson Productions |
| 1975 | The Shoemaker and the Elves | Director | Monash University, Melbourne with The Alexander Theatre Company |
| 1975–1979 | The Glitter Sisters | Director | Chevron Hotel, Melbourne, Oscar's Hollywood Palace Theatre Restaurant, Sydney, Theatre Royal, Hobart, Civic Theatre, Burnie, Princess Theatre, Launceston, Melbourne |
| 1976 | Pirates at the Barn | Director | Princess Theatre, Melbourne |
| 1977 | The Fall Guy | Choreographer | Russell Street Theatre with MTC |
| 1979 | The New Moon | Director | Theatre Royal, Hobart with The Theatre Royal Light Opera Company |
| 1982 | Sad Song | Director | Magic Mirror Theatre, Perth |
| 1993 | A Matinee Season with Noel Coward without Noel Coward | Devisor | Playhouse, Melbourne, Australian tour, Melbourne Zoo |
| 1997 | Mad Dogs and Finlayson | Devisor | Capers Cabaret, Melbourne |
| 1997 | Come Up and See Me Sometime | Director | Capers Cabaret, Melbourne |
