= Centre for Adult Education =

Location
- Melbourne, Victoria; Australia
- Coordinates: 37.816941°S 144.965841°E

Information
- Established: 1947
- Website: cae.edu.au

The Centre for Adult Education (CAE), founded in 1947 as the Council of Adult Education, is an adult education institution based in Victoria, Australia. It runs short courses and nationally recognised training, as well as a Victorian Certificate of Education (VCE) program. It is a statutory authority under the Education and Training Reform Act 2006. It is partly funded by the state government's Adult Community and Further Education Division.

== Theatre ==
In 1948 the CAE, in conjunction with Melbourne Little Theatre led by Brett Randall, founded "Everyman Theatres Pty Ltd", a touring company managed by Max Bruch, which took high-class plays to country centres.

== Notable staff ==
- Colin Badger (1906–1993), director, Council of Adult Education
- Margaret Geddes – editing and non-fiction teacher (2011–present); writer, journalist, historian
