= Moomba =

Moomba may refer to:

- Moomba Festival, a Labour Day festival in Melbourne, Australia
- Moomba, South Australia, a town
- Moomba (constituency), a constituency of the National Assembly of Zambia

== See also ==
- An Aboriginal Moomba: Out of the Dark, a 1951 Australian theatrical performance
