= Purga Aboriginal Cemetery =

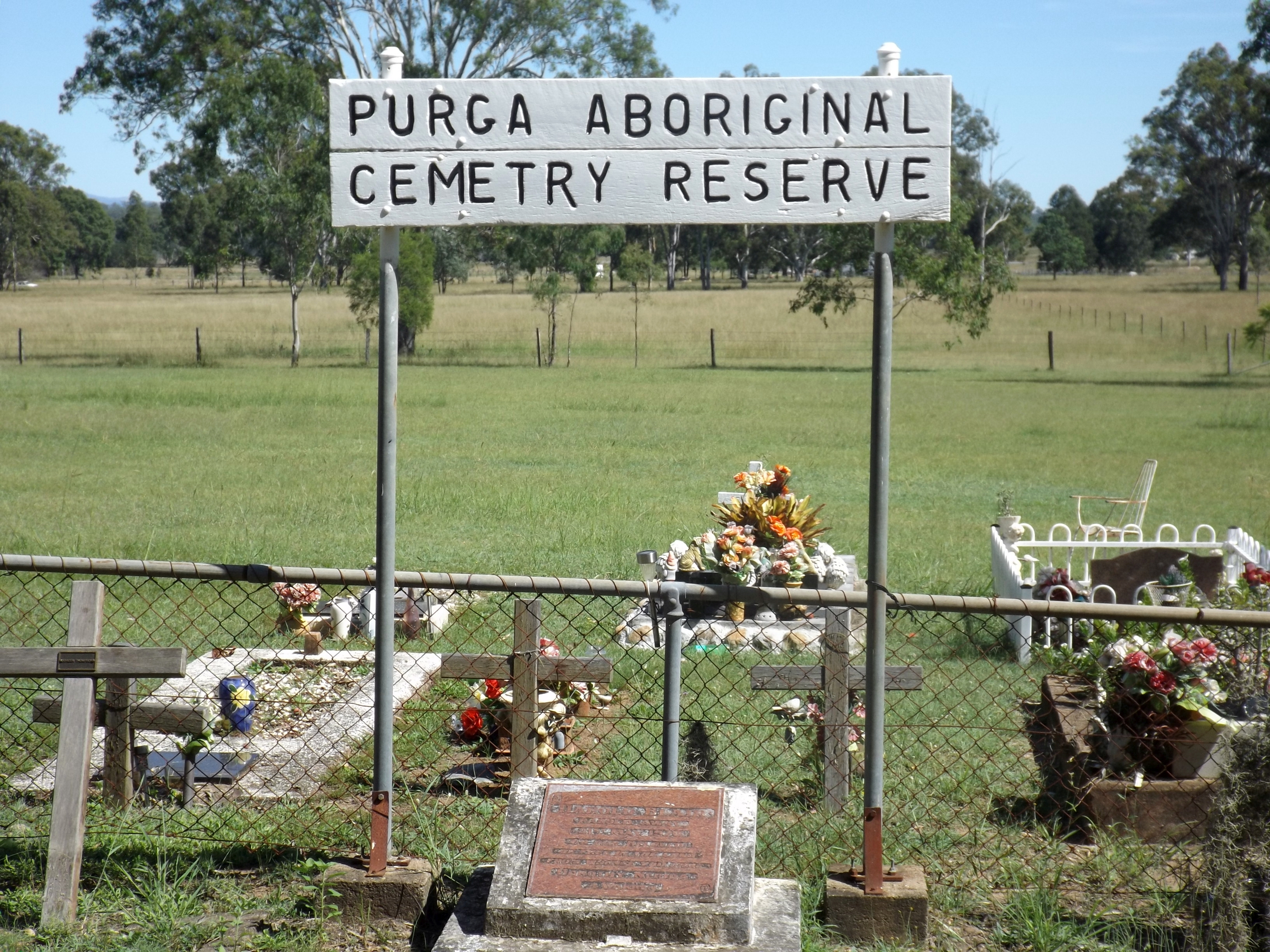
- Purga Aboriginal Cemetery

- Location within Queensland Location within Australia
- 27.7198°S 152.7512°E
- Location: Carmichaels Road, Purga, City of Ipswich, Queensland, Australia

History
- Design period: 1900 - 1914 (early 20th century)

Queensland Heritage Register
- Official name: Purga Aboriginal Cemetery
- Type: state heritage (built, landscape)
- Designated: 18 September 2008
- Reference no.: 602434
- Significant period: c. 1914-1948
- Significant components: burial/grave, cemetery, well, headstone

Purga Aboriginal Cemetery is a heritage-listed cemetery at Carmichaels Road, Purga, City of Ipswich, Queensland, Australia. It was added to the Queensland Heritage Register on 18 September 2008.

== History ==
Purga Creek Aboriginal Mission comprised areas of land gazetted for Aboriginal purposes from 1892 until they were rescinded in 1948. The first area of land to be gazetted was R.177 situated about 8 kilometres (5.0 mi) south of Ipswich in an area referred to as Purga Creek (South). Buildings and structures associated with the Purga Creek Mission site no longer exist. The cemetery, gazetted in 1968 but in use much earlier, retains a long association with the Purga Creek Aboriginal Mission with the earliest marked grave dating from 1918 a few years after the establishment of the mission.

The Purga Creek Aboriginal Mission was established in 1914 as a self-supporting farm and a training venture for future employment and remained so until 1948 when the mission closed. At the time the buildings were described as being dilapidated with better facilities available at other State Aboriginal settlements. The closure of the mission also ended a 27-year association of the Salvation Army with the place.

An earlier mission had been established at Deebing Creek in 1892 following the selection by the Aboriginal Protection Society of a suitable site to accommodate Aborigines. Set up in Ipswich by a group of businessmen and women, in 1889 the society was taken over by members of various local church groups. A particular concern of the society was the accessibility of alcohol by the Aborigines. Deebing Creek was a place of residence and work for missionaries and Aboriginal people until 1914 until when the mission moved to Purga Creek. During the period of time when the mission was located at Deebing Creek, R.177 (now known as Lot 219 RP858789) was referred to as the farm at the Nine Mile or the Nine Mile Reserve, with farm produce supporting the Deebing Creek Mission.

One of the first to complain about the suitability of the Deebing Creek Mission site, and the absence of fertile land, was Archibald Meston. In 1897, under the provisions of the Aboriginal Protection and Restriction of the Sale of Opium Act 1897, Meston was appointed Protector of Aborigines for south Queensland. Under the act, the lives of Aboriginal people became increasingly controlled by the State, providing for the establishment of government-run reserves, provision for the removal of Aborigines to reserves, provided for written agreements for the employment of Aborigines as well as controlling the residence, movement, employment and wages of Aboriginal people.

In September 1901 an area of 112 acres (45 ha) was gazetted as a temporary Reserve for Aborigines. This was much the same parcel of land gazetted in January 1892 (R.177) though slightly smaller in area. By 1910 several acres of the Nine Mile Reserve had been cleared and stumped and twelve acres had been placed under crop. By 1913, when trying to operate the Nine Mile farm from Deebing Creek became increasingly difficult, a move to Purga Creek about 4 kilometres (2.5 mi) south of Deebing Creek was proposed. This move was also thought necessary to minimise the temptation for Aboriginal people to obtain alcohol from Ipswich.

In 1914 the Committee governing the Deebing Creek Mission purchased a small farm of 62 acres (25 ha) close to the Nine Mile Reserve at Purga, as a site for the proposed relocated mission settlement. This is understood to be portion 60 (now Lot 60 on CC1433) located between Purga Creek to the west and the Ipswich-Boonah Road and Fassifern branch railway to the east, just west of the Nine Mile Reserve. Apart from the convenient proximity to the railway, the new site provided space for the erection of increased dormitory and storage accommodation as well as extra cultivation.

Most of the cost of relocation was met by the Queensland Government with £200 being approved towards the cost of removing and re-erecting the principal buildings (including the school) from the old site at Deebing Creek to the new Purga Homestead. Opportunity was taken to discard the old system of slab huts and to erect, utilising inmates' labour, new, neat timber cottages on stumps, to receive the families transferred from Deebing Creek. These cottages were aligned around three sides of a square paddock of about six acres, and could be closely supervised from the official quarters. The resident mission population rose to 85 that year.

Aboriginal children and adults from all over the State - from North Queensland and as far west as Charleville - were sent to Purga Creek Mission. Aboriginal people who were sent to reserves away from their traditional lands are known as historical people. The reserves which became their homes were the traditional lands of other groups, but the State authorities did not take this cultural aspect into account in removing people from place to place. Nonetheless reserves such as Purga Creek Mission became home to those who were sent there by Aboriginal Protectors.

In 1915 there was 20 acres (8.1 ha) of land under cultivation at Purga Creek, sufficient produce had been grown both to provide for the mission and to sell locally, and the mission had produced prize winning herds of pigs, dairy and beef cattle.

In 1920 the Salvation Army, which appeared to have had some involvement, perhaps from a temperance and charitable aspect, with the Purga Creek Mission from the early mission days, was approached by the Queensland Government to take control of the site. The Salvation Army accepted and made immediate improvements, including construction of a large school hall, a dining hall for the orphans, repairs to the girl's dormitory and conversion of the old school into a boy's dormitory. The Salvation Army used the term "colony" instead of "mission". The War Cry reported the official function of the opening of the Aboriginal Colony in January 1921. When the Salvation Army took over there was accommodation for 40 boys and girls and room for 100 Colonists.

The Reports of the Aboriginal Department over the years in relation to Purga were brief, mainly stating the number of orphan children maintained at the Purga Industrial School, an aspect of the Salvation Army work, and an update on the agricultural operation. In 1933 it was stated that a well was sunk in the village. This is the first time the word "village" is used in connection with Purga Mission. There appeared to be encouragement of the cultivation of private gardens by Aboriginal residents. Whilst archival records for Purga Creek are sparse between 1914 until about 1935, reports from the interwar period show that married couples and their families were encouraged to live in their own huts on the mission and cook for themselves from weekly rations. Orphaned children and unmarried adults resided in dormitories. The Aboriginal men worked on the farm or went out to work.

By the mid-1940s with a decreasing population and with buildings deteriorating a Visiting Justice, JJ Leahy wrote to the Under Secretary of the Department of Health and Home Affairs in January 1947 regarding the poor state of the buildings at Purga. The Salvation Army requested urgent repairs to the buildings at Purga Mission buildings in April 1947. The brief report on the Purga Mission in 1947 showed that renovations and improvements had been made to the buildings. A total of ten children were then at the mission.

In 1948 the Director of Native Affairs indicated that Purga Mission was to be closed, the official date of closure being 30 June 1948, which is also the date of the school's closure. The total number of residents was seven. The children were sent to other Aboriginal Settlements. The Land Administration Board was to take over all the land and improvements within the Mission Reserve, apart from the church building, which was to be left to the disposal of the Salvation Army. The proclamation to rescind a number of reserves including R.177 appeared in the Queensland Government Gazette in December 1948.

In March 1968 a Reserve for an Aboriginal Cemetery (R. 841), under the control of the Director of Aboriginal and Island Affairs as trustee, was proclaimed. An area of one acre (Lot 217 CP858790) was excised from the original R.177 (now lot 219 on RP858789). The earliest marked headstone dates to 1918, indicating that the cemetery was in use from the earliest years of the Purga Creek Mission.

In May 2002 an article headed "Indigenous community mourns elder" appeared in The Courier-Mail recording the death of Brisbane elder Aunty Janey Arnold, a long-time Indigenous rights and equity campaigner. Aunty Janey was born about 1908 in an Aboriginal camp site on the outskirts of Mitchell. When she was one, Aunty Janey's family was moved to Deebing Creek Mission outside Ipswich and later moved to the nearby Purga Creek Mission. Auntey Janey was buried in the Purga Aboriginal Cemetery.

Harold Blair, the world-renowned tenor, was the most famous of Purga Creek Mission residents, being brought to Purga when he was 3 months old and stayed until he finished his schooling at 17 years of age. When he died in 1976 a memorial service was held at the Purga Aboriginal Cemetery and his ashes were scattered at that site.

== Description ==
The Purga Aboriginal Cemetery is located approximately 15 kilometres (9.3 mi) south of Ipswich City along the Ipswich-Boonah Road. A signpost at Carmichaels Road (off the Ipswich-Boonah Road) marks the turn-off to the cemetery, following Carmichaels Road approximately one kilometre to a right hand turn and travelling approximately 100 metres (330 ft) to access the cemetery driveway. A recent amenities block has been constructed in the south- west corner of the reserve. This is not considered to be of cultural heritage significance.

The whole area is one hectare with a smaller portion within the reserve fenced off with a chain wire fence and gate. This fenced off portion has a number of early marble headstones, one dating to 1918. Other graves within the fenced off portion are marked by simple timber crucifixes and low-set concrete headstones. The grave of Aunty Janey Arnold is located in the fenced off portion. A number of graves are located in the larger area of the reserve outside the small fenced portion. These graves are marked in various ways including simple timber crucifixes with small brass plaques and concrete surrounds and more elaborate granite headstones. A timber sign in the south-west corner reads "DOREEN THOMPSON MEMORIAL CEMETERY".

== Heritage listing ==
Purga Aboriginal Cemetery was listed on the Queensland Heritage Register on 18 September 2008 having satisfied the following criteria.

The place is important in demonstrating the evolution or pattern of Queensland's history.

Purga Aboriginal Cemetery is important in illustrating the pattern of Queensland's history as it is connected to the establishment of the Purga Aboriginal Mission in the area in 1914 when the mission moved to Purga Creek from Deebing Creek. Whilst the mission closed in 1948 the cemetery remains open and has had recent burials. The cemetery is a physical reminder of the practice of isolating Aboriginal people from the mainstream Queensland community in the early twentieth century.

The place has a strong or special association with a particular community or cultural group for social, cultural or spiritual reasons.

Purga Aboriginal Cemetery is important as a place of ritual and ceremony having a strong association with the Aboriginal community associated with Purga Creek Mission, established in 1914. The cemetery is the resting place for the Aboriginal people from the Purga Creek Mission and their descendants, including Aboriginal people who were moved to Purga Creek from other areas around Queensland, and who are known as "historical" people.
