= Purga United Church =

Church in Queensland, Australia

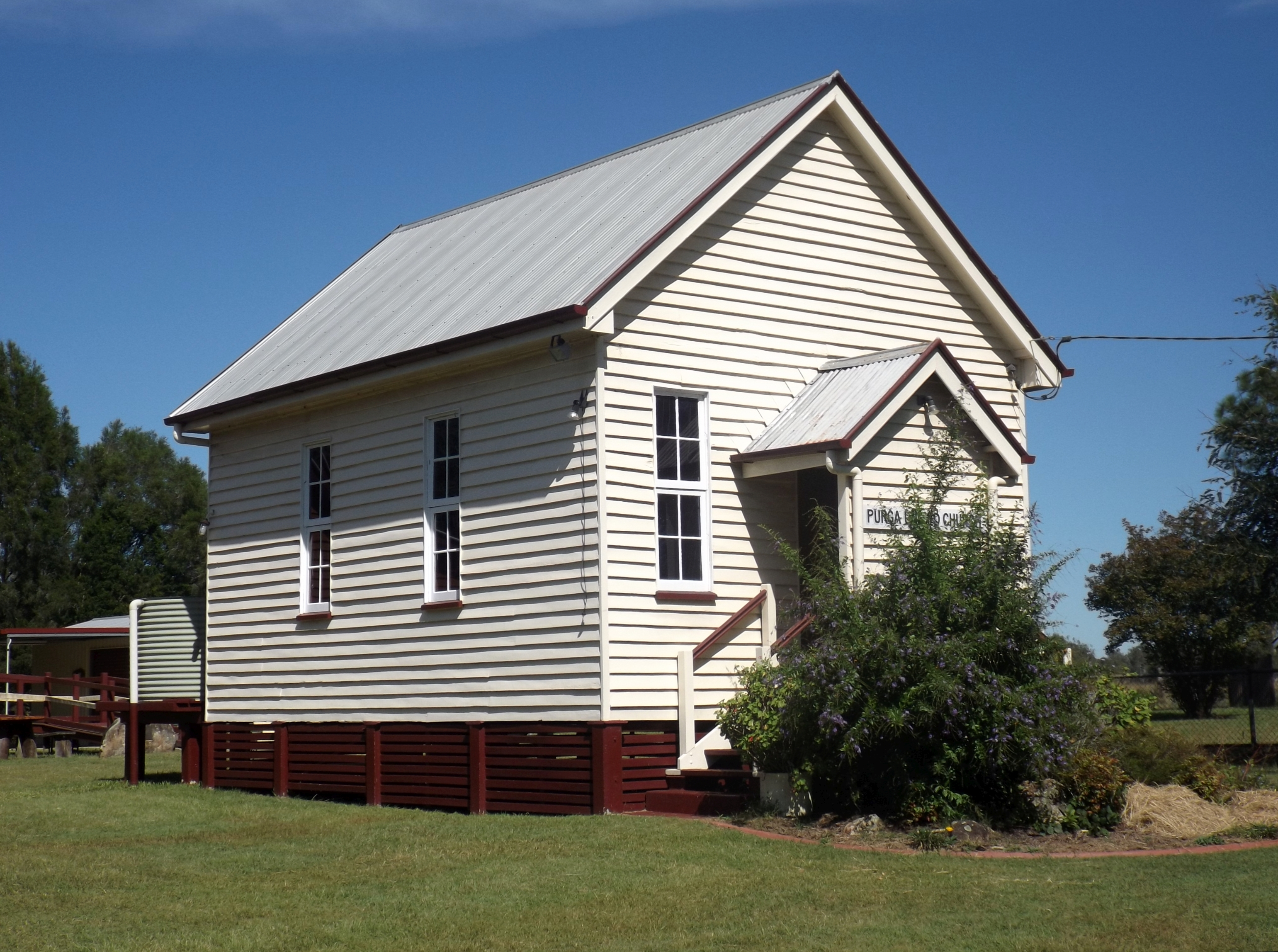
- Purga United Church, 2015

- Location within Queensland Location within Australia
- 27.7124°S 152.7323°E
- Location: Boonah Road, Purga, City of Ipswich, Queensland, Australia

History
- Design period: 1919 - 1930s (interwar period)
- Built: 1922

Queensland Heritage Register
- Official name: Purga United Church
- Type: state heritage (built)
- Designated: 6 September 2005
- Reference no.: 601616
- Significant period: 1920s-1960s (historical) ongoing (social)
- Significant components: furniture/fittings, church

Purga United Church is a heritage-listed union church at Boonah Road, Purga, City of Ipswich, Queensland, Australia. It was built in 1922. It was added to the Queensland Heritage Register on 6 September 2005.

== History ==
The Purga United Church is important in demonstrating the pattern of Queensland's history. The community at Purga developed during the 1860s, opening its first school in 1871. The church was built as a non-denominational church in late 1922. Union churches were more typical in earlier Queensland rural communities. They were built as a means of dealing with the challenges of a small population of mixed religion and a shortage of clergy. The construction of a union church at Purga at such a late stage in the development of Queensland is unusual.

The church demonstrates an uncommon aspect of Queensland's cultural heritage. It is a rare, intact example of a purpose built union church that continues to function as such. The church was built and maintained by voluntary contributions from members of several denominations in the district and clergy from different religions led combined services. Though no longer held weekly, multi-denominational religious services continue to be held on special occasions.

The building demonstrates the principal characteristics of a multi-denominational church. It has many design features that are typical of simple rural churches including a steeply pitched roof and a pulpit. There is a notable absence of religious symbols or icons that would link it to a particular denomination. Most of the existing features of the building, including the church organ are reputedly original.

The building has a strong association with the community at Purga for social and spiritual reasons. It has been valued by the Purga community and has functioned as its spiritual centre for over eighty years. Multiple generations of families still living in the district have worshipped at the church. After changed circumstances rendered its tenure less secure, the Friends of Purga Association moved the church to its present location in 1995 because they feared its loss.

== Description ==
The church is a small building set about 13 metres (43 ft) back from the front of an open grassy block, comprising 1746 square metres, facing Purga School Road. It is positioned about five metres from the western boundary. A second building, the Purga Federation Community Cultural Centre (opened in 2001) is located at the rear eastern corner. Access to the block is gained through a gate facing Purga School Road or from a gate into the adjoining school property.

The form of the church is very simple. It is a small building, rectangular in plan, about eight metres long and five and a half metres wide. The design is functional; there is an absence of external decorative features. The lack of any obvious Christian iconography is notable. Concrete stumps have been used to replace the original timber and elevate the building to a height of approximately one metre. The space between the floor of the church and the ground is in filled with horizontal planks. The structure is timber framed and clad with weatherboard. All of the windows are tall pivoted sash windows. Each of these is divided into two frames, one on top of the other. Each frame is divided into four lights made of clear glass. The bottom frame of each window pivots about a horizontal axis in the middle of the frame. Access at the front of the building is via a porch and a set of double, ledge and brace timber doors. At the rear access is via a simple wooden door. It has an unpainted, corrugated iron, gabled roof pitched at about 45 degrees. The church is finished in white paint.

One of the narrow sides of the building faces the street. The entrance porch is located on this side. It is raised to the same height as the rest of the building and projects from the center of the elevation. Access to the porch is gained through two openings on either side, each with a set of steps. It has a gabled roof pitched at about 45 degrees. A window opens on each side of the porch. It is unlined and has a fibro floor.

The two side elevations are identical. Each has windows spaced equally along its length. Rear access is via a wooden ledge and brace door at the left end of the rear elevation. A set of steps lead to the door. The only window in the rear wall opens slightly to the right of center. Unlike the others, this window has a red corrugated iron awning. A green corrugated iron water tank and tank stand is positioned at the right end of the rear elevation.

The interior of the church comprises a single room that is unlined and unpainted with the exception of the window frames, which are finished in coloured varnish. The timber floor is bare, except for a long narrow carpet extending the length of the room along the center. A small wooden platform and pulpit are against the wall opposite the main entrance. The central part of the pulpit is about one and a half metres high. It consists of two square section posts joined with timber paneling. The bottom section of paneling comprises two vertical recessed panels. The top half consists of a single panel extending the full width of the central part of the pulpit. This panel is decorated with fretwork depicting an elliptical radiant sun motif surrounded by a floral pattern. Blue felt fabric is fixed to the rear of the panel and shows through the openings in the fretwork. On top of this is a book rest inclined at approximately twenty degrees and finished in blue felt fabric. Two shorter square section posts are set back from the front of the platform about one metre from each side of the central section of the pulpit. Each of them is joined to the central section by two wooden rails.

The church is furnished with rows of plain wooden pews. The old wooden organ reputedly dates from the opening of the church. The white glass light fittings are also reputedly original. A more recent fluorescent light is fitted along a beam above the pulpit. Framed historic photographs and a clock of recent manufacture are hung on the walls.

There are three gardens in the grounds. At the front western corner of the block, there is a memorial garden dedicated to Helen Kay Aquilina. There is a small landscaped garden, edged with concrete, in front of the church porch and another garden near the entrance to the Purga Federation Community Cultural Centre at the rear of the block. Two benches are positioned along the western side of the church and another next to the memorial gardens. A chain wire fence surrounds the grounds.

== Heritage listing ==
Purga United Church was listed on the Queensland Heritage Register on 6 September 2005 having satisfied the following criteria.

The place is important in demonstrating the evolution or pattern of Queensland's history.

The Purga United Church is important in demonstrating the pattern of Queensland's history. The community at Purga developed during the 1860s, opening its first school in 1871. The church was built as a non-denominational church in late 1922. Union churches were more typical in earlier Queensland rural communities. They were built as a means of dealing with the challenges of a small population of mixed religion and a shortage of clergy. The construction of a union church at Purga at such a late stage in the development of Queensland is unusual.

The place demonstrates rare, uncommon or endangered aspects of Queensland's cultural heritage.

The church demonstrates an uncommon aspect of Queensland's cultural heritage. It is a rare, intact example of a purpose built union church that continues to function as such. The church was built and maintained by voluntary contributions from members of several denominations in the district and clergy from different religions led combined services. Though no longer held weekly, multi-denominational religious services continue to be held on special occasions.

The place is important in demonstrating the principal characteristics of a particular class of cultural places.

The building demonstrates the principal characteristics of a multi-denominational church. It has many design features that are typical of simple rural churches including a steeply pitched roof and a pulpit. There is a notable absence of religious symbols or icons that would link it to a particular denomination. Most of the existing features of the building, including the church organ are reputedly original.

The place has a strong or special association with a particular community or cultural group for social, cultural or spiritual reasons.

The building has a strong association with the community at Purga for social and spiritual reasons. It has been valued by the Purga community and has functioned as its spiritual centre for over eighty years. Multiple generations of families still living in the district have worshipped at the church. After changed circumstances rendered its tenure less secure, the Friends of Purga Association moved the church to its present location in 1995 because they feared its loss.
