= Hunter Watts =

British socialist activist

John Hunter Watts (1853–1923), known as Hunter Watts, was a British socialist activist.

Based in Manchester, Watts was an active secularist before joining the Social Democratic Federation (SDF). While he was friendly with William Morris, he remained with the SDF when Morris left to found the Socialist League in 1885. He then became treasurer of the SDF, and was a notable figure in the organisation's major 1886 demonstration against unemployment. During the late 1880s, he was the group's organiser in Manchester.

Watts was elected to the reorganised Executive of the SDF in 1895, serving for one year, then again from 1902 to 1906. He spoke in favour of socialist Sunday schools, and published State Maintenance for School Children in 1904. In 1906, he was a leading opponent of proposals to affiliate the SDF to the Independent Labour Party. He served on the executive again in 1911, and remained with the group as it became the British Socialist Party. He opposed the toleration of syndicalists within the membership of the new organisation.

Always loyal to SDF leader H. M. Hyndman, Watts joined his pro-war split in 1916, the National Socialist Party. His daughter, Frediswyde Hunter-Watts, became an actress, achieving acclaim in Australia. with her husband Allan Wilkie.

Party political offices
Preceded by William Morris	Treasurer of the Social Democratic Federation; 1885–1890s	Succeeded by J. F. Green
