= Arrow Theatre =

Coordinates: 37.8500°S 144.9650°E

The Arrow Theatre was an Australian theatre in the Melbourne suburb of Middle Park. It was located at 1–3 Armstrong Street, opposite the Middle Park railway station (a tram stop since electrification). It seated only 200 persons but had a stage large enough for ambitious productions.

== Preface ==
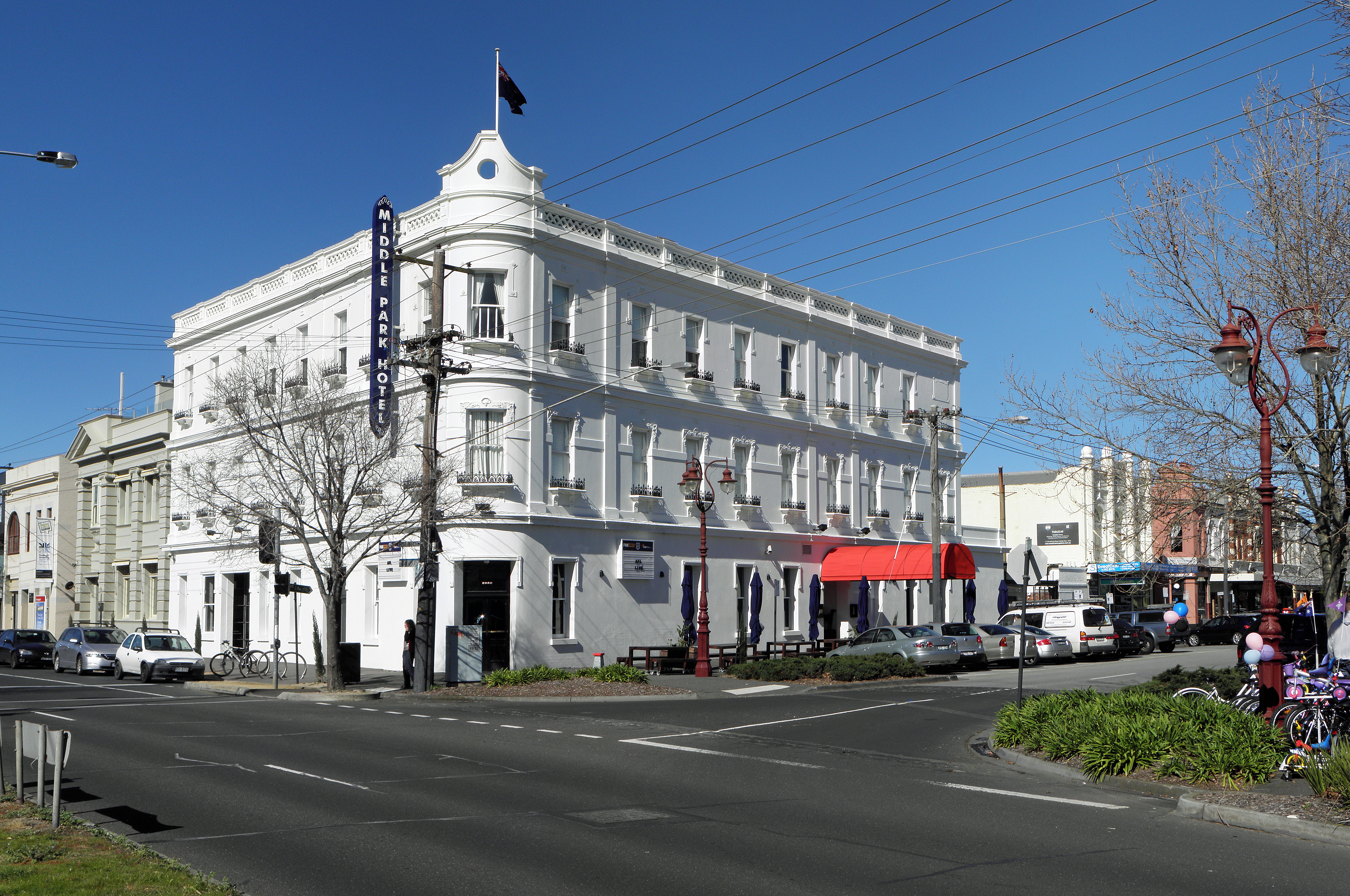
Now a hotel

In July 1914 a two-storey building opposite the Middle Park railway station was advertised for sale by auction "suitable for picture theatre or other form of public entertainment". The building, known as the Middle Park Hall, was part of the insolvent estate of one Edward Hocken Watts, and had two shops on the Armstrong Street frontage. The hall continued to be used for a variety of functions — dances, public meetings, and perhaps occasional film showings. It is almost certain this building, at No.3 Armstrong Street, is the "Middle Park picture theatre" refurbished by Sydney Blacker Turnbull (a professional engineer) and his volunteers.

== Melbourne Repertory Theatre ==
The Melbourne Repertory Club, under the direction of Sydney Turnbull and Lorna Forbes, repurposed the old picture theatre at 1–3 Armstrong Street using volunteer labour.

In March 1945 they opened the hall as a little theatre, naming it Melbourne Repertory Theatre. The freehold of the building was owned by a St Kilda woman who, as a condition of a generous lease, stipulated that it could only be used for "live drama of the spoken word". The Club's first production in their new home was Sheridan's School For Scandal, directed by the former Shakespeatean actor Lorna Forbes.

Others to use the stage included the Australian Repertory Players, whose first production there was Euripides' Alcestis, with an all-female cast directed by Maie Hoban in November 1945.

In October 1945 the Repertory Club played Ray Lawler's Hal's Belles, with Frank Thring, in a professional debut, playing a modern-day reincarnation of Henry VIII.

The Club and the Melbourne Repertory Theatre folded in December 1949, following the prolonged illness of its founder, Sydney Turnbull. His wife, Lorna Turnbull (the Lorna Forbes mentioned above was a different person) kept the movement going with considerable assistance from volunteers, but their final production was J. B. Priestley's I Have Been Here Before in December 1949.

== Arrow Theatre ==
In 1951 Frank Thring took over the lease, and had the building refurbished and redecorated by Frances Mary Burke, a well-known interior designer.

In November 1951 Thring played Herod in Irene Mitchell's production of Oscar Wilde's Salome. He would play that part again, his London debut in 1954.

His mother, Olive Thring, attended every first night until 18 February 1953, the opening of Ring Round the Moon, at which Lady Brooks was a prominent guest.

Thring closed his theatre in September 1953, citing "niggardly" support for Australian artists from Melbourne theatregoers. Critic Frank Doherty concurred. The last productions under Thring's direction were The Critic and Oedipus Rex.

Among the 18 productions that took place in 18 months, one was notable as wholly Australian — The Square Ring by Ralph W. Peterson, which production went on to the much larger Princess Theatre.

Without Thring, management of the theatre fell to the Arrow Associate Company, led by Harry Gordon and Frank Gatliff. Their first production was Sweeney Todd, the Demon Barber of Fleet Street, a fruity melodrama dating from 1842, produced by Moira Carleton and starring Carleton and Douglas Kelly, supported by Gatlff and Noel Ferrier. Their next production was titled Playbill: two pieces by Terence Rattigan: Harlequinade and The Browning Version with June Brunel in the lead. Apart from Brunel, critic Frank Doherty found little to praise in either production. No more was heard from the Arrow Associate Company. The next productions at the Arrow Theatre were N. C. Hunter's Waters of the Moon, directed by Irene Mitchell, followed by several performances by the Melbourne Little Theatre — Elizabeth Addyman's The Secret Tent, an Australian premiere.

In 1956 John Edmund and Letty Craydon leased the theatre from Thring.

It was redecorated in 1957 and became known as the "New Arrow", and home of Peter Watkins' Theaterfreunde, a Jewish theatre group founded in 1951, and of Young Theatre, founded 1955, whose membership was mostly children, and whose president was W. V. Aughterson, assistant professor of education at Melbourne University.

It was redecorated again in 1960 and saw its first play by an English-speaking Jewish company Intent to Murder by Leslie Sands.

In June 1962 Arrow Theatre reopened as a professional theatre with a topical revue, Outrageous Fortune, produced by Barbara Angell and Jon Finlayson, with Judy Jack, David Sale and Rhonda Finlayson.

The Studio Theatre Repertory Company adopted the Arrow Theatre as their home, presenting Sartre's Vicious Circle in July 1963, and Two for the Seesaw in January 1964.
