= Brett Randall =

British-Australian theatre director (1884 – 1963)

Brett Randall Snr
- Born: 15 September 1884; England
- Died: c. 1 July 1963
- Occupations: Actor, theatre producer and director
- Known for: co-Founder of Melbourne Little Theatre with Hal Percy

Brett Randall Snr (15 September 1884 – c. 1 July 1963) was a British-born Australian actor and theatre director. He was the co-founder of the Melbourne Little Theatre, which became St Martins Youth Arts Centre.

== Biography ==
Randall was born in England, the only son of Henrietta Randall (c. 1870 – 26 April 1939) who, as stage name "Henrietta Cavendish", played in the Leon Gordon Company and Herbert Randall (c. 1858 – 1 February 1942), at one time manager of Daly's Theatre, London and an old Savoyard who, using stage name "Herbert Ralland", appeared in the first production of Utopia, Limited and in several other Gilbert and Sullivan operettas. Randall helped his father manage a pantomime company and in 1907 became manager of the Holloway Empire Theatre. (Note: The Empire Theatre on the corner of Holloway Road and Manor Gardens, London, was designed by W. G. R. Sprague and built in for Oswald Stoll before becoming part of the Moss chain of theatres. Later renamed Empire Theatre of Varieties, it closed in 198 and was demolished in 1953.)

He was one of the cast members who came to Melbourne from London to appear in Ian Hay's comedy The Sport of Kings at the Athenaeum Theatre in 1926, opened at the Palace Theatre, Sydney, in August 1926, followed at the "Palace" by Eleanor Robson's In the Next Room in December 1929, Channing Pollock's The Enemy in January 1930 and Australian dramatist Isabel Handley's (Note: Isabel Handley, or I. J. Handley (born c. 1890) was a Melbourne actress and playwright. Her other plays include A Clue There Was and The Mandarin Coat. Several of her plays were performed by the London Play Society. Later plays included House to Let, The Garden Party, Wedding Belles and The Six Miss Seymours. Her Pretty Sister and The Mystery of Manfred Moon, which won Lyceum Club prizes. The only references to her between 1930 and 1938 have been as an A-list audience member.) Handcuffs for One at the Savoy Theatre in March 1930. It was around this time he first noticed deterioration of his eyesight, which worsened with advancing years.

By this time, the Great Depression was squeezing family incomes, and the "talkies" provided a cheaper form of amusement than live theatre, so many professional actors were forced to supplement their reduced incomes by other forms of employment, but kept their names before the public in repertory theatre. In 1931 Randall and Hal Percy, both "between engagements", founded a "little theatre" to present quality drama to the theatre-loving public at moderate prices. Their first venue was a kiosk at Fawkner Park, South Yarra, and slowly attracted a dedicated audience. After a few years they lost their lease and Percy left to pursue a career in radio. Led by Randall, they changed their name to the Melbourne Little Theatre Company, and took a lease on St Chad's, a small disused church in the same district, and set about converting it to a theatre for an audience of around a hundred. It was not ideal: the stage was too small (4.5 by 3.5 metres), and there was no backstage or fly area, but the talented and hard-working company prospered and for twenty years produced each year eight 3-week seasons of high-class dramatic productions. A notable new member in 1934 was Irene Mitchell, whose talent and enthusiasm were noted by Randall, who acted as a kind of mentor, encouraging her to take on increasingly responsible roles, until by 1950 she was producing most of the company's more challenging productions.

In 1948 Randall and the (Victorian) Council of Adult Education (CAE) founded "Everyman Theatres", a touring company managed by Max Bruch, which took plays to country centres.

== Personal ==
Randall was described as tall, usually wearing a beret, and possessing a gruff voice. His portrait, by L. Scott Pendlebury, was a finalist for the 1956 Archibald Prize.

Randall had two sisters, Lady Cecil Rodwell of Holbrook, Suffolk, and Betty, Mrs Ian Wilson-Johnstone. Neither is known to have visited Australia. Their parents spent their last years in Melbourne.

His son Peter Randall was associated with St Martin's Theatre, a later incarnation of St Chad's.

He is not to be confused with Brett Randall Jr, Brett Randall Snr grandson who manager of Jigsaw Theatre in the 1980s and the CEO of the Victorian Arts CentreState Theatre, Melbourne, from 1994-1996.
