= Allan Wilkie =

English actor

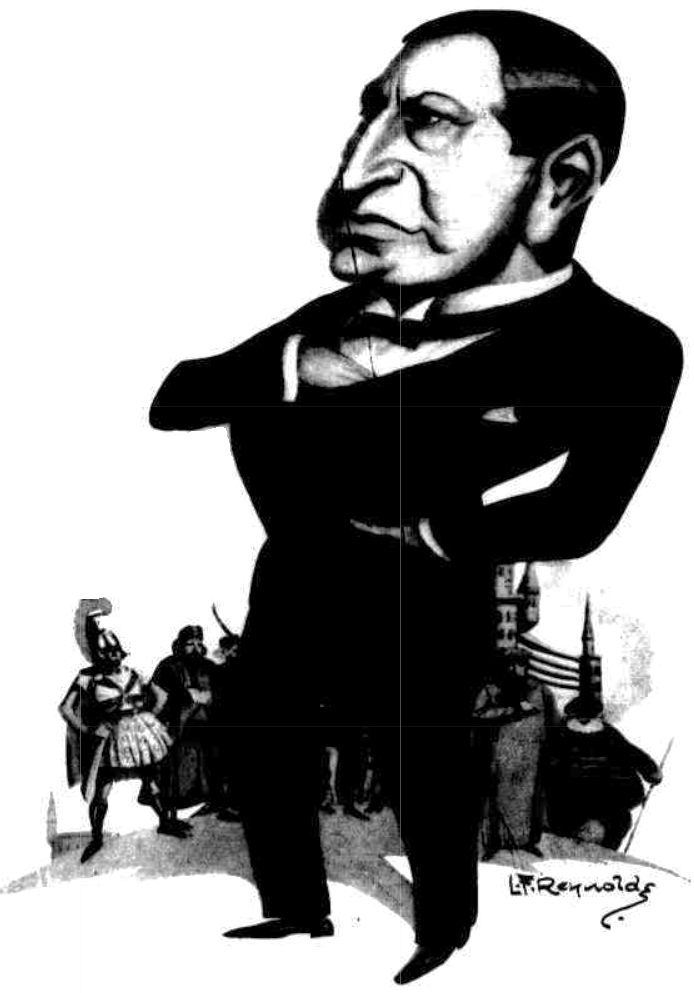
- 1926 caricature by Reynolds
- Born: 9 February 1878; Toxteth Park, Lancashire
- Died: 7 January 1970 (aged 91)
- Occupation: Actor

Allan Wilkie CBE (9 February 1878 – 7 January 1970) was an English Shakespearean actor of Scottish descent noted for his career in Australia.

== Biography ==
Born in Toxteth Park, Lancashire, he was educated at Liverpool High School and went to work in a merchant's office but became infatuated with the theatre after experiencing a performance by Osmond Tearle. He trained in the companies of Ben Greet, Frank Benson and Beerbohm Tree. On 4 February 1904 he married an actress Iné de la Garde Cameron, whom he divorced a few years later. In 1905 he founded his own company, touring with The Merchant of Venice. On 22 July 1909 he married Frediswyde Hunter-Watts (1887?–1951) who soon became his leading lady, billed as "Miss Hunter-Watts". She was the daughter of the politician Hunter Watts.

In 1911 his company played in India, followed by Ceylon, India, Singapore, British Malaya, Hong Kong, Japan in 1912 and the Philippines, returning to England in 1913, where he accepted an invitation to join a company in South Africa. He and his wife were there when World War I broke out, so decided to continue to Australia where Frediswyde had relatives. Her brother, J. Hunter-Watts, had travelled with Wilkie in the East and in 1928 travelled to Australia to manage the company's finances.

In 1915 they were playing Sweet Nell of Old Drury with the Nellie Stewart company that toured New Zealand for four months. In 1916 he joined and led George Marlow's Grand Shakespearean Company playing Shylock in The Merchant of Venice at "The Princess" in Sydney with his wife playing Portia, then As You Like It at "The Adelphi" in Melbourne playing Jaques, both to 'mixed reviews'. The young actress Lorna Forbes had joined the company in 1916 and she continued with him in 1920 when he formed the Allan Wilkie Shakespearean Company of thirty players who for eight years toured Australia giving around 14000 performances with his leading lady wife Miss (Frediswyde) Hunter-Watts. He maintained a varied program: his company knew most of the Bard's plays and no production was played on consecutive nights. For instance, they performed thirteen plays at His Majesty's Theatre, Perth from April to May 1926. A remarkable feature of their schedule was an annual Christmas season at the Theatre Royal, Hobart at a time when Tasmania was almost universally bypassed by touring companies. A serious setback occurred in June 1926, when the Geelong, Victoria Mechanics' Institute burned down with all his wardrobes and what few props and scenery they carried. Within a short time £4000 was raised from donations and benefit performances, with Orient Shipping Line contributing a free return passage to London so he could purchase new armour, wigs and wardrobes. On 22 January 1927 they were able to meet their annual commitment to Hobart!

From 1922 to 1924 he published The Shakespearean Quarterly, sold in the foyer of theatres where they performed, claimed the only such magazine published in the British Empire. Hector Bolitho was editor for a short time.

He was appointed a CBE in the 1925 Birthday Honours, at the beginning of their season at the Theatre Royal, Brisbane. The honour was in recognition of his services to the theatre and, especially, education. The publicity resulted in an extended season of two months. (Wilkie was adept at extracting benefit for his company from patronage of the wealthy and famous.) Another lucrative venue was The Majestic, Newtown, where they ran extended seasons in 1928 and 1929.

He disbanded his troupe in October 1930 at the onset of the Great Depression, (though competition from the "talkies" would have contributed, as would the increasing percentage of his audiences who paid the greatly reduced students' admission. He tried Restoration comedy (School for Scandal, The Jealous Wife) and an Australian play – Governor Bligh by Doris Egerton Jones and the first Australian production of Noël Coward's Hay Fever at the Melbourne Tivoli and through Queensland as a double bill with Bird in Hand by John Drinkwater. They travelled to New Zealand, Canada and the United States with a low-budget two-hander "scenes from Shakespeare" then retired to Scotland, or to Gillingham, Dorset, "running a chicken farm". Frediswyde died in 1951 after suffering chronic illness, and he remarried at age 87 and died at 91.

He was often criticised for his declamatory style of acting, notably by The Triad which compared him unfavourably to his contemporary Gregan McMahon, but no-one ever doubted his sincerity and energy. "He travelled further and laboured harder to bring classic theatre to Australian audiences ... Without Wilkie, Australian theatre during World War I and after would have been the poorer." (John West, op cit.)

== Legacy ==
Among Wilkie players who went on to achieve later success were Frank Clewlow, Lorna Forbes, Marie Ney, Augustus Neville, Leslie Manners, John Cairns and Ellis Irving. The renowned writer Ngaio Marsh acted with his troupe for a time, and remained a friend and correspondent. The actor/manager John Alden has been described as "a latter-day Wilkie".

The Allan Wilkie – Frediswyde Hunter-Watts Theatre Collection in the Barr Smith Library of the University of Adelaide (donated by Angel Symon) is named for them. Though much younger, Angel was a longtime friend and correspondent, and spent some years as his advance publicity agent. His third wife, Kate, donated his extensive personal archives to the same library.

Allan and Frediswyde's son Douglas was a noted newspaper journalist and commentator.

== Bibliography ==
The National Library of Australia carries an unpublished manuscript All the world my stage : a biography of the actor – manager, Allan Wilkie, C.B.E., whose exploits made him a legend in Australia for broadcast, as told to John Marlborough East with a foreword by Ngaio Marsh.
