= Margaret Geddes (writer) =

Australian writer, journalist and historian

- Born: 1949 (age 76–77); Victoria, Australia
- Occupations: Writer, journalist, historian

Margaret Geddes (born 1949) is an Australian writer, journalist and historian. She has written biographies of Australians, Remembering Weary (1996) on Edward Dunlop and Remembering Bradman (2002) on Donald Bradman; and the recollections of World War II participants in Blood, Sweat and Tears (2004).

== Biography ==
Margaret Geddes was born in 1949 in rural Victoria. Her lifelong interest in World War II was influenced by her family history; five of her mother's six younger brothers enlisted in the services during the war, and two died. Geddes worked as a journalist for The Age newspaper – initially writing rock music reviews.

In 1997 Geddes authored a work of fiction, Unseemly Longing: A Novel, which is "about a woman diagnosed with a brain tumour. [It] tells of her difficulty in adjusting to life and establishing her identity after a major operation". She has published two biographies, Remembering Weary (1996) on Edward Dunlop (1907–1993), and Remembering Bradman (2002) on Donald Bradman (1908–2001), using the recollections of people known to the subjects. Readings reviewer felt that with Remembering Bradman Geddes "builds up a remarkable and refreshingly human picture of Don Bradman and gives the first real insight into the private world of this great Australian". Geddes travelled throughout Australia, England, Scotland and Italy to interview people on their experiences during World War II for her 2004 book, Blood, Sweat and Tears. That book's illustrations were included in a folio which helped the artist, Miriam Rosenbloom, win the Hachette Livre Australia Young Designer of the Year award. ABC-TV's 2004 documentary, Bradman: Reflections on the Legend, features Geddes providing information on the man's life. In 2008 Geddes won a Creative Fellowship sponsored by State Library of Victoria which resulted in her booklet, Fighting for peace: Victorian women peace activists in WWI. In July 2010 she presented it in a multimedia format discussing "the part played by religion, politics, class and personality in women's peace and anti-conscription organisations in Victoria during WWI". In 2011 Geddes joined the Centre for Adult Education and taught courses in Editing and Non-Fiction.

== Bibliography ==
=== Non-fiction ===
- Geddes, Margaret; Victorian Arts Council; Country Education Project (Vic.); Community Arts Network Victoria (1985). Arts funding guide for community organisations in Victoria. Victorian Arts Council.
- Geddes, Margaret; League of Women Voters of Victoria (1987). A great idea : peace and women politicians of Victoria. League of Women Voters of Victoria. ISBN 978-0-7316-7666-8.
- Geddes, Margaret; Nursing Mothers' Association of Australia (1988). Mother & baby : a survival guide for the first twelve months and beyond. Viking O'Neil in association with the Nursing Mothers' Association of Australia. ISBN 978-0-670-90111-1.
- Geddes, Margaret (1990). 'As I was saying ...'. The wit & wisdom of Australian women. Five Mile Press. ISBN 978-0-86788-267-4.
- Ross, Hutchinson & Associates; Geddes, Margaret; Australian Broadcasting Corporation (1999). The sound of Melbourne : 75 years of 3LO. ABC Books for the Australian Broadcasting Corporation. ISBN 978-0-7333-0823-9.
- Margaret Geddes, ed. (2000). Australian almanac 2000. Hardie Grant Books. ISBN 978-1-86498-082-0.
  - Margaret Geddes, ed. (2001). Australian almanac 2001. Hardie Grant Books. ISBN 978-1-876719-87-6.
- Geddes, Margaret (2008). The Australian garden : a poetic and practical celebration. Illustrations by Veronica Burns. Five Mile Press. ISBN 978-1-74178-898-3.
- Geddes, Margaret (2012). Australian birds : a celebration. Illustrated by Shirley Barber. Five Mile Press. ISBN 978-1-74248-263-7.

=== Biography ===
- Geddes, Margaret (1996). Remembering Weary. Viking. ISBN 978-0-670-86705-9.
- Geddes, Margaret (2002). Remembering Bradman. Viking. ISBN 978-0-670-91231-5.
- Geddes, Margaret (2004). Blood, Sweat and Tears – Australia's WWII remembered by the men and women who lived it. Camberwell, Vic: Viking. ISBN 0-67004-089-4.

=== Fiction ===
- Geddes, Margaret (1997). Unseemly longing : a novel. Penguin. ISBN 978-0-14-025832-5.
