= An Aboriginal Moomba: Out of the Dark =

Theatrical performance

An Aboriginal Moomba: Out of the Dark was a 1951 Australian theatrical performance.

It was presented at the Princess Theatre in Melbourne by the Australian Aboriginal League, as a contribution to the centenary of Victoria and the fiftieth jubilee of the establishment of the Commonwealth of Australia. It was conceived by Douglas Nicholls and Bill Onus, and directed by Irene Mitchell.

'Part One: The Past' was a dramatic performance with movement and song of the story of Toolaba. 'Part Two: The Present' included "tableaus of progress" and performances by singers Harold Blair and Georgia Lee.

The cast of 40 players included 13 from Cherbourg.
