= Lorna Forbes =

Australian actress

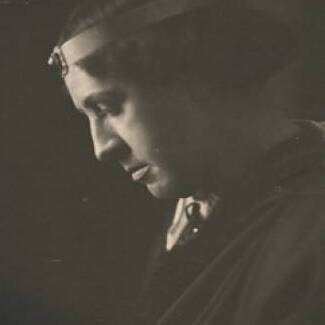
- details unknown
- Born: Ada Lorna Forbes; 1 February 1890; North Melbourne, Victoria
- Died: 26 May 1976 (aged 86); Camberwell, Victoria
- Occupation: Actress
- Spouse: Frederick Charles Chute Chapman
- Children: one

Lorna Forbes (1 February 1890 – 26 May 1976) was an Australian actress. She toured Australia with Allan Wilkie's company playing Shakespearean roles. In 1945 she co-founded the Melbourne Repertory Theatre.

== Life ==
Forbes was born in North Melbourne in 1890. Her mother was Ada Emily Windson (born Lawrence) and her father was Wilson Duff-Forbes. She was a fourth generation actress. Both of her parents were actors born in Australia, and she had a younger brother. In 1910, she married a musician named Frederick Charles Chute Chapman and they had a son.

In 1916 she joined the British actor Allan Wilkie who led George Marlow's new Grand Shakespearean Company. They first performed The Merchant of Venice in Sydney. She continued with Wilkie in 1920 when he formed the Allan Wilkie Shakespearean Company of thirty players who for eight years toured Australia giving around 14000 performances. His leading lady was his wife Miss (Frediswyde) Hunter-Watts. Forbes was able to play roles including Cleopatra, but she was generally overshadowed by the company's leading lady. Wilkie maintained a varied Shakespearean programme and no play was performed on consecutive nights.

She formed the Lorna Forbes School of Drama in Melbourne in 1924, and six years later Wilkie disbanded his troupe in October 1930 at the onset of the Great Depression and the emergence of the "talkies". She and Alexander Marsh went to Tasmania with their own troupe where they performed farces and melodramas.

In 1945 theatre enthusiast Sydney Turnbull leased the Arrow Theatre and installed over two hundred tip-up seats using volunteer labour. She and Turnbull created what was called the Melbourne Repertory Theatre. The first production was School for Scandal which Forbes directed and starred in.

In 1961 the new musical play, The Sound of Music, was staged in Melbourne, and Forbes took a minor role.

Forbes died a widow in East Camberwell in 1976. Her only son had joined the RAF, and he died in 1942.
