= Melbourne Little Theatre =

Melbourne Little Theatre was a theatre company in Melbourne, Australia, founded by Brett Randall and Hal Percy in 1931.

== History ==
Randall and Percy staged their first production, Miles Malleson's The Fanatics, at the central hall of His Majesty's Theatre in December 1931. In 1934 they purchased a disused church, "St Chad's" in Martin Street, South Yarra which, renamed "The Little Theatre", served as their home for nearly 20 years.

In 1948 Melbourne Little Theatre and the College of Adult Education (CAE) founded Everyman Theatres Pty Ltd, a professional company to bring theatre to Victorian country centres. Their first production was Benn Levy's Springtime for Henry, directed by Randall. Frank Thring and Alan Burke were members of the troupe during this period. In May 1951 Irene Mitchell directed their production of Miles Malleson's version of Molière's comedy, The Miser its first Australian production. This may have been their last production.

The company built its own theatre in South Yarra in the 1950s, and evolved into the professional St Martin's Theatre Company, before closing in 1974.

Irene Mitchell was director and producer for many of its productions.

Its theatre later became the St Martins Youth Arts Centre.
