= St Martins Youth Arts Centre =

Youth-focused performing arts centre in South Yarra in inner Melbourne

St Martins Youth Arts Centre is a youth-focused performing arts centre in South Yarra in inner Melbourne. It is a non-profit organisation that makes contemporary theatre works for adult audiences and runs weekly drama workshops for young people.

== History ==
=== Founding ===
In 1934, Brett Randall and Hal Percy founded the Melbourne Little Theatre and, in 1956, opened a theatre on the present site of St Martins. Irene Mitchell, an established actress, joined "between engagements" during the Great Depression, and there accumulated directorial skills till she became a major force in Melbourne theatre. Operation of the theatre continued until 1977, when the Victorian Government purchased the site with the intent to establish a youth arts centre. In 1978, an organisation, then known as St Martins, took up residence, and on 18 March 1980, St Martins Youth Arts Centre was established as a company and charitable institution. Finally, on 28 April 1982, The Hon. Race Mathews, MLA, Minister for the Arts opened the completed arts centre.

=== Alumni ===
St Martins alumni include:

Julian Day
Matt Day
Amanda Douge
Geire Kami
Barrie Kosky
Colin Lane
Catherine McClements
Ben Mendelsohn
Jonathan Messer
Gina Riley
Noah Taylor
Mark Trevorrow (Bob Downe)
Tripod (Scott Edgar, Simon Hall and Steven Gates)
Jane Turner
Madeleine West
Frank Woodley
Julia Zemiro
Matt Scholten

== Locations ==
=== South Yarra ===
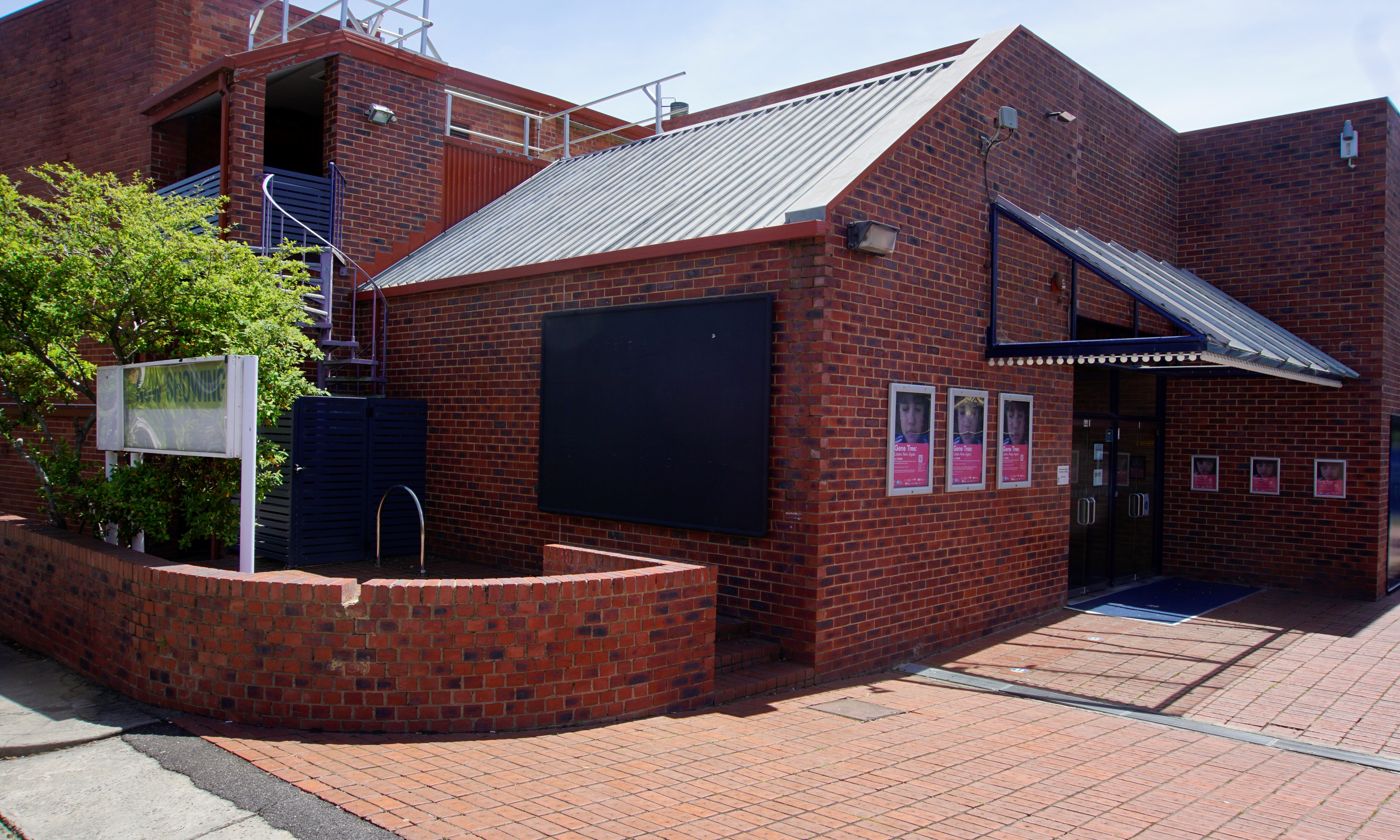
St Martins Youth Arts Centre, South Yarra

St Martins administers three buildings in South Yarra: a theatre complex and an administration building (on St Martins Lane) and a converted church (on Millswyn St).

==== Theatres ====
St Martins theatre complex contains two theatres: the Randall Theatre and the Irene Mitchell Studio. The Randall Theatre is a traditional rectangular theatre, with rows of fixed ascending seats and a standard lighting fixture. The Studio, by contrast, is a "black box" space, with no permanent stage or seating, though materials are kept that can be assembled into a seating area. The complex also has a box office and dressing rooms.

==== Administration Building ====
The Administration building's only rented space is the rehearsal room.

==== Church Hall ====
The Church Hall is a rehearsal room particularly suited to dance.

=== Northcote ===
St Martins regularly uses a room in Northcote Town Hall for its Northcote workshops.

== Workshops ==
St Martins holds drama workshops for young people at its South Yarra and Northcote locations.

Workshop age groups are 5-8s, 9-12s, Teens and cross-age. St Martins has a strong focus on access and inclusion.

== Recent Projects and Productions ==
St Martins presents works created with children for adult audiences under a model of 'Large Interactions' and 'Small interruptions'. Large Interactions are mainstage works, presented at major festivals and venues and Small Interruptions are small-scale site specific works often involving one to one audience interaction with children.

=== Small Interruptions ===
==== Fitter. Faster. Better. ====
Paired one-on-one with a ‘personal trainer’ between 6 and 10 years old, Fitter. Faster. Better. is a boot camp for adults run by children. It was initially presented as part of Dance Massive festival in 2015. It has been subsequently presented at Junction Arts Festival in Launceston and the Commonwealth Games on the 2018 Gold Coast.

==== Soundtracks ====
Soundtracks is audio commentary of artistic works by children. It can be presented with live or installed works. It has been shown as an accompaniment to the Australian Ballet's La Sylphide, as an audio tour alongside Crossing Paths with Vivian Maier for the 2014 Melbourne Festival; and as live accompaniment to Christophe Bertrand's Quator No. 1 for Bendigo International Festival of Exploratory Music.

==== 16 Girls ====
16 Girls is a promenade work that presents the image of a large group of pregnant teenagers engaging in regular everyday activities. It was initially performed in 2015 at Castlemaine State Festival. The work takes inspiration from a real event in 2008, a group of teenagers at Gloucester High School, Massachusetts made a pact to become pregnant and raise the children collectively.

=== Large Interactions ===
==== I Saw the Second One Hit ====
I saw the second one hit is a theatre work developed in collaboration with twin girls born on September 11, 2011. It explores the world that these twins, now teenagers, inhabit through their beliefs, their fears, their politics. It was first presented at the Malthouse Theatre in 2015.

==== The Bacchae ====
The Bacchae is a theatre work directed by Adena Jacobs, made collaboratively with the female ensemble cast of teenagers.

==== Gonzo ====
Gonzo is a theatre work directed by Clare Watson, about teenage boys and porn – specifically, how often they watch it, who they watch it with, and why. Gonzo was performed at Malthouse Theatre in 2016.

==== Genius ====
Genius is a theatre work that creates "an intimate hour with six young performers from a neurological minority, encountered on their own terms.".

==== For The Ones Who Walk Away ====
For The Ones Who Walk Away was called a "piece of collaborative brilliance". The work invites audiences to roam its many rooms in search of the traces of the ones who walked away.

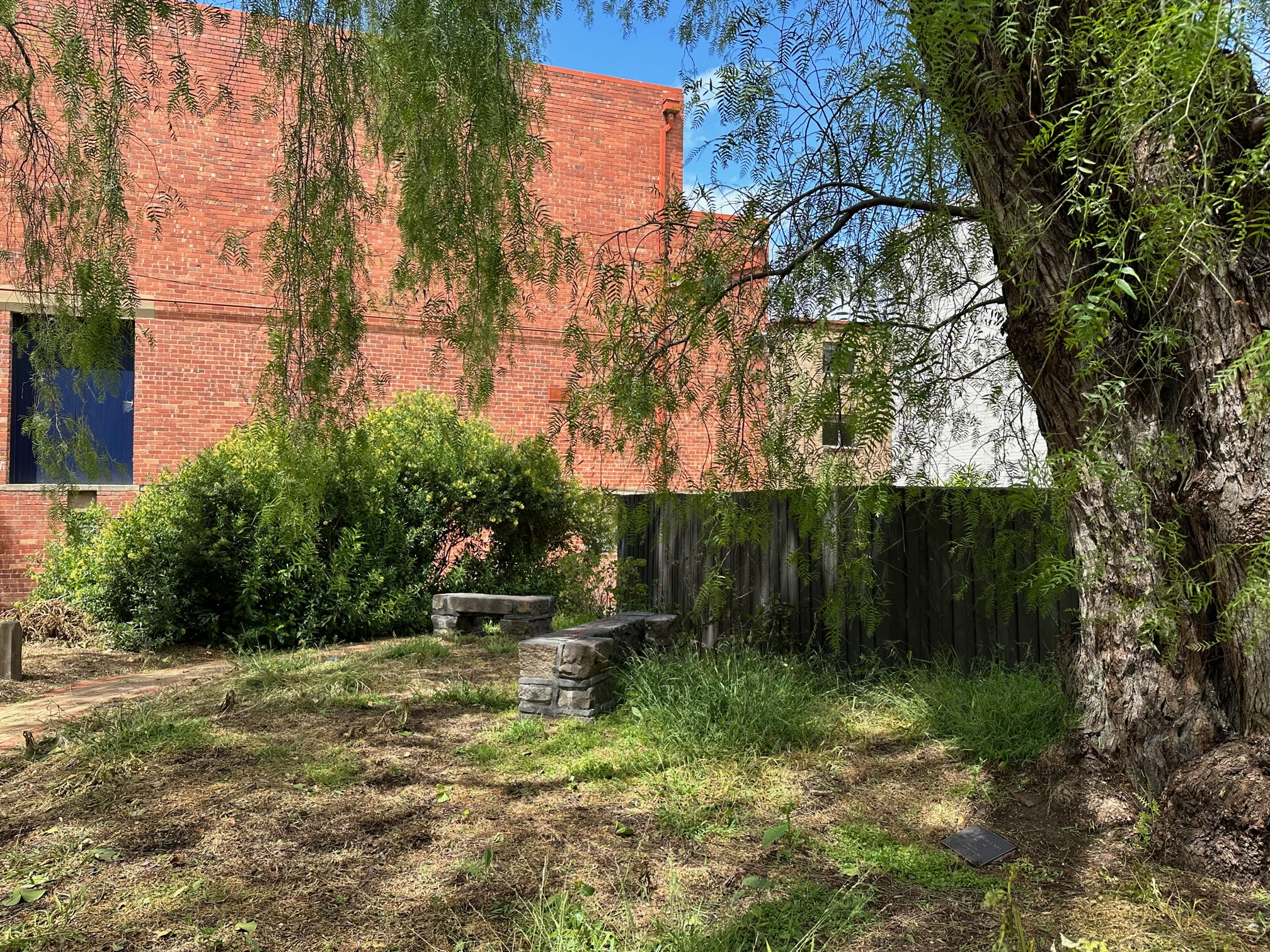
The pepper tree behind St Martins Theatre

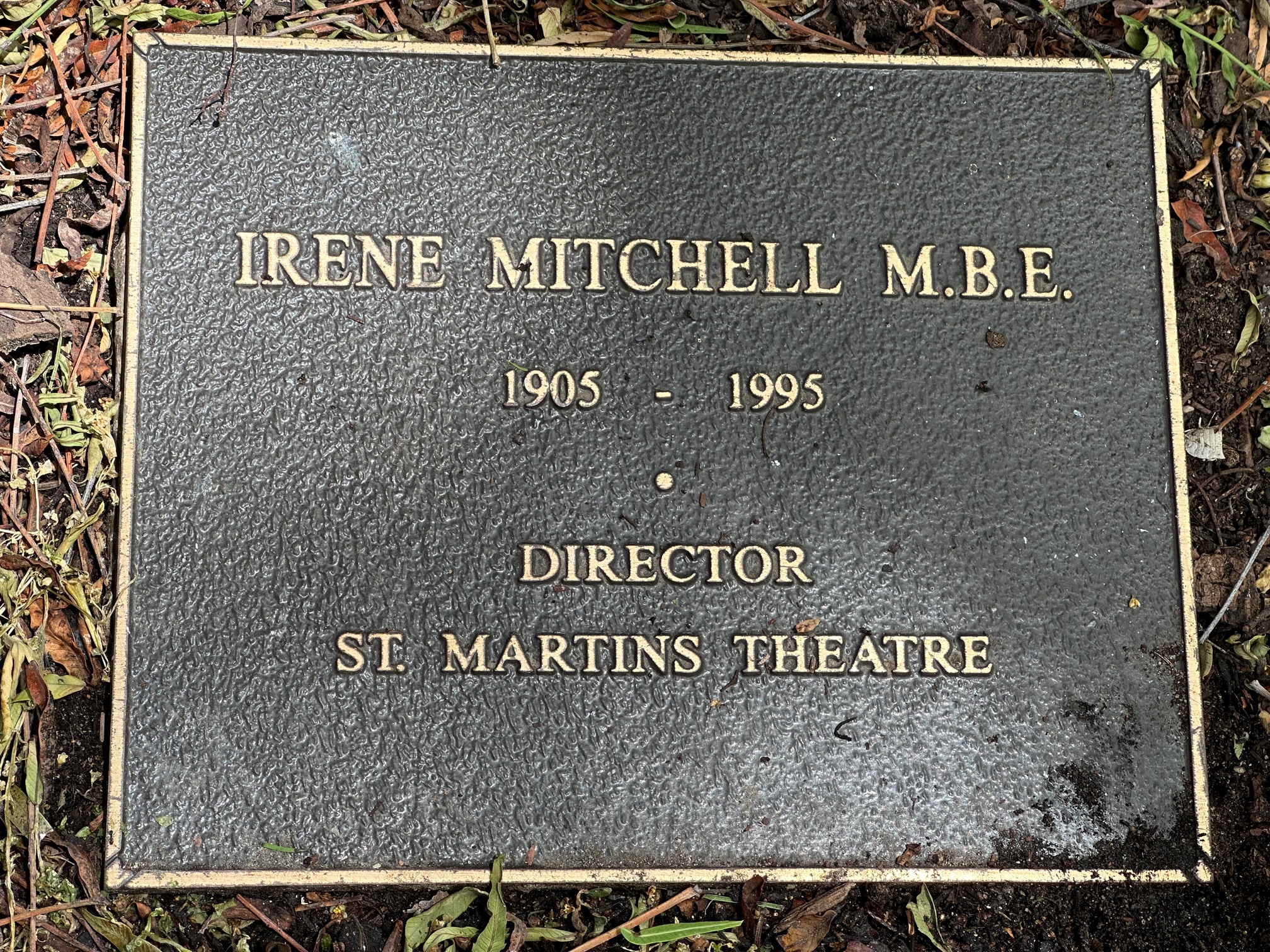
Memorial to Irene Mitchell

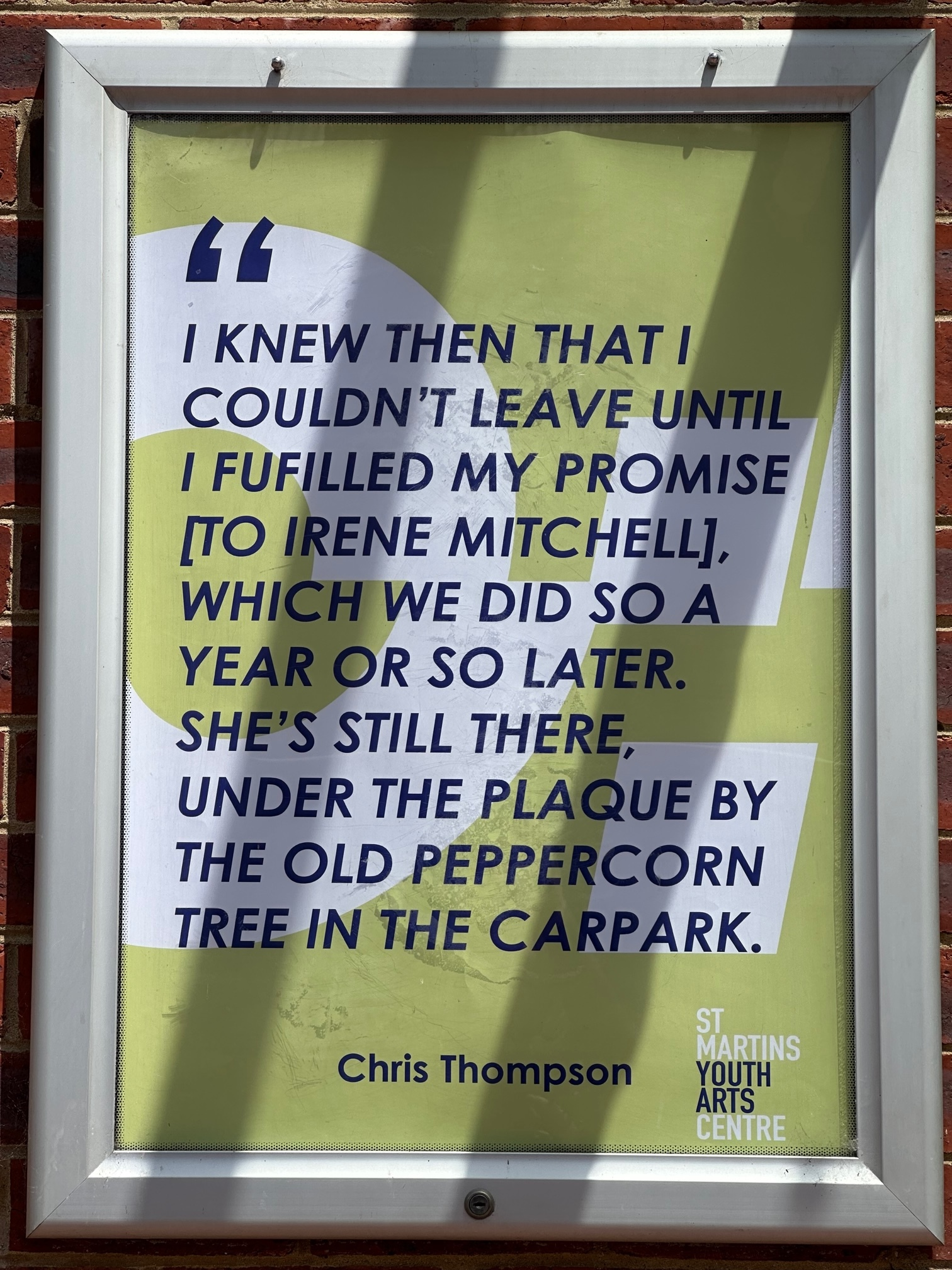
Chris Thompson's memorial to Mitchell
