= Russell J. Oakes =

Australian writer of short stories and plays

Russell John Oakes (c. 1909 – 15 June 1952) was an Australian writer of short stories and plays, perhaps best remembered for his play Enduring as the Camphor Tree, described by one critic as "Australia's first great play".

== History ==
Oakes was born in Paddington, New South Wales, a son of William John Oakes and Maude Matilda Oakes (née Stokes), later of Pagewood, New South Wales.

Like many Sydney children in the 1920s, he contributed to "The Enchanted Castle" and "Treasure Tower" pages for children in The Telegraph and became a member of their Junior Literary Society. He was also a member of the Sydney Sun's "Sunbeamers" and later their Free-Lance Club, which had clubrooms at Burdekin House, where they held a reading of his play As Between Gentlemen on 18 August 1931.

He joined the Regular Army, and was stationed with the Field Ambulance in Western Australia, where he joined the Society of Playwrights (WA) and was its chairman in 1939. After the outbreak of WWII he was reassigned as an army instructor in Sydney, then was sent to Papua New Guinea on active service.

== Works ==
His works include:

- The Voice of Jerome Keddle (1930 play)
- Wool Gathering Russell (1935 play)
- Water Goes East (three-act play) copyright registration 1939
- Enduring as the Camphor Tree (1946 play) copyright registration December 1950
- Judgment (1950 one-act play) copyright registration 1950
- No One Spoke (1945 wartime short story, in several collections)
- The Body in Room 13 (1930 short story)
- Two radio plays starring Rod Taylor:

- Conscious Effort (1951), set in Papua, for Actor's Choice broadcast
- The Hands of Mary Clifford (4 April 1952) for ABC

== Family ==
Oakes married (Helena) Joy Truelove of Kingsford, New South Wales on 28 June 1941. Their home in 1952 was at 36 Leonard Avenue Kingsford. They had two sons, Geoffrey and Owen, one of whom was born on 17 September 1944.
