= French for Love =

- Genre: Language instruction
- Created by: Gerard Arthur; Sheila Arthur
- Presented by: Gerard Arthur; Sheila Arthur; Felixe Fitzgerald; Paul Hebert
- Country of origin: Canada
- Original language: English
- No. of seasons: 2

Production
- Producer: Denyse Adam
- Production location: Montreal

Original release
- Network: CBC Television
- Release: 3 January 1965 – 10 July 1966

French for Love is a Canadian French-language instructional television series that aired on CBC Television from 1965 to 1966.

== Premise ==
This Montreal-produced series taught English audiences how to speak in French. Initial hosts Gerard and Sheila Arthur, a married couple who also created the series, were previously featured on CBC Radio's Time For French series. The Arthurs performed sketches to demonstrate French conversation in a manner that could be explained to an English audience. Other features of the episodes included "What The Dictionaries Don't Tell" which described French nuances and idioms, plus "Pages choisies" where Gerard Arthur read a French passage then translated this to English.

New hosts, Felixe Fitzgerald and Paul Hebert, appeared from 28 February 1965 when Gerard Arthur left the series and Sheila Arthur focused on scriptwriting. The Arthurs reappeared in the 1966 season but left the performance of the instructional sketches to actors such as Raymond Cosgrove, Yvon Dufour, Lise Lasalle and Carol Zorro.

== Scheduling ==
The half-hour series was broadcast regionally on CBMT from 1962. Its first nationally broadcast episodes were aired Sundays at 2:00 p.m. from 3 January to 30 May 1965. The Time For French CBC Radio series was renamed to French For Love later that year. Episodes of the second network-wide season were broadcast Sundays at 3:30 p.m. from 3 April to 10 July 1966.
