= Harold Blair =

Australian politician

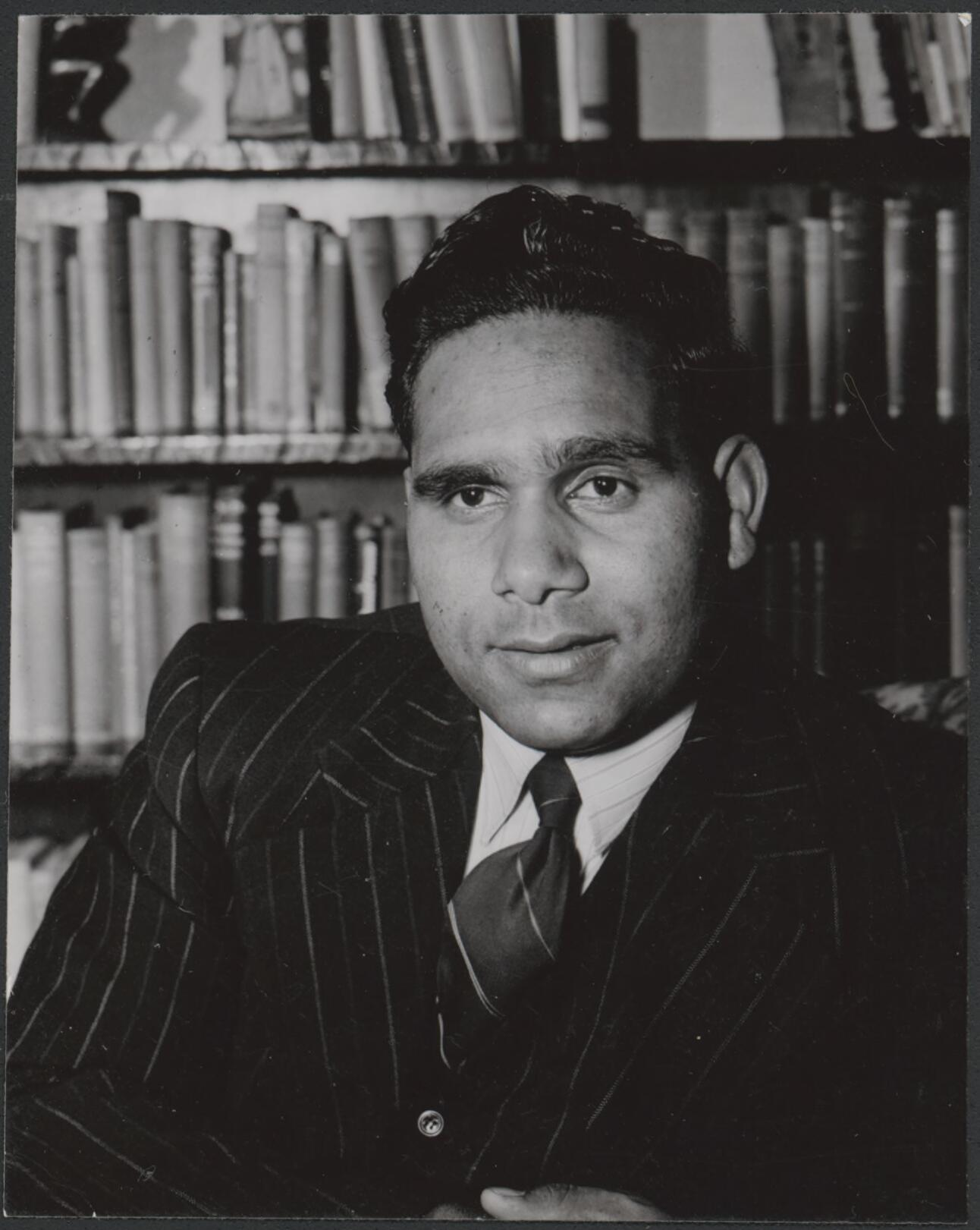
- Blair in 1958
- Born: September 13, 1924; Cherbourg, Queensland
- Died: May 21, 1976 (aged 51)
- Occupation: Tenor (singer)

Harold Blair AM (13 September 1924 – 21 May 1976) was a Wulli Wulli man, an Australian tenor and Aboriginal activist. He has been called the "last great Australian tenor of the concert hall era".

== Early life ==
Blair was born at the Barambah Aboriginal Reserve at Cherbourg, 5 kilometres (3 mi) from Murgon in Queensland, on 13 September 1924. His mother was Esther Quinn, a teenage Aboriginal woman. His surname, Blair, came from the family that had "adopted" his mother. He and his mother then went to the Salvation Army Purga Mission near Ipswich. His mother was sent into domestic service, leaving Harold, then aged two, at the mission, where he received an elementary education. Blair left school at age 16, gaining employment as a farm labourer.

At the age of 17, he was working as a tractor driver at the Fairymead Sugar Mill. Communist trade union organiser Harry Green of Ipswich heard him singing and encouraged him to make it his career. In 1944 he joined professional artists raising money for charitable and patriotic causes. In March 1945 he entered a radio talent quest in Brisbane and attracted a record number of listeners' votes. The Queensland state government offered sponsorship for his further musical training, but was not taken up. Soprano Marjorie Lawrence heard him sing and praised his potential for representing Aboriginal culture to the public. And an unnamed medical practitioner was a major sponsor. A group of trade unionists, academics and musicians, including the composer Margaret Sutherland, formed a trust to sponsor his career.

The fund was managed by a Brisbane committee, under secretary Harry Green, president Professor J. V. Duhig, and whose members included Martin Healy (secretary of the Queensland T. and L. Council) and Dr Dalley-Scarlett. He boarded at John and Gwen Lloyd's (Gwenoldyn Kent Hughes) house in Melbourne while he attended the Melba Conservatorium.

== Singing career ==
Blair in 1958

He entered the Melba Conservatorium in Melbourne in 1945 and earned a Diploma of Music with honours in 1949. In 1950, Blair was invited to study in the United States by the noted African-American singer Todd Duncan. Blair studied at the Juilliard School, New York. While in New York he sang in a church in Harlem.

In 1951, the Australian Broadcasting Commission offered Blair a three-year singing contract, commencing with an extensive tour to celebrate 50 years of Federation. At least one critic disapproved of the ABC's lionizing an unproven performer, but Henri Penn, his accompanist throughout the tour, was generally praised. His repertoire consisted largely of European classical pieces in their original tongue — German lieder, Italian opera, and French art songs, as well as works in English by Handel and Southern spirituals. He also introduced traditional Aboriginal songs — "Nananala Kututja" ("O God, Stay With Us Always", arranged by Rev R. M. Trudinger), "Maranoa Lullaby" and "Jabbin Jabbin" (arranged by Dr. H. O. Lethbridge, of Narrandera and Arthur S. Loam of Wagga), and other traditional songs, but admitted he most enjoyed singing "Aba Daba Honeymoon" with his wife Dorothy.

He cancelled his 41st concert in the series, at City Hall, Brisbane, due to a heavy cold but, though suffering laryngitis, gave a good concert at Maryborough three weeks later. He then returned to Brisbane, but was not in good voice. and gave up public appearances, at least temporarily, to concentrate on studying.

Having broken the contract, he was prohibited from singing professionally for three years. Discouraged, Blair sought other work including working for a hardware store. He expressed an interest in education and was taken on as a teacher at Ringwood Technical School. He later became a teacher at the Conservatorium in Melbourne, and served on the Aboriginal Arts Board.

Coincident with the ABC's 1951 tour was the variety spectacular Out of the Dark – An Aboriginal Moomba, produced by leaders of the Australian Aborigines' League Doug Nicholls and Bill Onus and programmed as part of Melbourne's jubilee festival, with Blair and Georgia Lee as feature artists. This show, directed by Irene Mitchell, toured much of country Victoria to good reviews.

== Aboriginal activism ==
Blair continued to act for Aboriginal rights all his life. He joined the Aborigines Advancement League in its early days and later the Federal Council for the Advancement of Aborigines and Torres Strait Islanders. Watching an Aboriginal marching girls group at Moomba in 1962 led Blair to establish the Aboriginal Children's Holiday Project, and he was an early member of the Aborigines Welfare Board in Victoria. In 1963 he stood as a candidate for the Australian Labor Party for the seat of Mentone in the Victorian Parliament against Edward Meagher, the then Transport Minister and chairman of the Aboriginal Welfare Board.

== Personal life ==
Blair married a fellow conservatorium singing student, Dorothy Eden, on 30 July 1949, and had two children, Nerida and Warren. The marriage encountered some hostility at the time, as it involved the marriage of an Aboriginal man to a European woman. He is survived by three grandchildren.

He had twin half-sisters, Joy and June Thompson (born around 1936), with whom he remained in contact.

Blair's favourite sport was Australian rules football.

== Honours and recognition ==
Blair was appointed a Member of the Order of Australia (AM) in the Australia Day Honours of 1976.

Blair was honoured on This Is Your life, aired Apr 29, 1976.

The Australian Electoral Division of Blair in Queensland, created in 1998, is named after him.

In 2012, the Melba Opera Trust established the Harold Blair Opera Scholarship, to provide young Indigenous singers with artistic development, mentoring and performance opportunities. The scholarship was won by Tiriki Onus in 2012 and 2013.

In 2013, Blair was inducted into the Victorian Aboriginal Honour Roll.

He died in Melbourne's Mercy Hospital on 21 May 1976, aged 51. An obituary opined that his most enduring legacy would be his Aboriginal children's holiday project, which saw thousands of children boarding in private homes in Melbourne and Sydney during school holidays.

Harold Blair is buried at The Purga Aboriginal Cemetery, with his grave located directly beneath the "Purga Aboriginal Cemetery Reserve" sign.

== Bibliography ==
- Dark Man, White World: A Portrait of Tenor Harold Blair ISBN 0-909091-08-0 (1975) biography by Kenneth Harrison (Novalit Australia Pty Ltd, Cheltenham, Melbourne)
