= 1988 Australian Film Institute Awards =

Australian film and television award ceremony

30th Australian Film Institute Awards
- Date: 10 October 1988

Highlights
- Best Film: The Navigator

The 30th Australian Film Institute Awards were awards held by the Australian Film Institute to celebrate the best of Australian films and television of 1988. Twenty six films were entered for the feature film categories.

The 1988 AFI Awards attracted controversy, including for the lack of television broadcast and an Australian Writers' Guild boycott which resulted in the AFI withdrawing the screenplay categories.

Cinematographer Russell Boyd received the Raymond Longford Award for lifetime achievement and director George Ogilvie the Byron Kennedy Award.

== Feature film ==
Best Film: The Navigator — John Maynard; Boulevard of Broken Dreams — Frank Howson; Grievous Bodily Harm — Richard Brennan; Mullaway — D. Howard Grigsby	Best Direction: Vincent Ward — The Navigator; Pino Amenta — Boulevard of Broken Dreams; Craig Lahiff — Fever; Don McLennan — Mullaway
Best Lead Actor: John Waters — Boulevard of Broken Dreams; Sean Scully — Phobia; Mark Lee — The Everlasting Secret Family; Hamish McFarlane — The Navigator	Best Lead Actress: Nadine Garner — Mullaway; Rosey Jones — Afraid to Dance; Wendy Hughes — Boundaries of the Heart; Jo Kennedy — Tender Hooks
Best Supporting Actor: Kim Gyngell — Boulevard of Broken Dreams; Bruno Lawrence — Grievous Bodily Harm; John Meillon — The Everlasting Secret Family; Paul Livingston — The Navigator	Best Supporting Actress: Tina Bursill — Jilted; Julie Nihill — Boundaries of the Heart; Mary Coustas — Mullaway; Sue Jones — Mullaway
Best Cinematography: The Navigator — Geoffrey Simpson; Boulevard of Broken Dreams — David Connell; Grievous Bodily Harm — Ellery Ryan; The Lighthorsemen — Dean Semler	Best Editing: The Navigator — John Scott; Boulevard of Broken Dreams — Philip Reid; Grievous Bodily Harm — Marc van Buuren; The Dreaming — Suresh Ayyar
Best Original Music Score: The Lighthorsemen — Mario Millo; Fever — Frank Strangio; Incident at Raven's Gate — Graham Tardif, Roman Kronen; Where the Outback Ends — Andrew Hagen, Morton Wilson	Best Sound: The Lighthorsemen — Lloyd Carrick, Craig Carter, Peter Burgess, James Currie, Phil Heywood, Peter D. Wood; Dangerous Game — Peter Fenton, Phil Heywood, Martin Oswin; Rikky and Pete — Roger Savage, Lloyd Carrick, Frank Lipson, Craig Carter, Chris Goldsmith, Ross Chambers; The Man From Snowy River II — Terry Rodman, David Harrison, Ron Purvis, Tim Chau, Peter Burgess, Gary Wilkins
Best Production Design: The Navigator — Sally Campbell; Dangerous Game — Igor Nay; Incident at Raven's Gate — Judith Russell; Spirits of the Air, Gremlins of the Clouds — Sean Peter Miller	Best Costume Design: The Navigator — Glenys Jackson; Boulevard of Broken Dreams — Cheryl McCloud; Mullaway — Jeanie Cameron; Spirits of the Air, Gremlins of the Clouds — Angela Tonks, Mathu Anderson

== Television ==
Best Telefeature: A Matter of Convenience (ABC) — Noel Price; Fragments of War (Network Ten) — Terry Hayes, Doug Mitchell, George Miller; Olive (ABC) — Richard Brennan; Sisterly Love (ABC) — Peter Du Cane	Best Mini Series: The True Believers (ABC) — Sandra Levy, Matt Carroll; The Alien Years (ABC) — Ray Alchin; Captain James Cook (ABC) — Ray Alchin; Poor Man's Orange (Network Ten) — Anthony Buckley
Best Achievement in Direction in a Telefeature: Ben Lewin — A Matter of Convenience (ABC); Ken Cameron — The Clean Machine (Network Ten); George Ogilvie — Princess Kate (ABC); Stephen Wallace — Olive (ABC)	Best Achievement in Direction in a Mini Series: Peter Fisk — The True Believers (ABC); Donald Crombie — The Alien Years (ABC); Lawrence Gordon Clark — Captain James Cook (ABC); George Whaley — Poor Man's Orange (Network Ten)
Best Performance by an Actor in a Telefeature: Ernie Dingo — A Waltz Through the Hills (Nine Network); Nicholas Eadie — Fragments of War (Network Ten); John Hargreaves — The Lizard King (ABC); Nick Tate — Olive (ABC)	Best Performance by an Actress in a Telefeature: Kerry McGuire — Olive (ABC); Maggie King — Sisterly Love (ABC); Judith Stratford — Custody; Joan Sydney — Sisterly Love (ABC)
Best Performance by an Actor in a Mini Series: Ed Devereaux — The True Believers (ABC); Simon Chilvers — The True Believers (ABC); Shane Connor — Poor Man's Orange (Network Ten); Keith Michell — Captain James Cook (ABC)	Best Performance by an Actress in a Mini Series: Anne Phelan — Poor Man's Orange (Network Ten); Tushka Bergen — Always Afternoon (ABC); Kaarin Fairfax — Poor Man's Orange (Network Ten); Victoria Longley — The Alien Years (ABC)

== Non-feature film ==
Best Documentary: Cane Toads, An Unnatural History — Mark Lewis, Film Australia; Riding the Gale — Kim Batterham, Genni Batterham; South of the Border — David Bradbury; Thanks Girls and Goodby — Sue Maslin, Sue Hardisty	Best Short Fiction Film: Cherith — Shirley Barrett, Alexander Sharp (AFTRS); Boss Boy — George Viscas (Swinburne); Rabbit on the Moon — Monica Pellizzari (AFTRS); The Seannachie — Lynn Hegarty (Swinburne)
Best Short Animation: Where the Forest Meets the Sea — Jeannie Baker (Film Australia); A Craven — Anne Algar (Swinburne); Feathers And Fools — Penny Robenstone (Film Victoria); Home Sweet Home — Simone Lindhout (Swinburne)	Best Experimental Film: A Song of Air — Jane Karslake, Merilee Bennett; Bad Rocks — David Stranger; Delirium — Kathy Smith; Phantasmagoria — Colin Hawke
Best Direction in a Non-Feature Film: Monica Pellizzari — Rabbit On The Moon; Danae Gunn, Jayne Stevenson — The Invisible Girl; John Hughes — All That is Solid; Hugh Piper — Riding the Gale	Best Cinematography in a Non-Feature Film: Philip Bull — South of the Border; Jim Frazier, Wayne Taylor — Cane Toads, An Unnatural History; John Maruff — Green; Lief Peedersen — Smoke 'Em If You Got 'Em
Best Editing in a Non-Feature Film: Lindsay Frazer — Cane Toads, An Unnatural History; Merilee Bennett — A Song of Air; Scott Patterson, Neill Gibbie — Sleepwalker; Denise Hunter — South of the Border	Best Sound in a Non-Feature Film: John Patterson, Annie Cocksedge, David Bradbury — South Of The Border; Rodney Simmons, George Hart — COO-EE; Liam Egan, Michelle Cattle, Geoffrey Stitt — Crane; Philip Brophy, Ian Haig, Pillip Samartzis — Salt, Saliva, Sperm and Sweat
