= Nicki Paull =

Australian actress

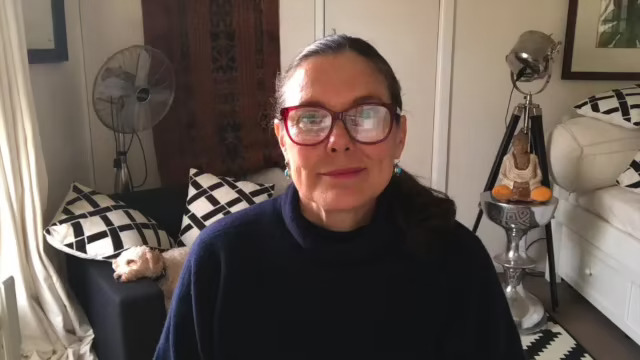
- Born: Nicola Paull; Queensland, Australia
- Education: Victorian College of the Arts Diploma in Arts (Drama), Swinburne University Master of Business (Human Resource Management)
- Occupations: Actress, voice-over, counsellor
- Years active: 1983–present
- Spouse: Keith Potger (m. 2006; div. 2014)
- Website: www.nickipaull.com

Nicola Paull (born 1962 in Queensland, Australia), is an Australian actress and a registered counsellor. Though predominantly known for her work on television, she has also appeared in films and on stage, as well as performing as a voice-over artist and narrator.

== Career ==
=== Education and Film ===
Paull graduated with a Diploma in Arts (Drama) from the Victorian College of the Arts in 1983, aged 21. In 1988, she had a role in the Australian film Boulevard of Broken Dreams while in 2002, she had a small role in the horror film Queen of the Damned.

In mid-life, Paull earned a Master of Business (Human Resource Management) degree from Swinburne University in Melbourne. Separately, she holds a Diploma of Counselling. Paull has appeared in guest roles on Australian television and film, and on the stage. For several years, she ran a series of workshops entitled "The Business of Being an Artist" based on her Master's thesis.

In 2008, Paull narrated the audiobook "The Independence of Miss Mary Bennet" by Colleen McCullough.

In August 2021, Paull enrolled in the Certificate IV in New Small Business at Holmesglen Institute of TAFE as part of the government funded NEIS program. This program provides individuals on government benefits access to further government assistance to start their own businesses. Paull applied to the program to develop her counselling services business.

=== Television ===
Paull made her acting debut in 1984, when she appeared as Doris Cruickshank in the Network Ten drama serial, Prisoner, before rising to prominence with her roles as Sarah Harper in Return to Eden (1986), and as Lisa Mullins, when she returned to Prisoner for its final season (1986). Initially intended to be a regular role on the show, Paull only appeared in six episodes, when she caught pneumonia, and was permanently replaced with Terrie Waddell for the remainder of the show's run. Other appearances include Miss Scarlett in Cluedo (1992), and in the mini-series Darlings of the Gods (1989), Paull played the role of June Kelly. She has also had roles in The Flying Doctors and Neighbours.

In the 1990s, Paull moved to the UK and began working as a producer of corporate events and audio programmes for several years before returning to Australia.

== Filmography ==
=== Film ===
Year	Title	Role	Type
1985	Jenny Kissed Me	Policewoman Moore	Feature film
1985	Niel Lynne	Melissa	Feature film
1988	Boulevard of Broken Dreams	Suzy Daniels	Feature film
1988	Raw Silk	Kate Bradshaw	TV movie/TV pilot
1989	What the Moon Saw	Night	Feature film
1993	Flynn (aka "My Forgotten Man")	Marelle Flynn	Feature film
1994	Ebbtide	Katherine McGuire	Feature film
1994	Halifax f.p.	Tracey Cunningham	TV film series, 1 episode: "The Feeding"
2002	Queen of the Damned	Flight Attendant	Feature film
2006	Fatal Contact: Bird Flu in America	HHS Sec's Aide	TV movie
2009	Remembering Nigel	Nicki Paull	Feature film

=== Television ===
Year	Title	Role	Type
1984; 1986	Prisoner	Doris Cruickshank	TV series, 3 episodes
1985	A Thousand Skies	Marge McGrath	TV miniseries, 1 episode
1986	Return to Eden	Sarah Harper	TV series, 22 episodes
1986	Prisoner	Lisa Mullins	TV series, 6 episodes
1989	The Flying Doctors	Alex Thompson	TV series, 1 episode
1989	Darlings of the Gods	June Kelly	TV miniseries, 2 episodes
1989	Acropolis Now!	Sarah Burns	TV series, 1 episode
1989	G.P.	Stephanie Jamieson	TV series, 1 episode
1990	Skirts	Guest role	TV series, 1 episode
1992	Bingles	Guest role	TV series, 1 episode
1992	Bony	Jane	TV series, 1 episode
1992-93	Cluedo	Miss Scarlett	TV series, 21 episodes
1993	Time Trax	Brenda	TV series, 1 episode
1995	Ocean Girl	Researcher #2	TV series, 3 episodes
1996	Mercury	Guest role	TV series, 1 episode
1998	Mouthing Off	Guest	TV series, 1 episode
1999	Neighbours	Natalie Rigby	TV series, 7 episodes
2000; 2004	Blue Heelers	Maureen Flannery	TV series, 1 episode
2002	The Secret Life of Us	Ms Anderson	TV series, 1 episode
2002	MDA	Dr. Karen Hill	TV series, 1 episode
2003	CrashBurn	Divorcee	TV series, 1 episode
2004	Blue Heelers	Margaret Nelson	TV series, 1 episode
2008	The Magic of Audrey	Narrator	TV special
2011	Small Time Gangster	Janet	TV miniseries, 3 episodes
2011	Twentysomething	Celebrant	TV series, 1 episode
2011-13	Winners & Losers	Leanne O'Connor	TV series, 4 episodes
2013	Paper Giants: Magazine Wars	Maggie Tabberer	TV miniseries, 1 episode
2022	Talking Prisoner	Herself	Podcast series, 1 episode

=== Publications ===
Paull has published under the pen name Margot MacCallum with trauma-informed expertise in the niche field of recovery from narcissistic abuse.

- 2018 MacCallum, Margot : Healing the Trauma of Psychological Abuse - A Lived Experience Roadmap to a Mindful Recovery (Balboa Press, AU) ISBN 9781504315326 | Subject: Family & Relationships › Divorce & Separation (Self-help)

== Personal life ==
On 18 November 2006, Paull married Australian musician Keith Potger in front of six witnesses and a celebrant on the Mornington Peninsula. They divorced on 8 February 2014. Paull is a registered counsellor based in Melbourne, specialising in Acceptance and Commitment Therapy (ACT) and Buddhist Psychology.
