= Adrian Wright =

English-Australian actor

- Born: 1 July 1947; Maidenhead, England
- Died: 28 November 2015 (aged 68)
- Spouse: Abigail

Adrian Wright (1 July 1947 – 28 November 2015) was an English-Australian actor known for his roles in the 1970s children's television series Freewheelers and the Australian serial Prisoner in which he played nurse Neil Murray.

== Early life ==
Wright was born in Maidenhead, England, to Matvyn and Kay Wright. He was one of four brothers, including Martyn, Gareth and Gavyn. His father Matvyn was an artist and animator, best known for illustrating the British Andy Pandy children's books. His brother Gavyn is a violinist and orchestra leader who has worked with artists including Elton John, Tina Turner and Simply Red.

== Career ==
Wright first appeared as an actor in repertory theatres in England and Wales. He subsequently moved to Australia where he continued his career.

He appeared as Mike Hobbs in the British children's television series Freewheelers from 1970 to 1972, and was known for his role in the Australian prison drama series Prisoner from 1979 to 1982, in which he played male nurse Neil Murray, after having previously played a minor guest role as a policeman; Detective Graham Lang in episodes 10-12. He also played the recurring role of Phillip Garrick in Carson's Law in 1984. Later in his career, he played Lieutenant Jean Morlais in all 22 episodes of Tales of the South Seas from 1998 to 2000.

He also had guest roles in many prominent television series throughout the 1970s and 1980s, including Division 4, Homicide, Bluey, Chopper Squad, Skyways, Bellamy, Cop Shop, Five Mile Creek and Mission: Impossible. In the 1990s he guested in Janus, Halifax f.p. and Snowy River: The McGregor Saga. He also appeared in several miniseries including Tandarra (1976), Against the Wind (1978), Water Under the Bridge and The Last Outlaw (both 1980), 1915 (1982) and All the Rivers Run (1983).

Wright's most notable film credits include thriller End Play (1975), mystery Summerfield (1977) both of which he appeared in alongside John Waters, World War I film The Lighthorsemen (1987), thriller Gross Misconduct (1993) alongside Naomi Watts and sci-fi comedy horror Body Melt (also 1993).

Wright performed in the theatre with productions for Russell Street Theatre, St Martins Theatre and La Mama, including Travesties, Of Mice and Men, Othello and The Two Tigers, the latter directed by Robert Chuter. He also performed in ABC Radio plays.

== Personal life and death ==
Wright was married to Australian actress and singer Abigail until his death.

In 2011, Today Tonight reported that Abigail and Wright were living as squatters in a derelict church. The following evening, A Current Affair correctly reported that they had in fact been living there temporarily, with permission, while their home that had been damaged in the 2011 floods was being rebuilt.

Wright died on 28 November 2015.

== Filmography ==
=== Film ===
Year	Title	Role	Notes
1975	End Play	Andrew Gifford	
1977	Summerfield	Peter Flynn	
1980	Fatness, Foods and Fads	Various characters	Short film
1980	Energy, Food and Exercise	Various characters	Short film
1981	The Survivor	Goodwin	
1986	Sky Pirates	Valentine	
1987	The Lighthorsemen	Lawson	
1990	What the Moon Saw	Kurt	
1990	Friday on My Mind		
1992	Come Rain or Shine		
1993	My Forgotten Man (ask Flynn)	Harold Watts	
1993	Gross Misconduct	Kenneth Carter	
1993	Body Melt	Thompson Noble	
1995	The Final Stage	The Man	

=== Television ===
Year	Title	Role	Notes
1968	ITV Playhouse	Ronnie	1 episode: "Premiere: Foxhole in Bayswater"
1969	Judge Dee	Demon	1 episode
1971	Jamie	Lt. Pascoe	1 episode
1972	The Befrienders	Larry	1 episode
1972	Doomwatch	David	1 episode
1970–1972	Freewheelers	Mike Hobbs	52 episodes
1974	Village Hall	Andy	1 episode
1975	Division 4	Dick	1 episode
1975–1976	Homicide	Various characters	4 episodes
1976	Andra		
1976	Tandarra	Paddy Flynn	Miniseries, 1 episode
1977	Bluey	Geoff Eastman / Alan Palmer	2 episodes
1978	Chopper Squad	Tony Cochran	1 episode
1978	Against the Wind	Lieutenant Burke	Miniseries, 3 episodes
1979	Skyways	Tom Davies	3 episodes
1980	Water Under the Bridge	Leading Man	Miniseries, 1 episode
1980	The Last Outlaw	Constable Fitzpatrick	Miniseries, 4 episodes
1981	Holiday Island	Lindsay Todd	1 episode
1981	Bellamy	Terry	1 episode
1981	The Homicide Squad	Teddy Carmichael	TV movie
1978–1982	Cop Shop	8 roles	17 episodes
1982	1915	Oliver Melrose	Miniseries, 4 episodes
1979–1982	Prisoner	Graham Lang / Neil Murray	17 episodes
1983	All the Rivers Run	Alastair Rayburn	Miniseries, 4 episodes
1984	Carson's Law	Phillip Garrick	23 episodes
1985	Five Mile Creek	The Innkeeper	1 episode
1988; 1990	Mission: Impossible	Don Regehr / Captain Hamidou	2 episodes
1989	Space Knights	Sir Cuthbert Cosmos (voice)	22 episodes
1992	Cluedo	Charles Letan	1 episode
1995	Janus	Alex Robbins	1 episode
1995	Halifax f.p.	David Onslow	Season 1, episode 2
1995	Snowy River: The McGregor Saga	John Hardy	1 episode
1998–2000	Tales of the South Seas	Lt. Jean Morlais	22 episodes

== Theatre ==
Year	Title	Role	Notes
1975	The Revenger's Tragedy		St Martins Theatre, Melbourne with MTC
1976	Travesties		Russell Street Theatre, Melbourne with MTC
1976	Of Mice and Men		Russell Street Theatre, Melbourne with MTC
1976	Othello		Russell Street Theatre, Melbourne with MTC
1979	The Two Tigers	The Man	La Mama, Melbourne with Everyman's Theatre Collective

== Radio ==
Year	Title	Role	Notes
1979	Paradise Disdained	Stinaslas	ABC Radio Melbourne
1979	Kind Hearts and Coronets	Hallward	ABC Radio Melbourne
1979	Cymbeline	Posthumus	ABC Radio Melbourne
