= Boulevard Films =

Boulevard Films was an Australian production company which made a number of movies in the late 1980s and early 1990s, many which were set against a background of the entertainment industry.

== History ==
The company was established in 1981 by Frank Howson and his partner Peter Boyle. Their first feature was Backstage although they were ultimately bought out of the project by the Burrowes Film Group. They then made Boulevard of Broken Dreams, and in 1988 they put together $24.5 million for a slate of seven films: Heaven Tonight, Sinbad, Highway Hero, Beyond My Reach, Hunting, Fallen Angel and Young Flynn. This was an impressive achievement at the time since the Australian film industry was then reeling from a reduction in the 10BA tax concessions. Five of these were made (Sinbad became What the Moon Saw).

In late 1989 it was announced Boulevard would make three more films, Highway Hero, The Envoy, and Friday on My Mind. They also wanted to release a soundtrack album for all of their films. Howson:

From day one when we perceive what style of film it will be, we almost decide how we'd like the poster shot. It may sound funny but it's thought out that carefully. We also incorporate the various songs we'd like to use in our scripts, so that we have a visual page of how the whole thing will end up in terms of the music component. We carefully plan the type and style of the songs that fit into various moods of the film if we haven't got anything in our publishing catalogue or access to something.

A number of Boulevard's early films featured common elements, such as being written and produced by Howson, a backdrop of the entertainment industry, and recurring cast members such as Guy Pearce and Kim Gyngell.

By 1991 Boulevard had made five films but Howson claimed this had caused much resentment:

There has been a lot of animosity in the industry because we seem to be doing so much when others are doing so little. We have done a great deal to restore investors confidence in the local film industry. Strangely, or rather typically, we seem to be resented in some circles for our efforts. No doubt that's the kind of attitude that has made Australia what it is today. We've built up a strong investor base [approximately 30,000 people] at a time when a lot of investors were burnt and ran away from film. We have wooed a lot of those people back.

The first Australian film ever purchased by Miramax was a Boulevard Film "What The Moon Saw". The first Australian film ever purchased by the American Broadcasting Corporation (ABC) was a Boulevard Film "Heaven Tonight". Boulevard also sold their movies to such international distributors as Paramount, Disney, Warners, Skouras, J&M Entertainment, and Village Roadshow, amongst others. Although the company achieved much internationally and discovered such film talents as Guy Pearce, Danielle Spencer, Lachy Hulme, David Roberts, the company collapsed in the mid-1990s due to business partners Howson and Peter Boyle falling out, prompting Howson to move to Hollywood. Between 1998 and 2001 Howson served on the board of the Californian branch of the Starlight Children's Foundation.

Howson, the creative brains behind Boulevard's success, was reportedly distressed by the financial handling of the company by his business partner, Peter Boyle. Howson went on to write and direct various projects in Los Angeles before returning to Australia. In 2006 Howson was awarded the Lifetime Achievement Award by the Melbourne Underground Film Festival. Boyle on the other hand remained in Australia and produced a David Copperfield Tour that became embroiled in litigation.

Boulevard Films produced "Boulevard of Broken Dreams" (nominated for 7 AFI Awards including Best Film and winner of 2, Best Lead Actor (John Waters) and Best Supporting Actor (Kim Gyngell)), "What The Moon Saw" (winner of an AFI Award for Best Costumes), "Heaven Tonight" (nominated for AFI Award for Best Supporting Actor (Kim Gyngell)), the Frank Howson directed "Hunting" (nominated for 2 AFI Awards, Best Lead Actress (Kerry Armstrong) and Best Costume Design), "Beyond My Reach", the Howson directed "Flynn" a.k.a. in some countries as "My Forgotten Man" (nominated for an AFI Award for Best Soundtrack Music Score), "Crime Time", "A Slow Night At The Kuwaiti Café", "The Intruder", the Howson directed "The Final Stage", "A Thin Life", "Blue Roses", "The Making of Heaven Tonight", and "The Lucky Country".

== Filmography ==
- Backstage (1987) - Boulevard were bought out by Burrowes Film Group
- Boulevard of Broken Dreams (1988)
- What the Moon Saw (1989)
- Heaven Tonight (1990)
- Hunting (1991)
- Flynn (filmed 1989 and 1991, released 1996) a.k.a. My Forgotten Man
- Beyond My Reach (1991)
- The Intruder (filmed 1991, not released until 2005)
- Come Rain or Shine (1992)
- The Final Stage (filmed 1991, not released until 2005)
- A Slow Night at the Kuwaiti Cafe (1992)
- Crimetime (1993)
- A Thin Life (1996)

=== Unmade films ===
- Something Great - story of Les Darcy – Howson announced this as a $5.5 million film in 1985 and was still pushing a script on this story in 2005
- Highway Hero – an action film in the vein of Mad Max
- The Envoy – a thriller
- The Lucky Country – proposed $7.5 million film
- Friday on My Mind – a teenage comedy intended to star Guy Pearce. Its budget was $5 million, then was reduced to $2.5 million. In September 1991, the movie was announced as about to start soon but it appears never to have been made.
- Merlin and Son (mid-1990s) – an $11 million 3-D animation feature
