= Tommy Dysart =

Australian actor (1935–2022)

- Dysart in the TV series Prisoner as corrupt officer Jock Stewart.
- Born: Thomas Gibson Dysart; 24 December 1935; Maryhill, Glasgow, Scotland
- Died: 7 June 2022 (aged 86); Melbourne, Victoria, Australia
- Education: National Institute of Dramatic Art (NIDA)
- Occupations: Actor; commercial advertiser
- Years active: 1959–2022

Thomas Gibson Dysart (24 December 1935 – 7 June 2022) was a Scottish-born Australian actor, known for his appearances on television dramas and comedies and in character roles in films and miniseries, and also became known for his work in commercial advertising.

== Early career ==
Dysart graduated from NIDA in 1959, and started his career as a vocalist and performed in theatre.

== Film and TV roles ==
High-profile early roles included appearances in Skippy the Bush Kangaroo, Phoenix Five, and several roles in the Crawford Productions police drama series Homicide, Division 4, Matlock Police and Cop Shop.

Dysart appeared briefly in the series Prisoner in the early 1980s, where he played what is perhaps his best-known acting role, that of vicious and cold prison officer Jock Stewart. In the storyline, after being fired from the prison service Stewart admitted to prisoner Judy Bryant that he was the one responsible for murdering her lover, fellow prisoner Sharon Gilmour. This revelation brought to a close a murder-mystery storyline in the series but launched a long-running story-arc where Bryant repeatedly escaped from prison in a succession of attempts to exact her revenge on Stewart.

After this, Dysart continued in guest-starring television roles in drama series and situation comedies, and appeared in many feature films. His films included The Man from Snowy River (1982), Bliss (1985), Garbo (1992), and Flynn (1996). Television roles of the 1990s included appearances in All Together Now, The Games, State Coroner, Blue Heelers, Something in the Air and Neighbours. He also provided the voice for Captain Griswald in Anthony Lucas' animated short film The Mysterious Geographic Explorations of Jasper Morello (2005).

== Commercial advertisements ==
In the 1990s he appeared in a well-remembered television commercial advertisement for the Yellow Pages where he calls a series of mechanics about his problematic Goggomobil, ("G, O, G, G, O ... No! No! Not the Dart"). He was also known for playing a recurring character of a Mafia-boss-like butcher in advertisements for Don Smallgoods.

In the early 2000s he continued his Goggomobil persona advertising Shannons Insurance. The concept played on the role of a person searching for the car parts as any car enthusiast would. Telstra challenged this in the Supreme Court and Shannons withdrew the advertisements, but continued with Dysart and the accent (which Dysart insisted was his own and could not change). The adverts continue and Shannons Insurance also owns several of the Goggomobil cars which feature regularly in their shows. Dysart and Joan Brockenshire appeared in Karl von Möller's 2019 documentary "D'art".

== Filmography ==
=== Film ===
Year	Title	Role	Notes
1965	Moby Dick - Rehearsed		TV movie
1965	The Big Killing	Sergeant Bassett	TV movie
1969	It Takes All Kinds	Seaman	Feature film
1972	The Resistible Rise of Arturo Ui		TV movie
1982	The Man from Snowy River	Mountain Man	Feature film
1982	Next of Kin	Harry	Feature film
1982	The Clinic	Patient	Feature film
1985	Bliss	De Vere	Feature film
1985	I Live with Me Dad	Griffin	Feature film
1986	Sky Pirates	Bartender	Feature film
1986	The Big Hurt	Schwartz	Feature film
1987	Ground Zero	British Veteran	Feature film
1988	Backstage	Head Waiter - Reception	Feature film
1988	Georgia	Bystander	Feature film
1990	What the Moon Saw	Skip	Feature film
1992	Garbo	Bagpipes	Feature film
1992	Come Rain or Shine		Feature film (starred with son Kole Dysart)
1993	Flynn (aka My Forgotten Man)	Macintosh	Feature film
1993	Body Melt	Sergeant	Feature film
1994	Metal Skin	Mr Graham	Feature film
1995	The Final Stage	Stinky Radford	Feature film
1995	Mushrooms	Wilson	Feature film
1996	River Street	Sergeant	Feature film
1999	Strange Fits of Passion	Taxi Driver	Feature film
2000	Wee Jimmy	Grandad	Short film
2001	Four Jacks	Lance	Feature film
2002	The Real Thing	Husband	Feature film
2005	The Mysterious Geographic Explorations of Jasper Morello	Captain Otto H. Griswald (voice)	Animated short film
2009	Remembering Nigel	Tommy Dysart	Short film (starred with son Kole Dysart)
2009	Crazy in the Night	Jock	Short film
2011	Hands.Hands	Old Man	Short film
2018	A Thin Life	The Man	Feature film
2019	D'art	Self	Documentary film
2021	Frankly - A Life in the Circus	Self	Feature film

=== Television ===
Year	Title	Role	Notes
1963	Consider Your Verdict	Jack McLean	TV series, 1 episode
1965	The Stranger		TV miniseries, 2 episodes
1968	Skippy the Bush Kangaroo	Andrews	TV series, 1 episode
1969	Division 4	George Baker	TV series, 1 episode
1970	The Rovers	Butcher	TV series, 1 episode
1970	Phoenix Five	Gunfighter	TV series, 1 episode
1971, 1973	Matlock Police	Ted Woods / Abdul	TV series, 2 episodes
1974	Silent Number	Sand	TV series, 1 episode
1975	Behind the Legend		TV series, 1 episode
1964-75	Homicide	George Hogan, Jeffrey Hodges, Anthony Scott, Angus Lawrence, Chris Doyle, Van Driver, Osman Rados, Neil Campbell, Nicolo Rogowski	TV series, 9 episodes
1975	Ben Hall	Haigh	TV series, 1 episode
1975	Luke's Kingdom	Lug	TV miniseries, 1 episode
1978	The Truckies		TV series, 1 episode
1978	Against the Wind	Settler / Travers / Drunken Rebel	TV miniseries, 3 episodes
1979	Skyways	Paddy McDonald	TV series, 1 episode
1979	The Sullivans	Fergus McCullough	TV series, 1 episode
1980	Young Ramsay	Paddy Rourke	TV series, 1 episode
1980	Water Under the Bridge	Hamish	TV miniseries, 1 episode
1980	The Last Outlaw	Superintendent	TV miniseries, 4 episodes
1981	Are You Being Served?	Kilted Customer	TV series, 1 episode
1977-81	Cop Shop	Dimonicus, Don Morgan, John Ford, Lawrence Peck	TV series, 7 episodes
1980-82	Prisoner	Jock Stewart	TV series, 12 episodes
1982	Come Midnight Monday	Angus McPhee	TV series, 5 episodes
1982	Women of the Sun	Joe	TV miniseries, 1 episode
1983	Carson's Law	Captain Robinson	TV series, 1 episode
1983	Infinity Limited	Henry	TV series, episode 15: The Big Lift
1984	Five Mile Creek	Trantor	TV series, 1 episode
1984	Special Squad	Scottie / Bingo Caller	TV series, 2 episodes
1984	Eureka Stockade	Tom Kennedy	TV miniseries, 2 episodes
1985	The Fast Lane	Neville	TV series, 1 episode
1985	Trapp, Wrinkle and Box	Various	TV series
1985	Zoo Family	McGregor	TV series, 1 episode
1986	Alice to Nowhere	Fighting Scotsman	TV miniseries, 2 episodes
1986, 1987	The Flying Doctors	Inspector Kevin Day / Simpson	TV series, 2 episodes
1990	Friday on My Mind		
1991	Boys from the Bush	Nick	TV series, 1 episode
1991	All Together Now	Barkeeper	TV series, 1 episode
1991	Chances	Trevor Russell	TV series, 1 episode
1991	Kelly	Sgt Terry Blake	TV series, 2 episode
1992	Round the Twist	Bus Driver	TV series, 1 episode
1992, 1993	The Late Show	Goggomobile Man	TV series, 2 episodes
1994	Wedlocked	Marvin / Hot Dog Man	TV series, 4 episodes
1995	Snowy River: The McGregor Saga	Mr Couch	TV series, 1 episode
1998	Good Guys, Bad Guys	Athol Amoroso	TV series, 1 episode
	The Games	Taxu Driver	TV series, 1 episode
1998	State Coroner	Robert Ash	TV series, 1 episode
2000	Blue Heelers	Jimmy Fong	TV series, season 7, 1 episode
2001	Neighbours	Fergus MacLeod	TV series, 1 episode
2001	Pizza	50s Pizza Couple	TV series, 1 episode
2001	Something in the Air	Roy Suede	TV series, 2 episodes

== Theatre ==
Year	Title	Role	Notes
1975-77	The Rocky Horror Show	Narrator	Regent Palace Theatre, 458 performances

== Personal life ==
Dysart enjoyed a long personal and professional relationship with director and writer Frank Howson. They worked together on the films Backstage, Boulevard of Broken Dreams, What the Moon Saw, Flynn, Crime Time, The Final Stage, Lucky Country, and the award-winning short film Remembering Nigel, which also featured Dysart's wife and son Kole.

Dysart was married to actress Joan Brockenshire. On 18 February 2022, Dysart suffered a stroke and was taken to the Alfred Hospital. He died on 7 June 2022 in Melbourne, Victoria at the age of 86.
