= Final stage =

Final stage or The Final Stage may refer to:

- The Final Stage, 1995 film directed by Frank Howson
- Fifth stage of a bill's passage through a legislative chamber
- In a multi-stage tournament:
  - knockout stage
  - playoffs
- Champs-Élysées stage in the Tour de France

== See also ==
- Liar Game: The Final Stage 2010 Japanese film
- The Last Stage, 1947 Polish film
- "The Final Phase", episode four of The Space Museum, a 1965 Doctor Who television serial
