= Heaven Tonight (film) =

- Directed by: Pino Amenta
- Written by: Frank Howson; Alister Webb
- Produced by: Frank Howson
- Starring: John Waters; Guy Pearce; Kym Gyngell; Rebecca Gilling; Sean Scully
- Cinematography: David Connell
- Production company: Boulevard Films
- Distributed by: Boulevard Films
- Release date: November 1990
- Country: Australia
- Language: English
- Budget: under $2 million

Heaven Tonight is a 1990 Australian film.

== Plot ==
An ageing rock star (John Waters) tries to make a comeback and is jealous about the success of his son (Guy Pearce).

== Cast ==
- John Waters as Johnny Dysart
- Guy Pearce as Paul Dysart
- Kym Gyngell as Baz Schultz
- Rebecca Gilling as Annie Dysart
- Sean Scully as Tim Robbins
- Matthew Weigall as Himself

== Production ==
Writer-producer Frank Howson later claimed that "every incident" in the film was true: "either I have lived it, or I know somebody who has. There is no fabrication, except in the names, which have been changed to protect the guilty."

Howson said "I wrote this movie for all those talented people who had their 15 minutes of fame and then got shut out in the cold."

He said the Baz Schultz character was a combination of Stevie Wright and Ken Firth of The Ferrets.

Waters and Pearce were cast for their singing talent as well as their acting skills, and Pearce released a single, "Call of the Wild", from the film.

Howson said "I’d never seen Guy Pearce on Neighbours, so I hadn’t typecast him so when he came in to audition... I had an open mind and he fitted the part of Paul Dysart to perfection. He also had a very good singing voice, and could play guitar, which was a huge plus, as I wanted to record all the music live."

== Reception ==
The film was not a commercial success and only ran for two weeks in cinemas in Sydney and Melbourne. Tom Ryan in The Age criticised the "hackneyed dialogue", adding that "only the sequence in which Paul watches unseen as his father watches over some old home movies achieves any emotional resonance... elsewhere the plodding dramatics are pretty much in tune with the muzak that affects the soundtrack." Neil Jillett, also of The Age, called Heaven Tonight "a humourless film about a tiresome, self-pitying boor (with) predictable sentimentality."

In 2024, Filmink called it "probably Howson’s best movie... the best structured, possibly due to the input of Alister Webb who is credited as co-writer. It has a strong central situation, the drama works logically and it is excellently cast."

== Cultural references ==
The film provided comedic material for the 2006-2007 Austereo radio comedy show Get This. Host Tony Martin referred to the film on a number of occasions, making jibes at the name of Guy Pearce's character's band which was 'Video Rodney', the frequent references to the film's villain whose name was the ill-chosen 'Tim Robbins' and the 1980s synth-rock music which was seen as passé at the time.
