= Crimetime (disambiguation) =

Crimetime or Crime Time may refer to:

- Crimetime, a 1996 British thriller film
- Crimetime (1993 film), a 1993 Australian film
- Crime Time, a series of animated shorts
- Crimetime After Primetime, a group of CBS late night programs shown in the United States in the 1990s
- Crimetime Saturday, the branding of CBS Saturday night programs in the 21st century

== See also ==
- Cryme Time
