= What the Moon Saw =

- Directed by: Pino Amenta
- Written by: Frank Howson
- Produced by: Frank Howson
- Starring: Andrew Shepherd; Max Phipps; Pat Evison; Kim Gyngell; Danielle Spencer
- Cinematography: David Connell
- Production company: Boulevard Films
- Release date: December 1990
- Country: Australia
- Language: English
- Budget: A$3,350,000
- Box office: A$43,919 (Australia)

What the Moon Saw is a 1990 Australian film directed by Pino Amenta. The first of five films Boulevard Films made following the success of Boulevard of Broken Dreams (1988), it was based on Howson's memories of being a child actor in the theatre.

The musical performed in the film, Sinbad's Last Adventure was written by Howson.

== Plot ==
Steven Wilson travels from the outback to visit his Gran in Melbourne for the school holidays. Gran's former role as a showgirl enables Steven to be drawn in by the magic of the theatre. While watching a performance of Sinbad's Last Adventure, Steven becomes immersed in the story, becoming the sailor himself, and adventure ensues.

== Cast ==
- Andrew Shepherd as Steven Wilson
- Max Phipps as Mr Zachary
- Pat Evison as Gran
- Kim Gyngell as Jim Shilling
- Danielle Spencer as Emma
- Alan Fletcher as Mr Esposito
- Gary Sweet as Alan Wilson
- Adrian Wright as Kurt
- Kurt Ludescher as George
- Tommy Dysart as Skip
- Mark Hennessy as Tony
- Robyn Gibbes as Bev Wilson

== Production ==
Howson had been a child actor and had worked extensively in the theatre. He later said of the film:

I wrote in one long night, and it captured a real energy. Even when I was writing it I had no idea where it was heading. Which is good, because neither did the audience. It’s the only script of mine that didn’t need a polish and that not one actor wanted to change a word of it. It really did capture some kind of magic.

== Reception ==
According to Howson:

It became the first Australian film sold to Miramax and opened the London Film Festival in 1990 and was selected for competition at the prestigious Berlin Film Festival. Even I can’t explain its appeal. In fact, it breaks quite a few rules of the formula movie, and perhaps that’s why it worked. The publicity by-line on the Miramax poster was, “A look at the magic of innocence.” And that’s what it was.

Filmink magazine said "The film is full of charm and had so much... potential, it’s frustrating that it’s not better than it is: it looks splendid, has a magical atmosphere and features fantastic actors... However, once more, as a writer Howson made a series of errors, notably under-utilising his characters and including a dream sequence in act three that goes for twenty minutes."
