= David Argue =

Australian actor (1959–2025)

David J. Argue
- Born: 1959; Melbourne, Victoria, Australia
- Died: 30 July 2025 (aged 65)
- Occupation: Actor
- Years active: 1977–2025

David J. Argue (1959 – 30 July 2025) was an Australian actor. He was best known for his role as Snowy in Gallipoli, as Whitey in BMX Bandits (1983), Dicko in Razorback (1984), and in the leading role of Brad McBain in Hercules Returns (1993).

Filmink praised "his livewire nature, compulsive energy, sense of anarchy, and unpredictability... he seemed dangerous, irreverent, humorous, destructive, and risky, carrying a sense that anything could happen, and would, especially in the face of authority, like an Australian Marx brother or Timothy Carey."

== Life and career ==
Argue left school in grade ten and went to NIDA. He earned a reputation as a talented, charismatic actor whom some found difficult to deal with; he was fired from Phar Lap, Fortunate Life and Great Expectations.

Argue died from cancer on 30 July 2025, at the age of 65.

== Filmography ==
=== Film ===
Year	Film	Role	Notes
1981	Gallipoli	Snowy	Feature film
1981	Instant TV		TV film
1982	Snow: The Movie	Darren	Feature film
1983	Midnite Spares	Rabbit	Feature film
1983	The Return of Captain Invincible	Italian Salesman	Feature film
1983	Going Down	Greg / Trixie	Feature film Nominated — AACTA Award for Best Actor in a Supporting Role
1983	BMX Bandits	Whitey / O'Connor	Feature film Nominated — AACTA Award for Best Actor in a Supporting Role
1984	Melvin, Son of Alvin	Cameraman	Feature film
1984	Razorback	Dicko Baker	Feature film
1984	Stanley	Morris Norris	Feature film
1985	Niel Lynne	Reg	Feature film
1985	The Coca-Cola Kid	Newspaper Vendor	Feature film
1986	Backlash	Trevor Darling	Feature film
1986	Coming of Age	Stoned Cabbie / Street Monster	Feature film
1987	Pandemonium	Kales Leadingham / Ding the Dingo	Feature film
1987	Sharky's Party	Sharky	Short film
1988	Raw Silk	William Perry	TV film
1990	Blood Oath (aka Prisoners of the Sun)	Flight Lieutenant Eddy Fenton	Feature film
1990	The Shrimp on the Barbie	Kevin	Feature film
1991	Breathing Under Water	Bus Conductor	Feature film
1991	Pirates Island	Snerdle	TV film
1992	Hurricane Smith	Shanks	Feature film
1993	Hercules Returns	Brad McBain	Feature film
1993	Crimetime		Feature film
1994	No Escape (aka Escape from Absolom)	Cellmate	Feature film
1995	Napoleon	Frill-necked Lizard, Snake, Galah, Desert Mouse, Turtle (voice roles)	Feature film
1995	Angel Baby	Dave	Feature film
1996	Lilian's Story	Spruiker	Feature film
1996	The Beast	Bates	TV film
2000	On the Beach	Jimmy Nofly	TV film
2010	Road Train	Psycho	Feature film
2010	The Argues: The Movie	Himself	Feature film
2014	The Mule	Keith Rutherford (voice)	Feature film
2021	Astro Loco	Lucien	Feature film

=== Television ===
Year	Film	Role	Notes
1977–79	The Restless Years	Sammy Martin	TV series, 100 episodes
1978–80	Cop Shop	Greg Mann / Russell Nelson / Shane	TV series, 4 episodes
1979	The Sullivans	Freddie	TV series, 1 episode
1982	The Daryl Somers Show	Himself / Peter Allen / Dean Routledge	TV series. 2 episodes
1984	Special Squad	Bazza	TV series, 1 episode
1985	Winners	Bert (Disc Jockey), Communist Agitator	TV series, 2 episodes
1992	Cluedo	Bruno Fume	TV series, 1 episode
1993	Stark	Gordon Gordon	TV miniseries, 1 episode
1994	Newlyweds	Uri	TV series, 2 episodes
1994	Halfway Across the Galaxy and Turn Left	Yorp	TV series, 9 episodes
1995	Correlli	Stephen Haines	TV miniseries. episode: "An Early Release"
1997	Water Rats	Tosee	TV series, episode: "One Dead Rat"

== Stage ==
Year	Film	Role	Notes
1972	Holiday on Ice		Adelaide Festival Centre
1977	The Ruling Class		NIDA Theatre
1978	There were Giants in Those Days	Robin	Nimrod Downstairs
1978	The Job	Jeff	Nimrod Downstairs
1978–80	The Mouth Show	Crunch	Australian tour
1978	Sleeping Beauty on Ice		Princess Theatre, Melbourne
1980	Slipped Disco	Sonny / Byron	The Flying Trapeze Cafe
1980	The First Australian Festival of Cabaret		Garibaldis, Darlinghurst
1985	Bouncers		Seymour Centre
1987	The Country Wife	Sparkish	Sydney Opera House
1991	Hair – The Tribal Love Rock Musical	Woof	Universal Theatre, Melbourne, Athenaeum Theatre, Tweed Heads Seagulls, Newcastle Civic Theatre, University of Sydney, Thebarton Theatre, Townsville Civic Centre, Kuranda, Darwin Performing Arts Centre, Wollongong Civic Centre, Cairns Civic Centre, Princess Theatre, Launceston, Theatre Royal, Hobart, Regal Theatre, Perth, Canberra Theatre
1996	Working: A Musical		Glen Street Theatre with Q Theatre Company
