= David Connell (cinematographer) =

Australian cinematographer

- Born: David Ashley Connell; 7 September 1955 (age 71); Melbourne, Victoria, Australia
- Occupation: Cinematographer

David Ashley Connell (born 7 September 1955) is an Australian cinematographer with a career of over 25 years of cinematographic work in films and television to date.

== Career ==
Connell got his first Super 8 film camera at the age of 12, given to him by his father, sparking an interest in film. In 1972, at the age of 17, Connell became a camera assistant for an Australian news channel. Connell joined Crawford Productions the next year, where he became a camera loader and focus puller, and joined the Australian Cinematographers Society in 1988.

He currently resides in Brighton, Victoria, Australia with his wife Anne.

== Filmography ==
=== Film ===
- King of the Islands (1973)
- Another Winter in Melbourne (1975)
- The Aviator (1985)
- Fortress (1985)
- Frog Dreaming (1986) (replaced Russell Hagg) (with John R. McLean)
- Slate, Wyn & Me (1987)
- Les Patterson Saves the World (1987)
- Boulevard of Broken Dreams (1988)
- The Loco-Motion (1988 music video) (with Brett Anderson)
- What the Moon Saw (1990)
- Heaven Tonight (1990)
- The NeverEnding Story II: The Next Chapter (1990) (credited as Dave Connell)
- Hunting (1991) (with Dan Burstall)
- Fifty/Fifty (1992)
- Over The Hill (1992)
- Secrets (1992)
- Female Misbehavior (1992) (with Ross Berryman, Elfi Mikesch, and Steven C. Brown)
- Gross Misconduct (1993)
- Hercules Returns (1993)
- The Ascent (1994)
- Robinson Crusoe (1997)
- Zeus and Roxanne (1997)
- The Night Flier (1997)
- The Snow Walker (2003)
- News for the Church (2004)
- Left Behind: World at War (2005)
- December Boys (2007)
- Jack and Jill vs. the World (2008)
- Ivanov Red, White, and Blue (2013)
- Bad Samaritan (2018)
- A Gift From Bob (2020)

=== Television ===
- Australia's Hidden Wealth (1982)
- Carson's Law (1982)
- Der schwarze Bumerang (1982) (with Peter W. Tost)
- All the Rivers Run (1983)
- The Flying Doctors (1985) (with Greg Ryan)
- Alice to Nowhere (1986)
- Sword of Honour (1986)
- Nancy Wake (1987)
- Bushfire Moon (1987)
- Barracuda (1988)
- Trouble in Paradise (1989)
- Rose Against the Odds (1991)
- Halfway Across the Galaxy - And Turn Left (1992)
- Lies and Lullabies (1993)
- Rio Diablo (1993)
- Between Love and Hate (1993)
- My Name Is Kate (1994)
- A Day in the Life of Country Music (1993)
- The Only Way Out (1993)
- The Yearling (1994)
- Buffalo Girls (1995)
- Silver Strand (1995)
- Shadow-Ops (1995)
- An Unfinished Affair (1996)
- Twilight Man (1996)
- Bad Day on the Block (1997)
- Clover (1997)
- Forbidden Territory: Stanley's Search for Livingstone (1997)
- Moby Dick (1998)
- Two for Texas (1998)
- Stephen King's Storm of the Century (1999)
- Witch Hunt (1999)
- Cleopatra (1999)
- Chameleon II: Death Match (1999)
- Don Quixote (2000)
- Hell Swarm (2000)
- The Monkey King (2001)
- Rose Red (2002)
- Disappearance (2002)
- Mark Twain's Roughing It (2002)
- Sniper 2 (2002)
- La Femme Musketeer (2004)
- Kingdom Hospital (2004)
- Icon (2005)
- Left Behind: World at War (2005)
- The Triangle (2005)
- Jericho (2006)
- The Lost Room (2006)
- Cane (2007)
- Leverage (2008–2012)
- The Verdict (2008)
- The Librarian: Curse of the Judas Chalice (2008)
- The Quickening (2010)
- Brain Trust (2011)
- Hound Dogs (2011)
- Scent of the Missing (2011)
- Untitled Bounty Hunter Project (2013)
- Crisis (2014)
- The Librarians (2014–2018)
- Rush Hour (2016) (Episode: Pilot)
- Dolly Parton's Heartstrings (2019)

== Awards ==
- 1987: CableACE Award for Direction of Photography and/or Lighting Direction for a Dramatic or Theatrical Special/Movie or Miniseries — Fortress (1986) (won)
- 1988: AACTA Award for Best Achievement in Cinematography — Boulevard of Broken Dreams (1988) (nominated)
- 1989: CableACE Award for Direction of Photography and/or Lighting Direction for a Dramatic or Theatrical Special/Movie or Miniseries — Bushfire Moon (1986) (won)
- 1996: CableACE Award for Cinematography in a Movie or Miniseries — Twilight Man (1996) (nominated)
- 1999: ACS Award of Distinction for Telefeatures, TV Drama & Mini Series — Moby Dick (1998) (won)
- 2006: ACS Award of Distinction for Features — The Snow Walker (2003) (won)
