= The Intruder (2005 film) =

- Directed by: Richard Wolstencroft
- Written by: Frank Howson
- Produced by: Frank Howson
- Starring: Tottie Goldsmith; Lachy Hulme; Greg Parker
- Cinematography: Greg Ravenscroft
- Production company: Boulevard Films
- Release date: 2005 (DVD)
- Country: Australia
- Language: English

The Intruder is an Australian film produced by Frank Howson. The movie had to be abandoned during filming in 1991 due to the financial troubles of Boulevard Films. However the film was completed and released on DVD in 2005.

It was also known as Deliver Us from Evil.

== Plot ==
A married couple return home to find an intruder is in their house. The intruder engages in a series of mind games.
