= Nicholas Bell =

British-Australian actor

- Born: 15 August 1958 (age 68); Huddersfield, Yorkshire, England, UK
- Occupation: Actor
- Years active: 1962–present

Nicholas Bell (born 15 August 1958) is an English actor who has worked mostly in Australia.

== Early life and education ==
Nicholas Bell was born in Huddersfield, West Riding of Yorkshire, England.

== Career ==
Bell has worked regularly with the Melbourne Theatre Company as well as with all the major television broadcasters in Australia, most notably the Australian Broadcasting Corporation. In addition to his work in film and television, Bell has recorded many audiobooks with Bolinda, a company based in Melbourne.

In 2001, he accepted on behalf of the cast and crew of the Australian comedy series The Games the TV Week Logie Award for Most Outstanding Comedy Program.

In 2023, Bell appeared in the Stan series Scrublands, as well as the Tasmanian drama series Bay of Fires.

Also in 2023, Bell was named in the extended cast of the Foxtel/Binge series High Country.

== Filmography ==
=== Film ===
Year	Title	Role	Notes
1990	Father	Paul Jamieson	
1990	Hunting	Piggott	
1993	Gross Misconduct	Det. Matthews	
1994	Paperback Romance	Sophie's Doctor	
1995	Mighty Morphin Power Rangers: The Movie	Zordon	
1995	Hotel Sorrento	Edwin	
1996	Shine	Ben Rosen	
1998	Dead Letter Office	Kevin	
1998	Dark City	Mr. Rain	
1999	The Craic	Derek Johnson	
2000	The Dish	TV Scientist	Uncredited
2000	Mission: Impossible 2	McCloy's Accountant	
2003	Take Away	Squire	
2003	Bad Eggs	Detective Wicks	
2003	Ned Kelly	Richard Cook	
2005	The Great Raid	Duke	
2006	Charlotte's Web	Church Minister	
2006	The Caterpillar Wish	Father Caleb	
2006	Opal Dream	Judge McNulty	
2007	Noise	Snr. Det. Noel Burchall	
2009	Prey	Bill	
2010	Don't Be Afraid of the Dark	Psychiatrist	
2010	I Love You Too	Alice's Dad	
2011	Taj	Tony	
2012	Dangerous Remedy	Dr. Troup	
2012	Crawlspace	Caesar	
2012	Kath & Kimderella	Priest	
2014	I, Frankenstein	Carl Avery	
2022	Elvis	Senator James Eastland	

=== Television ===
Year	Title	Role	Notes	Ref
1962	Dixon of Dock Green	Billy	Episode: "Cash and Carry"	
1963	Walter and Connie	William	Episode: "Walter and Connie in the Country"	
1981	Strangers	Roger Wood	Episode: "Soldiers of Misfortune"	
1981	My Father's House	Ray	2 episodes	
1982	The Agatha Christie Hour	Jeremy	Episode: "The Manhood of Edward Robinson"	
1987	Inspector Morse	Dr. Swain	Episode: "The Wolvergate Tongue"	
1987	Walter Dixon's Wombat	Frank	Television film	
1988	Tickets for the Titanic	Canvasser	Episode: "Everyone a Winner"	
1989	Mission: Impossible	Braun	Episode: "Command Performance"	
1990	Skirts	Gary Block	40 episodes	
1990	More Winners: Boy Soldiers	Commandant	Television film	
1991	Neighbours	Martin Tyrell	5 episodes	
1992–1993	The New Adventures of Black Beauty	Weeks	Season 2, 23 episodes	
1993	RFDS	John	Episode: "Cave-In"	
1994	Sky Trackers	Dan	Episode: "Rocket to Me"	
1994–1997	Ocean Girl	Dr. Hellegen	41 episodes	
1995	Correlli	Holland	Episode: "Lock-Down"	
1995	Frontline	Mike Moore's Doctor	Episode: "Heroes and Villains"	
1995	The Feds: Deception	Stephen Garrard	Television film	
1995–2003	Blue Heelers	Various	5 episodes	
1996	One West Waikiki	George	Episode: "The South Seas Connection"	
1997	State Coroner	Provis	Episode: "Start With a Bang"	
1997	Good Guys, Bad Guys	Dennis	Episode: "Bloody Nosy"	
1997–1998	Raw FM	Neil Mulholland	4 episodes	
1998	Driven Crazy	Principal	Episode: "Love Bug"	
1998	The Genie from Down Under 2	Nigel Huntly	2 episodes	
1998	Chameleon	Cam's Controller	Television film	
1998–2000	The Games	Nicholas	21 episodes	
1998–2001	Stingers	Bill Hollister	27 episodes	
1999	Halifax f.p.	Barry	Episode: "Swimming with Sharks"	
2000	Tales of the South Seas	The Major	Episode: "The Assassin"	
2000	The Magicians	Thompson	Television film	
2001	The Micallef P(r)ogram(me)	Greg / Guildford Four	2 episodes	
2001	The Lost World	Edgar Gray	Episode: "The Outlaw"	
2001	Abschied in den Tod	Archie	Television film	
2002	MDA	Oliver Maudson	2 episodes	
2002	Something in the Air	Michael Fox	5 episodes	
2003	Crashburn	Clive	Episode: "The Treeman Show"	
2003	Kath & Kim	Airline Rep	Episode: "The Moon"	
2004	Salem's Lot	Frank	TV miniseries, 1 episode	
2004	Am Hap der Liebe	Jonathan	Television film	
2005	The Secret Life of Us	Marc	Season 4, 3 episodes	
2005	The Surgeon	Julian Sierson	8 episodes	
2005	Holly's Heroes	Mr. Crawford	Episode: "Double Team"	
2005	Scooter: Secret Agent	Stepford	Episode: "Operation: Replication"	
2005	Life	William Burton	Television film	
2005	Attack of the Sabretooth	Niles	Television film	
2006	Tripping Over	James Frost	5 episodes	
2006	Real Stories	Gordon	1 episode	
2006	Nightmares and Dreamscapes	Health Official	Episode: "The End of the Whole Mess"	
2006	Wicked Science	Virgil	Episode: "Meet the Parents"	
2007	The Librarians	Barrister	Episode: "And Nothing But the Truth"	
2007–2008	Satisfaction	Alexander	Season 1, 8 episodes	
2008	Underbelly	Colin	Episode: "Underbelly"	
2008	Monash: The Forgotten Anzac	General Rawlinson	Television film	
2012	Rake	John Garden	Episode: "Rake vs Alford"	
2012	Conspiracy 365	Rathbone	4 episodes	
2012	Lowdown	Jeremy Bristol	Episode: "Pretty Pollie"	
2012	Howzat! Kerry Packer's War	Clive Bell	2 episodes	
2012	Miss Fisher's Murder Mysteries	Murdoch Foyle	5 episodes	
2012	Tangle	Sean Roscoe	5 episodes	
2012	Australia on Trial	George	Episode: "Massacre at Myall Creek"	
2012	Jack Irish Bad Debts	Martin Scullin	Television film	
2007–2008	Newstopia	Various	30 episodes	
2007–2008	All Saints	Oliver Maroney	9 episodes	
2007–2009	City Homicide	Gordon / Mark	2 episodes	
2009	Dirt Game	Nigel Hay	6 episodes	
2010	Sleuth 101	Ern / Ian	2 episodes	
2011	Rush	Brett Cohen	2 episodes	
2011	Sea Patrol	Jack	Episode: "Lifeline"	
2011	Killing Time	Rod Conroy	1 episode	
2013	Serangoon Road	Maxwell Black	3 episodes	
2013	Power Games: The Packer–Murdoch War	Rupert Henderson	1 episode	
2013	Upper Middle Bogan	French Man	Episode: "Forefathers and Two Mothers"	
2013	The Doctor Blake Mysteries	Robert Waterman	Episode: "Game of Champions"	
2013–2018	Shaun Micallef's Mad as Hell	Various	15 episodes	
2014	ANZAC Girls	General William Birdwood	Episode: "Courage"	
2014	The Time of our Lives	Caroline's Lawyer	Episode: "The Negoitation"	
2014	Parer's War	Bob Hawes	Television film	
2015	Childhood's End	Major General Cal	Episode: "The Overlords"	
2015–2016	Winners & Losers	Keith Maxwell	5 episodes	
2015–2017	The Ex-PM	Sonny	12 episodes	
2016	Wentworth	Dr. Foster	Episode: "Prisoner"	
2016–2017	Wanted	Ray Stanton	10 episodes	
2017	Seven Types of Ambiguity	Gorman	2 episodes	
2018	A Place to Call Home	Neil Burton	3 episodes	
2018	True Story with Hamish & Andy	Brother Davies	Episode: "Jeremy"	
2018	Underbelly Files: Chopper	Detective Damian Bugg	Part II	
2018–2021	The Bureau of Magical Things	Sean Regan	19 episodes	
2019	Secret Bridesmaids' Business	Bill Cotterill	6 episodes	
2021	Ms Fisher's Modern Murder Mysteries	Announcer	2 episodes	
2021	How to Stay Married	Brian	2 episodes	
2022	Shantaram	Professor Carr	2 episodes	
2022	Thai Cave Rescue	Vern Unsworth	Episode: "To Not Offend Gods"	
2023	Scrublands	Max Fuller	3 episodes	
2023	Queen of Oz	Michael Grayston	Episode: "There's a New Queen in Town"	
2023–present	Bay of Fires	Graham	7 episodes	
2024	High Country	Senior Sergeant Cripps	3 episodes	
2025	Mystery Road: Origin	Garry	6 episodes	
2025	Imposter	Bill Naylor	TV series: 2 episodes	

== Theatre ==
Year	Title	Role	Company
	Voice of the Prairie	Barney	Soho Poly Theatre
	Blood, Swear and Tears	Cooper	
	An Ideal Husband		
	Lady Windermere's Fan		
	Piaf		York Theatre Royal
	The Secret Diary of Adrian Mole		York Theatre Royal
1983	See How They Run!	Intruder	York Theatre Royal
	Cider with Rosie	Jack	York Theatre Royal
1983	Having a Ball	Anestecista	York Theatre Royal
1983	Once a Catholic	Cuthbert	York Theatre Royal
1983	Relatively Speaking	Gordon	York Theatre Royal
1983	Breezeblock Park	John-John	York Theatre Royal
1983	Hamlet	Rosencrantz	York Theatre Royal
1985	Hamlet	Sailor 2	Barbican Theatre with Royal Shakespeare Company
1985–96	Richard III	Earl of Surrey / Lord Grey	Royal Shakespeare Company & Australian tour
1985	Henry V	Soldado	Barbican Theatre with Royal Shakespeare Company
1985	Rattle of a Simple Man	Rick	Civic Theatre
1985	Equus		Civic Theatre
1985	Pinnochio	Harlequin	Civic Theatre
1985	You're a Good Man, Charlie Brown	Charlie Brown	Civic Theatre
1985	What the Butler Saw	Nick	Civic Theatre
1985	Dangerous Corner	Gordon	Civic Theatre
1985	Romeo and Juliet	Romeo	Civic Theatre
1985	Red Noses	Mistral	Barbican Theatre with Royal Shakespeare Company
1985	Love's Labours Lost	Villager	Barbican Theatre with Royal Shakespeare Company
1986	Richard III		Festival Theatre, Adelaide, State Theatre, Melbourne, Lyric Theatre, QPAC
1991	Bouncers	Eric	Universal Two
1992	Twelfth Night	Sir Toby Belch	Adelaide Botanic Gardens
1993; 1994	A Midsummer Night's Dream	Bottom	Royal Botanic Gardens Melbourne
1997	After Dinner	Gordon	Fairfax Studio with Melbourne Theatre Company
2004	The Memory of Water	Frank	Space 28 with Melbourne Theatre Company
2006	The Dumb Show	Greg	Melbourne Theatre Company
2006	Festen	Lars	Fairfax Studio with Melbourne Theatre Company
2007	Enlightenment	Nick	Fairfax Studio with Melbourne Theatre Company
2008	The Winterling	Len West	Red Stitch Actors Theatre
2008	The Great	Arzobispo / Orlo	Sydney Theatre Company
2008	The Hypocrite	Cleante	Playhouse, Melbourne with Melbourne Theatre Company
2009	Tender		Southbank Theatre with Melbourne Theatre Company
2010	Madagascar	Nathan	Fairfax Studio with Melbourne Theatre Company
2010	Richard III	King Edward IV / Stanley	Southbank Theatre with Melbourne Theatre Company
2012	8 - The Play		Her Majesty's Theatre, Melbourne, Sydney Town Hall
2012	Promises, Promises		State Theatre, Melbourne
2013	War Horse	Uncle Arthur	State Theatre, Melbourne, Sydney Lyric Theatre, Lyric Theatre QPAC, The National Theatre of GB with Global Creatures
2014	The Speechmaker	White House Chief of Staff Bob	Playhouse, Melbourne with Melbourne Theatre Company
2015	Wet House	Dinger	Red Stitch Actors Theatre
2015	Dreamers		Fortyfivedownstairs
2015–16	North by Northwest	The Newsreader	Playhouse, Melbourne, State Theatre, Melbourne with Melbourne Theatre Company
2018	North by Northwest	The Newsreader & various roles	Festival Theatre, Adelaide, Lyric Theatre QPAC
2018	The Architect	John Stafford	Melbourne Theatre Company
2019	The Lady in the Van	Underwood / Leo Fairchild / Doctor	Melbourne Theatre Company
2019	Golden Shield	Judge Durham	Southbank Theatre with Melbourne Theatre Company
2022	North by Northwest	The Newsreader & various roles	Sydney Lyric Theatre
2022	Into the Woods	Jack	Laycock St Theatre

== Audiobooks ==
- Reader of Murder at the Nineteenth by J. M. Gregson, 2001
- Reader of the part of Julian in Us by Richard Mason, 2005
- Reader of In the Evil Day by Peter Temple, 2008
- Reader of The Lieutenant by Kate Grenville, 2008
- Reader of Hurry Up and Meditate by David Michie, 2008
- Reader of John by Niall Williams, 2008
- Reader of Jesus of Nazareth by Pope Benedict XVI, 2008
- Reader of Walking Ollie by Stephen Foster, 2008
- Reader of Buddhism for Busy People: Finding Happiness in an Uncertain World by David Michie, 2008
- Reader of Along Came Dylan by Stephen Foster, 2008
- Reader of The Leader's Way by the Dalai Lama and Laurens van den Muyzenberg, 2009
- Reader of Barack Obama: The Movement for Change by Anthony Painter, 2009
- Reader of Think! Before It's Too Late by Edward de Bono, 2010
