= Trial of Ned Kelly =

- Written by: Roger Simpson; Dr L Robson
- Directed by: John Gauci
- Starring: John Waters; Gerard Kennedy; Peter Cummins; Sean Scully; Jonathan Hardy
- Narrated by: Alan Hopgood
- Country of origin: Australia
- Original language: English

Production
- Producer: Oscar Whitbread
- Running time: 65 mins
- Production company: ABC

Original release
- Release: 12 September 1977 (Sydney)
- Release: 26 October 1977 (Melbourne)

Trial of Ned Kelly is a 1977 Australian TV film about the trial of Ned Kelly.

== Cast ==
- John Waters as Ned Kelly
- Gerard Kennedy as Prosecutor Smyth
- John Frawley as Judge Redmond Barry
- Ian Suddards as defence counsel
- Peter Cummins as Sgt McIntyre
- Jonathan Hardy
- Sean Scully
- Alan Hopgood as Narrator

== Production ==
Filming took place at the Old Melbourne Gaol Magistrate's Court and at Gembrook, Victoria, which stood in for Stringybark Creek. Roger Simpson wrote it in collaboration with Dr Robson, a lecturer in history at Melbourne University. The original chair and canopy used by Judge Barry was used.

== Reception ==
The Age praised "another fine performance from Waters".

Another writer from the same paper thought the production was not as good as the script.

The Sydney Sun Herald said "it fails to keep its dramatic promise" mostly because of the device of using Alan Hopgood as a narrator who would appear in the action.
