= Bruce Myles =

Australian actor

- Born: 29 November 1940 (age 85); Sydney, Australia
- Occupation: Actor
- Years active: 1963–present

Bruce Myles (born 29 November 1940) is an Australian actor and film director. He has appeared in 40 films and television shows since 1963. In 1987, along with Michael Pattinson, he co-directed the film Ground Zero. It was entered into the 38th Berlin International Film Festival.

In 2004, he adapted The Call, Martin Flanagan's 1998 novel about cricketer and Australian rules football pioneer Tom Wills, into a stage play.

== Filmography ==
Year	Title	Role	Notes
1971	The Night Digger	Bank Clerk	
1984	Every Move She Makes	Defender	TV film
1987	Ground Zero		Director
1988	Evil Angels (a.k.a. A Cry in the Dark)	Barker	
1990	Breakaway	Reginald	
1991	Sweet Talker	Mayor Jim Scraper	
1991	A Woman's Tale	Con 1	
2001	The Bank	Ben	
2002	Queen of the Damned	Talamascan	
2003	Peter Pan	Bank Manager	
2003	Max's Dreaming	George	
2006	The Caterpillar Wish	Mr. Woodbridge	
2008	Salvation	Barry	
