= Gregory Apps =

Australian film casting consultant and actor

Greg Apps
- Born: Gregory Richard Apps; 21 August 1955 (age 70)
- Education: Newington College
- Occupations: Casting director; actor
- Years active: 1973 to present
- Spouse: Robyn Gibbes
- Website: Greg Apps Casting

Gregory Richard Apps is an Australian film casting consultant and actor. He cast Russell Crowe, Guy Pearce, Eric Bana, Sam Worthington, and Hugo Weaving in the roles that brought them to wide public recognition.

== Early life ==
Apps was born in 1955, and from 1967 until 1973 he attended Newington College.

== Career ==
In the 1970s, Apps began his working life as an actor. He appeared in the films The Chant of Jimmie Blacksmith, Mad Dog Morgan and Sunday Too Far Away and on stage in the original Melbourne/Adelaide production of The Rocky Horror Show.

In 1982, Apps first started casting at the ABC Melbourne. He has since cast TV commercials, TV series and over 70 feature films. For seven years he was on the board of the Australian Film Institute and he is the current president of the Casting Guild of Australia.

== Personal life ==
Apps is married to Australian actress and casting director, Robyn Gibbes.

== Credits (as actor) ==
=== Film ===
Year	Title	Role	Notes
1975	Sunday Too Far Away	Michael Simpson	
1976	Mad Dog Morgan	Arthur	
1978	The Chant of Jimmie Blacksmith	Smith	
1990	Hunting	Julian Penn	
2002	Garage Days	University Professor	

=== Television ===
Year	Title	Role	Notes
1974	Class of '75	Graham Blair	
1975	Homicide	Barry Fielding	1 episode
1976	Bluey	Kevin Curran	1 episode
1977–1979	The Young Doctors	Martin Price	216 episodes
1978	Chopper Squad	The Robber	1 episode
1983	Home	Jack	3 episodes

=== Theatre ===
Year	Title	Role	Notes
1975–1977	The Rocky Horror Show	Brad	Melbourne / Adelaide with Harry M. Miller
