= Niel Lynne =

Neil Lynne
- Directed by: David Baker
- Written by: David Baker; Paul Davies (writer)
- Based on: an idea by David Baker
- Produced by: Tom Burstall
- Starring: Paul Williams; Sigrid Thornton; Judy Morris; Brandon Burke; David Argue
- Cinematography: Bruce McNaughton
- Edited by: Don Saunders
- Music by: Chris Neal
- Production company: Niel Lynne Productions
- Release date: 1985
- Running time: 125 minutes
- Country: Australia
- Language: English
- Budget: AU$1.9 million

Niel Lynne (also known as Best Enemies) is a 1985 Australian film about a young man during the 1960s.

== Plot ==
Niel Lynne (Paul Williams) is a romantic influenced by his rebellious cousin Eric. Niel falls in love with his cousin Patricia (Judy Morris), who has spent time in Paris.

Patricia then goes to Canberra. Neil joins Eric in Melbourne, where Eric is dating the beautiful Fennimore (Sigrid Thornton). After working as an editor for a student newspaper, Niel then volunteers to fight in Vietnam and Patricia joins the Viet Cong. They are finally reunited and get married.

== Cast ==
- Paul Williams as Niel
- Judy Morris as Patricia
- Terry McDermott as Rob Lynne
- David Argue as Reg
- Sigrid Thornton as Fennimore
- George Mallaby as Mike O'Brien
- Nina Landis as Helen
- Nicki Paull as Melissa
- Esme Melville as Old Woman
- Harold Baigent as Guard
- Brandon Burke as Eric

== Production ==
David Baker tried to get the film made for eight years. The script was inspired by 'Siren Voices', Henry Handel Richardson's 1896 translation of a story by Danish writer, J.P. Jacobs, Niels Lyhne. It was originally set in the 1930s but Baker updated it to the Vietnam War.

The film was funded by a pre-sale to Channel Seven and to the Australian Film Commission's Special Production Fund. It was shot over seven weeks in and around Melbourne.

The film finished under budget and the management company making the film were allowed to be reimbursed up to 10% of the $1.9 million budget if the production ran under – Niel Lynne ran under budget to almost exactly that amount and the money was paid out as bonuses.

David Baker cut eleven minutes from the film including a subplot involving Nicki Paull as Lynne's teenage bride who is killed in a car accident.

== Release ==
Despite the strength of its cast, the film was never released to cinemas and went straight to television. It was later released in America on video under the title Best Enemies.
