= Breakaway (1990 film) =

- Directed by: Don McLennan
- Written by: Jan Sardi
- Produced by: Don McLennan; Jane Ballantyne; Les Lithgow
- Starring: Bruce Boxleitner; Bruce Myles; Deborah Unger; Toni Scanlan; Terry Gill
- Cinematography: Zbigniew Friedrich
- Edited by: Nicolas Lee
- Music by: Peter Sullivan
- Production company: Breakaway Films
- Distributed by: Smart Egg Pictures
- Release dates: 1 August 1990 (Netherlands); October 1990 (Australia)
- Running time: 85 mins
- Countries: Australia; United Kingdom
- Language: English

Breakaway (also known as Escape from Madness) is a 1990 Australian thriller film starring Bruce Boxleitner, Bruce Myles and Deborah Unger. It is directed by Don McLennan.

== Plot ==
An escaped prisoner abducts an accountant as he tracks a rodeo fair which is sheltering his wife.

== Cast ==
- Bruce Boxleitner as Joey
- Bruce Myles as Reginald
- Deborah Unger as Marion
- Toni Scanlan
- Terry Gill as Hank Stardust
- David Hoflin as Geoffrey
- Tiffany Lamb as Tanya
- Mike Bishop as De Silva

== Production ==
Filming took place in Victoria, Australia from 31 July – 9 September 1989.

== Release ==
The film was released on video on a dubbed VHS in Germany by Highlight Video, on a Dutch-Subtitled VHS in the Netherlands by Excalibur Benelux and in Canada on NTSC VHS by Alliance Releasing. In the United Kingdom, it was released on video as Escape from Madness.

The film has never been released on any format in the United States.
