= Rebecca Rigg =

Australian actress

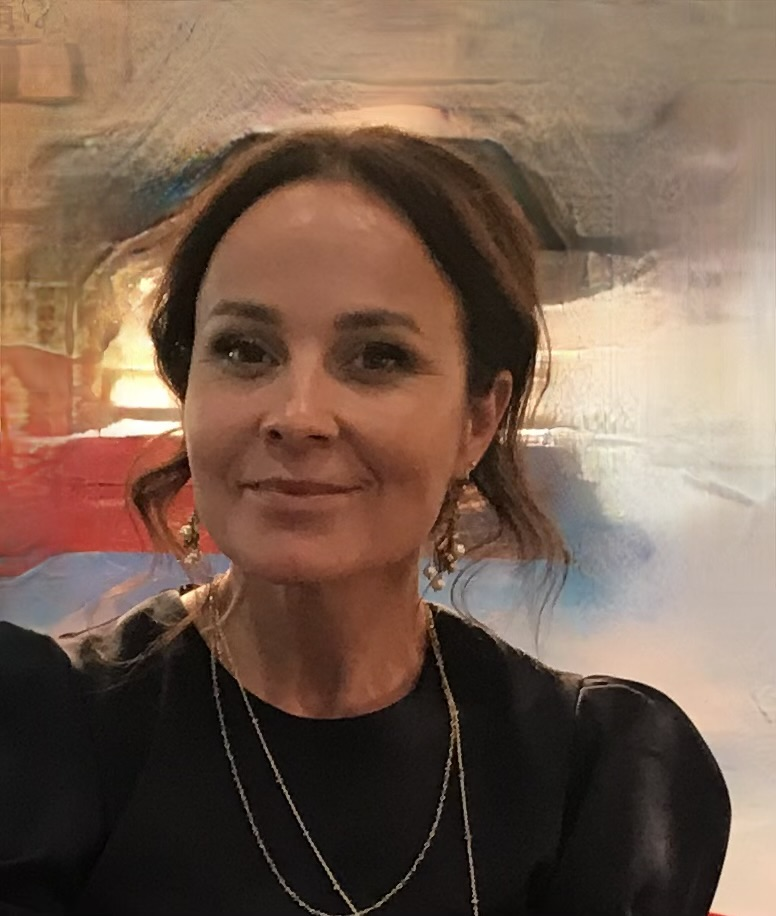
- Rigg in 2018
- Born: Sydney, Australia
- Occupation: Actress
- Years active: 1977–present
- Spouse: Simon Baker (m. 1998; sep. 2020)
- Children: 3, including Stella

Rebecca Rigg is an Australian actress in television and film. She started out as a child actor in Fatty Finn (1980), and was later featured in the films Hunting (1991), Spotswood (1992) and Ellie Parker (2005).

== Early life and career ==
Her Australian television appearances include the television series Rafferty's Rules (in which she appeared as the daughter of the Magistrate, Michael Rafferty); and the ABC television movies Joh's Jury, Come In Spinner, and Naked. She had a starring role in the Australian comedy television series Willing and Abel (in which she appeared as "Angela Reddy"). As a young girl she was also in the Australian film Fortress, which was about the kidnapping of a teacher (played by Rachel Ward) and a small class of students. She appeared in the television miniseries Emma: Queen of the South Seas.

She has made guest appearances in other Australian television series, including her brief recurring role of troubled teen Gabe in A Country Practice, The Flying Doctors, G.P., Blue Heelers and Winners.

Rigg had a role as Nurse Amy as part of the Mr Bad storyline on hugely popular Australian soap E Street, playing the girlfriend of her real-life boyfriend at the time, and future husband, Simon Baker.

Rigg appeared in the films Ellie Parker and Fair Game with Naomi Watts. She also guest starred alongside her husband in The Mentalist episode, "A Dozen Red Roses".

== Personal life ==
Rigg married Simon Baker in 1998 after five years together, and they have three children, including actress Stella Baker. They lived in Los Angeles from 1995 until 2015, when they moved back to Sydney, Australia. Rigg and Baker separated in April 2020.

== Filmography ==
=== Film ===
Year	Title	Role	Notes
1980	Fatty Finn	Tilly	
1981	Doctors and Nurses	Mercia King	
1982	Monkey Grip	Michelle	
1989	Flynn	Penelope Watts	Later replaced by Claudia Karvan in reshoots
1991	Hunting	Debbie McCormick	
1992	Spotswood	Cheryl Ball	a.k.a. The Efficiency Expert
1995	Tunnel Vision	Helena Martinelli	
1996	Jerry Maguire	Former Girlfriend	
2005	Ellie Parker	Sam	Originally a 2001 short film

=== Television ===
Year	Title	Role	Notes
1980	The Restless Years	Sandra Harper	TV series
1982–1984	A Country Practice	Gabe	Recurring role, 28 episodes
1985	Winners	Katrin	Episode: "Quest Beyond Time"
1985	Fortress	Narelle	TV movie
1986	The Great Bookie Robbery	Tessa	TV miniseries
1987	Willing and Abel	Angela Reddy	Main role
1987	The Flying Doctors	Trisha Farley	Episode: "Every Day a Gift"
1988	All The Way	Sandy	2 episodes
1988	Emma: Queen of the South Seas	Phebe Coe Parkinson	TV miniseries
1990	Family and Friends	Pasquelina	TV series
1990	Come In Spinner	Shirley Noonan	TV miniseries
1992–1993	E Street	Amy Preston	Recurring role
1993	Joh's Jury	Madonna	TV movie
1993	Mercy Mission: The Rescue of Flight 771	Ellen	TV movie
1994	Cody	Claudia (art thief)	Episode 1.3
1995	Blue Heelers	Kate Kenny	Episodes: "Double Jeopardy, Parts 1 & 2"
1996	Naked: Stories of Men	Olivia	Episode: "Fisherman's Wake"
1997	The Guardian	Tess	TV movie
1997	The Sentinel	Margaret	Episode: "Blind Man's Bluff"
1997–1998	Michael Hayes	Lindsay Straus	Main role
1998–1999	L.A. Doctors	Kelly Newman	Recurring role, 9 episodes
2006	BlackJack	Lisa Lindon	Episode: "At the Gates"
2009	The Mentalist	Felicia Scott / Woman	Episodes: "A Dozen Red Roses", "Red Sauce" (uncredited)
