= John Frawley (actor) =

Australian actor

- Born: John Mortimer Frawley; 18 August 1929; Australia
- Died: 3 March 1999 (aged 69); Melbourne, Victoria, Australia
- Occupation: Actor
- Years active: 1955–1996

John Mortimer Frawley (18 August 1929 – 3 March 1999) was an Australian character actor with numerous stage, television and film credits to his name, he also worked in the United Kingdom.

He is not to be confused with another actor named John Frawley who had an uncredited role in the Lesley Selander 1948 US western film Panhandle (film).

== Early career ==
Frawley started his professional career in theatre productions from 1955, including a lengthy national tour of Shakespeares Twelfth Night and later performed in King Lear.

He started his television career in the United Kingdom during the 1960s, which included appearing in episodes of The Prisoner and espionage series The Avengers.

== Films ==
Frawley appeared in several small roles in Australian films during the 1970s, 1980s and 1990s. His film roles of the 1970s included football comedy The Great Macarthy (1975) starring John Jarratt. the Fred Schepisi coming of age drama The Devil's Playground and adventure film Eliza Fraser (both 1976).

Others were mystery drama The Last Wave (1977) alongside Richard Chamberlain, thriller The Night the Prowler and family film Blue Fin (both 1978).

His 1980's films included the horror film Harlequin (1980) with Robert Powell, Annie's Coming Out (1984), Call Me Mr. Brown (1986) and comedy Backstage (1988) with Laura Branigan.

Frawley's 1990s films included the black comedy drama Dallas Doll, with Sandra Bernhard (1994), and the period adventure film Flynn starring Guy Pearce, his final screen appearance in 1996

== Television ==
During the 70s and 80s he also appeared on the small screen including the 1977 made-for-television film Trial of Ned Kelly, together with John Waters and Gerard Kennedy. as well as television series, with guest roles in Homicide, Division 4, Matlock Police, Marion and Cop Shop.

He returned to television in the 1980s and 1990s, with appearances in prison drama Prisoner (a.k.a. Prisoner: Cell Block H). From 1985 to 1986, Frawley played Dr Frank Turner in medical drama The Flying Doctors for 24 episodes. In 1990, he had a recurring role as Derek Wilcox in long-running soap opera Neighbours. He also appeared in 1991 Logie Award-winning miniseries Brides of Christ alongside Naomi Watts and Russell Crowe.

== Death ==
Frawley died suddenly of undisclosed causes at his Melbourne home on 3 March 1999, at the age of 69.

== Filmography ==
=== Film ===
Year	Title	Role	Notes
1975	The Great Macarthy	Webster	
1976	The Devil's Playground	Brother Celian	
1976	The Trespassers		
1976	Eliza Fraser	Brown	
1977	The Last Wave	Policeman	
1978	The Night, the Prowler	Humphrey Bannister	
1978	Blue Fin		
1980	Harlequin	Dr Lovelock	
1984	Annie's Coming Out	Harding	
1986	The Humpty Dumpty Man		
1986	Call Me Mr. Brown	Captain Howson	
1988	Backstage		
1994	Dallas Doll		
1996	Flynn (aka My Forgotten Man)	Headmaster	

=== Television ===
Year	Title	Role	Notes
1962	Probation Officer	Jeweller	1 episode
1962	Compact	Theatre doorman	1 episode
1962	Out of This World	Furrier	1 episode
1962	Emergency Ward 10	Mr Ricardo	1 episode
1962	The Avengers	Autograph-Hunting Passenger / Reynolds	2 episodes
1962	The Tommy Steele Show: Quincy's Quest	Ted	TV movie
1963	Ghost Squad	Detective	1 episode
1963	ITV Television Playhouse	Barman	Anthology series, episode: "There Could Be a Knighthood in It"
1964	Consider Your Verdict		1 episode
1964	Thorndyke	Croupier	1 episode
1964	The Plane Makers	Air Vice-Marshal Sloane	1 episode
1964	The Indian Tales of Rudyard Kipling	Major	1 episode
1965	Front Page Story	Features Editor	1 episode
1966	Knock on Any Door	Wicks	1 episode
1966	Adam Adamant Lives!	Sir Charles Thetford	1 episode
1967	The Saint	The Doctor	1 episode
1967	The Prisoner	Flowerman	1 episode
1967–1974	Homicide	Supt. Les Holding / Mr Enright / Dr. Frank Clarkson / Banker / Soames / Joe Martino	6 episodes
1971–1975	Division 4	Downley / Councillor Braden Smith / Harold Sloane / Franklin / Magistrate	5 episodes
1971–1975	Matlock Police	Ray Murray / Dell / Peter Hughes / Gov. Mitchell / Father Gilbert	5 episodes
1972	Behind the Legend	Thomas Blamey	Anthology series, episode: "Thomas Blamey"
1973	Frank and Francesca		Miniseries, 6 episodes
1974	Marion	Jamie Finnegan	Miniseries, 4 episodes
1975	Cash and Company	Jessica's father-in-law	Miniseries, 3 episodes
1975	Quality of Mercy		Anthology series, episode 6: "We Should Have Had a Uniform"
1976	Silent Number	Osborne	1 episode
1977	Opening Night	Det. Inspector Fox	TV movie
1977	Trial of Ned Kelly	Judge Redmond Barry	TV movie
1978–1981	Cop Shop	Judge / Daniel Parker / Graham Metcalfe / Bert Harrison / Neill Harris	7 episodes
1979	Skyways	Judge Smith	2 episodes
1980	The Timeless Land	Governor King	TV movie
1981	Bellamy	Jack	1 episode
1981	Outbreak of Love		Miniseries
1981; 1986	Prisoner (aka Prisoner: Cell Block H)	Harry Bassinger / James Marne	8 episodes
1983; 1984	Runaway Island	Rev Symes	2 episodes
1984	Boy in the Bush	Mr George	Miniseries, 4 episodes
1984	Conferenceville		TV movie
1984	Special Squad	Whiteman	1 episode
1984	Carson's Law	Judge	3 episodes
1985–1986	The Flying Doctors	Dr Frank Turner	24 episodes
1986	Whose Baby?	Administrator	Miniseries, 1 episode
1990	Neighbours	Derek Wilcox	8 episodes
1991	Brides of Christ	Bishop	Miniseries, 2 episodes
1992	Boys from the Bush	Alec	1 episode
1992	Round the Twist	Inspector Ghost	1 episode

== Theatre ==
Year	Title	Role	Notes
1955	Twelfth Night	Malvolio	Australian regional tour with Union Theatre Repertory Company
1955	Meda	Soldier's attendant on Creon and Aegeus	Comedy Theatre, Melbourne
1955	The Time of Your Life		University of Melbourne with Union Theatre Repertory Company
1956	The Yeomen of the Guard	Actor / singer	Theatre Royal, Adelaide with J. C. Williamson's & Gilbert and Sullivan Opera Company
1958	Cox and Box / H.M.S. Pinafore		Theatre Royal, Adelaide with J. C. Williamson's & Gilbert and Sullivan Opera Company
1958	The Gondoliers	Annibale	Theatre Royal, Adelaide with Gilbert and Sullivan Opera Company
1958	Hotel Paradiso	Cot	University of Melbourne with Union Theatre Repertory Company
1958	The Knight of the Burning Pestle	Venturwell	University of Melbourne with Union Theatre Repertory Company
1958	Blood Wedding	The bride's father	University of Melbourne with Union Theatre Repertory Company
1958	The Threepenny Opera	John Brown	University of Melbourne with Union Theatre Repertory Company
1958	Lysistrata		University of Melbourne with Union Theatre Repertory Company
1959	Look Back in Anger		University of Melbourne, Victorian regional tour
1959	The Merchant of Venice	Duke of Venice	Theatre Royal, Adelaide, His Majesty's Theatre, Perth, Theatre Royal Sydney with J. C. Williamson's
1959	King Lear	Duke of Cornwall	Theatre Royal, Adelaide, His Majesty's Theatre, Perth, Theatre Royal Sydney with J. C. Williamson's
1959	A Midsummer Night's Dream		Theatre Royal, Adelaide with J. C. Williamson's
1959	The Winter's Tale	Old Shepherd	Theatre Royal, Adelaide, His Majesty's Theatre, Perth, Theatre Royal Sydney with J. C. Williamson's
1959–1960	The Belle of New York		Bristol Hippodrome, UK
1963	When the Gravediggers Come		Emerald Hill Theatre, Melbourne
1963	Who'll Come A-Waltzing?		Comedy Theatre, Melbourne with J. C. Williamson's & St Martin’s Theatre Company
1963	Goodnight Mrs. Puffin	Stephen Parker	Comedy Theatre, Melbourne with J. C. Williamson's
1968	Bell, Book and Candle		St Martins Theatre, Melbourne
1968	Staircase	Harry C. Leeds	St Martins Theatre, Melbourne
1968	Period of Adjustment		St Martins Theatre, Melbourne
1968	Mame	Actor / singer	Her Majesty's Theatre, Melbourne, Her Majesty's Theatre, Adelaide with J. C. Williamson's
1969	Hadrian VII		Her Majesty's Theatre, Melbourne with J. C. Williamson's
1969	Out of the Crocodile		St Martins Theatre, Melbourne
1969	This Story of Yours	Baxter	St Martins Theatre, Melbourne
1971	Caroline	Dr John Lang	St Martins Theatre, Melbourne, Playhouse, Canberra
1972	The Wakefield Plays		Hobart City Hall
1972	Horrie's Alibi		Flinders University, Adelaide
1974	The Signalman's Apprentice		Monash University, Melbourne with The Alexander Theatre Company
1975	The Freeway		Russell St Theatre, Melbourne with MTC
1966	The Season at Sarsaparilla	Mr Erbage	Sydney Opera House with Old Tote Theatre
1977	Caesar and Cleopatra	Pothinus	Sydney Opera House with Old Tote Theatre
1978–1979	The Kingfisher	Standby	Comedy Theatre, Melbourne, Seymour Centre, Sydney
1979	Life of Galileo	Cardinal Bellarmine / Mr Gaffone	Nimrod Theatre, Sydney
1979	The Venetian Twins	The Judge	Sydney Opera House with STC & Nimrod Theatre Company
1980	The Sunny South		Sydney Opera House with STC
1980	What the Butler Saw	Dr Rance	Playhouse, Adelaide with STCSA
1981	Lulu	Goll / Others	Playhouse, Adelaide, Sydney Opera House with STCSA
1982	You Can't Take It With You		Sydney Opera House with STC
1982	Night and Day	Geoffrey Carson	Marian St Theatre, Sydney, Canberra Theatre
1984	The Lady from the Sea	Dr. Wangel	Playhouse, Adelaide with STCSA
1984	Romeo and Juliet		Playhouse, Adelaide with STCSA
1984	The Time Is Not Yet Ripe	Sir Joseph Quiverton	Playhouse, Adelaide with STCSA
1985	Heartbreak House		Sydney Opera House with STC
1991	Uncle Vanya	Telegin	Russell St Theatre, Melbourne with MTC
1992	A Month of Sundays	Aylott	Russell St Theatre, Melbourne with MTC
1993	Shadowlands	Warnie Lewis	Playhouse, Melbourne
