= The Humpty Dumpty Man =

- Directed by: P. J. Hogan
- Written by: P. J. Hogan; Karl Zwicky
- Produced by: Miranda Bain
- Starring: Frank Gallacher; Rod Mullinar; Fred Parslow
- Cinematography: Martin McGrath
- Edited by: Murray Ferguson
- Production companies: Quantum Films; Capital Productions; Australian Film Commission
- Distributed by: Home Cinema Group (video)
- Release date: 1989 (video)
- Running time: 92 minutes
- Country: Australia
- Language: English
- Budget: A$1,292,000

The Humpty Dumpty Man is a 1986 Australian TV film which was the first feature co-written and directed by P.J. Hogan. It was based on the ALP politician David Combe affair.

Shadlow is a trade consultant who accepts a Soviet trade contract and is accused of international espionage.

The movie was not released theatrically.

== Cast ==
- Frank Gallacher as Gerry Shadlow
- Rod Mullinar as Stewart Brax
- Fred Parslow as Symes
- John Frawley as Gordon Morris
- Deborra-Lee Furness as Carmel De Vries
- Frankie J. Holden as Noel Calderwood
- Sue Jones as Adele Shadlow
- Kim Gyngell as Tape Operator
