= Kim Gyngell =

Australian comedian and actor (born 1952)

- Born: 1952 (age 73–74); Melbourne, Victoria, Australia
- Other name: Kym Gyngell
- Occupations: Actor, musician
- Years active: 1974–present
- Children: 4
- Relatives: Skye Gyngell (second cousin); David Gyngell (second cousin)

Kim Gyngell (born 1952), sometimes also credited as Kym Gyngell, is an Australian comedian and film, television and stage actor. Gyngell won the Australian Film Institute Award for Best Actor in a Supporting Role in 1988 for his role as Ian McKenzie in Boulevard of Broken Dreams.

== Early life and education ==
Kim Gyngell was born in Melbourne, Victoria.

He had not considered a career in acting until his high school English teacher suggested it to him, and he soon went for an audition. He said that he was not a very good student at school.

== Career ==
=== Television ===
In the late 1980s and early 1990s, Gyngell appeared in The Comedy Company and developed several popular characters, one of whom, Col'n Carpenter, went on to have his own sitcom of the same name. Gyngell also appeared (as Carpenter) in a series of public service announcements for the Alcohol Advisory Council of New Zealand.

Gyngell was a regular on Australian comedy series Full Frontal during the mid-1990s, where he starred alongside Eric Bana before Bana attained Hollywood fame. His most notable characters included; 'Leon' (an art critic who used to frequently utter the word 'crap'); and as characters sending up Kerry O'Brien and John Laws. After Full Frontal, Gyngell had guest roles, in comedy programs The Micallef Program and Pizza, and on drama series’ The Secret Life of Us, CrashBurn, Love My Way and Underbelly.

From 2007, Gyngell played Father Harris in the comedy The Librarians. In 2008, he featured in the comedy series Very Small Business. In 2012, Gyngell played Paddy the accountant in The Straits. More recently he has starred in Top of the Lake, Rake, a second season of Very Small Business, Love Me, Crazy Fun Park, Black Snow (featuring Travis Fimmel), Wakefield, No Activity, and The Artful Dodger.

=== Film ===
In 1985, Gyngell starred in Wills & Burke playing William John Wills. In 1988, his role in Boulevard of Broken Dreams, earned him an AFI award for Best Actor. Likewise, his 1990 star turn in Heaven Tonight earned him an AFI nomination. In 2000, he starred in the surprise comedy hit of the year, The Wog Boy. Post-2000, he featured in The Hard Word, Macbeth and Salvation. More recent film appearances include The Little Death and Brothers' Nest.

=== Theatre ===
Gyngell played with various theatre collectives in the 1970s, such as La Mama, The Pram Factory, Hoopla (the predecessor of the Malthouse Theatre, Melbourne) and the Sydney Theatre Company. In 2003, he played Robert in a production of David Auburn's play Proof. In 2008 Gyngell starred in Joanna Murray-Smith Ninety and Molière's The Hypocrite at the Melbourne Theatre Company. In 2012, he performed in Sydney Theatre Company's production of Pygmalion.

== Personal life ==
Gyngell has been married twice, and has an adult daughter from his first marriage. He later married Melinda Butel, and has three sons with her, the first of whom was born when he was around 57 years old.

== Filmography ==
=== Television ===
| Year | Title | Role | Type |
|---|---|---|---|
| 1974 | Division 4 | Rabbit | TV series, 1 episode |
| 1974 | Homicide | Greg / Kenny | TV series, 1 episode |
| 1974-75 | Matlock Police | Sam / Alf Moore / Moses Lane / Clarry Adams | TV series, 4 episodes |
| 1978-81 | Cop Shop | Oswald Prowse / Cliff Scully / George Edmunds / Lenny Wilson / Steve Ricketts | TV series, 7 episodes |
| 1980 | The Sullivans | Reporter | TV series, 1 episode |
| 1983 | The Daryl Somers Show | Undertaker in ‘Detergent Place’ | TV series, 1 episode |
| 1985 | The Eleventh Hour | Various characters (including Col’n Carpenter) | TV series |
| 1985 | The Dunera Boys | Private Bruce | Miniseries, 2 episodes |
| 1986 | Kaboodle | Magic Mirror | TV series, Episode: Snow White and the Dreadful Dwarves (Season 1) |
| 1986 | The Fast Lane | Lynch | TV series, 1 episode |
| 1987 | The Petrov Affair | Harry Pitt | Miniseries, 2 episodes |
| 1987 | The Flying Doctors | Dan Divine | TV series, 1 episode |
| 1988-89 | The Comedy Company | Colin Carpenter | TV series |
| 1990-91 | Col'n Carpenter | Colin Carpenter | TV series, 61 episodes |
| 1992 | All Together Now | Louie Little | TV series, 1 episode |
| 1992 | Bligh | The Prince | TV series, 1 episode |
| 1992 | Embassy | Richardson | TV series, 1 episode |
| 1993-97 | Full Frontal | Various characters | TV series, 107 episodes |
| 1993 | Seven Deadly Sins | William | Miniseries, Episode: Greed |
| 1994 | Wedlocked | Harold | TV series, 2 episodes |
| 1995 | Fire | Jimmy Runyon | TV series, 5 episodes |
| 1999 | The Micallef Program | Various Characters | TV series, 1 episode |
| 1999 | Chuck Finn | Mr Jones | TV series, 1 episode |
| 2000 | Blue Heelers | Shane Donnelly | TV series, 1 episode |
| 2000 | The Games | Alan Ronaldson | TV series, 1 episode |
| 2000 | SeaChange | Dennis Dreeble | TV series, 1 episode |
| 2000 | Eugenie Sandler P.I. | Dancer | TV series, 1 episode |
| 2001 | Pizza | Bank Manager | TV series, 1 episode |
| 2001-02 | BackBerner | Self | TV series, 10 episodes |
| 2003 | Welcher & Welcher | Opening Narration | Miniseries, 1 episode |
| 2003 | CrashBurn | Wally | TV series, 1 episode |
| 2003 | The Secret Life of Us | Dr. Vander | TV series, 7 episodes |
| 2005 | Scooter: Secret Agent | Cole Bunker | TV series, 1 episode |
| 2006 | Nightmares and Dreamscapes: From the Stories of Stephen King | Will Tabor, Literary Agent | Miniseries, 1 episode |
| 2007 | City Homicide | Adam Boldt | TV series, 1 episode |
| 2007 | Love My Way | Curtis Manning | TV series, 3 episodes |
| 2007 | Wilfred | Dr. Jack Underwood | TV series, 3 episodes |
| 2007 | The Librarians | Father Harris | TV series, 12 episodes |
| 2008 | Underbelly | Keith Faure (‘Mr X’) | TV series, 1 episode |
| 2008 | Very Small Business | Ray Leonard | TV series, 6 episodes |
| 2010 | Lowdown | Howard Evans | TV series, 16 episodes |
| 2012 | The Straits | Paddy | TV series, 2 episodes |
| 2013 | Upper Middle Bogan | Mr Widdicombe | TV series, 1 episode |
| 2015 | Hiding | Warwick Darmody | TV series, 8 episodes |
| 2016 | Rake | Reggie | TV series, 1 episode |
| 2016 | No Activity | Rainer | TV series, 1 episode |
| 2016 | Jack Irish | Warren Tissot | TV series, 3 episodes |
| 2017 | Top of the Lake | Bootie | TV series, 4 episodes |
| 2017 | Sunshine | Rev. Neil ‘The Peacock’ Skelton | Miniseries, 4 episodes |
| 2018 | Picnic at Hanging Rock | Charlie Seymour-Baker | Miniseries, 1 episode |
| 2018 | Back in Very Small Business | Ray Leonard | TV series, 8 episodes |
| 2021 | Wakefield | Zelco | Miniseries, 2 episodes |
| 2021-23 | Love Me | Richard | Miniseries, 4 episodes |
| 2022-23 | Black Snow | Sergeant Troy Turner | TV series, 6 episodes |
| 2023 | Crazy Funpark | Edmund Henley | TV series, 3 episodes |
| 2023–present | The Artful Dodger | Professor Alistair McGregor | TV series |

=== Film ===
| Year | Title | Role | Type |
|---|---|---|---|
| 1980 | The Chain Reaction | Crabs | Feature film |
| 1985 | Wills & Burke | William John Wills | Feature film |
| 1986 | Just Us | The Mouth | TV film |
| 1987 | Ground Zero | Detective | Feature film |
| 1987 | With Love to the Person Next to Me | Wallace | Feature film |
| 1987 | Bushfire Moon | Hungry Bill | Feature film |
| 1988 | Backstage | Paarvo | Feature film |
| 1988 | Evil Angels (A Cry in the Dark) | Feature film | |
| 1988 | Boulevard of Broken Dreams | Ian McKenzie | Feature film |
| 1988 | Bachelor Girl | Karl Stanton | TV film |
| 1988 | Grievous Bodily Harm | Mick | Feature film |
| 1989 | The Humpty Dumpty Man | Tape Operator | Feature film |
| 1990 | What the Moon Saw | Jim Shilling | Feature film |
| 1990 | Heaven Tonight | Baz Schultz | Feature film |
| 1993 | The Making of Nothing | Davo | TV film |
| 1996 | Love and Other Catastrophes | Professor Leech | Feature film |
| 1996 | Shaun Micallef’s World Around Him | Various characters | TV film |
| 1997 | Kangaroo Palace | Spider | TV movie |
| 1997 | Amy | Wax Stevens | Feature film |
| 2000 | Arctic Adventure | Tek (voice) | Short film |
| 2000 | The Wog Boy | Supervisor | Feature film |
| 2002 | The Hard Word | Paul | Feature film |
| 2002 | Blow | Richard | Short film |
| 2003 | Roundabout | Dr Patrick O’Roarke | Short film |
| 2003 | The House of Names | Eleanor | Short film |
| 2004 | Josh Jarman | Stan Billows | Feature film |
| 2005 | The Writer | Jonathan | Short film |
| 2006 | Macbeth | Doctor | Feature film |
| 2007 | The Lone Rider | Lone Rider | Short film |
| 2008 | Salvation | Tony | Feature film |
| 2014 | The Little Death | Steve | Feature film |
| 2015 | Force of Destiny | Dr James | Feature film |
| 2017 | Bleeding Steel | Dr. James | Feature film |
| 2018 | Brothers' Nest | Rodger | Feature film |

== Theatre ==
| Year | Title | Role | Company/Venue |
|---|---|---|---|
| 1971 | The Day the Whores Come to Play Tennis | | New Theatre, Sydney, Pram Factory |
| 1972 | You’ll Come to Love Your Sperm Test | | |
| 1972 | Driftwood | | Claremont Theatre |
| 1973 | The One Day of the Year | | Alexander Theatre |
| 1973 | Oedipus Rex | Oedipus | Claremont Theatre |
| 1974 | Waves | | Claremont Theatre |
| 1974 | The Bald Prima Donna | | Claremont Theatre |
| 1974 | Theatre in Education | | Arena Theatre Company tour |
| 1976 | Obsessive Behaviour in Small Spaces | | La Mama Theatre |
| 1977 | Dr Faustus | | Sydney Town Hall with Performance Syndicate |
| 1978 | Freaks | Maggott | Playbox Theatre, Melbourne |
| 1978 | The Ship's Whistle | | Pram Factory with Australian Performance Group |
| 1979 | The Caucasian Chalk Circle | Ironshirt | Sydney Opera House with Sydney Theatre Company |
| 1979–81 | Boys Own McBeth | | Paris Theatre, Sydney, Comedy Theatre, Melbourne, Canberra Theatre, Hobart, Regal Theatre, Perth, Thebarton Theatre, Adelaide, Opera Theatre, Adelaide, Westwood Theatre LA |
| 1985 | Nine Little Australians! (Season Two) | | YMCA, Melbourne |
| 1992 | A Dickins' Christmas | Jack Gruel | Malthouse Theatre with Playbox Theatre, Melbourne |
| 1993 | Much Ado About Nothing | Dogberry | Playhouse, Melbourne, Theatre Royal, Hobart, Princess Theatre, Launceston with Melbourne Theatre Company |
| 1994 | Cosi | Doug | Glen Street Theatre, Playhouse, Canberra, Geelong Arts Centre, The Capital, Bendigo, Monash University, West Gippsland Arts Centre, Russell Street Theatre with Melbourne Theatre Company |
| 1996–98 | Sylvia | Tom / Phyllis / Leslie | Wharf 1 Theatre with Sydney Theatre Company, Fairfax Studio with Melbourne Theatre Company |
| 1997 | The Real Inspector Hound | Moon | Playhouse, Melbourne with Melbourne Theatre Company |
| 1998 | Twelfth Night | Malvolio | Playhouse, Melbourne with Melbourne Theatre Company |
| 1998 | The Misanthrope | The Critic | Fairfax Studio with Melbourne Theatre Company |
| 1999 | Pride and Prejudice | Mr Collins | Sydney Opera House, Playhouse, Melbourne with Melbourne Theatre Company |
| 2000 | Art and Soul | Artist (Untitled); Rembrandt (The Slaughterhouse); Zod (Whispering Death) | Fairfax Studio with Melbourne Theatre Company |
| 2001 | Art | Yvan | Playhouse, Melbourne, Regal Theatre, Perth, QPAC with Melbourne Theatre Company |
| 2002 | Blue/Orange | Robert | Fairfax Studio with Melbourne Theatre Company |
| 2002 | The Simple Truth | Hirst | Malthouse Theatre |
| 2003 | The Visit | The Teacher | Playhouse, Melbourne with Melbourne Theatre Company |
| 2003 | Proof | Robert | Cremorne Theatre with Queensland Theatre |
| 2004 | Hinterland | Frank Gruel | Fairfax Studio with Melbourne Theatre Company |
| 2004 | Cruel and Tender | Richard | Fairfax Studio with Melbourne Theatre Company |
| 2005 | Guantanamo: Honor Bound to Defend Freedom | | Fortyfivedownstairs |
| 2005 | The Metamorphosis | Gregor's boss / Harry the cleaner | Wharf 2 Theatre, Malthouse Theatre with Sydney Theatre Company |
| 2006 | Ray's Tempest | Duffy | Fairfax Studio with Melbourne Theatre Company |
| 2006 | Festen | Paul | Fairfax Studio with Melbourne Theatre Company |
| 2006 | It Just Stopped | Franklin | Belvoir Street Theatre |
| 2007 | The Glory | | Fairfax Studio, Melbourne |
| 2007 | The Pillowman | Tupolski | Malthouse Theatre with Melbourne Theatre Company |
| 2007-09 | Ninety | William | Fairfax Studio, Melbourne, Geelong Arts Centre, Cremorne Theatre with Melbourne Theatre Company for Queensland Theatre |
| 2008–09 | The Hypocrite | Tartuffe | Playhouse, Melbourne with Melbourne Theatre Company |
| 2010 | The Ugly One | Scheffler | Southbank Theatre with Melbourne Theatre Company |
| 2010 | God of Carnage | Alan Reille | Dunstan Playhouse Adelaide, Hopgood Theatre, Noarlunga Centre with State Theatre Company of South Australia |
| 2011 | The Laramie Project - Ten Years Later | Dennis Shepard | Red Stitch Actors Theatre |
| 2011 | Return to Earth | Cleveland Waster | Fairfax Studio with Melbourne Theatre Company |
| 2012 | Pygmalion | Colonel Pickering | Sydney Theatre Company |
| 2013 | A Number | Salter | Studio Underground, State Theatre Centre with Perth Theatre Company |
| 2013 | The Dragon | The Mayor | Malthouse Theatre |
| 2017 | Hay Fever | David Bliss | Southbank Theatre with Melbourne Theatre Company |

== Music ==
Gyngell played keyboards in the Melbourne band Le Club Foote, who released their only album Cinema Qua in 1984, along with a couple of singles. The album was produced by Colin Hay of the band Men at Work.

=== Albums ===
| Year | Title | Album details |
|---|---|---|
| 1984 | Cinema Qua | Format: LP, CD; Label: EMX (430010) |

=== Singles ===
List of singles, with Australian chart positions
| Year | Title | Peak chart positions | Album |
| Year | Title | AUS | Album |
|---|---|---|---|
| 1984 | "Party"/"Happy" | 56 | Cinema Qua |
| 1984 | "Warning"/"Life in Ice" | - | Cinema Qua |

== Awards ==
| Year | Award | Nominated work | Category | Result | Ref. |
|---|---|---|---|---|---|
| 1988 | AFI award | Boulevard of Broken Dreams | Best Actor in a Supporting Role | Won | |
| 1989 | AFI award | Heaven Tonight | Best Actor in a Supporting Role | Nominated | |
| 2005 | St Kilda Film Festival | The Writer | Best Actor Award | Nominated | |
