= Salvation (2008 film) =

- Directed by: Paul Cox
- Written by: Paul Cox
- Produced by: Paul Cox; Tony Llewellyn-Jones
- Starring: Wendy Hughes; Bruce Myles
- Edited by: Aden Young
- Release date: 12 October 2008 (Warsaw International FilmFest)
- Country: Australia
- Language: English
- Box office: $3,182

Salvation is a 2008 Australian film directed by Paul Cox and starring Wendy Hughes and Bruce Myles.

Cox was inspired to make the film after seeing a televangelist on TV late at night asking for money for a facelift.

== Cast ==
- Wendy Hughes as Gloria
- Natalia Novikova as Irina
- Bruce Myles as Barry
- Kim Gyngell as Tony
- Alex Menglet as Anton
- Barry Humphries as Client
- Chris Haywood as Architect
- Tony Llewellyn-Jones as Derek Zoloff
- Deidre Rubenstein as Gloria's Coach
- Terry Norris as Gallery Guide
- Charles ‘Bud’ Tingwell as Gallery Visitor
- Monica Maughan as Gallery Visitor
- Loene Carmen as Singer
- Aden Young as Gloria's Acolyte

== Reception ==
The film received mixed reviews.
