= Frank Howson =

Australian filmmaker (1952–2024)

- Born: Frank Michael Howson; 10 March 1952; Melbourne, Victoria, Australia
- Died: 9 February 2024 (aged 71)
- Other name: Frankie Howson
- Occupations: Director; screenwriter; singer; producer; songwriter; poet
- Years active: 1959–2024
- Spouse(s): Lisa Waters (m. fl. 1976; div. 19??); Lynn Murphy (m. 19??; div. fl. 1997) Terri Leslie Garber (m. 2001; div. 2002)
- Children: 1

Frank Michael Howson (10 March 1952 – 10 February 2024) was an Australian theatre and film director, screenwriter, and singer. He directed Flynn (1996) on the early life of Errol Flynn and Hunting (1991). Howson, with Peter Boyle, helped establish Boulevard Films which produced thirteen films from Boulevard of Broken Dreams (1988) to Flynn; besides producing for Boulevard Films, Howson often wrote scripts and directed.

== Early years ==
Frank Michael Howson was born in Melbourne on 10 March 1952. He started in show business when he was seven. After leaving school, Christian Brothers College, St. Kilda (1963–1967), Howson's first job was with Melbourne radio station 3UZ as office boy. Eventually promoted to panel operator, he worked on John McMahon's popular weekly show Radio Auditions (see 3UZ). Whenever not enough acts showed up, young Frank was summoned to perform under made up names. During this period Howson was nicknamed 'Magical Frank' when asked to perform on a pilot for a TV talent show by 3UZ's Jimmy Hannan.

=== Recording artist ===
DJ Stan Rofe signed Howson to a recording deal and produced his first single: "Seventeen Ain't Young" (written by Jeff Barry) / Hide and seek (Richie Adams, Mark Barkan) performed by "Frankie Howson" (1969) who was seventeen during recording, it became a Top 40 hit in Melbourne.

Howson released two other singles This Night (Howson, Kenneth Firth, Miller) and 1983 The Heart Is A Lonely Hunter (John Capek, Howson).

=== Music publisher ===
Howson was manager of the Australian branch of German-based I.C. Records to publish musical works (including his own) distributed by EMI. He co-wrote John Paul Young's 1984 album One Foot in Front. He signed New romantic band Pseudo Echo and co-wrote their songs Autumnal Park and Destination Unknown with Tony Lugton, they later had a 1987 No. 1 hit in Australia with their version of Funky Town. I.C. Records scored 3 national hits in Australia in its first 12 months of operation. Howson and Peter Boyle were Executive Producers for John Paul Young's 1983 hit Soldier of Fortune (John Capek, Marc Jordan) reaching No. 15.

Howson and Allan Zavod wrote Time Can't Keep Us Apart which won the 1987 Asian Popular Song contest performed by Kate Ceberano to an estimated TV audience of 500 million.

=== Theatre works ===
Frank Howson began his career as stage actor, singer and dancer, and appeared in 21 major productions (including the Australian production of Oliver!) before turning 21. In the early 1970s, Howson met fellow actor Barry Ferrier while they were both appearing in the original Australian production of Jesus Christ Superstar, and the two men subsequently collaborated on a number of theatre-related projects. The first of these was a children's musical entitled The Faraway Land of Magical Frank, which was produced at the Toral Theatre in Melbourne in January 1976. Later that year, Howson and Ferrier released a concept recording of a follow-up children's musical, entitled The Boy who dared to dream, performed by Trevor White, pop singer Mark Holden and actors John Waters and Tommy Dysart. The first staged production of the show (featuring some of the actors from the concept recording) was mounted in Melbourne in January 1978, with a second production in May 1981.

Frank Howson went on to create two more children's musicals, without Ferrier's involvement: Aladdin and his Wonderful Lamp (music by Robert Gavin, 1981) and Sinbad the Sailor: The Last Adventure (music by Ian McKean, 1982). Both were initially staged at the Alexander Theatre at Monash University.

== Filmmaking ==
Boulevard Films was a production company on Errol St, North Melbourne.

Boulevard's notable productions include:

- 1988 Boulevard of Broken Dreams (Howson screenwriter, cameo) won two AFI Awards: John Waters "Best Actor" and Kym Gyngell "Best Supporting"; nominated for five others including "Best Picture". Its soundtrack (with nine Howson co-compositions) was nominated for an ARIA Award for Best Soundtrack Album of the Year.
- 1989 'Heaven Tonight' (Howson co-wrote the screenplay as well as songs for this film. It was nominated for an AFI Award. It starred John Waters, Kim Gyngell, Rebecca Gilling, Guy Pearce and Sean Scully.
- 1990 Friday on My Mind with Guy Pearce
- 1990 What the Moon Saw (Howson screenwriter, cameo) won an AFI Award for Rose Chong "Best Costume Design". It revolves around a child absorbed with the story of Sinbad.
- 1991 Hunting starred John Savage, Kerry Armstrong (nominated for AFI Best Actress) and Guy Pearce; Howson wrote and directed.
- 1996 Flynn starred Pearce, Steven Berkoff, Claudia Karvan and Savage; Howson directed and co-wrote. Problems occurred while making this film with Boulevard Films collapsing acrimoniously.

Some Boulevard Films listed at Internet Movie Database did not have a general release, e.g. The Final Stage (1995) had its 'World Premiere' ten years later at Melbourne Underground Film Festival 2005.

Howson moved to Hollywood in 1997 after a falling out with his business partner and the collapse of Boulevard Films.

== Personal life and death ==
Howson was married three times:

1. Lisa Waters (fl. 1976)
2. Lynn Murphy (1983–1999) Their son, Oliver Howson was born in 1991.
3. Terri Garber (2001–2002)

Howson was debilitated, at times, by Spasmodic Dysphonia which affected his voice; it was periodically mitigated by Botox injections into his larynx.

His gravelly voice can be heard in a 2005 radio interview with Paul Harris and Brett Cropley of 3RRR on Film Buffs' Forecast.

John Michael Howson is his cousin.

Howson died on 9 February 2024, at the age of 71.

== Subsequent career ==
=== Hollywood hiatus ===
Howson was on the Crystal Prix Jury for the 1997 Cannes Film Festival. From 1997 to 2005 Howson worked and lived in Hollywood. He served on the board of directors for the Starlight Children's Foundation of California.

Mr. Insincere, (written / performed by Howson) appears in the Disney movie Burn Hollywood Burn (1998), starring Eric Idle (as Alan Smithee) and Ryan O'Neal; with Whoopi Goldberg, Jackie Chan, Sylvester Stallone, and Robert Evans. Howson was asked by Steven Berkoff to direct the TV version of Berkoff's international hit theatre show Shakespeare's Villains (2002).

Howson later completed writing his memoirs on the film industry A Life in the Circus, and wrote songs for Steve Housden's (Little River Band lead guitarist) solo album.

=== MUFF & more ===
Richard Wolstencroft formed MUFF in 2000 and appointed Howson as president of the jury. Boulevard Films' The Intruder (directed by Wolstencroft) and The Final Stage (directed by Howson) were both presented at the 2005 festival. The following year saw Howson's film Remembering Nigel tie with Penny by John King for MUFF's 2006 Best Short Film award. He acted and was a script editor in a Wolstencroft film, The Beautiful and Damned.

Howson later served as a board member of Open Channel, a non-profit organisation that supports young filmmakers. Howson was invited to direct the premiere production of the short play The Replacement Son for the Short and Sweet festival at Melbourne's Arts Centre in December 2007.

Some excerpts from Howson's film Flynn can be seen in documentary on the life of Errol Flynn, The Tasmanian Devil.

The new release book The Actors' Handbook by Marnie Hill, published by AT2, contains an interview with him.

Howson in 2012 and 2013 wrote and directed two sell-out seasons of the musical "Genesis To Broadway" at Chapel Off Chapel, Melbourne. Cast member Fem Belling was nominated for a Green Room Award for Best Performance in a Musical.

== Critical appraisal ==
According to a profile in Filmink Howson's films:

Explore recurring themes as much as any auteur: the culture clash between Australia and the US, the importance of artists remaining relevant, what constitutes selling out, the sacrifices to “make it” in show business, the struggles of middle-aged men, a love of theatre and music, the difficulty of maintaining a long-term romantic relationship, adoring shots of Melbourne (Howson could be perhaps the most Melbourne-philic film producer of them all).

== Filmography ==
Year	Title	Director	Producer	Writer	Actor	Notes
1967	Homicide	No	No	No	Yes	TV series. Role of Peter in Season 4, Episode 17, "The Catch."
1979	Skyways	No	No	No	Yes	TV series. Role of Steve Eagles in five episodes of Season 1.
1980	A Wild Ass of a Man	No	No	No	Yes	TV movie. Cameo as "Photographer"
1980	The Pirate Movie	No	No	No	Yes	Cameo as "Policeman"
1983	Prisoner	No	No	Yes	No	TV series. Writer of Episode 377 and 387.
1988	Backstage	No	No	Yes	No	
1988	Boulevard of Broken Dreams	No	Yes	Yes	Yes	Cameo as "Producer at Party"
1990	Heaven Tonight	No	Yes	Yes	No	
1990	Beyond My Reach	No	Yes	Yes	Yes	Cameo as "Man at Airport"
1990	What the Moon Saw	No	Yes	Yes	No	
1990	Friday On My Mind	Yes	No	Yes	No	Unfinished. A biopic of The Easybeats.
1991	Hunting	Yes	Yes	Yes	No	
1992	Come Rain or Shine	Yes	Yes	Yes	Yes	Unreleased
1992	A Slow Night at the Kuwaiti Cafe	No	Yes	No	No	Unreleased
1993	Flynn	Yes	Yes	Yes	Yes	Also released as My Forgotten Man. Cameo as "Opium Smoker"
1995	The Final Stage	Yes	Yes	Yes	Yes	Unreleased. Cameo as "Vision at Piano"
2005	The Intruder	No	Yes	Yes	No	Filmed in 1991. Finished, screened and released on DVD in 2005.
2006	Crimetime	No	Yes	No	No	Filmed in 1992, unfinished. Screened once in rough cut form at MUFF 2006
2009	The Beautiful and Damned	No	No	No	Yes	Also worked as script editor
2009	Remembering Nigel	Yes	No	Yes	Yes	Short film. Role of Nigel
2009	Crazy in the Night	No	No	No	Yes	Short film. Role of David
2017	The Second Coming, Vol. 2	No	No	No	Yes	Role of Frank Connolly
2018	A Thin Life	Yes	No	Yes	No	Short film. Filmed in the 1990s. Screened at MUFF 2018 and released by Howson on YouTube.
2022	The Debt Collector	No	No	No	Yes	Role of Father Jenkins
