= Harold Baigent =

New Zealand actor

- Born: 16 November 1916; Canterbury, New Zealand
- Died: 9 March 1996 (aged 79); Heathcote, Australia
- Occupation(s): Director, actor

Harold Verdun Baigent (16 November 1916 – 9 March 1996), known as 'Baige', was a New Zealand theatre director, actor and arts manager. He trained as an actor in the United States at Yale University Drama School, and acted in Broadway and London stage productions, before returning to New Zealand in the late 1940s, where he founded his own drama company and worked as a drama tutor and stage manager. In the 1960s, he settled in Melbourne, Australia. As director of the Emerald Hill Theatre Company and the Victorian Travelling Theatre, he was an influential figure in the Victorian theatrical scene, and played a significant role in promoting the arts in regional Victoria and South Australia. He was associated with the Warrandyte Arts Association Drama Group and performed in many productions including Twelfth Night (1964) as Malvolio, and as director of Salad Days (1968).

As an actor, Baigent was known for many parts on Australian film and television, including roles in the film Gallipoli and the television series The Flying Doctors, and a memorable introductory monologue at the beginning of the film Mad Max 2. He was director of the Council of Adult Education in Adelaide, South Australia for many years, and founded the Arts Train, an innovative travelling arts project that toured small towns throughout South Australia and Victoria. He retired to the Heathcote area in the 1980s, but continued to be actively involved in theatre and the arts there until his death in 1996.

== Partial filmography ==
=== Film ===
- Mad Dog Morgan (1976) as Extra #1
- Jacka V.C. (1978) as Himself
- Gallipoli (1981) as Camel Driver
- Mad Max 2 (1981) as The Feral Kid (older) / Narrator (voice)
- Double Deal (1983) as Sir Henry
- Niel Lynne (1985) as Guard
- Slate, Wyn & Me (1987) as Sammy
- Golden Braid (1990) as Clockmaker
- Garbo (1992) as Old Resident with Cat
- Plasmo (1997) as Librarian (voice) & Narrator

=== Television ===
- The Flying Doctors

== Stage ==
- Twelfth Night (1964) as Malvolio
- Salad Days (1968) as Director
