= CrashBurn =

- Genre: Soap opera Drama
- Created by: Deborah Cox; Andrew Knight
- Starring: Catherine McClements; Aaron Blabey; Sacha Horler; Liz Burch; Veronica Sywak; Richard Piper
- Country of origin: Australia
- Original language: English
- No. of seasons: 1
- No. of episodes: 13

Production
- Production locations: Melbourne, Victoria, Australia
- Production company: CoxKnight Productions

Original release
- Network: Network Ten
- Release: 18 August 2003

CrashBurn is an Australian 13-part drama series airing on Network Ten, about surviving long-term relationships in an age where multiple partners and multiple orgasms are considered a birthright.

It starred Catherine McClements and Aaron Blabey as Rosie and Ben Harfield, a couple whose marriage troubles send them to a counsellor. Most of the episodes are shown in two parts: half "He says" (Ben's view of the situation) and half "She says" (Rosie's view). Most of the episodes used flashbacks to an earlier part of the relationship when the trouble started.

Candice and Richard (played by Liz Burch and Richard Piper) are a couple also seeking counselling, who become involved in Rosie and Ben's lives. Numerous problems arise in the course of the series, not least Ben's affair with Rosie's best friend, Abby (Sacha Horler). Although the series was not a huge hit, it was noted for its fine performances, notably by Sacha Horler and Catherine McClements.

== Cast ==
=== Main / regular ===
- Catherine McClements as Rosie Denton Harfield
- Aaron Blabey as Ben Harfield
- Sacha Horler as Abby
- Liz Burch as Candice
- Veronica Sywak as Emily
- Richard Piper as Richard
- Grant Piro as Adam
- Bob Franklin as Theo
- Carmen Duncan as Anna Denton
- Wayne Hope as Phillip
- Christen O'Leary as Marianne
- Orpheus Pledger as Lewis Harfield
- Maria Theodorakis as Liv
- Simon Roborgh as Barman

=== Notable guests ===
- Adam Zwar as Tat
- Amanda Douge as Gina
- Andrea McEwan as Lucinda
- Bernard Curry as Glenn
- Brendan O'Connor as Garry
- Judi Farr as Marg
- Kat Stewart as Mandy
- Kym Gyngell as Wally, Abby's father
- Nicholas Bell as Clive
- Nicki Paull as Divorcee
- Pamela Rabe as Lawyer
- Terry Norris as Charlie
- Tim Robertson as John
- William McInnes as Colin
