= Raw Silk (film) =

- Directed by: Greg Dee
- Written by: Keith Aberdein
- Produced by: John Young
- Starring: David Argue; Nicki Paull; Colin Hay; Frank Gallacher
- Cinematography: Craig Young
- Production company: Television House
- Distributed by: Channel Nine
- Release date: 3 February 1989
- Running time: 95 mins
- Country: Australia
- Language: English

Raw Silk is a 1989 Australian film directed by Greg Dee. The plot concerns two barristers. It was a pilot for a TV series that did not eventuate and featured an early performance from Sophie Lee. It was a rare lead role for David Argue.

== Premise ==
A brilliant barrister, William Perry, defends himself against the charge of murdering a model. He is prosecuted by Kate Bradshaw, whose father, a judge, had his reputation tarnished by Perry and is looking for revenge.

== Cast ==
- David Argue as William Perry
- Nicki Paull as Kate Bradshaw
- Colin Hay as Parker
- Frank Gallacher as Johnson
- Sophie Lee as Josie
- Marion Edward as Judge 1
- Peter Hosking as Prosecutor

== Production ==
It was made by Johnny Young's production company, Television House (which had previously made the drama Matthew and Son. Young showed the rough cut of the pilot to Channel Nine. It was originally called Perry after the main character, barrister William Perry (David Argue). In 1988 Nine's programme director, Vicky Young, said the original cut of the film "was really off the wall. A lot of people were quite shocked by it because it was so radical; the character, the music, the script, the treatment were so different." However everyone liked the character of Perry, played by David Argue. Nine and Young worked on a new version of the story, added a female character and new scenes.

Colin Hay later recalled, ""What a funny little film that was. I loved working with David Argue, he made me laugh so much that boy".

The budget was $400,000. Tina Burstill was originally cast in the female lead.

The pilot was meant to screen in June 1988 but did not air until February 1989.

== Reception ==
The Sydney Morning Herald called it "a laidback if somewhat self conscious attempt at a black comedy that works more by default than design... a quirky and sporadically gray comedy which, for all its faults, almost overcomes triteness to limp home on vitality."
