= Backstage (1988 film) =

- VHS cover for Latin American release
- Directed by: Jonathan Hardy
- Written by: Jonathan Hardy; Frank Howson; John D. Lamond
- Produced by: Peter Boyle; Geoff Burrowes
- Starring: Laura Branigan; Michael Aitkens; Noel Ferrier; Rowena Wallace
- Cinematography: Keith Wagstaff
- Edited by: Ray Daley
- Music by: Bruce Rowland
- Production company: Burrowes Film Group
- Release date: 30 March 1988 (Australia)
- Running time: 94 minutes
- Country: Australia
- Language: English
- Budget: A$7 million
- Box office: A$8,000 (Australia)

Backstage is a 1988 Australian film starring American singer Laura Branigan. The film was written and directed by Academy Award nominee Jonathan Hardy, who had also written Breaker Morant.

== Plot ==
The plot centred on American pop singer Kate Lawrence (Branigan) wanting to embark on a career as an actress. The only job she can find is playing the lead role in an Australian theatre production of The Green Year Passes. The hiring of an American causes conflict with her Australian cast and crew, and the chagrin of theatre critic Robert Landau with whom she has an affair.

== Production ==
In 1981 Frank Howson set up a company, Boulevard Films, with a view to making movies. He wanted to make a film on Les Darcy, Something Great, and collaborated with Jonathan Hardy on the script. They could not secure financing but Hardy showed Howson some other scripts he had written, including Backstage.

Backstage had was based on an idea by John Lamond and written by Jonathan Hardy and David Stevens. Lamond had meant to direct it in 1982 starring Max Phipps, Jill Perryman and Steve Tandy but the film did not eventuate.

Howson later said "There was much I liked about" the script for Backstage "and much I didn’t, and understood why Lamond hadn’t moved on it. It seemed to me to be very old fashioned. At that time the lead character was a soap star craving credibility. It was over-written, twee, and read like an Ealing Comedy without the laughs. There was no texture, no hint of darkness, no statement or meaning to it."

Howson and Hardy decided to work on Backstage together, with the story being relocated to the music world. Howson was impressed by Laura Branigan's acting in a segment for the video clip for her song "The Lucky One". He said "I suddenly got the idea that if the lead character of “Backstage” was changed to be a pop star wanting to be taken seriously as an actress and her only offer was from a producer in Australia, we had a film that would be modern, relevant, funny and say something meaningful about how we categorise and box artists in and restrict their growth."

Howson got Branigan interested in the lead, although she was offered a $250,000 fee which was "pay or play". The Burrowes Film Group needed to make another film before the end of the financial year and offered to raise the budget.

Frank Howson originally thought that the involvement of the Burrowes Film Group would be limited but found they wanted to have more creative control. "I knew very clearly what audience it should be made for", said Howson, "but all of a sudden I found myself dealing with production by committee. To even make the smallest decision required everyone sitting around the table."

Matters reached an impasse when Howson and Burrowes fought over who would compose the music. Burrowes fired Howson's composer, John Capek, and replaced him with Bruce Rowlands, then Burrowes bought Boulevard out of the film.

Filming started 7 March 1986.

== Release ==
The film was briefly released theatrically in Australia, before being released on home video internationally. Allmovie calls it an "insipid and cliché-ridden romantic comedy", although Variety conceded the film was "well crafted in every department". David Stratton called the film " neither funny nor romantic, and will do little for the careers of anyone involved in it." The film received bad reviews generally.

According to Filmink magazine it "could have been a fantastically fun film: it had a terrific support cast... an engaging lead... and an interesting, culturally relevant central theme (whether imported American stars are good or bad in Australian projects). But then they cast Laura Branigan, who can sing but can’t act, and got her to play a role where she acts and can’t sing."

Branigan also performed several songs in the film.

The funding of the film was investigated in an episode of ABC's Four Corners.

== Cast ==
- Laura Branigan as Kate Lawrence
- Michael Aitkens as Robert Landau
- Noel Ferrier as Mortimer Wynde
- Rowena Wallace as Evelyn Hough
- Kym Gyngell as Paarvo
- Mary Ward as Geraldine Woollencraft
- John Frawley
- Tommy Dysart as Head Waiter / Reception
- Jeremy Stanford as Bellboy
- Judith McGrath as Hotel Receptionist

== See also ==
- Cinema of Australia
