= Hunting (film) =

- DVD cover
- Directed by: Frank Howson
- Written by: Frank Howson
- Produced by: Frank Howson
- Starring: Kerry Armstrong; Guy Pearce; John Savage
- Production company: Boulevard Films
- Distributed by: Greater Union Organization
- Release date: 1991
- Country: Australia
- Language: English
- Budget: AU$5 million

Hunting is a 1991 Australian drama film written and directed by Frank Howson, starring John Savage, Kerry Armstrong (nominated for AFI Best Actress) and Guy Pearce.

== Plot ==
An American business tycoon, Michael Bergman, arrives in Melbourne and has an affair with Michelle, a married secretary, who works for the stockbroking firm of which he is a client. Michelle is drawn in by his rich and glamorous lifestyle and charismatic manner, but the more involved she gets, the more she realises how ruthless and morally bankrupt he is.

== Cast ==
- John Savage as Michael Bergman
- Kerry Armstrong as Michelle Harris
- Jeffrey Thomas as Larry Harris
- Guy Pearce as Sharp
- Rebecca Rigg as Debbie McCormick
- Rhys McConnochie as Bill Stockton
- Nicholas Bell as Piggott
- Gregory Apps as Julian Penn
- Jacek Koman as Bergman's Butler

== Production ==
Frank Howson says it was a requirement of the investors that he cast an American in the lead. Filming began in Melbourne in April 1989, with the movie being called "Australia's Wall Street (1987)".

Howson had made three films with Pino Amenta directing but wanted to direct Hunting himself.

== Reception ==
Filmink thought the movie had "a sensational performance by Kerry Armstrong" but was "totally undermined by the casting of John Savage, whose role should’ve been played by Guy Pearce."

== Soundtrack ==
As well as appearing in the film, Guy Pearce recorded a single called The Promise. The music video featured scenes from the film.
