= The Final Stage =

- Directed by: Frank Howson
- Written by: Frank Howson
- Produced by: Frank Howson executive: Peter Boyle
- Starring: Tommy Dysart; Abigail; Adrian Wright
- Production company: Boulevard Films
- Release date: 1995
- Running time: 73 minutes
- Country: Australia
- Language: English

The Final Stage is a film directed by Frank Howson.

== Cast ==
- Tommy Dysart as Stinky Radford
- Abigail as The Woman
- Adrian Wright

== Production ==
It was based on an early play by Howson and was the seventh film from Boulevard Films and the third which Howson directed. He shot it over two weeks with a cast of six actors on one set.

The movie has been called one of Howson's most personal works.

== Fraud Case ==
Howson later tried to pass the film off as another movie The Boy Who Dared to Dream in order to enable investors to achieve a tax deduction. This was unsuccessful and Howson was convicted of fraud.
