= Come Rain or Shine =

- Directed by: Frank Howson
- Written by: Frank Howson
- Produced by: Frank Howson; Peter Boyle (executive)
- Starring: Joan Brockenshire; Tommy Dysart; Frank Howarson
- Production company: Boulevard Films
- Release date: 1992
- Running time: 90 mins
- Country: Australia
- Language: English

Come Rain or Shine is a 1992 Australian film about a man, who becomes obsessed with a mysterious woman.

== Plot ==
A man must reassess his life when he becomes involved with an enigmatic woman.
