= Grievous Bodily Harm =

- DVD cover
- Directed by: Mark Joffe
- Written by: Warwick Hind
- Produced by: Richard Brennan
- Starring: Colin Friels; John Waters; Bruno Lawrence; Shane Briant
- Cinematography: Ellery Ryan
- Edited by: Marc van Buuren
- Music by: Chris Neal
- Release date: 1988
- Running time: 96 minutes
- Country: Australia
- Language: English
- Budget: AU $3.4 million
- Box office: $82,267 (Australia) $1 million (US sale)

Grievous Bodily Harm is a 1988 Australian crime film directed by Mark Joffe starring Colin Friels and John Waters.

== Plot ==
Crime reporter Tom Stewart (Colin Friels) and a cop (Bruno Lawrence) look for a deranged schoolteacher (John Waters) who goes on a murder spree while looking for the lover he thought to be dead.

== Cast ==
- John Waters as Morris Martin
- Colin Friels as Tom Stewart
- Bruno Lawrence as Det. Sgt. Ray Birch
- Kim Gyngell as Mick
- Gary Stalker as Derek Allen
- Joy Bell as Claudine
- Shane Briant as Stephen Enderby
- Caz Lederman as Vivian Enderby
- John Flaus as Neil Bradshaw
- Sandy Gore as Barbara Helmsley
- Deborah Kennedy as Madeleine Kovitch
- Marise Wipani as Suzie
- Kerry Armstrong as Annie
- Gary Waddell as Eddie Weaks

== Production ==
The script was written by Warwick Hind, a former executive at Greater Union. Errol Sullivan showed the script to Richard Brennan, who raised up to around a $1 million of the budget; the remainder was raised through Antony I. Ginnane. Richard Brennan says the actual cost of the film was $3 million but various fees put it up to $3.4 million.

== Awards ==
The film was nominated for 4 AFI Awards in 1988, including best picture.

== Box office ==
Grievous Bodily Harm grossed $82,267 at the box office in Australia. However it did sell to American company Fries Entertainment for over $1 million.

== See also ==
- Cinema of Australia
