= Burrowes Film Group =

Former Australian film production company

The Burrowes Film Group was a short lived Australian production company established in the wake of the success of The Man from Snowy River (1982) and Anzacs (1985). It was named after Geoff Burrowes. Other key personnel included John Dixon and George T. Miller.

In late 1985 they announced a $53 million package of several films over the next two years, including Cool Change, Free Enterprise (which became Running from the Guns), The Man from Snowy River 2, Clancy of the Overflow, Backstage, Future Tense (which became Dogs in Space) and Ground Zero. Of these only Clancy - with a proposed budget of $12 million - was not made.

For Dogs in Space and Ground Zero the company worked mainly to secure finance leaving creative decisions to others, in exchange for a fee.

However the majority of the movies were not financially successful and the company was soon wound up. The accounting practices of the group earned them a great deal of notoriety within the industry.

== Select credits ==
- Cool Change (1985)
- Dogs in Space (1986)
- Ground Zero (1987)
- Running from the Guns (1987)
- Backstage (1988)
- The Man from Snowy River II (1988)
- Minnamurra (1989)

=== Unmade films ===
- Clancy of the Overflow – a proposed $12 million film based on the poem which was to be shot in 1987
