= Crimetime (2006 film) =

1993 Australian film by Marc Gracie

- Directed by: Marc Gracie
- Written by: Bruce Venables
- Produced by: Frank Howson
- Starring: Marcus Graham; Lucy Bell; Bruce Venables; David Argue
- Production company: Boulevard Films
- Release date: 1993
- Running time: 96 minutes
- Country: Australia
- Language: English

Crimetime is an Australian film directed by Marc Gracie. It was the tenth movie of Boulevard Films and the first not written by Frank Howson (the writer was actor Bruce Venables, who also appeared in the cast). It was never completed due to the financial problems faced by Boulevard but was screened at the Melbourne Underground Film Festival in 2006 in rough cut form.

== Cast ==
- Marcus Graham
- Lucy Bell
- Bruce Venables
- David Argue
- Tiriel Mora as Ambo Officer

== Plot ==
Policemen Robin Decker and John Little begin to realise they are probably the only two honest cops on the force.
