= Ground Zero (1987 film) =

- Directed by: Bruce Myles; Michael Pattinson
- Written by: Mac Gudgeon; Jan Sardi
- Starring: Colin Friels; Jack Thompson; Donald Pleasence
- Music by: Chris Neal
- Production company: Burrowes Film Group
- Distributed by: Hoyts Distribution
- Release date: 1 October 1987
- Running time: 109 minutes
- Country: Australia
- Language: English
- Budget: A$7 million
- Box office: A$178,576 (Australia)

Ground Zero is a 1987 Australian action thriller film about a cinematographer who, prompted by curiosity about some old film footage taken by his father, embarks on a quest to find out the truth about British nuclear tests at Maralinga. It stars actors Colin Friels, Jack Thompson and Indigenous activist Burnum Burnum.

== Context of the film ==
In the 1950s, the British government had conducted a number of nuclear tests at a site called Maralinga in outback South Australia. It was subsequently demonstrated by medical evidence, witness statements and archive documents that during those tests, armed forces personnel and Indigenous Australians were exposed to nuclear fallout that affected their health and reduced their lifespan. This led eventually to a major inquiry, the McClelland Royal Commission, which reported in 1985. The inquiry attracted a lot of publicity, and ultimately a deal was struck with the United Kingdom to fund rehabilitation of the test sites.

Ground Zero was made immediately following this inquiry. While fictional, it explores the idea that the exposure to radiation of Indigenous people and army personnel may have been deliberate, or known about at the time and concealed. The political topicality of the film at the time of its release was reflected in the profile of some of the actors involved: Colin Friels has played a number of roles involving social activism, most notably years later in the Australian television miniseries Bastard Boys; Burnum Burnum was a long-time Indigenous rights activist; while Jack Thompson had previously played a leading role in another film sharply critical of the British military: Breaker Morant.

== Reception and legacy ==
Despite its success at the 1987 AFI Awards, reviews of the film were mixed. Pointing out that the film contained elements of both action thriller and political commentary, reviewers were unsure that it did either with great success. However, Janet Maslin, reviewing the film for the New York Times, wrote of "taut, clever conspiracy-theory thrillers, of which the new Australian film Ground Zero is a prime example".

It was shown on Indigenous television station Imparja 'as a tribute' to Burnum Burnum after his death in 1997.

== Cast ==
- Colin Friels as Harvey Denton
- Jack Thompson as Trebilcock
- Donald Pleasence as Prosper Gaffney
- Natalie Bate as Pat Denton
- Burnum Burnum as Yami Lester
- Simon Chilvers as Commission president
- Neil Fitzpatrick as Hooking
- Bob Maza as Walemari
- Beverley Dunn as Commissioner #1
- Alan Hopgood as Commissioner #2
- Peter Cummins as Ballantyne, Australian veteran
- Brian James as Vice-Admiral Windsor
- Bob Hornery as Meteorologist
- Steve Dodd as Freddy Tjapalijarri
- Alfred Austen as Aboriginal elder
- Tommy Dysart as British Veteran
- Mark Mitchell as Detective
- Janet Andrewartha as New neighbour
- Mike Bishop as TV News Cameraman

== Awards and nominations ==
Year	Award	Category	Result
1987	AFI Awards	Best Achievement in Cinematography	Won
1987	AFI Awards	Best Achievement in Editing	Won
1987	AFI Awards	Best Achievement in Production Design	Won
1987	AFI Awards	Best Achievement in Sound	Won
1987	AFI Awards	Best Actor	Nominated
1987	AFI Awards	Best Supporting Actor	Nominated
1987	AFI Awards	Best Director	Nominated
1987	AFI Awards	Best Film	Nominated
1987	AFI Awards	Best Original Screenplay	Nominated
1988	38th Berlin International Film Festival	Golden Berlin Bear	Nominated

== Production ==
Ground Zero was produced in 1986 and released in 1987. IMDb, and the DVD release of the film, both credit Michael Pattinson and Bruce Myles as producers, but only Pattinson is named in other sources. Pattinson went on to direct several other Australian feature films, including Wendy Cracked a Walnut (1990), Secrets (1992), and The Limbic Region (1997). Myles did not go on to other directing, but acted in numerous subsequent Australian films, including The Bank (2001).

Ground Zero was made for A$7 million, and filmed on location in Coober Pedy and Woomera in South Australia, as well as in Melbourne.

Sound for the film was created by a team including Roger Savage and Gary Wilkins, who had both worked on the Mad Max series of feature movies.

== Box office ==
Ground Zero grossed $178,576 at the box office in Australia.

== See also ==
- Cinema of Australia
