= Bushfire Moon =

- Directed by: George T. Miller
- Written by: Jeff Peck
- Starring: John Waters; Charles Tingwell; Bill Kerr; Dee Wallace
- Music by: Bruce Rowland
- Release date: 1987
- Country: Australia
- Language: English
- Budget: A$2 million
- Box office: A$493,871 (Australia)

Bushfire Moon is a 1987 Australian drama film about a young boy, Ned, who thinks a swagman is Santa Claus. It was released in the United States as The Christmas Visitor on the Disney Channel as a Disney Channel Premiere Film and as Miracle Down Under on VHS.

== Cast ==
- Dee Wallace as Elizabeth O'Day
- John Waters as Patrick O'Day
- Charles 'Bud' Tingwell as Max Bell
- William Kerr as Trevor Watson
- Grant Piro as Angus Watson
- Nadine Garner as Sarah O’Day
- Andrew Ferguson as Ned O'Day

== See also ==
- List of Christmas films
