= Flynn (film) =

1996 Australian film by Frank Howson

- Directed by: Frank Howson
- Written by: Frank Howson; Alister Webb
- Produced by: Frank Howson
- Starring: Guy Pearce; Steven Berkoff; Claudia Karvan; John Savage
- Music by: Anthony Marinelli; Billy Childs
- Production company: Boulevard Films
- Release date: 1996
- Running time: 95 minutes
- Country: Australia
- Language: English
- Budget: A$4.5 million

Flynn is an Australian film about the early life of Errol Flynn, focusing on his time in New Guinea starring Guy Pearce in the title role.

== Plot ==
A young Errol Flynn leaves Sydney and has various adventures in New Guinea. He returns to Australia and starts acting in movies.

== Original cast ==
- Guy Pearce as Errol Flynn
- Paul Cantoni aa Klaus Reicher
- Rebecca Rigg as Penelope Watts
- John Frawley as Headmaster
- Jan Friedl as Deidre Watt
- Sue Jones as Elsa Chauvel
- Tommy Dysart as Macintosh
- Tiriel Mora as Sydney Station Porter

== Final cast ==
- Guy Pearce as Errol Flynn
- Steven Berkoff as Klaus Reicher
- Claudia Karvan as Penelope Watts
- John Savage as Joe Stromberg
- Wendy Matthews as Nightclub Singer
- William Gluth as Professor Flynn
- Nicki Paull as Marelle Flynn
- Tim Hughes as James Dickson
- Adam May
- John Brumpton as Jarvis

== Production ==
=== Development ===
Frank Howson claimed he spent five years writing the script. "It was the hardest script I've ever written," he said. "He [Errol Flynn] was such an enigmatic figure."

Howson gave the lead role to Guy Pearce, with whom he had previously made two films. Pearce felt he did not look anything like Errol Flynn but his hair was cut and he wore brown contact lenses. "He was a very mixed up-person," Pearce said of Flynn. "Most of the things he did were out of desperation, trying to find himself. He was more like a kid who never grew up."

=== Original shoot ===
The movie was originally directed by Brian Kavanagh in 1989 on a budget of $3.5 million. Shooting took place in Melbourne, Cairns and New Guinea and was completed in September, despite the Cairns shoot being delayed by the 1989 Australian pilots' dispute.

=== Re-shoot ===
At the 1990 Cannes Film Festival, marketing group J and M became interested in distributing the film but thought it needed some re-shooting and some "name" stars. They provided a further $1 million for this to happen.

The film was then largely re-shot with Frank Howson stepping in as director, and some different support actors cast. Guy Pearce returned as Errol Flynn, but Rebecca Rigg, Jeff Truman and Paul Steven were replaced by Claudia Karvan, Steven Berkoff and John Savage. This caused trouble with Australia's Actors Equity because two Australian actors were replaced with foreign ones. New scenes were shot in Melbourne and Fiji, which stood in for New Guinea.

The Fijian unit was based out of Lase Lase, about 50 km from Nadi. No Fijian women would agree to go topless, so South African actress Sandi Schultz was imported to play the role of the chief's daughter. The Fijian men were reluctant to take their underwear off to play New Guinea natives. It was estimated about 40% of the film was reshot.

Frank Howson later said:

The original version of the film is literally unshowable. I had to sack the director and start again at great personal expense to me and my business partner. Remaking that film out of our own pockets, basically, put a huge financial pressure on our company. And ourselves for a few years and no doubt added tension that ultimately ruined our relationship, and then wound up the company. But, if I’d have released the original version I think it would’ve killed Guy Pearce’s blooming movie career that I was actively designing.

== Release ==
The movie was screened at the 1993 Cannes Film Festival under the title My Forgotten Man, by which time Howson said he had been working on it for 30 months. He blamed the stress of making it on the breakup of his marriage and business partnership. Howson:

It was like a game of Russian roulette. You actually wondered whether you would finish the film before you went broke. I now know what Coppola must have felt like on Apocalypse Now because in the end you just keep throwing money at this thing.

The film was set for release by Village Roadshow but Frank Howson became embroiled in a copyright dispute with his business partner; Roadshow withdrew the film from release seven days before it was scheduled to open. The movie was subsequently released on video and DVD several years later and sold widely around the world.

In 2002 Pearce described the film as the worst he had made.

Filmink said "the movie has Howson virtues (gorgeous pictures, skilled actors, interesting themes, love of show business) and flaws (scripting). Pearce takes all his chances and, for what it’s worth, the film is the best of the movies made about young Errol Flynn."

== Awards ==
Year	Nominee / work	Award	Result
1993	My Forgotten Man	AACTA Award; BASF Award for Best Original Music Score; Anthony Marinelli, Billy Childs	Nominated

== Notes ==
- Tulich, Katherine, "The Making and Re-Making of Flynn", Cinema Papers, May 1991
