= Boulevard of Broken Dreams (film) =

- DVD cover
- Directed by: Pino Amenta
- Written by: Frank Howson
- Produced by: Frank Howson
- Starring: John Waters; Penelope Stewart; Kim Gyngell; Andrew McFarlane; Kevin Miles
- Production company: Boulevard Films
- Distributed by: Hoyts
- Release date: 1988
- Country: Australia
- Language: English
- Budget: AU$2 million
- Box office: AU$126,359 (Australia)

Boulevard of Broken Dreams is a 1988 Australian film. It was the first movie produced by Boulevard Films.

== Plot ==
A successful Australian writer discovers that he has cancer and returns home to Melbourne to reconnect with his estranged wife and daughter.

== Cast ==
- John Waters as Tom Garfield
- Penelope Stewart as Helen Garfield
- Kim Gyngell as Ian McKenzie
- Andrew McFarlane as Jonathan Lovell
- Nicki Paull as Suzy Daniels
- Jacinta Stapleton as Jessie Garfield
- Kevin Miles as Geoff Bormann
- Ian McFadyen as Hotel Clerk
- Jeremy Kewley as Waiter

== Production ==
The film was inspired by the F. Scott Fitzgerald short story "Babylon Revisited".

Producer-writer Frank Howson met director Pino Amenta while discussing a potential mini-series about Les Darcy. Although that project never materialized, they decided to collaborate on Boulevard of Broken Dreams.

The original choice for the lead role was John Hargreaves, but when he became unavailable due to a scheduling conflict, Amenta suggested casting John Waters, who had recently worked with him on Nancy Wake.

Howson later reflected on the project: "It was the first film we'd done, and it was made with a lot of commercial requirements because we weren't in the position to just make a film and hope for the best. We set out to make a film that would do well here and internationally."

One of the significant changes during production was the ending. Originally, Waters' character was meant to board a plane to Los Angeles, with no one knowing he had returned home to die. However, in the final version of the film, the character is reunited with his wife and child.

Howson placed significant emphasis on the film's music:

We recorded a great deal of those songs in LA with people like Richie Havens, Dan Hill, and Marc Jordan. On most Australian productions, the soundtrack tends to be done last and usually at a stage when they have almost run out of money. It suffers as a result. To me, the soundtrack is one of the most important things for the emotional balance of a film.

== Soundtrack ==
The soundtrack album for Boulevard of Broken Dreams was released in 1988 through CBS. It earned songwriters Frank Howson, John Capek, Beeb Birtles, and David Schofield a nomination for the 1989 ARIA Award for Best Original Soundtrack, Cast or Show Album.

Track listing:

- "Boulevard of Broken Dreams" (Frank Howson/John Capek/Marc Jordan) – Marc Jordan
- "Breathless" (Howson/Capek) – Renée Geyer
- "Dreams" (Howson/Birtles) – Beeb Birtles
- "Under Fire" (Howson/Capek) – Marc Jordan
- "The Heart Is a Lonely Hunter" (Howson/Capek) – Stephen Cummings
- "We Had It All" (Dan Hill/Capek/Howson) – Dan Hill
- "Somewhere in the Night" (Howson/Capek) – Venetta Fields
- "True Love Ways" (Buddy Holly/Norman Petty) – Buddy Holly
- "I Could Have Been a Hero" (Howson/David Schofield) – Frank Howson
- "One Good Reason" (Howson/Capek) – Richie Havens
- "Tom Traubert's Blues" (Tom Waits) – Tom Waits

== Reception ==
John Waters earned an AFI Award for Best Actor for his performance in Boulevard of Broken Dreams. The film's popularity enabled Boulevard Films to secure funding for five additional movies. However, reviews were generally poor.

According to Filmink, "Melbourne has rarely looked more beautiful than in this movie, which has a fabulous cast and story full of potential... but is let down by its scripting."
