= Logie Awards of 1992 =

34th Logie Awards
- Date: 13 March 1992
- Site: Radisson President Hotel, Melbourne, Victoria
- Hosted by: Steve Vizard

Highlights
- Gold Logie: Jana Wendt
- Hall of Fame: Four Corners
- Most awards: Brides of Christ (5)
- Most nominations: E Street (5)

Television coverage
- Network: Seven Network

The 34th Annual TV Week Logie Awards were presented on 13 March 1992, in a ceremony hosted by Steve Vizard at the Radisson President Hotel in Melbourne. The ceremony was broadcast on the Seven Network. Guests included John Stamos, Dennis Waterman, Bob Hawke and Campbell McComas. Miniseries Brides of Christ received the most awards (5), including both Most Popular and Most Outstanding Telemovie or Miniseries. Soap opera E Street received two wins from five nominations, while sketch comedy show Fast Forward won three awards from four nominations. Jana Wendt won the Gold Logie for A Current Affair and Four Corners was inducted into the Hall of Fame.

== Nominees and winners ==
The nominations were published in the 7 March 1992 issue of TV Week. Winners are listed first and highlighted in bold.

=== National awards ===
==== Gold Logie ====
Gold Logie
**Most Popular Personality on Australian Television**
- **Jana Wendt for A Current Affair (Nine Network)**
  - Ray Martin for The Midday Show (Nine Network)
  - Georgie Parker for A Country Practice (Seven Network)
  - Steve Vizard for Tonight Live with Steve Vizard and Fast Forward (Seven Network / ATN Channel 7)

==== Acting and presenting ====
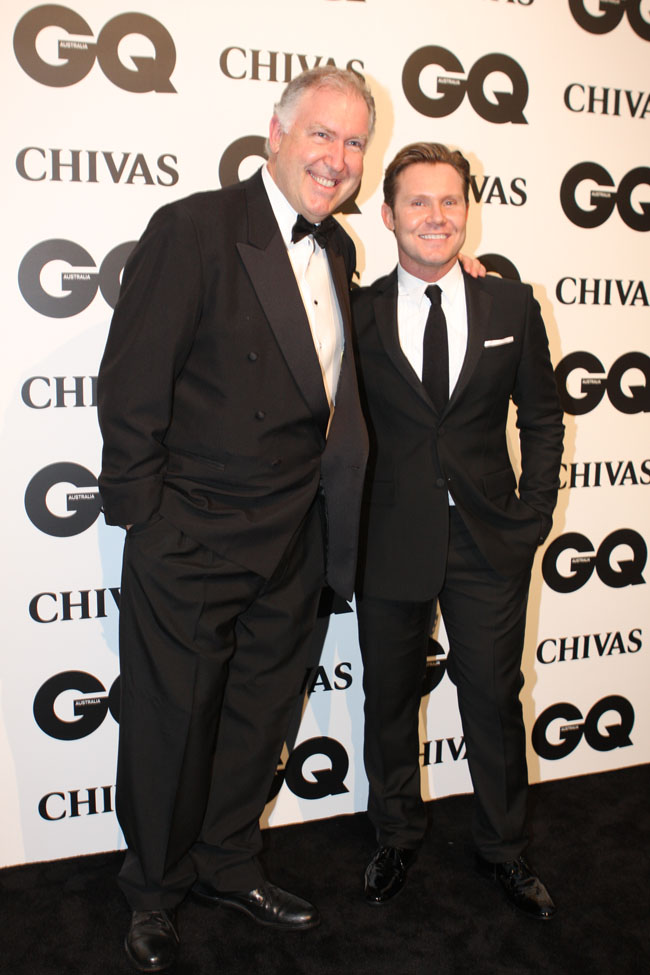
Steve Vizard (left), Most Popular Light Entertainment / Comedy Male Personality winner

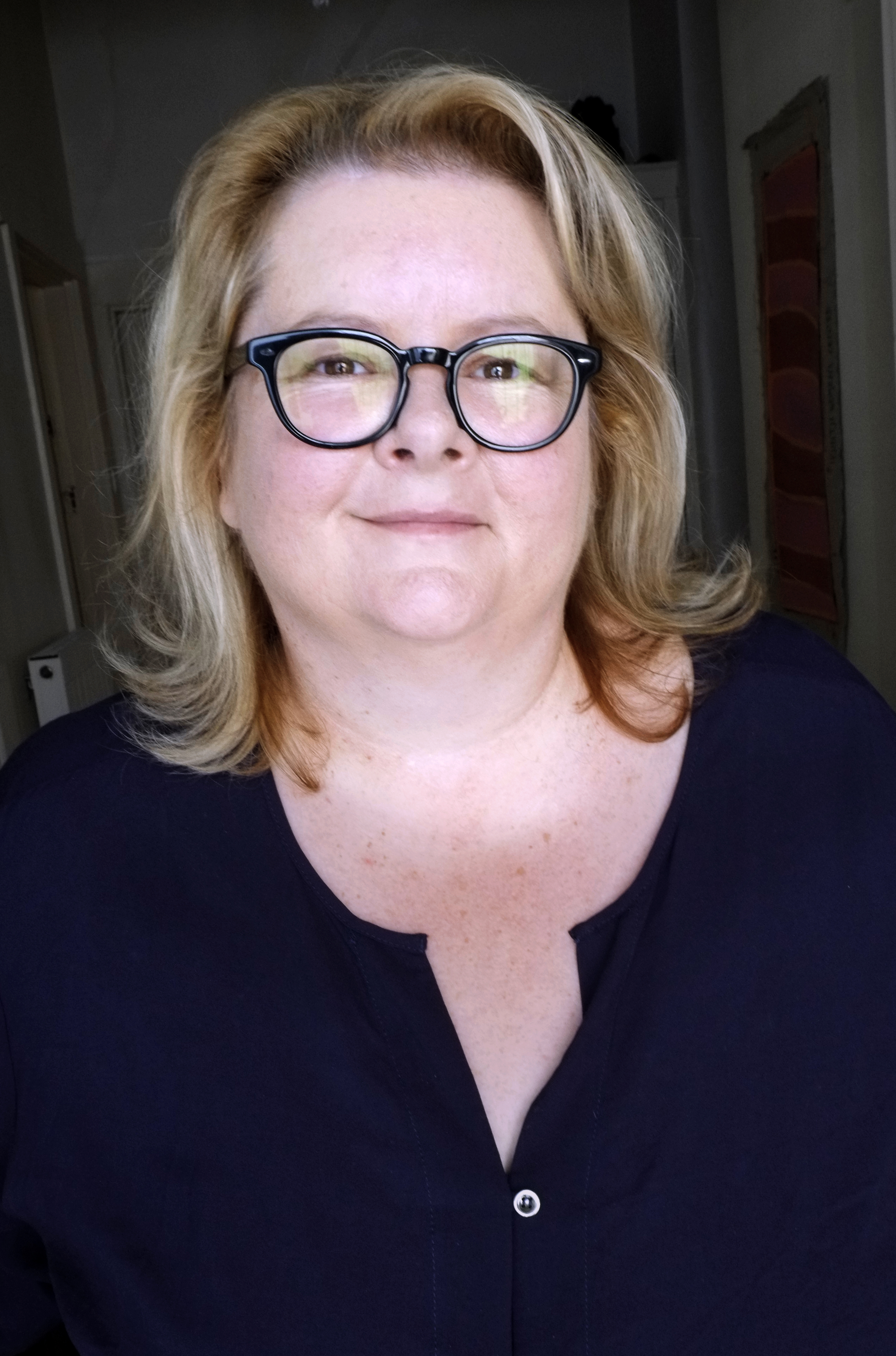
Magda Szubanski, Most Popular Light Entertainment / Comedy Female Personality winner

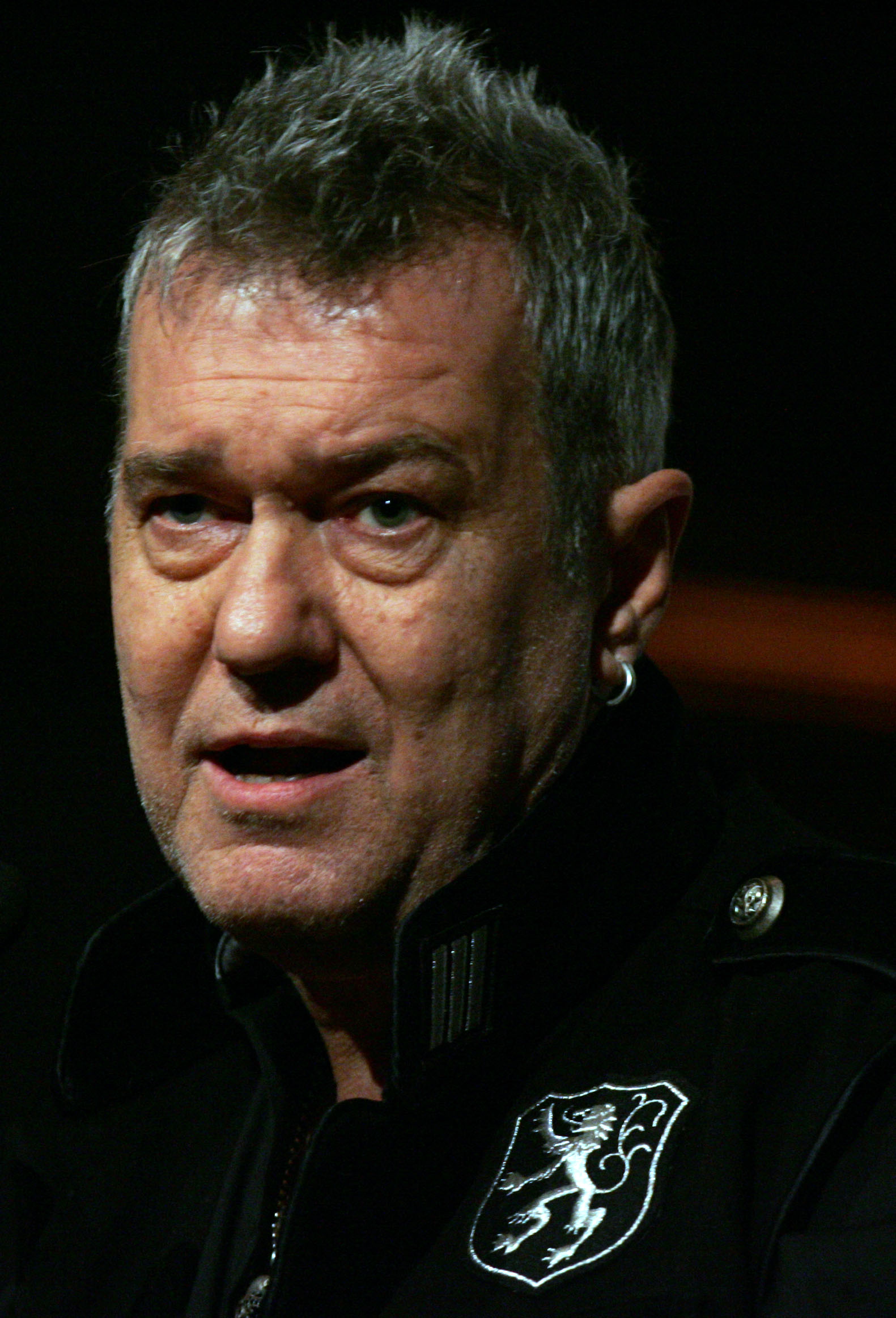
Jimmy Barnes, Most Popular Music Video winner

Acting and presenting
**Most Popular Actor On Australian TV**: **Bruce Samazan for E Street (Network Ten)**; Marcus Graham for E Street (Network Ten); Shane Porteous for A Country Practice (Seven Network); Gary Sweet for Police Rescue (ABC TV)	**Most Popular Actress On Australian TV**: **Georgie Parker for A Country Practice (Seven Network)**; Rebekah Elmaloglou for Home and Away (Seven Network); Rebecca Gibney All Together Now (Nine Network); Kate Raison for E Street (Network Ten)
**Most Popular Actor in a Telemovie or Miniseries**: **Cameron Daddo for Golden Fiddles (Nine Network)**; Tamblyn Lord for The River Kings (ABC TV); John Waters for Which Way Home (Network Ten)	**Most Popular Actress in a Telemovie or Miniseries**: **Josephine Byrnes for Brides of Christ (ABC TV)**; Rachel Friend for Golden Fiddles (Nine Network); Kym Wilson for Brides of Christ (ABC TV)
**Most Popular Light Entertainment/Comedy Male Personality**: **Steve Vizard for Fast Forward (Seven Network)**; Jon English for All Together Now (Nine Network); Daryl Somers for Hey Hey It's Saturday (Nine Network)	**Most Popular Light Entertainment/Comedy Female Personality**: **Magda Szubanski for Fast Forward (Seven Network)**; Rebecca Gibney for All Together Now (Nine Network); Julie McGregor for Hey Dad..! (Seven Network)
**Most Outstanding Actor On Australian TV**: **John McTernan for GP (ABC TV)**	**Most Outstanding Actress On Australian TV**: **Josephine Byrnes for Brides of Christ (ABC TV)**
**Most Popular New Talent In Australia**: **Kym Wilson for Brides of Christ (ABC TV)**; Matthew Krok for Hey Dad..! (Seven Network); Jeremy Sims for Chances (Nine Network); Melissa Tkautz for E Street (Network Ten)

==== Most Popular Programs and videos ====
Acting and presenting
**Most Popular Series**: **E Street (Network Ten)**; A Country Practice (Seven Network); Home and Away (Seven Network); The Flying Doctors (Nine Network)	**Most Popular Telemovie or Miniseries**: **Brides of Christ (ABC TV)**; Golden Fiddles (Nine Network); Which Way Home (Network Ten)
**Most Popular Light Entertainment/Comedy Program**: **Fast Forward (Seven Network)**; All Together Now (Nine Network); Hey Dad..! (Seven Network)	**Most Popular Public Affairs Program**: **A Current Affair (Nine Network)**; Hinch (Network Ten); 60 Minutes (Nine Network)
**Most Popular Lifestyle Information Program**: **Burke's Backyard (Nine Network)**; Beyond 2000 (Seven Network); What's Cooking? (Nine Network)	**Most Popular Sports Coverage**: **Cricket (Nine Network)**; AFL Grand Final (Seven Network); Tennis (Seven Network)
**Most Popular Children's Program**: **Agro's Cartoon Connection (Seven Network)**; The Bugs Bunny Show (Nine Network); Play School (ABC TV)	**Most Popular Music Video**: **"When Something Is Wrong with My Baby" by Jimmy Barnes featuring John Farnham**; "Read My Lips" by Melissa; "Treaty" by Yothu Yindi

==== Most Outstanding Programs ====
Most Outstanding Programs
**Most Outstanding Series**: **G.P. (ABC TV)**	**Most Outstanding Telemovie or Miniseries**: **Brides of Christ (ABC TV)**
**Most Outstanding Achievement in News**: "**Coode Island Fires**", **National Nine News (Nine Network)**	**Most Outstanding Achievement by a Regional Station**: "**The Soviet Union**", **Lateline (ABC TV)**
**Most Popular Lifestyle Information Program**: **The Very Fast Train (WIN Television)**	**Most Outstanding Single Documentary or Documentary Series**: **The Time of Your Life (ABC TV)**

=== State awards ===
==== New South Wales ====
Most Popular Personality
Winner: Ray Martin (Nine Network)

Most Popular Program
Winner: Home and Away (Seven Network)

==== Queensland ====
Most Popular Personality
Winner: Rob Brough (Seven Network)

Most Popular Program
Winner: Family Feud (Seven Network)

==== South Australia ====
Most Popular Personality
Winner: Anne Wills (Network Ten)

Most Popular Program
Winner: Wheel of Fortune (Seven Network)

==== Tasmania ====
Most Popular Personality
Winner: Ron Christie (TVT6)

Most Popular Program
Winner: Tasmania Today (TVT6)

==== Victoria ====
Most Popular Personality
Winner: Daryl Somers (Nine Network)

Most Popular Program
Winner: Neighbours (Network Ten)

==== Western Australia ====
Most Popular Personality
Winner: Rick Ardon (Seven Network)

Most Popular Program
Winner: Seven News (Seven Network)

== Performers ==
- Dannii Minogue
- Matthew Krok
- Ryan Clark
- Naomi Tuckfield
- Brooke Anderson
- Nick Giannopoulos
- Bruno Lucia
- Cathy Godbold

== Hall of Fame ==
After 40 years on Australian television, Four Corners became the ninth inductee into the TV Week Logie Logie Hall of Fame.

== Gold Logie controversy ==
I'm sorry she's not here. She's sorry she's not here, Jana, as she always does, put the program first. I know she regrets she's not here. It's a shame.

—Peter Meakin while accepting Wendt's Gold Logie.

The ceremony ended in controversy when A Current Affair host Jana Wendt was not present to accept her Gold Logie. It marked the first time in the history of the awards that the winner of the Gold Logie did not personally accept the statuette. Wendt was required to stay in the Sydney-based studios after the end of A Current Affair for an extended period to be able to cover any late breaking stories for time zones that would normally get ACA on a delay. TV Week claimed that they knew about a week in advance, three weeks after Wendt had posed with her fellow Gold Logie nominees for a TV Week photo shoot, that she may be missing from the awards presentation. Nine Network executives were said to be able to work around the challenges of ACA's production schedule if TV Week could assure them that Wendt was going to win the Gold. TV Week chose not to disclose that information to Nine, citing "the interests of maintaining the integrity and security of the Logies". The offer of a specially arranged flight to get Wendt from Sydney to Melbourne after ACA in time to witness the announcement of the Gold Logie winner was not enough to sway Nine's executives. Wendt's Gold Logie was ultimately accepted by Nine's head of current affairs at the time, Peter Meakin.

== Reception ==
Writing for The Sydney Morning Herald, Peter Luck gave the ceremony a mixed to negative review, calling it "the pits." He wrote "The setting was ordinary, the jokes were bad – and cruel to boot (even about the network that was putting them on) – and the entertainment was abysmal." Luck singled out Dannii Minogue's performance, which he thought might have been hampered by a sound problem, and a comedy routine with Magda Szubanski and actor Dennis Waterman as examples of how bad he thought the entertainment was. Luck believed the Logies had chosen the winners well though, citing Wendt, Byrnes, McTernan and Four Corners as deserving of their accolades.
