= Terry Serio =

Australian actor

- Born: 1956 (age 69–70); Western Australia, Australia
- Occupations: Actor, director, musician, singer-songwriter, teacher
- Years active: 1982–present
- Known for: Running on Empty (1982); Shout! The Story of Johnny O'Keefe (1986); Ocean Girl (1994); Janet King (2014–17); The Secret Daughter (2017)

Terry Serio (born 1956) is an Australian actor, director, musician and singer-songwriter.

== Career ==
=== Film and television ===
Serio's breakout role was as the lead, Mike in the 1982 Australian culture action film Running on Empty, alongside Max Cullen and Penne Hackforth-Jones. Early roles in the film With Prejudice (1983) and TV films High Country (1983) and Rooted (1985) followed. In 1986 he played the lead in biographical miniseries Shout! The Story of Johnny O'Keefe (for which he received AFI nomination for Best Actor) and in 1987 he played Franco in miniseries Fields of Fire.

Numerous guest roles in television series followed, including Rafferty's Rules, The Flying Doctors, A Country Practice, Chances, Phoenix and Police Rescue. In 1995, he played the recurring role of Captain Sam Phillips in thirteen episodes of Ocean Girl, before taking on further guest roles in Heartbreak High, G.P., Flipper, Fallen Angels, Wildside, All Saints, Stingers and Blue Heelers.

Television guest appearances continued into the 2000s, with Halifax f.p., Farscape, Water Rats, The Secret Life of Us, Young Lions, McLeod's Daughters, Home and Away, Blue Water High and Stupid, Stupid Man. Later television credits have included Underbelly, Rake and The Letdown. He had recurring roles as Terry Renner in legal series Janet King and Carmine in drama series The Secret Daughter.

Serio's film roles have included 1995 thriller Back of Beyond, 1997 family adventure comedy Joey and 2001 comedy/drama He Died With a Felafel in his Hand, starring Noah Taylor. He also appeared in the TV movie Heroes' Mountain (2002) based on the true story of the Thredbo tragedy and survival of Stuart Diver, starring Craig McLachlan. The same year, he appeared in 2002 crime comedy Dirty Deeds opposite an all-star cast including Bryan Brown, Toni Collette, Sam Neill, Sam Worthington and John Goodman.

In 2005, Serio starred in Little Fish, alongside Cate Blanchett, Sam Neill and Hugo Weaving and in 2009, he appeared in the TV movie A Model Daughter: The Killing of Caroline Byrne, based on a true story. In 2010 he was in 33 Postcards, alongside Guy Pearce and Claudia Karvan. His most recent film appearance was in the 2021 LGBTQIA film We All Lie My Darling.

Since 2011, Serio has been teaching Screen Acting at The Actors Pulse.

=== Theatre ===
Serio has also worked in theatre, both nationally and internationally, with roles in Rasputin, Hair, The Threepenny Opera, Blasted, 4.48 Psychosis, Summer Rain, Concussion, Under Ice and Way to Heaven at the Griffin Theatre. He notably played the roles of former prime ministers Bob Hawke and John Howard in the Belvoir musical Keating!, earning him the 2007 Helpmann Award for Best Male Actor in a Supporting Role in a Musical.

His radio show Stagefright on the cult radio station FBi 94.5FM has also been successful on the Sydney theatre scene.

=== Music ===
Serio is also an accomplished musician and singer/songwriter. He was a member of The Elks from 1976 to 1978. They released several albums and performed throughout Sydney and Melbourne.

In 1991, he was part of a twelve-piece country band, The Honky Tonk Angels, with fellow actors Justine Clarke, Lo Carmen, Noah Taylor and Kym Wilson as well as Monica McMahon and musical director Peter Head (Carmen's father). Guest performers included Robyn Archer and Tex Perkins. They performed in Sydney and Melbourne and appeared live on Tonight Live with Steve Vizard, but disbanded in 1992 without recording.

More recently, Serio has played in the country band urban roots band Ministry of Truth, which he formed in Sydney's Surry Hills together with Jon Schofield from Paul Kelly and the Coloured Girls. They performed at the Illawarra Folk Festival and Gulgong Folk Festival in 2014 and 2015, and have also recorded. The current sound and lineup was established early in 2010 and they still currently perform. He is also in Sydney band Oh Reach.

== Personal life ==
In 2016, Serio was the subject of a portrait by Clara Adolphs entered into the Archibald Prize.

== Awards ==
Year	Title	Award	Category	Result
1986	Shout! The Story of Johnny O'Keefe	AFI Awards	Best Actor in a Leading Role	Nominated
2007	Keating!	Helpmann Awards	Best Supporting Actor in a Musical	Won

== Filmography ==
=== Film ===
Year	Title	Role	Type
1982	Running on Empty	Mike	Feature film
1983	With Prejudice	Paul Alister	Feature film
1993	Say a Little Prayer	Song Mimer	Feature film
1993	A Divinity of Sorts	Rock Security 1	Short film
1995	Back of Beyond	Lucky Dave	Feature film
1997	Joey	TV Director	Feature film
1998	The Venus Factory	Angelo Dmitri	Feature film
1999	In the Red	Jack Hand	Feature film
2001	He Died with a Felafel in His Hand	Sydney Policeman #1	Feature film
2002	Dirty Deeds	Danny	Feature film
2005	Little Fish	Busker	Feature film
2007	The Final Winter	Panel Member	Feature film
2009	Wall Boy	Pimp	Short film
2009	Polly and Me	Boyfriend	Short film
2010	33 Postcards	Fletch	Feature film
2010	1MC: Something of Vengeance	Ted Walker	Feature film
2011	Cocks	Gay	Short film
2012	Isolate	Dad	Feature film
2012	Great Western	Chris	Short film
2012	Leech	Mr Leech	Short film
2013	The Telling	Javier	Short film
2013	Mask		Short film
2014	The Evil Within	Sony Manager	Short film
2014	Backwards Showgirl Variation	Peter	Short film
2016	Gangster Drag	Frank	Short film
2018	Hot Mess	Greg	Feature film
2020	Unsound	Brett	Feature film
2020	On Halloween	Whaa	Feature film
2021	We All Lie My Darling		Feature film

=== Television ===
Year	Title	Role	Type
1983	High Country	Dave Baxter	TV movie
1985	Rooted	Gary	TV movie
1986	Shout! The Story of Johnny O'Keefe	Johnny O’Keefe	Miniseries, 2 episodes
1987	Fields of Fire	Franco	Miniseries, season 1, 2 episodes
1987; 1988	Rafferty's Rules	Bomber Clayton – Police Prosecutor	TV series, season 2, 4 episodes
1989	The Flying Doctors	The Bantam	Season 5, episode 10: "The Instrument"
1989	A Country Practice	Carl Bailey	Season 9, 2 episodes
1990	Fresh Start	Dennis	Episode 12
1991	Chances	Bruce Parker	Season 1, episode 35
1992	Phoenix	Barney	Season 1, episode 11: "Hair of the Dog"
1993	Police Rescue	Chicka	Season 3, episode 19: "The Last to Know"
1994	Law of the Land	Greg Rodwell	Season 3, episode 10: "A Matter of Inches"
1995	Ocean Girl	Captain Sam Phillips	Season 2, 13 episodes
1995	Heartbreak High	Tim Beckett / Jim Scully	Season 3, 3 episodes
1994; 1996	G.P.	Michael / Billy Walker	2 episodes
1995–2000	Blue Heelers	Mick Doyle / Paul Reynolds	9 episodes
1996	Flipper	Henchman	Season 2, episode 1: "The White Dolphin"
1997	Fallen Angels	Cosimo Mazzoni	2 episodes
1998	Wildside	John Depusa	Season 1, episode 18
1999	All Saints	Greg Costello	Season 2, 3 episodes
1999	Stingers	Frampton	Season 2, episode 8: "White Lies"
2000	Halifax f.p.	Detective Harry Davenport	Season 5, episode 3: “A Hate Worse than Death”
2001	Farscape	Colonel Lennok	Season 3, episode 5: "...Different Destinations"
1996–2001	Water Rats	Various roles	5 episodes
2001	The Secret Life of Us	Producer	Season 1, episode 15: "The Gap"
2002	Heroes’ Mountain	Shane Butler	TV movie
2002	Young Lions	Detective Shane Wesson	3 episodes
2002	Bad Cop, Bad Cop	Bruno Rocco	Miniseries, episode 7: "A Joint Venture"
2003	Grass Roots	Stevens Rantzen	Season 2, episode 3: "Garbage"
2003	Snobs	Graeme	Miniseries, episode 5
2004	McLeod’s Daughters	Vin Riley	Season 4, episode 22: "For Love or Money"
2005–2006	Home and Away	Dudley Shepherd	4 episodes
2006	Blue Water High	Surf Shop Owner	Season 2, episode 8
2006	BlackJack: At the Gates	Police Investigator	TV movie
2007–2008	Stupid, Stupid Man	John Hunt	Season 2, 2 episodes
2009	A Model Daughter: The Killing of Caroline Byrne	Paul Jacob	TV movie
2012	Underbelly: Badness	Terry Falconer	Season 5, episode 1: "Thy Will Be Done"
2014–2017	Janet King	Terry Renner	Season 1, 8 episodes
2015	Shit Creek	Mr Motherfucker	Miniseries
2016	Rake	Rance Petrie	Season 4, episode 5
2017	The Letdown	Counsellor	Season 1, episode 3: "Trivial Pursuits"
2016–2017	The Secret Daughter	Carmine	Seasons 1–2, 11 episodes
2019–2020	Reckoning	Rooster	Miniseries, 3 episodes
2020	Dick Slider	Don Uts	Season 2, episode 1: "Squad"
2020	Bondi Slayer	Christopher	2 episodes

== Theatre ==
=== As actor ===
Year	Title	Role	Type
1983	Trafford Tanzi	Dean	Seymour Centre, Sydney, Comedy Theatre, Melbourne
1984	Beach Blanket Tempest	Frankie	Australian tour with New Moon Theatre Company
1986	No Worries		Wharf Theatre, Sydney with STC for Sydney Festival
1986	Pearls Before Swine	Ram Bovine	Belvoir Theatre Company, Seymour Centre, Sydney, Universal Theatre, Melbourne
1987	Rasputin: The Musical Revolution	Prince Felix Yussopov	State Theatre, Sydney
1989	The Mound Builders		Bondi Pavilion, Sydney with Underground Theatre Productions
1989	Kid Stakes		Bondi Pavilion, Sydney with Underground Theatre Productions
1990	Favourite Son		Comedy Theatre, Melbourne
1991–1992	Hair - The Tribal Love Rock Musical	Berger	Australian national tour with Elston, Hocking & Woods
1993	A Rare Jewel		Newcastle Civic Theatre
1994	Villain of Flowers		NIDA Parade Theatre, Sydney
1998	The Present		Stables Theatre, Sydney
2003	The Threepenny Opera	Tiger Brown	Belvoir Street Theatre, Sydney
2004	Blasted	Ian	Belvoir Street Theatre, Sydney
2004	4.48 Psychosis		Stables Theatre, Sydney
2005	Bones	Reg	Darlinghurst Theatre, Sydney
2005	Summer Rain	Barry Doyle	Sydney Theatre with STC
2006	7 Blowjobs		Seymour Centre, Sydney with B Sharp
2006–08	Keating!	Bob Hawke / John Howard	Australian national tour with Belvoir Won 2007 Helpmann Award for Best Supporting Actor in a Musical
2009	Concussion	Caesar	Wharf Theatre, Sydney with Griffin Theatre Company & STC
2009	Under Ice	Paul Niemand	Stables Theatre, Sydney with Griffin Theatre Company
2010	Way to Heaven	Gottfried	Stables Theatre, Sydney with Griffin Theatre Company
2010	Fool for Love		Belvoir Street Theatre, Sydney
2011	The Seagull	Shamrayev	Belvoir Street Theatre, Sydney
2011	Mongrel		Newtown Theatre, Sydney for Sydney Fringe Festival
2012	Rapid Write: Hollywood Ending	Don	Stables Theatre, Sydney with Theatre503 & Griffin Independent
2013	Machinal	Adding Clerk	Wharf Theatre, Sydney with STC
2014	The Young Tycoons	CEO Donald Mayes	Eternity Playhouse, Sydney with Darlinghurst Theatre Company
2014	The Winter’s Tale	Antigonus / Autolycus	Bell Shakespeare
2015	Of Mice and Men	The Boss	Seymour Centre, Sydney, Canberra Theatre Centre with Sport For Jove Theatre Company
2015	A Riff on Keef: The Human Myth	Keef	Stables Theatre, Sydney with Griffin Theatre Company
2019	The Sentimental Bloke	Mr Capper and others	Hayes Theatre Company, Sydney with Neglected Musicals
2021	After the Afterglow	Presenter / Self (solo show)	Bakehouse Studio Theatre, Adelaide with Adelaide Fringe Festival
2022	Dubbo Championship Wrestling	Des	Hayes Theatre Company, Sydney

=== As director ===
Year	Title	Role	Type
2005	Kiss of the Alien	Director	Newtown Theatre, Sydney for Short+Sweet
2021	The Twins	Director	Holden Street Theatres for Adelaide Fringe
