= Kym Wilson =

Australian actress (born 1973)

- Born: 1 April 1973 (age 53); Brisbane, Queensland, Australia
- Education: Stella Maris College
- Occupations: Actress; television presenter
- Years active: 1985–present
- Spouse: Sean O'Byrne (m. 2009)
- Partner: Jeremy Sims (1990s)

Kym Wilson (born 1 April 1973) is an Australian actress and former television host. Her breakout role was that of Rosemary Fitzgerald in the 1991 miniseries Brides of Christ, which earned her the Logie Award for Most Popular New Talent. She played Darcy Hudson in A Country Practice from 1991 until the series' cancellation in 1993. She then took on the recurring role of Sam Robinson in Heartbreak High. Wilson co-hosted the music program Video Smash Hits from 1992 to 1994. Further roles included Tess McLeod in the McLeod's Daughters television film, Charlotte Holloway in The Man from Snowy River and Raelene Gregson in All Saints. Wilson has also appeared in several theatre productions, including The Crucible and Blackrock.

== Early life ==
Wilson was born in Brisbane on 1 April 1973. She attended singing and dance classes from a young age. When she was six years old, she acquired an agent and she later appeared in television commercials. At the age of eight, her family moved to Sydney. She attended Stella Maris College in Manly. Wilson left school during Year 11 to pursue an acting career.

== Career ==
Wilson made her television debut playing a minor role in the 1985 miniseries Professor Poopsnagle's Steam Zeppelin opposite Justine Clarke when she was 11 years old. Five years later, she appeared in John Duigan's 1991 film Flirting, the sequel to The Year My Voice Broke, alongside Nicole Kidman and Noah Taylor. Duigan recommend Wilson for her breakout role of Rosemary Fitzgerald in the 1991 ABC TV miniseries Brides of Christ. In 1992, she won the Logie Award for Most Popular New Talent for her role in the miniseries.

Wilson appeared in the Sydney Theatre Company's 1991 production of The Crucible, before joining the main cast of medical drama A Country Practice as Darcy Hudson in 1991. She replaced Emily Symons as co-host of the music program Video Smash Hits from 25 January 1992 until 1994. After A Country Practice ended in 1993, she had a three month recurring role as teacher Sam Robinson in Heartbreak High. She also filmed a role in miniseries The Man from Snowy River and appeared in David Williamson's play Brilliant Lies. Wilson appears in the Cody: The Wrong Stuff telemovie as Skye, a love interest for the main character played by Gary Sweet.

In 1995, Wilson co-founded the theatrical production company Pork Chop Productions with her then-boyfriend Jeremy Sims. The company staged a production of Rosencrantz and Guildenstern Are Dead at the Belvoir street theatre, which Wilson produced and Sims directed and starred as Guildenstern. Wilson guested in a March 1995 episode of G.P. as the girlfriend of Michael Winters (played by Brian Rooney). She also starred as Rachel in the Sydney Theatre Company's first production of Nick Enright's play Blackrock, before taking the role of "streetwise" Tiffany in 1996. Wilson appeared in the 1996 Australian film Inner Sanctuary, and had a starring role as Tess McLeod in the original McLeod's Daughters telefilm. Wilson did not reprise her role for the subsequent television series. She made a guest appearance in an episode of Water Rats in February 1997.

In April 1998, Wilson appeared in the guest role of Raelene in All Saints. She also starred in Geoffrey Brown's thriller film Reflections. Midway through 1998, Wilson relocated to the United States and she undertook a three-month acting scholarship assisted by the Winston Churchill Fellowship. She undertook studies at a Shakespearian company in Massachusetts, and the Moscow Art Theatre at Harvard. Wilson appeared nude on the cover of the May 1999 edition of Australian Playboy. She had previously appeared semi-naked in the first issue of Black+White magazine in 1992.

In 2001, Wilson appeared in a Brisbane stage production of Secret Bridesmaids' Business. She provided voice acting for the 2002 video game Ty the Tasmanian Tiger and its 2004 and 2005 sequels.

She took a hiatus from acting to work as the LA-based business partner of Sydney fashion designer Leona Edmiston. She enjoyed the experience but realised that acting was still her passion. In 2015, she returned to Sydney, to sell her first home in Elvina Bay. She also planned to return to television and was developing a limited television series with her husband. Wilson appeared in Australian Theatre Company's production of Speaking in Tongues at the Matrix Theatre in Hollywood, which earned her a Stage Scene LA award for Outstanding Performance by an Actress in a Leading Role.

In the early 1990s, Wilson played in Sydney country and western band, Honky Tonk Angels, together with fellow actors Loene Carmen, Justine Clarke, Noah Taylor, Terry Serio and Carmen's father Peter Head. They performed in Sydney and Melbourne and appeared live on Tonight Live with Steve Vizard, but disbanded in 1992, without recording. A book about the band, Honky Tonk Angels: An Illustrated History was written by Carmen in 2011.

Together with her husband, Wilson runs BonnieBlue Productions.

== Personal life ==
Wilson began a relationship with fellow Australian actor and director Jeremy Sims in late 1991. They met through her Brides of Christ co-star Josephine Byrnes and got to know one another at a charity flower show. They appeared together in a production of Love Letters at the Sydney Opera House in April 1992. Wilson and Sims became engaged and were set to be married on 1 April 1994, but the wedding was postponed when Wilson accepted a recurring guest role in television series The Man from Snowy River.

In November 1997, Wilson and her then-boyfriend, Sydney barrister Andrew Reyment were the last people to see INXS frontman Michael Hutchence alive, after they had visited him in his hotel 10 hours before his death.

Wilson married her partner of ten years, Canadian screenwriter Sean O'Byrne on 9 October 2009.

As of 2008, Wilson was a board member of Australians in Film, based in Los Angeles.

== Acting credits ==
=== Film ===
Year	Title	Role	Notes
1991	Flirting	Melissa Miles	
1996	Inner Sanctuary	Fiona	
1998	Reflections	Beth Owens	
2010	He She We	Cynthia	Short
2017	Treehouse	Laura	Short
2017	Weekend Getaway	Blythe	Short
2018	Haunted, Horrifying Sounds from Beyond the Grave	Wendy Stockdotter	Short
2018	Black Knuckle and Deputy Maltese	Sheriff Schaefer	Short
2019	Reborn	Valerie	Short

=== Television ===
Year	Title	Role	Notes
1985	Professor Poopsnagle's Steam Zeppelin	Alice	
1989	A Country Practice	Leanne Baxter	Episodes: "Fly Away Home: Parts 1 & 2"
1990	Family and Friends	Blondie	
1991	Brides of Christ	Rosemary Fitzgerald	Miniseries
1991–1993	A Country Practice	Darcy Hudson	Main cast
1992	The Main Event	Panellist	
1992–1993	Video Smash Hits	Co-Host	
1994–1995	Heartbreak High	Sam Robinson	Season 1
1995	Cody: The Wrong Stuff	Skye	TV film
1995	G.P.	Tanya	Episode: "Filial Contract"
1995	The Ferals	Nikki	Episode: "Mixy Mania"
1995	The Man from Snowy River (aka Snowy River: The MacGregor Saga)	Charlotte Holloway	Episodes: "The Railroad", "Fathers & Sons"
1996	McLeod's Daughters	Tess McLeod	TV film
1997	Water Rats	Amanda White	Episode: "Closed Circuit"
1998	All Saints	Raelene Gregson	Episodes: "Terminal Speed", "Heart to Heart", "Nothing But the Truth"
1999	Without Warning	Josie Newman	TV film
2002	The Lost World	Narina	Episode: "A Witch's Calling"

=== Theatre ===
Year	Title	Role	Notes
1974	The Book of Job		University of Adelaide
1991	The Crucible		Sydney Opera House with STC
1992	Love Letters	Melissa Gardner	Sydney Opera House with STC
1994	Brilliant Lies		Civic Playhouse, Newcastle with Hunter Valley Theatre Company
1995	Emerald City		Ensemble Theatre
1995–1996	Blackrock	Rachel/Tiffany	Wharf Theatre with STC, Canberra Theatre
1996	The New Rocky Horror Show	Janet	Lyric Theatre, Brisbane with Paul Dainty
1996	Tales of a Faerie Called Angel		Wharf Theatre
1997	The La Mama 30th Birthday Celebration		La Mama Theatre
2001	Secret Bridesmaids' Business	Meg	Playhouse, Brisbane with La Boite
2016	Speaking in Tongues	Sonja	Matrix Theatre, Hollywood with Australian Theatre Company

== Awards and nominations ==
Year	Association	Category	Work	Result	Ref
1992	Logie Awards	Most Popular New Talent	Brides of Christ	Won	
1992	Logie Awards	Most Popular Actress in a Telemovie or Miniseries	Brides of Christ	Nominated	
1993	Logie Awards	Most Popular Actress	A Country Practice	Nominated	
1994	Logie Awards	Most Popular Actress	A Country Practice	Longlisted	
2016	Stage Scene LA Award	Outstanding Performance by an Actress in a Leading Role	Speaking in Tongues	Won	
2019	Independent Shorts Awards	Best Supporting Actress	Erin	Won	
