= Joy Seager =

British doctor and writer (1899–1991)

- Born: Joyce Debenham Tearne; 20 September 1899; Edgbaston, West Midlands, England
- Died: 7 September 1991; Mount Pleasant, South Australia
- Other names: Dr Joyce Debenham Seager
- Education: University of Sydney
- Occupation: physician
- Known for: Kangaroo Island doctor
- Spouses: Harold William Hastings Seager; Stanley Charles Henniker
- Children: three

Joyce Debenham Seager MBE born Joyce Debenham Tearne known as Joy Seager (20 September 1899 – 7 September 1991) was a British-born physician, best known for being the only medical practitioner on Kangaroo Island, Australia from 1925. She wrote her biography and it became a TV mini-series.

== Life ==
Seager was born in England's Black Country, in Edgbaston, West Midlands. She was the last of three children born to Maude Mary (born Lee) and her husband Theodore Stephen Tearne. The family emigrated to Australia in 1907. Her father taught music and in 1909 he became the head of the New South Wales Department of Public Instruction music department. She went to Sydney Church of England Girls Grammar and Sydney Girls' High School. Seager went on to graduate in medicine in 1924 from the University of Sydney. She was briefly employed in hospitals but at the beginning of 1925 she became the only doctor, dentist and pharmacist on Kangaroo Island off the coast of South Australia.

She married a grazier who had been a Major and at Gallipoli in her first year. She had no vehicle or phone and journeys were made on horseback over dirt tracks. She established a temporary hospital and in 1930 a permanent one was built.

In May 1944 she took up a new position as (the only) doctor in Kingston and in the following year her husband had a new farm nearby. She handled an outbreak of diphtheria and made early use of penicillin. In 1950 they made their final move to Mount Pleasant.

In 1965 she accompanied her husband as he travelled back with other veterans to Gallipoli after 50 years. On board, some of the occupants became ill and Seager cared for them, buying drugs and supplies. In 1966 she was awarded an MBE. Her first husband died in 1976 and in the following year she married Stanley Charles Henniker who was also a grazier.

In 1980 she published her biography as Kangaroo Island Doctor. The book was made into an Australian TV series, Shadows of the Heart, that was filmed on Kangaroo Island. The series was nominated in the Best Miniseries or Telefeature category in the 1991 Australian Film Institute Awards, and Josephine Byrnes was nominated for Best Lead Actress in a Television Drama.

Seager died in Mount Pleasant in 1991.
