= My Eyes =

My Eyes may refer to:

- My Eyes (film), a 2024 Australian film.
- "My Eyes" (Blake Shelton song), 2014
- "My Eyes" (Fayray song), 2000
- "My Eyes" (Travis song), 2007
- "My Eyes" (Travis Scott song), 2023
- "My Eyes", a song in Dr. Horrible's Sing-Along Blog
- "My Eyes", a 1990 song by Dio from Lock Up the Wolves
- "My Eyes", a 2016 song by the Lumineers from Cleopatra
