= Little White Lies (1996 film) =

- Directed by: Pauline Chan
- Written by: Henry Tefay; Kee Young
- Produced by: John Sexton
- Starring: Mimi Rogers; Andrew McFarlane; Temuera Morrison; Robert Coleby; Nicholas Hope
- Release date: 14 October 1996
- Running time: 96 minutes
- Country: Australia
- Language: English

Little White Lies is a 1996 Australian thriller film. It was shot from 20 November 1995 to 16 February 1996 in Brisbane.
