= Singapore Sling (1994 film) =

- Based on: story by John Goldsmith
- Written by: Robert Marchand
- Directed by: Robert Marchand
- Starring: John Waters
- Music by: Mario Millo
- Country of origin: Australia
- Original language: English

Production
- Producers: Paul Barron; Julie Monton
- Cinematography: Martin McGrath
- Editor: Marc van Buuren
- Running time: 90 min
- Production company: Barron Films

Original release
- Network: TCN 9
- Release: 9 March 1994

Singapore Sling is a 1994 Australian television film about a private eye in Singapore. Directed by Robert Marchand, it led to a series of TV films. John Waters stars as John Stamford who is investigating drug counterfeiters. Also featured are Deborra-Lee Furness and Jan-Michael Vincent.

The Age's Jim Schembri called it "passable minor-league intrigue" and says "Plot is one thing. Pace is another, and Singapore Sling has enough of that to keep you from having to think too much about the minutiae of what exactly is going on." The Sydney Morning Herald's Robin Oliver wrote "This is a prime example of an ill-constructed, badly acted, remorselessly predictable, atrociously directed, uninteresting and generally unnecessary telemovie."

Three more TV movies featuring John Stamford appeared in 1995, Singapore Sling: Road to Mandalay, Singapore Sling: Old Flames and Singapore Sling: Midnight Orchid.

== Cast ==
- John Waters as John Stamford
- Deborra-Lee Furness as Annie
- Jan-Michael Vincent as Billy
- Burkhard Heyl as Helmut
- Patricia Stephenson as Esther
- Paul Chubb as Cray
- Andy Anderson as Hooper
