= Shout! The Story of Johnny O'Keefe =

- Written by: Robert Caswell
- Directed by: Ted Robinson
- Starring: Terry Serio; John McTernan; Candy Raymond
- Country of origin: Australia
- Original language: English
- No. of episodes: 2

Production
- Producer: Ben Gannon
- Running time: 120 min.
- Production company: View Pictures Ltd
- Budget: $2.2 million

Original release
- Network: Channel Seven
- Release: 8 April 1986 – 1986

Shout! The Story of Johnny O'Keefe is a two part Australian dramatisation about the life of musician Johnny O'Keefe from his peak success in the 1950s. The project was written by Robert Caswell.

== Cast ==
- Terry Serio as Johnny O'Keefe
- John McTernan as Lee Gordon
- Marcelle Schmitz as Marianne
- Candy Raymond as Maureen
- Tony Barry as Alan Heffernan
- John Paramor as Bill Haley
- Steve Shaw as Catfish Purser
- Greg Stone as Deejay Doublebass
- John Polson as Deejay Saxophone
- Robert Alexander as Brother Marzorini
- Russell Newman as Ray O'Keefe
- Melissa Jaffer as Thelma O'Keefe
- Nick Holland as Smythe
- Ritchie Singer as Max Moore
- Roger Ward as Police Sergeant
- Leanne Bundy as Widgie
- Jan Ringrose as Sally
- Simone Taylor as Dixie
- Rob Thomas as Festival Manager
- Chuck McKinney as Little Richard
- Liz Harris as Valda Marshall
- Nique Needles as Col Joye
- Arthur Sherman as Clay
- Alton Harvey as Ed Sullivan
- Elizabeth Burton as Stripper
- Diana Davidson as Matriach
- Robbie McGregor as Australian Doctor
- Slim De Grey as Taxi Driver
- Ian 'Molly' Meldrum as Himself
- Donna Gubbay in a bit part
- Chris Hession in a bit part
- Greg Curran in a bit part
- Paul Flaherty in a bit part
- Ross Higgins as Voiceovers
- Kellie Turner as Girl in pub

== Soundtrack ==
=== Charts ===
Chart (1986)	Peak position
Australia (Kent Music Report)	27

== Review ==
Albert Moran called the series a "vivid evocative biography", praising Serio for his depiction of O'Keefe's "manic drive", and McTernan for his "fine performance" as Lee Gordon. He describes the production as "bordering on surrealism", particularly in the scenes where the singer has been committed to an English mental institution.
