= Singapore Sling: Old Flames =

- Written by: Peter Schreck
- Directed by: Michael Carson
- Starring: John Waters
- Music by: Mario Millo
- Country of origin: Australia
- Original language: English

Production
- Producers: Paul Barron; Julie Monton
- Cinematography: Louis Irving
- Editor: Marc van Buuren
- Running time: 90 min
- Production company: Barron Films

Original release
- Network: TCN 9
- Release: 16 August 1995

Singapore Sling: Old Flames is a 1995 Australian television film about a private eye in Singapore. It is a followup to Singapore Sling, Singapore Sling: Road to Mandalay and Singapore Sling: Midnight Orchid. John Waters stars as John Stamford who investigates a stunt gone wrong during the production of an action movie. Also featured are Josephine Byrnes and Chris Haywood.

The Age's Jim Schembri criticised the script for "the latest instalment in the adventures ot John Stamford, the world's blandest private investigator." He writes says "like previous Slings, the performance of John Waters as Stamford still lacks panache." Brian Courtis in the Sunday Age asks "What has made this Australian series of telemovies such a stinker?"

== Cast ==
- John Waters as John Stamford
- Josephine Byrnes as Carla Singer
- Simon Bossell as Tony
- Jemma Wilks as Lily Ho
- Lech Mackiewicz as Spader
- Hugh Keays-Byrne as Bob Lantos
- Ray Barrett as Sir Leyton Jones
- Chris Haywood as Sonny
- Priscilla Barnes as Frankie
- Susan Gorence as Fiona Shapiro
- Justin Monjo as Dave Ruxton
- Monroe Reimers as Feroz
