= Traps (1994 film) =

- Directed by: Pauline Chan
- Written by: Pauline Chan; Robert Carter
- Based on: Dreamhouse by Kate Grenville
- Produced by: Jim McElroy
- Starring: Saskia Reeves; Jacqueline McKenzie; Sami Frey
- Cinematography: Kevin Hayward
- Edited by: Nicholas Beauman
- Music by: Douglas Stephen Rae
- Distributed by: Ronin Films
- Release date: 1994
- Running time: 100 minutes
- Country: Australia
- Language: English
- Budget: A$3.5 million
- Box office: A$130,500 (Australia)

Traps is a 1994 Australian film directed by Pauline Chan and starring Saskia Reeves, Jacqueline McKenzie, and Sami Frey.

It is not to be confused with the other Australian film named Traps (1985).

== Premise ==
Set in Vietnam during the 1950s, journalist Michael Duffield (Robert Reynolds) and his English photographer wife Louisa (Saskia Reeves) arrive at the plantation of a Frenchman named Daniel (Sami Frey) and his daughter Sarah (Jacqueline McKenzie).

== Cast ==
- Saskia Reeves as Louise Duffield
- Robert Reynolds as Michael Duffield
- Jacqueline McKenzie as Viola
- Sami Frey as Daniel
- Kiet Lam as Tuan
- Hoa To as Tatie Chi

== Reception ==
On SBS's The Movie Show, Margaret Pomeranz and David Stratton both gave the film 3 1/2 stars. Pomeranz said: "the film creates a mood and an era that is complex and powerful, so that I was seduced by this story of a woman trying to come to terms with her own need for independence." Later reviewing for Variety, Stratton wrote "Chan pulls the various strands of the film together with skill; Traps is a very well-made film, though it lacks the dazzling style of the director’s shorts." Writing in the Sydney Morning Herald Paul Byrnes gave it a mixed review writing "The film has competing impulses and ambitions, rather than a feel of unity. Chan does not balance the interior life of the characters with the exterior drama. The interior has all the tension; the fight between colonials and nationalists has very little, making it seem an exotic backdrop." Neil Jillett from The Age was also mixed, finishing "Despite the film’s clumsiness in political and professional matters, Chan does draw with considerable subtlety a parallel between the Michael-Louise situation and the way the French and the Vietnamese – the imperialists and the colonised – view each other. So Traps, at its best, is a film that works, with considerable naturalistic and metaphorical power, on two levels." In Cinema Papers, Scott Murray gave it a mixed review, finishing: "Traps is not an overly successful film, but, as first films in Australia go, it is a good start. If Chan has tackled more than she can handle, this is surely preferable to the many minor-key efforts passing as striking débuts these days." The Sun-Herald's Rob Lowin gave it two stars; noting: "Traps doesn’t succeed – there are too many holes in plot and spaces in characterisation to weave the required tapestry. But as a calling card, it's memorable." The Sunday Age's Tom Ryan also gave it two stars calling it a "Thoughtful Australian drama set in Vietnam and dealing with displaced people and their struggle for liberation." In Australian Film, 1978-1994, Jan Epstein concludes "Although the last quarter of the film fails to maintain psychological tension and devolves into conventionality, the female line is consistently well-handled, and the lush photography and authentic settings make Traps worth seeing."

Internationally, Traps had mixed to negative reviews. Stephen Holden of The New York Times writes "It's not the actors' fault that their characters don't make psychological sense. Their shrill erotic charades are metaphoric shortcuts in a film that can't be bothered to develop credible characters or tell a complex story." In the LA Times Kevin Thomas called it "awkward, painfully sincere", finishing: "Traps is such a passionately committed film that it generates considerable raw emotion, and there's a great deal of honesty in the way Chan's four principals fumble around, sensing a need to connect with themselves and each other. But in delving into messy lives, entangled in politics and emotions, Chan has been unable to keep her film from seeming something of a mess itself." San Francisco Chronicle's Peter Stack states "Though the film is weakened by an ending that seems to trail off, Traps is tantalizing." San Francisco Examiner's Barbara Shulgasser finishes: "Chan loses her way as the film ends. She decides to wrap up the proceedings by targeting a convenient villain. But she doesn't prepare us for this sudden and surprising evil. When a country erupts into gory retribution and murder, villains and heros [sic] become difficult to tell apart anyway."

== Awards ==
- 1994 Australian Film Institute Awards
  - Best Original Music Score – Stephen Rae – won
  - Best Actor in a Supporting Role – Kiet Lam – nominated
  - Best Actress in a Supporting Role – Jacqueline McKenzie – nominated
  - Best Adapted Screenplay – Robert Carter, Pauline Chan (from Dreamhouse (novel) by Kate Grenville) – nominated
  - Best Production Design – Michael Philips – nominated
