= Running on Empty (1982 film) =

Australian action film

Running On Empty
- Film poster under the American title
- Directed by: John Clark
- Written by: Barry Tomblin
- Produced by: Pom Oliver
- Starring: Terry Serio; Deborah Conway; Max Cullen
- Cinematography: David Gribble
- Edited by: Stuart Armstrong
- Music by: Peter Crosbie
- Distributed by: Roadshow
- Release date: 3 November 1982
- Running time: 83 minutes
- Country: Australia
- Language: English
- Budget: A$2 million
- Box office: A$1,218,000 (Australia)

Running on Empty (released in the United States as Fast Lane Fever) is a 1982 Australian action film. The film was a minor success at the box office and has become a cult film because of its depiction of Australian street racing culture and cars of the period.

It was shot in Canbelego, Cobar and Sydney, New South Wales, and is set at a time of delivery strikes, when fuel in Australia was rationed, the source of several of its humorous incidents. American terms such as "gas" for petrol and "trunk" for boot are used throughout the film.

== Plot ==
Mike, a factory worker and street car racer, owns an XY Ford Falcon GTHO. His hippie parents are somewhat distant. He gets involved with a local race gang headed by Fox, club ("aces") owner and drug dealer, then starts a relationship with Fox's girl, Julie. Mike's car is ambushed and set on fire by the Gazzard boys, who run an FB Holden. Mike saves the car from total destruction (and their lives) by driving it into a swamp. He takes what's left of his "pride and joy" to Rebel, a blind (Note: The NSW Blind Society was credited with assisting with Cullen's depiction.) mechanic who has adopted Mike as a surrogate son. He modifies the engine for nitrous oxide operation, but the race ends when he drives into a log-carrier and wakes in hospital. The Ford is beyond repair, so Rebel gives Mike his supercharged '57 Chevy to race against Fox, a chance for vicarious victory. Mike's assistant Tony has become disenchanted with being sidelined, but agrees to help one more time. Mike challenges Fox again, and wins. Fox, whose illegal operations have been taken over by the crooked cop Jagger and his sadistic sidekick Dave, kills himself by driving into a concrete barrier and is immolated.

== Cast ==
- Terry Serio as Mike
- Richard Moir as Fox
- Deborah Conway as Julie
- Vangelis Mourikis as Tony
- Gerard Sont as Victor
- Max Cullen as Rebel
- Grahame Bond as Jagger
- Penne Hackforth-Jones as Dave
- Chris Haywood as Photographer
- Johnny Utah as Workman
- Warren Blondell as Lee
- Ric Carter as Country Boy
- Jon Darling as Workman
- Peter Davies as Ram's Mate
- Mervyn Drake as Country Boy
- Kristoffer Greaves as Starter
- Paul Johnstone as Lecherous Garage Attendant
- Maurice Hughes as Foreman
- Tim McLean as Photographer's Assistant
- Brian McNevin as Fox's Timer
- Sno Norton-Sinclair as Starter's Mate
- Robin Ramsay as Dad
- Geoff Rhoe as Ram
- Keli Roberts as Sheryl
- Anne Semler as Joan
- Jeff Truman as Country Boy
- Jacki Simmons as Nurse

== Cars ==
- Ford Falcon GTHO Phase III
- Dodge Challenger
- 57 Chevy

== Production ==
The film was funded partly by the Film Corporation of Western Australia. It was filmed throughout New South Wales in Canbelego, Cobar, its surroundings and Sydney.

== Reviews ==
Bill Halliwell, (Note: Not to be confused with the notable reviewer Leslie Halliwell.) who mis-identifies the director as John Clarke, calls this a "hackneyed farrago which . . . runs out of gas long before the end. Like drive-in theatres this sort of film is a thing of the past." Tony Harrison calls it a tiresome and predictable dud. Rob Finkelman, writing in Street Muscle over 30 years later, acknowledges the poor (apart from Cullen's) acting, novice camera work, crude editing and continuity errors, but loved the film for its pace, story, and the "truly excellent cars and automotive action" involved.

== Box office ==
Running on Empty grossed $1,218,000 at the box office in Australia.

== See also ==
- Cinema of Australia
