= Pauline Chan (Australian actress) =

Actress, director, Screenwriter, Producer

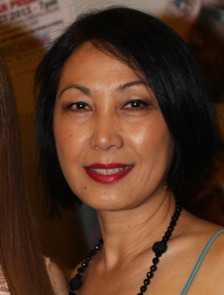
- Chan in 2011
- Born: 1956 (age 69–70); Vietnam
- Occupations: Actress, director, screenwriter, producer
- Years active: 1987–present

Pauline Chan (Chinese: 陳寶玲; pinyin: Chén Bǎolíng, Vietnamese: Trần Bảo Lính; born 1956) is an Australian actress, director, screenwriter and producer.

== Early life ==
Born and raised 16 years in Vietnam, Pauline Chan was sent to Hong Kong during the Vietnam War. She is of Chinese descent. Chan attended high school, enrolled in drama school, and worked as an actress in Hong Kong. Later, she traveled to the United States and studied film at the University of California, Los Angeles. In 1980, Pauline Chan moved to Sydney, Australia.

== Career ==
Pauline Chan made her acting debut in the 1987 George Miller produced Australian TV miniseries Vietnam. Chan also appeared alongside Nicole Kidman, Hugo Weaving and Denholm Elliott in the 1989 TV miniseries Bangkok Hilton.

Chan's short film Dusty Hearts won the Special Mention Award in the Short Film category. at the 1991 Torino International Festival of Young Cinema.

In 1994 Pauline Chan wrote and directed the film Traps. She also directed, wrote and produced the 2011 film 33 Postcards.

Chan is set to direct the upcoming crime thriller Neponset Circle starring Guy Pearce and Jeffrey Dean Morgan.

== Filmography ==
=== As actress ===
- 1986 Sword of Honour
- 1987 Vietnam TV miniseries
- 1989 The Flying Doctors TV series
- 1989 Simon Templar – Fear in Fun Park TV series
- 1989 Bangkok Hilton TV miniseries
- 1989 Cassidy TV miniseries
- 1991 G.P. TV series
- 1992 The Girl from Tomorrow TV series
- 1996 Little White Lies
- 1997 Paradise Road
- 1998 The Sugar Factory

=== As director ===
- 1989 The Space Between the Door and the Floor
- 1990 Hang Up
- 1991 Dusty Hearts
- 1994 Traps (also writer)
- 1996 Little White Lies
- 2002 Journey to Mongolia
- 2003 Tears and Fairytales
- 2011 33 Postcards
- 2024 My Eyes (film)

=== As producer ===
- 1997 The Sugar Factory (feature film, company co-director)
- 2002 Rush Hour 2 (feature film, production manager)
- 2002 Journey to Mongolia (documentary)
- 2003 Tears and Fairytales (documentary)
- 2003 Belly of the Beast (feature film, associate producer)
- 2006 Ultraviolet (feature film, producer)
- 2009 The Last Dragon – Search for the Last Pearl
- 2011 33 Postcards (feature film, producer and writer)
- 2017 Butterflies Across the Sea (TV series, producer)
- 2018 The Gateway (feature film, executive producer)
