= Singapore Sling: Road to Mandalay =

- Written by: Keith Aberdein
- Directed by: John Laing
- Starring: John Waters
- Music by: Mario Millo
- Country of origin: Australia
- Original language: English

Production
- Producers: Paul Barron; Julie Monton
- Cinematography: Louis Irving
- Editor: Marc van Buuren
- Running time: 94 min
- Production company: Barron Films

Original release
- Network: TCN 9
- Release: 17 May 1995

Singapore Sling: Road to Mandalay is a 1995 Australian television film about a private eye in Singapore. It is a followup to Singapore Sling. John Waters stars as John Stamford who is trying to track down the killer of the daughter of a former crime boss. Also featured are Josephine Byrnes and Pat Morita.

The Age's Philippa Hawker says "The plot of The Road to Mandalay has current themes and issues — the battle for power in the new Hong Kong, the drug trade in China but they are simply pretexts, devices in a story that makes unadventurous use of the traditional figure of the gentleman private investigator." The Age's Jim Schembri says "The gets so complicated that about the 74-minute mark Stamford sits down with a casual sexual acquaintance and goes over everything for the benefit of viewers who have lost the plot." Also in the Age Dennis Pryor notes "Some viewers, no doubt, can follow these plots, the rest of us go with the flow, indulging our ignorance, confident that there will be enjoyable surprises if we don't work too hard at trying to understand." Brian Courtis in the Sunday Age writes "even though John Waters does his best, a Road To Mandalay without Dorothy Lamour, Bing Crosby and Bob Hope isn't a great deal of fun." The Sydney Morning Herald's Robin Oliver said it was better that the first film but "Unfortunately, the improvements don't add up to anything like approval." It was beaten in the ratings by both The X-Files and Prime Suspect IV.

Two more TV movies featuring John Stamford followed, Singapore Sling: Old Flames and Singapore Sling: Midnight Orchid

== Cast ==
- John Waters as John Stamford
- Josephine Byrnes as Carla Singer
- Simon Bossell as Tony
- Jemma Wilks as Lily Ho
- Michael Ironside as Steiger
- Pat Morita as Y.C. Kung
- John Howard as Conrad Wolf
- Anna Maria Monticelli as Tamara
- Barry Langrishe as Carter
- Monroe Reimers as Feroz
