= Video Smash Hits =

Australian television series

Video Smash Hits was an Australian music television show which was broadcast on the Seven Network in the early to mid-1990s. It is not to be confused with Video Hits, Network Ten's long running music video show which aired opposite Video Smash Hits on Saturday mornings. Both shows shared the same format.

== Hosts ==
Video Smash Hits featured four hosts during the run of the series: Michael Horrocks, Home and Away's Emily Symons, Toni Pearen from E Street, and A Country Practice's Kym Wilson (who replaced Symons after she left the show "in disgust").

== Merchandise ==
The popularity of the program also saw two compilation CDs released and a variety of 'Video Magazines' from 1991 to 1993 in association with the popular music magazine Smash Hits.

== See also ==
- List of Australian music television shows
