= High Country (1984 film) =

Australian movie

- Directed by: Bill Hughes
- Written by: Ian Bradley
- Produced by: Peter Herbert
- Starring: John Waters; Tom Oliver; Terry Serio; Simone Buchanan
- Cinematography: Ray Henman
- Edited by: Clifford Hayes
- Production company: PBL Productions
- Distributed by: Nine Network (TV)
- Release date: March 18, 1984
- Running time: 91 mins
- Country: Australia
- Language: English

High Country is a 1984 Australian film about a former cattleman who returns to the mountains to save his racehorse. The film stars John Waters and Simone Buchanan and was braodcast by the Nine Network. It was produced by PBL Productions and filmed in 1983 with a budget of nearly one million dollars.

Ben Lomax has leased a racehorse to Frank Stacey. He learns Stacey plans to run it in a race where it is expected to break down, betting heavily against it. Lomax returns to the mountains and steals the horse.

== Cast ==
- John Waters as Ben Lomax
- Tom Oliver as Frank Stacey
- Terry Serio as Dave Baxter
- Simone Buchanan as Debbie Lomax
- Tim Hughes as Sid Nelson
- Rod Williams as Anderson
- Robin Bowering as Lachlan Corbett
- Maureen Edwards as Ella Corbett
- Brett Climo as Alex Corbett

== Reception ==
The Sun-Herald's Jacqueline Lee Lewes writes "Pleasent to look at, not badly acted but no plot to speak of. That just about sums up High Country"." Bernard Hemingway from cinephilia gave it 2 stars and said "Although unsubtle in every respect, within its populist parameters it is adequate enough and the spectacular setting of the Merrijig region of the Snowy Mountains considerably mollifies the otherwise heavy hand of the film."
