= Brides of Christ =

- DVD cover
- Genre: Drama
- Created by: Penny Chapman
- Written by: John Alsop; Sue Smith
- Directed by: Ken Cameron
- Starring: Brenda Fricker; Sandy Gore; Josephine Byrnes; Lisa Hensley; Naomi Watts; Kym Wilson
- Composer: Mario Millo
- Country of origin: Australia
- Original language: English
- No. of series: 1
- No. of episodes: 6

Production
- Executive producers: Penny Chapman; Liam Miller
- Producer: Sue Masters
- Cinematography: James Bartle
- Editor: Tony Kavanagh
- Running time: 55 min

Original release
- Network: ABC
- Release: 4 September – 9 October 1991

Brides of Christ is an Australian television miniseries produced by the Australian Broadcasting Corporation in 1991.

The series takes place behind the walls of a Sydney convent school and deals with the struggles of both the Roman Catholic nuns and the young students to adapt to the many social changes taking place within the church and the outside world during the 1960s.

== Plot ==
Diane Markham (Josephine Byrnes) joins a convent, 'Santu Spiritu School for Girls' after dropping her fiancé and becomes 'Sister Catherine', under the guidance of 'Sister Agnes' (Brenda Fricker). Catherine begins a friendship with another convent newcomer 'Sister Paul' (Lisa Hensley) and she begins to teach English and acts as the school newspaper adviser. Rosemary (Kym Wilson) is a naughty, rebellious student who gets herself into trouble, while another student Frances (Naomi Watts) is upset because her divorced mother is planning a wedding (Eventually, Sister Paul attends the civil ceremony, and dances the Twist at the celebration). Catherine and Paul help Frances overcome her depression. Sister Paul falls in love with an ultra-liberal priest (Simon Burke) while another priest struggles with the papal doctrine while the real-life of the Vietnam war, rock 'n' roll, free abortions and free love flood the news.

== Cast ==
The Nuns
Mother Ambrose	Sandy Gore
Sister Agnes	Brenda Fricker
Sister Catherine/Diane	Josephine Byrnes
Sister Paul/Veronica	Lisa Hensley
Sister Attracta	Melissa Jaffer
Sister Patrick	Penny Stehli
Sister Polycarp	Joy Hruby
Sister Philomena	Caroline Gillmer
Sister Clare	Beth Champion
Sister Francine	Michelle Pettigrove
The Girls
Frances Heffernan	Naomi Watts
Rosemary Fitzgerald	Kym Wilson
Bridget Maloney	Melissa Thomas
Bernadette	Pippa Grandison
Caroline	Kirsty McGregor
Jacinta	Vanessa Collier
Other characters
Jack Delahunty	Simon Burke
Ian McGregor	Philip Quast
Mary Maloney	Pat Bishop
Dominic Maloney	Russell Crowe
Liz Heffernan	Anne Tenney
Martin Tierney	Michael Winchester
Brendan Maloney	Brian Rooney
Irish Dean	Frank Gallacher
Sean	Ned Manning
Bishop	John Frawley

== Production ==
The series cost A$6.2 million to produce, with half the budget provided by the Film Finance Corporation Australia. Six fifty-five minute episodes were made. Each episode focused on a particular story and set of characters. Some characters would appear in multiple episodes with varying levels of prominence from episode to episode. Lead characters in one episode might appear in a support role in another episode. Josephine Byrnes' character was the focus of both the first and last episodes.

In her first major role, Naomi Watts starred as Frances, one of the students. One episode also guest starred the then unknown Russell Crowe as a young man distressed about being called up for the Vietnam War.

The series was filmed on location at St Mary's Concord, Douglas Park, New South Wales, Santa Sabina College, Strathfield, New South Wales, St Scholastica's College, Glebe, New South Wales, Carcoar, New South Wales and Australian Catholic University, Mount St Mary Campus, Strathfield, NSW and some interior scenes were filmed on location at Saint Ignatius' College, Riverview, New South Wales.

== Reception ==
Brides of Christ earned a rating of 30 in its first run, making it the most viewed drama ever produced by ABC. The series continued to garner high ratings in its subsequent re-runs. When broadcast in the United Kingdom by Channel 4, it attracted an estimated audience of 6 million, a considerable success by the channel's standards. When A&E ran the series in North America, in 1993, it drew in an estimated average of 1.76 million viewers. The entire series has since been released on DVD, and as at December 2021, it is available on Australian streaming service STAN.

Tony Scott of Variety stated a serious attempt, if not riveting one, to explore a special world.

The series won the following awards:

- 1991 Human Rights and Equal Opportunity Commission TV Drama Award was presented to the ABC TV and accepted by Penny Chapman and Sue Masters (Executive Producers)
- 1992 Logie Awards the show and cast won several awards:

- Most Popular Telemovie or Mini-Series
- Most Popular Actress in a Telemovie or Mini-Series to Josephine Byrnes
- Most Popular New Talent to Kym Wilson (along with her work on A Country Practice)
- Most Outstanding Actress to Josephine Byrnes
- Most Outstanding Telemovie or Mini-Series
