= Kiet Lam =

Australian actor

- Born: ~1975; Vietnam
- Occupation: Actor
- Notable work: Traps

Kiet Lam is a Vietnamese born Australian actor. For his performance in Traps he was nominated for the 1994 Australian Film Institute Award for Best Actor in a Supporting Role. He previously appeared in the TV miniseries Which Way Home in a role that echoes his own experience of fleeing Vietnam as a refugee in 1981.
