= McLeod's Daughters (film) =

- Title card
- Written by: Posie Graeme-Evans; Caroline Stanton; Ro Hume
- Directed by: Michael Offer
- Starring: Jack Thompson; Kym Wilson; Tammy MacIntosh
- Music by: Guy Gross
- Country of origin: Australia
- Original language: English

Production
- Producers: Andrew Blaxland; Posie Graeme-Evans; Kris Nobel; Perry Stapleton
- Editor: Edward McQueen-Mason
- Running time: 94 minutes

Original release
- Release: 11 May 1996

McLeod's Daughters is a 1996 Australian television film, it aired on the Nine Network on 11 May 1996, which was Mother's Day. It remains the highest-rated telemovie of all time in Australia. The movie serves as a backdoor pilot for the subsequent McLeod's Daughters television series.

== Synopsis ==
Following the death of her mother, Tess Silverman travels to Drovers Run, a rural cattle property in South Australia, and the farm where she spent the first few years of her life. She intends to make her visit a short one and move on to Venice to continue on with her life. Once there she endeavours to reconnect with her only remaining family, her father Jack McLeod and her half-sister Claire, whom she has not seen in 20 years, since her mother left Jack and moved to the city, and taking Tess with her. Tess arrives in a complex situation and finds herself meeting an adoring father but a hostile sister whom she no longer knows and who resents her sudden arrival and even quicker ability to win over Jack, something she feels that she has never completely been able to accomplish.

The unexpected accidental death of their father forces the sisters to overcome their differences and the many obstacles before them to realise their father's dream of running Drovers Run together. To complicate matters, Tess begins to take drastic action to alleviate the property's debts, including firing stockmen, and organising an all female muster of cattle for sale. Her actions alienate her sister's fiancé, putting strain on their engagement and forcing Claire to begin re-evaluating her own future plans. Despite problems with the local bank and the temporary loss of their prized bull, things turn out well in the end as the sisters learn to work together and are able to refinance their father's loans, thus saving the property.

== Cast ==
- Jack Thompson as Jack McLeod
- Kym Wilson as Tess Silverman McLeod
- Tammy MacIntosh as Claire McLeod
- Kris McQuade as Meg
- Mercia Deane-Johns as Rosa Wilcox
- Simone Kessell as Jodi Wilcox
- Maya Stange as Becky Howard
- Robert Mammone as Patrick
- Kevin Smith as Rod
- John Walton as Terry Wilcox
- Patrick Rees as Noddy Barlow
- Grant Piro as Steve Creeley
- Audine Leith as Dottie Prendergast
- Roger Newcombe as Clem Prendergast
- Denis Nobel as Neville Grady
- Jo Peoples as Freddy
- Gary Heath as Stockman #1
- Gary Tielen as Stockman #2
- Philip Keen as Auctioneer
- Thomas Penna as Calm Operator

== Production ==
Creator and Executive Producer Posie Graeme-Evans had the idea for the creating the show as far back as 1992. She was reading a magazine and saw a picture of a group of Australian cowgirls leaning over a farm gate, with big hats and wide grins. Evans immediately thought of a group of women running a cattle station.

The movie went into production in 1995 and was shot over 1995–1996 in and around Adelaide. Evans needed to find a location that was in reach of a major city, and it was hard to do outside of Sydney and Melbourne. She looked at doing it in Queensland, but she didn't know Queensland well as she knew South Australia. She eventually located a government owned farm which was empty, so the production was moved in and it was treated as a backlot.

== Reception ==
The movie aired on the Nine Network on Mother's Day 1996 and it became the highest rated telemovie of all time in Australia.

In 1997 cinematographer David Foreman won the Award of Distinction award for the best Telefeatures, TV Drama & Mini Series by the Australian Cinematographers Society.

== Home releases ==
The Region 1 DVD.

The first ever release was included in the season one boxset in Australia. It was also included in the U.S. season one boxset, released by Koch Entertainment (now E1 Entertainment). On 8 December 2009, E1 Entertainment released the movie separate on region 1 with extras including: the first two episodes of season one. Also released on Region 2 in Germany under the title McLeod's Töchter.

== Television series ==
Despite the success of the movie, Nine decided not to pick it up for a series as they thought a female driven drama would not appeal to audiences. Initially, following further negotiations, Nine agreed to commission three more telemovies, before eventually ordering a season of 13 (later renegotiated to 22) episodes. Initially, the film served as a pilot with the first season to follow soon after. However, as the series was not picked up until some years later, the decision was made to go back to basics for episode one of the series. The series eventually went into production from late 2000 to early 2001 and premiered on the Nine Network on 8 August 2001. The series soon became one of Australia's most successful and was popular around the world; running eight seasons and 244 episodes between 2001 and 2009 on the Nine Network.

Several casting changes occurred, such as with the main characters of Claire, now played by Lisa Chappell and Tess, now played by Bridie Carter. Sonia Todd as Meg Fountain, Rachael Carpani as Jodi Fountain, and Jessica Napier as Becky Howard, were also recast. Other new characters, who did not appear in the film, include brothers Alex Ryan (played by Aaron Jeffery) and Nick Ryan (played by Myles Pollard).
