= Singapore Sling: Midnight Orchid =

- Based on: an idea by Bevan Lee
- Written by: David Phillips
- Directed by: Geoffrey Nottage
- Starring: John Waters
- Music by: Mario Millo
- Country of origin: Australia
- Original language: English

Production
- Producers: Paul Barron; Julie Monton
- Cinematography: Martin McGrath
- Editor: Marc van Buuren
- Running time: 95 min
- Production company: Barron Films

Original release
- Network: TCN 9
- Release: 14 June 1995

Singapore Sling: Midnight Orchid is a 1995 Australian television film about a private eye in Singapore. It is a followup to Singapore Sling and Singapore Sling: Road to Mandalay. John Waters stars as John Stamford who is investigating the poisoning of a table of guests at a wedding. Also featured are Josephine Byrnes and Anthony Valentine.

Doug Anderson's capsual review in the Sydney Morning Herald said "More your bite-sized tele-drama but one with a rather nasty aftertaste". Brian Courtis in the Sunday Age writes "Trying to work out the storylines for any of Paul Barron's Singapore Sling telemovies has been a little like trying to complete a crossword with half the clues missing" The Age's Simon Hughes criticised the characterisations and writes says "the plot (as you may imagine) is incidental. This is wine cooler parading as a cocktail."

One more TV movies featuring John Stamford followed, Singapore Sling: Old Flames.

== Cast ==
- John Waters as John Stamford
- Josephine Byrnes as Carla Singer
- Simon Bossell as Tony
- Jemma Wilks as Lily Ho
- Khym Lam as Theresa Liu
- John O'Brien as Michael Liu
- Anthony Valentine as Morgan
- Anthony Brandon Wong as Yvette
- Theresa Wong as Lucy Choy
- Monroe Reimers as Feroz
