= Film and television financing in Australia =

Film and TV financing in Australia refers to government assistance to TV and cinema in Australia. Over the past 30 years, government assistance has involved a mixture of government support, distributor/ broadcaster involvement and private investment. To a significant extent, government policies have shaped the form and scale of financing.

Since 1995/96, 25-30% of funding for [Australian feature films (local films and co-productions) has come from government sources. This was mainly from Film Finance Corporation Australia (FFCA), until 2008 when the FFCA merged with the Australian Film Commission and Film Australia to become Screen Australia. However, this group includes a number of films, such as Moulin Rouge (2001) and Happy Feet (2006), that were substantially financed by Hollywood studios. For independent Australian films, the proportion of government support is much higher.

Meanwhile, TV drama has received about half of its financing from the industry itself and about 15% from government sources, while foreign investment has also been significant, reaching a peak of 49% in 1999/2000.

In 2007, the Australian Government introduced the Australian Screen Production Incentive, a package of tax incentives designed to encourage private investment in Australian-produced films, television shows and documentaries.

== History of Government support ==
At a number of times since the inception of the Australian film industry, the Australian government has experimented with quota-based support models, largely without success. At the same time, direct financial support for the industry was less forthcoming. The Government of New South Wales gave minor financial assistance to a number of productions in the 1930s. In 1945 the federal government created the Australian National Film Board, with a brief to produce documentaries. It was later known as the Commonwealth Film Unit and ultimately as Film Australia.

Feature filmmaking in Australia, however, did not receive comprehensive government support until the 1970s.

=== 1970s ===
During the 1970s, most Australian features were funded by the Australian Film Commission (established 1975) and its state government counterparts.

John Gorton was Prime Minister of Australia from 1968 to 1971 and initiated several avenues of Government support for film and the arts, establishing the Australian Council for the Arts, the Australian Film Development Corporation and the National Film and Television Training School. Prime Minister Gough Whitlam continued to support Australian film. The South Australian Film Corporation was established in 1972 to promote and produce films, while the Australian Film Commission was created in 1975 to fund and produce internationally competitive films.

=== 1980s ===
In the 1980s, private financing increased as a result of tax incentives for Australian-made film and television productions. Division 10BA (1981) of the Income Tax Assessment Act 1936 allowed investors a 150% tax concession on their investment at risk. 10B (1978) applied to a wider selection of project categories, and offered a concession spread over two financial years once the project was generating income. These concessions were whittled away throughout the 1980s, as the government became anxious about lost taxation revenue. By 1989, 10BA had become a flat 100% write-off.

=== 1990s ===
During the 1990s, direct government support once again became the dominant source of feature film funding. The FFCA, established in 1988/89, became the main instrument of this support. It has funded 1,079 projects since then, to a budget value of $2.58 billion. Projects certified under 10BA were also eligible for direct investment from the FFCA, while 10B projects were not.

=== Recent developments ===
The Australian Film Commission (AFC), once the government's main vehicle for production funding, was now focussed primarily on development, marketing and research activities. Recently proposed legislation has united the AFC and FFCA, along with Film Australia, in a new entity, which is now known as "Screen Australia."

Another recent support mechanism was the Film Licensed Investment Company (FLIC) scheme. Each FLIC would invest in a slate of Australian-made productions, thus spreading the risk across a portfolio. Investors who bought shares in a FLIC would receive a 100% tax concession. The FLIC scheme was introduced in 1999 and renewed in 2005, but no further licences will be granted due to the introduction of the Producer Offset in 2007 (see below).

A refundable film tax offset (RFTO), designed to attract large-budget overseas productions to shoot in Australia, was introduced in 2001. It covered feature films, mini-series, telemovies and TV series. It is to be superseded by the new Location Offset (see below).

== State agencies ==
The state agencies, listed by their titles as of 2022, are:

- Screen Canberra (Australian Capital Territory)
- Screen NSW
- Screen Queensland
- Screen Tasmania
- Screen Territory (Northern Territory)
- Screenwest, WA Regional Film Fund
- South Australian Film Corporation
- VicScreen

== Australian Screen Production Incentive ==
The Australian Screen Production Incentive was introduced in 2007 to replace all the previous schemes. The key elements of the scheme include:

The Producer Offset of 40% of “qualifying Australian production expenditure” for the production of Australian feature films, and 30% for television productions (projects may include series, telemovies, mini-series and documentaries). Qualifying Australian production expenditure (QAPE) covers expenditure made on goods or services provided in Australia, or provided overseas by Australian residents.

QAPE on ‘above the line’ costs (development costs and fees paid to key cast and creative personnel) will be capped at 20% of the production budget. On 14 May 2024, the Australian Government announced it will remove the 20% above the line cap from the Producer Offset.

To be eligible for the producer offset, feature films require a guaranteed cinema release and QAPE in excess of $1m. Minimum QAPE for documentaries is $250,000 per hour (no minimum total spend), television series $1 million (and $500,000 per hour), telemovies $1 million (and $800,000 per hour) and short form animation $250,000 (and $250,000 per quarter-hour). Drama series that spend at least $35 million per season in QAPE are not subject to the per hour minimum QAPE requirement of $500,000. Screen Australia took over the certification process from the FFCA in July 2008.

A Location Offset of 30% offset for all eligible productions (including feature films, telemovies, and television mini-series and series) that spend at least $20 million and $1.5 million per hour for television series in qualifying Australian production expenditure.

A Post, Digital and Visual (PDV) offset of 30% is available for PDV projects that spend at least $500,000 in qualifying PDV production spent in Australia, whether or not the production is shot in Australia. This offset can be used an alternative to, but not in conjunction with, the location offset. The Office for the Arts administers the location and PDV offsets.

== Private investment ==
Private investment in the Australian screen content industry peaked in 2001/02 and 2002/03, mainly as a result of the pilot Film Licensed Investment Company (FLIC) scheme. The 2004/05 year saw a further peak, owing to the production of the Australian feature film Jindabyne, which was majority funded by private investors.

Financing from overseas sources has supported a number of feature films with internationally known Australian directors. Examples include George Miller’s Happy Feet (financed by Warner Bros.) and Babe: Pig in the City (Universal Studios), Baz Luhrmann’s Moulin Rouge! (Fox), and European-financed films such as Rolf de Heer’s Dance Me to My Song (Italy) and Paul Cox’s Innocence (Netherlands).

== Co-productions ==
The Australian Government has co-production agreements with nine countries. Official co-productions are eligible for nationally available benefits or programs of assistance. In Australia, this has included the 10B and 10BA schemes, the 12.5% Refundable Film Tax Offset (RFTO) and FFCA funding.

Australian feature film co-productions have increased from 13 in the 1990s to 14 between July 2000 and July 2006. The most common partners for Australian feature films have been (in descending order) the United Kingdom, Canada, France and New Zealand. In television drama, the main partners have been Canada, the United Kingdom, the United States and France.

Unofficial co-productions are not eligible for the same benefits as official co-productions. Examples include Crocodile Dundee in Los Angeles and Farscape, are both unofficial Australian/US co-productions.

== See also ==
General information

- Filmmaking
- Film finance

About Australia

- History of the Australian Broadcasting Corporation
- Screen Producers Association
- List of Australian films
- Cinema of Australia
