= Shadows of the Heart =

- Written by: Deborah Cox
- Directed by: Rod Hardy
- Starring: Josephine Byrnes; Marcus Graham; Jerome Ehlers
- Theme music composer: David Hirschfelder
- Country of origin: Australia
- Original language: English
- No. of episodes: 2

Production
- Producer: Jan Marnell
- Cinematography: David Foreman
- Editor: Denise Haratzis

Original release
- Network: Network Ten
- Release: 9 October – 10 October 1990

Shadows of the Heart is a two-part 1990 Australian television mini-series directed by Rod Hardy and starring Josephine Byrnes. The story was based on the life and biography of Dr Joy Seager who was the only doctor on Kangaroo Island in 1925. She published her biography as Kangaroo Island Doctor in 1980.

== Plot ==
A female doctor, Kate Munro moves to (fictitious) Gannet Island off the South Australian coast in 1927. Conflict between traditional religious values and modern scientific medicine ensues as she forms a relationship with two men who are brothers, one a grazier and one a priest.

== Cast ==
- Josephine Byrnes as Dr. Kate Munro
- Jerome Ehlers as Father Michael Hanlon
- Marcus Graham as Vic Hanlon
- Jason Donovan as Alex Fargo
- Robyn Nevin as Mrs. Hanlon
- Barry Otto as Charles Munro
- Harold Hopkins as Willy Carter
- Nadine Garner as Lanty Fargo
- Michael Caton as Frank Barrett
- Colleen Hewett as Emily Fargo
- Annie Byron as Rose Flanagan
- Lisa Hensley as Jillian Hughes
- William McInnes as Denny Taylor
- Edwin Hodgeman as Edward Bennett
- Kelly Dingwall as Andy Keegan
- Syd Brisbane as Johnny

== Production ==
Shadows of the Heart was shot between 22 January and 17 March 1990 on Kangaroo Island, and in the old butter factory at Milang, both in the state of South Australia. Joy Seager died in 1991.

== Nominations and awards ==
The series was nominated in the Best Miniseries or Telefeature category in the 1991 Australian Film Institute Awards, and Josephine Byrnes was nominated for Best Lead Actress in a Television Drama.
