= Which Way Home (miniseries) =

- Genre: mini-series
- Written by: Michael Laurence
- Directed by: Carl Schultz
- Starring: Cybill Shepherd; John Waters; Peta Toppano
- Countries of origin: Australia; United States
- Original language: English
- No. of episodes: 2

Production
- Producer: Hal McElroy
- Running time: 2 x 90 mins
- Production companies: Southern Star Entertainment; Turner Pictures

Original release
- Network: Network Ten
- Release: 28 January 1991 – 1991

Which Way Home is a 1991 mini series about a nurse who flees Cambodia with seven orphans. It stars Cybill Shepherd and John Waters.

== Cast ==
- Cybill Shepherd as Karen Parsons
- John Waters as Steve Hannah
- Peta Toppano as Annie
- John Ewart as Ferguson
- Ruben Santiago-Hudson as Jim Waters
- Marc Gray as Billy
- Andy Tran as Quan
- Adrian Kwan as Khai
- Kiet Lam as Haing Sopral
- Mark Ngo as Narun Sopral
- Alina Kwan as Suthy Sopral
- Anna Ngo as Bopha Sopral
- Thuy Le Kim as Lien
- Ken Blackburn as Officer Carmody

== Reception ==
Writing in the Sydney Morning Herald Robin Oliver begins "HERE's a solid, adventure-packed tear-jerker, built on simple foundations, which, if it has a fault, too obviously sets disaster on disaster, tragedy on tragedy, before reaching the ending we all demand."
