= Official film and television co-production in Australia =

An international film or television co-production is a production made by production companies in different countries. This note focuses on ‘official’ Australian co-productions, that is, co-productions that meet the requirements for benefits under the Australian Official Co-Production Program. It looks at trends in production, the potential impact of recent changes to film funding, and what lies ahead for Australia's involvement in co-production.

== Official co-production in Australia ==
Official co-productions are made possible by formal agreements between countries. For filmmakers, the key attraction of a treaty co-production is that it qualifies as a national production in each of the partner nations. Thus, it can access benefits that are available to the local film and television industry in more than one country. Benefits may include government subsidies, tax concessions and inclusion in domestic television broadcast quotas.

The Australian government has signed official film co-production agreements with the United Kingdom, Canada, Italy, Ireland, Israel, Germany, China and, most recently, Singapore (as treaties); and France and New Zealand (as memoranda of understanding or MOUs. Official co-production agreements set the criteria that a production must meet in order to be considered an official co-production. Criteria may cover co-financing, creative participation and copyright ownership.

International co-productions also occur outside the framework of official co-productions, either with countries that do not have an agreement with Australia, or as projects that do not satisfy official co-production criteria. Examples of the former include the Australia/US co-productions Crocodile Dundee in Los Angeles (2001) and Farscape (1999–2003).

Australian co-production agreements are administered by the Australian Film Commission (AFC) on behalf of the Australian Government. (In July 2008 the AFC will be merged with other film agencies to become Screen Australia; the new organisation will then have oversight over co-productions.) The overriding objective is to maintain an overall balance between the creative and financial contributions of each country over time. Accordingly, there is some discretion in granting co-production status to an individual co-production if there is an imbalance between financial and creative contributions.

The AFC's International Co-production Program Guidelines set out eligibility conditions for the granting of co-production status. These relate to the authorship of the underlying works and screenplays, co-producer participation, sources of finance, control over copyright; and the engagement of key creative participants. Co-productions are restricted to particular genres: feature films, drama series, miniseries, documentaries and telemovies. At the level of the individual production there must be a producer from each of the partner countries, a minimum level of Australian equity in the project (20 to 30 per cent) and matching participation by Australian creative components.

A points system is used to ensure a balance between the Australian budget contribution and the participation of key personnel (creative and crew). Points are attached to key creative positions including director, writer, editor and key cast. By amassing a minimum number of points, a production can qualify as ‘Australian’. In this context the participation of Australian financial and creative resources acts as a proxy for ‘Australian content’. Different points systems apply to the production of live action drama, documentary and animation, reflecting the importance of particular roles specific to each genre.

== Australia’s engagement in international co-productions ==
Australia was a relatively late entrant into the sphere of official co-production. Its first agreement was signed with France in 1986. France itself entered into a co-production agreement with Italy in 1949 while Canada, a leading co-production country, entered its first agreement in 1963 and now has agreements with 53 other countries.

As of April 2007, Australia had engaged in 96 official co-productions that were either completed or in production. Feature films and television drama are the production types most likely to be co-productions: they total 35 and 21 productions respectively, with total budgeted costs of A$385.15 million and A$294.71 million. Australia has partnered most frequently with Canada and the United Kingdom. Australia and Canada have produced 31 co-productions with budgets totalling A$347 million and Australia and the United Kingdom have co-produced 30 productions, with budgets of A$323.43 million.

Australia's official co-production record is modest by international standards. In 2005–2006 Australia engaged in 10 co-productions with total budgets of $60 million and an Australian spend of $35m. Canada, by comparison, had 58 co-productions in 2006 with total budgets in excess of C$404 million and a Canadian share of C$166 million. In the same year, the United Kingdom had 57 productions with total budgets of £124.8 million.

Further, co-productions represent a small proportion of the Australian industry. In 2005–2006, 32 feature films were made in Australia. Of these, four were foreign and only three were co-productions. Domestic expenditure for local films was A$97 million and for foreign films was A$23 million, while co-productions totalled a modest A$13 million. Similarly, local television drama in the six years to 2005–2006 had an average annual spend of A$202 million, while foreign drama and co-productions amounted to A$37 million apiece.

Although co-productions contributed only a small proportion of total production budgets in Australia, individual co-productions tend to have higher budgets. Of the 35 co-produced feature films, 49 per cent had budgets in excess of $10m. By comparison, only 18% of all Australian-produced features between 1988/89 and 2005/06 reached this level. Mini-series showed a similar bias: 90% of co-productions had budgets between $6 and $20m compared with just 61% of all series over the same period.

Co-production is a more common production mode for children's television drama. In the six years to 2005/06, the Australian industry averaged 96 hours of co-produced TV drama, at budgets of $61.8m. Of this, 27 hours were dedicated to children's drama, at average annual budgets of $16.1m. The higher reliance on co-production for children's content stems from the difficulty of financing children's programs, and the ability of children's animation to translate easily into different cultures.

While the trend through the 1990s was for a greater total spend in Australia for co-productions, reaching a high of $111m in 2001/2002, the trend since then has been downward, with only $36m being spent in 2005/06. This is largely due to a fall in television drama co-production from a high of $83m in 2001/02 to just $23m in 2005/06. Feature films, on the other hand, have experienced a revival from 2000/01, but have only averaged a modest $22.2m in Australian spend in the six years from 2001/02.

== The future of co-production in Australia ==
A number of economic, industry and cultural factors influence decisions to undertake an official co-production. These factors include the value of the Australian dollar, the availability of skilled crews, access to tax offsets and other financial incentives, the generation of creative content and the signing of further bilateral agreements. Higher production budgets, falling television licence fees and lower distribution guarantees are all factors that will continue to drive the international demand for co-productions. As discussed by Hoskins, McFadyen, & Finn, Australian producers find financial pooling the most important benefit of co-production and it is likely that this will be pursued more vigorously in the future.

The recently introduced Producer Offset is also expected to drive a higher level of co-production. Australian production companies making official co-productions will be automatically entitled to a tax offset of 40% of qualifying Australian production expenditure (QAPE) for feature films and 20% of QAPE for documentary, television series, telemovies and short animation.

An increase in the number of countries with which Australia has co-production agreements may also encourage greater levels of co-production. Australia recently entered into agreements with China and Singapore, increasing the number of agreements to 11. Further, Australia has signed agreements with a number of European countries which are parties to the European Convention on Cinematographic Co-production. Indirectly, this convention may provide further opportunities for collaboration with other European Union countries.

Noting the favourable performance results for Australian co-productions, Hoskins, McFadyen and Finn advocate 'greater government initiative in treaty negotiation and increased official openness to international co-production'. As the Australian film financing landscape shifts over the coming period, there is every chance that these policy issues will provide the grist for further discussions. At the same time, we can expect that Australian producers and their international partners will seek out innovative ways to harness the benefits of co-production, particularly in light of the new tax regime.
