= My Eyes (film) =

2024 Australian film

New Eyes
- Promotional movie poster for the film
- Directed by: Pauline Chan; Angela How
- Written by: Tsu Shan Chambers, Ade Djajamihardja, Angela How
- Produced by: Judi Levine; Roxana McMallan
- Distributed by: Wise Goat Productions
- Release dates: November 2024 (Mar del Plata); May 2025
- Running time: 88 minutes
- Country: Australia
- Languages: English; Spanish language; Spanish]]

New Eyes is a 2024 Australian film directed by starring. It is inspired by true events and starring Adam Garcia, Tsu Shan Chambers, Kieu Chinh and two-time Paralympic Judo champion Eduardo Ávila Sánchez. The film made its Australian premiere in May 2025.

Dami Im released "My Favourite Scar" for the film, which was released in May 2025.

The film represented Australia at the 69th Asia Pacific Festival in Macau.

== Synopsis ==
Optometrist Alana discovers her daughter has a rare inherited eye disease. A judo athlete with a vision impairment halfway across the world may hold the answers she is searching for, but old truths threaten to derail the mission and Alana's marriage.

== Cast ==
- Tsu Shan Chambers – Alana
- Adam Garcia – Sam
- Eduardo Ávila Sánchez – Nico
- Nia Rush – Sam
- Kieu Chinh – Mrs. Cheong
