= John Waters (actor) =

Australian actor (born 1948)

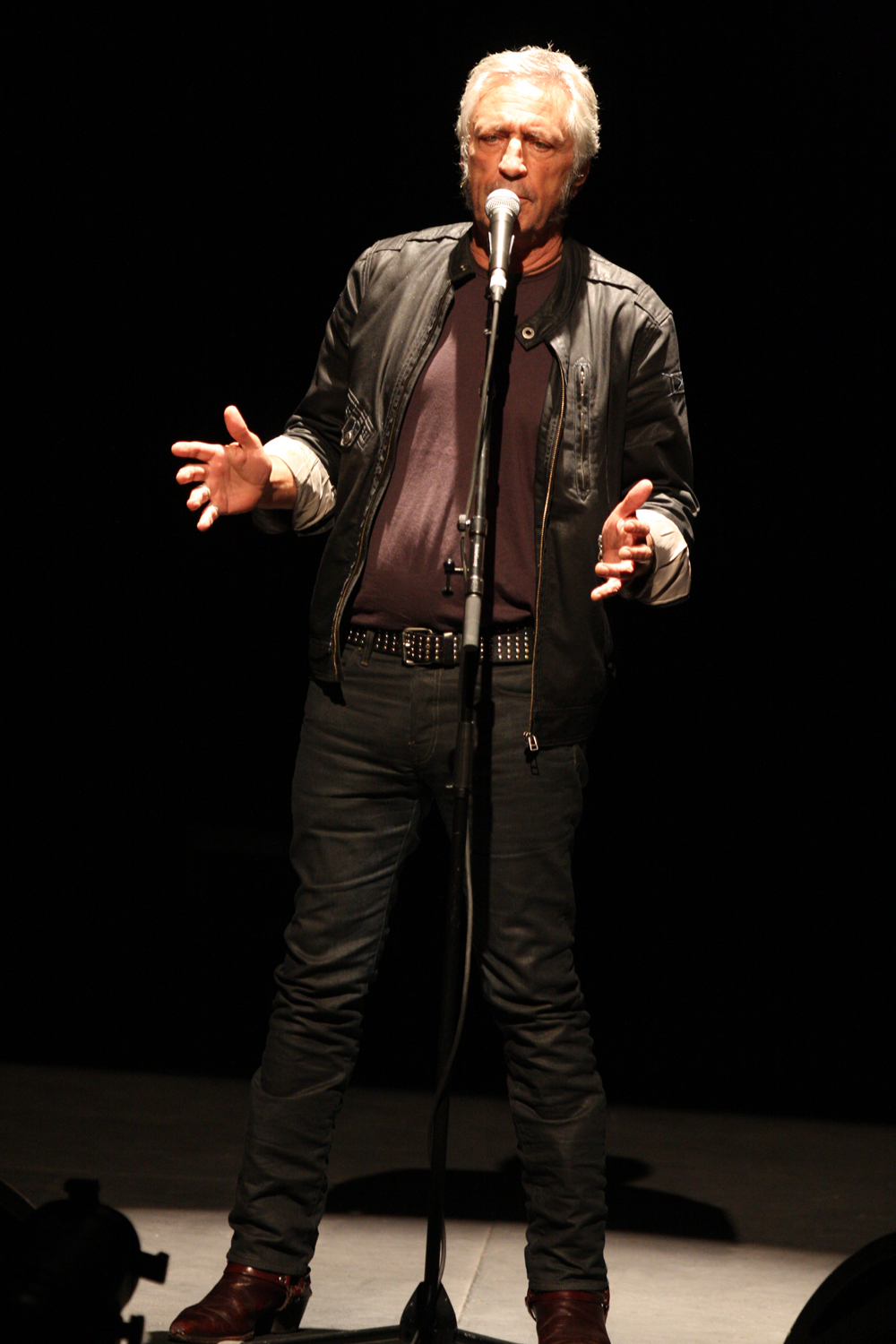
- John Waters on stage in 2012
- Born: John Russell Waters; 8 December 1948 (age 77); London, England
- Occupations: Actor; musician; songwriter; playwright; theatre performer; TV presenter
- Musical career
- Genres: Rock; pop; blues; folk; children's music
- Instruments: Vocals; Acoustic guitar; bass guitar; electric guitar

John Waters (born 8 December 1948) is an English-born Australian film, theatre and television actor, creator, deviser, director, presenter, playwright, producer, singer, songwriter, musician, voice artist and writer.

He is the son of British actor Russell Waters. John Waters was a presenter on the Australian children's television series Play School for 18 years.

== Early life ==
Waters was born on 8 December 1948 in London, England, and grew up in Teddington.

== Career ==
=== Music ===
He first faced a live audience as a singer and bass guitar player with 1960s London-based blues band The Riots before travelling to Australia, initially for an extended working holiday and then eventually settling there permanently.

Since 1992 Waters has performed with a one-man show Looking Through a Glass Onion co-written with Stewart D'Arrietta, a tribute to John Lennon featuring Lennon's music, words and images. In addition to many Australian tours of the show he also played six months in the West End, London. In 2014 he played 120 performances at the Union Square Theatre in Manhattan.

Waters has released of CDs including The Story of Pilliga Pete and Clarrie the Cocky (2010), a family story and music CD written and narrated by Waters, Brel (2010) a live album sung in French and a tribute to the Belgian singer-songwriter Jacques Brel, the double live album, John Waters Looking Through A Glass Onion (2011) and his debut originals album Cloudland (2011).

=== Theatre ===
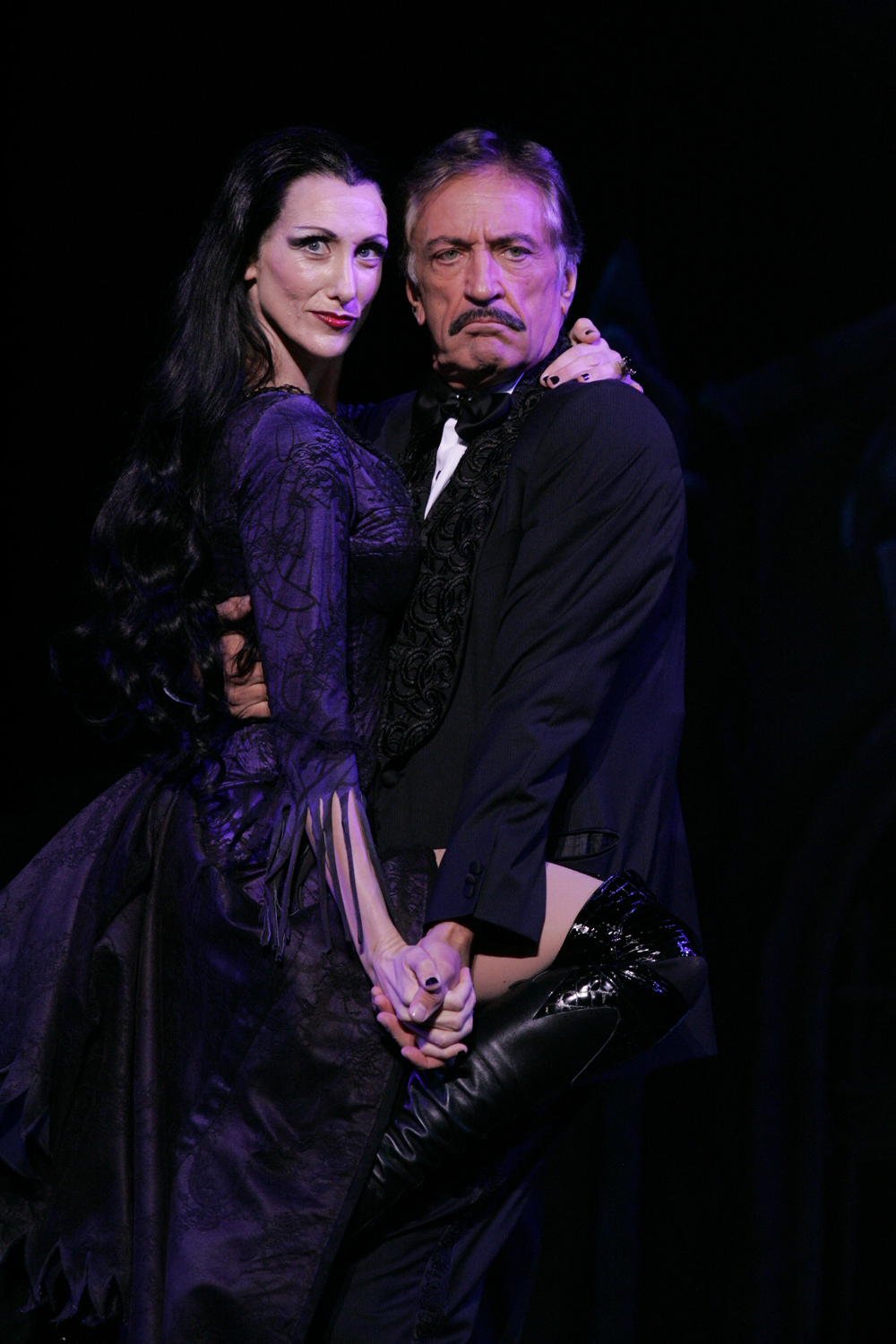
Waters in the musical The Addams Family as Gomez in 2013

He appeared in a production of Hair in 1969/1971, Godspell and Dracula.

He was in the original Australian production of They're Playing Our Song, which opened on 23 August 1980 at the Theatre Royal in Sydney. It starred Waters and Jacki Weaver, with Rhonda Burchmore as one of the Inner Voices. An Australian cast recording of the show was later released by Festival Records.

Waters appeared as Pontius Pilate in the concert version of Tim Rice musical Jesus Christ Superstar with John Farnham, Kate Ceberano, Jon Stevens and Angry Anderson in 1992

In 2005, Waters starred in David Williamson's play Influence as shock jock Ziggi Blasko. The play was performed in Sydney during March/April 2005 and in Melbourne in June/July 2005.

In 2008, he played The Narrator in Richard O'Brien's Rocky Horror Show at Star City Casino, Sydney.

In 2006–2007. Waters toured Australia, Hong Kong and New Zealand in a critically acclaimed role alongside Brett Tucker in The Woman in Black.

In 2010 he starred in the Melbourne Theatre Company's production of The Swimming Club, a play by Australian author Hannie Rayson.

In 2013, Waters starred in The Addams Family musical as Gomez Addams. The production premiered in Sydney on 24 March 2013 and closed on 9 June 2013.

In 2017, Waters played Ulysses in Music Theatre Melbourne's concert production of Paris. He had previously played the role of Agamemnon on the musical's original concept album, released in 1990.

In 2024, Waters starred in a new Australian tour of The Woman in Black as Arthur Kipps.

=== Television ===
Many Australians still remember Waters best from his nearly 20-year stint on the Australian children's series Play School, appearing from 1972 until 1991. During his tenure with Play School, he narrated various children's video trailers for ABC-TV.

Among his best known television roles is that of the brooding Sergeant Robert McKellar in the 1974–76 television series Rush (revoiced and parodied by The D-Generation as The Olden Days on their comedy program The Late Show). Waters also appeared in the 1983 Australian miniseries All the Rivers Run as Brenton Edwards.

He played Perry Luscombe in Fireflies on ABC TV, which lasted for only one season in 2004.

Waters joined the cast of All Saints in June 2006 as Mike Vlasek, the new head of surgery. He remained with the show until its cancellation in late 2009.

In 2012, Waters starred in the ABC TV mini-series The Mystery of a Hansom Cab, adapted from the novel by English writer Fergus Hume. He appeared on the Logie-award-winning television series Offspring, which completed filming its third season in 2013 and was renewed for a further two seasons.

In 2018, Waters had a recurring role, as lawyer Travis James, on the ABC TV Series Mystery Road.

=== Films ===
Waters played Capt. Alfred Taylor in the 1980 film Breaker Morant which starred British actor Edward Woodward as Harry "Breaker" Morant.

In 1982, Waters appeared in the World War II film Attack Force Z alongside Mel Gibson, John Phillip Law and Sam Neill.

In 2013, Waters starred in a local regional film production created by Luis Bayonas, called Adios.

In 1990, film critic David Stratton, referring to the films, wrote that in his opinion Waters "has been in more bad films than most other actors around".

=== Other work ===
He has starred in many television advertisements for various companies including Cinzano, Bird's Eye, Bankers Trust, MBF Health Fund, Sudafed, Uncle Tobys, Qantas, Telstra, MLC, Arnotts and Toyota Hybrid Camry. He has narrated programs such as Mind Games: Real Life Adventures, Nostradamus and Triple Zero Heroes and All Together Now.

== Awards ==
In 1975, Waters won the George Wallace Memorial Logie for Best New Talent at the Logie Awards for his role in Division 4.

In 1988, he won the AFI Award for Best Performance by an Actor in a Leading Role as character Tom Garfield in the Frank Howson-written film Boulevard of Broken Dreams.

He has been nominated for several other awards, including Best Lead Actor (in 1978 for Weekend of Shadows) and Best Supporting Actor in a Drama (in 2006 for All Saints) at the AFI Awards, and for Most Popular Actor in a Telemovie or Mini-Series (in 1992 for Which Way Home) at the Logie Awards.

=== ARIA Music Awards ===
The ARIA Music Awards is an annual awards ceremony held by the Australian Recording Industry Association. They commenced in 1987.

Year	Nominee / work	Award	Result	Ref.
1994	Looking Through a Glass Onion	Best Original Soundtrack, Cast or Show Album	Nominated	

== Personal life ==
Waters' first marriage was to actress Jenny Cullen and they had two children. His second marriage was to actress Sally Conabere. They had no children. His third marriage, to Zoe Burton, was in January 2002. They live in the Southern Highlands, NSW with their three children.

== Children's music ==
Waters supports DUETS 2012, a concert to assist The Australian Children's Music Foundation (ACMF) (founded by fellow Play School presenter Don Spencer) and Carols in the Domain 2012. He is an ambassador for The Australian Children's Music Foundation.

== Filmography ==
=== Film ===
Year	Title	Role	Notes
1976	End Play	Mark Gifford	Feature film
1976	The Haunting of Hewie Dowker	Hewie Dowker	TV movie
1976	The Rollicking Adventures of Eliza Fraser	David Bracefell	Feature film
1977	The Getting of Wisdom	Rev. Shepherd	Feature film
1977	Summerfield	David Abbott	Feature film
1977	Trial of Ned Kelly	Ned Kelly	TV movie
1978	Weekend of Shadows	Rabbit	Feature film
1978	Cass	Mike	TV movie
1978	The Scalp Merchant	Cliff Rowan	TV movie
1979	Demolition	Peter Clarke	TV movie
1979	The Prophecies of Nostradamus	Narrator	Documentary film
1980	Breaker Morant	Capt. Alfred Taylor	Feature film
1980	Bedfellows		TV movie
1980	Slippery Slide	David	TV movie
1981	Attack Force Z	Sub Lt. Ted "Kingo" Kong	Feature film
1984	High Country	Ben Lomax	TV movie
1985	I Can't Get Started	Robert	Feature film
1986	Passion Flower	Leslie Gaitland	TV movie
1987	The Last of the Mohicans	Hawkeye Bumppp (voice)	TV movie
1987	Bushfire Moon	Patrick O'Day	Feature film
1987	The Perfectionist	Stuart Gunn	Film
1987	Going Sane	Martin Brown	Film
1988	Captain Johnno	Frank	TV movie
1988	Boulevard of Broken Dreams	Tom Garfield	Feature film
1988	Grievous Bodily Harm	Morris Martin	Feature film
1990	Heaven Tonight	Johnny Dysart	TV movie
1994	Singapore Sling	John Stamford	TV movie
1994	Ebbtide	Michael Suresch	Film
1995	Singapore Sling: Road to Mandalay	John Stamford	TV movie
1995	Singapore Sling: Old Flames	John Stamford	TV movie
1995	Singapore Sling: Midnight Orchid	John Stamford	TV movie
1998	The Sugar Factory	Sam Lejeune	Film
1998	The Real Macaw	Dr. Lance Hagen	Feature film
1999	Chameleon II: Death Match	Henry Kubica	TV movie
2003	Evil Never Dies	Prof. Arkin	TV movie
2005	Stealth	Black Ops Doctor	Feature film
2005	Late Shift	Old Paul Bell	Short film
2006	The Bouncer	Dave	Feature film
2006	Carnivale Reflux	Narrator	Short film
2010	Centre Place	Jack Houghton	Feature film
2011	Ragtime	Dick	Short film
2012	The Mystery of a Hansom Cab	Mark Frettiby	TV movie
2013	Return to Nim's Island	Booker	Feature film
2013	Worm	Police Interviewer	Short film
2015	Killers and Thieves	The Fence	Short film
2016	Virtual Dogs and Loaded Guns	Bank Customer	Feature film
2016	The Faintest Clasp	Voice	Short film
2017	2:22	Bill	Feature film
2017	Three Summers	Eamon	Feature film
2020	At Last	Christopher	Feature film
2022	Blaze	Simon Baker	Feature film
2023	The Rooster	Norris	Feature film

=== Television ===
Year	Title	Role	Notes
1972	Boney	Const. Peter Lloyd	TV series
1972	Redheap	Jerry Arnold	TV series
1972–91	Playschool	Presenter	TV series
1973	Certain Women		TV series
1973	Ryan	Curt Valchek	TV series
1974	The Box	Michael Brooks	TV series; regular role
1974–1975	Division 4	Darcy Nash / Barry Fielding	TV series; 2 episodes
1975	The Seven Ages of Man		TV miniseries, 1 episode
1975	Quality of Mercy		TV series, 1 episode
1973–1976	Homicide	Eddie Hughes / Howard Nelson / Alan Guthrie	TV series; 3 episodes
1973–1976	Matlock Police	Tim Ward / Const. Cook / Johno Johnson	TV series; 3 episodes
1974–1976	Rush	Sgt. Robert McKellar	TV series
1976	The Sullivans	Chris Merchant	TV series
1978	Case for the Defence	Steve Gray	TV series
1983	Five Mile Creek	Cameron	TV series
1986	Alice to Nowhere	Johnny Parson	TV miniseries
1987	Nancy Wake	Henri Fiocca	TV miniseries
1989	Dearest Enemy		TV series (pilot only)
1983–1990	All the Rivers Run	Brenton Edwards	TV series
1991	Which Way Home	Steve Hannah	TV miniseries
1991	All Together Now	Lockie Burns	TV series
1992	Kelly	Mr. Nichols	TV series
1996	Snowy River: The McGregor Saga	Damien Winters	TV series
1997	Good Guys, Bad Guys	Oscar Drake	TV series
1997	Fallen Angels	Bob Tognetti	TV series
1999	The Lost World	Lento	TV miniseries
2000	Tales of the South Seas	Robert Frye	TV series
2002	Young Lions	Senior Det. Bill Martin	TV series
2004	Fireflies	Perry Luscombe	TV series
2006–2009	All Saints	Dr. Miklos Vlasek	TV series
2009	Triple Zero Heroes	Narrator	TV series
2010	Underbelly	John Hatton	TV series
2010	Sea Patrol	Sergeant Booker	TV series (guest star)
2010	City Homicide	William Clegg	TV series (guest star)
2010–2014	Offspring	Darcy Proudman	TV series
2014	ANZAC Girls	Col. Thomas Fiaschi	TV miniseries
2016	Rake	Edgar Thompson	TV series (fourth season)
2016	The Doctor Blake Mysteries	Bernie Thompson	TV series
2016–2018	Future-Worm!	Manchovy	TV series
2018	Mystery Road	Travis James	TV miniseries
2018	True Story with Hamish & Andy	Dr. Jeff	TV series, 1 episode
2019	The Commons	Herman	TV miniseries, 7 episodes
2020	Miss Fisher and the Crypt of Tears	Prof. Linnaeus	TV series
2020	The End	Henry	TV series, 9 episodes
2020	The Truth	Reverend Philip Brock	Podcast series
2020	Halifax: Retribution	Ryan	TV miniseries, 1 episode
2021	Doctor Doctor	Michael	TV series, 5 episodes
2022	Grey Nomads	Henry Keen	TV series, 6 episodes
2022	Darby and Joan	Ian Kirkhope / Rob Deacon	TV series, 6 episodes
2022	Mind Games: Real Life Adventures	Narrator	TV
2024	Helluva Boss	Rolando	TV series, 1 episode

== Theatre ==
source:AusStage (

Title	Year	Role	Playwright
Hair	1969/1971	Actor - as Claude	James Rado, Gerome Ragni
Big Brother Dragon	1971	as Actor	Michael Boddy
There Is Nothing More Wonderful than a Glorious Sunset	1971	as Actor	Michael Boddy
Lasseter	1971	as Actor	Reg Livermore
Jacques Brel is Alive and Well and Living in Paris	1972	as Performer	Eric Blau
Godspell	1972	as Actor	Stephen Schwartz
Two Gentlemen of Veronica	1973	as Actor - as Proteus	William Shakespeare
Caesar and Cleopatra	1977	Apollodorus	George Bernard Shaw
Dracula	1978/1979	Count Dracula	Robert Helpmann
They're Playing Our Song	1980/1981	Vernon Gersch	Neil Simon
Children of a Lesser God	1984	as Actor	Mark Medoff
My Fair Lady	1988	Henry Higgins	George Bernard Shaw
The Hunting of the Snark	1990	as Actor	Lewis Carroll
Gershwin - The Musical	1990	George Gershwin	Gregory Flood - Roslyn Flood
A Little Night Music	1990	as Actor	Hugh Wheeler
Love Letters	1992	as Actor	A.R. Gurney
Looking Through a Glass Onion	1992-1994	as Performer	John Waters - devisor
Jesus Christ Superstar	1992	Actor and Singer	Pontius Pilate
Reunion	1995	as Actor	John Waters - Writer/Director
An Ideal Husband	1998	Sir Robert Chiltern	Oscar Wilde
The Sound of Music	2000	as Captain von Trapp	
The Graduate	2001	Mr. Robinson	Charles Webb
Oliver!	2002	as Performer	Lionel Bart
Influence	2005	as Actor	David Williamson
Let It Be	2006	as Singer	
The Woman in Black	2006	as Actor	Stephen Malatratt
The White Album Concert	2007	as Singer	
The Rocky Horror Show	2008	Narator	Richard O'Brian
Tell me on a Sunday	2008	Voice-over Artist	
The Swimming Club	2010	as Actor	Hannie Rayson
Looking Through a Glass Onion/Lennon:Looking Through a Glass Onion	2010-2017	as Performer	John Waters - creator/devisor
The Addams Family	2017	as Gomez Addams	
Talk	2017	as Actor	Johnathon Biggins
Paris	2017	as Actor	David McKay
Bloom	2025	Doug	
Waitress	2026	Joe	Jessie Nelson
Fiddler on the Roof	2026	Lazar Wolf	
