= Josephine Byrnes =

Australian actress

- Born: 1966 (age 59–60)
- Occupation: Actress
- Years active: 1990–2003

Josephine Byrnes (born 1966) is an Australian former actress best known for her work in television, including a lead role in Brides of Christ for which she won a Logie Award.

== Filmography ==
=== Film ===
Year	Title	Role	Notes
1993	Frauds	Beth Wheats	
1997	Oscar and Lucinda	Miriam Chadwick	
1999	Wednesdays	Woman	Short
2001	The Man Who Sued God	Cressida Roache	
2002	Black and White	Barmaid	
2003	The Matrix Reloaded	Zion Virtual Control Operator	

=== Television ===
Year	Title	Role	Notes
1990	The Flying Doctors	Lilah	Episode: "A Place for the Night"
1990	More Winners: His Master's Ghost	Pauline Jones	TV film
1990	Shadows of the Heart	Dr. Kate Munro	TV film
1990	Half a World Away	Florence Desmond	TV film
1991	Brides of Christ	Diane / Sister Catherine	TV miniseries
1992	The Other Side of Paradise	Paula Reid	TV film
1995	Singapore Sling: Road to Mandalay	Carla	TV film
1995	Singapore Sling: Midnight Orchid	Carla	TV film
1995	Singapore Sling: Old Flames	Carla	TV film
1996	Twisted	Julia	Episode: "The Confident Man"
1996	The Man from Snowy River	Jessie McClusky	11
1996	Water Rats	Agent Carter	Episode: "V.I.P."
1997	Kangaroo Palace	Ann	TV film
1999	Thunderstone	Layla	Episode: "Broken Dreams"
2000	All Saints	Marion Lord	Episodes: "Judge Not...", "... Lest Ye Be Judged"
2000	Waiting at the Royal	Antoinette	TV film
2001	The Lost World	The Outlaw	Episode: "The Outlaw"
2001	Water Rats	Julia Goodwin	Episodes: "It Happened One Night", "High Roller", "Shadow Man"
2001–02	Ponderosa	Margaret Greene	Episodes: "Pilot: Parts 1 & 2", "Comes a Horse", "Fugitive"
