= Australian Film Festival =

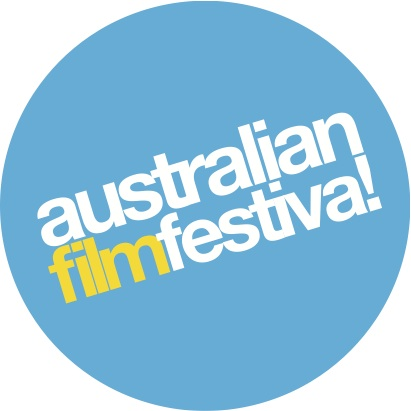
- Australian Film Festival Logo
- Genre: Film festival
- Frequency: Annually
- Locations: Sydney, Australia
- Inaugurated: 2010

The Australian Film Festival is a former annual film festival held in the city of Sydney. The festival showcased the films of Australian talent working in a variety of mediums, including; feature films, short films, television and online web content. In addition to showcasing Australian film, the festival promoted the growth and recognition of Australian cinema through industry-led workshops and discussion forums. It was known for hosting the Australian Film Walk of Fame, which has honoured recipients such as Claudia Karvan, Jack Thompson, Gary Sweet, Roy Billing, Steve Bisley, and Michael Caton.

The last festival was held in March 2012.

== History ==
Established by current festival director Barry Watterson, The Australian Film Festival evolved from the 2009 Australian Film Week, a week-long showcase of classic Australian films held at the Randwick Ritz cinema during Sydney's Coogee Arts Fest. The expansion saw the festival become Australia's most comprehensive presentation of Australian film, with founding director Barry Watterson citing the purpose of the festival being "The long term development of Australian film content in a rapidly changing environment and the building of audiences for Australian film."

=== 2010: 24 February – 7 March ===
The Australian Film Festival premiered on 24 February 2010 at Randwick Ritz cinema. In collaboration with Popcorn Taxi, the festival's opening night reunited the original cast and crew of Mad Max for a screening of the Australian cult film, followed be a Q&A with actors including Steve Bisley and Hugh Keays-Byrne. The festival ran for 11 days, and screened 21 feature films, short films and documentaries, including; Happy Feet, The Dinner Party and Bad Boy Bubby.

The inaugural Australian Film Festival concluded on 7 March with the Australian Short Film Competition, coinciding with The Spot Food and Film Festival at Randwick.

=== 2011: 2–12 March ===
In its second year, the Australian Film Festival opened on 2 March with Australian production The Wedding Party, alongside a showcase of Sydney premieres that included The Reef, Griff the Invisible and A Heartbeat Away. Included in the Australian Film Festival Program was a free session of Finding Nemo, which screened outdoors at Clovelly Beach Cinema By the Sea.

Following on from the retrospective session of Mad Max in 2010, Popcorn Taxi returned again with a screening of The Sum of Us. Lead actor Jack Thompson was in attendance for the film and the Q&A session which followed.

The second AFF closed on 12 March with The Spot Food and Film Festival and the Australian Short Film Competition, which was judged by Australian filmmakers and actors, including David Field.

== Festival Events ==
=== Australian Short Film competition ===
The Australian Short Film Competition is traditionally held on the last day of the AFF, and is one of the Festival's competitive elements. In 2011, notable short films screened during the competition included The Telegram Man and the 2011 Academy Award Winning Best Animated Short, The Lost Thing.

In 2010, My Uncle Bluey won the Australian Short Film Competition. In 2011, the competition was won by Ariel Klieman's film Deeper Than Yesterday.

=== FutureFilm Screenplay competition ===
The Future Film Scriptwriting Competition, in association with Networking Action For Filmmakers And Actors, provides writers with the opportunity to have their short scripts acted on stage through a moved reading. In 2011, judges included Liz Doran and Ross Grayson Bell. The winner of the competition is awarded a $1000 cash prize.

=== Workshops ===
The Australian Film Festival presents multiple workshops, seminars and scriptwriting competitions throughout their season, encouraging the growth and discussion of Australian cinema. Past workshops have included discussions with filmmakers, practical filmmaking courses and scriptwriting tutorials. In 2011, filmmakers such as Louise Alston, Gale Edwards and Andrew Traucki all led one of the AFF's workshops.

=== The Australian Film Walk of Fame ===
The Australian Film Walk of Fame began in 2008 at the Randwick Ritz as an initiative to honor Australian film celebrities. Recipients inducted to the Walk of Frame prior to the inception of the Australian Film Festival have included Michael Caton, Roy Billing and Charles Tingwell.

On 7 March 2010, with the support of Randwick City Council and the Ritz Cinema, the Australian Film Festival inducted Steve Bisley and Claudia Karvan to the Australian Film Walk of Fame.

In 2011, Gary Sweet and Jack Thompson were both initiated to the Australian Film Walk of Fame on 13 March, the closing night of the second Australian Film Festival.

== Festival Directors ==
- Barry Watterson (2010 – Present)
