= Gary Sweet =

Australian actor (born 1957)

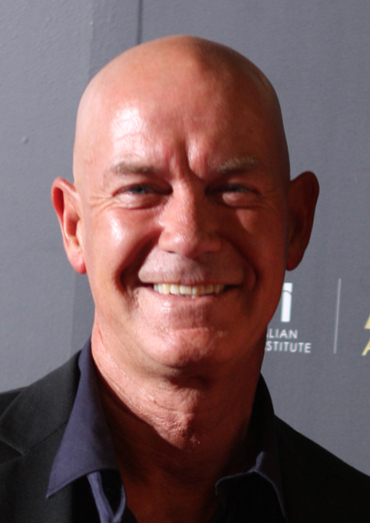
- Sweet in 2012
- Born: 22 May 1957 (age 69); Melbourne, Victoria, Australia
- Education: Sturt Teachers' College
- Occupation: Actor
- Years active: 1980–present
- Spouse(s): Lenore Smith (m. 1981; div. 1983) Jill Miller (m. 1987; div. 1993) Johanna Griggs (m. 1995; div. 1999)
- Partner: Nadia Dyall
- Children: 6, including Frank Sweet
- Awards: Australian Film Institute Award for Best Actor in a Leading Role in a Television Drama: (1991, 1992 – Police Rescue); Logie Award for Most Popular Actor: (1993 – Police Rescue); Logie Award for Most Outstanding Actor in a Series: (1993 – Police Rescue); Inductee into the Australian Film Walk of Fame: (2011)

Gary Sweet (born 22 May 1957) is an Australian film and television actor known for his roles in Alexandra's Project (as Steve), Police Rescue (as Sergeant 'Mickey' McClintock), Cody (as Cody), Big Sky (as Chris Manning), Bodyline (as Donald Bradman), Stingers (as DI Luke Harris) and House Husbands (as Lewis Crabb). He finished in the top 3 of Network 10’s I’m a Celebrity Get Me Out Of Here 2026, losing out to Concetta Caristo.

== Early life ==
Sweet attended Brighton High School in Adelaide. He later obtained a teaching degree and took up drama while at Sturt Teachers' College.

== Career ==
=== Film and television ===
Sweet's first role was in 1980 low-budget horror film Nightmares (also known as Stage Fright). In the early 1980s, he became recognisable through the ongoing role of Leslie 'Magpie' Maddern in the TV series The Sullivans, for which he won a Logie Award.

In 1984, Sweet had his first starring role as Donald Bradman in the miniseries Bodyline, the story of the 1932–33 Test cricket series between England and Australia, alongside Hugo Weaving.

Early films included a lead role in the 1985 film An Indecent Obsession, based on the novel of the same name by Colleen McCullough, as well as a role in 1987 war film The Lighthorsemen. He also starred in award-winning 1987 miniseries The Great Bookie Robbery, playing the role of Chico White.

From 1990 to 1996, Sweet starred in a leading role in the TV drama series Police Rescue as Sgt. Steve 'Mickey' McClintock. This role led him to win several major television awards, including an AFI Award for Best Lead Actor in a TV Drama (in 1991 and 1992), the Variety Club Heart Award for TV Actor of the Year (1993), and a TV Week Silver Logie Award for Most Popular Actor and Most Outstanding Actor (1994). During this period, Sweet also appeared in 1994 miniseries The Battlers, opposite Jaqueline McKenzie.

Sweet starred in Big Sky, and Dog's Head Bay. He took a continuing role in the police drama series Stingers until the show's conclusion in 2004. Other prominent television roles have included The Circuit, Rain Shadow (both 2007) and police drama Cops L.A.C.. In 2008, he narrated the documentary series Sudden Impact.

From 2012 until 2017, Sweet had a leading role in the drama/comedy House Husbands as Lewis Crabb. Nine Network had considered a potential spin-off centred around Sweet's character, but decided not to go ahead with it.

Sweet's notable film roles have included The Tracker (2002), Alexandra's Project (2003) and Gettin' Square (2003. He also appeared in the acclaimed independent drama film 2:37 (2006), with his son, as well as in a modern-day imagining of Macbeth (2006), alongside Sam Worthington.

Internationally, Sweet appeared in 2010 American studio film The Chronicles of Narnia: The Voyage of the Dawn Treader as Lord Drinian. He also featured in 2010 war miniseries The Pacific.

Sweet was a contestant on Season 5 of competition series Dancing with the Stars and made it to the final seven. His partner was dancer Eliza Campagna.

On 29 October 2024, Sweet was named as part of the cast in the feature film Scoby. In June 2025, Sweet wrapped a six-week guest stint in Neighbours, which went to air later in the year, before the serial ended. He branded it "a bucket list moment".

In January 2026, Sweet participated as a contestant on the twelfth season of reality competition series I’m a Celebrity... Get Me Out of Here!, hosted by Robert Irwin and Julia Morris.

=== Theatre ===
Sweet has also appeared in several stage productions, including The Club, and Tony McNamara's play The Recruit. He has appeared in the Frankie Valli-tribute musical Oh, What a Night, and in Trevor Ashley's musical comedy Little Orphan trAshley with Rhonda Burchmore.

=== Music ===
Sweet dabbled in the Australian music scene with limited success in the early 1990s. Sweet released a cover of Billy Thorpe's "Most People I Know (Think That I'm Crazy)" in 1994 through Polygram Records Australia. The single peaked at number 52 on the ARIA Charts, and spent seven weeks in the top 100.

== Personal life ==
Sweet married actress Lenore Smith on 7 November 1981 in his parents' garden in Warradale. The couple had met in a lift at Crawford Productions a little over five months beforehand. They divorced in 1983. From 1987 to 1993, Sweet was married to lawyer Jill Miller. They have two children, including Frank Sweet who became an actor. Sweet married television presenter and former Commonwealth Games swimmer Johanna Griggs in 1995 and they had two children.

In 2013, Sweet was criticised by some women's magazines after he admitted that he was "a five or six out of 10 dad" to his children. Sweet has been in a relationship with former air hostess Nadia Dyall since 2011. They have two children. In March 2018, Sweet became a grandfather.

Gary Sweet is an ambassador and ex player for the Glenelg Tigers, an Australian rules football club who play in the South Australian National Football League. He is also a supporter of the Manly Sea Eagles rugby league club who play in the National Rugby League.

In 2004, Sweet become the public face of "The Performance Pack Initiative", an information campaign for men with impotence problems from Bayer, GlaxoSmithKline and Impotence Australia. Bans against direct advertising prescription medicines meant that Sweet was unable to directly mention the drug, Levitra, but this code was broken when Sweet mentioned Levitra on an Adelaide radio programme. The Australian Broadcasting Corporation's Media Watch reported that Sweet was being investigated by the Therapeutic Goods Administration for possible breach of advertising codes.

On a 1 February 2026 episode of I’m a Celebrity...Get Me Out of Here!, Sweet revealed that from birth, he was raised by his uncle and aunt, saying: "Phil and his wife were unable to have children. So when the baby was born, they (Bill and his wife) gave the baby to his younger brother, Phil. The baby was me… so my biological parents became my uncle and aunty, my sisters became my cousins… I've never, ever, ever told this story."

On 20 August 2026, Sweet was named in the cast of film Before You Leave.

== Filmography ==
=== Film ===
Year	Film	Role	Notes
1980	Nightmares	Terry Besanko	Film
1985	An Indecent Obsession	Michael Wilson	Film
1986	Body Business	Brian Doyle	TV movie
1987	The Lighthorsemen	Frank	Film
1988	The Dreaming	Geoff	Film
1988	Fever	Jeff Maslim	Film
1988	Becca	Matt Bourke	TV movie
1990	What the Moon Saw	Alan Wilson	Film
1990	More Winners: Boy Soldiers	Sergeant	TV movie
1992	Children of the Dragon	Larry	TV series
1993	Crimebroker	Luke Blair	TV movie
1994	Police Rescue: The Movie	Sgt. Steve 'Mickey' McClintock	TV movie
1996	Two Bob Mermaid	White father	Short film
1997	Love in Ambush	Eddie Norton	TV movie
2001	Hard Knox	Monorail Ron	TV movie
2001	The Big House	Jacko	Short film
2001	Bodyjackers	O'Grady	Film
2002	The Tracker	The Fanatic	Film
2002	Tempe Tip	Nico	Film
2003	Alexandra's Project	Steve	Film
2003	Gettin' Square	Chicka Martin	Film
2005	Dust Storm	Tom	Short film
2006	2:37	Mr Darcy	Film
2006	Operating Instructions	Paul	Short film
2006	Macbeth	Duncan	Film
2008	Bitter & Twisted	Greg Praline	Film
2008	The Tumbler	Hurtle Hamilton	Film
2009	Subdivision	Digger Kelly	Film
2010	The Chronicles of Narnia: The Voyage of the Dawn Treader	Lord Drinian	Film
2010	Lucidya	The Game Presenter	Short film
2011	The Telegram Man	John Lewis	Short film
2011	Bush Basher		Short film
2012	Fatal Honeymoon	Detective Gary Campbell	TV movie
2012	Dangerous Remedy	Superintendent John Matthews	TV movie
2013	Adoration	Saul	Film
2013	Nerve	Ben Livingstone	Film
2013	Charlie's Country	Publican	Film
2013	Trouble Down Under	Big Red the Kangaroo (voice)	Animated film
2015	A Month of Sundays (aka A Sunday Too Far)	Self	Film
2015	House of Bulger: The AFL Footy Show		TV movie
2017	Making Muriel	Self	Docufilm
2018	It’s Christmas	Mick Kingston	Short film
2019	Ritual	Ray Devlin	Short film
2019	Two Heads Creek	Hans	Film
2019	Tour De Legacy – The Western Front	Narrator	Docufilm
2020	Ayaan	Sergeant Simmons	Short film
2020	Paper Champions	Terry	Film
2023	A Savage Christmas	Peter Hall	Film
2027	Before You Leave	Dusty	Film
TBA	Scoby	TBA	Film
TBA	Patched	Shark	In post-production

=== Television ===
Year	Film	Role	Notes
1981–1983	The Sullivans	Leslie 'Magpie' Maddern	377 episodes
1983	Starting Out	Rod Turner	
1984	Carson's Law	Paul Tabener	1 episode
1984	Bodyline	Donald Bradman	Miniseries, 7 episodes
1986	Prime Time	Craig Lawrence	
1987	The Great Bookie Robbery	Chico White	Miniseries, 3 episodes
1988	A Country Practice	Bernie Allen	2 episodes
1988–1990	The Flying Doctors	Nick Sanderson / Vince Maguire	3 episodes
1989–1992	Tanamera - Lion of Singapore	Tony	Miniseries, 7 episodes
1990	Come In Spinner	Jack	Miniseries, 4 episodes
1990	Skirts	Tom Waters	4 episodes
1990–1996	Police Rescue	Sergeant Steve 'Mickey' McClintock	62 episodes
1991	All Together Now	Roger Dixon Barrow	1 episode
1992	Children of the Dragon	Larry	Miniseries, 2 episodes
1994	The Battlers	Snow Grimshaw	Miniseries
1994–1995	Cody	Cody	6 TV movies
1997–1999	Big Sky	Chris Manning	53 episodes
1999	Wildside	Cleary	1 episode
1999	Chuck Finn	Captain Candlelight	1 episode
1999	Dog's Head Bay	Alex Santorini	13 episodes
2000	Pizza	Army Commander	1 episode
2000–2004	Stingers	Inspector Luke Harris / Bobby Tait	85 episodes
2001	Cold Feet	Rod Ellison	Season 4, episode 8: "Cold Feet"
2001–2005	Blue Heelers	Danny OKeefe / Sergeant Bob Wilkie	5 episodes
2007	Rain Shadow	Larry Riley	6 episodes
2007–2010	The Circuit	Magistrate Peter Lockhart	Season 2, 12 episodes
2009	Rescue: Special Ops	Shane Gallagher	Season 1, 5 episodes
2010	The Pacific	Gunnery Sgt. Elmo "Gunny" Haney	Miniseries, 3 episodes
2010	Cops L.A.C.	Superintendent Jack Finchin	13 episodes
2011	Small Time Gangster	Barry Donald	8 episodes
2012	Problems	Mr Moth	4 episodes
2015; 2017	The Doctor Blake Mysteries	Norman Baker	Season 3, episode 7: "Room Without a View", Season 5 episode 7: "A Good Drop" & Season 5 episode 8: "Hark the Angels Sing"
2012–2017	House Husbands	Lewis Crabbe	58 episodes
2016	Wolf Creek	Jason	1 episode
2016	Janet King	Roger Embry	3 episodes
2017	Wake in Fright	Tim Hynes	Miniseries, 2 episodes
2018	Harrow	Bruce Reimers	1 episode
2018	Orange Is the New Brown	Art Gallery Owner / Spoiler Cop	3 episodes
2020	Hungry Ghosts	Hugh	Miniseries, 1 episode
2020	Bloom	Old Donnie	4 episodes
2020	Mint Condition	Conway	Web miniseries
2020	Mystery Road: Origins	Alkemi	6 episodes
2020	2121	Geoff Maxwell	Web miniseries, 1 episode
2021	Jack Irish	Det Phil Maitland	4 episodes
2021	Wentworth	Dale Langdon	3 episodes
2023	No Escape	Peter Winbourne	4 episodes
2023	The Clearing	Wilkes	Miniseries, 4 episodes
2024	Darby and Joan	Ellory Malcolm	Episode 1
2025	Neighbours	Greg Murphy	Recurring role
2026	NCIS: Sydney	Aussie Bob Prince	1 episode

=== Podcast ===
Year	Film	Role	Notes
2021	The Orchard	DJ Simes	Miniseries (Audible)

=== Other appearances ===
Year	Title	Role	Notes
2006	Dancing with the Stars	Contestant	Season 5, 6 episodes. Placed 7th
2007	Things To Try Before You Die	Co-host	1 episode
2008	Sudden Impact	Narrator	Documentary series
2010	Australian Druglords	Presenter	10 episodes
2013	Commando	Voice	Documentary miniseries, 4 episodes
2022	Access All Areas: Erebus Motorsport	Narrator	Documentary miniseries, 8 episodes
2026	I’m a Celebrity... Get Me Out of Here!	Contestant	Season 12

== Theatre ==
Year	Production	Role	Notes
	What the Butler Saw		Sturt College of Advanced Education
	The Wild Duck		Sturt College of Advanced Education
1991	The Removalists	Kenny Carter	STCSA
1998	The Club	Laurie	MTC
2001	Tony McNamara's The Recruit	Josh	MTC
2002	Frankie Valli’s Oh, What a Night	Paul Burns	Majestic Theatre Company
2013	Trevor Ashley's Little Orphan trAshley	Daddy Warlow	Showqueen Productions
2014	Our Don	Narrator	Adelaide Symphony Orchestra
2014	La Cage aux Folles	Edouard Dindon	The Production Company
2017	Muriel's Wedding	Bill Heslop	STC

== Music ==
=== Singles ===
List of singles, with selected chart positions
Title	Year	Chart positions
Title	Year	AUS
"Most People I Know (Think That I'm Crazy)"	1994	52

== Awards ==
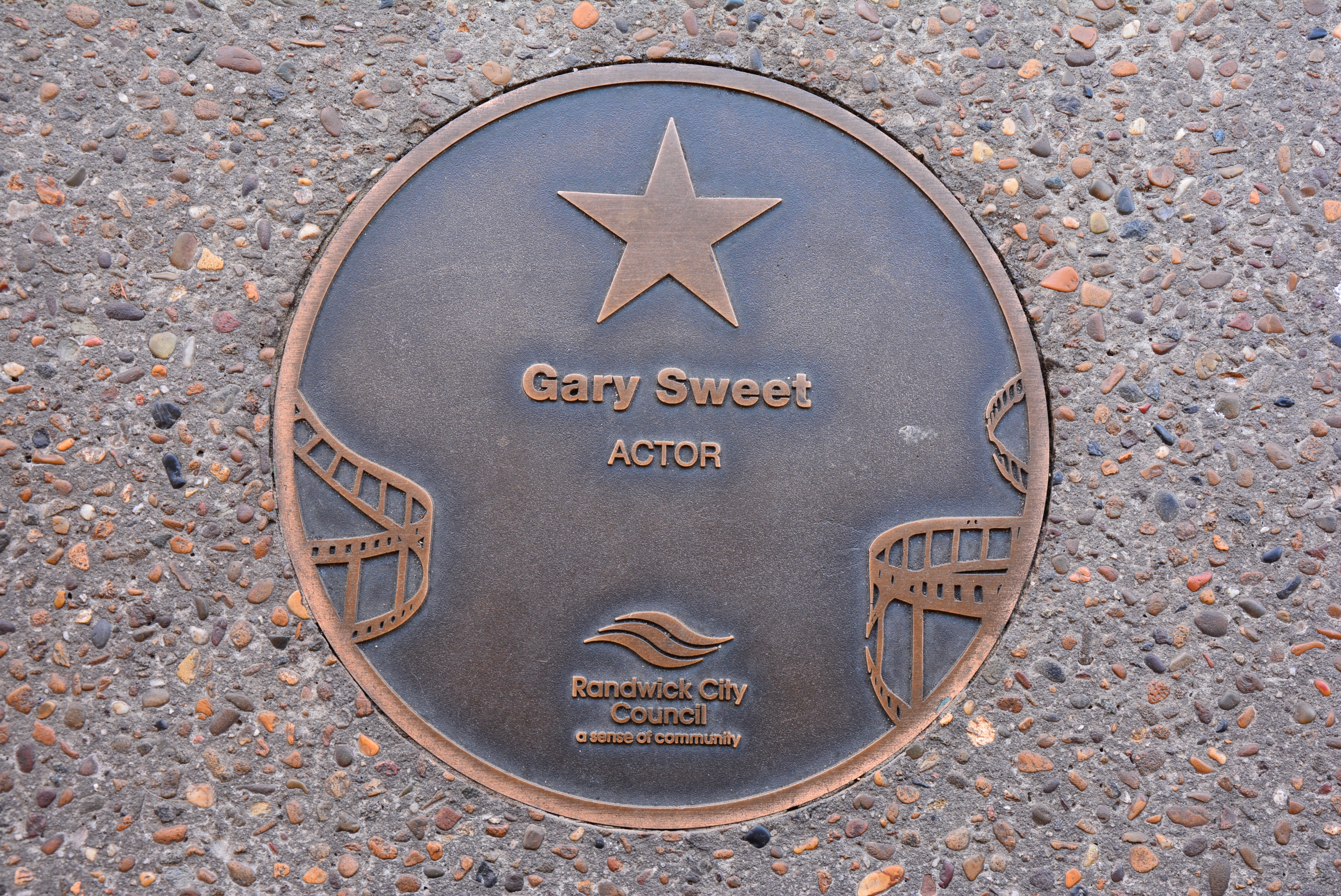
Sweet's plaque at the Australian Film Walk of Fame, the Ritz Cinema, Randwick, Sydney

Sweet has won several awards in his acting career, including two Logie Awards – one in 1982 for The Sullivans (Most Popular New Talent) and one in 1994 for Police Rescue (Most Popular Actor).

In 2011, Sweet was initiated into the Australian Film Walk of Fame on 13 March, as part of the closing night celebrations of the Australian Film Festival.

=== Awards ===
Year	Award	Title	Status
1982	TV Week Logie Award	Most Popular New Talent (The Sullivans)	Won
1991	AFI Award	Best Actor in a Lead Role in a TV Drama (Police Rescue)	Won
1992	AFI Award	Best Actor in a Lead Role in a TV Drama (Police Rescue)	Won
1992	TV Week Logie Award	Most Popular Actor (Police Rescue)	Nominated
1993	Variety Club Heart Award	TV Actor of the Year	Won
1994	TV Week Logie Award	Most Outstanding Actor (Police Rescue)	Won
1996	TV Week Logie Award	Most Outstanding Actor (Police Rescue)	Nominated
2003	TV Week Logie Award	Most Outstanding Actor (Stingers)	Nominated
2004	TV Week Logie Award	Most Outstanding Actor (Stingers)	Nominated
2011	Australian Film Festival	Australian Film Walk of Fame Inductee	Inducted
2021	MEAA Ensemble Awards	Outstanding Performance by an Ensemble in a Miniseries / TV movie (Hungry Ghosts)	Won
2021	MEAA Ensemble Awards	Outstanding Performance by an Ensemble in a Drama Series (Mystery Road: Origins)	Won
