= Jack Thompson (actor) =

Australian actor (born 1940)

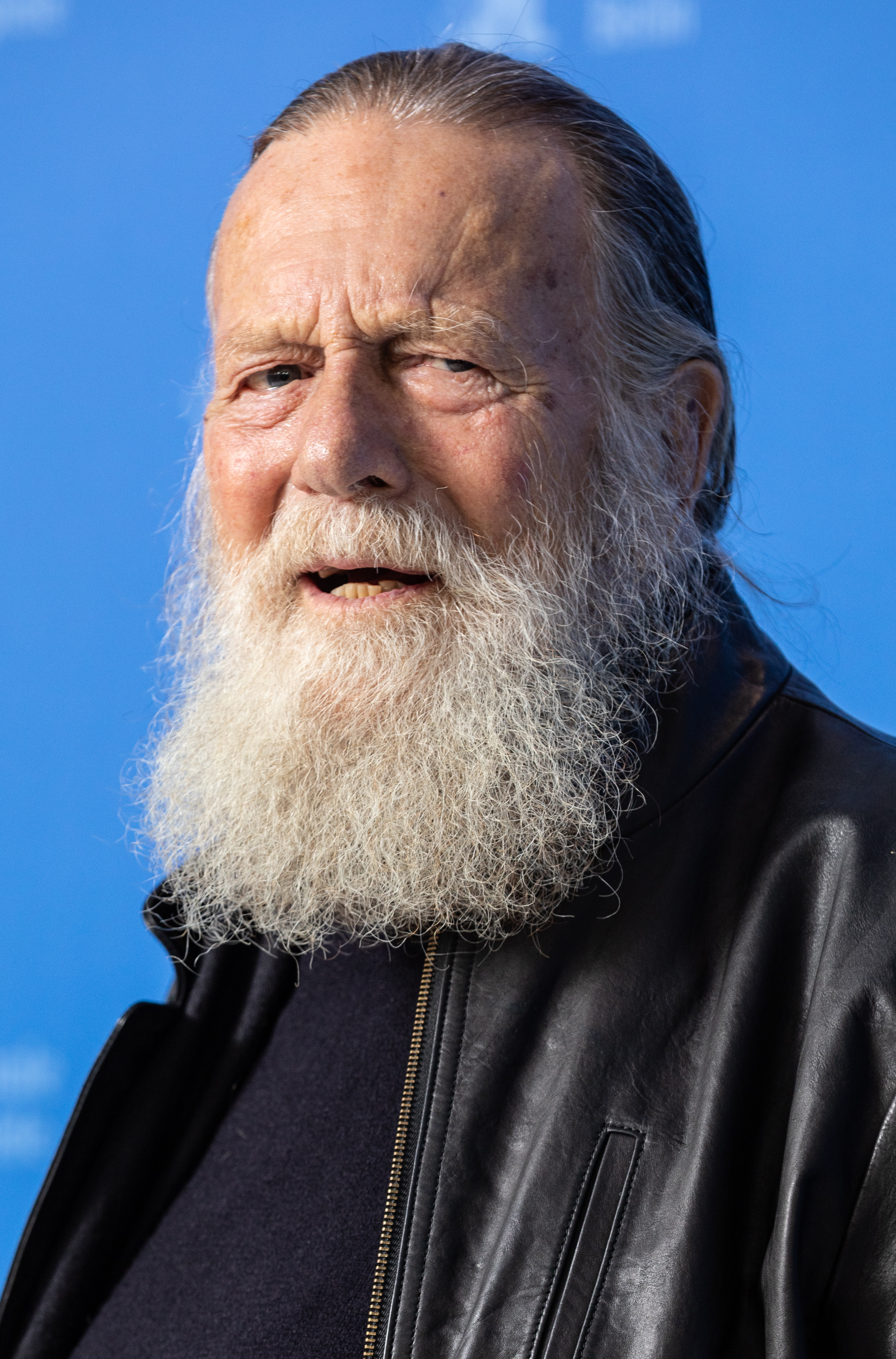
- Thompson in 2020
- Born: John Hadley Pain; 31 August 1940 (age 86); Manly, New South Wales, Australia
- Occupation: Actor
- Years active: 1960–present
- Agent: DPN
- Spouse: Leona King
- Children: 2
- Awards: Inductee into the Australian Film Walk of Fame (2011); Chauvel Award (2006); Film Living Legend Award (2005); Critics Circle of Australia Award For Contribution to Australian Cinema (1998); Logie Hall of Fame (1995); Raymond Longford Award (1994); Australian Film Institute Award Best Actor - Breaker Morant (1980); Cannes Award Best Supporting Actor - Breaker Morant (1980); Hoyts Prize for Best Performance - Sunday Too Far Away (1975)

John Hadley Thompson, AM (né Pain; born 31 August 1940) is an Australian actor and a major figure of Australian cinema, particularly Australian New Wave. He is best known for his role as a lead actor in several acclaimed Australian films, including such classics as The Club (1980), Sunday Too Far Away (1975), The Man from Snowy River (1982), Petersen (1974), and Breaker Morant (1980); he won Cannes and AFI acting awards for the latter film.

In 2002, he was made an honorary member of the Australian Cinematographers Society, and was the recipient of a Living Legend Award at the 2005 Inside Film Awards.

== Early life ==
Born John Hadley Pain in Manly, a suburb of Sydney, Thompson was three years old when his mother Marjorie died, leaving his father Harold (a purser for Qantas, seconded to the RAAF during the war) unable to care for him and his brother, David.He was sent to Lake House orphanage in Narrabeen by his aunt and was subsequently adopted by the poet and ABC broadcaster John Thompson and his wife Pat, after which he changed his surname. Jack is film reviewer Peter Thompson's adopted brother.

Thompson was educated at Sydney Boys High School. He left school at 14, became a jackaroo in the Northern Territory, and took labouring jobs in New South Wales.

After working in an agricultural lab, Thompson at the age of 20, joined the army in 1960 so that he could earn a science degree.

== Career ==
=== Theatre ===
He enrolled at the University of Queensland in 1963 and transferred to an arts degree, performing in theatre at night, including the Twelfth Night Theatre and UQ Dramatic Society in Brisbane.

His talent was nurtured and developed at the Producers Authors Composers and Talent (PACT) Centre.

He appeared on stage in The Devils in 1968.

=== Television roles ===
Thompson decided to take acting seriously, giving himself a year to make it.

His TV career began with the soap opera Motel (1968), and he had guest appearances on numerous serials, including Riptide, Woobinda, Animal Doctor, Skippy, The Rovers, Division 4, Homicide and Matlock Police. He also appeared in the documentary short Personnel, or People? (1969), directed by Donald Crombie.

Thompson had a leading role in spy drama series Spyforce (1971–1973), playing the role of Erskine who did missions in World War II.

He continued to guest-star on shows such as Over There, Matlock Police (again), Ryan, Boney and Elephant Boy.

He guest-starred on The Evil Touch and Homicide again; he also appeared in Marijuana: Possession and the Law (1974).

=== Films and stardom ===
Thompson made his film debut in That Lady from Peking in 1968, and his first lead role was in TV movie Silo 15 (filmed in 1969 and released in 1971).

He had a supporting role in Wake in Fright in 1971, and he received excellent reviews for his performance in one of the stories in Libido in 1973, with his segment written by David Williamson. He also starred in TV movie Linehaul in 1973.

Thompson became an Australian film star playing the title role in Petersen (1974), written by Williamson and directed by Tim Burstall. The film was a success at the box office. He did the TV movie Human Target (1974), then starred in the highly acclaimed Sunday Too Far Away (1975), playing a shearer.

Thompson played the title role in Scobie Malone (1975), based on the Jon Cleary novel Helga's Web. It was produced by American Casey Robinson, who said "Jack Thompson is a great part of my reason to become involved in this venture. I have no doubt whatsoever that when this film is seen overseas he'll be turned instantly into an international star. There aren't many male actors like him around any more. There's something there that reminds me very much of Bogart." The film was a failure at the box office.

He did an episode of Armchair Theatre, titled "Tully".

Thompson had a supporting role in Caddie (1976), directed by Crombie, which was a big success.

Thompson had become nationally famous playing "macho" type roles. "I think it reflects its time so accurately," he said later. "There was a preoccupation with the macho Australian male; it's a thing that had to be examined or purged in film."

=== Character actor ===
Thompson then deliberately decided to take character parts, out of a fear of typecasting and "also an understanding that unless I could get out of that target area, then I wouldn't be allowed to be seen as an actor."

He guest starred in an episode of Luke's Kingdom and played the second lead in Mad Dog Morgan (1976) with Dennis Hopper. He took some time off to work on a script with his brother then had a key support role in The Chant of Jimmie Blacksmith (1978). He supported imported stars Karen Black and Keir Dullea in a TV movie shot in Australia, Because He's My Friend (1978).

Thompson returned to acting after another break to play the lead role in a sex comedy, The Journalist (1979). "I haven't made any films since then because I haven't liked the parts I've been offered, and also I've been too busy promoting the Australian film industry overseas", said Thompson at the time. The film became a notorious flop. He worked on a script with his brother called Welcome Stranger.

He was offered a role in Breaker Morant (1980), directed by Bruce Beresford—the part of Private Hancock. Thompson turned it down, Beresford rewrote the script and offered him the part again, and Thompson accepted. Then filming was delayed. John Hargreaves who was to play the lawyer became unavailable; Thompson took that part and Bryan Brown played Hancock. The film was a considerable success. Thompson won the Cannes Film Festival Award for Best Actor.

Thompson supported US stars William Holden and Rick Schroeder in The Earthling (1980) then was top billed in The Club (1980), directed by Beresford from a play by Williamson.

"You get awfully fed up with the public image that you must live up to", he said in an interview around this time. "I just want to continue becoming a part of the Australian film industry, not for materialistic reasons but because I enjoy it. I not only want to act, but produce and possibly direct".

Thompson went to New Zealand to make Bad Blood (1982) playing killer Stanley Graham, then had a support role in The Man from Snowy River (1982), playing Clancy of the Overflow. Among the roles he auditioned for around this time were the leads in Flash Gordon and The Thing.

=== International career ===
Thompson went overseas to support Ingrid Bergman in A Woman Called Golda (1982). He was Lee Remick's husband in a remake of The Letter (1982), and played a British POW in Merry Christmas Mr. Lawrence (1983) with David Bowie and Tom Conti.

Back in Australia Thompson starred in a mini series about wharfies in the Depression, Waterfront (1983). He went to Europe to star in a swashbuckler for Paul Verhoeven, Flesh + Blood (1985), then returned to Australia to star in Burke and Wills (1985). This film was a box office disappointment.

Thompson supported Linda Evans and Jason Robards in a TV mini series, The Last Frontier (1986), which was a huge ratings success. In the US he had a role in Kojak: The Price of Justice (1987) then returned home to play an ASIO officer in Ground Zero (1987).

Thompson was a love interest for Stefanie Powers in Beryl Markham: A Shadow on the Sun (1988) on US TV, and had the lead in an Australian TV movie, The Riddle of the Stinson (1989), playing Bernard O'Reilly.

He co-starred with Raquel Welch in Trouble in Paradise (1989) for US TV, then did a mini series in New Zealand, The Rainbow Warrior Conspiracy (1989).

He did a US TV movie After the Shock (1990) and had a support part in Turtle Beach (1992) and Wind (1992).

He had a supporting part as Cliegg Lars in George Lucas's Star Wars: Episode II – Attack of the Clones (2002).

=== Character actor ===
Thompson began to increasingly work as a character actor in the US with roles in Ruby Cairo (1993), directed by Graeme Clifford, and A Far Off Place (1994). He narrowly missed being cast in the lead part in Schindler's List.

He returned to Australia to play Russell Crowe's father in The Sum of Us (1994), then did A Woman of Independent Means (1995) in the US and Flight of the Albatross (1995) in New Zealand.

He had a support role in Broken Arrow (1996), did The Thorn Birds: The Missing Years (1996) back home and Last Dance (1996) for Beresford in the US.

Thompson starred in the Australian TV movie McLeod's Daughters (1996). He was Alicia Silverstone's father in Excess Baggage (1997), then did Under the Lighthouse Dancing (1997) in Australia. He appeared in the Clint Eastwood-directed Midnight in the Garden of Good and Evil (1997) as Sonny Seiler, the attorney of Kevin Spacey's character, Jim Williams. (Seiler himself appeared in the movie as the judge in Williams' trial.) "I was amazed at how he adapted to Geechee to fit the role of playing me," Seiler said. "It was a pleasure working with him."

Back in Australia Thompson provided a voice for The Magic Pudding (2000) and appeared in Yolngu Boy (2001). He had a support part in the new version of South Pacific (2001), the mini series based on My Brother Jack (2001), Original Sin (2001), Star Wars: Episode II - Attack of the Clones (2002), The Assassination of Richard Nixon (2004), and Oyster Farmer (2005).

Thompson had a key role in two films directed by Brett Leonard: the Marvel Comics based Man-Thing (2005) and Feed (2006), the latter written by and starring his son.

Thompson had support roles in The Good German (2006), Bastard Boys (2007), December Boys (2007), Leatherheads (2008), Ten Empty (2008), Australia (2008), Mao's Last Dancer (2009) for Beresford, The Karenskys (2009), Don't Be Afraid of the Dark (2010), Rake (2010), Blinder (2013), The Great Gatsby (2013), Mystery Road (2013), Around the Block (2013), Bonnie & Clyde (2013) for Beresford, Devil's Playground (2014), Ruben Guthrie (2015), The Light Between Oceans (2016), Don't Tell (2017), Blue World Order (2017) and Swinging Safari (2018).

He has also acted in television miniseries and appeared as the host of the Channel 7 factual series Find My Family.

=== Other appearances ===
Thompson was the first nude male centrefold in Cleo in 1972. He has also appeared in television commercials, including as the face of the Bank of Melbourne for a decade, and for Claytons. Thompson is featured in a series of recordings of Australian poetry, reciting poems by Henry Lawson, Banjo Paterson, C. J. Dennis, Patrick Joseph Hartigan (aka John O'Brien) and John O'Grady (see Discography below). Interviewed in the Sydney Morning Herald he explains his love of poetry, noting that 'Poetry is sometimes seen as too arty and perhaps not a suitable interest for blokes.'

== Personal life ==
Thompson married Beverley Hackett in 1963, and the five-year marriage produced a son. He met Leona King and her sister Bunkie in 1969, and they entered into a 15-year polyamorous relationship. Leona was 20 and Bunkie was 15 when the relationship began. Bunkie left the relationship in 1985, and is estranged from her sister. Leona remained with Thompson, and gave birth to his second son.

Thompson featured in the first episode of the Australian version of Who Do You Think You Are?, which was televised on 13 January 2008 on SBS, with Thompson discovering that his great-grandfather was Captain Thomas Pain, and his great-great uncle was Alfred Lee, a prominent figure in Sydney society, who donated the journal of Joseph Banks, from Captain Cook's navigation to Australia in the 1770s, to the Mitchell Library in Sydney.

Thompson used to own Hotel Gearin in Katoomba, Blue Mountains. He sold the hotel in June 2011.

== Filmography ==
=== Film ===
Year	Title	Role	Notes
1969	Personnel, or People?		
1971	Wake in Fright	Dick	
1973	Libido	Ken	Segment: "The Family Man"
1974	Marijuana: Possession and the Law		
1974	Petersen	Tony Petersen	
1975	Sunday Too Far Away	Foley	
1975	Scobie Malone	Scobie Malone	
1975	That Lady from Peking	Flunky	
1976	Caddie	Ted	
1976	Mad Dog Morgan	Detective Manwaring	
1976	Jeremy and Teapot	Narrator	Short film
1978	The Chant of Jimmie Blacksmith	Reverend Neville	
1979	The Journalist	Simon Morris	
1980	Breaker Morant	Major J.F. Thomas	
1980	The Earthling	Ross Daley	
1980	The Club	Laurie Holden	
1982	The Man from Snowy River	Clancy	
1982	Bad Blood	Stan Graham	
1983	It's a Living	Passenger	
1983	Merry Christmas, Mr. Lawrence	Group Capt. Hicksley	
1985	Flesh and Blood	Hawkwood	
1985	Burke & Wills	Robert O'Hara Burke	
1986	Short Circuit	Party Guest	
1987	Ground Zero	Trebilcock	
1992	Turtle Beach	Ralph	
1992	Wind	Jack Neville	
1993	A Far Off Place	John Ricketts	
1993	Ruby Cairo	Ed	
1994	The Sum of Us	Harry Mitchell	
1994	Resistance	Mr. Wilson	
1995	Der Flug des Albatros	Mike	
1996	Broken Arrow	Chairman, Joint Chief of Staff	
1996	Last Dance	The Governor	
1997	Excess Baggage	Alexander	
1997	Under the Lighthouse Dancing	Harry	
1997	Midnight in the Garden of Good and Evil	Sonny Seiler	
1999	Feeling Sexy	Magazine Vendor (uncredited)	
2000	The Magic Pudding	Buncle (voice)	
2001	Yolngu Boy	Policeman	
2001	Original Sin	Alan Jordan	
2002	Star Wars: Episode II – Attack of the Clones	Cliegg Lars	
2004	The Assassination of Richard Nixon	Jack Jones	
2004	Oyster Farmer	Skippy	
2005	Man-Thing	Frederic Schist	
2005	Feed	Richard	
2006	Tryst Cosmos	Storyteller	Short film
2006	The Good German	Congressman Breimer	
2007	The Manual	Professor Grey	Short film
2007	December Boys	Bandy	
2008	Ten Empty	Bobby Thompson	
2008	Leatherheads	Harvey	
2008	Australia	Kipling Flynn	
2009	Mao's Last Dancer	Judge Woodrow Seals	
2010	Don't Be Afraid of the Dark	Harris	
2011	Oakie's Outback Adventures	Orpheus	
2011	The Telegram Man	Bill Williams	Short film
2011	The Forgotten Men	Publican	Short film
2013	Around the Block	Mr. O'Donnell	
2013	Mystery Road	Charley Murray	
2013	Blinder	Coach Chang	
2013	The Great Gatsby	Nick Carraway's Doctor, Walter Perkins	
2016	Blue World Order	Harris	
2016	The Light Between Oceans	Ralph Addicott	
2017	Don't Tell	Bob Myers	
2018	Swinging Safari	Mayor	
2020	High Ground	Moran	
2020	Never Too Late	Angus Wilson	

=== Television ===
Year	Title	Role	Notes
1968	Motel	Bill Burke	Episode: "1.132"; Episode: "1.134"
1969	Riptide	Wally / Ted	Episode: "Hagan's Kingdom"; Episode: "Flight of the Curlew"
1970	Woobinda, Animal Doctor	Lenny	Episode: "Lenny"
1970	Skippy	Stefan Imard	Episode: "High Fashion"
1970	The Rovers	Kenneth Baker/ Bill	Episode: "Wright's Peak"; Episode: "A Place of My Own"
1970	Homicide	Jack Skinner / Kevin Ford	Episode: "The Doll"; Episode: "All Correct"
1970	Division 4	Charlie Penn	Episode: "A Trip to the City"
1971-1973	Spyforce	Erskine	42 episodes
1972	Over There	Corporal Harry Logan	Episode: "The Lord Sends the Food and the Devil Sends the Cook"
1972	Behind the Legend	Charles Kingsford-Smith	TV series
1972	Matlock Police	Ron Cook	Episode: "Cook's Endeavor"
1973	Matlock Police	Robbo	Episode: "Squaring Off"
1973	Linehaul	Dave Morgan	TV movie
1973	Boney	Jack / Red Kelly	Episode: "Boney and the Strangler"; Episode: "Boney and the Kelly Gang"
1973	Ryan	John Mitchell / Brian Duncan	Episode: "But When She Was Bad"; Episode: "Where Thunder Sleeps"
1973	Elephant Boy	Chuck Ryder	Episode: "Conservation Man"
1973	Homicide	Ray Enright	Episode: "Mother Superior"
1973	The Evil Touch	Hammer / Evan	Episode "George"; Episode: "Scared to Death"
1974	The Evil Touch	Stockman	Episode: "Kadaitcha Country"
1974	Human Target	Anderson	TV movie
1974	Homicide	Det. Sgt Jack Beck	Episode: "Time and Tide"
1975	Armchair Cinema	Vic Parkes	Episode: "Tully"
1976	Luke's Kingdom		1 episode
1978	Because He's My Friend	Geoff	TV movie
1982	A Shifting Dreaming		TV movie
1982	A Woman Called Golda	Ariel	TV movie
1982	The Letter	Robert Crosbie	TV movie
1984	Waterfront	Maxey Woodbury	TV miniseries
1986	The Last Frontier	Nick Stenning	TV movie
1987	The Riddle of the Stinson	Bernard O'Reilly	TV movie
1987	Kojak: The Price of Justice	Aubrey Dubose	TV movie
1988	Beryl Markham: A Shadow on the Sun	Tom Campbell Black	TV movie
1989	The Rainbow Warrior Conspiracy	Irvine	TV movie
1989	Trouble in Paradise	Jake	TV movie
1990	After the Shock	Fireman	TV movie
1994	The Dwelling Place	Richard	TV miniseries
1994	Girl	Victor Martin	TV movie
1995	A Woman of Independent Means	Sam Garner	TV miniseries
1996	The Thorn Birds: The Missing Years	The Judge	TV movie
1996	McLeod's Daughters	Jack McLeod	TV movie
2001	My Brother Jack	Bernard Brewster	TV movie
2001	South Pacific	Capt. George Brackett	TV movie
2007	Bastard Boys	Tony Tully	TV movie
2007	South Side Story	Himself	Narrator
2009	The Karenskys	Max Karensky	TV movie
2012	Rake	Mr Justice Beesdon	Episode: "R vs. Fenton"
2013	Camp	Jack Jessup	Episode: "Harvest Moon"
2014	Devil's Playground	Cardinal Constantine Neville	TV miniseries
2025	Sam Pang Tonight	Himself	Talkshow

== Awards ==
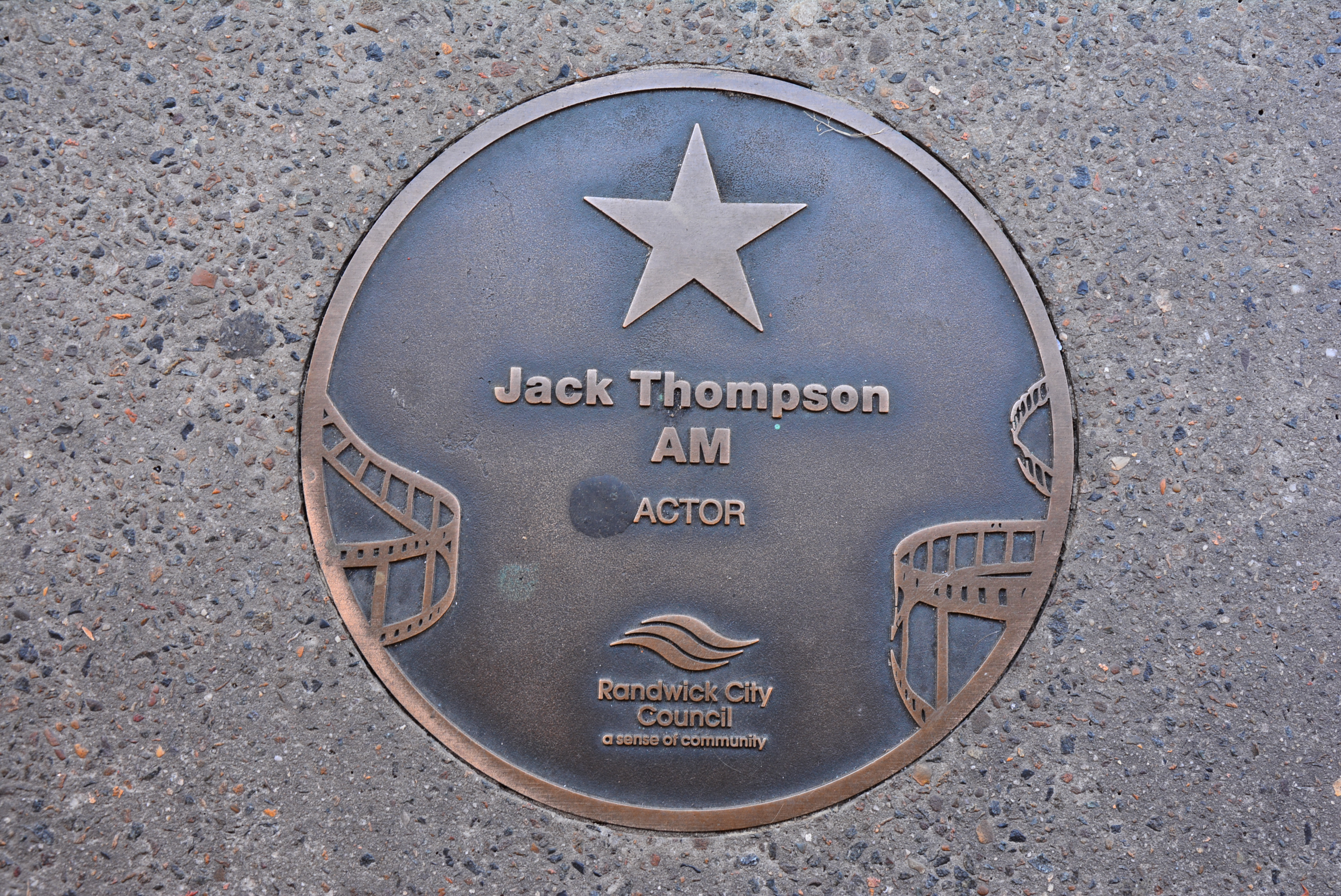
Thompson's plaque at the Australian Film Walk of Fame, the Ritz Cinema, Randwick, Sydney

- 1975 AFI Award: Best Actor, for Sunday Too Far Away and Petersen
- 1980 AFI Award: Best Actor in a Lead Role, for Breaker Morant
- 1980 Cannes Film Festival: Best Supporting Actor, for Breaker Morant
- 1986 Appointed a Member of the Order of Australia for services to the Australian film industry
- 1994 AFI Award: Raymond Longford Award
- 1998 Film Critics Circle of Australia Awards: Special Achievement Award
- 2005 Inside Film Awards: Living Legend IF Award
- 2011 Australian Film Festival: Inductee into the Australian Film Walk of Fame

Thompson also served as an UNHCR Goodwill Ambassador.

== Discography ==
- Jack Thompson: The Bush Poems of A.B. (Banjo) Paterson (Audio recording)|The Bush Poems of A.B. (Banjo) Paterson (2008)
- Jack Thompson: The Campfire Yarns of Henry Lawson (2009)
- Jack Thompson: The Sentimental Bloke, The Poems of C.J. Dennis (2009)
- Jack Thompson: The Battlefield Poems of A.B (Banjo) Paterson (2010)
- Jack Thompson: Favourite Australian Poems (2010)
- Jack Thompson: The Poems of Henry Lawson (2011)
- Jack Thompson: Live at the Gearin Hotel (DVD & CD) (2011)
- Jack Thompson: The Poems of Lewis Carroll (2011)
- Jack Thompson: Live at the Lighthouse CD (2011)

== See also ==
- List of Australian film actors
