= Sudden Impact (disambiguation) =

Sudden Impact is a 1983 Dirty Harry film starring Clint Eastwood.

Sudden Impact may also refer to:

- Sudden Impact (truck), a monster truck
- Sudden Impact (TV series), a 2008 Australian documentary series
- Sudden Impact! Entertainment Company, an American theatrical attractions company
- UFC: Sudden Impact, a 2004 mixed martial arts video game
