= The Spot, New South Wales =

Locality in Sydney, New South Wales, Australia

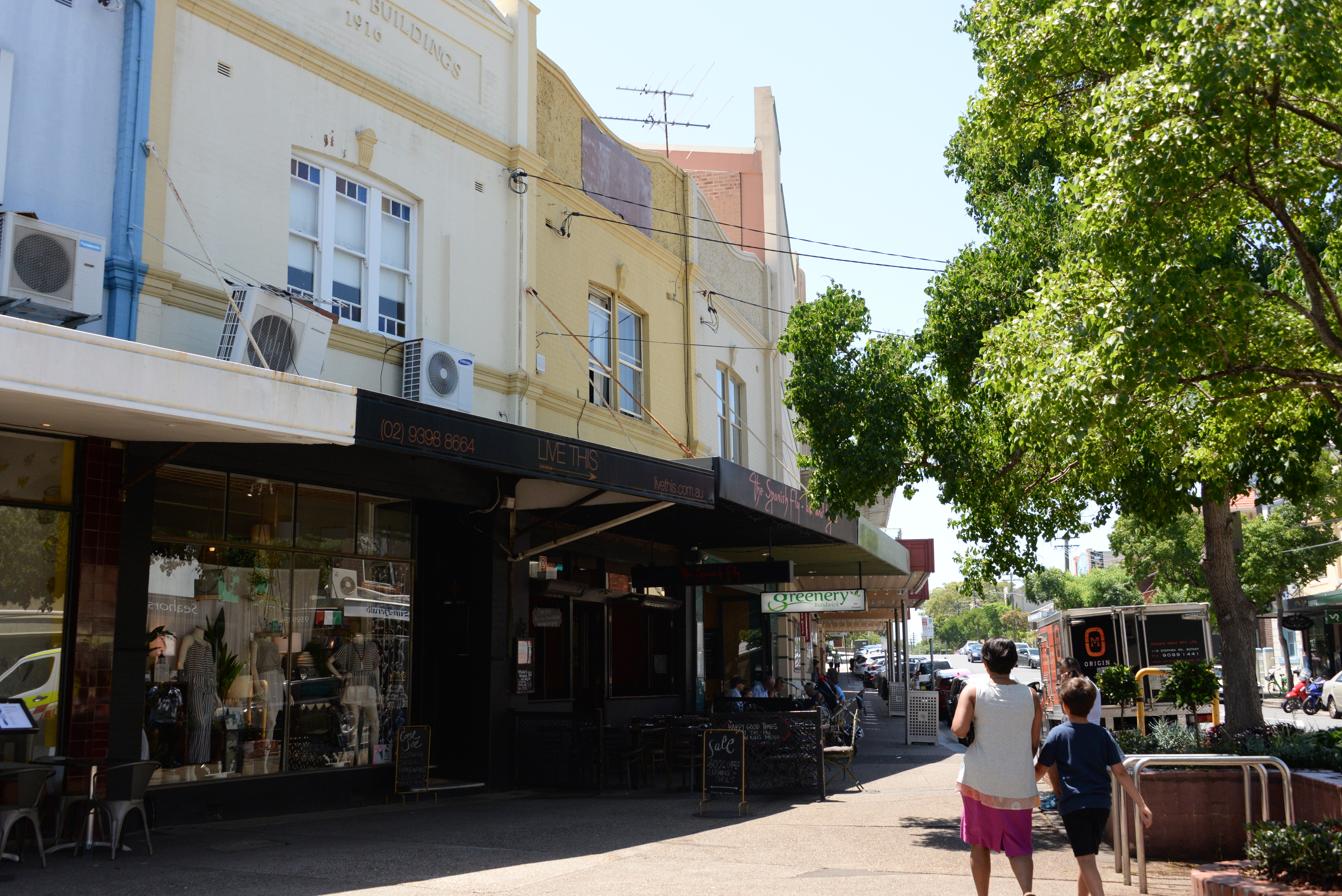
The Spot in Randwick, New South Wales

The Spot is a locality in the Eastern Suburbs of Sydney, New South Wales, Australia, south-east of the CBD. The Spot is located in the south-eastern part of the suburb of Randwick, around the intersection of Perouse Road and St Pauls Street. It is a vibrant part of Randwick and consists of a collection of shops, restaurants, cafes and a cinema.

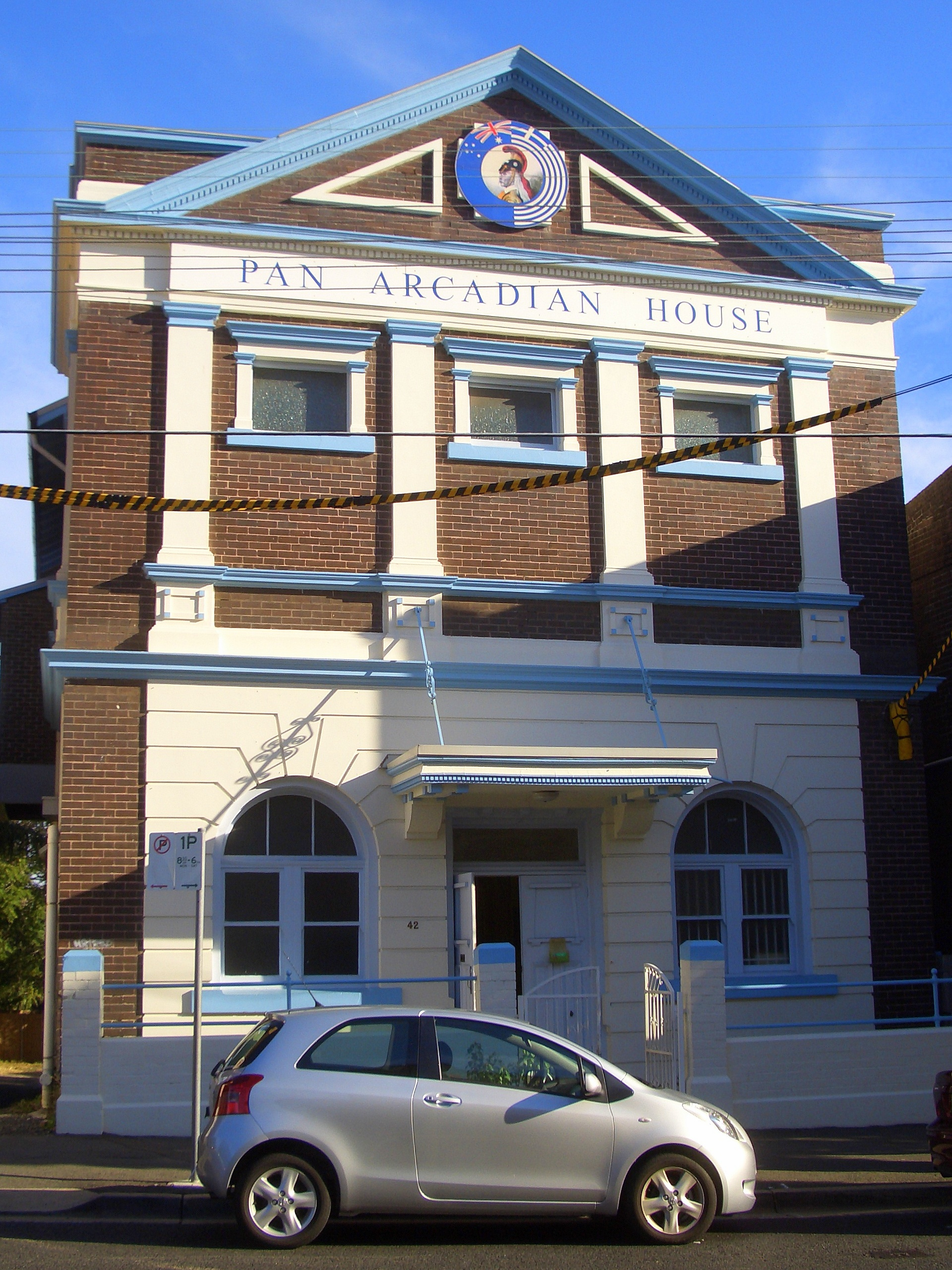
Pan Arcadian House, St Pauls Street

The Spot is a heritage conservation area and has many heritage listed buildings, such as the Ritz Cinema and Pan Arcadian House, a 1930s Masonic Temple and most notably the facade of shops on the corner of Perouse Road and St Pauls Street which follows a curved pattern, necessary for the tram route which used to extend to Coogee Beach.

The Royal Hotel and Randwick shopping centre are a short distance away. The area is well served by public transport with regular Transdev John Holland buses from the central business district and Bondi Junction.

== Name ==
The Spot lies at the geographic centre of a residential suburb that some maps identify as “St Pauls”. The post office located at The Spot is also officially "St Pauls 2031." However, the Geographical Names Board of New South Wales does not list “St Pauls” as an officially registered place name within the Randwick Local Government Area.

The locality name of "The Spot", too, is not officially registered with the Geographical Names Board of New South Wales and, despite wide use, would appear to remain unofficial.

== History ==
=== Early days of the colony ===
Research by a local historical society has revealed that The Spot probably lies on trails that were made through the bushland by members of earliest European settlements in Sydney Cove. Centrally placed at The Spot is a plinth on which is mounted a plaque that notes:

Between January and March, 1788, members of the Lapérouse expedition at Botany Bay and the First Fleet at Sydney Cove passed this place on goodwill visits. Their route is followed closely by parts of Avoca Street, Frenchmans Road and Perouse Road.

=== 'Struggletown' ===
During the early years of the Randwick municipality, the area to the west of The Spot (Barker and Botany Streets) was home to labourers and workmen who built some of the finer homes in the Randwick area. The area was often referred to as 'Struggletown' or, less commonly, 'Irish Town'. The Struggletown name lives on near The Spot, in the form of the business name of the local veterinary clinic in Barker Street.

== Cultural activities ==
=== The Ritz Cinema ===
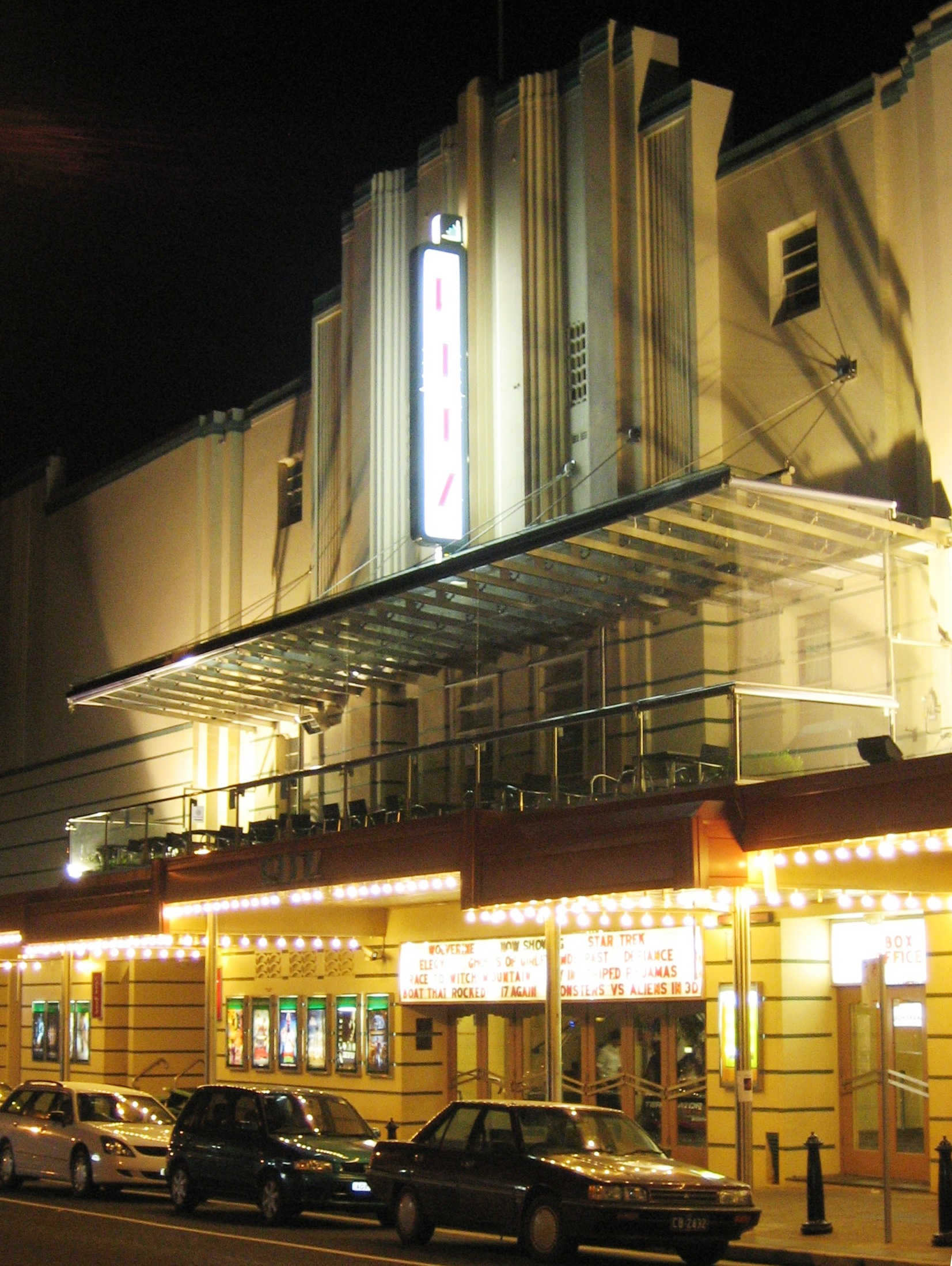
The Ritz in 2009

The Ritz Cinema, built in 1937, is an example of the art deco cinema architecture that found a home in Australia during the 1920s and 1930s. The architect, Aaron Bolt, is known for his classic art deco buildings throughout Sydney, such as his commissions for grand apartment buildings in Potts Point.

Since its construction, the cinema has been owned by, among others, the Hoyts cinema group and the Brigidine Sisters (an order of nuns running the adjacent Brigidine College). In the late 1980s, the current owners planned to demolish the existing cinema and to redevelop the site. However, Randwick City Council and the Minister for Planning intervened and a Permanent Conservation Order was imposed on The Ritz building in March, 1993. The current owners refurbished the building in the late 1990s, adding additional cinemas to the original single principal cinema theatre in order to allow The Ritz to survive in the era of competition with larger multiplex cinema chains. In 1997, The Ritz Cinema was placed on the Register of the National Estate by the Australian Heritage Council. This record notes that:

The Ritz Cinema is the only one of three remaining theatres of this style in an unaltered state still used as a cinema in New South Wales and is one of the few surviving examples of the hundreds of cinemas which were built during the 1930s, one of the most creative periods of cinematic design in Australia... The Ritz, which has operated almost continuously as a movie theatre since 1937, has social values as a community cultural entertainment centre in the Randwick area. The place is also highly valued by the Art Deco Society... The Ritz is significant for its intact and well detailed Art Deco design and is a prominent element in the St Paul's Road urban precinct ...

=== The Spot Food and Film Festival ===
Since 2008 Randwick City Council has held an annual food and film festival at The Spot featuring special screenings of films at The Ritz, live performances and food stalls. The Spot Food and Film Festival is run as a part of the Coogee Arts Festival.

=== Australian Film Walk of Fame ===
In 2008, The Australian Film Festival, The Spot Chamber of Commerce and Randwick City Council established the Australian Film Walk of Fame, which is a "recognition of successful Australian artists in the film industry" and consists of a series of brass plaques set in the pavement on the northern side of St Pauls Street outside the Ritz Cinema. The Council has noted that The Spot Food and Film Festival will provide an ongoing opportunity for additional notable persons to be inducted into the Walk of Fame in the future. The first person recognised in the Walk of Fame was Australian actor Bud Tingwell, whose plaque stands outside the Ritz Cinema. Other Australian cinema identities commemorated in the Walk of Fame include: Michael Caton; Roy Billing; Steve Bisley; and Claudia Karvan.

== Architectural heritage in the area ==
Under the Randwick Local Environment Plan 2012 a number of buildings in the vicinity of The Spot are listed as heritage items and the immediate locale a designated Heritage Conservation Area. Buildings within the Heritage Conservation Area around The Spot include:

- 13 Lee Street - an Edwardian residence built c 1910 (item I402)
- 84 Perouse Road - a two-storey Federation house (item I424)
- 85 Perouse Road - a Federation Bungalow built c. 1915 (item I425)
- 106 Perouse Road - a Federation Period Queen Anne cottage (item I427)
- 108 and 110 Perouse Road - two Federation Period Queen Anne cottages (item I428)
- 15 St Pauls Street - a Victorian terrace house (item I443)
- 17 St Pauls Street - a Federation Period cottage (item I444)
- 19 St Pauls Street - a Victorian Italianate terrace house (item I445)
- 25-27 St Pauls Street - two Victorian Italianate terrace houses (item I446)
- Ritz Cinema is designated a heritage item of 'State significance' (item I447)
- 42 St Pauls Street - Pan Arcadian House, formerly the Masonic Temple (item I448)

== Gallery ==
The Ritz Cinema by day.

Pan Arcadian House by night.

A row of businesses along St Pauls Street.

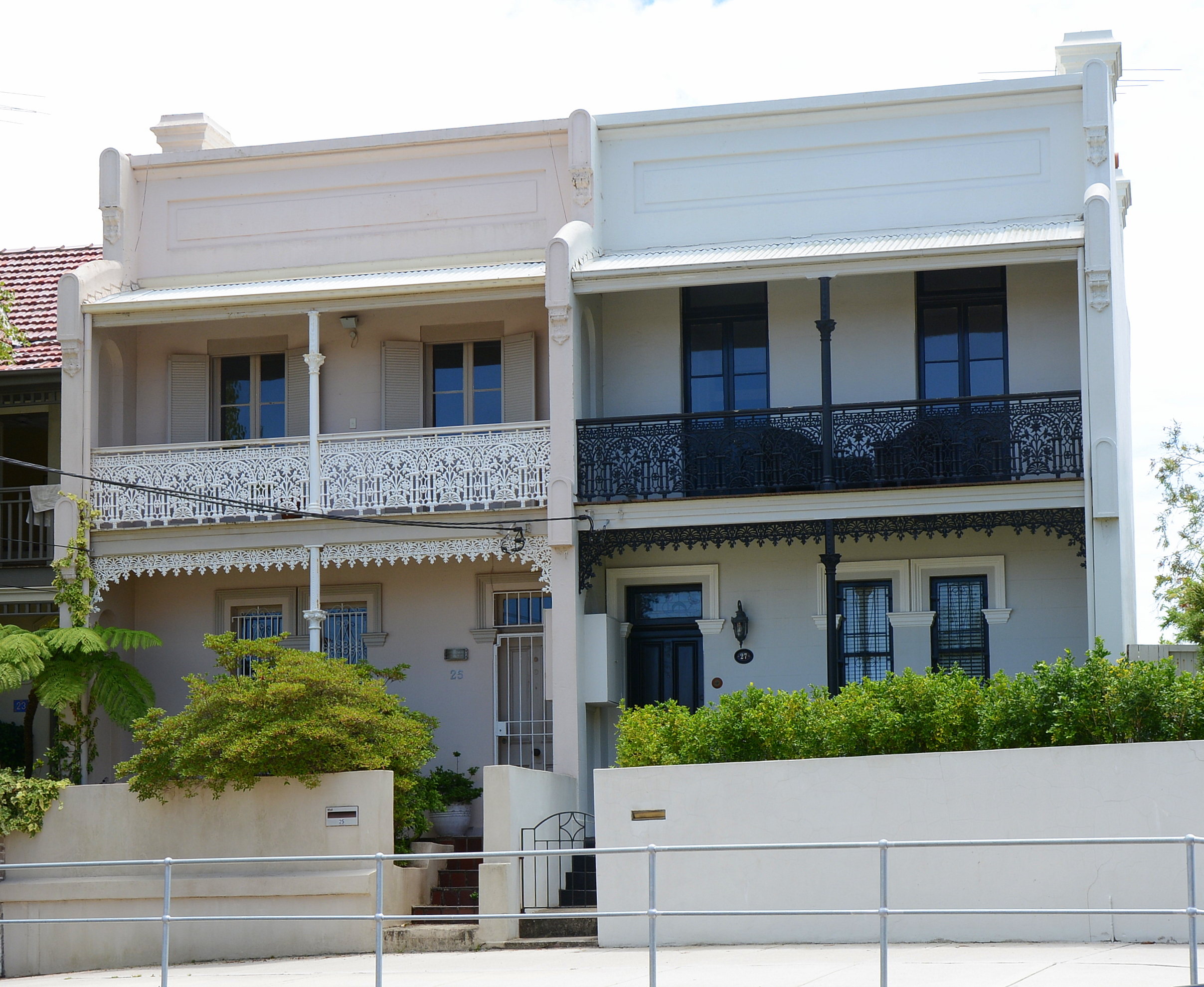
Italianate terrace houses, 25-27 St Pauls Street

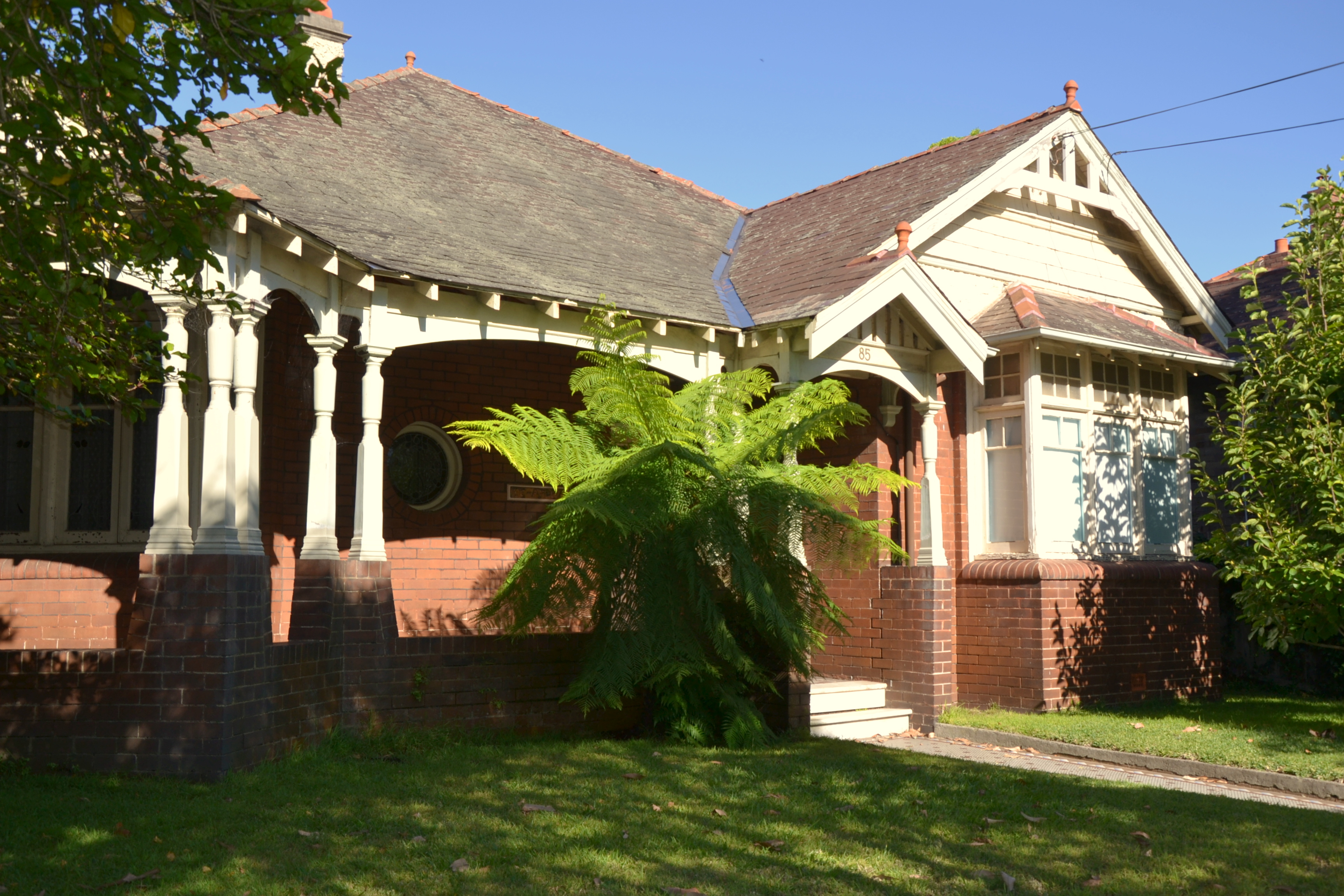
Federation Bungalow, 85 Perouse Road

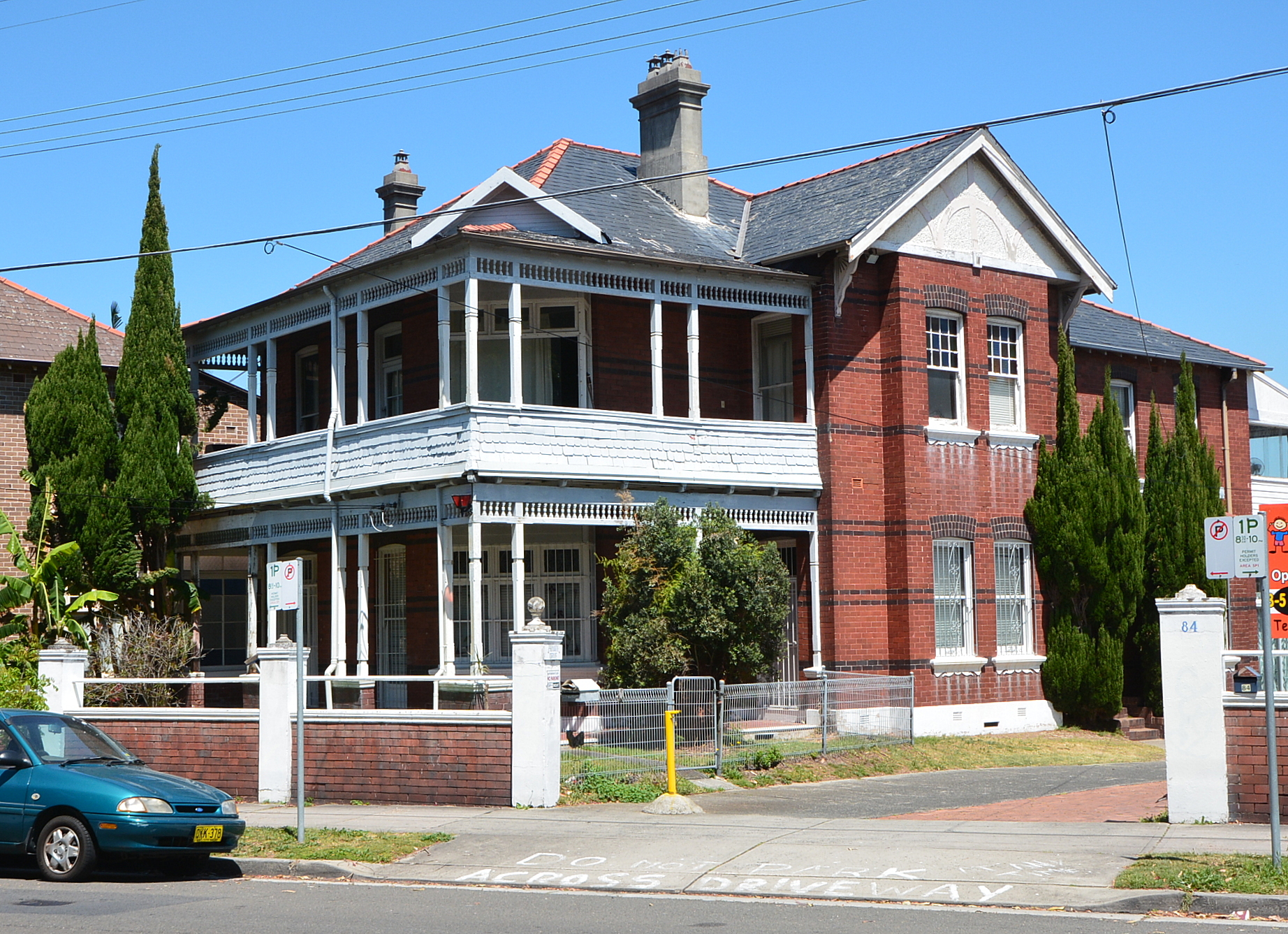
Federation house, 84 Perouse Road
