= Michael Caton =

Australian actor (born 1943)

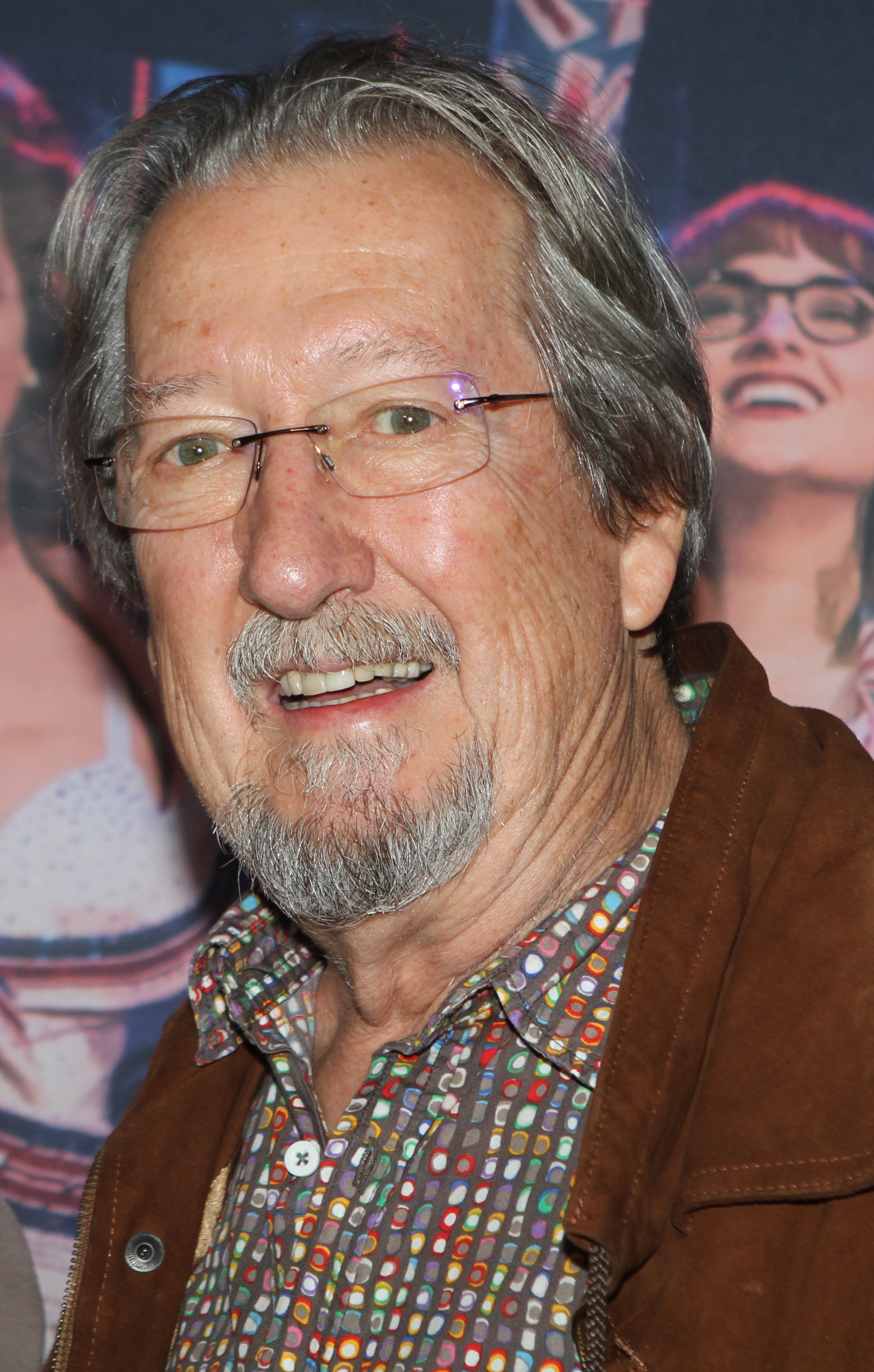
- Caton in 2017
- Born: 21 July 1943 (age 83); Monto, Queensland, Australia
- Occupations: Actor, comedian, television presenter
- Years active: 1969–present
- Known for: The Sullivans; Chances; Packed To The Rafters; The Castle
- Spouse: Helen Esakoff (m. 2002)

Michael Caton (born 21 July 1943) is an Australian actor, comedian and television host, best known for playing Uncle Harry in the Australian television series The Sullivans, Darryl Kerrigan in 1997's low-budget hit film The Castle, and Ted Taylor in the television series Packed to the Rafters.

== Early life ==
Caton was born in Monto, Queensland, was educated in Gympie at St Patrick's College, a Boarding School, where he had his first experience as an actor, and then grew up in Woolloongabba, Brisbane.

== Media career ==
=== Television ===
In 1976, Caton starred as Uncle Harry Sullivan in the long running Channel 9 war family drama The Sullivans.

Caton starred in the Australian drama series Five Mile Creek from 1983 until 1985. He then appeared in the risqué 1990s soap opera Chances (in 1991 and 1992).

Since 1999, Caton has hosted two lifestyle programs – Hot Property and Hot Auctions – on the Seven Network until 2009, and Channel Nine since 2010.

In 2005, he was a contestant on the third series of the Australian version of Dancing with the Stars.

He was in the Channel 7 dramedy Packed to the Rafters, playing Ted Taylor, father of Julie Rafter, and grandfather to all the grandchildren and their partners.

Caton works with the Queensland rugby league team as 'cultural ambassador', a role which he inherited from deceased long-time team manager Dick Turner.

== Filmography ==
=== Television ===
Year	Title	Role	Notes
1969	Skippy	Young Man	1 episode (#3.83 El Toro)
1970	Division 4	Steve	1 episode (#69 The Man from Lightning Ridge)
1970–74	Homicide	Bruce Perkins / Ambrose	2 episodes (#247 A Time for Grieving / No. 403 A Thing of the Past)
1974	Ryan	Claude	1 episode (#1.37 Goodbye Holly Beckett)
1976	King's Men	Joey Oslow	1 episode (#1.10 Public Enemy Number 1)
1976–81	The Sullivans	Uncle Harry Sullivan	737 episodes
1981–1984	Cop Shop	Andrew Coucher, Bill Watson, Sid Miller	4 episodes episodes 343, 344, 384, 525
	Holiday Island	Charlie Watson	TV series, 1 episode
1982–93	A Country Practice	Max Grainger / Dwayne, Trev & Lennie Kerby / Clive Bradley / Malcolm Fellows	8 episodes
1983	The Weekly's War	Les Haylen	TV miniseries
1983–85	Five Mile Creek	Paddy Malone	38 episodes
1987	The Flying Doctors	Noel Farley	1 episode (#2.22 Every Day a Gift)
1988	Home and Away	Barry Davenport	2 episodes (#1.61/#1.63)
1988	Hey Dad..!	Chris Gordon	1 episode (#2.33 VW for Sale)
1991	Chances	Bill Anderson	127 episodes (main cast)
1993	Paradise Beach	Ken Hayden	1 episode (#1.139)
1996	G.P.	Michael Ree	1 episode (#8.7 New Confusions)
1997	Heartbreak High	Barney	1 episode (#4.24)
1997	Blue Heelers	Ken Norse	1 episode (#4.6 Fowl Play)
1998	Wildside	Brian Savini	1 episode (#1.15)
1998	All Saints	Bob Parkin	6 episodes
1999	Stingers	Benny	1 episode (#1.11 Ten Feet Tall and Bullet Proof)
1999–current	Hot Property / Hot Auctions	Himself	Host
1999	All-Star Squares	Self	Panellist
2000	The Track	Voice over	TV documentary
2001	Always Greener	Jack	1 episode (#1.8 Dog Days)
2002	Dossa and Joe	Joe Bailey	6 episodes
2002–03	Bad Cop, Bad Cop	Detective Sergeant Red Lilywhite	8 episodes
2002	The Weakest Link	Self	Contestant – Celebrity Special episode
2003	The Fat	Self	1 episode (#6.16)
2005	Dancing with the Stars	Self	5 episodes, series 3
2006	How the Hell Did We Get Here?	Self	2 episodes
2008–2013	Packed to the Rafters	Ted Taylor	111 episodes
2018	Underbelly Files: Chopper	Keith Read	2 episodes
2021	Back to the Rafters	Ted Taylor	6 episodes

=== Film ===
Year	Film	Role	Notes
1972	Private Collection		
1979	The Last of the Knucklemen	Monk	
1981	Hoodwink	Shapley	
1982	Fluteman	Oswald Snaith	
1982	Monkey Grip	Clive	
1986	Great Expectations, the Untold Story	Travis	TV movie
1988	The 13th Floor	Dr. Fletcher	
1988	Joe Wilson	Dave Regan	TV mini-series
1990	The Paper Man	Leonard Webb	TV mini-series
1990	Shadows of the Heart	Frank Barrett	TV movie
1996	The Thorn Birds: The Missing Years	Bill Masters	TV movie
1997	The Castle	Darryl Kerrigan	
1998	Never Tell Me Never	Max Shepherd	TV movie
1998	13 Gantry Row	Mr Hob	TV movie
1998	The Echo of Thunder	Bill Gadrey	TV movie
1998	The Interview	Barry Walls	
2001	The Animal	Dr Wilder	
2004	Strange Bedfellows	Ralph Williams	
2015	Last Cab to Darwin	Rex	
2017	Three Summers	Henry	
2020	Rams	Les	

== Stage ==
Year	Title	Role	Notes
1971	Hair		Melbourne
1972	Jesus Christ Superstar	Priest	
1973	The Tooth of Crime		Nimrod Theatre Company
1982	The Stripper	Sheriff Lavers	Sydney Theatre Company
2007–08	Priscilla Queen of the Desert - the Musical	Bob	

== Video games ==
Year	Title	Role	Notes
2022	Wayward Strand	Neil	

== Discography ==
Caton, playing the role of a Priest, is part of the Chorus singing on the original Australian cast recording of Jesus Christ Superstar, 1972. He is the major voice talking in the background on John Paul Young's 1975 hit "Yesterday's Hero". From Caton's role in the movie he sings on many tracks on Ed Kuepper – Last Cab to Darwin – Original Motion Picture Soundtrack, 2015.

== Accolades ==
=== Honours ===
Caton has been inducted into the Australian Film Walk of Fame in honour of his work in Australia's cinema and television industries.

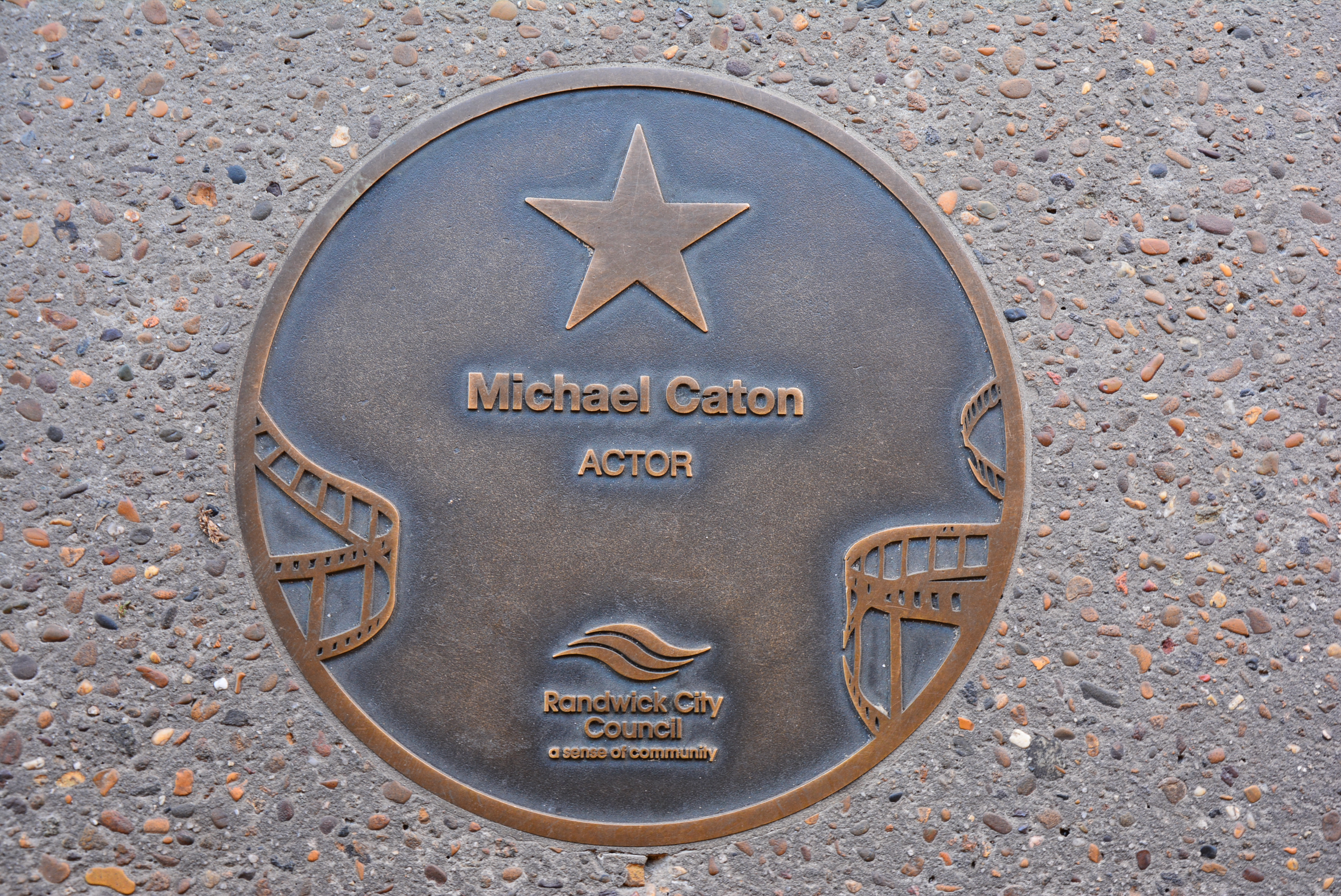
Caton's plaque at the Australian Film Walk of Fame, Ritz Cinema, Randwick, Sydney

=== Awards & nominations ===
Year	Association	Category	Nominated work	Result
2007	Australian Film Institute	Best Actor in a Television Drama	The Castle	Nominated
2011	Logie Awards	Logie Award for Most Popular Actor	Packed to the Rafters	Won
2016	AACTA Awards	Best Lead Actor	Last Cab to Darwin	Won

== Personal life ==
Caton is married to Helen Esakoff. His son Septimus narrates My Kitchen Rules and Robot Wars.
