= Australian Druglords =

Australian documentary television series

Australian Druglords (also known as Under Surveillance: Australian Druglords) is an Australian documentary television series on the Nine Network hosted by actor Gary Sweet. Australian Druglords gives an insight into some of Australia's biggest druglords from inside the New South Wales Police drug squad, with unprecedented access to confidential police files.

== Episodes ==
Season 1

- Episode 1 – Richard Buttrose
- Episode 2 – Drew & Nathan Baggaley
- Episode 3 – Wayne Patterson
- Episode 4 – Shane Oien
- Episode 5 – Shayne Hatfield
- Episode 6 – Yonky Tan
- Episode 7 – Samir Rafahi
- Episode 8 – John Griffiths
- Episode 9 – Duc & Van Dang
- Episode 10 - Charlotte Lindstrom

== See also ==
- Australian Families of Crime
