= Trouble in Paradise (1989 film) =

- Written by: Robert Sherman; Ben Marshall
- Directed by: Di Drew
- Starring: Raquel Welch; Jack Thompson; Nicholas Hammond
- Music by: Chris Neal
- Countries of origin: Australia; United States
- Original language: English

Production
- Producer: Robert A. Halmi
- Cinematography: David Connell
- Editor: John Scott
- Running time: 89 mins
- Production company: Qintex Production

Original release
- Release: 1989

Trouble in Paradise is a 1989 Australian TV movie directed by Di Drew and starring Raquel Welch, Jack Thompson, and Nicholas Hammond.

== Plot ==
After her husband Arthur mysteriously dies, Rachel Baxley leaves behind her life in Hong Kong and boards a ship to the States, with her husband’s casket. When a typhoon hits and the ship breaks apart, Rachel finds herself marooned on a desert island with crew member Jake Fontaine, and the pair eventually fall in love. Rachel is stunned when Arthur – who as it turns out, is not dead after all – arrives on the island with his heroin smuggling partners. When chaos ensues, Jake takes on the smugglers and rescues Rachel.

== Cast ==
- Raquel Welch as Rachel
- Jack Thompson as Jake
- Nicholas Hammond as Arthur
- John Gregg as Seth
- Anthony Wong as Ringe
- Ralph Cotterill as Hughes

== Production ==
The film was shot on location, just south of Sydney in Australia.

Love scenes between Welch and Thompson were cut, causing Welch to protest. "They just want to make it into pap because they're scared about this, that, everything" said Welch. "I've shot a million love scenes. I've never heard of anything like this.

The film marked a change of pace for Welch after a number of more serious roles. It was one of several movies where Thompson played the romantic male lead to an American star.
