= Dick Turner =

Australian rugby league footballer, coach & administrator

Personal information
- Full name: Richard Turner
- Born: 19 August 1932
- Died: 16 June 2008 (aged 75)

Playing information
Club
Years	Team	Pld	T	G	FG	P
	Brisbane Norths	0	0	0	0	0
	Redcliffe Dolphins	0	0	0	0	0
	Total	0	0	0	0	0

Coaching information
Club
Years	Team	Gms	W	D	L	W%
1968–69	Redcliffe Dolphins	42	17	1	24	40
- As of 24 Sep 2021

Richard Turner (19 August 1932 – 16 June 2008), a.k.a. "Tosser", was a rugby league manager.

Turner was born in 1932 and played in the Brisbane Rugby League competition for Brisbane Norths and Redcliffe. He also coached Redcliffe in 1968 and 1969.

Turner was the Queensland state rugby league team's manager from 1982 until 1996, when he stepped down to take a role in the "Former Origin Greats" (FOGS) organisation. He was also the Australian team manager on the 1986 Kangaroo Tour of Great Britain.

He was also chairman of the South Queensland Crushers club during its entire existence from 1995 to 1997.

In 2008, during his battle with illness he wrote a letter for the Queensland rugby league team which has been read to them for inspiration in subsequent State of Origin series.

He died as chairman of FOGS on 16 June 2008 because of long-term illness. That year he won the "Service to Sport Award" at the Queensland Sport Awards.

Actor Michael Caton inherited Turner's cultural ambassador role with the Queensland rugby league team.

During the 2009 State of Origin series, he was honoured outside Lang Park with a plaque.
