= Hot Property (Australian TV series) =

- Also known as: Hot Auctions
- Starring: Michael Caton
- Country of origin: Australia
- Original language: English
- No. of seasons: 12
- No. of episodes: 200+

Production
- Producer: Beyond Television Productions
- Running time: 30mins (inc. adverts)

Original release
- Network: Seven Network (1999–2009); Nine Network (2010–2013)
- Release: 1999 – 2013

Related
- Hot Property (UK version)

Hot Property is an Australian real estate Channel Seven show that has aired since 1999. The program is hosted by actor Michael Caton. The half-hour show looks at problems Australians face when wanting to buy, build, renovate or rent homes. After a year off in 2006, the show returned in July 2007 on Sunday nights at 7pm. The premiere episode rated 1.3 million viewers and ranked 21 for the week. The show returned for a new season in 2008.

In 2010, the program moved to the Nine Network, Caton is returning as host and it is expected to be aired on 28 July 2010.

Hot Property returned to air in 2012 on Thursday 17 May at 8pm.

== Hot Auctions ==
Between 2000 and 2003, the program changed its name to Hot Auctions, and focused more on the auction process rather than renovations. Each episode would traditionally contain up to three different auctions. In August 2003, the camera setup is now in HD video replacing normal video camera as the show was now used in some Seven Network shows such as Home and Away and Ground Force.
