= Australian Film Walk of Fame =

Collection of plaques on the footpath outside the Ritz Cinema in Sydney

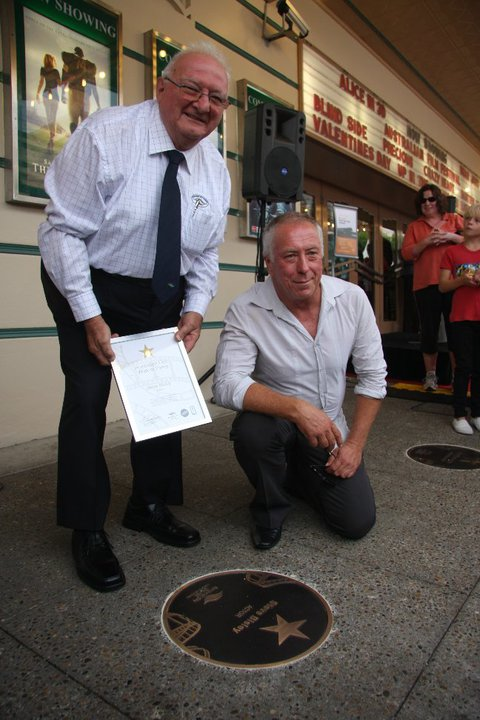
- Steve Bisley at the 2010 Australian Film Walk of Fame with Randwick Mayor Cr. John Procopiadis

The Australian Film Walk of Fame is a collection of plaques on the footpath outside the Ritz Cinema in the suburb of Randwick, Sydney, Australia. Formed in 2008 at the Ritz Cinema, the initiative was established to honour Australian actors and actresses for their contributions to Australian cinema.

== History ==
The Australian Film Walk of Fame was initially established in 2008 by Randwick City Council and the Australian Film Festival (organised by Barry Watterson) at the Ritz Cinema, Randwick under the title of the "Walk of Fame".

The first recipient inducted into the Walk of Fame was Charles 'Bud' Tingwell in 2008. Joining his name in being honoured in 2009, were actors Michael Caton and Roy Billing, with Federal Minister for the Arts and Midnight Oil frontman, Peter Garrett performing the ceremony.

In conjunction with the inaugural Australian Film Festival, which premiered on 24 February 2010 at the Randwick Ritz, the Randwick Ritz's Walk of Fame was officially renamed the Australian Film Walk of Fame.

On 7 March 2010, the festival concluded with The Spot Food and Film Festival at Randwick and the induction of Steve Bisley and Claudia Karvan to the Walk of Fame.

From 2011, the Australian Film Walk of Fame initiated new members annually at the conclusion of the Australian Film Festival, in partnership with Randwick Council, the Ritz Cinema, and The Spot Chamber of Commerce. On 13 March 2011, Gary Sweet and Jack Thompson were both initiated to the Walk of Fame.

The last Australian film festival was held in March 2012. Actors Deborah Mailman and Barry Otto were honoured with plaques on the Walk of Fame that year, where 20,000 people attended the festival, which also hosted live music and dance performances.

On 28 April 2022, the Australian Film Walk of Fame was revived after a decade with a new plaque unveiled to honour actor, writer, and director Leah Purcell at the official gala screening of The Drover's Wife: The Legend of Molly Johnson at Randwick Ritz Cinemas.

Sigrid Thornton was inducted into the Walk of Fame as part of Sydney premiere of Slant at Ritz Cinema, on 26 July 2023.

On 19 February 2025 David Wenham, was inducted into the Walk of Fame at a special screening of Spit at the Ritz Cinemas, hosted by Randwick City Council.

In June 2025, film critics and television personalities David Stratton and Margaret Pomeranz became the first non-actors and first duo to be honoured with a plaque on the Walk of Fame at a special Australian Film Walk of Fame ceremony. The ceremony focussed on 28 years of The Movie Show and At the Movies, featuring memorable reviews and bloopers. Stratton, who was director of the Sydney Film Festival for nearly 20 years, died on 14 August 2025; the ceremony was his final public appearance.

== Description ==
The Australian Film Walk of Fame was established to honour Australian actors and actresses for their contributions to Australian cinema. It comprises a collection of commemorative plaques on the footpath outside the Ritz Cinema in Randwick.

Randwick Council and Barry Watterson jointly own the trademark rights to the Australian Film Walk of Fame plaque design.

== Members of the Australian Film Walk of Fame ==
Year of Induction	Recipient
2008	Charles Tingwell
2009	Michael Caton; Roy Billing
2010	Claudia Karvan; Steve Bisley
2011	Gary Sweet; Jack Thompson
2012	Barry Otto; Deborah Mailman
2022	Leah Purcell
2023	Sigrid Thornton
2025	David Wenham; David Stratton; Margaret Pomeranz
