= Sudden Impact (TV series) =

- Genre: Observational Documentary
- Narrated by: Gary Sweet
- Country of origin: Australia
- Original language: English
- No. of seasons: 1
- No. of episodes: 8

Original release
- Network: Nine Network
- Release: 9 December 2008 – 27 January 2009

Sudden Impact is an Australian observational documentary series that airs on the Nine Network. It debuted on 9 December 2008 at 8pm. The program was developed in association with the Transport Accident Commission (TAC), and is narrated by Gary Sweet. The program is largely set in Victoria. The series is similar to the New Zealand based show Serious Crash Unit and Seven Network's Crash Investigation Unit.
