= How the Hell Did We Get Here? =

How the Hell Did We Get Here? is an Australian television program on ABC1, subtitled The Baby Boomer's Guide To Big Events. It is an interview and clip show where Australian celebrities of the baby boomer generation tell of their experiences as baby boomers and clips are shown. Each episode is themed, such as baby boomers music, etc.
