= Ritz Cinema, Randwick =

Ritz Cinema
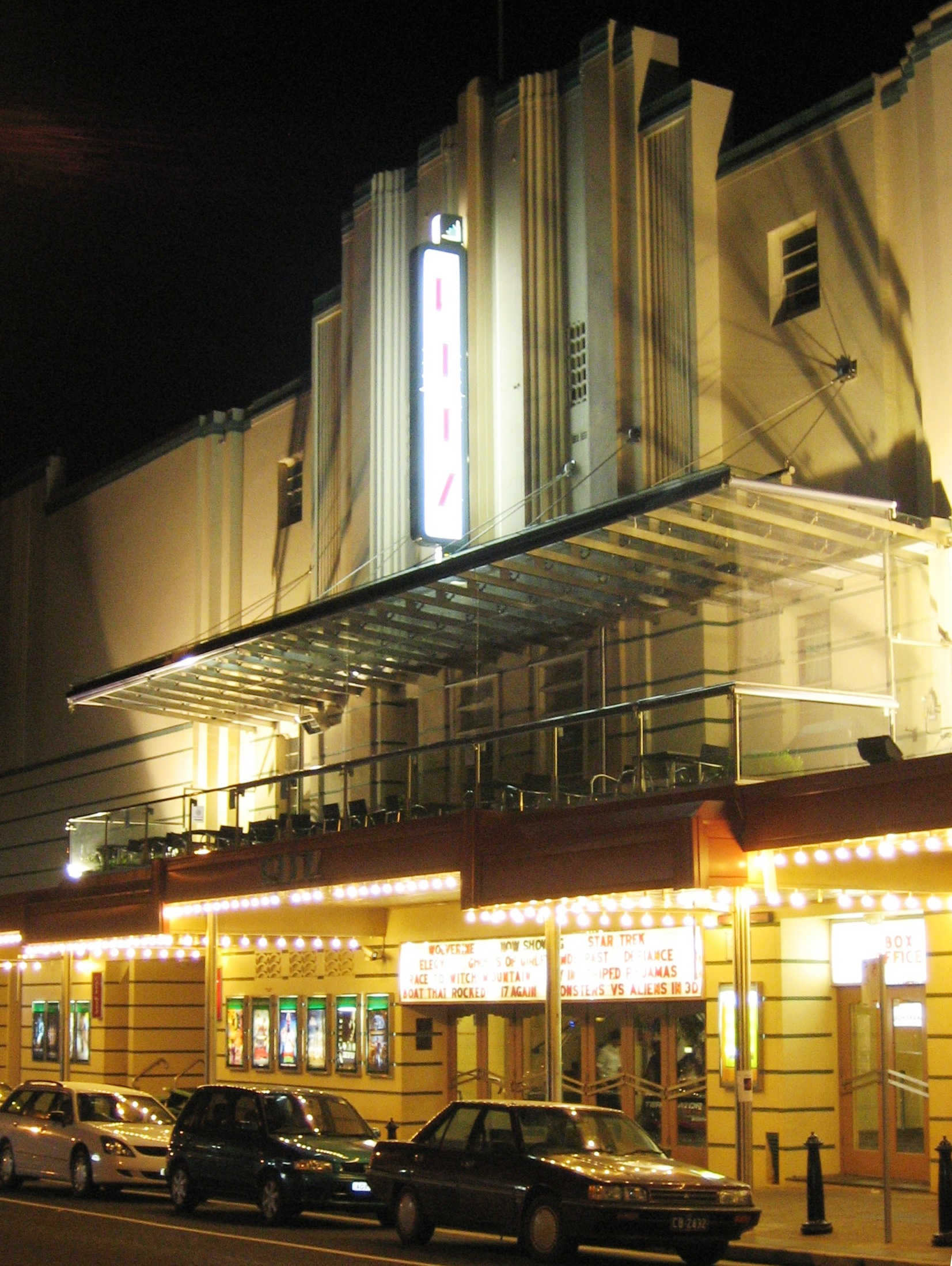
- The Ritz Cinema, pictured in 2009

- Location within inner Sydney
- 33°55′12″S 151°14′36″E
- Location: 43 St Pauls Street, Randwick, New South Wales, Australia

History
- Built: 1937

Site notes
- Architect: Aaron Bolot
- Architectural style: Inter-war Art Deco

New South Wales Heritage Register
- Official name: Ritz Theatre; Ritz Cinema
- Type: State heritage (built)
- Designated: 2 April 1999
- Reference no.: 348
- Type: Cinema
- Category: Recreation and Entertainment
- Builders: C. & B. J. Williams

The Ritz Cinema, also known as the Ritz Theatre, is a heritage-listed cinema located at 43 St Pauls Street, in the Sydney suburb of Randwick, New South Wales, Australia. It was designed by Aaron Bolot and built in 1937 by C. & B. J. Williams. It was added to the New South Wales State Heritage Register on 2 April 1999. The architect, Aaron Bolot, is known for his classic art deco buildings throughout Sydney, such as his commissions for grand apartment buildings in Potts Point.

== History ==
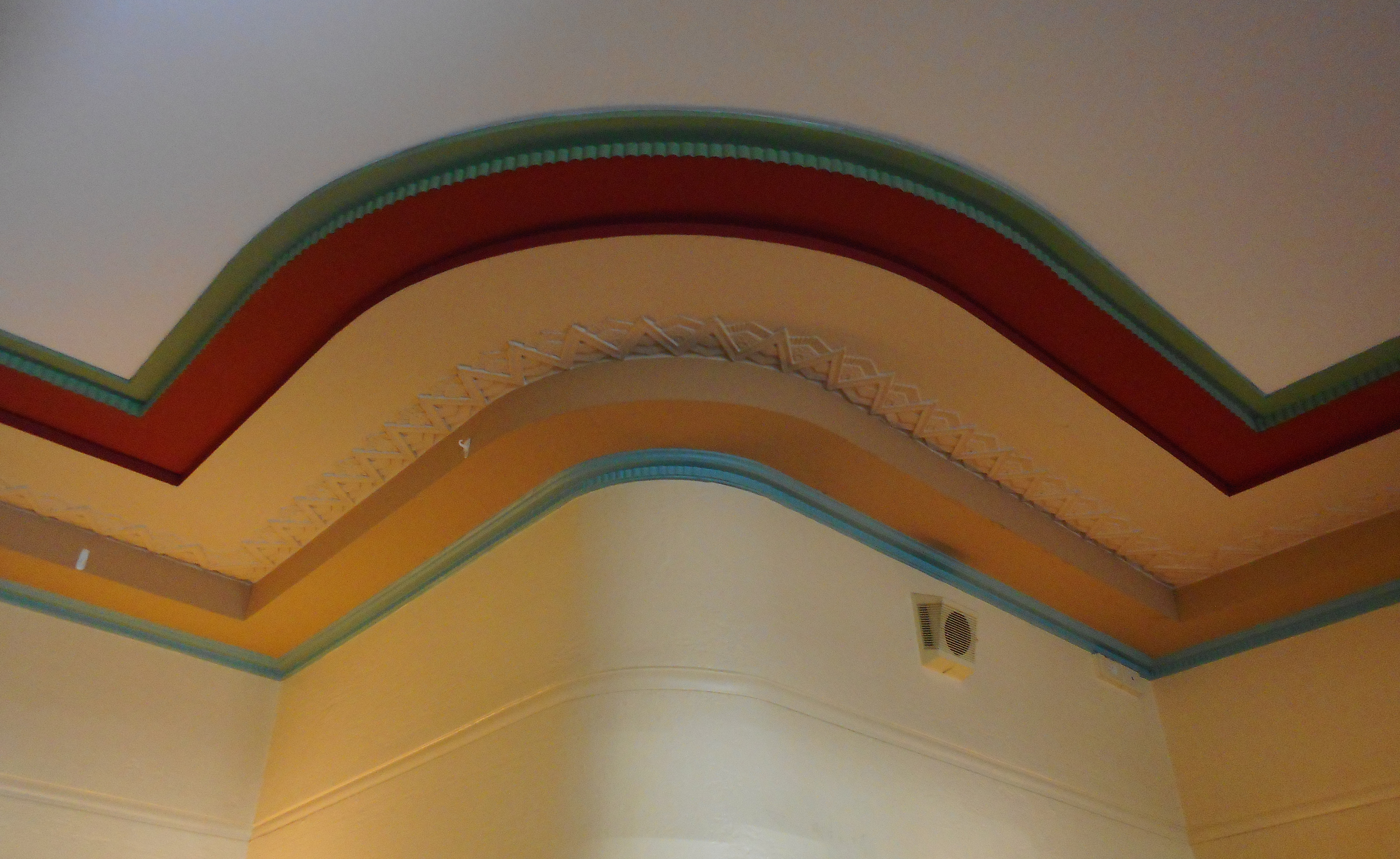
Part of the Art Deco interior at The Ritz

The Ritz was designed by architectural designer Aaron Bolot in 1937 for Randwick Estate Limited at the same time he designed The Regal Theatre in Gosford.

Since its construction, the cinema has been owned by, among others, the Hoyts cinema group and the Brigidine Sisters (an order of nuns running the adjacent Brigidine College). In the late 1980s the current owners planned to demolish the existing cinema and to redevelop the site. However, Randwick City Council and the then Minister for Planning intervened and a Permanent Conservation Order was imposed on the Ritz building in March, 1993. The current owners refurbished the building in the late 1990s, adding additional cinemas to the original single principal cinema theatre in order to allow the Ritz to survive in the era of competition with larger multiplex cinema chains.

== Description ==
The Ritz is constructed of brick with a galvanised iron roof supported on angle steel trusses. It has seating capacity of about 900.

The Ritz was built on two levels in the Inter-war Art Deco linear geometric style. The rendered facade reflects the early skyscraper style concept with a strong vertical emphasis expressed by vertical linear ribbing and reeding, as well as the stepped parapet. This feeling of strong verticality was even further emphasised by the deliberate stepping of the street awning over the entrance foyer doors. The awning itself retains its original pressed metal soffit, or underside lining, which is wholly decorated with characteristic geometric Art Deco motifs in a regular repeated pattern.

The Art Deco linear geometric style is relieved internally by curved walls to the main stair, half landing and curved corners in the foyer and first floor lounge. The auditorium is distinctive through its Art Deco lights in two panels of nine wall lights to either side of the screen and the continuous ground glass box lighting with its chevron motif. The plaster decoration to the walls and ceiling is in geometric patterns in low relief with extensive use of grills and reveals. The detailing to the gilded plaster speaker boxes, which flank the main screen is particularly fine.

=== Australian Film Walk of Fame ===
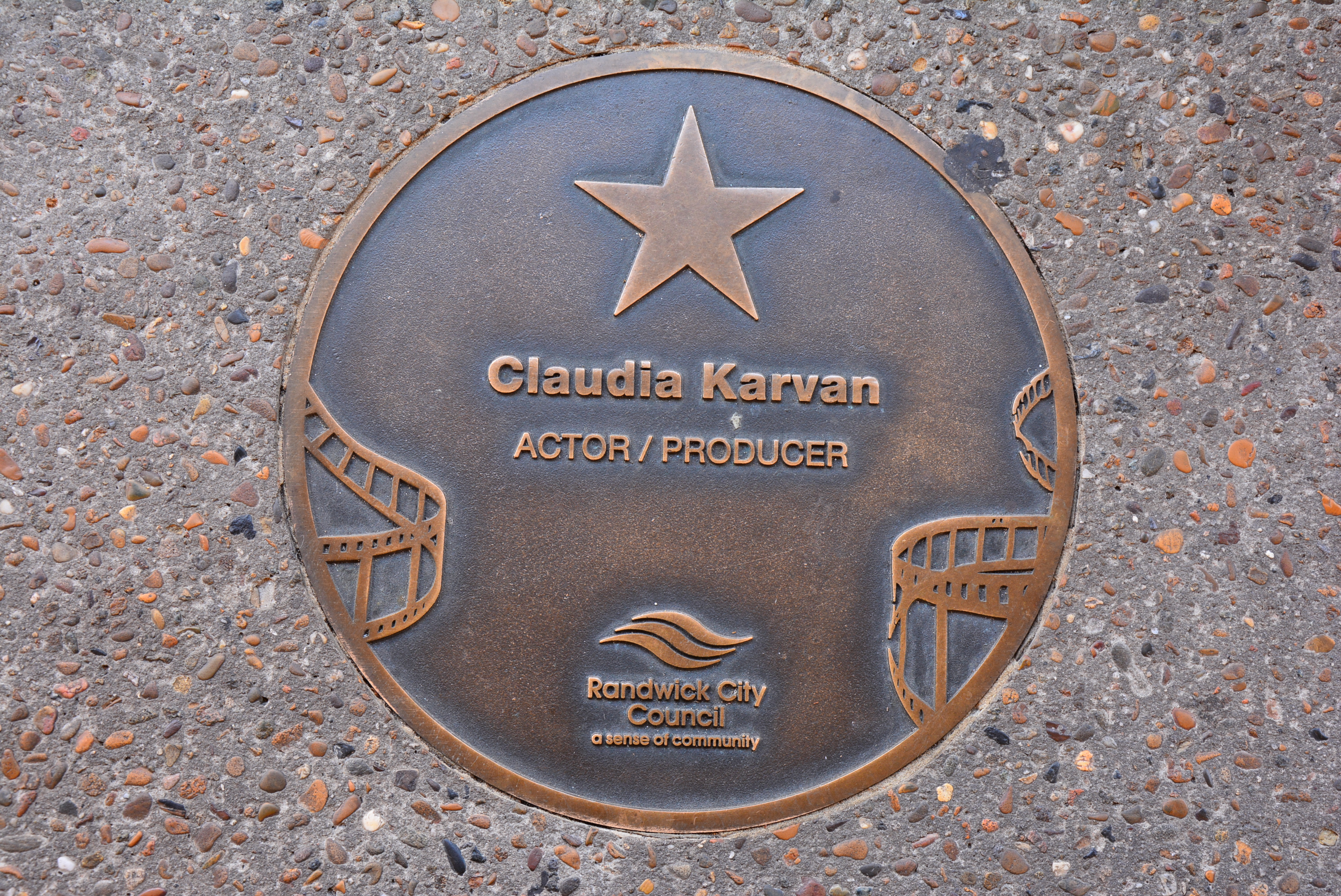
One of the plaques in the Australian Film Walk of Fame outside The Ritz

In 2008, the Australian Film Walk of Fame was created outside the Ritz, with plaques honouring members of the Australian film industry. The walk was initiated by Randwick Council, with support from the Coogee Arts Festival and The Ritz.

=== Condition ===
As at 1 October 1997, the physical condition is good. Archaeological potential is low.

=== Modifications and dates ===
Built in 1937. Alterations made about 1954 to accommodate a wide screen. Interior redecorated around 1963.

== Heritage listing ==
Ritz Theatre was listed on the New South Wales State Heritage Register on 2 April 1999 having satisfied the following criteria.

=== Register of the National Estate (defunct) ===
In 1997, The Ritz was placed on the (now defunct) Register of the National Estate by the Australian Heritage Council. That (defunct) record notes that:

The Ritz Cinema is the only one of three remaining theatres of this style in an unaltered state still used as a cinema in New South Wales and is one of the few surviving examples of the hundreds of cinemas which were built during the 1930s, one of the most creative periods of cinematic design in Australia. ... The Ritz, which has operated almost continuously as a movie theatre since 1937, has social values as a community cultural entertainment centre in the Randwick area. The place is also highly valued by the Art Deco Society. ... The Ritz is significant for its intact and well detailed Art Deco design and is a prominent element in the St Paul's Road urban precinct ...

== See also ==
- Australian non-residential architectural styles
