= Claudia Leigh =

- City Homicide character
- First appearance: "Rage"; 22 March 2009
- Last appearance: "In Harm's Way"; 25 August 2010
- Created by: John Hugginson; John Banas
- Portrayed by: Tasma Walton

In-universe information
- Title: Detective Senior Sergeant
- Occupation: Criminal profiler Psychologist

Claudia Leigh is a fictional character from the Australian television drama City Homicide, played by Tasma Walton. Shortly after the actress relocated to Melbourne, she was approached by producer MaryAnne Carroll to appear in the series. Carroll asked Walton whether she would be interested in a recurring role. Walton had previously turned down several acting jobs, while waiting for the right one to come along and she was cautious about taking the City Homicide role. She revealed that she did not want a repeat of her Blue Heelers character Dash McKinley. However, Walton was immediately interested in Claudia's job as a criminal profiler and her semi-regular status. Walton's casting was announced on 1 February 2009 and she made her debut screen appearance in the second season episode "Rage", which was broadcast on 22 March 2009.

Claudia Leigh is a criminal profiler and psychologist. As profiling is not a big department within the Australian police force, dramatic licence was taken with Claudia and it was stated that she came up through the detective ranks, before becoming a specialised criminal psychologist. Walton explained that Claudia is fascinated with the workings of the criminal mind and comes from an intellectual approach. Walton described her as a pretty straightforward and assertive character. A major storyline for Claudia saw her tasked with putting together a profile for a case featuring a serial rapist, who has murdered one of his victims. Claudia unsuccessfully tries to get a confession from the prime suspect Daniel Worthington (Martin Sacks), before he is bailed. Daniel later follows Claudia home and attacks her. Walton said portraying the scenes was "challenging and required a strong level of emotional intensity".

== Casting ==
On 1 February 2009, Luke Dennehy reported Walton had joined the cast of City Homicide as semi-regular character Claudia Leigh. Dennehy observed Walton last had a regular television job as Dash McKinley in Blue Heelers, a role she quit in 1999. The actress had turned down several acting offers, while waiting for the right part to come along. Shortly after she relocated to Melbourne, Walton was approached by producer MaryAnne Carroll to appear on City Homicide. Carroll inquired whether Walton would be interested in a recurring role. The actress was initially cautious about accepting as she did not want a repeat of the Dash character. Walton revealed "After three years of Heelers I decided that I didn't want to do a regular gig again. The beauty of Claudia Leigh is that she comes and goes." At the time of her casting announcement, Walton had already filmed one episode and would be filming more in the coming weeks. She later commented that she enjoyed her time on City Homicide and said her character was "really nice".

== Development ==
"Claudia is fascinated with the workings of the criminal mind and can remain detached from what she discovers. She's very curious about how people are driven to those sorts of crimes."

— Walton on Claudia

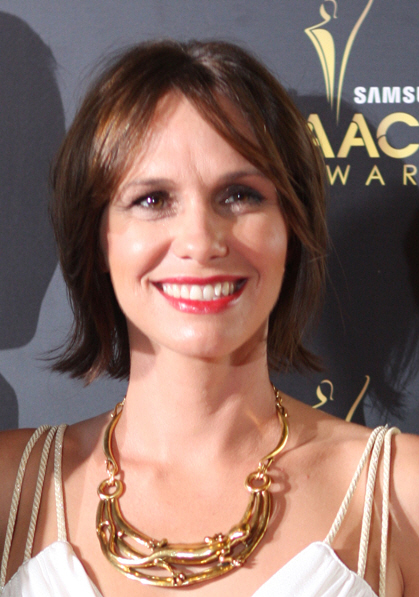
Tasma Walton portrayed Claudia Leigh from 2009 to 2010.

Detective Senior Sergeant Claudia Leigh is a criminal profiler and psychologist. Walton was immediately interested in the part because Claudia's job is not a straightforward police role. She said that it was something that is intellectual and different from her previous acting parts, saying "Claudia is a very different character. Dash (on Heelers) was quite impetuous, impulsive. Claudia is almost the polar opposite. She considers what she needs to say and comes from an intellectual approach." The difference between Walton's Blue Heelers character and Claudia was part of the reason the role appealed to her, adding that she did not want to get back into a uniform again. Walton also liked that her character comes and goes, as the homicide team do not always need a profiler, so she works elsewhere in the building and then comes in when the squad need a different angle on a case.

Walton became "very attracted" to Claudia's role as a profiler because the job approaches criminals from "a different perspective. Unlike the other cast members, Walton did not get to work with people who do her character's job in real life. She told a TV Week writer that profiling is not a big department within the Australian police force, and explained: "Usually what happens is you have detectives who do that sort of psychology work, but who also do something else, such as ballistics or forensics. We've taken a little bit of dramatic licence with Claudia. She's come up through the detective ranks but she's now a highly specialised criminal psychologist." Walton told a Who magazine writer that her character talks a lot and uses police jargon, so she had to learn large amounts of dialogue. She told the writer that if she had been on a morning shoot and was later asked about her lines, she would not be able to remember them. Walton stated that there would not be any romance for Claudia, saying "She's a pretty straightforward, assertive character, but still very feminine. She just comes in, does her job, then leaves."

Following her introduction, Claudia plays an important part in a case that involves Bernice Waverley (Noni Hazlehurst). Ahead of the third season premiere in August 2009, it was confirmed that Claudia would be "popping up" throughout the season. A few weeks into Season 3, Claudia is brought into Simon Joyner's (Daniel MacPherson) final storyline before his exit. Simon is badly affected by Duncan Freeman's (Aaron Pedersen) near-fatal beating at the end of the previous season and becomes a vigilante. His "tightly wound state" catches Claudia's attention and she arranges for him to have counselling. However, Simon manages to "pull the wool over Claudia's eyes" as the sessions are not as effective as he leads her to believe. MacPherson said his character thinks he is fine, but he is starting to notice things "slipping beyond his grasp" and can no longer control his emotions.

In July 2010, the character is at the forefront of a storyline involving a serial rapist, played by Walton's former Blue Heelers co-star Martin Sacks. The homicide team investigate the rape and murder of a young businesswoman in her home, Detectives Nick Buchanan (John Adam) and Duncan Freeman deduce that the attacker was wearing a mask and used chloroform to over power the woman, before killing her with scissors. Walton explained that as there is "very little physical evidence" left at the crime scene, her character is called in to build a profile of the suspect and his motives. The profile leads the team to businessman Daniel Worthington (Sacks). Walton told Carolyn Stewart of TV Week: "Claudia has him pegged from the start as a man with deep misogynistic tendencies and dangerous issues when it comes to women who dominate him." Stewart reported that the team are able to get another victim to identify Daniel, but his wife and daughter provide him with "a watertight alibi" stalling the case. The detectives then learn that Daniel is due to leave the country for a new job in two days. The deadline prompts Claudia to "play hard ball", and with the knowledge that his three previous victims were "assertive and successful women", she tries to provoke a reaction in Daniel by assuming the role of someone who will unsettle him.

Of her character's actions, Walton told Stewart: "Claudia's plan is to confront him in an interview situation with what he despises – a strong woman who tries to dominate and belittle him – in the hope that this will make him reveal his true nature." Walton reckoned that there are moments where it looks like Daniel is going to crack, but the detectives are left frustrated when he does not. Claudia remains convinced the attacks are related to something in Daniel's past, with Walton saying "In the interview room, she sees tiny glimpses of the real Daniel, but unfortunately she isn't successful in getting a confession, so he walks free." Walton also said that Claudia's instincts and psychological training tell her that Daniel fits the profile. Stewart described Claudia as "defeated" when she leaves the team to go home, where she is ambushed by "a seething" Daniel, who covers her head with a plastic bag and knocks her out with chloroform. She wakes to find herself tied to her bed and Daniel cutting off her dress with scissors. Walton explained that in that moment, Claudia's life is threatened and none of her colleagues know the danger she is in because they believe Daniel is on a flight out of the country.

Speaking with Darren Devlyn of The Daily Telegraph, Walton told him that the scenes portraying Claudia's attack were "challenging and required a strong level of emotional intensity over a long period of time." During filming, Walton admitted that she realised that there had been many women in Claudia's situation in real life, which she called "truly frightening and tragic." The storyline marked the first time Walton and Sacks had worked together since their time in the police drama Blue Heelers. Walton admitted that it was "fantastic" to be working with Sacks, and while the scenes were challenging, they were made easier to film because she was working with someone she trusted and was relaxed around. She stated "Filming these sorts of scenes can be tiring. You need to sustain a high emotional intensity over a long period of time, but it was made so much easier by working with Martin. Surprisingly, we had a lot of laughs." The storyline concludes with Detective Jennifer Mapplethorpe (Nadine Garner) arriving to see Claudia and fighting with Daniel, before Claudia shoots him dead.

== Storylines ==
While leaving the homicide department, Claudia is approached by Simon Joyner (Daniel MacPherson), who asks for her opinion on a case involving a man who has deliberately run down a teenager. Claudia states that the man could have an impulse control problem or psychosis. She tells Simon that she will put a profile together for him later on. When Bernice Waverley's son, Josh Waverly (William Jarratt), is kidnapped by Billy Pierce (Simon Stone), Claudia briefs the team on the situation. She explains that Billy is a disturbed man, who perceives Bernice as the enemy. He believes she was responsible for his brother's sacking and subsequent suicide, so he wants her to suffer too. When Billy is brought in, Claudia guides Simon and Matt Ryan (Damien Richardson) through the interview. Claudia learns Duncan Freeman (Aaron Pedersen) has returned to full duties, after being beaten almost to death by two criminals, and confronts Sergeant Stanley Wolfe (Shane Bourne) about the decision. Stanley tells Claudia that he understands her reservations, but he feels it is the best way to proceed. Later that day, Stanley explains that Duncan is going to be fine, but that Simon needs her help. Claudia talks with him and gets him to speak to a colleague about his issues. Claudia reprimands Allie Kingston (Nadia Townsend) when she upsets a victim involved in the sex-slave trade. However, they later get the victim talking and the case is solved.

Claudia also advises the homicide squad on several cases, including; a murdered toddler who was last seen with two young boys, the deaths of a young couple at sea and a serial killer who has preyed on ten women over twelve years. Claudia helps Simon when he is framed for murder and investigated by Susan Blake (Georgie Parker) of the Ethical Standards Division. Claudia confronts Susan when she learns that she used her to manipulate Simon. Claudia later tells Simon that she believes he is suffering from vicarious syndrome. When a business woman is brutally raped and murdered, the homicide squad ask Claudia to out a profile together for their prime suspect, Daniel Worthington (Martin Sacks). Homicide has two days to find the evidence that he killed the woman and raped two others, before he leaves the country. Claudia interviews Daniel using psychology to get a confession, but fails. Daniel is bailed and he follows Claudia home and attacks her with chloroform and ties her to her bed. He admits to the murder and rape and goes to shower. Jennifer Mapplethorpe (Nadine Garner) arrives and she places her gun on the bed as she frees Claudia. Daniel returns and tries to attack Jennifer with a pair of scissors, but Claudia shoots him dead. Claudia later returns to work and helps the team in their investigations into the disappearance and murder of a young woman who vanished after a party and a suspect who has become a vigilante.

== Reception ==
Watching Claudia's first episode, Dianne Butler, writing for The Courier-Mail, said "I believe I'll also struggle to take Tasma Walton seriously after hearing her describe a suspect as extremely intelligent. It's her first episode on Sunday night, and the series' last. She plays a police profiler. Police profilers are very big in television, you'd know that. You could say they're extremerly popular." While commenting on the team, Debi Enker from The Age stated "Worst affected is poor Tasma Walton in the largely thankless role of psychologist Claudia Leigh. Her job appears to involve sitting in the office and making smug pronouncements about human nature, with particular attention to perverts." Enker's colleague Farah Farouque called Claudia "po-faced". During the Daniel Worthington storyline, Ciara Cuthbert from TV Week quipped that "It's mind games galore this week", before branding the character a "pretty profiler" and saying that Claudia "may regret her hard-ball approach."
