= Talia Zucker =

Australian actress

- Born: Australia
- Occupation: Actress
- Years active: 2002–present

Talia Zucker is an Australian actress. She is best known for her role as Alice Palmer in the cult horror film Lake Mungo (2008).

== Biography ==
She played the role of Claire Jardine in the ABC series Dirt Game with Joel Edgerton and Gerald Lepkowski in 2009. Talia appeared as a guest character in the Australian drama series City Homicide and played a lead role in the children's series Scooter: Secret Agent and Legacy of the Silver Shadow.

She played the recurring role of Erin Perry in the Australian soap opera Neighbours in 2003 and appeared in the popular Australian series Blue Heelers. Talia played the role of Louisa Von Trapp in the Australia tour of The Sound of Music starring Lisa McCune and John Waters. She appears as Sarah Wicks in the film Ned Kelly starring Heath Ledger.

In 2008, Talia appears as the central character of Alice Palmer in the film Lake Mungo directed by Joel Anderson.

In 2018 she directed her first short film.

== Filmography ==
Year	Film	Role	Notes
2003	Ned Kelly	Sarah Wicks	film debut
2008	Lake Mungo	Alice Palmer	
2018	Afterwards	Director	short film
2019	Child	Director	short film
2020	Motel Acacia	Cathy	
2024	In Vitro	Layla	Also writer

=== Series ===
Year	Series	Role
2001	Legacy of the Silver Shadow	Dina
2003	Neighbours	Erin Perry
2003	Scooter: Secret Agent	Melanie
2003	Blue Heelers	Melissa Watson
2007	City Homicide	Jacqui Quinn
2009	Dirt Game	Claire Jardine
2011	Killing Time	Candy
2012	Miss Fisher's Murder Mysteries	Nina Aliyena
