= Tasma Walton =

Australian actress and writer (born 1973)

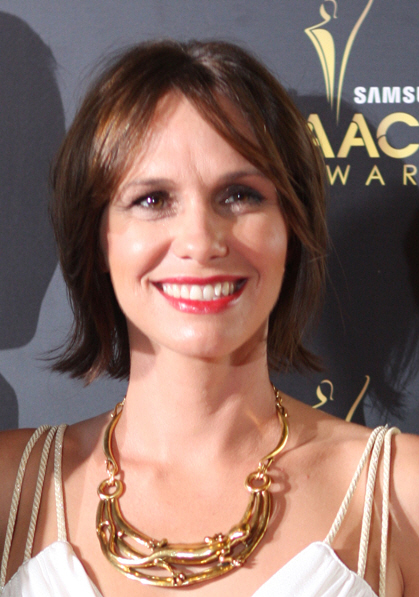
- Walton at the 2012 Samsung AACTA Awards
- Born: 19 August 1973 (age 53); Geraldton, Western Australia, Australia
- Occupations: Actress, writer
- Years active: 1989–present
- Spouse: Rove McManus (m. 2009)
- Children: 1

Tasma Walton (born 19 August 1973) is an Aboriginal Australian stage, television, and film actress and writer. She became known for her role as Rachel Watson in Home and Away from 1995, and has since appeared in many films and television series, including Blue Heelers (as Constable Dash McKinley), The Secret Life of Us, Cleverman, Mystery Road, The Twelve, and, most recently, Reckless, which she created and wrote. She has also written two novels, and as of September 2026 is working on an original screenplay for a new TV series. Her 2025 historical novel I am Nannertgarrook is the co-winner of the 2026 ARA Historical Novel Prize.

== Early life and education ==
Tasma Walton was born on 19 August 1973 in Geraldton, a small city in Western Australia on the coast 400 km (250 mi) north of Perth. She grew up living in public housing with a single mother, the second youngest of four sisters. Her mother read to the girls every night.

Two experiences while in high school sparked her interest in acting: an inspiring drama teacher, who cast Walton in Euripides' Medea for a school production, and a school trip to a performance of Ibsen's John Gabriel Borkman at the The Hole in the Wall Theatre in Subiaco, Perth.

Walton first joined home-town radio station 6GE and trained as a production assistant and copywriter.

She moved across the country to Sydney around 1988, aged 15, to forge her own path. She trained at the National Institute of Dramatic Art (NIDA) for two years (1992–3), but dropped out before graduating.

In her late 30s she discovered she is of Boonwurrung (Bunurong) descent on her mother's side. The Boonwurrung people are an Aboriginal saltwater people of the Melbourne area.

== Career ==
=== Acting ===
She has subsequently continued to perform on stage, in between her film and television commitments.

==== Screen ====
In 1989, Walton landed a role as the love interest of Ian Moss in the music video for Tucker's Daughter off his 1989 debut album Matchbook. It would be six more years before her next on screen role.

==== Stage ====
Between her on screen roles, Walton acted on stage. During her time studying at NIDA, Walton acted in several productions at the NIDA Parade Theatre 1 in 1992 and 1993.

==== Screen ====
In 1995, Walton returned to the screen again, playing the recurring role of Rachel Watson in Home and Away.

In 1996, Walton was cast as Dash McKinley in the police drama series Blue Heelers. Her character was introduced halfway through Season 3. She also played another character, Kim Trelor, in the same series. In the same year, she made her film debut in Fistful of Flies. Her last episode of Blue Heelers ("The Full Circle") screened in 1999.

In 2009, Walton joined the cast of City Homicide in the semi-regular role of criminal profiler, Claudia Leigh. In July 2013, it was announced that Walton had rejoined the cast of Home and Away in the recurring role of Jade Montgomery. She was on the show for two seasons.

In 2016, Walton appeared in three episodes of Rake. After discovering her Aboriginal ancestry she also had a regular role on Cleverman (2016–2017). In 2018, she joined the cast of another Indigenous themed show, Mystery Road, reprising her role from the 2013 film of the same name. She returned for the second season in 2020.

In 2023 Walton appeared in the Seven Network series The Claremont Murders, and she joined the second season of Foxtel series The Twelve in July 2024.

She played a lead role in the 2025 comedy drama series Reckless, which she had also created and written.

Other film and TV appearances include Water Rats, Sea Patrol, The Postcard Bandit, and the 2005 short Perdition.

=== Writing ===
Walton has also written novels and has worked in many writers' rooms and workshops during the development of film, television and theatre productions.

Her novel Heartless was published in 2009, and was nominated for an ABIA Award for General Fiction.

Walton has also written a series of children's books entitled Nerra: Deep Time Traveller, the first book of which (The Broken Rainbow) was longlisted for the DANZ Children's Book Award.

I am Nannertgarrook, published in 2025, is a semi-fictional historical novel based on the experiences of her great-great-great grandmother, a Bunurong woman named Nannertgarrook, who was abducted by sealers and sold into slavery in the 1830s. When Walton was a child, she was told through her family that Nannertgarrook had fallen in love with a merchant seaman and eloped with him, and Walton wanted to expose some of the true history of the period. On being longlisted for the Stella Prize, the judges wrote: "A page-turner that is also deeply researched; beautifully written and very accessible; an embodiment of Walton's First Nations heritage and culture that welcomes all readers into its rich emotional landscape". The book was shortlisted for the Nib Literary Award and the People's Choice Prize, as well as being the joint winner (with Robbie Arnott for his 2024 novel Dusk) of the ARA Historical Novel Prize.

Walton created, wrote, and took a lead role in the 2025 TV series Reckless. On 24 February 2026 the ABC commissioned a new six-part crime drama series created by her, titled Pilli Sisters PI. As of September 2026 Walton is working on the new series, her first work set entirely in Western Australia. At the centre are Marlee and May, two middle-aged Aboriginal who work as private investigators. As yet the cast is unknown.

== Recognition and awards ==
=== Acting ===
- 1996: Winner, Sochi Film Festival Award for Best Actress, for Fistful of Flies
- 1997: Winner, Logie Award for Most Popular New Talent, at the 39th Annual TV Week Logie Awards, for her role as "Constable Dash McKinley" on Blue Heelers
- 2014: Nominated, Best Actress at the 3rd AACTA Awards, for her role in Mystery Road

=== Writing ===
==== Heartless ====
- Nominated, ABIA Award for General Fiction

==== I am Nannertgarrook ====
- Co-winner (with Robbie Arnott), ARA Historical Novel Prize
- Shortlisted, Western Australian Premier's Book Awards – Fiction Book of the Year
- Longlisted, Stella Prize
- Shortlisted, Nib Literary Award

== Personal life ==
Walton was in a relationship with fellow actor Danny Roberts for seven and a half years until 2004. She began dating Rove McManus in October 2007. They married in a private ceremony in Broome, Western Australia, on 16 June 2009. In December 2013, Walton and McManus announced the birth of their daughter, Ruby. They remain together as of 2025.

== Filmography ==
=== Film ===
Year	Title	Role	Notes
1996	Fistful of Flies	Maria "Mars" Lupi	Feature film
1998	Cody: The Wrong Stuff		TV film
1999	Airtight	Virg	TV film
2000	Virtual Nightmare	Wendy	TV film
2003	Subterano	Stone	Feature film
2003	The Postcard Bandit	Frankie	TV film
2004	Roll	Emma	TV film
2005	Perdition	Jo	Short film
2005	Little Oberon	Georgie Green	TV film
2006	Safety in Numbers	Caroline	
2006	BlackJack: At the Gates	Sylvia	TV film
2009	Dreamland	April Freeman	
2009	Blessed	Gail	Feature film
2009	Together Alone	Trish	Short film
2013	Mystery Road	Mary Swan	Feature film
2015	Looking for Grace	Sandra	Feature film
2017	The Half Dead	Julie Masden	Post-production
2021	How to Please a Woman	Monique	Feature film
2022	Sweet As	Mitch	Feature film

=== Television ===
Year	Title	Role	Notes	Ref
1995	Home and Away	Rachel Watson	TV series, season 8 (recurring role)	
1995	Echo Point	Gina	TV series	
1995	Blue Heelers	Kim Treloar	TV series, episode: "Salutary Lessons"	
1996–99	Blue Heelers	Const. Deirdre E. "Dash" McKinley	TV series, 129 episodes	
2000	Water Rats	Belinda Harvey	TV series, episode: "Able to Leap Tall Buildings"	
2000–02	BeastMaster	Caro	TV series (recurring role)	
2001	The Secret Life of Us	Leah	TV series (recurring role)	
2003	White Collar Blue	Gemma Mancuzzo	TV series, episodes: 2.10, 2.11	
2004	McLeod's Daughters	Tracey Morrison	TV series, season 4, episode 8: "Show of Love"	
2006	Stupid, Stupid Man	Janine Russell	TV series, episode: "A Very, Very Private Function"	
2009	Sea Patrol	Jila	TV series, season 3, episode: "Secret Cargo"	
2009–10	City Homicide	Claudia Leigh	TV series (regular role)	
2013–14	Home and Away	Jade Montgomery	TV series, seasons 26-27 (recurring role)	
2014	It's a Date	Paulina	TV series, episode: "Should You Date Outside Your Comfort Zone?"	
2016	Rake	Jack	TV series, episodes: 4.6, 4.7, 4.8	
2016–17	Cleverman	Araluen	TV series (regular role)	
2018–2020	Mystery Road	Mary Swan	TV series, episodes: 2, 3 & 4	
2023	The Claremont Murders	Karin Margolius	TV series, 2 episodes	
2024	The Twelve	Thelma Connell	TV series: 8 episodes	
2025	Scrublands: Silver	Josie Jones	TV series: 2 episodes	
2025	Deadloch	Detective Greene	TV series	
2025	Reckless	June	TV series	
TBA	Pilli Sisters PI	Creator	TV series	

=== Music videos ===
Year	Title	Artist
1989	Tucker's Daughter	Ian Moss

=== Other appearances ===
Year	Title	Type	Notes	Ref
2019	Show Me the Movie!	Panel show	1 episode	
2020	Whovians	Panel show	1 episode	
2023	Great Australian Walks	Documentary/one-on-one chat show	Point Nepean walk	

== Theatre ==
Walton has also performed extensively on stage, including the following productions:

Year	Title	Role	Notes
1992	Summer of the Aliens	Mrs Irvin / Japanese Woman	UNSW NIDA Parade Theatre
1993	The Skin of Our Teeth		NIDA Parade Theatre
1993	The Grace of Mary Traverse	Mary Traverse / Hangman	NIDA Parade Theatre
1993	All's Well That Ends Well		NIDA Parade Theatre
1993	A House is Built	Katie	NIDA Parade Theatre
1994	Jigsaws		New Theatre, Sydney
2001	The Vagina Monologues		Ensemble Theatre, Sydney
2001	Men of Honour		Ensemble Theatre
2004	Live Acts on Stage		Playhouse Theatre, Perth
2015	Dinner		Heath Ledger Theatre, Perth
2019	Winyanboga Yurringa		Belvoir Street Theatre, Sydney
