= Fistful of Flies =

- Directed by: Monica Pellizzari
- Starring: Tasma Walton
- Release date: 1997
- Country: Australia
- Language: English
- Box office: A$9,490 (Australia)

Fistful of Flies is a 1997 Australian film directed by Monica Pellizzari and starring Tasma Walton.

It screened at the Sundance Film Festival.

== Cast ==
- Tasma Walton as Maria 'Mars' Lupi
- Anna Volska as Nanna
- Rachael Maza as Dr Powers
