= The Understudy (1976 film) =

- Written by: Eric Luithle
- Directed by: Eric Luithle
- Starring: John McTernan; Jeanie Drynan; Don Barkham; Ivar Kants
- Country of origin: Australia
- Original language: English

Production
- Producer: Eric Luithle
- Editor: William M. Anderson
- Running time: 75 minutes
- Production company: Sandbar Productions
- Budget: $28,000

Original release
- Release: 1976

The Understudy is a 1976 Australian television film directed by Eric Luithle and starring John McTernan, Jeanie Drynan, Don Barkham, and Ivar Kants. It is about a film within a film.

== Cast ==
- John McTernan
- Jeanie Drynan
- Don Barkham
- Ivar Kants
- Robin Bowering
- Graham Pitts
