= Scooter: Secret Agent =

Australian TV series

- Genre: Sci-Fi; Children's
- Created by: Jonathan M. Shiff
- Directed by: Richard Jasek; Colin Budds
- Starring: Martin Sharpe; Talia Zucker; Charlene Tjoe
- Country of origin: Australia
- Original language: English
- No. of seasons: 1
- No. of episodes: 26

Production
- Executive producers: Jonathan M. Shiff; Kay Ben M'Rad
- Producers: Daniel Scharf; Jonathan M. Shiff
- Running time: 24 minutes
- Production companies: Jonathan M. Shiff Productions; ZDF; ZDF Enterprises; Network Ten Australia

Original release
- Network: Network Ten
- Release: 28 January – 22 July 2005

Scooter: Secret Agent is an Australian children's television program screened on Network Ten in 2005.

== Plot summary ==
Scooter is an extremely clumsy teenager who finds a computer belonging to the world's greatest Secret Agent. Scooter decides to complete the missions meant for Agent X-19 in a world of master criminals and high-tech gadgets while continuing to work as a pizza delivery boy.

== Cast ==
=== Main / regular ===
- Martin Sharpe as Scooter Carpenter
- Talia Zucker as Melanie
- Charlene Tjoe as Katrina
- John McTernan as Mackenna
- Rodney Afif as Ratborough
- Kenneth Ransom as Fridge
- Tony Nikolakopoulos as Attilio
- Kate Fitzpatrick as Taipan
- Jamie Mezzasalma as Mario
- Brianna Tab as Herself
- Luke O'Loughlin as Lewis

=== Guests ===
- Alethea McGrath as Emily Griffin
- Ben Nicholas as Vern
- Bud Tingwell as Lawrence Clements
- Damien Fotiou as Harrison
- Elena Mandalis as Constable Barnes
- Gerard Kennedy as Baxter
- John Orcsik as Masters
- Kym Gyngell as Cole Bunker
- Laura Gordon as Young Woman
- Nicholas Bell as Stepford
- Nick Carrafa as Garner, Agent X-81
- Orpheus Pledger as Beast Boy
- Ryan Corr as Freddie

== Episodes ==
No.	Title	Directed by	Written by	Original release date
1	"Operation: Destiny"	Richard Jasek	Philip Dalkin	28 January 2005
2	"Operation: Trainspotting"	Richard Jasek	John Armstrong	4 February 2005
3	"Operation: Chocolate Soldier"	Richard Jasek	Chris Anastassiades	11 February 2005
4	"Operation: Whistler"	Richard Jasek	Max Dann	18 February 2005
5	"Operation: Mask-In-A-Can"	Richard Jasek	Philip Dalkin	25 February 2005
6	"Operation: Micro-droid"	Richard Jasek	Ray Boseley	4 March 2005
7	"Operation: Little Dragon"	Richard Jasek	Sam Carroll	11 March 2005
8	"Operation: Mummy's Curse"	Grant Brown	Annette Moore	18 March 2005
9	"Operation: Songbird"	Grant Brown	Sam Carroll	25 March 2005
10	"Operation: Supernatural"	Grant Brown	Philip Dalkin	1 April 2005
11	"Operation: Con-Artist"	Grant Brown	Simon Butters	8 April 2005
12	"Operation: Alien"	Grant Brown	Kris Mrksa	15 April 2005
13	"Operation: Beast Boy"	Grant Brown	Mark Shirrefs & John Thomson	22 April 2005
14	"Operation: Down the Drain"	Colin Budds	Kevin Nemeth	29 April 2005
15	"Operation: Double Oh"	Colin Budds	Max Dann	6 May 2005
16	"Operation: Dollface"	Colin Budds	Ray Boseley	13 May 2005
17	"Operation: Wombat"	Colin Budds	Simon Butters, Sam Carroll, Philip Dalkin, Annie Fox	20 May 2005
18	"Operation: Aphrodite"	Colin Budds	John Armstrong	27 May 2005
19	"Operation: Crystal Clear"	Colin Budds	Chris Anastassiades	3 June 2005
20	"Operation: Under Par"	Colin Budds	Kevin Nemeth	10 June 2005
21	"Operation: Stealth"	Colin Budds	Simon Butters	17 June 2005
22	"Operation: Senior Citizen"	Colin Budds	Max Dann	24 June 2005
23	"Operation: Kidnap"	Colin Budds	Sam Carroll	1 July 2005
24	"Operation: Replication"	Colin Budds	Ray Boseley	8 July 2005
25	"Operation: Deception"	Colin Budds	Philip Dalkin	15 July 2005
26	"Operation: Endgame"	Colin Budds	Unknown	22 July 2005

== See also ==
- List of Australian television series
