= Christopher Weekes =

Australian film director and producer

- Born: 22 March 1980 (age 46); Sydney, New South Wales, Australia
- Occupations: Director, Writer, Actor,
- Years active: 2004–present

Christopher Weekes (born 22 March 1980) is an Australian film director, film producer, actor, and screenwriter. He is best known for writing, directing and acting in the 2008 film Bitter & Twisted and for topping the 2009 Hollywood Blacklist with his spec screenplay "The Muppet Man".

== Career ==
In 2008, Weekes wrote, directed, and acted in the feature Bitter & Twisted, which had its international premiere at the Tribeca Film Festival. It won the Australian Film Critics Circle Award for Best Actress as well as being nominated for two Australian Film Institute Awards, an Independent Film Award and three MIFF awards.

In 2009, it was announced that Weekes would be rewriting the screenplay Waterproof for Legendary Pictures and director Kevin Lima.

Also in 2009, his spec screenplay "The Muppet Man", about the life and death of Jim Henson, topped the Hollywood Blacklist. It is currently in development with Walt Disney Pictures and The Jim Henson Company.

In 2011, it was announced that Weekes would be writing "Ponzi's Scheme", based on the book of the same name by Mitchell Zuckoff, for director Miloš Forman.

== Filmography ==
=== Actor ===
- 1988 A Country Practice
- 2002 All Saints
- 2008 Bitter & Twisted
- 2012 Puberty Blues

=== Director ===
- 2008 Bitter & Twisted

=== Writer ===
- 2008 Bitter & Twisted
- 2009 "The Muppet Man"
- 2011 "Ponzi's Scheme"
