= Lake Mungo (film) =

2008 Australian horror film

- Theatrical release poster
- Directed by: Joel Anderson
- Written by: Joel Anderson
- Produced by: Georgie Nevile; David Rapsey
- Starring: Talia Zucker; David Pledger; Rosie Traynor; Martin Sharpe; Steve Jodrell
- Cinematography: John Brawley
- Edited by: Bill Murphy
- Music by: Dai Paterson; Fernando Corona
- Production companies: SBS Independent; Screen Australia; Mungo Productions
- Distributed by: Arclight Films
- Release date: 18 June 2008 (Sydney)
- Running time: 88 minutes
- Country: Australia
- Language: English
- Budget: $1.7 million
- Box office: $29,850

Lake Mungo is a 2008 Australian psychological horror film written and directed by Joel Anderson. Presented in the pseudo-documentary format with elements of found footage and docufiction, it is Anderson's only film. It follows a family trying to come to terms with the loss of their daughter Alice (Talia Zucker) after she drowns and the potentially supernatural events they experience after it.

Lake Mungo premiered at the Sydney Film Festival on 18 June 2008, and was screened at the American South by Southwest film festival in March 2009. It received positive reviews from critics and has gained a cult following since its release, being included by IndieWire in "Top 15 Best Found Footage Movies", and ranked by Variety as the most terrifying found footage film.

== Plot ==
While swimming with her family at a dam in Ararat, Australia, 16-year-old Alice Palmer disappears. Days later, her body is found in a stormwater drainage basin. Her parents, Russell and June, are called to identify the body; Russell confirms it to be Alice, but June refuses to view it. Ten days after her funeral, Alice's brother Mathew develops unexplained bruises, and the family begins hearing strange noises. Russell recalls an aggressive encounter with an apparition, while June experiences recurring nightmares of Alice's drenched corpse. Mathew takes up photography and appears to capture Alice's figure in the backyard and in a photograph taken at the lake.

Hoping Alice may still be alive, the Palmers request an exhumation and DNA test, which confirms that the body is hers. Meanwhile, Mathew installs cameras around the house to record apparent sightings of Alice. June consults self-proclaimed psychic Ray Kemeney, who conducts a séance but cannot explain the phenomena. Months later, Mathew confesses that he fabricated the ghostly photographs and videos to persuade his parents to exhume Alice's body, allowing June another opportunity to view it and find closure.

A home video recorded while the family is away appears to show Alice's apparition and their neighbour Brett Toohey, whom Alice had babysat for, searching her bedroom. June subsequently discovers a hidden videotape showing Alice in a threesome with Brett and his wife, Marissa. Russell concludes that Brett was searching for the tape after learning of Alice's death. The Tooheys soon sell their house and disappear. The Palmers are informed that legal action would probably result only in a suspended sentence, as the encounter would be considered consensual.

Ray later reveals that Alice had visited him months before her death, describing recurring nightmares of death, drowning, and the fear that her mother would be unable to see or help her; feelings she had also recorded in her journal. Alice's boyfriend, Jason Whittle, provides mobile phone footage from a school trip to Lake Mungo, showing Alice burying something beneath a tree. The Palmers subsequently visit the site and recover her phone. Its footage shows Alice walking along the shoreline at night before encountering a bloated, disfigured version of herself (identical to the body recovered at the dam) floating slowly towards her before attacking her.

The Palmers come to believe that Alice wanted them to understand her experiences, although they disagree over whether the encounter at Lake Mungo motivated her death. Believing the haunting has ended, they move out of their home. As June takes one final look into Alice's bedroom, audio from Alice's interview with Ray plays, recalling her fear that her mother could not see her. Alice remarks, "she's gone," as June leaves. A photograph taken during the family's departure reveals Alice's faint figure in a window, while footage shown during the end credits, including Mathew's fabricated images, depicts her elsewhere in the background.

A post-credits scene shows Alice's ghost lingering at Lake Mungo during a thunderstorm.

== Cast ==
- Talia Zucker as Alice Palmer
- David Pledger as Russell Palmer, Alice's father
- Rosie Traynor as June Palmer, Alice's mother
- Martin Sharpe as Mathew "Mattie" Palmer, Alice's brother
- Steve Jodrell as Ray Kemeney
- Tania Lentini as Georgie Ritter
- Cameron Strachan as Leith Ritter
- Judith Roberts as Iris Long, Alice's grandmother
- Robin Cuming as Garrett Long, Alice's grandfather
- Marcus Costello as Jason Whittle, Alice's boyfriend
- Chloe Armstrong as Kim Whittle, Jason's sister and Alice's bestfriend
- Carole Patullo as Sandy Drouin
- Tamara Donnellan as Marissa Toohey
- Scott Terrill as Brett Toohey
- Joel Anderson as Interviewer (uncredited)

== Production ==
Joel Anderson wrote the bulk of the screenplay in 2005, at a time when he was finding it difficult to acquire funding for a different screenplay, which required a much larger budget. After discussions with people who would become collaborators on Lake Mungo, he decided to write a fictional documentary-style story that he could film on a low budget. When asked about his main inspiration for creating the script, he dismissed the idea of it being a supernatural film and expressed his opinion that it is "meant to be an exploration of grief". He also cited a curiosity as to how "technology is used to record people's lives and sort of tracks memories, and how technology mediates a lot of our experiences". Initial financing was attained through private investors, after which Anderson and the production team approached the Australian government's film funding body Screen Australia for the rest of the budget.

During casting, low-profile actors were sought in an effort to maintain an authentic documentary feel. The film was shot over a period of approximately five weeks using both film and video formats. The script featured only the outline of the story and no written dialogue, so the actors were tasked with improvising their scenes; Anderson also served as the offscreen interviewer in the film's interview scenes, though he chose to remain uncredited.

== Release ==
Lake Mungo premiered at the Sydney Film Festival on 18 June 2008. In March 2009, it screened at the South by Southwest film festival in Austin, Texas. On 13 March, the film was shown at the Travelling Film Festival in Wagga Wagga. On 17 March, the film screened in England at the London Australian Film Festival. On 21 January 2010, the film was shown at the American After Dark Horrorfest, distributed by Lionsgate and After Dark Films.

== Reception ==
On review aggregator Rotten Tomatoes, 96% of 24 critics gave Lake Mungo a positive review; the website's critical consensus reads: "Haunting and meticulously crafted, Lake Mungo transcends typical found-footage horror with its convincing performances, rich emotional resonance, and subtly eerie imagery." The film was nominated for Best Horror Movie at the Fright Meter Awards in 2010.

It was included by IndieWire in "Top 15 Best Found Footage Movies", by Vulture in "Top 25 Best Found Footage Horror Movies", by Screen Rant in "Top 20 Best Found Footage Horror Movies", by Collider in "Top 15 Best International Found Footage Movies", by YardBarker in "Top 20 Best Found Footage Horror Films", by /Film in "Top 25 Scariest Found Footage Horror Movies", and by Paste in "Top 35 Best Found Footage Horror Movies".

Russell Edwards of Variety called it an "ambitious, restrained, and well-mounted mockumentary" and praised its musical score, but critiqued its dim lighting and lack of scripted dialogue. Andrew L. Urban of Urban Cinefile wrote that "this superbly constructed and executed film gets everything right, to the smallest detail, as it draws us into the imagined scenario". Simon Miraudo of Quickflix called it "a mournful, dreamlike examination of the hole left in the heart of a family after a death" and awarded it 5/5 stars. Simon Foster of the Special Broadcasting Service declared it to be "one of the most impressive debut films from this country in many years" and further commented that "the young director has created a nerve-rattler unlike any film the Australian industry has produced".

Megan Lehmann of The Hollywood Reporter noted the film's "compelling slow build", "surreal atmospherics", and "restrained soundtrack that works on a primal level [and] cleaves close to reality". She also praised its fusion of supernatural elements with substantive themes on family and loss, concluding that "this ambitious exploration of death and its aftershocks will reward more discerning genre fans". Conversely, a review published by Bloody Disgusting concluded that "the ultimate problem with Lake Mungo is that the filmmakers had too many good ideas crammed into one film and not enough time to tell all their tales".

In 2020, Mike Sprague of Dread Central included the film on his list of 10 underrated horror films to watch on Amazon Prime during COVID-19 lockdowns. Later that year, Meagan Navarro of Bloody Disgusting went against the publication's initial negative review to write that "the scares come subtle, often lurking in the background for only the most observant to notice [...] [it's a] unique horror movie, a slow-burn mystery full of twists and one seriously unnerving jump scare for the ages". Filmmaker Mike Flanagan, in his review on Letterboxd, praised the film for being "exceptional, terrifying, and ultimately heartbreaking. The movie will stick with you, and the more you think about its lonely, tragic implications, the more it will haunt you."

Following the release of Lake Mungo, Anderson has kept an extremely low profile; he has not written or directed another film, given no interviews since 2009, and has no known social media pages. His elusiveness has contributed to Lake Mungo's mystique as a cult film, which he suggested may have been part of his intention: "I think we were thinking it'd be nice if we could make a film that was kind of a curiosity, but if you saw it years from now you wouldn't know anything about where it came from. You'd be wondering—is it real, is it not real?" He eventually returned to the film industry in 2023 as an executive producer and script editor on the supernatural horror film Late Night with the Devil.

=== Lists ===
- Rotten Tomatoes: "Top 100 Best Found Footage Movies"
- IndieWire: "The 15 Best Found Footage Movies"
- Variety: "10 Terrifying Found Footage Films (and 5 That Should’ve Stayed Lost)"
- Entertainment Weekly: "The 25 best found footage movies of all time, ranked"
- BFI: "10 great found-footage films"
- Vulture: "The 25 Best Found-Footage Horror Movies"
- Screen Rant: "20 Best Found Footage Horror Movies"
- Collider: "The 15 Best International Found Footage Movies"
- /Film: "The 25 Scariest Found Footage Horror Movies"
- Paste: "The 35 Best Found Footage Horror Movies"
- Fangoria: "15 Of The Scariest Found Footage Films After The Blair Witch Project"
- YardBarker: "The 20 Best Found Footage Horror Films"
- We Got This Covered: "10 Horror Films Perfect for Analog Horror Fans"
- Cosmopolitan: "23 Found Footage Horror Movies to Give You Genuine, Real Life (Or Is It?) Scares"
- Creepy Catalog: "50+ Found Footage Horror Movies: The Definitive List"

== See also ==
- List of cult films
- List of ghost films
- Cinema of Australia
