= Bitter & Twisted (film) =

- Directed by: Christopher Weekes
- Written by: Christopher Weekes
- Produced by: Bridget Callow
- Starring: Noni Hazlehurst; Steve Rodgers; Leeanna Walsman; Christopher Weekes; Matthew Newton; Gary Sweet; Rhys Muldoon; Penne Hackforth-Jones; Basia A'Hern
- Cinematography: Sam Collins
- Edited by: Simon B. Wright
- Music by: Brian Cachia
- Distributed by: Odins Eye Entertainment
- Release date: 24 April 2008
- Running time: 90 minutes
- Country: Australia
- Language: English
- Budget: $160,000
- Box office: A$12,500

Bitter & Twisted is a 2008 drama film written, directed by and starring Christopher Weekes. It premiered at the Tribeca Film Festival in 2008 and has since screened at over eleven international and Australian festivals and been critically well received.

== Plot ==
Three years after the death of a young man, Liam Lombard, the story flashes forward to assess the toll it has taken on his parents, brother, and ex-girlfriend, all set against the backdrop of suburban Sydney.

Jordan Lombard is a broken man, now hideously obese and unable to function. His once happy marriage is skidding hopelessly out of control. His wife Penelope is trapped in routine, devoid of self-respect. Her pain only deepens with the onset of menopause. This humiliation has driven her straight into the arms of another, younger, man.

Their surviving son Ben has developed a peculiar relationship with the local boy Matt. Though an unlikely pair, a romance has begun to blossom. As Ben's sexuality comes further into question, he turns his attentions to the girl next-door Indigo, his dead brother's former lover. Never quite the same since his death, her destructive relationship with a married man, Greg, is fading as is her relationship with her mother Jackie. As Ben sets out to woo her in his own twisted fashion, including dressing like an old neighbour, Indigo comes to find he might be her one true friend.

Then history repeats. Jordan suffers a heart attack, shaking his family to their core. In the middle of a night, three years on from the death of her son, Penelope fights for her husband at a hospital bedside. Desperate to reclaim his life, Jordan races to quit his oppressive job in spectacular and uncharacteristic fashion on his boss's doorstep. When Jordan finally gets home that night – he crumbles in his wife's arms - a second chance now awarded.

Meanwhile, Ben makes his way to a lonely bus, planning to skip the city with Indigo. While there, he impulsively reaches over and kisses her, hoping all his questions might finally be answered. But there's nothing.

Liam is no longer the motivation for their lives. As Ben races off to Matt, Penelope kisses her husband goodnight and Indigo begins her adventure from the back seat of a bus, they all finally see a future filled with hope.

== Cast ==
The film features many distinguished and critically acclaimed Australian actors. The full cast list is as below:

Actor	Role
Noni Hazlehurst	Penelope Lombard
Steve Rodgers	Jordan Lombard
Leeanna Walsman	Indigo Samvini
Christopher Weekes	Ben Lombard
Matthew Newton	Matt
Gary Sweet	Greg Praline
Rhys Muldoon	Donald Carn
Basia A'Hern	Lisa Lombard
Penne Hackforth-Jones	Jackie Samvini
Sam Haft	Lucas
Andrea Moor	Pauline Praline
Jeremy Brennan	Liam Lombard

== Themes ==
Bitter & Twisted has been noted as having a dream like quality, part-suburban soap opera and part-fairytale.

== Production ==
Writer and director Christopher Weekes completed the first draft of Bitter & Twisted at the age of 20. Having grown up in and around the suburban fringe of Sydney, he drew his inspiration from the characters that dwell there.

Self-financed on a shoe-string budget, the film was shot in 24 days with a small skeleton crew in and around Sutherland in Sydney, 2005.

The film has been favourably compared to the early works of Jane Campion and Mike Leigh.

== Reception ==
Bitter & Twisted was critically well received, with reviewers particularly noting the strong performances of the distinguished cast, and in particular the portrayal of Penelope by Noni Hazlehurst. The screenplay and direction by Christopher Weekes was also commended for its subtle, dream-like qualities and inventive narrative with David Stratton at The Australian claiming that it "should be counted among the most positive achievements of Australian cinema".

== Release ==
Bitter & Twisted was released theatrically in Australian cinemas on 18 September 2008, and on Australian DVD and home video in January 2010.

=== Awards & Festivals ===
Bitter & Twisted has featured and been in competition at the following festivals:

- 2008 Tribeca Film Festival
- 2008 Dungog Film Festival
- 2008 Montreal World Film Festival
- 2008 Sarajevo Film Festival
- 2008 Torino Film Festival
- 2008 Goteborg Film Festival
- 2009 Cleveland Film Festival
- 2009 Cinequest Film Festival
- 2009 Dublin International Film Festival
- 2009 15th London Australian Film Festival
- 2009 Glasgow Film Festival

It was nominated for Best Actress (Noni Hazlehurst) and Best Supporting Actress (Leeanna Walsman) at the 2008 AFI Awards Awards and for three MIFF Awards including Best Screenplay and Best Film. Christopher Weekes was also nominated for a 2008 IF Award and a 2008 Qantas Spirit of Youth Award. At the 2008 Australian Film Critics Circle Awards, Noni Hazlehurst was named Best Actress for her portrayal of Penelope Lombard.
