= Bernice Waverley =

- City Homicide character
- First appearance: "In The Hands Of Giants Pt 1"; 28 August 2007
- Last appearance: "Ghosts, Part VI"; 30 March 2011
- Created by: John Hugginson; John Banas
- Portrayed by: Noni Hazlehurst

In-universe information
- Title(s): Detective Superintendent; Detective Commander
- Occupation: Police Detective
- Children: Josh Waverley
- Relatives: Rhys Levitt (nephew)

Bernice Waverley is a fictional character from the Australian drama series City Homicide, played by Noni Hazlehurst. She made her first screen appearance in the pilot episode "In The Hands Of Giants Pt 1", which was broadcast on 28 August 2007.

== Casting ==
Hazlehurst signed up for a part in City Homicide, after learning that series would have a strong ensemble cast. She told Erin McWhirter of The Courier-Mail "I like the idea of the regular cast and the reasons dramas have failed is because they haven't assembled a group of well-known people. They will have one but when you look at six faces and you only know or like one you have to really like that one person to watch." Hazlehurst was also intrigued by the chance to play a strong female character, who was in an executive position within the police force and had the respect of her colleagues. The actress met with members from the real Victoria Police homicide squad, so she could understand her character better. Hazlehurst initially commuted from Queensland to Melbourne for filming, before moving to the latter city when she found the travelling too much.

== Development ==
"The Detective Superintendent of Homicide, Bernice Waverley is a supportive sounding board to Stanley Wolfe and his team of Detective Senior Constables. She's a great advocate for the advancement of women in the Police Service but also a firm believer in the notion that they have to earn their place, just as she did."

— A Yahoo!7 writer on Bernice

Hazlehurst told Clare Rigden of TV Week that at the start of Season 1, Bernice had been in the force for around 35 years, a fact which is highlighted in a scene with Jennifer Mapplethorpe (Nadine Garner), where Bernice mentions that when she joined the force, "there weren't even women's toilets!" Hazlehurst thought it was "interesting on the part of the writers" to have a woman in charge. She felt that women brought "a different sensitivity and sensibility to the job" which was starting to be better acknowledged. She also went on to say: "I understand the difficulties of being a female in a male world. I think most females do. But in a profession like the police, for a woman to get this rank she would have to have these qualities in spades. It was important she be someone who was able to command respect, who has authority, doesn't take bulls--- and trusts her instincts to have good people on her team and let them do their jobs." Hazlehurst described Bernice as "tenacious, intuitive and tough".

When asked about the sacrifices Bernice had made for her career, Hazlehurst revealed that Bernice has a child, and said that for a woman of Bernice's rank, she is on call 24 hours a day, seven days of the week. Hazlehurst pointed out that anyone with Bernice's seniority within the force has that kind of workload and it has not been easy for her to juggle work and raising a child, adding "a high-stress job like this makes the mothering part of your life incredibly difficult." She also told Rigden that this aspect of her character's life is not explored straight away in the series, but it would be looked at in the future. Another TV Week writer called Bernice "tough and fiercely competitive" and commented that her goal was to become Commissioner. They said "She believes that women have as much of a right to be in the top ranks of the service as their male counterparts, but she also thinks they have to earn their place like she did. Behind the tough professional exterior, Bernice is a compassionate single mother to 14-year-old Josh." In February 2009, Hazlehurst reflected on her character's journey, saying "Waverley's life and career have taken some extreme twists and unexpected turns over the last two seasons, and playing her has been a terrific challenge and a huge learning curve." She found that she had even more respect for the work that the police do every day, and she had more understanding of the pressure they were under in their professional and personal lives.

Ahead of Season 2, Hazlehurst revealed that Bernice would endure a number of new challenges, both "professional and personal". She also said Bernice would face "tricky situations", some of which would land her in compromising positions.

A major storyline for the character was the kidnapping and death of her teenage son, Josh (played by Hazlehurst's son William Jarratt). The storyline begins with Bernice being investigated for alleged misconduct. She then learns that she is being set up by Billy Pierce (Simon Stone), the brother of a policeman that Bernice had come into contact with some years prior. Bernice had been the chair of a committee that rejected Billy's brother's application for remuneration. Afterwards, he committed suicide and Billy found him. Billy later kidnaps Bernice's son Josh, and taunts her with clues as to his whereabouts. Hazlehurst thought Billy's revenge plan was "perfectly executed" and said "he's a very disturbed but intelligent man who's established a near foolproof scheme to bring Bernice undone." Hazlehurst called the storyline the hardest thing she has ever done, but she enjoyed playing something that challenged her. She also enjoyed being out and about, as most of Bernice's scenes were shot in her office. When asked if it was easier to summon up the emotions knowing it was her own son, Hazlehurst replied "certainly, yes – since it was my own son, there was another layer of emotion there." The actress added that she hoped viewers would be moved by the storyline and that her respect for what the police do increased "tremendously".

Ahead of the third season airing in August 2009, Hazlehurst said that her character would not be returning to work straightaway, commenting "She is, understandably, taking some time off." Hazlehurst confirmed that Bernice would come back later in the series in the new role of acting sergeant. She explained that Bernice wants to get into some "hands-on work" as opposed to pushing pens, so she has less time to think. She continued: "There are no obvious cracks in her armour, but every now and then you see the hurt." Hazlehurst also gave details of a new story for Bernice, who comes into contact with the man who brought her integrity into question during the Billy Pierce storyline. As she is forced to investigate him, Hazlehurst said that it appears he is on "the wrong side of the law." In an interview published on the show's official website, Hazlehurst admitted that her character's life had "taken some extreme twists and unexpected turns over the last two seasons", which she found to be an enjoyable challenge to film as well as "a huge learning curve." Hazlehurst also said working on City Homicide had increased her respect and admiration for the work carried out by real police officers.

The following year, producer Richard Jasek took over the running of the show. When asked if Bernice would be "back in action" after taking a backseat role in the last season, Jasek stated "We'll see plenty of Bernice this season – she will have a journey regarding unresolved family issues." He also said that the character would face some professional challenges, and that the audience would see more of the upper ranks, including Bernice, Terry Jarvis (David Field) and Stanley Wolfe (Shane Bourne). City Homicide aired a fifth and final season in early 2011. During the season, Bernice, now promoted to Commander, has to tell the homicide team that Attorney General Michael Lombardi (Marcus Graham) has ordered their disbandment. James Joyce of the Canberra Times observed "Commander Bernice commiserated in her own headmistress way, but stopped short of a soothing rendition of The Ning Nang Nong."

== Storylines ==
Bernice Waverley has been a cop since she was 18 years old and in the force for over 30 years at the beginning of the series. She has a teenage son, Josh, and is close friends with Detective Senior Sergeant Stanley Wolfe and Assistant Commissioner Bill Mulholland (John McTernan).

Bernice is accused of corruption and is suspended from the police force, leading her to try and prove she has been set up. Bernice's son Josh is kidnapped by the man framing her Billy Pierce, and it emerges that he is the brother of a former police officer who Bernice had a hand in dismissing from the force. He became deeply depressed and committed suicide. Billy sends Bernice clues as to Josh's whereabouts, but he kills Josh in the same way that his brother died, by slashing his wrists. Bernice is reinstated into the police force, and Stanley consoles her over Josh's murder.

After Stanley goes on leave, Bernice returns to homicide to take over his position, after Bill Mulholland arranges it especially for her. Bernice is promoted to Commander of Crime, leaving Stanley to resume his original position.

== Reception ==
While reviewing the series, Farah Farouque from The Age stated "It's also splendid to see Noni Hazlehurst breaking TV's glass ceiling to play the boss, Superintendent Bernice Waverley, as a woman of a certain age – who has not resorted to surgical enhancement. Now, if only she could score more screen time, too." Josephine Gillespie of The Queensland Times branded Bernice "a hard-talking police officer". While a TV Week writer called the character "a tough operator".

The Sunshine Coast Daily's Nathanael Cooper praised Hazlehurst in the role, saying she "delivered such a compelling performance in the second season that she has managed to establish herself as one of the most popular actresses on television." In his 2010 feature on the top Australian television actresses, the Herald Sun's Colin Vickery said Hazlehurst, along with Catherine McClements, Lisa McCune, Kate Ritchie, and Georgie Parker "show that women can shine in tough action and crime dramas."
