= David Pledger =

Australian artist and director

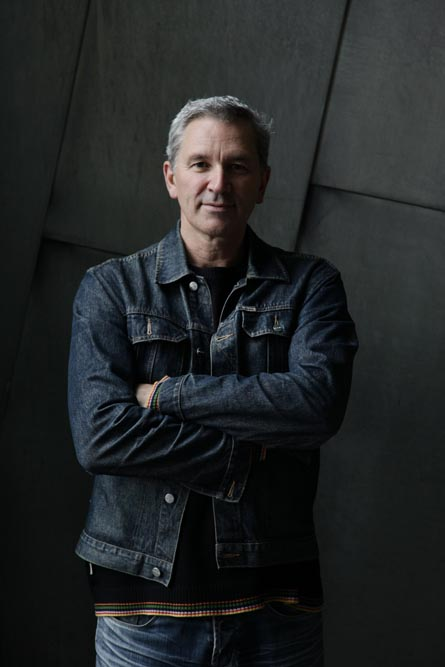
- Pledger in 2010
- Born: c. 1962
- Occupations: Artist, director, arts advocate
- Known for: Interdisciplinary performance; arts policy work
- Notable work: Melbourne Festival (2004); Lake Mungo (2008); Multimedia Performance (2012)

David Pledger (born c. 1962) is an Australian artist, director and occasional actor. Pledger notably appeared in the Australian cult horror film Lake Mungo (2008) as Russell Palmer, the grieving father of protagonist Alice Palmer.

He has won several awards, including the Victorian Arts Centre's 1999 Kenneth Myer Medallion for the Performing Arts, and in 2000 the A$25,000 Sidney Myer Performing Arts Award.

He established the Collaboration Project between the Australia Council for the Arts and the IETM. In 2004 he directed two shows at the Melbourne Festival.

Pledger's work is featured in Melbourne Now Limited Edition (NGV, Australia, 2013); Multimedia Performance (Macmillan, UK, 2012) and Making Contemporary Theatre (MUP, UK, 2010).

In the 1990s, Pledger worked with twin sisters Annie and Maude Davey, both Melbourne-based actresses who later developed their own neo-burlesque and vaudeville show.

He works as an advocate for artists. In 2008, he attended the 2020 Summit as a delegate in the Creative Australia stream.
