= Nancy Wake (miniseries) =

1987 Australian WWII mini-series

- Based on: Nancy Wake: The Story of a Very Brave Woman by Russell Braddon
- Written by: Roger Simpson
- Directed by: Pino Amenta
- Starring: Noni Hazlehurst; John Waters; Shane Briant
- Country of origin: Australia
- Original language: English
- No. of episodes: 2 x 2 hours

Production
- Producers: Roger Le Mesurier; Roger Simpson
- Budget: $3 million

Original release
- Network: Seven Network
- Release: 4 November 1987 – 1987

Nancy Wake is a 1987 Australian mini-series on the exploits of New Zealand born Australian Nancy Wake (Wellington, NZ, 30 August 1912 – London, UK, 7 August 2011) during World War II as a female British Special Operations Executive agent based on Russell Braddon's 1956 book Nancy Wake: The Story of a Very Brave Woman. It was released as True Colors in the United States.

== Production ==
In 1985, Australian television Seven Network purchased the rights to Russell Braddon's book Nancy Wake: The Story of a Very Brave Woman and engaged a producer, but due to differences over what approach to take, including budget, the project was called off. The production company, and director Pino Amenta, had planned to produce a definitive resistance story over eight hours. Five months later, in April 1986, Seven Network approached Simpson Le Mesurier Films, Roger Le Mesurier the producer and Roger Simpson the writer-producer, who came up with a four-hour love story. In October 1986, Nancy Wake was asked to be a consultant, after the script had been prepared. She criticized parts of Simpson's script which were not acceptable to her.

At the launch of the film by Network Seven, Nancy spoke candidly of her views of the production, stating she was disappointed it was not made as originally planned as an eight-hour resistance story but instead a four-hour love story, and criticized aspects of the mini-series. She said "There are certain little things I don't agree with, but in the main I think it's wonderful." She continued to criticize the script throughout her life that certain scenes were not a true depiction.

She appears in the film as Madame Fouret.

Filming was completed within 11 weeks around Melbourne and involved the construction of two French towns. The forest battle scenes were shot near Harcourt in an oak forest and included a two-week shoot in Marseilles and Paris. Nancy was not sent to France to consult.

The mini-series was pre-sold to British Thames Television.

== Cast ==
- Noni Hazlehurst
- John Waters as Henri Fiocca
- Shane Briant as Gestapo Major
- Kevin Miles as Commander Busch
- Nancy Wake as Madame Fouret
- Tiriel Mora as Judex
- John McTernan as Antoine

== Reception ==
The Sydney Morning Herald described it as "... compelling with its humour and tears. The whole cast puts on a brilliant display of talent. This show is not to be missed".

The mini-series screened in July 1988 in Britain taking the title as the highest rating program on London Weekend Television so far that year.

== Home media ==
Nancy Wake was released on DVD and Online Streaming by Umbrella Entertainment in November 2012. The DVD is compatible with all region codes.

| Title | Format | Ep # | Discs | Region 4 (Australia) | Special features | Distributors |
|---|---|---|---|---|---|---|
| Sword Of Honour | DVD | 2 | 2 | 11 November 2012 | None | Umbrella Entertainment |
| Sword Of Honour | Streaming | 2 | - | 11 November 2012 | None | Umbrella Entertainment |
