= City Homicide =

Australian television series

- Opening title card
- Created by: John Hugginson; John Banas
- Starring: Shane Bourne; Nadine Garner; John Adam; Daniel MacPherson; Aaron Pedersen; Damien Richardson; Ryan O'Kane; Nadia Townsend; Noni Hazlehurst
- Country of origin: Australia
- Original language: English
- No. of seasons: 5 (including miniseries)
- No. of episodes: 84 (list of episodes)

Production
- Executive producer: John Holmes
- Producer: MaryAnne Carroll
- Running time: approx. 45 minutes (1 hour with ads)
- Production company: Seven Productions Pty Limited

Original release
- Network: Seven Network
- Release: 27 August 2007 – 30 March 2011

City Homicide cast for seasons 1-2; Damien Richardson as Matt Ryan, Daniel Macpherson as Simon Joyner, Aaron Pedersen as Duncan Freeman, Noni Hazlehurst as Bernice Waverley, Shane Bourne as Stanley Wolfe and Nadine Garner as Jennifer Mapplethorpe

City Homicide is an Australian television drama series that aired on the Seven Network between 27 August 2007 and 30 March 2011. The series was set on the Homicide floor of a metropolitan police headquarters in Melbourne. The main characters were six detectives, who solve the murder cases, and their three superior officers.

City Homicide did not return in its regular format in 2011. A six-episode miniseries titled No Greater Honour was shown instead which marked the closing storyline of the series. The miniseries guest-starred Claire van der Boom, Marcus Graham, John Howard and Graeme Blundell.

== Production ==
The series' co-writers are John Hugginson who has previously worked on Water Rats, Murder Call and Blue Heelers, and John Banas who has written for All Saints and Stingers in addition to Water Rats and Blue Heelers. In an interview with the Herald Sun, Banas said the show had been in planning since "late last millennium".

The bulk of City Homicide was filmed at Seven's South Melbourne studios and the show features Melbourne landmarks, such as Flinders Street station and the city's trams. The first season began production on 16 April 2007.

The series is distributed overseas by Southern Star Group.

The show originally starred Shane Bourne, Nadine Garner, Daniel MacPherson, Aaron Pedersen, Damien Richardson and Noni Hazlehurst. After the second season, the show's executive producers decided to vary the Homicide squad substantially—Nadia Townsend and John Adam were both added to the cast early in the third season, Bourne took a temporary hiatus that lasted most of the third season, guest star David Field made more frequent and substantive appearances, and main characters were written out of many episodes. This custom continued throughout the remainder of the show, with Field (still credited as a guest star) notably appearing more frequently than any other main cast member. Ryan O'Kane entered for seasons 4 and 5 (miniseries) as new member of the team Detective Rhys Levitt.

== Cast ==
=== Main cast ===
None of the main characters appear in all episodes, as periods of leave and rostered days off are incorporated into each character's appearances.

Detective Senior Sergeant Stanley Wolfe (Shane Bourne, 70 episodes, seasons 1–5) is the investigative leader of the Homicide squad. Wolfe is an authoritative yet compassionate boss with years of Homicide experience. He is highly religious, a recovering alcoholic and, as of the second season, going through a relatively civil divorce with his wife Linda. Stanley's reputation is threatened in season three by the resurfacing of an old case, resulting in his alcoholism coming to light and, as a result, he takes extended leave from Homicide. He is seen to have a very proper nature and a generally by-the-book approach, but can be extremely emotional and more unpredictable in certain cases, usually ones involving serial offenders.

Detective Sergeant Matt Ryan (Damien Richardson, 82 episodes, seasons 1–5) is the sergeant of the team. His police career is implied to be a reaction to the disappearance of his mother 16 years before the series begins; in the season one finale, her body is finally recovered and her murder solved. In the first three seasons, Matt is a senior constable working with the others, but early in season four he sits the sergeant exam and passes with flying colours, and is permitted to return to Homicide and take up a sergeant position under Stanley. Although he is a competent detective, Matt struggles greatly with authority, and is often inadvertently undermined by the team. In early episodes, he is implied to have a crush on Jennifer, but this soon abates and he begins a long-term relationship with artist Emma between seasons two and four.

Detective Senior Constable Jennifer Mapplethorpe (Nadine Garner, 79 episodes, seasons 1–5) is one of the Homicide squad of detectives. In the pilot episode, she is introduced as a temporary replacement for a suspended Duncan, but later earns a permanent place on the team. She is a former member of the Fraud squad, and was also an undercover operative of the Secret Service with Nick. Jennifer considers herself married to the job, with Nick being her only genuine love interest over the course of the show. She is often the most compassionate detective on the squad, and on more than one occasion finds herself targeted by perpetrators of crimes against children.

Detective Senior Constable Duncan Freeman (Aaron Pedersen, 78 episodes, seasons 1–5) is a member of the squad. Duncan's tenure in Homicide is second in length only to Matt's, but his hotheaded behaviour and rejection of authority frequently gets him into trouble. Duncan was engaged to a recovering drug addict named Claire in the first season, but an alleged affair and her drug relapse ended the engagement. Claire is later arrested for drug possession and is placed in one of Terry Jarvis' sting operations in exchange for the charges being dropped, but is killed in an ensuing shootout, which deeply saddens Duncan. In later seasons, Duncan seems to get his temper under control, though his relationship with Jarvis remains fraught with tension.

Detective Senior Constable Simon Joyner (Daniel Macpherson, 54 episodes, seasons 1–4) is a former member of the Homicide team. Simon is an experienced detective, having joined the squad before the pilot episode. He possesses a slightly immature personality, and is occasionally reprimanded for not taking cases seriously. Throughout the series, Simon's mental health and ability to deal with the emotional demands of the job are called into question, and he entertains resignation at least twice. This comes to a head in season three, where his ongoing issues later result in assault, corruption and murder charges being levied against him. Although the charges are later dropped, he does quit in the second episode of season four, and is never seen or mentioned again.

Detective Senior Constable Allie Kingston (Nadia Townsend, 47 episodes, seasons 3–5) is a member of Homicide. Added to the team in the season three premiere, Allie immediately steps on the toes of Simon, and the two share a tense relationship until his departure. Allie often acts first and thinks second, and her impulsive behaviour gets her in a lot of trouble with Stanley, Jarvis and Waverley, who readily admits that she does not like Allie and does not consider her a good detective. A champion runner, Allie joined the police force to escape the overbearing clutches of her mother, who has not spoken to her in years. Late in season four, Allie begins an illicit relationship with Rhys, which jeopardises their careers and earns Allie even more bad will with Waverley.

Detective Senior Constable Nick Buchanan (John Adam, 44 episodes, seasons 3–5) is a member of the Homicide squad. Nick is a later addition to the current team, first introduced in the season three episode "Thai Takeaway", but has worked in Homicide before, and was friends with Simon and Matt before joining the team. He also worked undercover with Jennifer before she joined Homicide, a fact which is unknown to the rest of the squad until late in season four. Nick is shown to be a highly competent detective, but his reputation is left in tatters after corruption allegations in season five.

Detective Senior Constable Rhys Levitt (Ryan O'Kane, 21 episodes, seasons 4–5) is the newest addition to the team. A direct replacement for both Simon and Matt (after he becomes a sergeant), Rhys is a well-educated but inexperienced officer. He holds a Master's in psychology from Oxford University, which brings about his nickname "Oxford", and his job in Homicide is his first-ever position in the police force. It is later revealed that Rhys is the nephew of Waverley, leading to many members of the team coming to the conclusion that Rhys exerted influence over his aunt to get him the prestigious position. Rhys does later prove himself a skilled detective and a very loyal member of the team, although is next to useless in any sort of physical situation. He has an affair with Allie in season four, but this quickly ends for the sake of their careers.

Commander Bernice Waverley (Noni Hazlehurst, 77 episodes, seasons 1–5) is the undisputed boss of Homicide. She began as the Superintendent of Homicide; however, in season two this position was jeopardised by corruption charges that were brought about by the brother of a former police officer who committed suicide after Waverley refused him a pension payout. Although the accusations were proven to be false, the brother's final revenge on Waverley involved killing her son, in the season two finale. Waverley takes time off to recover and then returns to Homicide to fill Stanley's role, under Jarvis, while he is on extended leave. Once Stanley returns, Waverley is once again promoted above Jarvis to become the Commander of Crime, a position which necessitated her becoming less involved in day-to-day Homicide investigations.

=== Semi-regular cast ===
Detective Superintendent Terry Jarvis (David Field, seasons 1–5) begins as the no-nonsense superintendent of the Drug Squad that botches the sting operation that killed Duncan's fiancée Claire, which creates a huge amount of tension and anger between the two. In the second season, Jarvis fills in for Waverley as Homicide Superintendent - a position which he excels in, and enjoys. He remains as Homicide Superintendent for the remainder of the series, after Waverley is promoted above him. Unlike Waverley, Jarvis remains highly involved in most Homicide investigations, often undermining Stanley and running the investigation himself. As a boss, Jarvis maintains frosty relationships with most of his team, particularly Duncan and Allie.

Detective Senior Sergeant Claudia Leigh (Tasma Walton, seasons 2–4) is a psychological profiler brought in to some Homicide investigations to analyse the mentality of offenders. She often provides scintillating insights that assist greatly in investigations concerning particularly heinous crimes. In season three, Claudia also becomes a psychological sponsor for Simon through his downward spiral, trying to help him wherever she can. In season four, her psychological manipulation of offenders backfires when she is attacked by a serial killer who tries to rape and kill her; attempts thwarted by the quick-thinking actions of Jennifer and Claudia. She exhibits a very friendly demeanour, and maintains positive working relationships with everyone on the squad, even Jarvis, who refers to her as "Mrs. Freud".

Dr. Rhonda "Ronnie" Lafferty (Genevieve Morris, seasons 2–5) is a head pathologist with the city morgue whose specialisation is autopsies relating to suspicious deaths, therefore integrating her with the Homicide squad. Ronnie is a highly competent and upstanding medical examiner, and believes that all murder victims deserve a chance at being investigated. Ronnie has two teenage children that she cares deeply for, although she occasionally avoids them during particularly gruesome cases involving children to prevent frightening them. Ronnie is regarded by the entire team as an indispensable asset to their investigations, and develops friendships with everyone, especially Jennifer and Nick.

Josh Waverley (William Jarratt, seasons 1–2) is the teenage son of Bernice. He is first introduced in season one as being very polite and well mannered, although in later appearances he is seen to have substantial issues with bullying and violence. The Shannon Pierce case tests Josh's relationship with his mother, as he himself is demonised by his peers after she is accused of corruption. Josh's final appearance is in the season two finale, where his wrists are slashed by Pierce's brother to punish Bernice. His death has a debilitating effect on his mother, who struggles to cope, even after years.

Sergeant Karen Hatzic (Louise Crawford, seasons 1–3) is a uniform police officer often assigned to the day-to-day duties related to Homicide investigations, such as retrieving files, guarding suspects and witnesses and coordinating canvasses and doorknocks. In season two, Hatzic is taken hostage along with Jennifer and Wilton, but survives the ordeal and returns to work soon after.

Detective Senior Sergeant Wilton Sparkes (Marshall Napier, seasons 1–2, 4) is the leader of the additional Homicide squad. Sparkes' team is supplementary to Stanley's, and his squad is often assigned to paperwork and more mundane investigations, thus associating a stigma to being on this squad. Sparkes is married to an unfaithful wife, Lorraine, who carries on an affair with Simon throughout the first half of season one. In the pilot, Sparkes finds out about this indiscretion and threatens to tell Stanley, whose highly religious nature makes him unlikely to sympathise with Simon; however, he sustains a heart attack before he can tell Stanley. Sparkes later returns to Homicide in the primary squad, working underneath Stanley, and develops a working relationship with Simon. Early in season two, Sparkes is demoted to a uniform position after revealing secret Homicide information to a friend so he could collect the reward money offered in an investigation, and has his final appearance early in season four when a murder victim is discovered in Sparkes' division. Sparkes is perceived to be quite sexist and old-fashioned, and thus has tense relationships with Jennifer and Allie.

=== Recurring cast ===
Senior Constable Phillippa Stern (Miles Paras, seasons 2–4), a "uniform" assigned to Homicide operations working under Karen Hatzic.

Linda Wolfe (Carolyn Bock, seasons 1–3), Stanley's wife and mother of their children.

Emma Treadgold (Meredith Penman, seasons 2–4), Matt's girlfriend, an artist.

Dr. Sam "Mack the Knife" McIntyre (Gil Tucker, seasons 1–3), one of the pathologists assigned to Homicide cases.

Judith Welling (Fiona Corke, seasons 1–2), a passionate attorney and friend of Stanley's.

Paul Winston (Cameron Nugent, seasons 1–4), a computer and technical specialist.

Senior Constable Todd Croft (Nick Jamieson, seasons 3–5), a "uniform" assigned to Homicide operations working under Karen Hatzic.

Assistant Commissioner Bill Mulholland (John McTernan, seasons 1–2), Waverley's direct superior.

=== Guests ===
Actor	Character	Tenure
Alex Menglet	Walter Pankor	1 episode
Amanda Muggleton	Cathy Booth	Episode: "Lie Down with Dogs"
Andrew Blackman	Scott Cousins	1 episode
Anna Lise Phillips	Kylie Barnett	1 episode
Blair McDonough	Cameron Gunning	Season 2, episode: "Golden"
Brett Climo	Victor Carling	1 episode
Brett Swain	Mick Conlon	1 episode
Bruce Spence	Maurice	1 episode
Caroline Brazier	Frances Deerborne	Episode: "Family Planning"
Christopher Milne	Jim Montague	1 episode
Costas Kilias	Kostas Emmanouel	Season 4, episode 13: "Once Bitten"
Craig McLachlan	Leon Grasby	Season 2, episode: "Golden"
Damien Bodie	Ben Corrigan	
Daniel Collopy	Clive Manning	2 episodes
Daniela Farinacci	Marion Palmer	Season 1, episode: "Baby Love"
Danielle Carter	Celia Joyner / Danielle Fraser	2 episodes
Debra Byrne	Marijke Sharman	1 episode
Derryn Hinch	Richard Hill	Season 4, episode: "Empowerment"
Eliza Taylor	Melissa Standish	1 episode
Gareth Yuen	Li Phat Lung	1 episode
Gary Waddell	Bruno Lilley	1 episode
Gemma Bishop	Caroline Joyner	1 episode
Georgie Parker	Susan Blake	Season 4, 2 episodes: "Aussie! Aussie! Aussie!" & "Good Cop/Bad Cop"
Gerard Kennedy		
Greg Stone	Dean Palmer	1 episode
Jacek Koman	Andro	1 episode
Jack Finsterer	Jeremy Burns	2 episodes
Jacqueline Brennan	Bonnie Roper	1 episode
Jane Allsop	Jo Andrews	1 episode
Jeremy Stanford	Eric Gorman	1 episode
Julia Blake	Hilda Conway	1 episode
Kate Jenkinson	Lara Conlon	1 episode
Kim Krejus	Dr Margaret Manson	2 episodes
Kym Gyngell	Adam Boldt	1 episode
Laura Gordon	Andrea	1 episode
Laurence Breuls	Ricky Sterling	1 episode
Lesley Baker	Miriam Toffler	2 episodes
Louise Siversen	Janice Quinn	1 episode
Lucia Smyrk	Monica Jones	1 episode
Lucy Bell	Debra Van Der Lind	1 episode
Margot Robbie	Caitlin Brentford	Season 2, episode 2: "Somersaulting Dogs"
Mark Raffety	Steven Akkerman	1 episode
Marnie Reece-Wilmore	Bridget Mangus	1 episode
Martin Sacks	Daniel Worthington	Season 4, episode: "Flight Risk"
Marty Fields	Zack Roberts	2 episodes
Michael Veitch	Scott Meyers	1 episode
Michele Fawdon	Beverley Cowles	1 episode
Nell Feeney	Kitty Bancroft	Season 4, episode 6: "Last Seen"
Nicholas Bell	Gordon / Mark	2 episodes
Nick Simpson-Deeks	Lleyton Brenner	1 episode
Nina Landis	Valerie Zimmerman	2 episodes
Osamah Sami	Hanif Durrani / Kasim Al-Basri	2 episodes
Paul Mercurio	D'Arcy Carlton	1 episode
Peta Brady	Kim Charlton	2 episodes
Peter Curtin	Leigh Carrington	1 episode
Peter Kowitz	Snr Sgt Paddy O'Connell	1 episode
Peter Moon	Lars Keller	1 episode
Peter O'Brien	Warren Endicott	Season 2, episode: "Guilty As Charged"
Petra Yared	Megan Chisholm-Walsh / Michelle Johnson	2 episodes
Ra Chapman	Destiny	1 episode
Rebel Wilson	Sarah Gilbert	Season 3, episode: "Dead Weight"
Richard Carter	Larry Klein	2 episodes
Roxane Wilson	Myra Rawlings	1 episode
Sarah Peirse	Lucille Neades	1 episode
Simon Lyndon	Josh Braddock	1 episode
Spencer McLaren	Kevin Stockton	1 episode
Sue Jones	Paulette Goddard	2 episodes
Syd Brisbane	Brian Hocking	1 episode
Tegan Higginbotham	Jana Mellor	1 episode
Terry Norris	Bill Lalor	1 episode
Tiriel Mora	Gerald Fox	1
Tony Nikolakopoulos	Jackson Pittman	1 episode
Tracy Mann	Melissa Gordon	1 episode

== Episodes ==
Series	Episodes	Originally released		Average viewership (in millions)
Series	Episodes	First released	Last released	Average viewership (in millions)
1	14	28 August 2007	19 November 2007	1.603
2	22	30 June 2008	29 March 2009	1.634
3	18	10 August 2009	25 November 2009	1.313
4	24	14 July 2010	16 February 2011	0.910
No Greater Honour	6	23 February 2011	30 March 2011	0.650

== Ratings ==
=== Weekly ratings ===
The following table shows the weekly ratings for the series. Season two has been split into two parts as season two aired in two television seasons.

The data is based on the five Metropolitan markets only.

# (Series)	#	Episode	AU air date	Timeslot	Viewers (m)	Nightly rank	Weekly rank
Season 1
1	1	"In the Hands of Giants (Part 1)"	28 August 2007	8:30 pm Monday	1.648		
2	2	"In the Hands of Giants (Part 2)"	28 August 2007	8:30 pm Monday	1.648		
3	3	"Lie Down with Dogs"	3 September 2007	8:30 pm Monday	1.717		
4	4	"The Return"	10 September 2007	8:30 pm Monday	1.401		
5	5	"Ripe Fruits in the Garden"	17 September 2007	8:30 pm Monday	1.562		
6	6	"Envelope Day"	24 September 2007	8:30 pm Monday	1.287		
7	7	"Baby Love"	1 October 2007	8:30 pm Monday	1.762		
8	8	"Victims of Crime"	8 October 2007	8:30 pm Monday	1.635		
9	9	"Family Planning"	15 October 2007	8:30 pm Monday	1.695		
10	10	"The Promised Land"	22 October 2007	8:30 pm Monday	1.570		
11	11	"Serious Men"	29 October 2007	8:30 pm Monday	1.583		
12	12	"Cut and Dried"	5 November 2007	8:30 pm Monday	1.559		
13	13	"Rostered Day Off"	12 November 2007	8:30 pm Monday	1.722		
14	14	"Raising The Dead"	19 November 2007	8:30 pm Monday	1.763		
Season 2
15	1	"Thicker Than Water"	30 June 2008	8:30 pm Monday	1.611	2	
16	2	"Somersaulting Dogs"	7 July 2008	8:30 pm Monday	1.583	1	
17	3	"In House"	14 July 2008	8:30 pm Monday	1.601	1	
18	4	"Taniwha"	21 July 2008	8:30 pm Monday	1.571	2	
19	5	"Guilty As Charged"	28 July 2008	8:30 pm Monday	1.533	4	
20	6	"Reward"	25 August 2008	8:30 pm Monday	1.888	1	
21	7	"Golden"	1 September 2008	8:30 pm Monday	1.698	3	
22	8	"Life After Death"	8 September 2008	8:30 pm Monday	1.789	1	
23	9	"Never To Be Released"	15 September 2008	8:30 pm Monday	1.854	1	
24	10	"Examination Day"	22 September 2008	8:30 pm Monday	1.506	4	
25	11	"Oh Lucky Man"	29 September 2008	8:30 pm Monday	1.670	1	
26	12	"Spoils of War"	6 October 2008	8:30 pm Monday	1.701	1	
27	13	"Jury Duty"	13 October 2008	8:30 pm Monday	1.429	4	
28	14	"Jane Doe"	20 October 2008	8:30 pm Monday	1.446	5	
29	15	"Junkie"	8 February 2009	8:30 pm Sunday	1.361	7	19
30	16	"Stolen Sweets"	15 February 2009	8:30 pm Sunday	1.201	8	21
31	17	"The Forgotten"	22 February 2009	8:30 pm Sunday	1.086	8	29
32	18	"A Green Light"	1 March 2009	8:30 pm Sunday	1.253	5	18
33	19	"House of Horrors"	8 March 2009	8:30 pm Sunday	1.189	5	21
34	20	"The Cutting Edge"	15 March 2009	8:30 pm Sunday	1.165	10	26
35	21	"Rage"	22 March 2009	8:30 pm Sunday	1.203	9	22
36	22	"Life and Death"	29 March 2009	8:30 pm Sunday	1.307	6	20
Season 3
37	1	"The Money Shot"	10 August 2009	8:30 pm Monday	1.321	5	16
38	2	"Meet and Greet"	10 August 2009	8:30 pm Monday	1.142	11	34
39	3	"Chop Shop"	17 August 2009	8:30 pm Monday	1.389	3	10
40	4	"The First Stone"	24 August 2009	8:30 pm Monday	1.334	3	9
41	5	"Thai Take Away"	31 August 2009	8:30 pm Monday	1.388	3	9
42	6	"The Confession"	7 September 2009	8:30 pm Monday	1.262	6	11
43	7	"Little Big Man"	14 September 2009	8:30 pm Monday	1.189	8	23
44	8	"Time of Your Life"	16 September 2009	8:30 pm Wednesday	1.175	6	24
45	9	"Diggers"	23 September 2009	8:30 pm Wednesday	1.154	8	
46	10	"Blood Trail"	30 September 2009	8:30 pm Wednesday	0.796	14	
47	11	"Hot House"	7 October 2009	8:30 pm Wednesday	0.876	15	
48	12	"Baker's Dozen = 13"	14 October 2009	8:30 pm Wednesday	1.032	13	
49	13	"Smokescreen"	21 October 2009	8:30 pm Wednesday	0.989	10	
50	14	"Mission Statement"	28 October 2009	8:30 pm Wednesday	1.192	6	
51	15	"Dead Weight"	4 November 2009	8:30 pm Wednesday	1.161	8	
52	16	"Big Bang Theory"	11 November 2009	8:30 pm Wednesday	1.130	5	
53	17	"In Wolf's Clothing"	18 November 2009	8:30 pm Wednesday	1.021	10	
54	18	"Whistleblower"	25 November 2009	8:30 pm Wednesday	1.010	10	
Season 4
55	1	"Aussie! Aussie! Aussie!"	14 July 2010	8:30 pm Wednesday	0.936	12	45
56	2	"Good Cop/Bad Cop"	14 July 2010	8:30 pm Wednesday	0.936	12	45
57	3	"Flight Risk"	21 July 2010	8:30 pm Wednesday	0.808	16	51
58	4	"Protection"	28 July 2010	8:30 pm Wednesday	0.911	17	49
59	5	"Ratters"	4 August 2010	8:30 pm Wednesday	0.923	16	53
60	6	"Last Seen"	11 August 2010	8:30 pm Wednesday	1.007	15	40
61	7	"No Smoke"	18 August 2010	8:30 pm Wednesday	0.948	15	44
62	8	"In Harm's Way"	25 August 2010	8:30 pm Wednesday	0.771	23	77
63	9	"The Hit"	1 September 2010	8:30 pm Wednesday	0.903	20	52
64	10	"Just Desserts"	8 September 2010	8:30 pm Wednesday	0.851	16	51
65	11	"Pirates"	15 September 2010	8:30 pm Wednesday	0.824	19	82
66	12	"Tomato Can"	22 September 2010	8:30 pm Wednesday	1.014	12	
67	13	"Once Bitten"	29 September 2010				
68	14	"Twilight Zone"	6 October 2010				
69	15	"Reunion"	13 October 2010				
70	16	"Undercover"	20 October 2010				
71	17	"Gut Instinct"	27 October 2010				
72	18	"Killer Moves"	3 November 2010				
73	19	"Ties That Bind"	10 November 2010				
74	20	"Atonement"	17 November 2010				
75	21	"The Price of Love"	24 November 2010				
76	22	"Empowerment"	24 November 2010				
77	23	"The Business of Fear"	9 February 2011				
78	24	"Secret Love"	16 February 2011				
"No Greater Honour"
79	1	"Reward Day"	23 February 2011				
80	2	"Go Down Swinging"	2 March 2011				
81	3	"If It Bleeds, It Leads"	9 March 2011				
82	4	"Tangled Web"	15 March 2011				
83	5	"Last Man Standing"	23 March 2011				
84	6	"Ghosts"	30 March 2011				

Episode six was broadcast on Monday 24 September in Sydney and Brisbane as per usual but was broadcast in Melbourne, Adelaide and Perth on Wednesday 26 September due to the broadcast of the 2007 Brownlow Medal count.

== Home media ==
All series were made available on DVD. The season 3 DVD included the first eight episodes of Season 4, while the season 4 DVD included the remainder of season 4 episodes plus the six-part miniseries No Greater Honour.

These DVD releases are now out of print. It was announced in June 2022 that Via Vision Entertainment would be re-releasing the complete series of City Homicide on 7 September 2022.

=== DVD Release ===
Season	Date Released	Episodes	Discs	Special Features	Distributors
The Complete 1st Series	2 September 2009	14	4	None	Roadshow Entertainment
The Complete 2nd Series	1 July 2010	22	6	None	Roadshow Entertainment
The Complete 3rd Series	18 November 2010	26	6	None	Roadshow Entertainment
The Complete 4th Series & No Greater Honour Mini Series	21 April 2011	22	5	None	Roadshow Entertainment
The Complete Series (Seasons 1–4)	14 September 2014	84	21	None	Roadshow Entertainment
The Complete Series	7 September 2022	84	21	None	Via Vision Entertainment
The Complete Series	4 September 2024	84	21	TBC	Via Vision Entertainment

=== Online streaming ===
Title	Format	Episodes #	Release date	Status	Distributors
City Homicide: Season 01	Streaming	14	September 2018	Expired	7plus
City Homicide: Season 02	Streaming	18	September 2018	Expired	7plus
City Homicide: Season 03	Streaming	22	September 2018	Expired	7plus
City Homicide: Season 04	Streaming	22	September 2018	Expired	7plus
City Homicide: Season 05	Streaming	08	September 2018	Expired	7plus

== Broadcast and distribution ==
Country	Network	Airs
Australia	Seven Network	Wednesdays 9:30 pm
New Zealand	TV ONE	Mondays 10:55 pm
Canada	Super Channel	Thursdays 10 pm
Denmark	DR1	Weeknights
Norway	TVNorge	
Estonia	Fox Crime	
France	France 3	Fridays 11:25 pm
Ireland	RTÉ One	Sundays 4:30 am
Netherlands	Veronica	
Africa	Daar Communications	
Iran	Channel 1	Sunday 10:15 pm
United States	Hulu Plus, and until the end of Season 4, Amazon Prime	Available for streaming
