= John McTernan (actor) =

Australian actor

- Born: United States
- Occupation: Actor
- Years active: 1971–2014
- Known for: Cop Shop; G.P.

John McTernan is an Australian actor, known for several theatre and television roles.

== Early life ==
A former sailor, McTernan emigrated to Australia from the United States in 1968. After graduating from university with an Economics degree, he began studying at Sydney's Ensemble Theatre.

== Career ==
=== Theatre ===
McTernan's first job was singing and dancing in cabaret shows. One of his earliest professional jobs was in a vocal comedy act with friend Timothy Bean, both writing and performing their material. He went on to work in theatre for seven years in Sydney, performing "everything from Godspell to Shakespeare".

He has appeared with all of Australia's major theatre companies. His Sydney Theatre Company credits include The Sunny South and The Caucasian Chalk Circle. His work at the Melbourne Theatre Company includes Born Yesterday, Twelfth Night, Into the Woods, Assassins, The Glass Menagerie, The Real Thing, Serious Money, High Society, Art, Take Me Out and Boy Gets Girl. Plays for Nimrod Theatre Company include Young Mo, Volpone, Inside the Island, The Orestia, Clouds, Romeo and Juliet, Henry IV and Comedy of Errors. He has also appeared in several productions at Ensemble Theatre, including Lovers, The Comedians, Boy Meets Girl, 6 Rms Riv Vu, Sonny and Same Difference and more recently, Wrong Turn at Lungfish in 2008.

In 2014, McTernan took over the lead role of Shelley Levine at the last minute in a Melbourne Theatre Company production of Glengarry Glen Ross, after Steve Bisley had to relinquish the role during the play's opening week, due to illness.

McTernan is also well known for his work in musical theatre. He performed in a Harry M. Miller production of Grease at Melbourne's Metro Theatre, in 1972, just three months after its Broadway debut. In 1975, he took on the task of the narrator in Joseph and the Amazing Technicolor Dreamcoat, in a production that featured Mark Holden in the titular role of Joseph. In 1979, he appeared in two-act musical comedy The Venetian Twins, for the inaugural season of the Sydney Theatre Company, which premiered at the Sydney Opera House. The production went on to tour throughout 1981 to Canberra, Adelaide, Melbourne and Geelong.

In 1986, McTernan played Benny Southstreet in an Adelaide Festival Centre production of Guys and Dolls, alongside Anthony Warlow, which was consistently met with standing ovations and rave reviews in Adelaide, Melbourne and Sydney. He reprised the role in a fundraiser concert spectacular at Melbourne Concert Hall in 1990, and then again for The Production Company in 2000. More recently, McTernan has appeared as Grandfather in a 2019 staging of Ragtime, once again for The Production Company.

McTernan's other musical credits include Godspell, Sunset Boulevard, The History of Australia, Shout, Into the Woods, and Assassins, She Loves Me, Gypsy and How to Succeed in Business Without Really Trying.

=== Film and television ===
McTernan is best known to television audiences for his roles in popular Australian drama series and soap operas. He played the regular role of Rob Forsyth, a gay man, later revealed to be a psychopathic blackmailer, in soap opera Number 96 in 1977. He took on a recurring guest role as prison teacher, Tom Lucas in Prisoner in 1986. The same year, he portrayed music promoter Lee Gordon in two-part biographical miniseries Shout! The Story of Johnny O'Keefe, about the life of musician Johnny O'Keefe (played by Terry Serio).

McTernan's long-running series credits included a role in long-running police drama Cop Shop, as Irish Detective Sergeant Tom Shannon from 1981 to 1994, and a main role in medical drama G.P. as Dr Robert Sharp, who ran a suburban medical practice together with his uncle William Sharp (played by Michael Craig) in its first four seasons from 1989 to 1992. He won Logie Awards for his roles in both series. In 2005, he played a main role as villain Mackenna in children's drama series Scooter: Secret Agent.

McTernan's numerous other television credits have included The Young Doctors, The Flying Doctors, City Homicide, All Saints, Blue Heelers, Stingers, Something in the Air, Good Guys, Bad Guys, MDA and Miss Fisher’s Murder Mysteries.

McTernan's work in feature films and made-for-television movies has included The Understudy (1977), ABC feature Fuzzy (1984), The Brown Out Murders (1988), The Four Minute Mile (1988) and Evil Never Dies (2003).

== Filmography ==
=== Film ===
Year	Title	Role	Type
1988	The Brown Out Murders	Philippe Mora	
2002	Guru Wayne	Professor Barret	
2007	Pension Day	The Pensioner	Short film

=== Television ===
Year	Title	Role	Type
1974	The Toy Factory	Sustaining Lead	
1976	The Understudy		TV movie
1977	Number 96	Rob Forsyth	36 episodes
1978	Barnaby and Me (aka Fuzzy)	Secretary	TV movie
1978	The Young Doctors		
1978	The Oracle	Co-lead	
1981–1983	Cop Shop	Detective Tom Shannon	282 episodes
1984	Five Mile Creek	Father Jenkins	1 episode
1984	The Last Bastion	Colonel Willoughby	Miniseries, 3 episodes
1985	Special Squad	Ted	Episode 22: "Mates"
1985	Zoo Family	Mr Macleod	1 episode
1986	Shout! The Story of Johnny O'Keefe	Lee Gordon	Miniseries, 2 episodes
1986	Death of a Soldier	Colonel Williams	TV movie
1987	Prisoner	Tom Lucas	6 episodes
1987	The Flying Doctors	Jim Brett	1 episode
1987	Nancy Wake	Antoine	Miniseries, 2 episodes
1988	The Four Minute Mile	Dave Garroway	TV movie
1989–1991	G.P.	Dr Robert Sharp	123 episodes
1995	The Feds: Abduction	Alan Guinnane	Miniseries, 1 episode
1995	Snowy River: The McGregor Saga (aka The Man from Snowy River)	Connor O'Shea	1 episode
1995; 2000	Blue Heelers	Peter Carlson / Father Michael Carlyle	2 episodes
1997	Good Guys, Bad Guys	Chief Commissioner Fuller	1 episode
1999	All Saints	Geoff Cavendish	1 episode
2000–2003	Stingers	Jim Duncan / Prosecutor / Dr Dan Fraser	10 episodes
2001	Something in the Air	Owen Young	5 episodes
2002	MDA	Dr Michael Forsythe	2 episodes
2003	Evil Never Dies	Dr Calvert	TV movie
2005	Scooter: Secret Agent	Mackenna	26 episodes
2006–2007	City Homicide	Assistant Commissioner Bill Mulholland	5 episodes
2010	Killing Time	Justice Shepherd / Ian Watson	1 episode
2010	Judith Lucy's Spiritual Journey	Parish Priest	1 episode
2013	Miss Fisher's Murder Mysteries	Larry Dunn	1 episode

== Theatre ==
Year	Title	Role	Type
1971	Lovers	Joe	Ensemble Theatre, Sydney
1971	Same Difference		St Martins Theatre, Melbourne, Ensemble Theatre, Sydney
1972	Grease	Kenickie	Harry M. Miller Productions
1973	Godspell		Canberra Theatre, Her Majesty's Theatre, Melbourne, Princess Theatre, Launceston, Theatre Royal, Hobart with J. C. Williamson's
1974	What Did We Do Wrong?		Marian St Theatre, Sydney
1974	Scandals of '74		Macleay Theatre
1974	6 Rms Riv Vu		Ensemble Theatre, Sydney
1974	Sonny		Ensemble Theatre, Sydney
1974–1975	Joseph and the Amazing Technicolor Dreamcoat	Narrator	York Theatre, Sydney with Paradine Productions
1976	It's Called the Sugarplum	Wallace Zuckerman	Bankstown Town Hall, AMP Theatrette, Sydney with Q Theatre
1976	A Who's Who of Flapland		AMP Theatrette, Sydney with Q Theatre
1976	Comedians	Gethin Price	Ensemble Theatre, Sydney
1977	Boy Meets Girl	Robert Law	Ensemble Theatre, Sydney
1977	Young Mo	Barman / Lawyer	Nimrod Theatre, Sydney
1978	Stubble		Nimrod Theatre, Sydney
1978	Marxisms		Nimrod Theatre, Sydney
1978	Everyman		Nimrod Theatre, Sydney
1979	The Comedy of Errors	Dromio of Ephyesus	Nimrod Theatre, Sydney
1979	Henry IV	Gower / Silence / Peto / Edmund Mortimer	Nimrod Theatre, Sydney
1979	The Amazing Optissimo's Revue		Tasmanian Theatre Company
1979	Romeo and Juliet	Peter	Octagon Theatre, Perth, Nimrod Theatre, Sydney
1979	The Caucasian Chalk Circle	Galinski Delegate / Doctor / Old Man, Jussup / Irakli the Bandit / Old Man	Sydney Opera House with STC / NIDA
1979	The Venetian Twins	Arlecchino	Sydney Opera House with STC / Nimrod Theatre, Sydney
1980	The Sunny South	Johnny Jinks	Sydney Opera House with STC
1980	Clouds	Angel	Nimrod Theatre, Sydney
1980	The Orestia	Watchman / Aegisthus / Old Person of Aros – Agamemnon / Aegisthus – Elektra / Fury – Orestes	Nimrod Theatre, Sydney
1980	Inside the Island	Peter Blackwood	Nimrod Theatre, Sydney
1980	Volpone	Corbaccio	Nimrod Theatre, Sydney
1981	The Venetian Twins	Arlecchino	Festival Theatre, Adelaide with Nimrod Theatre Company
1983	The Real Thing	Max	Melbourne Athenaeum with MTC
1984	Pax Americana	The Journalist / Actor V	Playhouse, Melbourne with MTC
1984	The Glass Menagerie	Tom	Playhouse, Melbourne with MTC
1986	The Norman Conquests	Simon Hopkinson	MTC
1986–1987	Guys and Dolls	Benny Southstreet	Adelaide Festival Centre & National Theatre of Great Britain
1987	Twelfth Night	Feste	Playhouse, Melbourne with MTC
1987	The Common Pursuit	Humphrey	Russell St Theatre, Melbourne with MTC
1987	Wet and Dry	George	Russell St Theatre, Melbourne with MTC
1988	Manning Clark's History of Australia – The Musical	Captain Cook / Captain Bligh / Henry Parkes / Peter the Possum	Princess Theatre, Melbourne
1988	Serious Money	Durkfeld / Greville / Duckett / Goat / Gleeson	Wharf Theatre, Sydney, Russell St Theatre, Melbourne with MTC
1990	Gershwin – The Musical	Ira Gershwin	Melbourne Concert Hall with Victorian Arts Centre
1990	Guys and Dolls	Benny Southstreet	Melbourne Concert Hall fundraiser concert
1992–1993	High Society	C.K. Dexter Haven	Australian tour with QTC / MTC
1993	A Rare Jewel	Perce	Civic Theatre, Newcastle with Hunter Valley Theatre Company
1994	Oleanna	John	Subiaco Theatre Centre, Perth with Swy Theatre Company & Theatre West
1995	Assassins	Guiteau	Fairfax Studio, Melbourne with MTC
1995	Sanctuary	Bob King	Playhouse, Perth with New England Theatre Company
1996–1997	Sunset Boulevard	Manfred	Regent Theatre, Melbourne with Really Useful Productions
1998	Into the Woods	Baker	Playhouse, Melbourne with MTC
1999	Born Yesterday	Ed Devery	Playhouse, Melbourne with MTC
1999	Shark Fin Soup	Frank Harrow	Fairfax Studio, Melbourne with MTC
1999	She Loves Me	Ladislav Sipos	Melbourne Concert Hall with The Production Company
2000	Gypsy	Herbie	State Theatre, Melbourne with The Production Company
2000	Guys and Dolls	Benny Southstreet	State Theatre, Melbourne with The Production Company
2001	How to Succeed in Business Without Really Trying	Twimble / TV Announcer	State Theatre, Melbourne with The Production Company
2001	The Irish and How They	Ciaran O’	International Concert Attractions
2001	Shout! The Musical!	Lee Gordon	Jacobsen Entertainment
2002–2003	Art		Australian tour with MTC
2004	Take Me Out	Skipper / Danziger / Reporter	Playhouse, Melbourne with MTC
2005	Boy Gets Girl	Howard Siegel	Fairfax Studio, Melbourne with MTC
2008	Wrong Turn at Lungfish	Peter Ravenswaal	Ensemble Theatre, Sydney
2011	Xanadu	Danny Maguire / Zeus	Grand Xanadu Marquee, Melbourne
2013	The Crucible	Giles Corey	Southbank Theatre, Melbourne with MTC
2014	Glengarry Glen Ross	Shelly Levene	Southbank Theatre, Melbourne with MTC
2019	Ragtime	Grandfather	State Theatre, Melbourne with The Production Company

== Awards ==
Year	Work	Award	Category	Results	Ref.
1981	Cop Shop	Logie Awards	Best Lead Actor in a Series	Won	
1983	Cop Shop	Logie Awards	Best Lead Actor in a Series	Won	
1987	Twelfth Night	Green Room Awards	Best Supporting Actor	Won	
1990	G.P.	Logie Awards	Best Lead Actor in a Series	Nominated	
1991	G.P.	Logie Awards	Silver Logie for Most Outstanding Actor	Nominated	
1992	G.P.	Logie Awards	Silver Logie for Most Outstanding Actor	Won	
