= Noni Hazlehurst =

Australian actress

Noni Hazlehurst AM
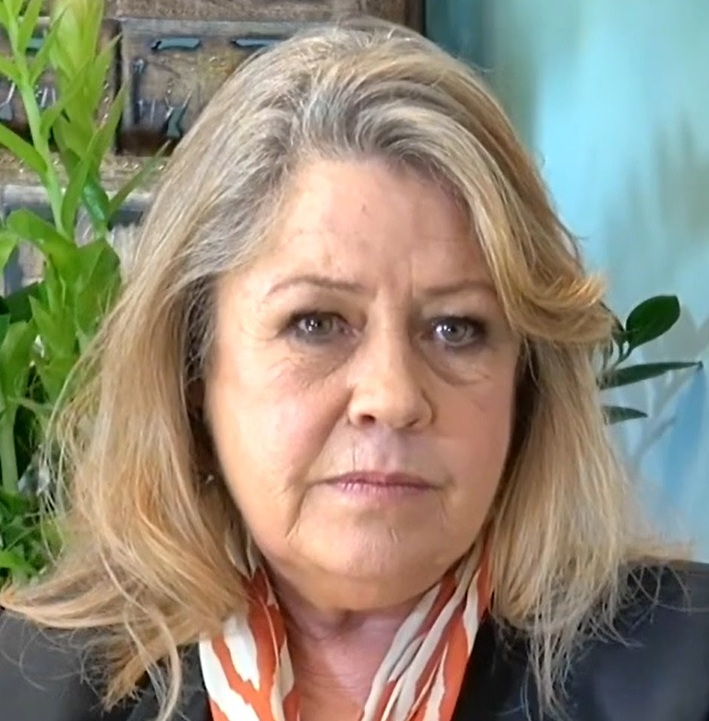
- Hazlehurst on Balance with Deborah Hutton in 2016
- Born: Leonie Elva Hazlehurst; Melbourne, Victoria, Australia
- Occupations: Actress; voice actress; director; writer; presenter; broadcaster
- Years active: c. 1973–present
- Known for: Play School (TV series) as presenter (1978–2001); Better Homes and Gardens (TV series) as presenter 1995–2005
- Notable work: Film: Monkey Grip; Fran; Little Fish; Television: The Box; The Sullivans; Nancy Wake; City Homicide; A Place to Call Home
- Spouses: Kevin James Dobson (m. 1975; div. 1978) John Jarratt (m. 1988; div. 1999)
- Partner: Ian Marden (2003–2013)
- Children: 2

Leonie Elva "Noni" Hazlehurst AM is an Australian actress, director, writer, presenter, and broadcaster who has appeared on television, radio and film since the early 1970s. Hazlehurst has been honoured with Australian Film Institute Awards, ARIA Awards and Logies, and was inducted into the Hall of Fame in 2016.

== Early life and education ==
Leonie Elva Hazelhurst, known as "Noni", was born in Melbourne in 1953.

After attending St Leonard's College in Brighton East, Victoria, Hazlehurst studied Drama at Flinders University in South Australia from 1971 to 1973; she resided at Flinders University Hall and graduated with a Bachelor of Arts degree in 1974.

Both of her parents were English, and they migrated to Australia in 1951.

== Career ==
=== Television ===
Along with roles at the ABC, her first television work was in guest lead roles in television serials produced by Crawford Productions. She played the regular role of Sharon Lewis in The Box in 1975 before joining the original cast of The Sullivans as Lil Duggan in late 1976. She was a Play School presenter from 1978 to 2001, and has been a National Ambassador or Patron for many children's events and charities, including Children's Week (1991-2007) and Barnardos. She has worked extensively for children. Hazlehurst has recorded several music and spoken word albums, including the children's music album Shout and Whisper (1988).

Hazlehurst appeared in the miniseries Nancy Wake (played the title role), as well as such films and miniseries as The Shiralee, Ride on Stranger, and Waterfront in the 1980s.

From 1995 to 2005, she hosted the Seven Networks Better Homes and Gardens, a lifestyle show which is affiliated with the monthly magazine of the same name.

In 2006, she starred in ABC's telemovie Stepfather of the Bride. From 2007 to 2011, she played Detective Superintendent Bernice Waverley on Channel Seven crime drama City Homicide. In 2010, she was a guest on The 7pm Project on Network Ten. In July 2011, as part of a rapidly growing internet meme, she read the book Go the Fuck to Sleep to camera in the style she formerly used on Play School. She immediately offered to record a reading of the book after being sent a copy by the publisher.

Beginning in 2013, she appeared as Elizabeth Bligh in the 1950s-set Australian melodrama A Place to Call Home on the Seven Network, playing the wealthy matriarch of the family. She played "Ambrose" in ABC TV's The Letdown (2017–2019), and as Pamela in The End (2020).

In 2023, Hazlehurst was named in the cast for One Night.

=== Film ===
Hazlehurst has had starring roles in Australian films since the 1980s, most notably as the lead, Nora, in Monkey Grip (1982), based on Helen Garner's novel of the same name. The film, concerning the relationship between a single mother and a heroin addict, was a modest box-office success in Australia and received generally favourable reviews from critics.

She later starred in Little Fish in 2005, Candy in 2006, and Bitter & Twisted in 2008. Later film roles include The Mule, Truth, The Broken Shore, and Ladies in Black.

=== Radio ===
Hazlehurst is a regular freelance presenter on 774 ABC Melbourne.

=== Theatre ===
Hazlehurst's theatrical roles include The Man from Mukinupin, On Our Selection, Traitors, Hamlet, No Names, No Packdrill, Cut and Thrust, Frankie & Johnny in the Claire De Lune, for the STC: Navigating (Dir: Marin Potts) The Breath of Life, Woman in Mind, for the MTC: Grace, (Dir: Marion Potts), Madagascar, (Dir: Sam Strong) and The Heretic, (Dir: Matt Scholten). In 2014 she appeared in a critically acclaimed production of The Beauty Queen of Leenane (Dir: Declan Eames) for the Kin Collective at 45 Downstairs.

In 2015 and 2016 Hazlehurst performed in a one-woman play, Mother, written for her by Daniel Keene; the show toured nationally. Her performance was described as burning up the stage with histrionic power and "a faultless character study". For her role in Mother, she was nominated for a Helpmann Awards for Best Performance by a Female Actor in a Play. Hazlehurst won the 2018 Matilda Award for Best Female Actor in a Leading Role for Mother.

Keene's second one-woman play for Hazlehurst, The Lark, was first performed in 2025.

== Awards and nominations ==
Year	Association	Category	Work	Result
1980	Logie Awards	Best Supporting Actress in a Series	Ride on Stranger	Won
1981	Australian Film Institute Awards	Best Actress in a Lead Role	Fatty Finn	Nominated
1982	Australian Film Institute Awards	Best Actress in a Lead Role	Monkey Grip	Won
1985	Australian Film Institute Awards	Best Actress in a Lead Role	Fran	Won
1985	Logie Awards	Best Supporting Actress in a Single Series	Waterfront	Nominated
1989	ARIA Awards	Best Children's Album	Shout and Whisper	Nominated
1989	Logie Awards	Most Popular Actress in a Miniseries/Telemovie	The Shiralee	Nominated
1990	ARIA Awards	Best Children's Album	Peter and the Wolf/Carnival of the Animals	Nominated
1992	ARIA Awards	Best Children's Album	Noni Sings Day and Night Songs and Rhymes from Play School	Nominated
2000	Australian Film Institute Awards	Best Performance by an Actress in a Leading Role in a Telefeature or Mini-Series	Waiting at the Royal	Won
2005	AACTA Awards	Best Supporting Actress	Little Fish	Won
2005	Film Critics Circle of Australia Awards	Best Actress in a Supporting Role	Little Fish	Won
2006	AACTA Awards	Best Supporting Actress	Candy	Nominated
2006	Film Critics Circle of Australia Awards	Best Actress in a Supporting Role	Candy	Nominated
2008	Australian Film Institute Awards	Best Actress	Bitter & Twisted	Nominated
2009	Film Critics Circle of Australia Awards	Best Actress	Bitter & Twisted	Won
2014	Equity Awards	Outstanding Performance by an Ensemble Cast: Drama Series	Redfern Now	Won
2015	Australian Film Critics Association Awards	Best Actress in a Supporting Role	The Mule	Nominated
2015	Helpmann Awards	Best Performance by a Female Actor in a Play	Mother	Nominated
2018	AACTA Awards	Best Supporting Actress	Ladies in Black	Nominated
2018	Film Critics Circle of Australia Awards	Best Actress in a Supporting Role	Ladies in Black	Won
2018	The Matilda Awards	Best Female Actor in a Leading Role	Mother	Won

=== Other awards ===
Year	Association	Achievement
1991	Variety Club of Australia	"Top Hat" Achievement Award
1995	National Honours	Member of the Order of Australia for her services to children and the performing arts
2016	Logie Awards	Logie Hall of Fame

Hazlehurst was awarded an Honorary Doctorate of Letters by her alma mater Flinders University in 2007.

She has been an ambassador for Barnardo's "Mother of the Year" awards.

== Cultural references ==
In 1994 a painting of Hazlehurst by artist Rosemary Valadon titled Noni Hazlehurst – Summer '94 Waiting Again was a finalist in the Archibald Prize.

== Personal life ==
Hazlehurst married director Kevin Dobson, and she subsequently married John Jarratt in circa 1987. She and Jarratt have two sons. After separating from Jarratt in August 1999, she dated cameraman Ian Marden.

Her son, William, is the former vocalist for Melbourne death pop band Storm The Sky.

Hazelhurst's autobiography Dropping The Mask was published in 2024, and was described by The Sydney Morning Herald as "a terrifically energising book, full of sweep and compassion and the delineation of doubt".

== Filmography ==
=== Television ===
Year	Title	Role	Notes
1973	Emergency Line	Regular role	TV series
1974	Bellbird	Guest role	TV series, 1 episode
1974	Division 4	Helen Jenkins / Jan Kennedy / Sarah Carr / Tania Clarke	TV series 4 episodes: What Will my Friends Say? (Season 7, episode 12); 1956 and All That (Season 7, episode 27); Just for Kicks (Season 7, episode 29)
1975	The Last of the Australians	Joanna	TV series Season 1 episode 6: The Hypocondriac
1975	The Box	Sharon Lewis	TV series
1975	Homicide	Linda Williams	TV series Season 12, episode 23: Long Weekend
1975	Matlock Police	Karen Simpson	TV series Season 5, episode 187: Forget Me Not, Episode 194: A Dangerous Sort of Man
1976–1977; 1981	The Sullivans	Lil / Lill Duggan	TV series, 132 episodes
1978	Case for the Defence	Julia	TV series Season 1 episode 5: "Without Consent"
1978–2002	Play School	Presenter	TV series, 186 episodes
1979	Ride on Stranger	Beryl	TV miniseries, 4 episodes
1979	Jokes	Various characters	TV series
1979	Patrol Boat		TV series, 1 episode
1979	TV Follies	Silver Le Bow	TV series Episode: Chicago
1976	The Judging Ring		
1978	Bit Part	Zelda	Teleplay
1983	The Weekly's War	Dorothy Drain	TV film
1986	The Fish Are Safe	Director	TV film
1983	For Love or Money	Narrator	Film documentary
1983	The Power of Stations	Narrator	Film documentary
1984	Waterfront	Maggie	TV miniseries, 3 episodes
1985	Anyone Can Be a Genius	Narrator	Film documentary
1985	Image Makers	Narrator	Film documentary
1985	A Country Practice		TV series, 2 episodes
1987	The Shiralee	Lily	TV miniseries, 2 episodes
1987	Nancy Wake	Nancy Wake	TV miniseries, 2 episodes
1988	Rafferty's Rules		TV series, 1 episode
1989	Naked Under Capricorn	Monica	TV miniseries, 2 episodes
1989	Fields Of Fire III	Dawn	TV miniseries, 2 episodes
1991	Paper Trail – Life and Times of a Woodchip	Narrator	TV documentary
1992	Clowning Around	Sarah Gunner	TV miniseries, 2 episodes
1992	Baby Crazy (aka Look Who's Talking)	Narrator	Film documentary
1992	My Special Place	Narrator	TV special
1992	A Tribute to Joan Sutherland and Richard Bonynge	Narrator	TV special
1994	Under the Skin		TV series, 1 episode: Grandma's Teeth
1994	Canberra – A Capital Idea	Narrator	TV documentary
1994	The Cause of Mary MacKillop	Narrator	Video
1994	When The Honeymoon Is Over	Narrator	Film documentary
1995	Lizzie's Library	Narrator	TV series
1996	Gateway to the Future	Narrator	TV documentary
1996	Twisted Tales	Anne Martin	TV series, season 1, episode 6: Dancing Partners
2000	Waiting at the Royal	Eloise	TV film Australian Film Institute Awards; 2000: Won – Best Performance by an Actress in a Leading Role in a Telefeature or Mini-Series
2006	Stepfather of the Bride	Sophie	TV film
2007	Curtin	Elsie Curtin	TV film
2007–2011	City Homicide	Bernice Waverley	TV series, 84 episodes
2009	The Librarians	Jan the midwife	TV series, 1 episode
2012	The 100+ Club	Narrator	TV film
2013	The Broken Shore	Sybil Cashin	TV film
2013	Redfern Now	Margaret	TV series, 1 episode
2013–2018	A Place to Call Home	Elizabeth Bligh / Elizabeth Goddard	TV series, 67 episodes
2017-19	The Letdown	Anbrose	TV series, 9 episodes
2020	The End	Pamela Hardy	TV series, 10 episodes
2020	Winding Road	Rachael	Podcast series
2021	Fires	Caris Mazzeo	TV miniseries, 1 episode
2022	Upright	Squirrel	TV series, 1 episode
2023	One Night	Mary	TV series: 5 episodes

=== Films ===
Year	Title	Role	Notes
1974	Parent Teacher Interviews	Miss Stevens	29 minutes (short)
1977	Ruby		
1977	The Getting of Wisdom		Feature film
1980	The Search For Harry Allway		
1980	The Wedding		
1982	Monkey Grip	Nora	
1983	Stations		
1990	Breaking Through	Therapist	52 minutes
1991	Waiting	Claire	Feature film
1994	Aesop's Fables		
1995	Grimm's Fairy Tales	Narrator	
2005	Little Fish	Janelle Heart	Feature film Won: AFI Award for Best Actress in a Supporting Role in 2005; Film Critics Circle of Australia Awards; ***2005 Best Actress in a Supporting Role
2006	Candy	Elaine Wyatt	Feature film Nominated: AFI Award for Best Actress in a Supporting Role in 2006
2008	Bitter & Twisted	Penelope Lombard	Feature film Nominated: AFI Award for Best Actress in 2008; Film Critics Circle of Australia Awards; ***2009 Best Actress
2008	Seven Seven Seven	Jess	32 minutes
2009	A Parachute Falling in Siberia	Katherine	14 minutes
2010	Tegan the Vegan	Mrs. Poodle / Mother (voice)	13 minutes
2014	The Mule	Judy Jenkins	Feature film
2015	Truth	Nicki Burkett	Feature film
2018	Della Mortika	Mrs. Crotchett Smythe	17 minutes
2018	Ladies in Black	Miss Cartwright	Feature film
2020	June Again	June	Feature film
2020	Wedding of the Year	Barb	Feature film
2021	Long Story Short	The Stranger	Feature film
2024	Sting	Helga	Feature film

=== Other appearances ===
Year	Title	Role	Notes	Ref
2019–2023	Every Family Has a Secret	Presenter	TV series, 10 episodes	
2019	Balance	Herself	Webseries, 1 episode	
2018	Who Do You Think You Are?	Herself	TV series, 1 episode	
2016	2016 TV Week Logie Awards	Herself – Logies Hall of Fame	TV special	
2016	Big Ted's Excellent Adventure: 50 Years of Play School	Herself	TV special	
2015	Australia: The Story of Us	Herself - Actor	TV series, 1 episode	
2010	Things My Mother Taught Me	Herself	TV series	
1998	Budget Makeovers	Presenter	TV special	
1997	Better Homes and Gardens: Great Australian Homes	Host	TV special	
1997	Ripsnorters	Herself	TV series, 1 episode	
1996	Play School 30th Birthday	Herself	TV special	
1996	The Edge of Instinct	Herself	TV documentary	
1995	Sydney Weekender Summer Special	Presenter	TV special	
1995–2004	Better Homes and Gardens	Host	TV series	
1993	How to Raise Happy Kids	Herself	Film documentary	
1992	Asthma in Under 5's	Herself	TV documentary	
1991	Play School's 25th Anniversary	Herself	TV special	
1991	Land of the Apocalypse	Herself	TV documentary	
1990	Working Actor Series	Herself	Film documentary	
1982	A Creative Partnership – The Actor and the Director	Herself	Film documentary	
