= Mad Dog Morgan =

1976 film

- Theatrical film poster
- Directed by: Philippe Mora
- Screenplay by: Philippe Mora
- Based on: Morgan: The Bold Bushranger by Margaret Carnegie
- Produced by: Jeremy Thomas
- Starring: Dennis Hopper; Jack Thompson; David Gulpilil; Frank Thring; Michael Pate
- Cinematography: Mike Molloy
- Edited by: John Scott
- Music by: Patrick Flynn
- Production company: Motion Picture Productions
- Distributed by: British Empire Films
- Release dates: 9 July 1976 (Australia); 22 September 1976 (United States)
- Running time: 99 minutes
- Country: Australia
- Language: English
- Budget: A$450,000 or $473,875

Mad Dog Morgan is a 1976 Australian bushranger film directed by Philippe Mora and starring Dennis Hopper, Jack Thompson and David Gulpilil. It is based upon the life of Dan Morgan.

== Plot ==
Dan Morgan witnesses a bloody massacre of Chinese immigrants on the goldfields and turns into a robber. He is arrested and sent to prison for six years where he is tormented and raped. He is let out on parole and becomes a bushranger, befriending an Aboriginal man, Billy. Morgan fights against the vicious Superintendent Francis Cobham and is eventually killed.

== Cast ==
- Dennis Hopper as Dan Morgan
- Jack Thompson as Detective Manwaring
- David Gulpilil as Billy
- Frank Thring as Superintendent Francis Cobham
- Michael Pate as Superintendent Winch
- Wallas Eaton as Ewan Macpherson
- Bill Hunter as Sergeant Smith
- John Hargreaves as Henry Baylis
- Martin Harris as John Wendlan
- Robin Ramsay as Roget
- Graeme Blundell as Italian Jack
- Gregory Apps as Arthur
- Liza Lee-Atkinson as Barmaid
- Elaine Baillie as Farm Girl
- Don Barkham as John Morrow
- Kurt Beimel as Dr. Wiliam Dobbyn
- David Bracks as John McLean
- Liddy Clark as Alice
- Peter Collingwood as Judge Raymond Barry
- Peter Cummins as Thomas Gibson
- John Derum as Evan Evans
- Gerry Duggan as Martin
- Max Fairchild as Prisoner
- Chuck Faulkner as Sergeant Montford
- Judith Fisher as Mrs. Warby
- Alan Hardy as Bob
- Isobel Harley as Mrs. Macpherson
- David John as John Evans
- Norman Kaye as Swagman
- Hugh Keays-Byrne as Simon
- Kevin Leslie as Maples
- Robert McDarra as Parole Officer
- Dennis Miller as Prison Boat Guard
- David Mitchell as Haley
- Christopher Pate as Roget's Assistant
- Grant Page as David Maginnity
- Philip Ross as Samuel Watson
- Bruce Spence as John Heriot
- Peter Thompson as Mayor
- Roger Ward as Trooper
- Ken Weaver as Bond
- Terry Gill as Extra
- Garry Meadows as Extra
- Jon Finlayson as Extra

== Production ==
=== Development ===
Mad Dog Morgan is based on the book Morgan: The Bold Bushranger by Margaret Frances Carnegie, which she researched over 12 years. (Carnegie would be involved in helping find locations for the movie.)

Philippe Mora wrote the script on a ship voyage from London to Melbourne in 1974. This was submitted to the Australian Film Development Corporation in early 1975 who agreed to support it.

The budget was raised from the Australian Film Commission (what the AFDC turned into), Greater Union and private investment, including Mora's father Georges, Margaret Carnegie, tycoon Victor Smorgon and Lyn Williams, the wife of artist Fred Williams. The AFC invested $175,000.

The movie was originally called just Mad Dog. Mora and producer Jeremy Thomas flew to Los Angeles to cast the lead role. Their first choice, Stacy Keach turned it down; Martin Sheen and Jason Miller expressed interest in playing Daniel Morgan but Mora decided to cast Dennis Hopper instead. The director recalled, "So we took this little plane down to New Mexico, in Taos, and we get out of the plane, and there's Dennis at the end of the runaway, dressed in tattered Levis, holding a rifle, just standing there and I remember thinking 'That's our Mad Dog!' (laughs)", Hopper's fee was $50,000.

David Gulpillil was cast off the back of his appearance in Walkabout.

=== Shooting ===
The film used various locations where Dan Morgan had been active, in the eastern Riverina, including Billabong Creek, Culcairn and Jindera; as well as locations in Beechworth, North East Victoria. Morgan's cave in the film was the actual cave Dan Morgan had used. Shooting started on 27 October 1975 and went for six weeks over 36 shooting days to 6 December. The shoot was challenged by rain during the first week but managed to be completed on schedule.

Mora recalled, "The completely different thing about it was the Australian character itself, which was gung-ho and go out and do it. We didn't really know what we were doing, so we just improvised. I mean, the catering on Mad Dog was just cooking a whole sheep. (laughs)"

Producer Jeremy Thomas later remembered his experience making the film:

We got Dennis Hopper somehow to be in it and I think there were something like 120 speaking parts and only $400,000 to make the film, which was very much in awe of Sam Peckinpah. We made a Western in Australia. And the film got selected for a side-bar event in Cannes; a film festival as usual came to my rescue. So I moved back to Europe having had the hands-on experience of making a film. The budget was made on a piece of paper, just page after page, and that is how the budget was constructed, never having made a film before, and a lot of the people who worked on the film were complete amateurs. I don't know how it was completed or done because we were very irresponsible, but I think it is a very good way to start with a colleague or friend.

Mora later wrote that he was "setting grotesque 19th-century human behaviour against an extraordinary landscape. I created Francis Bacon figures in a Sidney Nolan landscape, with stunts inspired by Jean Cocteau." The director says that Hopper was difficult during the making of the film, constantly imbibing drink and drugs. He noted "every drug dealer and hippie in Australia gravitated to Dennis. They're almost parachuting in to meet Dennis Hopper. (laughs)" However he says the actor could be very professional, a skilful improviser and gave a performance which was "really extraordinary. I think he identified with the role." Mora recalled Hopper at the finish of the shoot:

Rode off in costume, poured a bottle of O.P. rum into the real Morgan's grave in front of my mother Mirka Mora, drank one himself, got arrested and deported the next day, with a blood-alcohol reading that said he should have been clinically dead, according to the judge studying his alcohol tests.

Reflecting on the violence in the movie, Mora said "Vietnam was still fresh in our minds at that point. We'd been used to seeing incredible violence being broadcast into our living rooms when they'd show footage from the war." It was the first in a string of movies where Jack Thompson supported an American star.

Mora shot a scene where a young Ned Kelly looks at a waxwork of Morgan but decided not to use it.

The making of Mad Dog Morgan was featured in Mark Hartley's 2008 documentary Not Quite Hollywood: The Wild, Untold Story of Ozploitation!, in which Thomas, Mora and Hopper are interviewed.

It was the last film for actor Bob McDarra who died ten days after finishing his scenes on the movie.

== Release ==
The film had its world premiere at the Sydney Film Festival.

The film was screened at the Cannes market place in 1976 and distribution rights were sold to Cinema Shares for a reported $300,000 (although this deal later proved to be problematic with the producers having difficulty retrieving the money). "The response was just sensational," said Thomas.

The film was released in Australia in July 1976. The Sydney Morning Herald called it "maddeningly beautiful, horrific - and disappointing." The Bulletin declared "there are a couple of such spots in which Mora's vision merges on melodrama." According to Filmnews:

The reviews in Australia for Mora's film have been the most polarized yet. Inspired by a local production. Reviewers working for the Murdoch press have described the movie in such glowing terms as "masterful" and "a breakthrough". The Fairfax reviewers must have previewed a different film, so opposed to the production have their critiques generally been.

The movie was released in New York in September 1976. Australian media reported on poor reviews the film received in New York.

The film performed disappointingly at the box office, returning to the producers an estimated $100,000. Mora later wrote:

The finished film immediately polarised audiences in Australia. The nascent film bureaucrats of the day were shocked, even horrified, when they saw the film. It was mentioned to me that Max Fairchild raping Hopper in prison, with Bill Hunter leering, was not their idea of promoting tourism in Australia. My wisecracks that I thought this, in fact, would encourage tourism didn't help.

However, the movie sold well around the world – including a $300,000 sale to the US – and achieved good reviews.

Mora tried for several years to set up other films in Australia – including the movie that became Newsfront (1978), an adaptation of For the Term of His Natural Life and a science fiction story called The Black Hole – but was unsuccessful. He moved back overseas where executives at United Artists, who had been impressed by Mad Dog Morgan, hired Mora to direct The Beast Within.

== Awards ==
The film was nominated for Best Director, Best Supporting Actor and Best Music at the 1977 Australian Film Institute Awards. It won the John Ford Trophy at the First International Festival of Westerns held at Cannes in July 1976.

== To Shoot a Mad Dog ==
A 23-minute documentary was made about the making of the film, To Shoot a Mad Dog, directed by David Elfick.

== DVD Releases ==
=== Tromasterpiece Collection ===
Troma Entertainment's original VHS and DVD release was a heavily edited version of the film, seeing that the unrated or uncut versions were very difficult to come by outside of Australia.

With the intent of re-releasing the best films in the Troma library, The Tromasterpiece Collection released a 2-disc unrated version of the film in the US in November 2009.

Special features include interviews with director Philippe Mora, cinematographer Mike Molloy and associate producer Richard Brennan, along with a radio interview, deleted scenes, locations featurette, stills gallery and the original theatrical program.

Two graphic trailers were released for the DVD launch.

=== Director's Cut ===
Umbrella Entertainment (Australia) released a Director's Cut of the film on DVD in early 2009.

The DVD featured a fully restored print of the film, presented in an aspect ratio of 2:35:1.

The single disc included:

– They Shoot a Mad Dog: The Making of Mad Dog Morgan, a 23-minute documentary
– That's Our Mad Dog: Dennis Hopper interviewed by Philippe Mora - a new 30-minute documentary

Further extras included an audio commentary by director Philippe Mora; film excerpts; a radio interview; a stills gallery, a reprint of the film's original release theatre programme; and a .pdf file of the original shooting script.

=== Accolades ===
Award	Category	Subject	Result
Australian Film Institute Awards	Best Direction	Philippe Mora	Nominated
Australian Film Institute Awards	Best Supporting Actor	Bill Hunter	Nominated
Australian Film Institute Awards	Best Original Music Score	Patrick Flynn	Nominated

== Reception ==
The critic John Simon wrote about Mad Dog Morgan: "Whoever can find me a film more arrhythmic and incoherent – indeed inept – gets a reward in the shape of the ears of a wombat".

=== Copyright issues ===
The film's title screen copyright notice had an error with the Roman numerals, showing it as Copyright "MCMDXXVI" The "D" (500) should have been an "L" (50). Under American law this would have invalidated the Copyright entirely and placed the film in the public domain. However, as an Australian film, Australian copyright law does not require a specific production date be specified on the film, but rather, that information be available regarding the year of initial public screening.

== Notes ==
- Beilby, Peter (June–July 1976). "The filming of Mad Dog". Cinema Papers. p. 66-69.
