= Brookdale =

Brookdale is the name of many settlements, institutions, and businesses in English-speaking countries.

== Cities and towns ==
- Brookdale, California, an unincorporated town in Santa Cruz County
- Brookdale, Kansas
- Brookdale, Manitoba, an unincorporated town in the municipality of North Cypress, Canada
- Brookdale, New Jersey, an unincorporated community in Bloomfield, New Jersey
- Brookdale, South Carolina, a census-designated place in Orangeburg County
- Brookdale, Western Australia, a small suburb in the city of Armadale
- Brookdale, New South Wales, a rural locality in the Riverina region

== Other ==
- Brookdale Center, a defunct mall in Brooklyn Center, Minnesota
- Brookdale Community College, Lincroft, New Jersey
- Brookdale Park, New Jersey, a county park
- Brookdale Senior Living, a U.S. company that operates senior residences
- Brookdale University Hospital and Medical Center, Brooklyn, New York
