= Daniel Morgan (bushranger) =

Australian bushranger (1830–1865)

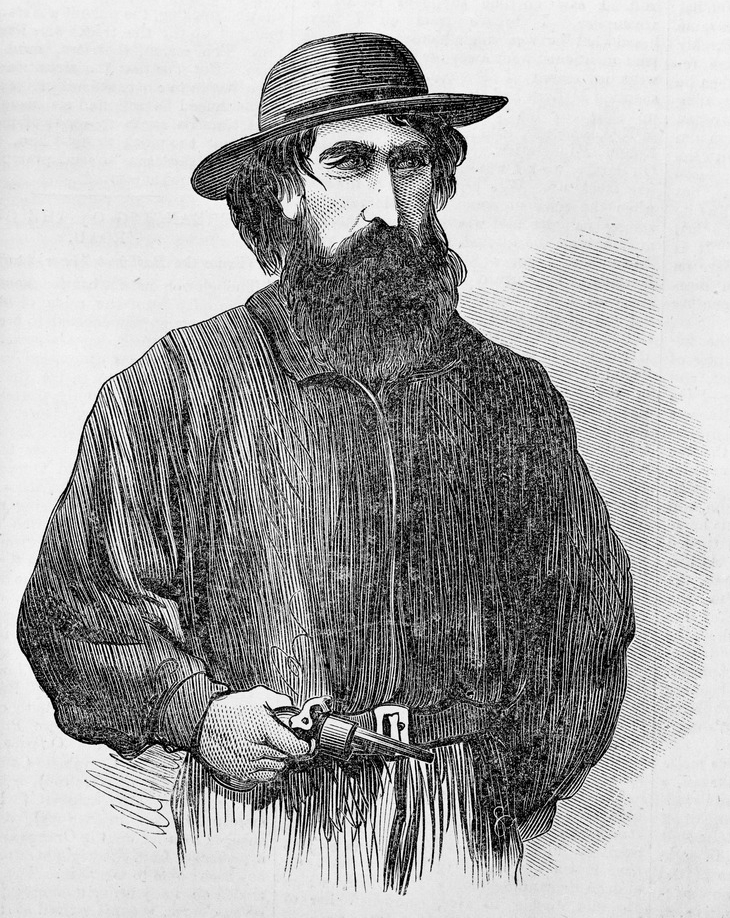
- Portrait of Morgan by Samuel Calvert, 1864
- Born: John Owen; 30 April 1830; Appin, New South Wales, Australia
- Died: 9 April 1865 (aged 34); Peechelba station, Victoria, Australia
- Occupation: Bushranger

John Owen (30 April 1830 – 9 April 1865), better known by his alias Daniel Morgan, was an Australian bushranger and outlaw. Active mainly in the Riverina of New South Wales and northern Victoria, he committed numerous raids and robberies and murdered at least four men, including two constables. He also shot several others.

Morgan was known by multiple aliases during his bushranging career, including Billy the Native, Warrigal and Down-the-River Jack. After Morgan wounded police magistrate Henry Baylis in a shootout in August 1863, the Government of New South Wales offered a reward for his capture. The amount increased to £1,000 as his crimes escalated, and he was officially declared an outlaw in March 1865. One month later, while holding up Peechelba station in Victoria, he was shot and killed by a stockman.

Many accounts of Morgan, particularly in the years after his death, depict him as bloodthirsty, erratic and insane, inspiring his posthumous sobriquet, Mad Dog Morgan. However, Morgan also had a network of sympathisers which, together with his expertise in bushcraft and horsemanship, helped him evade capture for two years.

Morgan's life and exploits have inspired works in the arts, including the 1976 Ozploitation film Mad Dog Morgan, starring Dennis Hopper in the title role, and the 2017 song "Billabong Valley" by psychedelic rock band King Gizzard & the Lizard Wizard.

== Early life ==
Daniel Morgan was born John Owen on 30 April 1830 in Appin, New South Wales. He was the illegitimate son of George Fuller, a local costermonger, and Mary Owen, a woman known locally as 'the Gypsy'. Other sources claim Morgan's father was an ex-convict called Samuel Moran. He was raised from an early age by a Campbelltown man called John Roberts, nicknamed 'Jack the Welshman'. Morgan attended a Catholic school at Campbelltown, but was considered a "n'er-do-well" with antisocial tendencies: "Society had little charm for him; bush and solitude were his delight".

== First conviction ==
In 1847, at age 17, Morgan found employment as a stockman on a station in the Murrumbidgee district. It was reputed that he "developed into a horse and cattle stealer, his practice being to drive his captures long distances, and sell them." By the early 1850s, he was known as 'Bill the Native' and was described as "a notorious horse thief" in the Avoca district, where he lived "a lonely life in the mallee scrub which then abounded there." Morgan had several run-ins with local squatters, and on one occasion was shot in the knee while being chased "for several miles by two settlers."

In June 1854, Morgan, under the alias 'John Smith', stuck up two travelling hawkers in the Castlemaine district in Victoria, leaving them tied to trees. Victoria police followed his tracks and captured him after "a desperate resistance". Morgan was sentenced to twelve years' hard labour and eventually confined in the prison ship Success, berthed at Williamstown. While working at a quarry near where Success was berthed, Morgan lost the top of one of his fingers in an accident.

On 27 March 1857, John Giles Price, the Inspector-General of penal establishments, was brutally murdered by a group of prisoners from Success. During an official visit at the quarry, a number of the prisoners overpowered Price and "dragged him down the side of the earthwork opposite the Bay, out of sight of the guard, felled him to the ground, and battered his head with large stones." Price later died of his injuries. Seven of the prisoners were convicted of Price's murder and were hanged for the crime. Morgan may have been considered to be amongst the group that had rushed at Price and was transferred to HM Prison Pentridge after the incident.

In June 1860, Morgan was granted a ticket-of-leave for the Yackandandah district, where he later claimed to have unsuccessfully tried to seek employment. Unable to find a job on account of his detention at Pentridge, Morgan turned to crime. After he failed to report to the authorities and was subsequently declared a fugitive, Morgan visited a pastoral run in the Murray district belonging to Dr. J. P. Rowe, who was absent, and stole a gold watch.

Morgan proceeded to Whitfield station and stole a horse, then stole a saddle and another horse from Demgamero (aka Bongamero) station. From there he went to Mount Typo station and "obtained shelter for the night" from the squatters there. The morning after, after the squatters had departed to round up stray cattle, Morgan helped himself to as many provisions and blankets he could carry. A group of men led by the squatters from Whitfield and Demgamero pursued Morgan and found him camped at the base of a steep range. Morgan managed to escape up the slope "where the pursuers were unable to follow with their horses", but was wounded in his upper left arm by a gunshot.

During the next few years, Morgan kept a relatively low profile in the eastern Riverina region, supposedly engaging in horse and cattle stealing and occasionally horse breaking.

== Bushranging activities ==
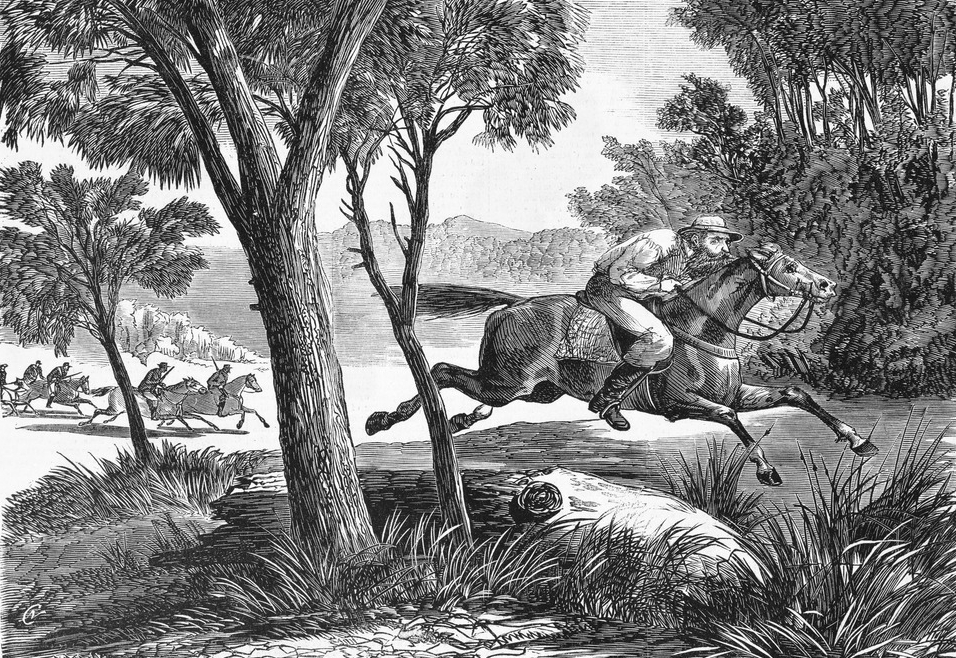
Morgan being chased, 1864

On 17 June 1863, Robert Morton, a squatter from Wagga Wagga, and Maurice Brach, a hawker from Beechworth, were camped at Walla Walla. Two robbers rode up to the camp, one of them armed with a double-barrelled gun and a revolver, and told them to bail up. The robbers took £30 worth of goods and money from Brach and four £1-notes and some nuggets from Morton. When Morton was asked whether he had any connection with Brach and he answered "no," the money and nuggets were returned to him. John Manson of Beechworth drove up at the scene, at which point the robbers stuck him up as well. One of the robbers was "supposed to be a man named Morgan, alias Beardie."

The following day, on 18 June, four young men were held up and robbed at Cookendina station, east of Henty. The robbers, one of whom fitted the description of Morgan, stole three racehorses, together with saddles and bridles, and 15 shillings in cash. Morgan is known to have been active with a companion (known variously as 'Flash Clarke' or 'German Bill') around this time.

On 29 July, Morgan and his companion arrived at Wallandool station, west of Henty, and stuck up two overseers, tying them to trees. They then proceeded to the homestead and accosted the squatter, a man named Gilbank. Morgan and his accomplice "then made a deliberate survey of the premises, and the result of their foray was that they rode clear off with two horses, saddle, and bridle, and other property which took their fancy, at the estimated loss to Mr. Gilbank of some £65." Even at that stage, Morgan's fatalistic attitude was evident; during the robbery he was reported to have said: "I expect I'll be shortly taken, so I may as well go the whole hog."

The description of Morgan given to police after the Wallandool robbery was as follows: "35 years of age, 6 feet high, long black hair curly at the ends, bushy beard and moustache, brownish color; rather knock-kneed, nose wrinkled, but not pockmarked; had on check trousers too short for him". Both Morgan and his accomplice "wore hairy coats; and rode fine grey horses; and carried carbines in buckets".

Morgan had been known by a bewildering variety of aliases during his life, including 'John Smith', 'Sydney Bill', 'Warrigal', 'Dan the Breaker', 'Down-the-River Jack', 'Beardie', 'Jack Morgan' and, most famously, 'Daniel Morgan'. By the time of his bushranging activities from mid-1863 the surname 'Morgan' was the identifier most often used in colonial newspapers.

=== Encounters with Baylis ===
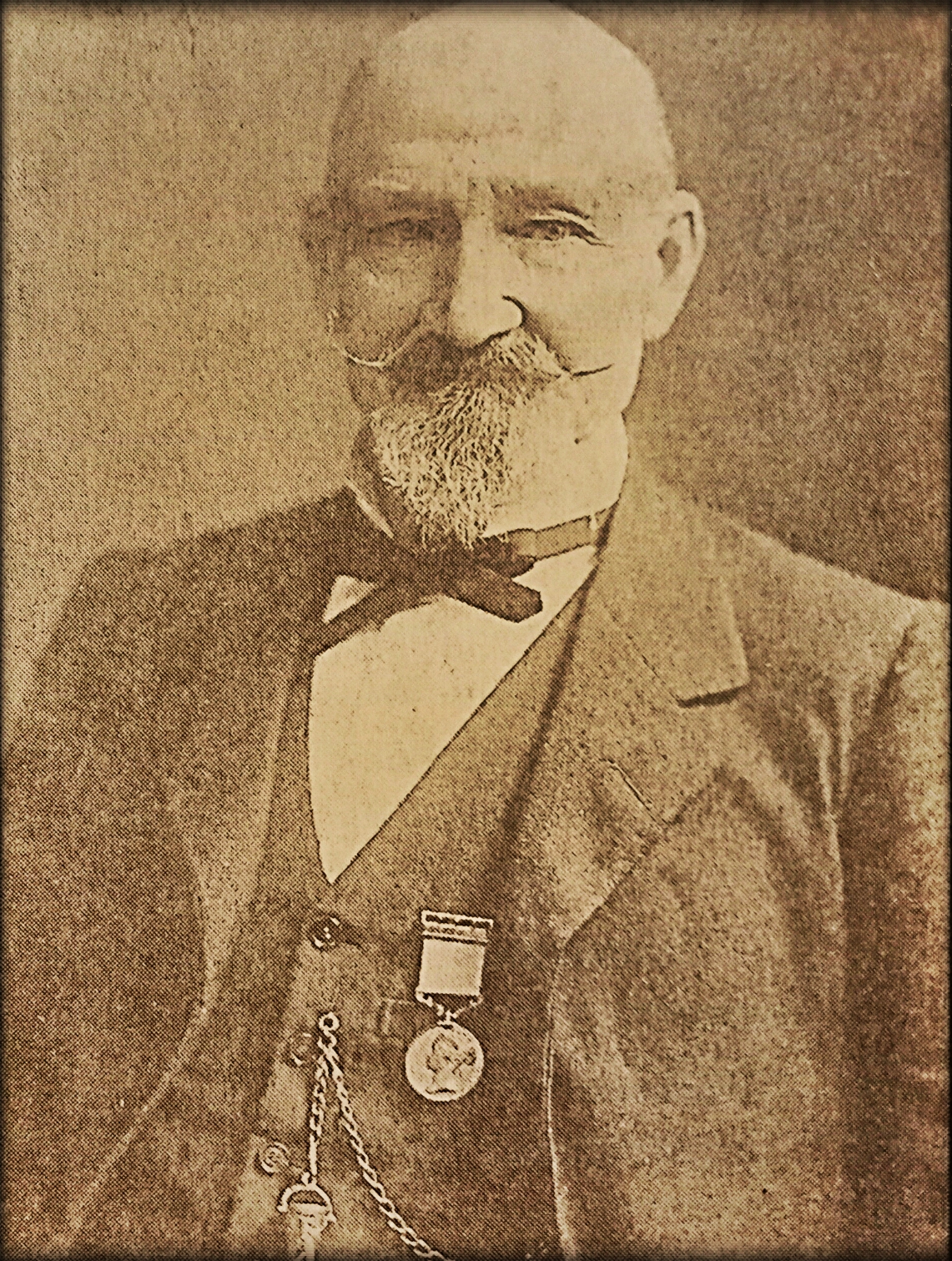
Henry Baylis, Police Magistrate at Wagga Wagga, wearing a watch-chain with the bullet that wounded him in the chest during a shootout with Morgan

On 20 August 1863 the Police Magistrate of Wagga Wagga, Henry Baylis, was travelling to Urana on official business when he was "stopped about midday by two rascals armed with double guns and revolvers, and ordered to surrender 'his money or his life'". Baylis responded by galloping away, but after a chase of several miles the bushrangers caught up with him. On discovering the identity of their captive Morgan returned the money and watch he had taken from him. Instead of tying Baylis to a tree the bushrangers opted to cut down a telegraph pole, cutting direct communication between Urana and Wagga Wagga. When he arrived at Urana Baylis telegraphed Wagga Wagga via Melbourne and the police there, headed by Sub-Inspector Morrow, set out and joined the Police Magistrate in Urana, after which Baylis and the policemen set off in pursuit of Morgan and his companion.

On the afternoon of 21 August 1863 a Mr. Scott was travelling with sheep near Bullenbung when he was held up by two men and robbed of £4 4s., a watch, a ring, and a new saddle. The watch and ring were afterwards returned. The robbers were identified was the same men who had carried out the 'Wallandool' robbery. On this occasion Morgan was identified as "Jack Morgan, alias Big Morgan".

On Wednesday, 26 August, the police contingent led by Henry Baylis discovered Morgan's camp in dense scrub about seven miles from Urangaline Creek. Sub-Inspector Morrow, Trooper Brown and Baylis remained at the camp to await the bushrangers' return. It appears that Morgan "had notice of the movements of the police" and after nightfall stalked the campsite "for the purpose of surprising the police". Towards midnight the police heard a noise in the scrub. Baylis went to investigate "but had not advanced three yards before a discharge of firearms took place in front, close to his person, and he fell instantly". Trooper Brown returned fire "in the direction of the flashes of the ruffians' guns" but the bushrangers escaped. Baylis had received a bullet through his right breast which exited from his left shoulder "leaving a fearful opening". The Police Magistrate eventually recovered, though he continued to suffer from the effects of the injury. The bullet that had passed through his body was later presented to Baylis "enclosed in a gold casket", which he wore suspended from his watch chain. In 1875 the colonial government presented Baylis with a gold medal for his "gallant and faithful service".

On the day following the wounding of Baylis a shepherd named Haley, in the employment of Henry Osborne at 'Brookong' station, was "fired upon and dangerously wounded by armed men". This incident was later included in a published list of crimes perpetrated by Daniel Morgan, in apparent retribution for the shepherd providing information to the police regarding the location of the bushrangers' camp.

The events of the night of 26 August did not go well for the bushrangers. 'Flash Clarke' had been severely wounded in the exchange of gunfire and Morgan had to assist him to escape. He took Clarke to an isolated location on 'Mahonga' station (south-east of Urana) where he died. A decomposed body was found on the run several years later, supposedly wearing the black coat Clarke had worn on the night of the shooting. As a result of the wounding of Henry Baylis the New South Wales Government offered a reward of £200 for "any person who shall give such information as will lead to the apprehension of the offender".

=== Bushranging alone ===
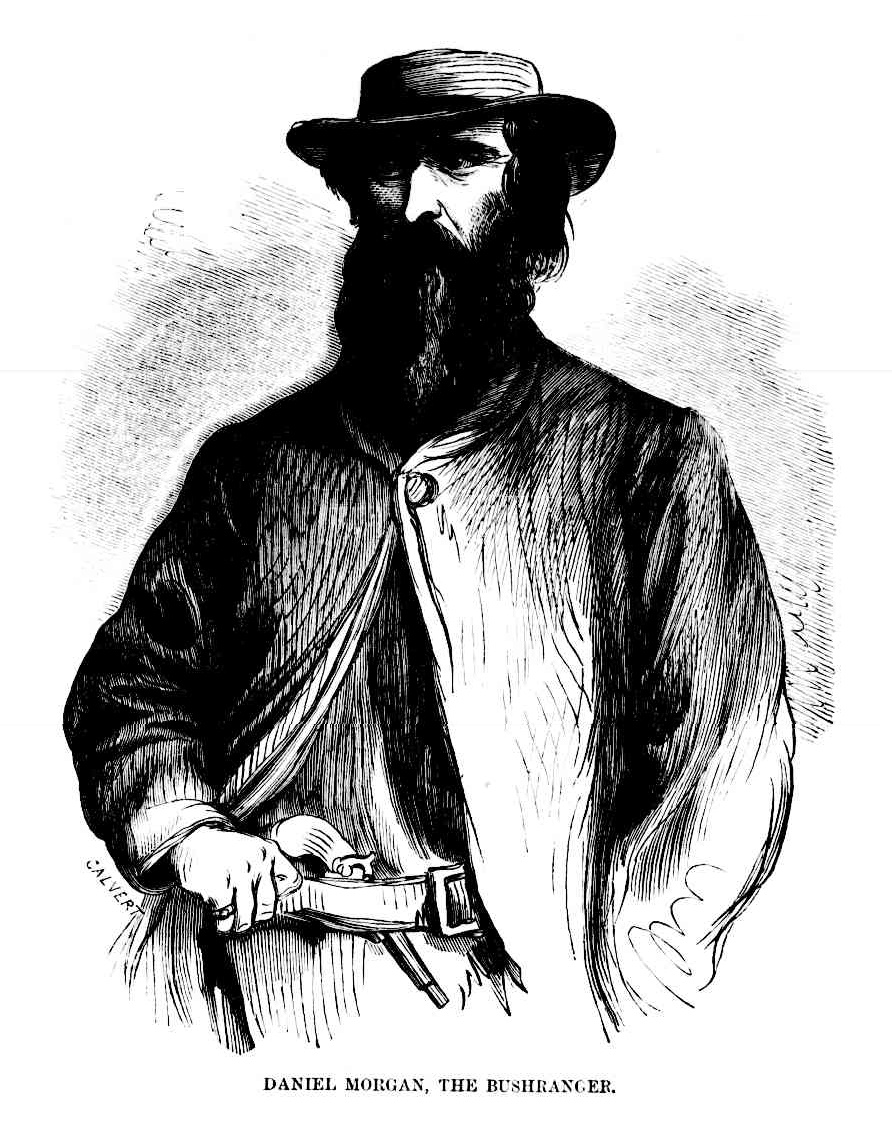
Portrait of Morgan by Samuel Calvert

On the morning of 3 November 1863 Daniel Morgan (now operating alone) arrived at Gibson's 'Burrumbuttock' station (34 miles north-west of Albury). The squatter, Thomas Gibson, was absent but Morgan made himself comfortable in the house by ordering breakfast and sending "one of the men to fetch up Mr. Gibson's favourite horse". Before leaving he changed his clothes, putting on one of Gibson's suits. Riding Gibson's horse he went to the public-house at Piney Range where he had drinks with some of the patrons before proceeding to the nearby 'Walbundrie' station where he stuck up Thomas Kidston and stole a chestnut horse called Euclid. Morgan then proceeded to the 'Bulgandra' station, another of Thomas Gibson's runs, where Gibson was supervising the shearing. After announcing that "he was now Mr. Gibson" Morgan ordered the shearers from the shed and "told the overseer, Smith, to prepare for death, as he would not see the morrow's sun". However, the overseer's wife pleaded with the bushranger, saying "if he killed her husband, he must kill her and the child too, and have three murders to account for". Her pleas were successful in saving her husband's life. Morgan then took Gibson into the house and made him sign nine cheques of £30 for each of the shearers, one of £95 for Morgan himself and another for £15 to pay a man to go to town and get them cashed. When the man returned with the money Morgan departed.

Early the following morning Daniel Morgan "called on" the Stitt brothers' 'Walla Walla' station "and helped himself to various articles which struck his fancy". While there he "compelled the proprietor to bring rum to the woolshed, and treated all the shearers". Morgan pointedly enquired about how the shearers were being treated, and instructed them "to acquaint him if they were ill-used, as he was always to be found thereabouts".

Two days later, on 6 November, Morgan visited Elizabeth Vincent's 'Mittagong' station (near The Rock) where he accosted Isaac Vincent (Elizabeth's son) and accused him of providing information to the police. Morgan instructed one of the shearers to tie Vincent to a fence post so he could "enjoy the spectacle of the place being burnt down". One of the men was then ordered to set fire to the woolshed. Morgan himself then set fire to the station store. While the store was burning he called to one of the men to get out a bag of flour "as he did not want to leave them starving". Morgan then rode away, commanding all at the station to remain in place till the following morning when he would return. Next morning "in accordance with his promise" he returned and "inspected them as a General of Division would". After eating breakfast at the station Morgan departed.

In January 1864 Thomas Henty's "Arab entire horse" was stolen in the night from 'Round Hill' station (east of Culcairn), a theft for which Morgan was suspected. Later the superintendent of the station, Ingram, met Daniel Morgan near Cookardinia. Morgan accused Ingram of "spreading a report" that he had stolen the Arab horse and "affected much virtuous indignation at the scandal". Morgan then stole Ingram's mount, after which he informed the superintendent where Henty's Arab horse could be found.

On 2 April 1864 Morgan stuck up the mail between Ten-mile Creek (Holbrook) and Tumbarumba and stole a horse from the mail contractor. Afterwards it was reported he was seen "enjoying himself" at Ten-mile Creek "without experiencing… hindrance from either police or civilians". Three days later Morgan and another man stuck up two men named Elliot and Donnelly 20 miles from Narrandera on the Jerilderie road. Morgan's companion (shorter in height with a "sandy complexion") carried a double-barrelled gun. The men were robbed of money, a horse and a saddle and bridle. The men did not report the crime when they arrived at Jerilderie and it was only later, after a routine police enquiry, that a report was made. The reason given by one of the men for the reluctance to report the incident was fear of retribution. This incident is the first time Morgan was reported with an accomplice since the death of his companion Clarke in August 1863.

On the morning of 12 April 1864 Morgan called at William Haines' 'Jerilderie' station (near Jerilderie township) and bailed up three men. Before departing that evening he exchanged his black mare for a grey mare belonging to Haines. A subsequent article in the Deniliquin Pastoral Times newspaper expressed disquiet at the delay in the provision of information about this incident to the police. It was thought the men involved feared retaliation by Morgan. The article concluded: "it is… clear that if this class of intimidated men is to increase largely, the capture of criminals will become indeed hopeless".

=== Murder ===
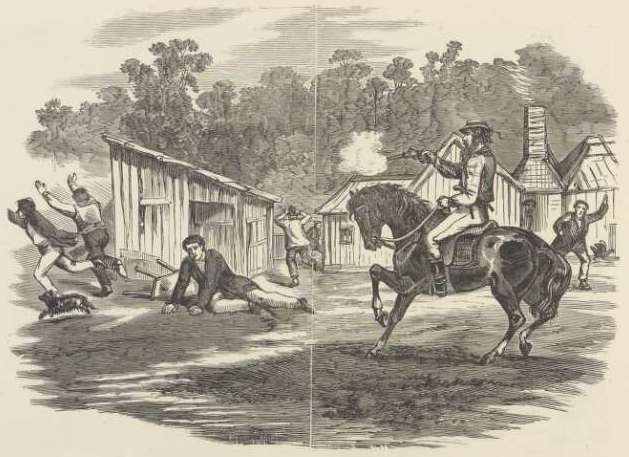
Morgan sticking up Round Hill Station

On 2 June 1864 D. F. Johnston and two other men, while droving stock to Melbourne, were camped on 'Round Hill' station when they were bailed up by Daniel Morgan. He robbed Johnston of money and a gold watch, and afterwards "selected a fine black mare, saddle and bridle" before making his departure.

On 19 June 1864 Morgan arrived at 'Round Hill' station, east of Culcairn. Those present at the homestead were the superintendent Samuel Watson and his wife, the overseer McNeil, the cattle overseer John McLean and the son of a neighbouring squatter, John Heriot. With "a revolver in each hand, cocked and capped" Morgan demanded that the liquor supplies, consisting of six bottles of gin, be produced. He insisted that his captives join him in drinking gin (to an extent that all involved were probably inebriated). After ordering a meal be served to him he rounded up the station personnel into a cattle shed.

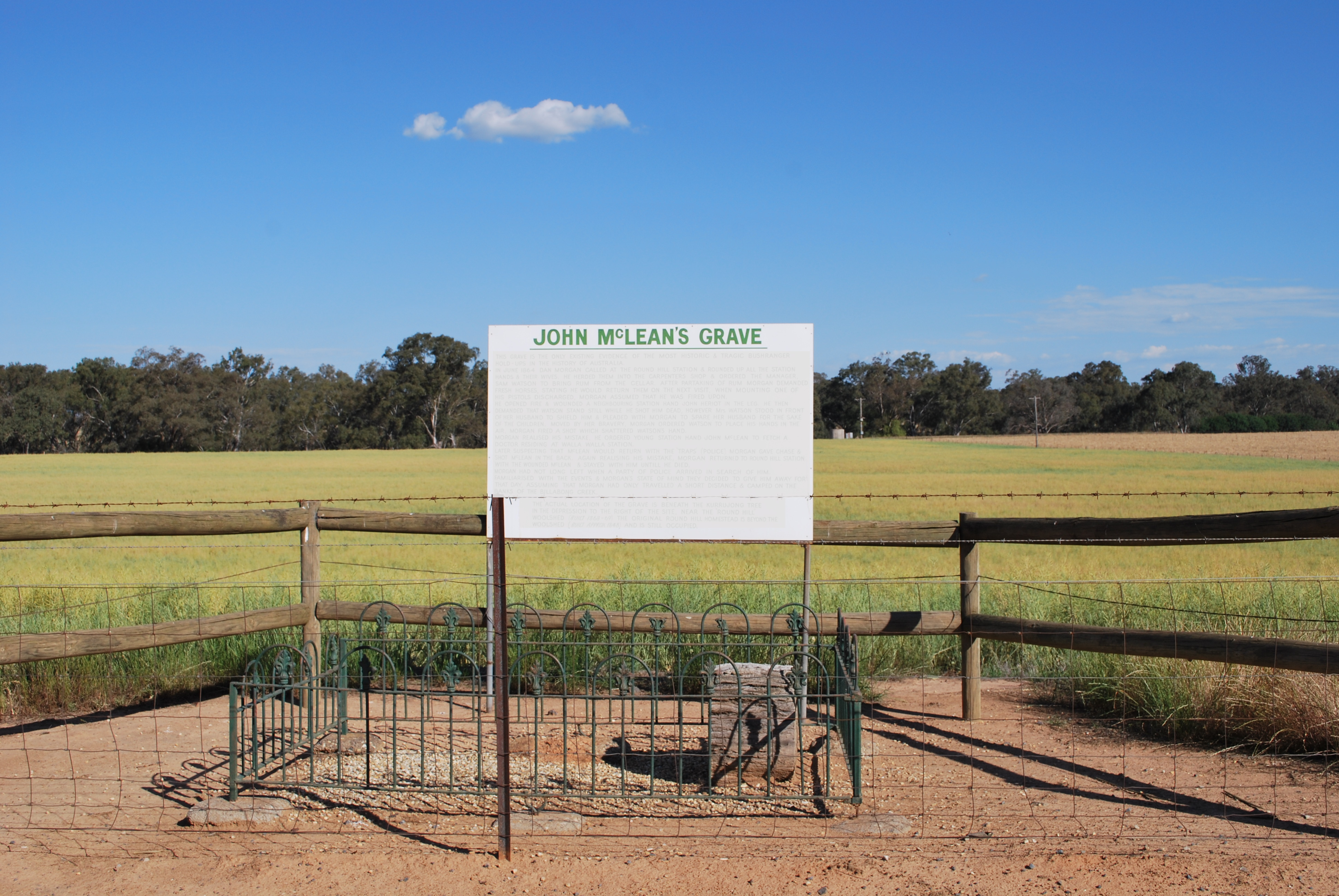
John McLean's 'grave' near Culcairn, commemorating the cattle overseer killed by Morgan in June 1864; McLean was actually buried at Albury so the 'grave' is more aptly described as a memorial.

After inspecting the station horses the bushranger mounted his horse to leave. At that point the superintendent Watson "rather rashly" made a comment that Morgan's stirrup irons had been stolen. Morgan "coolly turned round in his saddle, took deliberate aim at Mr. Watson's head, and fired". Watson put up his hand "through which the ball passed" and then grazed his scalp. Watson ran behind the shed and Morgan fired two more shots, one of which hit John Heriot's lower leg "shattering the bone in pieces". Suddenly taking pity on Heriot, the bushranger "who seemed to act with the inconsistency of drunkenness, or of a murderer gone mad… swore a fearful oath that he would blow the brains out of every man on the station if they did not come to Heriot's assistance". At this time two men made their appearance ("evidently 'Morgan's men'"), one of them described as "a half-caste aboriginal". Morgan supervised Heriot being made as comfortable as possible, at which point John McLean, "seeing Morgan apparently relenting, as if satiated with bloodshed", asked him "if he might go for a doctor". The bushranger answered "yes", but soon afterwards had second thoughts. He set out to follow McLean along the road, "overtook him five or six miles from the station, and without 'yea' or 'nay' coming close behind him" shot him in the back above the hip. Morgan dismounted and lifted the mortally wounded man onto his horse and led him back to the station. Morgan and his men "then remained carousing until two the next morning, when they departed as they came". The police under Superintendent McLerie arrived just five minutes after the bushrangers had left.

John McLean remained at 'Round Hill' where he died of his wound on 22 June. He was buried in the Albury cemetery.

=== Attacks against the police ===
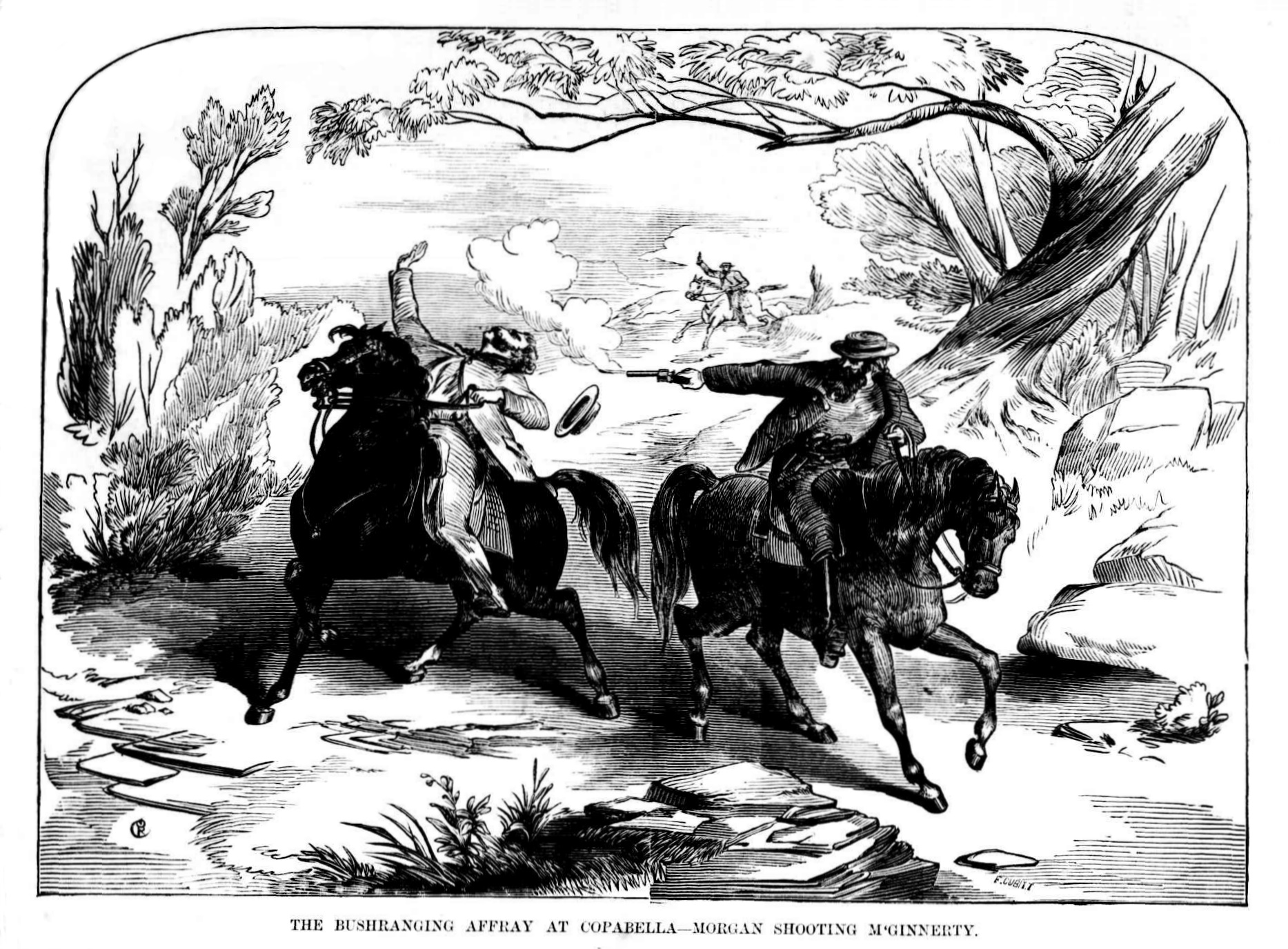
Morgan shooting M'Ginnerty

On 24 June Sergeant David Maginnity and Constable Charles Churchley encountered Morgan about fifteen miles east of Tumbarumba while they were returning from 'Coppabella' station on the old coach road. Seeing a man on a brown horse on the road ahead Maginnity had cantered forward to investigate. When the sergeant got closer Morgan "pulled his hand from his jacket and fired". Maginnity's horse was startled by the sound of the shot and rushed into the thick scrub beside the road. Morgan's horse wheeled off in the opposite direction as Constable Churchley fired two shots from his revolver. Churchley claimed to have searched the "thick scrubby country" for signs of Maginnity's whereabouts but, as his horse was "completely knocked up", he eventually led it back to 'Coppabella' so he could borrow a fresh horse. Churchley revisited the scene of the encounter, but lost the tracks of Maginnity's horse. On the road back to Tumbarumba Churchley encountered Morgan who "galloped across the road about twenty yards ahead"; the bushranger fired a shot which passed through the side of Churchley's coat. This encounter enabled Churchley to positively identify Morgan as the assailant. Near 'Glenroy' station Churchley saw Morgan a third time and fired at him, though the distance was too great to have any effect.

The next day Churchley and three young volunteers set off from Tumbarumba in search of Maginnity. That same morning the mailman had discovered Maginnity's body "a little off the road" about six miles from 'Coppabella' station. After meeting the mailman on the road, Churchley proceeded to the location. Maginnity's body was conveyed to Tumbarumba via 'Glenroy' station. A magisterial inquiry into the incident was held in the Tumbarumba court-house several days later, with the events leading to Maginnity's death based on the evidence of Constable Churchley's single eye-witness account.

Sergeant David Maginnity was about forty years of age and left a wife and four young children to mourn his loss. Based on his evidence at the magisterial inquiry questions have been raised about Constable Churchley's role in the affray, leading to accusations of cowardice on his part. Three months after Maginnity's death Churchley was found to be absent from his post at Ten-mile Creek after he had visited a local hotel while he was supposed to be on guard duty. He was suspended and convicted of neglect of duty and fined £5. The location where the police sergeant was killed is known locally as Maginnity's Gap.

As soon as the details of Sergeant Maginnity's death became known the New South Wales government offered a reward of one thousand pounds "for such information as will lead to… the apprehension of Daniel Morgan" who had been "charged with the commission of numerous and serious offences, and has hitherto eluded the efforts to apprehend him". The notification also detailed a reward of one hundred pounds "for such information as will lead to the conviction of any person or persons for harboring, assisting, or maintaining the above named offender".

On 3 July the policemen, Sergeant Carroll and constables Horrigan and Dalziel, were riding through part of Charles Edgehill's station (north-west of Henty) when in the distance they caught sight of a man galloping away from "an old hut" occupied by the Corcoran family. This aroused the suspicions of the police, knowing Morgan was likely to be in the district. The police gave chase and engaged in an extended pursuit through the bush on the adjoining 'Wallandool' station, during which Morgan's identity was confirmed. At one stage Carroll managed to fire his revolver at Morgan, but the bushranger eventually escaped. The woman at Corcoran's hut "alleged ignorance of Morgan", stating the man that the police had seen leaving "was a perfect stranger to them".

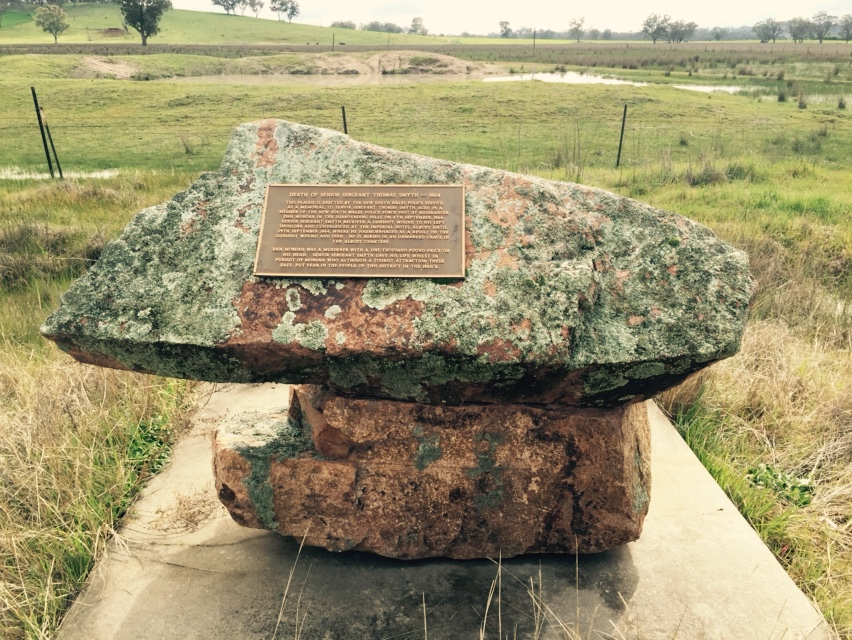
The memorial to Senior-sergeant Thomas Smyth, near Henty

On the night of 4 September 1864 four policemen from Albury, Senior-sergeant Thomas Smyth and three constables, were encamped at the swamp on Thomas Keighran's 'Doodle Coma' run near Henty. Their tent had an open front before which a fire had been made and at about nine o'clock the men were "lying and resting on the ground inside the tent". Suddenly a simultaneous volley of bullets was fired into the tent, "both from the opening and through the back". The policemen jumped to their feet and rushed outside. Smyth and Constable Connors returned fire into the darkness and the "firing continued on both sides". The others "made a skirmish" into the thick scrub but "without being able to come up to their cowardly assailants". On returning to the tent the men "found poor Smyth insensible and bleeding profusely" with a bullet wound to his left shoulder. Smyth was taken to the station homestead and next morning driven in a dog-cart towards Ten-mile Creek for medical assistance. After a dreadful trip during which the dog-cart driver lost his way in the bush Smyth arrived at Ten-mile Creek, after which he was transferred to Albury "by easy stages".

In Albury the wounded Senior-sergeant Smyth gave evidence that he believed "Morgan had ascertained that he was on his track, and that he and some of his gang… [had] crawled through the scrub up to the tent, and, having made a survey, fired into it simultaneously". Smyth thought there were at least three assailants. He said "all the firing occupied only a few moments" and "gives his companions credit for great courage and coolness". Despite Smyth's initial clarity of mind in the end his wound proved to be fatal. On three occasions "the wound had commenced bleeding afresh" and despite two doctors being "in constant attendance on him", Thomas Smyth died on 29 September. A memorial stone honouring Senior-sergeant Thomas Smyth, with an attached plaque provided by the NSW Police Service, is located two kilometres west of Henty (on the Pleasant Hills Road).

Five days after the attack on the policemen camped at 'Doodle Coma' Morgan had another narrow escape from the authorities. A group of four policemen sighted Morgan in the distance on "King's Run", adjoining Edgehill's station. Sub-Inspector Zouch, who had the freshest horse, chased Morgan towards the 'Doodle Coma' swamp during which the bushranger, being "hard pressed", threw his rifle into the scrub (which proved to be the rifle he had taken from Maginnity). Once again, however, Morgan eventually managed to escape.

=== Morgan's 'business' ===
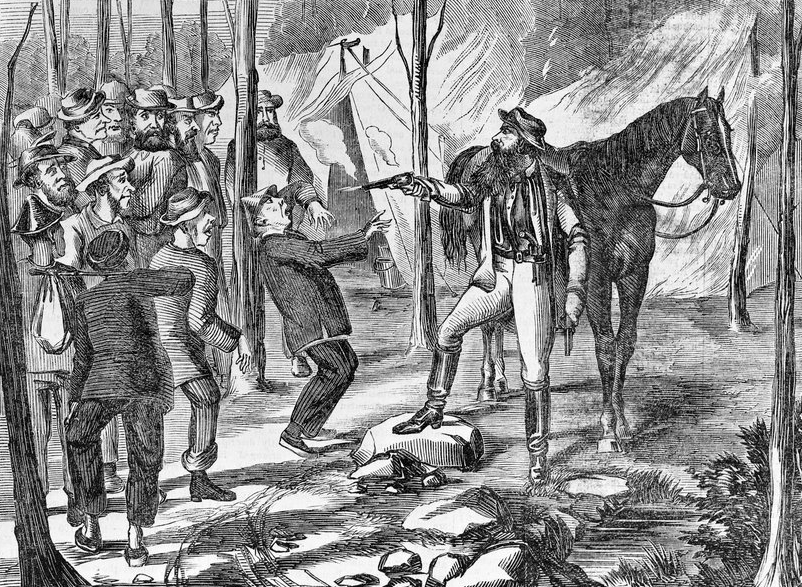
Morgan sticking up laborers, burning their tents, and shooting a Chinese man

In late October 1864 Morgan, in company with "two or three mates", stuck-up the 'Yarrabee' station (about 35 miles from Jerilderie). The occupants of the station were held hostage until the early hours of the following morning.

At about 3 o'clock in the morning on 23 November 1864 the Deniliquin mail coach was stopped at the Turangelina Scrub (about 43 miles from Wagga Wagga) by "Daniel Morgan and another offender", and robbed of the mail bags. The mailman attested that "Morgan opened most of the letters and then returned them". Two of the passengers were robbed of two horses.

On 11 December 1864 Morgan made an appearance at a road contractor's camp at Kyeamba (14 miles south-west of Tarcutta). He bailed up all the men at the camp, and when it was discovered the contractor Adams had no cash on hand, "he set fire to the tents". He ordered five Chinese men (described as "miners") to strip "with a view to searching their garments". When they hesitated, perhaps not understanding his command, Morgan shot one of them in the arm just below the shoulder joint. The money he recovered "was trifling" ("one small gold piece, and about thirty shillings in silver – the latter he threw away, from his chagrin"). He remained there until five in the afternoon "having caused tea to be made and a damper prepared for him". When Morgan left he took several hostages with him, taking them "over the mountains to eight miles north of Kyamba" (at a location known as Kyeamba Gap). There he held up two buggies, one belonging to Mr. Manson and his wife from Beechworth and the other driven by two young men. After robbing the occupants, he then "conversed freely for some hours, detailing his various exploits at great length, and dwelling particularly upon the murder of M'Ginnerty and Smyth, at which he made no attempt at concealment". He spoke of three men "whom he was determined to shoot before 'retiring from business'". The men named were "Mr. M'Kenzie, late of Mundarloo; Mr. M'Laurin, of Yarra Yarra; and Sergeant Carroll", each of whom "he expressed himself determined to revenge". After Manson and his wife were allowed to depart the mail coach to Albury arrived, but "being very light" Morgan "allowed it to pass after a merely formal examination". Shortly afterwards the mail coach coming from Albury arrived. Morgan ordered the driver to stop, but when this was not instantly complied with "he fired a shot at him to bring him to". He then made the driver "hold the horses heads, while he ransacked the mails".

Two days later two hawkers named Knight and Shane were stuck up by Morgan near 'Pulletop' station (west of Kyeamba) and robbed of £60 worth of liquor and gold nuggets, as well as a horse, a saddle and bridle. The hawkers had been well-armed and had "openly stated that they were not the least frightened of Morgan". However the bushranger had watched their campsite during the night and bailed them up in the morning as they unhobbled their horses. As he was leaving Morgan told them "he could have shot the two of them the night before and not to be so cocksure of their defense in future".

On 9 March 1865 a shepherd, John Pender, "was quietly feeding his dogs" on 'Wallandool' station (west of Henty) when "he received a shot in the thigh from Morgan's revolver". Pender crawled to his hut, followed by the bushranger. Morgan told him "he had mistaken the shepherd for some one else". Pender later gave evidence against Michael and James Corcoran who were charged "with aiding Morgan" in the murder of Senior-sergeant Smyth, as well as being involved in his own wounding. The Corcoran family had first come to the attention of the police when Morgan was spotted leaving their hut on Charles Edgehill's station near Henty in July 1864.

On 23 March 1865 Morgan stuck up the mail between Wagga Wagga and Urana. He ransacked the bags and stole a number of letters. A week later, at two o'clock in the morning on 30 March, Morgan stopped the mail coach from Albury on the road between Kyeamba and Tarcutta. He detained the coach for about two hours while he opened letters, but managed to find only a small amount of cash.

== Into Victoria ==
After the robbery of the Albury mail Morgan "was next observed about a week afterwards in the neighbourhood of Tumbarumba… and was then noticed to be making rapidly in the direction of the Murray" and thereafter he crossed into Victoria. Late in the afternoon of 2 April 1865 Morgan made an appearance at 'Tallangatta' station (about 24 miles south-east of Albury) from which many of the personnel were absent. The next morning two horses were found to be missing from the stables and it was supposed Morgan "must have visited the place during the night".

In late afternoon on 5 April Morgan arrived at McKinnon's 'Tawnga' station on the Little River, about 25 miles from Yackandandah, and stuck up 10 men, including McKinnon. When he departed he took a man from 'Tawnga' with him "to guide him across the country". Travelling at night Morgan next appeared at Roper's 'Mullindolingong' station, about 15 miles to the south-east, where "he compelled the services of another guide". From there Morgan travelled to the south-west until he reached the King Valley, south of Wangaratta.

By early morning (before daybreak) on 6 April Morgan arrived at the Evans brothers' 'Whitfield' station on the King River, about 25 miles south of Wangaratta. The bushranger ignited one of the haystacks near the house which roused the station inhabitants from their sleep. While they were gathered around in order to extinguish it, Morgan appeared from behind the kitchen, fired a gun and ordered them to "bail up". Morgan asked about the whereabouts of Evan Evans and was told he was away from home. Morgan explained "he particularly wished to see him and Mr. Bond, of Degamero station", both of whom had pursued him in September 1860 from which incident he received a wound in his upper left arm. Morgan "mentioned that New South Wales was getting too hot for him, and that the bloody detectives were walking about the country in the garb of pedlars". Before he departed at about 9 o'clock in the morning Morgan ordered a female servant to bring him two bottles of brandy. After he departed a lad was despatched to Wangaratta to inform the authorities.

The following morning the bushranger appeared on an adjoining run, the property of Mr. McBean, where, in separate incidents, he robbed a hawker and three draymen. At dusk Morgan arrived at the small township of Winton (between Benalla and Glenrowan, south-west of Wangaratta) where he was recognised as he rode past Whitty's public-house. During that night and the following Saturday morning (8 April) Morgan "was in possession" of the road between Benalla and Glenrowan; he "stopped nearly every one he met, riding up to where carriers were camped, and forcing them to disgorge".

=== Morgan's death ===
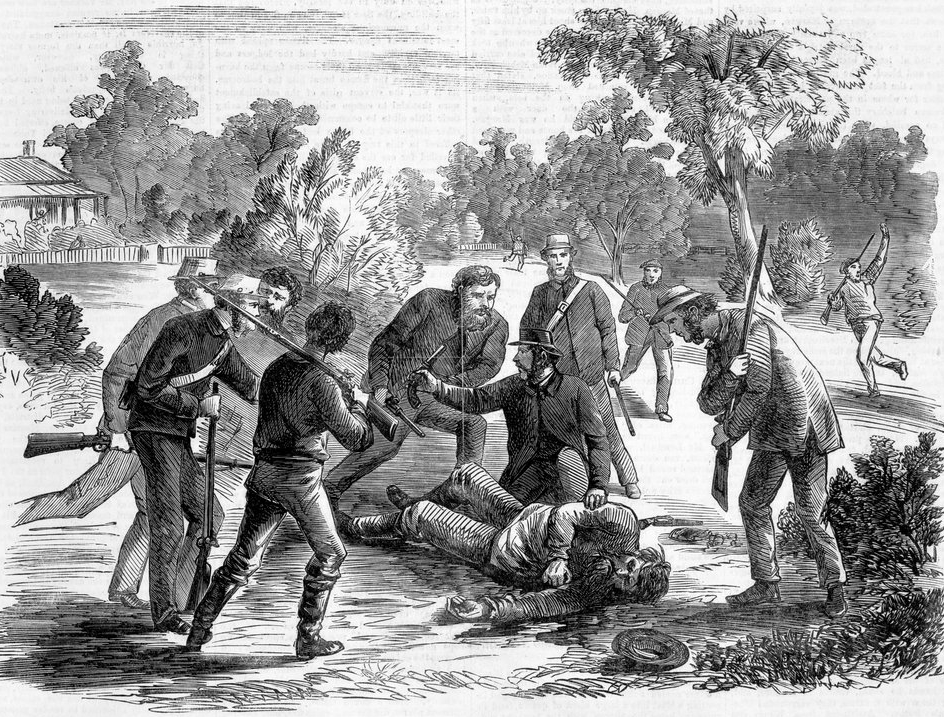
Capture and death of Morgan

After his depredations on the road between Benalla and Glenrowan on the morning of 8 April 1865 Morgan left the main road, cutting across the country to the north-west where he reached Warby's dairy station, after which he proceeded to the head station 'Taminick' (about 10 miles due west from Wangaratta). Mr. Warby was absent but Morgan was said to have behaved politely towards Mrs. Warby. On taking his leave at about noon he took a horse from the stables.

By evening Morgan had reached a road leading from a swamp past Rutherford and McPherson's 'Peechelba' station, with frontages on the Ovens and Murray rivers about 20 miles north-west of Wangaratta. Here he met Mr. Telford and two other men and compelled them to accompany him to the 'Peechelba' homestead. In the week or so since Daniel Morgan had entered Victoria he had travelled about 200 miles in a wide arc around the population centres of Albury, Beechworth and Wangaratta, and he was now within seven miles of the Murray River.

Morgan bailed up the co-owner of 'Peechelba' station Ewan MacPherson and confined him, his wife and household staff, as well as Telford and the other two men, in the parlour of the homestead. However, prior to being confined, one of the housemaids, Alice McDonald, managed to get a message to one of the station-hands "that a stranger was in the house". The man ran to George Rutherford's house, located a quarter of a mile from MacPherson's house. Rutherford was co-owner of 'Peechelba' and Morgan was possibly unaware of the other house on the station. Rutherford, not knowing that the 'stranger' was Morgan, was in two minds about how to proceed. Meanwhile, the household nurse, Alice Keenan, obtained permission to leave the parlour on the pretext of caring for a sick child. She ran over to Rutherford's house and informed him that the stranger was Daniel Morgan. On this news Rutherford despatched a man to Wangaratta requesting assistance. Inside MacPherson's parlour "things were proceeding very quietly" with Morgan "chatting familiarly with the inmates". Early in the evening he asked Miss Rutherford and Miss MacPherson to play the piano. Later Morgan dozed in a chair "with a revolver in one hand, and another on the table in front of him", though Ewan MacPherson perceived that the bushranger was not actually sleeping.

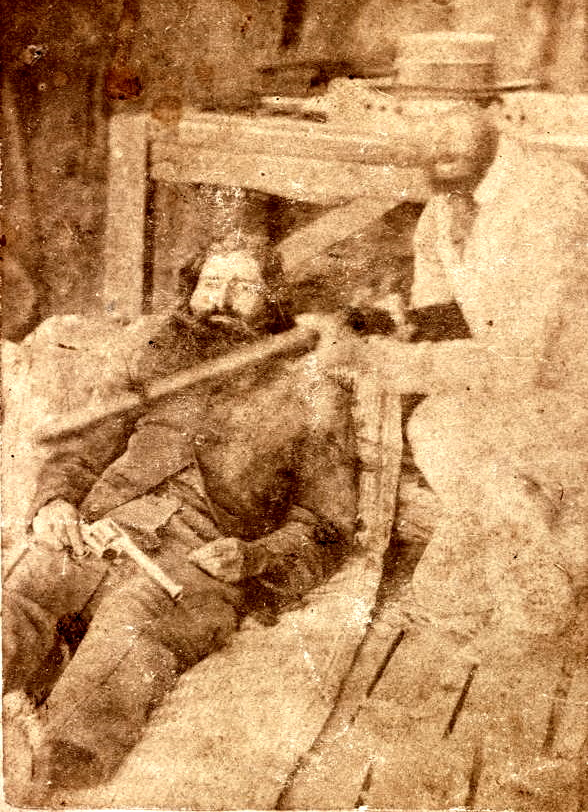
John Wendlan, the man who shot Morgan, beside the body of Morgan at 'Peechelba' station; photographed by Henry Pohl "on the spot".

On receiving Rutherford's message the Police Magistrate at Wangaratta gathered a group of townsmen to accompany constables Evans and Laverton to 'Peechelba' station, arriving at about two in the morning of Sunday, 9 April. In the meantime George Rutherford had collected together the trusted station-hands and armed them with any weapons that could be gathered. He gave the best guns to John Wendlan and a young man named McIntosh, who were considered to be the crack shots on the station. When the men arrived from Wangaratta it was decided to wait until Morgan made an appearance. The men were positioned behind the house and behind trees and fences in the vicinity.

In the morning Morgan went into a bedroom and "spent some time in dressing his beard and long hair, which he arranged in four curls". MacPherson remarked that "he seemed to bestow much care on it", to which Morgan answered "that a man must have something to be proud of". After eating breakfast Morgan told MacPherson he wished to borrow a horse. Fully armed, Morgan marched the men from the parlour onto the verandah and around the garden fence to the stockyard. When Morgan appeared the men waiting in ambush cautiously moved towards him. MacPherson became aware of the planned ambush when he saw men cautiously following. At the haystack where several horses were feeding MacPherson pointed out one of the animals to Morgan. While this was happening John Wendlan had moved up to the garden fence, a short distance ahead of the others. Without pausing Wendlan raised his gun and fired and the bushranger "fell with a heavy thud to the earth". Two constables then rushed towards the wounded bushranger and disarmed him, upon which Morgan "reproached them for firing without giving him a chance".

Wendlan had shot the bushranger in the back near his shoulder blade, the bullet "shattering the spine in its course [and] had made its exit by the throat". Gravely wounded, Morgan was taken to the woolshed. Detective William Mainwaring from Beechworth, who had arrived at 'Peechelba' during the night, interviewed the dying bushranger and offered him some wine. The District Coroner arrived from Wangaratta just after noon but decided that medical assistance would be ineffective. At one stage Morgan said his right hand was cold and at his request one of the men present in the woolshed rubbed it for him. Daniel Morgan died at about a quarter to two in the afternoon, aged 34 years.

=== Mutilation and burial ===
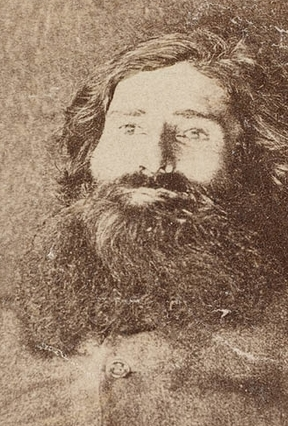
A post mortem photograph of Morgan

By the time of Morgan's death at 'Peechelba' in the early afternoon of 9 April a crowd of at least 50 onlookers had arrived at the station, most of them from Wangaratta. As soon as he died "several persons commenced cutting locks from his rather profuse head of hair", but Detective Mainwaring soon put a stop to this. While Morgan's body lay in the woolshed at 'Peechelba' his body was photographed by two photographers, Henry Pohl of Chiltern and Mr. Hall of Beechworth. Pohl's two photographs were posed as though Morgan was holding his revolver, one of them including John Wendlan holding a rifle alongside the body.

On the afternoon of the following day (Monday 10 April) an inquest regarding the death of Daniel Morgan was held at Wangaratta before a jury and the District Coroner, Dr. W. Dobbyn. During the inquest John Wendlan, who had shot Morgan, was asked by the District Coroner if he wished to say anything, but was cautioned that anything he did say might be used in evidence against him. The reason for the wariness was that, prior to the verdict of the inquest, Wendlan was technically liable to be prosecuted for the bushranger's murder. The following verdict was arrived at: "The deceased, whom we believe to be Daniel Morgan, met his death from a gunshot wound inflicted by John Wendlan, on 9 April 1865, at Pechelba station, on the Ovens River; and we further consider that the homicide was justifiable; we further consider that great praise is due to all concerned in the capture of the deceased".

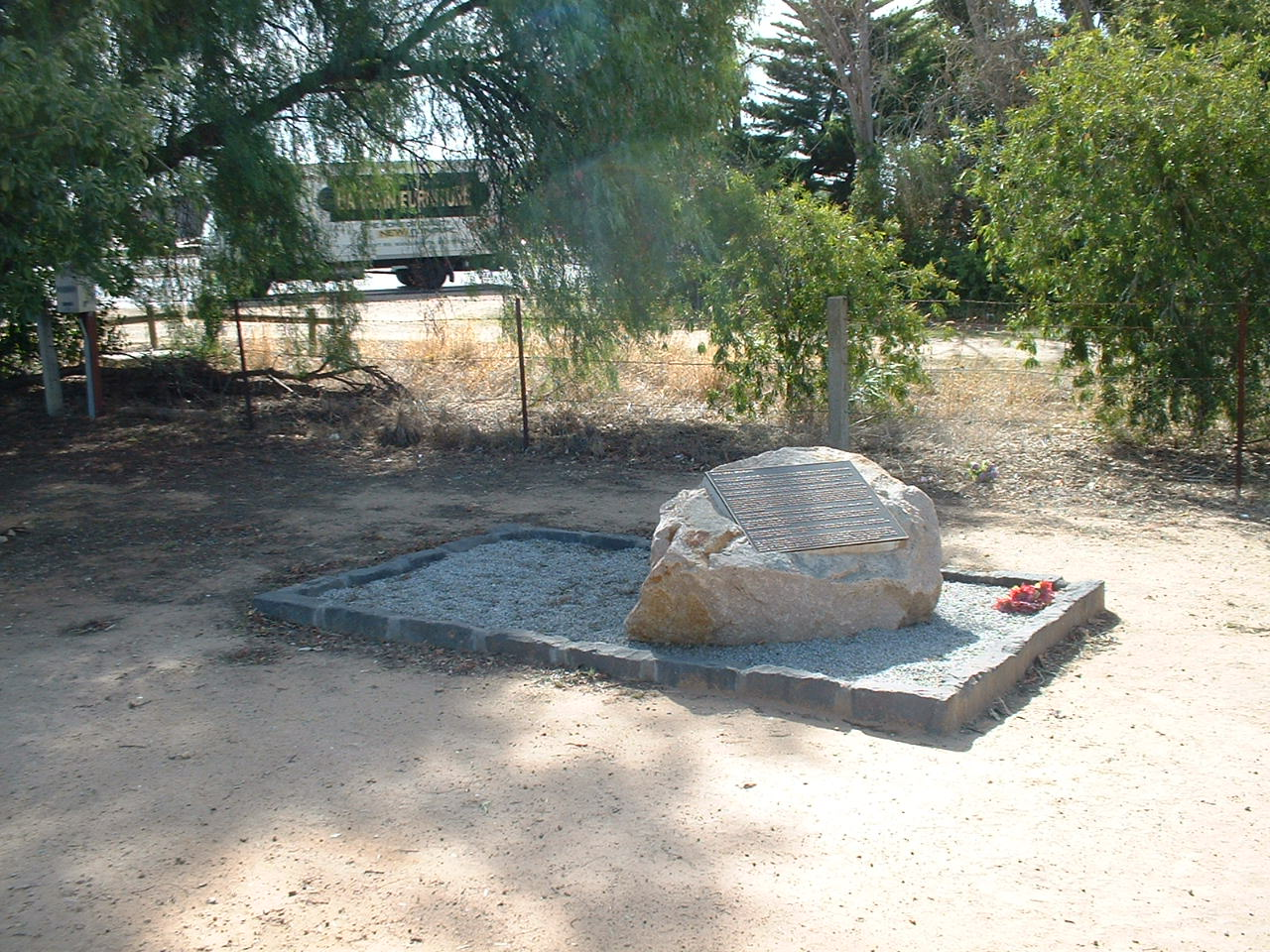
Morgan's grave in the cemetery at Wangaratta

The following day, 11 April, Morgan's body, wrapped in a wool-bale bag, was brought into Wangaratta and placed on public display in a police cell. Later that afternoon the body was removed to a shed where Dr. Henry of Benalla flayed the beard and underlying skin from the corpse's face using a clasp knife provided by Francis Cobham, Superintendent of Police at Benalla. Also present were Dr. Dobbyn, the District Coroner, and Dr. Mackay of Tarawingee. Dr. Henry then severed Morgan's head from his trunk. The remaining hair was then shaved from the head, it was washed in hot water and a plaster cast made. In May 1865 it was reported that the Attorney General of Victoria had suspended both Dr. Dobbyn ("for removing the head of Morgan") and Superintendent Cobham ("for the part he took in reference to the beard"), however both suspensions were only temporary. A later report states the skin and beard from Morgan's face was made into a tobacco pouch.

On 14 April Morgan's head was put in a box and sent to Melbourne by coach where it was handed over to Professor Halford of the Melbourne University for scientific study. After receiving the head Halford stated that "he had expressed no wish that the remains of the wretched man should be so recklessly mangled, and that decomposition had set in to so great an extent that for any scientific purposes the head is quite useless". The newspaper report added that "the decapitation appears to have been a most unwarranted piece of officiousness and excess of authority on the part of the local Coroner, and is very much akin to the prurient and brutal feeling which resulted in the hair, beard, and clothes of the deceased marauder being hawked about for the delectation of the curious".

Daniel Morgan's headless body was placed in a pine coffin and buried in the Wangaratta cemetery. Morgan was denied a Christian burial; his remains were interred in the Chinese section of the cemetery. A description of his grave published in 1878 noted that a rose-bush and geranium were growing at the head of the grave, planted by Morgan's mother who, up until 1876, had travelled from New South Wales once every year to visit the grave.

== Aftermath ==
In early May 1865 a man named Thomas Maslen was brought before the Wahgunyah Police Court on a charge of using threatening language towards John Wendlan, widely known by then as the man who shot Morgan. Maslen, who had been drinking in the Union Hotel at Wahgunyah, was reported to be threatening to shoot Wendlan. A police constable proceeded to the hotel and searched Maslen's swag, finding a double-barrelled gun, as well as powder and caps. In one of Maslen's pockets a small bottle of strychnine was also found. Maslen was from the Corowa district in New South Wales and it was reported he was "a mate of Morgan's". However the police failed to produce evidence of an association with the bushranger and the case was eventually dismissed. After his dismissal a correspondent from Corowa reported details of a conversation with Maslen in which the writer questioned Maslen's sanity.

The New South Wales government reward of £1000 "for the capture of the offender Morgan" was shared between 17 different people. The main recipients were John Wendlan (the man who shot the outlaw) who received £300, Alice McDonald (the housemaid who first conveyed the information about Morgan) £250, James Frazer (a volunteer who assisted soon after the shooting) £250, Donald Clarke (a volunteer stationed near the house with Wendlan) £100 and Alice Keenan (the nursemaid who informed Rutherford of Morgan's identity) £50. What remained of the reward money was evenly split between 12 other volunteers and policemen who were involved in the confrontation at 'Peechelba' station.

In May and June 1865 notices were published, addressed to "the squatters of Riverina and Victoria", calling for subscriptions towards a fund "for the benefit of John Wandlan (sic), who shot Morgan the bushranger". A statement by Ewan McPherson of 'Peechelba' station explained that Wendlan had left the station at the recommendation of the police who were concerned of "the danger he was in of Morgan's friends avenging his death". Wendlan had been employed at 'Peechelba' for four years prior to Morgan's shooting.

During April 1865 the New South Wales government passed legislation which was designed to facilitate the capture or killing of bushrangers and to punish those who assist, harbour or provide sustenance to them. The legislation, called the Felons' Apprehension Act, was specifically aimed at notorious bushrangers such as Daniel Morgan and Ben Hall and effectively gave the public license to shoot and kill such declared outlaws on sight without calling on them to surrender or requiring the commission of an offence. As it happened, Morgan was killed in Victoria at the time the legislation was passing through the New South Wales Parliament. However, the section of the Act dealing with those who would give shelter or sustenance to a declared outlaw had a deterrent and possibly salutary effect on Morgan's previous associates and sympathisers (even though technically the act would not apply to them). In June 1865 Inspector Singleton from Albury stated that "about thirty persons, suspected of harbouring Morgan and other similar characters, have left their accustomed haunts and taken to honest pursuits since the Felons' Apprehension Act became law".

== The epithet 'Mad Dog' ==
During his lifetime the bushranger Daniel Morgan was described in many different ways in the colonial press, but 'mad dog' was not one of them. The nearest association of the term with Morgan (slight though it is) was in an editorial in the Adelaide newspaper South Australian Register, written in April 1865 on the news of Morgan's death. The article compares Morgan, who "seemed to commit murder because he enjoyed it", with other bushrangers such as Gilbert, Hall and Dunn who "only took life when driven to extremities, at which times they appear to have no more compunction in shooting a man than they would have in putting a bullet into a mad dog".

As far as can be determined the epithet 'Mad Dog' was first applied to the bushranger in Philippe Mora's 1976 movie Mad Dog Morgan. A search for references to the phrase "Mad Dog Morgan" in the digitalised Australian newspapers on the Trove online database finds the earliest reference was in August 1975 in an article announcing that Dennis Hopper would be starring in a film "about the Australian bushranger Dan 'Mad Dog' Morgan".

== Cultural influence ==
The films Dan Morgan (1911) and Mad Dog Morgan (1976) are based on his life and death. Morgan also appeared as a character in the short lived television series Wild Boys, played by Colin Friels

Morgan appears as a character in the play Humping the Bluey, or Ransom (1911). His life is fictionalised in Will Dyson's historical novel Red Morgan Rides (1940), and it is likely he was the inspiration for the villainous bushranger "Dan Moran" in Rolf Boldrewood's novel Robbery Under Arms, first published in serial form in 1882. Two biographies have been written about Morgan: Margaret Carnegie's Morgan: The Bold Bushranger (1974), and Edgar F. Penzig's Morgan the Murderer (1989).

He was dramatised in the radio series Outlawry Under the Gums (1933).

Banjo Paterson wrote the words of "Waltzing Matilda", Australia's most famous folk song, to a tune played on the zither by the grown Christina Macpherson (who was the infant in the 1865 incident above).

Morgan – with his "Mad Dog" sobriquet – is referenced in the song "Billabong Valley" by Australian psychedelic rock group King Gizzard & the Lizard Wizard, released on their 2017 album, Flying Microtonal Banana.

In the 2019 film True history of the Kelly gang Morgan's corpse appears strung up to a tree in a brief scene.

== See also ==
- List of serial killers by country
