= Brookdale, New South Wales =

Brookdale
- Town
- Coordinates: 35°07′S 147°00′E
- Country: Australia
- State: New South Wales
- LGA: Wagga Wagga
- Location: 491 km (305 mi) from Sydney; 35 km (22 mi) from Wagga; 34 km (21 mi) from Galore; 23 km (14 mi) from Milbrulong

Government
  - State electorate: Wagga Wagga
  - Federal division: Riverina

Population
  - Total: 50 (SAL 2021)
- Postcode: 2650
- County: Mitchell

Brookdale is a rural locality in the central east part of the Riverina. It is about 8 kilometres, by road, north-west of Bullenbung and 34 kilometres south-east of Galore.
