= Henry Baylis =

Australian police magistrate (1826–1905)

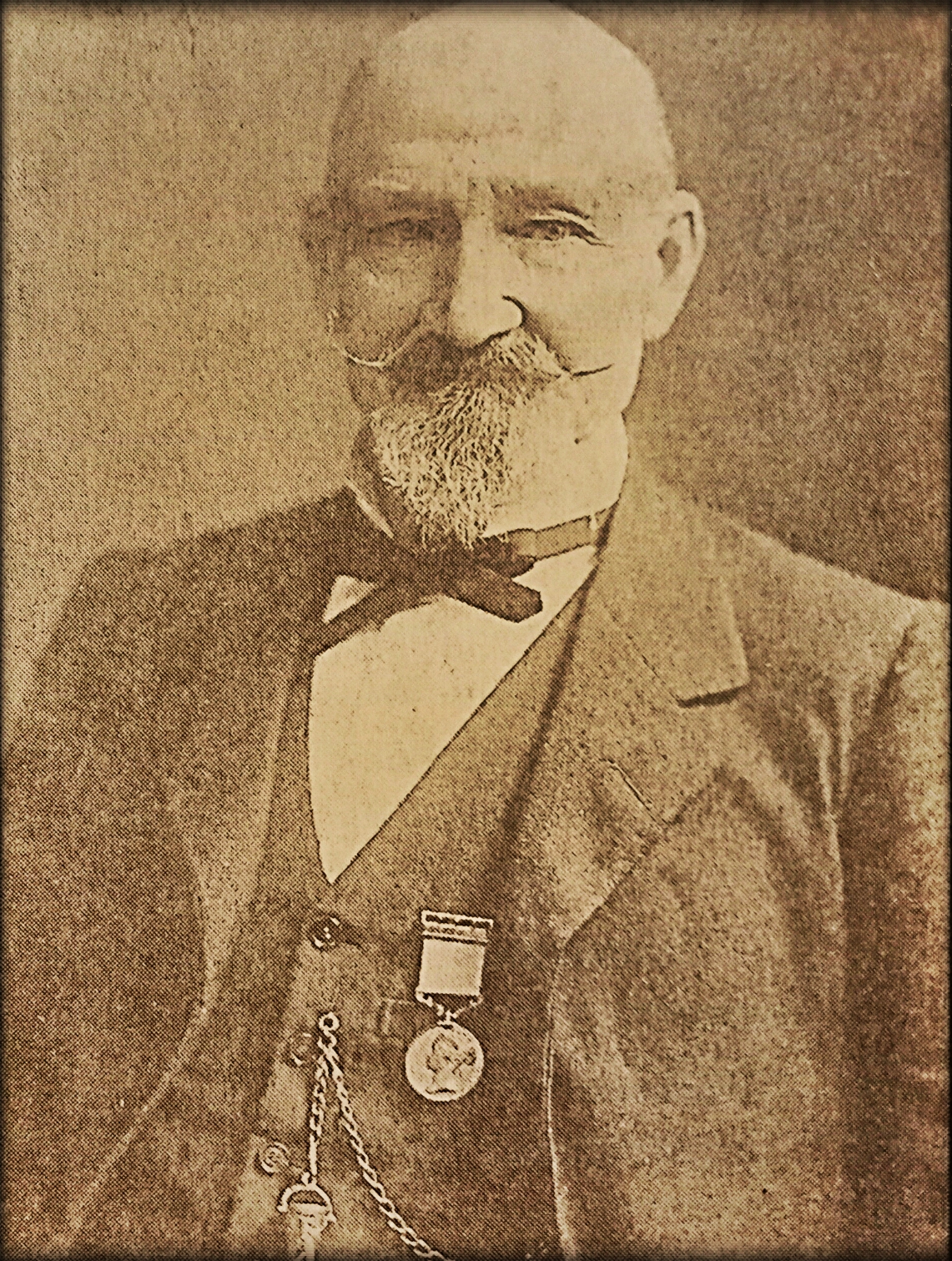
- Henry Baylis, 1898
- Born: 17 April 1826; Edinburgh, Scotland
- Died: 5 July 1905 (aged 79); Homebush, New South Wales, Australia
- Burial place: Rookwood Cemetery
- Occupation: Police magistrate
- Years active: 1858–1896
- Spouse: Sybella Murray (1832–1891)
- Children: 8 sons and 1 daughter
- Parents: Thomas Henry Baylis (father); Julia Dorothea Bartels (mother)

Henry Baylis (17 April 1826 – 5 July 1905) was an Australian police officer and the first police magistrate of the Wagga Wagga district in New South Wales. He served in that position for almost forty years and helped with the development and improvement of the settlements in the district. The main road in the city of Wagga Wagga, Baylis Street, is named for him.

== Early life ==
Henry Baylis was the second son and third child of Thomas Henry Baylis and Julia Dorothea (née Bartels). His father, Thomas, was a lieutenant in the 17th (Leicestershire) Regiment of Foot, and stationed at Edinburgh castle at the time of Henry's birth on 17 April 1826.

In 1830, the 17th (Leicestershire) Regiment of Foot was to replace the British Army garrisons in the Australian colonies. Thomas travelled with his wife and seven children on the convict transport ship City of Edinburgh, where he was appointed officer of the guards. The ship departed from Cork on 18 March 1832 and arrived in Sydney on 27 June.

Henry Baylis completed his schooling at The King's School, Parramatta, before spending four years in training in the legal office of the Fitzhardinge family in Sydney. In 1849–1850 Baylis worked for a pastoral company in Bathurst, which drove 300 horses 1,200 km (750 mi) overland from Wallerawang in New South Wales to Adelaide in South Australia. After gold was discovered in the Mudgee district in 1851, Baylis tried his luck as a gold prospector.

== Police magistrate ==
On 9 August 1852, Baylis became clerk of Petty Sessions at Hartley. On 1 January 1858, Baylis was appointed by the Premier Charles Cowper to be police magistrate in the district of Wagga Wagga. Baylis' role as magistrate was to take charge of the district's police force, issue hawking and liquor licences, preside over enquires of suspicious deaths and to lead the bench in the Court of Petty Sessions.

As a government-appointed official, local residents approached him with issues they believed the government should help them with; such as when on 2 December 1858, he wrote to the commissioners of the National Board of Education for help in establishing a National School in Wagga Wagga. On 21 June 1859, Baylis laid the foundation stone of St John's Church of England. On 31 March 1869, Baylis called a public meeting at the urging of local residents, where it was decided to petition the governor to declare Wagga Wagga a municipal borough under the 1867 Municipalities Act. This would enable Wagga Wagga to establish a local government. The main road in Wagga Wagga, has been named Baylis Street, after Henry Baylis.

=== Encounter with Dan Morgan ===
As the police magistrate in the area, Baylis made monthly visits to the settlements of Urana and Narrandera to hold court sessions. On 20 August 1863, Baylis was making one such trip to Urana, when he was "stopped about midday by two rascals armed with double guns and revolvers, and ordered to surrender 'his money or his life'", these two men were later identified as bushrangers, Dan Morgan and his associate "Flash Clarke". Baylis responded by galloping away, but after a chase of several miles, the men caught up with him. On discovering the identity of their captive, Morgan returned the money and watch he had taken from him. Morgan and his associate then cut down a telegraph pole, cutting direct communication from Urana to Wagga Wagga. Once Baylis arrived in Urana, he telegraphed Wagga Wagga via Melbourne, and the police set out to join him in Urana before heading off in pursuit of the bushrangers.

On 26 August, Baylis and the police contingent found the bushrangers' campsite and lay in wait for the bushrangers' return. Around midnight the police heard a noise outside, Baylis went to investigate, and fire was immediately exchanged. In the resulting shootout, Baylis and Clarke were both wounded. It is believed that Clarke succumbed to his wound, as Morgan was thereafter seen to be working alone, and the remains of a man following Clarke's description were found some years later. Baylis was struck in the thumb by a bullet, which then glanced along his arm before entering the right breast under his collarbone, passing along his back, before exiting under his left shoulder blade.

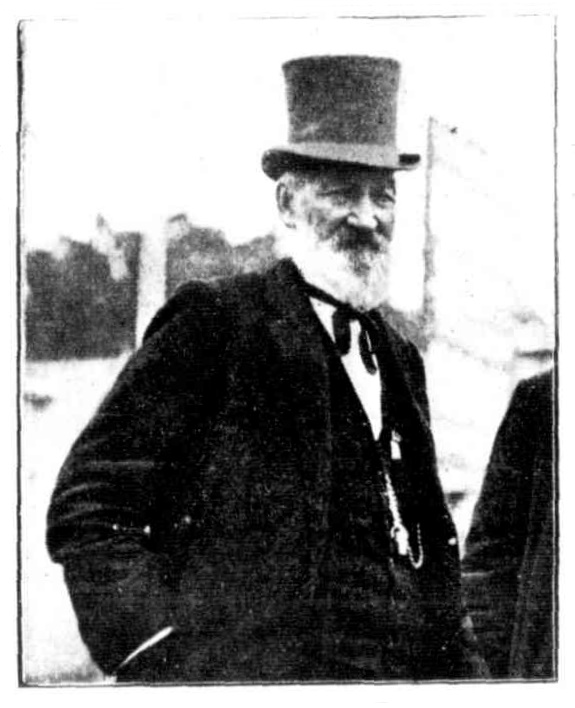
Henry Baylis, c. 1905; published in the Sydney Mail and New South Wales Advertiser, 12 July 1905

For his efforts in helping to track down the bushranger Dan Morgan, Baylis was awarded a gold medal. The bullet was presented to Baylis by his brother magistrates upon his retirement from the bench. It was enclosed in a gold casket, which Henry Baylis wore suspended from his watch chain as a good-luck charm.

=== Brookong Disturbance ===
In August 1888, a dispute arose between William Halliday, a member of the Pastoralists Union, and the Amalgamated Shearers' Union. Halliday was employing non-union shearers at his Brookong Station, about 80 km (50 mi) from Wagga Wagga. Union shearers arrived and abducted the non-union shearers. Halliday called in the police to help with the disturbance. On 17 August, Baylis arrived and read the Riot Act. Nine men were arrested for their involvement in the dispute; they stood trial at the 19 October sitting of Supreme Court in Wagga Wagga.

== Later life ==
After 38 years as the police magistrate in Wagga Wagga, Baylis retired to Homebush in July 1896. On 5 July 1905, Baylis died after being hit by a train at Homebush station. He was predeceased by his wife Sybella (née Murray), whom he had married on 29 January 1857. He was buried at Rookwood Cemetery in Sydney.
