= Bullenbung =

- Town
- Coordinates: 35°10′S 146°56′E
- Country: Australia
- State: New South Wales
- LGA: City of Wagga Wagga
- Location: 501 km (311 mi) from Sydney; 48 km (30 mi) from Wagga Wagga; 21 km (13 mi) from Lockhart; 19 km (12 mi) from Collingullie

Government
  - State electorate: Wagga Wagga
- Postcode: 2650
- County: Mitchell

Bullenbung is a rural locality in the central east part of the Riverina. By road it is about 19 kilometres north east of Lockhart and 21 kilometres south east of Collingullie.

Bullenbung Post Office, shown in Post Office history as Bullenbong, opened on 1 November 1888 and closed in 1903.
