= Jane Harris (Neighbours) =

Fictional character from Neighbours

- Neighbours character
- Portrayed by: Annie Jones
- Duration: 1986–1989, 2005, 2018–2025
- First appearance: 30 July 1986
- Last appearance: 11 December 2025
- Created by: Ray Kolle
- Introduced by: Reg Watson (1986); Ric Pellizerri (2005); Jason Herbison (2018)
In-universe information
- Occupation: Student; Secretary; Model; Acting principal; Principal
- Father: Peter Harris
- Mother: Amanda Harris
- Husband: Victor Stone (divorced)
- Sons: Byron Stone
- Daughters: Nicolette Stone
- Granddaughters: Isla Tanaka-Brennan
- Grandfathers: Len Mangel
- Grandmothers: Nell Mangel
- Uncles: Joe Mangel
- First cousins: Toby Mangel; Sky Mangel

Jane Harris (also Stone) is a fictional character from the Australian soap opera Neighbours, played by Annie Jones. She was created by writer Ray Kolle and debuted during the episode broadcast on 30 July 1986. Jones originally auditioned for the role of Charlene Mitchell (Kylie Minogue), but she was not successful. This prompted Jones to telephone the producers for two months asking for a role in the show until eventually she was cast. In 1989, Jones decided to quit the serial in order to pursue other projects and the character departed on 9 September the same year. In 2005, Jones was one of many former cast members who agreed to return to the serial to mark the 20th anniversary of Neighbours. On-screen she was featured making a cameo in Annalise Hartman's (Kimberley Davies) documentary about Ramsay Street. Jones reprised the role again in 2018 for two guest stints starting on 6 April and 26 November 2018. She returned on 10 February 2020 as part of the serial's 35th anniversary celebrations, before returning to the regular cast from 8 July 2020. Her final appearance aired on 28 July 2022 in the Neighbours finale. She reprised the role as part of the series' continuation, via Amazon Freevee, on 18 September 2023 until the final episode on 11 December 2025.

During her early episodes she held the nickname "Plain Jane Superbrain", for her intelligent, yet geeky image, which she was referred to by other characters and media alike. She is portrayed as a mousy type character, going on a journey of self-discovery as she transformed into a heartbreaker. Her most notable point in this storyline is her makeover in which she wears make-up in place of her glasses and dresses attractively in order to win Mike Young's (Guy Pearce) heart. Her makeover has been well-documented by critics and holds a place in popular culture, where she is often referred to in cases of extreme makeovers. However, some academic publications have criticised her makeover for conforming to the stereotype that females cannot be sexy and intelligent at the same time. Following her return for a guest stint in 2018, Jane has a brief relationship with Paul Robinson (Stefan Dennis). A storyline involving Jane in a mother-daughter conflict later unfolds through the introduction of her daughter Nicolette Stone (Charlotte Chimes). In the finale episode, the character's love life plays a major part as she reunites with Mike. This continues through the revival and their subsequent breakup allows for Jane's love life to be explored further. She has a brief reunion with her newly introduced ex-husband Victor Stone (Craig Hall), and is later involved in a secret fling with a younger man, Clint Hendry (Jason Wilder). Jones also received the Logie Award for Most Popular Actress in 1989 while portraying Jane.

== Casting ==
The creation of Jane developed a different way to the usual process and there were no regular audition sessions. Aspiring actress Annie Jones spent two months ringing the Neighbours production company asking for a role on the show. She said "I had appeared on several other Australian TV shows, but desperately wanted to get into Neighbours". Jones originally auditioned for the role of Charlene Mitchell, before she was given the small role, for what was a planned six weeks of appearances. Jones was 19 when she landed the role and became a permanent cast member. She made her first appearance on 30 July 1986.

== Development ==
=== Characterisation ===
Jane was originally portrayed as being dowdy, lonely and quiet. She was a bookworm and mousey, thus generating her nickname "Plain Jane Superbrain" to which she was often referred at the beginning of her role. Jones describes her character as a "goody-goody". Her clothing style was forced upon her by her mother, who believed she should be dressed in "dowdy" clothing. Jane is very clever and was bullied because of this whilst at school. When she meets Charlene Mitchell (Kylie Minogue), she begins to transform into a different person. With Charlene's help, she began to dress differently and as she became more confident. Describing Jane's style, Jones said "Once the character came out of her shell she got to wear the pretty clothes. I just remember lots of big hair, enormous shoulder pads and huge plastic earrings. It was the 80s and that was the height of fashion. We looked hot!" Jane began drawing the attention of male characters, most notably Mike Young (Guy Pearce) and she was eventually seen as a "heart-breaker". Jane's grandmother Nell Mangel (Vivean Gray) does not approve of her change in personality, but Jane ignores her worries and becomes a model. Following her make over, she becomes more assertive and takes the initiative to end her relationship with Mike Young. She then begins an affair with an older man.

=== Relationships ===
In 1987, producers cast actress Briony Behets to play Jane's mother Amanda Harris to explore her backstory. She arrives in Erinsborough to reconnect with her daughter after two years. She had abandoned her to start a new life in Hong Kong. She was billed as a "glamorous but ageing socialite". But Amanda notices that Jane has become attractive and the "scheming" character decides to try and compete against her to get more attention. Behets soon left the show as Amanda was only intended to be a guest character.

The producers devised a romance storyline for the character alongside Mike Young. Jane's grandmother is not happy with the prospect of Jane and Mike forming a relationship. Jane decides not to pursue their relationship any further. Pearce told Patrice Fidgeon from TV Week that his character mainly shared a "platonic" relationship with Jane. But writers introduced a temporary love interest for Jane, pilot Glen Matheson (Richard Moss) who is much older than her. Nell disapproves of her new boyfriend because of the age difference. But Jane decides to end the romance, Pearce explained that "she realises this was not going to work out and calls it quits." This wins Nell's support of Jane's involvement with Mike who is of a similar age. The pair had not been on good terms prior to working together on a photography assignment. They spend the day with Charlene and Scott Robinson (Jason Donovan) but after they leave the pair spend time alone and resolve their past problems. Pearce added that his character had been trying to charm Jane for some time. Eventually "she gives in" to Mike, Pearce believed that she felt sorry for Mike but over time comes to the realisation that she "really likes him".

It was reported in June 1988 that Jones had signed a new contract to appear as Jane for another twelve months. But Jane and Mike's relationship would not last as writers decided to pair her with another established character, Des Clarke (Paul Keane). Their relationship is formed when Des decides to help Mike set up a photography dark room for a birthday gift. Jane offers to help but nearly electrocutes herself but Des manages to rescue her. Jane believes Des has saved her life and they develop a connection. Jones told TV Week's Lawrie Masterson that "it builds towards a full on affair. Jane becomes virtually a stand-in mother for little Jamie (Des' son) and all those maternal instincts that girls have start to emerge. This results in the final break-down of her relationship with Mike, Jones added "Mike gets the flick basically."

Mike is hurt when new love interest Bronwyn Davies (Rachel Friend) chooses to be with Henry Ramsay (Craig McLachlan). He incorrectly believes he and Jane have a chance of reconciling because when Jane and Des share a meal to discuss Mike, but Jane believed Des had invited her with romantic intentions in mind. Des does feel drawn to Jane and Jones told Darren Devlyn from the magazine that her character is "really upset" when Des wants to discuss Mike. Jane is nearly hit by a car and this makes Des realise that he is in love with Jane and asks her to marry him. Mike is left feeling worse that both women in his life have chosen other men. Jones told Devlyn that Des' friends still believe he is attached to the memory of his late wife Daphne Clarke (Elaine Smith). She explained that because of Daphne "it's natural that the proposal comes as a big shock." Both characters had been left emotionally damaged from previous relationships but Jones believed the duo had no hesitations once they made the commitment. The actress added "it's great that Des is finally over his mourning." She was also looking forward to her character taking the role of step-mother to Jamie. It was interesting for her to see how Jane copes with the responsibility of looking after a child. Keane was happy with the storyline because he believed it was time for Des to move on. He was also excited to work more closely alongside Jones on the storyline.

=== Departure and cameo appearance ===
In 1989, Jones decided to quit the serial in order to pursue other projects. Jones' contract had been up for renewal but she chose not to proceed. Jones told Chrissie Camp (TV Week) that three years on a soap opera was long enough and the right time to leave. Jones filmed her final scenes with Neighbours in July that year. Camp revealed that Jane's exit storyline would see her receiving bad news about Nell's health and performing a "mercy dash overseas", though her fiancé Des pleads with her not to leave. She leaves regardless of Des' request and their wedding plans are put on hold. Camp added that Jane's departure comes as a "total shock" to the other residents of Ramsay Street. Jane departed during the episode broadcast on 4 September 1989.

In 2005, it was confirmed that Jones had reprised her role to join the many ex-cast members returning for the show's 20th anniversary episode "Friends for Twenty Years".

=== Returns ===
On 18 February 2018, it was announced Jones had reprised the role, and she returned from 6 April 2018. Of her return to Neighbours, Jones stated "I was absolutely thrilled to be asked to return to Neighbours. As an actor, the best thing you can be is a working actor. I've done a lot of guest roles but usually very short-lived, so this has been lovely to come back for an extended period and really get my teeth into a part." Jones later explained that she approached the show's producers about a return and pitched several plot ideas.

Jane returns to Erinsborough to deal with some "unfinished business" and attempts to "rectify the past." Digital Spy's Daniel Kilkelly speculated that this meant she would meet with Paul Robinson (Stefan Dennis), who is the only regular character around that has some history with Jane. Series producer Jason Herbison said Jones had an "interesting take" on what Jane's life would be like today, which the production team included in her storyline. Herbison added that Jane's return would be "a very fascinating character journey." Jones added that as Jane has been living with Mrs Mangel in London for nearly thirty years, she has adopted some of the older woman's "views and attitudes". Jane leaves Erinsborough during the episode broadcast on 2 May, after learning her grandmother has died. She returned on 26 November 2018, and a writer for Soap World speculated that she would be coming back "to tie up some unfinished romantic business with Paul Robinson!" Jane departed on 16 January 2019.

The character returned on 10 February 2020, as part of the serial's 35th anniversary celebrations. Jane comes back to Erinsborough seemingly happier and brighter than before, but she breaks down when her online date, Richard, fails to meet with her. Her friend Dipi Rebecchi (Sharon Johal) suspects that Richard may be a con artist, but Jane refuses to accept that idea. She later takes a job at the high school as she needs money.

=== Reintroduction and daughter ===
On 27 June 2020, it was announced that Jones had reprised the role as a permanent cast member. Producers also cast Charlotte Chimes to play Jane's estranged daughter Nicolette Stone. Writers decided to explore Jane's off-screen life that occurred during Jones' time away from the show. Nicolette lost contact with Jane after her decision to come out as lesbian. Of her return, Jones stated "Jane is returning to her old neighbourhood and bringing with her an insight into what her life away from Ramsay Street has been like for the past 30 years. Audiences will learn more about her family, as fans are introduced to her daughter Nicolette for the first time." The character's return scenes aired on 8 July, as Jane encounters Karl Kennedy (Alan Fletcher) holidaying in Perth and reveals that her relationship with Des has ended.

In February 2023, Jane's return as series regular was announced as part of the series' resumption. Jones described her decision to return as a "no-brainer", adding that "I love having the opportunity to grow as an actor with every storyline and new episode". She also commented on the possibility of Jane's reunion with Mike being undone in the new episodes, describing the situation as "tough" but expressing hope that Jane "has a lot more new adventures coming her way".

=== Introduction of Victor Stone ===
In 2024, writers developed a storyline to introduce Jane's ex-husband and the father of Nicolette and Byron Stone (Xavier Molyneux), Victor Stone (Craig Hall). Producers had originally planned to introduce Victor in 2022, with him arriving in town to tempt Jane away from her then partner Clive Gibbons (Geoff Paine), however the storyline was scrapped after the show was cancelled. A promotional trailer released on Neighbours social media accounts previewed Victor's arrival, and showed that Jane was annoyed by his presence. It is eventually found that he comes to town to see his family as a has cancer and is dying, which makes Jane sympathetic. Writers continued to develop a story which sees Victor attempt to build a friendship with Jane again, but she is hesitant due to his unfaithful history and absence during their marriage. She eventually begins to forgive him and they begin spending time together again and get back on "civil terms'', which worries Jane's stepdaughter Sam Young (Henrietta Graham). Jane begins to get cautious that Victor could be trying to win her back, and "she knows she wants to stay loyal to Mike" (her current fiancé). He continues to attempt to spend time with his family, and organises a bush walk for them, however Jane "refuses to be part" of the activity, but later feels guilty and goes to find them. The show began with spoilers revealing that he will receive "surprising news'', that his cancer is in remission and he is no longer dying. He subsequently leaves Erinsborough, and leaves Jane an explanation letter.

Several months later, Daniel Kilkelly from Digital Spy reported that Victor would return as Jane's friend Melanie Pearson's (Lucinda Cowden) online date. Spoiler photos show him at Jane's house and Kilkelly writes that his "unannounced return" with throw Jane and their kids "in turmoil". He goes on to write that she will "step up to protect her children", as she is angry with him after his previous sudden exit without even saying goodbye. However, advanced spoilers reveal that she will begin falling for her ex-husband again, still not knowing about his romantic connection to Melanie. It was revealed that Jane would "spontaneously kiss Victor" which leaves him "stunned", and the pair's "loose ends tie" and they get back together. Writers develop a love triangle storyline between Jane, Victor and Melanie, who still has feelings for Victor despite him dumping her. Spoilers reveal that Jane will "receive a shock" as she "discovers Melanie's romantic link to Victor". The reunited couple walk on "shaky ground" with Melanie around. Jane begins to worry about their newly rekindled relationship when he becomes excited about potentially buying a pub in Gippsland that Melanie suggested. Jane goes with him to see the pub on a "romantic day" as they "soak up the country ambiance" and "share their vision of the future". Kilkelly writes that she will not "share in his [Victor's] excitement in owning a pub", but will "support the decision to put in an offer".

Victor reveals his connection to Melanie when she congratulates him on putting in the offer. This leaves Jane to ask him if "he's sure he doesn't have feeling for Melanie". Kilkelly also states that Byron "questions his mother about getting back with Vic" and "points out the fact that she accidently called him Mike", which indicates she "may have her own issue". Jane subsequently ends their relationship and tells Melanie that if she still wants Victor, she should "pursue it". Victor prepares to leave Erinsborough for Gippsland and enjoys a "surprise family brunch" with Jane, Byron and Nicolette.

=== Relationship with Clint Hendry ===
In late 2024, Neighbours released a trailer on their official social media accounts for 2025, which previews Jane signing up to an online dating app, and matching with a younger man Clint Hendry (Jason Wilder). Daniel Kilkelly from Digital Spy writes that she will "start seeing a younger man in the new year", and goes on to say that this "concerns" her son Byron, who questions how legit this new man is. Advanced spoilers from Digital Spy reveal that Jane starts "feeling positive" about "enjoying conversations with one guy in particular". It adds that Jane will ask to meet with Clint and will be "taken aback" when she sees that "he is considerably younger" than her. Further spoilers reveal that she and Clint will begin "bonding over shared interests", however Jane decides she can't date someone so young and leaves. It also reveals that Clint will ask Jane to "consider another date", but Byron becomes suspicious, which encourages Jane to ask Clint for a second date. However, this doesn't last long, as spoilers reveal that Clint will take up a job at Erinsborough High School, not knowing Jane is the principal, and she is "determined not to have a relationship with an employee". Further spoilers reveal that Jane remains "just as into him as he is to her", but remains "in denial" about still having feelings, before finally "giving in to temptation", and having sex in an empty room.

Spoilers continue saying that Jane will "struggle to keep her relationship under wraps", before Aaron Brennan (Matt Wilson) "figures out" she hooked up with Clint. After people hear noises from their meet up room, they scramble to find a new area. Another story unfolds as spoilers reveal that Clint will be accused of "stealing from Eirene Rising". Further spoilers reveal that Jane is suspended from Erinsborough High after student Jasmine Stewart (Frankie Mazzone) spotted her "sneaking around" with Clint.

== Storylines ==
=== 1986–1989, 2005 ===
Jane was born in Erinsborough to Peter and Amanda Harris. Her parents were constantly busy and never really had time for her, but she could always count on her grandmother, Nell, who she went to live with at 16 when her parents moved to Hong Kong. She is teased at school for being somewhat clever, and is given the nickname "Plain Jane the Super-brain". This ends after her neighbours, Helen Daniels (Anne Haddy) and Daphne give her a makeover.

She gradually becomes friends with Charlene and Scott. Jane later starts to date Mike. Nell bans her from seeing Mike after her love rival Sue Parker (Kate Gorman) begins to send Nell poison pen letters about Mike. She later allows them be together when Daphne finds out Sue is behind the letters. After becoming lost in the bush with Shane Ramsay (Peter O'Brien), they strike up a friendship and share a bond, this makes Mike jealous. Her relationship with Mike gradually comes to an end. Amanda comes back to Erinsborough, under the ruse of getting to know her daughter when in reality she is hiding from being fined for insurance fraud. Jane and Nell eventually tell her to leave.

Jane then starts working for Paul Robinson at the Robinson Corporation, Jane and Scott spend more time together as she is helping him revise for his HSC retakes - Jane always had a crush on him, they later kiss but Henry witnesses it, he tells Charlene, who dumps Scott and refuses to talk to Jane. She eventually gets them back together when she pretends to pursue Scott, Charlene wants nothing more to do with her. Wanting to get away she is happy when Rosemary Daniels (Joy Chambers) then sees Jane's potential and tries to get her to work for her in New York for the Daniels Corporation, but Jane later decides she is not willing to leave her friends and family behind. Her next love interest is Mark Granger (Colin Handley) who proposes to her on 25 December 1988. While she accepts, the engagement does not last as Mark's mother (Mary Ward) takes an instant dislike towards Jane. Tony Romeo (Nick Carrafa) later tries to pass Jane off as his fiancée to his mother. Jane is furious with Tony and reveals the truth when she finds out he is also pursuing Sally Wells (Rowena Mohr).

She falls in love with Des, Daphne's widower and they became engaged. This engagement comes to an end when Nell suffers a heart attack and she goes to England to nurse her back to health. Des waits for his bride-to-be, but a few months later, Jane phones and tells Des that she can not go through with the wedding and settles down in England with her grandmother. In 2005, Jane appears in Annalise Hartman's (Kimberley Davies) documentary focusing on past residents of Ramsay Street, and she reveals that she is still living with Nell.

=== 2018–2022 ===
Almost thirty years after her in-person appearance, Jane returns to Erinsborough and visits Number 32, after being allowed to look around by home owner Dipi Rebecchi (Sharon Johal). Jane befriends Dipi's youngest daughter Kirsha Rebecchi (Vani Dhir) and offers to tutor her, so she can gain access to Number 32 to find something for Nell. Jane meets Paul Robinson at Lassiters Hotel and they go to his penthouse to catch up. Jane tells him she is divorced and has two children. She also tells him that Des has remarried his second wife, Mike is teaching children in the Philippines, and Paul's former wife Gail Robinson (Fiona Corke) says hello. Paul accuses Jane of being gossipy and judgemental like her grandmother. While discussing ways to regain Lassiters' five-star rating, Jane recalls the Lassiters Girl campaign and Paul suggests re-inventing it as the Face of Lassiters campaign, with Jane as a judge. While discussing the renovations made to Number 32 with Toadfish (Ryan Moloney) and Sonya Rebecchi (Eve Morey), Jane meets their daughter Nell Rebecchi (Scarlett Anderson), who they named after Mrs Mangel. Jane learns that the old fireplace is buried in the backyard and she calls Joe to tell him that she will need to dig it up.

Jane convinces Dipi to enter her family into the Face of Lassiters competition, so she can dig in the backyard. Jane hits a power cable with her shovel and receives an electric shock. She is found and revived by Karl Kennedy. She tells Dipi and her husband Shane Rebecchi (Nicholas Coghlan) that she is looking for some valuable stamps, which were hidden in the old fireplace, so she can afford to pay for a care home for Nell. They offer to help her find the stamps, but soon realise that the stamps are no longer at Number 32. Jane joins Paul for a drink and admits that she is somewhat relieved to be away from her grandmother. Joe then calls Jane to tell her that Nell has died. Paul arranges a flight to England for Jane, and he gifts her Mrs Mangel's portrait, which has been hanging in the hotel's lobby. When his daughter Amy Williams (Zoe Cramond) removes the portrait from the old frame, she finds the stamps. Jane uses some of the money from their sale to compensate Dipi and Toadie for their help, before she returns home.

A few months later, Terese Willis (Rebekah Elmaloglou) calls Jane back to Erinsborough. She arrives under the pretence that she is judging the relaunched Face of Lassiters campaign. Terese announces that there is an electrical issue on the fifth floor and while everyone else can be relocated, there is no room for Jane. Terese then suggests that Jane stays with Paul in his penthouse and they both agree. Jane is installed as the new principal of Erinsborough High following Susan Kennedy's (Jackie Woodburne) dismissal, and she immediately comes into conflict with Susan's niece and fellow teacher Elly Conway (Jodi Anasta) when she is late for her class and dresses inappropriately. Paul invites Jane out for a drink and they later share a kiss. Jane learns from Terese that she, Amy and Leo brought her back as a distraction for Paul, who has struggled to deal with Terese and Leo's relationship. Jane confronts Paul about his behaviour, and then asks if he still has feelings for Terese. He does not answer and Jane realises that he does, so she tells him that she will be finding somewhere else to live. Despite this, Jane and Paul later face up to their feelings for each other and start dating. Jane and Elly continue to clash and when Elly repeatedly disobeys the rules, Jane fires her, needing to lose a member of staff due to low enrolment levels. Jane realises Paul is still in love with Terese after she is injured in a shooting. She ends their relationship and decides to leave Erinsborough.

Over a year later, Jane returns to Erinsborough to meet Richard, a man she has met through online dating. She is devastated when Richard turns out to be a catfish and steals all her savings. Desperate for money, Jane appeals to Susan to have her teaching job at Erinsborough High back. Jane theorises that Richie Amblin (Lachlan Miller) might be her catfish, and when this is disproved, she accuses Elly of conning her as revenge for firing her last year. Paul uses a private investigator to find Jane's catfish, and she later receives a letter from 'Richard', sending her money back and claiming that he regrets his actions. This makes Jane more determined to find Richard, prompting Paul to confess that he wrote the letter as her catfish was an old enemy of his, Mannix Foster (Sam Webb). Jane confronts Mannix and warns him not to cross Paul again. She considers settling in Erinsborough and is thrilled when her cousin Sky Mangel (Stephanie McIntosh) comes to town to marry her fiancée Lana Crawford (Bridget Neval) as part of the Lassiter's Wedding Expo. Paul theorises that Jane still has feelings for Des Clarke, who has recently divorced, and brings him to town in the hope that he will reconnect with Jane. She is initially angry at Paul's matchmaking attempt, but when she causes an accident that injures Des, she realises her feelings for him and they reconcile their relationship. As Paul and Terese are looking for another couple to marry for the Wedding Expo, Jane proposes to Des and they have a ceremonial wedding, over thirty years after their initial engagement. After, Jane quits her job and they go away on honeymoon.

Five months later, Karl meets Jane in Perth and she reveals that she has split up with Des. Soon after, Terese calls Jane and discovers the break-up. Jane makes her promise not to tell Paul as she is ashamed of her short-lived marriage. Worried about Jane, Terese meets with her daughter Nicolette Stone, but discovers they are estranged. She explains to Terese that Jane hid Nicolette's sexuality from Mrs Mangel, worried about her reaction, and Nicolette moved away to Australia at a young age. Paul discovers Jane and Des' break-up from Nicolette and calls Jane to Erinsborough to make amends with her daughter. Jane and Nicolette clash but both ultimately decide to settle in Erinsborough, with Jane taking a job at Erinsborough High. She moves in with Karl and Susan, recognising that her presence disturbs Paul and Terese's marriage. Jane meddles by asking Clive Gibbons (Geoff Paine) to give Nicolette a job at Erinsborough Hospital, but Nicolette is unimpressed and finds employment as a live-in carer on Ramsay Street.

== Reception ==
Jane before and after her makeover, in a 1986 episode. The character's transformation has been the subject of significant media discussion.

For her portrayal of Jane, Jones won the Most Popular Actress award at the 1989 Logie Awards. The Times named her transformation as one of their top 15 most memorable Neighbours moments. They said "Again, a barely remembered moment, but long before the days of makeover television the momentous reveal of Jane – previously memorable in her daggy blazer and terribly parted hair – as super-foxy, big haired balldress-wearing lovely sent Mrs Mangel, and us, into shock".

Comedy Central a satellite television station which airs in the UK, branded her the 'Original Lassiters girl'. Also opining, Jones won Jane "a legion of male fans", the author himself confessed his attraction to her. Neil Wallis and Dave Hogan in their book The Neighbours Factfile, comment on Jane stating: "Brought in to replace Kylie Minogue as the main love interest in the show, her character Jane Harris proves to be much raunchier and man-hungry than Charlene ever was!" Orange UK describe Jane's style as "shy genius" and state she is famous for her "transformation from ugly duckling to beautiful swan" and obtained the serial's "hottest spunks".

Nick Harris of newspaper The Independent compared the makeover of Rangers Football Club to Jane's. They said she was a "geeky girl wearing mumsy sweaters" before a "glamour puss" and joked she looked "knock-down gorgeous – At least by late 1980s Ramsay Street standards." Entertainment website Lowculture published an article criticising various soap operas for using each other's storyline, in which they brand Jane's "geek makeover" as the most famous of all and that other storylines of the same nature, are repetitive.

Naomi Alderman of The Guardian branded her purposely failing her maths tests to get Mike's attention as "ridiculous", however she added: "As a teenager I remember having earnest discussions with other girls about it: was it really true? Did men not like clever girls? Ought we to try to appear less clever?" Whilst Owen Gibson of the newspaper said she was the "school swot" before she turned into a "beauty queen". Columnist Felicity Cloake compiled an advice guide to attending Christmas parties for the workplace, on style she advised her readers to look to Jane for inspiration if they want to "dress to impress".

Leeds culture website, Leeds Confidential stated the "makeover genre" has always fascinated them and mentioned the makeover as their prime example. Europe's leading drinks trade publication, The Drinks Business compared Jane to their brand of Antipodean beer commenting it's not as bland as it first appears. However they said that Jane is "notoriously nerdy". TV Cream refer to Jane as the "neighbourhood dag" and stated that she conformed to the "plain, bespectacled, bookish female" taking her glasses off and becoming the "ravishing beauty", they also brand her a minx for her antics with Scott. Sky Showbiz brand Jane as the serial's "super swot". Rod McPhee of Yorkshire Evening Post, stated that she went from "ostracised bookworm, who one day went from mousey nobody to sought-after siren, all because she lost the lenses". Additionally, he was confused why popular culture feels the need downgrade or upgrade someone's sex appeal because of the presence or absence of glasses. Geoff Dean also agrees with this point in his book "English for Gifted and Talented Students: 11–18 Years". However he added that able students seem to "lack a positive collective story or identity", making an example of Jane.

Lorna Cooper a columnist of website MSN TV, branded Jane and Des one of "TV's gruesome twosomes". She has listed Jane as one of Soap Opera's forgotten characters, claiming her as a favourite out of the golden era of Neighbours. Cooper once described her as "Seemingly mousey girl, who turned into a heartbreaker" and opines that she seemed to have liking for a "succession of older men". Jane is referred to in Emily Barr's fictitious novel "Out of My Depth", in which character Amanda is watching her on Neighbours. Jane is mentioned in radio presenter Tony Horne tour guide book "Hornes Down Under" in which he states he was not excited about visiting the set of Neighbours because in his opinion nothing good happened after the departures of Jane and Mike.

In February 2001, Jane was inducted into All About Soap's "Soap Hall of Fame". Writer Nick Chalmers stated that via Jane, Neighbours portrayed "the classic ugly duckling story". He described Jane as "Anthea Turner meets Miss Moneypenny" with "geeky glasses, plaits and pleated school skirts" who gained a "reputation for being a bit of a swot." Chalmers opined that Jane's make over was "what any self-respecting soap ugly duckling would do." He added Jane looked like "a different kind of person" complete with a hair-do that the hair stylist "Nicky Clarke would be proud of."

Of Jane's return, a reporter for the Evening Chronicle observed, "It's 29 years since we saw her and, no longer meek and mild, she shakes things up by confronting Paul and making judgemental comments – it seems that years of living with her grandmother, Mrs Mangel, have changed her somewhat." A Birmingham Mail reporter was pleased with Jane's permanent return, writing "How great is it having Jane back in Erinsborough? She was as synonymous with the eighties as Top Gun and Kylie." In 2022, Kate Randall from Heat included Jane and Mike in the magazine's top ten Neighbours characters of all time feature. Jane was placed at number sixteen on the Huffpost's "35 greatest Neighbours characters of all time" feature. Journalist Adam Beresford described "mousy" Jane as originally being a "studious and serious, bespectacled schoolgirl". He concluded that her make-over was "the biggest transformation we’d ever seen." Lorna White from Yours profiled the magazine's "favourite Neighbours characters of all time", which included Jane. Jane discovering Amanda's death was nominated in the "Saddest Soap Moment" category at the 2025 Digital Spy Reader Awards.
