= Sally Wells =

- Neighbours character
- Portrayed by: Rowena Mohr
- Duration: 1987–1988
- First appearance: 15 October 1987
- Last appearance: 13 May 1988
- Introduced by: Reg Watson
In-universe information
- Occupation: Waitress
- Father: Malcolm Clarke
- Mother: Kate Wells
- Half-brothers: Des Clarke
- Nephews: Jamie Clarke

Sally Wells is a fictional character from the Australian soap opera Neighbours, played by Rowena Mohr. She debuted on-screen during the episode airing on 15 October 1987. During her time in the serial her storylines were centered on her on-screen brother Des and trying to find her biological father. Mohr left the cast after Sally was axed because she did not fit in with the direction of storytelling producers were aiming for.

== Casting ==
The character was created as the sister of Des Clarke (Paul Keane) and a new love interest for Henry Ramsay (Craig McLachlan). In September 1987 it was announced that actress Rowena Mohr had been cast as Sally. Of her casting Mohr said she was nervous because the serial was in its peak popularity at the time, but the cast helped her to settle in. Mohr was also given the opportunity to write scripts for Neighbours.

== Development ==
Sally is characterised by her constant need to have things her own way. She has been described as a strikingly pretty woman, catching the attention of all the other male characters, especially Henry. Mohr commented during an interview that "Sally was a bit of a control freak really. I think she liked to think she was easy going but she wasn't at all and she didn't cope very well when things didn't go the way she planned." She added that Sally was "good fun to play" because she is "a bit cranky at times and said what she thought." Mohr believed these character traits originated in Sally's childhood. She explained that "I think she was probably just trying to compensate for not really having any parents and having to make her own way in the world." Mohr has also described Sally as "ruthless, stubborn and pig-headed but likeable. She's straightforward, really, and she gives the boys a hard time." In her backstory, Sally had trained to be an aerobics and gym teacher. Mohr found it difficult because she had never done aerobics. To research the role, she joined a gym and quit smoking cigarettes.

Sally's introductory story featured her arriving in Erinsborough in search of her father, Malcolm Clarke (Noel Trevarthen). Upon her arrival she learns that Des is her half-brother. Their backstory is explored and they discover that Malcolm had a brief romance with Sally's mother Kate after he had abandoned Des and his mother Eileen Clarke (Myra De Groot). Malcolm repeats this behaviour and leaves Kate alone. Mohr told Coral O'Connor from the Daily Mirror that Kate did not tell Malcolm she was pregnant and he does not know she exists. Sally had been working at the local coffee shop and concealing her true identity. Sally hides her gym instructor career from Des and pretends to be a cook. Mohr defended her characters actions explaining that "she comes to Erinsbrough to look for Des and Malcolm and goes about it in an underhand way because she doesn't know how she will be received."

When Des discovers that Sally is trying to locate Malcolm, Mohr stated "he doesn't want to know." But Sally soon locates Malcolm and convinces him to visit his estranged family. Trevarthen described Malcolm as an unreliable father and loner, who is reluctant to reconnect with his family. Trevarthen told O'Connor (Daily Mirror) writer that "he is not a reliable bloke. Malcolm is a carpenter. A very ordinary bloke who wants to be alone." Malcolm does not want to visit Des either and Trevarthen concluded that he "gets pushed into it" by Sally.

As a love interest of Henry, the character was at the center of romantic dramas. Writers quickly introduced Nick Carrafa to play Henry's love rival Tony Romeo. Tony soon gets involved in their new relationship leading him and Henry to have a fist fight over Sally. The feud begins when Henry witnesses Tony flirting with Sally. Carrafa told Mark Foster from Neighbours Who's Who that "Henry comes over claiming that Sally is his girl and Tony and Henry end up getting into a fist-fight in front of Lassiters." Tony soon realises that Henry is lying and decides to out do his rival. Carrafa added "Tony finds out Henry and Sally aren't a 'unit' and he decides to ask her out. So he's still in there with a chance." Of Sally and Henry's doomed relationship Mohr stated that "I don't get to marry Henry. He's still single, so there's hope for all you girls yet."

In 1988, the show's producer axed the character, with Mohr citing that she felt they didn't think Sally fitted in with new storylines they were planning. She then left to pursue projects in the UK, she later revealed that she would never reprise the role. Discussing Sally's departure, Mohr told a reporter from The Sentinel that "the story line for my character is that I leave for a European cruise."

== Storylines ==
Sally had been brought up in Perth by her mother Kate. She comes to Ramsay Street in search of her father, Malcolm. She finds out Des is her half-brother. Sally becomes close to Eileen. Together Des and Sally decide to track their father down. They later track him down and are surprised to find him living locally. Malcolm is happy to get to know his newfound children, they all become close.

Sally then decides to move into a flat locally and stays around. She lets Tony move in with her. Tony pretends he will marry Jane Harris (Annie Jones) when he learns his mother, Elinora (Kate Jason) is coming to town. Jane initially plays along with it, but is annoyed to learn Tony has been trying to romance Sally all along. Sally then starts dating Henry Ramsay, they get along well at first, spending much time together. Henry starts to adore her and they are smitten.

Des' wife Daphne Clarke (Elaine Smith) is killed in a car accident, Eileen has a nervous breakdown. These events begin to take their toll on Sally worrying about her newfound family. Malcolm wins tickets to travel to Europe, he asks Eileen and Sally to join him on his trip. Sally initially is not certain of what to do, but later decides it is the right thing to do. Henry is left devastated and pleads with her to stay with him but Sally leaves for her new life without Henry.

== Reception ==
The BBC said Sally's most notable moment was "Finding out she had a brother she didn't know about – Des." A reporter from the Evening Express branded Sally the "Ramsay Street fitness fanatic". Coral O'Connor of the Daily Mirror branded her "saucy Sally" and a "mysterious redhead".
