= Fear of the Dark =

Fear of the Dark may refer to:

- Fear of the dark, a common phobia

== Film ==
- Fear(s) of the Dark, a 2007 French anthology film
- Fear of the Dark (2003 film), a 2003 Canadian horror film starring Jesse James

== Literature ==
- Fear of the Dark (novel), a Doctor Who novel
- Fear of the Dark, a 2006 novel by Walter Mosley
- Fear of the Dark, a 1988 novel by Gar Anthony Haywood which won the Shamus Award

== Music ==
- Fear of the Dark (Iron Maiden album) (1992)
  - "Fear of the Dark" (song), a song by Iron Maiden
- Fear of the Dark (Gordon Giltrap album)
- "Fear of the Dark", a 1981 song by Scars from Author! Author!

== See also ==
- "Scared of the Dark", a 2017 song by Steps
- Afraid of the Dark (disambiguation)
