= List of Neighbours characters introduced in 1987 =

Neighbours is an Australian television soap opera that was first broadcast on 18 March 1985. The following is a list of characters that first appeared in the serial in 1987, by order of first appearance. All characters were introduced by the show's executive producer Reg Watson. The third season of Neighbours began airing on 5 January 1987. Harold Bishop arrived during the same month. February saw the introductions of Bouncer and Henry Mitchell, son of established character Madge Mitchell. In March, Fiona Corke began playing Gail Lewis and Ernie Bourne took on the role of Gail's adoptive father, Rob. April saw the arrival of businessman Mr. Udagawa. Anne Scott-Pendlebury began appearing as Hilary Robinson in June. The following month saw the first appearances of new doctor Beverly Marshall, played by Lisa Armytage, Gino Rossini and Melanie Pearson. July also saw the birth of Jamie Clarke, son of Des and Daphne Clarke. Briony Behets began playing Amanda Harris in August. Russell Crowe was introduced as Kenny Larkin the following month. October saw the arrivals of Sally Wells and Greg Cooper. Athlete Pete Baxter, Des and Sally's father, Malcolm Clarke, and mechanic Tony Romeo made their first appearances in November.

== Harold Bishop ==
Harold Bishop, played by Ian Smith, made his first appearance as Harold during the episode broadcast on 30 January 1987. He departed in September 1991, but returned five years later in October 1996. Harold remained on screen for over twelve years, making him one of the longest-running characters in the show's history. Smith announced his departure from Neighbours in August 2008. Following a cancer storyline, Harold made his final appearance on 27 February 2009. In December 2010, Smith revealed that he would be reprising his role and Harold returned on 9 May 2011. Harold is described as being "indecisive, considerate, stuffy and reserved." Smith has earned various award nominations for his role as Harold. At the 2007 Inside Soap Awards, he was nominated for "Funniest Performance." The following year saw Smith nominated for "Funniest Performance" again and "Best Actor." In 2009, Smith was once again nominated for "Funniest Performance" and "Best Storyline" for Harold's cancer. That same year he was nominated for the "Most Popular Personality" and "Most Popular Actor" Logie Awards.

== Bouncer ==
Bouncer made his first appearance during the episode broadcast on 4 February 1987 and he exited the series on 12 February 1993 after six years. He was trained by Luke Hura. When Neighbours needed a golden Labrador puppy, they turned to animal trainer Luke Hura and his canine actors agency, who provided them with Bouncer. Bouncer was paid more than the human actors and Hura revealed that he was worth between $100,000 and $200,000. Bouncer's fan cards became the most popular out of any cast member. One of Bouncer's most famous storylines had him dreaming that he was marrying Rosie, Clarrie McLachlan's Sheepdog, who lived next door. During an interview, Anne Charleston (who played Madge Bishop) said "The whole cast was mortified about that! It reduced it to a three-year-old's programme. It was very strange." Thirteen weeks after finishing his final scenes on Neighbours, Bouncer died of cancer aged seven. Following his death, Bouncer was sent more tributes from fans around the world than any of the human cast. MSN TV editor Lorna Cooper also commented on Bouncer and his dream stating: "Neighbours featured some bizarre dream sequences: there was the Christmas edition with Mike Young and Shane Ramsay as Tweedle Dum and Tweedle Dee and the episode in which Harold Bishop fantasised about being a Scottish laird. But nothing has topped Bouncer the Labrador's dream that he was marrying Clarrie McLachlan's dog, Rosie. What were the writers thinking?" Bouncer's dream was later named the second "weirdest" storyline in the show's history.

== Henry Ramsay ==
Henry Ramsay (also Mitchell), played by Craig McLachlan. He made his first on-screen appearance on 19 February 1987. Henry departed on 23 November 1989. McLachlan won three Logie Awards for his role as Henry during his time with Neighbours. He was also nominated for 'Most Popular Personality'. The following year he won the 'Most Popular Actor' award again and 'Most Popular Personality'. Following the departure of Peter O'Brien (Shane Ramsay), producers began a search for a new "hunk" to keep the female viewers interested. McLachlan was 21 when he auditioned for Neighbours and despite having no prior acting experience, apart from a brief appearance in Sons and Daughters, he was cast as Henry Mitchell. McLachlan initially signed on to Neighbours for six weeks. Henry was described as "living under a cloud of suspicion" from the other neighbours after they learnt about his criminal record. He was also described as being streetwise, irresistible and a ladies man. Henry counteracted his "beefy image" by being a bit mischievous and "good for a laugh". This led to him being called the "Punk who turned Hunk" by John Kercher in his 1989 Neighbours: facts, features, interviews with your favourite TV stars book. McLachlan described his character as being "fun-loving" and "wacky". In the UK, 16.6 million viewers watched Henry leave Ramsay Street in 1991.

== Gail Robinson ==
Gail Lewis (previously Robinson), played by Fiona Corke. She made her first appearance on-screen on 11 March 1987. She departed on 27 June 2007. She made guest appearances in 2005, 2006 and 2007. Corke described her time on the show as "an amazing experience" and added "It was so full on and so huge you didn't know if you were an actor or in a pop group half the time." In 1988, Corke became one of ten actors from the show who were flown to London to perform in front of the Queen at the Royal Variety Performance. Corke departed Neighbours in 1989 after deciding she wanted to experience life outside of the show. In 2005, Corke was one of many ex-cast members who made a return to Neighbours to appear in an episode celebrating the show's 20th anniversary. In December 2009, Stefan Dennis called for the return of Gail and Corke. The BBC said Gail's most notable moment was "Running off with the triplets." Ruth Deller of television website Lowculture said Gail was the "most well-remembered" of Paul's wives. Of Gail and Paul's relationship The Sydney Morning Herald said "we fretted for what seemed like days until Gail Lewis (Fiona Corke) sashayed into Mr R's love zone. We knew from the start that Paul and Gail were star crossed. But who could have predicted that one love's rose could have so many thorns."

== Rob Lewis ==
Rob Lewis
- Neighbours character
- Portrayed by: Ernie Bourne
- Duration: 1987–1989
- First appearance: 17 March 1987
- Last appearance: 15 September 1989
- Introduced by: Reg Watson
In-universe information
- Occupation: Mechanic
- Wife: Brenda Lewis (backstory); Gloria Lewis (1988–1989)
- Adoptive daughters: Gail Robinson

Robert "Rob" Lewis, played by Ernie Bourne, made his first appearance on 17 March 1987. Neil Wallis and Dave Hogan, authors of The Neighbours Factfile described Rob as "a nice ordinary guy with very simple tastes, though a bit too fond of both his favourite beer – Tooheys – and betting." They also added that he was a "mechanical genius", who could rebuild any car. A writer for BBC Online said the character's most notable moment as "Arriving drunk and embarrassing Gail".

Rob opens his own garage in Erinsborough and moves into Number 22 Ramsay Street with his adopted daughter, Gail (Fiona Corke). He moves out when Gail marries Paul Robinson (Stefan Dennis) but remains local. He goes into partnership with Harold Bishop (Ian Smith) but problems crop up due to the two men being polar opposites and constant arguing. Matters are made worse when Rob tries to woo Madge Ramsay (Anne Charleston). Rob misses the wedding of Scott Robinson (Jason Donovan) and Charlene Mitchell (Kylie Minogue) for a lone drinking session, although he also gives Charlene indenture papers for a four-year apprenticeship at the garage as a wedding present. Gail is concerned about his change in behaviour and Harold accuses Rob of stealing money from the garage, which Rob confesses to. Rob reveals he took the money to pay off debts incurred by betting on racehorses. Harold is annoyed and sells his half of the business to Jim Robinson (Alan Dale).

When Gail decides to look for her biological parents, Rob is upset at the idea. Gail is distraught to discover her biological mother, Louise is dead but finds her father, Ian Chadwick (Robin Bowering). Rob, out of jealousy, confronts Ian and warns him away. His plan backfires and Gail is disgusted and refuses to speak to Rob until he apologises to Ian. Rob grows more and more stubborn and competes for Gail's affections with Ian by buying gifts for Gail and Paul's wedding anniversary. Gail tells Rob, no matter what, he will always be her real father and he apologises and gives Ian his blessing to remain in contact with Gail.

Rob meets Gloria Gardner (Beverly Phillips) and falls in love with her. Gail is unimpressed due to Gloria's dress sense and loud personality. Their engagement is met with hostility from Gail and Gloria's son Dean (Andrew Larkins), but they realise their respective single parents love each other and are meant to be together. Paul soon discovers Rob is receiving stolen parts in order to save money and an argument ensues resulting in Rob driving off in a rainstorm and crashing his car. He is hospitalized with serious injuries and comatose for several days. Rob regains consciousness and tells Gloria and Gail to look after each other before going into cardiac arrest and dying.

== Mr Udagawa ==
Mr Udagawa
- Neighbours character
- Portrayed by: Lawrence Mah
- Duration: 1987, 1989, 1992, 2017
- First appearance: 23 April 1987
- Last appearance: 10 October 2017
- Introduced by: Reg Watson (1987); Don Battye (1989, 1992); Jason Herbison (2017)
In-universe information
- Occupation: Owner of the Erins Burrow Motel; Businessman
- Wife: Mrs Udagawa
- Sons: Hiroshi Udagawa
- Grandsons: James Udagawa (step)
- Granddaughters: Jasmine Udagawa

Toshiro Udagawa (commonly known as Mr. Udagawa), played by Lawrence Mah, made his first appearance on 23 April 1987 and made intermittent appearances over the next five years. In 2017, Mah returned to the serial.

In 2005, Mr. Udagawa topped a BBC website poll of "Top 20 Most Obscure Neighbours characters". Readers described him as "a legendary Japanese businessman who seemed to spend his entire career visiting Paul Robinson at Lassiter's. The part of Mr Udagawa did not call for huge dialogue, but it was nonetheless played with a kind of brooding yet dignified menace. It's a great pity that Mr Udagawa was not asked back for the 20th anniversary celebrations, as it would have been nice to see how his career has progressed since those Erinsborough-obsessed days of the late 1980s."

Mr. Udagawa is a client of the Daniels Corporation. He deals with Rosemary Daniels' (Joy Chambers) nephew Paul Robinson (Stefan Dennis) and is impressed to learn Rosemary's mother Helen Daniels (Anne Haddy) also runs her own chauffeur business "Home James". Paul invites Mr. Udagawa to dinner and is successful and steps up his quest to secure a business deal by announcing that he and Gail Lewis (Fiona Corke) are engaged to be married. Mr. Udagawa then presents them with a Bonsai tree and later gives them a Japanese scroll when he returns. After witnessing some domestics and the truth about Paul and Gail's engagement, Mr Udagawa decides against making any further deals with Paul. However, Gail is able to talk him into signing with the corporation. He returns in 1989 and begins doing business with the pacific bank. Des Clarke (Paul Keane), learns Japanese in order to impress Mr. Udagawa but he mixes up the phrases and accidentally refers to all Japanese women as "dirty" instead of beautiful. Des is briefly fired but Paul is able to explain matters. While attending dinner at Number 28 with his wife Mrs Udagawa (Joyce Uwen), Mr. Udagawa assumes that Des is engaged to Kerry Bishop (Linda Hartley-Clark), prompting jealousy from Joe Mangel (Mark Little) who barges in, attempting to attack Des but in the process knocking himself out. Mr. Udagawa reappears in 1992 and meets Paul's father, Jim (Alan Dale) for a drink, but the meeting is cut short when Jim's daughter Lucy (Melissa Bell) goes for a late-night swim in Lassiter's pond. He later asks Paul to take over the running of some hotels in Hawaii and Paul accepts.

25 years later, Mr. Udagawa returns to Erinsborough and meets with Paul at his motel complex, Robinsons, which he previously owned under the name the Erins Burrow Motel. Leo Tanaka (Tim Kano) is convinced that Mr Udagawa's son, Hiro, is his biological father as his mother Kim Tanaka (Jenny Young) had previously had a relationship with him but Mr. Udagawa confirms Hiro was overseas when Leo and his brother David Tanaka (Takaya Honda) were conceived. When Mr Udagawa is prepared to withdraw his investment from the hotel after manager Terese Willis (Rebekah Elmaloglou) lies about her cancer diagnosis, Paul persuades him to give her another chance, which he does. Mr. Udagawa returns a few months later to oversee the sale of his Lassiter's investments to Paul.

== Hilary Robinson ==
Hilary Robinson, played by Anne Scott-Pendlebury, first appeared on-screen during the episode broadcast on 25 June 1987. She returned in 1988 in a guest capacity and then returned in a permanent role in 1989. The character departed the show on 28 February 1990. Scott-Pendlebury reprised her role in 2005 for the serial's 20th anniversary episode. Hilary was central to many storylines including Tax evasion, animal rights and interfering with her neighbours personal lives. Ruth Deller of entertainment website Lowculture commented on Hilary stating: "Jim's cousin Hilary was one of the street's best busybodies. She was mostly a recurring guest character in the series, although she did have a stint as a permanent resident. She was a bit of a 'fusspot' but with her heart in the right place". To celebrate the 20th anniversary of Neighbours, the BBC asked readers to nominate their 20 favourite obscure characters. Hilary came in fourth place and the readers called her "perpetually bitchy and irascible – got on everyone's nerves and was hugely funny". They added, "Appeared sporadically in the late 80s. She wasn't based in Erinsborough but somehow got Jim and Beverly together -as if Dr Bev would ever have been a friend of such an old witch!!". In Neighbours: The Official Annual 1991, John McCready and Nicola Furlong said that Sharon Davies (Jessica Muschamp) never got any peace and tranquillity when Hilary was around. They also said Scott-Pendlebury had made a mark on Neighbours. A writer from Inside Soap branded Hilary Ramsay Street's "strait-laced resident".

== Beverly Marshall ==
Beverly Marshall made her first appearance on 6 July 1987, played by Lisa Armytage. Shaunna O'Grady took over from Armytage and began playing the character from 16 March 1989 until her departure on 5 September 1990. In 2005, O'Grady became one of many ex-cast members who made a return to Neighbours to appear in an episode celebrating the show's 20th anniversary. Beverly was named as a "firm favourite with viewers" in John Kercher's 1989 book, Neighbours: facts, features, interviews with your favourite TV stars. Kercher also named Beverly's relationship with Jim as "intriguing". Ruth Deller named Beverly as Ramsay Street's "superdoc". In another feature, Lowculture called Beverly the "resident awesome all-powerful Neighbours doctor who came inbetween Clive Gibbons and Karl Kennedy". The BBC said Beverly's most notable moment was "When she slapped one of her patients."

== Gino Rossini ==
Gino Rossini, played by Joey Perrone, made his first on-screen appearance on 22 July 1987. and left on 31 July. Producers hired Perrone to play a two-week guest role on the show. His main profession was a singer and Gino was his first ever acting role. Perrone was as "nervous as hell" when he began filming, but fellow cast members helped him out. Gino is an Italian character who arrives in Erinsborough to work at Daphne Clarke (Elaine Smith) coffee shop. Perrone told Kelly Bourne from TV Week that Gino is the son of a chef who was supposed to start work in the coffee shop. Gino's father is too ill and he decides to do the work for him. Gino is a "happy go lucky" character with a "lovable and easy going nature". He also takes to charming the females in the show and even tries to steal Mike Young's (Guy Pearce) girlfriend Jane Harris (Annie Jones). Perrone explained that "Gino sees that Jane and Mike have fallen out and Jane is unhappy so he offers to cheer her up and take her out."

Gino is hired by Daphne to work in the coffee shop after she is impressed by his references, but he reveals they are his sick father's and he cannot cook at all. However, Gino's father is offered the job once he recovers. Gino briefly dates Melanie Pearson (Lucinda Cowden) before leaving.

== Jamie Clarke ==
James Kingsley "Jamie" Clarke made his first appearance on 30 July 1987, following his birth. The character was originally played by Sarah Jane Dey from the character's birth and introduction. Ryder Susman briefly took over the role in 1989, before Dey returned. Dey said she had to leave because of her hair length. In 1989, brothers Nicholas and James Mason took over the role of Jamie until his departure in 1990. In 2003, the character returned, this time played by Angus McLaren. A writer for the BBC described Jamie's most notable moments as "Being involved in a car crash which left his mother, Daphne in a coma" and "Returning to the Street in 2004 to claim his inheritance."

== Melanie Pearson ==
Melanie Pearson (also Mangel), played by Lucinda Cowden, made her first appearance during the episode broadcast on 30 July 1987. The character departed on 24 October 1991. Cowden joined the cast of Neighbours as Melanie for seven episodes in 1987. She returned for six episodes the following year. Cowden left to star in The Power, The Passion, but after the show was cancelled Cowden decided to call the Neighbours producer about a return. In 2005, Cowden reprised her role for Neighbours' 20th anniversary celebrations. A writer for the BBC's Neighbours website said Melanie's most notable moment was "Asking Joe to marry her". Ian Morrison, author of Neighbours: The Official Annual 1992, stated "If Melanie offers to lend a hand beware...her efforts don't always turn out as she would like!" Katy Moon from Inside Soap praised Joe and Melanie's wedding, saying "No one can get hitched in soap these days without some kind of ruckus. But Joe Mangel and Melanie Pearson's wedding was a breeze and harks back to a time of innocence in soapland." Moon commented that Joe had found his match "in bubbly Mel". A Coventry Telegraph reporter observed that Melanie became "a soap favourite" and branded her a "girl next door with a foghorn laugh, the dizzy secretary with a heart of gold who had thousands of viewers tuning in to watch her antics." Writing for BBC News, Genevieve Hassan included Melanie's laugh in her feature on the show's memorable moments."

== Amanda Harris ==
Amanda Harris
- Neighbours character
- Portrayed by: Briony Behets
- Duration: 1987, 2025
- First appearance: 13 August 1987
- Last appearance: 27 May 2025
- Introduced by: Reg Watson (1987); Jason Herbison (2025)
In-universe information
- Occupation: Businesswoman; Retired
- Father: Len Mangel
- Mother: Nell Mangel
- Brothers: Joe Mangel
- Husband: Peter Harris (backstory)
- Daughters: Jane Harris
- Grandsons: Byron Stone
- Granddaughters: Nicolette Stone
- Other relatives: Isla Tanaka-Brennan

Amanda Harris, played by Briony Behets, made her first appearance on 13 August 1987. The character was introduced in an effort to explore Jane Harris's (Annie Jones) backstory. Amanda comes to Erinsborough to reconnect with her daughter, having abandoned her to start a new life in Hong Kong. Amanda was described as being a "glamorous but ageing socialite" by a columnist for TV Week. When a "scheming" Amanda notices how attractive Jane has become, she tries competing against her in order to get more attention. On 31 March 2025, Daniel Kilkelly of Digital Spy reported that Behets had reprised the role after almost 38 years. Her character returns to Erinsborough to live at Eirini Rising, a retirement community, and to reconnect with her daughter and grandchildren. Amanda's return scenes will air from 23 April 2025.

Amanda returns to Erinsborough after learning her mother, Nell Mangel (Vivean Gray), has suffered a heart attack. Amanda tells Nell she will take care of her house while she recovers. Amanda also tries to reconnect with her daughter, Jane. She notices that Jane is wearing make-up and no longer wears her glasses. Fearing Jane is now more attractive than she is, Amanda manipulates her daughter into removing her make-up, tying her hair back, and wearing her glasses again. Jane's confidence suffers, but she is pleased to have Amanda back. Amanda clashes with her mother's neighbour Madge Ramsay (Anne Charleston). Madge's son Henry (Craig McLachlan) is attracted to Amanda but backs off when he realises she is Jane's mother. Amanda then tells Henry, who is interested in Jane that Jane is only dating him to make Mike Young (Guy Pearce) jealous. She also butts heads with Madge when she accuses her of causing Nell's heart attack several months earlier. Amanda slowly manages to alienate most of Jane's friends with her behaviour. When Mike confronts Amanda about being jealous, she slaps him. It soon emerges that Amanda only has returned to Erinsborough to hide, as she has committed insurance fraud. Nell and Jane ask her to leave and she returns to Hong Kong. The following year, Jane phones Amanda, inviting her to attend to Nell's wedding to John Worthington (Brian James) but Amanda tells her she is too busy attend. Amanda's brother Joe (Mark Little) overhears the conversation, takes the receiver and tells her off for being too selfish to attend their mother's wedding before hanging up.

Decades later, Amanda arrives to move into the Eirene Rising retirement complex and is greeted by staff Karl (Alan Fletcher) and Susan Kennedy (Jackie Woodburne) and Darcy Tyler (Mark Raffety). Susan and Darcy help her settle into her apartment, and Susan spots a photo of her and Jane, and she realizes she is Jane's mother. Amanda asks Susan not to tell Jane she is here, and she reluctantly agrees.

== Kenny Larkin ==
Kenny Larkin
- Neighbours character
- Portrayed by: Russell Crowe
- First appearance: 21 September 1987
- Last appearance: 12 October 1987
- Introduced by: Reg Watson
In-universe information
- Sisters: B.B. Larkin

Kenny Larkin, played by Russell Crowe, made his first appearance on 21 September 1987. Kenny is introduced as a former cellmate of Henry Ramsay (Craig McLachlan). The part of Kenny was Crowe's first recurrent television role and lasted four episodes. In a biography about Crowe written by Martin Howden, Crowe initially expressed reluctance to take on the role. "I was reading the script and I'm thinking, 'This is awful'. Then I get to the last scene and I've got to punch Craig McLachlan, and Jason Donovan tries to break up the fight, while Kylie Minogue is riding on my back trying to strangle me. And I went "I'll do it.". Crowe claimed he had been paid more money for the four episodes he appeared in than his whole season at The Melbourne Theatre. British newspapers reported that Crowe was to reprise role as part of the serial's 20th Anniversary celebrations in 2005 but his representative later confirmed that this was not true.

Of his casting in a later interview, Crowe said "I was on the set for three hours one morning…it is really unfair to keep associating me with the show." In a feature chronicling successful Neighbours alumni, The Sydney Morning Herald described Kenny as a "small-time crook". The Mirror described Kenny, who they listed at Number 9 in a list of 23 Neighbours actors who left to conquer Hollywood, as "a dodgy ex-con, who was up to no good at all". Wales Online labeled Kenny "a bruiser". Hadley Freeman of The Guardian jokingly asked in her article on Crowe's auction following his divorce from Danielle Spencer; "Where is Kenny Larkin's leather jacket?" in regard to his lack of souvenirs from his time on Neighbours. Freeman further asked "Where is Bouncer's lead? A napkin from Lassiter's? A business card from Helen Daniels' taxi service, Home James? It's really like Russell doesn't appreciate cultural history."

Henry makes a $50 bet with Kenny that he can beat him in a darts competition held at Waterhole, where Henry works, but Kenny hustles him by feigning an arm injury and having his sister, B.B. (Tamasin Ramsay) throw for him. B.B. plays terribly at first but when Henry doubles the bet she scores a bullseye, leaving Henry $100 out of pocket. A few days later, Henry buys a round of drinks with a $50 note and Kenny memorizes the last three serial digits and causes trouble for Henry and his mother Madge (Anne Charleston) by telling her she short-changed him and after Kenny recites the serial number to Madge and Henry's boss, Paul Robinson (Stefan Dennis), she gives Kenny $45 in change. Madge and Henry are both in the frame for a scheme and an enraged Henry threatens Kenny with violence until he confesses everything. The following week, Kenny begins a smear campaign against Henry exposing his criminal past to his gardening clients. Henry confronts him and a fight breaks out at Lassiter's and Scott Robinson (Donovan) tries to break it up. Paul witnesses the scene and bars Kenny from the complex for good.

== Sally Wells ==
Sally Wells, played by Rowena Mohr, made her first appearance on 15 October 1987. The character was created as the sister of Des Clarke (Paul Keane) and a new love interest for Henry Ramsay (Craig McLachlan). In September 1987, it was announced that Mohr had been cast as Sally. Of her casting Mohr said she was nervous because the serial was in its peak popularity at the time, but the cast had helped her to settle in. Sally is characterised by her constant need to have things her own way. She has been described as a strikingly pretty woman, catching the attention of all the other male characters, especially Henry. The serial's producer axed the character, with Mohr citing that she felt they did not think Sally fitted in with new storylines they were planning. She then left to pursue projects in the UK, she later revealed that she would never reprise the role. A writer for the BBC's Neighbours website said Sally's most notable moment was "Finding out she had a brother she didn't know about – Des."

== Greg Cooper ==
Greg Cooper
- Neighbours character
- Portrayed by: Alan Fletcher
- First appearance: 19 October 1987
- Last appearance: 10 November 1987
- Introduced by: Reg Watson
In-universe information
- Occupation: Mechanic
- Brothers: Colin Cooper

Greg Cooper, played by Alan Fletcher, made his first appearance on 19 October 1987. Fletcher was appearing in a theatre production when he received the offer to appear in Neighbours. He commented "Of course I was delighted, but it was interesting doing theatre and TV at the same time. It was very tiring!" Fletcher filmed his scenes over a three-week period and described the part as a "fill in job" as the show was between actors. He explained that after actor Ernie Bourne left his role of Rob Lewis, the producers planned to replace him with Nick Carrafa's Tony Romeo, but there was a three-week gap between Carrafa's first appearance, which led them to create the character of Greg, who acted as Charlene Robinson's (Kylie Minogue) supervisor. Fletcher was later asked to rejoin the cast for a year, but he turned the offer down to continue working in the theatre. Fletcher returned to the show seven years later in the role of Karl Kennedy. Comparing the two characters, Fletcher said it was more enjoyable playing Karl for twenty years than it would have been playing Greg for a couple of years. A writer for the show's official website commented, "imagine how different Erinsborough would have been had Mr Cooper hung around longer... we might not have ever met Dr Karl Kennedy and that would have been a very sad day."

Greg comes to Erinsborough to work at the local garage. He catches up with Des Clarke (Paul Keane), who had been friends with him and his brother Colin. Greg reveals that Colin has died. During a dinner party, Des tries to talk to Greg about Colin, but Greg becomes upset and leaves. Des recalls Greg had an interest in boxing, but Colin was the more talented of the two. Greg's behaviour changes and starts becoming erratic, until one day he breaks down and confesses to his boss Jim Robinson (Alan Dale) that he caused Colin's death. He explains that his then-girlfriend left him for Colin, so he went into the boxing ring with Colin and beat him. Colin fell and hit his head as he was leaving the ring, killing him. Even though Greg was cleared of causing his death, he still blames himself. Greg decides to quit his job and leaves town, after telling his friend Tony Romeo about an opening at the garage for a qualified mechanic.

== Pete Baxter ==
Pete Baxter
- Neighbours character
- Portrayed by: Tony Briggs
- Duration: 1987–1988
- First appearance: 13 November 1987
- Last appearance: 2 August 1988
- Introduced by: Reg Watson
In-universe information
- Other names: Peter Baxter
- Occupation: Athlete, Bank Teller

Pete Baxter, played by Tony Briggs, made his first appearance on 13 November 1987. The character is introduced as a school friend of Mike Young (Guy Pearce), but he is also reunited with his fellow school friends Scott Robinson (Jason Donovan) and Charlene Mitchell (Kylie Minogue). Pete is billed as "a happy-go-lucky practical joker". Like Briggs, Pete is also an athlete, as well as "intelligent and hard-working". Briggs was the first Aboriginal actor to appear in Neighbours.

Pete is a former classmate of Mike Young (Pearce), who begins working at the Pacific Bank with Des Clarke (Paul Keane). Des quickly learns that Pete is an athlete who has the chance of going to the 1988 Seoul Olympics. When he and the other Erinsborough residents learn that Pete will not be able to support himself while he attends the Australian Institute of Sport in Canberra, they hold a scavenger hunt to raise the money. Des is also able to get Pete the time off so he can attend. Scott Robinson (Donovan) joins Pete at the institute to report on his progress, while Mike acts as his official photographer. Pete starts to push himself too hard while running and suffers an injury, which he tries to keep secret. Mike and Scott tell his chaperone Rachel Frazer (Pamela Hawksford), who reports it to the doctors. Pete is initially angry with Rachel, but soon realises that his injury could become permanent without treatment.

Several weeks later, Mike learns Pete has left the institute. Pete eventually comes to the Coffee Shop and explains that he walked out. Mike contacts Rachel, before confronting Pete, who admits that he has badly injured his leg after ignoring advice from the doctors. Des helps Pete get his job back at the bank, while Scott encourages Pete to train for the Commonwealth Games or the next Olympics. Pete tells him to mind his own business and later snaps at Todd Landers (Kristian Schmid) when he asks him to help with sports training at Erinsborough High. Pete soon realises that he is being stupid and decides to help out at the school, while also resuming his training.

== Malcolm Clarke ==
Malcolm Clarke
- Neighbours character
- Portrayed by: Noel Trevarthen
- Duration: 1987–1988
- First appearance: 23 November 1987
- Last appearance: 25 November 1988
- Introduced by: Reg Watson
In-universe information
- Occupation: Carpenter
- Wife: Eileen Clarke (divorced)
- Sons: Des Clarke
- Daughters: Sally Wells
- Grandsons: Jamie Clarke

Malcolm Clarke, played by Noel Trevarthen, made his first appearance on 23 November 1987 and departed on 25 November 1988. Malcolm is characterised as an unreliable father and a loner who unwilling to adapt to family life. Malcolm had previously been married to Eileen Clarke (Myra De Groot) and they had a son, Des (Paul Keane). In their backstory, it details that Malcolm left Eileen and had another child Sally Wells (Rowena Mohr) and again abandoned his family. Writers explored this by introducing Sally into the series in search of her father which concluded with his arrival in Erinsborough. Mohr has revealed Malcolm did not know that Sally existed because her mother Kate had kept her pregnancy a secret. Writers had recently introcued Sally into the series and she was concealing her true identity while working in a coffee shop. Mohr explained that Sally was "underhanded" but wanted to find her father. She lies to Des, but when he learns the truth and that she wants to track down Malcolm, "he doesn't want to know". Sally successfully locates Malcom and arranges a family reunion.

Trevarthen told Coral O'Connor writing for the Daily Mirror that "he is not a reliable bloke. Malcolm is a carpenter. A very ordinary bloke who wants to be alone. He doesn't want to see his son and grandson, but gets pushed into it when his daughter comes looking for him." Malcolm later reunites with Eileen and they agree to remarry. Patrice Fidgeon from TV Week reported that their wedding would not happen because of Eileen's "overbearing" ways. On-screen Eileen is so fixated on conducting the wedding her way that Malcolm changes his mind. The story ended with Malcolm abandoning his family once again as he jilts Eileen.

Malcolm is Des' estranged father. He arrives after his daughter, Sally tracks him down. Des and his mother, Eileen are reluctant to see him as he abandoned them early in Des' life. After some initial frostiness, Malcolm woos Eileen successfully and she agrees to give him a second chance and they decide to remarry. However, Malcolm jilts Eileen on their wedding day and she has a breakdown. Malcolm, racked with guilt then gives Eileen tickets he wins on a television quiz show for a holiday in Europe. He returns to Erinsborough several months later with a new girlfriend, Leanne Sterling (May Lloyd) and reveals he has sold his house in order to fund her expensive tastes and asks Des to pretend his house is Malcolm's. Leanne is far more interested in Des and constantly flirts with him and denies it to Malcolm. Eventually, Des exposes the lies and Leanne leaves. Malcolm leaves to tour Australia after Des wins him a caravan in a game show.

== Tony Romeo ==
Tony Romeo
- Neighbours character
- Portrayed by: Nick Carrafa
- Duration: 1987–1988
- First appearance: 25 November 1987
- Last appearance: 15 April 1988
- Introduced by: Reg Watson
In-universe information
- Occupation: Mechanic
- Mother: Elinora Romeo

Antonio "Tony" Romeo, played by Nick Carrafa, made his first appearance on 25 November 1987. Carrafa previously made a guest appearance in a 1985 episode, as Danny Ramsay's (David Clencie) biological father Tim Duncan in a flashback sequence. Carrafa told Coral O'Connor from the Daily Mirror that he hoped viewers would not recognise him as Tim because "it was a very small part." Carrafa joined Neighbours shortly after he finished filming his role in the film Hungry Heart. Tony was Carrafa's first on-going role in a television series. He was also the first regular male ethnic character on the show. Carrafa did not think the writers would consciously treat him as "the only Italian in the show".

Tony is introduced as the new manager of the local garage taking over from Greg Cooper (Alan Fletcher). Tony is portrayed as a "sex mad mechanic" and Carrafa disliked this characteristic. He explained to O'Connor that "Tony is a headstrong bully and a womaniser. He tries to have an affair with every girl he meets." Tony is also a love rival of Henry Ramsay (Craig McLachlan) who fight over Sally Wells (Rowena Mohr). Henry is dating Sally and is angry when he witnesses Tony flirting with Sally. Carrafa told Mark Foster from Neighbours Who's Who that "Henry comes over claiming that Sally is his girl and Tony and Henry have a fist-fight in front of Lassiters. Tony finds out Henry and Sally aren't a 'unit' and he decides to ask her out. So he's still in there with a chance." To celebrate the 20th anniversary of Neighbours, the BBC asked readers to nominate their twenty favourite obscure characters. Tony came in sixth place and a reader said "Ro-may-oh". I can't remember anything else about the man apart from his name, and the way he pronounced it". Coral O'Connor from Daily Mirror branded Tony "a real randy romeo", "tough mechanic" and a "womanising bully".

Tony arrives in Erinsborough after many years away and asks Jim Robinson (Alan Dale) for a job at his garage after hearing from his friend Greg about the place. He quickly offends Jim's daughter in-law Charlene (Kylie Minogue) by flirting with her then flirts with Sally who is dating Charlene's brother, Henry. Henry, annoyed, confronts Tony but is pushed into Lassiter's pond after Tony quickly subdues him with Karate moves. In spite of this, Tony and Henry become good friends.

In order to avoid an arranged marriage, his mother Elinora (Kate Jason) has organised for him, Tony writes a letter saying he has met someone else and persuades Jane Harris (Annie Jones) to take a photo with him in order to get his family off his back. However, problems multiply when Elinora flies to Erinsborough to meet Jane. The lie further snowballs when Jane opts out of Tony's scheme and he tells Elinora that Jane is bed-ridden with chicken pox and that Sally is Jane's sister. Eventually the truth is revealed and after a reading of tea leaves by Nell Mangel (Vivean Gray) which reveals that Tony's marriage to Angela, his intended bride, would be a disaster, Elinora leaves, giving him her blessing.

Tony invites Sally to move in but it is a disaster as Tony is untidy and refuses to do any housework. They ask their landlord Mr. Phillips (Earl Francis) to do some alterations and he agrees but at a price; a rent hike. They involve several of their friends in a painting party which is successful. Tony continues to pursue Jane but she is still wrestling with her feelings for Mike Young (Guy Pearce) and continues to try to win her over. Tony then becomes depressed when he sees he is getting nowhere with Jane and decides to leave Erinsborough before quitting the garage. Before his departure, he learns of his father suffering a potentially fatal stroke and decides to join him in Perth.

== Others ==
Date(s)	Character	Actor	Circumstances
12–15 January	Ralph Drew	William Upjohn	A man who pretends to be a Reverend under the name Errol Price. He meets Helen Daniels and tells that he worked at the prison where Terry Inglis was incarcerated, and explains how he felt when she committed suicide. Ralph asks Helen to take him to Terry's grave and he later kidnaps her. Helen's grandson Paul Robinson soon becomes suspicious as he has already met the real Errol Price who is on holiday. Paul asks Shane Ramsay to follow Ralph and he and Charlene Mitchell track him down to the cemetery where they find him holding Helen captive with the intent to kill her. Ralph tries to flee, but Charlene knocks him out with a shovel. It is revealed that Ralph is a former boyfriend of Terry's, who suffers with mental health problems, and blames Paul for Terry's death. Ralph is then arrested.
3–10 February	Gerard Singer	Bryan Marshall	Rosemary Daniels's fiancé. Gerard has an affair with Rosemary's mother Helen Daniels, after they discover they have a lot in common. Unable to continue deceiving Rosemary, who is excited over wedding plans, Gerard calls off the engagement. Helen finishes the affair with Gerard, but the truth is revealed when Rosemary finds the letters from Gerard to Helen.
23 February 1987 – 23 August 1988	Derek Morris	Noel Hodda	A journalist who enrages Paul Robinson by digging for information on his past with Terry Inglis, for his magazine Disclosure. He then talks to Paul's neighbour, Nell Mangel who reveals the truth about the relationship between Paul and his secretary Susan Cole. Rosemary Daniels, after failing to buy Derek's silence, buys out the magazine and is forced to hire Derek for the New York division of the Daniels Corporation. Derek returns as a troubleshooter at Lassiter's and quickly begins throwing his weight around by suspending Paul and sacking Henry Ramsay and his mother Madge Bishop. He then makes advances towards Jane Harris and agrees to reinstate Paul if she goes out on a date with him. As days pass, Derek quickly becomes unpopular with the staff and many customers of the complex. He tells Des Clarke he will be terminating the lease of the Coffee Shop. Mike Young and Scott Robinson confront Derek when he begins harassing Jane again. Mike is unable to retaliate against Derek on a Good behaviour bond but Scott punches Derek and as a result he fires Jane and bans Scott and Mike from the premises. A strike is staged in protest and Paul's wife, Gail quickly discovers Derek is a mole from a rival organisation and he leaves after being exposed and Paul is reinstated as manager.
25–26 February	Parnell	Gerard Maguire	Parnell is a bank robber who targets Des Clarke, the manager of the pacific bank. He tells his associate Brody to hold Des' pregnant wife Daphne hostage as insurance while he robs the bank. When the police descend on Ramsay Street, Brody panics and threatens to shoot Daphne. Scott Robinson, Mike Young and Eileen Clarke arrive and Brody tries to escape but Eileen and Scott subdue him and he is arrested. Parnell's getaway driver, Wheels takes Des to the bank where he empties the safe and knocks him unconscious. Wheels tries to flee but he is foiled by his former cellmate, Henry Ramsay who seizes the money and Parnell gives chase. Henry then throws the money into a pond and he and Parnell fight just before the police arrive and arrest Parnell.
25–27 February	Brody	Richard Moss	
25–27 February	Wheels	Scott Lucey	
17 March–1 April	Dean Bartholomew	Burt Cooper	The head chef at Lassiter's. He has a difficult relationship with head of housekeeping, Nell Mangel but is quick to defend her when Paul Robinson sacks her. He then stages a strike until Nell is reinstated. Paul is forced to hire his friends and family as temporary staff when the hotel undergoes inspection. Dean turns up but is locked in the pantry to prevent him from revealing the truth. When he is released, he threatens to inform his friend, the hotel inspector Bernard Elliot of everything. However, Dean praises the hotel when he meets with Bernard and Lassiter's passes the inspection.
20 March–5 May	Ivan	Nick Antipos	Ivan arrives at Number 24 Ramsay Street demanding money from Henry Ramsay after betting on the Ramsay Street Olympics which ends in a tie. He threatens Henry but his mother Madge writes Ivan an I.O.U. and promises Ivan will get his money. Ivan later gets into an argument with Harold Bishop during a bucks party but the situation is quickly diffused by Jeremy Lord.
30 March–1 April	Bernard Elliott	Ric Hutton	A hotel inspector who arrives at Lassiter's hotel as part of a travel agents' convention staying at Lassiter's. Paul Robinson is eager for Bernard's opinion in order to raise the hotel's rating. Bernard wants to see his old friend Dean Bartholomew who works at the hotel as a chef but has currently gone on strike unbeknownst to him. However, a cover story is invented that Dean has been called away. Bernard and Dean eventually meet with the latter singing the praises of the hotel, resulting in a glowing review.
6 April–17 October	Allen Lawrence	Neil Fitzpatrick	The estranged father of Daphne Clarke. Daphne's husband, Des Clarke invites him to dinner, which does not sit well with Daphne, who is still bitter at Alan for being cold and distant when she was growing up. Daphne also blames Allen for driving away a former boyfriend, who later died in a car accident and initially wants to nothing to with him. After a talk with Des, Daphne agrees to see Allen. However, things quickly go sour when Allen expresses disappointment that Daphne's unborn baby could potentially be a female, upsetting Daphne. Several months later, Daphne learns from her mother, Tina Bentley that Allen is dying and she urges her to make peace with him, which Daphne does. Allen reveals that he has changed his will to leave everything to Daphne, and she leaves to take care of him in his final months, taking her son Jamie Clarke with her. Allen dies the following year.
13–15 April	Christine Wilton	Kerry McGuire	Christine is an art critic who arrives in Erinsborough in order to view a portrait painted by Helen Daniels and stays at Lassiter's hotel. Henry Ramsay is attracted to Christine and he helps her move her things into her room. When Henry pours some champagne for him and Christine, he is soaked and removes his shirt. Christine's husband, Dennis arrives and assumes they are having an affair. Christine and Dennis argue and Henry falls asleep. Christine then meets Helen and sees her paintings and upsets her with her criticism. However, Dennis agrees to buy one of Helen's portraits. The Wiltons have lunch with Helen before returning to the United States.
13–15 April	Dennis Wilton	Randall Berger	
30 April–26 May	Jeremy Lord	Tim Elston	Jeremy is Gail Lewis' ex-husband. They divorced shortly after Gail's adoptive mother, Brenda died. Jeremy reappears in Gail's life wanting to reconcile with her, causing Paul Robinson to feel jealous. Jeremy and Gail reunite and he proposes. Jeremy races his old car Number 13, which is perceived to be unlucky and despite Gail's protests, he races the car but goes too fast and ends up crashing, resulting in his death.
18–21 April	Greg Davis	Alex Papps	A former schoolmate of Charlene Mitchell and Scott Robinson who previously dropped out of Erinsborough High. He and a friend stash some flammable equipment under Charlene's caravan at Lassiter's while they plan their next school arson attack. When Greg tries to retrieve the equipment, he knocks over the petrol can while Charlene and Scott are having a barbecue and a fire is caused as a result, and Charlene is injured. Scott and his brother Paul Robinson tackle Greg, who tries to flee and he confesses to starting several school fires.
19 May–28 July 1987, 25 April–9 August 1988, 25 July–21 November 1991	Emma Gordon	Tamsin West	Lucy Robinson's best friend. They fall out when Emma decides to go to another girl's barbecue instead of Lucy's party due to Lucy's recent stuck-up behaviour after returning home from holiday but reconcile. When Lucy leaves for boarding school, Emma begins hanging around with Todd Landers who shows a romantic interest in her but he is too young for her and she prefers the older Nick Page, however, Nick is not interested in her. Several years later, while on a break from his relationship with Cody Willis, Todd asks Emma out and they date for a while. Cody catches them kissing and Todd admits to Emma, he is still in love with Cody and she is unimpressed. She later dates Josh Anderson after he gives her some earrings but she is annoyed when she discovers he previously gave them to Lucy who rejected them. Emma's friendship with Lucy comes to an end when Lucy takes credit for Emma's winning advertising campaign for a job interview after the entries are mixed up.
26–27 May	Meredith Lord	Terrie Waddell	Jeremy Lord's wife. She arrives at Number 22 Ramsay Street in search of her husband only to be greeted by Jeremy's ex-wife, Gail Lewis who tells her of Jeremy's death in an accident involving his old racecar. Gail is about to reveal the truth about Jeremy's double life but Paul Robinson stops her. Gail lies to Meredith that Jeremy only talked about her. Meredith reveals she is pregnant and stays with Gail before leaving for Brisbane to bury Jeremy.
29 May 1987 – 6 April 1989	Reverend Sampson	Howard Bell	The local vicar at St. Stephen's church. He makes friends with regular churchgoers Harold Bishop, Eileen Clarke and Nell Mangel. Sampson conducts the weddings of Scott Robinson and Charlene Mitchell, Harold and Madge Ramsay, and Nell and John Worthington. He also presides over the christening of Jamie Clarke. Sampson later attends Nell and John's farewell celebrations. He later moves to another Parish and is succeeded by the younger Craig Richards.
13 July 1987 – 5 April 1988	Crystal Marker	Jayne Healey	Crystal is a former flame of Paul Robinson. When Crystal and Paul kiss, it is witnessed by Paul's sister Lucy, who is upset as she believes Gail Lewis, who Paul is married to for the sake of a business deal, is a better match. However, Paul explains things and he and Gail keep up the ruse. Several months later, Crystal returns to find Paul and Gail are now a real couple. Crystal meets Lou Carpenter and they begin flirting with each other at the pub, which is witnessed by Madge Ramsay who realises Lou is not the right man to marry.
4–12 August	Megan Downey	Michelle O'Grady	Mike Young's girlfriend, who he meets in Canberra. After spending several days talking on the phone, Megan eventually visits Mike in Erinsborough. Mike's former girlfriend Jane Harris is visibly uncomfortable seeing Mike and Megan together, as she still has feelings for Mike. Megan is irritated by Mike's dedication to his legal guardians Des and Daphne Clarke and their new baby. She tries to convince Mike to move out of his home in Ramsay Street and into a flat with her, but her selfish attitude puts him off and Megan returns to Canberra alone.
5–6 August	Debbie Morris	Andrea Blaski	Henry Ramsay meets Debbie when she is upset after reading a break-up letter from her boyfriend, Andrew. Henry buys Debbie a coffee and they get along. However, when Andrew reappears, Debbie runs straight into his arms and they reconcile, much to Henry's disappointment. The character was originally intended to be played by Fiona Coote, but she had to back out of filming at the last minute.
5 August 1987–4 October 1989	Margaret	Danver Mockson	Beverly Marshall's receptionist at the surgery. When Jonathan Whiting collapses in the surgery, she calls the ambulance. Paul Robinson, Beverly's stepson tries to bribe Margaret into revealing the whereabouts of his estranged wife Gail following their separation but she refuses.
24 August	Graham Baxter	Chris Waters	A business partner of Amanda Harris' husband, Peter. He demands money from her which she has taken from Peter's business, which Amanda refuses to hand over. Amanda then threatens to implicate Peter for failing to declare the money. Graham mentions that Peter has contacts who will find her and Amanda agrees to meet Graham outside the Waterhole pub then asks Henry Ramsay and Scott Robinson to meet her at the pub. Amanda then refuses to hand the money over and pretends that Graham is hassling her and Henry manages to scare him away.
27 August	Karen Armstrong	Gael Andrews	The wife of Stephen Armstrong. She blames Beverly Marshall for their breakup and pours a glass of wine over her head.
8–25 September	Rick Hansen	Dominic McDonald	Rick meets Lucy Robinson when she recovers in hospital from an operation to remove a brain tumour, her doctor. Rick and Lucy get along well due to being the same age. Lucy falls for Rick but she annoys him when she asks him he is worried about dying. He then apologises for losing his temper and they agree to put it behind him. When Lucy visits Rick after they make up, she is shocked to find the nurses stripping his sheets and talking about how they will miss him, she assumes he has died but it is revealed he has been discharged and Lucy spends the school holidays with him in the countryside.
14–28 September	Stephen Armstrong	Peter Adams	Beverly Marshall's ex-boyfriend. They broke up when he began hitting her. He reappears in Beverly's life and she chooses him over Jim Robinson and they move in together. However, Stephen quickly reverts to his old ways and Beverly throws him out.
21–30 September	B.B. Larkin	Tamasin Ramsay	Kenny Larkin's sister, who Kenny brings to the Waterhole in a scheme to hustle Henry Ramsay by pretending Kenny is injured and that she is a terrible darts player. However, B.B. easily beats Henry's team and it is revealed B.B. is short for "Bullseye Brenda", as she is such a good player. She apologises to Henry the next day for the scheme. They quickly become friends and Henry moves in with Kenny and B.B. for a while. After another of Kenny's schemes nearly gets Henry fired, B.B. vouches for Henry to his boss Paul Robinson, exonerating him.
23 September 1987 – 7 May 1989	Glen Matheson	Richard Moss	A pilot friend of Gail Lewis's from her days as a stewardess. They catch up over lunch and there is a spark between them. Paul Robinson, who is married to Gail for the sake of a business deal feels jealous. Glen feels put off when Gail constantly talks about Paul and leaves realising she loves him for real. However, when Glen returns Gail is eager to see him and they begin spending more and more time together. Helen Daniels witnesses Glen kissing Gail goodbye but Gail tells her she loves Paul. When Gail is about to leave Paul, Glen tries to make her see sense. Glen later dates Jane Harris, who is considerably younger than him much to the chagrin of her grandmother, Nell Mangel but the relationship quickly fizzles out. Glen later helps Jane's uncle, Joe Mangel conquer his fear of flying.
25–29 September	Tina Bentley	Beverley Dunn	Daphne Clarke's estranged mother. She arrives for her grandson Jamie Clarke's christening and sits at the back of the church without Daphne noticing. When she arrives at Number 28, Daphne soon recognises Tina. The reunion is frosty as Tina had walked out on Daphne when she was a teenager. Tina reveals she is remarrying and moving to New Zealand and wants to see Daphne and Jamie before she leaves. Daphne eventually softens when Tina reveals her ex-husband, Daphne's father Allen Lawrence is dying. The women make up before Tina leaves.
2 October 1987 – 9 March 1988	Mr. Griffiths	Steve Payne	Mr. Griffiths brings his old mini to the garage for parts. Rob Lewis rejects it, but Charlene Mitchell shows an interest. She buys the car for $20 and names it Willie. Charlene later contacts Griffiths when she finds a rare valuable coin inside Willie.
3–11 November	Chrissie Adams	Sheryl Munks	The goddaughter of Helen Daniels' friend Frank Darcy. She encourages Helen's granddaughter, Lucy Robinson to wear makeup. Chrissie makes a play for Lucy's brother Scott, unaware he is going through marital difficulties and exacerbates the situation by suggesting Scott is keen on her in front of his wife Charlene. She then tries to help Lucy win the affections of neighbour Mike Young by giving her a makeover but the result is disastrous when Mike laughs at her. Chrissie causes further trouble when she learns Greg Cooper was responsible for the death of someone and begins trying to convince people he is a murderer. Greg is furious, prompting Chrissie to fear for her life. Jim Robinson explains that Greg caused his brother's death in a boxing match, leaving Chrissie to feel bad for starting the rumours. Helen then sends Chrissie home.
