= Gail Robinson (Neighbours) =

Fictional character on the Australian soap opera Neighbours

- Neighbours character
- Portrayed by: Fiona Corke
- Duration: 1987–1989, 2005–2007, 2019
- First appearance: 11 March 1987
- Last appearance: 16 September 2019
- Introduced by: Reg Watson (1987); Ric Pellizerri (2005); Jason Herbison (2019)
In-universe information
- Other names: Gail Lewis
- Occupation: The Daniels Corporation assistant manager; Manager of Lassiter's Hotel; Garden nursery owner
- Family: Robinson
- Father: Ian Chadwick
- Mother: Louise Hampstead
- Adoptive father: Rob Lewis
- Adoptive mother: Brenda Lewis
- Husband: Jeremy Lord (backstory); Paul Robinson (1987–1989)
- Sons: Robert Robinson; Cameron Robinson
- Daughters: Elle Robinson
- Granddaughters: Harlow Robinson

Gail Lewis (also Robinson) is a fictional character from the Australian soap opera Neighbours, played by Fiona Corke. She made her first screen appearance during the episode broadcast on 11 March 1987. Corke left the role in 1989, but made appearances in 2005, 2006 and 2007. She reprised the role in 2019, as Gail returns to Erinsborough to meet her granddaughter.

== Casting ==
Corke first appeared in Neighbours in 1987. She described her time on the show as "an amazing experience" and added "It was so full on and so huge you didn't know if you were an actor or in a pop group half the time." In 1988, Corke became one of ten actors from the show who were flown to London to perform in front of the Queen at the Royal Variety Performance.

== Development ==
=== Introduction and marriage ===
Gail was introduced alongside her father Rob Lewis (Ernie Bourne). They move to Erinsborough and Gail becomes reacquainted with Paul Robinson (Stefan Dennis), who she worked with when they were both flight attendants. Neil Wallis and Dave Hogan of The Neighbours Factfile said both Gail and Paul had become "talented ambitious high-flyers in business" in the intervening years. Gail is shown to be intelligent and a university graduate. Gail becomes Paul's number two at the Daniels Corporation. She puts her work first in order to "blot out" her private life and a failed marriage to racing driver Jeremy Lord (Tim Elston).

Producers created a marriage of convenience story for Gail and Paul. They decide to get married in order to trick Japanese businessman, Mr Udagawa (Lawrence Mah) and secure a business deal with him. Mr Udagawa believes marriage is a favourable indication of a man's judgement, and Gail quickly agrees to Paul's suggestion. They are married in the living room of Number 22 Ramsay Street in front of their families. Paul claims that they wanted something simple as they have both been married before. The plan works and Mr Udagawa awards them the contract, forcing them to work long hours together. Josephine Monroe wrote in her book The Neighbours Programme Guide: "sadly their dedication was only to their work."

=== Departure ===
In early December 1988, David Brown of TV Week reported that Corke had decided to leave Neighbours, after she felt that it was time to move on. The news came shortly after her partner Nick Carrafa (Tony Romeo) also left the serial. Corke left the show in August 1989. She said that she wanted to experience life outside of the show, commenting: "I love Neighbours and I've had a ball, but it's time to move on." Corke later told Sue Larkin of the Aberdeen Press and Journal that quitting the show was a hard decision, but she did not want to be in it forever. She continued, "I decided to take a few risks, have a look round and see if I could do something else." Corke also told Larkin that the producers did not want to let her go. She had previously made "noises" about leaving six months earlier and they asked her to stay for longer, which she did. She said "This time I meant it, though. In an situation like that, you can go on and on helping people out and end up staying for years."

The producers and writers were surprised by Corke's decision, but immediately began planning how Gail would exit. Ideas included a fatal car accident, a disappearance, or a marriage break up. They favoured the latter option. As Brown had reported that Dennis was staying with the show, he predicted that Paul and Gail's marriage would come to an end in the new year. After Rob is killed in a car accident, Gail partly blames Paul. The couple's marriage is strained further when Paul leaves the funeral for a business meeting. Corke commented, "that was just it for Gail, she couldn't take any more." Gail, who was seven months pregnant with triplets, realises that she probably will not receive the support from Paul that she needs, so she decides to move to Tasmania. Corke said one of the hardest things about leaving Neighbours was saying goodbye to her friends, including Dennis, who she got on with "fantastically".

=== Return ===
Corke made a cameo appearance, alongside many former cast members, in the serial's 20th anniversary celebration episode "Friends for Twenty Years". In January 2006, a reporter for Inside Soap confirmed Corke would be reprising the role for a guest stint later that year. Gail returns to Erinsborough in June, almost twenty years after she departed, for her children. Gail and Paul "face the terrible reality" that their son Robert Robinson (Adam Hunter) is a killer. Corke said that the triplets have been everything to Gail. Although she had a long-term relationship with a man in Tasmania, her life has been her children and her plant nursery business. Corke explained, "now she is so overcome by what's happened to her kids. At first, she is angry with Paul. She has brought these three kids up on her own, with no help from him, and they have been perfectly happy and healthy. Then as soon as they start staying with their Dad, everything goes wrong! Gail's really on her guard now." Paul's partner Izzy Hoyland (Natalie Bassingthwaighte) later brands Gail a bad mother and tells her she is in denial. At the same time, Paul is wondering whether he still loves Gail. Dennis thought that the former couple loved each other deeply, but they were refusing to acknowledge it due to the animosity between them. Corke also thought there was something unresolved between Gail and Paul, adding "the thing with Gail is that she's someone who doesn't declare her emotions easily".

Producers created a second sham wedding story for Gail and Paul, who hold the ceremony with the hope of drawing Robert out of hiding. Paul's partner Izzy comes up with the sham wedding idea in jest, but they decide to go ahead with it to help the police capture Robert. Dennis told Jason Herbison from Inside Soap that Robert's goal is to destroy Paul and having a publicised wedding provides Robert with an opportunity to get at Paul. He added "they're only pretending of course, so the marriage isn't binding."

Writers played on the fact Gail and Paul still share romantic feelings. Dennis explained that "the chemistry between Paul and Gail is still there, so the idea of them pretending to wed again is genius. Everyone's wondering if they've really fallen for each other. That's been the greatest thing about this storyline - you just never know. When we were filming it, we didn't even know ourselves!" When the wedding takes place, Gail and Paul say their vows and sound too convincing. Dennis added "it's almost as if he and Gail have to pull themselves up and remember what the day is actually about." When Robert fails to show, Paul shouts out load to get his attention and Robert shoots Paul in front of Gail. Following this, Robert gives himself up to the police and is arrested.

=== Further returns (2007, 2019) ===
Corke returned for a short guest stint in 2007. In December 2009, Stefan Dennis called for the return of Gail. He said "I'd like to see Fiona Corke come back, even for another guest role, because she's just adorable and fun to work with. And she's got every right to come back because she's still got a tie with Paul's children."

Corke reprised the role on 21 August 2019, as Gail returns to Erinsborough to get to know her granddaughter Harlow Robinson (Jemma Donovan). After breaking up a catfight between Harlow and Roxy Willis (Zima Anderson), Gail voices her concerns about Harlow living with Paul and his fiancée Terese Willis (Rebekah Elmaloglou). She later admits to Paul that she blames him for the loss of their sons, and warns Terese not to marry him, leaving Terese to question whether Gail wants Paul back.

== Storylines ==
=== 1987–1989 ===
Gail applies for the job at the Daniels Corporation and moves to Ramsay Street with her adoptive father Rob Lewis. She meets Paul Robinson again, and it emerges that they had a brief romance while they worked as air stewards. Paul gives Gail the job and they begin working alongside each other. Her former husband Jeremy Lord arrives in Erinsborough in the hope that Gail will take him back and proposes to her again, but he is killed in a racing car accident. As Gail deals with her grief, she discovers that Jeremy was already married when his widow, Meredith (Terrie Waddell) arrives and reveals she is pregnant with his child. Gail and Paul kiss after signing a business deal, but Paul quickly pulls away and apologises. When Paul realises that Japanese businessman, Mr Udagawa, prefers dealing with family men, Paul asks Gail to enter into a marriage of convenience. They fool their friends and family with their fake marriage and they slowly begin to fall for each other. When her friend Glen Matheson (Richard Moss) calls out of the blue and invites her to lunch, Gail jumps at the chance to meet him. Throughout the dinner, Gail can only talk about Paul and Glen realises that she was clearly in love him. When Gail meets up with Glen again, it follows an argument with Paul. She reveals the truth about the marriage to Glen. Gail kisses Glen goodbye and it is witnessed by Paul's grandmother Helen Daniels (Anne Haddy) who confronts Gail and she admits that she loves Paul, which he overhears.

Gail leaves for a business trip and on her return she tells Paul that they have no future and she wants a divorce. Although they had separated, Gail and Paul agree they make a good team at the Daniels Corporation and remain working together. But the tension between them quickly becomes unbearable and Gail resigns. She decided to leave for New York, but just before she is about to leave she says her goodbyes to everyone and Paul tells her he loves her. Gail agrees to stay in Erinsborough. Paul and Gail affirm their love and commitment for each other properly by renewing their wedding vows on Valentine's Day alongside Paul's father Jim (Alan Dale) and Beverly Marshall (Lisa Armitage). Gail and Paul want to start a family, but Gail discovers she is infertile. They then begin making plans to begin IVF treatment. During this time Paul discovers that he had fathered a child, Amy (Nicolette Minster), with Nina Williams (Leigh Morgan). Gail fears Paul will no longer want to have children with her, but she is proved wrong and Gail becomes pregnant with triplets. The prospect of becoming a mother leads Gail to track down her real parents. She discovers that her real mother Louise Hampstead has died, but finds her biological father, Ian Chadwick (Robin Bowering). Rob is jealous of Ian's presence but soon accepts it.

Rob is involved in a fatal car crash and dies and the blame falls on Paul. Gail learns the two had been engaged in a vicious argument where Paul accused Rob of dealing in stolen car parts, and Rob had stormed off in a rage, culminating in the car accident. Thus, Gail holds Paul responsible for her father's death. After the funeral Gail leaves a note for Paul and told him that she was leaving. Soon after arriving in Tasmania, she gives birth to Robert, Cameron (Adam Hunter) and Lucinda (Pippa Black). Paul flies out to see his children and attempts a reconciliation with Gail, but she is adamant the marriage is over. The couple agree to remain friends.

=== 2005–2019 ===
Gail returns to Erinsborough again when she receives the news that Robert was put into a coma by Cameron. However, it turns out that Robert had actually put Cameron in a coma before assuming his identity and joining Elle and Paul in Erinsborough. Robert plots to destroy his father and everyone who meant anything to him. Gail's feelings for Paul resurface and Paul insists that she stay at No.22. After visiting Rob's grave, Gail kisses Paul. Robert kidnaps Paul and left him trapped in a mineshaft. Gail, Paul's partner Izzy Hoyland and Elle find Paul and rescue him. Paul and Gail then concoct a plan to get married again to lure Robert out of hiding. During the wedding, Gail is touched when Paul speaks from the heart about how blessed he was to have found her again. Robert shows up and shoots Paul. However, Paul is wearing a bulletproof vest and Robert is arrested. Gail returned to Tasmania, leaving Elle and Cameron behind to continue getting to know their father better. Cameron is killed accidentally by Max Hoyland (Stephen Lovatt) and Paul and Elle bring Cameron's body home to Tasmania for burial. Gail blames Paul for effectively costing her her two boys and vows never to speak to him again.

Paul undergoes life-saving surgery to remove a tumour that has been growing on his brain for a number of years and wakes up unable to recall anything that had happened to him since the late 1980s. Gail returns to Erinsborough upon receiving a confused call from Paul declaring his love for her. Gail is sceptical of Paul's memory loss and rejects Elle's pleas to keep the truth from him. Unable to bring herself to hurt him, Gail agrees to go along with Elle's plan and spares Paul from knowing the truth about his past. But Paul overhears Gail and Elle discussing all the pain he has caused people. Gail tells Paul everything and he is stunned as he realises all the things that he had done to his family and friends. When Elle overhears Paul complaining about how he had no feelings for her as a father, she storms off. Gail follows her and tries to persuade her to return to Tasmania, but Elle is determined to make things work with Paul. Gail finds herself being drawn to Paul again and he asks her to give their marriage another go. During a picnic, Gail realises that she cannot forget the past twenty years and she returns to Tasmania.

Gail returns twelve years later, after receiving a call from Paul informing her that they have a granddaughter, Harlow. Gail walks into Number 22 and finds Harlow fighting with Roxy Willis. As they clean up, Gail is introduced to Paul's fiancée Terese Willis and she questions Harlow's living situation. Gail and Harlow have breakfast together, and Harlow asks about her father, Robert, and Gail admits that she visits him a few times a year, but he is currently refusing all visitors. Noticing the continued tension between Harlow and Roxy, Gail worries that it will badly affect Harlow and she tells Paul and Terese that she wants to take Harlow back to Tasmania with her. She blames Paul for the loss of Cameron and Robert, and does not want Harlow to go the same way. Gail changes her mind when she learns that Harlow is doing well in school and wants to stay in Erinsborough. Gail later advises Terese not to marry Paul. While in the cafe, Gail meets Gary Canning (Damien Richardson), who she matched with on tinder, and they go on a couple of dates. Gail later learns Gary has also been on a date with Paul's fifth wife Rebecca Napier (Jane Hall), but unlike Rebecca, she is fine with it as she and Gary are not exclusive. Another of Paul's ex-wives Lyn Scully (Janet Andrewartha) comes to Erinsborough, and Paul confronts Gail about their interference in his relationship with Terese. Gail insists that their arrival is just a coincidence, however, Paul soon learns that Elle asked the wives to persuade Terese not to marry him. Gail stays to look after Harlow while Paul and Terese go on honeymoon, but she soon becomes concerned for Elle, so Harlow books her a flight to New York.

== Reception ==
Sue Larkin of the Aberdeen Press and Journal observed: "As any self-respecting Neighbours fan will know, Gail, the smart, career-woman wife of Paul, is one of the most intriguing characters in the Aussie soap." The BBC said Gail's most notable moment was "Running off with the triplets." Ruth Deller of television website Lowculture said Gail was the "most well-remembered" of Paul's wives. Of Gail and Paul's relationship The Sydney Morning Herald said "we fretted for what seemed like days until Gail Lewis (Fiona Corke) sashayed into Mr R's love zone. We knew from the start that Paul and Gail were star crossed. But who could have predicted that one love's rose could have so many thorns." Gail is referred to in Emily Barr's fictitious novel "Out of My Depth", in which character Amanda is watching Neighbours, with scenes featuring Gail and Paul receiving disapproval from Harold, Amanda opines that she believes the couple are in love. Lorna Cooper from MSN said she "loved" Gail and Paul's romance. In 2006, Jason Herbison from Inside Soap wrote "back in 1987, one of the hottest Ramsay Street storylines involved playboy Paul Robinson and career girl Gail Lewis tying the knot in a cynical marriage of convenience." He added that while their marriage was short lived, the pair "genuinely did fall in love."

Gail was placed at number thirteen on the Huffpost's "35 greatest Neighbours characters of all time" feature. Journalist Adam Beresford described "smart cookie" Gail as "the true love of Paul's life" who is "always welcomed by fans" in her multiple returns. He was also a fan of Gail's fashion sense, stating Gail "served so much high-powered executive realness back in the Eighties that a 'Fiona Corke’s wardrobe by Kamizole' mention was a highlight of the show’s end credits. Iconic."
