= Afraid of the Dark =

Afraid of the Dark may refer to:

- Afraid of the Dark (film), a 1991 French-British drama horror film
- "Afraid of the Dark" (Young Ejecta song), 2013
- "Afraid of the Dark" (Motionless in White song), 2026
- Afraid of the Dark, a 2018 EP by EZI
- "Afraid of the Dark" (Halifax f.p.), an episode of the Australian television series Halifax f.p.

== See also ==
- Fear of the dark
