= Halifax f.p. =

1994 Australian TV series

- Genre: Crime drama Psychological drama Mystery thriller Crime thriller
- Created by: Roger Simpson
- Starring: Rebecca Gibney
- Country of origin: Australia
- Original language: English
- No. of series: 6
- No. of episodes: 21

Production
- Executive producers: Mikael Borglund; Kris Noble; Rainer Mockert
- Producers: Roger Le Mesurier; Roger Simpson
- Production company: Beyond Simpson Le Mesurier

Original release
- Network: Nine Network
- Release: 9 October 1994 –: 7 July 2002

Halifax f.p. is an Australian television crime series produced by Nine Network from 1994 to 2002. The series stars Rebecca Gibney as Doctor Jane Halifax, a forensic psychiatrist (f.p.) investigating cases involving the mental state of suspects or victims. The series is set in Melbourne.

The producers of the film were Beyond Simpson Le Mesurier; Australian Film Finance Corporation and aired on the Nine Network Australia Pty Ltd. The budget for each episode was an average of AU$1.3 million. Funding came in part from the Australian Film Finance Corporation and Film Victoria.

The show was a set of 21 stand-alone television films, spread over six series. Each was between 90 and 120 minutes long, with a new "episode" airing roughly every few months during its eight-year run. The series aired in more than 60 countries. In August–October 2020, a short weekly revival of the series, called Halifax: Retribution, was also aired.

== Cast ==
=== Main ===
- Rebecca Gibney as Dr Jane Halifax

=== Recurring ===
- Robyn Nevin as Angela Halifax
- Steve Bisley as Jonah Cole
- David Roberts as Detective Brett Murray
- Susanne Chapman as Georgia / Jane's Receptionist
- Gerald Lepkowski as Ari

=== Guests ===
- Aaron Blabey as Tony Lobianco
- Adrian Wright as David Onslow
- Alan Cassell as Doctor Wallace
- Alicia Banit as Young Jane
- Amanda Douge as Lauren Hayward
- Andrew Blackman as Stephen Audrey
- Andrew Clarke as Gary Preston
- Andrew McFarlane as Owen Toser
- Andrew McKaige as Tim McNamara
- Andy Anderson as Laurie Downes
- Angela Punch McGregor as Anthea
- Annie Jones as Alison Hart
- Belinda McClory as Paula Kingsley
- Ben Mendelsohn as Peter Donaldson
- Bernard Curry as Adam Lawler
- Beth Buchanan as Denise Crow
- Brett Climo as Danny
- Brett Swain as Lauper
- Brett Tucker as Scott Lovejoy
- Bruce Hughes as Ian Turner
- Bruce Spence as Eric Washburn
- Bryan Marshall as John Halifax, Jane's Father
- Cameron Nugent as Kevin Witherspoon
- Caroline Gillmer as Roseanne
- Catherine Wilkin as Erica Chatwin / Marion Walters
- Christopher Milne as Harry
- Clodagh Crowe as Detective Snr Constable Sylvia Manganaris
- Colin Friels as Police Officer Kevin Tait
- Damian Walshe-Howling as Scott Brennan
- Damien Fotiou as Michael Slevic
- Daniela Farinacci as Detective Koslinksi
- Danielle Carter as Stevie
- Danny Adcock as Athol Callaghan
- David Tredinnick as David Neilson / Gautama
- Deborra-Lee Furness as Brigit Grant
- Dee Smart as Fiona Calwell
- Dino Marnika as Carl Sankovic / Joe
- Doris Younane as Emma Ford
- Emily Browning as Kristy O’Connor
- Essie Davis as Alison Blount
- Fiona Corke as Christine / Lisa McNamara
- Frances O'Connor as Frances
- Frankie J. Holden as Detective Leo Birse
- Garry McDonald as Alex Goodson
- Gary Day as Sergeant Mick Snow
- Gemma Bishop as Samantha Anderson (1 episode)
- Grant Bowler as Detective Bob Palance
- Grant Piro as Terry Lansdown
- Greg Stone as Detective Leon Finke
- Guy Pearce as Daniel Viney & Richard Viney
- Hugh Jackman as Detective Eric Ringer
- Hugo Weaving as Detective Sgt. Tom Hurkos
- Ian Bliss as Garry
- Jacqueline McKenzie as Sharon Sinclair
- Jane Allsop as Lauper's girlfriend
- Jane Hall as Linda Ellis
- Jason Clarke as Detective
- Jeremy Callaghan as Alex, Jane's lover
- John Atkinson as Reporter
- John Walton as Kaz
- Julieanne Newbould as Margaret Masters
- Kate Keltie as Michelle
- Kerry Armstrong as Fiona Holmes
- Kick Gurry as Luke
- Lewis Fiander as Oliver Crowley
- Louise Siversen as Linda Quinn / Beth Hartley
- Mark Hennessy as Kovacs
- Marnie Reece-Wilmore as Annabel Colless
- Marshall Napier as Dr Dale Counahan
- Marta Dusseldorp as Glenys Lund
- Marton Csokas as John Garth
- Mary Docker as Elly
- Matthew Dyktynski as Detective Richard Petty
- Max Phipps as Detective Inspector Derrida
- Michael Veitch as Doctor Baker
- Monica Maughan as Miss Morris / Mrs Hunter
- Neil Melville as Phillip Parker / Jim Dettmann
- Nell Feeney as Maureen O’Connor
- Nicholas Bell as Barry
- Nicholas Eadie as Ian Moffat / Ian Laser
- Nick Carrafa as Homicide Detective #1 / Alan Howard
- Paul Sonkkila as Bartlett
- Peter Adams as Peter O'Hare, Premier of Victoria
- Peter Hardy as Police Officer Tony Roman
- Peter Hosking as Foucault
- Peter Kowitz as Matthew Erhmann
- Peter O'Brien as Steve Elliot
- Petra Yared as Alicia Polk
- Radha Mitchell as Sarah
- Rhondda Findleton as Detective Grace Lord
- Richard Cawthorne as Gary Groom
- Richard Roxburgh as Sergeant Paul Santos
- Robert Hughes as Craig West, TV Presenter
- Robert van Mackelenberg as Dr. David King
- Sacha Horler as Karen Oldfield
- Samuel Johnson as Jamie Callen
- Shane Connor as Ray
- Simon Westaway as Jon Knight
- Sonia Todd as Detective Helen Hunt
- Sophie Lee as Corri Neale
- Steve Jacobs as William
- Steven Vidler as Steve Kingsley
- Sue Jones as Nicki Onslow
- Sullivan Stapleton as Hamish
- Susan Lyons as Detective Helen de Castro
- Terry Serio as Detective Harry Davenport
- Tim Robertson as Joe Mandle, Police Officer
- Tony Barry as Bob 'Dizzy' Gillespie
- Troy Beckwith as Rob Pringle
- Veronica Lang as Cheryl Daleford
- Wayne Hope as Brooke Gibson
- Wendy Strehlow as Carol Witherspoon
- William McInnes as Jeremy Buckle

== Background ==
The series follows the career of Dr. Jane Halifax (Rebecca Gibney), a forensic psychiatrist. Her qualifications in the series are listed as MBBS (Melb.) and FRANZCP. Halifax is Melbourne-based and is shown living at Jensen House on Swanston Street opposite the State Library of Victoria. Her offices are shown as located in Causeway House on Little Collins Street. An only child, her mother, Angela Halifax (Robyn Nevin), lives alone, and her deceased father, John Halifax (1935–1991), was a barrister who enjoyed magic as a hobby.

In episodes 1-7 and 9, she owns and drives a Jaguar Mark 2 (although she drives a modern convertible in episode 8 and later a Saab 900 NG). In episode 1, a book she wrote as an undergraduate (The Preppie Rapist) is mentioned in a court case where she appears as an expert. In episode 5, Halifax mentions returning from a stint in the US helping out the FBI. In episode 6, it is mentioned that she was 'burnt' by a relationship she had with a married professor while studying in the US. In episode 16, Halifax undergoes a colposcopy and a cone biopsy due do abnormal cell growth (a medical issue common in her father's family).

== Episodes ==
=== Series overview ===
Series	Episodes	Originally released	
Series	Episodes	First released	Last released
1	6	9 November 1994	19 July 1995
2	3	14 February 1996	11 September 1996
3	3	19 October 1997	6 September 1998
4	3	27 June 1999	26 September 1999
5	3	11 June 2000	5 November 2000
6	3	21 October 2001	7 July 2002

Telemovies listed chronologically by series, with release dates by the Australian Television archive.

=== Series 1 (1994–1995) ===
No. overall	No. in series	Title	Directed by	Written by	Original release date
1	1	"Acts of Betrayal"	Paul Moloney	Roger Simpson	9 November 1994
The series commences with Halifax acting as an expert witness at the State Court in the murder case of an upcoming politician. A psychology colleague and ex- boyfriend (Andrew McFarlane) becomes romantically involved with a patient (Sophie Lee) who is run over and killed by his car in front of his practice. He confesses to Halifax his affair then requests patient-client confidentiality and her help, which becomes problematic when the police begin to suspect his involvement after learning of the victim's pregnancy. However, after trying to deflect blame on his patient's boyfriend, he finally admits to the killing and commits suicide off a beach cliff to protect his family.
2	2	"Words Without Music"	Mike Smith	David Boutland	22 March 1995
Halifax travels to HM Prison Campaspe to assess a prisoner on behalf of the parole board. Unconvinced by his reform and conversion to Christianity, she recommends denying him to the board who are in favour of his release. Meanwhile, at a nearby private grammar school for boys, Halifax is asked to provide grief counselling after the untimely death of a senior teacher (Adrian Wright). Halifax, aided by the local police sergeant (John Walton), uncovers the deceased's rivalry with another teacher (Nicholas Eadie) for the principal's job. The murder of a student, however, leads her to uncover an Illuminati-style student group and a troubled student willing to kill to keep their secrets safe.
3	3	"The Feeding"	Steve Jodrell	Mac Gudgeon	26 April 1995
Halifax is called in to assist the police team set up to deal with the 'Make-up serial killer' after the death of seven women in six months. The Premier of Victoria (Peter Adams), aware of the PR implications of the case, also has a rogue cop from Sydney (Steve Bisley), brought in to apply his unorthodox approaches to the hunt too. The newcomer quickly detects an unusual lanolin smell on the victims though his instinct-based approaches soon lead to tension with the science-based Halifax. A mentally unstable suspect (Frances O'Connor) is soon apprehended and Halifax is able to uncover a sad history of incest and abuse within her family, leading to a fatal showdown at the Goldsbrough Mort Woolstore.
4	4	"My Lovely Girl"	Brendan Maher	David Boutland	26 April 1995
A former patient of Halifax's colleague (Paul Sonkkila) brutally kills a nurse, sparking a media debate about the early release of mentally ill criminals. The spotlight then moves to Halifax's ex-patient (Ben Mendelsohn), now a music student, and his girlfriend (Amanda Douge), a fellow student at the conservatory. The presenter of City Tonight (Robert Hughes), stirs the debate and invites Halifax onto his show but ambushes her by also inviting the parents of the woman Halifax's patient killed. Halifax works to help her patient cope with the stress of the media attention and consequent relationship troubles, and exposes the victim's sister's (Radha Mitchell) scheme to unbalance him to kill again.
5	5	"Hard Corps"	Michael Carson	Roger Simpson	14 June 1995
Beneath the West Gate Bridge, an informant is fatally shot by the police. The officers involved are soon interviewed by internal investigations (Tim Robertson; Peter Hardy) nicknamed "the toecutters". One officer (Colin Friels) is quickly suspected, given his involvement in two previous shootings and connections with a known crime boss. The other, a husband and father of two, is deeply traumatised by the killing, particularly given his upcoming role as a witness against the crime boss. Halifax is called in by police PR to help IA sort the truths from deceptions. As the case develops, it is clear that both men are not telling the whole truth, and that an affair with the wife (Belinda McClory) may actually be the reason behind the shooting.
6	6	"Lies of the Mind"	Michael Offer	Jan Sardi	19 July 1995
Halifax is asked to analyse whether or not a suspect (Jacqueline McKenzie) is psychologically fit to stand trial in the murder of her wealthy father and stepmother - where an insanity decision would free her to claim an $80m inheritance. The suspect's psychologist (Marshall Napier) is convinced she suffers from Multiple personality disorder (MPD) with 12 visible personas. One of the detectives investigating the case (Richard Roxburgh) is an ex-patient of Halifax and their sexual attraction leads to complications. In court, the accused claims to be a victim of paternal sexual abuse, something his PA and lover (Angela Punch McGregor) vehemently denies. Despite being attacked, Halifax begins to doubt MPD in favour of False memory syndrome (FMS).

=== Series 2 (1996) ===
Note: Episode 2 was aired after 3.

No. overall	No. in series	Title	Directed by	Written by	Original release date
7	1	"Without Consent"	Michael Offer	David Boutland	14 February 1996
Halifax is visited by an old uni friend (Brett Climo), a photographer, who stays at her apartment. Meanwhile, a convicted rapist (Steve Jacobs), released provisionally on parole, is suspected of recommencing his crime spree based on MO similarities. After being questioned by a no-nonsense detective (Gary Day), he seeks help from Halifax, who has been asked to determine his parole eligibility. One of the original rape victims (Annie Jones) becomes involved, when she tails the rapist seeking justice. The suspect is supported by a restaurant owner, though with time, he becomes increasingly abusive to both her and Halifax. A copycat rapist is caught, who is revealed as the cellmate and lover of the suspect, who then dies after attacking his former victim.
8	3	"Sweet Dreams"	Steve Jodrell	Mac Gudgeon	7 July 1996
The rogue cop from Sydney, Jonah Cole (Steve Bisley), returns to Melbourne after fleeing south from the NSW Police. He is followed there by his ex-partner from homicide (Peter Hosking) and a detective inspector from the drug squad (Max Phipps). Cole, convinced that his drug squad partner was killed by corrupt police such as the DI, seeks out Halifax, and uses her to access his former 'gig' or informant (Beth Buchanan), who was often given drugs as payment. He is further unhinged by a child homicide, creating flashbacks to the death of his 8-year-old sister. After his ex-partner and the informant are both found dead by overdoses, even Halifax begins to suspect him of deadly paranoia. However, in the end, his continued probing in the case forces the corrupt DI to try and silence him.
9	2	"Cradle and All"	Paul Moloney	Katherine Thompson	11 September 1996
A stalker (Ian Bliss), driving a Ford pickup, runs Halifax's mother (Robyn Nevin) off the road after mistaking her for her daughter. Later, Halifax starts to receive flowers, cards, and faxes, as well as unwelcome phone-calls. Eventually, the stalker breaks into her office, assaults her PA, and stages a faked elevator rescue. Meanwhile, Halifax is asked by a lawyer (Andrew Blackman) to analyse a stressed mother who had admitted guilt to police in a complex infanticide case. Her research work is not helped given the aggressive and abusive nature of the woman's partner. However, when the partner dies in a fire, the mother retracts her confession. Halifax then learns that the baby's older sister, in a dissociative state, was responsible for both crimes.

=== Series 3 (1997–1998) ===
No. overall	No. in series	Title	Directed by	Written by	Original release date
10	1	"Déjà Vu"	Paul Moloney	Susan Hore	19 October 1997
During a murder trial, Jane Halifax begins to suspect that the brother of the accused is the murderer. When a lawyer approaches Dr. Jane Halifax in her seaside retreat, she finds herself involved in the trial of a former patient who is accused of burning his parents to death. Realizing the accused may not be guilty, Jane begins to suspect his brother, who seems to be living a bizarre double life. Stars Guy Pearce, Dee Smart, Louise Siversen, and Lewis Fiander.
11	2	"Isn’t It Romantic"	David Caesar	Katherine Thompson	19 July 1998
Halifax is asked by a police detective (Neil Melville) to investigate a crime involving the posing of a body. A ‘psychic investigator’ (Bruce Spence), however, warns them that it will not be an isolated incident. Another detective (Clodagh Crowe) supports Halifax’s involvement, whereas a third (Hugo Weaving) is cynical. Soon, a 17 year old is reported missing in a possible linked case and the psychic quickly locates her posed body. The cynical detective soon focuses in on a likely suspect (Grant Piro), hounding and framing him, based on his previous criminal history, until he suicides. Halifax, however, is not convinced and is able to identify a photographer’s assistant and dance student (Bruce Hughes) with a deadly suppressed persona.
12	3	"Afraid of the Dark"	Steve Jodrell	Roger Simpson	6 September 1998
At a service station near Warren, a mechanic (Shane Connor) leaves for a break and in his absence, an unexplained mass shooting occurs. With nine dead, Halifax responds to a request from detectives (Hugh Jackman; Susan Lyons) for help. Under pressure by the team leader (Barry Langrishe) she agrees to continue supporting the investigation despite her own mental health issues. A disgruntled customer (Brett Swain) is soon identified and he uses his arrest as a platform for an anti-establishment diatribe. However, with no surviving direct eyewitness, pressure mounts on survivors to recall whatever fragments they can. Several scenes with Halifax at a psychiatrist reveal deeply suppressed issues with her father’s suicide, as does a deadly traffic incident from the mechanic’s past.

=== Series 4 (1999) ===
Note: Episode 2 was aired after 3.

No. overall	No. in series	Title	Directed by	Written by	Original release date
13	1	"Someone You Know"	Peter Andrikidis	David Boutland	27 June 1999
Halifax joins detectives (Sonia Todd; Grant Bowler) in investigating the murder of two seemingly unfaithful spouses. The cases become linked when a third woman is murdered under similar circumstances. Messages written on the walls to ‘Jane’ lead police to track and aggressively interview a patient of hers (Samuel Johnson). Halifax’s new PA, Monica Harris, struggles to cope with the demands of her clients, including unscheduled drop ins by a ‘time travelling’ patient (Garry McDonald). Other issues include an increasingly demanding new beau, a solicitor (Simon Westaway), the family ghosts from the lead detective’s past, and her patient’s motive for murder.
14	3	"A Murder of Crows"	Steve Jodrell	Peter Gawler	15 August 1999
In the aftermath of a car and bus crash near Leeton, a hospitalised 17 year-old (Cameron Nugent) admits to the killing of a woman to detectives (Frankie J. Holden; Greg Stone). Earlier, Halifax attends the hospital with her mother and assists a local policeman (Andrew Clarke) - her mother’s boyfriend - by helping to treat the survivors. Many of the casualties are students, returning from a play in Ballarat, and the female driver of the car which caused the crash, the local drama teacher (Marta Dusseldorp), is also injured. Soon, she is found bashed to death and an investigation commences into her relationships and suspected drugging. Halifax’s suspicion falls on a bright, charming student (Petra Yared) who jealously manipulated those around her, leading to a murder attempt at her mother’s house.
15	2	"Swimming with Sharks"	Brendan Maher	Keith Thompson	26 September 1999
Halifax is asked to investigate a murder within a prison. Starring Marton Csokas, Peter O'Brien, Nicholas Bell, Danny Adcock, David Tredinnick and Damien Fotiou.

=== Series 5 (2000) ===
No. overall	No. in series	Title	Directed by	Written by	Original release date
16	1	"A Person of Interest"	Ken Cameron	Anne Brooksbank	11 June 2000
A bungled fatal stakeout and car chase lead to the arrest of an ex-detective (Andy Anderson) and Halifax is asked to assess him prior to his court case. After being bailed, primarily based on Halifax’s assessment, he follows the owner of the crashed panel van - an ex-prisoner who is subsequently found murdered. The lead detective in the case (David Roberts) focuses on the ex-cop as the likely perpetrator, and Halifax is hired by his lawyer (Doris Younane) to help work on his defence. Halifax observes trouble within the ex-cop’s family (Sara Gleeson; Damian Walshe-Howling) and learns of his personal investigation into a pair of serial rapists. However, when he is found dead, suicide is suspected, but Halifax’s search for the remaining culprit leads to his arrest.
17	2	"The Spider and the Fly"	Mark Piper	Peter Gawler	27 August 2000
Halifax returns from lecturing in New Zealand to attend the funeral of a colleague (Fiona Corke) recently stalked by a disgruntled ex-patient (Essie Davis). She then offers to stay a few days and help the husband (Andrew McKaige) look after his family and deal with her belongings, patients, and assistant (Elizabeth Rule). At the practice, Halifax unknowingly counsels the stalker, a violin teacher, who later visits the house and befriends the family, while also breaking in when everyone is out. She also accuses Halifax of trying to interfere. As tensions rise, Halifax also begins displaying symptoms similar to her colleague - fatigue and a dry cough. Reaching out to an old forensics colleague (Tony Barry) she theorises poisoning after a number of similar incidents are uncovered, but is thwarted when the stalker suicides in police custody.
18	3	"A Hate Worse Than Death"	Paul Moloney	Roger Simpson	5 November 2000
A QC is found dead by his apparent secret lover (Nicholas Eadie) and Halifax is called in by detectives (Terry Serio; Dino Marnika) to assist. His widow (Julieanne Newbould) returns home, rejecting the gay lover angle, but is unable to provide a credible alibi. Halifax starts searching at the man’s workplace, a magazine publisher, for menacing letters, and is helped by the editor (Nicki Wendt). Another ‘friend’ of the man, his neighbour, is then killed in a similar way, followed by the murder of his PA (Susan Godfrey). Suspicion falls on an ex-rower, who was angered by the man’s role in his partner’s suicide. After the attack on a detective, Halifax, however, is finally able to see through the man’s lies and deceptions.

=== Series 6 (2001–2002) ===
No. overall	No. in series	Title	Directed by	Written by	Original release date
19	1	"The Scorpion’s Kiss"	Peter Gawler	Paul Moloney	21 October 2001
Halifax is asked by the court to assess and then treat a ‘harmless stalker’ (Richard Cawthorne). His target (Suzi Dougherty), however, does not agree with the assessment, and is soon found shot in her work carpark. Detectives (Rhondda Findleton; Matthew Dyktynski) interview the man without a clear result, although he admits to the shooting when the woman dies. Halifax’s competence is called into question by the husband (William McInnes) and she suffers a string of problems including prescription fraud and computer hacking. She befriends a woman (Caroline Gillmer) who explains she is ex-ASIO and that the victim and her husband are agents too. Halifax soon deduces that the husband’s delusional paranoia led him to recruit the stalker to kill his wife.
20	2	"Playing God"	Lynn Hegarty	Mac Gudgeon	25 November 2001
Halifax is asked by an old friend of her father to help a 13 year-old girl accused of murdering another child. Starring Emily Browning, Catherine Wilkin, Nell Feeney, and Alan Cassell.
21	3	"Takes Two"	Ken Cameron	Katherine Thomson	7 July 2002
Halifax counsels a paranoid young woman (Mary Docker) as her delusional partner (Sacha Horler) holds a man prisoner. She also attends a book signing for her new publication Lies of the Mind. After the man dies, they burn his body, and detectives (David Roberts; Michael Robinson) begin an investigation into his disappearance, interviewing one of his friends (Wayne Hope). Halifax soon begins to suspect a shared psychotic disorder between the women after a strange confrontation at her office. The couple go on to assault another man from their past - a man they knew in a children's home in Seaspray. Halifax travels to the home and learns of an alleged rape by three men on the woman, and helps to stop the killing of the third man.

== Home media ==
DVD name	Format	Ep #	Discs	Region 4 (Australia)	Special features	Distributors
Halifax F.P. (My Lovely Girl)	DVD	N/A	04	1 January 2000	None	Beyond Home Entertainment
Halifax F.P. (Dangerous Minds Series 02)	DVD	N/A	04	1 January 2000	None	Beyond Home Entertainment
Halifax F.P. (Case Files #4)	DVD	N/A	03	11 November 2007	None	Beyond Home Entertainment
Halifax F.P. (Case Files Box Set)	DVD	21	12	2 March 2011	None	Beyond Home Entertainment
Halifax F.P. (Complete Collection)	DVD	21	12	2 May 2018	None	Beyond Home Entertainment
Halifax F.P. (Case Files 1)	DVD	N/A	05	3 April 2019	None	Beyond Home Entertainment
Halifax F.P. (Case Files 2)	DVD	N/A	06	3 April 2019	None	Beyond Home Entertainment
Halifax F.P. (Collection 01: Series 01–03)	DVD	12	12	27 October 2021	None	Via Vision Entertainment
Halifax F.P. (Collection 02: Series 04–06)	DVD	09	09	5 January 2022	None	Via Vision Entertainment

== Reception ==
The show went on to be nominated for and win a number of AFI awards.

AACTA Award for Best Telefeature, Mini Series or Short Run Series:

- 1995 The Feeding (Winner); Hard Corps (Nominated); Lies of the Mind (Nominated)
- 1996 Cradle and All (Nominated)
- 1998 Afraid of the Dark (Nominated)
- 1999 Swimming with Sharks (Nominated)
- 2000 A Person of Interest (Nominated)
- 2002 Takes Two (Nominated)

=== Best Actor in a Leading Role in a Television Drama ===
- 1995 (Hard Corps) Colin Friels & Steven Vidler (Winner); (The Feeding) Steve Bisley (Nominated); (Lies of the Mind) Richard Roxburgh (Nominated)
- 1998 (Afraid of the Dark) Shane Connor (Nominated)
- 1999 (Swimming with Sharks) David Tredinnick (Nominated)

=== Best Performance by an Actor in a Telefeature or Mini Series ===
- 2000 (A Person of Interest) Andy Anderson (Winner); (A Hate Worse Than Death) Nicholas Eadie (Nominated)

=== Best Actress in a Leading Role in a Television Drama ===
- 1995 (Lies of the Mind) Jacqueline McKenzie (Winner); (Lies of the Mind) Rebecca Gibney (Nominated)
- 1998 (Afraid Of The Dark) Rebecca Gibney (Nominated)
- 2002 (Takes Two) Mary Docker (Nominated)

=== Best Performance by an Actress in a Telefeature or Mini Series ===
- 2000 (The Spider And The Fly) Essie Davis (Nominated); (A Person Of Interest) Rebecca Gibney (Nominated)

=== Best Screenplay in a Television Drama ===
- 1995 Lies of the Mind (Nominated); The Feeding (Nominated)
- 1998 Afraid of the Dark (Nominated)
- 2000 A Person of Interest (Nominated)
- 2002 Takes Two (Nominated)

== See also ==
- List of Australian television series
