= Fiona Corke =

Australian actress

- Born: 24 September 1961 (age 65); Melbourne, Victoria, Australia
- Height: 1.68 m (5 ft 6 in)
- Spouse: Nick Carrafa

Fiona Corke (born 24 September 1961) is an Australian actress best known for her role as Gail Robinson on the Australian soap opera Neighbours.

== Early life ==
Corke grew up in Chewton near Castlemaine, Victoria, in Australia. She lived in Melbourne from the age of 18.

At the age of 20, Corke began her acting career with New Theatre Day Time, a theatre-in-education group. She auditioned for her role as Gail in Neighbours a week before leaving on a holiday to New York. While away, she received the news from her manager that she had scored the role, and had to come back to Australia several weeks early.

== Career ==
Corke began her career with a minor role in the 1985 TV film I Live with Me Dad. That same year, she appeared as a guest star in Zoo Family. In 1986, she then had a role in Prisoner: Cell Block H as Alison Mills, who dated derided prison officer Rodney Adams. The role was intended to be ongoing, however, it prematurely ended when Prisoner was cancelled. Corke then joined the cast of Grundy stable-mate Neighbours in 1987, playing regular character Gail Lewis/Robinson, staying with the show until 1989.

Corke has also made guest appearances on a variety of prime time shows and had a recurring role as Trudi Dawson on the ABC drama SeaChange.

After Corke returned for a cameo appearance as Gail in Neighbours in 2005, she returned three more times for guest appearances in 2006, 2007 and again in 2019 for an extended guest stint which saw the return of all of Paul Robinson’s ex-wives in a plot devised by Gail and Paul's daughter Elle, played by Pippa Black.

In 2007 and 2008, Corke appeared in Rush and several episodes of City Homicide.

Corke wrote, produced and directed her first short film Woundead, which was selected for the 2009 St Kilda Short Film Festival.

== Personal life ==
Corke is married to actor and musician Nick Carrafa who also appeared in Neighbours as Tony Romeo.

Corke has lived in Victoria's Macedon Ranges since 2002. She is a well-known wildlife activist and campaigner. In 2007, she co-founded the Macedon Ranges Wildlife Network with other local wildlife carers and rescuers. She is also vice president of the Australian Society for Kangaroos, raising awareness of the cruelty involved in the culling/shooting of kangaroos under government permits.

Corke took several years hiatus from acting due to a bad skin cancer on her face.

== Filmography ==
=== Film ===
Year	Title	Role	Notes
1984	Love Me Stupid... A Story of Blood	Jenny	Short film
1992	A Slow Night at the Kuwaiti Cafe		
1993	My Forgotten Man (aka Flynn)	Miss Taylor	
1993	Gross Misconduct	Detective Coote	
1994	A Lamb of Our Own Flock	Mother	
1994	Undying	Cara	
2007	Little Deaths	Ellie	

==== As producer / director ====
Year	Title	Role	Notes
2009	Woundead	Producer / director	Short film

=== Television ===
Year	Title	Role	Notes
1985	I Live with Me Dad	Nursing Sister	TV movie
1985	Zoo Family	Fiona	1 episode
1986	Prisoner	Alison Mills	2 episodes
1986	The Fast Lane	Susie	1 episode
1987–1989; 2005; 2006; 2006; 2019	Neighbours	Gail Lewis Robinson	325 episodes
1992	Cluedo	Jan Mustard	1 episode
1992	Chances	Nightingale Dali	3 episodes
1993	Phoenix	Dog 1	1 episode
1994	The Man from Snowy River	Lola Hatton	1 episode
1995	Police Rescue	Sandra	1 episode
1996	Mercury	Karin Grunewald	2 episodes
1996; 1997	Blue Heelers	Thea Copeland	2 episodes
1996; 2000	Halifax f.p.	Lisa McNamara / Christine	2 episodes: "Cradle and All", "The Spider and the Fly"
1998	Driven Crazy	Rhonda	3 episodes
1998–2000	SeaChange	Trudi Dawson	6 episodes
2001	The Saddle Club	Dee Marsden	1 episode
2002	Short Cuts	Elisa Bennett	4 episodes
2007–2009	City Homicide	Judith Welling	3 episodes
2009	Rush	Kate Hawker	1 episode
2016	Winners & Losers	Gloria White	2 episodes

== Theatre ==
=== As actor ===
Year	Title	Role	Notes
1984	On the Line		La Mama, Melbourne
1985	Hello Mr Star		Church Theatre, Melbourne
1985	Rebel Without a Cause		University of Melbourne
1985; 1987	The Journey		La Mama, Melbourne, Universal Theatre, Melbourne, Wharf Theatre, Sydney, Majestic Cinemas, Sydney
1990–1991	Peter Pan		Marlowe Theatre, Canterbury, UK
1992	Up 'N' Under		Universal Theatre, Melbourne

=== As writer ===
Year	Title	Role	Notes
2023	Ground Control	Writer	Gasworks Arts Park for Melbourne Writers' Theatre
2025	Metropolis Monologues: The Drowning	Writer	The Stables @ Meat Market for Melbourne Writers' Theatre
