= Afraid of the Dark (Halifax f.p.) =

1998 Australian crime television film

- Halifax f.p. episode
- Poster
- Episode no.: Season 3 Episode 3
- Directed by: Steve Jodrell
- Written by: Jutta Goetze (story), Roger Simpson
- Original air date: 6 September 1998

Guest appearances
- Rebecca Gibney; Shane Feeney-Connor; Hugh Jackman

"Afraid of the Dark" is a 1998 Australian crime television film broadcast on 6 September 1998, as part of the third season of Halifax f.p., and directed by Steve Jodrell and starring Rebecca Gibney, Shane Feeney-Connor and Hugh Jackman. The film was released on DVD under the title Profile of a Serial Killer on 19 October 2004.

== Premise ==
When a shocking massacre in a small-town diner leaves no clues, Forensic Psychologist Dr. Jane Halifax (Gibney) teams up with Senior Detective Eric Ringer (Jackman) for one of the toughest cases of their careers.
