= Annie Jones (actress) =

Australian actress

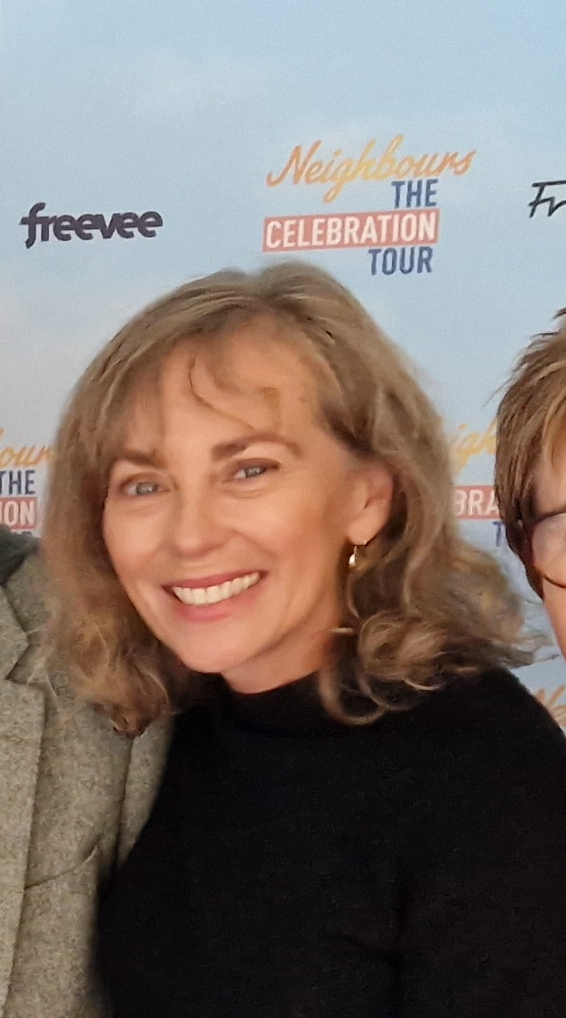
- Jones at the Neighbours – The Celebration Tour in 2023
- Born: Annika Jasco; 13 January 1967 (age 59); Adelaide, South Australia, Australia
- Occupations: Actress, model
- Years active: 1984–present
- Spouse: Paul Moloney (m. 1989)
- Awards: Logie Award for Most Popular Actress; Logie Award for Most Popular Actress in a Telemovie or Miniseries

Annie Jones (born Annika Jasco; 13 January 1967) is an Australian actress, known for her roles in soap operas and serials, most especially Sons and Daughters as Jess Campbell, in Neighbours as Jane Harris and Newlyweds as Allie Carter. She has won two Logie Awards.

== Early life ==
Annie Jones was born Annika Jasco to Hungarian immigrants who met in Adelaide and married after her father found employment as an opal miner. She has three older sisters. The family spent many years in Coober Pedy.

== Career ==
Professionally taking the stage name Annie Jones, she undertook some modelling, including an appearance in the music video for the Huxton Creepers song "Pretty Flamingo" in 1987. Jones began acting at aged 17 in the title role in the film drama Run, Chrissie, Run! She then appeared in television roles on The Henderson Kids (1985), and Sons and Daughters (1985–1986) as Jesse Campbell.

Jones auditioned for the role of Charlene Robinson (which she lost to Kylie Minogue) in the television soap opera Neighbours, at age 19. She eventually landed the role of Jane Harris in 1986, and would continue in that role until 1989. Jones received the Logie Award for Most Popular Actress for the role. In April 1988, Jones presented a report on the opening day of World Expo 88 for Network Ten.

Post-Neighbours in 1990, Jones played Lorna Jackson, an opal miner's daughter and brief love interest for Dr David Radclife (Brett Climo), in an episode of TV series The Flying Doctors. She also played Clare Mallory in the drama miniseries Jackaroo, which won her a second Logie Award for Most Popular Actress in a Telemovie or Mini-series in 1991. She then played Alison Button, a love interest for Col'n (Kym Gyngell), in two episodes of comedy series Col'n Carpenter in May 1991. She also guested in an episode of Bony in 1992 as Sarah, who Jones described as "an insecure 'surfie chick'". She also starred as Eva Kovac in the historical mini-series Snowy (1993).

Jones starred as Allie Carter in the Australian sitcom Newlyweds with Christopher Gabardi in 1993 and 1994. In February 1996, Jones played rape survivor Alison Hart in the Halifax f.p. telemovie "Without Consent". Jones described the role as "a really fantastic opportunity to do something really gritty." She guest starred in The Adventures of Lano & Woodley in 1997.

Jones played mother Sue Green in children's television series Pig's Breakfast, and she made her second appearance in Blue Heelers in 2002 as Ben Stewart's (Paul Bishop) former wife Angela.

Jones has guest starred in many Australian series including City Homicide (2007), Stingers (2003), Marshall Law (2002), Good Guys, Bad Guys (1997) and Halifax f.p. (1996). She also appeared in the Mortified episode "Mother in the Nude" (2006).

In 2010, she was cast in the television movie Underbelly Files: Tell Them Lucifer was Here, which tells of the biggest criminal investigation in the history of the state of Victoria. Jones played parole officer Rachel Sanger in three episodes of Wentworth in 2013. She also appeared in the 2014 Australian show Worst Year of My Life Again.

In March 2015, she took part in a documentary special, Neighbours 30th: The Stars Reunite, celebrating the show's 30th anniversary. The following year, Jones was reunited with her Neighbours co-star Guy Pearce when she guested in his drama series Jack Irish. She also filmed guest appearances in the Seven Network drama Winners & Losers, and The Doctor Blake Mysteries.

In April 2018, she reprised the role of Jane Harris in Neighbours. In 2019, Jones starred as Colleen Cotterill in Seven Network's Secret Bridesmaids' Business, which was based on the stage play by Elizabeth Coleman. On 27 June 2020, it was announced that Jones had reprised the Neighbours role as a permanent cast member and she remained in the role until the show's then final episode on 28 July 2022. The series was later picked up by streaming service Amazon Freevee and Jones was confirmed to be reprising her role in February 2023.

== Personal life ==
Jones has been married to director Paul Moloney since 1989. The couple met on the set of The Henderson Kids.

After leaving Neighbours in 1989, Jones put her acting career on hold to take care of her mother, who had Alzheimer's disease. Jones stated "She had the disease for many, many years and I became her carer. Anyone who has had anything to do with Alzheimer's or dementia will know what it's like. It's heart-breaking, seeing someone disappear before your eyes. Because of that, I had neither the time nor the energy to commit to a long-running series and could only do guest roles here and there."

== Filmography ==
=== Film ===
Year	Title	Role	Notes
1984	Run, Chrissie, Run!	Chrissie	
1984	Lands In South Australia	Presenter	Short film documentary
1985	Fair Deal	Herself	Short film documentary
1988	A Losing Battle: Adolescent Body Image	Presenter	Short video documentary
1988	A Losing Battle: Adolescent Eating	Presenter	Short video documentary
2000	The Monkey's Mask	Evelyn McDonald	Uncredited
2006	Five Moments of Infidelity	Julie / Wife (Segment 5)	
2007	The Condemned	Karen	Uncredited
2015	Sneezing Baby Panda: The Movie	Character voice	

=== Television ===
Year	Title	Role	Notes
1985	The Henderson Kids	Sylvia Wheeler	Recurring role
1985–1986	Sons and Daughters	Jess Campbell	Credited as Annika Jones
1986–1989, 2005, 2018–2025	Neighbours	Jane Harris	Main cast
1989	A Tribute to Neighbours: Celebrating 1000 Episodes	Herself / Jane Harris	TV documentary special
1990	The Flying Doctors	Lorna Jackson	Episode: "End of the Rainbow"
1990	Jackaroo	Clare Mallory	Miniseries
1990	Embassy	Elizabeth	Episode: "Foreign Affairs"
1991	Col'n Carpenter	Alison Button	Episodes: "A Kind of Loving: Part 1" and "A Kind of Loving: Part 2"
1991	Chances	Paris	Recurring role
1992	Bony	Sarah	Episode: "Surf, Sun, Sand... and Murder"
1993	Snowy	Eva Kovac	Main cast
1993–1994	Newlyweds	Allie Carter	Main cast
1995	Rainbow's End	Rhonda Nesbitt	Television film
1996	Blue Heelers	Angela Harrigan	Episode: "Old Sins, Long Shadows"
1996	Halifax f.p.	Alison Hart	Episode: "Without Consent"
1997	Good Guys, Bad Guys	Veronica Flaherty	Episode "Fatal Distraction"
1997	The Adventures of Lano & Woodley	Con Artist	Episode "The Two Men"
1999	Pig's Breakfast	Sue Green	Main cast
2000	BeastMaster	The Guardian	Episode: "The Guardian"
2001	The Wonderful World of Disney	Mother	Episode: "Child Star: The Shirley Temple Story"
2002	Shock Jock	Various roles	Episode: "Vive la différence"
2002	The Secret Life of Us	Nicole	Episode: "Signs of Life"
2002	Marshall Law	Sandra	Episode: "The Samovar"
2002	Blue Heelers	Angela White	Episodes: "Deep Water" and "Nothing Personal"
2003	Stingers	Helene Harris	Episode: "Priapus' Playground"
2003	The Saddle Club	Beth Elliot	Episode: "Blind Faith"
2006	Mortified	TV Reporter	Episode: "Mother in the Nude"
2006	Tripping Over	Wendy	Episode 1.1
2007	City Homicide	Kelly Pilsbury	Episodes: "Cut and Dried" and "Rostered Day Off"
2011	Underbelly Files: Tell Them Lucifer was Here	Dorothy Debs	Television film
2011	Dogstar	Various voices	
2013–2014	Wentworth	Rachel Sanger	Recurring role
2014	Worst Year of My Life, Again!	Mum	
2015	Neighbours 30th: The Stars Reunite	Herself	TV documentary
2016	Winners & Losers	Karen Triggs	Episode: "iBloom"
2016	Jack Irish	Judy	Episode 1.01
2017	The Doctor Blake Mysteries	Billie Bentley	Episode: "Hear the Angels Sing"
2019	Secret Bridesmaids' Business	Colleen Cotterill	Main cast
