= Nick Carrafa =

Australian actor

- Born: Australia
- Occupation: Actor
- Years active: 1984–present
- Spouse: Fiona Corke

Nick Carrafa is an Australian actor best known for his television roles as Tony Romeo on the Australian soap opera Neighbours and Alfredo on the comedy series Acropolis Now.

== Career ==
Carrafa began his career with a guest role in the 1984 Crawford Productions series Special Squad, before guest starring on Prisoner. He joined the cast of long-running soap opera Neighbours in 1987, playing Tony Romeo from episode 628.

Carrafa has appeared in many television series and theatre productions.

== Personal life ==
Carrafa met his wife, fellow Neighbours alumnus Fiona Corke, before appearing in the series himself.

== Filmography ==
=== Film ===
| Year | Title | Role | Notes |
|---|---|---|---|
| 1984 | Love Me Stupid... A Story of Blood | Bobby | Short film |
| 1985 | Burke & Wills | Edwin Welch | |
| 1987 | Hungry Heart | Sal Bono | |
| 1994 | Undying | Peter | Short film |
| 1995 | Inheritance | | Short film |
| 1997 | Mr. Nice Guy | NEA Head Officer | |
| 2001 | Hostage to Fate | Nic | |
| 2018 | The Widow | Nello | Short film |
| 2019 | Promised | Mr Bellucci | |

=== Television ===
| Year | Title | Role | Notes |
|---|---|---|---|
| 1984 | Special Squad | Camilleri | 1 episode |
| 1986 | Prisoner | Mick Warner | 5 episodes |
| 1989 | The Power, The Passion | Nick Casalla | |
| 1989 | Arguing the Toss of a Cat | Joe | TV movie |
| 1985; 1987–1988; 1999; 2016 | Neighbours | Tim Duncan / Tony Romeo / Peter Hannay | 55 episodes |
| 1990 | Mission: Impossible | Jared | 1 episode |
| 1991–1992 | Acropolis Now | Alfredo | 20 episodes |
| 1993 | Phoenix | Serio Diego | 3 episodes |
| 1994 | Ocean Girl | Haig | 1 episode |
| 1995 | Snowy River: The McGregor Saga | Alan Grout | 2 episodes |
| 1995; 1997 | Halifax f.p. | Homicide Detective #1 / Alan Howard | 2 episodes |
| 1996; 2001; 2005 | Blue Heelers | Anthony Kelvin / Blaine O'Connor / Phil Grant | 3 episodes |
| 1997–1998 | State Coroner | George Cardillo | 28 episodes |
| 1999 | Law of the Land | Neil | 1 episode |
| 2000 | Stingers | Dave Delamonte | 1 episode |
| 2002 | The Secret Life of Us | Bob | 1 episode |
| 2005 | Scooter: Secret Agent | Garner, Agent X-81 | 1 episode |
| 2008 | Rush | Carlo Lavilla | 1 episode |
| 2012 | Miss Fisher's Murder Mysteries | Pierre Sarcelle | 1 episode |
| 2013 | The Shumps | Naked Chef | 1 episode |
| 2016 | Winners & Losers | Cliff Boyes | 3 episodes |
| 2019 | Secret Bridesmaids' Business | Sam Salluzio | 1 episode |

== Theatre ==
| Year | Title | Role | Notes |
|---|---|---|---|
| 1980 | Twelfth Night | Orsino | VCA |
| 1980 | The Fire Raisers | Policeman / Chief Fireman | VCA |
| 1980 | Testing Ground | | La Mama, Melbourne |
| 1981 | The Three Sisters | Ferapont / Rode / Anfissa | Performance Studio One, Melbourne with VCA |
| 1981 | Oedipus | | Zoo Studio, Melbourne with VCA |
| 1981 | Pericles | Pericles | VCA |
| 1983 | Porn: No Rape Trigger | | Studio 322, Melbourne |
| 1983 | Beyond Therapy | | Playbox Theatre, Melbourne |
| 1984 | Ivanov | | Anthill Theatre, Melbourne, with Australian Nouveau Theatre & Old Scream Theatre |
| 1984 | The Tramp's Revenge | The Tramp | St Martins Youth Arts Centre, Melbourne, with Playbox Theatre, Melbourne |
| 1985 | Cyrano de Bergerac | Pastry Cook | Playhouse, Melbourne with MTC |
| 1985 | Victoria Bitter | Footman / Settler / Tudor / Ernest / Soldier / Chinese Man / Reveller / Digger / Mr Coles / Annie's Man / Photographer / Heckler / Minion / Kaiser / Boy | Playhouse, Melbourne, with MTC |
| 1985 | Trumpets and Raspberries | Orderly 2 | Playhouse, Melbourne with MTC |
| 1987 | Popular Front | Roberto / Clarrie / various roles | Theatre Works, Melbourne |
| 1987 | The Comedy of Errors | | Church Theatre, Melbourne with Australian Contemporary Theatre Company |
| 1987 | The Crimson Parrot | | Church Theatre, Melbourne |
| 1988 | Love Off The Shelf | | Universal Theatre, Melbourne |
| 1988 | Moliere | Moirron | Key Studios, with Australian Nouveau Theatre for Spoleto Melbourne Festival of the Arts |
| 1990 | Siren | Kostas | Melbourne Athenaeum, Lyric Theatre, Brisbane, Canberra Theatre with Australian Shakespeare Company |
| | My Name is Pablo Piccasso | | Playbox Theatre, Melbourne |
| 1991 | Hair – The Tribal Love Rock Musical | Claude | Australian national tour |
| 1992 | Twelfth Night | Orsino | Royal Botanic Gardens Melbourne with Australian Shakespeare Company |
| 1993 | An Evening with Merv Hughes | | His Majesty's Theatre, Perth |
| 1994 | The Gift of the Gorgon | | Russell St Theatre, Melbourne with MTC |
| 1994 | The Emerald Room | Axel Cruz-e | Playhouse, Adelaide with STCSA |
| 1995 | The Incorruptible | Tim Blackburn / various roles | Malthouse Theatre, Melbourne, Geelong Arts Centre, The Capital, Bendigo, Monash University, Melbourne, with STC & Playbox Theatre Company |
| 1997 | Emma: Celebrazione! | | Malthouse Theatre, Melbourne, with Playbox Theatre Company |
| 2007 | An Accidental Actress | Video Director | Three Monkeys Tavern, Wodonga with HotHouse Theatre |
