= Alan Hardy (producer) =

Australian writer and producer

- Occupations: Writer; producer
- Children: Marieke Hardy
- Relatives: Frank Hardy (father); Mary Hardy (aunt)
- Writing career
- Language: English

Alan Hardy is an Australian writer and producer, who has worked extensively in television.

== Early life ==
Hardy is the son of novelist and writer Frank Hardy and stenographer Rosslyn Phyllis Couper, who married on 27 May 1940 at St Patrick's Cathedral in Melbourne. He has two sisters, Frances Hardy and Shirley Hardy-Rix, the latter a writer and the 2018 Koroit Irish Festival ambassador.

== Career ==
Hardy got his start in acting in the 1960s, with a 1962 stage production of Sandhog for Sydney's New Theatre, also attending the 1962 Youth Festival in Helsinki that year. He continued to work in theatre, with performances in The Wall and The Marriage (both 1963), The World of Sholem Aleichem and Androcles and the Lion (1964) and A Penny for a Song (1965), You've Never Had It So Good (1966), On Stage Vietnam and Pirates at the Barn (both 1967). He also acted on stage at the Wayside Chapel.

In the 1970s, Hardy went on to act on television, with series including Rush (1974), Homicide, Tandarra (1976), Bluey (1976) and Cop Shop (1977) as well as the 1976 television adaption of his father Frank Hardy's classic 1950 novel Power Without Glory. He also appeared in films including The Great MacArthy (1975), Mad Dog Morgan (1976), Blue Fire Lady (1977) and The Chant of Jimmie Blacksmith (1978).

Hardy then moved into television production, starting out as producer on Crawford’s 1983 miniseries, All the Rivers Run, followed by children's drama series The Henderson Kids (1985; 1987), both of which he also acted in. He also produced House Rules (1988). He produced a second series of All the Rivers Run in the 1990s, before joining Grundy’s to produce ABC series Embassy, winning him his first Australian Film Institute Award.

He then partnered with Pino Amenta and Philip Dalkin, producing sitcoms including All Together Now (1991-1993), The Bob Morrison Show (1994) and Us and Them (1995). He also produced children's series The Wayne Manifesto (1996-1997), based on the David McRobbie novel. In 1997, the series saw him nominated three times in category for Best Episode in a Long Running Television Drama Series at the Australian Film Institute Awards, winning for the episode "Amy Pastrami Day".

In 1999, Hardy produced the crime drama TV movie Witch Hunt and played the role of Reverend Polson in American fantasy miniseries Journey to the Center of the Earth alongside Treat Williams, Jeremy London and Bryan Brown.

Hardy's production credits extended into the following decade, beginning with ABC soap opera Something in the Air from 2000 to 2002. He was a triple nominee for Best Episode in a Long Running Television Drama Series at the 2001 Australian Film Institute Awards, winning for the episode "That One Defining Moment".

He was then a producer and script editor on Marshall Law in 2002 as well as producing and contributing scripts for children's series Fergus McPhail in 2004. The latter saw him nominated for a 2004 AFI Award for Best Children’s Television Drama. He subsequently contributed scripts to long-running soap opera Home and Away from 2007 to 2009, and was script editor and story producer for police procedural series City Homicide from 2009 to 2011.

Hardy continued acting throughout his production work, with his last two appearances being Laid and City Homicide in 2011.

== Awards ==
Year	Work	Award	Category	Result	Ref.
1984	All the Rivers Run	Logie Awards	Best Series	Nominated	
1991	Embassy (Season 2, Episode 1: "A Human Dimension")	Australian Film Institute Awards	Best Episode in a Television Drama Series or Serial	Won	
1992	All Together Now	Logie Awards	Most Popular Light Entertainment Program	Nominated	
1997	The Wayne Manifesto (Episode 20: "Amy Pastrami Day")	Australian Film Institute Awards	Best Children's Television Drama	Won	
1997	The Wayne Manifesto (Episode 11: "Junk")	Australian Film Institute Awards	Best Children's Television Drama	Nominated	
1997	The Wayne Manifesto (Episode 5: "Pizza")	Australian Film Institute Awards	Best Children's Television Drama	Nominated	
2001	Something in the Air (Episode 224: "That One Defining Moment")	Australian Film Institute Awards	Best Episode in a Long Running Television Drama Series	Won	
2001	Something in the Air (Episode 227: "Into Thy Hands")	Australian Film Institute Awards	Best Episode in a Long Running Television Drama Series	Nominated	
2001	Something in the Air (Episode 244: "Living In The Past")	Australian Film Institute Awards	Best Episode in a Long Running Television Drama Series	Nominated	
2004	Fergus McPhail	Australian Film Institute Awards	Best Children’s Television Drama	Nominated	

== Personal life ==
Hardy is married to fellow writer, producer and editor Galia Hardy. Their daughter is writer, producer, presenter and former actress Marieke Hardy, who they raised in the Melbourne suburbs of Hawthorn East and Richmond.

Hardy's aunt was Logie Award-winning comedian and presenter Mary Hardy.

== Credits ==
=== As producer / writer ===
Year	Title	Role	Notes
1977	The Box	Writer	5 episodes
1977–1978	The Sullivans	Script editor	33 episodes
1978	The Sullivans	Associate producer	4 episodes
1983	All the Rivers Run	Producer	8 episodes
1985	The Henderson Kids	Producer	24 episodes
1987	The Henderson Kids II	Producer	24 episodes
1988	House Rules	Producer	
1990	All the Rivers Run II	Story development / Producer	4 episodes
1990	Embassy	Producer	1 episode
1992	I Live with Me Dad	Post-production producer	TV movie
1991–1993	All Together Now	Story consultant / Producer	101 episodes
1992–1993	All Together Now	Writer	4 episodes
1994	The Bob Morrison Show	Co-creator / Story consultant / Producer	26 episodes
1995	Us and Them	Producer / Co-creator	13 episodes
1996–1997	The Wayne Manifesto	Producer	26 episodes
1999	Witch Hunt	Producer	TV movie
2000	Eugenie Sandler P.I.	Script editor	1 episode
2000–2002	Something in the Air	Writer / Producer	318 episodes
2002	Marshall Law	Producer	17 episodes
2002	Marshall Law	Script editor	
2004	Fergus McPhail	Producer	26 episodes
2005–2006	HeadLand	Script producer/ Story editor	47 episodes
2008–2009	Home and Away	Writer	4 episodes
2009–2010	City Homicide	Head of script department / Script editor	34 episodes
2010–2011	City Homicide	Script producer	22 episodes
2011	Knife	Producer	Short film
2013	Neighbours	Producer	3 episodes

=== As actor ===
==== Film ====
Year	Title	Role	Notes	Ref.
1975	The Great MacArthy	Drive-in Attendant		
1976	Mad Dog Morgan	Bob		
1977	Raw Deal	Husband at Dance (uncredited)		
1977	Blue Fire Lady	Rodeo Man #2		
1978	The Chant of Jimmie Blacksmith	Carmichael		
1982	Duet for Four	Hotel Manager		

==== Television ====
Year	Title	Role	Notes	Ref.
1973	Division 4	Weirdo	1 episode	
1973; 1974	Matlock Police	Hillbilly 2 / George Parker	2 episodes	
1974	Rush	Hayes	1 episode	
1975	Homicide	Steve	1 episode	
1976	Tandarra	Cecil	1 episode	
1976	Power Without Glory	Jim Tracey	Miniseries, 3 episodes	
1976	Bluey	Bill Owens	1 episode	
1977	The Sullivans	Journalist / Andy	9 episodes	
1977–1981	Cop Shop	Errol Simms / Des Farley / Streaker	3 episodes	
1980	Young Ramsay	Constable Don Barren	1 episode	
1980	Lawson's Mates	Jim Bentley	1 episode	
1981	The Homicide Squad	Murray Carter	TV movie	
1983	All the Rivers Run	Reverend Polson	Miniseries, 3 episodes	
1985	The Henderson Kids	Morrison	4 episodes	
1999	Journey to the Center of the Earth	Reverend Polson	Miniseries, 2 episodes	
2011	Laid	Zach's Dad	1 episode	
2011	City Homicide	Peter Falldner	1 episode	

==== Theatre ====
Year	Title	Role	Notes	Ref.
1962	Sandhog		Waterside Workers' Federation Hall with New Theatre, Sydney	
1963	The Wall		New Theatre, Sydney	
1963	The Marriage		New Theatre, Sydney	
1964	The World of Sholem Aleichem		New Theatre, Sydney	
1964	Androcles and the Lion	Roman patrician	New Theatre, Sydney	
1965	The Ballad of Angel’s Alley		New Theatre, Sydney	
1965	A Penny for a Song	Breeze	New Theatre, Sydney	
1965	My Life with an Interval for Asprin		Independent Theatre, Sydney	
1966	You’ve Never Had It So Good		New Theatre, Sydney	
1966	The Sport of My Mad Mother		Wayside Theatre, Sydney with The Group Theatre	
1967	On Stage Vietnam		New Theatre, Sydney	
1967	Pirates at the Barn		New Theatre, Sydney	
1971–1972	The Incredible Mind-Blowing Trial of Jack Smith		Presbyterian Ladies’ College, Melbourne & Traralgon with Theatre in Education	
1978	Alice in Wonderland		Pilgrim Puppet Theatre, Hawthorn	
