= Kris Noble =

Australian television director

- Noble interviewed in Ten News, 2004
- Born: 12 October 1952 (age 73); India
- Occupations: Television executive and executive producer
- Years active: 1972–2014
- Employers: Australian Broadcasting Corporation (1972–1988); Seven Network (1988–1989); Nine Network (1989–2002); Seven Network (2003); Network Ten (2004–2007)
- Known for: Big Brother, Moby Dick and Farscape

Kris Noble (born 12 October 1952) is an Australian retired television executive, director and producer best known for his work in the Australian television industry and on American co-productions Moby Dick and Farscape. He is also known for being the executive producer of Big Brother.

Noble was born in India and then raised in Britain before relocating to Australia in the 1970s when he was in his early 20s. Noble's early television career in Australia began with a 16-year stint at the Australian Broadcasting Corporation in the 1970s and 1980s. While at ABC, Noble helped launch the careers of Australian comedians Rob Sitch, Santo Cilauro, Marg Downey, Michael Veitch, Magda Szubanski and Tom Gleisner when he saw the potential for a sketch television show after seeing their comedy show at The Last Laugh in Melbourne in 1984. Noble produced the 1989 Logie Awards telecast for Seven Network before leaving the network.

At the 50th Primetime Emmy Awards in 1998, Noble was named as one of the nominees for Most Outstanding Miniseries for his work on Moby Dick which was shot in Australia. In the mid-2000s, Noble served as managing director of production company Endemol Southern Star until resigning in 2007.

== Career ==
=== Australian Broadcasting Corporation ===
Noble's time at the ABC included working as a director on Countdown.

In September 1984, Noble was appointed as producer and director of second series of Australia You're Standing In It succeeding John Eastway.

When a sequel to the satirical ABC program The Gillies Report called The Gillies Republic was aired in 1986, Noble was appointed as an associate producer on the show. After Noble developed a pilot episode of The D-Generation for the ABC, two series of the program were produced which were met with critical acclaim.

In September 1987, the ABC debuted a new live Saturday morning youth program called The Factory hosted by Alex Papps and Andrew Daddo. Just days before its first airing, the program's executive producer Grant Rule resigned with Noble urgently brought in as a replacement.

In late 1987, Noble developed a pilot for comedian Gerry Connolly under the working title Are We To Be Spared Nothing?. Just like how he had first seen the members of The D-Generation, Noble had also seen Connolly perform at The Last Laugh in Melbourne and saw potential in Connolly's comic talent, impressed with his ability to ad-lib.

=== Seven Network ===
In 1988, Noble began a brief tenure at the Seven Network.

One of his first jobs at Seven was as the executive producer of a new Saturday morning show hosted by Jono and Dano (Jonathan Coleman and Ian Rogerson) called Saturday Morning Live.

While at Seven, Noble also produced and directed a series of comedy specials in 1988 featuring Irishman Dave Allen as well as the John Farnham concert special Classic Jack in 1989 which saw Farnham perform with the Melbourne Symphony Orchestra.

=== Nine Network ===
==== Arrival at Nine ====
In 1989, Noble began his lengthy tenure with the Nine Network.

He was appointed as the executive producer of the new home video clip series Graham Kennedy's Funniest Home Video Show in 1990, hosted by Australian television veteran Graham Kennedy. Notorious for his temper and for sending faxes, Kennedy's first fax relating to the program sent to Channel 9 was addressed to Noble. It read: "You've probably heard stories about how 'difficult' I am to work with and how I shout and have tantrums! All these stories are true. It's all caused by nervous tension and very little of the abuse is meant - if any. This note to you is simply to warn you that it WILL happen and I apologise in advance."

In June 1990, Noble warned viewers of Graham Kennedy's Funniest Home Video Show that if the network received any home video of potentially dangerous behaviour, they would likely be reported to the authorities. Noble was reported as saying: "If we see that a child, adult, or animal has been put in danger we will not hesitate to report them. We've had one bad video where a child was throwing a cat. We were horrified by it and sent a letter and the video back." The RSPCA also warned that if they received information about the exploitation of animals, they would also launch a prosecution.

Graham Kennedy's Funniest Home Video Show was the final television series hosted by Kennedy. After his departure, the show was re-titled to Australia's Funniest Home Video Show with Queensland television identity Jacki MacDonald replacing Kennedy as host. Although the taping of the show was relocated to Brisbane, Noble continued on as executive producer flying to Brisbane for the tapings.

In 1991, Noble became the executive producer of Nine's new sitcom All Together Now, created by Pino Amenta, Philip Dalkin and John Powditch. The show became a hit for Nine Network, becoming one of the few successful Australian multi-camera sitcoms filmed in front of a live studio audience.

==== Head of Drama appointment ====
After his workload at Nine had expanded to overseeing All Together Now, game show Cluedo, drama The Flying Doctors, controversial soap opera Chances as well as another sitcom called My Two Wives, Noble was appointed as Nine's head of drama in 1992.

His appointment came at a time when the network hadn't produced many successful drama series for some time with the exception of The Flying Doctors. By his own admission, Nine didn't have "a good track record".

Despite the disappointing ratings of the network's revamped version of The Flying Doctors (retitled to R.F.D.S.), Noble was keen to promote Nine's new batch of drama in 1993 including Law of the Land, Snowy, The Feds, telemovie Singapore Sling, children's drama Ship to Shore and a new soap called Paradise Beach. All programs had some degree of success, with the exception of Paradise Beach which struggled in the ratings and was almost universally panned by television critics.

As head of drama, Noble saw the network's fortunes regarding commissioning successful drama series gradually turn throughout the 1990s with Halifax f.p, Water Rats, Twisted Tales, Good Guys, Bad Guys, Murder Call and Stingers as well as children's fantasy drama Spellbinder all among the show's considered successful for the network under Noble's supervision.

Noble was protective of the network's drama offerings, going as far as writing a letter to the editor in 1996 in response to a reader's accusations of racism in Water Rats.

After the failure of Paradise Beach, Noble seemed to be reluctant to consider any further soap operas for Nine and openly criticised the genre in 1995, declaring "The soapie is dead. People don't have time for ongoing storylines - they get home later, the pace of living is faster, there's more competitions from videos and movies. People miss a few episodes in a series and they can't be bothered catching up." Despite this, Nine commissioned soap opera Pacific Drive which began airing on Nine the following year.

==== International success ====
In 1997, it was reported that the Nine Network and Britain's Whale Productions were filming the miniseries Moby Dick in Port Phillip Bay, with a cast including Patrick Stewart, Gregory Peck, Henry Thomas and Bruce Spence. Noble was impressed with the production quality stating "All the effects look great - everything is so real... People won't know where the location is and who is behind it. They will think because it is so good that it has been made in Hollywood."

The Moby Dick miniseries, which aired on the USA Network, was met with critical acclaim. It received three nominations at the 50th Primetime Emmy Awards in 1998. Moby Dick was nominated for Outstanding Miniseries (losing to From the Earth to the Moon, Patrick Stewart was nominated for Outstanding Lead Actor in a Miniseries or Movie (losing to Gary Sinise) and Gregory Peck was nominated for Outstanding Supporting Actor in a Drama Series (losing to George C. Scott).

Noble was named as one of the senior production staff in the Outstanding Miniseries nomination along with Francis Ford Coppola, Fred Fuchs, Robert Halmi Sr., Steve McGlothen and Franc Roddam.

In 1998, a new films and television unit was launched at the Nine Network. The unit's first project was the ambitious 22-episode space adventure Farscape, created by Rockne S. O'Bannon, which was produced in association with The Jim Henson Company. Noble was credited as an executive producer on the show along with O'Bannon, Brian Henson and Robert Halmi Jr. Farscape enjoyed success and the show earnt a number of Saturn Awards. It also led to a Farscape convention in California. The 2004 miniseries Farscape: The Peacekeeper Wars was produced to conclude the show following the sudden cancellation of the series by the Sci-Fi Channel in 2002.

==== Criticism of the ABA ====
The scheduling of Nine's soap Pacific Drive was a sore point for Noble, who saw its potential to be a suitable afternoon drama to complement the network's American soaps, Days of Our Lives and The Young and the Restless. This prompted Noble to attack the Australian Broadcasting Authority for their refusal to consider a local daytime drama eligible for local drama quota points which is usually reserved for programs between 5pm and midnight.

Taking umbrage at criticism in The Sydney Morning Herald who described the ratings figures for Pacific Drive (airing at 11pm) as "one terrible embarrassment", Noble penned a letter condemning the ABA. Revealing that Nine had intended to schedule Pacific Drive at 3:30pm following The Young and the Restless, Noble said the network had lobbied the ABA hoping they would change their rulings to allow an Australian mid-afternoon drama to count as local content, arguing that if the program was high quality and not a "cheap excuse" to avoid their responsibilities regarding the drama quota, it should be irrelevant to when the program aired.

Noble wrote: "The ABA, however were not amenable to this argument, clearly feeling that the strong afternoon viewing audience should be left to overseas soaps and talk shows, that an attempt to provide local product to their taste was somehow less worthy than providing local product for prime-time viewing tastes. Why can't an Australian soap compete in the potentially higher rating mid-afternoon timeslot with the American soaps?"

Responding to Noble's criticism, the ABA's Fiona Chisolm laid the blame at the Australian television industry for daytime Australian dramas being ineligible for local content quota points, stating: "It was the production industry and industry lobby groups (including Nine) that argued against expanding the timeband, considering it to be a serious threat to the levels of drama production... and likely to result in the production of inexpensive, lower quality dramas."

Pacific Drive was later moved to an afternoon timeslot, despite being the show not being able earn Nine any local drama quota points. Nine temporarily stopped production of the soap in 1997 to clear a backlog episodes which were not able to air due to the network's live cricket coverage. At this time, Noble continued his argument for it to be eligible for local content quota points, citing the show's competitive ratings in the 3:30pm timeslot (with a 40% national audience share, with a 70%-80% share of the female 18-39 demographic), stating: "If quality Australian drama programs can compete with American soaps in the afternoon, then they should be able to qualify for local content quotas."

==== The Last of the Ryans criticism ====
In April 1997, Noble defended Nine's decision to commission a television movie about Ronald Ryan, the last man legally executed in Australia for the 1965 murder of George Hodson. Hodson's daughter Carole Barns criticised the way her father was portrayed in the movie and for the way it had portrayed Ryan, played by Richard Roxburgh, as a "likeable larrikan". Noble said it wasn't Nine's intention to glorify Ryan and said that although he felt sorry for Barns, he believed she was more upset about the way they focused on Ryan instead of her father. Noble later said that the rationale behind making the film was because of Ryan's status as the last person hanged in Australia. He said Barnes' father was indeed an unsung and forgotten hero.

==== Hi-5 ====
In 1999, Noble submitted a proposal to Nine to commission a fast-paced children's television show for pre-schoolers called Hi-5, created by Helena Harris and Posie Graeme-Evans, featuring original members Kellie Crawford (née Hoggart), Kathleen de Leon Jones, Nathan Foley, Tim Harding and Charli Robinson. Despite it being surplus to the network's quota of children's programming, the network accepted the submission with Noble surprised at how quickly his idea got through. Noble admitted he saw the potential for revenue to be generated by merchandise relating to the show as a way to compensate the network for not being permitted to show advertising during P-classified programming, stating: "The growth market in videos alone - Wiggles, Bananas, Teletubbies - is massive. We've looked at that and noticed this is an area that maybe we should get into... The toy market around the world has just exploded. When we took this program to merchandisers, just the pilot alone, I couldn't believe the amount of money that was pledged in the way of merchandising."

==== Departure from Nine ====
Noble continued at Nine until 2002. Rural drama McLeod's Daughters was one of the final successful series that he oversaw at the network. His departure came after the failure of Young Lions, created by Michael Jenkins and starring Alex Dimitriades.

Noble was succeeded at Nine by co-creator of McLeod's Daughters and Hi-5, Posie Graeme-Evans.

=== Later career ===
After leaving Nine, Noble was the executive producer of Seven's 2003 talk show, Greeks on the Roof, hosted by the fictional character of Effie and her family, which was based on the British show The Kumars at No. 42. Despite the show being short lived, it caused conflict between the networks after Nine personality Sam Newman appeared on the show reportedly as part of deal which would have seen Effie appear on Nine's equally short-lived Micallef Tonight. Seven reportedly reneged on the deal preventing Effie from appearing on Nine but Noble denied there was such a deal.

During his time at Endemol Southern Star, he was the executive producer of reality show Big Brother Australia for Network 10, from the fourth series until the seventh series, during which time he was regularly quoted in the media responding to the various controversies arising from the reality show.

In 2014, Noble was credited as an executive producer of a medical infotainment series called Save Your Life Tonight hosted by Andrew Daddo with whom Noble had worked with on The Factory in the 1980s. Produced by Queensland production company Wild Fury for ABC TV, Save Your Life Tonight was filmed in late 2013 in the Edwin Tooth Auditorium at the Royal Brisbane and Women's Hospital and commenced airing on 14 December 2014.

Noble has since retired from the television industry.

== Views ==
Noble defended commercial free-to-air television in 1994 and said that viewers had been so conditioned to commercial breaks that they tended to miss them if there weren't any. He also said that there was no need for subscription television in Australia because "we have the best free-to-air television in the world. The range is enormous. It caters for everybody." He also added that he thought pay TV wouldn't be completely commercial free for much longer.

In 1995, Noble described the Logie Awards as having become "mickey mouse" and criticised the voting process, stating: "It's really hard to believe that shows like Money or Australia's Funniest Home Video Show don't get nominated and then Mother and Son gets nominated and new episodes are not even going to air. What's it doing there? You really have to ask yourself exactly who is voting and how they're voting."

Speaking in 1995, Noble attributed the criticism Nine faced for producing Chances is that Australian society had higher expectations regarding the portrayal of women in the media compared the earlier era of Australian television which saw soap operas The Box and Number 96 become notorious for sex and nudity. He stated: "I think society has changed to a point where you can't put a sex scene at the beginning of a program and then expect high ratings - look at the backlash we had with Chances. I think generally in society that kind of thing is very uncool now. We are more concerned about how women are portrayed - you don't see the token blonde with big tits anymore. Issues of sex and violence, and the effect TV has on people generally, let alone children, is at the forefront of people's minds, and programmers are more sensitive to those issues."

In 1999, Nine was the only Australian television network to have a gay character in a weekly drama series with Toni Scanlan's character in Water Rats being openly gay. Despite receiving some complaints from viewers about having a gay character in Water Rats, Noble said the complaints wouldn't stop the network from adding gay characters to other series, stating: "The complaints won't stop us as long as it's done correctly and we are not trying to sensationalise gay people or vilify them... We'll do it more as people get used to it, but it will take a bit of time."

== Filmography ==
=== Film ===
Title	Year	Credited as	Notes
Title	Year	Executive Producer	Notes
Dirty Deeds	2002	Yes	
Gettin' Square	2003	Yes	
Southern Cross	2004	Yes	
Under the Radar	2004	Co-executive	

=== Television ===
Title	Year	Credited as		Network	Notes
Title	Year	Producer	Executive Producer	Network	Notes
Australia You're Standing In It	1984	Yes	No	ABC TV	Producer and director (series 2)
The D-Generation	1986–87	Yes	No	ABC TV	Producer and director (series 1–2)
All Together Now	1991–93	No	Yes	Nine Network	
Paradise Beach	1993–94	No	Yes	Nine Network	
Snowy	1993	No	Yes	Nine Network	
The Bob Morrison Show	1994	No	Yes	Nine Network	
Singapore Sling	1994	No	Yes	Nine Network	Television film
Halifax f.p.	1994–2002	No	Yes	Nine Network	
The Feds: Obsession	1994	No	Yes	Nine Network	Television film
The Feds: Suspect	1995	No	Yes	Nine Network	Television film
The Feds: Deception	1995	No	Yes	Nine Network	Television film
Singapore Sling: Road to Mandalay	1995	No	Yes	Nine Network	Television film
The Feds: Abduction	1995	No	Yes	Nine Network	Television film
Singapore Sling: Midnight Orchid	1995	No	Yes	Nine Network	Television film
Glad Rags	1995	Yes	No	Nine Network	
The Feds: Seduction	1995	No	Yes	Nine Network	Television film
Singapore Sling: Old Flames	1995	No	Yes	Nine Network	Television film
The Feds: Terror	1995	No	Yes	Nine Network	Television film
Spellbinder	1995	No	Yes	Nine Network	
Us and Them	1995	No	Yes	Nine Network	
The Feds: Vengeance	1995	No	Yes	Nine Network	Television film
Water Rats	1996–2001	No	Co-executive	Nine Network	Co-executive producer (94 episodes)
The Feds: Betrayal	1996	No	Yes	Nine Network	Television film
The Feds: Deadfall	1996	No	Yes	Nine Network	Television film
Twisted Tales	1996–98	No	Yes	Nine Network	
One Way Ticket	1997	No	Yes	Nine Network	Television film
Reprisal	1997	No	Yes		Television film
Good Guys Bad Guys: Only the Young Die Good	1997	No	Yes	Nine Network	Television film
The Last of the Ryans	1997	No	Yes	Nine Network	Television film
Good Guys, Bad Guys	1997–98	No	Yes	Nine Network	
Murder Call	1997–2000	No	Co-executive	Nine Network	Co-executive producer
Spellbinder: Land of the Dragon Lord	1997	No	Yes	Nine Network	
Moby Dick	1998	Yes	No	USA Network	Miniseries
Skippy: Adventures in Bushtown	1998–99	No	No	Nine Network	Network executive producer
Stingers	1998–2002	No	Yes	Nine Network	Executive producer (seasons 1–6)
The Violent Earth	1998	No	Yes	Nine Network	Miniseries
Without Warning	1999	No	Yes		Television film
Farscape	1999–2000	No	Yes	Nine Network	Executive producer (season 1)
Hi-5	1999–2002	No	Yes	Nine Network	Executive producer series 1–4)
Journey to the Center of the Earth	1999	No	Yes	USA Network	Miniseries
Dogwoman: Dead Dog Walking	2000	No	Yes	Nine Network	Television film
Dogwoman: The Legend of Dogwoman	2000	No	Yes	Nine Network	Television film
Waiting at the Royal	2000	No	Yes	Nine Network	Television film
Dogwoman: A Grrrl's Best Friend	2000	No	Yes	Nine Network	Television film
Cushion Kids	2001	No	Yes	Nine Network	
Flat Chat	2001	No	Yes	Nine Network	
Outriders	2001	No	Yes	Nine Network	
McLeod's Daughters	2001–03	No	Yes	Nine Network	Executive producer (seasons 1–3, episode 6)
Escape of the Artful Dodger	2001	No	Yes	Nine Network	
Tanya and Floyd	2002	No	Yes		Television film
Kangaroo Creek Gang	2002	No	Co-executive	Nine Network	Co-executive producer (season 1)
Seconds to Spare	2002	No	Yes	Nine Network	Television film
Young Lions	2002	No	Co-executive	Nine Network	
Don't Blame Me	2002	No	Yes	Nine Network	
Greeks on the Roof	2003	No	Yes	Seven Network	
The Postcard Bandit	2003	No	Yes	Nine Network	Television film
Snobs	2003	No	Yes	Nine Network	
Big Brother	2005–07	No	Yes	Network 10	Executive producer (2005–06), co-executive producer (2007)
Save Your Life Tonight	2014	No	Yes	ABC TV	
