= Hannah Greenwood =

Australian actress

- Born: Melbourne, Victoria, Australia
- Occupation: Actress
- Years active: 1998–present
- Spouse: James Spencer m. 2016

Hannah Greenwood is an Australian stage and television actress, best known for starring as Saskia Litras in the Australian children's television series Noah and Saskia. She is a co-founder of Lightning Jar Theatre based in Melbourne.

== Career ==
Greenwood was involved in theatre and television since age 11, when she played a girl in a coma on State Coroner.

=== Television ===
Her television credits include major roles on children's shows such as High Flyers, Horace and Tina, Legacy of the Silver Shadow, and Noah and Saskia. Greenwood also played the part of Teresa Cammeniti on Neighbours. Her other guest appearances include Stingers, Short Cuts, and Blue Heelers.

=== Stage ===
Since training at the Western Australian Academy of Performing Arts in Perth, Greenwood has appeared in numerous stage productions. Her stage credits include Top Girls, A Midsummer Night's Dream, and Uncle Vanya. She appeared in director David Myles' productions of Salonika Bound, One Flew Over the Cuckoo's Nest, and Elena and the Nightingale.

Greenwood played Mash in Stupid F**king Bird, the debut stage production of Lightning Jar Theatre in 2017. A review in Australian Arts Review commended her "lovely storytelling" and character work which was "compelling and coherent" throughout the time jumps in the play. In 2025, Greenwood played the drug dealer Bernadette in POTUS: Or, Behind Every Great Dumbass are Seven Women Trying to Keep Him Alive. A review in Theatre Matters said, "Hannah Greenwood is great fun as the lesbian lothario drug mule", praising her chemistry with Lightning Jar co-founder Tilly Legge.

== Filmography ==
- State Coroner (1 episode, 1998) (TV)
- Stingers (1 episode, 1999) (TV)
- High Flyers (1999) (TV)
- Horace & Tina (18 episodes, 2001) (TV)
- Short Cuts (1 episode, 2002) (TV)
- Legacy of the Silver Shadow (2002) (TV)
- Noah & Saskia (13 episodes, 2004) (TV)
- Blue Heelers (2 episodes, 2002–2005) (TV)
- Neighbours (6 episodes, 2006) (TV)
