= The Bob Morrison Show =

Television series

- Genre: Comedy
- Written by: Philip Dalkin; Alan Hardy; Galia Hardy; Anthony Morris; Jan Sardi; Stig Wemyss; Kate Langbroek
- Directed by: Pino Amenta; Mike Smith; Esben Storm; Mark DeFriest; Andrew Friedman; Bruce Myles
- Starring: Andy Anderson; Nikki Coghill; Matt Day; Stig Wemyss
- Theme music composer: Peter Sullivan
- Country of origin: Australia
- Original language: English
- No. of seasons: 2
- No. of episodes: 26

Production
- Executive producers: Philip Dalkin; Kris Noble
- Producers: Alan Hardy; Peter Howden; John Powditch
- Running time: 30 mins
- Production company: Telltale Films Pty Ltd

Original release
- Network: Nine Network
- Release: 22 February – 19 August 1994

The Bob Morrison Show is an Australian sitcom that screened on the Nine Network in 1994.

== Synopsis ==
The Bob Morrison Show is the story of an ordinary family from through the eyes of their pet dog, Bob Morrison. Bob is an adorable stray that is welcomed by the youngest member of the Morrison clan, Ben, but he has a tough time winning over the rest of the family.

== Cast ==
- Andy Anderson as Steve Morrison
- Nikki Coghill as Lizzy Morrison
- Christopher Lyons as Ben Morrison
- Elissa Elliot as Maxine Morrison
- Matt Day as Jake Duffy
- Stig Wemyss as the voice of Bob

== Production ==
The Nine Network series consisted of 26 episodes of 30 minutes each. The first episode premiered on 22 February 1994 and the last episode aired on 19 August 1994.

== Episodes ==
=== Season One ===
No.	Title	Written by	Original release date
1	"Arrival"	Pino Amenta, Philip Dalkin, Alan Hardy	February 22, 1994
2	"Identity"	Pino Amenta, Philip Dalkin, Alan Hardy	March 1, 1994
3	"De-sexed"	Pino Amenta, Philip Dalkin, Alan Hardy	March 8, 1994
4	"Fleas"	Pino Amenta, Philip Dalkin, Alan Hardy	March 15, 1994
5	"Binky"	Pino Amenta, Philip Dalkin, Alan Hardy	March 22, 1994
6	"Wax"	Pino Amenta, Philip Dalkin, Alan Hardy	March 29, 1994
7	"Crow"	Pino Amenta, Philip Dalkin, Alan Hardy	April 5, 1994
8	"Mower"	Pino Amenta, Philip Dalkin, Alan Hardy	April 12, 1994
9	"Fishing"	Pino Amenta, Philip Dalkin, Alan Hardy	April 19, 1994
10	"Broke"	Pino Amenta, Philip Dalkin, Alan Hardy	April 26, 1994
11	"Picnic"	Pino Amenta, Philip Dalkin, Alan Hardy	May 3, 1994
12	"Drunk"	Pino Amenta, Philip Dalkin, Alan Hardy	May 10, 1994
13	"Pansy"	Pino Amenta, Philip Dalkin, Alan Hardy	May 17, 1994

=== Season Two ===
No.	Title	Written by	Original release date
14	"Baby"	Pino Amenta, Philip Dalkin, Alan Hardy	May 24, 1994
15	"Holiday"	Pino Amenta, Philip Dalkin, Alan Hardy	May 31, 1994
16	"Tuckshop"	Pino Amenta, Philip Dalkin, Alan Hardy	June 7, 1994
17	"Training"	Pino Amenta, Philip Dalkin, Alan Hardy	June 14, 1994
18	"Anniversary"	Pino Amenta, Philip Dalkin, Alan Hardy	June 21, 1994
19	"Plumber"	Pino Amenta, Philip Dalkin, Alan Hardy	June 28, 1994
20	"Nice"	Pino Amenta, Philip Dalkin, Alan Hardy	July 5, 1994
21	"Apprentice"	Pino Amenta, Philip Dalkin, Alan Hardy	July 12, 1994
22	"Lalophobia"	Pino Amenta, Philip Dalkin, Alan Hardy	July 19, 1994
23	"Smell"	Pino Amenta, Philip Dalkin, Alan Hardy	July 26, 1994
24	"Dinner"	Pino Amenta, Philip Dalkin, Alan Hardy	August 2, 1994
25	"Date"	Pino Amenta, Philip Dalkin, Alan Hardy	August 9, 1994
26	"Bike"	Pino Amenta, Philip Dalkin, Alan Hardy	August 16, 1994

== See also ==
- List of Australian television series
