= All the Rivers Run =

1958 novel by Nancy Cato

- Based on: All the Rivers Run by Nancy Cato
- Written by: Peter Yeldham; Colin Free; Vince Moran; Gwenda Marsh
- Directed by: George Miller; Pino Amenta
- Starring: John Waters; Sigrid Thornton
- Country of origin: Australia
- Original language: English
- No. of episodes: 4

Production
- Producer: Alan Hardy
- Production company: HBO Premiere Films
- Budget: $3 million

Original release
- Network: Seven Network
- Release: 4 October – 24 October 1983

All the Rivers Run is an Australian historical novel by Nancy Cato, first published in 1958. It was inspired by the life of Pearl Wallace, Australia's first river boat Skipper.

It was adapted as a 1983 Australian television miniseries starring Sigrid Thornton and John Waters. The miniseries is marketed with the tagline A sweeping saga of one woman's struggle for survival. A sequel, All the Rivers Run II, was produced in 1989.

== Story ==
All the Rivers Run follows the life of English girl, Philadelphia Gordon, from the time when she is shipwrecked and orphaned off the coast of Victoria in 1890. She spends most of her life around Echuca, on the Murray River, and invests some of her inheritance in the paddle steamer called PS Philadelphia. Her life is changed forever when she meets paddle steamer captain Brenton Edwards. She is torn between the harsh beauty of life on the river with its adventures, and the society life in Melbourne with her blossoming career as a painter. It is an adventure and a love story: between her, the men in her life, and the river.

== Cast ==
- Sigrid Thornton as Philadelphia Gordon
- John Waters as Brenton Edwards
- Charles Tingwell as Uncle Charles
- Nicholas Brown as Gordon
- Dinah Shearing as Aunt Hester
- Adrian Wright as Alistair Raeburn
- Diane Craig as Miss Dorothy Barrett
- Gus Mercurio as Tom Critchley
- John Alansu as Ah Lee
- William Upjohn as Adam
- Frank Gallacher as Mac
- Constance Landsberg as Bessie Griggs
- Darius Perkins as Ben
- Caroline Gillmer as Mabel Blackeney
- Kirk Alexander as Jim
- Celia de Burgh as Imogen
- Chantal Contouri aa Julia
- Nick Waters aa Mr. Slope
- Carol Burns aa Mrs. Slope
- Vivean Gray as Alicia Raeburn
- Betty Lucas as Janet Raeburn
- Cliff Ellen as Elijah
- Peta Toppano aa Eunice Pike
- Reg Gorman as Examining Skipper
- Mary-Anne Fahey as Hilda
- Michele Fawdon as Ruth
- Mike Bishop as Grainger

== Production ==
Both mini-series were shot on location in Echuca, as well as locations in Melbourne.

The paddle steamer PS Pevensey was filmed as the PS Philadelphia. Today, visitors to Echuca can take short trips on it.

== Release ==
The first series comprises four two-hour episodes first broadcast in October 1983, the second series comprises two two-hour episodes first broadcast on 18 March 1990. In the US, the mini-series was shown on the premium channel, HBO, premiering on 15 January 1984.

All the Rivers Run: The Definitive Collection DVDs contains both mini-series, as Parts I and II. The Part 1, All the Rivers Run I, is on 3 DVDs, with 8 episodes of approximately 48 minutes each (even though they are advertised as one-hour episodes). Disc 1 contains episode 1 (51 minutes 28 seconds) and episode 2 (45:58). Disc 2 contains episode 3 (46:25), episode 4 (47:37) and episode 5 (48:57). Disc 3 contains episode 6 (50:14), episode 7 (48:01), episode 8 (48:30), a three-minute interview with John Waters, an eight-minute interview with Sigrid Thornton and a trailer/promotion for the mini-series. The Part 2, All the Rivers Run II, is on 2 DVDs. The first disc contains episode 1 (1 hour 36 minutes 34 seconds) and the second disc contains episode 2 (1:37:47). It also includes an audio CD with the soundtrack from the miniseries.

== Reception ==
The series was a massive ratings success in Australia and was sold to over 70 countries, including the US, where it was screened by HBO premiering on 15 January 1984 on the network. and in the USSR where it ran in 1988.

== All the Rivers Run II ==
All the Rivers Run
- Written by: Vince Moran; Barbara Bishop
- Directed by: John Power
- Starring: John Waters; Nikki Coghill; Parker Stevenson; Charles Tingwell
- Country of origin: Australia
- Original language: English
- No. of episodes: 2

Production
- Producer: Alan Hardy

Original release
- Network: Seven Network
- Release: 18 March – 19 March 1990

The sequel follows on with the same main characters, but with actress Nikki Coghill replacing Sigrid Thornton in the leading role. New characters include Cyrus P. James (Parker Stevenson), a handsome American, and Arthur Blackwell (Tim Robertson), a rich villain who wants to buy out the PS Philadelphia.

=== Main cast ===
- John Waters – Brenton Edwards
- Nikki Coghill – Philadelphia Gordon
- Parker Stevenson – Cyrus
- Charles Tingwell – Uncle Charles
- John Jacobs – Sid
- John Alansu – Ah Lee
- Sudi de Winter – Gordon
- Tim Robertson – Blackwell
- Alan Fletcher – McLean
- Kahlie Sneddon – Meg
- Eric McKibbin – Brenny
- Gil Tucker – Hopkins
- Jon Concannon – Bates
- Michele Fawdon – Ruth
- David Cameron – Enright
- Peta Toppano – Eunice Pyke
