= Aljin Abella =

Australian actor (born 1985)

- Born: 27 July 1985 (age 41); Philippines
- Occupation: Actor
- Years active: 1999–present

Aljin Abella (born 27 July 1985), also known as Alin Abella, is an Australian actor of Filipino descent, who is best known for playing Theo Martin, the Blue Ranger, on Power Rangers Jungle Fury, in all 32 episodes of the show, which aired in 2008. Also, he starred in the app series "Hunter n' Hornet" in 2014.

== Career ==
Abella is also well known for many prominent roles in top Australian theatre productions, such as 'The Monkey King' in " Monkey...Journey to the West". The actor made his big stage debut in 2005, as Joe, in "The Sapphires", in the Melbourne Theatre Company and Belvoir productions, as well as touring to London and Korea. Later, he has had roles in: "The Good Person of Szechuan", "Moths", "Triumph", "Strangers in Between", "Three Sisters", "The Matchmaker", "Love Labour's Lost", "The Laramie Project", "The Fortunes of Richard Mahony", "Anything Goes", and "The New Black".

In 2014, he was nominated for a Green Room Award for ' Best Supporting Actor in Musical Theatre' for his role as Joseph in "La Cage Aux Folles".

In 2016, he was cast as Iago in Disney's musical Aladdin, which ran from August to December.

In 2020, he was cast as Weselton in Disney's musical Frozen.

In 2023, he was cast as Flashbang, a minor but recurring roll in The Artful Dodger.

== Film and television roles ==
- High Flyers as Kyet Nguyen (1999)
- Horace & Tina Josh (2001, unknown episodes)
- Guinevere Jones as Spencer Huang (2002, unknown episodes)
- Legacy of the Silver Shadow as Campbell (2002, 13 episodes)
- Bootleg as Dave Hoosan (2002)
- Power Rangers Jungle Fury as Theo Martin/Blue Jungle Fury Ranger (2008, 32 episodes)
- The Doctor Blake Mysteries as Simon Lo (2013 episode 8)
- Hunter n Hornet Cade/Hornet (2014, 20 episodes)
- The Artful Dodger as Flashbang (2023)
