= Sarah Chadwick =

Australian television actress

- Born: 11 August 1960 (age 66); Sydney, New South Wales, Australia
- Education: National Institute of Dramatic Art (1986–1988)
- Occupations: Actress, TV presenter
- Known for: The Flying Doctors; The Adventures of Priscilla, Queen of the Desert; Packed To The Rafters
- Spouse: Harry Cripps (divorced)

Sarah Chadwick (born 11 August 1960) is an Australian television actress best known for her role on The Flying Doctors as Dr. Rowie Lang, and for her role as Marion Barber in the 1994 film The Adventures of Priscilla, Queen of the Desert. as well as Trish Westaway, on Packed To The Rafters the mother of Sammy Rafter Jessica McNamee and the mother-in-law of Nathan Rafter Angus McLaren

== Early life ==
Chadwick attended Catholic high school Brigidine College Randwick, in Sydney. Before she took up acting at the age of 25, Chadwick worked as a receptionist at the offices of the Nine Network. From 1986, she studied at National Institute of Dramatic Art (NIDA), in Sydney, graduating with a Bachelor of Dramatic Art (Acting) in 1988.

== Career ==
Chadwick gained early acting experience performing in stage productions at Sydney's Genesian Theatre.

After early guest roles in E Street and Rafferty's Rules in 1989, Chadwick landed the recurring role of Dr Cathy Mitchell on medical drama, G.P. that same year. After a year, she decided to leave the series, as she felt it was "time to move on". Following this, she secured her best known role as main character Dr. Rowie Lang on another medical drama The Flying Doctors, from 1991 to 1992.

In 1991, she was a guest presenter on the long-running children's programme, Play School.

From there, Chadwick played three further lead characters in three short-lived television series – 1992 sitcom Late for School as Kathy Price, 1995 children's series, Glad Rags as Patricia 'Trish' Forbes. and 2001 sitcom, Flat Chat as Sarah. In 1999, she played Mashowna in the adventure miniseries Journey to the Center of the Earth, opposite Bryan Brown and Jeremy London.

From 2008 to 2013, Chadwick had a recurring guest role in Packed to the Rafters, playing Trish Westaway. She also played the two recurring guest characters of Vanessa Unley and Diana Walford in long-running soap opera, Home and Away in 2011 and 2017, respectively. She guested in several other popular Australian dramas including Blue Heelers, All Saints, MDA, Water Rats and Wildside as well as the ABC miniseries The Damnation of Harvey McHugh.

Chadwick's film work began with a role in 1993 thriller, Gross Misconduct opposite Naomi Watts and Jimmy Smits. That same year, she played Tess in the 1993 TV movie, You and Me and Uncle Bob. This was followed by her role as Marion Barber (the ex-wife of Hugo Weaving’s character) in 1994 Australian comedy classic, The Adventures of Priscilla, Queen of the Desert. She later appeared as Andrea Byrne in the 2009 TV movie, A Model Daughter: The Killing of Caroline Byrne, based on the true story of Australian model Caroline Byrne, who died in 1995.

Chadwick has appeared in stage productions of Stella by Starlight at the Ensemble Theatre and The Cherry Orchard at New Theatre, both in Sydney. She has most recently starred in a 2024 production of The House of Bernarda Alba, playing the role of Bernarda. She is set to appear in Ensemble Theatre's The Social Ladder in 2026.

In 2013, Chadwick was working as an administrator for fellow G.P. alumnus Denise Roberts, at Screenwise, her Sydney-based acting school.

== Personal life ==
Chadwick was previously married to film and television writer, Harry Cripps, who worked opposite her in Late for School and as her director on Flat Chat. She also performed in Cripp's play Tanya and Kit, for La Mama in 1994.

== Filmography ==
=== Film ===
Title	Year	Role	Type
1993	Gross Misconduct	Laura Thorne	Feature film
1994	The Adventures of Priscilla, Queen of the Desert	Marion Barber	Feature film
2008	From Inside a Girl's Room		Film short
2011	Short Beach		Film short
2012	Circle of Lies	Luise Dixon	Feature film

=== Television ===
Title	Year	Role	Type
1989	E Street	Amanda	1 episode
1989	Rafferty's Rules	Mrs. Finnegan	1 episode
1989	G.P.	Dr. Cathy Mitchell	13 episodes
1991	A Country Practice	Carol Baker	2 episodes
1991	Play School	Guest Presenter	2 episodes
1991–1992	The Flying Doctors	Dr. Rowie Lang	46 episodes
1992	Late for School	Kathy Price	13 episodes
1993	You and Me and Uncle Bob	Tess	TV movie
1994	The Damnation of Harvey McHugh	Kathryn	Season 1, 1 episode
1995	Glad Rags	Patricia 'Trish' Forbes	13 episodes
1995	Law of the Land	Loretta	1 episode
1997	Water Rats	Yvonne Carlisle	1 episode
1998	Wildside	Jan Reilly	1 episode
1998; 2005	All Saints	Karen Stoner / Francesca Norman	3 episodes
1999	Journey to the Centre of the Earth	Mashowna	TV miniseries
1999	Airtight	Newsreader	TV movie
2001	Flat Chat	Sarah	13 episodes
2002	Bad Cop, Bad Cop	Deborah Sidebottom	1 episode
2002	Tanya and Floyd	Tanya	Pilot
2003	MDA	Dr. Sarah Christie	1 episode
2005	Blue Heelers	Acting Sgt Lindy Schroeder	3 episodes
2005–2006	HeadLand	Diane Forbes	5 episodes
2006	Monarch Cove	Vanessa Reade	1 episode
2008–2013	Packed to the Rafters	Trish Westaway	15 episodes
2009	A Model Daughter: The Killing of Caroline Byrne	Andrea Byrne	TV movie
2011	Crownies	Justice Stanton	1 episode
2011; 2017	Home and Away	Diana Walford / Vanessa Unley / Diana	15 episodes
2016	Janet King	Justice Stanton	1 episode
2022	Remember My Name	Fay Umback	5 episodes

== Theatre ==
Title	Year	Role	Type
1985	Plaza Suite		Genesian Theatre, Sydney
1992	Love Letters	Melissa Gardner	Sydney Opera House
1994	Tanya and Kit	Tanya	La Mama, Melbourne
	The Man Who Came to Dinner		Genesian Theatre, Sydney
	The Judgment of Helen		
2007	Stella by Starlight	Stella	Ensemble Theatre, Sydney
2014	Keeping Up Appearances		Short+Sweet
2016	The Cherry Orchard	Lyubov Ranevskaya	New Theatre, Sydney
2022	SLAP. BANG. KISS.		Southbank Theatre, Melbourne with MTC
2024	The House of Bernarda Alba	Bernarda	Flow Studios, Sydney with Frantic Muse Productions
2026	The Social Ladder		Ensemble Theatre, Sydney
