= Bradley Byquar =

Australian actor and dancer

- Occupation: Actor
- Notable work: Heartland

Bradley Byquar is an Australian actor and dancer. For his performance in Heartland he was nominated for the 1994 AFI Award for Best Lead Actor in a Television Drama.

On TV Byquar featured Heartland on the ABC in 1994 and in Fireflies, ABC 2004. He starred in Ivan Sen's short film Wind as an aboriginal tracker and featured in the Australian sci-fi film Zone 39.

On stage Byquar played in 1997's Ngundalehla Godotgai, a staging of Waiting for Godot translated into Galibal, in Up the Road (Belvoir Street Theatre, 1996 and The Malthouse, 1997) and The Singing Land (Belvoir Street Theatre, 1993)
