= Barracuda (1988 film) =

- Directed by: Pino Amenta
- Starring: Dennis Miller; Andrew McFarlane; Shane Briant
- Music by: Chris Neal
- Country of origin: Australia
- Original language: English

Production
- Cinematography: David Connell
- Running time: 94 mins

Original release
- Network: Seven Network
- Release: 1988

Barracuda is a 1988 Australian TV film.

Writing in the Age Jim Schembri called the names of the lead detectives as Abbottson and Costelli a "comic contrivance" and writes "The film is dogged by an awful soundtrack (you can always tell something sinister is happening because of the pulsing string section), leaden pacing (with plot you should have movement), some loose ends that stay that way (what was the deal with Abbottson's former partner?), and some limply staged action (the finale is real fizzer). The Sydney Morning Herald's Alison Stewart says "Surprisingly, it's quite watchable, despite the vaguely clichéd plot, which weaves in corrupt assistant police commissioners, prominent Sydney businessmen, ritual Triad killings, brothels, bribes, greed and a whole assortment of shots of the Opera House." Doug Anderson in the Sydney Morning Herald gave it a rating of "View at Own Risk!" Rob Lowing's capsule review in the same paper gave it 2 1/2 stars noting "Plot lacks excitement but the cast is solid".

== Cast ==
- Dennis Miller as Det Snr Constable Abbottson
- Andrew McFarlane as Det Sgt Mark Castello
- Shane Briant as Zoli Scoane
- Cassandra Delaney as Cheri Scoane
- Roger Ward as Bill 'The Dentist'
- Robert Taylor as Constable Gottlieb
- Joe Bugner as 'Crusher' Harris
- Patrick Ward as Sheedy
- Kim Krejus as Bonnie
