= Human Error (TV series) =

Australian crime drama series

- Created by: Greg Haddrick; Samantha Winston; Gregor Jordan
- Written by: Greg Haddrick; Samantha Winston; Gregor Jordan
- Directed by: Fiona Banks; Mat King
- Starring: Leeanna Walsman; Steve Peacocke; Rahel Romahn; Matt Day; Rob Collins; Steve Bisley
- Country of origin: Australia
- Original language: English
- No. of seasons: 1
- No. of episodes: 6

Production
- Executive producers: John Edwards; Dan Edwards; Andy Ryan
- Producers: Greg Haddrick; Samantha Winston
- Production locations: Melbourne, Victoria, Australia
- Running time: 50 minutes
- Production company: Roadshow Rough Diamond Entertainment

Original release
- Network: Nine Network
- Release: 11 September – 16 October 2024

Human Error is an Australian television crime drama for the Nine Network, released on 11 September 2024. Created by Greg Haddick, the series follows the life of police officer Holly O'Rourke and her police team with a case that could ruin Holly's reputation and career. Holly wants to redeem herself with the investigation, but as lies unravel the race to catch a killer is underway.

== Plot ==
Inspired by true events, Holly O'Rourke (Leeanna Walsman) begins investigating a gangland murder that turns her whole life upside down. As the murder becomes to be a case of mistaken identity the investigation threatens to destroy her career as a conspiracy and a deeper plot emerges, with police on edge and a killer on the loose the team must find the killer hiding in plain site. All whilst Holly's family life is crumbling around her, when she discovers she is pregnant with another man's baby.

== Cast ==
The cast for the series was announced on 2 February 2023 as production commenced.

- Leeanna Walsman as Holly O'Rourke
- Steve Peacocke as Dylan McKenzie
- Rahel Romahn as Jarred Pines
- Matt Day as Luke O'Rourke
- Steve Bisley as Bear O'Rourke
- Anthony J Sharpe as Keith Bird
- Daniela Farinacci as Chief Kirsten Leigh
- Ethan Lwin as Gabe Kihn
- Emily Joy as Maia Kirsner
- Rosie Mitchell as Alice
- Jane Allsop as Bianca
- Gyton Grantley as Allan Carter

== Production ==
On 14 September 2022, the six-part series was greenlit for production by Screen Australia, receiving support from VicScreen.

The series would go into production several months later in February 2023.

Human Error was set to lead the 2023 Nine Network drama slate but was ultimately pushed back until the following year, due to Nine airing the Warnie tele-movie.

== Reception ==
David Knox of TV Tonight gave the series a 4 star rating saying that Walsman delivered at every turn and the cast complemented their roles perfectly.

On 20 September 2024, Channel 9 had made all episodes of the series available on 9Now.

== Episodes ==
=== Season 1 (2024) ===
| No. overall | No. in season | Title | Directed by | Written by | Original release date | Aus. viewers |
|---|---|---|---|---|---|---|
| 1 | 1 | "Episode 1" | Fiona Banks | Samantha Winston | 11 September 2024 | 501,000 |
| 2 | 2 | "Episode 2" | Fiona Banks | Samantha Winston | 19 September 2024 | 467,000 |
| 3 | 3 | "Episode 3" | Fiona Banks | Greg Haddrick | 25 September 2024 | 465,000 |
| 4 | 4 | "Episode 4" | Mat King | Greg Haddrick | 2 October 2024 | 433,000 |
| 5 | 5 | "Episode 5" | Mat King | Samantha Winston | 9 October 2024 | 503,000 |
| 6 | 6 | "Episode 6" | Mat King | Samantha Winston | 16 October 2024 | 463,000 |

== Accolades ==
| Year | Work | Award | Category | Result | Ref. |
|---|---|---|---|---|---|
| 2024 | Human Error | Casting Guild of Australia | Best Casting in a Telemovie/Miniseries | Nominated | |
| 2025 | Human Error | AACTA Awards | Best Miniseries | Nominated | |
| 2025 | Human Error | Logie Awards | Best Miniseries or Telemovie | Nominated | |
