= Leeanna Walsman =

Australian actress (born 1979)

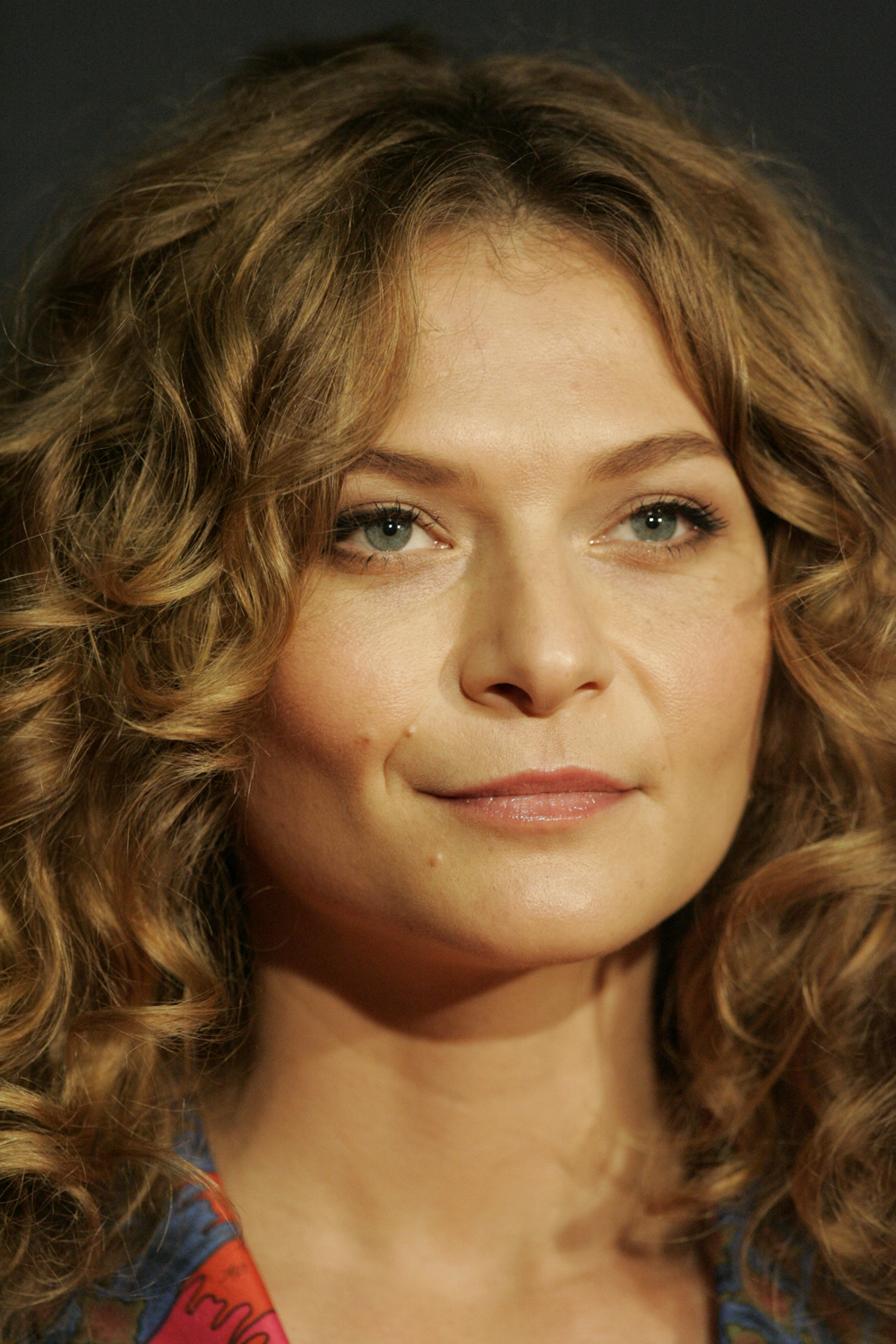
- Walsman in February 2013
- Born: November 22, 1979 (age 46); Sydney, Australia
- Occupation: Actress
- Years active: 1996–present
- Known for: Star Wars: Episode II – Attack of the Clones; Human Error; Wentworth

Leeanna Walsman is an Australian actress. She is best known for her role as Zam Wesell in Star Wars: Episode II – Attack of the Clones (2002), and for her roles in the 2000 film Looking for Alibrandi and the television series Wentworth. She was nominated for both AACTA and Logie awards for her role in Emmy Award-winning series Safe Harbour.

== Early life ==
Walsman was born in Sydney, Australia.

== Career ==
Walsman commenced her acting career 1996, when she made a guest appearance in drama series Police Rescue, followed by further guest roles on shows, such as, Big Sky and Murder Call. During which time, Walsman made her feature film debut in Steven Vidler's 1997 drama Blackrock. She continued to appear in guest spots on several drama series, including Wildside, Home and Away, Heartbreak High, as well as fantasy shows, Farscape and Beastmaster.

Walsman was cast in Star Wars: Episode II – Attack of the Clones (2002), as Zam Wesell. In the 2000s, her television roles consisted of appearances in Young Lions, White Collar Blue, and All Saints, and the miniseries Jessica, which is based on the novel by Bryce Courtenay, Hercules, The Starter Wife and the war drama The Pacific.

In 2012, Walsman was cast in the Foxtel prison drama series Wentworth, as governor Erica Davidson. The series, which first went to air in 2013, is a reimagining of the Network Ten soap opera/drama Prisoner, in which the character of Erica was portrayed by Patsy King in the original series. Walsman only appeared in the show's first season.

In 2015, she had a supporting role in Home and Away: An Eye for an Eye, a special episode of the soap opera which streamed on the now-defunct service Presto, and subsequently appearances in drama series, Janet King, Cleverman, Seven Types of Ambiguity and miniseries Safe Harbour.

In February 2023 it was announced that channel 9 drama Human Error would go into production with Walsman in the lead role. In 2024, it was announced that drama series Human Error would air on the Nine Network.

== Awards ==
In 2005, she was nominated for the Logie Award for Most Outstanding Actress in a Drama Series for her work on Jessica, losing to Miranda Otto.

She has also been nominated for two AFI Awards and an IF Award.

She had three FCCA award nominations for Bitter & Twister, Manny Lewis, and Bosch & Rockit.

In 2018, she was nominated for an AACTA award for best lead actress, and Logie Award for Most Outstanding Actress, for her role in Safe Harbour.

== Filmography ==
=== Film ===
Year	Title	Role	Notes
1997	Blackrock	Shana	Feature film
2000	Looking for Alibrandi	Carly Bishop	Feature film
2002	Star Wars: Episode II – Attack of the Clones	Zam Wesell	Feature film
2004	One Perfect Day	Alysse Green	Feature film
2006	Ezra White, LL.B.	Louise White	Short film
2006	Burst	Angel	Short film
2007	Soul Mates	Rachel	Short film
2008	Bitter & Twisted	Indigo Samvini	Feature film
2008	$9.99	Tanita (voice)	Feature film (animated)
2008	The Informant	Heidi Oliver	TV film
2010	Caught Inside	Alex	Feature film
2010	Kissing Point	Sarah Logan	Short film
2011	Home	Voice	Short film
2011	Dance Me to the End of Love	Mary	Short film
2012	Suspended	Michelle	Short film
2013	The Fort	Darcy	Short film
2013	My Mother Her Daughter	Lynette	Short film
2015	Manny Lewis	Maria	Feature film
2015	Touch	Dawn	Feature film
2015	Unified		Short film
2017	Don't Tell (2017 film)	Wendy Roche	Feature film
2020	Penguin Bloom	Kylie	Feature film
2020	2067	Selene Whyte	Feature film
2022	Bosch & Rockit	Elizabeth	Feature film

=== Television ===
Year	Title	Role	Notes	Ref
1996	Police Rescue	Debbie	Episode: "Tomorrow Never Knows"	
1997	Big Sky	Rachel	Episode: "Paradise"	
1997	Spellbinder: Land of the Dragon Lord	Girl	Episode: "Sun Becomes a Star"	
1997	Murder Call	Camilla Collins	Episode: "Blood Heat"	
1998	Wildside	Jo	Episode #1.15	
1998	Home and Away	Barbie	Season 11, episodes 217 & 218	
1999	Heartbreak High	Jet	Season 7, episodes 1-4	
1999	Thunderstone	Myah		
2001	Farscape	Borlik	Episode: "Suns and Lovers"	
2001	Love Is a Four Letter Word	Larissa Barrett		
2001	BeastMaster	Morah	Episode: "Chosen One"	
2002	Young Lions	Freda Larsen	Episode #1.4	
2003	White Collar Blue	Angie	Episode #2.3	
2003	The Shark Net	Ruth Parnham	Miniseries	
2004	Jessica	Jessica Bergman	Miniseries	
2005	Hercules	Megara (wife of Heracles)	Miniseries	
2006	All Saints	Sophie Celna / Michelle	Episode: "Behind Closed Doors"	
2007	The Starter Wife	Sasha	Miniseries	
2009	Rogue Nation	Mary Putland	Episode: "Honour Among Thieves"	
2010	The Pacific	Cpl. Lucy Otis	Episode: "Iwo Jima"	
2012	Underbelly: Badness	Det. Sergeant Pam Young	Recurring role	
2013	Wentworth	Erica Davidson	Season 1, main role	
2015	Catching Milat	Shirley Soires	TV miniseries	
2015	Home and Away: An Eye for an Eye	Virginia Eisak	Streaming special	
2016	Janet King	Peta Vickers	Season 2, 7 episodes	
2016	Cleverman	Belinda Frosche	Episode #1.1	
2017	Seven Types of Ambiguity	Anna Marin	Miniseries	
2018	Safe Harbour	Bree Gallagher	Miniseries	
2020	Drunk History Australia	Lillian Armfield	Episode #1.6	
2021	Eden	Octavia Gracie	5 episodes	
2021	Preppers	Clementine	1 episode	
2024	Human Error	Holly O'Rourke	Main role	
2024	Nautilus	Hilda	TV series: 1 episode	
2026	NCIS: Sydney	Phoebe Bale (Emily Marx)	TV series: 1 episode (3.14 Death Card)	

=== Video games ===
Year	Title	Voice role	Notes
2002	Star Wars: Bounty Hunter	Zam Wesell	
2022	Lego Star Wars: The Skywalker Saga	Zam Wesell	

== Stage ==
Year	Title	Role	Notes	Ref
2022	Opening Night	Myrtle Gordon	Belvoir Street Theatre	
2018	Melancholia	Claire	Malthouse Theatre	
2010	Stockholm	Kali	STC	
