= Noah and Saskia =

Australian children's television series

- From left to right: Noah, CGI and real Max Hammer, real and CGI Indy, Saskia
- Genre: Teen's
- Created by: Patricia Edgar; Chris Anastassiades; Paul Nichola
- Directed by: Pino Amenta
- Starring: Jack Blumenau; Hannah Greenwood; Cameron Nugent; Hayden Rathbone; Adrian Fergus Fuller; Emily Wheaton; Alex Yates; Maria Papas
- Countries of origin: Australia; United Kingdom
- Original language: English
- No. of seasons: 1
- No. of episodes: 13

Production
- Executive producers: Patricia Edgar (ABC); Elaine Sperber (BBC)
- Producer: Patricia Edgar
- Running time: 24 minutes

Original release
- Network: ABC; CBBC
- Release: 4 May 2004

Noah and Saskia is a 13-episode TV program initiated, developed and produced by Patricia Edgar for the Australian Children's Television Foundation (ACTF) and the BBC as she stepped down after 20 years as Founding Director of the ACTF. The 13 x 24-minute drama series involves an Australian teenage girl, Saskia, and her internet-based relationship with Noah, a teenage boy living in the United Kingdom. The two characters project their ideal selves to each other in a virtual world, and in the process get a little closer to reaching their ideals in the real one. The show is about the power of someone's essence and how someone can touch you from 10,000 miles away, and change your whole life. Noah & Saskia speaks directly to today's young people about the technologies which are changing the way we communicate.

"I wanted one more crack at producing the type of television I had always believed in; not a formulaic soap-style series; not a co-produced mid-Pacific blancmange, but something that really spoke to adolescents about the issues that were on their minds," Patricia Edgar, Bloodbath: a memoir of Australian Television, pg.399 . "The Internet was the place to set much of the action as this allowed for a modern, contemporary story, which would be new territory for drama. The other appeal of online chat spaces was that they give the characters opportunities to express themselves in multiple ways. The Net is a space where young people are much more at home than their parents and increasingly it will be their world", Patricia Edgar.

Noah and Saskia commenced production in May 2003. It premiered and screened in Australia on the ABC and in the United Kingdom on the BBC in 2004.

== Cast ==
- Noah King – Jack Blumenau – a socially inexperienced boy from London, England. He lives with his mother, football-loving father and brother and later his cousin Eddie. He runs a webcomic called "Max Hammer", which is based on his life and the people around him. Later in the series, his personality changes into becoming more like Max, such as spending less time online, getting a girlfriend for a time and even playing football.
- Saskia Litras – Hannah Greenwood – A shy, musical girl from Melbourne, Australia. She lives with her single mother, works at the Chicken Coop after school. Her original reason for creating the character of Indy was to confront Max for stealing some of her music illegally, although this leads her to become Noah's partner in his webcomic "Max Hammer". As the series progresses, her personality changes into more like being Indy, such as playing music in public and even becoming more confident at school. At first, she had a crush on Max, but those feelings faded for a time when Max told her he only thought of her as a friend.
- Max Hammer – Cameron Nugent
- Indy – Teiya Moquiuti
- Renee – Emily Wheaton
- Clive – Adrian Fergus Fuller
- Specs – Alex Yates
- Eddie – Eugene Simon
- Deb Litras – Tracy Mann
- Ernesto – Bernard Angel
- Benny – Julian O'Donnell
- Gerald – Damian Neate
- Theresa – Alicia Gardiner

== Synopsis ==
Noah and Saskia is about an internet relationship between two teenagers and its effects on their lives. Although the teenagers deceive each other with "false personas", their relationship is shown to be positive and important. By projecting their ideal selves in a virtual world, the relationship between the two teenagers change each other's lives from opposite sides of the globe.

Saskia goes into an Internet chatroom called Webweave seeking revenge on a guy who stole her music and ends up starting one of the most important relationships of her life. After meeting Max Hammer (the guy who stole her music) for the first time, she feels as though she has known him her entire life. He appears to know all that is going on in her head, her music and best of all, her soul. Max Hammer is strong, smart, sensible and sensitive and sees those qualities in Saskia herself. Saskia feels that her new relationship with Max Hammer is absolutely perfect, except for the fact that he's in the UK and she's in Australia...and that he thinks she's someone else entirely. Saskia goes by the online name of Indy, and she finds that her alter ego allows her to express aspects of her personality that she is uncomfortable with or unable to express normally. Indy is confident and sexy whereas Saskia is nervous and shy. By asking herself "What would Indy do?", Saskia learns to be more assertive and, in some ways, becomes Indy herself. Saskia knows that her relationship with Max would be over if he ever found out that she was actually a 14-year-old dork, but Max Hammer isn't who he claims to be either. Turns out he's actually a 14-year-old science dweeb called Noah who knows that Indy would run screaming if she ever learned the truth about Max Hammer.

== Production ==
The series was produced as a co-production with the BBC, with seven episodes of the series filmed in Australia, and six in the United Kingdom. Patricia Edgar was the Producer and Executive Producer of the series and Elisa Argenzio was the Line Producer for the series. The series was pre-sold to the ABC in Australia, and the Foundation distributed the series worldwide [excluding the United Kingdom]. The Australian Film Finance Corporation and Film Victoria were also investors in the series. Noah & Saskia commenced pre-production in February 2003 and was the Foundation's major project in production for the following financial year.

The idea for the series came to Patricia at the turn of the 20th century, when digital media was still in its infancy. She wanted to integrate the Kahootz software that she and Paul Nichola had developed for the ACTF into the series, as well as other new technologies so that the production of the program explored the potential of digital production.

"The series straddles three worlds – England, Australia, and cyberspace- as well as the fantasy space inside Noah and Saskia's minds where their alter egos live. The program asks: 'Who do you want to be? How do you want to present yourself? How much do you want others to know about you? At one level it is 'a boy meets girl story' but it is asking profound questions that young people struggle with, about 'the self' and about how you form relationships." Patricia Edgar, Bloodbath: a memoir of Australian Television.

The series focuses on the introspective side of a teenager's life, and this is achieved visually by blending live action, animation and visual effects. Episodes alternate between Australia and the United Kingdom, providing contrasts between the characters day-to-day lives. Webweave, where the characters chat online, was created using the ACTF's Kahootz software package.

=== Writing ===
Patricia Edgar hosted a writers' workshop to commence development of the concept for the new series in February 2000. She said that being able to take an abstract philosophical concept and turn it into a story with characters that are appealing is difficult for any writer. Claire Henderson and Tammy Burnstock, from the ABC, and Elaine Sperber, from the BBC, participated in the writers' workshop. Chris Anastassiades and Robert Greenberg were commissioned to develop the concept further and continued to write scripts for the series the following year. The BBC, which was interested in the potential of the concept for Noah & Saskia also agreed to invest further development of the scripts in 2000.

Chris Anastassiades, Robert Greenberg and Philip Dalkin went on to further develop the concept and wrote a number of scripts in 2001. A writers' workshop then refined the concept and a team of writers which included John Armstrong and Sam Carroll were then commissioned to write further episodes.

"The central idea sounds simple, but as the concept developed, we also started to explore the notion of self-revelation. Could our two characters become such good friends precisely because they would never actually have to meet in person? Would they hide behind the idealised selves they'd created on the Internet, or gradually come to trust each other more because they felt safe from the usual peer group pressures and scrutiny?” Elaine Sperber, Head of Children's Drama at the BBC.

Paul Nichola became part of the development team to devise the Web World (WebWeave) for the series and the visual effects to integrate the story ideas. In the process, the Kahootz software was to be applied and further developed. Ultimately, the project would be achieved at a low cost, but would look like expensive high-end projects using visual and digital effects.

=== Filming ===
Each episode of the show follows one of the main characters in their home country - Saskia in Australia, or Noah in England. Each country has an independent cast. As a result, the two main characters never met before or during the production. Moreover, all of the Australian footage was filmed before Jack Blumenau had been cast as Noah. Furthermore, the two-halves are very different stylistically; Saskia directly addresses the camera and has flashbacks and daydreams, while Noah's side is shown objectively.

Casting for the UK-based characters took place in July 2003. The Australian portion of the shoot was completed in 2003 and production moved to the United Kingdom in August 2003. The UK shoot commenced on 4 August, and continued for six weeks. It was the first time an ACTF series was filmed on location outside Australia. Patricia Edgar and Pino Amenta, series' Director, worked in the UK with the BBC crew to shoot the six episodes featuring Noah and his story. The BBC's Jane Stevenson was the UK Producer.

Noah and Saskia meet in person in the last episode of the series. However, the scene was created digitally after filming Jack Blumenau and Hannah Greenwood separately. In the final shot of this scene Noah and Saskia are standing face to face. When Hannah Greenwood filmed this shot, Noah had not been cast. To ensure the two characters appeared to be looking directly at each other, three different versions of Saskia's half of this shot were filmed, with Hannah Greenwood looking at Noah stand-ins of three different heights.

To bring Noah & Saskia's world of real teens and cyber dual identities to life, the production team used a combination of live-action, animation and visual effects.

Throughout the series, the actors playing Noah and Saskia interact with live action versions of Indy and Max Hammer in "real life" settings, while animated versions of Indy and Max separately interact with each other in a number of animated internet environments, including an online chat-room called "Web Weave". Distinctive looks were carefully designed for each of the various live action and animated environments, so that shifts in perspective throughout the story are instantly recognisable to the audience.

Headed up by Noah & Saskia's Visual Effects Director, Paul Nichola, the team producing the animated sequences and visual effects combines the skills of the ACTF's New Media development team and Melbourne-based animation and effects studio Unreal pictures. In addition to traditional animation and visual effects techniques such as CGI, motion capture and split-screen, the team adapted the ACTF's own 3D animation software Kahootz to create a unique look for scenes set in the "Web Weave" chat space.

"The amazing variety of online worlds we are creating, combined with the visual effects which are scattered throughout the show, made the series a challenging and involving viewing experience for this generation of kids, who are more visually agile than ever before", Paul Nichola.

=== Premiere ===
The ACTF's children's drama series, Noah & Saskia premiered with a special one hour episode on the ABC on 4 May 2004 at 5pm. It then screened on the ABC from 4 May to 29 June 2004 at 5:30pm.

The ABC, supported its Australian broadcast with the release of a Noah & Saskia DVD package containing extra features, a Noah & Saskia novel (by Chris Anastassiades and Sam Carroll) and the www.noahandsaskia.com website featuring discussion boards, behind the scenes information and animation tools.

== Success ==
In 2002, Patricia Edgar stood down as Director after 20 years to focus on the production of Noah and Saskia, which was to be her parting gift to the ACTF.

In May 2004, the series attracted approximately 60% of the 5-12-year-old viewing audience and approximately 40% of the 13-17-year-old audience, lifting the overall ratings in that time slot for the ABC. The series performed particularly well in the Brisbane, Adelaide and Perth markets, the latter averaging over 75% of all viewers between 5-12-year olds.

The series was released internationally at MIP TV with immediate impact in 2004. The series sold to BBC Canada (Canada) and Cartoon Network (for India, Pakistan, Bangladesh, Maldives, Nepal, Bhutan and Sri Lanka). Noah & Saskia video/DVD, publishing and music rights were sold to ABC Enterprises (Australia).

Noah & Saskia screened at the 2004 Chicago Film Festival in the Live-Action Television Category. The series was selected from 700 entries from around the world. The Chicago International Children's Film Festival (CICFF) is the world's largest and oldest annual festival of films for children and features over 200 of the best live-action and animated films from 40 countries. The Festival's aim is to empower children with knowledge from viewing quality and culturally diverse films. The nominated programs were screened and judged by a child audience along with the official Festival panel.

Noah & Saskia was nominated for two Australian Film Institute (AFI) Awards and won an Australian Writers' Guild (AWGIE) Award. The two AFI nominations were for 'Best Children's Television Drama Award' and 'Outstanding Achievement in Craft in Television Award' for animation and digital effects.

On 22 October 2004, Sam Carroll, co-writer of Noah & Saskia, won the AWGIE Award for 'Best Children's Television Drama' (C Classification) for the episode "Extra Spicy". The announcement was made at the Regent Theatre in Melbourne during the 37th Annual AWGIE Awards.

Visual Effects Director, Paul Nichola brought together the combined skills of the ACTF's New Media development team and Melbourne-based animation and effects studio Unreal pictures. In addition to traditional animation and visual effects techniques such as CGI, motion capture and split-screen, the team adapted the ACTF's ground-breaking animation software Kahootz to create a unique look for scenes set in the webweave chat space.

The series written jointly by Chris Anastassiades and Sam Carroll also received an 'Honourable Mention' at the 2004 Chris Awards at the Columbus International Film & Video Festival.

=== Website ===
ABC New Media created a website, at noahandsaskia.com, to complement the television series. The website went live on 3 May 2004. Visitors to the website were able to create their own "Max hammer" comics, experience the "webweave" online environment and create music online.

=== Merchandise ===
A Noah & Saskia book, published by ABC Books and a DVD set, complete with entertaining extras, was available in ABC shops and ABC centres from the middle of May 2004.

Along with a novel and accompanying teaching resources, Noah and Saskia is a unique educational package for English text studies, multiliteracies, Internet issues, media production and ICTs. Curriculum resources, developed in partnership with the Australian Literacy Educators' Association (ALEA) and the Australian Association for the Teaching of English (AATE) included:

- English and multiliteracies lessons
- The entire production process from script to screen available on CD-ROM and at the learning Centre at www.actf.com.au
- Trailer and extra scenes on the DVD

The ACTF released its educational package of Noah & Saskia for Australian schools with all 13 episodes available on video and DVD. As a special feature for the education sector, the DVD includes "The Making of Noah & Saskia". A CD-ROM completes the educational package detailing the production process in "From Script to Screen" plus comprehensive lesson plans, worksheets, video clips and TV scripts.

== Reviews ==
"A rich and exciting blend of live action, animation and visual effects, Noah & Saskia is a welcome and innovative new series". Sunday Times, WA

"It seems kids are better served by Australian drama than adults are". The Age, Vic

"Intriguing and definitely something we have not seen on the box before". West Australian, WA

"I luv Saskia’s style…she doesn’t care what people think about the way she looks. It totally rocks!!!!” Bree, www.noahandsaskia.com

"The central idea sounds simple, but as the concept developed, we also started to explore the notion of self-revelation…would Noah and Saskia hide behind the idealised selves they had created on the internet, or gradually come to trust each other…” Elaine Sperber, Head of Children’s Drama, BBC

"Noah & Saskia is a truly innovative and exciting series. It is very pleasing to be part of a program that breaks new ground in the field of children’s drama". Claire Henderson, head of Children’s Television, ABC

== Awards and nominations ==
Year	Nominated work	Award Event	Category	Result	Reference
2004	Noah & Saskia	29th Gold Chest Awards, Bulgaria		Nominated	
2004	Noah & Saskia	The Chris Awards, Columbus, United States		Honourable mention	
2004	Paul Nichola	AFI Awards, Melbourne	Animation and Digital Effects	Nominated	
2004	Noah & Saskia	AFI Awards, Melbourne	Best Children's Drama	Nominated	
2004	Noah & Saskia	Banff Rockie Awards, Canada	Children's Program	Finalist	
2004	Sam Carroll, co-writer of Noah & Saskia for episode 'Extra Spicy'	AWGIE Award		Winner	
2004	Noah & Saskia	Chicago International Children's Film Festival	Live Action Television	Selected for screening	
2005	Noah & Saskia	Logie Award	Most Outstanding Children's Program Australia	Finalist	

== Also known as ==
- Um Par Quase Perfeito (Brazilian Portuguese)
- Ной и Саския (Russian)
