= Touch (2014 film) =

2014 film

- Directed by: Christopher Houghton
- Written by: Christopher Houghton
- Produced by: Julie Byrne
- Starring: Leeanna Walsman; Onor Nottle
- Cinematography: Aaron Gully
- Edited by: David Banbury
- Music by: Kyls Burtland
- Release date: 2014
- Running time: 86 minutes
- Country: Australia
- Language: English
- Budget: $480,000

Touch is a 2014 Australian film written and directed by Christopher Houghton. It premiered at Sydney Film Festival in 2014 and was released into cinemas in 2015.

== Cast ==
- Leeanna Walsman as Dawn
- John Crouch as Barry
- Onor Nottle as Steph
- Matt Day as John
- Greg Hatton as Nick
- Shane Connor as Carl

== Reception ==
Jake Wilson in the Sydney Morning Herald gave it 2 stars and says "the biggest problem is a storyline more suited to a short than a feature." David Stratton, writing for the Australian, gave it 3 1/2 stars. He calls it "a well made and rather creepy drama that withholds a good deal of information from the audience yet succeeds in its portrayal of a woman at the end of her tether." Glam Adelaide's Nathan Giaccio gave it 7/10 and believes it should have been shorter. He finishes "Houghton has shaped a telling and memorable tale of love, loss, and the psychosis of grief, that will certainly leave you with questions, and just a hint of sorrow." Frank Hatherly on Screen Daily writes "Touch is a compelling, cryptic movie that should ideally be seen without any idea what to expect."
