= Jack Finsterer =

Australian actor

- Born: John Finsterer; 1968 (age 57–58); Canberra, Australian Capital Territory, Australia
- Occupation: Actor
- Spouse: Justine Clarke (m. 1999)
- Children: 3
- Relatives: Anni Finsterer (sister)

Jack Finsterer (born 1968) is an Australian film and television actor. He has been acting since the age of 25 and has appeared in some of Australia's best-known television series and films since 1993.

== Early life ==
Finsterer was born John Finsterer in 1968. He grew up in Dickson, Canberra, where he attended Daramalan College.

Finsterer worked as a labourer in Sydney, before taking up acting. He studied at the Victorian College of the Arts for three years. His sister Anni Finsterer is also an actor, who has appeared in To Have and To Hold and State Coroner.

== Career ==
Finsterer's screen debut was in the film Gross Misconduct in 1993, playing the role of a policeman. His first significant acting role, however, was as the character Bobby Webster in the 1994 television series Law of the Land. The same year, he appeared in the TV series Janus (1994–95). In September 1996, he joined the supporting cast of police drama Blue Heelers for a month as DC Johnny Kowalski. He also appeared in a five-month outdoor stage production of Romeo and Juliet in Sydney, alongside Nadine Garner.

Film appearances include Zone 39, Preservation (2003), Dangerous (2007), and his best known role to date as Jack Scholt in the Australian historical film Kokoda (2006), which made $3,138,501 at the box office in Australia. He also performed voice-over work in short film The Hunter (2011).

In 2020, Finsterer appeared in Home and Away as Paul, a criminal who blackmails the Parata family.

== Personal life ==
In 1999, Finsterer married fellow Australian actress Justine Clarke who is also a singer, musician, and television host.

Finsterer and Clarke have three children.

He and his family live in Sydney.

Away from acting, Finsterer has worked in a Melbourne wine shop, started a business selling beauty products, and worked in corporate hospitality at the Sydney Cricket Ground.

== Filmography ==
=== Television ===
Year	Title	Role	Notes
1992	Neighbours	Russell Sykes	Recurring
1994	Law of the Land	Bobby Webster	Season 3, episode: "Whisper"
1994–1995	Janus	Bronowski	10 episodes
1996	Blue Heelers	Det. Const. Johnny Kowalski	4 episodes
1998	Good Guys, Bad Guys	Christie Maginnis	Episode: "Blood is Thicker than Walter"
1999	Stingers	Patrick De Groot	2 episodes
2001	Love Is a Four Letter Word	Evan Green	5 episodes
2002	Tanya and Floyd	Floyd	TV movie
2002	The Lost World	Captain Melric	Episode: "Phantoms"
2002	Farscape	Gleeg	Episode: "Lava’s a Many Splendoured Thing"
2001–2002	McLeod's Daughters	Marty O'Rourke	2 episodes
2002	Young Lions	Tony Kennedy	Episode: "Lone Star Blues"
2003	Life Support	Dr. Rudi	10 episodes
2004	Jessica	Michael Malloy	TV movie
2004	Big Reef	Nick	TV movie
2005–2006	All Saints	Damien Trelawny	2 episodes
2007	Dangerous	Nathan Walsh	8 episodes
2008	Dream Life	Number 11	TV movie
2010	Sea Patrol	Karl Butherworth	Episode: "Big Fish"
2010	City Homicide	Jeremy Burns	2 episodes
2010	Rush	Michael Shmitt	Episode #3.20
2011	Neighbours	Garland Cole	Recurring
2012	Miss Fisher's Murder Mysteries	Peter the Painter	Episode: "Death at Victoria Dock"
2013	Mr & Mrs Murder	Dwayne Nash	Episode: "A Dog’s Life"
2014	The Doctor Blake Mysteries	Lyle Townsend	Episode: "Smoke and Mirrors"
2020–2021	Home and Away	Paul	10 episodes

=== Film ===
Year	Title	Role	Notes
1993	Gross Misconduct	Policeman	Feature film
1996	Zone 39	Central Officer	Feature film
1998	Tulip	Jack	Short film
1999	Strange Fits of Passion	Francis	Feature film
2003	Preservation	Nick	
2003	Car Park	Jack	Short film
2006	Kokoda	Jack Scholt	Feature film
2008	Outside in	Daniel	Short film
2009	Schadenfreude		Short film
2009	In Her Skin	Police Detective Neil Patterson	Feature film
2011	The Hunter	The Hunter (voice)	Short film
2011	Spider Walk	Joe	Short film
2013	Destiny in the Dirt	John	Short film
2013	Revolving Doors	Hotel Check-in Desk Attendant	Short film
2015	Is This the Real World	Edgo	
2020	Bloody Hell	Uncle	Feature film
2022	Ishmael	Ishmael	Short film
2022	All Silent Dogs	Mycah	Short film
