= Heartland (Australian TV series) =

Australian television drama series

- Also known as: Burned Bridge
- Genre: Drama
- Written by: John Cundill; Ernie Dingo
- Directed by: Paul Faint; Scott Hartford-Davis; Kate Woods
- Country of origin: Australia
- Original language: English
- No. of seasons: 1
- No. of episodes: 13

Production
- Running time: 50 minutes
- Production company: Northway Productions

Original release
- Network: ABC
- Release: 23 March – 1 June 1994

Heartland, known as Burned Bridge in some countries, is an Australian television drama series that ran on ABC Television in 1994. It ran for 13 episodes and starred Cate Blanchett and Ernie Dingo, as well as a large number of Aboriginal Australian actors.

== Plot ==
Heartland deals with the mystery surrounding the death of an Aboriginal girl and the doubts concerning the guilt of her boyfriend, who is arrested for her murder. It is also a love story between two of the people convinced of his innocence — their growing relationship must survive hostility from both the white and black communities and the obstacles of their different backgrounds, attitudes and cultures.

Set in a small coastal town against the turmoils of murder, mystery and romance, Heartland follows the people from this seaside community and their battle to restructure their own way of life. Their struggle to restore their self-esteem towards a positive future, despite the obstacles in their path.

Other plot elements revolve around the character of Elizabeth Ashton, a writer arriving in a small coastal community. A degree of suspicion exists towards the newcomer who is ignorant of any underlying racial tensions. This naivety allows her to more easily befriend local Aboriginal man Vincent Burunga. Into this mix is the local police officer Phil McCarthy who seeks Ashton's affections whilst being hostile to her friendship with Burunga, not just as a rival suitor, but because of racial prejudice.

== Cast ==
=== Main cast ===
- Ernie Dingo as Vincent Burunga
- Cate Blanchett as Elizabeth Ashton
- Bob Maza as Alf Dyer
- Justine Saunders as Millie Carmichael
- Steven Vidler as Phil McCarthy

=== Supporting cast ===
- Shane Connor as Ben Lovell
- David Ngoombujarra as Mujadi Burunga
- Jeremy Sims as Garth Maddern
- Paul Caesar as Macka Hargraves
- Bradley Byquar as Ricky Dyer
- Wes Patten as Chris Dyer
- Rachael Maza as Leila Sutton
- David Kennedy as Robert Sutton
- Aaron Pedersen as Clarrie Carmichael
- Lillian Crombie as Mary Dyer
- Zoe Carides as Shelley
- Luke Carroll as Jason Sutton
- Shane Connor as Ben Lovell
- Trevor Jamieson as Nobby
- Rhoda Roberts as Dionne
- Darren Yap as Dr Nguyen
- David Wenham as Warwick Bone
- Melissa Jaffer as Meredith Lovell
- Harold Hopkins as Jim
- Richard Carter as Merv
- Danielle Carter as Receptionist
- Genevieve Lemon as Fiona Lovell
- Kerry Walker as Sylvia
- Gary Waddell as Lennie

== Production ==
The series was groundbreaking in that it was the first major TV series to be written by Aboriginal Australians, as well as starring many Aboriginal people. It was also one of Cate Blanchett's first appearances on screen, along with a number of other talented Aboriginal actors who went on to have successful careers. Rachael Maza and Lillian Crombie, who had attended acting school together, had their first screen roles in the series.

== Accolades ==
In 1994, Heartland won the Human Rights and Equal Opportunity Commission TV Drama Award, which was presented to executive producers Penny Chapman and Bruce West

Episode 7 won both Best Achievement in Direction in Television Drama, for Julian Pringle, and the Best Episode in Television Drama at the AFI Awards in 1994.

The series was nominated for Most Popular Drama at the 1995 Logie Awards.

At the ARIA Music Awards of 1995, the show's soundtrack was nominated for Best Original Soundtrack, Cast or Show Album.

== See also ==
- List of Australian television series
