= Bruno Lucia =

Australian stand-up comedian, actor and performer

- Born: 27 January 1960 (age 66); Adelaide, South Australia, Australia

Comedy career
- Years active: 1970s-present
- Medium: television, stage
- Genre: stand-up
- Website: http://www.brunolucia.com/

Bruno Lucia is an Australian stand-up comedian, actor and performer.

== Background ==
Hailing from Adelaide, Lucia was born on 27 January 1960 and is of Italian descent.

== Career ==
=== Stand-up comedy ===
Bruno began his comedy career at the Sydney Comedy Store in 1986 with the character Dino Valentino. He has since performed at the Melbourne International Comedy Festival, Adelaide Fringe, and Sydney Comedy Festival, as well as touring solo around Australia. He was notably part of the successful Great Australian Comedy Show with Eric Bana, Russell Gilbert, Vince Sorrenti, Elliot Goblet and Scared Weird Little Guys in the late 1990s.

He moved to London in 1998, where he regularly performed the live stand-up circuit and toured Ireland, Holland, Scotland, Hong Kong, and Bangkok. In Los Angeles, he was a regular at a number of venues and also performed in New York and Las Vegas. He has also played in Amsterdam, Hong Kong, Bangkok, Papua New Guinea and New Zealand. Notable international appearances include Rascals Comedy Hour on HBO (USA), Catch a Rising Star (New York), the Comedy Store (Los Angeles), Live at Jongleurs (on UK Gold), and the Comedy Store (London).

In 2010 Lucia was based in Los Angeles, touring and performing comedy and musical comedy internationally.

=== Acting ===
Lucia rose to popularity in the early 1990s with his role as sleazy entertainment agent Wayne Lovett on the Channel 9 television sitcom All Together Now (with Jon English and Rebecca Gibney), memorable in part due to his character's iconic catchphrase "Chickybabe!"

Lucia has also featured in many dramatic roles, acting in television series such as Stingers, A Country Practice and Ring of Scorpio. Film appearances include Sweet Talker, The Time Guardian and Love's Brother.

=== Music ===
Lucia is also a musician and songwriter, having performed professionally in Australia for ten years, supporting artists such as George Benson, Madness, The B-52s, Joan Armatrading, José Feliciano, Midnight Oil, Cold Chisel and Crowded House.

== Filmography ==
=== Film ===
Year	Title	Role	Type
1987	The Lighthorsemen	Abdul	Feature film
1987	The Time Guardian	Commando Dion Zees	Feature film
1991	Sweet Talker	Mr John Thomas	Feature film
2004	Love's Brother	Paolo	Feature film
2013	The Claw 2	Special Agent 199	Short film
	The Big	Dino Valentino	Short film

=== Television ===
Year	Title	Role	Type
	Carson's Law	Guest role	TV series
1984	Special Squad	Guest role	TV series
	The Fast Lane	Guest role	TV series
1985	The Dunera Boys	Abe Joelstein (uncredited)	TV miniseries
1989	Rafferty's Rules	Franco Scali	TV series, season 5, episode 14: "Whistling in the Dark"
1990	A Country Practice	Mystery Patient	TV series, season 10, episode 4: "Anna and the King: Part 2"
1991	Ring of Scorpio	Bruno Torres	TV miniseries, 4 episodes
1991–93	All Together Now	Wayne Lovett	TV series, 101 episodes
1992	The Late Show	Rob after Plastic Surgery	TV series, season 1, episode 10
1995	Under Melbourne Tonight		TV series, episode airing 7 December 1995
2002	Stingers	Mick Dooley	TV series, season 5, episode 5: "A Little Crush"
2003	Legacy of the Silver Shadow	Mr. Vesuvius	TV series, season 1, episode 10: "Kings of the World"
1996	Melbourne International Comedy Festival	Self / comedian	TV series, 1 episode
1997	Live at Jongleurs	Self / comedian	TV series, 1 episode
2007	The World Stands Up	Self / comedian	TV series, 1 episode
2010	Man Up, Stand-Up	Self / comedian	TV series, 2 episodes

== Theatre ==
Year	Title	Role	Venue
1986	Dino Valentino and Sandra Lee in Club Italiano	Dino Valentino	Sydney Comedy Store (also director)
	Six O’Clock Rock		
	The Ghost of Jerry Bundler		
	In the Zone		
2013	Antony and Cleopatra	Various characters	King Street Theatre, Sydney

== Live stand-up (partial) ==
Year	Title	Role	Venue
1994	The Bald and the Beautiful	Comedian	Circus-Gurus for Melbourne International Comedy Festival
	Great Australian Comedy Show	Comedian	
2004	Show Us your Roots	Comedian	Crown Melbourne for Melbourne International Comedy Festival
2004	Show Us your Roots II	Comedian	Canberra Theatre
2004	Stars of Stand Up	Comedian	Thebarton Theatre, Adelaide
2016	Comedy in the Basement	Comedian	Arts Centre Gold Coast
2019	In Conversation with the Sopranos	Comedian / Opening Act	Southern Cross Club, Canberra, Enmore Theatre, Sydney, The Star Gold Coast, Crown Perth, Thebarton Theatre, Adelaide, Palais Theatre, Melbourne

== Video game ==
Year	Title	Role	Type
2004	Rome: Total War	Voice	Video game

== Discography ==
Year	Title
1997	Life After Chicki Babe
2012	Live - Australia's Most Wanted Comedy Rock N' Roller
