= Marshall Law (TV series) =

Australian TV series

- Genre: Legal drama
- Created by: Bevan Lee; Alison Nisselle; Rick Held
- Starring: Lisa McCune; Alison Whyte; William McInnes
- Composer: Jamie Saxe
- Country of origin: Australia
- Original language: English
- No. of seasons: 1
- No. of episodes: 17

Production
- Executive producer: John Holmes
- Producer: Alan Hardy
- Cinematography: Darrell Martin; Dick Tummel
- Editors: Anne Carter; Cliff Hayes; Philip Reid; Maryjeanne Watt
- Production company: Southern Star

Original release
- Network: Seven Network
- Release: 13 August – 26 November 2002

Marshall Law is an Australian television series, which aired on the Seven Network in 2002, starring Lisa McCune and Alison Whyte as lawyers and sisters.

== History ==
The show was originally conceived as a legal drama mixed with Ally McBeal-style romantic comedy, and was one of four new prime-time series in 2002, as the beginning of an attempt to revive the Australian television industry. The concept combined with the cast of industry heavyweights initially seemed like a package that could not fail.

Although ratings were good the first week, figures quickly slumped and the series, which first aired in August, finished airing in November, cancelled after only 17 episodes. Subsequently, repeat screenings were reedited to remove the Ally McBeal style CGI effects.

== Synopsis ==
Set in Melbourne, Marshall Law tells the story of two sisters – Ros and Verity Marshall (played by Lisa McCune, popular after her seven-year run on Blue Heelers; and Alison Whyte, well known for her role on Frontline) – working at the Magistrate's Court. Ros is a Junior Prosecutor who is more interested in partying, and is having to prove her worth at the bench; while the more-experienced and overachieving Verity is now working as a barrister.

Both sisters soon find themselves in for surprises. Ros realises just how out of her depth she may be, begging the help of legal aid solicitor Mikey O'Dea (Nick Farnell), and mentor Esther Hersch, QC (Anne Phelan of Something in the Air).

Meanwhile, Verity, working with her handsome but inept assistant Scott (Nathaniel Kiwi) faces her biggest challenge going up against one of the city's most eminent counsels, Dylan Boyd (William McInnes from SeaChange and Blue Heelers) – her ex-husband.

Verity and Ros, despite leading very different lifestyles, find themselves being forced to work together in this competitive world, particularly with the likes of Judge Don Foster (Greg Stone), Ros's boss Frank Dellabosca (Frank Gallacher), and the ambitious lawyer Prue Staley (Jane Hall). Verity McIntyre appeared as Julie Larson.

== Original pilot ==
The original Marshall Law pilot was a different affair. Titled Leather and Silk, with more emphasis on drama, Bevan Lee, co-creator with Alison Nisselle, described the pilot as being too serious. Executive Producer John Holmes acknowledged that emphasis on the workings of the law "... didn't hold a lot of excitement or interest, except for some die-hard people who love the law and are really interested in it".

Most major characters other than Lisa McCune's were cast differently, and many smaller roles were removed. Holmes explained :

"There were too many people in it. You didn't get a chance to get any traction with any of the characters. There were so many incidental characters, when you watched it, you weren't quite sure who to focus on. Now there's much more concentration on Verity, Ros and Dylan. The show is much more about them and their lives and how they deal with each other, with the background of the legal profession, rather than it being about the legal profession with these characters in it."

Industry A-Lister Kerry Armstrong originally played Verity, who was initially a magistrate rather than a barrister. In early 2002, Channel Seven announced that Armstrong would not be continuing with the series, claiming that she wasn't right for the part and "refused to play the role differently". Months later Armstrong agreed with the rumours that the producers thought she was too old for the part of McCune's sister. She would later join the cast of another of 2002's new shows, MDA, which fared much better.

Alyson Whyte had played Jane Hall's role of Prue Staley before moving over to take on the role of Verity.

Lani Tupu played Verity's ex-husband in the pilot instead of William McInnes. Deidre Rubenstein played the role that would become Anne Phelan's, and Bud Tingwell was the DPP before Frank Gallacher.

== Cast ==
- Lisa McCune as Ros Marshall
- Alison Whyte as Verity Marshall
- Nick Farnell as Mikey O'Dea
- Anne Phelan as Esther Hersch, QC
- Nathaniel Kiwi as Scott
- William McInnes as Dylan Boyd, QC
- Greg Stone as Judge Don Foster
- Frank Gallacher as Frank Dellabosca
- Jane Hall as Prue Stanley
- Verity McIntyre as Julie Larson
- Annie Jones as Sandra
- Benjamin McNair as Tarpey
- Briony Behets as Sonia
- Michele Fawdon as Judge Cath

== Ratings ==
Whilst the program came off the back of a strong lead in All Saints – it also faced tough competition in its Tuesday 9.30PM slot; Rove Live and another Australian drama, Nine's Stingers. It debuted well in its first week (airing Tuesday and Wednesday) but plummeted dramatically in week 2 and never recovered.

Week	Sydney	Melbourne	Brisbane	Adelaide	Perth	5-City	RANK
11 – 17 Aug	373,000	465,000	203,000	145,000	133,000	1,319,000	34
11 – 17 Aug	391,000	461,000	201,000	130,000	111,000	1,293,000	38
18 – 24 Aug	212,000	266,000	102,000	97,000	88,000	765,000	100
25 – 31 Aug	241,000	338,000	115,000	109,000	104,000	906,000	72
1 – 7 Sep	251,000	304,000	140,000	83,000	106,000	885,000	74
8 – 14 Sep	252,000	282,000	136,000	86,000	97,000	852,000	76
15 – 21 Sep	254,000	304,000	116,000	96,000	68,000	839,000	80
22 – 28 Sep	254,000	264,000	121,000	83,000	89,000	811,000	86
29 Sep – 5 Oct	204,000	243,000	101,000	84,000	98,000	730,000	88
6 – 12 Oct	238,000	237,000	122,000	94,000	103,000	794,000	84
27 Oct – 2 Nov	273,000	226,000	116,000	72,000	88,000	776,000	95
3 – 9 Nov	236,000	230,000	124,000	65,000	61,000	716,000	94
10 – 16 Nov	267,000	283,000	118,000	63,000	106,000	837,000	79
17 – 23 Nov	251,000	237,000	115,000	74,000	83,000	761,000	85
24 – 30 Nov	256,000	219,000	115,000	72,000	80,000	742,000	75

== See also ==
- List of Australian television series
