= Zone 39 =

- Directed by: John Tatoulis
- Written by: Deborah Parsons
- Based on: idea by John Tatoulis
- Produced by: Colin South; John Tatoulis
- Starring: Peter Phelps; William Zappa
- Cinematography: Peter Zakharov
- Edited by: Peter Burgess
- Music by: Burkhard Dallwitz
- Production company: Media World
- Distributed by: Roadshow (Australia); Beyond Films (international)
- Release dates: 4 May 1996 (Cannes Film Festival); 22 May 1997 (Australia)
- Running time: 95 minutes
- Country: Australia
- Language: English
- Budget: $4 million
- Box office: A$21,976 (Australia)

Zone 39 (The Zone) is a 1996 Australian science fiction psychological drama film directed by John Tatoulis. It stars Carolyn Bock, Peter Phelps and William Zappa, and runs for 93 minutes.

== Plot ==
The film tells the story of a future where the environment has been ravaged, leaving the world desolate. Two surviving factions, the New Territories and the Federal Republics, have been at war for 40 years. Finally, they have agreed to peace terms thanks to the efforts of the Central Union (CU). One of the security experts for the CU, Anne (Bock), decodes the encrypted messages of her boss, only to discover that one of the security zones has suffered a deadly contamination. Mysteriously, she dies shortly thereafter, leaving her soldier husband Leo (Phelps) devastated.

To recuperate, Leo is assigned to guard duty at the border outpost named Zone 39. The remainder of the film deals with Leo's struggle to cope with isolation and the death of his wife. She appears to him in hallucinations, perhaps brought on by the tranquillizers he has been taking.

== Cast ==
- Peter Phelps as Leo Megaw
- Carolyn Bock as Nova Anne
- William Zappa as Sharp
- Bradley Byquar as Boas
- David Tredinnick
- Jane Seletto as Dead Baby
- Jack Finsterer as Central Officer
- Alex Menglet as Tito

== Production ==
The film was based on an idea by John Tatoulis, which he first came up with eight years prior to filming. He said he was "concerned with questions of technology and politics in their current state, and how they’re going to affect society... I think people who do control communications have a lot of money and will start to influence the political system as we know it, if they don’t- already." Tatoulis added "The primary story is how an individual copes with his condition within such an environment and, espcially, how an individual copes with a certain sense of loss and aloneness." He hired Deb Parsons to write it into a script and obtained investment from Roadshow. The movie was the first in what was meant to be a three-picture deal with German company Foxton which made The Silver Brumby.

Director John Tatoulis later reflected:

In Zone 39, I was exploring a couple of things. One was the way in which a person deals with grief, the loss of a loved on. I truly believe that someone doesn't die until we stop thinking about that person. I think once we forget that person, once that person ceases to live in our memories, then that person is truly dead. Often it takes a long time for that person to truly die in people's hearts. I wanted to explore this theme in an environment that I think we're heading towards, one of being like a society that is particularly unfriendly to the individual and particularly isolates the individual and controls that individual.

The film was made with finance from the South Australian Film Corporation and the Australian Film Finance Corporation. It was shot over seven weeks from late October to early December 1995 around inner city Melbourne and in Crawfords’ Melbourne studios, and the salt pan around Woomera, South Australia for the desert scenes.

== Reception ==
Adrian Martin of The Age called the film "woeful... mind-boggling threadbare."

== Notes ==
- Helms, Michael (February 1997). "The sci fi zone". Cinema Papers. No. 114. pp. 24–25, 46.
