= My Brother Tom =

1986 telemovie directed by Pino Amenta

- Based on: My Brother Tom by James Aldridge
- Written by: Tony Morphett
- Directed by: Pino Amenta
- Starring: Tom Jennings; Catherine McClements; Keith Michell; Gordon Jackson
- Country of origin: Australia
- Original language: English
- No. of episodes: 2 x 2 hours

Production
- Producer: Rod Hardy
- Running time: 117 mins (video release)

Original release
- Network: Network Ten
- Release: 22 September – 23 September 1986

My Brother Tom is a 1986 Australian television miniseries about sectarianism in a small country town.

== Cast ==
- Tom Jennings as Tom Quayle
- Catherine McClements as Margaret 'Peggy' McGibbon
- Keith Michell as Edward Quayle
- Gordon Jackson as Lockie McGibbon
- Nadine Garner as Jean Quayle
- Maurie Fields as 'Muscles' Smith
- Christopher Mayer as Fin McColl
- Reg Gorman as M / O Driver
- Bud Tingwell as Justice Masters
- Ross Newton as Les Connor

== DVD release ==
It has been announced by Crawford Productions that this miniseries will be released on DVD in 2025.
