= Emily Wheaton =

British-Australian actress

- Occupation: Actress
- Years active: 2000–current
- Known for: Neighbours; Rush; The Slap

Emily Wheaton is a British-Australian actress who played Sharon 'Shazza' Cox in Australian soap opera Neighbours in 2005.

== Career ==
Wheaton appeared in the 2004 children's TV series Noah and Saskia as Renee and in the hit show Blue Heelers as Shayleen Burke. In 2005, she appeared in a recurring guest role as school girl Sharon 'Shazza' Cox, on long-running soap opera Neighbours.

In 2011, she had a recurring role as Amber Cushing in season 4 of Network 10’s police procedural series Rush. The same year, she played Jenna in the ABC eight-part miniseries The Slap, based on the best-selling novel by Christos Tsiolkas. In 2014 she voiced the character of Tina in animated adventure series Get Ace.

Her film credits include horror films 6 Plots (2012), and A Night of Horror Volume 1 (2015), and 2016 American fantasy action film Gods of Egypt opposite Chadwick Boseman and Nikolaj Coster-Waldau, playing a young maid servant.

Wheaton played Brigitta in the Melbourne 2000 stage season of The Sound of Music, alongside Lisa McCune and John Waters.

== Filmography ==
=== Television ===
Year	Title	Role	Notes
2004	Blue Heelers	Shaelyn Burke	2 episodes
2005	Noah and Saskia	Renee	7 episodes
2005	Neighbours	Sharon 'Shazza' Cox	7 episodes
2010	Lowdown	Waitress	1 episode
2011	The Slap	Jenna	Miniseries, 2 episodes
2011	Rush	Amber Cushing	9 episodes
2012	Dangerous Remedy	Bonnie McGregor	TV movie
2014	Get Ace	Tina DeVeer	Animated series, 25 episodes
2017	Triangle	Arina	

=== Film ===
Year	Title	Role	Notes
2003	L'envie	Emily	Short
2008	Buses and Trains	Sam	Short
2008	Summer Breaks	Vanessa	Short
2009	Bored Girls	Rihanna	Short
2010	The Accident	Amelia 18	Short
2011	Silent Night	Kim	Short
2011	Room for Two	Rebecca	Short
2012	Beat and Breath	Nelly	Short
2012	6 Plots	Tess Hart	
2013	Stung	Lena	Short
2014	Rabbit	Katya	Short
2014	Scission	Scarlet	Short
2015	A Night of Horror Volume 1	Scarlett	
2015	The Subjects	Jenna	
2015	Goodnight Sweetheart	Olive	Short
2016	Gods of Egypt	Second Young Maid Servant	
2018	Bloom	Jesse	Short
2020	Shove	Constable Holloway	Short

== Theatre ==
Year	Title	Role	Notes	Ref.
2000	The Sound of Music	Brigitta	Melbourne	
2011	Sleepyhead	Genevieve	MKA: Theatre of New Writing	
2013	The Shape of Things	Evelyn	No Vacancy Gallery, Melbourne	
