= Flat Chat (TV series) =

Australian television series

- Genre: Drama
- Written by: Alison Magney-Wall
- Directed by: Harry Cripps; Pino Amenta
- Country of origin: Australia
- Original language: English
- No. of series: 1
- No. of episodes: 13

Production
- Executive producers: David Martin; Kris Noble
- Producer: Richard Clendinnen
- Running time: 30 minutes
- Production companies: Fox Television Creative Australia; Nine Films and Television Pty Limited

Original release
- Network: Nine Network
- Release: 19 February – 15 May 2001

Flat Chat is an Australian sitcom that screened on the Nine Network in 2001.

Flat Chat tells the story of two very different women, a socialite and a bogan, whose lives change when their circumstances are reversed. Socialite Claire Jansen is forced to sell her mansion when her husband dies, leaving her flat broke. She moves into the stables when the house is bought by a rich but vulgar man and his new young wife who is unused to the ways of society. The two women form an unlikely alliance as they struggle to adjust to their new circumstances.

== Cast ==
=== Main / regular ===
- Jean Kittson as Claire Jansen
- Alexandra Davies as Julie Coyne
- Richard Healy as Barry Coyne
- Richard Wilson as Nick Jansen
- Marco Pio Venturini as Anthony Coreno
- Sarah Chadwick as Sarah
- Merridy Eastman as Katie
- Sally Strecker as Arnya Duchevnic

=== Guests ===
- Conrad Coleby (1 episode)
- Damon Herriman (1 episode)
- Dinah Shearing (1 episode)
- Don Hany as Detective Zane Malik (2 episodes)
- Henri Szeps as Cardinal Del Gardia (1 episode)
- Jason Clarke (1 episode)
- Jonathan Biggins as Duncan (1 episode)
- Julia Zemiro (1 episode)
- Moya O'Sullivan as Herself (1 episode)
- Murray Bartlett (1 episode)
- Nadine Garner as Herself (1 episode)
- Nicholas Bishop (1 episode)
- Tory Mussett (1 episode)

== Viewership ==
Season	Episodes	Originally aired		Network	Viewers (millions)	Rating	Drama Rank
Season	Episodes	Season premiere	Season finale	Network	Viewers (millions)	Rating	Drama Rank
1	13	19 February 2001	15 May 2001	Nine Network	1.166	8.9	#7

== See also ==
- List of Australian television series
