= Matt Day =

Australian actor

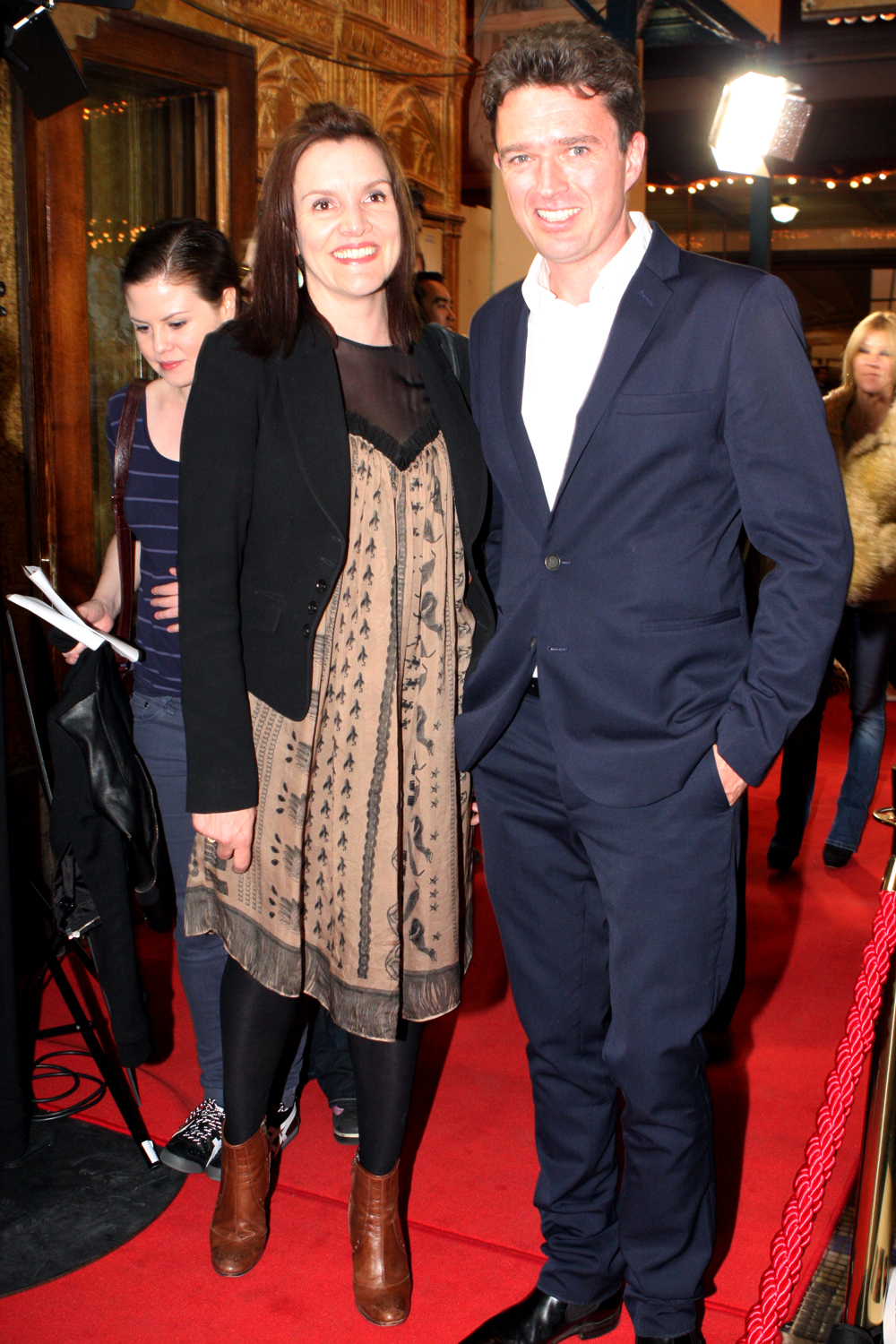
- The Sapphires movie premiere at State Theatre, Sydney, Australia, 2012
- Born: Matthew Day; 28 September 1971 (age 54); Melbourne, Victoria, Australia
- Education: Princes Hill Secondary College; St Martins Youth Arts Centre
- Occupations: Actor, filmmaker
- Known for: Muriel's Wedding; Kiss or Kill; Tangle
- Spouse: Kirsty Thomson
- Children: 2

Matthew Day (born 28 September 1971) is an Australian actor and filmmaker.

== Early life ==
Day was born in Melbourne, Victoria. When he was 11 years old, he went to live in the United States with his father, a newspaper correspondent, where he became interested in acting. On his return to Australia, he attended Princes Hill Secondary College, in Carlton North and joined St Martins Youth Arts Centre in South Yarra.

== Career ==
Day was spotted by an agent at the age of 14 and was soon cast in his first role in the ABC television series c/o The Bartons. At 17, he left his home in Carlton and relocated to Sydney for the role in the television series A Country Practice that was to be his first big break.

He has since gone on to establish a reputation as one of Australia's leading film, television and theatre actors, appearing in numerous Australian television series including Rake opposite Richard Roxburgh and Tangle alongside Ben Mendelsohn. He starred in the made for television films Hell Has Harbour Views (2005) and My Brother Jack (2001), and the two-part miniseries Paper Giants: The Birth of Cleo (2011).

His feature credits include Muriel's Wedding (1994), Love and Other Catastrophes (1996) alongside Radha Mitchell and Frances O'Connor, Kiss or Kill (1997) reuniting again with O'Connor. For his role in the latter, he received nominations for a Film Critics Circle Award and an AFI Award for Best Actor. He also starred in Woody Allen's Scoop (2006) alongside Hugh Jackman and Scarlett Johansson and My Year Without Sex (2009) and Touch (2014).

His international television credits include Shackleton with Kenneth Branagh, The Hound of the Baskervilles, The Commander, Spooks, Hotel Babylon, Secret Diary of a Call Girl and Bruce Beresford's And Starring Pancho Villa as Himself.

Short films as writer/director include Beat (2011 St Kilda Film Festival) My Everything (2003 Toronto Short Film Festival) and Wish (Turner Classic Shorts 2008 Winner - Special Mention, London Film Festival, Encounters Short Film Festival, Foyle Film Festival, Edinburgh International Film Festival, Stockholm Film Festival).

In 2017 he won the 25th Tropfest short film festival for his comic short film The Mother Situation, which he both directed and acted in.

In 2022 Day was announced as part of the cast for Channel 9 drama Human Error. In 2023 he was named for ABC musical drama In Our Blood. Day returned for the second season of Strife.

== Personal life ==
Day's parents divorced when he was young. His mother, an English teacher, took him around Europe for six months when he was 7 and his brother Michael was 9. He said later that "the whole experience went definitely some way to influencing my wanderlust".

Day met his wife, journalist Kirsty Thomson when he was living in Melbourne and she lived in Sydney. They initially conducted a long distance relationship, as Day was working on films and Thomson moved to Bathurst to do her master’s degree in journalism. Their first date was at a Nick Cave and the Bad Seeds concert. After meeting up regularly in Bowral, halfway between Sydney and Canberra, Day proposed. They were married in 2000, in a low-key wedding in Thomson's mother’s backyard in Balmain, and then moved to London together. They had their first child, a son, Jackson in the UK. They returned to Australia in 2007 and their second son Rufus was born two years later. The couple currently reside in Sydney.

== Filmography ==
=== Film ===
Year	Title	Role	Type
1994	Muriel's Wedding	Brice Nobes	Feature film
1996	Love and Other Catastrophes	Michael Douglas	Feature film
1996	Dating the Enemy	Rob	Feature film
1996	The Beast	Cosgrove	TV movie
1997	Kiss or Kill	Al Fletcher	Feature film
1997	The Two-Wheeled Time Machine	Henry Howard	Short film
1997	Doing Time for Patsy Cline	Ralph	Feature film
1998	The Sugar Factory	Harris	Feature film
2000	Muggers	Brad Forrest	Feature film
2000	The Love of Lionel's Life (aka Open Life)	Lionel	TV movie
2001	My Brother Jack	David Meredith	TV movie
2001	The Green-Eyed Monster	Liam McGuire	TV movie
2002	The Hound of the Baskervilles	Sir Henry Baskerville	TV movie
2003	And Starring Pancho Villa as Himself	John Reed	TV movie
2005	Hell Has Harbour Views	Hugh Walker	TV movie
2006	Scoop	Jerry Burke	Feature film
2008	The Informant	Cameron Clifford	TV movie
2009	My Year Without Sex	Ross	Feature film
2013	The Outlaw Michael Howe	Magistrate Robert Knopwood	TV movie
2014	Touch	John	Feature film
2017	Dance Academy: The Movie	Barrister Jeff Menzies	TV movie
2017	Sweet Country	Judge Taylor	Feature film
2017	The Mother Situation		Short film (also director)
2018	Reaching Distance	Martin	
2024	Runt	Fergus Fink	

=== Television ===
Year	Title	Role	Type
1988	c/o The Bartons	Paul Barton	TV series
1988	House Rules		
1989–1993	A Country Practice	Julian 'Luke' Ross	TV series
1994	The Bob Morrison Show	Jake Duffy	TV series
1995	Snowy River: The McGregor Saga	Pete Reilly	TV series
1996	Water Rats	Matthews	TV series
2000	Farscape	Councilor Tyno	TV series
2002	Shackleton	Frank Hurley	Miniseries
2003	Wild Down Under	Narrator	TV series
2006	Hotel Babylon	Richard	TV series
2006	Spooks	Neil Sternin	TV series
2007	The Commander	Eric Thornton	Miniseries
2009–2010	Tangle	Gabriel Lucas	TV series
2010	Underbelly: The Golden Mile	Sid Hillier	TV series
2010–2018	Rake	David Potter	TV series
2011	Paper Giants: The Birth of Cleo	Daniel Ritchie	Miniseries
2011	Secret Diary of a Call Girl	Receptionist	TV series
2012	Miss Fisher's Murder Mysteries	Henry Rhodes	TV series "King Memses' Curse" (S1:E13)
2014–2018	Black Comedy	Various roles	TV series 13 episodes
2017	Love Child	Father Ross	TV series
2017	Wolf Creek	Brian	TV series
2019	Les Norton	Gecko	TV series
2019	Get Krack!n	Brendan O'Hara	TV series
2021	Harrow	Dr Bramson	TV series, 2 episodes
2021	The Unusual Suspects	Garth	Miniseries
2023	In Our Blood	Jeremy Wilding	4 episodes
2023–25	Strife	Jon Jones	16 episodes
2024	Human Error	Luke O'Rourke	6 episodes

== Theatre ==
Year	Title	Role	Type
1986	Zigger Zagger		St Martins Youth Arts Centre, Melbourne
1988	Black Rabbit	Stanley	Studio Theatre, Melbourne with Playbox Theatre Company
1992	Man of the Moment		Seymour Centre, Sydney, with Ensemble Theatre
1992	Six Degrees of Separation		Sydney Opera House with STC
1992	The Game of Love and Chance		New England Theatre Company
1998	Fred		Wharf Theatre, Sydney, with STC
2008	Scarlett O'Hara at the Crimson Parrot	Alan	Playhouse, Melbourne with MTC
2009	The Wonderful World of Dissocia	'Insecurity' guard	Wharf Theatre, Sydney, with STC / MTC
2015–2016, 2018	North by Northwest	Roger O Thornhill	Playhouse, Melbourne, State Theatre, Melbourne, Lyric Theatre, Brisbane, Festival Theatre, Adelaide with MTC
2017	A Strategic Plan	Simon	Stables Theatre, Sydney with Griffin Theatre Company
2020	The Deep Blue Sea	Sir William Collyer	STC
2022	Blithe Spirit	Charles Condomine	Sydney Opera House with STC
2023	Sunday	John Reed	Southbank Theatre, Melbourne, with MTC

== Writer/director ==
Year	Title	Type
2011	Beat	Short film
2003	My Everything	Short film
2008	Wish	Short film
2017	The Mother Situation	Short film (also actor)

== Awards and nominations ==
Year	Nominated work	Award	Category	Result
1997	Kiss or Kill	Film Critics Circle of Australia	Best Actor in a Leading Role	Nominated
1997	Kiss or Kill	AFI Awards	Best Actor in a Leading Role	Nominated
2008	Wish	Turner Classic Shorts	2008 Winner	Special Mention
2017	The Mother Situation	25th Tropfest Short Film Festival	2017 Winner	Won
