= Gross Misconduct (film) =

1993 film

- Region 4 DVD cover
- Directed by: George T. Miller
- Written by: Gerard Maguire; Lance Peters
- Based on: the play by Lance Peters
- Starring: Jimmy Smits; Naomi Watts
- Cinematography: David Connell
- Edited by: Henry Dangar
- Music by: Bruce Rowland
- Distributed by: Becker Entertainment; Magna Pacific
- Release date: 29 July 1993
- Running time: 89 minutes
- Country: Australia
- Language: English
- Budget: over A$4 million
- Box office: A$489,598 (Australia)

Gross Misconduct is a 1993 Australian thriller film directed by George T. Miller. It stars Jimmy Smits and Naomi Watts. It was nominated for an award by the Australian Film Institute in 1993. The film has been described as an Australian version of Fatal Attraction.

== Plot ==
At an all-girls academy in Australia, a married philosophy professor, Justin Thorne, attracts a fervent admirer in one of his students, Jennifer Carter.

Daughter of the school's headmaster, Jennifer is driven by a passion for the professor, practically throwing herself at him. Thorne resists repeatedly, but finally yields to temptation. Jennifer, feeling rejected later, accuses the professor of a sexual assault. A journal she has been keeping, fantasizing about a lover, makes it appear that she and the professor have been carrying on a long affair, placing Thorne's reputation and future in grave danger.

After Thorne is found guilty in a jury trial it emerges that Jennifer's father has been sexually abusing her over some considerable time, and pesters her once again. This time she snaps, and stabs him in the face with a kitchen implement. The last scene shows Thorne emerging from jail, freed.

== Cast ==
- Jimmy Smits as Justin Thorne
- Naomi Watts as Jennifer Carter
- Sarah Chadwick as Laura Thorne
- Adrian Wright as Kenneth Carter
- Tara Judah as Nancy Thorne
- Brendon Suhr as Terry MacKnight
- Ross Williams as David Guilde
- Goran Stamenkovic as Oliver Thorne
- Alan Fletcher as Henry Landers
- Beverley Dunn as Judge Barlow
- Nicholas Bell as Detective Matthews
- Fiona Corke as Detective Coote
- Jack Finsterer as Policeman

== Assault with a Deadly Weapon ==
The film was based on the play Assault With a Deadly Weapon which was written in 1969 by Lance Peters. It had been suggested by a 1955 scandal in Hobart, where university professor Sydney Orr had been sacked from his job on grounds of gross misconduct.

In November 1969 it was announced Harry M. Miller bought the rights to the play. It debuted in September 1971 in a production starring Pamela Stephenson. The Sydney Morning Herald said "in this play there are no real people."

Gross Moral Turpitude, Cassandra Pybus' book on the Orr case which also emerged in 1993, gives a very different reading on Orr from Peters' and this film's. She writes that "in the Orr case... it was almost universally accepted... that an academic who seduced a student should be dismissed. He did. He was."

== Production ==
The movie was the first film to be produced by PRO Films in Australia, a subsidiary of R.A. Becker & Co. It was shot at various locations around Melbourne, including The University of Melbourne, the Melbourne Magistrates Court and Queen Victoria Market.

== Box office ==
Gross Misconduct grossed $489,598 at the box office in Australia.

== See also ==
- Cinema of Australia
