= Legacy of the Silver Shadow =

2002 Australian children's television series

- Genre: Adventure
- Created by: Chris Anastassiades and Ray Boseley
- Starring: Aljin Abella; Sage Butler; Hannah Greenwood; Alex Hopkins; Eloise Mignon; Tayler Kane; Ronald Faulk
- Composer: Frank Strangio
- Country of origin: Australia
- Original language: English
- No. of seasons: 1
- No. of episodes: 13

Production
- Executive producer: Patricia Edgar
- Producers: Patricia Edgar; Bernadette O'Mahon; Jenni Tosi
- Cinematography: Craig Barden
- Editor: Peter Carrodus
- Running time: 25
- Production companies: The Australian Children's Television Foundation; Darestar; Ponderosa Productions

Original release
- Network: Network 10
- Release: 8 November 2002

Legacy of the Silver Shadow is an Australian children's television series that first aired on the Ten Network in 2002. The thirteen-part series follows the story of four children who help a dead superhero.

Legacy of the Silver Shadow was created by Chris Anastassiades and Ray Boseley. It was produced by Patricia Edgar and directed by Boseley, Pino Amenta, Stephen Johnson and Julian McSwiney. It is written by Boseley, Anastassiades, Philip Dalkin, Robert Greenberg, Susan Macgillicuddy, David Devries, Stephen Bates, Christine Madafferi, and Cameron Clarke.

== Cast ==
- Aljin Abella as Campbell
- Sage Butler as Gretel
- Hannah Greenwood as Alex
- Alex Hopkins as Josh
- Eloise Mignon as Fiona
- Tayler Kane as Silver Shadow
- Ronald Faulk as The Crab
- Brendan Carroll as Feral
- Stephanie McIntosh as Samantha
- Melanie Dunn as Trudy
- Talia Zucker as Dina
- Reg Gorman as Checkers
- Bruno Lucia as Mr Vesuvius
- Bud Tingwell as Billings
- Andrew Blackman as Atomic Clock

== See also ==
- List of Australian television series
