= Tanya and Floyd =

- Written by: Harry Cripps
- Directed by: Brendan Maher
- Starring: Jack Finsterer; Sarah Chadwick
- Country of origin: Australia
- Original language: English

Production
- Cinematography: Geoffrey Wharton
- Editor: Marcus D'Arcy
- Running time: 25 minutes

Original release
- Network: Nine Network
- Release: 2002

Tanya and Floyd is an Australian television film that aired on the Nine Network in 2002. Intended as a pilot for a series, the film started production in late 2000 but did not air until February 2002, scheduled during a break in a Cricket test match.

== Synopsis ==
Love blossoms after gardener Floyd (27) breaks into the bedroom of lawyer Tanya (39).

== Cast ==
- Jack Finsterer as Floyd
- Sarah Chadwick as Tanya
- Sophie Lee as Mickey Falstaff
- John Howard as Teddy

== Reception ==
David James of the Herald Sun wrote "Just when you thought it could never happen, someone comes up with an Aussie comedy that's worse than Pizza -- and by a long way." In the Age Brian Courtis said "Not even the most dismal shows of the '80s, those terrible sitcoms rattled together so that English TV comics or writers could be served and play doctors Down Under, left you feeling as depressed as a show like this." He mused "you wonder whether any of the performers were told that this was, in fact, a comedy." The Sydney Morning Herald's Stuart O'Connor noted "Tanya and Floyd is a shocker on all counts badly written, woefully acted and nary a laugh to be had. It co-stars John Howard and Sophie Lee, who both should have known better."
