= Glad Rags (TV series) =

Australian television series

- Genre: TV series
- Written by: Trevor Todd
- Starring: Sarah Chadwick; Brooke Adams
- Country of origin: Australia
- Original language: English
- No. of episodes: 13

Production
- Running time: 30 mins
- Production company: Nomad

Original release
- Release: 3 July – 21 July 1995

Glad Rags is an Australian children's television series which screened on the Nine Network in 1995.

== Cast ==
- Sarah Chadwick as Patricia 'Trish' Forbes
- Brooke Anderson as Lizzie Forbes
- Grant Piro as Warren Hamm
- Jerome Ehlers as Graeme Marsden
