= House Rules (1988 TV series) =

1988 Australian TV series

- Created by: Barbara Bishop
- Directed by: Gary Conway; Peter Dodds; Helen Gaynor; Paul Moloney; Amanda Smith; Karl Steinberg
- Starring: Jacki Weaver; Gil Tucker; Charles 'Bud' Tingwell
- Country of origin: Australia
- Original language: English
- No. of seasons: 1
- No. of episodes: 24

Production
- Producer: Alan Hardy
- Running time: 50 minutes

Original release
- Network: ABC
- Release: 10 July – 18 December 1988

House Rules is an Australian television series that aired on ABC in 1988. It was scheduled for twenty four 50 minute episodes.

== Synopsis ==
A house wife accidentally becomes a member of parliament after the sitting member fails to register for the election. The shows follows a blended Buckley family, Julie, housewife come parliamentarian, Max, a builder, and three children, Sophie, Chris and Jack.

== Cast ==
- Jacki Weaver as Julie Buckley
- Gil Tucker as Max Buckley
- Matt Day as Chris
- Nadine Garner as Sophie
- Jacob Kino as Jack
- Charles 'Bud' Tingwell as Clarrie O'Donnell
- Louise Siversen as Elsa Nixon

== Production ==
The series was filmed in Melbourne with around two episodes shot every week.
