= Journey to the Center of the Earth (miniseries) =

1999 miniseries

- DVD cover
- Genre: Science fiction
- Based on: A Journey to the Center of the Earth by Jules Verne
- Written by: Thomas Baum
- Directed by: George Miller
- Starring: Treat Williams; Jeremy London; Bryan Brown
- Theme music composer: Bruce Rowland
- Country of origin: United States
- Original language: English
- No. of episodes: 2

Production
- Executive producer: Kris Noble
- Producers: Connie Collins; George Miller
- Cinematography: Bruce Phillips
- Editor: Harry Hitner
- Running time: 178 minutes
- Production company: Hallmark Entertainment

Original release
- Network: USA Network
- Release: September 14 – September 15, 1999

Journey to the Center of the Earth is a 1999 American science fiction miniseries produced by Hallmark Entertainment. It stars Treat Williams, Jeremy London, and Bryan Brown. It is based on Jules Verne's classic 1864 novel Journey to the Center of the Earth.

== Plot ==
Theodore Lytton is an avid geologist and paleontologist who is aided by his nephew Jonas Lytton, a Harvard graduate. Theodore seeks for ways to finance his undertakings, including illegal street fighting. After one of his lectures, Theodore is approached by Alice Hastings who finances the Lyttons' journey into the center of Earth on a quest to find her lost husband Casper Hastings. Casper had 7 years prior gone to seek a fortune of gold rumored to exist far below the Earth's surface. The Lyttons meet McNiff, a gun for hire, in New Zealand. The Lyttons, McNiff, and Alice Hastings find their way miles underneath the Earth and reach an underground sea lit by a gaseous anomaly that provides light and life to this underground world.

After traveling across the sea, the travelers encounter dinosaurs, two human settlements, and a humanoid reptilian species, the Solaroids, that may have evolved from dinosaurs. Alice is captured by the Solaroids. The group find Casper Hastings, who years prior discovered the humans, taught them English, and then endorsed a polygamist culture inducing a split in the human settlement. Casper Hastings is known as the 'School Master' in this newer polygamist settlement, while the more established human settlement endorses monogamy. There is friction between the human settlements and also with the Solaroids. Casper, joined by the Lyttons, free Alice from a Solaroid prison cell and return to Casper's settlement. There he reveals his plan to leave for the surface, with his wife and the Lyttons. McNiff decides to remain behind with the natives. Casper also reveals a mysterious plant with nearly magical healing remedies and intends to market it on the surface.

The group of travelers, now joined by Ralna, a native tribeswoman for whom Jonas develops strong feelings, begin their journey to the surface. Casper is killed by the Solaroids before reaching the sea. The 4 travelers sail across the sea and begin to head back the way they came to the surface. Ralna, sensing danger, leaves in panic and is separated from Jonas. The Lyttons and Alice reach the surface through an underground vortex that feeds water to a lake on the surface. It is discovered the magical plant dies within a few hours of being on the surface. Weeks later, Theodore and Alice are engaged to wed while Jonas, who was previously engaged, leaves his fiancée to find Ralna in the underground world.

== Cast ==
- Treat Williams as Theodore Lytton
- Jeremy London as Jonas Lytton
- Tushka Bergen as Alice Hastings
- Hugh Keays-Byrne as McNiff
- Bryan Brown as Casper Hastings
- Tessa Wells as Helen
- Petra Yared as Ralna
- Sarah Chadwick as Mashowna
- Robert Rabiah as Unsavoury Man

== Reception ==
Journey to the Center of the Earth received mostly negative reviews from critics. David Kronke, writing in the Los Angeles Daily News, called the miniseries "thoroughly cheesy" and "flaccid." The Seattle Post-Intelligencer opined that the effects work "[couldn't] overcome a barrage of ponderous dialogue and simply bland acting."

== Featured species ==
- "Raptorsaur" (fictional) shown with a Ceratosaurus horn and Stegosaurus plates and spiked tail, thought to be strict vegetarian with occasional lapses and thought to be in Late Triassic and Early Jurassic
- Devonian Fish, identified as belonging to the Aspidocephali
- Humanoid dinosaurs (fictional)
- Pterosaurs (a cross between the Pteranodon and the Rhamphorhynchus)
- Eurypterida
