= All Together Now (1991 Australian TV series) =

Australian situation comedy (1991-1993)

- Stars (left to right) Steven Jacobs, Jane Hall, Jon English, Rebecca Gibney, Garry Who, Bruno Lucia
- Genre: Sitcom
- Created by: Pino Amenta; Philip Dalkin; John Powditch
- Directed by: Pino Amenta; Kendal Flannagan; Andrew Friedman
- Starring: Jon English; Rebecca Gibney; Steven Jacobs; Jane Hall; Garry Who; Bruno Lucia; Kerry Armstrong
- Theme music composer: Jon English
- Country of origin: Australia
- Original language: English
- No. of seasons: 4
- No. of episodes: 101

Production
- Executive producer: Kris Noble
- Producer: Alan Hardy
- Production locations: Melbourne, Victoria
- Editor: Philip Reid
- Running time: 25 minutes

Original release
- Network: Nine Network
- Release: 22 January 1991 – 14 September 1993

All Together Now is an Australian sitcom that was broadcast on Nine Network between 1991 and 1993. The premise involved an ageing rocker, played by Jon English trying to maintain his music career while living with his son and daughter. For an undetermined number of initial episodes filmed prior to public broadcast, the show title was "Rhythm and Blues" and had a different theme song.

== Cast ==
=== Main ===
- Jon English as Bobby Rivers
- Rebecca Gibney as Tracy Lawson (Eps 1–86)
- Steven Jacobs as Thomas Sumner
- Jane Hall as Anna Sumner
- Garry Who as Doug Stevens (Eps 1–76)
- Bruno Lucia as Wayne Lovett
- Kerry Armstrong as Beth Sumner (Eps 85–101)

=== Recurring ===
- Radha Mitchell as Jodie (6 episodes)

=== Guests ===
- Christopher Truswell as Rhys (1 episode)
- Georgie Parker as Brenda Beanley (1 episode)
- Gus Mercurio as Freddy Vale (1 episode)
- Ian McFadyen as Simon Carpenter (1 episode)
- Khym Lam as Rita (1 episode)
- Kim Gyngell as Louie Little (1 episode)
- Lochie Daddo as Marcus McConaughey (1 episode)
- Mary-Anne Fahey as Rivka Carpenter (1 episode)
- Mike Bishop as Mr Reid (1 episode)
- Nadine Garner as Karen Moyer (1 episode)
- Tracy Mann as Jackie Hammond (1 episode)

== Awards ==
At the 1992 Logie Awards, the show and its actors were nominated for four awards:

- The show (Light Entertainment/Comedy Program)
- Rebecca Gibney (Most Popular Actress, and Most Popular Light Entertainment/Comedy Female Performer)
- Jon English (Most Popular Light Entertainment/Comedy Male Performer)

The show was also nominated at the 1993 Logie Awards, for Most Popular Comedy Program, as was Jon English for Most Popular Comedy Personality.

== Home media ==
Series 2 is still currently available on DVD and The Complete Series is available on Umbrella Streaming Service and Amazon Prime Video.

Title	Format	Ep #	Discs	Region 4 (Australia)	Special features	Distributors
All Together Now (Season 01)	DVD	21	4	6 November 2013	Goof Reel	Umbrella Entertainment
All Together Now (Season 02)	DVD	23	4	5 March 2014	Goof Reel	Umbrella Entertainment
All Together Now (Season 03)	DVD	26	4	6 July 2016	N/A	Umbrella Entertainment
All Together Now (Season 04)	DVD	31	5	6 July 2016	N/A	Umbrella Entertainment
All Together Now (Complete Series)	DVD	101	17	4 July 2018	N/A	Umbrella Entertainment

== See also ==
- List of Nine Network programs
- List of Australian television series
