= Gil Tucker =

Australian actor

- Born: 23 August 1947 (age 79)
- Occupation: Television actor

Gil Tucker (born 23 August 1947) is an Australian television actor, most remembered for his role as Constable Roy Baker in the television crime drama Cop Shop.

Tucker co-starred as Max Buckley in 1988's House Rules. He portrayed Martin Chester in soap opera Neighbours in 1999. In 2007 to 2009 he played the part of the coroner on City Homicide.

Since 1988, Tucker has run a herb and fruit supply business to the hospitality trade around Melbourne.

In 2020 Tucker is starring in the play The Curtain in Melbourne.
