= Pino Amenta =

Australian director

Pino Amenta is an Australian director, known for his work in television. After beginning his career with Crawford Productions, Amenta has directed episodes of numerous television series and three feature films. He also co-created the comedy series All Together Now.

== Career ==
Amenta began his career at Crawford Productions when he was 16 years old. He was initially in charge of sound, but soon began directing. He worked on the 1970's series Chopper Squad, Young Ramsay and The Sullivans. Throughout the 1980s, he directed episodes of Taurus Rising, All The Rivers Run, The Flying Doctors miniseries, Anzacs, My Brother Tom, Sword of Honour, Nancy Wake, All the Way, and the television film Barracuda. In 1988, he directed his first feature film Boulevard of Broken Dreams, which was written and produced by Frank Howson. It was filmed in Los Angeles and Melbourne. Amenta had been offered a number of film scripts before, but turned them down in order to do "good TV".

Amenta then directed the 1990 film Heaven Tonight. Amenta co-created the 1991 comedy series All Together Now, which he also directed. He also worked on Acropolis Now, The Man from Snowy River, Blue Heelers, The Bob Morrison Show, Us and Them, Good Guys, Bad Guys, Round the Twist. In the 2000s, he directed episodes of Legacy of the Silver Shadow, Noah and Saskia, and Last Man Standing.

== Personal life ==
Amenta is the father of actress Jade Amenta. He initially wanted his daughter to complete her education and take up acting when she was older, before she was cast as Melissa Jarrett in Neighbours.

== Selected credits ==
=== Film ===
Title	Year	Credited as	Notes
Title	Year	Director	Notes
Boulevard of Broken Dreams	1988	Yes	
Heaven Tonight	1990	Yes	
What the Moon Saw	1990	Yes	

=== Television ===
The numbers in directing credits refer to the number of episodes.

Year	Title	Credited as		Network	Notes
Year	Title	Director	Writer	Network	Notes
1976	The Sullivans	Yes	No	Nine Network	unknown episodes
1978	Chopper Squad	Yes (1)	No	Network 10	
1980	Young Ramsay	Yes (1)	No	Seven Network	
1980	Cop Shop	Yes (3)	No	Seven Network	
1981	Bellamy	Yes (2)	No	Network 10	
1982	Taurus Rising	Yes	No	Nine Network	unknown episodes
1983	All the Rivers Run	Yes (4)	No	Seven Network	miniseries
1985	The Flying Doctors	Yes (3)	No	Nine Network	miniseries
1985	Anzacs	Yes (5)	No	Nine Network	miniseries
1986	My Brother Tom	Yes (2)	No	Nine Network	miniseries
1986	Sword of Honour	Yes (2)	No	Seven Network	miniseries
1987	Sons and Daughters	Yes (8)	No	Seven Network	
1987	Nancy Wake	Yes (2)	No	Seven Network	miniseries
1988	Barracuda	Yes	No	Seven Network	Television film
1989–1991	Acropolis Now	Yes (20)	Yes (1)	Seven Network	
1989–1990	The Flying Doctors	Yes (8)	No	Nine Network	
1991–1993	All Together Now	Yes (92)	Yes (1)	Nine Network	
1994	The Bob Morrison Show	Yes	No	Nine Network	unknown episodes
1995	Us and Them	Yes	No	Nine Network	unknown episodes
1995–1996	The Man from Snowy River	Yes (6)	No	unknown episodes	
1997	Good Guys, Bad Guys	Yes (4)	No	Nine Network	
1998–1999	Blue Heelers	Yes (2)	No	Seven Network	
1999–2001	Crash Zone	Yes (4)	Yes (1)	Seven Network	
1999	Farscape	Yes (2)	No	Nine Network	
1999	Chuck Finn	Yes (10)	No	Seven Network	
2000	Round the Twist	Yes (4)	No	ABC1	
2000	Beastmaster	Yes (8)	No		
2001	Flat Chat	Yes (13)	No	Nine Network	
2001	The Lost World	Yes (3)	No		
2001	Crash Palace	Yes	No		unknown episodes
2002	Guinevere Jones	Yes (2)	No	Network 10	
2002	Marshall Law	Yes (1)	No	Seven Network	
2003	Legacy of the Silver Shadow	Yes (1)	No	Network 10	
2003	Always Greener	Yes (2)	No	Seven Network	
2004	Noah and Saskia	Yes (13)	No	ABC	
2004	Silversun	Yes (12)	No	Seven Network	
2005	Last Man Standing	Yes (2)	No	Seven Network	
2005	Holly's Heroes	Yes (4)	No	Nine Network	
2005–2009	All Saints	Yes (9)	No	Seven Network	
2006–2007	Mortified	Yes (11)	No	Nine Network	
2007–2010	City Homicide	Yes (10)	No	Seven Network	
2008–2013	Packed to the Rafters	Yes (26)	No	Seven Network	
2011–2015	Winners & Losers	Yes (16)	No	Seven Network	
2012	Conspiracy 365	Yes (4)	No	ABC3	
2014–2015	The Doctor Blake Mysteries	Yes (4)	Yes (1)	ABC	
2014	Worst Year of My Life Again	Yes (7)	No	ABC3	
2014–2021	Wentworth	Yes (2)	No	SoHo	series producer (2016–21); 65 episodes)
2015	800 Words	Yes (4)	No	Seven Network	
2019	Five Bedrooms	No	No	Network 10	series producer
2022	Darby and Joan (TV series)	No	No	Acorn	Director
2021–2023	Home and Away	Yes (20)	No	Seven Network	Director
