= High Flyers (Australian TV series) =

- Created by: David Ogilvy
- Country of origin: Australia
- Original language: English
- No. of seasons: 2
- No. of episodes: 52

Production
- Running time: 25 minutes
- Production company: Southern Star Entertainment

Original release
- Release: 1999 – 2000

High Flyers is an Australian children's television series which first screened on the Seven Network in 1999. The series ran for two seasons and was aimed at children and teenagers. It was produced by Southern Star Entertainment.

== Premise ==
High Flyers follows the adventures and triumphs of a group of children as they discover and develop their talents in an extraordinary children's circus. Luke and Phoebe move to the country but the first impressions of their new home are not encouraging until they discover the town has its own circus, managed by Caz.

== Cast ==
=== Main ===
- Clayton Watson as Luke
- Emily Browning as Phoebe
- Jane Hall as Caz
- Robert Grubb as Mr. Bull
- Anthony Hammer
- Jade Butler as Julianna 'Jules' Price
- Brandon Burns as Bert

=== Supporting ===
- Alex Menglet as Alexei
- Algin Abella as Kyet Nguyen
- Andrew Clarke as Sergeant Saunders
- Bartholomew Nash as Trevor
- Bonnie Piesse as Donna
- Carmelina Di Guglielmo as Rosa
- Christopher Brown as Steve
- Denise Briskin as Taya
- Hannah Greenwood as Dallas
- Katy Brinson as Sarah
- Louise Siversen as Nola
- Nikolai Nikolaeff as Nick
- Rhona Rees as Charlie
- Scott Mackenzie as Simmo
- Serge De Nardo as Pablo
- Talia Krape as Carmen Price
- Tania Lacy as Robyn Kettrick
- Zane Elvis De Courcy as Mitchell 'Mitch' Price
