= Us and Them (Australian TV series) =

- No. of seasons: 1
- No. of episodes: 13

Original release
- Network: Nine Network
- Release: 1995

Us and Them is an Australian situation comedy series which first screened on the Nine Network in 1995. It follows the story of Russell, Nick, Bernadette, and Donna as they work through their differences. The series was produced by Philip Dalkin and Kris Noble, directed by Pino Amenta, David Cameron, Philip Dalkin and written by Elizabeth Coleman, Philip Dalkin and Anthony Morris.

== Cast ==
- Rhys Muldoon as Nick
- Doris Younane as Bernadette "Bernie"
- Brian Meegan as Russell
- Kylle Hogart as Donna
