= List of Tropfest finalists =

Tropfest is the world's largest short film festival. The following is an incomplete list of finalists.

== 1993 ==
No 1993 TSI

== 1994 ==
TSI: Muffin

== 1995 ==
TSI: Coffee bean

Title	Director	Awards Won	Ref
Swinger	Gregor Jordan	First	
Pizza Man	Paul Fenech	Third	

== 1996 ==
TSI: Teaspoon

== 1997 ==
TSI: Pickle

Title	Director	Awards Won	Ref
Rust Bucket		Second Best Actor: Rowan Woods	

== 1998 ==
TSI: Kiss

Title	Director	Awards Won	Ref
		Best Female Actor: Julia Zemiro	

== 1999 ==
TSI: Chopsticks

== 2000 ==
TSI: Bug

Title	Director	Awards Won	Ref
Old Man	Robin Feiner, Jesse Gibson	Best Actor: Basil Clarke	
Noise			
How far can you wear your underpants from the beach?			

== 2001 ==
TSI: Horn

Title	Director	Awards Won	Ref
A Matter of Life	Jennifer Perrott		
Tickler	Clayton Jacobson	Tropicana Prize	
Muffled Love	Rene Hernandez		
The Lighter	Patrick Hughes		
Just Not Cricket	Matt Wheeldon		
The Art of Farewell	David Napier		
Beep	Eddie Edwards		
Like It Is	Chris Begley, Tony D'Aquino		
Home Straight	Mickey Power		
Chopper	Bernard Derriman		
A Day at the Zoo	Matthew Gidney		
Playin’ Hard to Get	Tim Bullock		
Boambee return	Liz Crosby		
Burn	Michael Dunning		
The Cutting Room Floor	Steve Baker		
Ride On	Nick Wyles		

== 2002 ==
TSI: Match

Title	Director	Awards Won	Ref
		Best Male Actor: Sam Worthington	
Lamb	Emma Freeman	First	
Wilfred		Best Comedy Best Actor – Male	

== 2003 ==
TSI: Rock

== 2004 ==
TSI: Hook

== 2005 ==
TSI: Umbrella

Title	Director	Awards Won	Ref
Bomb	Alister Grierson	People's Choice Award	
Rattus Pistofficus	Josh Reed		
In Your Dreams	Greg Williams		
Benny Unseen Hero	Darren Arbib, Steven Hirst		
Fingerprints	Cathrine McVeigh		
Lucky	Nash Edgerton	Second	
Garbage Man	Henry Naylor		
Coma	Stuart Charles		
This Film is Yet To Be Classified	Jayce White		
Too Sunny, Too Cold	Tania Yuki		
Too Far	Matthew Peek		
The Razor's Edge	Gabriel Dowrick		
A Family Legacy	Rory Williamson		
Money	James Wilson		
Chiuso	Hugh Rutherford		
Australian Summer	Luke Eve	First	

== 2006 ==
TSI: Bubble

Title	Director	Awards Won	Ref
Carmichael and Shane	Rob Carlton, Alex Weinress	First	
September	Peter Carstairs		
Applause	Michael Noonan	Best Screenplay	

== 2007 ==
TSI: Sneeze

Title	Director	Awards Won	Ref
An Imaginary Life	Steve Baker	First	
Road Rage	Mark Bellamy	Second	
The Von	John Mavety	Third Young Talent Award: Jacob Bicknell	
Between The Flags	Jayce White	Best Comedy Best Actor: Matuse	
Mere Oblivion	Burleigh Smith	Best Actress: Elizabeth Calacob	
Real Thing	Rupert Glasson	Women in Film Award: Rani Chaleyer Best Original Score	
Yellow	William Allert	Best Screenplay	
Bad Yoghurt	Shaun Beagley	Tropicana Award	
Fore!	Duane Fogwell	Best Editing	
The Grey Cloud	Matt Peek	Best Cinematography	
A-Z	Zenon Kohler		
Being Boston	Justin Drape		
Counter	Michael Noonan		
Pig Latin	Nathaniel Kiwi		
Still	Jayne Montague		
The Story of Ned	Simon Weaving		

== 2008 ==
TSI: The number 8

Title	Director	Awards Won	Ref
Ascension	David Easteal		
Beggars Belief	Colin Cairnes		
Blues For The Soul	Dean Preston		
The Code	Murray Fahey	Sony Foundation Young Talent Award	
Dusk	William Allert		
Fault	Daniel Miller	Best Animation Award	
Glass	Jayne Monague	Balance Water Women in Film Award Best Cinematography	
Great White Hunters	Gary Doust	Third Best Comedy	
Looped	Sarah Crowest	Best Screenplay	
Made In Australia	Monte Macpherson		
Marry Me	Michelle Lehman	First Best Female Actor: Jahla Bryant	
Mouse Race!	Paul Williams		
Scab	Koichi Iguchi	Best Editing The Tropicana Award	
Smitten	Grey Rogers	Best Male Actor: Andrew Gilmore	
Uncle Jonny	Mark Constable	Second	
White Lines	Craig Maclean	Best Original Score	

The Bright Spark Awards were awarded to the shortlisted films My Brother, My Sanctuary (dir. Johnny Tran), Loveless (dir. Karl Madderoom) and Spider (dir. Steven Woodburn).

== 2009 ==
TSI: Spring

Title	Director	Awards Won	Ref
Be My Brother	Genevieve Clay	First	
Be My Brother	Genevieve Clay	Best Male Actor: Gerard O’Duyes	
Being Carl Williams	Abe Forsythe	Second	
Being Carl Williams	Abe Forsythe	Best Comedy	
Fences	Tim Dean	Third	
Fences	Tim Dean	Best Cinematography	
Fences	Tim Dean	Best Screenplay	
Fences	Tim Dean	Best Editing	
Song for a Comb	Sal Cooper	Women in Film	
Song for a Comb	Sal Cooper	Best Animation Award	
Bargain!	Rachel Givney	Best Female Actor: Rebel Wilson	
NYE	Duane Fogwell	Best Original Score	
Jackie's Spring Palace	Matthew Phipps		
Beyond Words	Armand de Saint-Salvy		
Blue	Nathan Stone		
Dream What You Want	Dimitri Ellerington		
Left Unspoken	Avi Lewin		
Notes From A Scaresmith	Scot Edwards		
One in a Million	Tom Vogel		
The Delivery	Gerlee Scanlan, Rohan Jones		
The Furry Cheque Book	Bassett Dickson, Oliver Purser		
The News	Luke Shanahan		

The Bright Spark Award was awarded to the shortlisted film The Chicken Lady (prod. Shanti Rajini).

== 2010 ==
TSI: Dice

Title	Director	Awards Won	Ref
Shock	Abe Forsythe	First	
Shock	Abe Forsythe	Best Comedy	
My Neighbourhood Has Been Overrun By Baboons	Cameron Edser, Michael Richards	Second	
My Neighbourhood Has Been Overrun By Baboons	Cameron Edser, Michael Richards	Best Original Score	
Last Roll Of The Dice	Matthew Chuang	Third	
Last Roll Of The Dice	Matthew Chuang	Best Female Actor: Bel Delia	
Happenstance	John Marsh	Women In Film Award	
Happenstance	John Marsh	Best Male Actor: Clarke	
Testicle	Sheldon Lieberman, Igor Coric	Best Animation	
Fish Lips	Duane Fogwell	Best Editing	
No Dice Hollywood	Paul Watters	Best Screenplay	
No Dice Hollywood	Paul Watters	Best Cinematography	
Awakening	Liam Newton		
Every Second Weekend	Damon Gameau, Gareth Davies		
Falling Backwards	Harrison Murray		
Smoking Will Kill You	Raphael Sammut		
Stakeout	Gene Alberts		
How God Works	Matilda Brown		
Nic & Shauna	Alyssa McClelland		
There Had Better Be Blood	Charles Williams		

=== Telstra Mobile Masterpieces Award ===
Title	Director	Awards Won	Ref
Missing You	Gerry Tacovsky	Winner	
Design Crimes	Jason Van Genderen		
Frequency	Joel Sabadin		

== 2011 ==
TSI: Key

Title	Director	Awards Won	Ref
Big Feet	Brad Wilson, Jonathan Cockett	Shortlist	
The (Ex)terminator	Summer DeRoche	Shortlist	
Squeeze	Will Goodfellow	Shortlist	
Tinman	James Hunter	Shortlist	
In Loco Parentis	Paul Ashton	Shortlist	
Pet	Luke Shanahan	Shortlist	
One Night Stand	David Coussins	Shortlist	
Bars and Tone	Ariel Martin	Shortlist	
Train Girl	Tim Bathurst	Shortlist	
Bird Therapy	Damien Freeleagus	Shortlist	
Animal Beatbox	Damon Gameau	Winner	
A Desperate Need	Matt Bird	Finalist	

=== Telstra Mobile Masterpieces Award ===
Title	Director	Awards Won	Ref
Following	Steve Baker	Winner	

== 2012 ==
TSI: Light Bulb

Title	Director	Awards Won	Ref
Lemonade Stand	Alethea Jones	First	
Boo!	Rupert Reid	Second	
Boo!	Rupert Reid	Best Male Actor: Don Reid	
Boo!	Rupert Reid	Telstra Crowd Pleaser	
Photo Booth	Michael Noonan	Third	
How Many More Doctors Does It Take To Change a Light Bulb?	Marie Patane	Women in Film Award	
Kitchen Sink Drama	Nicholas Clifford	Best Female Actor: Kate McNamara	
Alice's Baby	Eva Lazarro		
I'm Free To Be Me	Trent Holmes, Bassett Dickson		
Jack and Lily	Damian McLindon		
Matchbox Brothers	Scott Holgate, Brent Holgate		
Min Min	Matt Bird		
My Constellation	Toby Morris		
One Thing	Matilda Brown		
RGB	Kailas Prasannan		
The Mistake	Bryan Moses		
The Unusual Suspects	Steve Mitchell		

=== Telstra Mobile Masterpieces Award ===
Title	Director	Awards Won	Ref
	Jason Van Genderen	Winner	

== February 2013 ==
TSI: Balloon

Title	Director	Awards Won	Ref
We've All Been There	Nicholas Clifford	First Best Female Actor: Laura Wheelwright	
Better Than Sinatra	Jefferson Grainger	Second	
Punctured	Nick Baker, Tristan Klein	Third	
Remote	Michael Noonan		
Time		Best Male Actor: Nick Hamilton	
Great Day	Hannah May Reilly		

=== Nikon DSLR Award ===
Title	Director	Awards Won	Ref
Let It Rain	Matt Hardie	Winner	

== December 2013 ==
TSI: Change

Title	Director	Awards Won	Ref
Sorry Baby	Spencer Harvey, Lloyd Harvey		
Bamboozled	Matt Hardie	First	
Sine	Adrian Cabrié		
Truth Is...	Ben Davies		
Off the Meter	Carl J. Sorheim		
Ariel	Claude Gonzalez		
Still Life	Martin Sharpe		
Makeover	Don Percy		
Darkness Comes	John Marsh		
Stew	Steven Woodburn		
Honi soit qui mal y pense	Tom Abood		
The Squirrel King	Dimitri Ellerington		
Charades	Julian Lucas		
Revive	Ruben Pracas		
L.O.V.E. Insurance for the Heart	Rachel Lane		
Coping	Kaiya Jones		

== 2014 ==
TSI: Mirror

Title	Director	Awards Won	Ref
A Bit Rich	Gregory Erdstein		
A Lady & A Robot	Toby Morris	Best Female Actress: Caitlin Scullin	
Cavity	Jacobie Gray		
Evil Mexican Child	Michael Noonan		
FiXeD	Codey Wilson, Burleigh Smith		
Granny Smith	Julian Lucas	First	
Here Today	Joel Kohn		
The Home Video	Nhu Hoang Dang		
Inverse	Liam Connor		
Little Bondi	Michael Demosthenous, Stephen James King		
Red Nuts	Jackson Mullane	Second Best Male Actor: Kevin McIssac	
Shotgun Wedding	Darren McFarlane, Rod Saunders		
Spirit Stones	Millie Rose Heywood		
Twisted	Stuart Bowen	Third	
Untitled	David Karacic, Michael Karacic		
You Wanna Order Pizza?	Laura Hughes		

== 2016 ==
Title	Director	Awards Won	Ref
Shiny	Spencer Susser		

== 2017 ==
TSI: Pineapple

Title	Director	Awards Won	Ref
The Mother Situation	Matt Day	Winner	
Accomplice	Michael Noonan		

== 2018 ==
TSI: Rose

Title	Director	Awards Won	Ref
The Last Time I Saw You	Damian McLindon	Third Best Screenplay Best Editing Best Production Design Best Sound	
Regime	Jessica Phoebe Knox		
Last Man Standing	Lucy Knox, W.A.M. Bleakley		
Rash Decision	John Cavallaro		
The Life I’ve Seen	Dean Ginsburg		
Boys Don’t Cry	Nick Ward	Best Cinematography	
I’m Still Here	Steve Baker	Best Original Score	
Mi País, Tu País	Genevieve Gorman Deane		
Combination Fried Rice	Simon Fowler	Best Male Actor: Hugo Johnstone-Burt	
Rock Bottom	Nick Baker, Tristan Klein	Second Best VFX/Animation	
Don’t Rain On My Parade	Steve Potter, Byron Meers		
Paper Cut	Virginia Gay		
Smooth	Will Green, Joel Phillips		
Cannot Predict Now	Nikki Richardson		
Two Piece	Greta Nash	First Best Actress: Freya Van Dyke	
Phenomena	Izzy Stevens		

=== Holden 7 Second Film Competition ===
Title	Director	Awards Won	Ref
In-Laws	Ben Kumanovski	Winner	

== 2019 ==
TSI: Candle

Title	Director	Awards Won	Ref
Be You T Fool	Brendan Pinches	First	
Comican’t	Rory Kelly	Second	
Allie	Cassie de Colling	Third	
Allie	Cassie de Colling	Cinematography: David Franjic	
Crush	Leela Varghese	Best Female Actress (Tie): Shabana Azeez	
Crush	Leela Varghese	Editing: Pip Hart	
Crush	Leela Varghese	Screenplay: Leela Varghese	
The Last Fight	Edward Copestick, Janyon Bolshoff	Documentary Screenplay: Edward Copestick	
The Validation of Violet Worth	Jayce White	VFX: Jayce White	
Can You Hear Me?	Rama Nicholas, Adam McKenzie	Best Female Actress (Tie): Evelyn Krape	
Notes to Salma	Michael Noonan	Sound: Michael Noonan	
Safe Space	Indianna Bell, Josiah Allen	Original Score: Benjamin Goldman	
Suck It	Claire Worsman	Production Design: Claire Worsman	
The Jinja Assassin	Nathan Keene, Will Faulkner, Matt Henry		
Barry	Emma Vickery		
Dad to the Bone	Simon Fowler		
Treetment	Matt Holcomb		
Fringe Dweller	Leah Annetta, Reuben Street		
Evolution of a Poorly Thrown Snowball	Matthew Quinnell		

== 2026 ==
TSI: Hourglass

Title	Director	Awards Won	Ref
Crescendo	Lianne Mackessy	First	
Crescendo	Lianne Mackessy	Best Female Actor: Laura Bunting	
We Don’t Take Breaks	Jasper Sharpe	Second	
We Don’t Take Breaks	Jasper Sharpe	Best Male Actor: Ben Keller	
Silent Night	Nicky Tyndale-Biscoe	Third	
Silent Night	Nicky Tyndale-Biscoe	Women's Brilliance Award	
No Thank You	Georgina Haig	Creative Acceleration Award	
Project Hourglass	Benjamin Mathews	Best Cinematography: Josh Flavell	
The End	Sean Bayles	Tropicana Award	
Communicate	Frazier Brockett		
Eat Now Pay Later	Dimitri Ellerington		
Faker	Clare Sladden		
Gazers	Veialu Aila-Unsworth, Sze Lok Ho		
I’m Still Here	Catho D’Souza		
Ring Around	Sisi Stringer		
SYD CONFIDENTIAL	Clinton J. Isle		
Tilly	Luke Mayze		
Unprompted	Stephen Packer		

== 2027 ==
TSI: Necklace
