= Stephen Curry (comedian) =

Australian comedian and actor (born 1976)

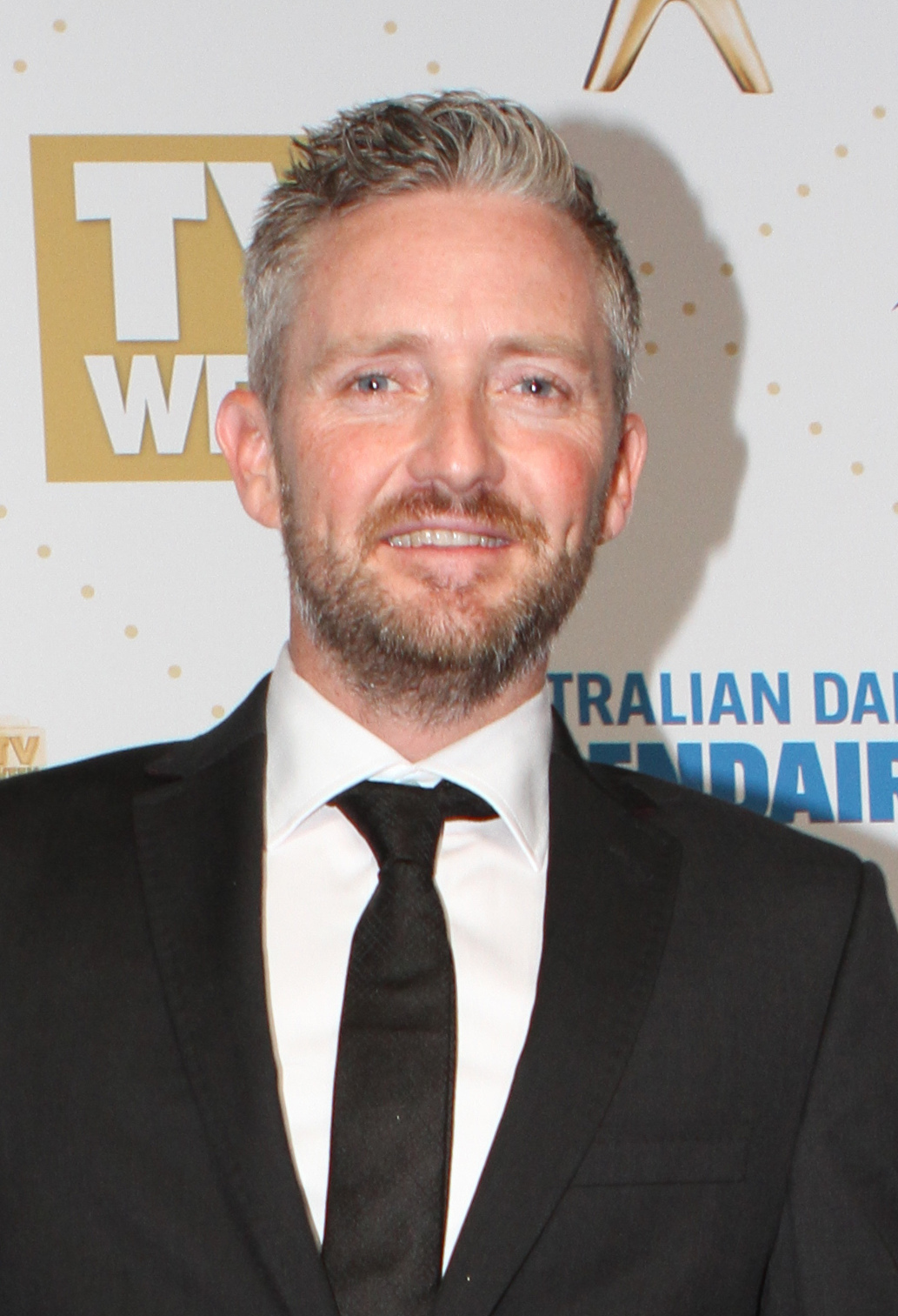
- Curry in 2016
- Born: 26 May 1976 (age 50); Melbourne, Australia
- Education: Marcellin College
- Occupations: Actor, comedian
- Years active: 1992–present
- Notable work: Dale Kerrigan in The Castle; Graham Kennedy in The King
- Spouse: Naadein Crowe (m. 2010)
- Relatives: Andrew Curry (brother); Bernard Curry (brother)

Stephen Curry (born 26 May 1976) is an Australian comedian and actor who has appeared in many television drama and comedy series, and feature films. He first became known as Dale Kerrigan in the 1997 hit comedy The Castle.

== Early life and education ==
Stephen Curry was born in Melbourne on 26 May 1976. The youngest of five children, his elder siblings include television and film actors Andrew Curry and Bernard Curry.

He attended Melbourne's Marcellin College, Bulleen.

He gained early drama experience at Track Youth Theatre.

== Career ==
=== Television ===
In 2001, Curry starred in the sitcom Sit Down, Shut Up playing the role of the computer science teacher. The 2009 American cartoon remake of the series, Sit Down, Shut Up (2009 TV series), directed by Mitch Hurwitz of Arrested Development fame saw Jason Bateman play the role of the science-cum-gym teacher.

In 2001, Curry had a role in the mini-series Changi.

Between 2004 and 2005, Curry had a regular role in the drama series The Secret Life of Us. Curry was a guest on Rove Live on several occasions. He has also appeared on the TV comedy series Thank God You're Here and Spicks and Specks several times, and has once been a guest on Talkin' 'bout Your Generation.

Since 2005, he has appeared in several Toyota Memorable Moments advertisements featuring Australian rules football players such as Wayne Harmes, James Hird, Peter Daicos, Dermott Brereton, Malcolm Blight, Alex Jesaulenko, Tony Lockett, Francis Bourke, Bruce Doull and Kevin Bartlett, and most recently Leigh Matthews with fellow comedian Dave Lawson, doing over-the-top reenactments of well-known moments of historic matches.

In 2007, Curry portrayed Graham Kennedy in The King, a telemovie examining Kennedy's life. The role required Curry to lose 14 kilograms. Also in 2007, Stephen appeared in The Librarians on a recurring basis as a tour guide.

In 2008, Curry hosted the 50th AFI Awards for the Nine Network.

In 2009, Curry had a role in the mini-series False Witness, a role in 30 Seconds and a guest role in Wilfred.

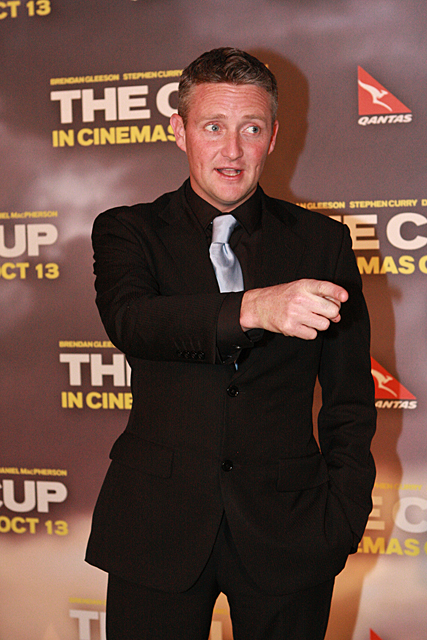
Curry in 2010

In 2011, Curry played Sam Pickles in the Australian drama Cloudstreet, which is based on the novel of the same name by Tim Winton.

In 2012, Curry guest-starred in an episode of the Australian lawyer-drama Rake as Alex Alford.

From 2012 to 2013, He was part of the rotating cast of the Australian drama series Redfern Now as policeman Ryan Hobbs.

During 2013 and 2014, Curry starred in the ABC drama series The Time Of Our Lives.

It was reported in 2021 that Curry would appear in a Paramount+ Australia original series, Spreadsheet.

In 2024, Curry was named to appear in Stan comedy drama Population 11.

In 2025, Curry appeared in the 2025 season of The Amazing Race Australia alongside his brother Bernard Curry, the two went onto to win the series, with Stephen revealing that he almost withdrew from the show due to a knee injury.

On 6 October 2026, it was announced that Curry had joined the filming for the third and final season of The Artful Dodger.

=== Film ===
Curry started out in small roles in film, including The Castle and The Wog Boy. He then went to have leading roles in The Nugget, Take Away and Thunderstruck. In 2007, he was in the Australian film Rogue and The King (2007 film), and also appeared in one of the finalist films, Pig Latin for the 2007 Sony Tropfest.

In 2011, he made The Cup, a biopic where he plays jockey Damien Oliver in the 2002 Melbourne Cup.

In 2012, he appeared as a reporter, in Cliffy, an Australian film based on the efforts of a marathon running 61-year-old potato farmer from Victoria, Cliff Young.

Curry starred in the 2013 Comedy film Save Your Legs! as Abbotsford Anglers Cricket Club President Edward "Teddy" Brown.

=== Theatre ===
Throughout 2010, Curry toured with Shaun Micallef on his Peter Cook/Dudley Moore tribute Good Evening.

Curry appears as King Arthur in the 2026 Australian Tour of Spamalot .

== Personal life ==
Curry and girlfriend of ten years Naadein Crowe married in a small ceremony in Bali in October 2010.

== Filmography ==
=== Film ===
Year	Title	Role	Notes
1995	Silver Strand	Kozlinsky	TV movie
1997	The Castle	Dale Kerrigan	Feature film
1998	The Day of the Roses	Rescuer	TV movie
2000	Cut	Rick Stephens	Feature film
2000	The Wog Boy	Nathan	Feature film
2002	The Nugget	Wookie	Feature film
2003	Take Away	Trev Spackneys	Feature film
2003	The Night We Called It a Day	Ferret	Feature film
2004	Self Serve	Attendant	Short film
2004	Thunderstruck	Ben	Feature film
2007	Pig Latin	John	Short film, 2007 Sony Tropfest finalist
2007	Rogue	Simon	Feature film
2007	The King	Graham Kennedy	TV movie
2008	The Informant	Simon Ford	TV movie
2009	False Witness	Det. Sgt. Neil Trent	TV movie
2011	The Cup	Damien Oliver	Feature film
2012	Christmas Clay	Graham	
2012	Save Your Legs!	Edward "Teddy" Brown	Feature film
2013	Cliffy	Griffin	TV movie
2014	Timothy	Timothy Garrett	TV short film
2016	Hounds of Love	John	Feature film
2020	June Again	Devon	Feature film
2022	Hatchback	Vince	Short film
2022	Thor: Love and Thunder	King Yakan	Feature film
2026	How to Talk Australians	Cop	Film
TBA	Starman †		Filming

=== Television ===
Year	Title	Role	Notes
1992	Late for School	Tim Hickey	TV series, 13 episodes
1993	Snowy	Ginger	TV series
1993–98	Neighbours	Greg Bartlett/Ted Long	TV series, 5 episodes
1995	The Man from Snowy River	Harry Jarvis	TV series, 1 episode: "The Hostage"
1995–98	Blue Heelers	Eddie Dodds	TV series, 3 episodes
1997	Frontline	Trev	TV series, 6 episodes
1997	Raw FM	Ming	TV series, 1 episode: "Desperately Seeking Su Lin"
1997	Eric	Various characters	TV series, 9 episodes Also writer
1998	Good Guys, Bad Guys	Michael MacEvoy	TV series, 1 episode: "Car Wars"
1998	Medivac	Damian "Rhino" Ryan	TV series. 1 episode: "Duty of Care"
1997–98	State Coroner	Steve Capelli/Vin Parry	TV series. 2 episodes
1998	Small Tales & True	Maggots/Rory	TV series, 2 episodes
1999	Queen Cat, Carmel & St Jude	Luke	TV miniseries, 2 episodes
1999	The Mick Molloy Show	Various characters	TV series, 6 episodes
2000	Sit Down, Shut Up	Stuart Mill	TV series, 13 episodes
2001	Changi	Eddie	TV miniseries, 6 episodes
2002	Flipside	Various characters	TV series, 8 episodes Also writer
2002	Marshall Law	Glen	TV series, 1 episode: "Domestic Bliss"
2003	McLeod's Daughters	Clayton Murdoch	TV series, 1 episode: "The Road Home"
2005	The Incredible Journey of Mary Bryant	Allen	TV miniseries, 2 episodes
2004–05	The Secret Life of Us	Stuart "Stu" Woodcock	TV series, 20 episodes
2007	The Librarians	Life Coach	TV series, 2 episodes
2007	Stupid Stupid Man	Chris	TV series, 1 episode: "Appearances are Everything"
2009	:30 Seconds	McBaney	TV series, 6 episodes
2010	Wilfred	Cockatoo	TV series
2011	Some Say Love	Various Characters	
2011	Cloudstreet	Sam Pickles	TV miniseries
2012	Redfern Now	Ryan Hobbs	TV series, 2 episodes
2012	Rake	Alex Alford	TV series, 1 episode: "R vs Alford"
2013	Mr & Mrs Murder	David Wertz	TV series, 1 episode
2013	It's a Date	Jason	TV series, 1 episode
2013	The Time of Our Lives	Herb	TV series
2014	Shaun Micallef's Mad as Hell	The Young Olivia Newton-John/Kerry Packer	TV series, 2 episodes
2014	Fat Tony & Co.	Detective Sergeant Jim Coghlan	TV miniseries
2015	Hiding	John Pinder	TV series, 8 episodes
2015	Open Slather	Various characters	TV series, 8 episodes Also writer
2017	Phrankurtville	William Sharp	
2017	True Story with Hamish & Andy	Joycey	TV series
2018	Pine Gap	Jacob Kitto	TV miniseries
2019	Mr. Black	Peter Black	TV series
2021	Spreadsheet	Matt	TV series
2022	Summer Love	Jonah	TV series, episode: "Jules and Tom & Jonah and Steph"
2023–25	Ten Pound Poms	JJ Walker	TV series: 12 episodes
2023	Bay of Fires	Francis Pike	TV series
2024	Last Days of the Space Age	Mal	TV series: 2 episodes (1.1, 1.7)
2024	Population 11	Noel Pinkus	TV series; 9 episodes
2025	Austin	Cobb Harper	TV series 1 episode (2.5)
2027	The Artful Dodger	Seth Pecksniff	TV series

=== Self television appearances ===
Year	Title	Role	Notes
2023	Blow Up	Co-Host	Self
2022	Would I Lie To You?	Himself	Self
2021	Who Wants To Be A Millionaire	Himself	Self
2019	Play School	Himself	Self
2024	Thank God You’re Here	Himself	Self
2025	The Amazing Race Australia 9	Contestant, with Brother Bernard	

== Accolades ==
Year	Association	Category	Nominated work	Result	Ref.
2007	Australian Film Institute	Best Actor in a Television Drama	The King	Won	
2008	Logie Awards	Most Outstanding Actor in a Series	The King	Won	
2008	ASTRA Awards	Most Outstanding Performance by an Actor – Male	The King	Won	
2017	AACTA Awards	Best Lead Actor	Hounds of Love	Nominated	
2018	Film Critics Circle of Australia Awards	Best Actor	Hounds of Love	Won	
