= Andrew Curry =

Australian comedian and actor

- Born: 2 July 1972 (age 54); Melbourne, Victoria, Australia
- Years active: 1994–present
- Known for: Neighbours
- Spouse: Kate Curry (2002–present)
- Children: 2
- Family: Bernard Curry (brother); Stephen Curry (brother)

Andrew Curry (born 2 July 1972, Melbourne) is an Australian producer and actor who has appeared in many television drama and comedy series, and in feature films.

== Early life ==
Alongside his actor brothers Bernard Curry and Stephen Curry, Curry attended acting classes at the Toorak Players (now known as Track Youth Theatre) in the Melbourne suburb of Glen Iris in the 1980s. Following their time there, they secured agents.

He got his start, appearing in a television commercial for Wedgewood Pies, alongside his brothers. After appearing in several more advertisements, they all began picking up small television roles. Early in his career, he formed a three-piece band with his brothers, called Nev's Vindalooo, referencing their father.

== Career ==
One of Curry's most notable roles was the recurring character of Larry 'Woody' Woodhouse, Stephanie Scully’s (Carla Bonner) ex-boyfriend in Neighbours, who he played from 2000 to 2002. In September 2010, it was announced that Curry would be reprising his role as Woody in Neighbours.

Curry played Kelvin in the 2012 series Conspiracy 365, and had a recurring guest role as Shaun Graves in Something in the Air in 2000. He was a film reviewer / co-host on the Foxtel show Premiere in 2002, and appeared alongside his brothers on 2002 ABC sketch show, Flipside.

He has also had numerous guest roles in television series including Snowy River: The McGregor Saga, State Coroner, Blue Heelers, The Secret Life of Us, Welcher & Welcher, Stingers, Let Loose Live, City Homicide, Satisfaction, Rush, Killing Time, Offspring and The Doctor Blake Mysteries.

Curry's film credits include Point of No Return (1996), Road to Nhill (1997), made-for-tv movie Witch Hunt (1999), The Inside Story (2001), The Merchant of Fairness (2002, BoyTown (2006), The Cup (2011) alongside brother Stephen, Submerge (2013) and A Boy Called Sailboat (2018).

In 2007 he founded iCandy Productions with business partner Cameron Nugent, and has made numerous short films, music videos and corporate presentations. In 2010 he was awarded funding to produce a short film, Spider Walk through Film Victoria's 'Propellor Shorts' funding scheme.

Numerous producer roles have since followed, with 2017 marking the completion of his debut feature film, A Boy Called Sailboat, written and directed by Cameron Nugent. From 2017 to 2018 he spent time in Montana, USA, as a producer on the period feature film Robert the Bruce. 2018 saw him tour the live soundtrack performance of the feature film A Boy Called Sailboat with the Grigoryan Brothers around Australia.

Curry is also skilled at editing, graphic effects and music composition.

== Personal life ==
Curry has been married to wife Kate since 2002 and has a son and a daughter. He is the older brother of actors Stephen Curry and Bernard Curry, who have also made a significant number of appearances on Australian television.

During the COVID-19 pandemic, Curry, together with his brothers, created a rendition of The Beatles’ "Here Comes the Sun" for Melburnians emerging from lockdown. They recruited several high-profile actor friends to collaborate, including Sam Neill, Shane Jacobson, Jane Hall, Susie Porter, Andy Lee, Hugh Sheridan, Bryan Brown and Kate Jenkinson.

== Acting credits ==
=== Film ===
Year	Title	Role	Notes
1996	Point of No Return	Jimmy	Feature film
1997	Road to Nhill	Geoff	Feature film
2001	The Inside Story	Dean Olsen	Feature film
2002	Size Does Matter		Short film
2002	The Merchant of Fairness	Luke	Feature film
2006	BoyTown	Pilot	Feature film
2008	Bottom Dollar	Dougie	Short film
2011	The Cup	Ray Oliver	Feature film
2013	Submerge	Cameron	Feature film
2018	A Boy Called Sailboat	Tobacco Factory Employee	Feature film

=== Television ===
Year	Title	Role	Notes
1995	Snowy River: The McGregor Saga	Miner #1	1 episode
1998	State Coroner	Dean Andrews	1 episode
1999	Witch Hunt	Constable Grady	TV movie
1999	The Adventures of Lano and Woodley	German Beardo	1 episode
1998–2000	The Games	Andrew 'Kid' Curry	3 episodes
1999; 2003–2004	Blue Heelers	Blake Finlayson / Andrew Paterson / Andrew Franklin	4 episodes
2000	Something in the Air	Shaun Graves	3 episodes
2000–2002; 2010	Neighbours	Larry 'Woody' Woodhouse	31 episodes
2002	The Secret Life of Us	Pete Peterson	1 episode
2002	Flipside	Various characters	8 episodes
2002	Premiere	Co-host	
2003	Welcher & Welcher	Article Clerk	1 episode
2003	Stingers	Corey Fletcher	1 episode
2005	Let Loose Live	Various characters	2 episodes
2007	City Homicide	Liam Cunningham	1 episode
2008	Satisfaction	Thomas Silk	1 episode
2008	Rush	MC Investigator	1 episode
2011	Killing Time	Detective Newman	Miniseries, 1 episode
2012	Offspring	Matt	1 episode
2012	Conspiracy 365	Kelvin	10 episodes
2017	The Doctor Blake Mysteries	Maxwell Porter	1 episode
2019	Hotelevision	Father	

=== Video ===
Year	Title	Role	Notes
2006	Talking Time	Captain Musica	Video

=== Video game ===
Year	Title	Role	Notes
2009	Navigating Workplace Relations	Barry	Video game

== Producer / writer credits ==
=== Film ===
Year	Title	Role	Notes
2011	Magic	Producer / Digital Effects	Short film
2011	Spider Walk	Producer / Composer / Digital Effects	Short film
2012	151 Kent Ave	Executive Producer	
2017	Love Notes	Producer	Short film
2017	Into the Black Water	Producer	Short film
2018	A Boy Called Sailboat	Producer / Line Producer / Visual Effects Supervisor	Feature film
2019	Robert the Bruce	Producer	Feature film
TBA	Cape Tribulation	Co-Producer	In development

=== Television ===
Year	Title	Role	Notes
2002	Flipside	Writer	8 episodes
2002	Flipside	Composer	7 episodes
2005	Let Loose Live	Writer	2 episodes
