= Nadia Townsend =

Australian actress

- Born: 27 November 1979 (age 46); Sydney, New South Wales, Australia
- Occupations: Actress; dramaturge; theatre producer
- Years active: 1999–current
- Height: 174 cm (5.7 ft)
- Father: Simon Townsend
- Website: nadiatownsend.com

Nadia Townsend (born 27 November 1979) is an Australian actress and film dramaturge. She portrayed Allie Kingston in the Channel 7 police drama, City Homicide, from 2009 to 2011. In 2009 she appeared in the United States produced science fiction thriller film, Knowing, playing Grace Koestler, alongside Nicolas Cage and Rose Byrne. She was assistant dramaturge on George Miller's film, Mad Max: Fury Road (2015) and served as the dramaturge for the Netflix coming-of-age drama Boy Swallows Universe (2024).

== Biography ==
Townsend was born in Sydney on 27 November 1979 and lived in Gladesville, the younger daughter of television presenter, producer and print journalist, Simon Townsend (1945–2025) and his second wife Rosanna (c. 1950–2003). She grew up with an elder brother (born 1978). Their elder half-sister Lisbeth Kennelly (born c. 1968), had been put up for adoption soon after she was born: her parents (Simon and a former girlfriend) had already separated. The Townsend family were reunited with Kennelly in 1992, she had also become an actress.

As a child, Townsend began ballet lessons but was removed for talking too much. For secondary education she attended Hunters Hill High School, where she befriended fellow future actress, Rose Byrne, in a year 9 Science class. Townsend studied at the Australian Theatre for Young People, Sydney. After meeting visiting United States film and theatre actor, producer and director, Robert Bella, at age 18, she was accepted as a student at his Atlantic Theater Company, New York. She began working in theatre in 1999 and set up her first theatre company, Wolf Whistle. She acted in the Laurie Foell production, Chambres, in March–April 2000 at Belvoir Street Downstairs Theatre, Surry Hills.

Her first television role was playing the "wide-eyed and forever optimistic" Clare Gormley in the ABC drama series Head Start in 2001 for 18 episodes. Townsend took the role of Bec in Matt Bird-directed horror thriller film, Blue Neon (2001). She appeared in the 2004 ABC series Fireflies as Fiona "Fifi" Sharp, a rural fire-fighter. The series was not renewed for a second season. Townsend and her half-sister, Kennelly both acted in a theatre drama, Loss and Gloss (December 2004), co-written by mother-daughter writers, Helen and Sophie Townsend. She took the lead role of Liz, an abductee, in the black comedy feature film, Puppy (2005), alongside Bernard Curry as her abductor.

In 2008, Townsend relocated to Melbourne to study at the Victorian College of the Arts gaining her post-graduate degree in theatre directing. In 2009, Townsend appeared in the US-produced film, Knowing, playing Grace Koestler, opposite Hollywood star Nicolas Cage and Byrne. From August 2009, she portrayed Detective Allie Kingston in the Channel 7 police drama, City Homicide, starting in its third season in the episode, "Meet and Greet". She continued the role in season four (2010) and its mini-series continuation, City Homicide: No Greater Honour (2011).

In June 2013, she appeared in the theatre production of Neil LaBute's Helter Skelter at Old 505 Theatre, Surry Hills. She is also a film dramaturge, a rare job in Australia; she had been mentored by Nico Lathouris. In 2015, she was assistant dramaturge to Lathouris on George Miller's latest instalment of the Mad Max franchise, Mad Max: Fury Road. She is a co-founding member of Turtle Lab, a performance laboratory. In 2016, she appeared in the TV sci-fi thriller film, Restoration, playing Emma Laws. In 2024, Townsend worked as the series dramaturge for the Netflix adaptation of Boy Swallows Universe. Her coaching of 15-year-old lead actor Felix Cameron was highly praised, culminating in Cameron publicly thanking her during his emotional acceptance speech at the Logie Awards, where he won two acting accolades.

== Filmography ==
=== Film ===
Year	Title	Role	Notes
2001	Blue Neon	Bec	
2001	Neophytes and Neon Lights	Atari	
2003	Danny Deckchair	Linda Craig	
2005	Puppy	Liz	Lead role
2007	What They Don't Know	Lucy	Short
2007	Monkeynaut	Able (voice)	Short
2009	Knowing	Grace Koestler	
2010	The Zombie Monologues	Annie	Short
2012	Forget the Noise	Florence	Short
2013	Ten Forty-Five	Gunslinger	Short
2016	Restoration	Emma Laws	
2017	Concealed	Sallie	
2019	Little Monsters	Sara	

=== Television ===
Year	Title	Role	Notes
2001	Head Start	Clare Gormley	Regular role, 18 episodes
2002	My Hero		Episode: "Zero Tolerance"
2002	Farscape	Kim Kupperstein	Episode: "Kansas"
2004	Fireflies	Fiona "Fifi" Sharp	Main role, telemovie + 20 episodes
2005	Life	Nina Pink	TV film
2005–06	headLand	MJ Finnegan	Regular role
2007	Sea Patrol	Clair Watts	Episode: "Rescue Me"
2007	Chandon Pictures	Zoe	Episodes: "Champion Charles", "White Ants"
2009–2011	City Homicide	Allie Kingston	Main role, 47 episodes
2011	Rush	Sarah	Episode: "4.13"
2013	Home and Away	Dr. Peta Bradley	Recurring role
2014	Old School	Rebecca	Episode: "Smash Repairs"
2015	Love Child	Eleanor	Episodes: "2.5", "2.6"
2015	Fresh Blood Pilot Season		Episode: "Wham Bam Thank You Ma'am"
2016	Brock	Pauline Moffat/Sue McCure	TV miniseries
