= Puppy (2005 film) =

2005 film

- Directed by: Kieran Galvin
- Written by: Kieran Galvin
- Produced by: Melissa Beauford
- Starring: Nadia Townsend; Bernard Curry; Sally Bull; Terence Donovan
- Release date: 2005
- Country: Australia
- Language: English

Puppy is an independent Australian feature film starring Nadia Townsend, Bernard Curry, Sally Bull, and Terence Donovan. The film was written and directed by Irish-born Australian Kieran Galvin, who also directed the short films The Burning Boy, Mono-Winged Angel, Contact and Other People. He also wrote the exploitational thriller Feed (directed by Brett Leonard). Both Puppy and Feed were produced by Melissa Beauford.

== Plot ==
Attempting suicide, sultry but down-on-her-luck swindler Liz (Nadia Townsend) is rescued by lonely tow truck driver Aiden (Bernard Curry). But instead of rushing her to the hospital, Liz's saviour abducts her to his remote farmhouse, convinced that she is the wife who abandoned him years earlier. Cut off from civilisation, kept prisoner and guarded day and night by vicious attack dogs, Liz realizes she must rely on her skills as a con artist to talk her way out of this hostage situation.

== Cast ==
- Nadia Townsend as Liz
- Bernard Curry as Aiden
- Terence Donovan as Dr. Holden
- Deniz Akdeniz as Omar

== Reception ==
Puppy received a mix of positive and critical responses. Richard Kuipers of Variety praised the film's twists and oddball tone but noted that its narrative developments sometimes led to "plausibility potholes", suggesting that the story's unusual elements did not always cohere convincingly.

Francesca Rudkin of The New Zealand Herald rated the film 3 out of 5, characterizing it as a "sick twisted puppy of a movie" from Galvin. Rudkin highlighted the film's blend of thriller and black comedy elements, and singled out Townsend's performance as engaging and intelligent, while offering that Curry's portrayal of Aiden, though less assured, grew on the viewer over time.

In a home media review, Ian Jane of DVD Talk was more critical, finding Puppy "slow and predictable" with underdeveloped characters that failed to elicit sympathy. Jane described the acting as "mediocre across the board" and the overall visual presentation as lacking polish, concluding that the film "gets an A for effort but never really takes off", and recommended that viewers skip it.
