= State Coroner =

State Coroner could refer to:

- Coroner an officer of law responsible for investigating deaths
- State Coroner (TV series) an Australian television series on Network ten
