= 2007 Tropfest finalists =

The Tropfest short film festival is held in Sydney, Australia each year. This is the list of 2007's short-listed films and winners.

There was controversy regarding the winning film An Imaginary Life due to similarities to the American television series Foster's Home for Imaginary Friends.

== The Story of Ned ==
Synopsis: John Doyle, as the omnipotent yet not altogether totally reliable narrator, tells the tragic tale of Ned, a little story with a detective yarn for a father and a children's fable for a mother. But in this animation, Ned has a problem: he is a story without an ending.
Director: Simon Weaving
Producer: Simon Weaving
Writer: Simon Weaving
Cinematographer: Dan Miller
Sound design: Mark Webber
Composer: Troy Hambly
Editor: Dan Miller Key
Key Cast: John Doyle, Tony Turner
Length: 6' 50"

== The Grey Cloud ==
Synopsis: This noirish film, set in a crime-ridden city, opens with a man walking a woman down an alley. Nearby is a mysterious piano bar, a place where the music can simply take you away.
Director: Matt Peek, Cam Ford
Producer: Matt Peek, Cam Ford
Writer: Matt Peek
Cinematographer: Cam Ford
Sound design: John Kassab
Composer: Craig Bryant
Editor: Cam Ford
Key Cast: Mick Preston, Katie Astrinakis, John Richards, Brett Cartlidge
Length: 7'
Shot On: Super 16mm
Tropfest Awards: Best Cinematography - Cam Ford

== An Imaginary Life (First Prize) ==
Synopsis: What happens to an imaginary friend once they're forgotten? Where do they go? How do they live? And can their lives ever have any meaning again? For one such imaginary friend, life has been empty. That is, until he finds a potential answer to the one question that's been consuming him this whole time.
Director: Steve Baker
Producer: Steve Baker
Writer: Steve Baker
Sound design: Steve Baker
Composer: Steve Baker
Editor: Steve Baker
Key Cast: Andrew Baker, Steve Baker
Length: 4' 55"
Shot On: Animation
Tropfest Awards: First Prize

== Being Boston ==
Synopsis: When Jeff is dumped by his girlfriend, he buys a cute boxer puppy called Boston to keep him company. But the weeks, then months prove lonely and difficult. Jeff's unpredictable behaviour means it could be some time before Boston makes this man his best friend.
Director: Justin Drape
Producer: Justin Drape
Writer: Justin Drape
Cinematographer: Timothy Laffey
Sound design: Simon Kane
Editor: Simon Njoo
Key Cast: Sean Lynch, Felicity Hopkins, Ashlie Fellow
Length: 5' 4"
Shot On: DV/HD

== Between The Flags ==
Synopsis: How many rioters does it take to start a riot? When two guys from opposing sides of conflict are the first arrivals for a beach riot, they are initially unsure of the accepted etiquette.
Director: Jayce White
Producer: Jayce White
Writer: Jayce White
Cinematographer: Ian Nicholson
Sound design: Jayce White
Editor: Jayce White
Key Cast: Dan Feuerrigel, Matuse
Length: 7' 4"
Shot On: DV/HD
Tropfest Awards: Best Comedy, Best Actor (Matuse)

== Road Rage (Second Prize) ==
Synopsis: On a busy morning on the roads, there's a near traffic accident. One driver, shaken and angry, watches as the offending car speeds away without its driver acknowledging or apologising for the near miss. He decides to chase him down in a quest for revenge, cornering the offender in a nearby street.
Director: Mark Bellamy
Producer: Mark Bellamy, Lyndal Mebberson
Writer: Mark Bellamy
Cinematographer: Simon Harding
Sound design: Rohan Charlton
Composer: Simon Bailey
Editor: Laurie Hughes
Key Cast: Paul Kelman, Alan Flower, Scott Johnson, Freddy Talib
Length: 7'
Shot On: HD
Tropfest Awards: Second Prize; Audience Prize

== Yellow ==
Synopsis: When a well-dressed man climbs into a taxi one night, the tired driver settles in for another boring ride in silence. But things change quickly when the passenger starts talking earnestly about the troubling purpose of the journey. The driver finds himself parked outside a strange house, fearing for his life.
Director: William Allert
Producer: William Allert
Writer: William Allert
Cinematographer: Craig Jackson
Composer: Andy Scott
Editor: Brad Hurt
Key Cast: Nathan O'Keefe, William Allert
Length: 5' 50"
Shot On: HD
Tropfest Awards: Best Screenplay - William Allert

== Pig Latin ==
Synopsis: Two cops startle a woman working in the garden. That's the start of a story about two guys who remember that lucky kid from school who has the pool, the trampoline, the Atari and all that other cool stuff. It's been years since they've seen him, but they still want to play.
Director: Nathaniel Kiwi
Producer: Nathaniel Kiwi
Writer: Nathaniel Kiwi
Cinematographer: Stuart Simpson
Sound design: Andrew Neil
Composer: Mark Farrel
Editor: Nathaniel Kiwi
Key Cast: Stephen Curry, Steven Stagg, Diana Greentree, Charlie Clausen
Length: 5' 40"
Shot On: DVCAM

== Counter ==
Synopsis: A troubled accountant inherits a mysterious counter from a relative, who says "it will make everything clear". But what does it count? Desperate to know the purpose of his inheritance, Neville begins to question everything he does in his daily routine, becoming drawn into an obsessive and life-changing search for meaning.
Director: Michael Noonan (filmmaker)
Producer: Michael Noonan, Carine Chai
Writer: Michael Noonan
Sound design: Michael Noonan
Composer: Michael Noonan
Editor: Michael Noonan
Key Cast: Christopher Sommers, Kat Henry, Catherine Glavicic, Paul Bryan, Michael Carter
Length: 6' 59"
Shot On: HDV

== Real Thing ==
Synopsis: A woman wakes up in bed. Beside her is the man who insists he is her husband. But is he really? She can't remember.
Director: Rupert Glasson
Producer: Hugo O'Conner, Rani Chaleyer
Writer: Rupert Glasson
Cinematographer: Ben Allen
Sound design: Michael McMenomy
Composer: John Gray
Editor: Rani Chaleyer
Key Cast: Slava Orel, Emma Jackson, Jean-Marc Russ
Length: 5'
Shot On: DVCAM
Tropfest Awards: Best Original Score - John Gray

== The Von ==
Synopsis: It is 1982 and a schoolboy Alex Vonzitzavitz—possessor of a cool jacket and superhero card collection—is about to face the most humiliating experience of his life. Remember that nightmare you had about turning up to school naked? This is worse. But don't panic! Superheroes like The Von always find a way to get out of trouble.
Director: John Mavety
Producer: Robyn Sinclair
Writer: John Mavety
Cinematographer: Glenn Hanns
Sound design: Nathan Brand
Composer: Tewe Hanare
Editor: John Mavety, Adam Harley.
Key Cast: Jacob Bicknell, Zeke Collins, Jaime Lee Parker, Gabrielle Desdoigts, Louis Desdoigts, April Hayes Dickson
Length: 6' 59"
Shot On: HD
Tropfest Awards: Third Prize; Sony Foundation Young Talent Award - Jacob Bicknell

== Bad Yoghurt ==
Synopsis: On a hot summer's day, a hot sexy woman sits by a pool. She eats some hot sexy yoghurt. But everything is not as perfect as it seems. The glamour fades when she realises the yoghurt is bad.
Director: Shaun Beagley
Producer: Shaun Beagley
Writer: Shaun Beagley
Cinematographer: Jonas McGuiggin
Sound design: Stuart Welch
Composer: Bernard Houston
Editor: Kurt Royan
Key Cast: Natalie Lynn
Length: 5'
Shot On: 16mm
Tropfest Awards: The Tropicana Award

== Mere Oblivion ==
Synopsis: The title, from Shakespeare, is a reference to growing old. Librarian Kenny Bunkport learns what it means when he takes his elderly grandmother to a swish restaurant.
Director: Burleigh Smith
Producer: Burleigh Smith
Writer: Burleigh Smith
Cinematographer: Jason Thomas
Editor: Ross Farnsworth (i.e., Burleigh Smith)
Key Cast: Burleigh Smith, Elizabeth Caiacob, Michael Su, Kate Ritchie
Length: 7'
Shot On: HDV
Tropfest Awards: Best Female Actor - Elizabeth Caiacob

== A-Z ==
Synopsis: Muz's doctor has bad news: "Your aorta's clogged with fat, all your vital parts are weak". In this animation, that means Muz has to stop eating meat. To break the habit, the doc prescribes a radical new cure that goes from A to Z.
Director: Zenon Kohler
Producer: Zenon Kohler
Writer: Murray Hartin
Still photographer: Greg Desmon
Sound design: Ash Maklad
Composer: Pat Drummond
Editor: Zenon Kohler
Length: 4' 40"
Shot On: Computer generated on a Macintosh with digital stills

== Still ==
Synopsis: When a man and a woman choose the paths they want to take in their relationship, their son is left aside. In this evocative film, there are three lives and two decisions on one still night.
Director: Jayne Montague
Producer: Jayne Montague
Valentina Forno
Assistant Director: Ashleigh Kate Brooks
Writer: Nick Thompson
Cinematographer: Shing Fung Cheung
Sound design: David Stalley
Composer: David Stalley
Editor: Rolmar Baldonado
Key Cast: Jodine Muir, Pete Walters, Giles Penfold,
Length: 6' 41"
Shot On: HD

== Fore! ==
Synopsis: "Golf isn't a game," says Tiger Woods. "It's a choice that one makes with one's life." A man learns the truth of that statement when he heads to the driving range to hit a few balls.
Director: Duane Fogwell
Producer: Stewart Brown
Writer: Duane Fogwell
Cinematographer: Geoff Ellis
Composer: Geir Brillan
Editor: Duane Fogwell
Key Cast: Daniel Bowden, Paul Moxey,
Length: 6' 30"
Shot On: 35mm
Tropfest Awards: Best Editing - Duane Fogwell
