= Genevieve Clay-Smith =

Australian writer and director

- Born: 1988 (age 37–38); Australia
- Education: Hunter School of the Performing Arts
- Occupations: Writer; Film director

Genevieve Clay-Smith (born 1988) is an Australian writer and director. She is an advocate of inclusive filmmaking.

Clay-Smith's career as a writer and a film director began in 2009 when her film, starring a man with Down syndrome, won Australia's largest short film festival, Tropfest. She is the co-founder, former chief executive officer (CEO) and board member of the not-for-profit organisation Bus Stop Films (BSF) and co-founder and Creative Director of the creative agency, Taste Creative.

== Early life ==
Clay-Smith grew up in Newcastle and attended the Hunter School of the Performing Arts in Broadmeadow. As an actress in the local children's theatre called the 'Young People's Theatre,’ she was cast as Nancy Cakebread in the Australian feature film, 15 Almore (1998).

She is an alumna of the Foundation for Young Australians, Young Social Pioneers (YSP) program, where she received a 12-month scholarship to be mentored and trained in social entrepreneurship in 2010.

== Career ==
In 2009 Clay-Smith co-founded the not for profit organisation Bus Stop Films, and she co-founded Taste Creative in 2010. She has been forging pathways for inclusion in the film industry. She has campaigned for the need to incorporate more inclusion and diversity on the film screen and within the media. She has forged a partnership between BSF and AFTRS, facilitating Bus Stop's students with intellectual disabilities access to the film, television and radio industries.

Clay-Smith was a stakeholder and consultant of the 2017 Screen NSW ScreenAbility initiative. She received an AMP Tomorrow Makers grant in 2016 which enabled her to spend 18 months writing Bus Stop Films' Accessible Film Studies Curriculum and turning it into an online resource.

In 2016, Clay-Smith was invited by the NSW Minister for the Arts to join the Arts and Culture Advisory Board Committee, to advise the government and help influence policy on matters pertaining to developing and promoting the arts and culture of NSW.

Clay-Smith has given presentations at the BBC Manchester, the Extraordinary Film Festival in Belgium, Walt Disney Animation Studios HQ in Burbank and the Scottish Mental Health Arts and Film Festival. In January 2018, she finished her first international project in Japan, titled 'Shakespeare in Tokyo', which combined a workshop and professional work experience for six Japanese people with Down syndrome. Shakespeare in Tokyo was launched at the international film festival Short Shorts Film Festival with the Governor of Tokyo Yuriko Koike.

In March 2018, Clay-Smith was invited to deliver the closing keynote speech at the Toronto International Film Festival – Kids section, where she presented on BSF and the power of inclusive filmmaking.

Clay-Smith released her children's book I Didn't Like Hubert in 2018, with all proceeds being donated to the Humpty Dumpty Foundation.

== Awards and recognition ==
Clay-Smith won the award of Young Australian Filmmaker at the 2014 Byron Bay International Film Festival for the film The Interviewer. She was the 2014 winner of the Australian Financial Review and Westpac 100 Women of Influence Award, where she was recognised as the overall winner in the Young Leader category for her contribution to creating inclusion within the film industry.

In 2015, Clay-Smith was named the NSW Young Australian of the Year.

In 2017, she was the winner of the Entrepreneurial Award in the B&T 30 under 30 awards. In the same year, she was awarded the Sidney Myer Creative Fellowship to support her professional work. This is an award of A$160,000 given to mid-career creatives and thought leaders.

In 2018, Clay-Smith and her husband Henry Smith accepted the Optus My Business Award as Taste Creative won the Media, Marketing & Advertising Business of the Year award.

== Filmography ==
Film

Year	Title	Director	Writer
2009	Be My Brother	Yes	Yes
2012	The Interviewer	Yes	Yes
2013	I Am Emmanuel	Yes	Yes
2014	Work Mate	Yes	Yes
2015	Heartbreak and Beauty	Yes	Yes
2016	Under the Sun	Yes	Yes
2017	Inclusion Makes the World More Vibrant	Yes	Yes
2018	Shakespeare in Tokyo	Yes	Yes

Documentary film

Year	Title	Role	Notes
2016	Kill Off	Yes	Yes
2016	Gambling with Minds	Yes	No

Executive producer/Co-producer

- I Am Black and Beautiful (2017)

== Awards and nominations ==
Year	Award	Result
2019	The Australian Financial Review 100 Women of Influence award for Diversity and Inclusion	Won
2019	Telstra Australian Business Women of the Year Awards: National Emerging Leader Award	Won
2019	Telstra Australian Business Women of the Year Awards: New South Wales Emerging Leader Award	Won
2018	Optus My Business Awards - Taste Creative won Media, Marketing & Advertising Business of the Year	Won
2017	Recipient of a Sidney Myer Creative Fellowship	Won
2017	B&T's 30 Under 30 Entrepreneur Award winner	Won
2016	NSW/ ACT Arts and Fashion Young Achiever Award	Won
2016	Human Rights Award for Community Organisation, presented to Bus Stop Films, under the leadership of Genevieve Clay-Smith	Won
2016	Australian Directors Guild Award	Won
2016	Best Student Film for I Am Emmanuel	Won
2016	Screen Australia's Women in Film Gender Matters Project Development Grant recipient	Won
2015	NSW Young Australian of the Year	Won
2015	Women's Weekly Woman of the Future Award	Won
2015	B&T Women in Media award winner for Creative	Won
2015	University of Technology Sydney Young Alumni Award Australian Directors Guild Award Best Direction in a student film for 'I Am Emmanuel	Won
2015	Human Rights and Arts Film Festival award - Best Film for "I Am Emmanuel"	Won
2014	AFTRS and KB Myer Project development grant	Won
2014	Westpac and Financial Review 100 Women of Influence Award Winner for Young Leader	Won
2013	Human Rights and Arts Film Festival award - Best Film for "The Interviewer	Won
2013	Byron Bay Young Filmmaker Award	Won
2009	Tropfest - Best Film for "Be My Brother"	Won
2008	University of Technology Sydney Social Justice Media Award	Won
