= A Boy Called Sailboat =

2018 comedy-drama film

- Film poster
- Directed by: Cameron Nugent
- Written by: Cameron Nugent
- Produced by: Andrew Curry; Richard Gray; Nelson Khoury; Cameron Nugent
- Starring: Lew Temple; Elizabeth De Razzo; Noel Gugliemi; Jake Busey; J. K. Simmons
- Cinematography: John Garrett
- Edited by: Cameron Nugent
- Music by: Leonard Grigoryan; Slava Grigoryan
- Production companies: Yellow Brick Films; Sailboat Productions iCandy Productions
- Distributed by: ITN Distribution
- Release date: 29 April 2018 (Newport Beach)
- Running time: 92 minutes
- Countries: United States; Australia
- Languages: English; Spanish

A Boy Called Sailboat is a 2018 American-Australian comedy-drama film written and directed by Cameron Nugent and starring Julian Atocani Sanchez, Noel Gugliemi, Elizabeth De Razzo, Jake Busey, and J. K. Simmons.

== Plot ==
The film revolves around a poor Hispanic family with a son named Sailboat. Sailboat's friend, Peeti, is obsessed with soccer, but has a disability that prevents him from playing the game. Sailboat finds a "little guitar" (actually a ukulele) in a pile of junk. He learns how to play it, and eventually creates and plays a song for his sick grandmother, who is in hospital.

== Cast ==
- Julian Atocani Sanchez as Sailboat
- Jake Busey as Bing
- J. K. Simmons as Ernest
- Noel Gugliemi as José
- Lew Temple as DJ
- Bernard Curry as Referee / Hacienda Hill Actor / Instructional CD Voice
- Elizabeth De Razzo as Meyo
- Andrew Curry as Tobacco Factory Employee

== Production ==
The film is written, directed, edited, and co-produced by Cameron Nugent. It is his debut feature film as director. The script was drafted over many years, and originally set in Melbourne, Australia, but later transposed to a desert town in New Mexico. It was produced in Silver City, New Mexico. One of the co-producers was Cameron's business partner Andrew Curry, whose family in Melbourne are much involved with the Australian film industry. Andrew's brother, Bernard Curry, plays many bit parts.

Cinematography is by John Garrett. (Note: Gray says "Richard", but John is correct, and he cites some of his films.)

Other producers are Richard Gray and Nelson Khoury.

== Release ==
The Premiere Entertainment Group, based in Los Angeles, has worldwide rights to the film.

The film was classified PG (Parental Guidance recommended) in Australia.

== Reception ==
On Rotten Tomatoes the film has rating of 77%, based on 13 reviews.

It received generally positive reviews from critics. The Sydney Morning Herald called it a "delightfully original family film".

One reviewer likened the film's technique to that of Wes Anderson, in its "hyper-stylized, whimsical settings and symmetrical staging". Another thought the cinematography reminiscent of Wim Wenders' 1984 film Paris Texas.

== Accolades ==
A Boy Named Sailboat was nominated for the AACTA Award for Best Indie Film in the 10th AACTA Awards in 2020.

At the ARIA Music Awards of 2020, its soundtrack was nominated for Best Original Soundtrack, Cast or Show Album.
