= Hunter School of the Performing Arts =

Location
- Broadmeadow, New South Wales; Australia; 32°55′30″S 151°43′42″E

Information
- Former names: Newcastle Junior Technical and Domestic Science School; Broadmeadow Junior Technical School; Newcastle Central Technical School; Broadmeadow Boys High School; Broadmeadow Boys School; Broadmeadow High School (co-educational); Broadmeadow School of Performing Arts
- Type: Government-funded co-educational selective and specialist secondary day school
- Motto: Performing at Our Best
- Established: July 1923
- Educational authority: New South Wales Department of Education
- Specialist: Performing arts
- Principal: Tracey Breese
- Teaching staff: 76.2 FTE (2018)
- Years: 3–12
- Enrolment: 1,155 (2018)
- Campus: Suburban
- Colours: Jade, purple, black
- Website: huntperfor-h.schools.nsw.gov.au

The Hunter School of the Performing Arts (abbreviated as HSPA, also known as Broadmeadow High School) is a government-funded co-educational selective and specialist primary and secondary day school which offers a comprehensive curriculum with a performing arts specialty, located in Broadmeadow, New South Wales, Australia.

Established in 1923, the school enrolled 1,150 students in 2018, from Year 3 to Year 12, of whom four percent identified as Indigenous Australians and eight percent were from a language background other than English. The school is operated by the NSW Department of Education; the principal is now Tracey Breese, as of Term 1 2025. The school is unique in terms of public selective schools to cater to both primary and secondary school students. Enrolment is by audition online and/or on-site.

== History ==
The school has undergone many name changes since its establishment in July 1923.

As a technical school

- 1923–1926: Newcastle Junior Technical and Domestic Science School
- 1927–1931: Broadmeadow Junior Technical School
- 1932–1960: Newcastle Central Technical School

As a general high school

- 1961–1965: Broadmeadow Boys High School
- 1966–1975: Broadmeadow Boys School
- 1976–1992: Broadmeadow High School (co-educational)

As a performing arts school

- 1993–1997: The Broadmeadow School of Performing Arts
- 1998–present: Hunter School of the Performing Arts

A notable moment in this school's recent history was the 2007 New South Wales storms. The Hunter School of the Performing Arts was one of the most severely affected schools in the area. The school suffered a large amount of damage; the entire bottom level was washed away and the school's library was severely affected. The March 2021 eastern Australia floods in New South Wales also affected HSPA by the closure of the school's Hunter Theatre. Due to the downstairs floor featuring an orchestra pit, storage room and boys and girls dressing rooms being flooded and waterlogged which caused a costly amount of collateral electrical damage. The theatre is now partially functional, open to the school and external clients. Since then, Hunter Theatre is now recovered and operating as normal.

== Motto and colours ==
The original motto was "Advance". This changed in 1932 when the girls left, and the motto became Faber est suae quisque fortunae. The motto was changed in 1999 to its English form, "Each of us is responsible for our own destiny". "Performing at Our Best" is the school's current motto.

The original colours of the school were those of the 35th Battalion ("Newcastle's Own Regiment") of World War I, green and brown. In later years it changed to green and white. In 1999, students were surveyed about their preferred school colours and chose jade, purple and black. To keep a link with the Newcastle colours, the new logo (of the mask, dancer and bass clef) has been incorporated into a shield which also has a ribbon of brown and a ribbon of green.

Following the change in the school colours, a new school uniform was introduced in 2000, with options ranging from formal to casual, including performance and sporting wear. In 2001, the school's marching band uniform changed to reflect this as well, formerly being green and gold, and now has a uniform consisting of black, purple and jade.

== Dance ==
There are many dance opportunities within the school. Groups participate in a wide range of activities, including Star Struck, Schools Spectacular, Hunter Schools Dance Festival and State Dance Festival. There is also a range of dance ensembles, such as hip hop and ballet, and these are audition only.

The dance production class gives students an opportunity to do project based learning (PBL) along with student led project design.

== Notable alumni ==
- Genevieve Clay-Smith – film director and writer
- Isabelle Cornish – actress and model
- Charli Robinson – singer, actress and radio presenter, Hi-5
- Michelle Lim Davidson – actress
- Mathew Helm – Olympic diver
- Short Stack – pop punk/indie band (Shaun Diviney, lead vocalist and guitarist; Andy Clemmensen, bassist and back-up vocalist; Bradie Webb, drummer)
- Geraldine Viswanathan – actress
- Danielle Marsh – former member of South Korean girl group NewJeans
- Jasey Fox – Singer
- Rhys Nicholson – Comedian

== See also ==
- List of creative and performing arts high schools in New South Wales
- Education in Australia
