= Bernard Curry =

Australian actor (born 1974)

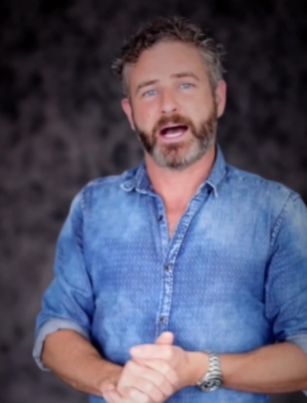
- Born: 27 March 1974 (age 52); Melbourne, Victoria, Australia
- Occupations: Actor, composer, writer
- Years active: 1993–present
- Notable work: Neighbours (1995–96; 2005); Home and Away (2009–10); Wentworth (2016-21)
- Spouse: Sonya Bohlen
- Children: 2
- Relatives: Stephen Curry; Andrew Curry

Bernard Curry (born 27 March 1974) is an Australian actor, best known for his role as Jake Stewart in Wentworth, Luke Handley in Neighbours and Hugo Austin in Home and Away.

== Early life ==
Alongside his actor brothers Stephen and Andrew, Curry attended acting classes at the Toorak Players (now known as Track Youth Theatre) in the Melbourne suburb of Glen Iris in the 1980s. Following their time there, they secured agents.

He got his start, appearing in a television commercial for Wedgewood Pies, alongside his brothers. After appearing in several more advertisements, they all began picking up small television roles. Early in his career, he formed a three-piece band with his brothers, called Nev's Vindalooo, referencing their father.

== Career ==
Curry's first major television role was teenager Michael Logan in the 1993 series Snowy, who became involved in a student-teacher romance with Lilian Anderson, played by Rebecca Gibney. In 1995, he joined the main cast of Neighbours as Luke Handley. He remained on the television series for just over a year. He later returned to the show in a video cameo appearance in 2005 for the show's 20th anniversary.

Curry was a co-writer and actor on the 2002 ABC sketch comedy series Flipside. In 2002, he starred in the American television movie Junction Boys. He later starred in the 2005 feature film Puppy and the 2007 TV film The King. Curry was also the host of the comedy series Monster House on the Nine Network. In 2008, he appeared in the BBC-commissioned soap opera Out of the Blue, playing Nate Perrett. In late 2008, Curry had the small role of Vishnu on Packed to the Rafters, on the Seven Network.

In 2009, Curry joined the soap opera Home and Away as regular cast member, playing the part of Hugo Austin, and remained until 2010. He hosted the first four seasons of reality tv series Beauty and the Geek Australia, from 2009 to 2012, after which hosting duties were taken over by James Tobin for two years and then Sophie Monk.

Curry appeared as sports agent Jesse Reade in the 2013 first season of the American sports drama VH1 series, Hit the Floor. He had recurring roles in mystery drama series Pretty Little Liars (2013) as Jamie Doyle, romantic comedy series Faking It (2015) as Principal George Turner and fantasy adventure series Once Upon a Time (2013–2016) as Liam Jones. He also had guest roles in several other American television series including NCIS (2012), Ravenswood (2014), CSI: Crime Scene Investigation (2014), Mistresses (2015) and Blindspot (2017). He also played opposite Tom Sizemore as Baz in 2014 film Bordering on Bad Behavior.

In 2016, Curry joined the cast of Wentworth as corrupt officer Jake Stewart. Curry revealed that he almost said no to the role as he was busy with his career in LA, but his close friend Sullivan Stapleton advised him to audition for the show as Wentworth had become popular with viewers during its first three seasons. Curry joined the cast for filming in season 4 and remained until the show's final season. Curry has stated that Wentworth was one of the best jobs he has ever had.

From 2019 to 2021, Curry had a main role as D.I. Kieran Hussey in Australian/New Zealand television series My Life Is Murder, for 11 episodes.

In 2020, Curry posted a video to his Instagram where he and several other prominent figures from Melbourne sung a version of "Here Comes the Sun", with the aim of keeping up the spirits of a Melbourne lockdown due to COVID-19.

In August 2021, he was announced as a contestant on the celebrity version of Big Brother Australia, alongside former Olympian Caitlyn Jenner, Meghan Markle’s brother Thomas Markle Jr, former MAFS Australia participant Jessika Power, Australian Survivor alumni Luke Toki and model/actress Ellie Gonsalves. He lasted twelve days before being evicted, coming in eighth place.

In 2022, Curry joined the cast of ABC crime drama miniseries Savage River as Connor Kirby. That same year, he played the part of Bob in the 2022 season of Melbourne Theatre Company's production of A Christmas Carol, returning again for the 2023 season. He also filmed the 2023 horror comedy teen series Crazy Fun Park, playing the part of Zach Dante.

In 2024, Curry was announced as part of the cast for action thriller film The Ice Road 2: Road to the Sky, alongside Liam Neeson.

In 2025, Curry and his brother Stephen Curry took part in the celebrity version of The Amazing Race Australia. In October 2025, the brothers had taken the victory for their chosen charity. On 7 September 2026, Curry was announced as part of the 2027 season of Australian Survivor.

On 14 February 2026, Curry was named for the film Love, Wine & Valentine.

== Personal life ==
Curry is married to Sonya Bohlen and they have two sons together. In April 2024, Curry and his family moved from Melbourne's Burwood East to Brisbane, Queensland, after his wife secured a job at the Queensland Performing Arts Centre (QPAC).

Curry is an advocate for mental health and its services and he is an ambassador for the mental health charity OneInFive.

== Filmography ==
=== Film ===
Year	Title	Role	Notes
1991	Get Real	Tim	Short film
1996	Black Sun		Short film
1999	Ripe	Elder Nance	Short film
2000	The Dish	Newspaper reporter	
2004	Alpha Male	Office Worker	Short film
2005	Puppy	Aiden	
2014	Bordering on Bad Behavior	Baz Darwish	
2015	Impact Earth	Tim Harrison	
2015	Baby, Baby, Baby	Oliver	
2017	Almost Broadway	Zac	
2017	Live or Die in La Honda	Joe Cooper	
2018	A Boy Called Sailboat	Referee / Hacienda Hill actor / Instructional CD voice	Also additional sound recordist
2019	Dark Place	Barry	Anthology film
2025	Ice Road: Vengeance	Professor Evan Myers	Feature film
2026	Love, Wine & Valentine	Kane Lonigan	Film
TBA	To Fly A Kite	John	Short

=== Television ===
Year	Title	Role	Notes
1993	Snowy	Michael Logan	Main role
1994	Time Trax	Older Bill	1 episode
1994	Law of the Land	Craig Berryman	1 episode
1994; 2003; 2004; 2006	Blue Heelers	David Edwards / Ty Birkenstock / Jed Stone / Andrew Gillfllan	4 episodes
1995	Halifax f.p.	Adam Lawler	1 episode
1995–1996; 2005	Neighbours	Luke Handley	171 episodes
1997	Fully Booked	Himself	1 episode
1998	Raw FM	Gary	1 episode
1998	The Genie from Down Under	Prince Umberto	1 episode
1998	State Coroner	Nigel Arrowsmith	1 episode
1999	Thunderstone	Funky Dave	1 episode
2000	Something in the Air	Sean Wright	3 episodes
2000	The Big Schmooze	Himself	1 episode
2001	Sit Down, Shut Up	Greg Ilyich	1 episode
2001	Blonde	Assistant to Director J.	TV film
2001	Abschied in den Tod	Jerome Delaunay	TV film
2001	Stingers	Dr. James Steele	1 episode
2002	The Road from Coorain	Bob Ker	TV film
2002	Flipside	Various characters	Also writer and composer
2002	The Junction Boys	Johnny Haynes	TV film
2003	CrashBurn	Glenn	1 episode
2003	MDA	Troy Dalmer	1 episode
2006	Wicked Science	The Director	1 episode
2007	The King	John Wesley	TV film
2007	Days of Our Lives	Hugo Austin	
2008	Out of the Blue	Nate Perrett	10 episodes
2008	Packed to the Rafters	Vishnu	2 episodes
2009	Satisfaction	Jack	4 episodes
2009–2011	Home and Away	Hugo Austin	426 episodes
2012	NCIS	Seamus Quinn	1 episode
2013	Pretty Little Liars	Jamie Doyle	3 episodes
2013	Hit the Floor	Jesse Reade	Recurring role 5 episodes
2013	Killer Reality	Jack Silverman	TV film
2013, 2015, 2016	Once Upon a Time	Captain Liam Jones	3 episodes
2014	Ravenswood	Jamie Doyle	1 episode
2014	CSI: Crime Scene Investigation	Calvin Tate	1 episode
2015	Mistresses	Joe the Waiter	1 episode
2015	Faking It	Principal George Turner	7 episodes
2016–2021	Wentworth	Jake Stewart	Main role 62 episodes
2017	Hoges: The Paul Hogan Story	Mike Willesee	Miniseries; 1 episode
2017	Blindspot	Lawrence	2 episodes
2017	Sunshine	Dean Simic	Miniseries; 2 episodes
2018	How to Stay Married	Adam	1 episode
2019–2021	My Life Is Murder	Detective Inspector Kieran Hussey	Main role 11 episodes
2020	Drunk History Australia	John Kerr	1 episode
2021	Ms Fisher's Modern Murder Mysteries	Dr. Clifford Gill	1 episode
2021	Fires	Nick the Journo	Anthology series 1 episode
2021	Spreadsheet	Nathan	1 episode
2022	Savage River	Connor Kirby	6 episodes
2023	Crazy Fun Park	Zach Dante	9 episodes

=== Other appearances ===
Year	Title	Role	Notes
2008	Monster House	Host	
2009–2012	Beauty and the Geek Australia	Host	34 episodes
2016	All Star Family Feud	Contestant	1 episode
2021	Who Wants to Be a Millionaire?	Contestant	1 episode
2021	Big Brother VIP	Contestant	6 episodes
2025	The Amazing Race Australia	season 9 - Celebrity Edition Contestant, with Brother Stephen	
2027	Australian Survivor	Contestant	

== Theatre ==
Year	Title	Role	Notes
1997–1998	Snow White and the Seven Dwarfs	The Prince	Hexagon, Reading
2003	Les Liaisons Dangereuses	Danceny	Playhouse, Melbourne with MTC
2022; 2023	A Christmas Carol	Bob Cratchit	Comedy Theatre, Melbourne with The Old Vic Company & GWB Entertainment
2024	Black Box	Laurie Coombes (Voice Over Artist)	Cremorne Theatre, Brisbane with Grey Gum Productions & Tinderbox Productions
