= Trop Jr =

Australian film festival

Trop Jr is a short film festival featuring films produced by Australians aged 15 years and younger. Trop Jr has been part of the Tropfest film festival since 2008 and is held in Sydney, Australia each year. Trop Jr is billed as "The Worlds Largest Short Film Festival for Kids! By Kids!".

It abruptly stopped in 2019 because of COVID-19, and has not happened since.

Each year, Trop Jr has a theme of a "signature item", an item or action being incorporated in the entry films to ensure that they are unique and are made specifically for Trop Jr. The films must be seven minutes or less. The prize includes a digital camera, an ABC3 educational filmmaking experience and film and television short courses.

== History ==
Trop Jr has been included as part of the Tropfest program since 2008, when 8 films were entered into competition. It had been planned for three years, and has support from the Australian Children's Television Foundation, Boomerang and the Cartoon Network.

One of the judges in 2009, when 12 films were screened, was child actor Brandon Walters. Around 150 films were entered in 2010, of which 14 were finalists including two separate films by a brother and sister; the elder brother won. The 2008 runner-up also made the finals in 2009. The 2011 winner, "Imagine", was inspired by Inception, and was made on a camera phone for A$70 over three days.

Year	Winner	Runner-up	Signature item
2008	Guy Verge Wallace, "Poor Joshua Verde"	Jasmin-Johanna Mobbs, "Besties"	Green
2009	Gabriel Colomb, "Dry Water: The Making Of"	Andrew Mills, "Big Bad Baz"	Squeeze
2010	Peter Richardson and Josh Raish, "Every Coin Has Two Sides"	Sam Wickham, "D'Amoure Courte"	Dot
2011	Simeon Bain, "Imagine"	Emily Williamson & Mayfield State School, "The Groundsman"	Fan
2012	Max Barden and Tim Sheehan, "Let's Make A Movie"	Yianni Rowlands, "The I Think You Stink Show"	Juice
2013, Feb	Ben McCarthy, "Bumper"	Harri Gilbert & The Screen Seekers Club, "How to Make a Horror Movie"	Jump
2013, Dec	Adrian Di Salle, "The Adventures Of Lucy"	Oliver Levi-Malouf, "Penelopes Penguins"	Monster
2014	Paige Bebee, "Chance"	Jobe Adams, "Buloo"	Fly
2016	Yianni Rowlands, "Chess people"	Isaac Haigh, "Ding Dong"	Button
2017	Nick Ward, "Pupils"	Jordan Blanch, "The Lemonade Stand"	Mask
2018	Tadji Ulrich, "Outcasts Anonymous"	Austin Macfarlane, "The Sock Dimension"	Rainbow
2019	Katerina Alexander, "Rewire"	Charlotte McLaverty, “Social”	Pizza
