= Restoration (2016 film) =

- Theatrical film poster
- Written by: Stuart Willis; Matthew Clayfield
- Directed by: Stuart Willis
- Starring: Craig McLachlan; Grant Cartwright; Stephen Carracher; Nadia Townsend; Rosie Lourde
- Music by: David Barber
- Country of origin: Australia
- Original language: English

Production
- Producer: Toby Gibson
- Cinematography: Hugh Turral
- Editor: Cindy Clarkson
- Production company: Midnight Snack Productions

Original release
- Network: 9Go!
- Release: 6 August 2016

Restoration is a 2016 Australian made-for-TV science fiction thriller film directed by Stuart Willis. It premiered in Australia on 6 August 2016 on 9Go! and screened on Stan from November 2016. It was released in September 2019 as a DUSTx Original Series. Producers are now developing the concept into a long-form series.

In 2019, Restoration was ranked #11 in Web Series World Cup's "All Time" Rankings for most awarded and acclaimed web series since 2015 and was crowned the overall Sci-Fi Champion. It was ranked #11 in the Web Series World Cup in 2018, and #19 in 2017.

== Premise ==
In a near-future world, where individuals have their memories downloaded for backup, a man awakes in a body that is not his own.

== Cast ==
- Grant Cartwright as Oliver Klein
- Stephen Carracher as Gavin Worth
- Craig McLachlan as Andrew Majury
- Nadia Townsend as Emma Laws
- Rosie Lourde as Talia Klein
- Ailís Logan as Dr Francis Parr
- Ellen Grimshaw as TLS Technician

== Accolades ==
Award	Category	Subject	Result
Australian Cinematographers Society	Victoria & Tasmania Gold Award - Drama or Comedy Series & Telefeatures	Hugh Turral	Won
ADG Award	Best Direction in an Online Drama	Stuart Willis	Nominated
ASE Award	Best Editing in a Drama Non-Feature	Cindy Clarkson	Nominated
AWGIE Award	Best Drama or Comedy, Other Form	Stuart Willis; Matthew Clayfield	Nominated
IAWTV Awards	Best Dramatic Series		Nominated
New Zealand International Film Festival	Festival Award for Best Producer	Toby Gibson	Won
Raindance Film Festival	Webfest Award for Best Directing	Stuart Willis	Won
