= Gabby Millgate =

Australian actress, writer and comedienne

Gabby Millgate is an Australian actress, writer and comedian best known for her role in the film Muriel's Wedding (1994) and comedy sketch shows Full Frontal (1993) and Totally Full Frontal (1998).

== Early life ==
Millgate was born and grew up in Canberra, and attended Merici College.

== Career ==
=== Television ===
Millgate was part of the ensemble cast of Full Frontal from 1997 until the show's conclusion in 1999. She was also a writer on the show.

In 2002, she was a contestant on Channel Ten's reality series Celebrity Big Brother, and in 2012, appeared on another reality show, Channel Nine's Excess Baggage.

In 2003, she had a guest role in McLeod's Daughters, and a small guest role in 2011's At Home with Julia.

=== Film ===
Millgate appeared in the 1994 hit film, Muriel's Wedding, playing Muriel's sister, Joanie. Her line "You're terrible, Muriel" became a frequently used expression in Australia.

In 1998, she had a role in Babe: Pig in the City. In 2006, she appeared in Feed.

=== Radio ===
In December 2005, Millgate was announced as host of B105's new breakfast show with comedians in Mike van Acker and Stewart ‘Stav’ Davidson. The breakfast show started in January 2006.

== Filmography ==
Film
| Year | Title | Role | Notes |
|---|---|---|---|
| 1994 | Muriel's Wedding | Joanie Heslop | |
| 1998 | Babe: Pig in the City | Female Officer | |
| 1998 | Dags | Muriel Video Addict | |
| 2003 | The Ball | Ada | Short film |
| 2004 | Danger Spot | Peta | Short film |
| 2005 | Australian Pie | Beryl Smith | |
| 2005 | Feed | Deidre | |

Television
| Year | Title | Role | Notes |
|---|---|---|---|
| 1997 | Full Frontal | Various | Season 5 (20 episodes) |
| 1998–1999 | Totally Full Frontal | Various | Seasons 1 & 2 (29 episodes) |
| 1998–1999 | Petals | Poppy | Season 1 (30 episodes) (voice role) |
| 2000 | Variety Show At the End of the World | Roving Reporter | |
| 2003 | McLeod's Daughters | Amanda Mowbray | Season 3, episode 11: "Repeat Offenders" |
| 2011 | At Home With Julia | Gillard Impersonator | Season 1, episode 4: "Citizens' Assembly" |
