= Bordering on Bad Behavior =

- Directed by: Jac Mulder
- Written by: Ziggy Darwish
- Produced by: Leigh Ferreira; Richard Lackey
- Starring: Tom Sizemore; Oz Zehavi; Bernard Curry
- Cinematography: Justin Youens
- Edited by: Paul Spiers
- Music by: Simon Malherbe
- Production companies: TT Film Productions; Muddville; Zen HQ Films
- Release date: 2014
- Running time: 85 min
- Countries: South Africa; United States
- Language: English

Bordering on Bad Behavior is a 2014 comedy film, written by Ziggy Darwish. and directed by Jac Mulder, starring Tom Sizemore, Bernard Curry and Oz Zehavi. The film was produced by Chris Roland, Leigh Ferreira and Richard Lackey, and was executive produced by Yola Raydan and Ziggy Darwish.

Bob (Tom Sizemore) is a U.S. soldier stationed at an Israeli communications base in the Golan Heights, his only company is Ari, an angry Israeli soldier (Oz Zehavi). When an Australian Arab, Baz, (Bernard Curry) accidentally stumbles into the base, locking the door behind him overnight for six hours, Tom is forced to resort to some highly unconventional methods to keep the peace.

== Cast ==
- Tom Sizemore as Bob
- Oz Zehavi as Ari
- Bernard Curry as Baz

== Plot ==
The film focuses on the three soldiers, one American, one Israeli and one Arab who find themselves trapped in a secret remote communications base. Despite conflicting views, backgrounds and prejudices, the three have only one night to find common ground and work together if any of them are to remain alive.

Bob is a middle aged redneck political science nerd recruited by Israel to teach new equipment. He is only one day from completing his assignment and heading out to Dubai. Bob is tasked to train Ari, an angry, hot tempered European Jew seeking vengeance for the tragic loss of his family in an explosion on the streets of Tel Aviv. Baz is a member of the Australian army, who is in Lebanon visiting family and finds himself on the wrong side of the border after dark.

Addressing serious issues and timely questions in a comedic manner, Bordering on Bad Behavior tackles many deeply rooted issues in a manner that highlights the common humanity on all sides of the age old conflicts that plague the Middle East, and impact the world far beyond its borders.

== Production ==
The original working title for the film was Three Pegs, which persisted through much of the production. Dubai based production company Muddville brought in production company Zen HQ films, based in Cape Town, South Africa, led by producer Chris Roland to facilitate pre-production and principal photography on location in and around Cape Town.

Casting was undertaken by Jeremy Gordon and Beth Lipari of Gordon Lipari Casting in the U.S. for the three lead roles, and Bonnie Lee Bouman in South Africa for the supporting characters.

== Release ==
The film was distributed in the United States by Inception Film Partners, and worldwide rights reside with Montecristo International Entertainment. The film was released under the name Bordering in Italian cinemas on 25 August 2016, distributed by Whale Pictures.

== Accolades ==
Bordering on Bad Behavior won Best Feature Comedy at The Indie Gathering International Film Festival in Hudson, Ohio in 2014. It was also chosen to receive "Audience Choice" award and "Best Supporting Actor" for Oz Zehavi, as well as being nominated for "Best Lead Actor" (Tom Sizemore) and "Best Director" (Jac Mulder).

The film also won "Best Film" at the Lebanese Film Festival in Sydney, and screened during Cannes, Marche du Film on 16 May 2015.
