= The King (2007 film) =

- Written by: Jaime Browne; Kris Mrksa
- Directed by: Matthew Saville
- Starring: Stephen Curry; Stephen Hall; Shaun Micallef
- Music by: Bryony Marks
- Country of origin: Australia
- Original language: English

Production
- Producer: Jason Stephens
- Cinematography: Leilani Hannah
- Running time: 100 minutes
- Budget: A$2.1 million

Original release
- Network: TV1
- Release: 20 May 2007

The King: The Story of Graham Kennedy is an Australian television film examining the life of Australian entertainer Graham Kennedy.

Produced in Australia by the Sydney based independent production company Crackerjack Productions for TV1 and the Nine Network, The King was first shown on 20 May 2007 on TV1 for Foxtel and Austar and became the highest rating drama ever screened on subscription television in Australia, drawing 511,000 viewers. It later aired on the Nine Network on 27 August 2007.

The film faced criticism from some of those close to Kennedy who felt it did not portray him accurately, feeling that he was portrayed too broadly in a dark manner in the film, as well as what one commentator noted was a "mad rush to out him, sexually".

== Production ==
The screenplay was written by Jaime Browne and Kris Mrksa; the director was Matthew Saville, and the producer was Jason Stephens. Filming began on 6 December 2006 with a A$2.1 million budget and a 20-day shooting schedule.

The ABC's Ripponlea studios were utilised to film the scenes for sequences involving Kennedy's roles on In Melbourne Tonight and Blankety Blanks.

Stephen Curry (who plays the role of Graham Kennedy) lost 14 kilograms to portray the young Kennedy, and then regained the weight in two weeks over Christmas 2006 to play the older Kennedy.

== Cast ==
- Stephen Curry as Graham Kennedy
- Stephen Hall as Bert Newton
- Shaun Micallef as Colin Bednall
- Monica Maughan as Nan
- Jane Allsop as Noeline Brown
- Angus Sampson as Ugly Dave Gray
- Steve Bisley as Harry M. Miller
- Leo Taylor as Sir Frank Packer
- Beau Brady as Tim
- Bernard Curry as John Wesley
- Kodi Smit-McPhee as Young John Wesley
- Beth Buchanan as Val Wesley
- Garry McDonald as Nicky Whitta
- Roz Hammond as Kathleen Whitta
- Kate Doherty as Panda
- Cathy Godbold as Rosemary Margan
- Todd MacDonald as Richard Croft
- Thomas M. Wright as Alfie

== Reception ==
=== Pre-release ===
A Herald Sun article published on 28 November 2006 headed "Pals protect mate" reported that Kennedy's friends Bert Newton, Noeline Brown and her husband TV writer Tony Sattler were "refusing to help producers of a telemovie about his life."

The article stated that "Bert Newton knocked back an approach to work on The King, telling industry sources Kennedy would not have approved of his story being told" and quoted Sattler as saying "He was never himself, always playing the character called Graham Kennedy, so I don't know how they'd find someone who could manage to play the part." It also stated "The movie is not linked with [the] controversial book "The King & I", launched in the prior month by Kennedy's former lover, Rob Astbury."

=== Post-release ===
Kennedy's biographer Graeme Blundell wrote in The Australian:

Stephen Curry gets most of this right in his compelling portrayal of the sphinx-like and teasingly evasive television comedian [...]

He is so very, very good his career may never recover. The "Weren't you Graham Kennedy?" syndrome will likely pursue him every time he tries to buy groceries. As it did the King [...]

Curry is terrific and, although instantly recognisable as the oyster-eyed performer, doesn't impersonate him (though he says he tested prosthetic eyes) so much as inhabit him [...]

== Awards ==
At the 2007 Australian Film Institute Awards The King won the award for Best Telefeature or Miniseries. Curry also picked up the award for Best Lead Actor in a Television Drama and Saville for Best Direction in Television.

== See also ==
- List of biographical films
