= Flipside (Australian TV series) =

Australian television series

Flipside is an Australian television comedy series produced by the ABC in 2002. The seven episode, 30 minute sketch comedy series was written and performed by actors and comedians. It was directed by Nicholas Bufalo with Producer Madeline Getson, Executive Producer Andrew Friedman and Script Editor Michael Ward. It has also screened on Foxtel's The Comedy Channel.

== Cast ==
- Gerard Cogley
- Andrew Curry
- Bernard Curry
- Stephen Curry
- Fiona Harris
- Nathaniel Kiwi
- Katrina Mathers
- Steven Stagg
- Monica Maughan

== See also ==
- List of Australian television series
- List of programs broadcast by ABC (Australian TV network)
