= Kieran Galvin =

Australian director and screenwriter

- Born: 5 May 1966 (age 60); Australian
- Citizenship: Irish-born Australian
- Occupations: film director and screenwriter

Kieran Galvin (born 5 May 1966) is an Irish-born Australian film director and screenwriter. He wrote and directed four award-winning short films (The Burning Boy, Bad Ass Mono-Winged Angel, Contact, Other People), before he made his debut feature film (as writer and director), Puppy in 2005. Also in 2005 he was commissioned to write the thriller Feed for American film director Brett Leonard (Virtuosity, Lawnmower Man, Man-Thing). In 2017, his first novel, "Nadia Wants To Be A Man. Again," a darkly funny political satire, was published.
