= Spreadsheet (TV series) =

Television series

- Genre: Comedy drama
- Created by: Kala Ellis
- Written by: Kala Ellis
- Directed by: Darren Ashton; Sian Davies
- Starring: Katherine Parkinson; Rowan Witt; Robbie Magasiva; Katrina Milosevic; Stephen Curry; Ryan Shelton; Zahra Newman; Kerry Armstrong; Richard Piper; Maila Latukefu; Harper Nichols; Christie Whelan Browne
- Country of origin: Australia
- Original language: English
- No. of seasons: 1
- No. of episodes: 8

Production
- Executive producers: Catherine Nebauer; Rick Maier
- Production location: Melbourne
- Production company: Northern Pictures

Original release
- Network: Paramount+
- Release: 20 October 2021

Spreadsheet is an Australian comedy-drama television series on Paramount+. The eight-part series was created and written by Kala Ellis. It is distributed internationally by ITV Studios, and will broadcast in the UK on Channel 4.

The show was developed in-house at Northern Pictures by Kala Ellis and Darren Ashton, who were joined in the writers room by writer Romina Accurso and comedian Rhys Nicholson.

Funding was agreed for a second series in August 2022.

== Premise ==
Lauren is a divorced mother-of-two and working lawyer who enjoys casual sex with many men. With the help of best friend Alex, she develops a spreadsheet to track and manage her sex life, but ends up with even more complications.

== Cast ==
=== Main / regular ===
- Katherine Parkinson as Lauren
- Rowan Witt as Alex
- Stephen Curry as Matt
- Katrina Milosevic as Ange
- Robbie J. Magasiva as Jake
- Ryan Shelton as Simon
- Zahra Newman as Helena
- Kerry Armstrong as Carol
- Richard Piper as Roger
- Christie Whelan Browne as Nancy

=== Guests ===
- Anne Edmonds as Sally (1 episode)
- Bernard Curry as Nathan (1 episode)
- Brett Swain as Peter Cook (1 episode)
- Georgina Naidu as Mrs Allen (2 episodes)
- Richard Davies as Greg (2 episodes)
- Justin Rosniak as Dale (1 episode)
- Nazeem Hussain as Cop (1 episode)

== Episodes ==
No.	Title	Directed by	Written by	Original release date
1	"Condoms & Cornichons"	Darren Ashton	Kala Ellis	20 October 2021
2	"Whose Dick is This?"	Darren Ashton	Kala Ellis	20 October 2021
3	"Lipstick & Nits"	Darren Ashton	Kala Ellis	20 October 2021
4	"Three Shags & Call Me Christ"	Darren Ashton	Kala Ellis	20 October 2021
5	"Banjos & Dirty Duck"	Sian Davies	Romona Accurso and Kala Ellis	20 October 2021
6	"Where is this Sex Party?"	Sian Davies	Kala Ellis	20 October 2021
7	"Rockstars & Clutterjunk"	Sian Davies	Kala Ellis	20 October 2021
8	"Crossed Wires & Cuckoo Clocks"	Sian Davies	Kala Ellis	20 October 2021
