= Cameron Nugent =

Australian actor

- Born: 1974 (age 51–52)
- Occupations: Actor, director, writer, producer
- Years active: 1988–present

Cameron Nugent (born 1974) is an Australian actor, director, writer and producer.

== Early life ==
Nugent began his acting career at the age of 12, when an uncle approached him to appear in a commercial for National Nine News in 1986. Soon afterwards, he was approached by an acting agency.

== Career ==
In 1989, Nugent scored the lead role as Tiger Gleeson in children's television series Round the Twist. He also starred as C.W. in a 1990 episode of More Winners, for which he was nominated at the age of 14, for the 1991 AFI Award for Best Actor in a Leading Role in a Television Drama for the episode, "The Big Wish". He had further lead roles as Mick in the 1991 children's miniseries Ratbag Hero, Craig Jelly in SeaChange from 1998 to 2000, Max Hammer in Noah and Saskia in 2004, and Paul Winston in City Homicide from 2007 to 2010.

He has had guest roles in The Flying Doctors, A Country Practice, Neighbours, Law of the Land, State Coroner, The Genie from Down Under 2, Halifax f.p., Stingers, Blue Heelers, Rush and Winners & Losers.

Nugent has also had main roles in the comedy films Boronia Boys (2011) and Boronia Backpackers (2022). His other film credits include 1996 romantic comedy Hotel de Love with Aden Young and Saffron Burrows, 1997 teen drama thriller Blackrock alongside Heath Ledger, 2007 drama The Jammed and 2010 drama Matching Jack opposite Jacinta Barrett and Yvonne Strahovski.

At the age of 22, Nugent was studying his final year of law, with the aim of working in copywriting and publishing and to only continue acting as a hobby.

Years later, he studied at Deakin University, turning his focus towards television and film production, as the university's Varsity Week director, and writer and director of a number of short films. He founded the production company iCandy Productions, directing videos for Australian bands Kisschasy and Angelas Dish, receiving a YouTube Commendation for an Australian view record.

His first feature was about animal cruelty in India, ATAAC: A Documentary. He then wrote, produced and directed the short films Smoking Will Kill You (selected for Cannes Film Festival), Magic and Spider Walk, among others. He also directed an anti-racism commercial, for which he received an advertising nomination at the Cannes Lions International Festival of Creativity in France.

In 2018, he notably wrote, directed and produced the Australian-American comedy drama film A Boy Called Sailboat starring Jake Busey and J. K. Simmons. It was nominated for Best Indie Film at the 10th AACTA Awards, as well as winning a slew of awards at overseas film festivals including the Prescott Film Festival, Newport Beach Film Festival, Boston Film Festival and the International Youth Film Festival.

== Personal life ==
Nugent met wife Skye during his mid-thirties in Prahran, Melbourne. Not long after they were married, Skye’s cancer resurfaced, spreading to her liver and she died five years later, in 2015. Nugent embarked on the “To Lorne with Love” charity run in 2023, running 153km from Prahran to Lorne in honour of his late wife and raised over $200,000 for actor friend Samuel Johnson's charity Love Your Sister.

== Acting credits ==
=== Film ===
Year	Title	Role	Notes
1996	Hotel de Love	Young Man she Kisses	
1997	Blackrock	Jason	
2002	The Merchant of Fairness	Aiden	
2003	Prisoner Queen – Mindless Music & Mirrorballs	Warren	
2007	The Jammed	Steve	
2010	Matching Jack	Constable	
2011	Boronia Boys	Kane Daniels	
2012	151 Kent Ave	Cam	
2013	The House Cleaner	Terry	
2022	Boronia Backpackers	Kane Daniels	
TBA	The Honeysuckle Sisters	Budgie Bugeja	In post-production

=== Television ===
Year	Title	Role	Notes
1988	The Gerry Connolly Show	Various characters	3 episodes
1989	The Flying Doctors	Buster Malarvy	1 episode
1989	Round the Twist	Tiger Gleeson	10 episodes
1990	More Winners	C.W.	Episode: "The Big Wish"
1991	Ratbag Hero	Mick	Miniseries
1991	A Country Practice	Mark Young	1 episode
1981–1992	Kelly	Richard Langers / Race Announcer	4 episodes
1994	Neighbours	Kid #1	1 episode
1994	Law of the Land	Todd Rankin	1 episode
1997–1998	State Coroner	Shane Hopkins / Tim Roe	2 episodes
1998	The Genie from Down Under 2	Surfer #1	1 episode
1998–2000	SeaChange	Craig Jelly	28 episodes
1999	Halifax f.p.	Kevin Witherspoon	1 episode
2001	Stingers	Ricky Knox	1 episode
2002	The Angel Files	Jonathon Crane	
1996; 1999; 2003	Blue Heelers	Derrick Hobson / Jordan Mackenzie / Liam Conroy	4 episodes
2004	Noah and Saskia	Max Hammer	9 episodes
2005	Life	Steven Lyness	TV movie
2009	Rush	Tony Ellis	1 episode
2007–2010	City Homicide	Paul Winston	8 episodes
2016	Winners & Losers	Steve Ford	1 episode
2019	Hotelevision	Auditioning Actor	
2020	Perfect Chaos	Cam	2 episodes
TBA	The Wonderful World of Nancy Nancy	Phillip Soden	Miniseries

== Directing / writing / producing ==
=== Film ===
Year	Title	Role	Notes
2010	Smoking Will Kill You	Co-producer	Short film
2011	Magic	Director / Writer / Editor	Short film
2011	Spider Walk	Co-producer / Editor	Short film
2012	Salty Black Sugar	Editor	Short film
2012	151 Kent Ave	Writer / Editor	
2014	Love Notes	Producer / Editor	Short film
2017	Into the Black Water	Producer	Short film
2018	A Boy Called Sailboat	Director / Writer / Producer / Editor	
2019	Robert the Bruce	Producer	
2025	Flo's Special Day	Writer / Producer	Short film
TBA	The Honeysuckle Sisters	Producer	In post-production

=== Television ===
Year	Title	Role	Notes
2019	Hotelevision	Director	
2020	Perfect Chaos	Director / Writer	1 episode

== Awards and nominations ==
Year	Work	Award	Category	Result
1991	More Winners (episode, "The Big Wish")	Australian Film Institute Awards	Best Actor in a Leading Role in a Television Drama	Nominated
2018	A Boy Called Sailboat	Prescott Film Festival	Director's Choice Award (Indie Spirit Award)	Won
2018	A Boy Called Sailboat	Newport Beach Film Festival	Audience Award for Best Family Film	Won
2018	A Boy Called Sailboat	Boston Film Festival	Best Director	Won
2018	A Boy Called Sailboat	Boston Film Festival	Beat Screenplay	Won
2019	A Boy Called Sailboat	Adelaide International Youth Film Festival	Jury Award for Best Overall Film	Won
2020	A Boy Called Sailboat	10th AACTA Awards	Best Indie Film	Nominated
