= Snowy (TV series) =

- Genre: Drama Thriller
- Directed by: Ian Gilmour (5 Episodes) Paul Moloney (7 Episodes)
- Starring: Rebecca Gibney Neil Melville Lucy Bell Bernard Curry Catherine Wilkin Jochen Horst Annie Jones William McInnes Charlie Powles Bill Kerr
- Country of origin: Australia
- Original language: English
- No. of seasons: 1
- No. of episodes: 13

Production
- Executive producer: Kris Noble
- Producers: Roger Le Mesurier & Roger Simpson
- Production locations: Daylesford, Victoria, Australia
- Running time: 50 minutes
- Production company: Simpson Le Mesurier Films

Original release
- Network: Nine Network
- Release: 8 September – 11 November 1993

Snowy is an Australian television drama thriller series that screened on the Nine Network in 1993 and was produced by Simpson Le Mesurier Films. The program was not renewed for a second season.

== Synopsis ==
Snowy was set around the project to build the Snowy Mountains Hydro-Electric Scheme in 1949. The Logan family run a small hotel in the remote and peaceful township of Cooma. The building of the Snowy project turns the Snowy Mountains region into a wild new frontier with the surge of hopeful immigrants, shady hustlers and colourful characters.

== Cast ==
- Rebecca Gibney as Lilian Anderson
- Neil Melville as Jack Logan
- Lucy Bell as Kate Logan
- Bernard Curry as Michael Logan
- Catherine Wilkin as Molly Logan
- Jochen Horst as Wolfie Heimer
- Annie Jones as Eva Kovac
- William McInnes as Max Heimer
- Charlie Powles as Bernie O'Donnell
- Bill Kerr as Stuart McLachlan
- Wynn Roberts as Alf Rutherford
- Cliff Ellen as Cec Brookes
- Mike Bishop as Les Tremain
- Peter Curtin as Older Michael
- Alan Fletcher as Harry Jarvis (1 episode)
- Brett Climo as Gordon King (1 episode)
- Jacek Koman as Jenda (1 episode)

== Episodes ==
No. overall	No. in season	Title	Directed by	Written by	Original release date
1	1	"Dams, Schemes and Dam Schemes"	Paul Moloney	Roger Simpson	8 September 1993
...
2	2	"Mick's Cafe"	Paul Moloney	Vincent Gil	8 September 1993
...
3	3	"Beware of Snakes and Spiders"	Paul Moloney	David Boutland	9 September 1993
...
4	4	"The Belly of the Beast"	Paul Moloney	Graeme Koetsveld	16 September 1993
...
5	5	"Shadows in the Dark"	Paul Moloney	David Allen	23 September 1993
...
6	6	"Blood Rush"	Paul Moloney	Peter A. Kinloch	30 September 1993
...
7	7	"Lilian"	Paul Moloney	Katherine Thomson	7 October 1993
...
8	8	"Song of the Siren"	Ian Gilmour	Vincent Gil	14 October 1993
...
9	9	"Sweetheart, Sweet Oblivion"	Ian Gilmour	Robyn Sinclair	21 October 1993
...
10	10	"High Claim, Higher Title"	Ian Gilmour	David Boutland	28 October 1993
...
11	11	"Codes of Conduct"	Ian Gilmour	David Allen	4 November 1993
...
12	12	"Loves Rocky Road"	Ian Gilmour	Mac Gudgeon	11 November 1993
...
13	13	"Farewell, My Love"	Ian Gilmour	Roger Simpson	11 November 1993
...

== Home media ==
Umbrella Entertainment released the complete series in May 2013 on DVD, Blu-Ray and on their steaming site.

Title	Format	Ep #	Discs	Release date	Bonus Features	Distributors
Snowy (Complete Series)	DVD	13	4	1 May 2013	Documentary: The Forerunner	Umbrella Entertainment
Snowy (Complete Series)	Umbrella Streaming	13	-	1 May 2013	Documentary: The Forerunner	Umbrella Entertainment

== Content Held By (National Film and Sound Archives) ==
Season Title	Episodes	NFSA Content	Available For Viewing
Snowy	13/13	All 13 Episodes Production Stills Production Documents	

== See also ==
- List of Australian television series
