= Feed (2005 film) =

- Theatrical release poster
- Directed by: Brett Leonard
- Written by: Kieran Galvin; Alex O'Loughlin; Patrick Thompson
- Produced by: Melissa Beauford
- Starring: Alex O'Loughlin; Patrick Thompson; Gabby Millgate; Jack Thompson
- Cinematography: Steve Arnold
- Edited by: Mark Bennett
- Music by: Gregg Leonard; Geoff Michael
- Production companies: Honour Bright Films; Becker Films International
- Distributed by: Force Entertainment (AUS); TLA Releasing (US) Unearthed Films (US)
- Release dates: 12 May 2005 (Cannes); 17 February 2006 (UK); 31 March 2006 (US)
- Running time: 101 minutes
- Country: Australia
- Languages: English; German

Feed is a 2005 Australian body horror crime film directed by Brett Leonard. The plot involves a police investigation of the paraphilia known as feederism.

== Plot ==
Australian cop, Jerome (Patrick Thompson) works as a cybercrime investigator for Interpol but is left shaken after investigating a case in Hamburg, Germany in which a man consented to having his own penis cut off and eaten by his lover. Jerome's own relationship is also troubled due to his frequent travel and difficulties with romantic intimacy, and he finds himself unable to respond positively to his girlfriend's sexual overtures. The two have violent sex and she leaves him after writing "pig" on his chest with lipstick.

Meanwhile, Jerome has been working with his partner, Nigel (Matthew Le Nevez), to investigate a fetish website that features morbidly obese women shown being fed high-calorie food. The website's intricate encryption suggests that the webmaster is concealing a deeper perversion and, despite the objections of his superiors, Jerome travels to Toledo, Ohio so as to investigate the webmaster and determine the whereabouts of "Lucy", a former site favorite. In Ohio, the site's sadistic webmaster, Michael Carter (Alex O'Loughlin), holds Deirdre (Gabby Millgate) captive in a ramshackle cottage in the woods. After questioning a local priest, Michael's adoptive sister and his wife, Jerome manages to track Michael to the cottage, where the latter is preparing to feed Deirdre a thick slurry of eggs and weight gain powder. Jerome learns that Michael developed a sexual fascination with obese women due to his troubled relationship with his overweight, immobile mother, who died when he was a child. He also uncovers further depths to Michael's fetish website: Not only are paying site members able to watch him feed and fornicate with obese women, but they can place bets on when each woman will die, using posted statistics on their body proportions, blood pressure, and other medical indicators.

In the cottage, Jerome finds Lucy's decaying remains and then confronts Michael who reveals that he killed his mother and fed Lucy until she died. The slurry-like preparation he was attempting to feed Deirdre through a tube contains some of the fat he'd carved from Lucy's body. After a struggle, Jerome shoots Deirdre, who maintains her love for Michael even as Jerome tells her about his deceptions, and two shots can be heard off screen.

The final scene reveals Jerome living in suburban bliss with Michael's adoptive sister. He takes some sandwiches she has packed for him and drives to the cottage in the woods, where he eats them with gusto, pausing to tantalize Michael, who is in a wheelchair, with one. Michael, starving and emaciated, begs Jerome to "feed [him]."

== Cast ==
- Alex O'Loughlin as Michael Carter
- Patrick Thompson as Jerome Jackson
- Gabby Millgate as Deirdre
- Jack Thompson as Richard
- Rose Ashton as Abbey
- Matthew Le Nevez as Nigel
- David Field as Father Turner

== Reception ==
On Rotten Tomatoes, the film has a 57% rating based on 7 critic reviews.
