= Michael Noonan (filmmaker) =

Australian filmmaker, author and academic

- Born: Michael Joseph Noonan; Melbourne, Australia
- Occupations: Director, writer, producer, academic

Michael Noonan is an Australian filmmaker, author and academic. He is a seven-time finalist at Tropfest, the world's biggest short film festival, a two-time AWGIE nominee, and winner of Best Documentary at the Inside Film Awards.

His PhD in film and television production, titled Laughing & Disability: Comedy, Collaborative Authorship and 'Down Under Mystery Tour', was the subject of significant international controversy, some calling it "misanthropic and amoral trash", and others celebrating it as an "important contribution" to the representation of disability.

== Features, documentaries and television ==
Anomaly (2026) Noonan wrote the original screenplay for the comedy film Anomaly, which is being produced by Searchlight Pictures. The screenplay, originally titled Gobbledygook, was a finalist in The Academy of Motion Picture Arts and Sciences' Nicholl Fellowships in Screenwriting in 2023.

Unlikely Travellers (2007) Six people take a life-changing trip to Egypt, each with a challenging intellectual disability. They have more baggage than the average tourist, but no less passion. Their two-week trip will test them against the elements, their fears and obsessions and a culture they know little about. The film screened at the Brisbane International Film Festival in 2007 and won the IF Award for Best Documentary in the same year. It was broadcast nationally in Australia over three nights (starting Monday, 19 November 2007) on ABC Television.

Down Under Mystery Tour (2010) An intellectually-disabled film director, who wants to make a TV show featuring two blondes travelling around Australia, is forced to use disabled actors instead and must resort to sabotage, violence, voodoo and murder to get them off his set. The film won a Bronze Palm Award at the Mexico International Film Festival in 2010.

(s)truth (2003) Noonan wrote one of a series of short mockumentaries, which played with and subverted the documentary and drama genres. The series was broadcast on SBS-TV, Australia.

== Novels ==
Noonan's debut novel, Childproof, was released on 13 September 2022. His second novel, Hand On The Run, will be released through Little A Books (Amazon) on November 10, 2026.

Hand On The Run (2026) Released on 10 November 2026.

Childproof (2022) When all their friends start young families and their dinner-party lifestyle is ruined, a wealthy couple hires an assassin to kill all the children and restore the adults-only decadence that completes them. Literary Titan called it "a full-on dark comedy that will entertain and shock readers."

== Short films ==
Noonan has worked as a writer, director, producer and editor on an extensive number of short film works. These include:

Notes To Salma (2019) A woman's strange daily routine comes unstuck. The film screened at Parramatta Park on 9 February 2019, winning the award for Best Sound Design.

Accomplice (2017) Troubled by his owner's nocturnal activities, a little dog decides to take action. The film screened at Tropfest 25 at Parramatta Park in Parramatta, Australia on 11 February 2017; it was broadcast via free-to-air television on Channel Eleven, and streamed live on Redbull TV.

Evil Mexican Child (2014) In the middle of the Mexican desert, an unsuspecting couple discover a strange, abandoned child with terrifying powers. The film screened at Tropfest 2014 at Centennial Park in Sydney, Australia, and on broadcast television on SBS2, on 7 December 2014. It was described as "an awesome little film" with "incredibly authentic production design" and "flawless Spanish".

Remote (2013) In the middle of the Mexican desert, a man named Carlos is running out of time. The film screened at Tropfest in Sydney, Australia on 17 February 2013.

Photo Booth (2012) Three soldiers find a photo booth in the middle of a war-torn landscape and soon realise it carries a strange but disturbing message for each of them. The film screened at Tropfest in Sydney, Australia in 2012, where it won third-prize. It also screened at the St Kilda Film Festival in May 2012.

Captive (2012) A confused old man finds a mysterious leaflet in his letterbox and begins to suspect that his name, his home, and the one he calls his "soulmate" are not what they appear to be. The film screened at the St Kilda Film Festival in May 2012 and was selected as one of 13 films to tour regional Victoria, Australia in June/July 2012. It also screened at Flickerfest, Australia's only Academy Award qualifying festival in January 2013.

Cecil (2009) Cecil, a demented serial killer, is running out of potential victims until he discovers Facebook—which opens up a whole new world to him. The film screened at the Palm Springs International Festival of Short Films in 2010.

Counter (2007) A troubled accountant inherits a mysterious counter that counts for no apparent reason, propelling him on a desperate and ultimately life-changing search for meaning. The film screened at Tropfest in 2007

Applause (2006) Struggling to find motivation, office worker Werner Brim is confronted with a most unusual situation – replacing the couch and coffee table in his office is a live audience...and they want to be entertained. The film screened at Tropfest in 2006 and won the award for Best Screenplay.

Recall (2005) Nothing usually happens at Graham's Electrical Goods Store in the middle of nowhere. But today is different. The man on the phone says there has been an urgent product recall. The Omega GT238 is potentially dangerous. Graham only sold one of those and she isn't answering her phone. Can a clumsy old man get to his customer on time? Or will he be too late? The film screened at many international festivals, including AFI Fest in Los Angeles and Flickerfest. The script was nominated for an AWGIE Award in 2006.

The People (2004) A bickering couple and their children struggle to come to terms with a strange presence in their home. The film screened at the St Kilda Film Festival in 2002 and at the Tiburon International Film Festival in March 2004.

Fragile (2003) Layth Horrex used to live on the edge: fast cars, death defying stunts, danger at every turn. But things have changed since 'she' left. The script for the film was nominated for an AWGIE Award in 2004.

The Last Aussie Hero (1999) Kip Shearer has a dream: to compete at the 2000 Olympics in Sydney. There's just one problem—his event isn't actually part of the Olympics yet... but that's a minor technicality.

== Awards ==
- Noonan's screenplay Gobbledygook, was a finalist in The Academy of Motion Picture Arts and Sciences' Nicholl Fellowships in Screenwriting in 2023. It is being produced as the feature film Anomaly by Searchlight Pictures.
- Three of Noonan's feature film scripts, Alternate Ending, Childproof and The Lupis Escape, made the semi-finals of The Academy of Motion Picture Arts and Sciences' Nicholl Fellowships in Screenwriting in 2014, 2015 and 2017.
- Noonan won the Silver Page Award in the PAGE International Screenwriting Awards in 2021 for his comedy feature The Week After
- Noonan's scripts Alternate Ending and The Lupis Escape reached the finals of the Script Pipeline competition in 2016.
- Noonan's feature film script The Lupis Escape reached the finals of the Austin Film Festival screenplay competition in 2016.
- Noonan's feature film script Ned Gets To Kill was a finalist of the PAGE International Screenwriting Awards in 2020. His thriller Alternate Ending made the semi-finals of the PAGE International Screenwriting Awards in 2016.
- Noonan won third prize at Tropfest in 2012 for his film Photo Booth.
- He won Best Screenplay at Tropfest in 2007 for his film Applause.
- His film Unlikely Travellers won the prize for Best Documentary Feature at the Inside Film Awards in 2007.
- Down Under Mystery Tour, Noonan's PhD film, won a Bronze Palm Award at the Mexico International Film Festival in 2010.

== PhD controversy ==
Noonan began his PhD at Queensland University of Technology in 2007, having previously completed a Master of Arts (Research) and a Bachelor of Arts (Film and Television Production). The research project, then titled Laughing at the Disabled: Creating Comedy that Confronts, Offends and Entertains involved the production of a TV show starring two men with intellectual disabilities.

At the one-year mark of his candidature on 20 March 2007, Noonan presented his thesis-in-progress to staff and students at QUT as part of his Confirmation Seminar. The material presented at the seminar "had been screened and approved by an ethics audit committee, an external psychologist and representatives of a disability group."

Two senior academics at the university, Gary MacLennan and John Hookham, took exception to the subject matter Noonan presented, which included clips from the unfinished TV show. MacLennan was reported as saying to Noonan: "I have a handicapped child and I pray to God that my child never comes into contact with someone like you."

After the seminar, in April 2007, MacLennan and Hookham published an attack on the thesis in the Higher Education section of the national daily newspaper The Australian. In their article, they wrote that they could "no longer put up with the misanthropic and amoral trash produced under the rubric of postmodernist, post-structuralist thought", and the "last straw" was the Noonan thesis presentation. MacLennan and Hookham wrote: "For us, it was a moment of great shame and a burning testimony to the power of post-structuralist thought to corrupt."

Based on descriptions of Noonan's project in the article, many external groups and disability organisations condemned Noonan's work as "degrading".

A subsequent review of the ethical approval process for the project found "no evidence of harm, discomfort, ridicule or exploitation to the participants". The five-person panel noted "the positive enthusiasm of the participants involved, their treatment with dignity and sensitivity, and the warm way in which they were welcomed into the particular community where filming had occurred".

QUT suspended the lecturers for six months without pay on misconduct charges following complaints from a student and an academic, a decision which provoked debate on various blog sites.

QUT defended its decision, asserting that MacLennan and Hookham had breached the university's code of conduct: "a breach of the code of conduct was proven in relation to each of the allegations made" and "the disciplinary action taken by the vice-chancellor is within the range of disciplinary measures available under the code for such breaches".

Professor Stuart Cunningham, Director of the ARC Centre for Excellence in Creative Industries, wrote a piece in defense of QUT and Noonan in The Courier-Mail called 'Taking Arts into the Digital Era'.

Michael Noonan posted an extended response in The Australian on 5 September 2007, entitled 'I am the one who has been humiliated'. The article countered many of the claims made by Hookham and Maclennan. Noonan wrote: "Hookham and MacLennan have claimed that their concerns about my work were ignored by me and the internal channels within the university. This is untrue. Their outburst at my confirmation was unsettling and abusive, but I sought to address their concerns...On the night following my confirmation seminar, I emailed Hookham and MacLennan to discuss their concerns: 'I'd really appreciate talking more to you both about your thoughts about my PhD project'. I was met with condescension and rejection. MacLennan's email finished with the line: 'When you start trying to offend the rich and the powerful I might be interested in a conversation'...Hookham and MacLennan's behaviour since my confirmation has not been a spontaneous overreaction; it has been a deliberate and premeditated assault on my PhD candidacy and my career. Based on their false description of my footage, Hookham and MacLennan emailed undergraduate students, inciting them to rally against me, to condemn my work and all those associated with me. These attacks have continued to this day".

MacLennan and Hookham initiated legal action against QUT and later accepted a confidential payout and resigned from the university.

Noonan launched defamation proceedings against Hookham and MacLennan in the Brisbane District Court in June 2009. His PhD, under the title Laughing & Disability: Comedy, Collaborative Authorship and 'Down Under Mystery Tour' was completed in 2010.
