= State Coroner (TV series) =

- Genre: Drama
- Created by: Michael Harvey
- Country of origin: Australia
- Original language: English
- No. of seasons: 2
- No. of episodes: 28

Production
- Executive producers: Bruce Gordon; John Kearney; David Rouse
- Producer: David Taft
- Running time: 60 minutes
- Production companies: Crawford Productions; Harvey Taft

Original release
- Network: Network Ten
- Release: 14 August 1997 – 23 November 1998

State Coroner is an Australian television series screened on Network Ten in 1997 and 1998. There were two series produced with a total of 28 episodes.

The series was set in the State Coroner's office complex and featured investigations into deaths, murders, suicides, accidents and natural causes. The drama begins from the initial inquiry through to the courtroom appearances, the Coroner's final verdict and recommendations for trial or reform.

== Cast ==
=== Main / regular ===
- Wendy Hughes as Kate Ferrari
- Bob Baines as Clive Trimble
- Andrew Clarke as Colin Decker
- Christopher Stollery as Dermot McLeod
- Elaine Smith as Julie Travers
- Nick Carrafa as George Cardillo
- Elise McCredie as Sharon Riley
- Kristian Pithie as Paul Weiss
- Christopher Gabardi as Daniel Ferris
- James Reyne as Liam Pearce
- Robert Grubb as Hugh Ferrari
- Asher Keddie as Claire Ferrari
- Paul Cronin as Ted Ames
- Jennifer Botica as Liz Mason
- Martin Jacobs as Frank Kelso
- Alan Dale as Dudley Mills
- Richard Moss as Gascoyne
- Jerome Pride as Roly Fox
- Peter Hosking as Phil Daly
- Alan Hopgood as Keith Summers
- Roger Oakley as Barry Randall

=== Guests ===
- Alex Menglet as Jim Vandenburg (1 episode)
- Alex Papps as Dr Hamish Campbell (1 episode)
- Amanda Douge as Lee Turkel (1 episode)
- Andrew Blackman as David Hubbard (2 episodes)
- Andrew Curry as Dean Andrews (1 episode)
- Bernard Curry as Nigel Arrowsmith (1 episode)
- Brett Swain as Ray Scullin (2 episodes)
- Brett Tucker as Miles Penfield (1 episode)
- Cameron Nugent as Shane Hopkins / Tim Roe (2 episodes)
- Christopher Milne as Bryce Hall (1 episode)
- Diana Glenn as Gillian Gardener (1 episode)
- Debra Byrne as Tracy Dabovich (1 episode)
- Elspeth Ballantyne as Pat Thompson (1 episode)
- Fletcher Humphrys as Mick (2 episodes)
- Gemma Bishop as Megan Bennett (1 episode)
- Gerald Lepkowski as Dave Warren (1 episode)
- Greg Stone as Sgt Frank Johnson (1 episode)
- Jane Allsop as Kirsty Wilson (1 episode)
- Janet Andrewartha as Eileen Hardy (1 episode)
- John Atkinson as Dylan McQuarie
- John Brumpton as Clint the Hirer (1 episode)
- John O'May as Marcus Brophy (2 episodes)
- Kick Gurry as Josh (1 episode)
- Laurence Breuls as David Randell (1 episode)
- Louise Siversen as Cheryl Norton (1 episode)
- Nell Feeney as Sally Allbright (1 episode)
- Nicholas Bell as Provis (1 episode)
- Reg Gorman as Charles Shaw (1 episode)
- Renai Caruso as Jo Zammit (1 episode)
- Sheryl Munks as Heather O'Connor (1 episode)
- Sullivan Stapleton as Bullbar Benson / Darren Pyke (2 episodes)
- Steven Vidler as Salmon (1 episode)
- Tommy Dysart as Robert Ash (1 episode)
- Tony Nikolakopoulos as Theo (1 episode)

== Series overview ==
Series	Episodes	Originally released	
Series	Episodes	First released	Last released
1	14	14 August 1997	13 November 1997
2	14	24 August 1998	23 November 1998

== Episodes ==
Episode information retrieved from the Australian Television archive.

=== Season 1 (1997) ===
No. overall	No. in series	Title	Directed by	Written by	Original release date
1	1	"Starting with a Bang - Telemovie Pilot"	Paul Maloney	Michael Harvey	14 August 1997
2	2	"A Bit of Asthma"	Robert Klenner	Michael Harvey & Bill Garner	21 August 1997
3	3	"The Price of Success"	Ian Gilmour	Deborah Parsons	28 August 1997
4	4	"Coming to Grief"	Chris Thomson	Graham Hartley	4 September 1997
5	5	"The Final Approach"	Chris Thomson	John Reeves	11 September 1997
6	6	"Shortcut to Death"	Ian Gilmour	Bill Garner	18 September 1997
7	7	"Partings"	Ian Watson	Patrick Edgeworth	25 September 1997
8	8	"A Question of Experience"	Ian Watson	Mandy Brown	2 October 1997
9	9	"Truth and Circumstances"	Robert Klenner	Barbara Bishop	9 October 1997
10	10	"Conflict of Interest"	Robert Klenner	Shane Brennan	16 October 1997
11	11	"Dance ‘Till You Drop"	Robert Klenner	Bill Garner	23 October 1997
12	12	"‘Till Death Do Us Part"	Colin Budds	John Coulter	30 October 1997
13	13	"Blood Sport"	Colin Budds	Shane Brennan	6 November 1997
14	14	"Bitter Harvest"	Colin Budds	Craig Wilkins	13 November 1997

=== Season 2 (1998) ===
No. overall	No. in series	Title	Directed by	Written by	Original release date
15	1	"Days of Reckoning"	Robert Klenner	Shane Brennan	24 August 1998
16	2	"Days of Reckoning II"	Robert Klenner	Barbara Bishop	24 August 1998
17	3	"Shaking the Tree"	Ian Watson	Graham Hartley	31 August 1998
18	4	"The Gift of Life"	Ian Watson	Annie Fox	7 September 1998
19	5	"Sunday in the Country"	David Cameron	John Coulter	21 September 1998
20	6	"Body of Evidence"	David Cameron	Peter Hepworth	28 September 1998
21	7	"On Thin Ice"	Ian Watson	Tony McDonald	28 September 1998
22	8	"One Carless Moment"	Ian Watson	Michael Cove	5 October 1998
23	9	"Three’s a Crowd"	Mandy Smith	Annie Beach	26 October 1998
24	10	"Assumptions"	Mandy Smith	Deborah Sheldon	2 November 1998
25	11	"Into the Fire"	Ali Ali	Michaeley O'Brien	9 November 1998
26	12	"Flying Solo"	Ali Ali	Michael Joshua	16 November 1998
27	13	"Officers & Gentlemen"	Denny Lawrence	Shane Brennan	23 November 1998
28	14	"Watershed"	Denny Lawrence	Barbara Bishop	23 November 1998

== Home media ==
Title	Format	Ep #	Discs	Region 4 (Australia)	Special features	Distributors
State Coroner (Series 01)	DVD	14	4	28 June 2008 2020 (Re-Release)	None	Umbrella Entertainment Crawford Productions
State Coroner (Series 02)	DVD	14		N/A		

== See also ==
- List of Australian television series
