= Track Youth Theatre =

- Formation: 1980
- Type: Theatre group
- Location: Boroondara, Victoria, Australia
- Artistic director: Ed Bailey
- Notable members: Stephen Curry
- Website: Track Youth Theatre Homepage

Track Youth Theatre is an amateur youth theatre group, based in Boroondara, Victoria, Australia. The group was founded by Ed Bailey, who directed the productions from 1980–2013. Since 2013, productions have been directed by Melissa Dioguardi and Sophie Jevons.

The 2016 production marked the group's 50th production. Apart from, The Hobbit, in 1981, "Man of Steel", 1986, "Bats" 1987, "Sheerluck Holmes" 1988, "Sheik, Rattle and Roll" 1990 (the last four by Denver and Dorricot) and "Superheroes" by Peter Sala, all plays have been written by Ed Bailey.

== Recent productions ==
The 2017 Track Youth Theatre production was ‘Superheroes’, performed on the first and second of September 2017. 'Superheroes' was written by Peter Sala and directed by Sophie Jevons. This was the second time in Track Youth's history it was performed but with some updated script edits. The 2018 Track Youth Theatre production was "Oh What a Knight" written by Hayley Lawson-Smith with music and lyrics by Ed Bailey, and directed by Breanna Dioguardi. The 2019 Track Youth Theatre production was "High School Cinderella" performed 30 And 31 August. It was directed by Sophie Jevons. The 2020 Track Youth Theatre production was cancelled due to the COVID-19 pandemic. Instead, a production called "Once Upon a Pandemic" was recorded over Zoom. The 2021 Track Youth Theatre production was "The Magic Clock". It was supposed to be performed on 27 and 28 August, but was cancelled due to the COVID-19 pandemic. Instead, the show was performed online using Zoom on 28 August. In 2022, TYT returned to live theatre with "Pirates!", written by Ed Bailey and directed by Sophie Jevons. The 2023 Track Youth Theatre production was "Rumplestiltskin" written by Ed Bailey and directed by Sophie Jevons the 2024 Track Youth Theatre production will be "The Pot of Gold", it will be performed in late August

== History ==
Track Youth Theatre originated from the amateur theatre group Toorak Players in 1980, as the Toorak Players Children's Workshop. Its first performance was a production of Sleeping Beauty, which they performed at the Pumpkin Theatre in Richmond. Due to the growing size of the group, the following year it performed at Kew High School's Renaissance Theatre, where it has performed ever since. Due to the COVID-19 pandemic, Track Youth Theatre performed online in 2020 and 2021.

An earlier group called The Toorak Players Childrens Theatre was established 18/5/66 with a performance of The Crossroads. They became Childrens Arena Theatre in June 1968 and Arena Theatre in 1982.

== Previous shows ==
This list is not all-inclusive.

Title	Year
Ali Baba	2005
Plain Princess	2006
No West for the Wicked	2007
Pirates	2008
Superheroes	2009
Cleopatra	2010
Sleeping Beauty	2011
Ali Baba	2012
Pot of Gold	2013
Aladdin	2014
Rumpelstitskin	2015
No West for the Wicked	2016
Superheroes	2017
Oh What a Knight	2018
High School Cinderella	2019
Once Upon a Pandemic	2020
The Princess and the Clock	2021
Pirates	2022
Rumplestiltskin	2023
The Pot of Gold	2024
Midsummer Magic	2025
