= Tropfest =

Australian short film festival

- Location: Australia
- Founded: 1993
- Most recent: 2026
- Language: English
- Website: www.tropfest.com

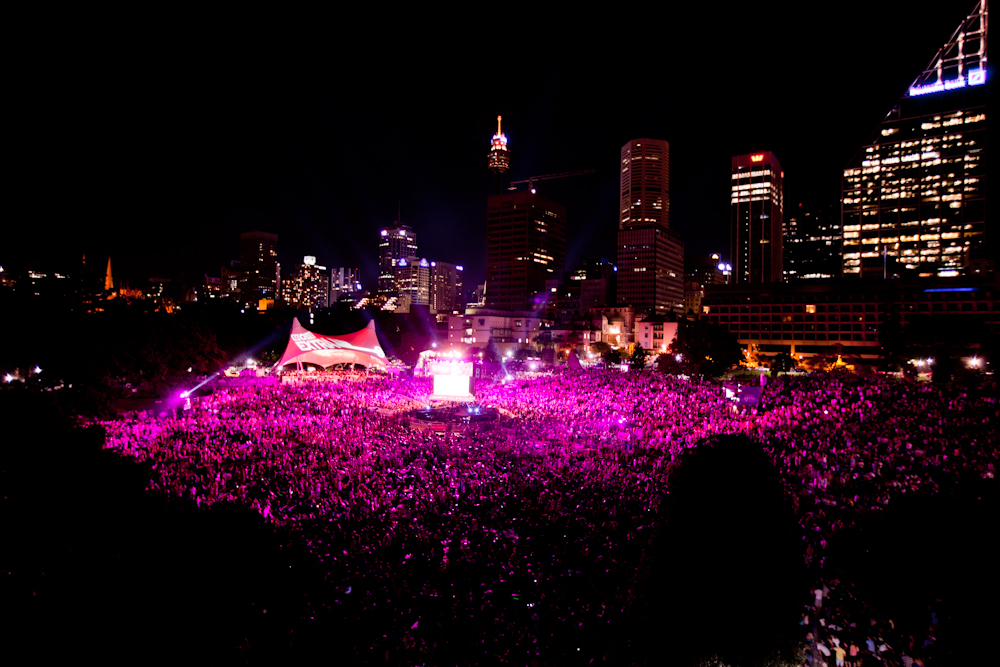
Tropfest in Sydney, February 2011

Tropfest, originally named Tropicana Short Film Festival, is an Australian short film festival held in Sydney. After being founded by actor/director John Polson in 1993, it became the largest platform for short films in the world. Lack of funding caused its cancellation in 2015, with the next festival taking place in Centennial Park in February 2016 after funding was sourced. The 2017 Tropfest was held in Parramatta Park. It went on hiatus after the 2019 event after experiencing financial difficulties, but returned in February 2026 at Centennial Park.

== History ==
=== Australia ===
The festival's name is derived from the first year's location—the Tropicana Caffe in Darlinghurst, an inner-eastern suburb of Sydney. It was established in 1993 by Australian-born filmmaker John Polson, who had originally, by arrangement with the proprietor of the Tropicana Caffe, screened his short film Surry Hills: 902 Spring Roll there, for an audience comprising cast, crew, and friends which grew to 200. In 1993, he oversaw the first "Tropicana Short Film Festival", which screened nine short films.

As it grew, it moved to a licence model, requiring sole rights to films screened at the festival. John Laverty set up the company Tropfest Festival Productions, which owned the film licences and managed the festival administration and finances. Polson looked after the creative elements, and promoted the festival.

In April 2007, Tropfest formed a partnership with PBL Media which would see festival content archived and screened across various PBL properties and brands.

By 2008, Tropfest had the backing and marketing power of the Sony Corporation. In its 16th edition that year, there were around 700 entries, with finalist films screened at venues in Sydney, Melbourne, Brisbane, Perth, Canberra, and Hobart, as well as some regional venues. They attracted an audience of more than 150,000 people.

For Tropfest 2009, pay television channel Movie Extra replaced Sony as the naming rights sponsor for the next seven years. A new feature in 2009 was the live national broadcast of Tropfest and screening of the finalist films on the Movie Extra channel.

In 2014, the organisers moved the festival from its usual month of February to December, hoping to reduce the chance of rainy weather. However, severe storms led to the evacuation of the festival site.

On 11 November 2015 Polson announced that the 2015 Sydney Tropfest had been cancelled. Polson said he had discovered that to his "surprise" Tropfest was facing a financial crisis and could not proceed due to a lack of funds. An outpouring of support for Tropfest quickly appeared over social media, including Twitter and Facebook, with calls for generous benefactors, state or federal government support, or crowd-funding.

On 6 December, the day that the 16 Tropfest finalist films were to have screened at Centennial Park, Polson announced that the Sydney festival would be held in its intended venue, Centennial Park, on 14 February 2016. CGU Insurance was the source of the necessary extra funding. In February 2016, Polson said that there had been "massive, massive financial mismanagement" by Tropfest managing director John Laverty, who had been managing the Vivid Sydney festival for several years, and had not responded to attempts to contact him. Polson also announced that they would be changing the festival licensing model, no longer asking for exclusive rights in perpetuity to the films screened at the festival. Mel Gibson was invited to be one of the 2016 Tropfest judges, "because he's an Australian icon", although the move attracted some criticism because of his recent racist, homophobic, and anti-Semitic comments.

In 2017, Mad Max filmmaker George Miller joined the Tropfest board.

The festival had a hiatus after the 2019 edition, owing to continuing financial troubles.

On 1 September 2025, it was announced that Tropfest would be returning after a six-year hiatus in February 2026, with the help of industry partners YouTube and Commonwealth Bank, with the Nine Network as a major broadcaster. Sarah Murdoch was appointed chairwoman of the new organisation, The Tropfest Foundation, with Peter V'landys and Bryan Brown on the board of directors. The February 2026 edition of Tropfest, held at Centennial Park on 22 February, attracted an audience of over 35,000 people. Margot Robbie was president of the jury.

=== International events ===
Tropfest expanded to locations around the world including Japan, Turkey, Africa, Abu Dhabi, London, Berlin, Toronto, Bangkok, and New York City.

The inaugural Tropfest Arabia, encompassing approximately 33 countries throughout the Middle East and North Africa, took place in Abu Dhabi in November 2011. Tropfest New Zealand launched in 2013 and Tropfest South East Asia at Penang, Malaysia, in 2014.

Tropfest had held annual New York screenings between 2006 and 2008, but officially launched into the United States in June 2012, with a weekend-long event in Las Vegas. Over a weekend in June 2012, The Cosmopolitan in Las Vegas celebrated Tropfest's 20th anniversary, culminating in a screening of the best 16 films from the past two decades in the Tropfest All Star Competition. A few weeks later, on 23 June 2012, Tropfest New York had its debut in Bryant Park. Tropfest NY 2013 festival was held on 22 June in Brooklyn's Prospect Park, with a bridge as the signature item.

== Description ==
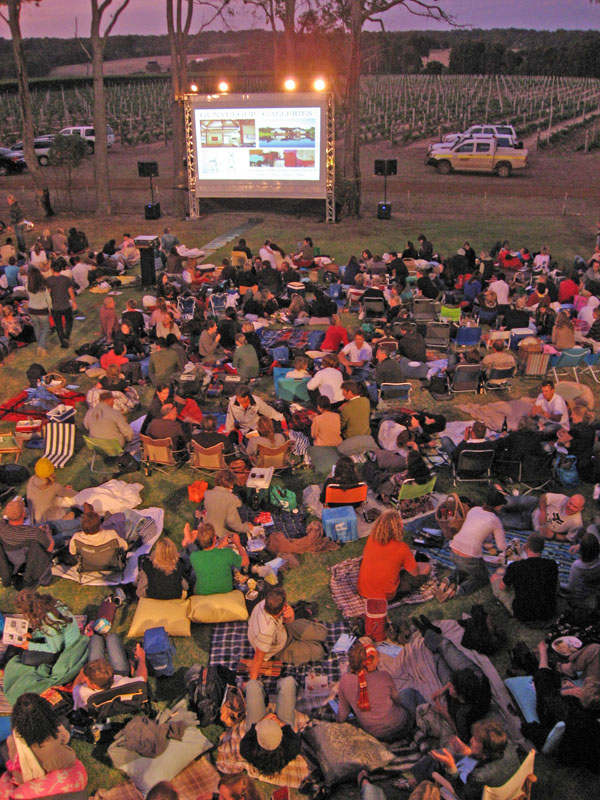
Tropfest 2009 at MadFish Winery Margaret River, Western Australia

Tropfest lays claim to being "the world's largest short film festival". Filmmakers, who come from all walks of life and all ages, are required to create new works for the festival which can be on any topic, but must include an item, known as the "Tropfest Signature Item" which changes each year. At least until 2015, founder-organiser Polson selected the finalists himself.

Tropfest programs have included:

- Trop Jr, a short filmmaking competition and festival for youngsters under 16
- APRA TROPSCORE, a film scoring and synching competition
- Nikon DSLR Film Category, a category in the competition awarding short films created using DSLR technology
- Holden 7 second Challenge, a 7-second film competition

The biggest-ever edition attracted an audience of 200,000, was broadcast on SBS2, and had a separate junior competition as well as several spin-off festivals around the world. It was the world's largest short film festival, and an important competition and showcase for young filmmakers. Baz Luhrmann described it as "the film equivalent of a stadium rock concert".

Before 2016, all entrants, who paid a fee of $45, had to surrender their rights to their films to the festival. This changed with the 2016 festival. It also changed from being a for-profit enterprise to a not-for-profit in that year. It remains NFP as of 2026.

In 2026, the competition offered the following prizes, provided by the CommBank Emerging Filmmakers Fund:

- 1st Prize: $50,000
- 2nd Prize: $30,000
- 3rd Prize: $20,000

== Locations and broadcast in Australia ==
The main event from 1993 to 2016 took place in Sydney but live satellite events have also been staged in Melbourne, Canberra, Brisbane, Adelaide, Hobart, Perth, and other cities. The event has been broadcast live on television by ABC Comedy, Movie Network, SBS and other networks and webcast to viewers around Australia and the world. In August 2016 it was announced that, beginning in February 2017, the venue would be moved to Parramatta in western Sydney.

In February 2013 festival founder John Polson announced a change of venue from the Domain to Centennial Park.

The 2026 edition was livestreamed on YouTube.

== Tropfest finalists and legacy ==
Patrick Hughes, whose film Lighter won in 2001, has gone on to direct numerous Hollywood movies, including War Machine, The Hitman's Bodyguard, and The Expendables 3.

Abe Forsythe, who won in 2010 (with Shock) and finished second in 2009 (with Being Carl Williams), directed the feature films Ned, Down Under, and Little Monsters, and the TV series Wolf Like Me.

Emma Freeman, who won in 2002 with Lamb, has gone on to direct on TV, including episodes of Love My Way, Offspring, Puberty Blues, The Secret Life of Us and Glitch.

Damon Gameau won Tropfest 2011 for Animal Beatbox, going on to make a name for himself with That Sugar Film and others.

Matt Bird's films reached the Tropfest finals in 2011 (A Desperate Deed), 2012 (Min Min), and 2013 (Taser) In 2012 he directed The Exchange, which was commissioned by Tropfest and APRA AMCOS for the 2013 Tropscore competition. He also founded the creative collective Chesterfilm.

Michael Noonan holds the record for the most Tropfest finalist selections, with seven. He made the finals with Applause (2006), Counter (2007), Photo Booth (2012), Remote (2013), Evil Mexican Child (2014), Accomplice (2017) and Notes to Salma (2019)

The NFSA holds copies of many Tropfest entries, as well as documents and artefacts related to Tropfest, for example, in 2001, entry guidelines; a VIP invitation; festival program; posters; a sponsorship and promotional prospectus as well as the trailer titled The Pitch, featuring a young Rose Byrne and Joel Edgerton.

== Signature item ==
Each year, Tropfest requires that entries include a particular "signature item" or action to ensure that they are unique and are made specifically for the festival. No TSI was required for the 1993 festival. The following are TSIs by year:

- 2026 – Hourglass
- 2019 – Candle
- 2018 – Rose
- 2017 – Pineapple
- 2016 – Card
- 2014 – Mirror
- 2013, December – Change
- 2013, February – Balloon
- 2012 – Lightbulb
- 2011 – Key
- 2010 – Dice
- 2009 – Spring
- 2008 – The Number 8
- 2007 – Sneeze
- 2006 – Bubble
- 2005 – Umbrella
- 2004 – Hook
- 2003 – Rock
- 2002 – Match
- 2001 – Horn
- 2000 – Bug
- 1999 – Chopsticks
- 1998 – Kiss
- 1997 – Pickle
- 1996 – Teaspoon
- 1995 – Coffee Bean
- 1994 – Muffin
- 1993 – None

== Controversy and criticism ==
Between 2008 and 2013, three of the six winning films were accused of plagiarism.

The winner of the December 2013 festival, Bamboozled, was accused of homophobia and transphobia. It is a comedy in which the punchline "involved people pointing and laughing at a man for sleeping with somebody he believed was transgender". Polson said a few years later: "We're not perfect. I know [with] that film, if we had our time again it might have gone down very differently".

In 2026, the festival was criticised for selecting SYD CONFIDENTIAL, an AI-generated film as one of its sixteen finalists. Polson asserted that the film complied with the festival's rules.

According to Guardian Australia and Daily Review film critic Luke Buckmaster in 2015, "By generally selecting one or two cheap-as-chips films every year for the 16 finalists, Polson aided the illusion the event was a grassroots style festival when it largely served spit-polished films made by well-resourced parties", at that time going on to hold exclusive licences for the films in perpetuity. Buckmaster also wrote that the festival chose "vanilla-flavoured selections palatable for mass consumption".

== See also ==
- 2006 Tropfest finalists
- 2007 Tropfest finalists
