= Fiona Choi =

Australian actor

- Born: Melbourne, Australia
- Education: Monash University (BComm); Edith Cowan University (BA)
- Occupations: Actor, voice actor
- Website: Official website

Fiona Choi is an Australian actress, singer and stage performer, best known for her lead role as Jenny Law in Benjamin Law's award-winning SBS Comedy The Family Law for which she received an AACTA Award nomination for Best Performance in a Television Comedy and 3 consecutive Equity Ensemble Awards for Outstanding Performance in a Comedy Series. Fiona is also known for her work on stage in Melbourne Theatre Company's Golden Shield and Torch The Place as well as her one-woman show Dragon Lady: The Many Lives & Deaths of Anna May Wong which premiered to much acclaim at the 2019 Adelaide Cabaret Festival

== Early life ==
Fiona Choi was born in Melbourne, Australia to Chinese immigrant parents. She began acting as a child, appearing in musical roles including Nicky in Sweet Charity, Chiffon in Little Shop of Horrors, Squeaky Fromme in Assassins and Eva Peron in Evita. She graduated from Monash University with a Bachelor of Commerce, but did this primarily to please her parents. After this she moved to Perth for a Bachelor of Arts in musical theatre at the Western Australian Academy of Performing Arts at Edith Cowan University.

== Career ==
Upon graduation Choi was cast in the original Australian company of Rent. Her other Australian theater credits include Metamorpheses, directed by Mary Zimmerman, for the MTC, and Mamma Mia!, directed by Phyllida Lloyd. Choi had a two-month guest arc as Laura Wallace on the Australian show Neighbours.

Choi moved to New York in 2003 to continue her acting career. Her film and TV credits include: Homeland, Law & Order: Criminal Intent, Person Of Interest, New Year's Eve, Unforgettable and The Newsroom.

She was involved in the development of the musicals Apathy: A Gen X Musical and FAMBAM360.

In 2015, Choi returned to Australia to star as Jenny Law in The Family Law. Produced by Matchbox Pictures and airing on SBS in Australia. The Family Law was nominated for a 2016 AACTA Award for best comedy. Choi was nominated for an AACTA Award for Best Performance In A Television Comedy. Season 2 aired on SBS in 2017 and season 3 followed in 2019. All 3 seasons of The Family Law earned its cast an Equity Ensemble Award for Outstanding Performance in a Comedy Series.

Fiona played Cindy Nguyen in all 3 seasons of Mustangs FC and has guest-starred in The Letdown, Wentworth, Utopia, True Story with Hamish & Andy, My Life is Murder and Harrow.

Choi has also worked as casting director for the North American musical tours of Scooby-Doo Live! Musical Mysteries and Chuggington. She has also cast talent for assorted on-air promo campaigns.

In 2019, Choi performed in Golden Shield for Melbourne Theatre Company, followed by Torch The Place in 2020 which had a truncated season due to the coronavirus disease 2019.

Choi in 2023 appeared in ABC series Australian Epic. Choi was then announced and appeared in the Stan Australia series Population 11 and also appeared in three episodes of White Fever.

== Filmography ==
=== Television ===
Year	Title	Role	Notes
2025	Watching You	Rose	5 episodes
2024	Buried	Hiker Jane	1 episode (1.1)
2024	White Fever	Becky	3 episodes
2024	Population 11	Charmaine Ling	TV Series
2023	Australian Epic	Various	6 episodes
2022	Surviving Summer	Amelia Cross	1 episode
2020-21	Wentworth	Andrea Casey	2 episodes
2017-20	Mustangs FC	Cindy	13 episodes
2019	Secret Bridesmaids' Business	Dr. Elise Reardon	4 episodes
2019	Utopia	Lucy	1 episode
2019	My Life Is Murder	Mrs Zhang	1 episode
2017-19	The Letdown	Belle	3 episodes
2019	Get Krack!n	Nancy Lee	1 episode
2016-19	The Family Law	Jenny Law	18 episodes
2018	Back In Very Small Business	Sarina	1 episode
2018	Harrow (TV series)	Anita Durete	1 episode
2017	Sisters	Dr Tan	1 episode
2017	True Story with Hamish & Andy	Sophie	1 episode
2015	Person of Interest	Samaritan Tech	1 episode
2014	Taxi Brooklyn	Desk Sergeant	1 episode
2014	Unforgettable	Camryn	1 episode
2013	Fortune Sun	Jae Lee	TV Series
2013	Alpha House	Reporter	1 episode
2013	Homeland (TV series)	Reporter	1 episode
2013	The Newsroom	ACN Reporter	1 episode
2011	A Gifted Man	Tessa	1 episode
2011	The Big C	Stroller Mom #1	1 episode
2011	Too Big to Fail	Second Reporter	TV Movie
2011	Blue Bloods	Teach	1 episode
2005	Law & Order: Criminal Intent	Lisa	1 episode
2001	Neighbours	Laura	7 episodes
1995	Blue Heelers	Lucy Chen	1 episode

=== Film/Shorts ===
Year	Title	Role	Notes	Ref
2023	Parental Guidance	Tracy	Short	
2023	Jones Family Christmas	Dot		
2022	Assets	Alpha	Short	
2021	Share Screen	Ella	Short	
2011	New Years Eve	Balinese Woman		
2011	Smoking Nonsmoking	Wang		
2009	The Pack	Katie Wang		
1999	Shooting Blanks	Kiki		
	Penzai	Jing Xiao	Short	

== Stage ==
Choi has performed in numerous stage performances. In 2022 she appeared in Into The Woods. In 2024, Choi appeared in the play Seventeen alongside Pamela Rabe and Richard Piper.

Year	Title	Role	Notes	Ref
2024	Seventeen	Lizzy	MTC	
2022	Single Asian Female	Pearl		
2022	Laurinda	Katie	MTC	
2022	Into The Woods	Baker's Wife		
2020	Torch The Place		MTC	
2019	Golden Shield	Julie Chen	MTC	
2019	Dragon Lady	Anna May Wong	Adelaide Cabaret	
2003	Metamorphoses	Various	MTC	
2001	Mamma Mia	Understudy		
