= Girl Asleep =

Girl Asleep may refer to:

- Girl Asleep (film), a 2015 Australian drama film
- A Girl Asleep, a 1657 painting by Johannes Vermeer
