= Mike Bishop (actor) =

Australian actor

- Born: Ringwood, Victoria, Australia
- Occupation: Actor
- Years active: 1981–present
- Children: Gemma Bishop

Mike Bishop, also credited as Michael Bishop, is an Australian actor, director and drama coach.

== Career ==
Bishop's television appearances include recurring roles in cult prison series Prisoner playing Harry Grosvenor (1986), R.F.D.S. playing Evelyn Whaley (1993–1994) and Something in the Air as Sergeant Geoff Collins / Clive (2000–2001). He also featured in long-running soap opera Neighbours in 1996, in which he played the recurring guest role of Mick Anderson. He later worked as a drama coach on the series from 2005 to 2008.

He portrayed Uncle Dan in the second and third miniseries of Fields of Fire, in 1988 and 1989 respectively. In 1990, he appeared in the second miniseries of All the Rivers Run, based on the 1958 Australian novel of the same name by Nancy Cato. He also appeared in the 1992 political miniseries Bastard Boys as Peter Reith. He later played English cricketer Doug Insole in the 2012 miniseries Howzat! Kerry Packer's War.

Additionally, Bishop has made guest appearances in numerous television series including Cop Shop, Carson's Law, The Henderson Kids, The Flying Doctors, Col'n Carpenter, All Together Now, Boys from the Bush, Acropolis Now, Law of the Land, Snowy, Blue Heelers, Good Guys, Bad Guys, Stingers, City Homicide, the first season of Underbelly, Killing Time, The Doctor Blake Mysteries, Fat Tony & Co. and Wentworth.

Bishop's film credits include 1985 comedy Malcolm, and 1987 action thriller Ground Zero (alongside Colin Friels in both), and 1992 film A Slow Night at the Kuwaiti Cafe. For his performance in the 1988 prison drama-suspense film Ghosts… of the Civil Dead, he was nominated for the 1989 Australian Film Institute Award for Best Actor in a Leading Role.

His other film credits include medical comedy drama The Clinic (1982), Ozploitation film Future Schlock (1984), thriller Dead Sleep (1990) opposite Linda Blair, comedy A Kink in the Picasso (1990), gritty drama thriller Metal Skin (1994) alongside Ben Mendelsohn and Aden Young, and River Street (1996) opposite Bill Hunter, Essie Davis and Aden Young. He also appeared in several made-for-tv movies and short films.

Bishop has also worked extensively in theatre since 1982. He appeared in a touring production of The Hobbit puppet show as Gandalf in 1997, Dirty Dancing as Max Kellerman from 2014 to 2015, and Singin' in the Rain as R.F. Simpson in 2016. His most recent stage credit was Harry Potter and the Cursed Child at Melbourne's Princess Theatre, in which he was part of the original cast from 2019 to 2022.

Bishop directed Dr. Cade at La Mama in Melbourne as part of the 2002 Melbourne Fringe Festival, before it moved to Beckett Theatre, and then Sydney's Stables Theatre in 2003. His other stage credits as director include a 1993 touring production of The Wind in the Willows with the Australian Shakespeare Company, a 1996 Melbourne production of Snow White and Little Red Riding Hood at Melbourne Concert Hall and a 2009 Melbourne production of The Show Must Go On with La Mama.

== Filmography ==
=== Film ===
Year	Title	Role	Notes
1982	The Clinic		
1984	Future Schlock	Bear	
1985	Malcolm	Armed Guard	
1987	Ground Zero	TV News Cameraman	
1988	Ghosts… of the Civil Dead	David Yale	
1990	Breakaway	De Silva	
1990	Dead Sleep	Policeman	
1990	A Kink in the Picasso	Tony	
1992	A Slow Night at the Kuwaiti Cafe		
1992	Aftermath: Restoring the Workplace		Short film
1994	Metal Skin	Dazey's father	
1995	Sticktoitiveness		Short film
1996	River Street	Constable Mark Rogers	
1999	Dead End	Interview Room Police	
2009	Remembering Nigel	Michael Bishop	
2011	Talkback	Bill Pointer – The Virus	Short film
2012	Planes	Malachi	Short film
2013	Hard Cases	The Judge	Short film
2015	I Am Evangeline	Mr Black	
2018	Hoarder Control	Rob	Short film
2018	Bloody Christmas	Prime Minister Desmond Humphrey	
2024	Good Neighbour	David	Short film
2025	Average Bloke	Terrie Jones	

=== Television ===
Year	Title	Role	Notes
1981	Cop Shop	Ben Higgins	1 episode
1983–1984	Carson's Law	Defence Counsel / Williams / Const. Reg Lewis / Frederick Walsh	4 episodes
1984	Every Move She Makes	Bob	TV movie
1985	The Henderson Kids	Desk Clerk	2 episodes
1986	Prisoner	Harry Grosvenor	11 episodes
1988	Fields of Fire II	Uncle Dan	Miniseries, 1 episode
1989	Fields of Fire III	Uncle Dan	Miniseries, 1 episode
1989–1991	The Flying Doctors	Harold Jacobs / Charlie	2 episodes
1990	Col'n Carpenter	Brian	1 episode
1990	All the Rivers Run II	Grainger	Miniseries, 2 episodes
1991	All Together Now	Mr Reid	1 episode
1991	Boys from the Bush	Bruce	1 episode
1992	Acropolis Now	Kevin	1 episode
1992	The Aftermath		TV movie
1993	Law of the Land	Ray Richmond	1 episode
1993	Snowy	Les Tremain	4 episodes
1993	Mercy Mission: The Rescue of Flight 771	First Officer Russ Mann	TV movie
1993–1994	R.F.D.S.	Evelyn Whaley	7 episodes
1994–2006	Blue Heelers	Mick Pearce O'Connor / Davies Davidson / Charles Fenwick	3 episodes
1996	Neighbours	Mick Anderson	5 episodes
1997	Good Guys, Bad Guys	Frank Little	1 episode
1997	Get a Life	Ken Fleiss	
1998	Driven Crazy	Tom	1 episode
1998	Blabbermouth & Stickybeak	Kenny Batts	TV movie
2000	Stingers	Simon Hall	1 episode
2000–2001	Something in the Air	Sgt. Geoff Collins / Clive	9 episodes
2002	Short Cuts	Sophie's Dad	1 episode
2007	Bastard Boys	Peter Reith	Miniseries
2007	City Homicide	David Statesman	1 episode
2008	Underbelly	Detective Lowe	Miniseries, 1 episode
2011	Killing Time	Judge Colti	1 episode
2012	Howzat! Kerry Packer's War	Doug Insole	Miniseries, 2 episodes
2013	The Doctor Blake Mysteries	Charles Griffith	1 episode
2014	Fat Tony & Co.	Judge / Justice Gillard	Miniseries, 2 episodes
2015	Wentworth	Roland Henderson	1 episode

== Theatre ==
=== As actor ===
Year	Title	Role	Notes
1981	Nightshift	Musician in Residence	Rusden State College, Melbourne
1982	Skids		Melbourne Comedy Cafe
1984	Odyssey of a Prostitute	Count Coolgardie / Henri Suave / Zeek / Judge	Church Theatre, Melbourne with Australian Contemporary Theatre Company
1984	Unsuitable for Adults		Studio Theatre, Melbourne with Playbox Theatre Company
1985	Cyrano de Bergerac	Bellerose / Gascon Cadet	Playhouse, Melbourne with MTC
1985	Victoria Bitter	Lord Melbourne / Chairman / Judge / Gossip / Narrator / Palmer / Dying Man / George / Alastair the Thug / Masters of Ceremonies	Playhouse, Melbourne with MTC
1985	The Sentimental Bloke	Ginger Mick	Playhouse, Melbourne with MTC
1986	Nothing Like a Dame		Kinselas, Sydney
1987–1988	Sweeney Todd	Birdseller	Playhouse, Melbourne, Riverstage, Brisbane, Her Majesty's Theatre, Sydney with MTC
1988	Summer of the Seventeenth Doll	Roo	Australian Nouveau Theatre, Melbourne, Singapore
1988	Molière	One Eye	Key Studios, Melbourne with Australian Nouveau Theatre for Spoleto Melbourne Festival of the Arts
1989	Joan of Arc at the Stake		Melbourne Concert Hall with MTC & Victorian State Opera
1989; 1991	A Royal Commission into the Australian Economy		Police Auditorium, Melbourne, Universal Theatre, Melbourne for MICF
1990	Siren	Paul	Melbourne Athenaeum, Lyric Theatre, Brisbane, Canberra Theatre with Australian Shakespeare Company
1990	Alice's Adventures in Wonderland	Dodo / Caterpillar / March Hare	Werribee Mansion Gardens with Australian Shakespeare Company
1990	A Hard Act to Follow		MICF
1990	The Adman	Eric Sterling	Playbox Theatre, Melbourne
1991	The Gigolo from the Congo		La Mama, Melbourne, Universal Two, Melbourne
1992	Naso Bello	Naso Bruto	Victorian Arts Centre
1992–1993	Twelfth Night	Malvolio	Adelaide Botanic Garden, Royal Botanic Gardens Melbourne, Adelaide Festival of Arts with Australian Shakespeare Company
1993–1995	Blabbermouth	Kenny Batts	Russell Street Theatre, Melbourne with MTC
1994	Amadeus	Von Strack / Citizen of Vienna / Salieri understudy	Melbourne Athenaeum with Griffin Entertainment
1995	Good Works	Brother Clement / Barry / Alan / Mr Donovan	Malthouse Theatre, Melbourne, Monash University, Melbourne with Playbox Theatre Company
1996	Snow White & the Seven Dwarfs	The Jockey	Melbourne Concert Hall with Magpie Theatre Company
1996	Red Riding Hood	The Wolf	Melbourne Concert Hall with Magpie Theatre Company
1997	The Hobbit	Gandalf	Canberra Theatre, Sydney Opera House, Victorian Arts Centre, Monash University, Melbourne
1998	Bodysongs – the Fatman tour	The Fatman	Theatre Works, Melbourne
1998–1999	Much Ado About Nothing	Antonio / Friar	EHJ Productions
2000	The Dam		Carlton Courthouse, Melbourne
2000	Wind in the Willows	Badger	
2001	Romeo and Juliet	Capulet	
2001	Go in Tight	Dickins	La Mama, Melbourne
2002	Twelfth Night	Malvolio	Royal Botanic Gardens Melbourne with Australian Shakespeare Company
2003	Dirty Laundry	Lenny	Carlton Courthouse, Melbourne with La Mama
2004	The Campaign	Michael Murphy	Carlton Courthouse, Melbourne with La Mama, Melbourne with MICF
2005	The Trial of Adolf Eichmann	General Heydrich	Courthouse Theatre, Melbourne
2006	Dizney on Dry Ice	Ned	Carlton Courthouse, Melbourne with La Mama for MICF
2006	Mrs Petrov's Shoe	Various characters	Fortyfivedownstairs, Melbourne with theatre@risk
2006	The Reunion	The Admiral	
2007	Sideshow Alley	Tiny McKenzie	Playhouse, Brisbane
2008	Richard III Unhinged	Hastings	Melbourne Athenaeum with Australian Shakespeare Company
2008	The Dinner		Fairfax Studio, Melbourne for Short+Sweet
2009	AvaTära – The Opera		Space 28, Melbourne with Malthouse Theatre & The Opera Project
2010	Lawyers, Drugs and Money	Alan Clowes	Carlton Courthouse, Melbourne with La Mama for MICF
2010	MelBorn		Carlton Courthouse, Melbourne with La Mama & Melbourne Writers' Theatre
2010	Love Your Poison	Mick	Carlton Courthouse, Melbourne with La Mama & Melbourne Writers' Theatre
2010	Squizzy		Trades Hall, Melbourne with Australian Shakespeare Company & Think Big Productions
2011	Kismet	Jawan, the Master Brigand	State Theatre, Melbourne with The Production Company & The Arts Centre
2014	Guys and Dolls	Big Jule	State Theatre, Melbourne with The Production Company & The Arts Centre
2014–2015	Dirty Dancing: The Classic Story on Stage	Max Kellerman	Sydney Lyric Theatre, Princess Theatre, Melbourne, Lyric Theatre, Brisbane, Crown Theatre, Perth, Adelaide Festival Centre with The Gordon Frost Organisation
2016	Singin' in the Rain	R.F. Simpson	Her Majesty's Theatre, Melbourne, Sydney Lyric Theatre, Lyric Theatre, Brisbane
2019–2022	Harry Potter and the Cursed Child	Understudy for Amos Diggory, Albus Dumbledore, Severus Snape, Vernon Dursley and Tom Riddle	Princess Theatre, Melbourne

=== As director ===
Year	Title	Role	Notes
1982	Hoopla – Opposite Waves	Director	Rusden State College, Melbourne
1983	Hell on Earth	Director	Rusden State College, Melbourne
1984	Good Things Come in Glass	Supervisor	Rusden State College, Melbourne
1992	Lillian	Director / Playwright	USQ Concert Hall, Toowoomba
1993	The Wind in the Willows	Director	Royal Botanic Garden, Sydney, Royal Botanic Gardens Melbourne with Australian Shakespeare Company
1994	See You in Heaven	Director	Carlton Courthouse, Melbourne with Chiron Productions
1995	A Midsummer Night's Dream	Director	Adelaide Botanic Garden with Australian Shakespeare Company
1996	From Figaro to Phantom II	Consultant	Melbourne Town Hall for MICF
1996	Figaro! Figaro! Figaro!	Director / Dramaturge	Monash University, Melbourne & VIC regional tour
1996	Snow White and Little Red Riding Hood	Director	Melbourne Concert Hall with Magpie Theatre Company
2002–2003	Dr. Cade	Director	La Mama, Melbourne for Melbourne Fringe Festival, Beckett Theatre, Melbourne, Stables Theatre, Sydney
2004	Personality Games	Director	Wharf Theatre, Sydney, La Mama, Melbourne
2007	Topo	Director	Seymour Centre, Sydney
2007	The Devil in Me	Director	Carlton Courthouse, Melbourne with La Mama
2009	The Show Must Go On	Director	Carlton Courthouse, Melbourne with La Mama
