= Gemma Bishop =

Australian actress and singer-songwriter

- Occupations: Actress; singer; songwriter
- Years active: 1991–present
- Notable work: Short Cuts (2002); Neighbours (2003); The Cheerleader Diaries (2013)
- Children: 2
- Family: Mike Bishop (father)

Gemma Bishop is an actress and singer-songwriter from Australia.

== Career ==
Bishop's acting career began at the age of eight with a guest appearance on The Flying Doctors. Since then, she has appeared in regular roles as Sophie Bennett in Short Cuts (2002), Kat Riley in Neighbours (2003) and Casey Simmons in The Cheerleader Diaries (2013).

She has had guest roles in The Flying Doctors, Law of the Land, Good Guys, Bad Guys, Blue Heelers, State Coroner, Halifax f.p., City Homicide, Matchmakers, Duck World, and WTF 101.

She has also appeared in several films and short films.

Bishop has appeared on stage in a number of productions including Romeo and Juliet (as Juliet), A Midsummer Night’s Dream (as Hermia), Twelfth Night (as Viola) and Alice in Wonderland (as Alice) with the Australian Shakespeare Company. She has also worked for Melbourne's La Mama Theatre, appearing in Dr Cade and The Show Must Go On, both directed by her father Mike Bishop.

As a singer and songwriter, Bishop was nominated for two LA Music Awards, including 'Best Female Singer/Songwriter' and 'Best Adult Contemporary Single of the Year' for her single "Midnight" in 2014.

Bishop is also a counsellor specialising in grief and loss counselling, as well as an accredited birth doula.

== Personal life ==
Bishop's father is Australian actor Mike Bishop.

Bishop has a son Brooks and a daughter Vivienne together with her husband Noah. She has been open about her struggles with grief around loss, having suffered a miscarriage on three occasions.

== Filmography ==
=== Film ===
Year	Title	Role	Notes
2009	Sex Defence	Jodee	Short film
2012	Victory Blvd		
2012	Olive	Mother	Short film
2014	Groomless Bride	Lynn	
2015	Our New Nanny	Female News Anchor	
2022	Unreported	Lucy	

=== Television ===
Year	Title	Role	Notes
1991	The Flying Doctors	Fiona Murphy	1 episode
1994	Law of the Land	Gabby Richmond	1 episode
1997	Good Guys, Bad Guys	Laura	1 episode
1997	Blue Heelers	Kylie Bunton	2 episodes
1997	State Coroner	Megan Bennett	1 episode
2000	Halifax f.p.	Samantha Anderson	1 episode
2002	Short Cuts	Sophie Bennett	26 episodes
2003	Neighbours	Kat Riley	6 episodes
2007	City Homicide	Caroline Joyner	1 episode
2012	Matchmakers	LesbiAnne Warren	1 episode
2012	Soap in the City	Diva	TV movie
2013	The Cheerleader Diaries	Casey Simmons	10 episodes
2017	Duck World	Kelly	2 episodes
2019	WTF 101	Countess Anastasia	1 episode

== Theatre ==
Year	Title	Role	Notes
	Romeo and Juliet	Juliet	
1992	The Wind in the Willows		Royal Botanic Gardens Melbourne with Australian Shakespeare Company
2002–2003	Dr. Cade	Mary	La Mama, Melbourne, Malthouse Theatre, Melbourne, Stables Theatre, Sydney
2005	Twelfth Night	Viola	Royal Botanic Gardens Melbourne with Australian Shakespeare Company
2006	A Midsummer Night's Dream	Hermia	Royal Botanic Gardens Melbourne with Australian Shakespeare Company
2007	The Devil in Me		Carlton Courthouse, Melbourne with La Mama
2007	The Wind in the Willows		Royal Botanic Gardens Melbourne with Australian Shakespeare Company
2008	The Taming of the Shrew	Bianca	Royal Botanic Gardens Melbourne with Australian Shakespeare Company
2009	The Show Must Go On		Carlton Courthouse, Melbourne with La Mama
2011	Alice in Wonderland	Alice	Rippon Lea Estate with Australian Shakespeare Company, Duneira, Mount Macedon
