= My First Summer =

- Directed by: Katie Found
- Written by: Katie Found
- Starring: Markella Kavenagh; Maiah Stewardson
- Cinematography: Matthew Chuang
- Edited by: Annabelle Johnson
- Music by: Kyle Morton
- Production companies: Noise & Light
- Distributed by: Peccadillo Pictures
- Release date: 2020
- Running time: 77 minutes
- Country: Australia
- Language: English

My First Summer is a 2020 Australian coming-of-age film written and directed by Katie Found. It stars Markella Kavenagh and Maiah Stewardson.

== Plot ==
16 year-old Grace is interviewed by police detectives after witnessing a woman drown in a reservoir. Despite seeing another girl near the scene, Grace claims that she was the only witness. She tracks down the other girl, Claudia, to her home, and, after a tense confrontation, learns that she is the daughter of the drowned woman—a depressed, reclusive writer named Veronica Fox—and that she was too terrified to commit suicide with her mother.

Grace resolves to help Claudia through her trauma and introduce her to things from the outside world, including candy and strawberry milk. Though Grace is unhappy living with her mother and argumentative step-father, she returns home between her visits with Claudia. During one of her absences, the police inspect Claudia's house as part of their investigation into her mother's death. They discover Claudia's dog, Tilly, and take her with them as Claudia hides. On her way to Claudia, Grace encounters the police and claims that Tilly is hers in order to return her to Claudia.

Grace and Claudia's friendship turns romantic, and they spend the night together. In the morning, Grace leaves to purchase more strawberry milk. Upon arriving home, she discovers the police waiting with her parents, who revealed that Grace does not own a dog. Grace reluctantly accompanies the police to find Claudia, who is not allowed to live alone without a legal guardian. When Claudia sees that the police have arrived, she flees and attempts to drown herself in the reservoir. Grace runs after her and pulls her from the water.

== Cast ==
- Markella Kavenagh as Claudia
- Maiah Stewardson as Grace
- Edwina Wren as Veronica Fox
- Steve Mouzakis as Detective Croydon
- Harvey Zielinski as Detective Jones
- Katherine Tonkin as Donna
- Arthur Angel as Mike

== Production ==
My First Summer is Found's debut feature film. It was filmed in rural Victoria, near Castlemaine.

== Themes ==
My First Summer is a queer coming-of-age film, though it focuses on the characters' love story rather than coming out or explicitly discussing sexuality.

== Release ==
My First Summer premiered at the Adelaide Film Festival in 2020. It was released as part of the BFI Flare: London LGBTIQ+ Film Festival online in March 2021.

== Awards and nominations ==
| Year | Award | Category | Result | Ref. |
|---|---|---|---|---|
| 2021 | Australian Academy of Cinema and Television Arts Awards | Best Indie Film | Nominated | |
