= Marc Gracie =

Australian writer, producer, and director

Marc Gracie is an Australian writer, producer and director of films and television, best known for his work in the comedy field.

In 2009 he won the 2009 Melbourne Underground Film Festival Best Director award for The Tumbler.

He directed the original Wogs Out of Work stage production.

- Blowing Hot and Cold (1988) – director
- Jigsaw (1990) – director, writer
- A Kink in the Picasso (1990) – director
- A Slow Night at the Kuwaiti Cafe (1992) – director, writer
- Crimetime (1993) – director
- Full Frontal (1994) (TV series) – director, writer
- Jimeoin (1994) (TV series) – associate producer, director
- Eat My Shorts (1995) (TV series) – producer
- The Adventures of Lano & Woodley (1997)(TV producer) – producer
- Totally Full Frontal (1998–99) (TV series) – executive producer, director, writer
- The Craic (1999) – producer
- Sit Down, Shut Up (2001) (TV series) – producer, director
- Jimeoin's Teatowel Tours: Northern Ireland (2001) (documentary) – producer, director
- Shock Jock (2001–02) (TV series) – producer, director
- Take Away (2003) – producer, director
- You and Your Stupid Mate (2005) – producer, director
- The Tumbler (2008) – producer, director, story
- This is Your Laugh (2008) (TV series) – producer
- With Tim Ferguson (2010) (TV series) – producer, director
- Spin Out (2016) – producer, co-director
