= A Kink in the Picasso =

- Based on: an idea by Will Spencer
- Written by: Hugh Stuckey
- Directed by: Marc Gracie
- Starring: Mark Bishop; Jane Clifton
- Music by: Frank Strangio
- Country of origin: Australia
- Original language: English

Production
- Executive producer: Rosa Colosimo
- Producer: Will Spencer
- Cinematography: James Grant
- Running time: 86 mins
- Production company: Rosa Colosimo Films

Original release
- Release: 1990

A Kink in the Picasso is a 1990 Australian film directed by Marc Gracie and written by Hugh Stuckey. It was filmed in Melbourne from October to November 1989.

== Cast ==
- Mike Bishop as Tony
- Jane Clifton as Bella
- Peter Hosking as Minister
- Tiriel Mora as Stan
- Jon Finlayson as Lionel
- Louise Siversen as Reporter
