= Louise Siversen =

Australian actress

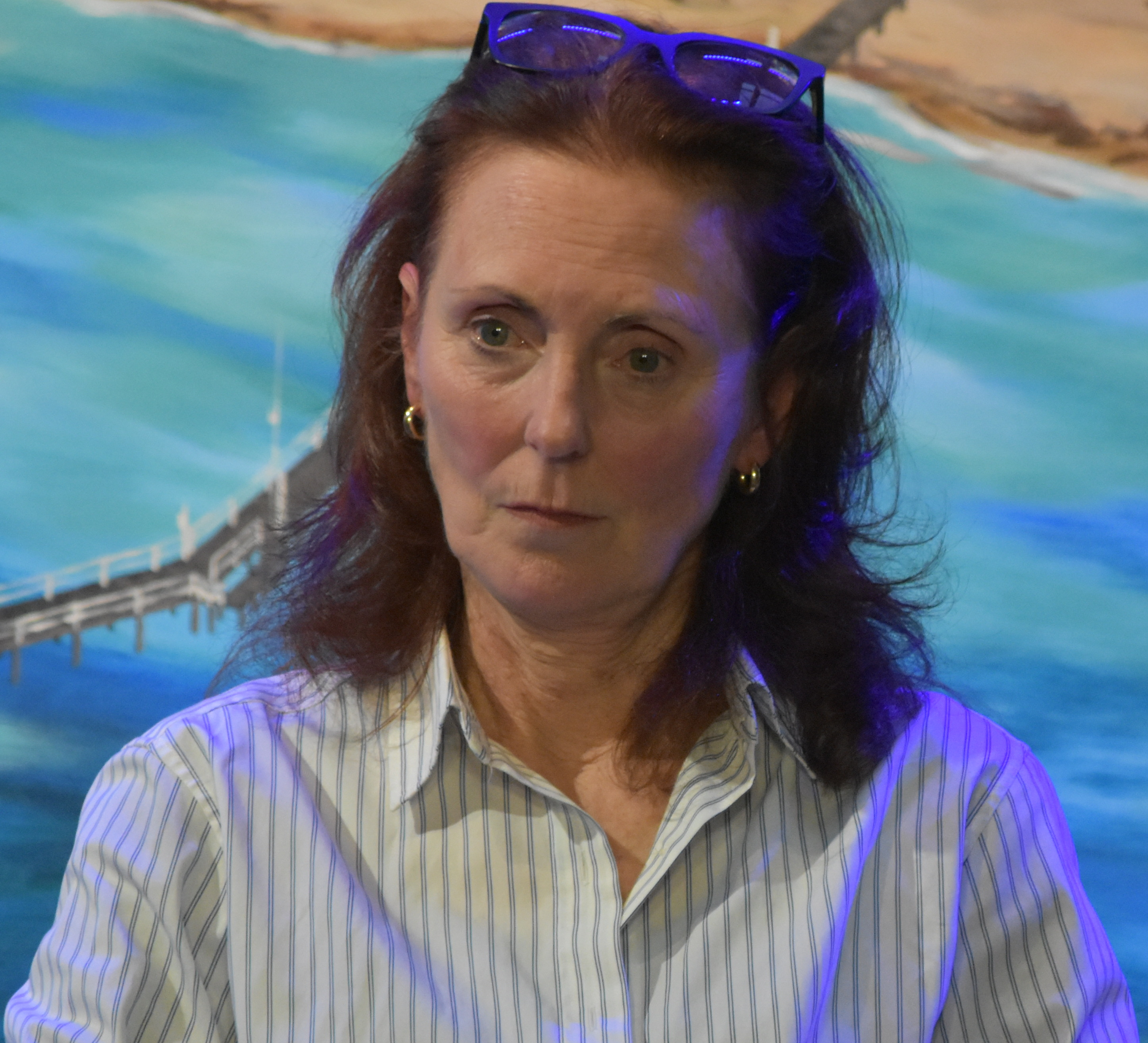
- Siversen in 2025 at the Queenscliffe Literary Festival
- Born: Melbourne, Australia
- Occupation: Actress
- Years active: 1981–present (Voice Artist, theatre, acting)
- Notable work: Prisoner (1984–1986); The Flying Doctors (1986–1990); House Husbands (2012–2017)
- Spouse: Theo Siversen (1983–present)
- Website: http://louisesiversen.com.au/

Louise Siversen is an Australian actress. She is known for her television roles, including Lou Kelly in Prisoner (1984–1986), Debbie in The Flying Doctors (1988–1990), and 2012–2017 Heather Looby in House Husbands. She has also appeared on stage and in film.

== Personal life ==
Siversen is married to Theo Siversen. They live in Melbourne.

Siversen has been an Iyengar Yoga student for over 15 years, and is also an avid walker, having walked the Camino Frances, an 800-kilometre walk across Northern Spain, in 2009.

== Training ==
Born in Melbourne, Siversen began acting as a child after her parents sent her to dance and drama classes to help her overcome her shyness. Siversen began to enjoy acting and went on to perform with St Martins Youth Theatre, appearing in many productions. Siversen was to study law, but decided to stick with acting after attending a Career Day at university.

Siversen has also trained in jazz dance and ballet.

== Career ==
=== Television ===
Siversen is best known for her portrayal of nasty Louise 'Lou' Kelly in the Network Ten series Prisoner. Siversen had done several bit-parts in the series and at the time the character of Lou was devised, and had been a regular extra for several months, playing one of the prisoners. Siversen auditioned, and got the part. Lou quickly became one of the main characters of the series and had a run of three years.

Her other TV credits include The Flying Doctors, Halifax f.p., 'Sugar and Spice, BackBerner, MDA, All Saints, Janus, Rush, Special Squad and House Husbands.

Siversen in 2021 gave an in-depth interview about her time on Prisoner on the podcast series Talking Prisoner, where she talked about her career, her hobbies, and voice acting.

=== Film ===
She appeared in the 1989 Australian horror film Houseboat Horror. In 2022, Siversen appeared in the horror film The Surrogate.

=== Stage ===
Siversen appeared in several productions for the Malthouse Theatre, Melbourne and the Melbourne Theatre Company. She also wrote her one-woman show Coming to My Senses in 1993. In 2017 she played Dotty/Mrs Clacket in Michael Frayn's Noises Off for the Melbourne Theatre Company and Queensland Theatre.

== Other activities ==
She teaches drama at the Victorian College of Arts and she also teaches in private practice and in drama methodology in Sydney.

== Acting credits ==
=== Film ===
Year	Title	Role	Type	Ref
1982	A Slice of Life	Nurse (as Louise Siverson)	Feature film	
1988	Evil Angels (aka A Cry in the Dark)	Jenny Miller (uncredited)	Feature film	
1989	Houseboat Horror	Zelia	Feature film	
1990	A Kink in the Picasso	Reporter	Feature film	
1994	That Eye, The Sky	Mrs. Cherry	Feature film	
1996	Shine	Extra in Ballroom Scene	Feature film	
1998	Crackers	Teacher	Feature film	
2000	Lost	Psychologist	Short film	
2002	Blow	Zoe	Short film	
2004	Josh Jarman	Therapist	Feature film	
2006	What's the Matter?	General Practitioner	Short film	
2008	Valentine's Day	Dawn	Feature film	
2008	Four of a Kind	Anne	Feature film	
2009	Shiny Thing	Carolyn Kibre	Short film	
2011	The Eye of the Storm	Carol	Feature film	
2013	The Kingdom of Doug	Maryanne	Short film	
2015	Sucker	Val – Dodgy Bar Woman	Feature film	
2022	Surrogate	Anna Paxton	Feature film	
TBA	The Returned	Vivianne		

=== Television ===
Year	Title	Role	Type
1981–1984; 1984–1986	Prisoner	Nurse / Tammy Fisher / Shop Assistant	TV series
1984	Carson's Law	Nurse No. 1 / Prostitute	TV series, 2 episodes
1984	Special Squad	Laura	TV series, episode 4: "Easy Street"
1984–1986	Prisoner	Lou Kelly / Louise	TV series, 151 episodes
1988	The Bartons	Angela	TV series, 1 episode
1988; 2001	Neighbours	Carol Barker	TV series, 1 episode
1988	House Rules	Elsa Nixon	TV series
1988	Sugar and Spice	Mrs Beatrice Robertson	TV series
1988–1990	The Flying Doctors	Debbie O'Brien	TV series, 14 episodes
1991	Chances	Cheryl Richards	TV series, 10 episodes
1992	Kelly	Glennis	TV series, 1 episode
1994–1995	Janus	Judge Glenda De Bono	TV series, 18 episodes
1994	The Damnation of Harvey McHugh	Annette	TV series, 3 episodes
1995; 2000	Halifax f.p.	Linda Quinn / Beth Hartley	TV series, 2 episodes
1996; 1999	Blue Heelers	Louise Fordham / Nola Tully	TV series, 2 episodes
1996	Law of the Land	Lynne Raynor	TV series, 1 episode
1997	The Adventures of Lano and Woodley	Doctor	TV series, 1 episode
1998	Good Guys Bad Guys	Shannon Blightie	TV series, 1 episode
1998	The Games	Jasmine Holt	TV series, 2 episodes
1998	Driven Crazy	Daisy	TV series, 1 episode
1998	State Coroner	Cheryl Norton	TV series, 1 episode
1999; 2002	Stingers	Olwyn O'Neill / Detective Rawlins	TV series, 2 episodes
1999	Crash Zone	Zoe Hansen	TV series, 4 episodes
1999	High Flyers	Nola	TV series, 26 episodes
1999–2002	BackBerner	Various characters	TV series, 128 episodes
2000	Eugenie Sandler PI	Winsome Bedford	TV series, 5 episodes
2000	Lost	Psychologist	TV series, 1 episode
2001	Neighbours	Angela Patrick	TV series, 2 episodes
2002	Short Cuts	Mrs. Bartlett	TV series, 9 episodes
2002	Bootleg	Mrs. Spring	TV miniseries, 3 episodes
2005	The Secret Life of Us	Marg	TV series, 1 episode
2005	MDA	Meg Morrison	TV series, 4 episodes
2006	Wicked Science	Elsa Bailey	TV series, 1 episode
2007	City Homicide	Janice Quinn	TV series, 1 episode
2008	All Saints	Tamara Pederson	TV series, 1 episode
2008	Rush	Raelene	TV series, 1 episode
2012–2017	House Husbands	Miss Heather Looby	TV series, 36 episodes
2013	The Doctor Blake Mysteries	Rosemary Morrisey	TV series, 1 episode
2015	Utopia	Linda Hillier	TV series, 1 episode
2016	Rake	Shirl	TV series, 2 episodes
2017	Ronny Chieng: International Student	Joy-Anne	TV series, 1 episode
2017	True Story with Hamish & Andy	Shop Lady	TV series, 1 episode
2020	The Gloaming	Minister Leonie Patrick	TV series, 1 episode
2020	Rosehaven	Kerry	TV series, season 4, 1 episode
2021	Celebration Nation	Paula	TV series, 3 episodes
2021	Five Bedrooms	Karen Stefiary	TV series, 1 episode
2021	Love Me	Judith	TV miniseries, 2 episodes
2024	Buried	Store manager	1 episode
2026	Bad Company	Carmel	5 episodes

=== Television (as self) ===
Year	Title	Role	Type
1989	In Melbourne Today	Guest	TV series, 1 episode
1991	In Sydney Today	Guest	TV series, 1 episode
1995; 1997	Good Morning Australia	Guest	TV series, 2 episodes
2001	People Dimensions	Guest	TV series, 1 episode
2023	You Don't Have to Hate the Movie People Forever – Interview with Louise Siversen	Herself	DVD/Video

== Theatre ==
Year	Title	Role	Type	Ref
1989	Morning Sacrifice		La Mama, Melbourne	
1989	The Misery of Beauty	Various roles	Theatre Works, Melbourne	
1991	The Girl Who Saw Everything	Carol Edge	Russell Street Theatre, Melbourne with MTC	
1993	Barmaids	Nancy	Peacock Theatre, Hobart with Zootango Theatre Company	
1993	Coming to My Senses	One-woman show	Malthouse Theatre, Melbourne	
1998	Dark: The Diane Arbus Story	Various roles	Melbourne Festival	
1999	Wonderful Ward	Bernadette / PA	Melbourne International Comedy Festival	
2000	Art and Soul	Various roles	Fairfax Studio, Melbourne with MTC	
2004	The Memory of Water	Teresa	Space 28, Southbank, Melbourne with MTC	
2007	Dimboola	Florence McAdam	Malthouse Theatre, Melbourne	
2007–2008	The Glory	Elizabeth	Fairfax Studio, Melbourne, The Butter Factory Theatre, Wodonga with HotHouse Theatre	
2008	Mum's the Word 2: Teenagers	Deborah	Playhouse, Brisbane, Comedy Theatre, Melbourne, Theatre Royal, Sydney, Burswood Theatre, Perth with Dainty Productions	
2009	Master of the Revels	Judy Forrister	Southbank Theatre, Melbourne with MTC	
2010	All About My Mother	Sister Rosa's Mother / Matron	Southbank Theatre, Melbourne with MTC	
2011	The Joy of Text	Diane	Fairfax Studio, Melbourne with MTC	
2013	True Minds	Vivienne Reynolds	Southbank Theatre with MTC	
2016	The Last Ten Minutes of History		Courthouse Theatre	
2016	I Can't Even...	One-woman show	Malthouse Theatre	
2017	Noises Off	Dotty Otley / Mrs Clackett	Playhouse, Brisbane with Queensland Theatre, Playhouse, Melbourne with MTC	
2019	Playlist		Trades Hall, Melbourne	
2020; 2022	The Heartbreak Choir	Totty	Southbank Theatre, Melbourne & online with MTC	
2021	Birthday Cake	One-woman show	Geelong Arts Centre with The Space Company & online – Australia	
2023	Croydon		Malthouse Theatre, Melbourne	
2023	A Very Jewish Christmas Carol	Carol / Rein-Dybbuk / Ensemble	Southbank Theatre, Melbourne with MTC	
2023	Underneath Ms Archer	Kelly Archer (also co-writer)	St Martins Theatre, Fortyfivedownstairs	
2023	Hell's Gates	Various roles	Geelong Arts Centre with The Space Company	
2024	Birthday Cake	One-woman show	Geelong Arts Centre	
