= River Street (film) =

- Directed by: Tony Mahood
- Written by: Phillip Ryall
- Starring: Aden Young; Bill Hunter; Essie Davis; Mitchell Dillon
- Edited by: Dany Cooper
- Release date: 1996
- Country: Australia
- Language: English
- Budget: A$3.1 million
- Box office: A$82,940(Australia)

River Street is a 1996 Australian film directed by Tony Mahood and starring Aden Young, Bill Hunter, Essie Davis, and Mitchell Dillon.

== Cast ==
- Aden Young as Ben
- Bill Hunter as Vincent Pierce
- Essie Davis as Wendy Davis
- Tammy MacIntosh as Sharon Pierce
- Sullivan Stapleton as Chris
- Ruby Rees as Baby
- Tommy Dysart as Sergeant
- Gerald Lepkowski as Constable Monroe
- Mike Bishop as Constable Mark Rogers
- Peter Hosking as Foreman

== Synopsis ==
Ben Egan is a go-getter who works for shady real estate man Vincent Pierce. He is also engaged to marry Pierce’s daughter, Sharon.

After Ben blows a big real estate deal and is convicted for striking a police officer, he is sentenced to community service at a drop-in centre for street kids, run by Wendy. When he realises that the rundown property, owned by Wendy’s trusting old grandmother, is prime real estate, Ben cons her into selling it to him. While this impresses Pierce and Sharon, Ben begins to rethink his actions when he befriends Chris (one of the kids who frequents the centre), and when he begins to develop an attraction to Wendy.

== Production ==
The film, by first-time director Tony Mahood was the third production from Melbourne-based company, House & Moorhouse, following Proof (1991) and Muriel's Wedding (1994). Filming began on 18 September 1995.

== Release ==
The film premiered at the Melbourne International Film Festival on 10 July 1996. It also screened at the BFI London Film Festival and the Montreal World Film Festival the same year. It grossed A$82,940, on a budget of A$3.1 million.

== Reception ==
In a review for Variety magazine, film critic David Stratton called the film "a modest feel-good comedy with pleasant performances but not much originality." He went on to say: "The actors keep some interest alive" and "Production values are surprisingly modest, with Martin McGrath’s low-key photography below his usual high standard. Music score by David Bridie and John Phillips becomes obvious after a good start. Occasional voiceover narration too often spells out what should already be clear to the audience."

Film critic Adrian Martin gave the film one star, writing: "Although it aspires to the condition of hard-hitting, truth-telling drama, it comes off like another, contemporaneous Australian release." He also stated: "Unfortunately, most of the running time is devoted to a tiresome, easy tale of moral redemption, family values and supposedly authentic, streetwise experience – almost none of which rings true" and "Like many Australian productions, River Street lacks narrative and cinematic oomph."
