= Picnic at Hanging Rock (TV series) =

2018 Australian mystery television series

- Amazon Prime Video promotional poster
- Genre: Mystery; Romance; Drama
- Based on: Picnic at Hanging Rock by Joan Lindsay
- Written by: Beatrix Christian; Alice Addison
- Directed by: Michael Rymer; Larysa Kondracki; Amanda Brotchie
- Starring: Natalie Dormer; Lily Sullivan; Lola Bessis; Harrison Gilbertson; Samara Weaving; Madeleine Madden; Inez Currò; Ruby Rees; Yael Stone; Philip Quast; Marcus Graham; James Hoare; Mark Coles Smith; Don Hany
- Composers: Cezary and Jan Skubiszewski
- Country of origin: Australia
- Original language: English
- No. of seasons: 1
- No. of episodes: 6

Production
- Executive producers: Jo Porter; Anthony Ellis; Penny Win
- Producers: Brett Popplewell; Antonia Barnard; Jo Porter
- Production location: Melbourne, Australia
- Editors: Geoff Hitchins; Anne Carter
- Running time: 60 minutes
- Production company: Fremantle Australia

Original release
- Network: Showcase
- Release: 6 May 2018

Picnic at Hanging Rock is an Australian mystery romantic drama television series that premiered on Foxtel's Showcase on 6 May 2018. The series was adapted from Joan Lindsay's 1967 novel of the same name about a group of schoolgirls who, while on an outing to Hanging Rock, mysteriously disappear. The score won the Screen Music Award for Best Music for a Television Series.

== Plot ==
Hester Appleyard purchases an isolated mansion out in the Australian bush to transform into a school for young ladies – a few months later, Appleyard College is a success. On Valentine's Day, 1900, when students and staff go for a picnic to Hanging Rock, three of the school's star students and their governess mysteriously vanish. Their disappearance leaves a devastating impact on students, staff, their enigmatic and formidable headmistress and the township at large. Theories abound, secrets are exposed and hysteria sets in, until eventually, the lives of the characters unravel.

== Cast and characters ==
=== Main ===
- Natalie Dormer as Mrs Hester Appleyard, headmistress
- Lily Sullivan as Miranda Reid
- Lola Bessis as Mademoiselle Dianne de Poitiers, mistress of French Conversation
- Harrison Gilbertson as Michael Fitzhubert
- Samara Weaving as Irma Leopold
- Madeleine Madden as Marion Quade
- Inez Currò as Sara Waybourne
- Ruby Rees as Edith Horton
- Yael Stone as Miss Dora Lumley, mistress of Deportment and Bible Studies
- Philip Quast as Arthur Appleyard, Hester's late husband
- Marcus Graham as Tomasetti
- James Hoare as Albert Crundall
- Mark Coles Smith as Tom
- Don Hany as Dr. Mackenzie

=== Supporting ===
- Anna McGahan as Miss Greta McCraw, mistress of Geography and Mathematics
- Sibylla Budd as Mrs Valange, mistress of Art and Literature
- Randall Berger
- Kate Bradford as Rose Kenton
- Ines English
- Kaarin Fairfax as Cook
- John Flaus as Mr. Whitehead, the gardener
- Mayah Fredes as Rosamund Swift
- Nicholas Hope as Colonel Fitzhubert
- Roslyn Gentle as Mrs. Fitzhubert
- Emily Gruhl as Minnie
- Kym Gyngell as Charlie Seymour-Baker
- Huw Higginson as Jasper Cosgrove
- Rob Jacobson
- Felix Johnson as Trooper Nolan
- Markella Kavenagh as Myrtle
- Julie Nihill as Mrs. Horton
- Jonny Pasvolsky as Sgt. Bumpher
- Alyssa Tuddenham as Lily Kenton
- Bethany Whitmore as Blanche Gifford
- Jacqueline Brennan as Mrs McCready

== Production ==
Filming commenced in February 2017 at Labassa, Caulfield, Mandeville Hall, Toorak, Rippon Lea, Elsternwick, Werribee Park, as well as Lysterfield Park and on Fraser St in the Victorian goldfields town of Clunes. Larysa Kondracki served as showrunner and directed the first three episodes.

== Episodes ==
No.	Title	Directed by	Written by	Original release date
1	"Episode One"	Larysa Kondracki	Beatrix Christian	6 May 2018
2	"Episode Two"	Larysa Kondracki	Beatrix Christian	6 May 2018
3	"Episode Three"	Larysa Kondracki	Beatrix Christian	6 May 2018
4	"Episode Four"	Amanda Brotchie	Alice Addison	6 May 2018
5	"Episode Five"	Michael Rymer	Alice Addison	6 May 2018
6	"Episode Six"	Michael Rymer	Beatrix Christian	6 May 2018

== Broadcast ==
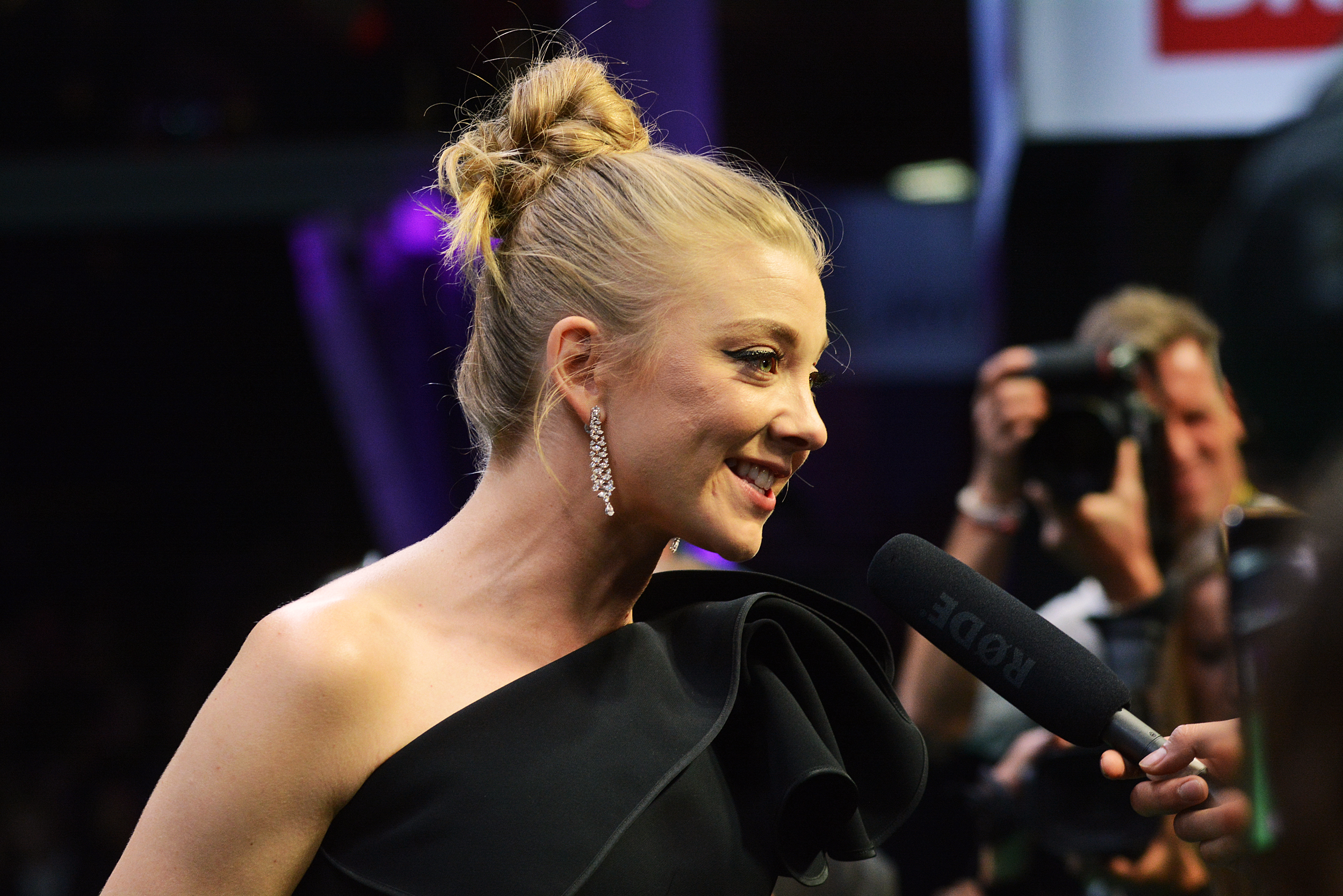
British actress Natalie Dormer attends the Picnic at Hanging Rock Interview during the 14th Zurich Film Festival on October 5, 2018, in Switzerland.

The series premiered in Australia on Showcase in 2018. The program was acquired by the BBC in the United Kingdom, Canal+ in France, RTÉ in Ireland and Amazon Prime Video in the United States. The series was also broadcast in Greece by ERT.

== Reception ==
On the review aggregator website Rotten Tomatoes, 79% of 53 critics' reviews are positive, with an average rating of 6.5/10. The website's consensus reads: "Natalie Dormer charms in Picnic at Hanging Rock, a stylish retelling of an Australian classic -- though convoluted sub-plots at times distract from its otherwise tantalizing delights."
