= Josh Jarman =

- Directed by: Pip Mushin
- Written by: Pip Mushin
- Starring: Marcus Graham; Suzy Cato; Kym Gyngell
- Release date: 2004
- Running time: 96 minutes
- Country: Australia
- Language: English
- Box office: A$11,800 (Australia)

Josh Jarman is a 2004 Australian comedy film directed by Pip Mushin and starring Marcus Graham. Filming took place around Melbourne, Australia.

== Plot ==
Josh Jarman is a playwright who can't find anyone to produce his dramatic play. The only producer to show some interest would like to turn it into a musical. This leaves Josh with a dilemma, does he sell out for fame and fortune or does he insist on his artistic integrity, but if he does that he will remain a struggling playwright?

== Cast ==
- Marcus Graham as Josh Jarman
- Suzy Cato as Edwina Billows
- Kym Gyngell as Stan Billows
- Alex Menglet as Sebastian
- Daniela Farinacci as Maxine
- Kestie Morassi as Sasha
- Damien Richardson as Russ
- Damian Walshe-Howling as Fringe Theatre Actor
- Deidre Rubenstein as Theatre Actress
- Louise Siversen as Therapist

== Box office ==
Josh Jarman grossed $11,800 at the box office in Australia.

== See also ==
- Cinema of Australia
