= Ruby Rees =

Australian actress, director and writer (born 1995)

Ruby Rees, also known as Ruby Rees-Wemyss, is an Australian actress, director and writer. She is best known for playing “Edith” a main character in Picnic at Hanging Rock, in 2018, alongside Natalie Dormer and Samara Weaving.

== Education ==
Ruby Rees was formerly named Ruby Rees-Wemyss.

Rees partook in the Larry Moss Masterclass at the 16th Street Actors Studio in Melbourne, Australia, and was then as a full-time student at HB Studio in New York City.

== Career ==
Rees first appeared on screen as a baby in the 1996 Australian movie River Street (film). From 2010, Rees starred in a number of short films Warhead, Once, A Frigid Night, Bracelet , Good Boy, Harvey and The Hunt, as well as appearing on television in The Saddle Club in 2008 and Miss Fisher's Murder Mysteries in 2012. Rees starred as “Edith” a main character in Foxtel's Picnic at Hanging Rock, in 2018, alongside Natalie Dormer and Samara Weaving.

In 2020, Rees performed for Bolinda an unabridged narration of Anthea Bell's English translation of Erich Kästner's 1949 German children's novel The Parent Trap, the basis for Disney's 1961 film adaptation of the same name starring Hayley Mills and its 1998 remake starring Lindsay Lohan.

== Writing and directing ==
Rees has written and directed the award-winning play Serpents, which was performed at the St Michael's theatre, Melbourne, Australia in 2010. Rees directed the play Neighbourhood Watch, directed and screenwrote the short film Alien about a young girl, dealing with racism, which was shortlisted for the Tropfest short film festival, Australia, in 2014.

In 2014, she moved to New York City, where she continued to write and direct plays with The Manhattan Repertory Theatre, her play Kaston debuting there in 2015. wrote the play Bad religion in 2016, and wrote and starred in the short film “Harvey.

In 2022, she directed her sister Eva Rees in the latter's stage writing debut, he/r (or, remember tomorrow when everything was ok), a Fairly Lucid Production, which was staged at Fortyfivedownstairs in Melbourne.

== Filmography ==
Year	Title	Role
1996	River Street (film)	Baby
2010	Warhead (Short)	Joe
2011	Once (Short)	Self-Consciousness
2012	Bracelet (Short)	Danielle
2012	A Frigid Night (Short)	Amy
2013	Good Boy (Short)	Sophia
2014	Alien (Short)	Writer and director
2018	The Hunt (Short)	Rose
2018	Harvey (Short)	Revengeful little girl

== Television ==
Year	Title	Role
2008	The Saddle Club	Lily (1 episode)
2012-2013	Miss Fisher's Murder Mysteries	Jane (8 episodes)
2018	Picnic at Hanging Rock	Edith (6 episodes)
