= Law of the Land (TV series) =

- Title card from Season 1
- Created by: Ro Hume; Sue Masters
- Starring: Lisa Hensley; David Roberts; Wynn Roberts; Richard Moir; Tamblyn Lord
- Country of origin: Australia
- No. of seasons: 4
- No. of episodes: 52

Production
- Running time: 50 minutes
- Production companies: Roadshow, Coote and Carroll

Original release
- Network: Nine Network
- Release: 20 April 1993 – 22 January 1999

Law of the Land is an Australian television drama series that screened on the Nine Network from 1993 to 1999.

The series was set in the fictional country town of Merringanee and centred on the unique way that locals dealt with and enforced the law. Storylines in Law of the Land were serialised, with one larger plot covering the season.

The series was created by Ro Hume and Sue Masters and produced by Bruce Best, Matt Carroll, Richard Clendinnen and Terrie Vincent.

== Cast ==
=== Main / regular ===
- Lisa Hensley as Kate Chalmers
- David Roberts as Peter Lawrence
- Wyn Roberts as Hamilton Chalmers
- Richard Moir as Sergeant Clive O'Connor
- David Walters as Sean O'Connor
- Angelo D'Angelo as Sergeant Marc Rosetti
- Debbie Byrne as Jean Jardine
- Tamblyn Lord as David Jardine
- Lindy Wallis as Trish Miles
- Shane Connor as Harry Miles
- Radha Mitchell as Alicia Miles
- Abbie Holmes as Audrey O'Connor
- Peter O'Brien as Andy Cochrane
- Frances O'Connor as Marissa Green
- Alexandra Fowler as Jacqui Rushcutter
- Fiona Spence as Magistrate Maggie Mulcahy
- Rebecca Frith as Alex Lentini
- Tessa Humphries as Hannah Scott
- Mike Bishop as Ray Richmond
- Michael O'Neill as Michael Delaney
- Sapidah Kian as Shirin Rasidi
- Bruce Hughes as Nick Rogers
- Karmen Raspovic as Heather Coleman

=== Guests ===
- Alan Hopgood as Reg Bates (1 episode)
- Andrew Blackman as James Forster (3 episodes)
- Angela Punch McGregor as Angela Goodman (1 episode)
- Beth Buchanan as Danni Cairns (1 episode)
- Cameron Nugent as Todd Rankin (1 episode)
- Christopher Milne as Minister (1 episode)
- Diane Craig (2 episodes)
- Esben Storm as Peter Bozavich (1 episode)
- Gemma Bishop as Gabby Richmond (1 episode)
- Jack Finsterer as Bobby Webster (1 episode)
- John Brumpton as Roger Halliday (1 episode)
- Louise Siversen as Lynne Raynor (1 episode)
- Marnie Reece-Wilmore as Serena Goodman (1 episode)
- Mike Bishop as Ray Richmond (1 episode)
- Nick Carrafa as Neil (1 episode)
- Norman Kaye as Charlie Carmody (1 episode)
- Olivia Hamnett as Blanche Avery (1 episode)
- Petra Yared as Caroline Rodwell (1 episode)
- Reg Gorman as Gary Jarvis (1 episode)
- Sarah Chadwick as Loretta (1 episode)

== Episodes ==
=== Season One ===
No. overall	No. in season	Title	Directed by	Written by	Original release date
1	1	TBA	Julian Pringle	Unknown	20 April 1993
2	2	TBA	Julian Pringle	Unknown	27 April 1993
3	3	TBA	Richard Sarell	Unknown	4 May 1993
4	4	TBA	Richard Sarell	Unknown	11 May 1993
5	5	TBA	Michael Offer	Unknown	18 May 1993
6	6	TBA	Michael Offer	Unknown	25 May 1993
7	7	TBA	Michael Offer	Unknown	1 June 1993
8	8	TBA	Julian Pringle	Unknown	8 June 1993
9	9	TBA	Julian Pringle	Unknown	15 June 1993
10	10	TBA	Richard Sarell	Unknown	22 June 1993
11	11	TBA	Richard Sarell	Unknown	29 June 1993
12	12	TBA	Ian Watson	Unknown	6 July 1993
13	13	TBA	Ian Watson	Unknown	13 July 1993

=== Season Two ===
No. overall	No. in season	Title	Directed by	Written by	Original release date
14	1	TBA	Steve Jodrell	Unknown	11 July 1994
15	2	TBA	Unknown	Unknown	12 July 1994
16	3	TBA	TBD	TBD	1994
17	4	TBA	TBD	TBD	1994
18	5	TBA	TBD	TBD	1994
19	6	TBA	TBD	TBD	1994
20	7	TBA	TBD	TBD	1994
21	8	TBA	TBD	TBD	1994
22	9	TBA	TBD	TBD	1994
23	10	TBA	TBD	TBD	1994
24	11	TBA	TBD	TBD	1994
25	12	TBA	TBD	TBD	1994
26	13	TBA	Unknown	Unknown	20 September 1994

=== Season Three ===
No. overall	No. in season	Title	Directed by	Written by	Original release date
27	1	"Nothing's Forever"	Unknown	Unknown	27 September 1994
28	2	"Death Before Dying"	Unknown	Unknown	4 October 1994
29	3	"The Last Run Mixed Messages"	Unknown	Unknown	11 October 1994
30	4	"And Baby Makes Two"	Unknown	Unknown	18 October 1994
31	5	"Mixed Messages"	Unknown	Unknown	25 October 1994
32	6	"Autumn Harvest"	Unknown	Unknown	1 November 1994
33	7	"Whispers"	Unknown	Unknown	8 November 1994
34	8	"Fear and Loathing"	Steve Jodrell	Emma J. Steele	15 November 1994
35	9	"Death or Glory"	Unknown	Unknown	22 November 1994
36	10	"A Matter of Inches"	Unknown	Unknown	6 December 1994
37	11	"Games People Play"	Steve Jodrell	Unknown	13 December 1994
38	12	"Line of Duty"	Unknown	Unknown	20 December 1994
39	13	"Win, Lose and Draw"	Unknown	Unknown	27 December 1994

=== Season Four ===
No. overall	No. in season	Title	Directed by	Written by	Original release date
40	1	"Glory Road"	Unknown	Unknown	28 December 1995
41	2	"Leader of the Pack"	Unknown	Unknown	3 January 1996
42	3	"Someone to Watch Over Me"	Unknown	Unknown	4 January 1996
43	4	"Mother and Child"	Unknown	Unknown	11 January 1996
44	5	"First Do No Harm"	Unknown	Unknown	17 January 1996
45	6	"Mice and Men"	Unknown	Unknown	18 January 1996
46	7	"Broken by the Drought"	Unknown	Unknown	31 January 1996
47	8	"Late Kill"	Unknown	Unknown	4 October 1997
48	9	"Pandora's Box"	TBA	TBA	TBA
49	10	"Winner Take All"	Unknown	Unknown	8 January 1999
50	11	"Spotlight"	Chris Langman	Unknown	22 January 1999
51	12	"Up in Smoke"	TBA	TBA	TBA
52	13	"The More Things Change"	TBA	TBA	TBA

== See also ==
- Lex loci – the Legal Latin phrase for conflicts of law
- List of Australian television series
