= Alexander Cappelli =

Australian musician/actor

Alexander (Alex) Cappelli
- Born: 4 October 1984 (age 41); Victoria, Australia
- Occupations: Musician, actor
- Known for: Hating Alison Ashley (2005); Short Cuts (2002)

Alexander (Alex) Cappelli (born 4 October 1984) is an Australian musician and actor.

== Early life ==
Alex developed an interest in acting while making amateur films, in which he then started acting. From there, he enrolled in drama school in 2000 and procured an agent in 2001.

== Career ==
Cappelli has had many acting roles on Australian television, playing the recurring guest role of Mike Pill in long-running soap opera Neighbours, Gresham in the 2005 telemovie Little Oberon and a starring role as Kurt Winters in the 2002 children's television series, Short Cuts.

As an actor, he is best known for his lead role in the 2005 feature comedy film, Hating Alison Ashley. Working alongside Delta Goodrem and Saskia Burmeister, he played the character of Barry Hollis, the school bully. Other television credits include children's series Wicked Science, police procedural series Blue Heelers and 2004 crime thriller tv movie The Brush-Off.

Cappelli is also the lead singer, guitarist and pianist in the local Melbourne original rock band 'The Collectibles'.

== Filmography ==
=== Film ===
Year	Title	Role	Notes
2005	Hating Alison Ashley	Barry Hollis	
2006	Wil	Adam Schindel	

=== Television ===
Year	Title	Role	Notes
2001; 2004	Blue Heelers	Jay Fielding / Damien Shaw	2 episodes
2002	Stingers	Male clubber	1 episode
2002	Short Cuts	Kurt Winters	26 episodes
2004	The Brush-Off	Youth	TV movie
2005	Wicked Science	Shannon	1 episode
2002; 2005	Neighbours	Mike Pill / Rueben Alecantero / Dusk Dundler / Barry Shears	16 episodes
2005	Little Oberon	Gresham	TV movie
