= Bethany Whitmore =

Australian actress (born 1999)

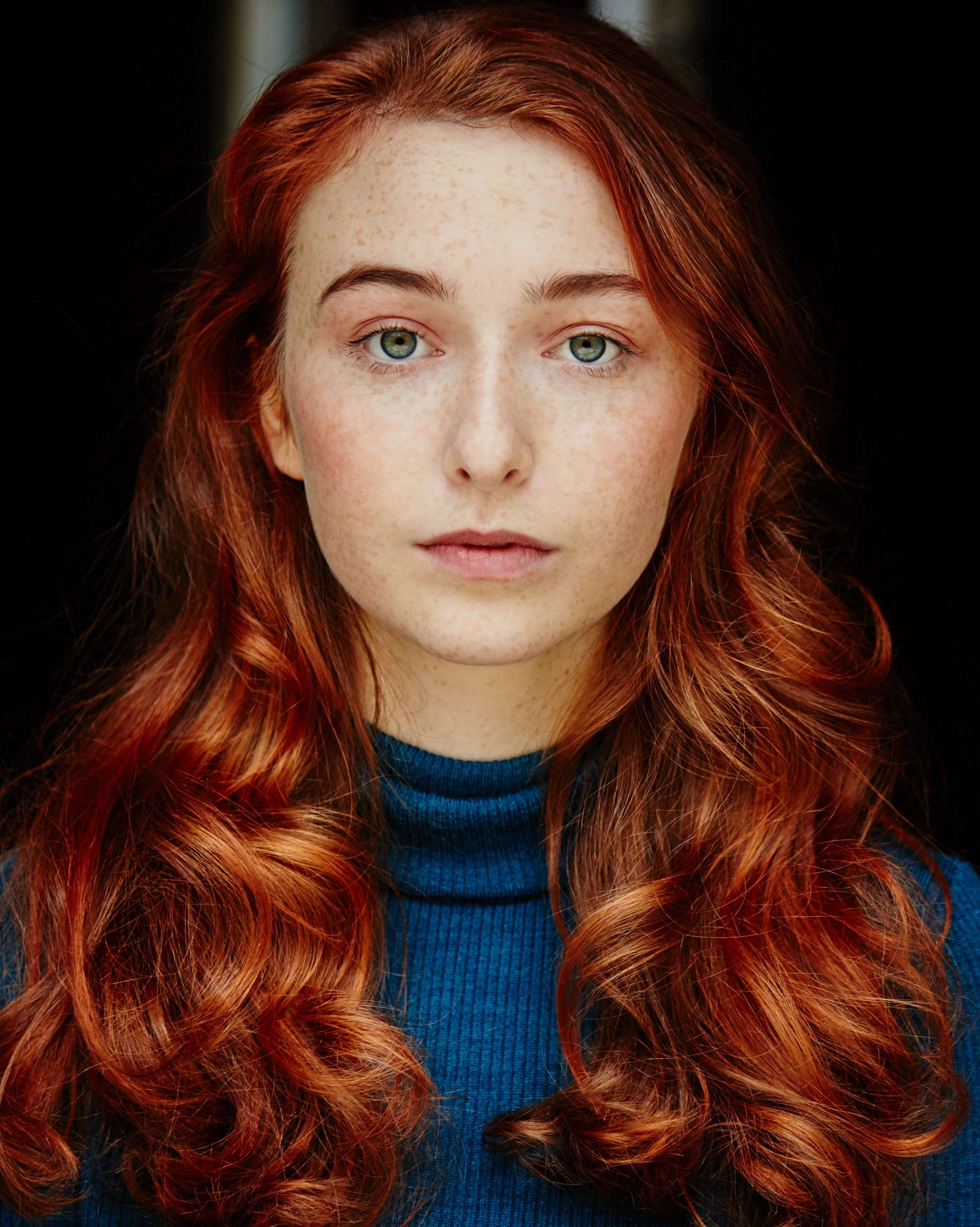
- Bethany Whitmore in 2017
- Born: Bethany Sarah Whitmore; 7 December 1999 (age 26); Melbourne, Victoria, Australia
- Occupation: Actress
- Years active: 2006–present

Bethany Sarah Whitmore (born 7 December 1999) is an Australian actress, who started her professional acting career starring as Jaden Kagan in the US TV mini-series The Starter Wife. Bethany is also known for her lead voice role of 8-year-old Mary Daisy Dinkle in Adam Elliot's Mary and Max (2009), Jane Moochmore in PJ Hogan's Mental (2012), Greta Driscoll in Girl Asleep (2015), Melissa in The Family Law (2016–19) and Blanche Gifford in the TV series remake of Picnic at Hanging Rock (2017). Bethany was also a finalist for the 10th anniversary Heath Ledger Scholarship in 2018.

In 2025, Bethany graduated with a Master of Film and Television (Screen Producing) from the Victorian College of the Arts, University of Melbourne.

== Personal life ==
Whitmore was born in Melbourne, Australia. Since childhood, she has pursued an acting career. At age 6, she starred in The Starter Wife. She studied drama at RADA, NIDA, St Martins Youth Theatre, & 16th Street. Her theatre appearances include Cat on a Hot Tin Roof for the Melbourne Theatre Company.

Whitmore currently resides in Melbourne.

== Filmography ==
=== Films ===
- Mary and Max (2009) as the voice of 8-year-old Mary Daisy Dinkle
- Summer Coda (2010) as Katie
- Mental (2012) as Jane Moochmore
- Girl Asleep (2015) as Greta Driscoll

=== Television ===
- Rove Live (2006) as Panellist 'Understanding 5's' Commercial Spoof (1 episode)
- The Starter Wife (2007) as Jaden Kagan (6 episodes) "Hour 1", "Hour 2", "Hour 3", "Hour 4", "Hour 5" and "Hour 6"
- Rush (2008) as Sadie 1 episode: "Pilot"
- Whatever Happened to That Guy? (2009) as Bethany (1 episode)
- Thank God You're Here (2009) as Additional Cast (1 episode)
- Killing Time (2011) as Olivia Fraser (7 episodes)
- Winners & Losers (2011) as Maddie Sommers (2 episodes)
- The Family Law (2016–19) as Melissa Hills in S1, S2 & S3 (18 episodes)
- Picnic at Hanging Rock (2017) as Blanche Gifford (6 episodes)
- Five Bedrooms (2021) as Olivia (1 episode)

=== Awards ===
- Won MEAA Equity Best Comedy Ensemble 2020 – S3 The Family Law
- Finalist – Heath Ledger Scholarship 2018 HLS10 Australians in Film
- Nominated Best Young Actor – St Kilda Film Festival 2018 – MWAH Short Film
- Won MEAA Equity Best Comedy Ensemble 2018 – S2 The Family Law
- Nominated Best Actress: Film Critics Circle of Australia Award 2017 for Girl Asleep
- Nominated Best Actress: Australian Film Critics Association Award 2017 for Girl Asleep
- Won MEAA Equity Best Comedy Ensemble 2017 – S1 The Family Law
- Won 16th Street Foundation Young Actors Award 2017
