= Michelle Law =

Australian writer

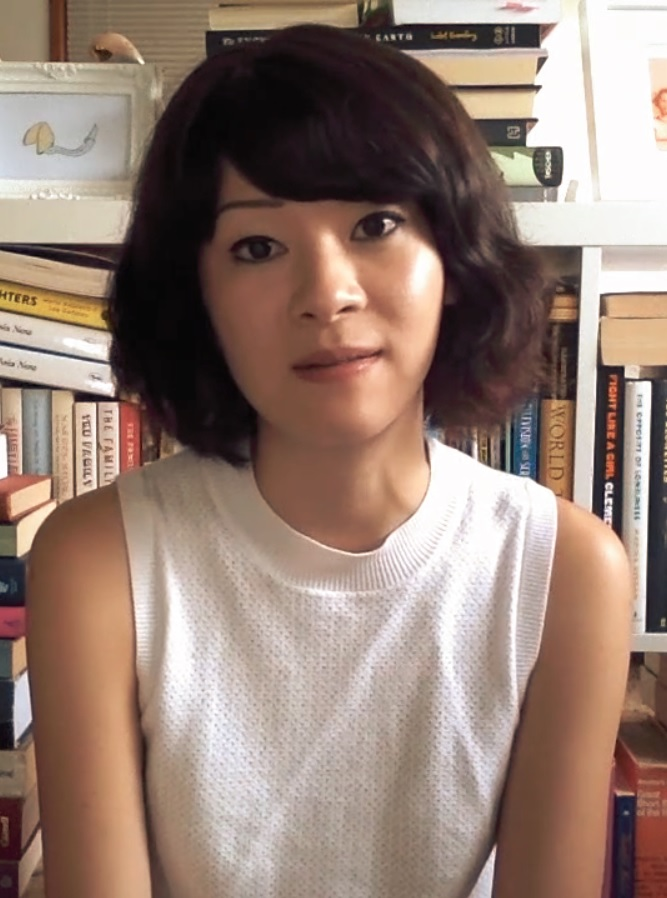
- Born: Sunshine Coast, Australia
- Education: Queensland University of Technology (BFA)
- Occupation: Writer
- Relatives: Benjamin Law (brother)
- Writing career
- Period: 2008–present
- Website: Official website

Michelle Law is an Australian writer. She is known for the web series Homecoming Queens, and the book Sh*t Asian Mothers Say, co-authored by her brother Benjamin Law, and her 2017 play Single Asian Female. She is of Chinese descent.

== Early life and education ==
Law was born on the Sunshine Coast, Queensland, as the fifth of five children to immigrant parents from Hong Kong and Malaysia. She attended Sunshine Coast school Immanuel Lutheran College, Buderim throughout her school years.

She completed a Bachelor of Fine Arts in creative writing at the Queensland University of Technology.

== Career ==
She wrote the adolescent-themed short film Bloomers, released in 2013, which was completed through successful crowdfunding and Screen Australia's Short Film Completion Fund.

She presented on the topic of co-authorship with her brother Benjamin Law, as part of the Literary Friendship series at the 2014 Sydney Writers' Festival.

Her 2017 play, Single Asian Female, a comedy about a Chinese-Australian family, was considered to be groundbreaking in Australian theatre, as it featured three Chinese-Australian women in leading roles. It opened at Brisbane's Roundhouse Theatre for La Boite Theatre Company in February 2017, and at Sydney's Belvoir St Theatre in February 2018.

In August 2017, Law was commissioned by SBS Television and Screen Australia to co-write a comedy drama series, Homecoming Queens. She co-wrote the semi-autobiographical series, which focuses on two friends with chronic illness living in Queensland, with Chloë Reeson. It premiered on SBS on Demand in April 2018, with Law playing the part of "Michelle Low" and Liv Hewson playing the part of Chloë Reeson.

Law's play Top Coat, a body swap comedy, was staged by Sydney Theatre Company, directed by Courtney Stewart, from 26 June to 6 August 2022.

As of 2022 Law is based in Sydney, New South Wales.

== Other roles ==
In December 2021 Law presented a talk on alopecia and A bald woman's guide to survival at the empowerment-themed TEDxSouthBankWomen event.

Law is an ambassador for the Emerging Writers' Festival.

== Recognition and awards ==
In April 2012, Law was selected as part of Youth Arts Queensland's JUMP Mentoring Program.

She won an AWGIE in 2012 in the Interactive Media category, for her screenwriting on SLiDE.

She was a runner-up in the Written Word Category in the Qantas 2013 Spirit of Youth Awards (SOYA 365).

In 2013, she received funding towards her writing career through the Australia Council's ArtStart program.

In 2015, she was commissioned to write a Brisbane-themed poem for the Brisbane Poetry Map.

In 2016, she won one of the Queensland Premier's Young Publishers and Writers Awards at the Queensland Literary Awards.

== Portrayal ==
Law was portrayed by actress Vivian Wei in the comedy TV series The Family Law (2016-2017), written by her brother Benjamin.

== Tweets in the media ==
She has previously worked at Brisbane's Avid Reader bookshop. In June 2017, Men's Rights Activists targeted the bookshop with online downvoting, because it shared news about Clementine Ford's second book. Michelle and her brother Ben advocated for the bookshop, which effectively combated the downvotes by garnering hundreds of positive five-star reviews from the bookshop's supporters.

In October 2017, one of her tweets was featured in a Sydney Morning Herald article, decrying the online abuse from HSC students towards poet Ellen van Neerven.

In November 2017, she tweeted to The Guardian's "Australian Bird of the Year" poll with an Australian version of the "Nothing but respect for my president" meme.

In February 2018, Law tweeted about the inappropriateness of "Wonton of Laughs", a show in the BrisAsia Festival. The show's promotional poster appeared to depict Asian comedians floating in a bowl of wonton soup.

== Bibliography ==
=== Articles ===
Law has written for Seizure, Meanjin (2012), Screen Education (June 2014), Peril: An Asian-Australian Journal (December 2015), Good Weekend and Frankie (2017).

She has written for The Lifted Brow on travel and loneliness (January 2010), teachability of MasterChef (October 2011), the nuances of Game of Thrones (December 2011), the continued appeal of The Golden Girls (October 2012), longevity of reality television (December 2012), the possibilities of musical theatre (February 2013), bookish television characters (September 2013), interviewed writer Margo Lanagan (September 2013), the lack of onscreen depictions of unsexy sex (February 2014), and expectations around being an adult (March 2015).

Her 2015 guest review of Charlotte's Web for Going Down Swinging's "The Rory Gilmore Reading Challenge" expanded on her earlier Gilmore Girls articles in The Lifted Brow.

She has written for the Griffith Review on the nuances of romantic relationships (2013's Once Upon a Time in Oz), on dual cultural identity (2015), and sibling conversations (2017).

She has written for The Sydney Morning Herald on misogynist "bro culture" perpetuated by Melbourne University Liberal Club members, selfie etiquette, the physicality of hands, and writers engaging in marketing.

=== Books ===
Authored

- —— (2022). Asian Girls are Going Places. Hardie Grant Explore. ISBN 978-1-74117-712-1.

Co-authored

- —— (2014). Sh*t Asian mothers say. Collingwood, Vic.: Black Inc. ISBN 978-1-86395-663-5.

Contributed chapters

- —— (2008). "A call to arms". Growing up Asian in Australia. Melbourne: Black Inc. pp. 242–245. ISBN 978-1-86395-191-3.
- —— (2011). "Dear hair...". In Hardy, Marieke; McGuire, Michaela (eds.). Women of letters: reviving the lost art of correspondence. Camberwell: Viking. pp. 237–240. ISBN 978-0-670-07609-3.
- —— (2015). "A fairer country". In Caro, Jane (ed.). Destroying the joint. Read How You Want. pp. 25–34. ISBN 978-1-4596-8729-5. – A portion of the chapter was also published as an excerpt in The Sun Herald (May 2013).
- —— (2016). "Joyride". In Katsonis, Maria; Kofman, Lee (eds.). Rebellious daughters: true stories from Australia's finest female writers. Edgecliff: Ventura Press. pp. 259–273. ISBN 978-1-925183-52-8.
- —— (2016). "How is your sex life?". In Pickering, Karen (ed.). Doing it: women tell the truth about great sex. St. Lucia, Queensland: University of Queensland Press. pp. 165–171. ISBN 978-0-7022-5423-9.
- —— (2016). "Pauline Hanson's eviction speech". In Ryan, Luke (ed.). Best Australian comedy writing. South Melbourne, Victoria: Affirm Press. pp. 243–248. ISBN 978-1-925475-26-5.

=== Screenwriting ===
- Suicide and me, Sydney, NSW Australian Broadcasting Corporation, 2013
- Bloomers (short film), 2013
- Deadlock (web series of 5 episodes), 2017
- Homecoming Queens (web series of 7 episodes), 2018

=== Plays ===
- Single Asian Female
  - La Boite Theatre (Roundhouse), Brisbane, February–March 2017
  - Belvoir St. Theatre, Sydney, February–March 2018
- Top Coat
  - Sydney Theatre Company, Wharf Theatre, 25 June – 6 August 2022
- Miss Peony - Belvoir St Theatre, 2023

=== Filmography ===
| Year | Title | Role | Notes |
|---|---|---|---|
| 2018 | Homecoming Queens | Michelle Low | Web series; co-star and screenwriter |
