= Good Guys, Bad Guys =

- Genre: Mystery
- Created by: Roger Simpson
- Written by: Jon Stephens
- Starring: Marcus Graham; Travis McMahon; Alison Whyte
- Country of origin: Australia
- Original language: English
- No. of seasons: 2
- No. of episodes: 26

Production
- Executive producers: Mikael Borglund; Kris Noble
- Producers: Roger Le Mesurier; Roger Simpson; Ros Tatarka
- Production locations: Melbourne, Victoria, Australia
- Running time: 50 minutes
- Production company: Beyond International Group

Original release
- Network: Nine Network
- Release: 30 March 1997 – 23 June 1998

Good Guys, Bad Guys is an Australian comedy/drama TV series that screened on the Nine Network between 1997 and 1998, with a telemovie and twenty-six episodes produced. The crime-themed show was set in Melbourne.

The program and its lead character Elvis Maginnis were written for Marcus Graham, a former star of the soap opera E Street (TV series). Maginnis is disgraced former cop, tainted by his criminal family and framed for corruption. Elvis owns "K for Kleen" drycleaning, managed by Stella Kinsella (Alison Whyte, of the ABC current affairs satire series Frontline) and Reuben Zeus who has Tourette syndrome (Travis McMahon, most recently of Last Man Standing).

Elvis's attempts at a straight life are constantly compromised by the demands of his eccentric family, while Stella's attempts at making "K-for-Kleen" turn a profit are frustrated by Elvis's soft heart.

The program was filmed in Melbourne, predominantly around the inner-city "bohemian" suburbs of St. Kilda, Fitzroy and Carlton. The film style incorporated local colour - Melbourne trams, landmarks like Smith Street's Cobra cane furniture shop, and the Builder's Arms Hotel as Elvis's local - and a soundtrack of the then-latest Australian music, matched to the action. The Good Guys, Bad Guys soundtrack CD features Regurgitator, The Fauves, Nick Cave and the Bad Seeds, The Whitlams, The Avalanches, Spiderbait, The Cruel Sea, Rebecca's Empire and The Mavis's among others.

== Cast ==
=== Main ===
- Marcus Graham as Elvis Maginnis
- Alison Whyte as Stella Kinsella
- Travis McMahon as Reuben Zeus

=== Guests ===
Actor	Role	Ep. count	Ref.
Alan Hopgood	Judge Moody	1	
Alyce Platt	Chrissie McKechnie	1	
Anna Lise Phillips	Emily Costello	1	
Asher Keddie	Aimee	1	
Annie Jones	Veronica Flaherty	1	
Belinda Giblin	Loretta Monk	pilot	
Ben Mendelsohn	Brian O'Malley	1	
Ben Knight	Peter Lubich	1	
Brett Swain	Baxter	2	
Bruce Spence	Squirt Man	1	
Caroline Gillmer	Siobhan Starret	1	
Claudia Black	Jill Mayhew	1	
Chris Haywood	Father Frank Conroy	1	
Damien Fotiou	Johnny Lubich	1	
Denise Scott	Waitress	1	
Dennis Miller	Rufus King	1	
Esben Storm	Jerry	pilot	
Frankie J. Holden	Sgt Brann	1	
Gemma Bishop	Laura	1	
Geoff Paine	Arnold Tilson	1	
Gerald Lepkowski	Tierney	1	
Grant Piro	Gavin 'The Goat' La Rousse	1	
Greg Stone	Sgt. Steve Mason	1	
Hayley McElhinney	Loyola Maginnis-McLeod	1	
Ian Bliss	Keith McLeod	1	
Jack Finsterer	Christie Maginnis	1	
Jane Hall	Allie Andrews	1	
Joseph Spano	Carly	1	
John Flaus	Finbar Maginnis	1	
John O'May	Tyrone O'Keefe	1	
John McTernan	Chief Commissioner Fuller	1	
John Stanton	Rowntree	1	
John Waters	Oscar Drake	1	
Kate Langbroek	Female Detective	1	
Kristian Schmid	Jimmy Costello	1	
Lenita Vangellis	Anna Bitta	pilot	
Lesley Baker	Mrs Pinney	1	
Lewis Fitz-Gerald	Marshall Dobbs	1	
Lisa Hensley	Dorothy O'Malley	1	
Louise Siversen	Shannon Blightie	1	
Magda Szubanski	Bella Bouvier	1	
Mary Coustas	Madonna Kapello	1	
Matthew Newton	Casper Moody	1	
Maya Stange	Orange	1	
Michala Banas	Kirsty	1	
Mike Bishop	Frank Little	1	
Nadine Garner	Jinx	pilot	
Nicholas Bell	Dennis Dreeble	1	
Norman Kaye	Roly Finster	1	
Paul Sonkkila	Hector Stubbs	1	
Peta Brady	Susie Crake	2	
Petra Yared	Taylor	1	
Red Symons	Irate Customer	1	
Robert Mammone	Cosimo	1	
Robert Taylor	Andrew Costello	1	
Roger Oakley	Ron 'Maddog' Morello	1	
Samuel Johnson	Dermott Maginnis	5	
Shane Connor	Bianco	2	
Sonia Todd	Wendy Johnson	1	
Sophie Lee	Amy	pilot	
Stefan Dennis	Andy Caesar	1	
Stephen Curry	Michael MacEvoy	1	
Sue Jones	Fay O'Malley	1	
Sullivan Stapleton	Paul Morello	1	
Tammy MacIntosh	Holly Swift	1	
Tommy Dysart	Athol Amoroso	1	
Tracy Mann	Brenda Wick	1	
Troy Beckwith	Smithy	1	
Val Lehman	Rose Kinsella	1	
Vince Colosimo	Zoran	1	
Wayne Hope	Van Molloy	1	
Zoe Bertram	Det. Sgt. Maxine Hendrix	1	
Zoe Carides	Skye	1	

== Awards ==
In 1997, the show won 'Best Mini-Series or Telefeature' at the AFI Awards. In 1998, cast member Alison Whyte was nominated for 'Most Outstanding Actress' at the Logie Awards for her role in the show.

== International broadcasts ==
In 1997 and 1998, the series was shown on Russian television channels TV Tsentr and Stolitsa.

== Home media ==
In 2007 Force Australia released season one of Good Guys, Bad Guys on DVD. Then Force Australia stopped operating and was taken over by Beyond Home Entertainment who released season two of Good Guys, Bad Guys on DVD in September 2007.

DVD name	Format	Ep #	Discs	Region 4 (Australia)	Special features	Distributors
Good Guys, Bad Guys (Season 01)	DVD	13	4	18 April 2007	None	Force Australia
Good Guys, Bad Guys (Season 02)	DVD	13	4	12 September 2007	None	Beyond Home Entertainment
Good Guys, Bad Guys: The Complete Collection	DVD	26	8	4 September 2013	None	
Good Guys, Bad Guys: The Complete Collection	DVD	26	8	20 April 2016	None	Beyond Home Entertainment
Good Guys, Bad Guys: The Complete Series	DVD	26	8	15 September 2021	None	Via Vision Entertainment

== See also ==
- List of Australian television series
