= Marcus Graham =

Australian actor

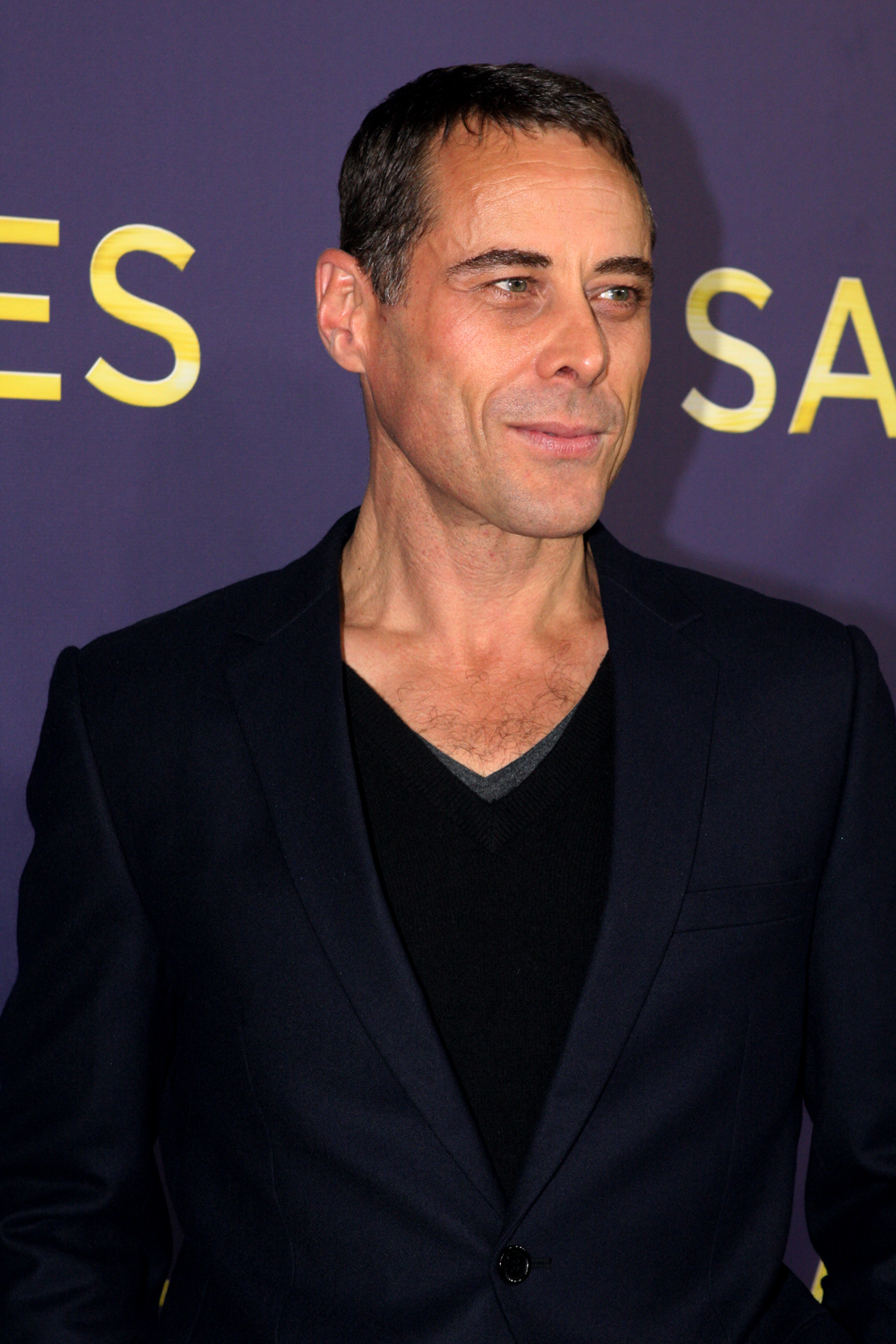
- Born: Perth, Western Australia, Australia
- Occupation: Actor
- Years active: 1986–present
- Family: Ron Graham (father)
- Awards: AACTA Award for Best Guest or Supporting Actor in a Television Drama

Marcus Graham is an Australian film, television and stage actor, writer and director, with roles including Mulholland Drive and Josh Jarman. He was known as a teenage heartthrob in the early 1990s while starring in the Australian TV soap E Street as the character Stanley 'Wheels' Kovac. He is also known for his role as Harvey Ryan in Home and Away.

== Early life and education ==
Marcus Graham was born in Perth, Western Australia, the son of English-Australian actor Ron Graham and Judy, a ballerina with the West Australian Ballet Company. His parents had separated by the time he was two.

He graduated from the Western Australian Academy of Performing Arts in 1983, before making his professional acting debut in 1986.

== Career ==
Graham has worked extensively in Australian television, first achieving success in the early '90s as Stanley 'Wheels' Kovac in E Street. He went on to star as the lead in Good Guys, Bad Guys and also appeared in All Saints, Shadows of the Heart, The Secret Life of Us, the ABC comedy Stupid, Stupid Man, and the American drama series Charmed.

Graham played the regular role of Harvey Ryan in the Channel 7 series Home and Away, and Pav in Season 1 of Australian drama The Heights. He has played Melbourne underworld figures in two Australian television dramas – Alan Williams in 1995's Blue Murder, and Lewis Caine in 2008's Underbelly.

2006 saw him win an Australian Film Institute award for a guest role on the Channel 7 drama Blue Heelers.

Graham has also worked extensively in theatre throughout his career. Notable stage credits include The Rocky Horror Show (as Frank N Furter), Les Liaisons Dangereuses, Pericles, Twelve Angry Men, Othello, Oedipus the King, Macbeth and Hedda Gabler. He won a Mo Award for his starring role in The Blue Room opposite Sigrid Thornton.

In 2019, Graham formed Ai Films Studio, for which (together with a business partner), he writes, directs and produces. His documentary feature Dream Big Little One has garnered awards at many international film festivals.

== Filmography ==
=== Film ===
Year	Title	Role	Notes
1987	Dangerous Game	Jack	Feature film
1992	Mad Bomber in Love	Franklin	Feature film
1993	A Divinity of Sorts	Rock Manager	Short film
1993	Ratbag Hero	Uncredited	TV film
1993	Crimetime		Feature film
1994	Point of No Return	Grady / Christian	TV series
1997	The Last Embrace	Bartender	
1997	Good Guys, Bad Guys: Only the Young Die Good	Elvis Maginnis	TV film
1998	Justice	Bobby Lewis	Feature film
1998	Three Chords and a Wardrobe	Nick	Short film
1999	Secret Men's Business	Michael Schofield	TV film
2000	Mulholland Drive	Mr. Darby	Feature film
2000	Green Sails	Will Patterson	TV film
2001	Nicolas	Nicolas	Feature film
2003	Horseplay	Max MacKendrick	Feature film
2004	Roll	Alex	TV film
2004	Josh Jarman	Josh Jarman	Feature film
2004	Cool	Stephen	Short fim
2007	Spike Up	Tolly Manditis	Short film
2007	Blackjack: Ghosts	Harry Searle	TV film
2008	Three Blind Mice	John	Feature film
2008	Burley!	Ricko (voice)	Short film
2009	Clearing the Air	Dad	Short film
2011	Snobs	Therapist	TV film
2011	Blockhouse Blues and the Elmore Beast	Jimmy Twice	Feature film
2012	The Last Match	Barry Bluster	Short film
2013	Worm	Uncle Craig	Short film
2015	Holding the Man	Doctor Sam	Feature film
2015	Off Record	Michael	Short film
2016	Woman with an Editing Bench	Boris Shumyatsky	Short film
2016	Cold Hearts	Convict	Short film
2017	Rip Tide	Farriet	Feature film
2019	Calliope's Prelude		Short film
2021	This Should be Banned	Barry	Short film
2022	These Futures Are Not Inevitable	John	Video
TBA	Myall Creek Day of Justice	George Gipps	In production

=== Television ===
Year	Title	Role	Notes
1986	A Fortunate Life		Miniseries, 1 episode
1990	Shadows of the Heart	Vic Hanlon	Miniseries, 2 episodes
1990	The Flying Doctors	Ted Paterson	TV series, 1 episode
1991	Chances	Alex Taylor	TV series, 1 episode
1991	G.P.	Sean Bracey	TV series, 2 episodes
1989–93	E Street	Stanley "Wheels" Kovac	TV series, 108 episodes
1994	The Battlers	The Busker	Miniseries
1994	Halifax f.p.	Vinnie Geralitis	TV series, 1 episode
1995	Blue Murder	Allan Williams	TV series, 2 episodes
1997–98	Good Guys, Bad Guys	Elvis Maginnis	TV series, 26 episodes
1998	Sins of the City	Vince Karol	TV series, 3 episodes
2000	Charmed	Dragon Warlock	TV series, season 2, episode 22: "Be Careful What You Witch For"
	All Saints		TV series
	The Secret Life of Us		TV series
2006	Blue Heelers	Pilgrim Bond	TV series, 1 episode
2007	Stupid, Stupid Man	James	TV series, 1 episode
2007	Game Head	Self	TV series, 2 episodes
2007–08	Championship Gaming Series North American League	Host	TV series, 8 episodes
2008	CGS Live	Host	TV series, 1 episode
2008	Time Trackers	Kevin	TV series, 3 episodes
2008	Underbelly	Lewis Caine	TV series, 5 episodes
2011	Laid	Telly	TV series, 2 episodes
2011	City Homicide	Michael Lombardi	TV series, 4 episodes
2011	SLiDE	Patrick	TV series, 1 episode
2011	Crownies	Danny Novak	TV series, 4 episodes
2011–14	Home and Away	Harvey Ryan	Regular role, 228 episodes
2014	Janet King	Danny Novak	TV series, 2 episodes
2015	Hiding	Nils Vadenberg	TV series, 8 episodes
2016–21	Jack Irish	Rob Shand	TV series, 4 episodes
2017	House of Bond	Michael Williams	Miniseries, 2 episodes
2017	Cleverman	Stephen McIntyre	TV series, 11 episodes
2018	Picnic at Hanging Rock	Tomasetti	Miniseries, 6 episodes
2019	Secret City	Andrew Griffiths	TV series, 12 episodes
2019	Reef Break	Dax	TV series, 1 episode
2019	The Heights	Pav	TV series, season 1, 30 episodes
2021	Lost for Words	Seif	Miniseries
2025	Darby and Joan	Dermot Lincoln	TV series: 1 episode
2025	Ten Pound Poms	Benny Bates	TV series: 5 episodes
TBA	Zombie Therapy		TV series, in production

=== Writing/directing ===
Year	Title	Role	Notes
1997	The Plastic Gangster	Writer / director	Short film
2018	Parked	Director	Short film
2021	This Should Be Banned!	Writer / director	Short film
2021	Dream Big Little One	Writer / director / producer	Documentary film
2023	Digital Skin	Writer / director / producer	Short film
2023	I Am	Writer / producer	
TBA	FiveK Radius	Director / producer	Feature film, in production
TBA	The McKenzie Sunshine Show	Director / producer	Kids TV series, in development

== Theatre ==
=== As actor ===
Year	Title	Role	Notes
1987	Biloxi Blues		Suncorp Theatre, Brisbane
1987	The Rivers of China	Wayne Shute	The Wharf Theatre
1988	The Heartbreak Kid		Cremorne Theatre & Stables Theatre, Sydney
1989	A Midsummer Night's Dream		Sydney Opera House
1990 / 1992	Love Letters	Andrew Makepeace Ladd III	Sydney Opera House
1991	Henry IV, Part 1		Sydney Olympic Park & Blackfriars Theatre, Sydney
1992	Antony and Cleopatra		Blackfriars Theatre, Sydney
1992	The Rocky Horror Show	Frank-N-Furter	Her Majesty's Theatre, Adelaide
1993	Tourmaline		Black Swan Theatre Company for Perth Festival at PICA
1993	The Shaughraun	Conn the Shaughraun	Suncorp Theatre, Brisbane
1994	A Midsummer Night's Dream	Demetrius	Royal Botanic Garden, Sydney
1995	The Shaughraun	Conn the Shaughraun	Playhouse, Melbourne & Sydney Opera House
1995	Who's Afraid of Virginia Woolf?		Glen Street Theatre
1995	American Buffalo		Seymour Centre
1996	The Rocky Horror Show	Frank-N-Furter	Lyric Theatre & Newcastle Civic Theatre
1996	The Tragedy of Julius Caesar	Brutus	Playhouse, Melbourne
2001	Three Days of Rain		Sydney Theatre Company
2001	The Seagull		Playhouse, Melbourne
2001	The White Devil	Brachiano	Sydney Theatre Company at Brooklyn Academy of Music
2002	The Glass Menagerie		Sydney Theatre Company
2003	Les Liaisons Dangereuses	Le Vicomte de Valmont	Playhouse, Melbourne
2002–04	The Blue Room		Melbourne Theatre Company, Theatre Royal, Sydney, His Majesty's Theatre, Perth & Lyric Theatre
2004	A Number		Brisbane Powerhouse & Space Theatre, Adelaide
2004–05	Twelve Angry Men	Juror 8	Arts Project Australia & Adrian Bohm at QPAC, Sydney Theatre & Melbourne Athenaeum
2005	Zastrozzi, The Master of Discipline	Zastrozzi	Black Swan Theatre Company for Perth Festival
2005	Oedipus The King	Oedipus	Playhouse, QPAC
2005	Love Letters	Andrew Makepeace Ladd III	Parade Theatre
2006	It Just Stopped		Malthouse Theatre
2007	Othello	Iago	Orange Civic Theatre, Sydney Opera House, Playhouse, Melbourne & The Playhouse, Civic Square
2007	Moliere's Tartuffe	Tartuffe	Malthouse Theatre
2008	The 39 Steps	Richard Hannay	Geelong Performing Arts Centre & Playhouse, Melbourne
2009	Secret Bridesmaid's Business	Guest Groom	Playhouse, Melbourne
2009	Jerry Springer: The Opera	Special Guest Star	Sydney Opera House
2009	Pericles	Pericles	Bell Shakespeare Company at Playhouse, Melbourne & Sydney Opera House
2009	God of Carnage	Alan Reille	Sydney Opera House
2009	Julius Caesar		Wharf Theatre
2010	That Face	Hugh	Belvoir St Theatre
2010	Macbeth	Macbeth	Queensland Theatre Company, QUT Festival Theatre, Powerhouse for Brisbane Festival
2011	The Fastest Clock in the Universe	Host/Reader	Chapel Off Chapel
2013	The Bebop Apocalypse		Seriousboys & 107 Projects at Darlinghurst Theatre
2013	Angels in America	Roy Cohn	Belvoir St Theatre & Theatre Royal
2014	Noises Off	Lloyd Dallas	Sydney Opera House
2014	Hedda Gabler	Judge Brack	Belvoir St Theatre
2014	Emerald City	Mike	Griffin Theatre Company at SBW Stables Theatre
2017	Cabaret	Ernst Ludwig	The Kit Kat Club at Hayes Theatre Co & Melbourne Athenaeum

=== As director ===
Year	Title	Role	Notes
2004	Greek	Director	Punk's Palace Theatre at Brisbane Powerhouse
2013	Glengarry Glen Ross	Director	Serious Boys Theatre at Darlinghurst Theatre
2013	The Bebop Apocalypse	Director	Seriousboys & 107 Projects at Darlinghurst Theatre

== Awards and nominations ==
=== As actor ===
Year	Award	Category	Nominated work	Result
1990	Logie Awards	Most Popular New Talent	E Street	Nominated
1992	Logie Awards	Most Popular Actor	E Street	Nominated
1997	Australian Film Institute Awards	Best Lead Actor in Television Drama	Good Guys, Bad Guys	Nominated
2003	Mo Awards	Best Male Actor in a Play	The Blue Room	Won
2005	Matilda Awards	Interactive Theatre Australia Award for Best Performance by a Male Actor in a Lead Role	Oedipus the King	Nominated
2006	Helpmann Awards	Best Male Actor in a Play	Oedipus the King	Nominated
2006	Australian Film Institute Awards	Best Guest or Supporting Actor in a Television Drama	Blue Heelers	Won
2013	Sydney Theatre Awards	Best Actor in a Supporting Role in a Mainstage Production	Angels in America	Nominated
2014	Sydney Theatre Awards	Best Actor in a Supporting Role in a Mainstage Production	Hedda Gabler	Nominated
2014	The Equity Awards	Outstanding Performance by an Ensemble in a Drama Series	Home and Away	Nominated
2019	The Equity Awards	Outstanding Performance by an Ensemble in a Miniseries	Picnic at Hanging Rock	Nominated

=== As filmmaker ===
Year	Award	Category	Nominated work	Result
2021	New York International Film Awards	Best Documentary Feature – Grand Jury Prize	Dream Big Little One	Won
2021	ONIROS Film Awards		Dream Big Little One	Won
2021	The Southern California International Film Festival	Best Director	Dream Big Little One	Won
2021	The Southern California International Film Festival	Best Feature Film	Dream Big Little One	Won
2021	The Southern California International Film Festival	Best Documentary	Dream Big Little One	Won
2021	New York Movie Awards	Best Documentary	Dream Big Little One	Nominated
2021	Madcap Comedy International Short Film Festival	Best Script	This Should Be Banned!	Won
