= A Slow Night at the Kuwaiti Cafe =

Slow Night at the Kuwaiti Cafe
- Directed by: Marc Gracie
- Written by: Chris Thompson; Marc Gracie
- Produced by: Frank Howson
- Starring: Michael Bishop; Tirel Mora; Fiona Corke; Tanya Lacey
- Production company: Boulevard Films
- Release date: 1992
- Running time: 85 mins
- Country: Australia
- Language: English

A Slow Night at the Kuwaiti Cafe is a 1992 Australian film directed by Marc Gracie. It was not theatrically released.

== Premise ==
A Vietnam veteran takes over the small Kuwaiti Cafe in downtown Melbourne and holds the manager hostage in a countdown to prevent the Gulf War.

== Cast ==
- Tiriel Mora as Rashid
- Mike Bishop
- Fiona Corke
- Tania Lacy as Bathsheba
