= Markella Kavenagh =

Australian actor

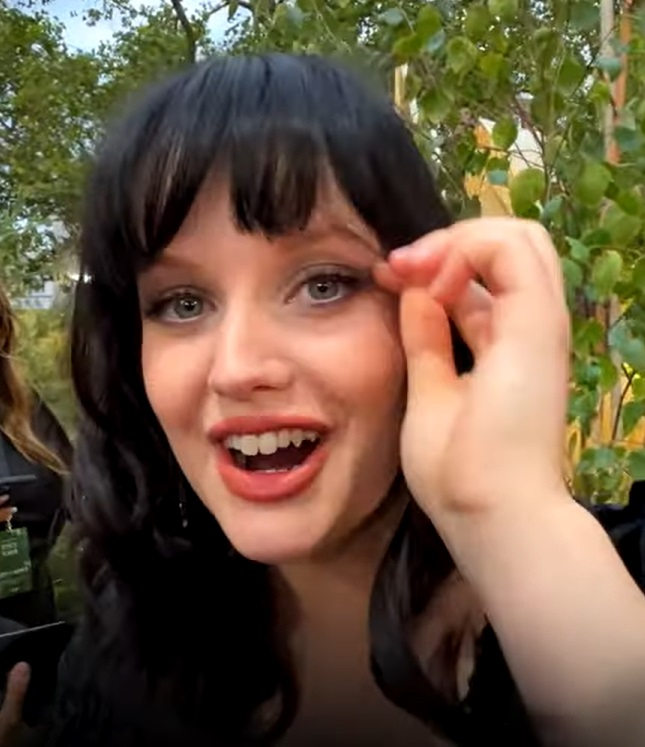
- Markella Kavenagh at World Premiere London, The Rings of Power 2022.
- Born: 30 January 2000 (age 26); Australia
- Occupation: Actress
- Years active: 2018–present

Markella Kavenagh (born 2000) is an Australian actress. Her credits include Picnic at Hanging Rock (2018), Romper Stomper (2018), The Cry (2018), True History of the Kelly Gang (2019), My First Summer, and The Gloaming (2020). However, her most notable work to date is for her starring role as the harfoot Nori Brandyfoot in two seasons of The Lord of the Rings: The Rings of Power (2022–present).

== Career ==
In 2018, Kavenagh played Myrtle, working alongside Natalie Dormer and Samara Weaving in the Australian mystery series Picnic at Hanging Rock (2018), and starred as Cindi in six episodes of Romper Stomper. The same year she appeared as Chloe alongside Jenna Coleman in The Cry (2018), then landed her first film role as Jane Cotter in True History of the Kelly Gang (2019).

In 2020, she appeared as Claudia in My First Summer, and as Daisy Hart for 8 episodes of The Gloaming (2020). She was cast early on as Elanor "Nori" Brandyfoot in Amazon Prime Video series The Lord of the Rings: The Rings of Power (2022–2024), becoming the first actress to be attached in the high-profile project. She plays the Harfoot daughter of the Brandyfoots, working alongside Lenny Henry and Morfydd Clark.

== Filmography ==
=== Film ===
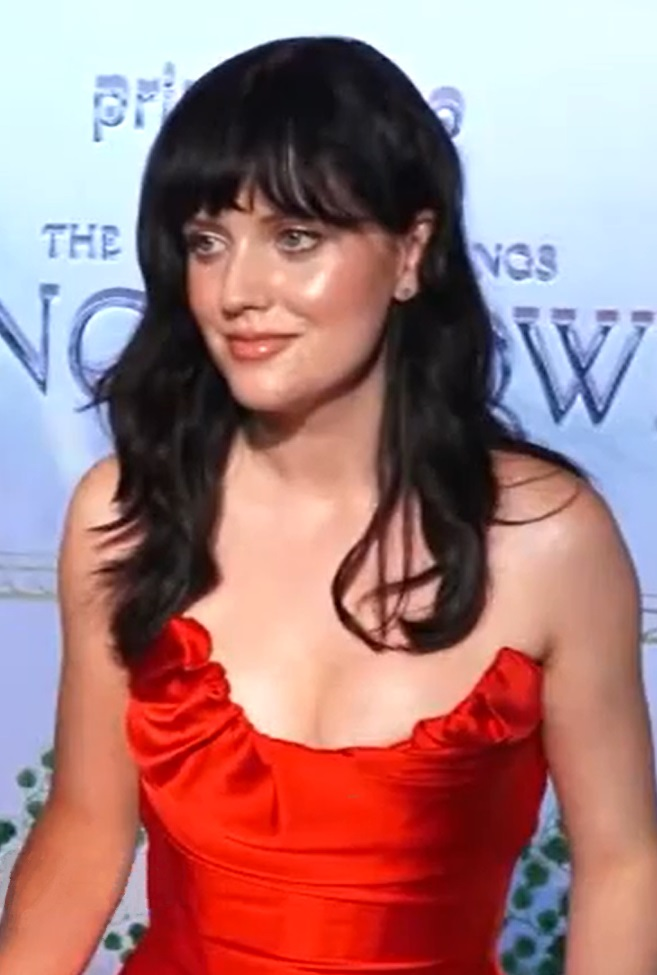
Markella Kavenagh LotR-TRoP Asia Premiere 2022

Year	Title	Role	Notes
2019	True History of the Kelly Gang	Jane Cotter	
2020	My First Summer	Claudia	
2020	Furlough	Sara	Short film
2025	100 Nights of Hero	Mrs. A	
TBA	Watch Dogs	TBA	

=== Television ===
Year	Title	Role	Notes
2018	Romper Stomper	Cindi	6 episodes
2018	Picnic at Hanging Rock	Myrtle	6 episodes
2018	The Cry	Chloe	4 episodes
2019	My Life Is Murder	Cassie Malone	1 episode
2020	The Gloaming	Daisy Hart	8 episodes
2022–present	The Lord of the Rings: The Rings of Power	Elanor "Nori" Brandyfoot	16 episodes
2023	Bad Behaviour	Portia	4 episodes
