= Maiah Stewardson =

Australian actress, speaker and activist (born 1998)

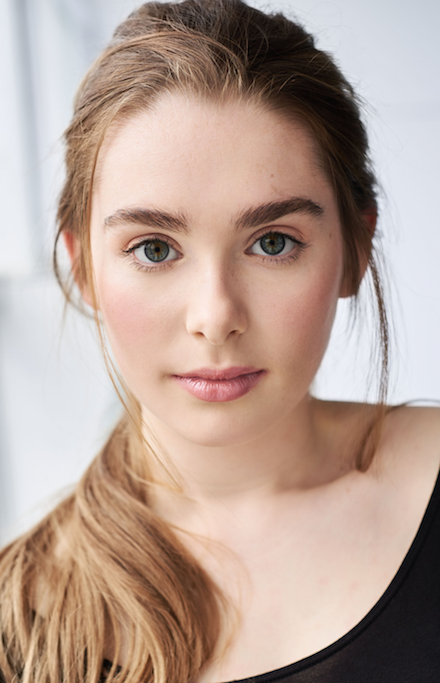
- Stewardson in 2021
- Born: June 6, 1998 (age 28)
- Occupation: Actor
- Years active: 2009-present

Maiah Stewardson (born 6 June 1998) is an Australian actor, activist, writer and podcaster.

== Career ==
Stewardson began acting classes when she was seven.

At age 16, Stewardson played Jade in Windmill Theatre Company’s production of Girl Asleep. She reprised the role in the 2015 film adaptation of the same name.

Stewardson has trained with 16th Street Studio, Howard Fine and Larry Moss. She won the Emerging Artist of the Year award from the Adelaide Critic Circle for her work on A View from the Bridge.

== Personal life ==
She came out as bisexual in her year 12 and faced internalized biphobia. Stewardson is also queer.

== Acting credits ==
Year	Title	Role	Notes	Ref.
2015	Girl Asleep	Jade	Feature film	
2019	The InBESTigators	Claudia	Television series; 1 episode	
2020	My First Summer	Grace	Feature film	
2020	Unresolved Case: File.08, JFK Assassination	Marina Oswald	Television film	
2021	Possum	Lucy	Short	
2022	First Day	Sam	Television series; 3 episodes	
2023	Fantasy		Short film	
2025	The Knight	N/A	Short; writer	

=== Theatre ===
Year	Show	Role	Notes	Ref
2009	The Reading		With Urban Myth Theatre	
2012	The Visitors	Chloe	With Urban Myth Theatre	
2012	Fame		School production	
2014	Bye Bye Birdie		School production	
2016	Hedda Gabler	Hedda		
2018	Amphibian	Chloe	With Windmill Theatre Company	
2019	A View from the Bridge	Catherine	With the State Theatre Company of South Australia	
2019/20	Emily Loves to Bounce		With Patch Theatre Company	

=== Podcasts ===
Year	Podcast name	Role	Notes	Ref
	Social Distance Podcast	Host	Started early in the COVID-19 pandemic	
	You Make Me Queer	Guest		

== Awards and nominations ==
Year	Award	Category	Nominated work	Result	Ref
2019	Adelaide Critic Circle Awards	Emerging Artist of the Year	Catherine in A View from the Bridge	Won	
2025	South Australian Screen Awards	Best Screenplay sponsored by Australian Writers Guild SA	The Knight – Lotte Sweeney & Maiah Stewardson	Won	
