= You and Your Stupid Mate =

- DVD cover
- Directed by: Marc Gracie
- Written by: Dave O'Neil; Mark O'Toole
- Produced by: Marc Gracie; David Redman
- Starring: Nathan Phillips; Angus Sampson
- Cinematography: Justin Brickle
- Edited by: Michael Collins
- Music by: Craig Bryant; Yuri Worontschak
- Release date: 2005
- Running time: 85 minutes
- Country: Australia
- Language: English
- Box office: A$688,491 (Australia)

You and Your Stupid Mate is a 2005 Australian comedy film directed by Marc Gracie and starring Nathan Phillips and Angus Sampson.

== Premise ==
Two best friends who live together in a caravan park discover that their favourite soap opera is about to be cancelled. They go on a quest to save the show.

== Cast ==
- Nathan Phillips as Philip
- Angus Sampson as Jeffrey
- Rachel Hunter as Karen
- Madeleine West as Emma
- Reg Gorman as Stan
- William McInnes as Peter Rossiter
- Brett Swain as Supervisor

== Production ==
The film was one of several comedies with investment from the Macquarie Film Corporation.

== Reception ==
The film was universally panned.

You and Your Stupid Mate grossed $688,491 at the box office in Australia.

== See also ==
- Cinema of Australia
