= The Family Law =

Australian TV comedy series

- Genre: Sitcom; Comedy drama
- Created by: Benjamin Law
- Based on: The Family Law by Benjamin Law
- Written by: Benjamin Law; Marieke Hardy; Kirsty Fisher; Lawrence Leung
- Directed by: Jonathan Brough; Ben Chessell; Sophie Miller
- Starring: Trystan Go; Fiona Choi; Anthony Brandon Wong; Shuang Hu; George Zhao; Karina Lee; Vivian Wei; Bethany Whitmore
- Composer: Joff Bush
- Country of origin: Australia
- Original language: English
- No. of series: 3
- No. of episodes: 18

Production
- Executive producers: Tony Ayres (series 1–2); Debbie Lee
- Producers: Julie Eckersley; Sophie Miller
- Cinematography: Eric Murray Lui
- Camera setup: Multi-camera
- Running time: 22–23 minutes
- Production company: Matchbox Pictures

Original release
- Network: SBS
- Release: 14 January 2016 – 12 January 2019

The Family Law is an Australian comedy television program created by Benjamin Law. The six-part series, loosely adapted from Law's 2010 book of the same name, was written by Law and Marieke Hardy. The series was produced by Matchbox Pictures and screened on SBS from 14 January 2016. A second season of the show premiered on 15 June 2017. The third and final season of the show aired on 12 January 2019. The show streams on Hulu in the US.

== Plot ==
The series follows the dysfunctional world of a Chinese-Australian family through the eyes of 14-year-old Benjamin Law. It is set on the Sunshine Coast, Queensland, but filmed in Sunnybank Brisbane, over a long, hot summer the family will never forget. The family consists of Benjamin Law, eldest sister Candy, older brother Andrew, younger sisters Tammy and Michelle and parents Jenny and Danny.

== Cast ==
=== Main ===
- Trystan Go as Benjamin Law
- Fiona Choi as Jenny Law
- Anthony Brandon Wong as Danny Law
- Shuang Hu as Candy Law
- George Zhao as Andrew Law
- Karina Lee as Tammy Law
- Vivian Wei as Michelle Law
- Bethany Whitmore as Melissa Hills, Benjamin's friend

=== Recurring ===
- Diana Lin as Maisy, Jenny's acquaintance
- Erika Heynatz as Diane
- Jeremy Lindsay Taylor as Pete
- Kimie Tsukakoshi as Heidi Thomson
- Loretta Kung as Daisy, Jenny's acquaintance
- Sam Cotton as Wayne, Candy's boyfriend
- Takaya Honda as Klaus Thomson

=== Guests ===
- Genevieve Morris as Lorraine
- Julie Eckersley as Bratwurst Woman / Customer 1 / Waitress
- Ling-Hsueh Tang as Aunty Rose
- Todd MacDonald as Ross

== Episodes ==
=== Series 1 (2016) ===
No. overall	No. in season	Title	Directed by	Written by	Original release date
1	1	"Queensland's Got Talent"	Jonathan Brough	Benjamin Law	14 January 2016
2	2	"Tra-la-la-la-Law"	Jonathan Brough	Benjamin Law	21 January 2016
3	3	"Asians Gone Wild"	Jonathan Brough	Benjamin Law	28 January 2016
4	4	"Birthday Bash"	Jonathan Brough	Benjamin Law & Marieke Hardy	4 February 2016
5	5	"Everything's Coming Up Roses"	Jonathan Brough	Benjamin Law & Marieke Hardy	11 February 2016
6	6	"Love Is in the Air"	Jonathan Brough	Benjamin Law & Marieke Hardy	18 February 2016

=== Series 2 (2017) ===
No. overall	No. in season	Title	Directed by	Written by	Original release date
7	1	"New Beginnings"	Ben Chessell	Benjamin Law & Kirsty Fisher	15 June 2017
Danny opens a new Chinese grocery store and shows off this new modern apartment. Tension rises as Jenny tries to find herself in a new post-divorce world. Meanwhile Benjamin fights it out for middle school captain with his good-looking archnemesis Klaus.
8	2	"Help Yourself"	Ben Chessell	Benjamin Law & Kirsty Fisher	15 June 2017
Tension rises as Jenny's journey of self-discovery is belittled by people around her. She decides to change back to her maiden name. Benjamin fights it out for the lead role in a Greek tragedy school play.
9	3	"Adult Education"	Ben Chessell	Lawrence Leung	22 June 2017
10	4	"The Family Kerr"	Sophie Miller	Benjamin Law & Kirsty Fisher	6 July 2017
11	5	"Money, Money, Money"	Ben Chessell	Benjamin Law & Kirsty Fisher	13 July 2017
12	6	"Matters of the Heart"	Ben Chessell	Benjamin Law	20 July 2017

=== Series 3 (2019) ===
No. overall	No. in season	Title	Directed by	Written by	Original release date
13	1	"Ready for This"	Ben Chessell	Benjamin Law & Kirsty Fisher	12 January 2019
14	2	"Close Encounters of the Male Kind"	Ben Chessell	Benjamin Law & Kirsty Fisher	12 January 2019
15	3	"Painfully Camp"	Ben Chessell	Benjamin Law & Kirsty Fisher	12 January 2019
16	4	"Dancing in the Dark"	Ben Chessell	Benjamin Law & Kirsty Fisher	12 January 2019
17	5	"Panic Stations"	Ben Chessell	Benjamin Law & Kirsty Fisher	12 January 2019
18	6	"Number One Gay Son"	Sophie Miller	Benjamin Law & Kirsty Fisher	12 January 2019
Jenny and Pete get back together. Ben becomes convinced that Jenny won't accept him being gay, leading to tension and fighting between them. After Candy reminds him how supportive Jenny has always been of him, Ben comes out to Jenny and she is immediately accepting and supporting of him. He comes out to the rest of his family, who are similarly supportive. His family's support inspires Ben to update his talent show act with Melissa to a flamboyant performance of It's Raining Men, which wins the show.

== Reception and ratings ==
During the run of its first series The Family Law averaged a national audience of 417,000. It was also the highest viewed program on SBS On Demand throughout the series.

The program attracted an audience of 1.1 million views for its exclusive Facebook premiere of its first episode days before it aired on television.

== Critical reception ==
The program has received positive reviews from critics.

One critic from Daily Review Australia said "the core challenge is making a captivating comedy series about normal people living normal lives. The Family Law gives it a good crack, and has an amiable quality that many viewers will find endearing."

Another critic from The Guardian said "there’s so much detail, warmth and gentle humour to the script, direction and production design that the characters and settings are relatable for anyone who grew up – or is growing up – in Australia." She gave the program 4 out of 5 stars.

== Awards and accolades ==
Awards and accolades for The Family Law
Year	Award	Category	Nominee(s)	Result
2016	6th AACTA Awards	AACTA Award for Best Television Comedy Series	The Family Law	Nominated
2016	6th AACTA Awards	AACTA Award for Best Comedy Performance	Fiona Choi	Nominated
2017	Australian Directors Guild Awards	Best Direction in a TV or SVOD Comedy Program	Jonathan Brough (episode: "Queensland's Got Talent")	Nominated
