= Girl Asleep (film) =

- Australian release poster
- Directed by: Rosemary Myers
- Screenplay by: Matthew Whittet
- Based on: Girl Asleep (play) by Matthew Whittet
- Produced by: Jo Dyer
- Starring: Bethany Whitmore; Harrison Feldman; Imogen Archer; Tilda Cobham-Hervey; Eamon Farren; Matthew Whittet; Amber McMahon; Maiah Stewardson
- Cinematography: Andrew Commis ACS
- Edited by: Karryn de Cinque
- Music by: Luke Smiles; Harry Covill
- Distributed by: Kojo Group
- Release date: 20 October 2015 (Adelaide Film Festival)
- Running time: 77 minutes
- Country: Australia
- Language: English
- Budget: AU$1.5 million
- Box office: $211,637

Girl Asleep is a 2015 Australian surrealist coming-of-age drama film written by Matthew Whittet and directed by Rosemary Myers. The film has been described as an extroverted fantasy dreamscape of an introverted teenage girl. The film is an adaptation of the successful theatre production, also written by Matthew Whittet, by Windmill Theatre in 2014 of the same name, that premiered at the Adelaide Festival. The cast includes: Bethany Whitmore, Tilda Cobham-Hervey, Imogen Archer, Harrison Feldman, Amber McMahon, Eamon Farren, scriptwriter Matthew Whittet and Maiah Stewardson.

Girl Asleep showed at the 2016 Berlin International Film Festival to critical acclaim, and garnered the top prize at CinefestOZ, the richest film prize in Australia.

== Plot ==
In the late 1970s, 14-year old Greta Driscoll arrives at a new school. She is immediately befriended by the overenthusiastic Elliott, whom she likes, and is also approached by a group of sophisticated girls, Jade, Sapphire and Amber, who pressure her into friendship even though she doesn't like them.

Greta's mother worries that she has no friends and decides to invite her whole school to her fifteenth birthday party. Though Greta is extremely opposed to the idea, she eventually allows her mother to proceed with her plan. The day of the party Greta is surprised to find herself having fun but is yanked away from the party by Amber and her friends who give her a song they have recorded where they mock her body. Running away crying Greta is approached by Elliott who confesses he has a crush on her. Greta cruelly shuts him down.

Shortly afterwards Greta notices a strange creature in her room who has stolen her music box. Chasing it, she finds herself lured into the forest behind her house where menacing creatures lurk. As she is about to be attacked she meets the Huldra who rescues her. After being separated from the Huldra, Greta tries to find her music box and is instead frozen by a woman smashing various music boxes. She is once again rescued by the Huldra who throws her back into her world. After fighting off evil versions of Amber, Jade and Sapphire, Greta finds the creature who stole her music box and discovers the creature is actually her child self.

Awakening in her bedroom, Greta is met by her older sister who comforts her and tells her that while her current age is an awkward one she is not alone. Greta returns to the party where she apologises to Elliott and she asks him to switch clothes so that she can abandon the uncomfortable dress her mother forced her to wear. Decked out in Elliot's suit, Greta blows out her candles and celebrates her 15th birthday.

== Cast ==
- Bethany Whitmore as Greta
- Harrison Feldman as Elliott
- Imogen Archer as Genevieve
- Tilda Cobham-Hervey as The Huldra
- Eamon Farren as Adam / Benoit Tremet
- Matthew Whittet as Conrad / Abject Man
- Amber McMahon as Janet / Frozen Woman
- Maiah Stewardson as Jade
- Fiona Dawson as Sapphire
- Grace Dawson as Amber
- Lucy Cowan as Little Greta
- Ellen Steele as Miss Shiswick
- Danielle Catanzariti as Denise Mackel

== Production ==
The film received funding from Windmill Theatre, South Australian Film Corporation, The Ian Potter Foundation and The Hive Production Fund, a unique initiative of the Adelaide Film Festival in partnership with the Australia Council for the Arts, Screen Australia and ABC Arts.

The film was primarily shot in Adelaide, South Australia, with most of the interior and forest shots filmed at Anomaly Studios. Other locations include Findon High School, Blackwood Forest, Bonython Park and a private house in the suburb of Panorama.

== Reception ==
=== Critical response ===
On the review aggregator website Rotten Tomatoes, 82% of 38 critics' reviews are positive, with an average rating of 6.70/10. The website's consensus reads: "Girl Asleep takes a singularly quirky look at adolescence with a distinctive visual style and a refreshing perspective that belies the story's period setting." According to Metacritic, which compiled 12 reviews and calculated a weighted average score of 67 out of 100, the film received "generally favorable reviews".

Jane Howard of The Guardian praises the film giving it 4 out of 5 stars and said that "It’s remarkable how comfortable the oddities we might associate with theatre sit on the screen". and further stating "The rich colours popping from cinematographer Andrew Commis’s 4:3 aspect ratio draw us back into an Australia of the past. Production and costume designer Jonathon Oxlade also embraces the 70s in all of its oddities and excess. And yet Myers always grounds her characters and their stories in a recognisable reality, drawing out delicate and nuanced performances. Even when the fantasy and magic reaches a peak, we still feel passionately engaged with the humanity." Simon Foster of Screen-Space gave the film 4.5 out of 5 stars and said "As Greta embraces her blossoming self, so to does Australian cinema welcome another memorable movie heroine." Cat Kusmuk-Dodd of The Upside News states "Both Greta’s journey through her everyday life and into her imaginary world make for a visually pleasing experience, the latter enchanting us with the appearance of creatures similar to those in The Mighty Boosh. The excessive timber décor and brightly coloured wallpaper in the Driscoll’s family home would not seem out of place in Napoleon Dynamite."

=== Accolades ===
Award	Category	Subject	Result
Adelaide Film Festival	Audience Award for Most Popular Feature	Rosemary Myers	Won
Adelaide Film Festival	Audience Award for Most Popular Feature	Jo Dyer	Won
AACTA Awards (6th)	Best Film	Jo Dyer	Nominated
AACTA Awards (6th)	Best Direction	Rosemary Meyers	Nominated
AACTA Awards (6th)	Best Adapted Screenplay	Matthew Whittet	Nominated
AACTA Awards (6th)	Best Cinematography	Andrew Commis	Nominated
AACTA Awards (6th)	Best Editing	Karryn de Cinque	Nominated
AACTA Awards (6th)	Best Production Design	Jonathon Oxlade	Nominated
AACTA Awards (6th)	Best Costume Design	Jonathon Oxlade	Won
AFCA Awards	Best Film	Jo Dyer	Won
AFCA Awards	Best Director	Rosemary Meyers	Nominated
AFCA Awards	Best Screenplay	Matthew Whittet	Nominated
AFCA Awards	Best Actress	Bethany Whitmore	Nominated
AFCA Awards	Best Supporting Actor	Harrison Feldman	Nominated
AFCA Awards	Best Supporting Actress	Amber McMahon	Nominated
ASE Award	Best Editing in a Feature Film	Karryn de Cinque	Nominated
BAFICI Film Festival	Best Film	Rosemary Myers	Nominated
Berlin International Film Festival	Crystal Bear for Best Feature Film	Rosemary Myers	Nominated
CinefestOZ	Best Film		Won
FCCA Award	Best Film	Jo Dyer	Nominated
Melbourne International Film Festival	Age Critics Prize for Best Australian Feature Film	Jo Dyer	Won
Melbourne International Film Festival	Age Critics Prize for Best Australian Feature Film	Rosemary Meyers	Won
Neuchâtel International Fantastic Film Festival	Best Film	Rosemary Meyers	Nominated
Seattle International Film Festival	Grand Jury Prize	Rosemary Meyers	Won
Seattle International Film Festival	Grand Jury Prize	Jo Dyer	Won
Seattle International Film Festival	Futurewave Youth Jury Award	Jo Dyer	Won
Seattle International Film Festival	Futurewave Youth Jury Award	Rosemary Meyers	Won

== See also ==
- Cinema of Australia
