= Benjamin Law (writer) =

Australian writer

- Born: Nambour, Queensland, Australia
- Occupations: Author, screenwriter, journalist
- Relatives: Michelle Law (sister)
- Writing career
- Period: 2000s–present
- Notable works: The Family Law, Gaysia
- Website: benjamin-law.com

Benjamin Law (born c.1982) is an Australian author, screenwriter and journalist. He is best known for his books The Family Law, a family memoir published in 2010, and the TV series of the same name. He hosts the radio programme and podcast Stop Everything! for ABC Radio National.

== Early life and education ==
Born in around 1982 Nambour, Queensland, to immigrant parents from Hong Kong and Malaysia, He was educated at Immanuel Lutheran College on the Sunshine Coast. He has a PhD in creative writing and cultural studies from the Queensland University of Technology (QUT).

He is gay.

== Career ==
The Family Law is a family memoir published in 2010. It was a shortlisted nominee for Book of the Year at the 2011 Australian Book Industry Awards, and was adapted by Matchbox Pictures into a six-part television series for the SBS network in 2016, which Law created and co-wrote with Marieke Hardy (Series 1) and Kirsty Fisher and Lawrence Leung (Series 2). It won the Screen Producers Awards for Best Comedy (2016) and was nominated for two AACTA Awards. In 2012 Law published Gaysia: Adventures in the Queer East, a journalistic exploration of LGBT life in Asia. At the 2012 Sydney Writers' Festival, he presented on the topic of bullying, for a panel with Wendy Harmer and Paul Capsis.

In November 2015, he advocated for gay people in a public discussion hosted by Mildura Pride (a Mildura Rural City Council Initiative). The social inclusion initiative focused on making Mildura more welcoming for LGBTIQ communities.

In April 2018, Law became an ambassador for the National Library of Australia.

As a journalist, he has contributed to publications including Frankie, The Australian Financial Review, The Saturday Paper, The Monthly (including a 2014 supplement on the Museum of Old and New Art), The Courier-Mail and its Qweekend supplement, Griffith Review, New Matilda, Fairfax Media's Good Weekend magazine, The Big Issue and Crikey.

Law is founder member of the Australian Writers' Guild's Diversity and Inclusion Action Committee, along with Kodie Bedford and others. Law served as a judge for the 2025 National Photographic Portrait Prize.

== Bibliography ==
=== Books ===
- The Family Law (2010, ISBN 9781863954785)
- Gaysia: Adventures in the Queer East (2012, ISBN 9781863955768)

==== Co-authored ====
- Sh*t Asian mothers say, Collingwood, Vic. : Black Inc. (2014, ISBN 9781863956635) – with sister Michelle Law
- Law School : sex and relationship advice from Benjamin Law and his mum Jenny Phang, Melbourne, Vic. Brow Books (2017, ISBN 9780994606853)

==== Contributed chapters ====
- "Tourism", pp. 147–152, and "Towards manhood", pp. 195–203, in: Growing up Asian in Australia, Melbourne, Black Inc. (2008, ISBN 9781863951913)
- In: Voracious: best new Australian food writing, edited by Paul McNally, Prahran, Vic. : Hardie Grant Books (2011, ISBN 9781742701202)
- In: I'm not racist but ... forty years of the Racial Discrimination Act, by Tim Soutphommasane, Sydney, N.S.W. NewSouth Publishing (2015, ISBN 9781742242057)
- In: The book that made me, edited by Judith Ridge, Newtown, NSW Walker Books Australia (2016, ISBN 9781922244888)
- "Beijing", pp. [43]-49, in: Best Australian comedy writing, edited by Luke Ryan, Affirm Press, South Melbourne, Victoria (2016, ISBN 9781925475265)

==== Introductions ====
- In: Me and Mr Booker, by Cory Taylor, Melbourne, Victoria : The Text Publishing Company (2017, ISBN 9781925498271)

=== Essays and reporting ===
- "Moral Panic 101 - Equality, Acceptance and the Safe Schools Scandal". Quarterly Essay. 67. Black Inc. 2017. ISBN 9781863959513.
- "Chinese-Australian history predates the first fleet – and my family helped me find out how". The Guardian, 24 July 2019.

=== Interviews ===
- The women who shaped my life (August 2010). Cleo, pp. 100–102.
- Morris, Linda (21 December 2012). "Benjamin Law". The Sydney Morning Herald, p. 6.
- Tabart, Sally (July 2019). "A Day In The Life Of Benjamin Law, Writer". The Design Files.
- Tabart, Sally (April 2020). "Times Like These... With Writer Ben Law". The Design Files.

=== As editor ===
- Growing Up Queer in Australia (2019, ISBN 9781760640866)

== Filmography ==
Law's work includes:

=== As writer ===
Year	Title	Notes
2016-19	The Family Law	Creator/script writer (based on his memoir)
2017	Sisters	Episode 3
2021	New Gold Mountain	
2023	Wellmania	
2025	Claire Hooper's House of Games	Self; 5 episodes

=== As actor ===
Year	Title	Role	Notes
2018	Freudian Slip	Jacob's Id	Web series

=== Other work ===
Year	Title	Role	Notes
2016	Deep Water: The Real Story	Researcher/associate producer	Documentary film
2018	Filthy Rich and Homeless	Himself/participant	Docuseries
2018–present	That Startup Show	Co-host	Web series
2019	Waltzing the Dragon	Presenter	Two-part documentary
2023	Australian Survivor	Contestant	11 episodes; 14th place

== Theatre ==
Year	Title	Role	Notes
2018	Nassim	Performer	24 January performance
2020	Double Delicious	Performer	For Sydney Festival
2020	Torch the Place	Writer	For Melbourne Theatre Company
2025	Dying: A Memoir	Writer	For Melbourne Theatre Company

== Radio ==
Year	Title	Role	Notes
2019–present	Stop Everything!	Host	Podcast for ABC Radio National
2019	Look at Me	Host	Podcast for The Guardian
