= Short Cuts (TV series) =

Television series

- Created by: Ewan Burnett; Marieke Hardy; Galia Hardy
- Written by: Marieke Hardy
- Starring: Katie Barnes; Gemma Bishop; Damien Bodie; Alex Cappelli; Dylan Gray; Joel Gray; Leah de Niese; Lucia Smyrk; Alex Tsitsopoulos; Matthew Green
- Country of origin: Australia
- Original language: English
- No. of seasons: 1
- No. of episodes: 26

Production
- Executive producer: Ewan Burnett
- Producer: Margot McDonald
- Running time: 25 minutes
- Production company: Burberry Productions

Original release
- Network: Seven Network
- Release: 15 July 2002 – 19 August 2003

Short Cuts was an Australian children's television series that first screened on the Seven Network in 2002. The 26-episode series was aimed at teenagers. It was financed by the Australian Film Finance Corporation and Burberry Productions. The series was subsequently repeated on the youth-oriented network ABC3 in March and April 2011.

== Premise ==
Short Cuts depicts a group of students in a media studies class facing the challenges of growing up and using a camera to express themselves for their schoolwork.

== Location ==
The series was filmed at Fitzroy High School in the inner north of Melbourne.

== Cast ==
=== Main or regular ===
- Alex Tsitsopoulos as Ross Papasavas
- Gemma Bishop as Sophie Bennett
- Damien Bodie as Oscar Coxon
- Katie Barnes as Fiona Frischmann
- Alexander Cappelli as Kurt Winters
- Leah de Niese as Ruth Hartnell
- Lucia Smyrk as Anna Klopfer
- Dylan Gray as Tim McQuilten
- Joel Gray as Tom McQuilten
- Matthew Green as Gordon Long
- Kym Osborne as office guy

=== Recurring ===
- Katerina Kotsonis as Mrs Papasavas, Ross's mother
- Marcus Eyre as Aaron Winters, Kurt's father
- Alex Konis as Laz Papasavas, Ross's brother
- Bruce Spence as Mr Coxon
- Jane Hall as PC Demmler (2 episodes)
- Louise Siversen as Mrs Bartlett (9 episodes)
- Marieke Hardy (writer of the series) as Josephine Coxon (2 episodes)
- Johnny Lockwood as Hippy
- Denise Scott as Mrs Coxon (4 episodes)

=== Guests ===
- Angus Sampson as DJ
- Brett Swain as Glenn
- Lisa Aldenhoven as Mrs Frischmann

== Episodes ==
One series of Short Cuts was filmed, and comprised 26 episodes.

== Season 1 (2001) ==
Episode	Airdate	Prod. Code	Title
1	15 July 2001	101	Action! Oscar and the rest start school on the first day. Fiona and Ruth want to make a video of Laz Papasavas however Fiona embarrasses herself and no longer speaks to Ruth.
2	16 July 2001	102	Wheels on Fire Ross wants someone to film his soccer match after school and asks his mate, Sophie, to help him out however they end up fighting because Ross accidentally tips her out of her wheelchair.
3	17 July 2001	103	Money or the Box Ruth and Fiona finally make amends after their fight when they go to an International Oyster gig. Ross is no longer able to blackmail Oscar due to him knowing his little secret.
4	18 July 2001	104	Au Naturel Mr. Long gets the whole class to do a nature video after Ross disses Anna's nature video in front of the class.
5	19 July 2001	105	Crash and Burn The twins, Tim and Tom witness a car accident and videotape it thinking it is funny to put sound effects as well however, Sophie doesn't find it funny since she lost her dad in the accident that put her in the wheelchair.
6	22 July 2001	106	Home and Away Laz Papasavas is moving out of home for three weeks and Ross is enjoying the smothering by his mum until she takes it too far.
7	23 July 2001	107	Wonder Twins Activate Oscar is sick of the twins bullying him all the time and decides to take action. Ruth also wants some attention from Kurt by making a personal video of him at home which ends in disaster.
8	24 July 2001	108	Burn, Baby, Burn Ruth's mum makes her go on a diet with her because she thinks she is gaining weight. Little does she know that she's pregnant. Ruth however breaks the diet by eating food from her friends.
9	25 July 2001	109	My Funny Valentine Kurt is jigging school ever since Ruth's video and he needs to hand in his video assignment. His next door neighbour, Mrs. Green volunteers to be his subject even though he hates her.
10	26 July 2001	110	The Grass Is Greener Kurt is still making his video of Mrs. Green however doesn't finish it due to Ross using the video camera to film Fiona's ballet lessons.
11	29 July 2001	111	Super Geek
12	30 July 2001	112	The Thrill of the Chase
13	31 July 2001	113	A Fete Worse Than Death
14	1 August 2001	114	Anarchist's Convention
15	2 August 2001	115	Eye of the Tiger
16	5 August 2001	116	What a Feeling
17	6 August 2001	117	Every Vote Counts
18	7 August 2001	118	The Night of Nights
19	8 August 2001	119	Splitting a Tom
20	9 August 2001	120	Mummy Dearest
21	12 August 2001	121	Party on, Rhys
22	13 August 2001	122	Fight the PowerThree of the students are involved in a protest. Oscar gets arrested after he tries to save his mum and sister from getting arrested. Sophie feels strongly about the cause and claims to have gotten arrested to seem tough. Kurt gets pulled into it by his father after the bass player for his band was in a skiing accident, he was very embarrassed.
23	14 August 2001	123	Cops & Robbers
24	15 August 2001	124	Survivor
25	16 August 2001	125	As a Row of Tents
26	19 August 2001	126	Cut

== Awards ==
Marieke Hardy won an Australian Writers' Guild Award in 2002 for Short Cuts.

== See also ==
- List of Australian television series
