= McLeod's Daughters season 5 =

McLeod's Daughters
- Season 5
- Season 5 DVD
- Starring: Bridie Carter Simmone Jade Mackinnon
- No. of episodes: 32

Release
- Original network: Nine Network
- Original release: 9 February – 23 November 2005

Season chronology
- ← Previous; Season 4 Next → Season 6

The fifth season of the long-running Australian outback drama McLeod's Daughters began airing on 9 February 2005 and concluded on 23 November 2005 with a total of 32 episodes.

This is the first season where the opening credits are changed. They now feature both the actor's or actress' name and the character's name. Also, the theme song is now a remixed version of the original, still performed by Rebecca Lavelle.

Bridie Carter (Tess), Simmone Jade Mackinnon (Stevie), Rachael Carpani (Jodi), Aaron Jeffery (Alex), Brett Tucker (Dave), and Michala Banas (Kate) return as main cast members. Myles Pollard (Nick) returns as a main cast member before his character leaves for Argentina. He will return in the sixth season as a recurring character when it is discovered Nick is still alive. Sonia Todd returns as a recurring character for several episodes after being a main character during the first four seasons. Jonny Pasvolsky joins the main cast in the middle of season as Rob Shelton, the new overseer on Killarney.

== Cast ==
=== Main ===
- Bridie Carter as Tess Silverman McLeod Ryan
- Simmone Jade Mackinnon as Stevie Hall
- Rachael Carpani as Jodi Fountain
- Aaron Jeffery as Alex Ryan
- Myles Pollard as Nick Ryan (episodes 1–16)
- Brett Tucker as Dave Brewer
- Michala Banas as Kate Manfredi
- Jonny Pasvolsky as Rob Shelton (episode 16—)

=== Recurring ===
- Sonia Todd as Meg Fountain
- John Jarratt as Terry Dodge
- Marshall Napier as Harry Ryan
- Dean O'Gorman as Luke Morgan
- Kathryn Hartman as Sally Clemments
- Inge Hornstra as Sandra Ryan
- Henry Nixon as Greg Dawson
- Zoe Naylor as Regan McLeod
- Doris Younane as Moira Doyle

=== Guest ===
- Rhys Muldoon as Jeremy Quaid
- Tara Morice as Michelle Hall-Smith
- Basia A'Hern as Rose Hall-Smith
- Luke Jacobz as Patrick Brewer
- Sophie Cleary as Catriona Bradfield

== Episodes ==
No. overall	No. in season	Title	Directed by	Written by	Original release date
107	1	"No Man's Land"	Richard Jasek	Chris McCourt	9 February 2005
The fifth season premieres with Sally living on Wigul with new baby Harrison. Nick's attention is more on his new family than it is on Tess. When the girls head out on a muster, Tess tries forgoing the usual route, which calls for an overnight trip. Meanwhile, Sally is sick and Nick stays over to take care of the baby. When Tess discovers he is not home, she is furious not only because she wants him to choose her, but also because of a devastating incident with one of her alpacas. Elsewhere, Jodi and Kate try to make up after a game they played with Stevie. Alex and Dave try to get Harry back in the Killarney state of mind now that Sandra has left for good.
108	2	"Little White Lies"	Richard Jasek	Rick Held	16 February 2005
Nick begins lying to Tess about making visits to Sally and Harrison. Stevie, Alex, and Dave decide to keep this information from Tess. With the strain of this situation on them all, Nick decides it's best if he and Tess take a break from each other. Tess has hopes of showing The Colonel in the Wool Board Expo, but The Colonel develops an infection. Jodi is excited to model clothes for a local fashion designer and drags Stevie into being a model, but she is less enthusiastic about it. Kate, not being asked to model, feels passed over and rejected.
109	3	"Rules of Disengagement"	Steve Jodrell	Kym Goldsworthy	23 February 2005
Meg returns from the city with new surprises, including Luke's drag racing and Jodi’s involvement with it. She also tries giving the truck stop a more city-like feel. Meg, Stevie, and Alex are all worried about Tess's state of mind after Nick moves out for a break. Nick realizes he has to make a tough decision to get back the woman he loves, even if it costs him.
110	4	"Once Were Heroes"	Chris Martin-Jones	Denise Morgan	2 March 2005
When Dave comes across a waler, injured and in bad shape, he is ready to take action and find who neglected it. He soon finds more walers and that they are on the property of Jeremy Quaid, a politician running for pre-selection. With a tip off from Quaids manager, Dave ropes Alex, Stevie, and Kate into taking the horses after Quaid claims he would do something about their condition, but he is really planning on killing them. Jodi's lack of work ethic and frequent absences cause Stevie to fire her from Drover's Run. Sally is sent to the hospital and Nick must look after Harrison.
111	5	"Return of the Black Queen"	Steve Jodrell	Sarah Smith	9 March 2005
Sandra returns, much to Harry's excitement. However, Jeremy Quaid comes between the two of them, including making an offer to buy Sandra's farm and trying to push Harry off of the Local Farming Council. Tess has chicken pox, separating her from Nick, who finds out what it is like being a single father with a baby. Kate tries to win Jodi’s job back.
112	6	"Do You Read Me...?"	Arnie Custo	Meg Mappin	16 March 2005
Tess and Nick's lack of an intimate relationship has become public knowledge, and local women are sending Nick food. Meanwhile, Stevie's fascination with Alex's two way radio leads her to the discover a valuable horse. Kate and Sandra work together on a fence and Sandra offers Kate the station manager position on her farm. Jodi convinces Luke to make another bet with Greg to get his car back- only this time it involves her as bait.
113	7	"Taking Care of Business"	Chris Martin-Jones	Sally Webb	6 April 2005
The women of Drover's Run have gone their separate ways, with each of them experiencing varied difficulties. Kate is now working for Sandra, but her crew are less than willing to obey her orders and Sandra is very quick to get on Kate’s case regarding her relationship with Drover's Run. Jodi is struggling with her new job as a cosmetics saleswoman. Tess and Stevie are having difficulties running the farm, now down two hands. However, the women all come together when one of them is in need.
114	8	"Old Flames"	Arnie Custo	Hadass Segal	13 April 2005
Sally returns from hospital and is ready to take Harrison home to the city. Tess and Nick are both excited to get their marriage back on track, but an outburst from Nick when he sees Sally and Dave kissing doesn't sit well with Tess. Kate has organized a high school reunion hike. She gets a surprise when her first love, Daniel, joins the reunion and old memories flood back for the two of them. Jodi, however, is more worried about her old nemesis Natalie. Elsewhere, Luke and Meg get stuck driving together and end up on a trip that ends with them on better terms with each other.
115	9	"Body Blows"	Ray Qunit	Kym Goldsworthy	20 April 2005
Harry's heart condition worsens, causing him to have hallucinations of a woman bike rider. His condition makes him rethink the future of his ranch, so he appoints Alex the head of Killarney. Alex asks Jodi to parade his bull because he knows the judges like blondes. Meg is running against Harry in the local election, but some of her platform positions may affect others in unanticipated ways.
116	10	"Sins of the Father"	Ray Quint	Chris McCourt	27 April 2005
Sandra is beside herself with Harry's decision to leave Alex in charge of Killarney, and makes a point to cause trouble. Meanwhile, Nick discovers he has the same genetic heart condition as Harry. Tess, angered at Harry, soon finds out her husband's secret. The girls win $10,000 in a lottery, but the ticket has gone missing.
117	11	"Boy Made Good"	Chris Martin-Jones	Denise Morgan	4 May 2005
Stevie's old boyfriend and father of her daughter, Will Hamilton, turns up in Gungellan. Stevie is nervous at first, but then excited at the prospect of being able to tell her daughter the truth and having Rose's father in the picture as well. But, Will might not be who is says he is. Meanwhile, Luke continues trying to prove himself to Terry and makes financial decisions he can't handle, putting Rick back in the picture and Luke on a bad track. Tess finds a picture of Harrison hidden in Nick's drawer and wants him to know Harrison‘s photo should be displayed in their home.
118	12	"The Pearl"	Chris Martin-Jones	Giula Sandler	11 May 2005
Luke continues down a bad path with Rick and begins to involve everyone else when he stocks cigars in Stevie's car. When Stevie discovers this she tries to get Jodi to stay out of Luke's trouble. Jodi, however, continues to support Luke and gets herself into more trouble when the police begin investigating Rick and Luke. Jodi urges Luke to extricate himself, but she soon discovers more secrets- and when her life is at risk, Luke decides to flee. Jodi is heartbroken by everything and the two begin to face big decisions.
119	13	"The Prodigal Daughter"	Richard Jasek	Elizabeth Coleman	18 May 2005
Regan, Jasmine's sister and Tess's cousin, comes to Drover's for a visit. But her true intentions are not what she makes them believe; she really wants to see what should have been her father's and thus what should be hers. Tess and Regan do not hit it off initially, but Stevie and Regan find they have similar personalities. Dave, meanwhile, falls instantly for Regan, much to Kate's dismay. Elsewhere, Tess discusses starting a family, but Nick is apprehensive about having any more children, children whom he could pass the genetic heart condition on to.
120	14	"Love and Obsession"	Richard Jasek	Blake Ayshford	25 May 2005
Tess finds it hard connecting with Regan, who does not seem interested in her or farm life at Drover's Run. Meanwhile, Tess discovers that Nick sleepwalks. Kate, however, has misgivings about Regan and her real reasons for being at Drover's Run. Jodi thinks this is because Kate is jealous of Regan and Dave's relationship. Alex tries to get rid of a girl he went out with who becomes obsessed with him, and he wants to stay away from her. Stevie discovers Phoenix, Blaze's foal, and wants to bring Phoenix back to Drover's Run for Tess.
121	15	"One Long Long Day"	Kevin Carlin	Dave Warner	27 July 2005
Tess leaves Charlotte in Stevie's hands, but Charlotte goes missing, creating a rift between Tess and Stevie. Tess' reaction to Stevie's negligence weighs heavily on Stevie. Nick is offered a job in Argentina, and Tess wants him to take it. Kate is still pining after Dave, whose relationship with Regan continues to blossom.
122	16	"Down to Earth"	Kevin Carlin	Fin Edquist	3 August 2005
Tess discovers Regan wants to dig for gold under Drover's Run. When Regan will not back off from the idea, Tess makes the decision to stay behind and fight. Nick goes on ahead of Tess to Argentina. Rob Shelton arrives as Killarney's new overseer, but he doesn't seem to have the right impression of Alex, Stevie, or Jodi. He does stick up for Kate when a Killarney shearer disrespects her.
123	17	"Heart of Gold"	Chris Martin-Jones	Chris Phillips & Chris McCourt	10 August 2005
Tess, Stevie, and Kate team up to battle Regan and her decision to mine Drover's Run. The law seems to be on Regan's side, and Dave is still infatuated with Regan, so Tess tries as much as possible to find legal ways to stop or delay Regan's actions. Rob finds it hard to have authority over Sandra, who is taking advantage of them by using Killarney's materials and equipment on her own land. Terry returns from their trip solo, as Meg stays behind to write a book. Jodi thinks Terry misses Meg.
124	18	"Taking Flight"	Chris Martin-Jones	Sally Webb	17 August 2005
Stevie tries her best to take charge of Drover's now that Tess has left for Argentina. Alex gets stuck driving Sandra to Fisher and he makes the best of it by purposely making Sandra reach her boiling point. He discovers a surprise along the way about Sandra. Kate and Dave team up for the Twitch-a-thon.
125	19	"Make Believe"	Richard Jasek	Michaeley O'Brien	24 August 2005
Kate's grandmother is coming for a visit! But Kate has told her grandmother that she is in charge of Drover's Run and that Dave is going to ask her to marry him! The whole team follows along with her stories, to keep Kate's story realistic for her loving, overbearing grandmother. Moira joins the party after having car trouble. Terry gives her husband her car and Jodi breaks down while the two try to get to Fisher.
126	20	"Heaven and Earth"	Richard Jasek	Rick Held	31 August 2005
Stevie continues trying to keep Drover's running during Tess' absence, but an impending sale has her trying to impress a client. Meanwhile, a dangerous dust storm approaches. Oscar (Tess's horse) is sick because he ate contaminated feed, so Stevie, Jodi, and Kate must try to help him during the storm. Elsewhere, Terry discovers that Harry has purchased the truck stop and has hired Moira to manage it. This leaving Terry thinking about his future. Terry discovers Moria is also thinking about her future when she shares something personal with him while they are stuck at the truck stop during the duststorm. Rob thinks he may have been recognized and tries to push off the situation.
127	21	"Moonstruck"	Arnie Custo	Giula Sandler	7 September 2005
Meg returns and surprises Terry, but then feels out of place with Terry and Moira's new close working relationship; especially since Moira's marriage is falling apart. Stevie is curious about notes made in the Drovers Run ledger regarding Jodi. Alex asks Stevie to accompany him to the Farmer's Council Ball, but when he is contacted by an ex-flame, Alex takes her instead. Instead of admitting jealousy, Stevie blows it off. Her ensuing negligence leads Alex to be stuck in a tank with toxic fumes, and Stevie risks her own life to save him.
128	22	"If You Build It..."	Arnie Custo	Andrew Kelly	14 September 2005
Sandra and Stevie go head to head regarding the current drought, with Sandra only thinking of herself and Killarney. Sandra's stubbornness is discovered by Stevie to be related to the death of Sandra's mother, who abandoned her at a young age. Rob is not thrilled when Charlotte spends time at their place and gets into his belongings. His anger and apology to her begin to open up new lights on someone that is still a mystery to Alex. Jodi is determined that Rob must be gay, going to great lengths to prove it.
129	23	"Out of Time"	Chris Martin-Jones	Kym Goldsworthy	21 September 2005
Rose returns to Drover's for a visit, but this time is accompanied by Michelle, Stevie's sister. Michelle and Stevie argue about the decision to tell Rose the truth. Michelle begins realizing that Stevie could potentially take away the only child she's had, and the only child she may ever have since she and her husband cannot have children of their own.
130	24	"Betwixt and Between"	Chris Martin-Jones	Denise Morgan	28 September 2005
Stevie puts her work into the embryo transplant program after making a promise to Michelle not to tell Rose the truth. Rose, however, comes across some of Stevie's personal belongings from the past, revealing when Stevie had a baby. Rose begins putting the pieces together about Stevie's past and relationship with her family, so Stevie reveals the secret to Rose. Stevie is heartbroken at Rose's reaction and isn't sure of a future relationship with her own daughter.
131	25	"Truth or Dare"	Steve Jodrell	Chris McCourt	12 October 2005
Dave's brother, Patrick literally flies in for a visit by jumping out of a plane. Patrick soon forms a bond with Kate, but Patrick has unstable mental health and is angry at Dave for ignoring the anniversary of their father’s death. This causes him to take unprecedented and dangerous actions. Dave also has a larger truth to reveal to his brother. Stevie and Alex stake out a predator that has been killing animals on the farms.
132	26	"The King and I"	Steve Jodrell	Margaret Wilson	19 October 2005
Jodi receives a letter stating Jack McLeod left her a trust fund, making her wonder why he would do that. She relives her past experiences with Jack. Meg is apprehensive of the truth coming out and does her best to distract Jodi from these discussions, while working on Jodi's surprise party. Jodi, however, discovers that there is more to the story, and Meg reveals a truth that changes Jodi's life forever. Dave welcomes a veterinary student who isn't interested in being taught, but just wants to prove herself. Rob gets roped into doing a radio interview for Killarney, but does his best to keep himself out of the spotlight.
133	27	"Intentions"	Arnie Custo	Lily Taylor	26 October 2005
Catriona threatens Dave with a sexual harassment suit, so Dave tries his best to mend fences. Jodi's realization that much of her life may have been a lie leads her to Rob. He allows her to tag along driving with him and she opens up more than she thought she would. Meg tries to pick up the pieces from the bombshell, and including how the newly revealed information could threaten her relationship with Terry.
134	28	"Stranger than Fiction"	Arnie Custo	Alexa Wyatt	2 November 2005
Moira predicts that ringing will precede bad events. Alex argues with Harry about a lucrative deal. Unfavorable comparisons with Nick cause Alex to relive the Nick/Alex competition and brother vs brother rivalry. Meg is torn apart when her book is printed and the publisher wants to promote it in Gungallen. The big issue is that much the novel is taken from Jodi and Meg's personal life- right down to the big question- is Jodi Jack McLeod's daughter?
135	29	"Twelve and a Half Hours Behind"	Chris Martin-Jones	Dave Warner	9 November 2005
Tess returns to Drover's Run with Nick presumably following soon behind her. Tess' illness upon arrival has her in for a big surprise- she's pregnant. Tess begins to worry, however, when she doesn't hear from Nick. Eventually it is reported that his plane crashed, and he is presumed dead. Jodi tries to find something that would have Jack's DNA so she can truly find out who her father is.
136	30	"Anniversary"	Chris Martin-Jones	Dave Warner	16 November 2005
Tess is acting the complete opposite of what is expected for a devastated, grieving widow. Instead of mourning Nick, she wants everyone to celebrate his life with a party. She is waiting for Nick to appear to her as Claire did before she her burial, and cannot yet process her grief. Alex, meanwhile, is trying to grieve in his own way, but ends up blaming Harry for Nick's death. Harry is more worried about the arrival of his grandson, Harrison, than he is about Alex or Sandra. Dave has a surprise for Tess, and Kate practices singing for the celebration of life.
137	31	"Body and Soul"	Steve Jodrell	Fin Edquist	16 November 2005
Tess receives a letter Nick wrote before he died. She continues trying to move on, but feels something is holding her back. Alex has gone missing and Stevie goes out to look for him. Alex meets two young boys along his path who help him do his best to grieve the brother he lost. At Killarney, Harry is adamant that Sally and Harrison must stay, going to great lengths to give them everything they need. Sally, however, isn't keen on the idea; neither is Tess when Harry presumes he will be running her life as well, now that Nick is gone. Dave asks Kate to watch over a handful of baby chicks, but unforeseen circumstances leave Kate feeling un-motherly.
138	32	"New Beginnings"	Steve Jodrell	Kym Goldsworthy & Sarah Duffy	23 November 2005
In the fifth season finale, Tess has a recurring dream about Nick. Meanwhile, Stevie tries to put off her feelings about Alex, but can't do it anymore. She goes to lay it all on the line. Alex and Sandra, however, suffer from Harry's dismissal of them and the death of Nick, end up in the shack Harry wants renovated to lure Sally back. The shack catches on fire and Stevie is there to save them, so the timing isn't right for Stevie to tell Alex her feelings. Jodi gets DNA results back. She is Jack McLeod's daughter, but when she goes to tell Tess, Tess is sleeping. The two do not notice that Nick's watch has started to tick again.

== Reception ==
=== Ratings ===
On average, the fifth season was watched by 1.35 million viewers, down 170,000 viewers from the previous season. It was the most-watched Australian drama of 2005, and ranked at #6 for its fifth season.

=== Award nominations ===
The fifth season of McLeod's Daughters received six nominations at the 2006 Logie Awards.

- Gold Logie Award for Most Popular Personality on Australian Television (Bridie Carter)
- Logie Award for Most Popular Actress (Bridie Carter)
- Logie Award for Most Popular Actor (Aaron Jeffery)
- Logie Award for Most Popular New Male Talent (Jonny Pasvolsky)
- Logie Award for Most Popular Drama Series
- Logie Award for Most Outstanding Drama Series

== Home media ==
Title	Release	Region	Format	Ref(s)
McLeod's Daughters: The Complete Fifth Series	3 May 2006	Australia – R4	DVD	
McLeod's Daughters: The Complete Fifth Season	5 February 2008	USA – R1	DVD	
McLeod's Töchter: Die Komplette Fünfte Staffel	22 March 2013	Germany – R2	DVD	
