= McLeod's Daughters season 4 =

McLeod's Daughters
- Season 4
- Season 4 DVD
- Starring: Bridie Carter Simmone Jade Mackinnon
- No. of episodes: 32

Release
- Original network: Nine Network
- Original release: 11 February – 24 November 2004

Season chronology
- ← Previous; Season 3 Next → Season 5

The fourth season of the long-running Australian outback drama McLeod's Daughters began airing on 11 February 2004 and concluded on 24 November 2004 with a total of 32 episodes. This is the first season to not feature Lisa Chappell as Claire McLeod and Jessica Napier as Becky Howard, as both actresses left the series in the third season. Becky left to be with boyfriend Jake and Claire McLeod died at the end of the third season.

Bridie Carter (Tess), Simmone Jade Mackinnon (Stevie), Rachael Carpani (Jodi), Aaron Jeffery (Alex), and Myles Pollard (Nick) all return to the series main cast this season. Sonia Todd (Meg) returned to the main cast until her character left for Melbourne; she recurred thereafter. Michala Banas joins the cast this season as Kate Manfredi, a friend of Jodi's. Brett Tucker returns in a recurring role as Dave Brewer, but is added to the main cast at the end of the season.

The season was the third most watched series on Australian television for 2004. It was the most watched television drama on Australian television, averaging 1.51 million viewers, up from the previous season.

== Plot ==
Tess, now without her sister, has to find the strength to rebuild her life and take control of the Drovers' legacy. She faces challenges including her relationship and marriage with Nick, Peter returning for custody of Charlotte, working with Stevie and accepting her as her partner on Drover's, and being the glue that holds Drover's together.

Stevie deals with settling down on Drover's and finding the strength to build a relationship with her daughter, Rose, who believes Stevie is her aunt. Stevie's ex-husband returns to win her back, but budding relationships with newcomer Kane Morgan and with Alex make her realize that her marriage is in the past. Tess asks Stevie to continue on Drover's, but as her partner.

Cast of Season 4

Jodi and Meg both are trying to make the best decisions for their lives. Meg takes a chance and goes to Melbourne for a job opportunity, while Jodi takes on more responsibility on Drover's and with the CFS, while pursuing a relationship with Kane's younger brother, Luke.

The Ryan boys face the marriage of Harry and Sandra, while they both move back to Killarney. Alex tries to push away his feelings for Stevie, while Nick continues to grow with his relationship and later marriage to Tess.

Together, Nick and Tess have a bump in the road when Sally returns at the end of the season with news that will change Nick's and Tess' lives forever.

== Cast ==
=== Main ===
- Bridie Carter as Tess Silverman McLeod Ryan
- Simmone Jade Mackinnon as Stevie Hall
- Rachael Carpani as Jodi Fountain
- Aaron Jeffery as Alex Ryan
- Myles Pollard as Nick Ryan
- Sonia Todd as Meg Fountain (episodes 1–14; recurring after)
- Michala Banas as Kate Manfredi (episode 14—)
- Brett Tucker as Dave Brewer (episode 27—; recurring previously)

=== Recurring ===
- John Jarratt as Terry Dodge
- Brooke, Kaitlyn and Tahlia Stacey-Clark as Charlotte McLeod
- Marshall Napier as Harry Ryan
- Inge Hornstra as Sandra Kinsella Ryan
- Dean O'Gorman as Luke Morgan
- Craig McLachlan as Kane Morgan
- Reece Horner as Nat
- Luke Ford as Craig Woodland

=== Guest ===
- Harold Hopkins as Ken Logan
- Tasma Walton as Tracy Morrison
- Paul Kelmen as Dale Holloway
- Rodger Corser as Peter Johnson
- John Stanton as Bryce Redstaff
- Carmel Johnson as Beth Martin
- Grant Bowler as Jared Wuchowski
- Glenda Linscott as Celia Rivers
- Basia A'Hern as Rose Hall Smith
- Catherine Wilkin as Liz Ryan
- Anna Torv as Jasmine McLeod
- Kathryn Hartman as Sally Clemments

== Episodes ==
No. overall	No. in season	Title	Directed by	Written by	Original release date
75	1	"Out of the Ashes"	Chris Martin Jones	Dave Warner & Alexa Wyatt	11 February 2004
In the fourth season premiere, Tess is on her own as head of Drover's following Claire's death. She wants to continue Claire's training of horses, but finds balancing it all difficult with taking care of Charlotte, Stevie stealing one of Harry's horses, and a brushfire sweeping through the area. Meanwhile, Wilgul continues to experience financial problems.
76	2	"Double Dealing"	Geoff Bennett	Carol Williams	18 February 2004
Stevie gets caught in a mess after Sandra cashes in on her repayment from stealing the plane. To straighten things out, Tess plays Sandra in a poker game. Meanwhile, Nick and Alex try to fool the bank manager when Wilgul is in danger of foreclosure by borrowing stock and materials from Drover's to set themselves up for success. Terry is getting fed up with taking orders from Sandra when he works for Harry.
77	3	"Jack of All Shades"	Chris Martin-Jones	Murray Oliver & Sarah Smith	3 March 2004
A man claiming to be Jack's son shows up on Drover's. Tess welcomes the stranger into their home, but Nick is wary of the newcomer and his story. Tess's hospitality may not lead to what she thought. Meanwhile, Meg reveals that she had a substantial fling with Jack, with results much to everyone's surprise.
78	4	"Day of Reckoning"	Geoff Bennett	Denise Morgan	10 March 2004
Tess and Stevie try to get even with the new stock and station agent after he cheats them. Stevie, meanwhile, is excited to see her daughter on her birthday. Harry tries to convince his sons to move back to Killarney, but neither of them will have it, especially as long as Sandra is in the picture. When Harry has a heart attack, Nick and Alex begin rethinking his offer and the future of Wilgul. Terry lies about his new job to Meg, to keep his pride.
79	5	"Great Expectations"	Jessica Hobbs	Chris Hawkshaw	10 March 2004
Stevie takes an interest in Ken Logan, the owner of the petrol garage after he collapses and is in a poor state of mind. After Ken's death Stevie tries to reignite interest from his daughter, who doesn't seem to care much about her father. Terry lucks out when his daughter has a change of heart and decides to let Terry manage the garage. Meanwhile, Nick tries to lay ground rules down between the bickering Alex and Sandra after the boys move back to Killarney.
80	6	"Game of Chance"	Jessica Hobbs	Sally Webb	17 March 2004
Fantasy and reality collide for Tess when Dave returns after almost a year. Tess has to make a difficult decision between Dave and Nick. Meanwhile, Terry organizes a line dancing record to open the new Gungellan Truck Stop.
81	7	"When Sparks Fly"	Ray Quint	Chris McCourt	24 March 2004
Nick and Tess are at a crossroads in their relationship, with Tess not knowing where Nick's head is. Nick and Alex dam off the creek, causing Tess to take a page out of Stevie's book and get even with the two. Meanwhile, Stevie and Jodi continue not getting along, but the two come together when a tragedy occurs. Elsewhere, Meg is jealous of all the attention Terry is paying to the truck stop, and not to her.
82	8	"Show of Love"	Ray Quint	Margaret Wilson	31 March 2004
Alex's first love, Tracy, arrives at Drover's Run. This reignites a spark for Alex and distaste in Stevie, who thinks about missed opportunities she has had. Tracy also has an offer for Alex to join her on the rodeo circuit. Meanwhile, Jodi meets a man at the truck stop who turns out to be Tracy's husband, much to Alex's dismay. Elsewhere, Tess is having trouble with the artificial insemination of her sheep, causing her to turn to Nick for some help.
83	9	"Father's Day"	Geoff Bennett	Alexa Wyatt & Hadass Segal	14 April 2004
It's Charlotte's first birthday and Tess is in for a battle when Peter wants custody of Charlotte. Alex calls in his lawyer father, Bryce, to help. The circumstances throw both Alex and Tess into nervous states. Meanwhile, Harry tries to get himself back into shape for Sandra.
84	10	"Flesh and Blood"	Geoff Bennett	Alexa Wyatt & Lily Taylor	21 April 2004
Discovering an old well on Drover's Run brings up old memories for Tess involving her trauma at leaving the farm as a young child, and being separated from Claire. Tess makes a realization and tough decision regarding what is best for Charlotte as Peter continues his fight to bring Charlotte home with him. Elsewhere, Harry and Sandra have a surprise for Nick and Alex.
85	11	"Fool for Love"	Roger Dowling	Dave Warner	28 April 2004
Stevie's ex husband, Jared, arrives on Drover's. He reveals to Stevie that the two are actually still married- the divorce never went through and he wants to get back together with her. To push him away, Stevie enlists Alex to be her pretend boyfriend to attempt throwing Jared off. Meanwhile, Jodi tries to organize a calendar to raise funds for the CFS and she meets a new recruit, Dylan, in the process.
86	12	"Make or Break"	Roger Dowling	Giula Sandler	5 May 2004
When Tess' truck breaks down on the way to sell cattle she trusts a woman to help her take Jodi and the cattle to the sale. The woman and her husband actually steal Tess' cattle and kidnap Jodi. Frantic, Tess, Stevie, Alex, and Nick search for Jodi. The search for Jodi reignites sparks for Nick and Tess.
87	13	"Second Chance"	Ali Ali	Denise Morgan	12 May 2004
Meg's sister, Celia, arrives for a visit and her outgoing lifestyle has Meg rethinking that she could have done more with her own life. Her professor offers her a job as a researcher in Melbourne, and she thinks she wants to take the risk for herself. Meanwhile, sheep are being killed again and Roy seems to be the suspect this time, with everyone thinking he has gone feral.
88	14	"Call Me Kate"	Ali Ali	Chris McCourt	19 May 2004
Jodi's best friend from boarding school, Kate Manfredi, comes to Drover's to take Jodi's job. Kate puts her job on the line, and makes an enemy in Harry, after an incident with Sandra and sheep shearing. Meanwhile, Sandra is battling with the loss of her baby after suffering a miscarriage. Terry is finding it hard to say goodbye to Meg as she and Jodi prepare to head to Melbourne. In the end, Jodi has to make a tough decision for herself about the move. --- First appearance of Michala Banas as Kate Manfredi
89	15	"Desperate & Dateless"	Geoff Bennett	Alana Valentine & Hadass Segal	14 July 2004
The girls hit the road to go to the Bachelor and Spinster's Ball. On their way to the ball they pick up a hitchhiker, who leads them on a wild goose chase when he steals their car- with Stevie's opals in the trunk. Meanwhile, Alex hits off a friendship with Kane Morgan, who is new in town and plays a game of pool with him. Nick and Alex soon realize he is leasing Wilgul.
90	16	"Magnetic Attraction"	Geoff Bennett	Max Dann	21 July 2004
Stevie's daughter, Rose, shows up for a surprise visit. Her visit pushes Stevie to try and reveal to Rose that she is her mother. It doesn't come easy, especially after Rose creates turmoil for everyone on Drover's Run. Kate is still attracted to Dave and tries to figure out how to let him know. Elsewhere, Alex continues bonding with newcomer Kane.
91	17	"Every Breath You Take"	Karl Zwicky	Giula Sandler	28 July 2004
Stevie and Alex hold a rodeo school on Drover's. One of the students takes a special interest in Kate, but when she declines his offer to be more than friends he takes things to the extreme, putting her in danger. Stevie's approach with the rodeo students is not what they had expected, and Alex has to ease her down. Elsewhere, Tess aides a sick Nick.
92	18	"My Brother's Keeper"	Karl Zwicky	Dave Warner	4 August 2004
Nick and Alex argue over Kane's maintenance of Wilgul. Stevie meets Kane and the two instantly hit it off. Kate is still struggling with the nightmare of Paul. Dave tries to help her cope with the aftermath when he notices her fear.
93	19	"Saturn Returns"	Chris Martin Jones	Claire Haywood	11 August 2004
It's Tess' birthday and she is also ready to get her organic farm status. A bad batch of contaminated rye bread has Tess hallucinating and making some irrational decisions. Meanwhile, Harry and Sandra ask that Nick father a child for them.
94	20	"Friendly Fire"	Chris Martin Jones	Denise Morgan	1 September 2004
Kane begins to come between Alex and Stevie. Customers are suspicious when their cars begin breaking down after being at the truck stop. Harry soon discovers Luke has been buying cheap fuel. Elsewhere, Jodi and Kate compete for a promotion.
95	21	"Secrets and Lies"	Arnie Custo	Sue Hore & Hadass Segal	8 September 2004
It's the day of the charity race and Tess plans on being unconventional and proposing to Nick herself. She tries working up the courage and a plan, but Dave alters her decision again, when he reveals that Nick has been seeing Sally once more. When Tess tries to confront Nick she gets more than she bargained for. Kate takes the race more seriously than Jodi, so Jodi tries to find out why Kate is so determined to win. Jodi and Luke's relationship begins to make strides.
96	22	"For Love or Money"	Arnie Custo	Michaeley O'Brien	15 September 2004
Harry is ready to combine the properties with the pending nuptials of Tess and Nick, and Stevie is left feeling she doesn't fit in the picture. Vin is back and wants the opals from Stevie. Stevie decides to move on with Kane, but she and everyone else soon finds out what Kane has been hiding. Even without Kane, Stevie thinks she doesn't belong at Drover's until Tess makes her an offer- to be her partner.
97	23	"Dangerous Waters"	Richard Jasek	Sally Webb	22 September 2004
Anxiety and fear take over Tess after she loses her ring in the dam pond, and Nick takes too long to come back up from searching for it. She fears for Drover's Run, the animals, Charlotte, and especially Nick when she sees him in a deadly position during CFS training. Meanwhile, Stevie does not feel as though she has a true partnership with Tess, as Tess continually turns down her ideas. Kate can't work up the courage to ask Dave out and mistakenly ends up on a date with Craig.
98	24	"Where There's Fire"	Richard Jasek	Chris Phillips & Fin Edquist	29 September 2004
After two fires are started and Luke is missing from the CFS team, evidence and suspicion point to him as the culprit. Jodi, however, tries her best to prove this wrong. Tess is anxious and worries that her and Nick's 100% compatibility test means there will be no room for future improvement or growth in their relationship.
99	25	"Trembling on the Brink"	Chris Martin Jones	Chris McCourt	6 October 2004
After an earthquake tremor, Tess becomes worried about her pending nuptials to Nick. She wants to go extremely traditional and not see Nick the whole week before the wedding, but events and circumstances occur to make that impossible. Meanwhile, Kate surprises everyone with how far she goes to get Dave's attention. Stevie and Alex are running best man and woman errands and everything goes wrong- except that it leads to something more between the two of them.
100	26	"This Moment Forward"	Chris Martin Jones	Chris Hawkshaw	13 October 2004
Nick and Tess' wedding day has arrived, but not without issues. Liz makes a return for the wedding, with an unappealing proposition for Tess. Sandra is jealous and furious at Liz's return, and that Harry is bonding with her. Meanwhile, fire ants cause an interruption of the weddings plans and everyone pitches in so that Nick and Tess can become husband and wife.
101	27	"Something to Prove"	Ray Quint	Giula Sandler	20 October 2004
With Tess and Nick on their honeymoon, it's up to Stevie to take control at Drover's. Stevie and Kate both let pride get in their way. Stevie loses $10,000 because of an internet disconnection- a disconnection caused by Kate using machinery she has never used before. The two try and fix their mistakes before Tess returns. Jodi and Luke suss out their real feelings for each other after the CFS commander makes a pass at Jodi and a young customer has her eyes set on Luke. Elsewhere, when moving Nick and Tess into the main bedroom, memories of Claire come flooding back to Alex. Sandra leaves Harry to live with her sister for some time.
102	28	"My House is Your House"	Ray Quint	Hadass Segal	27 October 2004
Adjusting to Nick living at Drover's Run has caused the women to feel uncomfortable and they do not welcome his constant involvement. Trying to make everything more orderly for all parties, Tess confronts Nick, but it leads to an argument between the two of them. Meanwhile, Luke's carelessness leads to an escaped colt and Dave gelds one of Harry's colts by mistake. Dave's career is at risk when Harry threatens to sue him.
103	29	"A McLeod Daughter"	Arnie Custo	Lily Taylor & Dave Warner	3 November 2004
Jasmine McLeod, Tess' cousin arrives on Drover's. She is the daughter of Hugh McLeod, Jack McLeod's brother. Jasmine comes to scatter her father's ashes two years after his death, now that she has found out Drover's Run is actually a real place. Tess and Jasmine search through old logs to try and figure out the reason for an apparent rift between the two brothers. Meanwhile, Jasmine is still haunted by the death of her fiance in an equestrian event and it keeps her from riding. Alex takes a liking to Jasmine and the feelings seem to be mutual. Jodi contemplates getting a tattoo.
104	30	"The Things We Do for Love"	Arnie Custo	Chris Phillips & Fin Edquist	10 November 2004
Jasmine stays on at Drover's and Alex is determined to get her back on a horse again, especially after he brings her horse, Juno, to the farm. Jasmine is able to overcome her fears and get back on Juno, as Alex wines and dines her. However, Jasmine decides to move on from Drover's and restart her equestrian career. Nick takes care of Charlotte while working on the farm, to prove he and Tess can have children and also run the farm at the same time.
105	31	"Love Interrupted"	Karl Zwicky	Alexa Wyatt	17 November 2004
Sally returns to Drover's with a surprise that will test Nick and Tess' marriage- she is pregnant, allegedly with Nick's child. Tess is devastated and has trouble dealing with this news. Nick tries to figure out how a child with Sally can fit into the new life he has created with Tess. Meanwhile, a mysterious note and gift lead Stevie to a visit from Kane.
106	32	"Twice Bitten"	Karl Zwicky	Sarah Smith	24 November 2004
In the fourth season finale, Sally goes into labor before she can make it back to the city, and Tess is there to take her to the hospital. After Sally sees an album of Nick and Tess' wedding photos, she confesses to Tess that she still loves Nick. Tess has trouble coping with everything surrounding Sally. Meanwhile, Kane refuses to do work for Ray, his old car contact, but Stevie thinks he is still up to his old ways and tries to stop them. However, it is Luke who wants to take Ray up on the offer. In the end, Sally gives birth to a baby boy and Tess still has worries over this new part of Nick's life.

== Reception ==
=== Ratings ===
On average, the fourth season of McLeod's Daughters was watched by 1.51 million viewers, tied with Season 1. It was the most-watched Australian drama of 2004, and ranked at #3 for its fourth season.

=== Awards and nominations ===
The fourth season of McLeod's Daughters received one win and four nominations at the 2005 Logie Awards.

Wins

- Logie Award for Most Popular Australian Drama Series

Nominations

- Gold Logie Award for Most Popular Personality on Australian Television (Bridie Carter)
- Logie Award for Most Popular Actress (Bridie Carter)
- Logie Award for Most Popular Actor (Aaron Jeffery)
- Logie Award for Most Popular New Male Talent (Dean O'Gorman)

== Home media ==
Title	Release	Region	Format	Ref(s)
McLeod's Daughters: The Complete Fourth Series	12 October 2005	Australia – R4	DVD	
McLeod's Daughters: The Complete Fourth Season	6 November 2007	USA – R1	DVD	
McLeod's Töchter: Die Komplette Vierte Staffel	22 March 2013	Germany – R2	DVD	
