= McLeod's Daughters season 3 =

McLeod's Daughters
- Season 3
- Season 3 DVD
- Starring: Bridie Carter Lisa Chappell Simmone Jade Mackinnon
- No. of episodes: 30

Release
- Original network: Nine Network
- Original release: 12 February – 29 October 2003

Season chronology
- ← Previous; Season 2 Next → Season 4

The third season of the long-running Australian outback drama McLeod's Daughters began airing on 12 February 2003, and concluded on 29 October 2003, with a total of 30 episodes.

== Cast ==
=== Regular ===
- Lisa Chappell as Claire McLeod (episodes 1–29)
- Bridie Carter as Tess Silverman McLeod
- Jessica Napier as Becky Howard (episodes 1–26)
- Rachael Carpani as Jodi Fountain
- Aaron Jeffery as Alex Ryan
- Myles Pollard as Nick Ryan
- Sonia Todd as Meg Fountain
- Simmone Jade Mackinnon as Stevie Hall (episodes 27-30)

=== Recurring ===
- John Jarratt as Terry Dodge
- Marshall Napier as Harry Ryan
- Doris Younane as Moira Doyle
- Inge Hornstra as Sandra Kinsella
- Ben Mortley as Alberto Borelli (episodes 1–6)
- Catherine Wilkin as Liz Ryan (episodes 1–10)
- Brett Tucker as Dave Brewer (episodes 1–25)
- Charlie Clausen as Jake Harrison (episodes 1–26)

=== Guest ===
- Kathryn Hartman as Sally Clements
- Fletcher Humphrys as Brick Buchanon
- Richard Healy as Kevin Fountain
- Rodger Corser as Peter Johnson

== Episodes ==
No. overall	No. in season	Title	Directed by	Written by	Original release date
45	1	"Fairy Tale, Ending"	Karl Zwicky	Chris McCourt	12 February 2003
Claire is home from her stint in hospital, but it's far from easy for the single mum-to-be. She has to face the truth about her baby's father, the lies she and Alex have concocted, the fact that Drover's has stayed afloat without her instruction... and on top of that, Alex is involved in a chopper crash. First appearance of Brett Tucker as Dave Brewer
46	2	"Better the Devil You Know"	Karl Zwicky	Vicki Madden	19 February 2003
Alex and Claire's secret brings one family together and brings another to the brink. Tess and Liz clash over the lie – each with their own family's best interests at heart – while Jodi arrives home with a secret of her own.
47	3	"The Road Home"	Bill Hughes	Giula Sandler	26 February 2003
After months of searching, Becky finally finds out what happened to Brick. She and Jodi discover the horrible truth after Becky is led to Brick in a dream.
48	4	"An Affair to Forget"	Bill Hughes	Christina Milligan	5 March 2003
It seems Sally is taking advantage of Nick's absence in town by inviting a stranger over to Wilgul. Claire warns Tess against putting her nose in, but she just can't resist.
49	5	"Put to the Test"	Richard Jasek	Alexa Wyatt & Robert Armin	12 March 2003
A careless prank on the groom threatens to put a stop to the impending nuptials of Jodi and Alberto. Meanwhile, Claire's expanding waistline is causing her all kinds of problems!
50	6	"The Wedding"	Richard Jasek	Jeff Truman	19 March 2003
The Wedding Day is here and nearly everything that can go wrong does go wrong. But for one couple, it will be a day to remember- for all the right reasons!
51	7	"Gone to the Dogs"	Cath Roden	Ysabelle Dean	2 April 2003
When Becky and Jake are forced to steal a horse, they find new depths to their relationship. Alex is dismayed when Claire starts buying up old nags from the sale yards.
52	8	"The Ghost of Things to Come"	Cath Roden	Denise Morgan	9 April 2003
Claire discovers a hidden treasure which brings back fearful memories of her mother and unleashes the fear that she too will die in childbirth.
53	9	"House of Cards"	Karl Zwicky	Chris McCourt	23 April 2003
A thirtieth wedding anniversary is no protection for Liz, when Harry, suspicious about Claire's baby, discovers an even bigger lie.
54	10	"Three Little Words"	Karl Zwicky	Dave Warner	30 April 2003
Alex struggles with the truth about his family as Harry tries to win his son back the only way he knows how. Sally comes to the realisation that her relationship with Nick is going nowhere and she makes a heartbreaking decision.
55	11	"Repeat Offenders"	Bill Hughes	Chris Hawkshaw	7 May 2003
An old friend of Tess' makes a visit to Drover's Run, planning to portray the lives of the woman in her next article. Becky and Meg clash over Jake's appointment as Killarney's new overseer.
56	12	"Sins of the Father"	Bill Hughes	Shane Brennan & Giula Sandler	14 May 2003
Jake's true identity is revealed after his father and brother turn up wanting him to come home. Whilst weaning Phoenix from Blaze, Claire starts to realise that the lie about her baby isn't right and cannot last.
57	13	"Jokers to the Right"	Cath Roden	Margaret Kelly	21 May 2003
Sandra Kinsella is back and her meddling brings Alex and Claire to the brink. Will they go their separate ways and end their lie?
58	14	"Chain Reaction"	Cath Roden	Jeff Truman	28 May 2003
After Jodi tears up a chain letter, things start to go wrong at Drover's Run. As Dave shares his grief with Tess, Alex and Claire start to mend their wounds- despite Sandra's presence.
59	15	"The Awful Truth"	Chris Martin-Jones	Chris McCourt	4 June 2003
Harry is back in town and up to his old tricks. Sandra Kinsella's influence continues to spread, but just which Ryan man is she manipulating this time?
60	16	"Seeing the Light"	Chris Martin-Jones	Ysabelle Dean	23 July 2003
The appearance of mysterious Min Min lights over Drover's Run coincides with events that will alter the course of Claire & Tess' life forever.
61	17	"A Slight Interruption"	Karl Zwicky	Elizabeth Packett	30 July 2003
An emu plague interrupts life at Drover's Run. As Claire chooses to battle alone with her baby, Meg gets caught in a crossfire.
62	18	"Old Beginnings"	Karl Zwicky	Denise Morgan	6 August 2003
Peter returns to Drover's Run during the naming ceremony of his and Claire's baby, leading to a very important decision. Tess and Dave set out on an impulsive trip to the altar, which has an unexpected result.
63	19	"Where There's Smoke"	Ali Ali	Chris Hawkshaw	13 August 2003
As Claire discovers more about her new neighbour, Jodi is determined to prove herself at the Fire Service training weekend – but it's going to be far more difficult than she anticipated.
64	20	"Perfect Match"	Ali Ali	Jutta Goetze & Giula Sandler	20 August 2003
Jake's ambitions with Storm Cloud threaten his relationships with Becky and Claire. Speed Dating doesn't provide Claire with a match, but an internet ad reveals a rather interesting perfect match.
65	21	"Let the Best Man Win"	Chris Martin-Jones	Chris Pearce & Alexa Wyatt	27 August 2003
Both Nick and Alex practically fall over each other trying to win the affections of a newcomer to the district – but they are both in for a shock as the competition heats up.
66	22	"Majority Rules"	Chris Martin-Jones	Chris Hawkshaw	3 September 2003
Claire is coaxed into running for the Gungellan Farmers Council by Vince, but she won't win if Sandra Kinsella gets her way.
67	23	"The Ties That Bind"	Karl Zwicky	Dave Warner	10 September 2003
When Claire and Alex hit big smoke, a long-lost father is found and a hidden passion is finally ignited. Will Alex finally acknowledge his true feelings?
68	24	"One Step at a Time"	Karl Zwicky	Chris McCourt	17 September 2003
Claire and Alex are still in Melbourne with Charlotte and making plans to extend their stay. At Drover's, Tess discovers a lump on her breast and fearing her mother's fate, tells no one...not even Dave.
69	25	"Time Frames"	Ali Ali	Katherine Thomson	24 September 2003
Tess and Dave reach a crossroads, as her cancer scare reveals that Dave is not completely over grieving his wife Leanne.
70	26	"Body Language"	Ali Ali	Giula Sandler	1 October 2003
Drovers Run hosts the Regional Young Farmer of the Year Award and Becky is surprised to find herself competing with Jake. As the old spark between them returns, Becky is torn between the man she loves and Drover's Run. Final appearance of Jessica Napier as Becky Howard
71	27	"To Catch a Thief"	Chris Martin-Jones	Christina Milligan	8 October 2003
Surgery is not the only worry for Tess in this episode, as her fear and worry about cancer is compounded by the unsettling arrival of Claire's old friend, Stevie Hall. First appearance of Simmone Jade Mackinnon as Stevie Hall
72	28	"My Noon, My Midnight"	Chris Martin-Jones	Chris Hawkshaw	15 October 2003
Joy at Tess' biopsy result soon turns to tragedy, when Claire, Tess and Charlotte are involved in a serious car accident and one sister must make the ultimate sacrifice.
73	29	"The Long Goodbye"	Karl Zwicky	Denise Morgan	22 October 2003
Tess is struggling with Claire's death and survivor guilt, but a surprise visitor may help when she needs it most. Final appearance of Lisa Chappell as Claire McLeod
74	30	"Turbulence"	Karl Zwicky	Lily Taylor & Sarah Smith	29 October 2003
Tess is having a hard time getting along with Stevie. But when Charlotte's life is threatened, Tess and Stevie put aside their differences to save her.

== Production ==
The third season of McLeod's Daughters was announced in June 2002, and went into production in September 2002. It was originally commissioned for 26 episodes, before being extended to 30 episodes.

The season saw the departure of two of its leading characters – Jessica Napier and Lisa Chappell. Chappell was replaced with actress Simmone Jade Mackinnon in the role of Stevie Hall.

== Reception ==
=== Ratings ===
On average, McLeod's Daughters received an audience of 1.50 million, and ranked at #6 for its third season. Episode 28, "My Noon, "My Midnight" was watched by 1,705,000 viewers.

=== Awards and nominations ===
The third season of McLeod's Daughters received four wins and six nominations at the 2004 Logie Awards. It also received one nomination at the 2004 AFI Awards.

Wins

- Logie Award for Most Popular Actress (Lisa Chappell)
- Logie Award for Most Popular Actor (Aaron Jeffery)
- Logie Award for Most Popular Australian Program
- Logie Award for Most Popular Australian Drama Series

Nominations

- AFI Award for Best Television Drama Series
- Gold Logie Award for Most Popular Personality on Australian Television (Lisa Chappell)
- Logie Award for Most Popular Actress (Bridie Carter)
- Logie Award for Most Popular Actor (Myles Pollard)
- Logie Award for Most Popular New Female Talent (Simmone Jade Mackinnon)
- Logie Award for Most Outstanding Actress (Bridie Carter)
- Logie Award for Most Outstanding Drama Series

== Home media ==
Title	Release	Region	Format	Ref(s)
McLeod's Daughters: The Complete Third Series	13 April 2005	Australia – R4	DVD	
McLeod's Daughters: The Complete Third Season	14 August 2007	USA – R1	DVD	
McLeod's Töchter: Die Komplette Dritte Staffel	22 March 2013	Germany – R2	DVD	
