= McLeod's Daughters season 2 =

McLeod's Daughters
- Season 2
- Season 2 DVD
- Starring: Bridie Carter Lisa Chappell
- No. of episodes: 22

Release
- Original network: Nine Network
- Original release: 27 March – 16 October 2002

Season chronology
- ← Previous; Season 1 Next → Season 3

The second season of the long-running Australian outback drama McLeod's Daughters began airing on 27 March 2002 and concluded on 16 October 2002 with a total of 22 episodes. Created by Posie Graeme-Evans and Caroline Stanton, the format is produced by Millenium Television and Nine Films and Television for the Nine Network distributed by Southern Star Group.

== Cast ==
=== Regular ===
- Lisa Chappell as Claire McLeod
- Bridie Carter as Tess Silverman McLeod
- Jessica Napier as Becky Howard
- Rachael Carpani as Jodi Fountain
- Aaron Jeffery as Alex Ryan
- Myles Pollard as Nick Ryan
- Sonia Todd as Meg Fountain

=== Recurring ===
- John Jarratt as Terry Dodge
- Marshall Napier as Harry Ryan
- Catherine Wilkin as Liz Ryan
- Rodger Corser as Peter Johnson
- Fletcher Humphrys as Brick Buchanon (episodes 1–12)
- Charlie Clausen as Jake Harrison (episodes 13–22)

=== Guest ===
- Richard Healy as Kevin Fountain
- Carmel Johnson as Beth Martin
- Ben Mortley as Alberto Borelli
- Luke Ford as Craig Woodland
- Inge Hornstra as Sandra Kinsella
- Doris Younane as Moira Doyle

== Episodes ==
No. overall	No. in season	Title	Directed by	Written by	Original release date
23	1	"The Drovers Connection"	Robert Klenner	Chris Hawkshaw & Sarah Smith	27 March 2002
Alex teases Tess about her new venture, a hemp crop. Becky gets a visit from Sean, escaping another of their father's benders. Becky is secretly thrilled, seeing her chance to stop Sean going down the same path as Mark, her jailbird older brother.
24	2	"Through the Looking Glass"	Robert Klenner	David Phillips	3 April 2002
Drovers Run has a rabbit infestation and rabbit habits seem to be contagious. Claire can't get Peter Johnson out of her mind and is worried that, having made the first romantic move towards her, he's now gotten cold feet.
25	3	"Desperate Measures"	Lewis Fitz Gerald	Chris McCourt	10 April 2002
Claire's relationship with Peter is deepening. They are spending virtually twenty-four hours a day together as they seek out horses for training... and the time spent together only confirms how much they are starting to feel for each other.
26	4	"The Bore War"	Lewis Fitz Gerald	Alexa Wyatt	17 April 2002
It's a dry spell and the women are suffering the consequences of water shortages. Claire cleans out an old bore hole to water her stock, but the newly discovered water soon dries up when Nick irrigates his cash crop at Wilgul. Initial attempts to resolve the situation fail, so a water licensing representative is called in to adjudicate.
27	5	"Hello Stranger"	Donald Crombie	Michaeley O'Brien	24 April 2002
Meg's world is thrown into turmoil at the arrival of the man she gave her heart to... and the man she has told everyone walked out on her. But Kevin didn't simply walk out on Meg in the way everyone thought. As Jodi finds her dad simply delightful, Meg begins to remember all the reasons she fell in love with him in the first place.
28	6	"A Dry Spell"	Donald Crombie	Chris Phillips	1 May 2002
As final preparations for the Miss Gungellan Ball continue, Meg is faced with a difficult decision; to stay at the place she loves or to leave with the man she loves. Jodi is desperate to go with her father and is over the moon when Meg decides to take a chance for once in her life.
29	7	"Three's a Crowd"	Karl Zwicky	Chris Pearce & Alexa Wyatt	8 May 2002
Tess is finding herself increasingly isolated from Claire, because of Peter. Tess tries to patch things up between Alex and Nick, but mistakenly reveals the truth about the rodeo accident – that Harry could have stopped the boys going competing, but chose not to. Harry’s subsequent assignment of all blame to 16 year old Alex has left years of scars on the family.
30	8	"The Bridle Waltz"	Karl Zwicky	Robert Dudley & Alexa Wyatt	15 May 2002
Claire and Peter move one step closer to marriage when Peter holds a romantic dinner, presenting Claire with a valuable ruby pendant and declaring he wants to spend the rest of his life with her. Meanwhile, Becky discovers what she hoped was not true in fact is – Peter is married. She struggles with the burden of telling Claire the truth, knowing it will destroy Claire's life.
31	9	"To Have and to Hold"	Chris Martin-Jones	Chris McCourt & Sarah Smith	3 July 2002
Claire's relationships are fragmented ... she barely speaks to Becky, and now Tess is living in Melbourne. When Peter arrives, unsuspecting, she asks him straight out whether he is married and upon learning that he is, she sends him packing.
32	10	"Home is Where the Heart is"	Chris Martin-Jones	Ysabelle Dean	10 July 2002
Claire is taking the loss of both Peter and Tess very badly. Unable to raise energy or enthusiasm for anything, including the imminent birth of Blaze's foal, she nonetheless refuses to accept she is suffering from emotional stress. Things reach crisis point when she decides to sell Drovers and give up all she has known.
33	11	"Wildfire"	Ian Gilmour	Sally Webb	17 July 2002
Things appear to be going well for Becky's young brother Sean. However, when older brother Mark returns to the district, he determinedly sows the seeds of temptations for Sean. Sean soon finds himself unwillingly drawn into Mark's schemes against the Ryans.
34	12	"Hounded"	Ian Gilmour	Dave Warner	24 July 2002
There's a fox on the prowl. Tess can understand the need to shoot the animal, but if there's a better way to handle the pest, Tess will find it. When Terry buys some guard Alpacas it seems the perfect solution, until Tess learns that one of her Alpacas is a stolen $200,000 Peruvian stud.
35	13	"Steer Trek"	Karl Zwicky	David Phillips & Alexa Wyatt	31 July 2002
With the drought continuing and no money to buy feed or truck in water, Claire, Tess and Nick join forces. Like the drovers of old, they take their amalgamated herds out on the Gungellan track. Meg is quietly delighted when the Ryans send Terry along to help, and sees a chance to win him back from Jane. The attraction between Nick and Tess grows.
36	14	"Brave J"	Karl Zwicky	Louise Crane	7 August 2002
Tess motivates Claire into rekindling her dreams of becoming a stock horse trainer and breeder. Drovers Run needs the money, and with Peter out of the way there is slim chance of crossing paths with him again. There's no reason why the dream can't still be pursued.
37	15	"You Can Leave Your Hat On"	Chris Martin-Jones	Giula Sandler	15 August 2002
When a stranger knocks on their door in the middle of the night claiming a broken down van, suspicions are aroused. When it is discovered that the occupants of the van are male strippers, Jodi is thrilled and volunteers to cook them dinner with disastrous results.
38	16	"Stripped Bare"	Chris Martin-Jones	Chris Hawkshaw	21 August 2002
Everything from Drover’s Run is stolen whilst Jodi and Craig have a secret rendezvous in the spa. When Wilgul is also burgled, Tess and Nick decide to set a trap to catch the thieves.
39	17	"Blame It on the Moonlight"	Donald Crombie	Chris McCourt	4 September 2002
Claire is irritated over Tess' three homestay guests. They're starting to shear today and the last thing she needs are tourists getting in the way. Jodi is surprised by Alberto's return from Italy.
40	18	"Made to be Broken"	Donald Crombie	Ysabelle Dean	18 September 2002
Claire and Alex are finding their potential clients are being put off by destructive rumours spread by Peter Johnson- that 10 years ago Alex was responsible for crippling a local boy when he ran his car off the road.
41	19	"Best of Enemies"	Robert Klenner	David Phillips	25 September 2002
Tess meets Sandra Kinsella at the cattle sale yards and likes her instantly, only to discover that Claire dislikes her intensely. Their childhood dispute is renewed when a herd of calves is stolen from Drover’s Run, and Claire is convinced that Sandra is responsible.
42	20	"Wind Change"	Robert Klenner	Chris Phillips	2 October 2002
Sexual tension is building between Nick and Tess. Tess is ready to take a step forward, but is interrupted when Alex's chopper flies over Killarney and dusts with chemicals, which threatens the adjacent freshly sown Wilgul organic wheat crop.
43	21	"No More Mr Nice Guy"	Karl Zwicky	Sarah Smith	9 October 2002
On the eve of the Gungellan Show, Claire is presented with repossession papers, a result of her defaulting on the contract with Australian Bloodlines. Claire is shattered when she discovers she is pregnant and Becky is devastated when Brick doesn't return.
44	22	"Future Perfect"	Karl Zwicky	Chris Hawkshaw	16 October 2002
Peter offers to stop Australian Bloodlines repossessing Drovers if Claire agrees to marry him. After rejecting Peter's deal, Claire takes him on in the Stockman's Challenge and falls. Her accident reveals her pregnancy and Alex claims paternity.

== Reception ==
=== Ratings ===
On average, McLeod's Daughters received an audience of 1.41 million, and ranked at #10 for its second season.

=== Award nominations ===
The second season of McLeod's Daughters received six nominations at the 2003 Logie Awards.

- Gold Logie Award for Most Popular Personality on Australian Television – Nomination (Lisa Chappell)
- Logie Award for Most Popular Actress – Nomination (Bridie Carter)
- Logie Award for Most Popular Actress – Nomination (Lisa Chappell)
- Logie Award for Most Popular Actor – Nomination (Myles Pollard)
- Logie Award for Most Popular New Male Talent – Nomination (Ben Mortley)
- Logie Award for Most Popular Australian Program – Nomination

== Home media ==
Title	Release	Region	Format	Ref(s)
McLeod's Daughters: The Complete Second Series	14 July 2004	Australia – R4	DVD	
McLeod's Daughters: The Complete Second Season	8 May 2007	USA – R1	DVD	
McLeod's Töchter: Die Komplette Zweite Staffel	22 March 2013	Germany – R2	DVD	
