= Deep Shock =

2003 television film

- Promotional image
- Written by: Paul Joshua Rubin; Jeff Rank; Brian Mammett
- Directed by: Paul Joshua Rubin
- Starring: David Keith; Simmone Jade Mackinnon
- Theme music composer: Rich McHugh
- Country of origin: United States
- Original language: English

Production
- Producers: Jeffery Beach; Phillip Roth
- Cinematography: Todd Barron
- Editor: David Flores
- Running time: 93 minutes

Original release
- Network: Syfy
- Release: 2003

Deep Shock is a 2003 American science-fiction-horror film that debuted as a Sci Fi Pictures TV-movie on the Sci Fi Channel. Its plot concerns an unknown underwater object that disables an American nuclear-powered submarine and attacks a submerged Arctic research complex. The monsters of the movie are giant intelligent electric eels.

== Plot ==
The US Navy nuclear-powered attack submarine USS Jimmy Carter is attacked by a mysterious underwater object that stalks and disables the Seawolf-class super-sub with a powerful electromagnetic pulse. The underwater Arctic research complex Hubris witnesses the attack and reports a rapid rise in the temperature of the Polaris Trench which threatens to melt the ice cap and flood the world's land surface. At an emergency United Nations scientific conference, Hubris director Dr. Ann Fletcher is dismissed when she urges caution and her archrival Dr. Chomsky pushes through a far more aggressive plan to deal with the crisis. When Chomsky's plan fails and contact with the Hubris complex is lost, Dr. Fletcher is asked to participate in a follow-up expedition, which also includes Chomsky, by her ex-husband, Navy Captain Andy Raines. Once at the North Pole, the expedition finds that the Hubris complex is completely intact, but its personnel have been incinerated.

== Cast ==
- David Keith as Captain Andy Raines, USN
- Simmone Jade Mackinnon as Dr. Anne Fletcher
- Mark Sheppard as Dr. Chomsky
- Sean Whalen as Arciero
- Armando Valdés as Protas
- Robert Zachar as Michael (as Bob Zachar)
- Richard Gnolfo as Rodgers
- Todd Kimsey as Hurst
- Tyrone Pinkham as Beach
- Velizar Binev as Dr. Pashe
- Ivaylo Geraskov as Russian G-8 Representative
- Anatoly Nechev as French G-8 Representative

== Production ==
Deep Shock was produced by DEJ Productions, Unified Film Organization and Eel Productions, LLC in association with Media Entertainment GMBH & CO 1. Filmproduktions KG.

== See also ==
- List of underwater science fiction works
