= McLeod's Daughters season 1 =

McLeod's Daughters
- Season 1
- Season 1 DVD
- Starring: Bridie Carter Lisa Chappell
- No. of episodes: 22

Release
- Original network: Nine Network
- Original release: 8 August 2001 – 20 March 2002

Season chronology
- Next → Season 2

The first season of the long-running Australian outback drama McLeod's Daughters began airing on 8 August 2001 and concluded on 20 March 2002 with a total of 22 episodes. Created by Posie Graeme-Evans and Caroline Stanton, the format is produced by Millennium Television and Nine Films and Television for the Nine Network distributed by Southern Star Group.

== Plot ==
Having spent most of her life in the city, Tess Silverman returns home when she inherits part of Drover's Run, a cattle station passed down the generations of the McLeod family, from her late father, Jack McLeod. There she meets her estranged half-sister, Claire, after twenty years of separation. Tess announces that her mother Ruth, Jack's second wife and Claire's step mother, died recently. Claire, now in charge of the property, is placed in a desperate position when she discovers her farmhands have breached her trust, as they did her father, and fires them. With the future of Drover's Run now in jeopardy, Claire enlists the help of her sister, along with the local wayward delivery girl, Becky, the housekeeper of Drover's, Meg, and Meg's spoiled daughter, Jodi. Against all odds, they form an unlikely workforce, in the hope of saving the land and the property.

Claire, at first, struggles to bond with Tess, more so when she discovers Tess' secret – she plans to sell her share of the heritage and fulfil her dream of owning a café in the city, much to Claire's worry when she tries to convince Tess that in doing so could spell disaster for Drover's Run.

== Cast ==
=== Regular ===
- Lisa Chappell as Claire McLeod
- Bridie Carter as Tess Silverman McLeod
- Jessica Napier as Becky Howard
- Rachael Carpani as Jodi Fountain
- Aaron Jeffery as Alex Ryan
- Myles Pollard as Nick Ryan
- Sonia Todd as Meg Fountain

=== Recurring ===
- John Jarratt as Terry Dodge
- Marshall Napier as Harry Ryan
- Catherine Wilkin as Liz Ryan
- Fletcher Humphrys as Brick Buchanon

=== Guest ===
- John Sheerin as Brian Cronin
- Rodger Corser as Peter Johnson
- Carmel Johnson as Beth Martin
- Ben Mortley as Alberto Borelli
- Luke Ford as Craig Woodland

== Episodes ==
No. overall	No. in season	Title	Directed by	Written by	Original release date
1	1	"Welcome Home"	Chris Martin Jones	Michaeley O’Brien	8 August 2001
Spontaneous, audacious Tess meets reticent, stubborn Claire when the half-sisters are reunited by their father Jack's recent death and an "odd couple" situation is born. A simple mistake by Tess leads to Claire making some difficult decisions.
2	2	"Ducks on the Pond"	Kay Pavlou	Margaret Wilson	15 August 2001
It's shearing time and one of the men arrives with a reputation as a killer. Tess witnesses strange goings on and uncovers a secret, as Claire struggles to maintain her authority over the shearers, desperate to meet the deadline for selling her wool.
3	3	"Don't Mess with the Girls"	Chris Martin Jones	Charlie Strachan	22 August 2001
Jealousies arise as Claire competes in the rodeo while Nick and Alex compete for Tess's attention. Becky's reputation lands her in serious trouble, and the two sisters forget their differences and come to the rescue.
4	4	"Who's the Boss?"	Kay Pavlou	Claire Haywood & Sarah Smith	5 September 2001
When Claire buys a pen of undernourished sheep from the stock sales, Tess questions her judgment. The truck transporting them breaks down, leaving the girls to drove the ailing sheep home on foot. Jodi's exam results bring a surprise conclusion.
5	5	"Taking the Reins"	Donald Crombie	Jackie McKimmie & Alexa Wyatt	19 September 2001
Tess's confidence is shaken when she falls from her horse. She wonders if she truly belongs at Drover's Run, but finds her skill as a rider when Claire is in need. Claire makes her toughest decision since Jack's death.
6	6	"Reality Bites"	Donald Crombie	Margaret Wilson	26 September 2001
When Claire finds evidence that her father loved Tess, she feels threatened. Meg and Claire discover more about Becky's home life when she temporarily returns to work at her parents' truck stop.
7	7	"Pride and Joy"	Donald Crombie	John Honey	3 October 2001
A feral bull is wreaking havoc on Drover's Run, and Harry Ryan uses the opportunity to stake his own claim on the girls' property despite Alex's opposition.
8	8	"Stir Crazy"	Donald Crombie	Chris Hawkshaw	10 October 2001
A steamy night gives away Meg's secret lover, and Claire puts her life on the line against a wild stallion that comes in the night to steal her prized mare.
9	9	"Into the Woods"	Kay Pavlou	Louise Crane	17 October 2001
Tess puts herself in danger when she comes between a dangerous wild boar and Claire's beloved cattle dog.
10	10	"Haunted"	Kay Pavlou	Chris Hawkshaw	24 October 2001
Emotional and traumatic events of past and present return to haunt the lives of the women of Drovers Run.
11	11	"Who's a Big Girl Now?"	Chris Martin Jones	Dave Warner	31 October 2001
Meg struggles to cope with the reality of Jodi's coming of age and during the ensuing surprise 18th birthday party, relationships are put to the test.
12	12	"Pandora's Box"	Chris Martin Jones	Deborah Parsons & Alexa Wyatt	7 November 2001
Tess learns the impenetrable rules of what to say and not to say in the country; and an innocent remark re opens a very ugly wound, which divides the Ryan brothers.
13	13	"Love of My Life"	Donald Crombie	Giula Sandler	14 November 2001
When the McLeods' neighbour, Bill Tilson decides to sell up and move to the city, Claire sees the precariousness of her own situation on Drover's Run. Meg meanwhile is preparing to make her annual tomato chutney. Despite her best efforts it tastes awful and she doesn't understand why.
14	14	"Dirty Pool"	Donald Crombie	Michaeley O’Brien	21 November 2001
Cattle thieves are working in the district. Killarney has been struck and a flock of Claire's sheep have gone missing. The arrival of Senior Constable Cook to inform Claire the sheep have been found in the national park irritates Becky and Jodi who suspect he knows more than he's saying about Becky's altercation with Brian.
15	15	"If the Boots Fit"	Kay Pavlou	Cathy Strickland	28 November 2001
Tess is left in charge of Drovers Run when Claire attends an AI seminar. Sparks fly when she meets Peter Johnson. Tess proves herself by saving cows from a polluted river.
16	16	"Playing to Win"	Karl Zwicky	Marieke Hardy & Alexa Wyatt	5 December 2001
The sudden death of local farmer Max Martin alarms Harry, prompting inner fears of his own mortality, and a sudden outward drive to defy whatever fate may have in store by pursuing instant and rapid expansion of his property. Meanwhile Claire and Tess come across an accident involving one of their neighbours- with dramatic consequences for the Ryans.
17	17	"Girls Night Out"	Kay Pavlou	Louise Crane	13 February 2002
A good sale at the sheep sales and the girls are ready to celebrate. A night at the pub, a bit of karaoke perhaps, all the signs of a great "Girls Night Out". But things don't go as planned when it is revealed that the new barmaid, Kimmy, has been receiving the same abuse Becky fell victim to, at the hands of Brian.
18	18	"More than One Way"	Karl Zwicky	Sally Webb	20 February 2002
Claire is finding it difficult to come to terms with Tess' newfound relationship with Alex. Her dream of developing a Quarter Horse breeding program at Drover's Run looks as if it may be close to coming to fruition, and she's using it as an excuse to push Tess away. Claire is about to achieve her dream, and wants Tess to have hers - that little cafe in Brunswick she used to talk about.
19	19	"The Italian Stallion"	Donald Crombie	Dave Warner	27 February 2002
Love is in the air over Drovers Run. When Alberto, an itinerant, good looking young Italian rescues Jodi from a rampant steer, she falls hopelessly in love with him.
20	20	"Lover Come Back"	Donald Crombie	Michaeley O’Brien	6 March 2002
Tess is obsessed with her new psychology theory - the three levels of why. But all the psychology in the world can't explain why Alex isn't as romantic as she would like him to be, why Becky and Jodi are at each other's throats, or why Loverboy - the bull Claire sells to Nick - keeps breaking out of Nick's yards and returning to Drovers Run.
21	21	"Friends Like These"	Geoff Bennett	John Honey & Chris Hawkshaw	13 March 2002
After a grubby day mustering cattle, Tess is thrilled to see two friends turn up unannounced at the homestead. Simon and Briony are her best mates from TAFE. While they're still hugging hello they drop their bombshell. They've got a lease on the cafe they all dreamed about and they want Tess to come back to the city with them ASAP.
22	22	"Deep Water"	Geoff Bennett	Sarah Smith	20 March 2002
Jodi is excited by the upcoming charity polo match she's organized to be played at Drovers Run - part of her fund-raising efforts for the Miss Gungellan quest. Becky finds Brian ransacking her room and he informs her the charges against him have been dropped. Becky is devastated. Everyone is alarmed when Brian's body is discovered in a dam pond.

== Production ==
Following the success of the 1996 telemovie, which was intended to serve as a pilot for the series, the creators had expectations that the Nine Network would commission a subsequent series. However, Nine initially rejected any plans to pick up a series, stating that they did not believe a female-driven drama would appeal to audiences. In a further attempt to negotiate a deal, Nine decided to make a compromise to order three more telemovies, to no avail. They later accepted a deal to commission a season of 13 episodes, before expanding to 22 episodes.

The series was filmed on location in the same area as the telemovie. When Nine decided to proceed with the series, they purchased the 55-hectare property in Kingsford, South Australia in 1999, which included the decrepit 145-year-old sandstone homestead.

== Reception ==
=== Ratings ===
On average, McLeod's Daughters received an audience of 1.51 million, and ranked #7 for its first season. The series premiere was watched by 1,890,000 viewers.

=== Awards and nominations ===
The first season of McLeod's Daughters received one win and one nomination at the 2002 Logie Awards.

- Logie Award for Most Popular Australian Program – Nomination
- Logie Award for Most Popular New Female Talent – Win (Lisa Chappell)

== Home media ==
Title	Release	Region	Format	Ref(s)
McLeod's Daughters: The Complete First Series	10 September 2003	Australia – R4	DVD	
McLeod's Daughters: The Complete First Season	3 October 2006	USA – R1	DVD	
McLeod's Töchter: Die Komplette Erste Staffel	22 March 2013	Germany – R2	DVD	
