= List of McLeod's Daughters episodes =

McLeod's Daughters is an Australian television drama series, created by Posie Graeme-Evans and Caroline Stanton, and produced by Millennium Television, in association with Nine Films and Television and Southern Star, for the Nine Network. The series, based on a television film of the same name, stars Lisa Chappell and Bridie Carter as two half-sisters, reunited after twenty years of separation, when their inherit their late father's cattle station in South Australia. After three years, the show's central focus shifted from the McLeod sisters, following the departures of main cast members, and took on a more ensemble format.

During the course of the series, 224 episodes of McLeod's Daughters aired over eight seasons, between 8 August 2001 and 31 January 2009.

== Series overview ==
Season	Episodes	Originally released		Ave. viewers (millions)
Season	Episodes	First released	Last released	Ave. viewers (millions)
Pilot		11 May 1996		TBA
1	22	8 August 2001	20 March 2002	1.51
2	22	27 March 2002	16 October 2002	1.41
3	30	12 February 2003	29 October 2003	1.50
4	32	11 February 2004	24 November 2004	1.51
5	32	9 February 2005	23 November 2005	1.35
6	32	15 February 2006	29 November 2006	1.31
7	32	7 February 2007	17 October 2007	1.18
8	22	23 July 2008	31 January 2009	0.63

== Episodes ==
=== TV Movie Pilot (1996) ===
Title	Directed by	Written by	Original release date
"McLeod's Daughters"	Michael Offer	Posie Graeme-Evans, Caroline Stanton & Ro Hume	11 May 1996

=== Season 1 (2001-02) ===
No. overall	No. in season	Title	Directed by	Written by	Original release date
1	1	"Welcome Home"	Chris Martin Jones	Michaeley O’Brien	8 August 2001
2	2	"Ducks on the Pond"	Kay Pavlou	Margaret Wilson	15 August 2001
3	3	"Don't Mess with the Girls"	Chris Martin Jones	Charlie Strachan	22 August 2001
4	4	"Who's the Boss?"	Kay Pavlou	Claire Haywood & Sarah Smith	5 September 2001
5	5	"Taking the Reins"	Donald Crombie	Jackie McKimmie & Alexa Wyatt	19 September 2001
6	6	"Reality Bites"	Donald Crombie	Margaret Wilson	26 September 2001
7	7	"Pride and Joy"	Donald Crombie	John Honey	3 October 2001
8	8	"Stir Crazy"	Donald Crombie	Chris Hawkshaw	10 October 2001
9	9	"Into the Woods"	Kay Pavlou	Louise Crane	17 October 2001
10	10	"Haunted"	Kay Pavlou	Chris Hawkshaw	24 October 2001
11	11	"Who's a Big Girl Now?"	Chris Martin Jones	Dave Warner	31 October 2001
12	12	"Pandora's Box"	Chris Martin Jones	Deborah Parsons & Alexa Wyatt	7 November 2001
13	13	"Love of My Life"	Donald Crombie	Giula Sandler	14 November 2001
14	14	"Dirty Pool"	Donald Crombie	Michaeley O’Brien	21 November 2001
15	15	"If the Boots Fit"	Kay Pavlou	Cathy Strickland	28 November 2001
16	16	"Playing to Win"	Karl Zwicky	Marieke Hardy & Alexa Wyatt	5 December 2001
17	17	"Girls Night Out"	Kay Pavlou	Louise Crane	13 February 2002
18	18	"More than One Way"	Karl Zwicky	Sally Webb	20 February 2002
19	19	"The Italian Stallion"	Donald Crombie	Dave Warner	27 February 2002
20	20	"Lover Come Back"	Donald Crombie	Michaeley O’Brien	6 March 2002
21	21	"Friends Like These"	Geoff Bennett	John Honey & Chris Hawkshaw	13 March 2002
22	22	"Deep Water"	Geoff Bennett	Sarah Smith	20 March 2002

=== Season 2 (2002) ===
No. overall	No. in season	Title	Directed by	Written by	Original release date
23	1	"The Drovers Connection"	Robert Klenner	Chris Hawkshaw & Sarah Smith	27 March 2002
24	2	"Through the Looking Glass"	Robert Klenner	David Phillips	3 April 2002
25	3	"Desperate Measures"	Lewis Fitz Gerald	Chris McCourt	10 April 2002
26	4	"The Bore War"	Lewis Fitz Gerald	Alexa Wyatt	17 April 2002
27	5	"Hello Stranger"	Donald Crombie	Michaeley O'Brien	24 April 2002
28	6	"A Dry Spell"	Donald Crombie	Chris Phillips	1 May 2002
29	7	"Three's a Crowd"	Karl Zwicky	Chris Pearce & Alexa Wyatt	8 May 2002
30	8	"The Bridle Waltz"	Karl Zwicky	Robert Dudley & Alexa Wyatt	15 May 2002
31	9	"To Have and to Hold"	Chris Martin-Jones	Chris McCourt & Sarah Smith	3 July 2002
32	10	"Home is Where the Heart is"	Chris Martin-Jones	Ysabelle Dean	10 July 2002
33	11	"Wildfire"	Ian Gilmour	Sally Webb	17 July 2002
34	12	"Hounded"	Ian Gilmour	Dave Warner	24 July 2002
35	13	"Steer Trek"	Karl Zwicky	David Phillips & Alexa Wyatt	31 July 2002
36	14	"Brave J"	Karl Zwicky	Louise Crane	7 August 2002
37	15	"You Can Leave Your Hat On"	Chris Martin-Jones	Giula Sandler	15 August 2002
38	16	"Stripped Bare"	Chris Martin-Jones	Chris Hawkshaw	21 August 2002
39	17	"Blame It on the Moonlight"	Donald Crombie	Chris McCourt	4 September 2002
40	18	"Made to be Broken"	Donald Crombie	Ysabelle Dean	18 September 2002
41	19	"Best of Enemies"	Robert Klenner	David Phillips	25 September 2002
42	20	"Wind Change"	Robert Klenner	Chris Phillips	2 October 2002
43	21	"No More Mr Nice Guy"	Karl Zwicky	Sarah Smith	9 October 2002
44	22	"Future Perfect"	Karl Zwicky	Chris Hawkshaw	16 October 2002

=== Season 3 (2003) ===
No. overall	No. in season	Title	Directed by	Written by	Original release date
45	1	"Fairy Tale, Ending"	Karl Zwicky	Chris McCourt	12 February 2003
46	2	"Better the Devil You Know"	Karl Zwicky	Vicki Madden	19 February 2003
47	3	"The Road Home"	Bill Hughes	Giula Sandler	26 February 2003
48	4	"An Affair to Forget"	Bill Hughes	Christina Milligan	5 March 2003
49	5	"Put to the Test"	Richard Jasek	Alexa Wyatt & Robert Armin	12 March 2003
50	6	"The Wedding"	Richard Jasek	Jeff Truman	19 March 2003
51	7	"Gone to the Dogs"	Cath Roden	Ysabelle Dean	2 April 2003
52	8	"The Ghost of Things to Come"	Cath Roden	Denise Morgan	9 April 2003
53	9	"House of Cards"	Karl Zwicky	Chris McCourt	23 April 2003
54	10	"Three Little Words"	Karl Zwicky	Dave Warner	30 April 2003
55	11	"Repeat Offenders"	Bill Hughes	Chris Hawkshaw	7 May 2003
56	12	"Sins of the Father"	Bill Hughes	Shane Brennan & Giula Sandler	14 May 2003
57	13	"Jokers to the Right"	Cath Roden	Margaret Kelly	21 May 2003
58	14	"Chain Reaction"	Cath Roden	Jeff Truman	28 May 2003
59	15	"The Awful Truth"	Chris Martin-Jones	Chris McCourt	4 June 2003
60	16	"Seeing the Light"	Chris Martin-Jones	Ysabelle Dean	23 July 2003
61	17	"A Slight Interruption"	Karl Zwicky	Elizabeth Packett	30 July 2003
62	18	"Old Beginnings"	Karl Zwicky	Denise Morgan	6 August 2003
63	19	"Where There's Smoke"	Ali Ali	Chris Hawkshaw	13 August 2003
64	20	"Perfect Match"	Ali Ali	Jutta Goetze & Giula Sandler	20 August 2003
65	21	"Let the Best Man Win"	Chris Martin-Jones	Chris Pearce & Alexa Wyatt	27 August 2003
66	22	"Majority Rules"	Chris Martin-Jones	Chris Hawkshaw	3 September 2003
67	23	"The Ties That Bind"	Karl Zwicky	Dave Warner	10 September 2003
68	24	"One Step at a Time"	Karl Zwicky	Chris McCourt	17 September 2003
69	25	"Time Frames"	Ali Ali	Katherine Thomson	24 September 2003
70	26	"Body Language"	Ali Ali	Giula Sandler	1 October 2003
71	27	"To Catch a Thief"	Chris Martin-Jones	Christina Milligan	8 October 2003
72	28	"My Noon, My Midnight"	Chris Martin-Jones	Chris Hawkshaw	15 October 2003
73	29	"The Long Goodbye"	Karl Zwicky	Denise Morgan	22 October 2003
74	30	"Turbulence"	Karl Zwicky	Lily Taylor & Sarah Smith	29 October 2003

=== Season 4 (2004) ===
No. overall	No. in season	Title	Directed by	Written by	Original release date
75	1	"Out of the Ashes"	Chris Martin Jones	Dave Warner & Alexa Wyatt	11 February 2004
76	2	"Double Dealing"	Geoff Bennett	Carol Williams	18 February 2004
77	3	"Jack of All Shades"	Chris Martin-Jones	Murray Oliver & Sarah Smith	3 March 2004
78	4	"Day of Reckoning"	Geoff Bennett	Denise Morgan	10 March 2004
79	5	"Great Expectations"	Jessica Hobbs	Chris Hawkshaw	10 March 2004
80	6	"Game of Chance"	Jessica Hobbs	Sally Webb	17 March 2004
81	7	"When Sparks Fly"	Ray Quint	Chris McCourt	24 March 2004
82	8	"Show of Love"	Ray Quint	Margaret Wilson	31 March 2004
83	9	"Father's Day"	Geoff Bennett	Alexa Wyatt & Hadass Segal	14 April 2004
84	10	"Flesh and Blood"	Geoff Bennett	Alexa Wyatt & Lily Taylor	21 April 2004
85	11	"Fool for Love"	Roger Dowling	Dave Warner	28 April 2004
86	12	"Make or Break"	Roger Dowling	Giula Sandler	5 May 2004
87	13	"Second Chance"	Ali Ali	Denise Morgan	12 May 2004
88	14	"Call Me Kate"	Ali Ali	Chris McCourt	19 May 2004
89	15	"Desperate & Dateless"	Geoff Bennett	Alana Valentine & Hadass Segal	14 July 2004
90	16	"Magnetic Attraction"	Geoff Bennett	Max Dann	21 July 2004
91	17	"Every Breath You Take"	Karl Zwicky	Giula Sandler	28 July 2004
92	18	"My Brother's Keeper"	Karl Zwicky	Dave Warner	4 August 2004
93	19	"Saturn Returns"	Chris Martin Jones	Claire Haywood	11 August 2004
94	20	"Friendly Fire"	Chris Martin Jones	Denise Morgan	1 September 2004
95	21	"Secrets and Lies"	Arnie Custo	Sue Hore & Hadass Segal	8 September 2004
96	22	"For Love or Money"	Arnie Custo	Michaeley O'Brien	15 September 2004
97	23	"Dangerous Waters"	Richard Jasek	Sally Webb	22 September 2004
98	24	"Where There's Fire"	Richard Jasek	Chris Phillips & Fin Edquist	29 September 2004
99	25	"Trembling on the Brink"	Chris Martin Jones	Chris McCourt	6 October 2004
100	26	"This Moment Forward"	Chris Martin Jones	Chris Hawkshaw	13 October 2004
101	27	"Something to Prove"	Ray Quint	Giula Sandler	20 October 2004
102	28	"My House is Your House"	Ray Quint	Hadass Segal	27 October 2004
103	29	"A McLeod Daughter"	Arnie Custo	Lily Taylor & Dave Warner	3 November 2004
104	30	"The Things We Do for Love"	Arnie Custo	Chris Phillips & Fin Edquist	10 November 2004
105	31	"Love Interrupted"	Karl Zwicky	Alexa Wyatt	17 November 2004
106	32	"Twice Bitten"	Karl Zwicky	Sarah Smith	24 November 2004

=== Season 5 (2005) ===
No. overall	No. in season	Title	Directed by	Written by	Original release date
107	1	"No Man's Land"	Richard Jasek	Chris McCourt	9 February 2005
108	2	"Little White Lies"	Richard Jasek	Rick Held	16 February 2005
109	3	"Rules of Disengagement"	Steve Jodrell	Kym Goldsworthy	23 February 2005
110	4	"Once Were Heroes"	Chris Martin-Jones	Denise Morgan	2 March 2005
111	5	"Return of the Black Queen"	Steve Jodrell	Sarah Smith	9 March 2005
112	6	"Do You Read Me...?"	Arnie Custo	Meg Mappin	16 March 2005
113	7	"Taking Care of Business"	Chris Martin-Jones	Sally Webb	6 April 2005
114	8	"Old Flames"	Arnie Custo	Hadass Segal	13 April 2005
115	9	"Body Blows"	Ray Qunit	Kym Goldsworthy	20 April 2005
116	10	"Sins of the Father"	Ray Quint	Chris McCourt	27 April 2005
117	11	"Boy Made Good"	Chris Martin-Jones	Denise Morgan	4 May 2005
118	12	"The Pearl"	Chris Martin-Jones	Giula Sandler	11 May 2005
119	13	"The Prodigal Daughter"	Richard Jasek	Elizabeth Coleman	18 May 2005
120	14	"Love and Obsession"	Richard Jasek	Blake Ayshford	25 May 2005
121	15	"One Long Long Day"	Kevin Carlin	Dave Warner	27 July 2005
122	16	"Down to Earth"	Kevin Carlin	Fin Edquist	3 August 2005
123	17	"Heart of Gold"	Chris Martin-Jones	Chris Phillips & Chris McCourt	10 August 2005
124	18	"Taking Flight"	Chris Martin-Jones	Sally Webb	17 August 2005
125	19	"Make Believe"	Richard Jasek	Michaeley O'Brien	24 August 2005
126	20	"Heaven and Earth"	Richard Jasek	Rick Held	31 August 2005
127	21	"Moonstruck"	Arnie Custo	Giula Sandler	7 September 2005
128	22	"If You Build It..."	Arnie Custo	Andrew Kelly	14 September 2005
129	23	"Out of Time"	Chris Martin-Jones	Kym Goldsworthy	21 September 2005
130	24	"Betwixt and Between"	Chris Martin-Jones	Denise Morgan	28 September 2005
131	25	"Truth or Dare"	Steve Jodrell	Chris McCourt	12 October 2005
132	26	"The King and I"	Steve Jodrell	Margaret Wilson	19 October 2005
133	27	"Intentions"	Arnie Custo	Lily Taylor	26 October 2005
134	28	"Stranger than Fiction"	Arnie Custo	Alexa Wyatt	2 November 2005
135	29	"Twelve and a Half Hours Behind"	Chris Martin-Jones	Dave Warner	9 November 2005
136	30	"Anniversary"	Chris Martin-Jones	Dave Warner	16 November 2005
137	31	"Body and Soul"	Steve Jodrell	Fin Edquist	16 November 2005
138	32	"New Beginnings"	Steve Jodrell	Kym Goldsworthy & Sarah Duffy	23 November 2005

=== Season 6 (2006) ===
No. overall	No. in season	Title	Directed by	Written by	Original release date	Aus. viewers (millions)
139	1	"Lost and Found"	Arnie Custo	Chris McCourt	15 February 2006	1.32
140	2	"Truth Hurts"	Richard Jasek	Andrew Kelly	22 February 2006	1.37
141	3	"Kiss of Death"	Arnie Custo	Sally Webb	1 March 2006	N/A
142	4	"Luck be a Lady"	Richard Jasek	Rick Held	8 March 2006	N/A
143	5	"The Real McLeod"	Declan Eames	Chris Hawkshaw	29 March 2006	1.30
144	6	"The Calling"	Declan Eames	Fin Edquist	5 April 2006	N/A
145	7	"What Lies Beneath"	Grant Brown	Tracey Trinder	26 April 2006	N/A
146	8	"Where the Heart Is"	Grant Brown	Margaret Wilson	3 May 2006	N/A
147	9	"Deliver Us from Evil"	Richard Jasek	Nick Stevens	10 May 2006	N/A
148	10	"The Big Commitment"	Richard Jasek	Chris Hawkshaw	17 May 2006	N/A
149	11	"Biting the Bullet"	Arnie Custo	Sarah Duffy	31 May 2006	N/A
150	12	"Second Best"	Arnie Custo	Sally Webb	7 June 2006	N/A
151	13	"The Trouble with Harry"	Steve Jodrell	Elizabeth Coleman	14 June 2006	N/A
152	14	"The Legend of Harry Ryan"	Richard Jasek	Rick Held	21 June 2006	N/A
153	15	"Second Chances"	Steve Jodrell	Tracey Trinder	12 July 2006	N/A
154	16	"Secrets and Lies"	Richard Jasek	Margaret Wilson	19 July 2006	N/A
155	17	"The Life of Riley"	Arnie Custo	Fin Edquist	26 July 2006	N/A
156	18	"Wild Horses"	Declan Eames	Mardi McConnochie	2 August 2006	N/A
157	19	"The Great Temptation"	Declan Eames	Dave Warner	9 August 2006	N/A
158	20	"Suspicious Minds"	Arnie Custo	Nick Stevens	16 August 2006	N/A
159	21	"Days of Reckoning"	Steve Jodrell	Samantha Winston	23 August 2006	N/A
160	22	"Scratch the Surface"	Steve Jodrell	Blake Ayshford	20 September 2006	N/A
161	23	"For Better or Worse"	Richard Jasek	Rick Held	27 September 2006	1.23
162	24	"The Eleventh Hour"	Richard Jasek	Margaret Wilson	4 October 2006	1.21
163	25	"Old Wrongs"	Steve Jodrell	Sally Webb & Sarah Duffy	11 October 2006	1.15
164	26	"Handle with Care"	Steve Jodrell	James Walker	18 October 2006	1.14
165	27	"Guess Who's Coming to Dinner?"	Andrew Prowse	Sarah Duffy & Chris McCourt	25 October 2006	1.15
166	28	"One Perfect Day"	Andrew Prowse	Alexa Wyatt	1 November 2006	1.17
167	29	"Winners and Losers"	Declan Eames	Tracey Trinder	8 November 2006	1.21
168	30	"Damage Control"	Declan Eames	Jane Allen	15 November 2006	1.15
169	31	"Risk"	Arnie Custo	Chris McCourt & Margaret Wilson	22 November 2006	1.25
170	32	"Twenty Questions"	Arnie Custo	Chris Hawkshaw	29 November 2006	1.41

=== Season 7 (2007) ===
No. overall	No. in season	Title	Directed by	Written by	Original release date	Aus. viewers (millions)
171	1	"Second Chances"	Arnie Custo	Nick Stevens & Jane Allen	7 February 2007	1.18
172	2	"All the Wrong Places"	Arnie Custo	Michaeley O'Brien & Sarah Duffy	14 February 2007	1.15
173	3	"Digging Up the Past"	Richard Jasek	Margaret Wilson	21 February 2007	1.15
174	4	"Thicker than Water"	Richard Jasek	Jane Allen & Justine Gillmer	28 February 2007	1.17
175	5	"Reaching Out"	Andrew Prowse	Chris McCourt	7 March 2007	1.21
176	6	"Returned Favour"	Andrew Prowse	Chris Hawkshaw	14 March 2007	1.32
177	7	"Of Hearts and Hunters"	Richard Jasek	Nick Stevens	21 March 2007	1.32
178	8	"Climb Every Mountain"	Richard Jasek	Michaeley O'Brien	11 April 2007	1.33
179	9	"Sisters Are Doing it for Themselves"	Grant Brown	Margaret Wilson	18 April 2007	1.24
180	10	"The Rules of Engagement"	Grant Brown	Jane Allen	25 April 2007	1.36
181	11	"Bloodlines"	Declan Eames	Jane Allen	2 May 2007	1.24
182	12	"Warts and All"	Declan Eames	Chris McCourt	9 May 2007	1.18
183	13	"Conflict of Interests"	Arnie Custo	James Walker	16 May 2007	1.18
184	14	"Flesh and Stone"	Arnie Custo	Chris Hawkshaw	30 May 2007	1.28
185	15	"All's Fair in Love and War"	Steve Jodrell	Jane Allen	6 June 2007	1.29
186	16	"Ever After"	Steve Jodrell	Margaret Wilson	20 June 2007	1.40
187	17	"Grace Under Fire"	Grant Brown	Sarah Smith	27 June 2007	1.26
188	18	"Gift Horse"	Arnie Custo	Anthony Ellis	11 July 2007	1.08
189	19	"Hot Water"	Arnie Custo	James Walker	18 July 2007	1.12
190	20	"Leaving the Nest"	Declan Eames	Chris Hawkshaw	25 July 2007	1.16
191	21	"A Spark from Heaven"	Declan Eames	Chris Hawkshaw	1 August 2007	1.21
192	22	"The Courage Within"	Declan Eames	Chris McCourt	8 August 2007	1.07
193	23	"Divided We Stand"	Richard Jasek	Jane Allen & Tracey Trinder	15 August 2007	1.08
194	24	"On the Prowl"	Richard Jasek	Margaret Wilson	22 August 2007	1.07
195	25	"Fanning the Flames"	Nick Bufalo	Anthony Ellis	29 August 2007	0.99
196	26	"My Enemy, My Friend"	Nick Bufalo	Justine Gillmer	5 September 2007	1.08
197	27	"Knight in Shining Armor"	Grant Brown	Greg Millin	12 September 2007	1.18
198	28	"The Short Cut"	Grant Brown	Alexa Wyatt	19 September 2007	1.09
199	29	"Seeing is Believing"	Arnie Custo	Jane Allen	26 September 2007	0.94
200	30	"Second Chances"	Arnie Custo	Chris Hawkshaw	3 October 2007	1.01
201	31	"Mixed Messages"	Richard Jasek	Sarah Duffy	10 October 2007	1.08
202	32	"Silent Night"	Richard Jasek	Chris McCourt	17 October 2007	1.21

=== Season 8 (2008-09) ===
No. overall	No. in season	Title	Directed by	Written by	Original release date	Aus. viewers (millions)
203	1	"Aftermath"	Arnie Custo	Margaret Wilson	23 July 2008	1.09
204	2	"The Pitfalls of Love"	Arnie Custo	Nick Stevens	30 July 2008	0.88
205	3	"Wild Ride"	Steve Mann	James Walker	6 August 2008	0.93
206	4	"Nowhere to Hide"	Steve Mann	Sarah Duffy	6 December 2008	0.58
207	5	"Stand by Me"	Richard Jasek	Sam Carroll	13 December 2008	0.59
208	6	"Close Enough to Touch"	Richard Jasek	Christopher D. Hawkshaw	13 December 2008	0.59
209	7	"Bringing Up Wombat"	Ian Watson	Greg Millin & Justine Gillmer	20 December 2008	N/A
210	8	"Three Sisters"	Ian Watson	Chris Corbett	20 December 2008	N/A
211	9	"Dammed"	Arnie Custo	Peter Dick	27 December 2008	N/A
212	10	"Mother Love"	Arnie Custo	Sally Webb	27 December 2008	N/A
213	11	"Bright Lights, Big Trouble"	Grant Brown	Liz Doran & Jane Allen	3 January 2009	N/A
214	12	"Love and Let Die"	Grant Brown	Nick Stevens & Alexa Wyatt	3 January 2009	N/A
215	13	"A Dog's Life"	Steve Mann	Justine Gillmer	10 January 2009	N/A
216	14	"My Prince Will Come"	Steve Mann	Michaeley O'Brien	10 January 2009	N/A
217	15	"Snogging Frogs"	Richard Jasek	Christopher D. Hawkshaw	17 January 2009	0.61
218	16	"The Merry Widow"	Richard Jasek	Sarah Duffy	17 January 2009	0.61
219	17	"Show Pony"	Arnie Custo	Chris Corbett	17 January 2009	0.61
220	18	"Every Move You Make"	Arnie Custo	Jane Allen	17 January 2009	0.61
221	19	"Into Thin Air"	Steve Mann	Hamilton Budd & Justine Gillmer	24 January 2009	N/A
222	20	"The Show Must Go On"	Steve Mann	John Ridley	24 January 2009	N/A
223	21	"Into the Valley of the Shadow"	Richard Jasek	Michaeley O'Brien	31 January 2009	0.58
224	22	"The Long Paddock"	Richard Jasek	Alexa Wyatt	31 January 2009	0.58
