= McLeod's Daughters =

2001–2009 Australian drama TV series

- Final season title card
- Also known as: Drovers Run, McLeod's
- Genre: Soap opera Drama
- Created by: Posie Graeme-Evans; Caroline Stanton
- Developed by: Posie Graeme-Evans
- Starring: Bridie Carter; Lisa Chappell; Jessica Napier; Rachael Carpani; Aaron Jeffery; Myles Pollard; Sonia Todd; Simmone Jade Mackinnon; Michala Banas; Brett Tucker; Jonny Pasvolsky; Luke Jacobz; Zoe Naylor; Dustin Clare; Doris Younane; Gillian Alexy; Matt Passmore; Abi Tucker; Edwina Ritchard; John Schwarz
- Theme music composer: Chris Harriott
- Opening theme: "I'll Be There" by Rebecca Lavelle
- Composers: Chris Harriott; Alastair Ford
- Country of origin: Australia
- Original language: English
- No. of seasons: 8
- No. of episodes: 224 and telemovie (list of episodes)

Production
- Executive producers: Kris Noble; Posie Graeme-Evans; Susan Bower; Karl Zwicky; Sandra Levy; Jo Horsburgh
- Producers: Posie Graeme-Evans; Susan Bower; Karl Zwicky; Vikki Barr
- Production locations: Kingsford between the townships of Gawler and Freeling, one hour north of Adelaide
- Camera setup: Single-camera setup Film (Super 16)
- Running time: 45 minutes
- Production companies: Millennium Television; Nine Films and Television; Southern Star

Original release
- Network: Nine Network
- Release: 8 August 2001 – 31 January 2009

McLeod's Daughters is an Australian drama television series created by Posie Graeme-Evans and Caroline Stanton for the Nine Network, which aired from 8 August 2001, to 31 January 2009, lasting eight seasons. It stars Lisa Chappell and Bridie Carter in the leading roles as two sisters reunited after twenty years of separation, thrust into a working relationship when they inherit their family's cattle station in South Australia. The series is produced by Millennium Television, in association with Nine Films and Television and Southern Star. Graeme-Evans, Kris Noble and Susan Bower served as the original executive producers.

The series was originally conceived as a then-intended television film pilot, which broadcast on Nine Network in 1996. Despite its success, and becoming the highest-rated telemovie in Australian television history, a series was not picked up by the network until several years later.

The majority of filming took place on location in Kingsford, a locality in South Australia. An instant success, McLeod's Daughters enjoyed critical acclaim, ultimately reaching the number one drama spot during its fourth and fifth season. The series was nominated for a number of awards, including 41 Logie Awards, winning eight in total, notably for Most Popular Actress, Most Popular Actor, Most Popular Australian Program, and Most Popular Australian Drama Series. It has also achieved acclaim around the world, having developed a devoted fan base in the United States, Canada, Ireland, several European countries, and is moderately successful in the United Kingdom.

In September 2026, it was announced during Nine Network’s upfronts the series is set for a revival which will premiere on Stan in 2027.

== Premise ==
Following the death of Jack McLeod, his daughter, Claire, has inherited Drover's Run, a substantial cattle station, situated in South Australia. While trying to keep her home and business moving forward, the future of the property is suddenly placed in jeopardy when her estranged half-sister, Tess, whom Claire has not seen for 20 years, arrives and announces that she has inherited half the land and intends to sell her share. Unable to buy her out, Claire attempts to convince Tess of the consequences of selling and how it could possibly affect the property. Claire is forced to get rid of her current employees due to a deceitful discovery, until Tess agrees to remain on Drover's Run for the time being to help her sister, despite her inexperience. Together, with help of housekeeper, Meg, her daughter, Jodi, and local girl, Becky, the women create an all-female workforce.

== Production ==
=== Development ===
Posie Graeme-Evans developed the idea for McLeod's Daughters in the early 1990s for her company Millennium Pictures in conjunction with the South Australian Film Corporation. She also developed the idea for children's television programs such as The Miraculous Mellops and Hi-5. The idea was for a television drama set on an Australian rural property with two half-sisters running the property inherited from their father with an all-female workforce. She developed the idea from stories from friends who grew up in the country and from the love of South Australian landscapes as shown in the paintings of Hans Heysen.

Graeme-Evans pitched the idea to the board of the Nine Network, who agreed to film a telemovie in March 1996 with Jack Thompson starring as the father Jack McLeod, whose death leads to the two half-sisters (portrayed by Kym Wilson as Tess and Tammy MacIntosh as Claire) inheriting the property. The character of Jack McLeod did not appear in the series, so Claire is now running Drovers Run, with the help of her father's farmhands, following her father's death from a heart attack.

Following the success of the telemovie shown on Mother's Day 1996, the Nine Network board agreed to commission a 22-episode series, but the project was left on the shelf for four years. It was finally revived in late 2000 after the opening ceremony for the 2000 Sydney Olympics featured a The Man from Snowy River theme, which highlighted the cultural significance of the bush to Australians.

=== Casting ===
Lisa Chappell, a successful New Zealand actress, known for her role in the soap opera Gloss, was cast as Claire McLeod. The role of Claire was initially intended to go to actress Laurie Foell, for which was on hold for four months prior to the beginning of production, when Chappell, who was, at the time, in the process of setting up a theatre company, was invited to audition and received the part. Chappell was known to Australian audiences, appearing in seven episodes of Hercules: The Legendary Journeys. She is popular in New Zealand for her musical work, and has also appeared in the TV series The Stingers and The Cult. During the production of the series, she learned how to ride a horse and shear sheep.

Bridie Carter (Tess, left) and Lisa Chappell (Claire, right)

Bridie Carter, a NIDA graduate, was virtually unknown to audiences, having only appeared in few guest roles in drama series which included Home and Away, Water Rats and All Saints. However, McLeod's Daughters marks her first major screen role. Both Carter and Chappell were chosen from a number of high-profile actors in what was described as an "exhaustive casting process".

Jessica Napier was cast in the supporting role of Becky Howard, a promiscuous young woman from a broken family, who is raped and finds refuge on Drover's Run. Napier was recognised by executive producer Kris Noble while she was working on Wildside and considered her for a part on the series, for which Posie Graeme-Evans agreed. She admitted that the reason she accepted the part was because of Graeme-Evans. In an interview with the Sydney Morning Herald, she commented that "Being as passionate and in love with it as she [Graeme-Evans] has made it feel like a worthwhile project. I felt it was a project that was loved and one they would go all out to make work." Napier was a Sydney-based actor at the time and relocated to Adelaide for the part.

=== Locations ===
McLeod's Daughters is filmed on location at Kingsford, a 135-acre (55 ha) property which is listed on the South Australian Heritage Register and is located in the locality of Kingsford, north of Gawler. which Posie Graeme-Evans refers to as "our very own backlot". Kingsford was originally part of a 30,000-acre (12,245ha) property. The historical house was built from Edinburgh sandstone, transported to Australia as a ship ballast. The house took over 30 years to build and was finished by 1856.

Kingsford had been used in the years prior to filming by the South Australian Government as a wheat research station then by a Montessori school as a primary school campus. The working property was purchased by The Nine Network in 1999. Although Kingsford was a grand property in its time, it is now quite run down - a look that was important for the production design of the series, as the McLeod family has no money for maintenance.

The interior scenes set at Drover's Run are all filmed inside the house. It not only added authenticity to the production, but the large rooms and high ceilings were ideal for filming.

==== Locations in Gungellan ====
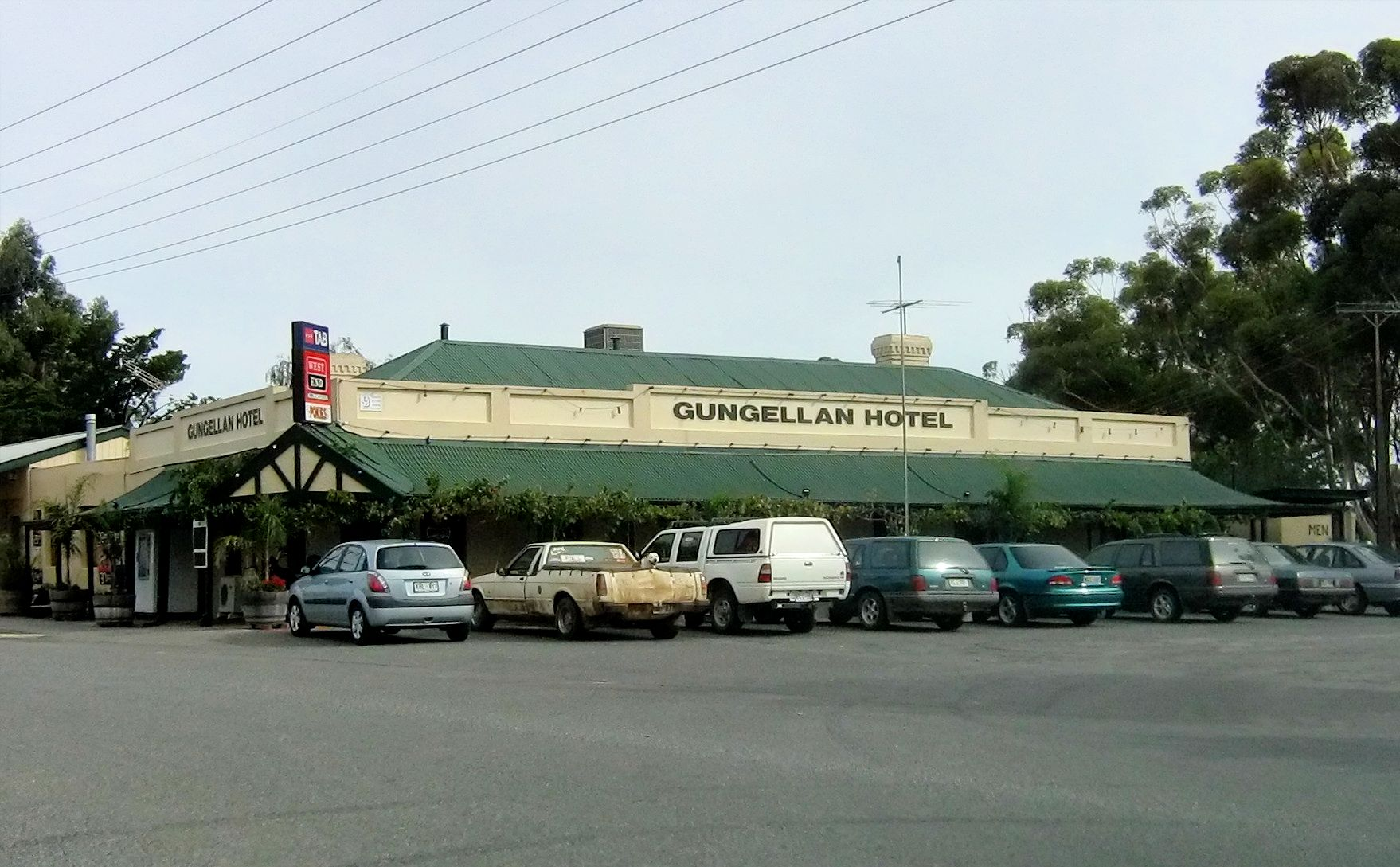
A hotel in Freeling, is painted as the "Gungellan Hotel" for a set in McLeod's Daughters.

Mostly fictional settings:

- Drover's Run – the main setting for the show. Drover's Run has been in the McLeod family for years, passed down to father, son, and now daughters. Claire McLeod, Tess McLeod, and Jodi McLeod all have run Drovers Run along with part owners Stevie Ryan, Regan McLeod and Grace McLeod.
- Killarney – also known as the Ryan Empire. At the start of the series Harry Ryan owned the property, and as he grew older his sons Alex and Nick took over. After Nick and Tess married, they left to run a ranch in Argentina. Alex ran Killarney for a couple of years, until his biological father (Bryce) became part owner of the property. On Bryce's death, half-brother Marcus became part owner of the property. In the final years of the show both Alex and Marcus own and run Killarney, although Alex became a largely absentee owner as he also began to spend much of his time on the ranch in Argentina.
- Kinsellas – a local farm that was run by Sandra Kinsella from 2003 to 2006. The name was changed after Heath Barret bought it.
- The Local Pub – (Gungellan Hotel) where everyone goes for a drink after a hard day's labour. Becky worked there in 2001, Jodi worked there briefly in 2005 and Tayler also worked there briefly in 2007. It is most likely the only pub in Gungellan.
- The Truck Stop – where most of the town buys their supplies and when they need fuel. It was first owned by Ken Logan, then his daughter Jennifer followed by Harry Ryan. When Harry was owner Terry Dodge managed it then Moira Doyle. Later on Moira and Regan McLeod went into business supplying the fuel, Phill Rakich was the last owner.
- The Town Hall – where most major events are held, such as the Miss Gungellan contest, plays, and the town's birthday celebration.
- Fisher – Gungellan's closest neighbouring town.

=== Filming ===
The show was shot on Super 16 mm film, and is the first Australian drama series to be delivered in HDTV format. Three cameras were used, two on main unit and the third on second unit. Director of photography, Roger Dowling created the illusion that the series is shot on a 50,000 hectare property in the Australian bush, instead of on a heritage estate about the size of a hobby farm.

== Cast and characters ==
=== Main ===
- Lisa Chappell as Claire Louise McLeod, is the oldest child of John 'Jack' M. Mcleod. She was born on Drover's Run, in 1973, to Jack and his first wife, Prudence 'Prue' McLeod. Prue died while giving birth to a stillborn son, Adam John McLeod, in 1975. Jack would later marry Ruth Silverman, who gave birth to Tess Silverman McLeod. (Season 1–3)
- Bridie Carter as Tess Charlotte Silverman McLeod, is the third child and second daughter of Jack McLeod. She was born on Drover's Run in 1976 to Jack and his second wife, Ruth Silverman. Tess left Drover's for Melbourne with her mother when she was five years old, after her parents' marriage ended, She returns to Drover's twenty years later following the death of her father. (Season 1–6)
- Jessica Napier as Rebecca 'Becky' Howard, is a young local who starts out working for the Gungellan Pub & Hotel. After her boss, Brian (John Sheerin), rapes her, Claire offers to put her up on Drover's and give her work. Although Becky is nearly illiterate, she hides this well, and is soon promoted to lead station hand, being a hard worker who is reliable. (Season 1–3)
- Rachael Carpani as Jodi Margaret Fountain, Jodi is the youngest child of Jack McLeod. She was born on Drover's Run in 1982 to Jack and Meg Fountain. Jack and Meg had a brief affair and were not married; their relationship and Jodi's paternity were kept secret for many years. It was assumed that Meg's first husband Kevin Fountain (Richard Healy), was Jodi's father. (Season 1–7, guest Season 8)
- Aaron Jeffery as Alexander 'Alex' Marion Ryan, is the older son of Harry (Marshall Napier) and Liz Ryan (Catherine Wilkin), the rich owners of Killarney, the large property adjacent to Drover's Run. He is a childhood friend of Claire McLeod's. (Season 1–7, guest Season 8)
- Myles Pollard as Nicholas 'Nick' Gary Ryan, is the younger son of Harry and Liz Ryan. Due to a rodeo accident in his teens that left him with scars and a limp, Nick works mostly on the business operations at Killarney, since he cannot ride horses anymore. When he feels betrayed by his father, Harry Ryan, he buys the property Wilgul and runs it mostly on his own. Against all diagnoses and medical advice, he feels he is ready to ride horses again, and succeeds. He and Claire were once unofficially engaged married at their parents' wishes. (Season 1–5, recurring Season 6)
- Sonia Todd as Margaret 'Meg' Fountain (née Rivers), is the longtime housekeeper on Drover's Run and the mother of Jodi Fountain-McLeod. Meg acts as a mother figure to the women of Drover's, though she has occasional clashes with some of the employees, notably Becky. Meg had an affair with Jack McLeod many years ago, resulting in her getting pregnant with Jodi. She keeps the affair secret from her husband Kevin Fountain, who left her at that time, came back, and left her again after Jodi was born. Her current boyfriend Terry Dodge (John Jarratt) seems to have suspected that Meg had an affair with Jack for a while. (Season 1–4, recurring Season 5–6, guest Season 7–8)
- Simmone Jade Mackinnon as Stephanie 'Stevie' Jane Hall, is an old friend of Claire and Alex, and first appears in the series shortly before Claire's death. Though she initially clashes with Tess, they grow close and Tess asks Stevie to stay on Drover's as overseer and eventually as part-owner. She has a daughter, Rose, who lives with Stevie's sister Michelle and believes that Stevie is her aunt. (Season 3–8)
- Michala Banas as Kate Marie Due Manfredi, Kate is a former classmate of Jodi's. She first appears in the series when Jodi decides to go to Melbourne with Meg, leaving a job vacancy. Though Jodi changes her mind at the last minute and stays on the farm, Kate keeps her new position, and soon they are back being best friends like they used to be in school. Kate is organized and goal-oriented, often referring to her "5-year plan". She brings quite the organization and knowledge to Drover's, but occasionally she has the other farmhands rolling their eyes. (Season 4–8)
- Brett Tucker as David 'Dave' Enoch Brewer, is a country veterinarian who tends to the animals on Drover's Run and other farms in the area. He is briefly engaged to Tess, though they break off the engagement when Dave realizes that he has not properly mourned his late wife Leanne. He leaves in an effort to work out his feelings, but when he returns after nearly a year, Tess does not take him back as she and Nick are in the process of getting together. Dave moves into Wilgul with Alex and becomes a staple part of the social group. (Season 4–6, recurring Season 3)
- Jonny Pasvolsky as Rob Shelton / Matt Bosnich, is the new overseer for Killarney who seems highly capable as well as being a loner. His choice for loneliness, while hiding quite a few secrets, becomes gradually understandable. Jodi is convinced that Rob is gay, but later realises that he is not, yet there is more to his mysterious past than meets the eye. (Season 5–6, recurring Season 7)
- Luke Jacobz as Patrick Michael Brewer, is the younger brother of Dave Brewer. He makes his first appearance in the series by parachuting onto Drover's. Patrick is an adventurous world traveller. He has a short relationship with Kate early on, but when he stops taking his medication for bipolar disorder, he has a manic episode, which initially frightens Kate off. After Dave finally tells him the truth about their father's death, their relationship strengthens, and he leaves Gungellan to stay with his mother, and work on getting better at handling his bipolar disorder. After a while he returns to Gungellan and rekindles the relationship with Kate. (Season 6–8, guest Season 5)
- Zoe Naylor as Regan McLeod, Regan is the second daughter of Hugh McLeod, Jack McLeod's younger brother who was first engaged to Prudence. Regan arrives at Drover's under suspicious circumstances, later revealing that she has come to conduct tests and surveys to determine if Drover's can be mined for gold. She begins digging, which is legal, getting into several confrontations with Tess, and the other Drover's women. After she is bitten by a venomous snake, Tess helps save her life and Regan decides to abandon her plans to mine Drover's, making peace with her cousin. (Season 6–7, recurring Season 5 & 8)
- Gillian Alexy as Tayler Jane Geddes, first appears at the end of season 6, when she comes to Drover's looking to get revenge on Regan. Regan was supervising a mine when an accident killed two men, one of which was Tayler's father. Regan and the other women, with some aid by Patrick, convince Tayler to stay on at Drover's as a farm hand. Although she is not certain about this decision and how welcome she truly is at Drover's, she has nowhere else to go, and indeed stays on. (Season 7–8, guest Season 6)
- Dustin Clare as Riley Ward, is a farrier and horse gentler who left the army, and first appears in season 6, when Stevie discovers him squatting on Drover's. After some initial clashes with the people from Drover's and Killarney, Riley and Stevie start a programme to capture and train brumbies. Riley also becomes the overseer of Killarney. (Season 7, recurring Season 6)
- Matt Passmore as Marcus Turner, first arrives at Killarney in the beginning of season 7, working for Bryce Redstaff to go over the books and look for ways to increase profit, recovering Bryce's investment. Bryce has more than one agenda in this, and since Bryce does not want to tell Alex himself, he leaves Marcus no other choice than to later reveal to Alex that he is also Bryce's son and therefore his (younger) brother. Though he and Alex initially clash, they later grow close, while Marcus does his best to fit in, and to develop into a good farmer. (Season 7–8)
- Abi Tucker as Grace Kingston, is the eldest of Hugh McLeod's daughters, sister to Regan and Jasmine, cousin to Jodi, Tess and Claire. She is a Campdrafting champion under the name Grace Kingston (her mother's maiden name) and an old friend of Stevie Hall. She reluctantly joins Drover's after receiving her share in Jodi's 'will'. Grace is a loose cannon, acting before thinking, and stuffs up a few times in her initial adjustment to being at Drover's. Her relationship with Regan is complicated and they are often at odds. (Season 7–8)
- Doris Younane as Moira Doyle (Season 7–8, guest Season 2–3, recurring Season 5–6)
- Edwina Ritchard as Jaz McLeod, Jaz is the youngest of Hugh McLeod's daughters. She is the first McLeod cousin to appear in the series, showing up near the end of season 4 (played by Anna Torv) for two episodes. She comes to Drover's to heal from losing her fiancé in a show jumping accident, and to spread her father's ashes on Drover's, a property she thought solely existed in stories her father used to tell. (Season 8)
- John Schwarz as Ben Hall, is Stevie's cousin, and first appears in season 8 on the same bus into Gungellan as Jaz, showing up to support Stevie after Alex's death. He finds work at Killarney, where he regularly clashes with Marcus, however he seems knowledgeable enough as well. (Season 8)

=== Recurring cast and characters ===
- John Jarratt as Terry Dodge (Season 1–6)
- Marshall Napier as Harry Ryan (Season 1–6)
- Fletcher Humphrys as Brett "Brick" Buchanan (seasons 1–3)
- Catherine Wilkin as Liz Ryan (Season 1–4, 6)
- Luke Ford as Craig Woodland (seasons 1–4)
- Richard Wilson as Sean Howard (seasons 1–2)
- Rodger Corser as Peter Johnson (seasons 1–4)
- Ben Mortley as Alberto Borelli (seasons 1–3)
- Richard Healy as Kevin Fountain (seasons 2–3, 6)
- Inge Hornstra as Sandra Kinsella (seasons 2–6)
- Kathryn Hartman as Sally Clements (seasons 2–6)
- Charlie Clausen as Jake Harrison (seasons 2–3)
- John Stanton as Bryce Redstaff (seasons 3–4, 6–7)
- Basia A'Hern as Rose Hall-Smith (seasons 4–8)
- Craig McLachlan as Kane Morgan (season 4)
- Dean O'Gorman as Luke Morgan (seasons 4–5)
- Michelle Langstone as Fiona Webb (season 6)
- Dan Feuerriegel as Leo Coombes (season 6)
- Peter Hardy as Phil Rakich (seasons 6–8)
- Rachael Coopes as Ingrid Marr (seasons 7–8)

=== Guest appearances ===
Notable guest appearances include: Chris Haywood, Max Cullen, Alexandra Davies, Murray Bartlett, Deborah Kennedy, Celia Ireland, Tim Campbell, Brooke Harman, Peter Cousens, Stephen Curry, Xavier Samuel, Gabby Millgate, Belinda Bromilow, Jeremy Lindsay Taylor, Tasma Walton, Glenda Linscott, Neil Melville, Josh Quong Tart, Rachael Taylor, Jeremy Sims, Sonja Tallis, Orpheus Pledger, Simone Buchanan, Rebecca Lavelle, Todd Lasance, Kain O'Keeffe, Adam Saunders, Liam Hemsworth, Jay Laga'aia, Luke Arnold, Spencer McLaren, Callan Mulvey, Craig Stott, Leah Purcell, Carole Skinner, Peter Howitz and Nicholas Bishop.

=== Main cast changes ===
The first three seasons follow the lives of half-sisters Claire McLeod and Tess Silverman McLeod, farmhands Jodi Fountain and Becky Howard, Jodi's mother and Drovers Run housekeeper Meg Fountain, and their affluent neighbours, the Ryan family.

The cast remained the same until the third season, when it was announced that Jessica Napier would be leaving. Her character, Becky Howard, initially decided to take a job at another farm with her boyfriend Jake, but then changed her mind and went back to school on the Agricultural Scholarship she had won during the young farmers competition. News of a second major cast change hit when it was announced that Lisa Chappell, who played Claire McLeod, would be leaving the series. Claire, Tess, and baby Charlotte were involved in a car accident, with Tess and Charlotte making it to safety before their vehicle slid over a cliff, killing Claire. Simmone Jade Mackinnon's character, Stevie Hall, was introduced to replace Chappell.

Season four began with the promotion of Brett Tucker to series regular. A new farm-hand, Kate Manfredi, was introduced in the fourteenth episode of season four. The introduction of Kate was to accommodate the departure of Meg, who left to pursue a writing job in Melbourne. She remained credited as a main character until the end of season 5.

When the show began to decrease in ratings in the fifth season, producers decided to introduce several new characters to try and liven up the show. They brought in the no-nonsense, secretive Rob Shelton who was employed as the overseer at Killarney; the geologist cousin of Tess and Jodi, Regan McLeod; and the troubled brother of Dave, Patrick Brewer. Even with these cast changes, the show suffered another major blow when Myles Pollard announced that he was leaving the show to pursue other opportunities in the USA. His character, Nick Ryan was supposedly killed in a plane crash.

Ratings started to rise in the sixth season, when it took on a more soap opera-type style, while staying true to the original premise of the show. This was the last season before the show began its downhill slope. After four seasons, recurring character Moria Doyle (played by Doris Younane) was promoted to series regular to replace Meg Fountain. Pollard returned briefly when it was revealed that Nick had not died in a plane crash, but had actually been unconscious in a hospital in Argentina. Bridie Carter also decided to leave the show, departing with Pollard when their characters returned to Argentina. This saw the return and promotion to the main cast of Regan McLeod. Another blow was dealt when Jonny Pasvolsky decided to quit. His character, Rob Shelton/Matt Bosnich, had to leave Gungellan when he was found by the hitmen who had been pursuing him. The return of Zoe Naylor's character, Regan McLeod was to accommodate the departure of Tess, however this had no impact. The ratings started to slip and two more characters were introduced: the replacement overseer for Killarney, Riley Ward, and the immature Tayler Geddes, whose father died in an explosion at a mine where Regan worked. The final episode saw Brett Tucker's character Dave Brewer depart the series to work as a vet in Africa and the temporary departure of Michala Banas's character, Kate Manfredi.

The seventh season saw the introduction of Marcus Turner, who was employed as an account manager by Bryce Redstaff, Alex's biological father. It was later revealed that Marcus was Alex's half-brother. The seventh season also saw the return of Matt Bosnich, who was free to continue his life outside of witness protection. The news, however, that Rachael Carpani was departing the show and her character Jodi McLeod, along with Matt, would be written out was soon announced and Matt and Jodi were "killed" in a car explosion. It later turned out that they were alive, but used a car explosion to cover up this fact so they could go into witness protection. To compensate for Carpani's departure, Abi Tucker's character Grace Kingston McLeod was introduced as the feisty sister of Regan and cousin of Jodi. Michala Banas's character Kate was written back in as was Sonia Todd's character Meg Fountain, however the latter departed soon after. It was announced that not only would Zoe Naylor be leaving, but so would the last remaining original cast member, Aaron Jeffery, though they would both return. Regan left to run a mine, while Alex left to help Nick and Tess in Argentina. A new vet, Ingrid Marr, was introduced to stir up trouble between Grace and Marcus. Dustin Clare's character Riley Ward was killed in a car accident at the end of season seven.

The departure of Michala Banas rocked the crew of McLeod's Daughters and her character was written out to work on a farm for at-risk youth. Aaron Jeffery returned for one episode in season eight, where his character Alex Ryan was killed when a large tree branch fell on him. Regan returned for the christening of baby Xander, who was born the day after Alex died. Stevie's fun-loving cousin Ben Hall was introduced as the new overseer of Killarney, replacing Riley, while the vivacious sister of Regan and Grace, Jaz McLeod returned to Drovers Run after making a guest appearance in season four. The series finale saw Sonia Todd and Rachael Carpani return as Meg Fountain and Jodi McLeod respectively.

== Overview ==
Season	Episodes	Originally released		Ave. viewers (millions)
Season	Episodes	First released	Last released	Ave. viewers (millions)
Pilot		11 May 1996		TBA
1	22	8 August 2001	20 March 2002	1.51
2	22	27 March 2002	16 October 2002	1.41
3	30	12 February 2003	29 October 2003	1.50
4	32	11 February 2004	24 November 2004	1.51
5	32	9 February 2005	23 November 2005	1.35
6	32	15 February 2006	29 November 2006	1.31
7	32	7 February 2007	17 October 2007	1.18
8	22	23 July 2008	31 January 2009	0.63

The first season's storylines included:

- The reunion of Claire and Tess
- Meg's and Terry's forbidden romance
- Becky's rape and subsequent pregnancy scare
- Tess's dream to own a cafe
- Liz's disapproval of Tess
- Brick's and Becky's relationship
- The mystery behind Nick's limp
- Jodi's and Alberto's blossoming romance

The second season's storylines included:

- Claire's and Peter's romance
- The arrival of Jodi's father
- Tess leaves to run her cafe
- Alberto's return from Italy
- Brick's disappearance
- Sandra's arrival
- Alex's and Nick's infatuation with Tess
- Claire's pregnancy

The third season's storylines included:

- Alex and Claire's sexual tension
- Jodi and Alberto's marriage and subsequent annulment
- Becky's quest for Brick and new romance with Jake
- The sexual tension between Nick and Tess
- The birth of Claire's baby, Charlotte
- Sally and Nick's relationship
- Dave and Tess' relationship
- Sandra's meddling and romance with Alex
- The departure of Becky
- Tess' cancer scare
- The arrival of Stevie Hall
- Claire's car crash and her death
- Tess' quest: run Drover's single-handedly

The fourth season's storylines included:

- Stevie's promotion to part-owner
- Nick and Tess' relationship and eventual marriage
- The custody battle for Charlotte
- Meg's decision to leave Drover's
- The introduction of Kate Manfredi
- Sandra's pregnancy and subsequent miscarriage
- Jodi's relationship with Luke and her work with the CFS
- The brief arrival of cousin Jasmine
- The birth of Sally and Nick's son, Harrison

The fifth season's storylines included:

- The disintegration and eventual reconciliation of Tess and Nick's marriage
- Regan McLeod's arrival and plans to mine Drover's
- Stevie and Alex's growing affection for one another
- The introduction of mysterious farm-hand Rob Shelton
- Meg's book publication
- Stevie's decision to tell Rose the truth
- The arrival of Dave's mentally-unstable little brother, Patrick
- Nick's presumed death
- Jodi's discovery that her father is Jack McLeod

The sixth season's storylines included:

- The discovery of Rob's witness protection secret
- Harry's murder and the subsequent police investigation
- The love triangle between Stevie, Alex and Fiona
- Nick's return and his departure with Tess
- Meg and Terry's engagement and wedding
- Regan's return and subsequent gain of Drover's
- Rose's work experience
- The arrival of the arrogant Riley Ward
- Dave and Kate's departure to Africa

The seventh season's storylines included:

- Rob/Matt's return and his and Jodi's relationship followed by their presumed death
- Moira and Phil's relationship
- Regan's departure
- Alex and Stevie's engagement and wedding
- The introduction of Grace McLeod and Marcus Turner
- Kate's return and her developing relationship with Riley
- Ashleigh's arrival and deception
- Rose's fall and subsequent paralysis
- Tayler and Patrick's growing friendship
- Stevie's pregnancy
- Riley's presumed death

The eighth and final season's storylines included:

- Kate's departure
- Alex's return, tragic death and the birth of his and Stevie's son
- The Grace-Marcus-Ingrid love triangle
- Jaz McLeod's return and Ben Hall's introduction
- The production of a controversial dam
- Ben and Jaz's relationship
- The return of Ingrid's violent husband
- Phil's musical about Moira's life
- Drover's Run's financial crisis

== Reception ==
The first episode of McLeod's Daughters eventually debuted in August 2001 and proved to be a hit, attracting 1.89 million viewers. The first season was a success, attracting an average of 1.5 million viewers per episode in Australia. The show aired in New Zealand on TV2, one of TVNZ's free-to-air channels. The final season on TV2 began airing a month after Australia and eventually became 10 episodes in front of Australia until the finale. Reruns from season one are currently on Vibe in New Zealand, a channel aimed at women's programming.

The second season of McLeod's Daughters was equally successful, being the third-most popular drama on Australian television. By 2003, the show was the most popular drama series on Australian television. Its popularity in Australia was highlighted when the show won four Logie Awards, including Lisa Chappell winning most popular female actor and Aaron Jeffery winning most popular actor, with the show itself winning most popular Australian drama series in 2004 and 2005.

The show then began to decline in popularity and perceived quality. Cast turnover was high, and increasingly far-fetched stories were used to explain the sudden departure of formerly important characters, such as Rachael Carpani, who departed in 2007 and Aaron Jeffery, who left in 2008. In 2007, many viewers considered the show to have "jumped the shark", as the show had drifted into a new direction, that of a soap opera; at that point, the show began to experience low ratings. Jeffery commented to The Daily Telegraph that his desire to depart from the show was due to the new direction the show was taking, which he did not like.

The 200th episode of McLeod's Daughters aired on 3 October 2007, with Hugh McLeod (Grace, Jasmine, and Regan's father) returning for this special event. An entirely different script was originally written when one of the original cast (speculated to be Bridie Carter) agreed to come back, but it was pulled at the last minute. Ratings for this episode were very poor by Australian standards, with only 1,008,000 viewers tuning in; the highest that season was 1,415,000 for episode 16.

The eighth and final season began on 23 July 2008 with the episode 203, "Aftermath", but after two further episodes, Channel 9 pulled the show from its schedule due to extremely low ratings. The remaining episodes were eventually aired from December to January in a double-episode format, with the final two episodes ("Into the Valley of the Shadow" and "The Long Paddock") airing on 31 January 2009 with original cast members returning for the special event.

In May 2020, McLeod's Daughters was voted the number one show during the "Great Australian Binge".

=== Ratings ===
Season	Timeslot	No. of Episodes	First aired	Last aired	Rank	Avg. viewers (millions)
1	Wednesday 7:30 pm	22	8 August 2001	20 March 2002	7	1.51
2	Wednesday 7:30 pm	22	27 March 2002	16 October 2002	10	1.41
3	Wednesday 7:30 pm	30	12 February 2003	29 October 2003	6	1.50
4	Wednesday 7:30 pm	32	11 February 2004	24 November 2004	3 (Note: The series was the #1 drama series in 2004)	1.51
5	Wednesday 7:30 pm	32	9 February 2005	23 November 2005	6 (Note: The series was the #1 drama series in 2005)	1.35
6	Wednesday 7:30 pm	32	15 February 2006	29 November 2006	5 (Note: The series was the #2 drama series in 2006)	1.31
7	Wednesday 7:30 pm	32	7 February 2007	17 October 2007	11 (Note: The series was the #4 drama series in 2007)	1.18
8	Wednesday 8:30 pm (1–3), Saturday 8:30 pm (4–6), 10:00 pm (7–8), 9:30 pm (9–22)	22	23 July 2008	31 January 2009	29 (Note: The series was the #9 drama series in 2008)	0.63

=== Awards and nominations ===
Year	Association	Category	Nominee	Result	Ref
2002 (Note: Logie Awards for Season 1)	Logie Awards	Most Popular Australian Program	McLeod's Daughters	Nominated	
2002	Logie Awards	Most Popular New Female Talent	Lisa Chappell	Won	
2003 (Note: Logie Awards for Season 2)	Logie Awards	Most Popular Personality on Australian Television	Lisa Chappell	Nominated	
2003	Logie Awards	Most Popular Actress	Bridie Carter	Nominated	
2003	Logie Awards	Most Popular Actress	Lisa Chappell	Nominated	
2003	Logie Awards	Most Popular Actor	Myles Pollard	Nominated	
2003	Logie Awards	Most Popular Australian Program	McLeod's Daughters	Nominated	
2003	Logie Awards	Most Popular New Male Talent	Ben Mortley	Nominated	
2004 (Note: Logie Awards for Season 3)	AFI Awards (Note: AFI Awards for Season 3)	Best Television Drama Series	McLeod's Daughters	Nominated	
2004	Logie Awards	Most Popular Personality on Australian Television	Lisa Chappell	Nominated	
2004	Logie Awards	Most Popular Actress	Bridie Carter	Nominated	
2004	Logie Awards	Most Popular Actress	Lisa Chappell	Won	
2004	Logie Awards	Most Popular Actor	Aaron Jeffery	Won	
2004	Logie Awards	Most Popular Actor	Myles Pollard	Nominated	
2004	Logie Awards	Most Popular Australian Program	McLeod's Daughters	Won	
2004	Logie Awards	Most Popular Australian Drama Series	McLeod's Daughters	Won	
2004	Logie Awards	Most Popular New Female Talent	Simmone Jade Mackinnon	Nominated	
2004	Logie Awards	Most Outstanding Drama Series	McLeod's Daughters	Nominated	
2004	Logie Awards	Most Outstanding Actress	Bridie Carter	Nominated	
2005 (Note: Logie Awards for Season 4)	Logie Awards	Most Popular Personality on Australian Television	Bridie Carter	Nominated	
2005	Logie Awards	Most Popular Actress	Bridie Carter	Nominated	
2005	Logie Awards	Most Popular Actor	Aaron Jeffery	Nominated	
2005	Logie Awards	Most Popular Australian Drama Series	McLeod's Daughters	Won	
2005	Logie Awards	Most Popular New Male Talent	Dean O'Gorman	Nominated	
2006 (Note: Logie Awards for Season 5)	AFI Awards (Note: AFI Awards for Season 6)	Best Television Drama Series	McLeod's Daughters	Nominated	
2006	Logie Awards	Most Popular Personality on Australian Television	Bridie Carter	Nominated	
2006	Logie Awards	Most Popular Actress	Bridie Carter	Nominated	
2006	Logie Awards	Most Popular Actor	Aaron Jeffery	Nominated	
2006	Logie Awards	Most Popular Australian Drama Series	McLeod's Daughters	Nominated	
2006	Logie Awards	Most Popular New Male Talent	Jonny Pasvolsky	Nominated	
2006	Logie Awards	Most Outstanding Drama Series	McLeod's Daughters	Nominated	
2007 (Note: Logie Awards for Season 6)	Logie Awards	Most Popular Personality on Australian Television	Simmone Jade Mackinnon	Nominated	
2007	Logie Awards	Most Popular Actress	Rachael Carpani	Nominated	
2007	Logie Awards	Most Popular Actress	Simmone Jade Mackinnon	Nominated	
2007	Logie Awards	Most Popular Actor	Aaron Jeffery	Won	
2007	Logie Awards	Most Popular Australian Drama Series	McLeod's Daughters	Nominated	
2007	Logie Awards	Most Popular New Female Talent	Michelle Langstone	Nominated	
2007	Logie Awards	Most Popular New Male Talent	Dustin Clare	Won	
2008 (Note: Logie Awards for Season 7)	Logie Awards	Most Popular Actress	Simmone Jade Mackinnon	Nominated	
2008	Logie Awards	Most Popular Australian Drama Series	McLeod's Daughters	Nominated	
2009 (Note: Logie Awards for Season 8)	APRA Awards	Best Music for a Television Series or Serial	Alastair Ford (Note: APRA Music Award win for Episode 224: "The Long Paddock")	Won	
2009	Logie Awards	Most Popular Personality on Australian Television	Simmone Jade Mackinnon	Nominated	
2009	Logie Awards	Most Popular Actress	Simmone Jade Mackinnon	Nominated	
2009	Logie Awards	Most Popular Australian Drama Series	McLeod's Daughters	Nominated	

=== Honours ===
Year	Association			Result	Ref
2023	TV Week	100 Greatest Australian TV Characters	Tess McLeod	22nd place	
2023	TV Week	100 Greatest Australian TV Characters	Claire McLeod	23rd place	
2026	TV Week	70 Best Australian TV Shows of All Time	McLeod's Daughters	6th place	

== International broadcast ==
Following its instant success in Australia, Mcleod's Daughters was sold to over 100 countries, most notably, the American-based Hallmark Channel, which was available in several international countries, including Australia, Asia, and European countries, with time and broadcast dates varying. The series premiered in the UK on the Hallmark Channel in Autumn 2001, originally in a weekend primetime slot. Due to its growing success, Hallmark secured the rights to the third season in 2002 and the fourth season in 2003, which were then scheduled for 26 and 30 episodes, respectively, before being extended. The third season eventually screened from 28 August 2003 on the network, while season four commenced in 2004. During the later years of the series, it was moved from its primetime slot to an 11 am morning slot. The final season began airing in the UK Hallmark on 12 October 2008 with double episodes every Sunday morning from 11:00 am to 1:00 pm. The final two episode aired in the UK on Sunday 21 December 2008, a month before the episodes aired in Australia.

In Germany, the final two episodes aired on 4 November 2008 in a German-dubbed-version, a month before airing in the UK in the original language. In Ireland, RTÉ Two began airing the final season in mid-2010 in a late-nighttime slot, with the final episode airing early 2011. This was the first time season 8 had been shown on the channel, as RTÉ had long period gaps between each season. In early 2011, the channel began airing the series from the beginning but was stopped less than halfway through the first season. In the US, the series debuted on 2 October 2004 on the WE tv (Women's Entertainment) cable channel, and ran for several seasons.

It is also one of the successful Nine Network show to air in foreign markets behind Skippy, The Sullivans, The Young Doctors, The Flying Doctors, Halifax FP, Water Rats, Stingers, HI-5, Underbelly and Doctor Doctor.

== Home media ==
=== VHS ===
McLeod's Daughters Australian VHS release
Season	Length	Episodes
1	5 VHS tapes	1–22
2	5 VHS tapes	23–44
3	6 VHS tapes	45–74
4	7 VHS tapes	75–106

=== DVD ===
Title	Release date		Additional
Title	Region 1	Region 4	Additional
The Complete First Series	3 October 2006	10 September 2003	Features: 22 episodes; 6-DVD set (region 1 & 4); 1.78:1 aspect ratio; English (Dolby Digital 5.1); Rated: M; Special features: Original TV movie; The Inside Story (behind-the-scenes featurette); Interviews with Posie Graeme-Evans, Andrew Blaxland and Karl Zwicky
The Complete Second Series	8 May 2007	14 July 2004	Features: 22 episodes; 6-DVD set (region 1 & 4); 1.78:1 aspect ratio; English (Dolby Digital 5.1); Rated: M; Special features: None
The Complete Third Series	14 August 2007	13 April 2005	Features: 30 episodes; 6-DVD set (region 4); 8-DVD set (region 1); 1.78:1 aspect ratio; English (Dolby Digital 5.1); Rated: M; Special features: None
The Complete Fourth Series	6 November 2007	12 October 2005	Features: 32 episodes; 7-DVD set (region 4); 8-DVD set (region 1); 1.78:1 aspect ratio; English (Dolby Digital 5.1); Rated: M; Special features: None
The Complete Fifth Series	5 February 2008	3 May 2006	Features: 32 episodes; 7-DVD set (region 4); 8-DVD set (region 1); 1.78:1 aspect ratio; English (Dolby Digital 5.1); Rated: PG; Special features: None
The Complete Sixth Series	10 June 2008	11 April 2007	Features: 32 episodes; 7-DVD set (region 4); 8-DVD set (region 1); 1.78:1 aspect ratio; English (Dolby Digital 5.1); Rated: M; Special features: None
The Complete Seventh Series	9 December 2008	30 April 2008	Features: 32 episodes; 7-DVD set (region 4); 8-DVD set (region 1); 1.78:1 aspect ratio; English (Dolby Digital 5.1); Rated: M; Special features: None
The Complete Eighth & Final Series	5 May 2009	3 November 2008	Features: 22 episodes; 6-DVD set (region 1 & 4); 1.78:1 aspect ratio; English (Dolby Digital 5.1); Rated: M; Special features: Interviews with Posie Graeme-Evans and cast
The Complete Saga (Limited Edition)	—N/a	3 November 2008	Features: 224 episodes; 52-DVD Limited Edition wooden chest set (region 4); 1.78:1 aspect ratio; English (Dolby Digital 5.1); Rated: M
The Complete Saga (Standard Edition)	—N/a	23 November 2009	Features: 224 episodes; 52-DVD set re-release standard packaging set (region 4); 1.78:1 aspect ratio; English (Dolby Digital 5.1); Rated: M; The standard set was also reissued on 30 October 2012.
Collection One (Series 1–4)	—N/a	18 October 2023	Features: 106 episodes; 25-DVD set; 1.78:1 aspect ratio; Rated: M
Collection Two (Series 5–8)	—N/a	8 November 2023	Features: 118 episodes; 27-DVD set; 1.78:1 aspect ratio; Rated: M
The Complete Series	—N/a	4 September 2024	Features: 224 episodes; 52-DVD set; 1.78:1 aspect ratio; Rated: M

=== Soundtrack ===
Three albums, selected from the music from the series, were released in 2002, 2004, and 2008.

=== Streaming ===
In Australia, the complete series is available to stream on 9Now, and Stan. In New Zealand, it is available via TVNZ+. Netflix made all 8 seasons available to US subscribers in 2009. The series was available to stream in the UK via Amazon Prime Video's main subscription service before moving to Amazon Freevee, a free ad-based service from Amazon. It can also be streamed on the UK's STV Player. It is available in multiple countries on Pluto TV, where it features a McLeod's Daughters channel and the entire series on demand.

== Revival series ==
=== Failed reboot ===
On 6 July 2017, the Nine Network confirmed that they were in talks with Posie Graeme-Evans about a potential reboot of the series. On 6 September 2017, Posie Graeme-Evans announced, "We have a story now, and I think it's a cracker. Just finishing the work we need to do before I talk about the next steps with the network." On 23 October 2017, Posie Graeme-Evans announced she had ended negotiations with Nine as creative differences for a new series remained, but has not ruled out potentially crowd-funding her project.

=== Official revival ===
In September 2026, it was confirmed a revival series will premiere on Stan in 2027. The series will be produced by Werner Film productions.

== See also ==
- List of Australian television series
- The Saddle Club
