= Nine Television =

Australian television production company

- Trade name: Nine
- Type: Subsidiary
- Industry: Television
- Predecessor: Nine Network
- Products: Television
- Parent: Nine Entertainment
- Website: Nine Plus

Nine Television is the television arm of Nine Entertainment.

== Channels ==
- Nine Network, an Australian commercial free-to-air television primary channel
  - Sydney, Melbourne, Brisbane, Adelaide, Perth, Darwin, Northern NSW and Gold Coast
- 9HD is an Australian free-to-air HD digital television multichannel using the primary channel simulcast
- 9Gem is an Australian free-to-air digital television multichannel suitable for sport and entertainment
- 9Go! is an Australian free-to-air digital television multichannel aimed at 14- to 39-year-olds.
- 9Life is an Australian free-to-air digital television multichannel featuring reality and lifestyle programs
- 9Rush is an Australian free-to-air digital television multichannel aimed at a 25- to 54-year-old male audience. (joint venture with Warner Bros. Discovery)
- 10 Darwin (50% joint venture with Seven West Media, Network 10 affiliate)
- 9Now a video on demand, catch-up TV service which carries the main and multichannels of the Nine Network

== Production ==
Nine Films and Television is the in-house film and television production arm of the Nine Network.

It produces content primarily for the network and its affiliated network WIN, but also produces feature films for release in cinemas. Nine Films and Television has produced a few television programs for the network, including:

- Getaway
- Wimbledon Tennis coverage (with Wide World of Sports)
- Survivor (with CBS)

Former productions

- In Melbourne Tonight (1957–1970)
- Bandstand (1958–1972)
- The Graham Kennedy Show (1972, 1973–1975)
- The Ernie Sigley Show (1974–1981, 1985)
- The Don Lane Show (1975–1983)
- The Bert Newton Show (1984)
- The Midday Show (1985–1998)
- Graham Kennedy’s News Show (1988)
- Graham Kennedy Coast To Coast (1989)
- The AFL Footy Show (1994–2019)
- In Melbourne Tonight (1996–1998)
- Micallef Tonight (2003)
- TV Week Logie Awards (1973–1980, 1982, 1984, 1986, 1988, 1991, 1994, 1996–2022)

Former Shared productions

- Hi-5 (1999–2012, co-production with Kids Like Us)
- Cushion Kids (2000–2001, co-production with Kids Like Us)
- New MacDonald's Farm (2004–2007, co-production with Beyond Australia)
- Farscape (1999–2003, co-production with Hallmark Entertainment and The Jim Henson Company)
- McLeod's Daughters (2001–2009, co-production with Southern Star)
- Water Rats (1996–2001, co-production with Southern Star)
