= Simmone Jade Mackinnon =

Australian actress (born 1973)

- Born: March 19, 1973 (age 53); Mount Isa, Queensland, Australia
- Occupation: Actress
- Years active: 1988–present
- Notable work: Baywatch (1999–2000); McLeod's Daughters (2003-2009)
- Children: 1

Simmone Jade Mackinnon (born 19 March 1973) is an Australian actress. She is best known for her roles as Allie Reese on Baywatch Hawaii (1999–2000) and Stevie Hall on McLeod's Daughters (2003–2009).

== Early life ==
Mackinnon was born in Mount Isa, Queensland in 1973 to Ian and Annette Mackinnon. She has a brother and a sister, Robbie and Kym. She and her family later moved to Coffs Harbour in New South Wales.

== Career ==
Mackinnon began her acting career in 1988, appearing in the Australian feature film Something About Love. Two further features followed, Dating the Enemy and Dust of the Wings, where she appeared in small roles, although her role in Dust of the Wing was a larger part. In 1997, she began to appear on television. She had a guest appearance on the fantasy television series Spellbinder: Land of the Dragon Lord, a sequel to the original series Spellbinder. Mackinnon is known for her role in Baywatch: Hawaii, where she played the role of 'Allie Reese' opposite David Hasselhoff. MacKinnon is best known for her role as 'Stevie Hall' (later 'Hall-Ryan') in the Logie Award-winning Australian television series McLeod's Daughters, where she appeared at the end of season three through the final season in 2009. Her role as Stevie earned her several Logie Award nominations, for Most Popular New Female Talent and Most Popular Actress. In 2007 & 2009, she received Gold Logie Award nominations. Mackinnon's other television work includes roles on Water Rats, All Saints, Sir Arthur Conan Doyle's The Lost World, The Cut, Rescue: Special Ops, Cops L.A.C. and City Homicide. In 2001, she appeared with Powers Boothe in the television mini-series Attila, which also featured Gerard Butler, and in 2003, she starred in the Syfy television film Deep Shock. Mackinnon also played roles in three direct-to-video films, Python, Dark Waters and Submission, for which she also served as producer.

From 1993 to 1995 she toured with the musical Cats (in the role of the cat "Cassandra") through Australia and Asia. In June 2009, Mackinnon appeared as a presenter alongside host Karl Stefanovic and Scott Cam in Random Acts of Kindness on the Nine Network. Mackinnon completed a second season of Random Acts of Kindness in January 2010.

On 4 March 2012, it was announced Mackinnon had joined the cast of Neighbours as Zoe Alexander. The actress began appearing on screen in May and relocated to Melbourne for filming.

On 30 April 2024, it was announced that Mackinnon will join the reality television series The Summit, as a contestant for its second season, which premiered on 12 May 2024 on Nine Network. This marked the first time Mackinnon had appeared on screen in twelve years. Mackinnon, along with two other contestants, completed The Summit in the season finale, as she walked away with $100,000.

== Personal life ==
Mackinnon gave birth to her first child, a son, on 19 March 2010, her 37th birthday.

Dogs have always been a part of her life. She was named an RSPCA superhero "for giving love, respect and support to all animals." As a child traveling with her parents, she found an abandoned Australian Cattle Dog, and since then has had ACDs in her life. Her current dogs are Duke and Kevin.

== Filmography ==
=== Film ===
Year	Title	Role	Notes
1988	Something About Love	Therapist	Feature film
1996	Dating the Enemy	Doctor's Assistant	Feature film
1997	Dust Off the Wings	Mel	Feature film
2002	Python II	Nalia	TV film
2003	Deep Shock	Dr. Anne Fletcher	TV film
2003	Dark Waters	Robin Turner	Direct to video
2006	Submission	Dominique	Producer; direct-to-video

=== Television ===
Year	Title	Role	Type
1997	Spellbinder: Land of the Dragon Lord	TV Girl	Season 1, episode 8
1998	Water Rats	Bianca Mathias	Season 3, episode 26
1998	All Saints	The Stripper (uncredited)	Season 1, episode 41
1999	All Saints	Krystal Woods	Season 2, episode 6
1999	Sir Arthur Conan Doyle's The Lost World	Elura	Season 1, episode 4
1999–2000	Baywatch	Allie Reese	Season 9, episodes 16 & 17 (guest); Season 10 (main, 22 episodes)
2001	Attila	N'kara / Ildico	Miniseries (direct-to-video)
2003–2009	McLeod's Daughters	Stevie Hall (Hall-Ryan)	Seasons 3–8 (main, 154 episodes)
2009	The Cut	Dominica Blaine	Season 1, episode 4
2009	Rescue: Special Ops	Fiona Charlton	Season 1 (recurring, 5 episodes)
2009–2011	Random Acts of Kindness	Herself (presenter)	Seasons 1–2
2010	Cops L.A.C.	Justine Taylor	Season 1, episode 5
2010	City Homicide	Liz Chisholm	Season 4, episode 20
2012	Neighbours	Zoe Alexander	Season 28 (recurring, 18 episodes)
2024	The Summit	Herself (contestant)	Season 2

== Awards and nominations ==
Year	Award	Category	Nominated work	Result	Ref.
2004	Logie Awards	Most Popular New Female Talent	McLeods Daughters (Season 3)	Nominated	
2007	Logie Awards	Most Popular Actress	McLeods Daughters (Season 6)	Nominated	
2007	Logie Awards	Most Popular Personality on Australian Television	McLeods Daughters (Season 6)	Nominated	
2008	Logie Awards	Most Popular Actress	McLeods Daughters (Season 7)	Nominated	
2009	Logie Awards	Most Popular Actress	McLeods Daughters (Season 8)	Nominated	
2009	Logie Awards	Most Popular Personality on Australian Television	McLeods Daughters (Season 8)	Nominated	
