= Inge Hornstra =

Australian actress

- Born: 21 May 1974 (age 50); Netherlands
- Education: National Institute of Dramatic Art
- Occupation: Actress
- Years active: 1991–2014
- Children: 1 daughter, 1 son

Inge Hornstra (born 21 May 1974) is an Holland-born Australian stage and television actress. She is best known for her roles on Heartbreak High and McLeod's Daughters.

== Early life ==
Hornstra was born in 1974 in Netherlands and moved to Australia when she was four years old. She graduated from NIDA with a degree in Performing Arts in 1994.

== Career ==
Hornstra began her acting career in 1993, appearing in a short film titled The Door. She gained recognition for her leading role as 'Tatyana 'Tats' Alecsandri' in Sweat, a drama series set in an athletic school. It also starred Heath Ledger in his first leading role in a television series. The show was cancelled after just one season due to low ratings. Following Sweat, Hornstra had a recurring role as 'Allie Matts' on teen television series Heartbreak High for two seasons. From 2002 to 2006, Hornstra had a recurring role on popular series McLeod's Daughters, as 'Sandra Kinsella' (later Kinsella-Ryan).

Other credits include medical drama series G.P., Big Sky, Murder Call, Wildside, Water Rats, Head Start, BeastMaster, and Farscape; and the television films Chameleon, which aired on UPN in 1998, BlackJack: Murder Archive and BlackJack: Ace Point Game.

== Personal life ==
Hornstra has two children, a daughter, Summer (born 12 July 2004) and a son, Javi (born 2008).

== Filmography ==
Year	Title	Role	Notes
1993	The Door	Daughter	Short film
1995	G.P.	Kim Garland	Episode: "You Say Potato"
1996	Sweat	Tatyana 'Tats' Alecsandri	Leading role; 26 episodes
1995–1997	Heartbreak High	Allie Matts	Recurring role; 33 episodes
1997	Big Sky	Debbie	Episode: "It Only Takes One"
1997	Murder Call	Bliss Bridie	Episode: "Something Wicked"
1998	Never Tell Me Never	Nurse Silla	Television film
1998	Wildside	Ellen Douglas	Episodes: Season 1, episodes 18, 23 & 32
1998	Chameleon	Agent Hudson	Television film
1998	Water Rats	Carly Herbert	Season 3 – Episode 7: "Behind Closed Doors" & Episode 8: "The Long Haul"
2000	Water Rats	Margie Goodwin	Season 5, Episode 12: "Jump in the Mouth"
2001	Head Start	Rhonda	Episode: "Seeing is Believing"
2001	BeastMaster	Nadeea	Episode: "Serpent's Kiss"
2002	Farscape	Essk	Episode: "I-Yensch, You-Yensch"
2003	BlackJack: Murder Archive	Carmen	Television film
2005	BlackJack: Ace Point Game	Kylie Margate	Television film
2002–2006	McLeod's Daughters	Sandra Kinsella / Sandra Kinsella-Ryan	Recurring role; Seasons 2–6 (49 episodes)

== Theatre ==
Year	Title	Role	Notes
1992	Summer of the Aliens	Bev / Beatrice	NIDA Parade Theatre, Sydney
1992	Hanjo		NIDA Parade Theatre, Sydney
1993	The Grace of Mary Traverse	Mary Traverse II / Boy / Mary's Hag	NIDA Parade Theatre, Sydney
1993	All's Well That Ends Well		NIDA Parade Theatre, Sydney
1993	A House Is Built	Ester / A Miss Gillan	NIDA Parade Theatre, Sydney
1994	The Art of Success		NIDA Parade Theatre, Sydney
1994	The Adding Machine		NIDA Parade Theatre, Sydney
1994	Appetite		Fairfax Studio, Melbourne for Melbourne Fringe Festival
1997	Taking Sides		Marian Street Theatre, Sydney with Northside Theatre Company
