= List of Australian films of 2000 =

== 2000 ==
Title	Director	Cast (Subject of documentary)	Genre	Notes	Release date
Angst	Daniel Nettheim	Sam Lewis; Jessica Napier; Justin Smith; Abi Tucker; Luke Lennox	Comedy	Beyond Films	31 August
Better Than Sex	Jonathan Teplitzky	David Wenham; Susie Porter; Catherine McClements; Kris McQuade	Drama	Fireworks Entertainment	9 November
Bootmen	Dein Perry	Adam Garcia; Sophie Lee; Sam Worthington; Matt Lee; Justine Clarke	Drama	20th Century Fox	5 October
Chopper	Andrew Dominik	Eric Bana; Vince Colosimo; Simon Lyndon; Kate Beahan	Biography; Crime	Beyond Films; Based on the life of Mark "Chopper" Read	3 August
City Loop	Belinda Chayko	Jessica Napier; Sullivan Stapleton; Ryan Johnson; Brendan Cowell	Comedy	Beyond Films	17 June
Cthulhu	Damian Heffernan	Paul Douglas; Melissa Georgiou; Marcel Miller; James Payne	Horror	Onara Films	23 July
Cut	Kimble Rendall	Molly Ringwald; Kylie Minogue; Jessica Napier; Frank Roberts; Geoff Revell	Comedy; Horror	Mushroom Pictures	2 March
The Dish	Rob Sitch	Sam Neill; Patrick Warburton; Tom Long; Kevin Harrington; Roy Billing	Drama	Roadshow Entertainment	19 October
Innocence	Paul Cox	Julia Blake; Bud Tingwell; Chris Haywood; Marta Dusseldorp	Drama	Madman Entertainment	21 December
Looking for Alibrandi	Kate Woods	Pia Miranda; Kick Gurry; Anthony LaPaglia; Elena Cotta	Drama	Beyond Films; Based on the novel of the same name by Melina Marchetta	4 May
The Magic Pudding	Karl Zwicky	John Cleese; Hugo Weaving; Geoffrey Rush; Sam Neill; Toni Collette	Animation; Musical	20th Century Fox; Based on the novel of the same name by Norman Lindsay	14 December
Mr. Accident	Yahoo Serious	Yahoo Serious; Helen Dallimore; David Field; Grant Piro	Comedy	Carlotta Films	7 September
Muggers	Dean Murphy	Matt Day; Jason Barry; Nicola Charles; Chris Haywood	Comedy	RocVale Film	25 May
My Mother Frank	Mark Lamprell	Sam Neill; Sinéad Cusack; Celia Ireland; Rose Byrne	Comedy	Beyond Films	17 August
Sample People	Clinton Smith	Kylie Minogue; Simon Lyndon; Ben Mendelsohn; Joel Edgerton; David Field	Comedy; Drama	Magna Pacific	11 May
Selkie	Donald Crombie	Shimon Moore; Chelsea Bruland; Mariana Rego; Elspeth Ballantyne	Fantasy	United International Pictures	6 April
Sensitive New-Age Killer	Mark Savage	Tyson Stein; Nicole Lambert; Julie Turner; Peter Beitans	Action	20th Century Fox	21 July
Tackle Happy	Mick Molloy	About the live play Puppetry of the Penis	Documentary	Madman Entertainment	6 April
The Wog Boy	Aleksi Vellis	Nick Giannopoulos; Vince Colosimo; Abi Tucker; Lucy Bell	Comedy	20th Century Fox	24 February

== See also ==
- 2000 in Australia
- 2000 in Australian television
- List of 2000 box office number-one films in Australia
