= Avenue of Eternal Peace (novel) =

1989 novel by Nicholas Jose

- Author: Nicholas Jose
- Language: English
- Genre: Literary novel
- Publisher: Penguin Books
- Publication date: 1989
- Publication place: Australia
- Media type: Print (Paperback)
- Pages: 299
- Awards: 1990 Miles Franklin Award, shortlisted
- ISBN: 0140117245

Avenue of Eternal Peace (1989) is a novel written by Australian author Nicholas Jose. It was originally published by Penguin Books.

The novel was shortlisted for the 1990 Miles Franklin Award.

== Plot summary ==
Wally Firth, an Australian doctor with a specialisation in cancer research, is a visiting professor at Peking University Medical College. Firth is recently widowed and burnt-out and hopes this new posting will help revive him. He is also hoping to meet Professor Hsu Chien Lung, who some years earlier wrote a ground-breaking paper on cancer. But his searches are in vain as Professor Hsu seems to have vanished. Perhaps he never existed at all.

The novel is set in the months leading up to the massacre at Tiananmen Square in May and June 1989.

== Critical reception ==
Reviewing the novel for Australian Book Review Paul Salzman noted that Jose had written the book in 1987, so the "fact that the map of history it stems from has changed so dramatically adds an extra fillip to the reader's vicarious experience of the 'new' China". Salzman concluded that like "all experiences of what is foreign, Avenue of Eternal Peace offers glimpses of a difference in perspective that can only be fleeting."

Alison Broinowski in The Sydney Morning Herald found that the author's strength "is that he walks outside the walls of the foreign compounds, in the dust of the streets, in the bars, parks and back alleys, and in the provinces." She continued: "Nick Jose's achievement is to explain in human terms what makes the China bomb tick."

== Publication history ==
After the book's initial publication in Australia in 1989 by Penguin Books it was reprinted as follows:

- 1991, E. P. Dutton and Company, USA
- 2008, Wakefield Press, Australia

The book was also translated into Chinese in 1991.

== Film adaptation ==
- Avenue of Eternal Peace was filmed for television as Children of the Dragon (1992) by Southern Star Xanadu and Zenith for ABC TV and the BBC, starring Bob Peck, Linda Cropper, Gary Sweet and Joan Chen. The adaptation was directed by Peter Smith, from a screenplay by Robert Caswell.

== Notes ==
- Epigraph:

Not that there are no ghosts But that their influence becomes propitious In the sound existence of a living man There is no difference between the quick and the dead, They are one channel of vitality. -Lao Tzu

...a country so strange that not even the air had anything in common with his native air, where one might die of strangeness, and yet whose enchantment was such that one could only go on and lose oneself forever. - Franz Kafka

Perhaps I should tell the children A tale. -Yang Lian

- Nicholas Jose wrote about his time in China for The Age newspaper just prior to the novel's publication.
