= Wildside (Australian TV series) =

- Genre: Crime drama Action; Neo-noir; Crime thriller Police procedural Tragedy
- Created by: Michael Jenkins; Ben Gannon
- Starring: Tony Martin; Rachael Blake; Aaron Pedersen; Jessica Napier; Alex Dimitriades; Abi Tucker
- Theme music composer: Peter Best
- Country of origin: Australia
- No. of series: 3 (1 miniseries + 2 full series)
- No. of episodes: 60 (4 episode miniseries + 56 regular episodes)

Production
- Executive producers: Ben Gannon; Michael Jenkins; Andy Lloyd James
- Producer: Steve Knapman
- Running time: 90 minutes (miniseries episodes); 45–50 minutes (regular episodes)
- Production company: Gannon Jenkins Television Pty Ltd

Original release
- Network: ABC TV
- Release: 23 November 1997 – 2 July 1999

Wildside is an Australian crime drama television series broadcast by the Australian Broadcasting Corporation from 1997 to 1999. It was created by director Michael Jenkins and producer Ben Gannon.

Wildside began as a 180-minute miniseries which aired over two nights on November 23, 1997 and November 24, 1997. It returned on February 4, 1998 in a one-hour format.

The show stars Tony Martin as Bill McCoy, a former detective who comes to Sydney looking for his missing son. Unlike other police procedurals, it also follows the staff of a crisis centre, run by Dr. Maxine Summers (Rachael Blake), in the gritty, red-light district of the city.

The series was filmed in Darlinghurst, Sydney and was characterised by its use of ad lib dialogue and hand held camera work. The show was critically acclaimed, winning several Logie Awards, including Most Outstanding Miniseries Logie in 1998, and Silver Logies for outstanding work by Tony Martin and Rachael Blake in 1999, as well as several Australian Film Institute Awards.

== Cast ==
=== Starring ===
The following appear in the opening credits as series regulars:

- Tony Martin as Detective Sergeant Bill McCoy, a former detective searching for his missing son who is soon persuaded to rejoin the police
- Rachael Blake as Dr. Maxine Summers, a doctor who runs a community crisis centre
- Aaron Pedersen as Vince Cellini, an Italian-Australian lawyer at the crisis centre who later discovers his Aboriginal heritage (miniseries, 1.01–2.10)
- Jessica Napier as Gerry Davis, the receptionist at the crisis centre and a former street kid and sex worker herself (miniseries, 1.01–1.36)
- Alex Dimitriades as Detective Charlie Coustos, McCoy's partner (2.01–2.20, also starring in 1.09–1.36)
- Abi Tucker as Detective Constable Kate Holbeck, colleague of McCoy and Coustos, who later becomes Coustos' wife (2.11–2.20, also starring in 2.01–2.10)

=== Also starring ===
The following cast members are credited at the end of every episode in which they appear, before the preview of next week's episode and separated from the other guest actors.

- John Howard as Detective Frank Reilly, McCoy's corrupt former partner (miniseries, 1.01)
- Victoria Longley as Detective Inspector Virginia King
- Tammy MacIntosh as Detective Kim Devlin, Reilly's partner, becomes McCoy's partner (miniseries, 1.01–1.08)
- Richard Carter as Detective Brian Deakin, colleague of McCoy and Coustos
- Mary Coustas as Louise Arden, Vince Cellini's replacement as the crisis centre's resident lawyer, who is later revealed to have a criminal past (2.11–2.20)

=== Recurring characters ===
- John O'Hare as Rob Summers, Maxine's husband, they later divorce (miniseries, 1.01–1.08)
- Abbie Cornish as Simone Summers, Maxine's daughter
- Jim Holt as Senior Sergeant Graham Holbeck, Kate's father (1.26–2.16)
- Mitchell McMahon as Nick McCoy, Bill's son (miniseries, 1.39–2.04)

Former police detective John Haas acts as the show's police adviser and appears in the background of nearly every episode as Detective Mark Doyle, a colleague of McCoy and Deakin.

Martin and Blake were the only actors to appear in every episode. They began an off screen relationship during the show's run and married in 2003.

== Production and broadcast ==
Wildside was created by Michael Jenkins and Ben Gannon and originally produced as a miniseries. It was first broadcast on November 23, 1997 and November 24, 1997. A further 36 episodes were broadcast between February and September 1998. After the first series, Jessica Napier was written off the show, with the writers admitting they found it difficult to find storylines for her character.

A second series of 20 episodes was broadcast between February and July 1999. The show was cancelled in December 1998 due to high production costs and the difficulty in selling the show overseas.

In repeats and syndication, the miniseries was edited into the first four episodes of the 40-episode first series.

The style of production was very similar to Jenkins' earlier series Scales of Justice and Blue Murder, particularly the "observational" use of multiple hand-held cameras and the density of semi-improvised dialogue. Many of the cast had previously worked with Jenkins and Gannon in Blue Murder and Heartbreak High, including regulars Tony Martin, Alex Dimitriades and Abi Tucker, and guest stars Hugh Baldwin, Scott Major, Mario Gamma, Jon Pollard, Sebastian Goldspink, Doris Younane, Emma Roche, Salvatore Coco, Tara Jakszewicz, Inge Hornstra, Diane Craig, Vince Poletto, Tai Nguyen and Nina Liu. Nico Lathouris acts as the show's dramaturg and acting coach, continuing his long collaboration with Jenkins and Gannon.

=== Controversy ===
Several episodes of the show were based on real life crimes and events, which led to some controversy. The thirteenth episode of the first series, which aired on April 22, 1998 and involved the stabbing of a cab driver, did not initially air in New South Wales, due to a court case that was proceeding at the time. Another episode, which aired on May 6, 1998, was based on a real life incident in which a Muslim boy was run down by a car. It aired with a disclaimer: "The story of the injured boy depicted in the following episode of Wildside is inspired by real events. However, the action of some characters has been significantly altered for dramatic purposes."

An episode which featured a far right female politician resembling Pauline Hanson was pulled by ABC in June 1998, claiming it was "inappropriate" to air on the eve of the Queensland election. Aaron Pederson quit the show in protest, before being convinced to return by the show's producers. The episode aired the following week.

== Episodes ==
Season	Episodes	Originally released	
Season	Episodes	First released	Last released
Miniseries	4	November 23, 1997	November 24, 1997
1	36	February 4, 1998	September 30, 1998
2	20	February 26, 1999	July 2, 1999

=== Miniseries (1997) ===
No.	Title	Original release date
1	"Episode 1"	November 23, 1997
Ex-cop Bill McCoy, arrives at a Sydney crisis centre from Kuala Lumpur, looking for his son Nick who has vanished. He begins uncovering a ring of pedophiles connected with the rape and murder of a young boy. NOTE: Episodes 1 & 2 initially aired together as a single 90-minute episode. Later airings split them into separate episodes. notable guest stars: Rose Byrne, Paul Pantano, Aaron Blabey
2	"Episode 2"	November 23, 1997
With the aid of Maxine, the doctor at the crisis centre, Bill McCoy continues to search for his missing son, only to find a second mutilated body. He eventually uncovers a tape with his son, and Candy, a prostitute. notable guest stars: Rose Byrne, Paul Pantano, Aaron Blabey, Sam Healy, Andy Anderson, Gillian Jones
3	"Episode 3"	November 24, 1997
Bill tracks Candy to a strip bar where she works as an exotic dancer, and delves deeper into the identities of the pedophiles preying on the street kids. NOTE: Episodes 3 & 4 initially aired together as a single 90-minute episode. Later airings split them into separate episodes. notable guest stars: Paul Pantano, Aaron Blabey, Sam Healy, Simon Westaway
4	"Episode 4"	November 24, 1997
Bill suspects the police are going after the wrong people to protect the more powerful members of the ring, and finally confronts the man he suspects of murdering his son. notable guest stars: Paul Pantano, Aaron Blabey, Simon Westaway, Hugh Baldwin

=== Series 1 (1998) ===
No. overall	No. in series	Title	Original release date
5	1	"Episode 5"	February 4, 1998
Bill wrestles with his doubts over Reilly, who has been accused of corruption. notable guest stars: Peter Kowitz, Norman Kaye, Anne Looby, Scott Major
6	2	"Episode 6"	February 11, 1998
Maxine searches for Debbie, a prostitute working Canterbury Road. She's HIV positive and is possibly passing the infection on. NOTE: Part 1 of 2 part episode. notable guest stars: Susie Porter, Tiriel Mora, Alan Cinis
7	3	"Episode 7"	February 18, 1998
Bill investigates Debbie's gang rape and discovers that one of the culprits may be the son of a politician who has been trying to rid the district of sex workers. NOTE: Part 2 of 2 part episode. notable guest stars: Susie Porter, Tiriel Mora, Anthony Hayes, Mario Gamma
8	4	"Episode 8"	February 25, 1998
When a single mother is brutally killed outside her home, McCoy has 48 hours to find her killer before having to turn the case over to Homicide. notable guest stars: Leah Vandenberg, Jon Pollard
9	5	"Episode 9"	March 4, 1998
With his father after him to find a more lucrative job, Vince takes on the case of an illegal Iraqi refugee caught up in Bill's investigation of a stolen car racket. notable guest stars: Doris Younane, Silvio Ofria, Sebastian Goldspink
10	6	"Episode 10"	March 11, 1998
Maxine takes on the delicate case of an alleged sexual abuse in a family she knows personally. notable guest stars: Dina Panozzo, Silvio Ofria, Emma Roche
11	7	"Episode 11"	March 18, 1998
Maxine is called out to a rave party when a teenage school girl overdoses, while Bill and Kim investigate the rival gangs believed to be the source of the drugs. NOTE: Part 1 of 2 part episode. notable guest stars: Steve Bastoni, Simon Lyndon, Justine Clarke, Andrew S. Gilbert, Lenka Kripac
12	8	"Episode 12"	March 18, 1998
When a bikie gang war erupts in massacre, Bill McCoy is under pressure to make arrests and lay charges. Kim feels betrayed at being shut out as she finds herself the subject of an Internal Affairs investigation. NOTE: Part 2 of 2 part episode. notable guest stars: Steve Bastoni, Simon Lyndon, Justine Clarke, Andrew S. Gilbert
13	9	"Episode 13"	March 25, 1998
Maxine finds herself in the middle of a violent dispute between the young mother's boyfriend and father. With the assistance of Charlie Coustos, Bill investigates the murder of a prominent asian gang member following a night in a backroom casino in Chinatown. notable guest stars: Shane Withington, Salvatore Coco, Tara Jakszewicz
14	10	"Episode 14"	April 1, 1998
When a high-profile gay doctor is murdered in his home, Bill is reunited with his estranged lesbian sister, Kate. notable guest stars: Dee Smart
15	11	"Episode 15"	April 8, 1998
Bill and Charlie become involved in the investigation of a petrol station robbery where one of the victims turns out to be the son of a man Bill put away years before. notable guest stars: Michael Caton, Joel Edgerton, Leeanna Walsman
16	12	"Episode 16"	April 15, 1998
Brought in to represent her on drug and theft charges, Vince tries to convince a heroin-addicted prostitute to turn her life around. notable guest stars: Anna Lise Phillips
17	13	"Episode 17"	April 22, 1998
Bill and Charlie investigate the horrific murder of a taxi driver.
18	14	"Episode 18"	April 29, 1998
Bill and Charlie are called to the train station where they find seventeen-year-old Luke, naked and bound to a train carriage, who claims it was a buck's night prank. notable guest stars: Inge Hornstra, Terry Serio, Michael Denkha, Josh Quong Tart
19	15	"Episode 19"	May 6, 1998
Maxine has taken her sister, Nina, under her wing to help sort out her domestic crisis. Bill and Charlie wrestle with racial violence on a housing estate. NOTE: Part 1 of 2 part episode. notable guest stars: Lucy Bell, Simon Bossell, Marc Gray
20	16	"Episode 20"	May 13, 1998
Maxine's drinking problem worsens as she is struggles with her sister's murder. NOTE: Part 2 of 2 part episode. notable guest stars: Lucy Bell, Simon Bossell
21	17	"Episode 21"	May 20, 1998
McCoy's plans to nail a Vietnamese drug importer are complicated when a crusading Chinese mayor is gunned down. NOTE: Part 1 of 2 part episode. notable guest stars: Russell Kiefel, Jason Chong, Miles Paras, Kee Chan
22	18	"Episode 22"	May 27, 1998
McCoy plays a waiting game using millions of dollars' worth of heroin as bait, while also continuing to look into the murders of Mayor Henry Li and Tran, a kid caught up in the gangster world of Asian drug importations. NOTE: Part 2 of 2 part episode. notable guest stars: Russell Kiefel, Jason Chong, Miles Paras
23	19	"Episode 23"	June 3, 1998
Bill and Deakin are searching for three escaped female prisoners, including Debbie, a prostitute and former client of the crisis centre. notable guest stars: Susie Porter, Inge Hornstra, Deborah Kennedy
24	20	"Episode 24"	June 10, 1998
Bill investigates a threat made against Carol Wilson, a State MP who has outrageous views on Aboriginals. notable guest stars: Linda Cropper, Lewis Fitz-Gerald, Wayne Pygram, Bob Maza
25	21	"Episode 25"	June 17, 1998
McCoy and Deakin investigate the shooting deaths of four Tongons, while Charlie Coustas tracks a gun-importation racket. NOTE: Part 1 of 2 part episode. notable guest stars: Paul Pantano, John Brumpton, Josef Ber, Tony Barry
26	22	"Episode 26"	June 24, 1998
Bill tries to save Joe from addiction by getting his father to turn his back on his criminal associates. NOTE: Part 2 of 2 part episode. notable guest stars: Paul Pantano, John Brumpton, Josef Ber, Steven Vidler
27	23	"Episode 27"	July 1, 1998
Charlie finds himself faced with a conflict of interest when a childhood friend is charged with aggravated assault. notable guest stars: Grant Bowler, Max Phipps
28	24	"Episode 28"	July 8, 1998
Virginia investigates corruption in the police force when her lover's house is shot at in a driveby. notable guest stars: David Roberts
29	25	"Episode 29"	July 15, 1998
Charlie's gambling addiction leads him into the clutches of loan sharks and into temptation. Maxine is convinced to lie for a pregnant thirteen-year-old Muslim girl. notable guest stars: Paul Sonkkila, Bojana Novakovic
30	26	"Episode 30"	July 22, 1998
Bill and Charlie investigate the murder of the publisher of a fashion magazine but Charlie is distracted by an attractive witness. notable guest stars: Felix Williamson, Jacek Koman
31	27	"Episode 31"	July 29, 1998
Bill and Deakin find themselves in the middle of a tow-truck war after a stabbing at a road accident. notable guest stars: Jeremy Sims, Sandy Winton
32	28	"Episode 32"	August 5, 1998
Bill and Charlie become involved in searching for a missing hearing impaired child, who disappeared while selling charity chocolates in her local inner city area. notable guest stars: David Field, Zoe Carides, Justine Clarke
33	29	"Episode 33"	August 12, 1998
Bill and Charlie are called to a domestic where they witness a father, Sean O'Connor, hit his son. Bill gets emotionally involved to the point where he has a complaint laid against him for assault. notable guest stars: Roxane Wilson, Brett Swain, Dan Spielman
34	30	"Episode 34"	August 19, 1998
Vince discovers his own political consciousness when an aborigine is mistaken for a wanted man and shot during a police raid. notable guest stars: Christine Anu, Aaron Jeffery, Peter Hardy
35	31	"Episode 35"	August 26, 1998
Charlie goes undercover in attempt to crack a drugs and extortion racket. NOTE: Part 1 of 2 part episode. notable guest stars: John Clayton, Anita Hegh, George Vidalis, Shane Connor
36	32	"Episode 36"	September 2, 1998
Charlie finds himself under pressure on three fronts — his promotion, his relationship with Maxine and his deepening involvement with the criminals he is investigating. NOTE: Part 2 of 2 part episode. notable guest stars: John Clayton, Anita Hegh, George Vidalis, Shane Connor
37	33	"Episode 37"	September 9, 1998
Bill is quick to set his sights on a suspect for a series of mutilation murders, but he is determined to prove the man's girlfriend was involved in the crimes. notable guest stars: Robert Mammone
38	34	"Episode 38"	September 16, 1998
After a murder at a male brothel, a colleague of McCoy's comes under suspicion. notable guest stars: Robert Mammone
39	35	"Episode 39"	September 23, 1998
McCoy and Charlie pursue an ex-cop they suspect of being a major cocaine importer. While dealing with the news of his ex-wife's death, McCoy is unaware his son has resurfaced at the crisis centre. NOTE: Part 1 of 2 part episode. notable guest stars: Robert Mammone, Diane Craig, Roy Billing
40	36	"Episode 40"	September 30, 1998
While he is being investigated by internal affairs for his suspected involvement in the shooting of Jimmy Jago, Bill meets with Nick and discovers the truth about his reasons for returning. NOTE: Part 2 of 2 part episode. Final appearance of Jessica Napier. notable guest stars: Diane Craig, Roy Billing

=== Series 2 (1999) ===
No. overall	No. in series	Title	Original release date
41	1	"Episode 41"	February 26, 1999
Bill deals with a woman who was robbed at an ATM and claims the offender escaped by stealing her car and abducting her three-month-old baby. NOTE: Alex Dimitriades is added to the opening credits, replacing Jessica Napier. notable guest stars: Les Hill
42	2	"Episode 42"	March 5, 1999
A mentally disturbed man is arrested after a vicious hammer attack at a train station leaves another man dead. notable guest stars: Grant Piro, Jodie Dry
43	3	"Episode 43"	March 12, 1999
Bill and Charlie investigate a bank robbery. Bill recognises the culprit as Derek Lamb, an escaped convict with a chequered past who Bill put in prison six years ago. NOTE: Part 1 of 2 part episode. notable guest stars: Jim Moriarty
44	4	"Episode 44"	March 19, 1999
Derek has Maxine in his clutches and Bill puts the clues together almost too late. Although he saves Maxine, Bill is unaware that his son is becoming the next target. NOTE: Part 2 of 2 part episode. notable guest stars: Jim Moriarty, Wynn Roberts
45	5	"Episode 45"	March 26, 1999
Cultural tension between gangs in an inner city high school reaches a boiling point when Bing Ling, a member of the Asian gang, is killed. While trying to uncover who was responsible, Simone's teacher Aiden becomes a suspect. notable guest stars: Tai Nguyen, Vince Poletto
46	6	"Episode 46"	April 2, 1999
Kate and Charlie find themselves in conflict in the lead up to the Coronial Inquest into her shooting of Gordy Gilmour.
47	7	"Episode 47"	April 9, 1999
Bill and Charlie investigate the stabbing of a young girl. notable guest stars: Billie Rose Prichard
48	8	"Episode 48"	April 9, 1999
After a young sex worker is found strangled, Vince finds himself on the wrong side of the law. notable guest stars: Robert Taylor, Christine Stephen-Daly
49	9	"Episode 49"	April 16, 1999
McCoy, Kate, and Charlie investigate the murder of the wife of a wealthy importer and identify the husband as a prime suspect. notable guest stars: Liz Burch
50	10	"Episode 50"	April 23, 1999
Confusion reigns as Vince receives his blood test results, forcing him to confront his father about his Aboriginal background. NOTE: Final appearance of Aaron Pedersen. notable guest stars: Steve Jacobs
51	11	"Episode 51"	April 30, 1999
Maxine is at odds with Vince's replacement, Louise Arden, an ambitious lawyer who appears to be from a privileged background. NOTE: Abi Tucker is added to the opening credits, replacing Aaron Pedersen. notable guest stars: Tara Morice, Erik Thomson, Kieran Darcy-Smith
52	12	"Episode 52"	May 7, 1999
On the way to work, Kate puts herself in danger by to responding solo to a report of an armed robbery which has ended with one of the offenders being shot by the shop owner.
53	13	"Episode 53"	May 14, 1999
When the body of a girl is found buried in a park, an obsessive former client of Maxine's becomes the prime suspect. notable guest stars: Jeremy Callaghan, Alan Cinis, Antonia Murphy
54	14	"Episode 54"	May 21, 1999
Wilt Bolton's car yard has been broken into overnight and Wilt's BMW is missing — along with the security guard who was supposed to be looking after it. notable guest stars: Kick Gurry
55	15	"Episode 55"	May 28, 1999
Charlie hunts a sexual psychopath who preys on young men. notable guest stars: Julian Garner
56	16	"Episode 56"	June 4, 1999
Kate and Charlie come to odds when her father becomes a suspect in the death of a prostitute. notable guest stars: Simone Kessell, Loene Carmen
57	17	"Episode 57"	June 11, 1999
Bill and Charlie investigate the murder of a homeless man. notable guest stars: Chris Haywood, Harold Hopkins, Bob Baines, Myles Pollard
58	18	"Episode 58"	June 18, 1999
A million dollars' worth of cocaine goes missing in a drugs bust and Bill is under pressure to get it back. notable guest stars: Shane Briant, Joy Smithers, Marton Csokas
59	19	"Episode 59"	June 25, 1999
Maxine is distraught when Simone is kidnapped by a psychopath. notable guest stars: Denise Roberts, Samuel Johnson
60	20	"Episode 60"	July 2, 1999
Bill and Charlie investigate the murder of a leading heart surgeon with links to a pharmaceutical company. notable guest stars: Gary Sweet, Kris McQuade, Sonia Todd, Nina Liu

== DVD release ==
The series was released by the ABC on DVD in three volumes, each containing 20 episodes across 5 discs.

== Awards and nominations ==
Year	Awards	Category	Nominee	Result
1998	Logie Awards	Most Outstanding Actor in a Series	Tony Martin	Won
1998	Logie Awards	Most Outstanding Mini-series or Movie Made for Television	Wildside	Won
1998	Logie Awards	Most Outstanding Actress in a Series	Rachael Blake	Nominated
1998	AFI Awards	Best Screenplay in a Television Drama	Tim Pye (for episode 17)	Won
1998	AFI Awards	Best Achievement in Direction in a Television Drama	Peter Andrikidis (for episode 17)	Won
1998	AFI Awards	Best Mini-Series or Telefeature	Steve Knapman	Won
1998	AFI Awards	Best Performance by an Actress in a Leading Role in a Television Drama	Rachael Blake	Won
1998	AFI Awards	Best Episode in a Television Drama Series	Steve Knapman (for episode 17)	Won
1998	AFI Awards	Best Performance by an Actor in a Leading Role in a Television Drama	Tony Martin	Nominated
1998	APRA Awards	Best TV Theme	Peter Best	Won
1998	Australian Screen Sound Guild	Best Sound in a Television Drama Series	For episodes 35 and 36	Won
1999	Logie Awards	Most Outstanding Actor in a Series	Tony Martin; Tied with David Wenham	Won
1999	Logie Awards	Most Outstanding Actress in a Series	Rachael Blake	Nominated
1999	Logie Awards	Most Outstanding Drama Series	Wildside	Nominated
1999	AFI Awards	Best Episode in a Television Drama Series	Steve Knapman (for episode 59)	Won
1999	AFI Awards	Young Actor's Award	Abbie Cornish (for episode 59)	Won
1999	AFI Awards	Best Actor in a Leading Role in a Television Drama	Samuel Johnson (for episode 59)	Nominated
1999	AFI Awards	Best Screenplay in a Television Drama	Kris Wyld (for episode 59)	Nominated
1999	AFI Awards	Best Direction in a Television Drama	Peter Andrikidis (for episode 59)	Nominated
1999	Australian Screen Sound Guild	Best Achievement in Sound in a TV Drama Series	For episode 59	Won

== See also ==
- List of Australian television series
