= Endorphin (band) =

- Birth name: Eric Chapus
- Born: 1962 (age 62–63); Saint-Tropez, France
- Origin: Kuranda, Queensland, Australia
- Genres: Electronic, trip hop
- Occupation(s): Musician, producer, teacher
- Instrument(s): Keyboards, guitar
- Years active: 1984–present
- Labels: Sony/Epic
- Website: endorphinmusic.com

Endorphin is the stage name of Eric Chapus (born ca. 1962, Saint-Tropez, France), an electronic act and music teacher. Since 1984 he has lived in Australia originally at Kuranda, where he started his musical career. He has released six studio albums, Embrace (1998), Skin (1999), AM:PM (2001), Seduction (2003), Shake It... (2004) and Soon After Silence (2007). At the ARIA Music Awards of 1998 Embrace was nominated for Best Dance Release. Skin reached No. 32 on the ARIA Albums Chart and at the related ARIA awards ceremony he was nominated for Best Male Artist. Endorphin teaches courses in Composition and Music Production at the Australian Institute of Music.

== Biography ==
Eric Chapus who performs as Endorphin was born in ca. 1962 and raised in Saint-Tropez, France. His parents separated when he was ten and at 13 he went to live with his father in Goa, India. He later recalled "I thought he was the coolest thing... he introduced me to lots of drugs at 13. We were living in the streets, living like beggars. It was really an eye-opener. We buried our passports and lived for one year like total vagrants. We took a lot of drugs, smoked a lot of hash and I had a bad experience with LSD."

In 1984 Chapus moved to Australia and settled in Kuranda where he started his music career. From mid-1980s to early 1990s he was in a variety of avant-garde groups including Godzila in the Mist, an industrial music band, which used "the noise of chainsaws and angle grinders." From 1996 he performed as a solo artist, Endorphin, and recorded two tracks, "Pacific" and "Relapse". The latter track was entered in the Unearthed talent competition run by national radio station, Triple J.

=== 1998-2002: Columbia years ===
He signed with Columbia and worked on his debut album, Embrace which was released early in 1998. David Peter Wesolowski of AllMusic described it as "chilled out" and noticed that it "grabbed plenty of critical praise but was also a commercial success in Australia." At the ARIA Music Awards of 1998 it was nominated for Best Dance Release.

The artist supported the Australian legs of tours by Portishead (April 1998), Massive Attack (June), Faithless and then Moby. The album's third single, "Satie", is a tribute to French composer Erik Satie, and was compiled on a various artists album, Café Del Mar, Volumen Seis (1999).

Endorphin relocated to Sydney to record his second studio album, Skin, which was released in 1999. Wesolowski opined that it was "more direct, a shade less intricate, and thus easier to get into. In the long run, however, it's probably not quite as rewarding. It certainly offers a decent range of sounds, including sultry female vocals, exotic samples, hypnotic trip-hop arrangements, and brooding basslines." Guest vocals were supplied by Tammy Brennan (of Pavo Christatus) on two tracks, and one track each by Cindy Ryan (Stella One Eleven), Sabina Carney (his girlfriend) and Zoe Chapus (their daughter).

Jasper Lee of Oz Music Project felt that "perhaps a more darker and intense core is needed to give Endorphin that extra edge" as the album showed "ground covered too many times and a style that is a tad bit boring and unoriginal." Skin peaked at No. 32 on the ARIA Albums Chart in November of that year. At the ARIA Music Awards of 2000 Endorphin was nominated for Best Male Artist for that album.

Endorphin's third studio album, AM:PM was released in October 2001, which reached No. 43. It also reached No. 11 the ARIA Australasian Artists Albums chart. An ARIA staff writer reported, "[it's] a double album with the AM part reflecting the studio sound, whilst the PM side reflecting the live aspect of this brilliant artist." Guest vocalists include Luke Hannigan (of Lo-Tel), Jimmy Little, Abi Tucker (The Secret Life of Us) and Caroline Wilson (Kinetic); Endorphin co-produced it with Daniel Denholm.

=== 2003-2009: Independent artist ===
Seduction, his fourth studio album, was released on 5 May 2003. It was album of the week from 9 June for ABC radio station, Gold and Tweed Coasts, because he "fuses his signature electronica sounds with new musical collaborations with live musicians and singers". For the album he used Iva Davies, Jade Macrae, the Martinez Brothers and Sarah McGregor. Indy Lin of InTheMix opined that it shows "brilliant use of live instruments and vocals harmoniously woven into Endorphin's signature beats." His fifth album, Shake It... (27 September 2004) provided a charting single, "Love Is a Dancefloor" (February 2005), which reached the ARIA Singles Chart top 100.

He followed, in May 2007, with his sixth studio album, Soon After Silence, and then his first compilation album, 2069 in March 2009. As a teacher Endorphin instructs courses in Composition and Music Production at the Australian Institute of Music, Sydney campus.

== Discography ==
=== Studio albums ===
List of live albums, with selected chart positions and certifications
Title	Album details	Peak chart positions
Title	Album details	AUS
Embrace	Released: June 1998; Label: Columbia (489821.2); Formats: CD, 2×LP	76
Skin	Released: November 1999; Label: Columbia (495235.2); Formats: CD	32
AM:PM	Released: October 2001; Label: Columbia (5034822000); Formats: 2×CD+CD_Rom	43
Seduction	Released: May 2003; Label: Seduction Records (SRE01); Formats: CD	-
Shake It...	Released: 2004; Label: Seduction Records (SRE02); Formats: CD	-
Soon After Silence	Released: 2007; Label: Seduction Records (SRE07); Formats: CD, digital	-

=== Compilation albums ===
List of compilation albums, with selected chart positions and certifications
Title	Album details	Peak chart positions
Title	Album details	AUS
2069 (Re-Recordings & Rarities)	Released: 2009; Label: Endorphin Music; Formats: Digital	-

=== Charting singles ===
List of singles, with selected chart positions
Title	Year	Peak chart positions	Album
Title	Year	AUS	Album
"Love Is a Dancefloor"	2005	82	Shake It

== Awards ==
=== ARIA Music Awards ===
The ARIA Music Awards is an annual awards ceremony that recognises excellence, innovation, and achievement across all genres of Australian music. They commenced in 1987. Endorphin were nominated for two awards.

Year	Nominee / work	Award	Result
1998	Embrace	Best Dance Release	Nominated
2000	Skin	Best Male Artist	Nominated
