= Petals (TV series) =

Australian children's television show, launched 1998

- Petals opening titles
- Genre: Children's television series
- Created by: Mark Barnard
- Written by: Simon Hopkinson; Angela Webber; Jenny Lewis; Moya Sayer-Jones; Richard Tulloch; Mark Barnard; Bruce Liebau
- Directed by: Maurice Giacomini; Mark Barnard; Bronwyn Morgan
- Voices of: Brian Meegan; Celia Ireland; Gabby Millgate; Adam Kronenberg; Michelle Doake; Lucinda Armour; Tim Mieville
- Narrated by: Anthony Warlow
- Composer: Justin McCoy
- Country of origin: Australia
- Original language: English
- No. of seasons: 1
- No. of episodes: 30

Production
- Executive producers: Mark Barnard; Susan Oliver
- Producers: Bronwyn Morgan; Joy Carroll
- Running time: 5 minutes

Original release
- Network: ABC
- Release: 1 June 1998 – 22 November 1999

Petals is an Australian children's animated television series created by Mark Barnard and aired on the ABC. It ran from 1 June 1998 to 22 November 1999 consisting a total of one season and 30 episodes and was aimed at pre-school children aged 2–6. After it ended in 1999, the series was still continued to be repeated on the ABC and ABC1 until 23 January 2004.

== Plot ==
The series revolves around five small petals who live in a large, overgrown garden. Bougie, Boronia, Poppy, Notsy and Imp greet each day in wide-eyed wonder as their explorations among the giant flowers and trees uncover surprises and delights. However, the Petals are just small little people that one cannot see but one can imagine them. They are also not fairies and do not have magical powers. They are athletic and only Bougie and Poppy are able to fly. Here they discover many surprises, delights and adventures such as helping a baby bird, picking berries, helping Imp turn a dripping tap off, playing a game of hide and seek, making bubbles with some soap, Imp rescuing Notsy with fireflies when she got lost, using a broken mirror to frighten Jeffrey and putting on a show to cheer up Worm when he had a kink in his tail. Joining them in their adventures were five other characters who were all insects. They were Cicada, Ant, Spider, Worm, and Ladybird. There is also an orange playful cat named Jeffrey who likes to hang around in the garden and cause trouble for the Petals.

== Episode list ==
=== Series 1 ===
1. A Boot Full of Petals
2. Getting Dirty
3. The Great Race
4. The Baby Bird
5. The Dripping Tap
6. Firefly Rescue
7. Poppy's Picnic
8. Hide and Seek
9. Car on the Hill
10. Notsy's Knot
11. Mr Exciting
12. Sticky Scary Thing
13. The Jeffrey Free Zone
14. Notsy's Trail
15. Berry Hunters
16. A Turn for Worm
17. Loop the Loop
18. The Flying Imp
19. Snow
20. Water Works
21. Broken Mirror
22. Autumn
23. Windy Weather
24. Cry Wolf
25. Sea-Slide
26. Rainy Day Journey
27. Bubbles
28. Imp's Treasure
29. Broken Wing
30. The Lost Piano

== Cast ==
- Anthony Warlow – Narrator
- Brian Meegan – Bougie
- Celia Ireland – Boronia
- Gabby Millgate – Poppy
- Adam Kronenberg – Imp
- Michelle Doake – Notsy
- Lucinda Armour – Spider / Ant
- Tim Mieville – Jeffrey / Worm / Cicada

== Production ==
- The series was produced by the same producers as Bananas in Pyjamas at Catflap Animation Studios in Sydney. Catflap was launched and run by Maurice Giacomini (who also the director for the series) in 1988. Catflap has also made hundreds of television commercials, several animated short films, the character design for the 1995 animated film The Pied Piper of Hamelin and the animation for the American animated feature film All Dogs Go to Heaven 2 (which was a sequel to the first All Dogs Go to Heaven movie).
- Some of the episodes were written by Simon Hopkinson who has also written many episodes of Bananas in Pyjamas as well as other children's programmes such as New MacDonald's Farm, Dive Olly Dive!, Chuck Finn, Raggs and the animated feature film The Magic Pudding.
- It was one of the first children's fully 2D animated series created and produced for the ABC as well as being commissioned, funded and to have it aimed at pre-school children.
- Like several ABC shows such as Bananas in Pyjamas, The Adventures of Spot, Thomas the Tank Engine & Friends and Ferry Boat Fred it first aired at 3:55 pm in the afternoons and at 9:25 am in the mornings. However it was the final programme to air at 3:55 pm, (the ABC's original afternoon timeslot) until 11 January 1999 where the afternoon schedules were now upgraded by having extra shows such as Play School now airing at 3:30 pm and several half-hour, 5-minute short and 10-minute programmes airing at 4:00 pm, although Petals continued airing at 9:25 am in 2000.
- The characters for the show come from the long tradition of fairies imagined at the bottom of the garden, and both the look and feel of the characters were based on plant species such as boronia, poppies and forget-me-nots.

== International airings ==
- Petals has also been shown in several other countries including the United Kingdom, Slovakia, South Africa and Malaysia.

== Video releases ==
Several episodes were released on video in 1998, however there has been no DVD release. There were three volumes in total and each of them contain ten episodes.

- Firefly Rescue and Other Stories – (100785) Released: 1998

Episodes include Firefly Rescue, A Boot Full of Petals, Mr. Exciting, The Flying Imp, The Dripping Tap, Notsy's Knot, Hide and Seek, The Jeffrey Free Zone, Loop the Loop and Getting Dirty

- Berry Hunters and Other Stories – (101760) Released: 1999

Episodes include Berry Hunters, Sticky Scary Thing, Snow, Water Works, Cry Wolf, Windy Weather, Poppy's Picnic, Sea-Slide, The Broken Mirror and Autumn

- The Great Race and Other Stories – (102206) Released: 1999

Episodes include The Great Race, A Turn for Worm, Rainy Day Journey, Car on the Hill, Broken Wing, The Baby Bird, Bubbles, Imp's Treasure, Notsy's Trail and The Lost Piano

The episode A Boot Full of Petals was also released on an ABC For Kids Club video in 1998 along with other ABC children's favourites including Bananas in Pyjamas, Hooley Dooleys, Mr Squiggle, Magic Mountain and Mister Whiskers.

== Official website / Removal ==
- In 1999, the ABC later went on to launch a Petals website which contains all the characters, pictures of them, as well as some of their memorable sayings. The site also contains two online activity games which include a jigsaw puzzle and a colouring game, and also some pictures to print out and colour. Additional pictures of the series can also be seen on another print and colour page with other children's programmes from the ABC including Bananas in Pyjamas, Play School, Mixy and Magic Mountain. The online activity games were run by using Shockwave Player. They can also be seen on the Games Centre page with other online activity games featuring other ABC children's programmes. Such as Where's Mixy, Mix n' Match with Bananas in Pyjamas, the Play School Memory Game, the Spud Puzzle from Couch Potato, the Transylvania Slide from Feral TV, and a quiz game. The quiz game focuses on asking questions about different children's programmes and clicking on the correct answer. The show was also listed in the P section of the ABC programmes page, along with many other children's programmes from ABC TV. It includes a synopsis about the show and a screenshot of Imp and Notsy taken from "Firefly Rescue". The show's title is red, while the synopsis is in purple. However, both of them were removed during September 2010 when the new ABC For Kids website was introduced.
- A small video clip of the show can be found at the official ABC Commercial website.

== Reboot ==
In 2013, ABC, Network Ten and China Central Television produced a new series distributed internationally by Daro Film Distribution, developed and produced with the assistance of Film Victoria, developed and financed with the assistance of Screen Australia and produced by Southern Star Entertainment.
