= Shake It... =

Studio album by Endorphin
- Released: 27 September 2004
- Genre: Electronica, trip hop
- Length: 52:32
- Label: ABC Records

Endorphin chronology
Seduction (2003)	Shake It... (2004)	Soon After Silence (2007)

Shake It... is Australian band Endorphin's fifth studio album, released in late 2004.

== Track listing ==
1. "Shukran" - 4:04
2. "To the Rhythm" - 3:29
3. "Love Is a Dancefloor" - 3:32
4. "Yeah Man" - 3:48
5. "Strong Hearts" - 3:27
6. "Over and Over" - 5:04
7. "Rewind" - 3:46
8. "Rocking with the People" - 4:00
9. "Truce" - 3:26
10. "The Night Is Calling" - 3:28
11. "Shake It" - 3:35
12. "Mirage" - 6:53
13. "Inside Your Mind" - 4:03
