= Scott Major =

Australian actor and director (born 1975)

- Born: Scott Ian Major; 4 July 1975 (age 51); Melbourne, Australia
- Occupations: Actor, director, writer
- Years active: 1990–present
- Father: Ian Major

Scott Ian Major (born 4 July 1975) is an Australian actor and TV and film director, known for his roles as Peter Rivers in the 1994 television teen drama series Heartbreak High and Lucas Fitzgerald in soap opera Neighbours. After leaving Neighbours in 2013, Major returned to direct over 200 episodes of the serial. He has since gone on to direct episodes of Playing for Keeps, and two miniseries Lie With Me and Riptide. Major reprised his role as Rivers in the 2022 reboot of Heartbreak High.

== Early life and education ==
Scott Ian Major was born on 4 July 1975. His father was Melbourne radio sports broadcaster Ian Major.

== Career ==
=== Acting ===
Major's acting debut came in the 1990 TV movie More Winners: His Master's Ghost. He played Oates, a student in the comedy series Late For School in 1992, and then joined the cast of Neighbours for three months in 1993 as Darren Stark.

Major appeared in the 1993 Australian romantic comedy film The Heartbreak Kid, with Alex Dimitriades and Claudia Karvan. Major reprised his role as Peter Rivers in Heartbreak High from 1994 to 1995. After finishing up on Heartbreak High in April 1995, Major filmed guest roles in Cody: The Wrong Stuff, which he described as the most challenging of his career, and Police Rescue. He also took a presenting role on the ABC's school series Inside Out, and joined the Foxtel panel show Focus, along with Ally Fowler, Michelle Pettigrove, and John Tarrant. In March 1996, Major guest starred in an episode of G.P. called "Two To Tango", in which he played the teenage lover of a pregnant older woman.

In 1998, he appeared in an episode of All Saints (Season 2 – "If These Walls Could Talk"). Major also guested on Home and Away that year as Murray, a criminal, for five episodes. In 1999, he was cast in the Australian film Envy (titled as The New Girlfriend in the United States). Two years later, he had a small role as a welfare officer in the film adaptation of He Died with a Felafel in His Hand, a movie based on the novel by John Birmingham.

Major played Tom Morgan in the Australian drama Always Greener, which was shown on the Seven Network between 2001 and 2003. In April 2004, Major guested in an episode of Blue Heelers. He also wrote, produced, directed and starred in his own play called Both Sides of the Bar at the 2006 Edinburgh Festival Fringe. Spending two years in the UK, he appeared in an episode of the BBC soap Doctors in 2007, and also starred in the first episode of the second series of Love Soup, a BBC comedy starring Tamsin Greig.

After Major returned to Australia, he was cast as Lucas Fitzgerald in the soap opera Neighbours in July 2008. After five years in the role, Major quit the serial and filmed his exit in June 2013. He subsequently made a number of returns in a guest capacity. He reprised his role for the 30th anniversary in 2015. Further appearances occurred in March 2016, February 2019, and in April 2021. Major reprised the role for a brief appearance during the show's then-final episode in July 2022. In November 2025, it was reported that Major would briefly return as Lucas in December for the final episode of its revival series.

Major reprised his role of Rivers in Netflix's 2022 reboot of Heartbreak High. Of the changes to his character, Major said, "Rivers was a horrible, racist, sexist human being. But by the time he left, he was no longer that person and in this new series, he's on a whole new journey." Rivers is the father of Darren Rivers, one of the main characters, who is queer and non-binary. Major was adamant that Rivers would not be a homophobe and instead accepted Darren for who they were. Major has a part in the upcoming film Residence, playing Cormac the Shepherd. In 2025, he appeared in Alice Maio Mackay's romantic horror film The Serpent's Skin as record shop owner Buzz.

=== Directing ===
During his time in Neighbours, Major directed the 2009 stage production of The Subtle Art of Flirting, which starred his former co-stars Caitlin Stasey and Fletcher Humphrys. The following year, he directed his first episode of Neighbours, which aired in November 2010.

In December 2010, Major told Daniel Kilkelly of Digital Spy that he had directed further episodes of Neighbours with the help of an existing television director. Major admitted that he finds the directing part of his job "very tough to fit it in with the acting" because he is "running from location to location and getting the scene shot and then putting a different hat on and directing a scene." Of his decision to take on the new role, Major has said, "I want to do it all. I also do a lot of writing. I write my own plays and put them on, direct and produce them. Australia is a very small industry acting-wise. I've been doing it professionally for 21 years and you just have to have more strings to your bow than acting."

Major directed episodes of the 2018 drama series Playing for Keeps. In 2019, he won Best Direction in a TV or SVOD Drama Serial for his work on "Episode 7776A" of Neighbours at the Australian Directors' Guild Awards. He was nominated in the same category for "Episode 7776B". He directed over 200 episodes of Neighbours. He went on to direct the 2021 miniseries Lie With Me, created by Neighbours' executive producer Jason Herbison. The following year, he directed Herbison's psychological thriller series Riptide. He also directed the indie thriller film Line of Fire (also known as Darklands), which was nominated for the 2022 AACTA Award for Best Indie Film.

== Personal life ==
Major is also a musician and plays bass guitar.

He supports the Western Bulldogs in the Australian Football League.

== Filmography ==
=== Actor ===
Year	Title	Role	Notes
1990	More Winners	Martin Taylor	Episode: "His Master's Ghost"
1992	Late For School	Oates	Main cast
1993	The Heartbreak Kid	Rivers	
1993	Neighbours	Darren Stark	Recurring role
1994	Newlyweds		Episode: "The Holiday"
1994	Cody: The Wrong Stuff	Dave	TV film
1994–1995	Heartbreak High	Peter Rivers	Main cast
1996	G.P.	Matt Malouf	Episode: "Two to Tango"
1996	Blue Heelers	Andy Sexton	Episode: "Under Pressure"
1996	Water Rats	Flasher	Episode: "Unfinished Business"
1996	Police Rescue	Robbie Crichton	Episode: "The River"
1997	Good Guys, Bad Guys	Spike	Episode: "New Dogs, Old Tricks"
1998	Wildside	Steven Nolan	
1998	Home and Away	Murray	Recurring role
1999	Envy	Nick	
1999	All Saints	Jason Richard	
2000	Blue Heelers	Steve Scarcella	Episode: "A Little Faith"
2001	He Died with a Felafel in His Hand	Welfare Officer	
2001–2003	Always Greener	Tom Morgan	Main cast
2003	Ned	Policeman Roy	
2004	Blue Heelers	Will Graham	Episode: "Running Scared"
2006	Doctors	Brian "Bondi" Price	Episode: "Going Walkabout"
2007	City Homicide	Graeme Combes	Episode: "Rostered Day Off"
2008	Love Soup	Keith	Episode: "Integrated Logistics"
2008–2022, 2025	Neighbours	Lucas Fitzgerald	Main cast
2014	Chris & Josh	Cecil	Episode: "Interrogation"
2018	Trench	Tom Jackman	
2022	Heartbreak High	Peter Rivers	Main cast
2022	Riptide	Daniel Burrell	Guest; also director
2023	Scrublands	Tom Newkirk	4 episodes
2024	Til You Make It		
2025	Long Night in Pexington	Mr. Tyler	
2025	The Serpent's Skin	Buzz	
TBA	Residence	Cormac the Shepherd	Pre-production

=== Director ===
Year	Title	Notes
2013–2025	Neighbours	222 episodes
2018–2019	Playing for Keeps	6 episodes
2021	With Intent	4 episodes
2022	Line of Fire	Feature film
2022	Riptide	4 episodes
2024	Til You Make It	Also producer
