= Nicholas Jose =

Australian novelist

- Born: Robert Nicholas Jose; 9 November 1952; London, England
- Occupation: Novelist
- Writing career
- Notable awards: 2010 New South Wales Premier's Literary Awards — Special Award, winner

Robert Nicholas Jose (born 9 November 1952), known as Nicholas, is an Australian novelist.

== Early life and education ==
Robert Nicholas Jose, known as Nicholas, was born on 9 November 1952 in London, England, to Australian parents. After the family moved to Australia, he grew up in Broken Hill, Traralgon, Perth, and Adelaide.

He was educated at the Australian National University (ANU), before being awarded a Rhodes Scholarship to Oxford University in 1974.

== Career ==
Jose has travelled extensively, particularly in China, where he worked from 1986 to 1990. He has lived and worked in Canberra and other parts of Australia as well as in England, Italy, and China. He was an English lecturer at ANU, and was a cultural counsellor for the Australian Embassy in Beijing from 1987 to 1990.

He was Visiting Chair of Australian Studies at Harvard University from 2009 to 2010, and in 2012 was Professor of English and Creative Writing both at the University of Adelaide and Bath Spa University, England.

In early 2017 Jose became involved in a research project, Other Worlds: Forms of "World Literature", for which he is leading a theme on "Antipodean China", exploring the relationship between Chinese literature and world literature.

=== Writing ===
Jose has written widely on contemporary art and literature from Asia and the Pacific. He has also written short stories, novels, and a book on English literature, based on as his doctoral thesis. He wrote Paper Nautilus and Avenue of Eternal Peace while living in Italy and China.

He won a Literature Board Fellowship in 1989 and 1997.

== Other activities ==
Jose was president of Sydney PEN from 2002 to 2005.

In 2016 Jose presented "Gifts from China" for the Eric Rolls Memorial Lecture.

== Awards and nominations ==
- 1973 University Medal for English, Australian National University
- 1990 shortlisted for the Miles Franklin Award - Avenue of Eternal Peace
- 1997 shortlisted for the Commonwealth Writers' Prize, South-East Asia - The Custodians
- 2003 shortlisted for The Age Book of the Year, Non-fiction - Black Sheep

== Bibliography ==
=== Novels ===
- Rowena's Field (1984)
- Paper Nautilus (1987)
- Avenue of Eternal Peace (1989)
- The Rose Crossing (1994)
- The Custodians (1997)
- The Red Thread (2000)
- Original Face (2005)
- The Idealist (2023)

=== Short story collections ===
- The Possession of Amber (1980)
- Feathers or Lead (1986)
- Bapo (2014)

=== Non-fiction ===
- Chinese Whispers (1995)
- Black Sheep: Journey to Borroloola (2002)

=== As editor ===
- Macquarie PEN Anthology of Australian Literature (2009)
- The Literature of Australia (2009)

=== As writer ===
- Children of the Dragon (novel) (1 episode, 1992)
