= Ian Major =

Australian sports broadcaster

Ian James Major (19 September 1943 – 28 January 2009) was an Australian sports broadcaster.

Chiefly known for commentary in Australian rules football, Major broadcast Victorian Football League matches with Melbourne radio station 3XY from 1966 to 1969. He formed an association with 3KZ for 21 years (1970–1991), commentating on VFL/AFL matches. His partner in the commentary box was Richmond's Jack "Captain Blood" Dyer, leading to the reference of the duo as "The Captain and the Major". They were named Australasia's top sporting commentators and given a Pater award. Major had also won awards as Australia's top sporting commentator in 1977 and 78 and when commercial radio introduced the Rawards, Major took the title in 1990 and was runner-up in 1991.

Major was one of three callers for FARB (Federation Australian Radio Broadcasters) at the 1972 Summer Olympics in Munich handling swimming, track and field, cycling and boxing. He covered the 1982 Commonwealth Games in Brisbane as track and field caller and provided general coverage of the 1990 Commonwealth Games in Auckland.

During 21 years with 3KZ, Major was sporting director but at various stages held the additional titles of manager, programme manager and assistant news editor. He was chairman of the Commercial Radio Football sub-committee which dealt with VFL/AFL over broadcasting rights and conditions for broadcasters.

When 3KZ dropped coverage of the AFL at the end of 1991, Major was hired by 3EE The Breeze. That station was sold to Wesgo after less than two years. Major also worked for the rebranded Magic 693, 3UZ, 3LO and 3AK. In 2004 and 2005, Major was a co-host on the 1116 SEN program Weekend Leave Pass with Russell Gilbert and Mark Fine

He was known almost exclusively as "Maj". He died as the result of cancer at Cabrini Hospital in Melbourne. He was married, with three children (including Scott Major) and five grandchildren.
