= Jeff Truman =

Australian television writer

Jeffrey Maxwell Truman (4 November 1957 – 2 December 2014) was an Australian film and television screenwriter and actor.

== Career ==
A member of the Australian Writer Guild for more than 30 years, Truman's television credits include Rescue: Special Ops, City Homicide, Packed to the Rafters, The Strip, Sea Patrol, Last Man Standing, The Alice, Stingers (nominated for an AWGIE Award for episode 118), McLeod's Daughters, Neighbours (for which he wrote 148 episodes, and was also nominated for an AWGIE Award for episode 4155), Home and Away, E Street, A Country Practice, Fat Tony & Co., Winter, and The Doctor Blake Mysteries. He also wrote for Underbelly: Razor (nominated for an AWGIE award in 2012), Underbelly: Badness, and Underbelly: Squizzy. In total Truman received five AWGIE nominations and in 2013, won the award for Best Original Mini Series for Underbelly: Badness.

Truman wrote the feature film Envy, which premiered at the Toronto International Film Festival in 1999. He also had a small role in Bryan Singer's Superman Returns.

Truman died on 2 December 2014, after suffering a brain haemorrhage; he was 57.

== Filmography ==
=== Film ===
Year	Title	Role	Note
1982	Running on Empty	Country Boy	Film
1983	The Wild Duck	Johnson	Film
1983	Chase Through the Night	Eric	TV movie
1984	Fast Talking	Detective	Film
1985	Bliss	Joel	Film
1986	The Blue Lightning	Sky Operator	TV movie
1987	Bullseye	Sergeant Willis	Film
1987	Cassandra	Devlin	Film
1988	The 13th Floor	Bert	Film
1988	Fragments of War: The Story of Damien Parer	Osmar White	TV movie
1988	A Cry in the Dark	Mr. McCombe	Film
1989	The Heroes	Cobber Cain	TV movie
1990	Secret Weapon	Stephen Grey	TV movie
1991	Flirting	Mr. Morris Cutts	Film
1991	Till There Was You	Nobby	Film
1991	Spotswood	Ron	Film
1993	Shotgun Wedding	Detective Ted Jones	Film
1995	Rough Diamonds	Arthur Holdings	Film
1996	Race the Sun	Ed Webster	Film
1996	Lilian's Story	Head Orderly	Film
1996	Whipping Boy	Bert	Film
1997	Doing Time for Patsy Cline	Warren	Film
1999	Envy (aka The New Girlfriend)	Phil	Film
2002	The Quiet American	Dancing American	Film
2002	The Nugget	George	Film
2006	Superman Returns	Gil	Film
2012	Careless Love	Client with Dog	Film

=== Television ===
Year	Title	Role	Note
1983	Patrol Boat	Lieutenant Mitchell	TV series Episode: "Tango Victor"
1983	Scales of Justice	Detective Sergeant Matthews	Miniseries; 2 episodes
1985	Colour in the Creek	Farmer	TV series Episode: "The Great Depression"
1985	A Thousand Skies	George Pond	Miniseries; Episodes: "Chapter 3: The Challenges / Chapter 4: The Triumph"
1986	The Challenge	Johan Valentijn	Miniseries
1988	Home and Away	Sam Barlow	TV series 19 episodes
1988	A Country Practice	Tim Flanagan / Alby Goddard	TV series 4 episodes
1990	The Flying Doctors	Barry	TV series 2 episodes
1991	The Great Air Race	Geoff Hernsworth	Miniseries; 2 episodes
1992	G.P.	Terry Duncan	TV series Episode: "The Last Waltz"
1992	Children of the Dragon	Theo	TV series TV series
1992	Police Rescue	Harry Green	TV series Episode: "Judgement Day"
1992	The Adventures of Skippy	Manager / Gareth	TV series 2 episodes
1993	Home and Away	Matthew Thompson	TV series 32 episodes
1993	The Girl from Tomorrow Part II: Tomorrow's End	Manager	Miniseries
1994	Time Trax	Jake	TV series Episode: "A Close Encounter"
1999	Dog's Head Bay	Mike	TV series 7 episodes
2014	A Place to Call Home	Father Joe	TV series 4 episodes (final appearance)

== Writing ==
Year	Title	Note
1989-93	E Street	TV series
1992	Children of the Dragon	TV series 4 episodes
1994	A Country Practice	TV series 2 episodes
1999	Envy (aka The New Girlfriend)	Film
2000	Above the Law	TV series 1 episode
2003	McLeod's Daughters	TV series 2 episodes
2004	Stingers	TV series 31 episodes
2005	Last Man Standing	TV series 1 episode
2005	Blue Heelers	TV series 2 episodes
2006	The Alice	Miniseries; 3 episodes
2008	The Strip	TV series
2009	All Saints	TV series 8 episodes
2009	Rescue Special Ops	TV series 1 episodes
2010	Rush	TV series 2 episodes
2010	City Homicide	TV series 9 episodes
2011	Sea Patrol	TV series 14 episodes
2011	Underbelly: Razor	TV series
2012	Tricky Business	TV series 2 episodes
2012	Underbelly: Badness	TV series
2013	Underbelly: Squizzy	TV series
2013	Packed to the Rafters	TV series 10 episodes
2013	Home and Away	TV series 4 episodes
2014	Fat Tony & Co.	TV series 2 episodes
2014	Neighbours	TV series 148 episodes
2015	Winter	TV series
2015	The Doctor Blake Mysteries	TV series 1 episode
