= Skin (Endorphin album) =

Studio album by Endorphin
- Released: 1999
- Genre: Electronica, trip hop
- Label: Epic

Endorphin chronology
Embrace (1998)	Skin (1999)	AM:PM (2001)

Skin is the second album by Australian electronica artist, Endorphin, released in 1999, which peaked at No. 32 on the ARIA Albums Chart. At the ARIA Music Awards of 2000 Endorphin was nominated for Best Male Artist for this album.

== Track listing ==
Skin

1. "Blue Moon (The Cosmix/Radio Edit)" - 3:44
2. "Anguish" - 3:28
3. "Passage" - 3:57
4. "Afterwords" - 3:44
5. "Higher" - 4:19
6. "Time" - 4:37
7. "Red" - 4:06
8. "Skin" - 3:37
9. "Grey" - 3:41
10. "Heat" - 3:21
11. "Radio Funk" - 3:07
12. "Zoe" - 13:28

Re-Embrace (Bonus Disc)

1. "Free (Free Range Mix)" - 4:53
2. "Solar Flare (Disaster Area Remix)" - 4:05
3. "Satie (Remember Satie Radio Edit)" - 4:10
4. "Relapse (Our House Remix)" - 6:43
5. "Satie (Astral Project Remix)" - 6:56
