= Martin Fabinyi =

Australian film director and music label owner

- Born: Australia
- Occupations: Record label owner; producer; director; screenwriter
- Years active: 1972–present

Martin Fabinyi is an Australian film and television producer and director and music label owner. He has also written books on the local rock music scene. He is known for being the co-founder of independent record label, Regular Records, in 1978, signing up Mental as Anything shortly afterwards.

== Early life and education ==
Martin Fabinyi grew up in Melbourne, Victoria.

After leaving school he joined GTV-9 as a floor manager and film editor.

Fabinyi Flinders University in Adelaide, South Australia, where he founded and edited the student newspaper Empire Times in March 1969, but left after two years without completing a degree.

== Career ==
Fabinyi subsequently moved to Sydney, New South Wales, and began directing independent video films. He was part of the experimental movement Bush Video at the Aquarius Festival at Nimbin in 1973. He wrote articles on the music scene and designed album covers before meeting Cameron Allan in 1977.

In 1978 Allan and Fabinyi teamed up to finance a film project, The Lipstick Killers. To raise money they formed an independent label, Regular Records, in September of that year. The first artists they signed to the label was Mental As Anything, a Sydney-based new wave music group. The label subsequently released music from many other well-known bands and musicians.

Fabinyi was the chief executive officer of Mushroom Pictures from its formation in 1993 to 2009. Mushroom Pictures' projects include the features Cut (2000), featuring Molly Ringwald; Chopper (2000); and Macbeth (2006), among others.

He joined Beyond Productions in 2010 where he co-produced the theatrical documentary The Angels: Kickin' Down the Door (2022), about rock band The Angels. The film was produced by Peter Hanlon, with co-producers Rick Davies, Bettina Hamilton, and Fabinyi.

He also executive produced John Farnham: Finding the Voice, which won the AACTA Award for Best Documentary. and was a producer on Midnight Oil: The Hardest Line (2024).

As of June 2026 Fabinyi is head of feature films & documentaries at Beyond Entertainment.

== Awards and nominations ==
- 2003: AFI Awards – Best Film - Gettin' Square – nominee
- 2015: 15th Screen Producers Australia Awards - Documentary Television Production - Blood and Thunder - nominee
- 2024: AACTA Award for Best Documentary Feature - John Farnham: Finding the Voice - winner

== Books ==
Fabinyi co-authored a number of books:

- Fabinyi, Martin (1972). X: A Film. ISBN 0-9599297-0-3.
- Morris, Philip; Martin Fabinyi (1976). The Bumper Book of Rock. Collingwood, Vic: Outback Press. ISBN 0-86888-043-4.
- Creswell, Toby; Martin Fabinyi (1999). The Real Thing: Adventures in Australian Rock & Roll, 1957-now. Milsons Point, NSW: Random House. ISBN 978-0-09-183547-7.

== Filmography ==
Credits:

- TV Dinner (1973) – video: filmmaker
- The Vacuum (1975) – video feature: director, writer, producer
- Pure S (1975) - feature film: writer, ("The Vacuum")
- Great Southern Land (1982) Icehouse (film clip) - co-director with Larry Meltzer
- She's The One (1987) The Cockroaches (film clip - director
- Around The World In Eighty Ways (1988) - feature film: music consultant
- The Crossing (1990) – feature film: music co-ordinator
- Tribal Voice – Yothu Yindi (1993) – TV documentary: producer
- Fashion (1993) – TV series: executive producer
- Kate Ceberano & Friends (1993) – TV series: executive producer
- Next to Nothing/Nothing to Hide (1995) – TV series: executive producer
- Counting the Beat (1996) – TV documentary: executive producer
- The Singer and the Swinger (1999) – documentary: executive producer
- Cut (2000) – feature film: producer
- Chopper (2000) – feature film: executive producer
- Horseplay (2003) – feature film: executive producer
- The National Karaoke Challenge (2004) - TV series: executive producer
- Gettin' Square (2003) – feature film: producer
- Wolf Creek (2005) – feature film: executive producer
- Macbeth (2006) – producer
- Storm Warning (2007) – feature film: executive producer
- Great Australian Albums (2007, 2008) – TV series: executive producer
- Cannot Buy My Soul (2008) – feature documentary: executive producer
- Cedar Boys (2009) – feature film: executive producer
- Bait 3D (2011) – feature film: co-executive producer
- Manny Lewis (2015) – feature film: producer
- Blood + Thunder: The Story of Alberts (2015) – TV documentary mini-series
- Indigo Lake (2016) – feature film: executive producer
- Backburning (2018) – short documentary: producer
- Days Like These (2022) – TV series: executive producer
- The Angels: Kickin' Down the Door (2022) – producer
- John Farnham: Finding the Voice (2023) – feature documentary: executive producer
- The Hardest Line (2024) – feature documentary: producer
- Live It Up: The Mental As Anything Story (March 2026) - feature documentary: executive producer
