= Great Australian Albums =

- Created by: Toby Creswell
- Written by: Toby Creswell
- Directed by: Larry Meltzer
- Presented by: Toby Creswell
- Starring: Silverchair; Crowded House; The Triffids; The Saints; The Go-Betweens; Nick Cave and the Bad Seeds; Hunters & Collectors; Powderfinger
- Country of origin: Australia
- Original language: English
- No. of seasons: 2
- No. of episodes: 8

Production
- Executive producer: Martin Fabinyi
- Producers: Toby Creswell; Larry Meltzer; Danielle Kelly
- Running time: 52 min
- Production company: Mushroom Pictures

Original release
- Network: SBS-TV
- Release: 28 July 2007 – 27 September 2008

Great Australian Albums was an Australian TV documentary series, which was broadcast on SBS-TV for two seasons (2007 and 2008) of four episodes each. The first season commenced on 28 July 2007 and was written by Toby Creswell with Larry Meltzer directing, while Creswell and Meltzer were co-producers for Mushroom Pictures. Each 52-minute episode was presented by Creswell and dealt with a separate Australian album. It received funding from Film Finance Corporation Australia (FFC). Season two, which was broadcast from 6 September 2008, followed the same format with Creswell and Meltzer reprising their roles except it was co-produced by Creswell with Danielle Kelly.

Season one episodes were: Silverchair's Diorama (2002) broadcast on 28 July 2007, Crowded House's Woodface (1991) on 4 August, The Triffid's Born Sandy Devotional (1986) on 11 August, and finished on 18 August, with the Saints' (I'm) Stranded (1976). The episodes were issued on DVDs by SBS and distributed by Madman Entertainment in late 2007. Season two described the Go-Betweens' 16 Lovers Lane (1988), Nick Cave and the Bad Seeds' Murder Ballads (1996), Hunters & Collectors' Human Frailty (1986), and Powderfinger's Odyssey Number Five (2000). Season two episodes were released on DVDs in late 2008.
