= Abi Tucker =

Australian singer-songwriter and actress

- Born: Abigail Anne Tucker; 22 January 1973 (age 53); Australia
- Occupations: Television and film actress, singer-songwriter
- Years active: 1994−present
- Known for: Heartbreak High, The Secret Life of Us, McLeod's Daughters, The Wog Boy
- Partner: Chris Rochester
- Children: 2

Abigail Anne "Abi" Tucker (born 22 January 1973) is an Australian singer-songwriter and actress. She has had roles in television series-telemovies in Heartbreak High (1994-1995), Water Rats (1999), Wildside (1999), The Secret Life of Us (2001-2003), My Husband, my Killer (2001), McLeod's Daughters (2007-2009), Giggle and Hoot (2010) ABC's Play School (2006-2010); and in films The New Girlfriend (original title: Envy) (1996), Angst (2000) and The Wog Boy (2000). Her theatre credits include The Vagina Monologues (2000), Everything's F***ed workshop (2003), The Music and Lyrics of Sean Peter (2003), Breakfast with Jonny Wilkinson (2005), Poor Boy – Music of Tim Finn (2010) and Bell Shakespeare's As You Like It (2015).

== Career ==
Abigail Anne Tucker came to public attention as a singer on the Australian program, New Faces in the early 1990s and in 1994 landed a role in the Australian TV series Heartbreak High in which she also contributed to the series music soundtrack. Tucker recorded her first EP of original music in 1994 called, "Breathe In'which was produced by Dorian West and released through Shock Records, before moving to the UK.

During an extended stay in London, Tucker teamed up with musician/songwriter Davi Taylor to form 'grunge rock' band 'Bully'. The pair recorded an unreleased EP of songs at AIR studios with producer, Eric Rosse before relations at EMI Records folded and Tucker returned to Australia to work on acclaimed series, Wildside.

Films Angst and The Wog Boy followed, as well as roles in Water Rats, My Husband, My Killer and Envy, plus a stage production of The Vagina Monologues, during which time Tucker continued to write and record music. Tucker contributed two tracks to the soundtrack of Angst. She then landed the role of Miranda Lang in the series, The Secret Life of Us and appeared on the music soundtrack with two of her own tracks and another track written by Don Walker which she performed called, "Everybody". During almost three series of The Secret Life of Us, Tucker performed guest vocals on various albums: White Noise by Alpinestars, AM PM by Endorphin, and a remix of her track "Move You" was released by the Wicked Beat Sound System.

She contributed backing vocals to some songs on David McCormack's debut solo album, Candy in 2002. Tucker also wrote the majority of her album, Dreamworld, which was co-produced by producers including Bob Scott, Sean Peter, Daniel Denholm and Phillip Buckle and mixed by Bob Scott. Dreamworld was released in 2003 through Shock Records.

Tucker followed the release by an extensive tour throughout Australia with guitarist / producer Sydney Green.

In 2005, Tucker was offered a role at the Menier Chocolate Factory in London in a play by Chris England called Breakfast with Jonny Wilkinson taking her back to the UK. The play also went to the Edinburgh Festival in 2006.

After landing the role of Grace McLeod in McLeod's Daughters in 2007, Tucker moved to Adelaide where she finished writing and recording her second album, One December Moon. She also performed in a number of the songs featured in the series.

In 2008, One December Moon was released through MGM Records and Edel Records in Germany, Austria and Switzerland, followed by an Australian tour. Tucker then went back to Europe to perform as support for Melanie Safka throughout Germany on her 'Working Legends' tour.

In 2010, Tucker appeared in the MTC / STC production of Matt Cameron's Poor Boy alongside Guy Pearce (MTC season) and Matt Newton (STC Season). The same year she scored a presenters role on ABC's Play School and also toured extensively with the show throughout Australia.

In 2012, Tucker briefly puppeteered and voiced the character of Hootabelle on Giggle and Hoot while continuing to write and record material for her third album. In 2013, Tucker met guitarist / songwriter Julian Curwin and together they began work on a side project of songs and formed the duo The Falling Seeds.

Tucker performed the roles of Amiens and Audrey in Bell Shakespeare's As You Like It in Sydney, Canberra and Melbourne. She returned to Sydney and the Falling Seeds' debut album was launched on 28 May 2015 and released digitally through noisehive.com.

== Personal life ==
Tucker has two daughters, Hazel (2014) and Pepper (2015) with partner Chris Rochester.

== Filmography ==
=== Film ===
Year	Title	Role	Notes
1999	Envy	Lissa	Feature film
2000	The Wog Boy	Annie O'Brien	Feature film
2000	Angst	May	Feature film
2001	My Husband, My Killer	Michelle	TV movie
2003	Love Bytes	Bea	TV movie

=== Television ===
Year	Title	Role	Notes
1994-1995	Heartbreak High	Jodie Cooper	TV series, 64 episodes
1996	Water Rats	Amy Collins	TV series, episode: "Quad Squad"
1998	Wildside	Kate Holbeck	TV series, episode: "1.40"
2001-2003	The Secret Life of Us	Miranda Lang	TV series, 55 episodes
2001	National Geographic Presents	Narrator/Presenter	Documentary
2007-2009	McLeod's Daughters	Grace Kingston McLeod	TV series, 45 episodes
2010–present	Play School	Presenter	TV series
2010	Cops L.A.C.	Nina Blunt / Amanda Hodge	TV series, episode: "Blood Types"
2012	Giggle and Hoot	Hootabelle (puppeteer / voice)	TV series

== Theatre ==
Year	Title	Role	Notes
2000	The Vagina Monologues		
2003	Everything's F***ed workshop		
2003	Suitcase - Music and Lyrics of Sean Peter		
2005–06	Breakfast with Jonny Wilkinson	Lena	Menier Chocolate Factory & Edinburgh Festival
2010	Poor Boy - Music of Tim Finn	Claire	STC / MTC
2015	As You Like It	Amiens / Audrey	Bell Shakespeare

== Discography ==
=== Studio albums ===
Year	Album details
1995	Breathe In: First studio EP; Label: Shock Records
2003	Dreamworld: First studio album; Release date: 2003; Label: Kellet Street Records
2008	One December Moon: Second studio album; Release date: September 2008; Label: Kellet Street Records
2015	The Falling Seeds: Collaboration with Julian Curwin; Third studio album; Label: Digital Downloads - Noisehive.com
2020	Who Do You Really Know?: Release date: January 2020

=== Singles ===
Title	Year	Peak chart positions	Album
Title	Year	AUS	Album
"Everybody"	2001	78	The Secret Life of Us
