= Embrace (Endorphin album) =

1998 debut album of electronic band Endorphin

Studio album by Endorphin
- Released: 1998
- Genre: Electronica, trip hop
- Label: Epic

Endorphin chronology
| Embrace (1998) | Skin (1999) |

Embrace is the debut album by the Australian band Endorphin, released in early 1998. Shortly after its release, Endorphin was chosen to support Portishead on their April 1998 tour, and then Massive Attack in their June 1998 tour. The album had sold over 15,000 copies worldwide by 2002.

== Track listing ==
| No. | Title | Length |
|---|---|---|
| 1. | "Satie 1" | 3:07 |
| 2. | "Relapse" | 4:21 |
| 3. | "Doubt" | 4:13 |
| 4. | "Solar Flare" | 3:51 |
| 5. | "Free" | 4:07 |
| 6. | "Embrace" | 5:05 |
| 7. | "Underwater Jungle" | 5:09 |
| 8. | "Voyage" | 4:06 |
| 9. | "Phantom" | 3:02 |
| 10. | "Static" | 4:05 |
| 11. | "Other Worlds" | 4:38 |
| 12. | "Satie 2" | 3:24 |

== Personnel ==
- Eric Chapus (Endorphin)
