= Karaoke High =

Karaoke High is a short-lived New Zealand television drama series that aired on TVNZ. It was created by Sarah Mayberry and Kirsty McKenzie. The first episode was shown on the TVNZ website one week before it was shown on television. The first series screened week nights between 18 December 2006 and 5 January 2007 as a replacement for Shortland Street over the Summer Holidays. Karaoke High reruns were shown on TV2 at 2.00 p.m. on Saturdays, but it is no longer aired in New Zealand. The show has since been re-run on ABC3 in Australia.

Miriama Smith starred, along with Phil Brown who has had numerous roles in shows such as Shortland Street, Outrageous Fortune, Power Rangers, The Last Samurai, Luella Miller, The Market, and others. It also show featured dancers, such as Kate Reese.

The show was filmed on location at St. Patrick's College, Silverstream.
