= Swinging (TV series) =

- Written by: Michael Cove; David Evans; Debra Oswald; Joan Sauers; Angela Webber; David Witt
- Directed by: Stephen Burstow
- Starring: Simone O’ Brian; Philip Dodd; Celia Ireland; Scott Bowie; Lisa Adam; Emma De Vries; Mal Heap; Terry Ryan
- Theme music composer: James Freud
- Opening theme: Swinging performed by James Freud
- Ending theme: Swinging instrumental version
- Composer: Peter Dasent
- Country of origin: Australia
- Original language: English
- No. of seasons: 1
- No. of episodes: 14

Production
- Executive producer: Mark Barnard
- Producer: Deborah Boerne
- Running time: 10 minutes

Original release
- Network: ABC
- Release: 10 September – 29 September 1997

Swinging was an Australian children's television show that aired on the ABC from 10 to 29 September 1997, airing in reruns until January 2001.

== Characters ==
=== Main ===
- Simone O'Brien as Rosy Turvey
- Celia Ireland as Filameena Turvey
- Philip Dodd as Augustus Turvey
- Emma De Vries as Tipsy Turvey

=== Recurring ===
- Scott Bowie as Theodore Curly
- Lisa Adam as Mitzi Tangle
- Mal Heap as Alf (talking tree)
- Terry Ryan as Bert (talking tree)
