= Sarah Mayberry =

Australian author and screenwriter

- Born: Melbourne, Victoria, Australia
- Occupations: Author, screenwriter
- Writing career
- Genre: Romance fiction
- Website: sarahmayberry.com

Sarah Mayberry is an Australian contemporary romance author and television screenwriter. She has written several novels for Harlequin Mills and Boon, as well as scripts for the television soap opera Neighbours. She was a storyliner for the New Zealand medical drama Shortland Street and co-created the teen drama series Karaoke High with Kirsty McKenzie. Mayberry and her works have been nominated for several awards, and she won the Favourite Erotic Romance accolade at the Australian Romance Readers Awards in 2015.

== Early life ==
Mayberry was born in Melbourne. She grew up in the suburb of Wantirna. Mayberry knew from a young age that she wanted to be a writer and began writing stories during school. She attended Victoria College, where she met her partner Christopher Gist. They both studied a Bachelor of Arts degree in Professional Writing and Literature. Mayberry went on to work for the parent company of Australian hardware and garden centre chain Bunnings. She also wrote for The Australian Hardware Journal and "a consumer aimed renovation magazine" for hardware store Mitre 10.

== Writing career ==
Mayberry decided to write romance novels, as that it was she liked to read herself. She wrote some Regency romances, but they were rejected by Harlequin Mills and Boon and she decided to pursue a career in journalism. After reading Jennifer Crusie's Anyone But You, Mayberry was inspired to write romance novels again and she made sure her characters were "human and like people I knew". Harlequin Mills and Boon published her first novel Can't Get Enough in 2006. Mayberry has written over 45 romance novels.

Mayberry has worked as a storyliner and scriptwriter for the Australian soap opera Neighbours since 1998. When the series was cancelled in 2022, Mayberry had written 230 episodes of Neighbours. She later returned to the script department when the serial was picked up by Amazon Freevee. Mayberry credited her time with the show with helping her to become a better romance writer. After plotting a long term romance between two characters, she realised where she had been going wrong in her own writing. In 2005, Mayberry wrote three novellas based on characters from the show.

Mayberry has also worked as a storyliner on Shortland Street and Home and Away. She co-created the 2006 New Zealand teen drama series Karaoke High with Kirsty McKenzie. They first approached TVNZ with their idea in 2003, and the network developed the show into a three-week soap opera. Mayberry wrote the novelization of the television drama The Lost Children for Penguin Books. In July 2022, Mayberry confirmed that she was working on a romantic comedy series to air in the United States and a thriller series for the UK. She produced the feature film Line of Fire along with her partner Christopher Gist, who also wrote the script. The film was shot on the Mornington Peninsula and even filmed in the couple's house. In 2024, Mayberry won the Best Script for a Television Serial accolade for Episode 8867 of Neighbours.

== Bibliography ==
Harlequin Blaze novels

- Can't Get Enough (2005)
- Burning Up (2008)
- Below the Belt (2008)
- She's Got It Bad (2009)
- Her Secret Fling (2009)
- Hot Island Nights (2010)

Neighbours novellas

- Rising Star (2005)
- Sisters in the City (2005)
- Summer Harvest (2005)

Secret Lives of Daytime Divas

- Take On Me (2007)
- All Over You (2007)
- Hot For Him (2007)

Harlequin Super Romance

- The Best Laid Plans (2010)
- More Than One Night (2012)
- Her Best Worst Mistake (2012)
- Within Reach (2012)
- The Other Side of Us (2013)
- Temporary (with Sarina Bowen) (2017)

Porter Family

- All They Need (2011)
- Suddenly You (2012)

Mathew Sisters

- Her Favorite Temptation (2013)
- Her Favorite Rival (2013)

Brothers Ink

- Satisfaction (2014)
- Anticipation (2015)

Montana Born

- Almost a Bride (2014)
- Make Believe Wedding (2014)
- Bound to the Bachelor (2015)
- His Christmas Gift (2015)
- Tanner (2017)

Carmody Brothers

- The Cowboy Meets His Match (2018)
- The Rebel and the Cowboy (2019)
- More Than a Cowboy (2020)

Others

- Cruise Control (2006)
- Anything For You (2006)
- Amorous Liaisons (2008)
- A Natural Father (2009)
- Home For the Holidays (2009)
- Her Best Friend (2010)
- The Last Goodbye (2011)
- One Good Reason (2011)
- Her Kind of Trouble (2014)
- Wait For Me (2015)
- The Cowboy Meets His Match (2018)
- Must Love Coffee (2019)

== Recognition ==
Year	Award	Category	Work	Result	Ref(s)
2008	Romance Writers of Australia	Short Category	Island Heat	Nominated	
2012	Australian Romance Readers Awards	Favourite Australian Romance Author	—N/a	Nominated	
2012	Australian Romance Readers Awards	Favourite Love Scene from A Romance Published in 2012	Suddenly You	Nominated	
2012	Australian Romance Readers Awards	Favourite Short/Category Romance	Her Best Worst Mistake	Nominated	
2012	Australian Romance Readers Awards	Favourite Short/Category Romance	Suddenly You	Nominated	
2012	Romance Writers of Australia	Long Romance	The Best Laid Plans	Nominated	
2013	Romance Writers of Australia	Long Romance	More Than One Night	Nominated	
2014	Romance Writers of Australia	Long Romance	Her Favourite Rival	Won	
2015	Australian Romance Readers Awards	Favourite Australian Romance Author	—N/a	Nominated	
2015	Australian Romance Readers Awards	Favourite Erotic Romance	Anticipation	Won	
2015	Australian Romance Readers Awards	Favourite Short/Category Romance	Bound to the Bachelor	Nominated	
2015	Romance Writers of America	Contemporary Romance: Mid-Length	Her Kind of Trouble	Nominated	
2017	Australian Romance Readers Awards	Favourite Continuing Romance Series	American Extreme Bull Riders Tour (Note: shared with Barbara Dunlop, Kelly Hunter, Megan Crane, Amy Andrews, Sinclair Jayne, Jeannie Watt and Katherine Garbera.)	Nominated	
2024	AWGIE Awards	Best Script for a Television Serial	Neighbours Episode 8867	Won	
