= Soon After Silence =

Studio album by Endorphin
- Released: 14 May 2007
- Genre: Electronica, trip hop
- Label: Endorphin Music

Endorphin chronology
Shake It... (2004)	Soon After Silence (2007)

Soon After Silence is the sixth studio album from the Australian electronica artist Endorphin, released in 2007.

== Track listing ==
1. "Lila"
2. "Brooklyn"
3. "Every Moment"
4. "Soon After Silence"
5. "Angels"
6. "Gate 23"
7. "Spring Interlude"
8. "Point Blank"
9. "Touch"
10. "Night-time Butterfly"
11. "Bastille"
12. "Dawn"
13. "Shibuya"
14. "Glenrowan"
