= Line of Fire (film) =

2022 Australian film

Line of Fire (also known as Darklands) is a 2022 Australian psychological thriller film, directed by Scott Major and written by Christopher Gist, who also produced it along with Sarah Mayberry and Shane Isheev.

Production began in February/March 2021 and it was filmed on the Mornington Peninsula, with locations including the Mount Eliza Woodlands, McClelland High School, and Gist and Mayberry's house.

A reviewer for Film Threat wrote: "Everything was set up plot-wise for a satisfying revenge thriller, but it felt like some of the steam from the sails got let out a bit by all the twists and turns. It’s still an enjoyable movie and definitely less predictable than I thought it would be."

Darklands received a nomination for the AACTA Award for Best Indie Film in 2022.

== Cast ==
- Nadine Garner as Samantha Romans
- Samantha Tolj as Jamie Connard
- Damian Walshe-Howling
- Brett Cousins
- Nicholas Coghlan
- Texas Watterston
