= The Night We Called It a Day (film) =

- Theatrical release poster
- Directed by: Paul Goldman
- Written by: Peter Clifton; Michael Thomas
- Starring: Dennis Hopper; Melanie Griffith; Portia de Rossi; Joel Edgerton; Rose Byrne; David Hemmings
- Cinematography: Danny Ruhlmann
- Music by: Rupert Gregson-Williams
- Distributed by: ContentFilm International
- Release date: 2003
- Running time: 97 minutes
- Country: Australia
- Language: English

The Night We Called It a Day, also known as All the Way, is a 2003 Australian-American comedy drama film directed by Paul Goldman, starring Dennis Hopper as Frank Sinatra and Melanie Griffith as Barbara Marx. It also features Portia de Rossi, Joel Edgerton, Rose Byrne and David Hemmings. The movie is based on the true events surrounding Sinatra's 1974 tour in Australia. When the singer calls a local reporter (de Rossi) a "two-bit hooker", every union in the country black-bans the star until he issues an apology.

== Plot ==
In 1974, Rod Blue is a surfer with shoulder-length hair in Sydney, Australia who also stages rock concerts, unsuccessfully most of the time. Needing a big idea, he decides to fly to Los Angeles, make himself more presentable and try to persuade Frank Sinatra to come to Australia to sing.

Sinatra takes a liking to the kid, overhearing him express why Sinatra's music means so much to him and to everyone. With his lawyer Mickey Rudin and right-hand man Jilly Rizzo in assent that a trip like this would be a good thing at this point for the singer's career, Sinatra agrees to go.

At the airport in Australia, members of the media ask blunt and impolite personal questions as soon as Sinatra and his companion, Barbara Marx, step off their private jet. One of the prying reporters is Hilary Hunter, who angrily claims that Sinatra or someone in his entourage spat on her as they went by.

Rod and his new assistant, Audrey Appleby, who has known him since their youth and long had a crush on him, do their best to make Sinatra's party comfortable in the penthouse of a Sydney hotel. Audrey strikes up a fast friendship with Barbara, who praises Sinatra as a lover but doesn't wish to rush him into marriage.

Before going to Melbourne for the tour's first show, Rod suggests to Sinatra that the Australian press can be very sensitive to criticism, so the singer should try to avoid the subject. Doing it his own way as usual, Sinatra proceeds to further insult the woman reporter from the airport, calling her nothing more than a "two-dollar whore." A restaurant needs to be his way, too, with its chef insulted by Barbara's meddling about how Frank's food needs to be prepared.

Trade unions instantly react. Banding together, they decide to cut off all services to Sinatra immediately, including food, drink and maid service at his hotel. Newspapers mock the singer with headlines like "Frankie, Go Home," but even that is problematic, inasmuch no one is willing now to supply fuel for his jet, either.

An apology is demanded, but the best Sinatra is willing to do is permit Rudin to try to work out a satisfactory compromise with Bob Hawke, the trade union's leader (and Australia's future prime minister). Audrey, meantime, becomes furious at finding Rod kissing reporter Hilary, after which Rod gets into a bloody fistfight with Sinatra's sidekick, Rizzo, who refuses to release tapes of the concert that Rod has already pre-sold.

It is ultimately proposed that Sinatra will do a benefit concert for the trades people, but as soon as he gets back on stage, rather than apologize for calling the reporter a two-dollar hooker, he says: "I overpaid." Enjoying himself nevertheless, the singer calls Barbara up to the stage, introducing her to Australia as "the girl I'm going to marry."

== Cast ==
- Dennis Hopper as Frank Sinatra
  - Tom Burlinson as Frank Sinatra (singing voice)
- Melanie Griffith as Barbara Marx
- Portia de Rossi as Hilary Hunter
- Joel Edgerton as Rod Blue
- Rose Byrne as Audrey Appleby
- David Hemmings as Mickey Rudin
- David Field as Bob Hawke
- Victoria Thaine as Penny
- Stephen O'Rourke as Jilly Rizzo
- Nicholas Hope as Phil
- George Vidalis as Vinny
- Peter Demlakian as Ruby
- Tony Barry as Ralph Blue
- Vincent Ball as Rex Hooper
- Jennifer Hagan as Doris
- Nicholas Papademetriou as Luigi

== Production ==
The film was loosely based on true events. Barbara Marx had been divorced from Zeppo Marx in 1973, a year before the Frank Sinatra concert appearance in Australia depicted in this film. She and Sinatra got married in 1976 and remained together for the rest of his life.

Jilly Rizzo, a restaurateur who became close friend and associate of Sinatra, was killed on his 75th birthday by a drunk driver in 1992. Milton A. "Mickey" Rudin was the singer's attorney; he died of pneumonia in December 1999, a year and a half after Sinatra's death from natural causes.

The labor leader portrayed in the film, Bob Hawke, became prime minister of Australia from 1983 to 1991.

Sinatra's hotel in 1974 was the Boulevard in Sydney, where his suite and those of his entourage were on the 23rd floor. His tour, his first in Australia in 15 years and billed as "Ol' Blue Eyes Is Back," was scheduled to include two shows in Melbourne, followed by three in Sydney. In his first show, according to news reports from 1974, Sinatra referred on stage to the media as "parasites" and "bums" and to women specifically as "the broads of the press, the hookers of the press," then adding, "I might offer them a buck and a half, I'm not sure."

The character of Rod Blue in the film is fictional, as is the love story involving his assistant. Robert Raymond was the 1974 tour's promoter.

The Night We Called It a Day was the first song Frank Sinatra recorded in 1942. The film's title was changed in North America to All the Way, a song Sinatra recorded in 1957.

Sinatra's singing voice for this film was provided by the Australian actor Tom Burlinson, who previously had recreated the vocals for a 1992 American television miniseries called Sinatra produced by the singer's daughter, Tina Sinatra.

== Box office ==
The Night We Called It a Day grossed $502,561 at the box office in Australia.

== See also ==
- Cinema of Australia
