= Envy (1999 film) =

Australian film

- Directed by: Julie Money
- Written by: Jeff Truman, Trevor Shearston
- Produced by: Michael Cook
- Starring: Linda Cropper; Anna Lise Phillips; Wade Osbourne
- Cinematography: Graeme Wood
- Edited by: Roberta Horslie
- Music by: Andy Evans
- Release date: 1999
- Running time: 83 min
- Country: Australia
- Language: English

Envy is a 1999 Australian film directed by Julie Money starring Linda Cropper, Anna Lise Phillips and Wade Osbourne.

== Plot ==
After reclaiming her stolen dress, Kate and her family are targeted by the thief and her friends.

== Cast ==
- Linda Cropper - Kate
- Anna Lise Phillips - Rachel
- Jeff Truman - Phil
- Scott Major - Nick
- Wade Osbourne - Matt
- Abi Tucker - Lissa

== Reception ==
Jane Freebury of The Canberra Times gave it a positive review stating "From the moment it began to the freeze frame of the feral threesome fooling around on a playground roundabout, director Julie Money and writer Jeff Truman had me by the throat." Writing in the Sydney Morning Herald, Sandra Hall commented "It's terse and it's clever, and its uncompromisingly acid take on human weakness makes you eager to see what Money a first-time feature film-maker might do with more money, broader horizons, and a house she can call her own at the end of a day's shoot." The Age's Philippa Hawker concludes "As a psychological thriller, Envy delivers some neat and surprising twists on the familiar story of the supposedly safe, "normal" family disrupted by something dark and threatening from outside." Leigh Paatsch of the Herald Sun gave it 3 1/2 stars saying "Envy, shot in Sydney in 1999 on a minuscule budget with a little-known cast, transcends these two significant obstacles and more to become one of the better local films of the year." Emanuel Levy wrote in Variety that "Despite its shortcomings, "Envy" should serve as a calling card for Money, a director who seems fearless of tackling controversial issues head-on."

== Awards ==
- 2002 Australian Film Institute Awards
  - Best Actress in a Supporting Role - Anna Lise Phillips - nominated
