= City Loop (film) =

- Directed by: Belinda Chayko
- Written by: Stephen Davis
- Produced by: Dr Bruce Redman
- Starring: Jessica Napier; Sullivan Stapleton; Ryan Johnson; Brendan Cowell; Hayley McElhinney
- Cinematography: Josef Damien
- Edited by: Nick Meyers
- Music by: B(if)tek
- Production company: Red Movies
- Distributed by: Dendy Films / Beyond Films
- Release date: 2000
- Running time: 87 minutes
- Country: Australia
- Language: English
- Budget: $A 1.1 million

City Loop is a 2000 Australian film shot in Brisbane. Locations include Southbank, West End, and Boondall.

The film was produced by Dr Bruce Redman for the Queensland-based production company Red Movies.

It was originally known as Bored Olives.

== Plot ==
The plot follows the lives of several characters over a few hours on the same night, centering on a pizza delivery place called Speedy's. The stories are:

- A chef named Dom has a breakdown.
- Misha, a delivery driver, bets he can have sex with his last pizza delivery customer, Sophie.
- Erin, another delivery driver, is in love with her best friend, Robert.
- The boss, Katie, is having an affair with a co-worker, Dom.
- An occasional employee called Stacey has a wild night.

== Cast ==
- Sullivan Stapleton as Dom
- Ryan Johnson as Misha
- Jessica Napier as Sophie
- Brendan Cowell as Robert
- Kellie Jones as Erin
- Hayley McElhinney as Katie
- Megan Dorman as Stacey
- John Batchelor as Mr Maxwell
- Jason Gann as Boy Hoon
- Sam Atwell as Security

== Production ==
The film was one of five movies produced by the AFC in association with SBS Independent as part of its "Million Dollar Movie Accord" initiative. The others were Fresh Air), A Wreck A Tangle, Mallboy and La Spagnola.

The film was shot on super 16mm, and then blown up to 35mm for a limited theatrical release by Dendy Films.

== Release ==
The film premiered at the Asian Film Festival in Tokyo and was selected for screening at the Toronto International Film Festival in 2000.

David Stratton in Variety called the film "a visually strong and well-handled pic about a bunch of unattractive and mostly uninteresting young people. Low-budgeter shows strong directorial talent largely wasted on thin material that's unnecessarily full of tricks."
