= Mushroom Pictures =

Australian film production and distribution company

Mushroom Pictures is an Australian film production and distribution company that is part of the Mushroom Records group.

It was formed in 1993 in association with Regular Records to produce music-related documentaries. In 1995 they announced they would enter feature film production.

Its chief executive from 1994 to 2009 was Martin Fabinyi.

== Select credits ==
- Tribal Voice (1994) (documentary on Yothu Yindi
- Kate Ceberano and Friends (1994) (TV series) – consultant
- The Singer and the Swinger (1999) (documentary)
- Chopper (2000) – production company
- Cut (2000) – distributor
- Russian Doll (2001) – distributor
- Horseplay (2003) – production company
- Gettin' Square (2003) – production company
- Wolf Creek (2005) – distributor
- Macbeth (2006) – production company
- Great Australian Albums Season 1 (2007) (documentary)
- Cannot Buy My Soul (2008) (documentary)
- Great Australian Albums Season 2 (2008) (documentary)
- Cedar Boys (2009) – distributor
- Anvil! The Story of Anvil (2009) (documentary) – distributor
- Addiction (2010) (documentary)
- Such Is Life: The Troubled Times of Ben Cousins (2010) (documentary)
- Mad Bastards (2011) – distributor
- Head First Series 1 (2013) (documentary) – production company
- The Road to Freedom Peak (2013) (documentary) – production company
- Sound City (2013) (documentary) – Australian distributor
- The Last Time I Saw Richard (2014) (short) – production company
- Head First Series 2 (2014) (documentary) – production company
- Molly (2016) (television miniseries) – production company
- Molly: The Real Thing (2016) (television documentary) – production company
- Boys in the Trees (2016) – production company
- Killing Ground (2015) – distributor
