= Celia Ireland =

Australian actress (born 1966)

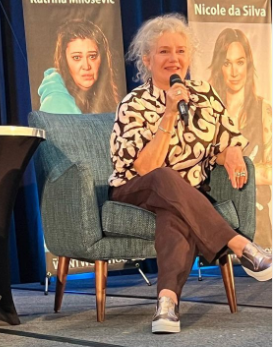
- Born: 16 May 1966 (age 60); Newcastle, New South Wales, Australia
- Occupation: Actress
- Years active: 1992–present
- Notable work: Television: All Saints; Wentworth; Film: My Mother Frank; Australian Rules
- Spouse: Tim
- Children: 2

Celia Ireland (born 16 May 1966) is an Australian actress. She is best known for her role as Regina Butcher on the television series All Saints and her Logie award winning role as Liz Birdsworth on the prison drama series Wentworth.

== Early life ==
Celia Ireland was born in Newcastle, New South Wales on 16 May 1966. She lived in Haig Street, Belmont, City of Lake Macquarie, New South Wales, Australia with a large cast of older sisters and a brother. Celia attended Saint Joseph's Primary School, Belmont, Saint Mary's Catholic High School, Gateshead, City of Lake Macquarie, New South Wales and later Saint Anne's/Saint Pius X College, Adamstown (Newcastle), New South Wales, Australia. Currently, she often visits Canberra, ACT and enjoys shopping and eating out.

== Personal life ==
Ireland has two children, one is an actress. During her acting hiatus, Ireland took up writing.

== Career ==
Ireland made her television debut in 1992 when she made a guest appearance on the Australian television series Police Rescue. What followed was a number of guesting roles on television series such as A Country Practice, Water Rats and Murder Call, to name but a few and the feature films Dallas Dolls in 1994, which was her film debut; Dad and Dave: On Our Selection, Floating Life, Idiot Box and Thank God He Met Lizzie, with Cate Blanchett; all of which she appeared in throughout the nineties.

In 1997, Ireland played Rosy's mother Filameena in the Australian children's television series Swinging for ABC TV.

In 1998, Ireland went on to voice Boronia in the Australian children's animated television series Petals for ABC TV and Mrs. Simms in the Australian children's animated television series Seaside Hotel for Seven Network and Yoram Gross EM TV in 2003.

In 1999, Ireland was cast as Regina Butcher on the Seven Network drama series All Saints, first appearing during the series' second season. She left the series in 2005 during season eight after the character of Regina was written out.

While appearing on All Saints, Ireland continued to receive guest roles in several series and films; the Australian feature films After the Rain, My Mother Frank, Angst and Australian Rules, in which she received a Film Critics Circle of Australia Award for Best Supporting Actress and was nominated for an Australian Film Institute Award for Best Actress in a Supporting Role; the popular Nine Network drama series McLeod's Daughters and Don't Blame Me. In 2006, Ireland played a recurring role in the second season of Supernova. Her other television credits include Monster House, Laid, Me and My Monsters, the television comedy-drama series Packed to the Rafters, and a recurring role as Connie Callahan in the Seven Network soap opera Home and Away; the films Rogue, Cactus, Being Venice and Goddess.

In 2012, it was announced that Ireland had received the regular role of Liz Birdsworth on Australian prison drama series Wentworth, a reimagining of the cult classic series Prisoner (Prisoner: Cell Block H) which aired on Network Ten from 1979 to 1986. Wentworth went to air on SoHo in mid-2013. Ireland had appeared as a regular in all three seasons, as a prisoner who gives peer support to her fellow inmates. Her character name is that of the original Prisoner character Lizzie Birdsworth, although Ireland plays a completely different character role to that of Sheila Florance's character, they do however share a similarity as Liz is a functioning alcoholic, Liz in season six of Wentworth would be diagnosed with dementia.

Ireland would later exit the series in season 7 alongside costar Tammy Macintosh, Liz would pass away after suffering a stroke after the devastating Siege of Wentworth. Ireland and Milosevic who were filming that scene at the time were not told that a costume sale that was being organized was suddenly cancelled as the show had secured funding for its final 20 episodes.

=== Post Wentworth ===
After leaving Wentworth, Ireland had joined the filming of both the first seasons of Five Bedrooms and Total Control.

In 2022, Ireland joined several members of the Wentworth cast at the Wentworth Con fan convention that was held in Melbourne. Ireland also appeared at Wentworth Con Florida.

In 2022, it was announced that Ireland would join the Sydney Theatre Company production of Hubris and Humiliation for its 2023 season.

In 2024, after a multi year absence from television, Ireland was announced as part of the cast for Death in Paradise spin off series Return to Paradise. Ireland played police volunteer Reggie Rocco in the ABC series. Ireland would return for series two of the series when it was announced on 17 April 2025 that it had gone back into production.

== Filmography ==
=== Films ===
Year	Title	Role	Notes
1994	Dallas Doll	Policewoman	Feature film
1995	Dad and Dave: On Our Selection	Sarah	Feature film
1996	Floating Life		Feature film
1996	Idiot Box	Barmaid	Feature film
1997	Thank God He Met Lizzie	Cheryl	Feature film
1999	Oops!	Woman	Short film
2000	After the Rain	Stevie Canetti	
2000	My Mother Frank	Peggy	Feature film
2000	Angst	Case Worker	Feature film
2002	Australian Rules	Liz Black	Feature film
2007	Rogue	Gwen	Feature film
2008	Cactus	Vesna	Feature film
2012	Being Venice	Australian Woman	
2013	Goddess	Mary	Feature film

=== Television ===
Year	Title	Role	Notes	Ref
1992	Police Rescue	Lachlan's Mother	Season 2 (Episode: "Sugar")	
1993	The Comedy Sale	Various	Season 1 (3 episodes)	
1993	A Country Practice	Judy Hallem	Season 13 (2 episodes)	
1996	Water Rats	Sarah Fleetwood	Season 1 (2 episodes)	
1997	Swinging	Filameena Turvey	Season 1 (15 episodes)	
1998	Petals	Boronia (voice)	Seasons 1 & 2	
1999	Murder Call	Barb Ferris	Season 3 (Episode: "Hide & Seek")	
1999	Dog's Head Bay	Alice Astassio	Season 1 (4 episodes)	
2002	Home and Away	Bernadette	Season 15; Unknown episodes	
2002	McLeod's Daughters	Melanie Powers	Season 2 (Episode: "The Bore War")	
2002	Don't Blame Me (aka Don't Blame the Koalas)	Schoolteacher	Season 1 (Episode: "Fate Steps In")	
1999–2005	All Saints	Regina Butcher	Seasons 2–8 (144 episodes)	
2003	Seaside Hotel	Mrs. Simms (voice)	Seasons 1 & 2	
2006	Supernova	Shirl	Season 2 (5 episodes)	
2008	Monster House	Karen Webb	Season 1 (2 episodes)	
2011	Laid	Brendan's Mum	Season 1 (1 episode)	
2011	Me and My Monsters	Pauline Travis	Season 2 (Episode: "The Monster-Sitter")	
2013–14	Home and Away	Connie Callahan	Seasons 26–27 (9 episodes)	
2013	Packed to the Rafters	Colleen Bourke	Season 5 (2 episodes)	
2013–2019	Wentworth	Liz Birdsworth	Seasons 1–7 (80 episodes)	
2013	Redfern Now	Nurse Edwards	Season 2 (Episode: "Where the Heart Is")	
2014	Rake	Cop 1	Season 3 (1 episode)	
2019	Five Bedrooms	Rhonda Hibbert	Season 1 (2 episodes)	
2019	Total Control	Tracy	Season 1 (6 episodes)	
2024-present	Return to Paradise	Reggie Rocco	TV series: 18 episodes	

=== Other appearances ===
Year	Title	Role	Notes	Ref
2020	Wentworth; Behind the Bars 2	Self	Narrator TV Special	
2021	Wentworth Reunion Event	Self	Special	
2019	Wentworth: Behind The Bars	Self	TV Special	
2017	Screen: Celia Ireland	Self	1 episode	
2017	Wentworth: Interrogation Room	Self	Q and A Video	
2016	Thinkergirls Pod	Self	Podcast 1 episode	
2016	An Audience with the Cast of Wentworth (TV series)	Self	TV Special	

== Awards and nominations ==
Year	Award	Category	Work	Result	Ref.
2002	AFI Awards	Best Actress in a Supporting Role	Australian Rules	Nominated	(Note: The AFI Awards (now the AACTA Awards) are presented by the Australian Film Institute.)
2002	FCCA Awards	Best Actress – Supporting Role	Australian Rules	Won	(Note: The FCCA Awards are presented by the Film Critics Circle of Australia.)
2015	ASTRA Awards	Most Outstanding Performance by a Female Actor	Wentworth	Nominated	(Note: Nominated for Season 2 of Wentworth.)
2016	Logie Awards	Most Outstanding Supporting Actress	Wentworth	Won	(Note: Won for Season 3 of Wentworth.)
2018	AACTA Awards	Best Guest or Supporting Actress in a Television Drama	Wentworth	Nominated	(Note: Nominated for Season 6 of Wentworth.)
2018	Logie Awards	Most Outstanding Supporting Actress	Wentworth	Nominated	(Note: Nominated for Season 5 of Wentworth.)
2019	Logie Awards	Most Outstanding Supporting Actress	Wentworth	Nominated	(Note: Nominated for Season 6 of Wentworth.)
