= My Mother Frank =

2000 Australian film

- Film oster
- Directed by: Mark Lamprell
- Written by: Mark Lamprell
- Produced by: Phaedon Vass; Susan Vass; John Winter
- Starring: Sam Neill; Sinéad Cusack; Celia Ireland; Rose Byrne; Matthew Newton
- Cinematography: Brian J. Breheny
- Edited by: Nicholas Beauman
- Music by: Peter Best
- Distributed by: Beyond Films
- Release dates: 19 February 2000 (Berlin); 17 August 2000 (Australia)
- Running time: 95 minutes
- Country: Australia
- Language: English
- Box office: A$311,324 (Australia)

My Mother Frank is a 2000 Australian film.

== Plot ==
David Kennedy (Matthew Newton) is preparing to go to university. His mother, Frank (Sinéad Cusack) is a widow and has very little social life. David tells her that she should get out more and much to his surprise, Frank enrolls at the same university. Frank falls for her poetry tutor (Sam Neill), who hates mature students. David falls for his best friend's girlfriend (Rose Byrne), who isn't interested in the least.

== Cast ==
- Matthew Newton as David Kennedy
- Sinéad Cusack as Frank
- Sam Neill as Professor Mortlock
- Rose Byrne as Jenny
- Celia Ireland as Peggy
- Annie Byron as Eunice
- Nicholas Bishop as Mick
- Deborah Kennedy as Receptionist

== Awards ==
- Nominated for Best Original Screenplay by the Australian Film Institute (Mark Lamprell)
- Nominated for Best Performance by an Actor in a Supporting Role by the Australian Film Institute (Sam Neill)
- Won ASSG Soundtrack of the Year from the Australian Screen Sound Guild (multiple nominees)
- Won Best Achievement in Sound for Dialogue & ADR Editing for a Feature Film from the Australian Screen Sound Guild (multiple nominees)
- Won Best Achievement in Sound for Foley for a Feature Film from the Australian Screen Sound Guild (multiple nominees)
- Won Most Popular Feature Film at the Melbourne International Film Festival (Mark Lamprell)
- Won Viewers' Choice Award for Best Foreign Film at the Temecula Valley International Film Festival (Mark Lamprell)
