= Angst (2000 film) =

- Theatrical release poster
- Directed by: Daniel Nettheim
- Written by: Anthony O'Connor
- Produced by: Jonathon Green
- Starring: Sam Lewis; Jessica Napier; Justin Smith; Abi Tucker
- Cinematography: Tristan Milani
- Edited by: Martin Connor
- Music by: David Thrussell
- Distributed by: United International Pictures
- Release date: 31 August 2000
- Running time: 86 minutes
- Country: Australia
- Language: English
- Box office: A $58,850 (Australia)

Angst is a 2000 black comedy directed by Daniel Nettheim and starring Sam Lewis, Jessica Napier, Justin Smith and Abi Tucker. It was written by Anthony O'Connor. It was shot in and around Sydney, Australia. The film was released in Australian theatres on 31 August 2000. It was released on DVD and digital on 3 December 2025.

== Plot ==
Angst tells the story of a group of horror film devotees living in Sydney's King's Cross. There is Dean (Sam Lewis), a cynical, sexually frustrated video store employee with a bad case of unresolved love. Then there are his flatmates Ian (Justin Smith) and Jade (Jessica Napier) - Ian works in an adult bookstore, waiting for his break as a stand-up comedian, whereas Jade does not work at all, content to smoke pot and watch videos while she can still get away with it. Wandering into the characters' lives is street kid Mole (Luke Lennox), who challenges Jade's lifestyle by stealing the trio's trusty VCR, and the alluring May (Abi Tucker), a goth chick on whom Dean develops an over-the-counter crush.

== Cast ==
- Sam Lewis as Dean
- Jessica Napier as Jade
- Justin Smith as Ian
- Abi Tucker as May
- Luke Lennox as Mole
- Lara Cox as Heather
- Emmanuel Marshall as Simon
- Johnathan Devoy as Logan
- Paul Zebrowski as Steve
- Celia Ireland as Case Worker
- Joel McIlroy as Chook

== Reception ==
ABC's Julie Rigg described the production as a "sweetly enjoyable film which almost works". David Stratton gave the film four out of five stars.

Writer Anthony O’Connor claims that after its VHS rental release the movie was frequently stolen from video rental shops, where the film did well.

=== Box office ===
Angst took $58,850 at the box office in Australia, which is equivalent to $117,445 in 2025 dollars.

== Awards ==
- 2000 - Won Australian Screen Sound Guild for Best Achievement in Sound for Sound Effects Editing for a Feature Film
- 2000 - Won IF Awards for Best Music
- 2000 - Nominated IF Awards for Best Sound Design
