= Justin Smith (actor) =

Australian actor

- Born: Australia
- Occupation: Actor
- Years active: 1990–present

Justin Smith is an Australian actor, best known for his AFI nominated performance as barrister Josh Bornstein in the ABC mini-series Bastard Boys. He is also known in Australia for his TV, film, theatre and television commercial work.

== Career ==
Smith's first professional role was at the age of 16 in the Australian tour of Jesus Christ Superstar starring John Farnham.

Smith played the role of Mark in the original Australian production of RENT, which garnered him a 1999 Green Room nomination for Best Actor in a musical, and starred in the movie Angst. Smith has also appeared in The Cherry Orchard and Ruby Moon for the Sydney Theatre Company and the productions, Shakespeare's R & J, Servant of Two Masters, and Just Macbeth (at the Sydney Opera House and Edinburgh Fringe Festival seasons), for the Bell Shakespeare Co. Aust.

In 2007 Smith was nominated for an AFI award for his role in Bastard Boys. In 2008, Smith played the role of Tony (Billy's older brother) in Billy Elliot the Musical, for which he was nominated for Best Actor in a Musical at the Sydney Theatre Awards 2008. In 2009, he was in The Sydney Theatre Company's successful production of Anthony Neilson's play, The Wonderful World of Dissocia.

In 2011, Smith appeared in Julia Leigh's Sleeping Beauty (official selection Cannes Film Festival); Jonathan Teplitzky's Burning Man; and the Fred Schepisi directed The Eye of the Storm. In 2012 Smith appeared as Muzz in Underbelly: Badness and, David Hill in Howzat! Kerry Packer's War. He toured Australia throughout 2012 and 2013 as Detective Sergeant Trotter in the first professional Australian production of Agatha Christie's The Mousetrap.

In 2013, Smith performed in the Griffin Theatre Company's September 2013 production of John Romeril's "The Floating World" for which he won a Glugg Award for best supporting actor, and in early January 2014 in The Winter's Tale for Bell Shakespeare. He appeared in the Foxtel mini-series Devil's Playground in 2014, Deadline Gallipoli in 2015 and Secret City in 2016.

In 2024, Smith appeared in the ABC series Return to Paradise.

== Personal ==
Smith is married to Australian actress Sophie Gregg, and they have two children.

Smith's brother, Michael Howard Smith, made his London West End debut in the 2006 production of Andrew Lloyd Webber's Whistle Down the Wind in the role of Boon. He also appeared at Edinburgh Festival in Seriously: Pet Shop Boys Reinterpreted.

== Filmography ==
=== Television appearances ===
Year	Title	Role	Notes	Ref
1994	Home and Away	Porno Freak No. 1	TV series, 1 episode	
1999	Stingers	Lawrence Fisher	TV series, 1 episode	
1999	Queen Kat, Carmel & St Jude	Anton	TV mini-series, 3 episodes	
2001	South Pacific	Forklift Operator	(TV movie)	
2003	White Collar Blue	Wayne Dobson	TV series, 1 episode	
2007	Bastard Boys	Josh Bornstein	TV mini-series, 1 episode	
2009	My Place	Joe Blake	TV series, 1 episode	
2011	Spirited	Mitchell	TV series, 1 episode	
2012	Underbelly	Muzz	TV series, 2 episodes	
2012	Howzat! Kerry Packer's War	David Hill	TV mini-series, 2 episodes	
2012	Tricky Business	Colin Hendricks	TV series, 1 episode	
2012	Monday Bites		TV series, 1 episode	
2012	The Straits	Puffs	TV series, 3 episodes	
2014	Devil's Playground	Detective Blacket	TV mini-series, 2 episodes	
2014	Corn Cobs	Patrick	TV series, 1 episode	
2014	The Moodys	Bratty Kid's Dad	TV mini-series, 1 episode	
2015	Deadline Gallipoli	Lester Lawrence	TV mini-series, 2 episodes	
2016	Home and Away	Aaron Walsh	TV series, 4 episodes	
2016–2019	Secret City	William Vaughn	TV series, 12 episodes	
2017	The Other Guy	Damon	TV series, 1 episode	
2017	Blue Murder: Killer Cop	Glen McNamara	TV mini-series, 2 episodes	
2019	The Letdown	Angus	1 episode	
2020-21	Fear the Walking Dead	Marcus	5 episodes	
2021	Wentworth	Alex Maher	2 episodes	
2022	Heartbreak High	Jim	3 episodes	
2023	The Messenger	Hal Kanie	8 episodes	
2021-23	RFDS	Archie	2 episodes	
2023	The Artful Dodger	Tinkler Duckett	3 episodes	
2023	Strife	Panel Host	1 episode	
2024	Return to Paradise	Mal Haddon	1 episode	
2024	Last Days of the Space Age	George	2 episodes	
2024	The Newsreader	Dr Gibbs	TV series, 1 episode	
2025	The Narrow Road to the Deep North	Steve Hirst	2 episodes	
2025	The Last Anniversary	Mr. Finch	3 episodes	
2026	Shakedown	Scott Morrison	TV series	

=== Film appearances ===
Year	Title	Role	Notes
1990	Daddy's Dyin': Who's Got the Will?	Little Orville	
2000	Angst	Ian	
2002	The Number	Jimmy	(Short)
2005	The Mechanicals	Water Man	(Short)
2005	Tan Lines	Narrator	
2006	Glitch	Dave	(Short)
2007	Snookered		(Short)
2007	Australian Tails	Jet (voice)	(Short)
2007	Kindle	Kerry	(Short)
2010	Mama Always Told Him...	George	(Short)
2011	The Eye of the Storm	Club Desk Clerk	
2011	Sleeping Beauty	Hallelujah Businessman	
2011	Bars and Tone	Wes	(Short)
2011	Burning Man	Dr. Allen	
2012	Chop Suey	Fan 2	(Short)
2013	Around the Block	Chris	
2014	Tammy	Paramedic	
2016	Frog	Man	(Short)
2017	Pirates of the Caribbean: Salazar's Revenge	Mr. Krill	
2019	Babyteeth	Drunk Crooner	
2022	Carmen	Phil	
