= Jessica Napier =

Australian actress

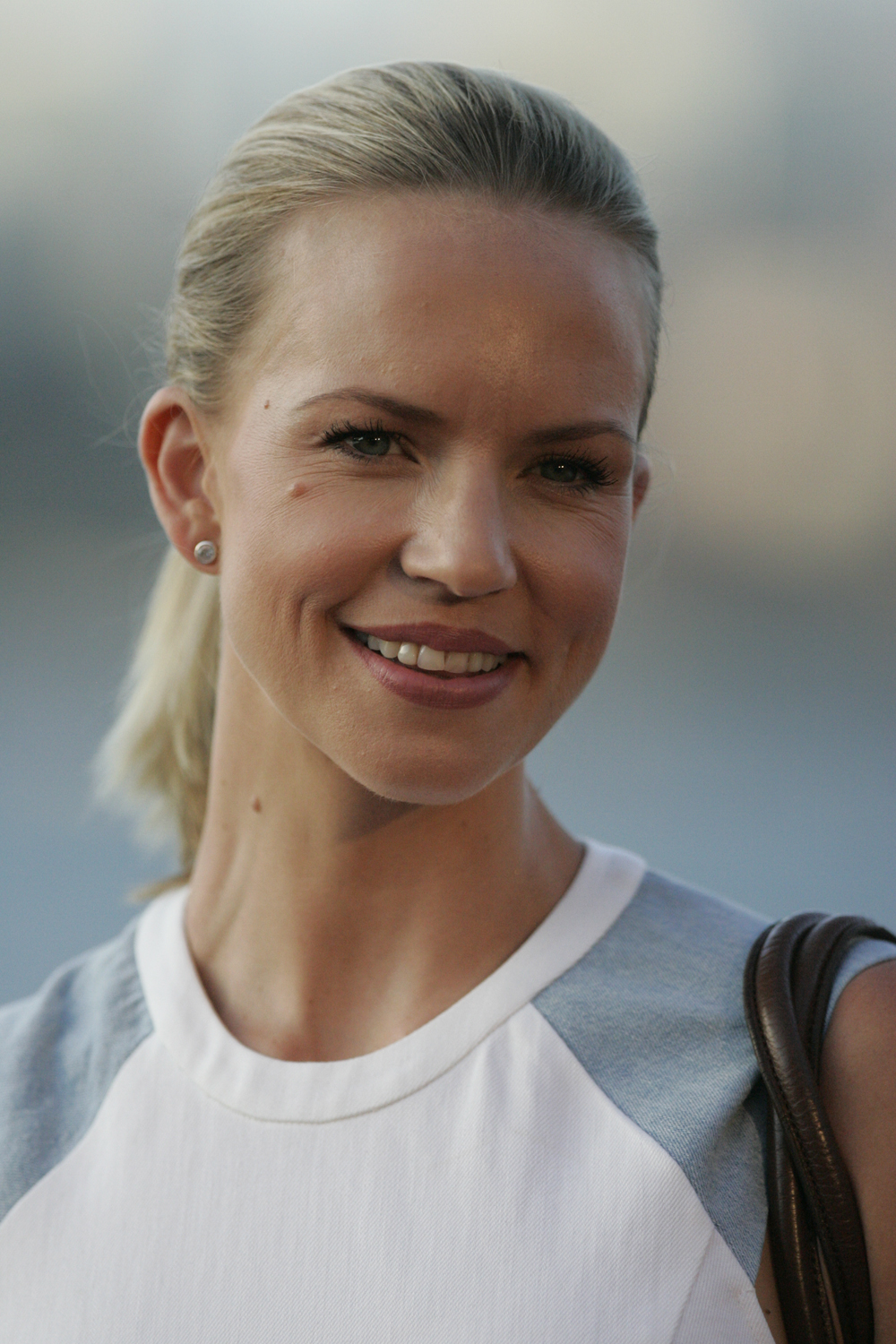
- Napier in 2013
- Born: April 4, 1979 (age 47); Wellington, New Zealand
- Occupation: Actress
- Years active: 1993–present
- Spouse: David Adler (m. 2009)
- Children: 2
- Father: Marshall Napier
- Relatives: James Napier Robertson (cousin)

Jessica Napier is a New Zealand-born actress based in Australia. She has appeared in a number of feature films, including Love Serenade, Blackrock, Cut, City Loop, Angst, The Illustrated Family Doctor and Ghost Rider, and is well known for her role of Becky Howard in the Australian TV drama series McLeod's Daughters.

== Early life ==
Napier was born in Wellington, New Zealand. Her father, actor Marshall Napier, relocated the family to Australia when she was a child.

== Career ==
Napier had her first acting role at age 9, when she played her father's daughter on the long-running Australian TV series Police Rescue. A year later she reappeared in another episode, when her father nominated her to fill in for a role when the girl who was booked for the job refused as the character was required to be submerged in a swamp.

It was not until Napier was 15 that she decided to be an actress. On her first serious audition she won the lead role of Edwina on Echo Point. Her first feature film was in Shirley Barrett's award-winning Love Serenade (with Miranda Otto), followed by the critically acclaimed Blackrock, where her character's brother was played by Heath Ledger in his first prominent film role.

Small parts in a string of other popular Australian TV shows, including Water Rats and Murder Call, followed; she played the role of Gerry Davis in the highly acclaimed Wildside, alongside Aaron Pedersen, Rachel Blake and Tony Martin.

Napier then appeared in Stingers (with Peter Phelps) and City Loop before landing the lead role of Raffy in Mushroom Pictures' film Cut. The cult Australian slasher film was her first lead in a feature. The cast included Molly Ringwald, Kylie Minogue and Stephen Curry.

She then starred in Angst and appeared in the made-for-TV film Child Star: The Shirley Temple Story.

Already a household name in Australia, Napier then played Becky Howard on the Australian TV drama McLeod's Daughters from 2000 to 2003. Her father played Harry Ryan on the same series.

She then starred in the tele-movie The Alice. Following its success it went on as a series with Napier reprising her role in the tele-drama.

In 2009, Napier guest starred in both the popular third season of TV series Sea Patrol and the new Rescue: Special Ops.

The thriller Savages Crossing was released in 2010 and saw Napier star in an ensemble cast of other Australian favourites including John Jarratt, Craig McLachlan, Sacha Horler and Chris Haywood.

In 2010 the Nine Network announced that they would be continuing with their successful Underbelly franchise by producing three separate stand-alone crime telemovies which would be known as The Underbelly Files. Napier was cast as the lead actress in the second of these telemovies, titled Underbelly Files: Infiltration, opposite Sullivan Stapleton. Infiltration follows Victorian police officer Colin McClaren's investigation into the local Calabrian mafia in which he infiltrates their group. It also stars Valentino del Toro, Henry Nixon, Tottie Goldsmith, Buddy Dannoun and Glenda Linscott. In 2021 Napier appeared in a small role in Moon Rock For Monday, an AACTA-nominated feature film directed by Kurt Martin.

== Personal life ==
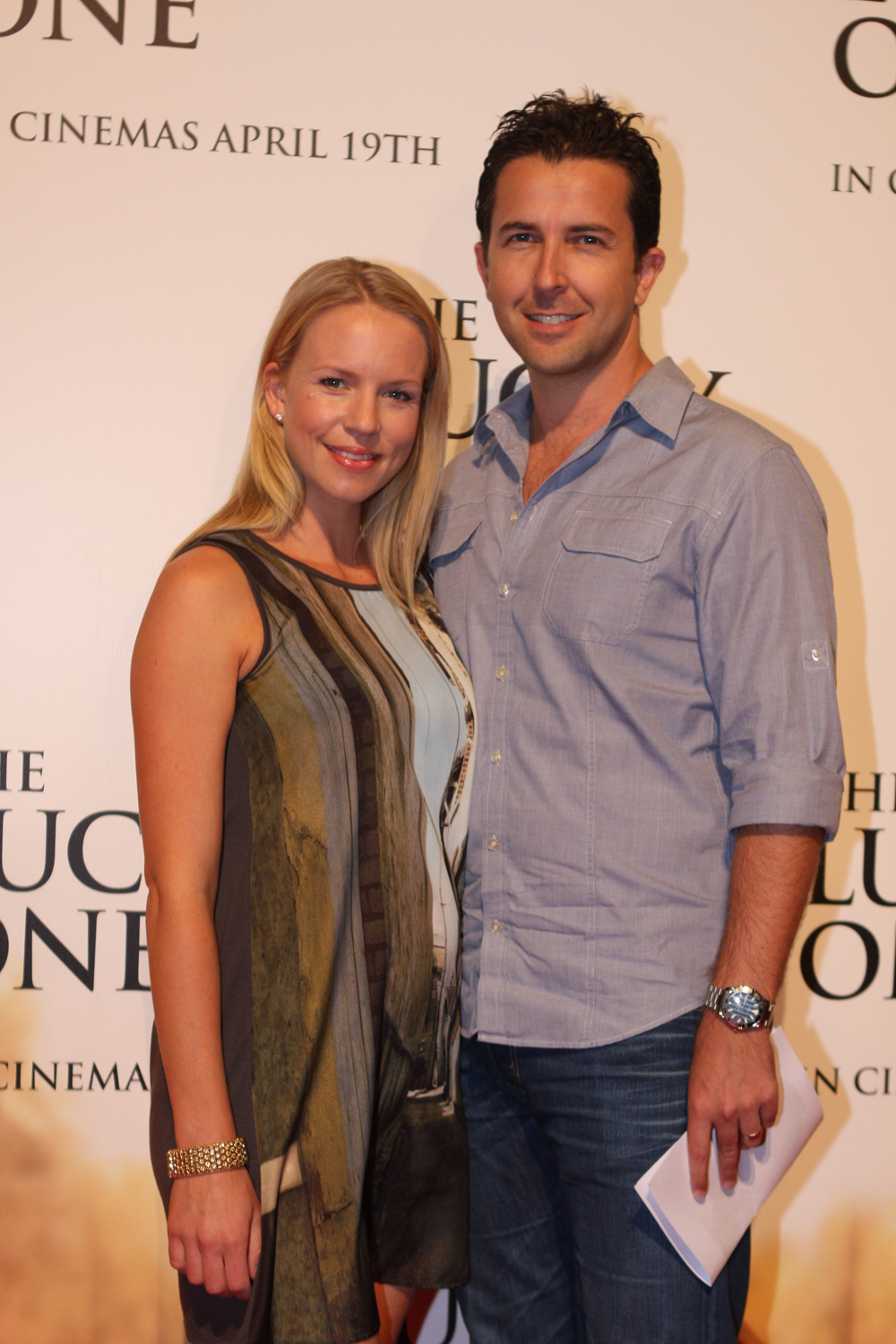
Napier and her husband, David Adler, at the premiere of The Lucky One in 2012

Napier married David Adler on 28 November 2009. They live in Sydney together with their children Emily and Oliver.

Napier is a vegetarian, and supports various animal rights foundations. She has also supported the use of Taronga Zoo in Sydney for retired circus elephants.

== Filmography ==
=== Film ===
Year	Title	Role	Notes
1996	Love Serenade	Deborah 'Debbie'	Feature film
1997	Blackrock	Rachel Ackland	Feature film
1998	War Story	Princess	Short film
2000	Cut	Raffy Caruthers	Feature film
2000	City Loop (aka Bored Olives)	Sophie	Feature film
2000	Twitch	Jane	Short film
2000	Angst	Jade	Feature film
2001	Jet Set	Louise	
2002	New Skin	Lyra	
2002	Stuffed Bunny	German Girlfriend	Short film
2002	Sweet Dreams		Short film
2004	Post	Jessica	Short film
2005	The Illustrated Family Doctor	Christine	Feature film
2006	Safety in Numbers	Jen	Feature film
2007	Ghost Rider	Broken Spoke Waitress	Feature film
2007	Don't Panic	Kimberly	Short film
2011	Savages Crossing	Kate	Feature film
2012	The Letter	Sophia	Short film
2020	Moon Rock For Monday	Nurse Roz	Feature film
2023	Transfusion	Doctor Williams	Feature film
TBA	Day of Carnage	Jane	Post-production

=== Television ===
Year	Title	Role	Notes
1991	Police Rescue	Therese / Tracey	TV series, season 1, 2 episodes: "L.P.G.", "One for Dad"
1995	Echo Point	Edwina Amadio	TV series, 130 episodes
1996	Police Rescue	Zoe	TV series, season 5, episode 9: "The Only Constant"
1996	Twisted Tales	Michelle	TV series, season 1, episode 9: "Night of the Monster"
1997	Water Rats	Vanessa	TV series, season 2, episode 25: "The Witness"
1997	Murder Call	Brodie Cochrane	TV series, season 1, episode 5: "Who Killed Cock Robin?"
1997–98	Wildside	Gerry Davis	TV series, 40 episodes
1998	Stingers	Constable Kaye Kelso (Emily Shaw)	TV series, season 1, 5 episodes
2000	The Lost World	Gladys	TV series, season 2, episode 7: "London Calling"
2001	Head Start	Amy	TV miniseries, episode 5: "Making Music"
2001	Child Star: The Shirley Temple Story	Klammie	TV film
2001–03	McLeod's Daughters	Becky Howard	TV series, 70 episodes
2004	The Alice	Jess Daily	TV film
2005–06	The Alice	Jess Daily	TV series, 22 episodes
2007	Chandon Pictures	Annabelle	TV series, season 1, episode 5: "Private Dick"
2007	All Saints	Pam Elton	TV series, season 10, episode 10: "Life's Little Miracles"
2009	All Saints	Elyse Leine	TV series, season 12, episode 23: "Out of Control 2"
2009	Sea Patrol	Simone Robsen	TV series, season 3, 5 episodes
2009	Rescue: Special Ops	Nicole	TV series, season 1, 4 episodes
2010	Cops L.A.C.	Natalie	TV series, season 1, episode 11: "Illegal Dumping"
2011	Underbelly Files: Infiltration	Jude Gleeson / Narrator	TV film
2014	Janet King	Caroline Martin	TV series, season 1, 3 episodes: "A Song of Experience", "Lurking Doubt", "Overtime"
2018	Bite Club	Pia	TV miniseries, 4 episodes
2021	Harrow	Jade Freeman	TV series, season 3, episode 9: "Quam Innocentum Damnari"
2023	C*A*U*G*H*T	Tania Towers	TV series, season 1, episode 5: "The Greatest Show, Man"

== Theatre ==
Year	Title	Role	Notes
2000	Love Letters	Melissa Gardner	NIDA Parade Theatre, Sydney
