= Children of the Dragon =

- Based on: Avenue of Eternal Peace by Nicholas Jose
- Written by: Robert Caswell
- Story by: Robert Caswell, Nick Jose
- Directed by: Peter Smith
- Starring: Bob Peck; Linda Cropper; Gary Sweet; Joan Chen; Jeff Truman; Dennis Chan; Cindy Pan; Cary Wong; Wan Thye Liew />Stephen Middleton
- Theme music composer: Martin Armiger
- Countries of origin: United Kingdom; Australia
- Original language: English
- No. of episodes: 4 x 1 hour

Production
- Producers: John Edwards; Sandra Levy
- Budget: $7.7 million

Original release
- Network: Australian Broadcasting Corporation
- Release: 18 August – 19 August 1992

Children of the Dragon (alternatively titled Sign Of The Snake) is a 1992 BBC-Australian Broadcasting Corporation 4-part TV miniseries set against the background of the 1989 Tiananmen Square protests and massacre. It's based on the novel Avenue of Eternal Peace (the name of a road linking Tiananmen and Tiananmen Square) by Nicholas Jose.

It was shot at the ABC Frenchs Forest Studios and at the Sydney Showground.

== Cast ==
- Bob Peck as Dr Will Flint
- Linda Cropper as Monica
- Gary Sweet as Larry
- Joan Chen as Jin-Juan
- Dennis Chan as Director Kang
- Cindy Pan as Pei
- Cary Wong as Eagle
- Jeff Truman as Theo
- Darren Yap

== Crew ==
- Director: Peter Smith
- Writers: Robert Caswell, Nick Jose
- Producers: John Edwards, Sandra Levy
- Executive Producers: Penny Chapman, Scott Meek, Kim Williams
- Director of Photography: Steve Windon
- Editor: Stuart Armstrong, Chris Spurr
- Production Designer: Murray Picknett

== Music ==
The score by Martin Armiger, orchestrated and conducted by Derek Williams with additional orchestrations by Edward Primrose was recorded at Studios 301, and extensively featured the Erhu, played by Cai-Fu (Carl) Zhang.
