= Luke Lennox =

Australian actor (born 1983)

Luke Lennox (born 28 October 1983) is an Australian actor. He started acting in 1997 on the Australian drama series Blue Heelers as a guest role. He worked on the Australian feature Angst where he played the character Mole, which was shot in and around Sydney. Luke also has worked with theatre companies in Sydney and Melbourne, and was an ensemble member of the independent Melbourne theatre company, PMD Productions.

== Filmography ==
Year	Title	Role	Notes
2022	Five Bedrooms	Buckets	2 episodes
2020	Informer 3838	Prison Inmate	2 episodes
2019	Measure for Measure	Ken	
2017	The Significance of Others	Watto	Short
2015	Something Nautical	Gaz/Caroler/Doug	7 episodes
2013	House Husbands	Armed Robber	1 episode
2012	Poppy	Rick	Short
2011	Relationship Rehab	Glen	Short
2011	Neighbours	Tony Winstone	2 episodes
2011	Offspring (TV series)	Jim	1 episode
2011	Underbelly Files: The Man who got Away	Spec Ops Cop	TV Movie
2009	Rex	Sean	TV Movie
2009	Whatever Happened to that Guy?	Luke Kewley	3 episodes
2007	Kath & Kim	Brodie	1 episode
2005	Da Kath & Kim Code	Brodie	TV Movie
2005	You and Your Stupid Mate	The Prof	
2003	MDA	Tyson	1 episode
1997-03	Blue Heelers	Shane Franklin/Danny Thompson/Jason Smith	7 episodes
2000	Angst	Mole	

Crew
Year	Title	Role	Notes
2015	Something Nautical		sound recordist/still photographer/producer
2015	Many Happy Returns		sound recordist
