= Robert Caswell =

Australian screenwriter

Robert Caswell (13 July 1946 – 29 October 2006) was an Australian screenwriter of films and television. In the 1970s and early 1980s, he was one of the leading writers in Australian television. After the success of Evil Angels, for which he received an Oscar nomination, he moved to Hollywood and became a leading "script doctor".

== Select Credits ==
- Number 96 (1972) (TV series) as "Bob Caswell"
- The Unisexers (1975) (TV series)
- McManus MPB (1976) (TV pilot)
- ABBA: The Movie (1977)
- Glenview High (1977–78) (TV series)
- Chopper Squad (1978–79) (TV series)
- The Body Corporate (1981) (TV movie)
- Jimmy Dancer (1981) (TV)
- Scales of Justice (1983) (mini-series)
- Who Killed Hannah Jane? (1984) (TV movie)
- Singles (1984) (mini-series)
- Bodyline (1984) (mini-series)
- Shout! The Story of Johnny O'Keefe (1985) (mini-series)
- Evil Angels (1988)
- Children of the Dragon (1992) (TV series)
- The Doctor (1991)
- Over the Hill (1992) – also producer
- A Far Off Place (1993)
- Something the Lord Made (2004) (TV movie)
