= AM PM (Endorphin album) =

AM:PM

Studio album by Endorphin
- Released: 15 October 2001
- Genre: Electronica, trip hop
- Label: Sony BMG

Endorphin chronology
Skin (1999)	AM:PM (2001)	Seduction (2003)

AM:PM is the third album by the Australian band Endorphin, released in 2001. It was a two disc album, with the first labeled "AM", and the second labeled "PM". Eric Chapus (Endorphin's only band member) has stated that "AM reflects my life in the studio and PM reflects what I do live."

== Track listing ==
AM

1. "Danger Zone" - 3:15
2. "Sex & Violence" - 3:09
3. "Tease" - 4:01
4. "The Best is Yet to Come" - 4:17
5. "Traffic" - 4:17
6. "Horizon" - 4:21
7. "Can't Hold On" - 3:26
8. "Antipodes" - 3:38
9. "Watching Shadows" - 3:17
10. "My Tomorrow" - 3:57
11. "Lesson 1" - 3:06
12. "Spell" - 5:39

PM

1. "Computer Games" - 3:53
2. "Viva" - 5:44
3. "Satie 3" - 6:04
4. "Pressure" - 4:00
5. "Get The Funk" - 4:19
6. "Fear" - 5:26
7. "Dare" - 4:47
8. "Flight 601" - 3:55
9. "Sex and Violence (Nash T vs. Archie Remix)" - 10:08
