= George Vidalis =

Australian actor

George Vidalis is an Australian actor who has appeared in many television series and films. George is best known for his role as Manolis in the comedy series Acropolis Now.

George has appeared in such television series as Blue Heelers, Underbelly, Stingers, A Country Practice, Big Sky, Prisoner and The Flying Doctors. His film roles include Macbeth, The Night We Called It a Day and The Heartbreak Kid.
