= Cut (2000 film) =

- Film poster
- Directed by: Kimble Rendall
- Written by: Dave Warner
- Produced by: Bill Bennett; Martin Fabinyi; Jennifer Cluff
- Starring: Molly Ringwald; Tiriel Mora; Simon Bossell; Kylie Minogue
- Cinematography: David Foreman
- Edited by: Henry Dangar
- Music by: Guy Gross
- Production companies: Beyond Films; MBP (Germany); Mushroom Pictures
- Distributed by: United International Pictures
- Release date: 23 February 2000
- Running time: 82 minutes
- Country: Australia
- Language: English

Cut is a 2000 Australian slasher film directed by Kimble Rendall and starring Kylie Minogue, Molly Ringwald, Jessica Napier, and Tiriel Mora.

== Plot ==
In 1988, while filming a scene for the slasher movie Hot Blooded where Scarman slits a girl named Chloe in the throat, Scarman's actor Brad (Frank Roberts) accidentally stabs Chloe's actress Vanessa Turnbill (Molly Ringwald) non-fatally in the breasts, causing the movie's director Hilary Jacobs (Kylie Minogue) to yell at him. Later on, Brad, still in his costume, confronts Hilary in her office, who fires him. Enraged, Brad puts on the Scarman mask, cuts off his own pinky finger with his shears and murders Hilary by cutting off her tongue. Vanessa comes in and finds Hilary dead before Brad attacks her, which they both struggle over the shears. Vanessa's personal assistant Lossman (Geoff Revel) comes in just as Vanessa grabs the shears and stabs Brad through the neck, killing him.

12 years later in 2000, Lossman is now a college professor who advises his film students Raffy Carruthers (Jessica Napier), Hester Ryan (Sarah Kants), Damien Ogle (Sam Lewis), Julie Bardot (Cathy Adamek), Rick Stephens (Stephen Curry), Jim Pilonski (Steve Greig), Cassie Woolf (Erika Walters) and Paulie Morrelli (Matt Russell) not to finish the Hot Blooded movie, because anyone who has tried to finish it ended up being mysteriously murdered. Determined to finish the movie despite Lossman's warnings, the group contact Vanessa, now a golf player, through her manager (Paul Blackwell), and she eventually agrees to return to Australia to finish the movie. They get the rights and a copy of the movie from an old woman Martha (Phyllis Burford), and get permission from Mr. Drivett (Edwin Hodgeman), the owner of the mansion where Hot Blooded was originally filmed, to film their movie there. Another friend, Bobby Doog (Simon Bossell), joins the movie to play Scarman.

While watching the copy of the movie at a theatre, the group play a prank on Raffy by tricking her into thinking everyone around her has been killed by the fake "Scarman" who attacks Raffy, which angers her when the prank is revealed. Later that night, the real Scarman shows up at the theatre and disembowels the Archives Projectionist (Tiriel Mora). Two police detectives Hollander (Peter Green) and Lucy Carter (Caroline Minon) investigate the crime scene and link it back to the older murders revolving around Hot Blooded.

While everyone is preparing to film the movie in the mansion, Scarman lurks around and Bobby starts acting strange in the Scarman costume. As Paulie and Cassie sneak off into the kitchen to have sex, Scarman shows up, decapitating Paulie with a cleaver. Cassie throws plates at him and tries to block his swings with a pan, but he cuts her arm, then throws the cleaver at her chest, pinning her against a door.

The next day, Hollander and Carter find the group and question Raffy and Hester over the murder at the theatre. Back at the motel, Raffy worries about Paulie and Cassie and someone who is trying to stop them from finishing the movie, but Hester reassures her. That night, they continue to film their movie and Jim goes to leave in the bus to town to get supplies for the movie, but Scarman is in the back seats. He thinks it is Bobby and tries to kick him off the bus, but Scarman cuts his arm with the shears and slits his throat.

Vanessa is rehearsing her kill scene as the mother in the movie with Raffy, Damien, Julie, and Rick, but Bobby dressed as Scarman suddenly gets too rough with her. Then a fight starts with Rick and Damien when he makes a vulgar joke about him and Raffy, so everyone takes a break. Hester realizes that Cassie and Paulie have been gone too long and goes outside to call the police on her phone, but there is still no signal. Suddenly, Cassie's body falls from the tree into Hester, terrifying her. She gets up and runs into Scarman who tries to grab her, but she slaps him and they both fall over. Hester escapes and is chased into a woodshed, where she tries to fight Scarman with a hacksaw, but he overpowers her, slicing her stomach open with the shears, then decapitates her with an industrial machine that chops up wood.

Lossman confronts Raffy and recognises her as Hilary's daughter, who wants to honour her mother by finishing the movie. Afterwards, they both discover all the tires of their cars and even the bus have been slashed, but they assume it is the locals pulling cruel pranks on them. Bobby is in his changing room and he meets Scarman. He thinks he is Rick, then Scarman stabs him in the stomach with the shears and slits his throat. He hides Bobby's body and pretends to be him when Julie arrives.

Vanessa, Raffy, Damien, Julie, and Rick start filming Vanessa's death scene in the movie, then Scarman pretending to be Bobby with the real shears joins the scene, getting ready to kill her for real. A scared Martha shows up in her car at the mansion and warns Lossman that the movie is evil and it needs to be destroyed to stop Scarman. He runs back inside telling the others, just as Scarman almost kills Vanessa, but she flees in time and everyone runs outside, while Martha runs upstairs to go find the copy of the movies. Damien thinks Scarman is Bobby getting too much into character, so he keeps filming through the camera and is killed when Scarman stabs him through the eye with his shears. Lossman goes back inside to find Martha because she has the keys to the only working car.

Julie and Rick stay in Martha's car, while Vanessa and Raffy go back inside the mansion. Scarman tries to get in the car, but it is locked, so he starts pouring gasoline all over the car. Julie attempts to flee, but she gets gasoline on her when she falls over, then Scarman lights her on fire, burning her to death. Panicking, Rick cannot open the doors in time and is killed when Scarman lights the car on fire, making it explode.

After getting knives from the kitchen, Vanessa and Raffy go upstairs to Drivett's office, where they find him tied upside down and disemboweled. Martha suffers a fatal stroke when she sees his body and Lossman is unable to revive her. Lossman, Vanessa and Raffy find the copies of the movie, but they all accidentally slip down the stairs. Scarman stabs Lossman through the throat with a wooden pole, then Vanessa distracts Scarman making him follow her, while Raffy takes the movies and runs outside. Scarman chases Vanessa upstairs to the room where they both filmed the opening of Hot Blooded. They fight and Scarman starts screaming in pain due to Raffy trying to destroy the movies in the fire, then he knocks out Vanessa just as he notices a police car pulling up outside.

Hollander and Carter arrive at the mansion and find Raffy trying to burn the movies in the flames of the car. They stop her and put her in a police car as she screams about the movie being evil. Hollander goes inside and shoots Scarman many times, but it does not kill him, and Scarman decapitates him with his shears. Carter goes inside to save Hollander, but is attacked by Scarman and runs outside behind the mansion. Scarman throws his shears to her back, making her fall over on an outdoor water faucet, getting impaled on it.

Scarman returns to Vanessa who is now awake and they fight again. She ends up falling out a window, while Raffy gets out of the police car and continues burning the movies. Scarman finds Vanessa still on the ground and starts pouring gasoline on her. As Raffy burns more of the movies, Scarman's face starts melting, so he throws a lit match near Vanessa and she screams as she quickly tries to crawl away from the fire that is spreading towards her. Scarman goes after Raffy and starts swinging the shears at her, cutting her arm. Just as Scarman tries to stab Raffy in the throat, Lossman, who is revealed to be alive, shows up and throws the rest of the movies into the fire. Scarman seemingly dies and melts into a pile of slimy substance next to Raffy. Lossman passes out on the ground as a crying Raffy crawls over to him.

A while later, Lossman and Vanessa are recovering at the hospital. Raffy and Lossman visit Vanessa to inform her that Scarman is really dead, much to her relief.

At another college in New York, a professor (Pamela Shaw) plays another damaged copy of the Hot Blooded movie for her students. As the damaged reel causes the projector to malfunction, Scarman sits behind the professor in the row of seats and slits her in the head.

== Cast ==
- Molly Ringwald as Chloe / Vanessa Turnbill
- Frank Roberts as Brad / Scarman
- Jessica Napier as Raffy Carruthers
- Geoff Revell as Lossman
- Sarah Kants as Hester Ryan
- Sam Lewis as Damien Ogle
- Kylie Minogue as Hilary Jacobs
- Stephen Curry as Rick Stephens
- Cathy Adamek as Julie Bardot
- Simon Bossell as Bobby Doog
- Steve Greig as Jim Pilonski
- Erika Walters as Cassie Woolf
- Matt Russell as Paulie Morrelli
- Phyllis Burford as Martha
- Peter Green as Sen Det Hollander
- Caroline Mignon as Detective Lucy Carter
- Edwin Hodgeman as Mr. Drivett
- Tiriel Mora as Archives Projectionist
- Don Barker as Original Producer
- Scott Heysen as Original Director
- Dominic Pedlar as TV Reporter
- Holly Myers as TV Reporter
- Patrick Frost as TV Reporter
- Bronwyn James as Forensic Supervisor
- Pamela Shaw as Lecturer
- Paul Blackwell as Vanessa's Manager
- Huong Nguyen as Cleaner

== Production ==
The film was shot in South Australia in the Adelaide region.

== Box office ==
Cut grossed $501,979 at the box office in Australia.

Internationally the film was a top 10 box office hit in France and Singapore, and since its release has fully recouped its budget.
