= Sas (surname) =

Sas is a Hungarian surname meaning eagle. Notable people with the surname include:

- Anna Sas (born 2003), Belarusian footballer
- Bert Sas (1892–1948), Netherlands military attaché
- Brunori Sas (born 1977), Italian singer
- Éva Sas (born 1970), French politician
- Ferenc Sas (1915–1988), Hungarian football player
- Igor Sas (fl. from 1982), Australian actor
- József Sas (born 1939–2021), Hungarian actor, comedian and theatre manager
- Kazimir Sas (born 1982), Australian actor
- Marco Sas (born 1971), Dutch footballer
- Norman Sas (1925–2012), American toy inventor, mechanical engineer and manufacturer
