= McLeod's Daughters season 8 =

McLeod's Daughters
- Season 8
- Season 8 DVD
- Starring: Simmone Jade Mackinnon Abi Tucker
- No. of episodes: 22

Release
- Original network: Nine Network
- Original release: 23 July 2008 – 31 January 2009

Season chronology
- ← Previous; Season 7

The eighth and final season of the long-running Australian outback drama McLeod's Daughters began airing on 23 July 2008 and concluded on 31 January 2009 with a total of 22 episodes.

== Plot ==
After years as Australia's favourite television drama, the saga of McLeod's Daughters finally came to a close... but not before financial ruin again threatened Drover's Run. New romances come under pressure, Stevie gives birth, Ingrid disappears under mysterious circumstances and Jaz McLeod makes a surprise return to Drover's Run.

== Cast ==
Cast of Season 8

=== Main ===
- Simmone Jade Mackinnon as Stevie Hall
- Abi Tucker as Grace Kingston
- Matthew Passmore as Marcus Turner
- Gillian Alexy as Tayler Geddes
- Luke Jacobz as Patrick Brewer
- Doris Younane as Moira Doyle
- Edwina Ritchard as Jaz McLeod (15 episodes)
- John Schwarz as Ben Hall (15 episodes)
- Michala Banas as Kate Manfredi (4 episodes)

=== Recurring ===
- Rachael Coopes as Ingrid Marr (21 episodes)
- Peter Hardy as Phil Rakich (20 episodes)
- Gus Murray as Father Dan (16 episodes)
- Martin Lynes as Frank Edwards (8 episodes)
- Alex Cook as Lily Edwards (8 episodes)
- Zoe Naylor as Regan McLeod (4 episodes)
- Nicholas Bishop as Russ Connors (3 episodes)

=== Guest ===
- Anita Hegh as Sharon Buckingham (2 episodes)
- Aaron Jeffery as Alex Ryan (2 episodes)
- Alex Davies as Monique Black (2 episodes)
- Rachael Carpani as Jodi Fountain McLeod (1 episode)
- Sonia Todd as Meg Fountain (1 episode)
- Basia A'Hern as Rose Hall Smith (1 episode)
- Tahlia, Brooke & Kaitlyn Stacy-Clark as Charlotte McLeod (1 episode)
- Craig Stott as Jamie Mitchell (1 episode)

== Episodes ==
No. overall	No. in season	Title	Directed by	Written by	Original release date	Aus. viewers (millions)
203	1	"Aftermath"	Arnie Custo	Margaret Wilson	23 July 2008	1.09
Kate is obsessed with proving Riley survived the Christmas night car accident. The Drover's girls use 'olde worlde' technology to repair their windmill which broke and fell over during the recent flood.
204	2	"The Pitfalls of Love"	Arnie Custo	Nick Stevens	30 July 2008	0.88
Grace and Marcus are trapped at the bottom of an abandoned mine shaft. Kate helps Father Dan by caring for a cantankerous elderly woman, who makes her life a misery. Phil goes to extreme lengths to woo back Moira.
205	3	"Wild Ride"	Steve Mann	James Walker	6 August 2008	0.93
Stevie's wild-at-heart former rodeo mate Sharon visits Drover's and turns everyone's life upside down. Marcus sacrifices his chances in a major horse endurance race to save Ingrid from an abusive rider. Kate is feeling increasingly dissatisfied with life and throws herself into her new role as overseer.
206	4	"Nowhere to Hide"	Steve Mann	Sarah Duffy	6 December 2008	0.58
Stevie invites danger onto Drover's Run when she puts her trust in former rodeo mate Sharon. After helping a runaway youth return to his parents, Kate accepts a job running a Church-run farm for wayward youth and leaves Drover's Run. Tayler and Patrick move in together.
207	5	"Stand by Me"	Richard Jasek	Sam Carroll	13 December 2008	0.59
Tayler befriends a homeless girl and discovers some home truths of her own. Grace wonders if she can ever trust Stevie again, after learning Stevie has deceived her over a rodeo incident many years ago. Tayler and Patrick find living together is harder than they thought.
208	6	"Close Enough to Touch"	Richard Jasek	Christopher D. Hawkshaw	13 December 2008	0.59
Alex finally returns from Argentina, in time for the birth of his baby, but is killed in a freak accident. Reeling from Alex's shocking death, Stevie has a premature birth. Will she be able to bond with her new baby?
209	7	"Bringing Up Wombat"	Ian Watson	Greg Millin & Justine Gillmer	20 December 2008	N/A
Stevie struggles to adapt to life as a widow and single parent following Alex's death. Grace pretends to be Marcus's wife, in order to buy back his endurance horse. Tayler fears for the future of her relationship with Patrick. Moira discovers Phil has been dating another woman- so much for her supposed psychic abilities!
210	8	"Three Sisters"	Ian Watson	Chris Corbett	20 December 2008	N/A
Grace's world is rocked when her sister Jaz McLeod makes a surprise return to Drover's Run. Stevie's sexy cousin Ben sets hearts racing when he visits town. Patrick is terrified Tayler wants to have a baby with him. Moira tries to sabotage Phil's relationship with his new 'lady friend'.
211	9	"Dammed"	Arnie Custo	Peter Dick	27 December 2008	N/A
The girls mobilise the local community to prevent a massive dam being built upstream. Jaz is blackmailed by a pro-dam farmer, who threatens to reveal an explosive secret. Passions and rivalries erupt on the soccer field, during a fund-raiding sports day.
212	10	"Mother Love"	Arnie Custo	Sally Webb	27 December 2008	N/A
Tayler discovers the painful reasons why her mother abandoned her as a child. Ingrid's relationship with Marcus starts to have negative effects on her vet business. Ben is jealous of Frank's growing relationship with Jaz. Baby Xander will smile and laugh for everybody- except his mother Stevie.
213	11	"Bright Lights, Big Trouble"	Grant Brown	Liz Doran & Jane Allen	3 January 2009	N/A
Sparks fly when Jaz and Grace visit the city to protest against the dam that will destroy Drover's Run. Patrick is caught in the middle of a power struggle between Ben and Stevie over the management of Killarney. Moira is shocked to learn Phil has written a stage musical based on her life.
214	12	"Love and Let Die"	Grant Brown	Nick Stevens & Alexa Wyatt	3 January 2009	N/A
Frank threatens to detonate a deadly bomb during a town meeting over the controversial dam. Jaz ends her relationship with Frank, who allows this to push him into a deadly rage. Stevie and Marcus's lives are at risk when they accompany a visiting politician on a visit of the local area.
215	13	"A Dog's Life"	Steve Mann	Justine Gillmer	10 January 2009	N/A
Ben and Marcus work together to save an abused dog. Tayler is determined her pregnant dog Noisy will win the regional yard dog trials. Stevie joins a mother's group, but all she can talk about is her late husband Alex.
216	14	"My Prince Will Come"	Steve Mann	Michaeley O'Brien	10 January 2009	N/A
Jaz's ex-boyfriend arrives from Italy with a plan to save her Olympic career and win her back. Moira's world is turned upside down when she discovers she is pregnant.
217	15	"Snogging Frogs"	Richard Jasek	Christopher D. Hawkshaw	17 January 2009	0.61
Jaz is shattered when her Prince Charming betrays her. Patrick is jealous of Tayler's friendship with her 'study buddy'. Grace has a glamour makeover for a charity ball, and finds herself kissing Father Dan.
218	16	"The Merry Widow"	Richard Jasek	Sarah Duffy	17 January 2009	0.61
Stevie gets sweet revenge on a farmer spreading cruel rumours about her relationship with Marcus. Grace struggles with her romantic feelings for Father Dan. Moira and Phil make plans for parenthood, until tragedy strikes. Tayler suspects Patrick is planning to leave the district without her.
219	17	"Show Pony"	Arnie Custo	Chris Corbett	17 January 2009	0.61
Jaz attempts to retrain her show jumping horse to work on the property. Grace unwittingly befriends a visiting Detective, unaware he is Ingrid's dangerous ex-husband. Will Moira and Phil's relationship survive the trauma of her recent miscarriage?
220	18	"Every Move You Make"	Arnie Custo	Jane Allen	17 January 2009	0.61
Ingrid is pushed to breaking point as her ex-husband stalks and harasses her. Marcus' life is in danger due to his relationship with Ingrid. Tayler cheats on an essay in a desperate attempt to impress Patrick.
221	19	"Into Thin Air"	Steve Mann	Hamilton Budd & Justine Gillmer	24 January 2009	N/A
The Drover's Run girls race to prevent a tragedy when they learn Ingrid plans to kill her ex-husband. Ingrid disappears under mysterious circumstances. Grace creates a world of trouble when she admits her feelings for Marcus. Ben masterminds a bribery sting to catch a corrupt cop.
222	20	"The Show Must Go On"	Steve Mann	John Ridley	24 January 2009	N/A
Moira's star performance in the Gungellan musical is overshadowed by personal tragedy. Marcus is dangerously obsessed with tracking down Ingrid. Grace struggles with her guilt over her role in Ingrid's disappearance. Stevie is guilt stricken when she develops feeling for the handsome new veterinarian.
223	21	"Into the Valley of the Shadow"	Richard Jasek	Michaeley O'Brien	31 January 2009	0.58
Drover's Run faces its biggest crisis ever, and only a massive cattle drive will save them from financial ruin. But have they left it too late? A grain silo explodes with disastrous consequences. A massive cattle stampede puts lives in danger, and could spell disaster for Drover's Run. Ben and Jaz's new romance is threatened, when a past girlfriend arrives to win Ben back.
224	22	"The Long Paddock"	Richard Jasek	Alexa Wyatt	31 January 2009	0.58
Grace sacrifices her own romantic dreams to ensure Marcus and Ingrid are finally reunited. It's a surprise reunion as family and friends return to Drover's Run for Xander's first birthday party. Moira has dark premonitions about Phil's safety. Will she warn him in time? Tayler is forced to choose between her career and her relationship with Patrick.

== Reception ==
=== Ratings ===
The eighth season of Mcleod's Daughters suffered drastically in the ratings. On average, it was watched by a mere 633,000 viewers, down 547,000 viewers from the previous season, and an extreme drop compared to earlier seasons. It was the 9th most-watched Australian drama of 2008, and ranked at #29 for its eighth season.

=== Awards and nominations ===
The eighth season of McLeod's Daughters received three nominations at the 2009 Logie Awards. It also received one win at the 2009 APRA Awards.

Win

- APRA Award for Best Music for a Television Series or Serial (Alistair Ford – Episode 224)

Nominations

- Gold Logie Award for Most Popular Personality on Australian Television (Simmone Jade Mackinnon)
- Logie Award for Most Popular Actress (Simmone Jade Mackinnon)
- Logie Award for Most Popular Australian Drama Series

== Home media ==
Title	Release	Region	Ref(s)
McLeod's Daughters: The Complete Eighth & Final Series	3 November 2008	Australia –R4 DVD	
McLeod's Daughters: The Complete Eighth Season	5 May 2009	USA – R1 DVD	
McLeod's Töchter: Die Komplette Achte Staffel	22 March 2013	Germany – R2 DVD	
