= Levi Dunkleman =

- General Hospital character
- Portrayed by: Zachary Garred
- First appearance: April 9, 2014
- Last appearance: September 18, 2014
- Created by: Ron Carlivati
- Introduced by: Frank Valentini
In-universe information
- Other names: Levi Dunkleman
- Occupation: WSB agent
- Father: Peter Harrell
- Uncles: Prescott Harrell

Peter Harrell, Jr. commonly known by the pseudonym Levi Dunkleman is a fictional character from the original ABC Daytime soap opera General Hospital, played by Australian actor Zachary Garred. The character was introduced in April 2014 by executive producer, Frank Valentini under head writer, Ron Carlivati as a quirky environmentalist from Australia going by the name Levi Dunkleman. "Levi" comes to town as the new boyfriend of the recently returned Maxie Jones (Kirsten Storms) and he develops a rivalry with her roommate and potential love interest, Nathan West (Ryan Paevey). Levi has heavy influence in Maxie's life which doesn't sit well with Nathan or Maxie's stepfather, Mac Scorpio (John J. York). Levi proceeds to isolate Maxie from her friends and family by sabotaging her chances of regaining custody of her daughter and getting Nathan kicked out of their apartment. To keep Levi from being deported, Maxie agrees to marry him. On their wedding day, Nathan exposes that Levi has been after her mother, Felicia (Kristina Wagner)'s Aztec jewelry and Levi takes Maxie hostage. On August 26, 2014, it is revealed onscreen that Levi is the son of Felicia's late fiancé, Peter Harrell played by Judson Scott from 1984 to 1985.

== Development ==
=== Casting and creation ===
In early February 2014, the series put out a casting call for the role of Levi. In early March 2014, General Hospital Happenings reported that Kirsten Storms's return as Maxie Jones would help introduce the new character. News of Garred's casting was discussed on message boards for several weeks prior to the announcement. On March 18, 2014, it was announced that Zachary Garred had been cast in the recurring role of Levi and would share his first scenes with the recently returned Storms. Garred announced that he would debut April 3, 2014. However, the former Home and Away alum, instead appeared on April 9, 2014. Soaps In Depth described Levi as a "spiritual counselor of sorts" for Maxie. Of the casting, the actor said "Being able to be a part of such an auspicious show with such a huge lineage is very rare, [so] I feel lucky." The actor revealed on Twitter that he was only scheduled to appear for two months. In late July 2014, ABC Soaps In Depth confirmed that the actor would be sticking around after the end of his initial 12 week arc.

=== Characterization and portrayal ===
"Playing the villain has been really enjoyable. I've never played the bad guy before; I've always been the leading man or the boy next door, a nice bloke, never anything that's been so manipulative and Machiavellian, something that really draws the ire of the audience. That in itself is a very new adventure for me."

— Zachary Garred on playing a villain. (2014)

The initial casting call was said to be between the ages of 27 and 35, "cute" and "appealing." Levi has a "new age vibe." He is "soulful, zen" and "chill." Levi is more worried about "saving the planet" than his appearance. Levi has "long hair" and a "shaggy presence." Initial rumors described the character as "comical." The character was described as a "guru" who could potentially have familial ties to an already established character. Other sources described Garred's Levi as a "free spirit." Jamey Giddens described Levi as a "new age chap." Soap Opera Network said Levi is "as groovy as the turquoise waters" of Garred's home country of Australia. Levi was described as a "peace and love hippie." In an interview with On-Air On-Soaps Garred said of his portrayal –– "you play him with conceited conviction, because he believes everything he is saying." Executive producer Frank Valentini instructed the actor to avoid playing up typical hipster angle because it was already organically present in the character. Garred instead played the role "with that sort of duplicitous angle underneath" which he described as being quite "infuriating." Garred commented that Levi who is "underhanded and duplicitous" catches so many people off guard because it's so unexpected. Garred praised head writer, Ron Carlivati and his team for giving him the material and said pitting his character up against the attractive "all American hero" in Ryan Paevey's Nathan helped. Garred gave credit to Valentini for his advice early on about portraying the character. Garred quoted his boss in saying, "You just have to play it really honest. He believes what he does and he wants Maxie to believe with him."

=== Causing angst ===
During an interview with Soap Opera Digest discussing May Sweeps, Ron Carlivai explained that Levi would take every opportunity to exploit Maxie and Nathan's "dislike" for each other. Throughout the summer, Maxie faces another hurdle in trying to regain custody of her daughter. Nathan and Levi's difference in opinion over how to handle the situation causes more tension. Ron Carlivati described Maxie's unhealthy relationship with Levi as a "stumbling block" for a potential romance between Maxie and Nathan. As Garred's initial 12 week arc comes to a close, in story, Levi faces possible deportation when it is discovered that his visa has expired. Garred commented to Soap Opera Digest that it is a question of "How desperate is [Levi] to stay and what are the lengths he'll go to to maintain his residency –– and his relationship with Maxie?" When an immigration agent shows up to confront Levi, Zachary Garred explained that Levi is grateful that Maxie stands by him because "Her support is the only support he has!" In addition to Nathan hating him, Levi has ostracized himself from Mac because he has "basically kidnapped [Maxie's] personality." According to Garred, Levi depends on Maxie specifically. While the audience is aware of Levi's "duplicitous" ways, and Mac and Nathan constantly suspect that he is up to no good, Maxie is completely in the dark about Levi. Having Maxie as his only support "plays into his plan of having her exclusively to himself." As more evidence points to Nathan, Garred confirms that getting Nathan away from Maxie is his "ultimate goal." Levi can see the chemistry between them and the immigration thing allows Levi to use his own misfortune to his advantage. Even if he were to get deported, Levi would have succeeded in driving a permanent wedge between Maxie and Nathan.

=== Levi's identity ===
Ron Carlivati revealed that Garred's portrayal inspired the writers to expand his role beyond the "hippie vegan who seemed very sincere in his beliefs." During the week of August 11, 2014, the character's true purpose slowly starts to unravel as Levi and Maxie's wedding draws near. When Nathan confronts Levi about his plans to steal the Aztec jewelry from Maxie' mother, Felicia (Kristina Wagner), things spiral out of control as Levi is willing to take extreme measures to see his plan through. Carlivati was very aware that fans were very against Maxie becoming Levi's wife because Levi had been doing "evil things behind her back." It is Levi's evil agenda that moves the story forward during the wedding. Levi has manipulated Maxie into the marriage and she is so worried about proving everyone wrong that she digs in her heels. In addition to revealing Levi's true agenda, the wedding also launches another story. The jewels are not "endgame." While Levi's vendetta against the Jones family is made evident, it is clear that Maxie's best friend, Lulu Spencer-Falconeri (Emme Rylan) also factors into the mystery. The next twist in the story raises the stakes. Carlivati revealed in an interview that another villain would factor into the story and said "I think this is going to be a classic, old-school General Hospital action/adventure story" similar to the iconic 1980s Ice Princess storyline.

Zachary Garred as Peter Harrell (Jr.) with his shorter haircut after the character's true identity is exposed.

During an interview with Michael Fairman of On-Air On-Soaps during General Hospital Fan Club Weekend (GHFCW), Garred revealed that his character was the son of an already established character. At the fan event, Garred also debuted a shorter hair cut which he said would factor into his character's story. On August 26, 2014, Levi was revealed to the son and namesake of Peter Harrell (Judson Scott), Felicia's ex-lover. On August 28, 2014, the character appeared with his new look. Garred explained that with the revelation about Levi's identity, he thought it was "appropriate" to get rid of the disguise altogether. In an interview published on the ABC website, Garred stated that "Frank [Valentini] suggested some ideas to me and I jumped at the chance to cut my hair." The actor described the new haircut as the revealing of the "real Levi. The bloke under the hair and hippy guise who has been so manipulative. But given how underhanded he has been maybe this isn't the last incarnation Levi takes…" Garred revealed that he always hoped to do something for charity with his hair and he donated it to Locks of Love non-profit organization. "Fans often asked if my hair was a wig, so it was only fitting that it went on to help in some way."

== Storylines ==
Levi accompanies his girlfriend Maxie (Kirsten Storms) back to her hometown of Port Charles in April 2014 and immediately clashes with her roommate, Nathan West (Ryan Paevey). While Levi is able to charm Maxie's mother, Felicia (Kristina Wagner), he rubs her adoptive father Mac Scorpio (John J. York) the wrong way. Levi also convinces Maxie not to seek custody of her infant daughter Georgie and use the experience as a lesson. Levi disapproves when he learns Maxie is trying to regain custody of her baby, at Nathan's encouragement. Levi supports Maxie when she loses custody of her daughter again after someone tips off the judge about Nathan covering for Maxie because she misses her original courtdate. It turns out Levi did sabotage Maxie's custody hearing though he denies any involvement when Nathan accuses him of tipping off the judge. Levi ropes Maxie into a protest to stop the ELQ waterfront renovation project claiming it will hurt the people who already live on the waterfront. ELQ's CEO Michael Corinthos (Chad Duell) calls the police to have them arrested for trespassing on private property, and Levi spends the night in jail. After he is released, Levi discovers his visa has expired and he may soon be deported. In order to drive a wedge between Maxie and Nathan, Levi frames Nathan by calling immigration on himself from Nathan's phone. Though Nathan claims innocence, a furious Maxie kicks him out of their apartment. Maxie and Levi then brainstorm on how to keep him from being deported and she proposes marriage. As they prepare for the wedding, Mac and Nathan are still suspicious of Levi, specifically because of his interest in Felicia's Aztec jewelry. Just before the wedding, Felicia confides in Maxie and Levi she traded a piece of the jewelry collection to help a friend. When the necklace is stolen, Nathan becomes suspicious of Levi and confronts him moments before the wedding and finds the necklace. A struggle ensues. Levi knocks Nathan out and ties him up as he prepares for the wedding. Nathan's partner, Dante Falconeri (Dominic Zamprogna) finds Nathan and frees him. Nathan tries to arrest Levi until his accomplice, the supposed "immigration" agent, Jeffrey Scribner (Jamil Walker Smith) takes Dante's wife and Maxie's matron of honor, Lulu (Emme Rylan) hostage. Levi and Scribner escape with Maxie and Lulu at gunpoint and they hide out in cabin in the woods. Scribner assumes the girls will be released after they fence the stolen jewelry for cash, but Levi has other plans. Levi shoots Scribner and escapes with the girls. While in the hospital, Scribner reveals that Levi is actually Peter Harrell, Jr., the son of Felicia's ex fiancé (Judson Scott). Levi takes Maxie and Lulu to a secluded cabin where he plans on meeting boss (later revealed to be Victor Cassadine (Thaao Penghlis) who was helping him hold Robin Scorpio-Drake (Kimberly McCullough) hostage. Dante and Nathan corner Levi, and he is shot in the shoulder. At that moment, Victor and his men abduct the entire group. Levi recovers and finds Maxie at the bedside of his very much alive father, Peter Harrell (David Gautreaux). As father and son plan to kill Maxie, Nathan rushes in and kills Peter with a single shot to the back. Nathan and Levi fight with Levi gaining the upper hand, until Maxie kills Levi by stabbing him in the back. Levi's remains appear to have been destroyed when the clinic exploded.

== Reception ==
"I think he's really great... You know, we wrote the character pretty straight at the beginning. I mean nothing of what he believed was really so awful! If anything, it was Nathan who seemed a little pigheaded to me. But there is just this little element of insincerity, something that Zachary is bringing to it which is making people just jump down his throat, which was out intention."

— Ron Carlivati on Garred's portrayal and fan reaction. (2014)

Majority of viewers immediately hated the character and Michael Fairman credited the actor with "Playing The Most Despised Man on General Hospital." ABC Soaps In Depth compared the character to several others that had been recently introduced and described Levi as a "caricature masquerading as a character." The magazine said the writers made Garred's job of making the character "likeable" an "impossible task." According to the magazine, Garred's job was made more difficult due to the "instant chemistry" between Ryan Paevey and Kirsten Storms. Soap columnist Carolyn Hinsey also criticized the story, "Soaps are doing that thing again where they write big stories for new characters we don't care about … which never works," and continued by saying, "But nothing is worse than Levi, the blunder from Down Under." Hinsey said the "green-card" marriage was too predictable and thought the writers could have come with a much better obstacle for Nathan and Maxie. Soaps In Depth praised Zachary Garred for being a "good sport" about the backlash from fans. On the feud between Levi and Nathan, Soaps In Depth said that while most viewers understandably wanted Levi gone, "we kinda love scenes where his portrayer, Zachary Garred, matches wits with Ryan Paevey's Nathan." Though both characters are almost "cartoonishly stuck in their respective good guy/bad guy roles," the magazine pointed out that it had work for the show a lot in recent years. SID continued by saying that while the actors appeared to be enjoying themselves, "so are we!" Carlivati was happy about the audience's absolute hatred of the Levi character and praised Zachary Garred's portrayal. The actor was receptive to the hatred from fans thought, "Wow! This is cool!" Garred joked that, "Even my own dad said he wanted to smack me in the face when he was watching Levi." Carolyn Hinsey said the writers took too long to reveal Levi's true identity, "but once they did, the denouement was a gem."
