= Pulse (2017 film) =

2017 film

- Directed by: Stevie Cruz-Martin
- Written by: Daniel Monks
- Produced by: Stevie Cruz-Martin, Daniel Monks, Gemma Hall
- Starring: Caroline Brazier; Daniel Monks; Scott Lee
- Cinematography: Stevie Cruz-Martin
- Edited by: Daniel Monks
- Music by: Featurette
- Release date: 2017
- Running time: 84 minutes
- Country: Australia
- Language: English

Pulse is a 2017 Australian drama film starring and written by Daniel Monks.

== Plot ==
Disabled teenager Olly is unhappy that whilst his schoolmates are all dating and experiencing love, he is needing a further operation to help improve his mobility, due to debilitating osteoporosis. He decides to undergo a new experimental procedure that requires a total body swap, and in the process, requests that his new body be that of a female.

As 'Olivia', he/she is now attractive and popular with both boys and girls, but along with this, he/she experiences a whole personality change, which is unbecoming. Olivia decides to confess to best friend Luke, that Olly had always been in love with him, and he lives in hope that now he is a woman, Luke may finally return the love.

== Cast ==
- Caroline Brazier as Jacqui
- Daniel Monks as Olly
- Scott Lee as Luke
- Jaimee Peasley as Olivia
- Sian Ewers as Nat
- Isaro Kayitesi as Britney
- Troy Rodger as Mark
- David Richardson as Brandon
- Lee Jankowski as Trev
- Kate Neylon as Dr Barker
- Evan Williams as Physiotherapist
- Alex Malone as Sarah
- Jad Abid as Sonny

== Reception ==
Rotten Tomatoes lists 7 critics with 6 assessed as fresh and 1 as rotten. It gave the film a score of 86%.

Norman Gidney of Film Threat gives a positive review, writing "Misgivings set aside; there is plenty to enjoy in Pulse. The deft direction from Cruz-Martin cuts nimbly back and forth between personal image and perception, allowing us to stay with our main character. Monks’ performance as Olly is beautifully sincere and hits moments of honesty that truly resonate."

== Awards ==
- 8th AACTA Awards
  - Best Lead Actor - Daniel Monks - nominated
