= McLeod's Daughters season 7 =

McLeod's Daughters
- Season 7
- Season 7 DVD
- Starring: Simmone Jade Mackinnon Rachael Carpani Abi Tucker
- No. of episodes: 32

Release
- Original network: Nine Network
- Original release: 7 February – 17 October 2007

Season chronology
- ← Previous; Season 6 Next → Season 8

The seventh season of the long-running Australian outback drama McLeod's Daughters began airing on 7 February 2007 and concluded on 17 October 2007 with a total of 32 episodes.

== Plot ==
Jodi's world is turned upside down when Matt suddenly reappears, forcing her to choose between Matt and Riley, a decision that could have deadly consequences. Kate returns following a mysterious twist of events. The wild-at-heart Grace Kingston arrives having inherited part of the Drover's Run, and faces the challenge of a reconciliation with her estranged sister, Regan. Alex finally meets his half-brother, Marcus. Tayler struggles to fit in at Drover's Run. Alex attempts to pop the question to Stevie, with a series of disastrous consequences, while Stevie is forced to face her own personal demons.

== Cast ==
=== Main ===
- Simmone Jade Mackinnon as Stevie Hall (28 episodes)
- Rachael Carpani as Jodi Fountain (8 episodes)
- Abi Tucker as Grace Kingston (24 episodes) (Note: Abi Tucker had been listed as recurring previous to being upgraded to main character status)
- Matt Passmore as Marcus Turner (31 episodes) (Note: Matthew Passmore had been listed as recurring previous to being upgraded to main character status)
- Aaron Jeffery as Alex Ryan (21 episodes) (Note: Whilst removed from the opening credits, Aaron Jeffery was listed as a main in the closing cast block)
- Michala Banas as Kate Manfredi (26 episodes) (Note: While appearing in the opening title sequence, Michala Banas was removed briefly from the closing credit block as her character did not appear in the first six episodes of the season, returned briefly and left for Africa, returning permanently four episodes later)
- Gillian Alexy as Tayler Geddes
- Luke Jacobz as Patrick Brewer
- Dustin Clare as Riley Ward
- Zoe Naylor as Regan McLeod (14 episodes)
- Doris Younane as Moira Doyle (Note: Whilst not in the opening credits, Doris Younane was listed as a main in the closing cast block)

=== Recurring ===
- Peter Hardy as Phil Rakich (19 episodes)
- Sandy Winton as Heath Barrett (15 episodes)
- Sam Healy as Ashleigh Redstaff (13 episodes)
- Jonny Pasvolsky as Matt Bosnich (8 episodes)
- Craig Stott as Jamie Mitchell (7 episodes)
- Basia A'Hern as Rose Hall Smith (5 episodes)
- John Stanton as Bryce Redstaff (5 episodes)
- Rachael Coopes as Ingrid Marr (3 episodes)

=== Guest ===
- Carmel Johnson as Beth Martin (4 episodes)
- Reece Horner as Nat (4 episodes)
- Patrick Frost as Neil Thompson (3 episodes)
- Callan Mulvey as Mitch Wahlberg (3 episodes)
- Genevieve Picot as Helen Hall (2 episodes)
- Rebecca Hall as Dana Rivers (2 episodes)
- Sonia Todd as Meg Fountain (1 episode)
- Jay Laga'aia as Gabriel (1 episode)
- Trudy Hellier as Barbara Geddes (1 episode)
- Josef Ber as Hugh McLeod (1 episode)

Cast of Season 7

== Episodes ==
No. overall	No. in season	Title	Directed by	Written by	Original release date	Aus. viewers (millions)
171	1	"Second Chances"	Arnie Custo	Nick Stevens & Jane Allen	7 February 2007	1.18
Jodi's new-found happiness is shattered when, totally unannounced, Matt suddenly reappears. With the trial over and free of his assumed identity, he's journeyed back to the place and the girl that have meant so much to him.
172	2	"All the Wrong Places"	Arnie Custo	Michaeley O'Brien & Sarah Duffy	14 February 2007	1.15
A handsome stranger arrives at Drovers looking for Killarney. His name is Marcus Turner. After Regan gives her a second chance, Tayler's attempt to impress the Drover's Run girls goes disastrously wrong.
173	3	"Digging Up the Past"	Richard Jasek	Margaret Wilson	21 February 2007	1.15
When a sale falls through, Matt, who started working for Jim Selkirk, arranges for Jim to buy them. Bringing the sheep in, Jodi discovers an angry rash has developed on her wrists and ankles. When she and Patrick find an injured possum inside the house, Tayler insists on caring for it.
174	4	"Thicker than Water"	Richard Jasek	Jane Allen & Justine Gillmer	28 February 2007	1.17
Riley's estranged father Bill visits Drover's Run. When Marcus phones Nick in Argentina to talk business, it's the last straw for Alex. Meanwhile, Tayler is thrilled that the baby possum has flourished in her care.
175	5	"Reaching Out"	Andrew Prowse	Chris McCourt	7 March 2007	1.21
Jodi is becoming increasingly disturbed about Emma McLeod and the identity of her secret lover. Meanwhile, Alex, angry that Marcus lied to him for so long, is doing his best to not deal with the fact that he and Marcus are brothers.
176	6	"Returned Favour"	Andrew Prowse	Chris Hawkshaw	14 March 2007	1.32
Riley and Matt both declare their love for Jodi, but who will she choose? Stevie risks losing Alex when she helps Marcus with a secret cattle deal. Jodi has an overnight vigil in the National Park with Matt, when her horse Tucker is bitten by a tiger snake.
177	7	"Of Hearts and Hunters"	Richard Jasek	Nick Stevens	21 March 2007	1.32
Jodi faces a gut-wrenching decision when Matt is forced back into witness protection - will she choose love over Drover's Run? It's sibling rivalry gone mad when Marcus and Alex compete to woo Stevie.
178	8	"Climb Every Mountain"	Richard Jasek	Michaeley O'Brien	11 April 2007	1.33
Kate uncovers the shocking truth about the murder of Jodi and Matt. Meg returns for Jodi's funeral with a bizarre secret and Regan receives a surprising legacy from Jodi's will.
179	9	"Sisters Are Doing it for Themselves"	Grant Brown	Margaret Wilson	18 April 2007	1.24
Regan tries to reconcile her wild-at-heart sister, Grace McLeod, after Grace inherits a partial share of Drover's Run. Meanwhile, Riley is seduced by a sexy cowgirl, with disastrous results.
180	10	"The Rules of Engagement"	Grant Brown	Jane Allen	25 April 2007	1.36
Alex's plan to propose to Stevie goes horribly wrong when a series of accidents and disasters threatens to ruin their relationship. Another relationship is tested when Kate and Riley are caught in a game of theft and deception over stray cattle.
181	11	"Bloodlines"	Declan Eames	Jane Allen	2 May 2007	1.24
When sheep rustlers steal Drovers Run's breeding stock, reckless Grace takes the law into her own hands. Impressed by Grace's determination, Regan struggles to persuade her to stay permanently with them at Drover's Run.
182	12	"Warts and All"	Declan Eames	Chris McCourt	9 May 2007	1.18
Bryce resorts to blackmail to force Alex and Stevie into signing a prenuptial agreement. Marcus deals with financial troubles of his own when he buys a racehorse.
183	13	"Conflict of Interests"	Arnie Custo	James Walker	16 May 2007	1.18
Loyalties are tested when Grace forces Regan to choose between her family and her new lover. Meanwhile the women fight to stop Drover’s Run becoming the site of a toxic waste dump!
184	14	"Flesh and Stone"	Arnie Custo	Chris Hawkshaw	30 May 2007	1.28
Grace kidnaps a government official to prevent the toxic dump from going ahead, while Tayler and Patrick use guerrilla tactics of their own to save Drover's Run.
185	15	"All's Fair in Love and War"	Steve Jodrell	Jane Allen	6 June 2007	1.29
Old wounds are opened when Stevie's estranged mother visits Drover's Run and Rose tries to force a reconciliation. Passions are also aroused when Stevie and Alex organize a laser skirmish for their combined bucks and hens party.
186	16	"Ever After"	Steve Jodrell	Margaret Wilson	20 June 2007	1.40
It's Alex and Stevie's wedding day, but will Alex get out of jail in time for the service? Also standing in the couple's way is Alex's sister Ashleigh, who tries to ruin the wedding and take over control of Killarney.
187	17	"Grace Under Fire"	Grant Brown	Sarah Smith	27 June 2007	1.26
With Alex away on his honeymoon, Ashleigh undermines Marcus's authority on Killarney. Ashleigh seduces Patrick, and Tayler is surprised to find herself feeling jealous.
188	18	"Gift Horse"	Arnie Custo	Anthony Ellis	11 July 2007	1.08
Grace is determined to resist Heath's charms -- but for how long? Grace questions her future on Drover's Run when her best friend dies suddenly.
189	19	"Hot Water"	Arnie Custo	James Walker	18 July 2007	1.12
Grace and Kate are taken hostage by a bankrupt farmer. Moira has a premonition that someone will be shot by the gunman – but who will it be?
190	20	"Leaving the Nest"	Declan Eames	Chris Hawkshaw	25 July 2007	1.16
Stevie's daughter Rose suffers a tragic farm accident that will change the lives of everyone on Drover's Run forever. Meanwhile, Grace takes desperate measures to repay her secret loan to Ashleigh.
191	21	"A Spark from Heaven"	Declan Eames	Chris Hawkshaw	1 August 2007	1.21
A guardian angel visits Drover's Run to make the girls' dreams come true. Except for Rose, who returns from the hospital in a wheelchair and is involved in a freak car crash. But was it really an accident?
192	22	"The Courage Within"	Declan Eames	Chris McCourt	8 August 2007	1.07
While the girls investigate a mysterious explosion at the fuel dump, Rose is trapped inside the homestead during a brazen robbery attempt.
193	23	"Divided We Stand"	Richard Jasek	Jane Allen & Tracey Trinder	15 August 2007	1.08
Stevie is forced to leave Drover's Run when Grace accuses her of disloyalty. Riley also makes a dangerous enemy of his own when he rejects Ashleigh's advances.
194	24	"On the Prowl"	Richard Jasek	Margaret Wilson	22 August 2007	1.07
Blinded by love, Kate helps her new beau, Mitch, hide from the police when he is accused of trading stolen army weapons. Meanwhile, a dangerous beast is killing Drover's stock. Is it a wild dog, or something more exotic?
195	25	"Fanning the Flames"	Nick Bufalo	Anthony Ellis	29 August 2007	0.99
Drover's Run and other local farms are the victims of a professional arsonist. Stevie and Grace investigate the attack and uncover a conspiracy to bankrupt local farmers. Could Phil Rakich be responsible?
196	26	"My Enemy, My Friend"	Nick Bufalo	Justine Gillmer	5 September 2007	1.08
When a stud bull on Drovers Run is killed, the girls are convinced someone is trying to bankrupt them. Grace's new friendship with Ashleigh is destroyed when she discovers Ashleigh is the culprit.
197	27	"Knight in Shining Armor"	Grant Brown	Greg Millin	12 September 2007	1.18
Grace is shocked when Heath proposes marriage. Will she accept? The future of Drover's Run hangs in the balance when Ashleigh forces Grace to sell her heritage.
198	28	"The Short Cut"	Grant Brown	Alexa Wyatt	19 September 2007	1.09
While Grace takes drastic action to catch a cattle thief, Ashleigh has to face the impending death of her father. The women of Drover's Run are hit with devastating news of their own when local bank manager Adam Gardiner returns.
199	29	"Seeing is Believing"	Arnie Custo	Jane Allen	26 September 2007	0.94
Kate is convinced she has killed Ashleigh in a hit-and-run accident, but where is the body? Meanwhile, Tayler meets her long-lost mother under bizarre circumstances.
200	30	"Second Chances"	Arnie Custo	Chris Hawkshaw	3 October 2007	1.01
A mysterious stranger forces Grace to reconsider her future with Heath. Is the love of her life being faithful to her? Grace weighs the heavy decision of whether to end their relationship.
201	31	"Mixed Messages"	Richard Jasek	Sarah Duffy	10 October 2007	1.08
Marcus suspects Heath is cheating on Grace. Is jealousy clouding his judgment? Grace continues to question Heath's love for her, until he surprises her with an amazing gift.
202	32	"Silent Night"	Richard Jasek	Chris McCourt	17 October 2007	1.21
It's Christmas Eve, and Alex makes a surprise return from Argentina to visit Stevie. But the happiness is short-lived when Grace, Riley, Tayler and Patrick are involved in a shocking car accident. Who will survive?

== Reception ==
=== Ratings ===
On average, the seventh season of McLeod's Daughters was watched by 1.18 million viewers, down 10% and 130,000 viewers from the previous season. It was the 4th most-watched Australian drama of 2007, behind City Homicide, All Saints and Home and Away, respectively, and ranked at #11 for its seventh season.

No.	Title	Air date	Overnight ratings		Ref(s)
No.	Title	Air date	Viewers	Rank	Ref(s)
1	"Second Chances"	7 February 2007	1,181,000	9	
2	"All the Wrong Places"	14 February 2007	1,148,000	7	
3	"Digging Up the Past"	21 February 2007	1,146,000	7	
4	"Thicker Than Water"	28 February 2007	1,166,000	9	
5	"Reaching Out"	7 March 2007	1,213,000	6	
6	"Returned Favour"	14 March 2007	1,321,000	2	
7	"Of Hearts and Hunters"	21 March 2007	1,320,000	3	
8	"Climb Every Mountain"	11 April 2007	1,333,000	2	
9	"Sisters Are Doing it for Themselves"	18 April 2007	1,243,000	4	
10	"Rules of Engagement"	25 April 2007	1,355,000	6	
11	"Bloodlines"	2 May 2007	1,242,000	5	
12	"Warts and All"	9 May 2007	1,184,000	10	
13	"Conflict of Interests"	16 May 2007	1,184,000	10	
14	"Flesh and Stone"	30 May 2007	1,282,000	6	
15	"All's Fair in Love and War"	6 June 2007	1,289,000	9	
16	"Ever After"	20 June 2007	1,401,000	4	
17	"Grace Under Fire"	27 June 2007	1,262,000	7	
18	"Gift Horse"	11 July 2007	1,083,000	15	
19	"Hot Water"	18 July 2007	1,122,000	14	
20	"Leaving the Nest"	25 July 2007	1,156,000	11	
21	"A Spark from Heaven"	1 August 2007	1,205,000	8	
22	"The Courage Within"	8 August 2007	1,072,000	12	
23	"Divided We Stand"	15 August 2007	1,083,000	12	
24	"On the Prowl"	22 August 2007	1,072,000	13	
25	"Fanning the Flames"	29 August 2007	989,000	14	
26	"My Enemy, My Friend"	5 September 2007	1,078,000	14	
27	"Knight in Shining Armor"	12 September 2007	1,181,000	8	
28	"The Short Cut"	19 September 2007	1,094,000	13	
29	"Seeing is Believing"	26 September 2007	937,000	16	
30	"Second Chances"	3 October 2007	1,008,000	16	
31	"Mixed Messages"	10 October 2007	1,076,000	16	
32	"Silent Night"	17 October 2007	1,207,000	9	

=== Award nominations ===
The seventh season of McLeod's Daughters received two nominations at the 2008 Logie Awards.

- Logie Award for Most Popular Actress (Simmone Jade Mackinnon)
- Logie Award for Most Popular Drama Series

== Home media ==
Title	Release	Region	Format	Ref(s)
McLeod's Daughters: The Complete Seventh Series	30 April 2008	Australia – R4	DVD	
McLeod's Daughters: The Complete Seventh Season	9 December 2008	USA – R1	DVD	
McLeod's Töchter: Die Komplette Siebte Staffel	22 March 2013	Germany – R2	DVD	
