= Time Trackers =

- Created by: Donna Malane; Paula Boock
- Directed by: Thomas Robins; Danny Mulheron
- Starring: Joe Dekkers-Reihana; Kazimir Sas; Felicity Milovanovich; Marcus Graham; Vaughan Slinn; Jon English; David Smyth
- Narrated by: Georgia Rippin
- Composer: Ash Gibson Greig
- Countries of origin: Australia; New Zealand
- Original language: English
- No. of seasons: 1
- No. of episodes: 13

Production
- Producers: Paula Boock; Dave Gibson; Donna Malane; Sue Taylor
- Production locations: Wellington, New Zealand
- Cinematography: Simon Baumfield
- Editor: David C. Jones
- Running time: 30 minutes
- Production companies: Taylor Media; Gibson Group

Original release
- Network: Seven Network (Australia); TV2 (New Zealand)
- Release: 22 September – 15 December 2008

Time Trackers is a children's television series produced for the Seven Network in Australia and TV2 in New Zealand. The 13 half-hour episodes first screened in 2008. The series is a co-production of Gibson Group in New Zealand and Taylor Media in Australia.

== Premise ==
Teenagers from different periods of history join forces to fight viruses threatening the history of human inventions.

== Cast and characters ==
=== Main cast ===
- Joe Dekkers-Reihana as Captain Wiremu Love
- Kazimir Sas as Troy
- Felicity Milovanovich as Carmen
- Marcus Graham as Kevin (Dult version 10.1 and reprogrammed as a version 12.4)
- Vaughan Slinn as Stuart (Dult version 10.1)
- Jon English as Old Troy
- Georgia Rippin as the Narrator
- David Smyth as the voice of Balls (robot dog)

=== Guest cast ===
- Igor Sas as Galileo
- Angus Sampson as Leonardo da Vinci
- Erroll Shand as Isaac Newton
- Emmett Skilton as Ernest Rutherford

== Episodes ==
No.	Title	Directed by	Written by	Australian air date	N.Z. air date
1	"Gadget 2008"	Thomas Robins	Donna Malane	22 September 2008	14 March 2009
2	"Round Spinning Thing 2088 PH"	Thomas Robins	Donna Malane	29 September 2008	21 March 2009
3	"Pendulum Swing Like a Pendulum Do"	Thomas Robins	Donna Malane	6 October 2008	28 March 2009
4	"Gutenberg"	Thomas Robins	Tim Gooding	13 October 2008	4 April 2009
5	"Da Vinci"	Thomas Robins	Miranda Wilson	20 October 2008	18 April 2009
6	"The Pacemaker"	Danny Mulheron	Donna Malane	27 October 2008	25 April 2009
7	"Music Wars"	Danny Mulheron	Ron Elliot	3 November 2008	2 May 2009
8	"Mad King George"	Thomas Robins	Tim Gooding	10 November 2008	9 May 2009
9	"Newton"	Thomas Robins	Paula Boock	17 November 2008	16 May 2009
10	"Fire-pop"	Danny Mulheron	Tim Gooding	24 November 2008	23 May 2009
11	"The Future"	Danny Mulheron	Doug MacLeod	1 December 2008	30 May 2009
12	"Split Atoms"	Danny Mulheron	Paula Boock	8 December 2008	6 June 2009
13	"The Final Countdown"	Danny Mulheron	Donna Malane	15 December 2008	13 June 2009

== See also ==
- List of Australian television series
