= McLeod's Daughters season 6 =

McLeod's Daughters
- Season 6
- Season 6 DVD
- Starring: Bridie Carter Simmone Jade Mackinnon Rachael Carpani
- No. of episodes: 32

Release
- Original network: Nine Network
- Original release: 15 February – 29 November 2006

Season chronology
- ← Previous; Season 5 Next → Season 7

The sixth season of the long-running Australian outback drama McLeod's Daughters began airing on 15 February 2006 and concluded on 29 November 2006 after 32 episodes.

Bridie Carter (Tess), Simmone Jade Mackinnon (Stevie), Rachael Carpani (Jodi), Aaron Jeffery (Alex), Michala Banas (Kate), Brett Tucker (Dave), and Jonny Pasvolsky (Rob/Matt) all returned as main cast members from the previous season. Myles Pollard (Nick) returned for two episodes to wrap up his character's story line. This is the last season to feature Pollard and Carter, as Bridie Carter leaves the series early in the season with Pollard's character. Jonny Pasvolsky leaves the show early in the season, but his character makes a guest appearance in the season finale, and will also return during the seventh season. This is the last season to feature Brett Tucker as his character leaves for Africa in the season finale.

Luke Jacobz returns as a main character playing Dave's brother Patrick. Jacobz has a guest appearance in the fifth season as Patrick. Zoe Naylor returns as a main cast member as Regan McLeod after being a recurring character in the previous season.

Doris Younane has a more recurring role as Moira Doyle. She will become a main cast member in the final two seasons. Dustin Clare joins as the recurring role of Riley Ward, but will act as a main cast member in the following season. Sonia Todd (Meg) returns for several episodes and wraps up her story line with John Jarratt (Terry). Todd will reprise her role in the final two seasons as well, where this is Jarratt's final season on the show. Marshall Napier (Harry) and Inge Hornstra (Sandra) appear for their last season on the series as Napier's character, Harry, dies and Hornstra's character, Sandra, causes his death.

Daniel Feuerriegel (Leo) and Basia A'Hern (Rose) also return from the previous season in recurring roles and a story line together.

== Cast ==
=== Regular ===
- Bridie Carter as Tess Silverman McLeod Ryan (Note: Tess appears only in episodes 1–8 as Bridie Carter departed the series.)
- Simmone Jade Mackinnon as Stevie Hall
- Rachael Carpani as Jodi Fountain McLeod
- Aaron Jeffery as Alex Ryan
- Michala Banas as Kate Manfredi
- Brett Tucker as Dave Brewer
- Jonny Pasvolsky as Rob Shelton/Matt Bosnich (Note: Rob/Matt appears in episodes 1—9, but returned in a guest appearance in episode 32.)
- Luke Jacobz as Patrick Brewer (Note: Patrick makes his first regular appearance from episode 9; he previously made a guest appearance in Season 5.)
- Zoe Naylor as Regan McLeod (Note: Regan makes her first regular appearance from episode 11; she previously had a recurring role in Season 5.)

=== Recurring ===
- Doris Younane as Moira Doyle
- Myles Pollard as Nick Ryan
- Sonia Todd as Meg Fountain
- Michelle Langstone as Fiona Webb Ryan
- Marshall Napier as Harry Ryan
- Inge Hornstra as Sandra Ryan
- John Jarratt as Terry Dodge
- Daniel Feuerriegel as Leo Coombes
- Dustin Clare as Riley Ward
- Peter Hardy as Phil Rakich
- Patrick Frost as Neil Thompson
- Basia A'Hern as Rose Hall-Smith

Cast of Season 6

=== Guest ===
- Catherine Wilkin as Liz Ryan
- Henry Nixon as Greg Dawson
- Gillian Alexy as Tayler Geddes

== Episodes ==
No. overall	No. in season	Title	Directed by	Written by	Original release date	Aus. viewers (millions)
139	1	"Lost and Found"	Arnie Custo	Chris McCourt	15 February 2006	1.32
In the sixth season premiere, Jodi tells Tess that she is Jack McLeod's daughter and her half-sister. Tess doesn't take the news exactly how Jodi had imagined she would. Tess, meanwhile, is trying to put the pieces together after Nick's death. Elsewhere, Stevie anticipates Alex's return so she can reveal her true feelings, but is blindsided by Alex's return—with Fiona Webb, his fiancée. And, Harry's race horse escapes.
140	2	"Truth Hurts"	Richard Jasek	Andrew Kelly	22 February 2006	1.37
Tess asks Jodi to move into the house with her and Stevie, but the two realize it may be too fast for that to happen. Kate, now alone without Jodi, compensates her depression by focusing on keeping the lambs protected after losing one. Meanwhile, Stevie discovers that Fiona has secrets- she broke off an engagement to another man three weeks prior. Fiona, meanwhile, is delighted by a wedding announcement she thinks Alex places in the paper, even though it was Harry's doing. Alex, however, confronts Fiona about the engagement and she takes off.
141	3	"Kiss of Death"	Arnie Custo	Sally Webb	1 March 2006	N/A
Stevie tries to compensate for not having Alex by hooking up with a younger guy, Leo. Leo takes a liking to Stevie, but Stevie takes it as a one-night stand and rejects his continuous gestures. Leo does not take Stevie's rejection well and seeks revenge by spraying on Drover's land, which threatens Drover's organic status and breaks Tess' heart. Meanwhile, Rob learns of his father's death and it brings him close to Jodi, with him revealing his secret to her. Elsewhere, Moira lands on hard times and Terry steps in to seek Moira a place to live- on Drover's. And, Sandra is threatened by Fiona's arrival on Killarney.
142	4	"Luck be a Lady"	Richard Jasek	Rick Held	8 March 2006	N/A
With the bank threatening foreclosure on Drover's, Tess tries everything to keep the farm viable. When Stevie takes getting money into her own hands, she ends up losing thousands in a poker game and tries to fix the issue by concocting a plan with the same guy she lost to poker with, who happens to be a buyer. Meanwhile, Sandra gets wind of a sale Drover's is making and undercuts it by offer a rock bottom price, hoping this will make Harry happy and he will have her attention again since Fiona's arrival. Harry's reaction is more severe than Sandra anticipated.
143	5	"The Real McLeod"	Declan Eames	Chris Hawkshaw	29 March 2006	1.30
Tess offers Jodi half her shares of Drover's since she is a McLeod. Jodi, trying to prove herself, goes to great lengths to get their "Gungellan Fresh" natural beef concept on the council's agenda, as well as their support. Meanwhile, Leo, Stevie's young one-night stand, returns after his name is tarnished for dusting Drover's land. When Harry's prize bull is found dead from poisoning, Harry suspects Leo. Elsewhere, Moira can't get the Drover's women to let her do her share for letting her stay on at Drover's.
144	6	"The Calling"	Declan Eames	Fin Edquist	5 April 2006	N/A
Moira begins questioning her psychic abilities after it gets her in trouble, but a continuous premonition related to Nick and Tess has her intrigued. Meanwhile, Jodi helps Fiona with her mustering skills and Fiona's amateur abilities lets a cow loose and Tess in danger. A stranger in town, Greg, ends up saving Tess' life, even after Tess seemed to push him away. Elsewhere, Kate trips and Dave goes to great lengths to get Kate to go see a doctor. And, Tess gets a phone call that will change her life.
145	7	"What Lies Beneath"	Grant Brown	Tracey Trinder	26 April 2006	N/A
Nick's return causes excitement for Tess, but Nick is overwhelmed by what everyone thinks is a miracle, when he is privately trying to figure out what happened to him since he has no memory of his attack. Meanwhile, Jodi follows Kate to the city after she discovers Kate lied to her about where she was going. Jodi's investigation leads her to Kate at a clinic so she can have melanoma removed, hoping she will be cancer free.
146	8	"Where the Heart Is"	Grant Brown	Margaret Wilson	3 May 2006	N/A
Nick is feeling unhappy about being back home and is still interested in his job in Argentina, doing work with his partner on the side. Tess accuses Nick of wanting that life back, and in the end decides she wants him to be happy and she is happy with him where his dreams are. Meanwhile, Phoenix is agitated by the return of the brumbies she was taken from, and when Phoenix escapes to them, she sees it as a sign. Elsewhere, a journalist, Tom Braiden, wanting a story on Nick soon changes courses focusing on Jodi. When Jodi discovers that Tom calls Rob by the name "Matt", she knows the journalist has outed Rob and the two escape from Tom together. And, everyone says goodbye as Nick and Tess fly away back to Argentina. Final appearance of Bridie Carter as Tess Silverman McLeod and Myles Pollard as Nick Ryan
147	9	"Deliver Us from Evil"	Richard Jasek	Nick Stevens	10 May 2006	N/A
Jodi and Rob continue to flee from the hitman Tom. Jodi thinks fast to get the two out of danger, especially after Rob is hit when Tom starts shooting towards them. After they make it to safety at Drover's, Jodi discovers that Tom has also made his way back to the farm and Stevie helps save Jodi, Rob, and Kate's life from the hitman. Meanwhile, Jodi secretly sets Terry and Meg up together and it leads to a night of remembering and rekindling, leading to Meg proposing to Terry. And, Patrick returns with a handful of goats that Drover's agrees to look after.
148	10	"The Big Commitment"	Richard Jasek	Chris Hawkshaw	17 May 2006	N/A
Stevie and Fiona are roped into horse shopping together, but the two spark up a new respect for each other when the horse dealer scams them by dropping the price, and substituting a look alike horse. Meanwhile, Meg is having writer's block while Jodi gets Rob off her mind and puts together the wedding. Elsewhere, an accident leaves Patrick temporarily blinded, and Kate steps in to help him. And, after the wedding, everyone says goodbye as Meg and Terry set off for an adventure of their own across Australia.
149	11	"Biting the Bullet"	Arnie Custo	Sarah Duffy	31 May 2006	N/A
Regan returns to Drover's, shocking Stevie, Kate, and Jodi, but she is hiding a secret from everyone. Regan confides in Jodi that there was an accident at her mining site, and it killed two men on her watch. Kate isn't Regans's biggest fan, while Stevie is more concerned with Jodi's lack of leadership and decision making now that she is a McLeod and part owner of Drover's. Meanwhile, Alex is watching Charlotte for the weekend, giving the couple an idea of what it would be like if they have children. Fiona, however, discovers that she is infertile, but decides to keep this from Alex. Elsewhere, Patrick tries training a farm dog that is untrainable.
150	12	"Second Best"	Arnie Custo	Sally Webb	7 June 2006	N/A
Alex asks Stevie to be his "best man" since Nick may not be able to make it back for the wedding. The last thing Stevie wants to do is be his best man, but she agrees, until the tables turn and Alex offers Stevie up as a bridesmaid for Fiona, believing that would make more sense. Stevie, meanwhile, also tries to get Harry to allow Rose work experience on Killarney, but he declines. Elsewhere, The Colonel (Harry's prized ram) is stolen by a young teen whose family is on rough times. Harry, meanwhile, is still receiving death threats, to which he is still eyeing Leo for. And, Sandra gets a shock when Harry serves her with divorce papers.
151	13	"The Trouble with Harry"	Steve Jodrell	Elizabeth Coleman	14 June 2006	N/A
Jodi is involved in a car accident when she takes her eyes off the road for a second and she hits a car driving toward her on the wrong side of the road. Jodi escapes the accident, only to discover the other car was being driven by Harry, and he does not survive. When Alex discovers the news he takes it hard, hoping his father is still alive as Nick was, and running to Stevie for comfort as opposed to Fiona. In the midst of the accident, a Japanese trade delegation visits Drover's to make an export deal on "Gungallen Fresh", but the accident and its aftermath trample of the effect the women want to happen with the delegation. The delegation's translator, and wife of one of the members, gets some advice from Stevie, and it leads to a positive outcome for the women at Drover's.
152	14	"The Legend of Harry Ryan"	Richard Jasek	Rick Held	21 June 2006	N/A
Alex finds it difficult to compose a eulogy for Harry's funeral. When Alex stumbles upon a box containing a boxing medal with the name "Karl Weatherdon" on it he springs into an investigation that leads him to something about Harry's past. Meanwhile, all three "Mrs. Ryan's"- Fiona, Sandra, and Liz, are stuck together while Alex looks into Harry's past. Elsewhere, Stevie holds in the fact that she had an argument with Harry right before Harry's accident and that may have caused his heart attack. And, Jodi can't stand that Kate and Regan are still not getting along.
153	15	"Second Chances"	Steve Jodrell	Tracey Trinder	12 July 2006	N/A
Kevin returns to Drover's wanting to be back in his daughter's life. He takes the news positively that Jodi is Jack McLeod's daughter, not his. He decides to stick around to be near Jodi after a business venture falls through. Against Stevie and Kate's advice, Jodie offers Kevin money, but soon finds out that Kevin already knew he wasn't her father, and he was using her for her inheritance. Elsewhere, Fiona's mother arrives for the wedding while Fiona becomes jealous of Stevie and Alex's relationship, especially after Alex pitches in to help the girls shear 500 sheep overnight to meet a deadline. Fiona questions if Alex still wants to marry her and then tells him she is pregnant.
154	16	"Secrets and Lies"	Richard Jasek	Margaret Wilson	19 July 2006	N/A
It's time for the wedding and Fiona is on edge, especially after she falls off a horse and Stevie soon realizes she is faking the pregnancy. Meanwhile, Dave tries to get dancing lessons before the reception and Kate doesn't know if going to the wedding with Patrick is a good idea. Kate has more to worry about though after she tries on Fiona's dress and gets a stain on it, causing her and Jodi to fix it quickly and quietly. Stevie confronts Fiona before the wedding about telling Alex the truth, but Fiona gets ahead of her and she and Alex elope before the reception, and Stevie is too late to stop anything.
155	17	"The Life of Riley"	Arnie Custo	Fin Edquist	26 July 2006	N/A
After brumbies are found shot and dead, Jodi and Stevie suspect a Riley, a new stranger in town. The two soon discover that Riley is doing the opposite and trying to save the brumbies from danger. Meanwhile, Sandra takes over Killarney with Alex away and tries to continue Harry's vision. In doing so, she is going to sell Alex's prized cattle and Drover's tries stopping Sandra's rampage. Elsewhere, Moira learns that Sandra's rampage includes possibly selling the truck stop, so she looks into a lucrative fuel-carting contract, with Regan backing her.
156	18	"Wild Horses"	Declan Eames	Mardi McConnochie	2 August 2006	N/A
Stevie and Riley clash over their horse training endeavor when Riley objects to Stevie's heard-headed approach. He reveals he is a horse-gentler, not a horse-breaker, when the two have a limited amount of time to break in a horse. Meanwhile, Regan's lack of riding has her purchasing a quad to replace a horse so she can feel more useful and be more productive on the farm. An accident with the quad gives her the push to try out Oscar. Elsewhere, Patrick needs to pass an exam to help Moira with her new business venture. And, Fiona arrives back to Killarney solo since Alex is visiting with Nick and Tess, and she discovers Sandra knows her pregnancy secret, but Fiona discovers her own leverage over Sandra soon enough.
157	19	"The Great Temptation"	Declan Eames	Dave Warner	9 August 2006	N/A
Moira's husband, Hugh, returns to win Moira back. She, however, is not as easily inclined to take him back. Meanwhile, Regan feels more confident as a rider, but accidentally musters cattle into the wrong paddock and they end up at Killarney. Regan feels like she has let Drover's down, but she soon discovers Sandra pulled one over on them after Dave diagnoses the cattle with paratyphoid. Drover's loses a sale over the incident, so Jodi puts more pressure on winning the country challenge, so she drops Regan for Stevie so they are guaranteed a win. And, news comes that Tess has had a baby girl.
158	20	"Suspicious Minds"	Arnie Custo	Nick Stevens	16 August 2006	N/A
Patrick and Kate have a night of passion planned, but Kate becomes obsessed with Harry's death after she finds the death threats in Stevie's drawer. Kate soon believes Stevie could have killed Harry when evidence starts connecting Stevie to the incident including a video of Stevie and Harry fighting, Harry's heart medication in Stevie's car, and a canteen with the medicine dissolved in it in the car. Stevie makes it know she is being set up, but Kate takes the situation into her own hands and calls the police. Elsewhere, Stevie has to deal with Riley's belief that Ken Redford is abusing his horses.
159	21	"Days of Reckoning"	Steve Jodrell	Samantha Winston	23 August 2006	N/A
Alex returns from Argentina to learn that Sandra has been barking orders and changing things during his absence, and that Stevie is the prime suspect in Harry's murder. Fiona, guilty and still being blackmailed by the deal with Sandra, tells Alex that she has had a miscarriage. Meanwhile, Kate is getting the cold shoulder from the Drover's team after she called the police about Stevie, and she is soon realizing she has made a mistake. Stevie, however, is concerned for her innocence and works with a lawyer to try and win her case.
160	22	"Scratch the Surface"	Steve Jodrell	Blake Ayshford	20 September 2006	N/A
When Leo returns to town, Stevie is adamant that he killed Harry. She and the others go to great lengths to find evidence against Leo, including sneaking into Leo's place and having Regan flirt with Leo to get a confession. Things go too far when Leo finds out Stevie has been snooping around and she loses control with him. Meanwhile, Alex learns that Fiona lied about the pregnancy and that Sandra has been blackmailing her. Alex kicks Sandra off Killarney for good, while still reeling with the revelation of Fiona's lie.
161	23	"For Better or Worse"	Richard Jasek	Rick Held	27 September 2006	1.23
Jodi begins contemplating the idea of hiring another farm hand for the possibility that Stevie will be away, but Kate doesn't seem to agree with Jodi's decision. Meanwhile, Fiona pulls string to get Stevie a top QC to represent her. Fiona, however, lies to Alex by telling him the QC is doing the work free of charge, when in reality her father pulled some strings. Alex is still trying to figure out their current relationship, while battling with his and Stevie's almost kiss, where Fiona is dedicated to making things work. Elsewhere, Moira gets in a bind when she takes a short cut for a delivery and ends up stuck with a dangerous fuel spill and Riley gives her a hand, even though the two have been at odds with each other all day.
162	24	"The Eleventh Hour"	Richard Jasek	Margaret Wilson	4 October 2006	1.21
Fiona joins the CFS to integrate herself more into the community, while Alex isn't as driven to push their relationship. On her first day Fiona helps Jodi put out a fire at Kinsella's that Sandra started before she left. Meanwhile, Stevie's trial date has been moved up and she frantically ties up loose ends. An arriving storm on the eve before her trial brings Stevie face to face with Sandra at Harry's grave, and a big confession arises.
163	25	"Old Wrongs"	Steve Jodrell	Sally Webb & Sarah Duffy	11 October 2006	1.15
Rose is coming to Drover's for a visit and work experience. Stevie is excited since she hasn't seen Rose since the truth came out, but the two still don't seem to see eye-to-eye. Rose is still hurting over the lie. Stevie is also reveling in the kiss she and Alex shared, even though she doesn't know what it means for the two of them. Meanwhile, Jodi looks through the McLeod's past after Phil Rakich makes an all-male affair for the Gungellan 150th anniversary celebration. Jodi wants it to be known women have been just as much a factor as men have in the history and successes of Gungellan.
164	26	"Handle with Care"	Steve Jodrell	James Walker	18 October 2006	1.14
Rose begins seeing Leo secretly, not knowing all the facts about him and Stevie. Stevie overreacts at first about the secretive boy, but she takes a less overbearing approach for Rose's sake. Meanwhile, Jodi, Kate, Alex, and Riley go out on a muster than ends up being an overnight. Even though Jodi and Riley spar with each other during the time, she begins learning more about him. Elsewhere, Regan anticipates a proposal from Dave, and when no proposal comes she brings the subject up and Dave laughs it off, making Regan disappointed.
165	27	"Guess Who's Coming to Dinner?"	Andrew Prowse	Sarah Duffy & Chris McCourt	25 October 2006	1.15
Everyone anticipates dinner with Rose's mystery boyfriend, but everyone is horrified when they discover it is Leo. The women try to be supportive and go along with the situation, but Stevie still doesn't trust Leo and kicks him out. Regan and Stevie come to Rose's aide when things with Leo go too far and she is put in danger. Meanwhile, Fiona presses Alex to make a decision about spending Christmas with her family, but his mind is still on Stevie. Elsewhere, Kate wants to apply for the Young Farmer of the Year award, but she drops out when she finds out Jodi entered.
166	28	"One Perfect Day"	Andrew Prowse	Alexa Wyatt	1 November 2006	1.17
Jodi introduces Boer goats into Drover's Run and Gungellan Fresh Meats, but Phil Rakich is against this decision. Riley decides to play a joke on Phil to humiliate him by stealing his prized bull, Fabio, but Jodi does not find this amusing and the two must go track the bull down. Meanwhile, Stevie and Rose go dress shopping before Rose heads home. Stevie is less than thrilled by the time it takes, but at the same time she enjoys every minute with Rose. Stevie has an awkward encounter with Alex and Fiona when the two meet her and Rose in town after going to a fertility specialist. Dave and Regan decide to move in together, but they soon have to reconsider if that is really what they want.
167	29	"Winners and Losers"	Declan Eames	Tracey Trinder	8 November 2006	1.21
After Alex returns from the city he promises Stevie he will end things with Fiona. Alex confronts Fiona and she lashes out by taking his bike and getting into an accident, leaving Alex standing Stevie up. He leaves her a message on the phone that she never gets. Stevie feels used and ends up having a night out with Drew Cornwall, who Drover's Run is going back and forth with to make a sale. Alex sees the two of them together. Meanwhile, Patrick and Jodi argue over who knows Kate better, so Kate makes up a quiz to see. Dave discovers the quiz and makes a few adjustments to Patrick's answers.
168	30	"Damage Control"	Declan Eames	Jane Allen	15 November 2006	1.15
Jodi begins having recurring nightmares about Rob and their flight from the hitman Tom. When she and Riley have to put a brumby down, this continues to bring back memories of being with Rob. Meanwhile, Stevie discovers Alex's message and thinks there is still hope for them, until Alex rejects her based on what he saw the night before. When Fiona returns to Killarney following the accident she makes a dramatic exit. Elsewhere, Kate is shortlisted for the Young Farmer's Award and Patrick uses Dave's ideas as his own to help Kate with her speech.
169	31	"Risk"	Arnie Custo	Chris McCourt & Margaret Wilson	22 November 2006	1.25
Dave is offered a research job in Africa, but decides against taking it. Patrick thinks he is declining because of him. Patrick, however, has more on his mind when he soon realizes he doesn't know Kate as well as he thinks, and more importantly— he doesn't know Kate as well as Dave does. Kate attends the Young Farmers Award ceremony, nervous about her speech, but soon finds comfort in someone she has always loved. Elsewhere, Stevie and Alex are at war with each other and Alex wants to back out of a deal with Drover's Run, so he can have land to raise more sheep in a lucrative deal with Phil Rakich. Stevie is furious.
170	32	"Twenty Questions"	Arnie Custo	Chris Hawkshaw	29 November 2006	1.41
In the sixth season finale, Dave's decision to go to Africa awakens old feelings for Kate. Jodi challenges Kate to open those feelings up and be honest with Dave. She continually has daydreams about Dave, but doesn't want to interfere with his plans. Meanwhile, a stalker has been on Drover's Run, smashing Stevie's car window and slashing her tires. The women soon meet a stranger who helps them and is looking for a job, but quickly turns against them after Stevie has an altercation with Fiona. Regan soon finds out the strange women's agenda. Elsewhere, Fiona's return includes trying to get half of Killarney. Alex calls his blood father Bryce to help him work out a divorce. Bryce's advice includes him putting up a lot of money and becoming a silent investor in Killarney. Riley wants to join the CFS and Jodi is not on board until the two have a moment together to bring back an escaped brumby. Jodi however is yet unaware of a returning face.

== Reception ==
=== Ratings ===
On average, the sixth season of McLeod's Daughters was watched by 1.31 million viewers, down 40,000 from the previous season. It was the 2nd most-watched Australian drama of 2006, behind All Saints, and ranked at #5 for its sixth season.

=== Awards and nominations ===
The sixth season of McLeod's Daughters received two wins and five nominations at the 2007 Logie Awards. It also received one nomination at the 2006 AFI Awards.

Wins

- Logie Award for Most Popular Actor (Aaron Jeffery)
- Logie Award for Most Popular New Male Talent (Dustin Clare)

Nominations

- AFI Award for Best Television Drama Series
- Gold Logie Award for Most Popular Personality on Australian Television (Simmone Jade Mackinnon)
- Logie Award for Most Popular Actress (Rachael Carpani)
- Logie Award for Most Popular Actress (Simmone Jade Mackinnon)
- Logie Award for Most Popular New Female Talent (Michelle Langstone)
- Logie Award for Most Popular Drama Series

== Home media ==
Title	Release	Region	Format	Ref(s)
McLeod's Daughters: The Complete Sixth Series	11 April 2007	Australia – R4	DVD	
McLeod's Daughters: The Complete Sixth Season	10 June 2008	USA – R1	DVD	
McLeod's Töchter: Die Komplette Sechste Staffel	22 March 2013	Germany – R2	DVD	
