= Streetsmartz =

Australian television series

- Starring: David Richardson; Fernando Colella; Lucy Cooke
- Country of origin: Australia
- No. of series: 3
- No. of episodes: 39

Original release
- Network: Nine Network
- Release: 2005 – 2006

Streetsmartz is an Australian television series. It is centred on the lives of a group of children, their friends and family who live in Fremantle, Western Australia. Three series, with a total of 39 episodes, were screened in 2005 and 2006 on the Nine Network.

== Cast ==
- David Richardson as Vincenzo (Vinnie) Martino
- Fernando Colella as Joey Dunlop
- Lucy Cooke as Philippa (Pip) Holmes
- Anthony Harwood as Rick Martino
- Pia Prendiville as Hellie Connors
- Joel Turner as Stavros Papadopoulos
- Chelsea Jones as Giuseppina (Jess) Martino
- Valentina Barron as Samantha (Sammi) Martino
- Iain Gately as George Brady
- Rebecca McCarthy as Maxine (Max) Malesovic

Also:

- Cle Wootton as Sari the snake charmer
- John Bannister as Tom the muso
- Heath Bergerson as Luke the didgeridoo player
- Gavan Ellis as Bruce Hopkins
- Luciano Vecchio as Carlo Martino
- Robbie Vecchio as Franco Martino
- Monica Main as Aunt Rosa
- Kerry-Ella McAullay as Aunt Sophia
- Jay Walsh as Papa Graziano
- Yeung-Ming Tan as Van
- Anthony Spanos as Hector Papadopoulos
- Ben Garside as Radovan (Rad) Malesovic
- Vivienne Garrett

== See also ==
- List of Australian television series
