= Caroline Brazier =

Australian actress

- Born: Perth, Western Australia, Australia
- Occupation: Actress
- Years active: 2000–present

Caroline Brazier is an Australian actress who is best known for the role of Chrissy Merchant in Packed to the Rafters and the starring roles of Veronica Johnson and her twin sister Betti in the children's television series Parallax. Brazier has also had a number of roles in the theatre, films and other television series.

== Early life ==
Originally from Perth, Western Australia, Brazier graduated from the National Institute of Dramatic Art (NIDA) in 1998. As a child she briefly lived in Jakarta.

== Career ==
Brazier has appeared in The Merchant of Venice, Julius Caesar and Antony and Cleopatra for the Bell Shakespeare Company, Whale Music at Darlinghurst Theatre, and Speed-the-Plow for Perth Theatre Company. In 2012 she won Best Actress in a Leading Role in an Independent Production at the Sydney Theatre Awards for I Want to Sleep with Tom Stoppard.

She also played the Superintendent in Accidental Death of an Anarchist (2018) at Sydney Theatre and appeared in the music video for Silverchair's 1999 song "Emotion Sickness".

In 2023, Brazier was named as part of the extended cast for the second series of Foxtel legal drama The Twelve. In 2024, Brazier was named in season 2 of Scrublands.

== Personal life ==
Brazier was married to fellow Australian actor Geoff Morrell.

In between acting engagements, Brazier often heads home to spend time with her parents in Perth. She became fluent in Indonesian, from living in Jakarta as a child. She used it recently in Rake Season 3 Episode 7

== Filmography ==
=== Film ===
Year	Title	Role	Notes
2007	Rogue	Mary Ellen	
2011	Cupid	Venus	Short
2013	Stick	Woman / Apparition	Short
2014	Kharisma	Karen	Short
2014	Morning Frost	Sue	Short
2016	Pulse	Jacqui	
2017	Three Summers	Olivia	
2022	Blacklight	The boss	

=== Television ===
Year	Title	Role	Notes
2000	Above the Law	Carla Benning	"Moving on Up"
2000	Home and Away	Alicia Campbell	Recurring role
2001	South Pacific	Rose	TV film
2001	Water Rats	Heather Pinchon	"The Marrying Kind"
2001	TwentyfourSeven	Georgia Leighton-Smith	"It's My Life"
2002	Young Lions	Gabrielle Hall	"Boy School Bullies"
2003	White Collar Blue	Sonia Parry	"2.13"
2004	Parallax	Veronica Johnson / Betti	Main role
2007	City Homicide	Frances Deerborne	"Family Planning"
2008–09	Packed to the Rafters	Chrissey Merchant	Recurring role
2009	30 Seconds	Kirsty	"Good Clown Bad Clown"
2009	Legend of the Seeker	Miss Crantan / Mistress Nathair	"Broken"
2010–18	Rake	Wendy Greene	39 episodes
2011	Wild Boys	Catherine Bell	Regular role
2011	Terra Nova	Deborah Tate	Recurring role
2012	Dripping in Chocolate	Marion Verger	TV film
2012	Miss Fisher's Murder Mysteries	Hetty	"Death by Miss Adventure"
2015–16	Home and Away	Carol Peters	Recurring role
2016	Deep Water	Tina Toohey	TV miniseries
2017	Offspring	Shanti	2 episodes
2018	Tidelands	Rosa	8 episodes
2019	Reef Break	Stefania Kivini	1 episode
2021	Wakefield	Leyla Matos	2 episodes
2022	Troppo	Joanna	4 episodes
2022	Joe vs. Carole	Elizabeth Huntley	2 episodes
2022	Mystery Road: Origin	Geraldine	6 episodes
2023	Year Of	Ophelia Kellaway	5 episodes
2023	Wolf Like Me	Principal	1 episode
2024	The Twelve	Amethyst Walker	4 episodes
2025	Scrublands: Silver	Jennifer 'Jay Jay' Hayes	TV series:4 episodes
2025	Ten Pound Poms	Carmel	TV series: 2 episodes

=== Music videos ===
Year	Artist	Song	Notes
1999	Silverchair	"Emotion Sickness"	

== Theatre ==
Year	Title	Role	Notes
1996	Too Young for Ghosts	Ruth	NIDA Parade Rehearsal Rooms, Sydney
1996	The Song Room		NIDA Parade Theatre, Sydney
1997	Chekhov in Yalta		NIDA Parade Theatre, Sydney
1997	Nicholas Nickleby		NIDA Parade Theatre, Sydney
1998	The Curse of the House of Atreus	Helen	NIDA Parade Theatre, Sydney
1998	Les Liaisons Dangereuses	Madame de Rosemonde	NIDA Parade Theatre, Sydney
1999	The Merchant of Venice	Nerissa	Australian tour with Bell Shakespeare
2001	Julius Caesar	Calpurnia	Australian tour with Bell Shakespeare
2001	Antony and Cleopatra	Charmian	Australian tour with Bell Shakespeare
2002	Whale Music		Darlinghurst Theatre, Sydney with White Wave Productions
2004	A Moment on the Lips	Jenny	Trades Hall, Melbourne with Maelstrom Productions
2004	Much Ado About Nothing		Kings Park, Western Australia with Deckchair Theatre
2005	Two Brothers	Jamie Savage	Australian tour with STC & MTC
2006	Ray's Tempest	Isabel	Fairfax Studio, Melbourne with MTC
2006	The Emotional Anatomy of a Relationship Breakdown		Fairfax Studio, Melbourne with Fascination Street Productions for Short+Sweet
2007	Europe		La Mama, Melbourne
2007	Enlightenment	Joanna	Fairfax Studio, Melbourne with MTC
2007	Don's Party	Kerry	Sydney Opera House with STC & MTC
2009	Speed-the-Plow		Perth Theatre Company
2009	The True Story of Butterfish	Kate	Brisbane Powerhouse for Brisbane Festival
2010	Bang		Belvoir St Theatre, Sydney
2013	Liberty Equality Fraternity	Orlagh	Ensemble Theatre, Sydney
2013; 2014	The Removalists	Kate Mason	Bondi Pavilion, Sydney, Brisbane Powerhouse with Tamarama Rock Surfers
2014	Gasp!	Kirsten	Heath Ledger Theatre, Perth, Playhouse, Brisbane with QTC & Black Swan State Theatre Company
2016	The Literati	Philomena	Stables Theatre, Sydney with Griffin Theatre Company & Bell Shakespeare
2017	Dinner	Paige	Sydney Opera House with STC
2018	Accidental Death of an Anarchist	The Superintendent	Sydney Opera House with STC
2019	Mary Stuart	Mary Stuart	Roslyn Packer Theatre, Sydney with STC
2020	Liberty, Equality, Fraternity	Orlagh	Online with Ensemble Theatre
2023	Things I Know to Be True	Fran	Heath Ledger Theatre, Perth with Black Swan State Theatre Company
2024	The Children	Rose	Heath Ledger Theatre, Perth with Black Swan State Theatre Company

== Awards ==
Year	Work	Award	Category	Result
2011	Rake	Equity Ensemble Awards	Outstanding Performance by an Ensemble in a Drama Series	Won
2012	I Want to Sleep with Tom Stoppard	Sydney Theatre Awards	Best Actress in a Leading Role in an Independent Production	Won
2013	Rake	Equity Ensemble Awards	Outstanding Performance by an Ensemble in a Drama Series	Nominated
2016	Rake (episode 8)	AACTA Awards	Best Guest or Supporting Actress in a Television Drama	Nominated
2018	Rake	AACTA Awards	Best Guest or Supporting Actress in a Television Drama	Nominated
2023	Mystery Road: Origin	Equity Ensemble Awards	Outstanding Performance by an Ensemble in a Drama Series	Won
2024	Things I Know to Be True	Performing Arts WA Awards	Outstanding Performer in a Leading Role	Won
