= Heath Miller (actor) =

Australian actor

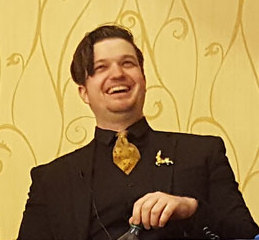
Miller at Readercon in 2016

Heath Miller is an Australian actor. His first job was as a thirteen year old on the TV series Ship to Shore, appearing in the first two series. He has appeared on stage in multiple productions such as Romeo in Romeo and Juliet for Deckchair Theatre's Sheakespear in the Park at Kings Park, WA, in Thieving Boy for Fly On The Wall Theatre, in X-Stacy for the Black Swan Theatre Company, and Sex, Drugs and Self-Control at Rechabite Hall, Perth He has narrated audio books such as Space Opera which won the AudioFile Earphones Award in 2018 for Best Audiobook.
