= Felicity Milovanovich =

New Zealand actress, DJ and music producer

- Born: 5 July 1992 (age 33); New Zealand
- Other name: Misfits of Zion
- Occupations: Actress, DJ, music producer

Felicity Milovanovich (born 5 July 1992) is a New Zealand actress, DJ and music producer. She is best known for her roles as Jen in The Killian Curse, Zora in The New Tomorrow and Carmen in Time Trackers. She currently works as a DJ under the name Misfits of Zion.

== Credits ==
=== Short film ===
- Shelley (2007) as Shelley

=== Television ===
- The New Tomorrow (2005) as Zora
- The Killian Curse (2006–2008) as Jen
- Time Trackers (2008) as Carmen

=== Theatre ===
- The Lovely Bones previs work (2007) as Lindsey
- The Crucible (2007) as Betty
- Titus Andronicus (2009) as Young Lucius

== Training ==
- Theatre Long Cloud Youth Theatre, Willem Wassenaar (2008–2010)
- American Accent Course at Actors Centre Australia, Jamie Irvine (2011)
