= Outsiders (American TV series) =

American television drama series

- Genre: Drama
- Created by: Peter Mattei
- Starring: David Morse; Joe Anderson; Gillian Alexy; Ryan Hurst; Kyle Gallner; Christina Jackson; Thomas M. Wright
- Theme music composer: Morgan O'Kane
- Composers: Dhani Harrison; Paul Hicks
- Country of origin: United States
- Original language: English
- No. of seasons: 2
- No. of episodes: 26

Production
- Executive producers: Adam Bernstein; Dan Carey; Paul Giamatti; Michael Wimer; Peter Tolan; Peter Mattei
- Producer: Larry Rapaport
- Production locations: Pittsburgh, Pennsylvania; West Newton, Pennsylvania
- Cinematography: Jamie Reynoso; Scott Peck
- Editors: Daniel Gabbe; Howard Leder; Matthew V. Colonna
- Camera setup: Single-camera
- Running time: 42–50 minutes
- Production companies: Famous Horses; Fedora Entertainment; Touchy Feely Films; Tribune Studios; Sony Pictures Television

Original release
- Network: WGN America
- Release: January 26, 2016 – April 25, 2017

Outsiders is an American television drama series created by Peter Mattei. Set in the fictional town of Blackburg in Crockett County, Kentucky, the series tells the story of the Farrell clan and their struggle for power and control in the hills of Appalachia.

It is WGN America's third original series, which debuted on January 26, 2016. On March 11, 2016, WGN America renewed Outsiders for a second season which premiered on January 24, 2017. On April 14, 2017, WGN America announced that the series had been canceled after two seasons, with the then-forthcoming last episode of the second season serving as the series finale.

== Synopsis ==
Set in the Appalachian Mountains of Kentucky, the series revolves around the interaction of a group of mountain folk known as the Farrell clan and the locals in the nearby town of Blackburg, Kentucky.

The Farrells are an isolationist group who shun normal society and live a spartan existence in the woods. Extremely paranoid of outsiders, the Farrells have lived on Shay Mountain for over 200 years. The mountain is now coveted by a national mining outfit for its coal deposits.

At the start of the series, Asa Farrell, a cousin of the ruling family, returns to the mountain after leaving a decade prior in order to experience life in normal society. His arrival coincides with the family matriarch Lady Ray Farrell announcing her intention to cede power to her son, "Big Foster" Farrell. Big Foster, who never forgave Asa for leaving his family, has Asa imprisoned in a cage for six months until he is freed due to his ability to read after an eviction notice is posted at the entrance of the mountain.

In town, the mining company has gained approval to evict the Farrell family from the mountain and seeks to expedite the process so mining operations can begin as soon as possible. Deputy Sheriff Wade Houghton is assigned the task to carry out the eviction process. However, Houghton suffers from alcoholism, opiate addiction, and PTSD due to previous encounters with the Farrell family and the death of his wife. Houghton attempts to warn his superiors that any sort of eviction process will be bloody, result in loss of life on both sides, and will eventually devolve into a lengthy siege with the Farrells holding the advantage through their extensive knowledge of the mountains.

The eviction leads to a power struggle, as Lady Ray believes that the impending eviction is the apocalyptic event foretold in a family prophecy. Because of this, she pardons Asa, freeing him from the cage, and announces a delay in turning over authority to her son. She continues to refuse to change her mind when Big Foster, upset at being denied power, arranges a raid in town of a local gun owner that goes badly and costs the life of Big Foster's youngest son.

== Cast and characters ==
=== Main ===
- David Morse as "Big Foster" Farrell VI, the most powerful man on the mountain, and next in line to be Bren'in, the Farrells' leader. When denied his right of ascension, Farrell takes dangerous action to secure his power and to try to eliminate Asa, whom he considers to be a traitor to his family.
- Joe Anderson as Asa Farrell, Big Foster's cousin, who left Shay Mountain and returns home after a ten-year absence. He was once in love with Lil Foster's lover G'Win, which creates tension as she attempts to help reintegrate him into the tribe.
- Gillian Alexy as G'Winveer "G'Win" Farrell, Asa's third cousin and former lover. Currently involved with "Lil Foster", but seeks to help her former lover return to the family. Had a child who is now deceased with 'Lil' Foster.
- Ryan Hurst as "Lil Foster" Farrell VIII, Big Foster's eldest son and enforcer and current boyfriend of G'Win who's also his third cousin.
- Kyle Gallner as Hasil Farrell, Asa's fourth cousin, who was maimed by Big Foster after he stole some of the family's wine/moonshine to sell to a drug dealer, who bought him a drink when he snuck into town one night. Having lived most of his life on the mountain, Hasil wishes to know more about the civilized world, much to Big Foster's anger and dismay. He's fallen in love with Sally-Ann, a black resident of Blackburg.
- Christina Jackson as Sally-Ann, one of the few African-American residents in Blackburg. Sally-Ann strikes up a relationship with Hasil, much to the anger of her brother, who does not want his sister to associate with a white man.
- Thomas M. Wright as Deputy Sheriff Wade Houghton, Jr. A fifth-generation Houghton to live in Blackburg, second-in-command of the local sheriff's department, and a single father, Houghton is given the assignment of evicting the Farrells from their mountain fortress, a task he fears due to a past encounter his father, a coal company line boss, had with the Farrells that Wade believed caused his father's death. This incident led to Wade developing a great fear of the mountain clan. Suffers from PTSD and alcoholism, and takes unprescribed pills as a result of said encounter.

=== Recurring ===
- Phyllis Somerville as Lady Ray Farrell, Big Foster's mother and the former Bren'in. Believed by the members of her clan to have special abilities.
- Jason McCune as Ned Osborn
- Francie Swift as Haylie Grimes
- Mark Jeffrey Miller as Craigan "Krake" O'Farrell, runner of the still and maker of Farrell Wine
- Eddie Beveridge as Phil'up Farrell
- Keith Michael Gregory as Jake Murphy
- Johanna McGinley as Annalivia Farrell, the caretaker to the Lady Bren'in.
- Barret Hackney as Butch the town drug dealer
- Jackson Frazer as Caleb Houghton, young son of Sheriff Wade Houghton
- Kendall Yeaman as Phelia Farrell, the eyes and ears of the Farrell Clan

== Production ==
The series, first titled Titans, was created by playwright Peter Mattei, and produced by Peter Tolan and Paul Giamatti for Sony Pictures Television and Tribune Studios. WGN America announced a 13-episode straight-to-series order in August 2014. Production began in the Pittsburgh metropolitan area on May 5, 2015 and ran through September. Mountaintop exteriors were filmed in Henry Kaufmann Family Park in Monroeville, Pennsylvania, while interiors were constructed at 31st Street Studios in the Strip District. Scenes in Blackburg, Kentucky, the fictional town at the base of the mountain, were filmed in Millvale. WGN America renewed the series for a second season. Production resumed in mid-2016 using the same locations around Pittsburgh.

Music performed by Ben Miller Band

== Series overview ==
Season	Episodes	Originally released	
Season	Episodes	First released	Last released
1	13	January 26, 2016	April 19, 2016
2	13	January 24, 2017	April 25, 2017

== Episodes ==
=== Season 1 (2016) ===
No. overall	No. in season	Title	Directed by	Written by	Original release date	US viewers (millions)
1	1	"Farrell Wine"	Adam Bernstein	Peter Mattei	January 26, 2016	1.055
After abandoning his clan for several years, Asa Farrell returns to his childhood mountain dwelling. As a result of his actions, his fellow clans people ostracize him by locking him in a cage for several months. Asa is later released from his holding cell, at which point he realizes his people are in need of help. A multinational coal company is seeking to vacate the Farrel family from their longtime mountain home in order to tap into the mountains vast coal deposits. Big Foster does not trust Asa after Lady Ray, the clan's leader (or 'Bren'in'), has a vision of Asa saving the clan. Big Foster then decides that he must get rid of Asa by any means necessary, as Big Foster sees himself as the true leader of his people.
2	2	"Doomsayer"	Adam Bernstein	Peter Mattei	February 2, 2016	0.840
Big Foster calls in an assembly to banish Asa, as he blames him for bringing the misfortune that lead to the death of his son. Asa does not want to go back to the outside world after completing his incarceration, and claims that they need his literacy and outside views to fight against upcoming eviction. The clan decides on a pit fight between Asa and Lil' Foster, which Asa unexpectedly wins. Wade, the county sheriff, is sent to investigate on the origin of the Farrell moonshine, to help change the public opinion against the Farrells and secure his re-election. He eventually destroys the evidence that he finds.
3	3	"Messengers"	Michael Trim	Peter Mattei	February 9, 2016	0.881
Big Foster and Asa find it difficult to choose different tactics to put a stop to the greedy coal company's assault on their homestead and living off the grid way of life.
4	4	"Rubberneck"	Michael Trim	Ryan Farley	February 16, 2016	0.801
Houghton makes a deadly trip up the mountain while the coal company attempts to spy on the Farrells.
5	5	"Demolition"	Jon Amiel	Peter Tolan	February 23, 2016	0.764
Asa and Big Foster bond during a spontaneous and destructive crime spree.
6	6	"Weapons"	Jon Amiel	William Schmidt	March 1, 2016	0.728
Big Foster's lust for guns blows back on him and the entire Farrell clan.
7	7	"Decomp of a Stuck Pig"	Peter Werner	Ryan Farley	March 8, 2016	0.669
An unnerving road trip puts Asa and Houghton in closer quarters than they ever imagined.
8	8	"It's Good to Be King"	Peter Werner	Sara Goodman	March 15, 2016	0.737
Asa comes out of his cabin getting ready to go to the funeral but is crowded by Big Foster and his gang and is told to leave the mountain. Meanwhile, a funeral is taking place for the late Bren'in, Miss Lady Ray. Big Foster is confronted by his son, Lil' Foster, who tells him that he knows that he killed Miss Lady Ray. Big Foster, now the new Bren'in, proposes to G'Win after Lil' Foster says that she also believes that he was the one who killed Lady Ray. They both use the marriage as an opportunity to keep watch over one another. Meanwhile, in town, Hasil goes around looking for Sally Ann at her job but no one at the store wants to help him find her. The coal company has a meeting with the towns people on ways to get the Farrells off the mountain. After the meeting, Sally Ann's brother and his friends start drinking heavily at a bar, and threaten to kill all of the Farrells. While driving, they spot Hasil and start shooting at him, he tries to run away, but is eventually captured. After negotiating Farrell Wine for a gun, Asa returns to the camp, empties all of the bullets in the air, and tells Big Foster that he can get 100 more where that came from. Meanwhile, while attempting to find his missing son the Sheriff falls down an abandoned mine.
9	9	"Trust"	Rosemary Rodriguez	William Schmidt	March 22, 2016	0.673
Asa makes a deal with Big Foster to get him more guns. Hasil is captured and being held in the basement of one of Sally Ann's brother's friend's houses. They beat him up all night. Meanwhile, the Deputy Officers and the Sheriff's sister Ledda find the Sheriff's car parked on the side of the road with no sign of him, and it brings flashbacks to the night when the Sheriff's wife committed suicide years earlier. They then return to the house and find his son Caleb lying on the couch asleep. When asked his father's whereabouts, Caleb said that he didn't know where is father was. The Officers then head down to the garage and find the Sheriff's car all smashed up from the day he hit Tice. Big Foster confronts G'Win about still loving Asa which she continues to deny, but Big Foster still doesn't believe her and tells her he is going to banish Asa for good. G'Win suggests that Big Foster kills him, but is interrupted by Krake who has a bottle of Big Foster's favorite wine. Big Foster is enraged that his bodyguards are not paying attention and had let Krake in, so he ends shooting one of them in the leg with a bullet to send a message. This action causes him to be called into council to explain why he shot his guard. Asa goes looking for Hasil but ends up meeting with Sally Ann, and she helps him bottle some Farrell wine. Breece returns to the house where Hasil is being held, bringing along the lady who represents the coal company who then tries to get Hasil to join her team.
10	10	"Day Most Blessed"	Rosemary Rodriguez	Peter Tolan	March 29, 2016	0.809
Nuptials on Shay Mountain turn deadly.
11	11	"Mortar"	Andrew Bernstein	Ryan Farley	April 5, 2016	0.823
The struggle for guns come to a head as Houghton seeks revenge.
12	12	"All Hell"	Andrew Bernstein	Peter Tolan	April 12, 2016	0.954
Asa tries to stop Big Foster once and for all. By doing so he must risk everything.
13	13	"Long Live the Bren'in"	Peter Weller	Peter Mattei	April 19, 2016	0.956
Big Foster wakes up from a nightmare about him murdering his fa (Father in native language) and leaves his home to hunt the rest of traitors with his posse. Meanwhile Hasil and the Rebel Farrels make a plan to end Foster's Reign. As Foster is about to kill Krake, Hasil interrupts and leads them into a failed usurpation. He then banishes the rebel group and begins to hallucinate seeing his dead son Elon. Gwynveer finds Asa's necklace where his body was left, she confronts Little Foster. Big Foster, now realize that G'Win wanted to kill him, confront her and they violently fight with G'Win escaping by stabbing Big Foster. Little Foster finds Asa hiding at a creek where they learned to fish when they were children, Little Foster and Asa reconcile emotional embrace. Gwyn then finds Asa, who she tells to kill the Bren'in as only he can (As part of the prophecy.) Asa grabs his pistol from his shack and goes to the Bren'in's home and kills Big Foster. Gwyn, now the Bren'in, has Asa imprisoned. Meanwhile, the police, led by Sherriff Houghton make it to the top of Shay Mountain. Gwyn and the three clans (Shays, McGintucks and Farrells) surround the police and begins a chant that summons storm clouds, Houghton looks up just as lightning seemingly strikes the police as the camera fades to black.

=== Season 2 (2017) ===
No. overall	No. in season	Title	Directed by	Written by	Original release date	US viewers (millions)
14	1	"And the Three Shall Save You"	Jon Amiel	Peter Mattei	January 24, 2017	0.932
Lil Foster and G'Win decide Lil Foster needs to find his father's body, and he goes searching, only to be lead into town by a low-land hunter. Sheriff Houghton is bullied and teased for having run down from the mountain top after his encounter with the clans. He finds out his sister Ledda has pancreatic cancer. At the end of the episode, Lil Foster is captured by Sheriff Houghton after some towns people attempt to beat Lil Foster up. The governor sends a new case manager to handle the Farrell problem by fencing up the mountain and blocking off roads and access to the mountain. Big Foster is alive and tied to a bed in the basement of an abusive family in the town below the mountain.
15	2	"Shadowside"	Jon Amiel	Gordon Smith	January 31, 2017	0.834
Some strangers claiming to be the Kinnah, another clan that lives in the shadow side of the mountain arrive in the Farrell's village, claiming their water supply was tainted by the townspeople below them building roads up the mountain. G'Win and the rest of the Ferrel's are wary of them, but welcoming nonetheless. Lil Foster grapples with the court system of the outside world, feeling it is unfair, as his charges are for killing the Sheriff's brother in law, but the real killer is his father, Big Foster. Sheriff Houghton does his best to keep the peace between Lil Foster and the officers the governor sent to manage the Ferrel problem. Big Foster is raped by the mother of the abusive family and after an escape attempt, is chained to the bed rather than tied. A final escape attempt shows Big Foster giving food to the abused younger son of the family, and tells him to run away and never come back. Big Foster then kills the remaining family members and heads back up the mountain. On a patrol, a Ferrel cousin crashes his four wheeler and discovers the fence surrounding the mountain.
16	3	"Banishment"	David Rodriguez	Itamar Moses	February 7, 2017	0.747
A circle is called to determine the fate of Big Foster, G'Win hesitates to make a decision. The Kinnah make themselves comfortable in the clan's village. Meanwhile, Lil Foster, who has been wrongfully charged for murder, tries to fight his primal instincts in county jail, causing himself to be restrained by guards. Big Foster returns.
17	4	"How We Hunt"	David Rodriguez	Peter Tolan	February 14, 2017	0.797
Hasil and some fellow Farrell cousins go down beyond the fence and retrieve the crashed four wheeler, causing a fist fight that G'Win later chastised him for. Sally Ann's brother discovers her secret and she attempts suicide on the mountain, only to be stopped and walked up to Hasil by a young girl in the clan. Sheriff Houghton tries to get treatment for his sister, Ledda's cancer and struggles with his pill addiction. The case manager for the Farrell problem issues a fake article to the town newspaper, which the Sheriff then confronts him about, the case manager saying it makes him look better in the eyes of the town, and draws attention away from his "incident" on the mountain. Hasil begs G'Win to allow Sally Ann to stay on the mountain with him. Two cousins attempt to go on a run for beer, and are confronted with an armed security guard, who tells them to leave. Leda is organizing a public protest against the coal company.
18	5	"We Are Kinnah"	Michael Trim	Keith Schreier	February 21, 2017	0.773
19	6	"Kill or Be Killed"	Michael Trim	Linda McGibney	February 28, 2017	0.825
20	7	"Home for Supper"	Bill Johnson	Matt Kester	March 7, 2017	0.721
21	8	"Healing"	Bill Johnson	Itamar Moses	March 14, 2017	0.728
22	9	"Loyal to the Bone"	Keith Boak	Emily Brochin	March 21, 2017	0.886
23	10	"Stranger in a Strange Land"	Keith Boak	Keith Schreier	April 4, 2017	0.735
24	11	"The Run"	Jon Amiel	Linda McGibney	April 11, 2017	0.764
25	12	"What Must Be Done"	Jon Amiel	Matt Kester	April 18, 2017	0.622
26	13	"Unbroken Chain"	Jim Muro	Peter Mattei	April 25, 2017	0.673

== Reception ==
=== Reviews ===
On review aggregator Metacritic, Outsiders holds a score of 63/100, based on 17 critics, indicating "generally favorable reviews". On Rotten Tomatoes, the first season has an approval rating of 78%, stating "Outsiders' gritty performances keeps the backwoods drama intriguing, even when the story gets stuck in the mud."
