= Daniel Monks =

Australian actor and screenwriter

- Born: Perth, Western Australia
- Education: AFTRS
- Occupation: Actor
- Notable work: Pulse

Daniel Monks is an Australian actor and screenwriter.

== Early life ==
Monks was born in Perth, Western Australia, to actress and casting director Annie Murtagh-Monks, who was a graduate of Sydney's National Institute of Dramatic Art (NIDA), and performed her one-woman show, From Here to Maternity while seven months pregnant with Monk. As a child, Monks adapted and performed in school productions of several musicals, including Peter Pan and Alice in Wonderland.

At the age of 11, Monks was found to have a benign tumour on his cervical spinal cord. After undergoing the biopsy, medical negligence resulted in complications, including temporarily quadriplegia. It took six months for Monks to regain full function in his left side and partial function in his right leg, but his right arm remained paralysed. His tumour however, was successfully removed by Australian neurosurgeon Charlie Teo.

Monks subsequently gave up acting, assuming it would no longer be a feasible career path. He instead pursued the idea of filmmaking during his high school years, after which he went on to study at Sydney's Australian Film, Television and Radio School (AFTRS) and Perth’s PAC Screen Workshops.

== Career ==
Monk began his career making short films, many of which have screened at film festivals around the world, including Palm Springs International ShortFest. His shorts have also received several awards and honours. He was awarded the Young Filmmaker of the Year at the 2014 WA Screen Awards.

At the age of 23, Monks resumed his interest in acting once more. He wrote, starred in and produced 2017 drama feature film Pulse, based on his own life. That same year, he was a finalist for the 2017 Heath Ledger Scholarship. His performance in Pulse saw him nominated for the 2018 AACTA Award for Best Actor in a Leading Role. He was also nominated for the 2018 Helpmann Award for Best Male Actor in a Play for his performance in the 2017 Malthouse Theatre presentation of The Real and Imagined History of the Elephant Man.

After venturing to London in 2018 when Pulse was invited to screen at BFI Flare: London LGBTIQ+ Film Festival, Monks signed an agent and relocated there a few months later, to further his career. He made his West End debut the following year, playing the lead in Teenage Dick, a modern reimagining of Shakespeare’s Richard III, at the Donmar Warehouse. In 2020, he won Best Performer in a Play at The Stage Debut Awards for his performance. Monks went on to perform in a contemporary take on Chekhov's The Seagull, playing Konstantin, opposite Game of Thrones's Emilia Clarke.

In August 2024, it was announced that Monks had been cast as Ser Manfred Dondarrion in the upcoming series A Knight of the Seven Kingdoms. The series premiered in 2026.

In 2025, Monks played Brian Irvine in the mystery thriller miniseries All Her Fault, and made his Royal Shakespeare Company debut as Orsino in Shakespeare's Twelfth Night. The following year, he appeared as Jamie Lawson in BBC One drama miniseries Waiting for the Out.

Monks is also a dancer, having begun with the Catalyst Dance Masterclass Series in 2013. He was a recipient of the 2014 Amplify your Art grant, which led to him being professional trained by Philip Channells / Dance Integrated.

== Personal life ==
Due to a medical misadventure he experienced as a child, Monks has hemiplegia of the right side to this day. His right arm is totally paralysed and his right leg has only partial function.

Monks is openly gay.

== Awards and nominations ==
Year	Work	Award	Category	Result	Ref
2014		WA Screen Awards	Young Filmmaker of the Year	Won	
2015	Daniel Monks	NSW/ACT Young Achiever Awards	Arts & Fashion Award	Won	
2016		WA Screen Awards	Best Actor	Nominated	
2017	Daniel Monks	Heath Ledger Scholarship		Finalist	
2018	Pulse	AACTA Awards	Best Actor in a Leading Role	Nominated	
2018	Pulse	Busan International Film Festival	Flash Forward Busan Bank Award	Won	
2018	The Real and Imagined History of the Elephant Man	Helpmann Awards	Best Male Actor in a Play	Nominated	
2018	The Real and Imagined History of the Elephant Man	Green Room Awards	Best Male Actor in a Play	Nominated	
2020	Teenage Dick	The Stage Debut Awards	Best Performer in a Play	Won	

== Performer credits ==
=== Film ===
Year	Title	Role	Notes	Ref
2013	The Ducks	Jackson (lead)	Short film	
2013	Frankie & Clay	Frankie (lead)	Short film	
2013	God & the Grey Area	Harry	Short film	
2014	It's All About Me	Dancer	Short film	
2014	Gold Cage	Daniel (lead)	Short film	
2014	Gravel	Vincent	Short film	
2015	Jackie	Daniel	Short film	
2015	Marrow	Daniel (lead)	Short film	
2015	Yummy Cuppy	Albert Ashby (lead)	Short film	
2016	NDIA Video	Adam Corelli (lead)	Video	
2016	Eric	John (Lead)	Short film	
2017	Pulse	Olly	Feature film	
2017	Marley, Someone	Lloyd	Feature film	
2017	iLead eLearning Mockumentary	Andrew (lead)	Video	
2018	Broken	Matt (lead)	Short film	
2020	Perspective Shift	Self	Documentary	
2022	Sissy	Jamie	Feature film	
2022	National Theatre Live: The Seagull	Konstantin		
2024	In the Room Where He Waits	Toby (lead)		
2024	Ricky Stanicky	Keith	Feature film	
2024	Weasel Frankie VS Uncle Elton	Weasel Frankie	Short film	

=== Television ===
Year	Title	Role	Notes	Ref
2017	Go Happy Feet!	Dan (lead)		
2018	#AiFUpload		TV short	
2019	Silent Witness	Barrister Delaney	1 episode	
2019	The Split	Mr Latham	1 episode	
2023	Dead Hot	Eugene Crumlish	Miniseries, 2 episodes	
2024	Kaos	Nax	Miniseries, 5 episodes	
2025	It Gets Worse	Graham		
2025	Waiting for the Out	Jamie Lawson	Miniseries, 3 episodes	
2025	All Her Fault	Brian Irvine	Miniseries, 7 episodes	
2026	A Knight of the Seven Kingdoms	Ser Manfred Dondarrion	5 episodes	
TBA	Untitled Peaky Blinders Sequel Series #1	Detective Inspector Bell	In production	

=== Stage ===
Year	Title	Role	Notes	Ref
2013	Second Skin	Dancer	Catalyst	
2013	For the End (24 Hour Play Project)	Hunter (Lead)	Griffin Theatre Company, Sydney	
2014	Beyond Technique (residency)	Dancer	Dance Integrated Australia	
2014	The Corner Dance Lab	Dancer	Dance Integrated Australia & The Animal Farm Collective	
2014	Melting Pot Residency	Dancer	Bankstown Arts Centre, Sydney	
2014	It's All About Me (solo)	Dancer	Dance Integrated Australia	
2015	Bedside Manner – 24 Hour Party	Ben (lead)	Tamarama Rock Surfers, Sydney	
2015	Bower Birds	Flame (lead)	Murmuration Dance Theatre	
2015	Strip (play reading)	Monty	Tamarama Rock Surfers, Sydney	
2015	Fitting into Wageni (as part of ASYLUM)	Lefti	Apocalypse Theatre Company	
2015	The Wonderful World of Dissocia	Goat / Biffer / Ensemble	The Kings Collective	
2016	Orpheus	Orpheus (lead)	Lies, Lies and Propaganda / Suspicious Woman Productions	
2016	Ordinary Sin (play development)	Various	Company of Rogues	
2017	The Real and Imagined History of the Elephant Man	Joseph Merrick (lead)	Malthouse Theatre, Melbourne	
2017	The Normal Heart Staged Reading for Marriage Equality	Felix Turner	Darlinghurst Theatre, Sydney	
2017	Frank Enstein	Frank (lead)	The Farm, co3 & Bleached Arts	
2017–2018	Are We Awake?	Hypnos (lead)	Old Fitz Theatre, Sydney, Kings Cross Theatre with Red Line Productions	
2019	Teenage Dick	Richard (lead)	Donmar Warehouse, London	
2019	Lord of the Flies	Roger	Roslyn Packer Theatre, Sydney with STC	
2020; 2022	The Seagull	Konstantin (lead)	ATG, London with Jamie Lloyd Company	
2021	The Normal Heart	Mickey Marcus	National Theatre, London	
2024–2025	The Cherry Orchard	Pyotr Trofimov	Donmar Warehouse, London, St Ann'a Warehouse, NYC	
2025	Twelfth Night	Orsino	Barbican Centre, London & Royal Shakespeare Company	

== Writer/director/producer credits ==
=== Film ===
Year	Title	Role	Notes	Ref
2009	Love Like There's No Tomorrow	Writer / director	Short film	
2010	Herman and Marjorie	Writer / director / producer / editor	Short film	
2011	Wild Imaginings	Writer / director / producer / editor	Short film	
2011	Charlotte	Writer / director / producer / editor	Short film	
2012	Pretty	Writer / director / producer / editor	Short film	
2012	Dear Life	Writer / director	Short film	
2015	Marrow	Writer / producer	Short film	
2017	Pulse	Writer / producer / editor	Feature film	
2018	Broken	Writer / producer	Short film	
2022	Sissy	Writer / producer	Feature film	
