= The Gift (1997 TV series) =

Australian children's television series

- Genre: Children's television series
- Created by: David Ogilvy
- Directed by: Kendal Flanagan; Mark DeFriest; Alicia Walsh, Lis Hoffmann; Steven Peddie
- Country of origin: Australia
- Original language: English
- No. of seasons: 1
- No. of episodes: 26

Production
- Executive producers: Paul D. Barron; Claire Henderson; John Hugginson; Joan Peters; Madeleine Warburg
- Producers: Barbi Taylor and Paul D Barron
- Production company: Barron Entertainment Ltd

Original release
- Network: Nine Network
- Release: 27 October – 19 December 1997

The Gift is an Australian children's television series that first screened on the Nine Network Australia in 1997. It featured 26 half-hour episodes produced by Barron Entertainment Ltd. The show reaired on the ABC in December 1998, and on ABC3 in 2011.

== Synopsis ==
The Gift is passed on from one person to the next and gives the carrier the power to do anything they dream. When the Gift carrier discovers the Gift's true potential they have to pass it on to someone else.

== Cast ==
- Peter Rowsthorn as Raff
- Kate Beahan as Enzo
- Kazimir Sas as Henry
- Khan Chittenden as Leo
- Clinton Voss as Desmond
- Claire Sprunt as Jess
- Igor Sas as Robert
- Gillian Alexy as Sharon
- Joseph Atherden as Phillip
- Nicolette Findley as Edwina
- Kahren Hampton as Helen
- Alan Rosenwald as Eric
- Steele Sciberras as Billy
- Colin McEwan

== See also ==
- List of Australian television series
