= Parallax (TV series) =

- Genre: Drama; Science fiction
- Created by: Paul Barron
- Starring: Joshua Marshall-Clarke; Gillian Alexy; Caroline Brazier; David Richardson; Francoise Sas; Kazimir Sas; Rebecca McCarthy; Genevieve McCarthy; Lauren Williams; Luke Hewitt; Paris Abbott; Igor Sas
- Composers: Tim Count; Keith van Geyzel
- Country of origin: Australia
- Original language: English
- No. of series: 1
- No. of episodes: 26

Production
- Executive producers: Posie Graeme-Evans; Theresa Plummer-Andrews
- Producer: Paul Barron
- Cinematography: Peter Falk
- Running time: 25 minutes
- Production companies: Screenwest; Lotterywest; Great Western Entertainment

Original release
- Network: Nine Network
- Release: 5 August – 10 September 2004

Parallax is an Australian children's television series that screened on the Nine Network. It is a 26-episode series funded by the Film Finance Corporation Australia and supported by Lotterywest. The series was filmed in various locations around Perth. These include Kings Park, East Perth, and many beach and South West forest locations.

The series is about a boy named Ben Johnson, who discovers a portal to multiple parallel universes, and explores them with his friends: Francis Short, Melinda Bruce, Una, Due, Tiffany and Mundi as well as newfound sister, Katherine Raddic.

== Cast ==
=== Main cast ===
- Joshua Marshall-Clarke as Ben Johnson
- Gillian Alexy as Katherine Raddic
- Caroline Brazier as Veronica Johnson / Betti
- David Richardson as Francis Short / Francis Zapmeister
- Francoise Sas as Melinda Bruce
- Kazimir Sas as Martin Dunkly
- Rebecca McCarthy as Fortuna / Una
- Genevieve McCarthy as Due
- Lauren Williams as Mundi
- Luke Hewitt as Jeremy Johnson
- Paris Abbott as Tiffany
- Igor Sas as Stefan Raddic
- David Ngoombujarra as Otto

=== Guest cast ===
- Faith Clayton as Mrs Irma Dawes
- Kristian Barron as Spy Kid

== Significant objects and locations ==
Stave
A kind of baton that most Guardians possess. It has various functions including communication over different worlds to other stave holders, a radio, manipulation of electronic devices and most importantly, the ability to shoot lasers which kill Welkin and Krellicks

Orb
A smooth, white sphere. There is one orb for every world whether it be hidden or in possession of the resident Guardian. When not in its original world, if a person with full Guardian blood touches the orb, whatever happened in the world before the removal of the orb will play like a movie on its surface. When the orb is in its original world the person will be transported to the Reading Room thus the orb being its 'keys'. The orbs also act as a defence to the Welkin and Krellicks hiding the blood of a Guardian.

Reading Room
The central repository of all knowledge of the Parallax. It keeps records of all the bad and good times of the stories and creatures in the Parallax. Although it is not a control room. The weather can't be changed and an election can't be fixed. Also the central hub of all world transportation.

Golden Stave
Only comes into being when a normal stave is taken to the Reading Room. Able to control the "Wheel of Knowledge". Can also manipulate certain times and events to an extent.

Purple Water
The key to Betti's blandishment. Betti pours it into the water supply of a world. It reacts with a person who does not fit into the 17.65% personality average of that world and turns them into water vapour. For example, if in the Hippie World a businessman drank the purple water, he would be blandished.

Francis Cam
The form of communication through the Parallax. This is started by Techno World Una and Hippie World Francis. It is a link between four worlds, Techno, Forest, Ben's and Hippie World. The Francises in each world each have a camera with the exception of Techno World which is patrolled by Una. The Francis Cam is used to report Betti sightings, Spy Boy etc.

Purple eyes
Betti and Spy Boy's alternate eye colour. Their eyes turn purple when they're not telling the truth or if they're getting angry. Its true purpose is not yet known.

== Worlds ==
=== Main worlds ===
Ben's World
The red world, in which the series starts. Could be considered as the "normal" world. Links to Katherine's World through an old drain and Techno World through a chicken shed. When pushing different points on the parallax at the old drain characters can also travel to Forest and Desert Worlds. There is also a portal in Mr Dawes's shed that links to Garden World when the right combination is used (1-1-11).

Katherine's World
The blue world, where Ben finds a sister he never knew existed, as well as his biological father. A very formal and organised world with many strict laws. Links to Ben's World via two large rocks and Hippie World by going in between two bookcases at a library. When pushing points on the parallax at the two rocks you can travel to Forest World. There is also a portal on the nearby beach. It leads to the tent owned by Betti in Desert World.

Francis' Hippie World
The yellow world. This is a very 'mellow' world filled with Hippies, literally. The only known portal here is through an old Volkswagen Type 2 Kombi van located in front of the house of this world's Francis (A.K.A. The Werrinup Thief), which links to Katherine's World, and Forest World via the right combination.

Una's Techno World
The silver world, first thought to be a hi-tech rubbish tip. Everyone lives well and the world is very advanced in technology. The town's motto is "Tomorrow's technology, at yesterday's prices." The portal to get to Ben's World is located at the hi-tech rubbish tip. The other portal is located at an abandoned office building and becomes accessible when a password is typed onto a computer, links to Garden World.

Mundi's Forest World
The green world, Ben accidentally stumbles upon this world when he trips onto the Parallax symbol. A world that takes care of its environment, its Werrinup is built on towers above the forest floor to minimise human impact on the eco system. This world is infested by Krellicks and its people are protected through the height of their structures. The tree portal links to Ben's World, Katherine's World, or Techno World, though only when the right combination is hit on the symbol. The rock portal that links to Forest World is located outside of Mrs Dawes house on the forest floor. It is currently though guarded by the Krellicks and used as a nest.

=== Other worlds ===
Desert World
The orange world, a lifeless place of sand and stone. Ben's mother sends him to this world as a test. One portal is located over a rock mound and goes to Ben's World via the right combination on the Parallax (7-1). The other portal is at the corner of a tent owned by Betti. It links to Katherine's World. It's later discovered that Desert World is also Otto's original homeworld, before it was destroyed by Betti.

Garden World
The pink world, Betti shows Katherine this world as an example of her goal in the Parallax. This world is in its own way perfect, the people who did not fit in have been effectively blandished. One portal is located through a do not enter door, and links to Techno World. The other is at a forked tree and leads to Ben's World.

Bush World
The brown world, this is the world in which Otto, the lost guardian has escaped to. Only one portal is known. It is in the middle of a river and links to Forest World. The other portal was meant to be down the river.

Swamp World
Only seen briefly when Ben accidentally stumbles into this place via the Reading Room. No portals through this world are known.

== Side Doors ==
There are portals known as Side Doors which are like normal portals but are for singular trips and once you go through it you cannot go through it the way you came out. Ben and Katherine noticed other portal lights when Ben pressed a button on the stave in the Reading Room. They then asked Mrs Dawes if she knew about Side Doors but she sent them to her brother, Mr Dawes. He told them about Side Doors and the condition if you use one. There is only one known Side Door which is Mr Dawes' shed and it links to a seat in Garden World.

No.	Title	Original release date
1	"One Big Happy Family"	5 August 2004
Ben Johnston discovers a portal to parallel universes hidden in his surf shed. He meets Katherine, a sister he never knew existed, and learns that their mother Veronica is a Guardian of the Parallax. The siblings begin to understand the vast network of worlds connected by the portals.
2	"A Rare Find"	6 August 2004
Ben and Katherine uncover a mysterious artifact that seems to hold clues about the Guardians’ responsibilities. Their discovery attracts unwanted attention from Betti, who begins plotting against them.
3	"The Artful Dodger"	9 August 2004
Francis, Ben’s mischievous friend, causes chaos when he stumbles into the portals. His antics across worlds force Ben and Katherine to chase him, revealing the dangers of careless travel between universes.
4	"Achey, Breaky Heart"	10 August 2004
Ben struggles with his feelings about his fractured family. Katherine tries to help him accept their new reality, but emotional tensions rise when they encounter a world where their parents are still together.
5	"Lost in Paradise"	11 August 2004
The siblings discover a seemingly perfect world, but soon realize its beauty hides sinister secrets. They must escape before Betti manipulates events to trap them there.
6	"One Man’s Rubbish"	12 August 2004
Ben learns that discarded items from one world can be valuable in another. His curiosity leads to trouble when Betti uses this knowledge to exploit the Parallax for her own gain.
7	"Artes Veritas"	13 August 2004
Artworks across worlds reveal hidden truths about the Guardians. Katherine begins to understand her role, while Ben struggles with the responsibility thrust upon him.
8	"The Battle of Mundi’s World"	23 August 2004
Ben and Katherine are caught in a conflict in Mundi’s world. They must choose sides carefully, as the outcome could destabilize the Parallax.
9	"The Big Sleep-Over"	24 August 2004
Trying to balance normal teenage life with multiverse adventures, Katherine hosts a sleepover. But when portals open unexpectedly, her friends are pulled into danger.
10	"The Martin Crimes"	25 August 2004
Martin Dunkly’s schemes across worlds are exposed. Ben realizes Martin’s ambitions could threaten the balance of the Parallax.
11	"The World According to Betti"	26 August 2004
Betti manipulates events to reshape the Parallax according to her vision. The siblings must stop her before she consolidates power.
12	"The Curse of the Incredibly Bad News"	27 August 2004
Strange messages spread panic across worlds. Ben and Katherine race to uncover the source before chaos consumes the Parallax.
13	"Decoy"	30 August 2004
Ben is tricked by doubles from other universes. He learns the importance of trust and caution when identities can shift so easily.
14	"Too Many Chiefs"	31 August 2004
Leadership conflicts arise among the Guardians. Katherine struggles to assert herself while Ben tries to mediate.
15	"Ex-Ben"	1 September 2004
Ben encounters an alternate version of himself who made very different choices. The meeting forces him to reflect on his own path.
16	"Dad Meets Dad"	2 September 2004
Ben’s father unexpectedly meets his double from another world. The encounter raises questions about identity and belonging.
17	"The Krellick War"	3 September 2004
A war between insect-like creatures threatens multiple worlds. Ben and Katherine must intervene to prevent devastation spreading across the Parallax.
18	"The Reluctant Guardian"	6 September 2004
Katherine struggles with her responsibilities as a Guardian. She questions whether she is ready to protect the Parallax.
19	"Seek and You Shall Find"	7 September 2004
The siblings search for hidden truths in the Parallax. Their discoveries bring them closer to understanding Betti’s ultimate plan.
20	"Sand Witch"	8 September 2004
In a desert world, Ben and Katherine face new dangers. They must solve riddles to escape alive.
21	"My Favourite Martin"	9 September 2004
Martin Dunkly’s influence grows across worlds. Ben realizes Martin may be as dangerous as Betti.
22	"Cheats Never Prosper"	10 September 2004
Betrayal and dishonesty cause chaos in the Parallax. Ben learns the importance of integrity in multiverse dealings.
23	"Martinmania"	13 September 2004
Martin’s schemes spiral out of control. His obsession with power threatens the stability of the Parallax.
24	"The Reading Room"	14 September 2004
Ben and Katherine uncover secrets in the Reading Room. The knowledge they gain could change the fate of the Parallax.
25	"Clownin’ Around"	15 September 2004
A bizarre clown world tests the siblings’ courage. They must overcome fear and confusion to survive.
26	"It Ain’t Over"	16 September 2004
The final showdown with Betti takes place in the Reading Room. Veronica recovers at the surf shed, and the siblings realize their journey has only just begun.

== Home media ==
Parallax: The Portal Opens, was released on 4 August 2005. It contains a condensed movie version, taking clips from the first 8 episodes.
