= Joel Turner (actor) =

Australian television actor (born 1987)

- Born: 1987 (age 37–38); Perth, Western Australia, Australia
- Occupation: Actor
- Years active: 2000–present
- Website: www.joelturnertheactor.com

Joel Turner (born 1987) is an Australian television actor, best known for portraying Wayne Payne in the Nine Network young adult series Foreign Exchange.

== Filmography ==
Year	Title	Role	Notes
2004	Foreign Exchange	Wayne Payne (main role)	TV series, 16 episodes
2005	Streetsmartz	Stavros Papadopoulos	TV series, 3 episodes
2011	SLiDE	MC	TV series, 1 episode
