= Foreign Exchange (Australian TV series) =

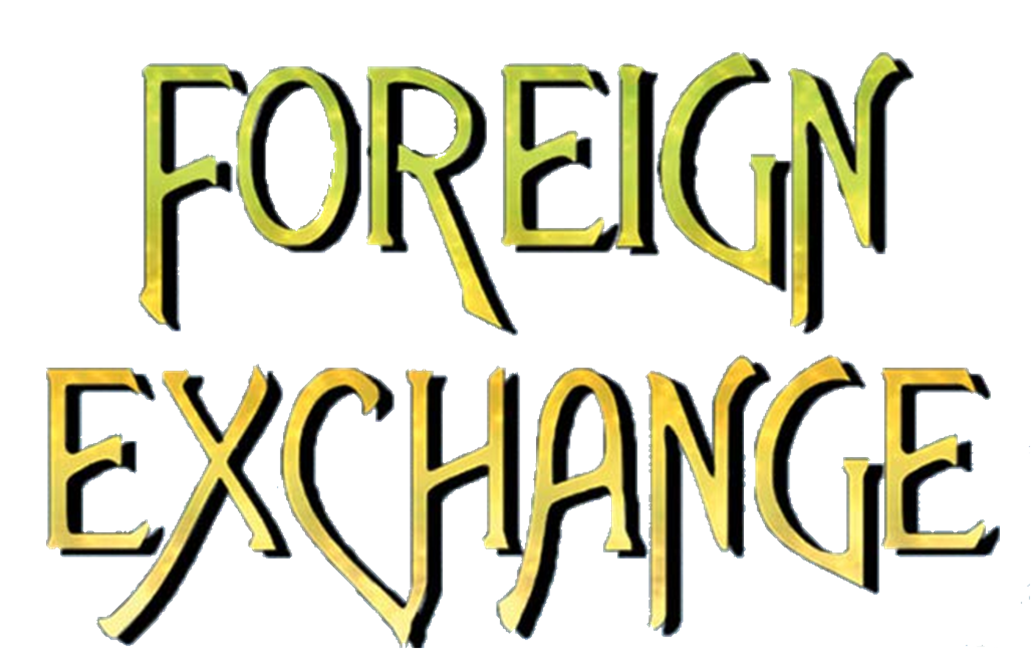
- Genre: Fantasy
- Created by: John Rapsey
- Written by: John Rapsey; Richard Conroy; Armin Prediger; Tracey Defty; Mark B. Hodkinson; Marcus Fleming; Annie Fox; Bob Swain; Marteinn Thorisson
- Directed by: Annie Murtagh-Monks; Gillian Reynolos
- Starring: Lynn Styles; Zachary Garred
- Theme music composer: Braedy Neal
- Countries of origin: Australia; Ireland
- Original language: English
- No. of seasons: 1
- No. of episodes: 26

Production
- Executive producers: Mary Callery; Ralph Christians; Jo Horsburgh
- Producers: Susie Campbell; Gerry McColgan; Hermann Florin; Noel Price
- Running time: 25 minutes
- Production companies: Southern Star Entertainment; Raidió Teilifís Éireann

Original release
- Network: Nine Network; RTÉ Two
- Release: 5 November – 27 December 2004

Foreign Exchange is a television series produced by Southern Star in association with Irish public broadcaster RTÉ (Raidió Teilifís Éireann). It aired on Nine Network from 5 November to 27 December 2004. The series starred Lynn Styles as Hannah O'Flaherty, a feisty Irish girl, and Zachary Garred as Brett Miller, a sun-drenched Australian boy. The pair are brought together from opposite sides of the world, due to a transfer portal. The series of 26 episodes was created by the Australian author John Rapsey and directed by Annie Murtagh-Monks and Gillian Reynolos.

== Synopsis ==
Foreign Exchange had two major sets, one in Galway, Ireland, and the other in Perth, Western Australia. Brett Miller and his family live underneath their restaurant, only to find a rock that opens a portal into the basement level of O'Keeffe's College, an Irish boarding school (which is in reality Castlehackett House, near Tuam, County Galway). There he unexpectedly bumps into Hannah O'Flaherty, a student from Galway, who is delighted to learn that when she turns a similar rock on her side of the portal, she can escape the grey and winter of Ireland to the sun and summer of Australia. The show revolves around these two characters, who are the only two to know and use the portal with the exception of Cormac MacNamara, who learns about the portal near the end of the season.

== Characters ==
- Brett Miller (Zachary Garred): A young Australian surfer who finds a portal that takes him to Ireland, in the basement of a boarding school, O'Keeffe's College. He becomes the best friend of Hannah, and they never tell anyone about the portal. Originally an only child, his mother Jackie remarried to Craig and he now has a little sister Meredith. Also living in the home is Wayne, his big brother. In Ireland, Brett finds work as a janitor's assistant. Initially, he has a crush on Tara, over the course of the series, he realises that his true passion is Hannah.
- Hannah O'Flaherty (Lynn Styles): An Irish student at O'Keeffe's College, best friend of Brett. She boards at the school as a roommate with Tara. Hannah is smart and a close friend of Cormac, the local genius. The school's director, Miss Murphy (Barbara Griffin), is suspicious of her disappearances (when she goes to Australia). Hannah loves Brett's family and vice versa. In Australia everyone thinks she is a surfer.
- Cormac MacNamara (Robert Sheehan): One of the smartest students at O'Keeffe's College. He always has some new invention and is a close friend of Hannah.
- Tara Keegan (Danielle Fox-Clarke): Hannah's roommate, who never suspected the portal. She likes to appear popular. Tara is interested in fashion, shopping, gossip, beauty treatments and money. Often she leaves school only to go to the shopping mall. Initially Brett has a crush on her.
- Martin Staunton (Dan Colley): Son of the vice-director and advisor of O'Keeffe's College, boyfriend of Tara. His father is rich.
- Meredith Payne (Chelsea Jones): Meredith is the daughter of Craig, the younger sister of Wayne, the stepdaughter of Jackie and the stepsister of Brett. She is a generous, kind, honest, intelligent girl and always gives her opinion. She likes Brett and Hannah a lot, and she thinks that they are an item, and also likes Wayne although he is often rude and loud. She loves to read.
- Wayne Payne (Joel Turner): He is Brett's stepbrother and Meredith's elder brother. He likes bullying Brett.
- Jackie Miller-Payne (Kirsty Hillhouse): Mother of Brett and stepmother of Meredith and Wayne. She is a great cook and runs the family restaurant.
- Craig Payne (Greg McNeill, credited as Gregory O'Neill): Husband of Jackie, father of Wayne and Meredith, stepfather of Brett. He tries to live with their three children of an organised manner.
- Seamus McCracken (Peter Dineen): Caretaker and janitor of the college and boss of Brett.
- Eilish Murphy (Barbara Griffin): Director of O'Keeffe's College. She suspects that Brett and Hannah have some kind of secret.
