= David Richardson (actor) =

Australian television actor (born 1987)

- Born: 13 April 1987 (age 39); Perth, Western Australia, Australia
- Occupation: Actor
- Years active: 2004–present

David Richardson (born 20 March 1987) is an Australian television actor.

== Career ==
Richardson has had major roles in two Australian children's television drama series. He was one of the regular cast members in Parallax in 2004, playing four versions of Francis Short from different parallel universes. This was followed up by the starring role in three series of Streetsmartz as Vinnie Martino in 2005 and 2006.

Since dropping out of Western Australian Academy of Performing Arts (WAAPA), Richardson has starred in a number of short films, including an adaptation of the Stephen King short story Cain Rose Up, and on stage, most notably in an adaptation of Lord of the Flies.

In 2010, he had a small role in the Australian thriller Wasted on the Young.

Some of Richardson's most recent work includes a television advertisement with Boxer Danny Green. In 2014 the commercial was broadcast Australia wide to promote the dangers of drug and alcohol related violence.

== Filmography ==
- Parallax (2004) as Francis Short
- Streetsmartz (2005–06) as Vinnie Martino
