= Kazimir Sas =

Australian actor

Kazimir Sas is an Australian film and television actor. He is best known for his work on children's television series such as The Gift (1997), Parallax (2004), and Time Trackers (2008).

== Career ==
On television, Sas appeared in the children's television series The Gift (1997), Parallax (2004), and Time Trackers (2008). He has also appeared in adult drama series All Saints and The Alice (2005).

Sas has also appeared in the short films Killing Candy (2002), Crush (2005) and Punch Drunk (2005).

Sas was one of the six actors in the 2009 Black Swan State Theatre Company's HotBed Ensemble, a professional development programme for emerging Western Australian artists. He appeared with the group in the stage play Dark Room, by Angela Betzien, in May 2009.
