= Gillian Alexy =

Australian actress (born 1983)

- Born: March 13, 1983 (age 43); Perth, Western Australia, Australia
- Other name: Gillian McLaughlin
- Occupation: Actress
- Years active: 1994–2022

Gillian Alexy (born March 13, 1983) is an Australian former actress. She started her career as a child actress on television in 1994, later moving to adult roles. She may be best known for her role as Tayler Geddes for two seasons of McLeod's Daughters, her recurring role as Gitta Novak for one season of Damages, and G'Winveer Farrell on Outsiders. Her last appearance was the 2022 independent film Avarice.

== Early life ==
Alexy graduated from the John Curtin College of the Arts in 2000, after doing specialist dance and theatre courses. Afterwards, she went to the Actors Centre in London, Le Centre des Arts Vivants and L'École de Danse Peter Goss in Paris, and spent six months toward a theatre degree at the University of Colorado at Boulder.

== Career ==
Alexy began her acting career at the age of ten, making her debut in 1994 in the television series Ship to Shore. In 1997 she appeared in her first leading television role, the children's series The Gift, for which she played the part for the first and only season. Her second leading role was in the series Parallax, another television series which was cancelled after just one season. She gained notability for her role as Tayler Geddes on Logie Award-winning television series McLeod's Daughters; she first appeared at the end of season 6, in which her character came to Drovers Run to get revenge on Regan McLeod, whom she held responsible for the death of her father.

Alexy's other television credits include Fast Tracks, All Saints, The Strip, Packed to the Rafters. In 2011, she began appearing on American television, in the series' Law & Order: Special Victims Unit and Blue Bloods. She starred in the Australian film West in 2007, playing a supporting role opposite Khan Chittenden and Nathan Phillips.

Alexy took part in a backdoor pilot for the proposed TV series NCIS:Red in early 2013, the cast of which appeared in the spin-off debut double-episodes of NCIS: Los Angeles, "Red, Part 1" and "Red, Part 2", in March that year. The series was ultimately not picked up by the network.

In 2023, Alexy had the starring role in the Australian feature film Avarice.

== Filmography ==
=== Film ===
Year	Title	Role	Notes
2005	The Umbrella Condition	Holly	Short film
2006	Underexposed		Short film
2007	West	Cheryl	
2007	Little Charmer	Eve	Short film
2008	Mockingbird	Emily	Short film
2008	Cane Cutter	Pearl	Short film
2014	Monkfish		
2015	Anchors	Christine	
2017	People You May Know	Abigail	
2022	Avarice	Kate Matthews	

=== Television ===
Year	Title	Role	Notes
1994	Ship to Shore	Chloe	Episode: "Aussie Holiday" (as Gillian McLaughlin)
1996	Bush Patrol	Eloise	unknown episodes
1997	The Gift	Sharon	Main cast
1998	Fast Tracks	Alana Burroughs	Main cast
2004	Parallax	Katherine Raddic	Main cast
2005–06	All Saints	Nicole Higgins	Episodes: "Immortal", "No Way Out"
2006–09	McLeod's Daughters	Tayler Jane Geddes	Guest role (season 6), main cast (seasons 7–8)
2008	The Strip	Cherry Cunningham	Episode: "1.6"
2008	Packed to the Rafters	Lauren Valco	Episode: "Taking the Lead"
2011	Law & Order: Special Victims Unit	Danielle 'Dani' Hynes	Episode: "Double Strands"
2011	Blue Bloods	Ellen Sloan	Episode: "Innocence"
2011	Unforgettable	Laura	Episode: "Lost Things"
2012	Nurse Jackie	Hip Replacement Patient	Episode: "Chaud & Froid"
2012	Damages	Gitta Novak	Recurring role (season 5)
2013	Castle	Candice Mayfield	Episode: "Death Gone Crazy"
2013	NCIS: Los Angeles	Claire Keats	Episodes: "Red: Parts 1 & 2"
2013–15	The Americans	Annelise a.k.a. Celia Gerard	4 episodes
2014	The Crazy Ones	Megan	Episode: "The Lighthouse"
2014–15	Royal Pains	Charlotte	5 episodes
2015	NCIS: New Orleans	Savannah Kelly	3 episodes
2015	Aquarius	Martha Kendall	Episode: "Sick City"
2016–17	Outsiders	G'Winveer Farrell	Main cast
2018	Dirty John	Maggie	Episode: "Remember It Was Me"
2020	The Blacklist	Victoria Fenberg	Episode: "Victoria Fenberg"

== Theatre ==
Year	Title	Role	Venue / Company
1999	Popcorn		
2000	Return to the Forbidden Planet		
2001	Mice		
2002	Resident Alien		
2003	Six Characters Looking for an Author		
2004	Ghost Train		
2004	The Chatroom		
2004	Bed	Daisy	Perth Institute of Contemporary Arts with ThinIce Productions
2005	Codes of Practice		
