= Ship to Shore (TV series) =

Australian children's tv series (1993–96)

- Created by: David Rapsey; Gwenda Marsh (series 3)
- Composer: Greg Schultz
- Country of origin: Australia
- No. of series: 3
- No. of episodes: 78

Production
- Executive producer: Paul D. Barron
- Producers: David Rapsey (series 1); Barbi Taylor (series 1–2); Jan Tyrrell (series 3); Paul D. Barron (series 2–3)
- Production locations: Perth; Western Australia
- Running time: approx. 24 minutes
- Production company: Barron Entertainment

Original release
- Network: Nine Network
- Release: 1 November 1993 – 22 November 1996

Ship to Shore is an Australian children's television series devised by David Rapsey and written by Glenda Hambly, John Rapsey, Mary Morris, Everett de Roche, Ysabelle Dean, Jon Stephens and others. The program was shown on the Nine Network and ABC and in Australia, on YTV in Canada, and briefly on Nickelodeon in the United States and the United Kingdom.

In September 2014, Greg Carroll, who played the show's bumbling security guard Hermes Endakis, announced he was writing a musical based on his Ship to Shore role.

The show has what is widely regarded as the greatest theme song of all time, becoming more popular than the Chris de Burgh song of the same name.

== Synopsis ==
The show centres around the lives of a group of children living on Circe Island, a fictional island off the coast of Perth, in Western Australia. The show premiered on the Nine Network on November 1, 1993.. Two further seasons were aired in 1994 and 1996. Each episode was 24 minutes long.

The first series was more comedic, with a focus on the children outwitting the bumbling adult characters, particularly security guard Hermes Endakis, played by Greg Carroll. Later series included more social and environmental issues, particularly in the second series where the children try to stop a big corporation from destroying their island.

== Cast ==
=== Main characters ===
- Clinton Voss as Kelvin Crump
- Jodi Herbert as Julie Jones (series 1–2; recurring 3.1–3.2, 3.25–3.26)
- Cleonie Morgan-Wootton as Bianca "Babe" Keogh (series 1–2; guest 3.4, 3.26)
- Heath Miller as Ralph Knowles (series 1–2; recurring 3.1–3.2, 3.25–3.26)
- Kimberley Stark as Geraldine Crump, Kelvin's younger sister
- Ewen Leslie as Guido Bellini (series 1–2)
- Ronald Underwood as Billy Miller (series 1–2)
- Christie Pitts as Sally Johnson (episodes 1.1–2.9)
- Greg Carroll as Heremes Endakis, head of the island's security force
- Louise Love as Louella Docherty (series 2–3)
- Robbie Hackney as Gavin Garney (series 2–3; guest 1.7, 1.24)
- Francoise Sas as Amy Docherty, Lou's cousin (episodes 2.10–3.26)
- Sara Kotai as Victoria-Elizabeth Dafoe (series 2.10–2.26)
- Heath Bergersen as Aaron (series 3)
- Adam Briggs as Milan Radich (series 3)
- Benjamin Chow as Garth Leong (series 3)
- Joshua Crane as Peter "PP" Puckrin, Geraldine and Kelvin's cousin (series 3)
- April Locke as Sandy Leong (series 3)
- Jemma Thomson as Krystal Mabbs (series 3)

=== Supporting characters ===
==== Introduced in series 1 ====
- Igor Sas as Andrew Knowles, Ralph's father
- Louise Miller as Andrea Selby, teacher
- Brian Fitzsimmons as Charlie Puckrin
- Kate Hall as Helen Jones
- Caroline McKenzie as Susan Crump, Kelvin and Geraldine's mother
- Michael Loney as Harry Crump, Kelvin and Geraldine's father
- Rosemarie Lenzo as Cassandra Knowles, Ralph's mother
- Steve Shaw as Frank
- Eileen Colocott as Mrs Crawford
- Margaret Ford as Miss Hurley
- Richard Hearder as Mr Spratford
- Rosalba Verucci as Mrs Bellini, Guido's mother
- John Cost as Mr Bellini, Guido's father
- Dene Irvin as Reg Miller

==== Introduced in series 2 ====
- Brett Partridge as Jake
- Matt Crute as Rottnest Island New Years Eve drunk
- Nicola Bartlett as Rosalind Defoe, Victoria-Elizabeth's mother
- Wendy Strehlow as Denise Garney, Gavin's mother
- Faith Clayton as Mrs Archer
- Michael Turkic as Drek
- David Moran as Graham Doherty

==== Introduced in series 3 ====
- Bill Kerr as Horace Brinkmann
- Adam Briggs as Milan Radich
- Richard Piper as Zorba Endakis
- Monica Main as Madeline Mabbs, Krystal's mother
- John O'Brien as James Leong, Garth and Sandi's father
- Patricia Stephenson as Trudi Leong, Garth and Sandi's mother
- Ingle Knight as Kowalski
- Glenn Swift as Anton Radich

== Production ==
Series one was produced by David Rapsey and Barbi Taylor, series two and three by Barbi Taylor and Paul Barron, who was also the executive producer of all three series.

The series was filmed on location in Point Peron and Rockingham, Perth, with shots of Garden Island and the bridge to HMAS Stirling creating the feel of an island. Additional interior classroom filming was performed in Applecross Primary School, Applecross.

The show was produced by Barron Films Limited for and in association with the Nine Network and ABC in Australia, Ravensburger (Germany), the BBC (UK; Series 1 only), and Nickelodeon (US; Series 3 only), with the support of the Film Finance Corporation of Australia and ScreenWest. ABC began airing repeats of the series after their original Nine airings in 1994.

== International airings ==
The series was also distributed internationally having been sold to China, Germany, Iceland, Ireland, Israel, The Netherlands, New Zealand, Spain, Poland, Portugal, Latin America, The United Kingdom and The United States.
