= Igor Sas =

Australian actor

Igor Sas is an Australian film, television, and stage actor. He is best known for his work on children's television series such as Parallax, Wormwood, Lockie Leonard, and The Gift. He has also appeared in a number of films, including Japanese Story (2003).

== Early life ==
Sas is the son of Slovak migrants, Maria (née Sprusansky) and Alexander Sas.

== Career ==
=== Screen ===
Sas began his career in 1982 in the Australian soap opera Sons and Daughters. He appeared in multiple episodes of television shows Ship to Shore between 1993 and 1994, The Gift in 1997, and Minty in 1998.

On the big screen, Sas acted alongside Marcus Graham and Kerry Armstrong in 1998's Justice, starred in Bad Credit and Aliens (2001), and played Fraser in the feature film Japanese Story with Toni Collette.

He returned to TV in 2004, portraying Stefan Raddic in Parallax, then Old Squasher in the 2007 Lockie Leonard television series based on the novels of the same name by Tim Winton.

=== Stage ===
Sas is also active in Australian theatre. In 1998, he played numerous characters in Black Russians, and in 2001, he featured in a play titled The Butcher, about a butcher in a country town in decline as its inhabitants move to the city. From 2001 to 2002, he appeared in Yasmina Reza's 'Art' with John Wood and Geoff Kelso, and in 2003, he performed in The Corporal's Wife.

Sas directed the stage version of Closer in 2007, starred in Fragmented, and in Club Gargouille, a production about Quasimodo's half-brother Modo, who runs a cabaret club. In 2008, Sas played multiple characters in an adaptation of Hans Christian Andersen's The Red Shoes, portrayed a bouffon in The York Lynchings, and appeared in The Female of the Species.
