= Broken (Slaughter novel) =

2010 novel by Karin Slaughter

- Author: Karin Slaughter
- Language: English
- Series: Grant County, Georgia
- Genre: Crime fiction
- Publication date: 2010
- Media type: Print

Broken is the seventh book in the Grant County series by author Karin Slaughter. It was originally released in hardback in June 2010. The previous books in the series are Blindsighted, Kisscut, A Faint Cold Fear, Indelible, Faithless and Beyond Reach.

These books feature the characters Sara Linton, Will Trent, and Lena Adams. The audiobook version is narrated by Natalie Ross.

== Plot summary ==
Broken begins with the murder of college student Allison Spooner. When the body is pulled from frigid Lake Grant, detective Lena Adams and her often drunk boss, interim Chief of Police Frank Wallace, follow a trail that leads to the suicide of the prime suspect, Tommy Braham, in his jail cell. The suicide spurs the involvement of Dr. Sara Linton, back in town for Thanksgiving with her family. Still incredibly angry with Lena over her role in Sara's husband's death, and convinced Lena's callous and reckless behavior has led to the possibly innocent suspect's death, Sara calls in back-up from the Georgia Bureau of Investigation. Upon arriving in town, Agent Will Trent immediately meets with resistance from the Grant County Police Department. Despite the roadblocks, he unveils serious errors and deliberate cover-ups in the investigation, perpetrated mainly by Frank Wallace. Soon after, Allison's boyfriend Jason is brutally killed in his dorm room. This definitively points to a murderer still on the loose, clearing Tommy Braham of any lingering suspicion. After discovering a secret link between all three victims, Will and Sara must pull all the pieces together in time to track down the killer.
