= Beyond Reach =

2007 novel by Karin Slaughter

- US book cover
- Author: Karin Slaughter
- Audio read by: Joyce Bean
- Language: English
- Series: Grant County
- Release number: 6
- Genre: Crime fiction
- Set in: Grant County, Georgia
- Publisher: Delacorte Press
- Publication date: July 31, 2007
- Publication place: United States
- Media type: Print; Digital
- Pages: 416 (Hardcover edition)
- ISBN: 978-0385339476
- Preceded by: Faithless
- Website: karinslaughter.com/grant-county/beyond-reach

Beyond Reach is the sixth novel in the Grant County series by Karin Slaughter, originally published in 2007. The previous books in the series are Blindsighted, Kisscut, A Faint Cold Fear, Indelible, and Faithless. Beyond Reach was released in European markets under the title Skin Privilege.

The series features the lead characters Sara Linton, Jeffrey Tolliver, and Lena Adams.

In this book, a main character of the series is impacted in a serious way, which resulted in much controversy and commentary on the event, including spoilers being posted on online book review sites. Slaughter has written a note to her readers about her decision, which is posted on her website.

== Plot summary ==
The Heartsdale Children's Clinic is closed. Sara Linton spends all day being deposed in a malpractice lawsuit filed by the parents of Jimmy Powell, now dead from leukemia, over a technicality. Everything she's built up for the last sixteen years is crumbling as greedy townspeople line up to get in on the action, not realizing their betrayal of her will only result in higher healthcare costs for everyone, or that the nearest pediatrician is 100 miles away. Sara's parents are gone on a cross-country trip and her sister is counseling the homeless in Atlanta. Only her husband, Jeffrey, is there for support. When he's called away to the town of Reese, it's almost a relief to get to go with him, except that they're going because his assistant Lena lies in a hospital with smoke inhalation injuries, under arrest, and suspected of being involved in a murder. She was found beaten badly, watching a torched SUV burn with a body inside it. Reese is Lena's home town, and she came back to check on her uncle Hank, the ex-addict who raised her and her twin sister. She found him mixed up with some unsavory characters and hooked on drugs again after being clean for three decades. Major events from her past are now in question, events that shaped who she is. One of the few things of which she is certain is that Jeffrey and Sara are in terrible danger, and she must get them out of town.

== Alternate book covers ==
Beyond Reach large print

Skin Privilege (UK title)
