= Jessica Barden =

English-American actress (born 1992)

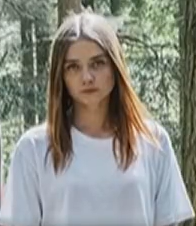
- Barden in 2018
- Born: Jessica Amy Barden; 21 July 1992 (age 34); Northallerton, North Yorkshire, England
- Occupation: Actress
- Years active: 1999–present
- Spouse: Max Winkler (m. 2021)
- Children: 2
- Relatives: Henry Winkler (father-in-law)

Jessica Amy Barden (born 21 July 1992) is an English actress. She began her career as a child actress and gained prominence through her role in the Channel 4 comedy-drama The End of the F***ing World (2017–2019). She received a British Independent Film Award nomination for her performance in Scarborough (2018).

Barden's other films include Tamara Drewe (2010), Hanna (2011), The Lobster (2015), The New Romantic (2018) and Pink Skies Ahead (2020). On television, she has since starred in the Foxtel drama Lambs of God (2019), the Netflix thriller Pieces of Her (2022) and the ITV romantic comedy You & Me (2023).

== Early life ==
Barden was born on 21 July 1992 in Northallerton, North Yorkshire. She comes from a working class background. Her father is a prison officer, and her mother is an accountant; she has two brothers. When she was three, the family moved to Wetherby, West Yorkshire. Barden attended Wetherby High School. She discovered acting through school and her father's love of film. She began taking classes at a local drama club and working as a television extra. She left school at 15.

== Career ==
Barden began her career as a child actress, making her television acting debut in 1999 with a role in an episode of the CITV series My Parents Are Aliens. She later appeared in episodes of the series No Angels and The Chase.

Barden was 14 when she joined the cast of the ITV soap opera Coronation Street, playing Kayleigh Morton from March 2007 until the Morton family's departure from the soap in September 2008. Barden made her film debut in the 2007 comedy-drama Mrs Ratcliffe's Revolution. In 2009, she played Pea in the stage production Jerusalem at the Royal Court Theatre in London, which then transferred to the Apollo Theatre in the West End.

In 2010, Barden appeared in the film Tamara Drewe, a dramatisation of the comic strip of the same name, for which Barden was nominated for Young British Performer of the Year by the London Film Critics' Circle. The following year, she played Sophie in Joe Wright's Hanna. From 2012 to 2014, she had film roles in the horror Comedown, the mystery-drama In the Dark Half, the psychological thriller Mindscape, and the indie Lullaby.

Barden was named a 2015 Screen International Star of Tomorrow. That year, she played Kit Carmichael in the two-part adaptation of Sadie Jones' debut novel The Outcast on BBC One and Liddy in a film adaptation of Thomas Hardy's Far from the Madding Crowd. In 2016, Barden played the titular role of the Channel 4 television film Ellen as well as Jasmine in the comedy film Mindhorn and Justine in the third series of Penny Dreadful on Sky Atlantic. She starred in the 2017 horror film Habit.

Also in 2017, Barden began starring in the Channel 4 and Netflix dark comedy-drama The End of the F***ing World as Alyssa, a role she would play for both series. She starred in the 2018 films The New Romantic, and Scarborough. For the latter, she was nominated for Best Supporting Actress at the British Independent Film Awards, and National Film Awards UK. She won the IMDb Breakout Star Award, and was named a 2018 BAFTA Breakthrough Brit.

Barden appeared in the 2019 music videos for Conan Gray's "Maniac" and Ozzy Osbourne's "Under the Graveyard", as well as the film Jungleland and the Australian Foxtel series Lambs of God. She had lead roles in the 2020 films Holler and Pink Skies Ahead.

In January 2021, it was announced Barden had been cast as Jane in the 2022 Netflix thriller Pieces of Her, an adaptation of Karin Slaughter's novel of the same name.

In 2023, she appeared in the ITV romantic comedy-drama You & Me and the football film An Unsuitable Game.

In May 2024, Barden was cast as Young Valya Harkonnen (played by Emily Watson later in life) in the HBO series Dune: Prophecy.

Barden portrayed Victoria Wood in the 2026 documentary film Becoming Victoria Wood.

Barden provides vocals on the track "Finding Money" on the 2025 album We Will Annihilate Our Enemies by London band Real Lies.

== Personal life ==
Barden married Jungleland director Max Winkler in March 2021. On 19 October 2021, Barden announced she had given birth to their first child, a daughter. On 13 December 2024, Barden announced the birth of their second child.

Barden has opened up about her experiences with anxiety and therapy.

In a 2023 interview with The Daily Telegraph, Barden spoke out against "working class tourism" in acting and against middle and upper class actors who approach working class roles with a condescending or ignorant attitude, specifically calling out Emma Corrin for wanting to do a "gritty" film with an "outrageous accent".

== Filmography ==
=== Film ===
Year	Title	Role	Notes
2007	Mrs Ratcliffe's Revolution	Mary Ratcliffe	
2010	Tamara Drewe	Jody Long	
2011	Hanna	Sophie	
2012	Comedown	Kelly	
2012	In the Dark Half	Marie	
2013	Mindscape	Mousey	
2014	Lullaby	Meredith	
2015	Far from the Madding Crowd	Liddy	
2015	The Lobster	Nosebleed Woman	
2016	Mindhorn	Jasmine	
2017	Habit	Lee	
2018	The New Romantic	Blake Conway	
2018	Scarborough	Beth	
2019	Jungleland	Sky	
2020	Holler	Ruth	
2020	Pink Skies Ahead	Winona	
2024	Hearts of Stone	Agatha	Short film
2026	Becoming Victoria Wood	Victoria Wood	Documentary film

=== Television ===
Year	Title	Role	Notes
1999	My Parents Are Aliens	Girl in School	Episode: "The Date"
2005	No Angels	Lucy	Episode #2.3
2006	The Chase	Amy	Episode #1.2
2007–2008	The Nations Favourite	Kayleigh Morton	Series regular
2011	Comedy Showcase	Barmaid	Episode: "Chickens"
2012	Vera	Stella Macken	Episode: "The Ghost Position"
2013	Coming Up	Ruby	Episode: "Sammy's War"
2013	Chickens	Barmaid / Penny	3 episodes
2015	The Outcast	Kit Carmichael	2 episodes
2016	Murder	Jess	Episode: "The Big Bang"
2016	Ellen	Ellen	Television film
2016	Penny Dreadful	Justine	6 episodes
2017–2019	The End of the F***ing World	Alyssa	Main role
2019	Lambs of God	Sister Carla	4 episodes
2020	Better Things	Herself	2 episodes
2020	Urban Myths	Barbra Streisand	Episode: "When Joan Kissed Barbra"
2021	Robot Chicken	Rey, Additional characters	Voice role; 4 episodes
2022	Pieces of Her	Jane	Main role
2023	You & Me	Emma	Main role
2023–2024	American Horror Stories	Bestie	Episode: "Bestie"
2023–2024	American Horror Stories	Casting Chairwoman	Episode: "Tapeworm"
2023–2024	American Horror Stories	Hailey Doherty	Episode: "Leprechaun"
2024	Dune: Prophecy	Young Valya Harkonnen	
2026	Monster: The Lizzie Borden Story	Nance O’Neil	4 episodes
2027	The Cadburys	Maria Cadbury	

=== Radio ===
Year	Title	Role	Notes
2021	SteelHeads	Joleen	Main role

=== Music videos ===
Year	Artist	Song
2019	Conan Gray	"Maniac"
2019	Ozzy Osbourne	"Under the Graveyard"

== Stage ==
Year	Title	Role	Notes
2018	Night School	Sally	Harold Pinter Theatre, London

== Awards and nominations ==
Year	Award	Category	Nominated work	Result	Ref.
2011	London Critics' Circle Film Awards	Young British Performer of the Year	Tamara Drewe	Nominated	
2015	Screen International	Stars of Tomorrow		Won	
2018	BAFTA	Breakthrough Brit		Won	
2018	IMDb Awards	Breakout Stars Award	The End of the F***ing World, Scarborough, The New Romantic	Won	
2019	British Independent Film Award (BIFA)	Best Supporting Actress	Scarborough	Nominated	
2020	National Film Awards UK	Best Supporting Actress	Scarborough	Nominated	
2020	NME Awards 2020	Best TV Actor		Won	
