= Bella Heathcote =

Australian actress (born 1987)

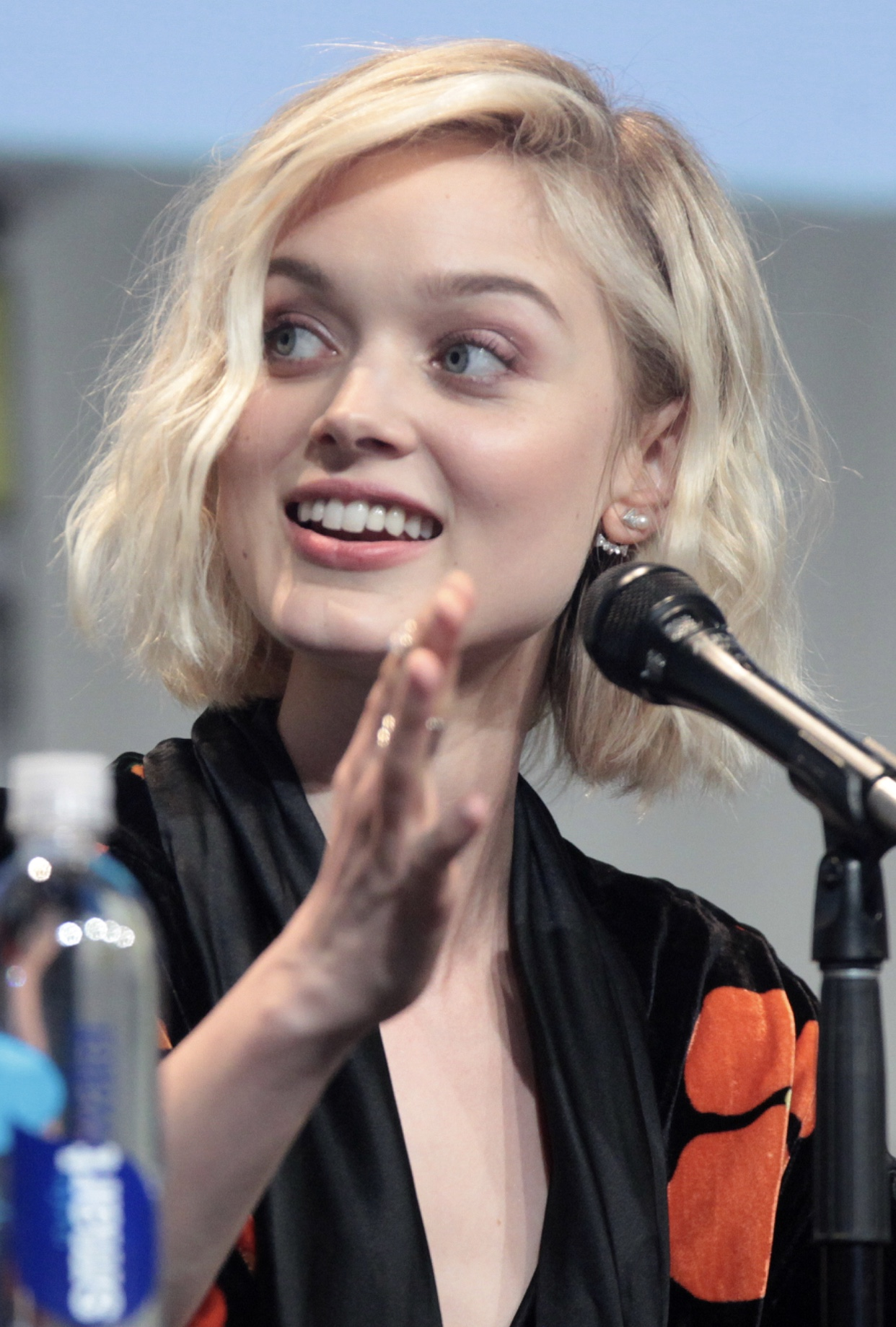
- Heathcote in 2015
- Born: Isabella Heathcote c. May 27, 1987 (age 39); Melbourne, Victoria, Australia
- Education: National Theatre, Melbourne
- Occupation: Actress
- Years active: 2008–present
- Spouse: Richard Stampton (m. 2019)

Isabella Heathcote (born c. 1987) is an Australian actress. Following her film debut in Acolytes (2008), she had a recurring role as Amanda Fowler on the television soap opera Neighbours (2009). She gained further recognition for her dual roles as Victoria Winters and Josette du Pres in the dark fantasy film Dark Shadows (2012), and Olive Byrne in the biographical drama film Professor Marston and the Wonder Women (2017).

Heathcote has since appeared in several films, including In Time (2011), Pride and Prejudice and Zombies, The Neon Demon (both 2016), Fifty Shades Darker (2017), and Relic (2020). On television, she played Nicole Dörmer on the second and third seasons of the Amazon Prime Video dystopian alternate history series The Man in the High Castle (2016–18), Susan Parsons on the Paramount+ historical drama series Strange Angel (2018–19), and Andy Oliver in the Netflix drama thriller series Pieces of Her (2022).

== Early life and education ==
Isabella Heathcote was born about 1987 in Melbourne, Australia. She has two brothers. Her father was a lawyer.

Heathcote attended Korowa Anglican Girls' School. She began attending performance classes when she was 12. Her father believed it would be a good distraction in the wake of her mother's death. Heathcote then studied drama at university, and after her first year realised that she wanted to pursue acting as a career.

== Career ==
Heathcote's early roles include the recurring role of Amanda Fowler in the soap opera Neighbours, and a small appearance in the 2008 horror film Acolytes. Heathcote then appeared in the 2010 Australian war film Beneath Hill 60. In May 2010, she was the recipient of a Heath Ledger Scholarship. She then based herself in Los Angeles for work. In December 2010, she was cast in David Chase's film Not Fade Away (originally titled Twylight Zones). She appeared in the sci-fi thriller In Time, alongside Justin Timberlake and Amanda Seyfried.

Heathcote filmed a cameo appearance for Killing Them Softly (then titled Cogan's Trade), but her scenes were cut from the final film. In February 2011, Tim Burton selected Heathcote to play Victoria Winters and Josette du Pres in his film adaptation of Dark Shadows, starring opposite Johnny Depp, Michelle Pfeiffer, and Helena Bonham Carter. She was later cast in Nicolas Winding Refn's thriller film The Neon Demon, which was released in 2016.

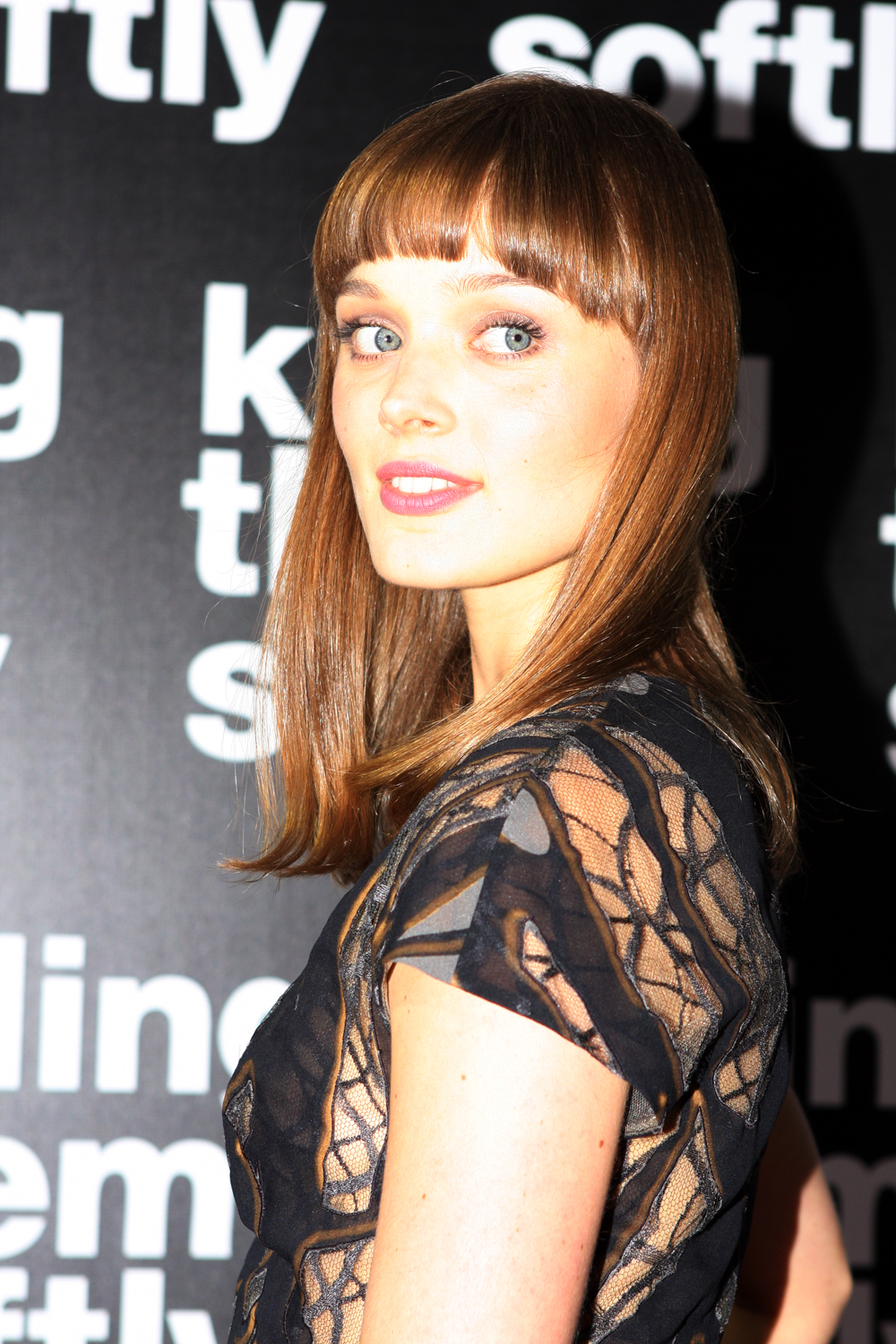
Heathcote at the Sydney premiere of Killing Them Softly in 2012

Heathcote was named one of the 10 Actors to Watch: Breakthrough Performances of 2012 at the 20th Hamptons International Film Festival. The following year, she starred alongside Max Minghella in The Killers' music video for "Shot at the Night". she was part of the Spring/Summer 2014 campaign for Miu Miu alongside fellow actresses Lupita Nyong'o, Elle Fanning and Elizabeth Olsen.

In 2017, Heathcote played Leila Williams in the film Fifty Shades Darker, the sequel to Fifty Shades of Grey. She also joined the season 2 cast of television drama The Man in the High Castle as Nicole Dörmer, a Berlin-born filmmaker. She starred as Olive Byrne, partner of psychologists and comic book authors William Moulton Marston and Elizabeth Holloway Marston, in the 2017 biographical film Professor Marston and the Wonder Women.

She played Susan Parsons in the CBS All Access drama Strange Angel, an adaptation of George Pendle's book Strange Angel: The Otherworldly Life of Rocket Scientist John Whiteside Parsons. It was cancelled after two seasons in November 2019. Heathcote appears in the second season of the Australian web television series Bloom as a younger incarnation of Loris Webb, played by Anne Charleston.

Heathcote appeared in the independent drama Relic, alongside Emily Mortimer and Robyn Nevin. It follows a daughter, a mother and a grandmother who are "haunted by a manifestation of dementia that consumes their family's home". The movie was produced by AGBO Films, the Russo brothers' production company and Jake Gyllenhaal, and co-written and directed by Natalia Erika James. Heathcote stars with Toni Collette in the 2022 Netflix thriller series Pieces of Her, adapted from the Karin Slaughter novel of the same name.

Heathcote stars in the Stan and Nine Network crime drama Scrublands as Mandy Bond, alongside Luke Arnold and Jay Ryan. The series is based on the novel of the same name by Chris Hammer; production began in Victoria in February 2023. In April 2023, Heathcote was cast in the 2025 The Room remake. She also appeared in the six-part Stan Original comedy series C*A*U*G*H*T released in September 2023. On 5 June 2024, it was announced that Heathcote would reprise her role of Mandy Bond for the second season of Scrublands. She will also star alongside Teresa Palmer and Philippa Northeast in the television adaptation of Sally Hepworth's novel The Family Next Door for the ABC. The six-part drama is being filmed in Victoria.

In March 2025, Heathcote joined the main cast of Tulsa King as Cleo Montague for its third season. She will star alongside Jonah Hauer-King, Kristine Froseth, Ellie Bamber, and Leo Suter in Anna Biller's supernatural film The Face of Horror, which begins production in Prague in July 2025.

== Personal life ==
Heathcote was previously engaged to film director Andrew Dominik. They had been in a relationship since 2010. She married Australian architect Richard Stampton in January 2019. She is based in Los Angeles; she and Stampton also have a home in Phillip Island.

== Filmography ==
=== Film ===
Year	Title	Role	Notes	Ref.
2008	Acolytes	Petra		
2010	Beneath Hill 60	Marjorie Waddell	Credited as Isabella Heathcote	
2011	In Time	Michele Weis		
2012	Dark Shadows	Maggie Evans / Victoria Winters / Josette du Pres		
2012	Not Fade Away	Grace Dietz		
2014	The Rewrite	Karen		
2015	The Curse of Downers Grove	Chrissie Swanson		
2016	Pride and Prejudice and Zombies	Jane Bennett		
2016	The Neon Demon	Gigi		
2017	Fifty Shades Darker	Leila Williams		
2017	Professor Marston and the Wonder Women	Olive Byrne		
2020	Relic	Sam		
2024	The Moogai	Becky		
2025	The Room Returns!	Lisa		
TBA	The Face of Horror	Isabel		

=== Television ===
Year	Title	Role	Notes	Ref.
2009	Neighbours	Amanda Fowler	Recurring role, 8 episodes	
2016–2018	The Man in the High Castle	Nicole Dörmer	Main role (seasons 2–3)	
2018–2019	Strange Angel	Susan Parsons	Main role	
2020	Bloom	Young Loris	Main role (season 2)	
2020	Awkwafina Is Nora from Queens	Joey	1 episode	
2022	Pieces of Her	Andy Oliver	Main role	
2023–	Scrublands	Mandy Bond	Main role	
2023	Caught	Jemima Justice	Main role	
2025	Tulsa King	Cleo Montague	8 episodes	
2025	The Family Next Door	Ange	TV series	
