= Jacob Scipio =

Guyanese/British actor and writer

- Scipio in 2024
- Born: Jacob Muntaz Scipio; Islington, London, England
- Occupations: Actor, Writer
- Years active: 2008–present

Jacob Muntaz Scipio (/ˈsɪpioʊ/) is a British actor and writer. Scipio's acting career started in television with leading roles in Some Girls (BBC), As the Bell Rings (Disney) and White Teeth (Channel 4). In 2016, Scipio co-founded CPO Productions. In that time he has written and starred in Cowboys & Angels (2016) and The Writers Group (2018), short films that premiered at the Cannes Court Métrage and London screenings at the British Film Institute.

In 2020, he played Armando Aretas in the action comedy Bad Boys for Life directed by Adil El Arbi and Bilall Fallah and starring Will Smith and Martin Lawrence. He returned for the role in its sequel, the 2024 action comedy Bad Boys: Ride or Die, also directed by Adil and Bilall.

== Education, early life and career ==
Scipio was born in Islington, London, England, and is of Guyanese ancestry. Scipio attended St. Michael's Church of England Primary School in Highgate, then continued his studies at Fortismere School in Muswell Hill, going on to complete his education at the University of Essex where he earned a Bachelor of Arts degree in Film and Literature.

Scipio's acting career began when he landed his first role at the age of 9 months in an episode of the Screen One series entitled Bambino Mio, playing the adopted son of Julie Walters. Throughout his studies he continued to act, starring in a number of lead roles in television, film and theatre, including the Channel 4 adaptation of Zadie Smith’s White Teeth, where at age 9 he played the roles of twin brothers ‘Millat’ and ‘Magid’. He continued to act, appearing in Rodgers and Hammerstein's The King and I as ‘Prince Chulalongkorn’ opposite Elaine Paige at the London Palladium.

== Film career ==
In January 2020, Scipio played the lead villain, Armando Aretas, in Bad Boys for Life, a role he reprised in the 2024 film Bad Boys: Ride or Die. A few months later he starred in The Outpost, a true story of American soldiers in the Battle of Kamdesh. Scipio played Justin T. Gallegos, a US army Staff Sgt. who was awarded the Distinguished Service Cross.

Scipio appeared in Last Looks and Without Remorse. Scipio was later cast in the 2023 film Expend4bles.

== Television career ==
In 2008, Scipio played the role of Bip in the second series of As the Bell Rings. His next role came in the form of the 'Kerwhizzitor' in the popular CBeebies show Kerwhizz, where he hosts the show then comments on the race. Scipio then went on to star in the 2012 Life In My Shoes production Undefeated, a HIV awareness campaign that was screened at the 2012 Cannes Film Festival in the Short Film Corner. In 2013 he played the role of 'Tyler Blaine' in the second series of the hit BBC Three comedy Some Girls. Other roles include 'Lewis' in CBBC's "Dixi", and 'Thomas Hillmorton', a Shakespearean ghost in "Dani's Castle" which aired on 1 September 2015. which was released in 2014.

In January 2021, it was announced that Scipio was cast as Michael Vargas in the upcoming Netflix thriller series Pieces of Her, which is adapted from the Karin Slaughter novel of the same name.

== Filmography ==
=== Film ===
Year	Title	Role	Notes
2020	Bad Boys for Life	Armando Aretas	
2020	The Outpost	Staff Sergeant Justin T. Gallegos	
2021	Without Remorse	Hatchet	
2022	Last Looks	Don Q	
2022	The Unbearable Weight of Massive Talent	Carlos	
2023	Expend4bles	Galan	
2024	Bad Boys: Ride or Die	Armando Aretas	
2025	Maintenance Required	Beau	
2026	Passenger	Tyler Genocchio	
2026	Onslaught	Griffin	

=== Television ===
Year	Title	Role	Notes
2022	Pieces of Her	Michael Vargas	Main role
