= Faithless (Slaughter novel) =

2005 novel by Karin Slaughter

- Author: Karin Slaughter
- Language: English
- Series: Grant County, Georgia
- Genre: Crime fiction
- Publisher: Delacorte Press
- Publication date: 2005
- Media type: Print
- Pages: 393
- ISBN: 978-0385339452
- LC Class: PS3569.L275 F354

Faithless is the fifth novel in the Grant County, Georgia series by author Karin Slaughter. It was originally published in hardback in 2005. It was a #1 The Times bestseller. Previous books in the series are Blindsighted, Kisscut, A Faint Cold Fear, and Indelible. These books star Sara Linton, Jeffrey Tolliver, and Lena Adams.

== Summary ==
Sara and Jeffrey have finally started to click again when a phone call from the woman he was unfaithful with brings their affair back into sharp relief. He and Sara are arguing about this on a walk in the woods when they make a discovery: the corpse of a young woman who was buried alive in a wooden coffin. They assume her death was accidental, but the autopsy reveals that she was pregnant and had been murdered – while she was underground. The search for her identity leads Jeffrey and Lena to an organic soybean farming cooperative out in the sticks owned by a large, tightly knit, religious family, led by the charismatic oldest son. They import their labor force from the people that populate Atlanta's shelters and halfway houses, facilitated through the family church's outreach program. At one time or another the case involves strippers, the one-legged, one-eyed lawyer extraordinaire Buddy Conford, an abused woman Lena both identifies with and wants to save, and a search to find more buried coffins before it's too late. At the novel's conclusion, Sara finally agrees to remarry Jeffrey after at least four proposals, and Ethan pushes Lena so far that she decides it's time to escape.
