= Fallen (Slaughter novel) =

2011 novel by Karin Slaughter

- First edition (US)
- Author: Karin Slaughter
- Language: English
- Series: Georgia Series
- Genre: Crime fiction
- Publisher: Delacorte Press (US); Century (UK)
- Publication date: June 2011
- Media type: Print

Fallen is a novel by bestselling author Karin Slaughter that combines characters from her Will Trent series and Grant County series. It is her eleventh full-length novel. It was originally released in hardback in June 2011. Her other novels that combine the Will Trent and Grant County series are Undone and Broken.

== Plot summary ==
Agent Faith Mitchell is late leaving a training workshop with the GBI. She was supposed to pick up her baby at noon, but there's no answer at her mother's house. Retired Atlanta Police Captain Evelyn Mitchell never leaves the house without letting someone know-especially when she's babysitting her daughter's child. Faith's worries turn to serious concern as her mother fails to answer numerous phone calls. She arrives at Evelyn's house to find a bloody handprint on the front door, a gory and chaotic crime scene, and her mother kidnapped. Finding Evelyn becomes the number one task of Amanda Wagner, a deputy director for the GBI as well as Evelyn's close friend. She brings Faith's partner Agent Will Trent onto the case to help her run a shadow investigation. Suspicions point to the members of Evelyn's former narcotics team, all of whom were convicted of corruption after skimming money off the top of drug raids; however, a lead from a nosy neighbor regarding a gentleman friend who visited Evelyn several times a week provides an alternate avenue of theories for the case. During all of this turmoil, Dr. Sara Linton and Will Trent's relationship appears to be growing as Sara is drawn further into the case. While Faith struggles to cope with the unimaginable situation, Amanda and Will chase leads and suspects throughout the criminal underbelly of the state of Georgia, hoping to find Evelyn Mitchell and apprehend her kidnappers before it's too late.
