= Aaron Jeffery =

New Zealand-Australian actor

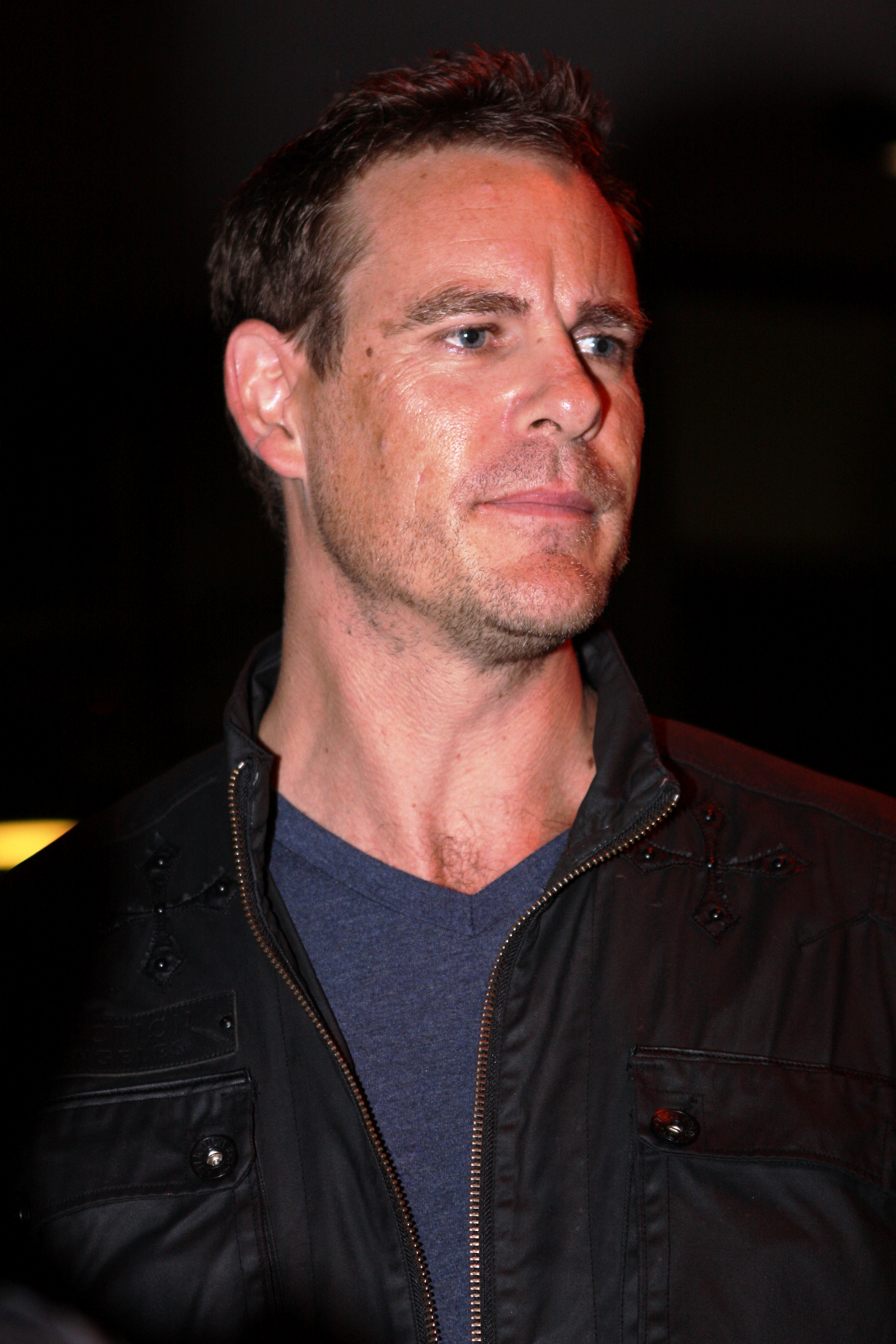
- Born: Aaron C. Jeffery; Auckland, New Zealand
- Occupation: Actor
- Years active: 1993–present
- Notable work: Water Rats (1996–1998); McLeod's Daughters (2001–2008); Wentworth (2013–2015)
- Spouse: Melinda Medich (m. 2003–2005)
- Partner: Zoe Naylor (2010–present)
- Children: 3

Aaron C. Jeffery is a Logie Award-winning New Zealand-Australian actor. He is best known for his roles as Terry Watson in Water Rats, as Alex Ryan in McLeod's Daughters, and as Matt 'Fletch' Fletcher in Wentworth.

== Career ==
After graduating in 1993 from the National Institute of Dramatic Art (NIDA), Jeffery began his television career on the children's programme Ship to Shore. Jeffery is best known for his role as Alex Ryan in the drama McLeod's Daughters, which he left in 2008.

Jeffery appeared in the underworld crime series Underbelly: Badness as Frank. He wrapped filming on 22 June. Three days later, it was announced Jeffery had joined the cast of Neighbours as Bradley Fox for two months. In October, it was revealed that Jeffery had been cast as a corrections officer in the series Wentworth. He also starred in the Bevan Lee series Between Two Worlds for the Seven Network.

In 2021 Jeffery appeared in the AACTA-nominated film Moon Rock For Monday directed by Kurt Martin. The film was nominated for Best Indie Film at the 11th Annual AACTA Awards.

In April 2021, it was announced that Jeffery had been cast in the Netflix thriller series Pieces of Her, which is adapted from the Karin Slaughter novel of the same name.

In July 2024, Jeffery began appearing in the recurring guest role of James "Jimmy" Fowler in the soap opera Home and Away. On 4 November 2026, Jeffrey was named in the cast for the 2027 season of Black Snow.

== Production company ==
In 2015 Jeffery and Naylor founded their production company Eagle Rose Productions.

== Awards ==
In both 2004 and 2007, Jeffery won the Silver Logie for Most Popular Actor in a Drama Series for his role on McLeod’s Daughters.

== Personal life ==
In 2005, Jeffery was charged with common assault against his former partner. He was ordered to undergo anger management.

Jeffery has been in a relationship since 2010 with Zoe Naylor, his former McLeod's Daughters co-star. The couple had their first child together, a daughter, in 2012. Jeffery also has a daughter from a previous relationship.

== Filmography ==
=== Film ===
Year	Title	Role	Notes
1997	Square One	Jeremy Hostick	Feature film
1998	The Interview	Detective Senior Constable Wayne Prior	Feature film
1999	Strange Planet	Joel	Feature film
2009	Beautiful	Sergeant Alan Hobson	Feature film
2009	X-Men Origins: Wolverine	Thomas Logan	Feature film
2014	Locks of Love	Terry Knox	
2015	Turbo Kid	Frederick	Feature film
2017	Rip Tide	Owen	Feature film
2018	Occupation	Major Davis	Feature film
2019	Palm Beach	Doug	Feature film
2021	Moon Rock For Monday	Bob	Feature film

=== Television ===
Year	Title	Role	Notes
1993	Ship to Shore	Nick	9 episodes
1994	The Damnation of Harvey McHugh	Brandon	Episode: "A Tree Grows in Botswana"
1995	Fire	Firefighter Richard 'Banjo' Gates	12 episodes
1995	Blue Murder	Constable Bobby Williams	2 episodes
1996–1998	Water Rats	Constable Terry Watson	42 episodes
1998	Wildside	Walter Chowdrey	Episode: "1.34"
2000	Murder Call	Rory Simmons	Episode: "Last Act"
2001–2008	McLeod's Daughters	Alex Ryan	190 episodes
2007	Outrageous Fortune	Gary Savage	15 episodes
2008	The Strip	Detective Jack Cross	13 episodes
2011	Underbelly Files: The Man Who Got Away	Geoff Leyland	TV movie
2011	East West 101	Hunter	3 episodes
2011	Wild Boys	Captain Moonlite / Preacher Scott	Episode: "1.5"
2012	Miss Fisher's Murder Mysteries	Samson	Episode: "Blood and Circuses"
2012	Underbelly: Badness	Frank 'Tink' O'Rourke	4 episodes
2012	Cancerman: The Milan Brych Affair	Dr. John Scott	TV movie documentary
2012	Neighbours	Bradley Fox	21 episodes
2013–2015	Wentworth	Matt "Fletch" Fletcher	33 episodes
2014	Old School	Rick	2 episodes
2015	Step Dave	Warren Robinson	3 episodes
2015	Texas Rising: The Last Soldier	Ranger	3 episodes
2016	Janet King	Simon Hamilton	3 episodes
2017	Blue Murder: Killer Cop	Chris Bronowski	Episode: "Part One"
2018	Underbelly Files: Chopper	Mark "Chopper" Read	2 episodes
2022	Pieces of Her	Nick Harp	Recurring role
2024-present	Home and Away	James Fowler	Guest role
2026	Shortland Street	Daniel Hudson	Guest role; 2 episodes
2027	Black Snow	Steven Knox	TV series
