= Scrublands (TV series) =

Australian TV series

- Genre: Drama
- Based on: Scrublands by Chris Hammer
- Directed by: Greg McLean
- Starring: Luke Arnold; Bella Heathcote; Jay Ryan; Toby Truslove; Robert Taylor
- Country of origin: Australia
- Original language: English
- No. of seasons: 2
- No. of episodes: 8

Production
- Executive producers: Amanda Duthie; Michael Healy; Caliah Scolbie; Andy Ryan
- Producers: Ian Collie; Rob Gibson
- Production company: Easy Tiger Productions

Original release
- Network: Stan
- Release: 16 November 2023 – present

Scrublands is an Australian drama series that is based on the novel written by Chris Hammer. Produced by Easy Tiger Productions, the first season premiered on 16 November 2023 on Stan. The series follows journalist Martin Scarsden, who is following what he believes to be a simple story on the town on the anniversary of a town tragedy. With nothing as it seems, Martin digs deep to reveal the truth behind what happened. A second season of Scrublands premiered on 17 April 2025.

== Plot ==
A small isolated town is rocked by tragedy after a local priest shoots dead five parishioners. As the community continues to grieve, journalist Martin Scarsden finds himself in town, in what he thinks will be a simple story about the tragedy. However, what unfolds after finding out the truth will push Martin to his limits.

In season two, Martin returns to his childhood town of Silver. When he returns home with his new partner Mandy, he finds his best friend dead and his partner Mandy as the main suspect, he pushes to find out the truth of what really happened, the past is dredged up in a town that has tried to keep the past in the past.

== Cast and characters ==
=== Main ===
- Luke Arnold as Martin Scarsden
- Bella Heathcote as Mandy Bond
- Sarah Roberts as Beth Ramachandaran
- Toby Truslove as Doug Monkton

=== Season 1 (Scrublands) ===
- Jay Ryan as Byron Swift
- Robert Taylor as Harley Reagan
- Martin Copping as Craig Landers
- Adam Zwar as Robbie Haws-Jones
- Fletcher Humphrys as Alf Newkirk

=== Season 2 (Scrublands: Silver) ===
Season two cast were named when the series was renewed on 5 June 2024, with Arnold and Heathcote both reprising their roles from the first series.

- Debra Lawrance as Denise Speight
- Luke Caroll as Scotty Waaliti / Wesley Patten as Teen Scotty
- Ezra Justin as Teen Martin
- David Roberts as Vern Jones
- Luke Pegler as Nick Poulos
- Joel Jackson as Garth McGrath
- Hamish Michael as Jasper Speight / Griffin Zardo as Teen Jasper
- Damian de Montemas as Tyson St Clair
- Megan Hollier as Keira
- Caroline Brazier as Jennifer 'Jay Jay' Hayes

=== Season 3 (Scrublands: Trust) ===
Season three cast were announced on 17 July 2026 when the series was renewed for a third season.

- Lincoln Younes as Tom Molloy
- Nicholas Bell as Max Fuller
- Danielle Cormack

== Episodes ==
=== Season 1 (2023) ===
No. in Series	Title	Directed by	Written by	Air date	Ref	Channel 9 airdate	Viewers	Ref
1	Episode 1	Greg McLean	Felicity Packard	16 November 2023		18 March 2025	574,000	
2	Episode 2	Greg McLean	Kelsey Munro	16 November 2023		19 March 2025	510,000	
3	Episode 3	Greg McLean	Jock Serong	16 November 2023		25 March 2025	431,000	
4	Episode 4	Greg McLean	Felicity Packard	16 November 2023		26 March 2025	460,000	

=== Season 2 (Silver) (2025) ===
No. in series	Title	Directed by	Written by	Air date	Ref
5	Episode 1	Ben Young	Felicity Packard	17 April 2025	
6	Episode 2	Ben Young	Fiona Kelly	17 April 2025	
7	Episode 3	Ben Young	Jock Serong	17 April 2025	
8	Episode 4	Ben Young	Felicity Packard	17 April 2025	

== Production ==
The series is based on the novel written by Chris Hammer. Production of the series was announced on 27 February 2023 as a joint filming commission between Stan and the Nine Network, with filming taking place in Victoria. Luke Arnold, Bella Heathcote, and Jay Ryan were cast in the lead roles. Greg McLean directed the series, with Felicity Packard, Kelsey Munro, and Jock Serong as writers. Season 1 was produced by Easy Tiger.

BBC acquired the rights to air the show in the UK. US broadcaster AMC announced in April 2024 that it had acquired the rights for the series.

In March 2024 a second season was announced. In June 2024, it was announced that filming would be moving from Victoria to Western Australia. Scrublands Season 2 was filmed in various locations across Western Australia.

On 17 July 2026, Stan announced a third series was in production, with production moving from Western Australia and filming taking place in Sydney.

== Release ==
The first season premiered on 16 November 2023 on Stan and was aired on BBC Four in the UK in the same month, it also aired on AMC from 2 May 2024.

The second season premiered on 17 April 2025. On 10 March 2025, the free-to-air channel Channel 9 announced it would be airing the first season from 18 March 2025.

== Reception ==
Luke Buckmaster of The Guardian rated the first season of the series 4 stars, saying the story can be a "bit pulpy", but that it was a rock solid addition to "rural noir". David Knox of TV Tonight also rated the series 4 stars. Knox said that while the four episodes make for a slow burn, it remained engaging with the cast and story.
