= The Dark Half (disambiguation) =

The Dark Half is the title of a 1989 horror novel by Stephen King.

The Dark Half may also refer to:

- The Dark Half (film), a 1993 film based on the Stephen King novel
- Dark Half (video game), a Super Nintendo Entertainment System game

== See also ==
- In the Dark Half, a 2011 British drama film
