= Pieces of Her (TV series) =

American thriller drama streaming television series

- Genre: Thriller; Drama
- Created by: Charlotte Stoudt
- Based on: Pieces of Her by Karin Slaughter
- Directed by: Minkie Spiro
- Starring: Toni Collette; Bella Heathcote; Jacob Scipio; Omari Hardwick; David Wenham; Jessica Barden; Joe Dempsie
- Music by: Saunder Jurriaans and Danny Bensi
- Country of origin: United States
- Original language: English
- No. of seasons: 1
- No. of episodes: 8

Production
- Executive producers: Charlotte Stoudt; Janice Williams; Minkie Spiro; Bruna Papandrea; Steve Hutensky; Lesli Linka Glatter; Casey Haver; Karin Slaughter
- Producers: Sharon Hoffman; Dan LeFranc; Toni Collette; Louisa Kors; Anne M. Uemura
- Cinematography: Ole Birkeland
- Editors: Michael Ruscio; Mako Kamitsuna; Adoma Ananeh-Firempong
- Camera setup: Single-camera
- Running time: 42–62 minutes
- Production companies: Red Shoes Pictures; Made Up Stories

Original release
- Network: Netflix
- Release: March 4, 2022

Pieces of Her is an American thriller drama television series created by Charlotte Stoudt, based on the 2018 novel of the same name by Karin Slaughter. The series stars Toni Collette, Bella Heathcote, Jacob Scipio, Omari Hardwick, and David Wenham. It premiered on Netflix on March 4, 2022.

Between February 27, 2022, and April 3, 2022, the series was watched for 227.5 million hours on Netflix, globally, according to Netflix top 10s.

== Premise ==
Pieces of Her follows the story of Andy (Bella Heathcote), a 30-year-old woman who is caught in a deadly shooting at a local diner. Moments later, she witnesses her mother, Laura (Toni Collette), violently eliminate the threat with ease. As Andy begins to unravel her mother's actions on that day, her perspective on their entire familial relationship takes a new turn. Soon, figures from her mother's past reappear, and she is forced to escape. On the journey, she attempts to find the truth that her mother buried long ago.

== Cast and characters ==
=== Main ===
- Toni Collette as Laura Oliver, a speech pathologist and breast cancer survivor living in Belle Isle, Georgia, who has a dark past; it is later revealed that her real name is Jane Queller
- Bella Heathcote as Andy Oliver, Laura's daughter, who moved back to Georgia take care of her mother
- Jacob Scipio as Michael Vargas, a U.S. Marshal who has been protecting Andy
- Omari Hardwick as Gordon Oliver, Laura's ex-husband and Andy's stepfather
- David Wenham as Jasper Queller, the current CEO of Quellcorp
- Jessica Barden as Jane Queller, Laura's younger self in the late 1980s, who was daughter of a powerful pharmaceutical CEO
- Joe Dempsie as young Nick Harp, Jane's former lover and the leader of a domestic terrorist group, Army of the Changing World, in the late 1980s

=== Recurring ===
- Gil Birmingham as Charlie Bass, Laura's Witness Protection Program handler
- Terry O'Quinn as Martin Queller, the founder and former CEO of Quellcorp, and the Queller siblings' father
- Aaron Jeffery as Nick Harp (present day), Andy's biological father, who has been on the run for 30 years
- Nicholas Burton as Andrew Queller, Martin's son, Jane and Jasper's brother
- Calum Worthy as Jasper's younger self in the late 1980s
- Ewen Leslie as Arthur Gibson
- Catherine McClements as Grace Juno

=== Guests ===
- Ben O'Toole as Young Ali Wexler
- Daniel Amalm as Lean Man
- Genevieve Lemon as Gloria
- Josef Ber as Detective Shooltz
- Lasarus Ratuere as Felix Spears
- Ling-Hsueh Tang as U.S. Marshall

== Production ==
=== Development ===
On February 5, 2019, it was announced that Netflix had given the production an 8-episode series order. The series was created by Charlotte Stoudt, who also serves as showrunner and is executive producer, along with Lesli Linka Glatter and Bruna Papandrea. Production companies involved with the series consist of Made Up Stories and Endeavor Content. Stoudt is also credited as a writer, whilst Minkie Spiro directed all eight episodes. The series premiered on March 4, 2022.

=== Casting ===
In February 2020, Toni Collette and Bella Heathcote were cast in starring roles. In May 2020, it was announced that David Wenham was cast in a main role. In January 2021, Jacob Scipio, Omari Hardwick, Jessica Barden, and Joe Dempsie joined the main cast. In February 2021, Gil Birmingham, Terry O’Quinn and Calum Worthy joined the cast in recurring roles. In April 2021, Nicholas Burton and Aaron Jeffery were cast in recurring capacities.

=== Filming ===
Principal photography for the series was originally expected to begin on March 16, 2020, and conclude on July 17, 2020, in Burnaby, British Columbia. Following an AU$21.58 million investment from the Australian Government, shared with the production of Spiderhead to boost the local economy during the COVID-19 pandemic, the production was lured to Sydney, Australia, where filming took place in early 2021.

== Episodes ==
No.	Title	Directed by	Written by	Original release date
1	"Episode 1"	Minkie Spiro	Teleplay by : Charlotte Stoudt	March 4, 2022
Briefly shown is a young girl hiding inside of a run down wooden structure. While Andrea (Andy) and Laura have lunch at a diner, a young man shoots a young woman, her mother, and a random man. Mistaking Andy's 911 uniform for a police uniform, he prepares to shoot her. Laura begs him to shoot her instead, but when he misses his last shot, he embeds a knife through Laura's hand; she waves the hand to slit his throat. Laura tells Andy she is afraid “he” is coming, and asks Andy not to speak to the police. A man at a large estate is seen saying “we’ve got a problem, it’s her” on a phone. Waking up in the middle of the night, Andy sees a man enter into the house. She knocks him unconscious as he tries to suffocate Laura. Laura gives Andy a bag with money, a key card, and a phone. She tells Andy to drive the man's car to a storage unit in Georgia, where she has another car, then drive to Camden, ME and to wait for her call. While rushing to find the attacker's car, Andy notices a rabbit's foot hanging from the rear view of a nearby vehicle, then she drives into the night.
2	"Episode 2"	Minkie Spiro	Anna Fishko	March 4, 2022
After stopping at a gas station and buying supplies, the cashier notices the blood on her hand when handing her the change, she awkwardly rushes out to the truck, and washes the blood off while being watched by the cashier. Arriving in Carrollton Andy uses a library computer to look up directions to the Get-Em-Go and to Camden. On her way out she notices a hooded man peering into the window of the truck, she rushes out the rear fire exit and finds her way to the storage unit while the hooded man heads into the library. Once at the storage unit she find her mother's old wagon, with a gun in the glove box, some supplies in the hatch, and a suitcase of a large amount of cash with several fake IDs and a photo of her mothers youth that shows the cut that formed her mothers scar. Continuing her trip, she checks into a small motel for the night. Meanwhile, her mother reaches out to her ex husband, Gordon, for help, when he arrives she shows him the intruder tied up in a closet. Asking for his help to get them to the intruders meet point hoping to catch a glimpse at who he’s meeting. He reluctantly agrees, though along the way the attacker dies in the car. Gordon sends Laura home in a cab so he can bury the body alone. Racked by questions of her mothers past, Andy goes to a bar across the street where she confides in a stranger the feelings regarding her mother's secrets before asking to teach her to use the gun she found in the car, he reluctantly agrees. Meanwhile, her mother is desperate for a way to reach the man from her past who wants her dead, reaches out to the reporter in the news van outside her home, and agrees to an interview on the Today Show the next morning. After learning to shoot, Andy and the man walk to his truck together where she notices the same rabbit’s foot hanging, panicked, she heads to the motel room, continually checking over her shoulder only to see him watching her the whole way, once inside she quickly reloads the handgun, unsure of what’s next.
3	"Episode 3"	Minkie Spiro	Sharon Hoffman	March 4, 2022
4	"Episode 4"	Minkie Spiro	Dan LeFranc	March 4, 2022
5	"Episode 5"	Minkie Spiro	Jerome Hairston & Sharon Hoffman	March 4, 2022
6	"Episode 6"	Minkie Spiro	Anna Fishko & Dan LeFranc	March 4, 2022
7	"Episode 7"	Minkie Spiro	Michelle Denise Jackson	March 4, 2022
8	"Episode 8"	Minkie Spiro	Charlotte Stoudt	March 4, 2022

== Reception ==
The review aggregator website Rotten Tomatoes reported a 50% approval rating with an average rating of 5.7/10, based on 34 critic reviews. The website's critics consensus reads, "While Toni Collette heroically tries to bring Pieces of Her together, this lumbering mystery is too bogged down by backstory to satisfyingly cohere." Metacritic, which uses a weighted average, assigned a score of 52 out of 100 based on 18 critics, indicating "mixed or average reviews".

Angie Han writing for The Hollywood Reporter praised Collette's performance throughout the series as "fascinating to watch". Han also noted that the series eventually "loses steam" after the first three episodes, describing Heathcote's character as merely "a mechanism propelling the narrative forward" with little to no character development.
