= Fractured (novel) =

2008 novel by Karin Slaughter

- Author: Karin Slaughter
- Audio read by: Kathleen Early
- Language: English
- Series: Will Trent
- Release number: 2
- Genre: Crime fiction
- Set in: Atlanta, Georgia
- Publisher: Delacorte Press
- Publication date: July 29, 2008
- Publication place: United States
- Media type: Print; Digital
- Pages: 400 (Hardcover edition)
- ISBN: 978-0385341950
- Preceded by: Triptych
- Followed by: Undone
- Website: karinslaughter.com/fractured

Fractured is the second novel in the Atlanta series from bestselling author Karin Slaughter, published in 2008. The first instalment in the series is Triptych and the following one is Undone. The series follows Will Trent, a dyslexic Georgia Bureau of Investigation agent. The books also feature the characters Angie Polaski and Faith Mitchell. Slaughter also writes the Grant County series. The audiobook is narrated by Kathleen Early.

== Plot summary ==
Six months before the events of the novel, Atlanta homicide detective Faith Mitchell's mother, a police captain, was the focus of an investigation that resulted in her retirement and the firing of six narcotics officers. Although the outcome was justified, the police are protective of their own, and Faith, along with the rest of the Atlanta police force, resents the man responsible, GBI agent Will Trent. Faith and Will are assigned to a murder and kidnapping case involving some of the wealthiest and most powerful families in the city, and neither is pleased with the pairing. Faith gradually discovers that Will is not the person she believed him to be and that he is a highly skilled detective. Their investigation takes them from the dormitories of Georgia Tech to one of Atlanta's exclusive private academies, as they try to prevent another murder.
