= Lad Ash =

Studio album by Real Lies
- Released: 22 April 2022
- Genres: Electronica; electropop; synth-pop
- Label: Unreal
- Producer: Real Lies

Real Lies chronology
Real Life (2015)	Lad Ash (2022)	We Will Annihilate Our Enemies (2025)

Lad Ash is the second studio album by London band Real Lies, released on 22 April 2022 through Unreal Records.

== Reception ==
Professional ratings
Review scores
Source	Rating
Loud and Quiet	7/10 stars
God Is in the TV	8/10 stars
Mondo Sonoro	8/10 stars

The album has received favourable reviews. Luke Turner of The Quietus called it "the first great London record of the year", and the publication went on to name it as number 23 in their albums of the year so far and 18 in their Top 100 albums of the year chart.Rolling Stone added that since their first record, "the mixture of euphoria, melancholy, bittersweetness, and yearning that defines their music has only grown bigger in scope." Dazed mentioned that "the record is a more coherent and sophisticated work than its predecessor Real Life... borne of disaster, failure and loss, Real Lies' new album Lad Ash, transfigures these things into something beautiful." Paste named it a Best New Album, and said "synth-pop that you can sink yourself into...as nostalgic as it is futuristic, with a sophisticated U.K. club edge that sets them apart from their contemporaries." KEXP called Lad Ash "a brilliant set of addictive, cinematic, nostalgia-soaked electronic-pop that fuses Kharas' distinctive spoken-word vocal delivery with richly textured rhythms that sway from cerebral techno jams to gauzy post-rave soundscapes". Hua Hsu included it in his 2022 My Year In Listening review for The New Yorker, stating that '“Lad Ash” is a fantastic collection of London night-life sketches, by equal turns hopeful and haunted.' Nialler9 named it as the 23rd best album of 2022, and God Is In The TV named it their 8th best.

== Track listing ==
All songs were produced by Real Lies

No.	Title	Writer(s)	Length
1.	"Ethos"	Kevin Lee Kharas; Patrick King	3:33
2.	"Boss Trick"	Kharas; King	4:47
3.	"An Oral History of My First Kiss"	Kharas; King	5:02
4.	"Dream On"	Kharas; King	5.36
5.	"Late Arcades"	Kharas; King	5:53
6.	"Thameslink Tryst"	Kharas; King; Thomas MacDonald	2:41
7.	"Dolphin Junction"	Kharas; King	4:59
8.	"All Good Dogs"	Kharas; King; MacDonald	3:36
9.	"Since I"	Kharas; Thomas Watson	5:21
10.	"The Carousel"	Kharas; King	4:45
11.	"Your Guiding Hand"	Kharas; King; Kent Tonning	6:11
12.	"DiCaprio"	Kharas; King; MacDonald	4:08
Total length:			56:39

== Personnel and credits ==
- Kevin Lee Kharas – arranger (1, 3-4, 6-8, 10, 12)
- Patrick King – arranger (1, 3-4, 6-8, 10, 12)
- Real Lies – producer (all tracks)
