= List of Shortland Street characters introduced in 2026 =

The following is a list of characters that first appeared in the New Zealand soap opera Shortland Street in 2026.

== Cody Munroe ==
Cody Munroe
- Shortland Street character
- Portrayed by: Jordan Mooney
- Duration: 2026–present
- First appearance: 16 February 2026
- Introduced by: Oliver Driver
In-universe information
- Occupation: Nurse

Cody Munroe, played by Jordan Mooney, made his first appearance in 2026. Cody arrives at the hospital alongside Cindy Te Toka and "Ash James" on their first day at work surprising Maeve as they were all juniors. while been showing around he meets Sage Stewart who he is instantly taken with. during Logan and Dawns engagement party the two sleep together and they later begin a relationship, later having doubts about workplace relationship Sage he clarified to Cody that what they had was only casual, upsetting Cody. He later has a one-night stand with Izzy Dove in the shower locker room. A few weeks later Sage plans to tell him he wants their relationship to be more serious he apologises for sleeping with Izzy, which lead to them kissing, and they decide to make things exclusive. it was later revealed that he had a twin brother Toby who died three years from terminal cancer After Marianne snapped at him in ED he retaliated the following day by pushing her down the stairs. In May he begin to clash with new surgeon Arlo Wright and clashed with Chris after he refuse to help him with a patient and storms out mid-shift and tells Sage that tells him with was Chris who "killed" his brother. After Arlo is suspended from the hospital he bumps into him outside. Arlo asks Cody for a drink, and when Cody turns him down responds with crude remarks, asking if he is "on the rag". He then questions whether he fancies him, Arlo walks away, he follows him into carpark strikes him with a swift blow to the head, leaving Arlo bleeding on the ground. Chris later founds Cody and they talk about his brother and he remember hims and lets him know he can always talk about his brother with him. In July Sage and Cody go camping for his birthday Although Cody had originally told Sage that he wanted to go alone, he later changed his mind and invited him along. The next morning they wake up and discover their tent to discover that their belongings have been taken. They came cross dishevelled man and his behaviour gives them an eerie feeling fairing they will be murdered that night. their suspicions grow when they discover the man has been eating their food and keeps referring to them as his boys the pair decided to run only to corner by the man campsite less than a metre away. Later that night while the bushman is asleep his tent he strangles him to death.

== Tyler Hudson ==
Tyler Hudson
- Shortland Street character
- Portrayed by: Caleb Jonte Edwards
- Duration: 2026–present
- First appearance: 16 February 2026
- Introduced by: Oliver Driver
In-universe information
- Other names: Ash James
- Occupation: Nurse
- Father: Daniel Hudson

Tyler Hudson, played by Caleb Jonte Edwards, made his first appearance in 2026. "Ash James" arrives at the hospital alongside Cindy Te Toka and Cody Munore on their first day at work surprising Maeve as they were all juniors. On his first day, "Ash" was overheard on the phone insisting that "it's not going to work" and that "they're not going to buy it." Later that same night He and Cindy sleep together. In the aftermath of the FernBurn rave, Ash was caught up in the fallout when numerous attendees were admitted to ED with burns caused by fireworks. The situation worsened when Ryan Martin the drug dealer who had supplied substances at the rave, appeared at the hospital and continued dealing, when he confronts Cindy he back off, Ash stepped in and violently snapped Ryan's arm, shocking Cindy. Later that same day "Ash" begins sleeping with Marianne Achari despite her been in a relationship with Emmett it soon ends after she ends it first relieved he didn't have to end it. Later, "Ash" and Cindy rekindle their relationship in the hospital car park inside "Ash"'s car. Later Cindy makes a shocking discovery about "Ash" she learns that the real Ash James is in Australia meaning that the main she living with is an imposter, she and Cody search through his room. They find hidden inside his drawers are wads of cash and a passport bearing the name Tyler Hudson!!!. He later sleeps with Poppy Achari after spending the day drinking with flatmates. At the end of June "Ash" and Poppy go out on a proper date. In July Paul orders "Ash" to e-register as Tyler and use Ash as his nickname in order to save his job. Poppy breaks up with him and Maeve to lose her job as HOD of Nursing.After a bizarre dream sequence where Maeve and Sage appear wearing fishnets and top hats while singing about Poppy sleeping with Tyler, Emmett also joins in with his own musical number. Poppy wakes to find Tyler in front of her, leaving her confused by the dream and her feelings.

She later discusses everything with BJ, before eventually opening up to Tyler about her past relationship with Hendrix and the dream she had. The pair share a kiss.

== Cindy Te Toka ==
Cindy Te Toka
- Shortland Street character
- Portrayed by: Tia Reweti
- Duration: 2026–present
- First appearance: 16 February 2026
- Introduced by: Oliver Driver
In-universe information
- Occupation: Nurse

Cindy Te Toka, played by Tia Reweti, made her first appearance in 2026. Cindy arrives at the hospital alongside "Ash James" and Cody Munroe on their first day at work surprising Maeve as they were all juniors she quickly stood out for her sharp comedic sense of humour, joking that Chris Warner had the biggest blue eyes, and later pleading with Rachel not to fire her after making a quip in the lifts. Later that same night she and "Ash James" sleep together. On her second day of work she quickly prove she was out of her depth where she was accidentally electrocuted by a defibrillator despite a patient still having a cardiac pause. The following week she was tasked with minding a patient with paranoia issues, she loses track of him, climbed into the air ducts thinking he had gone into there, resulting in her falling through the ceiling of the emergency department. she later discovers that the real Ash James is in Australia meaning that the main is living with his an imposter She and Cody search his room, where they uncover wads of cash and a passport in the name of Tyler Hudson. In June here was a bomb from a local gym that had gone off Sophia Crane prepared the ED tells the staff to label patients with white as dead on arrival; red for critical; orange for moderate injuries; green for the walking wounded, however when a recurring patient passed away while waiting to be seen she is horrified she might be struck off or worse. When CEO Rachel McKenna wanted whoever was responsible to face the consequences Sophia covers for her stating it was her fault, and resigns from Shortland Street.

== Izzy Ropata ==
Izzy Ropata
- Shortland Street character
- Portrayed by: Alex King
- Duration: 2026–present
- First appearance: 24 February 2026
- Introduced by: Oliver Driver
In-universe information
- Occupation: Registrar
- Father: Alexander Dove
- Mother: Miriama Ropata
- Uncles: Hone Ropata

Izzy Ropata (also Dove), played by Alex King, made her first appearance in 2026. Izzy arrived as a patient from a FernBurn rave party, following a fentanyl overdose and an arm injury. A week later she officially begins work at the hospital as a new registrar quickly clashed with Phil Grayson she invites her to Mollys but witnessing her Villi and her kissing. In March it was revealed after a major surgery she is the daughter of strict surgeon Miriama Ropata which stunned Phil. she later has a one-night stand with Cody Munroe. She is shocked to see her ex Scott Collins touring the hospital she tells Sage they were once involved he soon tells Phil about it and reveals she was once pregnant with his baby and her father forced her to get an abortion On the day of their surgical exam, Izzy panics and locks herself in her bedroom, convinced she cannot go through with it she trys her best to encourage her to come to work and sit the exam Despite Phil's efforts, Izzy refuses to leave the room, causing them both to miss the exam the next day she tells everyone its was Phil who panicked instead of her. In May Izzy begin a casual relationship with Vili it soon ends after he took the side of Arlo Wright during surgery she later discovers he step aside to hook up with a woman she blackmails him with this information however they make a deal and she drops the matter. her father Alexander later arrives and buys Phils house as a gift. In July Izzy reports Phil to HR for bullying after Steve's mother Sharon confront her his death.

== Miriama Ropata ==
Miriama Ropata
- Shortland Street character
- Portrayed by: Maria Walker
- Duration: 2026–present
- First appearance: 6 March 2026
- Introduced by: Oliver Driver
In-universe information
- Occupation: Surgeon
- Father: George Ropata
- Mother: Kitty Ropata
- Brothers: Hone Ropata
- Sisters: Aorewa Atutahi
- Husband: Alexander Dove (??–2026); Chris Warner (2026–)
- Daughters: Izzy Dove
- Nephews: Manny Atutahi

Miriama Ropata, played by Maria Walker, made her first appearance in 2026. Miriama arrives at Shortland Street to meet Chris Warner at the cafe remarks that she cannot believe she took her ex-husband's surname, especially as he will be keeping it following their divorce. Chris quips that her brother will be pleased, adding that it would be good to have a Ropata back at the hospital. She invites Phil Grayson to assist and observe during a major surgery she begins to complaining to her about Izzy's behaviour she quickly shuts down the conversation it was revealed that she is Izzy's mother. she later meets Chris and Rachel for lunch at Lola's, explaining that her partner Lyle is too busy with work to join them. Before lunch can begin, Rachel is called away, leaving Chris and Miriama alone together. Their conversation stretches late into the evening, with Chris admitting he no longer knows where he stands with Rachel. The two almost share a moment before Miriama gently tells Chris they should leave separately

== Paul Cremorne ==
Paul Cremorne
- Shortland Street character
- Portrayed by: Christopher Alan Moore
- Duration: 2026–present
- First appearance: 25 May 2026
- Introduced by: Oliver Driver
In-universe information
- Occupation: CEO

Paul Cremorne, played by Christopher Alan Moore, made his first appearance in May 2026. Paul is first seen interrupting Monique just as she's about to confess her feelings to Marty Walker casually asking for directions. He later bumps into Phil Grayson and asks for the cafeteria; she directs him and nicknames him Tin Tin. Chris Warner finds him in Rachel's office where Rachel introduces him as the new Head of Marketing who has been observing the hospital, seemingly scouting for PR opportunities. In June he signs a sponsorship deal with FitBurger, arranging for the company's branding to appear on staff scrubs from the following week he begins filming in ED, much to Chris' annoyance However, when a bomb threat strikes the hospital, Paul is forced to put down the camera and assist with the emergency response. Following the ordeal, he suffers a panic attack as the reality of the situation catches up with him. He attempts to ask Phil out on a date but she rejected him. After Rachel McKenna leaves Ferndale he becomes CEO of the hospital he soon hires of new head of Ed Murray Schu he suffered a severe panic attack and leaves. At Phil's celebration party they sleep together. He also demotes Maeve as Director of Nursing for failing to tell him that Ash was using a false identity he then hires Viliami To'a as Director of Nursing saying he wants a man in charge, which creates mistrust from Cindy.

== Alexander Dove ==
Alexander Dove
- Shortland Street character
- Portrayed by: Adam Gardiner
- Duration: 2026–present
- First appearance: 13 July 2026
- Introduced by: Oliver Driver
In-universe information
- Wife: Miriama Ropata
- Daughters: Izzy Dove

Alexander Dove, played by Adam Gardiner, made his first appearance in 2026. Alexander is the father of Izzy and ex-husband of Miriama Ropata. Alexander arrived in Fernale to inspect the house he had purchased for his daughter, Izzy. He was disappointed to learn that she had not been promoted to consultant, revealing that he had hoped the house would be a gift to celebrate her achievement rather than a consolation prize.

== Murray Schu ==
Murray Schu
- Shortland Street character
- Portrayed by: Tom Clarke
- Duration: 2026
- First appearance: 29 June 2026
- Last appearance: 13 July 2026
- Introduced by: Oliver Driver
In-universe information
- Occupation: Consultant

Murray Schu, played by Tom Clarke, made his first appearance in June 2026. Murray arrived at the hospital in late June after CEO Paul Cremorne hired him as Head of ED to replace Sophia Crane.He better known as "Mr Pie Guy" On his first day he brings doughnuts in for the ED staff, which doesn't impress Poppy During an emergency intubation on a critically ill patient, Murray's nerves get the better of him and he accidentally cracks the patient's teeth while attempting the procedure. Horrified by his mistake, Poppy orders him out of the room. In July he begins to hyperventilate when treating a patient with a stab wound. He confides in Poppy that two years earlier, there had been a hospital shooting at his previous workplace, during which two of his nurses, who were also his friends and colleagues were killed. Following car park explosion at the hospital multiple injured staff members flooded the emergency department, triggering Murray's unresolved trauma from the hospital shooting he had previously experienced. Overwhelmed, he suffered a severe panic attack, shouting about bombs as Poppy desperately tried to calm him down. In his panic, he accidentally struck Poppy, prompting her to ask Maeve to bring a sedative, which she administered. Security guards then escorted Murray out of the hospital. Afterwards, Poppy apologised for encouraging him to stay at the hospital when he clearly wasn't coping, but Murray thanked her for believing in him and supporting him before leaving the hospital.

== BJ Nicholson ==
BJ Nicholson
- Shortland Street character
- Portrayed by: Ella Gilbert
- Duration: 2026–present
- First appearance: 14 July 2026
- Introduced by: Oliver Driver
In-universe information
- Occupation: Paramedic

BJ Nicholson, played by Ella Gilbert, made her first appearance in 2026. BJ arrived at the hospital as a paramedic transporting a patient. She introduced herself to Poppy, explaining she was new to Ferndale, before turning around to reveal that she had been impaled in the back. Despite her injury, BJ joked about Poppy checking out her hole. Noticing the tension between Poppy and Tyler, she cheekily asked how long they had been sleeping together and nicknamed Tyler Edward Cullen. She also teased Poppy that if things didn't work out between them, she could always give her a call.

Before leaving, BJ accidentally bumped into Maeve, quickly apologised, complimented her appearance, and jokingly compared her to Kristen Stewart creating chemistry between them.

The following day, BJ returns and asks Poppy for updates about her life, including whether Maeve is currently seeing anyone.

== Daniel Hudson ==
Daniel Hudson
- Shortland Street character
- Portrayed by: Aaron Jeffery
- Duration: 2026
- First appearance: 9 September 2026
- Last appearance: 17 November 2026
- Introduced by: Oliver Driver
In-universe information
- Sons: Tyler Hudson
- Daughters: Michelle "Mickey" Hudson

Daniel Hudson, played by Aaron Jeffery, made his first appearance in 2026. Daniel is the father of established character Tyler Hudson
