= Undone (Slaughter novel) =

2009 novel by Karin Slaughter

- US book cover
- Author: Karin Slaughter
- Audio read by: Kathleen Early
- Language: English
- Series: Will Trent
- Release number: 3
- Genre: Crime fiction
- Set in: Atlanta, Georgia
- Publisher: Delacorte Press
- Publication date: July 14, 2009
- Publication place: United States
- Media type: Print; Digital
- Pages: 448 (Hardcover edition)
- ISBN: 978-0385341967
- Preceded by: Fractured
- Followed by: Broken
- Website: karinslaughter.com/undone

Undone is a 2009 novel by bestselling author Karin Slaughter that combines characters from her Atlanta series and her Grant County series. It is her ninth full-length novel. Undone was published under the name Genesis in the UK, Australia, and other non-US markets. The audiobook is narrated by Kathleen Early.

== Synopsis ==
Faith Mitchell is walking across the parking deck at a courthouse when she passes out. She wakes up in the emergency room of Atlanta's Grady Memorial Hospital, where she was taken by her partner, Will Trent, who was with her when it happened. It turns out that Faith has two serious medical conditions, one she knew about and one she didn't; both could end her nascent career as a special agent with the GBI almost before it has started.

At the hospital, Faith and Will meet Dr. Sara Linton. Sara has moved to Atlanta to recover from the explosive ending of Beyond Reach and now works in Grady's ER.

Right after seeing Faith, Sara rushes to the aid of a woman who was hit by a car after wandering naked onto a highway in the middle of nowhere, and is peeved to find Will trying to question the victim. Sara quickly becomes aware of the same thing that caused Will to involve himself—the woman has suffered abominably cruel torture at the hands of a sadistic man.

Will and Faith take over the case and find themselves hobbled from the start by the local yokel law enforcement, which seems more interested in grudge-bearing than in catching a deranged killer. Sara eventually becomes involved by dint of her previous experience as one of the state's top-notch coroners.
