= Triptych (Slaughter novel) =

2006 novel by Karin Slaughter

- First hardcover edition (US)
- Author: Karin Slaughter
- Audio read by: Michael Kramer
- Language: English
- Series: Will Trent
- Release number: 1
- Genre: Crime fiction
- Set in: Atlanta, Georgia
- Publisher: Delacorte Press
- Publication date: August 15, 2006
- Publication place: United States
- Media type: Print; Digital
- Pages: 400 (Hardcover edition)
- ISBN: 978-0385339469
- Followed by: Fractured
- Website: karinslaughter.com/triptych

Triptych is a 2006 thriller novel by the American author Karin Slaughter. The first in her Atlanta series, the novel centers on Georgia Bureau of Investigation detective Will Trent, who follows a serial rapist while overcoming a learning disability.

Triptych was positively reviewed by USA Today, Kirkus Reviews, and the San Francisco Chronicle. Slaughter wrote subsequent novels featuring Trent, starting with Fractured in 2008. The story has been adapted for television in Will Trent, which debuted in 2023 on ABC in the U.S.

== Plot summary ==
Will Trent, a detective with the Georgia Bureau of Investigation, is on the trail of a serial rapist with a gruesome inclination, when he comes into contact with Michael Ormewood, an Atlanta homicide detective. Ormewood has a dark past and it involves Angie Polaski, a vice cop who is the only woman Will has ever loved. John Shelley, who at fifteen was tried as an adult for the rape and murder of a neighbor girl, has just gotten out of prison after twenty years. John's trying to stay clean and keep his parole officer happy when he discovers by accident that he's involved with the rapist, and if John doesn't take action fast, he will end up back in prison. Will and Michael work to solve the case, mingling with the pimps and sex workers of Atlanta's housing projects in search of clues. Will and Angie resume their strange relationship after a two-year hiatus. Will continues his struggle to keep anyone from finding out about his dyslexia, a definite career-ender, and Will's job is the only thing that keeps the painful demons of his own past at bay.

== Critical reception ==
Carol Memmott of USA Today praised Triptych: "Slaughter's gift for building multi-layered tension while deconstructing damaged personalities gives this thriller a nerve-wracking finish." Kirkus Reviews found that the plot development "[keeps] even the wariest readers off-balance and [leaves] the last act for a settling of accounts" and concluded about the character development: "The volcanic heroes and villains, who act both surprisingly and logically, are a welcome sign that Slaughter's trademark franchise only hints at the range of her gifts." Tara Gelsomino of Romantic Times rated the book four stars out of five and commented that among the three main characters' storylines, "...John's possibly wrongful imprisonment is the most horrifying of all, rife with it-could-happen-to-you implications."

For the San Francisco Chronicle, David Lazarus said the plot "unfolds slowly" but was "worth the effort" and praised what he called "the strong characters", including Trent: "Severely dyslexic and scarred by a tragic past, his struggle to do right proves both fascinating and appalling." David J. Montgomery of The Philadelphia Inquirer called Triptych Slaughter's best work, "a novel of power and substance that is shocking and painful at times, but also gripping and resonant."

In a 2011 review, Joe Hartlaub of Book Reporter praised Triptych as "a character study... on three individuals with the shifts in perspective slowly revealing all".

Publishers Weekly had a more critical review: "...the shock value garnered by the plot twist isn't matched by the predictable denouement."

== Sequels and adaptations ==
In 2008, Delacorte published Fractured, the sequel to Triptych, again featuring Will Trent. By 2020, Slaughter had written ten novels in the Will Trent series.

In 2022, ABC ordered Will Trent, a television pilot based on the novels. Starring Ramón Rodríguez as the titular character, Will Trent premiered on January 3, 2023, with 6.6 million viewers, the highest viewership in the 10 p.m. time slot since 2021. Will Trent would become the highest-rated debut show for ABC in the 2022–23 television season, resulting in the network renewing the show for a second season in April 2023.
