= Relic (2020 film) =

2020 film by Natalie Erika James

- Theatrical release poster
- Directed by: Natalie Erika James
- Written by: Natalie Erika James; Christian White
- Produced by: Jake Gyllenhaal; Riva Marker; Anna McLeish; Sarah Shaw
- Starring: Emily Mortimer; Robyn Nevin; Bella Heathcote
- Cinematography: Charlie Sarroff
- Edited by: Denise Haratzis; Sean Lahiff
- Music by: Brian Reitzell
- Production companies: Screen Australia; Film Victoria; Nine Stories Productions; Gozie AGBO; Carver Films
- Distributed by: Stan (Australia); IFC Midnight (United States)
- Release dates: 25 January 2020 (Sundance); 3 July 2020 (United States); 7 October 2020 (Australia)
- Running time: 89 minutes
- Countries: Australia; United States
- Language: English
- Box office: $3.2 million

Relic is a 2020 psychological horror film directed by Natalie Erika James from a screenplay by James and Christian White. The film stars Emily Mortimer, Robyn Nevin, and Bella Heathcote.

Relic had its world premiere at the Sundance Film Festival on 25 January 2020, and was released on 3 July in the United States by IFC Midnight, and 10 July in Australia on Stan.

== Plot ==
When Edna, an elderly widow who is suffering from dementia, goes missing, her daughter Kay and granddaughter Sam travel to their remote family home to look for her. They discover the house locked from the inside, and a strange black mould-like substance on an upstairs wall. Much of the furniture is adorned with reminders for Edna written on post-it notes.

That night, Edna's neighbour Jamie visits them. Jamie says he had not visited Edna for a while because his father would not let him. Sam and Kay grow increasingly disturbed by a loud creaking from inside the walls and the appearance of more black mould throughout the house. Kay experiences nightmares of a withered rotting corpse in an old shack in the woodlands.

The next morning, Kay finds Edna has returned, barefoot and muddied, and unaware of her own disappearance. Following a visit from a doctor, Edna is found to be mostly of sound mind and without injury with the exception of a large black bruise on her chest (resembling the mould). Kay tells Sam she plans to move Edna into a retirement home. That night, Kay finds Edna sleepwalking toward the front door, whispering, "It's nothing." After being brought back to bed, Edna is convinced there is something hiding in the room and urges Kay to check under the bed; Kay sees something breathing but is distracted before she can investigate further.

The next day, Sam and her grandmother share a tender moment until Edna suddenly grows cold and accuses Sam of stealing from her. She snatches a ring off Sam's finger, not remembering she gifted it to Sam. Following another violent event involving Edna, Sam visits Jamie's father Alex to ask why he stopped letting Jamie visit. Alex reveals that the last time Jamie visited, the pair played hide-and-seek. Edna locked Jamie in his hiding space and left him there for hours, forgetting she had even seen him that day. Back at the house, Kay follows Edna into the garden, where she finds her tearing pages from the family photo album and frantically eating them. When Kay tries to intervene, Edna bites her and storms off, attempting to bury the album in the soil, claiming it will "be safer there". Fearing that something may come to get her, Edna softens and agrees to let Kay take care of her.

Sam investigates Jamie's hiding place and discovers a hidden hallway to another part of the house. She enters but becomes lost and disorientated as the mould covered corridors begin to loop in on themselves. Disorientated and afraid, she resorts to screaming and banging on the walls. Edna's condition seems to have worsened again; she now glares at Kay mistrustfully, refusing to eat and wetting herself. Kay notices that her mother's urine is stained with mould. As Edna bathes, she scratches what was once her bruise but is now rotting black flesh. The bathwater overflows and shorts out an electric heater, causing the house's power to go out, as Edna runs off. Sam travels deeper into the corridors. The ceilings slope lower, forcing her to crawl. She eventually escapes by knocking holes through the mould-covered walls.

Kay follows Edna into the mould covered 'space' of the house and finds her, much to her horror, picking at her rotting face with a knife. Kay and Sam flee further into the passageway when they hear Edna approach. Edna, now disfigured and physically contorted, crawls towards them. Sam and Kay break through the wall and fall into the lounge room, followed by Edna. She attempts to pin down Sam before being beaten down by Kay. Kay shares a moment before she leaves the decaying Edna, looking at a post-it note on the floor, labelled "I AM LOVED". As they escape the house, Kay realises she cannot leave her mum and returns to Edna to carry her to bed, locking Sam outside. She finishes peeling away the last remnants of Edna's hair and rotten flesh to reveal a withered mummy-like body, like the one in her nightmare. Kay and Sam then lie on the bed with Edna until she peacefully falls asleep. As they rest Sam notices a small black bruise obscured by her collar as she reaches for it.

== Cast ==
- Emily Mortimer as Kay
- Robyn Nevin as Edna
- Bella Heathcote as Sam
- Chris Bunton as Jamie
- Jeremy Stanford as Alex
- Steve Rodgers as Constable Mike Adler

== Production ==
In October 2018, Emily Mortimer, Robyn Nevin, and Bella Heathcote joined the cast of the film with Natalie Erika James directing from a screenplay she co-wrote alongside Christian White. Jake Gyllenhaal and Riva Marker served as producers on the film, while Anthony Russo and Joe Russo served as executive producers under their Nine Stories Productions and AGBO banners, respectively.

Principal photography began on 8 October and wrapped on 16 November, resulting in a 30-day shoot. Post-production began on 26 November.

== Release ==
Relic had its world premiere at the Sundance Film Festival on 25 January 2020. The film was originally scheduled to screen at SXSW in March as part of the Midnighters section, but the festival was cancelled due to the COVID-19 pandemic. On 10 March, it was announced that IFC Midnight had acquired the North American distribution rights to the film. In the United States, it was released on 3 July in drive-in theatres and received a wide release in theatres and video on demand on 10 July.

== Reception ==
=== Box office ===
Relic grossed $192,352 from 69 theaters in its opening weekend, finishing first among reported films. It then made $195,674 from 128 theaters in its second weekend.

=== Critical response ===
On review aggregator website Rotten Tomatoes, the film holds an approval rating of 92% based on 231 reviews, with an average score of 7.6/10. The site's critics consensus reads, "Relic ratchets up its slowly building tension in an expertly crafted atmosphere of dread, adding up to an outstanding feature debut for director/co-writer Natalie Erika James." On Metacritic, the film has a weighted average score of 77 out of 100, based on 37 critics, indicating "generally favorable reviews".

Justin Chang, speaking on Fresh Air, said: "There are no shocking twists or contrivances in store in Relic, and not a lot of gore, either. James excels at mining dread and tension from ordinary conversation, and she uses thriller conventions to get at something simple but shattering: the horror of watching a parent slowly deteriorate."

=== Accolades ===
| Award | Date of ceremony | Category | Recipient(s) | Result | Ref. |
|---|---|---|---|---|---|
| Australian Writers' Guild | 22 August 2019 | Feature Film – Original | Christian White and Natalie Erika James | Nominated | |
| AACTA Awards | 30 November 2020 | Best Film | Anna McLeish and Sarah Shaw | Nominated | |
| AACTA Awards | 30 November 2020 | Best Direction | Natalie Erika James | Nominated | |
| AACTA Awards | 30 November 2020 | Best Screenplay | Christian White and Natalie Erika James | Nominated | |
| AACTA Awards | 30 November 2020 | Best Supporting Actress | Bella Heathcote | Nominated | |
| AACTA Awards | 30 November 2020 | Best Sound | Robert Mackenzie, John Wilkinson, Steve Burgess, and Glenn Newnham | Nominated | |
| AACTA Awards | 30 November 2020 | Best Hair and Makeup | Angela Conte, Larry Van Duynhoven, and Bec Taylor | Nominated | |
| IndieWire Critics Poll | 14 December 2020 | Best First Feature | Relic | 5th place | |
| Florida Film Critics Circle | 21 December 2020 | Best First Film | Relic | Nominated | |
| Critics' Choice Super Awards | 10 January 2021 | Best Horror Movie | Relic | Nominated | |
| Gotham Awards | 11 January 2021 | Best Feature | Relic | Nominated | |
| Gotham Awards | 11 January 2021 | Audience Award | Relic | Nominated | |
