= Scarborough (2018 film) =

2018 drama film

- Film poster
- Directed by: Barnaby Southcombe
- Written by: Barnaby Southcombe
- Based on: Scarborough by Fiona Evans
- Produced by: Christopher Granier-Deferre
- Starring: Jessica Barden; Jordan Bolger; Edward Hogg; Jodhi May
- Cinematography: Ian Liggett
- Edited by: Agnieska Liggett
- Music by: Daniel Pemberton
- Production companies: Embargo Films; Poisson Rouge Pictures
- Distributed by: Kaleidoscope Entertainment
- Release dates: 13 October 2018 (WFF); 6 September 2019 (United Kingdom)
- Running time: 84 minutes
- Country: United Kingdom
- Language: English

Scarborough is a 2018 British drama film written and directed by Barnaby Southcombe. Set in the town of Scarborough, the story follows two couples who both have a teacher/pupil relationship and are conducting their affairs against a backdrop of the questionable nature of their relationships. It stars Jessica Barden, Jordan Bolger, Edward Hogg, and Jodhi May as the two couples. It premiered at the Warsaw Film Festival on 13 October 2018, and was theatrically released in the United Kingdom on 6 September 2019, by Kaleidoscope Entertainment.

== Plot ==
Two couples check into a run-down hotel on the sea-front in Scarborough. Two of the people involved are "barely sixteen" and the other two are their teachers. The dynamics of the teacher/pupil relationship is put to the test over two weekends in Scarborough. Whilst it seems that the couples are aware of each other's presence, they do not interact with each other.

== Cast ==
- Jessica Barden as Beth
- Jordan Bolger as Daz
- Edward Hogg as Aiden
- Jodhi May as Liz
- Daniel York as Hotel Manager

== Production ==
The film was adapted for screen by its director, Barnaby Southcombe, who saw the original play Scarborough, written by Fiona Evans, at the Royal Court Theatre in London in 2008. The play was first acted in Edinburgh, but the original script sets the characters in a bed and breakfast in Scarborough, as opposed to a hotel. Principal photography took place in the seaside town of Scarborough in North Yorkshire from May 2017. The hotel used in the production is The Grand Hotel which overlooks the South Bay in Scarborough, though for the film it is renamed as The Metropole.

== Release ==
The film was screened at the Warsaw Film Festival in October 2018 and at the Macao International Festival of Film in December 2018. The production will receive its UK premiere in the Stephen Joseph Theatre in the town of Scarborough on 6 September 2019, and will also receive a limited showing in some towns across Yorkshire before its full UK release in September 2019.

The film is one of 15 international films showcased at the Hof International Film Festival 2019, and will receive its Canadian premiere in September 2019 at the Vancouver International Film Festival.

== Reception ==
The film was previewed at the Warsaw Film Festival in October 2018, where one reviewer stated "Barnaby Southcombe’s seaside love story soars and never loses its footloose fun reflected in Ian Leggett’s [sic] energetic hand-held camera and limpid widescreen seascapes." The film was also nominated for best film at the Transilvania International Film Festival, where one writer stated that "The hand-held camera increases the feeling that we are intruding on the characters’ most intimate moments, but this is a sensation that the film’s parallel editing prevents from sinking in too deep. Southcombe’s decision to alternate between the scenes showing the two couples hints at the fact that the stories unfold simultaneously."

Gráinne Humphreys, the director of the Dublin International Film Festival said

Southcombe's elegant drama evades easy definitions. There is a moral complexity to the characters which will both unsettle and intrigue audiences.

== Accolades ==
Award	Date of ceremony	Category	Recipient(s) and nominee(s)	Result	Ref(s)
International Film Festival, Macao	14 December 2018	Best Screenplay	Scarborough	Won	
Transilvania International Film Festival	11 June 2019	Best Film	Scarborough	Nominated	
