= The Unremarkable Heart =

Short story by Karin Slaughter

The Unremarkable Heart and Other Stories
- First edition
- Author: Karin Slaughter
- Genre: Fiction, Thriller, Short stories
- Published: 2011
- Publisher: Mulholland Books
- Awards: Edgar Award for Best Short Story (2013)
- ISBN: 978-1-609-98768-8
- Website: The Unremarkable Heart

The Unremarkable Heart and Other Stories (ISBN 978-1-609-98768-8) is a short story (book) written by Karin Slaughter and published by Mulholland Books (an imprint of Little, Brown and Company owned by Hachette Book Group) on 26 May 2011 which later won the Edgar Award for Best Short Story in 2013.
