= Becoming Victoria Wood =

2026 British documentary film

- Directed by: Catherine Abbott
- Produced by: Heather McCorriston
- Edited by: Jane Tubb
- Music by: Francis Macdonald
- Production companies: Rogan Scotland; Phil McIntyre TV for U&Gold
- Distributed by: Dartmouth Films
- Release date: January 9, 2026
- Running time: 90 minutes
- Country: United Kingdom
- Language: English
- Box office: $147,395

Becoming Victoria Wood is a 2026 British documentary film directed by Catherine Abbott. Its subject is the life and work of the British comedian, writer, musician and actress Victoria Wood (1953–2016). It saw a limited theatrical run, garnering $147,395 at the British box office.

== Scenario ==
The film covers Wood's formative years and the development of her career, via interviews with Wood and her friends and colleagues, and archive material. Some of Wood's writings are read to camera by Jessica Barden.

== Cast ==
- Victoria Wood (archive footage)
- Jessica Barden as Victoria Wood

Interviewees include:

- Joan Armatrading
- Michael Ball
- Jasper Carrott
- John Dowie
- Dawn French
- Maxine Peake
- Geoff Posner
- Jennifer Saunders

== Release ==
The film was released theatrically in the UK on 9 January 2026, and premiered on the UK pay TV channel U&Gold on 12 February 2026.

== Reception ==
Cath Clarke in The Guardian gave the film 3/5 stars, writing: "This documentary is tender, moving and an absolute hoot. ... For those who grew up with Wood as a national treasure, Becoming Victoria Wood will be a revelation."

Wendy Ide wrote in The Observer: "Featuring contributions from friends and colleagues ... this illuminating film features a wealth of archive material to persuasively support its argument that Wood was one of the greatest comedians in British entertainment history. Will it tell you much you don’t already know? Perhaps not. But there is some previously unseen footage included and the tributes are thoughtful and insightful. The main draw, however, remains Wood’s glorious wit and versatility. It’s a delight of a film, like spending time with a much-missed old friend."

In The Times, Kevin Maher gave the film 2/5 stars, writing: "The promotional material for this long-overdue documentary about the trailblazing comedic genius Victoria Wood promises that the film will 'delve into the complex inner world of this national treasure nearly ten years after her passing'. If only. Unlike, say, Asif Kapadia’s Amy or Kevin Macdonald’s Whitney, there is no delving here. There’s barely even minor dabbling. Instead, and mostly aping the faux sincerity of branded Netflix efforts such as Beckham and Robbie Williams, this one-note profile leans heavily into anodyne archive interviews (lots of Parkinson) and platitudinous guff from celebrity buddies... What? No mention of her divorce, her eating disorder, her adherence to Quakerism and to psychotherapy and the truth about her complex relationship with a difficult mother who, Wood once claimed, 'might admit through gritted teeth that we are related'? She deserved better."

Also in The Times, Carol Midgley called the film a "skilfully woven documentary".

Nikki Baughan wrote for ScreenDaily: "Catherine Abbott’s heartfelt, tender documentary largely focuses on Wood’s childhood and early career, up to her seminal 1984 series As Seen On TV, and – while it is clearly made by fans, for fans – it proves a timely reminder of Wood’s phenomenal talent, and a tribute to the doors she opened and the influence she continues to have... Becoming Victoria Wood will hold few surprises for Wood’s legions of fans, particularly those who have read Jasper Rees’s excellent 2020 biography Let’s Do It. ... But its access to previously unseen personal materials and its careful use of archive footage make it a hugely enjoyable watch."
