= We Will Annihilate Our Enemies =

Studio album by Real Lies
- Released: 16 April 2025
- Label: Tonal
- Producer: Real Lies

Real Lies chronology
Lad Ash (2022)	We Will Annihilate Our Enemies (2025)

We Will Annihilate Our Enemies is the third studio album by London band Real Lies, released on 16 April 2025 through Tonal Records.

The album features guest vocals from actress Jessica Barden on the track “Finding Money”.

== Reception ==
Professional ratings
Review scores
Source	Rating
The Guardian	4/5 stars
Sputnikmusic	4.5/5 stars

The album was released to a favourable reception. Shaad D'Souza of The Guardian praised the "heady, euphoric combination" of the album and gave it 4/5 stars. The Quietus stated that it might be their "most accomplished album to date", which draws "from an even broader palette of influences to create their most mature, refined work yet", and included it in their Music of the Month. They also listed it as number 19 in their Albums of the Year So Far list, and in the Best 100 Albums of 2025. NPR included it in their All Songs Considered albums of the week review, calling it "dramatic, intense and deeply sad" and praising the "intimacy that not all electronic music possesses". Grant Sharples, writing for Interview magazine, said the album "revels in intensity. Seldom does it let up on the gas pedal". The Fader included it as a standout album of the week, saying it "confront[s] the changing face of a digital world and embrace[s] it." Clash called it "sharp, immediate, and emotionally muscular....an album forged in the fire of digital disconnection, relentless information overload, and a near-pathological craving for connection." Nialler9 included in it their best albums of April, it made the God Is in the TV albums of the year list, and was included in Uproxx's 'Most Overlooked Indie Albums of 2025'.
