= Real Life (Real Lies album) =

Studio album by Real Lies
- Released: 16 October 2015
- Genre: Synthpop, alternative dance
- Length: 43:44
- Label: Marathon Artists
- Producer: Real Lies

Real Lies chronology
Real Life (2015)	Lad Ash (2022)

Singles from Real Life
- 1. "World Peace / Deeper" Released: 11 November 2013; 2. "North Circular / Dab Housing" Released: 21 August 2014; 3. "Seven Sisters" Released: 6 May 2015

Real Life is the debut album by British band Real Lies, released on 16 October 2015 through independent label Marathon Artists.

== Composition and production ==
The band developed the tracks on the album while living in Manor House, north London.

== Reception ==
Professional ratings
Aggregate scores
Source	Rating
Metacritic	67
Review scores
Source	Rating
Clash	9/10 stars
The Guardian	3/5 stars
NME	4/5 stars
musicOMH	3.5/5 stars
DIY	2/5 stars

The album has received favourable reviews from publications including the Guardian and NME.

== Track listing ==
All tracks are written by Kev Kharas, Pat King and Tom Watson

No.	Title	Length
1.	"Blackmarket Blues"	4:37
2.	"Dab Housing"	4:14
3.	"World Peace"	4:01
4.	"Deeper"	4:13
5.	"One Club Town"	3:39
6.	"North Circular"	5:13
7.	"Lovers' Lane"	3:12
8.	"Seven Sisters"	3:07
9.	"Naked Ambition"	3:03
10.	"Gospel"	3:34
11.	"Sidetripping"	4:44
