= Simon Armstrong =

Welsh actor

- Born: Llanelli, Wales
- Occupation: Actor
- Known for: Game of Thrones, The Interceptor

Simon Armstrong is a Welsh actor from Llanelli, best known for his portrayal of Qhorin Halfhand in Game of Thrones.

== Career ==
Armstrong portrayed Qhorin Halfhand in the HBO series Game of Thrones (2012). He also had recurring roles in the TV series Coronation Street (2013) and The Interceptor (2015).

He portrayed Rogers in Nigel Cole's Made in Dagenham (2010). He starred in the Dutch crime action comedy Black Out (2012) and in the British drama film In the Dark Half (2012).

In 2014, Simon joined the cast of British-American short Artificio Conceal. The film, written and directed by Ayoub Qanir, was selected to film festivals worldwide including Cannes Film Festival's Short Film Corner , Edinburgh International Film Festival and Seattle International Film Festival.

== Selected filmography ==
=== Film ===
Year	Title	Role	Notes
2005	Pierrepoint	Minister	
2008	The Edge of Love	Wilfred Hosgood	
2010	Made in Dagenham	Rogers	
2011	Killer Elite	Gowling	
2011	Resistance	George's Father	
2012	Black Out	Vlad	
2012	In the Dark Half	Steve	
2014	The Suspicions of Mr Whicher: Beyond the Pale	Boatswain	TV film
2014	Viking: The Berserkers	Aelle	
2014	Artificio Conceal	Interpol Officer Mahler	Short film
2016	Long Forgotten Fields	Harlequin Jones	
2018	Rémi sans famille	Mr. Driscoll	

=== Television ===
Year	Title	Role	Notes
1998–2000	Casualty	PC Carter / PC Gaston	8 episodes
2005	Midsomer Murders	Viv Marshall	1 episode ("Hidden Depths")
2009	Holby City	Andy Rutherford	1 episode ("Spin")
2009	Crash	James Llewelyn	1 episode ("Episode 6")
2012	Game of Thrones	Qhorin Halfhand	4 episodes
2013	M.I. High	The Dark Wizard	1 episode ("The Dark Wizard")
2013	Da Vinci's Demons	Scarpa	3 episodes
2013	Coronation Street	Mr. Peakman	8 episodes
2013	Call the Midwife	Major Fawcett	1 episode ("Christmas Special")
2015	The Interceptor	Stannard	5 episodes
2015	The Coroner	Errol Prowse	1 episode ("Gilt")
2016	Doctors	Cam Lewis	5 episodes

== Selected theatre ==
- 2017: Sir Toby Belch in Twelfth Night at the Royal Exchange, Manchester.
