= Real Lies =

UK musical group

- Origin: London, England
- Genres: Synth-pop; balearic beat; alternative dance
- Years active: 2011-present
- Labels: Marathon Artists; UNREAL
- Members: Kev Kharas; Patrick King
- Past members: Tom Watson
- Website: reallies.co.uk

Real Lies are an English electronic group, formed by Kev Kharas, Tom Watson and Patrick King. They released their debut album Real Life in 2015. They are now a duo after Watson left the band.

The band are from the Holloway area of London and reference the boroughs of Islington and Haringey in their tracks. Their second album, Lad Ash, was released in April 2022, followed by We Will Annihilate Our Enemies in April 2025.

== Early years ==
The band formed after Kharas and Watson, who met "passing cans between each other in the queue for some shit club" moved into a house next to a reservoir in North London. King, who knew Watson from playing football as teenagers, would often DJ at their house parties which lasted for two or three days at a time. The trio began working on songs, often based around samples found by King. An early run of singles included the songs "Deeper" and "World Peace", which were released together on vinyl in 2013. "World Peace", based around a sample of Jean-Luc Ponty's "Computer Incantations For World Peace", was named as Zane Lowe's 'Hottest Record in the World'. This was followed by "North Circular" – which sampled Ron Trent, and Chez Damier – "Dab Housing", "Seven Sisters" and "Blackmarket Blues".

The trio also hosted club nights, the Boy's Own-influenced Congress, Eternal which saw secret DJ sets from Evian Christ, Jacques Greene, Jamie xx and Terry Farley and Luxury which took place in a working timber yard.

== Real Life ==
Their debut album Real Life was released in 2015, receiving positive reviews from NME, The Guardian and Clash.

Expanding to a five-piece for live shows, the band embarked on a UK tour with Foals in 2015, played festivals such as Glastonbury Festival, Bestival, MIDI and the Jamie xx-curated Nuits Sonores, and recorded a pair of Maida Vale sessions for BBC Radio 1. In 2016, they released the single "One Club Town", sampling "Fascinating Rhythm" by Bassomatic. A video for the song, directed by Jonathan Entwistle, was premiered by i-D in February 2016.

== UNREAL ==
After Real Life, the band started working on new music but were unhappy with the material, which was eventually scrapped.

In April 2018, "The Checks" was released on their own UNREAL label. Clash Magazine called it "a gritty, rave empowered return." This was followed by "White Flowers" – a collaboration with British producer Tom Demac – was released through Kompakt, and reviewed favourably by Pitchfork. While in November 2018, Real Lies appeared on Icarus' single "Man of the Land".

During this time, they also released a series of mixes on SoundCloud called UNREAL RADIO, featuring a number of unreleased "Late Editions".

In October 2019, it was revealed that Watson had left the band.

== Lad Ash ==
In November 2019, Real Lies released their first single as a duo, "You Were In Love". This was followed in February 2020 by "Boss Trick", an ode to Watson. A video for the song was premiered by Crack Magazine.

In an accompanying interview, Kharas revealed they were working on a collection of new songs called Lad Ash:

"Each song from Lad Ash is a farewell to something, but also about finding solace in what you're left with and excitement in something new. The ‘L' word is loaded, I know. But I wanted to confront it head-on, show the distance between then and now."

Their new material was described in Paste as featuring "the poetic depiction of love and alienation that made their debut so compelling."

In March 2020, Real Lies were forced to postpone their "first proper tour in five years" due to the global coronavirus pandemic. They later streamed a live concert via Facebook, debuting a cover of A Rainy Night in Soho by The Pogues, which was made available for digital download for a limited time to raise money for the Trussell Trust.

On 9 Feb 2022, Real Lies released "An Oral History Of My First Kiss", the next single from Lad Ash, and revealed that the album would be released on 22 April 2022.

Lad Ash received favourable reviews from many publications, and was included in end of year reviews by The Quietus, The New Yorker, God Is In The TV and Nialler9.

== Discography ==
=== Albums ===
- Real Life (2015)
- Lad Ash (2022)
- We Will Annihilate Our Enemies (2025)

=== Singles ===
Year	Title	Format	Released	Tracks	Label
2012	"Deeper"	Digital download	8 November 2012	World Peace; Deeper; Deeper (Bey LF Remix)	Marathon Artists
2013	"World Peace"	Digital download	2 December 2013	World Peace (Pariah Remix)	Marathon Artists
2014	"North Circular"	Vinyl + digital download	5 June 2014	North Circular	Marathon Artists
2014	"Dab Housing"	Vinyl + digital download	21 August 2014	Dab Housing	Marathon Artists
2015	"Seven Sisters"	Digital download	6 May 2015	Seven Sisters	Marathon Artists
2015	"Blackmarket Blues"	Digital download	28 September 2015	Blackmarket Blues	Marathon Artists
2016	"One Club Town"	Digital download	3 February 2016	One Club Town	Marathon Artists
2018	"The Checks"	Digital download	20 April 2018	The Checks	UNREAL
2018	"White Flowers"	Vinyl + digital download	14 September 2018	White Flowers	Kompakt
2019	"You Were in Love"	Digital download	20 November 2019	You Were in Love	UNREAL
2020	"Boss Trick"	Digital download	26 February 2020	Boss Trick	UNREAL
2022	"An Oral History of My First Kiss"	Digital download	9 February 2022	An Oral History of My First Kiss	UNREAL

=== Remixes ===
- Pet Shop Boys - "Say It To Me" (Real Lies Remix), 15 September 2016
- Two Door Cinema Club - "Bad Decisions" (Real Lies Remix), 28 October 2016
