= Indelible =

Book by Karin Slaughter

Indelible is the fourth book in the Grant County series by author Karin Slaughter. It was originally released in hardback in 2004. Previous books in the series are Blindsighted, Kisscut, and A Faint Cold Fear. These books star Sara Linton, Jeffrey Tolliver, and Lena Adams.

== Summary ==
The story goes back and forth in time, from the beginnings of Sara and Jeffrey’s relationship to a hostage situation at the Grant County Police Station. After dating for a few months, Sara and Jeffrey head for the beaches of Florida for a few days. On their way Jeffrey makes a detour to Sylacauga, Alabama, to show her where he grew up and introduce her to his childhood friends, Robert and Possum and their wives. They plan to spend the night in Jeffrey's old bedroom but Sara's first meeting with his mother upsets her so, she dashes out into the street. When Jeffrey finally catches up to her, they hear a scream and gunshots coming from Robert's house. Jeffrey kicks in the door and finds a wounded Robert and his wife with a dead man in their bedroom, and their stories are conflicting and shaky. Sara and Jeffrey assist in the ensuing investigation and when it is finally resolved, Jeffrey finds that some of those closest to him during his past were not who he thought they were, and some of his deepest secrets are revealed to Sara. But that is only half the book—fast forward to the present, where the Heartsdale Police Station is taken over in a murderous bloodbath by heavily armed gunmen, right in the middle of an elementary school field trip, and while Sara is there. A terrifying and tense hostage situation develops. Lena, back on the force now, on her birthday, and suspecting she has become pregnant by abusive boyfriend Ethan Green, is one of the few Grant County cops on the outside, not knowing who's dead and who's alive. What do the gunmen want? Who are they? Is this somehow related to the events in Sylacauga all those years ago?

== Book covers ==
US Indelible rerelease cover

UK Indelible cover

Original US hardback cover

Original US paperback cover

== Sources ==
- BookReporter review of Indelible
- Library Things page about Indelible
- Amazon Indelible reviews
- Romantic Times article
