= In the Dark Half =

2012 film

- Theatrical release poster
- Directed by: Alastair Siddons
- Screenplay by: Lucy Catherine
- Produced by: Margaret Matheson
- Starring: Tony Curran; Lyndsey Marshal; Jessica Barden
- Cinematography: Neus Ollé-Soronellas
- Edited by: Paul Carlin
- Music by: Dan Jones
- Production companies: BBC Films; Cinema Six; Matador Pictures; Regent Capital
- Distributed by: Verve Pictures; ContentFilm International
- Release date: 10 August 2012 (UK)
- Running time: 85 minutes
- Country: United Kingdom
- Language: English
- Budget: $464,000 (£300,000)

In the Dark Half is a 2011 British drama film directed by Alastair Siddons and starring Tony Curran, Lyndsey Marshal, and Jessica Barden. Barden plays a teenaged girl who becomes obsessed with her neighbour, played by Curran, and his grief over losing his son. It received mixed reviews.

== Plot summary ==
Marie, a 15-year-old girl, lives with Kathy, her mother, and occasionally babysits for her next door neighbour, Filthy, a poacher who is widely rumoured to have murdered his wife. Marie and Kathy have been drifting apart, with unresolved issues between them. Kathy's behaviour has been erratic and Marie believes that her mother plans to leave her. When Filthy's young son, Sean, spontaneously dies of apparently natural causes while Marie is babysitting him, Marie becomes obsessed with her neighbour and begins to think that his stories about spirits in the hills may be true.

Filthy, devastated by the loss of his son, reacts furiously when Marie loots his traps and breaks into his house to steal Sean's favourite toy. When Marie states that she needs these items in order to appease the spirits and contact his dead son, Filthy initially dismisses the myths as idle stories he told Sean. However, Filthy eventually comes to believe Marie and commits suicide to be with his son, whom he believes to be lonely. Before he dies, Filthy urges Marie to return to her own father, and Marie realises that she has repressed her mother's suicide; instead of living with her mother, she has been working through her grief and denial while ignoring her father. Having come to terms with her loss, Marie reunites with her father.

== Cast ==
- Jessica Barden as Marie
- Alfie Hepper as Sean
- Tony Curran as Filthy
- Lyndsey Marshal as Kathy
- Georgia Henshaw as Michelle
- Simon Armstrong as Steve

== Production ==
In the Dark Half was shot in Bristol, South West England, England. Producer Matheson was drawn to the script because of the quality and opportunity to work in a new genre, and director Siddons was inspired by European horror films.

== Release ==
In the Dark Half premiered at Raindance Film Festival on 8 October 2011. The United Kingdom theatrical premiere was on 10 August 2012.

== Reception ==
Rotten Tomatoes, a review aggregator, reports that 67% of nine surveyed critics gave the film a positive review; while only 26% of the forty-six surveyed users gave the film a positive review. The average rating of the film is 5.5/10. Catherine Shoard of The Guardian rated the film 3/5 stars and called it "polished and impressive", though she faulted it for requiring "slightly more patience than it consistently rewards". Philip French, also of The Guardian, wrote in a negative review that the film is "ambitious but disappointing". Writing in Time Out London, Dave Calhoun rated the film 3/5 stars and described it as a "mysterious, thoughtful experiment". Kim Newman of Empire rated it 2/5 stars and criticised the film's pacing. Josh Winning of Total Film rated the film 3/5 stars and compared it to The Sixth Sense. Reviewing the film on DVD, Ben Walsh of The Independent called it "a promising debut from Siddons".
