= Scrublands (novel) =

2018 novel by Chris Hammer

- First edition (publ. Allen & Unwin)
- Author: Chris Hammer
- Language: English
- Genre: Crime novel
- Publisher: Allen & Unwin
- Publication date: August 2018
- Publication place: Australia
- Media type: Print
- Pages: 496 pp.
- ISBN: 9781760632984
- Preceded by: -
- Followed by: Silver

Scrublands is the debut crime novel by Australian author Chris Hammer. It was published in 2018 by Allen & Unwin.

The story is set in the fictitious town of Riversend in New South Wales during a period of intense drought, and revolves around a small-town priest who kills five of his parishioners before being shot himself, and a journalist's investigation into his motivations. The novel is a crime thriller told in third person present tense.

The novel is the first to feature the author's character Martin Scarsden. It was followed by two others in the series: Silver in 2019, and Trust in 2020.

A four-part television series based on the novel was aired in 2023.

== Plot ==
In the drought-stricken town of Riversend, the charismatic priest Byron Swift, who was well liked by the community, suddenly turns violent, shooting five parishioners on a Sunday morning. Swift is then shot and killed by a local police officer. A year later journalist Martin Scarsden, haunted by war memories, arrives in Riversend to write about the impact of the crime on the town. As he interviews locals, he discovers that the official story, as reported by his newspaper, might not be entirely accurate. Martin delves into the community, uncovering differing opinions about the priest, and finds that the town has hidden complexities not evident at first glance.

== Publication history ==
Following its initial publication in 2018 by Allen and Unwin the novel was reprinted as follows:

- Allen & Unwin, Australia, 2019
- Wildfire, UK, 2019
- Atria Books, USA, 2019
- Allen & Unwin, Australia, 2023

The novel was also translated into German and Norwegian in 2019, Romanian in 2020, and Chinese, Italian and French in 2021.

== Reception ==
The book was met with generally positive reviews. The Sydney Morning Herald described it as a work of "remarkable breadth and depth", with other publications calling it stunning and a brilliant debut.

The book's detailed setting (aided by research for Hammer's previous non-fiction book, The River) is emblematic of the isolation and drought experienced in many rural Australian communities; one publication described it as "full of Australianness".

Hammer was awarded the 2019 John Creasey (New Blood) Dagger by the UK Crime Writers' Association for the book.

== TV adaptation ==
In 2019, Scrublands was optioned for television. Season 1 of the series was released on Stan on 16 November 2023 and was aired on BBC Four in the UK in the same month. A second series was announced in 2024.
