= Chris Hammer =

Australian writer and journalist (born 1960)

Chris Hammer (born 1960) is an Australian journalist and writer of crime fiction. He is known for his best-selling Martin Scarsden series of novels.

== Career ==
Hammer has a 30-year career as a journalist and has worked for The Bulletin, Fairfax and on the SBS TV program Dateline. In 2011 he published a non-fiction book entitled The River.

His Martin Scarsden series of novels have been bestsellers in several countries, starting with Scrublands in 2018. When writing his crime novels he allows the story to develop, rather than plotting it out in advance.

On 20 November 2025, it was announced at the ABC upfronts that Hammer's novel Treasure & Dirt had been optioned and turned into a television series of the same name. The series, which was filmed on location in Coober Pedy in South Australia, premiered on ABC Television and iview on 19 July 2026.

== Recognition and awards ==
Hammer won the ACT Book of the Year in 2011 for his non-fiction book The River.

His first novel, Scrublands, won the John Creasey Award at the UK Crime Writers' Association's Dagger Awards in 2019. The Tilt won the 2023 Danger Award for best crime fiction. The Seven was shortlisted for the 2024 Fiction Indie Book Award.

== Selected works ==
=== Martin Scarsden series ===
- Scrublands (2018)
- Silver (2019)
- Trust (2020)
- Legacy (2025)

=== Ivan Lucic and Nell Buchanan series ===
- Treasure and Dirt (2021) (also published as Opal Country (UK))
- The Tilt (2022) (also published as Dead Man's Creek (UK))
- The Seven (2023) (also published as Cover The Bones (UK))
- The Valley (2024) (also published as The Broken River (UK))

=== Non-fiction ===
- The River (2010)
- The Coast (2012)
