= A Faint Cold Fear =

2003 novel by Karin Slaughter

- First edition cover
- Author: Karin Slaughter
- Language: English
- Genre: Novel
- Published: 2003
- Publication place: United States
- Media type: Print (hardback & paperback)
- ISBN: 978-0688174583
- LC Class: PS3569.L275 F35
- Preceded by: Kisscut

A Faint Cold Fear is the third novel in the Grant County series by author Karin Slaughter. It was originally published in hardback in 2003. Previous books in the series are Blindsighted, and Kisscut. It features the characters Jeffrey Tolliver, Lena Adams, and Sara Linton.

== Plot summary ==
While at the Dairy Queen with her pregnant sister Tessa, Sara is called to meet Jeffrey at the scene of an apparent suicide on campus property, a suicide they both later agree seems suspicious although they cannot quite put their fingers on why. Tessa asks to go along and Sara, against her better judgment, allows it. As Sara is examining the body, Tessa walks into the woods to relieve herself. Also on hand are Lena, who has quit the force and now works for campus security, and her new boss, steroidal creep Chuck Gaines. Chuck identifies the victim as the son of two campus professors, a development sure to complicate the case enormously for Jeffrey. When Tessa doesn't come out of the woods, a search finds her stabbed repeatedly and barely alive; she is airlifted to Grady Hospital in Atlanta. While Sara and her parents wait tensely by Tessa's bedside, Jeffrey and Lena work the case while at each other's throats over Lena's decision to quit the force. Another suicide occurs, more suspicious than the last, and as Lena spirals further out of control with alcohol and drugs, she makes a fateful and perhaps fatal connection with student Ethan Green, who is not what he appears to be.

== Sources ==
- New Mystery Reader review and interview
- Official Karin Slaughter website page
- Reading Group Guides page on A Faint Cold Fear
- BookReporter.com review
- Amazon page on A Faint Cold Fear
- Romantic Times
