= Karin Slaughter =

American crime writer (born 1971)

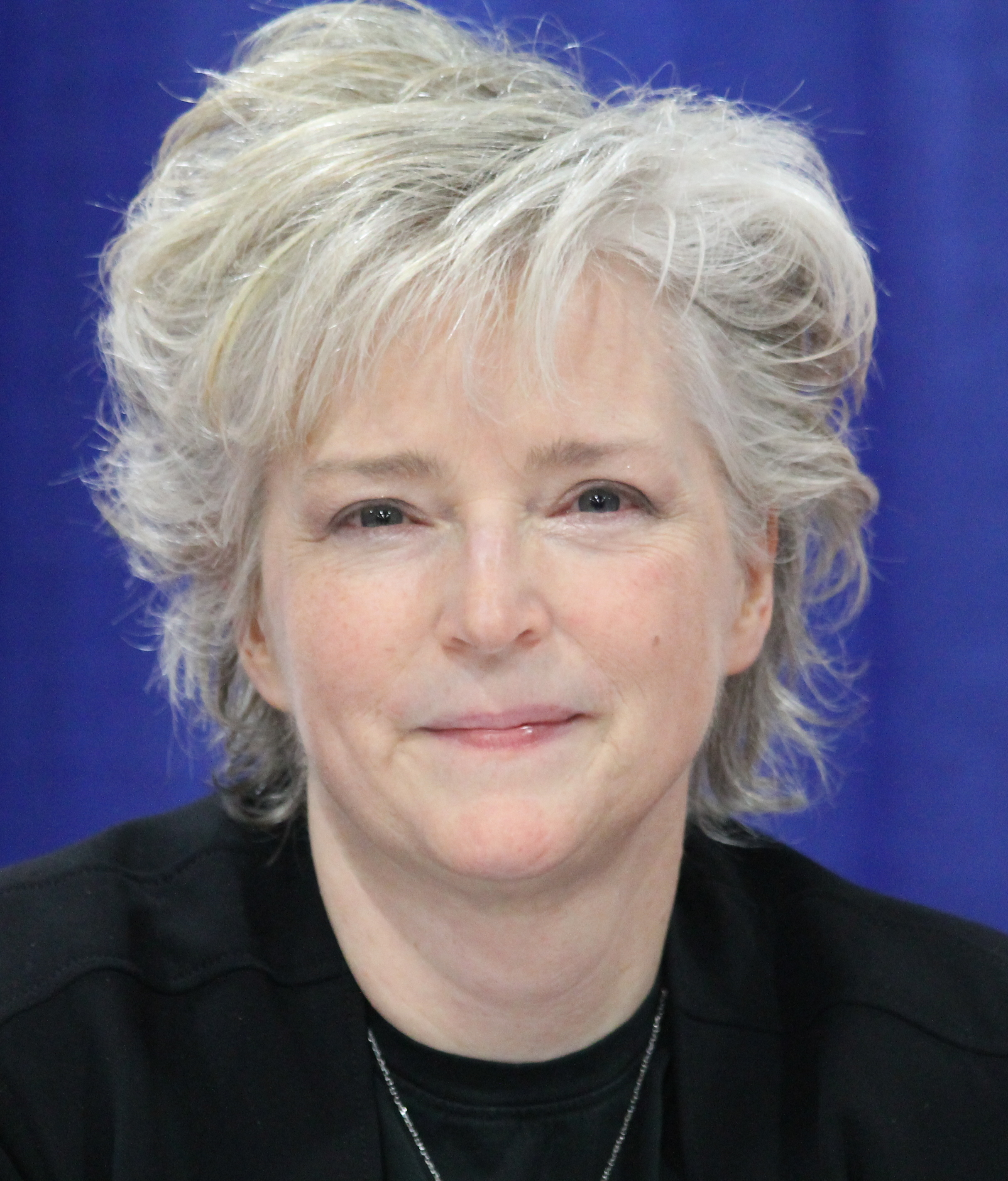
- Slaughter at the 2026 National Book Festival
- Born: January 6, 1971 (age 55); Georgia, U.S.
- Occupation: Writer
- Writing career
- Years active: 2001–present
- Genres: Crime Fiction, Mystery, Thriller

Karin Slaughter (born January 6, 1971) is an American crime writer. She is the #1 New York Times bestselling author of more than twenty-five novels, including the Edgar-nominated Cop Town and standalone novels Pretty Girls and False Witness. An international bestseller, Slaughter is published in 120 countries with more than 40 million copies sold across the globe.

Her first novel, Blindsighted (2001), was published in 27 languages and made the Crime Writers' Association's Dagger Award shortlist for "Best Thriller Debut" of 2001. Slaughter won the 2015 CWA Ian Fleming Steel Dagger award for her novel Cop Town.

Pieces of Her, based on her novel of the same name, debuted at #1 worldwide on Netflix as an original series in 2022. Her bestselling thriller series, Will Trent, is now a television series in its 4th season on ABC. The Good Daughter is a limited series on Peacock starring Rose Byrne and Meghann Fahy.

She is the founder of the Save the Libraries project—a nonprofit organization established to support libraries and library programming.

== Writing ==
=== North Falls series (2025 to present) ===
Slaughter's newest series is set in the fictional North Falls region in rural Georgia, featuring Officer Emmy Cliffton and her family.

- We Are All Guilty Here, 2025
- The Secrets We Hide, 2026

The first book in the series, We Are All Guilty Here, was a New York Times #1 bestseller.

=== Will Trent series (2006 to present) ===
The Will Trent series, which takes place in Atlanta, Georgia, features Georgia Bureau of Investigation special agent Will Trent and his partner, Faith Mitchell. So far, the Will Trent series includes:

- Triptych, 2006
- Fractured, 2008
- Undone, 2009
- Broken, 2010
- Fallen, 2011
- Criminal, 2012
- Unseen, 2013
- The Kept Woman, 2016
- The Last Widow, 2019
- The Silent Wife, 2020
- After That Night, 2023
- This is Why We Lied, 2024

Characters from Slaughter's two main series, Grant County and Will Trent, were brought together in her novels Undone (2009), titled Genesis internationally, and Broken (2010). In these novels, Sara Linton and Will Trent work cases set in Georgia.

=== Grant County series (2001 to 2007) ===
Slaughter first came to attention with her Grant County series:

- Blindsighted, 2001
- Kisscut, 2002
- A Faint Cold Fear, 2003
- Indelible, 2004
- Faithless, 2005
- Beyond Reach/Skin Privilege, 2007

Set in the fictional town of Heartsdale, Georgia, in the fictional Grant County, the narrative takes place from the perspective of three main characters: Sara Linton, the town's pediatrician and part-time coroner; Jeffrey Tolliver, Linton's ex-husband and the chief of police; and his subordinate, detective Lena Adams.

=== Standalone Novels ===
- Cop Town, 2014
- Pretty Girls, 2015
- The Good Daughter, 2017
- Pieces of Her, 2018
- False Witness, 2021
- Girl, Forgotten, 2022

Pieces of Her reached #2 on the New York Times bestseller list, the week it was released in late August 2018. Pieces of Her was published through HarperCollins and follows a young woman who learns about a hidden side of her mother, Laura. It was given a positive review by Publishers Weekly and Kirkus Reviews.

Cop Town, Pretty Girls, The Good Daughter, and False Witness have all also been New York Times bestsellers.

=== Short Stories and Novellas ===
- Like a Charm, 2004
- Martin Misunderstood, 2008
- Thorn in My Side, 2011
- The Unremarkable Heart and Other Stories, 2011
- Snatched, 2012
- Busted, 2012
- Blonde Hair, Blue Eyes, 2015
- Cold, Cold Heart, 2016
- Last Breath, 2017
- Cleaning the Gold, 2019

“Like a Charm” is a short story anthology featuring several thriller authors, including Lee Child, Peter Robinson, John Connolly, and Laura Lippman. Each story is linked by a charm bracelet that brings bad luck to its owners. Karin Slaughter wrote the first and last stories.

The audiobook version of Martin Misunderstood is narrated by Wayne Knight. Both the story and the narration were nominated for an Audie Award in 2009.

The Unremarkable Heart won the Edgar Award for Best Short Story in 2013.

== Television and Film ==
=== Pieces of Her ===
Slaughter's 2018 standalone novel, Pieces of Her, was adapted into an eight-episode TV series of the same name, which premiered on March 4, 2022. Starring Toni Collette and Bella Heathcote, it debuted at #1 worldwide on Netflix. Between February 27, 2022, and April 3, 2022, the series was watched 227.5 million hours on Netflix globally.

=== Will Trent ===
Slaughter's bestselling thriller series, Will Trent, is now a television series starring Ramón Rodríguez in the role of Will Trent and Erika Christensen as Angie. Premiering on January 3, 2023 on ABC, the series has now been renewed for a fourth season slated to premiere on January 6, 2026.

=== The Good Daughter ===
Production began in 2025 on The Good Daughter, a limited series for Peacock adapted from her novel of the same name and starring Rose Byrne and Meghann Fahy.

== Philanthropy ==
Slaughter is a library advocate and founded Save the Libraries, a non-profit organization that campaigns to support US public libraries. The Save the Libraries fund has provided more than $300,000 to the DeKalb County Public Library in Atlanta, Georgia.

== Awards and Honors ==
Slaughter has won or been nominated for many awards. In reverse chronological order, they are:

- 2025, Library Reads Hall of Fame Pick
- 2024, Amazon Editors Pick—Best Books of The Year
- 2023 & 2022, Winner of the Audiophile Earphones Award
- 2020, Ned Kelly Award
- 2019, Georgia Author of the Year
- 2019, International Thriller Writers Awards Finalist
- 2018, The Skimm Book Club
- 2017, Romantic Times Lifetime Achievement Award Winner, Suspense
- 2017, AudioFile Best Book of the Year (AudioFile Earphones Award)
- 2017, Crime Writers' Association Ian Fleming Steel Dagger Award Longlist
- 2016, International Thriller Writers Awards Finalist
- 2016, People’s Choice Award Winner
- 2015, Edgar Nomination, Best Novel, Cop Town
- 2015, American Association of People with Disabilities Image Award
- 2015, Crime Writers' Association Ian Fleming Steel Dagger Award, Winner, Cop Town
- 2014, AudioFile Magazine Earphones Award Winner, Cop Town, 2013
- 2014, Crime Zone, The Silver Fingerprint Winner, Best Foreign Thriller, Unseen
- 2014, Anthony Bouchercon Nomination, Best Short Story, The Unremarkable Heart
- 2014, Edgar Award Winner, Best Short Story
- 2013, Mystery Readers International Macavity award nomination, Best Short Story, The Unremarkable Heart
- 2011, Crime Zone, The Silver Fingerprint Winner, Best Foreign Thriller, Fallen
- 2011, International Thriller Writers Silver Bullet Award Winner
- 2010, Suspense Magazine Best of 2010 Winner, Thriller/Suspense, Broken
- 2009, Le Livre de Poche Prix Lecteurs Winner, Faithless
- 2009, Crime Zone the Silver Fingerprint Winner, Best Foreign Thriller, Fractured
- 2009, Audio Publishers association Audie Nomination, Humor, Martin Misunderstood
- 2009, Left Coast Crime Hawaii Five-0 Nomination, Best Law Enforcement/Police Procedural, Fractured
- 2008, ITV Crime Thriller International Author of the Year Nomination, Best Fiction, Beyond Reach
- 2008, Georgia Author of the Year Nomination, Best Fiction, Beyond Reach
- 2007, Crime Zone the Silver Fingerprint Winner, Best Foreign Thriller, Beyond Reach
- 2007, Crime Writers' Association Ian Fleming Steel Dagger nomination, Best Thriller, Triptych
- 2003, Romantic Times Reviewers’ Choice Awards Winner, Best Contemporary Mystery, A Faint Cold
- 2002, Mystery Readers International Macavity Award Nomination, Best First Mystery, Blindsighted
- 2002, International Thriller Writers Barry Award Nomination, Best First Novel, Blindsighted
- 2001, Crime Writers' Association Dagger Award Nomination, Best Thriller Debut, Blindsighted

== Published Works ==
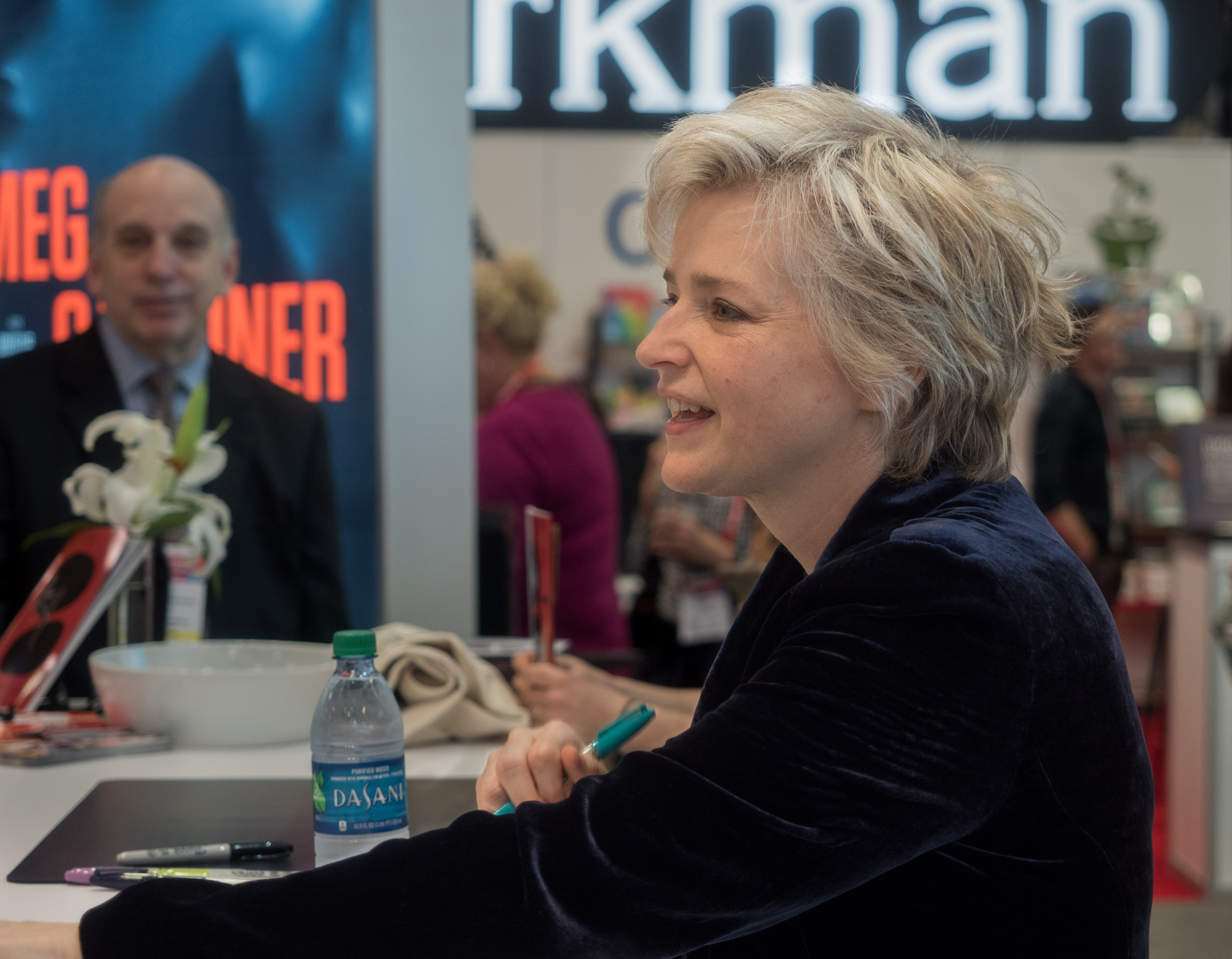
Slaughter at BookExpo America in 2019

The Grant County series

- Blindsighted (2001)
- Kisscut (2002)
- A Faint Cold Fear (2003)
- Indelible (2004)
- Faithless, (2005)
- Beyond Reach (2007), Skin Privilege (UK title)

The Will Trent series

- Triptych (2006)
- Fractured (2008)
- Undone (2009), Genesis (UK/Australia title)
- Broken (2010)
- Fallen (2011)
- Criminal (2012)
- Unseen (2013)
- The Kept Woman (2016)
- The Last Widow (2019)
- The Silent Wife (2020)
- After That Night (2023)
- This is Why We Lied (2024)

Andrea Oliver Series

- Pieces of Her (2018)
- Girl, Forgotten (2022)

North Falls Series

- We Are All Guilty Here (2025)
- The Secrets We Hide (2026)

Standalone Novels

- Cop Town (2014)
- Pretty Girls (2015)
- The Good Daughter (2017)
- False Witness (2021)

Short Stories and Novellas

- Like a Charm (2004, editor)
- Martin Misunderstood (2008)
- Thorn in My Side (2011, digital short story)
- The Unremarkable Heart and Other Stories (2011, audio short story)
- Snatched (2012, digital novella)
- Busted (2012, digital novella)
- Blonde Hair, Blue Eyes (2015, digital short story, prequel to Pretty Girls)
- Cold, Cold Heart (2016, digital short story)
- Last Breath (2017, digital short story, prequel to The Good Daughter)
- Cleaning the Gold (2019, digital short story, co-written with Lee Child)

== Personal life ==
Slaughter was born in Covington, Georgia and grew up in Lake Spivey. She has two older sisters. She attended Morrow High School in Morrow, Georgia. She then studied literature at Georgia State University, but dropped out prior to graduating. She wrote her first novel Blindsighted in three months.
