= Pieces of Her =

2018 thriller novel by Karin Slaughter

- Author: Karin Slaughter
- Language: English
- Genre: Thriller
- Published: August 21, 2018
- Publisher: William Morrow and Company and HarperCollins Publishers
- Publication place: United States
- Media type: Print (hardback and paperback); Audiobook; E-book
- Pages: 480 (hardcover)
- ISBN: 978-0062430274

Pieces of Her is a thriller novel by American author Karin Slaughter, published on August 21, 2018 by William Morrow and Company and HarperCollins Publishers. The novel has been adapted into a television series of the same name.

== Summary ==
On her 30th birthday, Andrea Oliver celebrates the occasion at a local diner with her mother, Laura. Moments later, she witnesses the unthinkable on a day that would forever change her life. After her mother attempts to stop a shooter from killing more victims, Andrea notices that Laura has flipped the script and watches her violently dispose of the threat. Visibly shaken, Andrea is left with wavering thoughts and conflicted feelings about her mother's actions. Soon after, video footage of the incident at the diner becomes a viral hit, exposing Laura's identity to her past enemies. As Andrea begins to gather the pieces of Laura's past on her journey to uncover the real identity that her mother has forsaken long ago, what other truths will she find?

== Reception ==
Richard Lipez from The Washington Post said: "The characters keep you involved all the way, as does the vivid writing." Regina Angeli of Iron Mountain Daily News labeled Pieces of Her as a "clever story concerning the delicate relationship of mothers and daughters" with emphasis on "the old woodsman's adage that there is nothing more dangerous than a mother bear when it comes time to protect her cub."

== TV adaptation ==
On February 5, 2019, it was announced that Netflix had given the production a series order for a first season. The series was created by Lesli Linka Glatter, Charlotte Stoudt and Bruna Papandrea, all of whom were expected to executive produce. In February 2020, Toni Collette and Bella Heathcote were cast in starring roles. The series was released on March 4, 2022.
