= Blindsighted =

2001 crime novel by Karin Slaughter

- Author: Karin Slaughter
- Publication date: May 1, 2001
- ISBN: 978-0-09-949225-2
- Followed by: Kisscut

Blindsighted is a 2001 crime novel by American writer Karin Slaughter. It was Slaughter's first novel, and the first in the Grant County series of novels featuring the character of Sara Linton.

== Background ==
On writing Blindsighted, Slaughter told Entertainment Weekly, "I felt like women's stories were not being told by women...I really found my voice when I started writing crimes that happen to women from a woman's perspective."

Blindsighted is the first in the Grant County series, which includes 6 books. The final book in the series was published in 2007. The character of Sara Linton also appears in Slaughter's "Will Trent" series, beginning with Undone (2009).

== Plot ==
Dr. Sara Linton, a pediatrician and part-time coroner in Grant County, Georgia, receives a postcard with a message that reads "Why hast thou forsaken me?". Later, she discovers a local blind university professor dead in the bathroom of a diner, having been stabbed and sexually assaulted. Linton works with Jeffrey Tolliver, who is the police chief and Linton's ex-husband, as well as detective Lena Adams, the twin sister of the murdered professor, to solve the crime. The investigation forces Linton to confront memories of her own sexual assault twelve years earlier.

== Reception ==
Blindsighted was shortlisted for the CWA New Blood Dagger Award in 2001.
