= Kisscut =

2002 novel by Karin Slaughter

Kisscut is the second book in the Grant County series by author Karin Slaughter. It was originally released in hardback in 2002. The previous book in the series is Blindsighted. These books star Sara Linton, Jeffrey Tolliver, and Lena Adams.

== Book summary ==
Sara and Jeffrey have tentatively resumed their romantic relationship when, on a hot August night during the summer following Blindsighted, Jeffrey is forced to shoot a 13-year-old girl to stop her from killing another teenager. What at first appears to be an unwanted pregnancy and a jilting turned deadly spurs an investigation that reveals the presence of real-life monsters preying on the children of Grant County. During its course Jeffrey battles self-doubt and remorse over killing a child, and an impromptu trip back to his hometown of Sylacauga, Alabama offers up a major clue. Lena, who just returned to duty a month earlier following her torture at the hands of the man who murdered her beloved sister and terrorized Heartsdale, fights misplaced guilt and shame, battling suicidal tendencies and struggling to regain some minute sense of normalcy in her life. Even as she contemplates quitting the police, the only thing that provides her with relief is work, and as she immerses herself more and deeper into the case she finds an uncomfortable feeling of identification with one of its most damaged victims.

== Book covers ==
US Kisscut rerelease cover

UK Kisscut cover

Original Kisscut hardback cover

Original Kisscut paperback
