= Endemol Australia =

Australian TV production company

- Formerly: Hanna-Barbera Australia (1972–1983); Taft-Hardie Group (1983–1988); Southern Star Group (1988–2014)
- Type: Subsidiary
- Industry: Animation; Television production
- Founded: 1972; 54 years ago
- Founder: Kevin Weldon (as Hanna-Barbera Australia); Neil Balnaves (as Southern Star Group)
- Defunct: 2015; 11 years ago
- Fate: Merged with Shine Australia to form Endemol Shine Australia
- Successor: Endemol Shine Australia
- Headquarters: Sydney, New South Wales, Australia
- Key people: Mark and Carl Fennessy (2016)
- Parent: Hanna-Barbera (1972–1988); Hamlyn Group (1974–1978); James Hardie (1978–1988); Southern Cross Broadcasting (2004–2007); Fairfax Media (2007–2009); Endemol (2009–2015)
- Subsidiaries: Endemol Southern Star (2000–2009)

Endemol Australia, formerly known as Southern Star Group, Southern Star Productions, Southern Star/Hanna-Barbera Australia and Taft-Hardie Group, was a major Australian independent television production, distribution, and syndication company. On 26 July 2015, the company was merged with Shine Australia to succeed it as Endemol Shine Australia.

== History ==
Southern Star logo used from 1989 to 2013

The company began in 1972 as Hanna-Barbera Pty Ltd (Australia), an Australian division of Hanna-Barbera (which was founded by Kevin Weldon). In 1974, the Hamlyn Group's Australian division managed by Kevin Weldon acquired 50% of Hanna-Barbera Australia and appointed Neil Balnaves as managing director. In 1978, James Hardie acquired the Hamlyn Group, and in 1979, Balnaves was promoted to managing director of the entire Hamlyn Group.

In 1983, James Hardie and Hanna-Barbera corporate parent Taft Broadcasting reorganised the division as Taft-Hardie Group Pty Ltd. In 1984, the company established a division in Los Angeles known as Southern Star Productions, founded and headed by Buzz Potamkin. Programs produced by this division would be animated at Hanna-Barbera's studios in Sydney, and carried the name Southern Star/Hanna-Barbera Australia. It co-owned CIC Video's Australian video unit called CIC-Taft Video and launched a video label, THG Video, in 1984, then renamed to Taft Video in 1987. In 1987, it made a $42 million bid for Communications and Entertainment Limited, but it never realised.

In 1988, Neil Balnaves led an A$11 million management buyout of Taft-Hardie, reorganising the company as Southern Star Group. The home video division was renamed to Southern Star Video in 1989. The Sydney animation facilities were also sold to The Walt Disney Company who turned it into Disney Animation Australia, while the Los Angeles division continued to operate until 1991 when it was sold to Turner Broadcasting System.

In October 1995, Southern Star Entertainment had entered the interactive software publishing business and expanded into the American operations and the North American multimedia software market by reuniting with former parent & American broadcasting & radio network company Taft Broadcasting to jointly form Southern Star's new interactive publishing arm based in Manhattan, New York City and to develop multimedia CD-ROM software & publish Southern Star's properties & develop gaming software in-house, entitled Southern Star Interactive, the new interactive publishing division will focus on adapting classic literature into multimedia computer games and educational tools, releasing titles on PC and Mac CD-ROM with Jeff Hixon serving as president & creative director of Southern Star's interactive arm Southern Star Interactive. But however two years later in December 1997 due to steep financial losses and the decline of the CD-ROM market, Southern Star Entertainment announced it had exited the interactive software publishing business by closing its New York City-based American interactive publishing division Southern Star Interactive in order for Southern Star to focus on its core television production and distribution business, however they'll start to license its intellectual properties to outside third-party publishing companies and game developers.

In August 2000, Southern Star Entertainment had teamed up with Dutch entertainment production & distribution outfit Endemol Entertainment by merging Southern Star's unscripted, light entertainment & infotainment production divisions into formed a joint venture production division entitled Southern Star Endemol, that would produce & adapt Endemol's programming such as Big Brother and Deal or No Deal into the Australian production markets while Endemol would distribute them internationally.

In February 2001, Southern Star Entertainment had teamed up with Glasgow-based British independent production company Wark Clements (now IWC Media) to launch a joint documentary and factual production unit that would focus on international non-fiction & factual television markets called Factual Factory, the new joint documentary & factual production unit would co-create and produce global documentary and factual programming while Wark Clements would produce the factual & documentary programming while Southern Star Entertainment's distribution division Southern Star Sales would serve as distributor for programming made by Factual Factory, starting with The First World War.

In April 2004, the company was acquired by Southern Cross Broadcasting and in 2007 by Fairfax Media.

In August 2008, Southern Star Group had sold its 75% majority stake in Carnival Films to NBCUniversal and had it placed into its international production division NBCUniversal International Television Production with Southern Star Group also sold its distribution rights to Carnival's productions to the latter.

In January 2009, Endemol acquired Southern Star Factual from Fairfax Media in a transaction worth A$75 million, effective shuttering Endemol Southern Star.

Southern Star Productions' founder, Buzz Potamkin, died from pancreatic cancer on 22 April 2012, at the age of 66.

On 11 December 2013, Southern Star announced it would rebrand as Endemol Australia, completing the rollout by February 2014. The change was brought about by Chief Executive Officer, Janeen Faithfull.

On 15 November 2016, Mark and Carl Fennessy were appointed joint CEOs of Endemol Australia as well as its parent company, Endemol Shine Australia.

Southern Star Group's founder, Neil Balnaves, died on 21 February 2022 in a boating accident, at the age of 77, while holidaying with his wife, Diane, in Tahiti.

Hanna-Barbera Pty Ltd (Australia)'s founder, Kevin Weldon, died peacefully 'content to have lived a full, lucky and blessed life', surrounded by family and loved ones, on 9 November 2023, at the age of 89.

Turner Broadcasting System's founder, Ted Turner, died at his home in Lamont, Florida, on 6 May 2026, at the age of 87.

The Hanna-Barbera/Taft-Hardie Group library is currently distributed by Skydance Corporation through Warner Bros. Animation.

== Programs ==
=== Prime-time drama ===
==== As Hanna-Barbera / Taft-Hardie Group ====
- Deadline (1982, TV movie)
- Return to Eden (1983–1986)
- Remember Me (1985, TV movie)
- The Last Frontier (1986, TV miniseries)
- Shark's Paradise (1986, TV movie)

==== As Southern Star ====
- Party Tricks
- Offspring
- Return to Eden
- Love My Way
- The Surgeon
- Blue Heelers
- The Secret Life of Us
- Always Greener
- Water Rats
- Marking Time
- Police Rescue
- Murder Call
- Rescue: Special Ops
- Wild Boys
- Rush
- Young Lions
- Blue Murder
- Dangerous
- Out of the Blue
- Fireflies
- Spirited
- Rain Shadow
- The Alice
- Tangle
- Puberty Blues
- Bed of Roses
- Big Sky
- Howzat! Kerry Packer's War
- McLeod's Daughters (2001–2009)
- City Homicide
- Echo Point
- The Beautiful Lie
- Cody
- Which Way Home
- Good Vibrations
- Gallipoli
- Paper Giants: The Birth of Cleo
- Paper Giants: Magazine Wars
- Children of the Dragon
- Beaconsfield (TV movie)
- Power Games: The Packer-Murdoch War
- Police Crop: The Winchester Conspiracy (TV movie)
- On the Beach (TV movie)
- Joh's Jury (TV movie)
- Dripping in Chocolate
- Hard Knox
- Do or Die
- Police State (TV movie)
- A Difficult Woman
- Marshall Law
- Ring of Scorpio
- Secret Men's Business (TV movie)

=== Comedy ===
- Bad Cop, Bad Cop
- The Bob Morrison Show
- Dayne's World
- Legally Brown
- You Have Been Watching
- Con's Bewdiful Holiday Videos

=== Kids & family ===
==== Animation outsourced from Hanna-Barbera USA ====
- Wait Till Your Father Gets Home (1972–1974) (season 1 and some episodes of seasons 2 & 3)
- The New Scooby-Doo Movies (1973) (season 2)
- Valley of the Dinosaurs (1974)
- Clue Club (1976)
- The Robonic Stooges (1977–1978)
- Wonder Wheels (1977)
- The All New Popeye Hour (1978–1983)
- The Flintstones Meet Rockula and Frankenstone (1979, TV movie)
- Casper's Halloween Special (1979, TV special)
- Casper's First Christmas (1979, TV special)
- The Fonz and the Happy Days Gang (1980–1981)
- The Flintstones: Wind-Up Wilma (1981, TV special)
- Laverne & Shirley in the Army (1981–1982)
- Mork & Mindy/Laverne & Shirley/Fonz Hour (1982–1983)
- Yogi Bear's All Star Comedy Christmas Caper (1982, TV special)
- The Dukes (1983) (season 2)
- Pac-Man (1983) (season 2)
- Pink Panther and Sons (1984)
- The 13 Ghosts of Scooby-Doo (1985)
- Snorks (1987) (season 3)
- Pound Puppies (1987) (season 2)
- Scooby-Doo Meets the Boo Brothers (1987)
- Top Cat and the Beverly Hills Cats (1988)

==== As Hanna-Barbera / Taft-Hardie Group ====
- Famous Classic Tales (1973–1983)
- The Toothbrush Family (1974)
- Taggart's Treasure (1976) (unsold pilot)
- The Flintstones: Little Big League (1978, TV movie)
- Dinky Dog (1978–1981)
- Drak Pack (1980)
- The Kwicky Koala Show (1981–1982)
- CBS Storybreak (1985–1989) (co-production with CBS Entertainment Productions)
- The Berenstain Bears (1985–1987)
- Teen Wolf (1986–1987) (co-production with Clubhouse Pictures in Season 1 and Atlantic/Kushner-Locke in Season 2)

==== As Southern Star ====
- A*mazing
- Foreign Exchange
- The Adventures of Sam
- The Beeps
- Blue Water High
- RAGGS Kids Club Band
- The Sleepover Club
- Tracey McBean
- Cake Business!
- The Missed Christmas Presents
- The Adventures of Bottle Top Bill and His Best Friend Corky
- Magic Mountain
- Snobs
- Bananas in Pyjamas (co-production with ABC)
- Faireez
- Ketchup: Cats Who Cook
- Time Masters
- Wipeout
- Marvin: Baby of the Year (TV special)
- Cartoon All-Stars to the Rescue (TV special)
- Fox's Peter Pan & the Pirates (co-production with TMS Entertainment and Fox Children's Productions, distributed by 20th Television)
- Mad Scientist
- Hi-5 (2008–2012) (co-production with Nine Network)
- Elly & Jools
- Kangaroo Creek Gang
- Don't Blame The Koalas
- Pig's Breakfast
- In Your Dreams
- Outriders
- Sea Princesses
- Y?
- A gURLs wURLd
- High Flyers
- All for Kids
- Hairy Legs
- Classic Tales
- Sumo Mouse
- Snake Tales
- Skippy the Bush Kangaroo
- Arthur! and the Square Knights of the Round Table
- The Wayne Manifesto
- Gordon the Garden Gnome

=== Reality ===
- RPA – (1995–2012)
- Ralph TV – (2007)
- Battlefronts – (2008)
- Monster House – (2008)
- Garden Angels – (2009)
- No Leave, No Life – (2009–2012)
- Beauty and the Geek Australia – (2010–2011)
- Drug Lords – (2010)
- Real Prison Breaks – (2010–2011)
- Strictly Speaking – (2010)
- Undercover Boss Australia – (2010–2011)
- Balls of Steel Australia – (2011–2012)
- Big Brother Australia – Network 10 (2001–2008) and Nine Network (2012–2014)
- Don't Tell the Bride – (2012)
- When Love Comes to Town – (2014)
- Mesmerised – (2015)
- Married at First Sight Australia – (2015–present)
- The Hotplate – (2015)

=== Factual & Documentary ===
- Animal Emergency
- Animal Lifeline
- Animals Did It First
- At the Zoo
- Crash Test Mummies & Daddies
- Elephants Empire
- Forensic Investigators
- Last Chance Surgery
- Next Wave
- Saving Africa's Witch Children
- Secret China
- Secret Nature
- Wild China
- Wild Orphans
- Meerkat Manor

== Films ==
- beDevil (1993)
- No Worries (1994)
- The Sum of Us (1994)
- Rough Diamonds (1994)
- The Well (1997)
- Serenades (2001)

== See also ==
- List of film production companies
- List of television production companies
