= List of The Secret Life of Us episodes =

The Secret Life of Us is an Australian television drama. It premiered on Network Ten on 16 July 2001. The show traces the lives of eight twenty-somethings sharing a Melbourne apartment block who are all looking for the same thing — love, sex, romance, success — and anything else that's worth going after. The problem is they have not worked out how to get it yet — so they make it up as they go along. During the course of the series, 86 episodes of The Secret Life of Us aired over four seasons, between 16 July 2001 and 28 December 2005.

== Series overview ==
Series	Episodes	Originally released	
Series	Episodes	First released	Last released
1	22	16 July 2001	26 November 2001
2	22	18 February 2002	5 August 2002
3	22	10 February 2003	11 August 2003
4	20	18 February 2004	28 December 2005

== Episodes ==
=== Season 1 (2001) ===
No. overall	No. in season	Title	Directed by	Written by	Original release date
1	1	"Telemovie – Part 1"	Lynn-Maree Danzey	Christopher Lee & Judi McCrossin	16 July 2001
2	2	"Telemovie – Part 2"	Lynn-Maree Danzey	Christopher Lee & Judi McCrossin	16 July 2001
3	3	"The Unbelievable Truth"	Daniel Nettheim	Judi McCrossin	23 July 2001
4	4	"The Garden of Gethsemane"	Daniel Nettheim	Judi McCrossin	30 July 2001
5	5	"The Rules"	Cate Shortland	Christopher Lee	6 August 2001
6	6	"Expect The Unexpected"	Cate Shortland	Judi McCrossin	13 August 2001
7	7	"The Road Less Taken"	Stuart McDonald	Judi McCrossin	20 August 2001
8	8	"What Am I?"	Stuart McDonald	Christopher Lee	27 August 2001
9	9	"The Secret Life of Us"	Richard Jasek	Judi McCrossin	3 September 2001
10	10	"State of Limbo"	Kate Dennis	Judi McCrossin & David Ogilvy	3 September 2001
11	11	"Love Sucks"	Kate Dennis	Christopher Lee	10 September 2001
12	12	"Fallout"	Daniel Nettheim	Judi McCrossin	17 September 2001
13	13	"Secrets and Lies"	Stuart McDonald	Jessica Adams & Judi McCrossin	24 September 2001
14	14	"Better the Devil You Know"	Stuart McDonald	Elizabeth Coleman	1 October 2001
15	15	"The Gap"	Daniel Nettheim	Tony McNamara	8 October 2001
16	16	"The Butterfly Effect"	Roger Hodgman	Andrew Kelly	15 October 2001
17	17	"Piggy-in-the-Middle"	Roger Hodgman	Elizabeth Coleman	22 October 2001
18	18	"Intimations of Mortality"	Richard Jasek	Christopher Lee	29 October 2001
19	19	"A Friend Indeed"	Cate Shortland	Tony McNamara	5 November 2001
20	20	"Men on the Verge"	Cate Shortland	Roger Monk	12 November 2001
21	21	"Doorway"	Declan Eames	Christopher Lee	19 November 2001
22	22	"Now or Never"	Declan Eames	Judi McCrossin	26 November 2001

=== Season 2 (2002) ===
No. overall	No. in season	Title	Directed by	Written by	Original release date
23	1	"A New World Order"	Cate Shortland	Judi McCrossin	18 February 2002
24	2	"Free Will"	Cate Shortland	Andrew Kelly	25 February 2002
25	3	"The Dance"	Ian Watson	Christopher Lee	4 March 2002
26	4	"An Ill Wind"	Ian Watson	Liz Doran	11 March 2002
27	5	"The Grand Delusion"	Cate Shortland	Tony McNamara	18 March 2002
28	6	"It's Not Easy"	Cate Shortland	Jacquelin Perske	8 April 2002
29	7	"A Fine Line"	Kate Dennis	Judi McCrossin	15 April 2002
30	8	"Make Up Your Mind"	Kate Dennis	Christopher Lee	22 April 2002
31	9	"Controlling the Universe"	Roger Hodgman	Debra Oswald	29 April 2002
32	10	"Between a Rock and a Hard Place"	Roger Hodgman	Judi McCrossin	6 May 2002
33	11	"The Funny Side"	Stuart McDonald	Andrew Kelly	13 May 2002
34	12	"Who Do You Want to Be Today?"	Stuart McDonald	Tony McNamara	20 May 2002
35	13	"From Little Things Big Things Grow"	Daina Reid	Elizabeth Coleman	27 May 2002
36	14	"Rose Coloured Glasses"	Daina Reid	Judi McCrossin	3 June 2002
37	15	"Have a Little Faith"	Roger Hodgman	Jacquelin Perske	17 June 2002
38	16	"The Great Divide"	Roger Hodgman	Christopher Lee	24 June 2002
39	17	"Sweet Revenge"	Stuart McDonald	Judi McCrossin	1 July 2002
40	18	"Signs of Life"	Stuart McDonald	Roger Monk	8 July 2002
41	19	"The Searchers"	Daniel Nettheim	Christopher Lee	15 July 2002
42	20	"Walpurgisnacht"	Daniel Nettheim	Christopher Lee & Hamish Wright	22 July 2002
43	21	"Do the Right Thing"	Cherie Nowlan	Tony McNamara	29 July 2002
44	22	"Truth Is Beautiful... But So Are Lies"	Cherie Nowlan	Judi McCrossin	5 August 2002

=== Season 3 (2003) ===
No. overall	No. in season	Title	Directed by	Written by	Original release date
45	1	"The End Is the Beginning"	Roger Hodgman	Judi McCrossin	10 February 2003
46	2	"The Cycle"	Roger Hodgman	Christopher Lee	17 February 2003
47	3	"You Can't Always Get What You Want"	Daniel Nettheim	Christopher Lee	24 February 2003
48	4	"The Way We Are"	Daniel Nettheim	Judi McCrossin	3 March 2003
49	5	"A Square Peg in a Round Hole"	Kate Dennis	Judi McCrossin	10 March 2002
50	6	"The Quality of My Life"	Kate Dennis	Judi McCrossin	17 March 2003
51	7	"This Is Now"	Ana Kokkinos	Jacquelin Perske	31 March 2003
52	8	"The Art of Deception"	Ana Kokkinos	Judi McCrossin	7 April 2003
53	9	"Nature or Nurture?"	Shawn Seet	Liz Doran	28 April 2003
54	10	"Fair Play"	Shawn Seet	Tony McNamara	5 May 2003
55	11	"The Day No Trumpets Sounded"	Cate Shortland	Judi McCrossin	12 May 2003
56	12	"The Innocents"	Cate Shortland	Judi McCrossin	19 May 2003
57	13	"Great Expectations"	Claudia Karvan	Christopher Lee	26 May 2003
58	14	"The People You Meet"	Claudia Karvan	Tony McNamara	2 June 2003
59	15	"Weird Species Man"	Kate Dennis	Michael Miller	9 June 2003
60	16	"Be True"	Kate Dennis	Jacquelin Perske	16 June 2003
61	17	"The Dark Side"	Stuart McDonald	Hamish Wright	23 June 2003
62	18	"Only the Brave, or the Dumb"	Stuart McDonald	Tony McNamara	30 June 2003
63	19	"Outside the Loop"	Daina Reid	Michael Miller	6 July 2003
64	20	"The Saturn Return"	Daina Reid	Christopher Lee	13 July 2003
65	21	"Playing with Fire"	Roger Hodgman	Judi McCrossin	20 July 2003
66	22	"Let the Burning Begin"	Roger Hodgman	Judi McCrossin	27 July 2003

=== Season 4 (2004–2005) ===
No. overall	No. in season	Title	Directed by	Written by	Original release date
67	1	"The Truth About Cats and Dogs: Part 1"	Roger Hodgman	Michael Miller	18 February 2004
68	2	"The Truth About Cats and Dogs: Part 2"	Roger Hodgman	Michael Miller	25 February 2004
69	3	"Stretching the Friendship"	Ana Kokkinos	Tony McNamara	3 March 2004
70	4	"The Mysteries of Attraction"	Ana Kokkinos	Ellie Beaumont	20 January 2005
71	5	"Kicking the Habit"	Daina Reid	Jane Bodie	27 January 2005
72	6	"The Crisis of Questions"	Daina Reid	James Hawthorne & Hamish Wright	3 February 2005
73	7	"Rocks and Chameleons"	Ray Quint	Jaime Browne	17 February 2005
74	8	"Gathering of Tribes"	Ray Quint	Kris Mrksa	24 February 2005
75	9	"Facing It"	Brendan Maher	Tony McNamara	3 March 2005
76	10	"When the Bell Rings"	Brendan Maher	Jane Allen	10 March 2005
77	11	"Insecurity Blanket"	Stuart McDonald	Fiona Wood	17 March 2005
78	12	"The Heart of Friday Night"	Stuart McDonald	Michael Miller	24 March 2005
79	13	"The Big Leap"	Emma Freeman	Chris Corbett	9 November 2005
80	14	"Spitting the Dummy"	Emma Freeman	Liz Doran	16 November 2005
81	15	"The Treadmill"	Matthew Saville	Ellie Beaumont	23 November 2005
82	16	"The Character Question"	Matthew Saville	Tony McNamara	30 November 2005
83	17	"Dead Man Walking"	Daniel Nettheim	Michael Miller	7 December 2005
84	18	"Ill Communication"	Daniel Nettheim	Jaime Browne & Kris Mrksa	14 December 2005
85	19	"Rare Birds"	Adrian Holmes	Ellie Beaumont	21 December 2005
86	20	"Glimpses of Perfection"	Adrian Holmes	Tony McNamara	28 December 2005
