= Paper Giants: Magazine Wars =

- Written by: Justin Monjo (part 1&2); Keith Thompson (part 1)
- Directed by: Daina Reid
- Starring: Rachel Griffiths; Rob Carlton; Mandy McElhinney; William Zappa
- Country of origin: Australia
- No. of episodes: 2

Production
- Running time: 180 minutes
- Production company: Southern Star Group

Original release
- Network: ABC1
- Release: 2 June – 9 June 2013

Paper Giants: Magazine Wars is a 2013 Australian two-part television miniseries about "golden years" of the glossy women's magazines and the battle to have the number one selling publication in Australia. The mini series is a sequel to the 2011 mini series Paper Giants: The Birth of Cleo.

== Plot ==
Paper Giants: Magazine Wars is the story of the battle between Nene King (Mandy McElhinney) editor of Woman's Day and Dulcie Boling (Rachel Griffiths) editor of New Idea, from the rival Packer and Murdoch empires, who "battled" to make their publication the number one seller in Australia. It charts the period from 1987 to 1997 with the rise of cheque-book journalism, the age of celebrity power, paparazzi, media moguls and the two remarkable women who helped make them.

== Critical reception ==
Occasional writer for The Guardian Doug Anderson reported that the miniseries was an "absorbing and frequently rewarding drama".

== Cast ==
- Rachel Griffiths as Dulcie Boling
- Mandy McElhinney as Nene King
- Rob Carlton as Kerry Packer
- Angus Sampson as Patrick Bowring
- Khan Chittenden as Nick Trumpet
- Caren Pistorius as Beth Ridgeway
- Lucy Bell as Susan Duncan
- Mark Lee as Richard Walsh
- Socratis Otto as Peter Dawson
- William Zappa as Rupert Murdoch
- Alexander England as James Packer
- John Wood as Ken Cowley
- Steve Rodgers as Alan Bond
- Sean Taylor as Al Dunlap
- Rodger Corser as Harry M. Miller
- Rhys McConnochie as Lionel King
- Elspeth Ballantyne as Emily King
- Samuel Johnson as Paul Cavanagh
- Nicki Paull as Maggie Tabberer
- Danielle Carter as Julia
- Penne Hackforth-Jones as Camilla Parker-Bowles (voice)
