= David Tredinnick =

David Tredinnick may refer to:

- David Tredinnick (politician) (born 1950), British politician
- David Tredinnick (actor), Australian actor
