= Ann Burbrook =

Australian actress

- Born: 23 November 1965 (age 60); Jesselton, Sabah, Malaysia
- Other name: Annie Burbrook
- Occupation: Actress

Ann Burbrook, sometimes credited as Annie Burbrook, (born 23 November 1965 in Jesselton, Sabah, Malaysia), is an Australian actress.

== Early life ==
Burbrook trained at the Australian Ballet School and the WA Academy of Performing Arts before dancing with a number of ballet companies in Australia. In 1986, she moved to Brisbane to dance with the Queensland Ballet.

After her ballet career was cut short, she made the transition from dancing to acting through an association with La Boite Theatre in Brisbane. During her three-year association with that theatre, she performed in a number of plays as well as becoming a Theatresports player, convener and tutor.

Burbrook graduated from Australia's National Institute of Dramatic Art (NIDA) with a degree in Performing Arts (Acting) in 1992 which she upgraded to a BA Arts in 1997 after successful completion of the NIDA Playwrights Course.

== Career ==
Despite a large number of theatre, film and television roles, Burbrook would be most recognised for her major role as Roz Patterson, on Blue Heelers on which she appeared in 1994. Other shows she has played in include Police Rescue, Good Guys, Bad Guys, Sun on the Stubble and Snobs

On stage she starred as Stephanie Abrahams in Duet for One (Ensemble Theatre, 1998), as Amy in Amy's View (Sydney Opera House, 1998) as Hypatia and young Frances in Leaning Towards Infinity (Ensemble Theatre, 1999), and played in Craving (Sydney St. Theatre Space, 1993) for which she was also the choreographer. She played in the 1992 NIDA graduating performance of Images de Moliere at the Parade Theatre.

She continues to work as an actor and voice over artist whilst using her administrative skills in positions such as artistic coordinator, general manager and festival director for a number of arts organisations.

She became the company manager of Illawarra's Theatre South in 2002 and the director of Viva La Gong festival in 2005.

== Filmography ==
=== Film ===
Year	Title	Role	Notes
1997	The Hostages	Louise	TV film
1999	Secret Men's Business	Bec	TV film
2000	Me Myself I	Janine	Film
2010	The Invitation	Felicity	Short film
2011	Focus	Female	Short film
2014	Tell Me How You See The Sky	Freddie	Short film

=== Television ===
Year	Title	Role	Notes
1993	Police Rescue	Ms. Fay	Episode: "Speeding"
1994	Wedlocked	Faith	Episode: "War Cry"
1994-1996	Blue Heelers	Roz Patterson	31 episodes
1995	Law of the Land	Debbie Goodman	Episode: "Glory Road"
1996	Snowy River: The McGregor Saga	Mrs. Carter	Episode: "The Cutting Edge"
1996	Mercury	Sue Kinsella	2 episodes
1996	Sun on the Stubble	Miss Knightley	Episode: "Adventures in Paradise"
1997	Good Guys, Bad Guys	Angela Slater	Episode: "Unfinished Business"
1997	State Coroner	Michelle Evans	Episode: "Coming to Grief"
1998	Murder Call	Celia Stemitt	Season 2, Episode 18: "Instrument of Death"
1999	Home and Away	Mara Taylor	2 episodes
1999-2008	All Saints	Carol Sherwood/Linda Glass	Episode: "Ghosts of Christmas Past", "Echoes"
2003	Snobs	Mrs. Church	13 episodes
2014	Love Child	Dorothy	Episode: "1.1, 1.2"
