= Dulcie Boling =

Australian businessman (born 1936)

- Born: 29 March 1936 (age 90)
- Occupation: Businessman

Dulcie Boling (born Elizabeth Dulcie Boling on 29 March 1936) is an Australian businessperson and magazine editor. She was born in Kyabram, Victoria in Australia. She was editor of New Idea magazine from 1977 to 1993. Boling was a senior executive of Southdown Press, which later became Pacific Magazines. She served as the chairperson and executive chairman of Southdown Press and Chief Executive Magazines of PMP Limited from 1992 to 1993.

Australian actor Rachel Griffiths played Boling in the Australian Broadcasting Corporation television mini-series Paper Giants: Magazine Wars, a sequel to Paper Giants: The Birth of Cleo.
