= Men with Guns (disambiguation) =

Men with Guns is a 1997 American drama film written and directed by John Sayles.

Men with Guns can also refer to:

- Men with Guns (1997 Canadian film), a drama directed by Kari Skogland
- "Men with Guns", an episode of the television series The Virginian
