= Nene King =

Australian journalist

- Born: March 1943 (age 83); Melbourne, Victoria, Australia
- Occupations: Magazine (as former editor) The Australian Women's Weekly, Women's Day, New Idea)
- Known for: Magazines

Nene Claire King is an Australian journalist. She is the former editor of some of Australia's women's magazines, including Woman's Day, New Idea and Women's Weekly.

== Early life ==
Nene Claire King was born in March 1943 in Melbourne to a Jewish family. Her parents were Lionel Louvain King (died 1996) and Emilie Rebecca Myers (1916–2008) and she has an older brother, Peter (Snowy). She was educated in Melbourne at Methodist Ladies' College.

== Addiction ==
On the edition of 12 June 2007 of Today Tonight on Australia's Channel 7, King revealed she is addicted to prescription medication and has recently been to rehab to cure addictions to illicit drugs.

== Personal life ==
King has one sibling, her older brother, Peter.

Peter FitzSimons wrote King's biography Nene King in 2002. King wrote her autobiography, entitled Nene.

In February 2010, King claimed she was facing ruin after a disastrous falling out with associates was set to cost her more than $1 million. The matter went before Melbourne's County Court in February 2016. On 12 February 2016, an associate was found not guilty of defrauding King.

King has been married three times. In 1993, she married her third husband, Patrick Bowring, a rock journalist and diver. Bowring disappeared while wreck diving in May 1996, a month after King's father Lionel also died. Her mother Emily died in April 2008. King has admitted to using alcohol to "bury" her problems. She also admits to having smoked marijuana.

The former editor of Woman's Day and The Australian Women's Weekly magazines, told The Sunday Telegraph that she faced losing her home to pay her debts. She currently lives in Ballarat, Victoria, and writes a weekly agony aunt column for New Idea.

In June 2013, Australian actor Mandy McElhinney played King in the Australian Broadcasting Corporation television mini-series Paper Giants: Magazine Wars, a sequel to Paper Giants: The Birth of Cleo.
