= Gallipoli (miniseries) =

- Title card
- Genre: Drama
- Written by: Christopher David Lee
- Directed by: Glendyn Ivin
- Country of origin: Australia
- Original language: English
- No. of series: 1
- No. of episodes: 7

Production
- Producers: John Edwards; Robert Connolly
- Running time: 46 mins
- Production company: Endemol Australia

Original release
- Network: Nine Network
- Release: 9 February – 9 March 2015

Gallipoli is a seven-part Australian television drama miniseries that was telecast on the Nine Network from 9 February 2015, the 100th anniversary of the Gallipoli Campaign. It is adapted from the best-selling book Gallipoli by Les Carlyon, and produced by Endemol Australia.

== Premise ==
The seven-part series centers on 17-year-old Thomas "Tolly" Johnson (Kodi Smit-McPhee), who lies about his age so he may enlist with his brother Bevan (Harry Greenwood) and ends up fighting at Gallipoli in the campaign that helped create the ANZAC legend.

The story depicts the ten-month campaign in Turkey, highlighting the landing on 25 April 1915 by ANZAC troops who go into battle on the Gallipoli Peninsula. Landing in the dark, Tolly, Bevan, and their fellow soldiers of Australia's 4th Battalion endeavor to establish a defensible foothold beneath the treacherous slopes of the peninsula. The series follows both the battle and its aftermath.

The soldiers spend eight months learning combat skills while trying to survive in the most difficult of circumstances. By the time of their final evacuation they have learnt much about themselves and their mates.

== Cast ==
- Kodi Smit-McPhee as Thomas 'Tolly' Johnson
- Harry Greenwood as Bevan Johnson
- Sam Parsonson as Dave Klein
- Tom Budge as Cliff Sutton
- James Callis as Ellis Ashmead-Bartlett
- John Bach as General Sir Ian Hamilton
- Nicholas Hope as Major General Walter Braithwaite
- Paul English as Colonel Cecil Faber Aspinall-Oglander
- Anthony Hayes as Anthony Chandler
- Matt Nable as Sergeant Harry Perceval
- Leon Ford as Charles Bean
- Ashleigh Cummings as Celia Houghton
- Justine Clarke as Noah Johnson
- Lincoln Lewis as Chook Dutton
- James Stewart as Billy Sing
- Dion Williams as Two-Bob King
- Gracie Gilbert as Staff Nurse Tessa
- Andy McPhee as Lieutenant Colonel John Antill
- Alex Tsitsopoulos as Mehmet Ozkan
- Anthony Phelan as Lieutenant General Sir William Birdwood
- David Whiteley as Brigadier General Cyril Brudenell White
- John Fillingham as Major General Sir Alexander Godley
- Travis Jeffery as Henry 'Stewie' Stewart Watson
- Grant Bowler as Lieutenant Colonel William Malone
- Lachy Hulme as Lord Kitchener
- Jeremy Lindsay Taylor as Captain Eric Taylor
- Yalin Ozucelik as Mustafa Kemal Atatürk
- Damon Gameau as Keith Murdoch
- Nicholas Hammond as Henry Nevinson
- Brendon Nolan as Darryl 'Doon' Lincoln
- Jacob Collins-Levy as Young ANZAC
- John Brumpton as Sergeant Major

== Episodes ==
No.	Title	Directed by	Written by	Original release date	Aus. viewers (millions)
1	"The First Day"	Glendyn Ivin	Christopher Lee	9 February 2015	1.10
As dawn breaks on 25 April 1915, 17-year-old Thomas "Tolly" Johnson lands with the ANZAC troops at Gallipoli and finds himself in a chaotic, brutal battle for the Turkish heights.
2	"My Friend, the Enemy"	Glendyn Ivin	Christopher Lee	16 February 2015	0.58
After a month of heavy fighting, the ANZAC and Turkish soldiers meet in no man's land during a cease fire, to bury their dead. Tolly risks his life by charging a machine gun nest to protect his brother.
3	"A Man Alone"	Glendyn Ivin	Christopher Lee	23 February 2015	0.53
For his bravery, Tolly is promoted ahead of his older brother to lance corporal, but disaster strikes when their platoon launches a surprise midnight attack and Tolly is shot.
4	"The Deeper Scar"	Glendyn Ivin	Christopher Lee	2 March 2015	0.48
Tolly recovers from his injuries in an Australian hospital in Cairo and reluctantly returns to the front line at Gallipoli.
5	"The Breakout"	Glendyn Ivin	Christopher Lee	2 March 2015	0.37
In August 1915, General Hamilton devises a massive attack across the Gallipoli Peninsula to break the stalemate. Tolly and his mates defy the odds to win the Battle of Lone Pine, while the Light Horseman are decimated at The Nek.
6	"If Only..."	Glendyn Ivin	Christopher Lee	9 March 2015	0.45
Australian journalist Keith Murdoch visits the peninsula then writes a letter that will change the course of the campaign. Tolly is commended for his bravery at Lone Pine, and promoted to corporal, while Dave refuses to get help for chronic illness.
7	"The Earth Abides"	Glendyn Ivin	Christopher Lee	9 March 2015	0.35
British commanders quickly withdraw troops before the arrival of the German howitzers moving towards the front line. As tens of thousands army troops secretly evacuate from Gallipoli, Tolly stays behind, guarding the emptying trenches.

== Production ==
The series is adapted from the best-selling book Gallipoli by Les Carlyon.

Gallipoli was produced by Endemol Australia and was shot over a three-month period commencing on 17 March 2014. Cast members undertook some military training in Melbourne before filming began. Filming took place in Melbourne and surrounding areas, including Bacchus Marsh and Werribee. The 25 April 1915 landing was recreated on the Mornington Peninsula.

John Edwards and Robert Connolly were the producers; the Nine Network's co-heads of drama, Jo Rooney and Andy Ryan, along with Endemol Australia CEO Janeen Faithfull were the executive producers. The series was directed by Glendyn Ivin, and the scriptwriter was Christopher Lee. The production employed around 750 local people and was expected to generate an estimated $14.6 million in production expenditure, with Film Victoria providing significant financing for the project through its Production Incentive Attraction Fund (PIAF).

Gallipoli is distributed internationally by Endemol Worldwide Distribution.

== Release ==
The series premiered on 9 February 2015 on the Nine Network, and concluded four weeks later. All seven episodes of Gallipoli were made available on the streaming service Stan during the television premiere, as part of a promotion deal.

== Reception ==
The series was a ratings disaster, described by David Gyngell, head of Nine Entertainment at the time, as the network's "biggest disappointment". Despite being launched as a flagship program for the network in 2015, Gallipoli lost half of its audience between the first and second episodes, down from 1.1 million to 580,000. In response, the network reduced the series' schedule from seven weeks' broadcast to five weeks, with episodes 4 & 5 and 6 & 7 airing back-to-back. Ratings continued to fall.

It currently has a 7.9/10 rating on IMDb.

== See also ==
- Deadline Gallipoli
