= Four Jacks =

Four Jacks may refer to:

- Four Jacks (film), a 2001 Australian action film
- Four Jacks (quartet), a Danish vocal quartet, founded in 1956
