= Howzat! Kerry Packer's War =

2012 film

- DVD cover
- Genre: Drama; Miniseries
- Written by: Christopher Lee
- Directed by: Daina Reid
- Starring: Lachy Hulme; Matthew Le Nevez; Brendan Cowell; Damon Gameau; Abe Forsythe; Cariba Heine
- Country of origin: Australia
- Original language: English
- No. of episodes: 2

Production
- Executive producers: Jo Rooney; Rory Callaghan
- Producers: Mimi Butler; John Edwards
- Running time: 90 minutes
- Production company: Southern Star Entertainment

Original release
- Network: Nine Network
- Release: 19 August – 26 August 2012

Howzat! Kerry Packer's War is an Australian drama-miniseries set in the 1970s that premiered on the Nine Network on Sunday 19 August 2012.

== Plot ==
The Ashes is the pinnacle of world cricket with two old enemies, Australia and England, going head to head. This series is the story of World Series Cricket and its creator, Australian media mogul Kerry Packer, who signed up the world's greatest players and set up a parallel cricket competition.

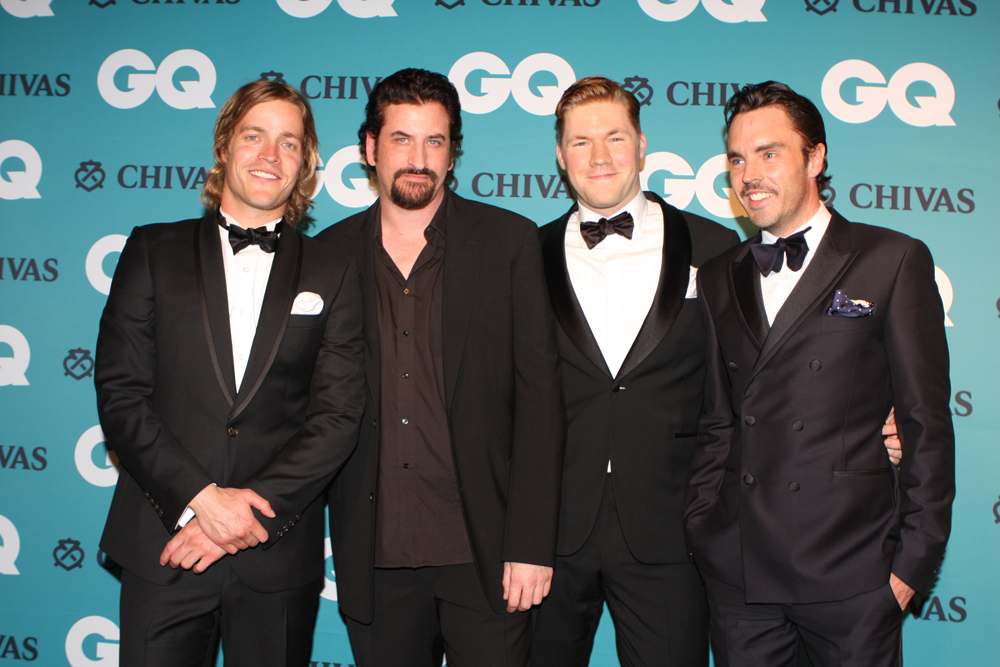
Left to right: Richard Davies, Lachy Hulme, Alexander England and Damon Gameau promoting Howzat! Kerry Packer's War at GQ Australia Men of The Year Awards 2012

- Lachy Hulme as Kerry Packer
- Travis McMahon as Paul Hogan
- Abe Forsythe as John Cornell
- Cariba Heine as Delvene Delaney
- Peter Houghton as Richie Benaud
- Clayton Watson as Ian Chappell
- Damon Gameau as Greg Chappell
- Matthew Le Nevez as Dennis Lillee
- Ryan O'Kane as Jeff Thomson
- Brendan Cowell as Rod Marsh
- Richard Davies as David Hookes
- Nicholas Coghlan as Austin Robertson Jr.
- Alexander England as Tony Greig
- Andrew Carbone as Max Walker
- Russell Newman as Harry Chester
- Tony Briggs as Clive Lloyd
- Daniel Worrall as Mick Malone
- Craig Hall as Gavin Warner
- Mandy McElhinney as Rose
- Nicholas Bell as Clive Bell
- Brett Cousins as Alan "Mo" Morris
- Angus Sampson as Alan "Jo"Johnston
- Paul Denny as Bruce Francis
- Eliza Taylor as Rhonda
- Diane Craig as well-dressed woman at SCG

== Ratings ==
No.	Title	Air date	Overnight ratings		Consolidated ratings		Total viewers	Ref(s)
No.	Title	Air date	Viewers	Rank	Viewers	Rank	Total viewers	Ref(s)
1	Part One	19 August 2012	2,097,000	1	277,000	1	2,374,000	
2	Part Two	26 August 2012	2,091,000	1	253,000	1	2,344,000	

== Accolades ==
Year	Award	Category	Nominee	Result	Ref
2013	Logie Awards	Most Outstanding Miniseries or Telemovie		Won	
2013	Logie Awards	Most Popular Miniseries or Telemovie		Won	
2013	Logie Awards	Most Outstanding Actor	Lachy Hulme	Nominated	
2013	Logie Awards	Most Popular Actor	Lachy Hulme	Nominated	
2013	Logie Awards	Most Outstanding Actress	Mandy McElhinney	Nominated	
2013	AACTA Awards	Best Telefeature, Mini Series or Short Run Series		Won	
2013	AACTA Awards	Best Direction	Daina Reid (for "Part 1")	Nominated	
2013	AACTA Awards	Best Lead Actor	Lachy Hulme	Nominated	
2013	AACTA Awards	Best Guest or Supporting Actor	Abe Forsythe	Nominated	
2013	AACTA Awards	Best Guest or Supporting Actress	Mandy McElhinney	Won	
2013	Australian Directors' Guild Awards	Best Direction in TV Mini Series	Daina Reid	Nominated	
2013	Equity Awards	Most Outstanding Performance by an Ensemble in a Television Movie or Miniseries	Cast	Nominated	

== Book ==
Howzat! Kerry Packer's War, is also a book by Christopher Lee, who wrote the screenplay of the TV series. It was first published in 2012 by New South Publishing, an imprint of The University of New South Wales.

== See also ==
- World Series Cricket
- Cricket World Cup
- Limited overs cricket
- South African rebel tours
- Power Games: The Packer-Murdoch War
