= Christopher David Lee =

Australian scriptwriter (born 1947)

Christopher David Lee (born 28 March 1947) is an Australian scriptwriter who has been an Australian Associated Press journalist and foreign correspondent and has worked as a script consultant in New Zealand, Singapore and New York City. He has won an AFI Award and four AWGIE Awards and is the recipient of a Centenary Medal and a Queensland Premier's Literary Award.

== Early life ==
Lee is the son of a country doctor and grew up in western New South Wales. He attended Newington College (1962–1964) as a boarder and studied at Sydney University (BA) and the Australian Film Television and Radio School.

== Screenwriting ==
He was the creator and writer of the ABC drama series Stringer, head writer and then script executive of the ABC-BBC drama series Police Rescue. He wrote four of the six Cody telemovies, and was co-creator and head writer of Big Sky. He was an originating writer (with Judi McCrossin) of The Secret Life of Us and co-creator and Head Writer of the short-lived soap opera Echo Point. He is the co-creator of the television series Rush. He wrote the SBS teleplay That Man's Father, co-wrote the telemovie, Secret Men's Business (with Nicholas Hammond) and wrote the 4-hour mini-series Do or Die. Most recently, Lee has been the writer of the 2011 mini-series Paper Giants: The Birth of Cleo and the 2012 mini-series Howzat! Kerry Packer's War and the 8-hour mini-series "Gallipoli".

== Publishing ==
He is a short story writer, author of the novel Bush Week published by Angus & Robertson and writer of the book Howzat! Kerry Packer's War, published by University of New South Wales Press. In 2015, his novel Seasons of War was published by Penguin Australia.

== Lecturer ==
Lee has lectured in screenwriting at the University of Canberra, the National Institute of Dramatic Art, and the Australian Film Television and Radio School.

== Awards ==
His hour of Bodysurfer won an AFI Award, and he is a four-time AWGIE Award winner: for the documentary Saturday, Saturday; the mini-series Do or Die; the telemovie pilot for The Secret Life of Us; and for an episode of Rush which he co-created and produced the script for. Lee was awarded the Centenary Medal for his contribution to Australian television and won a Queensland Premier's Literary Award in 2011.
