= Lachy Hulme =

Australian actor and screenwriter (born 1971)

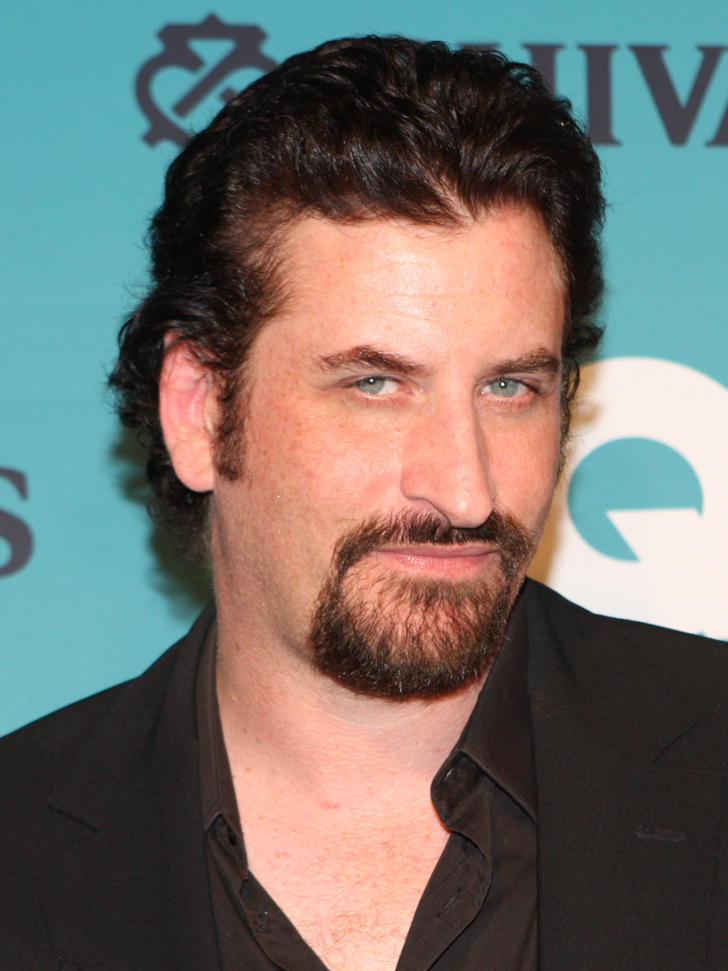
- Hulme in 2012
- Born: 1 April 1971 (age 55); Melbourne, Victoria, Australia
- Occupations: Actor, screenwriter
- Years active: 1992–present
- Website: Official Twitter

Lachy Hulme (born 1 April 1971) is an Australian actor and screenwriter. He has written several films and has appeared in a number of Australian and US film and television productions. His roles have included CIA Agent Robert Wheeler in The Crocodile Hunter: Collision Course, Sparks in The Matrix Reloaded and The Matrix Revolutions, and Immortan Joe and Rizzdale Pell in Furiosa: A Mad Max Saga.

== Early life ==
Hulme was born in Melbourne, Victoria where he has lived most of his life. Hulme completed his secondary-schooling at Melbourne's Wesley College, graduating with honours in drama, appearing in school theatrical productions such as South Pacific and Rover in 1988. His early career included appearances in theatre productions Rinaldo 441 and Sexual Perversity in Chicago and roles in Australian TV series Blue Heelers, Stingers and White Collar Blue.

== Career ==
Hulme's first film role was starring in the Australian 1994 thriller The Intruder, directed by Richard Wolstencroft but the film was not released due to the sudden closure of the production company Boulevard Films (it was belatedly released on DVD in 2005). In 1997, Hulme wrote the screenplay for the Canadian action-thriller Men with Guns directed by Kari Skogland (not to be confused with the similarly titled US film directed by John Sayles that was released the same year).

In 2000, Hulme appeared in the Australian thriller Four Jacks, directed by Matthew George. Hulme received the prize for best actor at that year's Melbourne Underground Film Awards.

In 2001 Hulme re-teamed with George when the latter directed the controversial film comedy Let's Get Skase which Hulme both co-wrote and starred in. The film's premise was inspired by the real-life comedy event staged by Andrew Denton back in the 1990s on his late-night show Denton in which he had staged a telethon called Chase for Skase to raise funds to hire a kidnapper to bring fugitive businessman Christopher Skase back to Australia from Spain where he had moved following the collapse of his business empire in 1991. The film was a satirical comedy in which Hulme played the leader of a rag-tag gang of hired kidnappers who plan to break into Skase's Spanish mansion and smuggle him back to Australia to face his creditors. Unexpectedly, the real-life Skase died in Mallorca in August 2001 whilst the film was in post-production, causing some criticism of the timing of the film's release shortly afterwards.

In 2003, Hulme scored roles in the sequels to the smash-hit science-fiction film The Matrix. He played the role of Sparks, one of the free-born crew members of one of the hover-ships in the films The Matrix Reloaded and The Matrix Revolutions, both films shot in Sydney. He also reprised the role for the Enter the Matrix video games. He wrote an introduction to the 2003 edition of Dick Russell's 1992 book The Man Who Knew Too Much about Richard Case Nagell.

During preparations to film The Dark Knight (2008), the sequel to Batman Begins (2005), it was reported that Hulme was being considered for the role of the Joker. Ultimately, the role went to fellow Australian actor Heath Ledger. Hulme later said that he had never been in the shortlist for the role; he had never even met the film's director, Christopher Nolan, despite media reports to the contrary.

In 2006, Hulme played the role of MacDuff, alongside Sam Worthington in Geoffrey Wright's adaptation of William Shakespeare play Macbeth, in which the play was set amongst Melbourne's criminal underworld. Although the film received mixed reviews and fared poorly at the box office, Hulme's performance received considerable praise. That same year, Hulme played a brash, foul-mouthed record company executive in the Australian film comedy BoyTown directed by Kevin Carlin and reprised the role in the unreleased spin-off mockumentary BoyTown Confidential directed by Tony Martin.

In 2008, Hulme appeared in the Australian TV comedy series The Hollowmen, produced by Working Dog Productions. Over the next two years, Hulme appeared in episodes of the TV comedies Chandon Pictures and The Librarians as well as the police drama Rush. In 2010, Hulme became a regular cast member on the drama series Offspring, playing the role of the brilliant but eccentric Dr. Martin Clegg in seven seasons.

Hulme has continued to also work in theatre, appearing in the Sydney Theatre Company's 2009 production of the comedy-drama play Elling, based on an original Norwegian film and novel and directed for the stage by Pamela Rabe, a performance for which Hulme received good reviews.

He returned to the big screen in 2011, appearing as a rogue SAS soldier in the action-thriller The Killer Elite, directed by Gary McKendry. The film, an Australian–US co-production and partially filmed in Victoria, starred Robert De Niro, Jason Statham and Clive Owen.

In 2012, Hulme starred in the television film Beaconsfield, a dramatized depiction of the Beaconsfield Mine Collapse in Tasmania, 2006 where one miner was killed in a sudden cave-in and two others, Todd Russell and Brant Webb, were trapped for 14 days, prompting a large-scale rescue operation which drew in nationwide media coverage. Hulme starred as Russell, deliberately gaining weight in order to play the burly miner, alongside Shane Jacobson who played Webb.

He had a well received supporting role in the 2012 Australian comedy Any Questions for Ben?, created by Working Dog Productions. In addition to Beasconsfield, Hulme starred in the title role in another film, Howzat! Kerry Packer's War. Hulme, having lost most of the weight he gained in 2011 for the filming of Beaconsfield (for the sake of his other acting commitments with the Fundamental Amish Theatre Company of Frankston), was again obliged to regain more girth to play the role of the heavy-set famous businessman. The role earned Hulme considerable praise and the film was a ratings hit.

In 2012, Hulme also appeared in the comedy film Scumbus, written and produced by, and starring, Ed Kavalee, the film airing in November. Hulme has also appeared in Kavalee's next feature, the comedy-satire Border Protection Squad, which has been completed but is awaiting a distributor.

In 2013, Hulme starred in the prequel to Howzat!, a miniseries called Power Games: The Packer-Murdoch War. Hulme played the role of another member of the Packer dynasty, Sir Frank. The miniseries aired in September and Hulme received good reviews, one critic praising his "forceful performance" although ratings were disappointing.

In March 2014, Hulme was cast in the Nine Network's eight-part 2015 drama series, Gallipoli and in which he played Lord Kitchener.

In 2024, Hulme appeared as Immortan Joe (replacing the late Hugh Keays-Byrne) and Rizzdale Pell in Furiosa: A Mad Max Saga, the fifth film in the Mad Max franchise and a spin-off/prequel to 2015's Mad Max: Fury Road.

On 16 October 2025, Hulme was announced as Ebenezer Scrooge for the 2025 season of A Christmas Carol.

== Filmography ==
=== Films ===
Year	Title	Role	Notes	Ref.
1994	The Intruder	Intruder	DVD	
1997	Men with Guns	—N/a	Writer	
2001	Four Jacks	Carl Porter		
2001	Let's Get Skase	Peter Dellasandro	Also writer	
2002	The Crocodile Hunter: Collision Course	Robert Wheeler		
2003	The Matrix Reloaded	Sparks		
2003	The Matrix Revolutions	Sparks		
2006	Macbeth	Macduff		
2006	BoyTown	Marty Boomstein		
2011	Killer Elite	Steven Harris		
2012	Any Questions for Ben?	Sam		
2012	Scumbus	Adam Yeardley		
2012	John Doe: Vigilante	Ken Rutherford		
2014	The Little Death	Kim		
2015	Border Protection Squad	Dennis		
2022	Three Thousand Years of Longing	Sultan Suleiman		
2023	Teach Me How to Cry	Graeme McRae	Short film	
2024	Furiosa: A Mad Max Saga	Immortan Joe/ Rizzdale Pell		

=== Television ===
Year	Title	Role	Notes	Ref.
1992	Acropolis Now	—N/a	Writer; Episode: "The Lars Supper"	
1997	Raw FM	Ruthy	Episode: "In Arcadia"	
1998	Blue Heelers	Joe Fantini	2 episodes	
1999	Stingers	Graeme Wilkins	Episode: "Signal One"	
2002	White Collar Blue	Frank Conti	2 episodes	
2008	The Hollowmen	David 'Murph' Murphy	12 episodes	
2009	Chandon Pictures	Derek	Episode: "A Script Is Written"	
2009	Rush	Jacob White	Episode #2.5	
2010	The Librarians	Hasan	2 episodes	
2010–2017	Offspring	Dr. Martin Clegg	69 episodes	
2012	Beaconsfield	Todd Russell	TV film	
2012	Howzat! Kerry Packer's War	Kerry Packer	TV miniseries	
2012	Jack Irish: Black Tide	Dean Canetti	TV film	
2013	Power Games: The Packer-Murdoch War	Frank Packer	Miniseries	
2014	It's a Date	Rory	Episode: "How Much Research Should; You Do Before Dating?"	
2015	Gallipoli	Herbert Kitchener, 1st Earl Kitchener	3 episodes	
2015	The Secret River	Thomas Blackwood	2 episodes	
2015	The Ex-PM	Lachy Hulme	Episode: "Immortality"	
2016	The Caravan	Martin Clegg	7 episodes	
2018	Romper Stomper	Blake Farron	6 episodes	
2019	Preacher	Frankie Toscani	4 episodes	

=== Theatre ===
Year	Title	Role	Company	Notes	Ref.
2014	The Speechmaker		Melbourne Theatre Company	Working Dog Productions	
2016	Speed-the-Plow		Sydney Theatre Company	Rosyln Packer Theatre, Walsh Bay Sydney	
2025	A Christmas Carol	Ebenezer Scrooge	Melbourne Comedy Theatre		

=== Video games ===
Year	Title	Credit	Role	Notes	Ref.
2003	Enter the Matrix		Sparks	Voice role, motion capture performance and live-action full motion video	
2005	The Matrix: Path of Neo		Sparks	In-game footage only	

=== Voice work ===
Year	Title	Credit	Role	Notes	Ref.
2012–present	Fox Footy and Fox Sports		Broadcast announcer		
