= House of Hancock =

Australian television series

- Genre: Drama
- Written by: Paul Bennett; Katherine Thomson
- Directed by: Mark Joffe
- Starring: Mandy McElhinney; Peta Sergeant; Sam Neill; Robert Coleby
- Composer: Michael Yezerski
- Country of origin: Australia
- Original language: English
- No. of episodes: 2

Production
- Executive producers: Nick Murray; Jo Rooney; Andy Ryan
- Producers: Claudia Karvan; Paul Bennett; Michael Cordell
- Production locations: Sydney, New South Wales, Australia; Perth, Western Australia, Australia
- Cinematography: Garry Phillips
- Editor: Mark Perry
- Production company: Cordell Jigsaw Productions

Original release
- Network: Nine Network
- Release: 8 February – 15 February 2015

House of Hancock is an Australian mini-series, part 1 aired on the Nine Network on 8 February 2015 and the 2nd part on 15 February.

== Plot ==
House of Hancock tells the fictionalised story of the Hancock dynasty and the bizarre love triangle that emerged amongst Lang, his daughter Gina, and his beautiful Filipina housekeeper Rose.

Lang and Gina are inseparable, the perfect team, and Gina is confident she will soon inherit the family business. But their relationship is rocked by a series of tumultuous events. First, Lang is furious when Gina marries a man old enough to be her father. Then Lang's beloved wife Hope dies. In an attempt to help her ailing father, Gina employs a new housekeeper to get him back on track, Rose Lacson from the Philippines, not realising this will be a decision that tears their family apart.

Lang is instantly smitten with Rose, who is 37 years younger than the iron ore magnate. Lang and Rose quickly marry and what follows is an increasingly bitter public feud lasting two decades: filled with forbidden love, murder accusations, drug charges, illegitimate children, court cases and epic betrayal, all played out in the media, and all for Gina to retain control over the staggering Hancock family fortune.

== Production ==
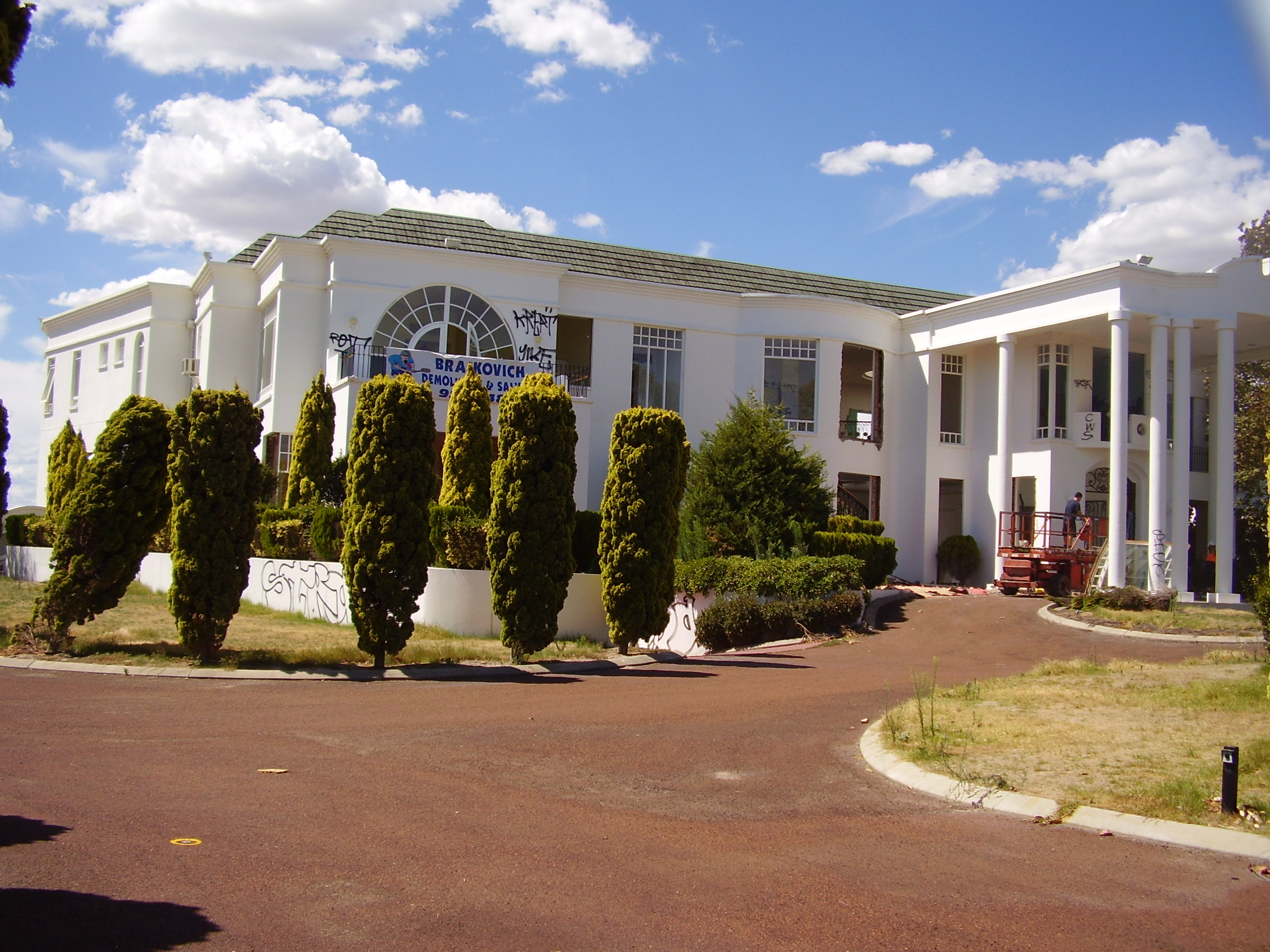
Prix d'Amour, a studio version features in the TV series

On 13 February 2013, it was confirmed that a series, titled Gina, consisting of four, one-hour telemovies based on the life of mining magnate, Gina Rinehart was commissioned in a joint venture between the Nine Network, Cordell Jigsaw Zapruder and Claudia Karvan's production company.

In November 2013, the Nine Network confirmed that the drama had been cut to half its original size and had a new name, presenting it as a two, one-hour telemovies, titled Gina v Rose: The House of Hancock.

On 13 August 2014, it was announced that Mandy McElhinney had won the titular role of Gina Rinehart, with news breaking four days later that Sam Neill and Peta Sergeant had signed on to play Lang Hancock and Rose Hancock Porteous, respectively.

The telemovie is produced by Michael Cordell, Claudia Karvan and Paul Bennett.

Filming for House of Hancock took place in Perth and Sydney, which began in August 2014 and wrapped six weeks later in early October 2014.

== Cast ==
- Mandy McElhinney as Gina Rinehart
- Sam Neill as Lang Hancock
- Peta Sergeant as Rose Hancock Porteous
- Robert Coleby as Frank Rinehart
- Leon Ford as Alan Camp
- Anne-Louise Lambert as Hope Hancock
- Jeremy Lindsay Taylor as Kevin Dalby
- Leah Purcell as Hilda Kickett
- Darcey Wilson as Young Gina
- Ben Winspear as Con Heliotis

== Reception ==
The first episode aired on 8 February 2015 at 8:45 on the Nine Network, against Ten's NCIS: New Orleans. The Telemovie is split into two parts shown over two Sundays.

No.	Title	Air date	Overnight ratings		Consolidated ratings		Total viewers	Ref(s)
No.	Title	Air date	Viewers	Rank	Viewers	Rank	Total viewers	Ref(s)
1	Part 1	8 February 2015	1,383,000	2	180,000	2	1,563,000	
2	Part 2	15 February 2015	1,380,000	2	304,000	1	1,684,000	

== Awards and nominations ==
2016	Logie Awards	Most Outstanding Miniseries or Telemovie	House of Hancock	Nominated
2016	Logie Awards	Most Outstanding Actress	Mandy McElhinney	Nominated

== Controversy ==
Controversy over House of Hancock being defamatory has been a worry of Gina Rinehart since it premiered on the Nine Network. Rinehart has accused the show of being incorrect. Since then, Gina Rinehart has taken legal action. On 24 February 2017 the Nine Network forced to release a carefully worded apology to Gina Rinehart for its inaccuracies and agreed not to release the TV series again on DVD, stream or sell it overseas.
