= Matthew George =

Australian film director

Matthew George is an Australian film director, producer and screenwriter. His films include Under the Gun, Four Jacks and Let's Get Skase, which was co-written with Lachy Hulme. His first film, Under the Gun, was written and directed by him at the age of 21, making him one of the youngest feature film directors in Australian cinema history.

George is a founder and partner of Acacia Entertainment, a finance and production company. Acacia Entertainment is a joint venture between the Tunica-Biloxi Tribal Economic Development Corporation, a wholly owned entity of the Tunica-Biloxi Tribe of Louisiana and Savvy Media Holdings, another finance and production company he formed.

He produced and financed the Lyndon B. Johnson biopic LBJ (2016), directed by Rob Reiner, and starring Woody Harrelson, Jennifer Jason Leigh, Richard Jenkins, Bill Pullman, Kim Allen, Michael Stahl-David, Jeffrey Donovan and Michael Mosley, based on the 2014 Black List-winning script by Joey Hartstone.

Following LBJ, he produced and financed the American thriller Wind River (2017) starring Jeremy Renner, Elizabeth Olsen, Gil Birmingham, Jon Bernthal, and written and directed by Taylor Sheridan. In 2016, George re-teamed with Harrelson and Reiner to produce and finance the film Shock and Awe (2017), which stars Woody Harrelson, James Marsden, Tommy Lee Jones, Jessica Biel and Milla Jovovich.

In 2018 George produced and financed the biopic entitled A Private War which details the life of the American born British War Journalist Marie Colvin. The film is directed by Matthew Heineman and stars Rosamund Pike, Jamie Dornan, Tom Hollander and Stanley Tucci. The film was released domestically by Aviron Pictures in November 2018.

George also produced and financed The Secret: Dare to Dream based on the best-selling self-help book written by Rhonda Byrne. The film was directed by Andy Tennant and stars Katie Holmes, Jerry O'Connell and Josh Lucas.

== Recent work ==
In addition to his previous productions, Matthew George's most recent credits include Albert Brooks: Defending My Life (2023), a documentary celebrating the life and career of actor and comedian Albert Brooks. Directed by Rob Reiner, the film received critical acclaim and was nominated for four Emmy Awards.

He is also credited as a producer on the highly anticipated sequel to the cult classic This Is Spinal Tap. Returning from the original are Harry Shearer, Michael McKean, Christopher Guest, and Rob Reiner, who will reprise his role as the documentarian Marty DiBergi. Several notable musicians are making cameo appearances as themselves, including Paul McCartney, Elton John, Garth Brooks, Questlove, Trisha Yearwood, and Lars Ulrich. Other cast members include John Michael Higgins, Chris Addison, Brad Williams, and Paul Shaffer.

== Filmography ==
- Under the Gun (1995, writer/director/executive producer)
- Four Jacks (2001, writer/director)
- Let's Get Skase (2001, writer/director)
- LBJ (2016, producer)
- Wind River (2017, producer)
- Shock and Awe (2017, producer)
- A Private War (2019, producer)
- The Secret: Dare to Dream (2020, producer)
- Wind River: The Next Chapter (producer)
- Albert Brooks: Defending My Life (producer)
- Spinal Tap II: The End Continues (2025, producer)
