= Let's Get Skase =

2001 film by Matthew George

- Directed by: Matthew George
- Written by: Matthew George; Lachy Hulme
- Produced by: Colin South; John Tatoulis
- Starring: Lachy Hulme; Alex Dimitriades; Craig McLachlan; Bill Kerr; Alex Menglet; Mike Salundi
- Cinematography: Justin Brickle
- Edited by: Michael Collins
- Music by: Craig Bryant
- Release date: 18 October 2001
- Country: Australia
- Language: English
- Budget: $3.5 million
- Box office: A$4,230,037 (Australia)

Let's Get Skase is a 2001 Australian comedy starring Lachy Hulme, Alex Dimitriades, Craig McLachlan, Alex Menglet, and Bill Kerr. It is based on the life of failed Australian businessman Christopher Skase, who after the collapse of his Qintex business fled to Mallorca, Spain. Skase died at around the time of the film's release. It was filmed in Melbourne and Perth.

== Plot ==
After the collapse of his massive Qintex business empire, Christopher Skase flees to the Spanish island of Mallorca, leaving angry creditors high and dry. Enter Peter Dellasandro, a fast-talking con man and failed entrepreneur who sees the "Chase For Skase" as a potential gold mine.Dellasandro convinces the Creditors Board that he's the only man with the ability and recklessness to undertake the task demanded by his country: the kidnapping of Christopher Skase.

But not everyone is convinced, especially Danny D'Amato, the fiery son of the Creditors Chairman. Suspicious of Dellasandro, the two form an uneasy alliance as Dellasandro sets out to recruit the ego-centric TV host Eric Carney into his scheme, until seasoned mercenary Mitch Vendieks warns Dellasandro that Carney is planning a kidnap plot of his own. Determined to beat Carney to the punch, Dellasandro and Danny join forces with Mitch to form their own team, recruiting the inept Sean Knight, mendacious getaway driver Dave Phibbs and cynical intelligence ace Rupert Wingate, who soon discovers that Skase is devising a deadly scheme to resurrect his business empire across Europe.

With time running out, Dellasandro and the boys head for Mallorca and track Skase to his sprawling mansion, confronting the devious businessman. The team is outnumbered by Skase's Security Guards and thus cannot manage to kidnap him. However, they make out with several computer discs which contain sensitive documents revealing Skase's plan to "bust out" Qintex. The information at hand is enough evidence for the Australian Government to make compensation payments to the Qintex Creditors Boardmembers.

== Cast ==
- Lachy Hulme as Peter Dellasandro
- Alex Dimitriades as Daniel "Danny" D'Amato Jr
- Craig McLachlan as Eric Carney
- Bill Kerr as Mitchell Vendieks
- Torquil Neilson as Sean Knight
- Nick Sheppard as Dave Phibbs
- Adam Haddrick as Rupert Wingate
- William Ten Eyck as Dick Rydell
- Vince D'Amico as Daniel D'Amato Sr.
- Vivienne Garrett as Ruth D'Amato
- Nick Atkinson as Anthony D'Amato
- Sarah Borg as Maris D'Amato
- George Shevtsov as Beneheim Bencini
- Gordon Honeycombe as Murray Bishop
- Helen Buday as Judith Turner
- Wayne Hassell as Christopher Skase
- Diane West as Pixie Skase
- Andrew Denton as himself (archive footage)

== Production ==
The film was based on a real-life proposal to abduct Christopher Skase but is mostly fictional. Skase died during post-production.

== See also ==
- Cinema of Australia
