= The Hostages (1997 film) =

- Directed by: Catherine Millar
- Written by: Peter Yeldham
- Produced by: Ray Alchin
- Starring: Sophie Lee; Jeremy Callaghan
- Cinematography: Geoff Burton
- Edited by: Michael Honey
- Release date: 1997
- Running time: 93 minutes
- Country: Australia
- Language: English

The Hostages is a 1997 Australian TV film shown on Channel Nine. It was the first of a group of three movies produced by JNP Productions and written by Peter Yeldham. It was inspired by two 1994 kidnapping incidents in Cambodia.

== Premise ==
Tourists are taken hostage by a group of Cambodian rebels.

== Cast ==
- Sophie Lee as Kate
- Ann Burbrook as Louise
- Jason Chong as Du Van Hoc
- Jeremy Callaghan as Steve
- Jennifer Jarman as Anne
- John Gregg as Masters
- Nick Pelomis as Pierre Marchand
- Linda Cropper as Wendy
- Russell Kiefel as Jim

== Production ==
The Hostages was partly shot in Sri Lanka.

== Reception ==
The Hostages was the highest rated show in its timeslot.

Robin Oliver in the Sydney Morning Herald calls it "Adequate — no more than that - undemanding and relenting in its fictional rewriting of two ghastly incidents in the recent history of Australians and their companions travelling overseas". Simon Hughes of The Age says "Not only does a telemovie such as The Hostages (Nine, 8.30pm) insult the viewer's intelligence, it does a disservice to those connected to the David Wilson case on which it is clearly based."
