= Beaconsfield (film) =

2012 Australian TV film

- Genre: Drama
- Based on: Beaconsfield Mine collapse
- Written by: Judi McCrossin
- Directed by: Glendyn Ivin
- Starring: Shane Jacobson; Lachy Hulme; Cameron Daddo; Anthony Hayes
- Country of origin: Australia
- Original language: English

Production
- Producers: Jane Liscombe; John Edwards
- Production company: Southern Star Group

Original release
- Network: Nine Network
- Release: 22 April 2012

Beaconsfield is an Australian television film produced for Nine Network. The film is a dramatisation of the 2006 Beaconsfield Mine collapse. It premiered on Nine Network on 22 April 2012.

The telemovie was filmed in Beaconsfield, Melbourne and Mansfield in Victoria. It was watched by 1.637 million viewers, came first in its timeslot and second of the night.

== Cast ==
- Shane Jacobson as Brant Webb
- Lachy Hulme as Todd Russell
- Cameron Daddo as Matthew Gill
- Anthony Hayes as Pat Ball
- Richard Davies as Daniel Piscioneri
- Angus Sampson as Brett 'Cress' Cresswell
- Sacha Horler as Rachel Webb
- Tessa James as Lauren Kielmann
- Peta Brady as Jacqui Knight
- Syd Brisbane as Gavin 'Cheesy' Cheeseman
- Eddie Baroo as Darren 'Geardy' Geard
