= Shock and Awe (film) =

- Theatrical release poster
- Directed by: Rob Reiner
- Written by: Joey Hartstone
- Produced by: Matthew George; Michele Singer Reiner; Rob Reiner
- Starring: Woody Harrelson; James Marsden; Rob Reiner; Jessica Biel; Milla Jovovich; Tommy Lee Jones
- Cinematography: Barry Markowitz
- Edited by: Bob Joyce
- Music by: Jeff Beal
- Production companies: Acacia Entertainment; Castle Rock Entertainment; Savvy Media Holdings; Voltage Pictures
- Distributed by: Vertical Entertainment; DirecTV Cinema
- Release dates: September 30, 2017 (Zurich); July 13, 2018 (United States)
- Running time: 90 minutes
- Country: United States
- Language: English
- Budget: $15.5 million
- Box office: $182,415

Shock and Awe is a 2017 American drama film starring and directed by Rob Reiner and written by Joey Hartstone. The film also stars Woody Harrelson, Tommy Lee Jones, James Marsden, Milla Jovovich, and Jessica Biel, and follows a group of journalists at Knight Ridder's Washington Bureau who investigate the rationale behind the Bush Administration's then-impending 2003 invasion of Iraq. The film had its world premiere at the Zurich Film Festival on September 30, 2017. It was released through DirecTV Cinema on June 14, 2018, before having a limited release in theaters on July 13, 2018, by Vertical Entertainment.

== Plot ==
The film opens with a paralyzed Iraq War veteran testifying before Congress about his injuries in the war. The film centers on Knight Ridder reporters Jonathan Landay and Warren Strobel along with Editor-in-Chief John Walcott and legendary war correspondent Joe Galloway as they investigate the U.S. government's claims of Iraq stockpiling weapons of mass destruction following the 9/11 attacks. While most news agencies accept the Bush Administration's rationale for military action against Saddam Hussein, the Knight Ridder team, at the insistence of Walcott and Galloway, uncovers mounting evidence suggesting the administration's motives may be deceptive and that such weapons do not exist. The story follows the reporters' pursuit of the truth amid a patriotic media landscape, highlighting their efforts to challenge the prevailing narrative. Throughout, the reporters navigate Washington and gather information from various insiders, often anonymously, to expose the controversy surrounding the Iraq war buildup.

== Cast ==
- Woody Harrelson as Jonathan Landay
- James Marsden as Warren Strobel
- Rob Reiner as John Walcott
- Jessica Biel as Lisa Mayr
- Milla Jovovich as Vlatka Landay
- Tommy Lee Jones as Joe Galloway
- Richard Schiff as The Usual
- Luke Tennie as Adam Green
- Kate Butler as Nancy Walcott
- Al Sapienza as Carl
- Jack Topalian as Ahmed Chalabi

== Production ==
On July 12, 2016, Woody Harrelson was set as one of the leads of the film, reteaming with Reiner after LBJ. On July 13, 2016, James Marsden was added as well. The film features an interview with Dick Cheney on Meet the Press.

=== Filming ===
Principal photography on the film began in Louisiana on October 5, 2016. In October 2016, Alec Baldwin left the cast, reportedly due to financial timing. In November 2016, filming also took place in Washington, D.C.

Walcott has said he believed the film to be essentially "word-for-word" accurate. At one point in the film, Walcott gives an inspiring speech to the newsroom, but the original script had a screenwriter's version. On the day of shooting, Strobel said to Reiner that he should use Walcott's original words; Reiner had Walcott write down his exact speech, and Reiner then performed and filmed the scene.

== Release ==
The film had its world premiere at the Zurich Film Festival on September 30, 2017. Shortly after, Vertical Entertainment and DirecTV Cinema acquired distribution rights to the film. The film was released through DirecTV on June 14, 2018, before beginning a limited release in 100 theaters on July 13, 2018.

== Reception ==
=== Box office ===
Shock and Awe was a box office bomb, grossing just $77,980 in the United States and Canada and $104,435 in other territories, for a worldwide total of $182,415, plus $2.6 million with home video sales. against a $16 million budget.

=== Critical response ===
On review aggregator Rotten Tomatoes, the film holds an approval rating of 28% based on 46 reviews, with an average rating of 4.70/10. The website's critical consensus reads, "Shock and Awe has a worthy story to tell and some fine actors trying to bring it to life; unfortunately, the end results are still as derivative as they are dramatically inert." On Metacritic, the film has a weighted average score of 47 out of 100, based on 18 critics, indicating "mixed or average reviews".

Writing for Rolling Stone, David Fear gave the film 2/5 stars, saying, "It's an important story to remember right now, assuming you can remember anything after being beaten over the head with talking points for 90 minutes. But at its best, Shock and Awe still feels like it strains to be Spotlight-lite and comes up lacking. The title is a misnomer." Kerry Lengel of The Arizona Republic gave the film 1.5 out of 5 stars, writing, "It's trite and mechanistic in its attempts to build pathos while also making its arguments, from the opening scene featuring a soldier paralyzed by an IED to the absolute low point, a date between Marsden's reporter and his pretty next-door neighbor, played by Jessica Biel."

Deborah Young of The Hollywood Reporter wrote, "The reporting team at Knight Ridder Newspapers has been called 'the only ones who got it right' about Saddam Hussein's non-existent weapons of mass destruction that sparked the 2003 Iraq war. Based on a true story, Rob Reiner's Shock and Awe gives much-deserved credit to their far-sighted (if generally unheeded) news coverage, but the message tends to melt into a paint-by-numbers screenplay that pushes too many genre buttons to be thoroughly exciting."
