= Jeremy Callaghan =

Australian actor

- Born: 22 July 1967 (age 59); Papua New Guinea
- Occupations: Actor, journalist
- Years active: 1990–2005

Jeremy Callaghan (born 22 July 1967) is an Australian actor whose portrayal of the cute and shy Constable Brian Morley on the popular TV drama Police Rescue ensured international attention. Callaghan is also well known for his guest appearances on Xena: Warrior Princess (portraying Palaemon and Pompey) and Young Hercules (portraying Pollux).

== Early life ==
Callaghan was born in Papua New Guinea to Australian parents. He grew up in Perth, Western Australia with his parents, brother and sister. He graduated from Murdoch University with a B.A. in theatre media and communications in 1987. In December 1991, he graduated from the Western Australian Academy of Performing Arts (WAAPA), and then moved to Sydney to find work.

== Career ==
Callaghan's big break came in 1992 with the role as Constable Brian Morley on Police Rescue (also starring Gary Sweet, Sonia Todd, Steve Bisley and Tammy MacIntosh). The character was introduced in the second series episode "Stakeout", and Callaghan stayed on the show until the end of the fourth series. In 1993, his work earned him an AFI Award nomination for "Best Actor in a Leading Role in a Television Drama" for the episode "Whirlwind", but the award went to Peter Phelps for the G.P. episode "Exposed". Callaghan also starred in the 1994 feature film Police Rescue: The Movie.

In 1996, Jeremy Callaghan played Detective Senior Constable Kevin Holloway in the first season of Water Rats (with Colin Friels and Catherine McClements). In 2002, he played Dave Gorman in the last season of Something in the Air.

Over the years, Callaghan has guest-starred on a host of other TV series, including Blue Heelers, Murder Call, G.P. in 1993 and 1996, SeaChange, The Lost World, BeastMaster, Holby City, MDA, Young Hercules, and Xena: Warrior Princess. On many of the shows, he appeared in more than one episode, sometimes portraying a recurring character, sometimes not.

Moreover, Jeremy Callaghan has starred in movies like Southern Cross (2001) and the critically acclaimed The Great Raid (2005) (alongside Benjamin Bratt and James Franco) as well as a few TV movies like Secret Men's Business, Halifax f.p: The Scorpion's Kiss, and The Munsters' Scary Little Christmas. He has also performed extensively in theatre, commercials, and in short films like Elvis Killed My Brother (1990) , Bits & Pieces (1996) and Larger Than Life (1997).

Since 2005, Callaghan has taken a hiatus from acting. As of 2016 he was living with photographer Gaelle Le Boulicaut in Vannes, France where he works as a journalist.

== Filmography ==
=== Film ===
| Year | Title | Role | Notes |
|---|---|---|---|
| 1990 | Elvis Killed My Brother | Chad | Short |
| 1994 | Police Rescue | Const. Brian Morley | |
| 1996 | Bits & Pieces | Man | Short |
| 1998 | Larger Than Life | Dave | Short |
| 2004 | Southern Cross | Reilley | |
| 2005 | The Great Raid | Lt. Able | |

=== Television ===
| Year | Title | Role | Notes |
|---|---|---|---|
| 1992–1995 | Police Rescue | Const. Brian Morley | Main role (series 2–4) |
| 1993, 1996 | G.P. | Gary Davis / David Rooker | Episodes: "Square Pegs", "Will You Still Love Me Tomorrow?: Part 1" |
| 1994 | Blue Heelers | Glenn Ritchie | Episode: "The Men in Her Life" |
| 1996 | Water Rats | Kevin Holloway | Recurring role (series 1) |
| 1996 | The Munsters Scary Little Christmas | Tom | TV film |
| 1997 | The Hostages | Steve | TV film |
| 1997 | Murder Call | Ezra Sims | Episode: "Ashes to Ashes" |
| 1997–1999 | Xena: Warrior Princess | Palaemon / Pompey | Episodes: "Blind Faith", "When in Rome...", "A Good Day", "Endgame" |
| 1998 | SeaChange | Ray | Episode: "Love Me or Leave Me" |
| 1998 | The Violent Earth | John Sutton | TV miniseries |
| 1998 | Young Hercules | Pollux | Episodes: "Winner Take All", "Dad Always Liked Me Best" |
| 1998 | Shortland Street | Giles Redman | TV series |
| 1999 | Wildside | Vito Balliano | Episode: "2.13" |
| 1999 | Secret Men's Business | Ian Mooney | TV film |
| 2000 | Farscape | Bartender | Episode: "Dream a Little Dream" |
| 2000–01 | The Lost World | Osric (adult) / Alex Linden | Episodes: "Resurrection", "Under Pressure" |
| 2001 | Hard Knox | Snack | TV film |
| 2001 | Halifax f.p. | Alex | Episode: "The Scorpion's Kiss" |
| 2001–02 | BeastMaster | Balcifer | Episodes: "The Legend Reborn", "The Choice", "End Game", "A New Dawn" |
| 2002 | Something in the Air | Dave Gorman | Guest role |
| 2002 | The Hostages | Richard | TV film |
| 2003 | MDA | Justin Harris | Episodes: "A Time and a Place", "Aftershocks", "Taking It on the Chin" |
| 2004 | Holby City | Peter Hodges | Episodes: "The Kindness of Strangers", "The Heart of the Matter", "Baptism of Fire" |
