= Secret Men's Business =

- Written by: Nicholas Hammond; Christopher David Lee
- Directed by: Ken Cameron
- Starring: Ben Mendelsohn; Marcus Graham; Simon Baker; Jeremy Sims; Jeremy Callaghan; Maya Stange; Rhondda Findleton; Joel Edgerton
- Country of origin: Australia
- Original language: English

Production
- Producer: Sue Masters
- Running time: 96 minutes

Original release
- Release: 1999

Secret Men's Business is a 1999 Australian television film about five friends reunited after the death of a former teacher.

== Cast ==
- Ben Mendelsohn as Doug Peterson
- Marcus Graham as Michael Schofield
- Simon Baker as Andy Greville
- Jeremy Sims as Warwick Jones
- Jeremy Callaghan as Ian Mooney
- Maya Stange as Emma
- Ann Burbrook as Bec
- Rhondda Findleton as Mrs. Healey
- Joel Edgerton as Baz
- Tory Mussett as Kim

== Accolades ==
Simon Baker was nominated for the award for Best Performance by an Actor in a Leading Role in a Telefeature or Mini-Series at the 2000 Australian Film Institute Awards.
