= The Secret Life of Us =

Australian television drama series

- Season 1 title card
- Genre: Melodrama; Comedy drama
- Created by: John Edwards; Amanda Higgs
- Starring: Claudia Karvan; Samuel Johnson; Deborah Mailman; Abi Tucker; Joel Edgerton; Sibylla Budd; David Tredinnick; Spencer McLaren; Damian De Montemas; Michael Dorman
- Narrated by: Samuel Johnson; Deborah Mailman
- Country of origin: Australia
- Original language: English
- No. of seasons: 4
- No. of episodes: 86 (List of episodes)

Production
- Executive producers: John Edwards; Amanda Higgs
- Production locations: St Kilda, Melbourne, Victoria
- Running time: 45 minutes
- Production companies: Southern Star Entertainment; Network 10; Optus Television

Original release
- Network: Network Ten
- Release: 16 July 2001 – 28 December 2005

The Secret Life of Us is an Australian television drama series set in the beachside neighbourhood of St Kilda, a suburb of Melbourne, Victoria, Australia. It is primarily a drama with some comedic moments. It screened in Australia from 2001 to 2005 on Network Ten and on Channel 4 in the UK.

It has been shown in other countries such as New Zealand (TV3) where it is rated R16 for offensive language and sex scenes; Ireland (RTÉ Two), Canada (SuperChannel3), the Netherlands (Yorin), France (Canal Plus, France 4), Estonia (ETV, Kanal 11), Norway (NRK), Serbia (B92, TV Avala), Russia (TNT, Muz TV), Israel (Channel 2), South Africa (M-Net), and the United States (Hulu). The series won three silver Logie Awards.

== Plot ==
The show revolves around a group of friends in their mid 20s to early 30s who live in a St Kilda block of flats. Their interaction with one another, relationships with other friends, and romantic interests, along with their personal and career developments, are featured.

The actual block is 14A Acland Street, St. Kilda and the rooftop is at the Belvedere Flats on the Esplanade in the same suburb.

== History ==
The Secret Life of Us had its genesis in a telemovie; a 22-episode first season was commissioned by Network 10 before the movie screened.

The show had a budget of $5.3 million dollars during its first season. Ownership was jointly split between three of its producers/financiers; Southern Star Group, Optus Television and Network 10. Additionally, the UK's Channel 4 provided funding for the show's first three seasons, although they are not mentioned among the copyright holders in the credits. Channel 4 pulled out after the third series and the fourth series was not aired in the UK. As its popularity rose in Australia during the first season, issues arose between the show's creators and Network 10, which saw higher ratings when it screened before 9:30. This necessitated cutting scenes with sexual themes.

The inclusion of a prominent Aboriginal character (Kelly Lewis, played by Deborah Mailman) attracted comment at the time of the series' broadcast, and has since been cited as a landmark in the history of media representations of Indigenous Australians.

The series has been noted as significant for its inclusion of a central, gay coming out narrative in its first season (Richie Blake, played by Spencer McLaren).

The show's ratings began to dwindle following the departure of several key actors and the introduction of new characters and cast members. This began in the second season with the departure of Joel Edgerton and Damian De Montemas. The third season featured a particularly high character turnover, and included the departure of key original cast members Claudia Karvan and Abi Tucker. Production ended in 2004 with the completion of the fourth season. The decision had been made to discontinue production after the first three episodes of the fourth season aired in Australia to disastrously low ratings. At that time, the program was removed from its primetime slot. The unscreened episodes from that final season were broadcast with little publicity in late 2005.

Five main cast members – Sibylla Budd, Spencer McLaren, Dan Spielman, Nina Liu, and Gigi Edgley – left at the end of season three and original lead Samuel Johnson left early in season four, followed by Michael Dorman three episodes later. Original cast members Deborah Mailman and David Tredinnick continued, and seven new regular characters were added for season four. The changes were part of a larger overhaul which had the arrival of a new producer, a new script producer, and a new writing team.

== Cast ==
=== Main / regular ===
- Claudia Karvan as Dr. Alex Christensen (Seasons 1–3, Episodes 1–50, 64–66)
- Deborah Mailman as Kelly Lewis (Seasons 1–4, Episodes 1–86)
- Samuel Johnson as Evan Wylde (Seasons 1–4, Episodes 1–72)
- Abi Tucker as Miranda Lang (Seasons 1–3, Episodes 1–56)
- Joel Edgerton as Will McGill (Seasons 1–2, Episodes 1–30, 42–43)
- Spencer McLaren as Richie Andrew Blake (Seasons 1–3, Episodes 1–66)
- Sibylla Budd as Gabrielle Kovitch (Seasons 1–3, Episodes 1–66)
- Damian De Montemas as Jason Kennedy (Seasons 1–2, Episodes 1–44)
- David Tredinnick as Simon Felix Trader (Seasons 1–4, 86 episodes)
- Michael Dorman as Christian Edwards (Seasons 2–4, Episodes 31–75)
- Dan Spielman as Dr. Patrick A.K.A. "Tidy" (Season 3, Episodes 45–66)
- Nina Liu as Chloe (Season 3, Episodes 45–66)
- Gigi Edgley as Georgina "George" (Season 3, Episodes 52–65)
- Sullivan Stapleton as Justin Davies (Seasons 3–4, Episodes 62–86)
- Stephen Curry as Stuart Woodcock (Season 4, Episodes 67–86)
- Brooke Harman as Bree Sanzaro (Season 4, Episodes 67–86)
- Nicholas Coghlan as Adam Beckwith (Season 4, Episodes 67–86)
- Alexandra Schepisi as Lucy Beckwith (Season 4, Episodes 67–86)
- Anna Torv as Nicola "Nikki" Martel (Season 4, Episodes 67–86)
- Ryan Johnson as Zelko Milanovic (Season 4, Episodes 73–86)

=== Recurring guests ===
- Benjamin McNair as Joseph (Season 1)
- Jessica Gower as Samantha Conrad (Season 1)
- Tasma Walton as Leah (Season 1)
- Oscar Redding as Eric (Season 1)
- Catherine McClements as Carmen (Seasons 1–2)
- Terry Kenwrick as Mr Loman (Season 1)
- Leverne McDonnell as Kelly's Boss (Season 1)
- Todd MacDonald as Nathan Lieberman (Seasons 1–3)
- Damian Walshe-Howling as Mac (Season 1)
- Steve Mouzakis as Paolo (Season 1)
- Kenneth Ransom as Brad (Season 1)
- Alice Garner as Caitlin (Seasons 1–2)
- Vince Colosimo as Anthony 'Rex' Mariani (Seasons 2–3)
- Amanda Douge as Jennifer (Season 2)
- Debra Byrne as Pia (Season 2)
- Jacek Koman as Dominic (Season 2)
- Mary Coustas as Peace Picabo (Season 2)
- Diana Glenn as Jemima Taylor (Seasons 2–4)
- Daniela Farinacci as Francesca (Season 2)
- Murray Bartlett as Nick (Season 2)
- Rhys Muldoon as Frank Goodman (Seasons 3–4)
- Torquil Neilson as Jake (Season 3)
- Pia Miranda as Talia (Seasons 3–4)
- Pamela Rabe as Luciana (Season 3)
- Nathan Page as Charlie (Season 3)
- Mark Priestley as Marcus Nelson (Season 4)
- Jonathon Dutton as Jeff (Season 4)
- Aaron Pedersen as Corey Mailins (Season 4)
- Ben Mendelsohn as Rob (Season 4)
- Nicholas Bell as Marc (Season 4)

== Episodes ==
Series	Episodes	Originally released	
Series	Episodes	First released	Last released
1	22	16 July 2001	26 November 2001
2	22	18 February 2002	5 August 2002
3	22	10 February 2003	11 August 2003
4	20	18 February 2004	28 December 2005

== Series ratings ==
Season	Episodes	Originally aired		Viewership		
Season	Episodes	Season premiere	Season finale	Viewers (millions)	Rating	Drama Rank
1	22	23 July 2001	26 November 2001	0.977	7.4	#10
2	22	18 February 2002	5 August 2002	1.177	8.9	#7
3	22	10 February 2003	11 August 2003	0.994	7.4	#9
4	20	18 February 2004	28 December 2005	0.581	4.3	#7

== Home media ==
The first three seasons of The Secret Life of Us were made available on Region 2 in the UK; season one was released in two parts via VCI in 2003, where as the second and third seasons were distributed by Revelation Films in 2007.

On Region 4 in Australia, all four seasons have been released between 2004 and 2005. The first season was originally released by Shock Records, while the remainder seasons were made available under Liberation Music DVD. A complete series set was distributed by Umbrella Entertainment in 2010, before releasing all four seasons individually in 2012. Via Vision acquired distribution rights and released a complete series set in 2020.

Season	Release date			Special features
Season	Region 2	Region 4	Region 4 (re-issue)	Special features
Season 1 – Part 1	27 October 2003	—N/a	—N/a	
Season 1 – Part 2	27 October 2003	—N/a	—N/a	
Complete Season 1	—N/a	8 March 2004	2 September 2012	
Complete Season 2	22 January 2007	8 October 2004	2 September 2012	
Complete Season 3	20 August 2007	11 October 2004	2 September 2012	
Complete Season 4	—N/a	10 October 2005	2 September 2012	
Complete Series	—N/a	10 November 2010	7 October 2020	Behind the Scenes Documentary: 'The Secret Life of The Secret Life of Us'; Interviews: Talking with Claudia Karvan, Talking with Joel Edgerton, Talking with Judi McCrossin, Talking with Spencer McClaren and David Tredinnick, Talking with Deborah Mailman, Talking with Sibylla Budd and Damien de Montemas; Exclusive Interview with Samuel Johnson, Exclusive Interview with Abi Tucker; Photo gallery

== See also ==
- List of Australian television series
