= Four Jacks (film) =

2001 film by Matthew George

- Directed by: Matthew George
- Written by: Matthew George
- Produced by: Stephen Stanford
- Starring: Stephen Pease; Lachy Hulme
- Release date: 2001
- Running time: 92 minutes
- Country: Australia
- Language: English

Four Jacks is a 2001 Australian thriller.

== Cast ==
- Stephen Pease
- Lachy Hulme as Carl Porter
- Tommy Dysart as Lance

== Awards ==
The movie won Best Film, Best Male Director and Best Male Actor at the 2001 Melbourne Underground Film Festival.
