= Real Prison Breaks =

British television series

Real Prison Breaks is a British television series shown on ITV4 and Pick TV in 2010 and 2011, which documents prison escapes from around the world. In each episode three prison escapes are documented and reconstructed, usually one from the United States, United Kingdom, Australia or Ireland. It is narrated by Sean Bean.

== Episodes ==
=== Season 1 ===
1. Court House Killer (13 July 2010)
2. Prisoner in Paradise (13 July 2010)
3. Honeymoon's Over (20 July 2010)
4. Nothing to Lose (20 July 2010)
5. Postage Freedom (27 July 2010)
6. Oral High Jinks (27 July 2010)
7. Everything's Bigger in Texas (3 August 2010)
8. Casanova's Leap (3 August 2010
9. Digging Out (10 August 2010)
10. Tragic Consequence (10 August 2010)

=== Season 2 ===
1. The Pact (9 August 2011)
2. The Poster Caper (9 August 2011)
3. Runaway Chuck (16 August 2011)
4. Love on the Run (16 August 2011)
5. Lovelorn & Airborne (23 August 2011)
6. The Torturer (23 August 2011)
7. The Escapist (30 August 2011)
8. A Fugitive Among Us (6 September 2011)
9. Trooper Tragedy (13 September 2011)
10. Gone to the Dogs (20 September 2011)
11. Love Behind Bars (27 September 2011)
12. Love & Loyalty (4 October 2011)
