= New Idea =

Australian weekly magazine

- Cover of magazine from April 2010.
- Editor: Karleigh Smith
- Categories: Women's magazine
- Frequency: Weekly
- Founder: Thomas Shaw Fitchett
- Founded: 1902; 124 years ago
- Company: Are Media
- Country: Australia
- Based in: Sydney
- Language: English
- Website: www.newidea.com.au
- ISSN: 0028-5404

New Idea is a long-running Australian weekly magazine aimed at women, now published by Are Media.

== History ==
The magazine was first published in 1902 by Fitchett Bros. The founder was Thomas Shaw Fitchett. It was subtitled A Women's Home Journal for Australia. In 1911 the magazine was renamed as Everylady’s journal, but in 1928 the title was changed back to New Idea. Fitchett Brothers changed the name of their company to Southdown Press (later renamed Pacific Magazines). Following World War II the company was acquired by Keith Murdoch and then became part of the Murdoch media consortium.

In June 2006, the magazine was ranked 3rd in Australia in circulation, with an audited circulation of 433,176; it ranked ahead of Reader's Digest. The magazine's readership in 2004 was in excess of 2 million and had increased to 2.364 million in 2005/6; that is the magazine is read by more than 10% of Australia's population. However, in recent years weekly sales figures have dropped to a March 2014 audit of 280,206. In December 2014 readership had halved to 1.265 million,

== Content ==
In what may be termed the golden era of popular magazines, 1950–1980, a popular column was "Mere Male", where readers recounted humorous stories where an "MM", usually a husband, was the (affectionate) butt of the joke. Several anthologies of stories from the period have been published and the expression became part of the Australian vernacular.

== Controversies ==
In January 2008, it revealed details that Prince Harry was with the British army serving in Afghanistan, in breach of an agreement with the major news organisations. It ran updates on the story on two further occasions. When the United States Drudge Report ran the story on 28 February 2008, the prince was forced to abandon his posting and return to the UK. After the story broke much more widely, New Idea pulled the story from its web site and made itself unavailable for comment to other members of the press. Two months later, the magazine issued an apology for publishing the story. "We regret this serious lapse of judgment. We sincerely apologise to all our readers, to the servicemen whose lives are at constant risk while serving at home and abroad and to their families and loved ones."

New Idea was criticised on the Australian Broadcasting Corporation's Media Watch for the use of sensationalist headlines and content.

In 2016, actress Eliza Szonert threatened to sue New Idea because the magazine refused to pay her an agreed sum of A$7000 for a tell-all interview about claiming back her child from an ex-partner living overseas, with the magazine claiming she had lied about entering drug rehabilitation.

As of 2020, New Idea is published by Are Media, the successor to Bauer Media Australia.

== Personnel ==
Editor-in-Chief

- Dulcie Boling 1977–1993
- Louisa Hatfield 2005–2017
- Frances Sheen 2017–2018
- Emma Nolan 2018–

Deputy editors

- Nene King

== See also ==
- Health promotion
- List of women's magazines
- List of men's magazines
- List of Australian magazines
- List of newspapers in Australia
