= David Tredinnick (actor) =

Australian actor

David Tredinnick is an Australian actor. An experienced actor with a long career in theatre, he is perhaps best known for his regular role as bar owner Simon Trader in the television series The Secret Life of Us.

== Biography ==
Tredinnick was born in the Melbourne suburb of Glen Waverley. He battled anorexia as a teenager and was obsessed with extreme exercise. Tredinnick studied arts at Melbourne University where he became interested in theatre. He joined the university theatre company and performed in local fringe theatre for a number of years. This was to earn him his first major role as a lead in the Melbourne Theatre Company production of Angels in America in 1993, a performance which won him a prestigious Green Room Award.

Tredinnick was a regular in the Melbourne theatre scene throughout the 1990s, working with most of the major theatre companies, and featuring in an array of plays, including The Talented Mr Ripley, Roulette, Dealer's Choice and Strangers in the Night. He also appeared in a number of independent films, including Dead on Time, Derwent Envy, Life, Pozieres and Zone 39. Tredinnick also made a number of guest appearances on television, appearing on All Together Now, Blue Heelers, Something in the Air, State Coroner and Halifax f.p.. His appearance in the latter saw him nominated for an Australian Film Institute Award for Best Actor in a Leading Role in a Television Drama for the episode "Swimming with Sharks".

In 2001 he won the role of gay bar owner Simon Trader on the Ten Network series The Secret Life of Us. He was one of the few actors to last through the series' four seasons, appearing as the dryly wise character until the series was axed in 2005.

Tredinnick is also a noted narrator of talking books, having narrated more than fifty titles. He won the Vision Australia Adult Narrator of the Year Award in 1998 and 1999, and won a Sanderson Young Adult Narrator of the Year Award in 2001.

== Filmography ==
=== Film ===
Year	Title	Role	Type
	Dead on Time		Independent film
	Derwent Envy		Independent film
	Life		Independent film
	Pozieres		Independent film
1996	Zone 39		Feature film
1999	Halifax f.p.	David Neilson / Gautama	TV film, 2 episodes, including Swimming with Sharks

=== Television ===
Year	Title	Role	Type
	All Together Now	Guest appearance	TV series
	Blue Heelers	Guest appearance	TV series
	Something in the Air	Guest appearance	TV series
	State Coroner		TV series
2001-05	The Secret Life of Us	Simon Trader	TV series

== Theatre ==
Year	Title	Role	Type
1993	Angels in America	Main role	Melbourne Theatre Company
	The Talented Mr Ripley		
	Roulette		
	Dealer's Choice		
	Strangers in the Night		

== Personal life ==
Tredinnick lives in Melbourne with his partner, location scout Annetta Labb.
