= Battlefronts =

- Genre: Lifestyle
- Presented by: Giaan Rooney
- Country of origin: Australia
- Original language: English
- No. of seasons: 1

Original release
- Network: Nine Network
- Release: 2008

Battlefronts is an Australian lifestyle and DIY television series that aired on the Nine Network in 2008. It is hosted by former Olympic swimmer, Giaan Rooney.
