= Men with Guns (1997 Canadian film) =

1997 Canadian crime drama film

- Directed by: Kari Skogland
- Written by: Lachy Hulme
- Produced by: Ilana Frank
- Starring: Donal Logue; Gregory Sporleder; Paul Sorvino; Callum Keith Rennie
- Cinematography: Danny Nowak
- Edited by: Susan Maggi
- Music by: Eric Cadesky
- Production companies: Norstar Entertainment; The Movie Network
- Distributed by: New Films International
- Release date: September 9, 1997 (TIFF)
- Running time: 89 minutes
- Country: Canada
- Language: English

Men with Guns is a 1997 Canadian crime drama film directed by Kari Skogland. The film stars Donal Logue, Paul Sorvino, and Gregory Sporleder.

The cast also includes Callum Keith Rennie, Max Perlich, Joseph Griffin, Bill MacDonald, Janet Kidder, Sabrina Grdevich, Jack Duffy, Mimi Kuzyk, Joe Pingue and Tony Nappo.

== Plot ==
Goldman and Lucas are two smalltime hustlers who run afoul of local mob boss Horace Burke when they discover and steal a stash of cocaine.

== Release and reception ==
The film premiered in the Perspective Canada program at the 1997 Toronto International Film Festival. The film faced some press criticism for its title, as American filmmaker John Sayles had also screened a film titled Men with Guns at TIFF just four days earlier.
