= Police Rescue =

Australian television series

- Also known as: Police Rescue – Gefährlicher Einsatz (Germany), "Noodroep" (Afrikaans – South Africa), Polizia Squadra Soccorso (Italy); Sydney Police (France); Záchranáři (Czech Republic)
- Written by: Christopher Lee; Debra Oswald; Philip Cornford
- Directed by: Peter Fisk (1989–1993); Michael Carson (1991–1993); Scott Hartford-Davis (1995–1996)
- Starring: Gary Sweet; Sonia Todd; Steve Bastoni; John Clayton; Tammy MacIntosh; Belinda Cotterill; Jeremy Callaghan; Doug Scroope; Steve Bisley; Frank Holden; Marshall Napier; Tim McKenzie; Peter Browne; Ada Nicodemou; Salvatore Coco; Leah Purcell
- Composers: Martin Armiger; Garry Hardman; Derek Williams
- Country of origin: Australia
- Original language: English
- No. of series: 5
- No. of episodes: 61 + pilot

Production
- Executive producers: Penny Chapman; Kim Williams; Errol Sullivan
- Producers: John Edwards; Sandra Levy
- Production locations: New South Wales, Australia
- Cinematography: Steve Arnold; Russell Bacon; Stephen Windon
- Editor: Various
- Running time: 50 minutes 90 minutes (pilot)
- Production companies: Australian Broadcasting Corporation; British Broadcasting Corporation; Southern Star Xanadu

Original release
- Network: ABC
- Release: 15 March 1989 – 22 November 1996

Police Rescue is an Australian television series that aired on ABC TV between 1989 and 1996. It was produced by the ABC and Southern Star Xanadu in association with the BBC.

Apart from the 61 episodes, there was a 90-minute pilot episode (first screened in 1989) as well as a feature film in 1994, starring Zoe Carides.

The series dealt with the New South Wales Police Rescue Squad based in Sydney and their work attending to various incidents from road accidents to train crashes. The show was very well received for the first four series, however a decline in ratings by the commencement of the 1996 series saw the cancellation of the show, following an almost epitaph in the final three episodes.

Police Rescue was shown in the United Kingdom first on BBC1 and later on Sky One, in the Czech Republic as Záchranáři on TV Nova, in South Africa as "Noodroep" (dubbed in Afrikaans), in parts of Italy as Polizia Squadra Soccorso on T9, in France on TF1 as Sydney Police, in Germany on VOX as Police Rescue – Gefährlicher Einsatz, in Norway, Sweden, the Netherlands and Denmark on the United Kingdom-based TV3, and in the Republic of Ireland on RTÉ.

== Cast ==
=== Main ===
Actor/actress	Character	Rank	Tenure	Episodes
Gary Sweet	Steve "Mickey" McClintock	Sergeant	1989–1996	01–61 + Pilot Episode & Feature Film
Sonia Todd	Georgia Rattray	Constable/Senior Constable/Sergeant	1989–1996	01–61 + Pilot Episode & Feature Film
Tim McKenzie	Peter "Ridgy" Ridgeway	Sergeant	1989–1990	01-13 + Pilot Episode
John Clayton	Bill Adams	Inspector	1989–1996	01–61 + Pilot Episode & Feature Film
Marshall Napier	Fred "Frog" Catteau	Sergeant	1989–1992	01-19 + Pilot Episode
Peter Browne	Trevor "Sootie" Coledale	Constable	1989–1990	01-14 + Pilot Episode
Doug Scroope	Percy "Ptomaine" Warren	Constable	1989–1993	01-32 + Pilot Episode
Steve Bastoni	Yiannis "Angel" Angelopoulos	Constable/Senior Constable	1990–1996	01-61 + Feature Film
Steve Bisley	Kevin "Nipper" Harris	Senior Sergeant	1992–1995	14–42
Belinda Cotterill	Sharyn Elliott		1992–1994, 1996	14–39, 53–61 + Feature Film
Tammy MacIntosh	Kathy Orland	Constable	1992–1995	14–52 + Feature Film
Jeremy Callaghan	Brian Morley	Constable	1992–1995	19–52 + Feature Film
Ada Nicodemou	Anastasia Skouras		1994–1995	40–52
Frank Holden	Glenn "Spider" Webb	Senior Sergeant	1994–1996	43–61
Zoe Carides	Lorrie "Flash" Gordon	Constable	1994	Feature Film Only
Salvatore Coco	Joe Cardillo	Constable	1996	53–61
Leah Purcell	Tracy Davis	Constable	1996	53–61

=== Recurring minor cast ===
Actor/actress	Character	Rank	Tenure	Episodes
Kerry Armstrong	Des McClintock	Mickey Ex-Wife	1990–1991	
Deborah Kennedy	Bronwyn Catteau		1990–1992	3 episodes
Harold Hopkins	Tony Fuller	NARC Detective	1990–1992	
Gia Carides	Helena Angelopoulos		1992–1993	7 episodes
Lani John Tupu	David Goldberg		1992	Season 2
Daniel Rigney	Constable Lohmeier	Constable	1993	Season 3

=== Guests ===
Actor/actress	Character	Tenure	Episodes
Alan David Lee	Simmo	1994	TV movie: "Police Rescue in Action"
Anne Tenney	Katie McCarthy	1991	Season 1, episode 9 :"One for Dad"
Bec Cartwright	Emma	1992	Season 2, episode 9: "Reasons to Live"
Ben Mendelsohn	Dean Forman	1995	Season 4, episode 13: "Wild Card"
Bob Baines	Frank Williams	1991	Season 1, episode 13: "By the Book"
Cate Blanchett	Mrs Haines / Vivian	1993	Season 3. episode 5: "The Loaded Boy" & TV movie: "Police Rescue In Action"
Celia Ireland	Lachlan's mother	1992	Season 2, episode 2: "Sugar"
Claudia Black	Julia	1993	Season 3, episode: "Double Illusion"
Colleen Anne Fitzpatrick	Fay McClintock	1992; 1993	Season 2–3, 2 episodes
Colin Friels	Lew Campbell	1992	Season 2, 1 episode
Damian de Montemas	Greg	1995	Season 4, 1 episode
Daniel Wyllie	Owen	1993	Season 3, 1 episode
Darren Gilshenan	Nick	1993	Season 3, episode: "Wild Goose Chase"
David Field	Paul	1992	Season 2, 1 episode
David Wenham	Ferret	1991	Season 1, episode: "The Cosmic Lightbeam"
Debra Byrne	Maria Mellick / Tricia Mellick	1991; 1992	Season 1–2, 2 episodes
Fiona Corke	Sandra	1995	Season 4, 1 episode
Gabrielle Fitzpatrick	The Waitress	1991	Season 1, episode: "Mates"
Gennie Nevinson	Alice Mortimer	1993	Season 3, episode 12: "Double Illusion"
Jessica Napier	Therese / Tracey / Zoe	1991; 1996	Season 1, 2 episodes: "L.P.G.", "One for Dad" Season 5, episode: "The Only Constant"
Joel Edgerton	Andy	1995	Season 4, episode 13: "Wild Card"
John Jarratt	Dave	1994	Season 4, episode 9: "Public Mischief"
John Noble	Sergeant	1991	Season 1, episode 10: "Hostage"
Judith McGrath	Hazel	1995	Season 4, 1 episode
Justin Rosniak	Sam	1993–1996	Season 3–5, 4 episodes
Kelly Dingwall	Dylan	1991	Season 1, 1 episode
Kim Krejus	Bernadette Kelly	1991	Season 1, 1 episode
Kristy Wright	Cassie	1994	Season 4, episode 4
Leeanna Walsman	Debbie	1996	Season 5, 1 episode
Marnie Reece-Wilmore	Danni	1995	Season 4, 1 episode
Melissa Jaffer	Gwen	1995	Season 4, 1 episode
Melissa Tkautz	Helen Catteau	1991	Season 1, 1 episode
Michael Denkha	First Mate	1996	Season 5, 1 episode
Miranda Otto	Amanda	1995	Season 4, episode: "On the Outer"
Nash Edgerton	Alex's mate	1994	TV movie: "Police Rescue in Action"
Peter Phelps	Alex Willis	1996	Season 5, 3 episodes
Peter Whitford	Russell	1992	Season 2, episode 6: "Stakeout"
Philip Quast	Bob Harrison	1991	Season 1, episode 1: "Mates"
Rel Hunt	Dog / Hugo	1993; 1994	Season 3, episode 8: "Speeding", TV movie: "Police Rescue in Action"
Richard Carter	Vic Wilson	1991	Season 1, 1 episode
Ritchie Singer	Daryl	1989	Pilot
Rob Carlton	Young Prisoner	1992	Season 1, 1 episode
Robert Mammone	Truck Driver	1992	Season 2, 1 episode
Roxane Wilson	Tessa	1996	Season 5, episode 9: "That Only Constant"
Roy Billing	Myer	1991	Season 1, 1 episode
Russell Crowe	Constable Tom 'Bomber' Young	1992	Season 2, episode 2: "The Right Stuff"
Shane Connor	Geoff	1992	Season 2, episode 13: "Heartbeat"
Sharyn Hodgson	Kerry	1998	1 episode
Simon Lyndon	Matt	1996	Season 5, 1 episode
Steve Le Marquand	Youth	1993	Season 3, 1 episode
Steven Vidler	Scuderi	1995	Season 4, 1 episode
Susan Lyons	Janet	1995	Season 4, 1 episode
Susan Prior	Debra	1996	Season 5, 1 episode
Tara Morice	Jenny	1991	Season 1, 1 episode
Tim Campbell	Hugo	1996	Season 5, episode 6: "Double Jeopardy "
Tony Bonner	Paul	1992	Season 2, 1 episode
Wynn Roberts	Anthony Mason	1991	Season 1, 1 episode
Zoe Carides	Constable Lorrie 'Flash' Gordon	1994	TV movie: "Police Rescue in Action"

== Episodes ==
=== Pilot movie ===
In mid-1989, Southern Star Xanadu broadcast the pilot episode of Police Rescue via the Australian Broadcasting Corporation. The 90-minute telemovie established the background of the protagonist of the series, Sergeant "Mickey" McClintock (Gary Sweet). Several issues were raised in the pilot, such as women's discrimination, sexism and street violence. The plot evolved around the entrance of the first woman member to the Police Rescue Squad, Constable Georgia Rattray (Sonia Todd) and then the search for a missing boy in Sydney's sewer system.

No. overall	No. in season	Title	Directed by	Written by	Original release date
Pilot	Pilot	"Rescue"	Peter Fisk	Everett De Roche	15 March 1989
The 90-minute telemovie established the background of the protagonist of the series, Sergeant "Mickey" McClintock. Several issues were raised in the pilot, such as women's discrimination, sexism and street violence. The plot evolved around the entrance of the first woman member to the Police Rescue Squad, Constable Georgia Rattray and then the search for a missing boy in Sydney's sewer system.

=== Season 1 (1991) ===
The telemovie was well received and spawned the series of Police Rescue, which carried on shortly after the pilot.

No. overall	No. in season	Title	Directed by	Written by	Original release date
1	1	"Mates"	Michael Carson	Peter Schreck	14 February 1991
A highly successful businessman threatens suicide, making Mickey realise how lucky he really is.
2	2	"Angel After Hours"	Michael Jenkins	Peter Schreck	21 February 1991
A visiting psychologist learns to respect the Rescue team when he joins them for a rugged night shift, and Angel is forced to share his family crisis with Mickey.
3	3	"LPG"	Ann Turner	Philip Cornford	28 February 1991
A liquid petroleum gas tanker crashes with another vehicle trapping one driver and his young son, as the tankers are parted for the rescue to begin they notice that there are chlorine pellets on the floor which if they get wet will have cause a thermal explosion. To make matters worse a LPG plant is just down the road. The whole area is cordoned of as rescue is set about extracting the driver and his son. Meanwhile back at base, one of the team struggles with past addictions due to the death of his beloved pet dog.
4	4	"The Cosmic Lightbeam"	Graham Thorburn	Christopher Lee	7 March 1991
A lock-out, a break-in, and a police trainee spell trouble for 'Mickey'.
5	5	"Mad Dog"	Michael Carson	Peter Schreck	14 March 1991
A prison guard strike leads to the male members of the squad being sent to substitute and an escape.
6	6	"Saturday Night"	Karl Zwicky	Steve Wright	21 March 1991
On a fishing trip Ridgy gets washed ashore while trying to rescue another man from drowning.
7	7	"Reunion with Snake"	Mike Smith	John Lonie	28 March 1991
Two boys get chemical burns after playing in a tunnel.
8	8	"Raid"	Riccardo Pellizzeri	Steve Wright	11 April 1991
While Mickey and Angel are in competition for the new hire's attention, the squad is tasked to work with Special Operations to go after a gangster for murder.
9	9	"One for Dad"	Michael Pattinson	Christopher Lee	18 April 1991
Mickey and Frog spend a long night in a swamp while looking for a missing girl.
10	10	"Hostage"	Geoffrey Nottage	Philip Cornford	25 April 1991
Mickey and Georgia get caught up in a shoot out by a bank robber who has taken a hostage.
11	11	"Up a Tree"	Riccardo Pellizzeri	Christopher Lee	2 May 1991
Animal rescue to riot control – a typical day for the Police Rescue Squad... or is it?
12	12	"Saving the Princess"	Lynn Hegarty	Steve Wright	16 May 1991
The squad gets called out to free a man trapped during a building demolition but end up finding Romeo and Juliet.
13	13	"By the Book"	Peter Fisk	Peter Schreck	13 June 1991
Mickey stands by Georgia when she makes an unpopular decision on an MVA call.

=== Season 2 (1992) ===
No. overall	No. in season	Title	Directed by	Written by	Original release date
14	1	"The Right Stuff"	Unknown	Unknown	3 September 1992
Constable Tom 'Bomber' Young (Russell Crowe), a footy hero, joins the squad with disastrous results.
15	2	"Off the Track"	Debra Oswald	Unknown	10 September 1992
When a car and commuter train collide, it's an emotionally and physically draining shift for the entire squad.
16	3	"The Hard Way"	Unknown	Unknown	17 September 1992
Georgia finds a car crash involving a couple suspicious and wonder if the woman tried to kill her husband.
17	4	"The Big Canary"	Unknown	Unknown	24 September 1992
Fraud Squad Head Superintendent Tony Daniels, ask Bill Adams if Rescue can guard a Dr. Baldwin – in a secret operation. Mickey's the man for the job.
18	5	"Judgement Day"	Unknown	Unknown	1 October 1992
Frog seems to be running out of luck: first while trying to save a girl in a demolished building, then when a man kills his whole family and finally climbing down a cliff to rescue a boy.
19	6	"Stakeout"	Unknown	Unknown	15 October 1992
When on an assignment with a crashed truck, Mickey and Georgia unintentionally disturb a drug squad stakeout.
20	7	"Sugar"	Unknown	Debra Oswald	22 October 1992
After the death of Kathy's brother, she is maybe too quickly back at work and struggles to deal with handling a car crash and an accident at a sugar refinery.
21	8	"With a Vengeance"	Unknown	Unknown	29 October 1992
The team is searching for a small missing airplane and finds it hanging on a ledge with two young men trapped inside.
22	9	"Reasons to Live"	Unknown	Unknown	8 November 1992
Mickey and Angel rescue prominent artist, Lew Campbell, who has been trapped in his studio by a gas explosion. His wife, Holly, and their two young daughters have escaped unhurt.
23	10	"From This Day Forward"	Unknown	Unknown	15 November 1992
At the pub where Angel is having his bucks night, Nipper runs into an old contact, Johnny Blackett, who's just been released from a six-year jail sentence. There's obviously bad blood between them.
24	11	"Angel's Devils"	Unknown	Unknown	22 November 1992
Angel is having martial problems. When he sees Helena getting out of a sportscar outside her office then kissing the driver goodbye, Angel suspects that she is having an affair.
25	12	"The Real Meaning"	Unknown	Unknown	26 November 1992
Mickey baulks when Paramedic Tricia Mellick, tells him she is going to abseil down a skyscraper to help him rescue an unconscious man caught on a gantry between the 34th and 33rd floor.
26	13	"Heartbeat"	Peter Fisk	Debra Oswald	3 December 1992
Georgina is struggling with wedding planning. When the team is sent into a cave to rescue archaeologists caught in a flood, Mickey suddenly vanishes.

=== Season 3 (1993) ===
No. overall	No. in season	Title	Directed by	Written by	Original release date
27	1	"Lifeline"	Unknown	Debra Oswald	10 June 1993
A girl calls the rescue team telling she is locked up in a room but she don't know where. A race against time begins for the team to find the girl before her father does.
28	2	"Wild Goose Chase"	Peter Fisk	Debra Oswald	17 June 1993
Georgina has cancelled her wedding. The team is searching for a missing man but it feels like a wild goose chase.
29	3	"On a Roll"	Unknown	Unknown	24 June 1993
Angel's getting hooked on horse race gambling.
30	4	"Prodigal Daughter"	Peter Fisk	Unknown	4 July 1993
...
31	5	"The Loaded Boy"	Unknown	Unknown	8 July 1993
A truck with chemical waste crashes and a can with the possible deadly material goes missing.
32	6	"Good Buddy"	Unknown	Unknown	15 July 1993
Brian becomes friends with one of Nippers old mates, private investigater Temple, who isn't who he seems to be.
33	7	"Rush Hour"	Ian Barry	Christopher Lee	22 July 1993
Brian gets challenged with his phobia, when the rescue squad has to search for missing persons in the subway tunnels.
34	8	"Speeding"	Unknown	Unknown	29 July 1993
Mickey gets worried about his son after a car with drugged teenagers crashes.
35	9	"Lift Sixteen"	Peter Fisk	Unknown	5 August 1993
Nipper gets stuck in an elevator that breaks down due to an earthquake.
36	10	"Whirlwind"	Unknown	Debra Oswald	19 August 1993
Kathy gets a little too involved with an adrenalin junkie.
37	11	"Cold Snap"	Unknown	Debra Oswald	26 August 1993
Angel's had enough of the rivalry between Mickey and him. After a big row with Mickey, he leaves Police Rescue. He is transferred to Special Operations. 2 youngsters are stuck on a cliff. One of them is rescued by Georgia by helicopter. Mickey stays with the other one till the chopper returns for them to pick them up. They wait for hours and hours. The weather conditions get worse, as a result the helicopter cannot fly because there is too much fog. It is impossible for Mickey to climb down, because the other guy is too badly injured. The only way to get out of there is...
38	12	"Double Illusion"	Peter Fisk	Unknown	2 September 1993
A man lying at the base of a cliff leads Mickey to pursue two crooked detectives.
39	13	"The Last to Know"	Unknown	Unknown	8 September 1993
Mickey has anger management issues after his father has a heart attack.

=== Feature Film and TV Special (1994) ===
No. overall	No. in season	Title	Directed by	Written by	Release Date
1	1	"Police Rescue: In Action"	Scott Feeney	Unknown	9 March 1994 (TV Airing)
Special hosted by John Edwards and Sandra Levy that aired to promote the series, and 1994 feature film. It featured interviews with cast members, Gary Sweet, Sonia Todd, Steve Bastoni and Zoe Carides.
2	2	"Police Rescue: The Movie"	Michael Carson	Debra Oswald	17 March 1994 (Cinema Release)
Constable Laurie Gordon transfers from the Drugs Squad to Sydney's elite Police Rescue squad after her partner and lover is killed when a raid goes wrong. When allegations of corruption follow her to Rescue, Gordon must fight to regain the vital trust of the squad and Sgt. 'Mickey' McClintock. This trust is tested when a gunman takes a teacher and kids hostage at a child care centre, and the Rescue Squad is called in to assist.

=== Season 4 (1995) ===
No. overall	No. in season	Title	Directed by	Written by	Original release date
40	1	"On the Outer"	Unknown	Debra Oswald	27 April 1995
Brian is struggling with fitting in and ends up in a couple of dangerous situations.
41	2	"Conduct Endangering Life"	Unknown	Unknown	4 May 1995
A bank robbery goes wrong and Nipper's wife ends up as a hostage.
42	3	"Wrong Side of the Road"	Unknown	Debra Oswald	11 May 1995
By chance Mickey and Nipper are first on site when a bus is found crashed on the side of a mountain road which makes the rescue of the passengers more difficult.
43	4	"Something's Got to Give"	Unknown	Unknown	18 May 1995
Senior sergeant Webb's first day on the job isn't without difficulties. Nor for Georgia who hoped for the promotion after Nipper left.
44	5	"Guardian Angel"	Unknown	Unknown	25 May 1995
While having problems with his love life, Angel finds relief in taking a young boy under his wing.
45	6	"Double Jeopardy"	Unknown	Unknown	1 June 1995
A gas explosion leaves people trapped in the basement of a building. The rescue squad attempt gets even more difficult and dangerous with poisonous fumes and the risk of another explosion.
46	7	"Damage Control"	Unknown	Unknown	8 June 1995
Kathy has a hard time dealing with a drying man's last words spoken to her in belief she is his wife.
47	8	"Public Mischief"	Unknown	Debra Oswald	15 June 1995
Mickey gets hooked up with a couple living life dangerous as base jumpers, while Georgia looks into a factory with a little too many work accidents.
48	9	"Breaking Strain"	Julie Money	Greg Millin	22 June 1995
Angel tries to help his old friend, a tow truck driver.
49	10	"The Sharp End"	Unknown	Unknown	29 June 1995
When a demolition team gets ready to take down a building, something goes wrong and they get trapped in a really dangerous situation.
50	11	"Crossing The Line"	Unknown	Unknown	6 July 1995
51	12	"Rescue Me"	Unknown	Unknown	13 July 1995
Angel has difficulties coping with his hated father's death. Meanwhile Georgia tries to help a friend and her daughter after they were hurt in a gas explosion.
52	13	"Wild Card"	Unknown	Debra Oswald	20 July 1995
A cold blooded killer (Ben Mendelsohn) blames Mickey for the death of his brother and wants revenge.

=== Season 5 (1996) ===
No. overall	No. in season	Title	Directed by	Written by	Original release date
53	1	"The Ultimate"	Steve Mann	Philip Cornford	20 September 1996
The rescue squad's three new recruits gets tested to the limit while performing a rescue on a skyscraper.
54	2	"Nobby's Place"	Scott Hartford-Davis	Christopher Lee	27 September 1996
An old man keeps fishing in a dangerous place and Mickey soon loses his patience.
55	3	"The Getting of Wisdom"	Tony Tilse	Glenda Hambly	4 October 1996
Joe, the new guy, rescues a woman with psychological problems and gets a little too involved with her.
56	4	"The River"	Scott Hartford-Davis	Rick Maier	11 October 1996
Errol and his son Robbie, both big fans of flying, crash into the wilderness. During the search for the victims, Angel falls down into the ravine. The rest of the squad immediately start looking for him. But when it gets too dark, they have to go back to base camp and wait till the next day. They have no other choice than to leave him behind.
57	5	"The Ship"	Paul Faint & Steve Mann	Philip Cornford	18 October 1996
An apparent accidental explosion on a ship turns to an act of terrorism putting Police Rescue in grave danger.
58	6	"Flash the Descent"	Rowans Woods	Debra Parsons	25 October 1996
The team is sent out to rescue a couple of climbers stuck on a mountain wall.
59	7	"The Holliman Kid"	Rowans Woods	Debra Oswald	1 November 1996
When a little girl disappear every one wonders what happened to her. Meanwhile Georgia learn she's pregnant.
60	8	"Tomorrow Never Knows"	Tony Tilse	Daniel Krige	8 November 1996
When Angel's younger brother gets killed in a car accident, Angel takes his anger out on the drunk driver, who caused the crash.
61	9	"The Only Constant"	Scott Hartford-Davis	Christopher Lee	22 November 1996
The team race against time to rescue two little girls trapped in a storm drain which is quickly filling up with water. Meanwhile Angel's taking his leave and Georgia is pondering to do the same.

== Home media ==
Between 1993 and 1994 Village Roadshow released selected episodes on VHS.

In 1994 CIC-TAFT Video released Police Rescue: The Movie on VHS.

The first Police Rescue DVD releases started in November 2006 with Season 1. The following year Warner Vision released Seasons 2 and 3 in April 2007 and in July 2007 Seasons 4 and 5 were released.

The second Police Rescue DVD release was in November 2017 with Via Vision Entertainment re-releasing Police Rescue as a complete boxset (Seasons 1–5 + Pilot Movie).

As of 6 Feb 2026 – Police Rescue: The Movie and Police Rescue: In Action are still not available on DVD.

In July 2019, the Seven Network released the complete first season and second season of Police Rescue via video on demand on 7plus.

As of 2 Aug 2025 – Police Rescue is available via video on demand on ABC iview.

== VHS Releases ==
Title	Format	Ep #	Tapes	Region (Australia)	Special features	Distributors
Mates and Hostages	VHS	Series 1, Episode 1&10	01	1993	None	Village Roadshow
Mad Dog and by the Book	VHS	Series 1, Episode 5&13	01	–	None	Village Roadshow
Judgement Day and Reasons to Live	VHS	Series 2, Episodes 5&9	01	–	None	Village Roadshow
Police Rescue: The Movie	VHS	Film	01	1994	None	CIC-TAFT Home Video

== DVD Releases ==
Title	Format	Ep #	Discs/Tapes	Region 4 (Australia)	Special features	Distributors
Police Rescue: Season One	DVD	13	4	26 November 2006	90-minute pilot episode	Warner Vision
Police Rescue: Season Two	DVD	13	4	9 April 2007	None	Warner Vision
Police Rescue: Season Three	DVD	13	4	9 April 2007	None	Warner Vision
Police Rescue: Season Four (Part 1)	DVD	11	3	9 July 2007	None	Warner Vision
Police Rescue: Season Four (Part 2)	DVD	11	3	9 July 2007	None	Warner Vision
Police Rescue: The Complete Collection	DVD	61	18	22 November 2017	90-minute pilot episode	Via Vision Entertainment
Police Rescue: The Complete Collection	DVD	61	18	07 August 2024 (Re-Release)	90-minute pilot episode	Via Vision Entertainment

== Online Streaming ==
Police Rescue (Seasons 1–4) are currently streaming on multiple streaming sites around the world including 7plus, 10 (VoD service) & Amazon Prime.

As of 2 Aug 2025 – Police Rescue (Season 01-04) and The Feature Length Pilot Episode is available via video on demand on ABC iview.

Currently the Police Rescue: The Movie and Police Rescue: In Action (TV Special) are yet to get a streaming release.

== Police Rescue Collectibles ==
Title	Author	Format	Content #	Australia Release	Bonus Content
Police Rescue 1	Bill Green	Book	Novelisation of Series 1, Episodes 1, 4, 5	1992	None
Police Rescue 2	Bill Green	Book	Novelisation of Series 1, Episodes 8, 10, 11	1992	TBA
Police Rescue 3	Jack Bridson	Book	Novelisation of Series 2, Episodes 5, 11, 13	1993	TBA
Police Rescue: Omnibus- Edition	Bill Green, Jack Bridson	Book (combines Police Rescue 1, 2, 3)		1993	Cast Photo
Police Rescue: Souvenir Special	Nic Place (editor)	Magazine	Behind the Scenes	1993	Cast Posters and Cast Photos.
Police Rescue: The Movie	Bill Green	Book	Novelisation of the Feature Film	1994	TBA
Police Rescue: Trading Card	Trading Card	Featuring Gary Sweet	N/A	None	
