= Judi McCrossin =

Australian film and TV scriptwriter

Judi McCrossin is an Australian scriptwriter.

McCrossin grew up in Wilston, Queensland and studied at the University of Queensland, from which she was awarded a Bachelor of Arts.

She was a scriptwriter for the TV drama series The Secret Life of Us and The Time of Our Lives, also the docudrama Beaconsfield, all subsequently released on DVD.
