= Mandy McElhinney =

Australian actress (born 1970)

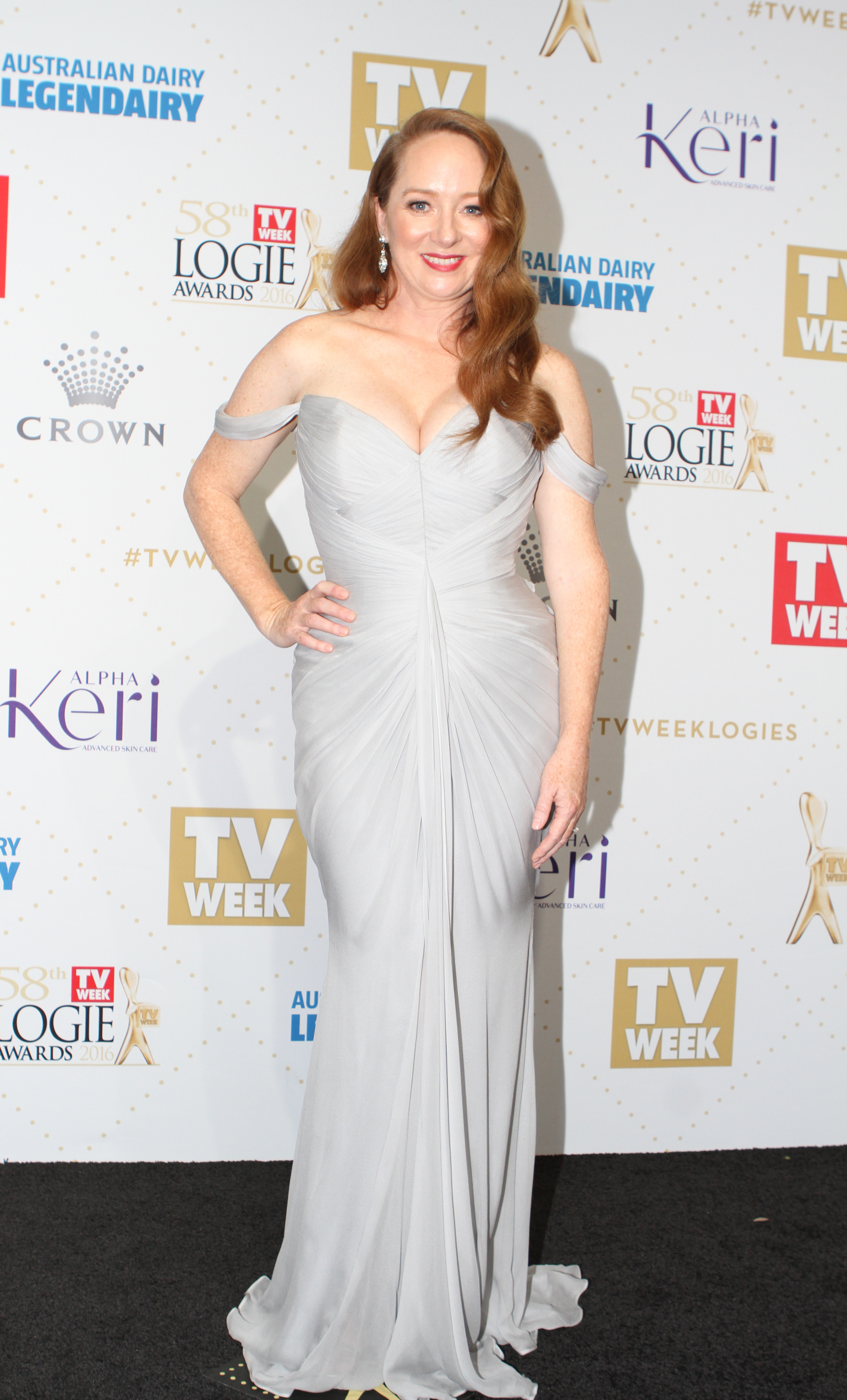
- Born: 9 September 1970 (age 56); Perth, Western Australia, Australia
- Occupation: Actress
- Years active: 1994–present
- Known for: Comedy Inc, House of Hancock

Mandy McElhinney (born 9 September 1970) is an Australian actress best known for playing Rhonda in AAMI insurance advertisements. She appeared on the sketch comedy television series, Comedy Inc., from 2003 to 2006. She appeared as Gina Rinehart in the telemovie The House of Hancock, alongside Sam Neill in 2015. McElhinney played Jackie Walters, federal agent and team leader of the Australian Federal Police Counter-Terrorism Unit in the television drama thriller series Hyde & Seek that premiered on the Nine Network in October 2016.

== Early life ==
McElhinney was born in Perth, Western Australia, to Rosemary and Andrew, and raised in Leeman. She has a younger sister, Hayley, who is also an actress. They both took drama and dance lessons as teenagers. McElhinney was bullied for her red hair as a child and so she became somewhat of a class clown making people laugh. Her "stupid" impersonations as a child have in some way given her the desire to entertain. McElhinney studied at Stella Maris Presentation College in Geraldton, which is now Nagle Catholic College.

== Personal life ==
McElhinney married Carlo, an Italian, in Sicily on 28 December 2017.

== Roles ==
McElhinney is known for appearing in many Australian television series and films, including a recurring role in 2002 and 2003 on MDA, small roles in various crime and medical dramas, and a guest role as a shop assistant in Kath & Kim. She also appeared in the film The Bank. She is also a regular in stage productions, including with the Melbourne and the Sydney Theatre Companies. She starred as Rhonda in the AAMI Safe Driver rewards series of commercials. The ad and her character's love story within it, consequently became a major part of Australian popular culture. She stars as strict Matron Frances Bolton in the Australian drama series Love Child. She played the role of mining magnate Gina Rinehart in Nine's 2015 telemovie The House of Hancock.

In 2023, McElhininey appeared in Home and Away as Margot Dafoe.

In 2024 she played advice columnist Sugar in the Sydney, Australia, Belvoir St Theatre’s adaption of Tiny Beautiful Things.

In May 2024, McElhinney was named in the cast for Stan Australia feature film Nugget Is Dead?: A Christmas Story.

In April 2025, she was cast in the Australian adaptation of the British sitcom, Ghosts, where she plays Eileen, an Irish potato famine survivor with 13 children. On 15 October 2026, she was announced as part of the cast for ABC series Shakedown.

== Filmography ==
Television appearances
| Year | Title | Role | Notes |
|---|---|---|---|
| 2026 | Shakedown | Malisa Golightly | TV mini series |
| 2025 | Ghosts | Eileen | 8 Episodes |
| 2023 | Home and Away | Esther Lawrence/Margot Dafoe | 8 episodes |
| 2021 | Wakefield (TV series) | Linda Crowley | 8 episodes |
| 2020 | Halifax: Retribution | Minister Nolan | 2 episodes |
| 2018-19 | Squinters | Bridget | 12 episodes |
| 2019 | Bad Mothers | Maddie | 8 episodes |
| 2017-18 | True Story with Hamish & Andy | Linda / Rosemary | 2 episodes |
| 2014-17 | Love Child (TV series) | Matron Frances Bolton | 36 episodes |
| 2016 | Hyde & Seek | Jackie Walters | 8 episodes |
| 2016 | The Legend of Gavin Tanner | Raelene | 1 episode |
| 2015 | House of Hancock | Gina Rinehart | 2 episodes |
| 2013 | Paper Giants: Magazine Wars | Nene King | 2 episodes |
| 2012 | A Moody Christmas | Linda | 1 episode |
| 2012 | Howzat! Kerry Packer's War | Rose Mitchell | 2 episodes |
| 2011 | At Home with Julia | Newsreader | 1 episode |
| 2010-11 | Bed of Roses (TV series) | Tamara Denning | 3 episodes |
| 2005-08 | All Saints (TV series) | Corinne Davies / Natalie Haplin | 2 episodes |
| 2003-06 | Comedy Inc. (Australian TV series) | Various | 75 episodes |
| 2005 | The Alice | Cheryl Wilson | 1 episode |
| 2002-03 | MDA | Helena Lewis | 8 episodes |
| 2003 | Welcher & Welcher | Sonja Cohen | 2 episodes |
| 2002 | Stingers (TV series) | Norma McClyment | 1 episode |
| 2002 | Kath & Kim | Novelty Shop Assistant | 1 episode |
| 1999 | Water Rats (TV series) | Lisa Bell | 1 episode |
| 1996-99 | Blue Heelers | Vanessa Mackay / Deslee Arnold | 2 episodes |
| 1998 | Cody: The Wrong Stuff | Sarah | TV Movie |
| 1996 | Naked; Stories of Men | Kate | 1 episode |
| 1994 | Ship to Shore | Social Worker | 1 episode |

=== Film appearances ===
| Year | Title | Role | Notes |
|---|---|---|---|
| 2001 | The Bank | Diane | |
| 2002 | The Real Thing | Kylie | |
| 2003 | Ned Kelly (2003 film) | Jerildere Woman | |
| 2016 | Hiccup | Hiccuper | Short |
| 2018 | Sherbert Rozencrantz, You're Beautiful | Mum | Short |
| 2020 | Not A Walliflower | Mrs Thorn | Short |
| 2024 | Nugget is Dead | Aunty Ros | Feature film |

== Awards ==
McElhinney starred as Kerry Packer's down-trodden personal assistant, Rose in Channel Nine's TV mini-series Howzat! Kerry Packer's War for which she won the AACTA Award for Best Guest or Supporting Actress in a Television Drama and was nominated for the Logie Award for Most Outstanding Actress in a Series and as the new Editor-in-Chief of Packer's newly acquired Woman's Day magazine, Nene King, in series 2 of ABC1's Paper Giants mini-series Magazine Wars.
