= Daina Reid =

Australian director and actress

Daina Reid is an Australian director and actress who has been acting since the early 1990s. She began directing in 1999.

== Early life and education ==
Daina Reid graduated from the Western Australian Academy of Performing Arts acting course in 1990.

== Career ==
Reid performed in the TV comedy series Full Frontal from 1995 to 1997.

Her directing credits include the TV series Sunshine for Australian broadcaster SBS, The Secret River, INXS: Never Tear Us Apart, Paper Giants: The Birth of Cleo, and Howzat! Kerry Packer's War. She has also directed episodes of Miss Fisher's Murder Mysteries, Offspring, The Handmaids Tale, The Outsider, Space Force and Young Rock.

Reid directed of Hannah Kent’s psychological thriller feature film Run Rabbit Run, starring Sarah Snook, Damon Herriman and Greta Scacchi. released in Netflix in 2023.

== Recognition and awards ==
Reid was nominated for a 2019 Emmy Award for Outstanding Directing for a Drama Series for her work on The Handmaids Tale.

In 2017, Reid was the recipient of the Michael Carson Award "for excellence in the craft of television drama direction" at the Australian Directors' Guild (ADG) Awards.
