= Paper Giants: The Birth of Cleo =

2011 Australian TV series

- Opening titles
- Starring: Asher Keddie; Rob Carlton; Matt Day; Jessica Tovey
- Country of origin: Australia
- No. of episodes: 2

Production
- Running time: 90 minutes
- Production company: Southern Star Group

Original release
- Network: ABC1
- Release: 17 April – 18 April 2011

Paper Giants: The Birth of Cleo is a 2011 Australian two part television miniseries about the beginning of Cleo magazine and its creator, Ita Buttrose. The series stars Asher Keddie as Buttrose and Rob Carlton as Kerry Packer.

A miniseries sequel, titled Paper Giants: Magazine Wars was screened on ABC1 on 2 June, and 9 June 2013. It features Rachel Griffiths, Mandy McElhinney, Lucy Holmes, and Alexander England as a young James Packer.

== Plot ==
The series follows Buttrose as she creates the fashion magazine Cleo, as well the fashion and politics of the period.

== Cast ==
- Asher Keddie as Ita Buttrose
- Rob Carlton as Kerry Packer
- Matt Day as Daniel Ritchie
- Jessica Tovey as Leslie Carpenter
- Ian Meadows as Andrew Cowell
- Maeve Dermody as Rachel Carr
- Annie Maynard as Annie Woodham
- Tony Barry as Sir Frank Packer
- Cheree Cassidy as Ivana Holbrook
- Octavia Barron-Martin as Pat Nigra
- Olivia Pigeot as Rosina O’Casey
- Charlton Hill as Alan Nye
- Simon Lyndon as Jack Thompson
- Nathan Page as Alasdair 'Mac' MacDonald, Buttrose's husband
- Sahara Jones as Kate, Buttrose's daughter
- Toby Schmitz as Barry Humphries

== Reception ==
Reviews for the show were generally positive. The Sydney Morning Herald said:

Biopics rarely succeed. Invariably, they are thinly veiled hagiographies designed to push an "official" and pared-back version of history, dulled by performances that are merely impersonations. Thankfully, Paper Giants suffers no such problems.

Australian TV blog, TV Tonight rated the series with four stars out of five, and commented:

Whilst Keddie may not be a dead ringer for Buttrose she has the voice down pat: the tone is pitch perfect, complete with the slight Buttrose lisp (we would have expected nothing less). Keddie captures the inner strength of Buttrose, forging a path in a male-dominated world, navigating through pioneer publishing, inspiration and compromise.

The program was the subject of defamation proceedings brought against the ABC by the former husband of Buttrose, Alasdair Macdonald, who objected to how he was portrayed in the series. The action was settled out of court in April 2012 when the ABC apologised for what it agreed was an "untrue" portrayal of Macdonald.

== Awards and nominations ==
Award	Category	Subject	Result
AACTA Award	Best Telefeature, Mini Series or Short Run Series		Nominated
AACTA Award	Best Direction in Television	Daina Reid	Nominated
AACTA Award	Best Lead Actor in a Television Drama	Rob Carlton	Nominated
AACTA Award	Best Lead Actress in a Television Drama	Asher Keddie	Nominated
AACTA Award	Switched on Audience Choice Award – Best Performance in a Television Drama	Asher Keddie	Won
AACTA Award	Switched on Audience Choice Award – Best Television Program		Nominated
Logie Award	Most Outstanding Drama Series		Nominated
Logie Award	Most Outstanding Actor in a Series	Rob Carlton	Won
Logie Award	Most Outstanding Actress in a Series	Asher Keddie	Nominated
Logie Award	Most Popular Actress	Asher Keddie	Won

Christopher Lee also won a Queensland Premier's Literary Award in 2011 for his screenplay.

== Ratings ==
Part one of the miniseries rated over 1.2 million viewers nationally, ranking as the fifth most watched program of the night, and the eighth-most watched program of the week. Part two was watched by 1.346 million viewers in the main five Australian TV markets, ranking as the second-most watched program of the week and the most watched program of the night.

== Production ==
The miniseries was produced by John Edwards (Love My Way, Rush) and Karen Radzyner by Southern Star Entertainment in association with Screen NSW, Screen Australia and ABC TV. The executive producer was Carole Sklan, ABC TV head of fiction; and the script was written by Christopher Lee.
