= John Edwards (producer) =

Australian television drama producer

John Edwards AM
- Edwards in 2009
- Born: Robert John Edwards; 4 March 1953 (age 73); Manly, Sydney, New South Wales, Australia
- Occupation: Television producer

Robert John Edwards AM (born 4 March 1953) is an Australian television drama producer.

== Early life ==
Edwards grew up on the northern beaches of Sydney. His father was a car dealer.

Edwards was competent at school, and afterwards, he "drifted" through university and half-graduate degrees, before becoming a history teacher at both Swansea High School and Fairfield High School. After facing a personal glitch, he decided to explore the idea of working in television, and subsequently took leave from the education department.

== Career ==
Edwards landed a six week job at Film Australia doing preliminary research on 1982 telemovie The Weekly's War, a co-production for the Nine Network about seeing World War II through the eyes of the Women's Weekly. He ended up co-writing the show, which led to a couple of years of short term contracts followed by a paid apprenticeship at Film Australia, developing and writing films.

Deciding writing wasn't for him, Edwards decided to explore producing. He optioned a couple of books, which were made as low budget films, including 1985 thriller The Empty Beach, starring Bryan Brown (marking Edwards' producing debut), and 1985 children's film I Own the Racecourse.

Following this, Edwards won a Creative Producers Support Scheme award from the AFC and was mentored through the industry. He landed a producer role on the 1986 miniseries Cyclone Tracy, which proved a ratings hit. Off the back of its success, he produced the 1988 ABC series Stringer, for which the soundtrack (featuring Kate Ceberano and Wendy Matthews) went double platinum.

Edwards then took over an ABC pilot which became the series Police Rescue, starring Gary Sweet, Steve Bastoni and Steve Bisley. This facilitated the beginning of his long-running relationship with Southern Star. He followed this with the Cody telemovie series (1994–1995) and drama series Big Sky (1997–1999), reuniting with Gary Sweet for both. He also produced the Golden Globe-nominated miniseries On The Beach (2000), starring Armand Assante, Rachel Ward and Bryan Brown.

Edwards next found success with critically-acclaimed drama series The Secret Life of Us, starring Claudia Karvan, Deborah Mailman and Samuel Johnson, which ran for four seasons from 2001 to 2004. Off the back of the success of Secret Life, Edwards and Karvan secured a development deal for a series which became Love My Way. After it was knocked back by Network 10, the pair took it to Foxtel. The series, starring Karvan, Asher Keddie, Dan Wyllie, Brendan Cowell and Ben Mendelsohn, garnered numerous awards, including six Logies and eight AFI Awards. It ran for three seasons, from 2004 to 2007.

Following this, Edwards produced numerous drama series including Dangerous (2007) with Joel Edgerton, Out of the Blue (2008) and four seasons of police procedural series Rush (2008–2011), with Rodger Corser and Callan Mulvey. Further credits during this period included Tangle (2009–2012), starring Ben Mendelsohn, Justine Clarke and Catherine McClements, Spirited (2010–2011) and Puberty Blues (2012–2014) both with Karvan and Corser and Party Tricks (2014), featuring Corser and Keddie.

Edwards produced long-running comedy-drama series Offspring (2010–2017), starring Logie winner Asher Keddie as the lead character of Nina Proudman. He was instrumental in launching Keddie's career, after a guest role in The Secret Life of Us led to him cast her as Julia in Love My Way, followed by her role in Offspring. She then played the lead role of Ita Buttrose in his 2011 miniseries Paper Giants: The Birth of Cleo for the ABC.

During this time, Edwards also produced several other miniseries including Beaconsfield (2011), Howzat! Kerry Packer's War (2012), Power Games: The Packer–Murdoch War (2013), Gallipoli, The Beautiful Lie (2015), and Blue Murder: Killer Cop (2016).

In 2015, Edwards delivered the Hector Crawford Memorial Lecture, in which he opined that Australian television networks were playing it safe by commissioning only short eight-to-ten episode series. He also criticised television producers for the size of their budgets, stating that good results could be achieved with less finance.

That same year, Edwards parted ways with Endemol Shine Australia (previously known as the Southern Star Group) after 27 years of collaboration. The following year, he teamed with his son, former ITV Studios and Endemol executive Dan Edwards and Roadshow Films to form the production entity Roadshow Rough Diamond.

The first project produced under Roadshow Rough Diamond was the Logie-winning Stan series Romper Stomper, a television sequel to the 1992 film which starred Russell Crowe. This was followed by 2018 crime miniseries Australian Gangster, which was not able to screened until a later date, for legal reasons. and 2019 ten-part series Les Norton, based on the Les Norton novels by Robert G. Barrett and starring Rebel Wilson.

Edwards then reunited with Claudia Karvan for five seasons of comedy-drama series Bump from 2020 to 2025. Further credits include 2023 crime drama Human Error, starring Leeanna Walsman, Steve Peacocke and Matt Day, 2023 teen series Year Of and 2024 miniseries Plum, starring Brendan Cowell and Asher Keddie.

He executive produced Dan Edwards's Stan series The F Ward, starring Anna Friel, Ioane Sa'ula and Dan Wylie, and produced Dalliance for Paramount+, a romantic drama featuring Hugo Weaving, Heather Mitchell and Georgie Parker.

== Honours and awards ==
In all, Edwards' productions have won 31 Logie Awards, 30 Australian Film Institute Awards, 11 AACTA Awards, four People's Choice Awards (Australia), eight ASTRA Awards and more than a dozen Australian craft awards. Furthermore, On the Beach is the first Australian production to have received Golden Globe Award nominations.

In 2011, Edwards was conferred an Honorary master's degree by the Australian Film Television and Radio School, for "his 30-year contribution to Australian television." It was presented to him by Claudia Karvan.

In 2017, Edwards was appointed a Member of the Order of Australia for "significant service to the broadcast media industry as a television producer, and as a role model and mentor".

== Producer/writer credits ==
=== Film ===
Year	Title	Role	Notes	Ref.
1981	Australia in the 80's	Writer	Short film	
1983	Out of Time: Out of Place	Writer		
1985	The Empty Beach	Producer		
1990	Wendy Cracked a Walnut (aka Almost)	Producer		
1994	Police Rescue	Producer		

=== Television ===
Year	Title	Role	Type	Ref.
1982	The Weekly's War	Writer	Miniseries	
1983	The Entombed Warriors	Writer	Documentary	
1985	I Own the Racecourse	Producer, Writer	TV movie	
1986	Cyclone Tracy	Producer	Miniseries, 3 episodes	
1987	Stringer	Producer	Miniseries, 2 episodes	
1989–1996	Police Rescue	Producer	62 episodes	
1991	Children of the Dragon	Producer	Miniseries	
1993	Tribal Voice	Executive Producer	Documentary	
1994	Police Rescue	Story	TV movie	
1994–1996	Cody	Producer	6x TV movies	
1995	Echo Point	Producer	130 episodes	
1998	Big Sky	Producer	40 episodes	
2000	On the Beach	Producer	TV movie	
2001	Do or Die	Producer	Miniseries	
2001	Hard Knox	Producer	TV movie	
2001	The Secret Life of Us	Executive Producer	TV movie	
2001–2005	The Secret Life of Us	Producer / Executive Producer	66 episodes	
2003	Marking Time	Producer	Miniseries	
2003	Fireflies	Producer	TV movie	
2004	Fireflies	Producer	17 episodes	
2004	Rapid Response	Producer	TV movie	
2004–2007	Love My Way	Producer	27 episodes	
2005	The Surgeon	Producer	Miniseries, 8 episodes	
2005–2006	The Alice	Executive Producer	22 episodes	
2007	Dangerous	Producer	Miniseries, 7 episodes	
2008	Out of the Blue	Producer	114 episodes	
2008–2011	Rush	Producer	59 episodes	
2009–2012	Tangle	Producer	22 episodes	
2010–2011	Spirited	Producer / Executive Producer	18 episodes	
2010–2014	Offspring	Producer		
2011	Paper Giants: The Birth of Cleo	Producer	Miniseries, 2 episodes	
2011	Beaconsfield	Producer	TV movie	
2012	Howzat! Kerry Packer's War	Producer	Miniseries, 2 episodes	
2012–2013	Puberty Blues	Producer / Executive Producer	17 episodes	
2013	Power Games: The Packer–Murdoch War	Producer	Miniseries, 2 episodes	
2014	Party Tricks (aka Opposites Attract)	Producer	6 episodes	
2014–2015	Gallipoli	Producer	Miniseries, 7 episodes	
2015	The Beautiful Lie	Producer	Miniseries, 6 episodes	
2016	Blue Murder: Killer Cop	Producer / Executive Producer	Miniseries, 2 episodes	
2017	Romper Stomper	Producer (with Roadshow Rough Diamond)	Miniseries, 6 episodes	
2018	Australian Gangster	Producer (with Roadshow Rough Diamond)	Miniseries, 2 episodes (aired in 2021)	
2019	Les Norton	Producer (with Roadshow Rough Diamond)	10 episodes	
2020–2024	Bump	Producer / Executive Producer (with Roadshow Rough Diamond)	50 episodes	
2023	Human Error	Executive Producer / Producer (with Roadshow Rough Diamond)	Miniseries, 6 episodes	
2023–	Year Of	Producer / Executive Producer (with Roadshow Rough Diamond)	Miniseries	
2024	Plum	Producer (with Roadshow Rough Diamond)	6 episodes	
2025	A Bump Christmas	Producer (with Roadshow Rough Diamond)	TV movie	
2026	The F Ward	Producer	Miniseries, 6 episodes	
TBA	Dalliance	Executive Producer	Miniseries, 4 episodes (In production)	
