= Les Norton (TV series) =

2019 Australian television drama based on Robert G. Barret's fiction series

- Genre: Drama
- Based on: Les Norton by Robert G. Barrett
- Written by: Morgan O'Neill; Christopher Lee; Samantha Winston; Shanti Gudgeon; Malcolm Knox; Jessica Tuckwell
- Directed by: Jocelyn Moorhouse; Fadia Abboud; David Caesar; Morgan O'Neill
- Starring: Alexander Bertrand; David Wenham; Rebel Wilson
- Country of origin: Australia
- Original language: English

Production
- Executive producers: Sally Riley; Andrew Gregory; Morgan O'Neill; John Schwarz; Michael Schwarz; John Singleton; Jack Singleton
- Producers: Daniel Edwards; John Edwards
- Cinematography: Martin McGrath
- Running time: 45 minutes
- Production company: Roadshow Rough Diamond

Original release
- Network: ABC
- Release: 4 August – 6 October 2019

Les Norton is an Australian television drama series screened on ABC on 4 August 2019. It is adapted from a series of fiction books written by Australian author Robert G. Barrett and stars Alexander Bertrand as the protagonist, Les Norton.

== Synopsis ==
Les Norton is set in 1985 and follows the exploits of Les Norton, a country bloke from outback Queensland, on the run from a troubled past. He arrives in Sydney, where he lands a job as a bouncer at an illegal casino. While he is desperate to return home, he finds himself seduced by the city's illicit charms and is dragged into the web of underground crime.

== Cast ==
- Alexander Bertrand as Les Norton a new bouncer at an underground Sydney casino
- David Wenham as Price Galese, kingpin of the casino
- Rebel Wilson as Doreen, a brothel owner in the Western suburbs, and her identical twin sister Dolores Bognor
- Rhys Muldoon as The Minister, a politician who puts the 'C' in corruption
- Hunter Page-Lochard as Billy Dunne, a former pro boxer turned casino doorman
- Steve Le Marquand as Sgt Ray 'Thumper' Burell, a crooked cop
- Syd Zygier as Constable Emily Gold
- Pallavi Sharda as Georgie, the casino manager
- Justin Rosniak as Eddie Salita, a Vietnam veteran and Price's gun-for-hire
- Kate Box as Lauren 'Lozza' Johnson, a party girl advertising executive
- Susan Prior as Chenille
- Danny Adcock as Mousey
- Milly Alcock as Sian Galese
- Peter Phelps as Mick Matthews

== Production ==
Les Norton is produced by Daniel Edwards and John Edwards from Roadshow Rough Diamond. It has been created for television by Morgan O'Neill with writers Christopher Lee, Samantha Winston, Shanti Gudgeon, Malcolm Knox, and Jessica Tuckwell. It is directed by Jocelyn Moorhouse, Fadia Abboud, David Caesar, and Morgan O'Neill.

== Episodes ==
No. in season	Title	Directed by	Written by	Original release date	Aus. viewers
1	"You Wouldn't Be Dead For Quids"	Jocelyn Moorhouse	Morgan O'Neill	4 August 2019	695,000
2	"Wrongside"	Jocelyn Moorhouse	Morgan O'Neill	11 August 2019	581,000
3	"Bowen Lager"	David Caesar	Morgan O'Neill	18 August 2019	527,000
4	"The Boys from Binjiwunyawunya"	Fadia Abboud	Morgan O'Neill	25 August 2019	471,000
5	"Lobster Mobster"	David Caesar	Christopher Lee	1 September 2019	432,000
6	"Tight Arse"	Fabia Abboud	Morgan O'Neill & Malcolm Knox	8 September 2019	435,000
7	"The Real Thing"	Fabia Abboud	Shanti Gudgeon	15 September 2019	432,000
8	"Bush League"	David Caesar	Christopher Lee	22 September 2019	403,000
9	"Misery at the Selebo"	Morgan O'Neill	Jessica Tuckwell	29 September 2019	403,000
10	"Day of the Gecko"	Morgan O'Neill	Morgan O'Neill	6 October 2019	387,000
