= Alexander Bertrand =

Australian actor

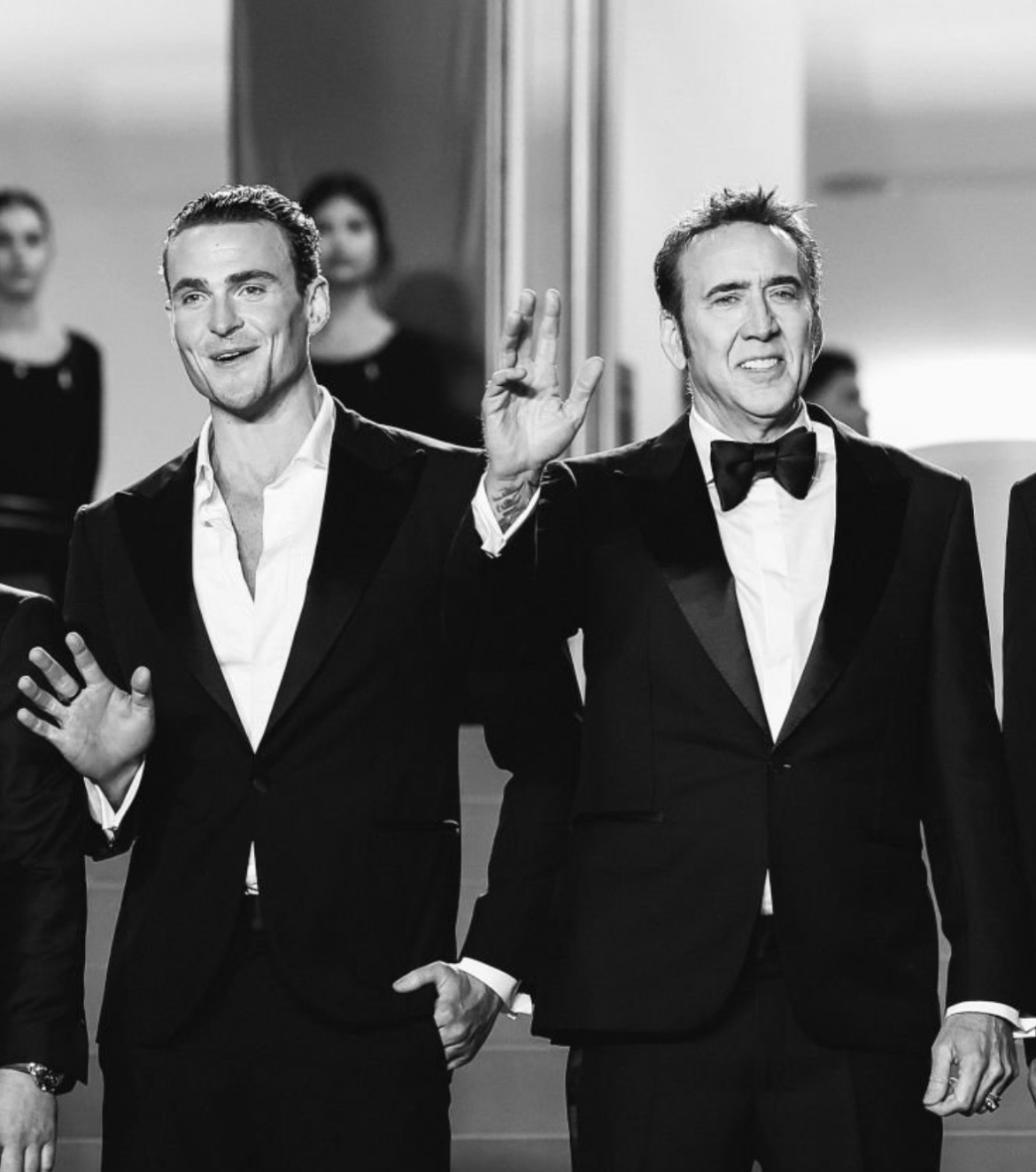
- Bertrand and Nicolas Cage at the 77th annual Cannes Film Festival
- Born: Sydney, Australia
- Occupation: Actor
- Years active: 2016–present
- Notable work: The Surfer; Australian Gangster; Suits LA; Les Norton; R.J. Decker

Alexander Bertrand is an Australian actor and filmmaker. He is most well known for leading roles in Les Norton, Australian Gangster and The Surfer with Nicolas Cage.

== Early life ==
Bertrand grew up by the beach in Manly, Sydney, Australia, and became an active surfer, waterman and fighter. He trained and fought in the martial art of Muay Thai professionally in Thailand. He worked as a nightclub host and doorman in Sydney's Kings Cross for several years before he joined the Australian Army as an infantryman. A knee injury cut his career short and he was medically discharged.

== Muay Thai Record ==
Bertrand fought as a Light Heavy Weight out of Dragon Muay Thai in Phuket from 2009-2010. His professional record out of Bangla stadium stands as 3 wins via KO/TKO, 0 draws and 1 Loss via TKO during the Light Heavyweight title fight at Bangla stadium in Phuket on March 26th, 2010. Bertrand lost via TKO in the 2nd round.

== Acting Career ==
In 2016 Bertrand first appeared on Australian television in Hyde & Seek for Channel 9 opposite Deborra-Lee Furness, The Warriors for ABC and the miniseries Home and Away: Revenge.

In 2018, Bertrand starred in the Australian national commercial campaign for Iron Jack beer.

In 2019, Bertrand was cast as the lead in ABC series Les Norton, based on the books of the same name, opposite Rebel Wilson and David Wenham, with directors including Jocelyn Moorehouse and David Caesar. Wenham stated: "I thought, well, this is going to obviously succeed or fail on the strength of who they cast in the lead role... In the very first read-through, I thought: 'Yep, he's got it – he's got the laconic, wry, slightly innocent delivery that Les should have. Yep, the perfect choice, and he's been a joy to work with."

Shortly thereafter, Bertrand joined the ensemble cast of Peter Duncan's Operation Buffalo (2019) starring James Cromwell for Netflix.

In 2021, with Bertrand in the lead role, the Village Roadshow limited series Australian Gangster (based on the life and death of Pasquale Barbaro, written and directed by Gregor Jordan) premiered on Channel 7. Journalist Luke Buckmaster stated: "If this frantically entertaining production were of a higher pedigree, his performance would be more obviously haunting and dramatic, perhaps even with flickers of greatness reminiscent of some of the finest portrayals of Australian criminals and ex-cons – such as Daniel P. Jones in Hail, Richard Green in Boxing Day and Eric Bana in Chopper".

In 2024 Bertrand was seen as 'Pitbull' in The Surfer opposite Nicolas Cage and Julian McMahon. The Surfer, directed by Lorcan Finnegan had its world premiere at The 77th Cannes Film Festival and received a 7 minute standing ovation.

In 2025 Bertrand was cast in the feature film dATE as Bruno Scarpa, directed by Scott Milam alongside Olivia Rose Keegan, Maddie Phillips and Dot Marie Jones. dATE had its world premiere during Screamfest 2026, at the TCL Chinese Theatre in Hollywood on the 11th of October 2026.

Other recent credits are, R.J. Decker and Suits LA.

== Filmography ==
=== Film ===
Year	Title	Role	Notes	Ref.
2024	The Surfer	Pitbull	Feature film	
2026	dATE	Bruno Scarpa	Completed	

=== Streaming/Television ===
Year	Title	Role	Notes	Ref.
2016	Hyde & Seek	Danny Tollis	Miniseries, 1 episode	
2016	Home and Away	Constable Weiss	1 episode	
2016	Home and Away: Revenge	Constable Weiss	TV movie	
2017	The Warriors	Roger	Miniseries, 2 episodes	
2019	Les Norton	Les Norton	Miniseries, 10 episodes	
2020	Operation Buffalo	Murphy	Miniseries, 6 episodes	
2021	Australian Gangster	Pasquale 'Pat' Barbaro	Miniseries, 2 episodes	
2025	NCIS	Frank Sobchek	1 episode	
2025	Suits LA	Vinnie Santoro	1 episode	
2025	S.W.A.T.	Gordon Pratt	1 episode	
2026	R.J. Decker	Levi Brenner	1 episode	
