= Kentex slipper factory fire =

Third deadliest fire in the Philippines (2015)

2015 Kentex factory fire
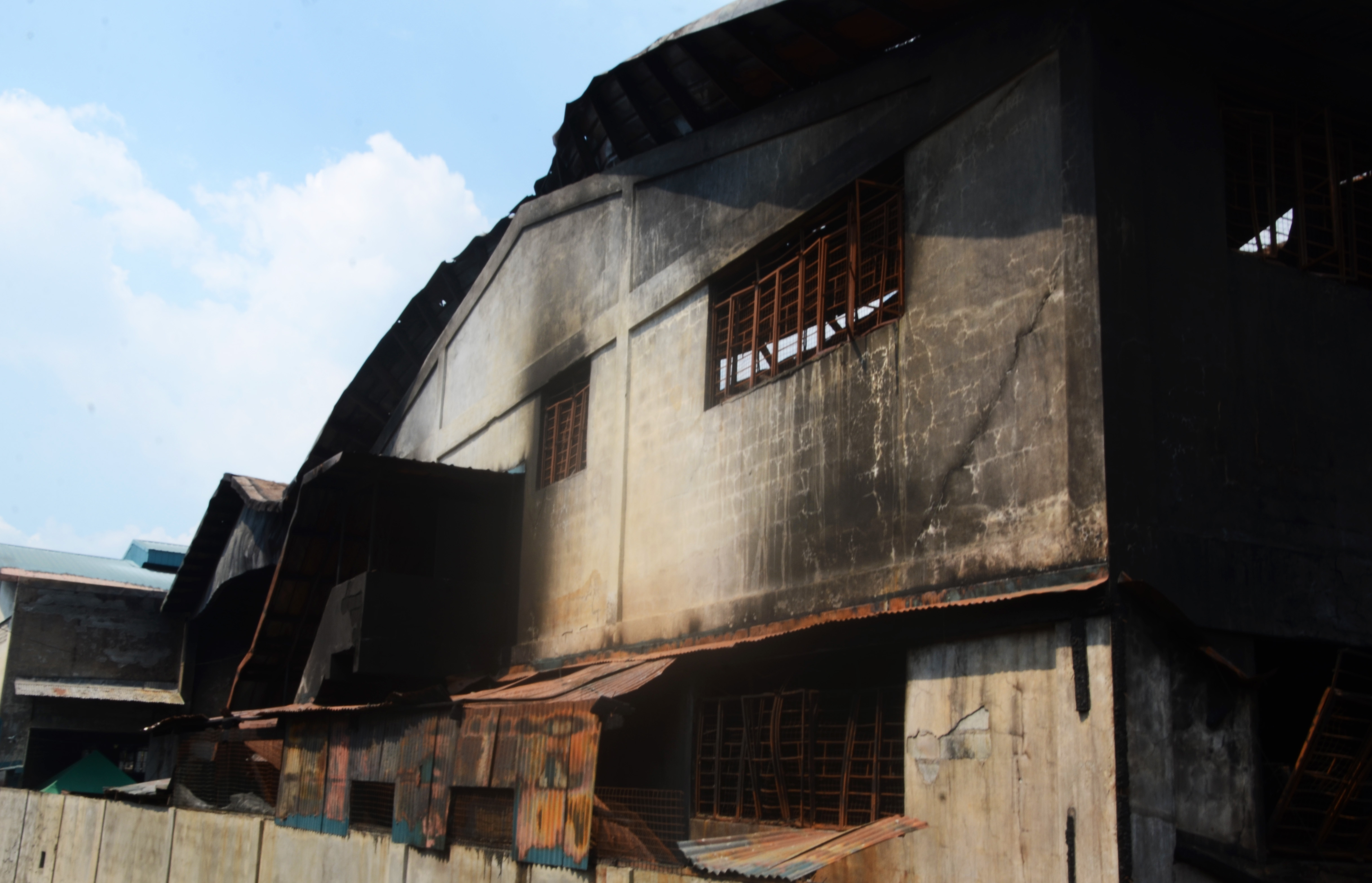
- The charred exterior of the Kentex factory as it stood three days after the fire
- Date: May 13, 2015
- Location: Valenzuela, Metro Manila, Philippines; 14.702453°N 121.013132°E
- Deaths: 74
- Tied as the second worst fire incident in Philippine history

On May 13, 2015, a fire broke out at the factory of Kentex Manufacturing Corporation in Valenzuela, Metro Manila, Philippines. 72 people were killed in the fire, making the incident the second-worst fire disaster in Philippine history alongside the Manor Hotel fire in August 2001; only the Ozone Disco Club fire in March 1996 had more deaths. (Note: If terrorist attacks would be included, the 2004 bombing of MV SuperFerry 14 – which killed 116 people – would be the second-deadliest fire in Philippine history.)

== Fire ==
Kentex is a small manufacturer of flip flops and other rubber shoes located in Valenzuela City, within Metro Manila, Philippines. It is one of many similar businesses serving the local market in a poor area of town.

On May 13, 2015, a fire broke out when welding sparks ignited chemicals stored near the entrance of the Kentex factory. It is possible, although unconfirmed, that welding works was being carried out on the doors of one of the main entrances to the building. Thick, black smoke engulfed the building as rubber and chemicals burned. The fire spread quickly and few people escaped. Unable to leave, trapped workers retreated to the second floor and attempted to call relatives for help.

It took five hours for the fire department to get the blaze under control. The fire left the building unstable, causing a delay in the retrieval of the dead while engineers secured the building.

== Aftermath ==
At least 72 people were killed in the fire, most of whom likely suffocated from smoke inhalation. Many bodies were badly burnt, "reduced to skulls and bones" in some cases, and 73 of the 74 bodies were found on the factory's second floor. The Barangay Maysan village hall was converted into a temporary morgue to store the dead.

On May 14, Valenzuela City fire chief Mel Jose Lagan and senior inspector Ed-Groover Oculam were placed on administrative leave as authorities investigated possible wrongdoing. Before the announcement, Lagan was adamant that firefighters had not been negligent, adding the arson unit would look into how workers were trapped and that there were sufficient exits.

Survivors of the blaze claimed the factory had sweatshop-like conditions and blamed the death toll on barred windows. The workers worked for "well below minimum wage" and endured foul odours, according to victims’ families and the Trade Union Congress of the Philippines. Salaries depended on the number of shoes produced, with pay as little as ₱300 (US$6.70) for a 12-hour workday, below the minimum wage ₱481. Other survivors said Kentex Manufacturing Corporation did not give them legally mandated social security and health insurance payments. A survivor who escaped the first floor remarked, "They were screaming for help, holding onto the bars. When we could no longer see their hands, we knew they had died ... they died because they were trapped on the second floor." Another survivor remarked, "We were running not knowing exactly where to go ... if people had known what to do, it would have been different."

Philippine National Police acting chief Leonardo Espina said, "Someone will definitely be charged because of the deaths.". Interior Secretary Mar Roxas promised justice for the victims, saying he was angered by the apparent cause (welding near flammable materials) and insufficient exits in the factory. Initial investigations indicated that the factory had no sprinklers and the building was overcrowded during work hours. The factory workers had apparently received no safety training, and a substantial portion of the workforce had been recruited by an illegal subcontractor.

A September 2014 government assessment found Kentex Manufacturing Corporation compliant with safety requirements. According to the Department of Labor and Employment, the company had an established safety committee.

On 17 May, the welder whose activity caused the fire sought police protection, claiming he was receiving death threats. He said he had been working on the factory's roll-up door where deliveries were received, including flammable chemicals. The chemicals were stored near the delivery point and were ignited by a stray spark from the welding. A statement from Labor Secretary Rosalinda Baldoz the same day said that charges were likely to be filed against Kentex owners, and the inspectors who approved the factory's fire safety would also be probed.

In early March 2016, the Office of the Ombudsman ordered the dismissal of Valenzuela City Mayor Rex Gatchalian and six more city and fire officials for grave misconduct and gross neglect of duty in connection with the factory fire. The Ombudsman said that Gatchalian, Padayao, Carreon, and Avendan were liable for issuing business permits to Kentex in 2015 despite its delinquent status. Gatchalian subsequently secured a temporary restraining order from the Court of Appeals against the dismissal order. He also said that the order would have a chilling effect on mayors from highly urbanized cities who issue provisional business permits to establishments.

The buildings were subsequently demolished, and as of January 2026, the former site of Kentex Manufacturing Corporation remains vacant.

== In popular culture ==
The 2022 film Nocebo loosely bases its subplot on the fire. The end credits contain the statement "JUSTICE FOR ALL KENTEX WORKERS" after mentioning the credits for its ending track Pugon by The General Strike, which also references the fire.

== See also ==
- List of fires
- Ozone Disco Club fire – the deadliest fire disaster in the Philippines
