= Australian Gangster =

- DVD cover
- Genre: Crime; Drama
- Written by: Gregor Jordan
- Directed by: Gregor Jordan; Fadia Abboud
- Composer: Richard Pike
- Country of origin: Australia
- Original language: English
- No. of episodes: 2

Production
- Executive producers: Julie McGauran; Chris Chard
- Producers: Dan Edwards; John Edwards; Gregor Jordan
- Cinematography: Garry Phillips
- Editors: Adam Wills; Katrina Barker
- Production company: Roadshow Rough Diamond

Original release
- Network: Seven Network
- Release: 13 September – 14 September 2021

Australian Gangster is an Australian television miniseries, produced by the Seven Network, which premiered on 13 September 2021. The miniseries is directed by Gregor Jordan and Fadia Abboud and produced by Dan Edwards, John Edwards and Gregor Jordan for Roadshow Rough Diamond.

== Production ==
The series was announced by Seven at their annual upfronts in October 2017 and was originally meant to air sometime in 2018, however due to pending legal cases of some of the characters being depicted, the series was delayed until the cases had closed. After two years without any information regarding the series, on 21 October 2020, Seven announced at their annual upfronts that the series would finally air sometime in 2021.

== Synopsis ==
Drug dealer, gangster, gym-junky, Lamborghini driver, husband, father, Australian Gangster is a four hour TV series about the life and death of a new breed of Sydney criminal. The kind that doesn't care about playing it safe or keeping a low profile or even getting caught. Our main character is emblematic of the type of modern gangster that only really cares about looking good on Instagram, making a name for himself in a new, wannabe glamorous crime scene, while at the same time trying to manage the pressures of family life.

== Cast ==
- Alexander Bertrand as Pasquale 'Pat' Barbaro
- Peter Gonis
- Louisa Mignone as Melinda, Barbaro's wife
- Michael Vice
- Rahel Romahn as Mohammed 'Little Crazy' Hamzy, Brothers for Life member
- Zachary Garred
- Karla Tonkich
- Ishak Issa
- Steve Bastoni as Joe Barbaro
- Simon Palomares
- Joseph Fala
- Federico Gazzilli
- Marie Shanahan
- Moodi Dennaoui
- Michael Beckley as Locksmith
- David Paulsen

== Reception ==
=== Viewership ===
The first part had an average rating of 359,000 viewers, and the second part has an average rating of 340,000.
