= Manor Hotel fire =

2001 hotel fire in Quezon City, Philippines

- Date: August 18, 2001
- Time: 4:00 – 6:30 a.m. (UTC+08:00)
- Location: Kamias Road, West Kamias, Quezon City, Philippines; 14°38′03.7″N 121°03′27.3″E
- Type: Fire
- Deaths: 74 (Note: The initial tally was reported to be 75 deaths. However the Quezon City government on August 20 clarified that the tally only records 70 deaths resulting from the fire. By August 24, the tally increased to 73 deaths. However, reports from 2019 state that the final death toll from the fire stood at 74.)

The Manor Hotel fire was a fire at the Manor Hotel in Quezon City, Metro Manila, Philippines on August 18, 2001. With a death toll of 74, it is considered to be the second worst structural fire in Philippine history, tied with the Kentex slipper factory fire in 2015, and only behind the Ozone Disco fire in 1996. (Note: If terrorist attacks would be included, the 2004 bombing of MV SuperFerry 14 – which killed 116 people – would be the second-deadliest fire in Philippine history.)

== Building ==
The Manor Hotel occupied a six-storey concrete building along Kamias Road in Quezon City, Metro Manila. According to local authorities, it was built around the late 1970s and could have been previously affected by an earlier fire. At the time of the fire, the building had no windows at the rear and other windows were blocked by white iron bars, which were a common anti-burglary feature. Its fire exits were also obstructed. The first two floors from the ground were used as office spaces.

== Fire ==
The Manor Hotel fire occurred on August 18, 2001, at around 4 am. A security guard at an adjacent building fired three warning shots after he saw smoke coming out of an exhaust fan from the Manor Hotel at 3:50 am after which he heard an explosion. At that time, there were 236 registered guests, 172 of whom were participants of the three-day Destiny Conference Crusade by the Don Clowers Ministries, an American evangelical group from Irving, Texas.

The third and fourth floors were the only part of the Manor Hotel building directly affected by fire, but smoke reached the upper floors, which also led to fatalities. According to Quezon City Mayor Feliciano Belmonte Jr., the fire may have started in a restaurant and karaoke bar on the third floor. Initial reports also suggest it may have started from the overheating of an air-conditioning unit. An alternative theory suggested that there was a short circuit in the ceiling of a third floor stockroom.

Firefighters attempted to save trapped occupants by sawing the iron bars of the hotel room's windows. Many of the guests huddled in their bathrooms, with two jumping from the building and surviving.

The fire was put out at around 6:30 am.

== Victims ==
74 people were killed in the incident, of which 62 died on site. At least one body was found charred, but investigators concluded most victims died due to asphyxiation or smoke inhalation. No American delegates to the Destiny Conference Crusade were among the casualties, as all victims were Filipino nationals. The injured were rushed to different nearby hospitals: East Avenue Medical Center, Quirino Memorial Medical Center, Lung Center of the Philippines, Quezon City Medical Center, Quezon City General Hospital, and Victoriano Luna General Hospital.

== Aftermath ==
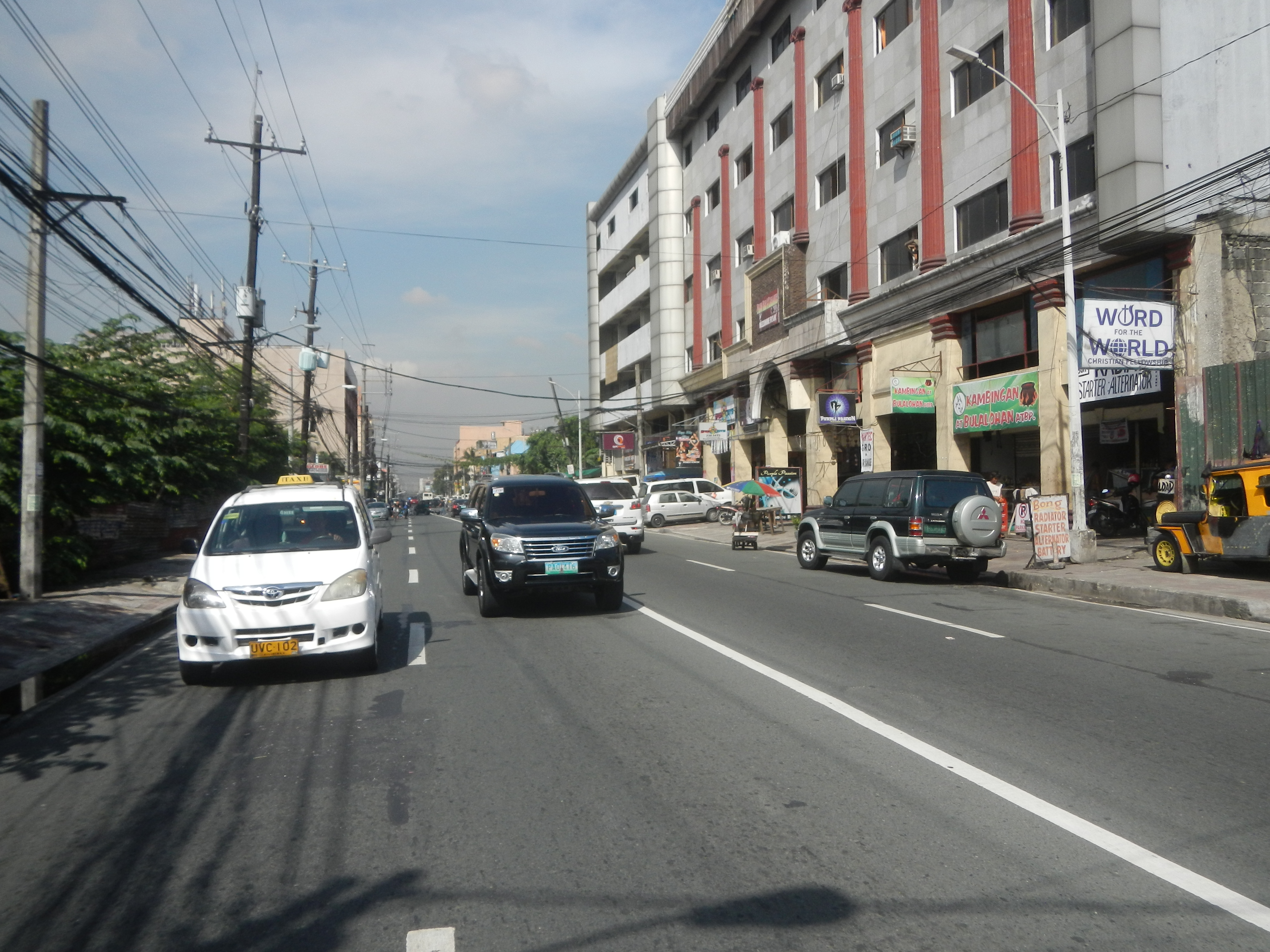
The former Manor Hotel building (right) along Kamias Avenue, 2016

External videos
- Memorial Mass for victims of the Manor Hotel fire
- Philippines Memorial from the Associated Press Archive

The Manor Hotel fire is the deadliest hotel fire in Philippine history, and the country's second-worst fire of any kind after the Ozone Disco fire in March 1996, which killed 162. The Destiny Conference Crusade, attended by 8,000 people at the Araneta Coliseum, dedicated their August 18 service to victims and their families. President Gloria Macapagal Arroyo ordered an investigation of the fire and personally visited survivors.

Quezon City fire marshal Ricardo Lemence was removed from his position by Interior Secretary Joey Lina shortly after the fire. Charges were meanwhile filed against multiple Manor Hotel and Quezon City government officials.

=== 2019 convictions ===
Four Quezon City government officials and five Manor Hotel officers were convicted of charges in relation to the 2001 fire on March 29, 2019, by the Sandiganbayan's Seventh Division. The decision was upheld on September 3, 2019. The following were charged:

Person	Position	Conviction	Sentence	Notes
Alfredo Macapugay	Quezon City Building Official	Three counts of graft	Imprisonment of six years and one month up to ten years for each count; Perpetual disqualification from holding public office	For allowing the hotel to operate without the necessary permits. The two were found to have allowed the hotel to accept guests despite receiving a recommendation by the Bureau of Fire Protection to close the establishment for violating the National Building Code and the Fire Code of the Philippines.
Romeo Montallana	Quezon City Electrical Division Chief	Three counts of graft	Imprisonment of six years and one month up to ten years for each count; Perpetual disqualification from holding public office	For allowing the hotel to operate without the necessary permits. The two were found to have allowed the hotel to accept guests despite receiving a recommendation by the Bureau of Fire Protection to close the establishment for violating the National Building Code and the Fire Code of the Philippines.
Romualdo Santos	City Engineer V	Two counts of graft	Imprisonment of six years and one month up to ten years for each count	
Gerardo Villasenor	Electrical Inspector	Two counts of graft	Imprisonment of six years and one month up to ten years for each count	
William Genato	Manor Hotel owner	Two counts of graft	Imprisonment of six years and one month up to ten years for each count	
Rebecca Genato	Manor Hotel president	Two counts of graft	Imprisonment of six years and one month up to ten years for each count	
Marion Fernandez	Manor Hotel incorporator	Two counts of graft	Imprisonment of six years and one month up to ten years for each count	
Dionisio Arengino	Manor Hotel incorporator	Two counts of graft	Imprisonment of six years and one month up to ten years for each count	
Candelaria Arandor	Manor Hotel manager	Two counts of graft	Imprisonment of six years and one month up to ten years for each count	
