= The Surfer (2024 film) =

Film by Lorcan Finnegan

- Australian theatrical release poster
- Directed by: Lorcan Finnegan
- Written by: Thomas Martin
- Produced by: Leonora Darby; James Harris; Robert Connolly; James Grandison; Brunella Cocchiglia; Nicolas Cage; Nathan Klingher
- Starring: Nicolas Cage; Julian McMahon; Nic Cassim; Miranda Tapsell; Alexander Bertrand; Justin Rosniak
- Cinematography: Radek Ładczuk
- Edited by: Tony Cranstoun
- Music by: François Tétaz
- Production companies: Saturn Films; Arenamedia; Lovely Productions; Tea Shop Productions
- Distributed by: Madman Films; Stan (Australia); Vertigo Releasing (Ireland and United Kingdom)
- Release dates: 18 May 2024 (Cannes); 9 May 2025 (Ireland); 15 May 2025 (Australia)
- Running time: 100 minutes
- Countries: Australia; Ireland
- Language: English
- Box office: $2.1 million

The Surfer is a 2024 Australian psychological thriller film directed by Lorcan Finnegan, written by Thomas Martin, and starring Nicolas Cage. It follows a man who plans to surf at an idyllic beach with his son, but is thwarted and tormented by the locals.

The Surfer had its world premiere in the Midnight Screenings section at the 77th Cannes Film Festival on 18 May 2024. The film was theatrically released in the United States on 2 May 2025, before releasing in Ireland and the United Kingdom on 9 May, and then in Australia on 15 May, where it was released on Australian streaming service Stan on 15 June.

== Plot ==
The Surfer drives his teen son to Luna Bay to surf, hoping to show his son the house above the beach, which he is desperately trying to purchase. It used to be his father's, and it is where he grew up surfing before his father's untimely death. They however are rudely turned away by a gang of surfing localists led by Scally, a self-styled surf guru determined to protect the beach from non-residents. The Surfer disappointedly returns his son to his mother and returns to the Luna Bay parking lot.

Desperate to close the deal on the house before Christmas, the Surfer continually needles his real estate agent in an attempt to scrape up the over million dollars needed to outbid another buyer. A colleague at the Surfer's investment firm calls to let him know he needs to return to work soon to sort out an issue. His estranged wife also calls to say that she is engaged and having a baby, crushing his hopes of reuniting his family at the beach house, where he wants his son to be able to surf as he did. The Surfer's ex-wife, like the agent, suggests he give up his obsession with the beach house. The Surfer observes the Bum, who is living in his broken-down station wagon in the parking lot and is being harassed by the beach boys. The Bum tells the Surfer that Scally murdered his award-winning surfer son and killed his dog.

That evening, the Surfer's surfboard goes missing. He goes down to the gang’s beach retreat to demand his board back, but is forced to leave after defeating one of the surfers in a fight. He calls the police and an officer arrives in the morning, but the Surfer becomes dejected when the officer turns out to be another disciple of Scally's, demanding the Surfer leave and not cause more trouble.

A photographer helps the Surfer jump-start his car and, in return, takes photos of him. When his phone dies, it becomes impossible for him to use the credit on his phone to purchase food from the parking lot food hut. In return for charging his phone and a cup of coffee, the owner insists that the Surfer leave his father's watch as collateral. After the Surfer's shoes and suit coat go missing in the bathroom, he sees the food cart has closed for the day, leaving him without food, water, his phone, or his watch.

While trying unsuccessfully to steal his surfboard back, the Surfer observes the gang initiating a new adherent, who is branded. The Surfer is chased off the beach, his car is vandalized, and he is forced to hide through the night in the underbrush. In the morning, his Lexus is gone. Delusional from heat, sun, and lack of sustenance, and filthy, bloodied, and barefoot, he wanders the parking lot, imploring beach-goers to lend him their phone so he can secure funding for the house. He is intermittently accosted by visions of a man, dead in the surf, and the harshness of desert spiders and birds.

The Surfer runs into his real estate agent, who assumes him to be a vagrant and says he’s never seen him before in his life. Additionally, the policeman returns and laughs at the notion that his Lexus was stolen, telling him that his vehicle is actually the broken-down station wagon. He begins living in the station wagon, taking a shark-tooth necklace from the car, which the Bum had insisted his own son had won in a surfing competition before he was killed by Scally. The Surfer picks through the garbage to find food, drinks fetid water, and eventually tries to eat a rat he has killed. All the while, he has visions of people laughing at him.

The photographer returns and shows the Surfer a picture she took earlier of him in his suit in front of his car, proving to him that he actually does have a Lexus and a job. Enraged, he goes to the beach, nearly drowning the beach bully, Pitbull. After patching the Surfer up, Scally then reveals that the entire experience was a test to ensure that the Surfer was worthy of buying the house for his family and becoming one of them. To finally ensure that he can be trusted, Scally forces the Surfer to burn the station wagon, while his son shows up on his bike and the Lexus is in parking lot.

Finally allowed to surf, the Surfer, the Kid, Scally, and his gang all return to the beach, only to be stopped by the Bum, who has returned with a gun. The Surfer is able to convince the Bum to let him and the Kid surf by returning the Bum's shark-tooth necklace. As the Surfer and the Kid paddle out, the Bum executes Scally and then kills himself, lying in the surf just as the Surfer's father had.

== Cast ==
- Nicolas Cage as the Surfer
- Julian McMahon as Scally
- Nic Cassim as the Bum
- Miranda Tapsell as the Photographer
- Alexander Bertrand as Pitbull
- Justin Rosniak as the Cop
- Finn Little as the Kid
- Rahel Romahn as the Estate Agent
- Charlotte Maggi as Jenny
- Nina Young as the Dog Walker

== Production ==
The Surfer was inspired by the Lunada Bay Boys.

It was written by Thomas Martin and directed by Lorcan Finnegan. The film is an Australian and Irish co-production. It was produced by Tea Shop Productions, Arenamedia, Lovely Productions, and Gramercy Park Media, with financial support from Australia's Screenwest.

Nicolas Cage's casting in the film was announced in May 2023. It was Julian McMahon's final film role before his death months after its release in 2025.

In October and November 2023, Cage was filming scenes in Yallingup. Principal photography concluded in December 2023.

The score was composed by François Tétaz.

== Release ==
The Surfer had its world premiere in the Midnight Screenings section at the 77th Cannes Film Festival on 18 May 2024. It was also featured in the Limelight section of the 54th International Film Festival Rotterdam on 31 January 2025. The film was theatrically released in the United States by Roadside Attractions and Lionsgate on 2 May 2025. In Ireland and the United Kingdom, the film was released by Vertigo Releasing on 9 May. It was then theatrically released in Australia by Madman Films on 15 May, before releasing on Australian streaming service Stan on 15 June.

== Reception ==
On the review aggregator website Rotten Tomatoes, 84% of 174 critics' reviews are positive, with an average rating of 6.8/10. The website's consensus reads: "Nicolas Cage expertly rides the waves of toxic masculinity in this sand filled arena of torment." Metacritic, which uses a weighted average, assigned the film a score of 67 out of 100, based on 29 critics, indicating "generally favorable" reviews.

Josh Slater-Williams of IndieWire graded the film a B−. Xan Brooks of The Guardian awarded the film four stars out of five, calling the film "a gloriously demented B-movie thriller."

== Awards ==
At the 2025 ARIA Music Awards, the soundtrack, composed by François Tétaz, was nominated for ARIA Award for Best Original Soundtrack, Cast or Show Album. At the 15th Australian Academy of Cinema and Television Arts Awards, the film received eight nominations including Best Film, with Julian McMahon posthumously being awarded Best Supporting Actor.

== See also ==
- Surf culture
