= The Warriors (TV series) =

- Genre: Comedy drama
- Created by: Tony Briggs; Robert Connolly
- Written by: Jon Bell; Tony Briggs; Tracey Rigney
- Directed by: Adrian Russell Wills; Beck Cole; Catriona McKenzie; Steven McGregor
- Starring: Gordan Churchill; Reece Milne; Nelson Baker; Ben Knight; John Howard; Vince Colosimo; Lisa McCune
- Composer: Daniel Rankine
- Country of origin: Australia
- Original language: English
- No. of seasons: 1
- No. of episodes: 8 (list of episodes)

Production
- Executive producers: Robert Connolly; Tony Briggs; Sally Riley; Jon Bell; Penny Smallacombe
- Producers: Robert Connolly; John Harvey; Liz Kearney
- Production location: Melbourne
- Cinematography: John Brawley
- Editor: Denise Haratzis
- Running time: 30 minutes
- Production company: Arenamedia

Original release
- Network: ABC
- Release: 12 April – 31 May 2017

The Warriors is an eight-part Australian television comedy-drama series that premiered on ABC on 12 April 2017, created by Tony Briggs and Robert Connolly.

== Plot ==
The series explores the elite world of professional sport through the eyes of recruits and established players living in a share house.

== Cast ==
=== Main ===
- Gordan Churchill as Maki Birrawuy, the number one draft pick
- Reece Milne as Doc Shepherd, the team-captain
- Nelson Baker as Zane Phillips
- Ben Knight as Scottie Watson
- John Howard as Bill Shepherd, club president and Doc's father
- Vince Colosimo as Coach Mark 'Spinner' Spinotti
- Lisa McCune as Deb Van Exel, communications manager

=== Recurring ===
- Kaden Hartcher as Meat
- Jeff Gobbels as Anchor
- Dan Haberfield as Boydy
- Alexander Bertrand as Roger

=== Guests ===
- Brett Swain as Hutton
- Kate Lister as Jessica
- Nicky Winmar as himself
- Peter Bedford as himself

== Production ==
The eight-part series was created by Tony Briggs and Robert Connolly. It explores the elite world of professional sport through the eyes of recruits and established players living in a share house.

The series was written by Jon Bell, Tony Briggs, and Tracey Rigney. It was directed by Adrian Russell Wills, Beck Cole, Steven McGregor, and Catriona McKenzie. It was produced by Arenamedia with John Harvey.

== Release ==
The series premiered on ABC on 12 April 2017.

== Episodes ==
No.	Title	Directed by	Written by	Original release date	Australia viewers (thousands)
1	"A Grand Tradition"	Adrian Russell Wills	Jon Bell	12 April 2017	217,000
Team captain, Doc, and his three Aussie Rules rookies, Maki, Zane & Scottie, have a limited amount of time to make it to the MCG for a huge announcement for their team. When they arrive, Doc gets them lost inside the stadium, and they have to get a way out before the event ends.
2	"Racist for Love"	Adrian Russell Wills	Jon Bell	19 April 2017	N/A
After Maki makes a fantastic mark at training, an online journalist accuses him of faking it. When Scottie, Zane and Doc hear about what happened, they make a plan for revenge to get back at the journalist.
3	"Blooding"	Beck Cole	Tracey Rigney	26 April 2017	250,000
Bill takes the rookies to the Onion Ring gym to try and make them tougher after becoming angry of Spinner's training methods. When Maki decides nit to join in, Zane gets mad at him and tensions arise in their friendship.
4	"Mind Over Matter"	Beck Cole	Tony Briggs	3 May 2017	153,000
Zane starts having trouble of kicking the ball with accuracy and Spinner tells him his position in the team may become in jeopardy. Scottie, Doc and Maki find out and they try to make him feel better and take him on a wild night out.
5	"The Last Call"	Steven McGregor	Tracey Rigney	10 May 2017	158,000
Doc gets caught in a scandal which leads to the team losing their sponsorship. Bill reaches out to Fast Freddy to become a sponsor, he agrees but wants to receive information about upcoming games. Doc refuses to be involved so Bill makes Maki instead.
6	"I Wanna Dance"	Steven McGregor	Jon Bell	17 May 2017	195,000
During a training session, Maki is racially vilified. Zane, who has experienced racism all his life, tries to make Maki forget what had happened, but after deciding this is not the best thing to do, Zane decides to take a stand for Maki.
7	"The Magic of Gija"	Catriona McKenzie	Tony Briggs	24 May 2017	204,000
Maki makes the decision to leave the team and return to his hometown. Zane, Scottie & Doc decide to take a trip to his hometown to bring him back to Melbourne and the team but find it hard to do so when they arrive.
8	"Fucken Footballers"	Catriona McKenzie	Jon Bell	31 May 2017	127,000
The first game of the season is nearly here, but when Scottie is named starting ruckman, he decides to takes steroids to make his knee heal faster. However, when a random drug test is announced, Zane takes him to his cousin who has a way of helping him pass the test.
