= Fearless (British TV series) =

British crime thriller television drama series

- Genre: Crime thriller
- Created by: Patrick Harbinson
- Written by: Patrick Harbinson
- Directed by: Pete Travis
- Creative director: Rebecca Keane
- Starring: Helen McCrory; Wunmi Mosaku; Jonathan Forbes; Sam Swainsbury; John Bishop; Jack Shepherd; Kika Markham; Rick Warden; Alec Newman; Rebecca Callard; Allan Corduner; Jemima Rooper; Robin Weigert; Michael Gambon; Jamie Bamber; Emma Hamilton
- Opening theme: Back from the Fire by Gold Brother
- Country of origin: United Kingdom
- Original language: English
- No. of series: 1
- No. of episodes: 6

Production
- Executive producers: Patrick Harbinson; Damien Timmer; Tom Mullens
- Producer: Adrian Sturges
- Production locations: London, England
- Editors: Matt Platt-Mills; Sigvaldi J. Karason; Malcolm Crowe
- Running time: 45 minutes
- Production company: Mammoth Screen

Original release
- Network: ITV
- Release: 12 June – 17 July 2017

Fearless is a six-part British crime thriller television drama series created by screenwriter Patrick Harbinson and broadcast on ITV in 2017. The series follows human-rights lawyer Emma Banville (Helen McCrory) as she tries to prove convicted murderer Kevin Russell innocent of the murder of schoolgirl Linda Simms 14 years earlier. Russell asserts that he is innocent of the crime, and Emma believes that his conviction was a miscarriage of justice. She goes to extreme lengths to discover the truth.

Supporting cast includes Michael Gambon as influential former Deputy Secretary to the Cabinet Office Sir Alastair McKinnon, Jonathan Forbes as Emma's colleague Dominic Truelove, Wunmi Mosaku as DCS Olivia Greenwood, the Investigating Officer on the Linda Simms case, and John Bishop as Emma's boyfriend Steve Livesey.

Filming for the series began in September 2016 in London and East Anglia. The series debuted on ITV in the UK on 12 June 2017 and has received positive reviews, with critics praising Helen McCrory's performance. The show was cancelled in March 2018 after one series.

== Cast ==
=== Main cast ===
- Helen McCrory as Emma Banville, an experienced human rights lawyer
- Jonathan Forbes as Dominic Truelove, a former police officer and Banville's legal assistant
- Sam Swainsbury as Kevin Russell, a 37-year-old man who insists he was wrongly imprisoned for 14 years for the murder of Linda Simms
- Rebecca Callard as Annie Peterson, Kevin's former fiancée and the mother of his son
- Wunmi Mosaku as DCS Olivia Greenwood, a Counter Terrorism Command officer who previously led the Simms murder investigation
- Robin Weigert as Heather Myles, a Central Intelligence Agency operative
- John Bishop as Steve Livesey, Banville's photographer boyfriend
- Jamie Bamber as Matthew Wild MP, a young politician and former soldier who later becomes Leader of the Opposition
- Emma Hamilton as Laura Wild, wife of Matthew Wild
- Michael Gambon as Sir Alastair McKinnon, the former Deputy Secretary to the Cabinet under Prime Minister Tony Blair.

=== Supporting cast ===
- Eve Austin as Linda Simms, the 15-year-old girl murdered in 2003
- Rick Warden as Charlie Simms, father of Linda
- Cathy Murphy as Beth Simms, mother of Linda
- Ben Cartwright as Phil Simms, uncle of Linda
- Jack Hollington as Jason, the 14-year-old son of Kevin Russell and Annie Peterson
- Christine Bottomley as DS Jenna Brooks, a Counter Terrorism Command officer
- Karima McAdams as Miriam Attar, Syrian wife of a suspected terrorist and friend of Banville
- Alec Newman as Tony Pullings, a photojournalist
- Allan Corduner as Monty Berman
- Jemima Rooper as Maggie Berman
- Brendan Patricks as DCI Nicholas Staines, a Metropolitan Police Service detective
- Armin Karima as Imran
- Colin Stinton as Jack Kretchmer, the former US Under Secretary of Defense under President George W. Bush
- Catherine Steadman as Karen Buxton
- Dhaffer L'Abidine as Dr. Yusef Attar, one of Banville's clients suspected of having ties to ISIS
- Tim McMullan as David Nolenn
- Pandora Clifford as Nicola Osborne
- Jack Shepherd as Arthur Banville, Emma's terminally ill father
- Kika Markham as Eleanor Banville, Emma's mother
- James Thorne as Derek Peterson, Annie's husband and Jason's stepfather
- Sam Crane as Luke
- Sammy Winward as Siobhan Murphy
- Corey Johnson as Larry Arlman, an American private investigator used by Banville and her colleagues
- Jonah Lotan as Logan Bradley, a member of the United States Air Force

== Episodes ==
| No. | Title | Directed by | Written by | Original release date | UK viewers (millions) |
|---|---|---|---|---|---|
| 1 | "Episode 1" | Pete Travis | Patrick Harbinson | 12 June 2017 | 7.16 |
After being contacted by his ex-fiancée Annie Peterson, human rights lawyer Emma Banville takes up the case of convicted killer Kevin Russell, who is serving a life sentence for the murder of Linda Simms, 15, who had been assaulted and buried alive at the school where Kevin was working as a janitor at the time of her death in February 2003. The audio tape of his confession and a visit to the school where Linda's body was found leads Emma to suspect Kevin was wrongfully convicted. Linda's grieving parents alert the press in an attempt to change Emma's mind, leading to Kevin's family being harassed and him being assaulted in prison. Emma successfully gets his conviction thrown out on the basis of a clearly coerced confession, but he will be tried a second time. Emma faces the wrath of the original investigator, Olivia Greenwood, who plans to introduce new evidence of his guilt. Events in Emma's personal life fail to make the case any easier. While taking care of a Syrian refugee and her baby, Emma prepares to adopt a child with her boyfriend, Steve, all while dealing with negative headlines and comforting her terminally ill father, Arthur.
| 2 | "Episode 2" | Pete Travis | Patrick Harbinson | 19 June 2017 | 4.92 |
Kevin is forced to move in with Emma after he is released on bail, as even his own 14-year-old son, Jason, believes he is guilty. Ambitious young MP Matthew Wild, who knows Linda's family, refuses to appeal to them to approve the request for their daughter's body to be exhumed. Emma receives provocative photos of Linda Simms taken at Kevin's former janitor shed. The photos, professionally taken by photojournalist Tony Pullings, include one of Linda in only her bra wearing an F-14 badge. This plus the forensics report, which indicate Linda had inhaled soil with traces of jet fuel before suffocating, lead Emma to suspect the teenager had originally been buried at a nearby air base in Suffolk, which at the time of her murder was being used by the Americans in the lead up to the Iraq War. CIA agent Heather Myles, who would rather Kevin stay in prison, wants access to the Syrian refugee staying with Emma, Miriam Attar, whose husband, Dr. Yusef Attar, is accused of being in ISIS and is being represented by Emma. Myles approaches DCS Olivia Greenwood, who now works with the Counter Terrorism Command (CTC), and promises her access to NSA surveillance on Emma's home. Greenwood at first refuses, but changes her mind when Emma leaks the photos of Linda to the press. Dominic Truelove, Emma's legal assistant, is the victim of a hit-and-run ordered by Myles when he is observing Pullings. The police raid Emma's home and take Miriam after they claim a call from there was made to a known ISIS number in Raqqa. Kevin is arrested and returned to prison when he comes to Miriam's aid.
| 3 | "Episode 3" | Pete Travis | Patrick Harbinson | 26 June 2017 | 4.90 |
A young woman named Siobhan Murphy contacts Emma and tells her Pullings took pornographic photos of her as well when she was 15, and that she was brought to parties to meet rich men. Matthew Wild's wife, Laura, meets Linda's family and, appearing moved after visiting Linda's old room, suggests writing Kevin and appealing to him as a father to stop the exhumation. Dominic tracks Pullings to a safe house, where he spots the same van that hit him. Olivia wants the SIM card that was missing from Miriam's phone, which she slipped into Emma's pocket before being taken away. Emma informs Olivia about Pullings and asks her to look up the plate number of the van, which Olivia discovers belongs to a firm that provides additional security to U.S. embassies. Already suspicious of Myles, Olivia demands to know why the Americans are so interested in Kevin's case. After Myles subtly threatens Olivia's career, Olivia lies to Emma and says the car belongs to a UK firm that does security for media. A judge grants the request to exhume Linda's body; the new coroner's report contradicts the police theory of the crime. Linda had not been struck in the legs and in the head with a shovel, as Kevin said in his false confession. Linda's leg injuries were consistent with bumper fractures from being struck by a car, and trace residue from bitumen showed her head injury came from striking the road. Annie, Kevin's former girlfriend, confirms that the weekend Linda disappeared, she had taken their car out of town for one final trip before she gave birth. At Kevin's trial, Pullings confirms taking photos of Linda but claims he didn't know how young she was; he also says he never took girls to any parties. Siobhan refuses to testify after Myles approaches her with Pullings' naked photos of her and gets her to believe that the photos will become public record and ruin her life. Two associates of Yusef Attar demand Miriam's SIM card, but Emma refuses, saying she will only give it to Yusef. After the police raid on her house, Emma's approval to become a foster parent is revoked.
| 4 | "Episode 4" | Pete Travis | Patrick Harbinson | 3 July 2017 | 5.23 |
Kevin's trial appears heading toward an acquittal until a crime scene photograph from his workshop shows a set of keys to the school van, which he is forced to admit he could have driven that weekend. Against Emma's advice, he takes a deal in which he pleads not guilty to murder but guilty to manslaughter. The terms of the deal allow him to walk free as he had already served the sentence he would have received for manslaughter. Kevin, bolstered by his son's presence in the court during the trial, is sure Jason now knows he is innocent, and he is eager to establish a relationship with his son. When Annie brings Jason to meet his father at a café, Jason calls his father a murderer for hitting Linda and burying her alive. Heartbroken, Kevin walks into the street and is hit by a lorry. He barely survives and ends up in a coma. Emma wants to find Pullings, but Olivia wants to know where Yusef is, which Emma cannot reveal. Emma, though she knows she is being tracked, travels to Birmingham and turns off her phone. This attracts the attention of Olivia and her CTC team. Emma is taken by the same two men to a house where Yusef is. She questions him and realises he is working with ISIS. When she tells him she did not bring the SIM card, he angrily has the two men take her away. She confirms he has fired her as his lawyer before she covertly reactivates her phone, alerting the CTC to Yusef's location. Olivia texts her Pullings' location, and with Dominic's assistance, they get the name of the American soldier Linda was involved with, Logan Bradley, then just 17. Emma travels to Washington, D.C. to meet Logan, who at first denies knowing Linda. When Emma tells him she knows he was transferred off the base within 24 hours of Linda's death, Logan panics but insists he never hurt anybody and warns her to leave. Air Force police then arrive and arrest Emma.
| 5 | "Episode 5" | Pete Travis | Patrick Harbinson | 10 July 2017 | 5.04 |
Under Myles' orders, Emma is taken to Andrews Air Force Base under armed guard. Myles refuses to answer questions and insists the matter is national security. Another soldier allows Logan secretly to meet with Emma. He explains that he met Linda in England through her uncle, who delivered supplies to the base from the Simms' pub. He said he and Linda were lovestruck teenagers and planned on getting married when he returned from Iraq. The night Linda disappeared, she had planned on going to the base with her friends but the base was closed to civilians because of the arrivals of VIPs. He said that when he found out that Linda was missing, he told his commanding officer that he had been dating her, and was immediately sent to the Middle East, and that if he ever told anyone he had been involved with her, he would be sent to Guantánamo. He informs Emma that once again, he is being sent overseas, this time with his wife and daughter. Back in England, Matthew Wild is elected Leader of the Opposition, after campaigning to support his fellow veterans and not repeat the mistakes of the Iraq War. Dominic and others discover she is being held at Andrews, where she is interrogated and threatened, but she refuses to divulge any information. Myles tries stall on releasing her but Jack Kretchmer, the Under Secretary of Defense during the Iraq War, tells her to give it up. Olivia, who was promoted to Chief Superintendent after Yusef's arrest, calls Myles and tells her documents on Yusef's computer prove that Emma was more involved than they suspected, and that she knows the name of his financial backers. Myles is happy to send Emma back, but Olivia's phone call turns out to be a ploy to secure her release.
| 6 | "Episode 6" | Pete Travis | Patrick Harbinson | 17 July 2017 | 5.26 |
Emma arrives at the hospital, Kevin having already passed away. Blaming herself for his death, she leaves a meeting at the firm where they discuss the closing of the Attar and Russell cases. Greenwood provides the information for Emma to reach Rachel's mother, revealing that she has been suspended for her actions with Emma. Brooks presses Greenwood for information on why Myles is so interested in Emma. While visiting she discovers that Wild's wife is the missing Rachel who agreed to help cover up the death of Linda in exchange for a better life. Myles prepares to set up the murder of Emma and to make it look like it was revenge from Attar's people. Greenwood warns her of the risks. Whilst Emma confronts Rachel, Matthew arrives home and realizes that Emma's car has a bomb under it and chooses to warn her about it. She prompts him to tell her what happened the night of Linda's death.
