= Mary: The Making of a Princess =

Australian television movie

- Genre: Drama
- Written by: Samantha Strauss
- Directed by: Jennifer Leacey
- Starring: Emma Hamilton; Ryan O'Kane; Gig Clarke; Renae Small; Nicholas Hope; Gareth Reeves; Alin Sumarwata; James Lugton; Shane Briant; Leah Purcell; Angela Punch McGregor
- Country of origin: Australia
- Original language: English

Production
- Producer: Antonia Barnard
- Running time: 88 minutes
- Production company: FremantleMedia Australia

Original release
- Network: Network Ten
- Release: 15 November 2015

Mary: The Making of a Princess is an Australian television film produced for Network Ten. It premiered on Network Ten on 15 November 2015.

== Plot ==
The film is about the courtship of Australian commoner Mary Donaldson and Frederik X of Denmark (who at the time was Crown Prince).

== Cast ==
- Emma Hamilton – Mary Donaldson
- Ryan O'Kane – Prince Frederik
- Gig Clarke – Andrew Miles
- Renae Small – Amber
- Nicholas Hope – Per Thornitt
- Gareth Reeves – Prince Joachim
- Alin Sumarwata – Princess Alexandra
- James Lugton – John Donaldson
- Shane Briant – Prince Henrik
- Leah Purcell – Toni Klan
- Angela Punch McGregor – Queen Margrethe
