= Tony Briggs =

Australian actor

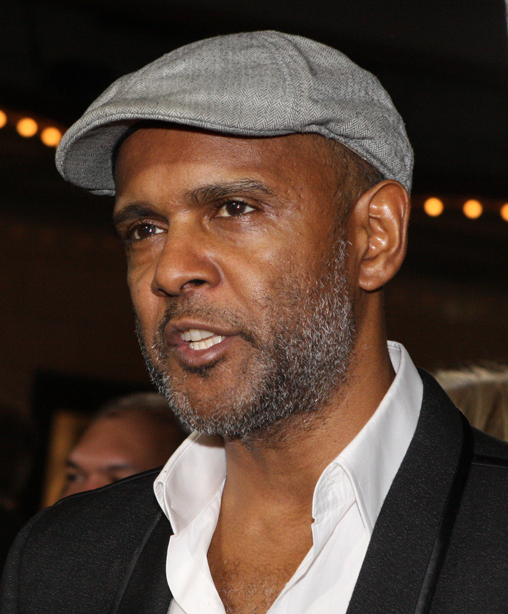
- Briggs in 2012
- Born: 3 July 1967 (age 59); Australia
- Occupations: Actor, writer
- Years active: 1987–present
- Spouse: Damienne Pradier
- Children: 3

Tony Briggs (born 3 July 1967) is an Aboriginal Australian actor. He is best known for creating the stage play The Sapphires (later a 2012 film), which tells the true story of an Aboriginal singing girl group who toured Vietnam during the war. Briggs is also a former track and field athlete.

== Early life ==
Tony Briggs was born on 3 July 1967. He is the son of Laurel Robinson, one of The Sapphires, and is a Yorta Yorta / Wurundjeri man.

He attended Scotch College, Melbourne as a boarding student from 1980 to 1985, and proved to be an outstanding athlete there. He was in the athletics team each year, and in 1985 was made Captain of Athletics. As of 2016 he held the school record for the 400m, the 110m hurdles (under-15, under-17 and open), and the under-16 100m hurdles. Believed to be the first Indigenous Australian student at the school, Briggs was a School House Prefect in his final year.

== Career ==
=== Television ===
Between 1987 and 1988, Briggs had the recurring role of banker Pete Baxter on television soap opera Neighbours. This was followed by many roles in television series such as Blue Heelers, Stingers and The Man From Snowy River. From 1997 he appeared in children's television series Ocean Girl as Dave Hartley.

From 2009, Briggs appeared in the television series The Circuit as Mick Mathers. In 2011, Briggs played Bilal in The Slap, based on the book by Christos Tsiolkas.

He also had a role in Redfern Now in 2012. In 2016, he played the role of Boondee in the television drama series Cleverman and Brett in Nowhere Boys: Two Moons Rising. In 2017 he had a role in Seven Types of Ambiguity and was involved in creating and writing the series The Warriors as well as appearing in a small role.

In 2024, Briggs was announced as part of the cast for Population 11.

=== Theatre ===
Briggs wrote the Helpmann Award-winning play The Sapphires, first performed in 2004. It tells the story of The Sapphires, a singing group of four Koori women who tour Vietnam during the war. It is inspired by the true story of his mother, Laurel Robinson, and aunt, Lois Peeler, who toured Vietnam as singers in 1968. Briggs adapted the play for the 2012 film The Sapphires.

=== Film ===
His movie roles include Australian Rules in 2002, Bran Nue Dae in 2009, Healing in 2014, and Joey in 1997.

Briggs is the founder and artistic director of the Birrarangga Film Festival, launched in 2019 in Melbourne. The biennial festival showcases films by indigenous filmmakers from around the world.

== Recognition and awards ==
Both the drama and film of The Sapphires won or were nominated for several awards, including winning the Helpmann Award in 2005 for best Australian New Work. Apart from these, Briggs was also the recipient of personal awards and recognition:

- 2012: Co-winner, Deadly Award – Jimmy Little Lifetime Achievement Award for Contribution to Aboriginal and Torres Strait Islander music, co-winner with the original Sapphires
- 2013: Awarded the Bob Maza Fellowship by Screen Australia to further his international career, which allowed him to attend an intensive course on directing and filmmaking in New York City
- 2013: NAIDOC Award – Artist of the Year

== Athletics career ==
Briggs was a successful 400m hurdler, and was runner-up at the Australian Athletics Championships from 1990 to 1992. He also finished third at the 1990 Championships in the 110m hurdles.

He was an Australian Institute of Sport athletics scholarship holder from 1986 to 1987.

== Other activities and roles ==
In 2016, Briggs became patron of his alma mater Scotch College's foundation to perpetually endow the Scotch College Indigenous Scholarship programme.

== Filmography ==
=== Television ===
Year	Title	Role	Notes
2024	Population 11	Jimmy James	
2023	The Newsreader	Uncle Owie	Season 2, 1 episode
2022	The Twelve	Warri Saunders	2 episodes
2021	Preppers	Kevin	1 episode
2021	Fires	IC Greg Hoy	1 episode
2019	Rosehaven	Brian	Season 3, 1 episode
2018	Rake	Greg Peters	3 episodes
2016–2017	Cleverman	Boondee / Trevor	8 episodes
2016–2017	Nowhere Boys	Brett	4 episodes
2017	The Warriors	Stuart	1 episode
2017	Seven Types of Ambiguity	Detective Threlfall	2 episodes
2015	Ready for This	Neville Preston	2 episodes
2014	Wentworth	Steve Faulkner	4 episodes
2013	The Broken Shore	Paul Dove	TV movie
2013	Hard Rock Medical	Nick	1 episode
2012	Redfern Now	Paul Maccoy	1 episode
2012	Howzat! Kerry Packer's War	Clive Lloyd	Miniseries, 2 episodes
2011	The Slap	Bilal	Miniseries, 2 episodes
2009–2010	The Circuit	Mick Mathers	6 episodes
2004	Stingers	Agent James Honey	1 episode
2000	Eugénie Sandler P.I.	Ice Cream Vendor	1 episode
1998	The Genie from Down Under 2	Mr Repo	1 episode
1998	Gargantua	Police Chief	TV movie
1996–1997	Ocean Girl	Dave Hartley	37 episodes
1995	Snowy River: The McGregor Saga	Toby King	1 episode
1994	Blue Heelers	Tony Dixon	1 episode
1991	Ratbag Hero	Jimmy	
1987–1988	Neighbours	Pete Baxter	18 episodes

=== Film / Shorts ===
Year	Title	Role	Notes
2023	Force of Nature: The Dry 2	Ian Chase	Feature film
2019	Ties That Bind	Police Officer	Short film
2014	Healing	Travis	Feature film
2012	The Oysterman	Joe	Short film
2009	Bran Nue Dae	Scary Black Man	Feature film
2005	The Djarn Djarns	Frankie Senior	Short film
2001	On the Nose	Michael Miller	Feature film
1999	The Order	Roy	Short film
1997	Joey	Mick	Feature film
1995	The Life of Harry Dare	Dan	Feature film
1993	Everybody's Business	Tony	
