= Ms Fisher's Modern Murder Mysteries =

Television series

- Title card
- Genre: Mystery; Crime; Costume drama; Period drama; Historical drama; Historical mystery
- Created by: Deb Cox; Fiona Eagger
- Starring: Geraldine Hakewill; Joel Jackson; Catherine McClements; Toby Truslove; Louisa Mignone; Greg Stone
- Country of origin: Australia
- Original language: English
- No. of series: 2
- No. of episodes: 12

Production
- Executive producers: Deb Cox; Fiona Eagger
- Producer: Beth Frey
- Production location: Melbourne
- Running time: 85 minutes (Series 1)
- Production company: Every Cloud Productions

Original release
- Network: Seven Network (Series 1); Acorn TV (Series 2)
- Release: 21 February 2019 – 19 July 2021

Ms Fisher's Modern Murder Mysteries (also stylised as Ms Fisher's MODern Murder Mysteries) is an Australian television drama series which began screening on the Seven Network on 21 February 2019. The series is a spin-off of the drama series Miss Fisher's Murder Mysteries, which was based on author Kerry Greenwood's series of Phryne Fisher detective novels.

Set in Melbourne in the mid-1960s, Ms Fisher's Modern Murder Mysteries revolves around the personal and professional life of Peregrine Fisher, daughter of Phryne’s half sister Annabelle (a result of an affair that Phryne’s father had), who inherits a fortune when the famous aunt she never knew goes missing over the highlands of New Guinea. Peregrine sets out to become a world-class private detective in her own right, guided by a group of exceptional women in The Adventuresses' Club, of which her aunt was also a member.

The series is produced by Beth Frey and directed by Fiona Banks, with Deb Cox, Samantha Winston, Chelsea Cassio and Jo Martino serving as writers for the series. Creators Fiona Eagger and Deb Cox also serve as executive producers.

A second season was commissioned by Acorn TV on 28 July 2020, which premiered on 7 June 2021 and concluded 19 July 2021.

== Cast ==
=== Main/regular ===
- Geraldine Hakewill as Peregrine Fisher
- Joel Jackson as Detective James Steed
- Catherine McClements as Birdie Birnside
- James Mason as Eric Wild
- Toby Truslove as Samuel Birnside
- Louisa Mignone as Violetta Fellini
- Greg Stone as Chief Inspector Percy Sparrow
- Katie Robertson as Constable Fleur Connor
- Madeline Davies as Linda Wade
- Emma Hamilton as Sally Whedon

=== Guests ===
- Alex Papps as Barry McBride (1 episode)
- Alicia Banit as Rita (1 episode)
- Bernard Curry as Dr. Clifford Gill (1 episode)
- Christopher Kirby as Abraham Sifo (1 episode)
- Dave Lawson as Freddy Miles (1 episode)
- Debra Lawrance as Henrietta Osborn (1 episode)
- Diana Glenn as June Montogomery Jones (1 episode)
- Gareth Yuen as Chung Li (1 episode)
- Georgia Chara as Julie Thomas (1 episode)
- Heather Mitchell as Edwina Maddox (1 episode)
- Jacek Koman as Alexander Kowalski (2 episodes)
- Jack Rowan as Rex Carr (1 episode)
- Jacob Collins-Levy as Laurence Osborn (1 episode)
- Jane Allsop as Shirley King (1 episode)
- Laura Wheelwright as Babs Crawford (1 episode)
- Libby Tanner as Florence Astor (1 episode)
- Ling Cooper Tang as Lucy Harrington (1 episode)
- Maria Mercedes as Joyce Hirsch (1 episode)
- Nell Feeney as Oona O'Doherty (1 episode)
- Nicholas Bell as Announcer (2 episodes)
- Steve Mouzakis as Hans Petersen (1 episode)

== Episodes ==
Series	Episodes	Originally released	
Series	Episodes	First released	Last released
1	4	21 February 2019	14 March 2019
2	8	7 June 2021	19 July 2021

=== Season 1 (2019) ===
No. overall	No. in series	Title	Directed by	Written by	Original release date
1	1	"Just Murdered"	Fiona Banks	Deb Cox	21 February 2019
Peregrine Fisher arrives in Melbourne to collect her inheritance from her aunt, Phryne Fisher, who has not been seen since her plane crashed in the jungles of Papua New Guinea a year ago. Wanting to be part of the same Adventuresses' Club as her aunt, Peregrine decides to follow in Phryne's footsteps and solve the murder of a model found dead at a bridal fashion show.
2	2	"Dead Beat"	Kevin Carlin	Jo Martino and Deb Cox	28 February 2019
Peregrine's ex-boyfriend has been implicated in the murder of a pop singer from a popular television show and Peregrine is determined to investigate. Violetta's past may just be the key to solving the case.
3	3	"Space for Murder"	Lynn Hegarty	Jo Martino and Samantha Winston	7 March 2019
Birdie's past comes back to haunt her when her friend is found murdered after sending her a cryptic message. Peregrine's investigation takes her to a top secret military facility and rumours of alien abductions and UFOs.
4	4	"Seasoned Murder"	Fiona Banks	Jo Martino and Alli Parker	14 March 2019
A chef is found dead at a culinary school run by Samuel's ex-sister-in-law. The investigation into the chef's murder leads to chefs that can't cook, questions about the car crash that killed Samuel's wife, and an injured Chief Inspector Sparrow.

For the UK broadcast, on the Drama channel commencing in January 2020, each episode was split into two parts.

=== Season 2 (2021) ===
No. overall	No. in season	Title	Directed by	Written by	Original release date
5	1	"Death by Design"	Kevin Carlin	Deb Cox with Matt Kazacos	7 June 2021
The morning after a party, an architect – who was supposed to be redesigning Peregrine's home – and his lover are found dead in the sauna. Peregrine and James attempt to retrace the partygoers' movements, but the task proves difficult as the guests were swapping partners in the name of free love.
6	2	"Come Die With Me"	Lynn Hegarty	Michael Miller	7 June 2021
Peregrine's excitement over her upcoming nuptials is short-lived as she begins to realize she and James have different plans for their future together. When a woman's body is discovered during flight attendant training at Melbourne Airport, Peregrine goes undercover at hostess school.
7	3	"Blood Wedding"	Lynn Hegarty	Felicity Packard	14 June 2021
James is called to investigate the murder of a farmhand the day before a wedding at an estate where James's father works. Peregrine tries to help, but James is still frosty towards her, and a reunion with his old flame doesn't help matters.
8	4	"A Killer Unleashed"	Kevin Carlin	Elizabeth Coleman	21 June 2021
At the Melbourne Kennel Club's 1964 championship dog show, a competitor dies and her prized collie is framed for the murder. Having sworn off men, Peregrine considers a canine companion herself. Meanwhile, Birdie returns from a trip but appears to be hiding something.
9	5	"Death Alley"	Jess Harris	Michael Miller	28 June 2021
A brawl at a bowling alley between rockers and mods leads to decapitation. When the police arrest Violetta's nephew for the murder, Peregrine sets out to prove his innocence.
10	6	"Coop de Grace"	Jess Harris	Trent Roberts	5 July 2021
On race day, the president of the Sandridge Pigeon Club is discovered dead in the coop, covered in feathers and choked by birdseed. While Peregrine works the case with James, Birdie has her own mysterious mission to complete.
11	7	"Reel Murder"	Lynn Hegarty	Felicity Packard	12 July 2021
The gang gather at the river to relax and distract themselves from their assorted heartaches, but when Samuel hooks a corpse with his fishing rod, a day in the sun turns deadly. It emerges that the victim evaded murder charges many years ago, and so Peregrine and James search for a suspect with motive for revenge.
12	8	"New Year's Evil"	Lynn Hegarty	Elizabeth Coleman	19 July 2021
Peregrine throws a New Year's Eve party at the Adventuresses' Club and invites Melbourne's hottest pop band to play. But it's not long before a shot rings out in the dark, leaving the lead singer dead on the floor. With all the suspects contained to the club, Peregrine and James must work together to discover the killer in their midst, even as the tension between them reaches a boiling point.

== Reception ==
John Anderson in The Wall Street Journal wrote that "the charismatic Geraldine Hakewill, as Peregrine Fisher, completely owns her show. ... “Ms. Fisher,” a four-episode romp through a curiously crime-ridden Melbourne, is all about reinvention". After viewing the first two episodes, Ann Donahue at IndieWire wrote "what makes “Ms. Fisher’s Modern Murder Mysteries” as satisfying as its original incarnation and keeps it away from the dreaded “cozy” label, redolent of teapots and elderly tabbies – is that beneath all the glamour is the undercurrent of how women with very little interest in the tedious social expectations of their time handle their systemic dismissal with verve."

K.L. Connie Wang from Parade was enthusiastic about Season 2, writing "A Jill of many trades...Peregrine is the epitome of a Camelot-era modern woman". Also about Season 2, Anthony Morris of ScreenHub wrote "The latest Ms Fisher franchise is crafted with care and style to spare. It's got a 60s sleuth you want to hang out with ... fans of mod murder will find much to enjoy as Peregrine embraces her role as an always fashionable P.I.."

The review aggregation website Rotten Tomatoes reports an 78% audience approval rating.
