= Ozone Disco fire =

1996 nightclub fire in Quezon City, Philippines

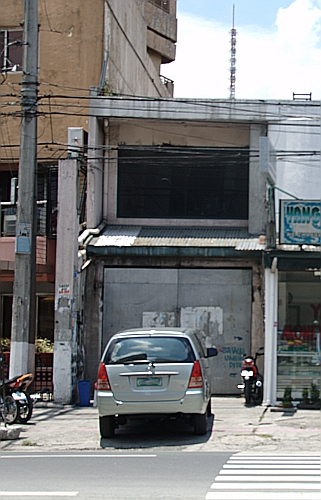
- The Ozone Disco building on Timog Avenue, Quezon City, in 2008. The site was never rebuilt after the fire and demolished in March 2015.
- Date: March 18, 1996; 30 years ago
- Time: 11:35 p.m. (UTC+08:00)
- Location: Timog Avenue, Barangay South Triangle, Quezon City, Philippines; 14°38′06″N 121°02′09″E
- Type: Fire
- Cause: Unknown, believed to be electrical fire
- Deaths: 162
- Injuries: 95

The Ozone Disco fire in Quezon City, Philippines, occurred on March 18, 1996, leaving 162 people dead. It is officially acknowledged as the worst fire in Philippine history, and among the ten worst nightclub fires in the world.

== History ==
Ozone Disco was located by the 11th World Scout Jamboree Memorial Rotonda along Timog Avenue. Prior to opening in 1991, the site housed a jazz club called Birdland, owned by Sergio Orgaoow from 1978 until 1990. Orgaoow later sold the building and lot to Hermilo Ocampo, owner and president of Westwood Entertainment Company, Inc.

The Ocampos then converted the site to a discothèque, capitalizing on the popularity of electronic music in the Philippines; they refurbished the building and added mezzanines. Ozone Disco officially opened in 1991, and became a popular spot in Quezon City for students and young professionals in the mid-1990s.

== Incident ==
The fire broke out just before midnight on Monday, March 18, 1996. At the time of the incident, there were an estimated 350 patrons and 40 club employees inside Ozone Disco, despite the venue having a capacity of only 35 people. The majority of the club guests were high school and college students celebrating graduations or the end of the school year. Survivors reported seeing sparks flying inside the disc jockey's booth shortly before midnight, followed by smoke which they thought was a stage effect. Another survivor added that after about 15 seconds of smoke, the electrical system of the disco failed as flames quickly became visible. The DJ, another survivor, recalled the microphone died as he was about to warn patrons and employees about the fire.

Many of the bodies were discovered piled waist-high along the corridor leading to the only exit. Through initial investigations, it was determined no proper fire exit had been installed; Quezon City officials were quoted as saying the only known emergency exit was blocked by a new building next door, which journalists stated only led to the female restroom of an adjoining establishment. It was also reported that security bouncers had locked the main entrance from the outside, believing a riot had erupted.

=== Casualties ===
The final death toll was reported at between 160 to 162 people, the latter cited by the trial court that heard the ensuing criminal case. At least 95 people were also injured. The high death toll was one of the worst ever for a nightclub fire, though it was subsequently surpassed by the República Cromañón nightclub fire.

== Investigation and aftermath ==
Six people involved with Westwood Entertainment Company, Inc. were tried for criminal charges of "reckless imprudence resulting in multiple homicide and multiple serious injuries". On March 16, 2001, Westwood Entertainment president Hermilo Ocampo and corporate treasurer Ramon Ng were found guilty by a Quezon City trial court and sentenced to a four-year prison term, and fined ₱25 million each. They and their co-accused (who were acquitted) were also ordered to indemnify the families of the dead ₱150,000, and ₱100,000 pesos to the injured. The trial court concluded Ocampo and Ng had failed to provide fire exits and sprinklers inside the establishment, the fire extinguishers they placed were defective, and the only exit was a small door that swung inward and failed to comply with the building code. A former employee who had survived the fire said the inward swinging doors were installed as it was good feng shui.

In November 2001, twelve officials of the Quezon City government were charged before the Sandiganbayan (the country's anti-graft court) for reckless imprudence resulting in multiple homicides and multiple serious injuries. They were accused of allowing Ozone Disco to secure a certificate of annual inspection in 1995 "despite the inadequacy, insufficiency and impropriety of the documents submitted by the owners". In 2007, one of the twelve – former Quezon City engineer and building official Alfredo Macapugay – was discharged from criminal and civil liabilities after the Sandiganbayan concluded he had no hand in issuing permits to Ozone Disco's management.

On November 20, 2014, seven officials of the Quezon City government were found guilty by the Sandiganbayan of violating Republic Act No. 3019, known as the "Anti-Graft and Corrupt Practices Act”. They were held liable for negligence in connection with the approval of the building permit and issuance of certificates of occupancy to Westwood Entertainment Company, Inc., whose owners were also found liable. The Sandiganbayan later affirmed its decision in April 2015.

== Former site and developments ==
For some few years after the incident, there was a makeshift memorial on the site featuring photographs of the victims. This has since been dismantled, with no marker or official memorial remaining. The building which housed Ozone Disco stood unused along Timog Avenue for over 20 years.

In March 2015, a week shy of the 19th anniversary of the fire, Ozone Disco's building was demolished. Relatives of the victims still visit the site. As of October 2016, the former site of the building is occupied by a branch of the rice porridge chain GoodAh!!!, co-owned by television host Boy Abunda.

== In media ==
- This incident was featured on two ABS-CBN shows:
  - The Philippine reality crime and investigative documentary show Calvento Files, revisited the case in an episode, titled "Mga Biktima ng Ozone", aired March 29, 1996.
  - The horror docudrama series Nginiig aired an episode about the incident during its Jericho Rosales era in late-2004.
- The tragedy was featured thrice on GMA Network shows:
  - Lihim ng Gabi featured the incident in a 1996 episode.
  - Public affairs investigative journalism program Brigada Siete discussed the fire a few days after.
  - The October 2, 2008 episode of the public affairs docudrama program Case Unclosed featured the fire and its aftermath as the pilot episode, directed by Adolfo Alix, Jr. Two days before the premiere of Case Unclosed, on September 29, 2008, then-Quezon City Mayor Feliciano Belmonte, Jr., father of incumbent Quezon City mayor Joy Belmonte, released an ordinance that requires the owners of entertainment establishments to use swing-in/swing-out doors.
- The fire is the subject of the song "OZONE (Itulak ang Pinto)" from Unique Salonga's album Grandma.

== See also ==
- List of nightclub fires
- Luoyang Christmas fire December 25, 2000; Luoyang, People's Republic of China; 309 dead
- Manor Hotel fire – second worst fire in the Philippines, happened in August 2001 also in Quezon City
- Kentex slipper factory fire – third worst fire in the Philippines, happened in May 2015
