= Emma Hamilton (Australian actress) =

Australian actress (born 1984)

- Born: 1984 (age 41–42); Melbourne, Australia
- Education: Royal Academy of Dramatic Art (B.A., 2007)
- Occupation: Actress

Emma Hamilton (born 13 November 1984) is an Australian actress. On television, she stars in the Seven drama RFDS (2021). She has also appeared as a series lead in the Nine Network drama thriller Hyde & Seek (2016), along with series regular roles as Anne Stanhope in the Showtime historical drama The Tudors (2009–2010), Rosie Dolly on the ITV/PBS period drama Mr Selfridge (2015), and in the ITV crime thriller Fearless (2017). Her films include the Australian drama Last Cab to Darwin (2015), which earned her an AACTA nomination for Best Actress in a Supporting Role.

== Background ==
Hamilton trained at the Royal Academy of Dramatic Art.

== Career ==
Hamilton made her television debut in the hit Showtime drama series The Tudors, portraying the sharp-tongued Anne Stanhope in seasons three and four. Her breakthrough role was in the highly acclaimed film Last Cab to Darwin in 2015, for which she was nominated for Best Supporting Actress at the AACTA Awards. She is known for her roles in Mr Selfridge, Hyde & Seek and Mary: The Making of a Princess.

Notable feature films include the black comedy Whole Lotta Sole with Brendan Fraser by Oscar-winning director Terry George, and the action thriller The Cold Light of Day where she starred alongside Bruce Willis and Henry Cavill.

Hamilton's first professional role was in HBO's World War II film Into the Storm, produced by Ridley Scott, upon graduating drama school. Subsequently, she made her stage debut as Isabella Thorpe in an adaptation of Jane Austen's Northanger Abbey at the Salisbury Playhouse in September 2007. Her first major stage role followed in 2008 in the Royal Exchange Theatre's production of Tennessee Williams' The Glass Menagerie where she played Laura Wingfield opposite Brenda Blethyn, her portrayal described as "a haunting, heartbreaking performance". In 2010 she performed alongside Gemma Arterton and Stephen Dillane in the off-West End production of Ibsen's The Master Builder. Hamilton's leading performance in the title role of Ibsen's Hedda Gabler at the Royal & Derngate Theatre in 2012 was critically acclaimed.

In 2013 Hamilton joined the Royal Shakespeare Company playing Queen Isabella opposite David Tennant in Richard II (play), Gregory Doran's first production as artistic director. Richard II broke records as the fastest selling production in RSC history and when screened live to cinemas around the UK on 13 November 2013, played to an audience of over 60,000.

Hamilton returned to international screens as Eleanor, the malevolent red-headed half-sister of Porthos in the BBC's The Musketeers. She then went on to star in the romantic comedy Mary: The Making of a Princess in the title role of Mary Donaldson, the future Crown Princess of Denmark. The television biopic was the highest rating drama for the network for that year, earning praise as "fun...tearjerking film-making." Hamilton physically transformed herself for the role, dying her hair brunette and wearing brown contact lenses. In that year Hamilton also featured as Rosie Dolly (one of the infamous Dolly sisters), the blonde American love interest of Mr Selfridge in the fourth season of the period drama starring Jeremy Piven. In 2016 she starred in her first major series television lead role as ex-NZSIS agent Claire McKenzie in the crime thriller Hyde & Seek.

In 2017 Hamilton appeared in the ITV thriller series alongside Helen McCrory and Michael Gambon in Fearless as a dark character with a dual identity; Laura Wild who was formerly Rachel Leigh.

Hamilton currently appears as Dr Eliza Harrod in the Australian television hit TV series RFDS, an Australian drama series which centres on the lives of the workers of the Royal Flying Doctor Service. RFDS won Best Drama twice at the Australian Logie Awards, first for Season 2 in 2024 and again for Season 3 in 2026.

== Personal life ==
In 2019 Hamilton had a child conceived via IVF, named Oliver.

== Filmography ==
=== Film ===
Year	Title	Role	Notes
2019	Fallen Queen (aka Fatal Beauty)	Renee Gustafson	TV film
2015	Last Cab to Darwin	Julie	Feature film
2015	Mary: The Making of a Princess	Mary Donaldson	TV film (Network Ten)
2013	Royal Shakespeare Company: Richard II	Queen Isabella	
2012	The Cold Light of Day	Dara Collins	Feature film
2011	Whole Lotta Sole	Tracey Maguire	Feature film
2008	Into the Storm	Betty	TV film (HBO)
2007	Friends Forever	Prayer Girl	Short film (NFTS)

=== Television ===
Year	Title	Role	Notes
2021-	RFDS	Dr. Eliza Harrod	Season 1-3 (7 Network)
2023-2024	Ten Pound Poms	Sheila Anderson	Season 1-2 (BBC One/Stan)
2021	Ms Fisher's Modern Murder Mysteries	Sally Whedon	Season 2, 6 episodes (7 Network)
2017	Fearless	Rachel Leigh / Laura Wild	Season 1 (ITV)
2016	Hyde & Seek	Claire McKenzie	Season 1 (Nine Network)
2015	Mr Selfridge	Rosie Dolly	Season 4 (ITV)
2015	The Musketeers	Eleanor Belgard	Season 2, Episode 8 (BBC)
2013	Agatha Christie's Poirot	Sally Legge	Season 13, Episode 3 Dead Man's Folly (ITV)
2013	Case Histories	Hope McMaster	Season 2, Episode 1 Started Early, Took My Dog (BBC)
2009–2010	The Tudors	Anne Stanhope	Seasons 3 & 4 (Showtime)

== Theatre ==
Year	Title	Role	Theatre
2013	Richard III	Queen Isabella	Royal Shakespeare Company
2012	Hedda Gabler	Hedda Gabler	Royal & Derngate
2011	Racing Demon	Frances Parnell	Sheffield Crucible
2010	The Master Builder	Kaja Fosli	Almeida Theatre
2008	The Glass Menagerie	Laura Wingfield	Royal Exchange Theatre (& Bath Theatre Royal National Tour)
2007	Northanger Abbey	Isabella Thorpe	Salisbury Playhouse
