= Whole Lotta Sole =

- Whole Lotta Sole film poster
- Directed by: Terry George
- Written by: Terry George; Thomas Gallagher
- Produced by: Terry George; David Gorder; Simon Bosanquet; Jay Russell
- Starring: Brendan Fraser; Colm Meaney; David O'Hara; Yaya DaCosta; Martin McCann
- Cinematography: Des Whelan
- Edited by: Nick Emerson
- Music by: Foy Vance
- Production companies: Generator Entertainment; Media Pro Six; Menlo Park Productions
- Distributed by: Lightning Entertainment Group, Inc
- Release date: 21 April 2012 (Tribeca Film Festival)
- Running time: 89 minutes
- Countries: United Kingdom; Ireland
- Language: English
- Budget: $5.5 million

Whole Lotta Sole (known as Stand Off in North America) is a 2012 independent crime comedy film co-written and directed by Terry George and starring Brendan Fraser, David O'Hara, Colm Meaney, Yaya DaCosta and Martin McCann.

== Plot ==
Hoping to pay back some gambling debt he owes to local mobster Mad Dog Flynn, Jim robs the local fishmongers, only to discover that it's actually a front for the mobster's business. Now on the run and pursued by police detective Weller, Jim is cornered in an antique shop where he takes hostage a collection of colourful characters, including American Joe Maguire, the owner who may be his illegitimate father, and his girlfriend Sophie. Caught between the mobster's gang and the police, the unfortunate young Jim must find a way out of this tricky situation with help from his hostages

== Cast ==
- Brendan Fraser as Joe Maguire
- David O'Hara as Mad Dog Flynn
- Colm Meaney as Weller
- Yaya DaCosta as Sophie
- Martin McCann as Jim
- Conor MacNeill as Sox
- Emma Hamilton as Tracey Maguire
- Michael Legge as Randy
- Jonathan Harden as Pavis
- Marie Jones as Ma Flynn
- Rupert Wickham as Farnsworth
- Amanda Girvan as Police Woman
- Darran Watt as Police Man
- Mary McCrossan as Annie
- Amanda Hurwitz as Mary Ellen
- Hugh McLaughlin as Clipper

== Production ==
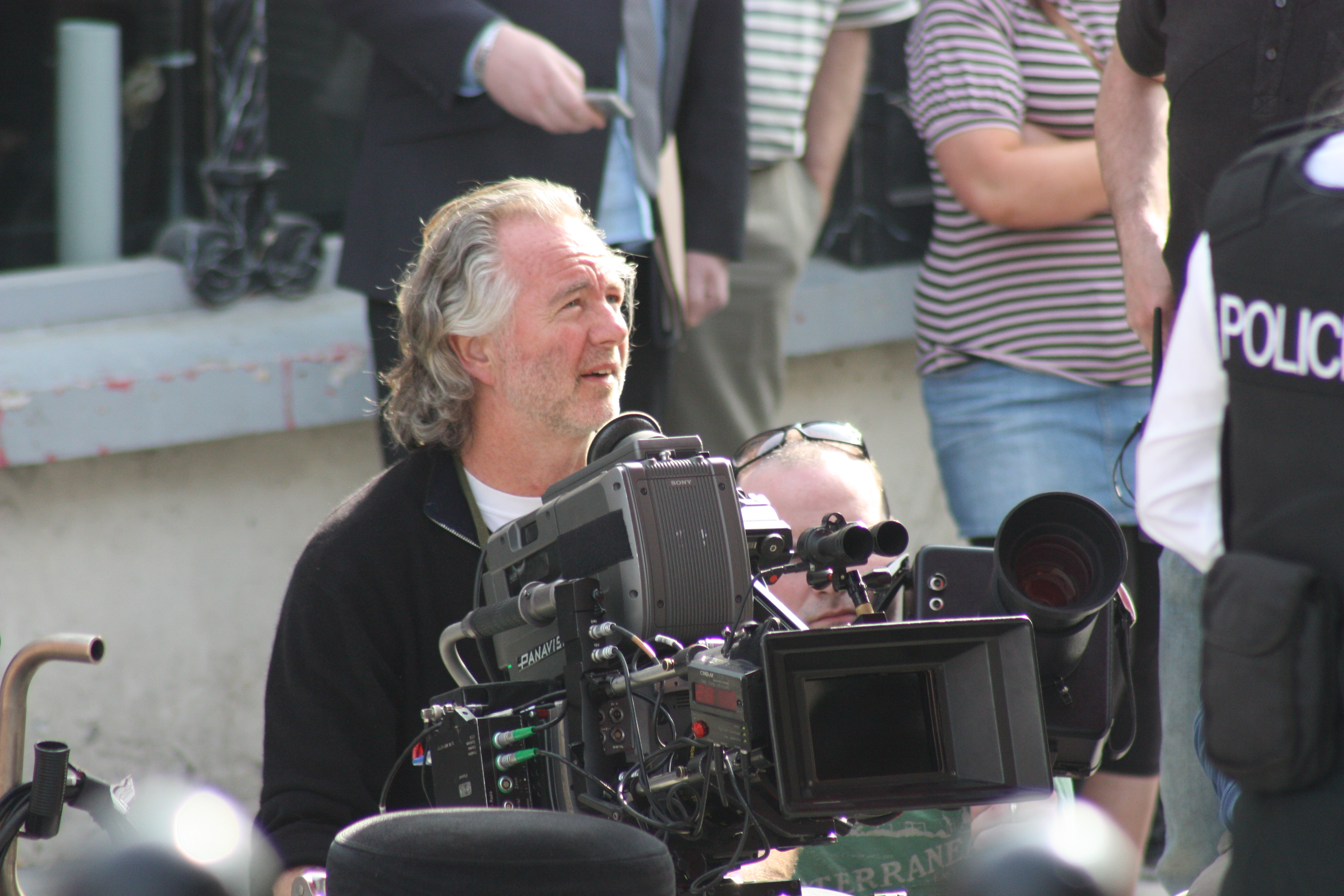
Cinematographer Des Whelan during location shooting in Downpatrick, April 2011

Whole Lotta Sole was filmed in Downpatrick and Belfast, Northern Ireland. Filming began on 8 April 2011.

== Release ==
The film had its world premiere on Saturday 21 April 2012, in the Spotlight Series at the Tribeca Film Festival 2012, had its European premiere on Sunday 10 June 2012, at the Belfast Film Festival, was shown at the Traverse City Film Festival in Michigan in August 2012 and was shown at the Mill Valley, Hamptons International Film Festivals and Austin Film Festival in October 2012. The film has also been picked up for distribution in European, South African and Asian territories. The film, as Stand Off, was shown at the Mostly British Film Festival in San Francisco (22 January 2013) and was released in US theatres on 28 June 2013.
