= Hyde & Seek =

Television series

- Genre: Crime drama Thriller
- Created by: Rachel Lang; Gavin Strawhan
- Written by: Rachel Lang; Gavin Strawhan; Niki Aken; Michelle Offen
- Directed by: Peter Andrikidis; David Caesar; Daniel Nettheim
- Starring: Matt Nable; Emma Hamilton; Mandy McElhinney; Deborra-Lee Furness; Zoe Ventoura; Tai Hara; Claire Lovering; Jeremy Lindsay Taylor
- Country of origin: Australia
- Original language: English
- No. of seasons: 1
- No. of episodes: 8

Production
- Executive producers: Andy Ryan; Jo Rooney; Debbie Lee
- Producer: Stephen Corvini
- Cinematography: Nicholas Owens
- Editor: Neil Thumpston
- Production company: Matchbox Pictures

Original release
- Network: Nine Network
- Release: 3 October – 21 November 2016

Hyde & Seek is an Australian television drama thriller series that premiered on the Nine Network on 3 October 2016 at 8:45 pm. The programme was not renewed for a second season.

== Synopsis ==
When his best mate is killed in a seemingly random attack, Detective Gary Hyde (Matt Nable) vows to bring the killers to justice. Together with his new partner Claire McKenzie (Emma Hamilton), Gary uncovers a criminal underbelly of murder, identity fraud, chaos and intrigue where no one is safe and no one can be trusted. In a world where crime has no borders and everyone has something to hide, Gary and Claire risk it all to catch the criminals but will they lose their loved ones in the process?

== Cast ==
- Matt Nable as Gary Hyde, a Detective Sergeant in the NSW Police Homicide Squad.
- Emma Hamilton as Claire McKenzie, a special investigator in immigration profiling for the New Zealand Department of Immigration
- Mandy McElhinney as Jackie Walters, Federal Agent and Team Leader of the AFP Counter-Terrorism Unit
- Deborra-Lee Furness as Claudia Rossini, Director of Counter-Terrorism for ASIO.
- Zoe Ventoura as Sonya Hyde, wife of Gary Hyde
- Tai Hara as Detective Kevin Soga, a member of the NSW Police Homicide Squad
- Claire Lovering as Detective Tanya Martin, a member of the NSW Police Homicide Squad
- Jeremy Lindsay Taylor as Andrew Mills, an ASIO Intelligence Officer
- Alexander Bertrand as Danny Tollis
- Andrew McFarlane as Stuart Flanagan
- Beau Brady as Ryan
- Joel Jackson as Lachlan Ford
- Josh Quong Tart as Dale
- Rahel Romahn as Jamil
- Wendy Strehlow as Elaine

== Episodes ==
| No. | Title | Directed by | Written by | Original release date | Prod. code | Aus. viewers (millions) |
|---|---|---|---|---|---|---|
| 1 | "Episode 1" | Peter Andrikidis | Rachel Lang & Gavin Strawhan | 3 October 2016 | 276035-1 | 0.878 |
Detective Gary Hyde and his best friend and fellow detective, Nick Petrides are called to a homicide. The murder victim's van explodes, killing Nick instantly. Gary breaks the news to Nick's pregnant widow, Angela, and vows to find whoever is responsible. Gary draws strength from his wife, Sonya and son, Oscar — a leukaemia survivor. Together with his new partner Claire McKenzie, AFP boss Jackie Walters and Australian Security Intelligence Organisation chiefs, Gary uncovers a criminal underbelly of murder and fraud as he is thrust into the secretive world of homeland security. In a world where crime has no borders and everyone has something to hide, Gary's wife and young children find themselves in the firing line.
| 2 | "Episode 2" | Peter Andrikidis | Rachel Lang | 10 October 2016 | 276035-2 | 0.694 |
Gary rescues Jamil, the sole surviving student from the shootout, and interrogates him. Claire takes a more sympathetic approach and she and Gary suspect that Jamil is innocent. Jackie learns that the gunman killed a Special Ops cop and clashes with Gary when she demands time with the witness. Gary's superior officer, Stuart, forces Gary to take leave and Sonya is pleased he can spend with his family. But Gary is still driven to avenge his partner's death. Gary and Claire travel to Hong Kong in the hunt for Nick's killer and uncover a terrorist network operating inside Australia.
| 3 | "Episode 3" | David Caesar | Gavin Strawhan | 17 October 2016 | 276035-3 | 0.642 |
Task Force Troy is in operation. The vehicle that tried to run Gary down is under surveillance and Gary hopes it will lead them to Nick's killer. Instead, a different suspect is revealed whom Claire identifies as being in possession of a dodgy NZ passport. Gary gives chase but Abbud kills himself. When Gary and Kevin search his place where they find 500 k worth of gold. Gary and Claire track a suspected terrorist to Far North Queensland and intercept a smuggler with a deadly cargo.
| 4 | "Episode 4" | David Caesar | Rachel Lang & Gavin Strawhan | 24 October 2016 | 276035-4 | 0.656 |
Gary is coaching Oscar's soccer team, but Oscar is frustrated by his father's overprotectiveness. When a teenage gunman fires on a radio shock jock, Gary and Claire are drawn into the investigation. The victim, Mikey Jackson, survives but is in a serious condition. The gunman is identified as Basam Karim, the son of a prominent Muslim community leader. Omar is horrified by his son's actions but a search of his house reveals a cache of hidden weapons. There is no sign of Basam. Sonya defends the rights of her star pupil, who is a terrorism suspect in Gary's investigation.
| 5 | "Episode 5" | Daniel Nettheim | Rachel Lang | 31 October 2016 | 276035-5 | 0.576 |
The day of the Asia Pacific Security Forum has arrived and the team is on high alert when Ali King is spotted on security cameras near the forum venue. Angela suffers a melt down and fears there's a bomb under her car. Gary talks her down but experiences flashbacks to Nick's death and Sonya is worried about his state of mind. Claire is held hostage in a deadly bus hijack, as Gary comes face to face with the terrorist who murdered his partner.
| 6 | "Episode 6" | Daniel Nettheim | Niki Aken & Gavin Strawhan | 7 November 2016 | 276035-6 | 0.498 |
Gary believes he has got justice for Nick. Sonya is looking forward to having Gary at home on leave, but Gary is disturbed that Claire doesn't believe it's over. Claire is piqued to learn that Ali King had a packed suitcase and a ticket to Indonesia but Jackie refuses to let her go. Gary has flashbacks to the shooting of Ali King. He goes to see Claire who runs through her reasons for believing Ali wasn't in charge. When Gary tells Sonya he is going to Indonesia she is furious.
| 7 | "Episode 7" | Peter Andrikidis | Michelle Offen | 14 November 2016 | 276035-7 | 0.595 |
Claire is convinced that Jackie is behind the conspiracy but Gary is cautious. They voice their concerns to ASIO Director Claudia Rossini but their clandestine meeting is interrupted by news of a bombing at a Mosque. Another bomb, under Claudia's car, fails to explode. Claudia wants the team on the case and Jackie feels undermined. The trail leads to Danny, whom Kevin knows as a drug dealer. Gary captures Danny but has to fend off his girlfriend, Dakota. Gary is concerned to see a text warning Danny of the raid. Gary and Sonya's marriage faces a crisis when their son, Oscar, has a health scare.
| 8 | "Episode 8" | Peter Andrikidis | Rachel Lang & Gavin Strawhan | 21 November 2016 | 276035-8 | 0.567 |
Gary and Oscar are unhurt when the car is rammed, but Sonya is rushed into the theatre. Claire picks up the investigation into the bomber, Keg. But ASIO has taken Keg away. Tanya and Kevin track him but Keg has hanged himself. Surveillance footage shows Claudia visiting Keg before he died. Gary feels betrayed but Claire urges caution. Gary's relieved Sonya is out of the theatre and even more relieved that an ultra scan shows the baby is okay. Sonya wants him to find Nick's killer and finish it.

== Viewership ==
| No. | Title | Air date | Overnight ratings | | Consolidated ratings | | Total viewers | Ref(s) |
| No. | Title | Air date | Viewers | Rank | Viewers | Rank | Total viewers | Ref(s) |
|---|---|---|---|---|---|---|---|---|
| 1 | Episode 1 | 3 October 2016 | 878,000 | 8 | 125,000 | 7 | 1,003,000 | |
| 2 | Episode 2 | 10 October 2016 | 694,000 | 14 | 60,000 | 14 | 754,000 | |
| 3 | Episode 3 | 17 October 2016 | 642,000 | 16 | 141,000 | 12 | 783,000 | |
| 4 | Episode 4 | 24 October 2016 | 656,000 | 14 | 125,000 | 12 | 781,000 | |
| 5 | Episode 5 | 31 October 2016 | 576,000 | 16 | 155,000 | 11 | 731,000 | |
| 6 | Episode 6 | 7 November 2016 | 498,000 | 9 | 155,000 | 16 | 653,000 | |
| 7 | Episode 7 | 14 November 2016 | 595,000 | 18 | 120,000 | 11 | 715,000 | |
| 8 | Episode 8 | 21 November 2016 | 567,000 | 17 | 158,000 | 14 | 725,000 | |

== International broadcast ==
Hyde & Seek debuted on Three in New Zealand on 15 May 2017.
