= Louisa Mignone =

Australian actress

Louisa Mignone is an Australian stage, film and television actress. Mignone is known for her roles in Wentworth, Australian Gangster and Ms Fisher's Modern Murder Mysteries as Violetta Fellini.

== Career ==
In 2018, Mignone was named in the cast for the Miss Fisher's Murder Mysteries spin off series Ms Fisher's Modern Murder Mysteries. Mignone appeared for the 2018–19 theatre season of The Club by David Williamson.

In January 2019, Mignone was announced for the second series of Secret City. On 21 February 2022, Mignone was announced in the extended cast of Foxtel's first season of legal drama The Twelve, based on the Belgian series of the same name. In 2024, Mignone appeared in Paramount+ Australia series Fake.

On 12 February 2025, Mignone was announced as part of the local cast for Liam Neeson film The Mongoose.

== Personal life ==
Mignone is the sister of actor Aldo Mignone.

== Filmography ==
=== Television appearances ===
Year	Title	Role	Notes	Ref
2024	Fake	Peggy	6 episodes	
2023	Scrublands	Lily Coulson	2 episodes	
2023	La Brea	Jane	1 episode	
2022	The Twelve	Detective Chedid	9 episodes	
2020–21	Wentworth	Zaina Saad	17 episodes	
2021	Australian Gangster	Melinda Barbaro	2 episodes	
2019–21	Ms Fisher's Modern Murder Mysteries	Violetta Fellini	12 episodes	
2020	Halifax: Retribution	Serena	1 episode	
2020	How to Stay Married	Martina	1 episode	
2019	Secret City	Mina Almasi	6 episodes	
2012–16	Rake	Advisor Chris	11 episodes	
2016	Pandemic	Mara	5 episodes	
2015	Miss Fisher's Murder Mysteries	Concetta	1 episode	
2014	Fat Tony & Co.	Maria Tomasetti	4 episodes	
2013	Wonderland	Celine	1 episode	
2012	Danger 5	Voice Artist	2 episodes	
2009	My Place	Sofia	1 episode	
2007	East West 101	Summah	1 episode	

=== Film appearances ===
Year	Title	Role	Notes
TBA	The Mongoose	Captain Hendricks	
2019	Sweet Tooth	The Lady	Short
2019	Kismet	Detective Sevdah Terzi	Short
2018	Souls of Totality	Soul	Short
2016	Science Fiction Volume One: The Osiris Child	April	Voice
2016	Trust Fund	Sophia	
2015	Observance	Rachel	
2015	Infini	Phillipa Boxen	
2014	Milk & Honey	Sofia	Short
2014	Nocturn	Luz	Short
2012	The Allen Boy	Peaceful Protestor	
2012	Wish You Were Here	Alda	
2010	She Loves Me, She Loves Me Not	Milena	
2010	Letters to Sally	Girl #1	
2009	Encyclopaedia Britannica	Najwa	
2008	Two Fists One Heart	Francesca	
2007	Spike Up	Amy	

== Theatre ==
Year	Title	Role	Notes	Ref
2024	The Almighty Sometimes	Vivienne	Melbourne Theatre Co	
2022	Anna K	Dana / Beth / Veronika	Malthouse Theatre	
2018–19	The Club	Cast	State Theatre South Australia, Belvoir	
2017	Angelique	Mauve/George		
2016	Antigone	Ismene	Reginald Theatre	
