= Nocebo (film) =

2022 psychological thriller film

- Theatrical release poster
- Directed by: Lorcan Finnegan
- Written by: Garret Shanley
- Produced by: Bianca Balbuena; Brunella Cocchiglia; Maxime Cottray; Cloé Garbay; David Gilbery; Patti Lapus; Emily Leo; Bradley Liew; Mary McCarthy; Bastien Sirodot; Marlon Vogelgesang
- Starring: Eva Green; Mark Strong; Chai Fonacier; Billie Gadsdon; Cathy Belton; Anthony Falcon
- Cinematography: Jakub Kijowski; Radek Ladczuk
- Edited by: Tony Cranstoun
- Music by: Jose Buencamino
- Production companies: RLJE Films; XYZ Films; Screen Ireland; Epic Media; Wild Swim Films; Lovely Productions
- Distributed by: Shudder (United States); Vertigo Films (United Kingdom); TBA Studios; Star Cinema (Philippines); Wildcard Distribution (Ireland)
- Release dates: 22 November 2022 (United States); 18 January 2023 (Philippines)
- Running time: 97 minutes
- Countries: Ireland; Philippines; United States; United Kingdom
- Languages: English; Cebuano; Filipino
- Box office: $142,918 (Worldwide)

Nocebo is a 2022 Filipino-Irish psychological thriller film directed by Lorcan Finnegan and written by Garret Shanley. The film stars Eva Green, Mark Strong, Chai Fonacier, Billie Gadsdon, Cathy Belton and Anthony Falcon.

== Plot ==
While Christine, a children's fashion designer, takes a call, a disease-ridden dog approaches and shakes itself, spreading ticks onto her before vanishing. One tick attaches itself to the nape of her neck, subsequently debilitating Christine with a mysterious illness. A woman named Diana arrives at her home, claiming to be the caregiver Christine had hired. Christine's husband, Felix, and daughter, Bobs, are both distrustful of Diana. After settling in, Diana unpacks her suitcase, revealing a collection of relics and folk magic ingredients. She uses a matchbox to summon and capture the tick that bit Christine, then assembles an altar in her room's fireplace and uses its ashes in a ritual to commune with the unseen spirit of a child.

During dinner, Christine gets sudden pains in her arms. Diana comes to her aid and cures Christine by hovering her hands over her arms then tickling her until the pain disappears. Diana explains that she possesses supernatural powers which she received in childhood from a dying old woman who was an ongo looking for someone to transfer her powers to after death. Diana then swallowed a black chick that exited the woman's mouth and approached her. Diana subsequently used her powers for her income but became a social pariah after she is deemed to be a witch.

Christine allows Diana to treat her, with positive results. Despite this, Felix remains wary of Diana. He confronts Diana in her room and orders her to stay away from Christine. A defiant Diana suggests he leave, telling him ominously to be careful with the stairs. As Felix is about to descend, he is attacked by Bobs' pet canary, which he kills after hitting it in panic. As Diana and Bobs bond while burying the bird, Felix senses that Diana is responsible for the incident and fears she is driving a wedge between him and his family.

After Christine's medications go missing, Felix searches Diana's room and discovers the altar and the drugs under Diana's bed, prompting him and Christine to fire Diana. Before departing, Diana asks Bobs to do her a favor. The following day, Bobs tells Christine that Felix hid the drugs to frame Diana, prompting a fight between Christine and Felix. As Felix moves upstairs to cool off, he is attacked by a canary that resembles Bobs' pet and is injured after falling from the top of the staircase. Felix is hospitalized, while Diana returns to care for a relapsed Christine.

As Diana performs a final ritual for Christine, she reveals that she is not curing Christine, but punishing her. Christine then sees flashbacks of Diana's life in the Philippines where she lived happily with her husband and daughter until they were expelled by landgrabbers and fled to Cebu City. Diana was forced to work at a sweatshop used by Christine to produce her clothing line and took her daughter with her. During a visit, Christine advised the managers to overwork the employees and lock the only exit to prevent theft, which resulted in the death of Diana's daughter and her coworkers following a fire. Diana, who happened to be outside at the time, subsequently hexed Christine by sending her a spectre of the dog. As Christine begs for forgiveness, Diana calls her a tick and makes Christine physically experience the fire and face Diana's badly burned daughter.

As Felix arrives to find Christine's burnt body seated at her sewing machine, Diana tells Bobs to wait in the garden. She then climbs to the roof and jumps to her death in front of Bobs. A black chick emerges from Diana's mouth and enters Bobs', making her an ongo. Back in Cebu, Diana's spirit bids her husband goodbye.

The film ends with Bobs alone in the woods collecting herbs while being watched over from afar by the spectre of Diana.

== Cast ==
- Eva Green as Christine
- Mark Strong as Felix
- Chai Fonacier as Diana
- Billie Gadsdon as Bobs
- Cathy Belton as Liz
- Anthony Falcon as Jomar
- Angie Ferro as Ongo

== Production ==
Principal photography began on February 1, 2021, in Dublin, Ireland.

As part of research for the film, director Lorcan Finnegan and screenwriter Garret Shanley went to the Philippine islands of Cebu and Siquijor, drawing parallels with Filipino and Irish experiences of colonialism and capitalism, as well as common beliefs in folklore and shamanism. Writer-director Ara Chawdhry helped write the scenes in the Philippines after she was recruited by producer Bianca Balbuena. Both then recommended Chai Fonacier to become part of the cast, citing her prior experience in Cebuano language films.

=== Music ===
The film's ending track featured the Filipino song Pugon (2016) by The General Strike, which references the 2015 Kentex slipper factory fire, the second worst fire incident in the Philippines to which the film's subplot is loosely based from. The end credits display the statement "JUSTICE FOR ALL KENTEX WORKERS" after mentioning the song's credits.

== Reception ==
On the review aggregator website Rotten Tomatoes, 71% of 59 critics' reviews are positive, with an average rating of 6.3/10. The website's consensus reads: "Nocebo struggles to consistently engage, but unsettling atmosphere and interesting ideas make this thriller difficult to dismiss outright." Metacritic, which uses a weighted average, assigned the film a score of 58 out of 100, based on 6 critics, indicating "mixed or average" reviews.
