= Lorcan Finnegan =

Irish film director and screenwriter

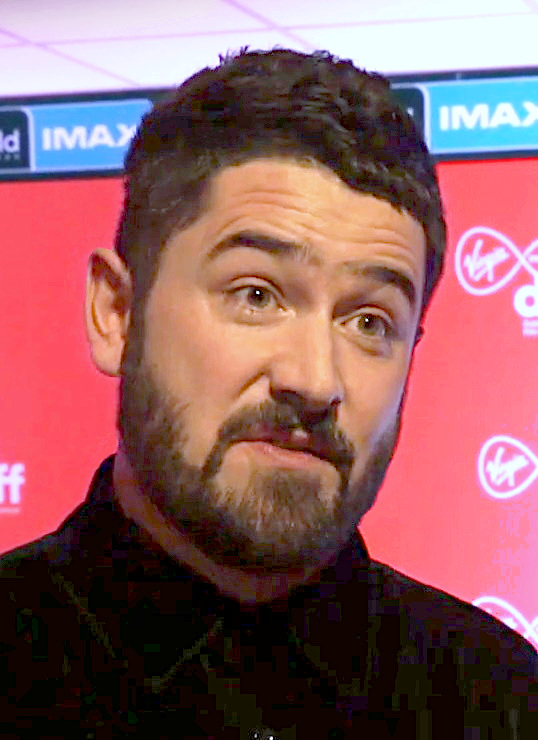
Lorcan Finnegan at DIFF 2020

Lorcan Finnegan is an Irish filmmaker, writer, producer and director. He is most notable for directing the film Vivarium (2019), which won the 2019 Cannes Film Festival Gan Foundation Support for Distribution award.

== Education and career ==
Lorcan Finnegan graduated with a master's degree in Graphic Design from his studies in Dublin. He began his professional career in London, joining Charlie Brooker's production company Zeppotron, which created the television series Black Mirror, where he worked as a designer, editor, and then director.

Returning to the Irish capital in 2004, he set up his own company Lovely Productions, and began to write and direct advertising films, music videos and short films. His transition to feature films was with the film Without Name (2016), a horror-tinged mystery, which premiered at the Toronto Film Festival in September 2016.

He directed the film Vivarium (2019), which starred Imogen Poots and Jesse Eisenberg, and won the 2019 Cannes Film Festival Gan Foundation Support for Distribution award.

He next directed Nocebo (2022) and The Surfer (2024), which starred Nicolas Cage, and was featured in the Limelight section of the 54th International Film Festival Rotterdam.

== Filmography ==
Short film

| Year | Title | Director | Writer |
|---|---|---|---|
| 2007 | Defaced | Yes | Yes |
| 2007 | Changes (Note: Also editor) | Yes | Yes |
| 2012 | Foxes | Yes | No |

Feature film

| Year | Title | Director | Executive Producer |
|---|---|---|---|
| 2016 | Without Name | Yes | No |
| 2019 | Vivarium (Note: Also story writer) | Yes | Yes |
| 2022 | Nocebo | Yes | No |
| 2024 | The Surfer | Yes | Yes |

Ref.:
