= Les Norton =

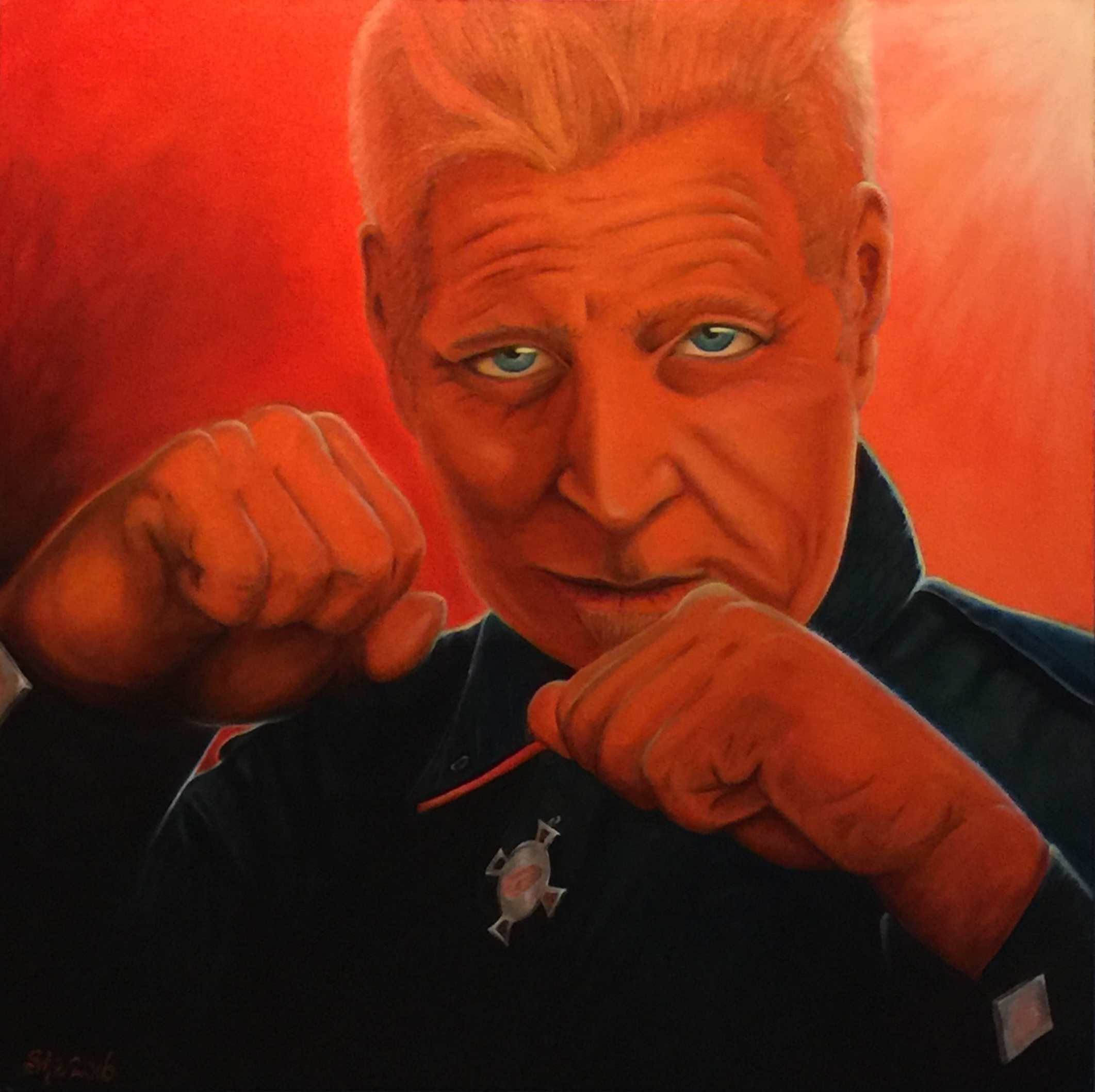
- First appearance: You Wouldn't Be Dead For Quids
- Last appearance: High Noon in Nimbin
- Created by: Robert G. Barrett
- Portrayed by: Alexander Bertrand

In-universe information
- Gender: Male
- Nationality: Australian

Les Norton is the protagonist in a series of fiction books written by Australian author Robert G. Barrett.

== Character ==
A likeable and laconic Aussie battler, Norton first appears in You Wouldn't Be Dead For Quids (1984) and is described as stockily built and red-haired who doesn't mind a fight, a punt or a root. He was born in Dirranbandi, and lived there until he was involved in a pub fight, when the local police officer told him to leave before investigators from Brisbane could arrive when he was identified as a person of interest in a subsequent murder investigation. He moved to Sydney, and ended up living in Bondi, working as a bouncer in an illegal casino in Kings Cross. In later books it turns from an illegal casino to a bridge club, as the club's owner Price Galese has further trouble bribing Police and Government officials to ignore the casino's presence. Les' career provides many opportunities for training, fighting, sex, dancing, photography, reflection and the odd mystery solving.

Les played rugby league for Easts during his early days in Sydney. He drives a 1968 Ford Falcon in the early stories, followed by "the Mighty Datto", a Datsun sedan which causes occasional friction with his sometime girlfriend "Tae Kwan Do Kate" Hannan. In later stories he drives a late model Holden Commodore Berlina that belonged to a man who was murdered in the car. Les tolerates the smell which persists despite having the car regularly detailed. In the later stories he has a house in Cox Avenue, Bondi which he shares with an advertising executive named Warren. Realising his employee's unwillingness to accept charity after saving him from a murder attempt, Price arranges for Les to purchase the house as a deceased estate much under the market rate.

== List of Les Norton Books (in chronological order) ==
- You Wouldn’t Be Dead for Quids (1985)
- The Real Thing (1986)
- The Boys From Binjiwunyawunya (1987)
- The Godson (1989)
- Between the Devlin and the Deep Blue Seas (1991)
- White Shoes, White Lines and Blackie (1992)
- And De Fun Don’t Dun (1993)
- Mele Kalikimaka Mr Walker (1994)
- The Day of The Gecko (1995)
- Rider on the Storm and Other Bits and Barrett (1996)
- Guns 'N' Rosé (1996)
- Mud Crab Boogie (1998)
- Goodoo Goodoo (1998)
- The Wind and the Monkey (1999)
- Leaving Bondi (2000)
- Mystery Bay Blues (2003)
- Rosa-Marie's Baby (2004)
- Crime Scene Cessnock (2005)
- Les Norton and the Case of the Talking Pie Crust (2007)
- High Noon in Nimbin (2010)

== Legacy ==
In 2000, the Avoca Beach Surf Life Saving Club launched one of its surfboats as the Les Norton.

In 2004, AAP reported that a film adaptation of Barrett's first book You Wouldn't Be Dead For Quids was to be made. Rugby league player Matthew Johns was slated to star in it, however, an actor for the lead role of Norton's character had not been found. In 2018, a 10-part television series titled Les Norton television series, adapted from the series of novels, was in production, starring Alexander Bertrand as Les Norton with David Wenham and Rebel Wilson. It first aired in August 2019 on ABC.
