= I Own the Racecourse =

- Directed by: Stephen Ramsey
- Written by: John Edwards; Stephen Ramsey
- Based on: novel by Patricia Wrightson
- Produced by: Paul Barron
- Starring: Gully Coote; Norman Kaye; Tony Barry; Bob Ellis
- Production company: Barron Films
- Distributed by: Village Roadshow (video); Network 7 TV
- Release date: 1985
- Running time: 76 minutes
- Country: Australia
- Language: English
- Budget: A$700,000

I Own the Racecourse is a 1985 Australian children's made-for-television film. It is based on the novel of the same title by children's author Patricia Wrightson.

== Synopsis ==
A developmentally delayed teenage boy believes he has bought a major Sydney racecourse for $20.

== Cast ==
- Gully Coote as Andy
- Tony Barry as Bert Hammond
- Bob Ellis as Renehan
- Brett Climo as Const. Eadie
- Gillian Jones as Mrs Hoddel
- Rob Steele as Evangelist
- Norman Kaye as Drunken Old Man
- Slim De Grey as Worker #1
- Kelly Dingwall
