= Robert G. Barrett =

Australian writer (1942–2012)

- Born: Robert George Barrett; 14 November 1942; Bondi, New South Wales, Australia
- Died: 20 September 2012 (aged 69); Terrigal, New South Wales, Australia
- Occupation: Writer

Robert George Barrett (14 November 1942 – 20 September 2012) was a popular Australian author of numerous books, most of them featuring the fictional Australian character Les Norton.

== Early life ==
Barrett was born and raised in Bondi, Sydney, where he worked mainly as a butcher. He left school at 14 to do a few odd jobs before taking on a trade as a butcher around the eastern suburbs of Sydney. He gave up his trade when a hind of beef fell on him and injured his shoulder. After 30 years he moved to Terrigal on the Central Coast of New South Wales. He appeared in a number of films and TV commercials but preferred to concentrate on his writing career.

== Best selling author ==
Just before his death, Barrett disclosed that the character "Les Norton" was based on two likeable Sydney "larrikin" identities, primarily his friend, Ken Wills (Willsy), a polyathlete who was a retired Sydney TRG/ water police officer, deep sea diver, first grade rugby league player for South Sydney in the mid 1970s, a professional boxer and a skiing gold medalist. The other character was an amateur boxer turned seaman/waterfront worker, William (Doogza) Davis, an underworld hard man.

Barrett worked as a DJ and his two friends worked as doormen at Randi Wix night club in Randwick, thinly veiled as the nightclub where Les Norton works in the tales. The nightclub in the books, the Kelly Club, is based on the Kellett Club, a small but well-known private casino in a terrace house in Kellett Street, Kings Cross. Both Doogsa and Willsy had associations with the Kellett club; Barrett did not. After work they would "grab drinks at the early opener at Kings Cross and swap stories" while Barrett jotted down the occasional note. A montage of these stories and the continuing life experiences of these two uniquely Australian individuals are what appears in the Les Norton series.

Barrett also wrote other single book stories. So What Do You Reckon? is a collection of his columns from when he was a columnist for the Australian People magazine. His books sold over 1,000,000 copies in Australia.

== Death ==
Barrett died at Terrigal, New South Wales, on 20 September 2012 after a long battle with bowel cancer.

== Books ==
=== Les Norton series ===
- You Wouldn’t Be Dead for Quids (1985)
- The Real Thing (1986)
- The Boys From Binjiwunyawunya (1987)
- The Godson (1989)
- Between the Devlin and the Deep Blue Seas (1991)
- White Shoes, White Lines and Blackie (1992)
- And De Fun Don’t Dun (1993)
- Mele Kalikimaka Mr Walker (1994)
- The Day of The Gecko (1995)
- Rider on the Storm and Other Bits and Barrett (1996)
- Guns 'N' Rosé (1996)
- Mud Crab Boogie (1998)
- Goodoo Goodoo (1998)
- The Wind and the Monkey (1999)
- Leaving Bondi (2000)
- Mystery Bay Blues (2003)
- Rosa-Marie's Baby (2004)
- Crime Scene Cessnock (2005)
- Les Norton and the Case of the Talking Pie Crust (2007)
- High Noon in Nimbin (2010)

=== Standalone novels ===
- Davo’s Little Something (1992)
- The Ultimate Aphrodisiac (2002)
- Trifecta (2004) (Omnibus combining Mud Crab Boogie, The Wind and the Monkey & So What Do You Reckon?)
- The Tesla Legacy (2006)
- Still Riding on the Storm (2011)

=== Non-fiction ===
- So What Do You Reckon? (1997)
