= Rush series 2 =

Rush
- Series 2
- No. of episodes: 22

Release
- Original network: Network Ten
- Original release: 16 July – 26 November 2009

Series chronology
- ← Previous; Series 1 Next → Series 3

Series 2 of police drama Rush premiered on 16 July 2009 on Network Ten. The second installments episode order was increased to twenty-two episodes up on thirteen from the first series. The second series continued to follow the lives of two teams employed with the prestigious Tactical Response Unit in Victoria, Australia.

Series 2 introduces a new main character Shannon Henry, a police negotiator who replaces Senior Constable Grace Barry after her death.

== Cast ==
=== Regular ===
- Rodger Corser as Senior Sergeant Lawson Blake
- Callan Mulvey as Sergeant Brendan "Josh" Joshua
- Jolene Anderson as Senior Constable Shannon Henry (from episode 1)
- Josef Ber as Sergeant Dominic "Dom" Wales
- Nicole da Silva as Constable Stella Dagostino
- Ashley Zukerman as Constable Michael Sandrelli
- Samuel Johnson as Intelligence Officer Leon Broznic
- Catherine McClements as Inspector Kerry Vincent

=== Special Guest Star ===
- Asher Keddie as Jacinta Burns
- Marny Kennedy as Amanda

=== Recurring ===
- Paul Ireland as Boyd Kemper
- Nathaniel Dean as Andrew Kronin
- Kate Jenkinson as Nina Wise
- Maia Thomas as Sandrine Wales
- Zen Ledden as Brian Marshall
- Rohan Nichol as Inspector David Napthorn
- Jacek Koman as Anton Buczek
- Adam Zwar as Marty Gero
- Luke Arnold as Constable Elliot Ryan

== Episodes ==
| No. overall | No. in season | Title | Directed by | Written by | Original release date | Australian viewers (millions) | Rank (weekly) |
|---|---|---|---|---|---|---|---|
| 14 | 1 | "Episode 1" | Daniel Nettheim | Adam Todd | 16 July 2009 | 1.167 | 25 |
When a container of illegal weapons is broken into, TR races to save the life of a security guard and attempt to find the men responsible.
| 15 | 2 | "Episode 2" | Kim Farrant | Alice Bell | 23 July 2009 | 1.145 | 31 |
A group of students are lured into being drug mules and TR races to stop them. As Lawson's determination to save them intensifies, Kerry warns him that he risks compromising a federal investigation.
| 16 | 3 | "Episode 3" | Daniel Nettheim | Christopher Lee | 30 July 2009 | 1.147 | 30 |
When TR is called to a domestic dispute, Lawson connects with a young boy struggling to care for his drunken father; Michael discovers being a hero isn't all it seems, despite the fact and he and Stella end up having sex in the changing rooms. And Shannon’s faith is tested by an encounter with a local prostitute.
| 17 | 4 | "Episode 4" | Michael Pattinson | Adam Todd & Andrew Prowse | 6 August 2009 | 1.228 | 19 |
When a family court judge is taken hostage by a disgruntled father, TR tries desperately for a peaceful resolution. As the situation escalates, Shannon is in a race to talk him down before Josh is forced to shoot him. Lawson’s attempts to catch a killer are hampered by journalist Jacinta Burns.
| 18 | 5 | "Episode 5" | Grant Brown | Adam Todd | 13 August 2009 | 1.206 | 37 |
During a routine cell extraction Dom and Stella are caught in a prison siege. Kerry looks at her phone while driving, and as soon as she looks up a cyclist hits the side of her car, goes flying over the side and later dies. When being questioned over the incident, Kerry leaves out the part about checking her mobile shortly before the cyclist ran into her.
| 19 | 6 | "Episode 6" | Grant Brown | Justin Monjo | 20 August 2009 | 1.115 | 34 |
When an ex-editor causes a disturbance at Federation Square, TR discovers a link to a series of TAB robberies. After a big night, Kerry finds herself in Leon's apartment, with a tattoo on her back and a head full of regret.
| 20 | 7 | "Episode 7" | Daniel Nettheim | Kris Mrksa | 27 August 2009 | 1.320 | 12 |
Two teenagers hoping for internet notoriety blow up a series of parking pay stations. Kerry rings Boyd while on 'holiday' at a Melbourne hotel, wanting to talk to him, but it doesn't go well.
| 21 | 8 | "Episode 8" | Stuart McDonald | Michelle Offen | 3 September 2009 | 1.036 | 39 |
Called to a siege in a town on the outskirts of Melbourne, TR find a man has been shot and a child abducted. They journey into dense bushland to rescue the boy only to discover he doesn’t want to be rescued, and is prepared to shoot anyone who tries.
| 22 | 9 | "Episode 9" | Grant Brown | Samantha Winston | 10 September 2009 | 1.136 | 27 |
Stella’s future in TR is threatened when she becomes involved in an illegal car race with her girlfriend. Kerry faces the inquest into the cyclist she accidentally hit. Later, Boyd visits Kerry at home with a peace offering and Dom finds a creative solution to an unusual situation.
| 23 | 10 | "Episode 10" | Daniel Nettheim | David Caesar & Adam Todd | 10 September 2009 | 1.107 | 30 |
On a new day, TR responds to a suspicious car tailing an armoured van. Michael goes against standard operating procedure taking on the robbers single-handedly. When the robbers discover their operation compromised, Michael finds his life in danger. Unable to holdback, Michael confesses his true feelings to Stella.But is crushed when she knocks him back.
| 24 | 11 | "Episode 11" | Kate Dennis | Todd Winston & Andrew Prowse | 17 September 2009 | 1.050 | 37 |
Josh is caught in the middle of a war between an ex-SAS soldier and a Major Crime investigation. Lawson tries to protect Jacinta when the story she is investigating puts her life in danger.
| 25 | 12 | "Episode 12" | Grant Brown | Christopher Lee | 24 September 2009 | 1.008 | 43 |
When a baby is abducted, TR races to find the kidnappers before the child’s grandfather, a known criminal figure, finds them first. Meanwhile, a man threatens to jump from an apartment building after his girlfriend goes missing.
| 26 | 13 | "Episode 13" | Daniel Nettheim | Christopher Lee & Alice Bell | 1 October 2009 | 0.944 | 44 |
When Shannon is assaulted by a taxi driver, Josh takes it on himself to find the driver and make him pay. TR responds to a disturbance at a swinger’s party only to discover the gatecrasher is a disabled woman. Josh is suspended for excessive use of force.
| 27 | 14 | "Episode 14" | Kim Farrant | Adam Todd & Meaghan Rodriguez | 8 October 2009 | 0.871 | 53 |
TR extracts undercover operative, Jessica North, from a drug syndicate. When she escapes, Lawson finds out that she is pregnant to a known criminal. They then race to track her down before her boyfriend discovers she is a cop.
| 28 | 15 | "Episode 15" | Grant Brown | Michelle Offen & Samantha Winston | 15 October 2009 | 0.909 | 57 |
TR races to save the lives of countless university students when two disgruntled teenagers go on a rampage with a crossbow after being dragged from their room and hung up in trees. Josh discovers a small attraction to Shannon while in his anger management classes.
| 29 | 16 | "Episode 16" | Daniel Nettheim | Alice Bell & Christopher Lee | 22 October 2009 | 0.975 | 48 |
Stella makes a critical error during a negotiation with an armed man that puts her girlfriend at risk. But when the man quotes a poster above Stella's bed, it gets even worse. Michael is forced to deliver a baby road-side, with help from Leon. Josh and Shannon stake out two hapless crooks as they plan an armed robbery.
| 30 | 17 | "Episode 17" | Kim Farrant | Rene Zandveld | 29 October 2009 | 0.890 | 53 |
Josh and Michael clash when dealing with a delusional man who thinks he's a drug squad detective. Lawson, Dom and Shannon intercept a call from a woman saying she's going to kill her husband. But when she winds up in a coma, her lover/student attempts to finish the job. Leon goes through a little phase - where he dresses in a shirt and tie; and illegally accesses his ex-girlfriends' phone numbers - because Nina dumped him.
| 31 | 18 | "Episode 18" | Grant Brown | Justin Monjo | 5 November 2009 | 0.826 | 68 |
Lawson and Josh come to blows when Lawson gets fed up with Josh bringing his personal life into work. TR tracks an escaped criminal who Josh believes has been wrongly imprisoned. Lawson tries to locate an elderly couple who were seen scoring drugs and have left suicide notes for their children.
| 32 | 19 | "Episode 19" | Daniel Nettheim | Steve Rodgers | 12 November 2009 | 0.948 | 42 |
Lawson tries to save Caleb from a life of crime only to discover it’s already too late. Dom’s home life explodes when Sandrine’s depression threatens to harm their baby. A bouncer at Goldfingers threatens the manager when he is forbidden to dance during business hours.
| 33 | 20 | "Episode 20" | John Hartley | Christopher Lee | 19 November 2009 | 0.830 | N/A |
It's Kerry's birthday, which leads the team into a bet on who will have "hot inspector sex" (as described by a hungover Michael) with her. Leon investigates a series of video store robberies, only to get caught up in one himself. Lawson and Josh chase a trio of bank robbers through a footy match at the MCG.
| 34 | 21 | "Episode 21" | Grant Brown | Samantha Winston | 26 November 2009 | 0.989 | N/A |
The team assists in the removal of underage girls from a community, where they find out that they have been sexually abused.
| 35 | 22 | "Episode 22" | Daniel Nettheim | Adam Todd | 26 November 2009 | 0.977 | N/A |
Melbourne’s water supply turned off after it is contaminated by a woman who believes that fluoride in the water has killed her husband. As the team wait for the ballistics report to come in, Stella clashes with Lawson.

== DVD release ==
The first volume of the second series of Rush, containing the first 12 episode of the series was released on 3 December 2009. The second volume, containing the back half of the series was released 1 April 2010.
