= Rush series 3 =

Rush
- Series 3
- No. of episodes: 22

Release
- Original network: Network Ten
- Original release: 22 July – 16 December 2010

Series chronology
- ← Previous; Series 2 Next → Series 4

Series 3 of police drama Rush premiered on 22 July 2010 on Network Ten. The third installment continues to follow the lives of two teams employed with the prestigious Tactical Response Unit in Victoria, Australia.

Series 3 introduces new characters Audrey Khoo (Camille Keenan), an intelligence officer working alongside Leon, and Christian Tapu (Kevin Hofbauer), a young constable who joins the team. Later in the season, Sergeant Dominic Wales dies in a bomb blast.

== Cast ==
=== Regular ===
- Rodger Corser as Senior Sergeant Lawson Blake
- Callan Mulvey as Sergeant Brendan "Josh" Joshua
- Jolene Anderson as Sergeant/Senior Constable Shannon Henry
- Josef Ber as Sergeant Dominic "Dom" Wales (until episode 5, guest stars in episode 16)
- Nicole da Silva as Senior Constable Stella Dagostino
- Ashley Zukerman as Senior Constable Michael Sandrelli
- Kevin Hofbauer as Constable Christian Tapu (from episode 1)
- Samuel Johnson as Intelligence Officer Leon Broznic
- Catherine McClements as Inspector Kerry Vincent

=== Recurring ===
- Camille Keenan as Intelligence Officer Audrey Khoo
- Nathaniel Dean as Andrew Kronin
- Ian Meadows as James Vincent
- Jane Allsop as Tash Button
- Ella Shenman as Minka Button

== Episodes ==
No. overall	No. in season	Title	Directed by	Written by	Original release date	Australian viewers (millions)	Rank (weekly)
36	1	"Heist"	Andrew Prowse	Adam Todd	22 July 2010	1.070	25
The Tactical Response team investigate an attack on a police helicopter and multiple car bombings, however only after time passes, they realize it is all part of a cunning plan to rob a money-holding accommodation, learning this, the teams pursue the case.
37	2	"Sniper"	Daina Reid	Adam Todd	29 July 2010	0.836	61
After a man is shot dead, the TR's investigation work alerts the teams to a gunman who has infiltrated an office building, however with numerous victims from both police and emergency workers alike, they struggle to find a motive for the shootings. Meanwhile Christian, Michael and Josh chase after a woman.
38	3	"Truck"	Daniel Nettheim	Samantha Winston	5 August 2010	0.983	42
Lawson's constant reminders of a case where money thieves escape him and his team without being caught threatens to tear apart the Tactical Response operations and TR2 help with the arrest of a well-known illegeal importer.
39	4	"Snatch"	Sian Davies	Alice Bell	12 August 2010	1.002	41
Tactical Response discovers a civilian involved with a lottery ticket scam with Andrew Kronin's gang which causes Dom to break-down and begin a shooting spree after Lawson refuses to help the civilian.
40	5	"CPP"	Andrew Prowse	Jeff Truman	19 August 2010	1.005	38
Christian is excited to be protecting one of his favorite childhood idols whilst he is on a visit to Australia. However he and the teams become concerned after it becomes obvious the prime-minister is being targeted by an assassin, and Dom is rejected by Lawson after he requests his job back.
41	6	"Brawl"	Daniel Nettheim	Jessica Redenbach	26 August 2010	0.798	72
Back on the job with Tactical Response, Stella helps to settle a violent ethnic dispute. But when one of the offenders takes a special liking to her, she's forced into a dangerous situation that truly puts her courage to the test. Meanwhile, Lawson is on the trail of a volatile young couple who are desperate to get married, and Josh receives a drunken phone call from teenage Minka, the daughter of his new love interest Tash.
42	7	"L'homme"	Daina Reid	Adam Todd	2 September 2010	0.668	83
As Tactical Response gather to move on armed robber Andrew Kronin and his men, Michael's foray into the world of underground fighting creates a dangerous complication when he is identified as a police officer by one of Kronin's crew and he quickly finds himself a marked man. Shannon later discovers Tactical Response are not the only group who want Kronin when she is caught in the middle of an attack on him by violent criminal associates.
43	8	"Train"	Grant Brown	Samantha Winston	9 September 2010	0.788	62
Tactical Response notice a runaway train relentlessly traveling through numerous stations along a crash course with another train. Lawson and Josh board the train to try to bring it safely to a halt.
44	9	"Cooked"	Andrew Prowse	Louise Fox	16 September 2010	0.776	65
A former drug user helps Tactical Response arrest a gang; however, a hostage situation breaks out after the former drug user's boyfriend breaks up with him. Kerry discovers her son, James, has a drug problem. Meanwhile, Josh is injured when being pursued by a hired assassin.
45	10	"Run"	Daniel Nettheim	Sam Carroll	23 September 2010	0.800	60
On Shannon's first day as a sergeant, her confidence is hurt after a juvenile delinquent steals the TR2 vehicle; however, while pursuing the criminal, she discovers he is skilled at evasion. Tragedy strikes, and Stella discovers she's pregnant.
46	11	"Hostage"	Michael Pattinson	John Ridley	30 September 2010	0.861	52
TR2 find themselves in a bizarre hostage situation when they must negotiate the return of a man's severed penis from his enraged partner. Having just cheated on Audrey with Stella, Michael wonders if this is karmic retribution as he struggles with the consequences of telling the truth. Meanwhile, Lawson is shocked to discover Kerry scoring drugs for her son. Michael finds out that Stella had a miscarriage with her implying that he was the father.
47	12	"Crash"	Andrew Prowse	Samantha Winston	21 October 2010	0.774	61
A cyber hacker manages to take down communications, businesses and banks across the city, bringing Josh and Tash together as they race against time to save the life of a badly injured woman. As the attack becomes more lethal, Leon and Audrey put their wits together to stop the faceless hacker.
48	13	"Series 3 Episode 13"	John Hartley	Jessica Redenbach	21 October 2010	0.689	75
After Andrew Kronin stages a brazen escape, Michael struggles with past demons as TR hunt down the armed robber and murderer. Burning for revenge, Michael is helped by Lawson to come to terms with his emotions.
49	14	"Series 3 Episode 14"	Ben Chessell	Adam Todd	28 October 2010	0.687	74
TR have a tough task when a group of Afghani asylum seekers seize the control of Frankston's Peninsula Centre and as a result, take several hostages, including the son of the Minister for Immigration.
50	15	"Series 3 Episode 15"	Sian Davies	Alice Bell & Todd Boland	4 November 2010	0.773	60
Most of the members of TR go to the bush for a routine training exercise. Unknown to Lawson and Josh, however, they soon find themselves at the mercy of Oliver Ginsberg, who has rigged the forest with deadly traps. When they discover that Ginsberg is on his way back to the city with a van full of explosives, they realise the worst is yet to come.
51	16	"Series 3 Episode 16"	David Caesar	Leon Ford	11 November 2010	0.708	69
Lawson and Dom must find themselves working together again as TR and the bomb squad try to find and disarm the explosives Oliver Ginsberg has planted under the city.
52	17	"Series 3 Episode 17"	Andrew Prowse	Jeff Truman	18 November 2010	0.707	63
Kerry is shocked when she receives a phone call saying that her son James has been arrested after being involved in a stoush during a flight back from Vietnam. Meanwhile Lawson refuses treatment when he is knocked down by a car after saving someone's life.
53	18	"Series 3 Episode 18"	Robert Connolly	Sam Carroll	25 November 2010	0.670	70
The Tactical Response team takes a newborn baby away from a crime family in order to protect the child from harm. After the family kills a police officer, Kerry sets out to destroy the crime syndicate.
54	19	"Series 3 Episode 19"	Sian Davies	John Ridley	25 November 2010	0.687	66
After a soldier escapes his confinements from the Military Police, the TR team search for the suspect around the barracks, though Christian soon finds himself held hostage by the soldier, trying to save a shot officer and faced with an ultimatum.
55	20	"Series 3 Episode 20"	Grant Brown	Alice Bell & Leon Ford	2 December 2010	0.936	22
Lawson and his team must watch over a reckless private security force in order to resolve their kidnapping case without another shooting incident. Shannon sleeps with Lawson. She discovers they were being filmed and Michael saw the tape.
56	21	"Proof"	Andrew Prowse	Jessica Redenbach & Adam Todd	9 December 2010	0.821	29
An informant from Josh's past tries to frame him with a crime he didn't commit. This sets off a chain reaction which threatens the lives of himself, his friends, Tash and her daughter.
57	22	"Series 3 Episode 22"	Ben Chessell	Samantha Winston	16 December 2010	0.910	16
After numerous distress calls and no communication from Baleen Island, the unit travel there to investigate. The team is personally rocked after they find Michael with a spear-gun wound. Shannon finds a boat to transport Michael, though she finds herself battling with a rogue officer while Michael hangs on for life with Stella at his side.

== DVD release ==
The first volume of the third series of Rush, containing the first 12 episode of the series was released on 3 December 2010. The second volume, containing the back half of the series was released on 3 March 2011.
