= Beyond the Darklands =

Beyond the Darklands is the name of two related television series:

- Beyond the Darklands (Australian TV series)
- Beyond the Darklands (New Zealand TV series)
