= Rush series 1 =

Rush
- Series 1
- No. of episodes: 13

Release
- Original network: Network Ten
- Original release: 2 September – 25 November 2008

Series chronology
- Next → Series 2

Series 1 of Australian police drama Rush premiered on 2 September 2008 on Network Ten. The series was commissioned partially due to the shortage of series caused by the 2007–2008 Writers Guild of America strike. It followed the lives of two teams employed with the prestigious Tactical Response Unit in Victoria, Australia.

The series first pilot was filmed in 2004 and had the working title of Rapid Response, additionally using an old Police Rescue script.

== Cast ==
=== Regular ===
- Rodger Corser as Senior Sergeant Lawson Blake
- Callan Mulvey as Sergeant Brendan "Josh" Joshua
- Claire van der Boom as Senior Constable Grace Barry (until episode 11)
- Josef Ber as Sergeant Dominic "Dom" Wales
- Nicole da Silva as Constable Stella Dagostino
- Ashley Zukerman as Constable Michael Sandrelli
- Samuel Johnson as Intelligence Officer Leon Broznic
- Catherine McClements as Inspector Kerry Vincent

=== Recurring ===
- Todd MacDonald as Connor Barry
- Kate Jenkinson as Nina Wise
- Maia Thomas as Sandrine Wales
- Zen Ledden as Brian Marshall
- Adam Zwar as Marty Gero

== Episodes ==
| No. overall | No. in season | Title | Directed by | Written by | Original release date | Australian viewers (millions) | Rank (weekly) |
|---|---|---|---|---|---|---|---|
| 1 | 1 | "Pilot" | Andrew Prowse | Christopher Lee | 2 September 2008 | 1.161 | 37 |
After rescuing two children, Josh's rage spills onto their father, who may have attempted to kill them. The new inspector challenges Josh's position on the team.
| 2 | 2 | "Series 1 Episode 2" | Geoff Bennett | Alice Bell | 9 September 2008 | 0.912 | 63 |
Lawson and Grace try to talk-down a troubled teenager when she threatens suicide, trapped on a rooftop with her young boyfriend. She was later found to have killed her boyfriend's father. Grace's inexperience is quickly revealed when she tries to fix the situation, which ends in the young woman jumping to her death.
| 3 | 3 | "Series 1 Episode 3" | Geoff Bennett | Justin Monjo | 16 September 2008 | 1.014 | 51 |
The TRG is called out to a sports oval, where a heavily armed gunman shoots Stella, who is saved by her kevlar vest. When the gunman requests to meet with a senior officer, Lawson approaches him and finds he was actually a former weapons-master who intends on suicide-by-cop. The situation ends when, after trying to avoid shooting him, Lawson is forced to shoot and kill the man when he pulls a handgun on him.
| 4 | 4 | "Series 1 Episode 4" | Erin White | John O'Brien & Christopher Lee | 23 September 2008 | 0.883 | 70 |
A criminal in custody escapes from the prison van he is being transported in, and makes an audacious break for freedom. In doing so, he assaults Grace and takes a woman hostage. He then forces Josh to drive him around town before playing a little Russian Roulette. However, Josh is saved and the criminal is arrested.
| 5 | 5 | "Series 1 Episode 5" | Erin White | Alice Bell | 30 September 2008 | 0.871 | 62 |
When the TR team intercepts a known drug dealer, they discover that a robbery is about to take place, which then turns into a siege when the robbers take hostages. One of the criminals falls into a basement beneath the bar and later dies. Dom goes in to try to convince the robbers to stop, but the owner of the bar is shot by a spear gun. Eventually, one of the criminals gives up while the other is arrested.
| 6 | 6 | "Series 1 Episode 6" | Andrew Prowse | Tim Alexander & Christopher Lee | 7 October 2008 | 0.833 | 70 |
Josh, Grace and Michael investigate when an alarm is going off at a high-security laboratory. They find that an animal rights activists group calling themselves 'Freedom From Torture' has freed almost all of the research animals from their cages. Michael is bitten by a monkey who is later found to have herpes.
| 7 | 7 | "Because I Got High" | Andrew Prowse | Shelley Birse | 14 October 2008 | 0.927 | 62 |
Michael is found cleared of the herpes. The team arrives at a big suburban party and find a group of teenagers have stolen a gun from a security guard. Stella and Michael then go undercover to try and retrieve the stolen weapon. Michael then saves a high school boy from being severely beaten by kids from a rival high school.
| 8 | 8 | "Get Lucky" | Geoff Bennet | Tony McNamara & Christopher Lee | 21 October 2008 | 0.969 | 50 |
When a politician’s daughter and her school friend are kidnapped, the team is asked to run a covert operation to get the girls back safely. After it goes wrong, the team discovers the daughter and her friend set the ransom up, before they need to be saved from a lying con-artist.
| 9 | 9 | "Series 1 Episode 9" | Geoff Bennett | Kylie Needham | 28 October 2008 | 0.941 | 50 |
Lawson is a part of a high speed chase involving a group of carjackers, Kerry is pulled over for drunk driving, and Josh, Grace and Michael are involved in a fatal car accident.
| 10 | 10 | "Series 1 Episode 10" | Emma Freeman | Alice Bell | 4 November 2008 | 0.886 | 55 |
TR is called to a media centre, where a man has locked himself in a room and has planted a number of paint bombs throughout the building. Michael is hit, but not injured. Dom discovers where the bombs really are, and he and Grace are both hospitalised after the explosions.
| 11 | 11 | "Series 1 Episode 11" | Emma Freeman | Justin Monjo | 11 November 2008 | 0.883 | 57 |
Lawson and Stella deal with a suicidal ex-footballer, Michael and Josh chase burglars through a series of complex tunnels, and Kerry is kept busy at the hospital where Dom and Grace are recovering. Grace unfortunately dies abruptly, while Connor confronts Josh after Grace revealed to him she was cheating on him with Josh.
| 12 | 12 | "Series 1 Episode 12" | Andrew Prowse | Christopher Lee | 18 November 2008 | 0.898 | 56 |
After a nasty domestic dispute, the TR team are called to look for a man, who has hospitalized his wife after an argument. The team reveals he has a gun, as well as his son. Lawson has the job of calling him down from a rooftop.
| 13 | 13 | "Series 1 Episode 13" | Andrew Prowse | Christoper Lee | 25 November 2008 | 0.846 | 61 |
TR is given the responsibility of protecting an underworld figure, who is testifying in court. A decoy is used, with an actor playing the man, but it goes downhill after the actor is shot dead. Several more attempts were made, and Kerry comes up with a unique way of protecting the man. Josh takes the man by himself, but is later cornered by the people trying to kill the underworld figure. As they leave, TR shows up and the men are arrested. The episode ends with Michael kissing Stella as she sleeps, and Kerry and Lawson having a conversation about the report on TR that Kerry wrote.

== DVD Releases ==
The entire first series Region 4 DVD was released on 30 July 2009.
