= Rush series 4 =

Rush
- Series 4
- No. of episodes: 13

Release
- Original network: Network Ten
- Original release: 1 September – 17 November 2011

Series chronology
- ← Previous; Series 3

Series 4 of police drama Rush premiered on 1 September 2011 with a double episode. The fourth instalment continues to follow the lives of the officers employed with the prestigious Tactical Response Unit in Victoria, Australia. Antony Starr joins the main cast as Senior Sergeant Charlie Lewis, the new boss. Senior Constable Michael Sandrelli (Ashley Zukerman) is fired from TR to go on an undercover mission.

== Cast ==
=== Regular ===
- Rodger Corser as Senior Sergeant Lawson Blake
- Callan Mulvey as Sergeant Brendan "Josh" Joshua
- Jolene Anderson as Sergeant Shannon Henry
- Antony Starr as Senior Sergeant Charlie Lewis (Antony Starr movies)
- Nicole da Silva as Senior Constable Stella Dagostino
- Ashley Zukerman as Senior Constable Michael Sandrelli (until episode 8)
- Kevin Hofbauer as Constable Christian Tapu
- Samuel Johnson as Intelligence Officer Leon Broznic
- Catherine McClements as Superintendent Kerry Vincent

=== Recurring ===
- Jane Allsop as Tash Button
- Ella Shenman as Minka Button
- Ian Meadows as James Vincent
- Emily Wheaton as Amber Cushing
- Elle Mandalis as Anna Vargas
- Peter Hardy as Doug Rainey
- Mark Leonard Winter as Liam Rainey

== Episodes ==
No. overall	No. in season	Title	Directed by	Written by	Original release date	Australian viewers (millions)	Rank (weekly)
58	1	"New World Order"	Andrew Prowse	Christopher Lee	1 September 2011	0.778	38
With the assassination of the Victorian Police Minister, a special taskforce is set up, called Cicero, which includes TR and other forces, and Kerry is asked to head it up. She is forced by the new Minister, Anna Vargas, to take on a man named Charlie Lewis, and to make him the Senior Officer in Charge (SIO), even over Lawson. This causes tension between Lawson and Kerry. Meanwhile, Charlie wastes no time in throwing his weight around, firing Michael on the spot. Stella, Josh and Lawson all attempt to get him his job back, but it is revealed that Kerry was the one who wanted him gone in the first place.
59	2	"Escort"	Daina Reid	Samantha Winston	1 September 2011	0.719	49
Shannon is attacked in the streets at night, and begins to meltdown, which culminates in her letting the girlfriend of the hitman hired to kill the Minister, who TR needs to know who ordered the hit, go free because she is pregnant. And Leon hires his niece, Amber, as his new assistant, who simply needs the job for the money.
60	3	"Escort, Part 2"	Daina Reid	Christopher Lee	8 September 2011	0.631	64
Kerry is furious that Shannon allowed Lexi to escape and orders her to attend a counselling session. What buried issues will be uncovered?
61	4	"Lion"	John Hartley	Adam Todd	15 September 2011	0.660	57
Conflicting agendas in the team bring simmering tensions to the boil. Best mates Lawson and Josh are up against new boss Charlie and their superior Kerry. Stella, Christian and Charlie help save the life of a journalist, whose reporting has got her into trouble.
62	5	"Threats"	Geoff Bennett	Ben Chessell	22 September 2011	0.753	51
Tactical Response take charge of Kerry's protection after she receives a death threat. Headstrong Kerry is dismissive of her own safety but when the threats are redirected to her son; her anger at the perpetrators can't be contained. Despite her attempts to hide her son, they still manage to track him down and take him, leaving her distraught.
63	6	"In His Nature"	Ben Chessell	Christopher Lee, Vanessa Bates & Michael Boland	29 September 2011	0.665	60
Michael Sandrelli has been a busy man since being fired from TR. Thanks to the squad's head honcho Kerry, he's now undercover, and his job is to bring down a family of cocaine importers.
64	7	"Survival"	Grant Brown	Adam Todd	6 October 2011	0.660	65
It's a race against time as Kerry fights political red tape, whilst the remaining members of TR do anything they can to get one of their team back safely.
65	8	"Life Support"	Daina Reid	Keith Thompson	13 October 2011	0.651	70
Senior Constable Michael Sandrelli remains in intensive care whilst TR are left to pick up the pieces. Meanwhile, Shannon lets her emotional guard down.
66	9	"Explosives"	Darren Ashton	Tim Dylan Lee & Michael Boland	20 October 2011	0.617	TBA
A tragedy occurs in the tactical response team, leaving them struggling to face the day. Those left are forced to concentrate on the job at hand.
67	10	"The Cuckoo"	Ben Chessell	Leon Ford	27 October 2011	0.573	TBA
The team pursue the man they believe is responsible for Michael's death and Josh's disappearance. But the closer they get to him, the quicker he slips away.
68	11	"Kiss"	Grant Brown	Samantha Winston	3 November 2011	0.677	TBA
Ridden by the guilt of letting a fellow TR member die on his watch, Josh has gone underground, working to his own agenda and leaving the task force to pick up the pieces.
69	12	"Mortality"	Adrian Wills	Michael Boland & Jonathan Gavin	10 November 2011	0.730	TBA
Lawson and TR are on the trail of the 'Cuckoo', a Russian fugitive planning to unleash terrorist-like chaos across the Melbourne cityscape. Also, things get a little romantic for Shannon and Lawson.
70	13	"Dirty Bomb"	Andrew Prowse	Adam Todd	17 November 2011	0.512	TBA
Lawson, Christian and Shannon are sent to Fiji to extradite a known fugitive back to the country so that he can disarm the dirty bomb found in central Melbourne.
