= Giarratano =

Giarratano is a surname. It may refer to the following notable people:

- Joseph Giarratano (born 1956), American inmate
- Leah Giarratano, Australian psychologist
- Nino Giarratano (born 1962), American college baseball coach
- Tony Giarratano (born 1982), American baseball player
