= Bush Doctors =

Australian television series

- Genre: Reality
- Developed by: DSP Beyond
- Narrated by: Jolene Anderson
- Country of origin: Australia
- No. of episodes: 7

Production
- Executive producer: Alex Hodgekinson
- Producers: Tim Thatcher and Kylie McCarroll
- Production locations: New South Wales, Australia

Original release
- Network: Seven Network
- Release: 3 February – 16 March 2008

Related
- Medical Emergency, The Force, Border Security

Bush Doctors is a seven-part Australian reality television series centred on the lives of a medical team at a rural hospital in Dubbo, New South Wales. It debuted on the Seven Network on 3 February 2008 and was narrated by All Saints star Jolene Anderson.

This was her last show on channel 7 and she moved to Channel 10 to star in Rush.
