= Port Phillip Prison =

Prison in Victoria, Australia

Coordinates: 37°49′42″S 144°45′8″E

- Interactive map of Port Phillip Prison
- Location: Truganina, Victoria
- Status: Partially operational
- Security class: Maximum (Male)
- Capacity: 1117, as at 30 June 2019
- Opened: September 1997; 29 years ago
- Closed: December 2025; 11 months ago (1117 bed facility)

Port Phillip Prison is a maximum security prison facility located at Truganina, Victoria, Australia. It was Victoria's largest maximum security prison, able to accommodate up to 1117 prisoners. The prison's primary facilities were closed in December 2025, though a 20 bed acute psychiatric ward was retained on site. The prison was privately operated on behalf of the Government of Victoria by G4S Australia Pty Ltd. Most prisoners were relocated to the Western Plains Correctional Centre in Lara, which opened in 2025.

== History ==
Originally cited to be called Metropolitan Men's Prison the facility was renamed prior to its opening to Port Phillip Prison. The facility was the third privately operated prison to open in Victoria. The prison was criticised for being constructed with multiple hanging points in cells, against the recommendations of the Royal Commission into Aboriginal Deaths in Custody. It was estimated that 1,070 of the 1,200 cells had exposed hanging points in breach of the recommendations. Port Phillip Prison received its first prisoners on 10 September 1997.

The first suicide by hanging at the prison occurred within a month of its opening, and four suicides by hanging occurred within the first two years. The prison was plagued by issues of staff shortage and suicide attempts, with the officers union stating they had received multiple complaints about the management of the prison. Commenting on the lack of accountability at private prisons, Justice Frank Vincent, the chairman of the parole board, stated that "Regrettably, the current situation was not only predictable, it was predicted".

At a coronial inquest into one of the deaths which occurred in December 1997, a former prison officer on duty at the time of the death testified that prison officers often fabricated records for when they were supposed to check on prisoners on suicide watch, and would often neglect duties while prisoners were sleeping, on occasion by making prank calls and trying to wake prisoners up via the intercom system. In April 2000, the coroner found that G4S and Corrections Victoria had contributed to four suicides by failing to minimise hanging points in the construction of the prison. In 2014, the Victorian Ombudsman found that Corrections Victoria had still failed to comply with the recommendations of the state coroner by removing hanging points from cells. The Department of Justice responded by saying they were not required to comply with the recommendations of the coroner.

G4S confirmed that a prison officer resigned in April 2016 after 100 weapons were seized from his home by Victoria Police as part of an ongoing investigation into firearms offences.

In 2022, a 16-year-old boy was held in maximum security for almost four months, against advice from the sentencing judge, during which time he was routinely held in isolation and confined to his cell for 23 hours a day.

== Accommodation units ==
The prison consists of 13 accommodation units including a youth unit named Penhyn for young adult inmates aged 18–25 who are first time offenders only with no criminal record. All other under 25 prisoners are sent to mainstream units. The induction unit named Matilda is divided into two and all prisoners spend time there before being located to other accommodation units. Cells within the units have a shower, hand basin, toilet, desk, chair, television, storage shelves, intercom and bed.

The prison operates a 20-bed inpatient hospital unit.

== Notable prisoners ==
- Julian Knight, perpetrator of the 1987 Hoddle Street massacre.
- Jason Joseph Roberts, convicted of the Silk–Miller police murders.
- Paul Denyer, the 'Frankston Serial Killer', moved to Hopkins correctional centre in 2003
- Blair Cottrell, Chairman of the United Patriots Front, convicted of stalking and arson.
- Peter Dupas, convicted serial killer.
