= The Politically Incorrect Parenting Show =

- Genre: Factual entertainment
- Presented by: Nigel Latta
- Country of origin: Australia
- Original language: English
- No. of seasons: 1
- No. of episodes: 3

Production
- Running time: 20 minutes

Original release
- Network: Nine Network
- Release: 2010

The Politically Incorrect Parenting Show is an Australian television program which is a remake of the New Zealand television program of the same name. The Australian version was filmed in Sydney from 16 to 25 February 2010. It was hosted by Nigel Latta, a New Zealand-born psychologist, who has written several books on parenting. It aired on the Nine Network.

== Reception ==
The Sydney Morning Herald television critic Bridget McManus called the program "a confusing melange of comedy and practical parenting advice" and compared it to "a glossy PowerPoint presentation". The Centralian Advocate thought that the series was an "entertaining and enlightening" of making contemporary parenting more sensible.

David Knox of The Sun-Herald found it "pointless" and "cheaply made", while Greg Hassall of The Sydney Morning Herald said it had "mildly irritating routines" and was "very disjointed". The Daily Telegraph called it "an entertainingly irreverent guide" of how to raise children. Herald Sun reviewer Cameron Adams thought Latta's had "lame jokes". Naomi Toy of Woman's Day reviewed the program.
