= List of Rush episodes =

The following is a list of episodes for the Australian television programme Rush on Network Ten.

== Series overview ==
Series	Episodes	Originally released	
Series	Episodes	First released	Last released
1	13	2 September 2008	25 November 2008
2	22	16 July 2009	26 November 2009
3	22	22 July 2010	16 December 2010
4	13	1 September 2011	17 November 2011

== Episodes ==
=== Series 1 (2008) ===
No. overall	No. in season	Title	Directed by	Written by	Original release date	Australian viewers (millions)	Rank (weekly)
1	1	"Pilot"	Andrew Prowse	Christopher Lee	2 September 2008	1.161	37
2	2	"Series 1 Episode 2"	Geoff Bennett	Alice Bell	9 September 2008	0.912	63
3	3	"Series 1 Episode 3"	Geoff Bennett	Justin Monjo	16 September 2008	1.014	51
4	4	"Series 1 Episode 4"	Erin White	John O'Brien & Christopher Lee	23 September 2008	0.883	70
5	5	"Series 1 Episode 5"	Erin White	Alice Bell	30 September 2008	0.871	62
6	6	"Series 1 Episode 6"	Andrew Prowse	Tim Alexander & Christopher Lee	7 October 2008	0.833	70
7	7	"Because I Got High"	Andrew Prowse	Shelley Birse	14 October 2008	0.927	62
8	8	"Get Lucky"	Geoff Bennet	Tony McNamara & Christopher Lee	21 October 2008	0.969	50
9	9	"Series 1 Episode 9"	Geoff Bennett	Kylie Needham	28 October 2008	0.941	50
10	10	"Series 1 Episode 10"	Emma Freeman	Alice Bell	4 November 2008	0.886	55
11	11	"Series 1 Episode 11"	Emma Freeman	Justin Monjo	11 November 2008	0.883	57
12	12	"Series 1 Episode 12"	Andrew Prowse	Christopher Lee	18 November 2008	0.898	56
13	13	"Series 1 Episode 13"	Andrew Prowse	Christoper Lee	25 November 2008	0.846	61

=== Series 2 (2009) ===
No. overall	No. in season	Title	Directed by	Written by	Original release date	Australian viewers (millions)	Rank (weekly)
14	1	"Episode 1"	Daniel Nettheim	Adam Todd	16 July 2009	1.167	25
15	2	"Episode 2"	Kim Farrant	Alice Bell	23 July 2009	1.145	31
16	3	"Episode 3"	Daniel Nettheim	Christopher Lee	30 July 2009	1.147	30
17	4	"Episode 4"	Michael Pattinson	Adam Todd & Andrew Prowse	6 August 2009	1.228	19
18	5	"Episode 5"	Grant Brown	Adam Todd	13 August 2009	1.206	37
19	6	"Episode 6"	Grant Brown	Justin Monjo	20 August 2009	1.115	34
20	7	"Episode 7"	Daniel Nettheim	Kris Mrksa	27 August 2009	1.320	12
21	8	"Episode 8"	Stuart McDonald	Michelle Offen	3 September 2009	1.036	39
22	9	"Episode 9"	Grant Brown	Samantha Winston	10 September 2009	1.136	27
23	10	"Episode 10"	Daniel Nettheim	David Caesar & Adam Todd	10 September 2009	1.107	30
24	11	"Episode 11"	Kate Dennis	Todd Winston & Andrew Prowse	17 September 2009	1.050	37
25	12	"Episode 12"	Grant Brown	Christopher Lee	24 September 2009	1.008	43
26	13	"Episode 13"	Daniel Nettheim	Christopher Lee & Alice Bell	1 October 2009	0.944	44
27	14	"Episode 14"	Kim Farrant	Adam Todd & Meaghan Rodriguez	8 October 2009	0.871	53
28	15	"Episode 15"	Grant Brown	Michelle Offen & Samantha Winston	15 October 2009	0.909	57
29	16	"Episode 16"	Daniel Nettheim	Alice Bell & Christopher Lee	22 October 2009	0.975	48
30	17	"Episode 17"	Kim Farrant	Rene Zandveld	29 October 2009	0.890	53
31	18	"Episode 18"	Grant Brown	Justin Monjo	5 November 2009	0.826	68
32	19	"Episode 19"	Daniel Nettheim	Steve Rodgers	12 November 2009	0.948	42
33	20	"Episode 20"	John Hartley	Christopher Lee	19 November 2009	0.830	N/A
34	21	"Episode 21"	Grant Brown	Samantha Winston	26 November 2009	0.989	N/A
35	22	"Episode 22"	Daniel Nettheim	Adam Todd	26 November 2009	0.977	N/A

=== Series 3 (2010) ===
No. overall	No. in season	Title	Directed by	Written by	Original release date	Australian viewers (millions)	Rank (weekly)
36	1	"Heist"	Andrew Prowse	Adam Todd	22 July 2010	1.070	25
37	2	"Sniper"	Daina Reid	Adam Todd	29 July 2010	0.836	61
38	3	"Truck"	Daniel Nettheim	Samantha Winston	5 August 2010	0.983	42
39	4	"Snatch"	Sian Davies	Alice Bell	12 August 2010	1.002	41
40	5	"CPP"	Andrew Prowse	Jeff Truman	19 August 2010	1.005	38
41	6	"Brawl"	Daniel Nettheim	Jessica Redenbach	26 August 2010	0.798	72
42	7	"L'homme"	Daina Reid	Adam Todd	2 September 2010	0.668	83
43	8	"Train"	Grant Brown	Samantha Winston	9 September 2010	0.788	62
44	9	"Cooked"	Andrew Prowse	Louise Fox	16 September 2010	0.776	65
45	10	"Run"	Daniel Nettheim	Sam Carroll	23 September 2010	0.800	60
46	11	"Hostage"	Michael Pattinson	John Ridley	30 September 2010	0.861	52
47	12	"Crash"	Andrew Prowse	Samantha Winston	21 October 2010	0.774	61
48	13	"Series 3 Episode 13"	John Hartley	Jessica Redenbach	21 October 2010	0.689	75
49	14	"Series 3 Episode 14"	Ben Chessell	Adam Todd	28 October 2010	0.687	74
50	15	"Series 3 Episode 15"	Sian Davies	Alice Bell & Todd Boland	4 November 2010	0.773	60
51	16	"Series 3 Episode 16"	David Caesar	Leon Ford	11 November 2010	0.708	69
52	17	"Series 3 Episode 17"	Andrew Prowse	Jeff Truman	18 November 2010	0.707	63
53	18	"Series 3 Episode 18"	Robert Connolly	Sam Carroll	25 November 2010	0.670	70
54	19	"Series 3 Episode 19"	Sian Davies	John Ridley	25 November 2010	0.687	66
55	20	"Series 3 Episode 20"	Grant Brown	Alice Bell & Leon Ford	2 December 2010	0.936	22
56	21	"Proof"	Andrew Prowse	Jessica Redenbach & Adam Todd	9 December 2010	0.821	29
57	22	"Series 3 Episode 22"	Ben Chessell	Samantha Winston	16 December 2010	0.910	16

=== Series 4 (2011) ===
On 12 November 2010, Network Ten renewed Rush for a 13 episode, fourth series to air from 1 September 2011.

No. overall	No. in season	Title	Directed by	Written by	Original release date	Australian viewers (millions)	Rank (weekly)
58	1	"New World Order"	Andrew Prowse	Christopher Lee	1 September 2011	0.778	38
59	2	"Escort"	Daina Reid	Samantha Winston	1 September 2011	0.719	49
60	3	"Escort, Part 2"	Daina Reid	Christopher Lee	8 September 2011	0.631	64
61	4	"Lion"	John Hartley	Adam Todd	15 September 2011	0.660	57
62	5	"Threats"	Geoff Bennett	Ben Chessell	22 September 2011	0.753	51
63	6	"In His Nature"	Ben Chessell	Christopher Lee, Vanessa Bates & Michael Boland	29 September 2011	0.665	60
64	7	"Survival"	Grant Brown	Adam Todd	6 October 2011	0.660	65
65	8	"Life Support"	Daina Reid	Keith Thompson	13 October 2011	0.651	70
66	9	"Explosives"	Darren Ashton	Tim Dylan Lee & Michael Boland	20 October 2011	0.617	TBA
67	10	"The Cuckoo"	Ben Chessell	Leon Ford	27 October 2011	0.573	TBA
68	11	"Kiss"	Grant Brown	Samantha Winston	3 November 2011	0.677	TBA
69	12	"Mortality"	Adrian Wills	Michael Boland & Jonathan Gavin	10 November 2011	0.730	TBA
70	13	"Dirty Bomb"	Andrew Prowse	Adam Todd	17 November 2011	0.512	TBA

== Ratings ==
Rush : Australia viewers per episode (thousands)

Season	Episode number																						Average
Season	1	2	3	4	5	6	7	8	9	10	11	12	13	14	15	16	17	18	19	20	21	22	Average
1	1161	912	1014	883	871	833	927	969	941	886	883	898	846	–									925
2	1167	1145	1147	1228	1206	1115	1320	1036	1136	1107	1050	1008	944	871	909	975	890	826	948	830	989	977	1037
3	1070	836	983	1002	1005	798	668	788	776	800	861	774	689	687	773	708	707	670	687	936	821	910	781
4	778	719	631	660	753	665	660	651	617	573	667	730	513	–									664

Source: Audience measurement performed by OzTam
