= Beyond the Darklands (Australian TV series) =

- Genre: True crime
- Based on: Beyond the Darklands
- Presented by: Dr Leah Giarratano
- Narrated by: Samuel Johnson
- Country of origin: Australia
- Original language: English
- No. of seasons: 1
- No. of episodes: 9

Production
- Running time: approx. 45 min.

Original release
- Network: Seven Network
- Release: 18 March – 14 September 2009

Beyond the Darklands is an Australian true crime television series that aired on the Seven Network. It was based on the New Zealand series of the same name and a book created by the New Zealand clinical psychologist Nigel Latta. The TVNZ series has been shown in Australia on the CI channel on Foxtel.

== Overview ==
The series was narrated by Samuel Johnson, with each episode focusing on a certain criminal (usually a murderer or team of murderers), with commentary from clinical psychologist Dr Leah Giarratano providing insight into the minds of the criminal(s).

After screening the first four episodes in early 2009, the show was taken off the air, only to return later that year for a further five episodes. Via a phone call on 11 November 2009, a Channel Seven spokesperson confirmed that the show was meant to be returning in the New Year with new episodes. Due to a court injunction, Channel Seven was prevented from screening the episode featuring Peter Dupas in Victoria.

== Episodes ==
Episode	Air date	Case
1	18 March 2009	David and Catherine Birnie
2	25 March 2009	Andrew "Benji" Veniamin
3	1 April 2009	William Matheson (In late 2003, he murdered his ex-girlfriend, Lyndsay Van Blanken. He strangled the 18-year-old with cable ties before dumping her body in an abandoned storeroom. That same night he played the cello in front of an audience of thousands without emotion. Known for his bizarre behaviour, Matheson would spend nights wandering city streets scavenging for dead animals or sifting through rubbish.)
4	19 April 2009	Bega schoolgirl murders
5	17 August 2009	Neddy Smith (and Roger Rogerson).
6	24 August 2009	Bilal Skaf
7	31 August 2009	Peter Dupas
8	7 September 2009	Katherine Knight
9	14 September 2009	Terrance John Clark
