= You've Been Scammed =

New Zealand television series

- Created by: Nigel Latta
- Country of origin: New Zealand

Original release
- Release: 3 July 2023

You've Been Scammed by Nigel Latta is a New Zealand television programme which teaches its audience about scams. It is hosted by psychologist and television host Nigel Latta, and has four episodes. The programme details eight types of scams and the human weaknesses they exploit. Several scammers were contacted within the programme, and several victims of scams were interviewed, including a woman who lost $100,000. Latta compared scammers to magicians within the show. Magician Brendan Dooley featured within the programme, who carries out scams on unsuspecting victims. The programme was first aired on TVNZ 1 on 3 July 2023 at 8 pm.

== Description ==
The production team made multiple contacts with scammers for the programme. Latta said that a scammer "sound[ed] very plausible, very believable and very convincing," saying that "We knew he was a scammer but in the middle of that conversation even we were starting to doubt ourselves".

The opening sequence of the programme features a hooded figure surrounded by code. The Spinoff described the theme tune as "a powerful dubstep beat drop that will really get you in the mood to squash some scammers".

The programme included safety expert Sean Lyons from Netsafe and cybersecurity specialist Daniel Watson. The programme interviewed victims of scams who included a woman who lost $100,000, a woman in her 60s who started blowing referee whistles into the phone when she receives calls from unknown numbers, and a lawyer in her 30s who fell for an Instagram story claiming to be a cash prize draw. Podcaster Frances Cook was also featured on the programme, who talked about the people impersonating her in attempt to scam her followers.

On the first episode the magician appears and acts as if he is a sound engineer. While he places microphones on the victims he steals their ties and watches. Further on in the episode, Latta sets up a fake website for the programme's production company. It was used to carry out a phishing scam, emailing people to provide credit card details to prepay parking. These emails included a misspelling of Latta's name, which victims dismissed. The production team asked participants for four-digit numbers and scoured their social media profiles. Latta then used this information to act as a mind-reader, which appeared magical to the participants. He then guessed their bank PINs using the four-digit numbers.
