= Connie Johnson (fundraiser) =

Australian philanthropist (1977–2017)

Connie Johnson OAM
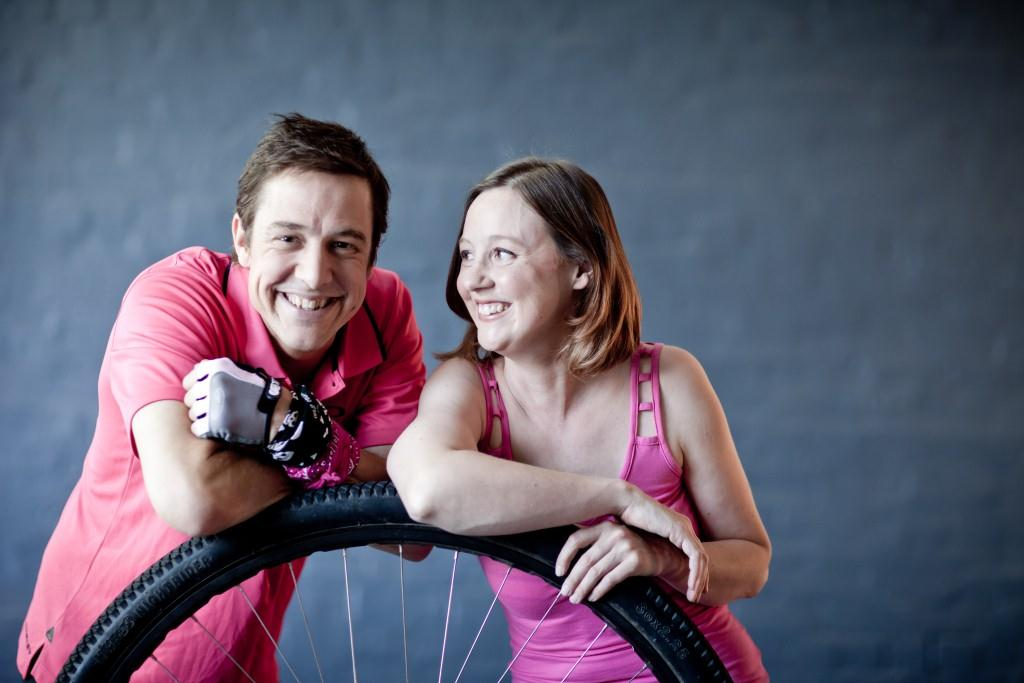
- Samuel and Connie Johnson
- Born: Constance Johnson; 1977
- Died: 8 September 2017 (aged 40); Canberra, Australian Capital Territory
- Known for: Founder of the Love Your Sister charity; Receiving the Medal of the Order of Australia for services to breast cancer research
- Relatives: Samuel Johnson (brother); Hilde Hinton (sister)

Constance "Connie" Johnson OAM (1977 – 8 September 2017) was an Australian philanthropist. She suffered from bone cancer at age 11, uterine cancer at age 22 and finally breast cancer at age 33. Johnson founded the Love Your Sister charity in 2012 with her brother Samuel Johnson, aiming to raise $10 million for cancer research. At the time of her death the charity had raised almost $6 million. She was awarded the Medal of the Order of Australia on 7 September 2017 and died the following day, aged 40.

== Biography ==
Johnson was born in 1977 and grew up with older sister Hilde and younger brother Samuel. Their mother committed suicide when Connie was aged 4. She started at a new school almost every year; her father was a writer and moved around a lot so that he could write. At the age of 22 she met her husband Mike and in 2001 they moved to Canberra where they ran the Book Lore bookshop in Lyneham together. They married in 2004 and Mike took her name. They had two sons; Willoughby in 2006 and Hamilton in 2007.

Johnson was first diagnosed with bone cancer in her leg at age 11. At the age of 22, she was diagnosed with uterine cancer. Both tumours were detected early which aided successful treatment. In 2010, at the age of 33, after being misdiagnosed by three doctors, Johnson was told she had breast cancer. The cancer spread to her lungs, liver, spine, pelvis and knee. She was given six to twelve months to live. Johnson joined with her brother, Samuel Johnson, to start the Love Your Sister charity on New Year's Day 2012, and to co-write a book titled Love Your Sister: How far would you go for someone you love? which was published in November 2016.

In April 2017, she announced that her body could no longer withstand her medications and she was ceasing all treatment, and withdrew from public life shortly afterwards. Johnson was presented with the Medal of the Order of Australia on 7 September 2017, by the Governor-General Sir Peter Cosgrove; for services to people with breast cancer. The medal was to be presented on Australia Day 2018, but the ceremony was brought forward due to Johnson's poor health. Johnson's death was announced by Samuel the following day on the Love Your Sister Facebook page.

== Love Your Sister ==
Johnson started the Love Your Sister Charity on New Years Day 2012 with her brother Samuel. The charity funds medical research grants around Australia, including a long-standing relationship with the Garvan Institute of Medical Research where a lab was named for her.

In February 2013 Samuel left Melbourne on his unicycle and rode a world record 15,000 kilometres (9,320.57 mi) around Australia in an effort to raise one million dollars for Love Your Sister. The ride ended after 364 days in February 2014 and raised almost $1.5 million.

The Big Heart Project aimed to break the record for the longest line of coins, but when they were inundated with donations the plans changed; they created a heart that people could fill with buckets of 5 cent coins. The project raised $2.535 million for the charity. $200,000 was donated to The Cancer Support Group (formerly The Eden Monaro Cancer Support Group).

Charitable donations received via the Love Your Sister website and the Not Another XXXXing Swear Jar campaign increased the funds raised by the charity to $5.6 million at the time of Johnson's death. The charity persists after Johnson's death, continuing her assurance that the charity will not use donated funds for its operational costs and that the donations fund research grants only. Love Your Sister reached $20 million raised in February 2025.

== Awards ==
- Medal of the Order of Australia

== Books ==
- Love Your Sister: How far would you go for someone you love?, Hachette Australia, 29 November 2016 ISBN 9780733637490
