= After the Deluge (film) =

2003 Australian television miniseries

- Written by: Andrew Knight; Deb Cox
- Directed by: Brendan Maher
- Starring: Ray Barrett; David Wenham; Hugo Weaving; Samuel Johnson
- Theme music composer: Cezary Skubiszewski
- Country of origin: Australia
- Original language: English

Production
- Producers: Richard Keddie; Andrew Knight; Andrew Wiseman
- Cinematography: Geoff Burton
- Editor: Uri Mizrahi
- Running time: 194 minutes
- Production company: CoxKnight Productions

Original release
- Network: Network Ten
- Release: June 2003

After the Deluge is a 2003 Australian television miniseries starring Ray Barrett, David Wenham, Hugo Weaving and Samuel Johnson. It was first broadcast by Channel Ten in two parts in June 2003.

== Cast ==
- David Wenham as Alex Kirby
- Hugo Weaving as Martin 'Marty' Kirby
- Samuel Johnson as Toby Kirby
- Aden Young as Young Cliff
- Ray Barrett as Old Cliff Kirby
- Catherine McClements as Nikki Kirby
- Essie Davis as Beth
- Rachel Griffiths as Annie
- Kate Beahan as Margaret
- Vince Colosimo as Eric
- Marta Dusseldorp as Eva
- Bob Franklin as Sid
- Marco Chiappi as Bevan
- Simon Burke as Michael
- Tara Morice as Dianne
- Emily Browning as Maddy
- Dominic Smith as Schoolboy
- Sue Jones as Landlady

== Story ==
Cliff, a former music teacher, is stricken with Alzheimer's and is living in a nursing home. His three sons, with whom he has had a difficult, at times estranged, relationship, are all struggling with their lives and their roles in a post-feminist world. The eldest son, Martin is a fading former rock n roll star but he is still clinging to his musical dreams. The middle son, Alex, has a successful career and a middle-class lifestyle but his marriage is crumbling. Toby, the youngest and gentlest of the three, wants to have the perfect family and he alone is making an effort to stay connected with his father.

The dementia-stricken Cliff relives his past, first as a young musician who falls in love with the equally talented Margaret but their promising careers and love affair are both cut short by the Second World War. An army officer in Singapore during the Japanese invasion, Cliff is saved from death by a Welsh Sergeant named Sid who sacrifices his own life but then has to endure years of captivity. Returning to Australia, Cliff discovers that Margaret has married another man. He becomes a school-teacher, marries a co-worker and they have three sons. However the marriage is a strained one as Cliff, traumatised by the war, feeling trapped by his obligations as a family man and unhappy at losing Margaret and his chances at a music career, begins to take out his resentment on his family.

Alex's wife leaves him and the stress affects his performance at work. Martin's attempts to restart his music career fail while Toby and his wife struggle to start a family. Through flashbacks, it is revealed that Margaret re-appeared in Cliff's life, offering to restart their relationship but Cliff gives up his last chance of true love by choosing to remain with his sons, a sacrifice they will never know.

Alex quits the firm and goes solo, becoming much happier in the process, relishing the time he gets to spend with his own children. Martin accepts that his youth and his dreams are over and he instead embraces the present and a new relationship, managing to re-connect with his father also. Toby's wife manages to fall pregnant and in his utter joy, he realises he will be a far better parent to his child than his own father ever was.

In the nursing home, Cliff is visited by a vision of Sid. Cliff apologises for not achieving his dreams but Sid points out that he managed to raise three fine boys. Cliff smiles for the first time. Imagining he is back on the sinking wartime ship, Cliff drowns himself in the nursing home's indoor swimming pool.

== Awards ==
- AFI Awards

Best Actress in a Supporting or Guest Role in a Television Drama or Comedy – Essie Davis
Best Telefeature or Mini-Series – Richard Keddie, Andrew Knight, Andrew Wiseman
Best Direction in Television – Brendan Maher
Best Actor in a Supporting or Guest Role in a Television Drama or Comedy – Samuel Johnson (nominated)
Best Actor in a Leading Role in a Television Drama or Comedy – Ray Barrett (nominated)
Best Screenplay in Television – Andrew Knight (nominated)
Open Craft Award – Television – Cezary Skubiszewski For original music (nominated)
Young Actor's Award – Emily Browning (nominated)

- Logie Awards 2004

Most Outstanding Actor in a Drama Series – Ray Barrett
Most Outstanding Actor in a Drama Series – David Wenham

- ARIA Music Awards 2003

Best Original Soundtrack Album – Cezary Skubiszewski (nominated)

- AWGIE Awards 2003

Television – Mini-Series – Original – Andrew Knight

- Australian Cinematographers Society – Golden Tripod 2004

Telefeatures, TV Drama & Mini Series – Geoff Burton
