= Peter Dupas =

Australian serial killer and rapist

- Born: Peter Norris Dupas; July 6, 1953 (age 73); Sydney, New South Wales, Australia
- Penalty: 3 life sentences without the possibility of parole

Details
- Victims: 3–6
- Span of crimes: 1985; 1997 – 1999
- Country: Australia
- State: Victoria
- Date apprehended: 22 April 1999

Peter Norris Dupas (born 6 July 1953) is an Australian convicted serial killer, currently serving three life sentences without parole for murder and primarily for being a serious habitual offender. He has a very significant criminal history involving serious sexual and violent offences, with his violent criminal history spanning more than three decades, and with every release from prison has been known to commit further crimes against women with increasing levels of violence. His criminal signature is to remove the breasts of his female victims.

As of 2007, Dupas has been convicted of three murders and is a prime suspect in at least three other murders committed in the vicinity of the Melbourne area during the 1980s and 1990s.

== Early life ==
Peter Dupas was the youngest of three children, born into what has been described as "a fairly normal family." Born in Sydney, New South Wales, his family moved to Melbourne, Victoria while he was still a toddler. With both siblings considerably older, his parents treated him much like an only child. Dupas left high school upon completing Grade 10 and later obtained his Higher School Certificate.

On 3 October 1968, at the age of 15, Dupas visited his next-door neighbour, requesting to borrow a knife for the purpose of peeling vegetables. Dupas was apprehended after he stabbed the woman in the face, neck, and hand as she attempted to fight off his attack. He later told police he could not help himself and did not know why he began to attack the woman. He was placed on 18 months' probation and admitted to the Larundel Psychiatric Hospital for evaluation; he was released after two weeks and treated as an outpatient.

In October 1969, a mortuary located at the Austin Hospital was broken into. The bodies of two elderly women were mutilated using a pathologist's knife. One body contained a strange wound inflicted with a knife to the area of the thigh. Police believe Dupas was involved in the break-in as the wounds inflicted matched that of a later murder victim, Nicole Patterson.

Senior Detective Ian Armstrong, who interviewed Dupas on 30 November 1973, at the Nunawading Police Station, described Dupas as "weak and compliant" when confronted by authority.

He stood out. To me the guy was just pure evil ... His attacks were all carefully planned and he showed no remorse. We could see where he was going. I remember thinking, 'This guy could go all the way'. He is an unmitigated liar ... he is a very dangerous young person who will continue to offend where females are concerned and will possibly cause the death of one of his victims if he is not straightened out.

— The Age

== Sex offences ==
On 25 July 1974, Dupas was sentenced to nine years' imprisonment with a minimum period of five years for an attack on a woman in her own home. Dupas broke into the victim's house and threatened her with a knife before tying her up with cord and raping her. He threatened to harm her baby when she resisted his attack. The sentencing judge described the offence as "one of the worst rapes that could be imagined". After Dupas was sentenced, prison psychiatrist Dr. Allen Bartholomew noted Dupas was in constant denial of his criminal activity, remarking that: "I am reasonably certain that this youth has a serious psychosexual problem, that he is using the technique of denial as a coping device and that he is to be seen as potentially dangerous. The denial technique makes for huge difficulty in treatment."

In 1979, approximately two months after his release from prison, Dupas again molested women in four separate attacks over a ten-day period. On 28 February 1980, Dupas received a five-year minimum prison sentence for three charges of assault with intent to rape, malicious wounding, assault with intent to rob, and indecent assault. A 1980 report on Dupas stated that: "There is little that can be said in Dupas's favour. He remains an extremely disturbed, immature, and dangerous man. His release on parole was a mistake."

Dupas was again released from prison in February 1985. Approximately one month later, he raped a 21-year-old woman on a beach at Blairgowrie, Victoria. After alighting from his car, Dupas followed the woman and attacked her, holding her to the ground at knifepoint before raping her. He later told police: "I'm sorry for what happened. Everyone was telling me I'm OK now. I never thought it was going to happen again. I only wanted to live a normal life." On 28 June 1985, Dupas was sentenced to 12 years' imprisonment for the Blairgowrie rape and released in 1992 after serving seven years of his sentence.

Less than two years after his release from prison, Dupas was arrested on charges of false imprisonment over an incident at Lake Eppalock in January 1994. Wearing a hood and armed with a knife, insulation tape, and handcuffs, Dupas followed a woman who was picnicking and held her at knifepoint in a toilet block but was chased off by her friends. As he was leaving the scene, he crashed his car and was apprehended. On 18 August 1994, after entering a guilty plea to one count of false imprisonment in the County Court in Bendigo, Dupas was sentenced to three years and nine months' imprisonment, with a minimum period of two years and nine months. In September 1996, Dupas was again released from prison and moved into a house in the Melbourne suburb of Pascoe Vale.

== Murder convictions ==
=== Nicole Patterson ===
Nicole Patterson

Nicole Amanda Patterson was a 28-year-old psychotherapist and youth counsellor employed with the Ardoch Youth Foundation, an organisation formed to assist young drug users. Patterson had desired to operate her own private practice and was using her Northcote home as an office. She placed several classified ads in a local newspaper, the Northcote Leader, in an effort to expand her client base.

Two neighbours reported hearing the screams of a young woman coming from Patterson's house between 9:00 a.m. and 9:30 a.m. on the day of her murder. Attempts by Patterson's boyfriend to contact her in the afternoon failed, raising suspicions.

On 19 April 1999, Patterson's body was discovered by a friend in the front room of her Harper Street, Northcote residence. Patterson's friend had visited to attend a dinner engagement. Upon hearing music from a radio and discovering the front door unlocked, she entered the house and found the body of Patterson severely mutilated.

Patterson died from 27 stab wounds to her chest and back. Her body was discovered naked from the waist down, with her skirt found in a nearby bedroom and her underwear around her ankles. Small pieces of yellow PVC tape were attached to her body and both of her breasts had been removed using a sharp knife. Her handbag and driver's licence were stolen during the attack. The murder weapon and Patterson's breasts have never been recovered.

==== Arrest ====
Police investigations of the crime scene revealed Patterson had a 9am appointment with a new client by the name of "Malcolm" as noted in her personal diary alongside a mobile telephone number. The number was traced to an Indian student studying at La Trobe University named "Harry." Police learned Dupas had approached Harry with an offer of labouring work. On 22 April 1999, police arrested Dupas at midday at the Excelsior Hotel in Thomastown and charged him with the murder of Patterson later the same day.

Telephone records revealed Dupas had made three prior telephone calls to Patterson to arrange a counselling session to treat depression and a gambling addiction, the first from a public telephone booth approximately six weeks before her murder. Over the course of the next six weeks, Dupas made calls to Patterson in an attempt to establish her vulnerability. Dupas later told police he cancelled his appointment with Patterson after being told by her his problem was something he was able to work through of his own accord.

Police also noticed scratches on Dupas's face and hand, consistent with a recent struggle. Dupas claimed the scratches had occurred when he was working in his backyard shed and a piece of wood hit him while using a lathe; Dupas did not own a lathe, however. He later changed his story to the effect that the injuries were sustained while working in the shed and walking by a protruding piece of wood.

A police search of Dupas's home revealed blood-stained clothing, PVC tape similar to that located at the crime scene, a ski mask, newspaper clippings detailing Patterson's murder, and also a paper containing her advertisement for psychotherapy services.

==== Trial and appeal ====
After retiring for less than three hours, the jury returned to deliver a guilty verdict. On 22 August 2000, while sentencing Dupas to life imprisonment without the opportunity for release on parole, Judge Frank Vincent remarked:

"...the prospects of your eventual rehabilitation must be regarded as so close to hopeless that they can be effectively discounted. There is no indication whatsoever that you have experienced any sense of remorse for what you have done, and I doubt that you are capable of any such human response. At a fundamental level, as human beings, you present for us the awful, threatening and unanswerable question: How did you come to be as you are?"

Dupas appeared in the Supreme Court of Victoria Court of Appeal in August 2001 to appeal his conviction for the murder of Patterson. His appeal was dismissed.

=== Margaret Maher ===
Margaret Maher

Margaret Josephine Maher, 40, was a sex worker working in the Melbourne area who was last seen alive at the Safeway supermarket at 12:20 a.m. in Broadmeadows on 4 October 1997.

Her body was discovered under a cardboard box containing computer parts at 1:45 p.m. on 4 October 1997 by a man who made the discovery while he was collecting aluminium with his wife and her sister beside Cliffords Road in Somerton. A black woollen glove was found near Maher's body which police later confirmed contained DNA matching that of Dupas.

A post-mortem examination revealed Maher had suffered a stab wound to her left wrist, bruising to her neck, blunt force trauma with a cinder block to the area of her right eyebrow, and lacerations to her right arm. Maher's left breast had been removed and placed into her mouth. At the time of Maher's murder, Dupas had been out of prison for just over a year after serving time for rape offences and was no longer under the supervision of the government corrections agency, Corrections Victoria.

Dupas was already serving a life sentence without parole for the murder of Patterson at the time of his arrest for the murder of Maher. With Dupas in custody, police were able to obtain a DNA sample, linking him to the 1997 murder of Maher.

==== Trial ====
During a trial lasting three weeks, evidence was presented to the jury that the removal of Patterson's and Maher's breasts were so "strikingly similar" as to be a signature or trademark stamp common to both crimes, thereby identifying Dupas as the killer of both women. The jury, who was not told Dupas was already serving a life term of imprisonment for the murder of Patterson, took less than a day to convict him of his second murder conviction. Upon hearing the jury deliver the guilty verdict, Dupas claimed "it's a kangaroo court" before being led away by court staff to begin his sentence.

After the guilty verdict, Kylie Nicholas, Patterson's sister, described Dupas as "...the most evil predator, a psychopath, a true evil predatory, cunning, repulsive person. It's such a rare evil that comes into this world that's destroyed these women and our lives. We're just praying that this man is held accountable for everything he has done." Ian Joblin, a Melbourne-based forensic psychologist, released a report to the court attempting to explain Dupas's sexual reoffending behaviour:

"Dupas attacked women to fulfil fantasies of conquest and control...For Dupas, the actual assault has not lived up to the fantasy which preceded the assault, and is seen at times as disappointing...He does not feel reassured by either his performance or his victim's response and must find another victim, this time 'the right one'. Thus, his offences become quite repetitive."

On 16 August 2004, Dupas was convicted of the 4 October 1997 murder of Maher and sentenced to a second term of life imprisonment. During sentencing, Kaye remarked he would have sentenced Dupas for a life term for Maher's murder even if he had not killed Patterson and also remarked he would have sentenced Dupas for a life term for his next crime, even if had not have killed anyone, because Dupas was a very serious violent habitual offender with no signs of rehabilitation, saying:

"In view of your appalling criminal history, and in view of the particularly serious nature of the crime for which you have been convicted, it is only appropriate that you be sentenced to life imprisonment. Even if the murder of Nicole Patterson had never occurred, I would have no hesitation in imposing a term of life imprisonment upon you.

"It is clear, both in the present case and from your previous convictions for rape and like offences, that your offending is connected with a need by you to vindicate a perverted and sadistic hatred of women and a contempt for them and their right to live. As such the present offence must be characterised as being in one of the most serious categories of murders which come before this Court.

"You intentionally killed a harmless, defenceless woman who, like all your other victims, had no prospect of protecting herself against you. At the time you committed that offence, you had, over almost three decades, terrorised women in this State. You have repeatedly violated a central norm of a decent civilised society. Your conduct in the present case is without mitigation or palliation. There has been no recognition by you of your wrongdoing. Rather, you repeated the same offence, with even more brutality, 18 months after murdering Margaret Maher.

"Based on your repeated violent offences, and on the gravity of this offence, there is no prospect of your rehabilitation. Nothing was advanced on your behalf to reflect that there is even the faintest glimmer of hope for you. Even if there were, any considerations of rehabilitation must, in this case, be subordinated to the gravity of your offending, the need for the imposition of a just punishment, and the principle of general deterrence. All those circumstances combine, in my view, not only to justify, but also to require that I do not fix a minimum term."

==== Appeal ====
On 25 July 2005 Dupas appeared in the Supreme Court of Victoria Court of Appeal to appeal his conviction for the murder of Maher. His appeal was dismissed.

=== Mersina Halvagis ===
Mersina Halvagis

Mersina Halvagis was a 25-year-old Melbourne woman murdered in an attack on 1 November 1997 while visiting her grandmother's grave in the Greek Orthodox section of Fawkner Cemetery in Fawkner, a northern suburb of Melbourne. The alarm was raised by Halvagis's fiancé when she failed to meet with him later that day as the couple had planned.

Halvagis's body was discovered at 4:35 a.m. on 5 November 1997, by her fiancé in an empty plot, three graves from where her grandmother was buried. Halvagis herself was later buried in the Cheltenham Memorial Park, Melbourne. Police believe Halvagis was attacked from behind while kneeling to attend to a flower arrangement, and that she died from massive injuries, including 87 stab wounds about her knees, neck, with most wounds concentrated around her breasts. Her upper clothing had been pulled over her head towards her chest.

Dupas's home in Coane Street, Pascoe Vale was near the cemetery. Halvagis's murder had remained unsolved since 1997, with the Victorian state government, together with police offering an A$1 million reward for information leading to an arrest. The large reward was the fourth such million dollar reward in Victoria's history.

Frank Cole, an elderly resident of Pascoe Vale, claims he saw Dupas leaving the Fawkner Cemetery on the day of the murder. An anonymous female who was visiting her parents' grave on the day of the murder had also seen Dupas wearing sunglasses casually jogging throughout the cemetery.

==== Inquest ====
An inquest into Halvagis's death before coroner Graeme Johnstone heard circumstantial evidence in the case against Dupas in relation to the murder;

- Nine witnesses identified Dupas as a man they saw at Fawkner Cemetery on the day Halvagis was attacked.
- Dupas's grandfather's gravesite is located 128 metres from the crime scene.
- Dupas frequented the 'First and Last Hotel,' located opposite Fawkner Cemetery.
- Dupas lied to police about a facial injury received about the time of the attack on Halvagis.
- Dupas attempted to alter his appearance after Halvagis's murder.
- Dupas was identified from police photographs by a woman who said she saw him minutes before the attack 20 metres from where Halvagis's murder occurred.

Senior Detective Scarlett told the inquest a car known to be used by Dupas at the time of the murder was sold to a work associate in the month following the murder of Halvagis. The car has since been crushed for scrap metal and was never examined by detectives.

Forensic pathologist Professor David Ransom, who compared wounds suffered by Halvagis to those suffered by Patterson and Maher, told the inquest there was insufficient evidence to suggest the wounds suffered by Halvagis were inflicted using the same knife or by the same person who had murdered Dupas's other victims.

Dupas's lawyer, David Drake, advised the inquest that the only evidence linking Dupas to the murder of Halvagis was that Dupas had lived nearby to the Fawkner Cemetery, and his reputation based on prior convictions for similar offences. He further said police had relied upon their beliefs that Dupas had a propensity to attack women using knives, thereby linking him to the crime.

On 1 August 2006, the inquest was adjourned indefinitely following charges laid by police on Dupas for the murder of Halvagis.

==== Arrest ====
After obtaining a court order granting permission to interview Dupas in relation to Halvagis's murder, police collected Dupas from HM Prison Barwon on 2 September 2006, taking him to the St Kilda Road Police Headquarters in Melbourne for questioning. On 11 September 2006, police charged Dupas with the murder of Halvagis, after disgraced Melbourne lawyer, Andrew Fraser, revealed Dupas confessed to the killing of Halvagis while gardening weeds in Port Phillip Prison during 2002.

Fraser told police he once found a homemade knife concealed among weeds at Port Phillip Prison and he called Dupas over to inspect it, which is when the confession occurred:

"We regularly used to find stuff hidden in the garden, drugs, weapons and other stuff. I once found a homemade knife and called Dupas over to show it to him. He took it off me and started handling it, almost caressing it in a sexual way. Dupas then started saying 'Mersina, Mersina' over and over with this strange look on his face. I was certainly left in no doubt that Dupas murdered Mersina.

"This wasn't some sort of jailhouse confession where somebody has gone in and sat in a cell one night and had a brew with another prisoner and somebody has allegedly said something. It's a lot stronger than that. Dupas and I spoke regularly, just the two of us. This was over months and months that he was talking to me and confiding in me.

"There was one occasion when another prisoner came up to us when we were gardening and started abusing Dupas. This prisoner was yelling at Dupas saying, 'You killed Mersina, you killed Mersina'.

"After he had gone, Dupas turned to me and said 'How does that cunt know I did it?'

After agreeing to give evidence against Dupas, Fraser was released from Fulham Correctional Centre in Sale on 11 September 2006, two months short of his five-year sentence for drug trafficking. The Victorian government stated that Fraser was eligible to apply for a share of the $1 million reward offered for information leading to an arrest on Halvagis's murder.

==== Direct presentment to trial ====
The Victorian Director of Public Prosecutions withdrew the charge of murder in the Melbourne Magistrates' Court and requested the case against Dupas be sent directly to trial, bypassing the committal hearing process. On 26 September 2006, Dupas appeared via video link in the Supreme Court of Victoria, charged with Halvagis's murder, entering a plea of not guilty. Drake, Dupas's barrister, told the Supreme Court his client was being unfairly dealt with by skipping the usual process of a committal hearing in the Magistrates' Court. The Supreme Court of Victoria ruled on whether Dupas would face a committal hearing in November 2006. On 14 November 2006, Dupas appeared in the Supreme Court of Victoria before Justice John Coldrey, where he requested an opportunity to be able to cross-examine witness Andrew Fraser before a criminal trial takes place.

On 12 December 2006, the Supreme Court of Victoria ordered Dupas be presented directly to trial for the murder of Halvagis, bypassing the usual committal hearing process.

==== Trial ====
The trial for the murder of Halvagis ran for 22 days. On 9 July 2007, the jury selected for the trial was discharged on a "legal technicality" when prosecutor Colin Hillman SC advised Justice Philip Cummins that a failure to comply with the Jury Act had occurred when potential jurors were not advised of the possible duration of the trial.

Prosecution witness and disgraced lawyer Andrew Fraser described to the jury how Dupas attacked Halvagis. Fraser has now submitted a claim to the $1 million reward.

Dupas was found guilty of the murder of Halvagis on 9 August 2007 and appeared for a pre-sentencing hearing eight days later. Dupas was sentenced to his third life sentence with no minimum term. The sentencing judge allowed permission for one television camera to record the sentencing of Dupas, the only televised sentencing in Australia since the 1995 sentencing of child killer Nathan John Avent. Upon sentencing Dupas, the judge said "life means life".

On 10 September 2007, lawyers for Dupas submitted an appeal on the basis that the verdict of guilty for the murder of Halvagis was unsafe and unsatisfactory.

On 17 September 2009, Dupas's appeal against the conviction was upheld in Victoria's Court of Appeal by a two-to-one majority. The Court ruled that the directions of the judge in the original trial were inadequate. On 14 October 2009, lawyers for Dupas argued that the proceedings against him should be stayed permanently based on the publicity surrounding the case. Victorian Supreme Court Justice Paul Coghlan disagreed and set the trial date for 7 April 2010. On 26 October 2010, a new trial for the murder of Halvagis commenced in the Victorian Supreme Court. On 19 November 2010, Dupas was again convicted of the murder of Halvagis after three-and-a-half days of deliberations by the jury. On 26 November 2010, Dupas was sentenced to life in prison without the possibility of parole.

Due to a court injunction in 2019, Channel Seven was prevented from screening the episode of Beyond the Darklands featuring Dupas.

== Other suspected murders ==
=== Helen McMahon ===
McMahon was a 47-year-old woman found beaten to death on a Rye beach on 13 February 1985. She was sunbathing topless on the beach when she was attacked. Her body was discovered naked and covered by her beach towel. The location of the murder was near the location where Dupas had earlier raped a 21-year-old woman at a beach in Blairgowrie, for which he was convicted and served a term of imprisonment. It was originally thought Dupas was in prison at the time of McMahon's murder and was not released until two weeks later; however, investigators learned that Dupas was on pre-release leave from prison and living in the Rye area when McMahon was killed. Police believe McMahon may have been Dupas's first murder victim although her murder officially remains unsolved.

=== Renita Brunton ===
Dupas is a suspect in the murder of 31-year-old Brunton in the kitchen of her second-hand clothing store at a mall in Sunbury, Victoria on 5 November 1993. Investigators found that Brunton had been stabbed 106 times.

=== Kathleen Downes ===
Dupas is a suspect in the murder of 95-year-old Downes at the Brunswick Lodge nursing home in Brunswick. Downes was stabbed to death at 6:30 a.m. on 31 December 1997, one month after Halvagis's murder. Police investigations revealed Dupas had telephoned the nursing home some time before the murder. Dupas was charged with Downes's murder in February 2018.

== Marriage ==
While imprisoned at Melbourne's Pentridge Prison, Dupas formed a relationship with mental health nurse Grace McConnell, who was 16 years his senior. The pair married in 1987 inside Castlemaine Gaol.

McConnell described her marriage to Dupas during the inquest into the murder of Halvagis:

"He insisted that he was in love with me .... and that with my help he could come out of himself and become a normal person. I agreed (to marry Dupas), not out of particular love for this man but from a sense of responsibility to helping him become a useful member of the community. In my mind, our relationship was mother and son. "Our sex life was very basic, almost non-existent. I would go along with it out of a sense of responsibility ... It got to the stage where I could not bear him touching me.

His new wife found him to be self-obsessed, lazy, needy, and a snob, and they divorced during the mid-1990s.

== Prison life ==
As of 2006, Dupas was serving his sentences between the maximum-security protection unit of Port Phillip Correctional Centre, at Laverton and HM Prison Barwon in Lara, a northern suburb of Geelong. He has attempted suicide several times while imprisoned. Prison staff describe him as a model prisoner while in custody and "a monster" whenever released.

== Summary of criminal convictions ==
Before his first conviction for murder, Dupas had 16 prior convictions involving acts of sexual violence from six court appearances between 27 March 1972 and 11 November 1994.

Date	Conviction	Comments
25 July 1974	Rape	Sentenced to 9 years of imprisonment.
28 February 1980	Rape	Committed two months after his release from prison. Sentenced to 5 years of imprisonment.
28 June 1985	Rape	Committed 4 days after his release from prison. Sentenced to 12 years of imprisonment.
18 August 1994	False imprisonment	Sentenced to 3 years of imprisonment.
22 August 2000	Murder	Nicole Patterson. Sentenced to life imprisonment with no minimum period.
16 August 2004	Murder	Margaret Maher. Sentenced to life imprisonment with no minimum period.
9 August 2007	Murder	Mersina Halvagis. Sentenced to life imprisonment with no minimum period on 27 August 2007. Conviction set aside after successful appeal by Dupas.
19 November 2010	Murder	Mersina Halvagis (retrial). Sentenced to life imprisonment with no minimum period on 26 November 2010.

== Chronology ==
- 6 July 1953 Peter Norris Dupas born.
- 3 October 1968 at age fifteen he stabbed his female neighbour and received eighteen months' probation.
- 25 July 1974 sentenced to 5 to 9 years' imprisonment for rape aged 21.
- 1979 approximately two months after his release from prison, Dupas again molested women in four separate attacks over a ten-day period.
- 28 February 1980 Dupas received a five-year minimum prison sentence for three charges of assault with intent to rape, malicious wounding, assault with intent to rob, and indecent assault.
- 1985 February released from prison.
- 28 June 1985 Dupas was sentenced to twelve years' imprisonment for rape that was committed four days after his release from prison
- Less than two years after his release from prison, Dupas was arrested on charges of false imprisonment over an incident at Lake Eppalock in January 1994.
- 18 August 1994 after entering a guilty plea to one count of false imprisonment, Dupas was sentenced to three years and nine months' imprisonment, with a minimum period of two years and nine months.
- September 1996 Dupas released from prison.
- 4 October 1997 The murdered body of Maher was discovered.
- 1 November 1997 Halvagis murdered. Body discovered the next day.
- 31 December 1997 Downes murdered. Dupas charged with murder in February 2018
- 19 April 1999 The body of Patterson was discovered.
- 22 April 1999 Police arrested Dupas.
- 22 August 2000 Sentenced to life imprisonment for the murder of Patterson with no minimum period.
- 16 August 2004 Dupas was convicted of the murder of Maher and sentenced to a second term of life imprisonment.
- 11 September 2006 Police charged Dupas with the murder of Halvagis.
- 9 August 2007 Dupas was convicted of the murder of Halvagis.
- 27 August 2007 Dupas sentenced to serve life imprisonment for the murder of Halvagis.
- 17 September 2009 Dupas's appeal upheld against conviction for the murder of Halvagis, verdict set aside.
- 25 October 2010 second trial for the murder of Halvagis begins.
- 19 November 2010 Dupas is convicted for a second time of the Halvagis murder.
- 26 November 2010 sentenced to life imprisonment for the murder of Halvagis, with no minimum term. This means that Dupas will not be eligible for parole, due to no minimum term being fixed, and will spend the rest of his life in prison.

== See also ==
- List of serial killers by country
