= Nigel Latta Blows Stuff Up =

New Zealand science television series

Nigel Latta Blows Stuff Up is a New Zealand science television series that started on 19 April 2015, hosted by Nigel Latta.

== Watch options ==
- Curiosity Stream
- Apple TV
- TVNZ+
