= Beyond the Darklands (New Zealand TV series) =

- Genre: True crime
- Presented by: Nigel Latta
- Narrated by: Harry Lyon
- Country of origin: New Zealand
- Original language: English
- No. of series: 5
- No. of episodes: 32

Production
- Running time: approx. 50 min.
- Production company: Screentime

Original release
- Network: TV One
- Release: 30 January 2008 – 29 October 2012

Beyond the Darklands is a New Zealand true crime television series that aired on TVNZ's TV One. It is narrated and presented by clinical psychologist Nigel Latta, with each episode focusing on a certain criminal (usually a murderer or team of murderers). The show ran for five seasons. Inspiration for the series came from Latta's 2003 book Into the Darklands: Unveiling the Predators Among Us, which dealt with Latta's work as a forensic psychologist.

An Australian series of the same name, based on the New Zealand show, was produced in 2009.

== Episodes ==
=== Series 1 ===
No.	Title	Original release date	NZ viewers (thousands)
1.1	"William Bell"	30 January 2008	N/A
Bell was convicted of the murders of three people while on parole in 2001.
1.2	"Jules Mikus"	6 February 2009	N/A
In 1987, Mikus raped and murdered six-year-old Teresa Cormack in Napier. This episode examines Mikus's own traumatic background at the hands of his father, who was also convicted of rape and accused of sex offences against young girls.
1.3	"Paul Bailey"	13 February 2009	N/A
This episode deals with Paul Bailey, a multiple sex offender who abducted, raped, and murdered 15-year-old Kylie Smith in Owaka, South Otago in 1991.
1.4	"Terry Clark"	20 February 2009	N/A
Notorious international drugs smuggler, Clark (a.k.a. "Mr Asia") was convicted in 1981 of murdering his former business partner, Martyn Johnstone.
1.5	"Taffy Hotene"	27 February 2009	398.5
A repeat sexual offender, Hotene was jailed for the rape and murder of journalist Kylie Jones while on parole in 2001.
1.6	"Bruce Howse"	5 March 2010	309.5

=== Series 2 ===
No.	Title	Original release date	NZ viewers (thousands)
2.1	"Steven Williams"	18 February 2009	N/A
2.2	"Bernard McGrath"	25 February 2009	N/A
2.3	"Ese Faleali'i"	4 March 2009	N/A
2.4	"Michael Curran"	11 March 2009	N/A
2.5	"Blue Poumako"	18 March 2009	N/A
2.6	"Graeme Burton"	26 January 2010	N/A
The transmission of this episode was delayed by nearly a year after convicted murderer Burton successfully sought a court injunction to delay broadcast until after a separate court case he was involved with.

=== Series 3 ===
No.	Title	Original release date	NZ viewers (thousands)
3.1	"Antonie Dixon"	2 February 2010	N/A
3.2	"Tracy Goodman"	8 February 2010	N/A
3.3	"Daniel Moore"	16 February 2010	N/A
3.4	"Mark Lundy"	24 February 2010	N/A
3.5	"Bert Potter"	2 March 2010	398.5
3.6	"Travis Burns"	9 March 2010	309.5

=== Series 4 ===
No.	Title	Original release date	NZ viewers (thousands)
4.1	"Paul Joseph Dally"	13 April 2011	N/A
4.2	"Gavin Hawthorne"	20 April 2011	N/A
4.3	"George Baker"	27 April 2011	N/A
4.4	"Joseph Reekers"	4 May 2011	N/A
4.5	"Shannon Flewellen"	11 May 2011	N/A
4.6	"Liam Reid"	3 September 2012	N/A

=== Series 5 ===
No.	Title	Original release date	NZ viewers (thousands)
5.1	"Jason Somerville"	22 October 2012	582.1
5.2	"Brad Callaghan"	10 September 2012	N/A
5.3	"Dean Wickliffe"	17 September 2012	N/A
5.4	"Cyndi Fairburn"	24 September 2012	N/A
Latta examines the "body on the bonnet" case, focussing largely on the psychological background of Fairburn.
5.5	"The Mark brothers"	1 October 2012	575.5
Latta looks at two brothers, Tui Mark and Ron Mark, whose lives turned out very differently: one turned to a life of crime and the other became a politician tough on law and order.
5.6	"Nia Glassie"	8 October 2012	560.4
Latta examines a case involving the death by abuse of three-year-old Nia Glassie. This episode has been described as "quite likely the most horrifying but also the most important piece of television a New Zealander could ever see."
5.7	"Peter Holdem"	15 October 2012	564.6
5.8	"Victims"	29 October 2012	572.2
Latta looks at how three people coped with losing a loved one through a violent crime: Dawn Smith, whose 15-year-old daughter Kylie Smith was abducted, raped and murdered by Paul Bailey while riding her horse in Owaka on 1 November 1991 (see Episode 1.3) Rita Croskery, whose son Michael Choy, a pizza delivery driver, died after a group of teenagers beat him with a baseball bat in Papakura on 12 September 2001 Senior Constable Bruce Lamb, a Christchurch police dog handler who was injured — and his dog Gage killed — when Christopher Graham Smith fired upon them while they were executing a drugs search warrant on 13 July 2010
