= Leah Giarratano =

Australian clinical psychologist and author

Dr Leah Giarratano
- Born: Leah Giarratano
- Education: University of Wollongong
- Occupations: writer and psychologist
- Writing career
- Language: English
- Period: 2005
- Genres: crime and young adult fantasy
- Notable works: Vodka Doesn't Freeze, Black Ice

Leah Giarratano is a clinical psychologist and author who specialises in a number of areas including psychopathology and trauma counselling. She is an expert in psychological trauma and sex offences, treating both perpetrators and victims.

== Writing ==
Giarratano has written numerous books related to clinical skills for treating psychological trauma.

She has also written a number of novels with themes which are related to her work experiences. Her first three novels centered on her character Jill Jackson. In 2012, she published her first young adult fantasy novel Disharmony: The Telling. This was followed in 2013 by The Laeduin and Immortal Combat to complete the trilogy.

She was also the host of "Beyond The Darklands" a 2009 television series that examined the crimes and motives of serious offenders in Australia.

== Bibliography ==
Clinical texts:

- Clinical Skills for Treating Traumatised Adolescents: Evidence Based Treatment for PTSD (2004)
- Clinical Skills for Managing PTSD: Proven Practical Techniques for Treating Posttraumatic Stress Disorder (2004)
- CBT for GPs: GP and Patient Resources (2004)
- Managing Psychological Trauma: Clinician and Client Resources for the Clinical Skills Series (2004)
- Clinical Skills for Managing Acute Psychological Trauma: Effective Early Intervention for Treating Acute Stress Disorder (2004)
- Cognitive Behavioural Therapy Strategies for Use in General Practice: Effective Psychological Strategies for Medical Practitioners (2004)
- Clinical Skills for Managing Complex Traumatisation (2018)

Novels:

- Vodka Doesn't Freeze (2007)
- Voodoo Doll (2008)
- Black Ice (2009)
- Watch the World Burn (2010)
- Disharmony trilogy:
  - The Telling (2012)
  - The Laeduin (2013)
  - Immortal Combat (2013)

== Awards ==
- 2010 - Black Ice shortlisted for the Davitt Award — Best Adult Crime Novel
