= Nigel Latta =

New Zealand psychologist and broadcaster (1967–2025)

Nigel Latta ONZM
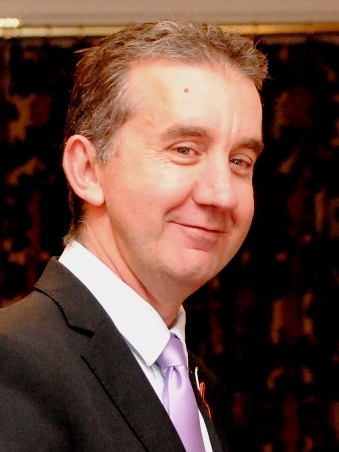
- Latta in 2012
- Born: Nigel Raymond Latta; 3 July 1967; Oamaru, New Zealand
- Died: 30 September 2025 (aged 58); Auckland, New Zealand
- Occupations: Clinical psychologist; author; broadcaster
- Spouse: Natalie Flynn (married 2023)

Nigel Raymond Latta ONZM (3 July 1967 – 30 September 2025) was a New Zealand clinical psychologist, author and broadcaster. He had often been described as "New Zealand's best-known psychologist".

== Early life ==
Nigel Raymond Latta was born and raised in Oamaru, New Zealand. His father was a builder and his mother was a housewife. He attended Waitaki Boys' High School, and briefly considered becoming a police officer. When he was young he toured the South Island as part of a skiffle band.

Latta studied marine science and zoology at the University of Otago, and completed a Master of Philosophy with First Class Honours in psychology at the University of Auckland, along with a postgraduate diploma in clinical psychology.

== Career ==
The first book that Latta wrote was a novel called Execution Lullaby. Although the novel was well-received, his publisher believed that Latta would be more successful if he wrote non-fiction books. In 2003, he wrote Into the Darklands: Unveiling the Predators Among Us, a book that examined the psychology of criminals. The book inspired the TVNZ series Beyond the Darklands. He also wrote books about parenting advice and gave advice during the parenting segment of Radio New Zealand's This Way Up.

Latta worked as a consultant in his field for private companies and government social service agencies, including Department of Corrections, the New Zealand Police and Child Youth and Family.

In the 2010s, he became known for his true crime documentaries and psychology-based television series, as the host of Beyond the Darklands, The Politically Incorrect Guide to Teenagers, The Politically Incorrect Parenting Show, and a science show called Nigel Latta Blows Stuff Up, among others. In 2016, Latta co-founded Ruckus Films, a production company which produced several feature documentaries including Born This Way: Awa's Story and Stan. He also began presenting general interest television shows, such as The Hard Stuff with Nigel Latta, which approached social and political issues, and You've Been Scammed by Nigel Latta which examines common types of scams.

== Personal life ==
Latta had two children from his first marriage. In 2023 he married Natalie Flynn, a fellow psychologist, and was step parent to her three children.

=== Illness and death ===
In September 2024, Latta revealed that he had been diagnosed with "inoperable and incurable" terminal stomach cancer, and that he was undergoing chemotherapy that had shrunk the tumour by about 60 percent. Latta was told that he had 6 to 12 months to live. In February 2025, the prognosis was reduced to four weeks after a scan indicated that the cancer had spread to his lungs. However, Latta later said that, because of the treatment he was receiving, he believed he would continue to live for "years and years". In March 2025, he stated that he was no longer terminally ill.

Latta died at a hospice in the Auckland suburb of Ponsonby on 30 September 2025, at the age of 58.

== Honours ==
Latta was appointed an Officer of the New Zealand Order of Merit in the 2012 Queen's Birthday and Diamond Jubilee Honours, for services to psychology.

== Filmography ==
Year	Title	Role
2008–2012	Beyond the Darklands	Presenter
2009	The Politically Incorrect Parenting Show	Presenter
2011	The Politically Incorrect Guide to Teenagers	Presenter
2011	After the Quake: Helping Children Cope	Presenter
2012	The Politically Incorrect Guide to Grown Ups	Presenter
2014	Nigel Latta	Presenter
2015	Nigel Blows Stuff Up	Presenter
2015	On Thin Ice: Nigel Latta in Antarctica	Presenter
2016–2018	The Hard Stuff with Nigel Latta	Presenter
2017–2018	Mind over Money with Nigel Latta	Presenter
2017–2019	What Next? with Nigel Latta and John Campbell	Presenter
2018	The Curious Mind	Presenter
2020	Kids: An Instruction Manual with Nigel Latta	Presenter
2023	You've Been Scammed by Nigel Latta	Presenter

== Publications ==
- Latta, Nigel (2000). Execution Lullaby. Auckland, New Zealand: HarperCollins. ISBN 978-1-86950-364-2. OCLC 155477851. Novel.
- —— (2007). Into the Darklands and Beyond: Unveiling the Predators Among Us (Updated ed.). Auckland, New Zealand: HarperCollins. ISBN 978-1-86950-669-8. OCLC 174095614.
- —— (2010). Politically Incorrect Parenting: Before Your Kids Drive You Crazy. Auckland, New Zealand: HarperCollins. ISBN 978-1-86950-865-4. OCLC 805509224.
- —— (2010). The Politically Incorrect Guide to Teenagers: Before Your Teenagers Drive You Crazy. Auckland, New Zealand: HarperCollins. ISBN 978-1-86950-908-8. OCLC 703723537.
- —— (2009). Mothers Raising Sons: What Every Mother Needs to Know to Save Her Sanity!. Auckland, New Zealand: HarperCollins. ISBN 978-1-86950-784-8. OCLC 703723537.
- —— (2010). Fathers Raising Daughters: The Father's Guide to the Female Mind-Field. Auckland, New Zealand: HarperCollins. ISBN 978-1-86950-787-9. OCLC 703723537.
- —— (2012). Battlefield Wisdom: Top Tips for Busy Parents. Auckland, New Zealand: HarperCollins. ISBN 978-1-86950-967-5. OCLC 703723537.
- —— (2013). The Modern Family Survival Guide. Auckland, New Zealand: Random House. ISBN 978-1-77553-291-0. OCLC 847204196.
