= Jolene Anderson =

Australian actress and singer (born 1980)

- Born: Kempsey, New South Wales, Australia
- Occupations: Actress, singer
- Years active: 2004–present
- Children: 1

Jolene Anderson is an Australian actress and singer.

From 2006 to 2008, she played the character of Erica Templeton on the drama series All Saints. She is also the winner of the second series of celebrity singing competition It Takes Two. She also appears as Detective Inspector Liz Darby, daughter of one of the title characters in the Australian series Darby and Joan (2022-25), which stars Bryan Brown as retired cop Jack Darby and Greta Scacchi as Joan Kirkhope.

== Career ==
=== Television ===
Anderson played Erica Templeton on All Saints until 30 September 2008, when her character was pronounced dead, as she had been missing for more than 3 weeks. She was one of the younger cast members and reputedly popular with the audience.

In the first episode of the 2007 season of It Takes Two, Anderson and her partner David Campbell performed "The Sweet Escape" by Gwen Stefani and scored eights from all four judges giving them a score of 32 and therefore being at the top of the leaderboard for the first episode of the series. She continued to score highly amongst the judges and was one of the favourites for the entire competition. On 19 June 2007, she became the first contestant in the show to score a perfect ten from all four judges on both performances. Anderson and Campbell went on to win It Takes Two on 10 July 2007.

Anderson later accepted the role of "Our Girl" in the Andrew Lloyd Webber song cycle Tell Me on a Sunday. The production had mixed reviews, but Jolene's performance was generally well received, in her musical theatre debut.

Anderson hosted Bush Doctors in 2008, introducing and doing voice-overs during the show. The series aired from January to March 2008.

Anderson signed on to become a series regular in the Ten Network cop drama series Rush. Her character, Shannon Henry, made her debut in the series' second season which premiered on 16 July 2009.

In 2019 Anderson joined the cast of Harrow playing Dr. Grace Molyneux, a junior medical examiner with a mysterious past and Harrow's love interest for Season 2, Anderson was also a part of Season 3 filming and revealed during an interview with TV Week she had just returned to work after giving birth to her daughter only 3 weeks beforehand.

In 2022, she began appearing in Darby and Joan as a police detective in the Queensland, Australia-set mystery-comedy. The series is streamed on Acorn TV.

=== Theatre ===
From 14 November 2011 to 10 December 2011, Anderson was cast as the leading role of Hypatia, in Queensland Theatre Company's Fractions, by Marcel Dorney. Hypatia is a brilliant female mathematician and philosopher who, 1600 years ago, was responsible for the Library of Alexandria - a collection of all the knowledge in her world. When political turmoil runs unchecked, religious fanatics threaten to destroy the Library. As Hypatia struggles to save it, she is forced to confront her own prejudice, and to make a terrible choice.

== Filmography ==
=== Film ===
Year	Title	Role	Notes
2004	Adieu	Gloria	Short film
2011	Game	Olivia	Short film
2013	Beyond Memories	Sophie	Short film
2017	Searchers	Eden Brooks	Television film
2017	Prodigy	Olivia	Television film
2018	Living Space	Officer's wife	Feature film
2018	515	Indy	Short film
2018	Book Week	Officer Hurley	Short film
2019	Short Sleeves	Mrs. McIntyre	Short film
2019	Prey	Mother	Feature film
2019	The Dustwalker	Joanne Sharp	Feature film
2020	Captive	Ivy	Feature film

=== Television ===
Year	Title	Role	Notes	Ref
2006–2008	All Saints	Erica Templeton	106 episodes	
2008	Bush Doctors	Host		
2009–2012	Play School	Host		
2009–2011	Rush	Sergeant Shannon Henry	57 episodes	
2012	Dance Academy	April	2 episodes	
2014–2015	Home and Away	Neive Devlin	15 episodes	
2019–2021	Harrow	Dr. Grace Molyneux	20 episodes	
2021	The Other Side of the Nebula	Hagan	Episode: "Night Swift"	
2022-present	Darby and Joan	Detective Inspector Liz Darby	11 episodes	

== Awards ==
Anderson has been nominated for a Logie Award in 2007 for Most Popular New Female Talent for her role as Erica Templeton in All Saints but lost out to Amy Mathews from Home and Away.
