= Rush (2008 TV series) =

- Genre: Police procedural
- Created by: John Edwards; Christopher Lee
- Starring: Rodger Corser; Callan Mulvey; Claire van der Boom; Josef Ber; Nicole da Silva; Ashley Zukerman; Jolene Anderson; Kevin Hofbauer; Antony Starr; Samuel Johnson; Catherine McClements
- Composer: Stephen Rae
- Country of origin: Australia
- Original language: English
- No. of seasons: 4
- No. of episodes: 70 (list of episodes)

Production
- Production locations: Melbourne, Victoria, Australia
- Editor: Rodrigo Balart
- Running time: 45 minutes
- Production company: Southern Star Entertainment

Original release
- Network: Network Ten
- Release: 2 September 2008 – 17 November 2011

Rush is an Australian television police drama that first aired on Network Ten on 2 September 2008. Set in Melbourne, Victoria, it focuses on the members of a Police Tactical Response team. It is produced by John Edwards and Mimi Butler for Endemol Australia, which was branded as the Southern Star Group during production of the series.

In late October 2011, text phrasing on the cover art of Entertainment One's DVD release of the fourth series first indicated Rush would not return for another series, meaning series 4 would be its last. Soon after, the production company, known at the time as the Southern Star Group confirmed with TV Tonight that a fifth series had not been commissioned. Network Ten did not issue any press releases stating the wrapping up of Rush. Executive Producer of Drama and Production at Network Ten, Rick Maier, issued a statement on the show's official Facebook page: "While we don't discount a return series, it is not on the cards at this stage – but we do intend to finish season four with a bang, literally."

== Plot ==
Rush follows the lives of members of the prestigious Tactical Response team (TR), which is based on the real life Victoria Police Critical Incident Response Team, a highly mobile unit that fills the operational gap between general duties police and the SWAT-like Special Operations Group. The team is seen responding to violent incidents such as carjackings, suicides and armed offences.

Most of the episodes involve at least one main plot, with one or two smaller subplots throughout each episode. In some cases, they will focus on one plot, while the personal lives tend to fall into the form of smaller subplots that span over a number of episodes. Usually the team is divided into two, one team per case, with the team taking the minor subplot meeting up with the major team at some stage throughout the episode. The usual six-person team is split between two vehicles known as TR01 and TR02.

In series four, the composition of the plot was revamped with only one large and extensive arc featured throughout the 13 episodes, as opposed to the story-line structure of prior series.

== Production ==
The pilot for Rush, originally titled Rapid Response, was filmed in 2004 and based on an earlier Police Rescue script. The pilot featured several characters and cast who did not return for the series, including Matthew Le Nevez, Libby Tanner and Corinne Grant. The series was initially rejected but years later was picked up for production when the 2007–2008 Writers Guild of America strike affected Ten's imported shows.

Sergeant Dominic "Dom" Wales, played by Josef Ber, was originally scripted to be killed in the first season, however during production Van der Boom asked to be released. Her US working visa had been approved and being a "Residency Visa", required her to move to the US. As such, the character of Grace was killed off instead. Jolene Anderson joined the cast for the second series, from 16 July 2009. The series is filmed in Victoria in both regional and metropolitan areas.

A third season of Rush was announced by Channel Ten on 25 September 2009. It premiered in the time-slot of 8:30pm on 22 July 2010.

A thirteen-episode fourth season was confirmed by Channel Ten's Executive Producer of Drama and Production, Rick Maier on 12 November 2010. He stated "Rush continues to deliver great stories, great stunts and some of the best performances on TV". Filming for the fourth season began on 6 May 2011.

== Cast ==
First series characters (from left to right): Leon Broznic, Dominic Wales, Grace Barry, Brendan Joshua, Lawson Blake, Stella Dagostino, Michael Sandrelli and Kerry Vincent

=== Main cast ===
Actor/actress	Character	Rank	Past rank/s	Tenure	Episodes
Rodger Corser	Lawson Blake	Senior Sergeant		2008–2011	01–70
Callan Mulvey	Brendan 'Josh' Joshua	Sergeant		2008–2011	01–70
Claire van der Boom	Grace Barry	Senior Constable		2008	01–11
Josef Ber	Dominic 'Dom' Wales	Sergeant		2008–2010	01–51
Nicole da Silva	Stella Dagostino	Senior Constable	Constable	2008–2011	01–70
Ashley Zukerman	Michael Sandrelli	Senior Constable	Constable	2008–2011	01-65
Samuel Johnson	Leon Broznic	Intelligence Officer		2008–2011	01-70
Catherine McClements	Kerry Vincent	Superintendent	Inspector	2008–2011	01-70
Jolene Anderson	Shannon Henry	Sergeant	Senior Constable	2009–2011	14–70
Luke Arnold	Elliot Ryan	Constable		2009	34–35
Kevin Hofbauer	Christian Tapu	Constable		2010–2011	36–70
Antony Starr	Charlie Lewis	Senior Sergeant		2011	58–70

=== Recurring ===
- Asher Keddie as Jacinta Burns; journalist and love interest of Lawson Blake (Season 2, 7 episodes)
- Camille Keenan as Audrey Khoo; police intelligence officer (Season 3, 15 episodes)
- Elena Mandalis as Anna Vargis; police minister (Season 4, 8 episodes)
- Ella-Rose Shenman as Minka Button; daughter of Tash Button (Seasons 3–4, 6 episodes)
- Emily Wheaton as Amber Cushing; niece and assistant of Leon Broznic (Seasons 4, 9 episodes)
- Ian Meadows as James Vincent; drug addict and son of Kerry Vincent (Seasons 3–4, 5 episodes)
- Jane Allsop as Tash Button; love interest of Brendan Joshua (Seasons 3–4, 12 episodes)
- Justin Rosniak as Tompkinson 'Tommo' (Seasons 3 & 4, 2 episodes)
- Kate Jenkinson as Nina Wise; love interest of Leon Broznic (Seasons 1–2, 4 episodes)
- Maia Thomas as Sandrine Wales; wife of Dominic Wales (Seasons 1–2, 4 episodes)
- Malcolm Kennard as Col Rainey; son of Doug Rainey (Season 4, 3 episodes)
- Mark Leonard Winter as Liam Rainey; son of Doug Rainey and brother of Col Rainey (Season 4, 3 episodes)
- Nathaniel Dean as Andrew Kronin; career criminal and nemesis of Lawson Blake (Seasons 2–3, 5 episodes)
- Nikki Shiels as Cleo Temple; journalist and love interest of Stella Dagostino (Season 4, 3 episodes)
- Paul Ireland as Boyd Kemper; brother of hit-and-run victim and love interest of Kerry Vincent (Season 2, 5 episodes)
- Peter Hardy as Doug Rainey; head of a notorious crime family (Season 4, 4 episodes)
- Rohan Nichol as Napthorn (Season 2, 3 episodes)
- Todd MacDonald as Connor Barry; husband of Grace Barry (Season 1, 6 episodes)
- Zed Ledden as Brian Marshall (Seasons 1–2, 3 episodes)

=== Guests ===
- Alicia Banit as Gemma Rose Parker (Season 1, 1 episode)
- Andrew Blackman as Geoffrey (Season 1, 1 episode)
- Anthony Hayes as Oliver Ginsberg (Season 3, 2 episodes)
- Blair Venn as Paul Duffy (1 episode)
- Brett Swain as Mr Osbourne (Season 4, 1 episode)
- Cameron Nugent as Tony Ellis (1 episode)
- Charlotte Gregg as Shay (Season 2, episode 12)
- Damien Fotiou as Zonneveldt (Season 3, 2 episodes)
- Daniela Farinacci as Rita (Season 1, 1 episode)
- Eliza Taylor as Madison Taylor Hume (Season 1, 1 episode)
- Elspeth Ballantyne as Edie (1 episode)
- Georgia Chara as Student (Season 2, 1 episode)
- Ian Bliss as Ollie Godard (1 episode)
- Jacek Koman as Anton (1 episode)
- Jack Finsterer as Michael Schmitt (Season 3, 1 episode)
- Jansen Spencer as Dimitrius / Gunman (Season 3, 2 episodes)
- John Brumpton as Charlie Thomas (1 episode)
- Kate Keltie as Abbie (Season 1, 1 episode)
- Lachy Hulme as Jacob White (Season 2, 1 episode)
- Lani Tupu as Pell Fisher (1 episode)
- Libby Tanner as Robyn Hume (Season 1, 1 episode)
- Lisa Aldenhoven as Jennifer (Season 2, 1 episode)
- Louise Crawford as Susie (Season 3, 1 episode)
- Louise Siversen as Raelene (Season 1, 1 episode)
- Marta Kaczmarek as Helen (Season 2, 1 episode)
- Martin Copping as Constable Young (Season 1, 2 episodes)
- Marty Fields as Ned Meribel (1 episode)
- Maude Davey as Donna (Season 3, 1 episode)
- Nell Feeney as Denise (Season 1, 1 episode)
- Nicholas Bell as Brett Cohen (Season 4, 2 episodes)
- Nick Carrafa as Carlo Lavilla (1 episode)
- Osamah Sami as Hazrat (1 episode)
- Paul Denny as Paul (1 episode)
- Peta Brady as Linda (Season 3, 1 episode)
- Richard Davies as Jerrod (Season 2, 1 episode)
- Simon Lyndon as Snuffy Wells (Season 1, 1 episode)
- Steve Mouzakis as Kreiser (Season 3, 1 episode)
- Tim Ross as Williams Caruthers (2 episodes)
- Tony Nikolakopoulos as Edward (Season 3, 1 episode)
- Salme Geransar (Season 3, 1 episode)

== Episodes ==
Series	Episodes	Originally released	
Series	Episodes	First released	Last released
1	13	2 September 2008	25 November 2008
2	22	16 July 2009	26 November 2009
3	22	22 July 2010	16 December 2010
4	13	1 September 2011	17 November 2011

== Home media ==
=== Home media ===
Title	Format	Date released	# of episodes	# of discs	Special features	Distributors
Season 01	DVD	30 July 2009	13	4	Behind the scenes	Hopscotch Entertainment
Season 02: Volume One	DVD	3 December 2009	12	3	None	Hopscotch Entertainment
Season 02: Volume Two	DVD	1 April 2010	10	3	None	Hopscotch Entertainment
Season 03: Volume One	DVD	2 December 2010	12	3	None	Hopscotch Entertainment
Season 03: Volume Two	DVD	3 March 2011	10	3	None	Hopscotch Entertainment
Season 04	DVD	15 December 2011	13	3	None	Hopscotch Entertainment
The Complete Series 1–4	DVD	5 December 2012	70	19	Behind the scenes (Series 1 only)	Hopscotch Entertainment
The Complete Collection	DVD	4 August 2021	70	19	Behind the scenes (Series 1 only)	Via Vision Entertainment

=== Online Streaming ===
Original Broadcast on Tenplay (2008-2012)

Re-Release Broadcast On Tenplay (2019–Present)

Title	Format	Episodes #	Release date	Streaming Status	Web Extras	Distributors
Rush: The Complete Season 01	Streaming	13	September - November 2008 6 September 2019 (Re-Release)	Expired 2012 Current	Behind The Scenes (Webisodes) Rush Premiere Party (Ten News Video) Photo Gallery	Tenplay
Rush: The Complete Season 02	Streaming	22	July - November 2009 6 September 2019 (Re-Release)	Expired 2012 Current	Behind The Scenes (Webisodes) Photo Gallery	Tenplay
Rush: The Complete Season 03	Streaming	22	July - December 2010 6 September 2019 (Re-Release)	Expired 2012 Current	Behind The Scenes (Webisodes) Photo Gallery	Tenplay
Rush: The Complete Season 04	Streaming	13	September - November 2011 6 September 2019 (Re-Release)	Expired 2012 Current	Behind The Scenes (Webisodes) Photo Gallery	Tenplay

Note: The Rush Web Extras were NOT add back with The Re-Release on 10play.

== Awards and achievements ==
Awards and nominations
Year	Award	Category	Nominee(s)	Result
2011	Logie Awards	Most Popular Actor	Callan Mulvey	Nominated
2011	Logie Awards	Most Outstanding Actress	Catherine McClements	Nominated
2011	Logie Awards	Most Outstanding Drama	Rush	Nominated
2011	Logie Awards	Most Popular Drama	Rush	Nominated
2011	Screen Music Awards	Best Music in a drama series or serial	Stephen Rae (for episode 3.16)	Nominated
2010	AFI Awards	Best Television Drama Series	Rush – John Edwards and Mimi Butler	Won
2009	AWGIE Awards	Television Series	John O'Brien and Christopher Lee (for episode 1.04)	Won
2009	Logie Awards	Graham Kennedy Award for Most Outstanding New Talent	Ashley Zukerman	Nominated
2009	Logie Awards	Most Outstanding Actor	Callan Mulvey	Nominated
2009	Logie Awards	Most Outstanding Actress	Claire van der Boom	Nominated
2009	Logie Awards	Most Outstanding Drama Series, Miniseries or Telemovie	Rush	Nominated
2008	AFI Awards	Best Television Drama Series	Rush – John Edwards and Mimi Butler	Nominated
2008	AFI Awards	Best Lead Actor in a Television Drama	Callan Mulvey	Nominated

== International broadcasters ==
Country	Channel	Year	Dubbed or Subtitled?
India	FOX Crime	2009 –	Dubbed
Ireland	RTÉ One	2009 –	
Norway	TV2	2009 –	Subtitled
Czech Republic	AXN	2009 –	Dubbed
Serbia	AXN	2009 –	Subtitled
Slovakia	AXN	2009 –	Subtitled
Hungary	AXN	2009 –	Dubbed
Poland	AXN, TV4	2009 –	Voice-over
Belgium	vtm	2009 –	Subtitled
Hong Kong	FOX Crime	2009 –	Subtitled
South Africa	MNET	2009 –	
Saudi Arabia & the Arab World	MBC 4	2009 –	Subtitled
Saudi Arabia & the Arab World	MBC Action	2009 –	Subtitled
Romania	AXN	2009 –	Subtitled
Portugal	AXN	2009 (Pilot); 2010 (Regular broadcast) –	Subtitled
Tuvalu	Television Tuvalu	2010 –	
Spain	Nitro; Cuatro	2010	Dubbed
New Zealand	TV One	2010 –	
Italy	IPTV di Telecom Italia	2010 –	Dubbed
Italy	Rai Premium	2012 –	Dubbed
Estonia	Fox Crime	2010 –	Subtitled
Finland	YLE TV2	2010 –	Subtitled
Bulgaria	AXN	2011 –	Dubbed
Israel	IBA 3	2011 –	Subtitled
Philippines	GMA News TV	2012 –	Dubbed
Taiwan	PTS Main Channel; HiHD	2012 –	Subtitled
Iran	IRIB 1	2013 –	Subtitled
United States	Hulu, Tubi TV	2013	Entire series available for streaming on Tubi TV
France	Numéro 23	2014 –	Both
Germany	AXN	2015 –	Dubbed
United Kingdom	Alibi	2019 –	Series 1–4 shown consecutively, daily, at 5:00pm from 4 February 2019 to 15 May 2019

== See also ==
- List of Australian television series
