= Samuel Johnson (actor) =

Australian actor (born 1978)

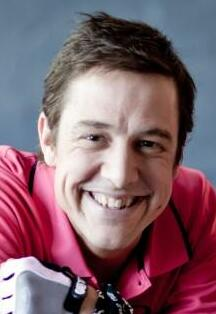
- Born: Samuel Joseph Johnson; 8 February 1978 (age 48); Daylesford, Victoria, Australia
- Occupation: Actor
- Years active: 1995–present
- Relatives: Connie Johnson (sister)

Samuel Joseph Johnson OAM (born 8 February 1978) is an Australian actor. He is best known for his roles as Evan Wylde in the television series The Secret Life of Us for which he won the AFI award for Best Performance by an Actor in a Leading Role in a Telefeature in 2001, Leon Broznic in Rush, Toby Kirby in After the Deluge and as Molly Meldrum in the miniseries Molly for which he won the AACTA Award for Best Lead Actor in a Television Drama and won the Gold Logie for Most Popular Personality on Television of 2017.

Since 2012, Johnson has led fundraising efforts for the charity Love Your Sister, which he co-founded with his sister Connie Johnson.

== Early life ==
Born in 1978, Johnson was born and raised in Daylesford, Victoria and educated at Wesley College, Melbourne. He was raised by his father, together with his two older sisters, Constance and Hilde. When Johnson was a toddler, his mother died by suicide. His father was a writer, so the family moved around a lot so that he could write.

At the age of 14, he performed in his first school play, cast in a role as Dreyfus in The Pink Panther Strikes Again. On opening night he was spotted by Rhonda Schepisi, former wife of director Fred Schepisi. Taking the reins, she helped Johnson acquire an Equity card and find auditions.

"So I figuratively got a phone call on the first night I'd ever been in a play. She marched me to the union and demanded that they give me a card, then she drove me to an agent and demanded they take me on. It was somewhat fortuitous and I happened to get the first 20 or so jobs I went for. This career was certainly not designed by me."

Prior to his discovery, his family were going through some financial difficulty. His father had enough money to pay for one of them to go to a private school for a term. "He chose me despite the fact that my sister had a better academic record. And by the end of the first term, I was earning enough to pay for the school fees that we couldn't afford. I was very lucky. I got an opportunity and I made the most of it." With the money he earned through his acting, they were able to pay off the school fees and eventually started their own family business, a chain of second-hand bookstores around Melbourne.

== Career ==
=== Television ===
Johnson's first foray into television started with small roles in various shows including the role of Prince Jobah in The New Adventures of Ocean Girl; as Sally Fletcher's first boyfriend, Gus Bishop, in Home and Away; and in other bit parts including Blue Heelers, Halifax f.p., Stingers and Something in the Air.

His break, however, came in 2001 when he was chosen for the role of the scruffy, womanising writer Evan Wylde in Channel 10's drama series The Secret Life of Us. Evan was a main character, also narrating the majority of the show (apart from instances narrated by Deborah Mailman's character Kelly Lewis). This made Johnson a household name and earned him an AFI Award in 2001 for Best Actor in a Leading Role in a Television Drama Series.

The Secret Life of Us enjoyed consistent success up until the third series, when many major characters left, resulting in a drop in ratings. Johnson's character Evan (one of the last three original major characters alongside Kelly Lewis and Simon Trader) left early in the fourth series in 2004 and the show was axed soon afterwards.

In 2003, during the height of Johnson's Secret Life career, he received rave reviews for his performance in the mini-series After the Deluge. It follows the story of the Kirby family; their father Cliff is in the advanced stages of Alzheimer's disease, and relives his disturbing memories of the war and his first love, as a part of his experiences of the present. His three estranged sons Alex (David Wenham), Marty (Hugo Weaving) and Toby (Johnson) are thrown together to care for their father whilst struggling with their own lives and relationships and attempting to come to terms with their father's mental state.

Apart from Johnson's appearances on many Australian shows to promote his work, he has also featured on Thank God You're Here and The Panel as well as the ABC documentary The Sum of Sam; documenting his personal struggles and work with Open Family Australia, a youth outreach program co-founded by South Melbourne parish priest Fr Bob Maguire.

Johnson appeared in the police drama Rush in Melbourne, a drama revolving around Melbourne's Tactical Response team (based on Critical Incident Response-style teams). He played the role of communications specialist Leon Broznic; alongside Callan Mulvey and Catherine McClements who played Evan's girlfriend Carmen in The Secret Life of Us.

In 2010, he made a cameo appearance as an old friend of Sarah's in the final episode of Wilfred.

In 2016, Johnson starred as Molly Meldrum in the miniseries Molly.

In 2019, he competed and won the 16th season of Network 10's Dancing with the Stars, with professional partner Jorja Freeman, and raised $50,000 in prize money for his charity Love Your Sister.

=== Film ===
Johnson's first film role was in the 1995 film Angel Baby where he played Check-Out Cashier. Angel Baby was the tale of two people suffering from schizophrenia who meet at therapy and fall in love. The film was a huge success, sweeping the board at the 1995 AFI Awards.

Johnson is also well known for his role in the 2002 Mick Molloy film Crackerjack. Playing Molloy's slacker pothead flatmate Dave Jackson, the film enjoyed relative success winning a host of awards including Outstanding Comic Screenplay and Outstanding Film Comedy at the Australian Comedy Awards in 2003.

After leaving The Secret Life of Us in 2004, Johnson went on to star in the dark, black comedy The Illustrated Family Doctor as Gary Kelp, a man condensing The Illustrated Family Doctor medical guide. Unfulfilled in every way, Gary starts to develop the physical symptoms of the ills he is transcribing and his life begins to really fall apart. The film divided viewers and critics, with the film resulting in a love-it-or-hate-it divide and was nominated for a handful of awards including Best Adapted Screenplay at the 2005 AFI Awards.

=== Voice-overs and commercials ===
Johnson provided a voice-over for Vodafone, also appearing in their advertisements. Early in his career, Johnson also lent his voice to commercials for Hungry Jack's, as well as a number of other brands.

=== Radio ===
In 2005/06, Johnson joined Nova 100, hosting the 9am – 12pm slot. He was popular in the role, but resigned mid-2006, several months after his girlfriend Lainie Woodlands died.

=== Theatre ===
In July 2007, Johnson appeared on stage playing a young Weary Dunlop in the play Weary: The Story of Sir Edward Dunlop. The play follows the ageing veteran after retirement, when he returns to the diaries of his time in a World War II POW camp. The action switches between the young Weary and his older, wiser self.

Johnson's other stage credits include: Love Letters, Hotel Sorrento, The Present, The Snake Pit, Mad Woman’s Fountain, Life During War Time and The Pink Panther Strikes Again.

== Credits ==
=== Television ===
Title	Year	Role	Type
1994	Ocean Girl (aka Ocean Odyssey)	Robert 'Rocky' Rhodes	13 episodes
1995	Home and Away	Gus Bishop	11 episodes
1995–1997	Blue Heelers	Glen Rigby / Dennis Cole	2 episodes
1997	Raw FM	Adams	1 episode
1997–1998	Good Guys Bad Guys	Dermott Maginnis	5 episodes
1998	Stingers	Murray Best	Season 1, episode 9: "Jellybabies"
1998	Wildside	Troy Cunningham	1 episode
1999	Thunderstone	Duane	2 episodes
1999	Halifax f.p.	Jamie Callen	Season 4, episode 1: "Someone You Know"
2000	Something in the Air	Dermot Yates	7 episodes
2000	The New Adventures of Ocean Girl	Prince Jobah	10 episodes
2001–2004	The Secret Life of Us	Evan Wylde / Narrator	Seasons 1–4, 72 episodes
2002	The Secret Life of The Secret Life of Us	Interviewer	TV special
2003	After the Deluge	Toby Kirby	Miniseries
	Australian Story: The Sum of Sam	Himself	Documentary special
2007	Lonely Planet's Bluelist Australia	Host	4 episodes
2008–2011	Rush	Leon Broznic	Episodes 1–70
2009	Underbelly: A Tale of Two Cities	Jack Smith	Season 2, 6 episodes
2009	Beyond the Darklands	Narrator	9 episodes
2010	Sleuth 101	Cache	1 episode
2010	The Pacific	Adam	Miniseries, 1 episode
2010	Wilfred	Sam	1 episode
2011	Small Time Gangster	Gary	5 episodes
2013	Paper Giants: Magazine Wars	Paul Cavanagh	Miniseries, 2 episodes
2013	Rush: Underground	Leon Broznic	Miniseries (also writer / producer)
2014–2015	Gold Coast Cops	Narrator	Seasons 1–2, 20 episodes
2015	The Secret River	Saggity	Miniseries, 2 episodes
2015	Hipsters	Presenter	6 episodes
2016	The Wizards of Aus	Terry	2 episodes
2016	Molly	Molly Meldrum	Miniseries, 2 episodes
2017	Anh's Brush with Fame	Self	Episode: "Samuel Johnson: In Memory of Connie"
2018–current	Paramedics	Narrator	
2019	Dancing with the Stars	Contestant (Winner – with Jorja Freeman)	Season 16, 10 episodes
2021	Eden	Ezra Katz	Miniseries, 6 episodes
2023	Year Of	Tristan Kellaway	3 episodes

=== Film ===
Title	Year	Role	Type
1995	Angel Baby	Check-Out Cashier	Feature film
1996	Inner Sanctuary	Carl	
1997	One Way Ticket	Jimmie	TV movie
1997	Bloodstained Angels	Glen Rigby	
1997	The Last of the Ryans	Young Journalist	Film
1997	What You Can	Adams	
1999	Strange Fits of Passion	Josh	Feature film
1999	Taken		
2001	ICQ	Eric	
2001	Sparky D Comes to Town	Stretch	
2002	New Skin	Sten	
2002	Crackerjack	Dave Jackson	Feature film
2003	The House of Names	Cleveland	
2004	The Illustrated Family Doctor	Gary Kelp	Feature film
2005	Hole in the Wall		
2005	Ten Feet Tall	Tim	
2006	Dead Rain	Josh	
2008	$9.99	Dave Peck (voice)	Animated feature film
2012	Crawlspace	Matthews	Feature film
2023	Dying Minutes	Watch VO	Short film

=== Video game ===
Title	Year	Role	Type
2003	Shadowbane	Voice	Video game

=== TVC and voiceovers ===
Year	Title	Notes
2001	Pedders – 'No Bull Tires'	Voiceover
2002	TAFE NSW	Voiceover
2002	Listerine	Voiceover
2002–2003	Lovable	Actor
	Hungry Jack's	Voiceover
	Southern Cross Austereo	Voiceover
	Fox FM	Voiceover
	Suzuki – Suzuki Alto	Voiceover
	Pedigree Petfoods	Voiceover
	Milo	Voiceover
	Red Rooster	Voiceover
	Myer	Print advertising model
	David Jones	Print advertising model
	Vodafone	Voiceover / actor

=== Radio ===
Title	Year	Role	Type
2005–06	Nova 100	Presenter	Radio show

=== Theatre ===
Title	Year	Role	Type
1992	The Pink Panther Strikes Again	Dreyfus	Wesley College, Melbourne with Adamson Theatre Co
1997	Life During War Time	Howard	Melbourne Athenaeum with Soup Kitchen Theatre Co
1998	The Present	Danny Rule	Carlton Courthouse with La Mama Theatre
1998	Hotel Sorrento	The Son	Malthouse Theatre with Playbox Theatre, Melbourne / Hit Productions
2005	Love Letters	Andrew Makepeace Ladd III	NIDA Parade Theatre
2007	Weary: The Story of Sir Edward Dunlop	Weary Dunlop	Australian tour
2009	Secret Bridesmaids' Business	Groom	Australian tour
2010	Men	Guy #1	Fortyfivedownstairs
2011–13	The Haunting of Daniel Gartrell	Craig Castevich	Fortyfivedownstairs, Lismore City Hall & Australian regional tour
2015	White Rabbit, Red Rabbit		Pop-Up Theatre No. 3, Hobart with Tasmanian Theatre Company
2018	The Feather in the Web	Stage Manager	Stables Theatre, Sydney with Griffin Theatre Company
	The Snake Pit	Harry	Theatre in the Raw / Playbox Theatre, Melbourne
	Mad Woman’s Fountain	Harry	Theatre in the Raw / Playbox Theatre, Melbourne

=== Publications ===
Year	Title	Notes
2016	Love Your Sister	with Connie Johnson
2018	Dear Santa	
2019	Dear Dad	
2020	Heroes Next Door	with Hilde Hinton
2021	Dear Mum	
2021	My Life and Other Catastrophes	
2023	Dear Lover	

== Personal life ==
At age 11, Johnson's sister Connie was diagnosed with cancer, after a tumour was discovered in her leg. She died in September, 2017 of terminal breast cancer.

On 5 February 2006, his girlfriend Lainie Woodlands took her own life. Johnson and Woodlands' mother Kim then endured a bitter legal tug-of-war for two months with Lainie's estranged father to bury her close to her chosen home and those she loved. She was eventually buried by Johnson, Kim, Lainie's siblings and many close friends. Johnson took an extended career break to recover from the trauma and returned to Daylesford.

In late 2007, Johnson began a relationship with Sarah Hallam, a casting director. They have known each other since they were 15. He stated, "I am really enjoying my new life. It is very different from the other one ... out in the 'burbs with my girl and her little boy, who is five." They live in the outer suburbs of Melbourne with Hallam's young son, while running workshops for aspiring actors.

In September 2007, he was involved in a bar brawl at Star City Casino in Sydney. While attending a wedding with his girlfriend Hallam, he was involved in an altercation with another guest, Ben Benson. Johnson had repeatedly punched Benson before stomping on his head as he lay prone on the floor. The court was told that at the time of the offence Johnson was receiving treatment for depression following the suicide of his long-term partner Lainie Woodlands. Upon leaving the court, Johnson was completely remorseful for his actions, stating, "I am very sorry it all happened, I was a bit of a nincompoop and I'm glad that it's all over. I'm looking forward to moving on". He was given a 12-month good behaviour bond, with Johnson to continue with his counselling, and no conviction was recorded.

In May 2008, Johnson gave his first interview since the death of Woodlands to ABC Television's Australian Story – The Sum of Sam. He talked about the turmoil of the last three years – and his life changing involvement with Open Family Australia, a charity that works with vulnerable young people.

As of mid-2019, Johnson was living in his birthplace of Daylesford, near Melbourne.

In 2021, Johnson was involved in a serious road accident when he was hit by a car as a pedestrian in Melbourne's eastern suburbs. He received a serious knock to the head, resulting in an acute case Post Traumatic Amnesia for 11 days. Ground glass was found in his lungs, and his neck and skull had multiple fractures. He was in hospital for 6½ weeks.

Johnson won the Daylesford Tennis Championship for the second time just before his accident. His father, before him had won the Daylesford Tennis Championship six years in a row, from 1976 to 1981.

In January 2023, Johnson revealed his personal rift with Molly Meldrum, whom he portrayed in the miniseries Molly and had known personally for 20 years. The rift began when Meldrum hijacked Johnson's speech at the 2017 Logie Awards, which Johnson intended to use to call attention to the Love Your Sister charity.

== Fundraising ==
In 2003, Johnson rode from Sydney to Melbourne on a unicycle to raise money for children's cancer charity Canteen.

On New Year's Day 2012, he and his sister, Connie Johnson, started the Love Your Sister charity, which supports the Garvan Institute of Medical Research.

In 2013, Johnson began riding 15,000 km on a unicycle in a year-long attempt to break the Guinness World Record and raise $1 million for the Garvan Institute of Medical Research to find a cure for breast cancer. His stated mission is to remind every Australian woman about the need to be 'breast aware', in an effort to promote early detection and improve survival rates, via his charitable foundation, Love Your Sister.

On 14 February 2014, Johnson returned to the starting point of his journey, Melbourne's Federation Square, having travelled 15,955 km by unicycle, broken the world record for the longest unicycle journey and raised $1,477,630. In 2016, Johnson was awarded the Medal of the Order of Australia (OAM) for service to cancer research support organisations, and to the performing arts.

On 24 August 2019, Love Your Sister reached their initial goal of $10,000,000 raised.

== Awards and nominations ==
Year	Award	Category	Nominated work	Result
1999	AFI Awards	Best Lead Actor in a Television Drama	Wildside (episode 59)	Nominated
2001	AFI Awards	Best Lead Actor in a Television Drama	The Secret Life of Us	Won
2002	Logie Awards	Most Popular Actor	The Secret Life of Us	Nominated
2003	AFI Awards	Best Guest or Supporting Actor in a Television Drama or Comedy	After the Deluge	Nominated
2012	Maverick Movie Awards	Best Supporting Actor (short)	Auditioning Fanny	Won
2016	Order of Australia (OAM)	Medal of the Order of Australia	Service to cancer research support organisations and to the performing arts	Won
2016	AACTA Awards	Best Lead Actor in a Television Drama	Molly	Won
2017	Logie Awards	Most Outstanding Actor	Molly	Nominated
2017	Logie Awards	Most Popular Actor	Molly	Won
2017	Logie Awards	TV Week Gold Logie	Best Personality on Australian Television	Won
2018	Australian of the Year	Victorian Candidate	Cancer support work	Nominated
