= Love Child season 4 =

Love Child
- Season 4
- No. of episodes: 10

Release
- Original network: Nine
- Original release: 2 May – 4 July 2017

Season chronology
- ← Previous; Season 3

The fourth and final season of the Australian drama television series Love Child, began airing on 2 May 2017 on the Nine Network. The season consisted of ten episodes airing on Tuesday evenings at 9:00 pm.

== Cast ==
=== Main ===
- Jessica Marais as Joan Millar
- Mandy McElhinney as Matron Frances Bolton
- Harriet Dyer as Patricia Saunders
- Sophie Hensser as Viv Maguire
- Miranda Tapsell as Martha Tennant

=== Recurring ===
- Andrew Ryan as Dr Simon Bowditch
- Dan Hamill as Dr Andrew Patterson
- Sophia Forrest as Debbie
- Danielle Catanzariti as Elena
- Darcie Irwin-Simpson as Rita
- Ronan Keating as Dr Lawrence Faber

== Episodes ==
No. overall	No. in season	Title	Directed by	Written by	Original release date	Prod. code	Aus. viewers (millions)
27	1	"Episode One"	Geoff Bennett	Cathryn Strickland	2 May 2017	235930-27	0.683
June 1972. When Joan goes into early labour, the unorthodox new head of obstetrics is the only one who can help her. Matron has her hands full with three new pregnant girls in Stanton House. At the fountain Martha finds Patty on the ground deceased.
28	2	"Episode Two"	Geoff Bennett	Chris McCourt	9 May 2017	235930-28	0.659
Matron buries her doubts about the baby swap, while Joan struggles with life as a single mother. Martha vows to uncover the truth about Patty's mysterious death. Elena fears for her life when her brother discovers the truth about her pregnancy.
29	3	"Episode Three"	David Caesar	Fiona Samuel	16 May 2017	235930-29	0.595
Joan must compete for a permanent doctor's position against her friend Bowditch as well as a sexist rival with wandering hands. Meanwhile, the Stanton House girls steal Martha's car in an attempt to learn more about Elena's betrothed.
30	4	"Episode Four"	David Caesar	Fin Eduist	23 May 2017	235930-30	0.710
September 1972. Viv and Martha fight for their rights at the International Women's Day march. When Joan's baby falls ill, Matron is wracked with guilt over the possible baby swap. Debbie defies Matron by visiting her older, married lover.
31	5	"Episode Five"	Shannon Murphy	Vanessa Alexander	30 May 2017	235930-31	0.614
Joan attempts to bury her grief by throwing herself back into work. Meanwhile, Elena is torn between love and duty when the father of her child proposes marriage. Martha's first dinner party could end her marriage.
32	6	"Episode Six"	Shannon Murphy	Josephine D. Barrett	6 June 2017	235930-32	0.639
Rita refuses medical assistance that could save her and her baby's life. Simon confesses his role in the hit and run accident to Martha. Elena is shocked to discover her lover Ed is in critical condition in the hospital.
33	7	"Episode Seven"	Geoff Bennett	Chris Hawkshaw	13 June 2017	235930-33	0.662
Joan's world is upended when her ex-fiance arrives from London. Bowditch and Martha are blackmailed over the hit-and-run accident. Rita has second thoughts about returning to the convent following the birth of her baby.
34	8	"Episode Eight"	Geoff Bennett	Chris McCourt	20 June 2017	235930-34	0.670
November 1972. Joan makes a fateful decision about her future with Lawrence. Debbie's world is rocked when she discovers Matron has made a secret deal to adopt out her baby. Viv gives Matron a dose of her own medicine.
35	9	"Episode Nine"	Wayne Blair	Vanessa Alexander & Lara Radulovich & Wendy Hanna	27 June 2017	235930-35	0.699
Joan finds proof her baby was swapped at birth, while Matron embarks on a cover-up. Elena's wedding plans are ruined by Debbie's jealousy.
36	10	"Episode Ten"	Wayne Blair	Sarah Smith	4 July 2017	235930-36	0.696
November/ December 1972. Joan risks everything to be reunited with her missing child. Matron makes a shock announcement when she is accused of unethical behaviour. Debbie takes extreme action to locate Ed and reunite him with Elena.
