= Love Child season 1 =

Season of television series

Love Child
- Season 1
- Season 1 DVD
- No. of episodes: 8

Release
- Original network: Nine
- Original release: 17 February – 7 April 2014

Season chronology
- Next → Season 2

The first season of the Australian drama television series Love Child, began airing on 17 February 2014 on the Nine Network. The season concluded on 7 April 2014. The season consisted of 8 episodes and aired on Mondays at 8:40pm.

== Production ==
On 8 April 2013, the Nine Network announced a new drama project from Playmaker Media named Love Child, an eight-part drama series by the creators of House Husbands. Production for season one began in June 2013 and finished in September 2013.

== Cast ==
=== Main ===
- Jessica Marais as Joan Millar
- Jonathan LaPaglia as Dr Patrick McNaughton
- Mandy McElhinney as Matron Frances Bolton
- Ryan Johnson as Phillip Paige
- Ryan Corr as Johnny Lowry
- Ella Scott Lynch as Shirley Ryan
- Harriet Dyer as Patricia Saunders
- Sophie Hensser as Viv Maguire
- Gracie Gilbert as Annie Carmichael
- Miranda Tapsell as Martha Tennant

=== Recurring ===
- Maya Stange as Eva McNaughton
- Aileen Beale as Saleswoman Mark Foy's
- Lucy Wigmore as Carol

== Episodes ==
No. overall	No. in season	Title	Directed by	Written by	Original release date	Prod. code	Aus. viewers (millions)
1	1	"Episode One"	Shawn Seet	Sarah Lambert	17 February 2014	235930-1	1.587
1969. Joan Millar arrives at Kings Cross Hospital overly confident about her new midwifery job. Matron Frances Bolton forces the ladies – some heavily pregnant – to work at Stanton House. Joan clashes with both Frances and Dr. Patrick McNaughton. Patricia, Martha and Viv sneak out to find Mick Jagger. After a fall, Annie goes into labour and delivers a healthy baby girl which is immediately taken away. Shirley sneaks out to spend time with Johnny, only to be discovered by the ladies as a famous socialite.
2	2	"Episode Two"	Shawn Seet	Tim Pye & Guila Sandler	24 February 2014	235930-2	1.510
July 1969. After Joan undermines Frances and saves Shirley, she is offered a position at the medical team of King's Cross. Annie is sent back home and after trying desperately to discover what happened to her daughter, she leaves for Stanton House. When Shirley's in-laws arrive, Frances gives her a corset to hide her pregnancy and she collapses. Viv steals a television, she gets help from Joan's ex-boyfriend Phillip. Shirley reveals to Johnny that she has given a child away before. The ladies do everything in their power to try and watch the Moon Landing, resulting in Patricia buying a television.
3	3	"Episode Three"	Shirley Barrett	Sarah Lambert & Kym Goldsworthy	3 March 2014	235930-3	1.453
Joan finds the adoption agent having sex with a man and blackmails her into giving Annie custody of her daughter. After Annie discovers she can get her baby back, she and the girls work together to help her get ready. Shirley has troubles with Johnny after he does a nude run through the grounds of Stanton House. Patricia's mother arrives and tries to move her to another house. Martha and Patricia sneak out and buy Annie the necessities she needs to raise a baby. Joan reveals to Patrick that Laurence made her have an abortion. The Matron gets worried about her career and tells Annie that her baby died.
4	4	"Episode Four"	Shirley Barrett	Tim Pye & Matt Ford	10 March 2014	235930-4	1.410
After being told her baby died, Annie parties with the soldiers in a Sydney on their break from the Vietnam war. Viv watches an interview on television which shows that her brother is in Sydney and with the help of Joan, she meets up with him at a pub. Martha is confronted with her baby's father and it is revealed that he raped her and tried to force her to have an abortion. Viv makes the decision to run away but soon returns. Annie's baby becomes ill and Patrick deceives Annie to find out her family medical history.
5	5	"Episode Five"	Geoff Bennett	Sarah Lambert & Liz Doran	17 March 2014	235930-5	1.358
Shirley goes into premature labour and delivers a baby son after discovering Johnny was involved in a fight and is in gaol. Martha is surprised when Frances organises a job for her in the hospital administration offices which leads her to finding a clue about her mother. An infuriated Joan decides to complete her medical degree. Annie gets a job working at a club and when her boss hurts herself, Annie takes centre stage and becomes the performer for the night.
6	6	"Episode Six"	Geoff Bennett	Tim Pye & Kym Goldsworthy	24 March 2014	235930-6	1.426
Joan's world is rocked when she uncovers the truth about Annie's baby. Shirley's affair with Johnny is exposed when her husband returns injured from Vietnam. Annie's singing career takes off when she appears on TV show Bandstand.
7	7	"Episode Seven"	Grant Brown	Cathryn Strickland	31 March 2014	235930-7	1.522
November 1969. Joan wrestles with the consequences of telling Annie the truth about her baby, while Viv uncovers a disturbing secret about Matron.
8	8	"Episode Eight"	Grant Brown	Tim Pye	7 April 2014	235930-8	1.453
Joan fears the worst when Annie kidnaps her baby back from the McNaughton family, and Patricia's dreams for the future are shattered when her boyfriend finally visits Stanton House.
