= Love Child season 3 =

Season of television series

Love Child
- Season 3
- No. of episodes: 10

Release
- Original network: Nine
- Original release: 20 June – 1 August 2016

Season chronology
- ← Previous; Season 2 Next → Season 4

The third season of the Australian drama television series Love Child, began airing on 20 June 2016 and concluded on 1 August 2016 on the Nine Network. The season consisted of ten episodes airing on Monday evenings at 8:30 pm.

== Cast ==
=== Main ===
- Jessica Marais as Joan Millar
- Jonathan LaPaglia as Dr Patrick McNaughton
- Matthew Le Nevez as Jim Marsh
- Mandy McElhinney as Matron Frances Bolton
- Ella Scott Lynch as Shirley Ryan
- Harriet Dyer as Patricia Saunders
- Sophie Hensser as Viv Maguire
- Gracie Gilbert as Annie Carmichael
- Miranda Tapsell as Martha Tennant

=== Recurring ===
- Andrew Ryan as Dr Simon Bowditch
- Lincoln Younes as Chris
- Maya Stange as Eva
- Tiarnie Coupland as Maggie
- Jeremy Lindsay Taylor as Leon

== Episodes ==
No. overall	No. in season	Title	Directed by	Written by	Original release date	Prod. code	Aus. viewers (millions)
17	1	"Episode One"	Geoff Bennett	Tim Pye	20 June 2016	235930-17	1.010
It's 1970 and the times have changed. Joan is heartbroken to discover that an infection has left her almost certainly infertile, while delinquent teen, Maggie, is determined to discover the identity of her birth mother.
18	2	"Episode Two"	Geoff Bennett	Samantha Winston & Tim Pye	27 June 2016	235930-18	0.872
November 1970. Shirley fights to keep her job, as Maggie learns that Shirley is her birth mother. Joan uncovers McNaughton's part in Greg Mathieson's death, and Viv loses her twins all over again.
19	3	"Episode Three"	Mark Joffe	Cristine McCourt	4 July 2016	235930-19	0.896
While trying to deal with being blackmailed by McNaughton's wife, Joan rescues Maggie and other abused girls from Tarramar by agreeing to help Matron reopen her 'baby factory', Stanton House.
20	4	"Episode Four"	Mark Joffe	Cathryn Strickland	11 July 2016	235930-22	0.910
As Joan struggles to admit her likely infertility to Jim, Annie receives tragic news and must face the death of her father, but not before he encourages her to go to Vietnam as an entertainer.
21	5	"Episode Five"	Peter Andrikidis	Tim Pye	18 July 2016	235930-23	0.854
Viv goes to Vietnam to find her brother but ends up being in the care of her just-orphaned baby nephew. Joan confirms that Eva is pregnant, and Patty and Jim give in to lust.
22	6	"Episode Six"	Peter Andrikidis	Cathryn Strickland	25 July 2016	235930-24	0.779
Viv is forced to leave her orphaned nephew behind in Vietnam.
23	7	"Episode Seven"	Geoff Bennett	Cristine McCourt	25 July 2016	235930-25	0.726
Joan is devastated when Jim does a runner to avoid jail, taking baby James with him.
24	8	"Episode Eight"	Geoff Bennett	Tim Pye	31 July 2016	235930-26	0.797
Annie is injured at an anti-war protest and fears that she may lose her unborn child. Joan's career is in trouble due to her role in Eva's pregnancy. Shirley makes a life-changing decision to help Maggie keep her baby.
25	9	"Episode Nine"	Grant Brown	Cathryn Strickland	1 August 2016	235930-20	0.835
McNaughton is prepared to give up his career to help Joan and Jim evade criminal charges. A drunken bucks' night ruins Patty's plans for Martha's wedding to Bowditch. Viv faces a problem when Pete proposes to her.
26	10	"Episode Ten"	Grant Brown	Tim Pye	1 August 2016	235930-21	0.773
August 1971. Martha and Bowditch enter into wedded bliss, and Annie and Chris decide to elope. As Jim prepares to escape to Queensland with Joan and James, Joan discovers she is pregnant, doesn't tell Jim, and decides to stay behind in Sydney.
