= Love Child season 2 =

Love Child
- Season 2
- No. of episodes: 8

Release
- Original network: Nine
- Original release: 5 May – 23 June 2015

Season chronology
- ← Previous; Season 1 Next → Season 3

The second season of the Australian drama television series Love Child, began airing on 5 May 2015 on the Nine Network. The season concluded on 23 June 2015. It consisted of 8 episodes and aired on Tuesdays at 8:40pm.

== Cast ==
=== Main ===
- Jessica Marais as Joan Miller
- Jonathan LaPaglia as Dr Patrick McNaughton
- Matthew Le Nevez as Jim Marsh
- Mandy McElhinney as Matron Frances Bolton
- Ella Scott Lynch as Shirley Ryan
- Harriet Dyer as Patricia Saunders
- Sophie Hensser as Viv Maguire
- Gracie Gilbert as Annie Carmichael
- Miranda Tapsell as Martha Tennant

=== Recurring ===
- Ben O'Toole as Pete
- Lincoln Younes as Chris Vesty
- Jessica June as Tania
- Andrew Ryan as Simon Bowditch
- Marshall Napier as Greg Matheson
- Ian Bolt as Bob Flannery
- Maya Stange as Eva McNaughton

== Episodes ==
| No. overall | No. in season | Title | Directed by | Written by | Original release date | Prod. code | Aus. viewers (millions) |
|---|---|---|---|---|---|---|---|
| 9 | 1 | "Episode One" | Shawn Seet | Cathryn Strickland | 5 May 2015 | 235930-9 | 1.107 |
31 December 1969-1 January 1970. Joan’s new career as a doctor is threatened when she helps a pregnant teen. Viv’s estranged mother tries to take control of her life. Annie learns a harsh lesson as a single mother in 1970s Kings Cross.
| 10 | 2 | "Episode Two" | Shawn Seet | Jane Allen | 12 May 2015 | 235930-10 | 1.040 |
Joan is obsessed with finding the father of Gail's baby. Viv finds an unlikely ally in Matron as she suffers through a difficult labour. Shirley receives a surprise telegram from Vietnam.
| 11 | 3 | "Episode Three" | Shawn Seet | Tim Pye | 19 May 2015 | 235930-11 | 1.152 |
Patricia refuses to sign adoption papers for her unborn baby, with tragic results. Joan gets closer to finding the family of Gail's orphaned baby. Matron's world is rocked when her biological son is released from prison.
| 12 | 4 | "Episode Four" | Geoff Bennett | Christine McCourt | 26 May 2015 | 235930-12 | 1.059 |
April 1970. Joan finds herself in the middle of a violent custody battle over Gail's baby. Patricia faces a crisis when she travels to Melbourne to marry her Prince Charming. Martha is obsessed with seeing Queen Elizabeth during the 1970 royal tour.
| 13 | 5 | "Episode Five" | Geoff Bennett | Jane Allen | 2 June 2015 | 235930-13 | 1.098 |
The custody battle over Jim's baby becomes deadly serious. Joan receives a surprising proposal. Annie is deemed an unfit mother when her baby goes missing. Patricia has a life-changing encounter with some hippies.
| 14 | 6 | "Episode Six" | Geoff Bennett | Tim Pye | 9 June 2015 | 235930-14 | 1.054 |
April 1970. Joan puts the welfare of Jim's baby ahead of her career. Matron makes a deal with the devil in order to save Stanton House from closure. Annie gets closer to Chris, unaware of his history.
| 15 | 7 | "Episode Seven" | Lynn-Maree Danzey | Tamara Asmar & Tim Pye | 16 June 2015 | 235930-15 | 1.023 |
June 1970. Martha's reunion with her birth mother turns into a nightmare. Joan and Jim's relationship is blown apart by a secret from her past. Annie is distraught to learn she is pregnant again.
| 16 | 8 | "Episode Eight" | Lynn-Maree Danzey | Tim Pye | 23 June 2015 | 235930-16 | 1.061 |
In the season final, Joan makes a terrible choice to save her husband. Matron fights a desperate battle to keep Stanton House open. McNaughton makes a fateful decision that has a drastic impact on Joan and Jim's future.
