= Mercedes College =

Mercedes College may refer to:

- Mercedes College (Adelaide)
- Mercedes College, Perth
