= Ben Schumann =

Australian actor

- Born: Melbourne, Australia
- Occupation: Actor
- Years active: 2003–present
- Website: benschumann.com

Ben Schumann is an Australian actor, perhaps best known for his role as Ed Newman in the Fox8 teen drama series, SLiDE and also as Franco Galluzo in Holly's Heroes.

Prior to being cast in SLiDE, Schumann made a number of guest appearances in television dramas, including Rush, City Homicide and Neighbours. He made his feature film debut in Moonlite, followed by a recurring role in Tangle and an appearance in John Doe: Vigilante.

== Filmography ==
Year	Title	Role	Production type
2003	Blue Heelers	Rhys Alderton	2 episodes
2004	Noah and Saskia	Arthur	1 episode
2005	Webster Say	Webster	Short film
2005	You and Your Stupid Mate	Kid 1	
2005	Little Oberon	Young Dennis	Television film
2005	Holly's Heroes	Franco Galluzo	25 episodes
2006	Neighbours	Topher Gray	
2006	Neighbours	George Sanders	
2007	Fast Lane	Ash	Short film
2007	Kick	Marco	11 episodes
2007	Neighbours	Ray Lowe	
2009	City Homicide	Dylan Thomas	1 episode
2009	Rush	Adam	1 episode
2009	Snake Tales	Goober	13 episodes
2010	Oscar's First Kiss	Oscar	Short film
2011	Killing Time	Ian Shanks	1 episode
2011	SLiDE	Ed Newman	10 episodes
2011	Moonlite	Gus	
2012	Miss Fisher's Murder Mysteries	Derek Philips	1 episode
2012	John Doe: Vigilante	Boy	Feature film
2012	Tangle	Harvey	
2013–2014	House Husbands	Ryan	16 episodes
2014	It's a Date	Tonka	1 episode
2015	Now Add Honey	Ryan	Film
2015	The Flame Wars	Ben	
2018	Olivia Newton-John: Hopelessly Devoted to You	Young John	1 episode
2019–2023	Five Bedrooms	Timmy Doyle	8 episodes
2019	Delete History	Dirk Johnson	Web series
