= Hey, Hey, It's Esther Blueburger =

2008 film

Hey Hey It's Esther Blueburger
- Theatrical release poster
- Directed by: Cathy Randall
- Written by: Cathy Randall
- Produced by: Miriam Stein
- Starring: Danielle Catanzariti; Keisha Castle-Hughes; Toni Collette
- Cinematography: Anna Howard
- Edited by: Dany Cooper
- Music by: Guy Gross
- Production company: Tama Films
- Distributed by: Miramax Films (through Buena Vista International)
- Release dates: 9 February 2008 (Berlin); 20 March 2008 (Australia)
- Running time: 103 minutes
- Country: Australia
- Language: English
- Budget: A$6 million
- Box office: A$863,950

Hey Hey It's Esther Blueburger is a 2008 Australian independent teen film written and directed by Cathy Randall. It stars Danielle Catanzariti, Keisha Castle-Hughes and Toni Collette. The film follows Jewish 13-year-old Esther (Catanzariti), an outcast at her posh school, where she has no friends. That changes when she meets nonconformist Sunni (Castle-Hughes) from the local public school.

With Esther's character based loosely on her own adolescence, Randall was inspired to write the film's script by what she saw as a lack of role models for teenage girls. In 2002, the script earned her a fellowship to the Los Angeles Film School's Feature Development Programme, where she developed the project, and it was later picked up by Tama Films. Randall returned to Australia for casting, and Catanzariti was eventually chosen in the lead role after she attended an audition for minor roles and extras. Production spanned from October to December 2006, with filming taking place in Adelaide, South Australia and Sydney.

The film premiered on 9 February 2008 at the Berlin International Film Festival and was released in Australia on 20 March 2008. It failed to earn back its A$6 million budget with a total domestic gross of approximately $800,000. The film attracted mixed reviews; some critics praised the originality and the acting, though others found Randall's direction dull and the script poorly written. Catanzariti won the Australian Film Institute's Young Actor Award for her performance, and the film received a further three AFI nominations and a nomination for a Film Critics Circle of Australia Award.

== Plot ==
Esther Blueburger is a 13-year-old Jewish outcast at her posh private school. Things are no better at home, where her twin brother is beginning to develop into a sociopath and her controlling mother pressures Esther to conform. She finds her only friend in a duck called Normal, and she frequently prays into a toilet asking God to "get me out of here". After escaping her own Bat Mitzvah, Esther bumps into Sunni, a rebellious girl from the local public school, who she had observed and spoken to on previous occasions.

The two girls form a friendship, and Esther begins attending Sunni's school, unbeknownst to her parents, under the guise of a Swedish exchange student. She revels in the easygoing nature of the public school and enjoys spending time with Sunni's friends and Sunni's laid-back single mother, Mary, who works as a stripper. As Esther gains popularity and submits to numerous acts of peer pressure – including attacking a girl from her old school – her friendship with Sunni starts to deteriorate. At her old school, meanwhile, her classmates have been led to believe that she was chosen for an elite social experiment, and when she returns she is treated like royalty.

Esther later discovers that Mary has died in a motorcycle accident, and a grieving Sunni is transferred to Esther's private school under her grandmother's care. Ultimately deciding that being true to herself is more important than fitting in, Esther discards her pretenses and renews her friendship with Sunni.

== Cast ==
- Danielle Catanzariti as Esther Blueburger
- Keisha Castle-Hughes as Sunni Kaire
- Toni Collette as Mary
- Christian Byers as Jacob Blueburger
- Essie Davis as Grace Blueburger
- Russell Dykstra as Osmond Blueburger
- Jonny Pasvolsky as Mr. Hooper
- Cassandra Jinman as 'The Slug'
- Janay Mosby as Vanessa
- Yen Yen Stender as Lissy
- Caitlin McDougall
- Deidre Rubenstein as Mrs Fleisher
- Edwin Hodgeman as Rabbi

== Production ==
=== Development ===
Cathy Randall's script for Hey, Hey, It's Esther Blueburger stemmed from her desire "to make a film about a kick-ass chick, a heroine for teenagers and people of all ages", wanting to take a female twist on The Catcher in the Rye's Holden Caulfield. She said that she had "always been struck by the fact that there are not enough role models for teenage girls". Esther's character was drawn loosely from Randall's own adolescence; like Esther, she had a Bat Mitzvah, she had a twin brother and she attended both a private and a public school. She explained, however, that the story was "warped and twisted and filtered through my imagination so, in fact, it doesn't feel like Esther resembles me at all".

Based on her original script, Randall was awarded a fellowship to the Los Angeles Film School's Feature Development Programme in 2002. She said that, under the mentorship of the school's faculty, "The screenplay evolved by becoming lighter and funnier and also the story and structure got tighter." In 2003, Randall was nominated for an Australian Writers' Guild AWGIE Award for Best Unproduced Screenplay. Randall's script was subsequently picked up by producer Miriam Stein and her production company, Tama Films. Stein said that "The script resonated with me from the start", particularly because of her similar adolescent experience as a Jewish girl who felt like an outsider. Stein brought the film into production after recruiting Nice Pictures CEO Heather Ogilvie as executive producer, Los Angeles-based Harry Clein as associate producer and Buena Vista International to handle distribution in Australia and New Zealand.

=== Casting ===
To cast the title character, the film's producers worked with a casting agent to find experienced actors but also held open auditions for 12- to 15-year-old girls in search of "a new face". The producers had spent four months overseeing over 3,000 girls' auditions before Danielle Catanzariti attended a cattle call audition advertised in a local newspaper for minor roles and extras. Randall asked Catanzariti to stay behind and read a scene from the script; she went to a number of callback auditions and was later offered the main role. Having been raised in the Catholic faith, Catanzariti took lessons in Jewish history and Hebrew to prepare for her Bar Mitzvah scenes.

Keisha Castle-Hughes was Randall's first choice for the role of Sunni based on her performance in the New Zealand film Whale Rider (2002). Castle-Hughes agreed to star in the film when she first read the script at age 13, but was 16 by the time finance had been raised and filming began. Castle-Hughes' pregnancy was announced shortly before production was scheduled to begin but filming went ahead unaffected. Toni Collette was confirmed to have joined the cast in May 2006; her scenes were filmed over one week.

=== Filming ===
Filming took place from 30 October to 15 December 2006. The film was shot on location in Adelaide, South Australia and Sydney, with financial incentives from the South Australian Film Corporation. Specific filming locations included Annesley College, St Peter's College as Esther's school and Marryatville High School as Sunni's school.

== Soundtrack ==
Hey, Hey, It's Esther Blueburger: Original Soundtrack

Soundtrack album by Various Artists
- Released: 14 March 2008
- Label: Capitol Music Group

The film's opening song and recurring theme, "The Only One" was composed by Paul Mac and recorded by Mac, Bertie Blackman and the Sydney Children's Choir. The Sydney Children's Choir's contributions to the soundtrack were Randall's own idea, inspired by the children's chorus covers from The Langley Schools Music Project. The original score was composed by Guy Gross.

=== Track listing ===
1. "The Only One" – Paul Mac (featuring Bertie Blackman)
2. "Don't You Think It's Time" – Bob Evans
3. "I Melt with You" – Sydney Children's Choir
4. "Ribbons" – Guy Gross
5. "The Wrong Girls" – Missy Higgins
6. "Bar Mitzvah Prep" – Guy Gross
7. "Clapping Song" – Operator Please
8. "Be a Woman" – Persian Rugs
9. "Lucky Lipstick" – Surferosa
10. "The Only One (Duck Dissection)" – Paul Mac (featuring the Sydney Children's Choir)
11. "Esther on Stage" – Guy Gross
12. "6/8" – Operator Please
13. "Duck Walk" – Guy Gross
14. "Sometimes" – Danielle Catanzariti and the Sydney Children's Choir
15. "Long Live the Girls" – Sara Storer
16. "Young Folks" – Chasing Bailey
17. "Strange Little Girl" – Sydney Children's Choir
18. "Liar" – Bob Evans
19. "The Only One (Toy Piano)" – Paul Mac
20. "Bar Mitzvah Meldey Hora" – Ilan Kidron and Glass

== Release ==
Hey, Hey, It's Esther Blueburger had its world premiere at the Berlin International Film Festival on 9 February 2008 before it was released theatrically in Australia on 20 March 2008. It was later screened at numerous international film festivals, including the Dungog Film Festival, Hamburg Filmfest, Washington Jewish Film Festival, London Australian Film Festival, Toronto Jewish Film Festival, Los Angeles Jewish Film Festival, San Francisco Jewish Film Festival, Boston Jewish Film Festival and the Stockholm International Film Festival.

The film earned A$393,000 from 134 locations on its opening week at the box office. Its total gross surpassed $600,000 by the next week, having taken a per-screen average of $1,123 over its second weekend. By the end of 2008, the film had earned a total gross of $800,000 at the Australian box office, making it the fifth highest-grossing Australian film of the year, but it still failed to earn back its initial budget of $6 million. Variety magazine critic Richard Kuipers attributed the film's poor performance in part to its "M" (mature audiences) classification by the Office of Film and Literature Classification although the film was targeted at preteens and teenagers.

== Reception ==
=== Critical reaction ===
Film industry magazine Screen International critic Peter Brunette noted that in spite of minor faults, the film was "an otherwise enjoyable piece of highly competent, commercial filmmaking," which "should perform well in all markets, from theatrical through to ancillary." In a review for The Age, Jake Wilson gave the film 3 stars out of 5, describing it as "a quirky Australian coming-of-age story that gives the genre a good name". He wrote that while it lacked the film "craft or pizazz" of other teen movies, the film broke the conventions of the genre. The Sydney Morning Herald's Sandra Hall awarded Hey, Hey, It's Esther Blueburger 3 out of 5 stars and thought that it was entertaining but "too polished". She praised the acting, particularly from Danielle Catanzariti and Russell Dykstra, but felt that the script lacked spontaneity. Margaret Pomeranz and David Stratton of At the Movies each gave the film 3.5 stars out of 5. Stratton enjoyed the "terrific" performances, namely from Catanzariti and Keisha Castle-Hughes, while Pomeranz praised the film's "eccentricity" and the discomfort caused to the audience at times.

Other critics were less positive. The Herald Sun's head reviewer Leigh Paatsch gave the film no stars, claiming the film tried to match the edginess of the 2007 comedy film Juno but was, "way, way off the mark". He wrote, "If you think the title screams 'Go watch something else', just wait until you get a load of this lame local production." Jim Schembri of The Age opined that the film was an example of "just how bad local [Australian] films can get". In particular, he criticised the "stiff" performances, the "woeful" directing and the plot's implausibility. Variety magazine's Richard Kuipers wrote that the film was "sporadically amusing" and lacked "scripting smarts and pulling power across demographics". He praised the soundtrack and Castle-Hughes' portrayal of Sunni, but felt that the film was brought down by dull cinematography and "uninspired dialogue and direction". Bernadette McNulty of The Daily Telegraph noted that the film's greatest downfall was that "the jokes aren't funny enough and the sadness barely breaks your heart". She complimented Toni Collette's performance but felt that "her slight role is insufficient to make it fly the distance". Luke Goodsell, writing for Empire magazine, awarded the film 2 out of 5 stars and deemed it to be deserving of "an all-purpose warning label to stay the Hell away".

=== Awards and nominations ===
Danielle Catanzariti won the Australian Film Institute's Young Actor Award for her performance as Esther. The film received three other AFI Award nominations for Best Screenplay – Original (Cathy Randall), Best Costume Design (Shareen Beringer) and Best Sound (Liam Egan, Tony Murtagh, Phil Judd and Des Keneally). Catanzariti was nominated by the Film Critics Circle of Australia for the FCCA Best Actress Award. Randall won an award for directing at the Hamburg Filmfest Michel Children's and Youth Film Festival.

== Box office ==
Hey, Hey, It's Esther Blueburger grossed $863,950 at the box office in Australia.

== See also ==
- Cinema of Australia
