= List of Love Child episodes =

Love Child is an Australian television drama. It was created by Sarah Lambert, the co-creator of House Husbands. It premiered on the Nine Network on 17 February 2014. The show focuses on Dr Joan Millar (Jessica Marais), a doctor who works alongside Dr Patrick McNaughton (Jonathan LaPaglia) and Matron Frances Bolton (Mandy McElhinney) at the fictional Kings Cross Hospital's Stanton House for pregnant girls who are unmarried. During the course of the programme, 36 episodes of Love Child aired over four series.

== Series overview ==
Series	Episodes	Originally released	
Series	Episodes	First released	Last released
1	8	17 February 2014	7 April 2014
2	8	5 May 2015	23 June 2015
3	10	20 June 2016	1 August 2016
4	10	2 May 2017	4 July 2017

== Episodes ==
=== Series 1 (2014) ===
No. overall	No. in season	Title	Directed by	Written by	Original release date	Prod. code	Aus. viewers (millions)
1	1	"Episode One"	Shawn Seet	Sarah Lambert	17 February 2014	235930-1	1.587
2	2	"Episode Two"	Shawn Seet	Tim Pye & Guila Sandler	24 February 2014	235930-2	1.510
3	3	"Episode Three"	Shirley Barrett	Sarah Lambert & Kym Goldsworthy	3 March 2014	235930-3	1.453
4	4	"Episode Four"	Shirley Barrett	Tim Pye & Matt Ford	10 March 2014	235930-4	1.410
5	5	"Episode Five"	Geoff Bennett	Sarah Lambert & Liz Doran	17 March 2014	235930-5	1.358
6	6	"Episode Six"	Geoff Bennett	Tim Pye & Kym Goldsworthy	24 March 2014	235930-6	1.426
7	7	"Episode Seven"	Grant Brown	Cathryn Strickland	31 March 2014	235930-7	1.522
8	8	"Episode Eight"	Grant Brown	Tim Pye	7 April 2014	235930-8	1.453

=== Series 2 (2015) ===
No. overall	No. in season	Title	Directed by	Written by	Original release date	Prod. code	Aus. viewers (millions)
9	1	"Episode One"	Shawn Seet	Cathryn Strickland	5 May 2015	235930-9	1.107
10	2	"Episode Two"	Shawn Seet	Jane Allen	12 May 2015	235930-10	1.040
11	3	"Episode Three"	Shawn Seet	Tim Pye	19 May 2015	235930-11	1.152
12	4	"Episode Four"	Geoff Bennett	Christine McCourt	26 May 2015	235930-12	1.059
13	5	"Episode Five"	Geoff Bennett	Jane Allen	2 June 2015	235930-13	1.098
14	6	"Episode Six"	Geoff Bennett	Tim Pye	9 June 2015	235930-14	1.054
15	7	"Episode Seven"	Lynn-Maree Danzey	Tamara Asmar & Tim Pye	16 June 2015	235930-15	1.023
16	8	"Episode Eight"	Lynn-Maree Danzey	Tim Pye	23 June 2015	235930-16	1.061

=== Series 3 (2016) ===
No. overall	No. in season	Title	Directed by	Written by	Original release date	Prod. code	Aus. viewers (millions)
17	1	"Episode One"	Geoff Bennett	Tim Pye	20 June 2016	235930-17	1.010
18	2	"Episode Two"	Geoff Bennett	Samantha Winston & Tim Pye	27 June 2016	235930-18	0.872
19	3	"Episode Three"	Mark Joffe	Cristine McCourt	4 July 2016	235930-19	0.896
20	4	"Episode Four"	Mark Joffe	Cathryn Strickland	11 July 2016	235930-22	0.910
21	5	"Episode Five"	Peter Andrikidis	Tim Pye	18 July 2016	235930-23	0.854
22	6	"Episode Six"	Peter Andrikidis	Cathryn Strickland	25 July 2016	235930-24	0.779
23	7	"Episode Seven"	Geoff Bennett	Cristine McCourt	25 July 2016	235930-25	0.726
24	8	"Episode Eight"	Geoff Bennett	Tim Pye	31 July 2016	235930-26	0.797
25	9	"Episode Nine"	Grant Brown	Cathryn Strickland	1 August 2016	235930-20	0.835
26	10	"Episode Ten"	Grant Brown	Tim Pye	1 August 2016	235930-21	0.773

=== Series 4 (2017) ===
No. overall	No. in season	Title	Directed by	Written by	Original release date	Prod. code	Aus. viewers (millions)
27	1	"Episode One"	Geoff Bennett	Cathryn Strickland	2 May 2017	235930-27	0.683
28	2	"Episode Two"	Geoff Bennett	Chris McCourt	9 May 2017	235930-28	0.659
29	3	"Episode Three"	David Caesar	Fiona Samuel	16 May 2017	235930-29	0.595
30	4	"Episode Four"	David Caesar	Fin Eduist	23 May 2017	235930-30	0.710
31	5	"Episode Five"	Shannon Murphy	Vanessa Alexander	30 May 2017	235930-31	0.614
32	6	"Episode Six"	Shannon Murphy	Josephine D. Barrett	6 June 2017	235930-32	0.639
33	7	"Episode Seven"	Geoff Bennett	Chris Hawkshaw	13 June 2017	235930-33	0.662
34	8	"Episode Eight"	Geoff Bennett	Chris McCourt	20 June 2017	235930-34	0.670
35	9	"Episode Nine"	Wayne Blair	Vanessa Alexander & Lara Radulovich & Wendy Hanna	27 June 2017	235930-35	0.699
36	10	"Episode Ten"	Wayne Blair	Sarah Smith	4 July 2017	235930-36	0.696

== Ratings ==
Love Child : AUS viewers per episode (millions)

Season	Episode number									
Season	1	2	3	4	5	6	7	8	9	10
1	1.587	1.510	1.453	1.410	1.358	1.426	1.522	1.453	–	
2	1.107	1.040	1.152	1.059	1.098	1.054	1.023	1.061	–	
3	1.010	0.872	0.896	0.910	0.854	0.779	0.726	0.797	0.835	0.773
4	0.683	0.659	0.595	0.710	0.614	0.639	0.662	0.670	0.699	0.696

Source: Audience measurement performed by OzTam
