= John Doe: Vigilante =

- Film poster
- Directed by: Kelly Dolen
- Screenplay by: Stephen M. Coates
- Story by: Stephen M. Coates; Kelly Dolen
- Starring: Jamie Bamber; Daniel Lissing; Lachy Hulme
- Cinematography: David Parker
- Edited by: James Cole
- Music by: David Hirschfelder
- Production companies: Rapidfire Entertainment; Screen Corporation
- Release date: 21 March 2014 (USA)
- Running time: 93 Minutes
- Country: Australia
- Language: English

John Doe: Vigilante (also known as John Doe) is a 2014 Australian crime thriller, directed by Kelly Dolen. The story is written by Kelly Dolen and Stephen M.Coates. The screenplay was written by Stephen M.Coates. The film stars Daniel Lissing, Jamie Bamber, Lachy Hulme and Ditch Davey.

== Plot ==
John Doe (Jamie Bamber) is an ordinary man who decides to take the law into his own hands after the unsolved murder of his wife and nine-year-old daughter. John Doe then exacts justice by killing other criminals, one at a time. He films the process and sends it to the media. However, the mainstream media edits the films, showing only the execution, not the reason. John Doe then gives the films to a smaller outfit, which publishes them uncut, on the internet.

A movement in support of John Doe's actions ("Speak for the Dead") begins to publicize information about John Doe's "victims" - pimps, rapists, and paedophiles - criminals who were arrested, sentenced and, upon their release, reoffended.

At a night club, two bouncers eject and assault a teenage boy. He dies and the judge acquits the bouncers due to their father, the owner of the club bribed him. John Doe kills one of the bouncers with a home-made cyanide patch after he harasses a woman in the elevator. This inspires copycat vigilantes. Three teenage boys decide to kill the other bouncer but, instead, the bouncer kills all three as he is on high alert after the death of his brother. This causes the movement to organise more, and the next scene shows the bouncer is ambushed by a larger group and he is killed after one of the vigilantes fractures his skull.

One of the three teenage boys was a patient of John Doe. The question arises whether John Doe had "influenced" the boys to carry out the actions on his behalf. Later John Doe films his interaction with Adam, the criminal who killed his wife and daughter. The whole incident is broadcast live, and John Doe removes his mask. He offers Adam an opportunity to plead his case and be allowed to live. Adam at first claims he committed his crimes due to an abusive past and begs for mercy. John Doe doesn't buy this however, with Adam soon admitting this was lies and aggressively showing no remorse. After this, John Doe kills him while people are watching the act live.

He turns himself in afterward and is tried for thirty three murders. Before the jury can deliver its verdict, he is interviewed by journalist Ken Rutherford in jail, talking of his motives for the killings and the movement he's inspired. John Doe seems to bite a cyanide capsule which he had inside a fake tooth at the end, killing himself. However, after Ken calls in the guards to stop him, it turns out this was a ploy. John Doe kills Ken, after revealing he'd chosen him specifically for his interview since he had tortured and murdered a young man, becoming his final target. The video of him killing the young man is then broadcast the next day, making John Doe’s support to swell immensely.

The jury delivers its verdict the next day, but whether it is guilty or not guilty isn't revealed before John Doe's followers attack the courthouse and rescue him by setting a bomb off while firing at the crowd gathered outside. He escapes with them, and the film ends with him on the loose.

== Cast ==
- Jamie Bamber as John Doe / Mr Jones.
- Daniel Lissing as Jake
- Lachy Hulme as Ken Rutherford, an investigative journalist whom John Doe requested to meet a day before the jury makes its decision.
- Ditch Davey as Detective Clint James
- Sam Parsonson as Murray Wills
- Paul O'Brien as Officer J. Callahan
- Chloe Guymer as Chloe
- Louise Crawford as Leah
- Ben Schumann as Boy
- Fletcher Humphrys as Henry Junig
- Brooke Ryan as Mary
- Gary Abrahams as Sam

== Reception ==
The film received mixed to negative reviews from critics, receiving a rating of 40% on Rotten Tomatoes with an average rating of 3.8/10 based on 5 reviews.
