= Slide (TV series) =

- Also known as: SLiDE
- Genre: Teen drama Comedy
- Starring: Adele Perovic; Ben Schumann; Brenton Thwaites; Emily Robins; Gracie Gilbert
- Theme music composer: Shave
- Opening theme: "Change Your Heart" (SLiDE Mix)
- Country of origin: Australia
- Original language: English
- No. of seasons: 1
- No. of episodes: 10

Production
- Production locations: Brisbane, Queensland, Australia
- Running time: 45 minutes (approx.)
- Production companies: Hoodlum; Playmaker Media

Original release
- Release: 16 August – 18 October 2011

Slide (styled as SLiDE) is an Australian teen drama series which premiered on the Fox8 subscription television channel and aired from 16 August to 18 October 2011. The series followed the lives of five teenagers making their way into adulthood in the city of Brisbane. FOX8 confirmed in February 2012 a second season was not commissioned.

The series was multi-platform and encouraged the viewer to view extra content online via apps and social networking such as Facebook and Twitter. Webisodes of events that take place before and after each episodes — titled Before and After Bits — are also available on the show's official YouTube account. The series was the second multi-platform scripted series on Australian television, after the ABC's Fat Cow Motel in 2004.

On 16 August 2012, the show premiered on the American cable network TeenNick.

== Plot ==
SLiDE tells the story of five Brisbane teenagers in their final year of high school making their way from school to adulthood. Tammy and Ed have been friends since they were five years old. Luke knows Ed from scouts and school, but he moves in a different crowd. Eva is at school with them but she keeps to herself. They all spend their weekends in The Valley, seeing music, going to parties, stealing experiences they're not yet entitled to. When Scarlett arrives from Melbourne an unlikely friendship grows between the five teenagers.

== Cast and characters ==
=== Main ===
Ed Newman (Ben Schumann) is the central character of the show. He spends most of his time with Tammy Lane who has been his best friend since they were five. They had made pact to lose their virginity with each other if they couldn't find anyone else. Ed has also been friends with Luke Gallagher since they were kids, but they began moving with different crowds a few years back. Ed is a geek who develops a crush on Scarlett Carlyle when they first meet at her father's hotel where Ed works. He is very socially awkward and is quite embarrassed about being a virgin for the first episode, but remedies the situation with his neighbour, Philippa, early on. After trying to get a fake I.D and getting caught, he finally gets into notorious club "Duck Duck" after Eva steals an I.D and Ed, posing as a transgender woman, gets let in. Upon entry, he spontaneously kisses his boss from the catering job he did earlier that day, sparking a real kiss between them. Eva sleeps with him after he gets depressed because he kissed a man and he tries more than ever to fit in with the crowd. In episode 5, he begins to like Eva after their one night stand and he is not sure how to approach her. In episode 7, Scarlett kisses Ed as a goodbye present for leaving the gang unexpectedly. In episode 8, Ed loses a chance of getting a car and he says to Phillipa, "fucking you was the worst mistake I ever made!". Which prompts her to show the video of them having sex to the whole mall as revenge for him being mean to her. When Tammy sees the video, she angrily punches Ed in the nose and their friendship is strained a bit. In episode 10, he admits he loves Tammy and has sex with her at Luke's house, then finds out Tammy later on sneaks out and has sex with Luke. Ed is extremely preoccupied with sex and being cool, which leads him to do terrible things to his friends.

Tammy Lane (Gracie Gilbert) is Ed's best friend, a perfectionist and hard worker. She's considered the "mom" of the group as she's the most responsible and careful. She has an eccentric dress sense and is an aspiring music journalist and frequents music gigs in the Valley. She initially dislikes Scarlett, her complete opposite, having labelled her a "troll" in the first episode. Tammy is frequently thought of as a stereotypical good girl but occasionally attempts to break her image. She has a budding crush on Luke as he finds he also has one for her and their relationship progresses throughout the season. With her opening up more, she finds that she can accomplish anything that she sets her mind on, if only she were as confident as Scarlett. Episode 4 finds Luke getting jealous at other men watching her as they both work at a party, her being labelled a "prostitute dressed in lycra." They end up in the club and finally get together, much to Scarlett's jealousy. In episode 6, she breaks it off with Luke after she finds out he had sex with Scarlett on her couch in episode 3 and in episode 8, she hints at feelings for Ed but then feels that he has betrayed her when it is revealed he had sex with Phillipa and didn't tell her. In episode 10, she wants to lose her virginity after school is over, she then goes to Luke's house and loses her virginity to Ed after he tells her he loves her. She later sneaks out and also has sex with Luke after he also confesses he loves her and Eva catches them.

Scarlett Carlyle (Emily Robins) is a fashion-conscious, spoilt girl that lives in a fancy hotel. Originally from Melbourne, her mother sent her to live with her father at Urban Hotel in Brisbane due to her troublesome behaviour. Being that her father is constantly busy with work, she feels that she must be bad in order to get any attention from her father. After meeting Ed in episode 1, she arranges a birthday party for him, telling him to invite heaps of popular people. When everyone arrives, Ed and Tammy are nowhere to be seen, the party gets out of control after Luke texts everyone he knows to join them. After a burning lounge chair falls off the top of the penthouse building in the hotel, she gets into a heated argument with her father. Episode 3 finds her trying to vie also for Luke's attention, but she sees that he is infatuated with Tammy instead and continuously tries to get him to pay attention to her. In episode 7, after she gets expelled from school she makes the gang spend the day trying to make her happy as a goodbye gift. It's revealed that as popular as she seems, she never really had true friends back in Melbourne and the gang is all she has. Simultaneously, the gang realises that Scarlett is the reason why they're such a close knit group of friends as she's the one who brought them all together. Later that day she blackmails her parents into letting her stay with her dad at the hotel after she finds them in bed together. In episode 9, she's seen to be actually studying for the exams.

Eva Lee (Adele Perovic) is a rebellious tough girl with pink hair and an "eff you" attitude who speaks the truth and doesn't hold back. Known to be a lone wolf, she finds comfort in the graffiti art she puts up all over Brisbane. She first meets Scarlett in detention and later burns the word "sanctuary" on the school grass. After spontaneously sleeping with Ash (whom she met in episode 3), she finds out that she isn't as tough as she thought and that her new-found friends may be exactly what she needed all along. In episode 6, she thinks she's pregnant and travels to a music festival to find Ash. Later on, when she gets her period at the hospital, she sadly ends things with Ash. Eva is adopted and in one episode meets her biological brother and was close to meeting her birth mother, but ended up deciding against it. Although she loves her adoptive parents, she constantly feels pressured by them to stop doing graffiti and be more serious by pursuing a professional lifestyle in the medical field. She later disappoints them when she skips the exam. In the last episode, she catches Luke and Tammy having sex. She's last seen driving her scooter on a highway.

Luke Gallagher (Brenton Thwaites) is the cool attractive surfer guy that everyone wants to date. After meeting Tammy, he finds that he is deeply attracted to her. Not feeling anything like it before, he is unsure how to approach her as she is very different from the girls he's used to. After getting jealous of other men staring at Tammy at a party Ed, Tammy and himself worked at, he realises that he can't let any opportunity slip through his fingers and begins to open up to her more. While in the infamous "Duck Duck" night club, he kisses her after much sexual tension throughout the first few episodes. Luke's parents died when he was younger and he lives with his serious no-nonsense older brother, Dylan, a firefighter. In episode 9, he got in a car accident and suffers a concussion. Later when Ed chickens out at the exam, he writes Ed's name on his own paper out of generosity. In the last episode, Dylan tries to sell their house much to the dismay of Luke. When a man claims Dylan owes him a debt, and holds his friends captive in the house, Luke reveals Dylan has a gambling problem and probably wanted to skip town to avoid paying his debt. Luke then makes Dylan take the house off the market and implies the gang can be his new roommates. He later confesses he loves Tammy and has sex with her, not knowing she just had sex with Ed.

=== Recurring ===
- Hayley Magnus as Phillipa – Tammy and Ed's neighbour. She is socially awkward and has a crush on Ed. At the end of episode 2, they make-out and have sex. In episode 8, after Ed insults her, Phillipa broadcasts a video she had secretly recorded of the two having sex in the mall for everyone as payback. In the last episode, she's seen at the music festival and later invites everyone over for a house party at Luke's.
- Ben Oxenbould as Tony Carlyle – Scarlett's wealthy father who owns a hotel. He and Scarlett have an estranged relationship. In one episode, Scarlett uses her discovery that her divorced mother and father are having an affair as leverage to get what she wants.
- Steve Rodgers as Pete Newman – Ed's father
- Rebecca Frith as Rebecca Newman – Ed's mother
- Roz Hammond as Rosie Lane – Tammy's mother who is a musician.
- Wesley Ambler as Charli Lane – Tammy's effeminate younger brother.
- Mitzi Ruhlmann as Annabel Cartwright – A younger student from the group's school who Scarlett and Eva meet in detention. In episode 2, it's revealed that her mother is a sex worker, however, Annabel is unaware of her mother's true profession, believing her to be an event planner.
- Lincoln Lewis as Dylan Gallagher – Luke's older brother who took care of him after their parents died. In Luke's webisode on the SLiDE website, it's revealed that he "parties all night and sleeps all day". Dylan is a fireman, and he also seems to be very short-tempered and violent. Dylan wants to sell their family home, but later it is revealed that he has a gambling problem. Instead of selling their house, Luke makes him keep the house and he decides to move away to get a fresh start.
- Damon Gameau as Ash – A music producer who Eva falls for. They have sex on a beach at South Bank and he later reveals that he's married. Ash returns in episode 6 when Eva worries that she may be pregnant with his child. When she gets her period, they sadly end things between each other.

== Production ==
The series was a co-production between Hoodlum and Playmaker Media for Foxtel. The ten part, hour-long television series was devised as a multiplatform online/television drama, for FOX8. It featured an online and social media experience (utilizing Facebook and Twitter) to communicate with the audience, including a graphic novel that coincided with the events of the series. The series was commissioned as part of Foxtel's initiative to produce more Australian-made content across its owned channels and encourage Australian production to other cable channels in Australia. Fox8 commissioned ten episodes for the first season, the biggest scripted project that FOX8 has ever commissioned.

A response to an e-mail regarding the show's future from a Fox8 representative stated "We can confirm that Season 2 will not be back for 2012, but may be revisited further down the track."

== Critical reception ==
Many articles and blogs have compared the series to the British series Skins. Early screenings of the first episode had the series be described as "furiously funny and fearlessly frank" and has been likened to a more upbeat, comedy focused version of the British series Skins. Online media blog TV Tonight said about the series, "it is hard not to pigeon-hole the show as an 'Australian Skins.' But this is lighter in tone, if less emotional. Bris-Vegas offers a little more hope and sunshine than bleak Bristol, but in its first outing there isn't as much character."

== Episodes ==
No.	Title	Directed by	Written by	Original release date
1	"Episode 1"	Shawn Seet	Shanti Gudgeon	16 August 2011
2	"Episode 2"	Shawn Seet	Nicky Arnell	23 August 2011
3	"Episode 3"	Shawn Seet	Mark Lamprell & Chris Phillips	30 August 2011
4	"Episode 4"	Shawn Seet	Shanti Gudgeon	6 September 2011
5	"Episode 5"	Garth Maxwell	Shaun Grant & Matt Ford	13 September 2011
6	"Episode 6"	Garth Maxwell	Shaun Grant & Matt Ford	20 September 2011
7	"Episode 7"	Tori Garrett	Shanti Gudgeon	27 September 2011
8	"Episode 8"	Tori Garrett	Ian Meadows	4 October 2011
9	"Episode 9"	Garth Maxwell	Matt Ford	11 October 2011
10	"Episode 10"	Garth Maxwell	Shanti Gudgeon	18 October 2011

== Home video release ==
The first and only season of Slide was released on DVD for Region 4 on 15 March 2012. The series is also available for digital download on iTunes.

== Filming locations ==
- St Joseph's Nudgee College, Brisbane
- Urban Hotel, Brisbane
- Fortitude Valley, Brisbane
- South Bank, Brisbane
- Westfield Garden City, Upper Mt Gravatt
- Yeronga Swimming Pool, Brisbane
- Wilston Village, Wilston
- Surfers Paradise, Gold Coast
