= St Francis de Sales College =

Coordinates: 35°04′00″S 138°52′02″E

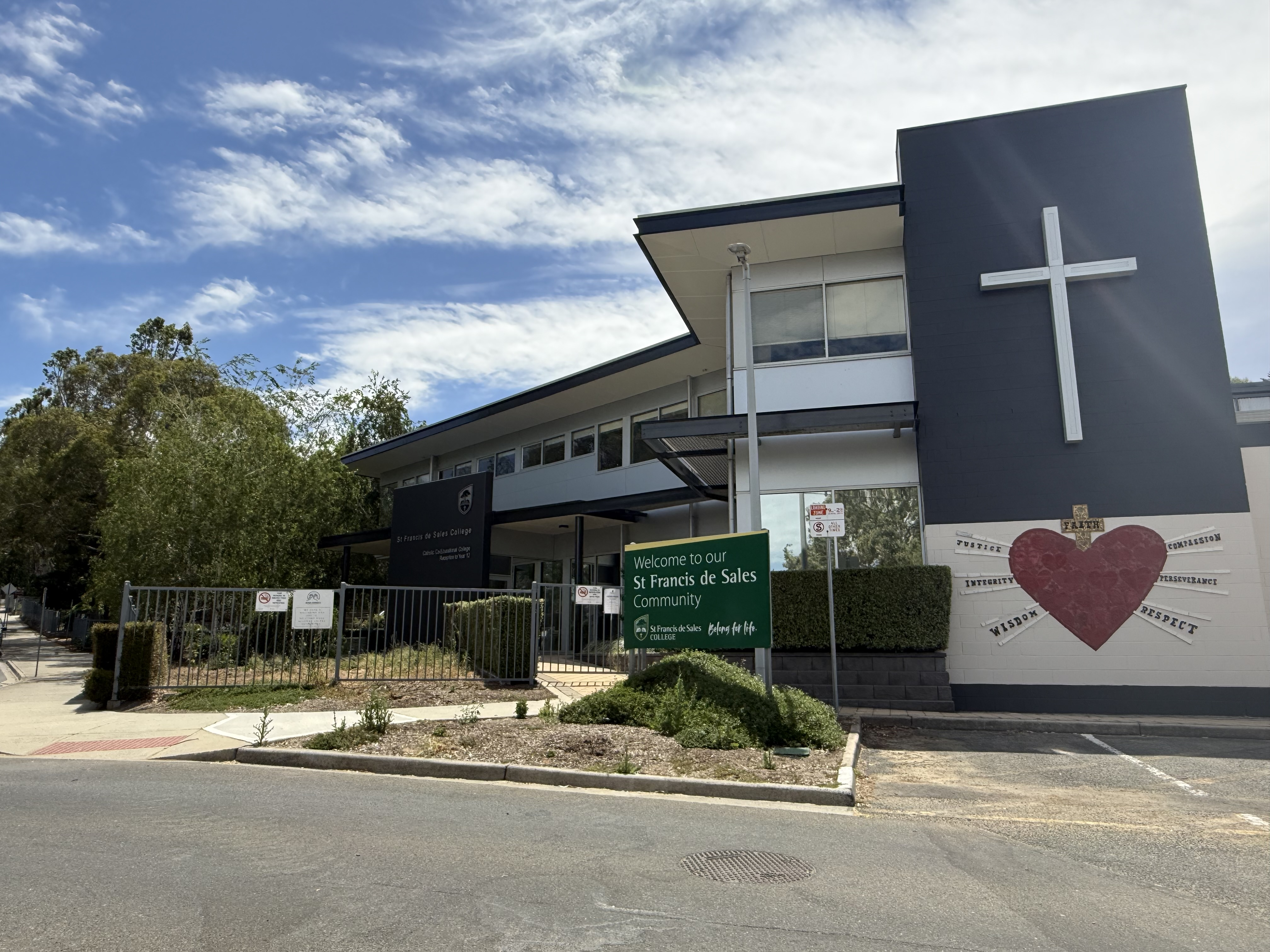
- Main college entrance, January 2026
- 8 Dutton Road, Mount Barker, South Australia

Information
- Type: Catholic
- Motto: Belong for Life
- Established: 1902
- Principal: Andrew Baker
- Enrolment: 1047
- Colours: Bottle Green; Light Green; Wattle Yellow; Grey
- Website: stfrancis.catholic.edu.au

St Francis de Sales College is a Reception to Year 12 Catholic co-educational school located in Mount Barker, South Australia.

== History ==
The college was established in 1902 by the Sisters of Mercy, under the name St. Scholastica binding the Young Ladies High School, the convent boarding school for Girls, and the primary school. The college grew to 46 day students and 64 boarding students by 1945, continuing to grow until 1958 where, with a population of 130 students, the school expanded into a new building separate from the Convent known as The Dell. The new building opened the following year, providing classrooms, teachers' room, a toilet block and a verandah.

In 1963, the Parish Priest of Mount Barker, Fr Kelly, felt there was need for a secondary school in the area, however these plans to expand the college were shelved as it was not seen financially or practically viable for the community. In 1977, the Sisters of Mercy withdrew from teaching at the college, before becoming known as the Mount Barker Parish School in 1978, staffed entirely by lay teachers. With continual growth of the primary school, more buildings were developed with an increased student population of youths now travelling by bus from Woodside and Balhannah. In 1986, the Mount Barker Parish School again changed its name to the St Francis de Sales Parish School, named after Bishop of Geneva and patron saint of writers and journalists, St Francis de Sales.

With several suggestions to the South Australian Commission for Catholic Schools (SACCS) years preceding, approval was given for the development of a secondary school within the college in 1998. The first transportable buildings arrived in December 1998 before opening in 1999, now serving as a R-12 Catholic Co-Educational College. The expansion was complemented with another change of name, now known as St Francis de Sales College. The first Year 12 students graduated at the end of 2003 with their South Australian Certificate of Education (SACE).

The college has continued to grow to cater for students across the Mount Barker and Adelaide Hills districts, reaching families in many surrounding suburbs.

=== Redevelopment ===
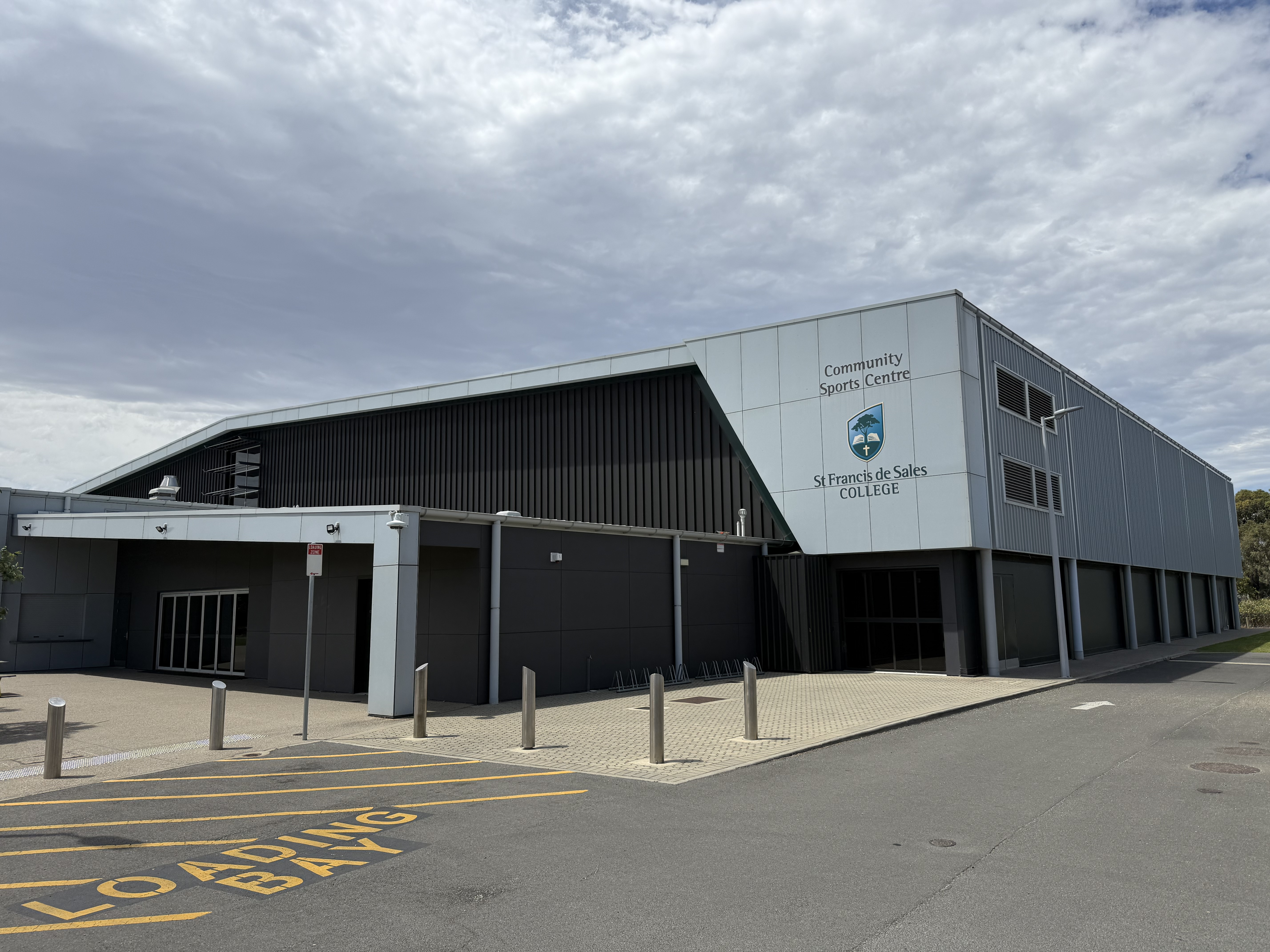
St Francis de Sales Community Sports Centre, January 2026

In August 2017, plans for a $27 million redevelopment of the college were approved by Catholic Education South Australia. These developments, while primarily funded by the college, were contributed to by the State Government and the Mount Barker District Council. The build would consist of a Community Sports Centre, a new Reception to Year 6 Primary School and an Early Learning Centre.

In 2018, the $10.2 million St Francis de Sales Community Sports Centre was opened by Minister for Recreation, Sport and Racing, Corey Wingard, Mayor of Mount Barker, Ann Ferguson and Director of Catholic Education South Australia, Dr Neil McGoran.

In 2020, the second stage of development commenced; the new Junior School and Early Learning Centre being completed later that year, providing state-of-the-art facilities for R-6 students and younger learners. In November 2021, these facilities were awarded the New Construction/New Individual Facility over $8m Award and the overall winner of the SA Awards for Excellence in Educational Facilities at the 2021 Learning Environments Australasia South Australia and Northern Territory Awards.

== House system ==
Until 2007, the College used the house names Sturt (blue), Flinders (green), and Barker (red). In 2007, alongside the increasing number of students, an additional yellow house was added and all houses were renamed to an important place in the life of St Francis de Sales, as described below.

House	Coat of Arms	Description
Savoy	Crown	Named after the City that St Francis de Sales was born in on 21 August 1567.
Padua	Book	St Francis de Sales studied Law here in 1588.
Geneva	Mitre	Named after the city where St Francis de Sales was bishop, Doctor of the Universal Church.
Lyon	Lion	Named after the city in France where St Francis de Sales died on 28 December 1622.

== Notable alumni ==
- Danielle Catanzariti, actress
