= Mercedes College, Perth =

Private single-gender school in Perth, Western Australia

Mercedes College
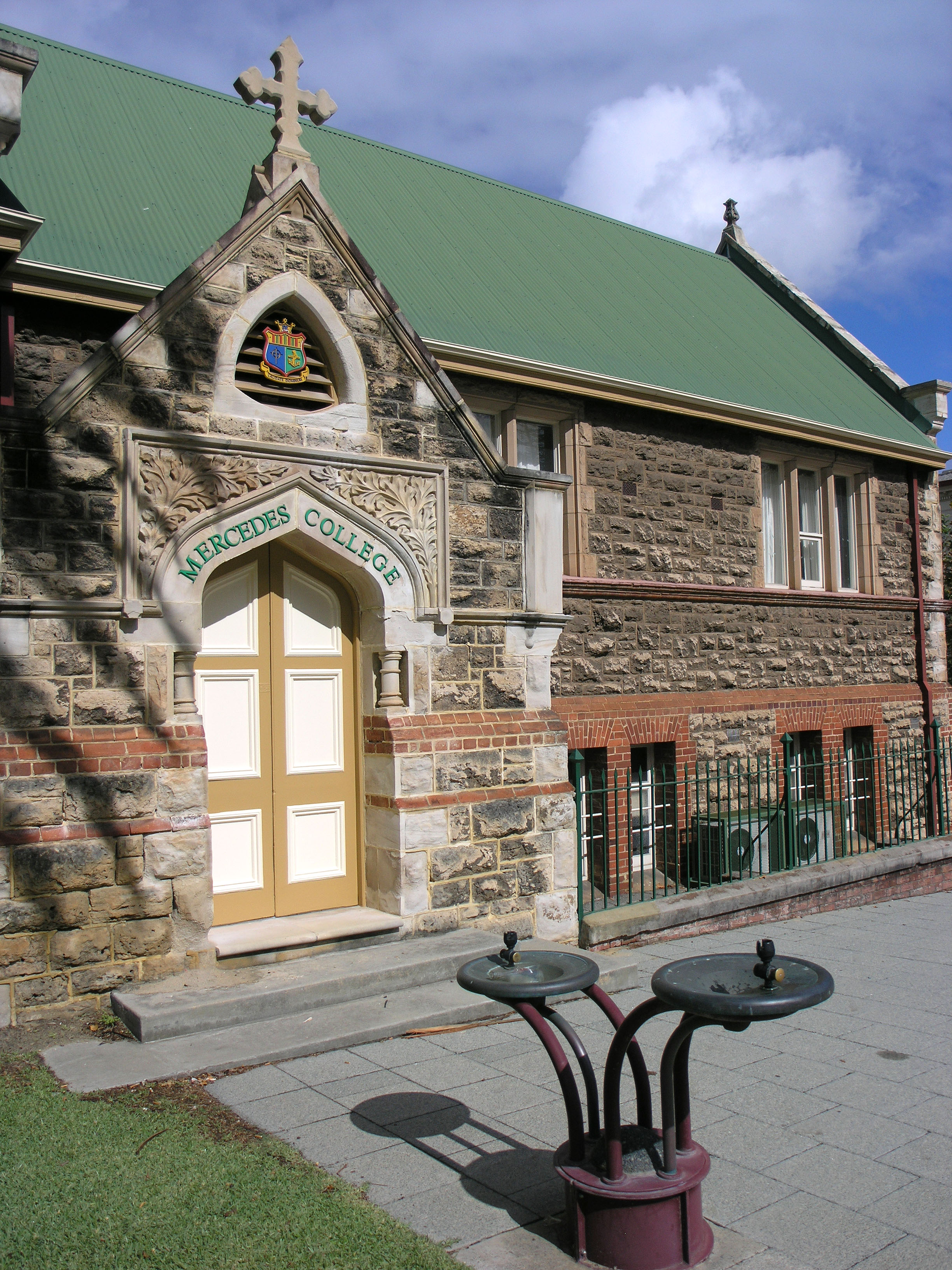
- Mercedes College, viewed from Victoria Square

Location
- Perth, Western Australia; Australia; 31°57′22″S 115°51′59″E

Information
- Type: Independent single-sex secondary day school
- Motto: Latin: Laudate Dominum ('Praise the Lord')
- Denomination: Roman Catholicism
- Established: 1846; 180 years ago
- Founders: Sisters of Mercy
- Sister school: Trinity College, Perth
- Principal: Lucie McCrory
- Staff: 138
- Years: 7–12
- Gender: Girls
- Enrolment: ~1,000
- Colours: Green, red, white
- Affiliation: Alliance of Girls' Schools Australasia
- Website: www.mercedes.wa.edu.au

Mercedes College is an independent Roman Catholic single-sex secondary day school for girls, located in the Perth central business district, Western Australia.

The school was founded in 1846 by the Sisters of Mercy, thus making it the oldest independent Catholic girls' school in Australia, and the oldest existing secondary school in Perth. There are currently 800 students from Year 7 to Year 12 and the college's brother school is Trinity College. The current principal is Lucie McCrory.

The name Mercedes comes from the Spanish word for mercy.

== History ==
The school has its beginnings in the landing at the Swan River Colony of Irish Sisters of Mercy. Led by Sister Ursula Frayne, they founded the first Catholic school in the colony on 2 February 1846 beginning their teaching with just one pupil. Classes were conducted in a rented St Georges Terrace cottage, near Victoria Avenue. By the end of the first day's teaching, the numbers had swelled to six students. Enrollment grew to 100 by the end of 1846, by which time the school had moved to permanent accommodation at Victoria Square.

The first Mercy Convent in Australia was constructed in 1847 on the Victoria Square site, and remains in use today, known as "Holy Cross Convent".

Two separate schools were run from the Victoria Square site. The original was known as St Joseph's School, and was a free, co-educational school. The other school run from the site was Ladies' College, opened in 1896, which did charge for tuition. It was later renamed Our Lady's College. The two schools amalgamated in 1967 to form Mercedes College. The last of the school's boarding students left in 1981.

Over the years, the number of Sisters of Mercy at the site has dwindled, with the last Mercy Sister Principal of Mercedes, Sister Assisium Wright, retiring in 1996.

== Gallery ==
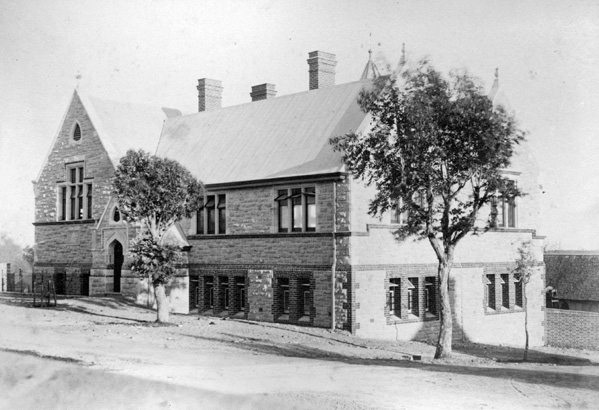
St Joseph's Primary School, c. 1895

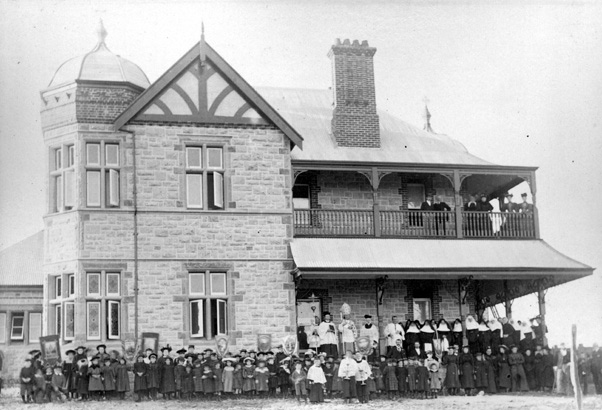
The opening of the Ladies' College in 1896

== Notable former students ==
- Lisa Baker (born 1958) – politician
- Alma Beard (1913–1942), one of the 22 nurses killed in the Bangka Island massacre
- Wendy Fatin (born 1941) – politician
- Gracie Gilbert (born 1992) – actress
- Liza Harvey (born 1966) – politician
- Frances O'Connor (born 1967) – actress
- Michelle Roberts (born 1960) – politician
- Indiana Massara (born 2002) – actress
- Aleksandra Biskup (born 2001) - Scientist

== See also ==
- List of schools in the Perth metropolitan area
- Catholic education in Australia
