= Love Child (TV series) =

Australian TV drama series (2014–2017)

- Genre: Drama
- Created by: Sarah Lambert
- Directed by: Geoff Bennett; Ian Barry; Shawn Seet; Shirley Barrett
- Starring: Jessica Marais; Jonathan LaPaglia; Matthew Le Nevez; Mandy McElhinney; Ryan Corr; Ella Scott Lynch; Harriet Dyer; Sophie Hensser; Gracie Gilbert; Miranda Tapsell
- Opening theme: "Love Child" by Diana Ross & the Supremes
- Country of origin: Australia
- Original language: English
- No. of series: 4
- No. of episodes: 36 (list of episodes)

Production
- Executive producers: Jo Rooney; Andy Ryan; David Taylor; David Maher
- Producers: Sue Seeary; Sarah Lambert; Tim Pye
- Production location: Sydney
- Running time: 48 minutes
- Production company: Playmaker Media

Original release
- Network: Nine Network
- Release: 17 February 2014 – 4 July 2017

Love Child is an Australian drama television series that follows the lives of staff and residents of the fictional Kings Cross Hospital and Stanton House in Sydney, starting in 1969 and continuing into the 1970s.

The program was created by Sarah Lambert and was first broadcast on the Nine Network on 17 February 2014. The program is based on the real-life forced adoption in Australia for which former Prime Minister Julia Gillard offered a national apology to those affected in 2013. Love Child was renewed for a second series on 2 March 2014. The series was renewed for a third series on 23 February 2015. The series was renewed for a fourth series on 8 November 2016 at Nine's upfronts.

In December 2017, Love Child was cancelled after four series.

== Background ==
On 8 April 2013, the Nine Network announced a new drama project from Playmaker Media named Love Child, an eight-part drama series by the creators of House Husbands. Joint heads of drama at Nine, Andy Ryan and Jo Rooney, stated "Love Child is a compelling and uplifting series that will appeal to every generation. The stories of young women and men fighting an unjust system are as relevant today as they were in the colourful and liberating world of Kings Cross in 1969." Love Child was created by Sarah Lambert. It is directed by Geoff Bennett, Grant Brown, Shawn Seet and Shirley Barrett, with Tim Pye, Sue Seeary and Sarah Lambert serving as producers. The series is also written by Lambert, Pye, Kym Goldsworthy, Cathryn Strickland, Giula Sandler, Matt Ford, Liz Doran and Vanessa Alexander.

== Casting ==
Jessica Marais, Jonathan LaPaglia and Mandy McElhinney were announced as the main cast members in April 2013. Marais stars as Dr Joan Millar, a smart and sophisticated trainee obstetrician who returns home from London to take a job at the Kings Cross Hospital. LaPaglia stars as Dr Patrick McNaughton, the charismatic head of obstetrics at Kings Cross Hospital. McElhinney stars as Frances Bolton, the tough matron who runs Stanton House, a home for unwed pregnant young women. The remainder of the cast was announced on 11 February 2014, with Ryan Corr as Johnny Lowry, a 60s flower child; Ella Scott Lynch as Shirley Ryan, a Russian socialite; Sophie Hensser as Viv Maguire, a country girl; Harriet Dyer as Patricia Saunders, a ditzy blonde; Gracie Gilbert as Annie Carmichael, a strong-willed mother determined to get back her baby; and Miranda Tapsell in her Logie award-winning debut role as Martha Tennant, an Aboriginal girl who was also adopted.

Corr did not return as a main cast member in season two but made a guest appearance. Matthew Le Nevez, Lincoln Younes and Marshall Napier joined the cast for season two as Jim, Chris Vesty, and Gregory respectively. Leah Purcell played a key character in the second half of season two. Jonathan Lapaglia did not return for the fourth season. Dan Hamill joined the cast along with Matt Day, Danielle Catanzariti, Darcie Irwin-Simpson, Sophia Forrest and Ronan Keating.

== Cast ==
=== Main ===
- Jessica Marais as Dr. Joan Millar
- Jonathan LaPaglia as Dr. Patrick McNaughton (seasons 1–3)
- Mandy McElhinney as Matron Frances Bolton
- Ella Scott Lynch as Shirley Ryan (seasons 1–3)
- Harriet Dyer as Patty Saunders (seasons 1–4)
- Sophie Hensser as Viv Maguire (seasons 1–4)
- Gracie Gilbert as Annie Carmichael (seasons 1–3)
- Miranda Tapsell as Martha Tennant
- Ryan Johnson as Phillip Paige (Note: Ryan Johnson was credited as main cast for the 5 episodes he appeared in during season 1)
- Ryan Corr as Johnny Lowry (season 1, guest: season 2)
- Matthew Le Nevez as Jim Marsh (seasons 2–3, guest: season 4)
- Tiarnie Coupland as Maggie (season 3)
- Olivia O'Flynn as Liz (season 3)
- Jeremy Lindsay Taylor as Leon (season 3)
- Dan Hamill as Dr. Andrew Patterson (season 4)
- Danielle Catanzariti as Elena (season 4)
- Darcie Irwin-Simpson as Rita (season 4)
- Sophia Forrest as Debbie (season 4)
- Ronan Keating as Dr Lawrence Faber (season 4)

=== Recurring ===
- Maya Stange as Eva McNaughton (seasons 1–3)
- Ben Lawson as Colin Ryan (season 1)
- Ben O'Toole as Pete (seasons 1–3)
- Lincoln Younes as Chris Vesty (seasons 2–3)
- Jessica June as Tania (season 2)
- Andrew Ryan as Simon Bowditch (seasons 2–4)
- Marshall Napier as Greg Matheson (season 2)
- Ian Bolt as Bob Flannery (seasons 1–2)

=== Guests ===
- Aileen Beale as Mark Foy's saleswoman (season 1)
- Anna Lawrence as Maggie Flanagan (season 3)
- Ben Turland as Ronnie (season 1, 1 episode)
- Charlotte Hazzard as Helen (season 3)
- Helen Thomson as Eleanor (1 episode)
- Jessica Donoghue as Faye (seasons 2–3)
- Lucy Bell as Belinda Saunders (1 episode)
- Lucy Wigmore as Carol (season 1)
- Susan Prior as Geraldine Donnelly
- Tiriel Mora as Henry Bowditch (season 3, 2 episodes)

== Episodes ==
Series	Episodes	Originally released	
Series	Episodes	First released	Last released
1	8	17 February 2014	7 April 2014
2	8	5 May 2015	23 June 2015
3	10	20 June 2016	1 August 2016
4	10	2 May 2017	4 July 2017

== Ratings ==
Season	Episodes	Season premiere	Season finale	Peak audience (millions)	Average audience (millions)
1	8	17 February 2014	7 April 2014	1.59	1.47
2	8	5 May 2015	23 June 2015	1.15	1.07
3	10	20 June 2016	1 August 2016	1.01	0.92

== Awards and nominations ==
Year	Award	Category	Nominee	Result
2015	Logie Awards	Most Popular Drama Program	Love Child	Nominated
2015	Logie Awards	Most Popular Actress	Jessica Marais	Nominated
2015	Logie Awards	Most Popular Actress	Mandy McElhinney	Nominated
2015	Logie Awards	Most Popular New Talent	Harriet Dyer	Nominated
2015	Logie Awards	Most Popular New Talent	Miranda Tapsell	Won
2015	Logie Awards	Most Outstanding Newcomer	Harriet Dyer	Nominated
2015	Logie Awards	Most Outstanding Newcomer	Miranda Tapsell	Won
2015	Golden Nymph Awards	Best Drama Series	Love Child	Nominated
2015	Golden Nymph Awards	Best Actor in a Drama Series	Jonathan LaPaglia	Nominated
2016	Logie Awards	Best Drama Program	Love Child	Nominated
2016	Logie Awards	Most Outstanding Drama Series	Love Child	Nominated
2016	Logie Awards	Best Actress	Jessica Marais	Won
2016	Logie Awards	Supporting Actress	Harriet Dyer	Nominated
