= Gracie Gilbert =

Australian actress (born 1992)

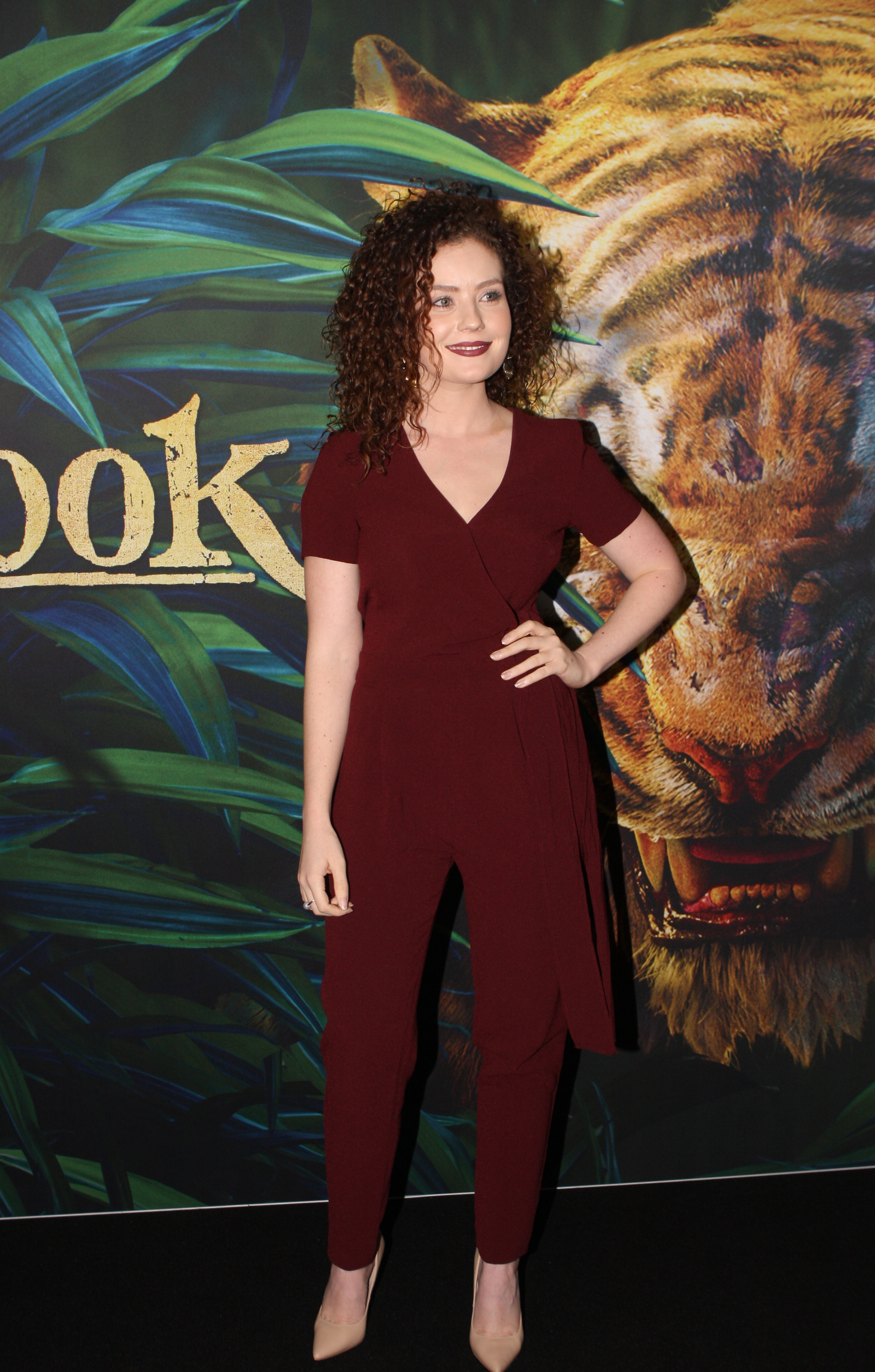
- Born: Perth, Western Australia, Australia
- Education: Mercedes College, Perth; University of Western Australia
- Occupation: Actor
- Years active: 2002–2016

Gracie Gilbert is an Australian former actress, best known for her role as Tammy Lane in the Fox8 teen drama series SLiDE, as Vicki in Lockie Leonard, as gangster Squizzy Taylor's mistress Ida Pender in Underbelly: Squizzy, and as Annie in Love Child.

Since 2018 she has worked in the field of law in Western Australia.

== Early life and education ==
Gracie Gilbert grew up in Perth, Western Australia. She attended Mercedes College and the University of Western Australia, where she began a combined Bachelor of Arts and Bachelor of Laws degree, majoring in English and Women's Studies.

She trained in acting at the 16th Street Actors Studio in Melbourne, Ali Robert Screen Studio in Perth, and with Tom McSweeney. In 2016 she studied producing at the Australian Film, Television and Radio School.

She completed her Bachelor of Laws degree at the University of Notre Dame Australia in 2019.

== Career ==
Aged 13, Gilbert's first role was as Vicki in Lockie Leonard.

After completing school and beginning university studies, she played Tammy Lane in the Fox8 teen drama series SLiDE, filmed in Brisbane.

She played gangster Squizzy Taylor's mistress Ida Pender in Underbelly: Squizzy, and as Annie in Love Child (2014).

In 2014 she played Viola in a stage production of Shakespeare's Twelfth Night by Shakespeare WA.

Since 2018 Gilbert has worked in the field of law in Western Australia.

== Filmography ==
=== Television ===
Year	Title	Role	Production type
2006	Streetsmartz	Jennifer	Television series
2007–2010	Lockie Leonard	Vicki	Television series
2011	SLiDE	Tammy Lane	Television series
2013	Underbelly: Squizzy	Ida Pender	Television series
2014–2017	Love Child	Annie Carmichael	Television series
2015	Gallipoli	Tessa Gordon	Television mini-series
2015	Best Friends Whenever	Production assistant: A Time to Travel	Television series

=== Theatre ===
Year	Title	Role	Production type
2014	Twelfth Night	Viola	Shakespeare WA
